= 2021 U.S. National Gymnastics Championships =

- Venue: Dickies Arena
- Location: Fort Worth, Texas, U.S.
- Date: June 3, 2021—June 6, 2021

The 2021 U.S. National Gymnastics Championships was the 57th edition of the U.S. National Gymnastics Championships. The competitionwas held at Dickies Arena in Fort Worth, Texas from June 3 to June 6, 2021.

== Competition schedule and media ==
The competition featured Senior and Junior contests for women's and men's disciplines. This was the preliminary competition schedule:

- Thursday, June 3: Men's gymnastics – 1:00 p.m., juniors, and 6:30 p.m., seniors
- Friday, June 4: Women's gymnastics – 1:00 p.m., juniors, and 6:30 p.m., seniors
- Saturday, June 5: Men's gymnastics – 1:00 p.m., juniors, and 6:30 p.m., seniors
- Sunday, June 6: Women's gymnastics – 12:00 p.m., juniors, and 5:30 p.m., seniors

The event was broadcast on NBC Sports.

== Medalists ==
The results for Junior men's was partitioned in two age categories: 15-16 and 17-18. Simone Biles was the AA Champion of the Year for a third year in a row, while Brody Malone won his first award over incumbent and previous title holders Sam Mikulak and Yul Moldauer.

Event	Gold	Silver	Bronze
Senior Women
Individual all-around	Simone Biles	Sunisa Lee	Jordan Chiles
Vault	Simone Biles	MyKayla Skinner	Jordan Chiles
Uneven bars	Sunisa Lee	Riley McCusker	Simone Biles
Balance beam	Simone Biles	Sunisa Lee	Grace McCallum
Floor	Simone Biles	Kayla DiCello	Leanne Wong
Junior Women
Individual all-around	Katelyn Jong	Madray Johnson	Kaliya Lincoln
Vault	Kailin Chio	Joscelyn Roberson	Katelyn Jong
Uneven bars	Katelyn Jong	Madray Johnson	Charlotte Booth
Balance beam	Joscelyn Roberson	Ella Kate Parker	Madray Johnson
Floor	Kaliya Lincoln	Katelyn Jong	Kailin Chio
Senior Men
Individual all-around	Brody Malone	Yul Moldauer	Sam Mikulak
Floor	Eddie Penev	Gage Dyer	Yul Moldauer
Pommel horse	Stephen Nedoroscik	Alec Yoder	Allan Bower
Rings	Alex Diab	Brody Malone	Yul Moldauer
Vault	Brody Malone	Eddie Penev	Gage Dyer
Parallel bars	Yul Moldauer	Shane Wiskus	Colt Walker
Horizontal bar	Sam Mikulak	Brody Malone	Genki Suzuki
Junior Men (17-18)
Individual all-around	Fred Richard	Toby Liang	Joseph Pepe

== Results ==
=== Women ===
==== Senior ====
Rank	Gymnast	Vault (gymnastics)	Uneven bars	Balance beam	Floor (gymnastics)	Day Total	Total
1st place, gold medalist(s)	Simone Biles	15.800	14.750	14.350	14.650	59.550	119.650
1st place, gold medalist(s)	Simone Biles	15.550	14.700	14.900	14.950	60.100	119.650
2nd place, silver medalist(s)	Sunisa Lee	14.400	15.300	13.900	13.750	57.350	114.950
2nd place, silver medalist(s)	Sunisa Lee	14.300	14.900	14.700	13.700	57.600	114.950
3rd place, bronze medalist(s)	Jordan Chiles	14.950	14.450	13.950	13.550	56.900	114.450
3rd place, bronze medalist(s)	Jordan Chiles	14.900	14.600	14.050	14.00	57.550	114.450
4	Emma Malabuyo	14.050	13.950	12.950	13.500	54.450	110.450
4	Emma Malabuyo	14.100	13.850	14.600	13.450	56.000	110.450
5	Leanne Wong	14.750	12.700	13.650	14.200	55.300	110.150
5	Leanne Wong	14.550	14.000	12.700	13.600	54.850	110.150
6	Jade Carey	14.700	13.950	13.550	13.250	55.450	110.000
6	Jade Carey	14.550	13.600	12.750	13.650	54.550	110.000
7	Grace McCallum	14.600	13.050	14.200	12.450	54.300	109.550
7	Grace McCallum	14.500	13.150	14.200	13.400	55.250	109.550
7	Skye Blakely	14.700	12.950	12.750	13.450	53.850	109.550
7	Skye Blakely	14.550	13.600	14.250	13.300	55.700	109.550
9	MyKayla Skinner	14.900	13.750	12.550	13.000	54.200	109.500
9	MyKayla Skinner	15.000	13.500	13.050	13.750	55.300	109.500
10	Kara Eaker	13.950	13.900	13.700	13.000	54.550	109.050
10	Kara Eaker	13.900	12.700	14.200	13.700	54.500	109.050
11	Kayla DiCello	14.650	12.900	12.650	14.050	54.250	108.800
11	Kayla DiCello	14.400	13.550	12.550	14.050	54.550	108.800
12	Shilese Jones	14.850	14.300	12.450	12.500	54.100	108.500
12	Shilese Jones	15.000	14.400	11.750	13.250	54.400	108.500
13	Emily Lee	14.250	12.150	13.850	13.450	53.700	108.250
13	Emily Lee	14.500	13.050	13.650	13.350	54.550	108.250
14	Amari Drayton	14.350	13.400	12.900	13.050	53.700	107.100
14	Amari Drayton	14.500	13.350	12.800	12.750	53.400	107.100
15	Ava Siegfeldt	14.050	13.600	12.800	12.850	53.300	106.800
15	Ava Siegfeldt	14.150	13.450	13.150	12.750	53.500	106.800
16	Addison Fatta	14.450	13.650	12.050	12.900	53.050	106.650
16	Addison Fatta	14.300	13.500	12.800	13.000	53.600	106.650
17	Zoe Miller	14.100	14.300	11.750	12.800	52.950	106.400
17	Zoe Miller	14.200	13.900	13.050	12.300	53.450	106.400
18	Sydney Barros	14.300	13.550	13.000	12.450	53.300	105.850
18	Sydney Barros	14.350	13.300	12.100	12.800	52.550	105.850
19	Karis German	13.750	13.600	11.450	13.600	52.400	105.450
19	Karis German	13.750	13.450	12.350	13.500	53.050	105.450
20	eMjae Frazier	14.400	12.550	13.000	13.350	53.300	105.350
20	eMjae Frazier	14.250	11.900	12.700	13.200	52.050	105.350
21	Kaylen Morgan	13.900	13.100	11.900	12.700	51.600	105.050
21	Kaylen Morgan	13.900	13.050	13.500	13.000	53.450	105.050
22	Ciena Alipio	13.400	12.100	13.700	12.300	51.500	103.950
22	Ciena Alipio	13.500	13.350	12.950	12.650	52.450	103.950
23	Aleah Finnegan	13.050	11.700	11.700	13.500	49.950	103.450
23	Aleah Finnegan	14.000	13.350	13.550	12.600	53.450	103.450
–	Katelyn Rosen	13.900	–	12.600	12.700	39.200	78.050
–	Katelyn Rosen	14.000	–	12.000	12.850	38.850	78.050
–	Chellsie Memmel	14.750	11.650	13.700	–	40.100	69.300
–	Chellsie Memmel	13.100	3.950	12.150	–	29.200	69.300
–	Morgan Hurd	–	–	10.300	12.600	22.900	47.100
–	Morgan Hurd	–	–	11.600	12.600	24.200	47.100
–	Riley McCusker	–	14.650	–	–	14.650	29.750
–	Riley McCusker	–	15.100	–	–	15.100	29.750
–	Lyden Saltness	–	12.100	–	–	12.100	22.900
–	Lyden Saltness	–	10.800	–	–	10.800	22.900

==== Junior ====
Rank	Gymnast	Vault (gymnastics)	Uneven bars	Balance beam	Floor (gymnastics)	Day Total	Total
1st place, gold medalist(s)	Katelyn Jong	14.250	13.200	13.150	13.500	54.100	107.400
1st place, gold medalist(s)	Katelyn Jong	14.300	13.300	12.050	13.650	53.300	107.400
2nd place, silver medalist(s)	Madray Johnson	13.650	12.800	13.050	13.050	52.550	105.150
2nd place, silver medalist(s)	Madray Johnson	13.800	13.000	13.200	12.600	52.600	105.150
3rd place, bronze medalist(s)	Kaliya Lincoln	14.150	12.200	12.550	13.750	52.650	104.650
3rd place, bronze medalist(s)	Kaliya Lincoln	14.150	12.150	12.100	13.600	52.000	104.650
4	Joscelyn Roberson	14.350	10.600	13.250	13.100	51.300	104.400
4	Joscelyn Roberson	14.300	12.150	13.550	13.100	53.100	104.400
5	Kailin Chio	14.300	12.200	13.300	13.200	53.000	104.100
5	Kailin Chio	14.500	10.950	12.500	13.150	51.100	104.100
6	Charlotte Booth	14.200	12.850	12.050	12.350	51.450	102.600
6	Charlotte Booth	13.700	12.800	13.000	11.650	51.150	102.600
7	Ella Kate Parker	13.200	12.100	13.300	12.300	50.900	102.200
7	Ella Kate Parker	13.450	12.250	13.400	12.200	51.300	102.200
7	Gabriella Van Frayen	13.600	12.800	12.950	12.400	51.550	102.200
7	Gabriella Van Frayen	13.550	12.350	12.450	12.100	50.450	102.200
7	Avery King	13.750	12.100	12.800	12.800	51.450	102.200
7	Avery King	13.500	11.600	12.900	12.750	50.750	102.200
10	Azaraya Ra-Akbar	13.450	12.400	11.650	12.650	50.150	101.150
10	Azaraya Ra-Akbar	13.150	12.250	12.450	13.150	51.000	101.150
11	Izzy Stassi	13.250	12.850	11.300	12.550	49.950	101.000
11	Izzy Stassi	13.350	12.650	12.350	12.700	51.050	101.000
12	Ella Murphy	12.850	10.200	13.500	12.250	48.800	100.150
12	Ella Murphy	13.650	12.400	12.450	12.850	51.350	100.150
13	Nola Matthews	13.600	13.050	11.800	11.850	50.300	99.350
13	Nola Matthews	13.400	11.900	13.200	10.550	49.050	99.350

=== Men ===
==== Senior ====
Rank	Gymnast	Floor (gymnastics)	Pommel horse	Rings (gymnastics)	Vault (gymnastics)	Parallel bars	Horizontal bar	Day Total	Total
1st place, gold medalist(s)	Brody Malone	13.950	14.150	14.600	14.700	14.400	14.450	86.250	170.700
1st place, gold medalist(s)	Brody Malone	13.900	13.950	14.550	14.300	12.700	15.050	84.450	170.700
2nd place, silver medalist(s)	Yul Moldauer	14.500	13.050	14.500	14.200	14.350	13.000	83.600	167.950
2nd place, silver medalist(s)	Yul Moldauer	14.300	13.050	14.500	14.200	14.350	13.000	83.600	167.950
3rd place, bronze medalist(s)	Sam Mikulak	13.350	13.000	13.600	14.200	13.550	14.750	82.450	167.400
3rd place, bronze medalist(s)	Sam Mikulak	14.600	12.600	14.200	14.350	14.350	14.850	84.950	167.400
4	Brandon Briones	14.200	13.350	14.100	14.400	13.700	13.850	83.600	167.150
4	Brandon Briones	14.350	13.300	14.200	14.400	13.800	13.500	83.550	167.150
5	Allan Bower	14.050	14.250	13.600	14.350	13.100	13.250	82.600	166.150
5	Allan Bower	14.400	14.300	13.700	14.500	13.700	12.950	83.550	166.150
6	Akash Modi	13.900	13.450	14.050	14.250	13.800	13.500	82.950	165.500
6	Akash Modi	13.350	13.400	13.950	14.450	13.700	13.700	82.550	165.500
7	Robert Neff	13.650	12.500	13.350	14.200	13.900	13.150	80.750	162.350
7	Robert Neff	13.500	13.550	13.900	14.000	13.300	13.350	81.600	162.350
8	Ian Gunther	12.350	13.000	13.600	13.750	14.150	13.650	80.500	162.200
8	Ian Gunther	13.200	13.600	13.600	13.600	14.250	13.450	81.700	162.200
9	Shane Wiskus	14.000	13.450	14.000	13.500	14.550	13.850	83.350	162.150
9	Shane Wiskus	14.750	13.250	14.100	13.600	14.300	8.800	78.800	162.150
10	Matt Wenske	13.950	12.200	13.350	14.350	13.850	13.250	80.950	161.150
10	Matt Wenske	13.450	11.750	13.550	14.450	13.800	13.200	80.200	161.150
11	Genki Suzuki	12.650	13.700	13.450	13.500	12.250	13.650	79.200	160.700
11	Genki Suzuki	13.450	13.350	13.600	13.300	14.000	13.800	81.500	160.700
12	Colt Walker	12.050	12.950	13.700	14.150	14.550	13.350	80.750	160.300
12	Colt Walker	13.250	11.800	13.700	14.100	14.250	12.450	79.550	160.300
13	Adrian De Los Angeles	14.200	12.250	12.900	13.550	14.100	13.200	80.200	160.200
13	Adrian De Los Angeles	13.750	12.200	13.050	13.150	14.250	13.600	80.000	160.200
14	Evan Davis	13.600	13.700	13.500	13.850	13.150	12.650	80.450	160.200
14	Evan Davis	13.600	12.150	13.600	14.200	13.250	12.950	79.750	160.200
15	Taylor Burkhart	13.900	12.600	13.250	13.850	12.900	13.000	79.500	159.400
15	Taylor Burkhart	13.650	12.300	13.550	13.550	13.400	13.450	79.900	159.400
16	Kiwan Watts	13.850	11.750	12.700	14.450	13.500	11.950	77.600	159.200
16	Kiwan Watts	13.850	12.450	12.950	14.350	13.800	13.600	81.000	159.200
17	Ian Lasic-Ellis	13.250	12.050	12.150	13.600	13.150	13.300	77.500	157.200
17	Ian Lasic-Ellis	13.650	12.900	13.150	13.700	13.150	13.150	79.700	157.200
14	Donothan Bailey	13.800	12.900	13.150	14.250	10.950	13.800	78.850	156.550
14	Donothan Bailey	11.400	13.650	13.050	14.150	12.200	13.250	77.700	156.550
19	Timothy Wang	13.150	13.500	14.300	14.400	11.900	13.200	80.450	154.550
19	Timothy Wang	10.850	13.650	13.350	13.300	12.250	12.400	75.800	154.550
20	Jeremy Bischoff	13.400	12.900	12.900	13.550	13.050	11.550	77.350	156.150
20	Jeremy Bischoff	13.900	12.650	13.000	13.600	12.700	12.950	78.800	156.150
21	Nicolas Kuebler	13.500	12.650	13.050	13.500	13.100	12.150	77.950	155.100
21	Nicolas Kuebler	13.350	12.400	13.100	13.600	13.100	11.600	77.150	155.100
22	Khoi Young	13.000	13.850	12.900	14.200	11.200	11.300	76.450	154.450
22	Khoi Young	13.000	13.100	13.100	14.400	12.550	11.850	78.000	154.450
23	Ryan McVay	13.000	12.750	12.750	12.700	11.150	12.650	75.000	152.200
23	Ryan McVay	13.100	12.550	13.300	13.150	12.650	12.450	77.200	152.200
24	Mike Fletcher	12.450	12.400	12.950	12.950	11.950	10.600	73.300	148.750
24	Mike Fletcher	12.650	12.500	12.950	12.700	12.400	12.250	75.450	148.750
25	Michael Moran	11.400	11.650	12.150	13.800	11.150	11.350	71.500	145.650
25	Michael Moran	12.100	12.350	12.750	13.900	10.750	12.300	74.150	145.650
–	Trevor Howard	11.850	11.850	14.450	13.650	13.300	12.950	78.050	106.350
–	Trevor Howard	–	–	14.250	14.050	–	–	28.300	106.350
–	Alec Yoder	–	15.000	13.550	–	13.600	11.950	54.100	96.050
–	Alec Yoder	–	15.050	12.900	–	14.000	–	41.950	96.050
–	Gage Dyer	14.550	11.400	–	14.700	–	–	40.650	69.700
–	Gage Dyer	14.800	–	–	14.250		–	29.050	69.700
–	Eddie Penev	14.750	–	–	14.450	–	–	29.200	58.700
–	Eddie Penev	15.000	–	–	14.500	–	–	29.500	58.700
–	Alex Diab	12.900	–	14.950	13.950	–	–	41.800	56.450
–	Alex Diab	–	–	14.650	–	–	–	14.650	56.450
–	Stephen Nedoroscik	–	15.100	–	–	–	–	15.100	30.200
–	Stephen Nedoroscik	–	15.100	–	–	–	–	15.100	30.200
–	Brandon Wynn	–	–	13.500	–	–	–	13.500	27.800
–	Brandon Wynn	–	–	14.300	–	–	–	14.300	27.800
–	Michael Paradise	–	13.150	–	–	–	–	13.150	26.400
–	Michael Paradise	–	13.250	–	–	–	–	14.650	26.400

== Women's National Team ==
The top six women automatically qualified to the national team: Simone Biles, Sunisa Lee, Jordan Chiles, Emma Malabuyo, Leanne Wong, and Jade Carey. The selection committee also added the women who finished 7th–17th to the national team: Grace McCallum, Skye Blakely, MyKayla Skinner, Kara Eaker, Kayla DiCello, Shilese Jones, Emily Lee, Amari Drayton, Ava Siegfeldt, Addison Fatta, and Zoe Miller. Riley McCusker, who only competed on the uneven bars and finished second, was also added. All 18 national team members qualified to compete at the upcoming Olympic Trials.

The top six junior competitors who automatically qualified to the national team were Katelyn Jong, Madray Johnson, Kaliya Lincoln, Joscelyn Roberson, Kailin Chio, and Charlotte Booth. Additionally, co-7th place finishers Ella Kate Parker, Gabriella Van Frayen, and Avery King were also added to the national team. Jong, Johnson, Lincoln, and Chio were selected to compete at the upcoming Junior Pan American Championships with Roberson as the alternate.

== Men's National Team ==
The five men who competed at the Pan American Championships (held the same weekend as the National Championships) were automatically added to the senior National Team: Cameron Bock, Vitaliy Guimaraes, Paul Juda, Riley Loos, and Donnell Whittenburg.

At the conclusion of the competition 12 athletes were automatically named to the senior National Team: Allan Bower, Brandon Briones, Alex Diab, Gage Dyer, Ian Gunther, Brody Malone, Sam Mikulak, Akash Modi, Yul Moldauer, Stephen Nedoroscik, Eddie Penev, and Shane Wiskus. The Men's Program Committee named an additional three athletes to the team after accepting petitions submitted by the athletes: Robert Neff, Matt Wenske, and Alec Yoder. Also selected was the inaugural Senior Development Team: Taylor Burkhart, Dallas Hale, Joseph Pepe, Colt Walker, and Khoi Young.

The top-three 15, 16, and 17-year-old athletes automatically qualified to the Junior Men’s National Team: Xander Hong, Toby Liang, Caleb Melton, Alexandru Nitache, Cole Partridge, Vahe Petrosyan, Fred Richard, Kai Uemura, and Ignacio Yockers. The Men's Program Committee named an additional five athletes to the junior men's national team: Landen Blixt, Caden Clinton, Asher Hong, Toma Murakawa, and David Shamah.

== Participants ==
The following individuals participated in the women's competition:

=== Seniors ===
- Ciena Alipio – San Jose, California (Midwest Gymnastics)
- Sydney Barros – Lewisville, Texas (World Champions Centre)
- Simone Biles – Spring, Texas (World Champions Centre)
- Skye Blakely – Frisco, Texas (WOGA)
- Jade Carey – Phoenix, Arizona (Arizona Sunrays)
- Jordan Chiles – Spring, Texas (World Champions Centre)
- Kayla DiCello – Boyds, Maryland (Hill's Gymnastics)
- Amari Drayton – Spring, Texas (World Champions Centre)
- Kara Eaker – Grain Valley, Missouri (GAGE)
- Addison Fatta – Wrightsville, Pennsylvania (Prestige)
- Aleah Finnegan – Lee's Summit, Missouri (GAGE)
- eMjae Frazier – Erial, New Jersey (Parkettes)
- Laurie Hernandez – Old Bridge, New Jersey (Gym-Max)
- Morgan Hurd – Middletown, Delaware (First State)
- Karis German – Spring, Texas (World Champions Center)
- Shilese Jones – Westerville, Ohio (Future Gymnastics Academy)
- Emily Lee – Los Gatos, California (West Valley Gymnastics School)
- Sunisa Lee – St. Paul, Minnesota (Midwest Gymnastics Center)
- Emma Malabuyo – Flower Mound, Texas (Texas Dreams)
- Grace McCallum – Isanti, Minnesota (Twin City Twisters)
- ~~Konnor McClain – Cross Lanes, West Virginia (WOGA)~~
- Riley McCusker – Brielle, New Jersey (Arizona Sunrays)
- Chellsie Memmel – Dousman, Wisconsin (M and M Gymnastics)
- Zoe Miller – Spring, Texas (World Champions Centre)
- Kaylen Morgan – Huntersville, North Carolina (Everest)
- Katelyn Rosen – Boerne, Texas (Mavericks at Artemovs)
- Ava Siegfeldt – Hampton, Virginia (World Class Gymnastics)
- Lyden Saltness – Forest Lake, Minnesota (Midwest Gymnastics)
- MyKayla Skinner – Gilbert, Arizona (Desert Lights Gymnastics)
- ~~Faith Torrez – Pleasant Prairie, Wisconsin (Legacy Elite)~~
- Leanne Wong – Overland Park, Kansas (GAGE)

=== Juniors ===
- Charlotte Booth – Clermont, Florida (Brandy Johnson's)
- Kailin Chio – Henderson, Nevada (Gymcats)
- Madray Johnson – Dallas, Texas (WOGA)
- Katelyn Jong – Allen, Texas (Metroplex Gymnastics)
- ~~Levi Jung-Ruivivar – Woodland Hills, California (Paramount Elite)~~
- Avery King – Dallas, Texas (WOGA)
- Kaliya Lincoln – Frisco, Texas (WOGA)
- Nola Matthews – Gilroy, California (Airborne Gymnastics)
- Ella Murphy – Frisco, Texas (WOGA)
- Ella Kate Parker – West Chester, Ohio (Cincinnati Gymnastics)
- Azaraya Ra-Akbar – Columbia, Maryland (World Class)
- Joscelyn Roberson – Texarkana, Texas (North East Texas Elite)
- Izzy Stassi – North Royalton, Ohio (Gym X-Treme)
- Gabriella Van Frayen – Lewis Center, Ohio (Gym X-Treme)
