= Kaliya Lincoln =

American artistic gymnast (born 2006)

- Born: April 23, 2006 (age 20) Hayward, California, US

Gymnastics career
- Discipline: Women's artistic gymnastics
- Country represented: United States; (2020–2025)
- College team: LSU Tigers (2025–2028)
- Club: World Olympic Gymnastics Academy
Medal record
Representing the United States
Pan American Games
| Gold medal – first place | 2023 Santiago | Team |
| Gold medal – first place | 2023 Santiago | Floor exercise |
Representing Louisiana State Tigers
NCAA Championships
| Silver medal – second place | 2026 Fort Worth | Team |
| Silver medal – second place | 2026 Fort Worth | Vault |

Kaliya Lincoln (born April 23, 2006) is an American artistic gymnast. She is the 2023 Pan American Games champion on floor exercise and in the team event, and 2021 Junior Pan American champion on vault and floor.

== Junior gymnastics career ==
Lincoln was selected to compete at the 2020 International Gymnix, alongside Skye Blakely, Katelyn Jong, and Konnor McClain. As a result, she was added to the junior national team for the first time. While there she helped USA win team gold.

Lincoln competed at the 2021 Winter Cup where she placed fourteenth in the all-around. In May she competed at the 2021 U.S. Classic where she placed first on floor exercise and third on vault. In June, she competed at her first National Championships. She ended the two-day competition first on floor exercise, and third in all-around with a combined score of 104.650. She was then selected to represent the United States at the 2021 Junior Pan American Championships alongside Kailin Chio, Madray Johnson and Katelyn Jong. While there she helped the United States place first as a team and individually she won gold on vault and floor exercise.

== Senior gymnastics career ==
=== 2023 ===
Lincoln made her senior debut at the 2023 Winter Cup, where she won gold on floor exercise. In August she competed at the 2023 U.S. Classic where she tied with Joscelyn Roberson for silver on floor exercise. She then competed at the 2023 National Championships where she won silver on floor exercise behind Simone Biles.

In September Lincoln was named to the team to compete at the 2023 Pan American Games alongside Jordan Chiles, Kayla DiCello, Zoe Miller, and Tiana Sumanasekera. At the Pan American Games she won a gold medal on floor exercise and helped USA win gold in the team event; she also qualified to the balance beam final where she placed sixth.

In November Lincoln signed her National Letter of Intent with the LSU Tigers.

=== 2024 ===
Lincoln won silver medals on floor exercise at both the Winter Cup and the Core Hydration Classic.

Lincoln competed at the 2024 U.S. National Gymnastics Championships, however she withdrew from the competition after the first two rotations on May 31, 2024. She scored a 12.700 on uneven bars and 12.300 on balance beam.

After missing the USA Gymnastics National Championships, Lincoln petitioned for her spot to compete at the 2024 United States Olympic trials, and was approved. She placed 5th on floor exercise and 9th in the all-around. Lincoln was named a non-traveling alternate for the 2024 Olympic team.

== Collegiate gymnastics career ==
Lincoln made her debut for the LSU Tigers on January 3, 2025 in a meet against Iowa State. At the 2026 NCAA Championships, she finished second on vault behind Keira Wells and tied with teammate Kailin Chio.

=== Career perfect 10.0 ===
Kalyia Lincoln's Perfect 10 Scores
| Season | Date | Event | Meet |
|---|---|---|---|
| 2026 | April 4, 2026 | Floor exercise | NCAA Regional Final |

=== Regular season ranking ===
| Season | All-around | Vault | Uneven bars | Balance beam | Floor exercise |
|---|---|---|---|---|---|
| 2025 | N/A | 86th | N/A | N/A | N/A |
| 2026 | N/A | 11th | N/A | 29th | 2nd |

== Competitive history ==
| Year | Event | Team | AA | VT | UB | BB | FX |
Junior
| 2020 | International Gymnix | 1st place, gold medalist(s) | | | | | |
| 2021 | Winter Cup | | 14 | 5 | | | 6 |
| 2021 | American Classic | | | | 8 | | 10 |
| 2021 | U.S. Classic | | | 3rd place, bronze medalist(s) | | | 1st place, gold medalist(s) |
| 2021 | U.S. National Championships | | 3rd place, bronze medalist(s) | 4 | 8 | | 1st place, gold medalist(s) |
| 2021 | Pan American Championships | 1st place, gold medalist(s) | | 1st place, gold medalist(s) | | | 1st place, gold medalist(s) |
Senior
| 2023 | Winter Cup | | 9 | | 10 | 22 | 1st place, gold medalist(s) |
| 2023 | U.S. Classic | | 27 | | 31 | 10 | 2nd place, silver medalist(s) |
| 2023 | U.S. National Championships | | | | 27 | 9 | 2nd place, silver medalist(s) |
| 2023 | Pan American Games | 1st place, gold medalist(s) | | | | 6 | 1st place, gold medalist(s) |
| 2024 | Winter Cup | | | | | 16 | 2nd place, silver medalist(s) |
| 2024 | U.S. Classic | | 10 | | 20 | 32 | 2nd place, silver medalist(s) |
| 2024 | Olympic Trials | | 9 | | 6 | 9 | 5 |
NCAA
| 2025 | SEC Championships | 1st place, gold medalist(s) | | | | | |
| 2025 | NCAA Championships | 5 | | | | | |
| 2026 | SEC Championships | 3rd place, bronze medalist(s) | | | | | |
| 2026 | NCAA Championships | 2nd place, silver medalist(s) | | 2nd place, silver medalist(s) | | 56 | 13 |
