= List of World Olympic Gymnastics Academy alumni =

This is a list of former gymnasts who have attended the World Olympic Gymnastics Academy or WOGA at either their Plano or Frisco locations. Since its opening in 1994, WOGA has grown to be one of the nation's most prestigious gymnastics clubs and upholds a credible history featuring Olympic champions, World champions and many National champions.

Gymnasts are listed by the years that they trained at the facility

== 2000s ==
=== 1999–2005 ===
- Marie Fjordholm (1999–00) — 1997, 1998, 1999 and 2000 U.S. National Championships qualifier, moved to competing internationally for the US Team after the 2000 season, represented the first place US team winning Team All Around at the 2001 Pontiac Championship, University of Georgia Gymdog Team Member (2002-2003)-.
- Lindsey vanden Eykel (1999–01) — Two-time National Championships qualifier, UCLA Bruins team member.
- Kaitlin White (2000–03) — Five-time U.S. Nationals qualifier, Alabama Crimson Tide team member.
