= Kayla DiCello =

American artistic gymnast (born 2004)

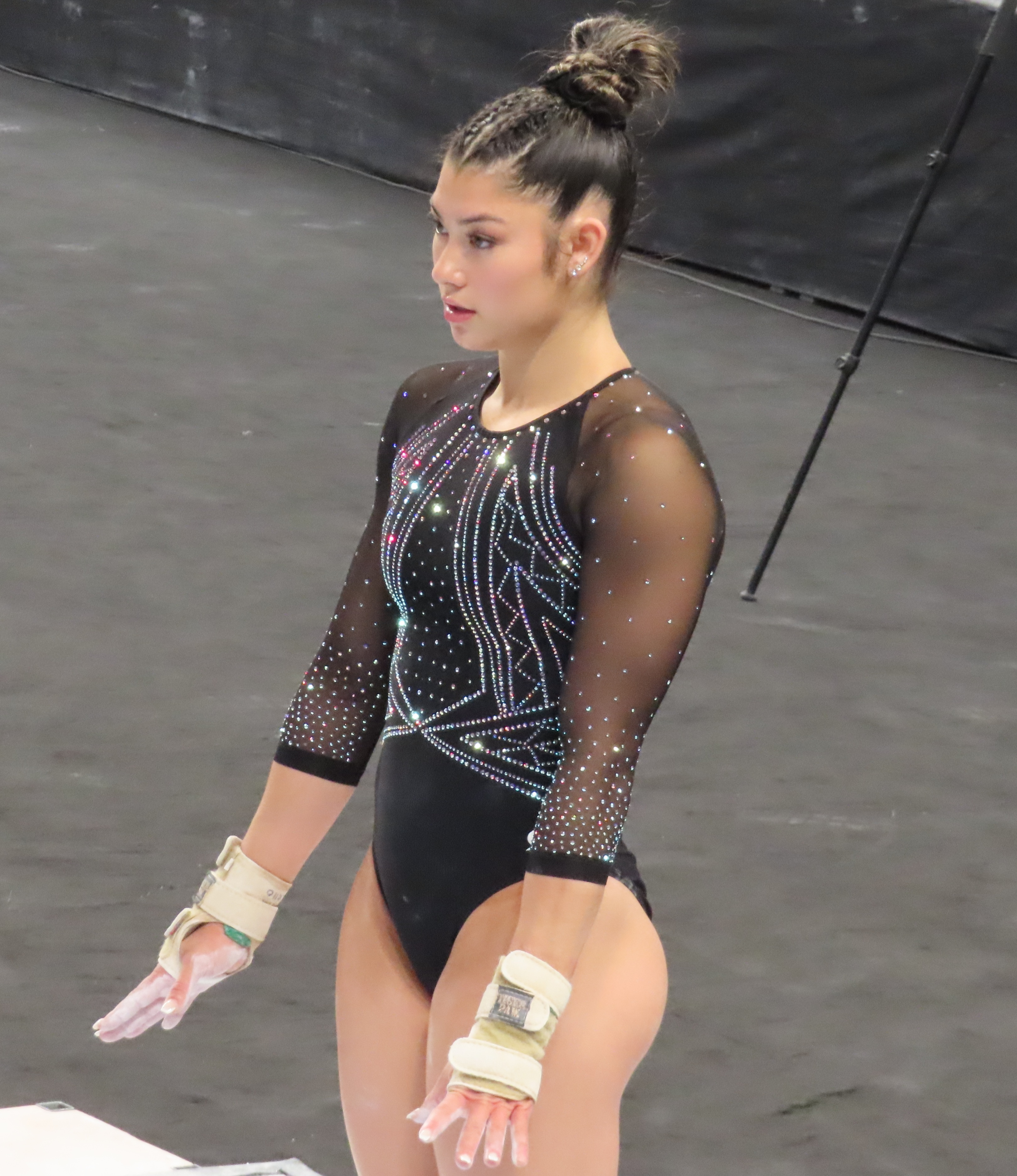
- DiCello at the 2024 U.S. Championships

Personal information
- Full name: Kayla Kecia DiCello
- Born: January 25, 2004 (age 22) Maryland, United States
- Height: 5 ft 4 in (163 cm)

Gymnastics career
- Discipline: Women's artistic gymnastics
- Country represented: United States; (2018–2025)
- College team: Florida Gators (2023, 2025–2027)
- Club: Hills Gymnastics
- Head coach: Kelli Hill
Medal record
Representing the United States
Women's artistic gymnastics
World Championships
Gold medal – first place	2023 Antwerp	Team
Bronze medal – third place	2021 Kitakyushu	All-Around
Pan American Games
Gold medal – first place	2023 Santiago	Team
Gold medal – first place	2023 Santiago	All-Around
Silver medal – second place	2023 Santiago	Floor exercise
Pan American Championships
Gold medal – first place	2022 Rio de Janeiro	Floor Exercise
Silver medal – second place	2022 Rio de Janeiro	Team
Junior World Championships
Gold medal – first place	2019 Győr	Vault
Bronze medal – third place	2019 Győr	Team
Bronze medal – third place	2019 Győr	Balance Beam
FIG World Cup
Event / 1st / 2nd / 3rd; All-Around World Cup / 0 / 1 / 0
Representing Florida Gators
NCAA Championships
Silver medal – second place	2023 Fort Worth	Team
Bronze medal – third place	2026 Fort Worth	Team

Kayla Kecia DiCello (/diˈsɛloʊ/ or /diˈtʃɛloʊ/ or di-CHELL-o) (born January 25, 2004) is an American artistic gymnast. She is the 2021 World bronze medalist and the 2023 Pan American Games champion in the all-around. On the junior level, she is the 2019 Junior World vault champion and the 2019 U.S. Junior national all-around champion. She was an alternate for the 2020 Olympic team and the gold medal-winning 2023 World Championships team. She also competes for the University of Florida women's gymnastics team.

== Personal life ==
DiCello was born to Matt and Kecia DiCello in 2004, and has three siblings, two sisters named Karleigh and Kyra and a brother named Hunter. She began gymnastics when she was two. Kayla is of Italian descent on her father's side and German on her mother's. Kayla is a 2022 graduate of Northwest High School in Germantown, Maryland.

== Junior gymnastics career ==
DiCello was a HOPES gymnast in 2016 and became junior elite in 2017 after qualifying at the Brestyan's National Qualifier.

=== 2018 ===
DiCello was officially added to the junior national team after she was named to the team to compete at the 2018 Pacific Rim Gymnastics Championships. There she won gold in the team, vault, and uneven bars and silver in the all-around behind Jordan Bowers. She finished 4th on balance beam. In early July, DiCello competed at the American Classic where she finished first in the all-around with a score of 55.400, posting the highest score of the competition amongst both juniors and seniors. She also finished first on vault and balance beam, second on floor, and third on uneven bars. On July 28, DiCello competed at the 2018 U.S. Classic where she finished second behind Leanne Wong after falling off the balance beam.

With her placements at these three competitions, DiCello entered the August 2018 U.S. National Championships in Boston as one of the favorites for the Junior national title along with Wong, Bowers, and Sunisa Lee. After two days of competition in which she tallied an impressive score of 111.200, DiCello won the silver medal in the all-around competition, once again behind Wong. She performed well on both days of the competition and was the only junior gymnast to score in the top four on all four individual events: fourth on balance beam, third on uneven bars and floor exercise, and first on vault, where she stuck her double-twisting Yurchenko vault on the second day of competition to edge out Wong, the defending champion on the event. After her performance, she was once again named to the national team.

In November, DiCello announced that she had verbally committed to attend the University of Florida on a gymnastics scholarship.

=== 2019 ===
DiCello competed at the WOGA Classic in early February. She won the Junior All-Around title with a score of 55.700, outscoring the senior field as well. Later that month DiCello was named to the team to compete at the 2019 City of Jesolo Trophy. While there she sustained a calf injury and was only able to compete on uneven bars. During team finals, she helped the USA win silver behind Russia.

In June DiCello competed at the Junior World Championship Trials. She placed second behind Skye Blakely and was named to the team to compete at the 2019 Junior World Championships alongside Blakely and Sydney Barros. Together the team won bronze, finishing behind Russia and China. Individually she finished fourth in the all-around behind Russians Viktoria Listunova and Vladislava Urazova and Ou Yushan of China. She was the only competitor that qualified to all four event finals. On the first day of event finals DiCello won gold on vault, finishing ahead of competitors Jennifer Gadirova of Great Britain and Urazova and finished sixth on uneven bars. On the second day of event finals she won bronze on balance beam behind Elena Gerasimova of Russia and Wei Xiaoyuan of China and placed seventh on floor exercise.

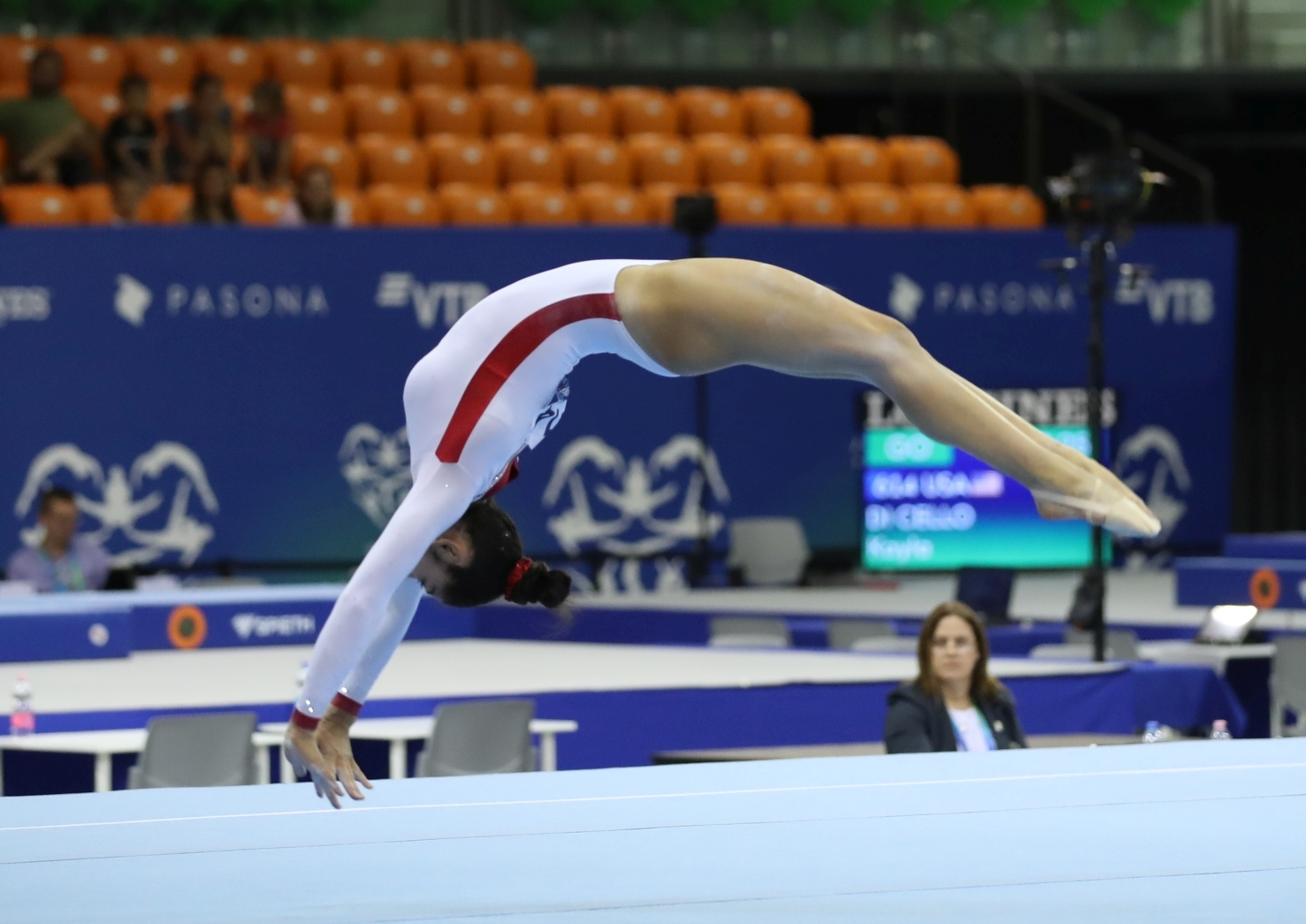
Floor Exercise Final

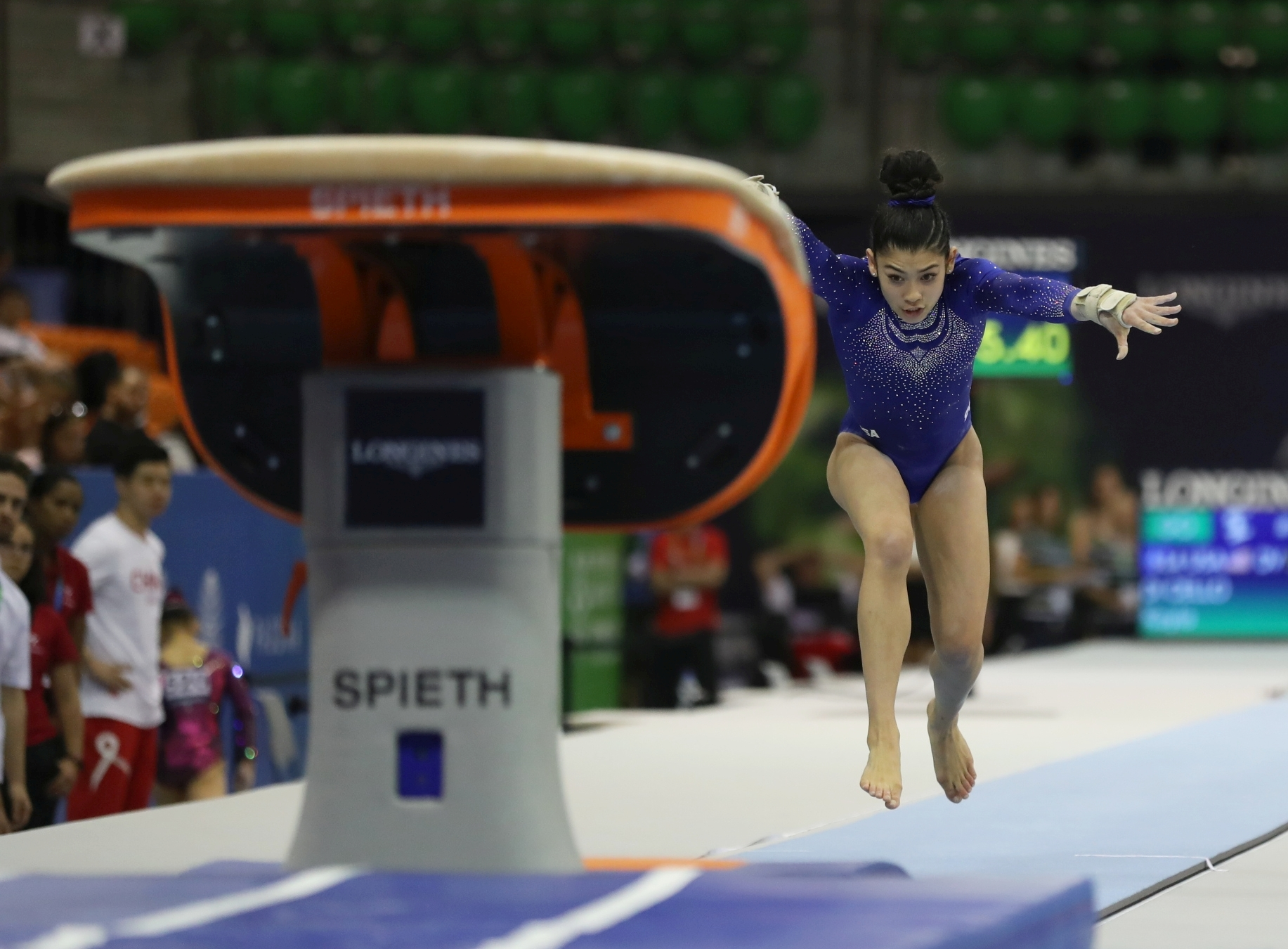
Vault Final

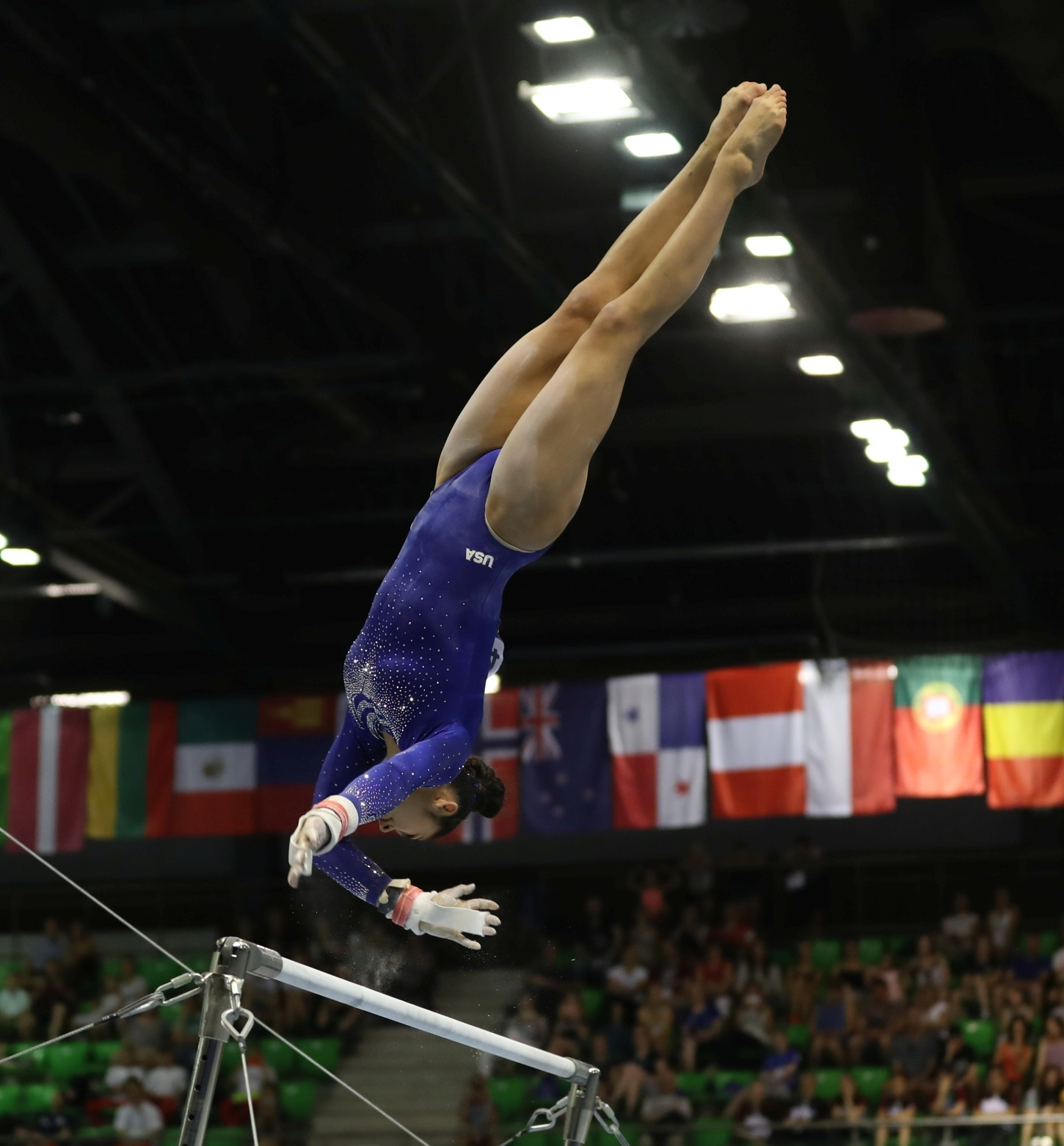
Uneven Bars Final

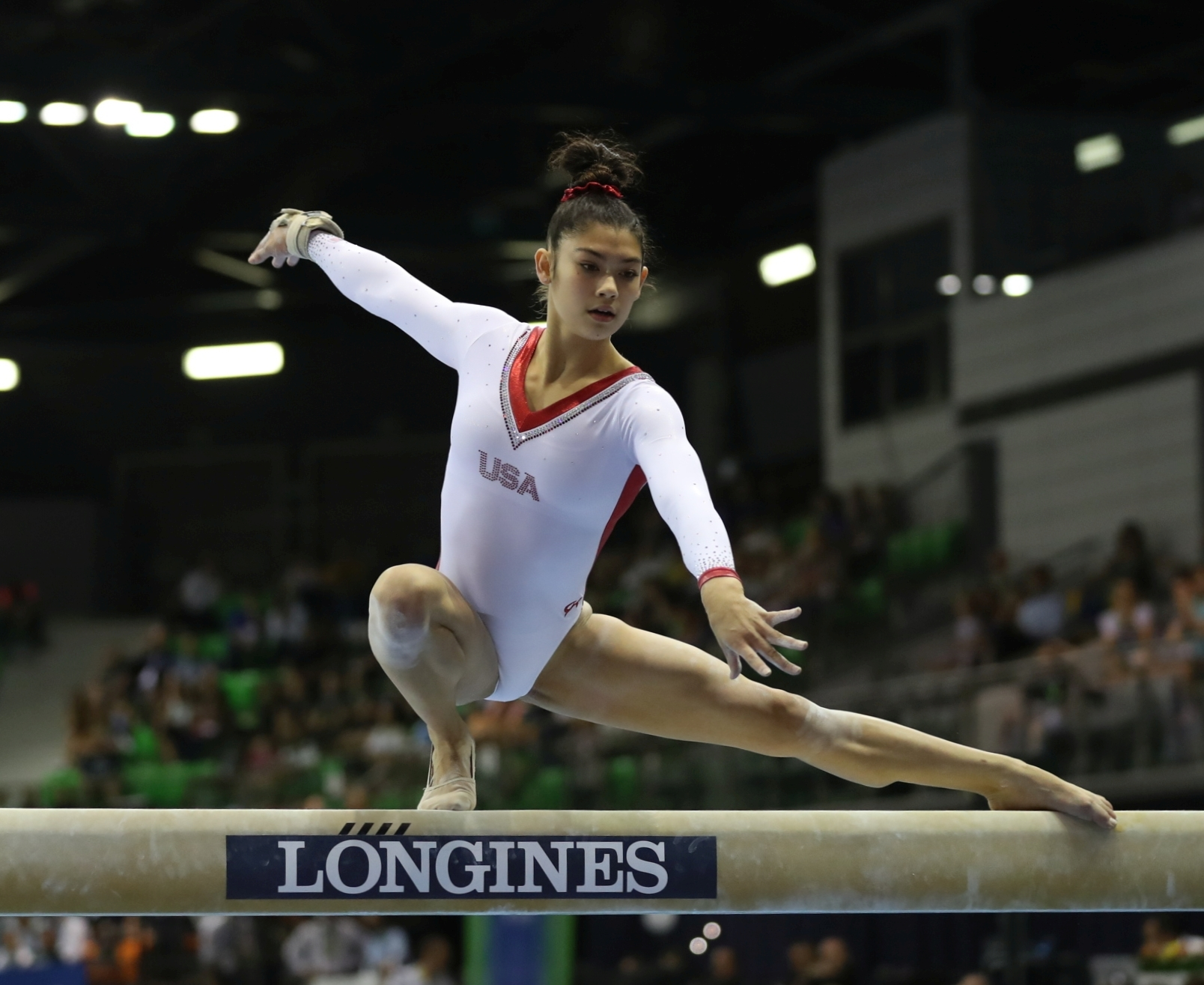
Balance Beam Final

DiCello at the 2019 Junior World Championships

In July DiCello competed at the U.S. Classic where uncharacteristic falls on the balance beam and floor exercise resulted in an eleventh-place finish in the all-around. She won bronze on uneven bars behind Olivia Greaves and Sydney Morris and placed seventh on vault.

In August DiCello competed at the U.S. National Championships. After the first day of competition she recorded a score of 56.000 and was in second behind Konnor McClain. During the second day of competition scored a 56.700, giving her a total combined score of 112.700 which was enough to win the gold in the all-around by one tenth over silver medalist McClain. This score would have placed her third all-around in the senior competition. Additionally DiCello won gold on vault and floor exercise, bronze on uneven bars behind Olivia Greaves and McClain, and placed fourth on balance beam behind McClain, Ciena Alipio, and Skye Blakely. At this competition, DiCello increased her floor difficulty by debuting a full-twisting double layout, or Chusovitina as her first tumbling pass.

== Senior gymnastics career ==
=== 2020 ===
In January it was announced that DiCello would make her senior debut at the American Cup, taking place on March 7. She finished in second place behind compatriot Morgan Hurd, with a score of 55.132 in the all-around. She posted the second highest score on vault behind Great Britain's Jennifer Gadirova and the third highest on floor behind Gadirova and Hurd.

=== 2021 ===
DiCello competed at the American Classic in April. She only competed on the uneven bars and on balance beam where she placed second behind Sunisa Lee and fifth respectively.

In May, DiCello competed at the GK US Classic, finishing third in the all-around behind Simone Biles and Jordan Chiles. She also placed first on the uneven bars, tied for ninth on balance beam with Emma Malabuyo, and placed third on floor exercise behind Biles and Chiles. At the National Championships DiCello finished 11th in the all-around after errors on uneven bars and balance beam on both days of the competition. She won silver on floor exercise behind Simone Biles. As a result, she was named to the national team and selected to compete at the Olympic Trials. At the Olympic Trials DiCello finished sixth in the all-around and was named as an alternate for the Olympic team alongside Leanne Wong, Kara Eaker, and Emma Malabuyo.

In October DiCello was selected to compete at the 2021 World Championships alongside Leanne Wong, Konnor McClain, and eMjae Frazier. While there she qualified for the all-around final in third place behind Angelina Melnikova and teammate Wong, the floor exercise final in fourth place, and the balance beam final in seventh place. She won third in the all-around final behind Angelina Melnikova and Leanne Wong.

In November DiCello signed her national letter of intent to compete for the Florida Gators.

=== 2022 ===
After not competing for the first half of the year, in July, DiCello was selected to compete at the Pan American Championships alongside Skye Blakely, Zoe Miller, Elle Mueller, and Lexi Zeiss. On the first day of competition she won gold on floor exercise and helped the United States qualify to the team final in second place. DiCello finished in only fifth place in the all-around due to downgrading on vault and falling on balance beam. During the team final DiCello competed on uneven bars, balance beam, and floor exercise, helping the United States win silver behind Brazil.

In August, DiCello competed at the National Championships with upgraded routines, most notably restoring her Baitova (double-twisting Yurchenko) on vault. She finished fourth in the all-around and third on balance beam, earning a spot on the national team. Despite her placement making her an early favorite for the 2022 World Championships team, DiCello did not compete at the selection camp, as she had begun training for the NCAA collegiate season at the University of Florida.

=== 2023 ===
In late April, DiCello announced that she would take a gap year from the University of Florida and return to elite-level training with coach Kelli Hill in order to pursue her goal of making the 2024 Olympic team. DiCello placed eighth at the 2023 National Championships, earning an automatic spot on the national team for the sixth straight year.

In September DiCello was named to the team for the 2023 World Championships alongside Simone Biles, Shilese Jones, Leanne Wong, Skye Blakely, and Joscelyn Roberson; DiCello was designated as the traveling alternate. Additionally, she was named to the team to compete at the 2023 Pan American Games alongside Jordan Chiles, Kaliya Lincoln, Zoe Miller, and Tiana Sumanasekera. At the World Championships, DiCello was on the competition floor supporting the team during team finals as the United States won their record-breaking seventh consecutive World team title. As the alternate DiCello, was also awarded the medal.

At the Pan American Games, the United States won the gold medal in the team competition; DiCello also qualified to the all-around and floor exercise finals in second place and the balance beam final in fifth place. Additionally, she earned the fourth highest-score on uneven bars behind teammates Miller and Chiles, but was excluded from the final by the two-per-country rule.

In the all-around final, DiCello won the gold medal ahead of Flávia Saraiva and Chiles with a score of 54.699, her highest all-around mark of the year. She earned the highest scores of the day on uneven bars and floor exercise. In event finals, DiCello placed fourth on balance beam and won silver on floor exercise behind Lincoln, tying with reigning World bronze medalist Saraiva.

=== 2024 ===
DiCello made her Olympic season debut in late February at the 2024 Winter Cup. She hit all four routines, debuting new upgrades on the uneven bars, balance beam, and floor exercise, to take the all-around title with a score of 56.850, more than two points ahead of World Championships teammate Skye Blakely and reigning US junior national champion Hezly Rivera. This score was her highest all-around mark ever recorded, and the third highest all-around mark recorded by an American woman in the 2022-2024 quadrennium after reigning World all-around medalists Simone Biles and Shilese Jones.

DiCello also won the gold medals on uneven bars, ahead of University of Florida NCAA teammate Trinity Thomas in her return to elite competition, and on floor exercise, ahead of reigning Pan American Games champion Kaliya Lincoln, and Rivera. She placed third on balance beam behind Blakely and Rivera, and tied with Blakely for the highest vault score. This performance solidified DiCello's status as a contender for the Olympic team.

At the National Championships DiCello placed third in the all-around and second on uneven bars behind Simone Biles and Skye Blakely. Additionally she finished second on floor exercise behind Biles. As a result, she qualified to the 2024 Olympic Trials. On the first day of the U.S. Olympic Trials, DiCello injured her Achilles and withdrew from the competition, thus ending her Olympic bid.

== Collegiate gymnastics career ==
=== 2022–2023 ===
DiCello made her collegiate debut for the Florida Gators on January 6, 2023, in a meet against West Virginia, Ball State, and Lindenwood University. She competed in the all-around, earning the highest all-around score of the night with a 39.475 and the highest ever for a Gator freshmen in her collegiate opener.

In the next meet versus no. 02 Auburn, DiCello won the uneven bars and beam events (with collegiate bests) and placed second in the all-around. She was named the SEC Specialist Gymnast of the Week for posting 9.0+s. At their first home SEC dual meet with Alabama, DicCello won on bars and beam, her first apparatus wins. After that performance she was named SEC Freshman Gymnast of the Week.

At the 2023 SEC Gymnastics Championship, DiCello helped Florida win their second consecutive championship. With a 9.95 on the balance beam she shared second place, matched her collegiate best (9.95) on floor exercise and shared second place, and was the highest ranking freshmen to place in the all around with a 39.60. For her regular season performance she is one of four freshmen to receive Women's Collegiate Gymnastics Association (WCGA) All-American honors. Her three second-team honors were earned in the all-around, uneven bars, and balance beam.

At the Pittsburgh Regional Final Day 1, DiCello hit a perfect 10.0 for her uneven bars routine, becoming the only freshmen to earn multiple perfect marks in 2023. She also scored her collegiate best in the all-around with 39.80, winning the event, alongside bars and beam. On Day 2, DiCello's consistency on bars and beam helped Florida to advance to the semifinals.

DiCello finished the season strong at the 2023 NCAA women's gymnastics tournament, DicCello earned two second team All-American honors for her performance in the semifinals, all-around (39.500, 7th) and balance beam (9.925). While Florida came up short as the runner-up to Oklahoma, she scored 9.90+ on all events in the final and was the leading freshmen in the NCAA tournament for all-around.

DiCello was named 2023 SEC Freshman of the Year, 2023 All-SEC, and 2023 All-SEC Freshman. She earned SEC First Year Academic Honor Roll accolades for keeping her GPA above a 3.0+ in her freshmen year.

=== 2023–2024 ===
DiCello deferred competing during the 2024 season in order to return to elite gymnastics in hopes of the making the 2024 USA Olympic team. However she was injured while performing her vault at the Olympic Trials. As a result, she redshirted the 2024 NCAA season. She still earned 2025 WCGA Scholastic All-American honors, earning a GPA of 3.5+ the previous academic year. She was also named to the 2024 SEC Academic Honor Roll.

=== Collegiate Perfect 10.0 ===
Season	Date	Event	Meet
2023	February 10, 2023	Uneven bars	Mizzouri
2023	March 31, 2023	Uneven bars	NCAA Regional

=== Regular season ranking ===
Season	All-around	Vault	Uneven bars	Balance beam	Floor exercise
2023	13th	44th	14th	9th	60th
2025	N/A	N/A	N/A	N/A	N/A
2026	N/A	50th	8th	5th	N/A

== Selected competitive skills ==
Apparatus	Name	Description	Difficulty (Note: Valid for the 2017–2020 Code of Points)	Performed
Vault	Baitova	Yurchenko entry, laid out salto backwards with two twists	5.4	2020–24
Uneven Bars	Church	Toe-on Tkatchev piked	E	2022–24
Uneven Bars	Hindorff	Clear-hip Tkatchev straddled	E	2024
Uneven Bars	Piked Jaeger	Reverse grip swing to piked salto forwards to catch high bar	E	2020–24
Uneven Bars	Van Leeuwen	Toe-on Shaposhnikova transition with ½ twist to high bar	E	2021–24
Balance Beam	Double Pike	Dismount: Double piked salto backwards	E	2023
Balance Beam	Mitchell	1080° (3/1) turn in tuck stand on one leg	E	2020–24
Balance Beam	Split leap 1/1	Tour jeté with additional 180° (1/2) turn	E	2024
Floor Exercise]	Mitchell	1080° (3/1) turn in tuck stand on one leg	E	2020–24
Floor Exercise]	Double Layout	Double laid out salto backwards	F	2021–22
Floor Exercise]	Chusovitina	Full-twisting (1/1) double laid out salto backwards	H	2020, 2022
Floor Exercise]	Silivas	Double-twisting (2/1) double tucked salto backwards	H	2021, 2023–24

== Competitive history ==
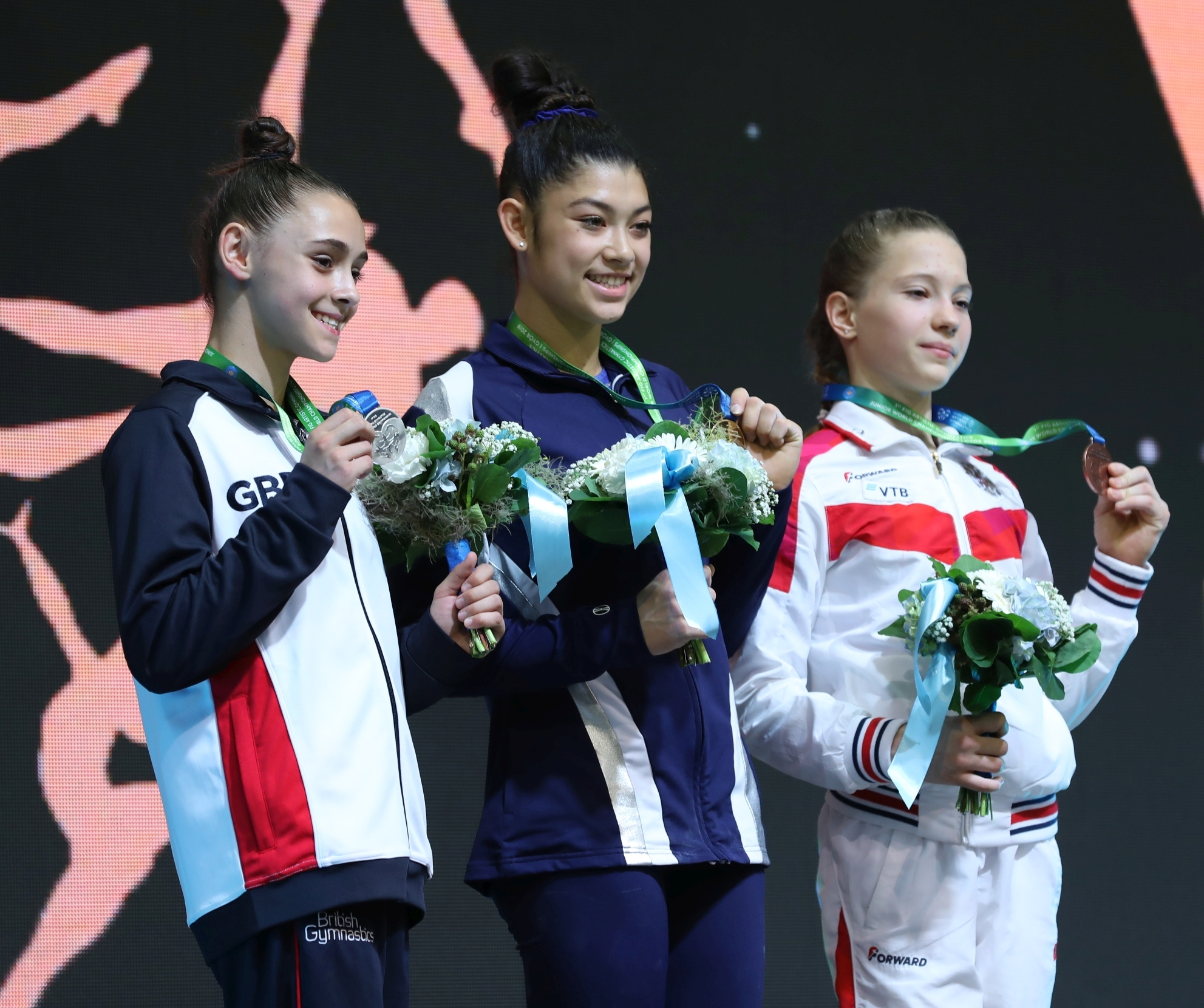
DiCello (center) on the vault podium at the 2019 Junior World Championships

Competitive history of Kayla DiCello at the junior level
Year	Event	Team	AA	VT	UB	BB	FX
2016	Hopes Championships		4	6	1st place, gold medalist(s)		
2017	Brestyan's National Qualifier		3rd place, bronze medalist(s)				
2017	International Gymnix		5		6		3rd place, bronze medalist(s)
2017	American Classic		5	12	16	4	4
2017	U.S. Classic		26	19	29	21	15
2017	P&G National Championships		13	12	7	28	10
2018	WOGA Classic		1st place, gold medalist(s)				
2018	International Gymnix		4		6	1st place, gold medalist(s)	8
2018	Pacific Rim Championships	1st place, gold medalist(s)	2nd place, silver medalist(s)	1st place, gold medalist(s)	1st place, gold medalist(s)	4	
2018	American Classic		1st place, gold medalist(s)	1st place, gold medalist(s)	3rd place, bronze medalist(s)	1st place, gold medalist(s)	2nd place, silver medalist(s)
2018	U.S. Classic		2nd place, silver medalist(s)	2nd place, silver medalist(s)	1st place, gold medalist(s)	28	3rd place, bronze medalist(s)
2018	U.S. National Championships		2nd place, silver medalist(s)	1st place, gold medalist(s)	3rd place, bronze medalist(s)	4	3rd place, bronze medalist(s)
2019	WOGA Classic		1st place, gold medalist(s)				
2019	City of Jesolo Trophy	2nd place, silver medalist(s)					
2019	Jr. World Championships Trials		2nd place, silver medalist(s)				
2019	Junior World Championships	3rd place, bronze medalist(s)	4	1st place, gold medalist(s)	6	3rd place, bronze medalist(s)	7
2019	U.S. Classic		11	7	3rd place, bronze medalist(s)	34	21
2019	U.S. National Championships		1st place, gold medalist(s)	1st place, gold medalist(s)	3rd place, bronze medalist(s)	4	1st place, gold medalist(s)

Competitive history of Kayla DiCello at the senior level
Year	Event	Team	AA	VT	UB	BB	FX
2020	American Cup		2nd place, silver medalist(s)				
2021	American Classic				2nd place, silver medalist(s)	7	
2021	U.S. Classic		3rd place, bronze medalist(s)		1st place, gold medalist(s)	9	3rd place, bronze medalist(s)
2021	U.S. National Championships		11		18	19	2nd place, silver medalist(s)
2021	Olympic Trials		6		10	6	5
2021	World Team Trials		1st place, gold medalist(s)				
2021	World Championships		3rd place, bronze medalist(s)			8	5
2022
2022	Pan American Championships	2nd place, silver medalist(s)					1st place, gold medalist(s)
2022	U.S. National Championships		4		7	3rd place, bronze medalist(s)	5
2023	U.S. Classic		11		25	7	7
2023	U.S. National Championships		8		13	22	5
2023	World Championships	(gold) (Note: DiCello was the team USA alternate)					
2023	Pan American Games	1st place, gold medalist(s)	1st place, gold medalist(s)			4	2nd place, silver medalist(s)
2024	Winter Cup		1st place, gold medalist(s)		1st place, gold medalist(s)	3rd place, bronze medalist(s)	1st place, gold medalist(s)
2024	U.S. Classic		12		26	10	25
2024	U.S. National Championships		3rd place, bronze medalist(s)		9	8	2nd place, silver medalist(s)
2024	Olympic Trials		WD				

Competitive history of Kayla DiCello at the NCAA level
Year	Event	Team	AA	VT	UB	BB	FX
2023	SEC Championships	1st place, gold medalist(s)	6	37	8	2nd place, silver medalist(s)	2nd place, silver medalist(s)
2023	NCAA Championships	2nd place, silver medalist(s)	11	44	27	13	26
2026	SEC Championships	1st place, gold medalist(s)	2nd place, silver medalist(s)		2nd place, silver medalist(s)	2nd place, silver medalist(s)	
2026	NCAA Championships	3rd place, bronze medalist(s)	4	19	13	17	25
