= 2021 U.S. Classic =

2021 GK U.S. Classic
- Venue: Indiana Convention Center
- Location: Indianapolis, Indiana
- Dates: May 21–22, 2021

Medalists
gold medal	Simone Biles; Katelyn Jong
silver medal	Jordan Chiles; Kailin Chio
bronze medal	Kayla DiCello; Gabriella Van Frayen

The 2021 U.S. Classic, known as the 2021 GK U.S. Classic for sponsorship reasons, is the 37th edition of the U.S. Classic gymnastics tournament. The competition was held on May 21–22, 2021, at the Indiana Convention Center in Indianapolis, Indiana.

== Medalists ==
Event	Gold	Silver	Bronze
Senior
All-Around	Simone Biles	Jordan Chiles	Kayla DiCello
Vault	MyKayla Skinner	Jordan Chiles	Shilese Jones
Uneven Bars	Kayla DiCello	Jordan Chiles	Skye Blakely
Balance Beam	Simone Biles	Leanne Wong	Kara Eaker
Floor Exercise	Simone Biles	Jordan Chiles	Kayla DiCello
Junior
All-Around	Katelyn Jong	Kailin Chio	Gabriella Van Frayen
Vault	Katelyn Jong	Joscelyn Roberson	Kaliya Lincoln
Uneven Bars	Katelyn Jong	Gabriella Van Frayen	Kailin Chio
Balance Beam	Katelyn Jong	Tiana Sumanasekera	Kailin Chio
Floor Exercise	Kaliya Lincoln	Katelyn Jong	Joscelyn Roberson

== Results ==
=== Seniors ===
Rank	Gymnast	Gym	Vault (gymnastics)	Uneven bars	Balance beam	Floor (gymnastics)	Total
1st place, gold medalist(s)	Simone Biles	World Champions Centre	16.100	13.200	14.850	14.250	58.400
2nd place, silver medalist(s)	Jordan Chiles	World Champions Centre	14.950	14.150	14.050	13.950	57.100
3rd place, bronze medalist(s)	Kayla DiCello	Hill's Gymnastics	14.350	14.600	13.300	13.850	56.100
4	Grace McCallum	Twin City Twisters	14.400	13.200	13.950	13.550	55.100
5	Aleah Finnegan	GAGE	14.250	13.200	13.400	13.300	54.150
6	Leanne Wong	GAGE	14.200	11.900	14.450	13.550	54.100
7	Skye Blakely	WOGA	14.000	14.050	12.650	13.300	54.000
8	Emily Lee	West Valley Gymnastics	14.250	12.150	13.700	13.800	53.900
9	Kara Eaker	GAGE	12.850	13.750	14.100	12.550	53.250
10	MyKayla Skinner	Desert Lights Gymnastics	14.700	13.400	12.050	12.900	53.050
11	Ava Siegfeldt	World Class Gymnastics	14.050	13.550	12.900	12.200	52.700
12	eMjae Frazier	Parkettes Gymnastics	13.950	13.050	11.950	12.850	51.800
12	Karis German	World Champions Centre	13.650	13.250	12.450	12.450	51.800
14	Zoe Miller	World Champions Centre	13.500	14.000	11.750	12.000	51.250
15	Kaylen Morgan	Everest Gymnastics	13.450	13.000	12.050	12.700	51.200
16	Amari Drayton	World Champions Centre	14.100	13.450	11.800	11.750	51.100
17	Elle Mueller	Twin City Twisters	13.200	13.200	12.050	12.450	50.900
18	Lexi Zeiss	Omaha Gymnastics	13.600	13.000	11.650	12.550	50.800
19	Sydney Barros	World Champions Centre	14.050	12.350	12.250	11.900	50.550
20	Anya Pilgrim	Hill's Gymnastics	13.350	13.450	11.200	12.300	50.300
21	Skylar Draser	Parkettes Gymnastics	13.400	13.100	12.100	11.450	50.050
22	Hailey Klein	Flips Gymnastics	13.800	11.350	12.750	12.100	50.000
23	Katelyn Rosen	Mavericks Gymnastics	13.650	10.400	12.900	13.000	49.950
24	Temple Landry	Twin City Twisters	13.000	12.000	12.400	12.450	49.850
25	Sophia Butler	Discover Gymnastics	13.350	12.100	11.700	12.050	49.200
26	Alonna Kratzer	Top Notch Training Center	13.750	11.150	11.800	11.400	48.100
27	Jamison Sears	World Class Gymnastics	12.750	11.200	11.050	12.100	47.100
28	Shilese Jones	Future Gymnastics Academy	14.850	12.950	12.100	–	39.900
29	Mya Witte	Genie's Gymnastics	13.100	–	13.100	11.950	38.150
30	Konnor McClain	Revolution Gymnastics	14.400	11.100	11.800	–	25.700
31	Ciena Alipio	Midwest Gymnastics Center	–	13.100	11.300	12.150	36.550
32	Emma Malabuyo	Texas Dreams Gymnastics	–	13.750	13.300	–	27.050
33	Sunisa Lee	Midwest Gymnastics Center	–	13.500	13.350	–	26.850
34	Addison Fatta	Prestige Gymnastics	–	13.800	12.750	–	26.550
34	Jade Carey	Arizona Sunrays	–	13.800	12.750	–	26.550
36	Morgan Hurd	First State Gymnastics	–	–	13.200	12.900	26.100
37	Chellsie Memmel	M and M Gymnastics	13.750	–	11.800	–	25.550
38	Laurie Hernandez	Gym-Max Gymnastics	13.250	–	12.200	–	25.450
39	Riley McCusker	Arizona Sunrays	14.400	–	–	–	14.400
40	Lauren Little	Everest Gymnastics	–	12.050	–	–	12.050

=== Juniors ===
Rank	Gymnast	Gym	Vault (gymnastics)	Uneven bars	Balance beam	Floor (gymnastics)	Total
1st place, gold medalist(s)	Katelyn Jong	Metroplex Gymnastics	14.200	13.300	13.750	13.500	54.750
2nd place, silver medalist(s)	Kailin Chio	Gymcats Gymnastics	13.900	13.100	11.800	12.950	51.750
3rd place, bronze medalist(s)	Gabriella Van Frayen	Gym X-Treme	13.400	13.150	12.400	12.750	51.700
4	Izzy Stassi	Gym X-Treme	13.200	12.950	12.550	12.650	51.350
5	Joscelyn Roberson	North East Texas Elite	14.100	11.350	12.600	13.250	51.300
6	Charlotte Booth	Brandy Johnson's	13.900	12.650	12.400	12.100	51.050
7	Sage Bradford	WOGA	13.050	12.450	12.800	12.350	50.650
8	Ella Murphy	WOGA	13.300	12.550	12.100	12.650	50.600
9	Azaraya Ra-Akbar	World Class Gymnastics	13.450	12.550	10.950	13.250	50.200
10	Tiana Sumanasekera	West Valley Gymnastics	13.850	10.850	13.400	12.050	50.150
11	Lucy Tobia	Parkettes Gymnastics	12.900	12.900	11.300	12.850	49.950
12	Paityn Walker	Head Over Heels	13.250	12.700	11.700	12.100	49.750
13	Autumn Reingold	Gymnastics Olympica USA	12.700	13.050	11.400	12.000	49.150
14	Avery King	WOGA	13.300	12.100	10.600	12.900	48.900
15	Zoey Molomo	Metroplex Gymnastics	13.200	11.450	11.900	12.300	48.850
16	Kaliya Lincoln	WOGA	14.050	11.250	9.900	13.600	48.800
17	Madray Johnson	WOGA	13.350	10.450	12.400	12.500	48.700
18	Nola Matthews	Airborne Gymnastics	12.950	12.450	12.150	–	37.550
19	Paloma Spiridonova	WOGA	–	–	13.350	13.150	26.500
20	Ella Kate Parker	Cincinnati Gymnastics	13.500	–	–	–	13.500

== Participants ==
=== Seniors ===
- Ciena Alipio – San Jose, California (Midwest Gymnastics Center)
- Sydney Barros – Lewisville, Texas (World Champions Centre)
- Simone Biles – Spring, Texas (World Champions Centre)
- Skye Blakely – Frisco, Texas (WOGA Gymnastics)
- Sophia Butler – Houston, Texas (Discover Gymnastics)
- Jade Carey – Phoenix, Arizona (Arizona Sunrays)
- Jordan Chiles – Spring, Texas (World Champions Centre)
- Kayla DiCello – Boyds, Maryland (Hill's Gymnastics)
- Skylar Draser – Breinigsville, Pennsylvania (Parkettes)
- Amari Drayton – Spring, Texas (World Champions Centre)
- Kara Eaker – Grain Valley, Missouri (GAGE)
- Addison Fatta – Wrightsville, Pennsylvania (Prestige Gymnastics)
- Aleah Finnegan – Lee's Summit, Missouri (GAGE)
- eMjae Frazier – Erial, New Jersey (Parkettes)
- Karis German – Spring, Texas (World Champions Centre)
- Laurie Hernandez – Old Bridge, New Jersey (Gym-Max Gymnastics)
- Morgan Hurd – Middletown, Delaware (First State Gymnastics)
- Shilese Jones – Westerville, Ohio (Future Gymnastics Academy)
- Hailey Klein – Lake Forest, Illinois (Flips Gymnastics North Shore)
- Alonna Kratzer – Suwanee, Georgia (Top Notch Training Center)
- Temple Landry – Maple Grove, Minnesota (Twin City Twisters)
- Emily Lee – Los Gatos, California (West Valley Gymnastics School)
- Sunisa Lee – St. Paul, Minnesota (Midwest Gymnastics Center)
- Lauren Little – Mooresville, North Carolina (Everest Gymnastics)
- Emma Malabuyo – Flower Mound, Texas (Texas Dreams Gymnastics)
- Grace McCallum – Isanti, Minnesota (Twin City Twisters)
- Konnor McClain – Cross Lanes, West Virginia (Revolution Gymnastics)
- Riley McCusker – Brielle, New Jersey (Arizona Sunrays)
- Chellsie Memmel – Dousman, Wisconsin (M and M Gymnastics)
- Zoe Miller – Spring, Texas (World Champions Centre)
- Kaylen Morgan – Huntersville, North Carolina (Everest Gymnastics)
- Elle Mueller – Ham Lake, Minnesota (Twin City Twisters)
- Anya Pilgrim – Germantown, Maryland (Hill's Gymnastics)
- Katelyn Rosen – Boerne, Texas (Mavericks Gymnastics)
- Lyden Saltness – Chisago City, Minnesota (Midwest Gymnastics Center)
- Jamison Sears – Yorktown, Virginia (World Class Gymnastics)
- Ava Siegfeldt – Williamsburg, Virginia (World Class Gymnastics)
- MyKayla Skinner – Gilbert, Arizona (Desert Lights Gymnastics)
- Faith Torrez – Bristol, Wisconsin (Legacy Elite Gymnastics)
- Mya Witte – Greenacres, Florida (Genie's Gymnastics)
- Leanne Wong – Overland Park, Kansas (GAGE)
- Lexi Zeiss – Omaha, Nebraska (Omaha Gymnastics Academy)

=== Juniors ===
- Charlotte Booth – Clermont, Florida (Brandy Johnson's)
- Sage Bradford – Flower Mound, Texas (WOGA Gymnastics)
- Kailin Chio – Henderson, Nevada (Gymcats Gymnastics)
- Madray Johnson – Dallas, Texas (WOGA Gymnastics)
- Katelyn Jong – Allen, Texas (Metroplex Gymnastics)
- Avery King – Dallas, Texas (WOGA Gymnastics)
- Kaliya Lincoln – Frisco, Texas (WOGA Gymnastics)
- Nola Matthews – Gilroy, California (Airborne Gymnastics)
- Zoey Molomo – Frisco, Texas (Metroplex Gymnastics)
- Ella Murphy – Frisco, Texas (WOGA Gymnastics)
- Ella Kate Parker – West Chester, Ohio (Cincinnati Gymnastics)
- Azaraya Ra-Akbar – Columbia, Maryland (World Class Gymnastics)
- Autumn Reingold – Van Nuys, California (Gymnastics Olympica USA)
- Joscelyn Roberson – Texarkana, Texas (North East Texas Elite)
- Paloma Spiridonova – Torrance, California (WOGA Gymnastics)
- Izzy Stassi – North Royalton, Ohio (Gym X-Treme)
- Tiana Sumanasekera – Pleasanton, California (West Valley)
- Lucy Tobia – Schnecksville, Pennsylvania (Parkettes)
- Gabriella Van Frayen – Lewis Center, Ohio (Gym X-Treme)
- Paityn Walker – Hercules, California (Head Over Heels)
