= Tiana Sumanasekera =

American-Sri Lankan artistic gymnast (born 2007)

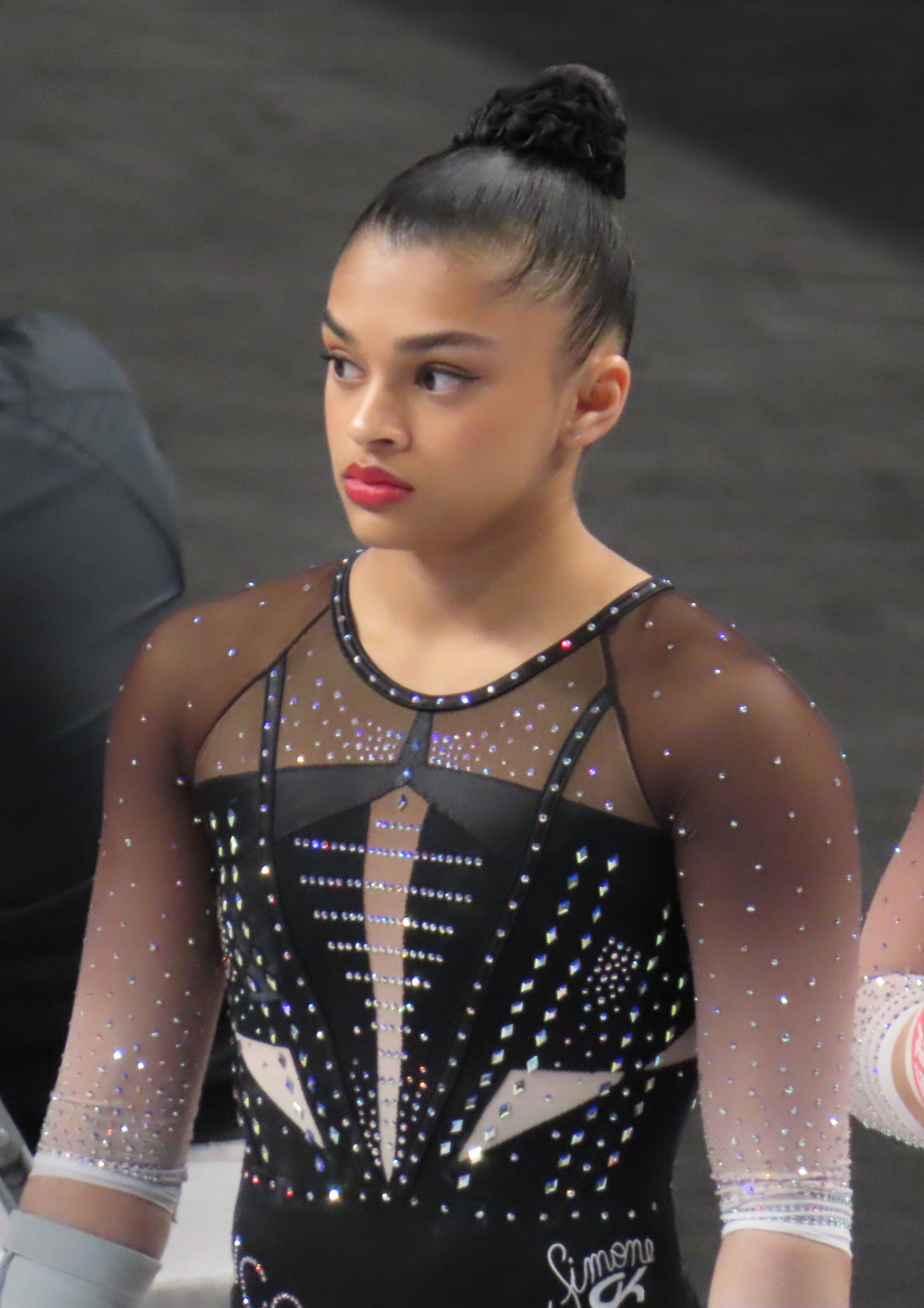
- Sumanasekera at the 2024 U.S. Championships

Personal information
- Full name: Tiana Sumanasekera
- Nickname: T
- Born: September 15, 2007 (age 19) Fremont, California, U.S

Gymnastics career
- Discipline: Women's artistic gymnastics
- Country represented: Sri Lanka; (2026–present)
- Former countries represented: United States (2021–2025)
- College team: UCLA Bruins (2026–2029)
- Club: World Champions Centre
- Head coaches: Laurent Landi; Cecile Canqueteau-Landi
Medal record
Women's artistic gymnastics
Representing the United States
Pan American Games
Gold medal – first place	2023 Santiago	Team
Pan American Championships
Gold medal – first place	2023 Medellín	Team
Gold medal – first place	2023 Medellín	All-around
Gold medal – first place	2023 Medellín	Balance beam
Gold medal – first place	2025 Panama City	Team
Silver medal – second place	2023 Medellín	Floor exercise

Tiana Sumanasekera (born September 15, 2007) is a American and Sri Lankan artistic gymnast. Formerly representing the United States, she is the 2023 Pan American all-around and balance beam champion. At the NCAA level, she is currently a member of the UCLA Bruins gymnastics team. Starting in 2026, she began representing Sri Lanka in international competition.

== Early life ==
Sumanasekera was born to Rajitha and Ruwangi Sumanasekera in 2007. She started gymnastics in 2013. She is of Sri Lankan descent. Sumanasekera is believed to be the first gymnast of Sri Lankan descent to represent the U.S. in international competition.

== Junior gymnastics career ==
Sumanasekera competed at the 2021 Winter Cup where she placed seventh in the all-around. She next competed at the American Classic where she placed eighth in the all-around but won gold on floor exercise and silver on vault. Sumanasekera competed at the U.S. Classic where she finished tenth in the all-around.

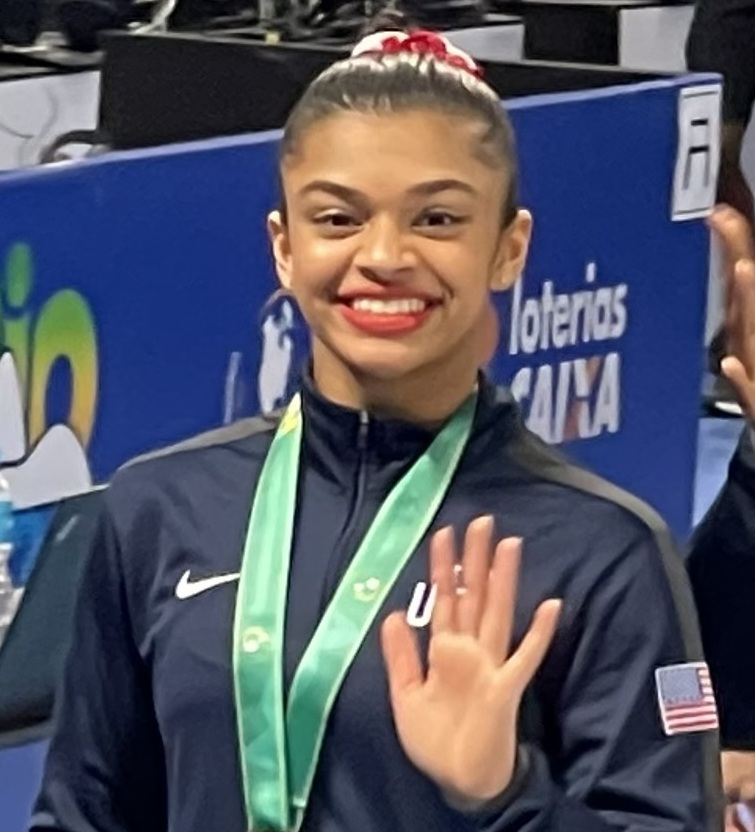
Sumanasekera at the 2022 Pan American Championships

In November, Sumanasekera was selected to represent the United States at the inaugural Junior Pan American Games alongside Katelyn Jong, Madray Johnson, and Kailin Chio. While there, she helped the United States place first as a team, and individually, she won gold on vault.

Sumanasekera competed at the 2022 Winter Cup where she finished seventh in the all-around but first on vault and floor exercise. As a result, she was selected to compete at the upcoming DTB Pokal Team Challenge in Stuttgart alongside Myli Lew, Ella Kate Parker, Ella Murphy, and Hezly Rivera. While there, Sumanasekera helped the team finish first and individually, she won gold on vault and silver on balance beam. In April, Sumanasekera competed at the 2022 City of Jesolo Trophy alongside Lew, Murphy, Madray Johnson, Zoey Molomo, and Gabby Van Frayen. They won the team event, and Sumanasekera won the all-around competition. During event finals, she picked up an additional three gold medals on vault, balance beam, and floor exercise.

In July, Sumanasekera was selected to compete at the 2022 Pan American Championships alongside Molomo, Dulcy Caylor, and Alicia Zhou, where she helped the United States win the team gold and won an additional three medals in the vault, balance beam, and floor exercise event finals.

== Senior gymnastics career ==
=== 2023–2025: Representing the United States ===
Sumanasekera became age-eligible for senior level competition in 2023. She made her senior debut at the 2023 Winter Cup where she only competed on uneven bars and balance beam. In April she was named to the team to compete at the 2023 Pan American Championships alongside Zoe Miller, Addison Fatta, Joscelyn Roberson, Nola Matthews and traveling replacement athlete Madray Johnson. During the competition she won gold in the all-around and on balance beam and won silver on floor exercise behind teammate Roberson. During the team final Sumanasekera contributed scores on vault, balance beam, and floor exercise towards the USA's first place finish. In September, Sumanasekera was named to the team to compete at the 2023 Pan American Games alongside Jordan Chiles, Kayla DiCello, Kaliya Lincoln, and Miller. Together they won gold as a team.

Sumanasekera competed at the 2024 City of Jesolo Trophy where helped the USA finish third as a team behind Italy and Brazil. She next competed at the 2024 Core Hydration Classic where she finished sixth in the all-around. At the 2024 National Championships Sumanasekera placed ninth in the all-around and third on floor exercise behind Simone Biles and Kayla DiCello. As a result, she qualified for the 2024 Olympic Trials. At the Olympic trials, Sumanasekera finished eighth in the all-around and third on balance beam behind Joscelyn Roberson and Hezly Rivera. She was named as a non-traveling alternate for the 2024 Olympic team.

Sumanasekera was selected to compete at the 2025 Pan American Championships alongside Dulcy Caylor, Jayla Hang, Gabrielle Hardie, Hezly Rivera, and alternate Alessia Rosa. During the team final she contributed a score on the balance beam towards the United States' first place finish. At the 2025 U.S. National Championships she finished ninth in the all-around.

=== 2026–present: Representing Sri Lanka ===
In June 2026, Sumanasekera announced that going forward she would be representing Sri Lanka in international competition, describing the decision as both a proud and emotional milestone in her career. She announced that she would make her debut for Sri Lanka at the 2026 Commonwealth Games where she'd only compete on balance beam due to a shoulder injury.

== NCAA gymnastics career ==
=== Regular season rankings ===
Season	All-Around	Vault	Uneven Bars	Balance Beam	Floor Exercise
2026	18	40	88	17	47

== Competitive history ==
Competitive history of Tiana Sumanasekera at the junior level
Year	Event	Team	AA	VT	UB	BB	FX
2021	Winter Cup		7	4	11	7	2nd place, silver medalist(s)
2021	American Classic		8	2nd place, silver medalist(s)	14	12	1st place, gold medalist(s)
2021	U.S. Classic		10	6	17	2nd place, silver medalist(s)	17
2021	Junior Pan American Games	1st place, gold medalist(s)		1st place, gold medalist(s)			
2022	Winter Cup		7	1st place, gold medalist(s)	22	2nd place, silver medalist(s)	1st place, gold medalist(s)
2022	DTB Pokal Team Challenge	1st place, gold medalist(s)		1st place, gold medalist(s)		2nd place, silver medalist(s)	
2022	City of Jesolo Trophy	1st place, gold medalist(s)	1st place, gold medalist(s)	1st place, gold medalist(s)		1st place, gold medalist(s)	1st place, gold medalist(s)
2022	Pan American Championships	1st place, gold medalist(s)	2nd place, silver medalist(s)	1st place, gold medalist(s)		1st place, gold medalist(s)	1st place, gold medalist(s)
2022	U.S. National Championships		9	2nd place, silver medalist(s)	26	6	1st place, gold medalist(s)

Competitive history of Tiana Sumanasekera at the senior level representing the United States
Year	Event	Team	AA	VT	UB	BB	FX
2023	Winter Cup				12	7	
2023	Pan American Championships	1st place, gold medalist(s)	1st place, gold medalist(s)			1st place, gold medalist(s)	2nd place, silver medalist(s)
2023	U.S. Classic		10		27	5	10
2023	U.S. National Championships		8		23	6	13
2023	Pan American Games	1st place, gold medalist(s)					
2024	City of Jesolo Trophy	3rd place, bronze medalist(s)	8				6
2024	U.S. Classic		6		19	17	4
2024	U.S. National Championships		9		23	7	3rd place, bronze medalist(s)
2024	Olympic Trials		8		12	3rd place, bronze medalist(s)	6
2025
2025	Pan American Championships	1st place, gold medalist(s)					
2025	U.S. National Championships		9		22	6	13

Competitive history of Tiana Sumanasekera at the senior level representing Sri Lanka
Year	Event	Team	AA	VT	UB	BB	FX
2026
2026	Commonwealth Games					28	

Competitive history of Tiana Sumanasekera at the NCAA level
Year	Event	Team	AA	VT	UB	BB	FX
2026	Big Ten Championships	1st place, gold medalist(s)	2nd place, silver medalist(s)			2nd place, silver medalist(s)	2nd place, silver medalist(s)
2026	NCAA Championships	5	12	21	16	41	25
