= Morgan Hurd =

American artistic gymnast (born 2001)

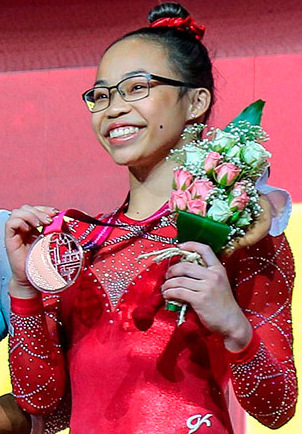
- Hurd at the 2018 World Artistic Gymnastics Championships

Personal information
- Full name: Morgan Elizabeth Hurd
- Born: July 18, 2001 (age 25) Wuzhou, China
- Height: 4 ft 9 in (145 cm)

Gymnastics career
- Discipline: Women's artistic gymnastics
- Country represented: United States; (2016–2021)
- College team: Florida Gators (2022–24)
- Club: First State Gymnastics
- Head coach: Slava Glazounov
- Assistant coach: Brooke Parker
- Retired: November 5, 2024
Medal record
Representing the United States
Women's artistic gymnastics
Event	1st	2nd	3rd
World Championships	2	2	1
Pan American Games	1	0	0
Pacific Rim Championships	1	0	0
Total	4	2	1
World Championships
Gold medal – first place	2017 Montreal	All-Around
Gold medal – first place	2018 Doha	Team
Silver medal – second place	2017 Montreal	Balance Beam
Silver medal – second place	2018 Doha	Floor Exercise
Bronze medal – third place	2018 Doha	All-Around
Pan American Games
Gold medal – first place	2019 Lima	Team
Pacific Rim Championships
Gold medal – first place	2018 Medellín	Team
Silver medal – second place	2018 Medellín	All-Around
FIG World Cup
Event	1st	2nd	3rd
All-Around World Cup	3	0	1

Morgan Elizabeth Hurd (born July 18, 2001) is an American photographer and former artistic gymnast. She was a five-time member of the United States women's national team (2016–21). She is the 2017 World all-around champion and balance beam silver medalist and the 2018 World all-around bronze medalist and floor exercise silver medalist. She has won four medals at the USA Gymnastics National Championships during her senior career and is a two-time American Cup champion. She was a member of the gold-medal winning American teams at the 2018 World Championships and the 2019 Pan American Games.

== Personal life ==
Hurd was adopted from Wuzhou, China when she was 11 months old. At age 3, she was enrolled in gymnastics. Hurd started training at First State Gymnastics when she was in fifth grade. She lived in Middletown, Delaware with her mother, Sherri. She is one of the rare elite gymnasts to wear glasses during competition. In 2023, Hurd came out as queer.

== Gymnastics career ==
=== 2014–2016 ===
Hurd competed in the Nastia Liukin Cup in 2014, where she placed fourteenth as a level 10 gymnast. Later that year qualified to compete at the junior elite level. At her first elite level competition, the American Classic, she tied for eighth place. Later that summer she competed at the 2014 U.S. Classic and placed eighteenth. At her first National Championships she finished twenty-ninth in the all-around in the junior division.

Hurd started the 2015 season competing at the U.S. Classic where she finished ninth in the all-around and second on uneven bars. She competed at the U.S. National Championships where she placed eighth in the all-around, seventh on floor exercise, and tied for fourth on the uneven bars.

In 2016, her final year at the junior level, Hurd competed at the American Classic where she finished first in the all-around. She next competed at the 2016 U.S. Classic where she placed fifth in the all-around, first on floor exericse, and second on the uneven bars. She competed at the 2016 National Championships and placed fifth in the all-around, third on uneven bars, and seventh on vault; these results qualified her to the junior national team.

=== 2017 ===
Hurd became age eligible for senior level competition in 2017. She made her international debut at the 2017 Stuttgart World Cup, where she finished third in the all-around behind Tabea Alt of Germany and Angelina Melnikova of Russia. In April, Hurd competed at the City of Jesolo Trophy and helped the United States finish first. In July, Hurd competed at the U.S. Classic where she placed sixth on balance beam and second on floor exercise behind Jade Carey. In August she competed at the P&G National Championships where she placed sixth in the all-around, eighth on uneven bars, fifth on balance beam, and tenth on floor exercise. Since she finished in the top six in the all-around she was named to the national team.

In September Hurd was selected to represent the United States at the 2017 World Artistic Gymnastics Championships in Montreal alongside Ragan Smith, Jade Carey, and Ashton Locklear. At the World Championships Hurd started out on the vault in qualifications, receiving a 14.466. On her next event, the uneven bars, she scored 14.333. On the balance beam she scored 13.500 after upgrading to a full-twisting double tuck dismount, qualifying second into the balance beam finals. She ended qualifications on floor exercise but fell on her double full for a score of 12.533. Her total all around score was 54.832 which qualified her into the all-around final in sixth place. In the all-around final Hurd won a surprise victory with a total score of 55.232, 0.1 ahead of silver medalist Ellie Black of Canada and 0.4 ahead of bronze medalist Elena Eremina of Russia. Two days later in the balance beam final, she matched her ranking from qualifications and won the silver medal, behind Pauline Schäfer of Germany.

=== 2018 ===
On December 11, 2017, Hurd was selected to represent the United States at the 2018 American Cup. She competed alongside first-year senior Maile O'Keefe and finished first overall with a score of 56.599. On April 8, Hurd was named to the team to compete at the 2018 Pacific Rim Gymnastics Championships which included fellow seniors Grace McCallum and Jordan Chiles. There she won team gold and placed second in the all-around behind McCallum after a mishap on her balance beam dismount. Due to her balance beam accident, she withdrew from the uneven bars and floor exercise event finals as a precaution.

On July 28, Hurd competed at the 2018 U.S. Classic where she finished third in the all-around behind Simone Biles and Riley McCusker, despite falling off the balance beam. She also finished third on uneven bars and floor exercise. In August, Hurd competed at the National Championships where she placed second in the all-around behind Biles, third on uneven bars behind Biles and McCusker, and third on floor exercise behind Biles and Jade Carey. She also placed fourth on balance beam, making her and Biles the only competitors to place in the top four on every event they competed. She was named to the national team for the third year in a row.

In October, Hurd participated in the Worlds Team Selection Camp. During the competition a shaky performance caused her to place fourth in the all-around behind Biles, McCusker, and McCallum, fourth on uneven bars, fifth on vault, sixth on balance beam, and seventh on floor exercise. The following day she was named to the team to compete at the 2018 World Championships alongside Biles, McCusker, Grace McCallum, Kara Eaker, and alternate Ragan Smith. During qualifications, Hurd qualified to the all-around final in second place behind Biles, the floor exercise final in fourth place, and the uneven bars final in fifth place. The United States also qualified to the team final in first place. During the team final, Hurd competed on vault, uneven bars, and floor exercise. She contributed scores of 14.633, 14.433, and 12.966 respectively towards the USA's team total. USA won gold with a score of 171.629, 8.766 points ahead of second place Russia, beating previous margin of victory records set in the open-ended code of points era at the 2014 World Championships (6.693) and the 2016 Olympic Games (8.209).

In the all-around final, Hurd put her hands down on her side aerial cartwheel on beam and was in fourth place entering the final rotation. She recovered with a strong floor exercise performance to win the bronze medal behind Biles and Mai Murakami of Japan. In a very close podium finish, Hurd finished 0.066 points behind Murakami, 0.033 points ahead of fourth-place finisher Nina Derwael of Belgium, and 0.034 points ahead of fifth-place finisher Angelina Melnikova of Russia. During event finals, Hurd placed sixth on uneven bars. She then won the silver medal on floor exercise behind Biles and ahead of 2017 World champion Murakami and 2017 European champion Melnikova. With five world championship medals, Hurd became the seventh-most decorated American female gymnast in world championship history, tied with Kim Zmeskal and Kyla Ross.

On November 5, Hurd made her music video debut, appearing in Shawn Mendes' Youth. In December, Hurd underwent her third elbow surgery to have two chips removed.

=== 2019 ===
In February, USA Gymnastics announced that Hurd was selected to compete at the Tokyo World Cup in April. There she won gold ahead of Ellie Black of Canada and Asuka Teramoto of Japan.

In June, after the conclusion of the American Classic, Hurd was named as one of the eight athletes being considered for the team to compete at the 2019 Pan American Games along with Sloane Blakely, Kara Eaker, Aleah Finnegan, Shilese Jones, Sunisa Lee, Riley McCusker, and Leanne Wong. On July 9 it was announced that Hurd would be featured in a year-long documentary series on the Olympic Channel titled All Around, alongside Angelina Melnikova of Russia and Chen Yile of China, which will follow their journeys and training leading up to the 2020 Summer Olympics in Tokyo.

At the 2019 GK US Classic Hurd finished sixth in the all-around behind Simone Biles, McCusker, Grace McCallum, Eaker, and Wong. She placed first on bars, tied for eighth on balance beam with Sunisa Lee, and placed eleventh on floor exercise. After the competition she was named to the team to compete at the Pan American Games alongside Eaker, Finnegan, McCusker, and Wong.

At the Pan American Games Hurd competed on all four events, contributing counting scores on vault and uneven bars to the United States' gold medal-winning performance in the team final. Despite posting high enough scores to qualify to the all-around and all individual event finals except for vault, she was unable to compete in finals because at least two of her teammates outscored her on each event; a maximum of two gymnasts per country may participate in each event final. On uneven bars Hurd tied Wong's score of 14.250, but Wong qualified for the final because she had a higher execution score.

At the 2019 U.S. National Championships Hurd competed on all four events on the first day of competition, but fell while performing on floor exercise and ended the night in eighth place in the all-around. On the second day of competition she was able to perform cleanly on each apparatus, and finished fourth in the all-around behind Simone Biles, Sunisa Lee, and Grace McCallum. Additionally, she won silver on the uneven bars behind Lee, and placed fifth on balance beam and thirteenth on floor exercise. As a result, she was added to the national team.

In September, Hurd competed at the World team selection camp, and placed ninth with a score of 54.100 after mistakes on both floor exercise and uneven bars. On the second day of competition, Hurd competed on uneven bars and balance beam where she recorded the fourth and third highest scores respectively. Following the two-day camp, Hurd was named as a non-traveling alternate for the Worlds team along with Leanne Wong.

In November, Hurd signed her National Letter of Intent with the Florida Gators, deferring until after the 2021 World Championships and starting in the 2021–22 school year.

=== 2020 ===
In late 2019 Hurd was selected to represent the USA at the American Cup in March 2020 in Milwaukee. She was joined by first year senior Kayla DiCello. Hurd finished in first place ahead of DiCello and Hitomi Hatakeda of Japan, with a score of 55.832 in the all-around; she recorded the highest score on bars, the second-highest score on floor exercise, and the third-highest score on vault and balance beam. She debuted some new skills, such as the Downie on uneven bars, and brought back skills which she had previously stopped performing, most notably her tucked full-in dismount on beam.

In August 2020, she had surgery on both elbows.

=== 2021 ===
Hurd underwent elbow surgery in mid-March. She later announced that she would be joining Simone Biles' upcoming Gold Over America Tour. She returned to competition at the U.S. Classic where she competed downgraded routines on balance beam and floor exercise where she finished eleventh and tenth respectively. Hurd was one of five gymnasts featured on the Peacock docuseries Golden: The Journey of USA's Elite Gymnasts. At the National Championships Hurd once again only competed on balance beam and floor exercise where she finished twenty-sixth and twenty-third respectively. She was not added to the national team nor did she qualify to compete at the upcoming Olympic Trials.

== NCAA ==
Hurd was officially added to the Florida Gators roster in January 2022. Prior to making her debut, Hurd announced that she had undergone surgery on her right knee to repair a torn ACL. She redshirted her freshman year. Hurd made her collegiate debut on January 6, 2023 in a meet against West Virginia, Ball State, and Lindenwood University. Hurd competed on two events – uneven bars (8.750) and balance beam (9.775). Hurd only competed on balance beam and floor exercise throughout the 2023–2024 season. She earned her highest score on floor exercise, a 9.95, in a meet against Kentucky on March 2, 2024.

In September 2024, it was announced that Hurd would no longer be a competing gymnast for the Florida Gators, but instead was shifting towards a creative content role for the team.

== Photography career ==
Hurd's visual media career began when she became the official videographer for the Chinese American Student Association at the University of Florida. In the fall of 2024, Hurd took part in an internship with the University of Florida’s athletics department where she photographed many of Florida's athletic teams at competitions. In the summer of 2025, Hurd began photographing competitions for USA Gymnastics.

== Competitive history ==
Competitive history of Morgan Hurd at the junior level
Year	Event	Team	AA	VT	UB	BB	FX
2014	Nastia Liukin Cup		14	14	12	15	10
2014	American Classic		8	14	13	13	13
2014	U.S. Classic		18	29	31	15	13
2014	P&G Championships		29	24	23	24	28
2015	Buckeye Elite Qualifier		4	13	8	1st place, gold medalist(s)	11
2015	WOGA Classic		7	8	7	1st place, gold medalist(s)	7
2015	American Classic		3rd place, bronze medalist(s)	21	1st place, gold medalist(s)	1st place, gold medalist(s)	5
2015	U.S. Classic		9	26	2nd place, silver medalist(s)	9	17
2015	P&G National Championships		8	19	4	13	7
2016	American Classic		1st place, gold medalist(s)	4	2nd place, silver medalist(s)	5	4
2016	U.S. Classic		5	9	2nd place, silver medalist(s)	26	1st place, gold medalist(s)
2016	P&G National Championships		5	7	3rd place, bronze medalist(s)	16	9

Competitive history of Morgan Hurd at the senior level
Year	Event	Team	AA	VT	UB	BB	FX
2017	Stuttgart World Cup		3rd place, bronze medalist(s)				
2017	City of Jesolo Trophy	1st place, gold medalist(s)	10				
2017	U.S. Classic					6	2nd place, silver medalist(s)
2017	P&G National Championships		6		8	5	10
2017	World Championships		1st place, gold medalist(s)			2nd place, silver medalist(s)	
2018	American Cup		1st place, gold medalist(s)				
2018	Pacific Rim Championships	1st place, gold medalist(s)	2nd place, silver medalist(s)		WD		WD
2018	U.S. Classic		3rd place, bronze medalist(s)		3rd place, bronze medalist(s)	7	3rd place, bronze medalist(s)
2018	U.S. National Championships		2nd place, silver medalist(s)		3rd place, bronze medalist(s)	4	3rd place, bronze medalist(s)
2018	Worlds Team Selection Camp		4	5	4	6	7
2018	World Championships	1st place, gold medalist(s)	3rd place, bronze medalist(s)		6		2nd place, silver medalist(s)
2019	Tokyo World Cup		1st place, gold medalist(s)				
2019	U.S. Classic		6		1st place, gold medalist(s)	8	11
2019	Pan American Games	1st place, gold medalist(s)					
2019	U.S. National Championships		4		2nd place, silver medalist(s)	5	13
2019	Worlds Team Selection Camp		9	7	12	7	10
2020	American Cup		1st place, gold medalist(s)				
2021	U.S. Classic					11	10
2021	U.S. National Championships					26	23

== Floor music ==
Year	Music Title
2017	Earth Song
2018	Music World

== Filmography ==
=== Streaming ===
Year	Title	Role	Notes
2019–21	All Around	Herself	Olympic Channel docuseries
2020	Defying Gravity: The Untold Story of Women's Gymnastics	Herself	YouTube docuseries
2021	Golden: The Journey of USA's Elite Gymnasts	Herself	Peacock docuseries

=== Music videos ===
Year	Title	Artist(s)	Role	Ref.
2018	"Youth"	Shawn Mendes featuring Khalid	Herself (cameo)	
