= Kailin Chio =

American artistic gymnast (born 2006)

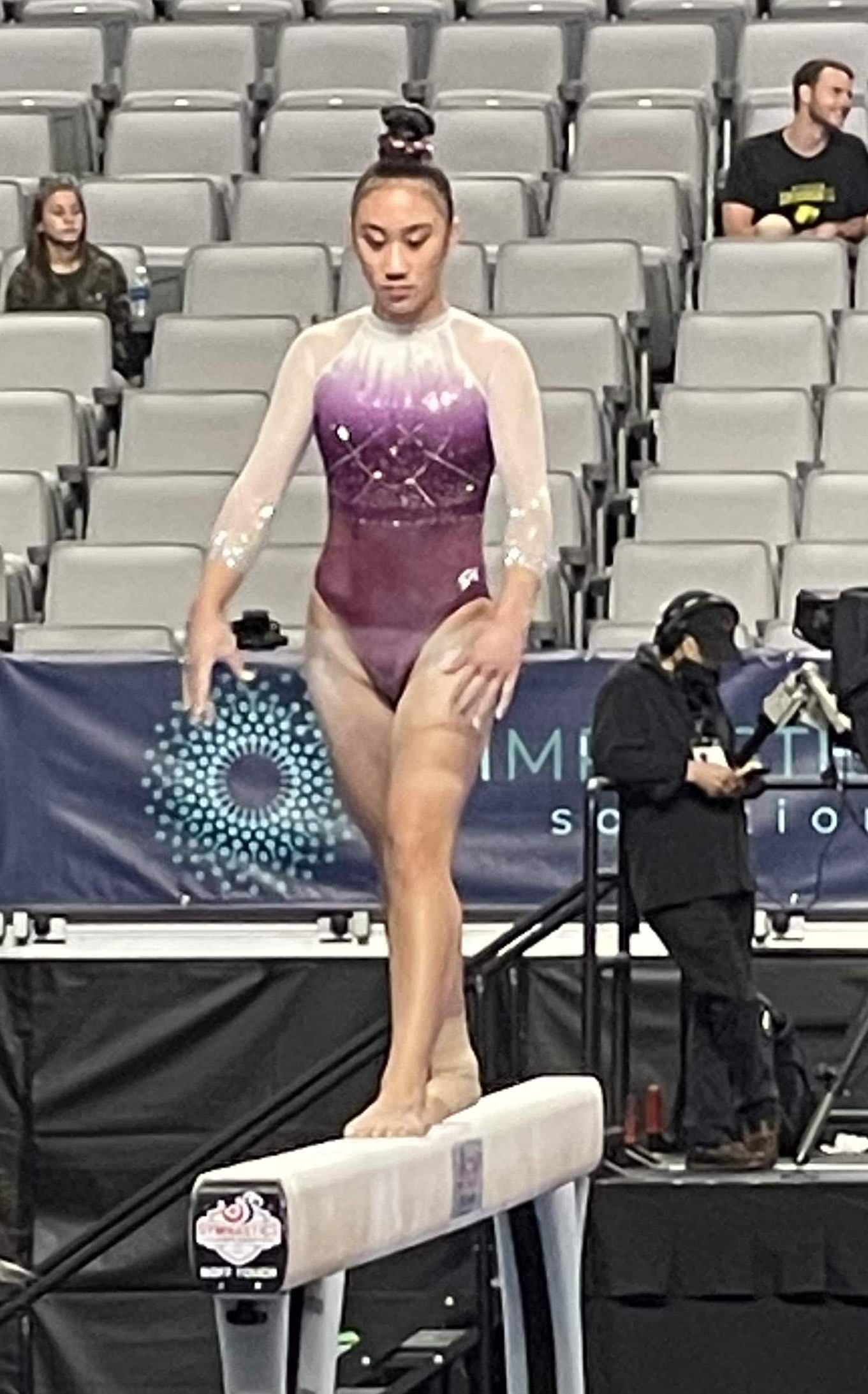
- Chio at the 2021 National Championships

Personal information
- Full name: Kailin Chio
- Nickname: KK
- Born: July 4, 2006 (age 20) Henderson, Nevada USA
- Height: 5 ft 2 in (157 cm)

Gymnastics career
- Discipline: Women's artistic gymnastics
- Country represented: United States; (2021–2022)
- College team: LSU Tigers (2025–2028)
- Club: GymCats
- Head coach: Jay Clark
- Former coach: Cassie Rice
Medal record
Representing the United States
Junior Pan American Games
Gold medal – first place	2021 Cali	Team
Gold medal – first place	2021 Cali	Floor exercise
Silver medal – second place	2021 Cali	All-around
Bronze medal – third place	2021 Cali	Uneven bars
Representing Louisiana State Tigers
NCAA Championships
Gold medal – first place	2025 Fort Worth	Vault
Silver medal – second place	2026 Fort Worth	Team
Silver medal – second place	2026 Fort Worth	All-around
Silver medal – second place	2026 Fort Worth	Vault
Silver medal – second place	2026 Fort Worth	Floor exercise

Kailin Chio (born July 4, 2006) is an American artistic gymnast and former member of the USA national gymnastics team. She is the 2021 Junior Pan American Games champion on floor exercise and the 2025 NCAA champion on vault.

== Early life ==
Chio was born to Sara and Nathan Chio in 2006 in Henderson, Nevada. She started gymnastics in 2009.

== Gymnastics career ==
=== Junior elite ===
Chio competed at the 2021 American Classic where she finished first in the all-around in the junior division. In late May she competed at the U.S. Classic where she placed second in the all-around behind Katelyn Jong. In June Chio competed at the 2021 U.S. National Championships. She ended the two day competition fifth in the all-around. She won gold on vault and bronze on floor exercise. As a result, Chio was added to the national team for the first time. Additionally she was selected to represent the United States at the Junior Pan American Championships alongside Jong, Madray Johnson, and Kaliya Lincoln.

At the 2021 Junior Pan American Championships Chio helped the USA finish first in the team final. Individually she won silver on the floor exercise behind compatriot Lincoln. In November of that year Chio was selected to represent the United States at the inaugural Junior Pan American Games alongside Katelyn Jong, Madray Johnson, and Tiana Sumanasekera. While there the United States placed first as a team and individually Chio won gold on floor exercise, silver in the all-around behind Jong, and bronze on uneven bars behind Johnson and Aurélie Tran of Canada.

Chio became age-eligible for senior competition in 2022. However, she did not compete during the season due to injury.

On January 9, 2023, Chio announced on her Instagram that she had retired from elite level gymnastics and would be competing Level 10.

=== NCAA ===
In October 2022, she verbally committed to compete for the LSU Tigers gymnastics team starting in the 2024–25 season. In November 2023, Chio signed her National Letter of Intent with the LSU Tigers.

==== 2025 ====
Chio made her collegiate debut on January 3, 2025 in a meet against the Iowa State Cyclones. She competed on all four events, earning an all-around score of 39.575 to help LSU win. As a result she was named SEC Freshman of the Week. On March 14, 2025 Chio earned her first collegiate perfect ten on vault in a meet at Auburn University. At the end of the regular season Chio was named 2025 SEC Freshman of the Year. For her freshman season performance she took home All-America honors on every event and the all-around, the most of any LSU gymnast in their debut season. Uneven bars was the only event where she earned Second Team honors.

At the 2025 NCAA Championships Chio scored a 9.975 on vault to win the national vault title outright. She placed sixth in the all-around. She earned 2 postseason First Team All-America honors in vault and in the all-around.

==== 2026 ====
In the regular season finale versus No. 8 Arkansas, Chio competed only on three events and earned a perfect 30.000, scoring perfect 10s on vault, beam, and floor, breaking the record at LSU for most perfect 10s in a season - nine. She was named the SEC Specialist of the Week on March 17, her first honor as a specialist.

At the SEC Championship, Chio took home the vault and all-around title with a 9.975 and 39.775, respectively. In the anchor spot on balance beam she stuck a 9.950, placing second. But, it wasn't enough as LSU finished in third, behind Florida and Oklahoma.

Chio was named the SEC Gymnast of the Year for her standout sophomore season, including 33 event titles and ranking as the No. 1 gymnast in the NCAA for four consecutive weeks. She also earned All-SEC honors, recording a top four score on each event, including the all-around, during the 2026 SEC Gymnastics Championships.

==== NCAA Regular season ranking ====
Season	All-Around	Vault	Uneven Bars	Balance Beam	Floor Exercise
2025	5th	2nd	16th	6th	11th
2026	1st	1st	20th	1st	5th

==== Career perfect 10.0 ====
Season	Date	Event	Meet
2025	March 14, 2025	Vault	LSU @ Auburn
2026	January 23, 2026	Balance beam	LSU vs Kentucky
2026	February 13, 2026	Floor exercise	LSU vs Auburn
2026	February 20, 2026	Vault	LSU @ Oklahoma
2026	February 20, 2026	Balance beam	LSU @ Oklahoma
2026	February 27, 2026	Balance beam	LSU vs Alabama
2026	March 1, 2026	Balance beam	Alabama/Arizona/North Carolina
2026	March 13, 2026	Vault	LSU vs Arkansas
2026	March 13, 2026	Balance beam	LSU vs Arkansas
2026	March 13, 2026	Floor exercise	LSU vs Arkansas
2026	April 2, 2026	Vault	Baton Rouge Regional
2026	April 2, 2026	Floor exercise	Baton Rouge Regional
2026	April 4, 2026	Vault	Baton Rouge Super Regional
2026	April 18, 2026	Vault	NCAA National Championship

== Competitive history ==
Competitive history of Kailin Chio
Year	Event	Team	AA	VT	UB	BB	FX
Junior
2021	American Classic		1st place, gold medalist(s)	1st place, gold medalist(s)	1st place, gold medalist(s)	2nd place, silver medalist(s)	4
2021	U.S. Classic		2nd place, silver medalist(s)	4	3rd place, bronze medalist(s)	13	6
2021	U.S. National Championships		5	1st place, gold medalist(s)	11	5	3rd place, bronze medalist(s)
2021	Pan American Championships	1st place, gold medalist(s)					2nd place, silver medalist(s)
2021	Junior Pan American Games	1st place, gold medalist(s)	2nd place, silver medalist(s)		3rd place, bronze medalist(s)		1st place, gold medalist(s)
2023	Nastia Liukin Cup		1st place, gold medalist(s)				
2023	Level 10 National Championships		3rd place, bronze medalist(s)	1st place, gold medalist(s)	1st place, gold medalist(s)	6	8
NCAA
2025	SEC Championships	1st place, gold medalist(s)	4	6	5	14	2nd place, silver medalist(s)
2025	NCAA Championships	5	6	1st place, gold medalist(s)	39	20	21
2026	SEC Championships	3rd place, bronze medalist(s)	1st place, gold medalist(s)	1st place, gold medalist(s)	4	2nd place, silver medalist(s)	7
2026	NCAA Championships	2nd place, silver medalist(s)	2nd place, silver medalist(s)	2nd place, silver medalist(s)	40	17	2nd place, silver medalist(s)
