= Myli Lew =

American artistic gymnast

- Full name: Myli Lew
- Born: February 12, 2007 (age 19)

Gymnastics career
- Discipline: Women's artistic gymnastics
- Country represented: United States; (2024–present)
- College team: Michigan Wolverines (2026–present)
- Club: San Mateo Gymnastics
- Head coach: Maile'ana Kanewa-Hermelyn

Myli Lew (born February 12, 2007) is an American artistic gymnast. She is the 2022 Junior U.S. National Champion on balance beam.

== Early life ==
Lew began gymnastics at age four and began training at San Mateo Gymnastics in 2011. She attended Bridgeway Academy.

== Gymnastics career ==
=== Junior ===
==== 2022 ====
In February, Lew competed at the Winter Cup where she placed third on balance beam, fourth in the all-around, and seventh on floor. As a result, she was selected to compete at the DTB Pokal Team Challenge. While there, she helped the USA win gold.

In April, Lew competed at the City of Jesolo Trophy alongside Madray Johnson, Ella Murphy, Zoey Molomo, Gabby Van Frayen, and Tiana Sumanasekera. They won the team event and Lew won an additional two bronze medals in the all-around and uneven bars.

In August, Lew competed at the National Championships where she tied for first on balance beam with Madray Johnson, Jayla Hang, and Audrey Snyder.

=== Senior ===
==== 2023 ====
In February, Lew competed at the Winter Cup where she placed third on uneven bars.

In July, Lew competed at the American Classic where she won in the All-Around and uneven bars. The next month, she competed at the National Championships.

On October 14, Lew verbally committed to the University of Michigan on a full athletic scholarship.

==== 2024 ====
In February 2024, Lew competed at the Winter Cup. She also competed at the American Classic, where she won uneven bars. She also earned two silver medals in All-Around and floor exercise, and finished third on balance beam. Lew qualified to compete at National Championships, but later withdrew.

==== 2025 ====
In July, Lew competed at the American Classic, where she finished second on balance beam and finished third in All-Around and uneven bars. She then competed at the U.S. Classic where she won uneven bars with a 14.050. Lew was the only senior to score above a 14 on any event throughout the competition.

=== NCAA ===
==== 2025–2026 season ====
Lew made her collegiate debut on uneven bars at the Sprouts Collegiate Quad on January 10. Lew earned a spot in the uneven bars lineup and scored a season best of 9.875 on three occasions.

Lew stepped into the vault lineup at Minnesota on January 17.

==== Regular season ranking ====
Season	All-around	Vault	Uneven bars	Balance beam	Floor exercise
2026	N/A	N/A	95th	N/A	N/A

== Competitive history ==
Competitive history of Myli Lew at the junior level
Year	Event	Team	AA	VT	UB	BB	FX
2022	Junior Winter Cup		4		3rd place, bronze medalist(s)		7
2022	DTB Pokal Team Challenge	1st place, gold medalist(s)					
2022	City of Jesolo Trophy	1st place, gold medalist(s)	3rd place, bronze medalist(s)		3rd place, bronze medalist(s)		
2022	Junior U.S. National Championships					1st place, gold medalist(s)	

Competitive history of Myli Lew at the senior level
Year	Event	Team	AA	VT	UB	BB	FX
2023	Winter Cup				3rd place, bronze medalist(s)		
2023	American Classic		1st place, gold medalist(s)		1st place, gold medalist(s)	7	10
2023	U.S. National Championships		21		12	15	24
2024	Winter Cup		23		28	26	22
2024	American Classic		2nd place, silver medalist(s)		1st place, gold medalist(s)	3rd place, bronze medalist(s)	2nd place, silver medalist(s)
2025	American Classic		3rd place, bronze medalist(s)		3rd place, bronze medalist(s)	2nd place, silver medalist(s)	8
2025	U.S. Classic				1st place, gold medalist(s)		
