= Katelyn Jong =

American artistic gymnast (born 2006)

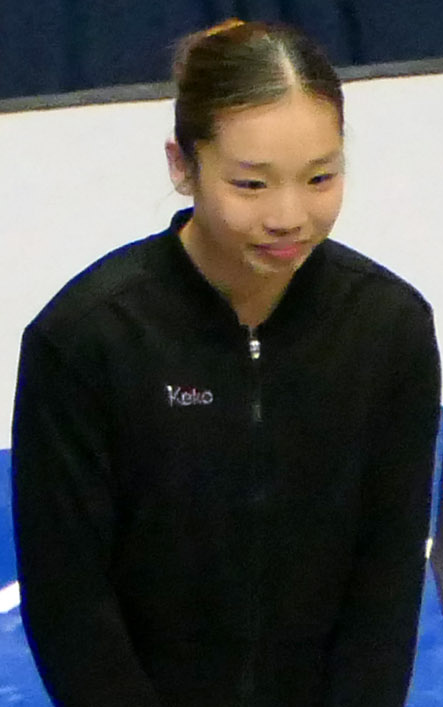
- Jong in 2024

Personal information
- Full name: Katelyn Jong
- Nickname: Keko
- Born: July 28, 2006 (age 20) Allen, Texas USA

Gymnastics career
- Discipline: Women's artistic gymnastics
- Country represented: United States; (2020–2024)
- College team: Auburn Tigers
- Club: Metroplex Gymnastics
- Head coach: Marnie Futch
Medal record
Representing the United States
Event	1st	2nd	3rd
Apparatus World Cup	0	0	1
World Challenge Cup	1	0	0
Total	1	0	1

Katelyn Jong (born July 28, 2006) is an American artistic gymnast. She is the 2021 U.S. Junior National Champion.

== Early life ==
Jong was born to Simon and Yoomin Jong in 2006 in Allen, Texas. She started gymnastics in 2010.

== Junior gymnastics career ==
=== HOPEs ===
In 2018 Jong was part of the USA Gymnastics HOPEs program. She competed at the Buckeye National Qualifier and the KPAC National Qualifier. At the latter she earned her qualifying score to compete at the Hopes Classic. Jong finished 26th at the Hopes Classic.

In 2019 Jong re-qualified as a Hopes gymnast at the World Champion's National Qualifier. At the HOPEs Classic Jong co-won the all-around title alongside Michelle Pineda and Paityn Walker. Additionally she won the uneven bars title and placed fifth on vault, twelfth on balance beam, and fourteenth on floor exercise. Jong next competed at the HOPEs Championships where she placed third in the all-around. She won gold on the uneven bars, bronze on vault, and place sixth and eighth on balance beam and floor exercise respectively.

=== Junior elite ===
Jong qualified as a junior elite in early 2020. In March Jong was selected to compete at International Gymnix, taking place in Montreal alongside Skye Blakely, Kaliya Lincoln, and Konnor McClain. As a result, she was added to the junior national team for the first time. While there she helped the USA win team gold.

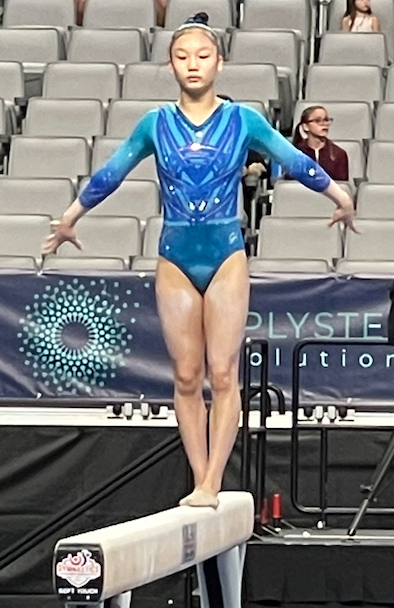
Jong competing on beam at the 2021 U.S. National Championships

Jong competed at the 2021 WOGA Classic in February where she placed first. She next competed at the 2021 Winter Cup where she placed eighth in the all-around after falling off the balance beam. She placed first on vault. At a National Team camp Jong was added to the national team for the second time. Jong next competed at the American Classic where she only competed on the uneven bars and balance beam. She finished second on uneven bars behind Kailin Chio and first on balance beam.

In late May Jong competed at the 2021 U.S. Classic where she placed first in the all-around and on vault, uneven bars, and balance beam. She finished second on floor exercise behind Kaliya Lincoln. In June Jong competed at her first National Championships. She ended the two day competition first in the all-around with a combined score of 107.400, over three points ahead of second-place finisher Madray Johnson. Additionally she won gold on the uneven bars, silver on floor exercise behind Lincoln, bronze on vault behind Chio and Joscelyn Roberson, and placed eighth on balance beam. As a result, Jong was added to the national team for the third time. Additionally Jong was selected to represent the United States at the Junior Pan American Championships alongside Johnson, Lincoln, and Chio.

At the 2021 Junior Pan American Championships Jong helped the USA finish first in the team final. Individually she won gold in the all-around, on vault (tied with compatriot Lincoln), and on uneven bars. She won silver on balance beam behind Johnson.

In November Jong was selected to represent the United States at the inaugural Junior Pan American Games alongside Kailin Chio, Madray Johnson, and Tiana Sumanasekera. While there the United States placed first as a team and individually Jong won gold in the all-around and silver on vault and balance beam.

== Senior gymnastics career ==
=== 2022 ===
Jong made her senior debut at the 2022 Winter Cup where she placed fifth in the all-around. As a result she was selected to compete at the upcoming DTB Pokal Mixed Cup in Stuttgart. In August Jong competed at the National Championships. She finished ninth in the all-around. In September Jong competed at the Szombathely Challenge World Cup alongside Addison Fatta and Levi Jung-Ruivivar.

In October Jong verbally committed to compete for the Auburn Tigers, starting in the 2024–25 season.

=== 2024 ===
Jong competed at the Baku World Cup where she won bronze on the uneven bars behind Kaylia Nemour and Elisa Iorio.

== Competitive history ==
Year	Event	Team	AA	VT	UB	BB	FX
HOPEs
2018	HOPEs Classic		26				
2019	HOPEs Classic		1st place, gold medalist(s)	5	1st place, gold medalist(s)	12	14
2019	HOPEs Championships		3rd place, bronze medalist(s)	3rd place, bronze medalist(s)	1st place, gold medalist(s)	8	6
Junior
2020	International Gymnix	1st place, gold medalist(s)					
2021	WOGA Classic		1st place, gold medalist(s)				
2021	Winter Cup		8	1st place, gold medalist(s)	8	10	5
2021	American Classic				2nd place, silver medalist(s)	1st place, gold medalist(s)	
2021	U.S. Classic		1st place, gold medalist(s)	1st place, gold medalist(s)	1st place, gold medalist(s)	1st place, gold medalist(s)	2nd place, silver medalist(s)
2021	U.S. National Championships		1st place, gold medalist(s)	3rd place, bronze medalist(s)	1st place, gold medalist(s)	8	2nd place, silver medalist(s)
2021	Pan American Championships	1st place, gold medalist(s)	1st place, gold medalist(s)	1st place, gold medalist(s)	1st place, gold medalist(s)	2nd place, silver medalist(s)	
2021	Junior Pan American Games	1st place, gold medalist(s)	1st place, gold medalist(s)	2nd place, silver medalist(s)		2nd place, silver medalist(s)	
Senior
2022	Winter Cup		5		14	7	5
2022	DTB Pokal Mixed Cup	1st place, gold medalist(s)					
2022	U.S. National Championships		9		17	5	10
2022	Szombathely Challenge Cup				5		1st place, gold medalist(s)
2023	Winter Cup		17		17	26	11
2023	U.S. Classic		5		6	10	8
2023	U.S. National Championships		6		5	24	9
2023	Pan American Games						
2024	Winter Cup		31		3rd place, bronze medalist(s)	32	28
2024	Baku World Cup				3rd place, bronze medalist(s)		
2024	City of Jesolo Trophy	3rd place, bronze medalist(s)	12		5		
2024	U.S. Classic				5	30	
2024	U.S. National Championships		23		6	28	26
