= 2026 SEC Gymnastics Championship =

American collegiate gymnastics competition

- Venue: BOK Center
- Location: Tulsa, Oklahoma
- Dates: March 21, 2026
- Teams: 9
- Winning score: 198.175

Medalists
gold medal	Florida
silver medal	Oklahoma
bronze medal	LSU

The 2026 SEC Gymnastics Championship was held on March 21, 2026, at the neutral site of the BOK Center in Tulsa, Oklahoma.

At the SEC Spring Meeting, the SEC announced that all 9 SEC teams that sponsor gymnastics will participate in the SEC Gymnastics Championship for the first time.

== Seeding ==
The seeding was announced on March 16, 2026, based on final regular-season Team National Qualifying Scores.

Seed	Team	Team NQS
1	Oklahoma	197.963
2	LSU	197.917
3	Florida	197.700
4	Alabama	197.500
5	Georgia	197.385
6	Arkansas	197.192
7	Missouri	197.191
8	Auburn	196.547
9	Kentucky	196.503

== Team Results ==
Session I will feature seeds 5–9 at 2 p.m. CT, and Session II will feature seeds 1–4 at 7 p.m. CT. Both sessions of the championships will air live on SEC Network.

Session 1 (2PM CDT)
Seed	Team	Vault	Uneven bars	Balance beam	Floor	Total
5	Georgia	49.275	49.375	49.375	49.425	197.450
6	Arkansas	49.150	49.125	49.350	49.350	196.975
7	Missouri	49.350	49.275	49.000	49.450	197.075
8	Auburn	49.000	48.975	48.025	49.125	195.300
9	Kentucky	49.275	49.225	49.250	49.175	196.925

Session II (7PM CDT)
Seed	Team	Vault	Uneven bars	Balance beam	Floor	Total
1	Oklahoma	49.325	49.600	49.625	49.600	198.150
2	LSU	49.450	49.475	49.500	49.525	197.950
3	Florida	49.425	49.800	49.525	49.425	198.175
4	Alabama	49.175	49.400	49.475	49.425	197.475

=== Final Results ===
Rank	Team	Vault	Uneven bars	Balance beam	Floor	Totals
1st place, gold medalist(s)	Florida	49.425	49.800	49.525	49.425	198.175
2nd place, silver medalist(s)	Oklahoma	49.325	49.600	49.625	49.600	198.150
3rd place, bronze medalist(s)	LSU	49.450	49.475	49.500	49.525	197.950
4	Alabama	49.475	49.400	49.475	49.425	197.475
5	Georgia	49.275	49.375	49.375	49.425	197.450
6	Missouri	49.350	49.275	49.000	49.450	197.075
7	Arkansas	49.150	49.125	49.350	49.350	196.975
8	Kentucky	49.275	49.225	49.250	49.175	196.925
9	Auburn	49.000	48.975	48.025	49.125	195.300

== Individual results ==
=== Medalists ===
Event	Gold	Silver	Bronze
Individual all-around	Kailin Chio (LSU)	Kayla DiCello (Florida)	Selena Harris-Miranda (Florida)
Vault	Kailin Chio (LSU)	Hannah Horton (Missouri)	Morgan Price (Arkansas)
Uneven bars	Selena Harris-Miranda (Florida)	Kayla DiCello (Florida) Skye Blakely (Florida)	Not awarded
Balance beam	Faith Torrez (Oklahoma)	Kailin Chio (LSU) Kayla DiCello (Florida) Selena Harris-Miranda (Florida) Konnor McClain (LSU) Kylee Kvamme (Alabama) Joscelyn Roberson (Arkansas) Kelise Woolford (Georgia)	Not awarded
Floor	Keira Wells (Oklahoma) Mackenzie Estep (Oklahoma) Kaliya Lincoln (LSU) Gabby Gladieux (Alabama)	Not awarded	Not awarded

=== All-Around ===
Rank	Gymnast	Team	Vault (gymnastics)	Uneven bars	Balance beam	Floor (gymnastics)	Total
1st place, gold medalist(s)	Kailin Chio	LSU	9.975	9.950	9.950	9.900	39.775
2nd place, silver medalist(s)	Kayla DiCello	Florida	9.900	9.975	9.950	9.850	39.725
3rd place, bronze medalist(s)	Selena Harris-Miranda	Florida	9.800	10.000	9.950	9.900	39.650
4	Skye Blakely	Florida	9.900	9.975	9.900	9.850	39.625
5	Addison Fatta	Oklahoma	9.900	9.900	9.875	9.925	39.600
6	Joscelyn Roberson	Arkansas	9.850	9.875	9.950	9.900	39.575
7	eMjae Frazier	Florida	9.850	9.900	9.850	9.900	39.500
8	Gabby Gladieux	Alabama	9.800	9.850	9.875	9.950	39.475
9	Allison Cucci	Arkansas	9.800	9.850	9.900	9.850	39.400
9	Delaynee Rodriguez	Kentucky	9.850	9.850	9.900	9.800	39.400
11	Chloe LaCoursiere	Alabama	9.825	9.875	9.850	9.825	39.375
12	Cecily Rizo	Kentucky	9.900	9.750	9.800	9.825	39.275
13	Hailey Klein	Arkansas	9.750	9.675	9.850	9.825	39.100
14	Julianne Huff	Auburn	9.825	9.775	8.975	9.875	38.450
