= 2021 Junior Pan American Artistic Gymnastics Championships =

International sports competition

Junior Pan American Artistic Gymnastics Championships
- Venue: Polideportivo López Mateos
- Location: Guadalajara, Mexico
- Date: June 18–20, 2021

The 2021 Junior Pan American Artistic Gymnastics Championships was held in Guadalajara, Mexico, June 18–20, 2021.

== Medal summary ==
Event	Gold	Silver	Bronze
Women
Team	United States; Kailin Chio; Madray Johnson; Katelyn Jong; Kaliya Lincoln	Brazil; Gabriela Barbosa; Heloísa Carvalho; Andreza Lima; Gabriela Reis	Argentina; Isabella Ajalla; Nicole Aparicio; Mia Mainardi; Zoe Salgado
All-Around	Katelyn Jong (USA)	Madray Johnson (USA)	Alana Walker (JAM)
Vault	Katelyn Jong (USA) Kaliya Lincoln (USA)	Not awarded	Zoe Salgado (ARG)
Uneven bars	Katelyn Jong (USA)	Madray Johnson (USA)	Mariangela Flores (MEX)
Balance beam	Madray Johnson (USA)	Katelyn Jong (USA)	Gabriela Barbosa (BRA)
Floor exercise	Kaliya Lincoln (USA)	Kailin Chio (USA)	Andreza Lima (BRA)
Men
Team	United States; Arun Chhetri; Ian Lasic-Ellis; Vahe Petrosyan; Fred Richard	Colombia; Ángel Barajas; Jordan Castro; Manuel López; Sergio Vargas	Brazil; Yuri Guimarães; Diogo Paes; João Victor Perdigão; Gustavo Pereira
All-Around	Fred Richard (USA)	Ian Lasic-Ellis (USA)	Ángel Barajas (COL)
Floor exercise	Yuri Guimarães (BRA)	Fred Richard (USA)	Ángel Barajas (COL)
Pommel horse	Ángel Barajas (COL)	Edward Alarcón (PER)	Arum Chhetri (USA)
Rings	Jabiel Polanco (DOM)	Arum Chhetri (USA)	Fred Richard (USA) Ricardo Torres (MEX)
Vault	Fred Richard (USA)	Yuri Guimarães (BRA)	Jabiel Polanco (DOM) Ricardo Torres (MEX)
Parallel bars	Ian Lasic-Ellis (USA)	Manuel López (COL)	Edward Rolin (VEN)
Horizontal bar	Fred Richard (USA)	Diogo Paes (BRA)	Ángel Barajas (COL)

== Medal table ==
Rank	Nation	Gold	Silver	Bronze	Total
1	United States	12	7	2	21
2	Brazil	1	3	3	7
3	Colombia	1	2	3	6
4	Dominican Republic	1	0	1	2
5	Peru	0	1	0	1
6	Mexico	0	0	3	3
7	Argentina	0	0	2	2
8	Jamaica	0	0	1	1
8	Venezuela	0	0	1	1
Totals (9 entries)		15	13	16	44
