= Madray Johnson =

American artistic gymnast

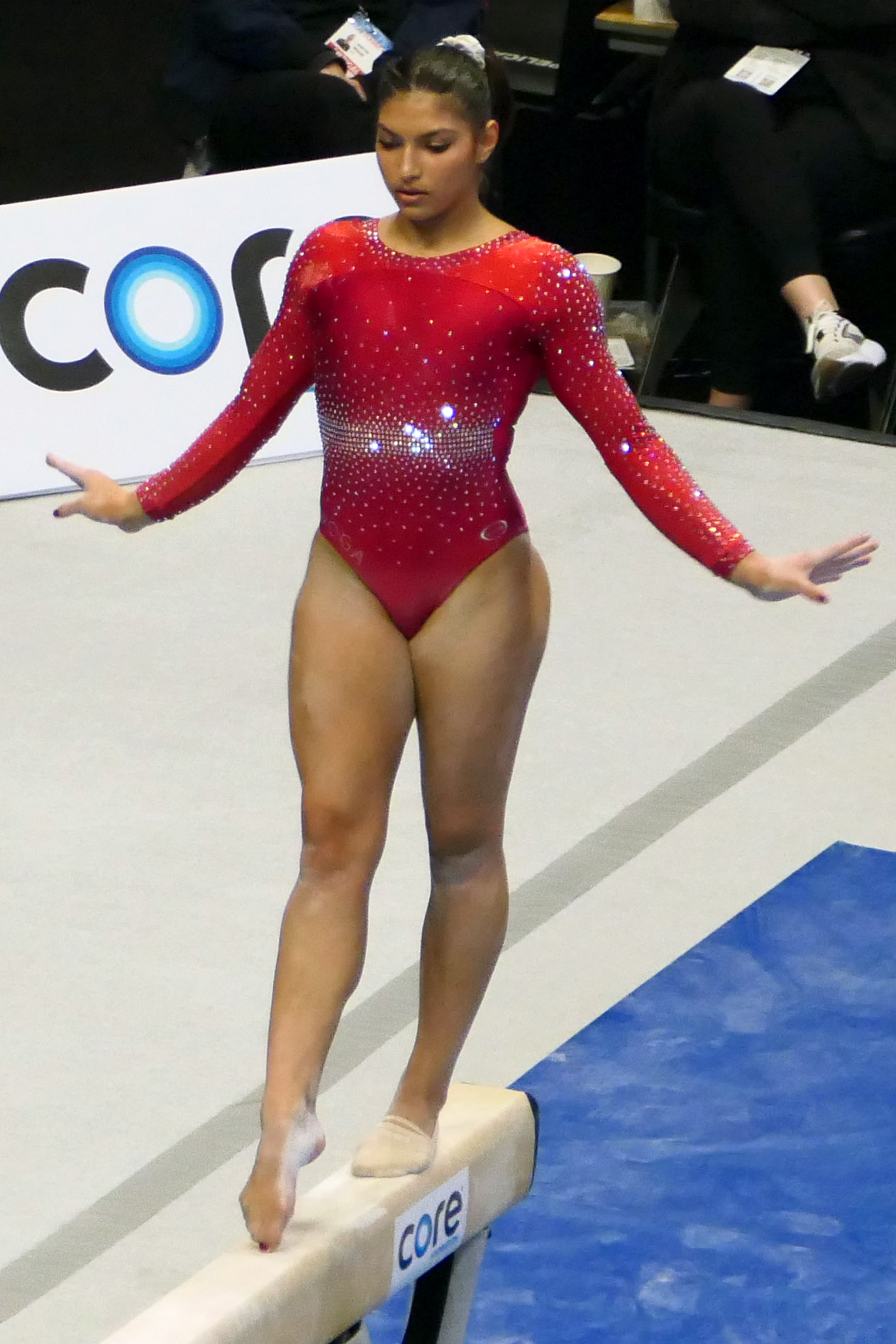
- Johnson competing on beam at the 2024 U.S. Classic

Personal information
- Full name: Madray Emmanuelle Johnson
- Born: July 16, 2007 (age 19) Dallas, Texas USA

Gymnastics career
- Discipline: Women's artistic gymnastics
- Country represented: United States; (2021–2024)
- College team: Oklahoma Sooners (2027–2030)
- Club: World Olympic Gymnastics Academy
Medal record
Women's artistic gymnastics
Representing United States
Pan American Championships
Gold medal – first place	2023 Medellín	Team
Junior Pan American Games
Gold medal – first place	2021 Cali	Team
Gold medal – first place	2021 Cali	Uneven bars
Gold medal – first place	2021 Cali	Balance beam
Pacific Rim Championships
Gold medal – first place	2024 Cali	Team
Silver medal – second place	2024 Cali	All-around

Madray Emmanuelle Johnson (born July 16, 2007) is an American artistic gymnast. She is the 2021 Junior Pan American Games champion on uneven bars and balance beam and is the 2022 U.S. junior national champion.

== Junior gymnastics career ==
=== 2021 ===
In February, Johnson competed at the WOGA Classic where she placed second. She next competed at the 2021 Winter Cup where she placed third in the all-around and third on balance beam. She next competed at the American Classic where she placed third in the all-around and won bronze on uneven bars. She also competed at the 2021 U.S. Classic where she finished seventh on balance beam and seventeenth in the all-around.

In June, she competed at her first National Championships. She ended the two day competition second in the all-around with a combined score of 105.150. Additionally, she won silver on uneven bars and bronze on balance beam, and finished in sixth place on vault and floor. As a result, she was named to the United States women's national team for the first time. She next competed at the 2021 Junior Pan American Championships, where she helped the United States finish first in the team final. Individually she won gold on balance beam, and silver on uneven bars and in the all-around.

In November, she was selected to represent the United States at the inaugural Junior Pan American Games alongside Kailin Chio, Katelyn Jong and Tiana Sumanasekera. While there she helped the United States place first as a team and individually she won gold on uneven bars and balance beam.

=== 2022 ===
In February, Johnson competed at the WOGA Classic where she placed first. She then competed at the 2022 Winter Cup where she finished fourth on vault, and balance beam, and sixth in the all-around.

In April, she competed at the 2022 City of Jesolo Trophy alongside Myli Lew, Ella Murphy, Zoey Molomo, Gabby Van Frayen, and Tiana Sumanasekera. They won the team event and Johnson won silver in the all-around competition. During the event finals she also won an additional two silver medals on uneven bars and balance beam.

== Senior gymnastics career ==
=== 2023 ===
In April she was named to the team to compete at the 2023 Pan American Artistic Gymnastics Championships as the traveling replacement athlete, alongside Tiana Sumanasekera, Zoe Miller, Addison Fatta, Joscelyn Roberson, and Nola Matthews. On May 25, it was announced that Miller suffered a concussion during training and entered concussion protocol, as a result Johnson replaced her. She made her senior debut at the Pan American Championships and finished seventh on beam with a 12.833 and ninth on bars with a 13.133.

=== 2024 ===
In April, Johnson competed at the 2024 Pacific Rim Gymnastics Championships where she won gold in the team event, and silver in the all-around with a score of 52.950.

== Competitive history ==
Year	Event	Team	AA	VT	UB	BB	FX
Junior
2021	WOGA Classic		2nd place, silver medalist(s)	3rd place, bronze medalist(s)	2nd place, silver medalist(s)		
2021	Winter Cup		3rd place, bronze medalist(s)	5	7	3rd place, bronze medalist(s)	8
2021	American Classic		3rd place, bronze medalist(s)	8	6		6
2021	U.S. Classic		17			7	
2021	U.S. National Championships		2nd place, silver medalist(s)	6	2nd place, silver medalist(s)	3rd place, bronze medalist(s)	6
2021	Pan American Championships	1st place, gold medalist(s)	2nd place, silver medalist(s)		2nd place, silver medalist(s)	1st place, gold medalist(s)	
2021	Junior Pan American Games	1st place, gold medalist(s)			1st place, gold medalist(s)	1st place, gold medalist(s)	
2022	WOGA Classic		1st place, gold medalist(s)		1st place, gold medalist(s)	1st place, gold medalist(s)	
2022	Winter Cup		6	4	4		
2022	City of Jesolo Trophy	1st place, gold medalist(s)	2nd place, silver medalist(s)		2nd place, silver medalist(s)	2nd place, silver medalist(s)	
2022	U.S. Classic			2nd place, silver medalist(s)	1st place, gold medalist(s)	18	
2022	U.S. National Championships		1st place, gold medalist(s)	5	2nd place, silver medalist(s)	1st place, gold medalist(s)	3rd place, bronze medalist(s)
Senior
2023
2023	Pan American Championships	1st place, gold medalist(s)			9	7	
2023	U.S. Classic					25	
2023	U.S. National Championships		16		15	8	18
2024	Winter Cup		11		15	5	24
2024	Pacific Rim Championships	1st place, gold medalist(s)	2nd place, silver medalist(s)				
2024	U.S. Classic		14		21	8	19
2024	U.S. National Championships		15		22	5	14
