= World Olympic Gymnastics Academy =

Gymnastics

Coordinates: 33°7′41″N 96°48′5″W

WOGA
- Sport: Gymnastics
- Founded: 1994
- Based in: Frisco, Texas
- Owner: Yevgeny Marchenko, Valeri Liukin
- Website: woga.net

The World Olympic Gymnastics Academy (WOGA) is a two-facility gymnastics club located in Frisco and Plano.

In 1994, WOGA was established by Yevgeny Marchenko, a World Sports acrobatic champion who guided Carly Patterson to her gold medal, and Valeri Liukin, a Soviet Olympic winner from 1988 who later worked as coordinator for the USA Gymnastics women's national team.

Edouard Iarov, a former coach of Liukin and the USSR and Canadian national teams, also trained gymnasts at the club.

In 2003, WOGA gymnasts Patterson and Hollie Vise won two individual medals and contributed to the first team gold for the United States at the World Championships. In 2004, Patterson became the second American gymnast to become the women's Olympic all-around gymnastics champion, and the first American to do so in a non-boycotted Olympics.

WOGA hosts an annual meet at the Comerica Center in Frisco, Texas, which has competitions from level 1 to 10 and an international elite competition that has featured competitors such as Mira Boumejmajen, Marine Brevet, Madeline Gardiner, Laurie Hernandez, Katelyn Ohashi, and Jordyn Wieber.

== Notable gymnasts ==
WOGA is home to four Olympic champions: Carly Patterson (Athens 2004), Nastia Liukin (Beijing 2008), Madison Kocian (Rio 2016), and Hezly Rivera (Paris 2024).

Additionally WOGA is home to eight world champions: Patterson (2003), Hollie Vise (2003), Liukin (2005, 2007), Ivana Hong (2007), Kocian (2014, 2015), Alyssa Baumann (2014), Skye Blakely (2022, 2023), and Claire Pease (2026).

Other notable artistic gymnasts include Irina Alexeeva, Vanessa Atler, Rebecca Bross, Briley Casanova, Madray Johnson, Brenda Magaña, Grace McLaughlin, Konnor McClain, Ohashi, Levi Ruivivar, McKenzie Wofford, and Glenn McCuen. A notable acrobatic gymnasts is Axl Osborne.

== Sexual assaults and alleged abuse ==
=== Sexual assaults ===
In 2003 and 2004, WOGA coach Christopher Wagoner fondled and raped 14-year-old Natasha Crabb. Police launched an investigation in 2005 after Wagoner had left the gym. He pleaded guilty to two counts of sexual assault and was sentenced in 2006 to 15 years in prison.

After Wagoner pled guilty, Crabb and her family sued WOGA's owners, alleging that the gym had failed to properly screen and supervise the coach. The suit did not seek a specific amount of money from the academy owners and did not accuse them of abuse. Bill Boyd, the gym's attorney, said all instructors receive a criminal background check and that the gym was not aware of any accusations until after Wagoner had left. In 2008, WOGA and Crabb settled the lawsuit for an undisclosed amount.

=== Alleged abuse of gymnasts ===
In 2022, the U.S. Center for SafeSport launched an investigation into allegations of abuse of gymnasts by WOGA founder Liukin. "Multiple gymnasts allege Liukin routinely berated, belittled, and screamed at them, that he forced them to compete and train on broken bones or when they were ill, and in some cases they were fat-shamed daily," wrote the Orange County Register, citing a Southern California News Group investigation published in March 2022. Liukin remained under investigation as of January 2023.
