= Margzetta Frazier =

American artistic gymnast (born 2000)

- Full name: Margzetta Bryantina Frazier
- Nickname: Marz
- Born: February 25, 2000 (age 26) Pennsylvania, U.S.
- Height: 5 ft 2 in (157 cm)

Gymnastics career
- Discipline: Women's artistic gymnastics
- Country represented: United States (2017–2018)
- College team: UCLA Bruins (2019–2024)
- Training location: Los Angeles, California, U.S.
- Club: Parkettes (2015–2018)
- Head coach: Janelle McDonald
- Former coaches: Donna and Bill Strauss; Valorie Kondos Field; Chris Waller
Medal record
Representing the United States
FIG World Cup
Silver medal – second place	2018 Birmingham	All-Around
Representing the UCLA Bruins
NCAA Championships
Bronze medal – third place	2019 Fort Worth	Team

Margzetta Bryantina Frazier (born February 25, 2000) is an American artistic gymnast. She was a member of the U.S. national team in 2017 and 2018 and was the 2018 Birmingham World Cup silver medalist. She was a member of the UCLA Gymnastics team. She is the older sister of Emjae Frazier.

== Elite gymnastics career ==
Frazier competed at the 2017 U.S. Classic where she competed on the uneven bars; she finished fourth behind Ragan Smith, Alyona Shchennikova, and Trinity Thomas and tied with Marissa Oakley. Later that summer Frazier competed at the 2017 National Championships where she placed fifth in the all-around and on uneven bars, eighth on balance beam, and seventh on floor exercise. Due to her performance she was named to the national team. In September Frazier attended world trials, but was not named to the world championship team.

In February 2018, Frazier was named to represent the U.S. at the Birmingham World Cup. This would be Frazier's first international assignment. While there Frazier won the silver medal behind Russia's Angelina Melnikova, finishing with a score of 53.932.

Frazier did not plan at competing at the 2018 National Championships, but did so at the request of team coordinator Tom Forster. At the national championships she finished thirteenth in the all-around, tied for eleventh on uneven bars with Ragan Smith, tied for eighteenth on balance beam with Maddie Johnston, and placed tenth on floor exercise.

== Collegiate gymnastics career ==
On November 9, 2015, Frazier committed to the UCLA for the 2018–19 season.

=== 2018–19 season ===
Frazier joined the UCLA Bruins women's gymnastics team in the 2018–19 season. She primarily competed on uneven bars and floor exercise throughout the season. At the Pac-12 Championships Frazier helped UCLA come in first and individually she won silver on the uneven bars. At the NCAA Championships, Frazier helped UCLA finish in third place. Frazier made the NCAA All American team on the uneven bars. Frazier was rewarded with multiple Pac-12 Freshman of the Week titles.

=== 2019–2020 season ===
Frazier made her collegiate all-around and beam debut at the Collegiate Challenge on January 4, scoring a 39.4. This performance led to her selection for the first-ever Pac-12 Coaches' Award.

=== 2020–2021 season ===
Her Janet Jackson-themed floor routine went viral, resulting in the singer calling Frazier. At the Pac-12 Championship, Frazier won the uneven bars title and helped the Bruins to third place in the team competition. Frazier qualified to the NCAA tournament on uneven bars and competed at the Morgantown Regional. During the championships, she scored a 9.8750, finishing 22nd and earned first-team regular season All-America honors on the event.

=== 2021–2022 season ===
During the season opener against the Minnesota Golden Gophers, Frazier fractured her foot competing on the uneven bars, and she redshirted the rest of the season.

=== 2022–2023 season ===
Frazier competed vault, uneven bars, and floor exercise during the 2023 season. UCLA placed second as a team at Pac-12 Championships.

=== 2023–2024 season ===
During her final season, Frazier mainly competed on uneven bars and scored a career high of 9.9500 against the Clemson Tigers. At UCLA's final Pac-12 Championships, she competed on floor exercise and uneven bars, helping the Bruins place second behind the Red Rocks. Frazier was a four-time All American, a four-time All-Pac-12 honoree, and hit 146 out of 147 routines during her collegiate career.

=== Regular season rankings ===
Season	All-Around	Vault	Uneven Bars	Balance Beam	Floor Exercise
2019	N/A	N/A	19th	N/A	34th
2020	N/A	N/A	10th	N/A	N/A
2021	18th	107th	6th	101st	37th
2022	N/A due to injury				
2023	N/A	234th	35th	N/A	47th
2024	N/A	N/A	80th	N/A	N/A

== Personal life ==
Frazier was born on February 25, 2000, to parents, William and Tina Frazier. She has three siblings: eMjae and Billie, who are also gymnasts, and Tytan, a soccer player. Tytan and Billie also do track and field. She attended Timber Creek Regional High School and graduated in 2018.

she is currently dating gymnastics influencer Ian Gunther

== Competitive history ==
Year	Event	Team	AA	VT	UB	BB	FX
Junior
2014	American Classic				4		
2014	P&G National Championships		28	13	28	27	17
2015	P&G National Championships		19	11	18	25	19
Senior
2016	US Classic		4	6	14	17	6
2016	P&G National Championships		15		20	20	15
2017	US Classic				4		
2017	P&G National Championships		5		5	8	7
2018	Birmingham World Cup		2nd place, silver medalist(s)				
2018	U.S. National Championships		13		11	18	10
NCAA
2019	PAC-12 Championships	1st place, gold medalist(s)		17	2nd place, silver medalist(s)		19
2019	NCAA Championships	3rd place, bronze medalist(s)			9		
2020	PAC-12 Championships	Canceled due to the COVID-19 pandemic in the USA					
2020	NCAA Championships	Canceled due to the COVID-19 pandemic in the USA					
2021	PAC-12 Championships	3rd place, bronze medalist(s)	4		1st place, gold medalist(s)		9
2021	NCAA Championships				22		
2023	PAC-12 Championships	2nd place, silver medalist(s)			10		9
2024	PAC-12 Championships	2nd place, silver medalist(s)		19		13	

== Floor music ==
Year	Music Title
2019	"Din Daa Daa" by Kevin Aviance
2021	"Nasty" by Janet Jackson
2024	"Vogue" by Madonna
