= Shilese Jones =

American artistic gymnast (born 2002)

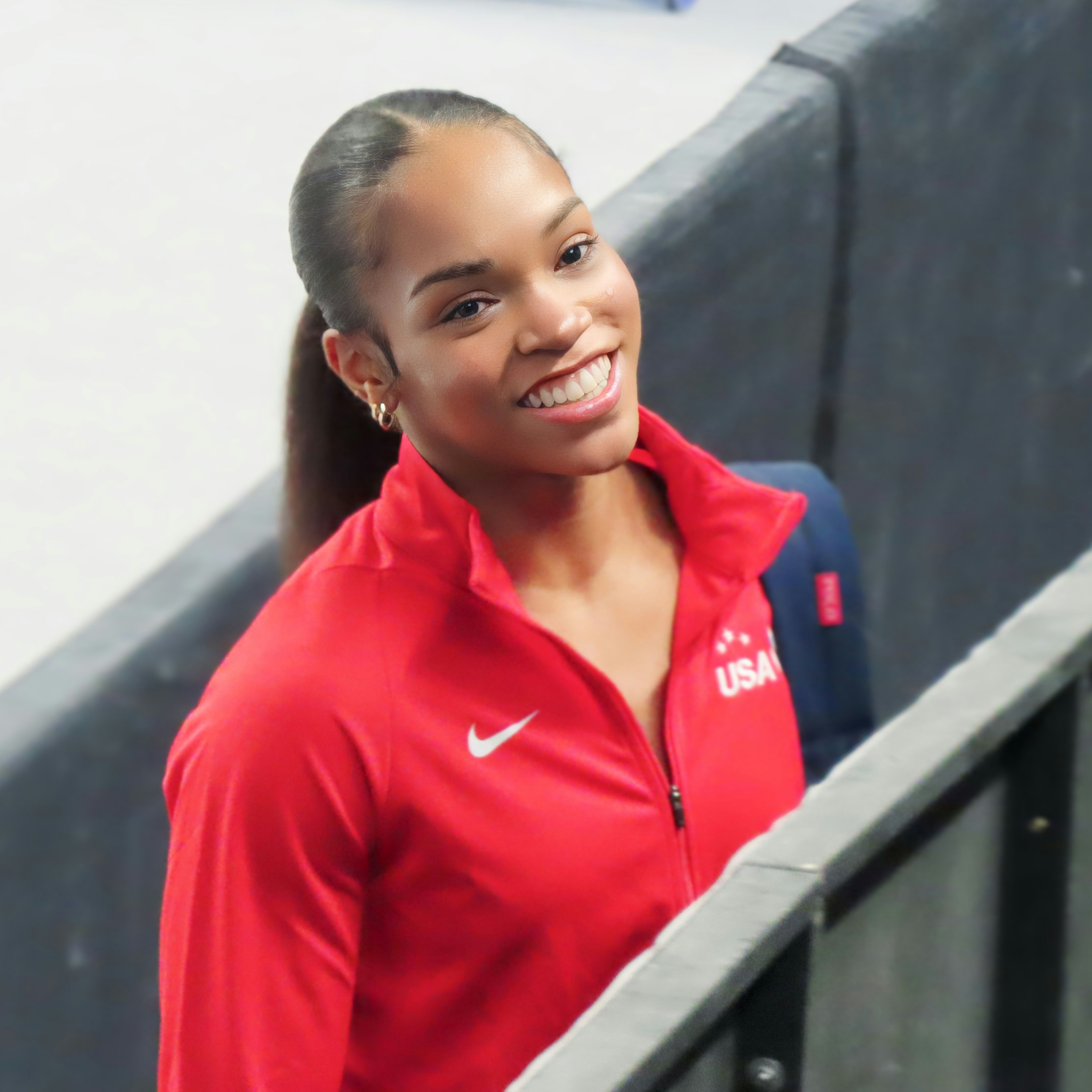
- Jones in 2024

Personal information
- Full name: Shilese Jones
- Nickname: Shi
- Born: July 26, 2002 (age 24) Seattle, Washington, U.S.

Gymnastics career
- Discipline: Women's artistic gymnastics
- Country represented: United States; (2018–2025)
- Gym: Ascend Gymnastics; Buckeye Gymnastics (former)
- Head coach: Sarah Korngold
- Assistant coach: Brett Wargo
- Former coach: Christian Gallardo
Medal record
Women's artistic gymnastics
Representing the United States
World Championships
Gold medal – first place	2022 Liverpool	Team
Gold medal – first place	2023 Antwerp	Team
Silver medal – second place	2022 Liverpool	All-Around
Silver medal – second place	2022 Liverpool	Uneven Bars
Bronze medal – third place	2023 Antwerp	All-Around
Bronze medal – third place	2023 Antwerp	Uneven Bars
Pan American Championships
Gold medal – first place	2018 Lima	Team
FIG World Cup
Event	1st	2nd	3rd
World Challenge Cup	1	1	0
Total	1	1	0

Shilese Jones (born July 26, 2002) is an American artistic gymnast. She was a member of the teams that won gold at the 2022 World Championships, 2023 World Championships, and the 2018 Pan American Championships. Individually she is the 2022 World all-around and uneven bars silver medalist and the 2023 World all-around and uneven bars bronze medalist. Jones is also a two-time U.S. National Champion on uneven bars (2022–2023) and the 2022 U.S. National Champion on floor exercise. She currently trains with Ascend Gymnastics.

== Early life ==
Jones was born in Seattle, Washington to parents Sylvester Jones and Latrice Bryant. She has two sisters. She began gymnastics in 2006. Her father died in 2021 after a prolonged battle with kidney disease.

== Junior gymnastics career ==
=== 2014–15 ===
Jones qualified to junior elite in 2014. She made her elite debut at the American Classic where she finished 29th in the all-around but fourth on vault. She later competed at the U.S. Classic where she placed fourteenth in the all-around, seventh on vault, ninth on floor exercise, and twenty-third on uneven bars and balance beam. At the 2014 National Championships, Jones placed twentieth in the all-around.

In July 2015, Jones competed at the U.S. Classic where she finished sixth in the all-around, on vault, and on floor exercise. The following month she competed at the 2015 National Championships where she placed tenth in the all-around, ninth on vault, fourteenth on uneven bars and floor exercise, and tenth on balance beam.

=== 2016–17 ===
Jones competed at the 2016 U.S. Classic in July where she finished nineteenth in the all-around and seventh on vault. In August, she competed at the 2016 National Championships where she finished seventh in the all-around, but won bronze on vault behind Chae Campbell and Madeleine Johnston and on floor exercise behind Maile O'Keefe and Riley McCusker.

Jones competed at the 2017 U.S. Classic, where she placed seventh in the all-around. She was scheduled to compete at the 2017 National Championships but had to withdraw due to injury.

== Senior gymnastics career ==
=== 2018 ===
Jones turned senior in 2018. She competed at the American Classic where she placed first in the all-around, on vault, and on floor exercise, placed fourth on uneven bars, and twelfth on balance beam. Later in the summer, she competed at the 2018 U.S. Classic where she placed fourth in the all-around behind Simone Biles, Riley McCusker, and Morgan Hurd, sixth on uneven bars, eleventh on balance beam, and fifth on floor exercise.

At the National Championships, Jones finished fifth in the all-around, behind Biles, Hurd, McCusker, and Grace McCallum, sixth on uneven bars, tenth on balance beam, and seventh on floor exercise. As a result of her performance, she was added to the senior national team for the first time. The following day, Jones was named to the team to compete at the Pan American Championships in Lima, Peru alongside McCallum, Trinity Thomas, Jade Carey, and Kara Eaker. In the team competition, Jones helped the United States' win the gold.

In October, Jones participated in the Worlds Team Selection Camp. During the competition, she placed eighth in the all-around, second on vault behind Biles, fifth on uneven bars, ninth on balance beam, and eighth on floor exercise. The following day, she was not named to the team to compete at the 2018 World Championships.

=== 2019 ===
In February, Jones was named to the team to compete at the 2019 City of Jesolo Trophy alongside Sunisa Lee, Emma Malabuyo, and Gabby Perea. While there, she contributed scores on vault, beam, and floor that helped the team win gold.

In June, after the conclusion of the American Classic, Jones was named as one of the eight athletes being considered for the team to compete at the 2019 Pan American Games along with Sloane Blakely, Kara Eaker, Aleah Finnegan, Morgan Hurd, Sunisa Lee, Riley McCusker, and Leanne Wong.

At the 2019 GK US Classic, Jones placed ninth in the all-around. She also placed third on vault behind Jade Carey and Aleah Finnegan, eleventh on uneven bars, fourteenth on balance beam, and tenth on floor exercise. After the competition she was named as the alternate for the Pan American Games.

At the U.S. National Championships, Jones placed twelfth in the all-around. She also finished fifth on vault, fourteenth on uneven bars, eleventh on balance beam, and ninth on floor exercise. She did not retain her spot on the national team, but it was announced that despite neither gymnast making the team, she and Faith Torrez had been extended invites to the worlds selection camp. She later withdrew from the camp due to injury.

=== 2020–21 ===
In March, Jones was selected to compete at the City of Jesolo Trophy alongside Sophia Butler, Leanne Wong, and Kara Eaker. As a result, she was re-added to the national team. However, the USA decided to not send a team to Jesolo due to the COVID-19 pandemic in Italy. In October, it was announced that Jones would compete at a friendly competition in Japan taking place in November. She competed alongside Butler and eMjae Frazier and against gymnasts from Russia, Japan, and China.

In February 2021, Jones competed at the Winter Cup. She finished second in the all-around behind Jordan Chiles. She also finished third on bars behind Sunisa Lee and Riley McCusker, and tied for third on floor with Lilly Lippeatt. In May Jones competed at the 2021 U.S. Classic where she only competed on vault, uneven bars, and balance beam. She recorded the third highest single vault score behind Simone Biles and Chiles and finished 24th and 23rd on the other two apparatuses.

In August, it was announced that Jones would join Biles' Gold Over America Tour.

=== 2022 ===
Jones competed at the 2022 City of Jesolo Trophy alongside eMjae Frazier, Konnor McClain, Zoe Miller, and Elle Mueller. They won the team event with a score of 164.065. Jones placed fourth in the all-around behind McClain, Asia D'Amato, and Martina Maggio. During event finals Jones won silver on uneven bars and bronze on balance beam. In August Jones competed at the National Championships. She finished second in the all-around behind McClain. She co-won the title on the uneven bars alongside Leanne Wong and outright won the national title on floor exercise.

In September, Jones competed at the Paris World Challenge Cup; she only competed on uneven bars, balance beam, and floor exercise. She qualified to all three event finals. During event finals, she won gold on uneven bars ahead of Brazil’s Rebeca Andrade, silver on floor exercise behind teammate Jordan Chiles, and placed fifth on balance beam.

In October, Jones was selected to compete at the 2022 World Championships alongside Skye Blakely, Jade Carey, Jordan Chiles, and Leanne Wong. During the qualification round Jones helped the USA qualify to the team final in first place. Individually she qualified to the all-around and uneven bars finals. Additionally she was the first reserve for the balance beam final. During the team final Jones contributed scores on vault, uneven bars, and floor exercise, helping the USA win their sixth consecutive team gold medal. During the all-around final Jones competed solid routines on all four apparatuses, earning the silver medal behind Rebeca Andrade of Brazil. On the first day of apparatus finals Jones won silver on uneven bars behind reigning World Champion Wei Xiaoyuan.

=== 2023 ===
In September, Jones was selected to represent the United States at the 2023 World Championships alongside Simone Biles, Skye Blakely, Joscelyn Roberson, Leanne Wong, and alternate Kayla DiCello. During qualifications, she helped the USA qualify to the team final in first place and individually she qualified to the all-around, uneven bars, balance beam, and floor exercise event finals. During the team final she competed on all four apparatuses and helped the USA win their seventh consecutive World team title. During the all-around final, Jones performed cleanly on all four apparatuses and won the bronze medal behind Biles and Rebeca Andrade of Brazil. On the first day of apparatus finals, Jones won the bronze on uneven bars behind Qiu Qiyuan of China and Kaylia Nemour of Algeria. On the final day of competition Jones finished seventh on balance beam and fifth on floor exercise.

=== 2024 ===
Jones started the season competing at the Core Hydration Classic where she placed second in the all-around behind Simone Biles. Additionally, she won gold on the uneven bars, silver on floor exercise behind Biles and tied with Kaliya Lincoln, and placed fourth on balance beam. She withdrew from the Xfinity U.S. Championships hours before the competition was set to begin, citing an injury to her right shoulder.

She petitioned to be able to compete at the 2024 Olympic Trials; her petition was accepted. On the first day of competition at the Olympic Trials, while warming up on vault, Jones injured her left knee. She opted to only compete on the uneven bars where she scored 14.675, which was the highest score of the day on the apparatus. The following day, Jones received a medical evaluation which concluded that she would be unable to compete on day two of the competition, thus ending her bid to make the Olympic team. Later in the summer, Jones revealed that she tore her ACL and meniscus. Following on her injury that year, Jones announced that she plans to recover and aim to compete in the 2028 Summer Olympics in Los Angeles, California.

== Competitive history ==
Competitive history of Shilese Jones at the junior level
Year	Event	Team	AA	VT	UB	BB	FX
2014	American Classic		29	4	24	32	27
2014	U.S. Classic		14	7	23	23	9
2014	National Championships		20	12	20	33	14
2015	U.S. Classic		6	6	14	19	6
2015	National Championships		10	9	14	10	14
2016	U.S. Classic		19	7	17	38	18
2016	National Championships		7	3rd place, bronze medalist(s)	14	20	3rd place, bronze medalist(s)
2017	U.S. Classic		7	7	18	16	4

Competitive history of Shilese Jones at the senior level
Year	Event	Team	AA	VT	UB	BB	FX
2018	American Classic		1st place, gold medalist(s)	1st place, gold medalist(s)	4	12	1st place, gold medalist(s)
2018	U.S. Classic		4		6	11	5
2018	U.S. National Championships		5		6	10	7
2018	Pan American Championships	1st place, gold medalist(s)					
2018	Worlds Team Selection Camp		8	2nd place, silver medalist(s)	5	9	8
2019	City of Jesolo Trophy	1st place, gold medalist(s)					
2019	U.S. Classic		9	3rd place, bronze medalist(s)	11	14	10
2019	U.S. National Championships		12	5	14	11	9
2020	Friendship & Solidarity Meet	1st place, gold medalist(s)					
2021	Winter Cup		2nd place, silver medalist(s)	4	3rd place, bronze medalist(s)	13	3rd place, bronze medalist(s)
2021	U.S. Classic				24	23	
2021	U.S. National Championships		12		5	24	18
2021	Olympic Trials		10		14	10	10
2022	City of Jesolo Trophy	1st place, gold medalist(s)	4		2nd place, silver medalist(s)	3rd place, bronze medalist(s)	
2022	U.S. Classic		2nd place, silver medalist(s)		1st place, gold medalist(s)	11	2nd place, silver medalist(s)
2022	U.S. National Championships		2nd place, silver medalist(s)		1st place, gold medalist(s)	11	1st place, gold medalist(s)
2022	Paris Challenge Cup				1st place, gold medalist(s)	5	2nd place, silver medalist(s)
2022	World Championships	1st place, gold medalist(s)	2nd place, silver medalist(s)		2nd place, silver medalist(s)	R1	
2023	U.S. National Championships		2nd place, silver medalist(s)		1st place, gold medalist(s)	4	3rd place, bronze medalist(s)
2023	World Championships	1st place, gold medalist(s)	3rd place, bronze medalist(s)		3rd place, bronze medalist(s)	7	5
2024	U.S. Classic		2nd place, silver medalist(s)		1st place, gold medalist(s)	4	2nd place, silver medalist(s)
2024	Olympic Trials		WD				
