= Alyona Shchennikova =

American artistic gymnast (born 2001)

- Full name: Yelena Aleksandrovna Shchennikova
- Nickname: Alyona
- Born: May 12, 2001 (age 25) Layton, Utah USA

Gymnastics career
- Discipline: Women's artistic gymnastics
- Country represented: United States (2017–2019)
- College team: LSU Tigers (2020–2025)
- Club: 5280 Gymnastics
- Head coach: Alex Shchennikov
- Assistant coach: Katia Shchennikova
Medal record
Representing Louisiana State Tigers
NCAA Championships
Gold medal – first place	2024 Fort Worth	Team

Yelena Aleksandrovna "Alyona" Shchennikova (Russian: Елена Александровна "Алёна" Щенникова, born May 12, 2001) is an American artistic gymnast. She was a member of the U.S. National Team from 2017 to 2019 and was the all-around champion at the 2017 U.S. Classic. She currently competes for Louisiana State in collegiate gymnastics.

== Early life ==
Shchennikova was born in Layton, Utah in 2001 to Russian immigrants. She has two sisters, Polina and Kristina, both of whom are gymnasts.

== Elite gymnastics career ==
=== 2017 ===
Shchennikova turned senior in 2017 and was added to the Senior National Team. She competed at the City of Jesolo Trophy where the USA placed first. She also placed eighth in the All-Around. In July, Shchennikova competed at the U.S. Classic where she placed first in the All-Around and second on Uneven Bars behind Ragan Smith. In August she competed at the National Championships where she placed eighth in the All-Around.

=== 2018 ===
Shchennikova competed at the City of Jesolo Trophy as an individual due to the US not fielding a team. She placed fourth in the uneven bars. In the summer she competed at the American Classic where she placed third on uneven bars. She later competed at the U.S. Classic where she placed fifth in the All-Around and second on uneven bars behind Riley McCusker. In August Shchennikova competed at the National Championships. She placed ninth in the all-around and fifth on the uneven bars behind Simone Biles, McCusker, Morgan Hurd, and Trinity Thomas. She was later named as the alternate to the 2018 Pan American Gymnastics Championships.

In October Shchennikova participated in the Worlds Team Selection Camp. During the competition she placed third on uneven bars behind McCusker and Biles, eighth on balance beam, and ninth in the all-around, on vault, and on floor exercise.

In December Shchennikova competed at the Voronin Cup in Moscow. She placed first in the all-around and on uneven bars and placed second on balance beam behind Maria Kharenkova.

=== 2019 ===
In February Shchennikova was named to the team to compete at the 2019 L'International Gymnix competition in Montreal alongside Sloane Blakely, Kara Eaker, and Aleah Finnegan. While there she helped the USA win team gold. Individually she won silver in the all-around behind Eaker and on uneven bars behind Ana Padurariu of Canada and won bronze on floor exercise behind Azuki Kokufugata of Japan and Haley de Jong of Canada.

In June, while Shchennikova was doing verification for the 2019 Pan American Games, she ruptured her achilles tendon and announced that she would be out for the remainder of the season. In August she officially signed her National Letter of Intent with Louisiana State University and joined their gymnastics team in the 2019–2020 season.

== Collegiate gymnastics career ==
=== 2019–2020 season ===
Shchennikova made her collegiate debut in a meet against Arizona, where she only competed on the uneven bars.

=== 2021–2022 season ===
Shchennikova competed in the opening match against Centenary. Her uneven bars score of 9.950 and all-around score of 39.300 were the highest of the night.

== Competitive history ==
Competitive history of Alyona Shchennikova at the junior level
Year	Event	Team	AA	VT	UB	BB	FX
2013	National Qualifier (HOPEs)		1st place, gold medalist(s)	4	1st place, gold medalist(s)	1st place, gold medalist(s)	1st place, gold medalist(s)
2013	U.S. Challenge (HOPEs)		1st place, gold medalist(s)	3rd place, bronze medalist(s)	1st place, gold medalist(s)		1st place, gold medalist(s)
2014	American Classic		6		7		
2014	U.S. Classic		19	27	21	20	30
2014	U.S. National Championships		24	28	9	30	25
2015	U.S. Classic		20	30	9	21	30
2015	U.S. National Championships		15	26	3rd place, bronze medalist(s)	24	24
2016	American Classic		4				
2016	U.S. Classic		11	10	3rd place, bronze medalist(s)	32	33
2016	U.S. National Championships		17	8	26	12	19

Competitive history of Alyona Shchennikova at the senior level
Year	Event	Team	AA	VT	UB	BB	FX
2017	City of Jesolo Trophy	1st place, gold medalist(s)	8				
2017	U.S. Classic		1st place, gold medalist(s)		2nd place, silver medalist(s)	14	5
2017	U.S. National Championships		8		9	16	9
2018	City of Jesolo Trophy		26		4		
2018	American Classic				3rd place, bronze medalist(s)	12	
2018	U.S. Classic		5		2nd place, silver medalist(s)	7	19
2018	U.S. National Championships		9		5	12	9
2018	Worlds Team Selection Camp		9	9	3rd place, bronze medalist(s)	8	9
2018	Voronin Cup		1st place, gold medalist(s)		1st place, gold medalist(s)	2nd place, silver medalist(s)	4
2019	International Gymnix	1st place, gold medalist(s)	2nd place, silver medalist(s)		2nd place, silver medalist(s)		3rd place, bronze medalist(s)

Competitive history of Alyona Shchennikova at the NCAA level
Year	Event	Team	AA	VT	UB	BB	FX
2020	SEC Championships	Canceled due to the COVID-19 pandemic in the USA					
2020	NCAA Championships	Canceled due to the COVID-19 pandemic in the USA					
2021	SEC Championships	2nd place, silver medalist(s)		7	10		5
2021	NCAA Championships	SF	23		9		
2022	SEC Championships	5		25	11		23
2023	SEC Championships	3rd place, bronze medalist(s)	9	12	24	10	10
2023	NCAA Championships	4	19				
