= 2014 U.S. National Gymnastics Championships =

2014 P&G U.S. National Gymnastics Championships
- Venue: CONSOL Energy Center
- Location: Pittsburgh, Pennsylvania, U.S.
- Date: August 21, 2014—August 24, 2014

The 2014 P&G U.S. National Gymnastics Championships was the 51st edition of the U.S. National Gymnastics Championships. The competition was held from August 21–24, 2014 at the CONSOL Energy Center in Pittsburgh, Pennsylvania.

== Event information ==
The fifty-first edition of the Championships, the competition was held at the CONSOL Energy Center in Pittsburgh, Pennsylvania; the home arena of the Pittsburgh Penguins. It was the first time the U.S. Championships have been held in Pennsylvania since 2001 and just the fourth since 1973. The competition was televised by NBC Sports Network.

=== Competition schedule ===
The competition featured Senior and Junior competitions for both women's and men's disciplines. The competition was as follows;

Thursday, August 21

1:00 pm – Jr. Women's Competition – Day 1
7:45 pm – Sr. Women's Competition – Day 1

Friday, August 22

1:00 pm – Jr. Men's Competition – Day 1
7:15 pm – Sr. Men's Competition – Day 1

Saturday, August 23

1:00 pm – Jr. Women's Competition – Final Day
7:30 pm – Sr. Women's Competition – Final Day

Sunday, August 24

1:30 pm – Sr. Men's Competition – Final Day
7:30 pm – Jr. Men's Competition – Final Day

Note: all times are in Eastern Time Zone.

=== Sponsorship ===
Procter & Gamble, a multinational consumer goods company, was the title sponsor of the event; as part of the a deal the company signed with USA Gymnastics from 2013–16. The competition was also presented by CoverGirl and Gilette. In addition, Vera Bradley, Deloitte, Kroger, OneAmerica, Faegre Baker Daniels and Washington National were all sponsoring the event.

== Medalists ==
Event	Gold	Silver	Bronze
Senior Women
Individual all-around	Simone Biles	Kyla Ross	Maggie Nichols
Vault	Simone Biles	MyKayla Skinner	—N/a
Uneven bars	Ashton Locklear	Madison Kocian	Maggie Nichols
Balance beam	Kyla Ross	Simone Biles Alyssa Baumann	—N/a
Floor	Simone Biles	MyKayla Skinner	Maggie Nichols
Junior Women
Individual all-around	Jazmyn Foberg	Nia Dennis	Norah Flatley
Vault	Nia Dennis	Olivia Trautman	Jordan Chiles
Uneven bars	Jazmyn Foberg	Norah Flatley	Nia Dennis
Balance beam	Alexis Vasquez	Ragan Smith	Lauren Navarro
Floor	Nia Dennis	Ragan Smith	Jordan Chiles Victoria Nguyen
Senior Men
Individual all-around	Sam Mikulak	John Orozco	Jacob Dalton
Floor	Jacob Dalton	Eddie Penev	Paul Ruggeri
Pommel horse	Sam Mikulak	Alex Naddour	Ellis Mannon
Rings	Brandon Wynn	Donnell Whittenburg	C.J. Maestas
Vault	Donnell Whittenburg	Paul Ruggeri	Eddie Penev
Parallel bars	Danell Leyva	Jonathan Horton Jacob Dalton	—N/a
Horizontal bar	John Orozco	Sam Mikulak	Paul Ruggeri

== National team ==
The top 6 placing seniors were automatically named National Team – Simone Biles, Kyla Ross, Maggie Nichols, Alyssa Baumann, MyKayla Skinner, and Amelia Hundley. Additionally Ashton Locklear, Madison Kocian, Brenna Dowell, and Madison Desch were also named to the team. As for juniors Jordan Chiles, Nia Dennis, Norah Flatley, Jazmyn Foberg, Emily Gaskins, Bailie Key, and Alexis Vasquez were all named to the junior national team.

== Participants ==
The following individuals are participating in competition:

=== Senior ===
- Alyssa Baumann
- Simone Biles
- Madison Desch
- Brenna Dowell
- ~~Peyton Ernst~~
- ~~Rachel Gowey~~
- Felicia Hano
- Veronica Hults
- Amelia Hundley
- Madison Kocian
- Ashton Locklear
- Maggie Nichols
- Kyla Ross
- Emily Schild
- MyKayla Skinner
- Macy Toronjo

=== Junior ===
- Ariana Agrapides
- Elena Arenas
- Rachel Baumann
- Aria Brusch
- Jordan Chiles
- Nia Dennis
- Christina Desiderio
- Bailey Ferrer
- Rachael Flam
- Norah Flatley
- Jazmyn Foberg
- Molly Frack
- Margzetta Frazier
- Megan Freed
- Emily Gaskins
- Delanie Harkness
- Morgan Hurd
- Sydney Johnson-Scharpf
- Shilese Jones
- Adeline Kenlin
- ~~Bailie Key~~
- Taylor Lawson
- Maggie Musselman
- Lauren Navarro
- Victoria Nguyen
- Maile O'Keefe
- Marissa Oakley
- Abby Paulson
- Adriana Popp
- Grace Quinn
- Lexy Ramler
- Alyona Shchennikova
- Megan Skaggs
- Ragan Smith
- Deanne Soza
- Olivia Trautman
- Alexis Vasquez
