= Marissa Oakley =

American artistic gymnast

- Born: April 15, 1999 (age 27) Naperville, Illinois

Gymnastics career
- Discipline: Women's artistic gymnastics
- College team: Georgia Gym Dogs
- Club: Phenom
- Head coach: Greg McGarity
Medal record
Representing the United States
National Championships
Bronze medal – third place	2017 Anaheim	Uneven Bars

Marissa Oakley (born April 15, 1999) is an American artistic gymnast.

== Early life ==
Marissa Oakley was born on April 15, 1999, in Naperville, Illinois, to parents, Dan and Jill Oakley. She has two sisters; Angelique and Joslyn. She got into gymnastics because her older sister, Angelique, was in it and Marissa wanted to do it.

She started gymnastics in 2006 at Premier Gymnastics as a level four gymnast. She quickly progressed through the Junior Olympic levels and was a Level 10 in 2010; at ten years old.

== Gymnastics career ==
=== 2010-14: Junior Olympic career ===
Her first J.O. Nationals was in 2011; placing 48th in the Junior A division. She was State champion in 2012 and later placed twenty-seventh at J.O. Nationals. In 2013, her fourth season as a level ten, she won Regionals. At Nationals, she finished fifth in the Junior A division as well as tying for second on bars with Emily Gaskins and Grace Waguespack. In addition, she tied for third with Rachael Lukacs too.

On November 23, 2013, she verbally committed to the University of Georgia and their gymnastics team. Oakley remained a level ten for the 2014 Junior Olympic season and her prowess showed; winning both State and Regional titles. At Nationals, Marissa finished eleventh in the all-around but tied for third on beam with Sophia Carter.

=== 2014-present: International Elite ===
In March, prior to the Level 10 championship season, Oakley participated in one of the National Elite Qualifier events; held in California. She finished third in the all-around with a score of 54.100, which was enough to qualify her to the U.S. Classic.

At 2017 Classics, Oakley finished in fourth on the uneven bars behind Ragan Smith, Alyona Shchennikova, and Trinity Thomas and tied with Margzetta Frazier.

Later that summer, Oakley attended nationals, where she placed third on the uneven bars behind Riley McCusker and Ashton Locklear and tied with Smith.
