= Emma Malabuyo =

Filipino-American artistic gymnast (born 2002)

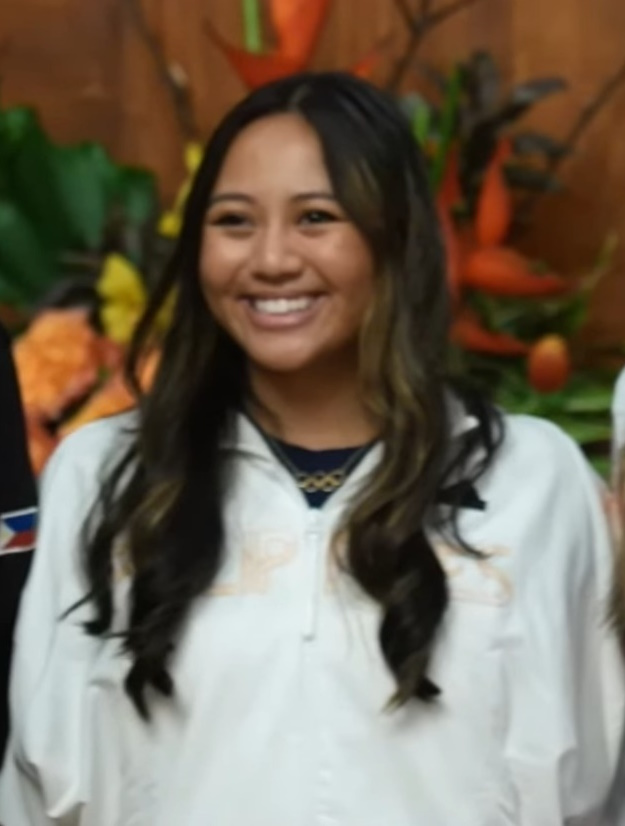
- Malabuyo in 2024

Personal information
- Full name: Emma Lauren Bringas Malabuyo
- Born: Emma Lauren Malabuyo; November 5, 2002 (age 24) Mountain View, California, U.S.
- Height: 5 ft 0 in (152 cm)

Gymnastics career
- Discipline: Women's artistic gymnastics
- Country represented: Philippines; (2023–present)
- Former countries represented: United States (2016–19, 2021)
- College team: UCLA Bruins (2022–25)
- Club: Texas Dreams
- Head coach: Kim Zmeskal-Burdette
- Assistant coach: Chris Burdette
Medal record
Representing Philippines
Asian Championships
Gold medal – first place	2024 Tashkent	Floor exercise
Silver medal – second place	2023 Singapore	Floor exercise
Bronze medal – third place	2024 Tashkent	All-around
FIG World Cup
Event	1st	2nd	3rd
Apparatus World Cup	0	1	0
Total	0	1	0
Representing the UCLA Bruins
NCAA Championships
Silver medal – second place	2025 Fort Worth	Team
Silver medal – second place	2025 Fort Worth	Balance beam

Emma Lauren Bringas Malabuyo (born November 5, 2002) is a Filipino-American artistic gymnast. Born in the United States, she represents the Philippines internationally and competed for her country of birth in the past. She represented the Philippines at the 2024 Summer Olympics. She was a five-time member of the U.S. National Team (2016–19, 2021) and was an alternate for the 2020 Olympic team. She competed for the UCLA Bruins gymnastics team.

== Early life ==
Emma Malabuyo was born in Mountain View, California, to Joel and Ana Malabuyo. While living in Milpitas, she began her training at Airborne Gymnastics in Santa Clara with coach Elisabeth Crandall-Howell.

In 2013, her family moved to Texas, where she trained under former world champion Kim Zmeskal-Burdette and Chris Burdette at Texas Dreams. She qualified as an elite gymnast in 2015.

== Gymnastics career ==
In March 2016, Malabuyo made her international debut as part of the United States' gold-winning junior team at the 2016 L'International Gymnix tournament. She earned the bronze medal in the all-around competition, and two gold medals, on balance beam and floor exercise. Later that month at the City of Jesolo Trophy, she won a gold medal on balance beam and earned three silver medals in the all-around, uneven bars, and floor exercise. In June, Malabuyo competed at the 2016 Secret U.S. Classic, where she finished second in the all-around behind fellow Texan Irina Alexeeva of World Olympic Gymnastics Academy (WOGA) and third on balance beam. She progressed to the 2016 P&G U.S. National Gymnastics Championships, but pulled out after competing in only the vault and floor exercises on the first day, and did not medal.

In April 2017, Malabuyo competed at the City of Jesolo Trophy, where she finished third in the all-around behind teammates Gabby Perea and Maile O'Keefe. Later that year Malabuyo won the U.S. Classic ahead of O'Keefe. At Nationals, Malabuyo finished second behind defending champion O'Keefe, but finished first on floor exercise, second on uneven bars, and third on vault.

She was named to the national team. She and O'Keefe were selected to represent the United States at the 2017 International Junior Gymnastics Competition in Japan. There Malabuyo finished second in the all-around, again behind O'Keefe, and first on floor exercise.

=== 2018 ===
Malabuyo made her senior debut at the City of Jesolo Trophy, where she competed as an individual alongside club teammate Ragan Smith. She won gold in the all-around, balance beam, and floor exercise.

During the summer, Malabuyo competed only on vault and balance beam at the U.S. Classic due to a nagging back injury, scoring 14.300 and 12.650, respectively, after falling on beam. She finished fourteenth on the event. In August, she traveled with Smith to Boston to compete in the national championships, but pulled out of the event during training to avoid re-aggravating her injury. As a result, she was not named to the national team after the meet.

=== 2019 ===
In February, Malabuyo was named to the team to compete at the City of Jesolo Trophy alongside Sunisa Lee, Shilese Jones, and Gabby Perea. As a result, she was added back onto the national team. In Italy she helped the USA win gold in the team final, and individually won bronze in the all-around behind Lee and Liu Tingting of China, and won silver on balance beam behind reigning World Champion Liu and on floor exercise, behind teammate Lee. She also placed sixth on uneven bars. She finished third overall.

In July, Malabuyo was going to compete at the 2019 U.S. Classic but broke her tibia and was out for the remainder of the season.

=== 2021 ===
Malabuyo returned to gymnastics at the 2021 Winter Cup. She competed in three events, including a sixth-place finish on beam. At the National Championships she finished fourth in the all-around. As a result, she was named to the national team and selected to compete at the upcoming Olympic Trials. At the Olympic Trials Malabuyo finished ninth in the all-around and was named as an alternate for the Olympic team.

=== 2023–24 ===
In 2023, it was announced that Malabuyo had decided to represent the Philippines, her grandparents' country, in international competition. She made her debut for them at the 2023 Asian Championships. On the first day of competition, she helped the Philippines finish fifth as a team. During event finals, Malabuyo won silver on floor exercise, the highest ever result for a Filipina gymnast at the Asian Championships at that time, and placed fifth on balance beam.

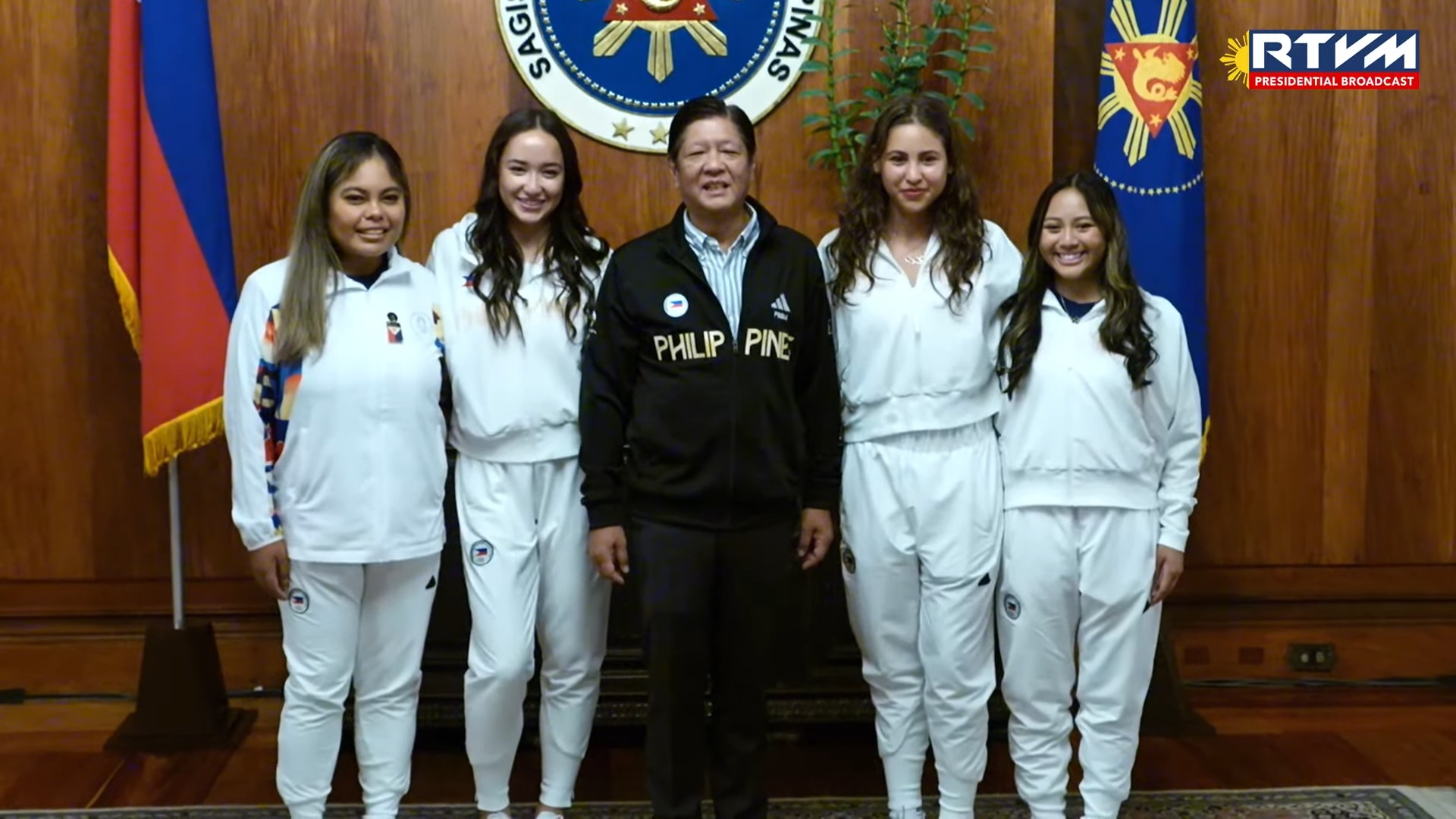
Malabuyo (first from right) meeting President Bongbong Marcos

In early 2024, Malabuyo competed at the Cairo World Cup where she won silver on floor exercise behind Mana Okamura of Japan. She remained on the UCLA gymnastics team and while seeking to qualify to represent the Philippines at the 2024 Summer Olympics in Paris. At the conclusion of the World Cup series, Malabuyo was ranked third on floor exercise and did not qualify via this pathway. In late May, she competed at the Asian Championships where she won bronze in the all-around behind Hu Jiafei and Qin Xinyi, both from China. As the highest ranking gymnast not part of a qualified team or having previously qualified as an individual, Malabuyo earned an Olympic berth to the 2024 Olympic Games in Paris. She also won gold on floor exercise in event finals.

At the 2024 Olympics, she finished 41st in the all-around, placing 60th in uneven bars, 57th in balance beam, and 25th on floor exercise in qualifications. She did not advance to any finals.

=== 2025 ===
In 2025, Malabuyo competed at the World Championships in Jakarta. She competed on the balance beam and floor exercise, finishing 33rd for both apparatuses in qualifications.

== NCAA career ==
Malabuyo committed to University of California, Los Angeles (UCLA) in 2017; in fall 2019 she signed her National Letter of Intent, joining the UCLA Bruins of the NCAA in the 2021–22 school year.

=== 2021–2022 season ===
Malabuyo made her NCAA debut in a meet against the Iowa Hawkeyes and Minnesota Golden Gophers, competing on vault, balance beam, and floor exercise. She scored her first and only perfect 10 on March 12 during a meet against UC Davis. At the Pac-12 Championship, she scored 9.9250 on floor exercise, placing third.

=== 2022–2023 season ===
Malabuyo mainly competed on balance beam and floor exercise during this season. At Pac-12 Championships, she scored 9.9250 on balance beam and 9.9000 on floor exercise, helping UCLA finish second.

=== 2023–2024 season ===
At the final Pac-12 Championship, Malabuyo scored 9.9500 on balance beam and tied with teammate Selena Harris-Miranda and Stanford's Chloe Widner for second place.

=== 2024–2025 season ===
During UCLA's first appearance at the Big Ten Championship, she contributed scores on uneven bars, balance beam, and floor exercise, helping the Bruins win the conference title. Additionally, she placed third on balance beam, tying with teammate Chae Campbell and Nebraska's Sophia McClelland. At the NCAA women's gymnastics tournament, Malabuyo was runner up on balance beam behind Missouri's Helen Hu. During the final, she competed uneven bars, balance beam, and floor exercise, helping UCLA finish second behind the Oklahoma Sooners. She ended her NCAA career as a four-time balance beam All-American and the 2025 Big Ten Sportsmanship award winner.

=== Career perfect 10.0 ===
Season	Date	Event	Meet
2022	March 12, 2022	Balance beam	UCLA vs UC Davis

=== Regular season rankings ===
Season	All-Around	Vault	Uneven Bars	Balance Beam	Floor Exercise
2022	N/A	N/A	174th	25th	152nd
2023	N/A	N/A	N/A	36th	42nd
2024	N/A	N/A	208th	16th	282nd
2025	N/A	N/A	60th	6th	34th

== Selected competitive skills ==
Apparatus	Name	Description	Difficulty (Note: Valid for the 2022-2024 Code of Points)	Performed
Vault	Baitova	Yurchenko entry, laid out salto backwards with two twists	5.0	2018–21
Uneven Bars	Chow 1/2	Stalder Shaposhnikova transition with ½ twist to high bar	E	2018, 2021
Uneven Bars	Double Layout 1/1	Dismount: Full-twisting double laid out salto backwards	E	2018–21
Uneven Bars	Piked Jaeger	Reverse grip swing to piked salto forwards to catch high bar	E	2019–21
Uneven Bars	Inbar 1/1	Inbar Stalder to full (1/1) pirouette	E	2018
Balance Beam	Double Pike	Dismount: Double piked salto backwards	E	2018–21
Balance Beam	Mitchell	1080° (3/1) turn in tuck stand on one leg	E	2018–21
Balance Beam	Switch Ring	Switch Leap to Ring Position (180° split with raised back leg)	E	2018–21
Balance Beam	Arabian	Immediate ½ twist to tucked salto forward	F	2018–21
Floor Exercise	Andreasen	Tucked Arabian double salto forward	E	2019
Floor Exercise	Mukhina	Full-twisting (1/1) double tucked salto backwards	E	2018–21
Floor Exercise	Double Layout	Double laid out salto backwards	F	2018–21
Floor Exercise	Silivas	Double-twisting (2/1) double tucked salto backwards	H	2018

== Competitive history ==
Competitive history of Emma Malabuyo representing the United States at the junior level
Year	Event	Team	AA	VT	UB	BB	FX
2015	Buckeye Elite Qualifier		11	6	18	2nd place, silver medalist(s)	16
2015	WOGA Classic Qualifier		3rd place, bronze medalist(s)	9	9	2nd place, silver medalist(s)	6
2015	American Classic		3rd place, bronze medalist(s)	6	5	7	3rd place, bronze medalist(s)
2015	U.S. Classic		12	21	19	7	7
2015	P&G National Championships		20	19	26	7	9
2016	Gymnix Int'l Junior Cup	1st place, gold medalist(s)	1st place, gold medalist(s)				
2016	City of Jesolo Trophy		2nd place, silver medalist(s)		2nd place, silver medalist(s)	1st place, gold medalist(s)	2nd place, silver medalist(s)
2016	U.S. Classic		2nd place, silver medalist(s)	4		3rd place, bronze medalist(s)	5
2017	City of Jesolo Trophy	1st place, gold medalist(s)	3rd place, bronze medalist(s)	2nd place, silver medalist(s)			1st place, gold medalist(s)
2017	U.S. Classic		1st place, gold medalist(s)	4	6	2nd place, silver medalist(s)	1st place, gold medalist(s)
2017	P&G National Championships		2nd place, silver medalist(s)	3rd place, bronze medalist(s)	2nd place, silver medalist(s)	4	1st place, gold medalist(s)
2017	Junior Japan International		2nd place, silver medalist(s)	3rd place, bronze medalist(s)	3rd place, bronze medalist(s)	2nd place, silver medalist(s)	1st place, gold medalist(s)

Competitive history of Emma Malabuyo representing the United States at the senior level
Year	Event	Team	AA	VT	UB	BB	FX
2018	City of Jesolo Trophy		1st place, gold medalist(s)			1st place, gold medalist(s)	1st place, gold medalist(s)
2018	U.S. Classic					14	
2019	City of Jesolo Trophy	1st place, gold medalist(s)	3rd place, bronze medalist(s)		6	2nd place, silver medalist(s)	2nd place, silver medalist(s)
2021	Winter Cup			18		6	18
2021	U.S. Classic				7	9	
2021	U.S. National Championships		4		7	6	7
2021	Olympic Trials		9		8	9	8

Competitive history of Emma Malabuyo representing the Philippines
Year	Event	Team	AA	VT	UB	BB	FX
2023
2023	Asian Championships	5				5	2nd place, silver medalist(s)
2024	Cairo World Cup						2nd place, silver medalist(s)
2024	Baku World Cup						4
2024	Asian Championships	7	3rd place, bronze medalist(s)				1st place, gold medalist(s)
2024	Olympic Games		41				
2025
2025	World Championships					33	33

Competitive history of Emma Malabuyo representing the UCLA Bruins
Year	Event	Team	AA	VT	UB	BB	FX
2022	Pac-12 Championships	4	11				3rd place, bronze medalist(s)
2023	Pac-12 Championships	2nd place, silver medalist(s)				10	9
2023	NCAA Championships	5					
2024	Pac-12 Championships	2nd place, silver medalist(s)			21	2nd place, silver medalist(s)	
2025	Big Ten Championships	1st place, gold medalist(s)			7	3rd place, bronze medalist(s)	4
2025	NCAA Championships	2nd place, silver medalist(s)			44	2nd place, silver medalist(s)	

== See also ==
- Nationality changes in gymnastics
