= 2017 U.S. National Gymnastics Championships =

2017 P&G U.S. National Gymnastics Championships
- Venue: Honda Center
- Location: Anaheim, California, U.S.
- Date: August 17, 2017—August 20, 2017

The 2017 P&G U.S. National Gymnastics Championships is the 54th edition of the U.S. National Gymnastics Championships. The competition was held from August 17–20, 2017 at the Honda Center in Anaheim, California.

== Competition schedule ==
The competition featured Senior and Junior competitions for both women's and men's disciplines. The competition was as follows:

Thursday, August 17: Men's gymnastics — 1 p.m., juniors, and 7 p.m., seniors

Friday, August 18: Women's gymnastics — 1 p.m., juniors, and 7:30 p.m., seniors

Saturday, August 19: Men's gymnastics – 12 p.m., juniors, and 5 p.m., seniors

Sunday, August 20: Women's gymnastics – 11 a.m., juniors, and 3:30 p.m., seniors

== Sponsorship ==
Procter & Gamble, a multinational consumer goods company, is the title sponsor of the event.

== Medalists ==
Event	Gold	Silver	Bronze
Senior Men
Individual all-around	Yul Moldauer	Allan Bower	Donnell Whittenburg
Floor	Yul Moldauer Eddie Penev	—	Colin VanWicklen
Pommel horse	Alex Naddour	Sam Mikulak	Allan Bower
Rings	Michael Wilner Marvin Kimble	—	Donnell Whittenburg
Vault	Eddie Penev Donnell Whittenburg	—	Alex Powarzynski
Parallel bars	Akash Modi	Yul Moldauer	Donnell Whittenburg
Horizontal bar	Marvin Kimble	Colin VanWicklen	Sam Mikulak
Senior Women
Individual all-around	Ragan Smith	Jordan Chiles	Riley McCusker
Vault	Jade Carey	—	
Uneven bars	Riley McCusker	Ashton Locklear	Ragan Smith Marissa Oakley
Balance beam	Ragan Smith	Riley McCusker	Trinity Thomas
Floor	Ragan Smith	Jade Carey	Trinity Thomas
Junior Women
Individual all-around	Maile O'Keefe	Emma Malabuyo	Kara Eaker
Vault	Leanne Wong	Maile O'Keefe	Emma Malabuyo
Uneven bars	Maile O'Keefe	Emma Malabuyo	Gabby Perea
Balance beam	Kara Eaker	Maile O'Keefe	Adeline Kenlin
Floor	Emma Malabuyo	Maile O'Keefe	Leanne Wong
Junior Men (17–18)
Individual all-around	Brody Malone	Vitaliy Guimaraes	Max Andryushchenko
Junior Men (15–16)
Individual all-around	Garrett Braunton	Paul Juda	Riley Loos

== National team ==
The top 6 all-around females made the national team. For seniors, this consisted of Ragan Smith, Jordan Chiles. Riley McCusker, Trinity Thomas, Margzetta Frazier, and Morgan Hurd. Additionally, Jade Carey, the vault champion and floor silver medalist, and Ashton Locklear, the uneven bars silver medalist, were also named to the team. For juniors, Maile O'Keefe, Emma Malabuyo, Kara Eaker, Adeline Kenlin, Audrey Davis, and Leanne Wong were the top six all-around finishers. Additionally, uneven bars bronze medalist Gabby Perea was also named to the national team.

== Participants ==
The following individuals participated in the competition:

=== Women ===
- Shania Adams
- Elena Arenas
- Luisa Blanco
- Jade Carey
- Jordan Chiles
- Leah Clapper
- Frida Esparza
- Margzetta Frazier
- Emily Gaskins
- Morgan Hurd
- Sydney Johnson-Scharpf
- Ashton Locklear
- Riley McCusker
- Victoria Nguyen
- Marissa Oakley
- Abby Paulson
- Alyona Shchennikova
- Ragan Smith
- Deanne Soza
- Kaylany Steele
- Trinity Thomas
- Abigail Walker

==== Junior ====
- Ciena Alipio
- Sydney Barros
- Annie Beard
- Love Birt
- Jordan Bowers
- Audrey Davis
- Kayla DiCello
- Olivia Dunne
- Kara Eaker
- Addison Fatta
- Hannah Hagle
- Selena Harris
- Olivia Hollingsworth
- Madeleine Johnston
- Shilese Jones
- Adeline Kenlin
- Sunisa Lee
- Lillian Lippeatt
- Lauren Little
- Emma Malabuyo
- Jay Jay Marshall
- Grace McCallum
- Deiah-Marie Moody
- Maile O'Keefe
- Gabby Perea
- Anya Pilgrim
- Sienna Robinson
- Abigail Scanlon
- JaFree Scott
- Victoria Smirnov
- Madelyn Williams
- Leanne Wong

=== Men ===
- Donothan Bailey
- Cameron Bock
- Allan Bower
- Antonio Castro
- Adrian de los Angeles
- Chandler Eggleston
- Austin Epperson
- Trevor Howard
- Marvin Kimble
- Kyle King
- Jordan Kovach
- Anthony McCallum
- Sean Melton
- Sam Mikulak
- Akash Modi
- Yul Moldauer
- Zack Mollett
- Alex Naddour
- Stephen Nedoroscik
- Sean Neighbarger
- Brandon Ngai
- Kanji Oyama
- Eddie Penev
- Alex Powarzynski
- Micahel Reed
- Jalon Stephens
- Christopher Stephenson
- Jordan Valdez
- Colin Van Wicklen
- Kiwan Watts
- Matthew Wenske
- Donnell Whittenburg
- Michael Wilner
- Shane Wiskus
- Alec Yoder
