= 2015 U.S. National Gymnastics Championships =

2015 P&G U.S. National Gymnastics Championships
- Venue: Bankers Life Fieldhouse
- Location: Indianapolis, Indiana, U.S.
- Date: August 13, 2015—August 16, 2015

The 2015 P&G U.S. National Gymnastics Championships was the 52nd edition of the U.S. National Gymnastics Championships. The competition was held from August 13–16, 2015 at the Bankers Life Fieldhouse in Indianapolis, Indiana. It was the fourth time the competition has been held in the city.

== Event information ==
The fifty-second edition of the Championships, the competition was held at the Bankers Life Fieldhouse in Downtown Indianapolis, Indiana; the home arena of the Indiana Pacers. This was the fourth time the competition has been in the city; the last time being in 2005. However, the National governing body, USA Gymnastics, is headquartered in the city.

=== Competition schedule ===
The competition featured Senior and Junior competitions for both women's and men's disciplines. The competition was as follows;

Thursday, August 13

1:00 pm – Jr. Women's Competition – Day 1
7:00 pm – Sr. Women's Competition – Day 1

Friday, August 14

1:00 pm – Jr. Men's Competition – Day 1
7:00 pm – Sr. Men's Competition – Day 1

Saturday, August 15

1:00 pm – Jr. Women's Competition – Final Day
7:30 pm – Sr. Women's Competition – Final Day

Sunday, August 16

1:30 pm – Sr. Men's Competition – Final Day
7:30 pm – Jr. Men's Competition – Final Day

Note: all times are in Eastern Time Zone.

=== Sponsorship ===
Procter & Gamble, a multinational consumer goods company, was the title sponsor of the event; as part of the a deal the company signed with USA Gymnastics from 2013 to 2016. The competition was also presented by CoverGirl and Gilette. In addition, Vera Bradley, Deloitte, Kroger, OneAmerica, Faegre Baker Daniels and Washington National were all sponsoring the event.

== Medalists ==
Event	Gold	Silver	Bronze
Senior Men
Individual all-around	Sam Mikulak	Donnell Whittenburg	Chris Brooks
Floor	Steven Legendre	Donnell Whittenburg	Stacey Ervin
Pommel horse	Alex Naddour	Donothan Bailey	Sam Mikulak
Rings	Donnell Whittenburg	Brandon Wynn	C.J. Maestas Steven Lacombe
Vault	Sam Mikulak	Paul Ruggeri	Donnell Whittenburg
Parallel bars	Sam Mikulak	Chris Brooks	Danell Leyva
Horizontal bar	Chris Brooks	Paul Ruggeri	Sam Mikulak
Junior Men
Individual all-around	15-16: Davis Grooms; 17-18: Kiwan Watts	15-16: Shane Wiskus; 17-18: Jordan King	15-16: Tanner Justus / Matthew Wenske; 17-18: Levi Anderson
Floor	15-16: Alexei Verny; 17-18: Levi Anderson	15-16: Shane Wiskus; 17-18: Jordan King	15-16: Matthew Wenske; 17-18: Anton Stephenson
Pommel horse	15-16: Nicholas Merryman; 17-18: Kiwan Watts / Jordan King	15-16: Bennet Huang; 17-18: none awarded	15-16: Favian Valdez; 17-18: Anton Stephenson
Rings	15-16: Shane Wiskus; 17-18: Kiwan Watts	15-16: Davis Grooms; 17-18: Jordan King	15-16: Matthew Wenske; 17-18: Tanner West
Vault	15-16: Tanner Justus; 17-18: Emyre Cole	15-16: Bennet Huang; 17-18: Anton Stephenson	15-16: Mitchell Brown; 17-18: Kiwan Watts
Parallel bars	15-16: Matthew Wenske; 17-18: Anton Stephenson	15-16: Alexei Verny; 17-18: Jordan King	15-16: Shane Wiskus; 17-18: Levi Anderson
Horizontal bar	15-16: Davis Grooms; 17-18: Levi Anderson	15-16: Mitchell Mandozzi / Addison Chung; 17-18: Kiwan Watts	15-16: none awarded 17-18: Jordan King
Senior Women
Individual all-around	Simone Biles	Maggie Nichols	Aly Raisman
Vault	Simone Biles	MyKayla Skinner	—N/a
Uneven bars	Madison Kocian	Ashton Locklear	Bailie Key
Balance beam	Simone Biles	Alyssa Baumann	Kyla Ross
Floor	Aly Raisman	Simone Biles	MyKayla Skinner Bailie Key
Junior Women
Individual all-around	Laurie Hernandez	Jazmyn Foberg	Ragan Smith
Vault	Jordan Chiles	Jazmyn Foberg	Laurie Hernandez Emily Gaskins
Uneven bars	Laurie Hernandez	Jazmyn Foberg	Alyona Shchennikova
Balance beam	Ragan Smith	Jazmyn Foberg	Laurie Hernandez
Floor	Ragan Smith	Laurie Hernandez	Christina Desiderio

== Participants ==
Senior men	Junior men 17–18	Junior men 15–16	Senior women	Junior women
Donothan Bailey	Levi Anderson	Maxim Andryushchenko	Alyssa Baumann	Shania Adams
Dmitri Belanovski	Tristan Burke	Andrew Bitner	Simone Biles	Elena Arenas
Danny Berardini	Michael Burns	Cameron Bock	Nia Dennis	Rachel Baumann
Andrew Botto	Emyre Cole	Andrew Brower	Madison Desch	Aria Brusch
Allan Bower	Peter Daggett	Mitchell Brown	Gabby Douglas	Jordan Chiles
Jack Boyle	Marcos Gatinho	Addison Chung	Brenna Dowell	Christina Desiderio
Chris Brooks	Jordan King	Ethan Esval	Rachel Gowey	Olivia Dunne
Leroy Clarke	Yul Moldauer	Davis Grooms	Amelia Hundley	Colbi Flory
Adrian de los Angeles	Anton Stephenson	Andrew Herrador	Bailie Key	Jazmyn Foberg
Josh Dixon	Kiwan Watts	Bennet Huang	Madison Kocian	Margzetta Frazier
Stacey Ervin	Tanner West	Evan Hymanson	Ashton Locklear	Megan Freed
Matt Felleman		Tanner Justus	Lauren Navarro	Emily Gaskins
Jonathan Horton		Griffin Kehler	Maggie Nichols	Lauren Hernandez
Trevor Howard		Timothy Kutyla	Aly Raisman	Morgan Hurd
Nicholas Hunter		Dante LaBarre	Kyla Ross	Sydney Johnson-Scharpf
Hunter Justus		Connor Lewis	Emily Schild	Shilese Jones
Marvin Kimble		Jacob Light	Polina Shchennikova	Emma Malabuyo
Steven Lacombe		Mitchell Mandozzi	Megan Skaggs	Maile O'Keefe
Steven Legendre		Joshua Martin	Mykayla Skinner	Abby Paulson
Danell Leyva		Nicholas Merryman		Gabby Perea
C.J. Maestas		Jacob Moore		Grace Quinn
Sean Melton		Brennan Pantazis		Alyona Shchennikova
Sam Mikulak		Bailey Perez		Ragan Smith
Akash Modi		Shane Sadighi		Deanne Soza
Alex Naddour		Favian Valdez		Tori Tatum
Robert Neff		Alexei Vernyi		Trinity Thomas
Eddie Penev		Anton Vorono		Olivia Trautman
Michael Reid		Matthew Wenske		Abigail Walker
Paul Ruggeri		Shane Wiskus		
Colin Van Wicklen		Daniel Yoon		
Donnell Whittenburg		Josh Zeal		
Kevin Wolting				
Brandon Wynn				
Alec Yoder				
Kyle Zemeir				
