= Maile O'Keefe =

American artistic gymnast (born 2002)

- Full name: Maile Suzanne O'Keefe
- Born: February 26, 2002 (age 24) Las Vegas, Nevada, U.S.

Gymnastics career
- Discipline: Women's artistic gymnastics
- Country represented: United States (2016–2018)
- College team: Utah Red Rocks (2020–24)
- Club: Salcianu Elite Academy of Gymnastics
- Head coaches: Tammy Salcianu; Sorin Salcianu; Tom Farden
Medal record
Representing the United States
FIG World Cup
Event / 1st / 2nd / 3rd; All-Around World Cup / 0 / 0 / 1
Representing Utah Red Rocks
NCAA Championships
Gold medal – first place	2021 Fort Worth	Uneven Bars
Gold medal – first place	2021 Fort Worth	Floor Exercise
Gold medal – first place	2023 Fort Worth	All-Around
Gold medal – first place	2023 Fort Worth	Balance Beam
Silver medal – second place	2023 Fort Worth	Uneven Bars
Silver medal – second place	2024 Fort Worth	Floor Exercise
Bronze medal – third place	2021 Fort Worth	Team
Bronze medal – third place	2022 Fort Worth	Team
Bronze medal – third place	2023 Fort Worth	Team
Bronze medal – third place	2024 Fort Worth	Team
Bronze medal – third place	2024 Fort Worth	Balance Beam

Maile O'Keefe (/ˈmaɪli/ MY-lee) (born February 26, 2002) is an American artistic gymnast. She was a member of the U.S. National Team and is the 2016 and 2017 U.S. Junior National Champion. She is the 2023 NCAA all-around champion as well as a 4x NCAA event champion.

== Early life ==
O'Keefe was born on February 26, 2002, to Matthew and Tori Lynn O'Keefe in Las Vegas, Nevada. She has three siblings, Paige, Caitlin & Dylan. She completed high school through Odyssey Charter School, graduating a year early in 2019.

== Elite gymnastics career ==
=== 2013 ===
In 2013, O'Keefe, then eleven, was a level 9 gymnast. She attended a developmental camp at the Karolyi Ranch where she earned the opportunity to compete at an elite qualifier. At the qualifier, she performed at a high enough level where she was qualified to Junior Elite status, bypassing level 10 completely.

=== 2014–16 ===
O'Keefe competed at various domestic meets. She finished 13th and 17th at the 2014 and 2015 National Championships respectively. She encountered breakthrough during the 2016 season, where she won the all-around title in the Junior division at the 2016 U.S. National Gymnastics Championships, in addition to the beam and floor titles too.

=== 2017 ===
In March, O'Keefe competed at International Gymnix in Canada where she placed first in the all-around and finished top three on every event. In April, she participated in the 2017 City of Jesolo Trophy. In Jesolo she finished second in the all-around behind Gabby Perea. O'Keefe also won bronze medals in the uneven bars and balance beam finals, as well as a silver medal in the floor exercise final. In June O'Keefe announced that she had verbally committed to attend the University of Utah on a gymnastics scholarship. In August, she won the all-around at the 2017 U.S. National Gymnastics Championships. She along with silver medalist Emma Malabuyo were selected to represent the USA at the 2017 International Junior Gymnastics Competition the following month in Japan. There O'Keefe won gold in the all-around and on beam and silver on floor, vault, and uneven bars.

=== 2018–19 ===
O'Keefe became age-eligible for senior competition in 2018. In February she was named as the wildcard athlete for the 2018 American Cup. In her senior international debut, O'Keefe finished third with a score of 54.365, behind fellow American Morgan Hurd and Mai Murakami of Japan. In the spring O'Keefe underwent wrist surgery to fix a ganglion cyst. She spent the remainder of the year recovering.

In early 2019, O'Keefe announced that she had dropped back down to level 10. Her first meet was at the Brestyan’s Las Vegas Invitational in February. After the meet she announced that she received early admission to the University of Utah and would be competing with their gymnastics program in the 2019–2020 season.

== Collegiate gymnastics career ==
O'Keefe signed her National Letter of Intent with the University of Utah in March 2019. She joined Abby Paulson, Jillian Hoffman, and Jaedyn Rucker as the freshmen class of the 2019–2020 season.

=== 2019–2020 season ===
O'Keefe made her NCAA debut in a meet against the Kentucky Wildcats where she competed on vault, uneven bars, and balance beam to help Utah win 196.425 to 195.350. She made her all-around debut at the inaugural Best of Utah meet against BYU, Southern Utah, and Utah State, where she helped Utah win and individually she placed third in the all-around.

=== 2020–2021 season ===
In a meet against defending national champions the Oklahoma Sooners, O'Keefe competed all four events. Although Utah lost, O'Keefe claimed the all-around and balance beam titles with scores of 39.550 and 9.95 respectively. She was subsequently named as the Pac-12 gymnast of the week. The following week in a meet against Arizona O'Keefe only competed on vault, uneven bars, and balance beam. She received the highest score, a 9.90, on the latter two events.

On January 30, in a meet against Washington, O'Keefe earned her first perfect 10, achieving this score on the balance beam. Additionally she won the all-around with a score of 39.525. As a result O'Keefe was named as the Pac-12 gymnast of the week for the second time this season.

After the regular season concluded, O'Keefe was announced as the Pac-12 Gymnast of the Year. In March O'Keefe competed at the Pac-12 Conference Championships. She helped Utah finish first while individually winning the all-around title and co-winning the uneven bars, balance beam, and floor exercise titles.

In April O'Keefe competed at the NCAA Championships. She competed all four events for Utah and finished 11th in the all-around after having minor issues on the balance beam. However she finished first on both the uneven bars (tied with Maya Bordas of California) and on floor exercise (tied with Lexi Graber of Alabama and Anastasia Webb of Oklahoma). Additionally she helped Utah advance to the team finals. During the team finals O'Keefe recorded the highest balance beam and uneven bars scores of the day and helped Utah place third.

=== 2021–2022 season ===
O'Keefe competed at the Best of Utah meet where she competed on only the uneven bars and balance beam to help Utah win. She put up the highest uneven bars score of the night, a 9.875. On January 29, in a meet against Stanford, O'Keefe earned her second career perfect ten on the balance beam. As a result she was named Pac-12 gymnast of the week.

O'Keefe was named Pac-12 Specialist of the Year. At the Pac-12 Championships O'Keefe helped Utah win their second consecutive team title. Individually she placed third in the all-around behind Jade Carey and teammate Grace McCallum.

=== 2022–2023 season ===
O'Keefe spent the majority of the regular season only competing on uneven bars, balance beam, and floor exercise. She earned three perfect tens on balance beam on February 3, 11, and 24. However, after teammate Grace McCallum suffered an injury, O'Keefe began training on vault again. Even though O'Keefe had started competing in the all-around, she was named Pac-12 Specialist of the Year for the second consecutive year. At the Pac-12 Championships O'Keefe led Utah to their third consecutive title and individually placed second in the all-around behind Jade Carey.

In the post season O'Keefe earned her fourth perfect ten on balance beam while competing at the UCLA regional semifinal. On the first day of the NCAA Championships O'Keefe helped Utah qualify to the final. Individually she earned her fifth perfect ten of the season on balance beam and earned the balance beam title. Additionally she won the all-around title ahead of Jordan Chiles and Haleigh Bryant. At the NCAA team finals O'Keefe helped Utah place third for the third consecutive year and also earned her sixth perfect ten of the season on balance beam. In winning the all-around and balance beam titles, O'Keefe became the seventh NCAA gymnast to win an individual title on at least four of the five events after she had won the uneven bars and floor exercise titles in 2021.

=== Career perfect 10.0 ===
Season	Date	Event	Meet
2021	January 30, 2021	Balance Beam	Utah vs Washington
2022	January 29, 2022	Balance Beam	Utah vs Stanford
2022	March 4, 2022	Uneven Bars Balance Beam	Utah vs Minnesota
2022	April 2, 2022	Balance Beam	NCAA Regional Finals
2023	February 3, 2023	Balance Beam	Utah vs UCLA
2023	February 11, 2023	Balance Beam	Metroplex
2023	February 24, 2023	Balance Beam	Utah vs California
2023	March 30, 2023	Balance Beam	UCLA Regional Semifinal
2023	April 13, 2023	Balance Beam	NCAA Championship Semifinal
2023	April 15, 2023	Balance Beam	NCAA Championship Final
2024	January 5, 2024	Balance Beam	Utah vs Boise State
2024	January 15, 2024	Balance Beam	Best of Utah
2024	February 2, 2024	Balance Beam	Utah vs Oregon State
2024	March 23, 2024	Balance Beam	Pac-12 Championships

=== NCAA Regular season ranking ===
Season	All-Around	Vault	Uneven Bars	Balance Beam	Floor Exercise
2020 (Note: The season was cancelled after the 10th week of competition due to the coronavirus pandemic.)	N/A	N/A	152nd	13th	66th
2021	6th	58th	11th	1st	33rd
2022	N/A	N/A	52nd	3rd	30th
2023	N/A	N/A	18th	1st	51st
2024	N/A	N/A	33rd	2nd	24th

== Competitive history ==
Year	Event	Team	AA	VT	UB	BB	FX
Junior
2013	American Classic		9	8	8		
2014	American Classic		6		2nd place, silver medalist(s)		
2014	U.S. Classic		6			6	2nd place, silver medalist(s)
2014	P&G National Championships		13	19	14	16	13
2015	American Classic		7		4		
2015	P&G National Championships		17	19	16	10	13
2016	American Classic		8			4	1st place, gold medalist(s)
2016	U.S. Classic		6	6		4	4
2016	P&G National Championships		1st place, gold medalist(s)	3rd place, bronze medalist(s)	6	1st place, gold medalist(s)	1st place, gold medalist(s)
2017	Gymnix International	1st place, gold medalist(s)	1st place, gold medalist(s)	2nd place, silver medalist(s)		3rd place, bronze medalist(s)	1st place, gold medalist(s)
2017	City of Jesolo Trophy	1st place, gold medalist(s)	2nd place, silver medalist(s)		3rd place, bronze medalist(s)	3rd place, bronze medalist(s)	2nd place, silver medalist(s)
2017	U.S. Classic		2nd place, silver medalist(s)	2nd place, silver medalist(s)	4		2nd place, silver medalist(s)
2017	P&G National Championships		1st place, gold medalist(s)	2nd place, silver medalist(s)	1st place, gold medalist(s)	2nd place, silver medalist(s)	2nd place, silver medalist(s)
2017	Junior Japan International		1st place, gold medalist(s)	2nd place, silver medalist(s)	2nd place, silver medalist(s)	1st place, gold medalist(s)	2nd place, silver medalist(s)
Senior
2018	American Cup		3rd place, bronze medalist(s)				
NCAA
2020	PAC-12 Championships	Canceled due to the COVID-19 pandemic in the USA					
2020	NCAA Championships	Canceled due to the COVID-19 pandemic in the USA					
2021	Pac-12 Championships	1st place, gold medalist(s)	1st place, gold medalist(s)	7	1st place, gold medalist(s)	1st place, gold medalist(s)	1st place, gold medalist(s)
2021	NCAA Championships	3rd place, bronze medalist(s)	11		1st place, gold medalist(s)		1st place, gold medalist(s)
2022	Pac-12 Championships	1st place, gold medalist(s)	3rd place, bronze medalist(s)			2nd place, silver medalist(s)	3rd place, bronze medalist(s)
2022	NCAA Championships	3rd place, bronze medalist(s)	10		13	4	
2023	Pac-12 Championships	1st place, gold medalist(s)	2nd place, silver medalist(s)	10	4	3rd place, bronze medalist(s)	3rd place, bronze medalist(s)
2023	NCAA Championships	3rd place, bronze medalist(s)	1st place, gold medalist(s)	19	2nd place, silver medalist(s)	1st place, gold medalist(s)	4
2024	Pac-12 Championships	1st place, gold medalist(s)			34	1st place, gold medalist(s)	2nd place, silver medalist(s)
2024	NCAA Championships	3rd place, bronze medalist(s)			44	3rd place, bronze medalist(s)	2nd place, silver medalist(s)
