= 2017 U.S. Classic =

2017 Secret U.S. Classic
- Venue: Sears Centre Arena
- Location: Chicago, Illinois
- Dates: July 29, 2017

Medalists
gold medal	Alyona Shchennikova; Emma Malabuyo
silver medal	Abby Paulson; Maile O'Keefe
bronze medal	Kalyany Steele & Luisa Blanco; Grace McCallum

The 2017 U.S. Classic, known as the 2017 Secret U.S. Classic for sponsorship reasons, was the 34th edition of the U.S. Classic gymnastics tournament. The competition was held on July 29, 2017, at the Sears Centre Arena in the Hoffman Estates suburb of Chicago, Illinois.

== Medalists ==
Event	Gold	Silver	Bronze
Senior
All-Around	Alyona Shchennikova	Abby Paulson	Kalyany Steele Luisa Blanco
Vault	Jade Carey	—	
Uneven Bars	Ragan Smith	Alyona Shchennikova	Trinity Thomas
Balance Beam	Ragan Smith	Luisa Blanco	Trinity Thomas
Floor Exercise	Jade Carey	Morgan Hurd	Emily Gaskins
Junior
All-Around	Emma Malabuyo	Maile O'Keefe	Grace McCallum
Vault	Grace McCallum	Maile O'Keefe	Jay Jay Marshall
Uneven Bars	Gabby Perea	Madelyn Williams	Adeline Kenlin
Balance Beam	Adeline Kenlin	Emma Malabuyo	Kara Eaker
Floor Exercise	Emma Malabuyo	Maile O'Keefe	Annie Beard

== Participants ==
=== Seniors ===
- Shania Adams – Plain City, Ohio (Buckeye Gymnastics)
- Elena Arenas – Bishop, Georgia (Georgia Elite)
- Luisa Blanco – Plano, Texas (WOGA)
- Jade Carey – Phoenix, Arizona (Oasis Gymnastics)
- Jordan Chiles – Vancouver, Washington (Naydenov Gymnastics, Inc.)
- Leah Clapper – Ann Arbor, Michigan (Gym America)
- Frida Esparza – Pittsburg, California (Head Over Heels)
- Margzetta Frazier – Erial, New Jersey (Parkettes)
- Emily Gaskins – Coral Springs, Florida (Palm Beach)
- Morgan Hurd – Middletown, Delaware (First State Gymnastics)
- Sydney Johnson-Scharpf – Groveland, Florida (Brandy Johnson's Global Gymnastics)
- Laney Madsen – Costa Mesa, California (Gym-Max)
- Riley McCusker – Brielle, New Jersey (MG Elite)
- Marissa Oakley – Oswego, Illinois (Everest Gymnastics)
- Abby Paulson – Coon Rapids, Minnesota (Twin City Twisters)
- Ashton Locklear – Hamlet, North Carolina (Everest)
- Alyona Shchennikova – Layton, Utah (5280 Gymnastics)
- Ragan Smith – Lewisville, Texas (Texas Dreams)
- Deanne Soza – Coppell, Texas (Texas Dreams)
- Trinity Thomas – York, Pennsylvania (Prestige Gymnastics)
- Kalyany Steele – Colorado Springs, Colorado (Colorado Aerials Gymnastics Center)
- Abi Walker – Carrollton, Texas (Texas Dreams)
