= 2016 U.S. Classic =

Gymnastics tournament

2016 Secret U.S. Classic
- Venue: XL Center
- Location: Hartford, Connecticut
- Dates: June 4, 2016

Medalists
gold medal	Aly Raisman; Irina Alexeeva
silver medal	Rachel Gowey; Emma Malabuyo
bronze medal	Alyssa Baumann; Gabby Perea

The 2016 U.S. Classic, known as the 2016 Secret U.S. Classic for sponsorship reasons, was the 33rd edition of the U.S. Classic gymnastics tournament. The competition was held on June 4, 2016, at the XL Center in Hartford, Connecticut.

Historically, it was the first time the competition was held in the city of Hartford, or indeed the state of Connecticut. Additionally, being held in conjunction with the men's P&G U.S. Nationals, it was the first edition to have been combined with the event. The competition served as the start of the 2016 USA Gymnastics elite season and, although not officially, the start of the USA Gymnastics 2016 Olympics team selection process.

Tickets for the event went on sale on January 15, 2016.

== Medalists ==
Event	Gold	Silver	Bronze
Senior
All-Around	Aly Raisman	Rachel Gowey	Alyssa Baumann
Vault	Aly Raisman	MyKayla Skinner	Amelia Hundley
Uneven Bars	Ashton Locklear	Madison Kocian	Gabby Douglas
Balance Beam	Simone Biles	Alyssa Baumann	Aly Raisman
Floor Exercise	Aly Raisman	Alyssa Baumann	Christina Desiderio
Junior
All-Around	Irina Alexeeva	Emma Malabuyo	Gabby Perea
Vault	Jordan Chiles	Elena Arenas	Kalyany Steele
Uneven Bars	Gabby Perea	Morgan Hurd	Alyona Shchennikova
Balance Beam	Irina Alexeeva	Gabby Perea	Emma Malabuyo
Floor Exercise	Morgan Hurd	Irina Alexeeva	Aria Brusch

== Participants ==
=== Seniors ===
- Alyssa Baumann – Plano, Texas (WOGA)
- Simone Biles – Spring, Texas (WCC)
- Leah Clapper – Ann Arbor, Michigan (Twistars USA, Inc.)
- Kaitlin De Guzman – Rowlett, Texas (Metroplex)
- Christina Desiderio – Hackettstown, New Jersey (Parkettes)
- Gabby Douglas – Tarzana, California (Buckeye)
- Brenna Dowell – Odessa, Missouri (GAGE)
- Jazmyn Foberg – Bayville, New Jersey (MG Elite, Inc.)
- Margzetta Frazier – Erial, New Jersey (Parkettes)
- Emily Gaskins – Coral Springs, Florida (Palm Beach)
- Rachel Gowey – Urbandale, Iowa (Chow's)
- Laurie Hernandez – Old Bridge, New Jersey (MG Elite, Inc.)
- Amelia Hundley – Hamilton, Ohio (Cincinnati)
- Madison Kocian – Dallas, Texas (WOGA)
- Maggie Musselman – Crownsville, Maryland (Hill's)
- Abby Paulson – Coon Rapids, Minnesota (Twin City Twisters)
- Ashton Locklear – Hamlet, North Carolina (Everest)
- Lauren Navarro – La Verne, California (Charter Oak)
- Aly Raisman – Needham, Massachusetts (Brestyan's)
- Lexy Ramler – St. Michael, Minnesota (KidSport, LLC.)
- Emily Schild – Huntersville, North Carolina (Everest)
- MyKayla Skinner – Gilbert, Arizona (Desert Lights)
- Ragan Smith – Lewisville, Texas (Texas Dreams)
- Olivia Trautman – Champlin, Minnesota (Twin City Twisters)
