= 2017 in gymnastics =

The following were the events of gymnastics for the year 2017 throughout the world.

== Acrobatic gymnastics ==
- March 1–5: FIG World Cup No. 1 in Maia
  - Pair winners: Belgium (Kilian Goffaux & Robin Casse) (m) / Belgium (Noémie Lammertyn & Lore Vanden Berghe) (f)
  - Group winners: Israel (Yannay Kalfa, Daniel Uralevitch, Lidar Dana, Efi Sach) (m) / Belarus (Julia Ivonchyk, Veronika Nabokina, Karina Sandovich) (f)
  - Mixed pair winners: Russia (Elena Murashko & Ivan Nesterenko)
- April 7–9: FIG World Cup #2 in Puurs
  - Pair winners: Belgium (Kilian Goffaux & Robin Casse) (m) / Belgium (Noémie Lammertyn & Lore Vanden Berghe) (f)
  - Group winners: Great Britain (Conor Sawenko, Charlie Tate, Adam Upcott, Lewis Watts) (m) / Belarus (Julia Ivonchyk, Veronika Nabokina, Karina Sandovich) (f)
  - Mixed pair winners: Portugal (Carolina Dias & Joao Martins)
- May 25–27: FIG World Cup #3 in Geneva
  - Pair winners: Russia (Dmitry & Maksim Ivanov) (m) / China (MENG Jie & WU Shiheng) (f; default)
  - Group winners: Great Britain (Paul & Steven Dixon, Finnian Gavin, Jesse Heskett) (m) / China (DUAN Yushan, JI Qiuqiong & LIU Jieyu) (f)
  - Mixed pair winners: Portugal (Carolina Dias & Joao Martins)
- September 8–10: FIG World Cup #4 in Lisbon
  - Pair winners: Belarus (Artsiom Yashchanka & Aliaksei Zayats) (m) / Belgium (Noemie Lammertyn & Lore Vanden Berghe) (f)
  - Group winners: Israel (Lidar Dana, Yannay Kalfa, Efi Efraim Sach, & Daniel Uralevitch) (m) / Russia (Polina Galanova, Viktoriia Kudriavtseva & Alina Petrova) (f)
  - Mixed pair winners: Portugal (Carolina Dias & Joao Martins)
- September 17–19: 2017 Asian Acrobatic Gymnastics Championships in Almaty
  - Pair winners: North Korea (KONG Yong Won & RI Hyo Song) (m) / North Korea (Jong Kum-hwa & PYON Yun Ae) (f)
  - Group winners: China (FU Zhi, GUO Pei, JIANG Heng, & ZHANG Junshuo) (m) / Kazakhstan (Alyona Bavsunovskaya, Saida Burkit, & Polina Slastenko) (f; default)
  - Mixed pair winners: Kazakhstan (Dmitriy Fedkovich & Angelina Yanitskaya)
- October 13–15: 2017 Pan American Acrobatic Gymnastics Championships in Daytona Beach
  - Pair winners: United States (Emily Davis & Aubrey Rosilier)
  - Mixed pair winners: United States (Tiffani Williams & Axl Osborne)
  - Group finals winners: Brazil (Dos Rodrigues Florentino & Alexa Reis de Freitas)
- October 19–22: 2017 European Acrobatics Championships in Rzeszów
  - Russia won both the gold and overall medal tallies.

== Aerobic gymnastics ==
- April 22 & 23: FIG Suzuki World Cup 2017 in Tokyo
  - Individual winners: Mizuki Saito (m) / Riri Kitazume (f)
  - Mixed pair winners: Spain (Vicente Lli & Sara Moreno)
  - Trio winners: Japan (Takumi Kanai, Riri Kitazume, & Mizuki Saito)
  - Group winners: China (JIANG Shuai, LI Lingxiao, LI Qi. PAN Lixi & XU Xuesong)
- May 26–28: FIG World Cup 2017 in Cantanhede
  - Individual winners: Daniel Bali (m) / Riri Kitazume (f)
  - Mixed pair winners: Spain (Vicente Lli & Sara Moreno)
  - Trio winners: Russia (Elena Ivanova, Ekaterina Pykhtova, & Anastasiia Ziubina)
  - Group winners: Hungary (Daniel Bali, Balazs Farkas, Dora Hegyi, Fanni Mazacs, & Panna Szollosi)
- September 15–17: 2017 Asian Aerobic Gymnastics Championships in Ulaanbaatar
  - Individual winners: PAN Lixi (m) / Riri Kitazume (f)
  - Mixed pair winners: China (WANG Ke & WANG Xinyu)
  - Trio winners: Vietnam (Viet Anh Nguyen, Ngoc Thuy Vi Tran, & Hoai An Vuong)
  - Group winners: Vietnam
- September 22–24: 2017 Aerobic Gymnastics European Championships in Ancona
  - Individual winners: Daniel Bali (m) / Belen Guillemot (f)
  - Mixed pair winners: Spain (Sara Moreno & Vicente Lli)
  - Trio winners: Romania (Gabriel Bocser, Andreea Bogati, & Marian Brotei)
  - Group winners: Romania
  - Step winners: Russia
  - Aerodance winners: Russia
- October 27–29: 2017 Pan American Aerobic Gymnastics Championships in Bogotá
  - Individual winners: Iván Veloz (m) / Daiana Nanzer (f)
  - Mixed pair winners: Brazil (Lucas Barbosa & Tamires Silva)
  - Trio winners: Argentina (Florencia Cagnola, Catalina Juri, & Rocio Veliz)
  - Group winners: Argentina
  - Aerodance winners: Mexico

== Artistic gymnastics ==
- February 22–25: FIG World Cup 2017 No. 1 in Melbourne
  - Floor winners: Kenzō Shirai (m) / Emily Little (f)
  - Vault winners: Kenzō Shirai (m) / Wang Yan (f)
  - Men's horizontal bar winner: Kenzō Shirai
  - Men's parallel bars winner: ZOU Jingyuan
  - Men's pommel horse winner: Krisztián Berki
  - Men's rings winner: WU Guanhua
  - Women's beam winner: Liu Tingting
  - Women's uneven bars winner: Liu Tingting
- March 4: FIG American Cup Individual All-Around World Cup 2017 (#1) in Newark, New Jersey
  - All-Around winners: Yul Moldauer (m) / Ragan Smith (f)
- March 16–19: FIG World Cup 2017 AGF Trophy (#2) in Baku
  - Floor winners: Tomas Kuzmickas (m) / Cătălina Ponor (f)
  - Vault winners: Christopher Remkes (m) / Oksana Chusovitina (f)
  - Men's horizontal bar winner: Naoto Hayasaka
  - Men's parallel bars winner: LIU Rongbing
  - Men's pommel horse winner: WENG Hao
  - Men's rings winner: Eleftherios Petrounias
  - Women's beam winner: Cătălina Ponor
  - Women's Uneven bars winner: Diana Varinska
- March 18 & 19: FIG EnBW DTB-Pokal Individual All-Around World Cup 2017 (#2) in Stuttgart
  - All-Around winners: Oleg Verniaiev (m) / Tabea Alt (f)
- March 22–25: FIG World Cup 2017 No. 2 in Doha
  - Floor winners: TANG Chia-Hung (m) / Liu Tingting (f)
  - Vault winners: Lê Thánh Tung / Oksana Chusovitina (f)
  - Men's horizontal bar winner: XIAO Ruoteng
  - Men's parallel bars winner: ZOU Jingyuan
  - Men's pommel horse winner: Krisztián Berki
  - Men's rings winner: Artur Tovmasyan
  - Women's beam winner: Liu Tingting
  - Women's uneven bars winner: Luo Huan
- April 8: FIG Individual All-Around World Cup 2017 (#3) in London
  - All-Around winners: Oleg Verniaiev (m) / Tabea Alt (f)
- April 19–23: 2017 European Artistic Gymnastics Championships in Cluj-Napoca
  - All-Around winners: Oleg Verniaiev (m) / Ellie Downie (f)
  - Floor winners: Marian Drăgulescu (m) / Angelina Melnikova (f)
  - Vault winners: Artur Dalaloyan (m) / Coline Devillard (f)
  - Men's horizontal bar winner: Pablo Brägger
  - Men's parallel bars winner: Oleg Verniaiev
  - Men's pommel horse winner: David Belyavskiy
  - Men's rings winner: Eleftherios Petrounias
  - Women's beam winner: Cătălina Ponor
  - Women's uneven bars winner: Nina Derwael
- May 12–14: FIG World Challenge Cup 2017 No. 1 in Koper
  - Floor winners: Eddie Penev (m) / Carina Kroell (f)
  - Vault winners: Andrey Medvedev (m) / Rebeca Andrade (f)
  - Men's horizontal bar winner: Tin Srbic
  - Men's parallel bars winner: Donnell Whittenburg
  - Men's pommel horse winner: Sašo Bertoncelj
  - Men's rings winner: Arthur Zanetti
  - Women's beam winner: Larisa Iordache
  - Women's uneven bars winner: Larisa Iordache
- May 16–21: 2017 Asian Artistic Gymnastics Championships in Bangkok
  - China won both the gold and overall medal tallies.
- May 18–21: FIG World Challenge Cup 2017 No. 2 in Osijek
  - Floor winners: Kirill Prokopev (m) / Thais Santos (f)
  - Vault winners: Audrys Nin Reyes (m) / Boglárka Dévai (f)
  - Men's horizontal bar winner: Tin Srbic
  - Men's parallel bars winner: Jossimar Calvo
  - Men's pommel horse winner: Rhys McClenaghan
  - Men's rings winner: Arthur Zanetti
  - Women's beam winner: Thais Santos
  - Women's uneven bars winner: Lilia Akhaimova
- September 1–3: FIG Individual Apparatus World Challenge Cup in Varna
  - Floor winners: Tomás González (m) / Thais Santos (f)
  - Vault winners: Ihor Radivilov (m) / Rebeca Andrade (f)
  - Men's horizontal bar winner: Caio Souza
  - Men's parallel bars winner: Petro Pakhnyuk
  - Men's pommel horse winner: Andrey Likhovitskiy
  - Men's rings winner: Ihor Radivilov
  - Women's beam winner: Daniele Hypólito
  - Women's uneven bars winner: Rebeca Andrade
- September 8–10: FIG World Challenge Cup 2017 #3 in Szombathely
  - Floor winners: Fuya Maeno (m) / Brooklyn Moors (f)
  - Vault winners: Marian Drăgulescu (m) / Marina Nekrasova (f)
  - Men's horizontal bar winner: Jossimar Calvo
  - Men's parallel bars winner: Kazuma Kaya
  - Men's pommel horse winner: Kazuma Kaya
  - Men's rings winner: İbrahim Çolak
  - Women's beam winner: Cătălina Ponor
  - Women's uneven bars winner: Jonna Adlerteg
- September 16 & 17: FIG World Challenge Cup–20th Internationaux de France 2017 (#4) in Paris
  - Floor winners: Jorge Vega Lopez (m) / Claudia Fragapane (f)
  - Vault winners: Audrys Nin Reyes (m) / Coline Devillard (f)
  - Men's horizontal bar winner: Epke Zonderland
  - Men's parallel bars winner: Oleg Verniaiev
  - Men's pommel horse winner: Takaaki Sugino
  - Men's rings winner: Eleftherios Petrounias
  - Women's beam winner: Larisa Iordache
  - Women's uneven bars winner: Nina Derwael
- October 2–8: 2017 Artistic Gymnastics World Championships in Montreal
  - All-Around winners: Xiao Ruoteng (m) / Morgan Hurd (f)
  - Floor winners: Kenzō Shirai (m) / Mai Murakami (f)
  - Vault winners: Kenzō Shirai (m) / Maria Paseka (f)
  - Men's horizontal bar winner: Tin Srbić
  - Men's parallel bars winner: ZOU Jingyuan
  - Men's pommel horse winner: Max Whitlock
  - Men's rings winner: Eleftherios Petrounias
  - Women's beam winner: Pauline Schäfer
  - Women's uneven bars winner: Fan Yilin
- November 23–26: 42nd Turnier der Meister FIG Individual Apparatus World Cup in Cottbus
  - Floor winners: Rok Klavora (m) / Lilia Akhaimova (f)
  - Vault winners: Keisuke Asato (m) / Oksana Chusovitina (f)
  - Men's horizontal bar winner: Andreas Bretschneider
  - Men's parallel bars winner: TAN Di
  - Men's pommel horse winner: WANG Junwen
  - Men's rings winner: Ihor Radivilov
  - Women's beam winner: WANG Cenyu
  - Women's uneven bars winner: Elisabeth Seitz

== Rhythmic gymnastics ==
- February 15–20: Grand Prix No. 1 in Moscow
  - All-Around winner: Dina Averina
  - Hoop winner: Dina Averina
  - Ball winner: Aleksandra Soldatova
  - Clubs winner: Dina Averina
  - Ribbon winner: Dina Averina
  - Junior individual winner: Lala Kramarenko
- March 17–19: Grand Prix #2 in Kyiv
  - All-Around winner: Polina Khonina
  - Hoop winner: Victoria Veinberg Filanovsky
  - Junior hoop winner: Krystyna Pohranychna
  - Ball winner: Katrin Taseva
  - Clubs winner: Iuliia Bravikova
  - Junior clubs winner: Krystyna Pohranychna
  - Ribbon winner: Iuliia Bravikova
- March 25 & 26: Grand Prix No. 3 in Thiais
  - All-Around winner: Dina Averina
  - Hoop winner: Dina Averina
  - Ball winner: Dina Averina
  - Clubs winner: Dina Averina
  - Ribbon winner: Iuliia Bravikova
  - Groups 3 ball & 2 ropes winners: Azerbaijan
  - Groups 5 hoops winners: Azerbaijan
- March 30 – April 2: Grand Prix Marbella in Marbella
  - All-Around winner: Aleksandra Soldatova
  - Ball winner: Aleksandra Soldatova
  - Hoop winner: Aleksandra Soldatova
  - Clubs winner: Aleksandra Soldatova
  - Ribbon winner: Aleksandra Soldatova
  - Junior all-round winner: Lala Kramarenko
  - Junior hoop winner: Lala Kramarenko
  - Junior ball winner: Lala Kramarenko
  - Junior clubs winner: Anastasia Sergeeva
  - Junior ribbon winner: Anastasia Sergeeva
  - Teams winners: Russia (Polina Shmatko, Lala Kramarenko)
- April 7–9: FIG World Cup 2017 No. 1 in Pesaro
  - All-Around winner: Aleksandra Soldatova
  - Hoop winner: Aleksandra Soldatova
  - Ball winner: Dina Averina
  - Clubs winner: Dina Averina
  - Ribbon winner: Dina Averina
  - Group all-round winners: Bulgaria
  - 5-hoop group winners: Italy
  - 3-ball & 2-rope group winners: Italy
- April 21–23: FIG World Cup 2017 #2 in Tashkent
  - All-Around winner: Dina Averina
  - Hoop winner: Arina Averina
  - Ball winner: Arina Averina
  - Clubs winner: Dina Averina
  - Ribbon winner: Arina Averina
  - Group All-Around winners: Russia
  - 5-hoop group winners: Russia
  - 3-ball & 2-rope group winners: Bulgaria
- April 28–30: FIG World Cup 2017 #3 in Baku
  - All-Around winner: Arina Averina
  - Hoop winner: Arina Averina
  - Ball winner: Aleksandra Soldatova
  - Clubs winner: Victoria Veinberg Filanovsky
  - Ribbon winner: Neviana Vladinova
  - Group All-Around winners: Bulgaria
  - 5-hoop group winners: Italy
  - 3-ball & 2-rope group winners: Ukraine
- May 5–7: FIG World Cup 2017 #4 in Sofia
  - All-Around winner: Neviana Vladinova
  - Hoop winner: Neviana Vladinova
  - Ball winner: Neviana Vladinova
  - Clubs winner: Alina Harnasko
  - Ribbon winner: Neviana Vladinova
  - Group All-Around winners: Bulgaria
  - 5-hoop group winners: Ukraine
  - 3-ball & 2-rope group winners: Ukraine
- May 12–14: FIG World Challenge Cup 2017 #1 in Portimão
  - All-Around winner: Iuliia Bravikova
  - Hoop winner: Victoria Veinberg Filanovsky
  - Ball winner: Victoria Veinberg Filanovsky
  - Clubs winner: Elizaveta Lugovskikh
  - Ribbon winner: Victoria Veinberg Filanovsky
  - Group All-Around winners: Italy
  - 5-hoop group winners: Italy
  - 3-ball & 2-rope group winners: Italy
- May 19–21: 2017 European Rhythmic Gymnastics Championships in Budapest
  - Hoop winner: Dina Averina
  - Ball winner: Arina Averina
  - Clubs winner: Arina Averina
  - Ribbon winner: Dina Averina
  - Group All-Around winners: Russia
- June 2–4: FIG World Challenge Cup 2017 #2 in Guadalajara, Castilla-La Mancha
  - Hoop winner: Ekaterina Selezneva
  - Ball winner: Polina Khonina
  - Clubs winner: Polina Khonina
  - Ribbon winner: Ekaterina Selezneva
  - Group All-Around winners: Russia
  - 5-hoop group winners: Japan
  - 3-ball & 2-rope group winners: Russia
- June 16–18: Grand Prix #4 in Saint Petersburg
- June 22–26: Grand Prix No. 5 in Holon
- June 24–27: 2017 Asian Senior & Junior Rhythmic Gymnastics Championships in Astana
  - Senior All-Around winner: Anastasiya Serdyukova
  - Senior hoop winner: Sabina Ashirbayeva
  - Senior ball winner: Sabina Ashirbayeva
  - Senior clubs winner: Anastasiya Serdyukova
  - Senior ribbon winner: Anastasiya Serdyukova
  - Senior team winners: Kazakhstan
  - Senior group All-Around winners: Japan
  - Senior 5-hoop group winners: Japan
  - Senior 3-ball & 2-rope group winners: Japan
- July 7–9: FIG Berlin Masters World Challenge Cup 2017 in Germany
  - All-Around winner: Katsiaryna Halkina
  - Hoop winner: Ekaterina Selezneva
  - Ball winner: Ekaterina Selezneva
  - Clubs winner: Iuliia Bravikova
  - Ribbon winner: Katsiaryna Halkina
  - Group All-Around winners: Russia
  - 5-hoop group winners: Russia
  - 3-ball & 2-rope group winners: Russia
- August 5 & 6: FIG World Challenge Cup 2017 – BSB Bank in Minsk
  - All-Around winner: Aleksandra Soldatova
  - Hoop winner: Neviana Vladinova
  - Ball winner: Katsiaryna Halkina
  - Clubs winner: Iuliia Bravikova
  - Ribbon winner: Iuliia Bravikova
  - Group All-Around winners: Italy
  - 5-hoop group winners: Bulgaria
  - 3-ball & 2-rope group winners: Belarus
- August 11–13: FIG World Challenge Cup 2017 #3 in Kazan
  - All-Around winner: Dina Averina
  - Hoop winner: Dina Averina
  - Ball winner: Arina Averina
  - Clubs winner: Dina Averina
  - Ribbon winner: Arina Averina
  - Group All-Around winners: Russia
  - 5-hoop group winners: Russia
  - 3-ball & 2-rope group winners: Russia
- August 30 – September 3: 2017 World Rhythmic Gymnastics Championships in Pesaro
  - All-Around winner: Dina Averina
  - Hoop winner: Dina Averina
  - Ball winner: Arina Averina
  - Clubs winner: Dina Averina
  - Ribbon winner: Arina Averina
  - Group All-Around winners: Russia
  - 5-hoop group winners: Italy
  - 3-ball & 2-rope group winners: Russia
- October 13–15: 2017 Pan American Rhythmic Gymnastics Championships in Daytona Beach, Florida
  - All-Around winner: Evita Griskenas
  - Hoop winner: Evita Griskenas
  - Ball winner: Evita Griskenas
  - Clubs winner: Evita Griskenas
  - Ribbon winner: Evita Griskenas
  - Group All-Around winners: Brazil
  - 5-hoop group winners: United States
  - 3-ball & 2-rope group winners: Brazil
  - Team winners: United States
- October 19–23: Grand Prix #6 in Brno

== Trampolining/Tumbling ==
- February 18 & 19: FIG World Cup 2017 No. 1 in Baku
  - Individual winners: Mikhail Melnik (m) / Susana Kochesok (f)
  - Synchronized winners: Kazakhstan (Pirmammad Aliyev & Danil Mussabayev) (m) / Belarus (Hanna Harchonak & Tatsiana Piatrenia) (f)
  - Tumbling winners: Grigory Noskov (m) / Anna Korobeinikova (f)
- August 18 & 19: FIG World Cup 2017 #2 in Minsk
  - Individual winners: Uladzislau Hancharou (m) / Yana Pavlova (f)
  - Synchronized winners: Belarus (Mikita Ilyinykh & Artsiom Zhuk) (m) / Belarus (Hanna Harchonak & Maryia Makharynskaya) (f)
- September 29 & 30: FIG World Cup 2017 #3 in Loulé
  - Individual winners: Gao Lei (m) / Yana Pavlova (f)
  - Synchronized winners: Belarus (Uladzislau Hancharou & Aleh Rabtsau) (m) / Japan (Chisato Doihata & Reina Satake) (f)
  - Tumbling winners: Mikhail Malkin (m) / JIA Fangfang (f)
- October 7 & 8: FIG World Cup 2017 #4 in Valladolid
  - Individual winners: Dong Dong (m) / ZHU Xueying (f)
  - Synchronized winners: Great Britain (Nathan Bailey & Luke Strong) (m) / Belarus (Maryia Makharynskaya & Tatsiana Piatrenia) (f)
  - Tumbling winners: Maxim Shlyakin (m) / Anna Korobeinikova (f)
- November 9–12: 2017 Trampoline World Championships in Sofia
  - China won the gold medal tally. China and Russia won 9 overall medals each.
