= Ashton Locklear =

American artistic gymnast

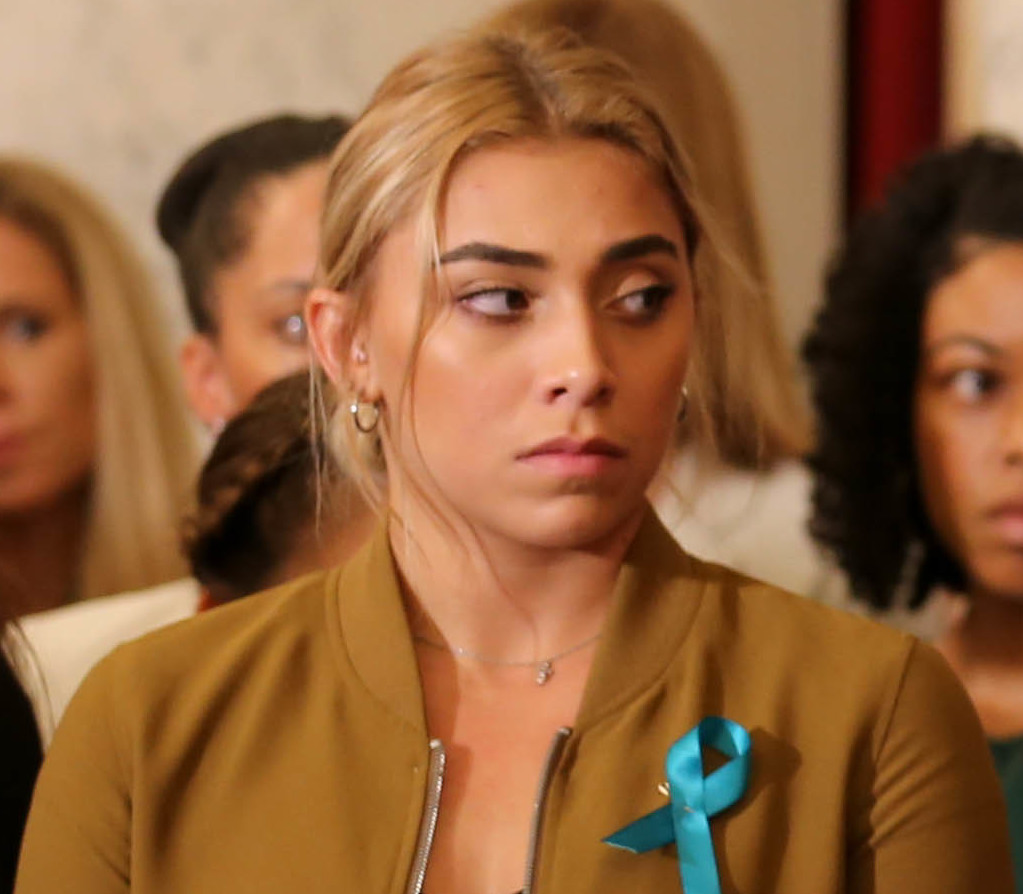
- Locklear in 2018

Personal information
- Full name: Ashton Taylor Locklear
- Born: January 13, 1998 (age 28) Lumberton, North Carolina, U.S.
- Height: 5 ft 4 in (163 cm)

Gymnastics career
- Discipline: Women's artistic gymnastics
- Country represented: United States; (2014—2018)
- Club: World Champions Centre
- Head coach: Laurent Landi
- Former coaches: Qi Han; Yiwen Chen; Kristie Phillips; Sergei Romanov
- Retired: May 16, 2019
Medal record
Representing United States
World Championships
Gold medal – first place	2014 Nanning	Team
Pan American Championships
Gold medal – first place	2014 Mississauga	Team
Gold medal – first place	2014 Mississauga	Uneven bars
Pacific Rim Championships
Gold medal – first place	2016 Everett	Team
Gold medal – first place	2016 Everett	Uneven bars

Ashton Taylor Locklear (born January 13, 1998) is an American former artistic gymnast. She was a member of the gold medal-winning United States team at the 2014 World Championships and is a two-time national champion on the uneven bars (2014, 2016). Locklear was an uneven bars specialist and was an alternate for the 2016 Summer Olympics U.S. gymnastics team, the Final Five. She is also the 2014 Pan American and the 2016 Pacific Rim champion on the uneven bars

== Personal life ==
Locklear was born in Lumberton, North Carolina, to Carrie and Terry Locklear. She has an older sister, Angelia, who is also a gymnast.

Locklear was homeschooled until 8th grade. She is Native American and a member of the Lumbee Tribe. She became Nike N7 ambassador in 2017.

== Gymnastics career ==
=== Pre-elite ===
At a young age, Locklear watched her older sister's gymnastics lessons and began imitating her. She also cited watching the 2000 Olympics on television as an inspiration to begin competing. She began her gymnastics career in trampolining, but later switched to artistic gymnastics. She began her study of gymnastics with Terry Barrett at Physical Awareness and Gymnastics, in Hamlet, NC.

Locklear's first championship was a state-level trampoline and tumbling title she earned at age five. After that she began training at KPAC (Kristie Phillips Athletic Center) in Lake Norman and was coached by Kristie Phillips for a while. When she was eleven years old, she began training at Everest Gymnastics in Huntersville, North Carolina, with coaches Qi Han (a former member of the Chinese men's national team and a graduate of Beijing Sports University) and his wife, Yiwen Chen. Because of the distance between Huntersville and Locklear's hometown of Hamlet, North Carolina her family maintains a second household near the gym.

==== 2013 ====
Locklear competed at the Nastia Liukin Cup in 2013 where she placed seventh in the all-around and on balance beam, first on uneven bars, and ninth on floor exercise. Later that year Locklear suffered a stress fracture in her back, which limited her to conditioning for approximately four months and forced her to stop competing on the floor exercise and vault.

=== Senior ===
==== 2014 ====
Locklear's breakout performances came during the 2014 season. At the Secret U.S. Classic, she finished first on the uneven bars with a score of 15.700, beating Kyla Ross, the reigning world silver medalist on bars, by more than half a point. In August, Locklear competed at the P&G Championships, where she became national champion on the uneven bars with scores of 15.850 on Day 1 and 15.200 on Day 2. She also placed eighth on balance beam, scoring 14.550 on Day 1 and 13.550 on Day 2. She was named to the national team and to the U.S. team for the Pan American Championships in Mississauga, Ontario.

In Mississauga, Locklear and her teammates (MyKayla Skinner, Maggie Nichols, Madison Desch, Amelia Hundley and Madison Kocian) won the team gold medal, beating silver medalist Brazil by more than six points. Locklear also won gold on the uneven bars with a score of 14.975.

On September 17, Locklear was selected to compete at the 2014 World Championships in Nanning, China. She helped the team to a gold medal and placed fourth in the uneven bars final with a score of 15.266.

==== 2015 ====
Early in 2015, Locklear sustained a shoulder injury and had to have surgery. Following intense physical therapy, she returned to elite competition and participated in the Secret U.S. Classic on July 25. She only competed exhibition routines, meaning she scored a 0 on both uneven bars and balance beam. She said that she would have her full difficulty back by the P&G Championships.

On August 13 and 15, Locklear competed on uneven bars and balance beam at the 2015 P&G Championships. On night 1, despite a lower start value (removed inbar stalders and used toe-on skills), she scored a 15.400 for the second highest bar score of the night. On beam, she fell on her back handspring–layout stepout series and scored a 12.950. On night 2, she scored a 15.400 on bars again and 13.750 on beam. She placed second on bars behind 2014 Worlds teammate Kocian and ahead of Bailie Key with a total score of 30.850. She placed 13th on beam with a total score of 26.700. A week after the competition, Locklear was named to the senior national team and invited to the 2015 Worlds selection camp.

Locklear initially committed to the University of Florida, but on September 10, 2015, the information was changed on her USA Gymnastics athlete profile to "undecided", prompting speculation that she had uncommitted. She later changed her Twitter biography, too. Almost a month later, on October 2, 2015, she confirmed on her personal Ask.fm account that she had decided to forgo NCAA eligibility.

==== 2016 ====
Ashton began her 2016 season at the City of Jesolo Trophy in Jesolo, Italy. She helped the U.S. team win the gold medal and qualified in first place to the uneven bars final. In the final, Locklear took the gold medal with a score of 15.250.

In April, at the 2016 Pacific Rim Gymnastics Championships, Locklear helped the U.S. win the team competition. She also qualified to the uneven bars final and took the gold medal with a score of 15.625.

In June 2016, Locklear competed at the U.S. Secret Classic, where she won the gold medal on uneven bars ahead of the reigning world champion, Kocian, with a score of 15.850, and placed fourth on beam with a score of 14.750.

Later in June, Locklear competed at the P&G Championships in St. Louis, where she posted huge scores on both days on uneven bars: 15.600 on Day 1 and 15.700 on Day 2 for a two-day total of 31.300, edging out Kocian by a combined margin of 0.150 to reclaim the national title. Locklear also performed on balance beam on both days of competition, scoring 14.450 and 14.150 to take eighth place, 0.050 behind Kocian. Locklear was named to the 2016 U.S. National Team and qualified for the Olympic Trials in San Jose, California.

At the 2016 Olympic Trials, Locklear fell on the beam at night one but finished with a score 15.700 on bars night 2. Locklear was chosen as an alternate alongside MyKayla Skinner and Ragan Smith.

==== 2017 ====
Ashton began the 2017 season at the City of Jesolo Trophy in Jesolo, Italy, winning the team gold medal with the U.S. team and the bronze medal on the uneven bars, behind Russia's Elena Eremina and fellow U.S. teammate Riley McCusker.

In late July, Locklear competed at the U.S. Secret Classic, performing on just balance beam. She tied for eighth in that event with Kalyany Steele.

In August, Locklear competed at the P&G Championships in Anaheim, California. Despite competing evidently-downgraded routines on the uneven bars, she placed second on that event, 0.250 of a point behind the event winner Riley McCusker. She also placed tenth on the balance beam.

In September Locklear was selected to represent the United States at the 2017 Artistic Gymnastics World Championships in Montreal alongside Ragan Smith, Morgan Hurd, and Jade Carey. During qualifications Locklear competed on uneven bars and balance beam. She qualified to the uneven bars finals in 7th place with a score of 14.566. During the uneven bars finals, she had an unexpected early mistake resulting in 8th-place finish. Later Locklear clarified that during the uneven bars final she had re-injured her shoulder, resulting in a subpar performance.

==== 2018 ====
After undergoing shoulder surgery in the fall, Locklear relocated to Spring, Texas to train alongside Simone Biles at World Champions Centre. In the summer, she underwent knee surgery and spent the remainder of the year recovering. In July, Locklear confirmed via Instagram that she too was sexually abused by Larry Nassar.

==== 2019 ====
In an interview with French gymnast Juliette Bossu, Locklear announced that she would make her comeback in February at the WOGA Classic and would compete not only on uneven bars and balance beam, but on floor exercise as well, an event she had not competed on since 2013. At the WOGA Classic, Locklear scored 12.350 on uneven bars after falling twice and 12.550 on balance beam. Later that month Locklear competed at the World Champion's National Qualifier where she placed first on uneven bars with a score of 13.450 and tied for fourth on balance beam with a score of 12.600. Her scores did not qualify her to compete at the American or U.S. Classic.

On May 16 Locklear officially announced her retirement from the sport via Twitter.

== Competitive history ==
Competitive history of Ashton Locklear
Year	Event	Team	AA	VT	UB	BB	FX
2013	Nastia Liukin Cup		7				
2014	U.S. Classic				1st place, gold medalist(s)	4	
2014	U.S. Championships				1st place, gold medalist(s)	8	
2014	Pan American Championships	1st place, gold medalist(s)			1st place, gold medalist(s)		
2014	World Championships	1st place, gold medalist(s)			4		
2015	U.S. Championships				2nd place, silver medalist(s)	13	
2016	City of Jesolo Trophy	1st place, gold medalist(s)			1st place, gold medalist(s)		
2016	Pacific Rim Championships	1st place, gold medalist(s)			1st place, gold medalist(s)		
2016	U.S. Classic				1st place, gold medalist(s)	4	
2016	U.S. Championships				1st place, gold medalist(s)	8	
2016	U.S. Olympic Trials				2nd place, silver medalist(s)	13	
2017	City of Jesolo Trophy	1st place, gold medalist(s)			3rd place, bronze medalist(s)		
2017	U.S. Classic					8	
2017	U.S. Championships				2nd place, silver medalist(s)	10	
2017	World Championships				8		
2018	Did not compete						
2019	WOGA Classic				6	6	
2019	WCC National Qualifier				1st place, gold medalist(s)	4	
