= Trinity Thomas =

American artistic gymnast (born 2001)

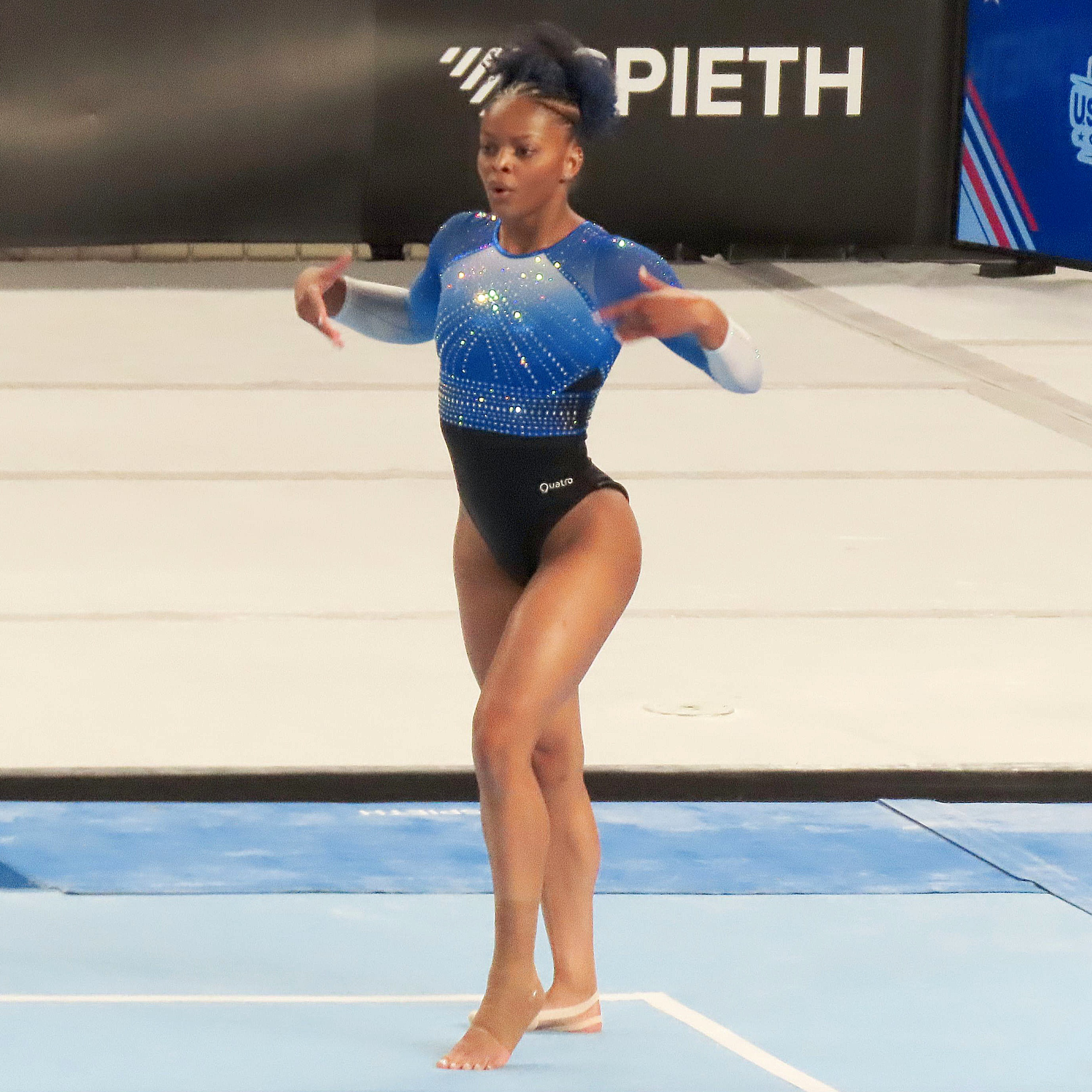
- Thomas at the 2024 U.S. Gymnastics Championships

Personal information
- Full name: Trinity Lemyra Thomas
- Born: April 7, 2001 (age 25) York, Pennsylvania USA
- Height: 5 ft 4 in (163 cm)

Gymnastics career
- Discipline: Women's artistic gymnastics
- Country represented: United States; (2015–2019, 2024)
- College team: Florida Gators (2019–23)
- Club: Prestige Gymnastics
- Head coach: Tony Fatta
Medal record
Representing the United States
Pan American Championships
Gold medal – first place	2018 Lima	Team
Silver medal – second place	2018 Lima	All-around
Silver medal – second place	2018 Lima	Uneven bars
FIG World Cup
Event / 1st / 2nd / 3rd; All-Around World Cup / 0 / 1 / 0
Representing Florida Gators
NCAA Championships
Gold medal – first place	2022 Fort Worth	All-Around
Gold medal – first place	2022 Fort Worth	Uneven Bars
Gold medal – first place	2022 Fort Worth	Floor Exercise
Silver medal – second place	2022 Fort Worth	Team
Silver medal – second place	2023 Fort Worth	Team
Silver medal – second place	2023 Fort Worth	Uneven Bars

Trinity Lemyra Thomas (born April 7, 2001) is an American artistic gymnast and a four-time National Team member (2016–20). She was a member of the gold medal-winning team at the 2018 Pan American Gymnastics Championships, where she also won silver medals in the individual all-around and on the uneven bars, as well as the bronze medalist on balance beam and floor exercise at the 2017 national championships. She was a member of the Florida Gators women's gymnastics team. One of the most successful NCAA gymnasts in history, Thomas finished her collegiate career with a record-tying 28 perfect-10 scores and a record-breaking five Gym Slams (scores of perfect 10 on every apparatus).

== Early gymnastics career ==
=== 2011–2012 ===
Thomas commenced gymnastics training in 2008, at the age of 7 – a relatively late start for an elite-level gymnast. In 2011, training at Skyline Gymnastics in York, she was the Pennsylvania state champion for Level 7 in the all-around and on all four pieces. As a result, she skipped Level 8 to compete as a Level 9 gymnast, placing second at the 2012 Regionals. At the 2012 Level 9 Eastern Championship in Maryland, she was fourth in the all-around; she competed against future teammate Sydney Johnson-Scharpf.

=== 2013–2014 ===
For the 2013 season, Thomas moved to Artistic Sports Academy Plus (ASAP) in Harrisburg, Pennsylvania, and moved up to Level 10; the highest level of the USAG program. She was third at States, ninth at Regionals and, as a result, qualified to the J.O. NIT competition. At the competition, held in Minneapolis, Minnesota, Thomas finished fourth in the all-around and was the National Champion on floor.

In 2014, following her move to Prestige Gymnastics in Lancaster, she only competed three events at the Pennsylvania State Championships.

== Elite gymnastics career ==
In February 2015, Thomas qualified as a Junior International Elite gymnast through her performance in the WOGA Classic Elite Qualifier.

=== 2017 ===
Thomas became age-eligible for senior-level competition in 2017. She made her senior international debut at the 2017 City of Jesolo Trophy where she helped the USA finish first. In July Thomas competed at the 2017 U.S. Classic. She only competed on uneven bars and balance where she placed third on each. Later in the summer Thomas competed at the 2017 U.S. National Gymnastics Championships where she placed fourth in the all-around behind Ragan Smith, Jordan Chiles, and Riley McCusker, sixth on bars, and third on beam and floor. As a result, she was named to the senior national team and invited to participate in the Worlds Team Selection Camp. After the two days of trials, Chiles and Thomas were selected as the non-traveling alternates for the 2017 Artistic Gymnastics World Championships.

=== 2018 ===
In the beginning of the year Thomas was selected to compete at the Tokyo World Cup, where she won silver behind Mai Murakami of Japan. In April she announced her commitment to the University of Florida and their gymnastics team. In August Thomas competed at the 2018 U.S. National Gymnastics Championships where she placed eighth in the all-around, fourth on bars, and sixth on beam and floor, and was once again named to the senior national team. On August 20, 2018, Thomas was named to the team to compete at the Pan American Championships alongside Grace McCallum, Jade Carey, Kara Eaker, and Shilese Jones. There she won gold in the team final and silver in the all-around and on uneven bars. Thomas was invited to attend the Worlds Team Selection Camp but declined.

=== 2019 ===
In 2019 Thomas became one of the few gymnasts to train both NCAA and elite gymnastics simultaneously. Thomas competed at the 2019 GK US Classic in July, opting to only compete on uneven bars and balance beam. On the two events, she placed sixth and seventh, respectively.

At U.S. National Championships Thomas competed in the all-around, where she finished in ninth place. She also placed fourth on uneven bars behind Sunisa Lee, Morgan Hurd, and Simone Biles, tenth on balance beam, and fifteenth on floor exercise. As a result, she was added to the national team for the fourth time.

=== 2023–2024 ===
In July 2023 Thomas announced her plans to pursue a berth on the U.S. team for 2024 Olympics Games in Paris. She made her elite comeback at the 2024 Winter Cup where she placed fourth in the all-around and second on uneven bars.

== Collegiate gymnastics career ==
=== 2018–2019 season ===
Thomas began competing as a collegiate gymnast for the Florida Gators in the 2018–2019 season. At the 2019 SEC Championships Thomas placed first on vault, second of floor exercise behind Sarah Finnegan of Louisiana State third in the all-around behind Finnegan and Lexi Graber of Alabama. She helped Florida place second overall. During the Regional Finals, the Florida Gators lost, being upset by the Denver Pioneers and the Oregon State Beavers, and thus did not qualify as a team to compete at the 2019 NCAA Championships. Thomas, however, qualified as an individual on floor exercise and uneven bars. At the 2019 NCAA Championships Thomas placed seventh on floor exercise and 30th on uneven bars.

=== 2019–2020 season ===
On January 24, in a meet against Louisiana State, while performing on the uneven bars Thomas earned her first collegiate perfect 10.0. The following week she earned her second perfect 10, this time on balance beam, in a meet against Denver and Iowa State. On March 7, in a meet against Penn State, Thomas earned a perfect 10 on floor exercise; she was the second of two gymnasts that season to be awarded the perfect score, the first was Gracie Kramer. Due to the COVID-19 pandemic in the United States, the NCAA cancelled the remainder of the 2020 season on March 12. Thomas was nominated for the Honda Sports Award alongside Kyla Ross (who won the award), Maggie Nichols, and Lexy Ramler.

=== 2020–2021 season ===
Thomas announced her retirement from elite gymnastics in May, citing that her ankle injuries earlier in the year has hindered her training for the 2020 Olympic Games and that she would instead focus on rehabbing her injury and continuing to compete at the NCAA level.

=== 2021–2022 season ===
On January 16, in a meet against Alabama, Thomas earned a perfect 10 on both vault and floor exercise. By earning a 10 on vault, Thomas became the 12th NCAA gymnast and third Florida Gator after Bridget Sloan and Alex McMurtry to earn a gym slam (a perfect 10 on all four apparatuses). She is also the only NCAA gymnast to earn a perfect 10 on each apparatus at least 3 times.

=== 2022–2023 season ===
During the season opener quad meet versus West Virginia, Ball State, and Lindenwood on January 6, Thomas earned a perfect 10 on the balance beam, joining Bridget Sloan as the only Gators to open a season with a perfect mark. On January 27 Thomas scored a perfect ten on vault in a meet against Georgia. In doing so she earned her fourth career gym slam. At the 2023 NCAA Gymnastics Finals, Thomas tied the record for most perfect 10 scores in NCAA history with her 28th perfect 10 on vault.

=== Career perfect 10.0 ===
Season	Date	Event	Meet
2020	January 24, 2020	Uneven Bars	Florida vs LSU
2020	February 7, 2020	Balance Beam	Florida vs Denver & Iowa State
2020	February 14, 2020	Balance Beam	Florida vs Auburn
2020	March 7, 2020	Floor Exercise	Florida @ Penn State
2021	February 12, 2021	Floor Exercise	Florida @ LSU
2021	February 26, 2021	Uneven Bars	Florida vs Auburn
2021	February 26, 2021	Floor Exercise	Florida vs Auburn
2021	April 2, 2021	Uneven Bars	NCAA Regionals
2022	January 16, 2022	Vault	Florida vs Alabama
2022	January 16, 2022	Floor Exercise	Florida vs Alabama
2022	January 28, 2022	Balance Beam	Florida vs Arkansas
2022	February 18, 2022	Floor Exercise	Florida @ Kentucky
2022	February 25, 2022	Floor Exercise	Florida vs Oklahoma
2022	March 4, 2022	Vault	Florida @ Auburn
2022	March 31, 2022	Floor Exercise	NCAA regional semifinals
2022	March 31, 2022	Uneven Bars	NCAA regional semifinals
2022	April 2, 2022	Floor Exercise	NCAA Regional Finals
2022	April 2, 2022	Vault	NCAA Regional Finals
2022	April 14, 2022	Floor Exercise	NCAA National semifinals
2022	April 16, 2022	Floor Exercise	NCAA National Finals
2023	January 6, 2023	Balance Beam	Florida vs West Virginia, Ball St, Lindenwood
2023	January 13, 2023	Floor Exercise	Florida vs Auburn
2023	January 27, 2023	Vault	Florida vs Georgia
2023	February 10, 2023	Balance Beam	Florida vs Missouri
2023	February 17, 2023	Balance Beam	Florida @ LSU
2023	March 18, 2023	Uneven Bars	SEC Championships
2023	March 18, 2023	Floor Exercise	SEC Championships
2023	April 15, 2023	Vault	NCAA Championship Final
Totals by event
Vault		5	
Uneven Bars		5	
Balance Beam		6	
Floor Exercise		12	
Totals by year
2019		0	
2020		4	
2021		4	
2022		12	
2023		8	

=== NCAA Regular season ranking ===
Season	All-Around	Vault	Uneven Bars	Balance Beam	Floor Exercise
2019	5th	17th	4th	14th	2nd
2020 (Note: The season was cancelled after the 10th week of competition due to the coronavirus pandemic.)	2nd	14th	4th	2nd	1st
2021	1st	7th	1st	10th	2nd
2022	N/A	1st	5th	3rd	1st
2023	3rd	14th	2nd	9th	2nd

== Non-competitive career ==
After Thomas' NCAA eligibility ended, she continued working with the Florida Gators as a student assistant coach for the 2023-2024 season. In 2025, Thomas began commentating as a gymnastics analyst for ESPN.

== Personal life ==
Thomas was born on April 7, 2001, in York, Pennsylvania to parents Titania and Tisen Thomas. Her father, Tisen, was a wide receiver for Penn State University's Nittany Lions football team from 1990 to 1993. She has four siblings: Tesia, a former gymnast, volleyball player and swimmer now competing in track and field at Penn State, University Park, Taleyn, a gymnast, diver and pole vaulter, Tristen, a gymnast and swimmer, and Tayvon, an offensive and defensive football player and swimmer.

In 2022, Thomas obtained her bachelor's degree in Applied Physiology & Kinesiology at the University of Florida. She continued her education at the University of Florida and holds two master's degrees: a master's in Health Education & Behavior and a master's in Entrepreneurship.

== Competitive history ==
Competitive history of Trinity Thomas at the junior level
Year	Event	Team	AA	VT	UB	BB	FX
2015	US Classic		16	13	24	11	15
2015	P&G National Championships					5	
2016	City of Jesolo Trophy		5				1st place, gold medalist(s)
2016	US Classic					42	
2016	P&G National Championships		6	10	11	6	7

Competitive history of Trinity Thomas at the senior level
Year	Event	Team	AA	VT	UB	BB	FX
2017	City of Jesolo Trophy	1st place, gold medalist(s)					
2017	American Classic				1st place, gold medalist(s)	2nd place, silver medalist(s)	
2017	US Classic				3rd place, bronze medalist(s)	3rd place, bronze medalist(s)	
2017	P&G National Championships		4		6	3rd place, bronze medalist(s)	3rd place, bronze medalist(s)
2018	Tokyo World Cup		2nd place, silver medalist(s)				
2018	U.S. National Championships		8		4	6	6
2018	Pan American Championships	1st place, gold medalist(s)	2nd place, silver medalist(s)		2nd place, silver medalist(s)		
2019	U.S. Classic				6	7	
2019	U.S. National Championships		9		4	10	15
2019	Worlds Team Selection Camp		12	9	8	10	12
2024	Winter Cup		4		2nd place, silver medalist(s)	9	11
2024	U.S. Classic				3rd place, bronze medalist(s)	37	
2024	U.S. National Championships				36		35

Competitive history of Trinity Thomas at the NCAA level
Year	Event	Team	AA	VT	UB	BB	FX
2019	SEC Championships	2nd place, silver medalist(s)	3rd place, bronze medalist(s)	1st place, gold medalist(s)	15		2nd place, silver medalist(s)
2019	NCAA Championships						7
2020	SEC Championships	Canceled due to the COVID-19 pandemic in the USA					
2020	NCAA Championships	Canceled due to the COVID-19 pandemic in the USA					
2021	SEC Championships	3rd place, bronze medalist(s)			10		
2021	NCAA Championships	4	11			10	13
2022	SEC Championships	1st place, gold medalist(s)	1st place, gold medalist(s)	1st place, gold medalist(s)	2nd place, silver medalist(s)	7	1st place, gold medalist(s)
2022	NCAA Championships	2nd place, silver medalist(s)	1st place, gold medalist(s)	4	1st place, gold medalist(s)	4	1st place, gold medalist(s)
2023	SEC Championships	1st place, gold medalist(s)	1st place, gold medalist(s)	12	1st place, gold medalist(s)	5	1st place, gold medalist(s)
2023	NCAA Championships	2nd place, silver medalist(s)		5	2nd place, silver medalist(s)		
