= Ragan Smith =

American artistic gymnast

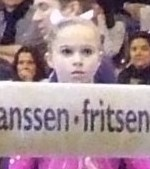
- Smith at the 2014 City of Jesolo Trophy

Personal information
- Born: August 8, 2000 (age 26) Snellville, Georgia
- Height: 4 ft 11 in (150 cm)

Gymnastics career
- Discipline: Women's artistic gymnastics
- Country represented: United States; (2014–2018)
- College team: Oklahoma Sooners (2020–24)
- Club: Texas Dreams Gymnastics
- Head coach: K.J. Kindler
- Former coaches: Elena Piskun; Kim Zmeskal
- Choreographer: Kim Zmeskal; Dominic Zito
- Retired: April 18, 2024
Medal record
Representing the United States
World Championships
Gold medal – first place	2018 Doha	Team
Pacific Rim Championships
Gold medal – first place	2016 Everett	Team
Gold medal – first place	2016 Everett	Balance Beam
FIG World Cup
Event / 1st / 2nd / 3rd; All-Around World Cup / 1 / 0 / 0
Representing Oklahoma Sooners
NCAA Championships
Gold medal – first place	2022 Fort Worth	Team
Gold medal – first place	2023 Fort Worth	Team
Silver medal – second place	2021 Fort Worth	Team
Bronze medal – third place	2021 Fort Worth	Balance Beam
Bronze medal – third place	2024 Fort Worth	Balance Beam

Ragan Smith
Current position
- Title: Assistant coach
- Team: Iowa State Cyclones
- Conference: Big 12

Biographical details
- Education: University of Oklahoma

Coaching career (HC unless noted)
- 2025–2026: Iowa State (Asst.)

Ragan Elizabeth Smith (born August 8, 2000) is a retired American gymnast and current assistant coach. She is a five-time member of the US National Team (2014–2019) and competed for the University of Oklahoma in collegiate gymnastics from 2020 to 2024. She is the 2017 United States national all-around champion and was an alternate for the 2016 Olympic team.

== Personal life ==
Smith was born in Snellville, Georgia, to Michael and Kerry Smith. She has two younger brothers. Her mother was a gymnastics coach. Smith began gymnastics in 2004. Smith lived in Lewisville, Texas for six years, and she currently lives in Norman, Oklahoma.

== Junior gymnastics career ==
=== 2013 ===
Smith qualified for Junior International Elite status in 2013 and advanced to the 2013 Secret U.S. Classic in Hoffman Estates, Illinois. She placed 23rd in the all-around and advanced to U.S. Nationals later in the month, where she finished 17th all-around.

=== 2014 ===
Smith attended her first international assignment in March 2014, after her addition to the U.S. National Team, at the 2014 City of Jesolo Trophy in Venice, Italy. She contributed an all-around score of 52.650. In August 2014, Smith competed at the 2014 Secret U.S. Classic and scored 54.450, finishing thirteenth in the all-around and first on floor, advancing to the U.S. Nationals, where she placed seventh in the all-around with a two-day combined total of 110.750 and second on beam and floor with scores of 29.000 and 29.150, respectively.

=== 2015 ===
In March, Smith once again attended the City of Jesolo Trophy. In qualifications, which also served as an all-around/team final, Smith placed 5th with a score of 56.100 and made both the vault and floor finals. She scored a 14.350 on vault, earning a third-place finish, and 14.250 on floor, placing second.

Smith competed in the Secret U.S. Classic, placing 1st on the floor exercise, as well as 2nd in the all-around and 3rd on vault. In August, Smith attended the 2015 US Nationals. She came in 3rd all-around with a two-day combined score of 116.450 and won both balance beam and floor. On December 19, 2015, Smith committed to the University of Oklahoma and the Sooners program.

== Senior gymnastics career ==
=== 2016 ===
Smith's senior debut came at the 2016 City of Jesolo Trophy in March, where she finished second on beam, floor, and the all-around. In April, she competed at the Pacific Rim Championships, winning balance beam with a score of 15.225. At the Secret U.S. Classic, Smith finished fifth on beam and tied for sixth on bars. At the U.S. Olympic Trials in San Jose on July 10, 2016, she scored 15.3 on the balance beam and finished second on the event. On July 10, Smith was named as an alternate to the 2016 Olympic team, alongside Ashton Locklear and MyKayla Skinner.

=== 2017 ===
On March 4, Smith won the gold medal ahead of Japanese Olympian Asuka Teramoto at the American Cup in Newark, New Jersey. In July, Smith competed at the U.S. Classic on uneven bars and balance beam only. She took first place on both events.

On August 20, Smith won the 2017 U.S. National Gymnastics Championships all-around title with a two-day combined score of 115.250, over three points ahead of silver medalist Jordan Chiles. She also placed first on floor exercise ahead of Jade Carey and Trinity Thomas, first on balance beam ahead of Riley McCusker and Thomas, and third on uneven bars behind McCusker and Locklear. She was named to the national team for the fourth consecutive year.

On September 20, Smith was selected to represent the United States at the 2017 Artistic Gymnastics World Championships in Montreal alongside Carey, Locklear, and Morgan Hurd. During qualifications Smith qualified to the all-around final in second place behind Mai Murakami of Japan despite an uncharacteristic fall on the balance beam. Smith also qualified to the floor exercise final in first with a score of 14.433, ahead of Murakami and teammate Carey. She was arguably the favorite to win the all-around title, but minutes before her first rotation on vault she injured her ankle during warmups and withdrew from the all-around final. This was only one of many injuries sustained by major contenders over the course of the championships, with Kohei Uchimura of Japan, Rebeca Andrade of Brazil and Larisa Iordache of Romania all withdrawing from the competition due to injury. Oksana Chusovitina of Uzbekistan, the athlete representative, mentioned that the new podium training format only allowed the gymnasts a few minutes on each piece, not giving the gymnasts a sufficient amount of time to get used to the equipment, and suggested this as a reason for a much larger number of mistakes and injuries than usual. Smith's injury also forced her to withdraw from the floor exercise event final. Smith's recovery included extensive physical therapy and rehab as she chose to avoid the risks of surgery.

=== 2018 ===
In her comeback meet, Smith competed at the City of Jesolo Trophy in April. The US did not field a team, but Smith and club teammate Emma Malabuyo competed as individuals. Smith won silver in the all-around, balance beam, and uneven bars. She competed at the 2018 U.S. Classic in late July. She only competed on vault, balance beam, and uneven bars. She finished third on balance beam.

Marred by lingering torn ligaments in her ankle, broken toes, and mental struggles at the 2018 U.S Championships in August, Smith finished 10th in the all-around, 8th on vault, 8th on beam, tied for 11th on bars, and 11th on floor over the cumulative two day competition. She was not selected for the eight member national team for 2018.

In October, Smith participated in the Worlds Team Selection Camp. During the competition, she placed fifth in the all-around, third on balance beam behind Kara Eaker and Riley McCusker, fourth on vault and floor exercise, and eighth on uneven bars. The following day she was named to the team to compete at the 2018 World Championships alongside Biles, Morgan Hurd, McCusker, Grace McCallum, and Eaker. As a result of making the World Championship team, Smith was added back onto the National Team. While in Doha she was chosen as the alternate. Although she did not compete at the World Championships, she still earned a gold medal alongside her teammates.

In December Smith officially signed with the Oklahoma Sooners women's gymnastics program, starting in the 2020–21 season.

=== 2019 ===
In 2019, Smith attended the U.S. Women's National Team camps in January, February, and May but was noticeably absent from the June camp, despite all other National Team members being in attendance, sparking rumors that she was going to attend the University of Oklahoma in the fall. In July, Smith confirmed on Instagram that she had decided to join the Oklahoma Sooners for the 2019–2020 season, presumably ending her elite career as she was not on the roster to compete at the upcoming U.S. Classic.

== NCAA career ==
Smith announced that she would be joining the Oklahoma Sooners women's gymnastics team for the 2019–2020 season, instead of deferring for a year like she had originally planned. She made her NCAA debut at the 2020 Collegiate Challenge where she competed the all-around and helped Oklahoma finish first, recording the highest score on balance beam for her team.

On February 6, 2022, in a meet against Texas Women's University, Smith earned her first collegiate perfect ten on the balance beam.

=== Career perfect 10.0 ===
Season	Date	Event	Meet
2022	February 6, 2022	Balance beam	Oklahoma vs TWU
2022	February 11, 2022	Balance beam	Oklahoma vs George Washington
2023	January 29, 2023	Balance beam	Oklahoma @ Denver
2023	March 18, 2023	Balance beam	Big 12 Championships
2023	March 30, 2023	Balance beam	Norman Regional Semifinal
2024	February 17, 2024	Balance beam	Metroplex Challenge
2024	February 23, 2024	Balance beam	Oklahoma vs West Virginia
2024	March 1, 2024	Balance beam	Oklahoma vs Michigan
2024	March 3, 2024	Balance beam	Oklahoma @ TWU
2024	March 23, 2024	Balance beam	Big 12 Championships
2024	April 4, 2024	Balance beam	Michigan Regional Semifinal

=== NCAA Regular season ranking ===
Season	All-Around	Vault	Uneven Bars	Balance Beam	Floor Exercise
2020 (Note: The season was cancelled after the 10th week of competition due to the coronavirus pandemic.)	N/A	N/A	7th	13th	45th
2021	N/A	N/A	55th	19th	37th
2022	N/A	N/A	33rd	1st	12th
2023	N/A	N/A	21st	5th	60th
2024	N/A	N/A	18th	1st	27th

== Coaching career ==
Smith was hired as an assistant coach for the Iowa State Cyclones women's gymnastics team, starting in the 2025–2026 season. The program was discontinued in 2026.

== Selected competitive skills ==
Apparatus	Name	Description	Difficulty (Note: Valid for the 2017–2020 Code of Points)	Performed
Vault	Baitova	Yurchenko entry, laid out salto backwards with two twists	5.4	2016–18
Uneven Bars	Inbar 1/1	Inbar Stalder to full (1/1) pirouette	E	2016–18
Uneven Bars	Ricna	Stalder to counter reversed straddled hecht over high bar	E	2016–18
Uneven Bars	Downie	Stalder backward on high bar with counter-pike reverse hecht over bar	F	2017–18
Balance Beam	Double Pike	Dismount: Double piked salto backwards	E	2016–18
Balance Beam	Front Pike	Piked Salto Forwards	E	2017
Balance Beam	Layout	Laid out salto backwards with legs together (to two feet)	E	2016–18
Balance Beam	Mitchell	1080° (3/1) turn in tuck stand on one leg	E	2018
Balance Beam	Shishova	Full-twisting (1/1) tucked salto backwards	F	2016–18
Balance Beam	Patterson	Dismount: Tucked Arabian double front dismount	G	2016
Floor Exercise	Andreasen	Tucked Arabian double salto forward	E	2016–18
Floor Exercise	Triple Twist	Triple-twisting (3/1) laid-out salto backward	E	2016–18
Floor Exercise	Double Layout	Double laid out salto backwards	F	2016–18

== Competitive history ==
Year	Event	Team	AA	VT	UB	BB	FX
HOPEs
2012	U.S. Classic (HOPEs)		2nd place, silver medalist(s)	2nd place, silver medalist(s)	7	3rd place, bronze medalist(s)	1st place, gold medalist(s)
Junior
2013	U.S. Classic					6	
2013	U.S. National Championships		17			10	8
2014	City of Jesolo Trophy	1st place, gold medalist(s)	8				
2014	U.S. Classic		13		12		1st place, gold medalist(s)
2014	U.S. National Championships		7	8	29	2nd place, silver medalist(s)	2nd place, silver medalist(s)
2015	City of Jesolo Trophy	1st place, gold medalist(s)	5	3rd place, bronze medalist(s)			2nd place, silver medalist(s)
2015	U.S. Classic		2nd place, silver medalist(s)	3rd place, bronze medalist(s)	7	4	1st place, gold medalist(s)
2015	U.S. National Championships		3rd place, bronze medalist(s)	6	7	1st place, gold medalist(s)	1st place, gold medalist(s)
Senior
2016	City of Jesolo Trophy	1st place, gold medalist(s)	2nd place, silver medalist(s)			2nd place, silver medalist(s)	2nd place, silver medalist(s)
2016	Pacific Rim Championships	1st place, gold medalist(s)				1st place, gold medalist(s)	
2016	U.S. Classic				6	5	
2016	U.S. National Championships		8		11	5	13
2016	U.S. Olympic Trials		5	11	10	2nd place, silver medalist(s)	6
2016	Olympic Games	(Note: Smith was the Team USA alternate.)					
2017	American Cup		1st place, gold medalist(s)				
2017	U.S. Classic				1st place, gold medalist(s)	1st place, gold medalist(s)	
2017	P&G National Championships		1st place, gold medalist(s)		3rd place, bronze medalist(s)	1st place, gold medalist(s)	1st place, gold medalist(s)
2017	World Championships (Note: Smith qualified to the All-Around and Floor Exercise finals in 2nd and 1st respectively but had to withdraw from both due to an injury sustained before the AA final.)		WD				WD
2018	City of Jesolo Trophy		2nd place, silver medalist(s)		2nd place, silver medalist(s)	2nd place, silver medalist(s)	
2018	U.S. Classic				11	3rd place, bronze medalist(s)	
2018	U.S. National Championships		10		11	8	11
2018	Worlds Team Selection Camp		5	4	8	3rd place, bronze medalist(s)	4
2018	World Championships	(gold)					
NCAA
2020	Big-12 Championships	Canceled due to the COVID-19 pandemic in the USA					
2020	NCAA Championships	Canceled due to the COVID-19 pandemic in the USA					
2021	Big-12 Championships	2nd place, silver medalist(s)			3rd place, bronze medalist(s)	1st place, gold medalist(s)	
2021	NCAA Championships	2nd place, silver medalist(s)				3rd place, bronze medalist(s)	
2022	Big-12 Championships	1st place, gold medalist(s)			1st place, gold medalist(s)	24	1st place, gold medalist(s)
2022	NCAA Championships	1st place, gold medalist(s)			26	12	7
2023	NCAA Championships	1st place, gold medalist(s)					
2024	Big-12 Championships	1st place, gold medalist(s)			3rd place, bronze medalist(s)	1st place, gold medalist(s)	7
2024	NCAA Championships	6				3rd place, bronze medalist(s)	

== Floor music ==
Year	Music Title
2016–17	The Addams Family Theme
2017–18	These Boots Are Made for Walkin'
