= 2016 U.S. National Gymnastics Championships =

2016 P&G U.S. National Gymnastics Championships
- Venue: XL Center (sr. men); Chaifetz Arena (women & jr. men)
- Location: Hartford, Connecticut (sr. men); St. Louis, Missouri (women & jr. men)
- Dates: June 3–5, 2016 (sr. men); June 23–26, 2016 (women & jr. men)

The 2016 P&G U.S. National Gymnastics Championships was the 53rd edition of the U.S. National Gymnastics Championships and was held June 3–5, 2016, at the XL Center in Hartford, Connecticut, for senior men and June 23–26, 2016, at the Chaifetz Arena in Saint Louis, Missouri, for women and junior men.

== Medal summary ==
Event	Gold	Silver	Bronze
Senior Men
Individual all-around	Sam Mikulak	Chris Brooks	Jacob Dalton
Floor	Jacob Dalton	Paul Ruggeri III	Eddie Penev
Pommel horse	Eddie Penev	Sam Mikulak	Ellis Mannon
Rings	Donnell Whittenburg	C. J. Maestas	Jacob Dalton
Vault	Jacob Dalton Matthew Wenske	—	Paul Ruggeri III
Parallel bars	Chris Brooks	Sam Mikulak	Akash Modi
Horizontal bar	Paul Ruggeri III	Chris Brooks	John Orozco
Senior Women
Individual all-around	Simone Biles	Aly Raisman	Laurie Hernandez
Vault	Simone Biles	MyKayla Skinner	—
Uneven bars	Ashton Locklear	Madison Kocian	Laurie Hernandez
Balance beam	Simone Biles	Aly Raisman	Laurie Hernandez
Floor	Simone Biles	Aly Raisman	Laurie Hernandez MyKayla Skinner
Junior Women
Individual all-around	Maile O'Keefe	Riley McCusker	Gabby Perea
Vault	Chae Campbell	Madeleine Johnston	Shilese Jones
Uneven bars	Gabby Perea	Riley McCusker	Morgan Hurd
Balance beam	Maile O'Keefe	Riley McCusker	Shania Adams
Floor	Maile O'Keefe	Riley McCusker	Shilese Jones
Junior Men (17–18)
Individual all-around	Matt Wenske	Bailey Perez	Jordan Kovach
Junior Men (15–16)
Individual all-around	Shane Wiskus	Bennet Huang	Alexei Vernyi
