= Gabby Perea =

American artistic gymnast (born 2002)

- Full name: Gabrielle Perea
- Born: January 1, 2002 (age 24) Naperville, Illinois, U.S.

Gymnastics career
- Discipline: Women's artistic gymnastics
- Country represented: United States (2016–19 (USA))
- College team: California Golden Bears
- Training location: Carol Stream, Illinois
- Club: Legacy Elite, LLC
- Head coach: Wu Jiani
- Assistant coach: Li Yuejiu
Medal record
Representing the California Bears
NCAA Championships
Silver medal – second place	2024 Fort Worth	Team

Gabrielle "Gabby" Perea (born January 1, 2002) is an American artistic gymnast. An elite gymnast since 2013, she was named to the National Team in March 2016; she received her inaugural international assignment at that time also, at the 2016 L'International Gymnix competition where she won the all-around title. Later in March, she attended the 2016 City of Jesolo Trophy competition with Emma Malabuyo, Jordan Chiles and Trinity Thomas, where she placed third in the all-around.

== Career ==
2019

Perea competed at 2019 City of Jesolo Trophy, alongside teammates Shilese Jones, Emma Malabuyo, and Sunisa Lee, where the four women took the team gold. Individually, Perea placed thirteenth in the all-around competition.

At the 2019 GK US Classic, Perea finished thirteenth in the all-around with a score of 52.050. She placed seventh on bars, twentieth on beam, and fifteenth on floor.

At nationals, Perea finished fifteenth in the all-around. She also finished tenth on bars, sixteenth on beam, and seventeenth on floor. She was not added to the national team.
