= Rachael Riley =

Canadian artistic gymnast

- Born: 2004 (age 21–22) Anqing, China

Gymnastics career
- Discipline: Women's artistic gymnastics
- Country represented: Canada (2018–21)
- College team: Rutgers Scarlet Knights (2023–26)
- Club: Bluewater Gymnastics
- Head coach: Pilar Maldonado

Rachael Riley (born 2004) is a Canadian artistic gymnast and member of the Canadian national gymnastics team.

== Early life ==
Riley was born in Anqing, China in 2004. She attended St. Patrick's Catholic High School in Sarnia, Ontario, Canada.

== Gymnastics career ==
=== Junior ===
==== 2017 ====
Riley competed at the Canadian Championships in the Novice division where she placed first in the all-around and on vault and second on floor exercise. Riley competed at Elite Gym Massilia where she placed twenty-fourth in the open all-around. She also competed at the Top Gym where she placed twenty-seventh in the all-around, seventh on the balance beam and in the team final, and tenth on vault.

==== 2018 ====
In February Riley competed at Elite Canada where she placed fourth in the all-around behind Emma Spence, Imogen Paterson, and Kyra Cato. During event finals she won gold on vault, placed fifth on balance beam, and fourth on floor exercise. At the Canadian Championships in May Riley placed fourth in the all-around behind Zoé Allaire-Bourgie, Spence, and Quinn Skrupa. As a result she was added to the junior national team for the first time. In November Riley competed at Elite Gym Massilia where she placed thirteenth in the all-around and won silver on vault behind Lilia Akhaimova. She ended the season competing at the Top Gym Tournament where she placed tenth in the all-around, second on vault behind Silviana Sfiringu, and eighth on uneven bars.

==== 2019 ====
Riley competed at Elite Canada where she placed twelfth but recorded the highest score on vault. In March she competed at the 2019 L'International Gymnix. She helped Canada win the bronze medal behind the United States and Belgium. Individually Riley won bronze on vault behind Skye Blakely and Olivia Greaves.

=== Senior ===
==== 2020 ====
Riley turned senior in 2020 and was scheduled to make her senior debut at Elite Canada but had to withdraw from the competition due to illness. She made her debut at the 2020 L'International Gymnix competition where she was part of one of three Canadian teams. Her team finished sixth in the team final and Riley did not qualify to any individual event finals. Riley was set to compete at a friendly competition in Indianapolis but that was later canceled due to the ongoing coronavirus pandemic.

==== 2021 ====
Riley returned to competition at the Koper Challenge Cup in September. While there she qualified to both the vault and balance beam finals; she placed seventh on both.

== Competitive history ==
Year	Event	Team	AA	VT	UB	BB	FX
Espoir
2017	Canadian Championships (novice)		1st place, gold medalist(s)	1st place, gold medalist(s)			2nd place, silver medalist(s)
2017	Elite Gym Massilia		24				
2017	Top Gym	7	27	10		7	
Junior
2018	Elite Canada		4	1st place, gold medalist(s)		5	4
2018	Canadian Championships		4				
2018	Elite Gym Massilia		13	2nd place, silver medalist(s)			
2018	Top Gym Tournament		10	2nd place, silver medalist(s)	8		
2019	Elite Canada		12				
2019	International Gymnix	3rd place, bronze medalist(s)	16	3rd place, bronze medalist(s)			
Senior
2020	International Gymnix	6					
2021	Koper Challenge Cup			7		7	
