= Kara Eaker =

American artistic gymnast (born 2002)

- Full name: Kara Eaker
- Born: November 7, 2002 (age 24) Jiangxi, China

Gymnastics career
- Discipline: Women's artistic gymnastics
- Country represented: United States; (2017–2022)
- College team: Utah Utes (2022–2023); Georgia Bulldogs (2025–2026)
- Gym: Great American Gymnastics Express
- Former coaches: Al Fong; Tom Farden
- Retired: October 20, 2023
Medal record
Representing United States
Women's artistic gymnastics
World Championships
Gold medal – first place	2018 Doha	Team
Gold medal – first place	2019 Stuttgart	Team
Pan American Games
Gold medal – first place	2019 Lima	Team
Gold medal – first place	2019 Lima	Balance Beam
Silver medal – second place	2019 Lima	Floor Exercise
Pan American Championships
Gold medal – first place	2018 Lima	Team
Gold medal – first place	2018 Lima	Balance Beam
Bronze medal – third place	2018 Lima	Floor Exercise
Representing Utah Red Rocks
NCAA Championships
Bronze medal – third place	2022 Fort Worth	Team
Bronze medal – third place	2023 Fort Worth	Team

Kara Eaker (born November 7, 2002) is an American artistic gymnast. On the balance beam she is the 2018 Pan American and 2019 Pan American Games champion and a two-time United States national silver medalist (2018, 2019). On floor exercise she is the 2019 Pan American Games silver medalist and the 2018 Pan American bronze medalist. She was a member of the American teams that won gold at the 2018 and 2019 World Championships, the 2019 Pan American Games, and the 2018 Pan American Championships. She was an alternate for the 2020 Olympic team.

== Early life ==
Eaker was born in Jiangxi, China as Kara Ming. She was adopted by her family in 2003 and has since resided with them in Missouri.

== Elite gymnastics career ==
=== 2017 ===
Eaker competed at the 2017 U.S. Classic, where she placed third on balance beam and fifth in the all-around in the junior division. She later competed at the 2017 National Championships, where she placed first on balance beam (ahead of Maile O'Keefe and Adeline Kenlin), third in the all-around, fourth on floor exercise, and fifth on uneven bars. She was then named to the Junior National Team.

=== 2018 ===
Eaker turned senior in 2018. She competed at the American Classic, where she placed first on balance beam, second on floor exercise, and fourth in the all-around. Later in the summer, she competed at the 2018 U.S. Classic, where she placed fifth on balance beam after falling off. At the National Championships Eaker finished seventh in the all-around, second on balance beam behind Simone Biles, fifth on floor exercise, and ninth on uneven bars. As a result of her performance, she was added to the senior national team. The following day, Eaker was named to the team to compete at the Pan American Championships in Lima, Peru alongside Grace McCallum, Trinity Thomas, Jade Carey, and Shilese Jones. On the first day of competition, Eaker won the gold medal on balance beam and the bronze on floor exercise. In the team competition, Eaker contributed on these two events toward the United States' gold-medal-winning performance.

In October, Eaker participated in the Worlds Team Selection Camp. During the competition, she placed first on the balance beam, sixth in the all-around, eighth on vault, ninth on uneven bars, and fifth on floor exercise. The following day, she was named to the team to compete at the 2018 World Championships alongside Simone Biles, Morgan Hurd, Grace McCallum, Riley McCusker, and alternate Ragan Smith. During qualifications Eaker qualified second to the balance beam final, behind Biles. The US also qualified in first to the team final. During the team final, Eaker competed on only balance beam. She contributed 14.333, the highest beam score of the night from any competitor, towards the USA's team total. The American team won gold with a score of 171.629, 8.766 points ahead of second place Russia. Although she was favored for a medal in the balance beam final, she placed sixth after falling on her mount.

=== 2019 ===
In February, Eaker was named to the team to compete at the 2019 International Gymnix in Montreal alongside Alyona Shchennikova, Sloane Blakely, and Aleah Finnegan. While there, she won gold in the team final, individual all-around, and on balance beam and placed fifth in the uneven bar final.

In June, after the conclusion of the American Classic, Eaker was named as one of the eight athletes being considered for the team to compete at the 2019 Pan American Games along with Sloane Blakely, Aleah Finnegan, Morgan Hurd, Shilese Jones, Sunisa Lee, Riley McCusker, and Leanne Wong.

At the 2019 GK US Classic, Eaker placed fourth in the all-around behind Simone Biles, McCusker, and Grace McCallum. She also placed first on balance beam and fourth on floor exercise behind Biles, McCallum, and Jade Carey. After the competition, she was named to the team to compete at the Pan American Games alongside Finnegan, Hurd, McCusker, and Wong.

At the Pan American Games Eaker competed on all four events, contributing scores on vault, balance beam, and floor exercise towards the team's gold-medal-winning performance. Individually, Eaker qualified for the balance beam final in first and for the all-around and floor exercise finals in second, both behind McCusker. She placed sixth on uneven bars but did not advance to the final due to teammates McCusker and Wong scoring higher. During the all-around final, Eaker placed fourth behind Ellie Black of Canada, McCusker, and Flávia Saraiva of Brazil due to falls on both the balance beam and floor exercise. During event finals, Eaker won gold on balance beam with a score of 15.266, finishing 1.7 points ahead of Black, who won the silver, and won silver on floor exercise behind Brooklyn Moors of Canada and ahead of Saraiva.

At the 2019 U.S. National Championships, Eaker competed all four events on the first day of competition but fell off the balance beam and ended the night in eleventh place. On the second night, she performed cleanly and ended up finishing in tenth place but won silver on the balance beam behind Simone Biles. As a result, she was added to the national team.

In September, Eaker competed at the US World Championships trials, where she placed third in the all-around behind Simone Biles and Sunisa Lee. She also placed third on bars behind Lee and Leanne Wong, first on beam, and third on floor behind Biles and Lee. The following day, she was named to the team to compete at the 2019 World Championships in Stuttgart alongside Biles, Lee, MyKayla Skinner, Jade Carey, and Grace McCallum.

During qualifications at the World Championships, Eaker competed on bars and beam only, helping the USA qualify to the team final in first place over five points ahead of second place China. Eaker originally qualified to the balance beam final in fourth place; however, since her credited difficulty score (5.8) was nearly a point lower than her previous international performances - such as the 6.6 difficulty score she received at the Pan American Games - USA Gymnastics filed an inquiry in an attempt to raise her score. This decrease was due to her switch ring leap being downgraded to a switch split leap. While reviewing the routine, rather than crediting the leap, the judging panel instead downgraded a second dance element (her ring leap was credited as a split leap), lowering her score by an additional 0.4 points. Her updated score instead placed her as the first reserve for the beam final.

In the team final, Eaker competed a hit routine on balance beam and did not attempt the switch ring leap, helping the USA win the gold medal ahead of Russia and Italy. She tied with Chen Yile of China for the third highest beam score in the final behind teammate Biles and first-year Chinese competitor Li Shijia. During the all-around final, Canadian Ellie Black, who qualified in seventh place to the balance beam final, was injured on vault. She later pulled out of the balance beam final, allowing Eaker to replace her as first reserve. During the balance beam final, Eaker once again performed a clean routine without her switch ring leap and scored 14.000, finishing fourth behind 2014 and 2015 World balance beam champion Biles, reigning World balance beam Champion Liu Tingting, and Li.

=== 2020 ===
In March, Eaker was selected to compete at the City of Jesolo Trophy alongside teammate Leanne Wong, as well as seniors Shilese Jones and Sophia Butler. However, the USA decided to not send a team due to the COVID-19 pandemic in Italy.

In November Eaker signed her National Letter of Intent with the University of Utah, intending to start in the 2021–22 school year.

=== 2021 ===
In April, Eaker competed at the American Classic. She placed fifth in the all-around with a score of 52.700 and placed third on balance beam behind Sunisa Lee and Skye Blakely. In May Eaker competed at the U.S. Classic where she finished ninth in the all-around and third on balance beam behind Simone Biles and teammate Leanne Wong. At the National Championships, Eaker finished tenth in the all-around and fifth on balance beam. As a result, she was named to the national team and selected to compete at the upcoming Olympic Trials. At the Olympic Trials, Eaker finished seventh in the all-around and second on balance beam. She was selected as an alternate for the Olympic team. Prior to the start of the Olympic Games, while the main and reserve teams were training in Narita, Eaker tested positive for COVID-19.

== Collegiate gymnastics career ==
=== 2021–22 season ===
Eaker made her NCAA debut on January 7 at the Best of Utah meet where she competed on balance beam and floor exercise to help Utah win. During vault warmups Eaker's hand slipped causing her to fall and seek medical attention.

=== 2023–24 season ===
On October 20, 2023, Eaker, who was 20 years of age, announced via Instagram her retirement from the sport of gymnastics and her withdrawal as a student from the University of Utah, where she had been coached by Tom Farden, citing verbal and emotional abuse from a coach and lack of support from the administration. In her Instagram post she states that she had been diagnosed with severe anxiety and depression, anxiety induced insomnia, and suffers from panic attacks, PTSD, and night terrors. Eaker cited that the abuse often happened in individual coach-athlete meetings, in which she would be isolated in a closed-door office with an overpowering coach, while he used "condescending, sarcastic and manipulative" tactics. Additionally she states that she was "personally attacked, humiliated, degraded and yelled at to the point of tears in front of the whole team". Furthermore, Eaker stated that the University of Utah administration "completely dismissed" her when she attempted to report the abuse.

A second student made a similar complaint four days later, and in early November, Farden was put on administrative leave by the school. Nine days later Farden was officially removed from his coaching position.

=== 2024–25 season ===
On August 15, 2024, the Georgia Bulldogs women's gymnastics team announced via social media that Eaker had joined their team.

=== Regular season ranking ===
Season	All-around	Vault	Uneven bars	Balance beam	Floor exercise
2022	N/A	N/A	N/A	N/A	N/A
2023	N/A	N/A	N/A	4th	N/A
2025	N/A	N/A	N/A	57th	N/A
2026	N/A	N/A	N/A	N/A	N/A

=== Career perfect 10.0 ===
Season	Date	Event	Meet
2022	April 2, 2022	Balance Beam	NCAA Regional finals
2023	January 13, 2023	Balance Beam	Best of Utah meet

== Competitive history ==
Competitive history of Kara Eaker
Year	Event	Team	AA	VT	UB	BB	FX
2017	Parkettes National Qualifier		3rd place, bronze medalist(s)			3rd place, bronze medalist(s)	3rd place, bronze medalist(s)
2017	American Classic (junior)			25	34	1st place, gold medalist(s)	2nd place, silver medalist(s)
2017	U.S. Classic (junior)		5	26	14	3rd place, bronze medalist(s)	7
2017	P&G National Championships (junior)		3rd place, bronze medalist(s)	14	5	1st place, gold medalist(s)	4
2018	Auburn National Qualifier		1st place, gold medalist(s)	4	3rd place, bronze medalist(s)	1st place, gold medalist(s)	1st place, gold medalist(s)
2018	American Classic		4	9	12	1st place, gold medalist(s)	2nd place, silver medalist(s)
2018	U.S. Classic		16		13	5	14
2018	U.S. National Championships		7		9	2nd place, silver medalist(s)	5
2018	Pan American Championships	1st place, gold medalist(s)				1st place, gold medalist(s)	3rd place, bronze medalist(s)
2018	Worlds Team Selection Camp		6	8	9	1st place, gold medalist(s)	5
2018	World Championships	1st place, gold medalist(s)				6	
2019	International Gymnix	1st place, gold medalist(s)	1st place, gold medalist(s)		5	1st place, gold medalist(s)	
2019	U.S. Classic		4		10	1st place, gold medalist(s)	4
2019	Pan American Games	1st place, gold medalist(s)	4			1st place, gold medalist(s)	2nd place, silver medalist(s)
2019	U.S. National Championships		10		11	2nd place, silver medalist(s)	10
2019	Worlds Team Selection Camp		3rd place, bronze medalist(s)	9	3rd place, bronze medalist(s)	1st place, gold medalist(s)	3rd place, bronze medalist(s)
2019	World Championships	1st place, gold medalist(s)				4	
2021	American Classic		5	17	8	3rd place, bronze medalist(s)	11
2021	U.S. Classic		9		7	3rd place, bronze medalist(s)	14
2021	U.S. National Championships		10		16	5	12
2021	Olympic Trials		7		11	2nd place, silver medalist(s)	6
