= Aleah Finnegan =

Filipino-American artistic gymnast (born 2003)

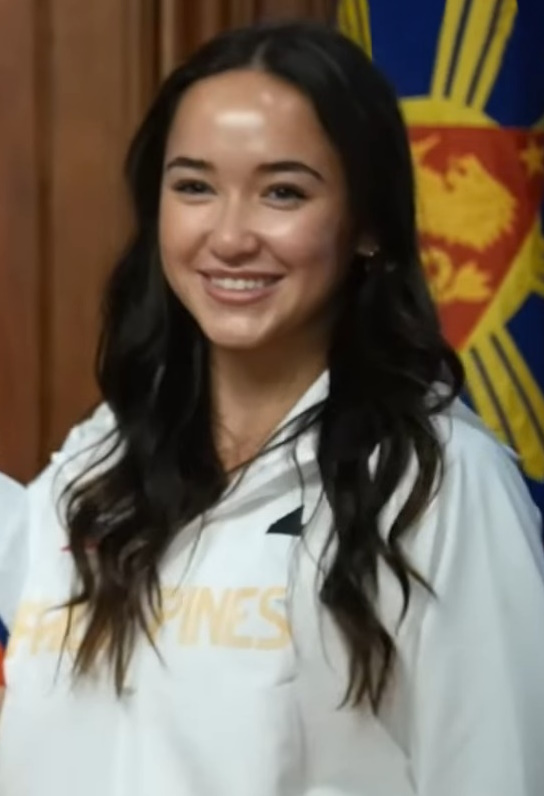
- Finnegan in 2024

Personal information
- Full name: Aleah Cruz Finnegan (Note: Although born in the United States, Aleah Finnegan still possesses her mother's maiden name (Cruz) as is the convention in the Philippines as indicated on her birth record.)
- Born: January 4, 2003 (age 23) St. Louis, Missouri, U.S.
- Height: 5 ft 4 in (163 cm)

Gymnastics career
- Discipline: Women's artistic gymnastics
- Country represented: Philippines; (2022–present)
- Former countries represented: United States (2019–2021)
- College team: LSU Tigers (2022–2025)
- Gym: Great American Gymnastics Express
- Former coaches: Al Fong; Armine Barutyan
Medal record
Women's artistic gymnastics
Event	1st	2nd	3rd
Pan American Games	1	0	0
Asian Championships	0	0	2
Southeast Asian Games	3	2	1
Total	4	2	3
Representing United States
Pan American Games
Gold medal – first place	2019 Lima	Team
Representing Philippines
Asian Championships
Bronze medal – third place	2023 Singapore	Vault
Bronze medal – third place	2023 Singapore	Balance beam
Southeast Asian Games
Gold medal – first place	2021 Vietnam	Team
Gold medal – first place	2021 Vietnam	Vault
Gold medal – first place	2025 Thailand	Vault
Silver medal – second place	2021 Vietnam	All-around
Silver medal – second place	2021 Vietnam	Balance beam
Bronze medal – third place	2025 Thailand	Balance beam
Representing Louisiana State Tigers
NCAA Championships
Gold medal – first place	2024 Fort Worth	Team
Gold medal – first place	2024 Fort Worth	Floor exercise
Silver medal – second place	2023 Fort Worth	Floor exercise

Aleah Cruz Finnegan (born January 4, 2003) is a Filipino-American artistic gymnast. Born in the United States, she represents the Philippines internationally and competed for her country of birth in the past. She was a member of the United States' women's national gymnastics team from 2019 to 2021 and was part of the team that won gold at the 2019 Pan American Games. She is the first Filipina gymnast in over 60 years to qualify and represent the Philippines at the 2024 Summer Olympics. She is the 2023 Asian Championships vault and balance beam bronze medalist and the 2021 Southeast Asian Games team and vault champion. She also competed for the LSU Tigers gymnastics team and is the 2024 NCAA floor exercise champion.

== Early life ==
Finnegan was born in St. Louis, Missouri, to Don and Linabelle Finnegan. She has three sisters, including Sarah, Hannah, and Jennah. Their mother was born in the Philippines and was a resident of Caloocan City before moving to the United States at age 19 as a college student.

Finnegan began gymnastics in 2005 and moved with her family to Kansas City in 2008 to train at Great American Gymnastics Express.

== Gymnastics career ==
=== Level 10: 2016–2017 ===
Finnegan was a Junior Olympic athlete and competed at the 2016 and 2017 J.O Nationals. In 2016, she placed 29th in the all-around and seventh on the balance beam. In 2017, she won gold in the all-around for the Junior-B division.

=== Junior elite: 2018 ===
In 2018, Finnegan qualified to junior elite at Brestyan's National Qualifier. She made her elite debut at the American Classic in July where she finished sixth in the all-around but won bronze on the balance beam. Later that month, she competed at the 2018 U.S. Classic where she placed seventh in the all-around. In August, she competed at her first National Championships where she placed 14th in the all-around, fourth on vault, 18th on uneven bars and balance beam, and 15th on floor exercise.

=== Representing the United States: 2019–2021 ===
Finnegan turned senior in 2019. In February, she was named to the team to compete at the International Gymnix in Montreal alongside Alyona Shchennikova, Sloane Blakely, and GAGE teammate Kara Eaker. While there, she won gold in the team final and on vault; she received the fifth highest score in the all-around but did not place due to teammates Eaker and Shchennikova placing higher. In June 2019, Finnegan was named as one of the eight athletes being considered for the team to compete at the 2019 Pan American Games. At the 2019 GK US Classic, Finnegan placed seventh in the all-around. She also placed second on vault behind Jade Carey, twelfth on uneven bars, tenth on balance beam, and seventh on floor exercise. After the competition, she was named to the team to compete at the Pan American Games alongside Eaker, Morgan Hurd, Riley McCusker, and Leanne Wong.

At the 2019 Pan American Games Finnegan competed on vault and floor, with both her scores contributing towards the USA's gold medal winning performance. Individually, Finnegan qualified to the vault final in fourth, behind Ellie Black of Canada, Yesenia Ferrera of Cuba, and Martina Dominici of Argentina. She also posted the fourth highest floor exercise score in the competition, but because teammates McCusker and Eaker scored higher than her, she was unable to compete in the final due to the two-per-country rule. On the first day of event finals, it was announced that Finnegan had withdrawn from the vault final due to injury.

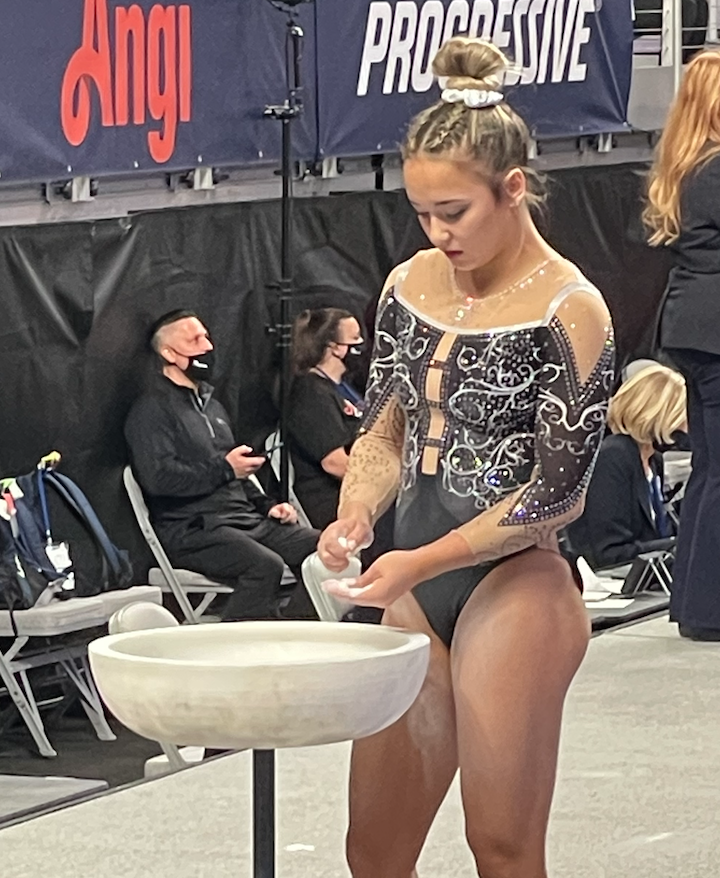
Finnegan at the 2021 U.S. National Championships

At the 2019 National Championships, Finnegan finished thirteenth in the all-around. She also placed fourth on vault, thirteenth on uneven bars, fifteenth on balance beam, and sixth on floor exercise. She was not named to the national team, but it was announced that she would receive an invite to the Worlds selection camp. Finnegan competed at the U.S. World Championship trials on only the balance beam, receiving a score of 13.200, finishing twelfth on the event. She was not named to the World Championship team after the trials.

After the postponement of the 2020 Olympic Games, Finnegan had surgery to fix a fracture in the navicular bone. In November 2020, she signed her National Letter of Intent with Louisiana State University.

In May 2021, Finnegan competed at the 2021 GK U.S. Classic, finishing fifth in the all-around behind Simone Biles, Jordan Chiles, Kayla DiCello, and Grace McCallum. Additionally, she placed seventh on both the balance beam and floor exercise. The following month, she competed at the 2021 National Championships. She finished twenty-third in the all-around after falling during three of the four apparatuses on the first night of competition. As a result, she was not selected to compete at the Olympic Trials. Finnegan announced her retirement from elite gymnastics on June 11, intending to continue competing at the NCAA level with the LSU Tigers.

=== Representing the Philippines: 2022–2025 ===
In March 2022, it was revealed that Finnegan had decided to represent the Philippines in international competitions. The nationality change was approved by the International Gymnastics Federation in May of that year. At the 2021 Southeast Asian Games (postponed to 2022), she led the Filipino team to first place in the team competition. Individually she placed second in the all-around behind Rifda Irfanaluthfi of Indonesia. She also won gold on vault and silver on balance beam and placed fifth on the uneven bars.

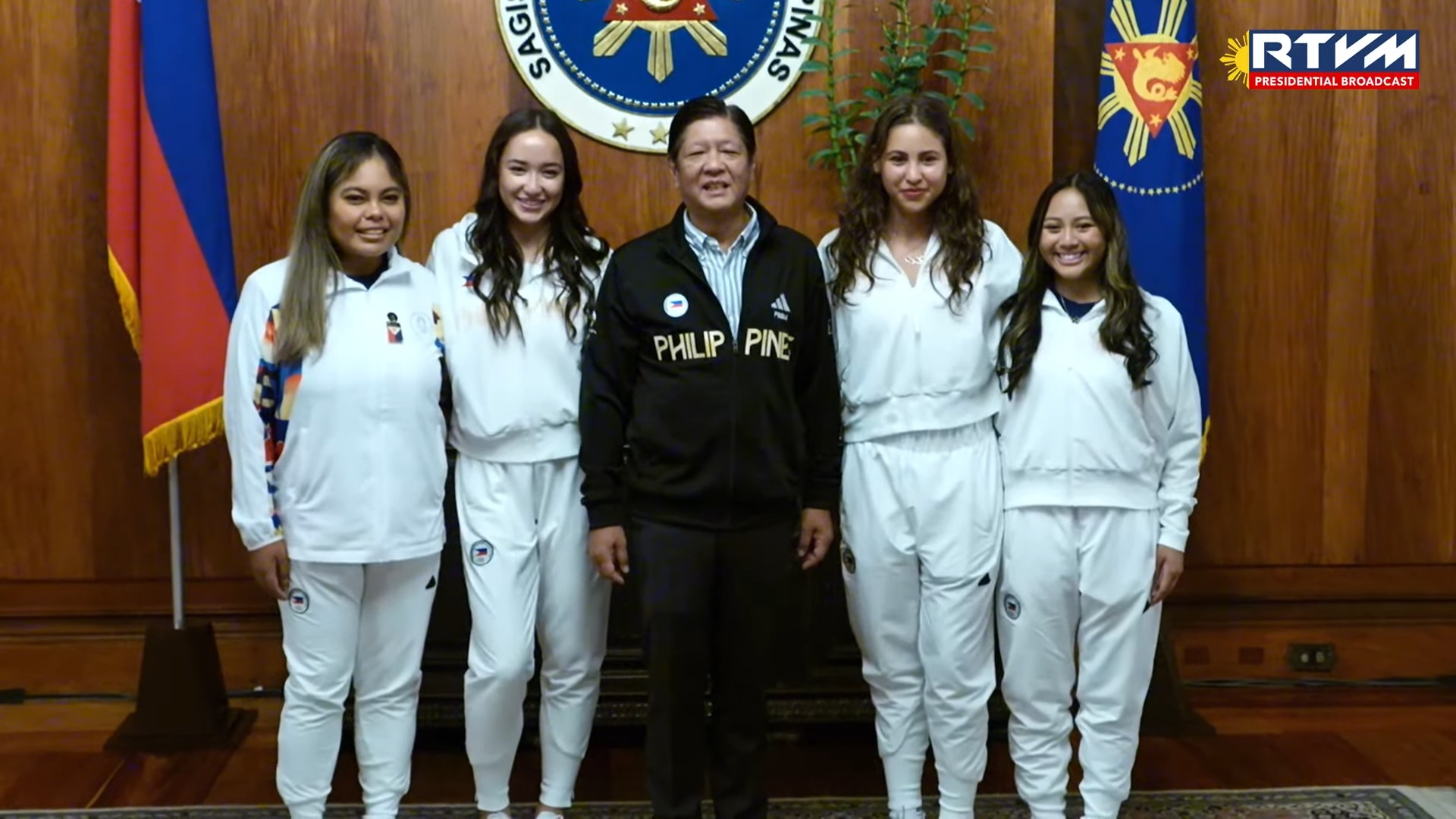
Finnegan (second from left) meeting President Bongbong Marcos

Finnegan competed at the 2023 Asian Championships. On the first day of competition, she helped the Philippines finish fifth as a team, and individually she finished sixth in the all-around. As a result, she qualified as an individual to compete at the 2023 World Championships. During event finals, she won bronze on both vault and balance beam and finished fourth on floor exercise. At the World Championships, Finnegan finished 32nd in the all-around, making her the second reserve for the all-around final. Additionally, she qualified for the 2024 Summer Olympics as an individual.

Finnegan competed at the 2024 Olympic Games alongside fellow Filipina-Americans Levi Ruivivar and Emma Malabuyo. They were the first female Filipina artistic gymnasts to compete at the Olympics since Evelyn Magluyan competed at the 1964 Games. During qualifications Finnegan finished 47th in the all-around. Additionally she finished seventeenth on vault, the highest vault placement for a Filipina gymnast at the Olympics.

In 2025, Finnegan competed at the World Championships. She competed in the all-around, scoring 49.299 and placing 33rd in qualifications.

== NCAA gymnastics career ==
=== 2021–2022 season ===
Competing for the LSU Tigers, Finnegan made her collegiate debut on January 28 in a meet against Georgia. She only competed on the balance beam where she scored a 9.875. She competed on balance beam at the SEC Championships, finishing seventh with a score of 9.925.

=== 2022–2023 season ===
On February 3, 2023, in a meet against Georgia, Finnegan earned her first career perfect 10 for the LSU Tigers on the floor exercise. The following week, she earned her second perfect 10 on vault against Auburn, winning the all-around ahead of Sunisa Lee with a score of 39.8. On February 17, Finnegan scored a perfect 10 for the third week in a row, this time on the balance beam, helping LSU upset the No. 2 Florida Gators. At the SEC Championships, she scored 9.950 on the floor exercise and finished in second place. She also finished second on floor exercise at the NCAA Championships.

=== 2023–2024 season ===
On February 16, Finnegan earned her fifth career perfect 10 on floor exercise in a meet against Auburn. The following week, she scored another perfect 10 on the event in an away meet against Florida. At the SEC Championships, Finnegan contributed scores on vault, balance beam and floor exercise, helping LSU win the SEC conference title. During the NCAA Championship semifinals, she won an individual national title on floor exercise with a score of 9.9625 and helped LSU advance to the final. During the championship final, Finnegan scored a 9.9125 on floor exercise followed by a 9.8375 on vault. In the last rotation, she anchored the Tigers on the balance beam with a 9.950, clinching LSU's first national championship title in program history.

=== 2024–2025 season ===
On March 7, Finnegan scored a perfect 10 on balance beam in a meet against Georgia. At the SEC Championships, Finnegan scored 39.6750 to help the Tigers win their sixth team title, defeating the second place Oklahoma Sooners and the third place Florida Gators. Finnegan tied for first on the balance beam after scoring 9.9250, sharing the title with teammate Haleigh Bryant and Oklahoma's Faith Torrez. During the NCAA Championship semifinals, she scored 38.8625 in the all-around, helping LSU place fifth in the team competition. She also placed fifth on floor exercise.

== Personal life ==
Aleah Finnegan's sisters would also become competitive gymnasts. Sarah was an alternate for the 2012 U.S. Olympic Team, and Hannah competed for the Philippines at the 2011 Southeast Asian Games. Their father died in August 2019.

== Competitive history ==
Competitive history of Aleah Finnegan representing the United States
Year	Event	Team	AA	VT	UB	BB	FX
2016	J.O. National Championships		28			7	
2017	J.O. National Championships		1st place, gold medalist(s)	2nd place, silver medalist(s)	13	2nd place, silver medalist(s)	5
2018	Brestyan's National Qualifier		3rd place, bronze medalist(s)				
2018	American Classic (jr)		6	5	15	3rd place, bronze medalist(s)	5
2018	U.S. Classic (jr)		7	5	16	7	7
2018	U.S. National Championships (jr)		14	4	18	18	15
2019	International Gymnix	1st place, gold medalist(s)		1st place, gold medalist(s)			
2019	U.S. Classic		7	2nd place, silver medalist(s)	12	10	7
2019	Pan American Games	1st place, gold medalist(s)		WD			
2019	U.S. National Championships		13	4	13	15	6
2019	Worlds Team Selection Camp					12	
2021	U.S. Classic		5		15	7	7
2021	U.S. National Championships		23		23	18	14

Competitive history of Aleah Finnegan representing the Philippines
Year	Event	Team	AA	VT	UB	BB	FX
2022	Southeast Asian Games	1st place, gold medalist(s)	2nd place, silver medalist(s)	1st place, gold medalist(s)	5	2nd place, silver medalist(s)	
2023
2023	Asian Championships	5	6	3rd place, bronze medalist(s)		3rd place, bronze medalist(s)	4
2023	World Championships		R2				
2024
2024	Olympic Games		47				
2025
2025	World Championships		33				
2025	Southeast Asian Games			1st place, gold medalist(s)		3rd place, bronze medalist(s)	

Competitive history of Aleah Finnegan representing the LSU Tigers
Year	Event	Team	AA	VT	UB	BB	FX
2022	SEC Championships	5				7	
2023	SEC Championships	3rd place, bronze medalist(s)	4	7	28	6	2nd place, silver medalist(s)
2023	NCAA Championship	4	5				2nd place, silver medalist(s)
2024	SEC Championships	1st place, gold medalist(s)		13		20	41
2024	NCAA Championship	1st place, gold medalist(s)				24	1st place, gold medalist(s)
2025	SEC Championships	1st place, gold medalist(s)	2nd place, silver medalist(s)	6	5	1st place, gold medalist(s)	11
2025	NCAA Championships	5	20	14	35	54	5

== Collegiate stats ==
=== Career perfect 10.0 ===
Season	Date	Event	Meet
2023	February 3, 2023	Floor Exercise	LSU vs Georgia
2023	February 10, 2023	Vault	LSU @ Auburn
2023	February 17, 2023	Balance Beam	LSU vs Florida
2023	February 24, 2023	Floor Exercise	LSU @ Alabama
2024	February 16, 2024	Floor Exercise	LSU vs Auburn
2024	February 23, 2024	Floor Exercise	LSU @ Florida
2024	April 4, 2024	Floor Exercise	Arkansas Regional Semifinal
2025	March 7, 2025	Balance Beam	LSU vs Georgia

=== Regular season rankings ===
Season	All-Around	Vault	Uneven Bars	Balance Beam	Floor Exercise
2022	N/A	N/A	N/A	42nd	108th
2023	12th	30th	75th	6th	4th
2024	N/A	77th	N/A	36th	9th
2025	8th	10th	45th	9th	14th

== See also ==
- Nationality changes in gymnastics
