= 2018 U.S. Classic =

2018 GK U.S. Classic
- Venue: Schottenstein Center
- Location: Columbus, Ohio
- Dates: July 28, 2018

Medalists
gold medal	Simone Biles; Leanne Wong
silver medal	Riley McCusker; Kayla DiCello
bronze medal	Morgan Hurd; Jordan Bowers

The 2018 U.S. Classic, known as the 2018 GK U.S. Classic for sponsorship reasons, is the 35th edition of the U.S. Classic gymnastics tournament. The competition was held on July 28, 2018, at the Schottenstein Center in Columbus, Ohio.

== Medalists ==
Event	Gold	Silver	Bronze
Senior
All-Around	Simone Biles	Riley McCusker	Morgan Hurd
Vault	Jade Carey	Jordan Chiles	N/A
Uneven Bars	Riley McCusker	Alyona Shchennikova	Morgan Hurd
Balance Beam	Simone Biles	Riley McCusker	Ragan Smith
Floor Exercise	Simone Biles	Jade Carey	Morgan Hurd
Junior
All-Around	Leanne Wong	Kayla DiCello	Jordan Bowers
Vault	Leanne Wong	Kayla DiCello	Skye Blakely
Uneven Bars	Kayla DiCello	Jordan Bowers	Sunisa Lee; Konnor McClain
Balance Beam	Sunisa Lee	Jordan Bowers	Leanne Wong
Floor Exercise	Leanne Wong	Karis German	Kayla DiCello; Olivia Greaves; Sophia Butler

== Participants ==
=== Seniors ===
- Shania Adams – Plain City, Ohio (Buckeye Gymnastics)
- Stephanie Berger – Groton, Massachusetts (Brestyan's)
- Simone Biles – Spring, Texas (World Champions Centre)
- Sloane Blakely – Frisco, Texas (WOGA)
- Luisa Blanco – Frisco, Texas (WOGA)
- Jade Carey – Phoenix, Arizona (Arizona Sunrays)
- Jordan Chiles – Vancouver, Washington (Naydenov Gymnastics)
- Audrey Davis – Frisco, Texas (WOGA)
- Olivia Dunne – Hillsdale, New Jersey (Eastern National Academy of Paramus)
- Kara Eaker – Grain Valley, Missouri (GAGE)
- Jaylene Gilstrap – McKinney, Texas (Metroplex Gymnastics)
- Olivia Hollingsworth – Seabrook, Texas (World Champions Centre)
- Morgan Hurd – Middletown, Delaware (First State Gymnastics)
- Madeleine Johnston – Boyds, Maryland (Hill's Gymnastics)
- Shilese Jones – Westerville, Ohio (Future Gymnastics)
- Adeline Kenlin – Iowa City, Iowa (IGN)
- Emily Lee – Los Gatos, California (West Valley Gymnastics)
- Isabel Mabanta – Frisco, Texas (Denton Gymnastics)
- Emma Malabuyo – Flower Mound, Texas (Texas Dreams Gymnastics)
- Grace McCallum – Isanti, Minnesota (Twin City Twisters)
- Riley McCusker – Brielle, New Jersey (MG Elite)
- Alyona Shchennikova – Evergreen, Colorado (5280 Gymnastics)
- Ragan Smith – Lewisville, Texas (Texas Dreams Gymnastics)
- Deanne Soza – Coppell, Texas (Texas Dreams Gymnastics)
- Madelyn Williams – Vacaville, California (San Mateo Gymnastics)

=== Juniors ===
- Ciena Alipio – San Jose, California (West Valley Gymnastics)
- Sydney Barros – Woodstock, Georgia (Texas Dreams Gymnastics)
- Annie Beard – Dallas, Texas (Texas Dreams Gymnastics)
- Love Birt – Wyoming, Delaware (First State Gymnastics)
- Skye Blakely – Frisco, Texas (WOGA)
- Jordan Bowers – Lincoln, Nebraska (Solid Rock Gymnastics)
- Sophia Butler – Houston, Texas (Discover Gymnastics)
- Kailin Chio – Henderson, Nevada (Gymcats)
- Claire Dean – Oakland, California (Head Over Heels)
- Kayla DiCello – Boyds, Maryland (Hill's Gymnastics)
- Amari Drayton – Lakeway, Texas (Olympia Hills)
- Addison Fatta – Wrightsville, Pennsylvania (Prestige Gymnastics)
- Aleah Finnegan – Lee's Summit, Missouri (GAGE)
- Delaney Fisher – Flowery Branch, Georgia (Georgia Elite)
- eMjae Frazier – Erial, New Jersey (Parkettes)
- Gabbie Gallentine – Iron Station, North Carolina (Everest Gymnastics)
- Elizabeth Gantner – Indianapolis, Indiana (Jaycie Phelps Athletic Center)
- Karis German – Spring, Texas (World Champions Center)
- Trista Goodman – Henderson, Nevada (Salcianu Elite)
- Zoe Gravier – Holmdel, New Jersey (MG Elite)
- Olivia Greaves – Staten Island, New York (MG Elite)
- Hannah Hagle – Chireno, Texas (Texas East Gymnastics)
- Maeve Hahn – Lake Wylie, South Carolina (First in Flight)
- Selena Harris – Henderson, Nevada (Gymcats)
- Alexis Jeffrey – Warrensburg, Missouri (GAGE)
- Kaytlyn Johnson – Lantana, Texas (Denton Gymnastics Academy)
- Levi Jung-Ruivivar – Woodland Hills, California (Paramount Elite)
- Alonna Kratzer – Suwanee, Georgia (Top Notch Training Center)
- Sunisa Lee – St. Paul, Minnesota (Midwest Gymnastics)
- Lillian Lewis – Dublin, California (San Mateo Gymnastics)
- Kaliya Lincoln – Mountain House, California (Airborne Gymnastics)
- Lillian Lippeatt – Mason, Ohio (Cincinnati Gymnastics)
- Lauren Little – Mooresville, North Carolina (Everest Gymnastics)
- Mallory Marcheli – Richmond, Texas (Stars Gymnastics - Houston)
- Konnor McClain – Cross Lanes, West Virginia (Revolution Gymnastics)
- Sydney Morris – Bowie, Maryland (First State Gymnastics)
- Brenna Neault – Alta Loma, California (Precision Gymnastics)
- Lauren Pearl – Milford, Massachusetts (Brestyan's)
- Katelyn Rosen – Boerne, Texas (Mavericks at Artemovs)
- Lyden Saltness – Forest Lake, Minnesota (Midwest Gymnastics)
- Abigail Scanlon – Sterling, Virginia (Capital Gymnastics)
- JaFree Scott – Independence, Missouri (GAGE)
- Ava Siegfeldt – Hampton, Virginia (World Class Gymnastics)
- Victoria Smirnov – Hickory, North Carolina (Shooting Stars Gymnastics)
- Ui Soma – Belmont, California (San Mateo Gymnastics)
- Calvary Swaney – Gastonia, North Carolina (First in Flight)
- Tori Tatum – Chanhassen, Minnesota (Twin City Twisters))
- Leanne Wong – Overland Park, Kansas (GAGE)
