= Sloane Blakely =

American artistic gymnast (born 2002)

- Full name: Sloane Blakely
- Born: December 23, 2002 (age 23) Dallas, Texas, USA
- Height: 5 ft 1 in (155 cm)
- Relatives: Skye Blakely (sister)

Gymnastics career
- Discipline: Women's artistic gymnastics
- Country represented: United States; (2019)
- College team: Florida Gators (2022–2025)
- Club: World Olympic Gymnastics Academy
- Head coach: Tatyana Shadenko
Medal record
Representing Florida Gators
NCAA Championships
Silver medal – second place	2022 Fort Worth	Team
Silver medal – second place	2023 Fort Worth	Team

Sloane Blakely (born December 23, 2002) is an American collegiate artistic gymnast and was a member of the United States women's national gymnastics team. She is currently competing for the Florida Gators in NCAA gymnastics. She is the older sister of gymnast Skye Blakely.

== Early life ==
Blakely was born to Steven and Stephanie Blakely in 2002 in Dallas, Texas, and has one sibling, Skye. She originally did ballet and tap dancing prior to starting gymnastics training.

== Gymnastics career ==
=== 2016 ===
Blakely qualified as a junior elite gymnast in 2016. She made her elite debut at the 2016 U.S. Classic where she placed 21st in the all-around. She next competed at the U.S. National Championships where she finished 18th.

=== 2018 ===
Blakely became age-eligible for senior level competition in 2018. She made her senior debut at the American Classic where she placed sixth in the all-around. Later that month she competed at the 2018 U.S. Classic where she placed seventh in the all-around and fourth on balance beam. In August Blakely competed at the 2018 U.S. National Gymnastics Championships. She finished 16th in the all-around.

=== 2019 ===
In February Blakely was named to the team to compete at 2019 L'International Gymnix in Montreal, alongside Kara Eaker, Aleah Finnegan, and Alyona Shchennikova. As a result, she was named to the national team for the first time. While there she helped the USA win team gold and individually she won silver on balance beam behind Eaker and finished fourth on floor exercise.

In June Blakely competed at the American Classic where she placed first on balance beam, second on vault behind Faith Torrez, and fifth on floor exercise. After the conclusion of the American Classic, Blakely was named as one of the eight athletes being considered for the team that would compete at the 2019 Pan American Games, along with Kara Eaker, Aleah Finnegan, Morgan Hurd, Shilese Jones, Sunisa Lee, Riley McCusker and Leanne Wong. The following month Blakely competed at the U.S. Classic where she only competed on vault, balance beam, and floor exercise. She was not selected to compete at the Pan American Games.

In August Blakely competed at the U.S. National Championships where she once again only competed on vault, balance beam, and floor exercise. She finished ninth and sixteenth on the latter two events.

=== 2020 ===
Blakely competed at the 2020 L'International Gymnix as a Challenger and not part of national team. She finished first in the all-around and on balance beam. In November Blakely signed her National Letter of Intent with the Florida Gators.

=== 2021 ===
Blakely dropped down to level 10 in 2021. She qualified to and competed at the Nastia Liukin Cup where she finished 13th. In May Blakely competed at the Developmental National Championships where she placed first in the senior-F division and swept titles on all apparatuses. In doing so Blakely became the first level 10 gymnast to sweep all of the titles at a National Championships.

== Collegiate gymnastics career ==
=== 2021–2022 season ===
Blakely made her NCAA debut on January 7 in a quad meet against Rutgers, Northern Illinois, and Texas Women's. She competed on all four apparatuses and had the highest all-around and balance beam scores of the meet. Blakely became the first Florida Gator gymnast since Kytra Hunter in 2012 to win the all-around in a debut collegiate meet. As a result, Blakely was named SEC Gymnast of the Week. In doing so she became the first freshman to earn the opening SEC Gymnast of the Week honor of a season since the honor began in 2000.

=== Career perfect 10.0 ===
Season	Date	Event	Meet
2022	March 4, 2022	Floor exercise	Florida @ Auburn
2025	February 14, 2025	Floor exercise	Florida vs Auburn

=== Regular season rankings ===
Season	All-Around	Vault	Uneven Bars	Balance Beam	Floor Exercise
2022	57th	91st	112th	20th	165th
2023	N/A	68th	54th	62nd	N/A
2024	32nd	77th	145th	36th	59th

== Competitive history ==
Year	Event	Team	AA	VT	UB	BB	FX
Junior
2016	U.S. Classic		21	15	33	15	11
2016	U.S. National Championships		18	15	25	11	17
Senior
2018	American Classic		6	11	13	6	9
2018	U.S. Classic		7		16	4	11
2018	U.S. National Championships		16		18	11	15
2019	International Gymnix	1st place, gold medalist(s)				2nd place, silver medalist(s)	4
2019	American Classic			2nd place, silver medalist(s)		1st place, gold medalist(s)	5
2019	U.S. Classic					14	16
2019	U.S. National Championships					9	16
2020	International Gymnix		1st place, gold medalist(s)			1st place, gold medalist(s)	
Level 10
2021	Nastia Liukin Cup		13				
2021	L10 National Championships		1st place, gold medalist(s)	1st place, gold medalist(s)	1st place, gold medalist(s)	1st place, gold medalist(s)	1st place, gold medalist(s)
NCAA
2022	SEC Championships	1st place, gold medalist(s)	11				
2022	NCAA Championships	2nd place, silver medalist(s)					
2023	SEC Championships	1st place, gold medalist(s)					
2023	NCAA Championships	2nd place, silver medalist(s)	21				
2024	NCAA Championships	4			39	12	28
