= 2019 U.S. National Gymnastics Championships =

- Venue: Sprint Center
- Location: Kansas City, Missouri, U.S.
- Date: August 8, 2019—August 11, 2019

The 2019 U.S. National Gymnastics Championships was the 56th edition of the U.S. National Gymnastics Championships. The competition was held from August 8–11, 2019 at the Sprint Center in Kansas City, Missouri.

== Competition schedule ==
The competition featured Senior and Junior competitions for both women's and men's disciplines. The preliminary competition schedule was as follows:

- Thursday, August 8: Men's gymnastics – 1 p.m., juniors, and 6:30 p.m., seniors
- Friday, August 9: Women's gymnastics – 1 p.m., juniors, and 6:30 p.m., seniors
- Saturday, August 10: Men's gymnastics – 1 p.m., juniors, and 6:30 p.m., seniors
- Sunday, August 11: Women's gymnastics – 1 p.m., juniors, and 6:30 p.m., seniors

== Medalists ==
Event	Gold	Silver	Bronze
Senior Women
Individual all-around	Simone Biles	Sunisa Lee	Grace McCallum
Vault	Simone Biles	Jade Carey	MyKayla Skinner
Uneven bars	Sunisa Lee	Morgan Hurd	Simone Biles
Balance beam	Simone Biles	Kara Eaker	Leanne Wong
Floor	Simone Biles	Jade Carey	Sunisa Lee
Junior Women
Individual all-around	Kayla DiCello	Konnor McClain	Olivia Greaves
Vault	Kayla DiCello	Konnor McClain	Sophia Butler
Uneven bars	Olivia Greaves	Konnor McClain	Kayla DiCello Sydney Barros
Balance beam	Konnor McClain	Skye Blakely Ciena Alipio	—N/a
Floor	Kayla DiCello	Sydney Barros	Skye Blakely
Senior Men
Individual all-around	Sam Mikulak	Yul Moldauer	Akash Modi
Floor	Sam Mikulak	Yul Moldauer	Gage Dyer
Pommel horse	Sam Mikulak	Stephen Nedoroscik	Allan Bower
Rings	Alex Diab	Trevor Howard	Donnell Whittenburg
Vault	Shane Wiskus	Timothy Wang Kiwan Watts	—N/a
Parallel bars	Sam Mikulak	Yul Moldauer	Shane Wiskus
Horizontal bar	Sam Mikulak	Akash Modi	Paul Juda
Junior Men (17-18)
Individual all-around	Colt Walker	Garrett Braunton	Crew Bold
Junior Men (15-16)
Individual all-around	Taylor Burkhart	Nick Kuebler	Asher Hong

== Women's national team ==
The top 6 all-around females automatically made the national team. For juniors, Kayla DiCello, Konnor McClain, Olivia Greaves, Skye Blakely, Sydney Barros, and Ciena Alipio were the top 6 finishers. Additionally Sophia Butler, eMjae Frazier, Lilly Lippeatt, and Anya Pilgrim were also added to the National Team. For seniors the top six were Simone Biles, Sunisa Lee, Grace McCallum, Morgan Hurd, Leanne Wong, and Jordan Chiles. Additionally Jade Carey, MyKayla Skinner, Trinity Thomas, Kara Eaker, and Riley McCusker were also added to the senior national team.

== Women's participants ==
The following individuals are participating in competition:

=== Seniors ===
- Simone Biles – Spring, Texas (World Champions Centre)
- Sloane Blakely – Frisco, Texas (WOGA)
- Jade Carey – Phoenix, Arizona (Arizona Sunrays)
- Jordan Chiles – Spring, Texas (World Champions Centre)
- Kara Eaker – Grain Valley, Missouri (GAGE)
- Aleah Finnegan – Lee's Summit, Missouri (GAGE)
- Morgan Hurd – Middletown, Delaware (First State)
- Shilese Jones – Westerville, Ohio (Future Gymnastics Academy)
- Emily Lee – Los Gatos, California (West Valley Gymnastics School)
- Sunisa Lee – St. Paul, Minnesota (Midwest Gymnastics Center)
- Grace McCallum – Isanti, Minnesota (Twin City Twisters)
- Riley McCusker – Brielle, New Jersey (MG Elite)
- Gabby Perea – Geneva, Illinois (Legacy Elite)
- MyKayla Skinner – Gilbert, Arizona (Desert Lights Gymnastics)
- Trinity Thomas – York, Pennsylvania (University of Florida)
- Faith Torrez – Pleasant Prairie, Wisconsin (Legacy Elite)
- Leanne Wong – Overland Park, Kansas (GAGE)

=== Juniors ===
- Ciena Alipio – San Jose, California (West Valley Gymnastics)
- Sydney Barros – Lewisville, Texas (Texas Dreams)
- Love Birt – Camden, Delaware (First State Gymnastics)
- Skye Blakely – Frisco, Texas (WOGA)
- Sophia Butler – Houston, Texas (Discover)
- Kailin Chio – Henderson, Nevada (Gymcats)
- Kayla DiCello – Boyds, Maryland (Hill's Gymnastics)
- Addison Fatta – Wrightsville, Pennsylvania (Prestige)
- eMjae Frazier – Erial, New Jersey (Parkettes)
- Karis German – Spring, Texas (World Champions Center)
- Olivia Greaves – Staten Island, New York (MG Elite)
- Levi Jung-Ruivivar – Woodland Hills, California (Paramount Elite)
- Lilly Lippeatt – Mason, Ohio (Cincinnati Gymnastics)
- Lauren Little – Mooresville, North Carolina (Everest Gymnastics)
- Nola Matthews – Gilroy, California (Airborne Gymnastics)
- Konnor McClain – Cross Lanes, West Virginia (Revolution Gymnastics)
- Zoe Miller – Spring, Texas (World Champions Centre)
- Kaylen Morgan – Huntersville, North Carolina (Everest Gymanstics)
- Sydney Morris – Bowie, Maryland (First State Gymnastics)
- Sophie Parenti – Menlo Park, California (San Mateo Gymnastics)
- Anya Pilgrim – Germantown, Maryland (Hill's Gymnastics)
- Ariel Posen – Manalapan, New Jersey (MG Elite)
- Sienna Robinson – Las Vegas, Nevada (Browns Gymanstics)
- Katelyn Rosen – Boerne, Texas (Mavericks at Artemovs)
- Lyden Saltness – Forest Lake, Minnesota (Midwest Gymnastics)
- Jamison Sears – Yorktown, Virginia (World Class Gymnastics)
- Ava Siegfeldt – Hampton, Virginia (World Class Gymnastics)
- Mya Witte – Greenacres, Florida (Genie's Gymnastics)
- Ella Zirbes – Stillwater, Minnesota (Flips Gymnastics)
