= Konnor McClain =

American artistic gymnast (born 2005)

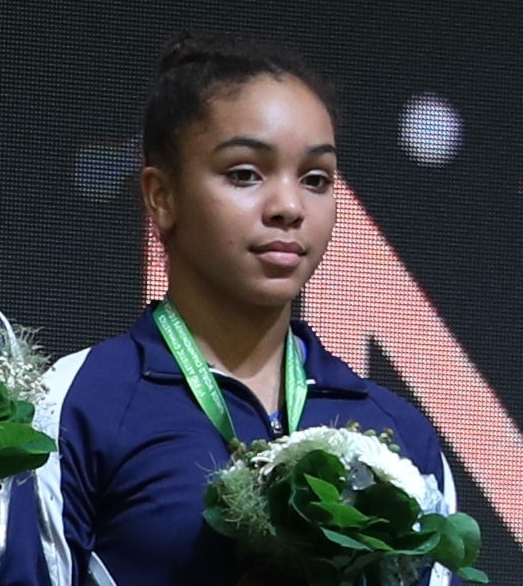
- McClain at the 2019 Junior World Championships

Personal information
- Full name: Konnor McClain
- Born: February 1, 2005 (age 21) Las Vegas, Nevada USA

Gymnastics career
- Discipline: Women's artistic gymnastics
- Country represented: United States; (2018–2023)
- College team: LSU Tigers (2024–27)
- Club: Pacific Reign Gymnastics
- Head coach: Jay Clark
- Former coaches: Valeri Liukin; Cale Robinson
Medal record
Representing the United States
Junior World Championships
Bronze medal – third place	2019 Győr	Team
Representing Louisiana State Tigers
NCAA Championships
Gold medal – first place	2024 Fort Worth	Team
Silver medal – second place	2026 Fort Worth	Team
Silver medal – second place	2026 Fort Worth	Balance Beam

Konnor McClain (born February 1, 2005) is an American artistic gymnast and a former member of the United States women's national gymnastics team. She is the 2022 U.S National Champion and was the 2019 City of Jesolo Trophy and the 2019 U.S. Classic Junior All-Around Champion.

== Early life ==
McClain was born to Marc and Lorinda McClain in 2005 in Las Vegas, Nevada. She has three siblings. Her family moved to West Virginia when she was three years old.

== Junior gymnastics career ==
=== 2015–16 ===
In 2015 McClain was part of the Junior Olympic Program and competed at various HOPEs competitions. She competed at the 2015 HOPES Championships where she placed second on balance beam, behind Ciena Alipio, fourth in the all-around, fifth on vault, and seventh on floor exercise. In 2016 she competed the 2016 Hopes Championships where she placed first in the all-around, on vault, balance beam, and uneven bars, and second on floor exercise.

=== 2017–18 ===
In 2017 McClain qualified for junior elite status at the Brestyans National Qualifier. She also competed at the KPAC National Qualifier and the Parkettes National Qualifier. She made her elite debut at the American Classic where she place 21st in the all-around. In late July she competed at the 2017 U.S. Classic where she placed 24th in the all-around, tying with Kayla DiCello.

In early 2018 McClain competed at the Buckeye National Qualifier and International Gymnix, where she won silver on floor exercise behind Irina Alexeeva. In early July, she competed at the American Classic where she placed second in the all-around behind Kayla DiCello. Later that month she competed at the 2018 U.S. Classic where she only competed three events but won bronze on the uneven bars behind DiCello and Jordan Bowers. In August McClain competed at the 2018 U.S. National Gymnastics Championships. She finished in fifth place in the all-around and won gold on balance beam. As a result she was added to the national team for the first time.

=== 2019 ===
In February, McClain was named to the team to compete at the 2019 City of Jesolo Trophy in Italy, alongside Kayla DiCello, Ciena Alipio, and Sophia Butler. While there she helped the USA win team silver behind Russia and individually she won gold in the all-around, ahead of Russian Vladislava Urazova, and on vault ahead of Russian Viktoria Listunova and teammate Alipio. She also won bronze on uneven bars, behind Urazova and Russian Elena Gerasimova and on floor exercise behind Listunova and Urazova.

In June McClain competed at the Junior World Championships Trials where she placed fourth in the all-around and was named as the alternate for the inaugural Junior World Championships. In July she competed at the U.S. Classic where she won gold in the all-around, on vault, and on balance beam.

In August McClain competed at the U.S. National Championships. After the first day of competition she recorded a score of 56.500 and was in first place. During the second day of competition scored a 56.100, giving her a total combined score of 112.600 which won her the silver medal in the all-around behind Kayla DiCello. McClain won gold on balance beam, silver on vault behind DiCello, and silver on uneven bars behind Olivia Greaves, and placed sixth on floor exercise. She was added to the junior national team.

=== 2020 ===
In March McClain was selected to compete at International Gymnix, taking place in Montreal alongside Skye Blakely, Kaliya Lincoln, and Katelyn Jong. While there she helped the USA win team gold and individually she won silver in the all-around behind Blakely and gold in all four event finals.

== Senior gymnastics career ==
=== 2021 ===
In 2020 it was announced that gymnasts born in 2005, including McClain, would be eligible for the postponed 2020 Summer Olympics in Tokyo. Previously only gymnasts born in 2004 and earlier had been eligible.

McClain made her senior debut at the 2021 Winter Cup, in which she competed on vault and beam. She earned the third highest score on vault and finished fourth on beam. McClain was one of five gymnasts featured on the Peacock docuseries Golden: The Journey of USA's Elite Gymnasts. After a subpar performance at the U.S. Classic McClain abruptly left her gym in West Virginia and moved to Texas to train at WOGA under Valeri Liukin. She subsequently announced she would not compete at the US National Championships or the Olympic Trials, ending her bid for the 2020 Olympics and returning her focus to 2024.

In August McClain verbally committed to compete for the LSU Tigers gymnastics team.

In October McClain was selected to compete at the 2021 World Championships alongside Leanne Wong, Kayla DiCello, and eMjae Frazier. As a result she was re-added to the national team. At the World Championships McClain finished eighth on balance beam during qualifications; however she did not advance to the event final due to teammates Wong and DiCello scoring higher.

=== 2022 ===
McClain competed at the 2022 Winter Cup and won the all-around competition ahead of Skye Blakely and eMjae Frazier. As a result she was selected to compete at the upcoming DTB Pokal Team Challenge in Stuttgart alongside Blakely, Frazier, Nola Matthews, and Ashlee Sullivan. At the DTB Pokal Team Challenge McClain helped team USA win gold. Individually she won gold on balance beam and silver on floor exercise behind Angela Andreoli. In April McClain competed at the 2022 City of Jesolo Trophy alongside Frazier, Shilese Jones, Zoe Miller, and Elle Mueller. Together they won the team event with score 164.065. Individually McClain won all-around title with a score of 54.999 and also took the gold medal on balance beam (13.850) and floor exercise (13.900).

In August McClain competed at the National Championships. She finished first in the all-around and on balance beam, fourth on floor exercise, and eighth on uneven bars.

=== 2024 ===
McClain made her elite return at the Core Hydration Classic. She started on balance beam and scored a 14.200 to win the bronze medal behind Sunisa Lee and Simone Biles. While warming up on floor exercise McClain suffered an Achilles tendon injury and withdrew from the remainder of the competition.

== Collegiate gymnastics career ==
=== 2023–24 season ===
McClain originally intended to start competing for the LSU Tigers after the 2024 Summer Olympics. However in July 2023 McClain announced that she would instead start during the 2023–2024 school year while still pursuing making the Olympic team. She made her debut for the Tigers on January 5, 2024 in a meet against Ohio State. The following week, at a quad meet against Oklahoma, UCLA, and Utah, McClain earned her first perfect 10 on the uneven bars. On January 26, in an away meet against Mizzou, McClain earned her second career perfect 10 and first on the balance beam. At the SEC Championships on March 23, McClain earned her second perfect 10 on the balance beam, claiming the SEC title on the event and helping LSU win the SEC team title. At the NCAA Championships, she contributed scores on uneven bars, balance beam and floor exercise, helping LSU win their first national championship in program history.

=== Career perfect 10.0 ===
Season	Date	Event	Meet
2024	January 13, 2024	Uneven bars	Sprouts Collegiate Quad
2024	January 26, 2024	Balance beam	LSU @ Missouri
2024	March 23, 2024	Balance beam	SEC Championships

=== Regular season rankings ===
Season	All-Around	Vault	Uneven Bars	Balance Beam	Floor Exercise
2024	N/A	N/A	55th	3rd	59th
2025	N/A	N/A	15th	20th	N/A
2026	N/A	58th	8th	11th	N/A

== Competitive history ==
Competitive history of Konnor McClain at the junior level
Year	Event	Team	AA	VT	UB	BB	FX
2017	American Classic		21	11	6	34	17
2017	U.S. Classic		24	26	43	12	27
2018	International Gymnix		14			4	2nd place, silver medalist(s)
2018	American Classic		2nd place, silver medalist(s)	7	3rd place, bronze medalist(s)	2nd place, silver medalist(s)	7
2018	U.S. Classic			11	3rd place, bronze medalist(s)		23
2018	U.S. National Championships		5	9	4	1st place, gold medalist(s)	9
2019	City of Jesolo Trophy	2nd place, silver medalist(s)	1st place, gold medalist(s)	1st place, gold medalist(s)	3rd place, bronze medalist(s)	6	3rd place, bronze medalist(s)
2019	Jr. World Championships Trials		4				
2019	Junior World Championships	(bronze) (Note: McClain was the team USA alternate)					
2019	U.S. Classic		1st place, gold medalist(s)	1st place, gold medalist(s)	12	1st place, gold medalist(s)	4
2019	U.S. National Championships		2nd place, silver medalist(s)	2nd place, silver medalist(s)	2nd place, silver medalist(s)	1st place, gold medalist(s)	6
2020	International Gymnix	1st place, gold medalist(s)	2nd place, silver medalist(s)	1st place, gold medalist(s)	1st place, gold medalist(s)	1st place, gold medalist(s)	1st place, gold medalist(s)

Competitive history of Konnor McClain at the senior level
Year	Event	Team	AA	VT	UB	BB	FX
2021	Winter Cup			3rd place, bronze medalist(s)		4	
2021	U.S. Classic				34	29	
2021	World Team Trials		4				
2022	Winter Cup		1st place, gold medalist(s)		17	1st place, gold medalist(s)	3rd place, bronze medalist(s)
2022	DTB Pokal Team Challenge	1st place, gold medalist(s)				1st place, gold medalist(s)	2nd place, silver medalist(s)
2022	City of Jesolo Trophy	1st place, gold medalist(s)	1st place, gold medalist(s)			1st place, gold medalist(s)	1st place, gold medalist(s)
2022	U.S National Championships		1st place, gold medalist(s)		8	1st place, gold medalist(s)	4
2024	U.S. Classic					3rd place, bronze medalist(s)	

Competitive history of Konnor McClain at the NCAA level
Year	Event	Team	AA	VT	UB	BB	FX
2024	SEC Championships	1st place, gold medalist(s)				1st place, gold medalist(s)	
2024	NCAA Championships	1st place, gold medalist(s)			12	16	10
2025	SEC Championships	1st place, gold medalist(s)			16	5	
2025	NCAA Championships	5			24	13	34
2026	SEC Championships	3rd place, bronze medalist(s)		11	24	2nd place, silver medalist(s)	
2026	NCAA Championships	2nd place, silver medalist(s)		31	9	2nd place, silver medalist(s)	
