= 2019 International Gymnix =

- Location: Montreal, Canada
- Dates: March 8-10
- Nations: 7

The 2019 International Gymnix competition was the 28th edition of the International Gymnix competition. It was held in Montreal, Canada from March 7–10, 2019.

== Medal table ==
Rank	Nation	Gold	Silver	Bronze	Total
1	United States (USA)	8	8	4	20
2	Canada (CAN)	5	7	5	17
3	Spain (ESP)	2	0	0	2
4	Belgium (BEL)	1	1	2	4
5	Australia (AUS)	1	0	4	5
6	Japan (JPN)	1	0	1	2
Totals (6 entries)		18	16	16	50

== Medal winners ==
Event	Gold	Silver	Bronze
Senior
Team	United States; Sloane Blakely; Kara Eaker; Aleah Finnegan; Alyona Shchennikova	Canada; Haley de Jong; Laurie Denommée; Isabela Onyshko; Emma Spence	Australia; Romi Brown; Elena Chipizubov; Emma Nedov; Kate Sayer
Individual all-around	Kara Eaker (USA)	Alyona Shchennikova (USA)	Azuki Kokufugata (JPN)
Vault	Aleah Finnegan (USA)	Haley de Jong (CAN)	—N/a
Uneven Bars	Ana Padurariu (CAN)	Alyona Shchennikova (USA)	Emma Nedov (AUS)
Balance Beam	Kara Eaker (USA)	Sloane Blakely (USA)	Elena Chipizubov (AUS)
Floor Exercise	Azuki Kokufugata (JPN)	Haley de Jong (CAN)	Alyona Shchennikova (USA)
Junior
Team	United States; Skye Blakely; Olivia Greaves; Lillian Lippeatt; Kaylen Morgan	Belgium; Stacy Bertrandt; Charlotte Beydts; Noémie Louon; Jutta Verkest	Canada; Zoé Allaire-Bourgie; Rébéka Groulx; Clara Raposo; Rachael Riley
Individual all-around	Zoé Allaire-Bourgie (CAN)	Olivia Greaves (USA)	Skye Blakely (USA)
Vault	Skye Blakely (USA)	Olivia Greaves (USA)	Rachael Riley (CAN)
Uneven Bars	Skye Blakely (USA)	Zoé Allaire-Bourgie (CAN)	Noémie Louon (BEL)
Balance Beam	Noémie Louon (BEL)	Zoé Allaire-Bourgie (CAN)	Lillian Lippeatt (USA)
Floor Exercise	Zoé Allaire-Bourgie (CAN)	Olivia Greaves (USA)	Noémie Louon (BEL)
Challenge
Individual all-around	Violeta Sanchez (ESP)	Katelyn Rosen (USA)	Emily Walker (CAN)
Vault	Audrey Rousseau (CAN)	Kiora Peart-Williams (CAN)	Ilka Juk (CAN)
Uneven Bars	Violeta Sanchez (ESP); Erin Modaro (AUS)	Not awarded	Jessica Dowling (CAN)
Balance Beam	Laurie-Lou Vézina (CAN)	Emily Lee (USA)	Erin Modaro (AUS)
Floor Exercise	Emily Lee (USA)	Audrey Rousseau (CAN)	Sienna Robinson (USA)
