= Riley McCusker =

American artistic gymnast

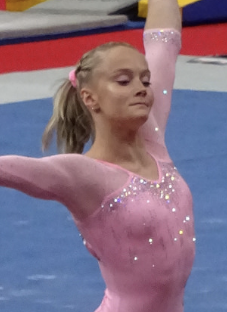
- McCusker at the 2018 U.S. National Championships

Personal information
- Full name: Riley Shannon McCusker
- Born: July 9, 2001 (age 25) New Milford, Connecticut, USA

Gymnastics career
- Discipline: Women's artistic gymnastics
- Country represented: United States; (2016–2021)
- College team: Florida Gators (2022–2026)
- Club: Arizona Sunrays; MG Elite (former)
- Head coaches: Brian Carey; Jenny Rowland
- Former coaches: Maggie Haney; Victoria Levine
Medal record
Representing the United States
World Championships
Gold medal – first place	2018 Doha	Team
Pan American Games
Gold medal – first place	2019 Lima	Team
Gold medal – first place	2019 Lima	Uneven Bars
Silver medal – second place	2019 Lima	All-Around
Bronze medal – third place	2019 Lima	Balance Beam
FIG World Cup
Event / 1st / 2nd / 3rd; All-Around World Cup / 0 / 1 / 0
Representing Florida Gators
NCAA Championships
Gold medal – first place	2026 Fort Worth	Uneven Bars
Silver medal – second place	2022 Fort Worth	Team
Silver medal – second place	2023 Fort Worth	Team
Bronze medal – third place	2026 Fort Worth	Team

Riley Shannon McCusker (born July 9, 2001) is an American artistic gymnast and a six-time member of the United States women's national gymnastics team (2016–2021). She is the 2019 Pan American Games, 2026 NCAA, and 2017 United States national uneven bars champion. In the all-around, she is the 2019 Pan American Games silver medalist and a two-time United States national bronze medalist (2017, 2018). She was a member of the gold medal-winning teams at the 2018 World Championships and the 2019 Pan American Games.

== Personal life ==
McCusker was born to Tom and Jessica McCusker in 2001, and she has three siblings. They include an older brother, and a younger brother and sister. She began gymnastics in 2008 and was homeschooled. She lived in Brielle, New Jersey, and moved to Phoenix, Arizona in 2020.

== Junior career ==
=== 2014: Level 10 ===
McCusker moved up to Level 10 in the 2014 season at age 12 – Level 10 is the highest level of the USA Gymnastics Junior Olympic program and one step below the elite level. At the time, she was training at Dynamic Gymnastics in Mohegan Lake, New York, under the tutelage of Teodora Ungureanu. At the New York State Championships, she won the all-around title in the Junior A division, as well as titles on bars, beam, and floor. Two weeks later, she competed at the 2014 Region 6 Championships where she won the all-around and vault titles in the Junior A division and qualified for the J.O. National Championships. At Nationals, held in Jackson, Mississippi, McCusker placed 30th in the all-around.

=== 2015 ===
McCusker was absent from competition throughout the entire 2015 season. During that year, she and her family moved from Connecticut to Brielle, New Jersey so that she could train at MG Elite Gymnastics in Morganville, New Jersey with coaches Maggie Haney and Victoria Levine. Her former club did not have the resources for high-level elite training. MG Elite had produced rising junior star Laurie Hernandez at the time.

=== 2016: Junior Elite ===
In January 2016, McCusker competed as a junior elite at the 2016 Parkettes Invitational in Allentown, Pennsylvania. She won the all-around title in addition to all four event titles. On February 4, 2016, she committed to the University of Florida and the Florida Gators gymnastics program. She qualified for the Junior International Elite level in March at the 2016 KPAC Cup.

In May, McCusker competed as a junior at the 2016 American Classic at the Karolyi Ranch in Huntsville, Texas and finished in a tie for fifth. On June 4 at the 2016 U.S. Classic in Hartford, Connecticut, she placed ninth in the all-around and qualified to the U.S. National Championships.

At the 2016 U.S. National Championships in St. Louis, Missouri, McCusker was in second place in the junior all-around after day one of competition with a 56.450. She maintained her placement on Day 2, winning the silver medal in the all-around with a combined total score of 112.000. She also won the silver medal on bars, beam, and floor. Consequently, she was named to the U.S. Junior National Team.

== Senior career ==
=== 2017 ===
In February McCusker was named as the wildcard athlete for the 2017 AT&T American Cup, an FIG event held on March 4 at the Prudential Center in Newark, New Jersey. McCusker represented the United States alongside 2016 Olympic alternate Ragan Smith. In her senior international debut, McCusker placed 5th overall with a 52.966, behind Kim Bui of Germany, Mélanie de Jesus dos Santos of France, Asuka Teramoto of Japan, and Smith, after a fall off of the uneven bars and a scary fall on her beam dismount, landing on her neck. Despite her struggles on bars and beam, McCusker recorded the second highest scores of the competition (behind Smith) on vault and floor.

In April, McCusker competed at the City of Jesolo Trophy in Italy, where she won the all-around gold medal with a score of 56.600, finishing ahead of Rebeca Andrade of Brazil. She also helped the U.S. win the team gold medal, and she won the gold medal on beam and the silver medal on bars behind Elena Eremina of Russia. After returning from Italy, McCusker suffered both an ankle injury and a wrist injury and was forced to stop regular training for a few months. At the end of July, she competed at the 2017 U.S. Classic. Due to her injury, she did not compete at her highest level and placed eighth on bars, thirteenth on beam, and fourth on floor.

In August at the 2017 U.S. National Championships, McCusker won the bronze medal in the all-around behind Ragan Smith and Jordan Chiles. She became the uneven bars national champion and won the silver medal on beam behind Smith. She also tied for fourth place on floor.

Due to her results at the City of Jesolo Trophy and the National Championships, McCusker was placed on the nominative roster for the 2017 World Championships, but in September she was once again injured and had to withdraw from the Worlds Selection Camp, relinquishing her chance at making that year's World team.

=== 2018 ===
In June, McCusker competed at the Brestyan's National Qualifier, where she had the highest score on uneven bars and the second highest score on balance beam. She then competed on only two events at the American Classic on July 7. She won the silver medal on beam behind Kara Eaker with a score of 14.000, and she placed seventh on bars after scoring 13.500 with a fall. On July 28, she competed at the 2018 U.S. Classic where she won the silver medal in the all-around and on balance beam, behind Simone Biles on both. She also won the gold medal on bars, one tenth of a point ahead of Alyona Shchennikova, and she placed fourth on floor behind Biles, Jade Carey, and Morgan Hurd.

In August at the 2018 U.S. National Championships, McCusker won the bronze medal in the all-around behind Biles and Morgan Hurd. She also won the silver medal on bars behind Biles, the bronze medal on beam behind Biles and Kara Eaker, and she placed seventh on floor. In October, McCusker participated in the World Team Selection Camp. She placed first on bars, second in the all-around behind Biles, second on beam behind Eaker, third on floor behind Biles and Grace McCallum, and seventh on vault. The following day, she was named to the 2018 World team alongside Biles, Hurd, McCallum, Eaker, and alternate Ragan Smith.

During the qualification round at the 2018 World Championships, McCusker placed eighth in the all-around after falling off beam and having a sub-par bars performance. She did not qualify to the All-Around Final due to teammates Biles and Hurd placing higher than her. During the Team Final, McCusker competed on bars and beam. She rebounded from her troubles in the qualification round to contribute scores of 14.500 on bars and 13.733 on beam towards the U.S. team's total. Her bars score was the second highest of the day behind Biles and tied with two-time Olympic bars champion Aliya Mustafina. The U.S. won the gold medal with a score of 171.629, 8.766 points ahead of second place Russia, beating previous margin of victory records set in the open-ended code of points era at the 2014 World Championships (6.693) and the 2016 Olympic Games (8.209).

=== 2019 ===
In February, USA Gymnastics announced that McCusker was selected to compete at the Birmingham World Cup in March. There, she won the silver medal in the all-around behind Russian gymnast Aliya Mustafina after counting falls on vault and beam. She recorded the highest scores on bars and floor.

In June, after the conclusion of the American Classic, McCusker was named as one of the eight athletes being considered for the team that would compete at the 2019 Pan American Games, along with Sloane Blakely, Kara Eaker, Aleah Finnegan, Morgan Hurd, Shilese Jones, Sunisa Lee, and Leanne Wong.

In July at the 2019 U.S. Classic, McCusker won the silver medal in the all-around behind Simone Biles with a score of 57.900. In addition, she won the bronze medal on bars behind Hurd and Lee, the silver medal on beam behind Eaker, and she placed fifth on floor behind Biles, Jade Carey, Grace McCallum, and Eaker. After the competition, she was officially named to the 2019 Pan American Games team alongside Eaker, Finnegan, Hurd, and Wong.

At the 2019 Pan American Games, Riley competed on all four events during the team final/qualification round. She contributed scores on bars, beam, and floor to the U.S. team's gold medal-winning performance. She qualified to the all-around final in first place with a total of 57.050, just over three tenths ahead of Eaker. Additionally, she also qualified to the uneven bars and floor exercise finals in first place and the balance beam final in second place behind Eaker. During the all-around final, McCusker won the silver medal behind Ellie Black of Canada after she fell off bars while performing her Ricna. On the first day of event finals, McCusker rebounded from her fall in the all-around to win the gold medal on bars ahead of Wong and Black. On the second day of event finals, McCusker won the bronze medal on beam behind Eaker and Black after she fell on her dismount, and she placed fifth on floor after going out of bounds twice.

At the 2019 U.S. National Championships, McCusker competed on all four events on the first day of competition and was in second place on balance beam behind Biles and in fourth place in the all-around behind Biles, Sunisa Lee, and Jade Carey after falling off the uneven bars. On the second day of competition, she competed on vault and uneven bars before her coach decided to pull her from the remaining two events due to McCusker feeling sick to her stomach. She ended up placing seventh on uneven bars, tied with Jordan Chiles. She was added to the national team for the fourth time.

McCusker was one of fifteen gymnasts invited to worlds selection camp and was a frontrunner to make the team. However, one day before the first day of camp, it was announced she had withdrawn from contention due to a case of "mild rhabdomyolysis".

In November McCusker signed her National Letter of Intent with the Florida Gators, starting in the 2020–21 school year.

=== 2020 ===
In February, McCusker's coach Maggie Haney was suspended pending the outcome of a hearing into alleged abuse. As a result, McCusker announced on Instagram that she would finish her elite career training at Arizona Sunrays alongside fellow national team member Jade Carey. It was later revealed that McCusker testified against Haney via a letter read at the hearing, with their relationship starting to worsen after McCusker's loss to Aliya Mustafina at the 2019 Birmingham World Cup.

In May, McCusker announced that she will defer attending the University of Florida until after the Olympic Games, which were postponed until 2021 due to the COVID-19 pandemic, starting in the 2021–22 school year.

In November, news broke that McCusker had sued her former coaches, Maggie Haney and Victoria Levine, for negligence, intentional infliction of emotional distress, and assault. McCusker cited how Haney forced her to train with an injured wrist in April 2017, an injured hamstring and a fractured ischium in the months leading up to the 2017 World Championships, foot fractures in early 2018, a torn supraspinous ligament in early 2019, and forced McCusker to train and compete at the 2019 U.S. Classic and 2019 Pan American Games while being diagnosed with exercise-induced rhabdomyolysis.

=== 2021 ===
McCusker returned to gymnastics at the 2021 Winter Cup, marking her first competition since switching gyms to Arizona Sunrays. She competed every event but floor exercise, finishing second on bars behind reigning national champion on the event, Sunisa Lee. The following month at a National Team camp McCusker was named to the National Team for the fifth time. In May McCusker competed at the U.S. Classic. She got injured during the first rotation after a bad landing on vault and withdrew from the rest of the competition. At the National Championships McCusker only competed on uneven bars. She finished second behind Sunisa Lee, achieving the top score on the apparatus on day 2 of the competition. As a result, she was added to the national team and selected to compete at the upcoming Olympic Trials. At the Olympic Trials McCusker finished fourth on uneven bars after falling off the apparatus on day two of the competition; she was not added to the Olympic team.

== NCAA career ==
=== 2022 ===
McCusker made her NCAA debut on January 7, 2022 in a quad meet against Rutgers, Northern Illinois, and Texas Women's. She only competed on the uneven bars where she scored a 9.825 to help Florida win the meet.

In a quad meet with Rutgers, North Carolina State, and Pennsylvania, McCusker earned a 9.825 on uneven bars and anchored with her first balance beam performance with a 9.850 helping the Gators dominate,

McCusker competed only on uneven bars at the 2022 SEC Gymnastics Championship posting a 9.750 helping Florida post their second-highest team title. The Gators are 11-time SEC Championship meet winners.

In her only event in the NCAA Championship final, McCusker was short on a handstand on uneven bars and scored low at 9.4125. Florida had some minor misses overall with a deficit of 0.1125 behind Oklahoma.

McCusker was recognized not only as a Women's Collegiate Gymnastics Association (WCGA) Scholastic All-America Honors but one of 230 gymnasts who achieved a 4.0 GPA. She was also recognized as being on the SEC First-Year Academic Honor Roll, and being one of 5 student-athletes who earned 4.0s in their first year.

=== 2023 ===
On March 14, she was named SEC Specialist of the Week after posting a 9.95 on the balance beam and a 9.925 on the uneven bars during a quad meeting held at Texas Woman's University. McCusker shared her first collegiate event win with Washington's Kennedi Davis on the balance beam. She tied second on uneven bars, sharing with others.

At the 2023 SEC Gymnastics Championship, McCusker scored 9.900s on both uneven bars and balance beam helping Florida to win its second consecutive SEC title. McCusker earned All-American second team honors for her 9.900 on the uneven bars in the NCAA semifinal. She has been consistently part of the uneven bars lineups earned 9.900 or better, six of those times.

No. 2 Florida advances to the NCAA Championships team final where they finish second behind No. 1 Oklahoma. McCusker helped Florida post its highest team total at the NCAA finals with a 9.9375 on balance beam and anchored the uneven bars rotation with a 9.925s.

McCusker was recognized as a 2023 WCGA Scholastic All-America Honors requiring her to have an overal GPA odf 3.5+. She also earned a place on the 2023 SEC Winter Academic Honor Roll with a GPA of 3.0+ or higher,

=== 2024 ===
After experiencing an ankle injury in November 2023, McCusker medically redshirted her junior year.

McCusker was yet again recognized as a 2024 WCGA Scholastic All-America Honors must have a consistent 3.5+ GPA. She also earned a place on the 2024 SEC Winter Academic Honor Roll with a GPA of 3.0+ or higher.

=== 2025 ===
McCusker earned her first collegiate perfect ten on the uneven bars at the 2025 SEC Championships, sharing the uneven bars title with her Gators teammate Leanne Wong and Missouri's Mara Titarsolej. McCusker is the 25th Gator to score a perfect 10 in gymnastics competition. Florida went to finish third behind no. 2 LSU and no. 1 Oklahama.

In the early rounds of the 2025 NCAA women's gymnastics tournament, Florida won the Tuscaloosa Regional with help from McCusker who anchored the uneven bars lineup with a 9.925. At the semifinals, McCusker's score of 9.8625 on uneven bars combined with Florida's lesser efforts on vault would not advance them in to the NCAA finals.

McCusker was recognized as a 2025 WCGA Scholastic All-America Honors must have a consistent 3.5+ GPA. She also earned a place on the 2025 SEC Winter Academic Honor Roll with a GPA of 3.0+ or higher.

=== 2026 ===
McCusker confirmed her return to Florida for a final season on Instagram in July 2025. At the 2026 NCAA Championships she outright won the uneven bars title with a score of 9.9875, the highest score on any apparatus of the day.

=== Regular season ranking ===
Season	All-around	Vault	Uneven bars	Balance beam	Floor exercise
2022	N/A	N/A	158th	N/A	N/A
2023	N/A	N/A	N/A	N/A	N/A
2025	N/A	N/A	67th	N/A	N/A
2026	N/A	N/A	5th	N/A	N/A

=== Career perfect 10.0 ===
Season	Date	Event	Meet
2025	March 22, 2025	Uneven bars	SEC Championships

== Selected competitive skills ==
Apparatus	Name	Description	Difficulty (Note: Valid for the 2017-2020 Code of Points)	Performed
Vault	Baitova	Yurchenko entry, laid out salto backwards with two twists	5.4	2017–21
Uneven Bars	Chow ½	Stalder Shaposhnikova transition with ½ twist to high bar	E	2018–19
Uneven Bars	Ricna	Stalder to counter reversed straddled hecht over high bar	E	2017–21
Uneven Bars	Van Leeuwen	Toe-On Shaposhnikova transition with ½ twist to high bar	E	2017–21
Uneven Bars	Double front, ½ out	Dismount: Front double tuck with ½ twist	E	2021
Uneven Bars	Downie	Stalder to counter reversed piked hecht over high bar	F	2017, 2021
Balance Beam	Layout	Laid out salto backwards with legs together (to two feet)	E	2019
Balance Beam	Mitchell	1080° (3/1) turn in tuck stand on one leg	E	2017–21
Floor Exercise	Mukhina	Full Twisting (1/1) double tucked salto backwards	E	2017–19
Floor Exercise	Mitchell	1080° (3/1) turn in tuck stand on one leg	E	2017–19
Floor Exercise	Piked Full-In	Full-twisting (1/1) double piked salto backwards	E	2018
Floor Exercise	Double Layout	Double laid out salto backwards	F	

== Competitive history ==
Competitive history of Riley McCusker at the elite level
Year	Event	Team	AA	VT	UB	BB	FX
2016	American Classic (junior)		5				
2016	U.S. Classic (junior)		9		4		
2016	P&G National Championships (junior)		2nd place, silver medalist(s)		2nd place, silver medalist(s)	2nd place, silver medalist(s)	2nd place, silver medalist(s)
2017	American Cup		5				
2017	City of Jesolo Trophy	1st place, gold medalist(s)	1st place, gold medalist(s)		2nd place, silver medalist(s)	1st place, gold medalist(s)	
2017	U.S. Classic				8	13	4
2017	P&G National Championships		3rd place, bronze medalist(s)		1st place, gold medalist(s)	2nd place, silver medalist(s)	4
2018	Brestyan's National Qualifier				1st place, gold medalist(s)	2nd place, silver medalist(s)	
2018	American Classic				7	2nd place, silver medalist(s)	
2018	U.S. Classic		2nd place, silver medalist(s)		1st place, gold medalist(s)	2nd place, silver medalist(s)	4
2018	U.S. Nationals Championships		3rd place, bronze medalist(s)		2nd place, silver medalist(s)	3rd place, bronze medalist(s)	7
2018	Worlds Team Selection Camp		2nd place, silver medalist(s)	7	1st place, gold medalist(s)	2nd place, silver medalist(s)	3rd place, bronze medalist(s)
2018	Doha World Championships	1st place, gold medalist(s)					
2019	Birmingham World Cup		2nd place, silver medalist(s)				
2019	U.S. Classic		2nd place, silver medalist(s)		3rd place, bronze medalist(s)	2nd place, silver medalist(s)	5
2019	Lima Pan American Games	1st place, gold medalist(s)	2nd place, silver medalist(s)		1st place, gold medalist(s)	3rd place, bronze medalist(s)	5
2019	U.S. National Championships				7		
2021	Winter Cup			10	2nd place, silver medalist(s)	19	
2021	U.S. National Championships				2nd place, silver medalist(s)		
2021	Olympic Trials				4		

Competitive history of Riley McCusker at the NCAA level
Year	Event	Team	AA	VT	UB	BB	FX
2022	SEC Championships	1st place, gold medalist(s)			40		
2022	NCAA Championships	2nd place, silver medalist(s)					
2023	SEC Championships	1st place, gold medalist(s)			8	9	
2023	NCAA Championships	2nd place, silver medalist(s)			18	52	
2025	SEC Championships	3rd place, bronze medalist(s)			(gold) (Note: Shared with Leanne Wong and Mara Titarsolej)		
2025	NCAA Championships	7			30		
2026	SEC Championships	1st place, gold medalist(s)					
2026	NCAA Championships	3rd place, bronze medalist(s)			1st place, gold medalist(s)		

== Floor music ==
Year	Music Title
2017–18	This Is Halloween
2019	Diabolo
