= 2018 U.S. National Gymnastics Championships =

- Venue: TD Garden
- Location: Boston, Massachusetts, U.S.
- Date: August 16, 2018—August 19, 2018

The 2018 U.S. National Gymnastics Championships is the 55th edition of the U.S. National Gymnastics Championships. The competition was held from August 16–19, 2018 at the TD Garden in Boston, Massachusetts.

== Competition schedule ==
The competition featured Senior and Junior competitions for both women's and men's disciplines. The competition was as follows:

- Thursday, August 16: Men's gymnastics – 1:30 p.m., juniors, and 7:30 p.m., seniors
- Friday, August 17: Women's gymnastics – 1:30 p.m., juniors, and 7:30 p.m., seniors
- Saturday, August 18: Men's gymnastics – 10:30 a.m., juniors, and 3:30 p.m., seniors
- Sunday, August 19: Women's gymnastics – 1:30 p.m., juniors, and 7:30 p.m., seniors

== Sponsorship ==
Procter & Gamble, a multinational consumer goods company and sponsor of the previous National Championships ended their sponsorship in late 2017.

== Medalists ==
Event	Gold	Silver	Bronze
Senior Women
Individual all-around	Simone Biles	Morgan Hurd	Riley McCusker
Vault	Simone Biles	Jordan Chiles	Jade Carey
Uneven bars	Simone Biles	Riley McCusker	Morgan Hurd
Balance beam	Simone Biles	Kara Eaker	Riley McCusker
Floor	Simone Biles	Jade Carey	Morgan Hurd
Junior Women
Individual all-around	Leanne Wong	Kayla DiCello	Sunisa Lee
Vault	Kayla DiCello	Leanne Wong	Skye Blakely
Uneven bars	Sunisa Lee	Leanne Wong	Kayla DiCello
Balance beam	Konnor McClain	Sunisa Lee Ciena Alipio	—
Floor	Leanne Wong	Skye Blakely	Kayla DiCello
Senior Men
Individual all-around	Sam Mikulak	Yul Moldauer	Allan Bower
Floor	Sam Mikulak	Yul Moldauer	Kanji Oyama
Pommel horse	Alec Yoder	Allan Bower	Ellis Mannon
Rings	Trevor Howard	Alex Diab	Yul Moldauer
Vault	Anton Stephenson	Yul Moldauer	Colin VanWicklen
Parallel bars	Sam Mikulak	Donothan Bailey	Yul Moldauer
Horizontal bar	Sam Mikulak	Donothan Bailey	Colin VanWicklen
Junior Men (17–18)
Individual all-around	Brandon Briones	Riley Loos	Spencer Goodell
Junior Men (15–16)
Individual all-around	Isaiah Drake Fuzzy Benas Justin Ah Chow	—	

== Women's national team ==
The top 6 all-around females automatically made the national team. For seniors, this consisted of Simone Biles, Morgan Hurd, Riley McCusker, Grace McCallum, Shilese Jones, and Jade Carey. Additionally, 7th and 8th-place finishers, Kara Eaker and Trinity Thomas, were also named to the team. For juniors, Leanne Wong, Kayla DiCello, Sunisa Lee, Skye Blakely, Konnor McClain, and Olivia Greaves were the top 6 finishers.

== Participants ==
The following individuals participated in the competition:

=== Seniors ===
- Shania Adams – Plain City, Ohio (Buckeye Gymnastics)
- Simone Biles – Spring, Texas (World Champions Centre)
- Sloane Blakely – Frisco, Texas (WOGA)
- Luisa Blanco – Little Elm, Texas (WOGA)
- Jade Carey – Phoenix, Arizona (Arizona Sunrays)
- Jordan Chiles – Vancouver, Washington (Naydenov)
- Audrey Davis – Frisco, Texas (WOGA)
- Olivia Dunne – Hillsdale, New Jersey (ENA Paramus)
- Kara Eaker – Grain Valley, Missouri (GAGE)
- Margzetta Frazier – Sicklerville, New Jersey (UCLA)
- Jaylene Gilstrap – McKinney, Texas (Metroplex)
- Morgan Hurd – Middletown, Delaware (First State)
- Maddie Johnston – Boyds, Maryland (Hill's Gymnastics)
- Shilese Jones – Westerville, Ohio (Future Gymnastics Academy)
- Adeline Kenlin – Iowa City, Iowa (IGN)
- ~~Emma Malabuyo~~ – Flower Mound, Texas (Texas Dreams)
- Grace McCallum – Isanti, Minnesota (Twin City Twisters)
- Riley McCusker – Brielle, New Jersey (MG Elite)
- ~~Maile O'Keefe~~ – Las Vegas, Nevada (Salcianu Elite)
- Alyona Shchennikova – Evergreen, Colorado (5280)
- Ragan Smith – Lewisville, Texas (Texas Dreams)
- Deanne Soza – Coppell, Texas (Texas Dreams)
- Trinity Thomas – York, Pennsylvania (Prestige)
- ~~Madelyn Williams~~ – Vacaville, California (San Mateo)

=== Juniors ===
- Ciena Alipio – San Jose, California (West Valley Gymnastics)
- Sydney Barros – Lewisville, Texas (Texas Dreams)
- Skye Blakely – Frisco, Texas (WOGA)
- Jordan Bowers – Lincoln, Nebraska (Solid Rock)
- ~~Sophia Butler~~ – Houston, Texas (Discover)
- Kailin Chio – Henderson, Nevada (Gymcats)
- Claire Dean – Piedmont, California (Head Over Heels)
- Kayla DiCello – Boyds, Maryland (Hill's Gymnastics)
- Aleah Finnegan – Lee's Summit, Missouri (GAGE)
- Karis German – Spring, Texas (World Champions Centre)
- Zoe Gravier – Holmdel, New Jersey (MG Elite)
- Olivia Greaves – Staten Island, New York (MG Elite)
- Selena Harris – Henderson, Nevada (Gymcats)
- Alexis Jeffrey – Warrensburg, Missouri (GAGE)
- Levi Jung-Ruivivar – Woodland Hills, California (Paramount Elite)
- Sunisa Lee – St. Paul, Minnesota (Midwest Gymnastics Center)
- Lilly Lippeatt – Mason, Ohio (Cincinnati Gymnastics)
- Konnor McClain – Cross Lanes, West Virginia (Revolution)
- Sydney Morris – Bowie, Maryland (First State)
- Brenna Neault – Rancho Cucamonga, California (Precision)
- Katelyn Rosen – Boerne, Texas (Mavericks at Artemovs)
- JaFree Scott – Independence, Missouri (GAGE)
- ~~Ui Soma~~ – Belmont, California (San Mateo)
- Tori Tatum – Chanhassen, Minnesota (Twin City Twisters)
- Leanne Wong – Overland Park, Kansas (GAGE)
