= Lilly Lippeatt =

American artistic gymnast

- Born: August 28, 2004 (age 22) Cincinnati, Ohio, U.S.

Gymnastics career
- Discipline: Women's artistic gymnastics
- Country represented: United States; (2019–2021)
- College team: Clemson Tigers (2024–27)
- Club: Cincinnati Gymnastics Academy
- Head coach: Mary Lee Tracy
- Assistant coach: Cassie Whitcomb
Medal record
Representing the United States

Lillian Lippeatt (born August 28, 2004) is an American artistic gymnast. She became a United States national team member in 2019 and made her international debut at the 2019 Gymnix International.

== Career ==
=== Junior ===
Lippeatt began gymnastics in 2007. Her first national competition was the 2015 HOPES Championships in Chicago, where she placed first on uneven bars and fifth all-around.

In March 2017, Lippeatt competed at the Nastia Liukin Cup, placing first on floor exercise and beam, and seventh all-around. That same month, Lilly went on and qualified as a Junior International Elite at KPAC Elite qualifier. In July 2017 she competed at the US Classic, placing seventh on floor and tenth all-around. She also competed at the 2017 P&G Championships. There Lippeatt ranked 15th all-around, 25th on vault, 24th on uneven bars, 14th on balance beam and tenth on floor exercise.

In August 2018, Lippeatt competed at the US Gymnastics Championships in Boston and placed 21st all-around.

She joined the United States' junior national team on February 24, 2019. In March 2019, she made her international debut at Gymnix International alongside fellow American juniors Skye Blakely, Olivia Greaves and Kaylen Morgan. The American team won the junior team final. Individually Lippeatt finished fifth all-around and won bronze on balance beam. In July 2019, she competed at the GK US Classic, placing ninth all-around. At the US Gymnastics Championships in Kansas City that August, Lippeatt finished fifth on uneven bars and floor exercise, and eighth all-around. Lilly was named Region 5 Elite Athlete of the year September 2019.

=== Senior ===
Lippeatt joined the senior national team on March 3, 2020. She made her senior debut on March 6–8 at Gymnix International. With teammates MyKayla Skinner, Faith Torrez and Emily Lee, she won team gold and individually placed eighth on balance beam.

February 28, Lilly competed in the 2021 Winter Cup Senior Division. She had a great showing and tied for third on floor with Shilese Jones and finished up fourth all-around. This earned her a spot on the Senior National team for the second time.
