= Grace McCallum =

American artistic gymnast

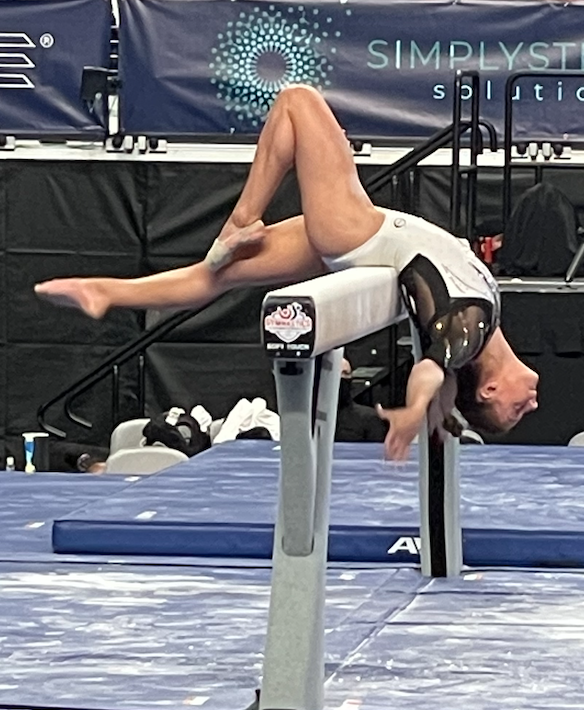
- McCallum at the 2021 US National Championships

Personal information
- Full name: Grace Ann McCallum
- Born: October 30, 2002 (age 24) Cambridge, Minnesota, U.S.
- Height: 5 ft 3 in (160 cm)

Gymnastics career
- Discipline: Women's artistic gymnastics
- Country represented: United States; (2018–2022)
- College team: Utah Red Rocks (2022–2025)
- Club: Twin City Twisters
- Head coach: Sarah Jantzi
Medal record
Event	1st	2nd	3rd
Olympic Games	0	1	0
World Championships	2	0	0
NCAA Championships	0	5	3
Total	2	6	3
Representing the United States
Olympic Games
Silver medal – second place	2020 Tokyo	Team
World Championships
Gold medal – first place	2018 Doha	Team
Gold medal – first place	2019 Stuttgart	Team
Pacific Rim Championships
Gold medal – first place	2018 Medellín	Team
Gold medal – first place	2018 Medellín	All-Around
Silver medal – second place	2018 Medellín	Vault
Silver medal – second place	2018 Medellín	Floor Exercise
Pan American Championships
Gold medal – first place	2018 Lima	Team
Gold medal – first place	2018 Lima	All-Around
Gold medal – first place	2018 Lima	Uneven Bars
Bronze medal – third place	2018 Lima	Vault
Bronze medal – third place	2018 Lima	Balance Beam
FIG World Cup
Event	1st	2nd	3rd
All-Around World Cup	0	1	0
Representing Utah Red Rocks
NCAA Championships
Silver medal – second place	2023 Fort Worth	Uneven Bars
Silver medal – second place	2025 Fort Worth	All-Around
Silver medal – second place	2025 Fort Worth	Vault
Silver medal – second place	2025 Fort Worth	Uneven Bars
Silver medal – second place	2025 Fort Worth	Floor Exercise
Bronze medal – third place	2022 Fort Worth	Team
Bronze medal – third place	2023 Fort Worth	Team
Bronze medal – third place	2024 Fort Worth	Team

Grace McCallum
Current position
- Title: Assistant coach
- Team: Minnesota Golden Gophers
- Conference: Big Ten

Biographical details
- Education: University of Utah

Coaching career (HC unless noted)
- 2026: Utah (Student Asst.)
- 2027–present: Minnesota (Asst.)

Grace Ann McCallum (born October 30, 2002) is an American former artistic gymnast and current assistant coach for the Minnesota Golden Gophers women's gymnastics team. She represented the United States at the 2020 Summer Olympics and won a silver medal in the team event. She is the 2018 Pan American and 2018 Pacific Rim individual all-around champion, the 2018 Pan American uneven bars champion, and was a member of the U.S. gymnastics team that won gold at the 2018 and 2019 World Championships and the 2018 Pan American Championships.

== Personal life ==
McCallum was born in Cambridge, Minnesota to Sandra and Edward McCallum. She is one of seven children and has a German Shepherd named Bella. She finished high school online through Connections Academy. McCallum is a devout Roman Catholic.

== Elite gymnastics career ==
=== 2017 ===
In 2017, McCallum competed at the 2017 U.S. Classic where she placed third in the all-around and first on vault in the junior division. At Nationals, she placed 11th in the all-around and fourth on vault.

=== 2018 ===
McCallum turned senior 2018 and was officially added to the senior national team when she was named to the team to compete at the 2018 Pacific Rim Gymnastics Championships. There she won gold in the team and all-around finals and won silver on vault and floor exercise. McCallum also competed at the 2018 City of Jesolo Trophy where she placed fifth in the all-around, fifth on vault, and third on floor exercise.

In early July, McCallum competed at the American Classic, where she only competed on uneven bars and balance beam. She finished second and ninth respectively.

Later that month, McCallum competed at the GK US Classic, where she placed eleventh in the all-around. She also placed eighteenth on bars, twelfth on beam, and tied for seventh on floor with Shania Adams.

In August, McCallum competed at the National Championships where she placed fourth in the all-around, behind Simone Biles, Morgan Hurd, and Riley McCusker. She also finished fourth on floor exercise, sixth on uneven bars, and fifth on balance beam. On August 20 McCallum was named to the team to compete at the Pan American Championships alongside Jade Carey, Trinity Thomas, Kara Eaker, and Shilese Jones. There she won gold in the team finals, all-around, and uneven bars and won bronze on vault and balance beam. She had the fourth highest score on floor exercise. Her all-around score of 57.000 during the team final was the second-highest international score in the world in 2018, behind only all-around champion Biles.

In October, McCallum participated in the Worlds Team Selection Camp. During the competition, she placed second on floor exercise behind Biles, third in the all-around behind Biles and McCusker, fifth on balance beam and vault, and seventh on uneven bars. The following day she was named to the team to compete at the 2018 World Championships alongside Biles, Hurd, McCusker, Eaker, and alternate Ragan Smith.

During qualifications the US qualified in first place to the team final. Individually McCallum qualified as the second reserve to the vault final and placed seventh on floor exercise, but did not qualify due to teammates Biles and Hurd scoring higher. During the team final McCallum competed on only vault and floor exercise. She contributed 14.533 and 13.633 respectively towards the USA's team total. USA won gold with a score of 171.629, 8.766 points ahead of second-place Russia, beating previous margin of victory records set in the open-ended code of points era at the 2014 World Championships (6.693) and the 2016 Olympic Games (8.209).

=== 2019 ===
In January, it was announced that McCallum would represent the US at the American Cup alongside first year senior Leanne Wong in March. There she won the silver all-around medal behind Wong and ahead of the two previous World silver all-around medalists, Ellie Black of Canada (2017) and Mai Murakami of Japan (2018), who tied for third place. At February's team training camp, McCallum placed first in the all-around ahead of the other national team members.

At the 2019 GK US Classic in July, McCallum placed third in the all-around behind Simone Biles and Riley McCusker. She also tied for third on bars with McCusker and behind Morgan Hurd and Sunisa Lee, placed fifth on beam, and tied for second on floor with Jade Carey and behind Biles. Additionally she had the fourth highest single vault score behind Biles, Carey, and MyKayla Skinner but had the highest scoring double-twisting yurchenko.

At the 2019 U.S. National Championships, McCallum competed all four events on the first day of competition but counted two falls and ended the night in ninth place, tied with MyKayla Skinner. On the second day of competition she competed all her routines cleanly and was able to make a comeback and finished the competition in third place behind Simone Biles and Sunisa Lee. She also finished in sixth on bars, eighth on beam, and fourth on floor. As a result, she was added to the national team for the third time.

In September, McCallum competed at the US World Championships trials where she placed sixth in the all-around behind Simone Biles, Sunisa Lee, Kara Eaker, MyKayla Skinner, and Jade Carey after falling off the uneven bars. On the second day of trials, she competed on bars and beam, finishing third on bars behind Lee and Biles. The following day she was named to the team to compete at the 2019 World Championships in Stuttgart alongside Biles, Lee, Eaker, Skinner, and Carey.

During the qualification round at the World Championships, McCallum helped the USA qualify to the team final in first place over five points ahead of second place China. She recorded the fifth highest all-around score despite falling on balance beam, but did not advance to the final due to teammates Biles and Lee scoring higher than her. Additionally, she placed ninth on floor exercise and tenth on uneven bars, but was not named a reserve athlete for either final due to both Biles and Lee qualifying above her on those two events. In the team final, McCallum competed on vault and uneven bars, helping the USA win the gold medal ahead of Russia and Italy, making this McCallum's second consecutive gold medal in the team final.

=== 2020 ===
In early February, it was announced that McCallum was selected to represent the United States at the Birmingham World Cup taking place in late March. However, the Birmingham World Cup was later canceled due to the COVID-19 pandemic in the United Kingdom.

In November, McCallum signed her National Letter of Intent with the University of Utah, intending to start in the 2021–22 school year.

=== 2021 ===
McCallum competed at the American Classic in April. She only competed on the balance beam where she recorded the fourth highest score. In May, McCallum competed the all-around at the U.S. Classic where she placed fourth behind Simone Biles, Jordan Chiles, and Kayla DiCello. At the National Championships McCallum finished seventh in the all-around. Additionally she won bronze on balance beam behind Biles and Sunisa Lee. As a result, she was named to the national team and selected to compete at the upcoming Olympic Trials. McCallum finished fourth at the Olympic Trials and was named to the four-person team to represent the United States at the 2020 Summer Olympics alongside Biles, Lee, and Chiles.

At the Olympic Games McCallum performed the all-around during qualifications and helped the USA qualify to the team final in second place behind the athletes from Russia. She finished qualifications in thirteenth place; however she did not advance to the final due to two-per-country limitations as Biles and Lee had placed higher. During the team final McCallum competed on all four apparatuses. After the first rotation, Biles withdrew from the competition and the United States finished second behind the Russian Olympic Committee athletes.

After the Olympics, McCallum participated in Simone Biles' Gold Over America Tour.

== Collegiate gymnastics career ==
=== 2021–22 season ===
McCallum made her NCAA debut on January 7 at the Best of Utah meet where she competed the all-around to help Utah win. She put up the highest vault score of the night, a 9.90, alongside teammate Jaedyn Rucker. The following week McCallum once again competed the all-around to help Utah win against Oklahoma. She recorded the highest all-around and floor exercise scores of the night with a 39.675 and 9.975 respectively. As a result, she was named Pac-12 freshman of the week. On February 4, in a meet against UCLA, McCallum earned her first collegiate perfect ten on the uneven bars.

At the Pac-12 Championships, McCallum helped Utah win their second consecutive team title. Individually she placed second in the all-around behind Olympic teammate Jade Carey. She earned her second perfect ten on the uneven bars to outright win the title and co-won the title on floor exercise alongside Carey.

=== Career perfect 10.0 ===
Season	Date	Event	Meet
2022	February 4, 2022	Uneven bars	Utah @ UCLA
2022	March 19, 2022	Uneven bars	Pac-12 Championships
2024	February 23, 2024	Floor exercise	Utah vs Stanford
2024	March 8, 2024	Uneven bars	Utah @ Arizona
2025	February 14, 2025	Uneven bars	Utah @ Arizona State
2025	March 15, 2025	Balance beam	Utah vs UCLA
2025	April 3, 2025	Uneven bars	Utah Regional Semifinal
2025	April 5, 2025	Uneven bars	Utah Regional Final

=== Regular season rankings ===
Season	All-Around	Vault	Uneven Bars	Balance Beam	Floor Exercise
2022	6th	20th	2nd	17th	12th
2024	N/A	N/A	10th	26th	14th
2025	9th	48th	2nd	4th	30th

== Coaching career ==
After finishing up her four years of eligibility for the Utah Red Rocks, McCallum served as a student assistant coach for the team during the 2025–2026 season. In June 2026, the University of Minnesota hired McCallum as an assistant coach for the Minnesota Golden Gophers women's gymnastics team.

== Selected competitive skills ==
Apparatus	Name	Description	Difficulty (Note: Valid for the 2022-2024 Code of Points)	Performed
Vault	Servente	Yurchenko half-on entry, tucked salto forwards with ½ twist	4.0	2018
Vault	Baitova	Yurchenko entry, laid out salto backwards with two twists	5.0	2018–21
Uneven Bars	Chow 1/2	Stalder Shaposhnikova transition with ½ twist to high bar	E	2018, 2021
Uneven Bars	Piked Jaeger	Reverse grip swing to piked salto forwards to catch high bar	E	2021
Uneven Bars	Ricna	Stalder to counter reversed straddled hecht over high bar	E	2019
Uneven Bars	Van Leeuwen	Toe-on Shaposhnikova transition with ½ twist to high bar	E	2019
Uneven Bars	Downie	Stalder to counter reversed piked hecht over high bar	F	2019–21
Balance Beam	Double Pike	Dismount: Double piked salto backwards	E	2019–21
Balance Beam	Mitchell	1080° (3/1) turn in tuck stand on one leg	E	2018–21
Floor Exercise	Mitchell	1080° (3/1) turn in tuck stand on one leg	E	2019–21
Floor Exercise	Mukhina	Full-twisting (1/1) double tucked salto backwards	E	2018–21
Floor Exercise	Triple Twist	Salto backward laid out with triple twist	E	2018–19
Floor Exercise	Silivas	Double-twisting (2/1) double tucked salto backwards	H	2018–21

== Competitive history ==
Year	Event	Team	AA	VT	UB	BB	FX
Junior
2017	U.S. Classic		3rd place, bronze medalist(s)	1st place, gold medalist(s)	16	9	5
2017	P&G National Championships		11	4	23	18	12
Senior
2018	City of Jesolo Trophy		5	5			3rd place, bronze medalist(s)
2018	Pacific Rim Championships	1st place, gold medalist(s)	1st place, gold medalist(s)	2nd place, silver medalist(s)	6	6	2nd place, silver medalist(s)
2018	American Classic				2nd place, silver medalist(s)	9	
2018	U.S. Classic		11		18	12	7
2018	U.S. National Championships		4		6	5	4
2018	Pan American Championships	1st place, gold medalist(s)	1st place, gold medalist(s)	3rd place, bronze medalist(s)	1st place, gold medalist(s)	3rd place, bronze medalist(s)	4
2018	Worlds Team Selection Camp		3rd place, bronze medalist(s)	5	7	5	2nd place, silver medalist(s)
2018	World Championships	1st place, gold medalist(s)		R2			
2019	American Cup		2nd place, silver medalist(s)				
2019	U.S. Classic		3rd place, bronze medalist(s)		3rd place, bronze medalist(s)	5	2nd place, silver medalist(s)
2019	U.S. National Championships		3rd place, bronze medalist(s)		6	8	4
2019	Worlds Team Selection Camp		6	4	11	4	6
2019	World Championships	1st place, gold medalist(s)					
2021	American Classic					4	
2021	U.S. Classic		4		15	5	5
2021	U.S. National Championships		7		19	3rd place, bronze medalist(s)	16
2021	Olympic Trials		4		5	5	4
2021	Olympic Games	2nd place, silver medalist(s)					
NCAA
2022	Pac-12 Championships	1st place, gold medalist(s)	2nd place, silver medalist(s)	6	1st place, gold medalist(s)	12	1st place, gold medalist(s)
2022	NCAA Championship	3rd place, bronze medalist(s)	14	21	49	27	7
2023	Pac-12 Championships	1st place, gold medalist(s)					
2023	NCAA Championship	3rd place, bronze medalist(s)			2nd place, silver medalist(s)		
2024	Pac-12 Championships	1st place, gold medalist(s)	2nd place, silver medalist(s)		3rd place, bronze medalist(s)		
2024	NCAA Championships	3rd place, bronze medalist(s)	17	45	33	24	18
2025	Big 12 Championships	1st place, gold medalist(s)	1st place, gold medalist(s)	1st place, gold medalist(s)	14	3rd place, bronze medalist(s)	2nd place, silver medalist(s)
2025	NCAA Championships	4	2nd place, silver medalist(s)	2nd place, silver medalist(s)	2nd place, silver medalist(s)	18	2nd place, silver medalist(s)

== Floor music ==
Year	Music Title
2019	"Hava Nagila"
2021	"Birthday - Didula / Matador - Marnik and Miami Blue"
