= Olivia Greaves =

American artistic gymnast (born 2004)

- Full name: Olivia Greaves
- Nickname: Liv
- Born: May 5, 2004 (age 22) Staten Island, New York USA

Gymnastics career
- Discipline: Women's artistic gymnastics
- Country represented: United States; (2018–2022)
- College team: Auburn Tigers
- Club: World Champions Centre; MG Elite
- Head coach: Laurent Landi
- Former coaches: Maggie Haney; Victoria Levine
Medal record
Representing the United States

Olivia Greaves (born May 5, 2004) is an American artistic gymnast and was a member of the United States women's national artistic gymnastics team (2018–2022).

== Early life ==
Greaves was born to Mary Jo and Daniel Greaves in 2004, and has three siblings. Her mother opened a gym, Athletic Edge Sports Center, shortly after Greaves' birth. She started competing with the gym when she was 5 years old. In addition to gymnastics, Greaves participated in competitive dance from 2010 to 2014 at Star Struck and was a toddler model.

== Gymnastics career ==
=== Junior Olympics ===
Greaves was part of the Junior Olympic Program and competed with her mother's gym, Athletic Edge Sports Center.

Greaves began training at MG Elite Gymnastics and competed level 8 during the 2015 season, the same gym as rising junior Laurie Hernandez. At the Level 8 New Jersey State Championships Greaves finished first in the all-around, vault, and floor exercise, finished second on the balance beam, and third on the uneven bars. In 2016 she competed at the Level 9 New Jersey State Championships where she finished first in the all-around, vault, and uneven bars, second on floor exercise, and tenth on balance beam. At the 2017 Level 10 New Jersey State Championships, Greaves finished first in the all-around, on vault, and on floor exercise, second on uneven bars, and third on balance beam.

=== Junior elite ===
Greaves started 2018 as a Level 10 gymnast. She competed at the Nastia Liukin Cup where she finished 8th in the all-around. A week later she competed at the KPAC Elite Qualifier where she earned a score 51.650 and qualified as a junior elite. In early July, Greaves competed at the American Classic where she placed fourth in the all-around behind Kayla DiCello, Konnor McClain, and Skye Blakely but first on the uneven bars. Later that month she competed at the 2018 U.S. Classic where she placed ninth in the all-around and third on floor exercise. In August Greaves competed at the 2018 U.S. National Gymnastics Championships, her first ever National Championships. She finished sixth in the all-around and as a result she was added to the Junior National Team.

In late August, Greaves verbally committed to attend the University of Florida on a gymnastics scholarship.

In early 2019 Greaves was named to the team to compete at the 2019 International Gymnix in Montreal, her first international assignment, alongside Skye Blakely, Lilly Lippeatt, and Kaylen Morgan. While there she helped the USA win team gold and won silver in the individual all-around behind Canadian Zoé Allaire-Bourgie. Individually she qualified to all four event finals and won silver on vault and floor exercise, behind Blakely and Allaire-Bourgie respectively, and placed fifth on uneven bars and balance beam.

In July Greaves competed at the 2019 U.S. Classic where she won bronze in the all-around behind Konnor McClain and Sydney Barros. She won gold on uneven bars, placed fourth on balance beam, ninth on floor exercise, and tenth on vault.

In August Greaves competed at the 2019 U.S. National Championships. After the first day of competition she recorded a score of 55.700 and was in third behind Konnor McClain and Kayla DiCello. During the second day of competition she scored a 55.150, giving her a total combined score of 110.850 which was enough to win the bronze in the all-around behind DiCello and McClain. For individual events Greaves won gold on uneven bars, placed fourth on floor exercise, and fifth on vault.

=== Senior elite ===
Greaves turned senior in 2020. She had switched gyms and started training at World Champions Centre, the gym owned by Simone Biles' family. Greaves made her senior debut in 2021 at the WOGA Classic. She finished third in the all-around behind teammates Jordan Chiles and Zoe Miller. She recorded the highest score on floor exercise and second highest on uneven bars. Greaves next competed at the 2021 Winter Cup where she had a rough performance and finished fourteenth in the all-around. The following month Greaves attended a National Team camp and participated in the verification. She recorded the third highest all-around score behind Kayla DiCello and Leanne Wong and was therefore named to the National Team.

Greaves was unable to compete at the 2021 National Championships or the Olympic Trials due to elbow fracture diagnosis, which later turned out to be a bone bruise. In July she verbally committed to compete for the Auburn Tigers gymnastics team.

In October Greaves was selected as the non-traveling alternate for the 2021 World Championships. As a result she was re-added to the national team.

== Competitive History ==
Year	Event	Team	AA	VT	UB	BB	FX
Junior
2018	American Classic		4	15	1st place, gold medalist(s)	8	3rd place, bronze medalist(s)
2018	U.S. Classic		9	12	24	6	3rd place, bronze medalist(s)
2018	U.S. National Championships		6	10	6	12	4
2019	International Gymnix	1st place, gold medalist(s)	2nd place, silver medalist(s)	2nd place, silver medalist(s)	5	5	2nd place, silver medalist(s)
2019	Jr. World Championships Trials		6				
2019	U.S. Classic		3rd place, bronze medalist(s)	10	1st place, gold medalist(s)	4	9
2019	U.S. National Championships		3rd place, bronze medalist(s)	5	1st place, gold medalist(s)	10	4
Senior
2021	WOGA Classic		3rd place, bronze medalist(s)				
2021	Winter Cup		14	18	7	26	19
2021	World Team Trials		5				
2021	Swiss Cup	DNS					
2022	U.S. National Championships				9		
