= Skye Blakely =

American artistic gymnast (born 2005)

- Blakely at the 2026 U.S. Championships

Personal information
- Full name: Skye Amiel Blakely
- Born: February 4, 2005 (age 21) Dallas, Texas, USA

Gymnastics career
- Discipline: Women's artistic gymnastics
- Country represented: United States; (2018–present)
- College team: Florida Gators (2025–28)
- Club: World Olympic Gymnastics Academy
- Head coaches: Yevgeny Marchenko and Haiou Sun
Medal record
Women's artistic gymnastics
Representing the United States
World Championships
Gold medal – first place	2022 Liverpool	Team
Gold medal – first place	2023 Antwerp	Team
Gold medal – first place	2026 Rotterdam	All-around
Silver medal – second place	2026 Rotterdam	Team
Bronze medal – third place	2026 Rotterdam	Vault
Bronze medal – third place	2026 Rotterdam	Uneven bars
Pan American Championships
Silver medal – second place	2022 Rio de Janeiro	Team
Bronze medal – third place	2022 Rio de Janeiro	All-around
Bronze medal – third place	2022 Rio de Janeiro	Floor exercise
Junior World Championships
Bronze medal – third place	2019 Győr	Team
Representing Florida Gators
NCAA Championships
Silver medal – second place	2026 Fort Worth	Uneven Bars
Bronze medal – third place	2026 Fort Worth	Team

Skye Amiel Blakely (born February 4, 2005) is an American artistic gymnast. She is the 2026 World all-around champion. She was a member of the teams who won gold at the 2022 and 2023 World Championships, silver at the 2026 World Championships, and bronze at the inaugural Junior World Championships.

== Early life ==
Blakely was born to Steven and Stephanie Blakely in 2005 in Dallas, Texas, and has one older sister, gymnast Sloane Blakely. She began gymnastics in 2008.

== Junior gymnastics career ==
=== 2018 ===
In early 2018 Blakely competed at the Buckeye National Qualifier and the WOGA Classic, where she placed sixth in the all-around. She later competed at International Gymnix where she placed fifteenth in the all-around and fifth on uneven bars. In early July, she competed at the American Classic where she placed third in the all-around behind Kayla DiCello and Konnor McClain. Later that month she competed at the 2018 U.S. Classic where she placed sixth in the all-around and third on vault. In August Blakely competed at the 2018 U.S. National Gymnastics Championships. She finished in fourth place in the all-around behind Leanne Wong, DiCello, and Sunisa Lee and won silver on floor exercise and bronze on vault. As a result she was added to the national team for the first time.

=== 2019 ===
In February Blakely was named to the team to compete at 2019 L'International Gymnix in Montreal, alongside Olivia Greaves, Lillian Lippeatt, and Kaylen Morgan. While there she helped the USA win team gold and individually she won bronze in the all-around behind Canadian Zoé Allaire-Bourgie and teammate Greaves. During event finals she won gold on vault and uneven bars. In June Blakely competed at the Junior World Championships Trials where she placed first in the all-around and was named to the team to compete at the inaugural Junior World Championships alongside Kayla DiCello and Sydney Barros. While there she helped the USA win team bronze and individually she recorded the seventh highest all-around score but did not place due to DiCello and Barros both placing higher. During event finals she placed fourth on uneven bars and fifth on floor exercise.

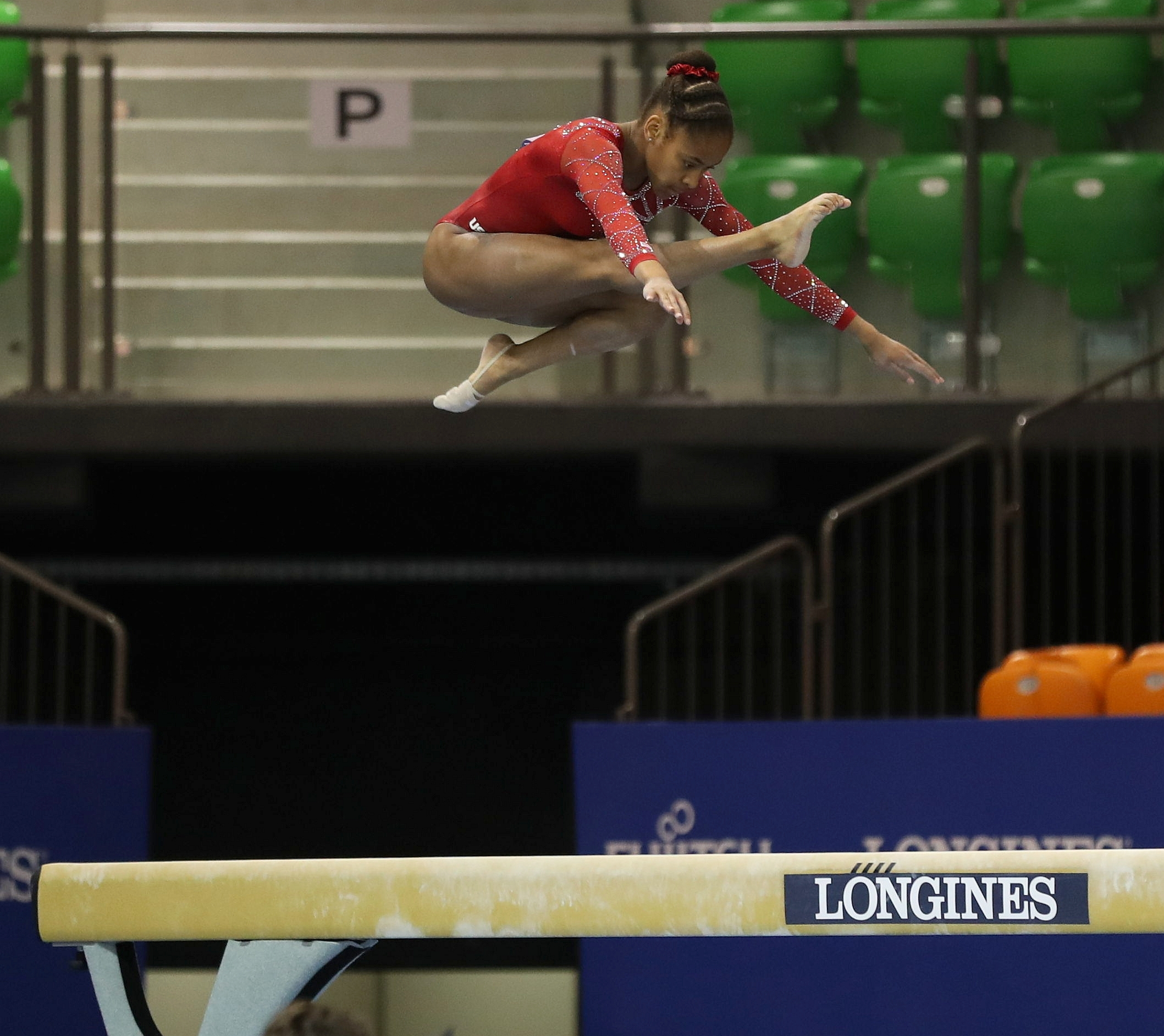
Team / all-around final

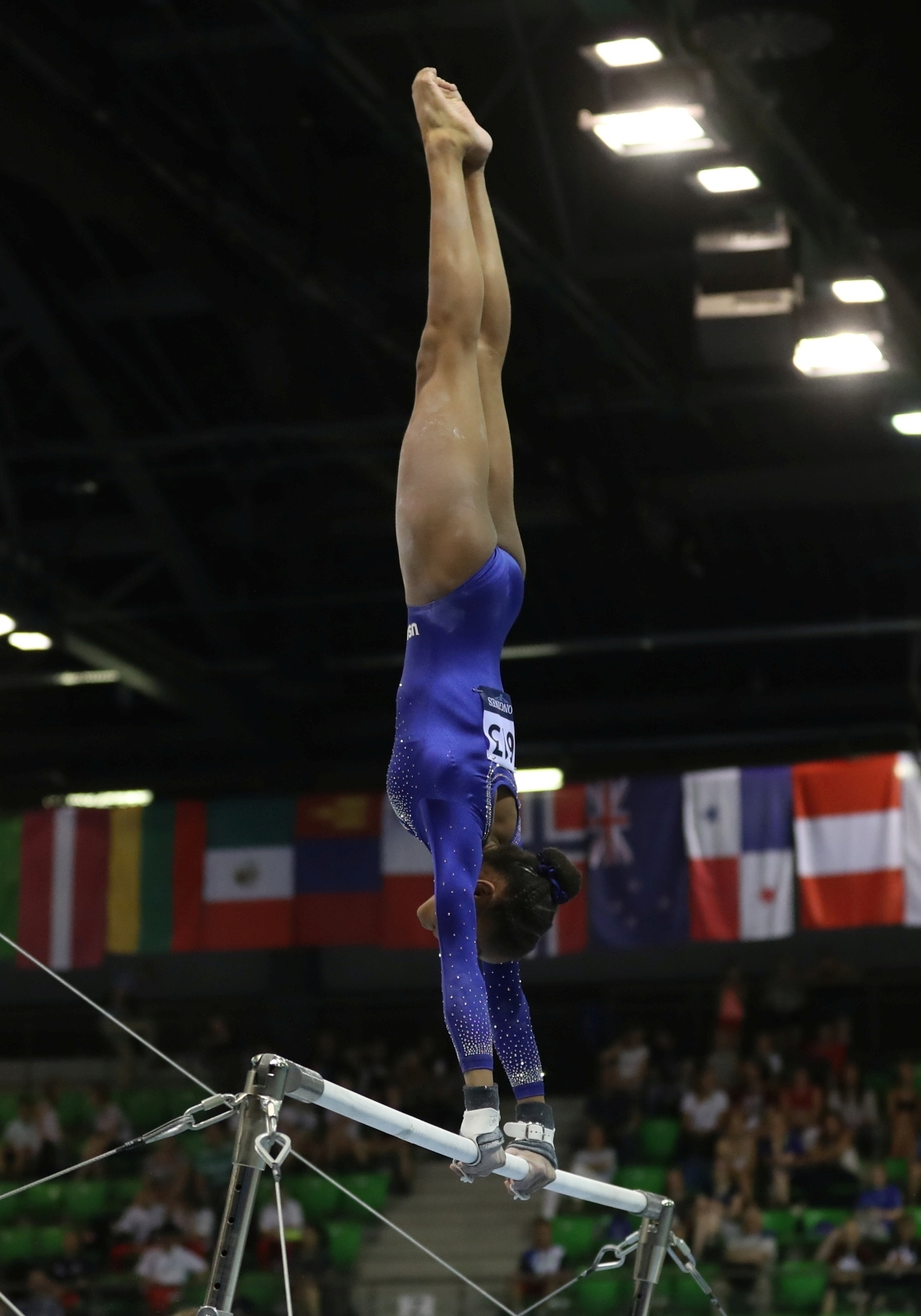
Uneven bars final

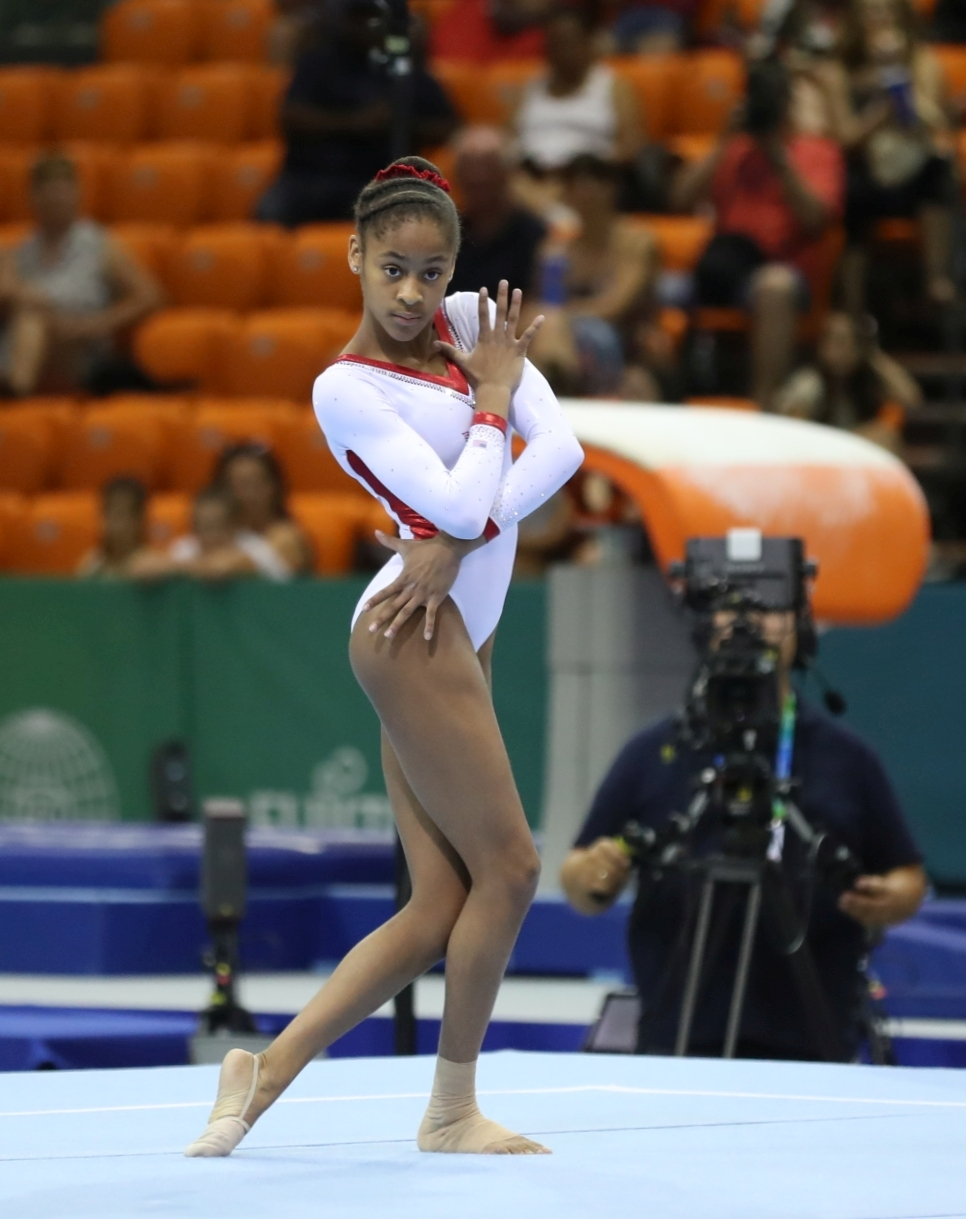
Floor exercise final

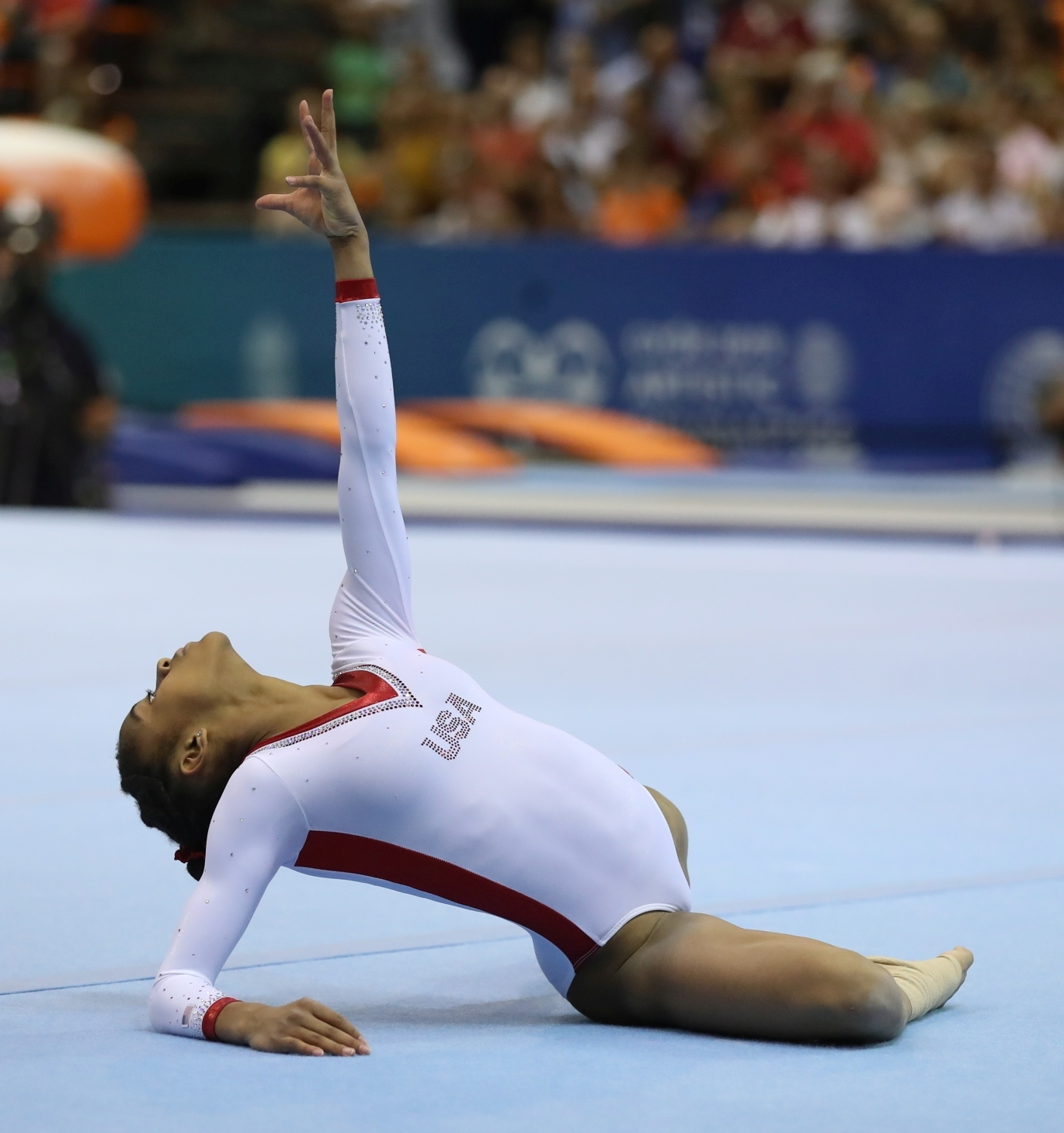
Floor exercise final

Blakely at the 2019 Junior World Championships

In July Blakely competed at the U.S. Classic where she placed fourth in the all-around behind Konnor McClain, Barros, and Greaves. She won gold on floor exercise and silver on vault.

In August Blakely competed at the U.S. National Championships where she placed fourth in the all-around. She tied for second on balance beam with Ciena Alipio and behind McClain and won bronze on floor exercise. As a result she was added to the junior national team.

=== 2020 ===
Blakely competed at the WOGA Classic in February, earning an all-around score of 57.150 to place first in the junior division and outscoring the senior division as well. In March Blakely was selected to compete at International Gymnix, taking place in Montreal alongside Konnor McClain, Kaliya Lincoln, and Katelyn Jong. While there she helped the USA win team gold and individually she won gold in the all-around, silver on vault, uneven bars, and balance beam behind McClain, and bronze on floor exercise behind McClain and Bailey Inglis of Canada.

== Senior gymnastics career ==
=== 2021 ===
Blakely made her senior debut at the 2021 Winter Cup, finishing first on balance beam and tied for eighth on floor exercise with Amari Drayton. She next competed at the American Classic where she placed first in the all-around. As a result of winning, she was re-added to the national team. Blakely next competed at the GK US Classic, placing seventh in the all-around, as well as finishing third on uneven bars behind Kayla DiCello and Jordan Chiles. At the National Championships Blakely finished seventh in the all-around. As a result, she was named to the national team and selected to compete at Olympic Trials. At the Trials Blakely was injured during vault warmups and withdrew from both nights of competition.

In September Blakely verbally committed to compete for the Florida Gators.

=== 2022 ===
Blakely returned to competition at the 2022 Winter Cup where she placed second in the all-around competition behind Konnor McClain. As a result she was selected to compete at the DTB Pokal Team Challenge in Stuttgart alongside McClain, eMjae Frazier, Nola Matthews, and Ashlee Sullivan. As a team they placed first. In July she was selected to compete at the Pan American Championships alongside Kayla DiCello, Zoe Miller, Elle Mueller, and Lexi Zeiss. On the first day of competition she won bronze in the all-around behind Flávia Saraiva of Brazil and teammate Zeiss and also on floor exercise behind DiCello and Saraiva. Additionally she placed fourth on uneven bars and seventh on balance beam. During the team final Blakely competed on all four events helping the United States win silver behind Brazil.

In October Blakely was selected to compete at the 2022 World Championships alongside Jade Carey, Jordan Chiles, Shilese Jones, and Leanne Wong, and traveling alternate Lexi Zeiss. During the qualification round Blakely helped the USA qualify to the team final in first place. Individually she qualified to the balance beam final in second place behind Ou Yushan of China. During the team final Blakely competed on the balance beam, helping the USA win their sixth consecutive team gold medal. During event finals Blakely placed fifth on balance beam after falling off the apparatus.

In November Blakely officially signed her National Letter of Intent with the Florida Gators with the intention of deferring enrollment until after the 2024 Olympic Games.

=== 2023 ===
In September, Blakely won silver medals on vault, uneven bars, and balance beam at the U.S. national championships. She was selected to represent the United States at the 2023 World Championships alongside Simone Biles, Shilese Jones, Joscelyn Roberson, Leanne Wong, and alternate Kayla DiCello. During qualifications she competed on uneven bars and balance to help the USA qualify to the team final in first place. During the team final she competed on uneven bars and helped the USA win their seventh consecutive World team title.

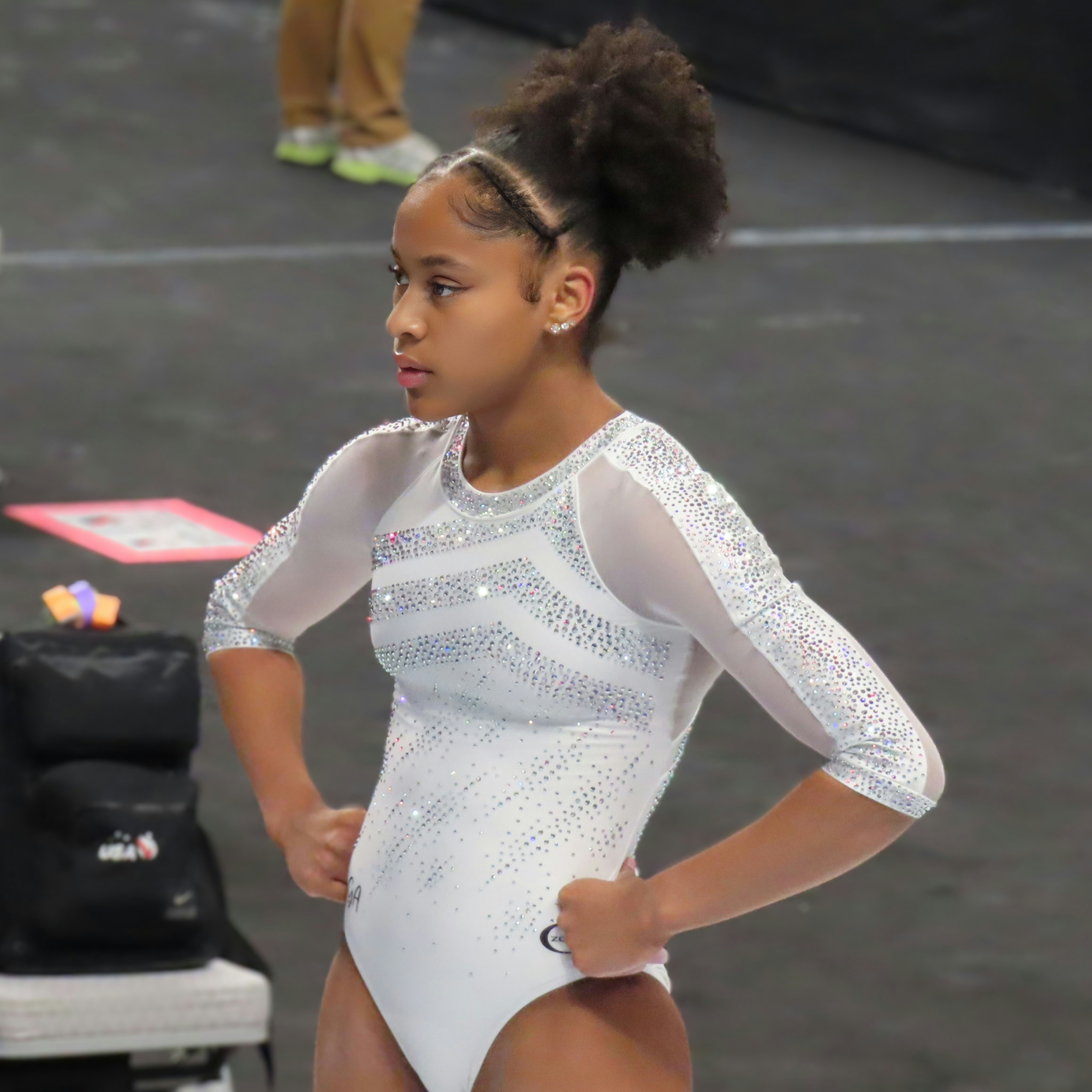
Blakely at the 2024 U.S. National Championships

=== 2024 ===
Blakely began the season competing at the 2024 Winter Cup where she was the balance beam champion and placed second in the all-around behind Kayla DiCello. She next competed at the Core Hydration Classic where she placed fifth in the all-around. At the National Championships Blakely finished second in the all-around behind Simone Biles. Additionally she finished second on vault and third on the uneven bars and balance beam. As a result she qualified to Olympic Trials. During podium training for the competition Blakely injured her right Achilles tendon and therefore withdrew from her second Olympic Trials, ending her bid for the Olympics.

=== 2025 ===
Blakely returned to elite competition at the 2025 National Championships where she only competed on uneven bars and balance beam. She co-won the uneven bars title alongside Hezly Rivera and placed second on balance beam behind Rivera. As a result she was added to the national team and invited to partake in the World Championships selection camp.

At the selection camp Blakely once again only competed on the uneven bars and balance beam. At the conclusion of the event she was selected to represent the United States at the 2025 World Championships alongside Dulcy Caylor, Joscelyn Roberson, and former Florida Gators teammate Leanne Wong. At the World Championships Blakely qualified to the uneven bars final and was the first reserve for the balance beam final. During the uneven bars final she placed fourth.

=== 2026 ===
Blakely competing at the 2026 U.S. National Championships

Blakely began the elite season competing at the U.S. Classic, where she competed on uneven bars and balance beam and won both events. She made her return to the all-around at the 2026 U.S. National Championships. On the first day of the competition, Blakely scored 55.600, tying for first place alongside Claire Pease. On the second day of competition, Blakely fell once during her floor exercise routine and fell twice on balance beam, ending the competition in seventh place. However, she was the national runner-up on the uneven bars behind Pease.

In October she was selected to compete at the 2026 World Championships alongside Pease, Charleigh Bullock, Reese Esponda, Hezly Rivera, and alternate Dulcy Caylor (later subbed in for Rivera). While there she helped the United States qualify to the team final and individually she qualified to the all-around, vault, uneven bars, and balance beam finals. During the team final she contributed scores on vault, uneven bars, and balance beam towards the United States's second place finish. During the all-around final, Blakely performed cleanly on all four apparatuses, leading her to win the title. In doing so, she became the ninth American woman to win the World all-around title. During event finals she won bronze on both vault and uneven bars and finished sixth on balance beam.

== College gymnastics career ==
In November 2022, Blakely officially signed her National Letter of Intent with the Florida Gators with the intention of deferring enrollment until after the 2024 Olympic Games.

=== 2025 ===
Blakely was named to the 2024-25 First-Year SEC Academic Honor Roll.

=== 2026 ===
After a win over No. 6 Arkansas where she shared 3 event titles, Blakely was named the SEC Specialist of the Week for the week of February 6. Blakely won the floor outright with a collegiate-best 9.975, matched her collegiate-best on beam with a 9.95 as well as on bars to share those titles as well.

After her first collegiate perfect 10 on the balance beam, Blakely was named the SEC Specialist of the Week for the week of March 3. She earned another event title with a 9.975 on bars.

Blakely was named the co-SEC Specialist Gymnast of the Year for the 2026 season alongside LSU's Kaliya Lincoln and Missouri's Hannah Horton. She was also named All-SEC by placing in the top four during the SEC Championship.

=== Regular season ranking ===
Season	All-around	Vault	Uneven bars	Balance beam	Floor exercise
2025	N/A	N/A	45th	N/A	N/A
2026	N/A	N/A	3rd	16th	18th

=== Career perfect 10.0 ===
Season	Date	Event	Meet
2026	February 27, 2026	Balance Beam	TWU/Arizona State/FIsk
2026	April 2, 2026	Uneven Bars	Baton Rouge Regional

== Competitive history ==
Competitive history of Skye Blakely at the junior level
Year	Event	Team	AA	VT	UB	BB	FX
2018	WOGA Classic		6				
2018	International Gymnix		15			5	
2018	American Classic		3rd place, bronze medalist(s)	3rd place, bronze medalist(s)	2nd place, silver medalist(s)	20	5
2018	U.S. Classic		6	3rd place, bronze medalist(s)	19	10	9
2018	U.S. National Championships		4	3rd place, bronze medalist(s)	5	8	2nd place, silver medalist(s)
2019	WOGA Classic			2nd place, silver medalist(s)		2nd place, silver medalist(s)	1st place, gold medalist(s)
2019	International Gymnix	1st place, gold medalist(s)	3rd place, bronze medalist(s)	1st place, gold medalist(s)	1st place, gold medalist(s)		
2019	Jr. World Championships Trials		1st place, gold medalist(s)				
2019	Junior World Championships	3rd place, bronze medalist(s)			4		5
2019	U.S. Classic		4	2nd place, silver medalist(s)	14	14	1st place, gold medalist(s)
2019	U.S. National Championships		4	6	8	2nd place, silver medalist(s)	3rd place, bronze medalist(s)
2020	WOGA Classic		1st place, gold medalist(s)				
2020	International Gymnix	1st place, gold medalist(s)	1st place, gold medalist(s)	2nd place, silver medalist(s)	2nd place, silver medalist(s)	2nd place, silver medalist(s)	3rd place, bronze medalist(s)

Blakely at the all-around medal ceremony for the 2026 World Championships

Competitive history of Skye Blakely at the senior level
Year	Event	Team	AA	VT	UB	BB	FX
2021	Winter Cup					1st place, gold medalist(s)	8
2021	American Classic		1st place, gold medalist(s)	4	4	2nd place, silver medalist(s)	4
2021	U.S. Classic		7		3rd place, bronze medalist(s)	18	7
2021	U.S. National Championships		7		17	8	10
2021	Olympic Trials		WD				
2022	Winter Cup		2nd place, silver medalist(s)		7	3rd place, bronze medalist(s)	2nd place, silver medalist(s)
2022	DTB Pokal Team Challenge	1st place, gold medalist(s)					
2022	Pan American Championships	2nd place, silver medalist(s)	3rd place, bronze medalist(s)		4	7	3rd place, bronze medalist(s)
2022	U.S. National Championships		6		5	9	6
2022	World Championships	1st place, gold medalist(s)				5	
2023	Winter Cup				6	1st place, gold medalist(s)	
2023	U.S. Classic			3rd place, bronze medalist(s)	2nd place, silver medalist(s)	3rd place, bronze medalist(s)	
2023	U.S. National Championships		4	2nd place, silver medalist(s)	2nd place, silver medalist(s)	2nd place, silver medalist(s)	21
2023	World Championships	1st place, gold medalist(s)					
2024	Winter Cup		2nd place, silver medalist(s)		10	1st place, gold medalist(s)	8
2024	U.S. Classic		5	2nd place, silver medalist(s)	16	6	8
2024	U.S. National Championships		2nd place, silver medalist(s)	2nd place, silver medalist(s)	3rd place, bronze medalist(s)	3rd place, bronze medalist(s)	8
2024	Olympic Trials		WD				
2025	U.S. National Championships				1st place, gold medalist(s)	2nd place, silver medalist(s)	
2025	World Championships	—N/a			4	R1	
2026	U.S. Classic				1st place, gold medalist(s)	1st place, gold medalist(s)	
2026	U.S. National Championships		7		2nd place, silver medalist(s)	12	17
2026	World Championships	2nd place, silver medalist(s)	1st place, gold medalist(s)	3rd place, bronze medalist(s)	3rd place, bronze medalist(s)	6	

Competitive history of Skye Blakely at the NCAA level
Year	Event	Team	AA	VT	UB	BB	FX
2025	SEC Championships	3rd place, bronze medalist(s)			5		
2025	NCAA Championships	7			30		
2026	SEC Championships	1st place, gold medalist(s)	4	2nd place, silver medalist(s)	2nd place, silver medalist(s)	9	17
2026	NCAA Championships	3rd place, bronze medalist(s)			2nd place, silver medalist(s)	11	37
