= Laurent Landi =

French-American gymnastics coach & gymnast (born 1977)

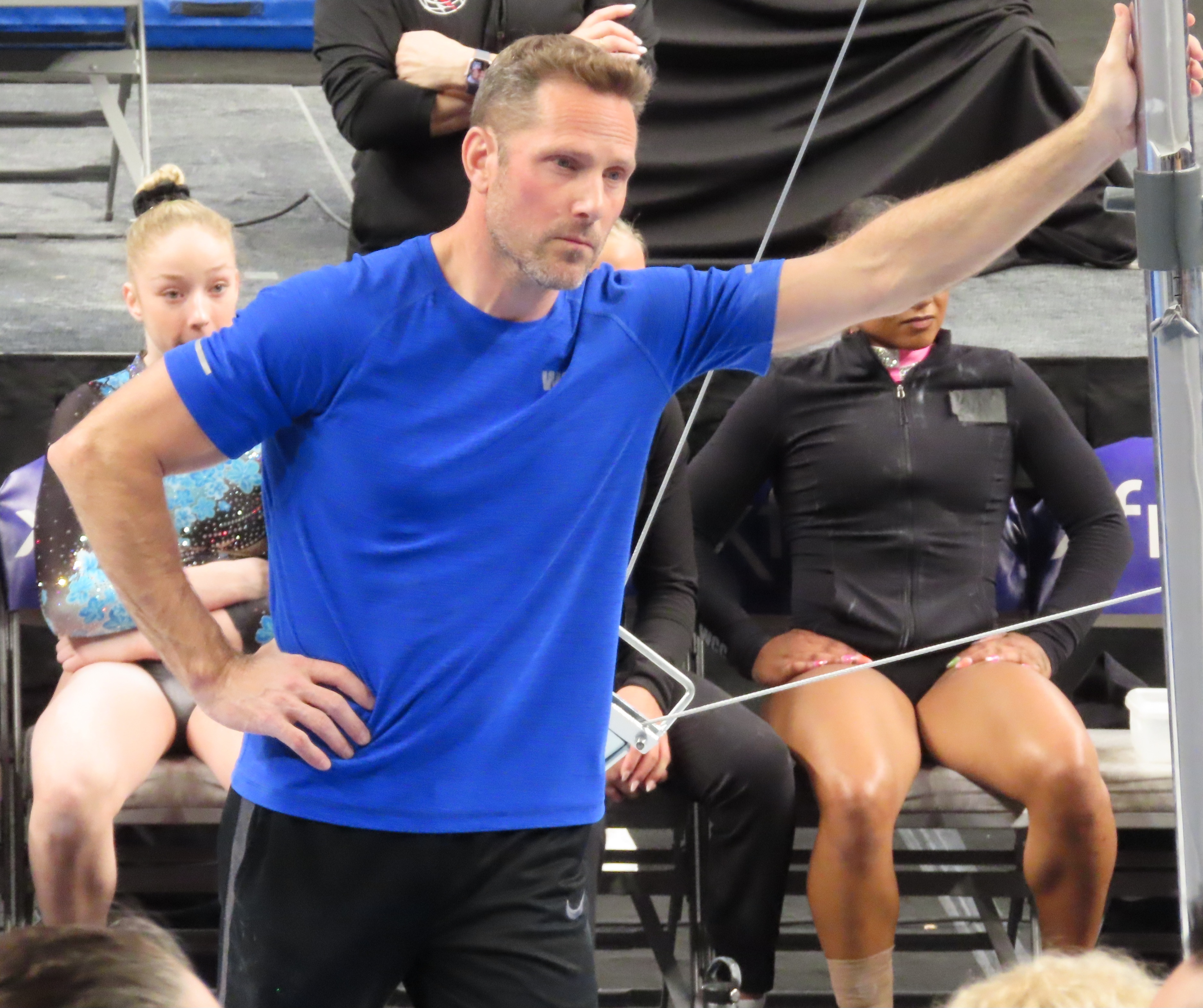
- Laurent Landi in 2024.

Personal information
- Born: 18 October 1977 (age 48) Antibes, France
- Spouse: Cécile Canqueteau-Landi (m. 2005)
- Relatives: Juliette Landi (daughter)

Gymnastics career
- Discipline: Men's artistic gymnastics
- Country represented: France
Medal record
Representing France
Junior European Championships
Bronze medal – third place	1994 Prague	Horizontal bar
- Coaching career

Current position
- Title: Associate head coach
- Team: Georgia Bulldogs
- Conference: SEC

Coaching career (HC unless noted)
- 2027–present: Georgia (Associate head coach)

Laurent Landi (born 18 October 1977) is a French artistic gymnastics coach and retired gymnast. He is currently the associate head coach for the Georgia GymDogs NCAA gymnastics team. He was formerly a coach at the World Olympic Gymnastics Academy (2007–2017) and at World Champions Centre, serving as the head coach to Simone Biles (2017–2025). Landi has previously coached world and Olympic champion Madison Kocian and world champion Alyssa Baumann.

== Gymnastics career ==
Landi was a member of the French national team in gymnastics. He trained at the Olympic Antibes Juan-les-Pins Club in Antibes, France. He placed 12th in the all-around and won the bronze medal on high bar at the 1994 Junior European Championships.

== Coaching career ==
Following his competitive career, in 1999, Landi started coaching at his club in Antibes. Landi coached there until 2002, when he began working at the French National Gymnastics training center in Marseille, France. In 2004, he moved to Norman, Oklahoma, with his future wife, Cecile. In Oklahoma, Landi was a coach at the Bart Conner Gymnastics Academy. In 2007, he and his wife began working at the World Olympic Gymnastics Academy, where they coached gymnasts such as Alyssa Baumann, Madison Kocian, Briley Casanova, Samantha Ogden, and Sophia Lee. In 2017, Landi moved from WOGA to the World Champions Centre, where he was head coach to Simone Biles through the 2020 and 2024 Olympic Games.

In May 2026, Landi was named Associate Head Coach of the Georgia Bulldogs women's gymnastics team.

== Personal life ==
Landi married Cécile Canqueteau, a gymnastics coach and 1996 Olympian, in 2005. In 2007, they welcomed their daughter, Juliette Landi, who would go on to become a competitive diver and 2024 Olympian.
