= Cécile Canqueteau-Landi =

French gymnastics coach & former artistic gymnast (born 1979)

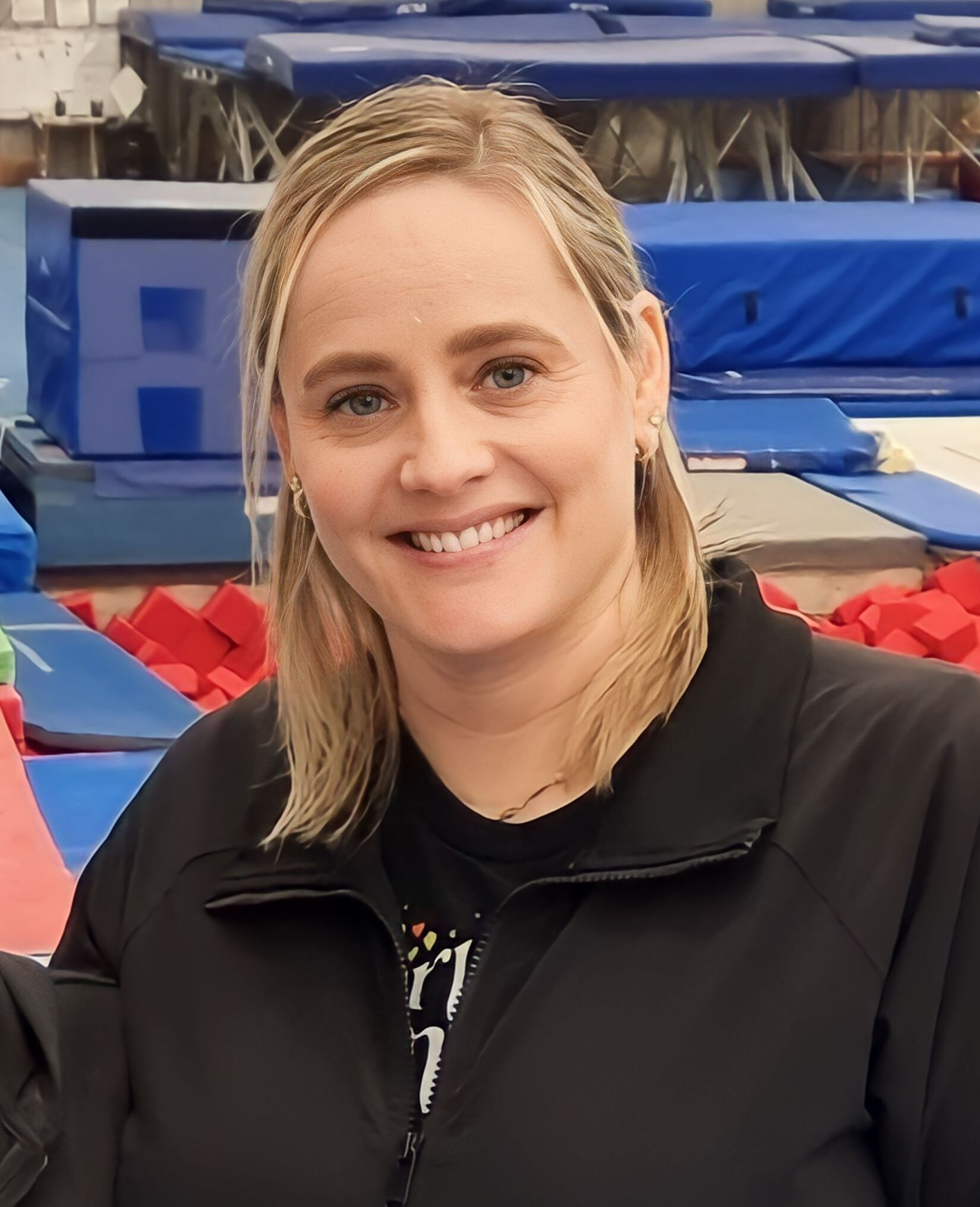
- Canqueteau-Landi in 2024
- Born: October 3, 1979 (age 47); Provence-Alpes-Côte d'Azur, France
- Education: Lycée-Collège Honoré Daumier (1995-98); University of the Mediterranean
- Occupation: Gymnastics coach
- Employers: World Champions Centre (2017–24); WOGA (2007–17)
- Known for: Coaching Simone Biles
- Spouse: Laurent Landi (m. 2005)
- Children: Juliette Landi

Cécile Canqueteau-Landi
Current position
- Title: Head coach
- Team: Georgia Bulldogs
- Conference: SEC

Biographical details
- Education: University of the Mediterranean

Coaching career (HC unless noted)
- 2024–present: Georgia

Cécile Canqueteau-Landi (born October 3, 1979) is a French gymnastics coach and former artistic gymnast. She competed at the 1996 Olympics and currently serves as head coach for the Georgia GymDogs. She coached at World Champions Centre in Spring, Texas from 2017 to 2024 where she was Simone Biles personal coach and WOGA from 2007 to 2017.

== Early years ==
Canqueteau was born on October 3, 1979, in the Provence-Alpes-Côte d'Azur region of France. In the fall of 1988, she started at École Sainte-Anne. In 1990, she resumed secondary education at C.E.S. Roy D'Espagne until 1995. Later, Canqueteau finished at the Lycée-Collège Honoré Daumier. She enrolled at Aix-Marseille University, which was then the University of the Mediterranean, but left after one year of study.

== Gymnastics career ==
Canqueteau started gymnastics at the age of five, and at nine years old she moved to Marseille to enter the national center. She trained at the Club Gymnastique Saint-Giniez, a well-known gymnastics club in the Canton of Marseille – Saint-Giniez, which has since been disbanded. Canqueteau trained at this club for the whole of her gymnastics career.

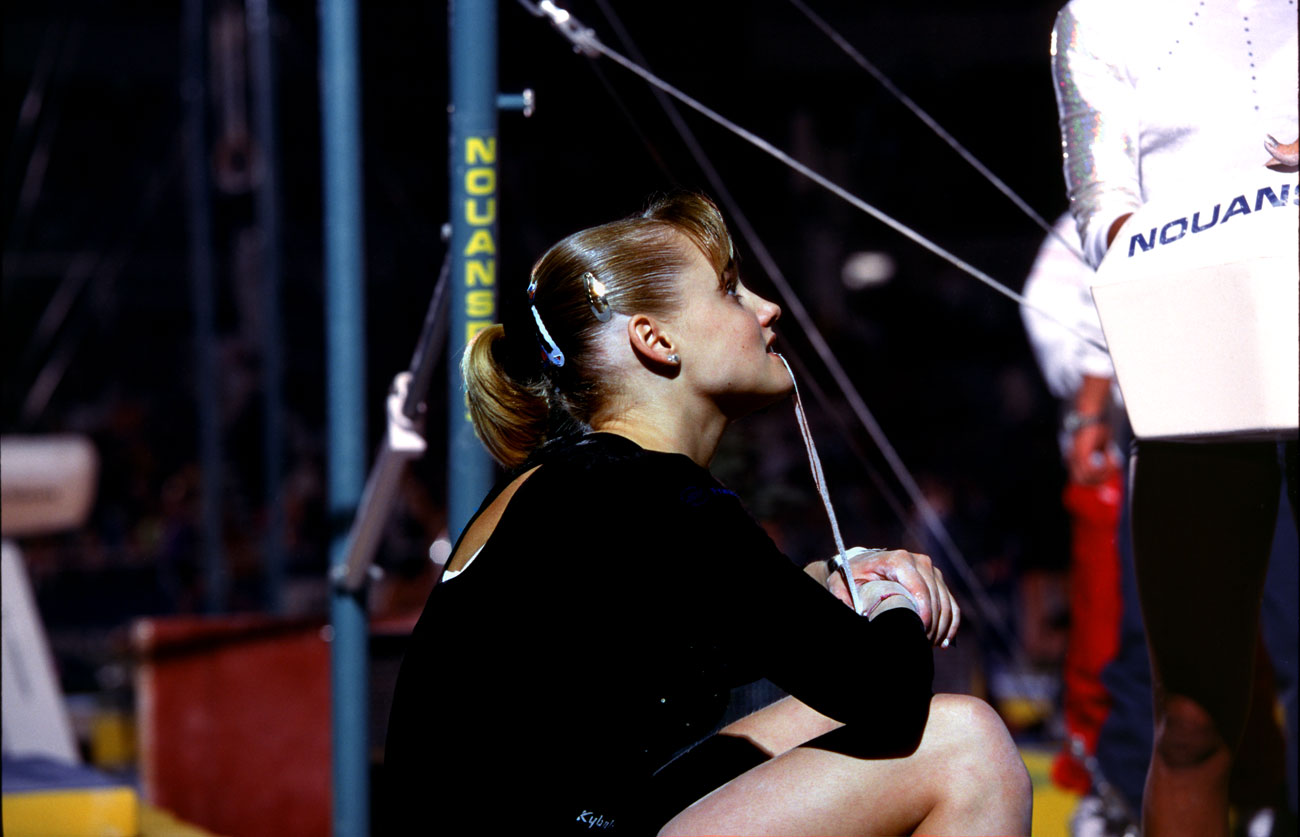
Canqueteau at the French Championships in 1998

Canqueteau's first major international competition was the 1994 World Artistic Gymnastics Championships in Dortmund, Germany. This was a team-only worlds, so there were no all-around or event finals to qualify for. However, in the 1995 World Artistic Gymnastics Championships in Sabae, Japan, she finished 39th in the all-around in the qualification round, but didn't make the all-around final due to the three-per-country rule at the time.

She was later selected for the 1996 Summer Olympics and competed in the qualification round, finishing in 8th place for France. Canqueteau won the gold medal with the French team at the 1997 Mediterranean Games. She competed at another World and European Championships in 1997–1998 and retired from Elite gymnastics in 1999. She competed for her club at nationals until 2002.

== Coaching career ==
After she left university, Canqueteau started coaching at the French National Training Center from 2001 to 2004. Following her four-year stint for the French National Team, Canqueteau moved to Norman, Oklahoma, United States, with then-boyfriend Laurent Landi in August 2004 and started coaching at Bart Conner Gymnastics Academy.

In June 2007, after under three years of coaching at the Bart Conner Gymnastics Academy, both she and husband, Laurent, moved to Texas to coach at the renowned World Olympic Gymnastics Academy. At WOGA, Canqueteau-Landi served as the personal coach to Alyssa Baumann, Briley Casanova, Sophia Lee, and Samantha Ogden, and has also worked extensively with Katelyn Ohashi, Madison Kocian and various other WOGA alumni. Many of her athletes have been full-ride scholarship recipients, state, regional, and national champions.

In October 2017, Canqueteau-Landi joined the coaching staff at World Champions Centre, where she and husband Laurent Landi are personal coaches to Simone Biles, and where she is assistant head coach of the girls' competitive program.

In April 2024, she was named co-head coach of the University of Georgia's gymnastics team, alongside fellow co-head coach Ryan Roberts.

== Personal life ==
Canqueteau married boyfriend and ex-French National Team member, Laurent Landi, on August 20, 2005, at A Little White Wedding Chapel in Las Vegas, Nevada. Ludivine Furnon and Ivan Ivankov were both in attendance at the ceremony.

The couple have a daughter, Juliette, born in 2007, who competed at the 2024 Olympics for the French national diving team. She committed to Auburn University to compete in the NCAA.
