= Juliette Landi =

French-American diver (born 2007)

Personal information
- Full name: Juliette Elvire Landi
- Nationality: American/French
- Born: 3 April 2007 (age 19) Norman, Oklahoma, U.S.

Sport
- Country: France
- Sport: Diving
- Events: 1 m springboard 3 m springboard 3 m springboard syncro
- Club: Red Star de Montreuil; Woodlands Diving Club
Medal record
Women's diving
Representing France
European Championships
Bronze medal – third place	2024 Belgrade	3 m synchro

Juliette Elvire Landi (born 3 April 2007) is a French-American diver. She represented France at the 2024 Olympic Games in Paris.

== Biography ==
Landi is the daughter of former French gymnasts Cécile Canqueteau-Landi and Laurent Landi. She was born in Oklahoma, where her parents were coaching gymnastics. Her mother competed at the 1996 Olympic Games in Atlanta, finishing eighth with the French women's team.

Landi was a competitive gymnast for several years, but eventually lost interest. She took up diving during the COVID pandemic.

Landi trains at the Woodlands Diving Club in Houston, Texas, USA, and is a member of Red Star de Montreuil, near Paris. She has committed to compete on the diving team at Auburn University.

She competed at the 2024 Summer Olympics where she came 8th in the 3 metre springboard event alongside Naïs Gillet.
