= Simone Biles =

American artistic gymnast (born 1997)

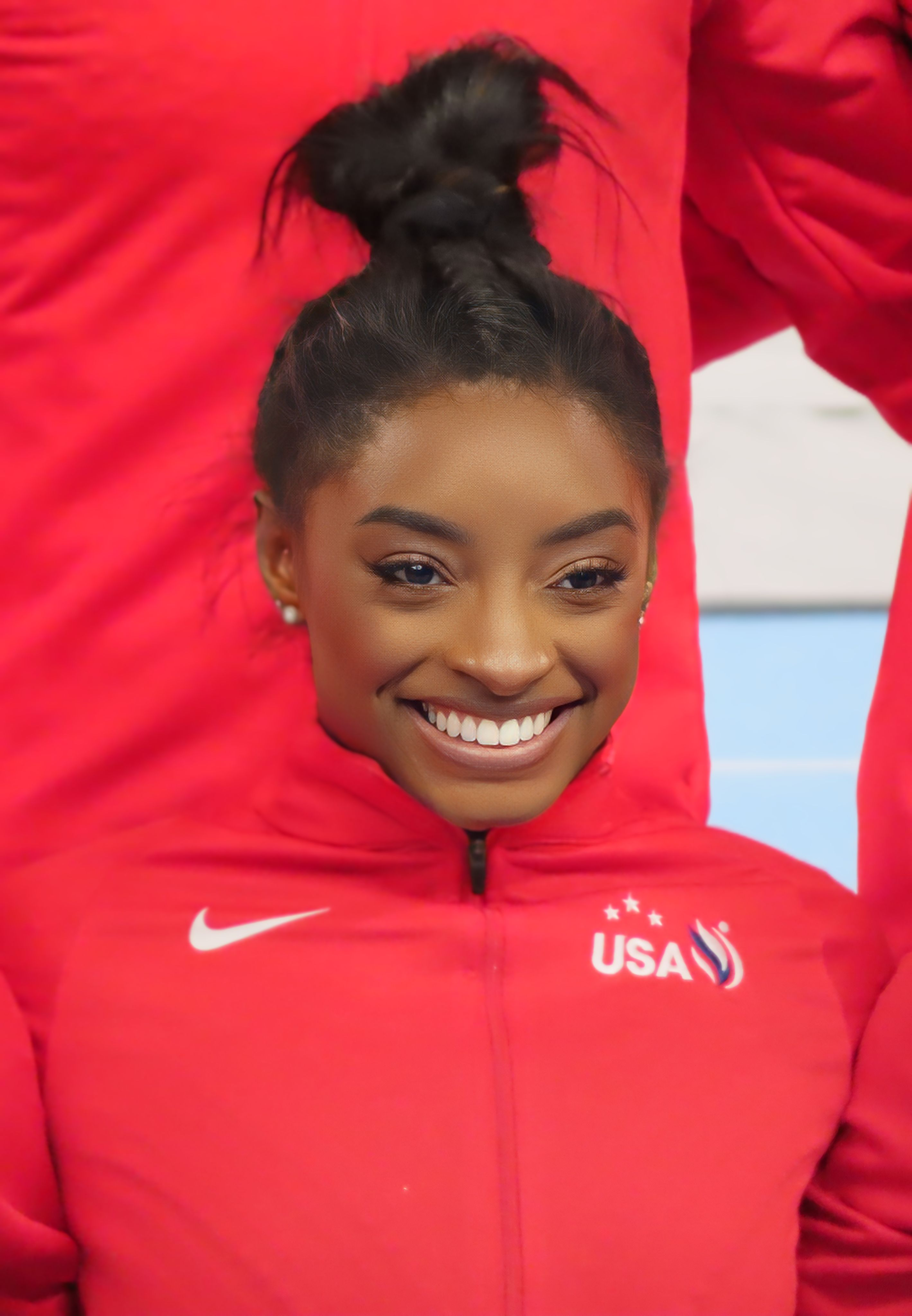
- Biles at the 2024 U.S. Championships

Personal information
- Full name: Simone Arianne Biles Owens
- Born: March 14, 1997 (age 29) Columbus, Ohio, U.S.
- Height: 4 ft 8 in (142 cm)
- Spouse: Jonathan Owens (m. 2023)

Gymnastics career
- Discipline: Women's artistic gymnastics
- Country represented: United States; (2012–2016, 2018–2021, 2023–2024)
- Gym: World Champions Centre (2015–present); Bannon's Gymnastix Inc. (2003–2014)
- Head coaches: Laurent Landi; Cécile Canqueteau-Landi
- Former coach: Aimee Boorman
- Eponymous skills: Biles (6.0) (vault): Yurchenko half on–straight front salto double twist off Biles II (6.4) (vault): Yurchenko double pike Biles (H) (balance beam): double-twisting double tucked salto dismount Biles (G) (floor exercise): double layout salto half out Biles II (J) (floor exercise): triple-twisting double tucked salto (aka "triple double")
Medal record
Representing United States
Women's artistic gymnastics
Event	1st	2nd	3rd
Olympic Games	7	2	2
World Championships	23	4	3
Pacific Rim Championships	2	0	0
Total	32	6	5
Olympic Games
Gold medal – first place	2016 Rio de Janeiro	Team
Gold medal – first place	2016 Rio de Janeiro	All-around
Gold medal – first place	2016 Rio de Janeiro	Vault
Gold medal – first place	2016 Rio de Janeiro	Floor exercise
Gold medal – first place	2024 Paris	Team
Gold medal – first place	2024 Paris	All-around
Gold medal – first place	2024 Paris	Vault
Silver medal – second place	2020 Tokyo	Team
Silver medal – second place	2024 Paris	Floor exercise
Bronze medal – third place	2016 Rio de Janeiro	Balance beam
Bronze medal – third place	2020 Tokyo	Balance beam
World Championships
Gold medal – first place	2013 Antwerp	All-around
Gold medal – first place	2013 Antwerp	Floor exercise
Gold medal – first place	2014 Nanning	Team
Gold medal – first place	2014 Nanning	All-around
Gold medal – first place	2014 Nanning	Balance beam
Gold medal – first place	2014 Nanning	Floor exercise
Gold medal – first place	2015 Glasgow	Team
Gold medal – first place	2015 Glasgow	All-around
Gold medal – first place	2015 Glasgow	Balance beam
Gold medal – first place	2015 Glasgow	Floor exercise
Gold medal – first place	2018 Doha	Team
Gold medal – first place	2018 Doha	All-around
Gold medal – first place	2018 Doha	Vault
Gold medal – first place	2018 Doha	Floor exercise
Gold medal – first place	2019 Stuttgart	Team
Gold medal – first place	2019 Stuttgart	All-around
Gold medal – first place	2019 Stuttgart	Vault
Gold medal – first place	2019 Stuttgart	Balance beam
Gold medal – first place	2019 Stuttgart	Floor exercise
Gold medal – first place	2023 Antwerp	Team
Gold medal – first place	2023 Antwerp	All-around
Gold medal – first place	2023 Antwerp	Balance beam
Gold medal – first place	2023 Antwerp	Floor exercise
Silver medal – second place	2013 Antwerp	Vault
Silver medal – second place	2014 Nanning	Vault
Silver medal – second place	2018 Doha	Uneven bars
Silver medal – second place	2023 Antwerp	Vault
Bronze medal – third place	2013 Antwerp	Balance beam
Bronze medal – third place	2015 Glasgow	Vault
Bronze medal – third place	2018 Doha	Balance beam
Pacific Rim Championships
Gold medal – first place	2016 Everett	Team
Gold medal – first place	2016 Everett	All-around
FIG World Cup
Event	1st	2nd	3rd
All-Around World Cup	2	1	0

Simone Arianne Biles Owens (née Biles; born March 14, 1997) is an American artistic gymnast. Her 11 Olympic medals and 30 World Championship medals make her the most decorated gymnast in history. She is widely regarded as one of the greatest gymnasts of all time, and one of the greatest female athletes in history. With 11 Olympic medals, she is tied with Věra Čáslavská as the second-most decorated female Olympic gymnast behind Larisa Latynina, and has the most Olympic medals earned by a U.S. gymnast.

At the Olympic Games, Biles is a two-time gold medalist in the individual all-around (2016, 2024). She is also a two-time champion on vault (2016, 2024), the 2016 champion and 2024 silver medalist on floor exercise, and a two-time bronze medalist on balance beam (2016, 2020). Biles led the gold medal-winning U.S. teams in 2016, dubbed the "Final Five", and in 2024, dubbed the "Golden Girls". At the 2020 Summer Olympics, where she was favored to win at least four of the six available gold medals, she withdrew from most of the competition after the qualification round due to "the twisties", a temporary loss of proprioception while performing twisting elements. She won a silver medal with the U.S. team nicknamed the "Fighting Four".

Biles is the most-decorated gymnast of the World Championships, with 30 medals, all but seven gold. She is a six-time all-around champion (2013, 2014, 2015, 2018, 2019 and 2023), six-time floor exercise champion (2013–2015, 2018–2019, 2023), and four-time balance beam champion (2014–2015, 2019, 2023), all record totals. She is also a two-time vault champion (2018–2019) and a member of a record five gold-medal-winning U.S. teams (2014–2015, 2018–2019, 2023). She is also a four-time silver medalist (2013–2014 and 2023 on vault, 2018 on uneven bars) and a three-time bronze medalist (2015 on vault, 2013 and 2018 on balance beam).

Domestically, Biles has won a record nine U.S. national all-around championships (2013–2016, 2018–2019, 2021, 2023–2024); in 2024, she became the oldest female gymnast to win the title. She is a seven-time champion on vault, balance beam, and floor exercise; a two-time uneven bars champion; and the only woman to win all five gold medals in a single championships twice (2018, 2024).

Biles is the sixth woman to win an individual all-around title at both the Olympics and the World Championships; she is the first since Lilia Podkopayeva in 1996 to hold both titles simultaneously. She is the tenth woman and first American woman to win a World medal on every event, and the first woman since Daniela Silivaș in 1988 to win a medal on every event at a single Olympics or World Championships. Biles is the originator of the most difficult skill on women's vault, balance beam, and floor exercise; so far, she is the only gymnast to attempt them.

In 2022, President Joe Biden awarded her the Presidential Medal of Freedom. In 2023, she won her eighth U.S. Gymnastics title, breaking the 90-year-old record held by Alfred Jochim. Biles has won the Laureus World Sportswoman of the Year four times (2017, 2019, 2020, 2025) and Comeback of the Year once (2024).

== Early life and education ==
Biles was born on March 14, 1997, in Columbus, Ohio, the third of four siblings. Her birth mother, Shanon Biles, was unable to care for Simone or her other children. All four went in and out of foster care.

In 2000, Biles's maternal grandfather, Ron Biles, and his second wife, Nellie Cayetano Biles, began caring temporarily for Shanon's children in the north Houston suburb of Spring, Texas, after learning his grandchildren were in foster care. In 2003, the couple formally adopted Simone and her younger sister Adria. Ron's sister, Shanon's aunt Harriet, adopted the two oldest children. Simone holds Belizean citizenship through her adoptive mother and considers Belize to be her second home. Biles and her family are Catholic.

Biles attended Benfer Elementary School in Harris County, Texas. In 2012, Biles switched from public school to home schooling, allowing her to increase her training from about 20 to 32 hours a week. She earned her high-school diploma in mid-2015. Biles verbally committed to UCLA on August 4, 2014, and signed a National Letter of Intent in November 2014, planning to defer enrollment until after the 2016 Summer Olympics in Rio de Janeiro. Instead, on July 29, 2015, she announced that she would turn professional and forfeit her NCAA eligibility to compete for UCLA.

== Early gymnastics career ==
Biles first tried gymnastics at age 6 during a day-care field trip. The instructors suggested she continue with the sport, and Biles soon enrolled in an optional training program at Bannon's Gymnastics. She began training with coach Aimee Boorman at age eight.

=== 2011–12: Junior elite ===
Biles began her elite gymnastics career at age 14 on July 1, 2011, at the 2011 American Classic in Houston. She placed third all-around, first on vault and balance beam, fourth on floor exercise, and eighth on uneven bars. Later that month, Biles competed at the 2011 U.S. Classic in Chicago, Illinois, where she placed 20th all-around, fifth on vault and floor exercise.

Biles's first meet of 2012 was the American Classic hosted in Huntsville, Texas. She placed first all-around and on vault, tied for second on floor exercise, placed third on balance beam, and fourth on uneven bars.

Biles's placement in the American Classic secured her a spot to compete at the 2012 USA Gymnastics National Championships. She later competed at the 2012 U.S. Classic in Chicago. She finished first all-around and on vault, second on floor exercise, and sixth on balance beam. In June, she made her second appearance at the U.S. National Championships in St. Louis, Missouri. She finished third all-around, first on vault, and sixth on uneven bars, balance beam, and floor exercise. After this performance, Biles was named to the U.S. Junior National Team by a committee headed by Márta Károlyi, the National Team Coordinator (2001–2016).

== Senior gymnastics career ==
=== 2013 ===
Biles's senior international debut was in March at the 2013 American Cup, a FIG World Cup event. She and Katelyn Ohashi were named as replacements for Elizabeth Price and 2012 Olympic gold medalist Kyla Ross, both of whom withdrew from the competition because of injuries. Biles led for two rotations but finished second behind her teammate, Ohashi, after a fall off the beam.

Biles traveled to Jesolo, Italy, to compete at the 2013 City of Jesolo Trophy. She took the all-around, vault, balance beam, and floor exercise titles in addition to contributing to the U.S. team's gold medal. She and the U.S. delegation next competed at an international tri-meet in Chemnitz, Germany, against teams from Germany and Romania. The U.S. won the team gold medal. In addition, Biles won the vault, balance beam, and floor titles, and tied for second in the all-around, behind Kyla Ross, after a fall on the uneven bars.

In July, Biles competed at the 2013 U.S. Classic. She performed poorly, falling several times, and did not compete vault after twisting her ankle on the floor exercise. In the aftermath of this poor performance, Biles consulted a sports psychologist whom she credits with helping her anxiety and confidence issues and allowing her to begin her streak of dominance in the sport.

Biles competed at the 2013 U.S. National Gymnastics Championships in August, where she was crowned the national all-around champion. Biles also won silver in all four individual events. After the USA Gymnastics National Championships, Biles was named to the Senior National Team and was invited to the qualifying camp for the 2013 World Artistic Gymnastics Championships in Texas. She was selected for the World Championships team.

In October, Biles competed at the 2013 World Championships in Antwerp, Belgium. She qualified first in the all-around, second to the vault final, sixth to the uneven bars final, fifth to the balance beam final, and first to the floor final, making her the first American gymnast to qualify to the all-around and all four event finals since Shannon Miller in 1991. Biles competed cleanly during the women's individual all-around and won the competition with a score of 60.216, almost a point ahead of silver medalist Ross, and almost a point and a half better than the bronze medalist, 2010 world all-around champion Aliya Mustafina. Biles subsequently had surgery for bone spurs in her right tibia, sidelining her for three weeks.

At the age of 16, Biles became the seventh American woman and the first African American to win the world all-around title. In the event finals, she won silver on the vault, behind defending world champion and Olympic silver medalist McKayla Maroney and ahead of 2008 Olympic gold medalist Hong Un Jong of North Korea; bronze on the balance beam, behind Mustafina and Ross; and gold on the floor exercise, ahead of Italy's Vanessa Ferrari and Romania's Larisa Iordache. She finished fourth in the uneven bars final, behind China's Huang Huidan, Ross, and Mustafina.

=== 2014 ===
Biles missed the start of the season due to injury, sitting out the 2014 AT&T American Cup and the 2014 Pacific Rim Championships. Her debut that year was at the U.S. Classic in Chicago. She won the all-around by a wide margin and also took first place on vault, beam (tied with Ross), and floor. At the 2014 USA Gymnastics National Championships, Biles repeated as national all-around champion after two days of competition, finishing more than four points ahead of silver medalist Ross, despite a fall from the balance beam during her final routine of the meet. She won the gold on vault and floor, tied for the silver on balance beam with Alyssa Baumann, and finished fourth on the uneven bars. She was once again selected for the Senior National Team.

On September 17, Biles was selected to compete at the 2014 World Artistic Gymnastics Championships in Nanning, China. She dominated the preliminary round despite a major error on the uneven bars, qualifying in first place to the all-around, vault, beam, and floor finals, in addition to contributing to the U.S. team's first-place qualification into the team final. During the team final, Biles led the United States to its second consecutive world team championship, which they won over the second-place Chinese team by nearly seven points. In the all-around, Biles performed cleanly on all four events, bettering her bars score from qualifications by more than a point, and won her second consecutive world all-around title ahead of Ross and Romanian Larisa Iordache. Biles became the second American woman to repeat as world all-around champion, following Miller (1993 and 1994), and the first woman of any nationality to do so since Russia's Svetlana Khorkina (2001 and 2003). Biles finished behind North Korea's Hong Un Jong in the vault competition, taking her second consecutive silver medal in that event. She won the gold in the balance beam final ahead of China's Bai Yawen and the gold in the floor exercise final, again, ahead of Iordache. This brought her total of World Championship gold medals to six, the most ever by an American gymnast, surpassing Miller's five.

=== 2015 ===
Biles competed at the 2015 AT&T American Cup at AT&T Stadium in Arlington, Texas, on March 7. She placed first with a score of 62.299, 4.467 points ahead of second-place finisher U.S. teammate MyKayla Skinner. Later that month, Biles was nominated for the James E. Sullivan Award. She ended the month at the 2015 City of Jesolo Trophy, winning the all-around title with 62.100.

On July 25, she competed at the U.S. Classic and finished first in the all-around, ahead of 2012 Olympic all-around champion Gabby Douglas and Maggie Nichols, with a score of 62.400. On the beam, she scored 15.250 and took first at the event, ahead of Douglas and 2012 Olympic beam bronze medalist Aly Raisman. She scored 16.050 on the floor and claimed first in the event, 1.050 points ahead of Douglas and also ahead of Nichols and Bailie Key. She had a small hop on her Amanar vault and scored 16.000. She then scored 15.150 on her second vault, to score an average of 15.575 and place first in the event, ahead of 2014 Worlds vault bronze medalist and teammate MyKayla Skinner, who averaged 14.950. Biles ended on bars and scored a 15.100 to claim the all-around title. She placed fourth in the event behind 2014 Worlds teammate Madison Kocian, Douglas, and Key.

At the 2015 U.S. National Championships, Biles secured her third all-around national title, becoming only the second woman ever to do so, 23 years after Kim Zmeskal (1990, 1991, 1992).

Biles, along with Douglas, Dowell, Kocian, Nichols, Raisman, and Skinner, was selected to represent the United States at the 2015 World Artistic Gymnastics Championships in Glasgow, Scotland. Biles once again qualified in first place in the all-around, vault, beam, and floor finals. Her uneven bars score would have qualified her in eighth place in that final as well, but she was excluded, as per the rules, after teammates Kocian and Douglas qualified ahead of her. In team finals, she helped the United States team win their third consecutive gold medal at a World Championships event. During the all-around final, Biles performed below her usual standard, taking a large hop on the vault, landing out of bounds on floor (which she stated was a first), and grasping the beam to prevent a fall. However, her final score of 60.399 was more than enough to secure the title with her largest margin of victory yet (over a point ahead of silver medalist Gabby Douglas and bronze medalist Larisa Iordache). With that victory, Biles became the first woman to win three consecutive all-around titles in World Gymnastics Championships history. During day one of event finals, Biles competed on vault, taking bronze behind Maria Paseka (RUS) and Hong Un Jong (PRK). On day two, she competed on the balance beam and floor exercise, retaining her world title in both events by large margins. This brought Biles's total World Championships medal count to 14, the most for any American, and total gold medal count to 10, the most for any woman in World Championships history.

=== 2016 ===
In April, Biles began her season at the Pacific Rim Championships, where she won the all-around title and had the highest score on vault (where she debuted a more difficult second vault), floor exercise (where she debuted a new floor routine), and balance beam. Additionally, the U.S. won the team title by a wide margin. Biles did not compete in the event finals. On June 4, Biles competed at the Secret U.S. Classic in two events only, the uneven bars and beam. She placed first on balance beam with a 15.650 and placed fifth on uneven bars with a 15.1.

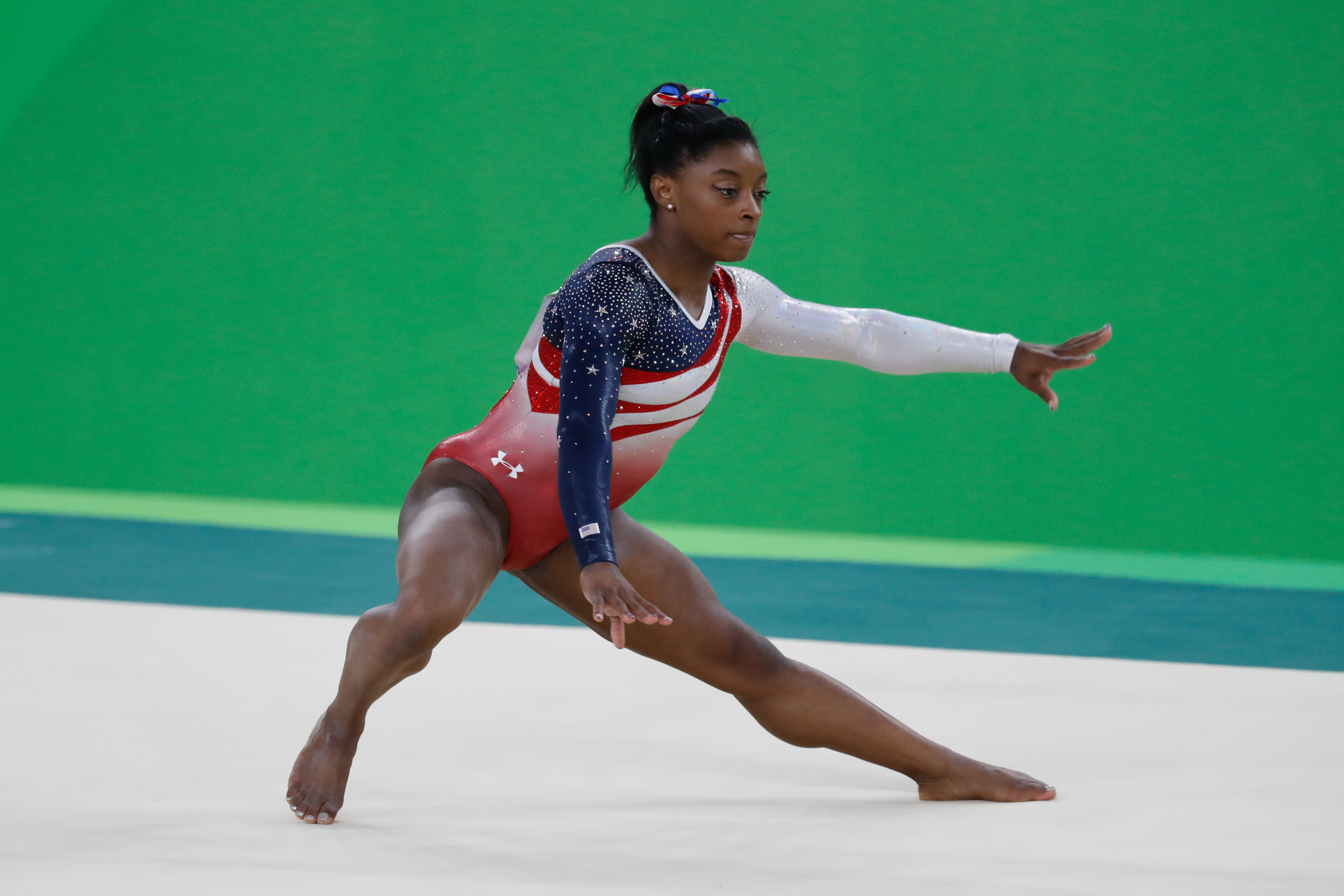
Biles competing at the 2016 Summer Olympics

In the following weeks at the 2016 U.S. National Championships, Biles won the all-around title by a wide margin of 3.9 points over Aly Raisman. She won the gold medal on vault and floor exercise, receiving scores of at least 16 all four times. She also won the gold medal on the balance beam and placed fourth on uneven bars.

On July 10, Biles was named to the team for the 2016 Rio Summer Olympics, alongside Gabby Douglas, Laurie Hernandez, Madison Kocian, and Aly Raisman.

In September 2016, Biles's medical information was released, and she was accused of doping to enhance performance by the Russian media following the Russian cyber espionage group Fancy Bear's hack into the World Anti-Doping Agency. Biles then disclosed on Twitter that she has attention deficit hyperactivity disorder and was permitted to take medication for it, having applied for and received a therapeutic use exemption. She was applauded for opening up about ADHD.

==== 2016 Summer Olympics ====
In the runup to the 2016 Rio Games, Biles appeared in a Tide commercial ("The Evolution of Power") with gymnasts Dominique Dawes and Nadia Comăneci.

Biles competing in the 2016 Summer Olympics

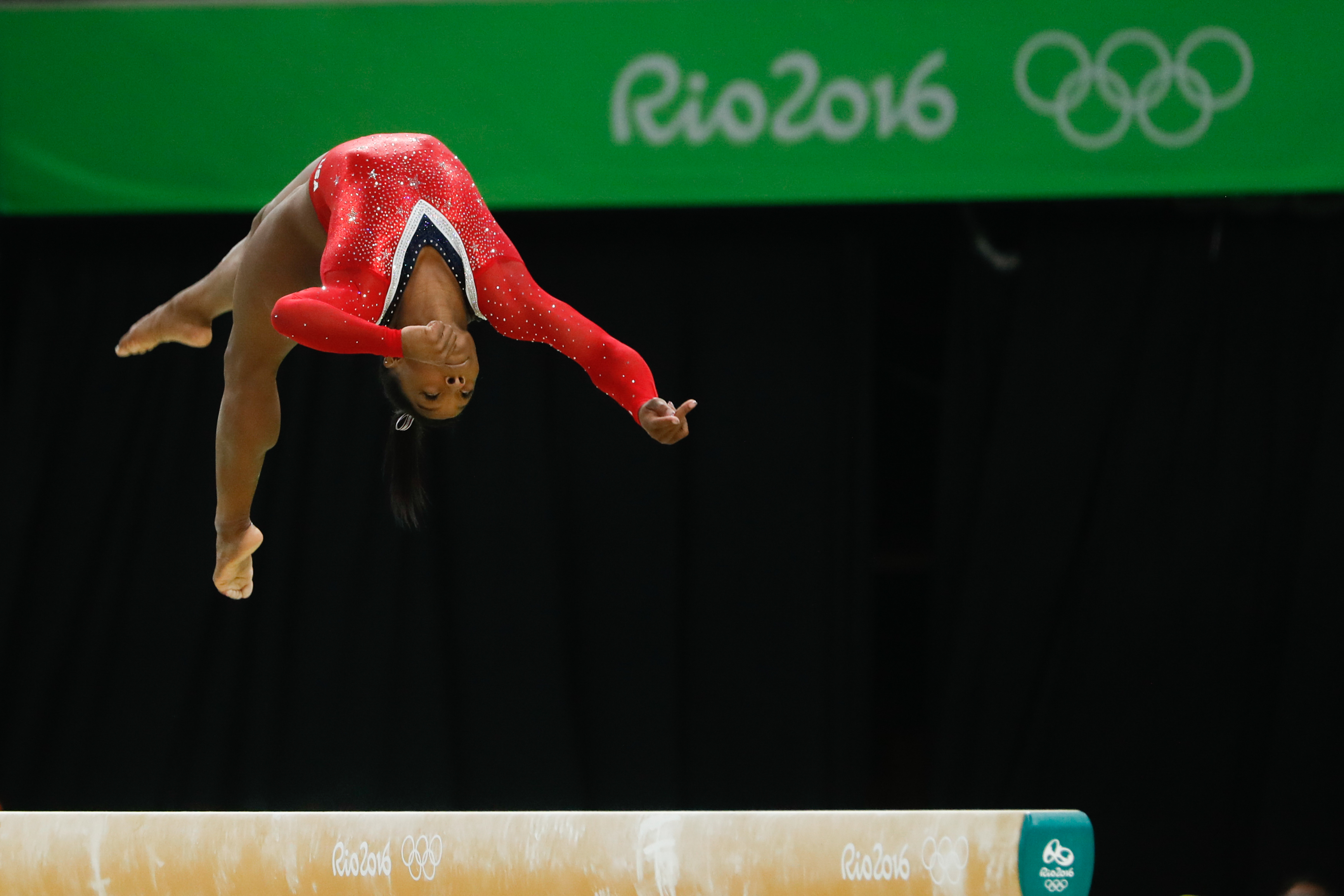
Balance Beam

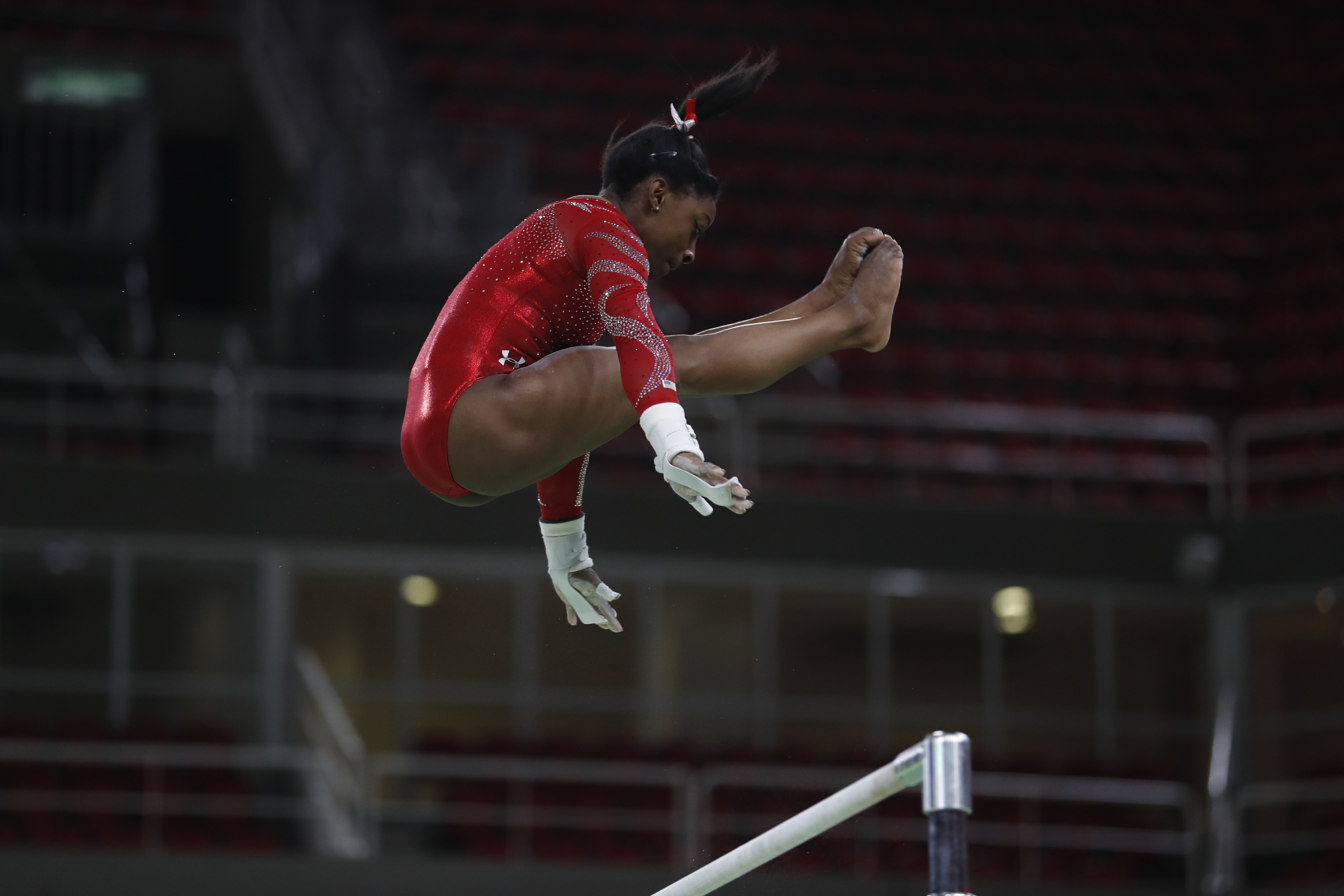
Uneven Bars

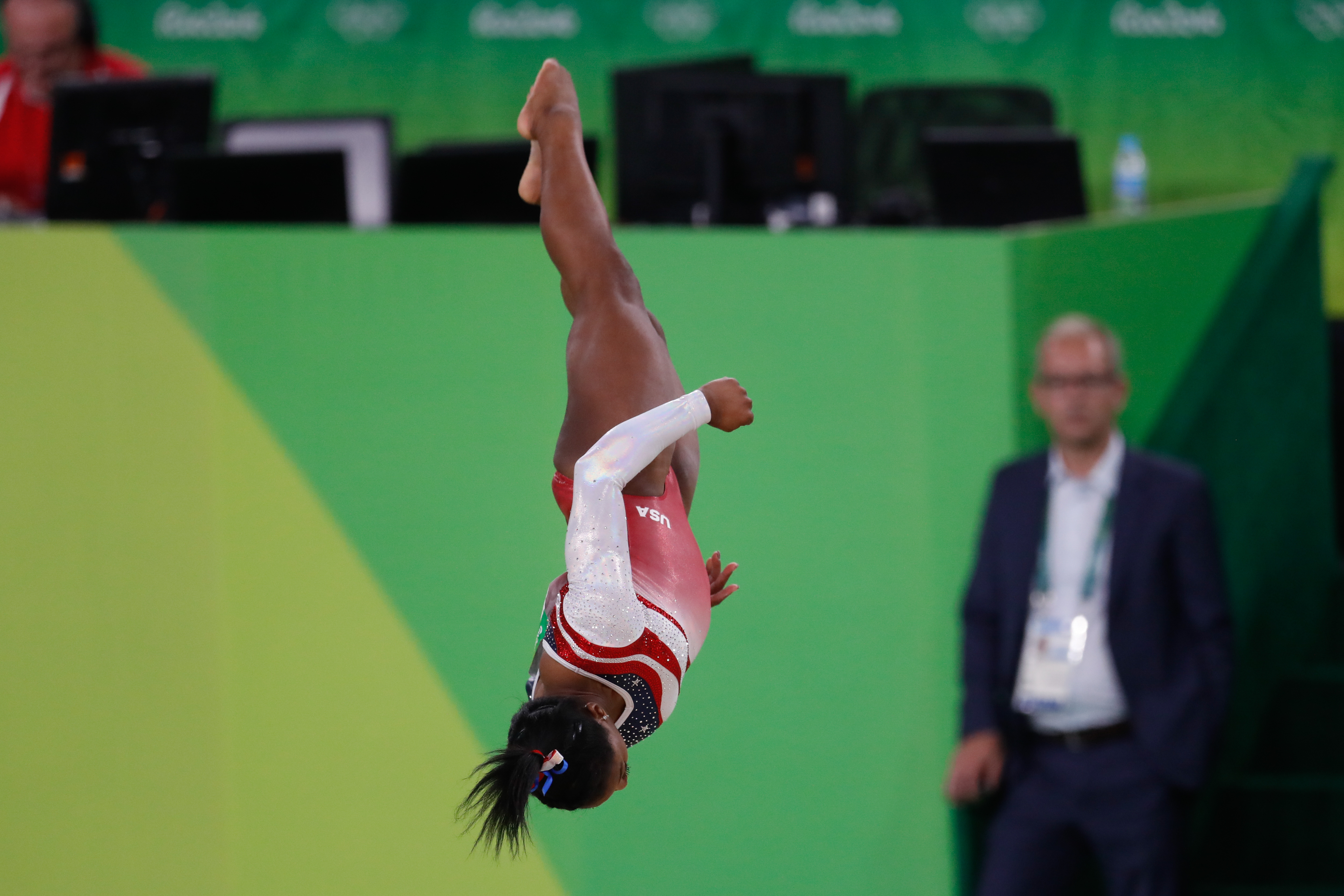
Floor Exercise

On August 7, Biles competed in the Women's Qualification at the 2016 Summer Olympics, helping the U.S. team to qualify in first place to the final with a score of 185.238 (9.959 points ahead of the second-place team, China). She also qualified as the top gymnast in four of the five individual finals: the all-around with a score of 62.416, vault with an average score of 16.050, balance beam with a score of 15.633, and floor exercise with a score of 15.733.

On August 9, Biles won her first Olympic gold medal in the gymnastics team event. The only gymnast for Team USA to compete in all four events in the final, she contributed an all-around score of 61.833 (15.933 on vault, 14.800 on bars, 15.300 on beam, and 15.800 on floor) as the Americans won the gold with a score of 184.897, more than 8 points ahead of the silver-medal Russian team.

Biles won the gold medal in the individual all-around on August 11, ahead of teammate Aly Raisman and Russia's Aliya Mustafina. Biles earned a total score of 62.198 with 15.866 on the vault, 14.966 on the uneven bars, 15.433 on the balance beam, and 15.933 on the floor. Biles had the highest scores on vault, balance beam, and floor; she had the only score over 15 on balance beam in the finals. She and Raisman became the second pair of American gymnasts to win gold and silver in the individual all-around, after Nastia Liukin and Shawn Johnson in 2008.

In the vault final, she scored 15.900 for her Amânar and 16.033 for her Cheng to win her second individual gold medal with an average score of 15.966, more than 0.7 points ahead of second-place finisher Maria Paseka of Russia and third-place finisher Giulia Steingruber of Switzerland.

In the balance beam final, she grabbed the beam with her hands (a mandatory 0.5-point deduction) after underrotating her front tuck and scored 14.733. Despite her mistake, she won the bronze behind teammate Laurie Hernandez, who won the silver with a score of 15.333, and Sanne Wevers of the Netherlands, who won the gold with a score of 15.466).

In the floor exercise final, she won the gold with a score of 15.966. Teammate Aly Raisman won the silver with a score of 15.500 and Amy Tinkler of Great Britain won bronze scoring 14.933. With Biles's five total medals along with Madison Kocian's silver medal on the uneven bars, Team USA claimed a medal in every women's artistic gymnastics event for the first time since 1984.

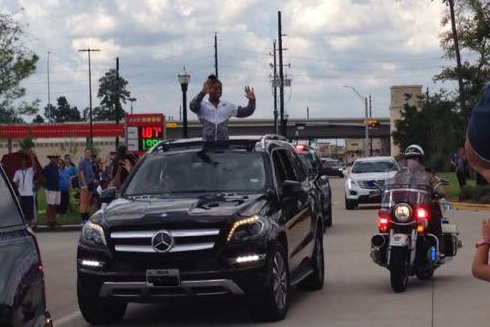
A homecoming parade for Biles in Spring, Texas, on August 24, 2016

With four Olympic gold medals, Biles set an American record for most gold medals in women's gymnastics at a single Games, and equaled several other records with her medals won in Rio. Biles winning four gold medals was the first instance of a quadruple gold medallist in women's gymnastics at a single Games since Ecaterina Szabo (Romania) in 1984, and fifth overall, after Larisa Latynina (USSR, 1956), Agnes Keleti (Hungary, 1956), Věra Čáslavská (Czechoslovakia, 1968) and Szabo. Biles became the sixth female gymnast to have won an individual all-around title at both the World Championships and the Olympics—the others being Larisa Latynina, Věra Čáslavská, Ludmilla Tourischeva, Elena Shushunova, and Lilia Podkopayeva. Biles is the first female gymnast since Lilia Podkopayeva (Ukraine) in 1996 to win gold in the all-around as well as in an event final, and the first female gymnast since Podkopayeva to win the Olympic all-around title while holding the World and European/American individual all-around titles. She joined Latynina (1956–1960), Čáslavská (1964–1968), and Ludmilla Tourischeva (1968–1972), as the fourth female gymnast to win every major all-around title in an Olympic cycle.

Biles joined Mary Lou Retton in 1984, Shannon Miller in 1992, and Nastia Liukin in 2008, in winning five women's gymnastics medals at a single Olympics, along with Szabo (Roumania, 1984), Nadia Comaneci (Roumania, 1976), and Karin Janz (East Germany, 1972). Olga Mostepanova (USSR) also won five gold medals at the Alternate Olympics in 1984. The overall record for most women's Olympic gymnastics medals at a single game (majority gold), remains six medals (Latynina, 1956, 1960, and 1964, Keleti, 1956, Čáslavská, 1968, Daniela Silivas, 1988).

Biles and her teammate Gabby Douglas are the only American female gymnasts to win both the individual all-around gold and team gold at the same Olympics. Douglas won both at the 2012 London Games.

Biles was chosen by Team USA to be the flag bearer in the closing ceremonies, becoming the first American female gymnast to receive this honor.

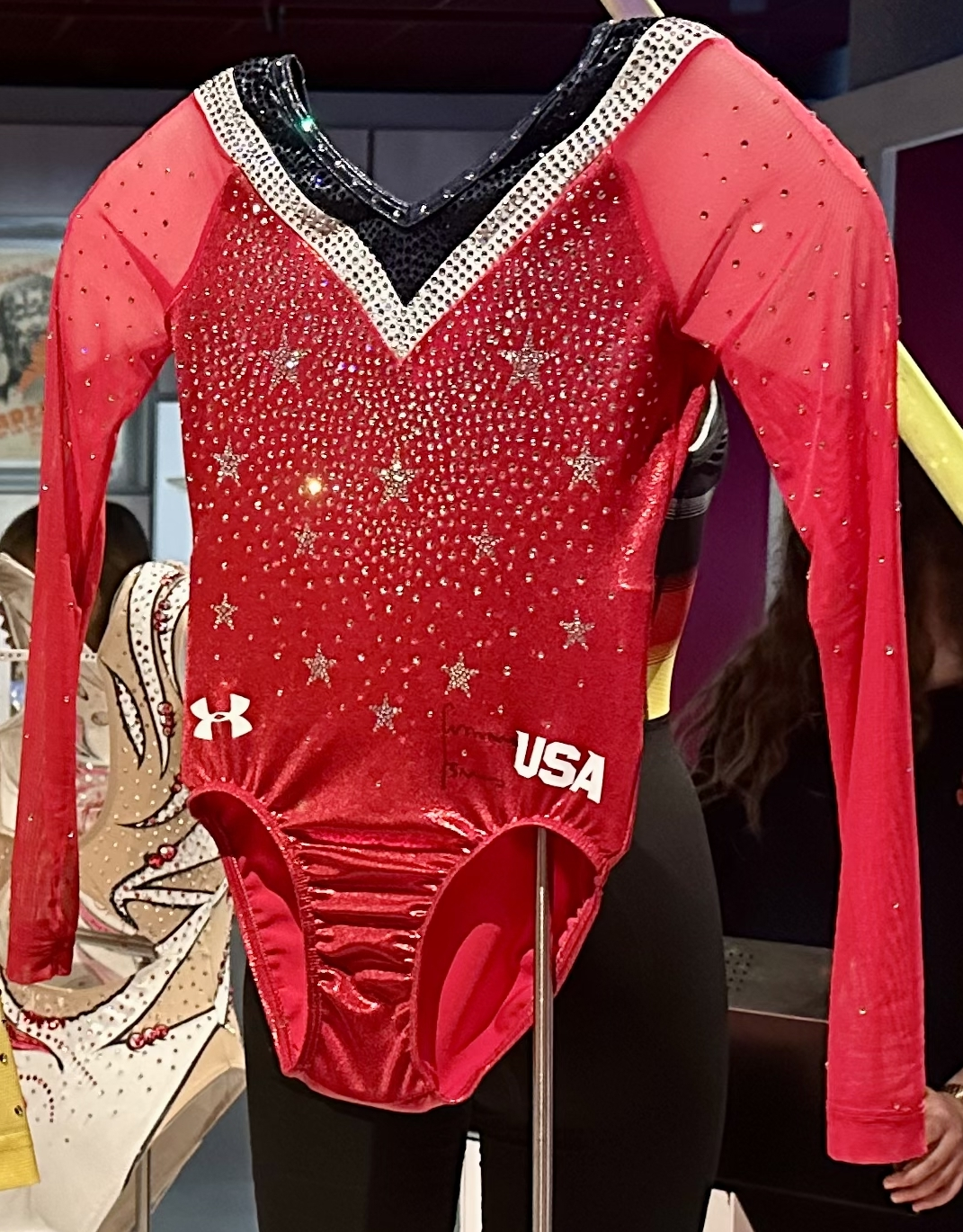
Leotard used by Simone Biles at the Rio 2016 Olympic Games on display at the Olympic Museum in Lausanne

=== 2017: Hiatus ===
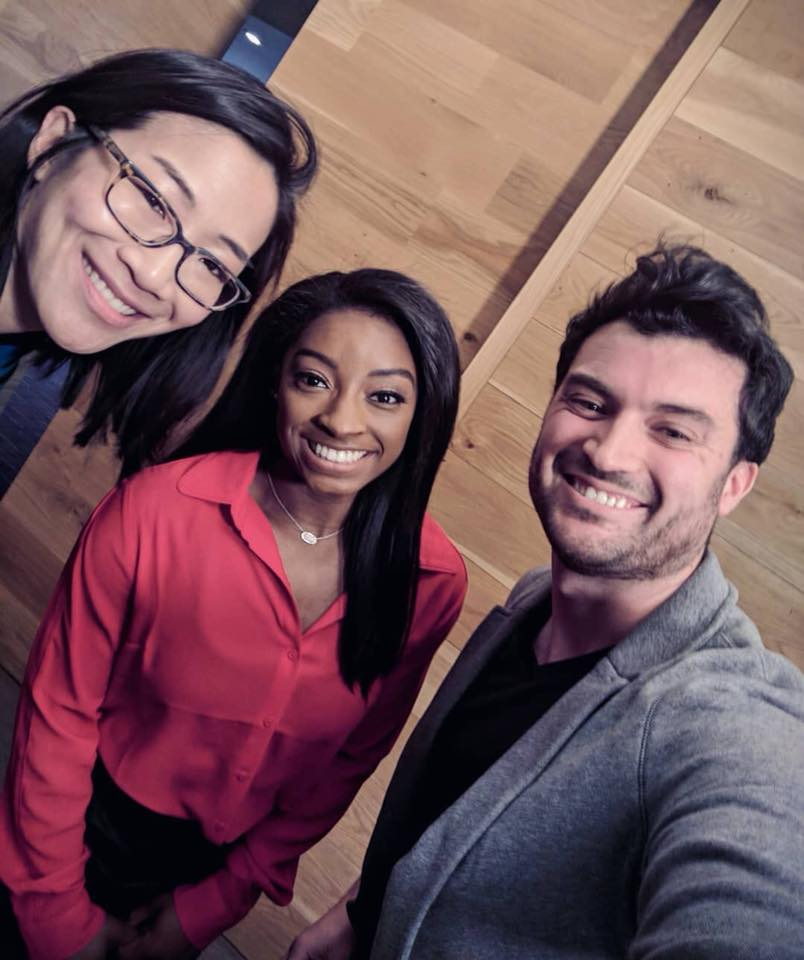
Biles with VOA's Ramon Taylor in 2018

Biles did not compete in 2017.

After the 2016 Rio Games, Biles co-wrote an autobiography with journalist Michelle Burford, Courage to Soar: A Body in Motion, A Life in Balance, which reads: "I want people to reach for their dreams and there are so many people who have inspired me with their love and encouragement along the way and I want to pass on that inspiration to readers." The book reached number one on The New York Times best sellers Young Adult list the week of January 8, 2017 and was turned into a Lifetime biopic.

Biles competed on season 24 of Dancing with the Stars, attempting to replicate her Rio teammate Laurie Hernandez's win in season 23. Paired with professional dancer Sasha Farber, she was favored to win but was eliminated on May 15, 2017, one week before the finals, finishing in fourth place.

In August, during the 2017 P&G National Championships, Biles said that she had returned to the gym to start conditioning. Her longtime coach, Aimee Boorman, had moved to Florida with her family; in October Biles hired coach Laurent Landi, who had coached her Olympic teammate Madison Kocian.

=== 2018: Return to competition ===
Biles was added back to the National Team on March 1 after the Athlete Selection Committee viewed recent videos of her performances. Her first competition of the year was the U.S. Classic in July, where she won the all-around title ahead of Riley McCusker by 1.200 points. She also won the gold medal on floor and balance beam and recorded the highest single vault score. Her all-around score of 58.700 became the highest score recorded under the 2017–2020 Code of Points despite a fall on the uneven bars and an out-of-bounds penalty on floor exercise. She showed numerous upgrades to her routines from 2016, including a Fabrichnova (double-twisting double back dismount) and a Van Leeuwen on uneven bars, and a Moors (double-twisting double layout) on floor exercise.

In August, Biles competed at the 2018 National Championships. She placed first in every event over the two days of competition, the first woman to do so since Dominique Dawes in 1994. Biles won the all-around title 6.55 points ahead of second-place finisher and reigning world champion Morgan Hurd and set a record for the most national all-around titles with five. This placement also marked her fourth national vault title, third national balance beam and floor exercise titles, and first national uneven bars title. Her 60.100 all-around score from the first day of competition was the first score recorded above 60 since her own all-around victory at the 2016 Olympics. She was named to her seventh national team and was invited to the October selection camp for the 2018 World Championships.

At the 2018 Youth Olympics, the mixed multi-discipline teams were named for gymnastics legends, including Biles, Nadia Comăneci, and Kōhei Uchimura. The team named for Biles won gold.

In October, Biles participated in the World Team Selection Camp. She placed first in the all-around as well as first in vault and floor exercise. She placed second on the uneven bars behind McCusker, and fourth on the balance beam (due to hands touching the mat on dismount) behind Kara Eaker, McCusker, and Ragan Smith. Biles debuted a new vault: a Yurchenko with a half turn onto the table with a stretched salto forward off with two full twists (Cheng with an extra half twist). The following day she was named to the team to compete at the 2018 World Championships alongside McCusker, Hurd, Grace McCallum, Eaker, and alternate Ragan Smith.

==== 2018 World Championships ====
In late October, at the 2018 World Championships in Doha, Qatar, Biles went to an emergency room the night before the qualifying round because of stomach pains that turned out to be a kidney stone. After confirming that it was not appendicitis, she checked herself out of the hospital. The next day, she qualified to the all-around, vault, balance beam and floor exercise finals in first place, and to the uneven bars final in second place behind Nina Derwael of Belgium. After successfully performing the vault she premiered at the selection camp, it was named the Biles in the Code of Points, and given a difficulty value of 6.4 (for the 2017–2020 Code of Points), which was tied with the Produnova for the most difficult women's vault ever competed. The US also qualified for the team final in first place. During the team final, Biles competed on all four events, recording the highest score of any competitor on vault, uneven bars, and floor exercise. The U.S. team won the gold medal with a score of 171.629, 8.766 points ahead of second-place Russia, beating previous margin of victory records set in the open-ended code of points era at the 2014 World Championships (6.693) and 2016 Rio Olympics (8.209).

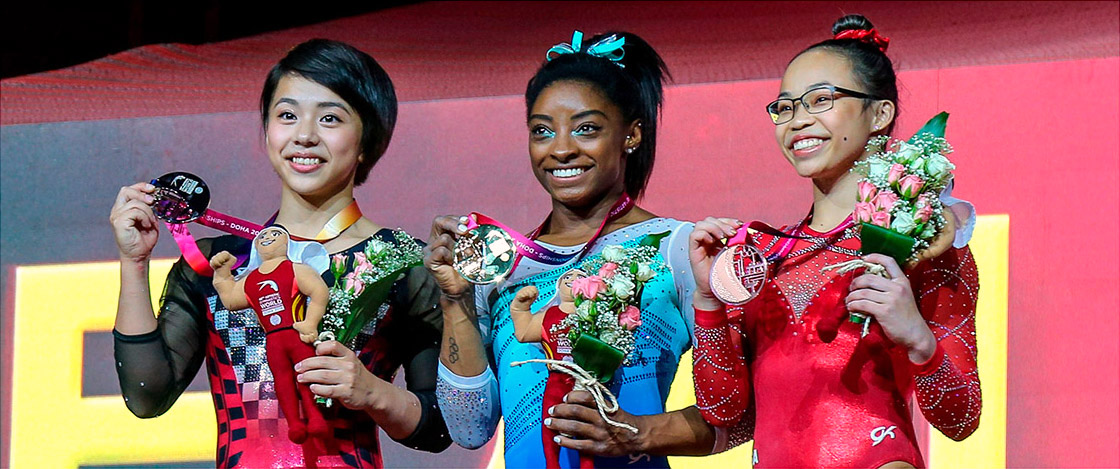
Biles alongside all-around silver medalist Murakami and bronze medalist Hurd at the 2018 World Championships

In the all-around final, Biles won the gold medal by a margin of 1.7 points despite falling on both the vault and the balance beam. The overwhelming difficulty gap between her and her competitors allowed her to claim the title with a score of 57.491 over silver medalist Mai Murakami of Japan and bronze medalist Morgan Hurd. Earning her fourth world all-around title, Biles set a new record for most women's World All-Around titles, surpassing the previous record of three held by Svetlana Khorkina. She also became the first defending Olympic women's all-around champion to earn a world all-around title since 1972 Olympic champion Lyudmilla Turischeva did so in 1974.

In the event finals, Biles won the gold medal in vault, her first-ever world vault title. The two vaults she competed in were a Cheng and an Amanar. This marked her thirteenth World gold medal, meaning Biles had won the most Gymnastics World Championships titles of any gender, breaking Soviet/Belarusian gymnast Vitaly Scherbo's previous record of twelve gold medals. She then won the silver medal on uneven bars behind Nina Derwael of Belgium. By winning a medal on uneven bars, Biles became the first American and the tenth female gymnast from any country to have won a World Championship medal on every event. The following day, she won the bronze medal on balance beam behind Liu Tingting of China and Ana Padurariu of Canada after a large balance check on her Barani. She then won the gold medal in floor exercise with a strong routine. In doing so, she became the first U.S. gymnast and first non-Soviet gymnast to win a medal on every event at a single World Championships, as well as the first gymnast from any country to do so since Elena Shushunova in 1987. Her 6 medals at this World Championships brought her total number of world medals to 20, which tied her with Khorkina for most world medals won.

==== Larry Nassar assault ====
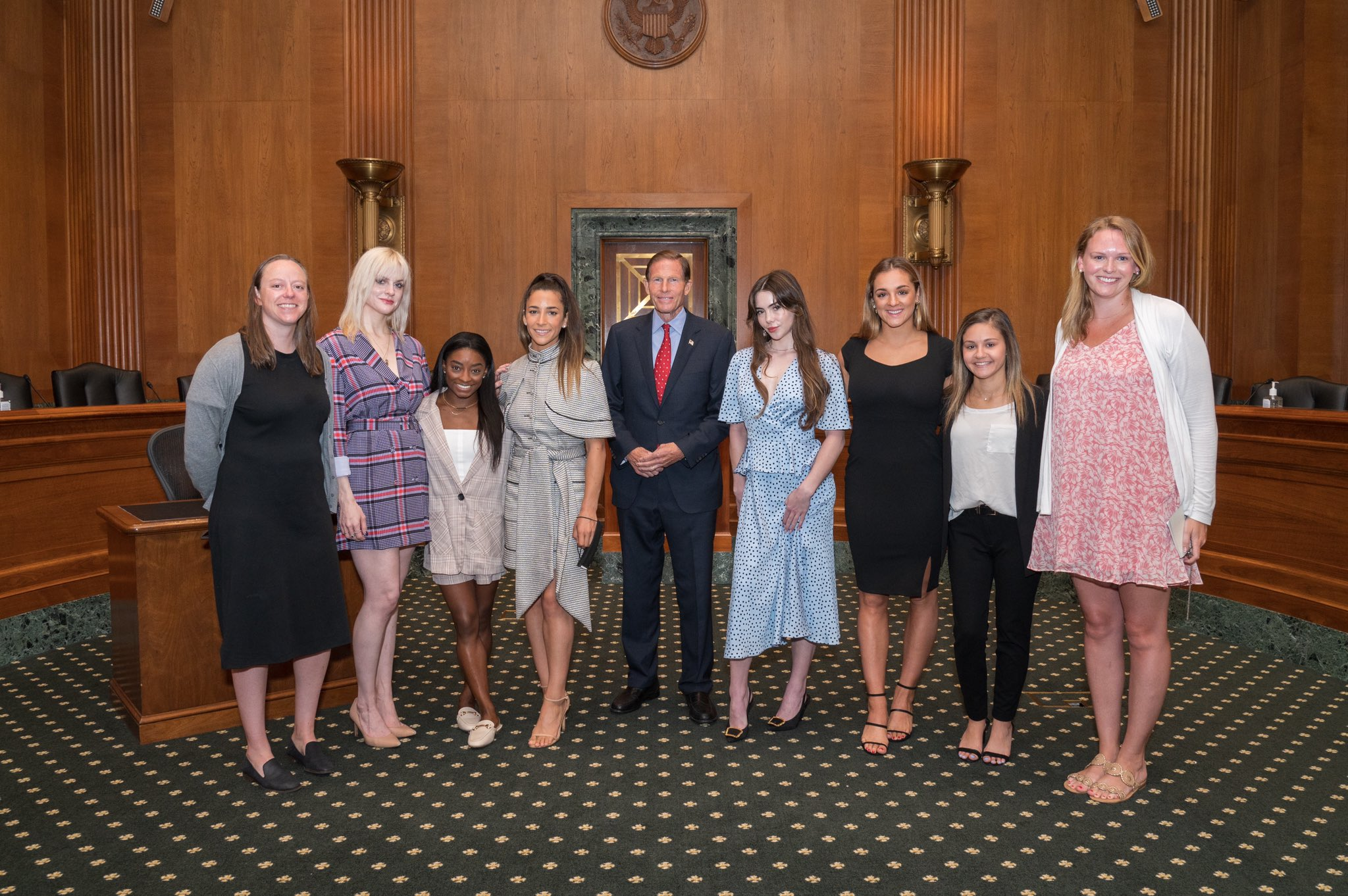
Biles with other survivors and Richard Blumenthal

On January 18, 2018, Biles said that former USA Gymnastics physician Larry Nassar had sexually assaulted her and that USA Gymnastics helped cover it up. She did not attend Nassar's sentencing hearings from January 16 to 24, 2018, saying that she "wasn't emotionally ready to face Larry Nassar again". Biles and the other survivors were awarded the Arthur Ashe Courage Award in 2018. At the 2018 U.S. National Championships, Biles wore a teal leotard that she had designed to honor the survivors of Nassar's abuse, as a statement of unity. On September 15, 2021, Biles testified to the U.S. Senate Judiciary Committee that she blamed "the entire system" for enabling and perpetuating Nassar's crimes, saying that USA Gymnastics and the United States Olympic and Paralympic Committee "failed to do their jobs". Three of her national-team teammates, McKayla Maroney, Maggie Nichols, and Aly Raisman, testified with her.

=== 2019 ===
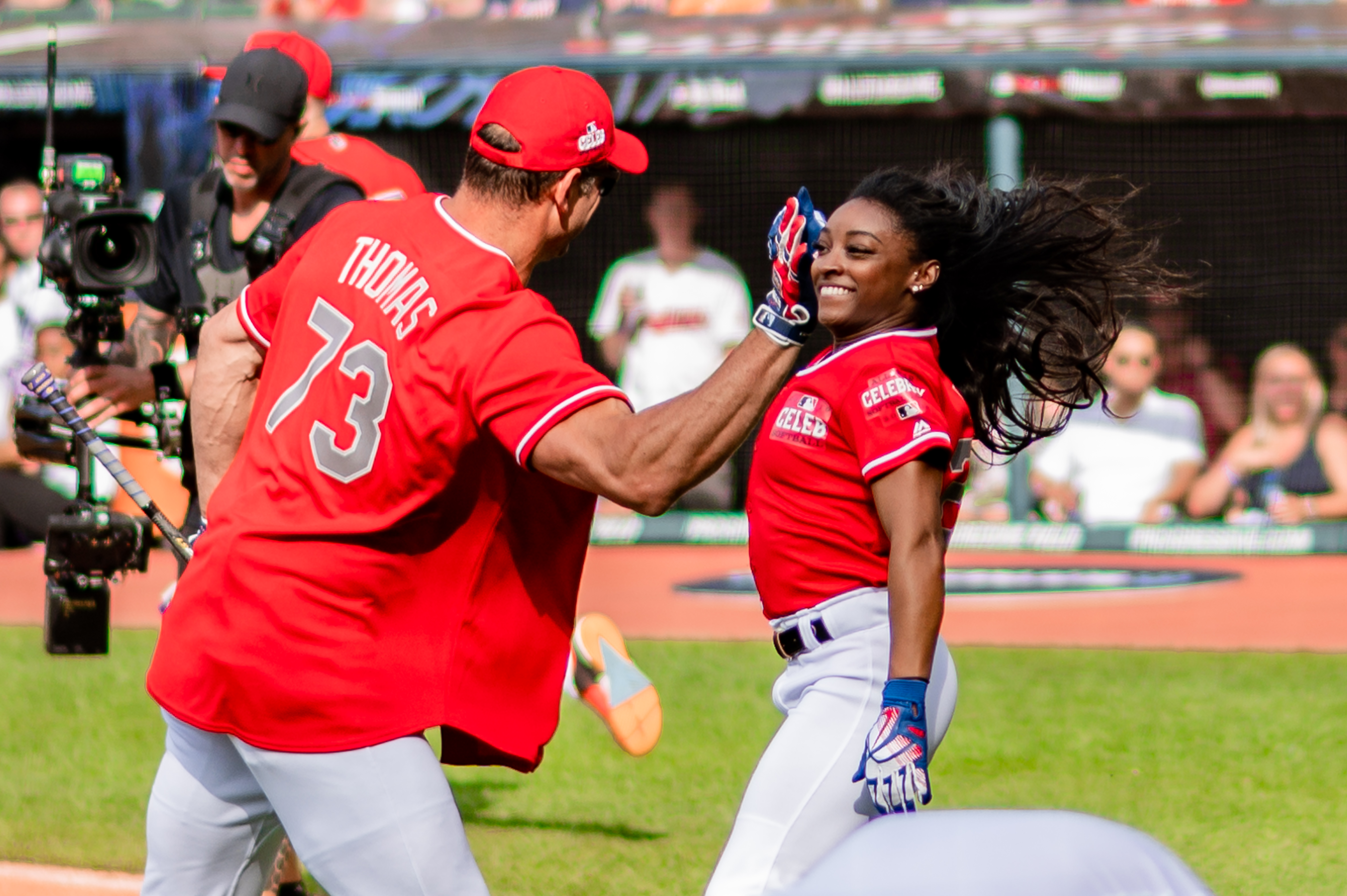
Biles and Joe Thomas at the 2019 All-Star Legends & Celebrity Softball Game

In early March, Biles competed at the Stuttgart World Cup, her first World Cup appearance not on American soil. She finished in first place, 3.668 points ahead of second-place Ana Padurariu of Canada.

In July, Biles competed at the 2019 GK US Classic. During podium training, she performed a triple-twisting double-tucked salto backwards (upgraded from a Silivas), but did not perform it during the competition. Biles won the all-around, 2.1 points ahead of second-place finisher Riley McCusker. Individually, she placed fifth on bars behind Morgan Hurd, Sunisa Lee, Grace McCallum and McCusker, third on beam behind Kara Eaker and McCusker, and first on floor exercise. She also had the highest single vault score, ahead of Jade Carey and MyKayla Skinner.

In August, Biles competed at the 2019 U.S. National Gymnastics Championships. She placed first in the all-around, with a two-day combined score of 118.500. In the competition, she became the first woman to complete a triple twisting double somersault on floor exercise and the first gymnast to complete a double twisting double somersault dismount off the balance beam. She placed first on vault, ahead of Jade Carey and MyKayla Skinner, first on balance beam ahead of Kara Eaker and Leanne Wong, first on floor exercise ahead of Carey and Sunisa Lee, and third on uneven bars behind Lee and Morgan Hurd.

In September, Biles competed at the US World Championships trials where she placed first in the all-around, despite falling on her dismount off the uneven bars, and earned a place on the team that would compete at the 2019 World Championships in Stuttgart. The following day her teammates Sunisa Lee, Kara Eaker, MyKayla Skinner, Jade Carey, and Grace McCallum were also named to the team.

==== 2019 World Championships ====
During qualifications at the World Championships, Biles helped the USA qualify for the team final in first place, over five points ahead of second-place China. Individually, she qualified for the all-around, balance beam, and floor exercise finals in first place, the vault final in second place by a margin of one one-thousandth below teammate Jade Carey, and the uneven bars final in seventh place. She debuted two new eponymous skills: the Biles II on floor exercise, a triple-twisting double-tucked somersault, and the Biles on balance beam, a double-twisting double-tucked somersault dismount. Both elements were given the highest difficulty rating of J (1.0) for all elements on their respective apparatus, and the Biles II is the only element in artistic gymnastics to receive the J rating across all disciplines for both men and women.

In the team final, Biles led Team USA to its fifth consecutive team title, contributing scores of 15.400, 14.600, 14.433, and 15.333 on vault, uneven bars, balance beam, and floor exercise, respectively. In doing so, Biles surpassed Russian gymnast Svetlana Khorkina as the most-decorated female gymnast in World Championship history. Her scores on vault, balance beam, and floor exercise were the highest of the day. During the all-around final Biles won gold with a score of 58.999, a record-setting 2.1 points ahead of second-place finisher Tang Xijing of China. Once again, she recorded the highest scores of the day on vault, balance beam, and floor exercise.

During the first day of event finals, Biles won the gold on vault, ahead of teammate Carey and Ellie Downie of Great Britain. After earning a medal on vault, her 23rd World Championships medal, Biles tied the record for most medals won at the World Championships with male Belarusian gymnast Vitaly Scherbo. During the uneven bars final, Biles earned a score of 14.700, ranking fifth, one-tenth behind bronze medalist and teammate Sunisa Lee.

On the second day of event finals, Biles scored 15.066 on the balance beam, earning the gold medal over reigning World balance beam Champion Liu Tingting and Li Shijia, both of China, by over 0.6 points. This marked Biles's 24th World Championships medal, surpassing Scherbo's record and making Biles the sole record holder for most World Championship medals won by a gymnast, whether male or female. Before the final, Biles credited her improved confidence on beam in the past year to her coach Cecile Canqueteau-Landi, who helped rework her routine following shaky performances in the event finals at the 2016 Summer Olympics and the 2018 World Championships. Biles and Landi removed inconsistent skills including the Barani, front pike, and front tuck saltos, replacing them with skills such as an aerial cartwheel (which Biles had not performed since 2014) and introducing the upgraded Biles dismount.

On floor exercise, Biles won gold with a score of 15.133, one point more than the silver medalist Lee. By winning five gold medals in Stuttgart, Biles tied the record of most gold medals won at a single World Championships with Larisa Latynina and Boris Shakhlin, who both accomplished this at the 1958 World Championships. Furthermore, by winning her fifth gold medal on floor exercise, Biles tied the record for most world titles on one apparatus with Italian Jury Chechi (who won five gold medals on still rings) and Russian Svetlana Khorkina (who won five gold medals on uneven bars).

=== 2020 ===
In February, it was announced that Biles was chosen to represent the United States at the Tokyo World Cup taking place on April 4. However, in March USA Gymnastics announced that Biles would not attend due to concerns about the ongoing COVID-19 pandemic both domestically and worldwide (including Japan). The following day the Japanese Gymnastics Association announced that they had canceled the event.

=== 2021 ===
In May, Biles competed at the U.S. Classic. She debuted a Yurchenko double pike vault, which no woman had ever completed before, en route to another U.S. Classic all-around title. The new vault was given a preliminary D-score of 6.6, making it the highest-valued vault in women's gymnastics.

In June, Biles competed at the U.S. National Championships and won her 7th national all-around title and qualified for the Olympic Trials. In addition to winning the all-around title by 4.7 points, Biles also placed first in the vault, balance beam, and floor exercise, as well as third in the uneven bars. At the Olympic Trials, Biles placed first and earned an automatic spot on the Olympic team. She finished 2.266 points ahead of second-place finisher Sunisa Lee; however Lee's day two score of the competition (58.166) was higher than Biles's (57.533), which was the first time anyone had posted a higher single-day all-around score than Biles since Kyla Ross in 2013. Also named to the Olympic team were Lee, Biles's club teammate Jordan Chiles, and Grace McCallum.

==== 2020 Summer Olympics ====
At the 2020 Olympic Games, held in July and August 2021, Biles performed the all-around during the qualifications and helped the United States qualify for the team final, in second place behind the Russian team. She suffered several mishaps during qualifications: she bounced entirely off the floor landing on one of her tumbling passes and stepped one foot off the landing mat during her Cheng vault, and took several large stumbles back on her balance beam dismount. Despite these mistakes, Biles still qualified for the all-around final in first place. She also qualified in first place for the vault final, advanced to the floor exercise final in second place behind Vanessa Ferrari, and qualified for the balance beam and uneven bars finals. She was the only athlete to qualify for all the individual finals.

Following her qualifications performance, Biles stated on Instagram that she was "[feeling] the weight of the world on [her] shoulders" and that she felt affected by the pressure of the Olympics.

"I say put mental health first. Because if you don't, then you're not going to enjoy your sport and you're not going to succeed as much as you want to. So it's OK sometimes to even sit out the big competitions to focus on yourself, because it shows how strong of a competitor and person that you really are — rather than just battle through it."

— Simone Biles after withdrawing from the team final

During warm-ups for the first rotation of the team final, Biles balked on her Amanar vault mid-air, performing 1.5 twists instead of the expected 2.5. She repeated this in the competition, balking and performing the 1.5 twist with a large lunge and near-fall on the landing, and scored just 13.766 with a difficulty score of 5.0 (rather than the Amanar's 5.8). She subsequently left the competition floor (although she returned to the floor a few minutes later) and withdrew from the rest of the team competition, citing mental health issues. Biles later explained that she was inspired by fellow female Olympian Naomi Osaka, who had withdrawn from the French Open and Wimbledon Championships earlier in the year for similar reasons. The U.S. team went on to win the silver medal behind the Russian athletes. On July 28, 2021, Biles withdrew from the finals of the individual all-around competition, again citing mental health concerns. Following further medical evaluation on July 30, she also withdrew from the vault and uneven bars finals, both scheduled for the first day of the individual event finals. Due to a continued mental block, on July 31, Biles also withdrew from the floor final, scheduled for the second day of individual event finals, while still leaving the possibility of competing in the balance beam final on the last day of the event finals. She later confirmed on August 2 that she would compete in the beam final. Although Biles performed a relatively scaled-down routine with an easier double pike dismount in the beam final, she won the bronze medal behind China's Guan Chenchen and Tang Xijing. With the bronze, she tied Shannon Miller for most Olympic medals by an American female gymnast with seven total. Biles also tied Soviet/Russian female gymnast Larisa Latynina for most medals won by a woman of all time, with 32 combined World and Olympic medals. She called her bronze beam medal her most meaningful one, as she felt it symbolized her focus on mental health and her perseverance. Biles later revealed that her aunt had died unexpectedly two days before the beam event final.

Biles explained that she withdrew primarily due to experiencing "the twisties", a psychological phenomenon causing a gymnast to lose air awareness while performing twisting elements, throughout the Olympics. She noted that while it was not the first time she had had the twisties on vault or floor, it was the first time she experienced them on uneven bars and balance beam. Biles made the decision to withdraw after the first rotation of the team final because she felt that she had "simply got so lost [her] safety was at risk as well as a team medal". During the week, Juntendo University allowed Biles to practice at their gym, located an hour outside of Tokyo, where she could practice quietly away from the public eye.

Some commentators criticized Biles, accusing her of being a "quitter" or selfishly depriving another athlete of the chance to compete. She was also slandered with racist, sexist, and transphobic comments in the Russian state-owned media, as well as having been openly accused of being a drug cheat due to her therapeutic use exemption for ADHD medication. Multiple gymnasts, however, defended Biles's decision and relayed their own stories of struggling with the twisties. Biles's decision to prioritize her mental health was generally widely praised and credited with starting a wider conversation about the role of mental health in sports. Alongside Biles, other Olympians in Tokyo also showed greater willingness to discuss and publicly acknowledge mental health issues, indicative of a wider approach to sport where athletes are prioritizing their health over performance.

=== 2023 ===
In late June, it was announced that Biles would return to competition at the 2023 U.S. Classic, held on August 5 in the Chicago metropolitan area. She competed all four events for an all-around score of 59.100, finishing exactly five points ahead of runner-up Leanne Wong. Biles also placed first on balance beam (14.800) and floor exercise (14.900). Although she did not attempt a second vault, she did complete a Yurchenko double pike. Biles also obtained the necessary qualification score to advance to the 2023 U.S. National Championships. At the National Championships Biles won her eighth national all-around title ahead of Shilese Jones and Leanne Wong. Additionally, she placed first on balance beam and floor exercise and third on uneven bars behind Jones and Skye Blakely. With her eighth national title, Biles broke the record of Al Jochim, who won seven titles on the national level, the last one in 1933. Additionally Biles became the oldest woman to win the title at 26 years and 166 days old; she surpassed Linda Metheny Mulvihill, who was 24 and 100 days in 1971.

In September, Biles attended the U.S. women's selection camp for the 2023 World Artistic Gymnastics Championships and 2023 Pan American Artistic Gymnastics Championships, held in Katy, Texas. Despite two falls, she won the first day of competition with an all-around score of 55.700 which granted her automatic qualification to the U.S. Worlds team.

==== 2023 World Championships ====
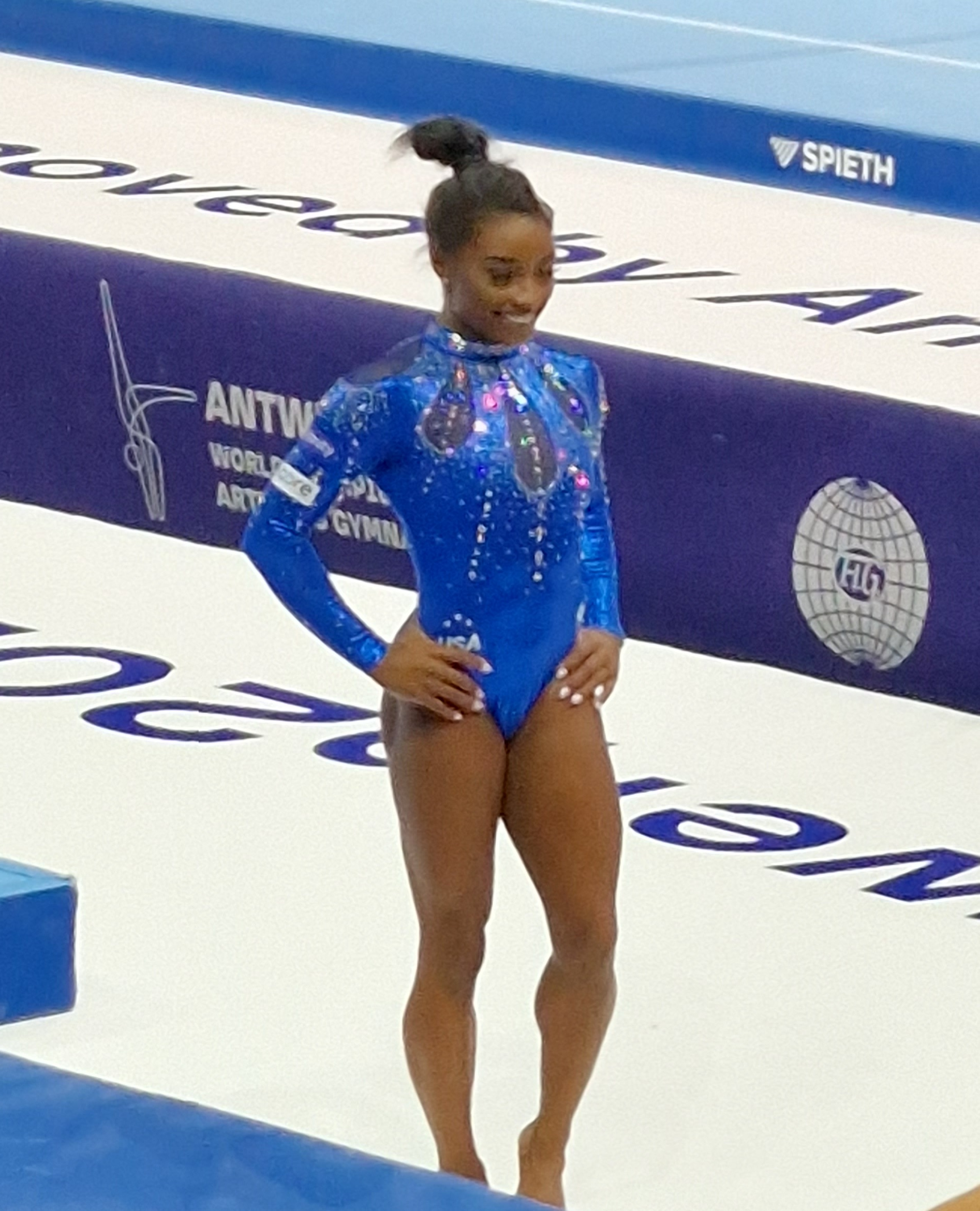
Biles at the 2023 World Championships in Antwerp

At the World Championships, Biles qualified in first place in the all-around final with a score of 58.932, nearly two points ahead of teammate Shilese Jones. She also qualified in first place to every event final except for the uneven bars, where she placed 5th, earning a spot in that final. This made her the only gymnast to qualify for all individual event finals, at these World Championships.

In the team competition, Biles hit her routines on every event, contributing scores of 14.800, 14.466, 14.300, and 15.166 on vault, uneven bars, balance beam, and floor exercise, respectively, to help the US to an unprecedented seventh consecutive team gold medal.

In the all-around competition, Biles hit all her routines, save for a small stumble during her choreography on floor exercise. She received the highest scores of the day on vault, balance beam, and floor exercise and earned her sixth world all-around gold medal with an overall score of 58.399, ahead of Brazil's Rebeca Andrade and Biles's teammate Jones. With this, Simone Biles surpassed Vitaly Scherbo as the most successful gymnast of all time at the Olympics and World Championships. In addition, she became the only gymnast besides Kōhei Uchimura to win the all-around title six times.

In the vault final, Biles fell on her first vault, the Yurchenko double pike, and also incurred a deduction of 0.5 due to her coach spotting her on the podium. Despite this, she earned the silver medal with an average score of 14.549, only 0.201 points behind Andrade. In the uneven bars final, she placed 5th with a score of 14.200. In the balance beam final, she placed first with a score of 14.800, one-tenth of a point ahead of the silver medalist Zhou Yaqin. During the floor exercise final she won the gold medal with a score of 14.633 after a one-tenth penalty for a step out of bounds, finishing with a lead of just .133 over Rebeca Andrade. By winning an unprecedented sixth gold medal on floor, Biles also became the first gymnast in world championships history to win that many titles on one apparatus.

=== 2024 ===
Biles opened her season at the Core Hydration Classic on May 18, where she placed first in the all-around and won her seventh career U.S. Classic all-around title. Additionally she recorded the highest single-vault score and placed first on floor exercise and second on uneven bars and balance beam behind Shilese Jones and Sunisa Lee respectively.

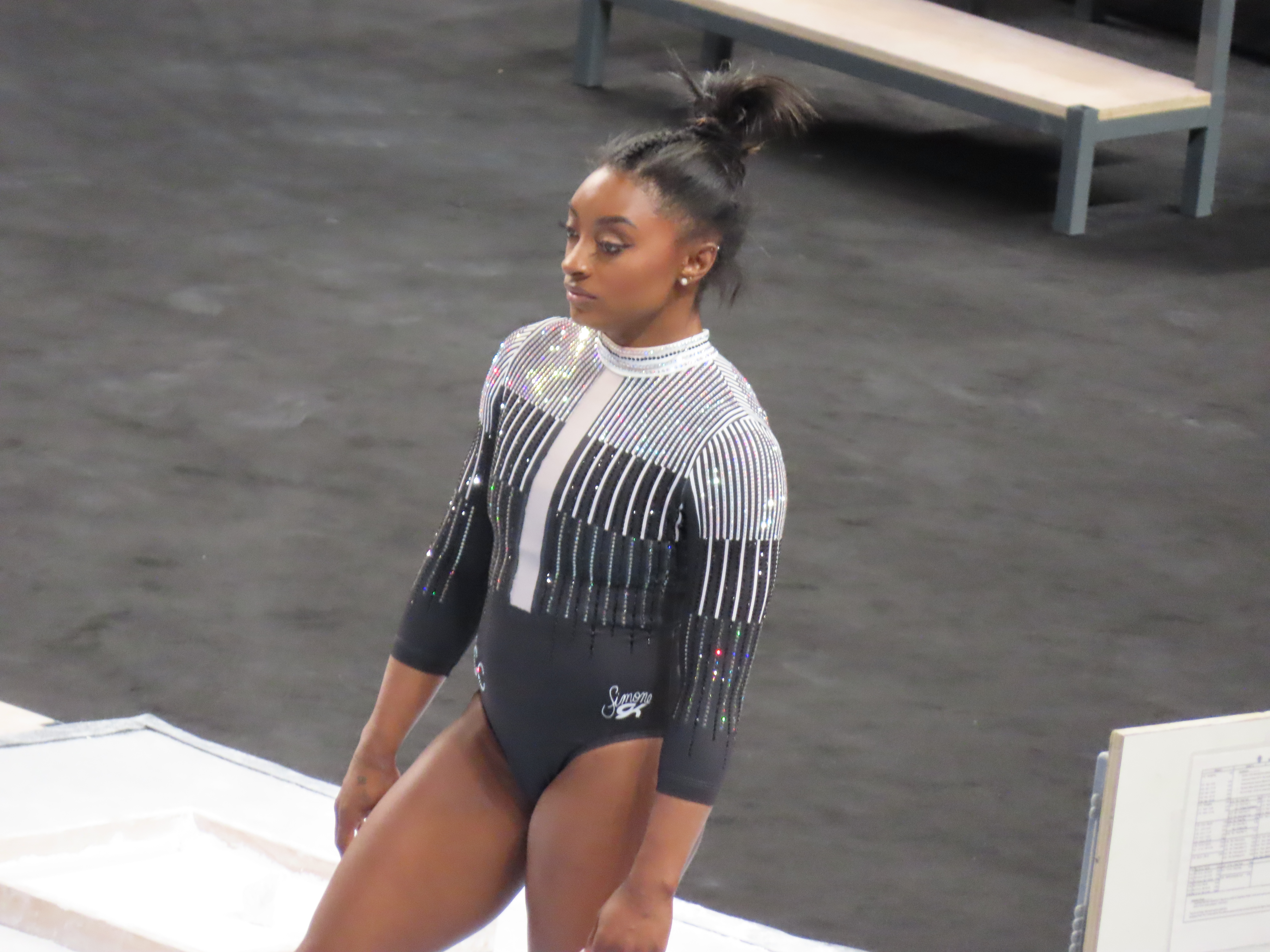
Biles at the 2024 U.S. National Championships

At the U.S. Gymnastics Championships, she won the gold medal in all events and became the first gymnast to win nine all-around titles at the event. She won 5.9 points ahead of second-place finisher Skye Blakely. Biles's all-around score on day one of 60.450 was the highest recorded score in this Olympic quad. As a result, she qualified for the Olympic trials.

At the Olympic trials, Biles placed first in the all-around, second on uneven bars, fourth on balance beam, and first on floor exercise. Despite falling off the balance beam on day two of the competition, she still won by over five points ahead of the runner-up Sunisa Lee. After the competition, she was selected to represent the United States at the 2024 Paris Olympics alongside Jade Carey, Jordan Chiles, Lee, and Hezly Rivera.

==== 2024 Summer Olympics ====
Biles became the fourth American female artistic gymnast to compete at three Olympic Games.

Ahead of the 2024 Paris Olympics, Biles submitted a new skill for the code of points for the uneven bars, a Weiler kip with 1.5 pirouette, which would make her the only female gymnast to have a skill named on every apparatus. She ultimately did not compete the skill.

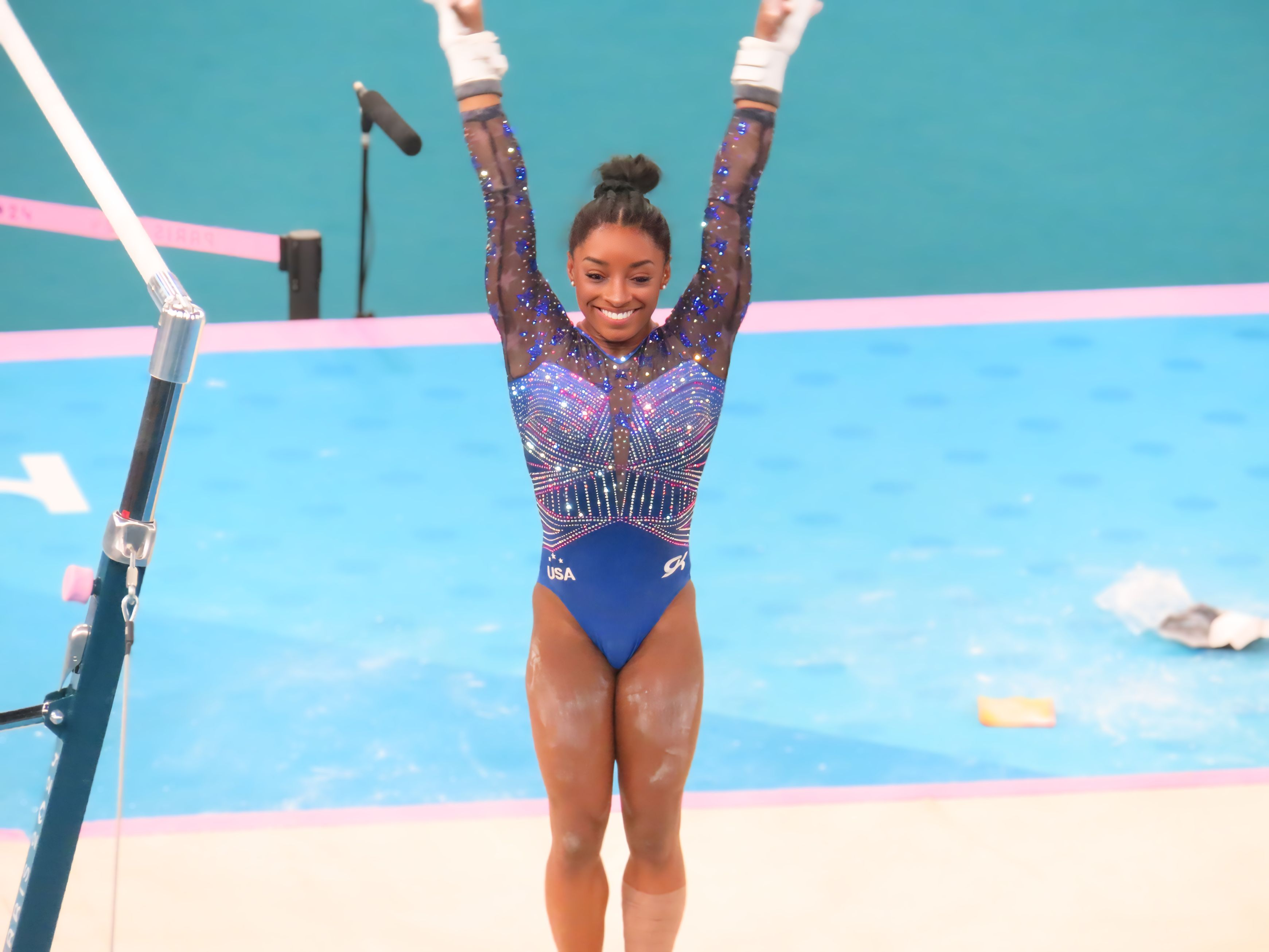
Biles at the 2024 Olympic Games

During the qualification round, Biles and her team qualified for the team final in first place. Individually she qualified to the all around, vault, balance beam and floor exercise finals. Additionally she was the first reserve for the uneven bars final. During the team final Biles competed on all four apparatuses and helped the United States win the gold medal ahead of second place Italy.

During the all-around final, Biles placed first ahead of rival Rebeca Andrade and defending champion Sunisa Lee, despite an uncharacteristic mistake on the uneven bars that left her behind Andrade and Kaylia Nemour after two of four rotations. Biles recovered by recording the top scores on balance beam and floor exercise of the night to win the competition. In winning the all-around competition Biles became the third female artistic gymnast to win two Olympic all-around titles after Larisa Latynina (1956–1960) and Věra Čáslavská (1964–1968) and the first to do so non-consecutively. She is one of eight Olympic gymnasts in any discipline to win two all-around titles along with Latynina, Caslavska, Alberto Braglia (MAG), Viktor Chukarin (MAG), Sawao Kato (MAG), Kohei Uchimura (MAG), and Evgeniya Kanaeva (RG); no one has ever won three.

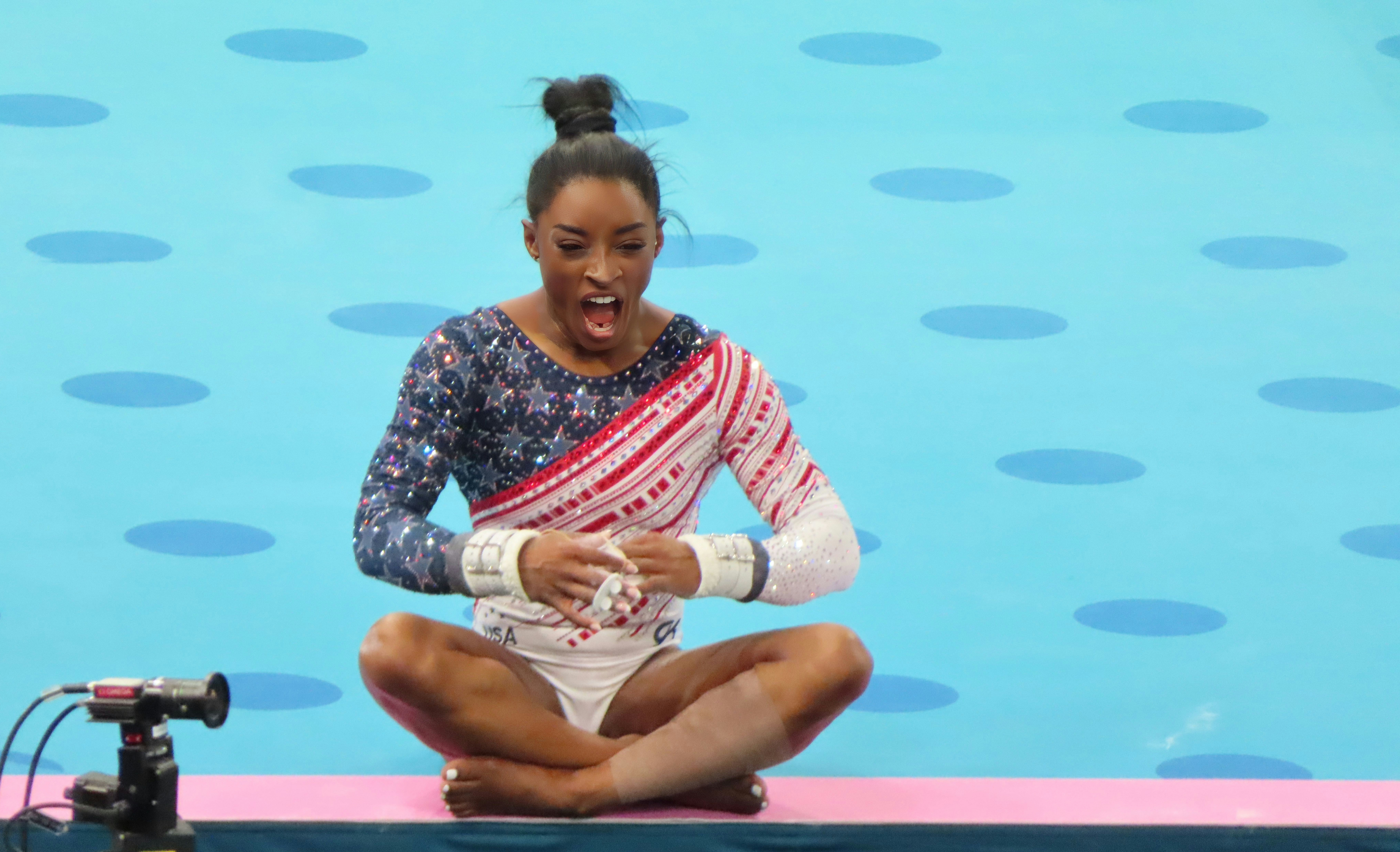
Biles yawning at the 2024 Olympic Games

During the vault final, Biles performed her eponymous Biles II (Yurchenko double pike) and a Cheng to win the gold medal; as a result, she became the second woman after Čáslavská to win two Olympic vault titles. During the balance beam final, Biles fell off the apparatus and incurred a three-tenth neutral deduction for not properly saluting the judges at the conclusion of her routine. She finished fifth as a result. This marked the first time in her nine appearances in Olympic or World Championship beam finals that she did not win a medal; nevertheless, she is the most decorated gymnast on balance beam of all time with four gold and four bronze medals at Olympic and World Championship competition.

During the floor exercise final, Biles incurred six-tenths worth of neutral deductions for going out of bounds. She scored 0.033 points less than Rebeca Andrade and won the silver medal. This marked the first time ever in Biles's senior international career that she did not win floor exercise, ending her streak of 10 consecutive international gold medals on the apparatus.

After the gymnastics apparatus finals, Biles began wearing a medical boot for ceremonies and interviews due to a calf injury in her left leg that she had aggravated during the qualification round. At the closing ceremony, Biles was part of the ceremonial passing of the Olympic flag, signifying the end of the 2024 Paris Olympics and the transition into the 2028 Los Angeles Olympics.

== Awards and recognition ==
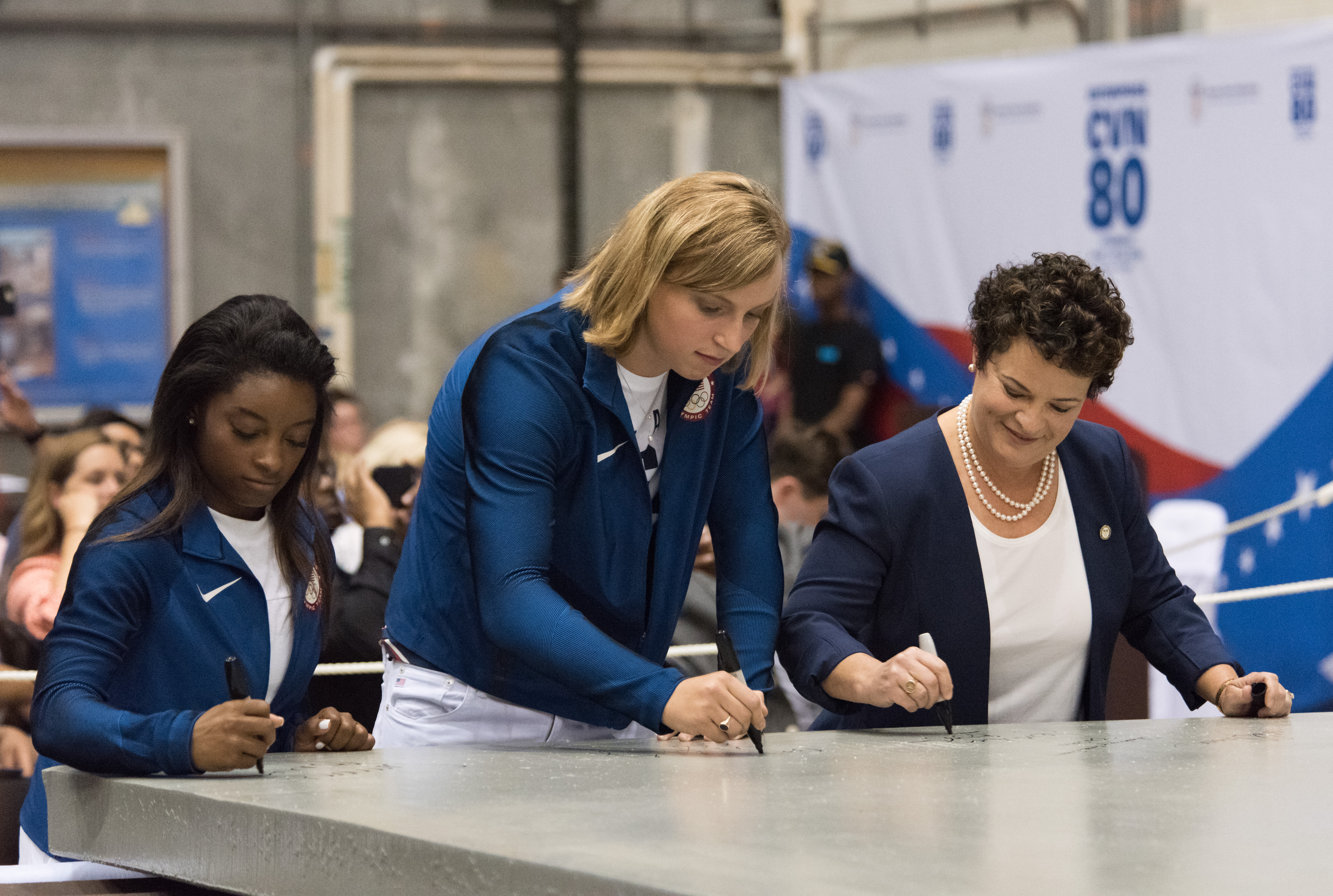
Biles signs a 35-ton steel plate alongside fellow Olympic champion Katie Ledecky and NNS president Jennifer Boykin to signal the start of construction of the USS Enterprise

Biles was named Sportswoman of the Year by the Women's Sports Foundation in 2014, and after the world championships, she was named one of ESPNW's Impact 25. She was named Team USA Female Olympic Athlete of the Year in December 2015, the fourth person to win the honor. In December 2016, Biles was chosen as one of the sponsors of the U.S. Navy aircraft carrier USS Enterprise, alongside Olympic gold medal-winning swimmer Katie Ledecky. They are the first Olympians to be given this honor. In 2016, Biles won the Glamour Award for the Record Breaker. That same year, she was chosen as one of BBC's 100 Women as well as ESPN's Woman of the Year. In 2016, Biles became the third gymnast, after Olga Korbut and Nadia Comăneci, to be named the BBC Overseas Sports Personality of the Year.

In July 2017, Biles won the ESPY Award for Best Female Athlete, the second gymnast to win this award, after Nastia Liukin won it in 2009. In 2017, Simone won the Shorty Awards for the best in sports. At the 2017 Teen Choice Awards, Simone won favorite female athlete. In 2017, Biles won Laureus World Sports Award for Sportswoman of the Year. In 2017, Biles was awarded the Golden Plate Award of the American Academy of Achievement. In 2018, Biles was inducted into the Texas Women's Hall of Fame. In May 2018, Biles and the other survivors were awarded the Arthur Ashe Courage Award. In December, Biles was named ESPN The Magazine's most dominant athlete of 2018. In February 2019, Biles was named Laureus World Sports Award in the category of Sportswoman of the Year for the second time, beating out tennis players Simona Halep and Angelique Kerber, snowboarder Ester Ledecká, triathlete Daniela Ryf, and skier Mikaela Shiffrin. Biles was nominated for the 2019 ESPY Award for Best Female Athlete but lost to soccer player Alex Morgan. In November 2019, Biles won the People's Choice Award for Game Changer of 2019. In February 2020, Biles was awarded the Laureus World Sports Award for Sportswoman of the Year for the second consecutive year and third time overall, beating out nominees Allyson Felix, Megan Rapinoe, Mikaela Shiffrin, Naomi Osaka, and Shelly-Ann Fraser. Biles has appeared on the covers of such magazines as Vogue, Vanity Fair, Essence, and People.

In February 2021, Biles criticized ESPN's SportsCenter for including no women in their "Greatest of All Time" photograph. In September 2021, she was named to the Time 100, an annual list of the 100 most influential people in the world, for "championing mental health".

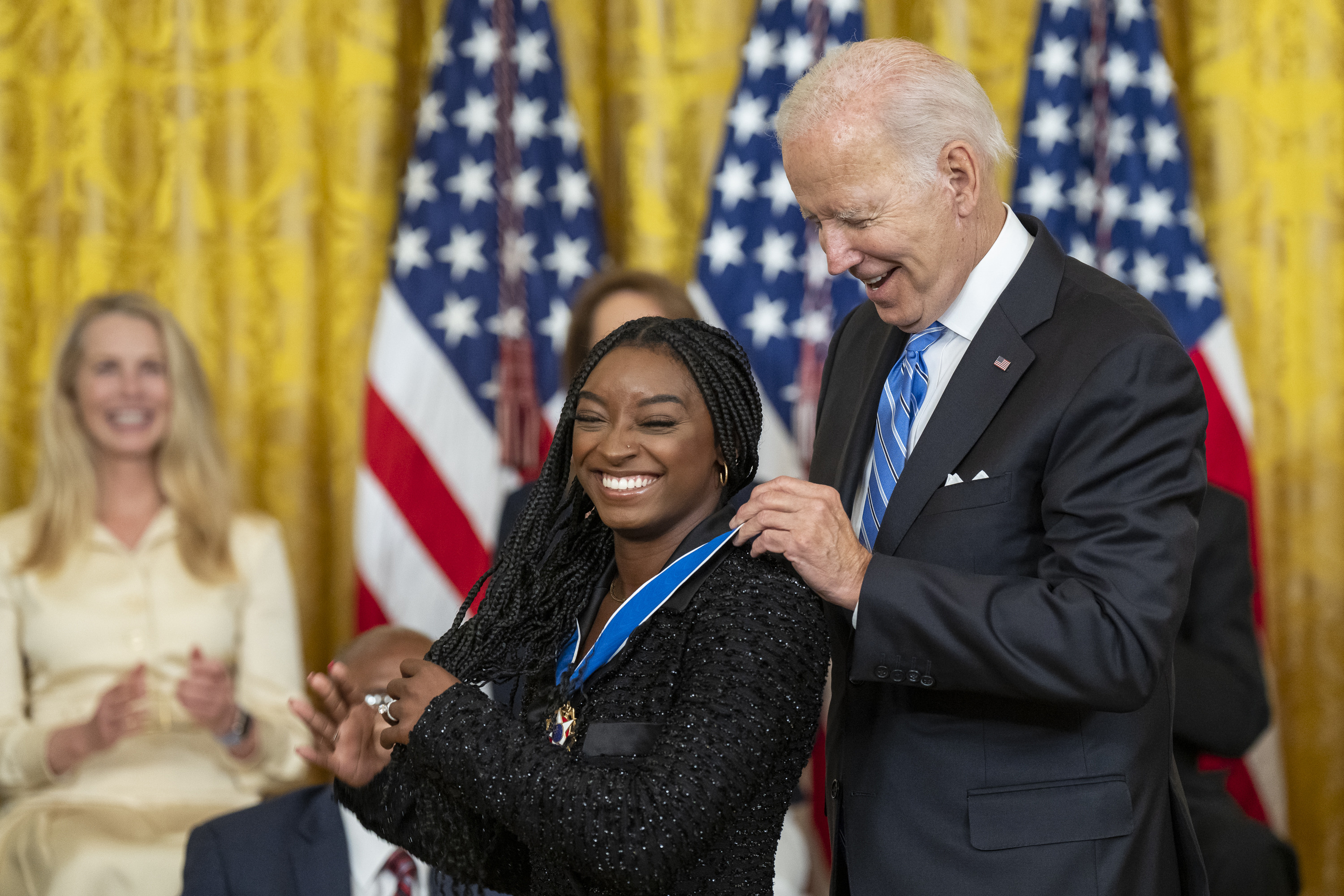
Biles awarded the Presidential Medal of Freedom by President Joe Biden in July 2022

On July 7, 2022, Biles became the youngest person to receive the Presidential Medal of Freedom, the nation's highest honor given to civilians. She was among 17 honorees, including Megan Rapinoe, honored by President Joe Biden at the White House.

In December 2023, Biles was named Associated Press Female Athlete of the Year for the third time (2016, 2019, 2023) and named international female Champion of Champions by L'Équipe for the fourth time (2016, 2018, 2019, 2023).

In April 2024, Biles was awarded her fourth Laureus World Sports Award in the category of Comeback of the Year. In July 2024, she received the Best Comeback Athlete ESPY Award. Biles was named Sports Illustrated's 2024 Sportsperson of the Year for winning three gold medals at the 2024 Summer Olympics, for changing gymnastics in the United States, and altering conversations about athletes. In August 2024, the International Sports Press Association (AIPS) voted her as the third-best female athlete of the past 100 years, after Serena Williams and Nadia Comăneci.

In April 2025, Biles was awarded her fifth Laureus World Sports Award in the category of Sportswoman of the Year for the fourth time. The following month, Biles was awarded an honorary doctorate in humane letters from Washington University in St. Louis.

At the 2025 ESPY Awards, Biles won the Best Championship Performance award and Best Female Athlete ESPY Award, becoming the sixth person to win the latter award twice.

== Sponsors and endorsements ==
Biles signed with the Octagon sports agency in July 2015, which also markets fellow American gymnast Aly Raisman and Olympic swimmer Michael Phelps. In November 2015, she announced her sponsorship by Nike. On November 23, 2015, she signed a deal to allow GK Elite Sportswear to sell a line of leotards bearing her name. Later in 2015, Biles signed a deal with Core Power to become a spokesperson on its Everyday Awesome team of athletes. In August 2016, Kellogg's put the Final Five's picture on the Gold Medal Edition of Special berries; the back of the box showed Biles with one of her Rio gold medals. After the 2016 Rio games, Biles signed deals to endorse Procter & Gamble, The Hershey Company, and United Airlines. In September 2016, Biles became a spokesperson for Mattress Firm's program of supporting foster homes. In 2016, Biles signed a deal with Spieth America to create a line of gymnastics equipment, and another to become a spokesperson for Beats By Dr Dre. In 2018, she worked with Caboodles to create and market products for women with active lifestyles. In April 2021, Biles announced that she was leaving Nike for a new apparel sponsorship with the Gap's Athleta brand. In 2023, Biles became a featured athlete on Wheaties cereal boxes.

== Personal life ==
=== Relationships ===
Biles was in a relationship with fellow gymnast Stacey Ervin Jr. from August 2017 to March 2020.

She began dating professional American football player Jonathan Owens in August 2020. They met through the dating app Raya. Biles announced her engagement to Owens on February 15, 2022, and they were married on April 22, 2023.

=== Health ===
In September 2017, Biles spoke about having attention deficit hyperactivity disorder (ADHD) after her medical records were leaked online, revealing that she had been taking Ritalin (methylphenidate) to treat the condition during the Olympics. Having been diagnosed as a child, she had previously disclosed her condition to the World Anti-Doping Agency and obtained a medical exemption, allowing her to take the medication during competition. Biles said that ADHD is "nothing to be ashamed of and nothing that I'm afraid to let people know."

Biles underwent a breast augmentation in June 2025 and has openly discussed details of the procedure. She has also disclosed receiving other cosmetic plastic surgery procedures including a lower blepharoplasty and earlobe surgery.

=== Tattoos ===
As of mid-2024, Simone Biles had seven tattoos. She got her first—the Olympic rings on her right forearm—after competing in the 2016 Summer Olympics. She also has a butterfly tattoo on the back of her right hand, an "XO" tattoo on her inner lip, a "Golden" tattoo on her inner left wrist, a "1997" tattoo just above her elbow, an "I Shall Rise" tattoo on her clavicle, and, on an unknown location, a "444" tattoo that matches Owens'.

=== Volunteering ===
In 2021, Biles became an ambassador for Friends of the Children, a nonprofit organization that provides professional mentorship to at-risk youth. She spoke to children in the program about her experiences in foster care and about the support the nonprofit provides to children in foster care. During her Gold Over America tour, Biles donated $50,000 towards the opening of a Houston chapter for the organization.

== Skills ==
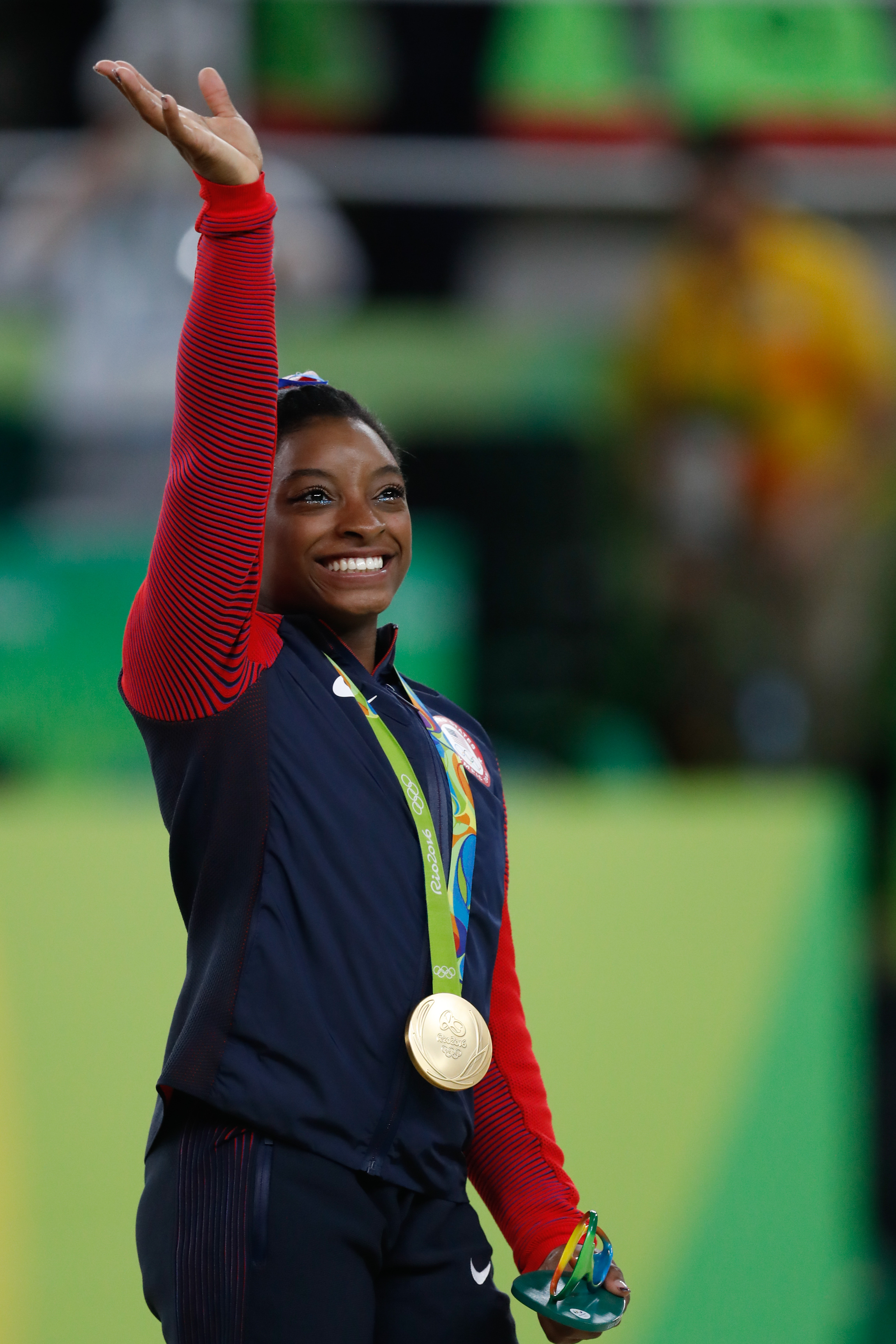
Biles at the 2016 Olympics all-around podium

Biles is known for performing extraordinarily difficult skills well. Her 2023 routine on vault and her 2024 routine on floor exercise are the most difficult ever performed in women's artistic gymnastics. As of 2024, she is the sole gymnast to have competed four floor-exercise skills valued at H or higher in the 2022–2024 Code of Points.

Skills rated E or higher that she has performed in her senior career include:

Overview of Simone Biles's gymnastics skills
Apparatus	Name/Skill	Description	Difficulty (Note: Valid for the 2025–2028 Code of Points)	Performed
Vault	López	Yurchenko 1/2-on entry, layout salto forwards with 1/2 twist off (aka "1/2 on–1/2 off")	4.8	2013–15
Vault	Amanar	Yurchenko entry on, layout salto backwards with 2 1/2 twists	5.4	2013–21
Vault	Cheng	Yurchenko 1/2-on entry, layout salto forwards with 1 1/2 twists off (aka "1/2 on–1 1/2 off")	5.6	2016–24
Vault	Biles	Yurchenko 1/2-on entry, layout salto forwards with 2 twists off (aka "1/2 on–double full off")	6.0	2018
Vault	Biles II	Yurchenko entry on, double piked salto backwards off	6.4	2021–24
Uneven bars	Piked Tkatchev	Counter reverse piked hecht over high bar	E	2013, 2015–24
Uneven bars	Van Leeuwen	Toe-on Shaposhnikova transition with 1/2 twist to high bar	E	2018–24
Uneven bars	Fabrichnova	Dismount: Double-twisting (2/1) double tucked salto backwards	F	2018–21, 2024
Balance beam	Front pike	Piked salto forwards to cross stand	E	2018
Balance beam	Layout	Layout salto backwards with legs together (to two feet)	E	2013
Balance beam	Mitchell	1080° (3/1) turn in tuck stand on one leg	E	2018–24
Balance beam	Double pike	Dismount: Double piked salto backwards	E	2021
Balance beam	Barani	Jump forward with 1/2 twist to tucked salto backwards	F	2015–18
Balance beam	Full-in	Dismount: Full-twisting (1/1) double tucked salto backwards	G	2013–24
Balance beam	Biles	Dismount: Double-twisting (2/1) double tucked salto backwards	H	2019, 2021
Floor exercise	Mitchell	1080° (3/1) turn in tuck stand on one leg	E	2021
Floor exercise	Mukhina	Full-twisting (1/1) double tucked salto backwards	E	2013–21
Floor exercise	Double layout	Double layout salto backwards	F	2013–14, 2023–24
Floor exercise	Biles	Double layout salto with 1/2 twist	G	2013–24
Floor exercise	Silivas	Double-twisting (2/1) double tucked salto backwards	H	2013–24
Floor exercise	Chusovitina	Full-twisting (1/1) double layout salto backwards	H	2015–16, 2019, 2023
Floor exercise	Moors	Double-twisting (2/1) double layout salto backwards	I	2018
Floor exercise	Biles II	Triple-twisting (3/1) double tucked salto backwards	J	2019–21, 2024

=== Eponymous skills ===
Biles's named elements on vault, balance beam, and floor exercise introduced during the 2017–2021 quad are the most difficult elements on each apparatus (the Biles on beam, Biles on vault, and Biles II on floor). She was the sole gymnast to have performed any of these skills in an FIG international competition until Hillary Heron of Panama performed the Biles I on floor at the 2023 World Championships. In May 2021, she became the first woman to complete a Yurchenko double piked on the vault during competition.

Gymnastics elements named after Simone Biles
Apparatus	Name	Description	Difficulty	Competition completed
Vault	Biles	Yurchenko 1/2 entry on–forward layout double twist off	6.0	2018 World Championships
Vault	Biles II	Yurchenko entry on–double piked backwards off	6.4	2023 World Championships
Balance beam	Biles	Backward double-twisting (2/1) double tucked dismount	H (0.8)	2019 World Championships
Floor exercise	Biles	Backward double layout salto 1/2 twist out	G (0.7)	2013 World Championships
Floor exercise	Biles II	Backward triple-twisting (3/1) double tucked	J (1.0)	2019 World Championships

== Competitive history ==
Competitive history of Simone Biles at the junior level
Year	Event	Team	AA	VT	UB	BB	FX
2011	American Classic		3rd place, bronze medalist(s)	1st place, gold medalist(s)	8	1st place, gold medalist(s)	4
2011	U.S. Classic		20	5			5
2011	U.S. National Championships		14	7	22	10	12
2012	U.S. Classic		1st place, gold medalist(s)	1st place, gold medalist(s)		6	2nd place, silver medalist(s)
2012	U.S. National Championships		3rd place, bronze medalist(s)	1st place, gold medalist(s)	6	6	6

Competitive history of Simone Biles at the senior level
Year	Event	Team	AA	VT	UB	BB	FX
2013	American Cup		2nd place, silver medalist(s)				
2013	City of Jesolo Trophy	1st place, gold medalist(s)	1st place, gold medalist(s)	1st place, gold medalist(s)		1st place, gold medalist(s)	1st place, gold medalist(s)
2013	Chemnitz Friendly	1st place, gold medalist(s)	2nd place, silver medalist(s)	1st place, gold medalist(s)		1st place, gold medalist(s)	1st place, gold medalist(s)
2013	U.S. Classic					7	8
2013	U.S. National Championships		1st place, gold medalist(s)	2nd place, silver medalist(s)	2nd place, silver medalist(s)	2nd place, silver medalist(s)	2nd place, silver medalist(s)
2013	World Championships	—N/a	1st place, gold medalist(s)	2nd place, silver medalist(s)	4	3rd place, bronze medalist(s)	1st place, gold medalist(s)
2014	U.S. Classic		1st place, gold medalist(s)	1st place, gold medalist(s)	4	1st place, gold medalist(s)	1st place, gold medalist(s)
2014	U.S. National Championships		1st place, gold medalist(s)	1st place, gold medalist(s)	4	2nd place, silver medalist(s)	1st place, gold medalist(s)
2014	World Championships	1st place, gold medalist(s)	1st place, gold medalist(s)	2nd place, silver medalist(s)		1st place, gold medalist(s)	1st place, gold medalist(s)
2015	American Cup		1st place, gold medalist(s)				
2015	City of Jesolo Trophy	1st place, gold medalist(s)	1st place, gold medalist(s)	1st place, gold medalist(s)		1st place, gold medalist(s)	1st place, gold medalist(s)
2015	U.S. Classic		1st place, gold medalist(s)	1st place, gold medalist(s)	4	1st place, gold medalist(s)	1st place, gold medalist(s)
2015	U.S. National Championships		1st place, gold medalist(s)	1st place, gold medalist(s)	5	1st place, gold medalist(s)	2nd place, silver medalist(s)
2015	World Championships	1st place, gold medalist(s)	1st place, gold medalist(s)	3rd place, bronze medalist(s)		1st place, gold medalist(s)	1st place, gold medalist(s)
2016	Pacific Rim Championships	1st place, gold medalist(s)	1st place, gold medalist(s)				
2016	U.S. Classic				5	1st place, gold medalist(s)	
2016	U.S. National Championships		1st place, gold medalist(s)	1st place, gold medalist(s)	4	1st place, gold medalist(s)	1st place, gold medalist(s)
2016	Olympic Trials		1st place, gold medalist(s)	1st place, gold medalist(s)	4	4	1st place, gold medalist(s)
2016	Olympic Games	1st place, gold medalist(s)	1st place, gold medalist(s)	1st place, gold medalist(s)		3rd place, bronze medalist(s)	1st place, gold medalist(s)
2018	U.S. Classic		1st place, gold medalist(s)		10	1st place, gold medalist(s)	1st place, gold medalist(s)
2018	U.S. National Championships		1st place, gold medalist(s)	1st place, gold medalist(s)	1st place, gold medalist(s)	1st place, gold medalist(s)	1st place, gold medalist(s)
2018	Worlds Team Selection Camp		1st place, gold medalist(s)	1st place, gold medalist(s)	2nd place, silver medalist(s)	4	1st place, gold medalist(s)
2018	World Championships	1st place, gold medalist(s)	1st place, gold medalist(s)	1st place, gold medalist(s)	2nd place, silver medalist(s)	3rd place, bronze medalist(s)	1st place, gold medalist(s)
2019	Stuttgart World Cup		1st place, gold medalist(s)				
2019	U.S. Classic		1st place, gold medalist(s)		5	3rd place, bronze medalist(s)	1st place, gold medalist(s)
2019	U.S. National Championships		1st place, gold medalist(s)	1st place, gold medalist(s)	3rd place, bronze medalist(s)	1st place, gold medalist(s)	1st place, gold medalist(s)
2019	Worlds Team Selection Camp	1st place, gold medalist(s)	1st place, gold medalist(s)	4	2nd place, silver medalist(s)	1st place, gold medalist(s)	
2019	World Championships	1st place, gold medalist(s)	1st place, gold medalist(s)	1st place, gold medalist(s)	5	1st place, gold medalist(s)	1st place, gold medalist(s)
2021	U.S. Classic		1st place, gold medalist(s)		15	1st place, gold medalist(s)	1st place, gold medalist(s)
2021	U.S. National Championships		1st place, gold medalist(s)	1st place, gold medalist(s)	3rd place, bronze medalist(s)	1st place, gold medalist(s)	1st place, gold medalist(s)
2021	Olympic Trials		1st place, gold medalist(s)	1st place, gold medalist(s)	3rd place, bronze medalist(s)	3rd place, bronze medalist(s)	1st place, gold medalist(s)
2021	Olympic Games	2nd place, silver medalist(s)	WD	WD	WD	3rd place, bronze medalist(s)	WD
2023	U.S. Classic		1st place, gold medalist(s)		3rd place, bronze medalist(s)	1st place, gold medalist(s)	1st place, gold medalist(s)
2023	U.S. National Championships		1st place, gold medalist(s)		3rd place, bronze medalist(s)	1st place, gold medalist(s)	1st place, gold medalist(s)
2023	Worlds Team Selection Camp		1st place, gold medalist(s)		13	3rd place, bronze medalist(s)	1st place, gold medalist(s)
2023	World Championships	1st place, gold medalist(s)	1st place, gold medalist(s)	2nd place, silver medalist(s)	5	1st place, gold medalist(s)	1st place, gold medalist(s)
2024	U.S. Classic		1st place, gold medalist(s)		2nd place, silver medalist(s)	2nd place, silver medalist(s)	1st place, gold medalist(s)
2024	U.S. National Championships		1st place, gold medalist(s)	1st place, gold medalist(s)	1st place, gold medalist(s)	1st place, gold medalist(s)	1st place, gold medalist(s)
2024	Olympic Trials		1st place, gold medalist(s)		2nd place, silver medalist(s)	4	1st place, gold medalist(s)
2024	Olympic Games	1st place, gold medalist(s)	1st place, gold medalist(s)	1st place, gold medalist(s)	R1	5	2nd place, silver medalist(s)

== Filmography ==
=== Documentary ===
Year	Title	Notes	Ref.
2024	Simone Biles Rising	2 episodes	
2024	Simone Biles Rising: Part Two	2 episodes	

== See also ==
- Final Five – the gold medal-winning team at the 2016 Summer Olympics
- MeToo movement
- List of Olympic female artistic gymnasts for the United States
- List of top female medalists at major artistic gymnastics events

Awards
Preceded by Katie Ledecky	USOC Sportswoman of the Year; 2014–15	Succeeded by Katie Ledecky
Preceded by (New Zealand) Dan Carter	BBC Overseas Sports Personality of the Year; 2016	Succeeded by (Switzerland) Roger Federer
Preceded by (United States) Serena Williams (United States) Katie Ledecky	L'Équipe Champion of Champions; 2016; 2018, 2019	Succeeded by (United States) Katie Ledecky (Norway) Marte Olsbu Røiseland
Preceded by (United States) Serena Williams (United States) Serena Williams	Laureus World Sportswoman of the Year; 2017; 2019–2020	Succeeded by (United States) Serena Williams (Japan) Naomi Osaka
