= World Champions Centre =

American artistic gymnastics academy

World Champions Centre Elite
- Full name: World Champions Centre Elite
- Nicknames: WCC
- Sport: Artistic gymnastics
- Founded: 2014
- Based in: Spring, Texas
- Owner: Ron & Nellie Biles
- Head coach: Patrick Kiens; Daymon Jones
- Manager: Zachary Francis
- Website: worldchampionscentre.com

World Champions Centre (WCC) is an American artistic gymnastics academy, located in Spring, Texas. It is home to Olympic champion Simone Biles and is owned by her family.

== History ==
After the 2013 World Artistic Gymnastics Championships, Aimee Boorman, the longtime coach of Simone Biles, was looking to leave Bannon's Gymnastix. As a result, Biles' mother, Nellie, who co-owned a chain of fourteen nursing homes around Texas, suggested that the family build a gym. World Champions Centre originally opened in March 2014 in a temporary center before moving in September to a warehouse. It features a 29,000-square-foot (2,700 m^{2}) gym floor. The gym opened to the public in May 2016.

== Biles International Invitational ==
The inaugural Biles Invitational was held in 2018 at World Champions Centre.

Starting in 2020, the event served as a qualifying meet for the Nastia Liukin Cup.

== Notable gymnasts and alumni ==
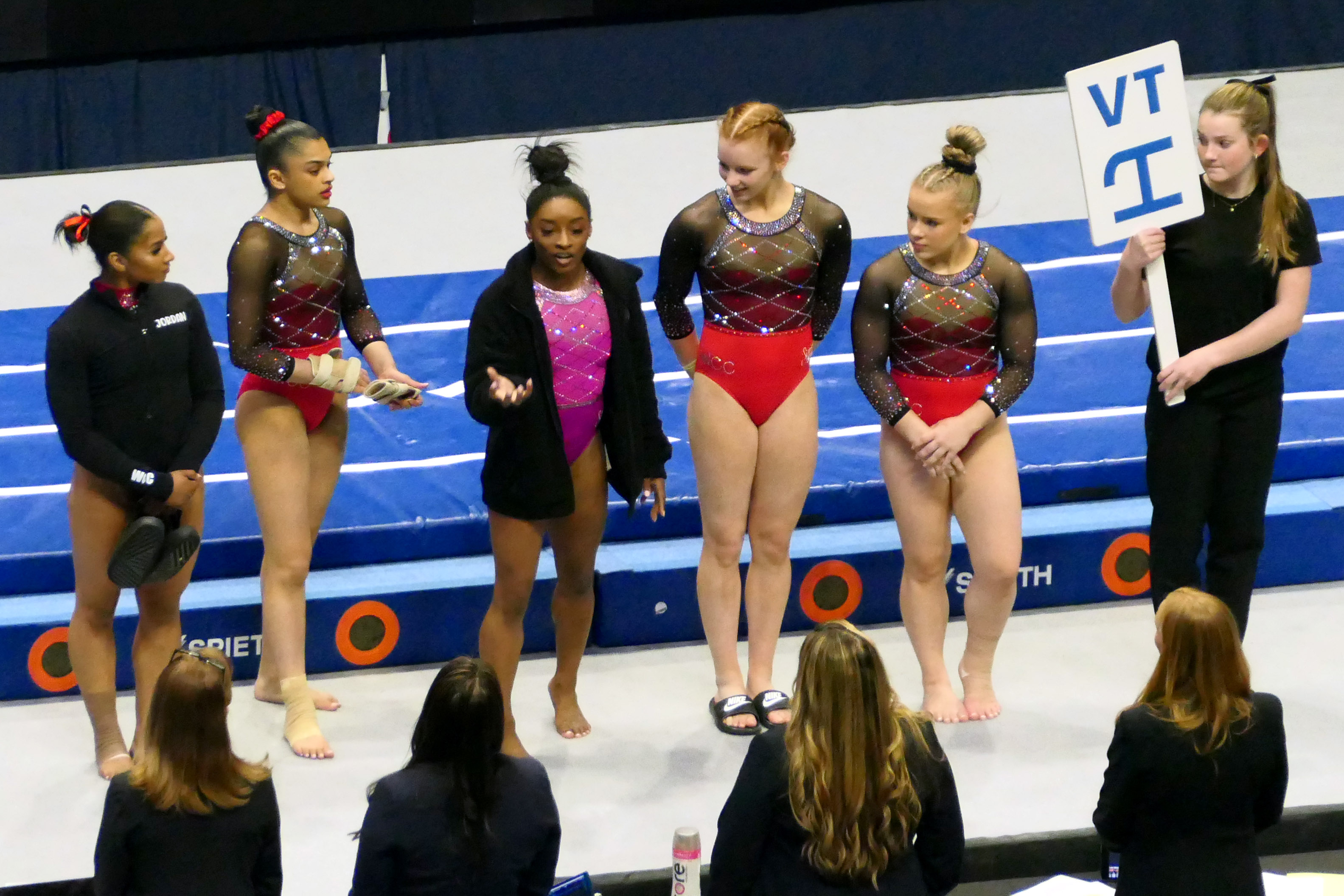
World Champions Centre gymnasts at the 2024 U.S. Classic

Notable World Champions Centre gymnasts include Olympians Simone Biles (2016, 2020, 2024) and Jordan Chiles (2020, 2024), as well as 2024 Olympic alternate Joscelyn Roberson. All three are additionally World Champions (Biles 2013–2015, 2018–2019, 2023, Chiles 2022, and Roberson 2023). French Olympian and World bronze medalist Mélanie de Jesus dos Santos began training at WCC in 2022.

Additionally Pan American Games champions Zoe Miller and Tiana Sumanasekera train at WCC.
