= Aimee Boorman =

American artistic gymnastics coach (born 1973)

- Born: Aimee Banghart; March 27, 1973 (age 53); Chicago, Illinois, United States
- Education: Northern Illinois University (1991-95)
- Occupation: Gymnastics coach
- Known for: Personal coach of Simone Biles
- Spouse: James Boorman (m. 2000)
- Children: 3

Aimee Boorman (born Aimee Banghart; March 27, 1973) is an American artistic gymnastics coach. She coached 2016 Olympic champion and 2013–2015 world champion Simone Biles. She was the USA women's gymnastics team head coach at the 2016 Rio Olympics. Since 2021, she serves as an assistant coach for the Netherlands' women's gymnastic team. As of May 2025, she will coach in Stuttgart, Germany for 5 months.

== Early life ==
Aimee Boorman was born and raised by a single mother in the Rogers Park area of Chicago. She began gymnastics classes with the Chicago Park District at age 6. To help earn money at age 13, she started coaching at the Lakeshore Gymnastics Club. She attended Lane Technical High School, which had a strong gymnastics program, where she excelled in floor exercises, winning the city championship in that event as a freshman.

She realized she would not become an Olympic gymnast herself, but she considered continuing in the sport as a coach. In college at Northern Illinois University she became a member of the social sorority Delta Phi Epsilon. While at first reluctant to continue coaching and pursue a degree, she missed the sport and took a part-time coaching position. She graduated with a business degree related to sports management in 1995. That same year, when her friend had interviews in Houston, she went along on a whim and lined up interviews for herself. She was offered a coaching job.

== Coaching career ==
Boorman's first coaching job in Texas was at Cypress Academy of Gymnastics located in Houston. Boorman started working at Bannon's Gymnastix in 1996. She began coaching Simone Biles in 2005, when Biles was eight years old. Biles rose to prominence in 2013 after becoming U.S. national champion and world all-around champion in her senior debut.

Boorman was the head coach at Bannon's, where Biles trained under her, until 2014, when they both left. She and Biles temporarily trained at AIM Athletics in The Woodlands, Texas, until Biles' parents' new gymnastics facility, World Champions Centre, opened. The facility is located in Spring, Texas, and Boorman was the team manager and head coach.

Boorman was named head coach of the United States women gymnastics team for the 2016 Summer Olympics in Rio de Janeiro.

Post-Olympics, she left World Champions Centre and took the executive director position at Evo Athletics in Sarasota, FL.

== Personal life ==
Boorman was raised in Chicago and resides in Florida. Boorman married husband James in 2000. Together the couple has three children.
