= Briley Casanova =

American gymnast

Briley Casanova (born November 17, 1994) is an American gymnast. She is a former International Elite who competed for the Michigan Wolverines women's gymnastics team. Casanova shared the Unsung Hero award with Talia Chiarelli in 2015. Before Michigan, Casanova competed in the 2009 International Junior Gymnastics Competition in Japan.

== Achievements ==
- Full scholarship to the University of Michigan
- 2009 Junior Japan International: 3rd AA, 3rd UB
- 2009 Jr. USAG National Team Member
- 2008 Jr. USAG National Team Member
