= Canoeing at the 1936 Summer Olympics =

Canoeing at the Games of the XI Olympiad
- Sprint pictogram
- Venue: Langer See, Grünau
- Dates: 7–8 August 1936
- Competitors: 119 from 19 nations

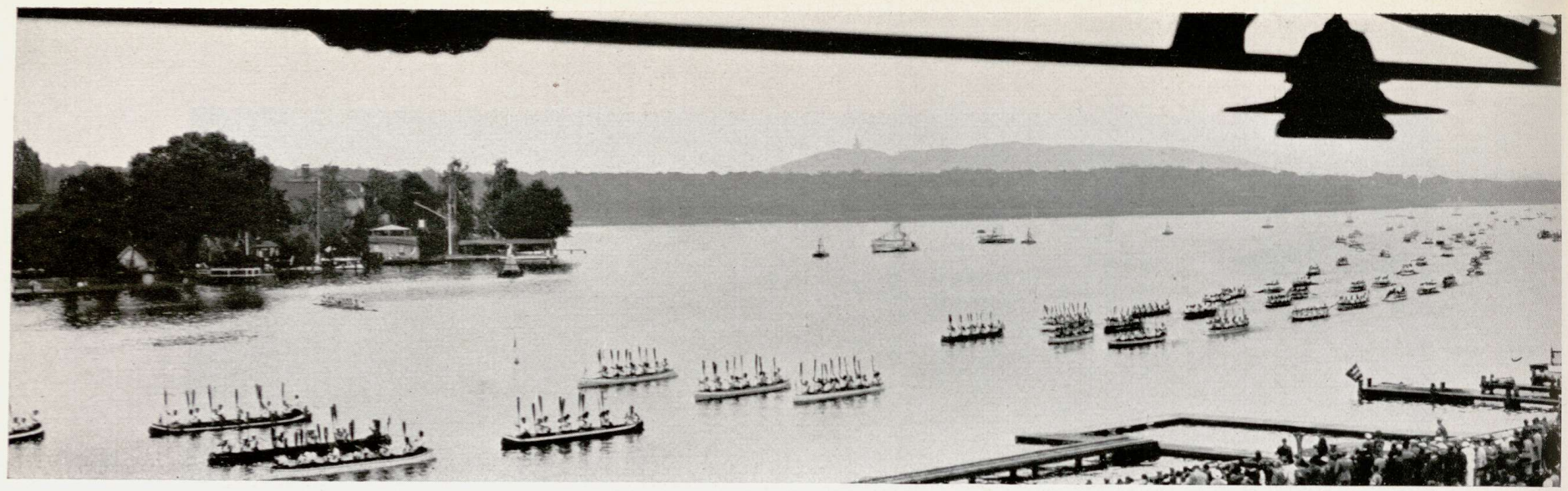
Parade of 116 ten-seater Canadian Canoes at 1936 Olympic Games

Canoeing was an official Olympic sport for the first time at the 1936 Summer Olympics in Berlin. It had been a demonstration sport twelve years earlier at the 1924 Summer Olympics in Paris. A total of nine events were contested at the 1936 Games, all in canoe sprint for men. In total, 158 canoeists from 19 nations took part in the canoe races. All these countries had sent in entries before the deadline; the only late entry came from Latvia, which was as a result excluded from participating in the canoeing competitions.

The competitions were held on August 7 and 8, 1936. They were held on a regatta course at Grünau on the Langer See.

== Medal table ==
| Rank | Nation | Gold | Silver | Bronze | Total |
|---|---|---|---|---|---|
| 1 | Austria | 3 | 3 | 1 | 7 |
| 2 | Germany | 2 | 3 | 2 | 7 |
| 3 | Czechoslovakia | 2 | 1 | 0 | 3 |
| 4 | Canada | 1 | 1 | 1 | 3 |
| 5 | Sweden | 1 | 0 | 1 | 2 |
| 6 | France | 0 | 1 | 0 | 1 |
| 7 | Netherlands | 0 | 0 | 3 | 3 |
| 8 | United States | 0 | 0 | 1 | 1 |
| Totals (8 entries) | | 9 | 9 | 9 | 27 |

== Medal summary ==
| Games | Gold | Silver | Bronze |
|---|---|---|---|
| C-1 1000 m | Frank Amyot (CAN) | Bohuslav Karlík (TCH) | Erich Koschik (GER) |
| C-2 1000 m | Jan Brzák-Felix and Vladimír Syrovátka (TCH) | Rupert Weinstabl and Karl Proisl (AUT) | Frank Saker and Harvey Charters (CAN) |
| C-2 10000 m | Václav Mottl and Zdeněk Škrland (TCH) | Frank Saker and Harvey Charters (CAN) | Rupert Weinstabl and Karl Proisl (AUT) |
| K-1 1000 m | Gregor Hradetzky (AUT) | Helmut Cämmerer (GER) | Jaap Kraaier (NED) |
| K-1 10000 m | Ernst Krebs (GER) | Fritz Landertinger (AUT) | Ernest Riedel (USA) |
| K-1 10000 m folding | Gregor Hradetzky (AUT) | Henri Eberhardt (FRA) | Xaver Hörmann (GER) |
| K-2 1000 m | Adolf Kainz and Alfons Dorfner (AUT) | Ewald Tilker and Fritz Bondroit (GER) | Nicolaas Tates and Wim van der Kroft (NED) |
| K-2 10000 m | Paul Wevers and Ludwig Landen (GER) | Viktor Kalisch and Karl Steinhuber (AUT) | Tage Fahlborg and Helge Larsson (SWE) |
| K-2 10000 m folding | Erik Bladström and Sven Johansson (SWE) | Erich Hanisch and Willi Horn (GER) | Piet Wijdekop and Kees Wijdekop (NED) |

== Participating nations ==
A total of 119 canoers from 19 nations competed at the Berlin Games:

- Austria (9)
- Belgium (8)
- Canada (8)
- Czechoslovakia (13)
- Denmark (4)
- Finland (3)
- France (3)
- Germany (14)
- Great Britain (4)
- Hungary (5)
- Italy (1)
- Luxembourg (3)
- Netherlands (9)
- Norway (1)
- Poland (2)
- Sweden (9)
- Switzerland (9)
- United States (10)
- Yugoslavia (4)
