= Deaths in March 2001 =

The following is a list of notable deaths in March 2001.

Entries for each day are listed alphabetically by surname. A typical entry lists information in the following sequence:

- Name, age, country of citizenship at birth, subsequent country of citizenship (if applicable), reason for notability, cause of death (if known), and reference.

== March 2001 ==
=== 1 ===
- Joseph Cyril Bamford, 84, British businessman.
- Ray Dorr, 59, American college football player (West Virginia Wesleyan) and coach (Southern Illinois, Kentucky, Texas A&M), ALS.
- Albert Heschong, 82, American television, film and theater production designer (winner of Emmy Award for Art Direction for Requiem for a Heavyweight), cerebral hemorrhage.
- John Painter, 112, American supercentarian, world's oldest man, heart attack.
- Orlando Pantera, 33, Cape Verdean singer and composer, acute pancreatitis.
- Hannie Termeulen, 72, Dutch Olympic freestyle swimmer (1948, 1952).
- Henry Wade, 86, American lawyer and district attorney of Dallas County, Parkinson's disease.
- Colin Webster, 68, Welsh international footballer, lung cancer.

=== 2 ===
- John Diamond, 47, British Journalist, oesophageal cancer.
- George F. D. Duff, 74, Canadian mathematician.
- Louis Faurer, 84, American street photographer.
- Lonnie Glosson, 93, American country musician, songwriter, and radio personality, natural causes.
- Wallace D. Hayes, 82, American engineer and one of the world's leading theoretical aerodynamicists.
- Mildred Brown Schrumpf, 98, American economist, food educator, and author.
- William Grant Stratton, 87, American politician, governor of Illinois (1953-1961).

=== 3 ===
- Roger Buchonnet, 74, French cyclist.
- Louis Edmonds, 77, American actor (Dark Shadows, All My Children), respiratory failure.
- A. Maitland Emmet, 92, British amateur entomologist and schoolmaster.
- Maija Isola, 73, Finnish designer of printed textiles.
- Jean-Baptiste Leclerc, 80, French Olympic wrestler (1948, 1952).
- Gabriel Lisette, 81, Chadian politician.
- Jay T. Robbins, 81, Career officer in the American Air Force.
- Ruhi Sarıalp, 76, Turkish track and field athlete and Olympic medalist (1948).
- Eugene Sledge, 77, American Marine and professor, stomach cancer.

=== 4 ===
- Gerardo Barbero, 39, Argentine chess grandmaster, cancer.
- Jean René Bazaine, 96, French painter, designer of stained glass windows and writer.
- Clyde Coffman, 89, American decathlon athlete and Olympian (1932).
- Glenn Hughes, 50, American singer and member of pop group The Village People, lung cancer.
- Brian Jones, 72, British motorcycle designer.
- Fred Lasswell, 84, American cartoonist (Barney Google and Snuffy Smith), heart failure.
- Jim Rhodes, 91, American politician (61st and 63rd governor of the State of Ohio), heart problems.
- Harold Stassen, 93, American politician (25th governor of Minnesota), natural causes.
- Kalle Tuulos, 70, Finnish figure skater and Olympian (1952, 1956).
- Shammai Zahn, 80, Polish-born British rabbi.

=== 5 ===
- Rankin Britt, 85, American football player (Texas A&M, Philadelphia Eagles).
- Frans De Mulder, 63, Belgian road racing cyclist, heart attack.
- Jacques Maloubier, 81, French painter.
- Ian McHarg, 80, Scottish architect, pulmonary disease.
- Leo Thomas, 77, American baseball player (St. Louis Browns, Chicago White Sox).

=== 6 ===
- Mário Covas, 70, Brazilian engineer and politician, bladder cancer.
- Doc Dennis, 83, American baseball player.
- Luce d'Eramo, 75, Italian author and critic.
- Nane Germon, 91, French actress.
- Balla Moussa Keïta, Malian actor and comedian, pulmonary emphysema.
- Ngọc Lan, 44, Vietnamese singer-lyricist, multiple sclerosis.
- Kathleen Le Rossignol, 92, British Olympic diver (1928).
- Portia Nelson, 80, American cabaret singer, songwriter, actress (The Sound of Music, Doctor Dolittle, All My Children), and author, cancer.
- Roderic O'Connor, 93, American painter.
- Darrell A. Posey, 53, American anthropologist and biologist, brain tumor.
- Jim Taylor, 83, English footballer.
- Kim Walker, 32, American actress (Heathers, Say Anything..., The Outsiders), brain tumor.

=== 7 ===
- Frankie Carle, 97, American pianist, bandleader and composer ("Sunrise Serenade"), natural causes.
- Inge Edler, 89, Swedish cardiologist.
- Hank Foldberg, 77, American gridiron football player (Brooklyn Dodgers, Chicago Hornets) and coach.
- Ebbe Nielsen, 50, Danish entomologist and lepidoptera researcher, heart attack.
- Marian Norkowski, 65, Polish football player and Olympian (1960).
- Janice O'Hara, 82, American baseball player.
- Al Palladini, 57, Canadian politician, heart attack.

=== 8 ===
- Frances Adaskin, 100, Canadian pianist.
- Abe Cohen, 67, American gridiron football player (Boston Patriots).
- Ninette de Valois, 102, British ballet dancer, teacher, choreographer and director of classical ballet.
- Robert Ealey, 75, American electric blues singer.
- Bent Hansen, 67, Danish Olympic football player (1960).
- Hugh Malone, 57, American surveyor and politician, accidental death.
- Takashige Matsumoto, 92, Japanese Olympic water polo player (1932).
- Luís Rocha, 63, Brazilian politician and lawyer, diabetes.
- Bazaryn Shirendev, 88, Mongolian historian and politician.
- Edward Winter, 63, American actor (Cabaret, Promises, Promises, M*A*S*H), Parkinson's disease.

=== 9 ===
- Vincent Alo, 96, American mobster (Genovese crime family), natural causes.
- Spencer Bernard, 83, American politician.
- Soemitro Djojohadikoesoemo, 83, Indonesian economist and politician and the father of Prabowo Subianto, heart failure.
- Henry Jonsson, 88, Swedish Olympic runner (1936).
- Hermann Kugelstadt, 89, German screenwriter and film director.
- Poldek Pfefferberg, 87, Polish-American Holocaust survivor.
- Giancarlo Prete, 58, Italian actor, brain cancer.
- Diane Sommerfield, 51, American actress (Days of Our Lives).
- Richard Stone, 47, American composer and songwriter (Animaniacs, Pinky and the Brain, Freakazoid!), pancreatic cancer.

=== 10 ===
- Arturo Alcaraz, 84, Filipino volcanologist.
- Algodão, 76, Brazilian basketball player and Olympic medalist (1948, 1952, 1956, 1960).
- Henri Brasseur, 94, Belgian Olympic fencer (1928, 1936).
- Ab Conway, 86, Canadian Olympic middle-distance runner (1936).
- Michael Elkins, 84, American broadcaster and journalist (CBS, Newsweek, BBC).
- Nikos Georgiadis, 77, Greek-British set designer for ballet, stage and film.
- Frank Marsh, 76, American politician.
- Massimo Morsello, 42, Italian fascist and political singer-songwriter, cancer.
- Jorge Recalde, 49, Argentine rally driver, heart attack while racing.
- Valdemar de Silveira, 85, Brazilian Olympic weightlifter (1952).
- Vladimir Voroshilov, 70, Soviet and Russian author, producer and television anchorman, heart attack.
- Sir Michael Woodruff, 89, British surgeon and scientist, and a pioneer in organ transplant surgery.

=== 11 ===
- Finn Ferner, 81, Norwegian Olympic sailor (1952, 1960).
- Kaj Jørgensen, 75, Danish footballer.
- Rafaela Chacón Nardi, 75, Cuban poet and educator.
- Jørn Ording, 85, Norwegian actor and screenwriter.
- Miloslav Ošmera, 77, Czech Olympic ice hockey player (1952).
- Ted Schmitt, 84, American gridiron football player (Philadelphia Eagles).

=== 12 ===
- Alina Cichecka, 84, Polish Olympic gymnast (1936).
- Morton Downey Jr., 67, American television personality (The Morton Downey Jr. Show) and actor (Predator 2), lung cancer and pneumonia.
- Dave Dunaway, 56, American NFL football player (Green Bay Packers, Atlanta Falcons, New York Giants).
- Alan Greene, 89, American Olympic diver (1936).
- Sai Gwa-Pau, 82, Hong Kong film actor, diabetes.
- Sir Lancelot, 98, Trinidadian-American singer ("Rum and Coca-Cola") and actor, natural causes.
- Henry Lee Lucas, 64, American convicted killer, congestive heart failure.
- Robert Ludlum, 73, American author of spy novels (The Bourne Identity), burn.
- Bill Reeder, 79, American baseball player (St. Louis Cardinals).
- Sidney Dillon Ripley, 87, American ornithologist and conservationist, complications from Alzheimer's disease.
- Victor Westhoff, 84, Dutch botanist.

=== 13 ===
- John A. Alonzo, 66, American cinematographer (Chinatown, Scarface, Norma Rae).
- Encarnacion Alzona, 105, Filipino historian, and suffragist.
- Bill Bland, 84, British communist.
- Jean Bretonnière, 76, French actor and singer.
- Vincent Dantzer, 77, Canadian politician (member of the House of Commons of Canada, mayor of Edmonton, Alberta), heart attack.
- Walter Dukes, 70, American professional basketball player (New York Knicks, Minneapolis Lakers, Detroit Pistons), natural causes.
- Benny Martin, 72, American bluegrass fiddler.
- Cord Meyer, 80, American Central Intelligence Agency official, lymphoma.
- Cranley Onslow, 74, British politician.
- Antonia Palacios, 96, Venezuelan poet, novelist and essayist.
- Norman Rodway, 72, Irish actor (Royal Shakespeare Company).
- Jutta Rüdiger, 90, German psychologist and head of the Nazi Party League of German Girls (Bund Deutscher Mädel) during World War II.

=== 14 ===
- Rosine Deréan, 91, French actress.
- Arthur Deremer, 83, American football player (Brooklyn Dodgers).
- Anne George, 73, American author and poet, complications during heart surgery.
- Lawrence Clark Powell, 94, American librarian, literary critic, and author.
- Paul Rémy, 78, French tennis player.
- Della Sehorn, 73, American competition swimmer and Olympian (1952).

=== 15 ===
- John Anderson, 76, American Olympic canoeist (1952).
- Gaetano Cozzi, 78, Italian historian.
- Durward Gorham Hall, 90, American politician (U.S. Representative for Missouri's 7th congressional district from 1961 to 1973).
- Ryszard Koncewicz, 89, Polish soccer player and coach.
- Gunnar Lundqvist, 85, Swedish Olympic canoeist (1936).
- Henrik Schildt, 86, Finnish-Swedish film actor.
- Ann Sothern, 92, American actress (The Ann Sothern Show, Maisie, The Whales of August), stroke.

=== 16 ===
- Johannes Benzing, 88, German nazi diplomat and linguist during World War II.
- Otfried Deubner, 92, German classical archaeologist and diplomat.
- Juliette Huot, 89, Canadian actress (The Plouffe Family, 14, rue de Galais, Amanita Pestilens, The Luck of Ginger Coffey), cancer.
- Norma MacMillan, 79, Canadian cartoon voice actress (The New Casper Cartoon Show, The Gumby Show, Davey and Goliath).
- Isao Okawa, 74, Japanese businessman and chairman of Sega, heart disease.
- Maria von Tasnady, 89, Hungarian singer and stage and film actress.
- Bob Wollek, 57, French race car driver, struck by a van while cycling.

=== 17 ===
- Michiyo Aratama, 71, Japanese actress, heart attack.
- Ingrid Borthen, 87, Norwegian-Swedish stage and film actress.
- Grace Cole, 78, American politician.
- Arthur Covington, 87, Canadian physicist and radio astronomer.
- Viktor Krivulin, 56, Russian poet, novelist and essayist.
- Maynard Mack, 91, American literary critic and English professor.
- Abraham Lincoln Marovitz, 95, American district judge (United States District Court for the Northern District of Illinois), kidney failure.
- Kaarto Rask, 72, Finnish Olympic shot putter (1952).
- Sherwin Rosen, 62, American labor economist.
- Richard Steere, 92, American Olympic fencer (1932).
- Anthony Storr, 80, English psychiatrist, psychoanalyst, and author.
- Ralph Thomas, 85, English film director.
- Zinaida Voronina, 53, Soviet Olympic gymnast (1968).

=== 18 ===
- Vasily Abaev, 100, Ethnically Ossetian Soviet linguist specializing in Iranian.
- John Ardoin, 66, American music critic and author.
- Teófilo Borunda, 89, Mexican politician.
- John Phillips, 65, American singer, promoter and co-founder of The Mamas & the Papas, heart failure.
- Dirk Polder, 81, Dutch physicist.
- Gyula Tóth, 73, Hungarian wrestler and Olympian (1956, 1960).
- Antoine Uyterhoeven, 70, Belgian Olympic sprinter (1952).

=== 19 ===
- Gordon Brown, 53, Scottish rugby union player, non-Hodgkin lymphoma.
- Boris Gregorka, 94, Yugoslavian Olympic gymnast (1928, 1936).
- Charles K. Johnson, 76, American flat-earther (President of the International Flat Earth Research Society).
- Walter Ian Harewood Johnston, 71, Australian pioneer of reproductive medicine, laryngeal cancer.
- Herbie Jones, 75, American jazz trumpeter and arranger, complications from diabetes.
- Jacob Kainen, 91, American painter and printmaker.
- Norman Mitchell, 82, English actor (It Ain't Half Hot Mum, Oliver!, Beryl's Lot).

=== 20 ===
- Luis Alvarado, 52, Puerto Rican baseball player, heart attack.
- Jay Cameron, 72, American jazz musician.
- Henry Carpenter, 75, British boxer and Olympian (1948).
- Ronald Chetwynd-Hayes, 81, British author, bronchial pneumonia.
- Doreen Gorsky, 88, British politician, feminist and television producer and executive (BBC Television).
- John J. Hennessey, 79, United States Army general, stroke.
- Frank O'Reilly, 76, Irish Olympic racewalker (1960).
- Frank Reynolds, 83, British and English field hockey player and Olympian (1948).
- William Kernahan Thomas, 90, American district judge (United States District Court for the Northern District of Ohio).
- Ilie Verdeț, 75, Romanian communist politician, heart attack.

=== 21 ===
- Dora Alonso, 90, Cuban journalist and writer.
- Maurice Arreckx, 83, French politician, cancer.
- Claus Bork Hansen, 37, Danish organized crime figure, shot in an ambush.
- Virgil Hnat, 65, Romanian handball player and coach, heart failure.
- Bill Johansen, 72, Canadian professional ice hockey player (Toronto Maple Leafs), cancer.
- Jeong Ju-yung, 85, South Korean entrepreneur, businessman and founder of the Hyundai Group, pneumonia.
- Wim van der Kroft, 84, Dutch canoeist and Olympic medalist (1936, 1948, 1952).
- Luigi Pennacchio, 68, Italian Olympic ski jumper (1956, 1960).
- Billy Ray Smith, Sr., 66, American football player (Los Angeles Rams, Pittsburgh Steelers, Baltimore Colts), cancer.
- Anthony Steel, 80, British actor and singer (The Wooden Horse, Malta Story, West of Zanzibar, Checkpoint), heart failure.
- Joe Winkler, 79, American gridiron football player (Cleveland Rams).

=== 22 ===
- Stepas Butautas, 75, Lithuanian basketball player and Olympian (1952).
- Sabiha Gökçen, 88, Turkish female aviator and the first female combat pilot of the world, heart failure.
- William Hanna, 90, American animator (Tom & Jerry, The Flintstones, Scooby-Doo), co-founder of Hanna-Barbera, throat cancer.
- Newt Kimball, 85, American baseball player.
- George Knott, 90, Australian politician and Olympic racewalker (1948).
- Barry Maxwell, 12th Baron Farnham, 69, British aristocrat.
- Rolf Birger Pedersen, 61, Norwegian footballer and football coach.
- Edward Samuel Smith, 81, American federal judge.
- Camp Wilson, 78, American football player (Detroit Lions).
- Toby Wing, 85, American actress and pin-up star (Palmy Days, True Confession).

=== 23 ===
- Anthony Bevins, 58, British journalist, pneumonia.
- Sully Boyar, 77, American actor (Dog Day Afternoon, Car Wash, Prizzi's Honor), heart attack.
- Louis Dudek, 83, Canadian poet, academic, and publisher.
- Rowland Evans, 79, American journalist and television host (Evans, Novak, Hunt, & Shields), esophageal cancer.
- Arthur D. Hasler, 93, American ecologist, known for explaining salmon's homing instinct.
- Willie Horne, 79, British rugby league player.
- Margaret Ursula Jones, 84, British archaeologist, known for directing excavations at Mucking, Essex.
- Robert Laxalt, Basque-American writer.
- David McTaggart, 68, Canadian environmentalist and co-founder of Greenpeace International, car accident.
- Karlis Ozols, 88, Latvian SS officer during World War II and chess champion.
- Mischa Richter, 91, American cartoonist and illustrator.

=== 24 ===
- Debabrata Basu, 76, Indian statistician.
- Boris Berlin, 93, Russian-Canadian pianist, teacher and composer.
- N. G. L. Hammond, 93, British classical scholar.
- Tambi Larsen, 86, Danish-American set designer.
- Kazuyoshi Oimatsu, 89, Japanese figure skater, coach and Olympian (1932, 1936).
- Karl Schönböck, 92, Austrian actor, stroke.
- Brian Trubshaw, 77, British test pilot (Concorde).
- Muriel Young, 77, British television announcer, presenter and producer.
- Birgit Åkesson, 93, Swedish choreographer, dancer and dance researcher.

=== 25 ===
- Dominick Basso, 63, American mobster (Chicago Outfit) and bookmaker.
- Terry C. Johnston, 54, American writer of the Old West, colorectal cancer.
- Larry Lansburgh, 89, American producer, director, and screenwriter.
- Barney McGarry, 83, American football player (Cleveland Rams).
- Ray Mitchell, 79, Australian wrestler and Olympian (1956, 1960).
- Tiger Prabhakar, 53, Indian film actor, multiple organ dysfunction syndrome.
- Mattheus Pronk, 53, Dutch racing cyclist.
- Roy Staley, 85, American hurdler and Olympian (1936).

=== 26 ===
- Antoni Adamski, 68, Polish Olympic field hockey player (1952).
- Mary Grace Baloyo, 27, Filipino military pilot, plane crash.
- Michael Cocks, 71, British politician, heart attack.
- Brenda Helser, 76, American Olympic swimmer (1948).
- Suzanne Raeth, 96, French Olympic diver (1924).
- Piotr Sobociński, 43, Polish cinematographer (Three Colours: Red, Ransom, Marvin's Room), heart attack.
- Bill Yates, 79, American cartoonist and comic strip editor, complications from pneumonia and Alzheimer's disease.

=== 27 ===
- Jan Erik Adolfsen, 70, Norwegian Olympic ice hockey player (1952).
- Jim Ailinger, 99, American football player.
- Sir Kenneth Alexander, 79, Scottish economist, non-Hodgkin lymphoma.
- Erik Aschehoug, 74, French Olympic rower (1948).
- Anthony Dexter, 88, American actor (Valentino, Captain John Smith and Pocahontas, The Black Pirates), stroke.
- Robert Lee Massie, 59, American convicted murderer, execution by lethal injection.
- Boris Rauschenbach, 86, Soviet physicist and rocket engineer.
- Giorgio Zuccoli, 43, Italian yacht racer and Olympian (1988, 1992).
- Tereza Štadler, 64, Serbian and Yugoslav chess player.

=== 28 ===
- Jim Benton, 84, American football player (Cleveland/Los Angeles Rams, Chicago Bears), cancer.
- George Connor, 94, American racecar driver.
- Moe Koffman, 72, Canadian flautist and saxophonist, cancer.
- Constantin von Liechtenstein, 89, Liechtenstein prince and Olympic alpine skier (1948).
- Lillian Palmer, 87, Canadian athlete and Olympic silver medalist (1932).
- Vulo Radev, 78, Bulgarian film director, writer, and cinematographer.
- Jørgen Skov, 75, Danish cinematographer.
- James Warren, 88, American film actor and artist.
- Tenny Wyss, 84, Swiss Olympic swimmer (1936).

=== 29 ===
- Edward Frederick Anderson, 69, American botanist.
- Malani Bulathsinhala, 51, Sri Lankan singer.
- Gordon Hahn, 81, American politician (Los Angeles City Council, California State Assembly), pneumonia and respiratory failure.
- Rolando Hernández, 86, Mexican professional wrestler and wrestling trainer, heart attack.
- Helge Ingstad, 101, Norwegian writer and explorer, and discoverer of a North American Viking landing site.
- John Lewis, 80, American jazz pianist (Modern Jazz Quartet), prostate cancer.
- Hollis Sigler, 53, American artist and painter, breast cancer.
- Norman Sisisky, 73, American politician, lung cancer.
- Paul Uellendahl, 81, German Olympic water polo player (1952).
- Kōji Yamamoto, 48, Japanese Olympic basketball player (1976).

=== 30 ===
- Fatiu Ademola Akesode, 61, Nigerian professor of paediatrics.
- Cyrus Herzl Gordon, 92, American scholar.
- Jeffrey Mass, 60, American academic, historian, author and japanologist.
- Maxie McCullagh, 78, Irish Olympic boxer (1948).
- George Mutch, 88, Scottish football player.
- Bert Smith, 75, British Olympic ice hockey player (1948).

=== 31 ===
- Jean-Marc Bory, 67, Swiss actor, cardiac arrest.
- Brian Cole, 22, American baseball player, car crash.
- Diego García, 39, Spanish long-distance runner and Olympian (1992, 1996), heart attack.
- Edward Jewesbury, 83, English actor (Henry V, Crown Court, Dungeons & Dragons).
- Naum Meiman, 88, Soviet mathematician, and dissident.
- David Rocastle, 33, English professional footballer, non-Hodgkin's lymphoma.
- Clifford Shull, 85, American Nobel Prize-winning physicist.
- Colette Thomas, 72, French swimmer and Olympian (1948, 1952, 1956).
- Nakamura Utaemon VI, 84, Japanese kabuki performer.
- Arthur Geoffrey Walker, 91, British mathematician.
- Tochiōyama Yūki, 58, Japanese sumo wrestler.
