= Deaths in February 2004 =

The following is a list of notable deaths in February 2004.

Entries for each day are listed alphabetically by surname. A typical entry lists information in the following sequence:

- Name, age, country of citizenship at birth, subsequent country of citizenship (if applicable), reason for notability, cause of death (if known), and reference.

== February 2004 ==
=== 1 ===
- Art Albrecht, 82, American gridiron football player (Pittsburgh Steelers, Chicago Cardinals, Boston Yanks).
- Alvin Baltrop, 55, American photographer, cancer.
- Ewald Cebula, 86, Polish football player and Olympian (1952).
- Álvaro d'Ors Pérez-Peix, 88, Spanish scholar of Roman law.
- Buzz Gardner, 72, American trumpeter (The Mothers of Invention).
- Valeri Gassy, 54, Ukrainian handball player and Olympian (1972, 1976).
- Mihai Ivăncescu, 61, Romanian football player.
- Ally MacLeod, 72, Scottish football player and manager, Alzheimer's disease.
- Amir Abdullah Khan Niazi, 89, Pakistani military officer.
- Ryszard Pędrak-Janowicz, 71, Polish luger and Olympian (1964).
- Bob Stokoe, 73, English footballer and manager, pneumonia.
- Dino Verde, 81, Italian author, lyricist, playwright and screenwriter.

=== 2 ===
- Alan Bullock, 89, British historian and author.
- Henry Cockburn, 82, English footballer.
- Naohiro Dōgakinai, 89, Japanese politician, governor of Hokkaido.
- Bernard McEveety, 79, American film and television director.
- Róbert Zimonyi, 85, Hungarian Olympic rower (1948, 1952, 1964).

=== 3 ===
- Cornelius Bumpus, 58, American musician (The Doobie Brothers, Steely Dan), heart attack.
- Kaúlza de Arriaga, 89, Portuguese general, writer, and politician, Alzheimer's disease.
- Ted Harding, 82, Australian politician and rugby league football player.
- Keve Hjelm, 81, Swedish actor and film director, prostate cancer.
- John Popovich, 85, American football player (Card-Pitt, Pittsburgh Steelers).
- Jason Raize, 28, American actor (The Lion King, Brother Bear), suicide by hanging.
- William B. Tabler, 89, American architect.
- Frederick Tommy, 62, Canadian Olympic alpine skier (1960).
- Fiep Westendorp, 87, Dutch illustrator.
- Lyle Wicks, 91, Canadian politician.
- Warren Zimmermann, 69, American diplomat, pancreatic cancer.

=== 4 ===
- Valentina Borok, 72, Soviet Ukrainian mathematician.
- Stevo Crvenkovski, 56, Macedonian politician and diplomat.
- Hilda Hilst, 73, Brazilian poet, novelist, and playwright, complications from surgery.
- William MacQuitty, 98, Irish film producer and also a writer and photographer.
- Michael P. Moran, 59, American actor (Scarface, Lean on Me, A Perfect Murder), Guillain–Barré syndrome.
- Malika Pukhraj, 92, Pakistani folk singer.
- Karlheinz Senghas, 75, German botanist and orchidologist.

=== 5 ===
- Sven Agge, 78, Swedish biathlete and Olympian (1960).
- Donald Barr, 82, American educator.
- Sir Robert Boyd, 81, British space scientist.
- John Hench, 95, American artist, designer and director at The Walt Disney Company, heart failure.
- Claude Lemaire, 82, French entomologist.
- Thomas Hinman Moorer, 91, American admiral, Chairman of the Joint Chiefs of Staff.
- Frances Partridge, 103, British writer, last surviving member of the Bloomsbury Group.
- Ernie Price, 53, American football player (Detroit Lions, Seattle Seahawks).
- Nuto Revelli, 84, Italian essayist and partisan.
- Harry West, 86, Northern Irish politician.

=== 6 ===
- Jovan Cokić, 76, Serbian football player.
- Henri Honsia, 90, Belgian Olympic canoeist (1936).
- Masataka Ida, 91, Japanese Army officer and rebel during World War II.
- Jørgen Jersild, 90, Danish composer and music educator.
- Jerome Fox Lederer, 101, American aviation safety pioneer, heart attack.
- John Meyrick, 77, British Olympic rower (1948), and agriculturalist.
- Humphry Osmond, 86, English psychiatrist and pioneer LSD experimenter.
- Byron George Skelton, 98, American federal judge.

=== 7 ===
- Richard Butler, 17th Viscount Mountgarret, 67, British soldier and aristocrat.
- Safia Farhat, Tunisian artist, academic and women's rights activist.
- Emilia Guiú, 81, Spanish-Mexican actress, liver cancer.
- Mikhail Korkia, 55, Georgian-Soviet basketball player and Olympian (1972 ,1976).
- Raija Siekkinen, 50, Finnish writer.
- Norman Thelwell, 80, English cartoonist.

=== 8 ===
- Walter Freud, 82, Austrian-British Special Operations Executive (SOE) agent during World War II.
- Nicholas Goldschmidt, 95, Canadian conductor, music festival entrepreneur and artistic director.
- Kristian Henriksen, 92, Norwegian football player, coach and Olympian (1936).
- William W. Johnstone, 65, American author.
- Cem Karaca, 58, Turkish singer and composer, heart attack.
- Joe Mallett, 88, English football player.
- Wayne Eyer Manning, 104, American horticulturist and botanist.
- Julius Schwartz, 88, American comic book and pulp magazine editor.

=== 9 ===
- Julio Baylón, 56, Peruvian footballer.
- Robert F. Colesberry, 57, American film and television producer (After Hours, The Wire, Mississippi Burning), complications following cardiac surgery.
- Gerhard Riedmann, 78, Austrian film actor.
- Opilio Rossi, 93, Italian cardinal of the Roman Catholic Church.
- Claude Ryan, 79, Canadian politician, stomach cancer.
- Janusz Żurakowski, 89, Polish fighter and test pilot.

=== 10 ===
- Nils Aas, 70, Norwegian sculptor and illustrator.
- Paul Ilyinsky, 76, American politician and three-time mayor of Palm Beach, Florida.
- Edward Jablonski, 81, American biographer.
- Hub Kittle, 86, American baseball player and manager, complications from kidney failure and diabetes.
- Guy Provost, 78, French Canadian actor, pneumonia.
- John Sundberg, 83, Swedish sport shooter and Olympic medalist (1956, 1964).

=== 11 ===
- Vera Broido, 96, Russian-British writer and a chronicler of the Russian Revolution.
- Tadeusz Dembończyk, 48, Polish weightlifter and Olympic medalist (1980).
- Ryszard Kukliński, 74, Polish colonel, spy and defector, stroke.
- Jozef Lenárt, 80, Slovak politician, member of the Czechoslovak Parliament and Slovak National Council.
- Tony Pope, 56, American voice actor (Metropolis, Spaced Invaders, Who Framed Roger Rabbit), complications following leg surgery.
- Ralph Stewart, 74, Canadian politician, member of the House of Commons of Canada (1968-1979).
- Shirley Strickland, 78, Australian sprinter and Olympic champion (1948, 1952, 1956), heart attack.
- Hitoshi Takagi, 78, Japanese voice actor, arteriosclerotic heart disease.
- Robert E. Thompson, 79, American screenwriter.
- Albeiro Usuriaga, 37, Colombian football player, homicide.

=== 12 ===
- Martin Booth, 59, British author, brain tumor.
- Robert A. Bruce, 87, American cardiologist.
- Martin Jurow, 92, American film producer (Breakfast at Tiffany's, The Pink Panther, The Great Race).
- John Killick, 84, British diplomat.
- Emilio Lecuona, 68, Spanish Olympic gymnast (1960).
- Preston Love, 83, American jazz saxophone player.
- Věra Suchánková, 71, Czech Olympic pair skater (1956).

=== 13 ===
- Carole Eastman, 69, American actress and screenwriter.
- Denis Hurley, 89, South African Roman Catholic prelate, Archbishop of Durban (1946–1992).
- Sarah Jacobson, 32, American film director, screenwriter, and producer, uterine cancer.
- Janusz Kulig, 34, Polish rally driver, railway accident.
- David Lee, 91, British Air Chief Marshal.
- Ted Tappe, 73, American baseball player (Cincinnati Reds, Chicago Cubs).
- François Tavenas, 61, Canadian engineer and academic.
- Zelimkhan Yandarbiyev, 51, Chechen writer, politician and military figurist, explosion.

=== 14 ===
- Sture Baatz, 74, Swedish Olympic rower (1952, 1960).
- Cesáreo Bachiller, 89, Spanish footballer.
- Jock Butterfield, 72, New Zealand rugby player.
- Ruben Carlsson, 91, Swedish Olympic ice hockey player (1936).
- Yang Chengwu, 89, Chinese general and Communist Party politician.
- Lotte Haidegger, 78, Austrian Olympic discus thrower (1948, 1952).
- Elois Jenssen, 81, American film and television costume designer.
- Marco Pantani, 34, Italian racing cyclist, winner of Tour de France and Giro d'Italia in 1998, and Olympian (2000), acute cocaine poisoning.
- Walter Perkins, 72, American jazz drummer, lung cancer.
- Yang Xinhai, 35, Chinese serial killer, execution by firing squad.

=== 15 ===
- Gil Coggins, 75, American jazz pianist.
- Steve Cooper, 39, English football player, intracerebral hemorrhage.
- Bolesław Dubicki, 69, Polish Olympic wrestler (1960, 1964).
- Hasse Ekman, 88, Swedish director, actor, writer and producer for film, stage and television.
- Jens Evensen, 86, Norwegian minister, World Court judge.
- Walter Gottschalk, 85, American mathematician.
- Hermann Hogeback, 89, German bomber pilot during World War II.
- Ed Mieszkowski, 78, American football player (Notre Dame Fighting Irish, Brooklyn Dodgers).
- Jan Miner, 86, American actress.
- Sture Mårtensson, 87, Swedish football player.
- Isarco Ravaioli, 70, Italian film actor.
- Lawrence Ritter, 81, American writer.
- Luigi Taramazzo, 71, Italian racing driver.
- John Tietjen, 75, American Lutheran clergyman, theologian, and national church leader, brain cancer.
- Friedrich Waller, 83, Swiss bobsledder and Olympic champion (1948).

=== 16 ===
- Don Cleverley, 94, New Zealand cricketer.
- Charlie Fox, 82, American baseball manager.
- Ella Johnson, 84, American jazz and rhythm and blues singer, Alzheimer's disease.
- Martin Kneser, 76, German mathematician.
- Harold Smedley, 83, British diplomat.
- Doris Troy, 67, American R&B singer, pulmonary emphysema.
- Geoff Twentyman, 74, English football player.
- Miloslav Šimek, 63, Czech comedian and satirist, leukemia.
- Mary Vandervliet, 91, Canadian Olympic sprinter (1932).

=== 17 ===
- Bruce Beaver, 76, Australian poet and novelist.
- Gaston Godel, 89, Swiss Olympic race walker, silver medalist (1948).
- Sofia Golovkina, 88, Soviet and Russian ballet dancer, choreographer and teacher.
- José López Portillo, 83, Mexican politician and lawyer, President of Mexico.
- Louis von Sonnenberg, 82, Swiss Olympic sports shooter (1960).
- Dragi Stamenković, 83, Yugoslav and Serbian politician and author.
- Cameron Todd Willingham, 36, American convicted murderer, executed by lethal injection.

=== 18 ===
- Despo Diamantidou, 87, Greek actress.
- Tommy Eglington, 81, Irish football player.
- Frankie Evangelista, 69, Filipino newspaper columnist, and radio and television broadcaster, stomach cancer.
- Steve Neal, 54, American journalist (Chicago Sun-Times) and historian, suicide by carbon monoxide poisoning.
- Jean Rouch, 86, French filmmaker and ethnologist, traffic collision.
- Ivor Stanbrook, 80, British Conservative party politician, barrister and Member of Parliament.

=== 19 ===
- Gurgen Margaryan, 25, Armenian Army officer, slashed.
- Franco Ponzinibio, 89, Argentine footballer.
- Archibald Paton Thornton, 83, Canadian historian.
- Verner Toivonen, 95, Finnish Olympic middle-distance runner (1932).
- Renata Vanni, 94, Italian-American film actress.
- Maurice Voron, 75, French rugby league football player.

=== 20 ===
- Minouche Barelli, 56, French singer.
- Fred Brown, 79, British virologist.
- Mary Ferrell, 81, American historian and independent researcher who created a large database on the John F. Kennedy assassination.
- Sigfrido Fontanelli, 56, Italian racing cyclist.
- Mel Hunter, 76, American illustrator, bone cancer.
- J.J. Malone, 68, American blues guitarist, singer and keyboardist.
- Kōyū Ohara, 69, Japanese film director.

=== 21 ===
- Sergey Sergeyevich Averintsev, 66, Russian literary scholar, byzantinist and slavist.
- John Charles, 72, Welsh football player, heart attack.
- Johnny Counts, 64, American football player (New York Giants).
- Néstor de Villa, 75, Filipino musical film actor, prostate cancer.
- Les Gray, 57, British singer (Mud), heart attack during cancer treatment.
- Bart Howard, 88, American composer ("Fly Me To The Moon").
- Svava Jakobsdóttir, 73, Icelandic author and politician.
- Mohd hisraime bin juso, 87, Singaporean banker and hotel owner, heart attack.
- Dan Kiley, 91, American landscape architect.
- Guido Molinari, 70, Canadian abstract artist.
- Custódio Pinto, 62, Portuguese football player.
- Lyudmila Shishova, 63, Soviet Olympic fencer and fencing coach (1960, 1964).

=== 22 ===
- Pat Hintz, 90, American basketball player.
- Roque Máspoli, 86, Uruguayan goalkeeper, heart attack.
- Irina Press, 64, Soviet athlete and Olympic champion (1960, 1964).
- Azriel Rosenfeld, 73, American computer image analysis researcher.
- Andy Seminick, 83, American baseball player (Philadelphia Phillies, Cincinnati Red/Redlegs), cancer.
- Anwar Pasha Turki, 77, Pakistani Olympic boxer (1948, 1952).

=== 23 ===
- Vijay Anand, 71, Indian Bollywood filmmaker and brother of Dev Anand., heart attack.
- Carl Anderson, 58, American actor (Jesus Christ Superstar)), leukemia.
- Neil Ardley, 66, British jazz composer.
- Sikander Bakht, 85, Indian politician, Governor of Kerala.
- Ryszard Białowąs, 56, Polish Olympic basketball player (1972).
- Pedro Bloch, 90, Brazilian writer, respiratory failure.
- Buddy Brown, 78, American football player (Washington Redskins, Green Bay Packers).
- Don Cornell, 84, American singer, emphysema and diabetes.
- Douglas Scott Falconer, 90, British geneticist.
- Samuel Edward Konkin III, 56, Canadian-American philosopher and economist.
- Bob Marshall, 93, Australian billiards player.
- Bob Mayo, 52, American session keyboardist and guitarist, heart attack.

=== 24 ===
- Nino Anderlini, 77, Italian Olympic cross-country skier (1952).
- Albert Axelrod, 83, American foil fencer and Olympic medalist (1952, 1956, 1960, 1964, 1968), heart attack.
- Estelle Axton, 85, American record executive and co-founder of Stax Records.
- Sheila Darcy, 89, American film actress of the 1930s and the 1940s.
- Grete Ittlinger, 81, Austrian Olympic swimmer (1936).
- Carl Liscombe, 89, Canadian ice hockey player (Detroit Red Wings), leukemia.
- Joan McCord, 73, American professor of criminology, lung cancer.
- John Randolph, 88, American actor (Serpico, Prizzi's Honor, You've Got Mail), Tony winner (1987).
- A.C. Reed, 77, American saxophonist, cancer.
- Alvino Rey, 95, American jazz guitarist and bandleader ("Deep in the Heart of Texas"), pneumonia.

=== 25 ===
- Waggoner Carr, 85, American politician, Speaker of the Texas House of Representatives and Attorney General of Texas, cancer.
- Albert Chartier, 91, French-Canadian cartoonist and illustrator.
- Franz Csöngei, 90, Austrian ice hockey player and Olympian (1936, 1948).
- Reza Esteki, 66, Iranian weightlifter and Olympian (1964).
- Jack Flavell, 74, English cricketer.
- Jacques Georges, 87, French football administrator, President of UEFA (1983–1990).
- Henryk Jaźnicki, 86, Polish football player.
- Pe Khin, 91, Burmese diplomat.
- Hans Mikkelsen, 89, Danish Olympic rower (1936).
- Yuri Ozerov, 75, Soviet Olympic basketball player (1952, 1956).
- B. Nagi Reddy, 91, Indian movie producer.
- Ahmed Sefrioui, Moroccan novelist.
- Bagrat Shinkuba, 86, Abkhaz writer, poet, historian, and politician.
- Erkki Tamila, 92, Finnish Olympic long-distance runner (1936).

=== 26 ===
- Harry Bartell, 90, American actor and announcer in radio, television and film.
- Shankarrao Chavan, 83, Indian politician, Chief Minister of Maharashtra.
- Adolf Ehrnrooth, 99, Finnish general, World War II veteran and Olympian equestrian (1948).
- Russell Hunter, 79, Scottish actor, lung cancer.
- Roger Mirams, 85, New Zealand-Australian film producer and director.
- Roy Smith, 59, Canadian racing driver.
- Jack Sperling, 81, American jazz drummer.
- Boris Trajkovski, 47, Macedonian politician, President of the Republic of Macedonia, aviation accident.
- Simon Walker, 46, British historian of late-medieval England, cancer.
- Ralph E. Winters, 94, Canadian film editor.

=== 27 ===
- Yoshihiko Amino, 76, Japanese marxist historian and intellectual, lung cancer.
- Clarence Barber, 86, Canadian economist and academic.
- Dick Leftridge, 59, American football player (West Virginia Mountaineers, Pittsburgh Steelers).
- Francisco Mago Leccia, 72, Venezuelan ichthyologist.
- Enzo Polito, 77, Italian Olympic water polo player (1952).
- Paul Sweezy, 93, American marxian economist and founding editor of the Monthly Review..
- Paul Voell, 68, German Olympic swimmer (1956, 1960).

=== 28 ===
- Daniel J. Boorstin, 89, American social historian, pneumonia.
- Eivor Engelbrektsson, 89, Swedish actress.
- Ruslan Gelayev, 39, Chechen politician, general and resistance commander, K.I.A.
- Angie Turner King, 98, American chemist, mathematician, and educator.
- Stanislaus Lo Kuang, 93, Taiwanese Catholic archbishop.
- Carmen Laforet, 82, Spanish author.
- Marv Matuszak, 72, American gridiron football player.
- Jaroslav Šťastný, 67, Czech Olympic gymnast (1960).
- Nicholas Vivian, 6th Baron Vivian, 68, British soldier and aristocrat.

=== 29 ===
- Oleksandr Beresch, 26, Ukrainian gymnast and Olympian (2000), traffic collision.
- Dana Broccoli, 82, American actress, cancer.
- Marc Cavell, 64, American actor.
- Armando de Ramón, 77, Chilean historian.
- Jane Engelhard, 86, American philanthropist and wife of industrialist Charles W. Engelhard Jr., pneumonia.
- Harold Bernard St. John, 72, Barbadian politician, cancer.
- Kagamisato Kiyoji, 80, Japanese sumo wrestler.
- Lise Koch, 65, Danish handball player, javelin thrower, and Olympian (1960).
- Maurice Larkin, 71, English historian specialising in the history of modern France.
- Jerome Lawrence, 88, American playwright and author, stroke.
- Toni Onley, 75, Canadian painter, plane crash.
- Danny Ortiz, 27, Guatemalan football goalkeeper, torn pericardium.
- William Pearson, 87, British Olympic swimmer (1936).
- Witold Rudziński, 90, Polish composer, conductor, and author.
- Nat Taylor, 98, Canadian inventor and film producer.
