= Bodil Thirstedt =

Danish sprint canoeist

Medal record

Women's canoe sprint

Representing Denmark

World Championships
Gold medal – first place	1948 London	K-2 500 m
Bronze medal – third place	1938 Vaxholm	K-1 600 m
Bronze medal – third place	1938 Vaxholm	K-2 600 m

Bodil Margrethe Thirstedt-Svendsen (born 4 November 1916; date of death unknown) was a Danish sprint canoeist who competed from the late 1930s to the early 1950s. She won three medals at the ICF Canoe Sprint World Championships with a gold (K-2 500 m: 1948) and two bronzes (K-1 600 m, K-2 600 m: both 1938).

Svendsen also competed in the K-1 500 m event at the 1952 Summer Olympics in Helsinki but was eliminated in the heats. Her husband, Axel Svendsen, also competed in the canoeing events at the 1936 Summer Olympics, finishing fourth in the K-2 10000 metres competition and seventh in the K-2 1000 metres event.
