= Gordon Potter =

Gordon Potter may refer to:

- Gordon Potter (canoeist) (1906–1971), Canadian canoeist
- Gordon Potter (cricketer) (born 1931), former English cricketer
