= Sixten Jansson =

Swedish canoeist

Sixten Jansson (12 January 1913 – 8 December 2006) was a Swedish canoeist who competed in the late 1930s.

He finished second originally in the K-2 1000 m final at the 1936 Summer Olympics in Berlin, but was disqualified for bumping into the German boat of Ewald Tilker and Fritz Bondroit.
