= Canoeing at the 1936 Summer Olympics – Men's K-1 10000 metres =

These are the results of the men's K-1 10,000 metres competition in canoeing at the 1936 Summer Olympics. The K-1 event is raced by single-man canoe sprint kayaks and took place on Friday, August 7.

Fifteen canoeists from 15 nations competed.

== Medalists ==
Gold	Silver	Bronze
Ernst Krebs (GER)	Fritz Landertinger (AUT)	Ernest Riedel (USA)

== Final ==
Friday, August 7, 1936: Only a final was held.

Place	Canoeist	Time
1	Ernst Krebs (GER)	46:01.6
2	Fritz Landertinger (AUT)	46:14.7
3	Ernest Riedel (USA)	47:23.9
4	Ko van Tongeren (NED)	47:31.0
5	Evert Johansson (FIN)	47:35.5
6	František Brzák (TCH)	47:36.8
7	Bruno Lips (SUI)	48:01.2
8	Elio Sasso Sant (ITA)	49:20.0
9	Nils Wallin (SWE)	49:48.7
10	Josip Zidarn (YUG)	50:31.6
11	Louis Maes (BEL)	51:31.8
12	Péter Szittya (HUN)	52:16.8
13	Jules Mackowiak (FRA)	52:56.0
14	William Williamson (CAN)	54:05.7
15	Helge Nielsen (DEN)	56:43.9
