= Kainz =

Kainz (variants: Kaincz, Kaintz, Kainzl) is an Austrian and German surname. Notable people with the surname include:

- Florian Kainz (born 1992), Austrian football midfielder
- Howard P. Kainz (born 1933), American professor emeritus
- Tobias Kainz (born 1992), Austrian footballer
- Adolf Kainz (1903–1948), Austrian canoeist
- Josef Kainz (1858–1910), Austrian actor
- Wolfgang Kainz (born 1967), Austrian scientist
