= Stanley Potter =

Stanley Potter may refer to:

- Stanley Potter (canoeist) (1915–1962), Canadian Olympic canoeist
- Stanley Potter (sailor) (1914–1978), British Olympic sailor
