= 1967 European Women's Artistic Gymnastics Championships =

6th European Women's Artistic Gymnastics Championships
- Location: Amsterdam, Netherlands
- Dates: 25–27 May 1967

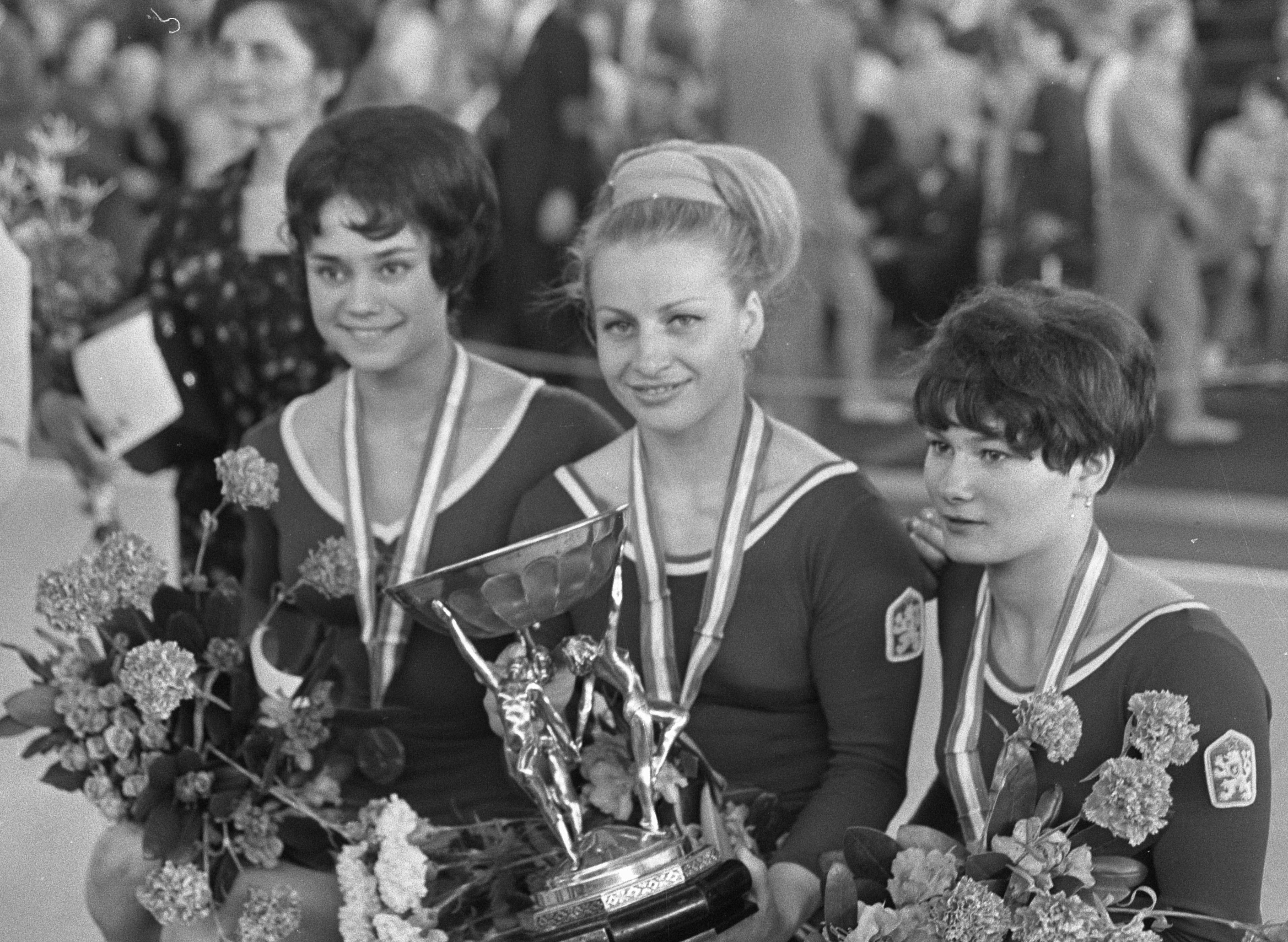
The all-around medalists: Voronina, Čáslavská, and Krajčírová

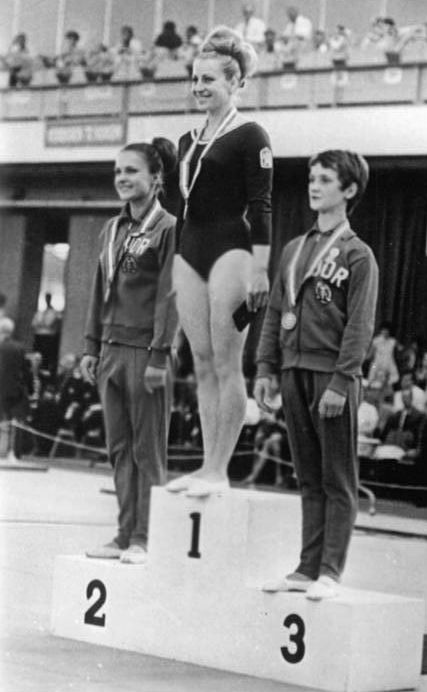
The vault medalists: Zuchold, Čáslavská, and Janz

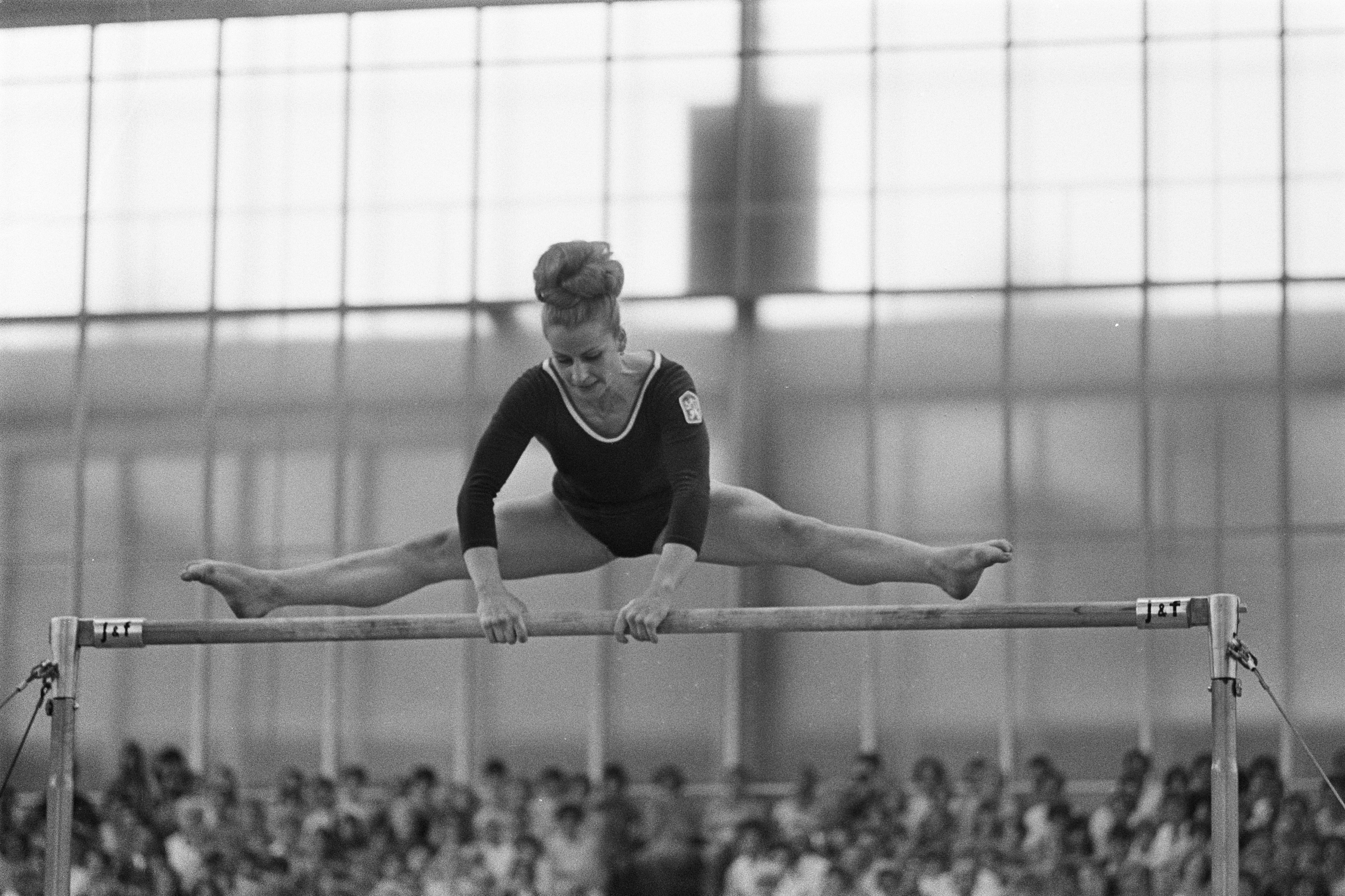
Čáslavská on uneven bars

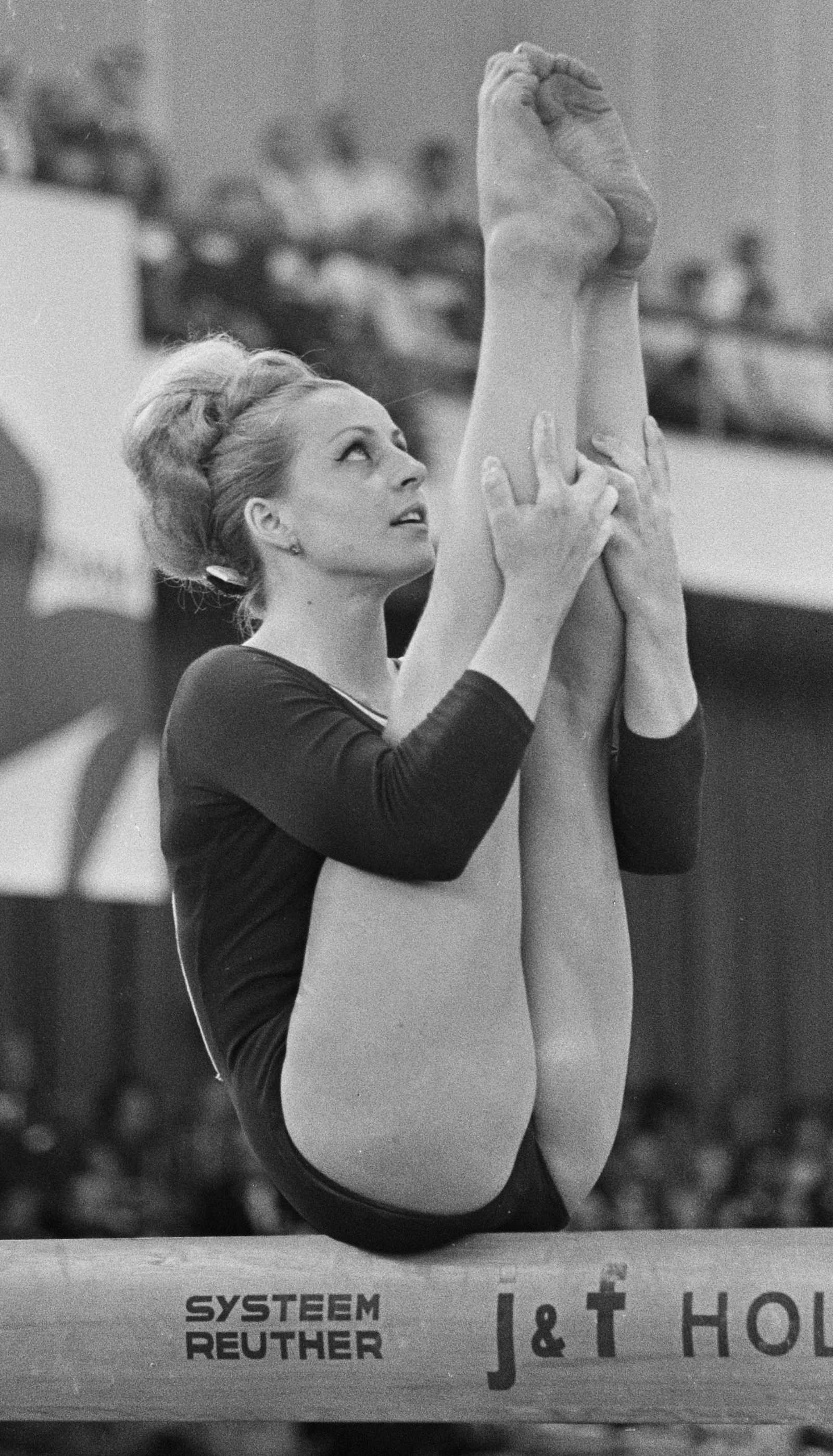
Čáslavská on balance beam

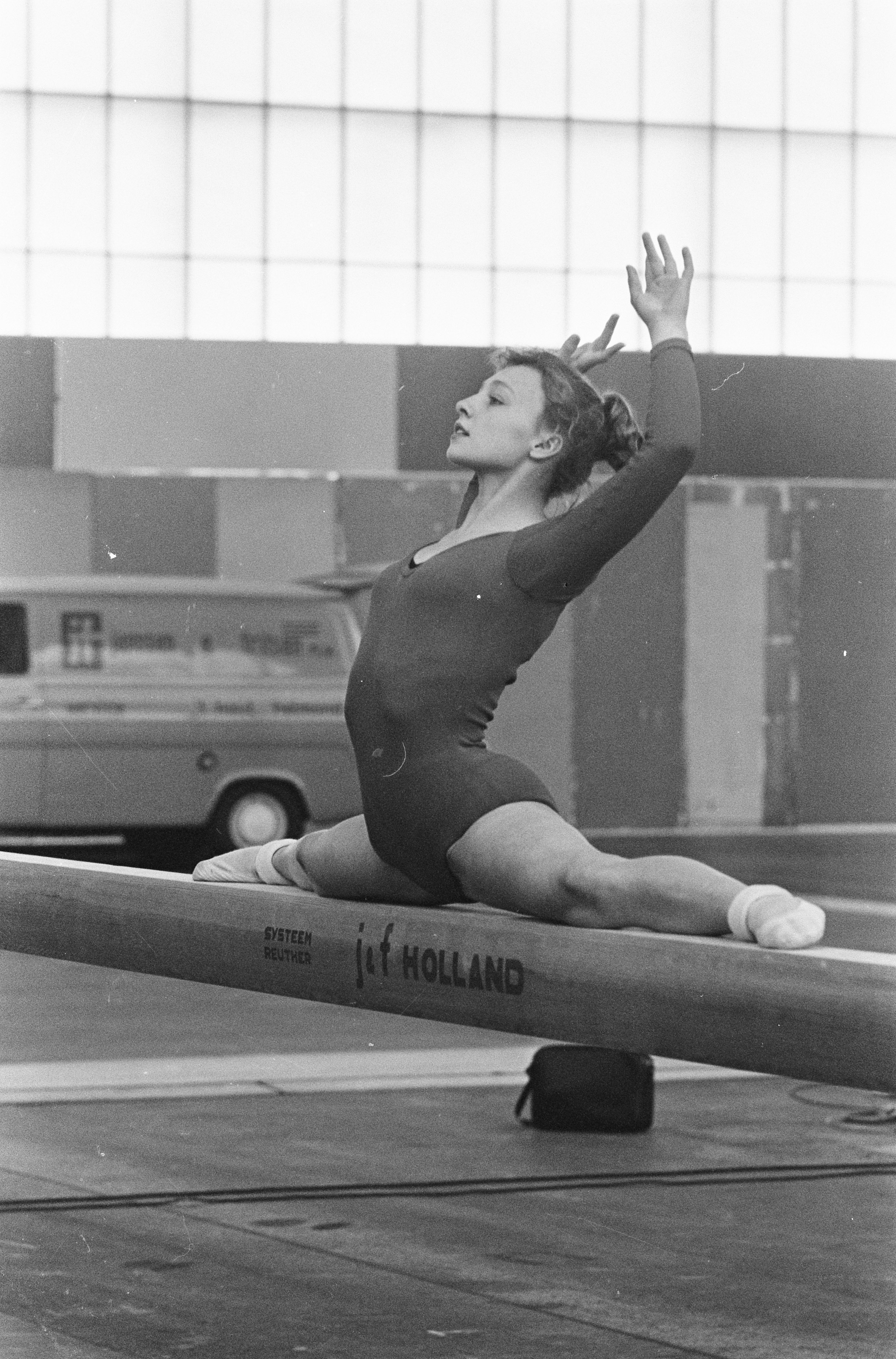
Kuchinskaya on balance beam

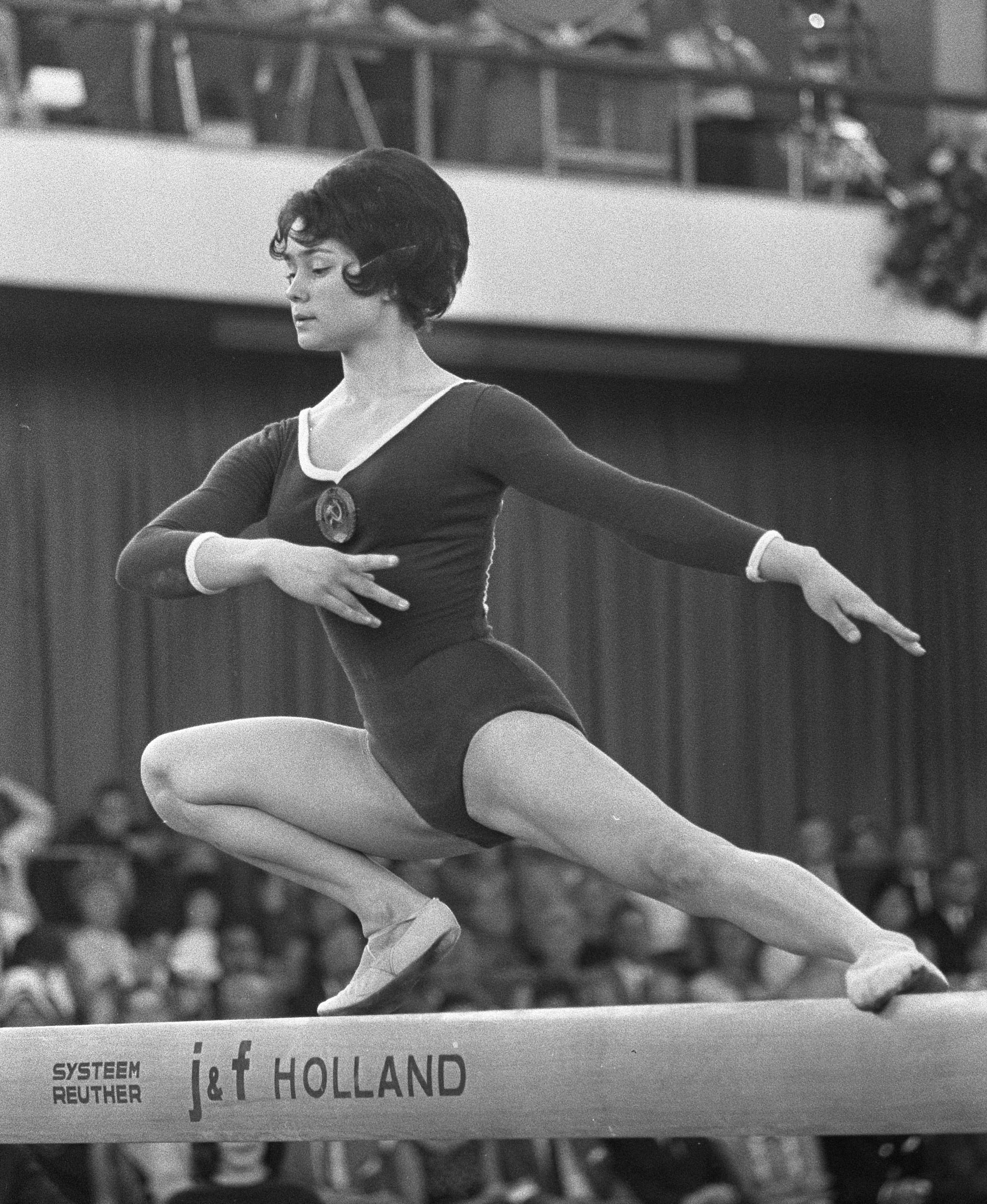
Voronina on balance beam

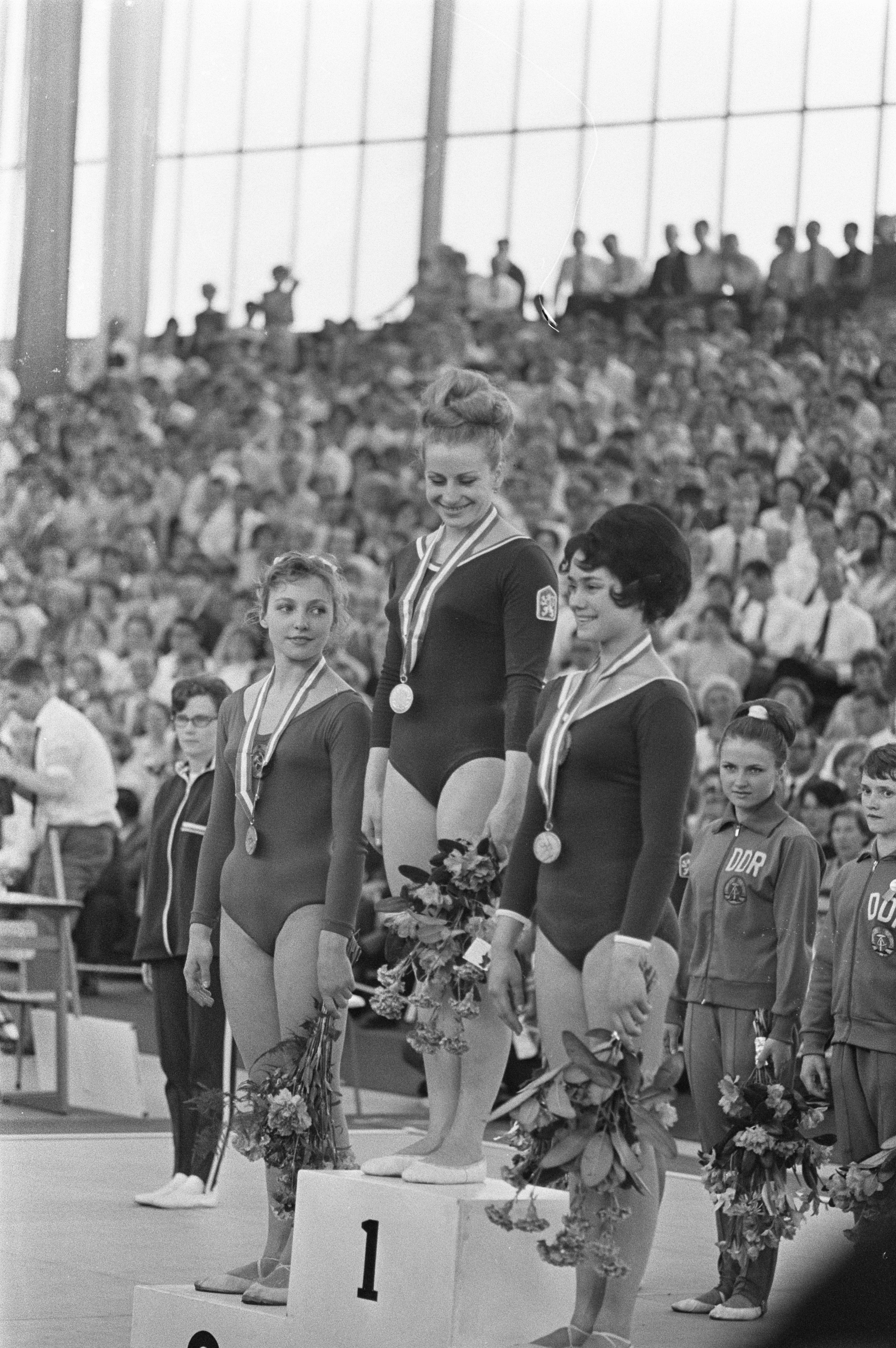
The balance beam and floor medalists: Kuchinskaya, Čáslavská, and Voronina

The 1967 European Women's Artistic Gymnastics Championships were held in Amsterdam from May 25–27, 1967.

== Medalists ==
Event	Gold	Silver	Bronze
Seniors
All-around	Věra Čáslavská (TCH)	Zinaida Voronina (URS)	Marianna Krajčírová (TCH)
Vault	Věra Čáslavská (TCH)	Erika Zuchold (GDR)	Karin Janz (GDR)
Uneven bars	Věra Čáslavská (TCH)	Karin Janz (GDR)	Marianna Krajčírová (TCH)
Balance beam	Věra Čáslavská (TCH)	Natalia Kuchinskaya (URS)	Zinaida Voronina (URS)
Floor	Věra Čáslavská (TCH)	Natalia Kuchinskaya (URS)	Zinaida Voronina (URS)

== Results ==
=== All-around ===
Rank	Gymnast	Vault (gymnastics)	Uneven bars	Balance beam	Floor (gymnastics)	Total
1st place, gold medalist(s)	Věra Čáslavská (TCH)	9.833	9.433	9.833	9.866	38.965
2nd place, silver medalist(s)	Zinaida Voronina (URS)	9.500	9.500	9.733	9.800	38.533
3rd place, bronze medalist(s)	Marianna Krajčírová (TCH)	9.600	9.433	9.566	9.600	38.199
4	Karin Janz (GDR)	9.533	9.433	9.733	9.366	38.065
5	Erika Zuchold (GDR)	9.700	9.166	9.666	9.366	37.898
6	Margit Oroszi (HUN)	9.333	9.400	9.566	9.266	37.565
7	Evelyne Letourneur (FRA)	9.333	9.100	9.533	9.400	37.366
8	Mariya Karashka (BUL)	9.200	9.300	9.233	9.400	37.133
9	Natalia Kuchinskaya (URS)	9.600	7.766	9.766	9.833	36.965
10	Ágnes Bánfai (HUN)	9.233	9.400	9.433	8.600	36.666
11	Marie Lundquist (SWE)	9.100	8.866	9.200	9.300	36.466
12	Nicole Bourdiau (FRA)	8.866	9.066	9.200	9.233	36.365
13	Anastasia Mitova (BUL)	8.933	8.866	9.266	9.266	36.331
14	Margot Klees (NED)	9.066	9.033	9.066	9.133	36.298
15	Adriana Biagotti (ITA)	8.833	9.200	9.200	8.933	36.266
16	Nataša Šljepica (YUG)	9.066	9.066	8.900	9.200	36.232
17	Elena Ceampelea (ROU)	9.066	9.266	8.100	9.500	35.932
18	Halina Daniec (POL)	8.933	9.300	9.233	8.400	35.866
19	Rozalia Filipescu (ROU)	8.700	8.933	8.766	9.433	35.832

=== Vault ===
Rank	Gymnast	Score
1st place, gold medalist(s)	Věra Čáslavská (TCH)	19.733
2nd place, silver medalist(s)	Erika Zuchold (GDR)	19.533
3rd place, bronze medalist(s)	Karin Janz (GDR)	19.333
4	Marianna Krajčírová (TCH)	19.233
5	Natalia Kuchinskaya (URS)	19.200
5	Zinaida Voronina (URS)	19.200

=== Uneven bars ===
Rank	Gymnast	Score
1st place, gold medalist(s)	Věra Čáslavská (TCH)	19.199
2nd place, silver medalist(s)	Erika Zuchold (GDR)	19.166
3rd place, bronze medalist(s)	Marianna Krajčírová (TCH)	19.066
4	Zinaida Voronina (URS)	18.966
5	Margit Oroszi (HUN)	18.933
6	Ágnes Bánfai (HUN)	18.900

=== Balance beam ===
Rank	Gymnast	Score
1st place, gold medalist(s)	Věra Čáslavská (TCH)	19.833
2nd place, silver medalist(s)	Natalia Kuchinskaya (URS)	19.666
3rd place, bronze medalist(s)	Zinaida Voronina (URS)	19.499
4	Karin Janz (GDR)	19.466
5	Marianna Krajčírová (TCH)	19.132
6	Erika Zuchold (GDR)	19.099

=== Floor ===
Rank	Gymnast	Score
1st place, gold medalist(s)	Věra Čáslavská (TCH)	19.866
2nd place, silver medalist(s)	Natalia Kuchinskaya (URS)	19.733
3rd place, bronze medalist(s)	Zinaida Voronina (URS)	19.666
4	Marianna Krajčírová (TCH)	19.366
5	Rozalia Filipescu (ROU)	19.166
6	Elena Ceampelea (ROU)	19.033
