= Landertinger =

Landertinger is a surname. Notable people with the surname include:

- Dominik Landertinger (born 1988), Austrian biathlete
- Fritz Landertinger (1914–1943), Austrian canoeist
