= Alfons Dorfner =

Austrian Olympic canoeist

Olympic medal record

Men's flatwater canoeing
Gold medal – first place	1936 Berlin	K-2 1000 m

Alfons Dorfner (Lembach im Mühlkreis,27 January 1911 – Linz, 22 January 1982) was an Austrian canoeist who competed in the 1936 Summer Olympics.

He was born in Lembach im Mühlkreis.

In 1936 he won the gold medal in the K-2 1000 metre competition with his partner Adolf Kainz. They also competed in the folding K-2 10000 metre event and finished fourth.
