= Canoeing at the 1936 Summer Olympics – Men's folding K-1 10000 metres =

These are the results of the men's folding K-1 10000 metres competition in canoeing at the 1936 Summer Olympics. The K-1 event is raced by single-man canoe sprint folding kayaks and took place on Friday, August 7.

Thirteen canoeists from 13 nations competed. The 1936 Games was the only time when the folding K-1 10000 metres competition was part of the canoeing program.

== Medalists ==
Gold	Silver	Bronze
Gregor Hradetzky (AUT)	Henri Eberhardt (FRA)	Xaver Hörmann (GER)

== Final ==
Friday, August 7: Only a final was held.

Place	Canoeist	Time
1	Gregor Hradetzky (AUT)	50:01.2
2	Henri Eberhardt (FRA)	50:04.2
3	Xaver Hörmann (GER)	50:06.5
4	Lennart Dozzi (SWE)	51:23.8
5	František Svoboda (TCH)	51:52.5
6	Hans Mooser (SUI)	52:43.8
7	Frans Nordberg (FIN)	52:45.8
8	George Lawton (GBR)	52:50.0
9	Jan Vrolijk (NED)	54:05.9
10	Burr Folks (USA)	55:32.1
11	Mirko Vincens (YUG)	55:41.5
12	Joé Treinen (LUX)	57:14.8
13	Jules Deneumoulin (BEL)	58:20.1
