= Van Tongeren =

van Tongeren is a surname of Dutch origin. People with the name include:

- Hans van Tongeren (1955–1982), Dutch film actor
- Jack van Tongeren (born 1947), Australian white supremacist and right-wing activist
- Jacoba van Tongeren (1903–1967), Dutch resistance fighter
- Jelle van Tongeren (born 1980), Dutch jazz violin virtuoso
- John Van Tongeren (contemporary), film and television music composer
- Ko van Tongeren (1913–1996), Dutch Olympic canoeist
