= Canoeing at the 1936 Summer Olympics – Men's K-1 1000 metres =

These are the results of the men's K-1 1000 metres competition in canoeing at the 1936 Summer Olympics. The K-1 event is raced by single-man canoe sprint kayaks. The heats and the final took place on Saturday, August 8.

Fifteen canoeists from 15 nations competed.

== Medalists ==
Gold	Silver	Bronze
Gregor Hradetzky (AUT)	Helmut Cämmerer (GER)	Jaap Kraaier (NED)

== Heats ==
The 15 competitors first raced in two heats. The top four finishers in both heats moved directly to the final.

Heat 1

Place	Canoeist	Time	Qual.
1	Jaap Kraaier (NED)	4:36.5	QF
2	Joel Ramqvist (SWE)	4:38.8	QF
3	Henri Eberhardt (FRA)	4:41.1	QF
4	Ivar Iversen (NOR)	4:44.3	QF
5	Elio Sasso Sant (ITA)	4:50.2	
6	Hans Potthof (SUI)	4:50.9	
7	Emil Šmatlák (TCH)	4:54.1	
8	Péter Szittya (HUN)	5:08.7	

Heat 2

Place	Canoeist	Time	Qual.
1	Gregor Hradetzky (AUT)	4:25.2	QF
2	Helmut Cämmerer (GER)	4:27.2	QF
3	Ernest Riedel (USA)	4:40.8	QF
4	Birger Johansson (FIN)	4:47.0	QF
5	Henri Honsia (BEL)	4:51.1	
6	Poul Larsen (DEN)	4:56.0	
7	Frank Amyot (CAN)	5:17.0	

== Final ==
Place	Canoeist	Time
1	Gregor Hradetzky (AUT)	4:22.9
2	Helmut Cämmerer (GER)	4:25.6
3	Jaap Kraaier (NED)	4:35.1
4	Ernest Riedel (USA)	4:38.1
5	Joel Ramqvist (SWE)	4:39.5
6	Henri Eberhardt (FRA)	4:41.2
7	Birger Johansson (FIN)	4:42.2
8	Ivar Iversen (NOR)	4:44.2

The final took place in a heavy downpour that included thunder and lightning.
