= Nordberg (surname) =

Nordberg is a surname. Notable people with the surname include:

- Anders Nordberg (born 1978), Norwegian orienteering competitor
- Bruno V. Nordberg (1857–1924), founder of Nordberg Manufacturing Company
- Dan Nordberg, American politician
- Erkki Nordberg(1946–2012), Finnish colonel
- Frans Nordberg (1900–1984), Finnish canoer
- Jenny Nordberg, New York-based, Swedish journalist
- John Albert Nordberg (1926–2021), United States federal judge
- Jöran Nordberg (1677–1744), Swedish historian
- Lars Nordberg (born 1982), Norwegian handball player
- Nils Nordberg (born 1942), Norwegian crime writer, anthology editor and audio play director
- Terje Nordberg (born 1949), Norwegian comics artist, comics writer and magazine editor

== See also ==
- Nordberg, neighbourhood in Nordre Aker in Oslo
- Nordberg Manufacturing Company
- Nordberg (station), station on the Sognsvann Line of the Oslo Metro in Oslo, Norway
