= Gunnar Lundqvist =

Swedish canoeist

Gunnar Lundqvist (31 October 1915 – 15 March 2001) was a Swedish canoeist who competed in the late 1930s.

He finished second originally in the K-2 1000 m final at the 1936 Summer Olympics in Berlin, but was disqualified for bumping into the German boat of Ewald Tilker and Fritz Bondroit.
