= Ernst Krebs (canoeist) =

German sprint canoeist

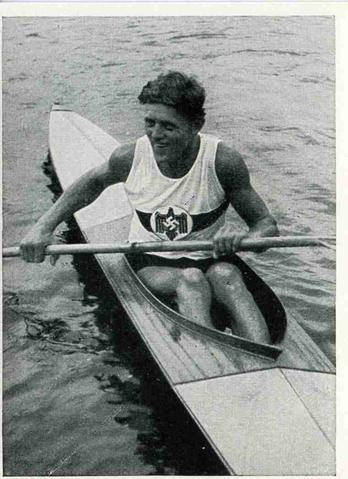
- Krebs near the finish line, 1936 Olympics

Medal record

Men's canoe sprint

Representing Germany

Olympic Games
Gold medal – first place	1936 Berlin	K-1 10000 m

Ernst Krebs (4 November 1906 – 20 July 1970) was a German sprint canoeist, born in Munich. At the 1936 Summer Olympics, he won the gold medal in the K-1 10000 m event. This event took place on Friday 7 August 1936, at 5:10 pm. In total including himself, there were 15 participants representing 15 countries for the one-seater kayak race. Krebs won gold with a time of 46:01.6. The silver medal went to Fritz Landertinger, of Austria, with a time of 46.14.7 and the bronze medal went to Ernst Riedel, of the U.S.A., with a time of 47.23.9. The electric timing apparatus of the firm of Lòbner was used for time-keeping and there were four timekeepers at the finish line.

Prior to and during his canoeing career, he was a competitive cross-country skier and won four German titles with the Bavarian 4x10 km relay at the Nordic Championships from 1928-1932. At the 1929 FIS Nordic World Ski Championships, Krebs came eighth in an 18 km race. He was affiliated with the Kanu-Club der Turngemeinde München. In 1933, he won the European flatwater canoeing title in the K-1 over 10 km at the Canoe Sprint European Championships. He later qualified for the 1936 Olympics.

Krebs was also a mountaineer and would often go to the Alps with Toni Schmid (who had the second successful climb up the Matterhorn, alongside his brother Franz, in 1931). In 1932, Krebs survived a significant fall at the Großes Wiesbachhorn whilst climbing, which killed Toni Schmid.

After his career in sports, he became a tinsmith. He died at age 63 in Gauting, Germany after an accident, where he fell off a ladder whilst installing a gutter to the third floor of a house.
