= Charles Brahm =

Belgian canoeist (1917–2003)

Charles Brahm (Newcastle upon Tyne, 25 July 1917 – Wilrijk, 26 May 2003) was a Belgian canoeist who competed in the 1936 Summer Olympics. In 1936 he and his partner Clement Spiette finished ninth in the K-2 10000 m event.
