= Helge Nielsen =

Danish canoeist

Helge Nielsen (March 23, 1917 – September 12, 1981) was a Danish canoeist who competed in the 1936 Summer Olympics.

In 1936 he finished 15th and last in the K-1 10000 m event.
