= Edward Deir =

Canadian canoeist

Edward J. Deir (February 21, 1915 – March 20, 1990) was a Canadian canoeist who competed in the 1936 Summer Olympics.

In 1936 he and his partner Frank Willis finished sixth in the K-2 1000 m event. Deir also competed with his partner Gordon Potter in the K-2 10000 m event where they finished tenth.
