= Mirko Vincens =

Yugoslav canoeist

Mirko Vinces (January 11, 1914 – July 17, 1944) was a Yugoslav sprint canoeist who competed in the late 1930s.

He finished 11th in the folding K-1 10000 m event at the 1936 Summer Olympics in Berlin.
