= Sándor Gelle =

Hungarian canoeist (1914–1970)

Sándor Gelle (19 February 1914 – 1 May 1970) was a Hungarian sprint canoeist who competed in the late 1930s.

At the 1936 Summer Olympics in Berlin, he finished 12th in the K-2 10000 m event while being eliminated in the heats of the K-2 1000 m event.
