= Birger Johansson =

Finnish canoeist (1910–1940)

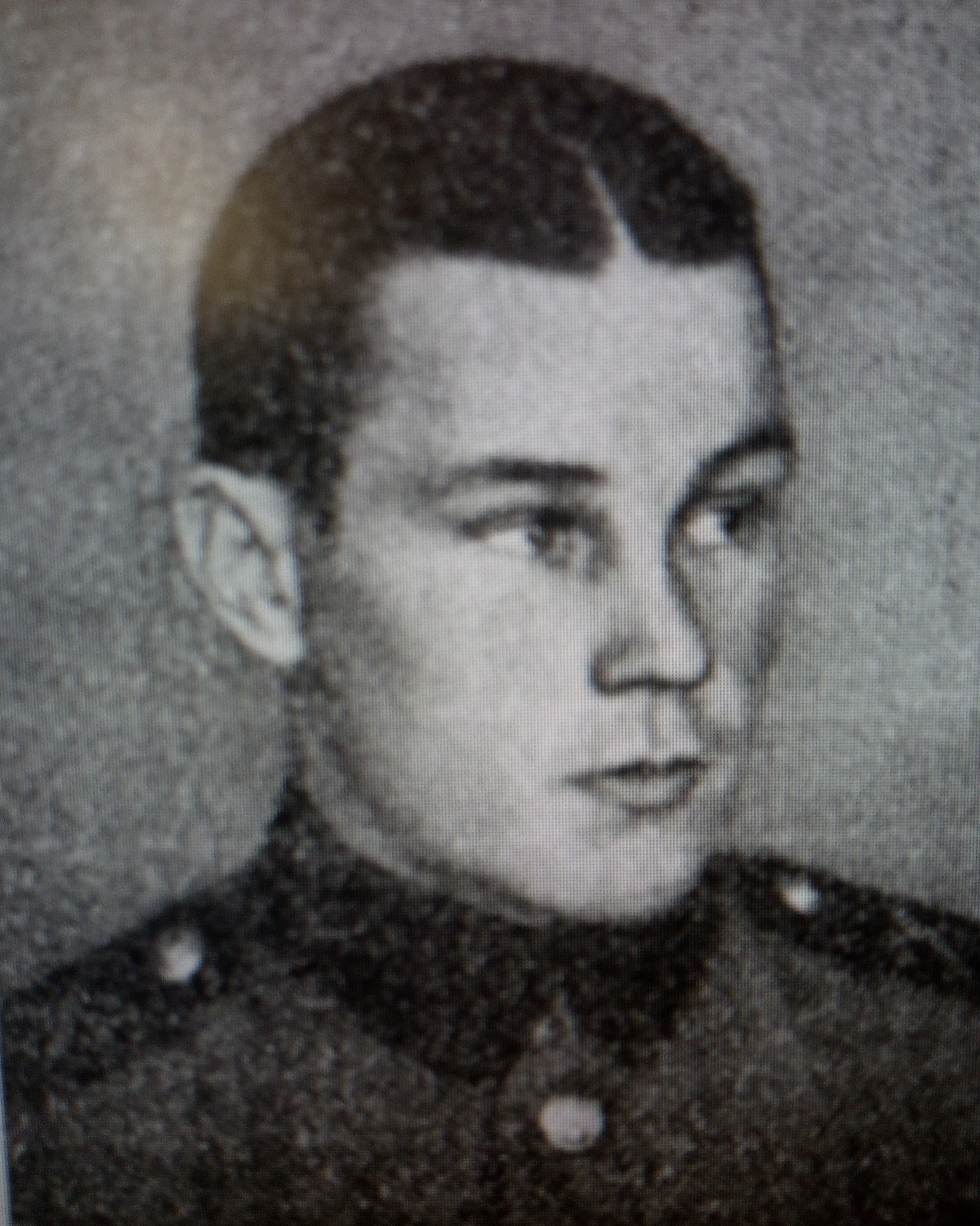
Birger Johansson

Max Birger Johansson (20 September 1910 – 4 January 1940) was a Finnish canoeist who competed in the 1936 Summer Olympics. In 1936 he finished seventh in the K-1 1000 metre competition.

He was killed in action during World War II.
