= Marian Kozłowski (canoeist) =

Polish canoeist

Marian Kozłowski (6 June 1915 in Poznań – 1943 in Germany) was a Polish sprint canoeist who competed in the late 1930s. He finished 11th in the K-2 10000 m event at the 1936 Summer Olympics in Berlin.

During the German occupation of Poland he was sent to a forced labor in Germany. He died there in 1943 during Allied bombing.
