= Frank Willis (canoeist) =

Canadian canoeist

Francis Martin Willis (October 13, 1915 – November 2, 1991) was a Canadian canoeist who competed in the 1936 Summer Olympics.

He died in Kingston, Ontario.

In 1936 he and his partner Edward Deir finished sixth in the K-2 1000 m event. Willis also competed with his partner Stanley Potter in the folding K-2 10000 m event where they finished tenth.
