= Frans De Blaes =

Belgian canoeist

Frans De Blaes (17 September 1909 – 27 February 2010) was a Belgian sprint canoeist who competed in the late 1930s. He competed in the K-2 1000 m at the 1936 Summer Olympics in Berlin, but eliminated in the heats. At the time of his death he was Belgium's oldest living Olympic competitor.
