= Canoeing at the 1936 Summer Olympics – Men's K-2 1000 metres =

These are the results of the men's K-2 1000 metres competition in canoeing at the 1936 Summer Olympics. The K-2 event is raced by two-man canoe sprint kayaks. Heats and final took place on Saturday, August 8.

Twenty-four canoeists from twelve nations competed.

== Medalists ==
| Gold | Silver | Bronze |
|---|---|---|
| Adolf Kainz and Alfons Dorfner (AUT) | Ewald Tilker and Fritz Bondroit (GER) | Nicolaas Tates and Wim van der Kroft (NED) |

== Results ==
=== Heats ===
The 12 teams first raced in two heats. The top four teams in each heat advanced directly to the final.

Heat 1

| Place | Canoeist | Time | Qual. |
|---|---|---|---|
| 1 | Adolf Kainz and Alfons Dorfner (AUT) | 4:10.0 | QF |
| 2 | Nicolaas Tates and Wim van der Kroft (NED) | 4:22.2 | QF |
| 3 | František Brzák and Josef Dusil (TCH) | 4:22.7 | QF |
| 4 | Verner Løvgreen and Axel Svendsen (DEN) | 4:24.8 | QF |
| 5 | Ernest Riedel and Burr Folks (USA) | 4:24.8 | |
| 6 | René Lacelle and Jules Mackowiak (FRA) | 4:34.6 | |

Heat 2

| Place | Canoeist | Time | Qual. |
|---|---|---|---|
| 1 | Sixten Jansson and Gunnar Lundqvist (SWE) | 4:11.8 | QF |
| 2 | Ewald Tilker and Fritz Bondroit (GER) | 4:11.0 | QF |
| 3 | Rudolf Vilim and Werner Klingelfuss (SUI) | 4:30.8 | QF |
| 4 | Edward Deir and Frank Willis (CAN) | 4:32.0 | QF |
| 5 | Frans De Blaes and Albert Joris (BEL) | 4:42.1 | |
| 6 | Gábor Cseh and Sándor Gelle (HUN) | 4:50.7 | |

=== Final ===
| Place | Canoeist | Time |
|---|---|---|
| 1 | Adolf Kainz and Alfons Dorfner (AUT) | 4:03.8 |
| 2 | Ewald Tilker and Fritz Bondroit (GER) | 4:08.9 |
| 3 | Nicolaas Tates and Wim van der Kroft (NED) | 4:12.2 |
| 4 | František Brzák and Josef Dusil (TCH) | 4:15.2 |
| 5 | Rudolf Vilim and Werner Klingelfuss (SUI) | 4:22.8 |
| 6 | Edward Deir and Frank Willis (CAN) | 4:24.5 |
| 7 | Verner Løvgreen and Axel Svendsen (DEN) | 4:26.6 |
| — | Sixten Jansson and Gunnar Lundqvist (SWE) | DSQ |

Jannson and Lundqvist originally finished second, but were disqualified for bumping into Tilker and Bondroit.
