= Evert Johansson =

Finnish canoeist (1903–1990)

Evert Vilhelm Johansson (9 September 1903 – 2 May 1990) was a Finnish canoeist who competed in the 1936 Summer Olympics.

He was born and died in Porvoon maalaiskunta, Eastern Uusimaa.

In 1936 he finished fifth in the K-1 10000 metre competition.
