= Burr Folks =

American canoeist

Burr Folks (June 27, 1915 – January 9, 2000) was an American canoeist who competed in the 1936 Summer Olympics.

He was born in Schenectady, New York and died in Hasbrouck Heights, New Jersey.

In 1936 he finished tenth in the folding K-1 10000 m event while being eliminated in the heats of the K-2 1000 m event.
