= Othmar Bach =

Swiss canoeist

Othmar Bach (born September 14, 1914, date of death unknown) was a Swiss canoeist who competed in the 1936 Summer Olympics. In 1936 he and his partner Werner Zimmermann finished sixth in the K-2 10000 metres competition.
