= Jules Deneumoulin =

Belgian canoeist

Jules Deneumoulin (Liège, 11 May 1910 – Bouillon, 25 November 2006) was a Belgian sprint canoeist who competed in the late 1930s.

He finished 13th and last in the folding K-1 10000 m event at the 1936 Summer Olympics in Berlin.
