= Albert Joris =

Belgian canoeist (born 1915)

Albert Joris (17 June 1915 – 17 February 1986) was a Belgian sprint canoeist who competed in the late 1930s. He was born in Charroux and died in Jette. Joris competed in the K-2 1000 m at the 1936 Summer Olympics in Berlin, and was eliminated in the heats.
