= Henk Starreveld =

Dutch canoeist

Hendrik "Henk" Pieter Starreveld (28 April 1914 – 8 August 2008) was a Dutch canoeist who competed in the 1936 Summer Olympics.

He was born in Amsterdam.

In 1936 he and his partner Gerardus Siderius finished fifth in the K-2 10000 metres competition.
