= Clement Spiette =

Belgian canoeist

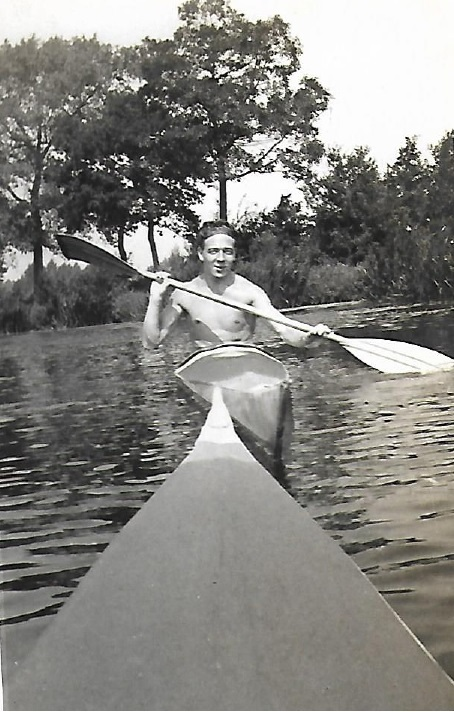
Clement Spiette training for the Olympic games of 1936 in Nazi Germany (Berlin).

Clement E. G. Spiette (24 September 1916 – 21 November 1989) was a Belgian canoeist who competed in the 1936 Summer Olympics. In 1936 he and his partner Charles Brahm finished ninth in the K-2 10000 m event. He was born in Romford and died in Deurne. Louis Spiette and Joanna Janssens (Clement's parents) left Belgium during the first World War. They went to England where Clement was born in 1916 during World War I. After the war he returned; in 1945 his first child was born in Belgium.

== Championships ==
Championship Belgium	1936	1000M & 10000M	1st place
Championship Belgium	1937	10000M	1st place
Championship Belgium	1938	10000M	1st place

Antwerpen -> St-Amands 31Km.	15 May 1938	2u 21m 17sec.
