= František Svoboda (canoeist) =

Czechoslovak canoeist

František Svoboda (24 January 1904 – 21 January 1991) was a Czechoslovak canoeist born in Prague who competed in the 1936 Summer Olympics.

Svoboda was born in Prague in January 1904. In 1936 he finished fifth in the folding K-1 10000 m event. He died in Prague on 21 January 1991, at the age of 86.
