= Antoni Bazaniak =

Polish canoeist

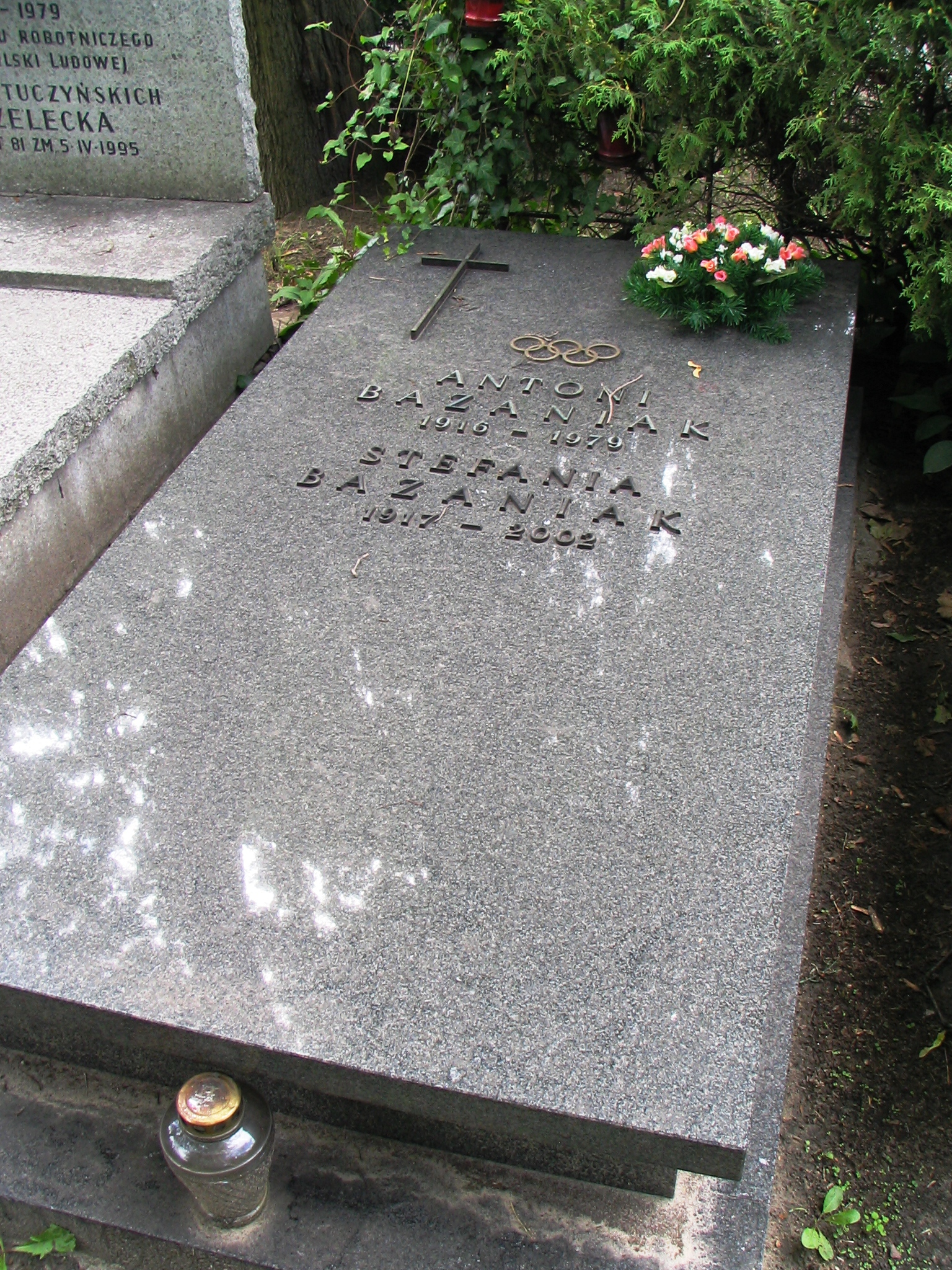
Grave of Antoni Bazaniak at Military Powązki Cemetery in Warsaw

Antoni Bazaniak (1 May 1916 in Hamborn, Germany – 12 March 1979 in Marino, Italy) was a Polish sprint canoeist who competed in the 1930s.

He finished 11h in the K-2 10000 m event at the 1936 Summer Olympics in Berlin.
