= Natalia Kuchinskaya =

Soviet gymnast

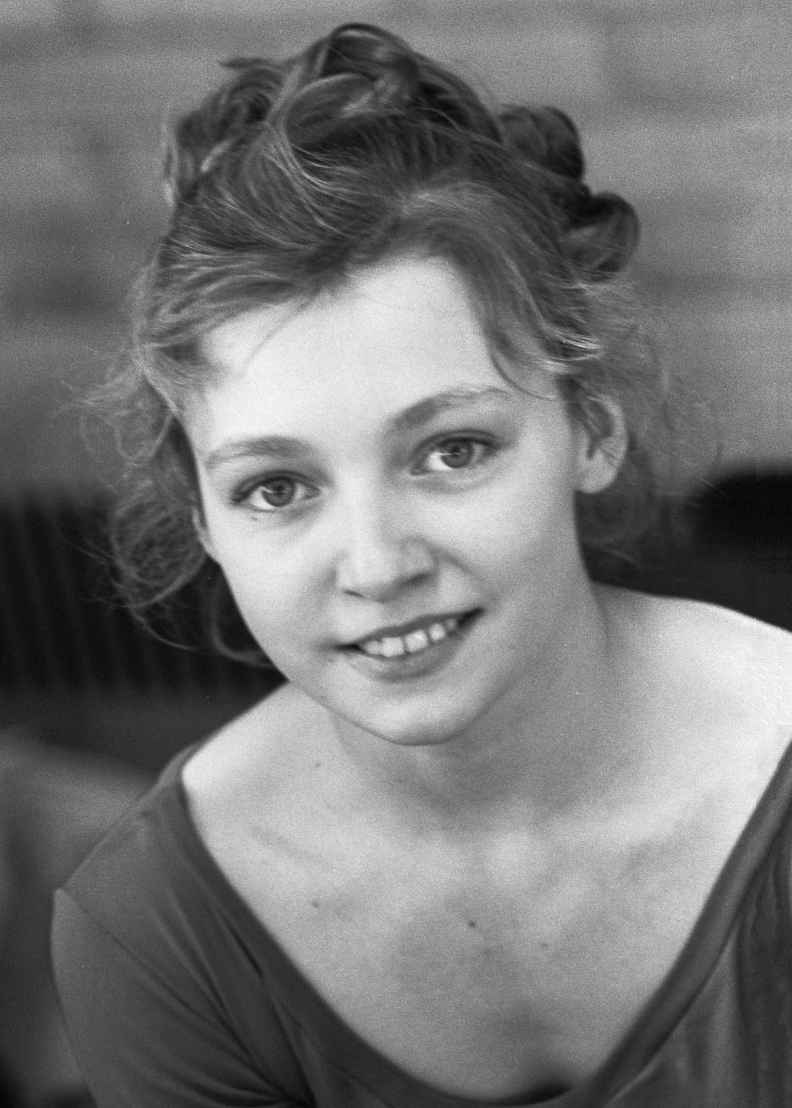
- Natalia Kuchinskaya in 1967

Personal information
- Full name: Natalia Alexandrovna Kuchinskaya
- Nickname: Natasha
- Born: March 8, 1949 (age 77) Leningrad, Russian SFSR, Soviet Union
- Height: 1.58 m (5 ft 2 in)

Gymnastics career
- Discipline: Women's artistic gymnastics
- Gym: Round Lake national training center
- Former coaches: Vladimir Reyson, Larisa Latynina
- Retired: 1968
Medal record
Representing Soviet Union
Olympic Games
Gold medal – first place	1968 Mexico City	Team
Gold medal – first place	1968 Mexico City	Balance beam
Bronze medal – third place	1968 Mexico City	All-around
Bronze medal – third place	1968 Mexico City	Floor exercise
World Championships
Gold medal – first place	1966 Dortmund	Uneven Bars
Gold medal – first place	1966 Dortmund	Balance Beam
Gold medal – first place	1966 Dortmund	Floor Exercise
Silver medal – second place	1966 Dortmund	Team
Silver medal – second place	1966 Dortmund	All-Around
Bronze medal – third place	1966 Dortmund	Vault
European Championships
Silver medal – second place	1967 Amsterdam	Balance Beam
Silver medal – second place	1967 Amsterdam	Floor Exercise

Natalia Alexandrovna Kuchinskaya (Russian: Наталья Александровна Кучинская; alternative transliteration Natal'ja Alieksandrovna Kutchinskaja), also known as Natasha Kuchinskaya (Russian: Наташа Кучинская) (born 8 March 1949) is a retired Russian Olympic gymnast. She won four medals at the 1968 Summer Olympics.

== Gymnastics career ==
Kuchinskaya was born on March 8, 1949, in Leningrad and was selected for a gymnastics class while still in kindergarten. She originally aspired to become a ballet dancer, but was convinced to study gymnastics by her parents, who were both involved with the sport. She trained with Vladimir Reyson and later national team coach Larisa Latynina, who was said to consider Kuchinskaya one of her favourite gymnasts.

By 1965, at age 16, Kuchinskaya was the USSR national champion. At the 1966 World Championships, after winning her second Nationals title, the USSR Cup and the World Trials, she established herself as one of the stars of the Soviet team, winning gold medals in three of the four event finals (balance beam, uneven bars and floor exercise), a bronze on vault, and silvers in the all-around and team events. Kuchinskaya continued her winning streak in 1967, when she won the pre-Olympic test event in Mexico City and swept the USSR Nationals, walking away with the all-around title and every single event final gold medal.

At the 1968 Olympics, Kuchinskaya was arguably the most popular member of the Soviet team. She placed third in the all-around, behind Věra Čáslavská and her teammate Zinaida Voronina; she also shared the team gold medal and won the balance beam title and a bronze on the floor exercise. She was dubbed "The Bride of Mexico" and "the Sweetheart of Mexico" by the admiring press and was serenaded with a folk song, "Natalie," during her stay in Mexico City.

The Olympics was Kuchinskaya's final competition. At the time, her sudden departure from gymnastics was attributed to a thyroid illness; in an interview in the late 1990s, Kuchinskaya also revealed that she had lost her motivation for the sport.

== Later life ==
Following her retirement, Kuchinskaya coached in the USSR, Japan and the United States. She has been married since 1980 to optician Alexander Kotliar and currently lives and coaches in the USA, running her own gymnastics club in Illinois. In 1999, she appeared on the "Soviet Sport War" episode of the PBS documentary The Red Files discussing her negative experiences in Soviet gymnastics. In 2006, she was inducted into the International Gymnastics Hall of Fame.

== Achievements ==
Year	Event	AA	Team	VT	UB	BB	FX
1965	USSR Championships	1st				1st	
1965	USSR Cup	2nd					
1966	World Championships	2nd	2nd	3rd	1st	1st	1st
1966	USSR Championships	1st			2nd	1st	1st
1966	USSR Cup	1st					
1967	European Championships					2nd	2nd
1967	USSR Championships	1st		1st	1st	1st	1st
1968	USSR Championships	1st					
