= Gábor Cseh =

Hungarian canoeist

Gábor Cseh (24 December 1916 – 27 July 1979) was a Hungarian sprint canoeist who competed in the late 1930s. At the 1936 Summer Olympics in Berlin, he finished 12th in the K-2 10000 m event while being eliminated in the heats of the K-2 1000 m event.
