= Werner Klingelfuss =

Swiss canoeist

Werner Klingelfuss (born 11 June 1913; date of death unknown) is a Swiss canoeist who competed in the 1936 Summer Olympics. In 1936 he and his partner Rudolf Vilim finished fifth in the K-2 1000 metres competition.
