= Gerardus Siderius =

Dutch canoeist

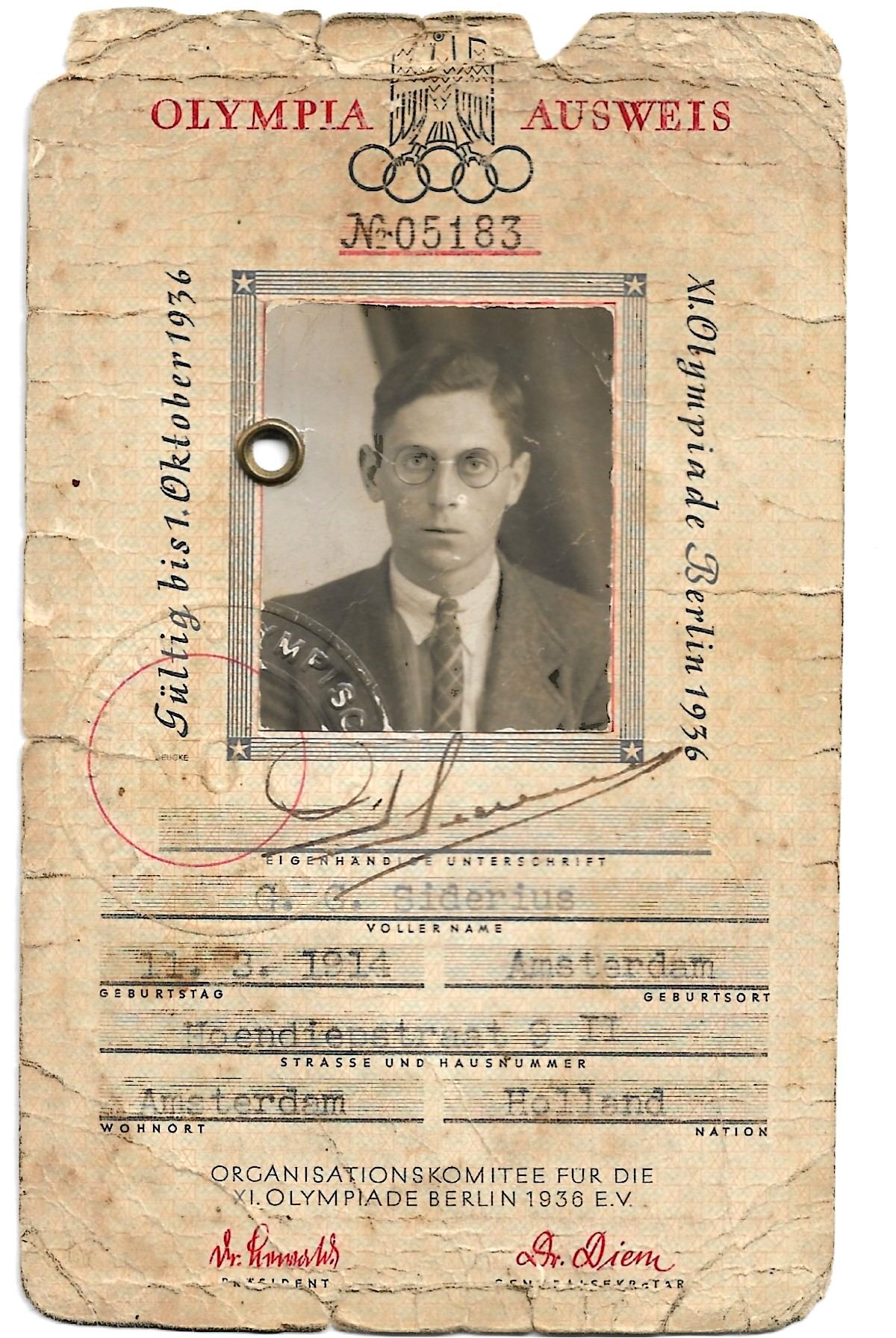

Gerardus Gijsbertus Siderius (11 March 1914, Amsterdam – 14 April 1990, Loosdrecht) was a Dutch canoeist who competed in the 1936 Summer Olympics. In 1936 he and his partner Henk Starreveld finished fifth in the K-2 10000 metres competition.
