= Bruno Lips =

Swiss canoeist

Bruno Lips (16 June 1908 – January 1939) was a Swiss canoeist who competed in the 1936 Summer Olympics, where he finished seventh in the K-1 10000 m event.
