= Jules Mackowiak =

French canoeist

Jules Mackowiak (12 February 1916 – 30 July 1999) was a French canoeist who competed in the 1936 Summer Olympics.

In 1936 he finished 13th in the K-1 10000 m event while being eliminated in the heats of the K-2 1000 m event.
