= Emil Šmatlák =

Czechoslovak sprint canoeist

Emil Šmatlák (January 27, 1916 – July 16, 2006) was a Czechoslovak sprint canoeist who competed in the late 1930s.

He completed in the K-1 1000 m event at the 1936 Summer Olympics in Berlin, but was eliminated in the heats.
