= Verner Løvgreen =

Danish canoeist

Verner Løvgreen (July 29, 1910 – May 6, 1990) was a Danish canoeist who competed in the 1936 Summer Olympics.

He was born in Copenhagen and died in Tårnby.

In 1936 he and his partner Axel Svendsen finished fourth in the K-2 10000 m event. Løvgreen and Svendsen also competed in the K-2 1000 m event and finished seventh.
