= Canoeing at the 1936 Summer Olympics – Men's K-2 10000 metres =

These are the results of the men's K-2 10000 metres competition in canoeing at the 1936 Summer Olympics. The K-2 event is raced by two-man canoe sprint kayaks, and took place on Friday, August 7.

Twenty-four canoeists from twelve nations competed.

== Medalists ==
Gold	Silver	Bronze
Paul Wevers and Ludwig Landen (GER)	Viktor Kalisch and Karl Steinhuber (AUT)	Tage Fahlborg and Helge Larsson (SWE)

== Final ==
Friday, August 7, 1936: Only a final was held.

Place	Canoeists	Time
1	Paul Wevers and Ludwig Landen (GER)	41:45.0
2	Viktor Kalisch and Karl Steinhuber (AUT)	42:05.4
3	Tage Fahlborg and Helge Larsson (SWE)	43:06.1
4	Verner Løvgreen and Axel Svendsen (DEN)	44:39.8
5	Henk Starreveld and Gerardus Siderius (NED)	45:12.5
6	Werner Zimmermann and Othmar Bach (SUI)	45:14.6
7	William Gaehler and William Lofgren (USA)	45:15.4
8	Zdeněk Černický and Jaroslav Humpál (TCH)	46:05.4
9	Charles Brahm and Clement Spiette (BEL)	47:26.1
10	Gordon Potter and Edward Deir (CAN)	47:38.2
11	Marian Kozłowski and Antoni Bazaniak (POL)	47:49.8
12	Gábor Cseh and Sándor Gelle (HUN)	48:47.5
