= Hans Mooser =

Swiss canoeist

Hans Mooser (born 18 February 1915; date of death unknown) was a Swiss canoeist who competed in the 1936 Summer Olympics. In 1936 he finished sixth in the folding K-1 10000 m event.
