= Joel Ramqvist =

Swedish canoeist

Erik Joel Ramqvist (13 July 1909 – 25 November 2001) was a Swedish canoeist who competed in the 1936 Summer Olympics.

He was born in Skinnskatteberg and died in Uppsala.

In 1936 he finished fifth in the K-1 1000 metre competition.
