= William Gaehler =

American canoeist

William Gaehler (February 15, 1896 – October 21, 1944) was an American canoeist who competed in the 1936 Summer Olympics.

He was born in New York City and died in Bronx, New York

In 1936 he and his partner William Lofgren finished seventh in the K-2 10000 metres competition.
