= Axel Svendsen =

Danish canoeist

Axel Valdemar Svendsen (March 8, 1912 – August 10, 1995) was a Danish canoeist who competed in the 1936 Summer Olympics. He was born and died in Copenhagen.

In 1936, he and his partner Verner Løvgreen finished fourth in the K-2 10000 metres competition. Svendsen and Løvgreen also competed in the K-2 1000 metres event and finished seventh.

Svendsen's wife, Bodil, also competed internationally for Denmark from the late 1930s to the early 1950s. She won three medals at the ICF Canoe Sprint World Championships and finished fifth in the K-1 500 m event at the 1952 Summer Olympics in Helsinki.
