= William Williamson (canoeist) =

Canadian canoeist

William Shortt Williamson (October 14, 1915 – May 15, 1991) was a Canadian canoeist who competed in the 1936 Summer Olympics.

In 1936 he finished 14th in the K-1 10000 m event.
