= Nils Wallin =

Swedish canoeist

Nils Olof Wallin (May 4, 1904 – March 8, 1987) was a Swedish canoeist who competed in the 1936 Summer Olympics.

He was born and died in Västervik.

In 1936 he finished ninth in the K-1 10000 m event.
