= Lennart Dozzi =

Swedish canoeist

Oreste Lennart Valentino Dozzi (May 3, 1910 – July 2, 1987) was a Swedish canoeist who competed in the 1936 Summer Olympics.

He was born in Stockholm and died in Bromma.

In 1936 he finished fourth in the folding K-1 10000 m event.
