= Louis Maes =

Belgian canoeist

Personal information
- Born: Lodewijk Petrus Celest Maes; 6 February 1913 Willebroek

Achievements and titles
- Olympic finals: 1936

Louis Maes (Willebroek, 6 February 1913, date of death unknown) was a Belgian canoeist who competed in the 1936 Summer Olympics.

In 1936 he finished 11th in the K-1 10000 m event.
