= Josip Zidarn =

Yugoslav canoeist

Josip Zidarn (24 September 1909 in Zagreb – 25 April 1982) is a Yugoslav canoeist who competed in the 1936 Summer Olympics. In 1936 he finished tenth in the K-1 10000 m event.
