= Ivar Iversen =

Norwegian canoeist

Medal record

Men's canoe sprint

World Championships
Silver medal – second place	1948 London	K-1 4 x 500 m

Ivar Iversen (24 August 1914 – 19 August 2012) was a Norwegian sprint canoeist who competed from the late 1930s to the late 1940s. He won a gold medal in the K-1 4 x 500 m event at the 1948 ICF Canoe Sprint World Championships in London.

Iversen also competed at the 1936 Summer Olympics in Berlin, finishing eighth in the K-1 1000 m event.

Note that the K-1 4 x 500 m event was separate from the canoeing competitions at the 1948 Summer Olympics in London. The K-1 4 x 500 m event was only held once at the 1960 Games in Rome.
