= Jan Vrolijk =

Dutch canoeist

Johannes "Jan" Vrolijk (March 21, 1917 – January 18, 1998) was a Dutch canoeist who competed in the 1936 Summer Olympics. He was born in Zaandam and died in Almelo.

In 1936, he finished ninth in the folding K-1 10000 m event.
