= William Lofgren =

American canoeist

William Lofgren (February 14, 1913 – June 11, 2004) was an American canoeist who competed in the 1936 Summer Olympics.

He was born in Brooklyn, New York and died in Phoenix, Arizona. Lofgren served in the United States Army during World War II in both China and India as a technical sergeant.

In 1936, Lofgren and his partner William Gaehler finished seventh in the K-2 10000 metres competition.
