= Péter Szittya =

Hungarian canoeist (1915–?)

Péter Szittya (born January 15, 1915, date of death unknown) was a Hungarian sprint canoeist who competed in the late 1930s. At the 1936 Summer Olympics in Berlin, he finished 12th in the K-1 10000 m event while being eliminated in the heats of the K-1 1000 m event.
