= Paul Wevers =

German sprint canoeist

Medal record

Men's canoe sprint

Representing Germany

Olympic Games
Gold medal – first place	1936 Berlin	K-2 10000 m

Paul Wevers (21 July 1907 – 6 March 1941) was a German sprint canoeist, born in Cologne, who competed in the late 1930s. He won a gold medal in the K-2 10000 m event at the 1936 Summer Olympics in Berlin.

Wevers was killed during World War II on 6 March 1941 in Braunschweig, Niedersachsen, Germany when his plane crashed into the ground.
