= Rafaela Chacón Nardi =

Cuban poet and educator

- Born: February 24, 1926; Havana, Cuba
- Died: March 11, 2001 (aged 75); Havana, Cuba
- Occupations: Poet, educator

Rafaela Chacón Nardi (February 24, 1926 – March 11, 2001) was a Cuban poet and educator. She was the author of more than 30 books. In 1971, at the request of UNESCO, she founded Grupo de Expresión Creadora (Creative Expression Group). She directed the Clubes de Promoción a la Lectura (Reading Promotion Clubs) for blind and low vision adolescents in Cuba. She was the recipient of the Alejo Carpentier medal.

== Biography ==
Nardi was born in Havana, Cuba, on February 24, 1926. She studied to be a teacher and then became a professor at Escuela Normal para Maestros, Universidad de La Habana, and Universidad Las Villas.

In 1948 she published her first volume of poems, Journey to the Dream. This work was reprinted in 1957, including the text of a letter Gabriela Mistral praising the poetry.

In 1971 based on her interest in design and development of educational activities for children with disabilities Nardi founded the Grupo de Expresión Creadora. She also organized children's workshops for the study of the work of José Martí.

Nardi died on March 11, 2001, in Havana, Cuba.

== Selected publications ==
Her publications include:

- Viaje al sueño (1948 and 1957 in expanded edition)
- Del silencio y las voces (1978)
- Coral del aire (1982)
- Una mujer desde su isla canta (1994)
- Vuelta de hoja (1995)
- Mínimo paraíso (1997)
- Del íntimo esplendor (2000)
- Ámbito de amar (posthumous, 2006)
