= Ludwig Landen =

German canoeist

Medal record

Men's canoe sprint

Representing Germany

Olympic Games
Gold medal – first place	1936 Berlin	K-2 10000 m

Ludwig Landen (6 November 1908 – 14 October 1985) was a German sprint canoeist, born in Cologne, who competed in the late 1930s. He won a gold medal in the K-2 10000 m event at the 1936 Summer Olympics in Berlin.
