= Henri Honsia =

Belgian canoeist

Henri Honsia (Mechelen, 26 May 1913 – Mechelen, 6 February 2004) was a Belgian sprint canoeist who competed in the late 1930s. At the 1936 Summer Olympics in Berlin, he was eliminated in the heats of the K-1 1000 m event.
