= Emilio Lecuona =

Spanish gymnast

- Full name: Emilio Lecuona Ley
- Alternative name: Emili Lecuona i Ley
- Born: 30 August 1935 Barcelona, Spain
- Died: 12 February 2004 (aged 68) Barcelona, Spain

Gymnastics career
- Discipline: Men's artistic gymnastics
- Country represented: Spain
- Club: G. Blume

Emilio Lecuona Ley (30 August 1935 – 12 February 2004) was a Spanish gymnast. He competed in eight events at the 1960 Summer Olympics.
