= Howard Kainz =

American philosopher

Howard Paul Kainz (born 1933) is professor emeritus at Marquette University, Milwaukee. He was a recipient of a National Endowment for the Humanities fellowship for 1977–1978, and Fulbright fellowships in Germany for 1980-1981 and 1987–1988. Kainz advocates aspects of the philosophy of G.W.F. Hegel.

== Books ==
- "Active and Passive Potency" in Thomistic Angelology (1972);
- Kainz, Howard P. (1974). Hegel's Philosophy of Right, with Marx's Commentary. doi:10.1007/978-94-010-2054-1. ISBN 978-90-247-1620-3.
- Hegel's Phenomenology, Part I: Analysis and Commentary (1976);
- Ethica Dialectica: A Study of Ethical Oppositions (1979);
- The Unbinding of Prometheus: Towards a Philosophy of Revolution (1980);
- The Philosophy of Man (1981);
- Hegel's Phenomenology, Part II: The Evolution of Ethical and Religious Consciousness to the Absolute Standpoint (1983);
- Philosophical Perspectives on Peace (1987);
- Ethics in Context: Toward the Definition and Differentation of the Morally Good (1988);
- Paradox, Dialectic, and System: A Reconstruction of the Hegelian Problematic (1988);
- Democracy and the "Kingdom of God" (1993);
- Hegel's Phenomenology of Spirit: Selections Translated and Annotated by Howard P. Kainz (1994);
- An Introduction To Hegel: The Stages Of Modern Philosophy (1996);
- GWF Hegel: The Philosophical System (1996);
- Politically Incorrect Dialogues (1999);
- Natural Law: an Introduction and Reexamination (2004);
- The Philosophy of Human Nature (2008)
- The Existence of God and the Faith-Instinct (2010).
- Paradox, Dialectic, and System (Choice Distinguished Scholarly Book award)
