= Stanley Potter (canoeist) =

Canadian canoeist (1915–1962)

Stanley E. Potter (30 April 1915 – 10 August 1962) is a Canadian canoeist who competed in the 1936 Summer Olympics. In 1936 he and his partner Frank Willis finished tenth in the folding K-2 10000 m event.
