= Gordon Potter (canoeist) =

Canadian canoeist

Gordon F. Potter (November 26, 1906 – June 14, 1971) was a Canadian canoeist who competed in the 1936 Summer Olympics. In 1936 he and his partner Edward Deir finished tenth in the K-2 10000 m event.
