= Maurice Larkin =

English historian

Maurice J. M. Larkin (1932 – 2004) was an English historian specializing in the history of the modern France. He held the Richard Pares Chair of History at Edinburgh University from 1976 till 1999. Larkin was also a Fellow of the Royal Historical Society.

== Life ==
Born in Harrow-On-The-Hill Middlesex on August 12, 1932, he was an assistant lecturer at Glasgow university from 1958 to 1961. He also married Enid Lowe in 1958, and had a son and daughter. Later he became a lecturer from 1961-1965, and a lecturer in history in University of Kent located in Canterbury from 1965 to 1968. He then became a Senior Lecturer from 1968 to 1976, and finally became a Professor of history in Edinburg University from 1976 to 1999. He died in North Berwick, East Lothian on 29 February 2004.

== Selected works ==
- Gathering Pace; Continental Europe 1870-1945. New York: Humanities Press, 1970.
- Church and State after the Dreyfus Affair. The Separation Issue in France. London: Macmillan, 1974
  - Translated into French as: L’Église et l’État en France. 1905 : la crise de la Séparation, Toulouse : Privat, Bibliothèque historique universelle, 2004
- Man and Society in Nineteenth-Century Realism. Macmillan, 1977
- France since the Popular Front : Government and People, 1936-1986. Oxford University Press, 1988, 1997
- Religion, Politics and Preferment in France since 1890. La Belle Époque and its Legacy. Cambridge University Press, 1995, 2002.

== Reception ==
His first book, a textbook entitled 'Gathering Pace: Continental Europe 1870-1945', according to his obituarist Robert Anderson, made him popular with student audiences owing to his ability to show 'the human aspects of history'.

His 1974 book on the events surrounding the 1905 separation of church and state in France was described as "a classic on French history of secularism" and as "still the standard account of the subject".

'France since the Popular Front; government and people 1936-86' according to Robert Anderson, 'rapidly established itself as an authoritative .... account of French History.

== See also ==
- France in the twentieth century
- Jean Baubérot
