= Karl Steinhuber =

Austrian canoeist

Olympic medal record

Men's canoe sprint
Silver medal – second place	1936 Berlin	K-2 10000 m

Karl Steinhuber (1 May 1906 in Linz – November 2002) was an Austrian sprint canoeist who competed in the late 1930s. He won a silver medal in the K-2 10000 m event at the 1936 Summer Olympics in Berlin.
