= Frans Nordberg =

Finnish canoeist

Frans Fjalar Nordberg (January 6, 1900 – November 11, 1984) was a Finnish canoeist who competed in the 1936 Summer Olympics.

He was born in Pellinki and died in Helsinki.

In 1936 he finished seventh in the folding K-1 10000 m event.
