= Jan Erik Adolfsen =

Norwegian ice hockey player

Jan Erik Adolfsen (June 1, 1930 – March 27, 2001) was a Norwegian ice hockey player. He played for the Norwegian national ice hockey team, and participated at the Winter Olympics in 1952, where the Norwegian team placed 9th.
