= Viktor Kalisch =

Austrian canoeist (1902–1976)

Olympic medal record

Men's canoe sprint
Silver medal – second place	1936 Berlin	K-2 10000 m

Viktor Kalisch (4 December 1902 in Linz – 21 July 1976) was an Austrian sprint canoeist who competed in the late 1930s. He won a silver medal in the K-2 10000 m event at the 1936 Summer Olympics in Berlin.
