= Ko van Tongeren =

Dutch canoeist

Jacobus "Ko" van Tongeren (19 August 1913 – 6 May 1996) was a Dutch canoeist who competed in the 1936 Summer Olympics.

He was born in Haarlem and died in Velsen.

In 1936 he finished fourth in the K-1 10000 metre competition.
