= Paul Uellendahl =

German water polo player (1919–2001)

Personal information
- Nationality: German
- Born: 17 November 1919; Barmen, Germany
- Died: 29 March 2001 (aged 81); Wuppertal, Germany

Sport
- Sport: Water polo

Paul Uellendahl (17 November 1919 – 29 March 2001) was a German water polo player. He competed in the men's tournament at the 1952 Summer Olympics.
