= Gregor Hradetzky =

Austrian canoeist (1909–1984)

Medal record

Men's canoe sprint

Representing Austria

Olympic Games
Gold medal – first place	1936 Berlin	K-1 1000 m
Gold medal – first place	1936 Berlin	Folding K-1 10000 m

Representing Germany

World Championships
Bronze medal – third place	1938 Vaxholm	K-1 1000 m

Gregor Hradetzky (31 January 1909 – 29 December 1984) was an Austrian canoeist and organ builder who competed in the late 1930s.

He was born in Krems an der Donau and died in Bad Kleinkirchheim.

At the 1936 Summer Olympics in Berlin, he won the gold medal in the K-1 1000 metre competition as well as in the folding K-1 10000 metres event. He is only one of two Austrians ever who won two Olympic gold medals in the same Summer Olympic Games (the other is Julius Lenhart).

Hradetzky also won a bronze in the K-1 1000 m event at the 1938 ICF Canoe Sprint World Championships in Vaxholm representing Germany.
