= Xaver Hörmann =

German canoeist

Personal information
- Born: 21 February 1910 Bubenhausen, German Empire
- Died: 23 February 1943 (aged 33) Donetsk, Reichskommissariat Ukraine

Sport
- Sport: Kayaking
- Event: Folding kayak
Medal record
Men's canoe sprint
Representing Germany
Olympic Games
Bronze medal – third place	1936 Berlin	Folding K-1 10000 m

Xaver Hörmann (21 February 1910 – 23 February 1943) was a German sprint canoeist who competed in the late 1930s. He won a bronze medal in the folding K-1 10000 m event at the 1936 Summer Olympics in Berlin.

Hörmann was killed in action during World War II.
