= Jaap Kraaier =

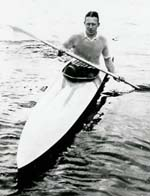
- Jaap Kraaier in the 1930s

Medal record

Men's flatwater canoeing
Bronze medal – third place	1936 Berlin	K-1 1000 m

Jacob "Jaap" Kraaier (November 28, 1913 – January 7, 2004) was a Dutch flatwater canoeist who competed in the 1930s. At the 1936 Summer Olympics in Berlin, he won the bronze medal in K-1 1000 m event. Following his career in sports, Kraaier established himself as a businessman and naval architect. One of his most famous designs is the Pirate dinghy (Dutch: "Piraatje") for children, thousands of which have been built since its inception in the 1950s. Kraaier was born in Zaandam and died in Egmond aan Zee.
