= Helge Larsson =

Swedish canoeist

Olympic medal record

Men's canoe sprint
Bronze medal – third place	1936 Berlin	K-2 10000 m

Helge Larsson (October 25, 1916 – November 19, 1971) was a Swedish sprint canoeist who competed in the late 1930s. He won the bronze medal in the K-2 10000 m event at the 1936 Summer Olympics in Berlin.
