= Helmut Cämmerer =

German canoeist (1911–1997)

Medal record

Men's canoe sprint

Representing Germany

Olympic Games
Silver medal – second place	1936 Berlin	K-1 1000 m

World Championships
Silver medal – second place	1938 Vaxholm	K-1 1000 m

Helmut Cämmerer (5 May 1911 – 4 October 1997) was a German sprint canoeist who competed in the 1930s. He won the silver medal in the K-1 1000 m event at the 1936 Summer Olympics in Berlin.

Cämmerer also won a silver medal in the K-1 1000 m event at the 1938 ICF Canoe Sprint World Championships in Vaxholm.

Helmut Martin Robert Cämmerer was born on 5 May 1911 in Hamburg. He died on 4 October 1997 in Buchholz in der Nordheide at the age of 86.
