= Nicolaas Tates =

Dutch canoeist

Olympic medal record

Men's canoe sprint
Bronze medal – third place	1936 Berlin	K-2 1000 m

Nicolaas Tates (born 5 May 1915 – 25 December 1990) was a Dutch canoeist who competed in the 1936 Summer Olympics.

He was born and died in Zaandam.

In 1936 he won the bronze medal in the folding K-2 1000 metre competition with his partner Wim van der Kroft.
