= Gordon Potter (cricketer) =

English cricketer

Personal information
- Full name: Gordon Potter
- Born: 26 October 1931 (age 95); Dormansland, Surrey, England
- Nickname: Gillie
- Batting: Right-handed
- Bowling: Leg break

Domestic team information
- Years: Team
- 1949–1957: Sussex

Career statistics
Competition	First-class
Matches	55
Runs scored	1,313
Batting average	17.98
100s/50s	–/4
Top score	88
Balls bowled	1,491
Wickets	19
Bowling average	45.42
5 wickets in innings	–
10 wickets in match	–
Best bowling	3/29
Catches/stumpings	34/–
- Source: Cricinfo, 22 June 2012

Gordon Potter (born 26 October 1931) is a former English cricketer. Potter was a right-handed batsman who bowled leg break. He was born at Dormansland, Surrey, England.

Potter made his first-class debut for Sussex against Cambridge University at Fenner's in 1949. His next first-class appearance for Sussex didn't come until 1953, when he played against Cambridge University, which was also his only appearance in that season. He began to play more regularly for Sussex from 1954, making a further 52 first-class appearances for the county, the last of which came against Somerset in 1957.

Potter was a batsman, and scored 1,313 runs at an average of 17.98, with a high score of 88. This score was one of four half centuries he made and came against Worcestershire in 1954. With his part-time leg breaks, he took 19 wickets at a bowling average of 45.42, with best figures of 3/29.
