= Tage Fahlborg =

Swedish canoeist (1912–2005)

Olympic medal record

Men's canoe sprint
| Bronze medal – third place | 1936 Berlin | K-2 10000 m |

Tage Fahlborg (April 24, 1912 – January 8, 2005) was a Swedish sprint canoeist who competed in the late 1930s. He won a bronze medal in the K-2 10000 m event at the 1936 Summer Olympics in Berlin.
