= Archibald Paton Thornton =

Scottish historian (1921–2004)

Archibald Paton Thornton (1921 – 19 February 2004) was a Scottish academic and historian. He was the author of the seminal history of the British Empire, The Imperial Idea and its Enemies: A Study in British Power (St. Martin's Press, 1959). He was professor of history at University College, University of Toronto.

== Life ==
Born in Glasgow, Scotland, Thornton attended Kelvinside Academy from 1929 to 1939. During the Second World War, he served in the British Army, attaining the rank of captain in the East Riding Imperial Yorkshire Yeomanry. He attended the University of Glasgow, where he received a Master of Arts degree in 1947. He received a D.Phil. from Trinity College, Oxford in 1952. After the war, he was a lecturer in modern history at Trinity College, Oxford from 1948 to 1950. From 1950 to 1957, he was a lecturer in Imperial history at the University of Aberdeen. From 1957 to 1960, he was a professor and chairman of history and dean of arts at the University College of West Indies. In 1960, he was made a professor of history at the University of Toronto and was chairman of the department from 1967 to 1972. He was attached to University College at the University of Toronto and retired in 1987.

He was the author of West-India Policy under the Restoration (1956), The Imperial Idea and its Enemies (1959), Doctrines of Imperialism (1965), The Habit of Authority (1966), For the File on Empire (1968), and Imperialism in the 20th Century (1978).

He was a Fellow of the Royal Society of Canada.
