= Zinaida Voronina =

Soviet gymnast

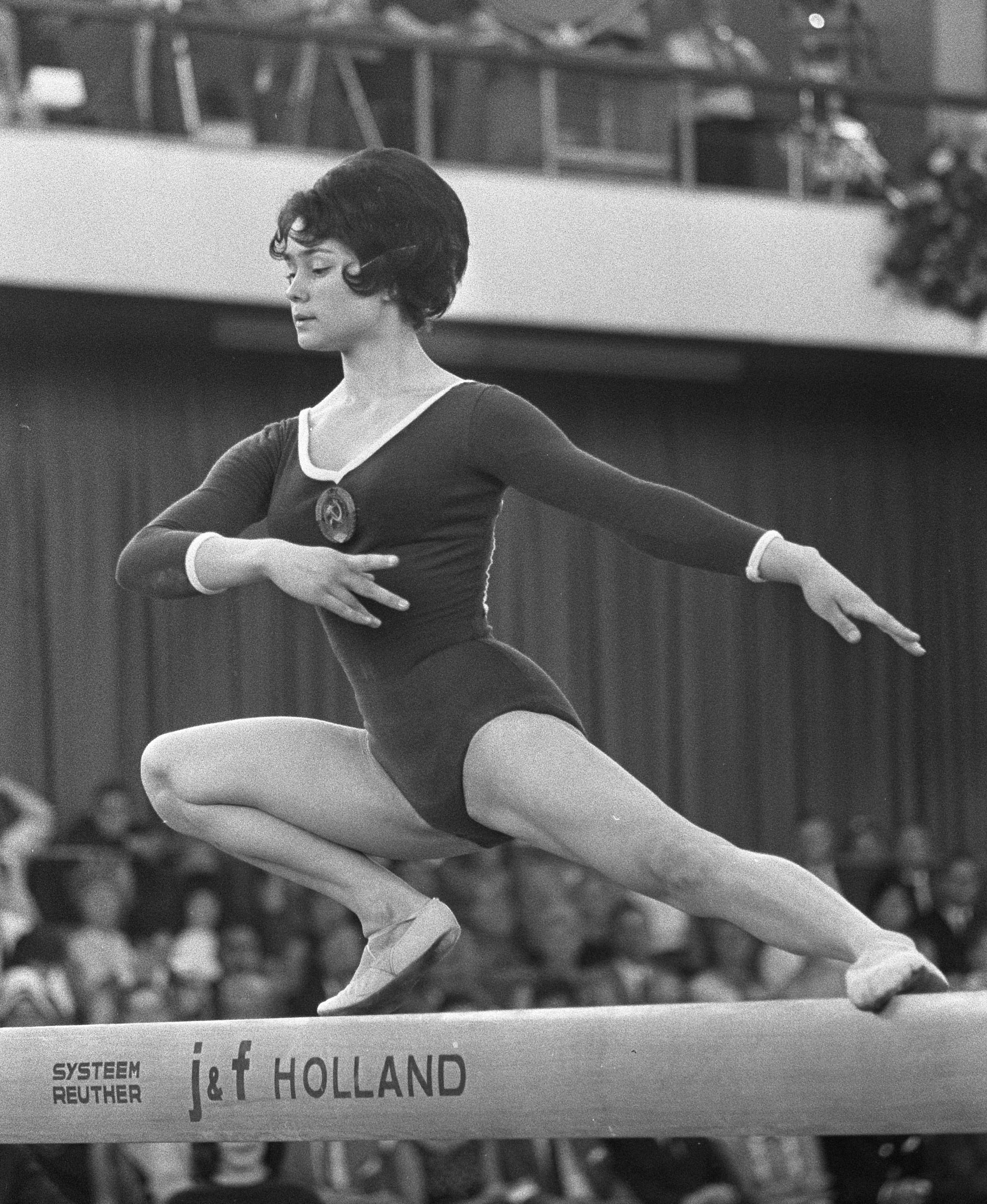
- Voronina in 1967

Personal information
- Born: 10 December 1947 Yoshkar-Ola, Russian SFSR, Soviet Union
- Died: 17 March 2001 (aged 53) Balashikha, Moscow Oblast, Russia
- Height: 1.64 m (5 ft 5 in)

Gymnastics career
- Discipline: Women's artistic gymnastics
- Country represented: Soviet Union
- Club: Dynamo Moscow
- Retired: 1972
Medal record
Representing Soviet Union
Olympic Games
Gold medal – first place	1968 Mexico City	Team
Silver medal – second place	1968 Mexico City	All-Around
Bronze medal – third place	1968 Mexico City	Vault
Bronze medal – third place	1968 Mexico City	Uneven bars
World Championships
Gold medal – first place	1970 Ljubljana	Team
Silver medal – second place	1966 Dortmund	Team
Bronze medal – third place	1966 Dortmund	Floor Exercise
Bronze medal – third place	1970 Ljubljana	All-around
Bronze medal – third place	1970 Ljubljana	Uneven Bars
Bronze medal – third place	1970 Ljubljana	Floor Exercise
European Championships
Silver medal – second place	1967 Amsterdam	All-Around
Bronze medal – third place	1967 Amsterdam	Balance Beam
Bronze medal – third place	1967 Amsterdam	Floor Exercise

Zinaida Voronina, born Zinaida Borisovna Druzhinina (also Druginina), (Russian: Зинаида Борисовна Дружинина Воронина; 10 December 1947 – 17 March 2001) was a Soviet gymnast who competed at the European, World, and Olympic level from the mid-1960s to early 1970s.

Training under Vladimir Shelkovnikov, Voronina's major debut came at the 1966 World Championships in Dortmund, Germany. There she won a bronze medal on the floor exercise, receiving the highest individual score of any gymnast at those games (9.933), which might have been the first time that any woman gymnast broke the 9.900 score barrier in the post-1952 era, presaging the perfect 10s that Věra Čáslavská would score the next year at the 1967 European Championships and the perfect 10s that Nadia Comăneci would score so famously at the 1976 Montreal Summer Olympics.

She went on to win several individual medals over the next four years, most notably at the 1968 Summer Olympics where she won the individual all-around silver behind Věra Čáslavská. At the same games, she became Olympic champion in the team competition.

Around the time of the 1968 games, she married Olympic gymnast Mikhail Voronin. Shortly thereafter she gave birth to a son, Dmitry, and came back to further successes at the 1970 World Championships, among other games. She attempted to make the Soviet team for the 1972 Olympics, but faced a strong competition and only placed 10th in the individual all-around at the national championships.

The same year she retired and started working as a gymnastics coach together with her husband. Saddled with her professional life and a difficult childhood (alcoholic mother, father she never met) she struggled with alcoholism. In 1980, she was divorced from her husband, who received custody of their son (he later became a competitive gymnast). Subsequently, she was sent out of Moscow for "anti-social behavior". She spent the remainder of her years working in a factory in Balashikha, Russia, dying in March 2001 at the age of 53.

In 1969, she was awarded the "Order of the Badge of Honor".

The minor planet (567329) Zinaida = 2001 BY_{84}, from the dynamic class of Jupiter Trojans - group L4, was named in her honour.
