= Wim van der Kroft =

Dutch canoeist (1916–2001)

Olympic medal record

Men's canoe sprint
Bronze medal – third place	1936 Berlin	K-2 1000 m

Willem "Wim" Frederik van der Kroft (August 16, 1916 – March 21, 2001) was a Dutch canoeist who competed in the 1936 Summer Olympics, in the 1948 Summer Olympics, and in the 1952 Summer Olympics.

He was born in Haarlem and died in Den Helder.

In 1936 he won the bronze medal in the folding K-2 1000 metre competition with his partner Nicolaas Tates.

At the London Games 1948 he finished fifth in the K-1 1000 metre event.

Four years later he finished fourth in the K-1 1000 metre competition.
