= Adolf Kainz =

Austrian canoeist

Medal record

Men's canoe sprint

Representing Austria

Olympic Games
| Gold medal – first place | 1936 Berlin | K-2 1000 m |

Representing Germany

World Championships
| Bronze medal – third place | 1938 Vaxholm | K-2 10000 m |

Adolf "Adi" Kainz (5 June 1903, in Linz – 12 July 1948) was an Austrian sprint canoeist who competed in the late 1930s. He won the gold medal in the K-2 1000 m event at the 1936 Summer Olympics in Berlin.

Kainz also won a bronze medal in the K-2 10000 m event at the 1938 ICF Canoe Sprint World Championships in Vaxholm though he competed under Germany because they had annexed Austria earlier that year.
