= Fritz Bondroit =

German canoeist (1912–1974)

Olympic medal record

Men's canoe sprint
Silver medal – second place	1936 Berlin	K-2 1000 m

Friedrich Karl Bondroit (26 March 1912 – 19 September 1974) was a German canoeist who competed in the 1936 Summer Olympics. He was born in Herford.

In 1936 he won the silver medal in the K-2 1000 m competition with his partner Ewald Tilker.

Bondroit died on 19 September 1974 in Burscheid at the age of 62.
