= Ernest Riedel =

American canoeist

Olympic medal record

Men's canoe sprint
Bronze medal – third place	1936 Berlin	K-1 10000 m

Ernest W. Riedel (July 13, 1901 – March 26, 1983) was an American sprint canoeist who competed from the late 1930s to the late 1940s. Competing in two Summer Olympics, he won a bronze medal in the K-1 10000 m event at Berlin in 1936. He was associated with the Pendleton Canoe Club of New York.

A native of New York City, he died in Dade County, Florida.
