= Fritz Landertinger =

Austrian canoeist (1914–1943)

Olympic medal record

Men's canoe sprint
Silver medal – second place	1936 Berlin	K-1 10000 m

Fritz Landertinger (Krems an der Donau, 26 February 1914 – Shlisselburg, 18 January 1943) was an Austrian canoeist who competed in the late 1930s. He won the silver medal in the K-1 10000 m event at the 1936 Summer Olympics in Berlin. He was killed in action during World War II.
