= Ewald Tilker =

German canoeist (1911–1998)

Medal record

Men's canoe sprint

Representing Germany

Olympic Games
Silver medal – second place	1936 Berlin	K-2 1000 m

Ewald Tilker (3 November 1911 – 8 September 1998) was a German canoeist who competed in the 1936 Summer Olympics. He won the silver medal in the K-2 1000 m event with Fritz Bondroit.
