= Canoeing at the Summer Olympics =

- IOC Code: CSL (Canoe Slalom); CSP (Canoe Sprint); CMA (Canoe Marathon)
- Governing body: ICF
- Events: 16 (men: 8; women: 8)

Summer Olympics
- 1896; 1900; 1904; 1908; 1912; 1920; 1924; 1928; 1932; 1936; 1948; 1952; 1956; 1960; 1964; 1968; 1972; 1976; 1980; 1984; 1988; 1992; 1996; 2000; 2004; 2008; 2012; 2016; 2020; 2024; 2028; 2032; Note: demonstration or exhibition sport years indicated in italics
- Medalists; men; women

Canoeing has been featured as competition sports in the Summer Olympic Games since the 1936 Games in Berlin, and they were also demonstration sports at the 1924 Games in Paris. There are two current disciplines of canoeing in Olympic competition: slalom and sprint.

Two styles of boats are used in this sport: canoes with 1 or 2 canoers and kayaks with 1, 2 or 4 kayakers. This leads to the name designation of each event. For example, "C-1" is a canoe singles event and "K-2" is a kayak doubles event. '"KX-1" denotes kayak cross. Races are usually 500 metres or 1000 metres long, although there were also 10 km events from 1936 to 1956. On 13 August 2009, it was announced by the International Canoe Federation that the men's 500 m events would be replaced at the 2012 Summer Olympics by 200 m events with one of them being K-1 200 m for the women. The other events for men at 200 m will be C-1, K-1, and K-2. This was confirmed at their 2009 Board of Directors meeting in Windsor, Berkshire, Great Britain on 5 December 2009. Kayak cross was introduced in the 2024 Summer Olympics.

== Summary ==
Key

Canoeing was demonstration sport
Canoeing events not held
Olympic Games not held

Games	Year	Events	Best Nation
1			
2			
3			
4			
5			
6			
7			
8	1924	6	Canada (1)
9			
10			
11	1936	9	Austria (1)
12			
13			
14	1948	9	Sweden (1)
15	1952	9	Finland (1)
16	1956	9	Romania (1)
17	1960	7	Soviet Union (1)

Games	Year	Events	Best Nation
18	1964	7	Soviet Union (2)
19	1968	7	Hungary (1)
20	1972	11	Soviet Union (3)
21	1976	11	Soviet Union (4)
22	1980	11	Soviet Union (5)
23	1984	12	New Zealand (1)
24	1988	12	East Germany (1)
25	1992	16	Germany (1)
26	1996	16	Germany (2)
27	2000	16	Hungary (2)
28	2004	16	Germany (3)
29	2008	16	Germany (4)
30	2012	16	Germany (5)
31	2016	16	Germany (6)
32	2020	16	Hungary (3)
33	2024	16	New Zealand (2)
34	2028	16	

== Canoe sprint ==
=== Men's ===
Current programme
Event	36	48	52	56	60	64	68	72	76	80	84	88	92	96	00	04	08	12	16	20	24	28	Total
C-1 1000 m	•	•	•	•	•	•	•	•	•	•	•	•	•	•	•	•	•	•	•	•	•	•	22
C-2 500 m									•	•	•	•	•	•	•	•	•				•	•	11
K-1 1000 m	•	•	•	•	•	•	•	•	•	•	•	•	•	•	•	•	•	•	•	•	•	•	22
K-2 500 m									•	•	•	•	•	•	•	•	•				•	•	11
K-4 500 m																				•	•	•	3

Past events
Event	36	48	52	56	60	64	68	72	76	80	84	88	92	96	00	04	08	12	16	20	24	28	Total
C-1 200 m																		•	•				2
C-1 500 m									•	•	•	•	•	•	•	•	•						9
C-2 1000 m	•	•	•	•	•	•	•	•	•	•	•	•	•	•	•	•	•	•	•	•			20
K-1 500 m									•	•	•	•	•	•	•	•	•						9
K-1 4 × 500 m					•																		1
K-2 200 m																		•	•				2
K-2 1000 m	•	•	•	•	•	•	•	•	•	•	•	•	•	•	•	•	•	•	•	•			20
K-4 1000 m						•	•	•	•	•	•	•	•	•	•	•	•	•	•				14

=== Women's ===
Event	36	48	52	56	60	64	68	72	76	80	84	88	92	96	00	04	08	12	16	20	24	28	Total
C-1 200 m																				•	•	•	3
C-2 500 m																				•	•	•	3
K-1 500 m		•	•	•	•	•	•	•	•	•	•	•	•	•	•	•	•	•	•	•	•	•	21
K-2 500 m					•	•	•	•	•	•	•	•	•	•	•	•	•	•	•	•	•	•	18
K-4 500 m											•	•	•	•	•	•	•	•	•	•	•	•	12

Past events
Event	36	48	52	56	60	64	68	72	76	80	84	88	92	96	00	04	08	12	16	20	24	28	Total
K-1 200 m																		•	•	•			3
Total	4	5	5	5	7	7	7	7	11	11	12	12	12	12	12	12	12	12	12	12	10	10	

=== Medal table ===
Last updated after the 2024 Paris Olympics. Note that this table includes both canoe sprint and canoe marathon medals.

Rank	Nation	Gold	Silver	Bronze	Total
1	Germany	31	18	17	66
2	Soviet Union	29	13	9	51
3	Hungary	28	35	30	93
4	Sweden	15	11	4	30
5	New Zealand	13	2	2	17
6	Romania	10	10	14	34
7	East Germany	10	7	8	25
8	Norway	6	4	4	14
9	Czechoslovakia	6	3	1	10
10	Canada	5	11	12	28
11	Spain	5	10	8	23
12	United States	5	4	4	13
13	Finland	5	2	3	10
14	China	5	2	0	7
15	Italy	4	8	3	15
16	Australia	4	6	12	22
17	Bulgaria	4	5	8	17
18	United Team of Germany	4	5	2	11
19	Czech Republic	4	1	3	8
20	Denmark	3	6	8	17
21	Austria	3	4	5	12
22	Ukraine	3	4	4	11
23	Great Britain	3	1	5	9
24	Russia	2	4	6	12
25	Belarus	2	3	4	9
26	West Germany	2	3	2	7
27	Yugoslavia	2	2	1	5
28	France	1	6	11	18
29	Brazil	1	3	1	5
29	Cuba	1	3	1	5
31	Unified Team	1	1	0	2
32	Poland	0	7	14	21
33	Netherlands	0	3	5	8
34	Slovakia	0	3	2	5
35	Latvia	0	2	0	2
36	Moldova	0	1	2	3
37	Azerbaijan	0	1	1	2
37	Portugal	0	1	1	2
39	Serbia	0	1	0	1
39	Switzerland	0	1	0	1
41	Israel	0	0	1	1
41	Lithuania	0	0	1	1
41	South Africa	0	0	1	1
Totals (43 entries)		217	217	220	654

== Canoe slalom ==
=== Events ===
Current program
Event	72	76	80	84	88	92	96	00	04	08	12	16	20	24	28	Total
Men's C-1	•					•	•	•	•	•	•	•	•	•	•	11
Men's K-1	•					•	•	•	•	•	•	•	•	•	•	11
Men’s KX-1														•	•	2
Women's C-1													•	•	•	3
Women's K-1	•					•	•	•	•	•	•	•	•	•	•	11
Women’s KX-1														•	•	2
Past events
Event	72	76	80	84	88	92	96	00	04	08	12	16	20	24	28	Total
Men's C-2	•					•	•	•	•	•	•	•				8
Total	4	0	0	0	0	4	4	4	4	4	4	4	4	6	6	

=== Medal table ===
Last updated after the 2024 Summer Olympics

Rank	Nation	Gold	Silver	Bronze	Total
1	France	8	5	8	21
2	Slovakia	8	4	4	16
3	Germany	5	3	9	17
4	Australia	4	3	3	10
5	East Germany	4	0	1	5
6	Czech Republic	3	5	3	11
7	Italy	3	0	1	4
8	Great Britain	2	9	3	14
9	United States	1	2	3	6
10	Slovenia	1	2	0	3
11	Spain	1	1	2	4
12	Czechoslovakia	1	1	0	2
12	New Zealand	1	1	0	2
14	West Germany	0	3	1	4
15	Poland	0	2	0	2
16	Austria	0	1	1	2
17	Japan	0	0	1	1
17	Russia	0	0	1	1
17	Togo	0	0	1	1
Totals (19 entries)		42	42	42	126

== Canoe marathon ==
Canoe marathon at the Summer Olympics
- IOC Code: CMA
- Events: 6 (men: 6; women: 0)

Summer Olympics
- 1896; 1900; 1904; 1908; 1912; 1920; 1924; 1928; 1932; 1936; 1948; 1952; 1956; 1960; 1964; 1968; 1972; 1976; 1980; 1984; 1988; 1992; 1996; 2000; 2004; 2008; 2012; 2016; 2020; 2024; 2028; 2032

Men's races of 10,000 metres were held from 1936 to 1956 and were considered canoe marathons, separate from the sprint and slalom disciplines.

=== Men's ===
Past events
Event	36	48	52	56	60	64	68	72	76	80	84	88	92	96	00	04	08	12	16	20	24	28	Total
C-1 10000 m		•	•	•																			3
C-2 10000 m	•	•	•	•																			4
K-1 10000 m	•	•	•	•																			4
K-2 10000 m	•	•	•	•																			4
Folding K-1 10000 m	•																						1
Folding K-2 10000 m	•																						1
Total	5	4	4	4	0	0	0	0	0	0	0	0	0	0	0	0	0	0	0	0	0	0	

== Overall medal table ==
Updated after 2024

Rank	Nation	Gold	Silver	Bronze	Total
1	Germany	36	21	26	83
2	Soviet Union	29	13	9	51
3	Hungary	28	35	30	93
4	Sweden	15	11	4	30
5	East Germany	14	7	9	30
6	New Zealand	14	3	2	19
7	Romania	10	10	14	34
8	France	9	11	19	39
9	Australia	8	9	15	32
10	Slovakia	8	7	6	21
11	Italy	7	8	4	19
12	Czech Republic	7	6	6	19
13	Czechoslovakia	7	4	1	12
14	United States	6	6	7	19
15	Norway	6	4	4	14
16	Canada	5	11	12	28
17	Great Britain	5	10	8	23
17	Spain	5	10	8	23
19	Finland	5	2	3	10
20	China	5	2	0	7
21	Bulgaria	4	5	8	17
22	United Team of Germany	4	5	2	11
23	Denmark	3	6	8	17
24	Austria	3	5	6	14
25	Ukraine	3	4	4	11
26	West Germany	2	6	3	11
27	Russia	2	4	7	13
28	Belarus	2	3	4	9
29	Yugoslavia	2	2	1	5
30	Brazil	1	3	1	5
30	Cuba	1	3	1	5
32	Slovenia	1	2	0	3
33	Unified Team	1	1	0	2
34	Poland	0	9	14	23
35	Netherlands	0	3	5	8
36	Latvia	0	2	0	2
37	Moldova	0	1	2	3
38	Azerbaijan	0	1	1	2
38	Portugal	0	1	1	2
40	Serbia	0	1	0	1
40	Switzerland	0	1	0	1
42	Israel	0	0	1	1
42	Japan	0	0	1	1
42	Lithuania	0	0	1	1
42	South Africa	0	0	1	1
42	Togo	0	0	1	1
Totals (46 entries)		258	258	260	776

== Nations ==
Nation	96	00	04	08	12	20	24	28	32	36	48	52	56	60	64	68	72	76	80	84	88	92	96	00	04	08	12	16	20	24	Years	
Algeria																													1	1	2	
Andorra																										1			1	1	3	
Angola																										1	2			2	3	
Antigua and Barbuda																							3								1	
Argentina																				1	8	5	4	3	2	2	3	10	4	2	11	
Australia													8	7	10	6	7	8	5	9	8	17	23	21	16	16	20	18	16	15	18	
Austria										9	7	7	7	10	5	4	12	2	6	2		4	3	4	2	4	4	2	5	2	20	
Armenia																								1							1	
Azerbaijan																											3	4			2	
Belarus																							4	5	9	8	12	12	12	^{a}	7	
Belgium										9	9	4	2	4	2	3	8	11	6	5	2	2	3	1	3	2	4	1	4	2	21	
Belize																													1		1	
Bolivia															1	1															2	
Bosnia and Herzegovina																						1	1		1						3	
Brazil																						6	3	4	2	2	3	13	5	8	9	
Bulgaria														5	2	3	7	12	12		12	11	11	7	7	2	1	2	1	1	16	
Canada							(D)			8	7	11	9	6	6	10	12	14		15	14	18	21	16	19	21	8	9	18	15	21	
Chile																									1	1			2	2	4	
China																				4	4	4	8		15	23	18	10	18	17	10	
Chinese Taipei																													1	3	2	
Cook Islands																											2	2	3		3	
Colombia																														1	1	
Comoros																														1	1	
Costa Rica																						4	2								2	
Croatia																						4	4	4	3	2	1		3	2	8	
Cuba																	2		3			5		3	4	4	6	6	5	3	10	
Czech Republic																							25	19	10	7	11	12	9	9	8	
Czechoslovakia										13	13	13	5	10	4	5	23	11	9		9	27									12	
Denmark										4	7	9	7	9	7	5	6	1	1	1	6	6	4	3	2	4	5	5	4	6	21	
East Germany																12	26	11	13		15										5	
Ecuador																											1	1			2	
Egypt																											1	2	2	1	4	
Estonia																						1	1	1							3	
Finland										3	5	10	6	9	3	5	4	7	4	5	3	2	1	1	2	4	2				18	
France										3	10	13	6	9	2	6	14	13	11	14	16	31	19	14	13	15	14	15	13	13	21	
Georgia																												1			1	
Germany										14		10										29	27	25	26	22	21	16	21	21	21	
Great Britain										3	7	7	3	7	5	10	20	11	11	15	17	25	17	12	9	7	15	11	8	4	21	
Greece																								1	6	3	1				4	
Guam																										1				1	2	
Guatemala																							1								1	
Hong Kong																		6		7	2	2									4	
Hungary										5	5	12	13	9	10	10	12	14	16		16	14	19	15	16	16	13	18	18	15	20	
Independent Olympic Participants																						5									1	
Individual Neutral Athletes																														5	1	
Indonesia																						3			1						2	
Iran																								1			2		1	2	4	
Ireland																	4	4	2	1	4	5	6	3	2	1	3		1	3	13	
Israel																				1			1	5	3	1					5	
Italy										1		6		12	4	2	10	11	5	7	5	18	15	8	8	16	8	4	7	6	19	
Ivory Coast																3	5			4	2	2	2			1					7	
Japan															12	2	5	3		5	8	6	8	2	5	9	8	5	12	3	15	
Kazakhstan																							8	4	3	7	5	13	7	6	8	
Kyrgyzstan																							2								1	
Latvia																						3	3	1	1	3	2	2	1	5	9	
Lebanon																												1			1	
Lithuania																						1	2	3	3	4	2	6	1		8	
Luxembourg										3	3	4		3																	4	
North Macedonia																							3	1	1	1					4	
Malaysia																							1								1	
Mexico																12	7	4		2		4	6	2		3	1	1	1	3	12	
Moldova																							4					1	3	3	4	
Morocco																								1			1	1	2	2	5	
Mozambique																												1	1		2	
Myanmar																										1					1	
Netherlands										9	7	5		4	5	7	2	2	6	3	2	4	2		2	2			1	3	17	
New Zealand																	2	4	3	6	7	8	1		2	5	8	9	8	13	13	
Nigeria																											1	1	1	2	4	
Norway										1	4	4	1	2		5	6	7		13	7	7	5	4	6	1	2		1	4	18	
Palau																												1			1	
Panama																							1								1	
Peru																						1									1	
Poland										2	3		4	6	9	8	23	13	15		12	18	23	21	23	21	13	15	13	16	19	
Portugal																					3	7	6	1	1	4	6	7	8	4	10	
Refugee Olympic Team																													1	4	2	
Romania												1	5	11	11	11	11	13	14	14	5	14	14	13	10	5	11	8	2	3	19	
Russia																							14	12	8	14	21	19	^{b}	^{a}	6	
ROC																													17		1	
Saar												3																			1	
Samoa																										1	1	1	3	2	5	
São Tomé and Príncipe																										1		1	2	1	4	
Senegal																										2	1	3	1	2	5	
Serbia																											12	10	3	8	4	
Serbia and Montenegro																							1	6	2						3	
Seychelles																									1	1					2	
Singapore																											1			1	2	
Slovakia																							17	19	16	12	12	12	9	4	8	
Slovenia																						6	5	4	4	3	6	6	6	4	9	
South Africa																						11	1	2	1	10	2	1		5	8	
South Korea																				2	15	6	2	1		1		2	1		8	
Soviet Union												13	9	12	13	11	15	15	15		17										9	
Spain														2		5	4	7	5	10	11	22	19	17	14	10	8	11	15	19	16	
Sweden										9	9	10	6	6	7	11	10	11	12	11	11	13	12	10	5	3	6	5	3	5	21	
Switzerland										9	6	7		4			6		3	4	1	6	8	3	4	1	2		3	2	16	
Thailand																											1		1		2	
Togo																									1	1	1				3	
Tunisia																											3	3	4	2	4	
Turkey																												1			1	
Ukraine																							13	11	7	6	2	9	11	8	8	
United Team of Germany													10	10	12																3	
Unified Team																						19									1	
United States							(D)			10	8	9	12	13	11	12	26	16		16	16	32	25	14	17	7	7	6	4	5	21	
Uruguay																						1			1					1	3	
Uzbekistan																							17	1	7	1	2	4	2	3	7	
Venezuela																										3					1	
Vietnam																									1					1	2	
West Germany																13	28	13		15	14										5	
Yugoslavia										4		1		3	4	2	13	1	3	3	3										10	
No. of nations																																94
No. of athletes																																
Year	96	00	04	08	12	20	24	28	32	36	48	52	56	60	64	68	72	76	80	84	88	92	96	00	04	08	12	16	20	24		

Notes:
^{a}: Due to Russia's 2022 invasion of Ukraine in violation of the Olympic Truce, the Russian Federation and Belarus were banned from sending athletes to the 2024 Summer Olympics. Russian and Belarusian athletes competed under the designation of Individual Neutral Athletes and are listed separately.
^{b}: Due to the Russian doping scandal, the Russian Federation was not permitted to send athletes to the 2020 Summer Olympics; athletes instead competed under the acronym "ROC" ("Russian Olympic Committee") and are listed separately.

== See also ==
- List of Olympic venues in canoeing
- Paracanoe at the Summer Paralympics
