= Strathmann =

Strathmann is a German surname. Notable people with the surname include:

- Ernst Strathmann, German sprint canoeist
- Heine Strathmann, German sprint canoeist
- Hermann Strathmann (1882–1966), German theologian and politician

== See also ==
- Strattmann
