= Hasenfus =

Hasenfus is a surname (probably of German origin. Besides other meanings, "Hasenfuß" in German colloquially refers to a fearful person or a coward). Notable people with the surname include:

- Eugene Hasenfus (1941–2025), a United States Marine helping the right-wing rebel Contras in Nicaragua
- Joseph Hasenfus (1913–1999), American canoeist
- Tavis Hasenfus, American attorney and politician in Maine
- Walter Hasenfus (1916–1944), American canoeist

== See also ==
- Wolfgang Hasenfuss (1900–1944), Latvian chess master
