= List of Olympic venues in canoeing =

For the Summer Olympics there are 26 venues that have been or will be used in canoeing. Initially set for canoe sprint (flatwater racing until November 2008), canoe slalom (slalom racing until November 2008) was first added at the 1972 Summer Olympics in Munich. Dropped after those games, canoe slalom was reinstituted at the 1992 Summer Olympics in Barcelona. Usually, the rowing events have been held in the same venues as canoe sprint, the exceptions being 1952, 1964 and 1992.

Games	Venue	Other sports hosted at venue for those games	Capacity	Ref.
1936 Berlin	Berlin-Grünau Regatta Course	Rowing	19,000	
1948 London	Henley Royal Regatta	Rowing	Not listed.	
1952 Helsinki	Taivallahti	None	Not listed.	
1956 Melbourne	Lake Wendouree	Rowing	14,300	
1960 Rome	Lake Albano	Rowing	10,000	
1964 Tokyo	Lake Sagami	None	1,500	
1968 Mexico City	Virgilio Uribe Rowing and Canoeing Course	Rowing	17,600	
1972 Munich	Eiskanal (slalom)	None	25,000	
1972 Munich	Regattastrecke Oberschleißheim (sprint)	Rowing	41,000	
1976 Montreal	Notre Dame Island	Rowing	27,000	
1980 Moscow	Krylatskoye Sports Complex Canoeing and Rowing Basin	Rowing	21,600	
1984 Los Angeles	Lake Casitas	Rowing	4,680	
1988 Seoul	Han River Regatta Course/Canoeing Site	Rowing	25,000	
1992 Barcelona	Canal Olímpic de Catalunya (sprint)	None	500	
1992 Barcelona	Parc Olímpic del Segre (slalom)	None	2,500	
1996 Atlanta	Lake Lanier (sprint)	Rowing	17,300	
1996 Atlanta	Ocoee Whitewater Center (slalom)	None	14,400	
2000 Sydney	Penrith Whitewater Stadium (slalom)	None	12,500	
2000 Sydney	Sydney International Regatta Centre (sprint)	Rowing	20,000	
2004 Athens	Olympic Canoe/Kayak Slalom Centre (slalom)	None	3,150	
2004 Athens	Schinias Olympic Rowing and Canoeing Centre (sprint)	Rowing	14,000	
2008 Beijing	Shunyi Olympic Rowing-Canoeing Park	Rowing, Swimming (marathon)	37,000	
2012 London	Dorney Lake (sprint)	Rowing	30,000	
2012 London	Lee Valley White Water Centre (slalom)	None	12,000	
2016 Rio de Janeiro	Lagoa Rodrigo de Freitas (sprint)	Rowing	14,000	
2016 Rio de Janeiro	Olympic Whitewater Stadium (slalom)	None	8,000	
2020 Tokyo	Kasai Canoe Slalom Centre (slalom)	None	7,500	
2020 Tokyo	Sea Forest Waterway (sprint)	Rowing	12,800	
2024 Paris	Vaires-sur-Marne Nautical Stadium	Rowing	24,000	
2028 Los Angeles	Riversport OK, Oklahoma City (slalom)	None	8,000	
2028 Los Angeles	Long Beach Marine Stadium (sprint)	Rowing	Not listed.	
2032 Brisbane	Redland Whitewater Centre (slalom)	None	8,000	
2032 Brisbane	Wyaralong Flatwater Centre (sprint)	Rowing	14,000	

== Gallery of venues ==
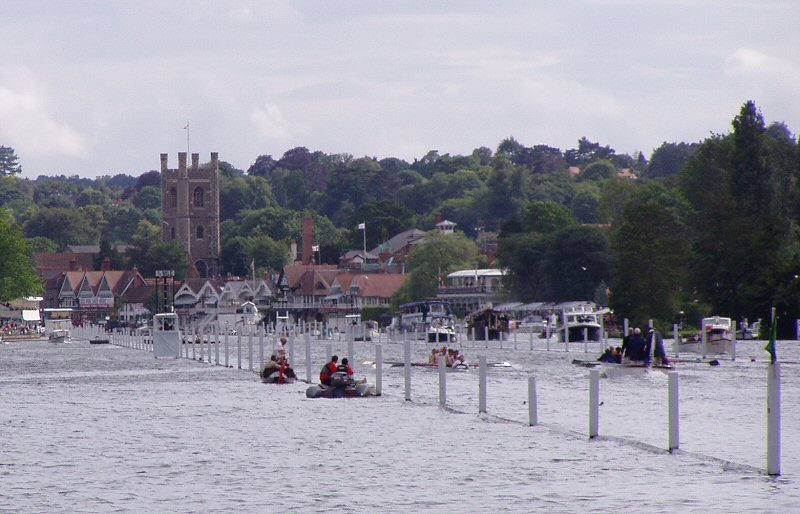
Henley Royal Regatta hosted canoeing at the 1948 Summer Olympics in London.

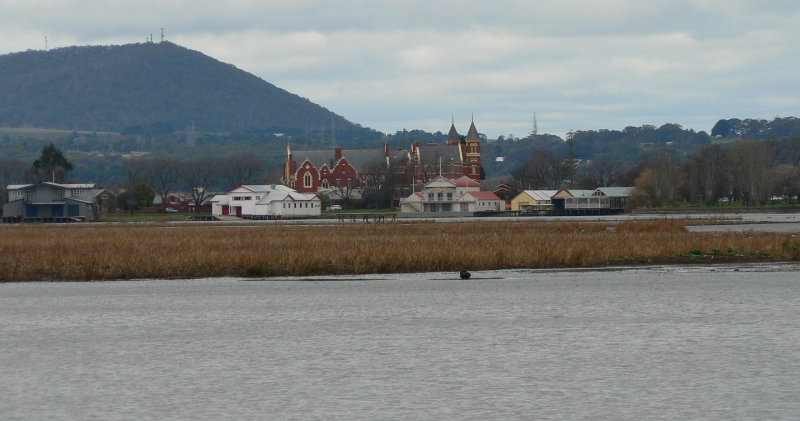
Lake Wendouree hosted canoeing at the 1956 Summer Olympics were in Melbourne.

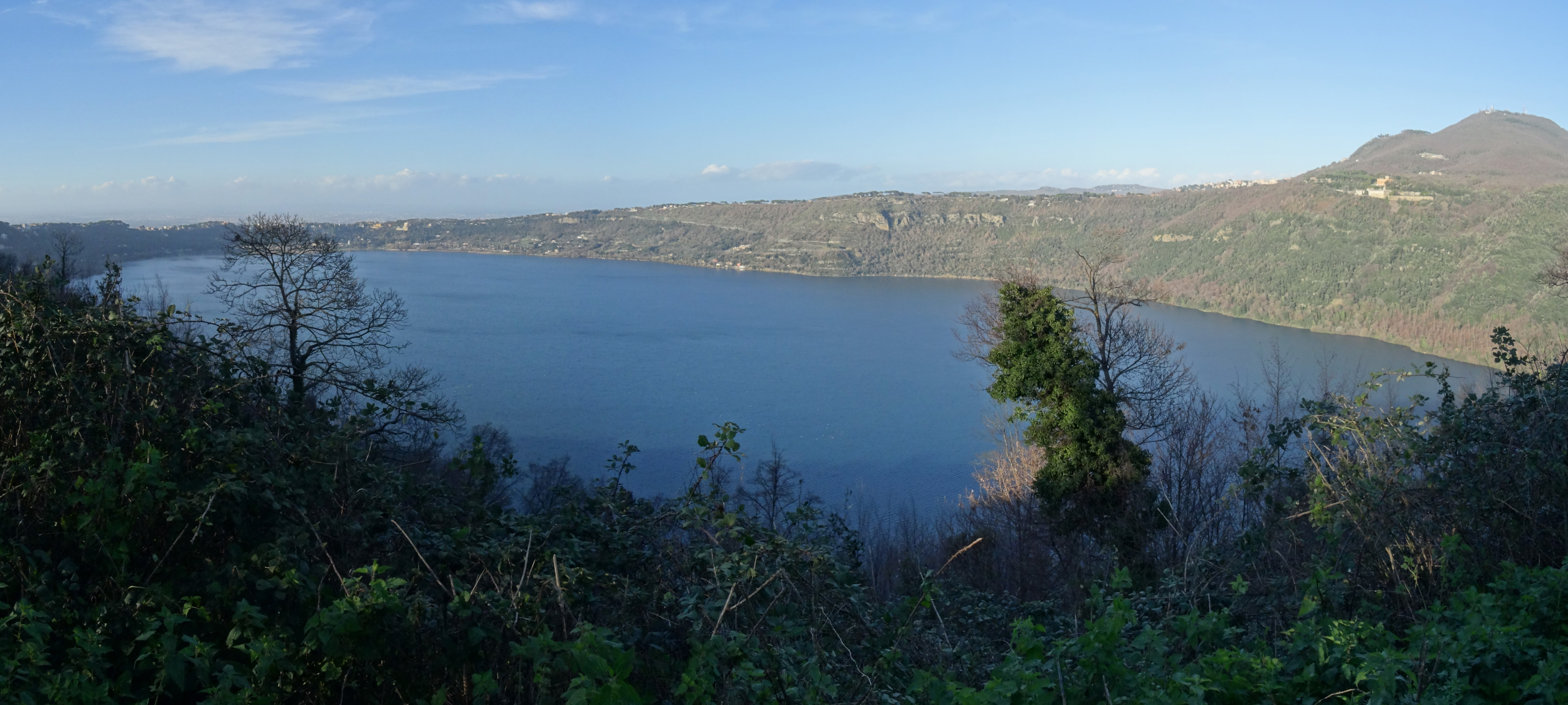
Lake Albano hosted canoeing at the 1960 Summer Olympics in Rome.

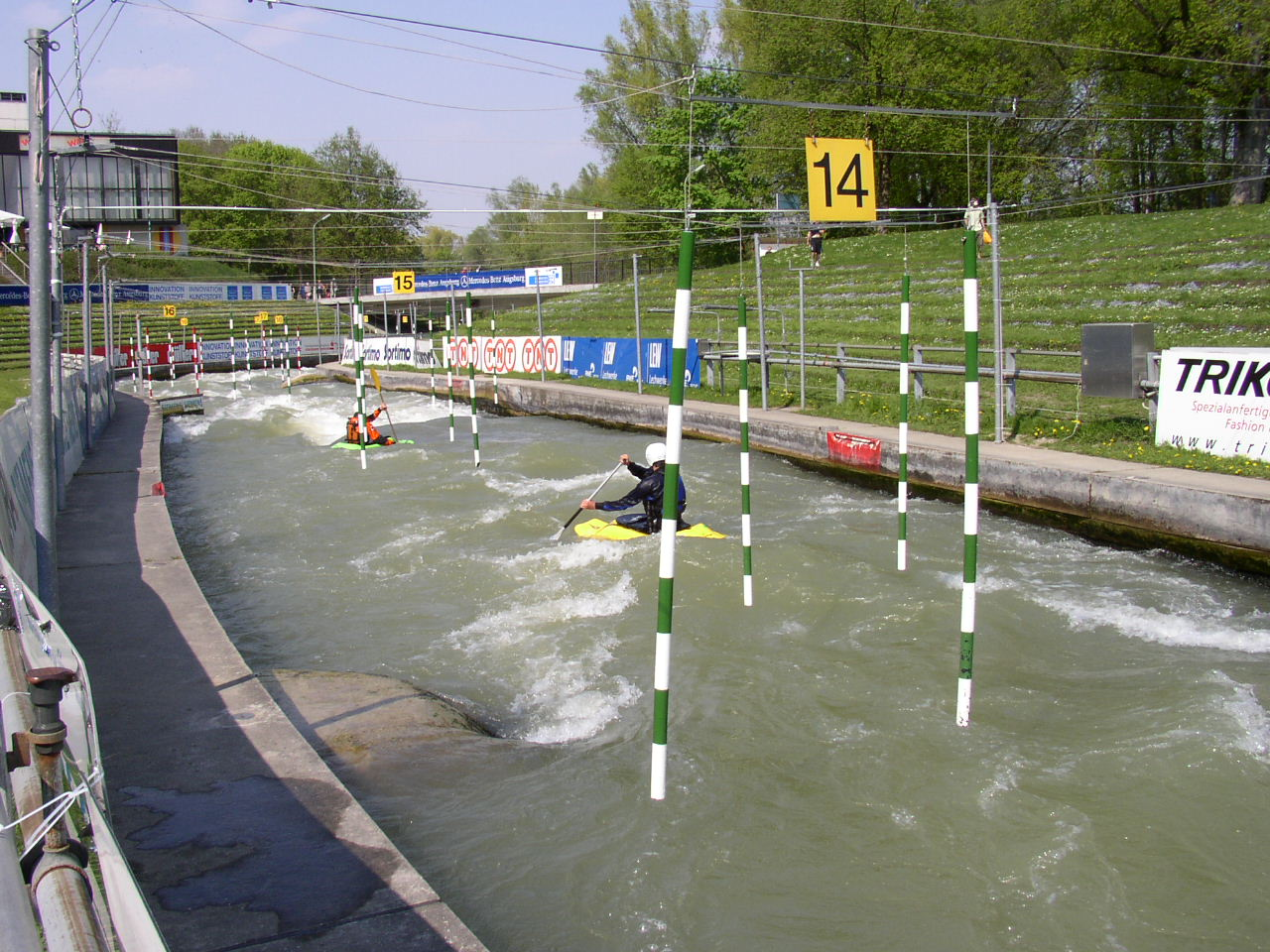
The Eiskanal in Augsburg hosted canoe slalom at the 1972 Summer Olympics in Munich.

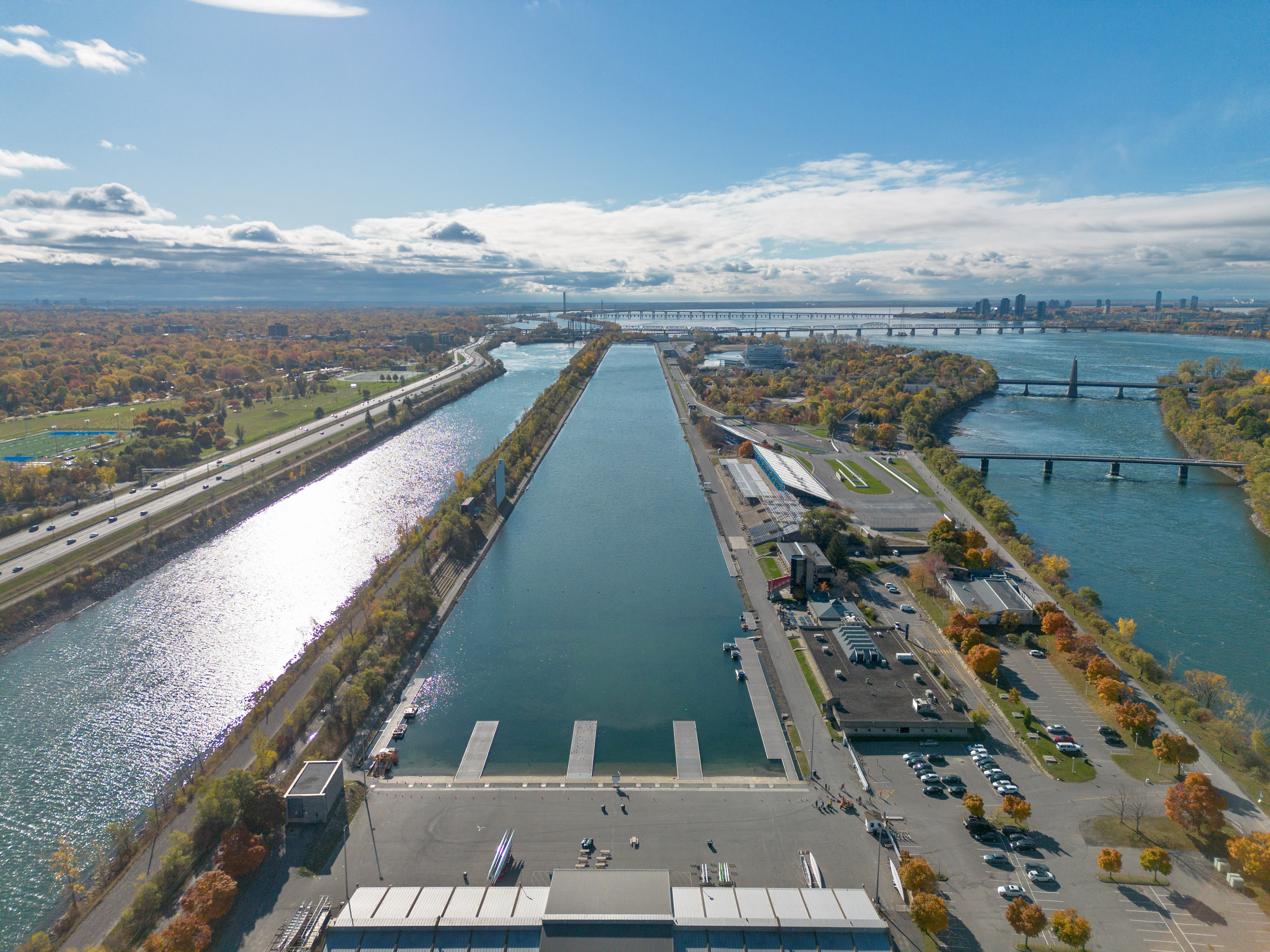
Notre Dame Island hosted canoeing at the 1976 Summer Olympics in Montreal.

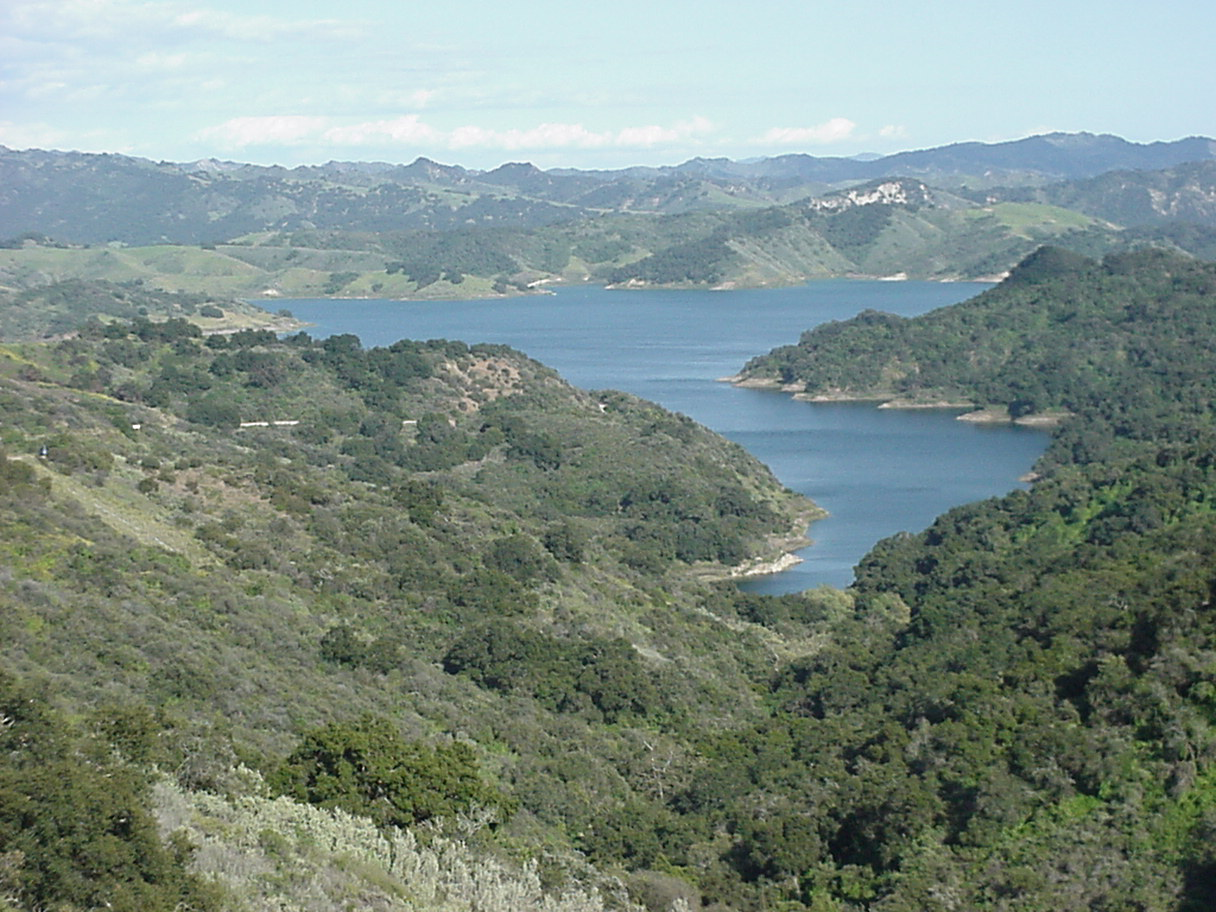
Lake Casitas hosted canoeing at the 1984 Summer Olympics in Los Angeles.

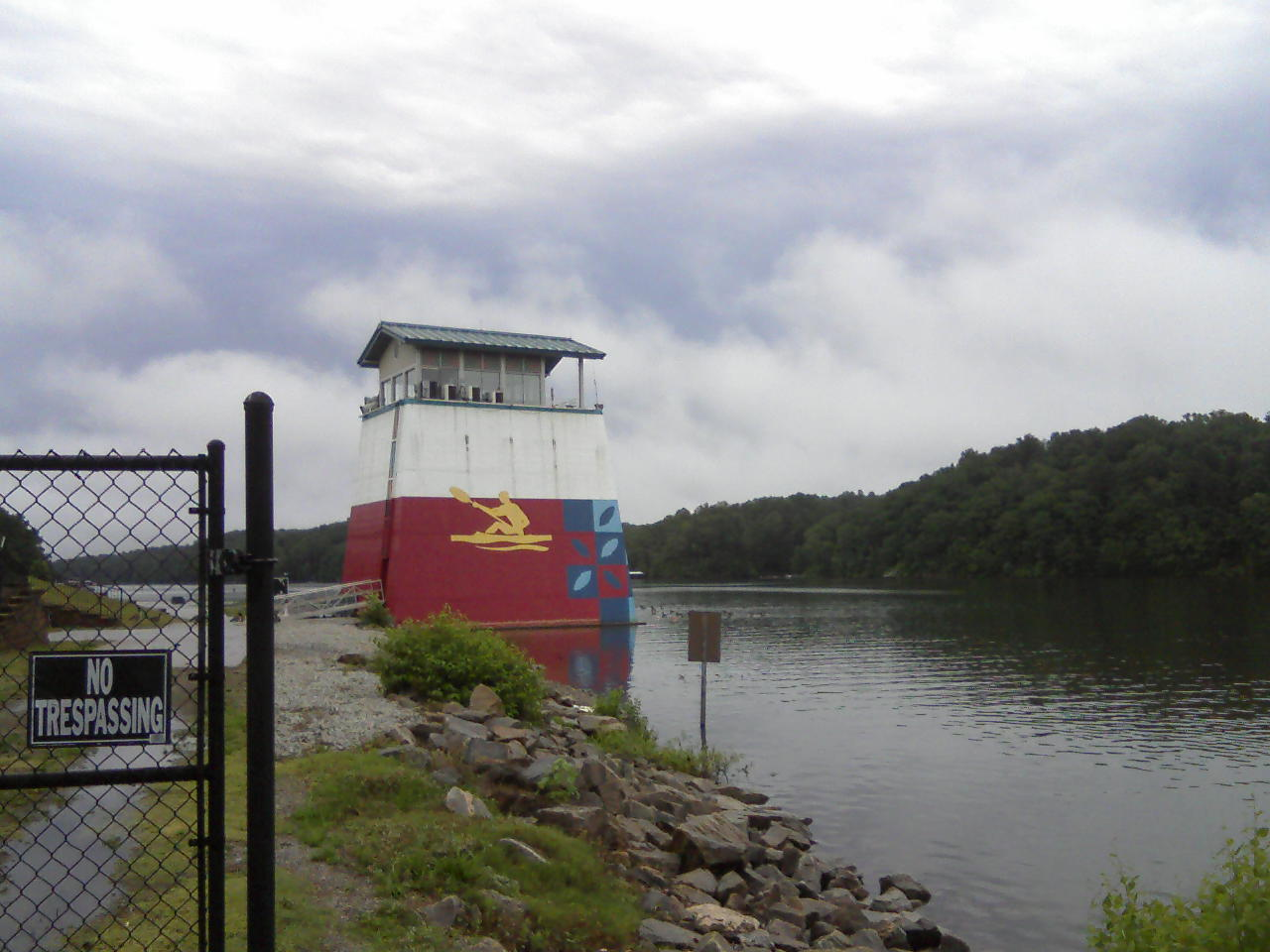
Lake Lanier hosted canoe sprint at the 1996 Summer Olympics in Atlanta.

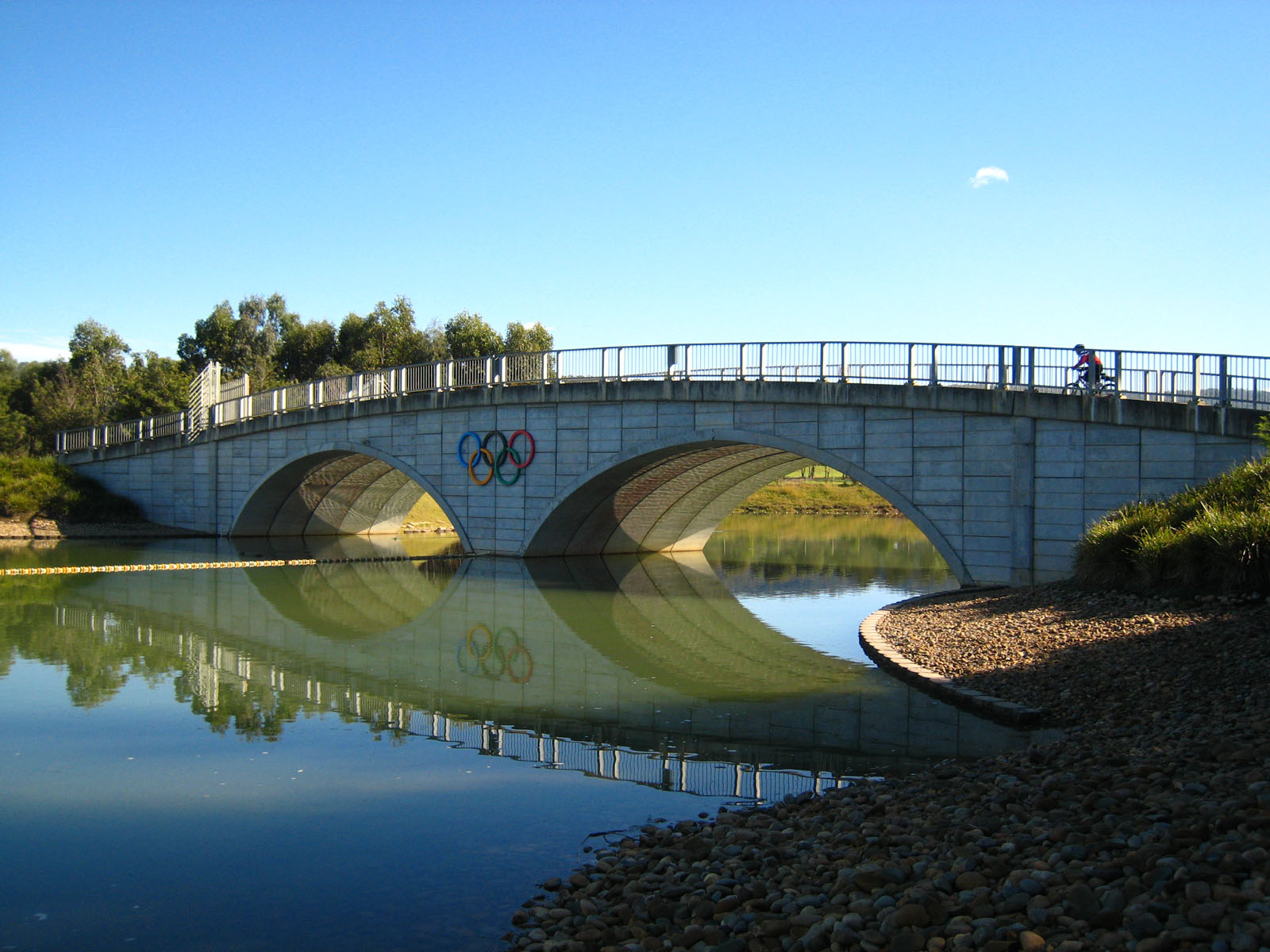
Sydney International Regatta Centre hosted canoe sprint at the 2000 Summer Olympics.

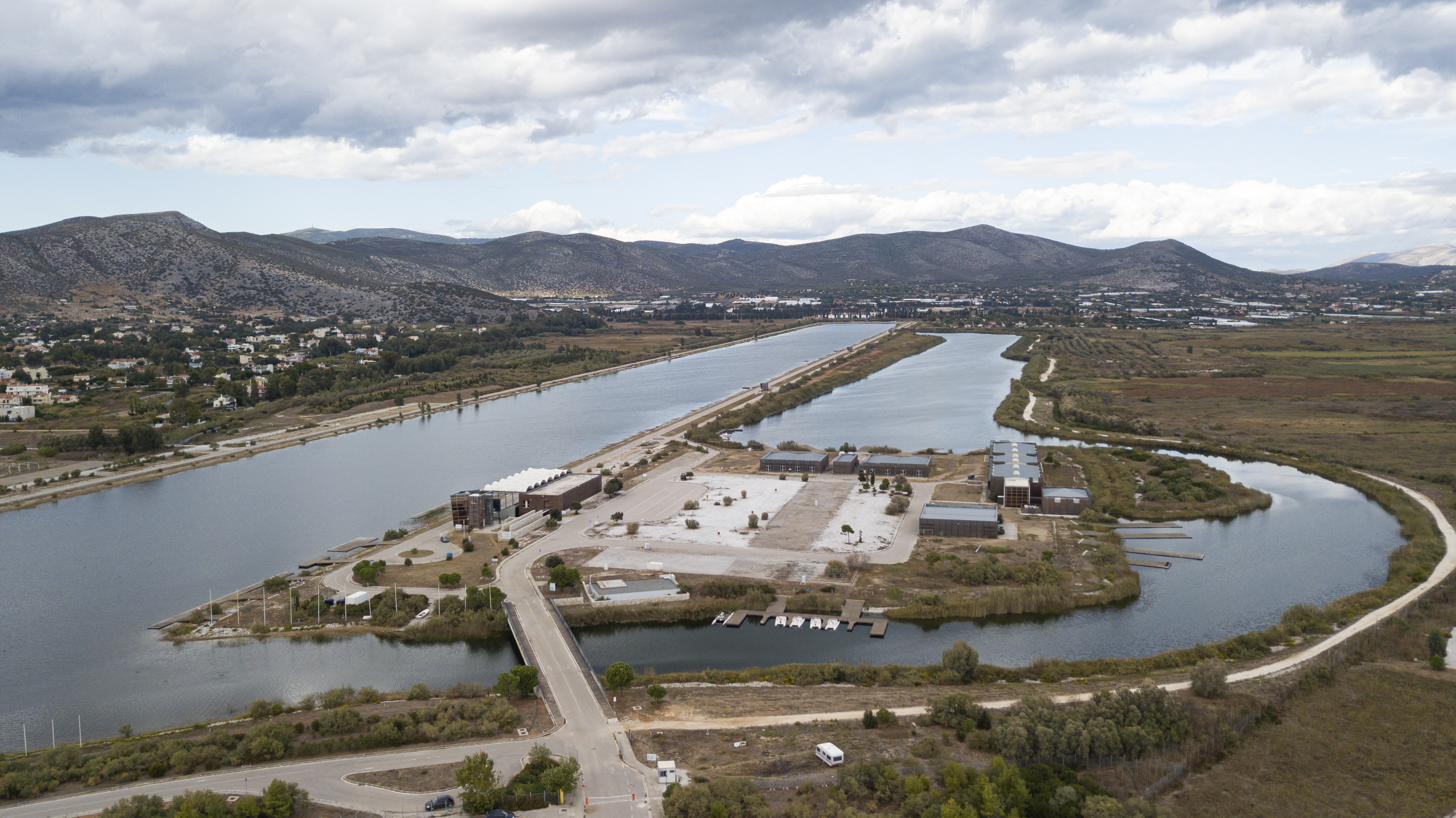
Schinias Olympic Rowing and Canoeing Centre hosted canoe sprint at the 2004 Summer Olympics in Athens.

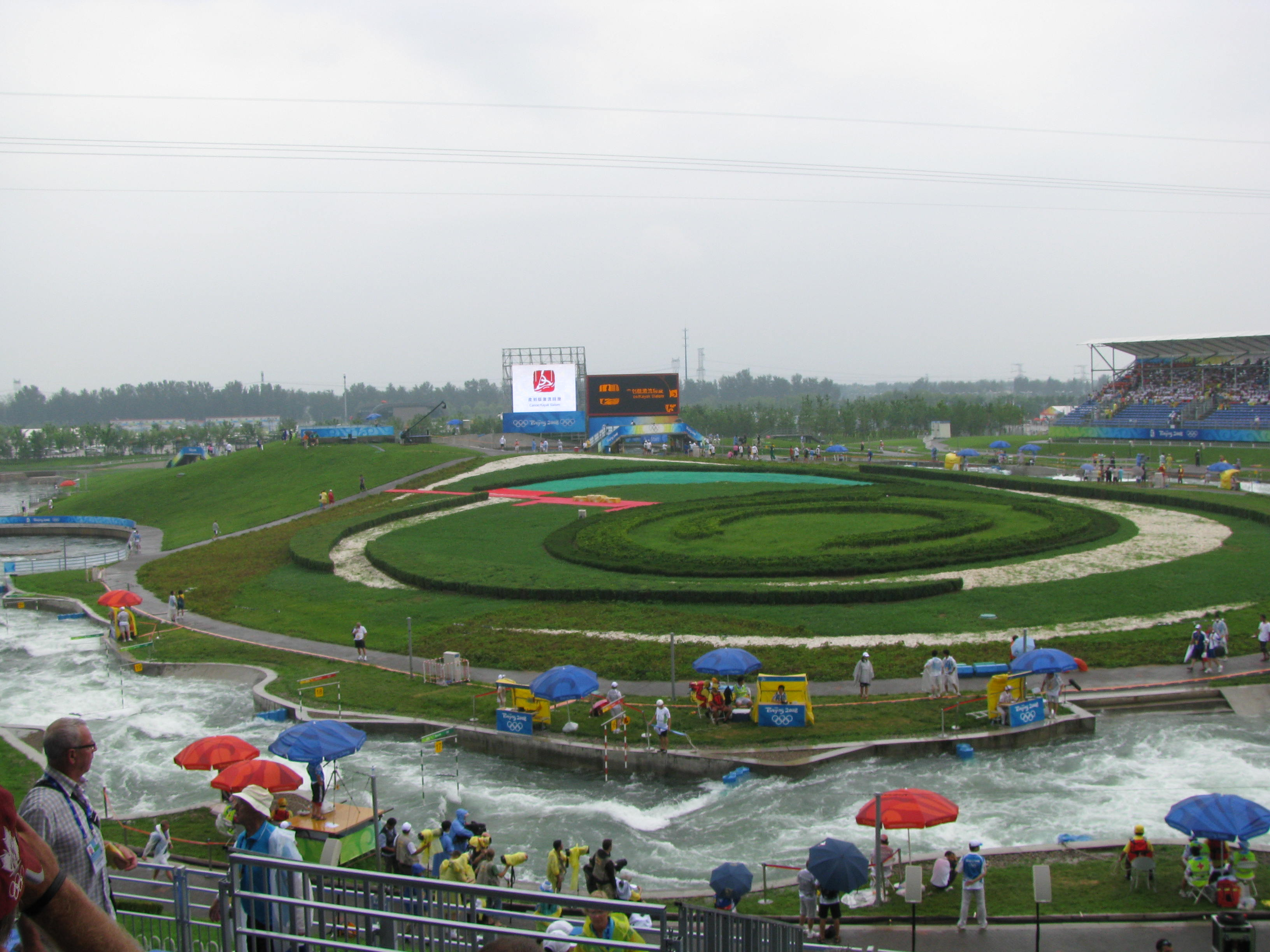
The Shunyi Olympic Rowing-Canoeing Park hosted canoeing at the 2008 Summer Olympics in Beijing.

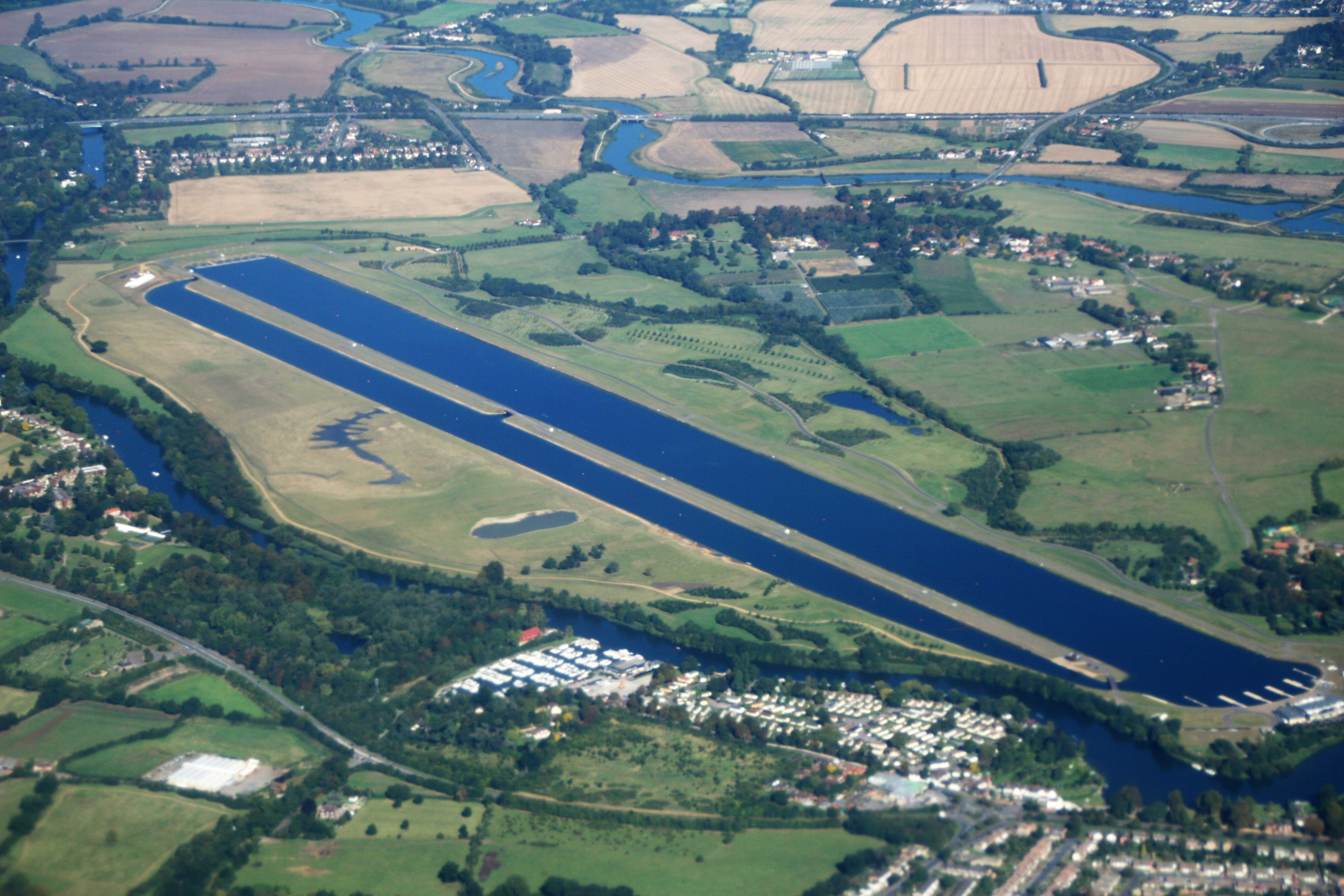
Dorney Lake hosted canoe sprint at the 2012 Summer Olympics in London.

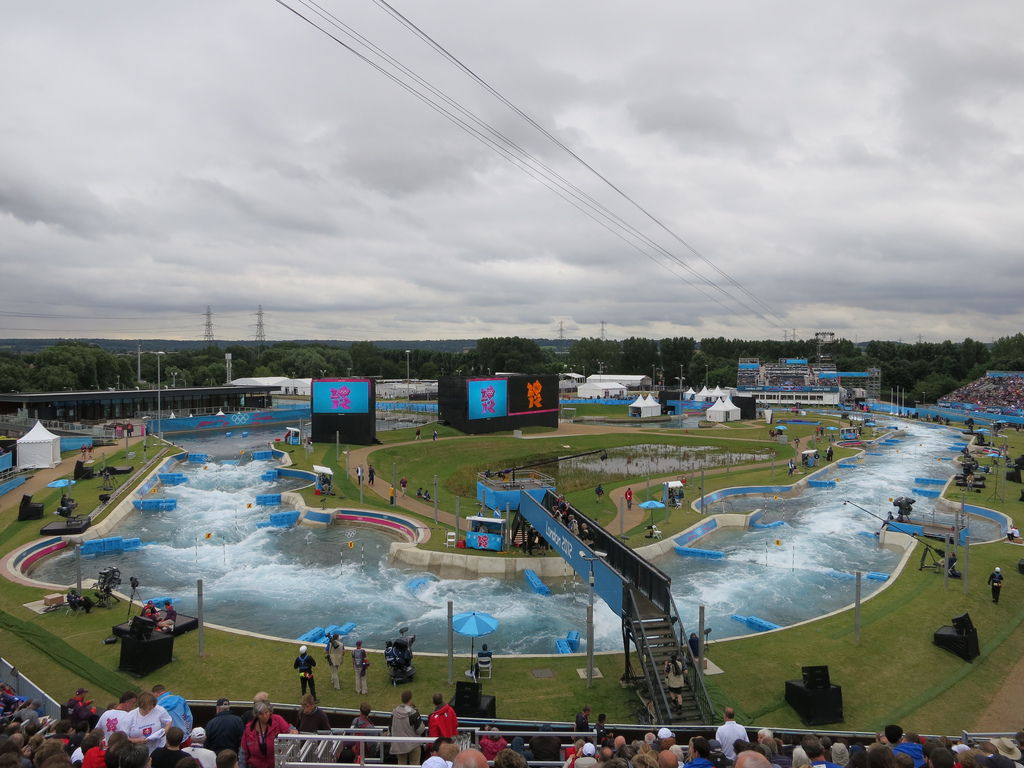
Lee Valley White Water Centre hosted canoe slalom at the 2012 Summer Olympics in London.

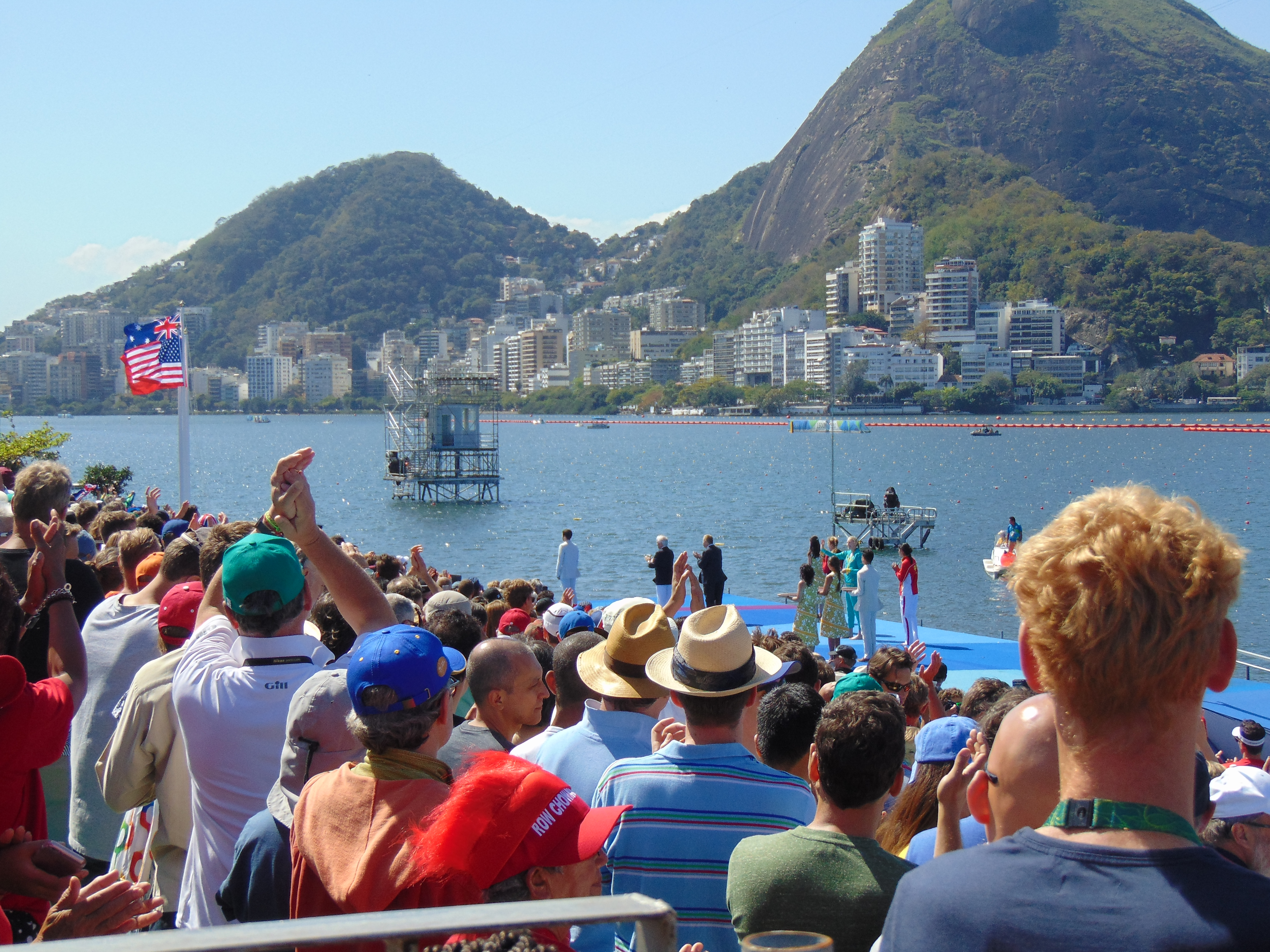
Rodrigo de Freitas Lagoon hosted canoe sprint at the 2016 Summer Olympics in Rio de Janeiro.

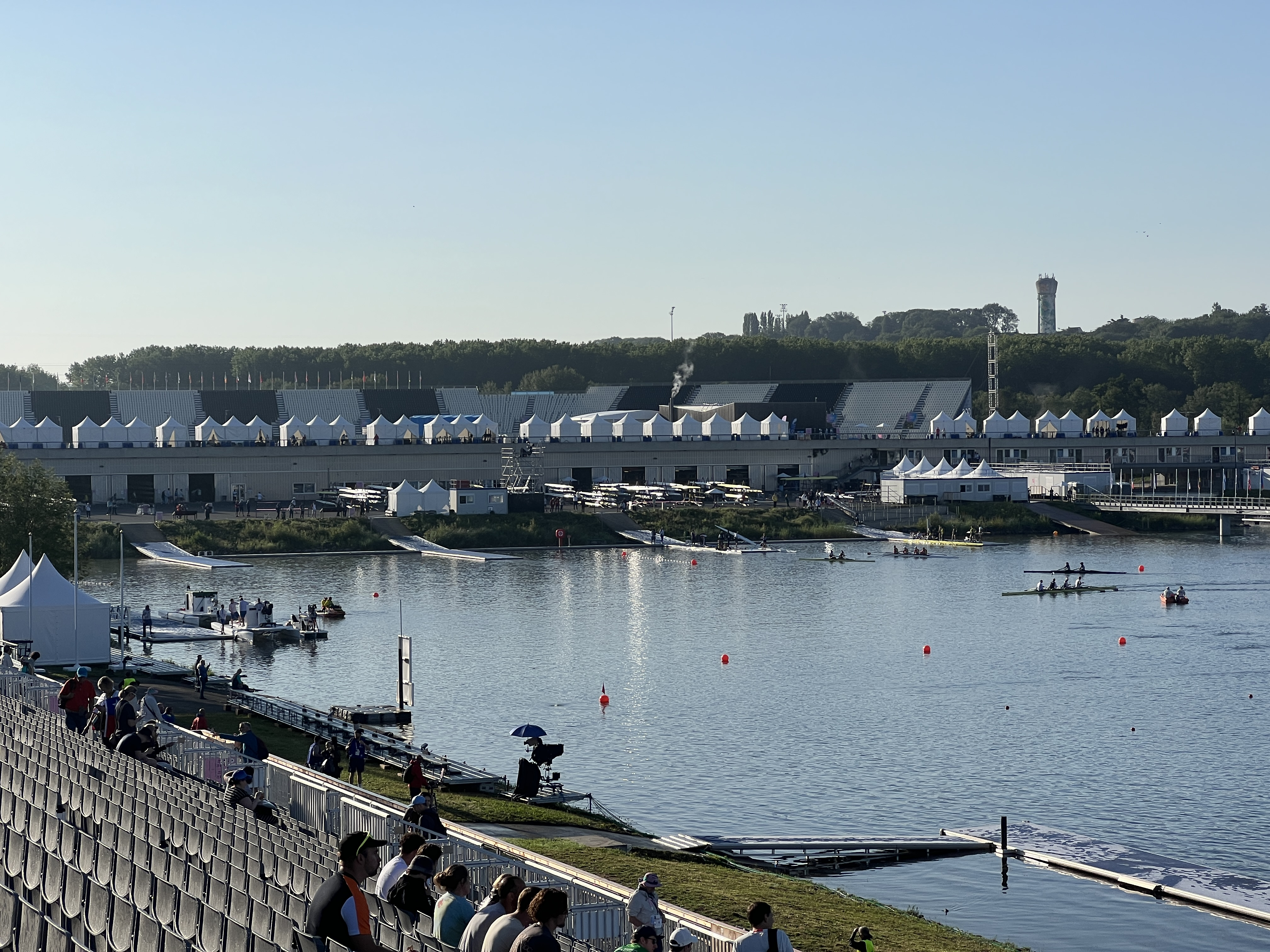
Vaires-sur-Marne Nautical Stadium hosted canoeing at the 2024 Summer Olympics in Paris.

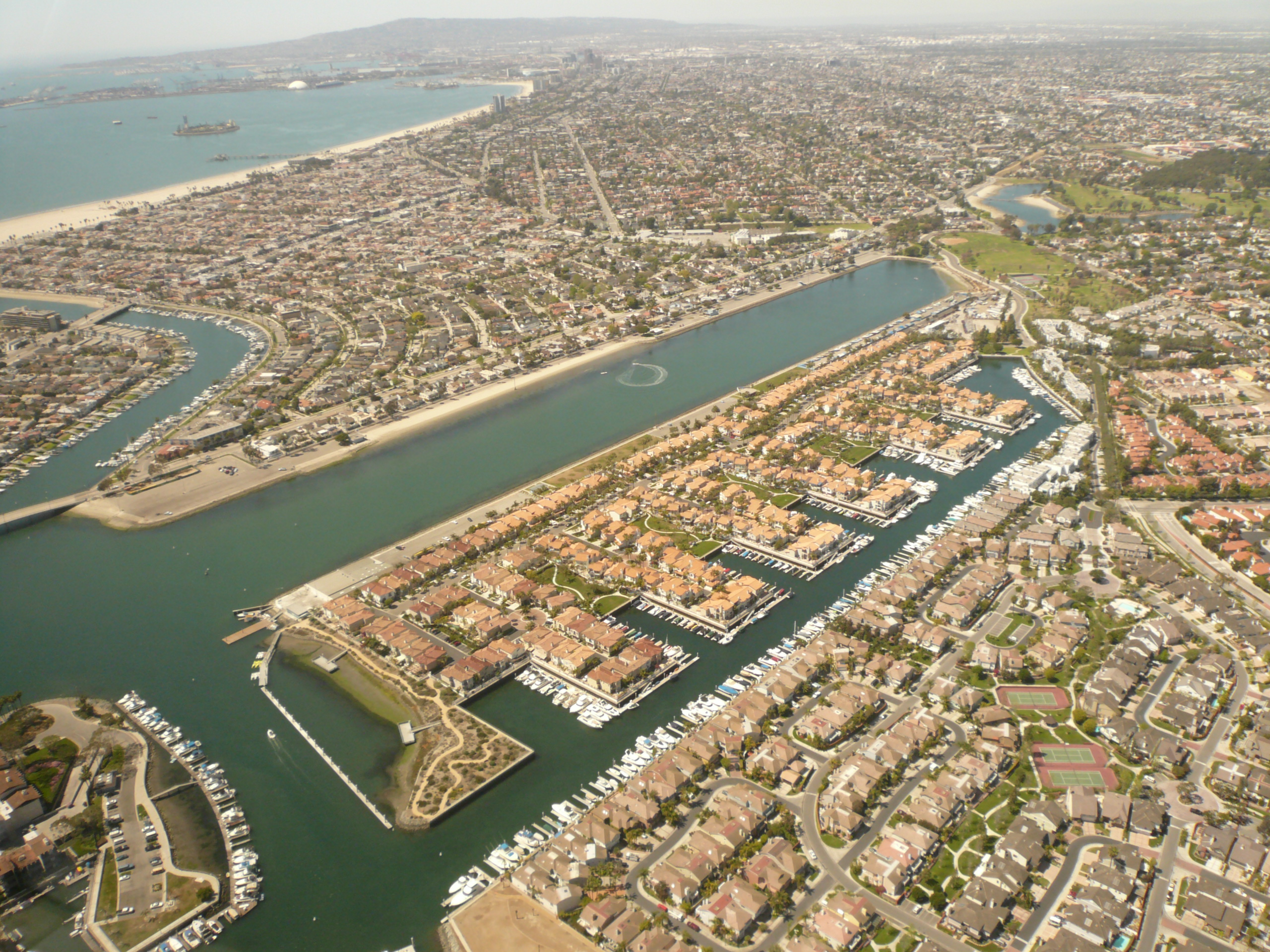
The Long Beach Marine Stadium will host canoe sprint at the 2028 Summer Olympics in Los Angeles.
