= Hans Rein =

Medal record

Men's canoe sprint

World Championships
Silver medal – second place	1938 Vaxholm	K-4 1000 m

Hans Rein was a German sprint canoeist who competed in the late 1930s. He won a silver medal in the K-4 1000 m event at the 1938 ICF Canoe Sprint World Championships in Vaxholm.
