= Göte Carlsson =

Swedish canoeist

Medal record

Men's canoe sprint

World Championships
Bronze medal – third place	1938 Vaxholm	K-4 1000 m

Göte Carlsson was a Swedish sprint canoeist who competed in the late 1930s. He won a bronze medal in the K-4 1000 m event at the 1938 ICF Canoe Sprint World Championships in Vaxholm.
