= Helmut Triebe =

Medal record

Men's canoe sprint

Representing Germany

World Championships
Gold medal – first place	1938 Vaxholm	K-2 1000 m
Silver medal – second place	1938 Vaxholm	K-2 10000 m

Helmut Triebe was a German sprint canoeist who competed in the late 1930s. He won two medals at the 1938 ICF Canoe Sprint World Championships in Vaxholm with a gold in the K-2 1000 m and a silver in the K-2 10000 m events.
