= Karl Proisl =

Medal record

Men's canoe sprint

Representing Austria

Olympic Games
Silver medal – second place	1936 Berlin	C-2 1000 m
Bronze medal – third place	1936 Berlin	C-2 10000 m

Representing Germany

World Championships
Gold medal – first place	1938 Vaxholm	C-2 1000 m
Silver medal – second place	1938 Vaxholm	C-2 10000 m

Karl Proisl (Traisen, 9 July 1911 – Beograd, 2 December 1949) was an Austrian sprint canoeist who competed in the 1930s.

At the 1936 Summer Olympics in Berlin, he won two medals with his partner Rupert Weinstabl: a silver in the C-2 1000 m event and a bronze in the C-2 10000 m event.

Proisl also won two medals at the 1938 ICF Canoe Sprint World Championships in Vaxholm: a gold in the C-2 1000 m event and silver in the C-2 10000 m event. He competed for Germany because it had annexed Austria at the time of the championships.
