= Bogren =

Bogren is a surname. Notable people with the surname include:

- Anna Bogren (born 1965), Swedish orienteering competitor
- Arne Bogren (fl. late 1930s), Swedish sprint canoeist
- Jens Bogren (born 1979), Swedish record producer
- Magnus Bogren (born 1972), Swedish ice hockey coach
