= Rupert Weinstabl =

Austrian canoeist (1911–1953)

Medal record

Men's canoe sprint

Representing Austria

Olympic Games
Silver medal – second place	1936 Berlin	C-2 1000 m
Bronze medal – third place	1936 Berlin	C-2 10000 m

Representing Germany

World Championships
Gold medal – first place	1938 Vaxholm	C-2 1000 m
Silver medal – second place	1938 Vaxholm	C-2 10000 m

Rupert Weinstabl (20 November 1911 – 7 September 1953) was an Austrian sprint canoeist who competed in the 1930s.

At the 1936 Summer Olympics in Berlin, he won two medals with his partner Karl Proisl with a silver in the C-2 1000 m and a bronze in the C-2 10000 m events.

Weinstabl also won two medals at the 1938 ICF Canoe Sprint World Championships in Vaxholm with a gold in the C-2 1000 m and silver in the C-2 10000 m events. He competed for Germany because it had annexed Austria at the time of the championships.
