= Hans Eberle =

Hans Eberle may refer to:

- Hans Eberle (canoeist) (fl. 1930s), German canoeist
- Hans Eberle (footballer) (1925–1998), German footballer
