= Marie Zvolánková =

Czechoslovak sprint canoeist

Medal record

Women's canoe sprint

World Championships
Gold medal – first place	1938 Vaxholm	K-2 600 m

Marie Zvolánková, née Pavlisová was a Czechoslovak sprint canoeist who competed in the late 1930s.

Together with her sister Marta Pavlisová, she won a gold medal in the K-2 600 m event at the 1938 ICF Canoe Sprint World Championships in Vaxholm.
