= Brüggemann =

Brüggemann is a German surname. Notable people with the surname include:

- Anna Brüggemann (born 1981), German actress and screenwriter
- Connor Bruggemann, American penny stock trader
- Friedrich Brüggemann (1850–1878), German zoologist
- Hans Brüggemann (ca. 1480–after 1521), German artist
- Heini Brüggemann (early 20th c.), German sprint canoeist
- Lisa Brüggemann (born 1984), German artistic gymnast
- Magda Bruggemann (mid 20th c.), Mexican Olympic swimmer
- Michael Brüggemann (1583–1654), German Lutheran pastor
- Theodor Brüggemann (1796–1866), Prussian school teacher, government official and politician

== See also ==
- Walter Brueggemann (1933–2025), American Protestant Old Testament scholar and theologian
