= Sobieraj (surname) =

Sobieraj is a Polish surname. It may refer to:

- Czesław Sobieraj (1914–1985), Polish sprint canoeist
- Krzysztof Sobieraj (born 1981), Polish football manager
- Małgorzata Sobieraj (born 1982), Polish archer
