= Treinen =

Treinen is a surname. Notable people with the surname include:

- Blake Treinen (born 1988), American baseball pitcher
- Joé Treinen (1911–1982), Luxembourgian canoeist
- Sylvester William Treinen (1917–1996), American Roman Catholic bishop
- Tom Treinen (born 1943), American sports shooter
