= Schorn =

Schorn is a surname. Notable people with the surname include:

- Albert Schorn, German sprint canoeist
- Christine Schorn (born 1944), German actress
- Daniel Schorn (born 1988), Austrian road bicycle racer
- Karl Schorn (1803–1850), German painter and chess player
- Steffen Schorn (born 1967), German jazz musician
