= Otto Neumüller =

Austrian canoeist

Medal record

Men's canoe sprint

Representing Germany

World Championships
Gold medal – first place	1938 Vaxholm	C-1 1000 m

Otto Neumüller (born 9 November 1908 in Altenfelden; date of death unknown) was an Austrian sprint canoeist who competed in the late 1930s. He won a gold medal in the C-1 1000 m event at the 1938 ICF Canoe Sprint World Championships in Vaxholm, Sweden.

Neumüller also competed at the 1936 Summer Olympics in Berlin, finishing fourth in the C-1 1000 m event.
