= Johann Fuchs =

German canoeist

Sport
- Sport: Kayaking
- Event: Folding kayak
Medal record
Men's canoe sprint
Representing Germany
World Championships
Bronze medal – third place	1938 Vaxholm	K-2 10000 m folding

Johann Fuchs was a German sprint canoeist who competed in the late 1930s. He won a bronze medal in the folding K-2 10000 m event at the 1938 ICF Canoe Sprint World Championships in Vaxholm.
