= Heinz Jürgens =

Medal record

Men's canoe sprint

Representing Germany

World Championships
Bronze medal – third place	1938 Vaxholm	C-2 10000 m

Heinz Jürgens was a German sprint canoeist who competed in the late 1930s. He won a bronze medal in the C-2 10000 m event at the 1938 ICF Canoe Sprint World Championships in Vaxholm.
