= Erich Koschik =

German flatwater canoeist (1913–1985)

Olympic medal record

Men's flatwater canoeing
Bronze medal – third place	1936 Berlin	C-1 1000 m

Erich Koschik (3 January 1913 - 21 July 1985) was a German flatwater canoeist who competed in the late 1930s. At the 1936 Summer Olympics in Berlin, he won a bronze medal in the C-1 1000 m event.
