= Berndt Berndtsson =

Swedish canoeist

Medal record

Men's canoe sprint

Representing Sweden

World Championships
Gold medal – first place	1938 Vaxholm	K-2 10000 m
Bronze medal – third place	1938 Vaxholm	K-4 1000 m

Berndt Berndtsson was a Swedish sprint canoeist who competed in the late 1930s. He won two medals at the 1938 ICF Canoe Sprint World Championships in Vaxholm with a gold in the K-2 10000 m and a bronze in the K-4 1000 m events.
