= Kamill Balatoni =

Hungarian canoeist

Medal record

Men's canoe sprint

Representing Hungary

World Championships
Silver medal – second place	1938 Vaxholm	K-1 10000 m folding

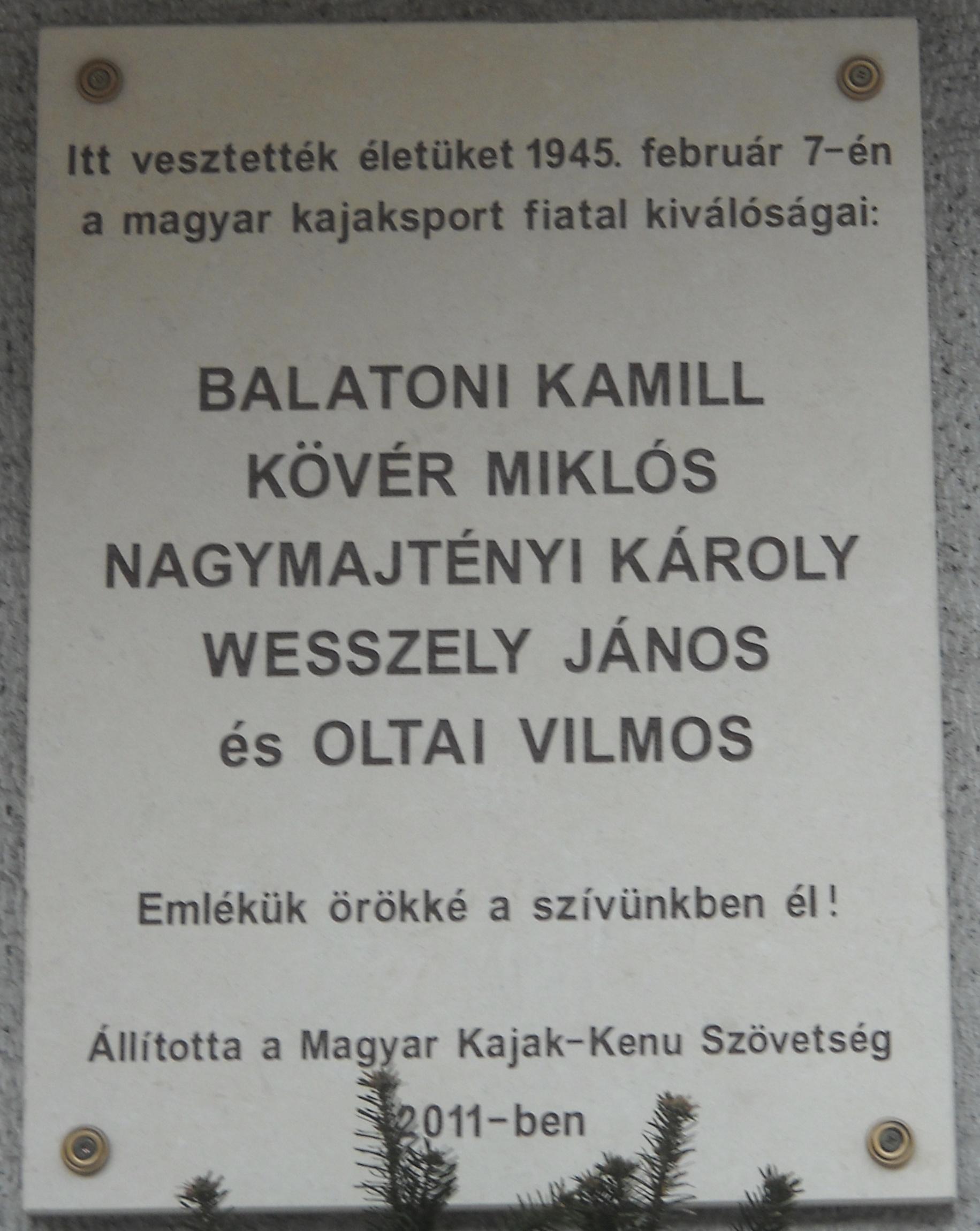
Commemorative plaque of Kamill Balatoni, and others in Budapest District II, Csalogány Street No 9-11

Kamill Balatoni (1912 – 7 February 1945) was a Hungarian sprint canoeist who competed in the late 1930s. He won a silver medal in the K-1 10000 m folding event at the 1938 ICF Canoe Sprint World Championships in Vaxholm. During the Second World War, he served in the Hungarian Resistance, but was captured by the SS and shot along with two others.
