= Elisabeth Kropp =

German canoeist

Medal record

Women's canoe sprint

World Championships
Silver medal – second place	1938 Vaxholm	K-2 600 m

Elisabeth Kropp is a German sprint canoeist who competed in the late 1930s. She won a silver medal in the K-2 600 m event at the 1938 ICF Canoe Sprint World Championships in Vaxholm.
