= Reidel =

Reidel may refer to:

- D. Reidel, a Dutch publishing company
- Reidel Anthony (born 1976), American football player
- Gorjana Reidel (born 1978), American jewelry designer
- Josef Reidel, German canoeist
- Marlene Reidel (1923–2014), German artist

== See also ==
- Riedel
- United States v. Reidel
