= Poul Larsen =

Danish canoeist (1916–1990)

Medal record

Men's canoe sprint

Representing Denmark

World Championships
Bronze medal – third place	1938 Vaxholm	K-2 1000 m

Poul Larsen (August 21, 1916 – July 15, 1990) was a Danish sprint canoeist who competed in the late 1930s. He won a bronze in the K-2 1000 m event at the 1938 ICF Canoe Sprint World Championships in Vaxholm.

Larsen also competed at the 1936 Summer Olympics in Berlin in the K-1 1000 m event, but did not advance to the final.
