= Walter Schuur =

German canoeist (1910–2005)

Walter Schuur (14 December 1910 – 12 March 2005) was a German canoeist, born in Hamburg, who competed in the 1936 Summer Olympics. In 1936 he finished fourth together with his partner Christian Holzenberg in the C-2 10000 metre event.
