= Marta Pavlisová =

Medal record

Women's canoe sprint

World Championships
Gold medal – first place	1938 Vaxholm	K-2 600 m
Silver medal – second place	1948 London	K-2 500 m

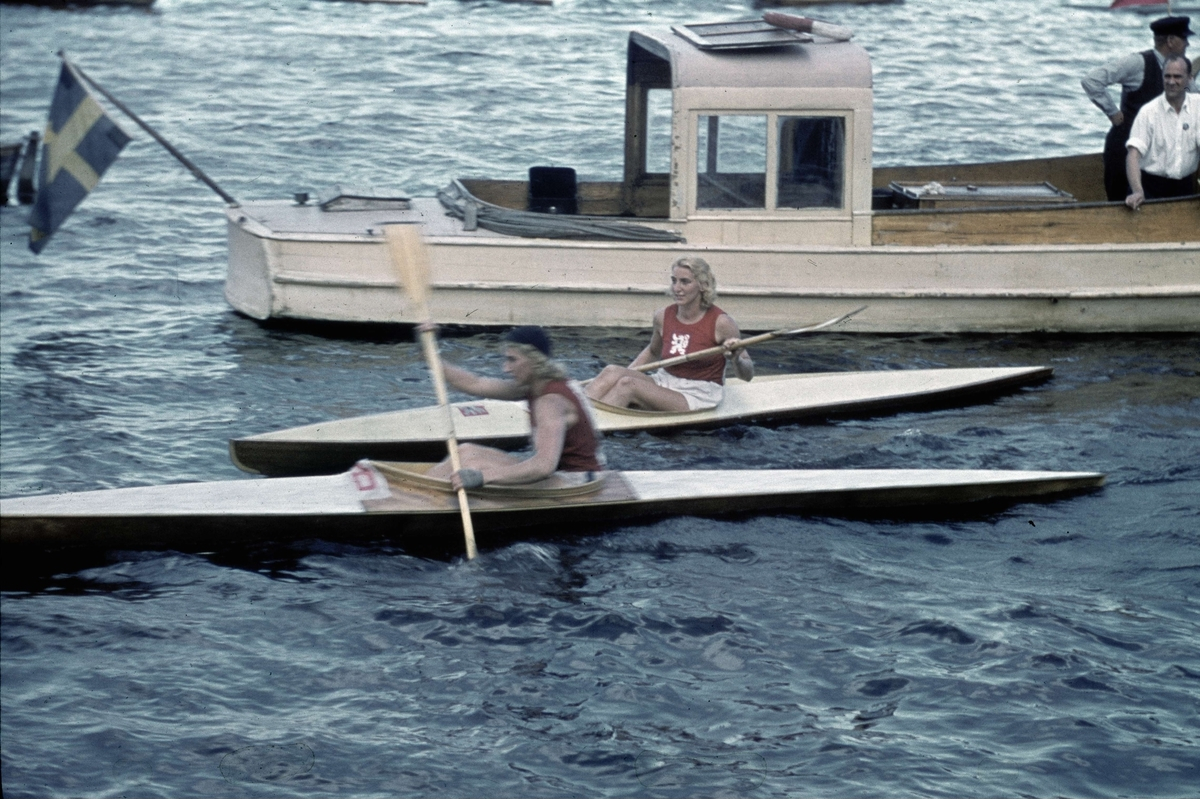
The Pavlis sisters, Czechoslovakia: 1938 ICF Canoe Sprint World Championships, 1938

Marta Pavlisová, married Marta Kohoutová (29 July 1914 – 1953) was a Czechoslovak sprint canoer who competed in the 1930s and 1940s.

Together with her sister, Marie Zvolánková, born Pavlisová, she won a gold medal in the K-2 600 m event at the 1938 ICF Canoe Sprint World Championships in Vaxholm.

Later she married, changing her family name to Pavlisová-Kohoutová.

Under a new name, she won a silver medal in the K-2 500 m event at the 1948 ICF Canoe Sprint World Championships in London.
