= Václav Mottl =

Medal record

Men's canoe sprint

Representing Czechoslovakia

Olympic Games
Gold medal – first place	1936 Berlin	C-2 10000 m

World Championships
Bronze medal – third place	1938 Vaxholm	C-2 1000 m

Václav Mottl (19 May 1914 – 16 June 1982) was a Czech sprint canoeist who competed in the late 1930s, representing Czechoslovakia. He won a gold medal in the C-2 10000 m event at the 1936 Summer Olympics in Berlin.

Mottl also won a bronze medal in the C-2 1000 m event at the 1938 ICF Canoe Sprint World Championships in Vaxholm.

He was born and died in Prague.
