= Gunnar Johansson (canoeist) =

Swedish canoeist (1919–1998)

Medal record

Men's canoe sprint

Representing Sweden

World Championships
Gold medal – first place	1938 Vaxholm	K-2 10000 m
Bronze medal – third place	1938 Vaxholm	K-4 1000 m

Gunnar Johansson (23 March 1919 – 11 December 1998) was a Swedish sprint canoeist who competed from the late 1930s to the late 1940s. He won two medals at the 1938 ICF Canoe Sprint World Championships in Vaxholm with a gold in the K-2 10000 m and a bronze in the K-4 1000 m events.

Johannsson also competed at the 1948 Summer Olympics in the C-2 1000 m and C-2 10000 m events, finishing sixth in both.
