= Bohumil Sládek =

Czechoslovak canoeist

Medal record

Men's canoe sprint

Representing Czechoslovakia

World Championships
Bronze medal – third place	1938 Vaxholm	C-1 1000 m

Bohumil Sládek was a Czechoslovak sprint canoeist who competed in the late 1930s. He won a bronze medal in the C-1 1000 m event at the 1938 ICF Canoe Sprint World Championships in Vaxholm, Sweden.
