= Zdeněk Škrland =

Czechoslovak sprint canoeist

Medal record

Men's canoe sprint

Representing Czechoslovakia

Olympic Games
Gold medal – first place	1936 Berlin	C-2 10000 m

World Championships
Bronze medal – third place	1938 Vaxholm	C-2 1000 m

Zdeněk Škrland (6 February 1914 – 6 March 1996) was a Czechoslovak sprint canoeist who competed in the late 1930s. He won a gold medal in the C-2 10000 m event at the 1936 Summer Olympics in Berlin.

Škrland also won a bronze medal in the C-2 1000 m event at the 1938 ICF Canoe Sprint World Championships in Vaxholm.

He was born and died in Prague.
