= Hans Wiedemann =

Medal record

Men's canoe sprint

Representing Germany

World Championships
Silver medal – second place	1938 Vaxholm	C-1 1000 m

Hans Wiedemann was a German sprint canoeist who competed in the late 1930s. He won a silver medal in the C-1 1000 m event at the 1938 ICF Canoe Sprint World Championships in Vaxholm, Sweden.
