= Karl Maurer =

Medal record

Men's canoe sprint

World Championships
Bronze medal – third place	1938 Vaxholm	K-2 10000 m

Karl Maurer was a German sprint canoeist who competed in the late 1930s. He won a bronze medal in the K-2 10000 m event at the 1938 ICF Canoe Sprint World Championships in Vaxholm.
