= Günter Nowatzki =

Medal record

Men's canoe sprint

Representing Germany

World Championships
Bronze medal – third place	1938 Vaxholm	K-1 10000 m folding

Günter Nowatzki is a German sprint canoeist who competed in the late 1930s. He won a bronze medal in the K-1 10000 m folding event at the 1938 ICF Canoe Sprint World Championships in Vaxholm.
