= Karl Widmark =

Swedish canoeist (1911–1995)

Medal record

Men's canoe sprint

Representing Sweden

World Championships
| Gold medal – first place | 1938 Vaxholm | K-1 1000 m |
| Gold medal – first place | 1938 Vaxholm | K-1 10000 m |

Karl Widmark (June 16, 1911 – October 14, 1995) was a Swedish sprint canoeist competing for Västerås canoeing club in the late 1930s. He won two gold medals at the 1938 ICF Canoe Sprint World Championships in Vaxholm, earning them in the K-1 1000 m and K-1 10000 m events.
