= Carl-Gustav Hellstrandt =

Swedish canoeist

Medal record

Men's canoe sprint

World Championships
Gold medal – first place	1938 Vaxholm	K-2 10000 m folding

Carl-Gustav Hellstrandt was a Swedish sprint canoeist who competed in the late 1930s. He won a gold medal in the K-2 10000 m folding event at the 1938 ICF Canoe Sprint World Championships in Vaxholm.
