= Ruth Lange =

Ruth Lange may refer to:

- Ruth Lange (athlete) (1908–1994), German shot putter and discus thrower
- Ruth Lange (canoeist) (fl. 1938), Danish sprint canoeist
