= Maj-Britt Bergqvist =

Swedish canoeist

Medal record

Women's canoe sprint

World Championships
Silver medal – second place	1938 Vaxholm	K-1 600 m

Maj-Britt Bergqvist was a Swedish sprint canoeist who competed in the late 1930s. She won a silver medal in the K-1 600m event at the 1938 ICF Canoe Sprint World Championships in Vaxholm.
