= Maggie Kalka =

Finnish canoeist and fencer

Medal record

Women's canoe sprint

World Championships
Gold medal – first place	1938 Vaxholm	K-1 600 m

Maggie Kalka (October 20, 1912 – July 22, 1996) was a Finnish sprint canoeist who competed in the late 1930s. She won a gold medal in the K-1 600 m event at the 1938 ICF Canoe Sprint World Championships in Vaxholm.

Kalka also competed as a fencer at the 1952 Summer Olympics in Helsinki, but was eliminated in the heats of the women's foil event.
