= Vagn Jørgensen =

Danish canoeist

Medal record

Men's canoe sprint

Representing Denmark

World Championships
Bronze medal – third place	1938 Vaxholm	K-2 1000 m

Vagn Jørgensen was a Danish sprint canoeist who competed in the late 1930s. He won a bronze in the K-2 1000 m event at the 1938 ICF Canoe Sprint World Championships in Vaxholm.
