= Heini Brüggemann =

German canoeist

Medal record

Men's canoe sprint

World Championships
Gold medal – first place	1938 Vaxholm	K-4 1000 m

Heini Brüggemann was a German sprint canoeist who competed in the late 1930s. He won a gold medal in the K-4 1000 m event at the 1938 ICF Canoe Sprint World Championships in Vaxholm.
