= Arne Bogren =

Swedish sprint canoeist

Medal record

Men's canoe sprint

Representing Sweden

World Championships
Gold medal – first place	1938 Vaxholm	K-1 10000 m folding

Arne Bogren is a Swedish sprint canoeist who competed for Brunnsviken's canoeing club in the late 1930s. He won a gold medal in the K-1 10000 m folding event at the 1938 ICF Canoe Sprint World Championships in Vaxholm.
