= Canoeing at the 1936 Summer Olympics – Men's C-2 10000 metres =

These are the results of the Men's C-2 10000 metres competition in canoeing at the 1936 Summer Olympics. The C-2 event is raced by two-man sprint canoes. The race took place on Friday, August 7.

Ten canoeists from five nations competed.

== Medalists ==
Gold	Silver	Bronze
Václav Mottl and Zdeněk Škrland (TCH)	Frank Saker and Harvey Charters (CAN)	Rupert Weinstabl and Karl Proisl (AUT)

== Final ==
With only five teams competing, a final was held.

Place	Canoeists	Time
1	Václav Mottl and Zdeněk Škrland (TCH)	50:33.5
2	Frank Saker and Harvey Charters (CAN)	51:15.8
3	Rupert Weinstabl and Karl Proisl (AUT)	51:28.0
4	Walter Schuur and Christian Holzenberg (GER)	52:35.6
5	Joseph Hasenfus and Walter Hasenfus (USA)	57:06.2
