= Ruth Lange (canoeist) =

Danish canoeist

Medal record

Women's canoe sprint

World Championships
Bronze medal – third place	1938 Vaxholm	K-2 600 m

Ruth Lange is a Danish sprint canoeist who competed in the late 1930s.

== Professional career ==
She won a bronze medal in the K-2 600 m event at the 1938 ICF Canoe Sprint World Championships in Vaxholm.
