= Christian Holzenberg =

German canoeist

Medal record

Men's canoe sprint

Representing Germany

World Championships
Bronze medal – third place	1938 Vaxholm	C-2 10000 m

Christian Holzenberg (2 January 1910 – 27 February 1942) was a German sprint canoeist who competed in the late 1930s. He won a bronze medal in the C-2 10000 m event at the 1938 ICF Canoe Sprint World Championships in Vaxholm. Holzengerg also finished fourth in the C-2 10000 m event at the 1936 Summer Olympics in Berlin.

He was killed in action during World War II.

== Sources ==
- Christian Holzenberg's profile at Sports Reference.com
