= Czesław Sobieraj =

Medal record

Men's canoe sprint

Representing Poland

World Championships
Silver medal – second place	1938 Vaxholm	K-1 10000 m

Czesław Sobieraj (17 July 1914 – 25 July 1985) was a Polish sprint canoeist who competed from the late 1930s to the late 1940s. He won a silver medal in the K-1 10000 m event at the 1938 ICF Canoe Sprint World Championships in Vaxholm.

Sobieraj also competed at the 1948 Summer Olympics in London, finishing seventh in the K-1 10000 m event while being eliminated in the semifinals of the K-1 1000 m event.
