= Joseph Hasenfus =

American canoeist

Joseph Louis Hasenfus (May 29, 1913 – August 20, 1999) was an American canoeist who competed in the 1936 Summer Olympics.

He was born in Needham, Massachusetts and died in Brunswick, Maine. He was the older brother of Walter Hasenfus.

In 1936 he finished fifth in the C-1 1000 metre competition as well as fifth together with his brother Walter in the C-2 10000 metre event.

Later he was assistant director of Safety Services for Small Craft Safety for the American National Red Cross. In 1956 he wrote the Red Cross 445 page textbook, "Canoeing."
