= Canoeing at the 1936 Summer Olympics – Men's C-1 1000 metres =

Men's canoe sprint C-1 1000m at the Games of the XI Olympiad
- Venue: Langer See, Grünau
- Date: 8 August
- Competitors: 6 from 6 nations
- Winning time: 5:32.1

Medalists
1st place, gold medalist(s)		Frank Amyot	Canada
2nd place, silver medalist(s)		Bohuslav Karlík	Czechoslovakia
3rd place, bronze medalist(s)		Erich Koschik	Germany

These are the results of the men's C-1 1000 metres competition in canoeing at the 1936 Summer Olympics. The C-1 event is raced by single-man sprint canoes and took place on Saturday, August 8.

Six canoeists from six nations competed.

== Competition format ==
With only six competitors in the event, a final was held.

== Results ==
=== Final ===
Rank	Canoer	Country	Time	Notes
1st place, gold medalist(s)	Frank Amyot	Canada	5:32.1	
2nd place, silver medalist(s)	Bohuslav Karlík	Czechoslovakia	5:36.9	
3rd place, bronze medalist(s)	Erich Koschik	Germany	5:39.0	
4	Otto Neumüller	Austria	5:47.0	
5	Joseph Hasenfus	United States	6:02.6	
6	Joé Treinen	Luxembourg	7:39.5	
