= Walter Hasenfus =

American canoeist

Walter Martin Hasenfus (March 18, 1916 – December 8, 1944) was an American canoeist who competed in the 1936 Summer Olympics.

He was born in Needham, Massachusetts and is the younger brother of Joseph Hasenfus.

In 1936, he finished fifth together with his brother Joseph in the C-2 10000 metre event.

He was killed in action during World War II, while serving with the 307th Infantry, 77th Division in the South Pacific, most likely in the Philippines.
