= 1938 ICF Canoe Sprint World Championships =

Canoeing competition held in Sweden

The 1938 ICF Canoe Sprint World Championships were held in Vaxholm, Sweden, outside Stockholm, between 6–7 August 1938. This event was held under the auspices of the Internationale Repräsentantenschaft Kanusport (IRK), founded in 1924 and the forerunner of the International Canoe Federation.

The men's competition consisted of three Canadian (single paddle, open boat) and seven kayak events. Two events were held for the women, both in kayak.

This was the first championships in canoe sprint and the only one held prior to World War II which would break out the following year. It is also the only time the K-1 10000 m folding and K-2 10000 m folding events would take place in the world championships.

== Medal summary ==
=== Men's ===
==== Canoe ====
Event	Gold	Time	Silver	Time	Bronze	Time
C-1 1000 m	Otto Neumüller (GER)	6:45.8	Hans Wiedemann (GER)	6:51.4	Bohumil Sládek (TCH)	7:11.7
C-2 1000 m	Germany; Rupert Weinstabl; Karl Proisl	5:47.3	Czechoslovakia; Bohuslav Karlík; Jan Brzák-Felix	5:52.3	Czechoslovakia; Václav Mottl; Zdeněk Škrland	5:54.4
C-2 10000 m	Czechoslovakia; Bohuslav Karlík; Jan Brzák-Felix	52:38.7	Germany; Rupert Weinstabl; Karl Proisl	53:06.5	Germany; Christian Holzenberg; Heinz Jürgens	54:12.4

==== Kayak ====
Event	Gold	Time	Silver	Time	Bronze	Time
K-1 1000 m	Karl Widmark (SWE)	5:03.2	Helmut Cämmerer (GER)	5:05.9	Gregor Hradetzky (GER)	5:06.4
K-1 10000 m	Karl Widmark (SWE)	46:42.8	Czesław Sobieraj (POL)	47:35.6	Egon Nilsson (SWE)	48:10.7
K-1 10000 m folding	Arne Bogren (SWE)	51.48.8	Kamill Balatoni (HUN)	51:49.7	Günter Nowatzki (GER)	51:59.3
K-2 1000 m	Germany; Helmut Triebe; Hans Eberle	4:46.6	Sweden; Kurt Boo; Hans Berglund	4:45.5	Denmark; Poul Larsen; Vagn Jørgensen	4:46.7
K-2 10000 m	Sweden; Gunnar Johansson; Berndt Berndtsson	43:29.9	Germany; Helmut Triebe; Hans Eberle	44:06.6	Germany; Adolf Kainz; Karl Maurer	44:21.1
K-2 10000 m folding	Sweden; Carl-Gustav Hellstrandt; Erik Helsvik	47:11.5	Sweden; Sven Johansson; Erik Bladström	47:37.7	Germany; Kurt Kreh; Johann Fuchs	48:10.7
K-4 1000 m	Germany; Ernst Kube; Heini Brüggemann; Ernst Strathmann; Heine Strathmann	4:08.2	Germany; Hans Rein; Josef Reidel; Albert Schorn; Karl Aulenbach	4:08.8	Sweden; Roland Karlsson; Göte Carlsson; Gunnar Johansson; Berndt Berndtsson	4:10.5

=== Women's ===
==== Kayak ====
Event	Gold	Time	Silver	Time	Bronze	Time
K-1 600 m	Maggie Kalka (FIN)	3:26.0	Maj-Britt Bergqvist (SWE)	3:30.3	Bodil Thirstedt (DEN)	3:32.2
K-2 600 m	Czechoslovakia; Marta Pavlisová; Marie Zvolánková	3:05.2	Germany; Josefa Köster; Elisabeth Kropp	3:05.5	Denmark; Ruth Lange; Bodil Thirstedt	3:06.9

== Medals table ==
Rank	Nation	Gold	Silver	Bronze	Total
1	Sweden (SWE)	5	3	2	10
2	Germany (GER)	4	6	5	15
3	Czechoslovakia (TCH)	2	1	2	5
4	Finland (FIN)	1	0	0	1
5	Hungary (HUN)	0	1	0	1
5	Poland (POL)	0	1	0	1
7	Denmark (DEN)	0	0	3	3
Totals (7 entries)		12	12	12	36
