= Joé Treinen =

Luxembourgish canoeist

Joseph "Joé" Treinen (February 1, 1911 – October 16, 1982) was a Luxembourgish canoeist who competed in the 1936 Summer Olympics. He was born in Luxembourg City.

In 1936 he finished sixth in the C-1 1000 metre competition and twelfth in the folding K-1 10000 metre event.
