= Canoeing at the 1924 Summer Olympics =

Canoeing was a demonstration sport at the 1924 Summer Olympics in Paris. It was the first time that the sport was part of the Olympic program, and it would become a full medal sport 12 years later at the 1936 Games.

The French Olympic Committee, as hosts of these Games, asked the Canadian Olympic Committee to demonstrate the sport in Paris. Races were arranged between the Canadian Canoe Association and the Washington Canoe Club from the United States. Events were held for each of 1, 2, and 4 paddlers for both single-end paddles (modern canoe style) and double-end paddles (modern kayak style).

== Event results ==
One paddler, simple paddle (single blade) (now C-1)

1. Roy C. Nurse (CAN)
2. Harry C. Greenshields (CAN)
3. A. A. Lindsay (CAN)

One paddler, double bladed paddle (now K-1)

1. C. W. Havens (USA)
2. Roy C. Nurse (CAN)
3. Harry T. Knight Jr. (USA)

Two paddlers, simple paddle (single blade) (now C-2)

1. Harry C. Greenshields and A. A. Lindsay (CAN)
2. Roy C. Nurse and G. M. Duncan (CAN)
3. K. M. Knight and Harry T. Knight Jr. (USA)

Two paddlers, double bladed paddle (now K-2)

1. C. W. Havens and Harry T. Knight Jr. (USA)
2. Roy C. Nurse and G. M. Duncan (CAN)

Four paddlers, simple paddle (single blade) (now C-4)

1. A. A. Lindsay, Harry C. Greenshields, G. M. Duncan, and Roy C. Nurse (CAN)
2. J. F. Larcombe, K. M. Knight, C. W. Havens, and Harry T. Knight Jr. (USA)

Four paddlers, double bladed paddle (now K-4)

1. J. F. Larcombe, K. M. Knight, C. W. Havens, and Harry T. Knight Jr. (USA)
2. A. A. Lindsay, Harry C. Greenshields, G. M. Duncan, and Roy C. Nurse (CAN)

== Medal table ==
Rank	Nation	Gold	Silver	Bronze	Total
1	Canada	3	5	1	9
2	United States	3	1	2	6
Totals (2 entries)		6	6	3	15
