= Canoe sprint =

Discipline in sport of canoeing and kayaking

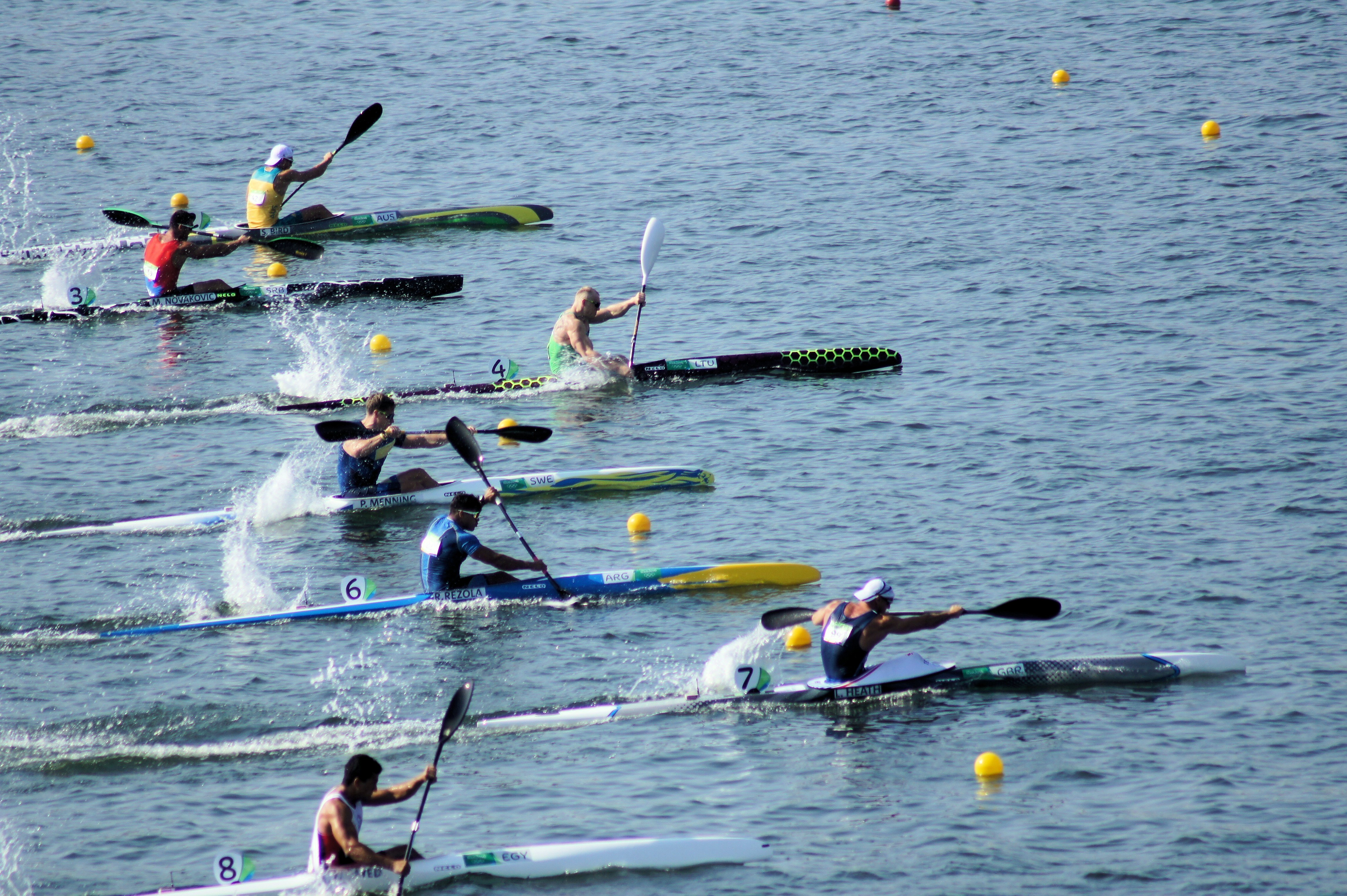
- Heat 3 of the Men's K-1 200m at the 2016 Olympic Games
- Highest governing body: Paddle Worldwide
- First modern-day competition: 1869

Characteristics
- Contact: No
- Team members: 1, 2 or 4
- Mixed-sex: Separate competitions
- Type: Water sport, outdoor
- Equipment: Kayak or Canoe, paddle (single or double bladed)
- Venue: River, artificial lake, canal
- Glossary: Glossary of canoeing terms

Presence
- Olympic: since 1936 (men only); since 1948 (both men and women)
- Paralympic: since 2016

Pictogram for Canoeing at the Summer Olympics

Canoe sprint is a water sport in which athletes race in specially designed sprint canoes or sprint kayaks on calm water over a short distance. Prior to November 2008, canoe sprint was known as flatwater racing. The term is still in use today but is often used as a hypernym for both canoe marathon and canoe sprint. Similarly, the term 'canoeing' is used to describe both kayaking and canoeing.

The sport is governed by the International Canoe Federation (ICF), which recognises four official distances and three boat classes in which athletes can compete. Competitors may race over 200, 500, 1000, and 5000 metres in crews consisting of one, two, or four athletes, across either eight or nine lanes marked by buoys. Occasionally, regional championships include variations to this format, such as 100-meter sprints.

Modern canoeing as a competitive sport can be traced back to the mid-19th century when travelers popularised competitive canoeing in central Europe and North America. Around 1900, the first national and international canoeing federations were formed, leading to international competitions in the first quarter of the 20th century. Male canoeists have competed at the Summer Olympic Games since 1936, and women's canoeing was added to the Olympic programme in 1948. Today, there are twelve canoe sprint events at the Olympics. In addition, the ICF holds an annual World Championship with many more events. On the whole, European athletes have dominated the sport, winning over 90% of all available medals.

== History ==
The Scottish traveller, John "Rob Roy" MacGregor, is widely recognised for popularising competitive canoeing during the late 19th century. Against the backdrop of Victorian society's growing interest in outdoors activities such as camping and pleasure boating, MacGregor's weekly accounts of his journey through the waterways of Europe became immensely popular.

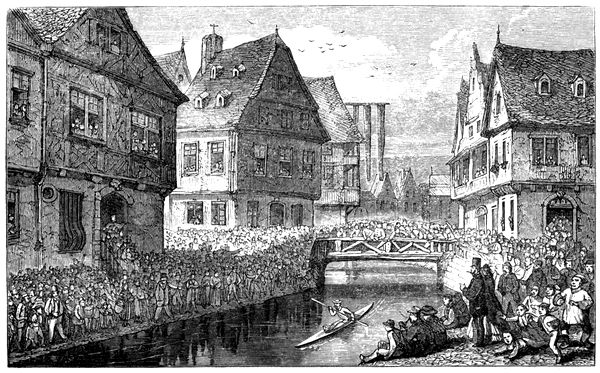
John MacGregor paddles through the small German town of Tuttlingen

Upon his return to England he authored A Thousand Miles in the Rob Roy Canoe, which would become popular and inspire others to try the sport. In 1866 he founded The Canoe Club, the world's first canoe club. It was not long before other clubs started emerging on both sides of the Atlantic. In 1867 The Canoe Club would hold the first modern day canoeing competition. It was in the same year that Prince Edward VII became club Commodore, giving the sport even more attention. The new clubs promoted the organisation of regattas and contributed to the establishment of formal national bodies to define the rules of the sport. MacGregor, for example, would go on to found the American Canoe Association in 1880.

The sport's growing popularity in the early 1900s prompted the need for international structure. In 1924, the predecessor of the International Canoe Federation, the Internationale Repräsentantenschaft Kanusport (IRK), was formed by German, Austrian and Swedish delegates at a meeting hosted by the Danish Canoe Federation. This laid the foundation for the first international competitions, including a demonstration event at the 1924 Olympic games. Despite this the sport would not be a part of the next two summer olympics. The International Olympic Committee had rejected applications for the inclusion of canoeing in the 1928 and 1932 Olympic Games due to the limited number of proposed participating nations. The application to the 1936 Olympic games faced a different challenge. The application was initially rejected in 1933, the same year as the inaugural European championships were held in Prague. Spearheading this decision was the president of the International Federation for Rowing Societies (FISA), who expressed concern that an influx of small crafts would compromise the freedom of rowers on lakes and waterways. The IRK, however, successfully appealed this decision in 1934, leading to the inclusion of canoeing at the Summer Olympics starting from the 1936 Olympic Games onwards. The first world championship took place in 1938 in Vaxholm. Since the first international competitions, there has been a noticeable trend of reducing the race distances. As 10km was removed, 500m and 200m were introduced.

=== Inclusion of women ===
Despite canoe sprint becoming an Olympic sport in 1936, women had to wait until the 1948 Olympic Games before they were allowed to compete in canoeing at an Olympic level, albeit only in one discipline, as opposed to the eight available to men at the time. This ratio has improved very slowly but steadily since then, with the 2020 Summer Olympics being the first Olympic Games to see an equal number of events for both women and men, with women competing in canoes for the first time. The slow progress has often been justified by an aim to distribute events fairly, given event caps and athlete quotas in light of a lesser number of female athletes, particularly in canoeing. This is still the case in most nations. Similarly, the 2021 ICF Canoe Sprint World Championships were the first to have an equal number of events for both women and men, with women being able to race in canoes since the 2010 World Championships.

== Race categories ==
Race categories are defined by gender, boat class, and distance. The distances recognized by the ICF for international canoe sprint races are 200m, 500m, 1000m, and 5000m. Over these four distances, the ICF recognizes six boat classes, known as 'International Boats'. These are: K1, K2, K4, C1, C2, and C4, where the number indicates the size of the crew and “K” stands for kayak and “C” for canoe. Thus "MK1 1000m" would stand for a male one-person kayak racing over 1000 meters.

Crew boats only race over the shortest three distances, which are also the only distances to have featured at the Olympic Games since 1960. Whilst athletes must race in designated lanes for the 200, 500, and 1000 meter races, the 5000m diverges from this format. Instead, athletes start in a large pack, navigating a set course with several turning points. More turns have been introduced over time with the aim of making the event more interesting to spectators.

=== Trends ===
As there are many different possible combinations amongst boat classes and distances, not every possible event is held. This has led to a general trend of allocating shorter events to women and longer events to men, especially at the Olympics where there is an event cap. This trend has become much less noticeable at the ICF World Championships, with only one race category that men and women do not both compete in since 2021. The same is true for canoes, which race over shorter distances at the Olympics in comparison to kayaks. At the ICF World Championships, though, there is little to no difference between the classes. While the ICF has given no clear reason for this difference, it is likely due to the gap in speeds between men and women, and between kayaks and canoes. This also supports the fact that the faster crew boats, especially the C4 and the K4, tend to race over 500 and 1000 meters.

At the 2021 and 2022 ICF World Championships, the ICF launched a completely new race class: the mixed K2 200m and 500m respectively. Here a man and a woman race together, and the class is abbreviated by an X; for example, "XK2 200". The 2023 Junior and U23 World Championships also saw the introduction of a relay mixed K1 5000m, which has yet to be brought to the senior level.

At the 2023 ICF Canoe Sprint World Championships, a radical change was made to the 5000 meter race when the ICF introduced six portages. During these, athletes must jump out of their boats and carry them for a short distance before getting back in. This decision was made after the success of canoe marathon, where portages are an integral part of the discipline, in engaging viewers. This decision has been met with critique in some circles, as marathon paddlers suddenly gained a distinct advantage due to being more practiced at portaging. Additionally, sprint boats cannot have a foot pump to remove water from the boat, making portages more difficult and chaotic, with equipment sometimes becoming damaged, causing athletes to retire from the race.

== Venues ==
Canoe sprint races take place on flatwater courses, including lakes, calm rivers, or artificial waterways. Regattas at a national and international level take place on regatta courses, which are typically 2km long and consist of different lanes demarcated by buoys. The colour and placement of the buoys follows the Albano-system. The ICF further requires that there is a homologated start system at the 200m, 500m and 1000m marks. For long distance races, so the 5000m, the ICF requires either a long distance start system or a long pontoon.

== Kayak ==
In a kayak, the paddler is seated in the direction of travel, and uses a double-bladed paddle. Kayaks have a rudder for steering and course adjustment, which is operated by the feet of the paddler in the front. The paddle used is usually a 'wing paddle' (although standard asymmetrical paddles can also be used) – wing paddles have blades which are shaped to resemble a wing or spoon, creating lift and increasing the power and stability of the stroke. There are many variations of wing paddles, ranging from longer and narrower options for more stability throughout the entire stroke to more extreme 'teardrop' shaped paddles for a firmer application of power at the start of the stroke.

== Canoe ==
In a canoe the paddler kneels on one knee with the other leg forward and foot flat on the floor of the boat, and paddles a single-bladed paddle on one side only with what is known as a 'J-stroke' to control the boat's direction. In Canada, a racing class exists for the C-15 or WC or "War Canoe", as well as a similarly designed C-4 (which is much shorter and more squat than an 'International' C-4). An antiquated boat class is the C-7, resembling a large C4 which was debuted by the ICF with little success. For racing canoes, the blade is typically short and broad, with a 'power face' on one side that is either flat or scalloped out. The shaft will typically be longer than a tripping canoe paddle, because the kneeling position puts the paddler higher above the surface of the water. More recent designs of canoe racing paddles often have a slight bent shaft, commonly 12–14 degrees. (a concept of canoe designer Eugene Jensen in the 1960s). Many high-performance canoe paddlers prefer the feel of a wooden handle with a carbon fiber shaft and blade, while nearly all high-performance kayak paddlers use paddles made completely of carbon fiber.

== Gallery ==
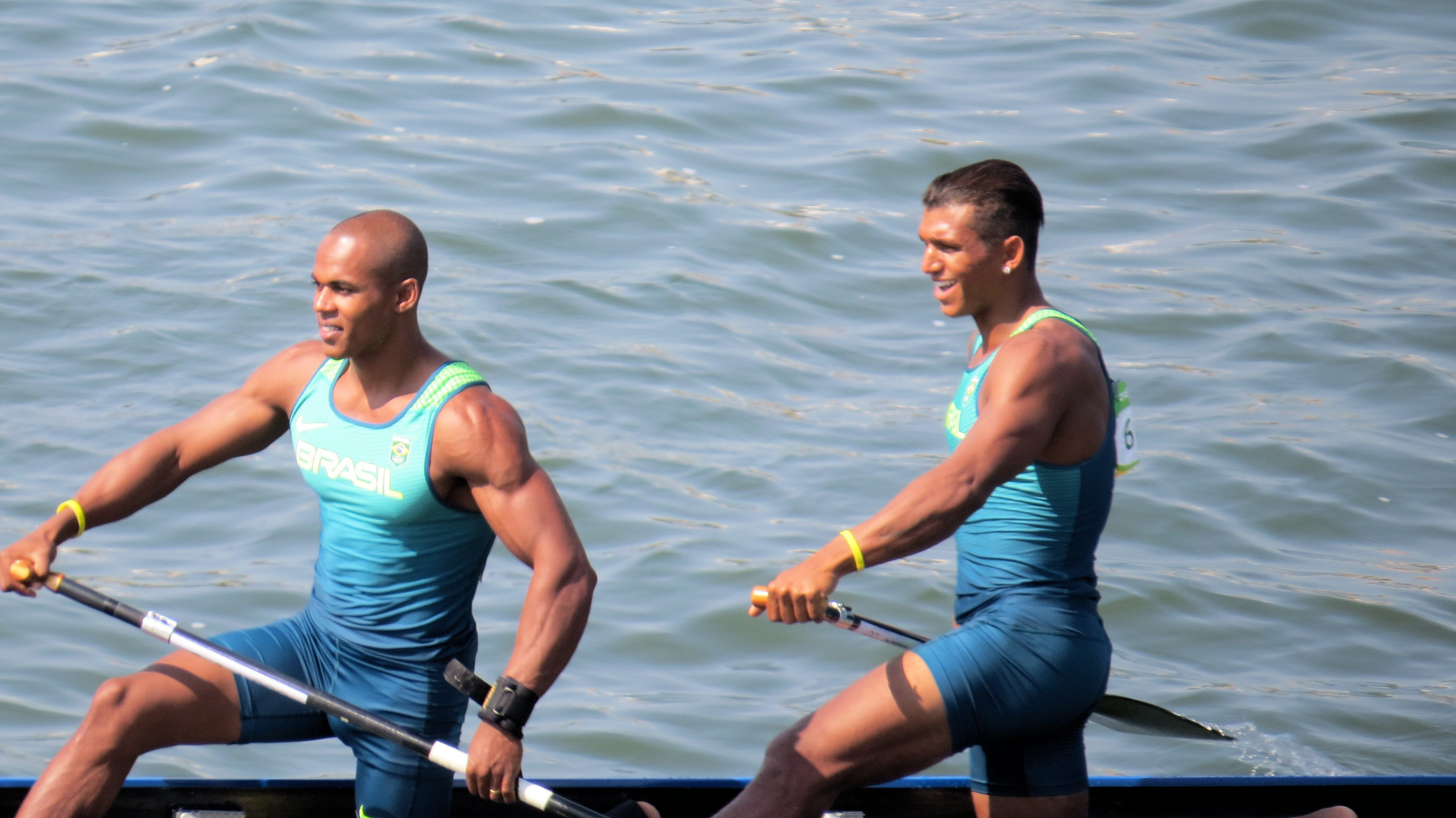

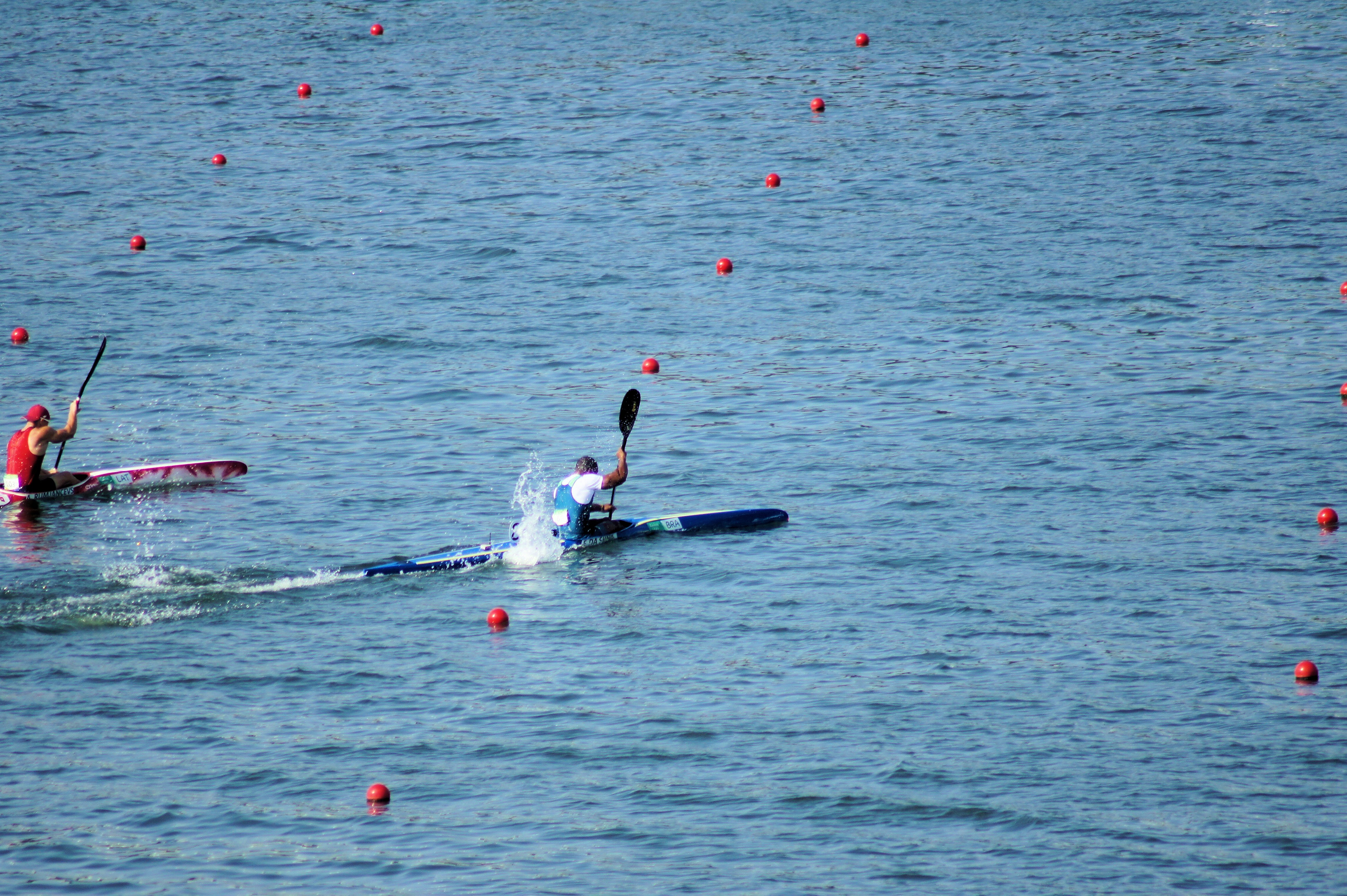

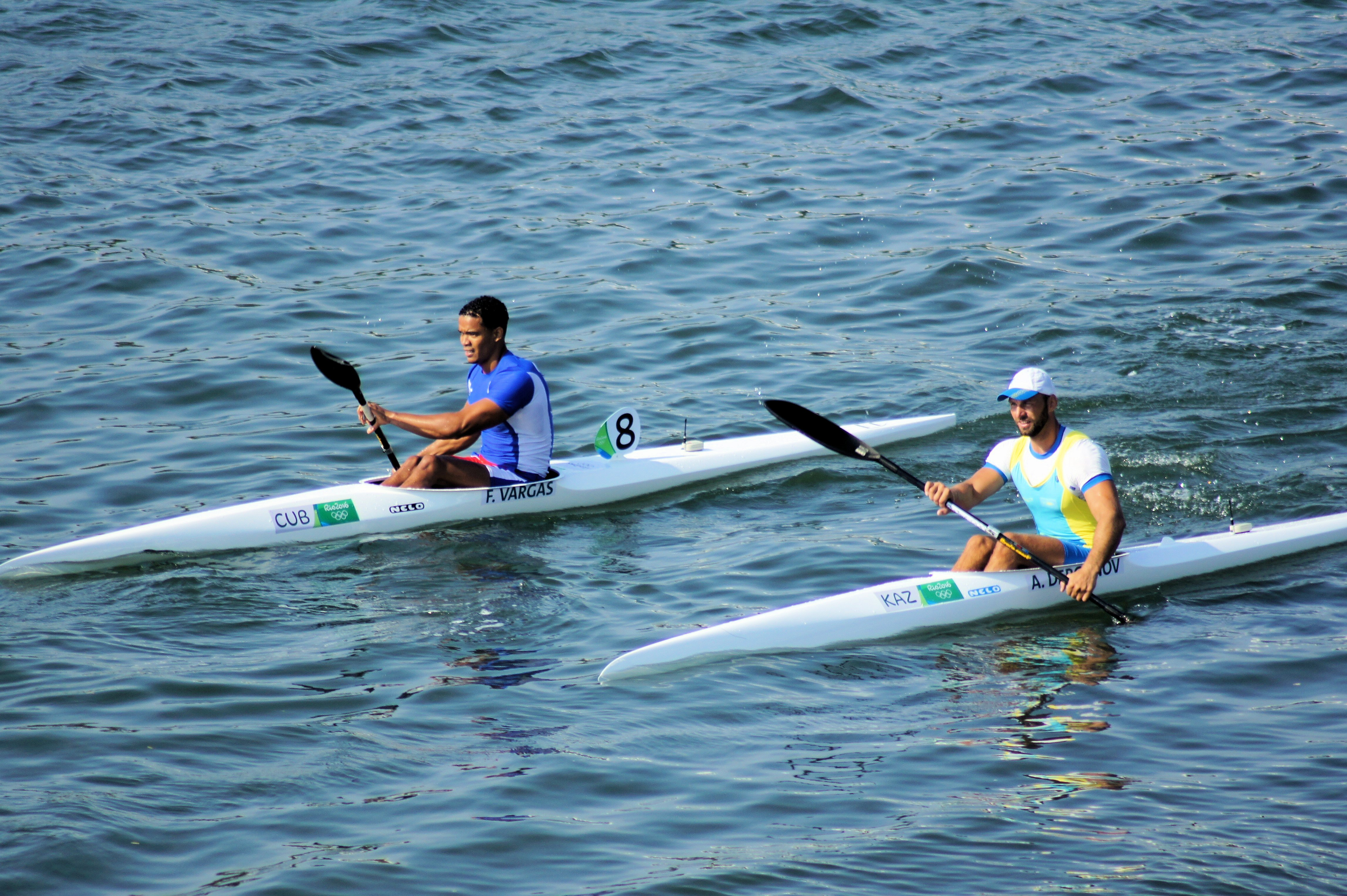

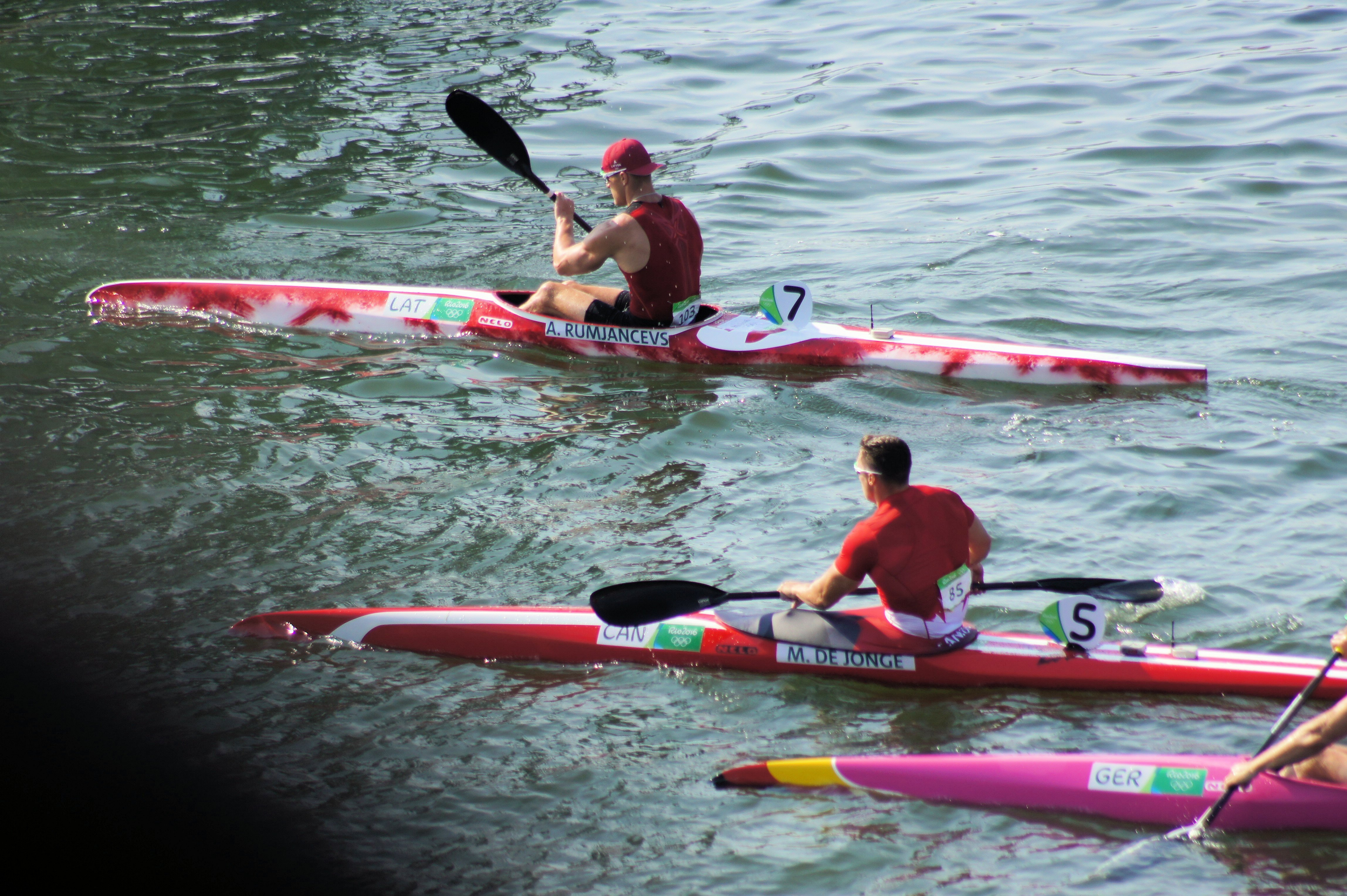

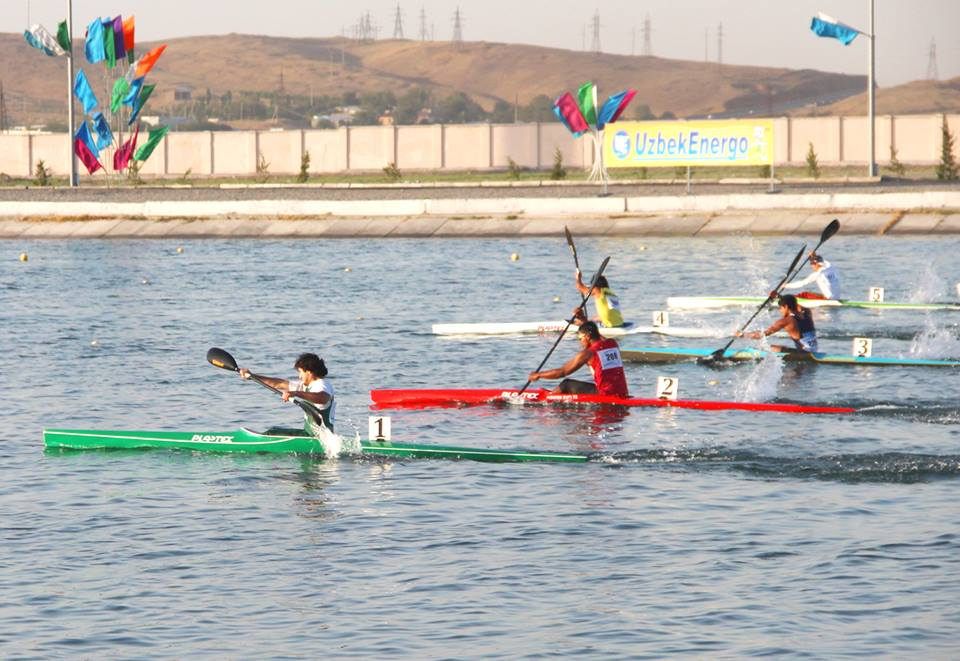

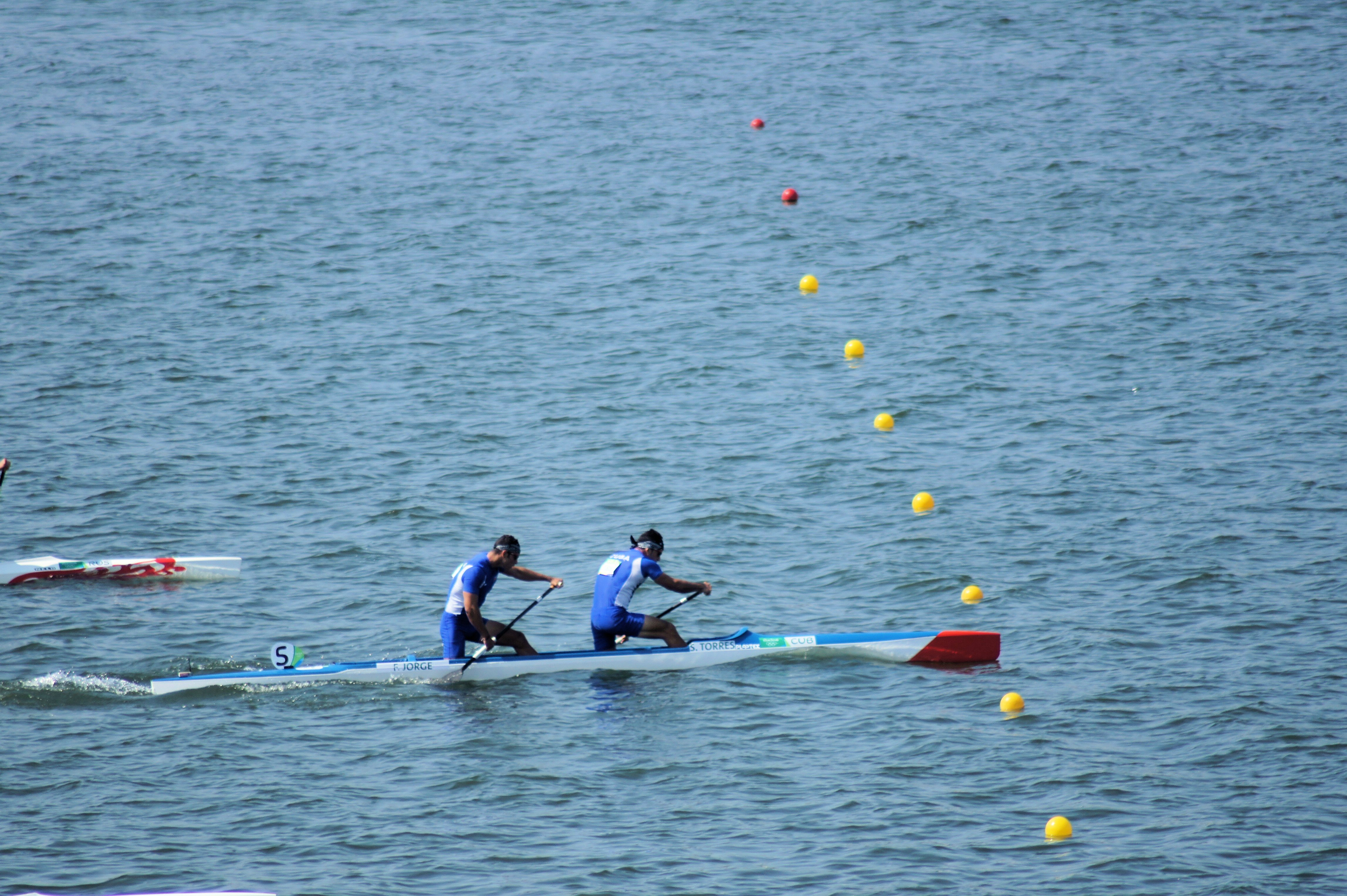

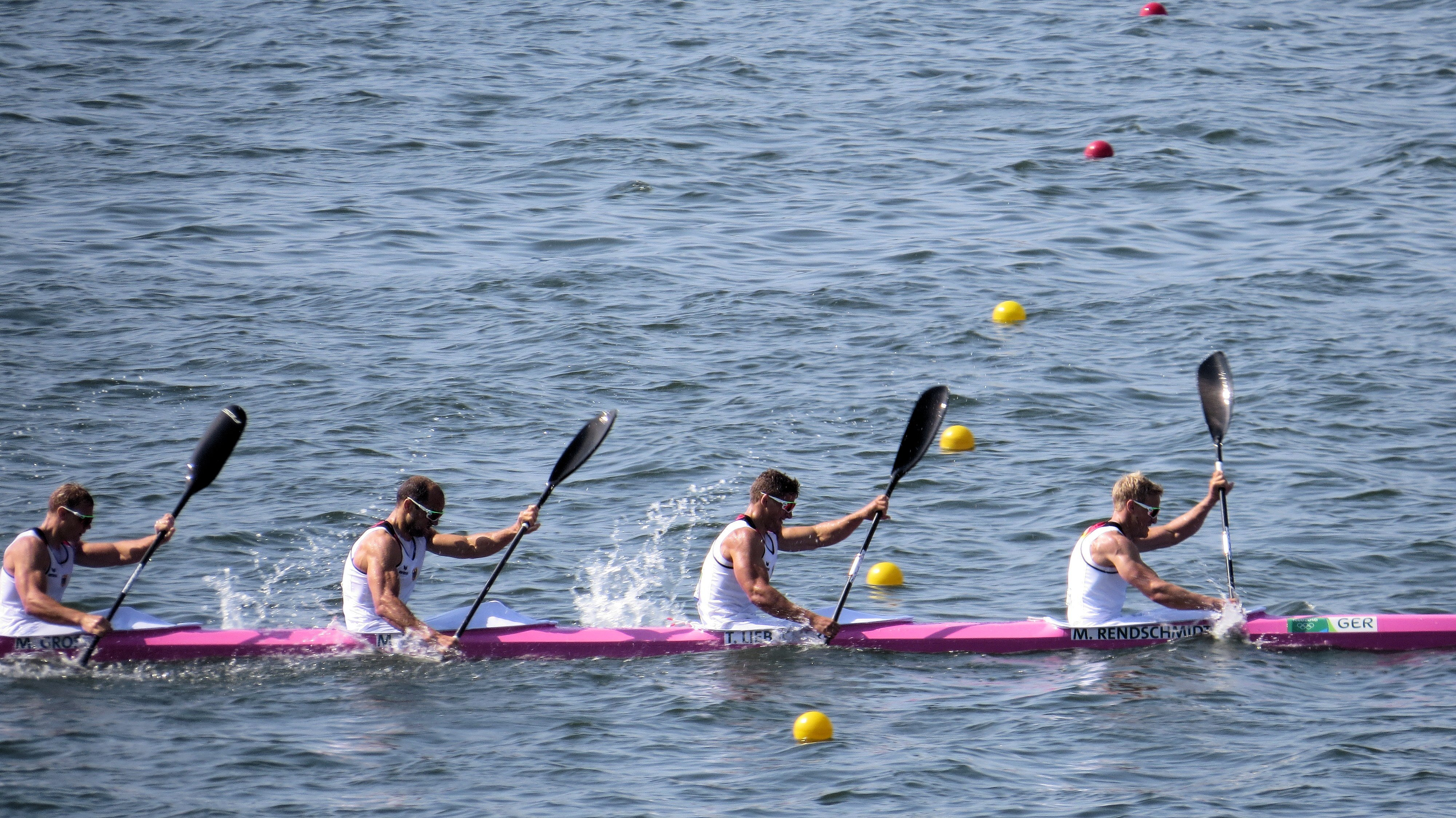

== See also ==
- Canoe marathon
- Canoeing at the Summer Olympics
- International Canoe Federation
- ICF Canoe Sprint World Championships
