= Deaths in February 1986 =

The following is a list of notable deaths in February 1986.

Entries for each day are listed alphabetically by surname. A typical entry lists information in the following sequence:

- Name, age, country of citizenship at birth, subsequent country of citizenship (if applicable), reason for notability, cause of death (if known), and reference.

== February 1986 ==
=== 1 ===
- Ethel Chipchase, 69–70, British trade unionist.
- Manuel Cros, 84, Spanish footballer.
- Theodora McCormick Du Bois, 95, American author.
- Salo Grenning, 67, Norwegian illustrator.
- Dick James, 65, British music producer, heart attack.
- Max Kröckel, 84, German Olympic skier (1928).
- Alberto Moreiras, 66, Spanish Olympic athlete (1948).
- Alva Myrdal, 84, Swedish sociologist and peace activist, Nobel Prize recipient (1982).
- Michael Needham, 75, American politician, member of the Pennsylvania House of Representatives (1947–1972).
- Beatrice Pearson, 65, American actress.
- Arvo Pentti, 70, Finnish politician.
- Lambert Redd, 77, American Olympic long jumper (1932).
- Ida Rhodes, 85, American mathematician.
- Leonard E. Scott, 68, American politician, member of the Iowa House of Representatives (1947–1949).

=== 2 ===
- Nils Alwall, 81, Swedish nephrologist.
- Olena Antoniv, 48, Soviet Ukrainian human rights activist, traffic collision.
- Rick E. Carter, 42, American football coach, suicide by hanging.
- Anita Cobby, 26, Australian murder victim.
- Donald Eccles, 77, British actor
- Gao Heng, 85, Chinese linguist and translator.
- Gino Hernandez, 28, American professional wrestler, drug overdose.
- Richard LaPiere, 86, American sociologist.
- Mill Reef, 17, British Thoroughbred racehorse, euthanised.
- John Millar, 62, Scottish footballer.
- Hideo Ohba, 75, Japanese aikido teacher.
- Ruben Ribeiro, 74, Brazilian Olympic equestrian (1948).
- Ivan Ruben, 68, Danish Olympic fencer (1948, 1952).
- Gunnar Simenstad, 71, Norwegian actor.

=== 3 ===
- Alexander F. Bell, 70, American football player.
- Donald Briggs, 75, American actor.
- Art Chapman, 73, Canadian Olympic basketball player (1936).
- Claude Green, 79, South African cricketer.
- Luther Harris, 62, American NBL basketball player.
- Charles Leo Hitchcock, 83, American botanist.
- Harold Houghton, 79, English footballer.
- Narciso Ramos, 85, Filipino diplomat and politician, stroke.
- Sylvia Lyons Render, 72, American educator and manuscript curator.
- George C. Sherman Jr., 74, American polo player, leukemia.
- Herbert Smith, 84, British filmmaker.
- Alfred Vohrer, 71, German filmmaker.

=== 4 ===
- Phyllis Shand Allfrey, 77, Dominican writer and politician.
- Les Caywood, 82, American NFL football player.
- Margit Elek, 75, Hungarian Olympic fencer (1948, 1952).
- Jānis Kalnbērziņš, 92, Soviet Latvian politician.
- Jim O'Grady, 63, Irish hurler.
- Branko Pešić, 63, Yugoslav politician, mayor of Belgrade (1965–1974), cancer.
- Arthur Schröder, 93, German actor.

=== 5 ===
- Grigore Băjenaru, 78, Romanian writer.
- Len Catton, 72, Australian rules footballer.
- Charles Drechsler, 93, American mycologist.
- Florence Fernet-Martel, 93, American-born Canadian feminist and educator.
- Antonio Fustella, 73, Italian Roman Catholic prelate, heart attack.
- Armas-Eino Martola, 89, Finnish general.
- Laurent Merchiers, 81, Belgian politician.
- Furman Nuss, 91, American football and basketball coach.
- Axel Poignant, 79, Australian photographer.
- Howard Vollum, 72, American electronics engineer (Tektronix), stroke.
- Matt Wilkins, 78, Australian rules footballer.

=== 6 ===
- Mahieddine Bachtarzi, 88, Algerian singer and composer.
- Georges Cabana, 91, Canadian Roman Catholic prelate.
- Frank Cameron, 93, Australian rules footballer.
- Willard Cantrell, 71, American racing driver.
- Cristóbal Colón de Carvajal, 17th Duke of Veragua, 61, Spanish naval officer, shot.
- Frederick Coutts, 86, British writer and charity worker, General of The Salvation Army (1963–1969).
- Irene Genna, 55, Greek-Italian actress.
- Sallie-Anne Huckstepp, 31, Australian writer, sex-worker and whistle blower, homicide.
- Sergio Iesi, 73, Italian-born Uruguayan Olympic fencer (1948, 1952).
- Ken McMullen, 44, Australian rugby union player.
- Sir Holmes Miller, 66, New Zealand surveyor and conservationist.
- Ray Moyer, 87, American set decorator.
- Dandy Nichols, 78, English actress (Till Death Us Do Part).
- Marty Reiter, 74, American NBL basketball player.
- John Ching Hsiung Wu, 86, Chinese judge and author.
- Minoru Yamasaki, 73, American architect (World Trade Center), stomach cancer.

=== 7 ===
- Cheikh Anta Diop, 62, Senegalese anthropologist and historian.
- Harris Ellsworth, 86, American politician, member of the U.S. House of Representatives (1943–1957).
- Austin E. Fife, 76, American folklorist.
- John F. McCarthy Jr., 60, American aeronautical engineer, blood clot.
- Robert P. Mills, 65, American magazine editor and literary agent.
- Armand Preud'homme, 81, Belgian composer and organist.
- John Shea, 72, Australian cricketer.
- Frank Sinclair, 69, Australian rules footballer.
- Dick Southwood, 80, English Olympic rower (1932, 1936).

=== 8 ===
- Doug Ball, 90, New Zealand academic administrator.
- Cecil Bryce, 74, Australian cricketer.
- Alexander Ford, 85, Scottish cricketer.
- Yisrael Galili, 74, Russian-born Israeli politician.
- Robert Gebhardt, 65, German footballer.
- Arleigh McCree, 46, American police detective, bomb explosion.
- Sarah Isabella McElligott, 102, New Zealand cook.
- Alexis Obolensky, 70, Russian-born American backgammon player.
- Abram Nicholas Pritzker, 90, American businessman and philanthropist, member of the Pritzker family.
- Bogusław Widawski, 51, Polish footballer.

=== 9 ===
- Kiichi Arita, 84, Japanese politician.
- Carmen D'Antonio, 74, American actress.
- Ángel Díaz Balbín, 30, Peruvian triple murderer and suspected serial killer, strangled.
- Joe Gomes, 77, American baseball player.
- Philip Herries Gregory, 78, British mycologist.
- Harold Fidock, 83, Australian cricketer.
- Willie Jackson, 85, Scottish footballer.
- Eleonora Kaminskaitė, 35, Soviet Lithuanian Olympic rower (1976).
- Tauno Kovanen, 68, Finnish Olympic wrestler (1952).
- Ítalo López Vallecillos, 53, Salvadoran writer.
- Lilo Martin, 77, German composer.
- Natalie Masters, 70, American actress.
- Henry William Menard, 65, American geologist, cancer.
- Ben Nye, 79, American makeup artist.
- Jacques Rispal, 62, French actor.
- Dora Oake Russell, 73, Canadian writer.
- Louis Sobol, 89, American journalist.

=== 10 ===
- Brian Aherne, 83, English actor (Juarez), heart failure.
- Morris Boyd, 80, American politician, member of the Ohio House of Representatives (1967–1972).
- Lando Conti, 52, Italian politician, shot.
- James Dillon, 83, Irish politician, TD (1937–1969).
- Humphrey Patrick Guinness, 83, British Olympic polo player (1936).
- Joan Henley, 81, Irish actress.
- Begnon-Damien Koné, 64–65, Burkinabe politician.
- Antoni Reiter, 35, Polish Olympic judoka (1976).
- Art Satherley, 96, British-American record producer.

=== 11 ===
- Hans Braarvig, 80, Norwegian writer.
- Arsénio Duarte, 60, Portuguese footballer.
- Frank Herbert, 65, American author (Dune), pulmonary embolism.
- Michael Hollis, 86, Indian Anglican prelate.
- Svend Jacobsen, 79, Danish Olympic fencer (1936).
- Evelio Javier, 43, Filipino politician, shot.
- Edgar Jones, 75, Welsh rugby union and rugby league player.
- Horace Manges, 87, American lawyer.
- Hélène Rivier, 83, Swiss librarian.
- Aat van Rhijn, 93, Dutch politician.
- Jock White, 88, Scottish footballer.

=== 12 ===
- Jean Goodwin Ames, 82, American artist.
- Arthur Roderick Collar, 77, English engineer.
- Alice Lent Covert, 72, American novelist.
- Wayne Ewing, 58, American race car builder.
- Joe Goyder, 78, English Olympic boxer (1928).
- Bolesław Konorski, 93, Polish engineer.
- James Joseph Magennis, 66, British naval officer, VC recipient.
- Elena Skuin, 77, Soviet painter.
- Guy Warrack, 86, Scottish composer.

=== 13 ===
- Luigi De Manincor, 75, Italian Olympic sailor (1936, 1948).
- Bolesław Gebert, 90, Polish politician.
- Guang Qin, 93, Chinese Buddhist monk.
- George Ivask, 78, Russian-American poet and literary critic, heart attack.
- Robert MacFarlane, 77, Scottish cricketer.
- Ed McGhee, 61, American Major League baseball player.
- David Tudor Price, 55, British judge.
- Ashalata Sen, 92, Indian poet and social activist.
- John L. Throckmorton, 72, American general, cancer.

=== 14 ===
- Fox Blevins, 75, American baseball player.
- Ernest Borek, 74, Hungarian-born American microbiologist.
- Dorcas Brigham, 89, American botanist.
- Ransom M. Cook, 86, American banker.
- Kevin Curran, 66, Australian rules footballer.
- Margaret L. Curry, 87, American social worker.
- Kanaklata Devi, 76, Indian politician.
- Francisco Ferreira, 66, Portuguese footballer.
- Bert Hawke, 85, Australian politician.
- Roy W. Hill, 86, American automobile dealer and philanthropist.
- Harry S. Kennedy, 84, American Episcopalian prelate.
- Edmund Rubbra, 84, British composer.

=== 15 ===
- Henri Bernard, 86, French judge.
- Cornelis de Kiewiet, 83, Dutch-born American historian and academic administrator.
- Ana María Dellai, 56, Argentine Olympic skier (1952).
- Orville Fehlhaber, 82, American politician.
- Fred Laws, 80, Australian rugby league player.
- Galliano Masini, 90, Italian singer.
- Rustin McIntosh, 91, American pediatrician.
- Crawford F. Parker, 79, American politician, lieutenant governor of Indiana (1957–1961).
- John R., 75, American disc jockey.
- Helen Withers, 78, Australian community worker.

=== 16 ===
- Wiley T. Buchanan Jr., 73, American diplomat.
- Howard da Silva, 76, American actor (Fiorello!, Oklahoma!), lymphoma.
- Joseph Duell, 29, American ballet dancer and choreographer, suicide by jumping.
- Anton Hilbert, 87, German politician.
- Édouard Leguery, 51, French Olympic rower (1956).
- Phyllis McCarthy, 82, South African dog breeder.
- Tadhg O'Driscoll, 66, Irish footballer.
- Hermon Phillips, 82, American Olympic runner (1928).
- Willibrordus Pouw, 83, Dutch Olympic gymnast (1928).
- John Tripp, 58, British poet.
- Harry Van Arsdale Jr., 80, American labor leader.

=== 17 ===
- George Draffen, 86, British soldier.
- Albert Joris, 70, Belgian Olympic sprint canoeist (1936).
- Kikuko Kanai, 74, Japanese composer.
- Jiddu Krishnamurti, 90, Indian philosopher, pancreatic cancer.
- Red Ruffing, 80, American Major League baseball player, heart failure.
- Paul Stewart, 77, American actor, heart failure.
- Izumi Suzuki, 36, Japanese writer, suicide by hanging.
- Nesta Wells, 93, British physician and surgeon.

=== 18 ===
- Nelson Cavaquinho, 74, Brazilian samba musician.
- Július Ďuriš, 81, Czechoslovak communist politician.
- Vilmos Kohut, 79, Hungarian footballer.
- Matilda Landsman, 67, American journalist.
- George Makinson, 82, Canadian politician.
- Tezer Özlü, 42, Turkish writer, breast cancer.
- Pierre Schlumberger, 71–72, American oil executive (Schlumberger).
- Jonathan O. Seaman, 74, American general.
- Ted Wegert, 53, American NFL football player.

=== 19 ===
- Bill Anderson, 73, English football player and manager.
- Robert Brode, 85, American physicist (Manhattan Project).
- Adolfo Celi, 63, Italian actor (Thunderball) and film director, heart attack.
- Paul Curry, 68, American magician.
- James Eastland, 81, American politician, member of the U.S. Senate (1941, 1943–1978).
- André Leroi-Gourhan, 74, French archaeologist.
- Francisco Mignone, 88, Brazilian composer.
- Oleg Mutt, 65, Estonian linguist.
- Humberto Roa, 73, Chilean footballer.
- Barry Seal, 46, American pilot and drug smuggler, shot.
- Dudley Talcott, 86, American sculptor.
- Ab van Bemmel, 73, Dutch Olympic boxer (1936).

=== 20 ===
- Tommy Bell, 63, American NFL football referee, leukemia.
- William Albert Beller, 85, American pianist.
- Abdolbaghi Darvish, 37, Iranian Air Force pilot, shootdown.
- Judy-Lynn del Rey, 43, American science fiction magazine editor.
- Tommy Freeman, 82, American boxer.
- Kanu Gandhi, 68–69, Indian photographer.
- Nihar Ranjan Gupta, 74, Indian novelist.
- František Kardaus, 77, Czechoslovak graphic artist.
- Salvador Mota, 63, Mexican footballer.
- Einar Nyheim, 56, Norwegian politician.
- Guillermo Padilla, 73, Colombian Olympic sports shooter (1956).
- Bob Rice, 86, American Major League baseball player.
- Koos Rietkerk, 58, Dutch politician.
- Bert Schneider, 88, American-born Canadian Olympic boxer (1920).
- Dorothea Wieck, 78, German actress.

=== 21 ===
- Heinz Braun, 48, German painter and actor, cancer.
- Victor Canning, 74, British novelist.
- Jan Eric Cartwright, 47, American politician, member of the Oklahoma House of Representatives (1971–1973), leukemia.
- Larry Wu-tai Chin, 63, Chinese double agent, suicide by asphyxiation.
- Derek Chittock, 64, British cartoonist and art historian.
- Sir Miles Clifford, 89, British politician.
- Gilbert V. Hartke, 79, American theatre director.
- Agnes Headlam-Morley, 83, British historian.
- Eckhard Hess, 69, German-born American psychologist.
- Yanosuke Hirai, 83, Japanese civil engineer.
- Margaret Hunter, 63, Scottish trade unionist.
- Shigechiyo Izumi, Japanese longevity claimant.
- Kenjiro Matsuki, 77, Japanese baseball player.
- Edvardas Mikučiauskas, 84, Soviet Lithuanian footballer.
- Dorothy Rhoads, 90, American writer.
- Helen Hooven Santmyer, 90, American writer ("...And Ladies of the Club").
- Louis Silberkleit, 85, American publisher.
- Mart Stam, 86, Dutch architect.

=== 22 ===
- Jacques Pâris de Bollardière, 78, French general and peace activist.
- Tom Bradshaw, 81, Scottish footballer.
- Randolph Claiborne, 79, American Episcopalian prelate.
- John Donnelly, 31, Australian rugby league player, drowned.
- Ida Lublenski Ehrlich, 99, Russian-born American playwright.
- Bob Guelker, 62, American soccer coach.
- Claude Hettier de Boislambert, 79, French politician and resistance leader.
- Philip J. Lang, 74, American composer.
- Duke Lattimore, 81, American baseball player.
- Richard Pescott, 80, Australian botanist.
- Anthony Rawlinson, 59, British civil servant.
- Jean Tangye, 66, English author.
- Wei Pei-lan, 74, Chinese politician.

=== 23 ===
- Miklós Asztalos, 86, Hungarian playwright.
- Mathilde Boniface, 74, Belgian politician.
- Ram Nath Chawla, 82, Indian pilot.
- Andoni Elizondo, 53, Spanish footballer.
- Esther V. Hansen, 87, American historian.
- Edwin S. Lowe, 75, Polish-American game entrepreneur.
- Ferenc Mérei, 76, Hungarian psychologist.
- Ernst Neufert, 85, German architect.
- Ørnulv Ødegård, 84, Norwegian psychiatrist.
- Louis-Philippe Pigeon, 81, Canadian judge.
- Bill Ribchester, 87, Scottish footballer.
- Boris Slutsky, 66, Soviet poet.
- Nino Taranto, 78, Italian actor.

=== 24 ===
- Christian H. Armbruster, 64, American politician, respiratory disease.
- Rukmini Devi Arundale, 81, Indian dancer.
- David Ballantyne, 61, New Zealand writer.
- Tommy Douglas, 81, Scottish-born Canadian politician, cancer.
- Harold L. George, 92, American fighter pilot and politician.
- Bill Hickman, 65, American stuntman, cancer.
- Alfred Hurley, 90, British Anglican prelate.
- Harry Lightsey, 85, American football player.
- Gertrude Meredith, 93, American Olympic pair skater (1932).
- Marcus Roberto, 55, American politician, member of the Ohio House of Representatives (1971–1976) and Senate (since 1977), cancer.
- Arthur Rydstrøm, 90, Norwegian Olympic gymnast (1920).
- James Humphrey Walwyn, 72, British naval officer.

=== 25 ===
- George Berry, 86, American NFL football player.
- Pasquale Festa Campanile, 58, Italian filmmaker, kidney cancer.
- Joseph Jeffrey Charlebois, 76, Canadian politician and businessman.
- Hugo Larsson, 79, Swedish civil servant and engineer.
- Guy Pawson, 97, British colonial administrator and cricketer.
- Victor Pike, 78, British rugby player and Anglican prelate.
- Marcus Ruddle, 81, Irish cricketer.
- George Susce, 78, American Major League baseball player.
- Helen F. Tucker, 84, American biochemist.
- Nemesio Yabut, 60, Filipino politician.

=== 26 ===
- Andy Bakjian, 71, American track and field coach.
- Martin Julian Buerger, 82, American crystallographer.
- Amalia Fleming, 73, Greek politician and physician.
- Taihei Imamura, 74, Japanese film critic.
- Dag Klaveness, 72, Norwegian shipowner.
- Robert Landesmann, 73, French Olympic wrestler (1948).
- Sophocles Papas, 91–93, Ottoman-American music publisher.
- Karel Vlach, 74, Czechoslovak choreographer.
- Lillian Mayfield Wright, 91, American poet.

=== 27 ===
- Gholam-Hossein Banan, 74, Iranian musician.
- Gedeon Barcza, 74, Hungarian chess player.
- Pat Beasley, 72, English footballer.
- Elisabeth Frisk, 76, Swedish actress.
- John Gorwell, 51, Australian rules footballer.
- Bernhard Haurwitz, 80, German-born American meteorologist.
- Arthur Heina, 71, German Olympic swimmer (1936).
- Nancy Brysson Morrison, 82, Scottish author.
- Arnoldo Ortelli, 72, Swiss footballer.
- Jacques Plante, 57, Canadian ice hockey player, stomach cancer.
- Aimé Trantoul, 77, French Olympic cyclist (1928).
- George Weatherill, 85, Australian footballer.

=== 28 ===
- Robbie Basho, 45, American musician, stroke.
- Michel Brusseaux, 72, French footballer.
- James J. DeRan Jr., 79, American politician, member of the Maryland House of Delegates (1943–1950), influenza.
- Edith Ditmas, 89–90, English historian.
- William Dollar, 78, American ballet dancer and choreographer.
- Laura Z. Hobson, 85, American novelist, cancer.
- Robert Lebel, 85, French art historian.
- Mick Moon, 93, Australian soldier, VC recipient.
- Joan Moore, 65–66, British botanist.
- Olof Palme, 59, Swedish politician, prime minister (1969–1976, since 1982), shot.
- Sir Thomas Williams, 70, British politician, MP (1949–1981).
