= Rudolf Moralt =

German conductor

Rudolf Moralt (26 February 1902 – 16 December 1958) was a German conductor, particularly associated with Mozart and the German repertory.

Born in Munich, he studied there with Walter Courvoisier and August Schmid-Lindner, and was engaged as a répétiteur at the Munich State Opera under Bruno Walter and Hans Knappertsbusch from 1919 until 1923.

He was conductor at the opera house of Kaiserslautern (1923–28) and musical director of the opera house in Brno (1932–34). He also worked in Braunschweig and Graz before being appointed chief conductor at the Vienna State Opera in 1940 until his death. In 1942 he made a series of renowned recordings conducting the orchestra of the State Opera with the Austrian soprano Maria Reining.

A reliable, unaffected and deeply sympathetic conductor, Moralt was responsible for a high standard of repertory performances in Vienna for almost twenty years. Though overshadowed by the more famous conductors of his time, he nevertheless achieved many notable performances, especially of works by Mozart, Wagner, Strauss, Pfitzner.

He appeared frequently at the Salzburg Festival, and as guest in many other European cities and in South America. His records include a celebrated Ring Cycle, a notable Don Giovanni and a superbly played Salome which shows how exceptional his musicianship could be when he had adequate rehearsal time. This little-known recording is amongst the best realizations of the opera, marred only by the fresh but slightly flat singing of Wegner.

He died in Vienna, aged 56.

== Sources ==
- Grove Music Online, Gerhard Brunner, May 2008.
