= Ruddell =

Surname

Ruddell is a surname of French and English origin. Notable people with the name include:

- Cec Ruddell (1917–1990), Australian rules footballer
- David Frederick Ruddell Wilson (1871–1957), Irish Anglican priest and hymnist
- Gary Ruddell (born 1951), American artist known for cover paintings for works of science fiction and fantasy literature
- George I. Ruddell (1919–2015), United States Air Force officer
- George Ruddell Black (1865–1942), unionist politician in Northern Ireland
- Isaac Ruddell (1737–1812), 18th-century American Virginia State Line officer during the American Revolutionary War
- Jennifer Ruddell (born 1978), American wheelchair basketball player

== See also ==
- Ruddell, Saskatchewan, village in the Canadian province of Saskatchewan
- Ruddell General Store, historic general store building located at Glenville, Gilmer County, West Virginia
- Ruddle (disambiguation)
