= Franz Rupp =

German-American pianist and accompanist

External audio
- You may listen to Franz Rupp (piano) and Fritz Kreisler (violin) performing Antonin Dvořák's Humoresque Op. 101, No. 7 and Pyotr Tchaikovsky's Andante Cantabile (Quartet in D Major, Op. 11) in 1938 here on archive.org

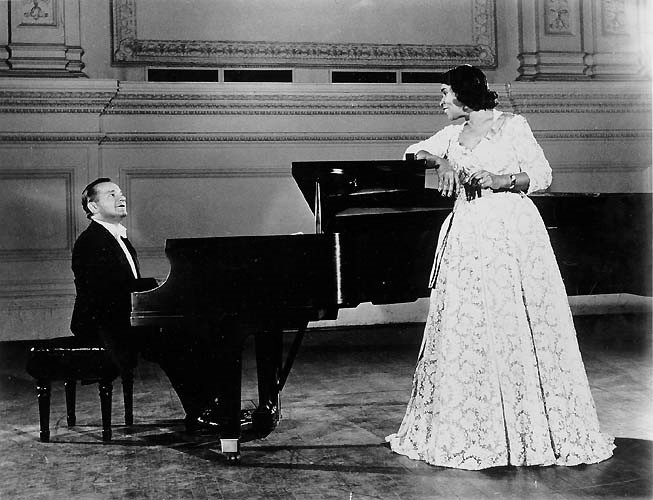
Franz Rupp and Marian Anderson at Carnegie Hall

Franz Rupp (February 24, 1901 – May 27, 1992) was a German-American pianist and accompanist.

== Life ==
Rupp was born in the town of Schongau, Bavaria, the son of Ludwig and Lina Rupp, née Gartner. In 1912 his father was transferred to the revenue office in Munich. Rupp studied at the Akademie der Tonkunst in Munich from 1916 – 1922. Among his teachers were August Schmid-Lindner, Friedrich Klose und Walter Courvoisier. In 1920 he undertook his first American tour with the violinist Willy Burmester. From 1926 he lived in Berlin and established his reputation as an accompanist. He married Warsaw-born opera singer Stephanie Schwarz in 1930. From 1927 to 1934 he was the constant accompanist of the famous German baritone Heinrich Schlusnus, but he fell out with him when the singer made a career under the National Socialists. As Rupp's wife was Jewish he was no longer allowed to perform in public. But he accompanied the outstanding Austrian violinist and composer Fritz Kreisler, with whom he went to tour South America in 1935. Kreisler recorded Beethoven’s complete violin sonatas with Rupp in London in 1935/36.

Rupp also accompanied singers Lotte Lehmann, Sigrid Onégin, Maria Stader and Beniamino Gigli, and was a highly esteemed chamber musician who, among others, performed with cellist Emanuel Feuermann and violist William Primrose. He also played as a soloist with various German conductors, among them Wilhelm Furtwängler.

In 1938 he moved to New York and soon became the permanent accompanist of contralto Marian Anderson, until her retirement from the stage in 1965. Anderson gives credit to Franz and Stephanie Rupp in her autobiography My Lord, What a Morning.

Rupp taught at the Curtis Institute of Music in Philadelphia from 1945 to 1952, and again from 1968.

After the death of his first wife, Rupp married Sylvia Stone in 1976.

His last recording, more than forty years after the famous recording with Fritz Kreisler, was Beethoven's 10 violin sonatas again, this time with the Japanese violinist Takaya Urakawa.

His last public performance took place at the Lockenhaus Festival in Austria in 1985 when he accompanied violist Rivka Golani. Rupp lived in Manhattan until his death at the age of 91. He is survived by his second wife Sylvia.

== Recordings ==
- Isaac Albeniz, Tango from Suite España, op. 165, Georg Kulenkampff, violin, Franz Rupp, piano, Telefunken master 19191
- Ludwig van Beethoven, violin sonatas, Fritz Kreisler, violin, Franz Rupp, piano; HMV D.B 2554-2560, "The Beethoven Violin Sonata Society", 7 records
- Ludwig van Beethoven, violin sonatas, Takaya Urakawa, violin, Franz Rupp, piano; Indie (Japan) B006C0P0W0
- Johannes Brahms, Gestillte Sehnsucht and Geistliches Wiegenlied, Op. 91, Marian Anderson, contralto, William Primrose, viola, Franz Rupp, piano; 2-RCA Victor M 882 (78)
- Carry Me Back to Old Virginny, Marian Anderson, contralto, Gregor Piatigorsky, cello, Franz Rupp, piano
- Georg Friedrich Handel, Caro Mio Ben/Largo from Xerxes, Heinrich Schlusnus, baritone, Franz Rupp, organ, Julius Prüwer, conductor Staatsoper Berlin; Grammophon (66984)
- Franz Liszt, Die drei Zigeuner and O komm im Traum, Theodor Scheidl, baritone, Franz Rupp, piano
- Jules Massenet, Élégie, Marian Anderson, contralto, William Primrose viola, Franz Rupp, piano; Victor 10-1122 in set M 986 (78)
- Felix Mendelssohn-Bartoldy, Sonata no 2 in D major for Violoncello and piano, op. 58, Emanuel Feuermann violoncello, Franz Rupp, piano
- Wolfgang Amadeus Mozart, Adagio E major, KV 261, Georg Kulenkampff, violin, Franz Rupp, piano; Grammophon 67156
- Sergei Rachmaninoff, In the Silent Night, Marian Anderson, contralto, William Primrose, viola, Franz Rupp, piano; Victor 10-1122 in set M 986 (78)
- Franz Schubert, Quintett A major D 667, Franz Rupp piano, Wilhelm Stross violin, Valentin Hartl, viola, Anton Walter, cello, Ludwig Jäger, Bass; Telefunken E 2113/15
- Franz Schubert, An die Musik, Heinrich Schlusnus, baritone, Franz Rupp, piano; Polydor 62644
- Franz Schubert, Frühlingstraum and Gretchen am Spinnrade, Hertha Glatz, contralto, Franz Rupp, piano, 15247 Victor
- Robert Schumann, Die Lotosblume", op 25, No 7, Franz Völker, tenor, Franz Rupp, piano
- Richard Strauß, Allerseelen, op 10, no 8, Franz Völker, tenor, Franz Rupp, piano
- Richard Strauß, op. 29, 1, Traum durch die Dämmerung and op. 28, 1, Freundliche Vision, Heinrich Schlusnus, baritone, Franz Rupp piano; Grammophon 90167
