= John F. Bolt =

U.S. naval aviator and flying ace (1921–2004)

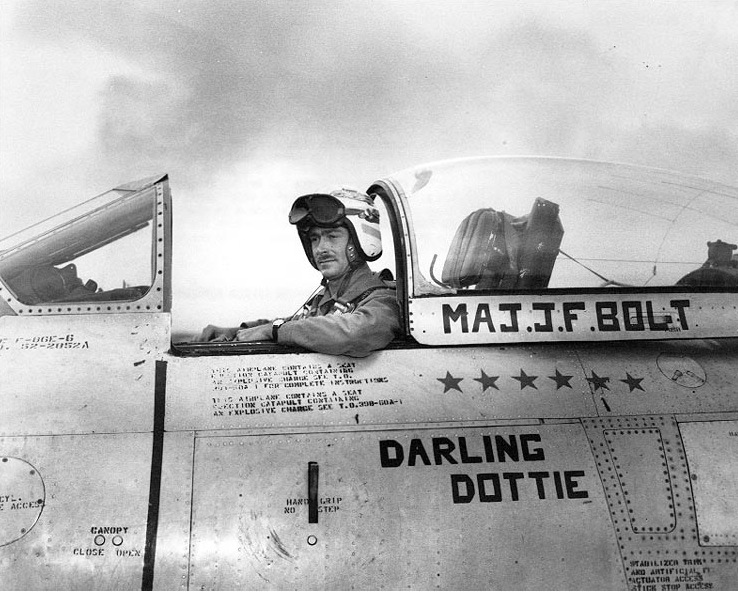
- Bolt in the cockpit of his F-86 Sabre in July 1953
- Born: 19 May 1921; Laurens, South Carolina, U.S.
- Died: 8 September 2004 (aged 83); Tampa, Florida, U.S.
- Burial place: Evergreen Municipal Cemetery; Sanford, Florida, U.S.
- Military career
- Branch: United States Marine Corps
- Service years: 1941–1962
- Rank: Lieutenant colonel
- Nicknames: "Jack" "Blot" "Duke of Mukden"
- Service number: O-13522
- Units: VMF-211; VMF-471; VMF-215; VMF-224; 39th Fighter-Interceptor Squadron
- Commands: VMA-214
- Conflicts: World War II; Marshall Islands campaign; New Guinea campaign; Korean War; MiG Alley
- Awards: Navy Cross; Distinguished Flying Cross (3); Air Medal (2)
- Other work: Lawyer

John Franklin Bolt (19 May 1921 – 8 September 2004) was a naval aviator in the United States Marine Corps and a decorated flying ace who served during World War II and the Korean War. He remains the only U.S. Marine to achieve ace status in two wars and was also the only Marine jet fighter ace. He rose to the rank of lieutenant colonel during his military career.

Born to a poor family in Laurens, South Carolina, Bolt was a self-described "workaholic" and was involved in numerous groups and social activities throughout his life. After dropping out of the University of Florida for financial reasons in 1941, he joined the US Navy and trained as a Marine Corps pilot. Sent to the Pacific Theater of Operations, he flew an F4U Corsair during the campaigns in the Marshall Islands and New Guinea, claiming six victories against Japanese A6M Zeros.

Bolt continued his service through the Korean War, entering combat through an exchange program with the United States Air Force (USAF) in late 1952. Over a period of several weeks in mid-1953, he led flights of F-86 Sabres into combat with MiG-15s of the Chinese Air Force, scoring six victories during fights along the northern border of North Korea, commonly known as "MiG Alley," giving him a total of 12 victories over his career.

Bolt stayed in the Marine Corps until 1962, serving as an analyst and instructor in his later career, before retiring and earning a Juris Doctor degree from the University of Florida. He subsequently settled down in Florida and began a private real estate law practice; he continued to be active in law until 1991. He died from leukemia in 2004.

== Early years ==
John Bolt was born on 19 May 1921 in Laurens, South Carolina, to Thomas Crews Bolt and Emma Bruce Bolt (née Bagwell). John had a younger brother, Bruce. In 1924 the family moved to Sanford, Florida. In his youth, John Bolt gained the nickname "Jack" from his friends and family. His family was poor and he was for the most part responsible for providing his own clothes and social expenses from the time he was ten years old. He worked several part-time jobs, at one point working 30 to 40 hours a week at a local creamery in addition to attending school. He also enrolled in the Boy Scouts, eventually attaining the rank of Star Scout.

In June 1939, Bolt began attending Seminole High School. Described as modest and hardworking by his high school classmates, he was elected class president in his final two years in school.

Bolt attended the University of Florida, majoring in accounting and meeting most of the costs himself using money that he had saved while working through high school. He joined Phi Eta Sigma, an honor society and professional fraternity, and Alpha Tau Omega, a social fraternity. In 1941, his brother Bruce also enrolled at Florida, straining the family's expenses; John dropped out after his second year so that his brother could complete his degree. Bolt enlisted in the Marine Corps Reserve in April 1941 to train as a pilot, but deferred his training when the Marine Corps offered him the chance to finish college and attend law school, paying him US$500 a year to do so.

== World War II ==
Bolt left for basic training in June 1941. Though he intended to join the US Marine Corps, he signed up for the US Navy Flight Training Program, which would allow him to fly for the Marines. On completion of his basic training in November 1941, he was selected as a pilot, and moved to Naval Air Station Atlanta, Georgia in February 1942. He was placed on active duty just before the attack on Pearl Harbor and the United States' entry into World War II. Completing his initial pilot training and transferring to Naval Air Station Jacksonville, Florida for the next phase, he started flight training in the SNJ Texan. He also qualified to fly in the N3N Canary trainer aircraft. His final phase of flight lessons occurred in Naval Air Station Miami in Miami, Florida, where he flew the Grumman F3F, a biplane which was the navy's most advanced trainer at the time. Bolt completed this training on 18 July 1942, and was commissioned as a second lieutenant in the U.S. Marine Corps, receiving his aviator wings that day as well.

Around this time, Bolt began dating Dorothy E. Wiggins, whom he knew from Sanford. The two married after two years of dating, and they eventually had two children together, Robert and Barbara. Years later, during the Korean War, Bolt had the words "Darling Dottie" stencilled on the side of his North American F-86 Sabre jet as a tribute to his wife.

After commissioning, Bolt was assigned as a cadet training instructor, training aviation cadets at Naval Air Station Jacksonville and at Naval Auxiliary Air Station Green Cove Springs, Florida, until December 1942, when the unit was deactivated. Until May 1943 he was trained on the F4F Wildcat, a carrier-based aircraft, in preparation for movement to a front-line combat unit. Over the next few months, Bolt was stationed at Naval Air Station Glenview in Glenview, Illinois, where he trained for 60 hours aboard the paddlewheel aircraft carrier USS Wolverine. After qualifying to operate carrier-based aircraft, he was assigned to Marine Corps Air Station Miramar in San Diego, California, until June 1943, when he and his class departed for the Pacific Theater aboard the USS Rochambeau.

=== Formation of VMF-214 ===
On his way to the front lines, Bolt traveled to a number of islands as the Rochambeau stopped at New Caledonia and New Hebrides to avoid Japanese submarines. Upon arrival at Espiritu Santo, Bolt was placed in a pool of new officers who were intended to replace casualties in several squadrons. Casualties at this time proved to be less than expected, so the replacement pool was used to form a new squadron. The new unit was designated VMF-214, and became known as the "Black Sheep" because its pilots had originally not been assigned to a squadron. Under the command of Major Pappy Boyington, the unit was equipped with F4U Corsairs. Moved after several months to the Russell Islands, they were ready for combat by 13 September. Bolt flew the aircraft every chance he got, and although new to the war in the Pacific, Bolt had over 700 hours flying in the F4U Corsair by September, more than many combat pilots accrued in two combat tours.

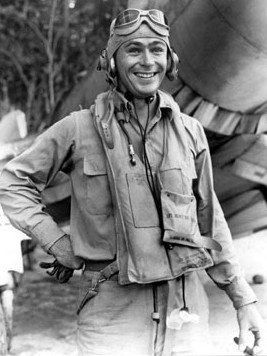
Bolt in the South Pacific, 1943

On 14 September, the squadron began flying missions to escort B-24 Liberator bombers. The Japanese had 200 aircraft at Kahili Airfield and Balalae Island, opposed by only 50 aircraft from the U.S. squadrons in the area. The first couple of missions that the squadron undertook were relatively quiet but, on 16 September, VMF-214 was attacked by a group of 35 Japanese A6M Zeros. The squadron repelled the strike, destroying 11 Japanese aircraft for the loss of only one of their own. Several costly engagements with the strong Japanese forces in the area followed. Bolt did not score any victories during this time, but was promoted to first lieutenant that month.

=== Marshall Islands ===
Bolt got his first victories of the deployment on 23 September when he was with a flight of 15 VMF-214 aircraft escorting B-24 Liberators back from a raid on Kahili. The bombers had been followed by 20 to 30 Zeros, and a dogfight quickly ensued. During the course of the engagement over Bougainville, Bolt scored two victories. His wingman, Ed Harper, also claimed a victory. For the next several weeks, the squadron operated out of Munda in the Solomon Islands.

A self-described "workaholic" Bolt was considered by the other pilots to be the most energetic member of the squadron. He took to collecting and sending home keepsakes from daily life on the front lines; he and two other pilots were known as the "Quartermaster Kids" because they collected so many souvenirs and shipped them home. He could often be found in the harbor near their airstrip dynamiting fish and was known to organize many of the squadron's pig roasts and beer parties. Bolt also took it upon himself to test out many different ammunition configurations for the .50 caliber guns on the F4U during his free time. His research was conducted by firing rounds into 50-gallon drums partially filled with gasoline and at abandoned aircraft in the Espiritu Santo boneyard. He found that incendiary rounds were more effective, and convinced his squadron, and eventually most of the aircraft squadrons in the Pacific Theater, to begin firing six incendiary rounds for every one armor-piercing or tracer round, rather than firing one for one.

Bolt became well known—but also drew the ire of his squadron's commanding officer—during what began as an escort mission for B-24 Liberators. The bombers were lost in the clouds and the flight ran into poor weather, forcing them to turn back. During the flight home, the U.S. pilots noticed much Japanese surface traffic but did not engage because of the weather. On their way back to Munda one of the aircraft had a mechanical problem, and a group including Bolt had to land at Barakoma Airfield on Vella Lavella. He tried to convince others to go with him to attack the ships they had seen, but they refused. He refueled and took off, against Boyington's orders, and destroyed four enemy barges and strafed several ground concentrations in the vicinity of Tonolei Harbor before returning to Munda. Disobeying a direct order drew Boyington's wrath until the next day, when a telegram was received from Admiral William "Bull" Halsey: "That one man war ... conducted by Lieut Bolt against Jap stuff in Tonolei, warm heart (stop) Halsey."

On 17 October, during a mission over Kahili Airfield, Bolt's squadron was ambushed by Japanese fighters. Bolt downed one of the Japanese aircraft in his last mission before a scheduled rest and recuperation (R&R) in Sydney, Australia.

=== Vella Lavella ===
During the last war, the Corsairs would have to make running passes at the Japanese Zeros, being careful never to really tangle with them because the Zeros could turn on a dime. In Korea, the MiGs made the passes and we made the turns, especially at higher altitudes.

— Bolt reflecting on his World War II tactics in 1953.

When the squadron returned from its R&R, Bolt had been promoted to captain and the squadron had been relocated to Vella Lavella. The new base was within 150 miles (240 km) of Rabaul, which was the center of Japanese activity on New Britain, and was the squadron's next primary target. Defended by 98,000 Japanese troops, the island was of great strategic importance as it had a harbor and several airfields and was within striking distance of the Marshall Islands, defended by 400 Japanese aircraft.

On 23 December, 16 Corsairs from VMF-214 formed part of a force of 120 U.S. fighters and bombers that undertook a mission over Rabaul. The strike against the city and harbor areas was countered by a large force of Japanese aircraft. While defending the bombers, Bolt shot down two more Japanese aircraft, making him the squadron's sixth flying ace. Two days later, he took part in another mission during which his squadron mates claimed four victories, bringing VMF-214's tally of confirmed aerial victories to 76.

On 3 January 1944, VMF-214 was among 75 U.S. aircraft raiding near Rabaul when they were surprised by 300 Japanese aircraft. Boyington was shot down and parachuted into the St. George's Channel. The next day, Bolt led a flight of four Corsairs from VMF-214 in search of Boyington. Despite hazy weather and the need to take an indirect route to avoid Japanese radar, Bolt managed to lead the flight to the area where the battle had taken place the day before. Although they did not spot Boyington, they discovered and engaged a flotilla of Japanese barges, destroying six of them. Bolt also claimed his sixth victory against a Japanese aircraft attempting to defend the barges.

Bolt's tour, along with the rest of VMF-214, came to an end on 8 January 1944, five days after Boyington was shot down and captured by the Japanese. VMF-214 was disbanded and its pilots assigned to other units. In his time with VMF-214, Bolt developed a reputation among his peers as a leader and an accomplished pilot. He was awarded the Distinguished Flying Cross twice, and scored a total of six confirmed victories and one probable victory and two aircraft damaged in his 92 missions with the squadron.

=== Subsequent assignments ===
Bolt was reassigned to VMF-211, at an airfield on Nissan Island in the Green Islands, 75 miles (121 km) north of Bougainville and 100 miles (160 km) west of Rabaul. The aircraft there were primarily concerned with the destruction of convoys and ships. The missions, nicknamed "Truck Busters", were very successful, but at the cost of damaged aircraft and wounded crewmen, including Bolt's wingman. This tour lasted until May 1944 when Bolt returned to Marine Corps Air Station Santa Barbara with his squadron.

Reassigned, Bolt flew to Hawaii, then to Long Beach, California. He reunited with Dorothy Wiggins in San Francisco, and the two married on 23 May 1944 in Oakland, before going on a one-month honeymoon. His next assignment was with the newly formed VMF-471 at Marine Corps Air Station El Toro. While posted to VMF-471, he attended the Aviation Ground Officer's School at Marine Corps Air Station Quantico, Virginia, from November 1944 through February 1945. He saw no combat for the rest of the war, but did manage to break the Corsair endurance record by keeping an aircraft aloft for 14 hours and 9 seconds. After briefly returning to VMF-471, Bolt was reassigned to VMF-215 in March 1945, tasked with training pilots for new carrier-based aircraft. He remained in this role until V-J Day, the end of hostilities.

Following the war, Bolt served in various units around El Toro. He was at various times assigned to MASG-46, VMF-512, VMF-323, VMF-312, VMF-452, and Marine Aircraft Group 12 (MAG-12), before transferring to Quantico again in November 1949 to attend the Aircraft Maintenance Course. Diving in Florida's Tampa Bay on leave, Bolt (then a captain) set a world spearfishing record when he caught an Atlantic goliath grouper weighing hundreds of pounds.

== Korean War ==
In May 1950, Bolt was reassigned to VMF-224 at Marine Corps Air Station Cherry Point, North Carolina, and he remained there until May 1951. The squadron flew the F2H Banshee and within three months of joining the unit he had flown more hours on the aircraft than any other pilot in the squadron. This was followed by a quick four-month tour on the staff at the 2nd Marine Aircraft Wing. During this time, the US Air Force was operating its first squadron of F-86 Sabre aircraft. The Sabres were the only U.S. aircraft which performed well against the MiG-15s operated by China and North Korea in the Korean War. Bolt used his connections to enter an exchange program with the USAF in September 1951, becoming an exchange officer with the 318th Fighter-Interceptor Squadron at McChord Air Force Base in Washington flying the F-94 Starfire. Soon after, he began piloting the F-86F Sabre which had been transferred to the squadron. He continued training with the squadron and was promoted to major in December 1951.

=== Fighter-bomber missions ===
In November 1952, Bolt transferred to squadron VMF-115, an element of the 1st Marine Aircraft Wing flying F9F Panther fighter-bomber aircraft in South Korea. He flew 94 combat missions with the squadron, all of them in bombing runs and close air support and air strike missions against ground targets. He did not enjoy this duty, preferring instead to fly the Sabre in air-to-air combat. As his squadron headed to Japan for R&R, he traveled to Seoul to visit the 4th Fighter-Interceptor Wing at Kimpo Airfield.

At the 4th Wing, Bolt met with its commander, Colonel Royal N. Baker, who refused his request to fly in combat units. He then went to the 51st Fighter-Interceptor Wing at Suwon Air Base to observe its operations, where he met with George I. Ruddell, an acquaintance from El Toro, who was commanding the 39th Fighter-Interceptor Squadron. Ruddell agreed to let Bolt join his unit as part of another officer exchange. This apparently angered some of his commanders in VMF-115, and Bolt only completed a requisite six weeks of duty with the wing prior to its next R&R.

=== Exchange and combat ===
It was about one Saturday evening when I added those last two. We hadn't seen anything of the MiGs in over 10 days—when all of a sudden I spotted four of them taking off from an air base on the other side of the Yalu. I nosed over and hit them just as they began to gain altitude. I fired four bursts and a MiG began to smoke. It rolled over and slipped into the ground. I made the second kill when this other dude drifted my way. Pulling nose-up, I closed to within 500 feet (150 m) and started firing up his tailpipe. I saw the pilot eject himself and the action was over. It took about 5 minutes for the whole show.

— Bolt reflecting on the 11 July 1953 engagement.

Six weeks later, Bolt again turned down his R&R and joined the 39th Fighter-Interceptor Squadron, flying the F-86 Sabre. Ruddell assigned him to First Lieutenant Joseph C. McConnell, who would be the top ace in the war. Bolt and McConnell quickly established a close friendship in spite of Bolt's superior rank, and he attributed his success in Korea to McConnell's guidance. Ruddell sent a request to Lieutenant General Glenn O. Barcus, commander of the Fifth United States Air Force, that Bolt's tour with the squadron be extended. The request was granted, and McConnell and Bolt began going on combat missions together as wingmen in MiG Alley, the area in northwestern Korea where air-to-air combat was most frequent. Bolt's Sabre, tail number 52-2582, was named Darling Dottie.

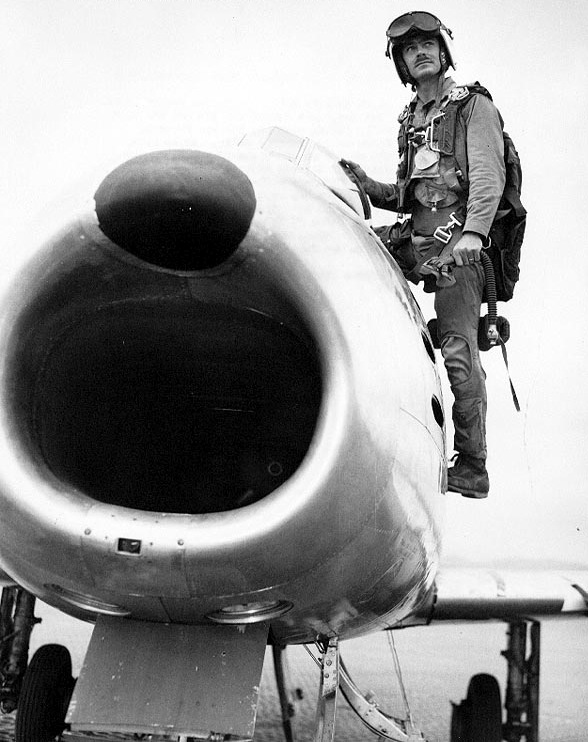
Bolt disembarks from his F-86 Sabre in Korea several days after his fifth and sixth victories in July 1953.

By May, McConnell was rotated back to the United States and Bolt was given charge of the flight; in 16 combat missions and 27 combat hours, his flight had never engaged any MiG fighters. This changed on 16 May, when the flight was attacked by a group of MiG fighters at 45,000 feet (14,000 m). He was quickly tailed by one of the aircraft, but managed to avoid its fire and tail another MiG himself. With several well placed shots, Bolt forced its pilot to bail out. Six days later on 22 May, MiG aircraft attacked again, and he managed to outmaneuver a fighter which had been attacking his wingman and shoot it down at 7,000 feet (2,100 m). On 24 June, he flew his 31st combat mission, during which he engaged a single MiG and shot it down after a quick battle in the vicinity of the Yalu River. A week later on 30 June, he was flying another mission in the same area when he spotted and quickly shot down another MiG. By the end of the month, he had credit for four victories and two aircraft "damaged".

On 11 July, Bolt led another flight of four fighters in a reconnaissance mission above Sinuiju, his 37th combat mission of the deployment. Two of the aircraft departed after their fuel tanks were depleted, leaving him with one wingman to continue the patrol. Soon after, the two pilots spotted a formation of four MiGs taking off from Antung airfield on the Chinese side of the Yalu River. Despite being low on fuel, Bolt ordered an attack. He made a head-on dive toward the formation, which was attempting to gain altitude, and downed the leading airplane with four machine gun bursts. He then banked his aircraft and aimed for the second aircraft in the formation, continuing the attack and scoring hits on its fuselage. The pilot bailed out, and the remaining two MiGs fled. Within the first five minutes of the engagement, Bolt shot down two of the MiGs. This brought his tally of confirmed victories during the war to six. For these actions he became the final Marine aviator to be awarded the Navy Cross during the war. Bolt is the only non-USAF pilot to become an ace in the F-86 and the only naval aviator to become an ace in two wars. Shortly after this final mission, his tour of duty ended and he was rotated back to the United States for an extended rest and vacation, which he spent with his family.

== Later Marine Corps career ==
Following his return from Korea, Bolt was assigned to the U.S. Navy Bureau of Aeronautics in Washington, D.C., as an aircraft design engineer. In this duty, he was detailed to The Pentagon and a board which reported on aircraft performance and tactics. A press conference was held in September 1953 to welcome him to the position, and during this he recounted stories from his service in Korea for the first time to local newspapers. Bolt's experiences in World War II and the Korean War were used to help shape air combat doctrine. He worked in this assignment for around a year, until 1954 when he was promoted to lieutenant colonel and moved to the Naval Pilot Test Center at Naval Air Station Patuxent River, in St. Mary's County, Maryland. During this time, he took evening classes at the University of Maryland, eventually earning a Bachelor of Science in Military History.

In 1957, Bolt was ordered to Marine Corps Base Quantico to attend a one-year course at the Senior School of Amphibious Warfare as part of a program which would later be incorporated into the accredited curriculum of the Marine Corps University. On 5 November, after this one-year stint, he was assigned to command VMF-214, his World War II squadron, at Marine Corps Air Station Kaneohe Bay on the Hawaiian Islands. The squadron, which was part of Marine Aircraft Group 13, flew the FJ-4 Fury; Bolt remained in command of it until 14 August 1959. His final assignment as an instructor was at the Senior School of Amphibious Warfare at Quantico. He taught at this school for the final three years of his career, before retiring from the Marine Corps on 31 March 1962.

== Later life ==
To our fallen companions whose bones rest on the bottom of the sea in the Solomon Islands, cut down in the bloom of youth, denied the pleasures of life, which by chance, the rest of us have enjoyed. To Gregory Boyington, the courageous, charismatic leader of our days of glory. To Frank Walton, who from our early days has not only been our Boswell, our biographer, in creating the Black Sheep legend, but by his own life has been friend, inspiration and role model to all. To Jim Reames our compassionate squadron doctor, whose medical treatment, Lejon brandy and cheerful good humor helped each of us to bear the stress of combat when death was a frequent visitor to our squadron. To our wives and ladies without whom life would have been a fruitless, cheerless existence without meaning. To each of us, once a proud, brave brotherhood in arms, today we are bound by our own actions in the Black Sheep legend as friends forever. Last to our beloved Marine Corps. We all knew when we put on the forest green uniform that it would ask us to put our lives at risk, which it did, and it would give us only pride and self respect, which it has.

— Bolt's toast at the VMF-214 50-year reunion in 1993.

After retiring from the Marine Corps, Bolt, then 40 years old, began a new career in agriculture. He and his wife moved back to Sanford, Florida, where he worked for Chase & Co. He remained in that position for five years, until 1967. That year, he decided to follow his original career aspirations to be a lawyer. He enrolled in the College of Law at the University of Florida, where his son Robert was also in attendance. The two formed an American handball team during their spare time, and won several tournaments. Bolt's program had a three-year curriculum, but he completed the degree in 27 months, graduating with a Juris Doctor degree in December 1969. For two years after graduation, he stayed with the university to teach, and from 1969 to 1971 he was a law professor as well as the president of the Board of Trustees of Alpha Tau Omega, the fraternity he had joined while an undergraduate at the university.

After this stint as an instructor, Bolt and his wife moved to New Smyrna Beach, a place both of them had enjoyed in their childhoods. He began a private law practice and became a local property owner. During this time he was described as a "softspoken, kind, gentle person who would go out of his way to help a friend or a stranger." He specialized in real estate law and was the attorney for the city's utilities commission for 13 years. He retired from law in 1991.

Bolt subsequently lived a quiet life and kept frequent contact with his children. Robert became a lawyer in Tampa, Florida, and Barbara wrote for Reader's Digest. In May 1993, Bolt attended the 50th reunion of the original "Black Sheep" or the 8th Fighter Squadron in New Orleans, Louisiana, and gave the toast at the beginning of the festivities. In 2003, he was inducted into the American Combat Airman Hall of Fame at the American Airpower Heritage Museum in Midland, Texas.

Bolt died of acute leukemia in Tampa on 8 September 2004 after fleeing the approaching Hurricane Frances. At the time of his death, he was the last surviving of the seven Americans to become aces in both World War II and Korea. He was survived by his wife and children, as well as two grandchildren.

== Aerial victory credits ==
Bolt scored a total of 12 confirmed aerial victories during his career, with an additional "probable" victory and two aircraft damaged. He was the only U.S. Marine Corps pilot to become an ace in the Korean War, and remains the only U.S. Marine Corps pilot to be an ace in two wars. Bolt was one of 1,297 World War II aces from the United States with six confirmed victories during that war. He later became one of 40 Korean War aces from the United States with six more confirmed victories during that war.

Bolt is one of seven U.S. pilots who achieved ace status as both a piston-engined pilot in World War II and as a jet pilot in Korea. The others are all USAF pilots: Francis S. Gabreski, James P. Hagerstrom, William T. Whisner, Vermont Garrison and Harrison Thyng, as well as George A. Davis, Jr.

Date	#	Type	Location	Aircraft flown	Unit
23 September 1943	2	A6M Zero	Bougainville	F4U Corsair	VMF-214
17 October 1943	1	A6M Zero	Bougainville	F4U Corsair	VMF-214
23 December 1943	2	A6M Zero	New Ireland	F4U Corsair	VMF-214
4 January 1944	1	A6M Zero	Rabaul	F4U Corsair	VMF-214
16 May 1953	1	MiG 15	North Korea	F-86E Sabre	39th FIS, 51st FIW
22 June 1953	1	MiG 15	North Korea	F-86E Sabre	39th FIS, 51st FIW
24 June 1953	1	MiG 15	North Korea	F-86E Sabre	39th FIS, 51st FIW
30 June 1953	1	MiG 15	North Korea	F-86E Sabre	39th FIS, 51st FIW
11 July 1953	2	MiG 15	North Korea	F-86E Sabre	39th FIS, 51st FIW

== Military awards ==
Bolt was decorated during World War II and the Korean War. His military decorations and awards include:

Naval Aviator Badge
Navy Cross
Distinguished Flying Cross with two gold 5/16 inch stars	Air Medal with one gold 5/16 inch star	Combat Action Ribbon with one gold 5/16 inch star
Navy Presidential Unit Citation	Navy Unit Commendation	American Defense Service Medal
American Campaign Medal	Asiatic–Pacific Campaign Medal with two bronze campaign stars	World War II Victory Medal
Army of Occupation Medal with 'Japan' clasp	National Defense Service Medal with one bronze service star	Korean Service Medal with three bronze campaign stars
Republic of Korea Presidential Unit Citation	United Nations Korea Medal	Korean War Service Medal (Note: In 2000 this award was made retroactive to all U.S. military personnel who served in the Korean War.(Korean Service Medal, United States Navy, archived from the original on 23 January 2012)

=== Navy Cross citation ===
The Navy Cross is presented to John F. Bolt. (0-13522) Lt Colonel, U.S. Marine Corps for extraordinary heroism in connection with military operations against an armed enemy of the united Nations while attached to the First Marine Aircraft Wing and serving as a pilot of a plane in the THIRTY NINTH Fighter-Interceptor Squadron, Fifth Air Force, in action against enemy aggressor forces in the Republic of Korea on 11 July 1953. Sighting four hostile jet interceptors immediately after the second section of his four-plane flight was forced to retire from the area because of a low fuel supply during a reconnaissance mission deep in enemy territory. Major Bolt quickly maneuvered his aircraft and that of his wingman into attack position and deliberately engaged the numerically superior enemy in a head-on firing run, destroying one of the hostile planes with his initial burst of fire. Although his fuel supply was dangerously low, he initiated repeated attacks on the remaining enemy aircraft and severely damaging the engine section of the lead interceptor, routinely pressed his attack against the crippled plane until the enemy pilot was forced to bail out. By his exceptional courage and superb airmanship in destroying the two aircraft, Major Bolt raised his total of enemy jet planes destroyed during the Korean War to six, thereby becoming the first jet ace in Marine Corps aviation. His inspiring leadership and great personal valor reflect the highest credit upon himself and was in keeping with the highest traditions of the United States Naval Service.
For the President, /S/ Robert Bernard Anderson, Secretary of the Navy.

== See also ==
- List of historically notable United States Marines
- List of Korean War flying aces
- List of World War II aces from the United States
- List of Navy Cross recipients for the Korean War
- United States Marine Corps Aviation

== Citations ==
=== Sources ===
- Astor, Gerald (2005), Semper Fi in the Sky – The Marine Air Battles of World War II, New York City: Random House, ISBN 978-0-89141-877-1
- Baron, Scott; Wise, James E. (2007), The Navy Cross: Extraordinary Heroism in Iraq, Afghanistan and Other Conflicts, Annapolis, Maryland: Naval Institute Press, ISBN 978-1-59114-945-3
- Dorr, Robert F. (2005), Marine Air – The History of the Flying Leathernecks in Words and Photos, London, United Kingdom: Penguin, ISBN 978-0-425-20725-3
- Gamble, Bruce (1998), The Black Sheep: The Definitive Account of Marine Fighting Squadron 214 in World War II, Novato, California: Presidio Press, ISBN 978-0-89141-825-2
- Lorenz, William E.; Oliver, Dwight L. (1999), The Inner Seven: The History of Seven Unique American Combat 'Aces' of World War II and Korea, Nashville, Tennessee: Turner Publishing Company, ISBN 978-1-56311-504-2
- Mersky, Peter B. (1983), U.S. Marine Corps Aviation – 1912 to the Present, Mount Pleasant, South Carolina: Nautical and Aviation Publishing Company of America, ISBN 978-0-933852-39-6
- Reed, Robert T. (2001), Lost Black Sheep: The Search for WWII Ace Chris Magee, Central Point, Oregon: Hellgate Press, ISBN 978-1-55571-549-6
- Walton, Frank (1986), Once They Were Eagles: The Men of the Black Sheep Squadron, Lexington, Kentucky: University Press of Kentucky, ISBN 978-0-8131-0875-9
- Werrell, Kenneth P. (2005), Sabres Over MiG Alley: The F-86 and the Battle for Air Superiority in Korea, Annapolis, Maryland: Naval Institute Press, ISBN 978-1-59114-933-0
