= VMF-471 =

Marine Fighting Squadron 471
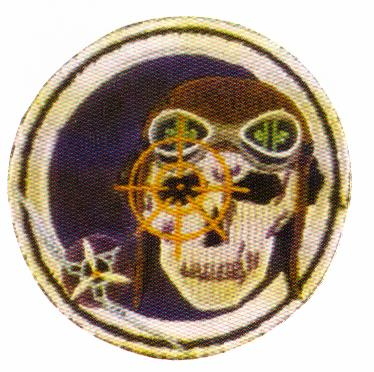
- VMF-471 Insignia
- Active: 15 May 1944 – 10 Sep 1945
- Country: United States
- Allegiance: United States of America
- Branch: United States Marine Corps
- Type: Fighter squadron
- Role: Air interdiction Close air support
- Part of: Inactive

Aircraft flown
- Fighter: Vought F4U Corsair

Marine Fighting Squadron 471 (VMF-471) was a short-lived fighter squadron of the United States Marine Corps during World War II. The squadron served as a Fleet Replacement Squadron tasked with training new naval aviators to fly the Vought F4U Corsair. The squadron did not participate in combat action during the war and was decommissioned after approximately 16 months of service on 10 September 1945. No other Marine Corps squadron has carried VMF-471's lineage and honors since that time.

== History ==
Marine Fighting Squadron 471 (VMF-471) was commissioned on 15 May 1944 at Marine Corps Air Station El Centro, California by authority of CominChf confidential dispatch serial 081915 AvPlngDir 24-KV-44. The squadron originally fell under the command of Marine Aircraft Base Defense Group 43. On 23 July 1944 a detachment from the squadron was sent to a new base, Marine Corps Outlying Field Camp Pendleton, California. For the flight there, 23 of the squadron's F4U Corsairs formed the numbers 4 - 7 - 1 in the sky and flew from MCAS El Centro to Pasadena, CA in order to get to get filmed by Newsreel cameras and then continued on to MCOLF Camp Pendleton.

On 10 October 1944, personnel and equipment from VMF-471, minus aircraft, were transferred to Marine Aircraft Base Defense Group 46 at Marine Corps Air Station El Toro, CA. The squadron fell in on the aircraft that belonged to VMF-482, a squadron that had recently been decommissioned. On 16 October, the squadron was officially designated as a training squadron. In December, the detachment at Pendleton which at its peak had 31 F4U Corsairs and 3 SBD divebombers rejoined the squadron at MCAS El Toro. On 10 September 1945, authorized by Marine Fleet Air, West Coast (MFAWC) dispatch 072333 dated 8 September 1945 and Commanding General, MWAFC dispatch 08184 dated 8 September 1945 the squadron was decommissioned.

== Accidents ==
- 31 August 1944 - 2ndLt James W. Randell was killed in a crash involving 3 x F4U Corsairs in the vicinity of El Centro, CA.
- 26 October 1944 - 1stLt Richard C. Englund's F4U Corsair was declared lost at sea when he failed to return from a training mission.

== Notable former members ==
- John F. Bolt - the only U.S. Marine to achieve ace status in two wars and also the only Marine jet fighter ace served as an instructor with the squadron.

== Commanding Officers ==
The following naval aviators served as commanding officers of VMF-472 during its existence:

- 1stLt Harold G. Sandbach - 15-21 May 1944
- Capt Warren J. Turner - 22 May 1944 – 8 June 1944
- Maj Robert B. Fraser - 9 June 1944 – 30 November 1944
- Maj Horace A. Pehl - 1 December 1944 – 20 May 1945
- Maj Arthur T. Werner - 21 May 1945 – 15 June 1945
- Maj John R. Spooner - 16 June 1945 – 5 July 1945
- Maj Robert J. Holm - 6-23 July 1945
- Maj Hugh I. Russell - 24 July 1945 – 10 September 1945

== Unit awards ==
A unit citation or commendation is an award bestowed upon an organization for the action cited. Members of the unit who participated in said actions are allowed to wear on their uniforms the awarded unit citation. VMF-471 was presented with the following awards:

Ribbon	Unit Award
	World War II Victory Medal

== See also ==
- United States Marine Corps Aviation
- List of active United States Marine Corps aircraft squadrons
- List of decommissioned United States Marine Corps aircraft squadrons
