= Bonn (Stadtbezirk) =

Municipal district Stadtbezirk of Bonn

- Borough of Bonn
- Coat of arms

- Bonn within Bonn
- Interactive map of Bonn
- Location within Germany Location within North Rhine-Westphalia
- Coordinates: 50°42′44″N 07°05′15″E
- Country: Germany
- State: North Rhine-Westphalia
- Admin. region: Cologne
- District: Urban district
- City: Bonn

Area
  - Total: 64.2 km^{2} (24.8 sq mi)

Population (2020-12-31)
  - Total: 155,235
  - Density: 2,420/km^{2} (6,260/sq mi)
- Time zone: UTC+01:00 (CET)
  - Summer (DST): UTC+02:00 (CEST)
- Dialling codes: 0228
- Vehicle registration: BN

Bonn is a city borough (Stadtbezirk) of Bonn, Germany. It has a population of 155,235 (2020).

== Subdivisions ==
Bonn is composed of the following sub-districts:

- Auerberg
- Bonn-Castell
- Bonn-Zentrum
- Buschdorf
- Dottendorf
- Dransdorf
- Endenich
- Graurheindorf
- Gronau
- Ippendorf
- Kessenich
- Lessenich/Meßdorf
- Nordstadt
- Poppelsdorf
- Röttgen
- Südstadt
- Tannenbusch
- Ückesdorf
- Venusberg
- Weststadt

== Twin towns – sister cities ==
Beuel is twinned with:

- Budafok-Tétény (Budapest), Hungary
- Oxford, England, United Kingdom
