= Ruddle =

Ruddle may refer to:

- Red ochre, a red pigment
- Ruddle, West Virginia, a rural area in the eastern United States
- Francis Ruddle (1798–1882), English master builder
- Frank Ruddle (1929–2013), American biologist
- James Ruddle (born 1981), Canadian artist
- Marcus Ruddle (1905–1986), Irish cricketer
- Priscilla Ruddle (born 1976), Australian volleyball player

== See also ==
- Ruddell
