= Hans Haug =

Swiss composer and conductor

Hans Haug (27 July 1900 in Basel – 15 September 1967 in Lausanne) was a Swiss composer and conductor, mainly of operas and theatrical music. He also became known as a composer for the classical guitar.

== Life ==
Haug studied at the Basel Conservatory with Egon Petri and Ernst Lévy as well as at the Munich Musikhochschule, where he studied with Ferruccio Busoni, Walter Courvoisier and Josef Pembaur. After short-term engagements as conductor in Grenchen and Solothurn, he became Second 'Kapellmeister' at the municipal orchestra and the theatre of Basel (1928–1934). He conducted the Orchestre de la Radio Suisse Romande (1935–1938) and the Radio Orchestra Beromünster (1938–1943). In 1947, he succeeded Alexandre Denéréaz at the Lausanne Conservatory. In the years following World War II, he resumed an international conducting career and also his compositional interest in opera. Haug's catalogue of works is immense and includes operas, oratorios, symphonic works, concertos and film music in addition to string quartets, various chamber works, vocal music, as well as compositions for or including the guitar. Föllmi claims that Haug has been first and foremost a composer for the stage.

== Guitar works ==
In December 1950, Haug's Concertino for Guitar and Chamber Orchestra won a prize at a composition competition for guitar at the Accademia Musicale Chigiana in Siena, Italy. It was Haug's first guitar composition. The prizewinners were promised that Segovia would premiere their pieces in the summer of 1952 and that they would be published afterwards by Schott of London. Whereas this promise was kept in the case of Tansman's Cavatina (Schott published it in 1952), Segovia never played Haug's Concertino, which had to await publication until three years after Haug's death in 1970. It appeared in a facsimile edition under the auspices of Edizioni Musicali Bèrben. Alexandre Lagoya and the Lausanne Chamber Orchestra played its world premiere.

Encouraged by his prize in the Siena competition, Haug continued to explore the guitar. He took guitar lessons on a regular basis with José de Azpiazu from October 1953 to January 1954 in order to learn more about the instrument. His first composition for solo guitar, Alba, and possibly his 'Preludio' as well (which Segovia later called 'Postlude'), were written around this time. Apparently, Alba was in Segovia's possession shortly thereafter; in a letter from Assisi dated 19 September 1954, he apologizes to Gagnebin for having studied only one work of his: "Please be aware that I am also behind in my work on the other pieces by Villa-Lobos, Tansman, Haug, Rodrigo, Torroba, Castelnuovo, etc. You will not see any premieres at all on the programs of my next concerts (...)." Later, Segovia did record Alba and Postlude (Decca DL 9832). This was Segovia's only recording of any of Haug's works.

In 1961, Segovia asked Haug to teach some composition courses at the summer music academy in Santiago de Compostela, and it was here that Haug completed his Prélude, Tiento et Toccata on 28 September 1961. No correspondence between Haug and Segovia is known to exist since they communicated mostly by telephone.

Hans Haug became acquainted with other guitarists such as Luise Walker at the Geneva Competition in 1956. As a result of this meeting, he wrote his Fantasia for Guitar and Piano (1957), which he dedicated to her. In 1963, his Capriccio for flute and guitar was written for the duo Werner Tripp and Konrad Ragossnig (released on RCA Victor 440.182). Also, Haug composed a Concerto for flute, guitar and orchestra in 1966, and he used the guitar in some other works.

== Selected works ==
- Preludio, Tiento et Toccata for solo guitar
- Fantasia pour guitare et piano
- Capriccio pour flûte et guitare (1963)
- Fantasia Concertante for viola and orchestra (1965)
