= The Corn Grows Ripe =

1956 children's book

- Author: Dorothy Rhoads
- Language: English
- Genre: Children's literature
- Publisher: Follett
- Publication date: 1956
- Publication place: United States

The Corn Grows Ripe is a 1956 children's novel written by Dorothy Rhoads. The story follows a lazy 12-year-old Mayan boy, Dionisio, living in the Yucatán, who must assume his father's farming duties after his father breaks his leg in an accident. It was a Newbery Honor book in 1957.
