= USS Leyte (CV-32) =

Essex-class aircraft carrier of the US Navy

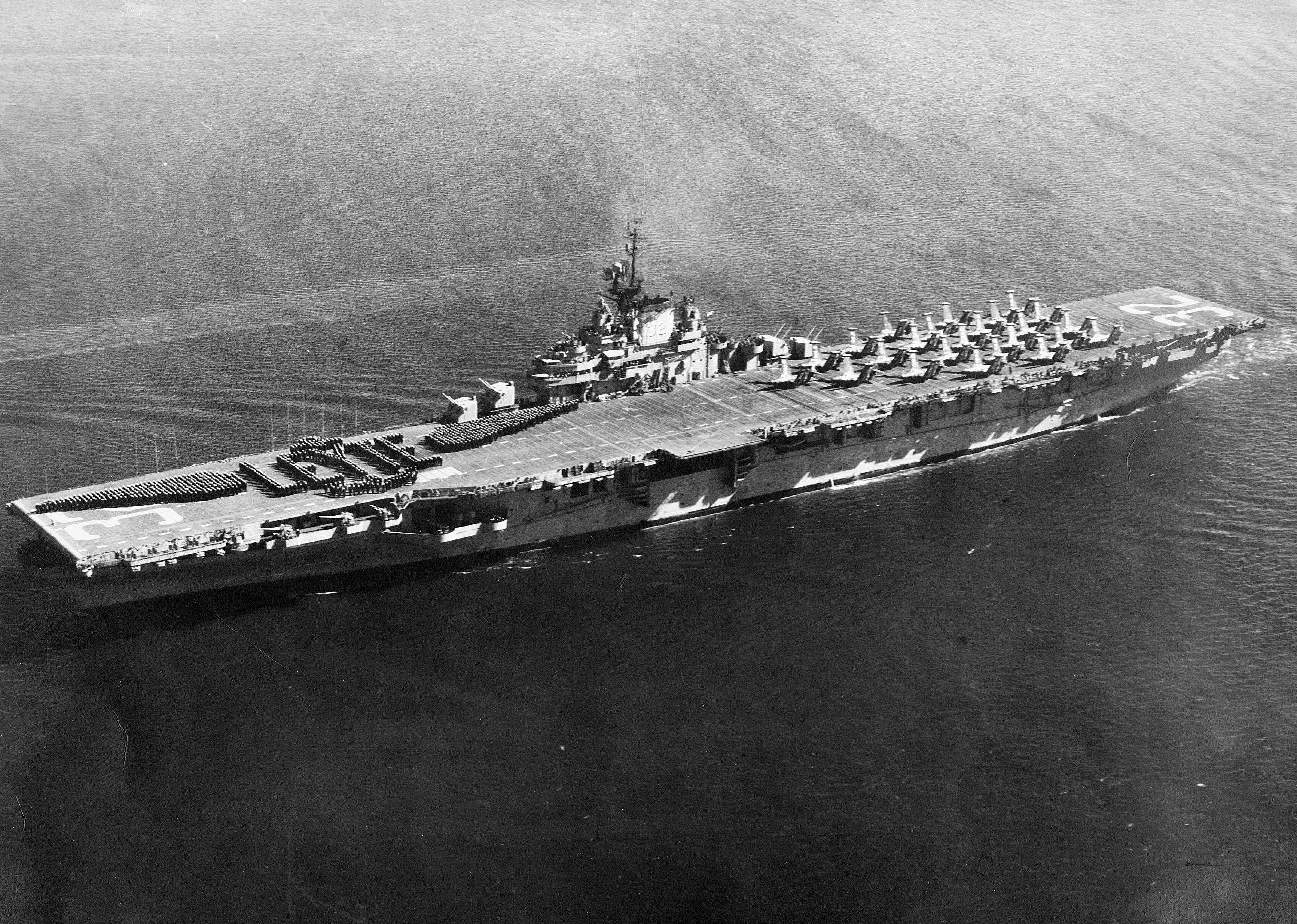
- USS Leyte between 1950 and 1952

History

United States
- Name: Leyte
- Namesake: Battle of Leyte Gulf
- Builder: Newport News Shipbuilding
- Laid down: 21 February 1944
- Launched: 23 August 1945
- Commissioned: 11 April 1946
- Decommissioned: 15 May 1959
- Renamed: from Crown Point, 8 May 1945
- Reclassified: CVA-32, 1 October 1952; CVS-32, 8 August 1953; AVT-10, 15 May 1959
- Fate: Scrapped, September 1970

General characteristics
- Class & type: Essex-class aircraft carrier
- Displacement: 27,100 long tons (27,500 t) standard
- Length: 888 feet (271 m) overall
- Beam: 93 feet (28 m)
- Draft: 28 feet 7 inches (8.71 m)
- Installed power: 8 × boilers; 150,000 shp (110 MW)
- Propulsion: 4 × geared steam turbines; 4 × shafts
- Speed: 33 knots (61 km/h; 38 mph)
- Complement: 3448 officers and enlisted
- Armament: 12 × 5 inch (127 mm)/38 caliber guns; 32 × Bofors 40 mm guns; 46 × Oerlikon 20 mm cannons
- Armor: Belt: 4 in (102 mm); Hangar deck: 2.5 in (64 mm); Deck: 1.5 in (38 mm); Conning tower: 1.5 inch
- Aircraft carried: 90–100 aircraft

USS Leyte (CV/CVA/CVS-32, AVT-10) was one of 24 Essex-class aircraft carriers built during and shortly after World War II for the United States Navy. The ship was the third US Navy ship to bear the name, but the first one named after the Battle of Leyte Gulf. Leyte was commissioned in April 1946, too late to serve in World War II. She spent most of her career in the Atlantic, Caribbean, and Mediterranean, but also saw service in the Korean War, in which she earned two battle stars. She was reclassified in the early 1950s as an attack carrier (CVA), then as an Antisubmarine Aircraft Carrier (CVS), and finally (after inactivation) as an aircraft transport (AVT).

Unlike most of her sister ships, Leyte received no major modernizations, and thus throughout her career retained the classic appearance of a World War II Essex-class ship. She was decommissioned in 1959 and sold for scrap in 1970.

== Construction and commissioning ==
Leyte was one of the "long-hull" Essex-class ships. She was laid down as Crown Point on 21 February 1944 at the Newport News Shipbuilding & Dry Dock Co., Newport News, Virginia, and renamed Leyte on 8 May 1945 to commemorate the recent Battle of Leyte Gulf. She was launched on 23 August, sponsored by Alice Dillon Mead, wife of U.S. Senator James M. Mead, and commissioned on 11 April 1946, with Captain Henry F. MacComsey in command.

== Service history ==
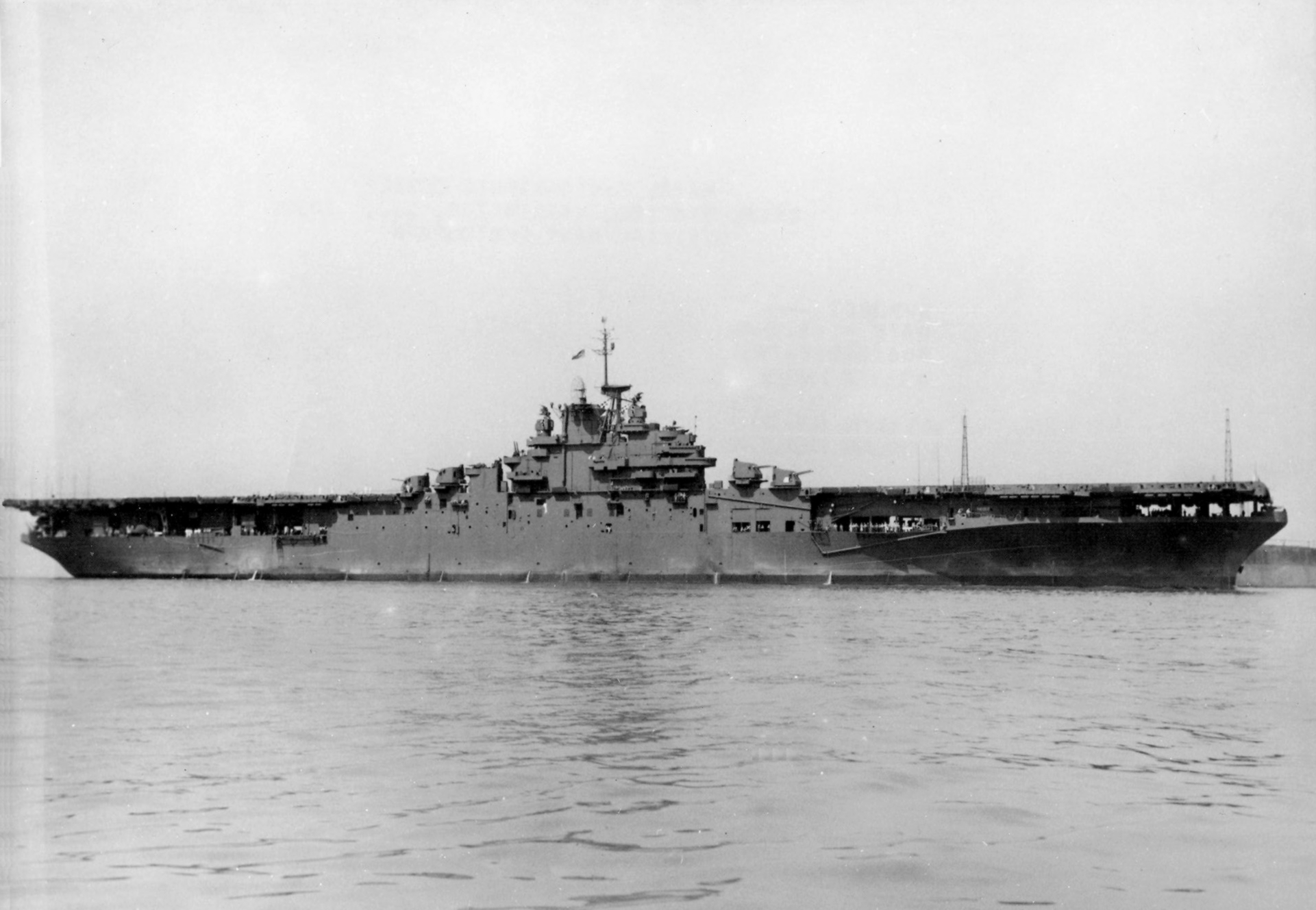
Leyte in 1946

Leyte joined battleship Wisconsin on a good will cruise along the western seaboard of South America in the fall of 1946 before returning to the Caribbean on 18 November to resume shakedown operations. In 1948, the carrier was equipped with its first helicopter detachment of HO3S-1 utility helicopters, and participated in a fleet exercise, Operation Frigid, in the North Atlantic.

In the years preceding the Korean War, the Leyte participated in numerous other fleet exercises in the Atlantic and Caribbean, trained naval reservists, and deployed four times to the Mediterranean: April–June 1947, July–November 1947, September 1949 – January 1950, and May–August 1950.

Beginning in September 1948, while in Guantanamo Bay, Leyte hosted a number of Air Force pilots for a month, cross-training for carrier-based operations. Notable pilots participating in those exercises included Kenneth O. Chilstrom and George I. Ruddell.

The deployment of Leyte to the Mediterranean in mid-1950 included a demonstration of airpower over Beirut, Lebanon, on 14 August, supporting the Middle East against communist pressure. Leyte returned to Norfolk on 24 August, and after two weeks of preparation, departed on 6 September to join Task Force 77 (TF 77) in the Far East to support United Nations Forces in Korea.

Leyte arrived at the Sasebo base for U.S. Fleet Activities in Sasebo, Japan, on 8 October 1950 and made final preparations for combat operations. From 9 October – 19 January 1951, the ship and her aircraft spent 92 days at sea and flew 3,933 sorties against North Korean forces. Her pilots accumulated 11,000 hours in the air while inflicting massive damage upon enemy positions, supplies, transportation, and communications. Among the squadrons based on Leyte were the VF-32 Swordsmen, flying the F4U Corsair.

Leyte returned to Norfolk for overhaul on 25 February 1951. After fleet training exercises in the Caribbean terminated on 21 August, the carrier departed for her fifth tour of duty with the United States Sixth Fleet on 3 September. She returned to Norfolk on 21 December for operations out of Hampton Roads, and again steamed for the Mediterranean on 29 August 1952. Reclassified CVA-32 on 1 October, she returned to Boston on 16 February 1953 for deactivation. On 8 August, however, she was ordered to be retained in the active fleet, and, redesignated CVS-32 on the same day, work was begun converting her to an ASW carrier.

Conversion completed on 4 January 1954, Leyte departed Boston for Quonset Point, Rhode Island, as flagship of Carrier Division 18 (CarDiv 18). She remained there for the next five years conducting ASW tactical operations along the eastern seaboard and in the Caribbean.

Leyte departed Quonset Point in January 1959 for the New York Navy Yard where she commenced preinactivation overhaul. She was redesignated AVT-10 and decommissioned both on 15 May 1959, and was assigned to the Philadelphia group of the Atlantic Reserve Fleet, where she remained until sold for scrap in September 1970 and completed in Chesapeake, Virginia.

=== Incidents ===
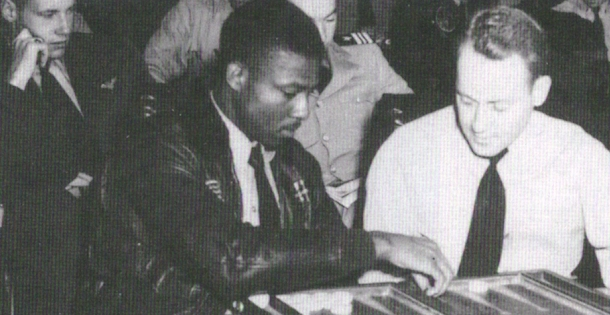
Brown in the ready room of Leyte

On 4 December 1950, the first African-American to complete the Navy's basic flight training program, Ensign Jesse L. Brown, who was assigned to Fighter Squadron 32 (VF-32) aboard Leyte, was killed in action while supporting ground troops at the Battle of Chosin Reservoir. Brown's wingman, Thomas J. Hudner Jr., was awarded the Medal of Honor for attempting to save Brown's life.

At 15:15 on 16 October 1953, while at the South Boston Naval Annex and still under conversion to an antisubmarine carrier, Leyte suffered an explosion in her port catapult machinery room. Within minutes, naval base and city fire trucks were on the scene. After a hard and gallant fight, the fire was extinguished at 19:57. As a result of the fire, 37 men (including five civilians) died and 28 were injured. It remains the largest loss of life on the Boston waterfront.

On 26 February 1955, Hans Anton Michelberger, a fireman apprentice from Old Bridge, New Jersey, was swept overboard and lost at sea; his body was not recovered.

== Awards ==

Navy Unit Commendation
World War II Victory Medal	Navy Occupation Service Medal (with Europe clasp)	National Defense Service Medal
Korean Service Medal (with 2 battle stars)	United Nations Korean Medal	Republic of Korea War Service Medal (retroactive)

== Memorials ==
The builder's plaque from Leyte is in the collection of the Naval History and Heritage Command.

A historical marker honoring Leyte is located in Charlestown, Boston, near the USS Constitution. The inscription reads, in part: "In memory of our shipmates and civilians lost in the disastrous explosion aboard the USS Leyte on October 16, 1953 while in the Boston Naval Shipyard."

== Gallery ==
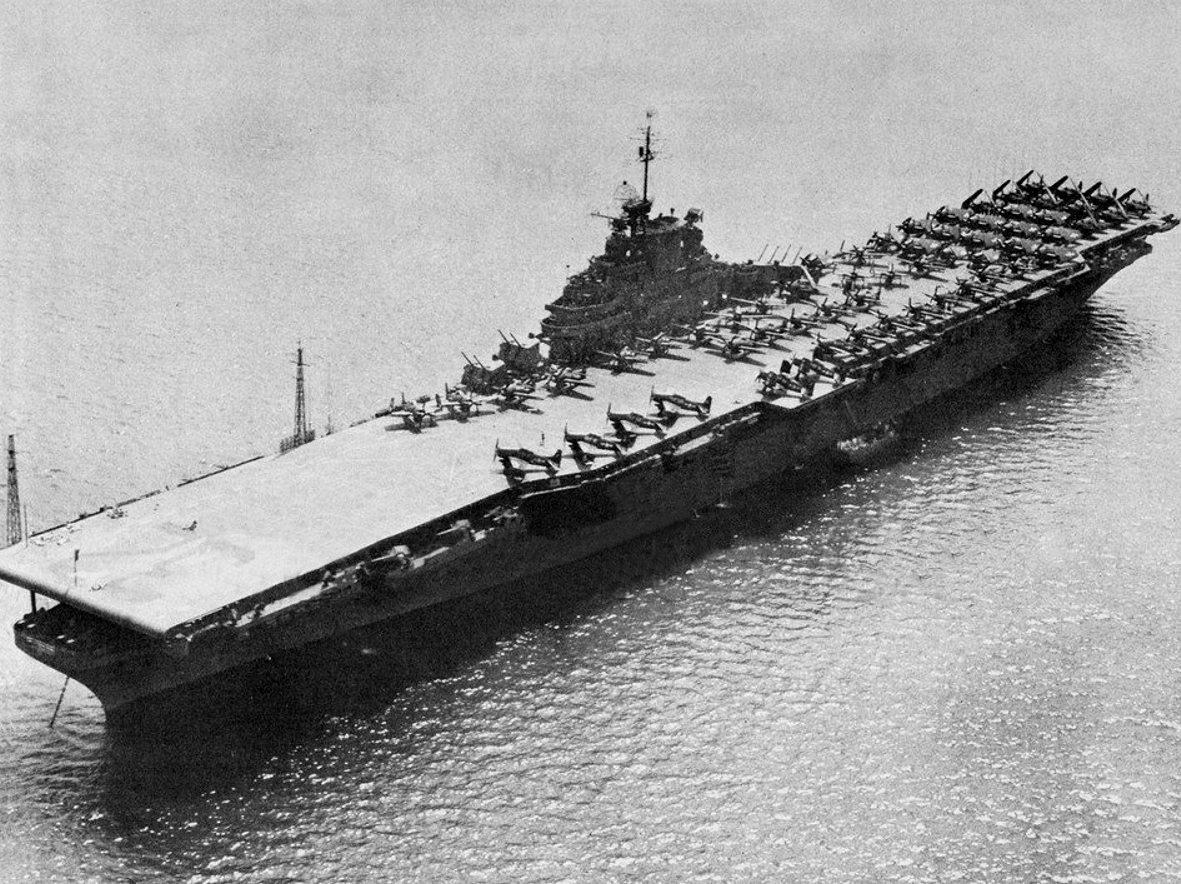
Leyte anchored in Guantanamo Bay in 1946

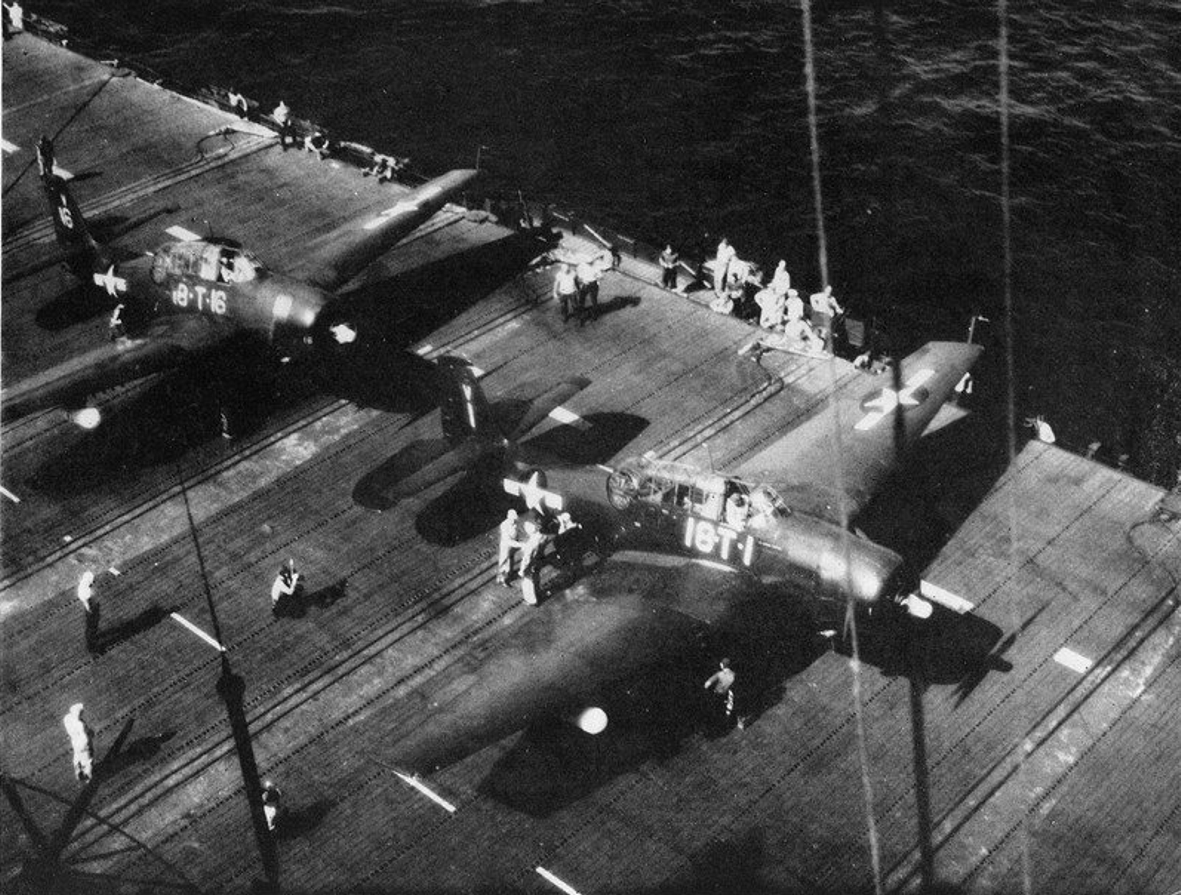
TBM-3E Avengers onboard Leyte in 1946

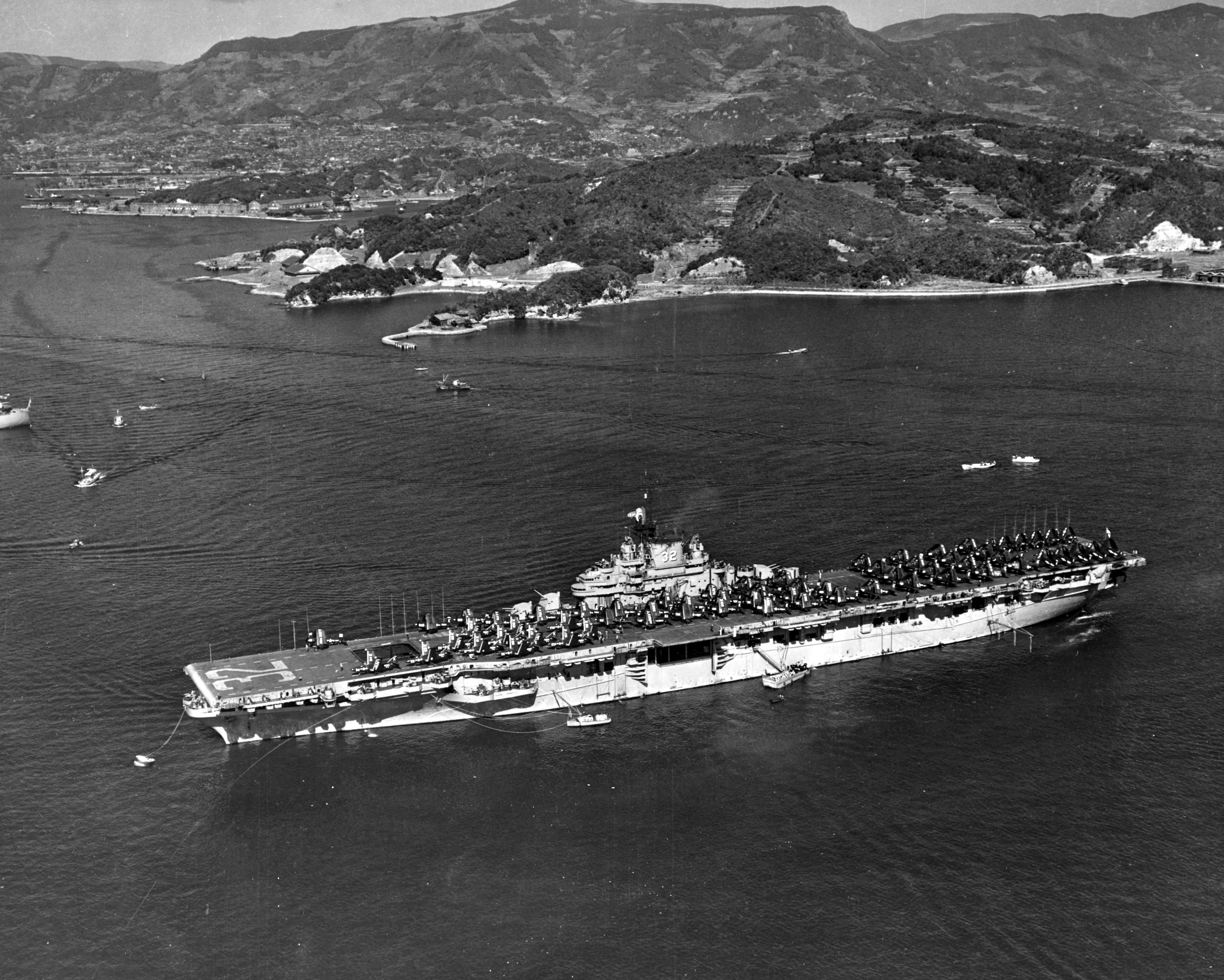
Leyte off Sasebo in December 1950

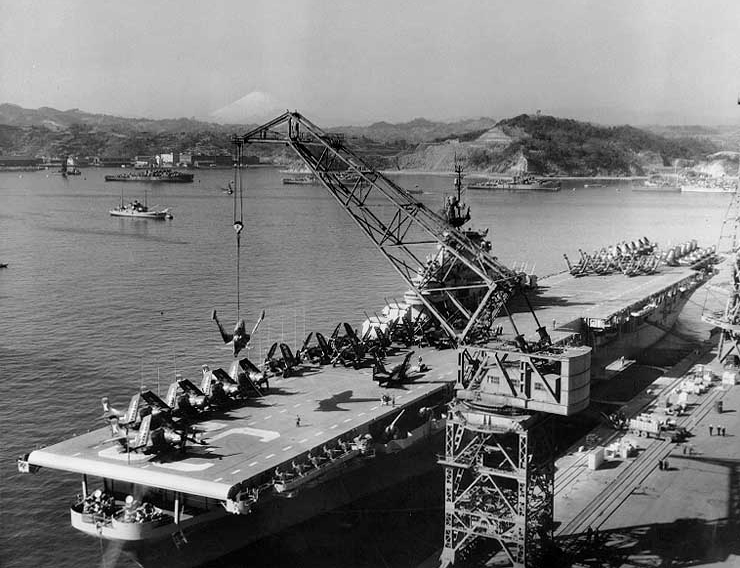
Leyte in Yokosuka in January 1951

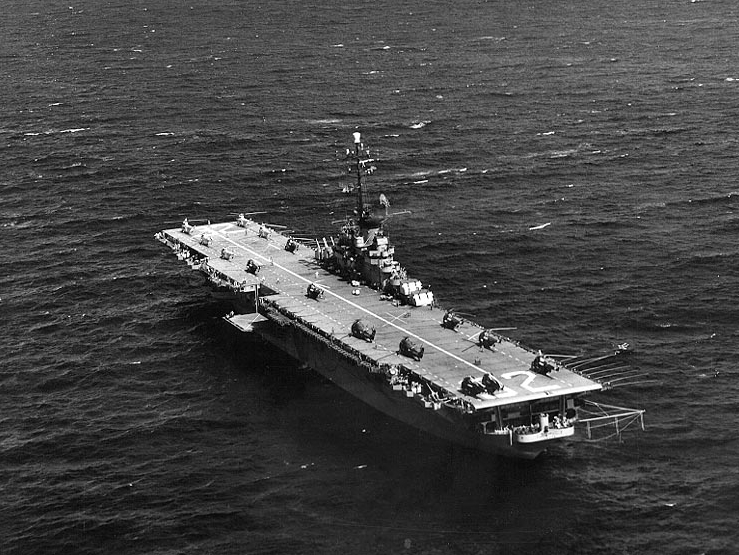
Leyte off Vieques Island with Sikorsky HUS-1 and Sikorsky HRS in 1957

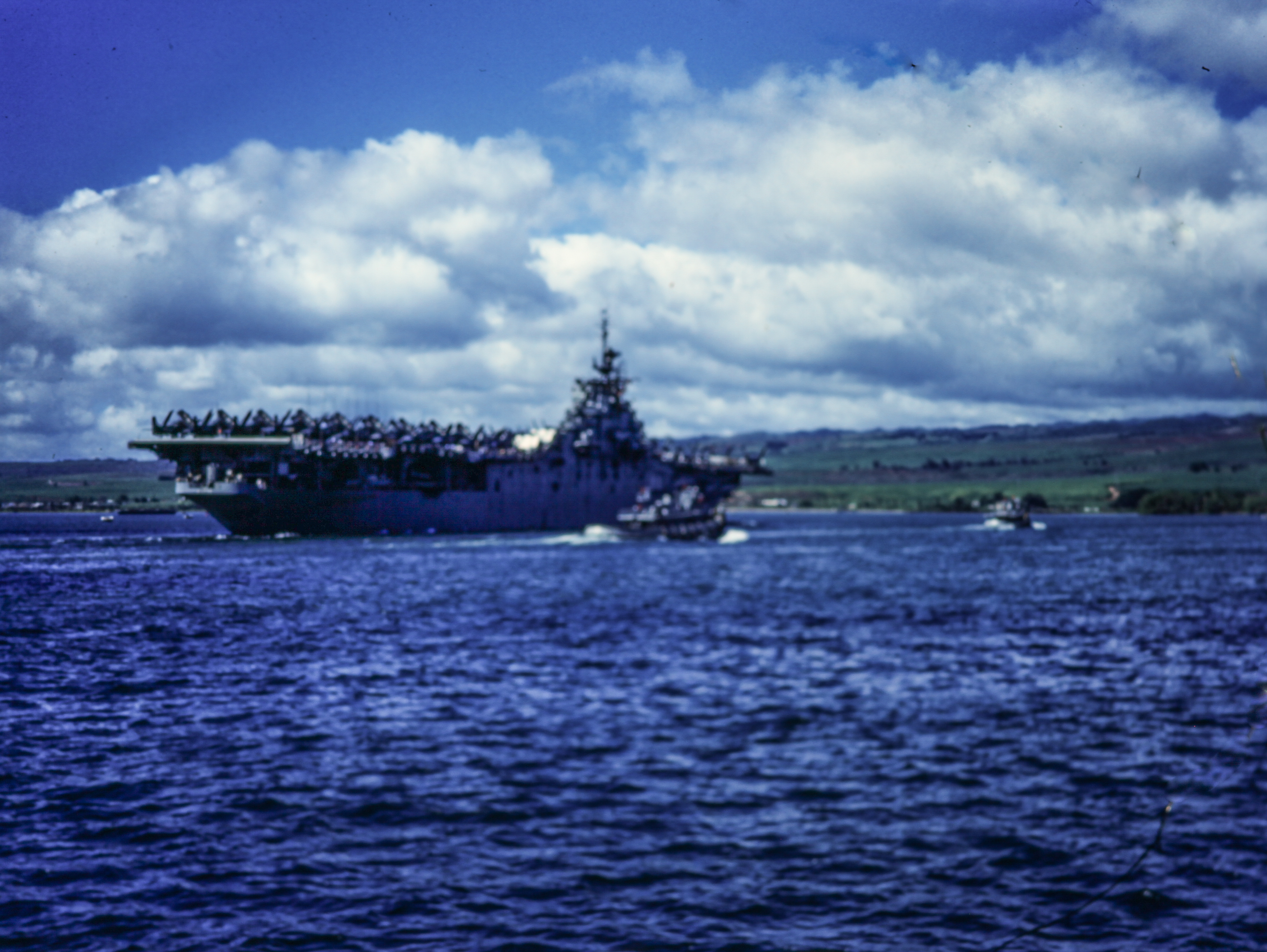
Leyte in Yokosuka in 1950–51

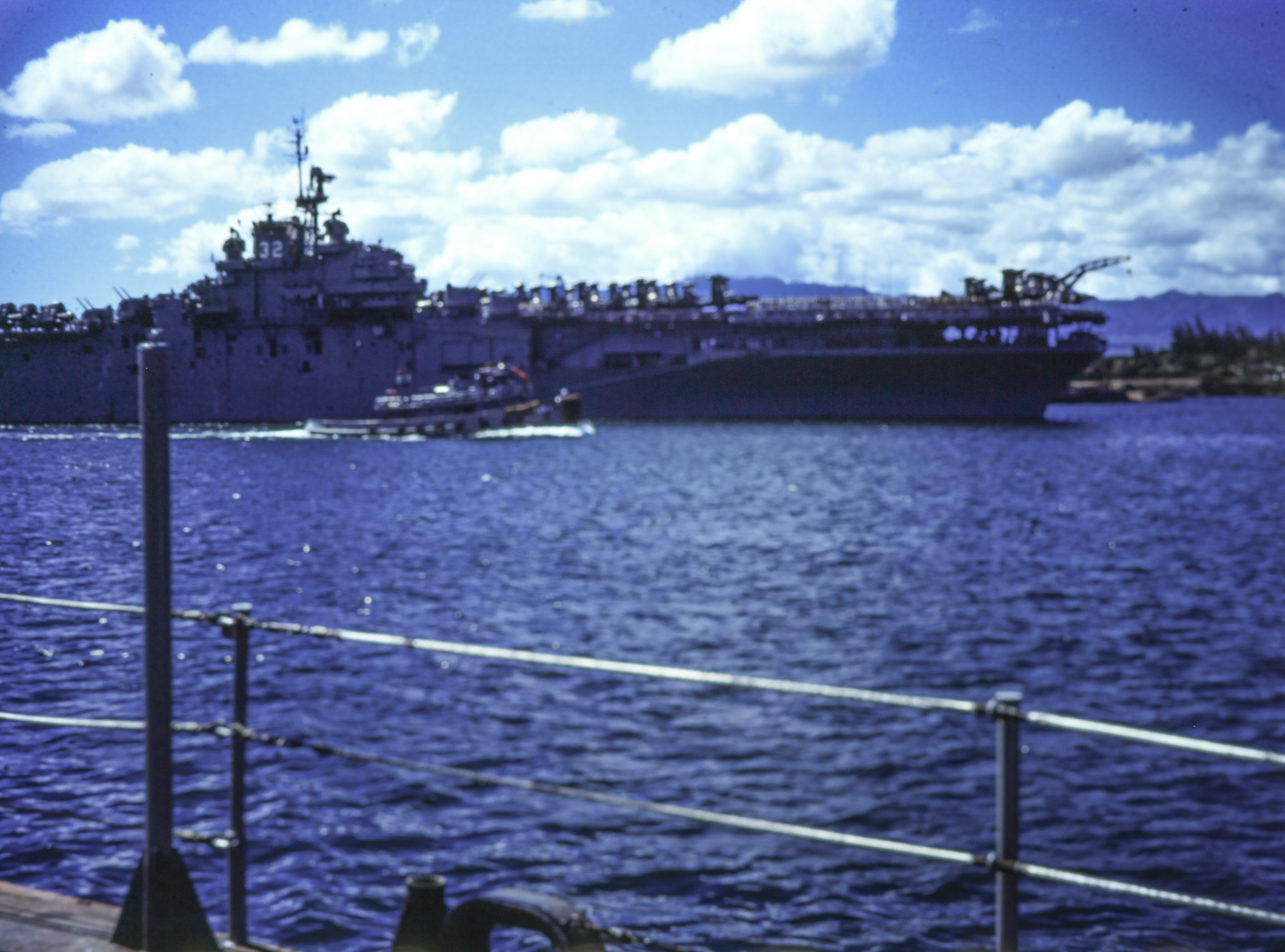
Leyte in Yokosuka, taken from USS Toledo

== See also ==
- List of disasters in Massachusetts by death toll
