= Albert Moeschinger =

Swiss composer

Albert Moeschinger (10 January 1897 – 25 September 1985) was a Swiss composer.

== Life ==
Born in Basel, Moeschinger, son of a merchant, completed his musical studies in Bern, Leipzig (composition with Paul Graener, piano with Robert Teichmüller) and Munich (composition with Walter Courvoisier). After several seasons as an ensemble pianist in café houses, Moeschinger settled in Bern, where he taught privately as a piano and theory teacher, and from 1937 also at the University of the Arts Bern, and resumed his compositional activities.

In 1943, health problems led him to settle in the Valais mountain village of Saas Fee. From this time on, he devoted himself exclusively to composition. Reading Thomas Mann's musical novel Dr. Faustus and the subsequent correspondence with the writer in 1948 encouraged him to integrate the twelve-tone technique into his work. After 1956, Moeschinger lived mainly in Ascona. He spent the rest of his life in Thun, where he died on 25 September 1985 at the age of 88.

Moeschinger's oeuvre, which includes all genres except opera, comprises over 400 titles. He received the following awards: in 1952 the Culture Prize of the City of Basel, in 1957 the composition prize of the "Schweizerischer Tonkünstlerverein" and in 1981 the music prize of the Canton of Bern. His estate is housed in the Basel University Library.

Traces of Moeschinger's church music can be found in the hymnal of the Protestant Reformed Churches of Switzerland: Gesangbuch der Evangelisch-reformierten Kirchen der deutschsprachigen Schweiz 215 Herr wir warten arm und hungrig (same melody also 318, 553 and 717) and 256 Es ist ein Wort ergangen.

== Compositions ==
- Vocal work:
  - Der Herbst des Einsamen (ein Gedenkmal for Georg Trakl) für Frauenchor a cappella
  - Miracles de l'enfance for mezzo-soprano and small orchestra
  - Dialogue for tenor, baritone and orchestra
  - Le Chansonnier pour Mariette for voice and piano
- Pieces for piano:
  - 9 kleine Klavierstücke
  - D'un cahier valaisan
  - 3 Toccatas
- Chamber music:
  - Klaviertrio
  - Quintett über Schweizerische Volkslieder for flute, oboe, clarinet, horn and bassoon
  - Quatuor anthérin for saxophone quartet
  - Consort for strings
  - Introduzione e scherzo for 2 violins and viola (1933)
  - Portrait of Emmy, Trio for 2 violins and viola (1967)
- Concertante pieces:
  - 5 Klavierkonzerte
  - Violinkonzert
  - Trompetenkonzert
  - Concert pour une ballerine, saxophone et orchestre
- Orchestral work:
  - 5 symphonies
  - Extra muros for woodwinds and brass, harp, piano, celesta, vibraphone and percussion
  - Fantasia 1944, for string orchestra
  - Erratique for large orchestra
  - On ne traverse pas la nuit for large orchestra
