= Walter Courvoisier =

Swiss composer and music educator

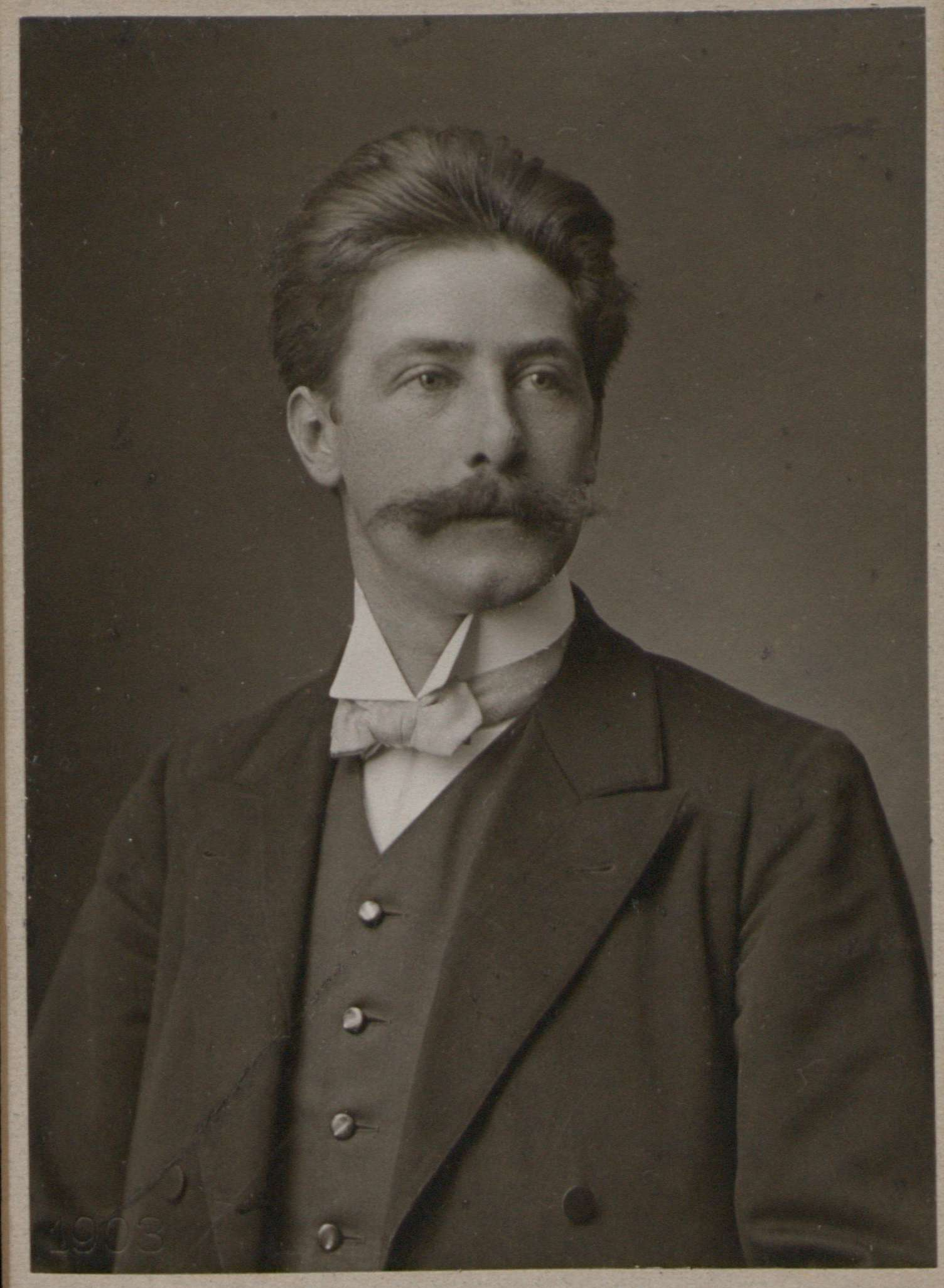
Walter Courvoisier

Walter Courvoisier (7 February 1875 – 27 December 1931) was a Swiss composer.

== Life ==
Born in Riehen, Courvoisier was a son of the surgeon Ludwig Georg Courvoisier. He initially studied medicine and worked as a doctor after obtaining his doctorate. In 1902 he went to Munich to study music. He was a student of Selmar Bagge and Ludwig Thuille - whose son-in-law he became - and then taught at the Hochschule für Musik und Theater München, first music theory, and later music composition.

Courvoisier died in Locarno at the age of 66.

== Compositions ==
=== Operas ===
- Lanzelot und Elaine, musical drama in four acts; libretto: Berta Thiersch, pseudonym "Walter Bergh" (1910–12, first performance Munich 1917)
- Die Krähen (The Crows), comedy in one act; libretto: Alois Wohlmuth (1919/20, first performance Munich 1920)
- Der Sünde Zauberei (The Sin of Magic), opera in one prelude and two scenes; libretto: Joseph von Eichendorff after Pedro Calderón de la Barca (1929, unperformed) online

=== Vocal works ===
- The Muse, for baritone and orchestra op. 4; after Heinrich Leuthold (1903)
- Gruppe aus dem Tartarus, ballad for mixed choir and orchestra Op. 5; after Friedrich Schiller (1904)
- Der Dinurstrom, ballad for mixed choir and orchestra op. 11; after Wilhelm Hertz (1906)
- Das Schlachtschiff Téméraire (1796), Ballad for male chorus and orchestra Op. 12; after Detlev von Liliencron (1906)
- Auferstehung (former title: Totenfeier), Cantata for four soloists, mixed choir and orchestra op. 26; after words of the Bible, arranged by Alfred Bertholet (1915)
- Three Choirs a cappella Op. 33; after Joseph von Eichendorff (1931)
- Five Songs for mixed choir a cappella Op. 34 (1931)

=== Lieder with piano accompaniment ===
- Sechs Lieder für tiefe Stimme op. 1 (1903)
- Sieben Lieder op. 2 (1903)
- Acht Gedichte von Anna Ritter op. 3 (1903)
- Sechs Lieder op. 6 (1904)
- Fünf Lieder für tiefe Stimme op. 7 (1904)
- Sieben Gedichte von Peter Cornelius op. 8 (1905)
- Sechs Gedichte von Theodor Storm op. 9 (1905)
- Zwei Gedichte von Theodor Storm, Vier Gedichte von Klaus Groth op. 13 (1906)
- Fünf Gedichte von Wilhelm Hertz op. 14 (1903/04)
- Drei Gedichte von Emanuel Geibel op. 15 (1906)
- Fünf Gedichte von Friedrich Hebbel op. 16 (1907/08)
- Fünf Gedichte von Peter Cornelius op. 17 (1908)
- Zwei Sonette von Michelangelo und altitalienisches Sonett op. 18 (1906/08)
- Sieben Gedichte von Emanuel Geibel op. 19 (1906/08)
- Sieben alte deutsche Gedichte op. 23 (1909/10)
- Gedichte von Hermann Hesse op. 24 (1917, then 1929)
- Geistliche Lieder in fünf Bänden op. 27 (1917–1919)
- Kleine Lieder zu Kinderreimen in four volumes op. 28 (1916–1919)
- Lieder auf alte Deutsche Gedichte op. 29 (1912/14, 1920–1925)

=== Instrumental works ===
Sonatina for piano Op.

- Piano Trio Op. (1902)
- Symphonic Prologue to Carl Spitteler's Olympic Spring for Orchestra Op. 10 (1905)
- Passacaglia and Fugue in B flat minor for piano op. 20 (1908/09)
- Variations and Fugue on a separate theme in E flat major for piano Op. 21 (1909)
- Variations on an own theme D major for piano Op. 22 (1909)
- Festival Overture for Orchestra (1920s)
- Six Suites for violin solo Op. 31 (1921/22)
- Slow movement for string quartet Op. (1921/22)

== Students ==
- Dora Pejačević (1885–1923), composer
- Max Butting (1888–1976), composer
- Gerhart von Westerman (1894–1963), composer
- Robert Gerhard (1896–1970), composer
- Paul Ben-Haim (1897–1984), composer, conductor
- Albert Moeschinger (1897–1985)
- Walter Simon Huber (1898–1978), music teacher, organist and choir director
- Willy Burkhard (1900–1955), composer
- Hermann Reutter (1900–1985), composer, pianist
- Franz Rupp (1901–1992), pianist and accompanist
- Hans Haug (1900–1967), composer, conductor, pianist
- Heinrich Sutermeister (1910–1995), composer
