= Kevin Curran (footballer, born 1919) =

Australian rules footballer, born 1919

Personal information
- Full name: Kevin Peter Curran
- Born: 3 October 1919; Ultima, Victoria
- Died: 14 February 1986 (aged 66); Prahran, Victoria
- Original team: Kulwin
- Height: 183 cm (6 ft 0 in)
- Weight: 97 kg (214 lb)

Playing career^{1}
Years	Club	Games (Goals)
1943–45	Richmond	16 (28)
- ^{1} Playing statistics correct to the end of 1945.

Kevin Peter Curran (3 October 1919 – 14 February 1986) was an Australian rules footballer who played with Richmond in the Victorian Football League (VFL).
