= John Gorwell =

Australian rules footballer

Personal information
- Full name: John Gorwell
- Born: 12 February 1935
- Died: 27 February 1986 (aged 51)
- Original team: Colac
- Height: 160 cm (5 ft 3 in)
- Weight: 76 kg (168 lb)

Playing career^{1}
Years	Club	Games (Goals)
1955	Richmond	9 (0)
- ^{1} Playing statistics correct to the end of 1955.

John Gorwell (12 February 1935 – 27 February 1986) was an Australian rules footballer who played with Richmond in the Victorian Football League (VFL).
