= August Schmid-Lindner =

German pianist, composer and music educator

August Schmid-Lindner (15 July 1870 – 21 October 1959) was a German pianist, composer and music educator working in Munich.

== Life ==
Born in Augsburg, Schmid-Lindner was already a "proper organist" as a child of 10 years. As a high school student in Munich he was encouraged to study music by Josef Rheinberger. This pushed him as a teacher at the Munich Academy of Music together with the piano teacher Hans Bussmayer. Schmid-Lindner received final lessons from Franz Liszt's student Sophie Menter. Thus began his career, which brought the first major success in 1889 with the award of the Mendelssohn Prize in Berlin. He became known as a concert pianist, chamber musician and conductor as well as an outstanding music educator.

In 1900, he was offered a professorship at the Hochschule für Musik und Theater München, which he held until 1939. He also became known beyond Munich in numerous concerts through a chamber orchestra under his direction until 1939. He was also one of the founders of the Munich Bach Association. Schmid-Lindner often worked with Max Reger, among others on the edition of piano works by Johann Sebastian Bach (such as: Chromatic Fantasy and Fugue). Schmid-Lindner edited and published numerous scores and sheet music in music publishing houses, especially by Franz Liszt, as well as his own compositions. Schmid-Lindner was also friends with Waldemar Bonsels and Fritz Skorzeny.

In the context of the "Mozart-Woche des Deutschen Reiches", he was entrusted in 1941 with the musical direction of the performance of Così fan tutte in Munich, whose dance performances, under the direction of the choreographer Senta Maria Schmid, were taken over by members of the school of Dorothee Günther, such as Lilo Ramdohr.

In March 1953 Schmid-Lindner was awarded the Order of Merit of the Federal Republic of Germany.

Schmid-Lindner died in Auerberg, (Oberbayern) at the age of 89.

== Publications ==
- Ausgewählte Schriften.
- Das Klavier in Max Regers Kunst.

== Compositions ==
- Ausgewählte Schriften. Schneider Verlag, Tutzing 1973. ISBN 3-795-20121-7
- Das Klavier in Max Regers Kunst. Gaumusikschule Danzig-Westpreußen, Danzig 1942 Das verrückte Tischl – Tanzpantomime nach Mozarts Fragment „Musik zu einer Faschingspantomime“ KV 446 (collaborator: A. Schmid-Lindner 1941) Publisher: Agentur Bärenreiter (Alkor-Edition Kassel)

== Dedicatees ==
Several composers dedicated their works to Schmid-Lindner:

- Max Reger: Variationen und Fuge über ein Thema von Johann Sebastian Bach op. 81 (1904) for piano
- Lilo Martin: Sonate a-moll op. 2 (1935) for piano

== Literature ==
- Ambacher Schriften 7: Waldemar Bonsels und seine Komponistenfreunde Fritz Skorzeny und August Schmid-Lindner. Publisher: Harrassowitz, Wiesbaden 1986. ISBN 3-447-03229-4.
