= Lilo Martin =

German composer

Lilo Martin (31 October 1908 – 9 February 1986) was a German composer.

== Life ==
Born in Munich, Martin studierte piano with Josef Pembaur and conducting with August Schmid-Lindner (1870–1959. Afterwards she was a composition student in the master class of Hans Pfitzner at the Hochschule für Musik und Theater München.

In 1935 she married the pianist and conductor Horand Roemer (1908-1940). In her second marriage, she was from 1943 with the painter Robert du Parc (1889-1979). With him she lived at Rubein Castle near Merano. She died there aged 77.

== Work ==
- Vier Phantasiestücke (op.1; 1934) for piano.
- Sonate a-moll. ...(op.2 1935) for piano (dedicated to August Schmid-Lindner)
- Vier Lieder (op.3 1936) with accompaniment by a small orchestra (dedicated to Hans Pfitzner). Text: ?. UA 19?? Leipzig (Gewandhaus; Tiana Lemnitz [soprano], conductor: Hermann Abendroth)
- Lieder an die Mutter (op.4). Text: Joseph von Eichendorff

1.;Es wandelt, was wir schauen (Eichendorff)

== Literature ==
- Hans Rectanus: Margrit Hügel, Maria Dombrowsky und Lilo Martin – Drei Komponistinnen in Hans Pfitzners Berliner und Münchner Meisterklassen. In Studien zur Musikgeschichte. Festschrift für Ludwig Finscher. Kassel 1995, pp. 750–758
