= Dorothy Rhoads =

American children's author

- Born: March 19, 1895; Illinois, US
- Died: February 21, 1986; Santa Fe, New Mexico, US
- Resting place: Rock Island, Illinois, US
- Occupation: Author
- Writing career
- Genre: Children's literature

Dorothy Rhoads (March 19, 1895 – February 21, 1986) was an American writer of children's literature. Her book The Corn Grows Ripe was a Newbery Honor recipient in 1953.

== Biography ==
Dorothy M. Rhoads was born in Illinois, March 19, 1895. She was the daughter of Franklin Koons and Frances May Cook Rhoads. She attended Wellesley College. Circa 1920, she and her younger sister, Frances, moved to Santa Fe, New Mexico; she would live there for the remainder of her life.

Dorothy and Frances maintained a voluminous correspondence, and spent time together in Mexico. Dorothy's family had a Maya godchild, Dorita, who would appear as a character in Dorothy's writing.

Rhoads wrote throughout her life, including diaries, short stories, and poetry. Her only novel, The Corn Grows Ripe, was published in 1956. Kirkus Reviews, noting the book's Yucatán setting, opined that the novel "traces the influence of old legends in the present day." It was named a Newbery Honor book in 1957.

Rhoads died in 1986, at the age of 90. Her papers are held by the Brigham Young University Library and the University of Minnesota Library.
