= Wei Pei-lan =

Chinese politician

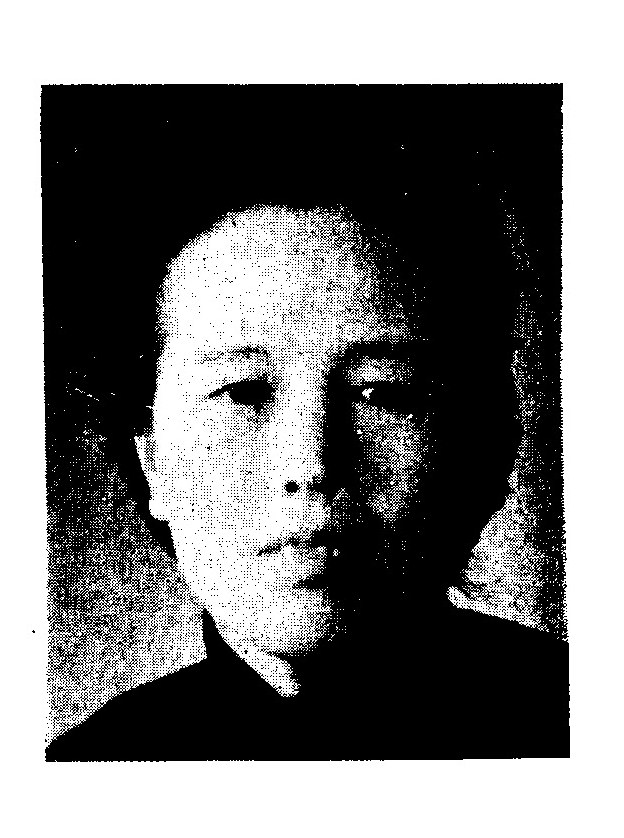

Member of the Legislative Yuan
- In office 1948–1986
- Constituency: Gansu

Personal details
- Born: 24 August 1911
- Died: 22 February 1986 (aged 74)

Wei Pei-lan (Chinese: 魏佩蘭, 24 August 1911 – 22 February 1986) was a Chinese educator and politician. She was among the first group of women elected to the Legislative Yuan in 1948.

== Biography ==
Originally from Gangu County in Gansu province, Wei studied at Peking Normal University. She worked as a teacher and director of discipline at Lanzhou Girls' Normal School, before becoming headmistress of Gansu Pingliang Girls' Normal School.

She joined the Kuomintang and became a member of the executive committee of the Gansu provincial party, as well as chairing its women's committee. She was appointed to the Gansu Provincial Senate and was a Kuomintang candidate in the 1948 elections for the Legislative Yuan, in which she was elected to parliament. She relocated to Taiwan during the Chinese Civil War, where she remained a member of the Legislative Yuan until her death in 1986.
