= Len Catton =

Australian rules footballer, born 1914

Personal information
- Full name: Leonard William Catton
- Born: 5 January 1914; Swan Hill, Victoria
- Died: 5 February 1986 (aged 72); Swan Hill, Victoria
- Original team: Woorinen
- Height: 187 cm (6 ft 2 in)
- Weight: 78 kg (172 lb)

Playing career^{1}
Years	Club	Games (Goals)
1938	Melbourne	2 (0)
1938–39	Fitzroy	4 (0)
Total		6 (0)
- ^{1} Playing statistics correct to the end of 1939.

Leonard William Catton (5 January 1914 – 5 February 1986) was an Australian rules footballer who played with Melbourne and Fitzroy in the Victorian Football League (VFL).
