= George I. Ruddell =

George Inkerman Ruddell
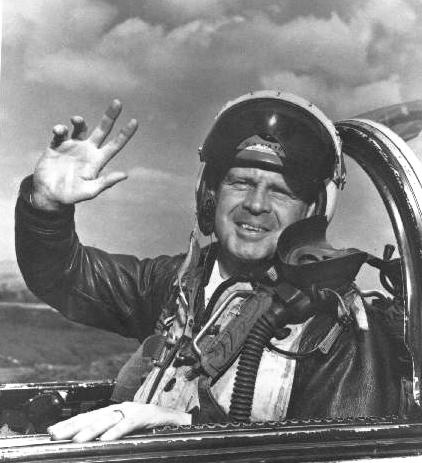
- Born: 21 January 1919; Winnipeg, Manitoba, Canada
- Died: 27 February 2015 (aged 96); The Dalles, Oregon
- Military career
- Allegiance: United States of America
- Branch: United States Army Air Forces; United States Air Force
- Service years: 1941-1970
- Rank: Colonel
- Commands: 39th Fighter-Interceptor Squadron; 479th Tactical Fighter Wing; 33rd Tactical Fighter Wing
- Conflicts: World War II; Korean War; Vietnam War
- Awards: Silver Star (2); Distinguished Flying Cross (6); Soldier's Medal

Colonel George Inkerman Ruddell (21 January 1919 – 27 February 2015) was a United States Air Force officer who served in World War II, the Korean War where he achieved Flying ace status and in the Vietnam War.

== Military career ==
He joined the United States Army Air Force in 1941 and during World War II he served in the 514th Fighter-Bomber Squadron and shot down one enemy aircraft.

In 1948, he was part of an exchange program with the United States Navy on the USS Leyte and flew the F8F Bearcat making 45 carrier landings.

During the Korean War he commanded the 39th Fighter-Interceptor Squadron based at Suwon Air Base. His usual F-86 Sabre was marked as “Mig Mad Mavis”. In late 1952 Ruddell allowed United States Marine Corps aviator John F. Bolt to join the 39th as an exchange pilot, Bolt became the only Marine Corps ace of the war. On 18 May 1953 he became an ace shooting down his fifth MiG-15. He shot down a total of eight MiG-15s during the war.

He commanded the 4th Fighter Wing from 4 May 1955 to 22 August 1956.

He commanded the 479th Tactical Fighter Wing from 1 August 1959 to 19 June 1961.

In 1963 during the early stages of the Vietnam War he served as deputy to the Military Assistance Command Vietnam J-3 (Operations) advising on the expansion of the Republic of Vietnam Air Force.

He commanded the 33rd Tactical Fighter Wing from 1 October 1965 to 29 August 1966.

== Later life ==
Ruddell died on 27 February 2015.
