= Sarah Isabella McElligott =

New Zealand cook and fruit-stall holder

Sarah Isabella McElligott (28 November 1883 – 8 February 1986) was a New Zealand cook and fruit-stall holder. She was born in Kawarau Gorge, Central Otago, New Zealand on 28 November 1883.
