= Alice Lent Covert =

- Born: Alice Lent; April 8, 1913; Winfield, Kansas, U.S.
- Died: February 12, 1986 (aged 72); Riverside, California, U.S.
- Education: Panfield A&M College
- Known for: Novels focused on life in early Oklahoma

Alice Lent Covert (April 8, 1913 – February 12, 1986) was an American novelist and writer known for her novels on life in Oklahoma.

== Biography ==
Alice Lent was born on April 8, 1913, in Winfield, Kansas, to Thomas H. Lent and Neva Parry. Her father was a Methodist minister and the family moved frequently during her childhood. They settled in the Oklahoma Panhandle in 1926 and she attended school in Boise City and Forgan. Lent was first published in the Wichita Beacon at age 16 and worked part time for a newspaper while in high school. While studying journalism and psychology at Panhandle A&M College, she married Fred Covert on June 27, 1930. They had one son, Dale Lowell Covert.

In 1934, her family moved to Lawton where she worked as a journalist and founded the Lawton Writers' Club. Her first novel, Return to Dust, was published in 1939 and focused on an Oklahoma Panhandle family during the Dust Bowl. Her second novel, The Months of Rain. was published in 1941 and focused on farmers after World War II in the Kiamichi Mountains. Her fourth novel, End of Reckoning, was published in 1942 and was reviewed by The New York Times. She also wrote detective stories and for magazines. She later married Donald I. Watson on August 13, 1959. She died on February 12, 1986, in Riverside, California.
