= Alfred Bertholet =

Swiss educator and writer (1868–1951)

Alfred Bertholet (1868–1951) was a Swiss educator and writer. He was educated in Basel, Strasbourg, and Berlin, and taught in Tübingen and Göttingen before returning to Berlin, where he remained from 1928 until 1939. After World War II he returned to Basel, where he stayed for the rest of his career.

== Selected publications ==
- A History of Hebrew Civilization
- Buddhismus und Christentum (1902)
- The Transmigration of Souls (1909)
