= Cecil Bryce =

Australian cricketer

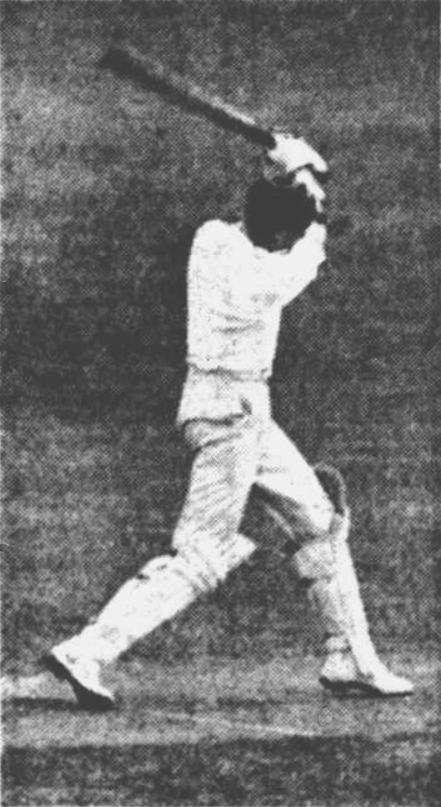

Personal information
- Born: 18 August 1911; Maryborough, Queensland, Australia
- Died: 8 February 1986 (aged 74); Brisbane, Queensland, Australia
- Source: Cricinfo, 1 October 2020

Cecil Bryce (18 August 1911 – 8 February 1986) was an Australian cricketer. He played in one first-class match for Queensland in 1939/40. He also played for South Brisbane District Cricket Club.

== See also ==
- List of Queensland first-class cricketers
