= Florence Fernet-Martel =

Canadian feminist (1892–1986)

Florence Fernet-Martel (July 25, 1892 – February 5, 1986) was an American-born Canadian educator and feminist living in Quebec.

She was born Florence Fernet in Woonsocket, Rhode Island and was educated at the Jésus-Marie convent there, in Berthierville and at the Académie Saint-Denis in Montreal. She went on to earn a diploma in French literature and a Bachelor of Arts from the Université Laval. She taught English for the Montreal Catholic School Commission and then worked as a secretary and translator for an insurance company.

With Thérèse Casgrain, she fought for women's rights, including the right to vote. She was one of the first people to receive a diploma in the social sciences from the Université de Montréal. She provided shelter for students attending the Université de Montréal for forty years.

Fernet-Martel contributed to Chatelaine, to the magazine Le Canada and to the Quebec magazine "La Réforme. From 1933 to 1939, she was host for the Radio Canada program Fémina. She also published genealogical studies and short histories. In 1940, she served on the investment committee for the Canadian Unemployment Insurance Commission. From 1946 to 1972, she served on the arbitration committee for the Unemployment Insurance Commission of Montreal. From 1961 to 1966, she served on the Quebec censor board for cinema.

She was married to Paul Martel.

In 1975, she was named to the Order of Canada for service to the community. In 1981, she received a Governor General's Award in Commemoration of the Persons Case for advancing gender equality.
