= Guang Qin =

Chinese Buddhist monk (1892–1986)

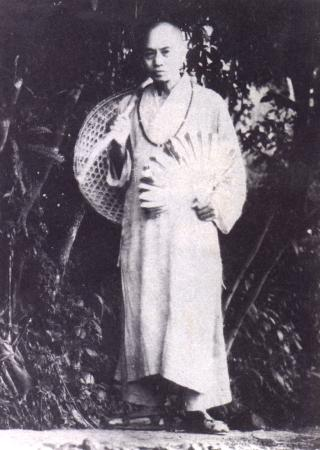
- Master Guang Qin at age 50

Personal life
- Born: 14 December 1892 Huian County, Fukien Province, China
- Died: 13 February 1986 (aged 93) Taiwan

Religious life
- Religion: Buddhism
- School: Ch'an

Guang Qin (廣欽, 14 December 1892 – 13 February 1986) was a renowned Buddhist monk, teacher and cultivator.

Born Huang Wenlai in 1892 in Hui'an County, Fujian, China. Due to his family's extreme poverty, he was sold to the Li family. The Li were not wealthy either and had a fruit growing business that allowed them to barely scrape together a living. His parents died in 1902 when he was only 11 years old. He realised how impermanent human life was and took refuge with Master Rui Fang of the famous Cheng Tian Chan Monastery. In 1927, he took ordination at the same monastery.

From the very beginning, Guang Qin was an ascetic practitioner. In the monastery, one of his duties was to ring the morning wake-up bell. One morning, he accidentally over-slept and missed ringing the bell at the correct time. After that, he never lay down to sleep for the rest of his life and sat up in meditation during his sleep.

In 1985 at the age of 92, on the first day of the Chinese New Year, he called together all of his disciples who were in charge of his different monasteries. He told them that he would pass away soon and that they should divide his relics among Cheng Tian Temple and other temples, monasteries and nunneries. He later went to Miao Tong Temple, the place where he would manifest stillness.

On the fifth day of Chinese New Year, with all his disciples gathered around him he told them to recite Amitabha Buddha's name. He said, "There is no coming and no going, nothing is happening." Then he smiled at his disciples and closed his eyes. He was so still that his disciples checked and discovered that he had died amidst the Amitabha chanting. Guang Qin died at the age of 93 in 1986.

Photos that were taken by an anonymous disciple from Guang Qin's funeral displayed auspicious signs, such as lights pointing down at Guang Qin's casket and supposedly a faint silhouette which appears to look like Amitabha shine down upon the casket. Also, clouds forming a lotus flower was supposedly seen in the sky.

One of Guang Qin's relics is among the relics being toured with the Maitreya Project Heart Relic Tour.
