= Frank Sinclair (Australian footballer) =

Australian rules footballer

Personal information
- Full name: Francis George Sinclair
- Born: 24 August 1916; Carlton, Victoria
- Died: 7 February 1986 (aged 69); Heidelberg West, Victoria
- Height: 165 cm (5 ft 5 in)
- Weight: 66 kg (146 lb)

Playing career^{1}
Years	Club	Games (Goals)
1938–1939	South Melbourne	13 (8)
- ^{1} Playing statistics correct to the end of 1939.

Francis George Sinclair (24 August 1916 – 7 February 1986) was an Australian rules footballer who played with South Melbourne in the Victorian Football League (VFL).
