= Einar Nyheim =

Norwegian industrial worker and politician

- Born: 7 August 1929; Lavik Municipality, Norway
- Died: 20 February 1986 (aged 56)
- Occupations: Industrial worker Politician

Einar Nyheim (7 August 1929 – 20 February 1986) was a Norwegian industrial worker and politician.

He was born in Lavik Municipality to Kåre Nyheim and Ragnhild Haugland. He was elected representative to the Storting for the period 1973–1977 for the Socialist Left Party.
