= Alberto Moreiras (pentathlete) =

Spanish modern pentathlete

Personal information
- Full name: Alberto Moreiras López
- Born: 29 May 1919 Palma de Mallorca, Spain
- Died: 1 February 1986 (aged 66) Madrid, Spain

Sport
- Sport: Modern pentathlon

Alberto Moreiras López (Note: In this Spanish name, the first or paternal surname is Moreiras and the second or maternal family name is López.) (29 May 1919 – 1 February 1986) was a Spanish modern pentathlete. He competed at the 1948 Summer Olympics.
