= Frank Cameron (Australian rules footballer) =

Australian rules footballer (1892–1986)

Personal information
- Full name: Frank Osborne Cameron
- Born: 17 April 1892; Orbost
- Died: 6 February 1986 (aged 93); Shepparton

Playing career^{1}
Years	Club	Games (Goals)
1914	University	8 (0)
- ^{1} Playing statistics correct to the end of 1914.

Frank Osborne Cameron (17 April 1892 – 6 February 1986) was an Australian rules footballer who played with University in the Victorian Football League.

== Sources ==
- Holmesby, Russell & Main, Jim (2007). The Encyclopedia of AFL Footballers. 7th ed. Melbourne: Bas Publishing.
- Frank Cameron's playing statistics from AFL Tables
- Frank Cameron at AustralianFootball.com
