= Matt Wilkins =

Australian rules footballer

Personal information
- Full name: Matthew Alfred Wilkins
- Born: 14 January 1908; Bairnsdale, Victoria
- Died: 5 February 1986 (aged 78); Perth, Western Australia
- Original team: Tatura

Playing career^{1}
Years	Club	Games (Goals)
1929	Hawthorn	2 (0)
- ^{1} Playing statistics correct to the end of 1929.

Matthew Alfred Wilkins (14 January 1908 – 5 February 1986) was an Australian rules footballer who played with Hawthorn in the Victorian Football League (VFL).
