= Marine Aircraft Group 46 =

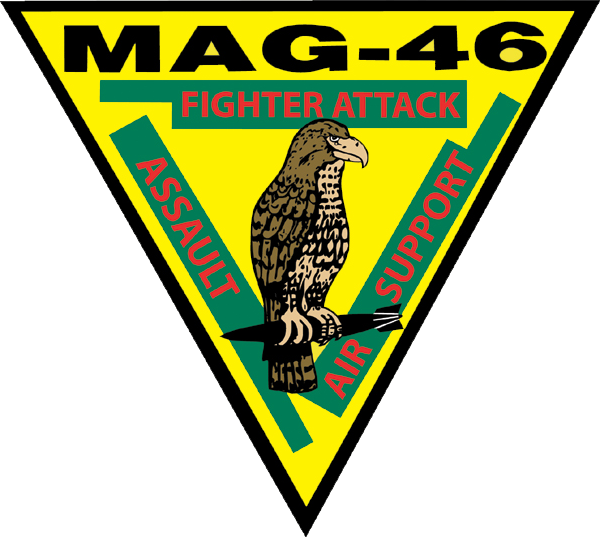
- MAG-46 insignia
- Active: 1 March 1944 - 15 March 1956; 1 July 1962 – 19 June 2009
- Country: United States
- Allegiance: United States of America
- Branch: United States Marine Corps
- Type: Reserve aircraft group
- Role: Close air support Air interdiction Assault support
- Part of: 4th Marine Aircraft Wing; Marine Forces Reserve
- Garrison/HQ: Marine Corps Air Station Miramar
- Engagements: Operation Enduring Freedom; Operation Iraqi Freedom

Marine Aircraft Group 46 (MAG-46) was a United States Marine Corps reserve aviation group based at Marine Corps Air Station Miramar, California with subordinate units spread throughout California. It previously composed of one adversary squadron equipped with the F-5, one CH-46 squadron, one CH-53E squadron, one AH-1W and UH-1N squadron and a maintenance and logistics squadron. MAG-46 fell under the 4th Marine Aircraft Wing and Marine Forces Reserve. Due to a re-organization within Marine aviation, the group was deactivated in 2009.

== Mission ==
Organize, train and equip individual Marines and combat-ready squadrons and to augment and reinforce the active component when required in order to serve as part of our total force.

== History ==
Marine Aircraft Group 46 was activated 1 March 1944 as Marine Base Defense Aircraft Group 46 at Marine Corps Air Station El Toro, California. The Group’s primary mission was to administer and supervise training for combat duty, and other activities of the attached squadrons and detachments. It also trained replacement pilots and crew for Marine squadrons operating in combat areas.

MAG-46 was redesignated on 10 November 1944 as Marine Aircraft Group 46. Another redesignation occurred on 15 May 1945 when it was assigned the title of Marine Air Support Group 46. The termination of hostilities in the summer of 1945 was followed by the rapid demobilization. One result of this policy was the deactivation of the group on 15 March 1946. Six years later, a major reorganization within Marine Aviation began. This reorganization coincided with the formation of 4th Marine Division in the reserve.

Changes included reactivation of MAG 46. Thus on 1 July 1962, Marine Aircraft Group 46 was reactivated at Grosse Ile, Michigan and moved to Naval Air Station New York in Brooklyn on 1 November 1965.

In early 1971, MAG 46 moved back to Marine Corps Air Station El Toro, California and remained there until August 1994 when the Group relocated to its final location at Marine Corps Air Station Miramar, San Diego, California. During the 1990s and 2000s, MAG-46 flying and support units served in the global war on terrorism. MAG-46 squadrons participated in Operation Iraqi Freedom in Iraq and Operation Enduring Freedom in Afghanistan.

On 19 June 2009, the group was deactivated at MCAS Miramar California.

== See also ==
- List of United States Marine Corps aircraft groups
- List of United States Marine Corps aircraft squadrons
