= Auerberg =

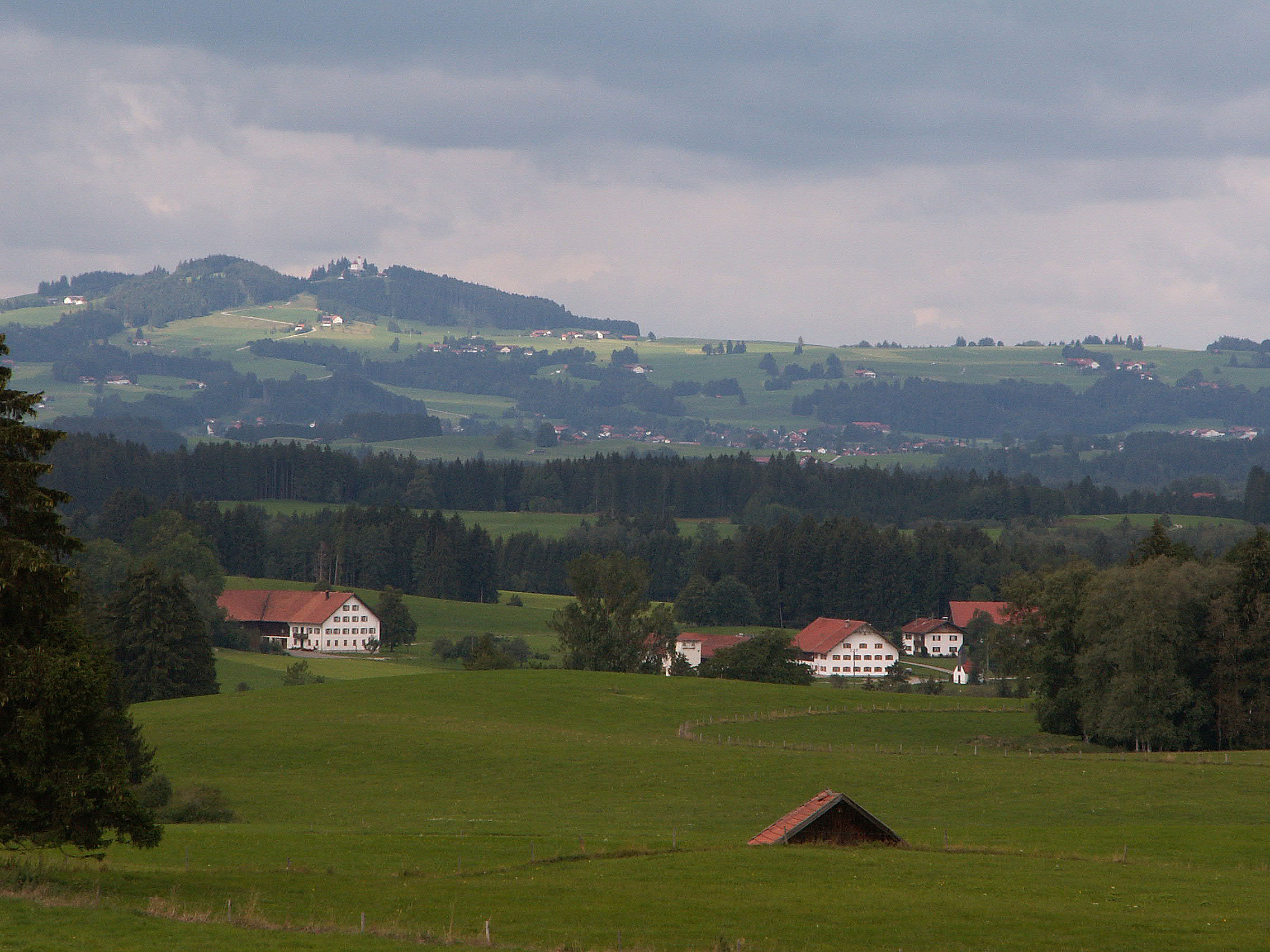
- Auerberg

Highest point
- Elevation: 1,055 m (3,461 ft)
- Coordinates: 47°44′11″N 10°44′14″E

Geography
- Location within Bavaria
- Location: Bavaria, Germany

Auerberg is a foothill of the Alps in Allgäu, Bavaria, Germany. It has a better known sibling, Hoher Peißenberg, 22 km air-line distance to the northeast. Attached to the little church building (St. George's) on the summit, there is an observation platform, reachable via a tight staircase in the tower, which offers great views. An impressive experience is also when the church bells ring just next to you.
