= Marcus Ruddle =

Irish cricketer (1905–1986)

Personal information
- Full name: Marcus Poole Ruddle
- Born: 16 January 1905; Dublin, Ireland
- Died: 25 February 1986 (aged 81); Dublin, Leinster, Ireland
- Batting: Right-handed
- Bowling: Right-arm medium

Domestic team information
- Years: Team
- 1937: Ireland

Career statistics
Competition	First-class
Matches	1
Runs scored	0
Batting average	0.00
100s/50s	–/–
Top score	0*
Balls bowled	48
Wickets	0
Bowling average	–
5 wickets in innings	–
10 wickets in match	–
Best bowling	–
Catches/stumpings	–/–
- Source: Cricinfo, 2 November 2018

Marcus Poole Ruddle (16 January 1905 – 25 February 1986) was an Irish first-class cricketer.

Ruddle was born at Lansdowne in Dublin in December 1905, and was educated in the city at Earlsfort House School. Ruddle initially played his club cricket for Pembroke and Phoenix, before playing for Clontarf. He later played a single appearance in first-class cricket for Ireland against the English Minor Counties cricket team at Dublin in 1937. Batting twice in the match, Ruddle ended Ireland's first-innings unbeaten without scoring, while in their second-innings he was dismissed without scoring by Leslie Jones. Across both Minor Counties innings', he bowled eight wicket-less overs. Outside of cricket he worked in banking. In later years, Ruddle was active in promoting youth cricket. He died at Dublin in January 1905.
