= Johansson =

Origin
- Language: Germanic
- Meaning: "son of Johan"
- Region of origin: Sweden

Other names
- Variant forms: Johanson, Johansen

Johansson is a patronymic family name of Swedish origin meaning "son of Johan", or "Johan's son". It is the most common Swedish family name, followed by Andersson. (First 18 surnames ends -sson.) The Danish, Norwegian, German and Dutch variant is Johansen, while the most common spelling in the US is Johnson. There are still other spellings. Johansson is also a given name.

== People ==
=== A ===
- Acko Ankarberg Johansson (born 1964), Swedish politician
- Adam Johansson (born 1983), Swedish football player
- Adam Byström Johansson (born 1996), Swedish ice hockey player
- Åke Johansson (1928–2014), Swedish footballer
- Albert Johansson (born 2001), Swedish ice hockey player
- Alexander Johansson (footballer, born 1995) (born 1995), Swedish footballer
- Alexander Johansson (footballer, born 2000) (born 2000), Swedish footballer
- Alexander Johansson (ice hockey) (born 1988), Swedish ice hockey player
- Alfred Johansson (diver) (1876–1941), Swedish diver
- Alfred Johansson (football manager) (born 1990), Swedish football manager
- Allan Dahl Johansson (born 1998), Norwegian speed skater
- Alma Johansson (1880–1974), Swedish missionary
- Anders Johansson (artist manager) (born 1973), Swedish music manager
- Anders Johansson (drummer) (born 1962), Swedish drummer
- Anders Johansson (football manager) (born 1967), Swedish football manager
- Anders Johansson (table tennis) (born 1955), Swedish table tennis player
- Anders Johansson (comedian) (born 1974), Swedish actor
- Andreas Johansson (footballer, born 1978), Swedish footballer
- Andreas Johansson (footballer, born 1982), Swedish footballer
- Andreas Johansson (ice hockey) (born 1973), Swedish ice hockey player
- Anita Johansson (figure skater) (born 1954), Swedish figure skater
- Anita Johansson (politician) (born 1944), Swedish politician
- Ann-Kristine Johansson (born 1962), Swedish politician
- Ann-Sofie Johansson, Swedish fashion designer
- Anna Johansson (dancer) (1860–1917), Russian ballerina
- Anna Johansson (ice hockey), Swedish ice hockey player
- Anna Johansson (politician) (born 1971), Swedish politician
- Anna-Maria Johansson (born 1982), Swedish handball player
- Annelie Johansson (born 1978), Swedish long-distance runner
- Annika Johansson (born 1967), Swedish freestyle skier
- Anton Johansson (ice hockey) (born 2004), Swedish ice hockey player
- Anton Johansson (orienteer) (born 1994), Swedish orienteer
- Arne Johansson (ice hockey) (1915–1956), Swedish ice hockey player
- Arne Johansson (orienteer) (born 1950), Swedish orienteering competitor
- Axel Johansson (rower) (1885–1973), Swedish rower
- Axel Johansson (speed skater) (1910–1983), Swedish speed skater
- Axelina Johansson (born 2000), Swedish shot putter

=== B ===
- Barbro Cecilia Johansson (1912–1999), Swedish-Tanzanian missionary
- Bengt Johansson (handball) (1942–2022), Swedish handball player and coach
- Bengt Johansson (wrestler) (1926–2008), Swedish wrestler
- Bengt K. Å. Johansson (1937–2021), Swedish politician
- Bengt-Anders Johansson (born 1951), Swedish politician
- Bengt-Arne Johansson (officer) (1943–2025), Swedish lieutenant-general
- Bengt-Arne Johansson (sledge hockey), Swedish ice sledge hockey player
- Bengt-Gösta Johansson (born 1944), Swedish ice sledge hockey player
- Benny Johansson (born 1947), Swedish handball player
- Bernt Johansson (born 1953), Swedish cyclist
- Bertil Johansson (1935–2021), Swedish footballer
- Bertil Johansson (footballer, born 1902), Swedish footballer
- Bertil Johansson (footballer, born 1929), Swedish footballer
- Bertil Johansson (politician) (1930–2018), Swedish politician
- Birger Johansson (1910–1940), Finnish canoeist
- Birger Johansson (diplomat) (1887–1975), Swedish diplomat
- Birgitta Johansson (born 1943), Swedish orienteering competitor
- Björn Johansson (cyclist) (born 1963), Swedish cyclist
- Björn Johansson (ice hockey) (born 1956), Swedish ice hockey player
- Bo Johansson (1942–2026), Swedish footballer
- Bo Johansson (weightlifter) (born 1945), Swedish weightlifter
- Boris Johansson (born 1936), Swedish footballer
- Bosse Johansson (chairman) (born 1965), Swedish businessman
- Brita Johansson (born 1941), Finnish long jumper
- Bror Johansson (1921–2009), Finnish sailor

=== C ===
- Calle Johansson (born 1967), Swedish ice hockey player and coach
- Camilla Johansson (swimmer) (born 1974), Swedish swimmer
- Camilla Johansson (triple jumper) (born 1976), Swedish triple jumper
- Carl Johansson (footballer, born 1994) (born 1994), Swedish footballer
- Carl Johansson (footballer, born 1998) (born 1998), Swedish footballer
- Carl Edvard Johansson (1864–1943), Swedish inventor and scientist
- Catrine Johansson (born 1991), Swedish footballer
- Christer Johansson (skier) (born 1950), Swedish cross-country skier
- Christer Johansson (poker player) (born 1970), Swedish poker player
- Christer Johansson (table tennis) (born 1944), Swedish table tennis player
- Christian Johansson (1817–1903), Swedish-Russian ballet teacher
- Christian S. Johansson (born 1972), American government official in Maryland
- Conny Johansson (born 1971), Swedish footballer
- Crystal C. Watkins Johansson, American neuroscientist
- Cyrillus Johansson (1884–1959), Swedish architect

=== D ===
- Dan Johansson (born 1950), Swedish speed skater
- Daniel Johansson (footballer) (born 1987), Swedish footballer
- Daniel Johansson (ice hockey) (born 1981), Swedish ice hockey player
- Daniel Johansson (tenor) (born 1980), Swedish tenor
- David Johansson (diplomat) (born 1935), Finnish diplomat
- David Johansson (skier) (1926–2005), Swedish cross-country skier
- Denis Johansson (1928–1991), Finnish middle-distance runner
- Donald Johansson (1913–2004), Swedish cross-country skier
- Douglas Johansson (born 1960), Swedish actor

=== E ===
- Ejner Johansson (1922–2001), Danish art historian and author
- Elin Johansson (born 1990), Swedish taekwondo practitioner
- Elin Johansson (footballer) (born 1992), Swedish footballer
- Elina Johansson (born 1986), Swedish footballer
- Elinore Johansson (born 1996), Swedish handball player
- Elis Johansson (1897–1956), Swedish middle-distance runner
- Elsa Johansson (1888–1981), Swedish politician
- Elsie Johansson (1931–2025), Swedish writer
- Emil Johansson (boxer) (1907–1986), Swedish boxer
- Emil Johansson (floorball) (born 1992), Swedish floorball player
- Emil Johansson (footballer) (born 1986), Swedish footballer
- Emil Johansson (ice hockey) (born 1996), Swedish ice hockey player
- Emil Johansson (sprinter) (born 2002), Swedish sprinter
- Emma Johansson (born 1983), Swedish cyclist
- Emma Johansson (orienteer) (born 1981), Swedish orienteering competitor
- Eric Johansson (athlete) (1904–1972), Swedish hammer thrower
- Eric Johansson (handballer) (born 2000), Swedish handball player
- Eric Johansson (ice hockey) (born 1982), Swedish-Canadian ice hockey player
- Erica Johansson (born 1974), Swedish long jumper
- Erica Udén Johansson (born 1989), Swedish ice hockey player
- Erik Johansson (artist) (born 1985), Swedish-born artist based in Prague
- Erik Johansson (footballer, born 1976), Swedish footballer
- Erik Johansson (ice hockey) (1927–1992), Swedish ice hockey player
- Erik Johansson (orienteer) (born 1947), Swedish orienteering competitor
- Erik Johansson (pentathlete) (born 1974), Swedish modern pentathlete
- Erik Johansson (racing driver) (born 1996), Swedish racing driver
- Erik Johansson (rower) (1911–1961), Swedish rower
- Erkki Johansson (1917–1984), Finnish wrestler
- Erland Johansson (born 1960), Swedish sports shooter
- Eva Johansson (born 1958), Danish operatic soprano
- Eva Johansson (politician) (born 1947), Swedish politician
- Evert Johansson (1903–1990), Finnish canoeist

=== F ===
- Filip Johansson (footballer) (1902–1976), Swedish footballer
- Filip Johansson (ice hockey) (born 2000), Swedish ice hockey player
- Frans Johansson (born 2000), American writer and public speaker
- Fredrik Johansson (bandy) (born 1984), Swedish bandy player
- Fredrik Johansson (cyclist) (born 1978), Swedish cyclist
- Fredrik Johansson (ice hockey) (born 1984), Swedish ice hockey player
- Fredrik Johansson (orienteer) (born 1986), Swedish orienteering competitor
- Fredrik Johansson (ski jumper) (born 1974), Swedish ski jumper
- Fredrik Edvard Johansson (1871–1918), Commander during the Finnish Civil War
- Fritz Johansson (1893–1971), Swedish wrestler

=== G ===
- Gabriel Johansson (born 2000), Swedish footballer
- Georg Johansson (footballer) (1910–1996), Swedish footballer
- Georg Johansson (ice hockey) (1898–1964), Swedish ice hockey and bandy player
- Gerda Johansson (1891–1965), Swedish diver
- Gerry Johansson (born 1945), Swedish photographer
- Göran Johansson (politician) (1945–2014), Swedish politician
- Göran Johansson (rower) (1957–2021), Swedish rower
- Göran Johansson (speed skater, born 1941), Swedish speed skater
- Göran Johansson (speed skater, born 1958), Swedish speed skater
- Gösta Johansson (1929–1997), Swedish ice hockey player
- Gottfrid Johansson (1891–1962), Swedish footballer
- Greta Johansson (1895-1978), Swedish diver and swimmer
- Gunnar Johansson (canoeist) (1919–1998), Swedish canoeist
- Gunnar Johansson (composer) (1906–1991), Swedish composer
- Gunnar Johansson (diver) (1924–1997), Swedish diver
- Gunnar Johansson (footballer) (1924–2003), Swedish footballer and manager
- Gunnar Johansson (immunologist) (born 1938), Swedish immunologist
- Gunnar Johansson (psychophysicist) (1911–1998), Swedish psychophysicist
- Gunnar Johansson (water polo) (born 1957), Swedish water polo player
- Gunnel Johansson (1922–2013), Swedish gymnast
- Gustaf Johansson (bishop) (1844–1930), Finnish archbishop of Turku
- Gustaf Johansson (ice hockey) (1900–1971), Swedish ice hockey and bandy player
- Gustaf Torsten Johansson, Swedish philatelist
- Gustav Johansson (born 1999), Swedish racing cyclist

=== H ===
- Hanna Johansson (cyclist) (born 1985), Swedish cyclist
- Hans Johansson (bandy) (born 1962), Swedish bandy player
- Hans Johansson (equestrian) (1927–2012), Swedish equestrian
- Hans-Göran Johansson (born 1958), Swedish politician
- Hans-Olof Johansson (1936–2022), Swedish sprinter
- Harry Johansson (1928–2010), Swedish canoeist
- Helen Johansson (born 1965), Swedish footballer
- Helena Johansson (born 1901), Swedish singer-songwriter
- Helge Johansson (1905–1937), Swedish ice hockey player
- Helmer Johansson (1895–1955), Swedish politician
- Henna Johansson (born 1991), Swedish freestyle wrestler
- Henry Johansson (1897–1979), Swedish ice hockey player
- Herman Johansson (born 1997), Swedish footballer
- Hjalmar Johansson (1874–1957), Swedish sportsman
- Holger Johansson (1911–1992), Swedish footballer
- Hugo Johansson (1887–1977), Swedish sport shooter

=== I ===
- Inge Johansson (born 1977), Swedish musician
- Inge Johansson (chess player) (1916–1966), Swedish chess player
- Ingebrigt Johansson (1904–1987), Norwegian mathematician
- Ingemar Johansson (1932–2009), Swedish boxer
- Ingemar Johansson (race walker) (1924–2009), Swedish racewalker
- Ingrid Johansson (born 1965), Swedish footballer
- Irma Johansson (born 1932), Swedish cross-country skier
- Irwi Johansson (born 1954), Swedish swimmer
- Ivar Johansson (director) (1889–1963), Swedish film director and writer
- Ivar Johansson (politician) (1899–1994), Swedish politician
- Ivar Johansson (wrestler) (1903–1979), Swedish wrestler

=== J ===
- Jake Johansson, American politician
- Jakob Johansson (born 1990), Swedish footballer
- Jakob Johansson (footballer, born 1998) (born 1998), Danish footballer
- Jakob Johansson (ice hockey) (born 1979), Swedish ice hockey player
- Jan Johansson (bobsleigh) (born 1943), Swedish bobsledder
- Jan Johansson (bluegrass musician) (born 1958), Swedish-born American musician
- Jan Johansson (jazz musician) (1931–1968), Swedish jazz pianist
- Janne Johansson, Swedish football chairman
- Jean Johansson, Scottish television presenter and property expert
- Jennie Johansson (born 1988), Swedish swimmer
- Jenny Johansson (born 1977), Swedish orienteering competitor
- Jens Johansson (born 1963), Swedish keyboardist
- Jerker Johansson (born 1956), Swedish banker
- Jesper Johansson (born 1993), Swedish ice hockey player
- Joachim Johansson (born 1982), Swedish tennis player
- Johan Johansson (musician) (born 1961), Swedish writer and musician
- Johan J. Johansson (1870–1948), US Navy sailor and Medal of Honor recipient
- Johan Petter Johansson (1853–1943), Swedish inventor and industrialist
- Johanna Johansson (born 1977), Swedish golfer
- Jon Johansson (born 1961), New Zealand political scientist
- Jonas Johansson (ice hockey, born 1982), Swedish ice hockey player
- Jonas Johansson (ice hockey, born 1984) (born 1984), Swedish ice hockey player
- Jonas Johansson (ice hockey, born 1995) (born 1995), Swedish ice hockey player
- Jonatan Johansson (footballer) (born 1975), Finnish footballer and coach
- Jonatan Johansson (snowboarder) (1980–2006), Swedish snowboarder
- Jonathan Johansson (ice hockey) (born 1991), Swedish ice hockey player
- Jonathan Johansson (musician) (born 1980), Swedish musician and singer-songwriter
- Jonny Johansson, Swedish fashion director
- Jörgen Johansson (1947–2010), Swedish politician
- Josef Johansson (born 1993), Swedish pop singer and songwriter
- Josefin Johansson (born 1988), Swedish footballer
- Jumani Johansson (1973–2019), Malawian-Swedish man

=== K ===
- Kai Johansson (born 1969), Finnish swimmer
- Kalle Johansson (ice hockey) (born 1993), Swedish ice hockey player
- Kalle Johansson (singer) (born 1997), Swedish singer
- Kari Johansson (born 1947), Finnish ice hockey player
- Karin Johansson (born 1986), Swedish canoeist
- Karl Johansson (born 2000), Swedish orienteering competitor
- Karl Henrik Johansson (born 1967), Swedish researcher
- Karl-Erik Johansson (1924–1987), Finnish rower
- Katrin Johansson, Finnish singer
- Katrina Johansson (born 1953), Musical artist
- Kenneth Johansson (1956–2021), Swedish politician
- Kent Johansson (born 1956), Swedish ice hockey player and coach
- Kent-Olle Johansson (born 1960), Swedish wrestler
- Kim Marie Johansson, Swedish murderer
- Kjell Johansson (table tennis) (1946–2011), Swedish table tennis player
- Kjell Johansson (tennis) (born 1951), Swedish tennis player
- Klas Johansson (born 1956), Swedish footballer
- Knut Johansson (footballer, born 1892) (1892–1961), Finnish footballer
- Knut Johansson (footballer, born 1902) (1902–1987), Swedish footballer
- Knut Johansson (footballer, born 1918) (1918–2001), Swedish footballer
- Kristian Johansson (1907–1984), Norwegian ski jumper
- Kurt Johansson (mathematician) (born 1960), Swedish mathematician
- Kurt Johansson (sport shooter) (1914–2011), Swedish sport shooter

=== L ===
- Lars Johansson (bandy) (born 1976), Swedish retired bandy player
- Lars Johansson (ice hockey) (born 1987), Swedish ice hockey player
- Lars Johansson (politician) (born 1950), Swedish politician
- Lars Johansson (sailor) (born 1953), Swedish sailor
- Lars-Ove Johansson (1938–2019), Swedish footballer
- Lasse Johansson (footballer) (born 1975), Swedish footballer
- Leif Johansson (bobsleigh) (born 1950), Swedish bobsledder
- Leif Johansson (businessman) (born 1951), Swedish businessman
- Leif Johansson (tennis) (born 1952), Swedish tennis player
- Lena Johansson (born 1969), Swedish politician
- Lennart Johansson (1929–2019), Swedish football administrator
- Lennart Johansson (ice hockey) (1941–2010), Swedish ice hockey player
- Leo Johansson (born 1999), Swedish cross country skier
- Lilian Johansson (born 1948), Swedish actress
- Lina Johansson (born 1988), Swedish figure skater
- Linnéa Johansson (born 2002), Swedish ice hockey player
- Linnea Johansson (golfer) (born 1993), Swedish professional golfer
- Linus Johansson (born 1992), Swedish ice hockey player
- Lisa Johansson (ice hockey) (born 1992), Swedish ice hockey player
- Liselotte Johansson (born 1970), Swedish freestyle skier
- Lloyd Johansson (born 1985), Australia international rugby union player

=== M ===
- Magnus Johansson (footballer, born 1964), Swedish football player and manager
- Magnus Johansson (footballer, born 1971), Swedish footballer
- Magnus Johansson (handball coach) (born 1969), Swedish handball player (1969-)
- Magnus Johansson (ice hockey) (born 1973), Swedish ice hockey player
- Maj-Britt Johansson (1928–2015), Swedish archer
- Majken Johansson (1930–1993), Swedish poet, writer and Salvation Army soldier
- Marcus Johansson (footballer, born 1993), Swedish footballer
- Marcus Johansson (footballer, born 1994), Swedish footballer
- Marcus Johansson (ice hockey, born 1979), Swedish ice hockey player
- Marcus Johansson (ice hockey, born 1990), Swedish ice hockey player
- Maria Johansson (born 1956), Swedish actress
- Marita Johansson (born 1984), Swedish speed skater
- Marko Johansson (born 1998), Swedish footballer
- Markus Johansson (born 1984), American musician
- Märta Johansson (diver) (1907–1998), Swedish diver
- Märta Johansson (politician) (1935–2023), Swedish politician
- Martin Johansson (bandy) (born 1987), Swedish professional bandy player
- Martin Johansson (bishop) (1837–1908), Swedish bishop
- Martin Johansson (ice hockey, born 1975), Swedish ice hockey player
- Martin Johansson (ice hockey, born 1977), Swedish ice hockey player
- Martin Johansson (ice hockey, born 1987), Swedish ice hockey player
- Martin Johansson (orienteer, born 1964), Swedish orienteering competitor
- Martin Johansson (orienteer, born 1984), Swedish orienteering competitor
- Martin Johansson (speed skater) (born 1973), Swedish speed skater
- Martin Emanuel Johansson (1918–1999), Swedish chess player
- Martina Johansson (born 1975), Swedish politician
- Mathias Johansson (ice hockey) (born 1974), Swedish ice hockey player
- Mathias Johansson (producer), Swedish songwriter and record producer
- Mathilde Johansson (born 1985), French tennis player
- Mats Johansson (footballer) (born 1962), Swedish footballer
- Mats Johansson (politician) (1951–2017), Swedish politician
- Mats Johansson (sailor) (born 1956), Swedish sailor
- Mats Johansson (skier) (born 1971), Swedish freestyle skier
- Mattias Johansson (born 1992), Swedish footballer
- Mattias Bäckström Johansson (born 1985), Swedish politician
- Mauritz Johansson (1881–1966), Swedish sport shooter
- Micael Johansson (born 1960), Swedish business executive, president and CEO of Saab AB
- Michaela Johansson (born 1988), Swedish tennis player
- Mika Johansson (born 1984), Finnish footballer
- Mikael Johansson (ice hockey, born 1966), Swedish ice hockey player and coach
- Mikael Johansson (ice hockey, born 1981), Swedish ice hockey player
- Mikael Johansson (ice hockey, born 1985), Swedish ice hockey player
- Mikael Johansson (ice hockey, born 1995), Swedish ice hockey player
- Mikael Johansson (politician) (born 1960), Swedish politician
- Morgan Johansson (born 1970), Swedish politician

=== N ===
- Nanna Johansson (born 1986), Swedish cartoonist and a radio presenter
- Nicklas Johansson (born 1984), Swedish ice hockey player
- Nils Johansson (cyclist) (1920–1999), Swedish cyclist
- Nils Johansson (ice hockey, born 1904) (1904–1936), Swedish sportsperson
- Nils Johansson (ice hockey, born 1938) (born 1938), Swedish ice hockey player
- Nils Johansson (politician) (1864–1941), Swedish politician
- Nils Patrik Johansson (born 1967), Swedish heavy metal singer
- Nils-Eric Johansson (born 1980), Swedish footballer

=== O ===
- Ola Johansson (footballer) (born 1975), Swedish footballer
- Ola Johansson (politician) (born 1960), Politician and Member of the parliament of Sweden
- Olle Johansson (sailor) (born 1957), Swedish sailor
- Olle Johansson (swimmer) (1927–1994), Swedish swimmer
- Olof Johansson (born 1937), Swedish politician
- Oscar Johansson (ice hockey) (born 1988), Swedish ice hockey player
- Oscar Johansson (politician) (1882–1947), Finnish politician
- Oskar Johansson (born 1977), Canadian sailor
- Oskar Johansson (footballer) (born 1990), Swedish footballer
- Osvald Johansson (1932–1975), Swedish cyclist
- Ove Johansson (1948–2023), Swedish American football player
- Ove Johansson (weightlifter) (1943–2025), Swedish weightlifter

=== P ===
- Paavo Johansson (1895-1983), Finnish javelin thrower
- Pär Johansson (born 1970), Swedish screenwriter
- Patrick Johansson (bandy) (born 1963), Swedish bandy coach and former player
- Patrick Johansson (historian) (born 1946), French-Mexican historian and anthropologist
- Patrik Johansson (bandy) (born 1988), Swedish Bandy player
- Patrik Johansson (footballer) (born 1968), Swedish footballer and manager
- Patrik Johansson (volleyball) (born 1963), Swedish volleyball player
- Paul Johansson (born 1964), Canadian actor
- Per Johansson (footballer, born 1978), Swedish footballer
- Per Johansson (footballer, born 1989), Swedish footballer
- Per Johansson (handballer) (born 1970), Swedish handball coach
- Per Johansson (swimmer) (born 1963), Swedish swimmer
- Per Johansson (trade unionist) (born 1960), Swedish trade unionist
- Per Magnus Johansson (born 1950), Swedish psychoanalyst, psychotherapist and historian of ideas
- Per-Johan Johansson (born 1968), Swedish ice hockey player
- Per-Ulrik Johansson (born 1966), Swedish professional golfer
- Peter Johansson (Danish footballer) (born 1948), Danish footballer
- Peter Johansson (figure skater) (born 1967), Swedish figure skater
- Peter Johansson (motorcyclist) (born 1966), Swedish motocross rider
- Peter Johansson (musician) (born 1977), Swedish actor-singer
- Peter Johansson (Swedish footballer) (born 1955), Swedish footballer and manager
- Peter Friis Johansson (born 1983), Swedish classical pianist
- Petra Johansson (born 1988), Swedish footballer
- Pia Johansson (born 1960), Swedish actress
- Piotr Johansson (born 1995), Swedish footballer
- Pontus Johansson (born 1991), Swedish ice hockey player
- Pontus Johansson (ice hockey, born 2001) (born 2001), Swedish ice hockey player

=== R ===
- Ragnar Johansson (1911–2002), Swedish ice hockey player
- Rasmus Johansson (born 1995), Danish footballer and futsal player
- Rebekah Johansson (1981–2011), Swedish model
- Reginald Johansson (1925–2007), New Zealand field hockey player
- Richard Johansson (1882–1952), Swedish figure skater
- Robert Johansson (born 1990), Norwegian ski jumper
- Roger Johansson (born 1967), Swedish ice hockey player
- Roland Johansson (boxer) (1930–2005), Swedish boxer
- Roland Johansson (swimmer) (1909–1979), Swedish swimmer
- Rolf Johansson (born 1944), Swedish Paralympic athlete
- Rosa Lie Johansson (1953–2004), Swedish-Mexican painter
- Rudolf Johansson (1899–1994), Swedish middle-distance runner
- Rune Johansson (1920–1998), Swedish ice hockey player
- Rune B. Johansson (1915–1982), Swedish social democrat politician
- Ryan Johansson (born 2001), Luxembourgish footballer

=== S ===
- Sabina Johansson (born 1973), Swedish wheelchair curler
- Sara Johansson (footballer) (born 1980), Swedish footballer
- Sara Margareta Johansson, the birthname of Sara Johansson (handballer) (born 1992), Swedish handball player
- Scarlett Johansson (born 1984), American actress
- Sebastian Johansson (born 1980), Swedish footballer
- Sebastian Johansson (American football) (born 1991), Swedish-born American football player
- Selfrid Johansson (1907–1976), Swedish boxer
- Sigvard Johansson, Swedish canoeist
- Simon Johansson (born 1999), Swedish ice hockey player
- Simon Johansson (footballer) (born 1993), Swedish footballer
- Sixten Johansson (1910–1991), Swedish ski jumper
- Sofia Johansson (born 1969), Swedish footballer
- Sofie Johansson (born 1985), Swedish orienteering competitor
- Sonny Johansson (born 1948), Swedish footballer and manager
- Sören Johansson (born 1954), Swedish ice hockey player
- Søren Wulff Johansson (1971–2020), Danish decathlete
- Stefan Johansson (born 1956), Swedish racing driver
- Stefan Johansson (ice hockey) (born 1988), Swedish ice hockey player
- Stefan Johansson (race walker) (born 1967), Swedish racewalker
- Stig Johansson (linguist) (1939–2010), Swedish-Norwegian linguist
- Stig Johansson (water polo) (1924–2007), Swedish water polo player
- Stig H. Johansson (born 1945), Swedish horse trainer and driver
- Stig-Göran Johansson (1943–2002), Swedish ice hockey player
- Svante Johansson (1927–1986), Swedish diver
- Sven Johansson (canoeist) (1912–1953), Swedish canoeist
- Sven Johansson (cyclist) (1914–1982), Swedish cyclist
- Sven Johansson (politician, 1928–2023) (1928–2023), Swedish politician
- Sven Johansson (politician, born 1916) (1916–1987), Swedish politician
- Sven Johansson (sport shooter) (born 1945), Swedish sport shooter
- Sven-Åke Johansson (1943–2025), Swedish musician
- Sven-Bertil Johansson (born 1956), Swedish sailor
- Sven-Göran Johansson (born 1943), Swedish swimmer
- Sverker Johansson (born 1961), Swedish physicist and Wikipedian

=== T ===
- Ted Johansson (born 1992), Swedish ice hockey player
- Thea Johansson (born 2002), Swedish ice hockey player
- Thomas Johansson (born 1975), Swedish tennis player
- Thomas Johansson (footballer, born 1961), Swedish footballer
- Thomas Johansson (footballer, born 1966), Swedish footballer
- Thomas Johansson (ice hockey) (born 1970), Swedish ice hockey player
- Thorsten Johansson (1950–2021), Swedish sprinter
- Thure Johansson (athlete) (1888–1970), Swedish long-distance runner
- Thure Johansson (wrestler) (1912–1986), Swedish freestyle wrestler
- Tilde Johansson (born 2001), Swedish athletics competitor
- Tim Johansson (born 1901), Swedish Paralympic athlete
- Tobias Johansson (born 1982), Swedish footballer
- Tomas Johansson (badminton) (born 1969), Swedish badminton player
- Tomas Johansson (snowboarder) (born 1979), Swedish snowboarder
- Tomas Johansson (sport shooter) (born 1974), Swedish sports shooter
- Tomas Johansson (wrestler) (born 1962), Swedish Greco-Roman wrestler
- Tommy Johansson (musician) (born 1987), Swedish guitarist and singer
- Tommy Johansson (speedway rider) (born 1950), Swedish speedway rider
- Tommy Johansson (sprinter) (born 1958), Swedish athlete
- Torbjörn Johansson (born 1970), Swedish middle-distance runner
- Tord Johansson (1955–2015), Swedish businessman
- Tore Johansson (born 1959), Swedish record producer, composer and musician
- Tore Johansson (rower) (1920–2002), Swedish rower
- Torsten Johansson (footballer) (1906–1989), Swedish footballer
- Torsten Johansson (tennis) (1920–2004), Swedish tennis player

=== U ===
- Ulf Johansson (born 1967), Swedish biathlete

=== V ===
- Victor Johansson (born 1998), Swedish swimmer
- Victor Johansson (ice hockey) (born 2006), Swedish ice hockey player
- Vidar Johansson (born 1996), Swedish long-distance runner
- Viktor Johansson (born 1998), Swedish footballer
- Viktoria Johansson (born 1974), Swedish chess player

=== W ===
- Warren Johansson (1934–1994), American philologist
- Wiktoria Johansson (born 1996), Swedish singer and songwriter
- Wiwi-Anne Johansson (born 1950), Swedish politician

=== Y ===
- Ylva Johansson (born 1964), Swedish politician
- Yngve Johansson (footballer), Swedish footballer
- Yngve Johansson (ice hockey) (1929–2002), Swedish ice hockey player
