= Bertil Johansson (disambiguation) =

Bertil Johansson may refer to:

- Bertil Johansson (1935–2021), Swedish footballer
- Bertil Johansson (footballer, born 1902), Swedish footballer, died 1975
- Bertil Johansson (footballer, born 1929), Swedish footballer, died 2005
- Bertil Johansson (politician) (1930–2018)
