= Johansen =

Origin
- Origin: Germanic
- Meaning: "son of Johan"
- Region of origin: Scandinavia

Other names
- Variant forms: Johansson, Johanson, Johnson

Johansen is a Scandinavian patronymic surname meaning "son of Johan". It is most common in Denmark and Norway. The Swedish variant is Johansson, while the most common spelling in the US is Johanson. There are still other spellings. Johansen is an uncommon given name. People with the surname Johansen include:

- Allan Johansen (born 1971), Danish professional road bicycle racer
- Anders Johansen
- August E. Johansen (1905–1995), U.S. Representative from Michigan
- Bård Tufte Johansen (born 1969), Norwegian comedian
- William Odd "Red" Johansen (1928–2001), Canadian professional ice hockey player
- Bjørn Johansen (footballer) (born 1969), Norwegian footballer
- Bjørn Johansen (ice hockey) (born 1944), Norwegian ice hockey player
- Bjørn Johansen (musician) (1940–2002), Norwegian jazz musician
- Christian Johansen
- Dan Anton Johansen (born 1979), Danish professional footballer
- Darryl Johansen (born 1959), Australian chess Grandmaster
- David Johansen (1950–2025), American singer, songwriter, and actor
- Egil Johansen (musician) (1934–1998), Norwegian-Swedish jazz drummer
- Egil Johansen (footballer) (born 1962), Norwegian footballer
- Egil Johansen (orienteer) (born 1954), Norwegian orienteer
- Egil Borgen Johansen (1934–1993), Norwegian archer
- Elisabeth Johansen (1907–1993), Greenlandic midwife and politician
- Eva Margot (born Johansen, 1944–2019), Norwegian painter
- Magnet (musician) (born Even Johansen in 1970), Norwegian singer-songwrite
- Franz M. Johansen (1928–2018), American sculptor, emeritus professor at BYU
- Gotfred Johansen (1895–1978), Danish lightweight professional boxer
- H. W. "Woody" Johansen (1913–1991), American engineer and namesake of the Johansen Expressway
- Hanna Johansen (1939–2023), Swiss writer
- Hans Johansen (1897–1973), Russian-Danish zoologist
- Helga Johansen (1852–1912), Danish novelist
- Henry Johansen (1904–1988), Norwegian international football goalkeeper
- Hermann Johansen (1866–1930), Russian zoologist
- Hjalmar Johansen (1867–1913), Norwegian polar explorer
- Holger Hott Johansen (born 1974), Norwegian orienteering competitor
- Iris Johansen (born 1938), American author
- Jacob Lerche Johansen (1818–1900), Norwegian Minister of the Navy
- Jan Johansen (canoeist) (born 1944), Norwegian Olympic canoeist
- Jan Johansen (politician) (born 1955), Danish politician and MF
- Jan Arvid Johansen (1947–2017), Norwegian musician
- Jan Johansen (born 1966), Swedish singer
- Johan Strand Johansen (1903–1970), Norwegian Minister of Labour and politician
- John Johansen (athlete) (1883–1947), Norwegian sprinter
- John Christen Johansen (1876–1964), Danish-American portraitist
- John M. Johansen (1916–2012), American architect
- Jon Lech Johansen (born 1983), Norwegian known for reverse engineering data formats
- K. V. Johansen (born 1968), Canadian fantasy and children's author
- K. W. Johansen (born ?), Author of the yield theory for connections (1949)
- Kevin Johansen (born 1964), Argentine-American rock musician
- Kyle Johansen (born 1967), American politician
- Lars Emil Johansen (born 1946), second Prime Minister of Greenland
- Lucas Johansen (born 1997), Canadian ice hockey player
- Magne Johansen (born 1965), Norwegian ski jumper
- Marthe Kråkstad Johansen (born 1999), Norwegian biathlete
- Mathias Hove Johansen (born 1998), Norwegian sprinter
- Michael Johansen (born 1972), Danish professional football player
- Pete Johansen violin player, session member of bands Sirenia, Tristania and others
- Ravi (Ivar Johansen) (born 1976), Norwegian musician
- Reidar Johansen (born 1955), Norwegian politician
- Roar Johansen (1935–2015), Norwegian footballer
- Ryan Johansen (born 1992), Canadian ice hockey player
- Sharon Johansen (born 1948), Norwegian-American model and actress
- Stig Johansen (born 1972), Norwegian professional football striker
- Terje Riis Johansen (born 1968), Norwegian politician for the Norwegian Centre Party
- Thomas Kjeller Johansen (born 1965), Danish-Norwegian philosopher
- Trevor Johansen (born 1957), retired professional national hockey league player
- Tor Egil Johansen (born 1950), Norwegian footballer

== See also ==
- Maik Yohansen
