= Oscar Johansson =

Oscar Johansson may refer to:

- Oscar Johansson (ice hockey) (born 1988), Swedish ice hockey winger
- Oscar Johansson (politician) (1882–1947), Finnish lawyer, civil servant and politician
- Oscar Johansson (footballer) (born 1995), Swedish footballer

== See also ==
- Oskar Johansson (born 1977), Canadian sailor
- Oskar Johansson (footballer) (born 1990), Swedish footballer
