= Mikael Johansson =

Mikael Johansson may refer to:

- Mikael Johansson (ice hockey, born 1966), retired Swedish ice hockey player who competed in 1992 Winter Olympic Games
- Mikael Johansson (ice hockey, born 1981), Swedish ice hockey player, currently playing for Frölunda HC
- Mikael Johansson (ice hockey, born 1985), Swedish ice hockey player, 2003 draft pick of the Detroit Red Wings
- Mikael Johansson (ice hockey, born 1995), Swedish ice hockey player, currently playing for Växjö Lakers
- Mikael Johansson (politician) (born 1960), Swedish Green Party politician
