= One Last Kiss =

One Last Kiss may refer to:

== Music ==
=== Songs ===
- "One Last Kiss" (Hikaru Utada song), 2021
- "One Last Kiss" (The J. Geils Band song), 1978
- "Blow Me (One Last Kiss)", by Pink, 2012
- "One Last Kiss", by Katrin Johansson, 2014
- "One Last Kiss", by Kylie Minogue from Golden, 2018
- "One Last Kiss", by Madina Lake from The Disappearance of Adalia, 2006
- "One Last Kiss", by the Other Two from Super Highways, 1999
- "One Last Kiss", by Sofia Shinas, 1992
- "One Last Kiss", by Thomai Apergi, 2013
- "One Last Kiss", written by Charles Strouse and Lee Adams for the stage musical Bye Bye Birdie, 1958

== Other uses ==
- "One Last Kiss" (Full House), a 1990 television episode
- One Last Kiss, a 1998 Fear Street Sagas novel by Brandon Alexander

== See also ==
- Last Kiss (disambiguation)
