= Per Johansson =

Per Johansson may refer to:

- Per Johansson (swimmer), Swedish swimmer
- Per Johansson (trade unionist), Swedish trade unionist
- Per Johansson (footballer born 1989), Swedish footballer
- Per Johansson (footballer born 1978), Swedish footballer
- Per Johansson (handballer), Swedish handballer
- Per Johansson (musician), Swedish saxophone player
- Pär Johansson, Swedish theatre chief
