= Patrik Johansson =

Patrik Johansson may refer to:

- Patrik Johansson (footballer) (born 1968), Swedish footballer and football manager
- Patrik Johansson (bandy) (born 1988), Swedish bandy player
- Patrik Johansson (volleyball) (born 1963), Swedish volleyball player
