= Martin Johansson =

Martin Johansson may refer to:

- Martin Johansson (bandy) (born 1987), Swedish bandy player for Villa Lidköping BK
- Martin Johansson (ice hockey, born 1975), Swedish ice hockey defenceman for IF Björklöven
- Martin Johansson (ice hockey, born 1977), Swedish ice hockey left winger for Jonstorps IF
- Martin Johansson (ice hockey, born 1987), Swedish ice hockey player for Mora IK
- Martin Johansson (orienteer, born 1964), bronze medalist at the world championships in 1991 and 1993
- Martin Johansson (orienteer, born 1984), bronze medalist at the world championships in 2007 and 2008
- Martin Johansson (bishop) (1837–1908), Swedish bishop
- Martin Johansson (speed skater) (born 1973), Swedish speed skater
- Martin Emanuel Johansson (1918–1999), Swedish chess player

== See also ==
- Martin Johansen (born 1972), Danish footballer
