= Gustaf Johansson =

Gustaf Johansson may refer to:

- Gustaf Johansson (bishop) (1844–1930), Archbishop of Turku, Finland
- Gustaf Johansson (ice hockey) (1900–1971), Swedish ice hockey player
- Gustaf Torsten Johansson, Swedish philatelist
- Gustaf Johansson (swimmer), Swedish Short Course Swimming Championships men's 200m butterfly champion 1992–1993
