= Bertil Johansson (footballer, born 1929) =

Swedish footballer

Personal information
- Date of birth: 19 March 1929
- Place of birth: Helsingborg, Sweden
- Date of death: 15 November 2005 (aged 76)
- Place of death: Helsingborg, Sweden
- Position: Midfielder

Senior career*
Years	Team	Apps	(Gls)
1950–1952	Råå	32	(6)
1952–1954	AIK Fotboll	14	(4)
Total		46	(10)

International career
1952	Sweden	1	(0)
- * Club domestic league appearances and goals

Axel Elof Bertil Johansson (19 March 1929 – 15 November 2005) was a Swedish footballer who played as a midfielder. He featured once for the Sweden national team in 1952.

== Career statistics ==
=== Club ===
Appearances and goals by club, season and competition
Club	Season	League			Cup		Other		Total	
Club	Season	Division	Apps	Goals	Apps	Goals	Apps	Goals	Apps	Goals
Råå	1950–51	Allsvenskan	12	2					12	2
Råå	1951–52	Allsvenskan	20	4					20	4
Råå	Total		32	6					32	6
AIK Fotboll	1952–53	Allsvenskan	11	4					11	4
AIK Fotboll	1953–54	Allsvenskan	3	0					3	0
AIK Fotboll	Total		14	4					14	4
Career total			46	10					46	10

=== International ===
Appearances and goals by national team and year
National team	Year	Apps	Goals
Sweden	1952	1	0
Total		1	0
