= Nils Johansson =

Nils Johansson may refer to:

- Nils Johansson (cyclist) (1920–1999), Swedish cyclist
- Nils Johansson (footballer), Swedish footballer
- Nils Johansson (ice hockey, born 1904) (1904–1936), Swedish ice hockey player
- Nils Johansson (ice hockey, born 1938), Swedish ice hockey player
- Nils Johansson (politician) (1864–1941), Swedish politician
- Nils-Eric Johansson (born 1980), Swedish football player
