= Thomas Johansson (disambiguation) =

Thomas Johansson (born 1975) is a Swedish tennis player and coach.

Thomas Johansson is also the name of:

- Thomas Johansson (footballer, born 1961), Swedish football forward for AIK
- Thomas Johansson (footballer, born 1966), Swedish footballer for Djurgården
- Thomas Johansson (Malmö FF footballer) (born 1961), Swedish footballer active 1991
- Thomas Johansson (ice hockey) (born 1970), Swedish ice hockey player

== See also ==
- Thomas Johanson (born 1969), Finnish sailor and Olympic champion
- Tomas Johansson (disambiguation)
- Tommy Johansson (disambiguation)
