= El Último Beso =

El Último Beso may refer to:

- "El Último Beso" (Vicente Fernández song), 2007
- "El Último Beso" (Tini song), 2022
- "El Último Beso", a Spanish-language version of "Last Kiss", sung by Polo
- "El Último Beso", a song by Otra Nota

== See also ==
- The Last Kiss (disambiguation)
