= Hermann Johansen =

Baltic German ornithologist (1866–1930)

Hermann Eduardovich Johansen (Russian: Герман Эдуардович Иоганзен, romanized: German Eduardovich Ioganzen; 1866–1930) was a Russian biologist and ornithologist of Baltic German descent.

== Career ==
He graduated with a degree in zoology from the University of Dorpat in 1889. He moved to Tomsk in 1893 and began teaching German, physics and natural history in the Alekseyev school. From 1899, he taught zoology and comparative anatomy at Tomsk State University. In 1918, he was appointed full professor in the chair of zoology. He held this chair until his death, and was succeeded by another Johansen, Hans Johansen, to whom he was not related.

Hermann Johansen undertook basic faunistic investigations of large areas of Siberia and was particularly an expert of bird biology. An appreciable part of his bird collections are kept at the Zoological Museum of the University of Copenhagen. They were brought there by his successor in the professor chair, Hans Johansen, when the latter was expelled from the Soviet Union by Stalin in 1937.

Of his two sons, the elder (Wolfgang Johansen) was killed as a Russian soldier in World War I, while the younger (Bodo Johansen) became a zoologist.
