= Orewa Speech =

2004 speech by New Zealand politician Don Brash

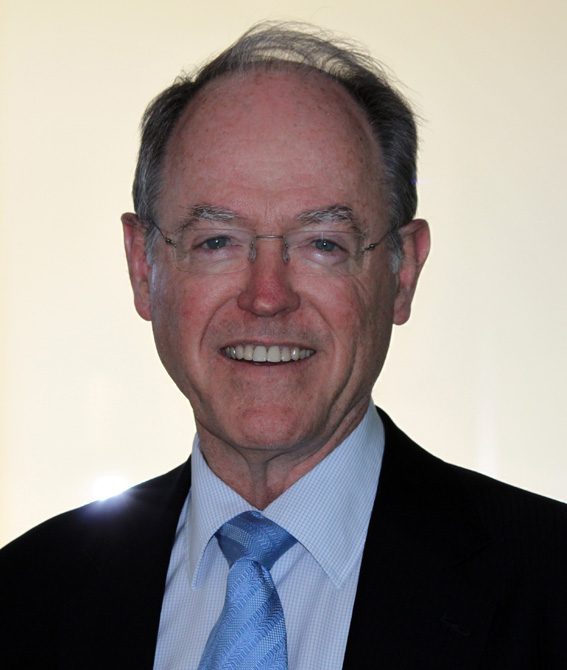
Don Brash, then newly installed as Leader of the Opposition, used the Orewa Speech to broach the topic of Māori-Pākehā relations

The Orewa Speech was a speech delivered by the leader of the New Zealand National Party, Don Brash, to the Rotary Club of Orewa on 27 January 2004. It addressed civil rights and race relations in New Zealand, particularly the status of Māori people. Brash approached the subject by advocating "one rule for all" and ending equitable measures and affirmative action for Māori, which he described as "special privileges".

== Content ==
Brash covered many aspects of the status of Māori in New Zealand society in his speech. He criticized policies he believed to be separatist, such as required levels of iwi representation on district health boards and the allocation of Māori electorate seats in Parliament – something he labelled an "anachronism". The speech made particular reference to the Labour Party's stance on the Foreshore and Seabed Act, which Brash disagreed with. He also questioned the use of Māori spiritual traditions in official events and the open-ended nature of the Treaty of Waitangi settlement process.

== Reaction ==
The speech was criticised by some people. Asked if he saw it as playing the race card, Brash said: "I didn't see the speech in that context at all." The speech itself was framed in terms of equality and pragmatism, arguing for dispensing with affirmative action programmes and poorly understood references in legislation to the principles of the Treaty of Waitangi, and ending the alleged "Treaty of Waitangi Grievance Industry", referring to the settlement process. His speech was criticised by lecturer and political writer Jon Johansson: "Whether intended or not, the Orewa speech reinforced the ignorant and racist stereotype that Māori were 'savages' before the 'gift' of European civilisation was visited upon them."

The speech resulted in a surge in support for the National Party. From 28% in the polls a month before the speech, the party jumped to 45% two weeks after it: ten points ahead of Labour.

Polls showed that many Māori were comfortable with Brash's speech, and the National Party threw its support behind it, but Georgina te Heuheu was removed as National's Māori Affairs spokeswoman after criticising it. It was instrumental in establishing a public profile for Brash, who had only recently become the party's leader.

Subsequent to the speech, Brash's catch-cry "need not race" was taken up by the other side of the political divide, the governing Labour-Progressive coalition. An audit of government programmes was put in place to determine whether there were race-based programmes where need-based programmes would suffice.

Some former New Zealand Prime Ministers have criticized the speech. Jim Bolger said in an interview published in 2017 that it was in the same frame as Donald Trump's 2016 presidential campaign, and that "some people follow absurdities". Former Labour Prime Minister Helen Clark said of Brash's motives that "he would've done a lot of opinion polling on that, and knew it would strike a chord".

== Legacy ==
Brash returned to Orewa on 25 January 2005, hoping to capitalise on the previous year's success, and gave a speech on social welfare and on welfare dependency. This speech was dubbed "Orewa 2".

== See also ==
- Treaty of Waitangi claims and settlements
