= Glada Hudik-teatern =

Swedish theatrical organization

Glada Hudik-teatern ("The Happy Hudik-theatre") is a Swedish theatrical organization, founded in Hudiksvall in 1996 by Pär Johansson. The ensemble includes adults with intellectual disabilities from Hudiksvall, among them Toralf Nilsson, Mats Melin and Maja Karlsson.

In the autumn of 2010 the documentary series with Glada Hudik-teatern Elvis i glada Hudik was broadcast in Sveriges Television.

In 2011 a film based on Glada Hudik-teatern's history, Hur många lingon finns det i världen?, was produced.
