= Tommy Johansson =

Tommy Johansson is the name of:

- Tommy Johansson (musician) or ReinXeed (born 1987), Swedish musician
- Tommy Johansson (sprinter) (born 1958), Swedish sprinter
- Tommy Johansson (speedway rider) (born 1950), Swedish speedway rider

== See also ==
- Thomas Johansson (disambiguation)
- Tomas Johansson (disambiguation)
