= Tomas Johansson =

Tomas Johansson may refer to:

- Tomas Johansson (badminton) (born 1969), Swedish badminton player at the 1996 and 2000 Summer Olympics
- Tomas Johansson (snowboarder) (born 1979), Swedish snowboarder at the 2002 Winter Olympics
- Tomas Johansson (sport shooter) (born 1974), Swedish sport shooter at the 2000 Summer Olympics
- Tomas Johansson (wrestler) (born 1962), Swedish wrestler, medalist at the 1988 and 1992 Summer Olympics

== See also ==
- Thomas Johansson (disambiguation)
- Tommy Johansson (disambiguation)
- Thomas Johanson (born 1969), Finnish sailor and Olympic champion
