= Johanson =

Origin
- Origin: Germanic
- Meaning: "son of Johan"
- Region of origin: Scandinavia

Other names
- Variant forms: Johansson, Johansen, Johnson

Johanson is a Scandinavian patronymic surname meaning "son of Johan". Including its variant spellings, it is a common surname in Norway, Sweden, and Denmark.

- Al R. Johanson (1899–1964), American lawyer and politician
- Anton Johanson (1877–1952), Swedish footballer
- Arvid Johanson (1929–2013), Norwegian politician
- Bryan Johanson (born 1951), American musician and composer
- Chris Johanson (born 1968), American artist
- Donald Johanson (born 1943), American paleoanthropologist
- Eric Johanson, American blues rock singer, guitarist, and songwriter
- George Johanson (1928–2022), American artist
- Herbert Johanson (1884–1964), Estonian architect
- Jai Johanny Johanson (born 1944), American musician
- Jay-Jay Johanson (born 1969), Swedish musician, singer, songwriter
- John Peter Johanson (1865–1937), American Medal of Honor recipient
- Klara Johanson (1875–1948), Swedish writer
- Lars Johanson (1936–2025), Swedish Turcologist and linguist
- Sue Johanson (1930–2023), Canadian writer, public speaker, registered nurse, sex educator
