= Per Magnus Johansson =

Swedish psychoanalyst, psychotherapist and historian of ideas (born 1950)

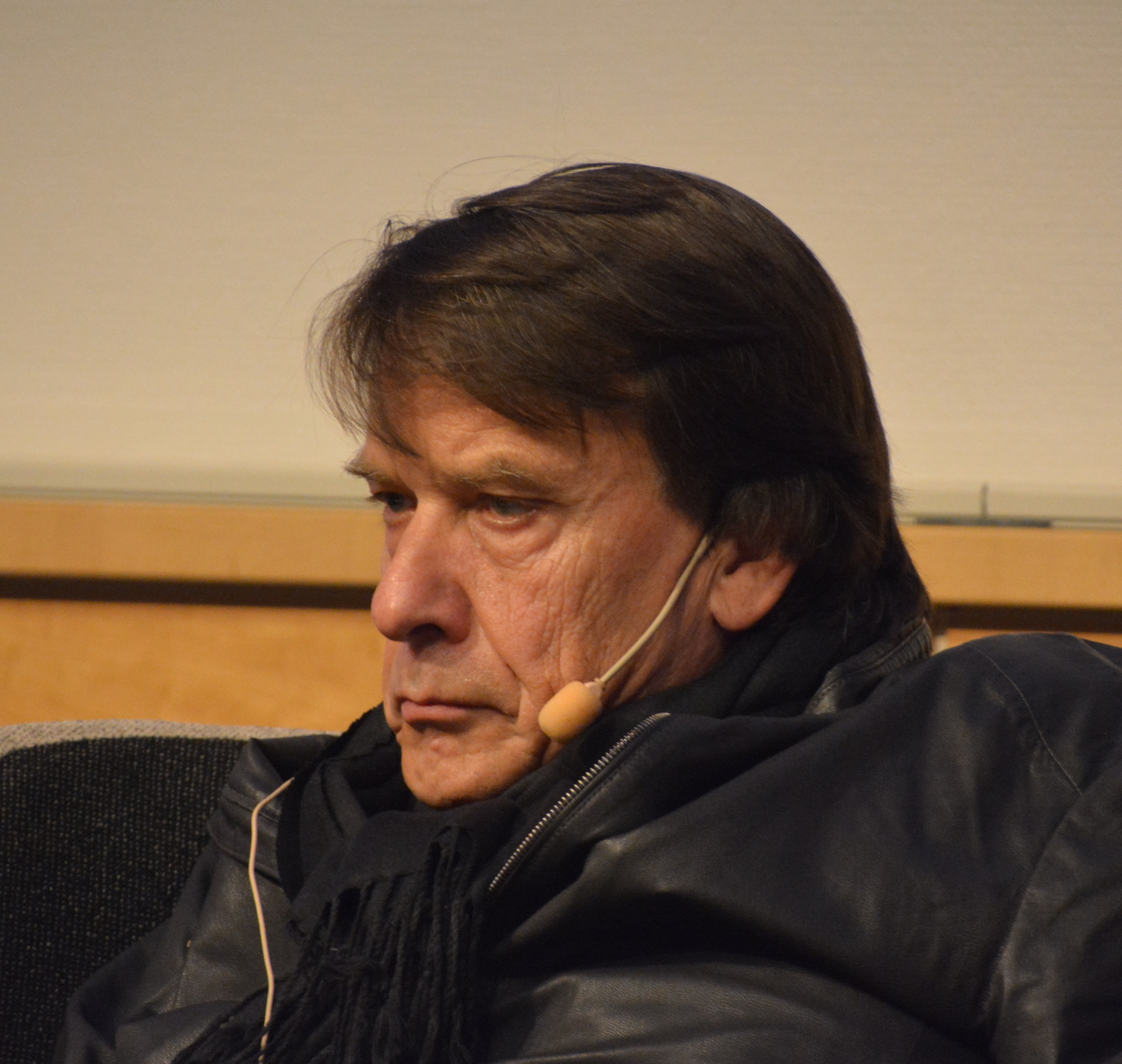
- Per Magnus Johansson at Gothenburg Book Fair 2015
- Born: 28 September 1950 (age 75); Gothenburg, Sweden
- Occupations: psychoanalyst, psychotherapist and historian of ideas

Per Magnus Johansson (born 28 September 1950) is a Swedish psychoanalyst, psychotherapist and historian of ideas. Through his research on the history of psychoanalysis in Sweden, Johansson has contributed to the understanding of the heritage of Sigmund Freud and the psychoanalytical movement in the 20th century. Johansson's psychoanalytical training took place in Paris, where he completed a training analysis with Pierre Legendre. On Pierre Legendres passing in March 2023, Johansson published an obituary in French, Italian and Swedish describing Legendres contributions to the Freudian legacy.

In the book En psykoanalytikers väg (The Path of a Psychoanalyst) Johansson is interviewed about his life and work. The book includes a French translation, Le cheminement d'un psychanalyste and a foreword by Elisabeth Roudinesco.

== Research on the history of psychoanalysis ==
Johanssons monographs are mainly written in Swedish, but his work has reached an international audience through articles in encyclopedias and journals within the field of psychoanalysis.

Johansson is an associate professor in the History of Ideas at the University of Gothenburg where he in 1999 submitted his doctoral thesis. The title of his thesis was Freuds psykoanalys (Freud's Psychoanalysis). Each of the pioneers of psychoanalysis in Sweden, Poul Bjerre, Emanuel af Geijerstam, Pehr Henrik Törngren, Ola Andersson, Lajos Székely and Carl Lesche, has a chapter devoted to them. In 2003, Johansson published Freuds psykoanalys. Band 3. Arvtagare i Sverige. Del 2 (Freud's Psychoanalysis. Vol 3. Heirs in Sweden Part 2). In this volume, Alfhild Tamm, Gunnar Nycander, Gösta Harding and Stefi Pedersen, likewise are given their own chapters.

Having thus described the reception of Freud and psychoanalysis from a Swedish perspective, Johansson devoted a fourth volume (2009) to the situation of psychiatry and clinical psychology in Gothenburg.

Together with the French psychoanalyst and historian Elisabeth Roudinesco, Johansson has introduced the Swedish psychoanalyst and researcher Ola Andersson in France. He has also critically read and introduced the Swedish translations of several texts by Sigmund Freud and Michel Foucault.

Psychoanalysis and the Humanities, a collection of essays, was published in 2014. Here, Johansson deals with the complex encounter between psychoanalysis and the humanities, elucidating the subject from a number of various perspectives, cultural, historical, theoretical, practical, and clinical as well as personal.

The book Arkitektliv. Gert Wingårdh i samtal med Per Magnus Johansson och Johan Linton [Life of an Architect. Gert Wingårdh in conversation with Per Magnus Johansson and Johan Linton] was published in October 2021.

During the COVID-19 pandemic Johansson published Corona. En psykoanalytikers dagbok (Corona. A Psychoanalysts Notebook) in three volumes. The texts were published in a single volume in 2023: Corona. En psykoanalytikers dagbok 1-3.

Johansson contributes to the debate on contemporary issues through articles in the major Swedish newspapers and by participating in cultural events, podcasts and lectures. Johansson is a regular columnist in Göteborgs-Posten.

In April 2026, Johansson published the book Om skrivande [On writing] at Fri tanke.

== The Freudian Association in Gothenburg ==
In his hometown Gothenburg, Johansson has founded Freudianska föreningen (The Freudian Association), which arranges seminars and lectures. Johansson is founder, editor in chief, and publisher of Arche – a journal with an interest in psychoanalysis, the humanities, and architecture (previously Psykoanalytisk Tid/Skrift). In the journal, Johansson has published interviews with several French psychoanalysts, such as René Major, Elisabeth Roudinesco, Julia Kristeva, Roland Gori, Charles Melman, and Catherine Millot. Arche was in 2018 awarded the prize as cultural magazine of the year in Sweden.

== Awards and honorary memberships ==
In 2006, Johansson was awarded the distinction Ordre des Palmes Académiques by the French Ministry of Education. On 26 March 2012, Johansson was elected honorary member of the Swedish Psychoanalytical Association, a constituent organization of the International Psychoanalytical Association. The honorary membership was cancelled in March 2025. In 2014, Johansson was elected member of the Royal Society of Arts and Sciences in Gothenburg. In April 2024, Johansson was awarded the City of Gothenburg's work grant for writers.

== Sources and further reading ==
https://permagnusjohansson.com/cv-per-magnus-johansson/
