= 1950–51 Allsvenskan =

27th season of Allsvenskan

Allsvenskan
- Season: 1950–51
- Champions: Malmö FF
- Relegated: AIK; Kalmar FF
- Top goalscorer: Hasse Jeppson, Djurgårdens IF (17)
- Average attendance: 10,501

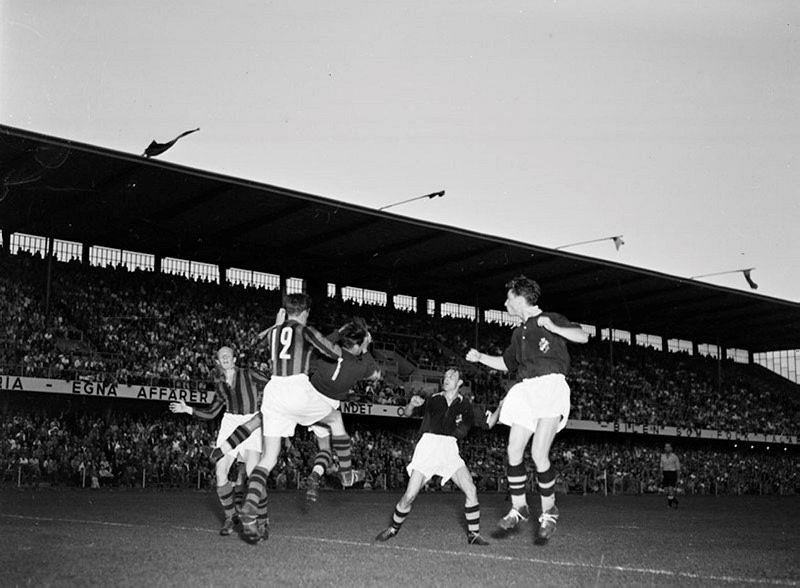
Football match between AIK and Djurgården. 1950

Statistics of Allsvenskan in season 1950/1951.

== Overview ==
The league was contested by 12 teams, with Malmö FF winning the championship.

== League table ==
Pos	Team	Pld	W	D	L	GF	GA	GD	Pts	Qualification or relegation
1	Malmö FF (C)	22	16	5	1	52	22	+30	37	
2	Råå	22	12	4	6	44	27	+17	28	
3	Degerfors IF	22	10	7	5	34	23	+11	27	
4	Hälsingborgs IF	22	11	3	8	43	29	+14	25	
5	IFK Norrköping	22	11	3	8	38	29	+9	25	
6	Djurgårdens IF	22	9	5	8	42	37	+5	23	
7	GAIS	22	8	3	11	33	40	−7	19	
8	Örebro SK	22	7	4	11	32	45	−13	18	
9	Jönköpings Södra IF	22	7	4	11	37	54	−17	18	
10	IF Elfsborg	22	6	5	11	31	41	−10	17	
11	AIK (R)	22	6	5	11	27	37	−10	17	Relegation to Division 2
12	Kalmar FF (R)	22	2	6	14	25	54	−29	10	Relegation to Division 2

Rules for classification: 1) points; 2) goal difference; 3) number of goals scored.
(C) Champions; (R) Relegated

== Results ==
Home \ Away	AIK	DEG	DJU	GAIS	HIF	IFE	IFK	JS	KFF	MFF	RIF	ÖSK
AIK		1–1	1–1	1–4	1–1	4–0	1–3	3–1	1–0	1–0	1–2	1–3
Degerfors IF	0–1		2–0	5–1	1–0	1–1	0–0	3–0	1–1	1–1	1–3	3–2
Djurgårdens IF	2–1	2–2		5–1	3–0	2–2	2–1	2–1	2–2	2–3	0–2	5–1
GAIS	1–0	1–1	2–1		0–1	2–1	2–1	5–0	4–1	1–1	0–2	1–1
Hälsingborgs IF	3–1	0–1	3–0	1–3		3–1	1–2	5–0	2–1	1–3	1–1	4–0
IF Elfsborg	1–3	0–4	4–2	2–0	1–1		0–3	0–2	5–1	1–2	2–2	0–2
IFK Norrköping	2–1	1–2	1–1	1–0	1–3	0–3		3–1	7–1	0–2	3–1	2–1
Jönköpings Södra	4–1	5–2	0–1	4–3	1–2	1–0	1–1		3–2	4–4	2–2	2–1
Kalmar FF	1–1	0–1	0–1	4–1	2–6	1–2	0–4	1–1		0–0	2–6	2–2
Malmö FF	3–1	1–0	3–1	1–0	3–1	2–1	3–0	7–3	2–1		3–1	2–1
Råå IF	3–0	1–2	2–0	3–0	1–3	2–3	2–0	4–0	2–1	0–0		1–0
Örebro SK	1–1	1–0	3–7	3–1	2–1	1–1	1–2	2–1	0–1	1–6	3–1	

Legend: Blue = home team win; Yellow = draw; Red = away team win.

== Attendances ==
#	Club	Average	Highest
1	Djurgårdens IF	18,902	36,959
2	Malmö FF	17,013	20,781
3	AIK	16,842	23,300
4	GAIS	12,630	19,148
5	Råå IF	10,893	23,604
6	Hälsingborgs IF	9,846	17,569
7	Örebro SK	8,228	11,253
8	IF Elfsborg	7,326	11,587
9	IFK Norrköping	6,918	15,160
10	Jönköpings Södra IF	6,548	7,812
11	Kalmar FF	6,430	10,516
12	Degerfors IF	4,495	8,358
