= Mika Johansson =

Finnish footballer (born 1984)

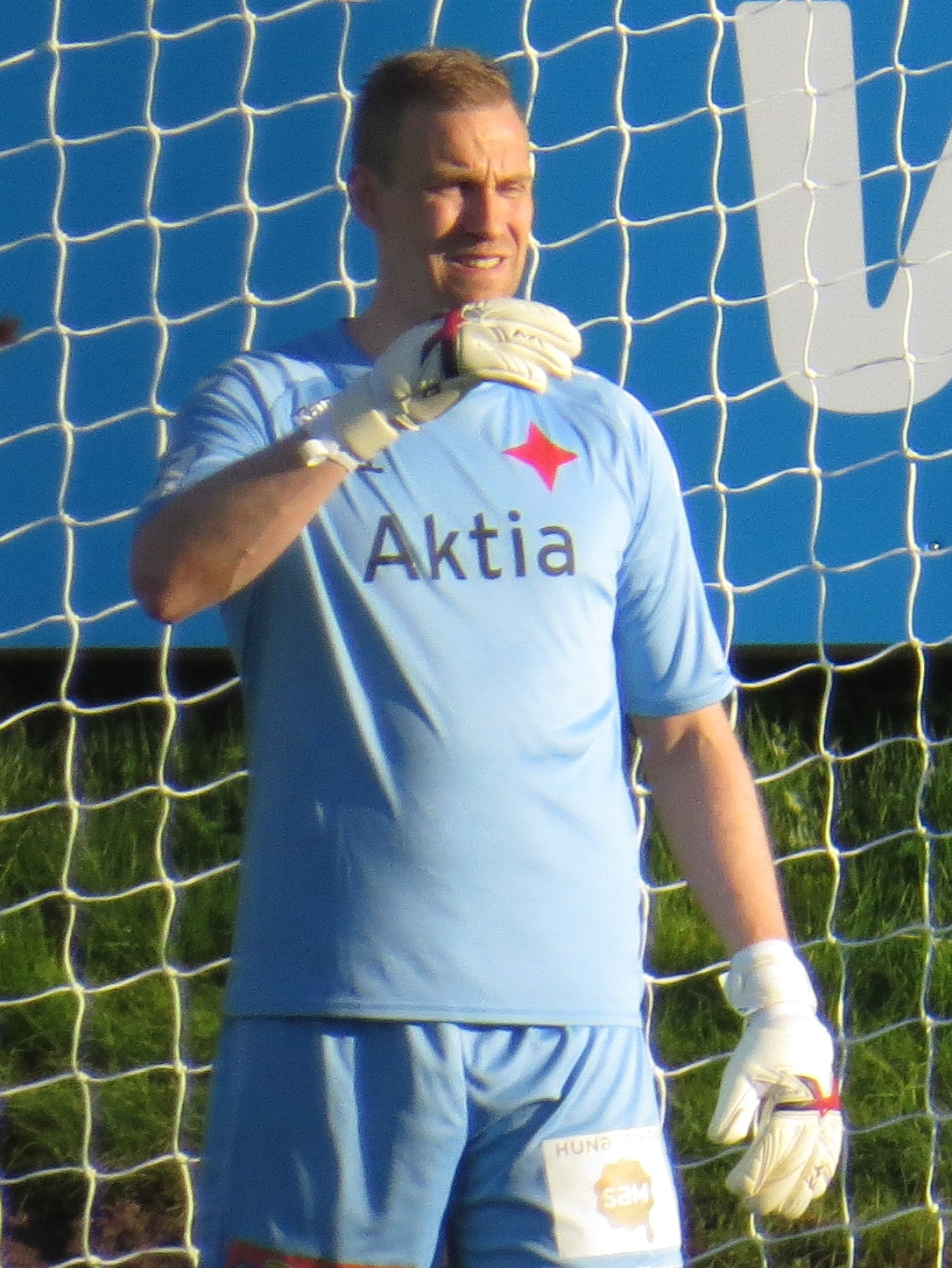
- Mika Johansson playing for HIFK in 2015

Personal information
- Date of birth: 13 March 1984 (age 42)
- Place of birth: Kirkkonummi, Finland
- Height: 1.92 m (6 ft 3 1/2 in)
- Position: Goalkeeper

Team information
- Current team: FC Honka
- Number: 1

Senior career*
Years	Team	Apps	(Gls)
2003	FC Jokerit	1	(0)
2007	HJK Helsinki	3	(0)
2008	Atlantis FC	21	(0)
2009–2011	MyPa	25	(0)
2012	HIFK	24	(0)
2013–2014	FC Viikingit	25	(0)
2014–2016	HIFK	15	(0)
2016–	FC Honka	0	(0)
- * Club domestic league appearances and goals as of 26 June 2015

Mika Johansson (born 13 March 1984) is a Finnish footballer who currently plays for FC Honka in Finnish Kakkonen.
