= Per-Johan Johansson =

Swedish ice hockey player (born 1968)

- Born: March 31, 1968 (age 58) Sweden
- Position: Forward
- Played for: Brynäs IF
- NHL draft: Undrafted
- Playing career: 1991–1996

Per-Johan Johansson (born March 31, 1968) is a Swedish former professional ice hockey player.

Between 1992 and 1996, Johansson played 120 regular season games in the Swedish Elitserien with Brynäs IF.

== Family ==
His son, Jonas (born September 19, 1995) is a goaltender within the Brynäs IF organization. Jonas won a silver medal with Team Sweden at the 2014 World Junior Ice Hockey Championships.
