= Rosa Lie Johansson =

Swedish-Mexican painter

Rosa Lie Johansson (9 February 1922 – 2004) was a Swedish-Mexican painter whose work was recognized with membership in the Salón de la Plástica Mexicana.

== Life ==
Rosa Lie Johansson was born in Askum, Sweden. She first studied painting in Gothenburg in the 1940s with government support. In 1952, she continued her art studies at the Academie Belle Arti under Ferruccio Ferrazzi, an Italian painter and sculptor.

Johansson spent much of her life traveling. In 1951, she moved to Italy and traveled in the region until late in 1952, when she moved to New York. There she joined the Art Students League, collaborating with Will Barnet, known for his graphic work and mural collaboration with José Clemente Orozco.

After her time in New York she moved to Mexico, first living in San Miguel Allende, traveling around states such as Guanajuato and Michoacán to study the architecture and culture of central Mexico. During this, economic policy in Mexico allowed Swedish businesspeople to invest in Mexico. A small Swedish community formed in the Colonia Anzures neighborhood of Mexico City. Johansson moved here to find economic and moral support, moving to Mexico's capital, but living alone in her own apartment, with only the company of her cat, Cassandra. She continued to travel in Mexico for much of her life, often in the company of her close friend Alma Reed. She also toured Indonesia in 1969, attracted by its color and mysticism.

Johansson eventually identified as Mexican, dressing in Mexican traditional garb, with a particular affinity for Mayan culture, past and present.

== Career ==
Her first major collective exhibition was also government-sponsored in 1949 at the Konsthalen. During her career, Johansson had over 200 exhibitions of her work in museums and galleries Mexico, Sweden, Italy, India, Indonesia and Colombia, in cities such as Delhi, Washington D.C., New York and Bogotá. Her more important venues includes the Museo de Arte Moderno, the Palacio de Bellas Artes (1958) and the Museo Nacional in Bogotá, Colombia (1968). She exhibited in various parts of Mexico, in venues such as the Juarez Museum of Art in 1976, and represented Sweden at the Selected Works of World Art exhibit at the Museo de Arte Moderno, part of the 1968 Olympics. Her last exhibition while alive was called Acuario, held at the Salón de la Plástica Mexicana in 2001.

She was inducted into the Salón de la Plástica Mexicana in 1962, with the individual exhibition called Vista de Estudio.

== Artistry ==
Johansson was noted for her careful preparatory work, planning the composition of her paintings, both of elements and of spaces, through drawing and other techniques. Her works are primarily in oils on canvas with some in gouache and ink on amate paper and commercial paper, in medium and large formats. However, she did create small-scale works on amate paper, usually as gifts.

Her images are figurative with influences from the Expressionist and Cubist movements, although elements of abstract art appear. The New York Times described her work as “… subtly primitive with reminiscences of Gaugin and the flavor of Nordic motifs.” Her images are often drawn from mythological and metaphysical allegory along with urban landscapes. Details from Mexico’s pre Hispanic and colonial past also appear, becoming relatively dominant but traces of Nordic designs can still be found. After a trip to Indonesia, elements from this culture also appeared in her works. Her later works incorporated warmer colors, such as yellow and red.
