= Pär Johansson =

Swedish screenwriter (born 1970)

- Born: Pär Ingemar Johansson; 6 March 1970; Skön

See also Per Johansson (disambiguation).

Pär Ingemar Johansson (born 6 March 1970 in Sundsvall (grew up in Delsbo)) is a Swedish screenwriter, lecturer, theatre producer and theatre director. He works in Hudiksvall. He started the theatrical organization Glada Hudik-teatern in 1996. In 2011 he received H. M. The King's Medal.
