= Sebastian Johansson (American football) =

Swedish-born American football player (born 1991)

Profile
- Position: Offensive lineman

Personal information
- Born: April 22, 1991 (age 35); Karlstad, Sweden
- Listed height: 6 ft 5 in (1.96 m)
- Listed weight: 284 lb (129 kg)

Career information
- High school: Raceland High School, KY
- College: Marshall
- NFL draft: 2016: undrafted

Career history
- San Diego Chargers (2016)*
- * Offseason or practice squad member only

Sebastian Johansson (born April 22, 1991) is a Swedish-born American football offensive lineman . He played college football at Marshall University.

== Early life ==
Johansson played club football for the Carlstad Crusaders in his native Sweden before attending high school in Raceland, Kentucky, where he played for one season. He committed to Marshall University to play college football.

== College career ==
Johansson was a three-year starter for Marshall University from 2013 to 2015. He committed to Marshall in 2011, but didn't play until 2013 as he spent the first two years adapting to major college football offensive line play.

== Professional career ==
In the 2016 draft, Johansson went undrafted but was later signed by the San Diego Chargers. On May 16, the Chargers released Johansson.
