= 1951–52 Allsvenskan =

28th season of Allsvenskan

Allsvenskan
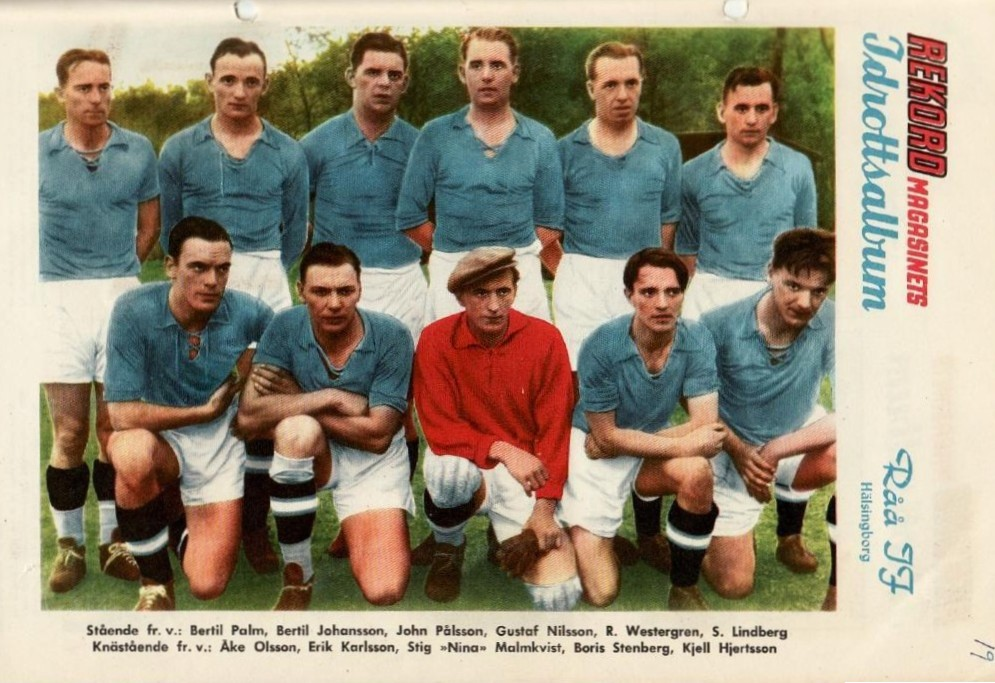
- Råå IF in 1951
- Season: 1951–52
- Champions: IFK Norrköping
- Relegated: Råå IF; Åtvidabergs FF
- Top goalscorer: Karl-Alfred Jacobsson, GAIS (17)
- Average attendance: 9,933

These are the statistics for the 1951–52 season of Allsvenskan, the highest tier of the Swedish football league system.

== Overview ==
The league was contested by 12 teams, with IFK Norrköping winning the championship.

== League table ==
| Pos | Team | Pld | W | D | L | GF | GA | GD | Pts | Qualification or relegation |
|---|---|---|---|---|---|---|---|---|---|---|
| 1 | IFK Norrköping (C) | 22 | 15 | 5 | 2 | 50 | 21 | +29 | 35 | |
| 2 | Malmö FF | 22 | 15 | 2 | 5 | 50 | 17 | +33 | 32 | |
| 3 | Hälsingborgs IF | 22 | 11 | 4 | 7 | 40 | 24 | +16 | 26 | |
| 4 | IFK Göteborg | 22 | 10 | 5 | 7 | 46 | 37 | +9 | 25 | |
| 5 | GAIS | 22 | 9 | 6 | 7 | 41 | 34 | +7 | 24 | |
| 6 | Degerfors IF | 22 | 9 | 5 | 8 | 36 | 29 | +7 | 23 | |
| 7 | Djurgårdens IF | 22 | 10 | 3 | 9 | 39 | 42 | −3 | 23 | |
| 8 | Örebro SK | 22 | 9 | 5 | 8 | 40 | 45 | −5 | 23 | |
| 9 | Jönköpings Södra IF | 22 | 7 | 3 | 12 | 34 | 40 | −6 | 17 | |
| 10 | IF Elfsborg | 22 | 4 | 6 | 12 | 27 | 47 | −20 | 14 | |
| 11 | Råå (R) | 22 | 4 | 4 | 14 | 22 | 58 | −36 | 12 | Relegation to Division 2 |
| 12 | Åtvidabergs FF (R) | 22 | 1 | 8 | 13 | 21 | 52 | −31 | 10 | Relegation to Division 2 |

Rules for classification: 1) points; 2) goal difference; 3) number of goals scored.
(C) Champions; (R) Relegated

== Results ==
| Home \ Away | DEG | DJU | GAIS | HIF | IFE | IFKG | IFKN | JS | MFF | RIF | ÅFF | ÖSK |
|---|---|---|---|---|---|---|---|---|---|---|---|---|
| Degerfors IF | | 4–2 | 0–1 | 0–0 | 1–0 | 0–2 | 1–0 | 3–2 | 0–2 | 6–1 | 5–1 | 3–0 |
| Djurgårdens IF | 2–1 | | 4–3 | 0–1 | 2–0 | 0–1 | 0–3 | 1–1 | 6–2 | 1–1 | 2–2 | 1–2 |
| GAIS | 1–1 | 1–3 | | 1–2 | 4–1 | 2–2 | 1–4 | 4–1 | 1–0 | 5–1 | 1–1 | 2–2 |
| Hälsingborgs IF | 1–0 | 1–2 | 2–1 | | 1–3 | 5–0 | 0–1 | 1–0 | 1–0 | 4–1 | 5–0 | 1–2 |
| IF Elfsborg | 1–1 | 2–1 | 1–3 | 3–3 | | 2–1 | 1–3 | 2–4 | 0–2 | 2–0 | 0–0 | 2–5 |
| IFK Göteborg | 2–4 | 3–4 | 0–0 | 1–1 | 2–2 | | 0–1 | 2–1 | 2–1 | 2–0 | 4–1 | 8–1 |
| IFK Norrköping | 3–1 | 4–2 | 2–0 | 2–2 | 2–1 | 2–2 | | 3–0 | 2–1 | 4–0 | 3–0 | 2–2 |
| Jönköpings Södra | 2–2 | 0–1 | 1–3 | 2–1 | 3–0 | 1–4 | 1–2 | | 0–1 | 2–0 | 4–0 | 1–1 |
| Malmö FF | 2–0 | 6–1 | 3–0 | 2–0 | 4–0 | 2–1 | 1–1 | 4–0 | | 5–0 | 2–0 | 1–0 |
| Råå IF | 2–0 | 0–2 | 1–1 | 0–4 | 1–1 | 2–4 | 3–2 | 1–3 | 0–2 | | 1–0 | 3–6 |
| Åtvidabergs FF | 1–1 | 1–2 | 2–3 | 1–4 | 2–2 | 1–3 | 1–3 | 2–1 | 1–1 | 2–2 | | 2–3 |
| Örebro SK | 1–2 | 3–0 | 0–3 | 2–0 | 2–1 | 4–0 | 1–1 | 2–4 | 1–6 | 0–2 | 0–0 | |

Legend: Blue = home team win; Yellow = draw; Red = away team win.

== Attendances ==
| # | Club | Average attendance | Highest attendance |
|---|---|---|---|
| 1 | IFK Göteborg | 17,584 | 29,886 |
| 2 | Djurgårdens IF | 16,319 | 30,444 |
| 3 | Malmö FF | 14,333 | 20,779 |
| 4 | GAIS | 13,962 | 21,188 |
| 5 | IFK Norrköping | 10,033 | 21,625 |
| 6 | Hälsingborgs IF | 9,508 | 19,443 |
| 7 | Örebro SK | 8,697 | 15,951 |
| 8 | Råå IF | 7,653 | 14,598 |
| 9 | IF Elfsborg | 6,783 | 11,912 |
| 10 | Jönköpings Södra IF | 6,725 | 11,689 |
| 11 | Degerfors IF | 4,424 | 7,835 |
| 12 | Åtvidabergs FF | 3,212 | 5,673 |
