= Ann-Sofie Johansson =

Swedish fashion designer

- Education: University of Gothenburg, Lund University, Anders Beckman's School
- Occupation: Fashion designer
- Known for: Head of Design for H&M (2008–2013)
- Title: Creative Advisor, H&M

Ann-Sofie Johansson is a Swedish fashion designer, known for being the Creative Advisor and former Head of Design for retailer H&M.

== Early life and education ==
Johansson grew up in Ronneby, an hour away from Stockholm, Sweden. As a youth, she shopped often at H&M, calling it the "heaven of fashion".

After first thinking about becoming a veterinarian, Johansson instead pursued art science studies and archaeology at Gothenburg and Lund universities – it was then that she realized she wanted a career involving artistic creativity. She took some evening courses in design at the Anders Beckman's School in Stockholm.

== Career at H&M ==
In 1987, after deciding she wanted to become a fashion designer, Johansson took a job as sales assistant at H&M. Three years later, she showed her portfolio to company head of design Margareta van den Bosch and was given H&M's new position of design assistant. From 1994 to 2005, Johansson worked as a designer for the Young department at H&M, before moving to the Ladies' department. In 2008, Johansson was promoted to Head of Design, working with 140 designers, and in 2013 she began overseeing H&M's special collections shown in Paris.

Johansson became Creative Advisor in 2015, and has subsequently worked as H&M's spokesperson and representative. Her job involves travel, fashion research, designer collaborations, and the overseeing of H&M's "brand building" collections.
