= Hans Johansen =

Danish-Russian zoologist

Hans Christian Johansen
- Born: 21 november\3 december 1897; Riga, Governorate of Livonia, Russian Empire
- Died: 18 December 1973 (aged 76); Hjortekær Copenhagen, Denmark
- Education: Ritter und Domschule zu Reval (diploma 1916); Tomsk University (no degree); Ludwig-Maximilians-Universität München (diploma 1924)
- Scientific career
- Fields: Zoology, Zoogeography, Ornithology
- Workplaces: Tomsk University, Herder-Institut Riga, University of Copenhagen,
- Academic advisors: Hermann Eduardovich Johansen
- Notable students: Vasily Nikolaevitch Skalon, Alexander Jakovlevitch Janushevitch, Igor Aleksandrovitch Dolgushin

Hans Christian Johansen (2 December 1897–18 December 1973) was a Danish-Russian professor of zoology, first at Tomsk State University, later at the University of Copenhagen.

== Life ==
Hans Johansen was born in Riga, Governorate of Livonia, Russian Empire (Latvia nowadays) to Danish parents. He went to Knight and Cathedral school to Reval in Reval (Tallinn). As a young research-eager student, he came to Tomsk in spring 1916 to study natural history. He met the Russian ornithologist Hermann Johansen, with whom he had no blood-relationship (in Russian their names are written differently). They went on a bird-collection expedition to the southern border of the taiga between the rivers Om and Ob. In 1917, Hans Johansen investigated the Baraba steppe alone. The Russian Revolution and subsequent Civil War cut him off from his home and his finances. During 1918–1919, he travelled by foot, and with much suffering and adventure, through the Altai Mountains for nearly two years. In Altai, he first married A.T. Yalbacheva. He made a collection of some 500 bird specimens. During the summer of 1920, he investigated the Biysk steppe and spent the winter of 1920/1921 in Tomsk.

From May 1921, he undertook doctoral studies at the Ludwig-Maximilians-Universität München and took his PhD in zoogeography in 1924. He subsequently returned to Tomsk and worked from 1925 as an assistant to Hermann Johansen. He made expedition to Ussuri in 1926 and the taiga of the Narym Basin in 1927. Hans Johansen moved to Kamchatka in 1928, and shortly thereafter settled on the Commander Islands as a scientific leader of fur animal exploitation there. He stayed there for 3½ years.

Professor Hermann Johansen died in 1930 and, after a while, Hans Johansen was appointed his successor as professor of zoology in Tomsk. He succeeded in building a small group of ornithology students, who were sent off to investigate the bird fauna of hitherto unexplored areas of Western Siberia. Johansen visited the Salair area in 1934 and the Kuznetsk Alatau in the spring of 1937. His collection of Siberian bird specimens had then grown to some 4500. This was mainly achieved through efforts by himself and his students, but also by purchase of the collections of Hermann Johansen and others. During his years as a professor in Tomsk, Hans Johansen made frequent study visits to the bird collections of the Russian Academy of Sciences in St Petersburg.

In October 1937, Johansen was expelled from the Soviet Union like all foreign citizens. He came to Estonia where was unemployed, later worked at the Herder Institut, Latvia, and in the Germany. In May 1944 he moved from Germany to Denmark. His mother, daughter and older sister had moved to Denmark earlier. Here he was employed at the Zoological Museum of the University of Copenhagen and headed its bird ringing centre 1943–1960.

Later he actively studied birds of the whole world, visited North and South America, East Africa, and South Asia. He repeatedly visited the USSR, where he participated in conferences and provided communication for Russian and European ornithologists. In this he was helped by the knowledge of Russian, German, Danish. At the same time, he read and translated from Latin, Swedish, French and Polish. Could read or explain in English, Norwegian, Estonian, Altai and Aleut.

At the end of his life he bought a cottage on the isle of Læsø, the barren landscape of which reminded him of Siberia. He later donated this house to the University of Copenhagen. A field laboratory was made out of it. He also donated part of his library to Tomsk State University.

Hans Johansen wrote a full treatise of the bird fauna of Western Siberia published in a suite of papers from 1943 to 1961, Die Vogelfauna Westsibiriens in Journal für Ornithologie (now Journal of Ornithology) vol. 91 - 102.

== Selected scientific works ==
- Johansen, Hans (1922) Zur geographischen Verbreitung einiger Vögel in Westsibirien. Verh. ornith. Ges. Bayern, 15 (2).
- Johansen, Hans (1922) Dryobates m. major und Dryobates m. brevirostris. Verh. ornith. Ges. Bayern, 15 (2).
- Johansen, Hans (1924) Russische ornithologische Arbeit während der letzten Jahre. Journal für Ornithologie 72 (1): 68-73.
- Johansen, Hans (1935) The breeding birds of the Salair mountains. Trudy biol. Inst. Tomsk. Univ. Vol. 1. (In Russian).
- Johansen, Hans (1936) The geographical variability of Turdus pilaris. Animadversiones systematicae Mus. Zool. Tomsk. Univ. Nr. 5. (In Russian).
- Johansen, Hans (1943) Die Vogelfauna Westsibiriens - Einleitung. Journal für Ornithologie 91 (1): 9-13.
- Johansen, Hans (1943) Die Vogelfauna Westsibiriens - Geographische Uebersicht. Journal für Ornithologie 91 (1): 15-27.
- Johansen, Hans (1943) Die Vogelfauna Westsibiriens - Die wichtigsten phänologischen Erscheinungen. Journal für Ornithologie 91 (1): 27-33.
- Johansen, Hans (1943) Die Vogelfauna Westsibiriens - Die Lebensstätten der westsibirischen Vogelwelt. Journal für Ornithologie 91 (1): 33-56.
- Johansen, Hans (1943) Die Vogelfauna Westsibiriens - Die Randgebiete. Journal für Ornithologie 91 (1): 56-72.
- Johansen, Hans (1943) Die Vogelfauna Westsibiriens - Ornithologische Erforschungsgeschichte. Journal für Ornithologie 91 (1): 73-92.
- Johansen, Hans (1943) Die Vogelfauna Westsibiriens - Literaturverzeichnis zu Teil I und II. Journal für Ornithologie 91 (1): 93-.
- Johansen, Hans (1944) Die Vogelfauna Westsibiriens - II. Teil. Systematik und Verbreitung, Oekologie und Biologie der Einzelarten. Journal für Ornithologie 92 (1-2)
- Johansen, Hans (1944) Die Vogelfauna Westsibiriens. Journal für Ornithologie 92 (3-4)
- Johansen, Hans (1954) Die Vogelfauna Westsibiriens - II. Teil (Systematik und Verbreitung, Oekologie und Biologie der Einzelarten). Journal für Ornithologie 95 (3-4)
- Johansen, Hans (1954) Die Vogelfauna Westsibiriens - II. Teil (Systematik und Verbreitung, Oekologie und Biologie der Einzelarten) 2. Fortsetzung:Muscicapidae — Sylviidae. Journal für Ornithologie 95 (1-2)
- Johansen, Hans (1955) Die Vogelfauna Westsibiriens - II. Teil (Systematik und Verbreitung, Oekologie und Biologie der Einzelarten) 4. Fortsetzung:Erithacidae—Hirundinidae.Journal für Ornithologie 96 (1)
- Johansen, Hans (1955) Die Vogelfauna Westsibiriens - III. Teil Systematik und Verbreitung, Oekologie und Lebensweise der Non-Passeres. Journal für Ornithologie 96 (4)
- Johansen, Hans (1956) Die Vogelfauna Westsibiriens. Journal für Ornithologie 97 (2)
- Johansen, Hans (1957) Die Vogelfauna Westsibiriens. Journal für Ornithologie 98 (2)
- Johansen, Hans (1957) Die Vogelfauna Westsibiriens. Journal für Ornithologie 98 (3)
- Johansen, Hans (1957) Die Vogelfauna Westsibiriens. Journal für Ornithologie 98 (4)
- Johansen, Hans (1958) Die Vogelfauna Westsibiriens. Journal für Ornithologie 99 (1)
- Johansen, Hans (1959) Die Vogelfauna Westsibiriens. Journal für Ornithologie 100 (1)
- Johansen, Hans (1959) Die Vogelfauna Westsibiriens. Journal für Ornithologie 100 (3)
- Johansen, Hans (1959) Die Vogelfauna Westsibiriens. Journal für Ornithologie 100 (4)
- Johansen, Hans (1960) Die Vogelfauna Westsibiriens. Journal für Ornithologie 101 (3)
- Johansen, Hans (1960) Die Vogelfauna Westsibiriens. Journal für Ornithologie 101 (4)
- Johansen, Hans (1961) Die Vogelfauna Westsibiriens - III. Teil (Non-Passeres) 11. Fortsetzung: Limicolae II (Tringa bis Haematopus). Journal für Ornithologie 102 (1)
- Johansen, Hans (1961) Die Vogelfauna Westsibiriens. Journal für Ornithologie 102 (3)
- Johansen, Hans (1961) Die Vogelfauna Westsibiriens. Journal für Ornithologie 102 (3)
- Johansen, Hans (1961) Die Entstehung der westsibirischen Vogelfauna. Journal für Ornithologie 102 (4)
