= Katrina Johansson =

- Born: Milwaukee, Wisconsin, USA
- Genres: Heavy metal, instrumental rock, progressive metal
- Occupation(s): Musician, songwriter, producer
- Instrument: Guitar
- Years active: 2005–present
- Labels: M.A.C.E.
- Website: www.katrinaguitar.com

Katrina Johansson is an American guitarist from Milwaukee, Wisconsin. She released her debut extended play, Guitarsongs Volume 1, in 2005, which was notable for featuring fellow shred guitarist Michael Angelo Batio on bass. In 2007 a second EP was released, entitled Love, Surrender, Forgiveness which was produced by Mike Hoffmann.

Her father encouraged her to play sports or music as a child and she chose guitar at age 9 or 10. In her teens she trained in classical guitar before switching to rock, taking lessons for 5-6 years. She studied classical and rock guitar at the Wisconsin Conservatory. After graduation she joined regional bands and took lessons in Los Angeles from Gary Hoey and Michael Angelo Batio.

Johansson noted that being a woman in a shred metal world can be challenging as women can be judged first by their looks and not their musical ability. She has said she sounds like Joe Satriani but has also been noted to sound like Eric Johnson. She also cites guitarists Gary Moore, Yngwie Malmsteen, Jimi Hendrix, Ritchie Blackmore as influences, and Opeth, Van Halen and Soundgarden as some of her favorite bands. Other personal interests she identifies include kickboxing, rollerblading and mountain biking.

== Discography ==
- Guitarsongs Volume 1 (2005)
- Love, Surrender, Forgiveness (2007)
