= Jonas Johansson (ice hockey, born 1982) =

Swedish ice hockey player

- Born: March 29, 1982 (age 43) Luleå, Sweden
- Height: 6 ft 1 in (185 cm)
- Weight: 180 lb (82 kg; 12 st 12 lb)
- Position: Defence
- Shot: Right
- Played for: Elitserien; Luleå HF
- NHL draft: Undrafted
- Playing career: 2001–2007

Jonas Johansson (born March 29, 1982) is a Swedish former professional ice hockey defenceman.

Between 2001 and 2006, Johansson played in the Swedish Elitserien with Luleå HF.

== Career statistics ==
			Regular season					Playoffs
Season	Team	League	GP	G	A	Pts	PIM	GP	G	A	Pts	PIM
1999–00	Luleå HF J18	J18 Allsvenskan	9	1	0	1	16	—	—	—	—	—
2000–01	Luleå HF J20	J20 SuperElit	19	0	1	1	22	3	0	0	0	29
2001–02	Luleå HF J20	J20 SuperElit	24	5	12	17	36	2	0	0	0	2
2001–02	Luleå HF	Elitserien	34	0	0	0	0	6	0	0	0	0
2002–03	Luleå HF	Elitserien	4	0	0	0	2	—	—	—	—	—
2002–03	Piteå HC	Allsvenskan	42	0	8	8	26	—	—	—	—	—
2003–04	Luleå HF	Elitserien	44	1	5	6	28	1	0	0	0	0
2004–05	Luleå HF J20	J20 SuperElit	15	1	4	5	8	—	—	—	—	—
2004–05	Luleå HF	Elitserien	29	0	0	0	16	2	0	0	0	0
2004–05	Piteå HC	Allsvenskan	5	0	1	1	14	—	—	—	—	—
2005–06	Luleå HF J20	J20 SuperElit	4	0	0	0	4	—	—	—	—	—
2005–06	Luleå HF	Elitserien	10	0	0	0	0	—	—	—	—	—
2005–06	Almtuna IS	HockeyAllsvenskan	14	0	2	2	4	—	—	—	—	—
2005–06	Piteå HC	Division 1	16	3	8	11	10	7	0	0	0	4
2006–07	Mörrums GoIS IK	Division 1	18	1	0	1	16	—	—	—	—	—
Elitserien totals			121	1	5	6	46	9	0	0	0	0
Allsvenskan totals			47	0	9	9	40	—	—	—	—	—
