= Anders Johansen =

Norwegian politician

Anders Johansen (28 March 1929 - 23 December 2015) was a Norwegian politician for the Labour Party.

He served as a deputy representative to the Parliament of Norway from Vestfold during the terms 1969–1973 and 1973–1977. In total he met during 2 days of parliamentary session. He worked as a superintendent in Stokke.
