= Last Kiss (disambiguation) =

"Last Kiss" is a 1961 love song by Wayne Cochran, covered by J. Frank Wilson and the Cavaliers, Wednesday, Pearl Jam, and others.

Last Kiss or The Last Kiss may also refer to:

== Film ==
- The Last Kiss (1931 film), a British Indian silent film
- The Last Kiss (2001 film) or L'ultimo bacio, an Italian romantic comedy-drama
- The Last Kiss (2006 film), an American remake by Tony Goldwyn
- The Last Kiss (2026 film), an American slasher

== Music ==
- "Last Kiss", a 1961 song by Wayne Cochran
- The Last Kiss (album), a 2009 album by Jadakiss
- "Last Kiss" (Bonnie Pink song), 2004
- "Last Kiss" (Tanpopo song), 1998
- "Last Kiss", a 2009 song by Joe Bonamassa from The Ballad of John Henry
- "Last Kiss", a 2010 song by Taylor Swift from Speak Now
- "The Last Kiss", a 1999 song by AFI from Black Sails in the Sunset
- "The Last Kiss", a 1985 song by David Cassidy from Romance

== Other uses ==
- The Kiss of Death (photograph), also known as The Last Kiss
- "Last Kiss", a comic strip by John Lustig

== See also ==
- The Kaiser's Last Kiss, a 2003 novel by Alan Judd
- One Last Kiss (disambiguation)
