= Sofie Johansson =

Swedish orienteering competitor

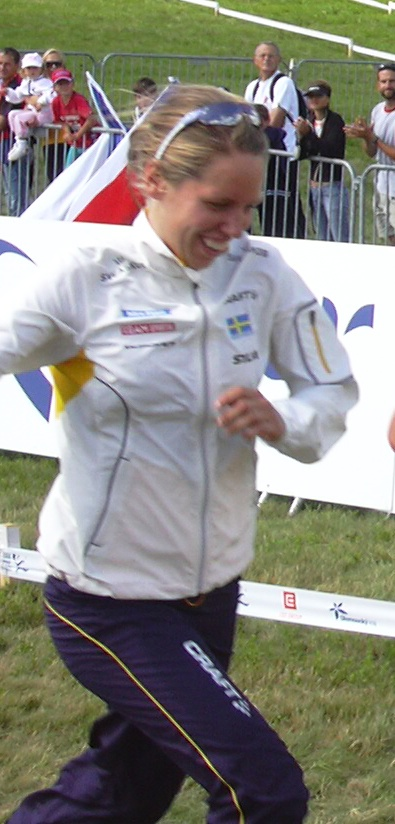
- Johansson at WOC 2008

Medal record

Women's orienteering

Representing Sweden

World Championships
Bronze medal – third place	2008 Olomouc	Relay

Sofie Johansson (born 1 July 1985) is a Swedish orienteering competitor. She won a bronze medal in the relay event at the 2008 World Orienteering Championships in Olomouc, together with Annika Billstam and Helena Jansson. She finished 6th in the long distance at the same championship.
