= Jon Johansson =

New Zealand political scientist (born 1961)

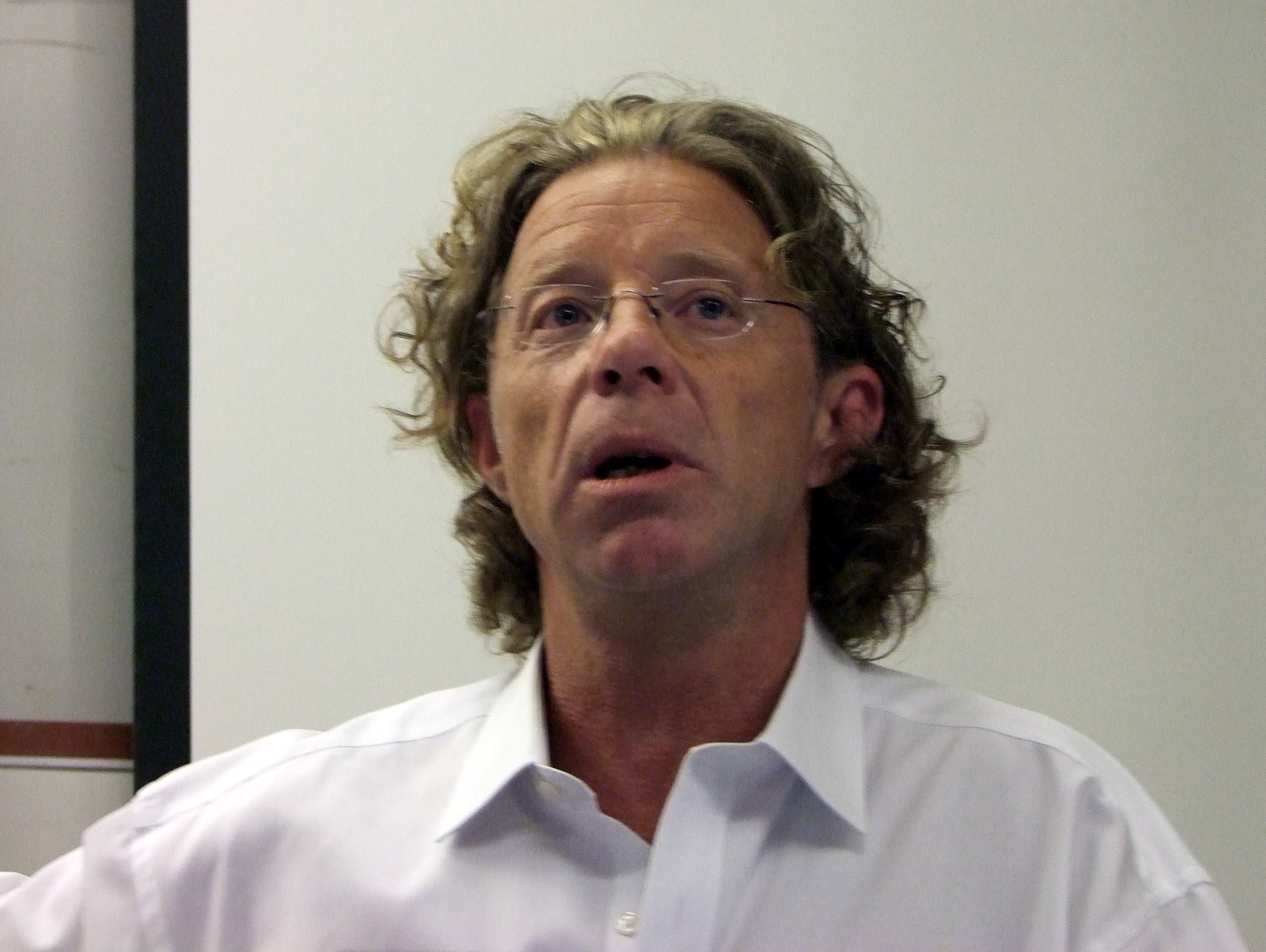
- Johansson in 2011
- Born: 1961 (age 64–65)

Academic background
- Education: Victoria University of Wellington
- Thesis: Political leadership in New Zealand: theory & practice (2002)

Academic work
- Discipline: Political science
- Institutions: Victoria University of Wellington

Jon Johansson (born 1961) is a New Zealand political scientist and the former chief of staff for New Zealand First. His academic specialties are New Zealand and American politics, as well as political leadership. He lectured these subjects at Victoria University of Wellington. In September 2026, Peters appointed Johansson as New Zealand Ambassador to Sweden.

== Education and academic career ==
Johansson earned his Bachelor of Arts in psychology and political science, Bachelor of Arts with Honours, and Doctor of Philosophy at Victoria University of Wellington. As an undergraduate, he was awarded the K. J. Scott Memorial Prize for best political science or international relations Bachelor of Arts student in 1996 (joint) and the Alan Robinson Memorial Prize for best political science or international relations honours student in 1996 (joint). His PhD dissertation "seeks to extend our theoretical understanding of political leadership by constructing an Integrated Political Leadership Model, one that introduces a diverse range of essential leadership ideas into the New Zealand literature." For this thesis Johansson was awarded the Sir Desmond Todd Memorial Prize. He went on to become a senior lecturer in comparative politics at Victoria University and also became known as a political commentator and television political analyst, most especially during coverage of New Zealand and United States elections. A 2012 column by Thomas Friedman, "Elephants Down Under," featured Johansson's political musings.

Johansson's first monograph, Two Titans: Muldoon, Lange and Leadership was published in 2005 and was launched in Wellington by New Zealand First leader Winston Peters. Johansson addressed the New Zealand First annual conference two years later. In 2009, he published his second monograph, The Politics of Possibility: Leadership in Changing Times (see below), and spent the fall semester in Washington, D.C. as a Fulbright Visiting Scholar to Georgetown University. That led to the publication of his third monograph, and first on American politics, in 2014. After completing his residency in Washington, Johansson offered a 2010 analysis that the Barack Obama presidency would be either "a reconstructive era of genuine change and progress, or an unsatisfying pre-emptive presidency, marked by policy frustrations and ineffective tinkering" and that "the potential of reconstructive politics is all that stands in between America and a long slow decline."

=== Political career ===
Following the 2017 New Zealand general election it was announced that Johansson would serve as the chief of staff for New Zealand First, succeeding David Broome. This announcement was met with surprise, including from political commentator Bryce Edwards and Sir Bob Jones. New Zealand First was defeated in the 2020 election and Johansson became a communications consultant and newspaper columnist. One column reflected on things he regretted during his time as chief of staff: he nominated the government's decision to place responsibility for purchasing SeaGuardian drones with the Defence Force rather than the National Emergency Management Agency and reforming, rather than ending, the sport of greyhound racing.

He returned to politics after the 2023 election when New Zealand First was re-elected, taking a position as a special advisor on foreign affairs to New Zealand First leader and Foreign Affairs Minister Winston Peters.

In September 2026, Johansson was appointed as New Zealand Ambassador to Sweden by Foreign Minister Peters.

== Scholarship ==
=== Orewa Speech ===
Johansson published a criticism of the Orewa Speech, which was delivered by Don Brash, the then-Leader of the Opposition: "Whether intended or not, the Orewa speech reinforced the ignorant and racist stereotype that Māori were 'savages' before the 'gift' of European civilisation was visited upon them." This article appeared in a 2004 issue of Political Science, for which Johansson was guest editor.

=== Politics of Possibility ===
Johansson published The Politics of Possibility: Leadership in Changing Times in 2009. In this monograph, Johansson attempts to discern if there are cycles in New Zealand politics. Drawing on the scholarship of Arthur M. Schlesinger Jr. and Erwin C. Hargrove, Johansson articulates three types of periods in New Zealand politics: preparation, achievement and consolidation. Johansson categorised the Prime Ministers of New Zealand:

Preparation	Achievement	Consolidation
		Robert Muldoon
	David Lange	Geoffrey Palmer
	Jim Bolger (1990–1993)	Jim Bolger (1996–1998)
Jim Bolger (1993–1996)		Jenny Shipley
John Key		Helen Clark

Johansson also argued that there have been four transformative epochs in New Zealand political history. The first was the centralisation of government under Julius Vogel. The second was the emergence of an "active and fair state" under the Liberal administration of John Ballance and Richard Seddon. The third was the establishment of a comprehensive welfare state under the First Labour Government. The fourth was the monumental economic reforms under the Fourth Labour Government.

== Select bibliography ==
=== Journal articles ===
- Johansson, Jon (2004). "Orewa and the Rhetoric of Illusion". Political Science. 56 (2): 111–129. doi:10.1177/003231870405600212. ISSN 0032-3187.

=== Speeches ===
- Johansson, Jon (27 October 2007). Opportunities and challenges for New Zealand First in 2008 (Speech). New Zealand First party conference 2007. Taupō, New Zealand.

=== Monographs ===
- Johansson, Jon (2005). Two Titans: Muldoon, Lange and Leadership. Wellington, New Zealand: Dunmore Publishing. ISBN 978-1-877399-01-5.
- Johansson, Jon (2009). The Politics of Possibility: Leadership in Changing Times. Wellington, New Zealand: Dunmore Publishing. ISBN 978-1877399-46-6.
- Johansson, Jon (2014). US Leadership in Political Time and Space: Pathfinders, Patriots, and Existential Heroes. Palgrave McMillan. ISBN 978-1-137-38683-0.

=== Co-edited with Stephen Levine ===
- Johansson, Jon; Levine, Stephen (2013). Kicking the Tyres. Wellington: Victoria Univ. Press. ISBN 978-0-86473-834-9.
- Levine, Stephen; Johansson, Jon (2015). Moments of Truth. Wellington: Victoria Univ. Press. ISBN 978-1-77656-049-3.
