= Ted Johansson =

Swedish ice hockey player (born 1992)

- Born: June 29, 1992 (age 34) Arvidsjaur, Sweden
- Height: 5 ft 7 in (170 cm)
- Weight: 161 lb (73 kg; 11 st 7 lb)
- Position: Right wing
- Shoots: Right
- Elitserien team: Luleå HF
- Playing career: 2010–present

Ted Johansson (born June 29, 1992) is a Swedish professional ice hockey player. He played with Luleå HF in the Elitserien during the 2010–11 Elitserien season.
