= Catherine Millot =

French psychoanalyst and author (1944–2026)

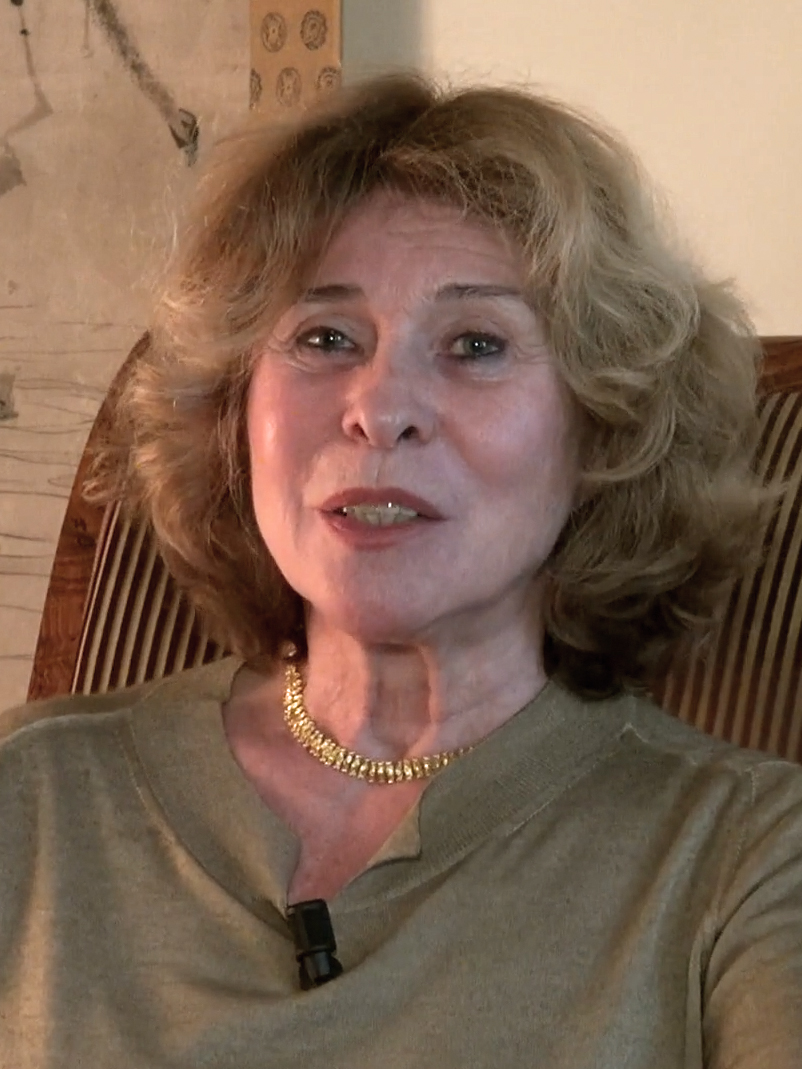
Millot in 2015

Catherine Millot (French: [mijo]; 4 September 1944 – 24 August 2026) was a French Lacanian psychoanalyst and author, who was a professor of psychoanalysis at the University of Paris VIII.

== Life and career ==
Millot was born in Villars-les-Dombes. She studied philosophy at the University of Paris before turning to psychoanalysis. In 1971 she started an eight-year analysis with Lacan, and attended his seminars from 1971 until his death.

In 1979, she completed a doctoral thesis on education in Freud's work, supervised by Yvon Belaval, at Paris 1 Panthéon-Sorbonne University. Her thesis, turned into the book Freud anti-pédagogue (1979), argued that pedagogy could not be based on psychoanalysis, since the role of analyst involved a radical openness to lack which was incompatible with the role of teacher. In 1975 she started teaching in the department of psychoanalysis at Paris VIII.

In 1983, in her book Horsexe, she asserted her belief that transgender women's gender identity involves a "psychotic" identification with an idealized figure of "the Woman."

Millot died on 24 August 2026 in Nice, at the age of 81.

== Works ==
- Freud anti-pédagogue, 1979
- Horsexe. Essai sur le transsexualisme, 1983. Translated as Horsexe. Essay on Transsexuality, 1990
- Nobodaddy. L'hystérie dans le siècle, Distribution Distique, 1988
- La vocation de l'écrivain, Gallimard, 1991
- Gide, Genet, Mishima. L'intelligence de la perversion, Gallimard, 1997
- Abîmes ordinaires, 2001
- La vie parfaite. Jeanne Guyon, Simone Weil, Etty Hillesum, 2006
- Ô solitude, 2011
