= Nanna Johansson =

Swedish cartoonist and a radio presenter (born 1986)

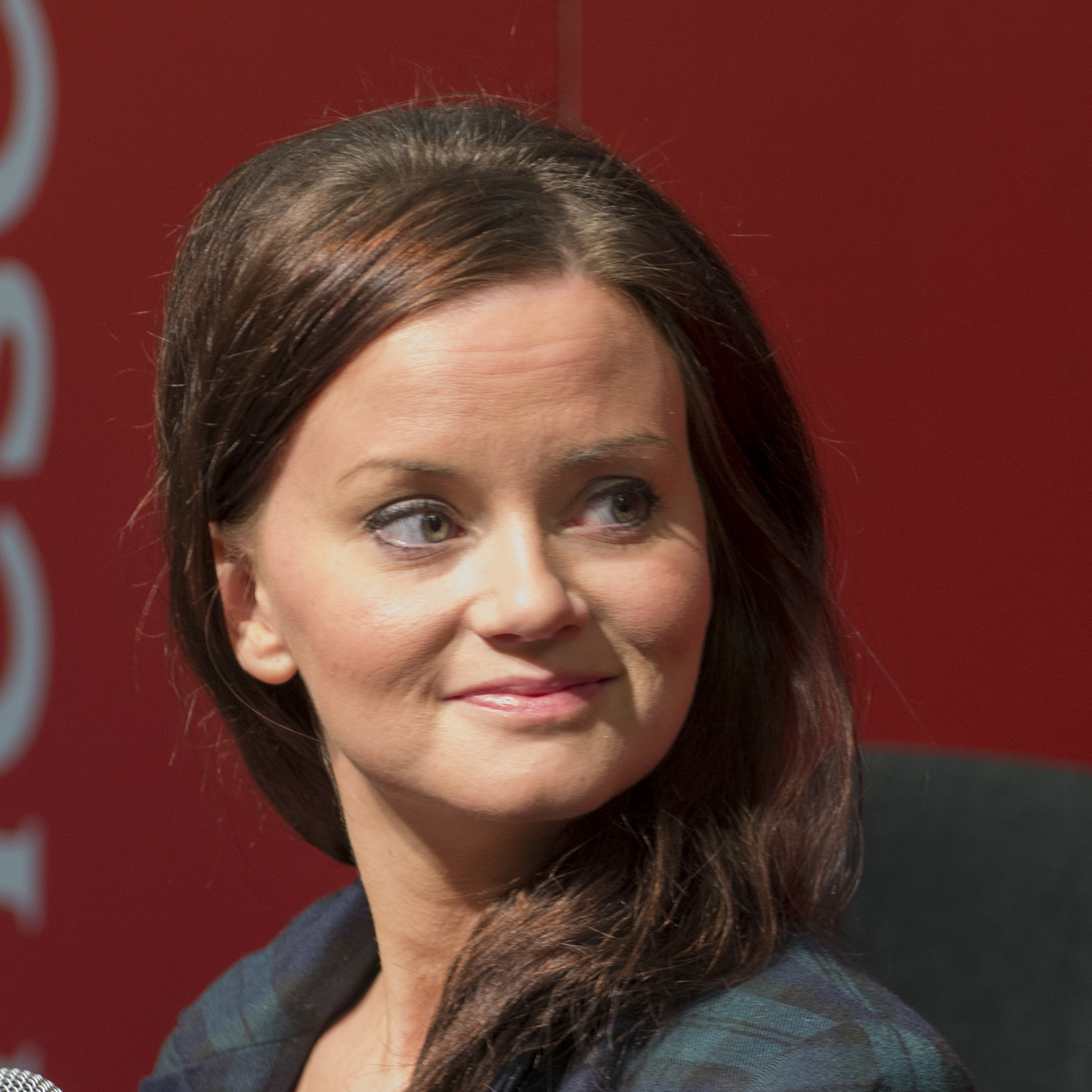
- Nanna Johansson (2013)
- Born: Nanna Elisabeth Johansson; 26 January 1986 (age 40); Gävle, Sweden

Nanna Elisabeth Johansson (born 26 January 1986) is a Swedish cartoonist and a radio presenter. She lives in Malmö where she has studied cartoon making at Kvarnby folkhögskola between 2007 and 2009. Her work has been published by Sydsvenskan, Bang, Nerikes Allehanda, Gefle Dagblad, and Smålandsposten. In 2008, she started hosting the radio show Pang Prego at Sveriges Radio, she has also been heard in Tankesmedjan i P3.

Since 2013, Johansson presents the podcast Lilla drevet at Aftonbladets website at the section Aftonbladet kultur.

== Exhibitions ==
Nanna Johansson / Comics at Bildmuseet, Umeå University, October 14, 2012 - December 2, 2012
