= Råå IF =

Swedish football club

- Full name: Råå Idrottsförening
- Founded: 1921; 105 years ago
- Ground: Råå IP, Råå, Sweden
- Chairman: Joakim Bergdahl
- Head coach: Arne Karstenbom
- League: Division 3 Sydvästra Götaland
- 2020: Division 3 Södra Götaland, 9th (Relegation Playoffs – Not Relegated)
- Website: http://www.raaif.se/
Home colours	Away colours

Råå Idrottsförening, commonly known as Råå IF, is a football club located in Råå at Öresund, Scania, south of Helsingborg. The club became the Swedish Cup champions in 1948, and the vice champions of the Allsvenskan, the highest league level in Swedish football in the 1950–51 season.

Råå IF is affiliated to the Skånes Fotbollförbund.

== Background ==
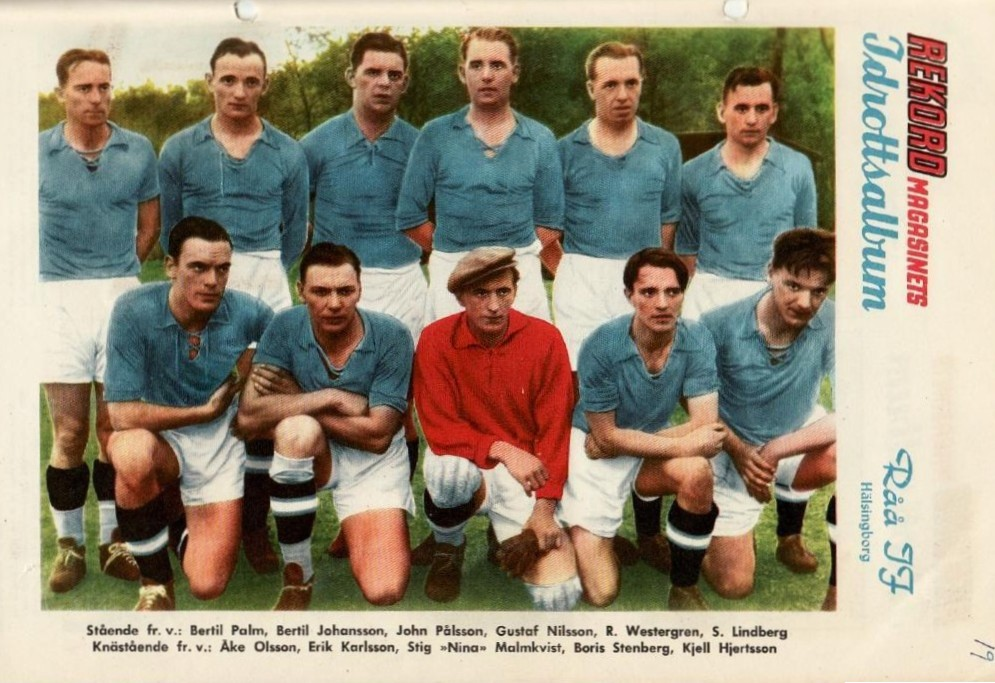
Råå during their heydays, in 1951.

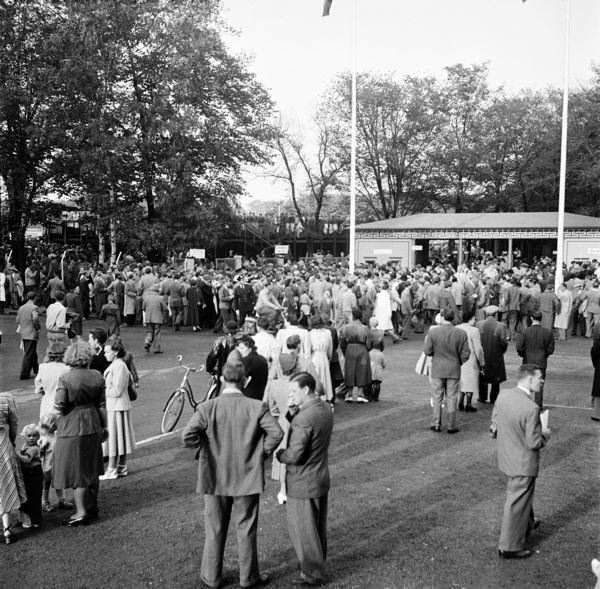
The Råå vs. Helsingborgs IF Allsvenskan top derby at a packed Olympia 1950.

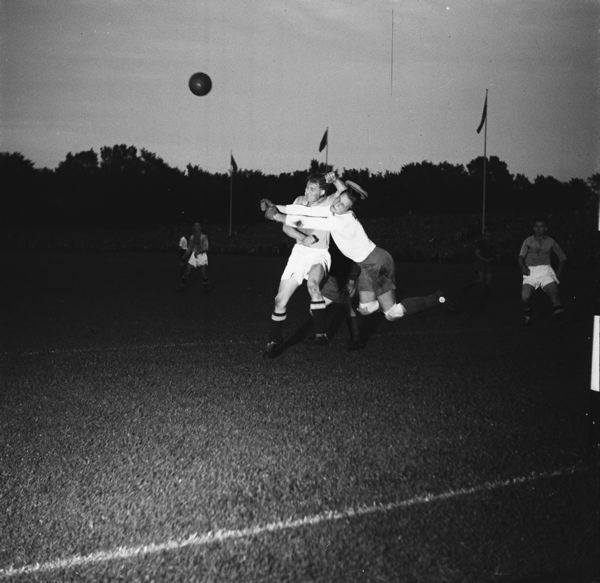
The Allsvenskan Helsingborg derby Råå vs. Helsingborgs IF 1950. Kalle Svensson boxes the ball in front of attacking Råå players.

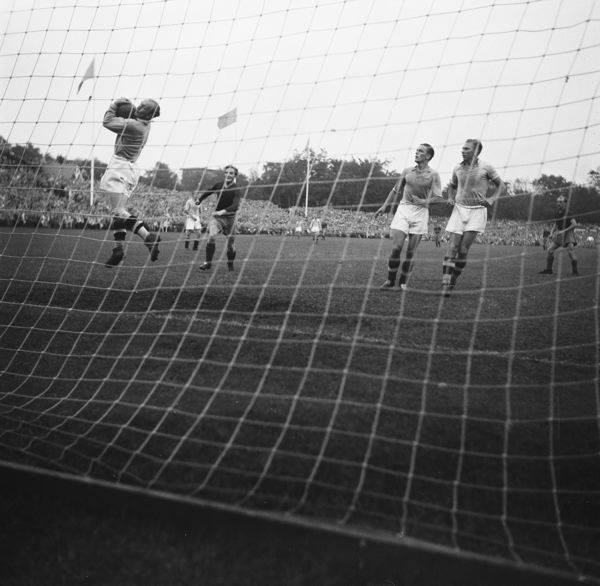
The top derby Råå vs Helsingborgs IF 1950. Råå goalkeeper Nina Malmqvist grabs the ball in front of Helsingborgs IF's Åke Jönsson. Åke Olsson and Dammis Karlsson of Råå are waiting on the right.

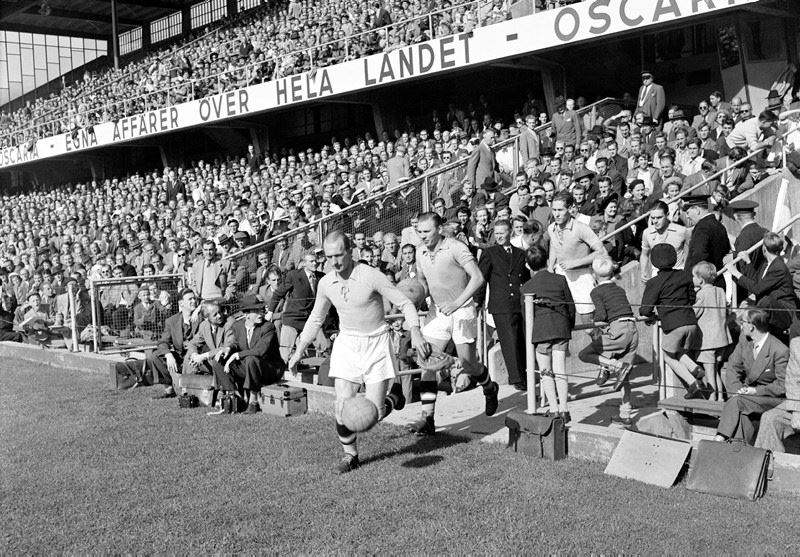
The Råå players enter the field in front of 23,300 spectators at Råsunda 19 September 1950 against AIK. Råå won the game 2–1.

Råå IF is a Swedish sports club that was established on 25 March 1921 by a group of high school students in a basement in the city district of Helsingborg, Tågaborg. The club was first called Enighet (lit. 'Unity'), but in 1925 it was renamed Råå Idrottsförening. Early matches were played at Valhallagatan but in 1928 they moved to Hedens idrottsplats. Råå IP was inaugurated on 29 May and Råå IF played their first match there against Stattena IF who won 3–1.

Since their foundation Råå IF has participated both in the upper and lower divisions of the Swedish football league system. Råå IF won the Swedish Cup in 1948 defeating BK Kenty by 6–0, and in 1950 under coach Albin Dahl the club advanced into the Allsvenskan (the Swedish top tier). In their first season in the Allsvenskan, Råå IF finished as runners-up. During this time, the club also had the Hungarian coach Kálmán Konrád of Bayern Munich, FC Zürich and Slavia Prague fame, who had escaped the World War II and ended up in Scania, first at Malmö FF, then at Råå) at their disposal.

During their two-year period in the Allsvenskan (1950–1952), Råå IF played at the Olympia in Helsingborg, attracting an average of 9,273 spectators. The record was 23,604 against Malmö FF

Fortunes have fluctuated dramatically over the subsequent years which reached rock bottom in 1996 when Råå IF were playing in Division 7. The club currently plays in Division 4 Skåne Nordvästra which is the sixth tier of Swedish football. They play their home matches at the Råå IP in Råå.

In 2012, Swedish international Henrik Larsson played one match for Råå IF in Division 3 Södra Götaland.

== Achievements ==
- Allsvenskan:
  - Runners-up: 1950–51
- Svenska Cupen:
  - Winner: 1948

== Season to season ==
In their most successful period Råå IF competed in the following divisions:

Season	Level	Division	Section	Position	Movements
1945–46	Tier 3	Division 3	Sydsvenska Södra	2nd	
1946–47	Tier 3	Division 3	Sydsvenska Södra	1st	Promotion Playoffs
1947–48	Tier 3	Division 3	Södra	1st	Promoted
1948–49	Tier 2	Division 2	Sydvästra	5th	
1949–50	Tier 2	Division 2	Sydvästra	1st	Promoted
1950–51	Tier 1	Allsvenskan		2nd	
1951–52	Tier 1	Allsvenskan		11th	Relegated
1952–53	Tier 2	Division 2	Sydvästra	6th	
1953–54	Tier 2	Division 2	Götaland	8th	
1954–55	Tier 2	Division 2	Götaland	4th	
1955–56	Tier 2	Division 2	Västra Götaland	8th	
1956–57	Tier 2	Division 2	Östra Götaland	8th	
1957–58	Tier 2	Division 2	Östra Götaland	2nd	
1959	Tier 2	Division 2	Östra Götaland	8th	
1960	Tier 2	Division 2	Östra Götaland	6th	
1961	Tier 2	Division 2	Östra Götaland	6th	
1962	Tier 2	Division 2	Östra Götaland	10th	Relegated
1963	Tier 3	Division 3	Södra Götaland	2nd	
1964	Tier 3	Division 3	Södra Götaland	2nd	
1965	Tier 3	Division 3	Södra Götaland	2nd	
1966	Tier 3	Division 3	Skåne	8th	
1967	Tier 3	Division 3	Skåne	9th	
1968	Tier 3	Division 3	Skåne	11th	Relegated
1969	Tier 4	Division 4	Skåne Nordvästra	4th	
1970	Tier 4	Division 4	Skåne Nordvästra	1st	Promoted
1971	Tier 3	Division 3	Skåne	10th	Relegated
1972	Tier 4	Division 4	Skåne Nordvästra	1st	Promotion Playoffs
1973	Tier 4	Division 4	Skåne Nordvästra	2nd	
1974	Tier 4	Division 4	Skåne Nordvästra	1st	Promoted
1975	Tier 3	Division 3	Skåne	1st	Promotion Playoffs – Promoted
1976	Tier 2	Division 2	Södra	11th	
1977	Tier 2	Division 2	Södra	12th	Relegated
1978	Tier 3	Division 3	Skåne	1st	Promotion Playoffs
1979	Tier 3	Division 3	Skåne	1st	Promotion Playoffs
1980	Tier 3	Division 3	Sydvästra Götaland	9th	
1981	Tier 3	Division 3	Sydvästra Götaland	5th	
1982	Tier 3	Division 3	Sydvästra Götaland	7th	
1983	Tier 3	Division 3	Skåne	3rd	
1984	Tier 3	Division 3	Skåne	4th	
1985	Tier 3	Division 3	Sydvästra Götaland	2nd	
1986	Tier 3	Division 3	Sydvästra Götaland	11th	Relegated

In recent seasons Råå IF have competed in the following divisions:

Season	Level	Division	Section	Position	Movements
1999	Tier 7	Division 6	Skåne Nordvästra B	1st	Promoted
2000	Tier 6	Division 5	Skåne Västra	5th	
2001	Tier 6	Division 5	Skåne Nordvästra	9th	
2002	Tier 6	Division 5	Skåne Mellersta	9th	
2003	Tier 6	Division 5	Skåne Nordvästra B	9th	
2004	Tier 6	Division 5	Skåne Nordvästra A	10th	
2005	Tier 6	Division 5	Skåne Västra	9th	Relegation Playoffs
2006*	Tier 7	Division 5	Skåne Västra	8th	
2007	Tier 7	Division 5	Skåne Västra	2nd	Promotion Playoffs
2008	Tier 7	Division 5	Skåne Västra	3rd	Promotion Playoffs – Promoted
2009	Tier 6	Division 4	Skåne Västra	4th	
2010	Tier 6	Division 4	Skåne Nordvästra	8th	
2011	Tier 6	Division 4	Skåne Nordvästra	1st	Promoted
2012	Tier 5	Division 3	Södra Götaland	5th	
2013	Tier 5	Division 3	Sydvästra Götaland	8th	
2014	Tier 5	Division 3	Södra Götaland	9th	Relegation Playoffs – Relegated
2015	Tier 6	Division 4	Skåne Västra	7th	
2016	Tier 6	Division 4	Skåne Norra	4th	
2017	Tier 6	Division 4	Skåne Nordvästra	4th	
2018	Tier 6	Division 4	Skåne Nordvästra	1st	Promoted
2019	Tier 5	Division 3	Sydvästra Götaland	6th	
2020	Tier 5	Division 3	Södra Götaland	9th	Relegation Playoffs – Not Relegated
2021	Tier 5	Division 3	Sydvästra Götaland		

* League restructuring in 2006 resulted in a new division being created at Tier 3 and subsequent divisions dropping a level.

== Attendances ==
In recent seasons Råå IF have had the following average attendances:

Season	Average attendance	Division / Section	Level
2009	Not available	Div 4 Skåne Västra	Tier 6
2010	103	Div 4 Skåne Nordvästra	Tier 6
2011	Not available	Div 4 Skåne Nordvästra	Tier 6
2012	309	Div 3 Södra Götaland	Tier 5
2013	221	Div 3 Sydvästra Götaland	Tier 5
2014	170	Div 3 Södra Götaland	Tier 5
2015	Not available	Div 4 Skåne Västra	Tier 6
2016	Not available	Div 4 Skåne Norra	Tier 6
2017	Not available	Div 4 Skåne Nordvästra	Tier 6
2018	Not available	Div 4 Skåne Nordvästra	Tier 6
2019	?	Div 3 Sydvästra Götaland	Tier 5
2020		Div 3 Sydvästra Götaland	Tier 5

* Attendances are provided in the Publikliga sections of the Svenska Fotbollförbundet website.

In their first season in the Allsvenskan in 1951–52 Råå IF had a home attendance of 23,604 spectators against Malmö FF at the Olympia football stadium in Helsingborg.
