= Thomas Johansson (footballer, born 1966) =

Swedish footballer

Personal information
- Date of birth: 1966 (age 59–60)

Senior career*
Years	Team	Apps	(Gls)
- Djurgården
- * Club domestic league appearances and goals

Thomas Johansson (born 1966) is a Swedish retired footballer. Johansson made 12 Allsvenskan appearances for Djurgården and scored 0 goals.
