= Katrin Johansson =

Finnish singer-songwriter

- Born: Helsinki, Finland
- Genres: Indie pop; dream pop; urban pop
- Occupation: Singer-songwriter
- Website: www.katrinjohansson.com

Katrin Johansson is a Finnish indie pop, dream pop and urban pop singer-songwriter from Helsinki. She released her first single, "One Last Kiss", in November 2014, and her music has been described as "cozy pop tracks" with a "lovely voice" and "Melodifestivalen vibe".

She has public prominence in Finland and carries out a social art project, Lonely Together, to promote intercultural competence through music. The goal of the project is to show how people with different backgrounds react to the same song, and participants explain their feelings about music and how it can make the world a better place.

Johansson was a finalist in the 2014 Great American Song Contest in the Singer-songwriter category and, in 2015, was nominated for the Golden Women Awards in the Entertainment category.

Her fourth single, "Free Your Mind", was released on 18 July 2017 and reached the Dutch Dance Top 40 chart.
