= Mikael Johansson (ice hockey, born 1995) =

Swedish ice hockey player

- Born: June 28, 1995 (age 30) Växjö, Sweden
- Height: 6 ft 3 in (191 cm)
- Weight: 209 lb (95 kg; 14 st 13 lb)
- Position: Forward
- Shoots: Right
- Alps Hockey League team Former teams: EHC Lustenau; Växjö Lakers; IK Oskarshamn; IK Pantern; IF Sundsvall Hockey; Kallinge-Ronneby IF; IF Troja-Ljungby; Kristianstads IK; EC Kitzbühel; SG Cortina; Fife Flyers
- NHL draft: Undrafted
- Playing career: 2013–present

Mikael Johansson (born June 28, 1995) is a Swedish ice hockey forward. He is currently playing with EHC Lustenau in the European Alps Hockey League (AlpsHL).

Johansson made his Swedish Hockey League debut playing with Växjö Lakers during the 2013–14 SHL season.
