= Bertil Johansson (footballer, born 1902) =

Swedish footballer

Personal information
- Full name: Axel Elof Bertil Johansson
- Date of birth: 7 December 1902
- Place of birth: Gothenburg, Sweden
- Date of death: 4 November 1975 (aged 72)
- Place of death: Gothenburg, Sweden
- Position: Forward

Senior career*
Years	Team	Apps	(Gls)
- Uddevalla

International career
1927	Sweden	2	(2)
- * Club domestic league appearances and goals

Axel Elof Bertil Johansson (7 December 1902 – 4 November 1975) was a Swedish footballer who played for Uddevalla. He featured twice for the Sweden men's national football team in 1927, scoring two goals.

== Career statistics ==
=== International ===
Appearances and goals by national team and year
National team	Year	Apps	Goals
Sweden	1927	2	2
Total		2	2

=== International goals ===
Scores and results list Sweden's goal tally first.

No	Date	Venue	Opponent	Score	Result	Competition
1.	2 September 1928	Stockholm Olympic Stadium, Stockholm, Sweden	Finland	3–0	6–2	Friendly
2.	2 September 1928	Stockholm Olympic Stadium, Stockholm, Sweden	Finland	5–1	6–2	Friendly
