= Patrik Johansson (bandy) =

Swedish Bandy player (born 1988)

Patrik Johansson (born 13 September 1988) is a Swedish bandy player who currently plays for Vetlanda BK as a forward. Patrick was a youth product of IFK Kungälv. Patrick has played three times for the Swedish U17 squad in the 2004/05 season.

Patrick has played for two clubs-

IFK Kungälv
Nässjö IF (2005-2006)
Vetlanda BK (2006-)
