= Martin Johansson (ice hockey, born 1977) =

Swedish ice hockey player

- Born: March 18, 1977 (age 48) Ängelholm, SWE
- Height: 6 ft 1 in (185 cm)
- Weight: 202 lb (92 kg; 14 st 6 lb)
- Position: Left wing
- Shot: Left
- Swe. 2nd Div team Former teams: Jonstorps IF; Rögle BK; IK Pantern; Tingsryds AIF; Nybro Vikings; Nyköpings Hockey
- Playing career: 1996–2011

Martin Johansson (born March 18, 1977, in Ängelholm, Sweden) is a Swedish professional ice hockey left winger currently playing for Jonstorps IF in the Swedish 2nd Division.

Johansson began his career for Rögle BK and also had spells with IK Pantern, Tingsryd AIF, Nybro Vikings and IF Nyköping before returning to Rögle in 2006. He helped the team reach Elitserien in 2008 but was not signed again for the 2008 winter season and instead signed for Jonstorps.

He lives in Ängelholm with his wife and two kids.

== Career statistics ==
			Regular season					Playoffs
Season	Team	League	GP	G	A	Pts	PIM	GP	G	A	Pts	PIM
1993–94	Rögle BK J18	J18 Elit	—	—	—	—	—	—	—	—	—	—
1994–95	Rögle BK J20	J20 Superelit	19	3	1	4	6	—	—	—	—	—
1995–96	Rögle BK J20	J20 Superelit	29	14	9	23	16	—	—	—	—	—
1996–97	Rögle BK J20	J20 Superelit	14	4	2	6	—	—	—	—	—	—
1996–97	Rögle BK	Division 1	21	4	2	6	10	—	—	—	—	—
1997–98	Rögle BK	Division 1	22	4	3	7	8	—	—	—	—	—
1998–99	IK Pantern	Division 2	13	10	8	18	—	—	—	—	—	—
1999–00	IK Pantern	Division 1	—	—	—	—	—	—	—	—	—	—
2000–01	Tingsryds AIF	Allsvenskan	37	7	7	14	18	—	—	—	—	—
2001–02	Tingsryds AIF	Allsvenskan	34	9	6	15	14	—	—	—	—	—
2002–03	Nybro Vikings IF	Allsvenskan	36	7	11	18	26	—	—	—	—	—
2003–04	Nybro Vikings IF	Allsvenskan	42	9	17	26	35	—	—	—	—	—
2004–05	IK Nyköping Hockey 90	Allsvenskan	43	8	19	27	14	10	2	0	2	8
2005–06	IK Nyköping Hockey 90	HockeyAllsvenskan	41	12	12	24	26	—	—	—	—	—
2006–07	Rögle BK J20	J20 Superelit	1	0	1	1	0	—	—	—	—	—
2006–07	Rögle BK	HockeyAllsvenskan	32	4	6	10	32	10	0	1	1	6
2007–08	Rögle BK	HockeyAllsvenskan	39	8	7	15	48	10	2	2	4	8
2008–09	Jonstorps IF	Division 2	34	17	28	45	54	—	—	—	—	—
2009–10	Jonstorps IF	Division 2	9	2	6	8	12	—	—	—	—	—
2010–11	Jonstorps IF	Division 2	—	—	—	—	—	—	—	—	—	—
2010–11	Helsingborgs HC	Division 2	3	1	4	5	2	—	—	—	—	—
HockeyAllsvenskan totals			112	24	25	49	106	20	2	3	5	14
