= Oscar Johansson (ice hockey) =

Swedish ice hockey player

- Born: 11 May 1988 (age 37) Karlshamn, Sweden
- Height: 6 ft 0 in (183 cm)
- Weight: 190 lb (86 kg; 13 st 8 lb)
- Position: Left wing
- Shoots: Left
- Allsv team Former teams: Borås HC; Timrå IK; IF Sundsvall Hockey
- National team: Sweden
- Playing career: 2006–present

Oscar Petter Johansson (born May 11, 1988) is a Swedish professional ice hockey winger, currently playing for Borås HC in the HockeyAllsvenskan.

== Career statistics ==
=== Regular season and playoffs ===
			Regular season					Playoffs
Season	Team	League	GP	G	A	Pts	PIM	GP	G	A	Pts	PIM
2004–05	Timrå IK	J20	21	13	4	17	20	—	—	—	—	—
2005–06	Timrå IK	J20	36	27	19	46	115	4	1	0	1	6
2006–07	Timrå IK	J20	39	23	8	31	161	—	—	—	—	—
2006–07	Timrå IK	SEL	3	0	0	0	0	—	—	—	—	—
2007–08	Timrå IK	SEL	2	0	0	0	0	—	—	—	—	—
2007–08	Timrå IK	J20	12	8	8	16	37	—	—	—	—	—
2007–08	IF Sundsvall Hockey	Allsv	34	7	7	14	26	—	—	—	—	—
2008–09	IF Sundsvall Hockey	Allsv	37	5	5	10	28	—	—	—	—	—
2009–10	IF Sundsvall Hockey	Allsv	44	14	7	21	50	10	4	5	9	6
2010–11	IF Sundsvall Hockey	Allsv	45	18	8	26	36	—	—	—	—	—
2011–12	IF Sundsvall Hockey	Allsv	51	18	7	25	56	10	0	1	1	18
NHL totals			211	62	34	96	196	20	4	6	10	24
