= Nils Johansson (politician) =

Swedish politician

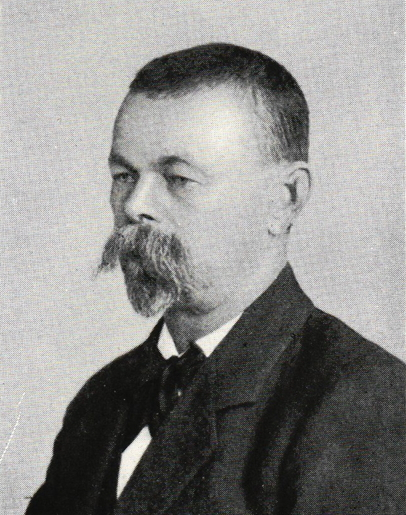
Nils Johansson 1864 SPA (cropped)

Nils Johansson (politician) (1864–1941) was a Swedish politician. He was a member of the Centre Party.
