= Oskar Johansson (footballer) =

Swedish footballer

Personal information
- Full name: Oskar Johansson
- Date of birth: 27 December 1990 (age 35)
- Place of birth: Sweden
- Height: 1.91 m (6 ft 3 in)
- Position: Defender

Team information
- Current team: Karlslunds IF
- Number: 5

Youth career
- Karlslunds IF

Senior career*
Years	Team	Apps	(Gls)
2006–2007	Karlslunds IF		
2008–2011	Örebro SK	2	(0)
2011	→ Örebro SK Ungdom	3	(0)
2011–	Karlslunds IF	17	(0)

International career
2007–2008	Sweden U19	5	(0)
- * Club domestic league appearances and goals as of 9 July 2012

Oskar Johansson (born 27 December 1990) is a Swedish footballer who plays for Karlslunds IF as a defender.
