= Per Johansson (trade unionist) =

Swedish trade unionist (born 1960)

Per Johansson (born 1960?) is a Swedish trade unionist, a Communist and labor organizer. He worked for Connex in the Stockholm Metro and was the leader of the local branch of the Swedish Union for Service and Communications Employees (SEKO), "club 119". Johansson was fired in late September 2005. According to SEKO it was due to complaints of neglected security and safety conditions for workers and passengers, while Connex asserted that Johansson was guilty of harassing and threatening colleagues and the management. The firing of the union leader resulted in a wildcat strike amongst the subway workers in Stockholm on the morning of October 6, 2005. More strikes followed in November. These were organised by a rival union, the anarcho-syndicalist SAC. The dismissal was challenged in the Swedish Labour Court (Arbetsdomstolen), which found that the dismissal was lawful and justified.

In the 1990s, Johansson was also a member of the Justice Party - the Socialists, a trotskyist organization.
