= Gustaf Torsten Johansson =

Swedish philatelist

Gustaf Torsten Johansson is a Swedish philatelist who was appointed to the Roll of Distinguished Philatelists in 2003. He is a specialist in the early stamps of Norway and Sweden and won a Grand Prix award at IBRA 99. His Norway collection was shown in the Court of Honour at Norwex 1997 when it was described as probably the best collection of Norway in the world.
