= Germany women's national artistic gymnastics team =

National sports team

Germany
- Continental union: European Union of Gymnastics
- National federation: German Gymnastics Federation

Olympic Games
- Appearances: 9
- Medals: Gold: 1936

European Championships
- Medals: Silver: 2025; Bronze: 2022

The Germany women's national artistic gymnastics team represents Germany in FIG international competitions.

== History ==
Germany has participated in the Olympic Games women's team competition nine times (twice as the United Team of Germany). They have won one medal, a gold in 1936.

== Current senior roster ==
Name	Birth date and age	Club
Anni Bantel	November 11, 2010 (age 16)	TSV Berkheim
Lara Baumgartl	September 29, 2009 (age 17)	TuS Chemnitz-Altendorf
Aliya-Jolie Funk	July 12, 2010 (age 16)	KTV Detmold
Marlene Gotthardt	July 30, 2008 (age 18)	MTV Stuttgart
Helen Kevric	March 21, 2008 (age 18)	MTV Stuttgart
Emma Malewski	July 18, 2004 (age 22)	TuS Chemnitz-Altendorf
Madita Mayr	July 6, 2010 (age 16)	TSV Jetzendorf
Janoah Müller	July 25, 2007 (age 19)	TG Mannheim
Yonca Özgül	December 6, 2010 (age 15)	Berliner Turnerschaft
Charleen Pach	September 17, 2010 (age 16)	TZ DSHS Köln
Lea Quass	July 22, 2005 (age 21)	TuS Chemnitz-Altendorf
Jesenia Schäfer	November 19, 2009 (age 17)	TuS Chemnitz-Altendorf
Pauline Schäfer-Betz	January 4, 1997 (age 29)	KTV Chemnitz
Karina Schönmaier	August 4, 2005 (age 21)	TuS Chemnitz-Altendorf
Silja Stöhr	May 13, 2008 (age 18)	TG Mannheim
Frederika Suhl	November 17, 2010 (age 16)	Berliner TSC
Lisa Wötzel	November 9, 2008 (age 18)	TuS Chemnitz-Altendorf

== Team competition results ==
=== Olympic Games ===
Year	Position	Squad
1936	gold medal	Anita Bärwirth, Erna Bürger, Isolde Frölian, Friedl Iby, Trudi Meyer, Paula Pöhlsen, Julie Schmitt, Käthe Sohnemann
1948	banned from participating	
1952	5th place	Irma Walther, Hanna Grages, Elisabeth Ostermeyer, Wolfgard Voß, Inge Sedlmaier, Lydia Zeitlhofer, Brigitte Kiesler, Hilde Koop
1960	6th place	competed as United Team of Germany
1964	4th place	competed as United Team of Germany
1968 through 1988 — participated as East Germany and West Germany
1992	9th place	Jana Günther, Annette Potempa, Anke Schönfelder, Diana Schröder, Kathleen Stark, Gabriele Weller
1996 through 2004 – did not qualify a full team
2008	12th place	Katja Abel, Daria Bijak, Anja Brinker, Oksana Chusovitina, Marie-Sophie Hindermann, Joeline Möbius
2012	9th place	Janine Berger, Kim Bui, Nadine Jarosch, Oksana Chusovitina, Elisabeth Seitz
2016	6th place	Tabea Alt, Kim Bui, Pauline Schäfer, Sophie Scheder, Elisabeth Seitz
2020	9th place	Kim Bui, Pauline Schäfer, Elisabeth Seitz, Sarah Voss
2024	did not qualify a full team	

=== World Championships ===
Year	Position	Squad
2006	16th place	Daria Bijak, Kim Bui, Oksana Chusovitina, Heike Gunne, Svenja Hickel, Theresa Sporer
2007	10th place	Katja Abel, Anja Brinker, Jenny Brunner, Oksana Chusovitina, Marie-Sophie Hindermann, Joeline Möbius
2010	14th place	Oksana Chusovitina, Lisa Katharina Hill, Giulia Hindermann, Joeline Möbius, Elisabeth Seitz, Pia Tolle
2011	6th place	Kim Bui, Oksana Chusovitina, Lisa Katharina Hill, Nadine Jarosch, Elisabeth Seitz, Pia Tolle
2014	9th place	Cagla Akyol, Kim Bui, Lisa Katharina Hill, Pauline Schäfer, Sophie Scheder, Elisabeth Seitz
2015	12th place	Leah Griesser, Lisa Katharina Hill, Pauline Schäfer, Sophie Scheder, Elisabeth Seitz, Pauline Tratz
2018	8th place	Kim Bui, Leah Griesser, Sophie Scheder, Elisabeth Seitz, Sarah Voss
2019	9th place	Kim Bui, Emelie Petz, Pauline Schäfer, Elisabeth Seitz, Sarah Voss
2022	12th place	Anna-Lena König, Emma Malewski, Lea Marie Quaas, Karina Schönmaier, Elisabeth Seitz
2023	13th place	Meolie Jauch, Lea Marie Quaas, Pauline Schäfer, Karina Schönmaier, Sarah Voss
2026	10th place	Helen Kevric, Emma Malewski, Madita Mayr, Lea Marie Quaas, Karina Schönmaier, Charleen Pach

=== Junior World Championships ===
Year	Position	Squad
2019	8th place	Jasmin Haase, Emma Malewski, Lea Marie Quaas
2023	7th place	Marlene Gotthardt, Helen Kevric, Silja Stöhr
2025	14th place	Ebba Mühl, Yonca Özgül, Charleen Pach

== Most decorated gymnasts ==
This list includes all German female artistic gymnasts who have won a medal at the Olympic Games or the World Artistic Gymnastics Championships. It only includes medals won while Germany competed as a unified team and not separately as East Germany and West Germany. Additionally, for Oksana Chusovitina it only includes medals she won while competing for Germany.

Rank	Gymnast	Team	AA	VT	UB	BB	FX	Olympic Total	World Total	Total
1	Pauline Schäfer					2017; 2021; 2015		0	3	3
2	Oksana Chusovitina			2008; 2011; 2006				1	2	3
3	Anita Bärwirth	1936						1	0	1
3	Erna Bürger	1936						1	0	1
3	Isolde Frölian	1936						1	0	1
3	Friedl Iby	1936						1	0	1
3	Trudi Meyer	1936						1	0	1
3	Paula Pöhlsen	1936						1	0	1
3	Julie Schmitt	1936						1	0	1
3	Käthe Sohnemann	1936						1	0	1
11	Helen Kevric				2026			0	1	1
11	Birgit Radochla			1964				1	0	1
13	Tabea Alt					2017		0	1	1
13	Sophie Scheder				2016			1	0	1
13	Elisabeth Seitz				2018			0	1	1

== See also ==
- German Artistic Gymnastics Championships
- Germany men's national gymnastics team
- List of Olympic female artistic gymnasts for Germany
