= List of Olympic female artistic gymnasts for Germany =

Gymnastics events have been staged at the Olympic Games since 1896, with women competing for the time at the 1928 Olympic Games. German female gymnasts participated in the 1936 and 1952 Olympics prior to the separation of East and West Germany. At the 1960 and 1964 Olympics they competed as a United Team of Germany. Between 1968–1988 East Germany and West Germany competed separately. Since 1992 a unified Germany has sent at least one female gymnast to compete the Olympic Games with the exception of 2000. Kim Bui, Elisabeth Seitz, and Pauline Schäfer have represented Germany at the most Olympic Games with three. Ute Starke also competed at three Olympics but represented the United Team of Germany twice and East Germany once.

== Gymnasts ==
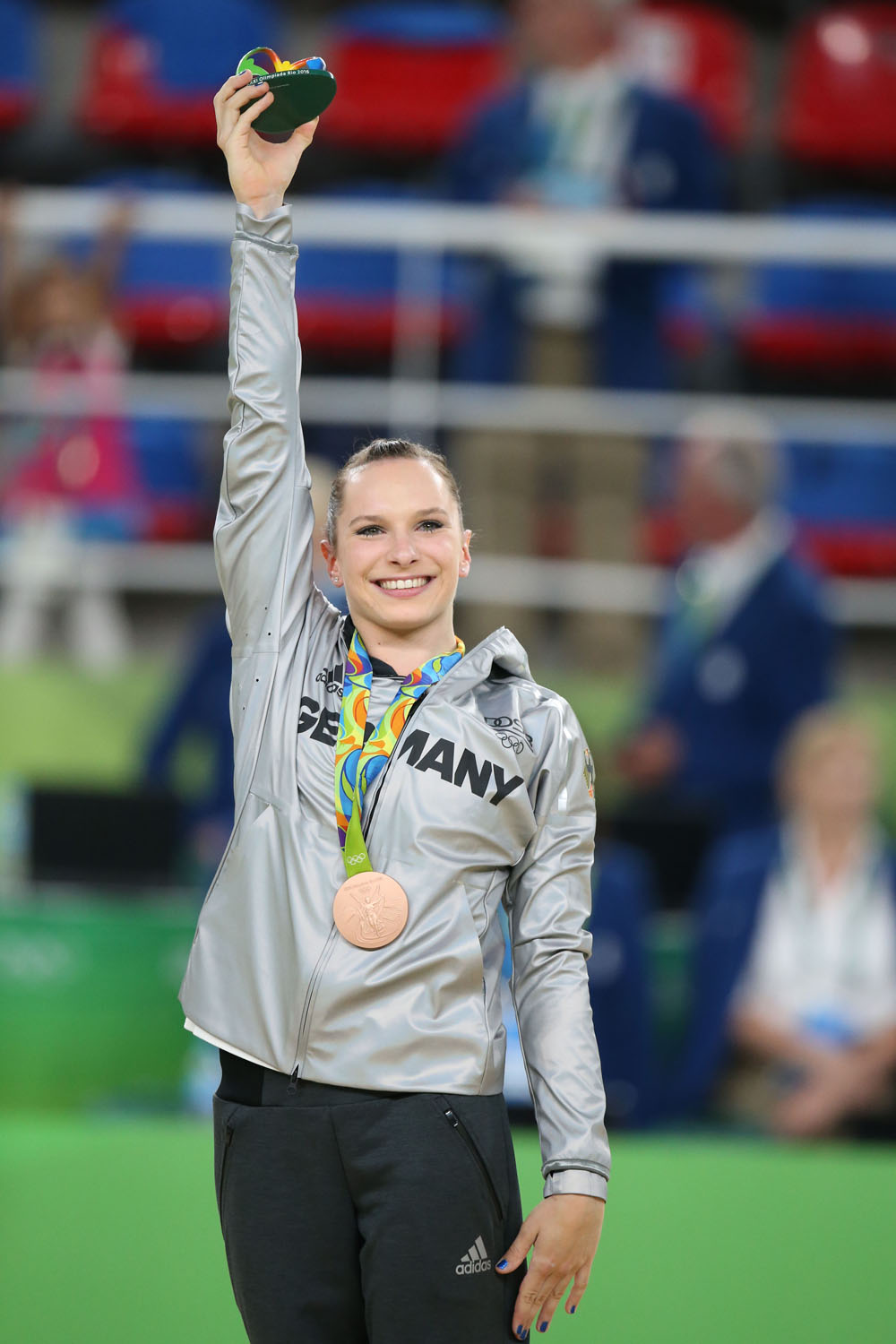
Sophie Scheder at the 2016 Olympics

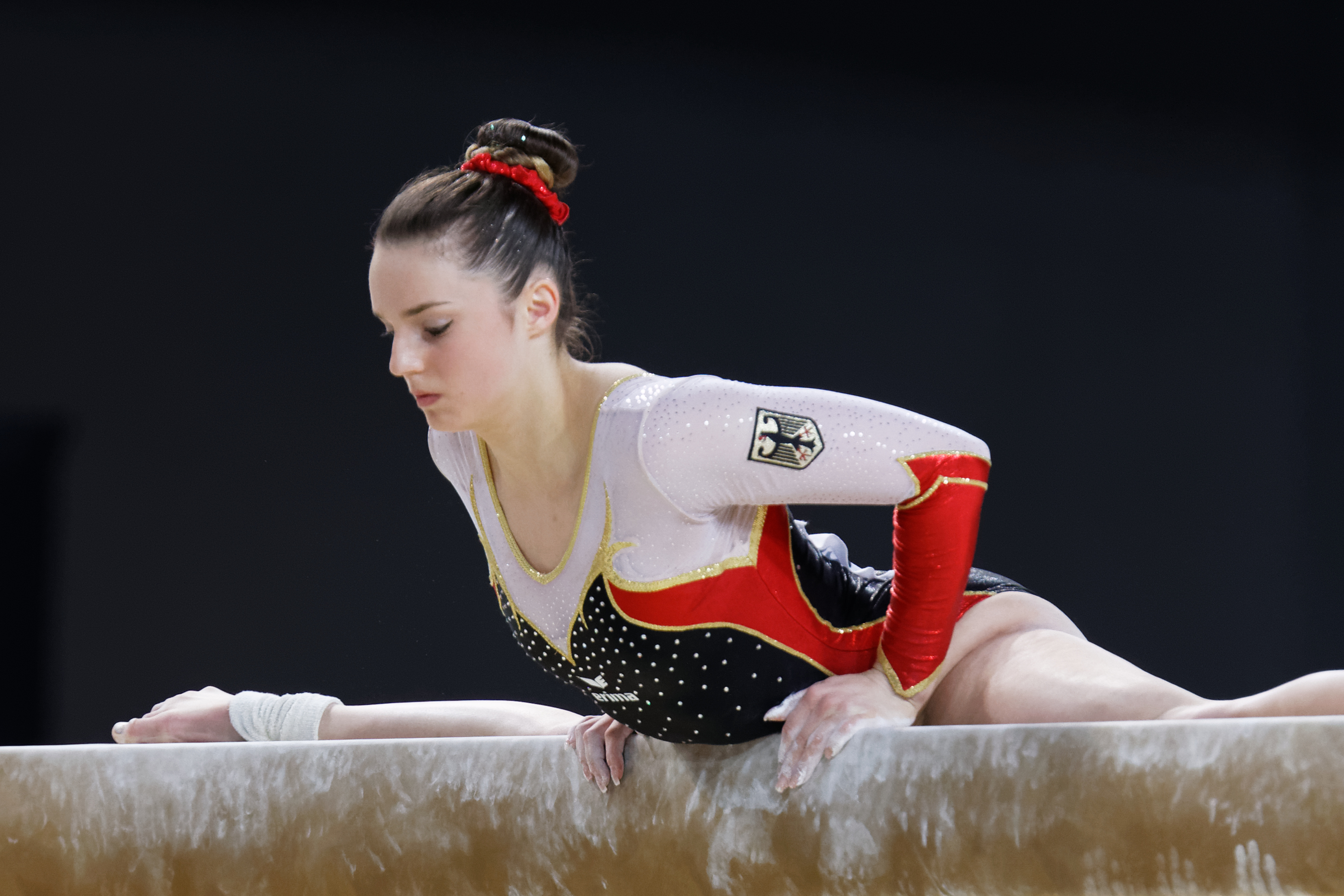
Pauline Schäfer in 2015

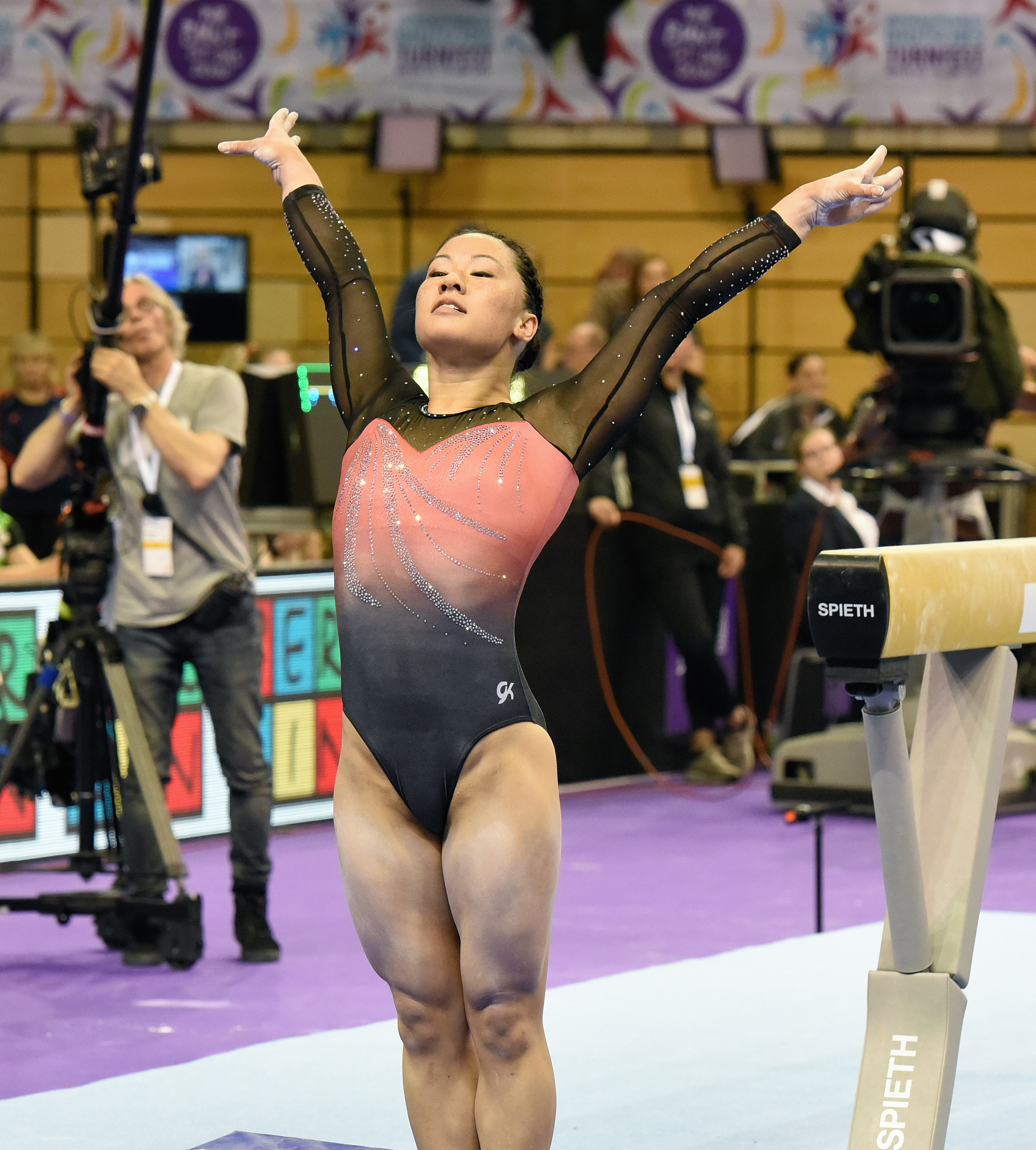
Kim Bui in 2017

Gymnast	Years	Ref.
Katja Abel	2008	
Tabea Alt	2016	
Anita Bärwirth	1936	
Janine Berger	2008	
Daria Bijak	2008	
Karin Boldemann	1960	
Anja Brinker	2008	
Lisa Brüggemann	2004	
Kim Bui	2012, 2016, 2020	
Erna Bürger	1936	
Oksana Chusovitina	2008, 2012	
Christel Felgner	1964	
Ingrid Föst	1960, 1964	
Isolde Frölian	1936	
Hanna Grages	1952	
Jana Günther	1992	
Marie-Sophie Hindermann	2008	
Friedl Iby	1936	
Nadine Jarosch	2012	
Helen Kevric	2024	
Brigitte Kiesler	1952	
Hilde Koop	1952	
Karin Mannewitz	1964	
Trudi Meyer	1936	
Joeline Möbius	2008	
Yvonne Musik	2004	
Elisabeth Ostermeyer	1952	
Yvonne Pioch	1996	
Paula Pöhlsen	1936	
Annette Potempa	1992	
Birgit Radochla	1964	
Pauline Schäfer	2016, 2020, 2024	
Sophie Scheder	2016	
Gretel Schiener	1960	
Julie Schmitt	1936	
Renate Schneider	1960	
Anke Schönfelder	1992	
Diana Schröder	1992	
Inge Sedlmaier	1952	
Elisabeth Seitz	2012, 2016, 2020	
Käthe Sohnemann	1936	
Roselore Sonntag	1960	
Kathleen Stark	1992, 1996	
Ute Starke	1960, 1964	
Barbara Stolz	1964	
Sarah Voss	2020, 2024	
Wolfgard Voß	1952	
Irma Walther	1952	
Gabriele Weller	1992	
Lydia Zeitlhofer	1952	

== Medalists ==
Medal	Name	Year	Event
Gold	Bärwirth, Bürger, Frölian, Iby, Meyer, Pöhlsen, Schmitt, Sohnemann	(Germany) 1936 Berlin	Women's team
Silver	Birgit Radochla	(Japan) 1964 Tokyo	Women's vault
Silver	Oksana Chusovitina	(China) 2008 Beijing	Women's vault
Bronze	Sophie Scheder	(Brazil) 2016 Rio de Janeiro	Women's uneven bars

== See also ==
- List of Olympic male artistic gymnasts for Germany
