= Kim Bui =

German artistic gymnast

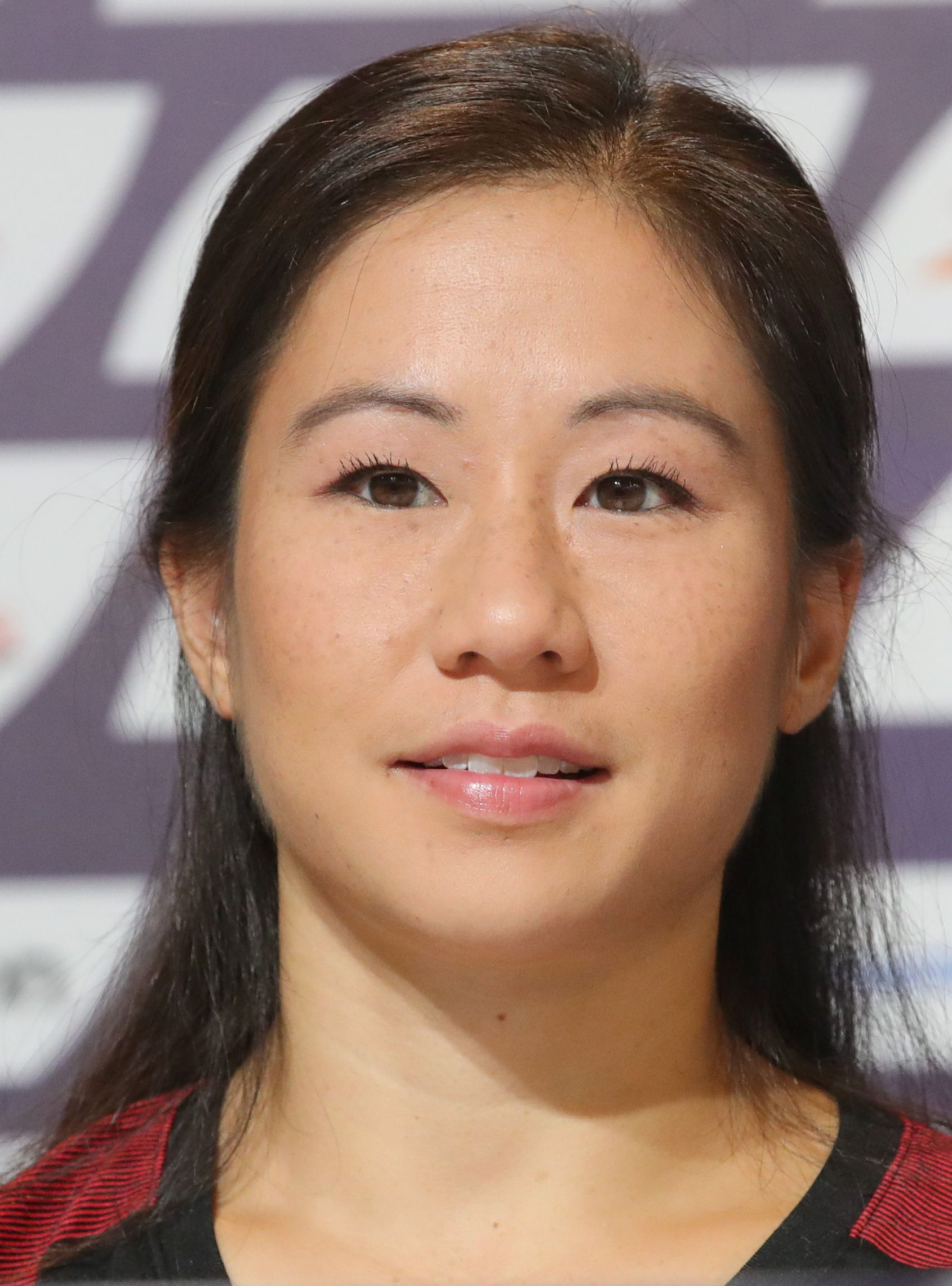
- Bui in 2022

Personal information
- Full name: Kim Ngan Bui
- Born: 20 January 1989 (age 37) Tübingen, West Germany
- Height: 1.56 m (5 ft 1 in)

Gymnastics career
- Discipline: Women's artistic gymnastics
- Country represented: Germany; (2004–2022)
- Club: MTV Stuttgart
- Retired: 14 August 2022
Medal record
Women's artistic gymnastics
Representing Germany
Event / 1st / 2nd / 3rd; FIG World Cup / 1 / 9 / 9
European Championships
| Bronze medal – third place | 2011 Berlin | Uneven Bars |
| Bronze medal – third place | 2022 Munich | Team |
Summer Universiade
| Silver medal – second place | 2017 Taipei | Uneven Bars |
| Bronze medal – third place | 2013 Kazan | Team |
| Bronze medal – third place | 2013 Kazan | All-Around |
- Education: University of Stuttgart

Kim Bui (born 20 January 1989) is a retired German artistic gymnast. She represented Germany at the 2012, 2016, and 2020 Olympic Games. She is the 2009 and 2014 German National Champion and the 2011 European bronze medalist on the uneven bars. In her final competition, she was part of the first German team to win a European team medal. She was elected to the IOC Athletes' Commission for a term of eight years in 2024.

== Early life and education ==
Bui was born in Tübingen in 1989 to a Vietnamese mother and a Lao father.

Bui studied technical biology at the University of Stuttgart. She graduated in 2015 and interned at the Fresenius Medical Care company in the International Marketing and Medicine division. After the Rio Olympics she began her master's degree in technical biology.

== Gymnastics career ==
=== 2005 ===
At the German National Championships Bui finished fourth in the all-around. In November Bui participated at the Leverkusen Cup alongside Daria Bijak and Janine Hardt where she helped Germany finish first in the team competition ahead of Belgium and Mexico. Individually she finished fifth in the all-around and on uneven bars and third on vault and floor exercise. She was later selected to represent Germany at the World Championships in Melbourne alongside Bijak. During qualifications Bui finished 28th in the all-around and was the fourth reserve for the final.

=== 2006 ===
In April Bui competed at the European Championships in Volos alongside Daria Bijak, Katja Abel, Jenny Brunner, and Julia Hänel where Germany finished eleventh in qualifications and were the third reserve for the team final. At the German National Championships Bui place second in the all-around behind Bijak. During event finals she won gold on floor exercise, silver on vault and balance beam, and placed fourth on uneven bars. In October Bui competed at the World Championships where Germany placed sixteenth during qualifications and did not advance to the team final.

=== 2007 ===
Bui competed at the European Championships where she was the second reserve for the uneven bars final. She was an alternate for the World Championships in Stuttgart. In November she competed at the Cottbus World Cup where she placed sixth on floor exercise. She also competed at the Glasgow Grand Prix where she placed fourth on vault and six on floor exercise.

=== 2008 ===
At the German National Championships Bui won gold on floor exercise and vault and silver on uneven bars. Bui was named an alternate for the 2008 Olympic Games. In October she competed at the Glasgow Grand Prix where she won silver on vault, bronze on uneven bars, and placed fifth on floor exercise. The following month she competed at the Stuttgart World Cup where she won bronze on floor exercise and placed fifth on vault and uneven bars.

=== 2009 ===
In February Bui competed at the American Cup where she won the bronze behind Americans Jordyn Wieber and Bridget Sloan. In March she competed at the Cottbus World Cup where she placed second on floor exercise behind Sui Lu of China, fourth on vault, and seventh on uneven bars. Later that month she competed at the European Championships where she placed fifth on vault and sixteenth in the all-around.

At the German National Championships Bui placed first in the all-around, on vault, and on floor exercise, second on uneven bars, and third on balance beam. She was later selected to represent Germany at the 2009 World Championships alongside Elisabeth Seitz, Maike Roll, and Anja Brinker. She qualified to the all-around final where she placed 23rd during the final.

In November Bui competed at the Stuttgart World Cup where she won gold on uneven bars, silver on floor exercise behind Sui, and bronze on vault behind Jana Komrsková and Ariella Käslin.

=== 2010 ===
In February Bui injured her ACL and was out for the majority of the season. She returned to competition in November, competing on uneven bars at the Bundesliga final.

=== 2011 ===
In March Bui competed at the Cottbus World Cup where she won bronze on the uneven bars behind Yao Jinnan and Elisabeth Seitz. In April Bui competed at the European Championships in Berlin, Germany. She performed only on the uneven bars and qualified in 5th position to the event final with a score of 14.450. She improved her score to 14.675 to win the bronze medal in the final behind Beth Tweddle of Great Britain and Tatiana Nabieva of Russia. At the German National Championships Bui placed second in the all-around behind Elisabeth Seitz, third on floor exercise, and fourth on vault, uneven bars, and balance beam.

In September Bui competed at the Switzerland-Germany-Romania Friendly, helping Germany finish in second place behind Romania. She was later named to the team to compete at the 2011 World Championships alongside Seitz, Oksana Chusovitina, Lisa Katharina Hill, Nadine Jarosch, and Pia Tolle. Together they placed sixth in the team final which is the highest placement Germany has reached since German reunification.

Bui competed at the Stuttgart World Cup where she placed second behind Huang Qiushuang of China. She next competed at the Tokyo World Cup where she placed third behind Huang and Yu Minobe of Japan.

=== 2012 ===
In March Bui competed at the Cottbus World Cup where she won bronze on floor exercise behind Diana Chelaru and Luiza Galiulina and placed fourth on balance beam.

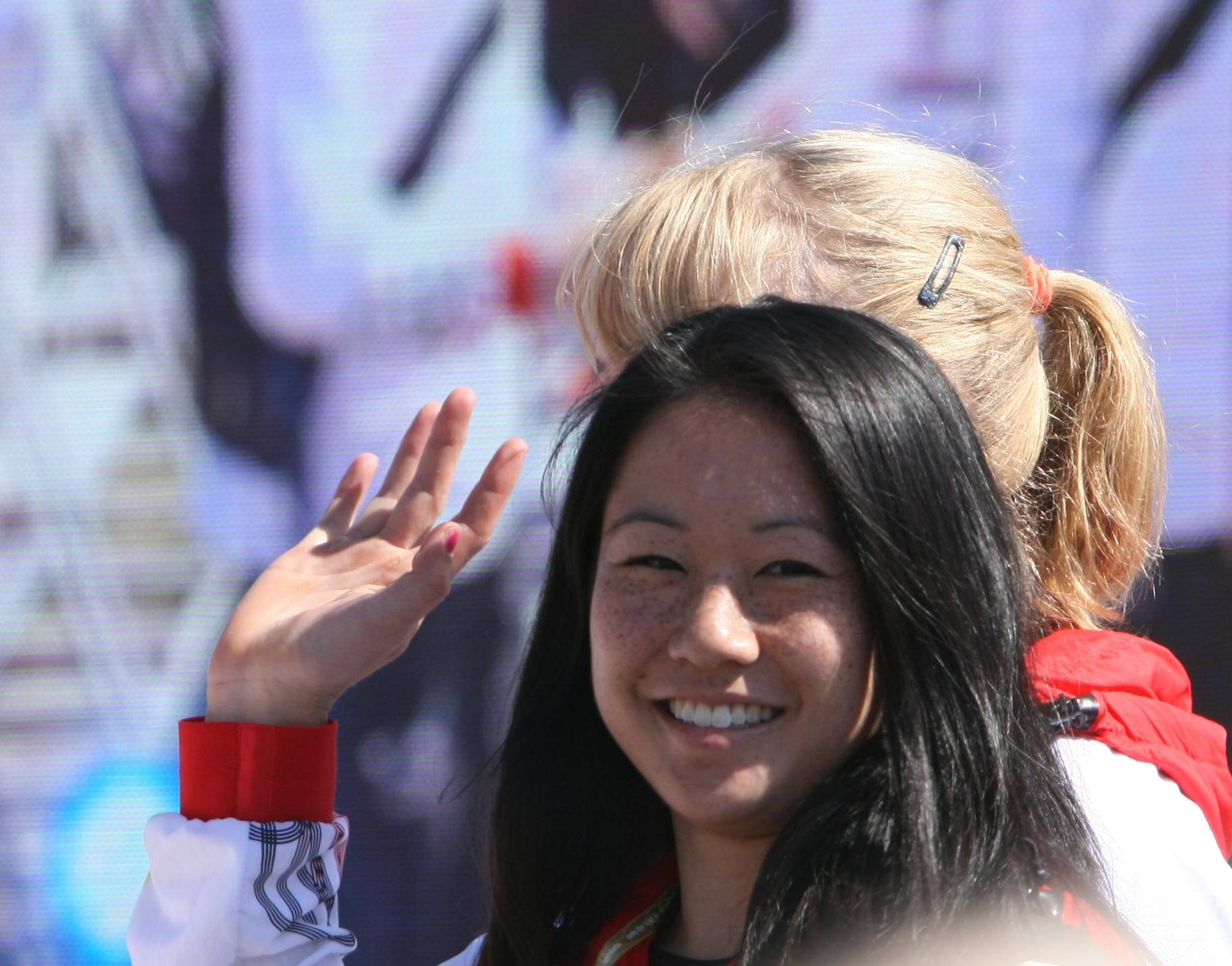
Kim Bui in 2012

Bui competed at the 2012 Summer Olympics and finished in ninth place with the German team. She failed to reach finals in her three individual events, qualifying in 19th place on uneven bars, 56th place on beam, and 37th place on floor.

In November, she teamed up with Marcel Nguyen to compete at the Swiss Cup in Zürich. They won the bronze medal behind Elisabeth Seitz and Fabian Hambüchen of Germany and Giulia Steingruber and Claudio Capelli of Switzerland. In December she competed at the Stuttgart World Cup, placing fourth in the all-around competition. She next competed in the Glasgow World Cup where she won the bronze behind Elizabeth Price and Seitz.

=== 2013 ===
Bui competed at the German National Championships in Rhein-Neckar in May, performing well to win gold on vault with 14.249, silver on floor scoring 14.266, and bronze in the all-around with an overall score of 54.032.

She later competed at the Anadia World Cup in Portugal, placing fourth on vault and floor, sixth on uneven bars, and fifth on beam. That July, Bui competed at the Summer Universiade in Kazan, contributing to Germany's bronze medal finish. She also took bronze in the all-around, edging out Canada's rising star Ellie Black. In event finals, she placed eighth on vault, fourth on uneven bars, and fourth on floor.

Bui did not compete internationally again until the Arthur Gander Memorial in late October, placing fourth in the all-around. She was named to one of the German teams for the Stuttgart World Cup in November, where she won the bronze medal in the Team Challenge.

=== 2014 ===
In March, Bui competed at the Cottbus World Cup in Germany. She won silver on vault and floor exercise in event finals, scoring 14.262 and 13.925 respectively, and placed fourth on uneven bars. In April she travelled to Japan for the Tokyo Cup where she placed 7th in the all-around competition.

In May, she competed at the 2014 European Championships in Sofia, Bulgaria alongside Cagla Akyol, Janine Berger, Pauline Schäfer, and Sophie Scheder. Together they placed fourth in the team final. Individually Bui qualified to the vault final in 8th place with a score of 13.899, and to the uneven bars final in 7th place with a score of 14.500. In the vault event final Bui placed seventh with a score of 13.916, and in the bars event final, she scored 14.400 to finish seventh.

At the German National Championships in August, she claimed the gold medal in the all-around and floor exercise competitions, as well as taking silver on uneven bars and bronze on vault, and placing fifth on beam. The following week, the German team competed at a friendly meet against Switzerland and Romania in Obersiggenthal, Switzerland, winning a surprise team gold medal. Kim Bui individually won silver medals on uneven bars and floor exercise. She later competed at the Länderkampf Kunstturnen friendly competition she helped Germany place first as a team and individually she placed fourth behind Larisa Iordache, Giulia Steingruber, and Schäfer.

Bui was named to the German team which competed at the World Championships in Nanning, China. She competed on all four pieces in the qualifying round, but the team placed 9th and did not advance to the final team competition. Bui individually did not qualify for any finals, placing 31st in the all-around qualification (4th reserve), 24th on uneven bars, 23rd on beam and 154th on floor.

In late November, she competed at the Stuttgart World Cup, edging out seasoned competitors such as Vanessa Ferrari and Aliya Mustafina to win the bronze medal in the all-around competition, finishing behind Iordache and Jessica López.

=== 2015 ===
In April, Bui competed at the Bundesliga competition in Mannheim, Germany, where she performed on vault, uneven bars, and floor exercise. The following month she tore her ACL and was out for the remainder of the season.

=== 2016 ===
Bui returned to competition in May where she competed at the São Paulo World Cup. While there she won silver on the uneven bars behind Jessica López and tied with Rebeca Andrade and on floor exercise behind Daniele Hypólito and she placed sixth on balance beam. Bui was selected to represent Germany at the European Championships alongside Sarah Voss, Lina Philipp, Maike Enderle, and Amélie Föllinger. While there she helped Germany finish seventh in the team final and individually she finished fourth on uneven bars behind Becky Downie, Daria Spiridonova, and Aliya Mustafina. In June she competed at the German National Championships where she placed fourth in the all-around and on balance beam, third on uneven bars, and second on floor exercise. The following month she competed at the Olympic Trials where she finished third and was named to the Olympic team alongside Elisabeth Seitz, Pauline Schäfer, Sophie Scheder, and Tabea Alt. Prior to the Olympic Games Bui and the German team competed at a friendly competition in Chemnitz where Germany finished first as a team and individually Bui finished seventh in the all-around.

Bui competed at the 2016 Summer Olympics in Rio de Janeiro. The team finished in sixth place in the women's team all-around competition. in which she competed uneven bars and floor exercise for Germany. She did not qualify for any event finals, finishing 19th on uneven bars and 29th on floor exercise.

In November Bui competed at the Swiss Cup where she was partnered with Marcel Nguyen. Together they finished second behind the Ukrainian team composed of Oleg Verniaiev and Angelina Kysla.

=== 2017 ===
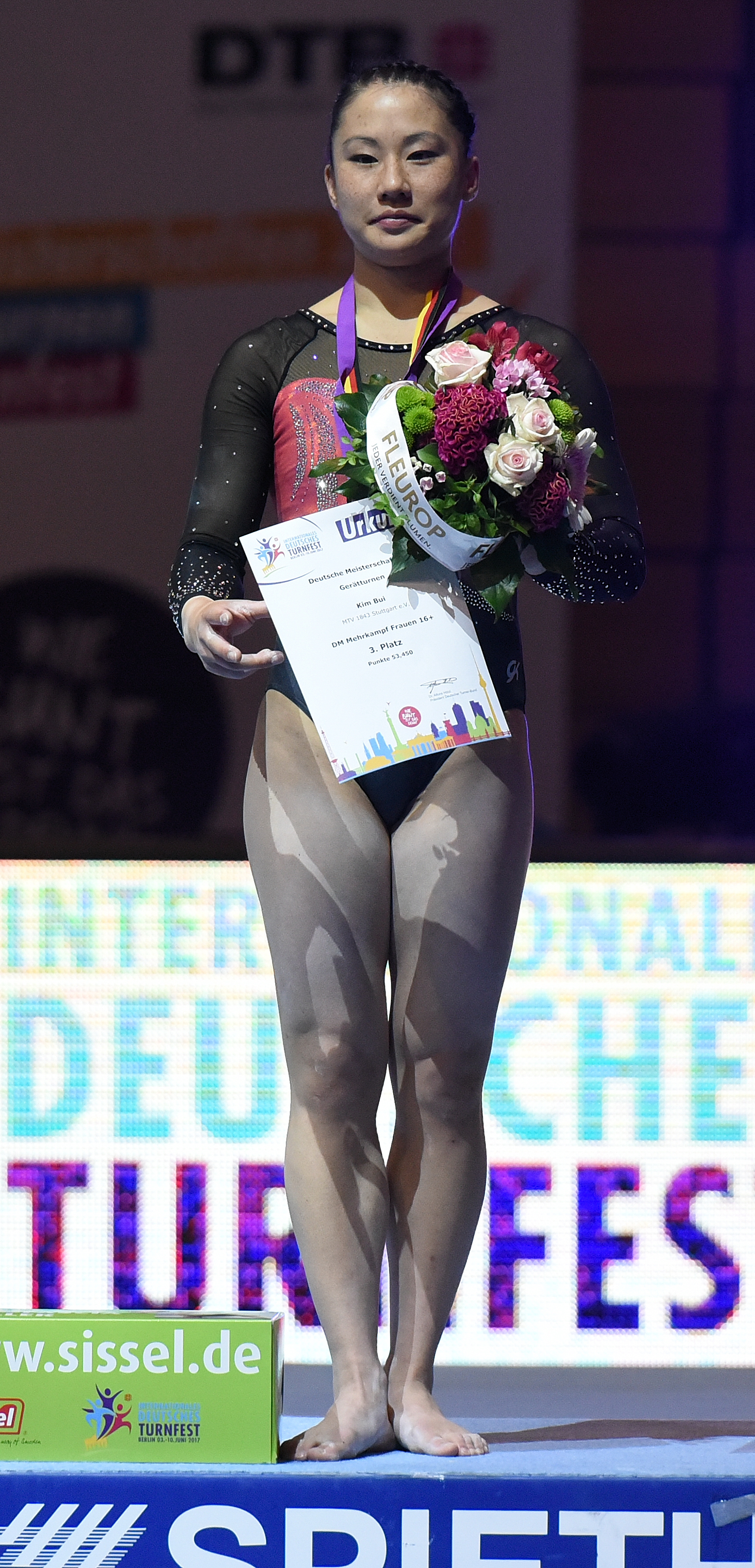
Bui in 2017

In March Bui competed at the American Cup where she placed fourth behind Ragan Smith, Asuka Teramoto, and Mélanie de Jesus dos Santos. She posted the highest uneven bars score of the day. She next competed at the DTB Pokal Team Challenge where she helped Germany finish second as a team behind Russia. In April Bui competed at the European Championships where she placed fifth in the all-around behind Ellie Downie, Zsófia Kovács, de Jesus dos Santos, and Elena Eremina. During the event finals she finished fifth on uneven bars and fourth on floor exercise.

At the German National Championships Bui finished third in the all-around and second on uneven bars and floor exercise. In August she competed at the 2017 Summer Universiade alongside Antonia Alicke, Leah Griesser, and Pauline Tratz. Together they placed fourth as a team. Individually Bui won silver on the uneven bars behind Daria Spiridonova.

At the German World Trials Bui only competed on uneven bars where she placed third. She was named to the team to compete at the World Championships alongside Elisabeth Seitz, Pauline Schäfer, and Tabea Alt. While there Bui did not qualify for any event finals.

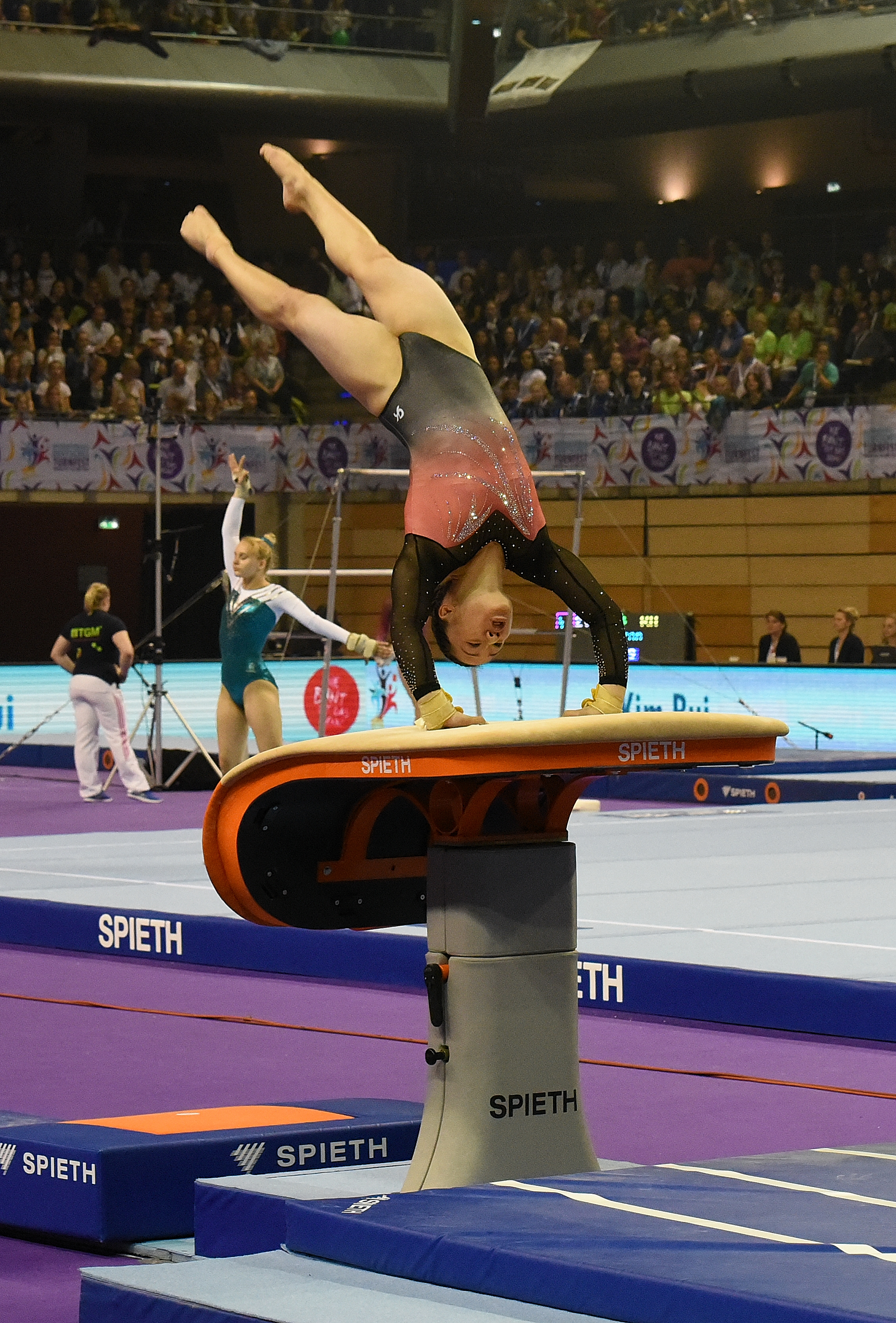
Vault

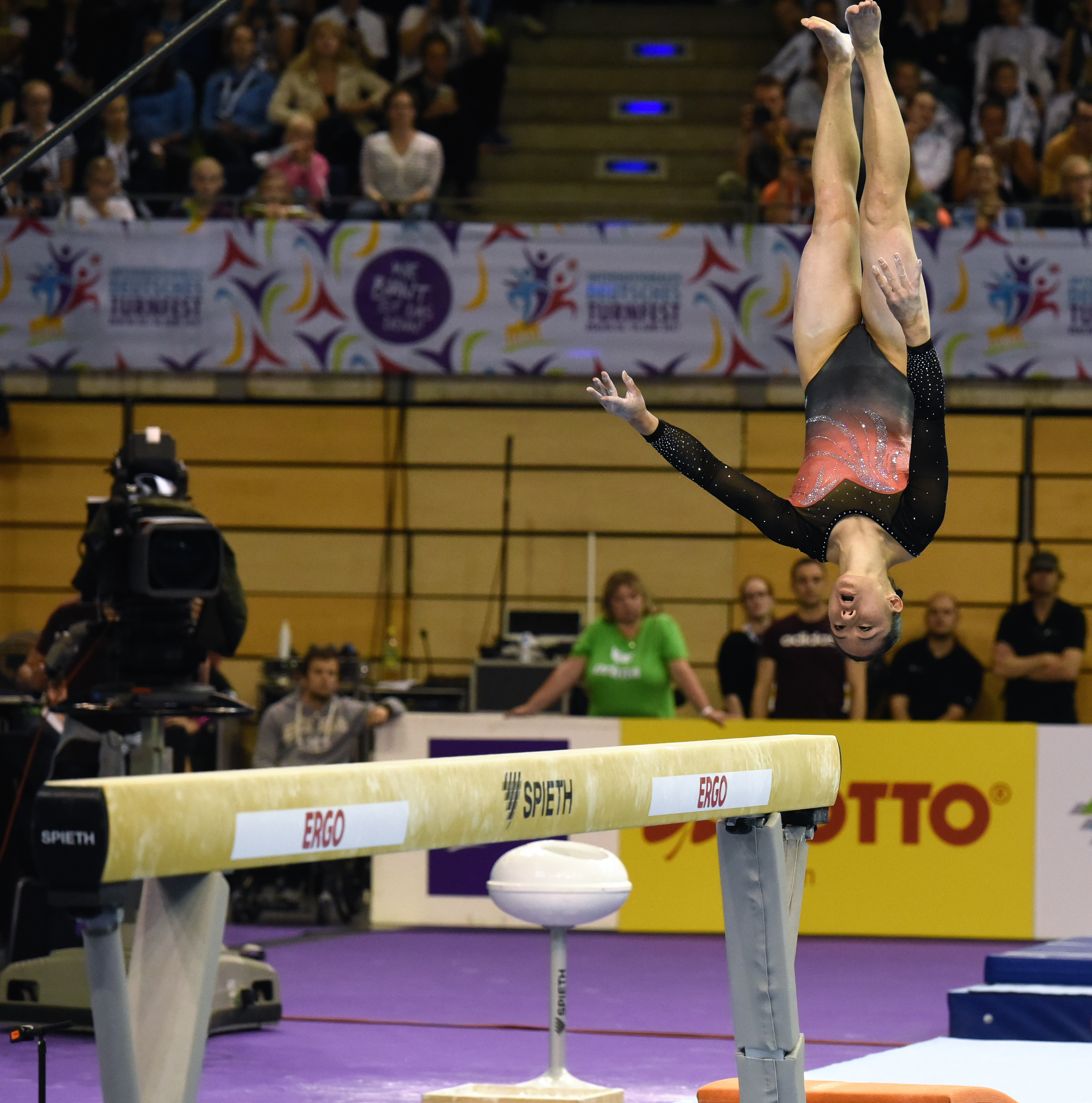
Balance Beam

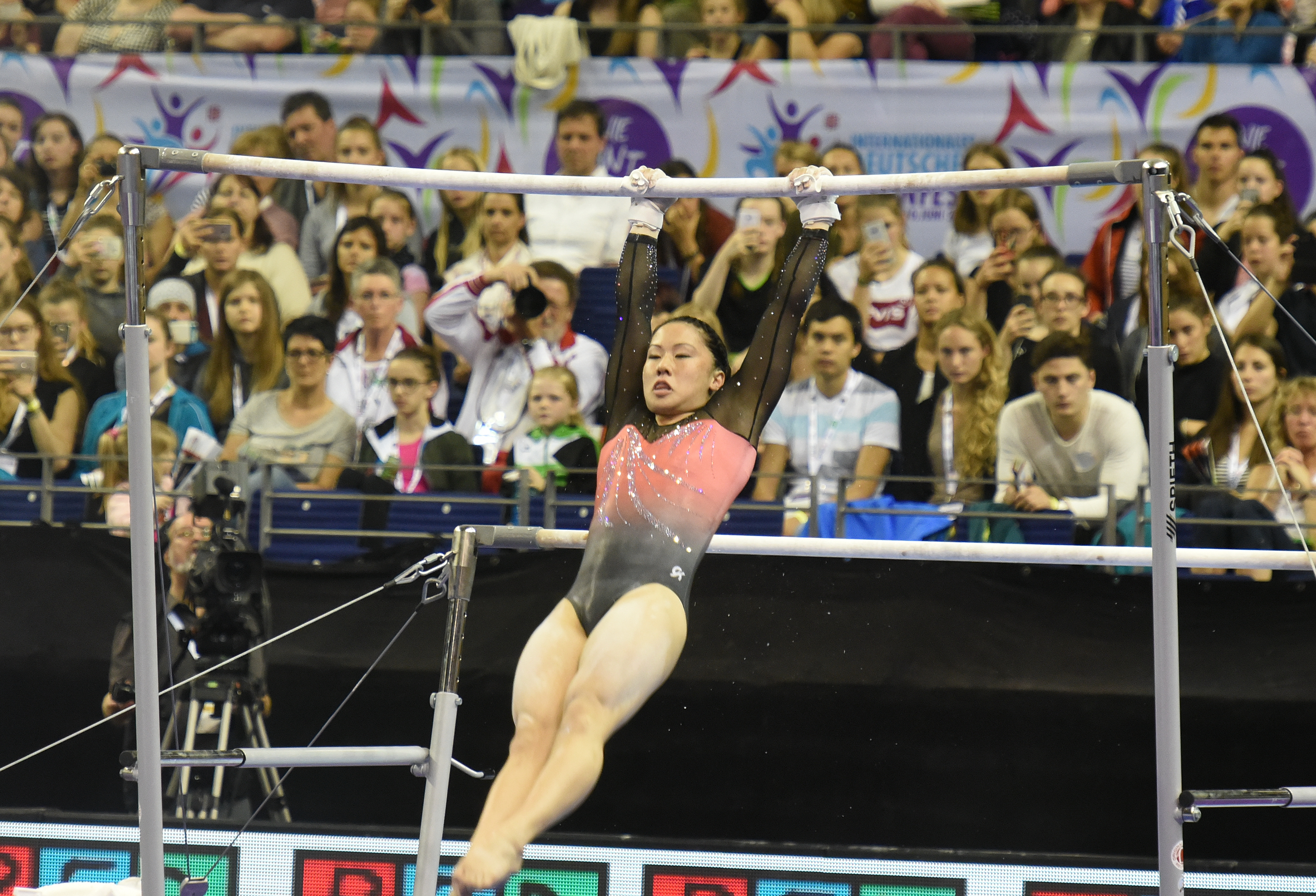
Uneven Bars

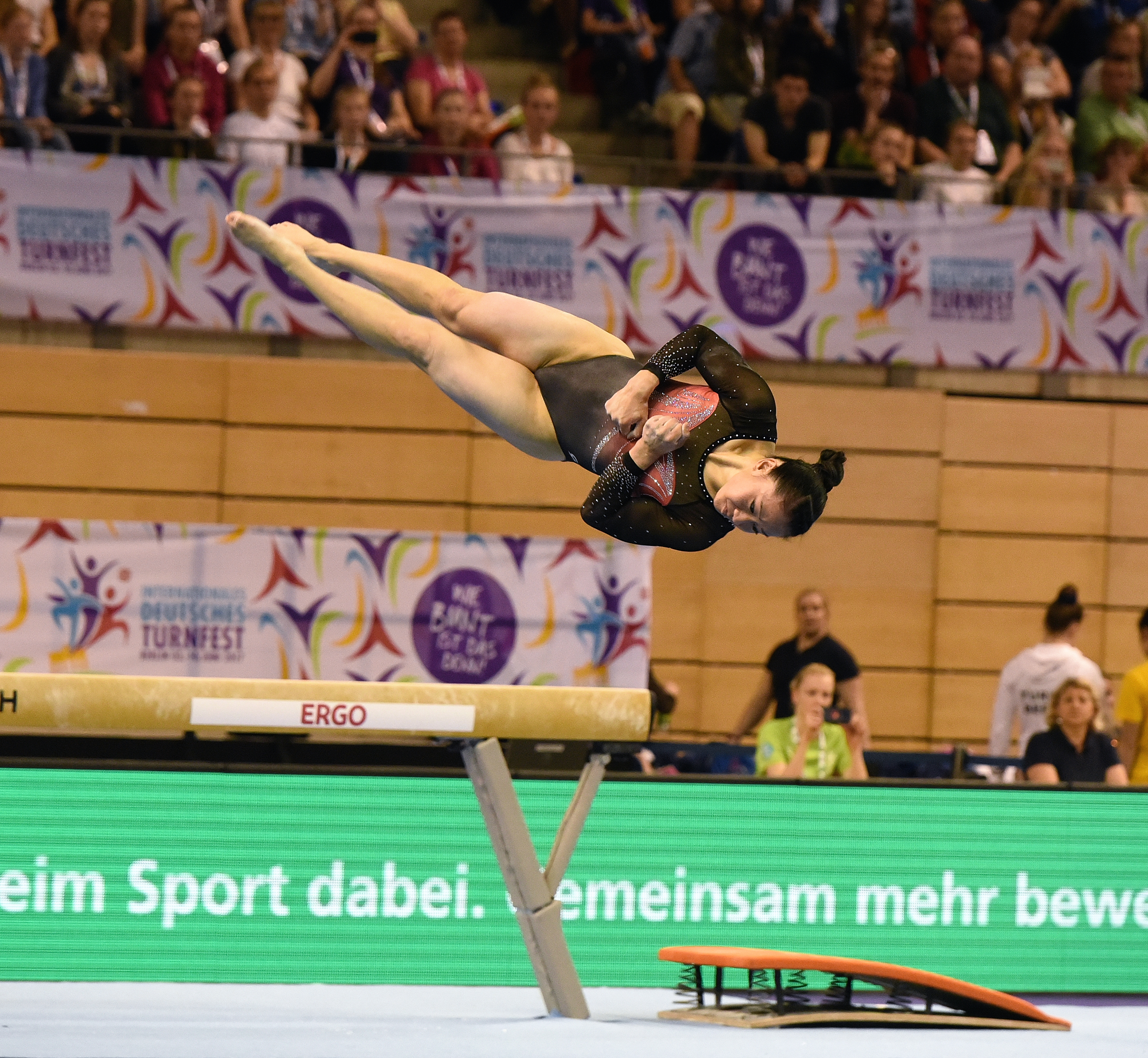
Floor Exercise

Bui at the 2017 International German Gymnastics Festival

=== 2018 ===
In March Bui competed at the DTB Pokal Team Challenge where she helped Germany finish fourth as a team. In June she competed at the German Euros trials where she finished fourth in the all-around. Bui competed at the Sainté Gym Cup where she helped Germany finish second as a team and individually she finished fourth in the all-around.

At the European Championships Bui, along with Leah Griesser, Emma Höfele, Pauline Schäfer, and Sarah Voss, finished 10th in qualification and therefore were the second reserve for the team final. Individually Bui finished fourth in the uneven bars final. In September Bui competed at the German World Trials where she finished first in the all-around. Later that month she competed at the German National Championships where she placed second in the all-around behind Seitz, second on uneven bars, and third on floor exercise. She next competed at the a friendly competition in Rüsselsheim where she helped Germany finish first and individually she also finished first.

In late October Bui competed at the World Championships alongside Seitz, Griesser, Scheder, and Voss. Together they finished eighth in the team final. Bui did not qualify for any event finals. She next competed at the Arthur Gander Memorial where she placed fifth. Bui ended the season competing at the Cottbus World Cup where she finished seventh on uneven bars and sixth on floor exercise.

=== 2019 ===
In March Bui competed at the American Cup where she placed fifth. She next competed at the Stuttgart World Cup where she placed seventh. Afterwards she competed at the Doha World Cup where she placed fifth on uneven bars and seventh on floor exercise.

In August Bui competed at the German National Championships where she placed second in the all-around behind Sarah Voss. Additionally she placed sixth on uneven bars and first on floor exercise. At the World Trials she finished second in the all-around behind Emelie Petz.

In September Bui was named to the team to compete at the 2019 World Championships in Stuttgart alongside Voss, Petz, Elisabeth Seitz, and Sophie Scheder (later replaced by Pauline Schäfer). Later that month she competed at a friendly competition in Worms, Germany where she helped Germany finish first ahead of Belgium, France, and a mixed team.

At the World Championships Bui competed on vault, uneven bars, and floor exercise during qualification and helped Germany place ninth as a team. Although they did not qualify to the team final, they qualified a team to the 2020 Olympic Games in Tokyo. Individually Bui did not qualify to any event finals.

Bui ended the season competing at the Cottbus World Cup. While there she qualified to both the uneven bars and floor exercise finals. In the uneven bars final she finished in fifth place; for the floor exercise final she won the silver medal behind Ukrainian Anastasia Bachynska.

=== 2021 ===
In April Bui competed at the European Championships in Basel, Switzerland. She qualified to the all-around and floor exercise finals, placing seventh and sixth respectively. During the all-around final Bui and compatriot Elisabeth Seitz wore unitards opposed to the standard leotard that is common in women's artistic gymnastics. While unitards are usually worn for religious reasons, the German gymnasts opted to wear them as a statement "against sexualization in gymnastics".

On 13 June Bui was selected to represent Germany at the 2020 Summer Olympics alongside Elisabeth Seitz, Sarah Voss, and Pauline Schäfer. In qualifications at the Olympic Games Germany finished ninth as a team and did not advance to the finals. However Bui advanced to the all-around final, her first individual Olympic final.

=== 2022 ===
In June, Bui competed at the German Championships, where she won the gold in the uneven bars and floor exercise finals, and took the silver in the all-around behind Sarah Voss.

In August, Bui announced that she would retire following the European Championships in Munich. On the first day of competition, she finished eighth in the all-around, and helped Germany qualify to the team final in fourth place. Individually, she also qualified to the uneven bars final in fourth place. In the team final, the German team of Bui, Emma Malewski, Pauline Schäfer, Elisabeth Seitz and Sarah Voss won the bronze medal behind Italy and Great Britain — Germany's first team medal in European Championship history. In the uneven bars final, Bui finished fifth, scoring a 14.066 for the last routine of her career.

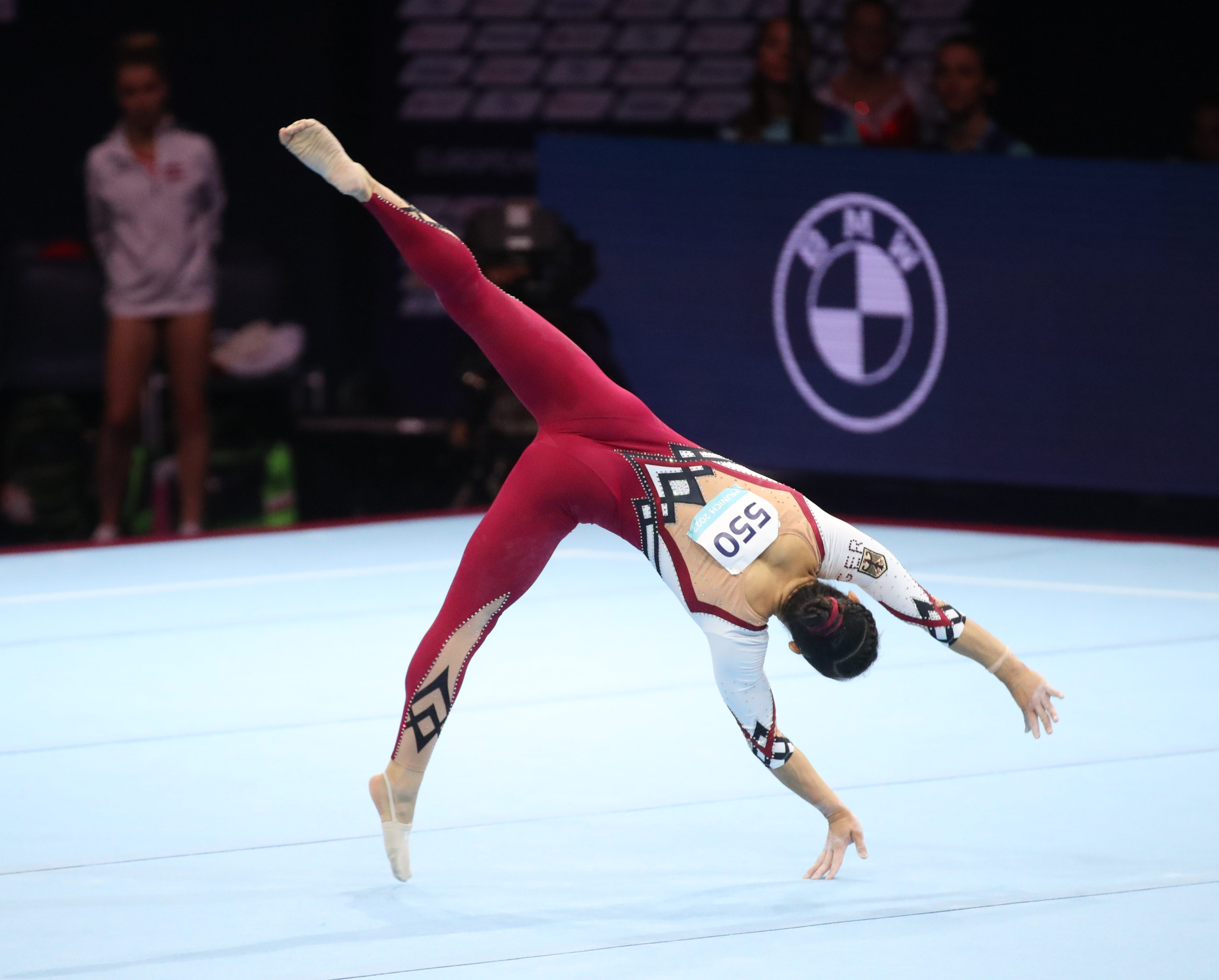
Floor exercise (qualifications)

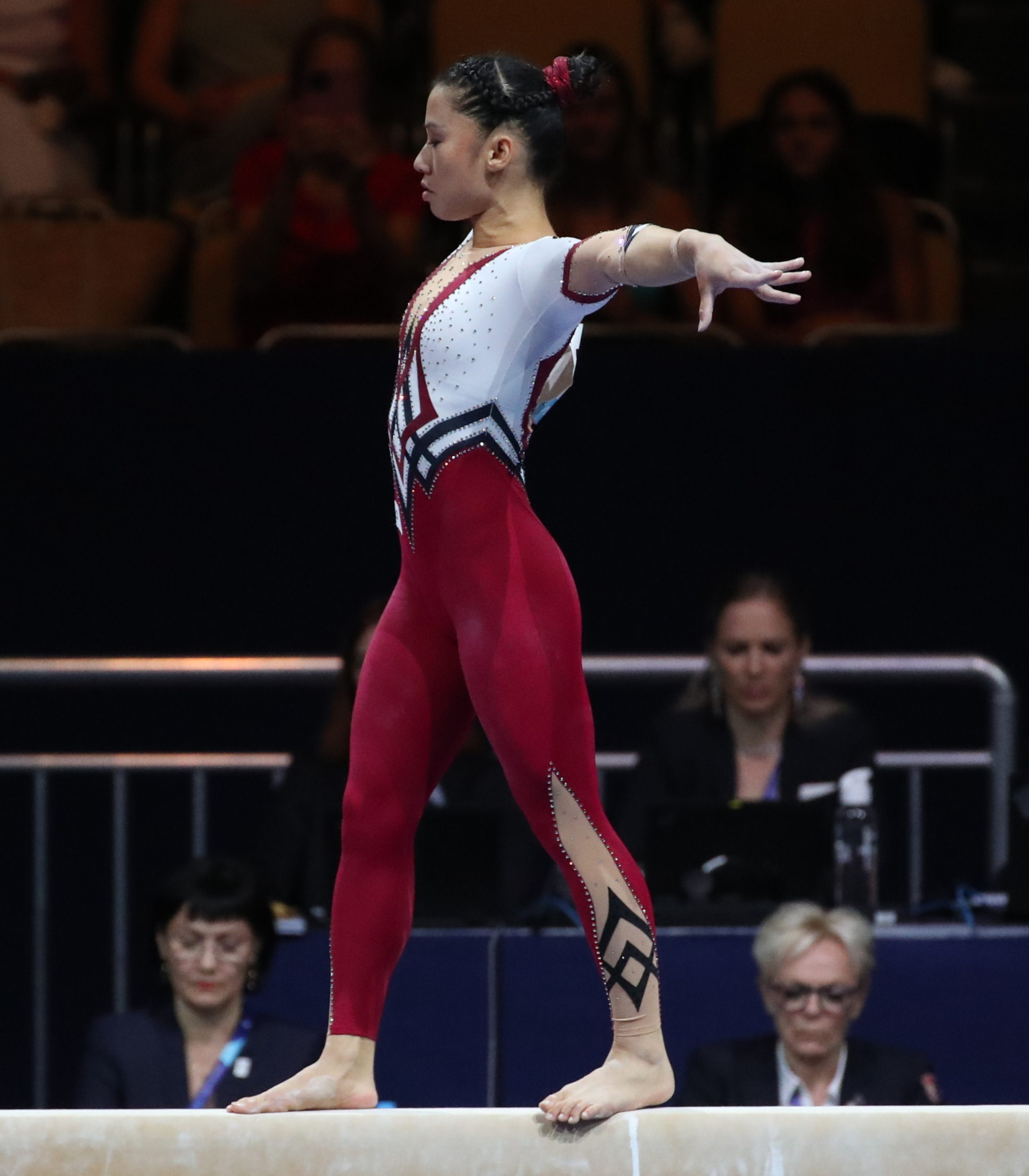
Balance beam (qualifications)

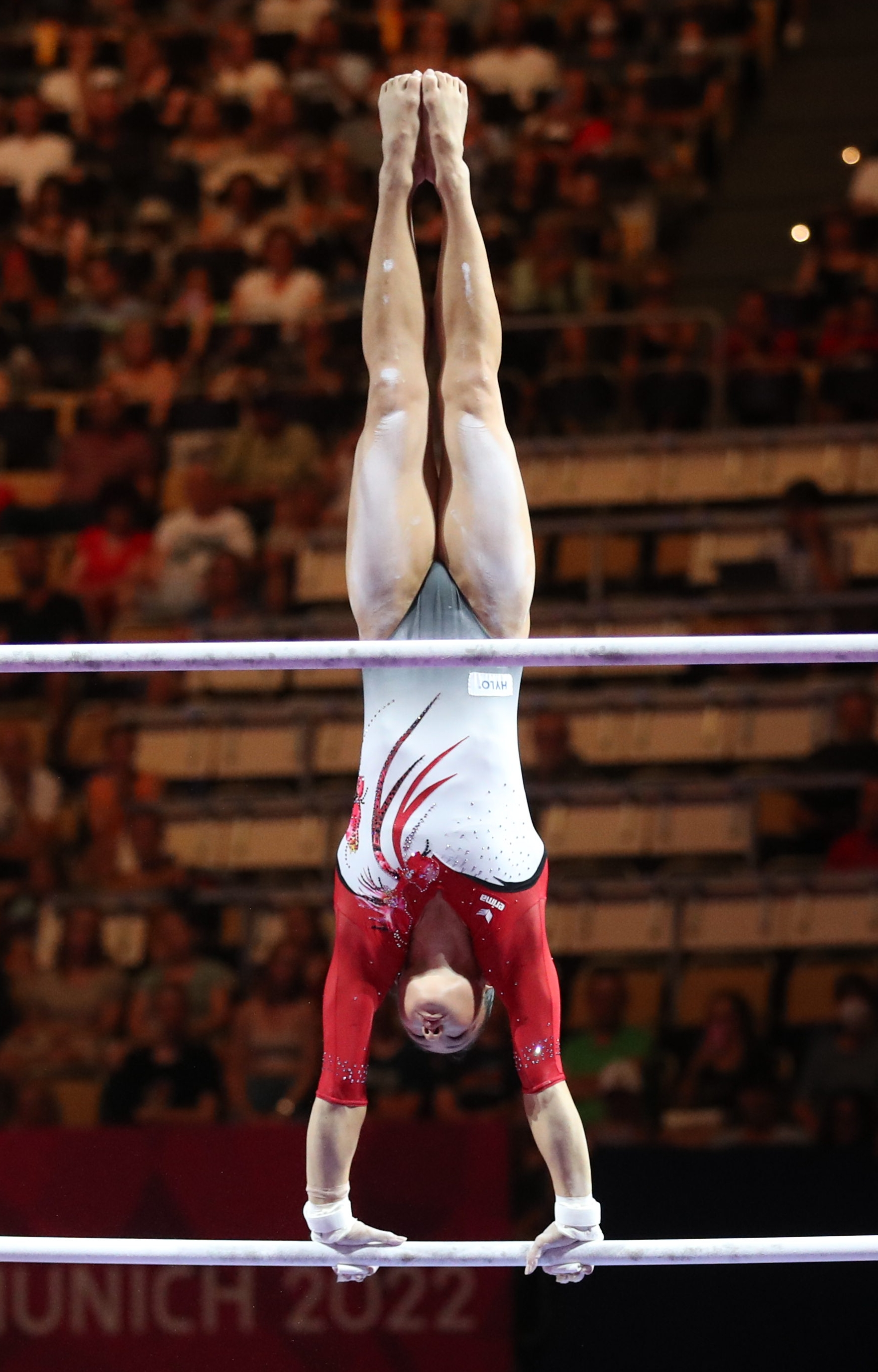
Uneven bars final

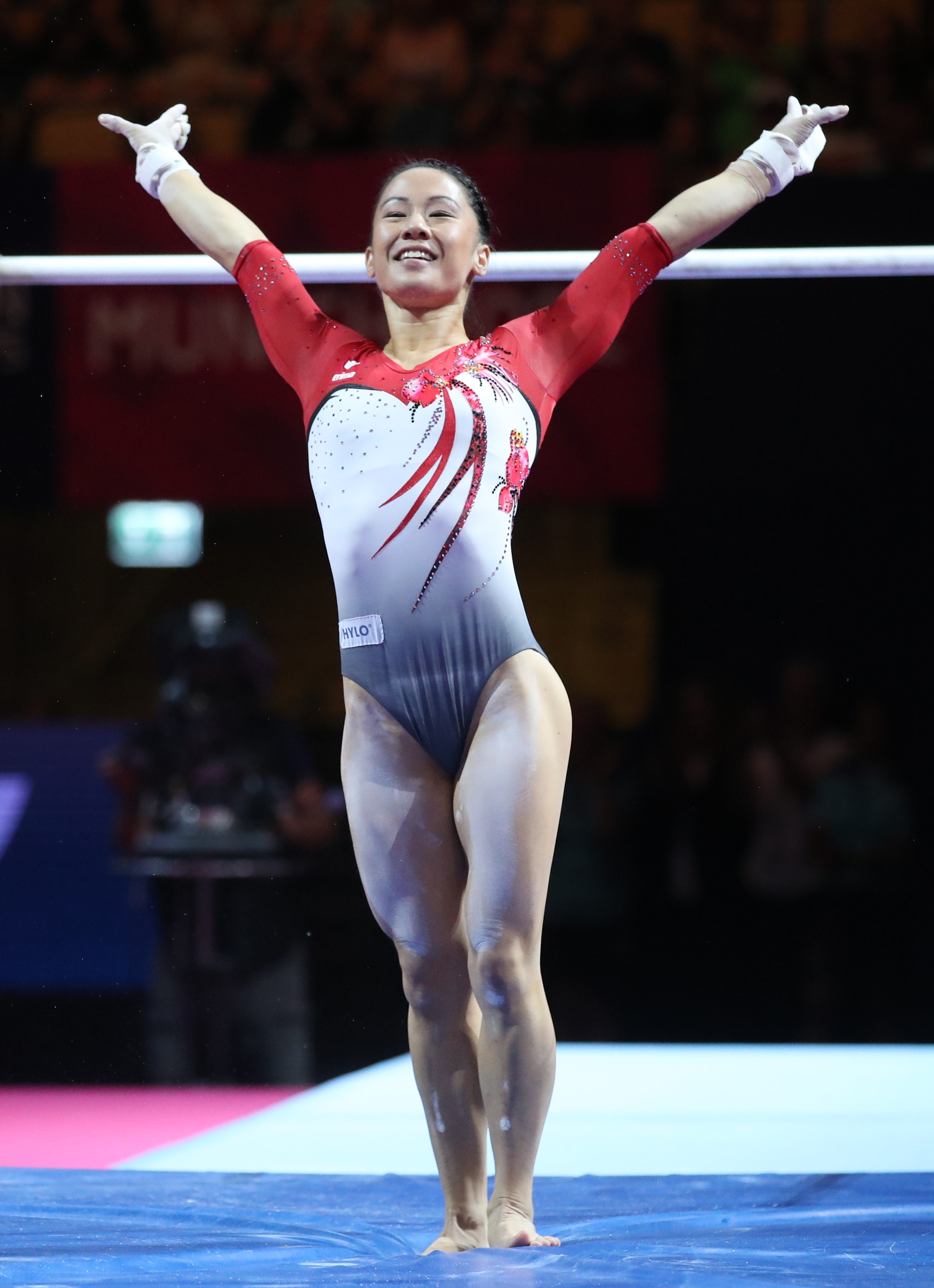
Uneven bars final

Bui competing at the 2022 European Championships; the final competition of her career

== Personal health ==
Kim Bui and Miriam Neureuther hosted the German documentary movie Hungern für Gold (2023, Starving for gold). Both talked about their own eating disorders and interviewed several people like Kim Buis parents and ski jumpers Sven Hannawald and Maren Lundby. Kim Bui herself suffered from bulimia. In 2023 she also published a book about her experiences.

== Competitive history ==
Competitive history of Kim Bui
| Year | Event | Team | AA | VT | UB | BB | FX |
|---|---|---|---|---|---|---|---|
| 2005 | National Championships | | 4 | | | | |
| 2005 | Leverkusen Cup | 1st place, gold medalist(s) | 5 | 3rd place, bronze medalist(s) | 5 | 17 | 3rd place, bronze medalist(s) |
| 2005 | World Championships | | R4 | | | | |
2006
| 2006 | European Championships | R3 | | | | | |
| 2006 | National Championships | | 2nd place, silver medalist(s) | 2nd place, silver medalist(s) | 4 | 2nd place, silver medalist(s) | 1st place, gold medalist(s) |
2007
| 2007 | European Championships | | | | R2 | | |
| 2007 | Cottbus World Cup | | | | | | 6 |
| 2007 | Glasgow Grand Prix | | | 4 | | | 6 |
| 2008 | National Championships | | | 1st place, gold medalist(s) | 2nd place, silver medalist(s) | | 1st place, gold medalist(s) |
| 2008 | Glasgow Grand Prix | | | 2nd place, silver medalist(s) | 3rd place, bronze medalist(s) | | 5 |
| 2008 | Stuttgart World Cup | | | 5 | 5 | | 3rd place, bronze medalist(s) |
| 2009 | American Cup | | 3rd place, bronze medalist(s) | | | | |
| 2009 | Cottbus World Cup | | | 4 | 7 | | 2nd place, silver medalist(s) |
| 2009 | European Championships | | 16 | 5 | | | |
| 2009 | German Championships | | 1st place, gold medalist(s) | 1st place, gold medalist(s) | 2nd place, silver medalist(s) | 3rd place, bronze medalist(s) | 1st place, gold medalist(s) |
| 2009 | World Championships | | 23 | | | | |
| 2009 | Stuttgart World Cup | | | 3rd place, bronze medalist(s) | 1st place, gold medalist(s) | | 2nd place, silver medalist(s) |
| 2011 | Cottbus World Cup | | | | 3rd place, bronze medalist(s) | | |
| 2011 | European Championships | | | | 3rd place, bronze medalist(s) | | |
| 2011 | German Championships | | 2nd place, silver medalist(s) | 4 | 4 | 4 | 3rd place, bronze medalist(s) |
| 2011 | SUI-GER-ROU Friendly | 2nd place, silver medalist(s) | | | | | |
| 2011 | World Championships | 6 | | | | | |
| 2011 | Stuttgart World Cup | | 2nd place, silver medalist(s) | | | | |
| 2011 | Tokyo World Cup | | 3rd place, bronze medalist(s) | | | | |
| 2012 | Cottbus World Cup | | | | | 4 | 3rd place, bronze medalist(s) |
| 2012 | GER-GBR-ROU Friendly | 2nd place, silver medalist(s) | | | | | |
| 2012 | German Championships | | 3rd place, bronze medalist(s) | | 3rd place, bronze medalist(s) | 3rd place, bronze medalist(s) | 2nd place, silver medalist(s) |
| 2012 | Olympic Games | R1 | | | | | |
| 2012 | Swiss Cup | 3rd place, bronze medalist(s) | | | | | |
| 2012 | Stuttgart World Cup | | 4 | | | | |
| 2012 | Glasgow World Cup | | 3rd place, bronze medalist(s) | | | | |
| 2013 | National Championships | | 3rd place, bronze medalist(s) | 1st place, gold medalist(s) | | | 2nd place, silver medalist(s) |
| 2013 | Anadia World Cup | | | 4 | 6 | 5 | 4 |
| 2013 | Summer Universiade | 3rd place, bronze medalist(s) | 3rd place, bronze medalist(s) | 8 | 4 | | 4 |
| 2013 | Arthur Gander Memorial | | 4 | | | | |
| 2013 | Stuttgart World Cup | 3rd place, bronze medalist(s) | | | | | |
| 2014 | Cottbus World Cup | | | 2nd place, silver medalist(s) | 4 | | 2nd place, silver medalist(s) |
| 2014 | Tokyo World Cup | | 7 | | | | |
| 2014 | European Championships | 4 | | 7 | 7 | | |
| 2014 | National Championships | | 1st place, gold medalist(s) | 3rd place, bronze medalist(s) | 2nd place, silver medalist(s) | 5 | 1st place, gold medalist(s) |
| 2014 | Länderkampf Kunstturnen | 1st place, gold medalist(s) | 4 | | | | |
| 2014 | World Championships | R1 | R4 | | | | |
| 2014 | Stuttgart World Cup | | 3rd place, bronze medalist(s) | | | | |
| 2016 | São Paulo World Cup | | | | 2nd place, silver medalist(s) | 6 | 2nd place, silver medalist(s) |
| 2016 | European Championships | 7 | | | 4 | | |
| 2016 | German Championships | | 4 | | 3rd place, bronze medalist(s) | 5 | 2nd place, silver medalist(s) |
| 2016 | Olympic Trials | | 3rd place, bronze medalist(s) | | | | |
| 2016 | Chemnitz Friendly | 1st place, gold medalist(s) | 7 | | | | |
| 2016 | Olympic Games | 6 | | | | | |
| 2016 | Swiss Cup | 2nd place, silver medalist(s) | | | | | |
| 2017 | American Cup | | 4 | | | | |
| 2017 | DTB Pokal Team Challenge | 2nd place, silver medalist(s) | | | | | |
| 2017 | European Championships | | 5 | | 5 | | 4 |
| 2017 | German Championships | | 3rd place, bronze medalist(s) | | 2nd place, silver medalist(s) | | 2nd place, silver medalist(s) |
| 2017 | Summer Universiade | 4 | | | 2nd place, silver medalist(s) | | |
| 2017 | World Trials | | 2nd place, silver medalist(s) | | | | |
| 2018 | DTB Pokal Team Challenge | 4 | | | | | |
| 2018 | Euro Trials | | 4 | | | | |
| 2018 | Sainté Gym Cup | 2nd place, silver medalist(s) | 4 | | | | |
| 2018 | European Championships | R2 | | | 4 | | |
| 2018 | World Trials | | 1st place, gold medalist(s) | | | | |
| 2018 | German Championships | | 2nd place, silver medalist(s) | | 2nd place, silver medalist(s) | | 3rd place, bronze medalist(s) |
| 2018 | Rüsselsheim Friendly | 1st place, gold medalist(s) | 1st place, gold medalist(s) | | | | |
| 2018 | World Championships | 8 | | | | | |
| 2018 | Arthur Gander Memorial | | 5 | | | | |
| 2018 | Cottbus World Cup | | | | 7 | | 6 |
| 2019 | American Cup | | 5 | | | | |
| 2019 | Stuttgart World Cup | | 7 | | | | |
| 2019 | Doha World Cup | | | | 5 | | 7 |
| 2019 | German Championships | | 2nd place, silver medalist(s) | | 7 | | 1st place, gold medalist(s) |
| 2019 | German World Trials | | 3rd place, bronze medalist(s) | | | | |
| 2019 | Worms Friendly | 1st place, gold medalist(s) | | | | | |
| 2019 | World Championships | R1 | | | | | |
| 2019 | Cottbus World Cup | | | | 5 | | 2nd place, silver medalist(s) |
2021
| 2021 | European Championships | | 7 | | | | 6 |
| 2021 | German Championships | | 4 | | 1st place, gold medalist(s) | | |
| 2021 | Olympic Games | R1 | 17 | | | | |
| 2021 | Swiss Cup | 9 | | | | | |
| 2022 | German Championships | | 2nd place, silver medalist(s) | | 1st place, gold medalist(s) | 4 | 1st place, gold medalist(s) |
| 2022 | European Championships | 3rd place, bronze medalist(s) | 8 | | 5 | | |

== Bibliography ==
- Kim Bui, Andreas Matlé: 45 Sekunden. Meine Leidenschaft fürs Turnen – und warum es nicht alles im Leben ist: Ein Plädoyer für menschlicheren Leistungssport. Edel Sports, Hamburg 2023, ISBN 978-3-98588-024-9

== Filmography ==
- Hungern für Gold, 2023 (documentary)
