= Pauline Schäfer =

German artistic gymnast

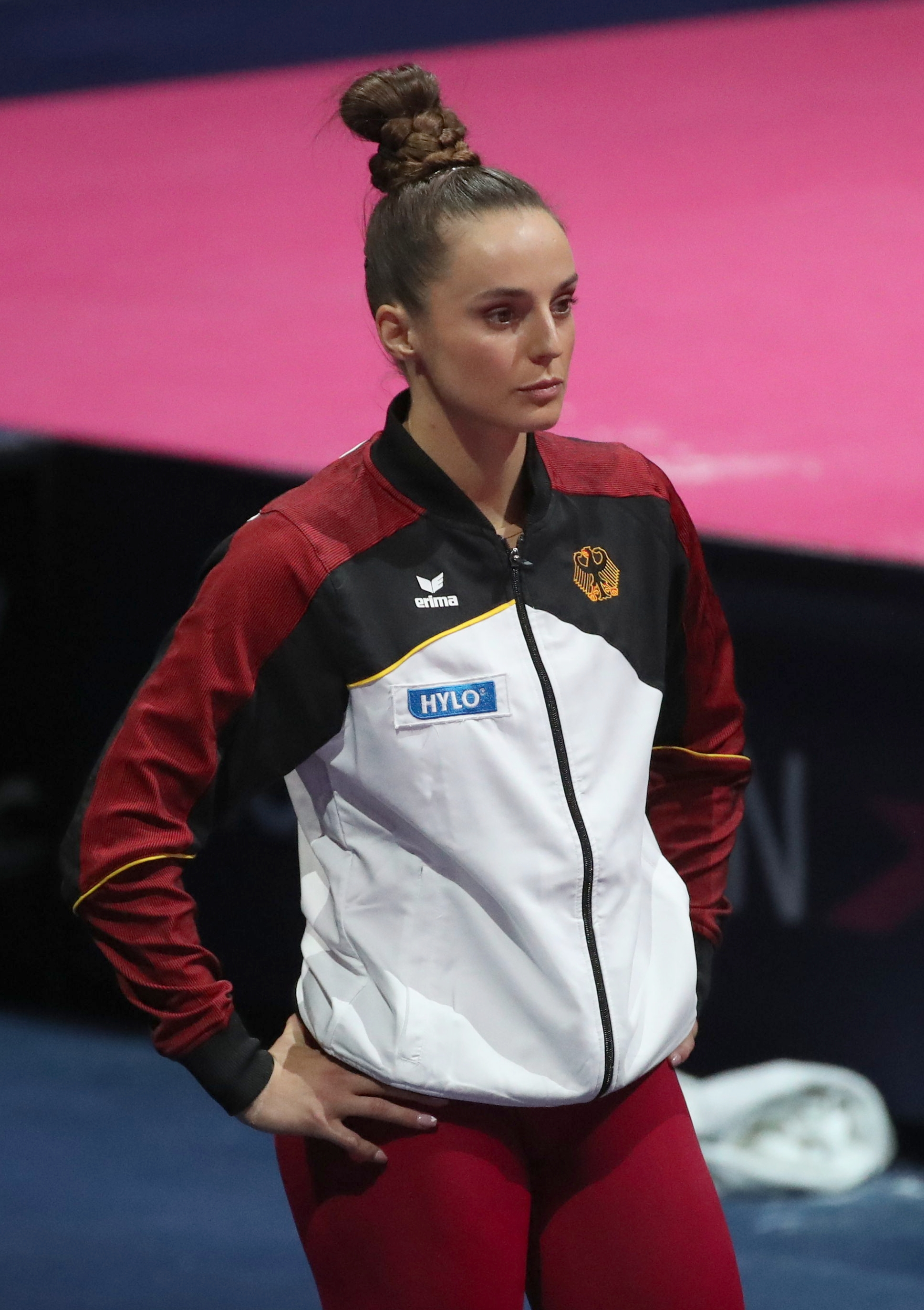
- Schäfer at the 2022 European Championships

Personal information
- Full name: Pauline Sieglinde Schäfer-Betz
- Born: 4 January 1997 (age 29) Saarbrücken, Germany
- Height: 162 cm (5 ft 4 in)

Gymnastics career
- Discipline: Women's artistic gymnastics
- Country represented: Germany (2012–present)
- Club: KTV Chemnitz
- Head coaches: Tatjana Bachmayer, Anatol Ashurkov
- Former coaches: Gabriele Frehse, Kay-Uwe Temme
- Eponymous skills: Schäfer (E) (balance beam): side somersault with a half twist
Medal record
Women's artistic gymnastics
Representing Germany
World Championships
Gold medal – first place	2017 Montreal	Balance beam
Silver medal – second place	2021 Kitakyushu	Balance beam
Bronze medal – third place	2015 Glasgow	Balance beam
European Championships
Bronze medal – third place	2022 Munich	Team

Pauline Sieglinde Schäfer-Betz or Pauline Schäfer (born 4 January 1997) is a German artistic gymnast who represented Germany at the 2016, 2020, and 2024 Summer Olympics. She is the 2017 World Champion, the 2021 World silver medalist, and the 2015 World bronze medalist on the balance beam. She was part of the bronze medal-winning German team at the 2022 European Championships.

== Personal life ==
Schäfer was born in 1997 in Saarbrücken, Saarland. She has one younger sister Helene and two older brothers. She began gymnastics at five years old at TV Pflugscheid-Hixberg. In 2012, she moved from Bierbach an der Blies to the boarding school Sportgymnasium Chemnitz.

== Gymnastics career ==
Schäfer competed at the 2012 Junior European Championships with the German team that placed fifth.

=== 2013 ===
Schäfer turned senior in 2013 and made her international debut at the Cottbus World Cup in March. During qualifications, she placed nineteenth on balance beam and ninth on vault, making her the first reserve for the vault final. Later that month she competed at the Chemnitz Friendly where she was on a mixed team with compatriot Carina Kröll and Americans Amelia Hundley and Brenna Dowell. They finished fourth as a team. In the all-around, Schäfer finished in eighth place. The following month, Schäfer competed at the Ljubljana World Cup. During qualifications, she placed fourteenth on vault, twelfth on floor, and ninth on balance beam and therefore did not advance to any event finals. In May, she competed at her first German National Championships as a senior elite gymnast. She finished fourth in the all-around behind Elisabeth Seitz, Lisa Katharina Hill, and Kim Bui. During event finals she finished fourth on vault, third on balance beam, and sixth on floor exercise. She then competed at the World Championships, but she did not qualify for any event finals.

=== 2014 ===
Schäfer started the season competing at a friendly competition in Munich where she helped Germany place second behind Great Britain. Individually, she placed sixth in the all-around. She was later selected to compete at the European Championships alongside Kim Bui, Çağla Akyol, Sophie Scheder, and Janine Berger. Together they finished fourth in the team final. In August, she competed at the German National Championships where she placed second in the all-around and on floor exercise behind Bui, first on vault and balance beam, and sixth on uneven bars. The following month, Schäfer competed at the Länderkampf Kunstturnen, a friendly competition, where Germany defeated Romania and Switzerland. Individually, Schäfer finished third in the all-around behind Larisa Iordache and Giulia Steingruber.

In October, Schäfer represented Germany at the 2014 World Championships alongside Bui, Akyol, Lisa Katharina Hill, Elisabeth Seitz, and Scheder. Together they finished ninth during qualifications and were the first reserve for the team final. Although she didn't qualify for any individual finals, Schäfer successfully performed a new element, a sideways salto tucked with ½ turn (180°) take off from one leg to side stand, which was therefore named after her in the Code of Points. In November, Schäfer competed at the DTB Team Challenge where she helped Germany finish first as a team. Individually, she finished second on vault and floor exercise behind Ksenia Afanasyeva, fourth on uneven bars, but won gold on the balance beam. She ended the season competing at the Glasgow World Cup where she finished eighth.

=== 2015 ===
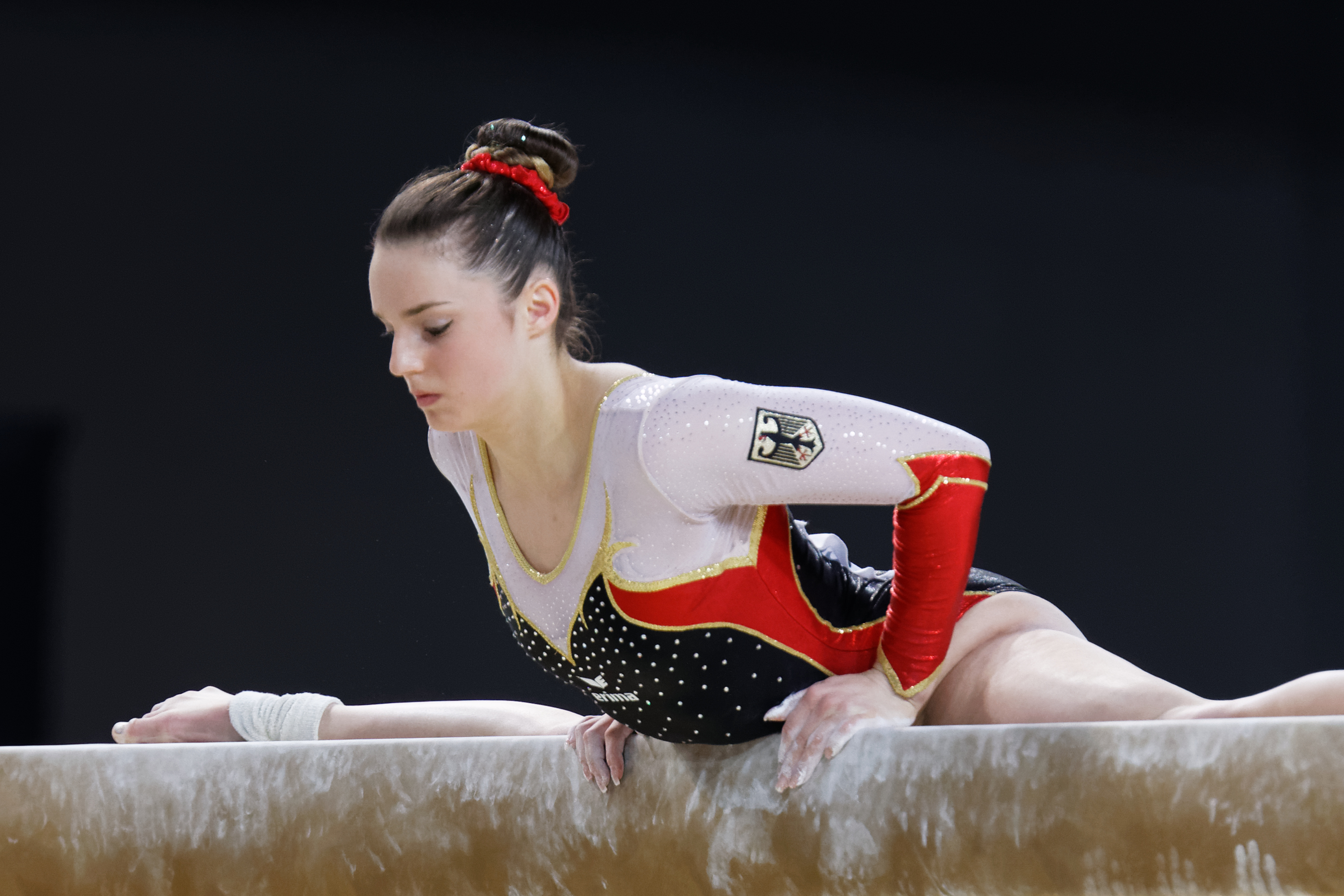
Schäfer at the 2015 European Championships

Schäfer began the season competing at the Cottbus World Cup where she only competed on balance beam and placed tenth in qualifications. She was later selected to compete at the European Championships. While there, she qualified for the balance beam final where she placed seventh. In May, she competed at the Flanders International Team Challenge where she helped Germany place first as a team, and individually, she placed fifth in the all-around. In September, she competed at the German National Championships where she placed second in the all-around behind Elisabeth Seitz. She placed first on vault and balance beam, fifth on floor exercise, and sixth on uneven bars. She next competed at the German World Trials where she placed third behind Seitz and Sophie Scheder.

Schäfer was selected to represent Germany at the World Championships alongside Seitz, Scheder, Leah Griesser, Lisa Katharina Hill, and Pauline Tratz. During qualifications, they placed 12th and did not advance to the team final. However, Schäfer placed 13th in the all-around and eighth on the balance beam and qualified for both finals. During the all-around final Schäfer ended up placing 19th. During the balance beam final, Schäfer performed a clean routine and won the bronze medal behind Simone Biles and Sanne Wevers, Germany's first beam medal in over 30 years. In November, she competed at the Arthur Gander Memorial where she won the silver medal in three-event all-around behind Larisa Iordache. She ended the season competing at the Swiss Cup. In this mixed pairs event, she was partnered with Andreas Bretschneider. Together they finished third behind the Ukrainian team of Angelina Kysla and Oleg Verniaiev and the Romanian team of Iordache and Marius Berbecar.

=== 2016 ===
In March, Schäfer competed at the German National Team Cup where she finished first in the all-around. She next competed at the Stuttgart World Cup where she finished fifth after grabbing the beam. In April, she competed at the Olympic Test Event where she helped Germany place second behind Brazil and qualify a team to the Olympic Games. Individually, she placed sixth on the balance beam and fifth on the floor exercise. In June, Schäfer competed at the German National Championships where she placed third in the all-around behind Sophie Scheder and Elisabeth Seitz. She won gold on both the balance beam and floor exercise. The following month she competed at the Olympic Trials where she placed fourth and was named to the team alongside Seitz, Scheder, Kim Bui, and Tabea Alt. She next competed at a friendly competition in Chemnitz where Germany finished in first, and individually, Schäfer finished second behind Giulia Steingruber.

At the 2016 Olympic Games in Rio de Janeiro, during qualifications Schäfer competed on vault, balance beam, and floor exercise and helped Germany qualify to the team final for the first time since German reunification. During the team final Schäfer once again contributed on vault, balance beam, and floor exercise towards Germany's sixth-place finish.

=== 2017 ===
Schäfer competed at the German National Team Cup where she finished second behind Tabea Alt. She next competed at the Stuttgart World Cup where she placed fourth behind Alt, Angelina Melnikova, and Morgan Hurd. In April, Schäfer competed at the European Championships alongside Alt, Elisabeth Seitz, and Kim Bui. She qualified for the all-around and floor exercise finals. In the all-around final, she placed 20th, and in the floor exercise final, she placed sixth. In June, she competed at the German National Championships where she placed second in the all-around behind Seitz, fourth on uneven bars and balance beam, and won gold on floor exercise. Then in September, she competed at the German World Trials where was named to the team alongside Bui, Seitz, and Alt.

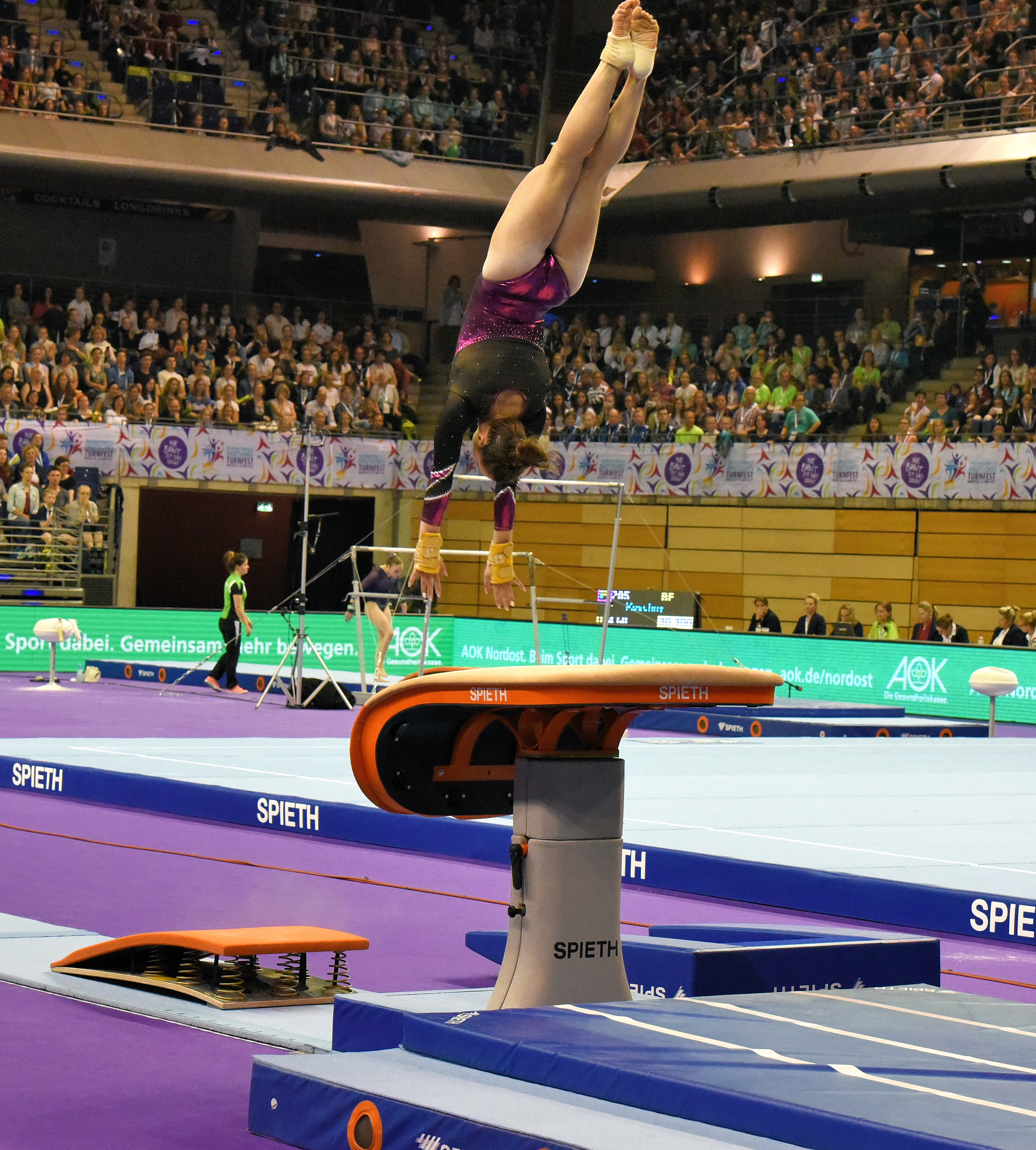
Vault

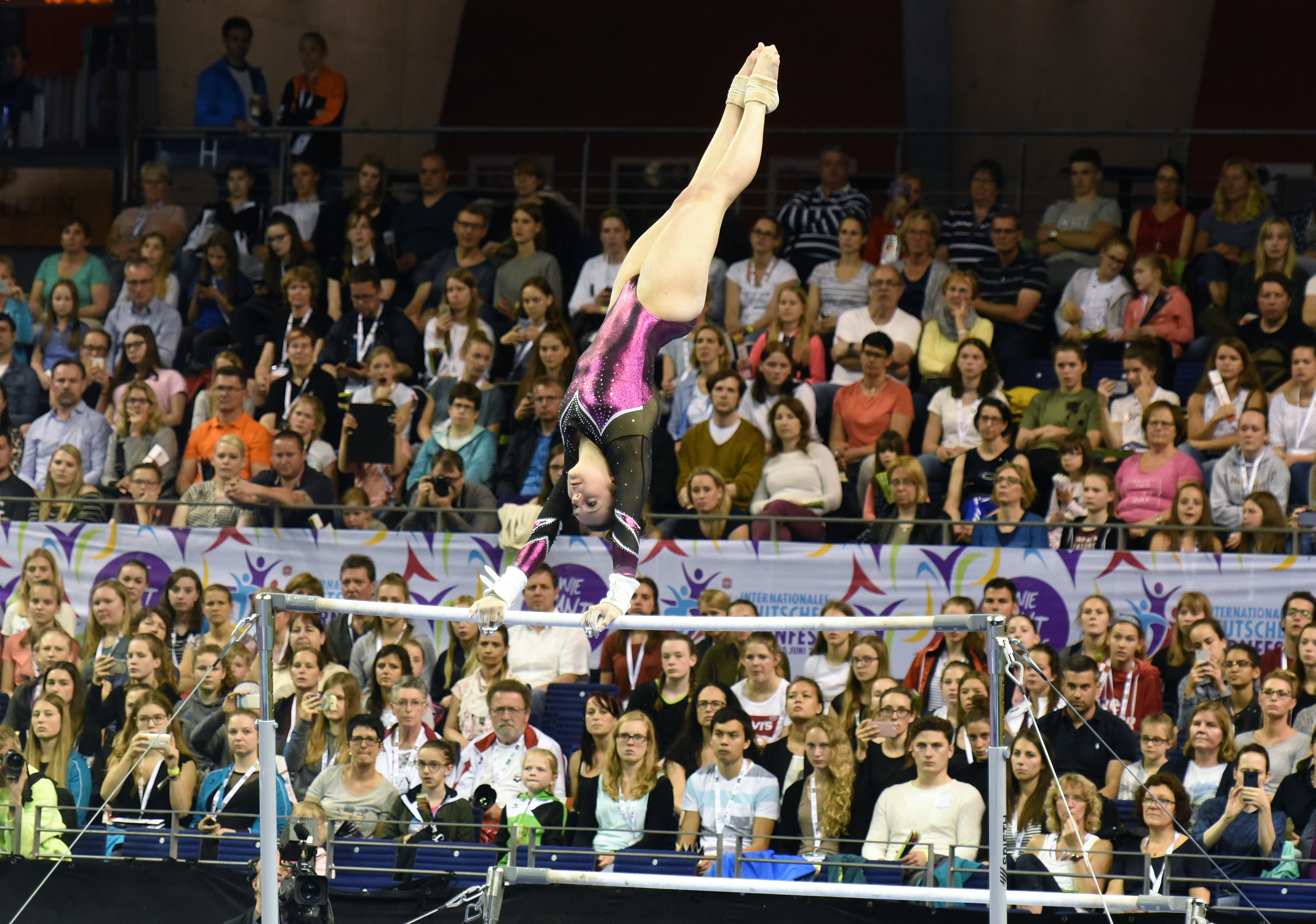
Uneven Bars

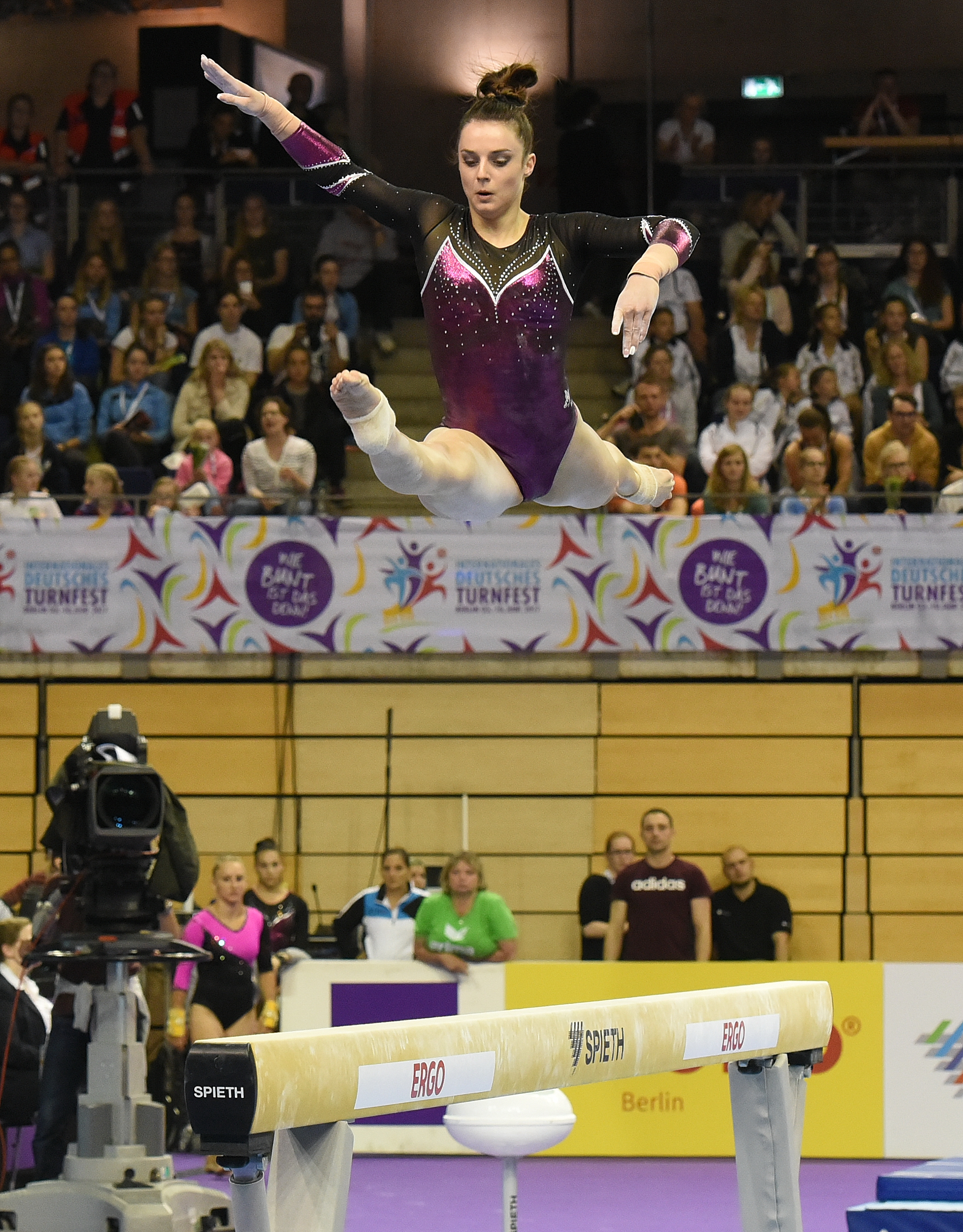
Balance Beam

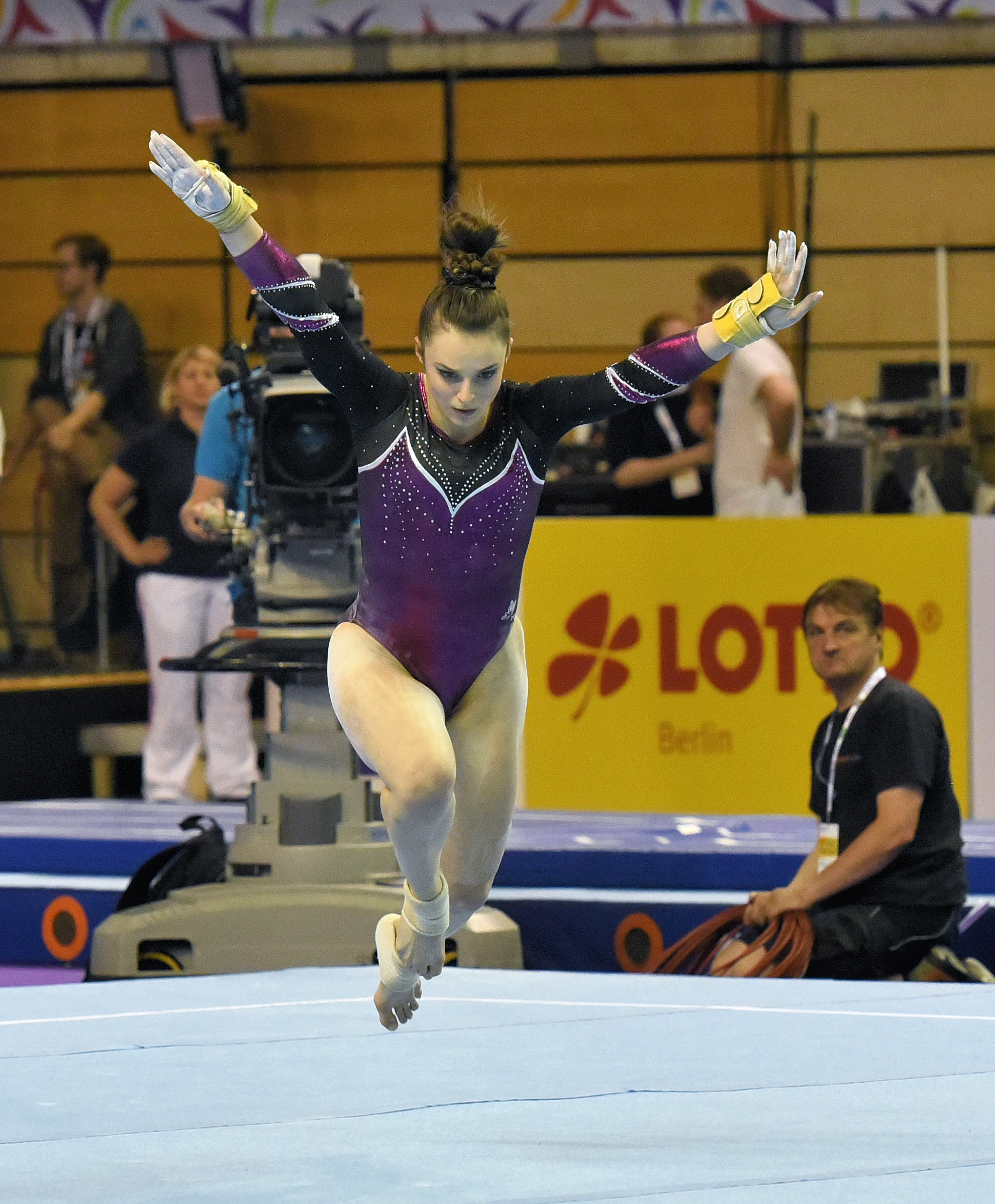
Floor Exercise

Schäfer at the 2017 German Championships

At the World Championships, Schäfer only competed on balance beam and floor exercise during qualifications. She finished 22nd on floor exercise but third on the balance beam and therefore qualified for the event final alongside compatriot Alt. During qualifications, Schäfer was the only gymnast to receive an execution score higher than 8 on the balance beam. During the event final, Schäfer was once again the only gymnast to receive an execution score higher than 8, and she ended up winning the gold medal on the apparatus ahead of Hurd and Alt. This was Germany's first women's gold medal at a World Championships since German reunification. She ended the season competing at the Cottbus World Cup where she placed second on balance beam behind Wang Cenyu and third on floor exercise behind Lilia Akhaimova and Maria Kharenkova.

=== 2018 ===
In June, Schäfer competed at the German European Championships Trials where she placed first in the all-around and was named to the team alongside Kim Bui, Sarah Voss, Leah Griesser, and Emma Höfele. The following month Schäfer competed at the Sainté Gym Cup where she placed third in the all-around behind Mélanie de Jesus dos Santos and Lorette Charpy. Additionally, Germany placed second behind France in the team competition.

At the European Championships she qualified for the balance beam final in second place behind Nina Derwael of Belgium. The German team did not qualify for the team final. During the balance beam final, Schäfer fell off the apparatus while performing her eponymous skill and finished sixth. In September, she competed at the German World Trials where she only competed on uneven bars, balance beam, and floor exercise – on which she fell and injured her ankle. Later that month, Schäfer competed at the German National Championships but only competed on uneven bars due to her injury. While she was in contention for the team to compete at the World Championships, Schäfer decided to withdraw due to her bone marrow edema holding her back from being able to compete at the necessary level for the World Championships.

=== 2019 ===
Schäfer returned to competition in March where she competed at the DTB Team Challenge, but she only competed on vault and uneven bars. In April, she competed at the European Championships. During qualifications, she only competed on the balance beam and uneven bars. She qualified for the balance beam final in second place behind Giorgia Villa. During the event finals, she fell off the apparatus and finished in sixth place. In August, she competed at the German National Championships where she placed sixth in the all-around and on floor exercise. At the German World Trials, Schäfer finished fourth in the all-around but posted the highest score on balance beam. She next competed at a friendly competition in Worms, Germany where she finished eighth in the all-around but helped Germany finish first as a team. Following the competition Schäfer was named as the alternate for the World Championships.

At the World Championships, Sophie Scheder withdrew due to injury, and Schäfer ended up competing in her place. During qualifications Schäfer only competed on balance beam and helped Germany place ninth as a team. Although they did not qualify for the team final, they qualified a team to the 2020 Olympic Games in Tokyo.

=== 2021 ===
At the German Championships, Schäfer finished second in the all-around behind Elisabeth Seitz. On 13 June, she was selected to represent Germany at the 2020 Summer Olympics alongside Seitz, Kim Bui, and Sarah Voss. In qualifications at the Olympic Games, Germany finished ninth as a team and did not advance to the finals. She was selected as the sole representative to compete at the World Championships in Kitakyushu, Japan. During the balance beam final she won the silver medal behind Urara Ashikawa of Japan. This was her third overall world medal on the apparatus.

=== 2022 ===
In June, Schäfer won the gold medal on the balance beam at the Osijek World Challenge Cup in Croatia. She went on to compete at the German Championships, where she won the gold in the balance beam final, and finished sixth in the floor final. In August, Schäfer competed at the European Championships in Munich, where she helped Germany qualify for the team final in fourth place. Individually, she also qualified for the balance beam final. In the team final, the German team of Schäfer, Kim Bui, Emma Malewski, Sarah Voss and Elisabeth Seitz won the bronze medal behind Italy and Great Britain — Germany's first team medal in European Championship history. In the balance beam final, Schäfer finished fifth with a score of 13.200.

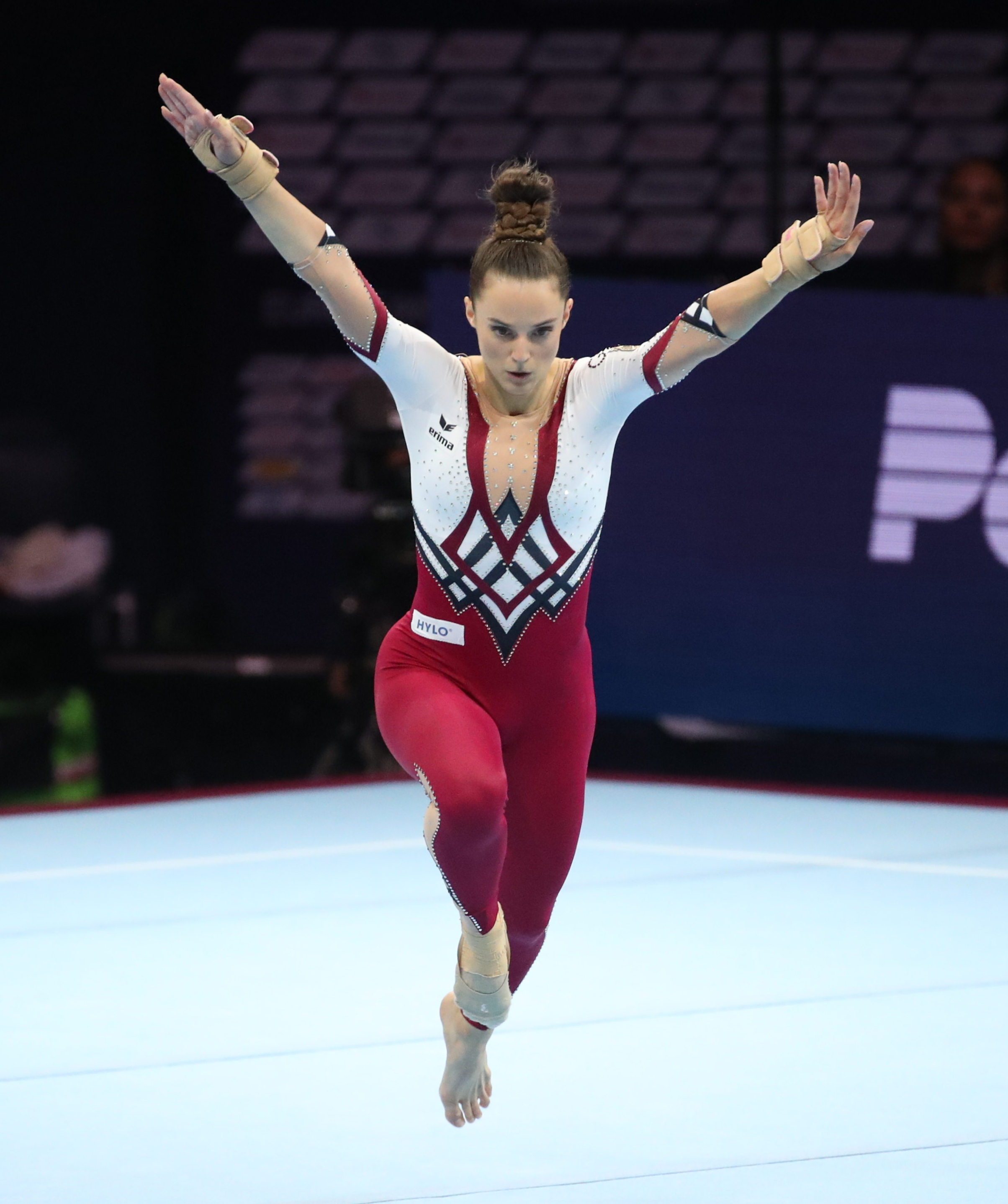
Floor exercise (qualifications)

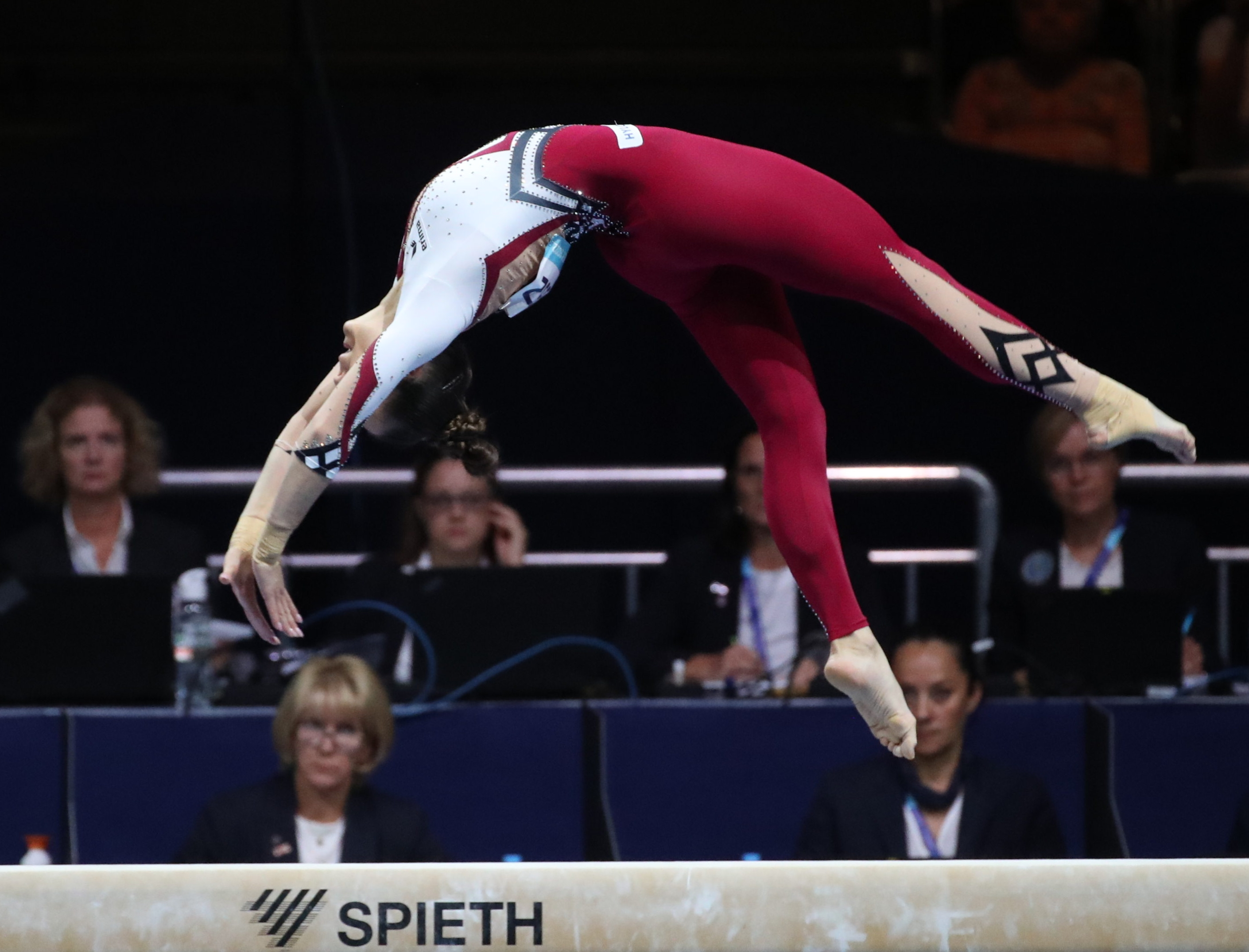
Balance beam (qualifications)

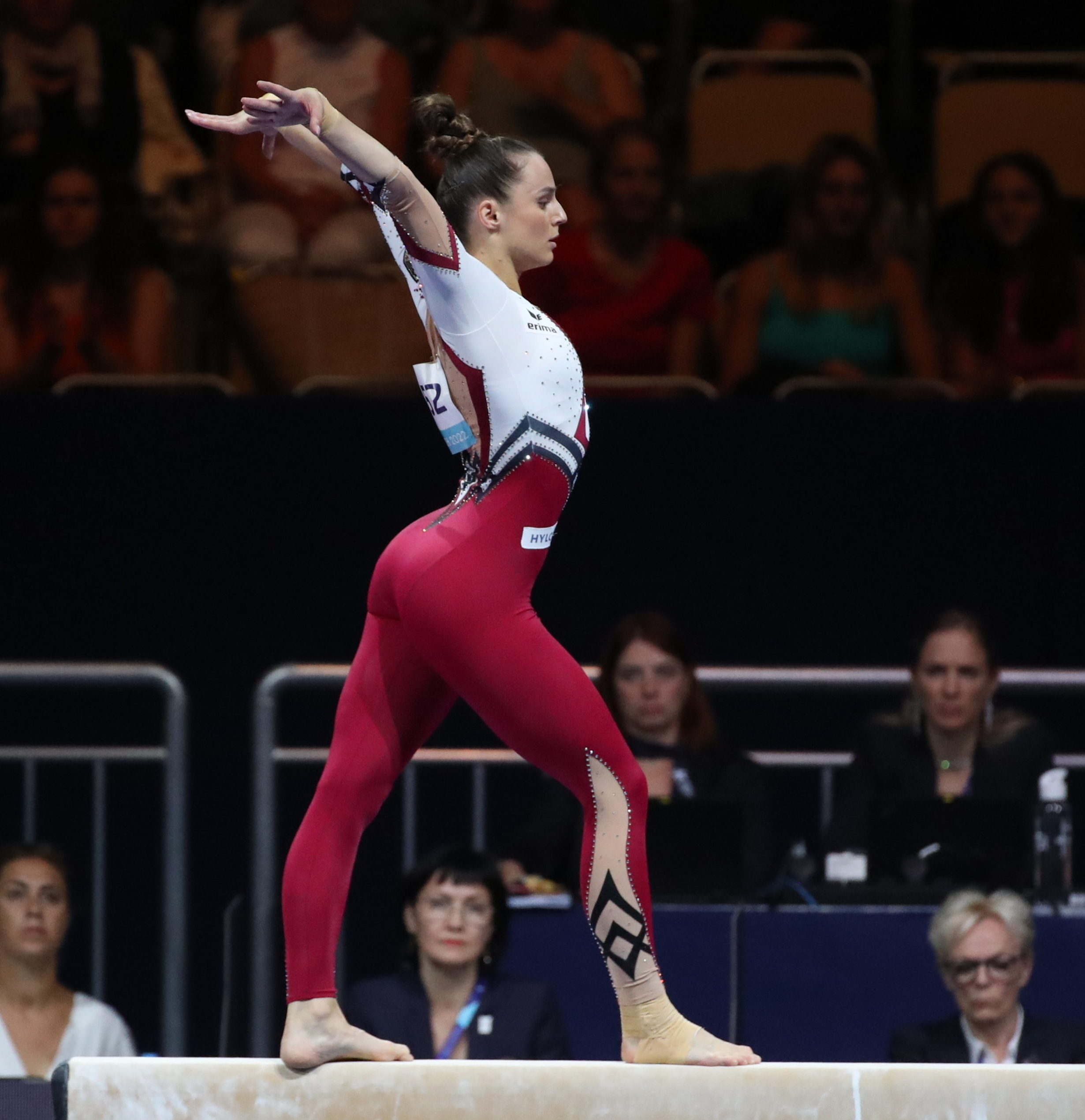
Balance beam (qualifications)

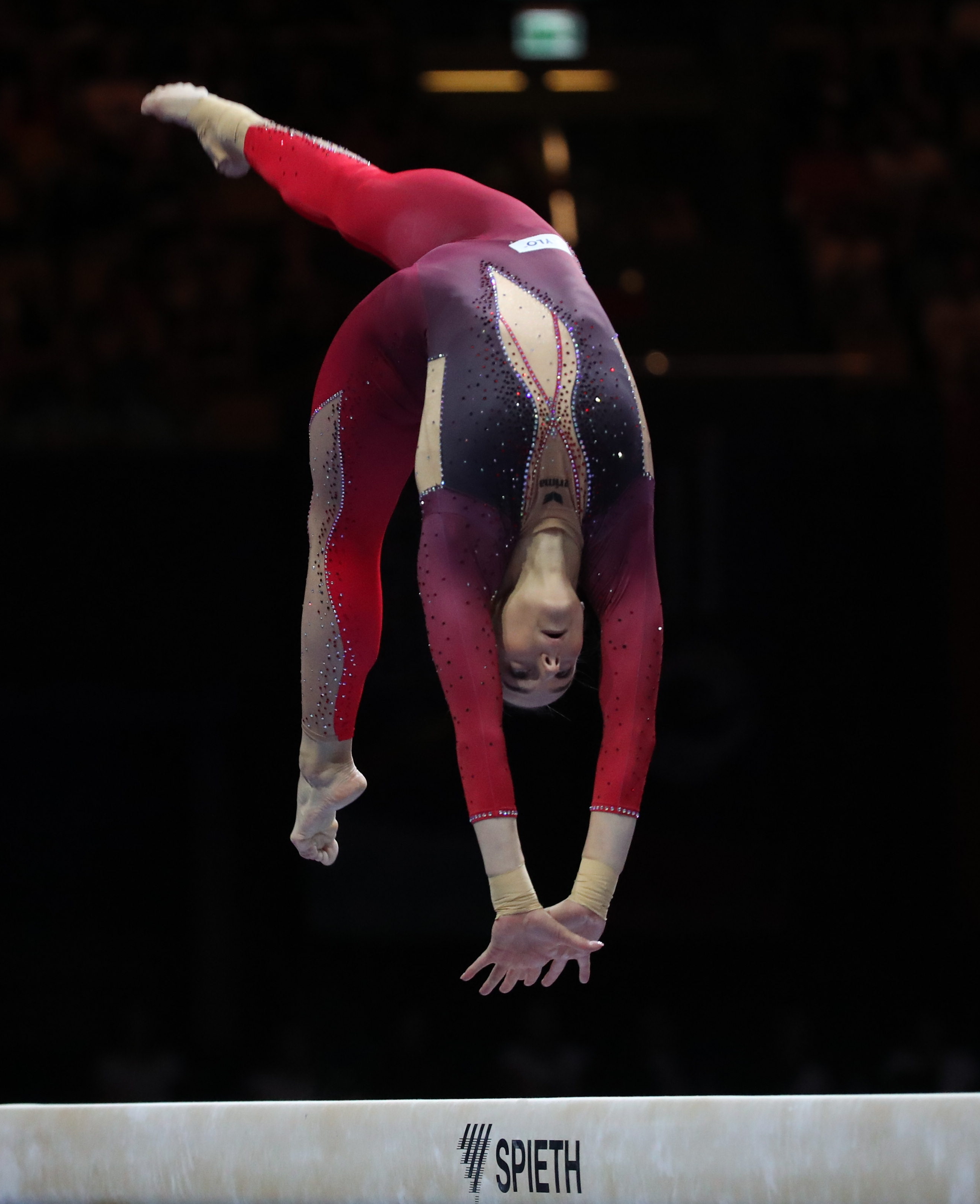
Balance beam final

Schäfer-Betz at the 2022 European Championships

=== 2023 ===
Schäfer won the all-around bronze medal at the German Championships behind Elisabeth Seitz and Emma Malewski. She competed at the World Championships in Antwerp and helped Germany finish 13th in qualifications. Although Germany did not qualify a full team to the 2024 Olympic Games, Schäfer earned an individual berth as the second highest ranked all-around among gymnasts whose teams did not qualify. During the individual finals, Schäfer finished 24th in the all-around and eighth on the balance beam.

=== 2024 ===
At the 2024 Summer Olympics, Schäfer finished 56th in the floor exercise and 26th on balance beam.

== Eponymous skill ==
Schäfer has one eponymous skill listed in the Code of Points.

Apparatus	Name	Description	Difficulty (Note: Valid for the 2025–2028 Code of Points)	Added to the Code of Points
Balance beam	Schaefer	Salto sideward tucked with ½ turn (180°) take off from one leg to side stand	E (0.5)	2014 World Championships

== Competitive history ==
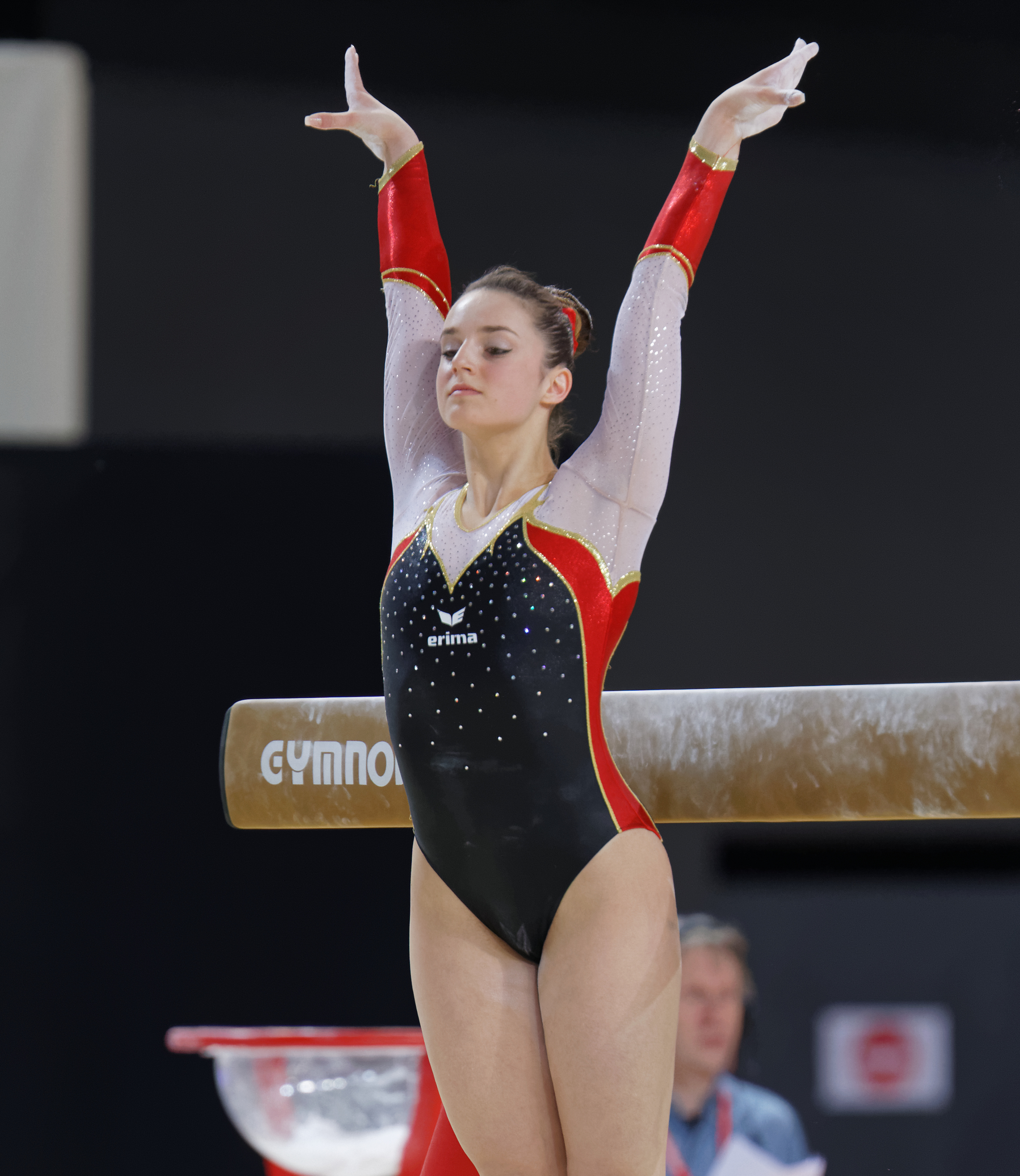
Schäfer at the 2015 European Championships

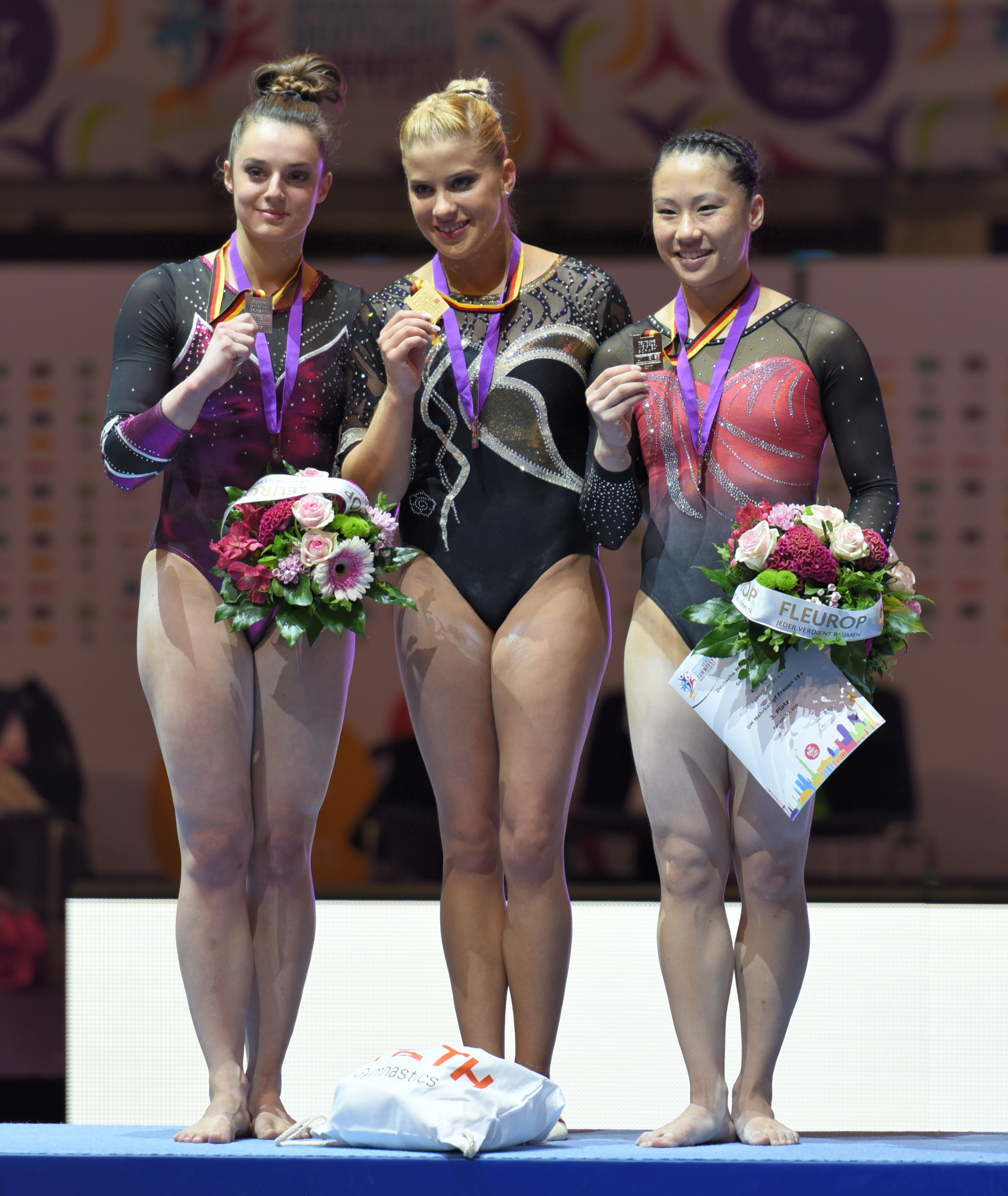
Schäfer (left) at the 2017 German Championships

Competitive history of Pauline Schäfer
Year	Event	Team	AA	VT	UB	BB	FX
2012
2012	Junior European Championships	5					
2013	Cottbus World Cup			R1			
2013	Chemnitz Friendly	4	8				
2013	Ljubljana World Cup					R1	
2013	German Championships		4	4		3rd place, bronze medalist(s)	6
2014	Munich Friendly	2nd place, silver medalist(s)	6				
2014	European Championships	4					
2014	German Championships		2nd place, silver medalist(s)	1st place, gold medalist(s)	6	1st place, gold medalist(s)	2nd place, silver medalist(s)
2014	World Championships	R1					
2014	Stuttgart World Cup	1st place, gold medalist(s)					
2014	Glasgow World Cup		8				
2015	Cottbus World Cup					R2	
2015	European Championships					7	
2015	Flanders International Team Challenge	1st place, gold medalist(s)	5				
2015	German Championships		2nd place, silver medalist(s)	1st place, gold medalist(s)	6	1st place, gold medalist(s)	5
2015	World Trials		3rd place, bronze medalist(s)				
2015	Länderkampf Kunstturnen	2nd place, silver medalist(s)	2nd place, silver medalist(s)				
2015	World Championships		19			3rd place, bronze medalist(s)	
2015	Arthur Gander Memorial		2nd place, silver medalist(s)				
2015	Swiss Cup	3rd place, bronze medalist(s)					
2016	National Team Cup		1st place, gold medalist(s)				
2016	Stuttgart World Cup		5				
2016	Olympic Test Event	2nd place, silver medalist(s)				6	5
2016	German Championships		3rd place, bronze medalist(s)			1st place, gold medalist(s)	1st place, gold medalist(s)
2016	Olympic Trials		4				
2016	Chemnitz Friendly	1st place, gold medalist(s)	2nd place, silver medalist(s)				
2016	Olympic Games	6					R2
2017	National Team Cup	1st place, gold medalist(s)	2nd place, silver medalist(s)				
2017	Stuttgart World Cup		4				
2017	European Championships		20				6
2017	German Championships		2nd place, silver medalist(s)		4	4	1st place, gold medalist(s)
2017	World Trials		2nd place, silver medalist(s)				
2017	World Championships					1st place, gold medalist(s)	
2017	Cottbus World Cup					2nd place, silver medalist(s)	3rd place, bronze medalist(s)
2018	German Euro Trials		1st place, gold medalist(s)				
2018	Sainté Gym Cup	2nd place, silver medalist(s)	3rd place, bronze medalist(s)				
2018	European Championships	R2				6	
2018	German World Trials				2nd place, silver medalist(s)	1st place, gold medalist(s)	
2019	DTB Team Challenge	5					
2019	European Championships					6	
2019	German Championships		6				6
2019	German World Trials		4				
2019	Worms Friendly	1st place, gold medalist(s)	8				
2019	World Championships	R1					
2021	German Championships		2nd place, silver medalist(s)				
2021	Olympic Games	R1					
2021	World Championships					2nd place, silver medalist(s)	
2022	Osijek Challenge Cup					1st place, gold medalist(s)	
2022	German Championships					1st place, gold medalist(s)	6
2022	European Championships	3rd place, bronze medalist(s)				5	
2023	German Championships		3rd place, bronze medalist(s)		3rd place, bronze medalist(s)	1st place, gold medalist(s)	
2023	Heidelberg Friendly	1st place, gold medalist(s)	5				
2023	World Championships	13	24			8	
2023	Arthur Gander Memorial		4				
2023	Swiss Cup	7					
2024	German Championships					3rd place, bronze medalist(s)	3rd place, bronze medalist(s)
2024	Olympic Games					26	
2026	Ojisek Challenge Cup					8	
2026	German Championships		3rd place, bronze medalist(s)		6	2nd place, silver medalist(s)	
2026	European Championships	5				4	
