= Friedl Iby =

German artistic gymnast (1905–1960)

Medal record

Women's gymnastics

Representing Germany

Olympic Games
Gold medal – first place	1936 Berlin	Team

Friedl Iby (6 April 1905 – 15 April 1960) was a German gymnast who competed in the 1936 Summer Olympics. In 1936 she won the gold medal as member of the German gymnastics team.
