= Trudi Meyer =

German artistic gymnast

Medal record

Women's gymnastics

Representing Germany

Olympic Games
Gold medal – first place	1936 Berlin	Team

Gertrud "Trudi" Meyer (13 July 1914 – 23 October 1999) was a German gymnast who competed in the 1936 Summer Olympics. In 1936 she won the gold medal as a member of the German gymnastics team.

Although Meyer was the highest individual all-around scorer at these Olympics, she is not recognized as an Olympic All-Around Champion like subsequent women gymnasts such as Larissa Latynina, Věra Čáslavská, Nadia Comăneci, Elena Shushunova, or Simone Biles because individual medals were not awarded to women at the Olympics until 1952. This is a lack-of-individual distinction that she shares with the highest women's individual overall scorer at the 1948 Olympic, Zdeňka Honsová, as well as with whomever was the highest scorer of the women's gymnastics competition at the 1928 Amsterdam Summer Olympic Games.
