= Irma Walther =

German gymnast (1920–2005)

Personal information
- Nationality: German
- Born: 14 September 1920; Nuremberg, Germany
- Died: 31 May 2005 (aged 84); Nuremberg, Germany

Sport
- Sport: Gymnastics

Irma Walther (14 September 1920 – 31 May 2005) was a German gymnast. She competed in seven events at the 1952 Summer Olympics.
