= Lydia Zeitlhofer =

German gymnast (1931–2019)

Personal information
- Nationality: German
- Born: 18 February 1931; Nuremberg, Germany
- Died: 10 September 2019 (aged 88)

Sport
- Sport: Gymnastics

Lydia Zeitlhofer (18 February 1931 – 10 September 2019) was a German gymnast. She competed in seven events at the 1952 Summer Olympics.
