= Isolde Frölian =

German artistic gymnast (1908–1957)

Medal record

Women's gymnastics

Representing Germany

Olympic Games
Gold medal – first place	1936 Berlin	Team

Isolde Frölian (8 April 1908 – 6 November 1957) was a German gymnast who competed in the 1936 Summer Olympics. In 1936 she won the gold medal as a member of the German gymnastics team.
