= Anke Schönfelder =

German gymnast

Personal information
- Nationality: German
- Born: 2 October 1975 (age 49); Berlin, Germany

Sport
- Sport: Gymnastics

Anke Schönfelder (born 2 October 1975) is a German gymnast. She competed in six events at the 1992 Summer Olympics.
