= Anita Bärwirth =

German artistic gymnast (1918–1994)

Medal record

Women's gymnastics

Representing Germany

Olympic Games
Gold medal – first place	1936 Berlin	Team

Anita Bärwirth (30 August 1918 – 13 July 1994) was a German gymnast who competed in the 1936 Summer Olympics, as a member of the German women's gymnastics team. As there were no individual medals in women's gymnastics in 1936, Bärwith shared in the team's gold medal; her individual score was the ninth highest overall.

Bärwith was born in Kiel, Schleswig-Holstein, Germany. She later emigrated to Argentina, where her daughter, Olympic diver Cristina Hardekopf (also known as Christina Hardekopf) was born on 9 December 1940. Bärwith died in Buenos Aires on 13 July 1994.
