= Brigitte Kiesler =

German gymnast

Personal information
- Nationality: German
- Born: 15 August 1924; Ludwigslust, Germany
- Died: 10 May 2013 (aged 88); Grass Valley, California, United States

Sport
- Sport: Gymnastics

Brigitte Kiesler (15 August 1924 – 10 May 2013) was a German gymnast. She competed in seven events at the 1952 Summer Olympics.
