= Elisabeth Ostermeyer =

German gymnast

Personal information
- Nationality: German
- Born: 2 April 1929 Nuremberg, Germany

Sport
- Sport: Gymnastics

Elisabeth Ostermeyer (born 2 April 1929) is a German former gymnast. She competed in seven events at the 1952 Summer Olympics.
