= Gabriele Weller =

German gymnast (born 1976)

Personal information
- Nationality: German
- Born: 2 February 1976 (age 50) Giessen, Germany

Sport
- Sport: Gymnastics
- Event: Artistic Gymnastics

Gabriele Weller (born 2 February 1976) is a German gymnast. She competed in six events at the 1992 Summer Olympics. where she finished ninth with the reunified German team. She also competed in 4 World Championships, and left international gymnastics in 1999 following knee surgery.

In 2000, Gabi moved to the USA and attended Towson University in Maryland where she was a member of the gymnastics team. She returned to Germany later and became a schoolteacher and occasionally worked as a stunt woman in TV productions.
