= Käthe Sohnemann =

German artistic gymnast (1913–1997)

Medal record

Women's gymnastics

Representing Germany

Olympic Games
Gold medal – first place	1936 Berlin	Team

Käthe or Kate Sohnemann (6 May 1913 – 15 October 1997) was a German gymnast who competed in the 1936 Summer Olympics. In 1936 she won the gold medal as member of the German gymnastics team.
