= Diana Schröder =

German artistic gymnast

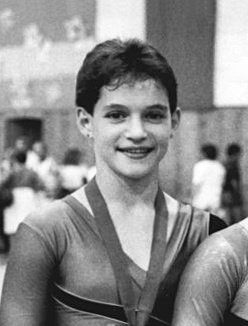
- Diana Schröder in 1989

Personal information
- Born: 18 April 1975 (age 51) Mühlhausen, East Germany
- Height: 1.63 m (5 ft 4 in)
- Weight: 46 kg (101 lb)

Sport
- Sport: Artistic gymnastics
- Club: SC Berlin

Diana Schröder (born 18 April 1975) is a retired German artistic gymnast. In 1992 she won national titles on the balance beam, parallel bars and all-around and was selected for the 1992 Summer Olympics, where she finished in ninth place with the German team. Her best individual result was 29th place all-around.
