= Wolfgard Voß =

German gymnast (1926–2020)

Wolfgard Voss
Personal information
- Native name: Wolfgard Voß
- Nickname: Wölfi
- Nationality: German
- Born: Wolfgard Mönning; 24 June 1926 Oldenburg, Germany
- Died: 7 July 2020 (aged 94) Oldenburg, Germany

Sport
- Sport: Gymnastics

Wolfgard Voss (German: Wolfgard Voß, née Mönning, 24 June 1926 – 7 July 2020), nicknamed "Wölfi", was a German gymnast. She competed in seven events at the 1952 Summer Olympics.
