= Hanna Grages =

German gymnast

Personal information
- Nationality: German
- Born: 8 December 1922; Verden an der Aller, Germany
- Died: 27 August 2010 (aged 87); Verden an der Aller, Germany

Sport
- Sport: Gymnastics

Hanna Grages (8 December 1922 – 27 August 2010) was a German gymnast. She competed in seven events at the 1952 Summer Olympics.
