= Germany at the Summer Olympics =

- IOC code: GER
- NOC: German Olympic Sports Confederation
- Website: www.dosb.de (in German, English, and French)
- Medals: Gold 451 Silver 469 Bronze 498 Total 1,418

Summer Olympics appearances (overview)
- 1896; 1900; 1904; 1908; 1912; 1920–1924; 1928; 1932; 1936; 1948; 1952; 1956–1988; 1992; 1996; 2000; 2004; 2008; 2012; 2016; 2020; 2024

Other related appearances
- 1906 Intercalated Games –––– Saar (1952); United Team of Germany (1956–1964); East Germany (1968–1988); West Germany (1968–1988)

Athletes from Germany (GER) have appeared in 27 of the 30 Summer Olympic Games, having competed in all Games except those of 1920, 1924 and 1948, when they were not permitted to do so. Germany has hosted the Summer Olympic Games twice; the 1936 Games in Berlin, and the 1972 Games in Munich.

The nation appeared 18 times as a single country (IOC code GER), before World War II and again after German reunification in 1990. Three times, from 1956 to 1964, German athletes from the separate states in West and East competed as a United Team of Germany, which is currently listed by the IOC as EUA, not GER.

Due to partition under occupation that resulted in three (until 1957) post-war German states, two concurrent Olympic teams with German athletes appeared on five occasions, in 1952, from 1968 to 1976, and in 1988. The all-time results of German athletes are thus divided among the designations GER, EUA, FRG, GDR and SAA (the Saarland, which only took part in the 1952 Summer Games and won no medals).

Including the Summer Games of 2024, German athletes have won 1419 medals: 450 gold, 470 silver and 499 bronze. The IOC currently splits these results among four codes, even though only the German Democratic Republic (East Germany; GDR) from 1968 to 1988 had sent a separate team to compete against the team of the German NOC that represented Germany (GER) since 1896.

== Timeline of Germany at the Summer Olympics ==
=== 1896–1912 ===
1896–1912

Germany entered all Olympic Games starting in 1896, even though the relations between the German Empire under Kaiser Wilhelm II, and the French Third Republic where Pierre de Coubertin revived Olympic games and held the 1900 Summer Olympics, were strained following the Franco-Prussian War of 1870–71. The country's overall medal ranks varied from second through seventh.

The worst result, seventh, occurred in the 1900 Paris Olympics. The German gymnasts were judged no better than 53rd in the single gymnastic contest organized by the French, behind dozens of Frenchmen, who occupied the first 18 places and thus won all three medals. In contrast, the Gymnastics at the 1896 Summer Olympics in Athens had seen eight contests, with Germans scoring five gold, three silver and two bronze medals.

The anticipated 1916 Summer Olympics, which were to be officially known as the Games of the VI Olympiad, were to have been held in Germany's capital, Berlin. At the outbreak of World War I in 1914, organization continued, as no one foresaw the war dragging on for four years. Eventually, though, the games were canceled.

=== 1920–1948 ===
1928–1932

After World War I, the German Empire became a republic informally known as Weimar Republic, a change which was reflected in a new flag of Germany that in fact was older than the former one, dating back to early 19th century democratic movements. In the Paris Peace Conference, the outbreak of the war was blamed on Germany and other Central Powers allies. These nations, which by now had new governments, were banned from the 1920 Summer Olympics. While all other banned nations were invited again for the 1924 Summer Olympics, held for the second time in Pierre de Coubertin's home town of Paris, the ban on Germany was not lifted until 1925. This was likely related to French Occupation of the Ruhr and the Rheinland between 1923 and 1925.

After 16 years of absence, a new generation of German athletes returned in the 1928 Summer Olympics, scoring second overall. Four years later, the worldwide Great Depression prevented many athletes from competing in the 1932 Games in Los Angeles. Winning only three gold medals, the German team was ranked ninth, though it did finish tied in silver medals, with 12.

1936

In the spring of 1931 the 1936 Summer Olympics were awarded to Berlin, 20 years later than originally planned. From 1933 onwards, the Nazi Party ruled Germany, a change being marked by the use of the Nazi flag. In the games, the 348 German athletes not only outnumbered the 310 Americans, but outscored them for the first time in the medal count in which Germany ranked first. Also, German gymnasts Konrad Frey and Alfred Schwarzmann won the most medals, with six and five in total, of which three each were gold, while American Jesse Owens had won four gold medals himself. Leni Riefenstahl documented the games in the film Olympia.

The 1940 Summer Olympics as well as the 1944 Summer Olympics were canceled due to World War II. For the 1948 Summer Olympics, with the war a recent memory, Germany and Japan were not invited.

== Separate German teams 1952–1988 ==
1952–1956 since 1972

A United Team of Germany with athletes from two states appeared three times at the Olympic games from 1956 to 1964. The IOC currently does not attribute these results to Germany (GER), but lists them separately as the Equipe Unifiée Allemande (EUA).

In the 1952 Games, only athletes from West Germany and the Saar Protectorate took part. The former represented the Federal Republic of Germany (GER), which as the only independent democratic state, covering the largest part of Germany, claimed exclusive mandate to represent the entire country. Athletes from the Saar Protectorate (SAA) competed as a separate team, as the French-occupied region would not join the Federal Republic of Germany until 1955.

West Germany used the code GER at the Games from 1968 to 1976, although its athletes' participation is now coded as FRG by the IOC, a code introduced in 1980.

Athletes from the Soviet-occupied German Democratic Republic (GDR) appeared in a separate team after the United Team effort was discontinued. In five Games, from 1968 to 1980 and again in 1988, they represented the GDR before the East German states joined the Federal Republic of Germany in 1990, and the GDR ceased to exist.

Since 1990, the enlarged Federal Republic of Germany has been simply called Germany (GER). West Germany's six Olympic teams (from 1952, 1968, 1972, 1976, 1984 and 1988) are still listed by the IOC under FRG, though, and not attributed to GER.

In the 1980s, each of the two states participated in one of the multinational boycotts of Summer Games. Many Western countries, including the Federal Republic of Germany, boycotted the Moscow Games of 1980 due to the Soviet invasion of Afghanistan the year before. In return, 14 Eastern Bloc states, including the GDR, boycotted the Los Angeles Games in 1984. Thus, only one German team was present in each of these two Olympics.

=== FRG (West Germany) ===
The Federal Republic of Germany (FRG), often called West Germany during the Cold War, was founded in 1949 as the largest of the three German states formed under occupation after the division of Germany following World War II. The West German NOC continued the tradition of the German NOC that had joined the IOC in 1895, and continued to represent the Germany that was enlarged after the Saar Protectorate (SAA) joined the Federal Republic of Germany in 1956, and after the states of the former German Democratic Republic (GDR) (East Germany) had joined in the process of German reunification in 1990.

German teams competed in the 1952 Summer Olympics under the designations of GER and SAA. In the Games of 1956, 1960 and 1964, German athletes competed as a United Team of Germany (EUA), but 1968 until the end of the Cold War, the two states sent independent teams designated as West and East Germany, until the separate East German state ceased to exist.

=== United Team of Germany 1956–1964 ===
1960–1968

After three German states had been founded in Germany under occupation after World War II, athletes from the Federal Republic of Germany (FRG, West Germany) and the German Democratic Republic (GDR, East Germany) competed together as the United Team of Germany (EUA for French: Équipe unifiée d'Allemagne, German: Gesamtdeutsche Mannschaft) in the 1956, 1960, and 1964 Winter and Summer Olympics.

Prior to that, German athletes from West Germany and the French-occupied Saar Protectorate took part in the 1952 Summer Olympics organized in different teams designated as GER and SAA. The Saar Protectorate joined the Federal Republic after 1955, while the East German authorities, which had not taken part in the 1952 Games, agreed in 1956 to let their athletes compete in a united team that used the black-red-gold tricolour, but with additional Olympic rings in white placed upon the red middle stripe, as East German politicians were eager not to compete under the traditional German flag used both by West Germany and even themselves. Only in 1959, the GDR added socialist symbols to create a distinct Flag of East Germany. As the use of the Deutschlandlied, dating back to 1841 and 1797, of the recently created East German anthem, or of possible combinations was also rejected, Beethoven's melody to Schiller's Ode an die Freude (Ode to Joy) was played for winning German athletes as a compromise in lieu of a national anthem.

During the Games of 1956, 1960 and 1964 the traditional abbreviation GER for Germany was used, or rather the equivalents in the language of the host country. In Innsbruck in 1964, the Austrian officials used the international license plate code of D for Deutschland (Germany) for the country. The IOC code currently uses EUA (from the official French-language IOC designation, Equipe Unifiée Allemande) and applies this in hindsight for the United German Team. No reasoning is given, it may be done to allow for the political circumstances during the German divide between 1949 and 1990, and the involvement of two National Olympic Committees rather than only one.

Despite initially calling for a "united Germany" in the East German anthem, the socialist East German government intensified its separation in Germany, with the erection of the Berlin Wall in August 1961 obstructing travel within Germany even more. The travel of GDR athletes, such as to contests and training sites in the Alps, was limited due to fear of Republikflucht.

As a result of this development, in the 1968 Winter and Summer Olympics, German athletes competed as separate West and East teams, while still using the compromise flag and Beethoven anthem that year. The French organizers of the Grenoble Games used the codes ALL (Allemagne, Germany) and ADE (Allemagne de l'Est, East Germany), which roughly correspond to the IOC codes of GER and GDR.

1968–1988

The separation was completed at the 1972 Winter and Summer Olympics (the latter was hosted by West Germany), when the two countries used separate flags and anthems. This continued until the German Reunification of 1990 where the German Democratic Republic became part of the Federal Republic of Germany.

== Overview of Olympic participation ==
=== Combined medals at the Summer Olympics (including all German NOCs) ===
status after the 2024 Olympics

| | Summer Games | | | | |
| Team (IOC code) | No. | Gold medal | Silver medal | Bronze medal | |
|---|---|---|---|---|---|
| Germany | 18 | 214 | 219 | 254 | 687 |
| Saar | 1 | 0 | 0 | 0 | 0 |
| United Team of Germany | 3 | 28 | 54 | 36 | 118 |
| East Germany | 5 | 153 | 129 | 127 | 409 |
| West Germany | 5 | 56 | 67 | 81 | 204 |
| Total | 27 | 451 | 469 | 498 | 1,418 |

| Combined IOC codes | No. Games | 1st place, gold medalist(s) | 2nd place, silver medalist(s) | 3rd place, bronze medalist(s) | Combined total |
|---|---|---|---|---|---|
| Germany (GER) | 18 | 214 | 219 | 254 | 687 |
| Germany (GER) (EUA) | 21 | 242 | 273 | 290 | 805 |
| Germany (GER) (EUA) (FRG) | 26 | 298 | 340 | 371 | 1,009 |
| Germany (GER) (EUA) (FRG) (GDR) | 31 (Note: Counting the four Summer Games where both East Germany (GDR) and West Germany (FRG) competed as two appearances.) | 451 | 469 | 498 | 1,419 |

=== All German NOCs at the Summer Olympics ===
Host country

| Games | Athletes | Gold | Silver | Bronze | Total | Rank | Team |
| 1896 Athens | 19 | 6 | 5 | 2 | 13 | 3 | Germany (GER) |
| 1900 Paris | 78 | 4 | 3 | 2 | 9 | 7 | Germany (GER) |
| 1904 St. Louis | 18 | 5 | 4 | 5 | 14 | 2 | Germany (GER) |
| 1908 London | 81 | 3 | 5 | 5 | 13 | 5 | Germany (GER) |
| 1912 Stockholm | 185 | 5 | 13 | 7 | 25 | 6 | Germany (GER) |
| 1920 Antwerp | did not participate | | | | | | |
| 1924 Paris | did not participate | | | | | | |
| 1928 Amsterdam | 296 | 10 | 7 | 14 | 31 | 2 | Germany (GER) |
| 1932 Los Angeles | 143 | 3 | 12 | 5 | 20 | 9 | Germany (GER) |
| 1936 Berlin | 433 | 33 | 26 | 30 | 89 | 1 | Germany (GER) |
| 1948 London | did not participate | | | | | | |
| 1952 Helsinki | 205 | 0 | 7 | 17 | 24 | 28 | Germany (GER) |
| 1952 Helsinki | 36 | 0 | 0 | 0 | 0 | – | Saar (SAA) |
| 1956 Melbourne | 158 | 6 | 13 | 7 | 26 | 7 | United Team of Germany (EUA) |
| 1960 Rome | 293 | 12 | 19 | 11 | 42 | 4 | United Team of Germany (EUA) |
| 1964 Tokyo | 337 | 10 | 22 | 18 | 50 | 4 | United Team of Germany (EUA) |
| 1968 Mexico City | 226 | 9 | 9 | 7 | 25 | 5 | East Germany (GDR) |
| 1968 Mexico City | 275 | 5 | 11 | 10 | 26 | 8 | West Germany (FRG) |
| 1972 Munich | 297 | 20 | 23 | 23 | 66 | 3 | East Germany (GDR) |
| 1972 Munich | 423 | 13 | 11 | 16 | 40 | 4 | West Germany (FRG) |
| 1976 Montreal | 267 | 40 | 25 | 25 | 90 | 2 | East Germany (GDR) |
| 1976 Montreal | 290 | 10 | 12 | 17 | 39 | 4 | West Germany (FRG) |
| 1980 Moscow | 345 | 47 | 37 | 42 | 126 | 2 | East Germany (GDR) |
| 1980 Moscow | did not participate | | | | | | West Germany (FRG) |
| 1984 Los Angeles | did not participate | | | | | | East Germany (GDR) |
| 1984 Los Angeles | 390 | 17 | 19 | 23 | 59 | 3 | West Germany (FRG) |
| 1988 Seoul | 259 | 37 | 35 | 30 | 102 | 2 | East Germany (GDR) |
| 1988 Seoul | 347 | 11 | 14 | 15 | 40 | 5 | West Germany (FRG) |
| 1992 Barcelona | 463 | 33 | 21 | 28 | 82 | 3 | Germany (GER) |
| 1996 Atlanta | 465 | 20 | 18 | 27 | 65 | 3 | Germany (GER) |
| 2000 Sydney | 422 | 13 | 17 | 26 | 56 | 5 | Germany (GER) |
| 2004 Athens | 441 | 13 | 16 | 20 | 49 | 6 | Germany (GER) |
| 2008 Beijing | 463 | 16 | 11 | 14 | 41 | 5 | Germany (GER) |
| 2012 London | 392 | 11 | 20 | 13 | 44 | 6 | Germany (GER) |
| 2016 Rio de Janeiro | 425 | 17 | 10 | 15 | 42 | 5 | Germany (GER) |
| 2020 Tokyo | 425 | 10 | 11 | 16 | 37 | 9 | Germany (GER) |
| 2024 Paris | 428 | 12 | 13 | 8 | 33 | 10 | Germany (GER) |
| 2028 Los Angeles | future event | | | | | | |
| 2032 Brisbane | future event | | | | | | |
| Total | 9,324 | 451 | 469 | 498 | 1,418 | 3 | combined German NOCs |

Notes

- ^{NAT} Under the current IOC's attribution policy since 2024, athletes at the early Olympic Games (1896, 1900, and 1904) are attributed according to the national affiliation of their club rather than their nationality. For the 1904 Summer Olympics, this resulted in a net change of +1 gold, −1 silver, and −1 bronze for Germany:
  - (+) Swiss Adolf Spinnler won a gold medal and a bronze medal in gymnastics; as a representative of a German club, his results were attributed to Germany.
  - (–) German Frank Kugler won a silver medal in wrestling and two bronze medals in weightlifting; as a representative of an American club, his results were attributed to the United States.
- ^{ART} Art competitions (1912–1948) are not included in the medal table above, as they were non-sports events formerly part of the Olympic Games. (Note: In 1952, art competition medals, as well as the gold medal awards for feats in alpinism and aeronautics, were removed from the official national medal counts. Only since 2021 have they been officially listed again by the IOC in the medal tables and respective National Olympic Committee (NOC) profiles on its website.) Germany won a total of 24 art competition medals (8 gold, 7 silver, and 9 bronze), across the 1912, 1928, 1932, and 1936 Summer Olympics.

=== Medals by sport (GER 1896-1936, 1952, 1992-current ) ===
Leading in that sport

| Sport | Gold | Silver | Bronze | Total |
|---|---|---|---|---|
| Canoeing | 36 | 21 | 26 | 83 |
| Equestrian | 32 | 15 | 14 | 61 |
| Rowing | 24 | 16 | 15 | 55 |
| Athletics | 20 | 30 | 37 | 87 |
| Gymnastics | 16 | 12 | 15 | 43 |
| Swimming | 15 | 20 | 31 | 66 |
| Cycling | 15 | 17 | 17 | 49 |
| Shooting | 10 | 9 | 5 | 24 |
| Weightlifting | 6 | 7 | 7 | 20 |
| Wrestling | 5 | 12 | 11 | 28 |
| Fencing | 5 | 7 | 9 | 21 |
| Boxing | 4 | 9 | 11 | 24 |
| Field hockey | 4 | 3 | 4 | 11 |
| Tennis | 3 | 6 | 2 | 11 |
| Sailing | 3 | 5 | 7 | 15 |
| Judo | 3 | 4 | 15 | 22 |
| Diving | 2 | 8 | 13 | 23 |
| Beach volleyball | 2 | 1 | 1 | 4 |
| Triathlon | 2 | 1 | 0 | 3 |
| Modern pentathlon | 2 | 0 | 1 | 3 |
| Handball | 1 | 2 | 1 | 4 |
| Water polo | 1 | 2 | 0 | 3 |
| Football | 1 | 1 | 4 | 6 |
| 3x3 basketball | 1 | 0 | 0 | 1 |
| Table tennis | 0 | 4 | 5 | 9 |
| Archery | 0 | 3 | 2 | 5 |
| Taekwondo | 0 | 1 | 1 | 2 |
| Golf | 0 | 1 | 0 | 1 |
| Rugby | 0 | 1 | 0 | 1 |
| Totals (29 entries) | 213 | 218 | 254 | 685 |

These totals do not include the one gold and one silver medal won by Germany in figure skating at the 1908 Summer Olympics.

==== Best results in non-medaling sports ====
Summer
| Sport | Rank | Athlete | Event & Year |
| Artistic swimming | 14th | Monika Müller | Women's solo in 1992 |
| Artistic swimming | 14th | Monika Müller & Margit Schreib | Women's duet in 1992 |
| Badminton | 5th | Huaiwen Xu | Women's singles in 2008 |
| Badminton | 5th | Michael Fuchs & Birgit Michels | Mixed doubles in 2012 |
| Basketball | 4th | Germany men's team | Men's tournament in 2024 |
| BMX freestyle | 6th | Lara Lessmann | Women's freestyle in 2020 |
| BMX racing | 14th | Nadja Pries | Women's racing in 2016 |
| Skateboarding | 9th | Lilly Stoephasius | Women's park in 2020 |
| Sport climbing | 9th | Yannick Flohe | Men's combined in 2020 |
| Sport climbing | 9th | Yannick Flohe | Men's combined in 2024 |
| Surfing | 17th | Leon Glatzer | Men's shortboard in 2020 |
| Surfing | 17th | Tim Elter | Men's shortboard in 2024 |
| Surfing | 17th | Camilla Kemp | Women's shortboard in 2024 |
| Volleyball | 5th | Germany men's national volleyball team | Men's tournament in 2012 |

=== Medals by sport (EUA 1956-1964) ===
| Sport | Gold | Silver | Bronze | Total |
|---|---|---|---|---|
| Equestrian | 5 | 5 | 4 | 14 |
| Athletics | 4 | 18 | 8 | 30 |
| Canoeing | 4 | 5 | 2 | 11 |
| Rowing | 4 | 4 | 1 | 9 |
| Diving | 3 | 1 | 0 | 4 |
| Swimming | 1 | 5 | 6 | 12 |
| Wrestling | 1 | 5 | 3 | 9 |
| Cycling | 1 | 4 | 2 | 7 |
| Boxing | 1 | 3 | 2 | 6 |
| Fencing | 1 | 1 | 2 | 4 |
| Gymnastics | 1 | 1 | 1 | 3 |
| Sailing | 1 | 1 | 1 | 3 |
| Shooting | 1 | 0 | 1 | 2 |
| Judo | 0 | 1 | 1 | 2 |
| Field hockey | 0 | 0 | 1 | 1 |
| Football | 0 | 0 | 1 | 1 |
| Totals (16 entries) | 28 | 54 | 36 | 118 |

=== Medals by sport (GDR 1968-1988) ===
| Sport | Gold | Silver | Bronze | Total |
|---|---|---|---|---|
| Athletics | 38 | 36 | 35 | 109 |
| Swimming | 38 | 32 | 22 | 92 |
| Rowing | 33 | 7 | 8 | 48 |
| Canoeing | 14 | 7 | 9 | 30 |
| Gymnastics | 6 | 13 | 17 | 36 |
| Cycling | 6 | 6 | 4 | 16 |
| Boxing | 5 | 2 | 6 | 13 |
| Shooting | 3 | 8 | 5 | 16 |
| Wrestling | 2 | 3 | 2 | 7 |
| Diving | 2 | 2 | 3 | 7 |
| Sailing | 2 | 2 | 2 | 6 |
| Weightlifting | 1 | 4 | 6 | 11 |
| Judo | 1 | 2 | 6 | 9 |
| Football | 1 | 1 | 1 | 3 |
| Handball | 1 | 1 | 1 | 3 |
| Volleyball | 0 | 2 | 0 | 2 |
| Fencing | 0 | 1 | 0 | 1 |
| Totals (17 entries) | 153 | 129 | 127 | 409 |

=== Medals by sport (FRG 1968-1988) ===
| Sport | Gold | Silver | Bronze | Total |
|---|---|---|---|---|
| Athletics | 12 | 14 | 17 | 43 |
| Equestrian | 11 | 5 | 9 | 25 |
| Fencing | 7 | 8 | 1 | 16 |
| Cycling | 4 | 5 | 5 | 14 |
| Rowing | 4 | 4 | 6 | 14 |
| Shooting | 4 | 4 | 3 | 11 |
| Swimming | 3 | 5 | 14 | 22 |
| Canoeing | 2 | 6 | 3 | 11 |
| Sailing | 2 | 2 | 3 | 7 |
| Weightlifting | 2 | 2 | 3 | 7 |
| Wrestling | 1 | 4 | 4 | 9 |
| Judo | 1 | 4 | 3 | 8 |
| Field hockey | 1 | 3 | 0 | 4 |
| Boxing | 1 | 0 | 5 | 6 |
| Tennis | 1 | 0 | 1 | 2 |
| Handball | 0 | 1 | 0 | 1 |
| Gymnastics | 0 | 0 | 2 | 2 |
| Football | 0 | 0 | 1 | 1 |
| Water polo | 0 | 0 | 1 | 1 |
| Totals (19 entries) | 56 | 67 | 81 | 204 |

== Medalists ==
=== Archery ===
| Medal | Name | Games | Sport | Event |
|---|---|---|---|---|
| Silver | Barbara Mensing; Cornelia Pfohl; Sandra Wagner-Sachse | (United States) 1996 Atlanta | Archery | Women's team |
| Bronze | Barbara Mensing; Cornelia Pfohl; Sandra Wagner-Sachse | (Australia) 2000 Sydney | Archery | Women's team |
| Silver | Lisa Unruh | (Brazil) 2016 Rio de Janeiro | Archery | Women's individual |
| Bronze | Michelle Kroppen; Charline Schwarz; Lisa Unruh | (Japan) 2020 Tokyo | Archery | Women's team |
| Silver | Michelle Kroppen; Florian Unruh | (France) 2024 Paris | Archery | Mixed team |

=== Athletics ===
| Medal | Name | Games | Sport | Event |
|---|---|---|---|---|
| Silver | Fritz Hofmann | (Greece) 1896 Athens | Athletics | Men's 100 metres |
| Bronze | Paul Weinstein | (United States) 1904 St. Louis | Athletics | Men's high jump |
| Silver | Hanns Braun; Hans Eicke; Arthur Hoffmann; Otto Trieloff | (United Kingdom) 1908 London | Athletics | Men's medley relay |
| Bronze | Hanns Braun | (United Kingdom) 1908 London | Athletics | Men's 800 metres |
| Silver | Hanns Braun | (Sweden) 1912 Stockholm | Athletics | Men's 400 metres |
| Silver | Hans Liesche | (Sweden) 1912 Stockholm | Athletics | Men's high jump |
| Gold | Lina Radke | (Netherlands) 1928 Amsterdam | Athletics | Women's 800 metres |
| Silver | Richard Corts; Hubert Houben; Helmut Körnig; Georg Lammers | (Netherlands) 1928 Amsterdam | Athletics | Men's 4 × 100 metres relay |
| Silver | Hermann Engelhard; Richard Krebs; Otto Neumann; Harry Werner Storz | (Netherlands) 1928 Amsterdam | Athletics | Men's 4 × 400 metres relay |
| Bronze | Georg Lammers | (Netherlands) 1928 Amsterdam | Athletics | Men's 100 metres |
| Bronze | Helmut Körnig | (Netherlands) 1928 Amsterdam | Athletics | Men's 200 metres |
| Bronze | Joachim Büchner | (Netherlands) 1928 Amsterdam | Athletics | Men's 400 metres |
| Bronze | Hermann Engelhard | (Netherlands) 1928 Amsterdam | Athletics | Men's 800 metres |
| Bronze | Emil Hirschfeld | (Netherlands) 1928 Amsterdam | Athletics | Men's shot put |
| Bronze | Anni Holdmann; Leni Junker; Rosa Kellner; Leni Schmidt | (Netherlands) 1928 Amsterdam | Athletics | Women's 4 × 100 metres relay |
| Silver | Erich Borchmeyer; Friedrich Hendrix; Arthur Jonath; Helmut Körnig | (United States) 1932 Los Angeles | Athletics | Men's 4 × 100 metres relay |
| Silver | Ellen Braumüller | (United States) 1932 Los Angeles | Athletics | Women's javelin throw |
| Bronze | Arthur Jonath | (United States) 1932 Los Angeles | Athletics | Men's 100 metres |
| Bronze | Wolrad Eberle | (United States) 1932 Los Angeles | Athletics | Men's decathlon |
| Bronze | Tilly Fleischer | (United States) 1932 Los Angeles | Athletics | Women's javelin throw |
| Gold | Hans Woellke | (Germany) 1936 Berlin | Athletics | Men's shot put |
| Gold | Karl Hein | (Germany) 1936 Berlin | Athletics | Men's hammer throw |
| Gold | Gerhard Stöck | (Germany) 1936 Berlin | Athletics | Men's javelin throw |
| Gold | Gisela Mauermayer | (Germany) 1936 Berlin | Athletics | Women's discus throw |
| Gold | Tilly Fleischer | (Germany) 1936 Berlin | Athletics | Women's javelin throw |
| Silver | Lutz Long | (Germany) 1936 Berlin | Athletics | Men's long jump |
| Silver | Erwin Blask | (Germany) 1936 Berlin | Athletics | Men's hammer throw |
| Silver | Anni Steuer | (Germany) 1936 Berlin | Athletics | Women's 80 metres hurdles |
| Silver | Luise Krüger | (Germany) 1936 Berlin | Athletics | Women's javelin throw |
| Bronze | Alfred Dompert | (Germany) 1936 Berlin | Athletics | Men's 3000 metres steeplechase |
| Bronze | Erich Borchmeyer; Erwin Gillmeister; Gerd Hornberger; Wilhelm Leichum | (Germany) 1936 Berlin | Athletics | Men's 4 × 100 metres relay |
| Bronze | Helmut Hamann; Rudolf Harbig; Harry Voigt; Friedrich von Stülpnagel | (Germany) 1936 Berlin | Athletics | Men's 4 × 400 metres relay |
| Bronze | Gerhard Stöck | (Germany) 1936 Berlin | Athletics | Men's shot put |
| Bronze | Käthe Krauß | (Germany) 1936 Berlin | Athletics | Women's 100 metres |
| Bronze | Elfriede Kaun | (Germany) 1936 Berlin | Athletics | Women's high jump |
| Bronze | Paula Mollenhauer | (Germany) 1936 Berlin | Athletics | Women's discus throw |
| Silver | Karl Storch | (Finland) 1952 Helsinki | Athletics | Men's hammer throw |
| Silver | Helga Klein; Ursula Knab; Marga Petersen; Maria Sander | (Finland) 1952 Helsinki | Athletics | Women's 4 × 100 metres relay |
| Silver | Marianne Werner | (Finland) 1952 Helsinki | Athletics | Women's shot put |
| Bronze | Heinz Ulzheimer | (Finland) 1952 Helsinki | Athletics | Men's 800 metres |
| Bronze | Werner Lueg | (Finland) 1952 Helsinki | Athletics | Men's 1500 metres |
| Bronze | Herbert Schade | (Finland) 1952 Helsinki | Athletics | Men's 5000 metres |
| Bronze | Günter Steines; Hans Geister; Heinz Ulzheimer; Karl-Friedrich Haas | (Finland) 1952 Helsinki | Athletics | Men's 4 × 400 metres relay |
| Bronze | Maria Sander | (Finland) 1952 Helsinki | Athletics | Women's 80 metres hurdles |
| Gold | Dieter Baumann | (Spain) 1992 Barcelona | Athletics | Men's 5000 metres |
| Gold | Heike Henkel | (Spain) 1992 Barcelona | Athletics | Women's high jump |
| Gold | Heike Drechsler | (Spain) 1992 Barcelona | Athletics | Women's long jump |
| Gold | Silke Renk | (Spain) 1992 Barcelona | Athletics | Women's javelin throw |
| Silver | Jürgen Schult | (Spain) 1992 Barcelona | Athletics | Men's discus throw |
| Bronze | Stephan Freigang | (Spain) 1992 Barcelona | Athletics | Men's marathon |
| Bronze | Ronald Weigel | (Spain) 1992 Barcelona | Athletics | Men's 50 kilometres walk |
| Bronze | Kathrin Neimke | (Spain) 1992 Barcelona | Athletics | Women's shot put |
| Bronze | Karen Forkel | (Spain) 1992 Barcelona | Athletics | Women's javelin throw |
| Bronze | Sabine Braun | (Spain) 1992 Barcelona | Athletics | Women's heptathlon |
| Gold | Lars Riedel | (United States) 1996 Atlanta | Athletics | Men's discus throw |
| Gold | Astrid Kumbernuss | (United States) 1996 Atlanta | Athletics | Women's shot put |
| Gold | Ilke Wyludda | (United States) 1996 Atlanta | Athletics | Women's discus throw |
| Silver | Frank Busemann | (United States) 1996 Atlanta | Athletics | Men's decathlon |
| Bronze | Florian Schwarthoff | (United States) 1996 Atlanta | Athletics | Men's 110 metres hurdles |
| Bronze | Andrej Tiwontschik | (United States) 1996 Atlanta | Athletics | Men's pole vault |
| Bronze | Grit Breuer; Linda Kisabaka; Uta Rohländer; Anja Rücker | (United States) 1996 Atlanta | Athletics | Women's 4 × 400 metres relay |
| Gold | Nils Schumann | (Australia) 2000 Sydney | Athletics | Men's 800 metres |
| Gold | Heike Drechsler | (Australia) 2000 Sydney | Athletics | Women's long jump |
| Silver | Lars Riedel | (Australia) 2000 Sydney | Athletics | Men's discus throw |
| Bronze | Astrid Kumbernuss | (Australia) 2000 Sydney | Athletics | Women's shot put |
| Bronze | Kirsten Münchow | (Australia) 2000 Sydney | Athletics | Women's hammer throw |
| Silver | Nadine Kleinert | (Greece) 2004 Athens | Athletics | Women's shot put |
| Silver | Steffi Nerius | (Greece) 2004 Athens | Athletics | Women's javelin throw |
| Silver | Christina Obergföll | (China) 2008 Beijing | Athletics | Women's javelin throw |
| Gold | Robert Harting | (United Kingdom) 2012 London | Athletics | Men's discus throw |
| Silver | Björn Otto | (United Kingdom) 2012 London | Athletics | Men's pole vault |
| Silver | David Storl | (United Kingdom) 2012 London | Athletics | Men's shot put |
| Silver | Betty Heidler | (United Kingdom) 2012 London | Athletics | Women's hammer throw |
| Silver | Christina Obergföll | (United Kingdom) 2012 London | Athletics | Women's javelin throw |
| Silver | Lilli Schwarzkopf | (United Kingdom) 2012 London | Athletics | Women's heptathlon |
| Bronze | Raphael Holzdeppe | (United Kingdom) 2012 London | Athletics | Men's pole vault |
| Bronze | Linda Stahl | (United Kingdom) 2012 London | Athletics | Women's javelin throw |
| Gold | Christoph Harting | (Brazil) 2016 Rio de Janeiro | Athletics | Men's discus throw |
| Gold | Thomas Röhler | (Brazil) 2016 Rio de Janeiro | Athletics | Men's javelin throw |
| Bronze | Daniel Jasinski | (Brazil) 2016 Rio de Janeiro | Athletics | Men's discus throw |
| Gold | Malaika Mihambo | (Japan) 2020 Tokyo | Athletics | Women's long jump |
| Silver | Kristin Pudenz | (Japan) 2020 Tokyo | Athletics | Women's discus throw |
| Silver | Jonathan Hilbert | (Japan) 2020 Tokyo | Athletics | Men's 50 kilometres walk |
| Gold | Yemisi Ogunleye | (France) 2024 Paris | Athletics | Women's shot put |
| Silver | Leo Neugebauer | (France) 2024 Paris | Athletics | Men's decathlon |
| Silver | Malaika Mihambo | (France) 2024 Paris | Athletics | Women's long jump |
| Bronze | Alexandra Burghardt; Rebekka Haase; Sophia Junk; Gina Lückenkemper; Lisa Mayer | (France) 2024 Paris | Athletics | Women's 4 × 100 metres relay |

=== Basketball ===
| Medal | Name | Games | Sport | Event |
|---|---|---|---|---|
| Gold | Svenja Brunckhorst; Sonja Greinacher; Elisa Mevius; Marie Reichert | (France) 2024 Paris | Basketball | Women's 3x3 tournament |

=== Boxing ===
| Medal | Name | Games | Sport | Event |
|---|---|---|---|---|
| Silver | Ernst Pistulla | (Netherlands) 1928 Amsterdam | Boxing | Men's light heavyweight |
| Silver | Hans Ziglarski | (United States) 1932 Los Angeles | Boxing | Men's bantamweight |
| Silver | Josef Schleinkofer | (United States) 1932 Los Angeles | Boxing | Men's featherweight |
| Silver | Erich Campe | (United States) 1932 Los Angeles | Boxing | Men's welterweight |
| Gold | Willi Kaiser | (Germany) 1936 Berlin | Boxing | Men's flyweight |
| Gold | Herbert Runge | (Germany) 1936 Berlin | Boxing | Men's heavyweight |
| Silver | Michael Murach | (Germany) 1936 Berlin | Boxing | Men's welterweight |
| Silver | Richard Vogt | (Germany) 1936 Berlin | Boxing | Men's light heavyweight |
| Bronze | Josef Miner | (Germany) 1936 Berlin | Boxing | Men's featherweight |
| Silver | Edgar Basel | (Finland) 1952 Helsinki | Boxing | Men's flyweight |
| Bronze | Günther Heidemann | (Finland) 1952 Helsinki | Boxing | Men's welterweight |
| Gold | Andreas Tews | (Spain) 1992 Barcelona | Boxing | Men's featherweight |
| Gold | Torsten May | (Spain) 1992 Barcelona | Boxing | Men's light heavyweight |
| Silver | Marco Rudolph | (Spain) 1992 Barcelona | Boxing | Men's lightweight |
| Bronze | Jan Quast | (Spain) 1992 Barcelona | Boxing | Men's light flyweight |
| Silver | Oktay Urkal | (United States) 1996 Atlanta | Boxing | Men's light welterweight |
| Bronze | Zoltan Lunka | (United States) 1996 Atlanta | Boxing | Men's flyweight |
| Bronze | Thomas Ulrich | (United States) 1996 Atlanta | Boxing | Men's light heavyweight |
| Bronze | Luan Krasniqi | (United States) 1996 Atlanta | Boxing | Men's heavyweight |
| Bronze | Sebastian Köber | (Australia) 2000 Sydney | Boxing | Men's heavyweight |
| Bronze | Rustamhodza Rahimov | (Greece) 2004 Athens | Boxing | Men's flyweight |
| Bronze | Vitali Tajbert | (Greece) 2004 Athens | Boxing | Men's featherweight |
| Bronze | Artem Harutyunyan | (Brazil) 2016 Rio de Janeiro | Boxing | Men's light welterweight |
| Bronze | Nelvie Tiafack | (France) 2024 Paris | Boxing | Men's super heavyweight |

=== Beach volleyball ===
| Medal | Name | Games | Sport | Event |
|---|---|---|---|---|
| Bronze | Jörg Ahmann; Axel Hager | (Australia) 2000 Sydney | Beach volleyball | Men's tournament |
| Gold | Julius Brink; Jonas Reckermann | (United Kingdom) 2012 London | Beach volleyball | Men's tournament |
| Gold | Laura Ludwig; Kira Walkenhorst | (Brazil) 2016 Rio de Janeiro | Beach volleyball | Women's tournament |
| Silver | Nils Ehlers; Clemens Wickler | (France) 2024 Paris | Beach volleyball | Men's tournament |

=== Canoeing ===
| Medal | Name | Games | Sport | Event |
|---|---|---|---|---|
| Gold | Ernst Krebs | (Germany) 1936 Berlin | Canoeing | Men's sprint K-1 10000 metres |
| Gold | Paul Wevers; Ludwig Landen | (Germany) 1936 Berlin | Canoeing | Men's sprint K-2 10000 metres |
| Silver | Helmut Cämmerer | (Germany) 1936 Berlin | Canoeing | Men's sprint K-1 1000 metres |
| Silver | Ewald Tilker; Fritz Bondroit | (Germany) 1936 Berlin | Canoeing | Men's sprint K-2 1000 metres |
| Silver | Erich Hanisch; Willi Horn | (Germany) 1936 Berlin | Canoeing | Men's sprint K-2 (folding) 10000 metres |
| Bronze | Erich Koschik | (Germany) 1936 Berlin | Canoeing | Men's sprint C-1 1000 metres |
| Bronze | Xaver Hörmann | (Germany) 1936 Berlin | Canoeing | Men's sprint K-1 (folding) 10000 metres |
| Bronze | Egon Drews; Wilfried Soltau | (Finland) 1952 Helsinki | Canoeing | Men's sprint C-2 1000 metres |
| Bronze | Egon Drews; Wilfried Soltau | (Finland) 1952 Helsinki | Canoeing | Men's sprint C-2 10000 metres |
| Bronze | Michael Scheuer | (Finland) 1952 Helsinki | Canoeing | Men's sprint K-1 10000 metres |
| Gold | Elisabeth Micheler-Jones | (Spain) 1992 Barcelona | Canoeing | Women's slalom K-1 |
| Gold | Ulrich Papke; Ingo Spelly | (Spain) 1992 Barcelona | Canoeing | Men's sprint C-2 1000 metres |
| Gold | Kay Bluhm; Torsten Gutsche | (Spain) 1992 Barcelona | Canoeing | Men's sprint C-2 500 metres |
| Gold | Kay Bluhm; Torsten Gutsche | (Spain) 1992 Barcelona | Canoeing | Men's sprint C-2 1000 metres |
| Gold | Mario von Appen; Oliver Kegel; Thomas Reineck; André Wohllebe | (Spain) 1992 Barcelona | Canoeing | Men's sprint K-4 1000 metres |
| Gold | Birgit Schmidt | (Spain) 1992 Barcelona | Canoeing | Women's sprint K-1 500 metres |
| Gold | Ramona Portwich; Anke von Seck | (Spain) 1992 Barcelona | Canoeing | Women's sprint K-2 500 metres |
| Silver | Ulrich Papke; Ingo Spelly | (Spain) 1992 Barcelona | Canoeing | Men's sprint C-2 500 metres |
| Silver | Katrin Borchert; Ramona Portwich; Birgit Schmidt; Anke von Seck | (Spain) 1992 Barcelona | Canoeing | Women's sprint K-4 500 metres |
| Bronze | Jochen Lettmann | (Spain) 1992 Barcelona | Canoeing | Men's slalom K-1 |
| Bronze | Olaf Heukrodt | (Spain) 1992 Barcelona | Canoeing | Men's sprint C-1 500 metres |
| Gold | Oliver Fix | (United States) 1996 Atlanta | Canoeing | Men's slalom K-1 |
| Gold | Andreas Dittmer; Gunar Kirchbach | (United States) 1996 Atlanta | Canoeing | Men's sprint C-2 1000 metres |
| Gold | Kay Bluhm; Torsten Gutsche | (United States) 1996 Atlanta | Canoeing | Men's sprint K-2 500 metres |
| Gold | Thomas Reineck; Olaf Winter; Detlef Hofmann; Mark Zabel | (United States) 1996 Atlanta | Canoeing | Men's sprint K-4 1000 metres |
| Gold | Anett Schuck; Birgit Fischer; Manuela Mucke; Ramona Portwich | (United States) 1996 Atlanta | Canoeing | Women's sprint K-4 500 metres |
| Silver | Kay Bluhm; Torsten Gutsche | (United States) 1996 Atlanta | Canoeing | Men's sprint K-2 1000 metres |
| Silver | Birgit Fischer; Ramona Portwich | (United States) 1996 Atlanta | Canoeing | Women's sprint K-2 500 metres |
| Bronze | André Ehrenberg; Michael Senft | (United States) 1996 Atlanta | Canoeing | Men's slalom C-2 |
| Bronze | Thomas Becker | (United States) 1996 Atlanta | Canoeing | Men's slalom K-1 |
| Gold | Thomas Schmidt | (Australia) 2000 Sydney | Canoeing | Men's slalom K-1 |
| Gold | Andreas Dittmer | (Australia) 2000 Sydney | Canoeing | Men's sprint C-1 1000 metres |
| Gold | Birgit Fischer; Katrin Wagner | (Australia) 2000 Sydney | Canoeing | Women's sprint K-2 500 metres |
| Gold | Birgit Fischer; Manuela Mucke; Anett Schuck; Katrin Wagner | (Australia) 2000 Sydney | Canoeing | Women's sprint K-4 500 metres |
| Silver | Jan Schäfer; Mark Zabel; Björn Bach; Stefan Ulm | (Australia) 2000 Sydney | Canoeing | Men's sprint K-4 1000 metres |
| Bronze | Andreas Dittmer | (Australia) 2000 Sydney | Canoeing | Men's sprint C-1 500 metres |
| Bronze | Stefan Uteß; Lars Kober | (Australia) 2000 Sydney | Canoeing | Men's sprint C-2 1000 metres |
| Bronze | Ronald Rauhe; Tim Wieskötter | (Australia) 2000 Sydney | Canoeing | Men's sprint K-2 500 metres |
| Gold | Andreas Dittmer | (Greece) 2004 Athens | Canoeing | Men's sprint C-1 500 metres |
| Gold | Christian Gille; Thomas Wylenzek | (Greece) 2004 Athens | Canoeing | Men's sprint C-2 1000 metres |
| Gold | Ronald Rauhe; Tim Wieskötter | (Greece) 2004 Athens | Canoeing | Men's sprint K-2 500 metres |
| Gold | Birgit Fischer; Carolin Leonhardt; Maike Nollen; Katrin Wagner | (Greece) 2004 Athens | Canoeing | Women's sprint K-4 500 metres |
| Silver | Marcus Becker; Stefan Henze | (Greece) 2004 Athens | Canoeing | Men's slalom C-2 |
| Silver | Andreas Dittmer | (Greece) 2004 Athens | Canoeing | Men's sprint C-1 1000 metres |
| Silver | Andreas Ihle; Mark Zabel; Björn Bach; Stefan Ulm | (Greece) 2004 Athens | Canoeing | Men's sprint K-4 1000 metres |
| Silver | Birgit Fischer; Carolin Leonhardt | (Greece) 2004 Athens | Canoeing | Women's sprint K-2 500 metres |
| Bronze | Stefan Pfannmöller | (Greece) 2004 Athens | Canoeing | Men's slalom C-1 |
| Gold | Alexander Grimm | (China) 2008 Beijing | Canoeing | Men's slalom K-1 |
| Gold | Andreas Ihle; Martin Hollstein | (China) 2008 Beijing | Canoeing | Men's sprint K-2 1000 metres |
| Gold | Fanny Fischer; Nicole Reinhardt; Katrin Wagner-Augustin; Conny Waßmuth | (China) 2008 Beijing | Canoeing | Women's sprint K-4 500 metres |
| Silver | Christian Gille; Thomas Wylenzek | (China) 2008 Beijing | Canoeing | Men's sprint C-2 1000 metres |
| Silver | Ronald Rauhe; Tim Wieskötter | (China) 2008 Beijing | Canoeing | Men's sprint K-2 500 metres |
| Bronze | Christian Gille; Thomas Wylenzek | (China) 2008 Beijing | Canoeing | Men's sprint C-2 500 metres |
| Bronze | Lutz Altepost; Norman Bröckl; Torsten Eckbrett; Björn Goldschmidt | (China) 2008 Beijing | Canoeing | Men's sprint K-4 1000 metres |
| Bronze | Katrin Wagner-Augustin | (China) 2008 Beijing | Canoeing | Women's sprint K-1 500 metres |
| Gold | Sebastian Brendel | (United Kingdom) 2012 London | Canoeing | Men's sprint C-1 1000 metres |
| Gold | Peter Kretschmer; Kurt Kuschela | (United Kingdom) 2012 London | Canoeing | Men's sprint C-2 1000 metres |
| Gold | Franziska Weber; Tina Dietze | (United Kingdom) 2012 London | Canoeing | Women's sprint K-2 500 metres |
| Silver | Sideris Tasiadis | (United Kingdom) 2012 London | Canoeing | Men's slalom C-1 |
| Silver | Carolin Leonhardt; Franziska Weber; Katrin Wagner-Augustin; Tina Dietze | (United Kingdom) 2012 London | Canoeing | Women's sprint K-4 500 metres |
| Bronze | Hannes Aigner | (United Kingdom) 2012 London | Canoeing | Men's slalom K-1 |
| Bronze | Max Hoff | (United Kingdom) 2012 London | Canoeing | Men's sprint K-1 1000 metres |
| Bronze | Andreas Ihle; Martin Hollstein | (United Kingdom) 2012 London | Canoeing | Men's sprint K-2 1000 metres |
| Gold | Sebastian Brendel | (Brazil) 2016 Rio de Janeiro | Canoeing | Men's sprint C-1 1000 metres |
| Gold | Sebastian Brendel; Jan Vandrey | (Brazil) 2016 Rio de Janeiro | Canoeing | Men's sprint C-2 1000 metres |
| Gold | Max Rendschmidt; Marcus Gross | (Brazil) 2016 Rio de Janeiro | Canoeing | Men's sprint K-2 1000 metres |
| Gold | Max Rendschmidt; Tom Liebscher; Max Hoff; Marcus Gross | (Brazil) 2016 Rio de Janeiro | Canoeing | Men's sprint K-4 1000 metres |
| Silver | Franziska Weber; Tina Dietze | (Brazil) 2016 Rio de Janeiro | Canoeing | Women's sprint K-2 500 metres |
| Silver | Sabrina Hering; Franziska Weber; Steffi Kriegerstein; Tina Dietze | (Brazil) 2016 Rio de Janeiro | Canoeing | Women's sprint K-4 500 metres |
| Bronze | Ronald Rauhe | (Brazil) 2016 Rio de Janeiro | Canoeing | Men's sprint K-1 200 metres |
| Gold | Max Rendschmidt; Ronald Rauhe; Tom Liebscher; Max Lemke | (Japan) 2020 Tokyo | Canoeing | Men's sprint K-4 500 metres |
| Gold | Ricarda Funk | (Japan) 2020 Tokyo | Canoeing | Women's slalom K-1 |
| Silver | Max Hoff; Jacob Schopf | (Japan) 2020 Tokyo | Canoeing | Men's sprint K-2 1000 metres |
| Bronze | Sideris Tasiadis | (Japan) 2020 Tokyo | Canoeing | Men's slalom C-1 |
| Bronze | Andrea Herzog | (Japan) 2020 Tokyo | Canoeing | Women's slalom C-1 |
| Bronze | Hannes Aigner | (Japan) 2020 Tokyo | Canoeing | Men's slalom K-1 |
| Bronze | Sebastian Brendel; Tim Hecker | (Japan) 2020 Tokyo | Canoeing | Men's sprint C-2 1000 metres |
| Gold | Max Lemke; Tom Liebscher; Max Rendschmidt; Jacob Schopf | (France) 2024 Paris | Canoeing | Men's sprint K-4 500 metres |
| Gold | Max Lemke; Jacob Schopf | (France) 2024 Paris | Canoeing | Men's sprint K-2 500 metres |
| Silver | Elena Lilik | (France) 2024 Paris | Canoeing | Women's slalom C-1 |
| Silver | Sarah Brüßler; Jule Hake; Pauline Jagsch; Paulina Paszek | (France) 2024 Paris | Canoeing | Women's sprint K-4 500 metres |
| Bronze | Noah Hegge | (France) 2024 Paris | Canoeing | Men's slalom kayak cross |
| Bronze | Jule Hake; Paulina Paszek | (France) 2024 Paris | Canoeing | Women's sprint K-2 500 metres |

=== Cycling ===
| Medal | Name | Games | Sport | Event |
|---|---|---|---|---|
| Silver | August Gödrich | (Greece) 1896 Athens | Cycling | Men's road race individual |
| Silver | Karl Duill | (France) 1900 Paris | Cycling | Men's points race |
| Silver | Max Götze; Rudolf Katzer; Hermann Martens; Karl Neumer | (United Kingdom) 1908 London | Cycling | Men's team pursuit |
| Bronze | Karl Neumer | (United Kingdom) 1908 London | Cycling | Men's 660 yards |
| Bronze | Hans Bernhardt; Karl Köther | (Netherlands) 1928 Amsterdam | Cycling | Men's tandem |
| Gold | Toni Merkens | (Germany) 1936 Berlin | Cycling | Men's sprint |
| Gold | Ernst Ihbe; Carl Lorenz | (Germany) 1936 Berlin | Cycling | Men's tandem |
| Bronze | Rudolf Karsch | (Germany) 1936 Berlin | Cycling | Men's 1000 metres time trial |
| Bronze | Edi Ziegler | (Finland) 1952 Helsinki | Cycling | Men's road race individual |
| Bronze | Werner Potzernheim | (Finland) 1952 Helsinki | Cycling | Men's sprint |
| Gold | Michael Rich; Bernd Dittert; Christian Meyer; Uwe Peschel | (Spain) 1992 Barcelona | Cycling | Men's team time trial |
| Gold | Stefan Steinweg; Andreas Walzer; Guido Fulst; Michael Glöckner; Jens Lehmann | (Spain) 1992 Barcelona | Cycling | Men's team pursuit |
| Gold | Jens Fiedler | (Spain) 1992 Barcelona | Cycling | Men's sprint |
| Gold | Petra Rossner | (Spain) 1992 Barcelona | Cycling | Women's individual pursuit |
| Silver | Jens Lehmann | (Spain) 1992 Barcelona | Cycling | Men's individual pursuit |
| Silver | Annett Neumann | (Spain) 1992 Barcelona | Cycling | Women's sprint |
| Gold | Jens Fiedler | (United States) 1996 Atlanta | Cycling | Men's sprint |
| Bronze | Judith Arndt | (United States) 1996 Atlanta | Cycling | Women's individual pursuit |
| Gold | Jan Ullrich | (Australia) 2000 Sydney | Cycling | Men's road race individual |
| Gold | Robert Bartko | (Australia) 2000 Sydney | Cycling | Men's individual pursuit |
| Gold | Guido Fulst; Robert Bartko; Daniel Becke; Jens Lehmann | (Australia) 2000 Sydney | Cycling | Men's team pursuit |
| Silver | Jan Ullrich | (Australia) 2000 Sydney | Cycling | Men's time trial individual |
| Silver | Jens Lehmann | (Australia) 2000 Sydney | Cycling | Men's individual pursuit |
| Silver | Stefan Nimke | (Australia) 2000 Sydney | Cycling | Men's 1000 metres time trial |
| Silver | Hanka Kupfernagel | (Australia) 2000 Sydney | Cycling | Women's road race individual |
| Bronze | Andreas Klöden | (Australia) 2000 Sydney | Cycling | Men's road race individual |
| Bronze | Jens Fiedler | (Australia) 2000 Sydney | Cycling | Men's keirin |
| Bronze | Jens Fiedler | (Australia) 2000 Sydney | Cycling | Men's sprint |
| Gold | Jens Fiedler; Stefan Nimke; René Wolff | (Greece) 2004 Athens | Cycling | Men's team sprint |
| Silver | Judith Arndt | (Greece) 2004 Athens | Cycling | Women's road race individual |
| Bronze | Guido Fulst | (Greece) 2004 Athens | Cycling | Men's points race |
| Bronze | René Wolff | (Greece) 2004 Athens | Cycling | Men's sprint |
| Bronze | Stefan Nimke | (Greece) 2004 Athens | Cycling | Men's 1000 metres time trial |
| Bronze | Sabine Spitz | (Greece) 2004 Athens | Cycling | Women's cross-country |
| Gold | Sabine Spitz | (China) 2008 Beijing | Cycling | Women's cross-country |
| Silver | Roger Kluge | (China) 2008 Beijing | Cycling | Men's points race |
| Bronze | René Enders; Maximilian Levy; Stefan Nimke | (China) 2008 Beijing | Cycling | Men's team sprint |
| Gold | Kristina Vogel; Miriam Welte | (United Kingdom) 2012 London | Cycling | Women's team sprint |
| Silver | Tony Martin | (United Kingdom) 2012 London | Cycling | Men's time trial individual |
| Silver | Maximilian Levy | (United Kingdom) 2012 London | Cycling | Men's keirin |
| Silver | Judith Arndt | (United Kingdom) 2012 London | Cycling | Women's time trial individual |
| Silver | Sabine Spitz | (United Kingdom) 2012 London | Cycling | Women's cross-country |
| Bronze | René Enders; Maximilian Levy; Robert Förstemann | (United Kingdom) 2012 London | Cycling | Men's team sprint |
| Gold | Kristina Vogel | (Brazil) 2016 Rio de Janeiro | Cycling | Women's sprint |
| Bronze | Kristina Vogel; Miriam Welte | (Brazil) 2016 Rio de Janeiro | Cycling | Women's team sprint |
| Gold | Franziska Brauße; Lisa Brennauer; Lisa Klein; Mieke Kröger | (Japan) 2020 Tokyo | Cycling | Women's team pursuit |
| Silver | Lea Sophie Friedrich; Emma Hinze | (Japan) 2020 Tokyo | Cycling | Women's team sprint |
| Silver | Lea Sophie Friedrich | (France) 2024 Paris | Cycling | Women's sprint |
| Bronze | Lea Sophie Friedrich; Pauline Grabosch; Emma Hinze | (France) 2024 Paris | Cycling | Women's team sprint |

=== Diving ===
| Medal | Name | Games | Sport | Event |
|---|---|---|---|---|
| Silver | Georg Hoffmann | (United States) 1904 St. Louis | Diving | Men's 10 metre platform |
| Bronze | Alfred Braunschweiger | (United States) 1904 St. Louis | Diving | Men's 10 metre platform |
| Gold | Albert Zürner | (United Kingdom) 1908 London | Diving | Men's 3 metre springboard |
| Silver | Kurt Behrens | (United Kingdom) 1908 London | Diving | Men's 3 metre springboard |
| Bronze | Gottlob Walz | (United Kingdom) 1908 London | Diving | Men's 3 metre springboard |
| Gold | Paul Günther | (Sweden) 1912 Stockholm | Diving | Men's 3 metre springboard |
| Silver | Hans Luber | (Sweden) 1912 Stockholm | Diving | Men's 3 metre springboard |
| Silver | Albert Zürner | (Sweden) 1912 Stockholm | Diving | Men's 10 metre platform |
| Bronze | Kurt Behrens | (Sweden) 1912 Stockholm | Diving | Men's 3 metre springboard |
| Bronze | Hermann Stork | (Germany) 1936 Berlin | Diving | Men's 10 metre platform |
| Bronze | Käthe Köhler | (Germany) 1936 Berlin | Diving | Women's 10 metre platform |
| Bronze | Günther Haase | (Finland) 1952 Helsinki | Diving | Men's 10 metre platform |
| Bronze | Brita Baldus | (Spain) 1992 Barcelona | Diving | Women's 3 metre springboard |
| Silver | Jan Hempel | (United States) 1996 Atlanta | Diving | Men's 10 metre platform |
| Silver | Annika Walter | (United States) 1996 Atlanta | Diving | Women's 10 metre platform |
| Bronze | Jan Hempel; Heiko Meyer | (Australia) 2000 Sydney | Diving | Men's synchronized 10 metre platform |
| Bronze | Dörte Lindner | (Australia) 2000 Sydney | Diving | Women's 3 metre springboard |
| Silver | Andreas Wels; Tobias Schellenberg | (Greece) 2004 Athens | Diving | Men's synchronized 3 metre springboard |
| Silver | Patrick Hausding; Sascha Klein | (China) 2008 Beijing | Diving | Men's synchronized 10 metre platform |
| Bronze | Ditte Kotzian; Heike Fischer | (China) 2008 Beijing | Diving | Women's synchronized 3 metre springboard |
| Bronze | Patrick Hausding | (Brazil) 2016 Rio de Janeiro | Diving | Men's 3 metre springboard |
| Bronze | Lena Hentschel; Tina Punzel | (Japan) 2020 Tokyo | Diving | Women's synchronized 3 metre springboard |
| Bronze | Patrick Hausding; Lars Rüdiger | (Japan) 2020 Tokyo | Diving | Men's synchronized 3 metre springboard |

=== Equestrian ===
| Medal | Name | Games | Sport | Event |
|---|---|---|---|---|
| Silver | Friedrich von Rochow | (Sweden) 1912 Stockholm | Equestrian | Eventing, individual |
| Silver | Rabod von Kröcher | (Sweden) 1912 Stockholm | Equestrian | Jumping, individual |
| Silver | Friedrich von Rochow; Richard Graf von Schaesberg-Tannheim; Eduard von Lütcken; Carl von Moers | (Sweden) 1912 Stockholm | Equestrian | Eventing, team |
| Bronze | Sigismund Freyer; Ernst Deloch; Wilhelm Graf von Hohenau; Prinz Friedrich Karl von Preußen | (Sweden) 1912 Stockholm | Equestrian | Jumping, team |
| Gold | Carl Freiherr von Langen | (Netherlands) 1928 Amsterdam | Equestrian | Dressage, individual |
| Gold | Carl Freiherr von Langen; Hermann Linkenbach; Eugen Freiherr von Lotzbeck | (Netherlands) 1928 Amsterdam | Equestrian | Dressage, team |
| Bronze | Bruno Neumann | (Netherlands) 1928 Amsterdam | Equestrian | Eventing, individual |
| Gold | Ludwig Stubbendorf; Rudolf Lippert; Konrad Freiherr von Wangenheim | (Germany) 1936 Berlin | Equestrian | Eventing, team |
| Gold | Kurt Hasse | (Germany) 1936 Berlin | Equestrian | Jumping, individual |
| Gold | Ludwig Stubbendorf | (Germany) 1936 Berlin | Equestrian | Eventing, individual |
| Gold | Heinz Pollay | (Germany) 1936 Berlin | Equestrian | Dressage, individual |
| Gold | Heinz Pollay; Friedrich Gerhard; Hermann von Oppeln-Bronikowski | (Germany) 1936 Berlin | Equestrian | Dressage, team |
| Gold | Kurt Hasse; Marten von Barnekow; Heinz Brandt | (Germany) 1936 Berlin | Equestrian | Jumping, team |
| Silver | Friedrich Gerhard | (Germany) 1936 Berlin | Equestrian | Dressage, individual |
| Silver | Wilhelm Büsing; Klaus Wagner; Otto Rothe | (Finland) 1952 Helsinki | Equestrian | Eventing, team |
| Bronze | Wilhelm Büsing | (Finland) 1952 Helsinki | Equestrian | Eventing, individual |
| Bronze | Fritz Thiedemann | (Finland) 1952 Helsinki | Equestrian | Jumping, individual |
| Bronze | Heinz Pollay; Ida von Nagel; Fritz Thiedemann | (Finland) 1952 Helsinki | Equestrian | Dressage, team |
| Gold | Nicole Uphoff | (Spain) 1992 Barcelona | Equestrian | Dressage, individual |
| Gold | Ludger Beerbaum | (Spain) 1992 Barcelona | Equestrian | Jumping, individual |
| Gold | Klaus Balkenhol; Monica Theodorescu; Nicole Uphoff; Isabell Werth | (Spain) 1992 Barcelona | Equestrian | Dressage, team |
| Silver | Herbert Blocker | (Spain) 1992 Barcelona | Equestrian | Eventing, individual |
| Silver | Isabell Werth | (Spain) 1992 Barcelona | Equestrian | Dressage, individual |
| Bronze | Klaus Balkenhol | (Spain) 1992 Barcelona | Equestrian | Dressage, individual |
| Bronze | Herbert Bloecker; Ralf Ehrenbrink; Matthias Baumann; Cord Mysegages | (Spain) 1992 Barcelona | Equestrian | Eventing, team |
| Gold | Ulrich Kirchhoff | (United States) 1996 Atlanta | Equestrian | Jumping, individual |
| Gold | Isabell Werth | (United States) 1996 Atlanta | Equestrian | Dressage, individual |
| Gold | Franke Sloothaak; Lars Nieberg; Ulrich Kirchhoff; Ludger Beerbaum | (United States) 1996 Atlanta | Equestrian | Jumping, team |
| Gold | Klaus Balkenhol; Monica Theodorescu; Martin Schaudt; Isabell Werth | (United States) 1996 Atlanta | Equestrian | Dressage, team |
| Gold | Isabell Werth; Nadine Capellmann; Alexandra Simons de Ridder; Ulla Salzgeber | (Australia) 2000 Sydney | Equestrian | Dressage, team |
| Gold | Ludger Beerbaum; Lars Nieberg; Marcus Ehning; Otto Becker | (Australia) 2000 Sydney | Equestrian | Jumping, team |
| Silver | Isabell Werth | (Australia) 2000 Sydney | Equestrian | Dressage, individual |
| Bronze | Ulla Salzgeber | (Australia) 2000 Sydney | Equestrian | Dressage, individual |
| Gold | Ulla Salzgeber; Martin Schaudt; Hubertus Schmidt; Heike Kemmer | (Greece) 2004 Athens | Equestrian | Dressage, team |
| Silver | Ulla Salzgeber | (Greece) 2004 Athens | Equestrian | Dressage, individual |
| Bronze | Marco Kutscher | (Greece) 2004 Athens | Equestrian | Jumping, individual |
| Bronze | Marco Kutscher; Otto Becker; Christian Ahlmann | (Greece) 2004 Athens | Equestrian | Jumping, team |
| Gold | Hinrich Romeike | (China) 2008 Beijing | Equestrian | Eventing, individual |
| Gold | Hinrich Romeike; Peter Thomsen; Frank Ostholt; Andreas Dibowski; Ingrid Klimke | (China) 2008 Beijing | Equestrian | Eventing, team |
| Gold | Isabell Werth; Nadine Capellmann; Heike Kemmer | (China) 2008 Beijing | Equestrian | Dressage, team |
| Silver | Isabell Werth | (China) 2008 Beijing | Equestrian | Dressage, individual |
| Bronze | Heike Kemmer | (China) 2008 Beijing | Equestrian | Dressage, individual |
| Gold | Michael Jung; Peter Thomsen; Sandra Auffarth; Dirk Schrade; Ingrid Klimke | (United Kingdom) 2012 London | Equestrian | Eventing, team |
| Gold | Michael Jung | (United Kingdom) 2012 London | Equestrian | Eventing, individual |
| Silver | Kristina Bröring-Sprehe; Dorothee Schneider; Helen Langehanenberg | (United Kingdom) 2012 London | Equestrian | Dressage, team |
| Bronze | Sandra Auffarth | (United Kingdom) 2012 London | Equestrian | Eventing, individual |
| Gold | Isabell Werth; Dorothee Schneider; Sönke Rothenberger; Kristina Bröring-Sprehe | (Brazil) 2016 Rio de Janeiro | Equestrian | Dressage, team |
| Gold | Michael Jung | (Brazil) 2016 Rio de Janeiro | Equestrian | Eventing, individual |
| Silver | Michael Jung; Sandra Auffarth; Julia Krajewski; Ingrid Klimke | (Brazil) 2016 Rio de Janeiro | Equestrian | Eventing, team |
| Silver | Isabell Werth | (Brazil) 2016 Rio de Janeiro | Equestrian | Dressage, individual |
| Bronze | Kristina Bröring-Sprehe | (Brazil) 2016 Rio de Janeiro | Equestrian | Dressage, individual |
| Bronze | Meredith Michaels-Beerbaum; Christian Ahlmann; Ludger Beerbaum; Daniel Deusser | (Brazil) 2016 Rio de Janeiro | Equestrian | Jumping, team |
| Gold | Julia Krajewski | (Japan) 2020 Tokyo | Equestrian | Eventing, individual |
| Gold | Isabell Werth; Dorothee Schneider; Jessica von Bredow-Werndl | (Japan) 2020 Tokyo | Equestrian | Dressage, team |
| Gold | Jessica von Bredow-Werndl | (Japan) 2020 Tokyo | Equestrian | Dressage, individual |
| Silver | Isabell Werth | (Japan) 2020 Tokyo | Equestrian | Dressage, individual |
| Gold | Michael Jung | (France) 2024 Paris | Equestrian | Eventing, individual |
| Gold | Jessica von Bredow-Werndl; Frederic Wandres; Isabell Werth | (France) 2024 Paris | Equestrian | Dressage, team |
| Gold | Jessica von Bredow-Werndl | (France) 2024 Paris | Equestrian | Dressage, individual |
| Gold | Christian Kukuk | (France) 2024 Paris | Equestrian | Jumping, individual |
| Silver | Isabell Werth | (France) 2024 Paris | Equestrian | Dressage, individual |

=== Fencing ===
| Medal | Name | Games | Sport | Event |
|---|---|---|---|---|
| Gold | Helene Mayer | (Netherlands) 1928 Amsterdam | Fencing | Women's Foil, Individual |
| Silver | Erwin Casmir | (Netherlands) 1928 Amsterdam | Fencing | Men's Foil, Individual |
| Bronze | Olga Oelkers | (Netherlands) 1928 Amsterdam | Fencing | Women's Foil, Individual |
| Silver | Helene Mayer | (Germany) 1936 Berlin | Fencing | Women's Foil, Individual |
| Bronze | Siegfried Lerdon; August Heim; Erwin Casmir; Julius Eisenecker; Otto Adam; Stefan Rosenbauer | (Germany) 1936 Berlin | Fencing | Men's Foil, Team |
| Bronze | Hans Jörger; August Heim; Julius Eisenecker; Erwin Casmir; Hans Esser; Richard Wahl | (Germany) 1936 Berlin | Fencing | Men's Sabre, Team |
| Gold | Alexander Koch; Thorsten Weidner; Ulrich Schreck; Udo Wagner; Ingo Weißenborn | (Spain) 1992 Barcelona | Fencing | Men's Foil, Team |
| Gold | Wladimir Resnitschenko; Uwe Proske; Arnd Schmitt; Robert Felisiak; Elmar Borrmann | (Spain) 1992 Barcelona | Fencing | Men's Épée, Team |
| Silver | Sabine Bau; Zita-Eva Funkenhauser; Annette Dobmeier; Anja Fichtel-Mauritz; Monika Weber-Koszto | (Spain) 1992 Barcelona | Fencing | Women's Foil, Team |
| Bronze | Sabine Bau; Anja Fichtel-Mauritz; Monika Weber-Koszto | (United States) 1996 Atlanta | Fencing | Women's Foil, Team |
| Silver | Rita König | (Australia) 2000 Sydney | Fencing | Women's Foil, Individual |
| Silver | Ralf Bissdorf | (Australia) 2000 Sydney | Fencing | Men's Foil, Individual |
| Bronze | Dennis Bauer; Wiradech Kothny; Alexander Weber | (Australia) 2000 Sydney | Fencing | Men's Sabre, Team |
| Bronze | Sabine Bau; Rita König; Monika Weber-Koszto | (Australia) 2000 Sydney | Fencing | Women's Foil, Team |
| Bronze | Wiradech Kothny | (Australia) 2000 Sydney | Fencing | Men's Sabre, Individual |
| Silver | Claudia Bokel; Imke Duplitzer; Britta Heidemann | (Greece) 2004 Athens | Fencing | Women's Épée, Team |
| Bronze | Sven Schmid; Jörg Fiedler; Daniel Strigel | (Greece) 2004 Athens | Fencing | Men's Épée, Team |
| Gold | Britta Heidemann | (China) 2008 Beijing | Fencing | Women's Épée, Individual |
| Gold | Benjamin Kleibrink | (China) 2008 Beijing | Fencing | Men's Foil, Individual |
| Silver | Britta Heidemann | (United Kingdom) 2012 London | Fencing | Women's Épée, Individual |
| Bronze | Peter Joppich; André Weßels; Sebastian Bachmann; Benjamin Kleibrink | (United Kingdom) 2012 London | Fencing | Men's Foil, Team |

=== Field Hockey ===
| Medal | Name | Games | Sport | Event |
|---|---|---|---|---|
| Bronze | Bruno Boche; Georg Brunner; Heinz Förstendorf; Erwin Franzkowiak; Werner Freyberg; Theodor Haag; Hans Haußmann; Kurt Haverbeck; Aribert Heymann; Herbert Hobein; Fritz Horn; Karl-Heinz Irmer; Herbert Kemmer; Herbert Müller; Werner Proft; Gerd Strantzen; Rolf Wollner; Heinz Wöltje; Erich Zander Fritz Lincke; Heinz Schäfer; Kurt Weiß | (Netherlands) 1928 Amsterdam | Field Hockey | Men's Field Hockey |
| Silver | Hermann auf der Heide; Ludwig Beisiegel; Erich Cuntz; Karl Dröse; Alfred Gerdes; Werner Hamel; Harald Huffmann; Erwin Keller; Herbert Kemmer; Werner Kubitzki; Paul Mehlitz; Karl Menke; Fritz Messner; Detlef Okrent; Heinrich Peter; Heinz Raack; Carl Ruck; Hans Scherbart; Heinz Schmalix; Tito Warnholtz; Kurt Weiß; Erich Zander | (Germany) 1936 Berlin | Field Hockey | Men's Field Hockey |
| Gold | Andreas Becker; Christian Blunck; Carsten Fischer; Volker Fried; Michael Hilgers; Andreas Keller; Michael Knauth; Oliver Kurtz; Christian Mayerhöfer; Sven Meinhardt; Michael Metz; Klaus Michler; Christopher Reitz; Stefan Saliger; Jan-Peter Tewes; Stefan Tewes | (Spain) 1992 Barcelona | Field Hockey | Men's Field Hockey |
| Silver | Britta Becker; Tanja Dickenscheid; Nadine Ernsting-Krienke; Christine Ferneck; Eva Hagenbäumer; Franziska Hentschel; Caren Jungjohann; Katrin Kauschke; Irina Kuhnt; Heike Lätzsch; Susanne Müller; Tina Peters; Simone Thomaschinski; Bianca Weiß; Anke Wild; Susie Wollschläger | (Spain) 1992 Barcelona | Field Hockey | Women's Field Hockey |
| Gold | Tina Bachmann; Caroline Casaretto; Nadine Ernsting-Krienke; Franziska Gude; Mandy Haase; Natascha Keller; Denise Klecker; Anke Kühn; Heike Lätzsch; Badri Latif; Sonja Lehmann; Silke Müller; Fanny Rinne; Marion Rodewald; Louisa Walter; Julia Zwehl | (Greece) 2004 Athens | Field Hockey | Women's Field Hockey |
| Bronze | Clemens Arnold; Christoph Bechmann; Sebastian Biederlack; Philipp Crone; Eike Duckwitz; Christoph Eimer; Björn Emmerling; Florian Kunz; Björn Michel; Sascha Reinelt; Justus Scharowsky; Christian Schulte; Tibor Weißenborn; Timo Weß; Matthias Witthaus; Christopher Zeller | (Greece) 2004 Athens | Field Hockey | Men's Field Hockey |
| Gold | Philip Witte; Maximilian Müller; Sebastian Biederlack; Carlos Nevado; Moritz Fürste; Jan-Marco Montag; Tobias Hauke; Tibor Weißenborn; Benjamin Weß; Niklas Meinert; Timo Weß; Oliver Korn; Christopher Zeller; Max Weinhold; Matthias Witthaus; Florian Keller; Philipp Zeller | (China) 2008 Beijing | Field Hockey | Men's Field Hockey |
| Gold | Maximilian Müller; Martin Häner; Oskar Deecke; Christopher Wesley; Moritz Fürste; Tobias Hauke; Jan-Philipp Rabente; Benjamin Weß; Timo Weß; Oliver Korn; Christopher Zeller; Max Weinhold; Matthias Witthaus; Florian Fuchs; Philipp Zeller; Thilo Stralkowski | (United Kingdom) 2012 London | Field Hockey | Men's Field Hockey |
| Bronze | Nicolas Jacobi; Matthias Müller; Linus Butt; Martin Häner; Moritz Trompertz; Mats Grambusch; Christopher Wesley; Timm Herzbruch; Tobias Hauke; Tom Grambusch; Christopher Rühr; Martin Zwicker; Moritz Fürste; Florian Fuchs; Timur Oruz; Niklas Wellen | (Brazil) 2016 Rio de Janeiro | Field Hockey | Men's Field Hockey |
| Bronze | Nike Lorenz; Selin Oruz; Anne Schröder; Lisa Schütze; Charlotte Stapenhorst; Katharina Otte; Janne Müller-Wieland; Hannah Krüger; Jana Teschke; Lisa Altenburg; Franzisca Hauke; Cécile Pieper; Marie Mävers; Annika Sprink; Julia Müller; Pia-Sophie Oldhafer; Kristina Reynolds | (Brazil) 2016 Rio de Janeiro | Field Hockey | Women's Field Hockey |
| Silver | Jean Danneberg; Mats Grambusch; Tom Grambusch; Johannes Große; Malte Hellwig; Teo Hinrichs; Paul-Philipp Kaufmann; Moritz Ludwig; Marco Miltkau; Hannes Müller; Mathias Müller; Gonzalo Peillat; Thies Prinz; Christopher Rühr; Justus Weigand; Niklas Wellen; Lukas Windfeder; Martin Zwicker | (France) 2024 Paris | Field Hockey | Men's Field Hockey |

=== Figure Skating ===
| Medal | Name | Games | Sport | Event |
|---|---|---|---|---|
| Gold | Anna Hübler; Heinrich Burger | (United Kingdom) 1908 London | Figure Skating | Pairs |
| Silver | Elsa Rendschmidt | (United Kingdom) 1908 London | Figure Skating | Ladies' Singles |

=== Football ===
| Medal | Name | Games | Sport | Event |
|---|---|---|---|---|
| Bronze | Ariane Hingst; Melanie Hoffmann; Steffi Jones; Renate Lingor; Maren Meinert; Sandra Minnert; Claudia Mueller; Birgit Prinz; Silke Rottenberg; Kerstin Stegemann; Bettina Wiegmann; Tina Wunderlich; Nicole Brandebusemeyer; Nadine Angerer; Doris Fitschen; Jeannette Goette; Stefanie Gottschlich; Inka Grings | (Australia) 2000 Sydney | Football | Women's Tournament |
| Bronze | Silke Rottenberg; Kerstin Stegemann; Kerstin Garefrekes; Steffi Jones; Sarah Günther; Viola Odebrecht; Pia Wunderlich; Petra Wimbersky; Birgit Prinz; Renate Lingor; Martina Müller; Navina Omilade; Sandra Minnert; Isabell Bachor; Sonja Fuss; Conny Pohlers; Ariane Hingst; Nadine Angerer | (Greece) 2004 Athens | Football | Women's Tournament |
| Bronze | Nadine Angerer; Kerstin Stegemann; Saskia Bartusiak; Babett Peter; Annike Krahn; Linda Bresonik; Melanie Behringer; Sandra Smisek; Birgit Prinz; Renate Lingor; Anja Mittag; Ursula Holl; Célia Okoyino da Mbabi; Simone Laudehr; Fatmire Bajramaj; Conny Pohlers; Ariane Hingst; Kerstin Garefrekes | (China) 2008 Beijing | Football | Women's Tournament |
| Gold | Almuth Schult; Josephine Henning; Saskia Bartusiak; Leonie Maier; Annike Krahn; Simone Laudehr; Melanie Behringer; Lena Goeßling; Alexandra Popp; Dzsenifer Marozsán; Anja Mittag; Tabea Kemme; Sara Däbritz; Babett Peter; Mandy Islacker; Melanie Leupolz; Isabel Kerschowski; Laura Benkarth; Svenja Huth | (Brazil) 2016 Rio de Janeiro | Football | Women's Tournament |
| Silver | Timo Horn; Jeremy Toljan; Lukas Klostermann; Matthias Ginter; Niklas Süle; Sven Bender; Max Meyer; Lars Bender; Davie Selke; Leon Goretzka; Julian Brandt; Jannik Huth; Philipp Max; Robert Bauer; Max Christiansen; Grischa Prömel; Serge Gnabry; Nils Petersen; Eric Oelschlägel | (Brazil) 2016 Rio de Janeiro | Football | Men's Tournament |
| Bronze | Nicole Anyomi; Ann-Katrin Berger; Jule Brand; Klara Bühl; Sara Doorsoun; Vivien Endemann; Laura Freigang; Merle Frohms; Giulia Gwinn; Marina Hegering; Kathrin Hendrich; Sarai Linder; Sydney Lohmann; Janina Minge; Sjoeke Nüsken; Alexandra Popp; Felicitas Rauch; Lea Schüller; Bibiane Schulze; Elisa Senß | (France) 2024 Paris | Football | Women's Tournament |

=== Golf ===
| Medal | Name | Games | Sport | Event |
|---|---|---|---|---|
| Silver | Esther Henseleit | (France) 2024 Paris | Golf | Women's individual |

=== Gymnastics ===
| Medal | Name | Games | Sport | Event |
|---|---|---|---|---|
| Gold | Carl Schuhmann | (Greece) 1896 Athens | Gymnastics | Vault |
| Gold | Hermann Weingärtner | (Greece) 1896 Athens | Gymnastics | Horizontal Bar |
| Gold | Alfred Flatow | (Greece) 1896 Athens | Gymnastics | Parallel Bars |
| Gold | Konrad Böcker; Alfred Flatow; Gustav Flatow; Georg Hilmar; Fritz Hofmann; Fritz Manteuffel; Karl Neukirch; Richard Röstel; Gustav Schuft; Carl Schuhmann; Hermann Weingärtner | (Greece) 1896 Athens | Gymnastics | Team Parallel Bars |
| Gold | Konrad Böcker; Alfred Flatow; Gustav Flatow; Georg Hilmar; Fritz Hofmann; Fritz Manteuffel; Karl Neukirch; Richard Röstel; Gustav Schuft; Carl Schuhmann; Hermann Weingärtner | (Greece) 1896 Athens | Gymnastics | Team Horizontal Bar |
| Silver | Alfred Flatow | (Greece) 1896 Athens | Gymnastics | Horizontal Bar |
| Silver | Hermann Weingärtner | (Greece) 1896 Athens | Gymnastics | Rings |
| Silver | Hermann Weingärtner | (Greece) 1896 Athens | Gymnastics | Pommel Horse |
| Bronze | Fritz Hofmann | (Greece) 1896 Athens | Gymnastics | Rope Climbing |
| Bronze | Hermann Weingärtner | (Greece) 1896 Athens | Gymnastics | Vault |
| Silver | Wilhelm Weber | (United States) 1904 St. Louis | Gymnastics | Individual All-Around |
| Bronze | Wilhelm Weber | (United States) 1904 St. Louis | Gymnastics | Gymnastic Triathlon |
| Gold | Alfred Schwarzmann | (Germany) 1936 Berlin | Gymnastics | Individual All-Around |
| Gold | Konrad Frey | (Germany) 1936 Berlin | Gymnastics | Parallel Bars |
| Gold | Konrad Frey | (Germany) 1936 Berlin | Gymnastics | Pommel Horse |
| Gold | Alfred Schwarzmann | (Germany) 1936 Berlin | Gymnastics | Vault |
| Gold | Franz Beckert; Konrad Frey; Alfred Schwarzmann; Willi Stadel; Inno Stangl; Walter Steffens; Matthias Volz; Ernst Winter | (Germany) 1936 Berlin | Gymnastics | Men's Team All-Around |
| Gold | Anita Bärwirth; Erna Bürger; Isolde Frölian; Friedl Iby; Trudi Meyer; Paula Pöhlsen; Julie Schmitt; Käthe Sohnemann | (Germany) 1936 Berlin | Gymnastics | Women's Team All-Around |
| Silver | Konrad Frey | (Germany) 1936 Berlin | Gymnastics | Horizontal Bar |
| Bronze | Konrad Frey | (Germany) 1936 Berlin | Gymnastics | Floor Exercise |
| Bronze | Konrad Frey | (Germany) 1936 Berlin | Gymnastics | Individual All-Around |
| Bronze | Alfred Schwarzmann | (Germany) 1936 Berlin | Gymnastics | Horizontal Bar |
| Bronze | Alfred Schwarzmann | (Germany) 1936 Berlin | Gymnastics | Parallel Bars |
| Bronze | Matthias Volz | (Germany) 1936 Berlin | Gymnastics | Rings |
| Bronze | Matthias Volz | (Germany) 1936 Berlin | Gymnastics | Vault |
| Silver | Alfred Schwarzmann | (Finland) 1952 Helsinki | Gymnastics | Horizontal Bar |
| Silver | Andreas Wecker | (Spain) 1992 Barcelona | Gymnastics | Horizontal Bar |
| Bronze | Andreas Wecker | (Spain) 1992 Barcelona | Gymnastics | Pommel Horse |
| Bronze | Andreas Wecker | (Spain) 1992 Barcelona | Gymnastics | Rings |
| Gold | Andreas Wecker | (United States) 1996 Atlanta | Gymnastics | Horizontal Bar |
| Gold | Anna Dogonadze | (Greece) 2004 Athens | Trampoline | Trampoline (W) Individual |
| Bronze | Henrik Stehlik | (Greece) 2004 Athens | Trampoline | Trampoline (M) Individual |
| Silver | Oksana Chusovitina | (China) 2008 Beijing | Gymnastics | Vault |
| Bronze | Fabian Hambüchen | (China) 2008 Beijing | Gymnastics | Horizontal Bar |
| Silver | Marcel Nguyen | (United Kingdom) 2012 London | Gymnastics | Parallel Bars |
| Silver | Marcel Nguyen | (United Kingdom) 2012 London | Gymnastics | Individual All-Around |
| Silver | Fabian Hambüchen | (United Kingdom) 2012 London | Gymnastics | Horizontal Bar |
| Gold | Fabian Hambüchen | (Brazil) 2016 Rio de Janeiro | Gymnastics | Horizontal Bar |
| Bronze | Sophie Scheder | (Brazil) 2016 Rio de Janeiro | Gymnastics | Uneven Bar |
| Silver | Lukas Dauser | (Japan) 2020 Tokyo | Gymnastics | Parallel Bars |
| Gold | Darja Varfolomeev | (France) 2024 Paris | Gymnastics | Rhythmic Individual All-Around |

=== Handball ===
| Medal | Name | Games | Sport | Event |
|---|---|---|---|---|
| Gold | Willy Bandholz; Wilhelm Baumann; Helmut Berthold; Helmut Braselmann; Wilhelm Brinkmann; Georg Dascher; Kurt Dossin; Fritz Fromm; Hermann Hansen; Erich Herrmann; Heinrich Keimig; Hans Keiter; Alfred Klingler; Artur Knautz; Heinz Körvers; Karl Kreutzberg; Wilhelm Müller; Günther Ortmann; Edgar Reinhardt; Fritz Spengler; Rudolf Stahl; Hans Theilig | (Germany) 1936 Berlin | Handball | Men's Tournament |
| Silver | Markus Baur; Frank von Behren; Mark Dragunski; Henning Fritz; Pascal Hens; Jan Olaf Immel; Torsten Jansen; Florian Kehrmann; Stefan Kretzschmar; Klaus-Dieter Petersen; Christian Ramota; Christian Schwarzer; Daniel Stephan; Christian Zeitz; Volker Zerbe | (Greece) 2004 Athens | Handball | Men's Tournament |
| Bronze | Uwe Gensheimer; Finn Lemke; Patrick Wiencek; Tobias Reichmann; Fabian Wiede; Silvio Heinevetter; Hendrik Pekeler; Steffen Weinhold; Martin Strobel; Patrick Groetzki; Kai Häfner; Andreas Wolff; Julius Kühn; Christian Dissinger; Paul Drux | (Brazil) 2016 Rio de Janeiro | Handball | Men's Tournament |
| Silver | Rune Dahmke; Justus Fischer; Johannes Golla; Marko Grgić; Kai Häfner; Sebastian Heymann; Tim Hornke; Juri Knorr; Jannik Kohlbacher; Lukas Mertens; David Späth; Christoph Steinert; Renārs Uščins; Luca Witzke; Andreas Wolff | (France) 2024 Paris | Handball | Men's Tournament |

=== Judo ===
| Medal | Name | Games | Sport | Event |
|---|---|---|---|---|
| Bronze | Richard Trautmann | (Spain) 1992 Barcelona | Judo | Men's extra lightweight (-60 kg) |
| Bronze | Udo Quellmalz | (Spain) 1992 Barcelona | Judo | Men's half lightweight (-65 kg) |
| Gold | Udo Quellmalz | (United States) 1996 Atlanta | Judo | Men's half lightweight (-65 kg) |
| Bronze | Richard Trautmann | (United States) 1996 Atlanta | Judo | Men's extra lightweight (-60 kg) |
| Bronze | Marko Spittka | (United States) 1996 Atlanta | Judo | Men's middleweight (-86 kg) |
| Bronze | Johanna Hagn | (United States) 1996 Atlanta | Judo | Women's heavyweight (70 kg+) |
| Bronze | Frank Möller | (United States) 1996 Atlanta | Judo | Men's heavyweight (95 kg+) |
| Bronze | Anna-Maria Gradante | (Australia) 2000 Sydney | Judo | Women's extra lightweight (-48 kg) |
| Gold | Yvonne Bönisch | (Greece) 2004 Athens | Judo | Women's lightweight (-57 kg) |
| Bronze | Julia Matijass | (Greece) 2004 Athens | Judo | Women's extra lightweight (-48 kg) |
| Bronze | Annett Böhm | (Greece) 2004 Athens | Judo | Women's middleweight (-70 kg) |
| Bronze | Michael Jurack | (Greece) 2004 Athens | Judo | Men's half heavyweight (-100 kg) |
| Gold | Ole Bischof | (China) 2008 Beijing | Judo | Men's half middleweight (-81 kg) |
| Silver | Ole Bischof | (United Kingdom) 2012 London | Judo | Men's half middleweight (-81 kg) |
| Silver | Kerstin Thiele | (United Kingdom) 2012 London | Judo | Women's middleweight (-70 kg) |
| Bronze | Dimitri Peters | (United Kingdom) 2012 London | Judo | Men's half heavyweight (-100 kg) |
| Bronze | Andreas Tölzer | (United Kingdom) 2012 London | Judo | Men's heavyweight (100 kg+) |
| Bronze | Laura Vargas Koch | (Brazil) 2016 Rio de Janeiro | Judo | Women's middleweight (-70 kg) |
| Silver | Eduard Trippel | (Japan) 2020 Tokyo | Judo | Men's middleweight (-90 kg) |
| Bronze | Anna-Maria Wagner | (Japan) 2020 Tokyo | Judo | Women's half heavyweight (-78 kg) |
| Bronze | Giovanna Scoccimarro; Dominic Ressel; Anna-Maria Wagner; Karl-Richard Frey; Theresa Stoll; Sebastian Seidl; Jasmin Grabowski; Katharina Menz; Martyna Trajdos; Eduard Trippel; Igor Wandtke; Johannes Frey | (Japan) 2020 Tokyo | Judo | Team |
| Silver | Miriam Butkereit | (France) 2024 Paris | Judo | Women's middleweight (-70 kg) |

=== Modern pentathlon ===
| Medal | Name | Games | Sport | Event |
|---|---|---|---|---|
| Bronze | Helmuth Kahl | (Netherlands) 1928 Amsterdam | Modern pentathlon | Men's individual |
| Gold | Gotthard Handrick | (Germany) 1936 Berlin | Modern pentathlon | Men's individual |
| Gold | Lena Schöneborn | (China) 2008 Beijing | Modern pentathlon | Women's individual |

=== Rowing ===
| Medal | Name | Games | Sport | Event |
|---|---|---|---|---|
| Gold | Gustav Goßler; Oscar Goßler; Walther Katzenstein; Waldemar Tietgens; Carl Goßler | (France) 1900 Paris | Rowing | Men's coxed four |
| Bronze | Wilhelm Carstens; Julius Körner; Adolf Möller; Hugo Rüster; Max Ammermann | (France) 1900 Paris | Rowing | Men's coxed four |
| Bronze | Ernst Felle; Otto Fickeisen; Carl Lehle; Hermann Wilker; Franz Kröwerath | (France) 1900 Paris | Rowing | Men's coxed four |
| Bronze | Bernhard von Gaza | (United Kingdom) 1908 London | Rowing | Men's single scull |
| Bronze | Martin Stahnke; Willy Düskow | (United Kingdom) 1908 London | Rowing | Men's coxless pair |
| Gold | Albert Arnheiter; Hermann Wilker; Otto Fickeisen; Rudolf Fickeisen; Karl Leister | (Sweden) 1912 Stockholm | Rowing | Men's coxed fours |
| Bronze | Otto Liebing; Max Bröske; Fritz Bartholomae; Willi Bartholomae; Werner Dehn; Rudolf Reichelt; Hans Matthiae; Kurt Runge; Max Vetter | (Sweden) 1912 Stockholm | Rowing | Men's eight |
| Gold | Kurt Moeschter; Bruno Möller | (Netherlands) 1928 Amsterdam | Rowing | Men's coxless pair |
| Gold | Hans Eller; Horst Hoeck; Walter Meyer; Carlheinz Neumann; Joachim Spremberg | (United States) 1932 Los Angeles | Rowing | Men's coxed four |
| Silver | Herbert Buhtz; Gerhard Boetzelen | (United States) 1932 Los Angeles | Rowing | Men's double sculls |
| Silver | Karl Aletter; Walter Flinsch, Ernst Gaber, Hans Maier | (United States) 1932 Los Angeles | Rowing | Men's coxless four |
| Gold | Gustav Schäfer | (Germany) 1936 Berlin | Rowing | Men's single sculls |
| Gold | Willi Eichhorn; Hugo Strauß | (Germany) 1936 Berlin | Rowing | Men's coxless pairs |
| Gold | Herbert Adamski; Dieter Arend; Gerhard Gustmann | (Germany) 1936 Berlin | Rowing | Men's coxed pairs |
| Gold | Rudolf Eckstein; Martin Karl; Willi Menne; Toni Rom | (Germany) 1936 Berlin | Rowing | Men's coxless fours |
| Gold | Fritz Bauer; Ernst Gaber; Hans Maier; Paul Söllner; Walter Volle | (Germany) 1936 Berlin | Rowing | Men's coxed fours |
| Silver | Willi Kaidel; Joachim Pirsch | (Germany) 1936 Berlin | Rowing | Men's double sculls |
| Bronze | Hans-Joachim Hannemann; Heinz Kaufmann; Hans Kuschke; Werner Loeckle; Wilhelm Mahlow; Helmut Radach; Alfred Rieck; Herbert Schmidt; Gerd Völs | (Germany) 1936 Berlin | Rowing | Men's eight |
| Silver | Heinz Manchen; Helmut Heinhold; Helmut Noll | (Finland) 1952 Helsinki | Rowing | Men's coxed pairs |
| Gold | Kerstin Müller; Kristina Mundt; Birgit Peter; Sybille Schmidt | (Spain) 1992 Barcelona | Rowing | Women's quadruple sculls |
| Gold | Thomas Lange | (Spain) 1992 Barcelona | Rowing | Men's single sculls |
| Gold | Andreas Hajek; Michael Steinbach; Stephan Volkert; André Willms | (Spain) 1992 Barcelona | Rowing | Men's quadruple sculls |
| Gold | Kerstin Köppen; Kathrin Boron | (Spain) 1992 Barcelona | Rowing | Women's double sculls |
| Silver | Ingeburg Schwerzmann; Stefani Werremeier | (Spain) 1992 Barcelona | Rowing | Women's coxless pair |
| Silver | Colin von Ettingshausen; Peter Hoeltzenbein | (Spain) 1992 Barcelona | Rowing | Men's coxless pair |
| Silver | Ralf Brudel; Karsten Finger; Uwe Kellner; Thoralf Peters; Hendrik Reiher | (Spain) 1992 Barcelona | Rowing | Men's coxed four |
| Bronze | Antje Frank; Annette Hohn; Gabriele Mehl; Birte Siech | (Spain) 1992 Barcelona | Rowing | Women's coxless four |
| Bronze | Sylvia Dördelmann; Kathrin Haacker; Christiane Harzendorf; Daniela Neunast; Cerstin Petersmann; Dana Pyritz; Annegret Strauch; Ute Schell; Judith Zeidler | (Spain) 1992 Barcelona | Rowing | Women's eight |
| Bronze | Roland Baar; Armin Eichholz; Detlef Kirchhoff; Manfred Klein; Bahne Rabe; Frank Richter; Hans Sennewald; Thorsten Streppelhoff; Ansgar Wessling | (Spain) 1992 Barcelona | Rowing | Men's eight |
| Gold | Andreas Hajek; André Steiner; Stephan Volkert; André Willms | (United States) 1996 Atlanta | Rowing | Men's quadruple sculls |
| Gold | Kathrin Boron; Kerstin Köppen; Katrin Rutschow; Jana Sorgers | (United States) 1996 Atlanta | Rowing | Women's quadruple sculls |
| Silver | Roland Baar; Wolfram Huhn; Detlef Kirchhoff; Mark Kleinschmidt; Frank Richter; Thorsten Streppelhoff; Peter Thiede; Ulrich Viefers; Marc Weber | (United States) 1996 Atlanta | Rowing | Men's eight |
| Bronze | Thomas Lange | (United States) 1996 Atlanta | Rowing | Men's single sculls |
| Gold | Kathrin Boron; Jana Thieme | (Australia) 2000 Sydney | Rowing | Women's double sculls |
| Gold | Kerstin El Qalqili-Kowalski; Meike Evers; Manja Kowalski; Manuela Lutze | (Australia) 2000 Sydney | Rowing | Women's quadruple sculls |
| Silver | Claudia Blasberg; Valerie Viehoff | (Australia) 2000 Sydney | Rowing | Women's lightweight double sculls |
| Bronze | Marcel Hacker | (Australia) 2000 Sydney | Rowing | Men's single sculls |
| Bronze | Marco Geisler; Andreas Hajek; Stephan Volkert; André Willms | (Australia) 2000 Sydney | Rowing | Men's quadruple sculls |
| Bronze | Katrin Rutschow-Stomporowski | (Australia) 2000 Sydney | Rowing | Women's single sculls |
| Gold | Katrin Rutschow-Stomporowski | (Greece) 2004 Athens | Rowing | Women's single sculls |
| Gold | Kathrin Boron; Kerstin El Qalqili; Meike Evers; Manuela Lutze | (Greece) 2004 Athens | Rowing | Women's quadruple sculls |
| Silver | Britta Oppelt; Peggy Waleska | (Greece) 2004 Athens | Rowing | Women's double sculls |
| Silver | Claudia Blasberg; Daniela Reimer | (Greece) 2004 Athens | Rowing | Women's lightweight double sculls |
| Silver | Annekatrin Thiele; Christiane Huth | (China) 2008 Beijing | Rowing | Women's double sculls |
| Bronze | Britta Oppelt; Manuela Lutze; Kathrin Boron; Stephanie Schiller | (China) 2008 Beijing | Rowing | Women's quadruple sculls |
| Gold | Karl Schulze; Philipp Wende; Lauritz Schoof; Tim Grohmann | (United Kingdom) 2012 London | Rowing | Men's quadruple sculls |
| Gold | Filip Adamski; Andreas Kuffner; Eric Johannesen; Maximilian Reinelt; Richard Schmidt; Lukas Müller; Florian Mennigen; Kristof Wilke; Martin Sauer | (United Kingdom) 2012 London | Rowing | Men's eight |
| Silver | Annekatrin Thiele; Carina Bär; Julia Richter; Britta Oppelt | (United Kingdom) 2012 London | Rowing | Women's quadruple sculls |
| Gold | Annekatrin Thiele; Carina Bär; Julia Lier; Lisa Schmidla | (Brazil) 2016 Rio de Janeiro | Rowing | Women's quadruple sculls |
| Gold | Philipp Wende; Lauritz Schoof; Karl Schulze; Hans Gruhne | (Brazil) 2016 Rio de Janeiro | Rowing | Men's quadruple sculls |
| Silver | Felix Drahotta; Malte Jakschik; Eric Johannesen; Andreas Kuffner; Maximilian Munski; Hannes Ocik; Maximilian Reinelt; Richard Schmidt; Martin Sauer | (Brazil) 2016 Rio de Janeiro | Rowing | Men's eight |
| Silver | Jason Osborne; Jonathan Rommelmann | (Japan) 2020 Tokyo | Rowing | Men's lightweight double sculls |
| Silver | Laurits Follert; Malte Jakschik; Torben Johannesen; Hannes Ocik; Olaf Roggensack; Martin Sauer; Richard Schmidt; Jakob Schneider; Johannes Weißenfeld | (Japan) 2020 Tokyo | Rowing | Men's eight |
| Gold | Oliver Zeidler | (France) 2024 Paris | Rowing | Men's single sculls |
| Bronze | Maren Völz; Tabea Schendekehl; Leonie Menzel; Pia Greiten | (France) 2024 Paris | Rowing | Women's quadruple sculls |

=== Rugby ===
| Medal | Name | Games | Sport | Event |
|---|---|---|---|---|
| Silver | Hermann Kreuzer; Arnold Landvoigt; Heinrich Reitz; Jacob Herrmann; Erich Ludwig; Hugo Betting; August Schmierer; Fritz Muller; Adolf Stockhausen; Hans Latscha; Willy Hofmeister; Georg Wenderoth; Eduard Poppe; Richard Ludwig; Albert Amrhein | (France) 1900 Paris | Rugby | Men's 15 Rugby |

=== Sailing ===
| Medal | Name | Games | Sport | Event |
|---|---|---|---|---|
| Gold | Paul Wiesner; Georg Naue; Heinrich Peters; Ottokar Weise | (France) 1900 Paris | Sailing | 1 to 2 ton |
| Silver | Paul Wiesner; Georg Naue; Heinrich Peters; Ottokar Weise | (France) 1900 Paris | Sailing | Open Class |
| Gold | Peter Bischoff; Hans-Joachim Weise | (Germany) 1936 Berlin | Sailing | Star |
| Silver | Werner Krogmann | (Germany) 1936 Berlin | Sailing | O-Jolle |
| Bronze | Hans Howaldt; Alfried Krupp von Bohlen und Halbach; Fritz Bischoff; Eduard Mohr; Otto Wachs; Felix Scheder-Bieschin | (Germany) 1936 Berlin | Sailing | 8 metre |
| Bronze | Theodor Thomsen; Erich Natusch; Georg Nowka | (Finland) 1952 Helsinki | Sailing | Dragon |
| Gold | Jochen Schümann; Thomas Flach; Bernd Jäkel | (United States) 1996 Savannah | Sailing | Soling |
| Silver | Amelie Lux | (Australia) 2000 Sydney | Sailing | Women's mistral |
| Silver | Jochen Schümann; Gunnar Bahr; Ingo Borkowski | (Australia) 2000 Sydney | Sailing | Soling |
| Bronze | René Schwall; Roland Gäbler | (Australia) 2000 Sydney | Sailing | Tornado |
| Bronze | Jan-Peter Peckolt; Hannes Peckolt | (China) 2008 Beijing | Sailing | 49er |
| Bronze | Erik Heil; Thomas Plößel | (Brazil) 2016 Rio de Janeiro | Sailing | 49er |
| Silver | Susann Beucke; Tina Lutz | (Japan) 2020 Tokyo | Sailing | 49er FX |
| Bronze | Erik Heil; Thomas Plößel | (Japan) 2020 Tokyo | Sailing | 49er |
| Bronze | Paul Kohlhoff; Alica Stuhlemmer | (Japan) 2020 Tokyo | Sailing | Nacra 17 |

=== Shooting ===
| Medal | Name | Games | Sport | Event |
|---|---|---|---|---|
| Silver | Alfred Goeldel | (Sweden) 1912 Stockholm | Shooting | Men's Trap |
| Bronze | Erich Graf von Bernstorff; Franz von Zedlitz und Leipe; Horst Goeldel; Albert Preuss; Erland Koch; Alfred Goeldel | (Sweden) 1912 Stockholm | Shooting | Men's Trap Team |
| Silver | Heinz Hax | (United States) 1932 Los Angeles | Shooting | Men's Rapid fire Pistol |
| Gold | Cornelius van Oyen | (Germany) 1936 Berlin | Shooting | Men's Rapid fire Pistol |
| Silver | Heinz Hax | (Germany) 1936 Berlin | Shooting | Men's Rapid fire Pistol |
| Silver | Erich Krempel | (Germany) 1936 Berlin | Shooting | Men's 50 meter pistol, individual |
| Gold | Michael Jakosits | (Spain) 1992 Barcelona | Shooting | Men's 10 meter running target |
| Gold | Ralf Schumann | (Spain) 1992 Barcelona | Shooting | Men's Rapid fire Pistol |
| Bronze | Johann Riederer | (Spain) 1992 Barcelona | Shooting | Men's Air Rifle |
| Gold | Ralf Schumann | (United States) 1996 Atlanta | Shooting | Men's Rapid fire Pistol |
| Gold | Christian Klees | (United States) 1996 Atlanta | Shooting | Men's 50 meter rifle prone |
| Silver | Petra Horneber | (United States) 1996 Atlanta | Shooting | Women's Rapid Air Rifle |
| Silver | Susanne Kiermayer | (United States) 1996 Atlanta | Shooting | Women's double trap |
| Gold | Manfred Kurzer | (Greece) 2004 Athens | Shooting | Men's 10 meter running target |
| Gold | Ralf Schumann | (Greece) 2004 Athens | Shooting | Men's Rapid fire Pistol |
| Silver | Christian Lusch | (Greece) 2004 Athens | Shooting | Men's 50 meter rifle prone |
| Silver | Ralf Schumann | (China) 2008 Beijing | Shooting | Men's Rapid fire Pistol |
| Bronze | Christian Reitz | (China) 2008 Beijing | Shooting | Men's Rapid fire Pistol |
| Bronze | Munkhbayar Dorjsuren | (China) 2008 Beijing | Shooting | Women's Pistol |
| Bronze | Christine Brinker | (China) 2008 Beijing | Shooting | Women's Skeet |
| Gold | Barbara Engleder | (Brazil) 2016 Rio de Janeiro | Shooting | Women's Rifle Three Positions |
| Gold | Henri Junghänel | (Brazil) 2016 Rio de Janeiro | Shooting | Men's 50 meter rifle prone |
| Gold | Christian Reitz | (Brazil) 2016 Rio de Janeiro | Shooting | Men's Rapid fire Pistol |
| Silver | Monika Karsch | (Brazil) 2016 Rio de Janeiro | Shooting | Women's Pistol |

=== Swimming ===
==== Men ====
| Medal | Name | Games | Sport | Event |
|---|---|---|---|---|
| Gold | Ernst Hoppenberg | (France) 1900 Paris | Swimming | 200 metres backstroke |
| Gold | Ernst Hoppenberg; Max Hainle; Julius Frey; Max Schöne; Herbert von Petersdorff | (France) 1900 Paris | Swimming | 200 metres team race |
| Gold | Emil Rausch | (United States) 1904 St. Louis | Swimming | 1 mile freestyle |
| Gold | Walter Brack | (United States) 1904 St. Louis | Swimming | 100 yards backstroke |
| Gold | Georg Zacharias | (United States) 1904 St. Louis | Swimming | 440 yards breaststroke |
| Gold | Emil Rausch | (United States) 1904 St. Louis | Swimming | 880 yards freestyle |
| Silver | Walter Brack | (United States) 1904 St. Louis | Swimming | 440 yards breaststroke |
| Silver | Georg Hoffmann | (United States) 1904 St. Louis | Swimming | 100 yards backstroke |
| Bronze | Georg Zacharias | (United States) 1904 St. Louis | Swimming | 100 yards backstroke |
| Bronze | Emil Rausch | (United States) 1904 St. Louis | Swimming | 220 yards freestyle |
| Gold | Arno Bieberstein | (United Kingdom) 1908 London | Swimming | 100 metres backstroke |
| Gold | Walter Bathe | (Sweden) 1912 Stockholm | Swimming | 200 metres breaststroke |
| Gold | Walter Bathe | (Sweden) 1912 Stockholm | Swimming | 400 metres breaststroke |
| Silver | Otto Fahr | (Sweden) 1912 Stockholm | Swimming | 100 metres backstroke |
| Silver | Wilhelm Lützow | (Sweden) 1912 Stockholm | Swimming | 200 metres breaststroke |
| Bronze | Paul Malisch | (Sweden) 1912 Stockholm | Swimming | 200 metres breaststroke |
| Bronze | Paul Kellner | (Sweden) 1912 Stockholm | Swimming | 100 metres backstroke |
| Silver | Erich Rademacher | (Netherlands) 1928 Amsterdam | Swimming | 200 metres breaststroke |
| Silver | Erwin Sietas | (Germany) 1936 Berlin | Swimming | 200 metres breaststroke |
| Bronze | Herbert Klein | (Finland) 1952 Helsinki | Swimming | 200 metres breaststroke |
| Bronze | Jörg Hoffmann | (Spain) 1992 Barcelona | Swimming | 1500 metres freestyle |
| Bronze | Christian Tröger; Dirk Richter; Steffen Zesner; Mark Pinger; Andreas Szigat; Bengt Zikarsky | (Spain) 1992 Barcelona | Swimming | 4 × 100 metres freestyle relay |
| Bronze | Mark Warnecke | (United States) 1996 Atlanta | Swimming | 100 metres breaststroke |
| Bronze | Mark Pinger; Björn Zikarsky; Christian Tröger; Bengt Zikarsky; Alexander Lüderitz | (United States) 1996 Atlanta | Swimming | 4 × 100 metres freestyle relay |
| Bronze | Christian Tröger; Aimo Heilmann; Christian Keller; Steffen Zesner; Konstantin Dubrovin; Oliver Lampe | (United States) 1996 Atlanta | Swimming | 4 × 200 metres freestyle relay |
| Bronze | Stev Theloke | (Australia) 2000 Sydney | Swimming | 100 metres backstroke |
| Bronze | Stev Theloke; Jens Kruppa; Thomas Rupprath; Torsten Spanneberg | (Australia) 2000 Sydney | Swimming | 4 × 100 metres medley relay |
| Silver | Steffen Driesen; Jens Kruppa; Thomas Rupprath; Lars Conrad; Helge Meeuw | (Greece) 2004 Athens | Swimming | 4 × 100 metres medley relay |
| Bronze | Thomas Lurz | (China) 2008 Beijing | Swimming | 10 km marathon |
| Silver | Thomas Lurz | (United Kingdom) 2012 London | Swimming | 10 km marathon |
| Gold | Florian Wellbrock | (Japan) 2020 Tokyo | Swimming | 10 km marathon |
| Bronze | Florian Wellbrock | (Japan) 2020 Tokyo | Swimming | 1500 metres freestyle |
| Gold | Lukas Märtens | (France) 2024 Paris | Swimming | 400 metre freestyle |
| Silver | Oliver Klemet | (France) 2024 Paris | Swimming | 10 km marathon |

==== Women ====
| Medal | Name | Games | Sport | Event |
|---|---|---|---|---|
| Silver | Wally Dressel; Louise Otto; Hermine Stindt; Grete Rosenberg | (Sweden) 1912 Stockholm | Swimming | 4×100 metres freestyle relay |
| Gold | Hilde Schrader | (Netherlands) 1928 Amsterdam | Swimming | 200 metres breaststroke |
| Bronze | Charlotte Mühe | (Netherlands) 1928 Amsterdam | Swimming | 200 metres breaststroke |
| Silver | Martha Genenger | (Germany) 1936 Berlin | Swimming | 200 metres breaststroke |
| Silver | Gisela Arendt; Ruth Halbsguth; Leni Lohmar; Inge Schmitz | (Germany) 1936 Berlin | Swimming | 4 x 100 metres freestyle relay |
| Bronze | Gisela Arendt | (Germany) 1936 Berlin | Swimming | 100 metres freestyle |
| Gold | Dagmar Hase | (Spain) 1992 Barcelona | Swimming | 400 metres freestyle |
| Silver | Franziska van Almsick | (Spain) 1992 Barcelona | Swimming | 200 metres freestyle |
| Silver | Franziska van Almsick; Daniela Brendel; Jana Dörries; Dagmar Hase; Daniela Hunger; Simone Osygus; Bettina Ustrowski | (Spain) 1992 Barcelona | Swimming | 4 x 100 metres medley relay |
| Silver | Dagmar Hase | (Spain) 1992 Barcelona | Swimming | 200 metres backstroke |
| Bronze | Franziska van Almsick | (Spain) 1992 Barcelona | Swimming | 100 metres freestyle |
| Bronze | Kerstin Kielgass | (Spain) 1992 Barcelona | Swimming | 200 metres freestyle |
| Bronze | Franziska van Almsick; Annette Hadding; Daniela Hunger; Kerstin Kielgass; Simone Osygus; Manuela Stellmach | (Spain) 1992 Barcelona | Swimming | 4 x 100 metres freestyle relay |
| Bronze | Jana Henke | (Spain) 1992 Barcelona | Swimming | 800 metres freestyle |
| Bronze | Daniela Hunger | (Spain) 1992 Barcelona | Swimming | 200 metres individual medley |
| Silver | Sandra Völker | (United States) 1996 Atlanta | Swimming | 100 metres freestyle |
| Silver | Franziska van Almsick | (United States) 1996 Atlanta | Swimming | 200 metres freestyle |
| Silver | Dagmar Hase | (United States) 1996 Atlanta | Swimming | 400 metres freestyle |
| Silver | Dagmar Hase | (United States) 1996 Atlanta | Swimming | 800 metres freestyle |
| Silver | Dagmar Hase; Kerstin Kielgass; Franziska van Almsick; Sandra Völker; Meike Freitag (heats); Simone Osygus (heats) | (United States) 1996 Atlanta | Swimming | 4 × 200 m freestyle relay |
| Bronze | Antje Buschschulte; Simone Osygus; Franziska van Almsick; Sandra Völker; Meike Freitag (heats) | (United States) 1996 Atlanta | Swimming | 4 x 100 metres freestyle relay |
| Bronze | Dagmar Hase | (United States) 1996 Atlanta | Swimming | 200 metres Freestyle |
| Bronze | Sandra Völker | (United States) 1996 Atlanta | Swimming | 50 metres freestyle |
| Bronze | Cathleen Rund | (United States) 1996 Atlanta | Swimming | 200 metres backstroke |
| Bronze | Antje Buschschulte; Sara Harstick; Kerstin Kielgass; Franziska van Almsick; Meike Freitag (heats); Britta Steffen (heats) | (Australia) 2000 Sydney | Swimming | 4 × 200 m freestyle relay |
| Bronze | Antje Buschschulte; Petra Dallmann; Janina Götz; Sara Harstick; Hannah Stockbauer; Franziska van Almsick | (Greece) 2004 Athens | Swimming | 4 × 200 m freestyle relay |
| Bronze | Anne Poleska | (Greece) 2004 Athens | Swimming | 200 metres breaststroke |
| Bronze | Antje Buschschulte | (Greece) 2004 Athens | Swimming | 200 metres backstroke |
| Bronze | Antje Buschschulte; Daniela Götz; Sarah Poewe; Franziska van Almsick | (Greece) 2004 Athens | Swimming | 4 x 100 metres medley relay |
| Gold | Britta Steffen | (China) 2008 Beijing | Swimming | 100 metres freestyle |
| Gold | Britta Steffen | (China) 2008 Beijing | Swimming | 50 metres freestyle |
| Bronze | Sarah Köhler | (Japan) 2020 Tokyo | Swimming | 1500 metres freestyle |
| Bronze | Isabel Gose | (France) 2024 Paris | Swimming | 1500 metre freestyle |

=== Table tennis ===
| Medal | Name | Games | Sport | Event |
|---|---|---|---|---|
| Silver | Steffen Fetzner; Jörg Roßkopf | (Spain) 1992 Barcelona | Table tennis | Men's doubles |
| Bronze | Jörg Roßkopf | (United States) 1996 Atlanta | Table tennis | Men's singles |
| Silver | Timo Boll; Dimitrij Ovtcharov; Christian Süß | (China) 2008 Beijing | Table tennis | Men's team |
| Bronze | Dimitrij Ovtcharov | (United Kingdom) 2012 London | Table tennis | Men's singles |
| Bronze | Timo Boll; Dimitrij Ovtcharov; Bastian Steger | (United Kingdom) 2012 London | Table tennis | Men's team |
| Silver | Han Ying; Petrissa Solja; Shan Xiaona | (Brazil) 2016 Rio de Janeiro | Table tennis | Women's team |
| Bronze | Bastian Steger; Dimitrij Ovtcharov; Timo Boll | (Brazil) 2016 Rio de Janeiro | Table tennis | Men's team |
| Silver | Timo Boll; Dimitrij Ovtcharov; Patrick Franziska | (Japan) 2020 Tokyo | Table tennis | Men's team |
| Bronze | Dimitrij Ovtcharov | (Japan) 2020 Tokyo | Table tennis | Men's singles |

=== Taekwondo ===
| Medal | Name | Games | Sport | Event |
|---|---|---|---|---|
| Silver | Faissal Ebnoutalib | (Australia) 2000 Sydney | Taekwondo | Men's middleweight |
| Bronze | Helena Fromm | (United Kingdom) 2012 London | Taekwondo | Women's middleweight |

=== Tennis ===
| Medal | Name | Games | Sport | Event |
|---|---|---|---|---|
| Silver | Otto Froitzheim | (United Kingdom) 1908 London | Tennis | Men's single |
| Gold | Dorothea Köring; Heinrich Schomburgk | (Sweden) 1912 Stockholm | Tennis | Mixed |
| Silver | Dorothea Köring | (Sweden) 1912 Stockholm | Tennis | Women's single |
| Bronze | Oskar Kreuzer | (Sweden) 1912 Stockholm | Tennis | Men's single |
| Gold | Boris Becker; Michael Stich | (Spain) 1992 Barcelona | Tennis | Men's double |
| Silver | Steffi Graf | (Spain) 1992 Barcelona | Tennis | Women's single |
| Bronze | Marc-Kevin Goellner; David Prinosil | (United States) 1996 Atlanta | Tennis | Men's double |
| Silver | Tommy Haas | (Australia) 2000 Sydney | Tennis | Men's single |
| Silver | Nicolas Kiefer; Rainer Schüttler | (Greece) 2004 Athens | Tennis | Men's double |
| Silver | Angelique Kerber | (Brazil) 2016 Rio de Janeiro | Tennis | Women's single |
| Gold | Alexander Zverev | (Japan) 2020 Tokyo | Tennis | Men's single |

=== Triathlon ===
| Medal | Name | Games | Sport | Event |
|---|---|---|---|---|
| Silver | Stephan Vuckovic | (Australia) 2000 Sydney | Triathlon | Men's individual |
| Gold | Jan Frodeno | (China) 2008 Beijing | Triathlon | Men's individual |
| Gold | Tim Hellwig; Lisa Tertsch; Lasse Lührs; Laura Lindemann | (France) 2024 Paris | Triathlon | Mixed relay |

=== Water Polo ===
| Medal | Name | Games | Sport | Event |
|---|---|---|---|---|
| Gold | Max Amann; Karl Bähre; Emil Benecke; Johannes Blank; Otto Cordes; Fritz Gunst; Erich Rademacher; Joachim Rademacher | (Netherlands) 1928 Amsterdam | Water Polo | Men |
| Silver | Emil Benecke; Otto Cordes; Hans Eckstein; Fritz Gunst; Erich Rademacher; Joachim Rademacher; Hans Schulze; Heiko Schwartz | (United States) 1932 Los Angeles | Water Polo | Men |
| Silver | Bernhard Baier; Fritz Gunst; Josef Hauser; Alfred Kienzle; Paul Klingenburg; Heinrich Krug; Hans Schulze; Gustav Schürger; Helmuth Schwenn; Hans Schneider; Fritz Stolze | (Germany) 1936 Berlin | Water Polo | Men |

=== Weightlifting ===
| Medal | Name | Games | Sport | Event |
|---|---|---|---|---|
| Gold | Josef Straßberger | (Netherlands) 1928 Amsterdam | Weightlifting | Heavyweight (82,5 kg+) |
| Gold | Kurt Helbig | (Netherlands) 1928 Amsterdam | Weightlifting | Lightweight (-67,5 kg) |
| Bronze | Hans Wölpert | (Netherlands) 1928 Amsterdam | Weightlifting | Featherweight (-60 kg) |
| Gold | Rudolf Ismayr | (United States) 1932 Los Angeles | Weightlifting | Middleweight (-75 kg) |
| Bronze | Josef Straßberger | (United States) 1932 Los Angeles | Weightlifting | Heavyweight (82,5 kg+) |
| Silver | Hans Wölpert | (United States) 1932 Los Angeles | Weightlifting | Featherweight (-60 kg) |
| Gold | Josef Manger | (Germany) 1936 Berlin | Weightlifting | Heavyweight (82,5 kg+) |
| Silver | Eugen Deutsch | (Germany) 1936 Berlin | Weightlifting | Light heavyweight (-82,5 kg) |
| Silver | Rudolf Ismayr | (Germany) 1936 Berlin | Weightlifting | Middleweight (-75 kg) |
| Bronze | Karl Jansen | (Germany) 1936 Berlin | Weightlifting | Lightweight (-67,5 kg) |
| Bronze | Adolf Wagner | (Germany) 1936 Berlin | Weightlifting | Middleweight (-75 kg) |
| Gold | Ronny Weller | (Spain) 1992 Barcelona | Weightlifting | Heavyweight (-110 kg) |
| Bronze | Andreas Behm | (Spain) 1992 Barcelona | Weightlifting | Lightweight (-67,5 kg) |
| Bronze | Manfred Nerlinger | (Spain) 1992 Barcelona | Weightlifting | Super heavyweight (110 kg+) |
| Silver | Ronny Weller | (United States) 1996 Atlanta | Weightlifting | Super heavyweight (108 kg+) |
| Silver | Marc Huster | (United States) 1996 Atlanta | Weightlifting | Light heavyweight (-83 kg) |
| Bronze | Oliver Caruso | (United States) 1996 Atlanta | Weightlifting | Middle heavyweight (-91 kg) |
| Silver | Marc Huster | (Australia) 2000 Sydney | Weightlifting | Light heavyweight (-85 kg) |
| Silver | Ronny Weller | (Australia) 2000 Sydney | Weightlifting | Super heavyweight (105 kg+) |
| Gold | Matthias Steiner | (China) 2008 Beijing | Weightlifting | Super heavyweight (105 kg+) |

=== Wrestling ===
| Medal | Name | Games | Sport | Event |
|---|---|---|---|---|
| Gold | Carl Schuhmann | (Greece) 1896 Athens | Wrestling | Men's Greco-Roman open class |
| Silver | Georg Gerstäcker | (Sweden) 1912 Stockholm | Wrestling | Men's Greco-Roman featherweight (-60 kg) |
| Gold | Kurt Leucht | (Netherlands) 1928 Amsterdam | Wrestling | Men's Greco-Roman bantamweight (-58 kg) |
| Silver | Adolf Rieger | (Netherlands) 1928 Amsterdam | Wrestling | Men's Greco-Roman light heavyweight (-82,5 kg) |
| Silver | Eduard Sperling | (Netherlands) 1928 Amsterdam | Wrestling | Men's Greco-Roman lightweight (-67,5 kg) |
| Bronze | Georg Gehring | (Netherlands) 1928 Amsterdam | Wrestling | Men's Greco-Roman heavyweight (82,5 kg+) |
| Gold | Jakob Brendel | (United States) 1932 Los Angeles | Wrestling | Men's Greco-Roman bantamweight (-56 kg) |
| Silver | Wolfgang Ehrl | (United States) 1932 Los Angeles | Wrestling | Men's Greco-Roman featherweight (-61 kg) |
| Silver | Jean Földeák | (United States) 1932 Los Angeles | Wrestling | Men's Greco-Roman middleweight (-79 kg) |
| Bronze | Eduard Sperling | (United States) 1932 Los Angeles | Wrestling | Men's Greco-Roman lightweight (-66 kg) |
| Silver | Fritz Schäfer | (Germany) 1936 Berlin | Wrestling | Men's Greco-Roman welterweight (-72 kg) |
| Silver | Ludwig Schweickert | (Germany) 1936 Berlin | Wrestling | Men's Greco-Roman middleweight (-79 kg) |
| Silver | Wolfgang Ehrl | (Germany) 1936 Berlin | Wrestling | Men's freestyle lightweight (-67,5 kg) |
| Bronze | Johannes Herbert | (Germany) 1936 Berlin | Wrestling | Men's freestyle bantamweight (-56 kg) |
| Bronze | Jakob Brendel | (Germany) 1936 Berlin | Wrestling | Men's Greco-Roman bantamweight (-56 kg) |
| Bronze | Kurt Hornfischer | (Germany) 1936 Berlin | Wrestling | Men's Greco-Roman heavyweight (87 kg+) |
| Bronze | Erich Siebert | (Germany) 1936 Berlin | Wrestling | Men's freestyle light heavyweight (-87 kg) |
| Gold | Maik Bullmann | (Spain) 1992 Barcelona | Wrestling | Men's Greco-Roman light heavyweight (-90 kg) |
| Silver | Rıfat Yıldız | (Spain) 1992 Barcelona | Wrestling | Men's Greco-Roman bantamweight (-57 kg) |
| Silver | Heiko Balz | (Spain) 1992 Barcelona | Wrestling | Men's freestyle heavyweight (-100 kg) |
| Silver | Thomas Zander | (United States) 1996 Atlanta | Wrestling | Men's Greco-Roman middleweight (-82 kg) |
| Bronze | Arawat Sabejew | (United States) 1996 Atlanta | Wrestling | Men's freestyle heavyweight (-100 kg) |
| Bronze | Maik Bullmann | (United States) 1996 Atlanta | Wrestling | Men's Greco-Roman light heavyweight (-90 kg) |
| Silver | Mirko Englich | (China) 2008 Beijing | Wrestling | Men's Greco-Roman heavyweight (-96 kg) |
| Bronze | Denis Kudla | (Brazil) 2016 Rio de Janeiro | Wrestling | Men's Greco-Roman middleweight(-85 kg) |
| Gold | Aline Rotter-Focken | (Japan) 2020 Tokyo | Wrestling | Women's freestyle heavyweight (-76 kg) |
| Bronze | Denis Kudla | (Japan) 2020 Tokyo | Wrestling | Men's Greco-Roman middleweight (-85 kg) |
| Bronze | Frank Stäbler | (Japan) 2020 Tokyo | Wrestling | Men's Greco-Roman lightweight (-67 kg) |

== Summary by sport ==
=== Aquatics ===
==== Artistic swimming ====
| Games | Swimmers | Events | Gold | Silver | Bronze | Total |
|---|---|---|---|---|---|---|
| 1992 Barcelona | 2 | 2/2 | 0 | 0 | 0 | 0 |
| Total | 2 | 2/17 | 0 | 0 | 0 | 0 |

==== Diving ====
| Games | Athletes | Events | Gold | Silver | Bronze | Total |
|---|---|---|---|---|---|---|
| 1904 St. Louis | 3 | 1/2 | 0 | 1 | 0 | 1 |
| 1908 London | 5 | 2/2 | 1 | 1 | 1 | 3 |
| 1912 Stockholm | 4 | 3/4 | 1 | 2 | 1 | 4 |
| 1928 Amsterdam | 9 | 4/4 | 0 | 0 | 0 | 0 |
| 1932 Los Angeles | 2 | 2/4 | 0 | 0 | 0 | 0 |
| 1936 Berlin | 11 | 4/4 | 0 | 0 | 2 | 2 |
| 1952 Helsinki | 4 | 2/4 | 0 | 0 | 1 | 1 |
| 1992 Barcelona | 7 | 4/4 | 0 | 0 | 1 | 1 |
| 1996 Atlanta | 7 | 4/4 | 0 | 2 | 0 | 2 |
| 2000 Sydney | 8 | 6/8 | 0 | 0 | 2 | 2 |
| 2004 Athens | 10 | 7/8 | 0 | 1 | 0 | 1 |
| 2008 Beijing | 9 | 8/8 | 0 | 1 | 1 | 2 |
| 2012 London | 8 | 6/8 | 0 | 0 | 0 | 0 |
| 2016 Rio de Janeiro | 8 | 7/8 | 0 | 0 | 1 | 1 |
| 2020 Tokyo | 9 | 7/8 | 0 | 0 | 2 | 2 |
| 2024 Paris | 9 | 6/8 | 0 | 0 | 0 | 0 |
| Total | | 73/102 | 2 | 8 | 12 | 22 |

==== Swimming ====
Germany first competed in swimming at 1900 Games, with six swimmers in five events, winning two gold medals.

| Games | Swimmers | Events | Gold | Silver | Bronze | Total |
|---|---|---|---|---|---|---|
| 1900 Paris | 6 | 5/7 | 2 | 0 | 0 | 2 |
| 1904 St. Louis | 4 | 5/9 | 4 | 2 | 2 | 8 |
| 1908 London | 5 | 2/6 | 1 | 0 | 0 | 1 |
| 1912 Stockholm | 17 | 8/9 | 2 | 3 | 2 | 7 |
| 1928 Amsterdam | 19 | 10/11 | 1 | 1 | 1 | 3 |
| 1932 Los Angeles | 2 | 2/11 | 0 | 0 | 0 | 0 |
| 1936 Berlin | 24 | 10/11 | 0 | 3 | 1 | 4 |
| 1952 Helsinki | 9 | 7/11 | 0 | 0 | 1 | 1 |
| 1992 Barcelona | 34 | 31/31 | 1 | 3 | 7 | 11 |
| 1996 Atlanta | 28 | 30/32 | 0 | 5 | 7 | 12 |
| 2000 Sydney | 35 | 32/32 | 0 | 0 | 3 | 3 |
| 2004 Athens | 35 | 29/32 | 0 | 1 | 4 | 5 |
| 2008 Beijing | 25 | 28/34 | 2 | 0 | 1 | 3 |
| 2012 London | 30 | 24/34 | 0 | 1 | 0 | 1 |
| 2016 Rio de Janeiro | 29 | 26/34 | 0 | 0 | 0 | 0 |
| 2020 Tokyo | 31 | 29/37 | 1 | 0 | 2 | 3 |
| 2024 Paris | 25 | 25/37 | 1 | 1 | 1 | 3 |
| Total | | | 15 | 20 | 32 | 67 |

==== Water polo ====
| Games | Swimmers | Events | Gold | Silver | Bronze | Total |
|---|---|---|---|---|---|---|
| 1900 Paris | 7 | 1/1 | 0 | 0 | 0 | 0 |
| 1928 Amsterdam | 8 | 1/1 | 1 | 0 | 0 | 1 |
| 1932 Los Angeles | 8 | 1/1 | 0 | 1 | 0 | 1 |
| 1936 Berlin | 11 | 1/1 | 0 | 1 | 0 | 1 |
| 1952 Helsinki | 9 | 1/1 | 0 | 0 | 0 | 0 |
| 1992 Barcelona | 12 | 1/1 | 0 | 0 | 0 | 0 |
| 1996 Atlanta | 13 | 1/1 | 0 | 0 | 0 | 0 |
| 2004 Athens | 13 | 1/2 | 0 | 0 | 0 | 0 |
| 2008 Beijing | 12 | 1/2 | 0 | 0 | 0 | 0 |
| Total | | 9/27 | 1 | 2 | 0 | 3 |

=== Archery ===
| Games | Archers | Events | Gold | Silver | Bronze | Total |
|---|---|---|---|---|---|---|
| 1992 Barcelona | 6 | 4/4 | 0 | 0 | 0 | 0 |
| 1996 Atlanta | 3 | 2/4 | 0 | 1 | 0 | 1 |
| 2000 Sydney | 4 | 3/4 | 0 | 0 | 1 | 1 |
| 2004 Athens | 4 | 3/4 | 0 | 0 | 0 | 0 |
| 2008 Beijing | 2 | 2/4 | 0 | 0 | 0 | 0 |
| 2012 London | 2 | 2/4 | 0 | 0 | 0 | 0 |
| 2016 Rio de Janeiro | 2 | 2/4 | 0 | 1 | 0 | 1 |
| 2020 Tokyo | 4 | 4/5 | 0 | 0 | 1 | 1 |
| 2024 Paris | 4 | 4/5 | 0 | 1 | 0 | 1 |
| Total | 20 | 26/54 | 0 | 3 | 2 | 5 |

=== Athletics ===
| Games | Athletes | Events | Gold | Silver | Bronze | Total |
|---|---|---|---|---|---|---|
| 1896 Athens | 5 | 9/12 | 0 | 1 | 0 | 1 |
| 1900 Paris | 6 | 9/23 | 0 | 0 | 0 | 0 |
| 1904 St. Louis | 2 | 5/25 | 0 | 0 | 1 | 1 |
| 1908 London | 20 | 16/26 | 0 | 1 | 1 | 2 |
| 1912 Stockholm | 24 | 21/30 | 0 | 2 | 0 | 2 |
| 1928 Amsterdam | 60 | 22/27 | 1 | 2 | 6 | 9 |
| 1932 Los Angeles | 27 | 23/29 | 0 | 2 | 3 | 5 |
| 1936 Berlin | 77 | 29/29 | 5 | 4 | 7 | 16 |
| 1952 Helsinki | 39 | 24/33 | 0 | 3 | 5 | 8 |
| 1992 Barcelona | 79 | 38/43 | 4 | 1 | 5 | 10 |
| 1996 Atlanta | 85 | 40/44 | 3 | 1 | 3 | 7 |
| 2000 Sydney | 64 | 35/46 | 2 | 1 | 2 | 5 |
| 2004 Athens | 71 | 36/46 | 0 | 2 | 0 | 2 |
| 2008 Beijing | 53 | 32/47 | 0 | 1 | 0 | 1 |
| 2012 London | 71 | 33/47 | 1 | 5 | 2 | 8 |
| 2016 Rio de Janeiro | 84 | 37/47 | 2 | 0 | 1 | 3 |
| 2020 Tokyo | 80 | 42/48 | 1 | 2 | 0 | 3 |
| 2024 Paris | 79 | 38/48 | 1 | 2 | 1 | 4 |
| Total | | 489/650 | 20 | 30 | 37 | 87 |

=== Badminton ===
| Games | Athletes | Events | Gold | Silver | Bronze | Total |
|---|---|---|---|---|---|---|
| 1992 Barcelona | 4 | 4/4 | 0 | 0 | 0 | 0 |
| 1996 Atlanta | 6 | 4/5 | 0 | 0 | 0 | 0 |
| 2000 Sydney | 6 | 4/5 | 0 | 0 | 0 | 0 |
| 2004 Athens | 6 | 4/5 | 0 | 0 | 0 | 0 |
| 2008 Beijing | 5 | 3/5 | 0 | 0 | 0 | 0 |
| 2012 London | 6 | 4/5 | 0 | 0 | 0 | 0 |
| 2016 Rio de Janeiro | 7 | 5/5 | 0 | 0 | 0 | 0 |
| 2020 Tokyo | 5 | 4/5 | 0 | 0 | 0 | 0 |
| 2024 Paris | 4 | 3/5 | 0 | 0 | 0 | 0 |
| Total | 29 | 35/44 | 0 | 0 | 0 | 0 |

=== Basketball ===
| Games | Athletes | Events | Gold | Silver | Bronze | Total |
|---|---|---|---|---|---|---|
| 1936 Berlin | 10 | 1/1 | 0 | 0 | 0 | 0 |
| 1992 Barcelona | 12 | 1/2 | 0 | 0 | 0 | 0 |
| 2008 Beijing | 12 | 1/2 | 0 | 0 | 0 | 0 |
| 2020 Tokyo | 12 | 1/4 | 0 | 0 | 0 | 0 |
| 2024 Paris | 28 | 3/4 | 1 | 0 | 0 | 1 |
| Total | 67 | 7/24 | 1 | 0 | 0 | 1 |

=== Beach volleyball ===
| Games | Athletes | Events | Gold | Silver | Bronze | Total |
|---|---|---|---|---|---|---|
| 1996 Atlanta | 4 | 2/2 | 0 | 0 | 0 | 0 |
| 2000 Sydney | 8 | 2/2 | 0 | 0 | 1 | 1 |
| 2004 Athens | 8 | 2/2 | 0 | 0 | 0 | 0 |
| 2008 Beijing | 8 | 2/2 | 0 | 0 | 0 | 0 |
| 2012 London | 8 | 2/2 | 1 | 0 | 0 | 1 |
| 2016 Rio de Janeiro | 6 | 2/2 | 1 | 0 | 0 | 1 |
| 2020 Tokyo | 6 | 2/2 | 0 | 0 | 0 | 0 |
| 2024 Paris | 6 | 2/2 | 0 | 1 | 0 | 1 |
| Total | 37 | 16/16 | 2 | 1 | 1 | 4 |

=== Boxing ===
| Games | Athletes | Events | Gold | Silver | Bronze | Total |
|---|---|---|---|---|---|---|
| 1928 Amsterdam | 8 | 8/8 | 0 | 1 | 0 | 1 |
| 1932 Los Angeles | 8 | 8/8 | 0 | 3 | 0 | 3 |
| 1936 Berlin | 8 | 8/8 | 2 | 2 | 1 | 5 |
| 1952 Helsinki | 10 | 10/10 | 0 | 1 | 1 | 2 |
| 1992 Barcelona | 12 | 12/12 | 2 | 1 | 1 | 4 |
| 1996 Atlanta | 8 | 8/12 | 0 | 1 | 3 | 4 |
| 2000 Sydney | 8 | 8/12 | 0 | 0 | 1 | 1 |
| 2004 Athens | 4 | 4/11 | 0 | 0 | 2 | 2 |
| 2008 Beijing | 4 | 4/11 | 0 | 0 | 0 | 0 |
| 2012 London | 4 | 4/13 | 0 | 0 | 0 | 0 |
| 2016 Rio de Janeiro | 6 | 6/13 | 0 | 0 | 1 | 1 |
| 2020 Tokyo | 3 | 3/13 | 0 | 0 | 0 | 0 |
| 2024 Paris | 2 | 2/13 | 0 | 0 | 1 | 1 |
| Total | 78 | 85/156 | 4 | 9 | 11 | 24 |

=== Canoeing ===
| Games | Athletes | Events | Gold | Silver | Bronze | Total |
|---|---|---|---|---|---|---|
| 1936 Berlin | 14 | 9/9 | 2 | 3 | 2 | 7 |
| 1952 Helsinki | 10 | 9/9 | 0 | 0 | 3 | 3 |
| 1992 Barcelona | 29 | 15/16 | 7 | 2 | 2 | 11 |
| 1996 Atlanta | 27 | 16/16 | 5 | 2 | 2 | 9 |
| 2000 Sydney | 25 | 16/16 | 4 | 1 | 3 | 8 |
| 2004 Athens | 26 | 16/16 | 4 | 4 | 1 | 9 |
| 2008 Beijing | 22 | 16/16 | 3 | 2 | 3 | 8 |
| 2012 London | 21 | 16/16 | 3 | 2 | 3 | 8 |
| 2016 Rio de Janeiro | 18 | 16/16 | 4 | 2 | 1 | 7 |
| 2020 Tokyo | 21 | 14/16 | 2 | 1 | 4 | 7 |
| 2024 Paris | 23 | 16/16 | 2 | 2 | 2 | 6 |
| Total | | 159/162 | 36 | 21 | 26 | 83 |

=== Cycling ===
Germany competed in all six of the cycling events at the first Games in 1896, earning a silver medal.

| Games | Cyclists | Events | Gold | Silver | Bronze | Total |
|---|---|---|---|---|---|---|
| 1896 Athens | 5 | 6/6 | 0 | 1 | 0 | 1 |
| 1900 Paris | 3 | 3/3 | 0 | 1 | 0 | 1 |
| 1908 London | 10 | 7/7 | 0 | 1 | 1 | 2 |
| 1912 Stockholm | 11 | 2/2 | 0 | 0 | 0 | 0 |
| 1928 Amsterdam | 10 | 6/6 | 0 | 0 | 1 | 1 |
| 1932 Los Angeles | 4 | 2/6 | 0 | 0 | 0 | 0 |
| 1936 Berlin | 12 | 6/6 | 2 | 0 | 1 | 3 |
| 1952 Helsinki | 5 | 3/6 | 0 | 0 | 2 | 2 |
| 1992 Barcelona | 17 | 10/10 | 4 | 2 | 0 | 6 |
| 1996 Atlanta | 18 | 13/14 | 1 | 0 | 1 | 2 |
| 2000 Sydney | 25 | 18/18 | 3 | 4 | 3 | 10 |
| 2004 Athens | 19 | 17/18 | 1 | 1 | 4 | 6 |
| 2008 Beijing | 20 | 13/18 | 1 | 1 | 1 | 3 |
| 2012 London | 22 | 15/18 | 1 | 4 | 1 | 6 |
| 2016 Rio de Janeiro | 30 | 18/18 | 1 | 0 | 1 | 2 |
| 2020 Tokyo | 25 | 18/22 | 1 | 1 | 0 | 2 |
| 2024 Paris | 25 | 21/22 | 0 | 1 | 1 | 2 |
| Total | | 213/243 | 15 | 17 | 17 | 49 |

=== Equestrian ===
Germany competed in equestrian at the first Games in which the sport was held, in Paris 1900. One rider competed in the mail coach event, winning no medals.

| Games | Riders | Events | Gold | Silver | Bronze | Total |
|---|---|---|---|---|---|---|
| 1900 Paris | 1 | 1/5 | 0 | 0 | 0 | 0 |
| 1912 Stockholm | 13 | 5/5 | 0 | 3 | 1 | 4 |
| 1928 Amsterdam | 8 | 6/6 | 2 | 0 | 1 | 3 |
| 1936 Berlin | 9 | 6/6 | 6 | 1 | 0 | 7 |
| 1952 Helsinki | 8 | 6/6 | 0 | 1 | 3 | 4 |
| 1992 Barcelona | 9 | 6/6 | 3 | 2 | 2 | 7 |
| 1996 Atlanta | 16 | 6/6 | 4 | 0 | 0 | 4 |
| 2000 Sydney | 14 | 6/6 | 2 | 1 | 1 | 4 |
| 2004 Athens | 13 | 6/6 | 1 | 1 | 2 | 4 |
| 2008 Beijing | 12 | 6/6 | 3 | 1 | 1 | 5 |
| 2012 London | 13 | 6/6 | 2 | 1 | 1 | 4 |
| 2016 Rio de Janeiro | 12 | 6/6 | 2 | 2 | 2 | 6 |
| 2020 Tokyo | 9 | 6/6 | 3 | 1 | 0 | 4 |
| 2024 Paris | 9 | 6/6 | 4 | 1 | 0 | 5 |
| Total | | | 32 | 15 | 14 | 61 |

=== Fencing ===
Germany first competed in fencing in 1900, with a single sabreur who did not advance past the first round.

| Games | Athletes | Events | Gold | Silver | Bronze | Total |
|---|---|---|---|---|---|---|
| 1900 Paris | 1 | 1/7 | 0 | 0 | 0 | 0 |
| 1904 St. Louis | 1 | 2/5 | 0 | 0 | 0 | 0 |
| 1908 London | 10 | 4/4 | 0 | 0 | 0 | 0 |
| 1912 Stockholm | 16 | 5/5 | 0 | 0 | 0 | 0 |
| 1928 Amsterdam | 13 | 7/7 | 1 | 1 | 1 | 3 |
| 1932 Los Angeles | 2 | 3/7 | 0 | 0 | 0 | 0 |
| 1936 Berlin | 16 | 7/7 | 0 | 1 | 2 | 3 |
| 1952 Helsinki | 9 | 6/7 | 0 | 0 | 0 | 0 |
| 1992 Barcelona | 20 | 8/8 | 2 | 1 | 0 | 3 |
| 1996 Atlanta | 15 | 10/10 | 0 | 0 | 1 | 1 |
| 2000 Sydney | 16 | 10/10 | 0 | 2 | 3 | 5 |
| 2004 Athens | 12 | 8/10 | 0 | 1 | 1 | 2 |
| 2008 Beijing | 9 | 6/10 | 2 | 0 | 0 | 2 |
| 2012 London | 14 | 9/10 | 0 | 1 | 1 | 2 |
| 2016 Rio de Janeiro | 4 | 3/10 | 0 | 0 | 0 | 0 |
| 2020 Tokyo | 9 | 5/12 | 0 | 0 | 0 | 0 |
| 2024 Paris | 2 | 2/12 | 0 | 0 | 0 | 0 |
| Total | | 96/144 | 5 | 7 | 9 | 21 |

=== Football ===
| Games | Athletes | Events | Gold | Silver | Bronze | Total |
|---|---|---|---|---|---|---|
| 1912 Stockholm | 22 | 1/1 | 0 | 0 | 0 | 0 |
| 1928 Amsterdam | 11 | 1/1 | 0 | 0 | 0 | 0 |
| 1936 Berlin | 16 | 1/1 | 0 | 0 | 0 | 0 |
| 1952 Helsinki | 14 | 1/1 | 0 | 0 | 0 | 0 |
| 1996 Atlanta | 15 | 1/2 | 0 | 0 | 0 | 0 |
| 2000 Sydney | 17 | 1/2 | 0 | 0 | 1 | 1 |
| 2004 Athens | 17 | 1/2 | 0 | 0 | 1 | 1 |
| 2008 Beijing | 16 | 1/2 | 0 | 0 | 1 | 1 |
| 2016 Rio de Janeiro | 35 | 2/2 | 1 | 1 | 0 | 2 |
| 2020 Tokyo | 16 | 1/2 | 0 | 0 | 0 | 0 |
| 2024 Paris | 18 | 1/2 | 0 | 0 | 1 | 1 |
| Total | | 12/24 | 1 | 1 | 4 | 6 |

=== Golf ===
| Games | Athletes | Events | Gold | Silver | Bronze | Total |
|---|---|---|---|---|---|---|
| 2016 Rio de Janeiro | 4 | 2/2 | 0 | 0 | 0 | 0 |
| 2020 Tokyo | 4 | 2/2 | 0 | 0 | 0 | 0 |
| 2024 Paris | 4 | 2/2 | 0 | 1 | 0 | 1 |
| Total | 11 | 6/10 | 0 | 1 | 0 | 1 |

=== Gymnastics ===
==== Artistic Gymnastics ====
Germany competed in all eight of the gymnastics events at the first Games in 1896, winning five of them and medaling in all eight.

| Games | Gymnasts | Events | Gold | Silver | Bronze | Total |
|---|---|---|---|---|---|---|
| 1896 Athens | 11 | 8/8 | 5 | 3 | 2 | 10 |
| 1900 Paris | 14 | 1/1 | 0 | 0 | 0 | 0 |
| 1904 St. Louis | 7 | 3/11 | 0 | 1 | 1 | 2 |
| 1908 London | 11 | 1/2 | 0 | 0 | 0 | 0 |
| 1912 Stockholm | 18 | 2/4 | 0 | 0 | 0 | 0 |
| 1936 Berlin | 16 | 9/9 | 6 | 1 | 6 | 13 |
| 1952 Helsinki | 16 | 15/15 | 0 | 1 | 0 | 1 |
| 1992 Barcelona | 12 | 14/14 | 0 | 1 | 2 | 3 |
| 1996 Atlanta | 9 | 13/14 | 1 | 0 | 0 | 1 |
| 2000 Sydney | 6 | 8/14 | 0 | 0 | 0 | 0 |
| 2004 Athens | 8 | 13/14 | 0 | 0 | 0 | 0 |
| 2008 Beijing | 12 | 14/14 | 0 | 1 | 1 | 2 |
| 2012 London | 10 | 14/14 | 0 | 3 | 0 | 3 |
| 2016 Rio de Janeiro | 10 | 14/14 | 1 | 0 | 1 | 2 |
| 2020 Tokyo | 8 | 14/14 | 0 | 1 | 0 | 1 |
| 2024 Paris | 8 | 13/14 | 0 | 0 | 0 | 0 |
| Total | 159 | 156/195 | 13 | 12 | 13 | 38 |

==== Rhythmic Gymnastics ====
| Games | Gymnasts | Events | Gold | Silver | Bronze | Total |
|---|---|---|---|---|---|---|
| 1992 Barcelona | 1 | 1/1 | 0 | 0 | 0 | 0 |
| 1996 Atlanta | 8 | 2/2 | 0 | 0 | 0 | 0 |
| 2000 Sydney | 8 | 2/2 | 0 | 0 | 0 | 0 |
| 2004 Athens | 1 | 1/2 | 0 | 0 | 0 | 0 |
| 2012 London | 7 | 2/2 | 0 | 0 | 0 | 0 |
| 2016 Rio de Janeiro | 6 | 2/2 | 0 | 0 | 0 | 0 |
| 2024 Paris | 7 | 2/2 | 1 | 0 | 0 | 1 |
| Total | 37 | 12/17 | 1 | 0 | 0 | 1 |

==== Trampoline ====
| Games | Gymnasts | Events | Gold | Silver | Bronze | Total |
|---|---|---|---|---|---|---|
| 2000 Sydney | 2 | 2/2 | 0 | 0 | 0 | 0 |
| 2004 Athens | 2 | 2/2 | 1 | 0 | 1 | 2 |
| 2008 Beijing | 2 | 2/2 | 0 | 0 | 0 | 0 |
| 2012 London | 2 | 2/2 | 0 | 0 | 0 | 0 |
| 2016 Rio de Janeiro | 1 | 1/2 | 0 | 0 | 0 | 0 |
| 2024 Paris | 1 | 1/2 | 0 | 0 | 0 | 0 |
| Total | 5 | 10/14 | 1 | 0 | 1 | 2 |

=== Handball ===
| Games | Rowers | Events | Gold | Silver | Bronze | Total |
|---|---|---|---|---|---|---|
| 1936 Berlin | 22 | 1/1 | 1 | 0 | 0 | 1 |
| 1992 Barcelona | 32 | 2/2 | 0 | 0 | 0 | 0 |
| 1996 Atlanta | 30 | 2/2 | 0 | 0 | 0 | 0 |
| 2000 Sydney | 15 | 1/2 | 0 | 0 | 0 | 0 |
| 2004 Athens | 15 | 1/2 | 0 | 1 | 0 | 1 |
| 2008 Beijing | 29 | 2/2 | 0 | 0 | 0 | 0 |
| 2016 Rio de Janeiro | 15 | 1/2 | 0 | 0 | 1 | 1 |
| 2020 Tokyo | 14 | 1/2 | 0 | 0 | 0 | 0 |
| 2024 Paris | 28 | 2/2 | 0 | 1 | 0 | 1 |
| Total | 157 | 13/19 | 1 | 2 | 1 | 4 |

=== Rowing ===
Germany was among the nations that competed at the first Olympic rowing regatta in 1900, with three boats in the men's coxed four (all of which earned medals in an unusual event that awarded two full sets of medals) and one in the men's eight.

| Games | Rowers | Events | Gold | Silver | Bronze | Total |
|---|---|---|---|---|---|---|
| 1900 Paris | 21 | 2/4 | 1 | 0 | 2 | 3 |
| Total | | | 23 | 14 | 14 | 51 |

=== Rugby ===
Germany competed in the inaugural Olympic rugby union contest in 1900, taking joint silver with Great Britain behind winners France. Germany did not compete in any of the other rugby union competitions (in 1908, 1920, or 1924) and was not among the nations competing in the rugby sevens in 2016.

| Games | Players | Events | Gold | Silver | Bronze | Total |
|---|---|---|---|---|---|---|
| 1900 Paris | 15 | 1/1 | 0 | 1 | 0 | 1 |
| Total | | | 0 | 1 | 0 | 1 |

=== Sailing ===
Germany competed in the first Olympic sailing competitions in 1900, taking a gold and a silver medal.

| Games | Rowers | Events | Gold | Silver | Bronze | Total |
|---|---|---|---|---|---|---|
| 1900 Paris | 4 | 3/13 | 1 | 1 | 0 | 2 |
| Total | | | 3 | 4 | 4 | 11 |

=== Tennis ===
Germany first competed in tennis at the inaugural 1896 Games, with one player competing in men's singles and, as part of a mixed team, in men's doubles. Friedrich Traun lost to John Boland in the first round of the singles, but paired with him to win the gold in the doubles. The mixed team medal is not credit to Germany.

| Games | Athletes | Events | Gold | Silver | Bronze | Total |
|---|---|---|---|---|---|---|
| 1896 Athens | 1 | 2/2 | 0 | 0 | 0 | 0 |
| Total | | | 2 | 6 | 2 | 10 |

=== Weightlifting ===
Germany first competed in weightlifting at the inaugural 1896 Games, with one lifter competing in one event.

| Games | Lifters | Events | Gold | Silver | Bronze | Total |
|---|---|---|---|---|---|---|
| 1896 Athens | 1 | 1/2 | 0 | 0 | 0 | 0 |
| Total | | | 6 | 7 | 7 | 20 |

=== Wrestling ===
Germany first competed in wrestling at the inaugural 1896 Games, with one wrestler (actually a gymnast, Carl Schuhmann) competing in the open weight class event. He won the gold medal.

| Games | Wrestlers | Events | Gold | Silver | Bronze | Total |
|---|---|---|---|---|---|---|
| 1896 Athens | 1 | 1/1 | 1 | 0 | 0 | 1 |
| Total | | | 4 | 12 | 9 | 25 |
