= Theodor Thomsen =

German sailor

Medal record

Sailing

Representing Germany

Olympic Games
Bronze medal – third place	1952 Helsinki	Dragon class

Theodor Thomsen (20 March 1904 – 14 May 1982) was a German sailor. He competed for Germany at the 1952 Summer Olympics and won a bronze medal in the Dragon Class with Erich Natusch and Georg Nowka. He also competed for Germany at the 1936 Summer Olympics and for the United Team of Germany at the 1956 Summer Olympics.
