= Erich Natusch =

German sailor

Medal record

Sailing

Representing Germany

Olympic Games
Bronze medal – third place	1952 Helsinki	Dragon class

Erich Natusch (23 February 1912 – 11 March 1999) was a German sailor. He competed for Germany at the 1952 Summer Olympics and won a bronze medal in the Dragon Class with Theodor Thomsen and Georg Nowka. He also competed for the United Team of Germany at the 1956 Summer Olympics.
