= Deaths in December 1989 =

The following is a list of notable deaths in December 1989.

Entries for each day are listed alphabetically by surname. A typical entry lists information in the following sequence:

- Name, age, country of citizenship at birth, subsequent country of citizenship (if applicable), reason for notability, cause of death (if known), and reference.

== December 1989 ==
=== 1 ===
- Alvin Ailey, 58, American dancer, director and choreographer, founder of Alvin Ailey American Dance Theater, AIDS.
- Leo Amino, 78, Japanese-born American sculptor.
- Michał Antoniewicz, 92, Polish equestrian, dual Olympic medalist (1928).
- Danilo Atienza, 38, Filipino air force pilot, plane crash.
- André Charles Biéler, 93, Swiss-born Canadian painter.
- Billy Lyall, 36, Scottish singer, keyboard player and flautist (The Alan Parsons Project, Bay City Rollers), AIDS.
- Nikolai Patolichev, 81, Soviet politician, Ministry of Foreign Trade.
- Earl Reoch, 47, Scottish cricketer.
- Bill Stout, 62, American journalist (CBS News), cardiac arrest.
- Mitchell Ucovich, 74, American NFL footballer (Washington Redskins).
- William Vandivert, 77, American photographer, co-founder of Magnum Photos.

=== 2 ===
- Harland Bartholomew, 100, American civil engineer and urban planner.
- Norman Davis, 76, New Zealand professor of English language and literature (Oxford).
- Keith Ewert, 71, Australian accountant and politician, member of the Australian House of Representatives.
- Oldřich Hanč, 74, Czech Olympic speed skater (1936).
- Delmas Carl Hill, 83, American district and circuit judge.
- Ruth Mary Reynolds, 73, American political and civil rights activist.
- Richard Shannon, 69, American film and television actor (The Tin Star).
- William Taylour, 85, British archaeologist (Mycenaean Greece).

=== 3 ===
- Sourou-Migan Apithy, 76, Beninese politician, president of Dahomey.
- Mario Astorri, 69, Italian footballer and coach (Napoli).
- Connie B. Gay, 75, American country musician, cancer.
- Fernando Martín, 27, Spanish basketball player and swimmer, five-time Spanish swimming champion, traffic collision.
- Syed Safdar Hussain Najafi, 57, Pakistani religious leader.
- Jean-Paul Moulinot, 77, French actor.
- Alexander Obukhov, 71, Soviet geophysicist and applied mathematician (atmospheric physics).
- Paul Wei Ping-ao, 60, Chinese and Hong Kong actor (Fist of Fury, The Way of the Dragon).
- Carlo Rim, 86, French film screenwriter, producer and director.
- Nihal Silva, 35, Sri Lankan comedian and actor, shot.

=== 4 ===
- Gerald Carson, 90, American advertising executive, social historian and writer.
- Émile Janssens, 87, Belgian colonial official and military general.
- Elwyn Jones, 80, Welsh barrister and politician, Lord Chancellor.
- Steve Lembo, 63, American Major League baseball player (Brooklyn Dodgers).
- Colin MacKay, 81, Australian rules footballer.
- Kathleen Manners, 95, English aristocrat.
- Angelo Ruggiero, 49, American mobster, member of the Gambino crime family, cancer.
- May Swenson, 76, American poet and playwright, chancellor of the Academy of American Poets.

=== 5 ===
- Juan Manuel Acuña, 68, Chilean international footballer (Chile national football team).
- Edoardo Amaldi, 81, Italian physicist, coined the term "neutrino".
- Peter Bessone, 76, American NHL player (Detroit Red Wings).
- Nathan Huggins, 62, American historian and author, cancer.
- Sofiya Kalistratova, 82, Soviet lawyer and human rights activist.
- Li Keran, 82, Chinese painter and art educator, heart attack.
- George Machin, 66, British politician, Member of Parliament.
- Tadeusz Miksa, 63, Polish footballer (Lechia Gdańsk).
- John Pritchard, 68, English conductor, music director of the San Francisco Opera, lung cancer.
- George Selden, 60, American author (The Cricket in Times Square), gastrointestinal hemorrhage.

=== 6 ===
- Frances Bavier, 86, American stage and television actress (The Andy Griffith Show), heart failure.
- Cecil Cathers, 88, Canadian politician, member of the House of Commons of Canada (1957-1962).
- C. L. Dellums, 89, American labor activist, leader of the Brotherhood of Sleeping Car Porters.
- Sammy Fain, 87, American composer ("Let a Smile Be Your Umbrella", "I'll Be Seeing You"), heart attack.
- David Hardman, 88, British politician, Member of Parliament.
- Rolf Johannesson, 89, Nazi German and West German naval admiral.
- Marc Lépine, 25, Canadian mass murderer (École Polytechnique massacre), suicide.
- Mélinée Manouchian, 75–76, French-Armenian member of the French Resistance and widow of Missak Manouchian.
- Art Parks, 78, American Major League baseball player (Brooklyn Dodgers).
- John Payne, 77, American film actor (Miracle on 34th Street, The Restless Gun), heart failure.
- Ćamil Sijarić, 75, Yugoslavian novelist and short story writer, traffic collision.
- Gaston Van Roy, 73, Belgian Olympic sports shooter (1952).

=== 7 ===
- Haystacks Calhoun, 55, American professional wrestler.
- Phil Dokes, 34, American NFL footballer (Buffalo Bills), heart failure.
- Hans Hartung, 85, German-French abstract painter and soldier.
- Lucien Le Guével, 74, French racing cyclist.
- Carlos DeLuna, 27, American convicted murderer, executed.
- Stuart Novins, 75, American television journalist, CBS News correspondent, respiratory failure.
- Sirima, 25, English-French singer, murdered.
- Vadim Spiridonov, 45, Soviet film actor and director, heart failure.
- Luis Calderón Vega, 77–78, Mexican politician and writer, co-founder of the National Action Party.
- Melchior Wezel, 86, Swiss gymnast and Olympic gold medalist (1928).

=== 8 ===
- Albert Barrett, 86, English footballer (Fulham).
- Bruno Carette, 33, French humorist and comedian, member of Les Nuls.
- Szymon Datner, 87, Polish historian and Holocaust survivor.
- Max Grundig, 81, German businessman, founder of Grundig AG.
- Mykola Livytskyi, 82, Soviet Ukrainian politician, prime minister and president of the Ukrainian People's Republic in exile.
- Stanley Steingut, 69, American politician, speaker of the New York State Assembly, lung cancer.

=== 9 ===
- Brett Austin, 30, New Zealand swimmer and Olympian (1984).
- Edward J. Bloustein, 64, American president of Rutgers University, heart attack.
- Gunnar Bøe, 72, Norwegian politician and economist.
- William P. Ennis, 85, American general in the United States Army.
- Bob Friedman, 68, American NFL player (Philadelphia Eagles).
- Basil Hayward, 61, English footballer and manager (Port Vale), heart attack.
- Takeshi Kaikō, 58, Japanese novelist, short-story writer and journalist, esophageal cancer.
- Doug Scovil, 62, American football player and NFL coach (Philadelphia Eagles), heart attack.
- S. Somasundaram, 70, Indian Carnatic vocalist.
- R. G. Springsteen, 85, American B movie and television director.

=== 10 ===
- Frank Baker, 71, English footballer (Stoke City).
- Sam Barkas, 79, English footballer and manager (Bradford City, England).
- Paul Collaer, 98, Belgian musicologist, pianist and conductor.
- George Edmonds, 96, English professional footballer (Wolverhampton Wanderers).
- Nico Gardener, 83, Latvian-born British bridge player.
- Frank Gulotta, 82, American judge, diabetes.
- Frederick Hedges, 86, Canadian rower and Olympic medalist (1928).
- Robin Hughes, 69, Argentinian-born British actor, liver disease.
- Steve Sebo, 75, American football and baseball player and coach.
- Harold Thomas, 75, Welsh rugby union and rugby league player (Salford, Wales).
- Huang Zhen, 80, Chinese politician, ambassador to Hungary, Indonesia and France.

=== 11 ===
- Allez France, 19, American Thoroughbred racehorse.
- Carlos Almaraz, 48, Mexican-born American artist, AIDS.
- John Buxton, 76, British poet and ornithologist.
- Lindsay Crosby, 51, American actor and singer, suicide.
- Louise Dahl-Wolfe, 94, American photographer (Harper's Bazaar), pneumonia.
- Alfred Ferraz, 82, French architect.
- Howard Lang, 78, English actor (The Onedin Line).

=== 12 ===
- Carlos Barral, 60–61, Spanish poet and politician, member of the European Parliament, abdominal aortic aneurysm.
- Sid Colin, 74, English scriptwriter (The Army Game).
- Helen Creighton, 90, Canadian folklorist and author.
- Charles Fosset, 79, French footballer.
- Bill Kennedy, 77, Scottish footballer (Southampton).
- Fernand Le Heurteur, 84, French Olympic long-distance runner (1936).
- Suihō Tagawa, 90, Japanese manga artist.

=== 13 ===
- Paul Crowe, 65, American NFL footballer (San Francisco 49ers).
- Peter de la Mare, 69, New Zealand physical organic chemist.
- Michele Fanelli, 82, Italian long-distance runner and Olympian (1932).
- Sammy Lerner, 86, Romanian-born American film and musical songwriter, cancer.
- Roderick Mackenzie, 85, Scottish soldier and peer, chief of Clan Mackenzie.
- Felix McGrogan, 75, Scottish footballer (Kilmarnock).
- Stan Randall, 81, Canadian businessman and politician, member of the Legislative Assembly of Ontario.
- Jack Showell, 74, Australian rules footballer.

=== 14 ===
- Lucien Aguettand, 88, French art director.
- Reuben Bennett, 75, Scottish professional footballer and manager (Hull City).
- Robert D. Blue, 91, American politician, governor of Iowa, stroke.
- Ants Eskola, 81, Estonian actor, singer and artist.
- Willy Fascher, 77, German Olympic fencer (1952).
- Gerry Healy, 76, British political activist, leader of the Workers Revolutionary Party.
- Seiichi Katsumata, 81, Japanese politician, Soviet spy, member of the House of Representatives.
- Jock Mahoney, 70, American actor and stuntman (The Range Rider), stroke.
- Frederick Nolting, 78, American diplomat, ambassador to South Vietnam, cardio-pulmonary arrest.
- Georges Poitou, 63, French mathematician.
- Andrei Sakharov, 68, Soviet nuclear physicist and Nobel laureate in Physics, dilated cardiomyopathy.
- Howard Walton, 73, British tennis and table tennis player.

=== 15 ===
- Anders "Akka" Andersson, 52, Swedish ice hockey player and dual Olympian (1960, 1964).
- Ben Barzman, 79, Canadian journalist, screenwriter and novelist (El Cid), stroke.
- Emile de Antonio, 70, American documentary director (Rush to Judgment), heart attack.
- José Gonzalo Rodríguez Gacha, 42, Colombian drug lord, leader of the Medellín Cartel, shot.
- Lloyd Gronsdahl, 68, Canadian NHL player (Boston Bruins).
- Charles Holland, 81, British road-racing cyclist and Olympic medalist (1932, 1936).
- Mikhail Kuznetsov, 76, Soviet flying ace, Hero of the Soviet Union.
- Philly Lutaaya, 38, Ugandan musician, AIDS.
- Arnold Moss, 79, American actor, lung cancer.
- Diptendu Pramanick, 79, Indian film personality.
- Ali Şen, 70, Turkish actor.
- Vanja Sutlić, 64, Yugoslavian philosopher.
- Edward Underdown, 81, English actor.

=== 16 ===
- Niccolo d'Ardia Caracciolo, 48, Irish artist, traffic collision.
- Oscar Alfredo Gálvez, 76, Argentinian racing driver, pancreatic cancer.
- Charlie Long, 51, American AFL football player (Boston Patriots).
- Silvana Mangano, 59, Italian film actress (The Verona Trial), lung cancer.
- Umberto Micco, 73, Italian Olympic field hockey player (1952), and politician.
- Gianni Poggi, 68, Italian tenor.
- Aileen Pringle, 94, American stage and silent-screen actress.
- John Ramsbotham, 83, British Anglican clergyman, Bishop of Wakefield.
- René Tavernier, 74, French poet and philosopher.
- Lee Van Cleef, 64, American actor (The Good, the Bad and the Ugly), heart attack.
- Robert Smith Vance, 58, American judge, letter bomb.
- Marjorie Westbury, 84, English radio actress and singer.
- Priscilla White, 89, American diabetes researcher, heart attack.

=== 17 ===
- Gilbert Allart, 87, French hurdler and Olympian (1924).
- Walt Bachrach, 84, American politician, mayor of Cincinnati, stroke.
- Edward Boyd, 72–73, Scottish writer (The View from Daniel Pike).
- Zeb Eaton, 69, American Major League baseball player (Detroit Tigers).
- Ghalib Halasa, 57, Jordanian novelist and short story writer.
- Gustav Engel, 96, German historian.
- Josephine Hill, 90, American silent-screen actress.
- Asen Panchev, 83, Bulgarian international footballer (Levski Sofia, Bulgaria).
- Luciano Salce, 67, Italian film director and actor (Le pillole di Ercole), myocardial infarction.
- Gheorghe Vlădescu-Răcoasa, 94, Romanian politician, journalist and diplomat, ambassador to the Soviet Union.
- Albert Coady Wedemeyer, 93, American army general.
- William Wiswesser, 75, American chemist (Wiswesser line notation).

=== 18 ===
- Ewen Bain, 64, Scottish cartoonist (Angus Og), influenza.
- Brad Beckman, 24, American NFL football player (New York Giants), traffic collision.
- Olwen Brogan, 89, British archaeologist.
- Bobby Capó, 67, Puerto Rican musician, heart attack.
- George Harvie-Watt, 86, British barrister and politician, Member of Parliament.
- Sydney Irving, 71, British politician, Member of Parliament.
- Enar Josefsson, 73, Swedish cross-country skier and Olympic medalist (1952).
- Jack Kilpatrick, 72, British ice hockey player and Olympic gold medalist (1936).
- Louise Little, early 90s, Grenadian-born American activist.
- Jerzy Rutkowski, 75, Polish political activist and resistance fighter.
- Robert E. Robinson, 42, American attorney and council member, murdered.
- William Saltonstall, 84, American educator, principal of Phillips Exeter Academy.
- Stanley Senanayake, 72, Sri Lankan police officer, Inspector General of the Sri Lanka Police.
- Norbert Staudt, 82, Luxembourgian Olympic water polo player (1928).
- Jean Strauss, 77, Luxembourgish sprint canoeist and Olympian (1936).

=== 19 ===
- Herbert Blaize, 71, Grenadian politician, prime minister of Grenada, prostate cancer.
- Abdul Jalil Choudhury, 63–64, Bengali Deobandi Islamic scholar and politician, member of Assam Legislative Assembly.
- Audrey Christie, 77, American actress, singer and dancer (The Voice of the Turtle), emphysema.
- Lois Darling, 72, American author and illustrator, leukemia.
- Halfdan Ditlev-Simonsen Jr., 65, Norwegian Olympic sailor (1956).
- Barthold Fles, 87, Dutch-born American literary agent and author, diabetes.
- Stella Gibbons, 87, English author, journalist and poet (Cold Comfort Farm).
- John Heddle, 46, British politician, Member of Parliament, suicide.
- Floyd Jones, 72, American blues musician (On the Road Again), heart failure.
- Óndra Łysohorsky, 84, Czech poet.
- Kirill Mazurov, 75, Soviet politician, First Secretary of the Communist Party of Byelorussia.
- Rafaelito Ortiz, 75, Puerto Rican Negro Leagues baseball player (Chicago American Giants).
- Georges Rouquier, 80, French film director, screenwriter and actor.
- Lucien Spronck, 50, Belgian footballer.
- Henry Theel, 72, Finnish singer.

=== 20 ===
- Irma Beilke, 85, German operatic soprano and concert singer (Städtische Oper Berlin).
- Kurt Böhme, 81, German bass.
- Elisheva Cohen, 78, German-born Israeli designer and museum curator.
- Gentry Crowell, 57, American politician, Tennessee Secretary of State, suicide.
- John Currie, 79, Canadian Olympic cross-country skier (1932).
- Jiro Harada, 95, Japanese general in the Imperial Japanese Army.
- Donald L. McFaul, 32, American Navy SEAL, killed in U.S. invasion of Panama.

=== 21 ===
- Ján Cikker, 78, Slovak composer.
- Sir Hugh Elliott, 76, British ornithologist, conservationist and hereditary peer.
- Inma de Santis, 30, Spanish actress, car accident.
- Rotimi Fani-Kayode, 34, Nigerian-born English photographer, AIDS.
- Elsie Griffin, 94, English opera singer.
- Harry Hibbs, 47, Canadian musician, cancer.
- Ralph "Blackie" Schwamb, 63, American Major League baseball player (St. Louis Browns) and convicted murderer.
- David Schwartz, 73, American judge (United States Court of Claims).
- Soedjatmoko, 67, Indonesian politician and diplomat, ambassador to the United States, cardiac arrest.
- Ethel Swanbeck, 96, American politician, member of Ohio House of Representatives.
- José Zacarías Tallet, 96, Cuban writer.
- Dwane Wallace, 78, American aircraft designer, president of Cessna.
- Edmund Warwick, 82, British actor.

=== 22 ===
- Andrés do Barro, 42, Spanish singer-songwriter, liver cancer.
- Samuel Beckett, 83, Irish-French novelist, playwright and short story writer, Nobel laureate in Literature, emphysema.
- Howard Bowen, 81, American economist, president of Grinnell College and the University of Iowa.
- Theodore M. Burton, 82, American Mormon Genealogical Department director.
- Archie Campbell, 86, American Major League baseball player (Cincinnati Reds).
- Giorgio Cavallon, 85, Italian-born American abstract artist.
- Harry Kraf, 82, American politician, member of the New York State Senate.
- Vasile Milea, 62, Romanian general and politician, Minister of National Defence, suicide.
- Gustavo Pizarro, 73, Chilean international footballer.
- Massimo Serato, 72, Italian film actor (El Cid, The Sun Still Rises), heart attack.

=== 23 ===
- Jeff Alexander, 79, American conductor, arranger and composer, cancer.
- Peter Bennett, 72, British stage and television actor.
- John Cavendish, 73, British politician (House of Lords).
- Milko Gaydarski, 43, Bulgarian international footballer and Olympic medalist (Levski Sofia, Bulgaria).
- Clem Hawke, 91, Australian politician, father of Bob Hawke, stroke.
- Shahzad Khalil, 44–45, Pakistani television director and producer (Tanhaiyaan), heart attack.
- Lord Richard Percy, 68, English zoologist.
- Richard Rado, 83, German-born British mathematician (Erdős–Rado theorem).
- Lennart Strandberg, 74, Swedish sprinter and Olympian (1936).
- William W. Ullery, 92, American NFL player (Dayton Triangles).

=== 24 ===
- Victor Fontana, 41, Romanian biathlete and Olympian (1972, 1976), shot.
- Danny Huwé, 46, Belgian journalist, shot by sniper.
- Charles Moore, 79, British hereditary peer, managing director of the Financial Times.
- Ernest Nathan Morial, 60, American politician, Mayor of New Orleans, heart attack.
- Florică Murariu, 34, Romanian international rugby union player (Steaua București, Romania), shot.
- Roger Pigaut, 70, French actor and film director, cardiovascular disease.
- Ollie Savatsky, 78, American NFL footballer (Cleveland Rams).

=== 25 ===
- Benny Binion, 85, American career criminal who established illegal gambling operations, heart failure.
- Gus Dahlström, 83, Swedish film actor.
- Betty Garde, 84, American actress (Call Northside 777, Cry of the City).
- Türkan Hanımsultan, 70, Ottoman princess and chemical engineer, daughter of Enver Pasha.
- George Hotchkiss, 83, American NBL basketball coach (Oshkosh All-Stars).
- Frederick F. Houser, 85, American politician and judge, Lieutenant Governor of California, heart attack.
- Masaad Kassis, 71, Israeli Arab politician, member of the Knesset.
- Joseph Livingston, 84, American business journalist and columnist, Pulitzer Prize winner.
- Jean-Étienne Marie, 72, French composer of contemporary music.
- Billy Martin, 61, American Major League baseball player and manager (New York Yankees), traffic collision.
- Riccardo Morandi, 87, Italian civil engineer, noted for his bridge designs.
- Robert Pirosh, 79, American screenwriter and director (Battleground, Go for Broke!), heart failure.
- Bo Randall, 80, American knifemaker, founded Randall Made Knives.
- Wally Ris, 65, American swimmer, dual Olympic gold medalist (1948) and world record holder.
- Domenico Scala, 86, Italian cinematographer (Ossessione).
- A. J. Seymour, 75, Guyanese poet, essayist and memoirist.
- Romanian politicians executed by firing squad:
  - Elena Ceaușescu, 73, deputy prime minister
  - Nicolae Ceaușescu, 71, president

=== 26 ===
- Lennox Berkeley, 86, English composer, respiratory infection.
- Walter Bromley-Davenport, 86, British politician, Member of Parliament.
- Sybil Cholmondeley, 95, British noblewoman and socialite, Chief Staff Officer in the Women's Royal Naval Service.
- Buck Crump, 85, Canadian president of the Canadian Pacific Railway.
- Doug Harvey, 65, Canadian NHL ice hockey player (Montreal Canadiens), cirrhosis.
- Kōyō Ishikawa, 85, Japanese photographer.
- Paul Jennings, 71, English author.
- Roy Joiner, 83, American baseball player (Chicago Cubs).
- K. P. Krishnakumar, 31, Indian sculptor and painter, suicide.
- Jörgen Lehmann, 91, Danish-Swedish physician and chemist (tuberculosis).
- James J. Manderino, 57, American politician, speaker of the Pennsylvania House of Representatives, heart attack.
- Maryon Pearson, 88, Canadian spouse of the prime minister.
- K. Shankar Pillai, 87, Indian cartoonist, founded Shankar's Weekly.
- Mohan Singh, 80, Indian army general and politician, member of the Rajya Sabha, cancer.
- Peggy Thorpe-Bates, 75, English actress (Rumpole of the Bailey).
- Seán Walsh, 64, Irish politician.
- William Wyatt, 96, British Olympic weightlifter (1924).

=== 27 ===
- Rodney Arismendi, 76, Uruguayan politician and political writer.
- Kurt Baum, 89, Austro-Hungarian–born American tenor (Metropolitan Opera).
- Maurice Dunkley, 75, English footballer (Manchester City) and first-class cricketer (Northamptonshire).
- Finlay Hart, 87–88, Scottish communist politician.
- Gene Johnson, 87, American football and basketball coach, created the full-court press.
- Dada Amir Haider Khan, 89, Pakistani communist activist.
- Gerard Maarse, 60, Dutch speed skater and dual Olympian (1952, 1956).
- Arthur Rhames, 32, American guitarist, tenor saxophonist, and pianist, AIDS.
- Walter Rose, 77, German footballer and manager (SpVgg Leipzig).
- John Monteath Robertson, 89, Scottish chemist and crystallographer.
- Branko Tretinjak, 82, Yugoslavian Olympic fencer (1936).
- Ron Ulmer, 76, New Zealand track cyclist and national champion.
- George William Weidler, 63, American saxophonist and songwriter, husband of Doris Day.

=== 28 ===
- Solomon Birnbaum, 98, Austro-Hungarian, British and Canadian expert in Yiddish linguistics and Hebrew paleography.
- Marin Ceaușescu, 73, Romanian economist and diplomat, brother of Nicolae Ceaușescu, suicide.
- Brian Coburn, 53, English actor who portrayed himself as Scottish.
- Earl Patrick Freeman, 57, Canadian professional wrestler, heart attack.
- Karl Humenberger, 83, Austrian footballer and manager (Floridsdorfer AC, Austria).
- Ave Kaplan, 90, American football player.
- Pavel Kurochkin, 89, Soviet army general.
- Ricardo López Méndez, 86, Mexican poet and lyricist ("Amor").
- Hermann Oberth, 95, Austro-Hungarian–born German physicist and rocket pioneer.
- Ian Parry, 24, British photographer and photojournalist, plane crash.
- Charles Rinker, 78, American lyricist.
- William Scott, 76, Northern Irish abstract painter, Alzheimer's disease.

=== 29 ===
- Süreyya Ağaoğlu, 86, Azerbaijani-born Turkish writer and lawyer, cerebral hemorrhage.
- Adrien Albert, 82, Australian medicinal chemist.
- Scott Burton, 50, American sculptor, AIDS.
- Saman Piyasiri Fernando, 31, Sri Lankan politician, leader of the Janatha Vimukthi Peramuna, murdered.
- Hap Glaudi, 77, American sportscaster (WWL-TV), lung cancer.
- Marion Keisker, 72, American record producer, first person to record Elvis Presley.
- Saša Večtomov (born Alexandr Večtomov), 59, Czech cellist, suicide.
- Bernard Lewis Welch, 77–78, British statistician (Welch's t-test), stroke.

=== 30 ===
- Sten Abel, 90, Norwegian sailor and Olympic medalist (1920).
- Øyvind Anker, 85, Norwegian librarian.
- Charles H. Blosser, 94, American after whom Blosser Municipal Airport is named.
- Augusto Del Noce, 79, Italian philosopher and political thinker.
- Paul-Henri Grauwin, 75, French army doctor.
- Etienne Leroux, 67, South African writer.
- Esther McCoy, 85, American architectural historian and author, emphysema.
- Yasuji Miyazaki, 73, Japanese swimmer and Olympic gold medalist (1932).
- Fumiteru Nakano, 74, Japanese tennis player.
- Madoline Thomas, 99, Welsh actress, complications from broken hip.

=== 31 ===
- Christia Adair, 96, American suffragist and civil rights activist.
- Ed Bogdanski, 68, American basketball player.
- Lilly Daché, 97, French-born American hatmaker.
- Georges de Bourguignon, 79, Belgian fencer and Olympic medalist (1932, 1936, 1948, 1952).
- Margaret Gordon, 50, British children's book illustrator (The Wombles).
- Clarence Hammar, 90, Swedish sailor and Olympic medallist (1924, 1928).
- Ignatius Kilage, 48, Papua New Guinean politician, Governor-General of Papua New Guinea.
- Mihály Lantos, 61, Hungarian international footballer and manager (MTK Hungária, Hungary).
- Veli Leskinen, 82, Finnish Olympic footballer (1936).
- Francis B. Loomis Jr., 86, American general in the U.S. Marine Corps.
- Wendell Mosley, 57, American football player and coach.
- Bendt Rothe, 68, Danish actor (Gertrud).
- Gerhard Schröder, 79, West German politician, Minister of Defence.
- Madhuri Singh, 66, Indian politician, member of Lok Sabha.

=== Unknown date ===
- Martin Bartesch, 63, Romanian-born member of the SS (Mauthausen concentration camp).
- Ruth Moore, 85–86, American writer.
- Nora O'Mahoney, 76–77, Irish actress and lay missionary (Darby O'Gill and the Little People).
- Dietrich Prinz, 86, German-born computer science pioneer.
- Yem Sambaur, 76, Cambodian politician, Prime Minister of Cambodia.
