= De Galard =

de Galard may refer to:

- Geneviève de Galard (1925–2024), French nurse
- Gustave de Galard (1779–1841), French painter and designer
- René de Galard de Béarn, Marquis de Brassac (1699–1771), French soldier and amateur composer

== See also ==
- De Galard Family
