= James O'Rourke =

James O'Rourke may refer to:

== Sports ==
- Jim O'Rourke (baseball) (1850–1919), American baseball player and Hall of Fame inductee
- Jimmy O'Rourke (baseball) (1883–1955), American baseball player, son of the Hall of Fame inductee
- James O'Rourke (footballer) (1912-1986), English footballer, see List of Bury F.C. players (1–24 appearances)
- James O'Rourke (canoeist) (1915–1983), American canoeist who competed at the 1936 Summer Olympics
- James O'Rourke Jr. (born 1942), his son, American sprint canoeist
- Jimmy O'Rourke (footballer) (1946–2022), Scottish footballer

== Others ==
- Jim O'Rourke (musician) (born 1969), American musician and filmmaker
- Jim O'Rourke (politician), American politician
