= Colin Mackay =

Colin Mackay or MacKay may refer to:

- Colin MacKay (footballer) (1908–1989), Australian rules footballer
- Colin B. Mackay (1920–2003), president of the University of New Brunswick, 1953–1969
- Sir Colin Mackay (judge) (1943–2026), British High Court judge
- Colin MacKay (journalist, born 1944) (1944–2023), Scottish journalist
- Colin Mackay (writer) (1951–2003), poet and novelist
- Colin Mackay (journalist) (fl. 1999–2023), Scottish journalist, Holyrood editor on STV News
