= Otakar Kouba =

Czechoslovak canoeist

Otakar Kouba (24 October 1906 – January 1983) was a Czech canoeist who competed for Czechoslovakia in the 1936 Summer Olympics.

He was born in Prague on 24 October 1906. In 1936 he and his partner Ludvík Klíma finished fifth in the folding K-2 10000 m event.

Kouba died in January 1983, at the age of 76.
