= Erich Hanisch =

German canoeist

Personal information
- Born: Wilhelm Rudolf Erich Hanisch; 28 March 1909 Berlin
- Died: unknown

Sport
- Sport: Kayaking
- Event: Folding kayak
Medal record
Men's canoe sprint
Representing Germany
Olympic Games
Silver medal – second place	1936 Berlin	Folding K-2 10000 m

Wilhelm Rudolf Erich Hanisch (born 28 March 1909) was a German sprint canoeist, born in Berlin, who competed in the 1936 Summer Olympics.

In 1936, he won the silver medal in the folding K-2 10000 metre competition with his partner Willi Horn.
