= 1960 Force Publique mutinies =

Army mutinies in the Republic of the Congo

- Part of Congo Crisis
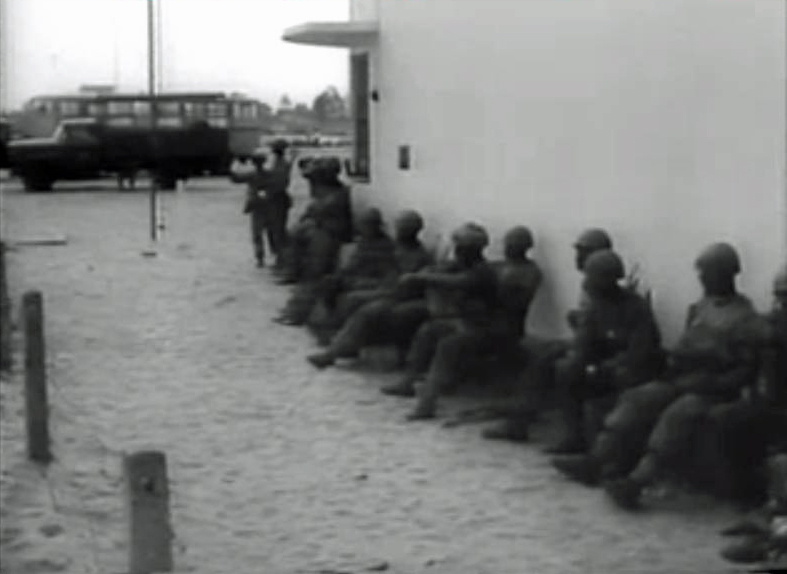
- Congolese troops in early July 1960
- Date: July 1960
- Location: Léopoldville and Thysville, later other places in the Lower Congo
- Type: Mutiny, riots, protests
- Cause: Discontent about repression, racial segregation, and slow progress of reforms in the Force Publique
- Motive: Replacement of European officers (particularly Émile Janssens) in the Force Publique; reorganisation of the army
- Participants: Mutinous Congolese soldiers Belgian metropolitan troops Congolese government and loyal armed forces
- Outcome: Belgian military intervention to protect citizens. Nomination of black officers.

On 5 July 1960, soldiers of the garrisons of Léopoldville and Thysville of the Force Publique, the army of the newly independent Republic of the Congo, mutinied against their white officers. The revolt quickly spread throughout the Bas-Congo and engulfed the country in disorder, beginning the Congo Crisis.

== Background ==
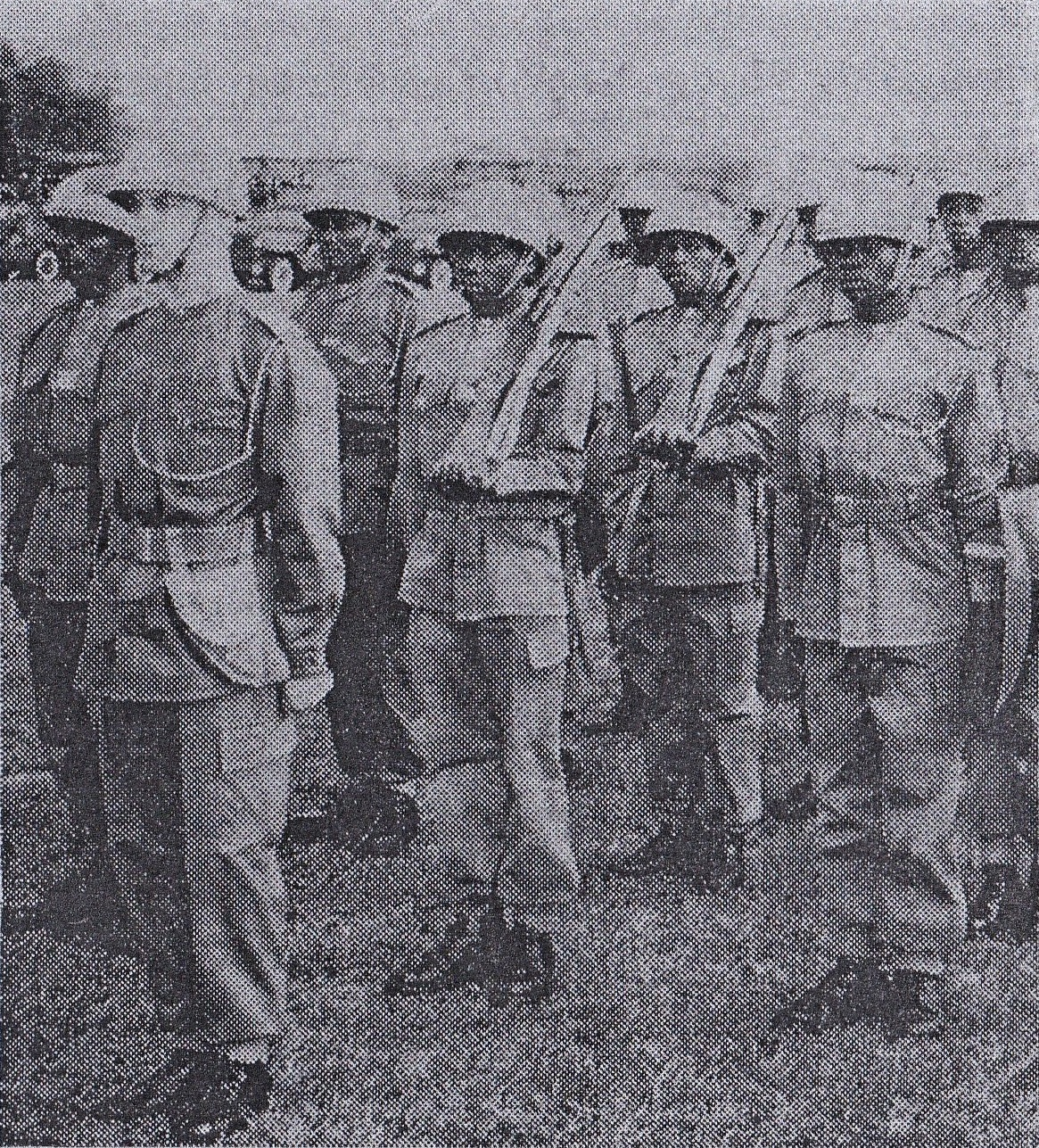
Gendarmerie in Léopoldville, 1959. Unlike the rest of the Force Publique, the gendarmerie remained mostly loyal during the mutiny.

The Force Publique was long characterised by repressive police actions and entrenched racial segregation. With the exception of 10 adjutants appointed shortly before independence, no Congolese soldier was able to advance past the rank of sergeant. Many hoped that independence would result in immediate promotions and material gains, but were disappointed by Prime Minister Patrice Lumumba's slow pace of reform. The rank-and-file felt that the Congolese political class—particularly ministers in the new government—were enriching themselves while failing to improve the troops' situation. There was dissatisfaction that Lumumba had appointed an unpopular colonel, van Hoorebeke, to a high post in the Ministry of Defence, and the troops from Équateur and southern Kasai were additionally upset that Jean Bolikango and Albert Kalonji were not included in the new government. Many of the soldiers were also fatigued from maintaining order during the elections and participating in independence celebrations.

On 27 June the Lumumba Government established a committee to draft a Treaty of Friendship, Assistance, and Co-operation to be signed with Belgium. It stipulated that the Belgian civil servants in the Congo and the Belgian officers of the Force Publique would remain at their posts and receive compensation from the Belgian government. It also allowed for Belgian metropolitan troops to continue to garrison the bases of Kitona and Kamina until another agreement could arrange the installations' handover to the Congolese government. The text of the treaty was hurriedly finished and on 29 June the agreement was signed by Belgian Prime Minister Gaston Eyskens, Belgian Foreign Minister Pierre Wigny, Lumumba, and Congolese Minister of Foreign Affairs Justin Bomboko.

Independence Day, 30 June 1960, was a Thursday. It was followed by a long weekend of festivities that occurred in relative calm across the country. In Léopoldville, the capital, sporadic fighting took place between factions that were dissatisfied by the result of presidential election. On the morning of 4 July workers in Coquilhatville, the capital of Équateur Province, began striking. The Force Publique was called into service and opened fire on the crowds, killing nine people. The strikebreaking action was the last official undertaking of the Force before the mutiny began. That same day the Congolese cabinet convened to discuss reforming the national institutions. They resolved to establish a committee to examine reorganisation of the army, paying special attention to eliminating racial discrimination.

Meanwhile, at Camp Léopold II, the chief military installation in Léopoldville, officers observed a high level of excitement among the Congolese ranks. One non-commissioned officer began telling his fellow soldiers that since the Congo was independent they were not required to adhere to the Belgians' orders. At 17:00 General Émile Janssens, commander-in-chief of the Force Publique, arrived and personally demoted him. Three undisciplined soldiers were placed in a holding cell, though two were provisionally released to Secretary of State for National Defence Albert Nyembo, who was informed of the incident. In the evening Janssens heard on a radio broadcast of the government's intent to set up a committee to reorganise the army. He was outraged that he had not been consulted.

== The mutiny ==
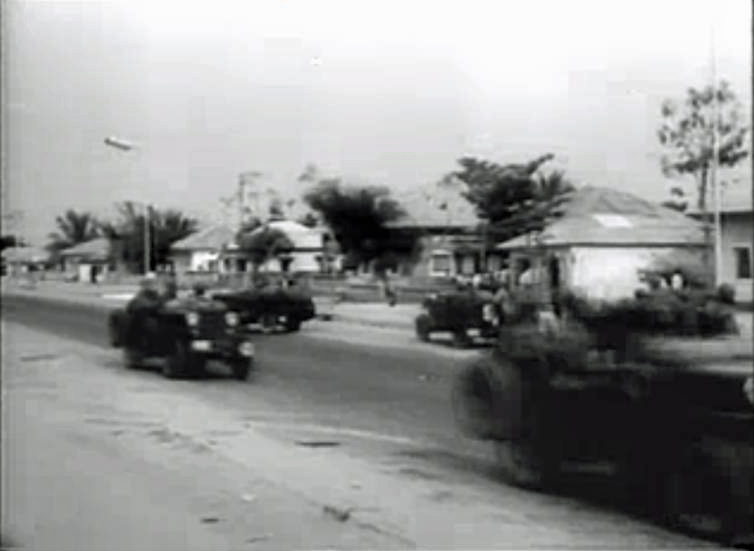
Force Publique troops on the streets of Léopoldville during the mutiny

On the morning of 5 July General Janssens, in response to increasing unrest among the Congolese ranks, summoned all troops on duty at Camp Léopold II. He demanded that the army maintain its discipline and wrote "before independence = after independence" on a black board to emphasise that the situation would not change. That evening the Congolese sacked the canteen in protest at Janssens. He alerted the reserve garrison of Camp Hardy, 95 miles away in Thysville. The officers tried organising a convoy to send to Camp Léopold II to restore order, but the men mutinied and seized the armoury. The "Congo Crisis" which followed would come to dominate the tenure of the Lumumba Government.

The following morning some groups of soldiers drove from Thysville to Inkisi, Madimba, and Mbanza-Boma, spreading the mutiny and raping two women. Meanwhile, Janssens finalised plans to attack Camp Hardy and had alerted the commander of the Belgian metropolitan troops in the Congo. The government countermanded his order and instead dispatched Mobutu, Charles Kisolokele, and the Vice President of Léopoldville Province to negotiate with the mutineers. They succeeded in releasing the captive Europeans and began evacuating them to the capital. Bands of angry soldiers roamed the capital, and Lumumba interrupted a cabinet meeting at his residence to invite one group to share its grievances. In an attempt to placate the mutinous troops, he dismissed Janssens and promoted every soldier by one grade. He also dismissed the Belgian officer in charge of the Sûreté and forced him into exile, precipitating a collapse of the organisation completed by the departure of most other Belgian personnel.

The spread of the mutiny to garrisons throughout the country developed as troops—not yet aware of Lumumba's reforms—grew fearful over various rumours. Growing suspicion and division between the officers and ranks at the Kongolo garrison led the officers to place gasoline drums in the camp's armoury so that it could be destroyed in an emergency. The soldiers, wary of being killed, broke into the armoury and assaulted two officers. In the ensuing clash one Belgian and one Congolese were killed, marking the first deaths of the mutiny. In Léopoldville, several Congolese soldiers were convinced that Lumumba had brought Soviet troops into the country to disarm the Force Publique. Angered by this, they stormed the hotel rooms of the Soviet delegation which had been present for the independence celebrations. Upon hearing what had occurred, Lumumba directed Bomboko to assume responsibility of the security of all foreign delegations present in the Congo and ensure that the Soviets could safely leave the country. Bomboko ordered Minister-Delegate to the United Nations Thomas Kanza to escort the delegation to N'djili Airport where they both convinced the Congolese soldiers to allow the Soviets to depart in peace.

On 7 July formal negotiations between the mutineers and the government on the reorganisation of army began. A delegation of Congolese soldiers met with Lumumba to demand immediate wage increases, promotions, and the dismissal of their white officers. The government became even more concerned about the situation when a ministerial car was stoned. Though the situation in the capital was relatively calm, anxiety grew among the European community, which began to arms itself with weapons from illegal stockpiles. Belgian civilians began seeking passage to the French Congo or refuge in the Belgian embassy to await repatriation. Bomboko and Minister Resident in Belgium Albert Delvaux devoted much of their time to assisting them. The provincial presidents, who had been summoned to the capital, met with the Council of Ministers to discuss domestic security in the context of the mutiny.

=== Government response ===
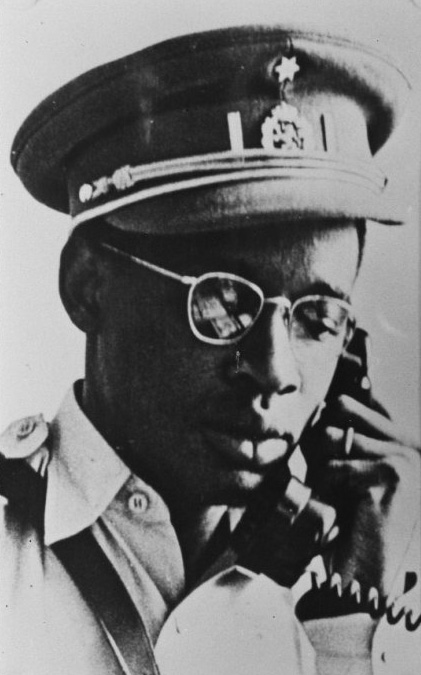
Joseph-Désiré Mobutu, appointed chief of staff of the Armée Nationale Congolaise

On 8 July the full Council of Ministers convened in an extraordinary session under the chairmanship of Kasa-Vubu at Camp Léopold II in Léopoldville to address the task of Africanising the garrison. By then the severity of the mutiny had convinced the ministers that radical reform was necessary in order to maintain the army's discipline. The soldiers on guard prevented them from leaving until they had decided upon their course of action. The Council first heard soldier delegations' grievances; the root cause of their dissatisfaction was that the army's leadership was wholly European despite independence from Belgium. After allowing for the election of a new commandant for the garrison, the ministers debated over who would make a suitable army chief of staff. The two main candidates for the post were Maurice Mpolo and Mobutu. The former had shown some influence over the mutinying troops, but Kasa-Vubu and the Bakongo ministers feared that he would enact a coup d'état if he were given power. The latter was perceived as calmer and more thoughtful.

Lumumba saw Mpolo as courageous, but favored Mobutu's prudence. As the discussions continued, the cabinet began to divide themselves according to who they preferred to serve as chief of staff. Lumumba wanted to keep both men in his government and wished to avoid upsetting one of their camps of supporters. During a break he asked Thomas Kanza whether he thought his father, Daniel Kanza, might ultimately make an optimal chief of staff. Though Thomas Kanza told him that Kasa-Vubu and the Bakongo ministers would never accept such a proposal, Lumumba introduced the idea when the ministers reconvened. Kasa-Vubu received the idea in silence, implying his deep displeasure, and Bomboko, Jacques Lumbala, and Delvaux all continuously pushed for Mobutu to be made chief of staff. In the end Mobutu was given the role and awarded the rank of colonel. The ministers then decided that the Minister of Defence should appoint a Congolese sergeant major to replace Janssens as commander-in-chief of the army with the rank of general. Lumumba, at the suggestion of Rémy Mwamba, selected Victor Lundula for the role. (Note: Mwamba had believed that Mobutu was too young for the role of commander-in-chief, though other ministers felt otherwise. They accepted his proposal of Lundula when it was agreed that Mobutu would be chief of staff.) In addition to the appointments a state committee for the army—officially renamed the Armée Nationale Congolaise (Note: Sources do not agree on when the name change was applied. Gibbs says it occurred on Independence Day, while Gerard and Kuklick list it as a government reform in response to the mutiny. Vanderstraeten portrays it as a result of the 'extraordinary ministerial council' of 8 July at Camp Léopold II.) (ANC)—was formed and put under the charge of a Congolese officer. It was further determined that the President would ex officio be the supreme commander of the military, the Prime Minister and Minister of Defence would control the army in a structure approved by Parliament, and all army units would be placed under the command of Congolese officers. Delegations were to be dispatched across the country to implement the latter reform. The ministers resolved to retain all Belgian officers "prepared to serve the Congo loyally" and guarantee the security of their income, families, and property so they could act as advisers to their successors.

"The head of state and all members of the government solemnly appeal to the whole population, to all soldiers and police, to reestablish order and return to work. The needful arrangements are being made to secure the safety and protection of people and property."

— Extract from the government communique of 8 July

The ministers decided it would be best to publicise their decisions as soon as possible. Immediately after the Council adjourned the garrison of Camp Léopold II was summoned to the barrack square. Lumumba, acting in his capacity as Minister of Defence, announced the actions the government was taking to address the army's grievances. A communique was distributed by the secretariat of the Council of Ministers to the press and radio, summarising the government's decisions. The Congolese soldiers were satisfied with them and tensions relaxed. Nevertheless, European civilians continued to try and flee the country.

On 9 July the government delegations left the capital to oversee the Africanisation of the ANC. Mobutu traveled to Équateur and while he was there Mpolo acted as ANC Chief of Staff. Kasa-Vubu and Lumumba went directly to Matadi, where tensions were quickly worsening. From that point until later in the month the two worked closely with one another and made most major decisions together. After appointing a new garrison commander, supervising the election of other officers, and securing the release of captive Europeans, the pair left the city to inspect other units throughout the Lower Congo. European officers handed over control to the Congolese in Kivu and Orientale without incident (the smooth transfer of power in the former owing to good co-ordination between the officers there and Provincial President Jean Miruho), but the military situation in Kasai and Katanga remained tense and was marked by violence. The government's decision to Africanise the army caused anxiety in the civilian populace of the latter province, which feared such a reform would result in the collapse of domestic security. The provincial government refused to support Africanisation and appealed directly to Belgium to intervene to resolve the situation. The troops subsequently mutinied, both in an attempt to dislodge their officers and to try and ensure that the Katangese provincial government could not effect a secession.

== Belgian intervention ==
Belgian metropolitan troops in the Congo (the commandement supérieur des forces métropolitaines, Cometro), under the command of Major-General Roger A. Gheysen, were placed on alert following the dismissal of Janssens. In Brussels, news of conflict and abuses against Europeans brought public pressure against the Belgian government to take action. Walter Ganshof van der Meersch and August de Schryver were sent to Léopoldville with an ultimatum for Lumumba: either a formal request for Belgian military assistance could be made or metropolitan troops would act on their own initiative to protect Belgian citizens. The Belgian ambassador, Jean van den Bosch, urged his government to avoid the latter at all costs. As Lumumba was not in the capital, Ganshof and de Schryver met with other ministers in an attempt to persuade them to agree to a military intervention. Discussions continued late into the evening and though some members of cabinet appeared receptive, Deputy Prime Minister Gizenga was obstinately opposed to such action and ultimately refused to consent. Overnight orders to intervene were delivered several times to the Belgian troops at Kamina base only to be repeatedly countermanded by the government. Lumumba and Kasa-Vubu were informed of the planned intervention and, though initially receptive to the idea, were disturbed that the Belgian government would not make guarantees regarding respect for Congolese sovereignty and subsequently asked that all Belgian troops be withdrawn from Congolese soil.

Regardless, the Belgians' decision to intervene ultimately prevailed and at 06:00 on 10 July metropolitan troops from Kamina flew into Élisabethville, the capital of Katanga Province, and occupied the local airport. Later that morning Bomboko met with fleeing Belgians at N'djili Airport. While there he declared that the Belgian intervention had been made at his request, though this was most likely untrue and probably only said to ease tensions. (Note: No record of any such request has ever been found, and the Belgians never cited one when attempting to justify their intervention.) In the afternoon Lumumba and Kasa-Vubu returned to the capital having successfully quelled the unrest in the Lower Congo and convinced that negotiation could resolve the situation. Later they decided to solicit aid from the UN in restructuring the Force Publique. Ministers of the cabinet met with UN representative Ralph Bunche to discuss what technical assistance the UN could offer to the Congolese administration. Bunche shortly thereafter informed Hammarskjöld of the Congolese government's intended request. By evening Lumumba had learned of the Belgian intervention in Élisabethville. He was furious that the Belgians had acted contrary to the Treaty of Friendship and delivered a response over radio:

We have just learnt that the Belgian government has sent troops to the Congo and that they have intervened. The responsibility of Belgium is great. We protest bitterly against these measures which prejudice good relations between our countries. We appeal to all Congolese to defend our Republic against those who threaten it.

"I regret, in the name of the government of our Republic, the inadmissible actions that some soldiers have perpetrated against Europeans living in this Province. Our Minister of Justice, Mr. Mwamba, has today given formal instructions to the King's Prosecutor for legal inquests to be opened immediately regarding all guilty elements."

— Extract from Lumumba's letter to the Belgian consul-general, 11 July 1960

At the same time the Belgians launched a second intervention in Luluabourg, parachuting in troops defend an office building besieged by Congolese forces. On 11 July Lumumba and Kasa-Vubu flew to the town. After overseeing the election of new officers for the garrison, Lumumba joined Kasa-Vubu in admonishing the Europeans to stay. Most refused to do so unless they had the protection of the Belgian troops. After lengthy negotiation Lumumba agreed to the condition and communicated to the Belgian consul-general that the force could remain in the province of Kasaï for two months. Back in Léopoldville, Ganshof and de Schryver continued to meet with the ministers with the hopes of establishing a mutual guarantee of security for both Europeans and Africans. Then, for reasons not entirely clear, Belgian units intervened in Matadi. (Note: The situation in Matadi was relatively calm at the time and all Europeans who had wished to leave had already done so. Some Belgian sources report that Belgian commanders were under the impression that European lives were at risk, while others state that the port was deemed strategically important in passing supplies to Léopoldville.) Fighting broke out and 12 to 18 Congolese were killed. News of the conflict (along with exaggerated casualty reports) spread to other army camps across the country, resulting in a wave of renewed mutinies and anti-Belgian hostility.

Between 10 and 18 July, Belgian forces intervened 28 times in Congolese localities. With the exception of the Luluabourg authorisation, the Belgian troops never acted with the permission of the government. Belgium also dispatched the naval Task Group 218.2, under Capitaine de vaisseau Petitjean, comprising nine vessels: the troop transport A957 Kamina, the Algerine-class F901 Lecointe, F903 Dufour, F904 De Brouwer and F905 Demoor, and the vedettes Semois, Rupel, Dender, and Ourthe. Order was ultimately restored largely through the use of the gendarmerie, a more wieldy and reliable institution than the army. The previously mutinous troops did not resist the arrival of peacekeepers with the United Nations Operation in the Congo.

== Aftermath and effects ==
The Force Publique mutiny increased the unpopularity of the army and cost the government a significant amount of support in rural areas. The insecurity they caused also impeded economic production and the distribution of goods and distracted the leadership from addressing other problems facing the administration.

The revolt was the first of many army mutinies that occurred in African states in the 1960s. In the Congo itself, Colonel Mobutu would go on to seize power later in 1960 in a coup d'état, establishing the College of Commissioners-General, which ran the government in 1960-61 under his authority. Five years later Mobutu seized power for a second time, ushering in first quasi-military but then a civilian government. His rule lasted until 1997.
