= Kees Wijdekop =

Dutch sprint canoeist

Personal information
- Full name: Cornelis Wijdekop
- Nickname: Cor
- Born: 31 January 1914 Amsterdam, Netherlands
- Died: 8 April 2008 (aged 94) Purmerend, Netherlands

Sport
- Sport: Kayaking
- Event: Folding kayak
Medal record
Men's canoe sprint
Representing Netherlands
Olympic Games
Bronze medal – third place	1936 Berlin	Folding K-2 10000 m

Cornelis Wijdekop (31 January 1914 – 8 April 2008), known as "Cor" or "Kees", was a Dutch sprint canoeist who competed in the late 1930s. He won a bronze medal in the folding K-2 10000 m event with his older brother Piet at the 1936 Summer Olympics in Berlin.

Wijdekop was born in Amsterdam, where he was an instrument maker by profession at Draka Holding. Cor and Piet were members of the canoe club De Plassers. He died in Purmerend.

== Personal life ==
Cor Wijdekop was married to Maartje Wijdekop-Stokkink. Together they had a daughter, Joke (1942), and a son, Kees (1947). Kees Wijdekop was a pitcher for the Dutch national baseball team at the Baseball World Cup in Havana, Cuba, 1973.
