= Västervik =

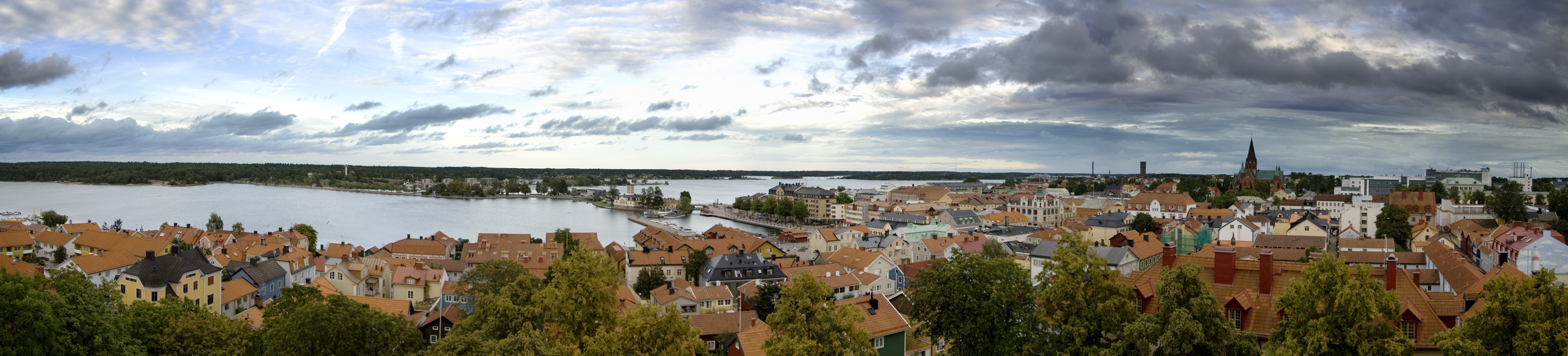
- A panorama of Västervik from the roof of St. Gertruds Church.

- Location within Kalmar Location within Sweden
- Coordinates: 57°45′N 16°38′E
- Country: Sweden
- Province: Småland
- County: Kalmar County
- Municipality: Västervik Municipality

Area
  - Total: 12.92 km^{2} (4.99 sq mi)
- Elevation: 6 m (20 ft)

Population (31 December 2021)
  - Total: 36,747
  - Density: 1,637/km^{2} (4,240/sq mi)
- Time zone: UTC+1 (CET)
  - Summer (DST): UTC+2 (CEST)
- Postal code: 593 80
- Area code: (+46) 49
- Climate: Cfb
- Website: www.vastervik.se

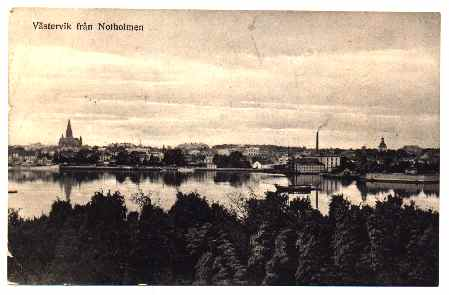
Västervik around 1900

Västervik is a city and the seat of Västervik Municipality, Kalmar County, Sweden, with 36,747 inhabitants in 2021. Västervik is one of three coastal towns with a notable population size in the province of Småland.

== Climate ==
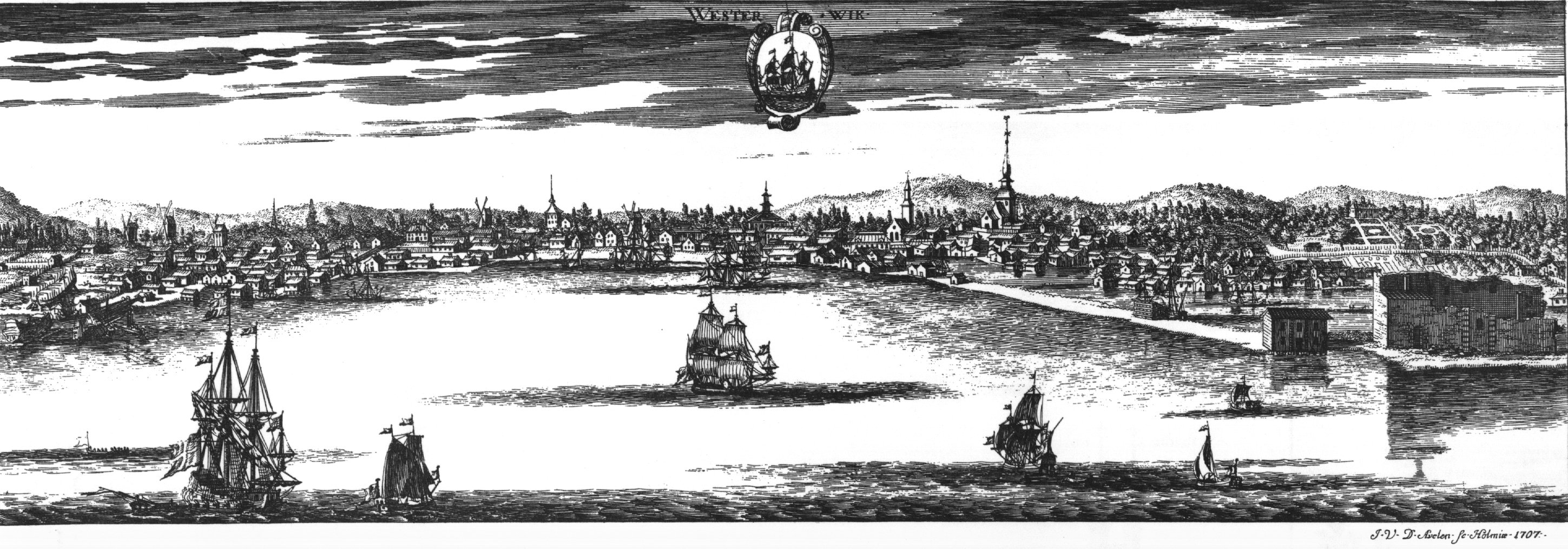
Västervik in Suecia Antiqua et Hodierna

Västervik has a semi-continental type of the oceanic climate (Cfb) using the -3 °C isotherm, and a true humid continental climate (Dfb) using the 0 °C isotherm, with vast differences between seasons. The major weather station in the area is in Gladhammar 10 kilometres (6.2 mi) west of Västervik. Differences are likely to be minor, with precipitation normals being available in greater detail for Västervik's station. Overnight lows may be the biggest difference, due Västervik's coastal position.

Climate data for Gladhammar 2002-2016 for temperatures; Västervik 1961-1990 for precipitation
Month	Jan	Feb	Mar	Apr	May	Jun	Jul	Aug	Sep	Oct	Nov	Dec	Year
Record high °C (°F)	12.1 (53.8)	16.5 (61.7)	21.8 (71.2)	26.8 (80.2)	29.0 (84.2)	33.2 (91.8)	34.0 (93.2)	33.6 (92.5)	28.3 (82.9)	24.0 (75.2)	15.4 (59.7)	13.6 (56.5)	34.0 (93.2)
Mean daily maximum °C (°F)	1.2 (34.2)	2.2 (36.0)	5.8 (42.4)	11.7 (53.1)	16.6 (61.9)	20.6 (69.1)	23.3 (73.9)	22.1 (71.8)	18.3 (64.9)	11.2 (52.2)	6.4 (43.5)	3.0 (37.4)	11.9 (53.4)
Daily mean °C (°F)	−1.5 (29.3)	−0.9 (30.4)	1.6 (34.9)	6.2 (43.2)	10.9 (51.6)	14.8 (58.6)	17.8 (64.0)	16.8 (62.2)	13.3 (55.9)	7.5 (45.5)	3.7 (38.7)	0.4 (32.7)	7.6 (45.7)
Mean daily minimum °C (°F)	−4.1 (24.6)	−4.0 (24.8)	−2.6 (27.3)	0.7 (33.3)	5.1 (41.2)	9.0 (48.2)	12.3 (54.1)	11.4 (52.5)	8.2 (46.8)	3.8 (38.8)	1.0 (33.8)	−2.2 (28.0)	3.2 (37.8)
Record low °C (°F)	−31.4 (−24.5)	−33.1 (−27.6)	−26.5 (−15.7)	−15.3 (4.5)	−4.5 (23.9)	−0.1 (31.8)	4.5 (40.1)	2.1 (35.8)	−4.0 (24.8)	−10.2 (13.6)	−13.8 (7.2)	−25.8 (−14.4)	−33.1 (−27.6)
Average precipitation mm (inches)	42.0 (1.65)	30.7 (1.21)	32.4 (1.28)	36.0 (1.42)	43.3 (1.70)	45.1 (1.78)	67.6 (2.66)	49.4 (1.94)	59.9 (2.36)	45.9 (1.81)	53.1 (2.09)	50.8 (2.00)	559.5 (22.03)
Source 1: SMHI
Source 2: SMHI Monthly Data 2002-2015

== Economy ==
The city still bases much of its industry on its harbour, and on the industries that were established as a result of it in the late 19th century. Västervik has suffered the closure of certain factories, notably Electrolux, with associated job losses. Just outside Västervik, there is the static inverter of HVDC Gotland and Fårhultsmasten, a 335 m-tall (1,099 ft) guyed mast used for FM/TV-transmission, which shares with three other masts the title of Sweden's tallest structure.

== Culture ==
Every year since 1966 there is a folk music festival in Västervik, at the ruins of the Stegeholm castle. The area has artistic talent by artists, potters, craft people and painters.

== Sport and recreation ==
Being a summer town popular with yachtspeople, campers, daytrippers, and returning former residents, Västervik experiences an annual revival in July.

Västervik offers an outdoor life of climbing, canoeing and sailing or islands to visit and stay at. Björn Ulvaeus, a member of the internationally successful pop group ABBA who grew up in Västervik, is building a complex consisting of hotel, restaurant, and apartments in the bay near Stegeholm castle, which will be a tourist attraction for Västervik.

On the north western outskirts on the Stora Infartsvägen road, there is a speedway stadium known as the Ljungheden, where the Västervik Speedway team compete.

== Other uses ==
Västervik is also the name of a small village 8 km north of Vaasa, Finland. The name just means "western bay", so there could be more minor localities by that name.

== People ==
- Ellen Key, author and feminist
- Gottfrid Emanuel Lundberg, Swedish-American engraver
- Björn Ulvaeus, one of the four members of the pop group ABBA
- Alice Babs, singer
- John F. Carlson, Swedish-born American Impressionist artist
- Stefan Edberg, tennis player
- Ulf Grenander, statistician, probabilist, and computer scientist.
- Gösta Bernhard, actor and film director
- Magnus Härenstam, comedian, actor and TV host
- Hansi Schwarz, musician, band member of Hootenanny Singers, manager of the annual music festival in Västervik
- Ola Källenius, chairman of the Board of Management of Daimler AG, and head of Mercedes-Benz Cars in Stuttgart, Germany
- Carl Rosenblad, racing driver
- Yngve Holm, sailor, 1920 Olympic gold medalist
- Pehr Olsson, Swedish statesman and Speaker of the Riksdag
- Erik Bladstrom, canoer and Olympian
- Sven Johannson, canoer and Olympian

== See also ==
- Västerviks gymnasium
- Västervik Speedway, motorcycle speedway club
