= Bojan Savnik =

Bojan Savnik (24 October 1914 – May 1984) was a Yugoslav canoeist who competed in the late 1930s. He finished 11th in the folding K-2 10000 m event at the 1936 Summer Olympics in Berlin. He was born in Laibach, Austria-Hungary.
