= Pehr Olsson =

Swedish farmer, statesman and politician

- Herre; Peder Hakesson Olufsson
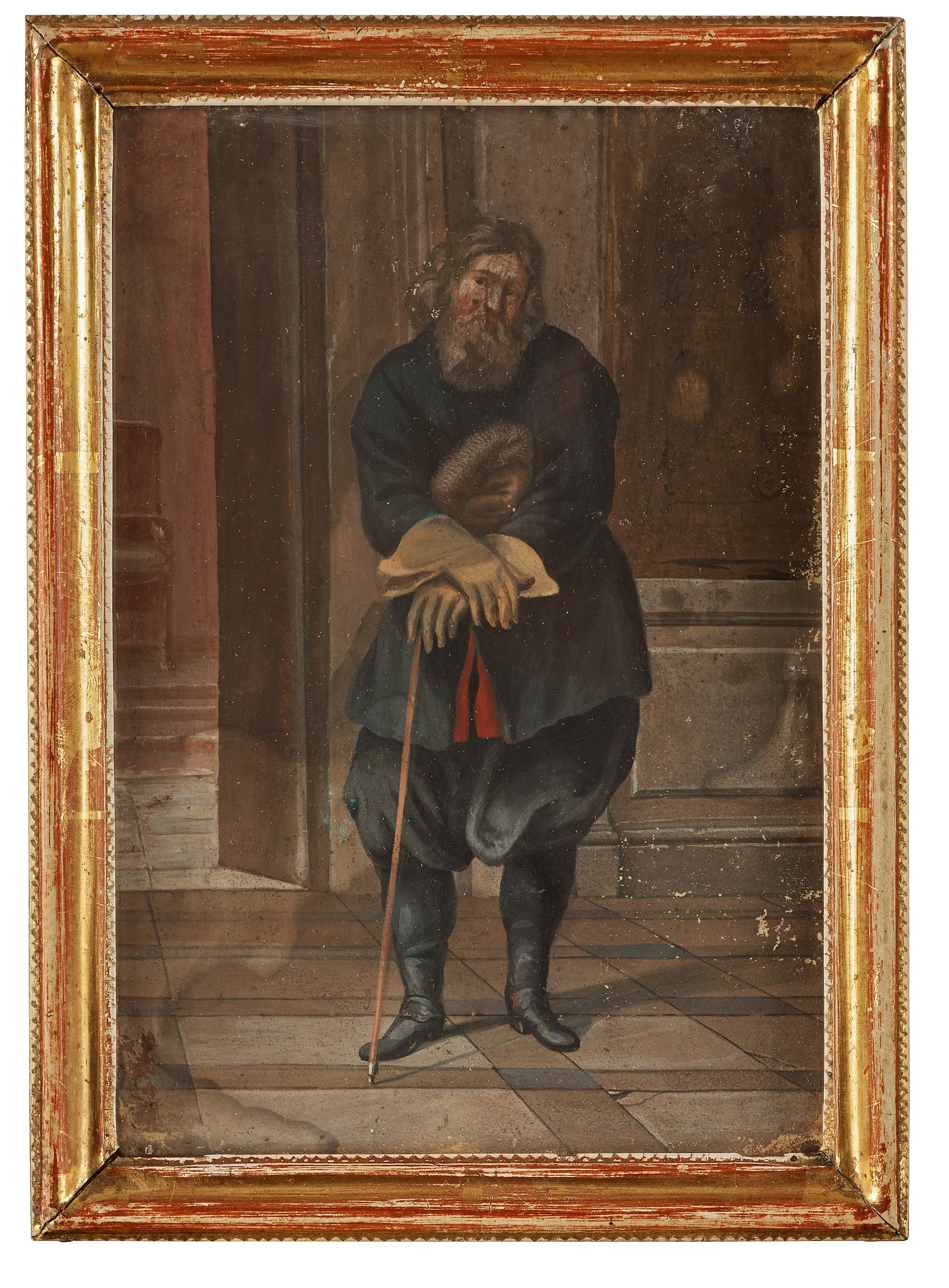
- Olsson, c. 56

State-holder of Gladhammar and Lund By (Note: Olsson was the owner and state-holder of Gladhammar and Lund By through Royal decree)
- Reign: 1686 - 14 December 1692
- Royal decree: December 1686
- Predecessor: Title Established
- Heir apparent: Olof Pehrsson

Speaker of the Riksdag
- In office 10 September 1686 – 14 December 1692
- Monarch: Charles XI
- Preceded by: Olof Tyreson
- Succeeded by: Anders Svensson

Member of the Riksdag of Estate for Västervik Chairman of the Agricultural Committee
- In office 17 December 1676 – 14 December 1692
- Monarch: Charles XI
- Prime Minister: Magnus Gabriel De la Gardie (1676-1680); Bengt Gabrielsson Oxenstierna (1680-1692)
- Preceded by: District Established
- Succeeded by: District Abolished

Chief Councillor of the Lord Marshal Minister Secretary
- In office 2 October 1682 – 10 September 1682
- Monarch: Charles XI
- Preceded by: Position Established
- Succeeded by: Position Abolished
- Born: 1630; Småland, Sweden
- Spouse: See list
- Issue: See list
- Pehr Håkansson Olsson i Gladhammar
- House: Suneätten
- Father: Olof Hake
- Mother: Kerstin

Pehr Olsson, (Note: The National Archives of Sweden have noted his name as Pehr Olsson but contemporary church documents use the Danish spelling Peder Olufsson and Peter Olofsson) sometimes Peder Olofsson, or Peter Olufsson (Swedish pronunciation: [/pˈɛxr ˈɔlɔfssɔn/]; c. 1630 - 14 December 1692) was a Swedish farmer and parliamentarian who served as Speaker of the Riksdag of Estate from 1686 to 1692. He is most known for his role in the Great Reduction.

== Early life ==
Pehr Olsson was born in early 1630 in Gladshammar, Småland, to Olof Håkansson, a farmer with an unknown date of birth, but who died on 31 October 1661 in Lund, Sweden, and Kerstin Hake. He was the grandson of parliamentarian Håkan Olofsson, and great-grandson of Olof Lövingsson Mörk of Skatelöv.

== Career ==
In 1675, Olsson was selected as an independent candidate for the Västervik election district by popular support. In the 1676 General Election of Sweden, he won the election with a majority vote. In 1678, he was once again elected into office with a sizeable margin.

Olsson was involved in parliamentary sessions considered to be important in modernising Sweden. In 1680, he drove the legislature into reduction and relinquish of power, and declared Charles XI to:

"henceforth be responsible only to God alone"

— Pehr Olsson’s speech during the Parliament Session, 1680

Olsson also oversaw the 1682 legislation that granted Charles XI legislative authority over the Riksdag of Estate.

As a result of his loyal servitude to the monarch, at the parliamentary session of 1682, after being re-elected for his third consecutive term, Olsson was promoted to Speaker of the Riksdag of Estate. This appointed was a significant recognition of King Charles XI trust in Pehr Olsson, who was at the time the longest serving parliamentarian of the Fourth Estate. During the 1686 parliamentary session, several decisions were made, including the 1686 Church Law. After the session, Charles XI gifted Gladhammar and Lunds by to Olsson as an act of gratitude.

In 1686, Olsson was selected as godfather to Prince Carl Gustaf and lead the baptism ceremony. After the baptism ceremony, he was presented by King Charles XI with one hundred ducats and a large silver tankard, from which he drank to the prosperity of the royal house, expressing, in his simple language yet with great warmth and heartfelt eloquence, the wishes of his fellow estate members for the beloved king and his noble heirs.

"On behalf of the Peasant Estate, Pehr Olsson, a man of the parliament, he earned the honor, with grace to spare, to witness the prince’s baptism event. He knew how to conduct himself well, to speak and to toast with skill and flair, on behalf of all the common folk there."

— Count Erik Lindschöld, Address to the Palace Court, 1690

Queen Dowager Hedwig Eleonora, impressed by his dignified appearance and the honesty and steadfastness of soul that characterized the honorable yeoman's entire being, had Ehrenstrahl paint his portrait, which was placed in Stockholm Palace.

The portrait made by David Klöcker Ehrenstrahl, and commissioned by Queen Dowager Hedwig Eleonora, is today displayed on Gripsholm Castle as part of the National Portrait Gallery of Sweden.

As an additional royal favor, his farm, Lund, was exempted from taxes and levies for the duration of his and his wife's lifetime. In the National Archives, it is stated that this distinguished and honored farmer died on December 14, 1692, and is buried in Gladhammar churchyard.

== Personal life ==
Pehr Olsson was married to an unknown woman named Kerstin. Their first child, Ingrid Pehrsson, was stillborn in 1655; their second child, Brita, was born 28 September 1656 and lived to 5 November 1737. On 28 December 1659, Olsson remarried with Elin Olofsdotter. Their first child, Ingeborg Pehrsson, was born on 1 November 1660; Kristina on 2 July 1665; Anna on 1 January 1670. On 23 March 1673 the couples last child, Olof Pehrsson, was born. Later that year, Pehr Olsson is said to have begun his political engagement.
