= Alliance of Builders of Kongo =

Political party in the Democratic Republic of the Congo

Alliance of Builders of Kongo (French, Alliance des Bâtisseurs du Kongo) is a Congolese political party. It uses ABAKO as an intentional abbreviation for the party's name to pay homage to the former ABAKO party of the 1950s and 1960s.

The party won three National Assembly seats in the 2006 general election.
