= Piet Wijdekop =

Dutch sprint canoeist

Personal information
- Full name: Pieter Wijdekop
- Born: 13 September 1912 Amsterdam, Netherlands
- Died: 1 September 1982 (aged 69) Heemskerk, Netherlands

Sport
- Sport: Kayaking
- Event: Folding kayak
Medal record
Men's canoe sprint
Representing Netherlands
Olympic Games
| Bronze medal – third place | 1936 Berlin | Folding K-2 10000 m |

Pieter Wijdekop (13 September 1912 – 1 September 1982), known as "Piet", was a Dutch sprint canoeist who competed in the late 1930s. He won a bronze medal in the folding K-2 10000 m event with his younger brother Kees at the 1936 Summer Olympics in Berlin.

The Wijdekop brothers were born in Amsterdam, where they were members of the canoe club De Plassers. In their honor, an international marathon canoe race up and down between Amsterdam and Purmerend, organized yearly until 2008, was named the Gebroeders Wijdekop Race. Piet died in Heemskerk in 1982.
