= Sven Johansson (canoeist) =

Swedish canoeist (1912–1953)

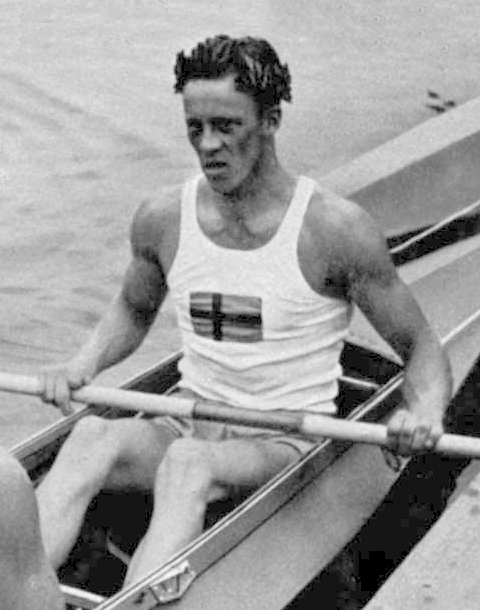
- Johansson at the 1936 Olympics

Personal information
- Nationality: Swedish
- Born: 10 June 1912 Västervik, Sweden
- Died: 5 August 1953 (aged 41)

Sport
- Country: Sweden
- Sport: Canoe racing
- Event: Folding K-2 10000 m
- Club: Westerviks KK, Västervik

Achievements and titles
- Olympic finals: 1936 Berlin
Medal record
Representing Sweden
Olympic Games
Gold medal – first place	1936 Berlin	Folding K-2 10000 m
World Championships
Silver medal – second place	1938 Vaxholm	K-2 10000 m folding

Sven Bertil Johansson (10 June 1912 – 5 August 1953) was a Swedish sprint canoeist who won a gold medal in the folding K-2 10000 m event at the 1936 Summer Olympics in Berlin. He also won a silver medal in the same event at the 1938 ICF Canoe Sprint World Championships in Vaxholm.
