= Västerviks gymnasium =

Coordinates: 57°44′55.26″N 16°38′7.53″E

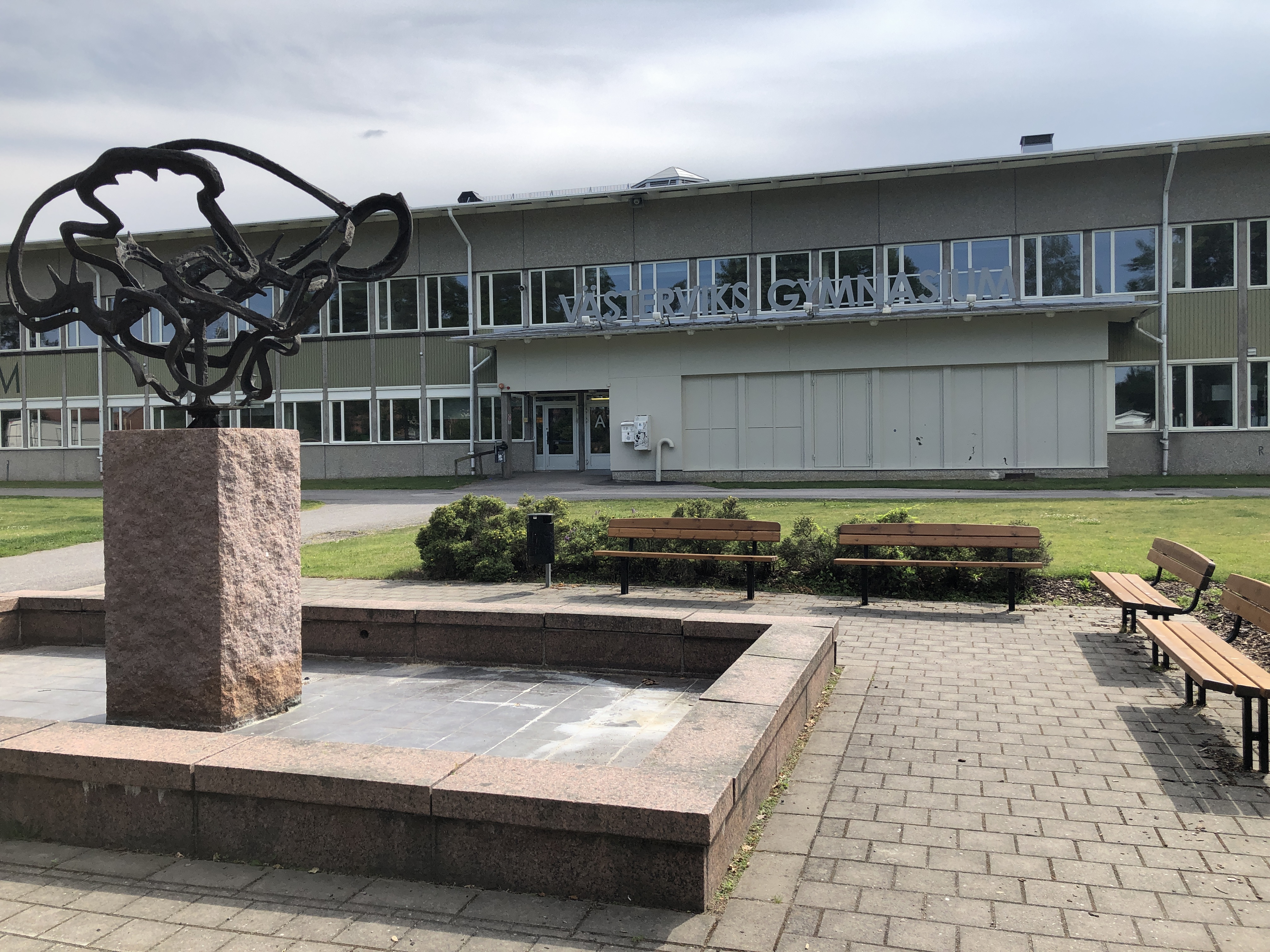
Västerviks gymnasium campus

Västerviks gymnasium is a gymnasium in Västervik, Sweden. The school offers courses in nature science, social studies, economy, music, dance, drama, entrepreneuring, energy, and various sports. There are around 1600 students currently studying at the school.
