= Armand Pagnoulle =

Belgian canoeist

Armand Philippe Hubert Julien Pagnoulle (2 May 1901 – 9 April 1996) was a Belgian canoeist who competed in the 1936 Summer Olympics.

In 1936, he and his partner Charles Pasquier finished eighth in the folding K-2 10000 m event. He founded the RBKC (Royal Brussel Kayak Club).

Pagnoulle was born in Verviers on 2 May 1901. He died in Grez-Doiceau on 9 April 1996 at the age of 94.

He was the father of Roland Pagnoulle (1932 - 2026) founder of "Plasti-Nautic", a company based in Corbais which was designing touring and racing kayaks.
