= André Zimmer =

Luxembourgish canoeist

André Zimmer (19 September 1912 – 13 December 1984) was a Luxembourgish sprint canoeist, born in Longlaville, France, who competed in the late 1930s. He finished 13th in the folding K-2 10000 m event at the 1936 Summer Olympics in Berlin.
