= Tibor Poór =

Hungarian canoeist

Tibor Poór (born 19 November 1914; date of death unknown) was a Hungarian canoeist who competed in the late 1930s. He finished 12th in the folding K-2 10000 m event at the 1936 Summer Olympics in Berlin.
