= István Kolnai =

Hungarian canoeist

István Kolnai (born 26 September 1911; date of death unknown) was a Hungarian canoeist who competed in the late 1930s. He finished 12th in the folding K-2 10000 m event at the 1936 Summer Olympics in Berlin.
