= Léopoldville riots =

1959 riots in the Belgian Congo

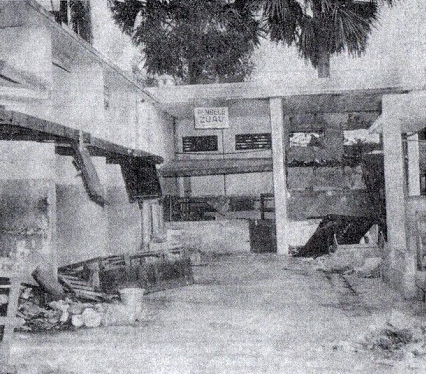
Damage to the Congolese Public Market in Léopoldville from the riots

The Léopoldville riots were an outbreak of civil disorder in Léopoldville (modern-day Kinshasa) in the Belgian Congo which took place in January 1959 and which were an important moment for the Congolese independence movement. The rioting occurred when members of the Alliance des Bakongo (ABAKO) political party were not allowed to assemble for a protest and colonial authorities reacted harshly. The exact death toll is not known, but at least 49 people were killed and total casualties may have been as high as 500. Following these riots, a round table conference was organized in Brussels to negotiate the terms of Congo's independence, The Congo received its independence on 30 June 1960, becoming the Republic of the Congo.

== Background ==
Colonial rule in the Congo began in the late 19th century. King Leopold II of the Belgians, frustrated by Belgium's lack of international power and prestige, attempted to persuade the Belgian government to support colonial expansion around the largely unexplored Congo Basin. The Belgian government's ambivalence about the idea led Leopold to eventually create the colony on his own account. With support from a number of Western countries, who viewed Leopold as a useful buffer between rival colonial powers, Leopold achieved international recognition for a personal colony, the Congo Free State, in 1885. By the turn of the century, however, the violence of Free State officials against indigenous Congolese and the ruthless system of economic extraction had led to intense diplomatic pressure on Belgium to take official control of the country, which it did in 1908, creating the Belgian Congo.

During the latter stages of World War II a new social stratum emerged in the Congo, known as the évolués. Forming an African middle class in the colony, they held skilled positions (such as clerks and nurses) made available by the economic boom. While there were no universal criteria for determining évolué status, it was generally accepted that one would have "a good knowledge of French, adhere to Christianity, and have some form of post-primary education." Up into the 1950s most évolués were concerned only with social inequalities and their treatment by the Belgians. Nationalism grew in 1958 as more évolués began interacting with others outside of their own locales and started discussing the future structures of a post-colonial Congolese state. A slew of new political parties competed for popular support, including the Alliance des Bakongo (ABAKO), led by Joseph Kasa-Vubu and the Mouvement National Congolais (MNC), led by Patrice Lumumba. The Belgian colonial administration attempted to put in motion a plan for decolonization but wanted more time to build up a Congolese administration and prepare for their exit, so they attempted to isolate the country from Africa and Europe and suppress political organization. This became increasingly difficult as Congolese nationalism became more popular, so in July 1958 the Belgian government established a study group to consider new reforms in the colony. In response to the study group's findings, the colonial administration decided it would announce constitutional changes in the Congo on 13 January 1959.

On 28 December 1958, Lumumba organized a major MNC rally in Léopoldville where he reported on his attendance of the All-African Peoples' Conference in Accra, Ghana, earlier that month. Noting the success of the rally, Kasa-Vubu decided to organize his own event one week later, on Sunday January 4, 1959 to discuss African nationalism. ABAKO requested permission to hold the meeting at Léopoldville's YMCA (Young Men's Christian Association) building, but the municipal government, having been given short notice, communicated that only a "private meeting" would be authorised. Belgian officials also warned that if the event became political, ABAKO leaders would be held responsible.

== Riots ==
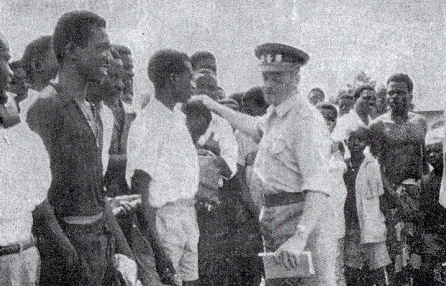
General Émile Janssens speaking with civilians in Léopoldville following the riots. Janssens was in charge of suppressing the unrest.

Interpreting the administration's warnings as a prohibition of the meeting, ABAKO leadership attempted on 3 January to postpone their event, but on Sunday, 4 January, a large crowd gathered at the YMCA anyway. Kasa-Vubu and other ABAKO officials arrived to send the protesters home. They were unable to calm the crowd, and the violence began following the protesters' refusal to disperse.

The crowd began throwing rocks at police and attacking white motorists. The initial group of protesters were soon joined by 20,000 Congolese leaving a nearby soccer stadium. At the time press accounts estimated that 35,000 Africans were involved in the violence, which quickly spread as the rioters attempted to enter the European section of the capital. Rioters allegedly smashed and looted storefronts, burned Catholic missions and beat Catholic priests. Many demonstrators chanted "indépendance immédiate".

Order was restored with the use of African police officers in the employ of the colonial government and with armored cars under the direction of General Émile Janssens. Colonial authorities arrested as many as 300 Congolese, including Kasa-Vubu, who would later become the newly independent Congo's first president, Simon Mzeza and ABAKO vice-president Daniel Kanza and charged them with inciting the riot.

== Aftermath ==
Estimates of the riot's final death toll vary, but estimates of total casualties range to as high as 500. The official casualties were tallied as 49 Africans killed and 241 wounded. Many Africans did not seek treatment at hospitals and many of those that died were inconspicuously buried. The January riots marked a turning point in the Congolese liberation movement, forcing colonial and Belgian authorities to acknowledge that serious issues existed in the colony. Unlike earlier expressions of discontent, the grievances were conveyed primarily by uneducated urban residents, not évolués. Many évolués, like the Europeans, were perturbed by the destruction.

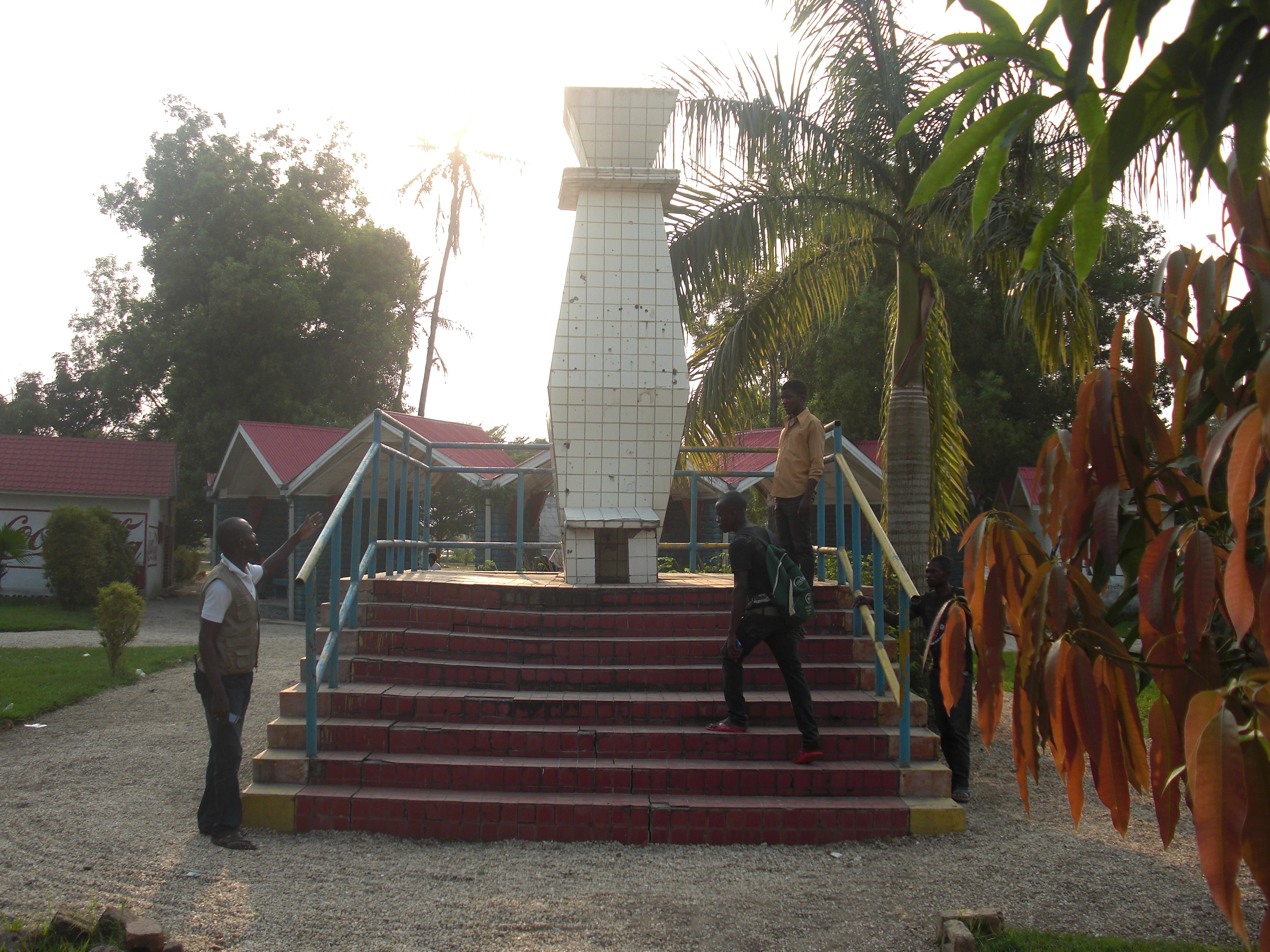
The Place du 4 Janvier in Kisangani is one of the Congo's public spaces which take their name from the Léopoldville riots

In the immediate aftermath, Belgian authorities laid blame on unemployed Africans, but claimed the majority of the city's 250,000 African residents were not involved. The Belgian Parliament established a commission of inquiry to investigate the cause of the riots. The commission found the disturbances to be the culmination of discontent with racial discrimination, overcrowding, and unemployment. It also concluded that external political events, such as France's decision to grant self-governance to the neighboring French Congo, to be a contributing factor, and criticized the colonial administration's response to the riot. On 13 January the administration went forward with its scheduled announcement of reforms, including new local elections in December, the institution of a new civil service employment status that made no racial distinctions, and the appointment of more Africans to advisory bodies. The Belgian King, Baudouin, also declared for the first time that independence would be granted to the Congo in the future. International media assumed that the reforms were made in response to the riots. There is no evidence to support this, though it is possible that Baudouin's declaration was made to temper Congolese opinion.

== Legacy ==
4 January is now celebrated as a public holiday in the Democratic Republic of the Congo, known as Day of the Martyrs. The events marked the radicalization of the independence movement and are often considered to be the "death knell" for Belgian control of the Congo. This radicalization occurred on both sides, with a Congolese group signalling a willingness to use violence to achieve independence for the first time as well as many in the white community also becoming increasingly prepared for violence. Some whites planned to attempt a coup d'état if a black majority government took power.

The riots also marked a period of rising tension and a break for the MNC, the main political rivals for the ABAKO. Starting with the unrest in January, both of the nationalist parties' influence expanded outside the major cities for the first time, and nationalist demonstrations and riots became a regular occurrence over the next year, bringing large numbers of black people from outside the évolué class into the independence movement. With the bulk of the ABAKO leadership was arrested, the MNC was left in an advantageous political position.

== See also ==
- List of massacres in the Democratic Republic of the Congo

== Notes and references ==
=== Bibliography ===
- "Joseph Kasavubu Dies in Congo; Was His Nation's First President" (PDF). The New York Times. 24 March 1969.
- "Congolese win independence from the Belgian Empire, 1959-60". Swarthmore College - Global Action Nonviolent Database.
- Gibbs, David N. (1991). The Political Economy of Third World Intervention: Mines, Money, and U.S. Policy in the Congo Crisis. American Politics and Political Economy. Chicago: University of Chicago Press. ISBN 9780226290713.
- Gilroy, Harry (8 January 1959a). "Belgium Lays Riot To Congo Jobless". The New York Times.
- Gilroy, Harry (9 March 1959b). "Belgians Absolve 3 Congo Leaders" (PDF). The New York Times.
- Hoskyns, Catherine (1965). The Congo Since Independence: January 1960 – December 1961. London: Oxford University Press. OCLC 414961.
- "Order Restored In Congo Capital After Riots Fatal to 34 Africans" (PDF). The New York Times. 6 January 1959.
- "Congo Policy Drafted" (PDF). The New York Times. 11 January 1959a.
- "Unrest Spreads in Belgian Congo" (PDF). The New York Times. 2 November 1959b.
- Zeilig, Leo (2008). Lumumba: Africa's Lost Leader. London: Haus. ISBN 978-1-905791-02-6.
- Nzongola-Ntalaja, Georges (2002). From Leopold to Kabila: A People's History. Zed Books. ISBN 1842770535.
- Young, Crawford (1965). Politics in the Congo: Decolonization and Independence. Princeton: Princeton University Press. OCLC 307971.
