= Metod Gabršček =

Yugoslav canoeist (1900–1942)

Metod Gaberšček (27 March 1900 – 18 January 1942) was a Yugoslav canoeist who competed in the late 1930s. He was born in Gorizia.

Gaberšček finished 11th in the folding K-2 10000 m event at the 1936 Summer Olympics.

Gaberšček died on 18 January 1942 in Ljubljana as a result of WWII.
