= Emil Bottlang =

Swiss canoeist (1912–1995)

Emil Bottlang (23 December 1912 – 14 December 1995) was a Swiss canoeist who competed from the late 1930s to the late 1940s. Competing in two Summer Olympics, he earned his best finish of sixth in the folding K-2 10000 m event at Berlin in 1936. Bottlang died on 14 December 1995, at the age of 82.

== Sources ==
- Sports-reference.com profile
