= Charles Pasquier =

Belgian canoeist

Charles Simon Pasquier (Brussels, 3 June 1914, date of death unknown) was a Belgian canoeist who competed in the 1936 Summer Olympics. He was born in Brussels. In 1936 he and his partner Armand Pagnoulle finished eighth in the folding K-2 10000 m event.
