= Émile Janssens =

Belgian colonial general

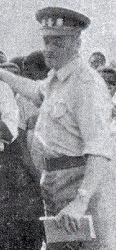
- General Janssens speaking to Congolese civilians following riots in Léopoldville, 1959
- Born: 15 June 1902; Schaerbeek, Brussels, Belgium
- Died: 4 December 1989 (aged 87); Brussels, Belgium
- Military career
- Allegiance: Belgian Congo
- Branch: Force Publique
- Service years: 1939–1960
- Rank: Lieutenant-general
- Commands: Force Publique (March 1954–1960)
- Other work: Historian, politician

Émile Robert Alphonse Hippolyte Janssens (15 June 1902 – 4 December 1989) was a Belgian military officer and colonial official, best known for his command of the Force Publique at the start of the Congo Crisis. He described himself as the "Little Maniac" (French: Petit Maniaque) and was a staunch disciplinarian, but his refusal to see Congolese independence as marking a change in the nature of his command has been cited as the immediate cause of the mutiny by the Force Publique in July 1960 that plunged Congo-Léopoldville into chaos and anarchy.

== Background ==
Émile Janssens served in various military roles during World War II. He served in Abyssinia, Nigeria, the Middle East, France, Holland and Belgium. After the war, he taught at the Royal Military Academy in Brussels. In 1952, he was promoted to the rank of colonel and made responsible for the major military camp at Kamina.

On 1 February 1954, Janssens was given command of the Force Publique, the gendarmerie of the Belgian Congo which also acted as the colony's armed forces. He took over from Auguste Gilliaert who had commanded it since World War II. Since its creation, the entire Force Publique was tightly segregated along racial lines and, despite being majority black, was commanded entirely by white officers. In 1958, Janssens was further promoted to the rank of Lieutenant-General.

The period of Janssens' command of the Force Publique coincided with the expansion of the African nationalist movement in the Congo. In 1959, he was responsible for repressing an important wave of riots in Léopoldville led by the Alliance des Bakongo (Note: In most Bantu languages, the prefix ba- is added to a human noun to form a plural. As such, Bakongo refers collectively to members of the Kongo ethnic group.) (ABAKO) party.

== 1960 Mutiny ==
"As I have always told you, order and discipline will be maintained as they have always been. Independence brings changes to politicians and to civilians. But for you, nothing will be changed...none of your new masters can change the structure of an army which, throughout its history, has been the most organized, the most victorious in Africa. The politicians have lied to you."

— Speech to Force Publique soldiers on 5 July 1960

With the independence of Congo-Léopoldville on 30 June 1960, Janssens remained in charge of the Force Publique. During the final years of colonial rule, he had firmly opposed initiatives to allow black soldiers into the traditionally white officer corps of the Force Publique. Immediately prior to independence there were still no commissioned black officers in the Force, although about twenty Congolese officer cadets had commenced training at military academies in Belgium. This attitude caused unrest among the black troops under his command, already unsettled by the stress of keeping order during the independence celebrations and seeing themselves as excluded from the benefits of independence. Janssens was determined that the social order created under the Belgian colonial rule would continue even in the new independent state.

He called a meeting of the NCOs of the Léopoldville garrison on 5 July 1960, just six days after independence, where he wrote on a blackboard, "Before independence = After independence" and gave an accompanying speech in which he argued that independence did not change anything for the army.

The message infuriated the soldiers under his command, who within hours mutinied and attacked European residents in the Congo. The mutiny, beginning at Camp Hardy near Thysville, prompted an exodus of fleeing Europeans in the country towards Brazzaville and Stanleyville where the Belgians deployed paratroopers to rescue their citizens.

Some have seen the rebellion as a result of Janssens' inflexible mindset. Others suspected that he was deliberately trying to incite a rebellion. Regardless, in the aftermath of the mutiny, Janssens resigned from his post, also resulting from differences with the government of Patrice Lumumba.

Janssaens was replaced by Victor Lundula, who had been hastily promoted to General from the rank of Sergeant-Major. In the aftermath of the mutiny, the Force Publique was dissolved and replaced by the Armée Nationale Congolaise (ANC).

== Later life ==
Janssens returned to Belgium, via the French Congo. Returning to Brussels, and professing to be retired, he publicly approached a statue of King Leopold II, the founder of the Congo Free State (the antecedent of the Belgian Congo), then bowed his head and announced "Sire, they've made a pig's ear of it" ("Sire, ils vous l'ont cochonné"). The comment was widely reported and, because it appeared to criticize politicians and their decision to grant independence to the colony, it became a popular slogan for Belgian pro-colonialist groups. In his later years he wrote widely on his experience of the Congo Crisis and of Congolese history of the colonial period in general. He is particularly noted for his 1979 work on the history of the Force Publique.

In 1964, Janssens unsuccessfully stood as lead candidate for the minor far-right Parti national (National Party) party in the local elections. The party was closely associated with the neocolonialist Amitiés Belgo-Katangaises movement which supported the secession of the Katanga from the Congo. From 1983 to 1989, he served as head of the Belgian nationalist organization Pro Belgica.

== In popular culture ==
- In the 2000 film Lumumba, directed by Raoul Peck, Janssens was played by Rudi Delhem.

== See also ==
- Auguste Gilliaert, commander of the Force Publique before Janssens
- Belgian Congo in World War II
