= Erik Bladström =

Swedish canoeist (1918–1998)

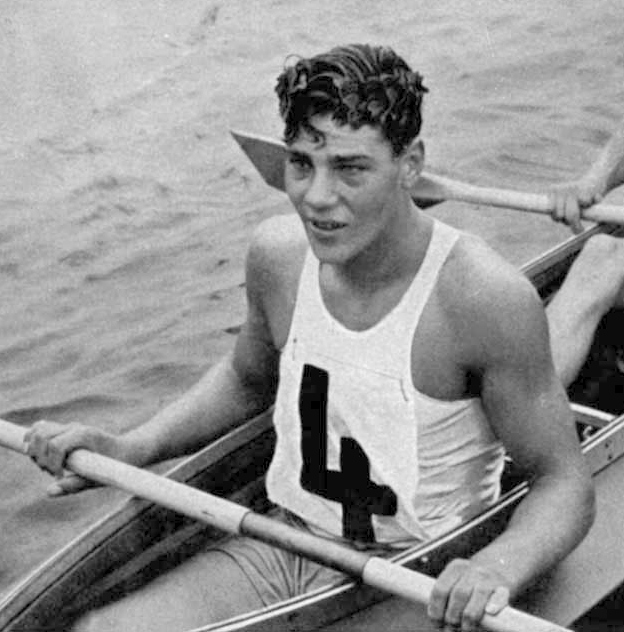
- Bladström at the 1936 Olympics

Personal information
- Born: 29 March 1918 Västervik, Sweden
- Died: 21 May 1998 (aged 80) Västervik, Sweden

Sport
- Sport: Canoe racing
- Club: Westerviks KK, Västervik
Medal record
Representing Sweden
Olympic Games
Gold medal – first place	1936 Berlin	Folding K-2 10000 m
World Championships
Silver medal – second place	1938 Vaxholm	K-2 10000 m folding

Bror Erik Alvar Bladström (29 March 1918 – 21 May 1998) was a Swedish sprint canoeist who competed in the late 1930s. He won a gold medal in the folding K-2 10000 m event at the 1936 Summer Olympics, where he was the youngest competitor, aged 18.

Bladström also won a silver medal in the same event at the 1938 ICF Canoe Sprint World Championships in Vaxholm.
