= Canoeing at the 1936 Summer Olympics – Men's folding K-2 10000 metres =

These are the results of the men's folding K-2 10000 metres competition in canoeing at the 1936 Summer Olympics. The K-2 event is raced by two-man canoe sprint folding kayaks. The race took place on Friday, August 7.

Twenty-six canoeists from 13 nations competed. The 1936 Games was the only time that the folding K-2 10000 metres was including in the canoeing competition.

== Medalists ==
Gold	Silver	Bronze
Erik Bladström and Sven Johansson (SWE)	Erich Hanisch and Willi Horn (GER)	Piet Wijdekop and Kees Wijdekop (NED)

== Final ==
Friday, August 7, 1936: Only a final was held.

Place	Canoeists	Time
1	Sven Johansson and Erik Bladström (SWE)	45:48.9
2	Willi Horn and Erich Hanisch (GER)	45:49.2
3	Kees Wijdekop and Piet Wijdekop (NED)	46:12.4
4	Adolf Kainz and Alfons Dorfner (AUT)	46:26.1
5	Otakar Kouba and Ludvík Klíma (TCH)	47:46.2
6	Eugen Knoblauch and Emil Bottlang (SUI)	47:54.4
7	John Lysak and James O'Rourke (USA)	49:46.0
8	Armand Pagnoulle and Charles Pasquier (BEL)	49:57.1
9	Alex Brearley and John Dudderidge (GBR)	50:12.0
10	Stanley Potter and Frank Willis (CAN)	50:31.9
11	Metod Gabršček and Bojan Savnik (YUG)	50:36.4
12	István Kolnai and Tibor Poór (HUN)	50:46.4
13	André Zimmer and Jean Strauss (LUX)	50:47.1
