= John Lysak =

American canoeist (1914–2020)

Personal information
- Full name: John J. Lysak
- Born: August 16, 1914; Bound Brook, New Jersey, U.S.
- Died: January 8, 2020 (aged 105); Fremont, California, U.S.
- Occupation: Athlete
- Spouse: June Lysak (m. ????–2001; her death)

John J. Lysak (August 16, 1914 – January 8, 2020) was an American canoeist who competed in the Olympic Games in 1936 in Berlin. Born in New Jersey but raised in an orphanage in New York, he competed in the 1936 Olympics in Men's Folding Kayak Doubles, 10 kilometres, finishing seventh. After a stint in the United States Marine Corps during World War II, Lysak attended Springfield College and worked as a painting contractor until the age of 62.

== Early life ==
Lysak was born in Bound Brook, New Jersey, on August 16, 1914. His brother, Steven Lysak, was a gold and silver medal-winning canoeist at the 1948 Summer Olympics in London. When John was four years old, his mother died in the 1918 flu pandemic, and his father was forced to send his two sisters to live with relatives in New York. The Lysak brothers, however, were sent to an orphanage in New Jersey for two years, before being transferred to Yonkers, New York.

In their spare time, the duo constructed homemade boats along the Hudson River using tar paper and barrel staves. They soon joined a local rowing club after their talent caught the attention of the members. There John met James O'Rourke, who was to become his partner at the 1936 Summer Olympics.

== Olympic career ==
On their journey to Berlin, Lysak and O'Rourke destroyed much of the equipment in the ship's gymnasium and were prohibited from entering it for most of the trip. Lysak competed with O'Rourke in Men's Folding Kayak Doubles, 10 kilometres, on a lake just outside the capital city. The duo did not win a medal, placing seventh in the competition.

While observing some of the athletic events, he claims to have witnessed Adolf Hitler refusing to congratulate or shake the hand of Jesse Owens. On the return journey to the United States, Lysak encountered Owens and inquired about the incident. According to Lysak, Owens responded that "that kind of thing had been going on his whole life. He'd gotten used to it." After the Games, Lysak never returned to Europe.

== Later life ==
Lysak returned to the United States and graduated from Springfield College in Massachusetts, where he met his wife, June. He served as a United States Marine during World War II in the South Pacific. After the war, Lysak moved to California to work as a painting contractor, until he retired at the age of 62. His wife, with whom he had two sons, died in 2001. Lysak was able to kayak until 2002 and was reported to be in fair health in 2008, at which point he was living in Fremont, California, with his two sons. At the time he was reported to be the San Francisco Bay Area's oldest living former Olympian, although he did not display any memorabilia from the Games in his house.
