= Ollie Savatsky =

American football player (1911–1989)

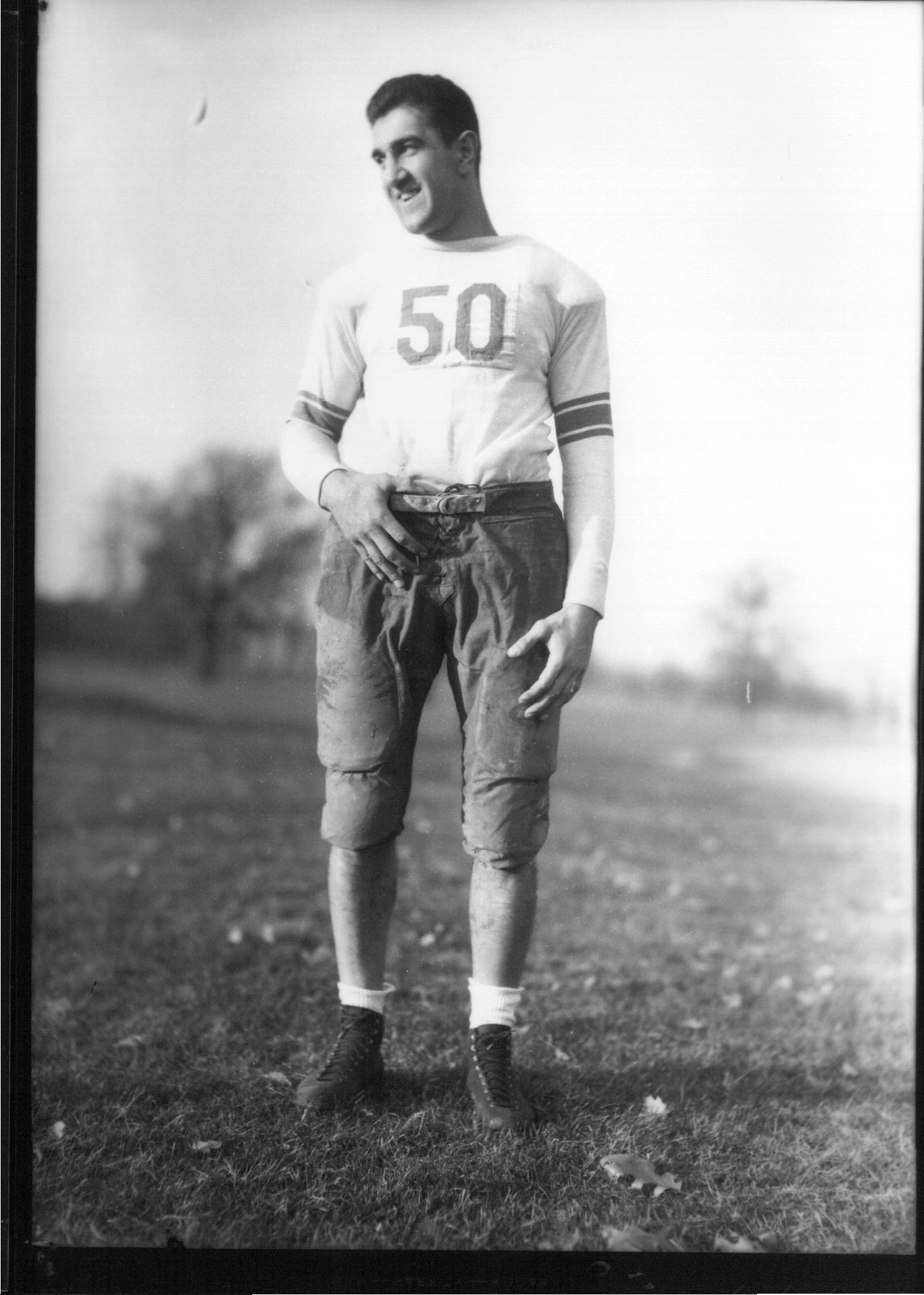
- Savatsky in 1932

No. 35
- Position: End

Personal information
- Born: May 13, 1911; Cleveland, Ohio, U.S.
- Died: December 24, 1989 (aged 78); Cleveland, Ohio, U.S.
- Listed height: 6 ft 2 in (1.88 m)
- Listed weight: 215 lb (98 kg)

Career information
- High school: Lincoln (Cleveland)
- College: Miami (OH)

Career history
- Brooklyn Dodgers (1935)*; Cleveland Rams (1937); Rochester Tigers (1937)
- * Offseason or practice squad member only
- Stats at Pro Football Reference

Oliver John Savatsky (May 13, 1911 – December 24, 1989) was an American professional football end who played one season with the Cleveland Rams of the National Football League (NFL). He played college football at Miami University.

== Early life and college ==
Oliver John Savatsky was born on May 13, 1911, in Cleveland, Ohio. He first enrolled at Cathedral Latin High School in Cleveland before transferring to Lincoln High School in Cleveland.

Savatsky was a member of the Miami Redskins of Miami University from 1931 to 1934. He was a three-year letterman from 1932 to 1934. He earned unanimous first-team All-Ohio and All-Buckeye Conference honors.

== Professional career ==
Savatsky signed with the Brooklyn Dodgers of the National Football League (NFL) in 1935. However, he was later released.

Savatsky played in one game for the Cleveland Rams of the NFL during the team's inaugural 1937 season. He stood 6'2" and weighed 215 pounds.

Savatsky also played in five games, starting one, for the Rochester Tigers of the American Football League in 1937 and scored one receiving touchdown. He wore jersey number 35 while with the Tigers.

== Personal life ==
Oliver changed his last name to Sawyer after his football career. His last name has also been spelled "Savotsky". He died on December 24, 1989, in Cleveland.
