= James O'Rourke Jr. =

American canoeist (born 1942)

James O'Rourke Jr. (born May 6, 1942 in Yonkers, New York) is an American sprint canoeist who competed in the mid-1960s. He was eliminated in the semifinals of the C-2 1000 m event at the 1964 Summer Olympics in Tokyo.

O'Rourke's father, James Sr., competed for the United States as a canoeist at the 1936 Summer Olympics in Berlin.
