= ABAKO =

Bakongo Association for the Unification, Conservation and Development of the Kongo Language Association Bakongo pour l'unification, la conservation et le développement de la langue Kongo
- Abbreviation: ABAKO
- President: Joseph Kasa-Vubu
- Founded: 1950
- Dissolved: 1966
- Headquarters: Leopoldville, Congo-Leopoldville
- Newspaper: Kongo dia Ngunga; Kongo Dieto; Notre Kongo
- Ideology: Congolese nationalism Conservatism; Bakongo interests Anti-imperialism; Tribalism
- Religion: Christianity (Kimbanguism)
- Colours: Yellow

The Bakongo Association for the Unification, Conservation and Development of the Kongo Language (French: Association Bakongo pour l'unification, la conservation et le développement de la langue Kongo, ABAKO) was a Congolese political party founded in 1950 by Edmond Nzeza Nlandu in Léopoldville. It subsequently came to be headed by Joseph Kasa-Vubu, and emerged in the late 1950s as a vocal opponent of Belgian colonial rule in what is today the Democratic Republic of the Congo. In addition to its political role, ABAKO served as the principal ethno-religious organisation for the Kongo people (also known as Bakongo) and became closely intertwined with the Kimbanguist Church, which was extremely popular in the Lower Congo region.

== Background and origins ==
Because of its long exposure to the West and its rich heritage of messianic unrest, the lower Congo region—homeland of the Kongo people—was the first area to emerge as a focal point of militantly anti-Belgian sentiment and political activity. Originally conceived as a cultural and linguistic association to promote and preserve the Kikongo language, ABAKO was transformed under Kasa-Vubu's leadership, which began in 1954–55, into an explicitly political organisation demanding immediate independence.

== The 1956 manifesto and the independence movement ==
ABAKO and Kasa-Vubu spearheaded ethnic nationalism in the lower Congo, and in 1956 issued a manifesto calling for immediate independence. The move came in direct response to a far more conciliatory statement by a group of intellectuals from other ethnic groups connected to the editorial committee of the Léopoldville newspaper Conscience Africaine ("African Consciousness"). That group had given its full endorsement to the proposals set forth by Belgian professor A. A. J. Van Bilsen in his 1955 essay, the Thirty-Year Plan for the Political Emancipation of Belgian Africa—commonly known as the Van Bilsen Plan—which called for a gradual transition to independence over thirty years.

Far more impatient in tone and radical in its objectives, the ABAKO counter-manifesto rejected this extended transition, asserting: "Rather than postponing emancipation for another thirty years, we should be granted self-government today." In so doing, ABAKO melded ethnic nationalism with ideas about territorial nationalism for the colony as a whole, laying the groundwork for a more broadly anti-colonial movement.

== Political dominance in Léopoldville ==
The transformation of ABAKO into a major vehicle of anti-colonial sentiment unleashed considerable unrest throughout the lower Congo region. In the capital city of Léopoldville (present-day Kinshasa), the party emerged as the dominant political force: in the municipal elections of December 1957, ABAKO candidates won 133 out of 170 seats on the communal council, giving the party effective control of the African communes. This victory greatly strengthened the party's bargaining position relative to the colonial administration. In the countryside, meanwhile, local ABAKO sections proliferated rapidly, creating a de facto power structure that lay almost entirely beyond the control of colonial civil servants.

== The January 1959 riots and Belgian response ==
The turning point came on 4 January 1959, when Belgian administrators dispersed a large crowd of ABAKO supporters who had gathered in Léopoldville to attend a political meeting. ABAKO had sought permission to hold the gathering at the city's YMCA building; when colonial officials denied the meeting and the crowd assembled anyway, authorities intervened forcibly. The resulting widespread rioting brought extensive plunder of European-owned property. When order was finally restored, at the price of an exceedingly brutal repression, the official casualty figures stood at 49 Congolese killed and 241 wounded, though some estimates placed total casualties considerably higher. Colonial authorities arrested several ABAKO leaders, including Kasa-Vubu, Daniel Kanza, and Simon Nzeza Nlandu, charging them with incitement to riot.

A week after the riots, on 13 January 1959, the Belgian government formally recognised independence as the ultimate goal of its colonial policies. King Baudouin I announced: "It is our firm intention, without undue procrastination, but without fatal haste, to lead the Congolese forward to independence in prosperity and peace." Although no precise date was set, the tide of nationalist sentiment could not be stemmed, and the Belgian Congo formally attained independence on 30 June 1960.

== Ethnic nationalism and political competition ==
ABAKO's anti-Belgian orientation notwithstanding, the party was first and foremost an ethnic movement of the Kongo people. Its emphasis on the past splendours of the pre-colonial Kingdom of Kongo and the cultural value of the Kikongo language aligned with its proclaimed objective of reconstructing the Kongo polity; at one point the party advocated outright secession as the most direct means of achieving this goal.

Whilst ABAKO militancy inspired other groups of Africans to emulate its demands for immediate independence, a further consequence was the structuring of political competition along ethnic lines. In Léopoldville, the ethnic Kongo elements soon came into conflict with groups of Lingala-speaking people from the interior, and in 1959–60 this rivalry became a major point of contention between the forces of ethno-regionalism and the claims of territorial nationalism.

The party never exhibited a systematic political programme beyond demanding immediate independence and, eventually, the establishment of a federal Congolese state in which each ethnic region would enjoy substantial autonomy.

== After independence ==
Following independence, members of ABAKO held prominent roles in the new Congolese state. Joseph Kasa-Vubu became the country's first president, serving from 1960 to 1965. Daniel Kanza, the vice-president of ABAKO, became the first non-white mayor of Kinshasa (1960–62). His son, Thomas Kanza—among the very first Congolese nationals to receive a university education—was appointed by Prime Minister Patrice Lumumba as the Republic of the Congo's first delegate to the United Nations (1960–62) and subsequently served as chargé d'affaires to the United Kingdom (1962–64).

== Dissolution ==
ABAKO was dissolved in 1966 when Joseph-Désiré Mobutu, following his coup of November 1965, established an authoritarian single-party state under his Popular Movement of the Revolution (MPR). All other political parties were banned, bringing ABAKO's existence to an end.

== Legacy ==
A small political party in the modern-day Democratic Republic of the Congo, the Alliance of Builders of Kongo (French: Alliance des Bâtisseurs du Kongo), uses the acronym ABAKO as a homage to the original party's legacy. It won three seats in the National Assembly at the 2006 general election and two seats at the 2011 election.
