= Veli Leskinen =

Finnish footballer

Personal information
- Date of birth: 5 May 1907
- Date of death: 31 December 1989 (aged 82)
- Position: Defender

International career
Years	Team	Apps	(Gls)
1932–1943	Finland	20	(0)

Veli Leskinen (5 May 1907 – 31 December 1989) was a Finnish footballer. He played in twenty matches for the Finland national football team from 1932 to 1943. He was also part of Finland's squad for the football tournament at the 1936 Summer Olympics, but he did not play in any matches.
