= Gustave de Galard =

French painter and designer

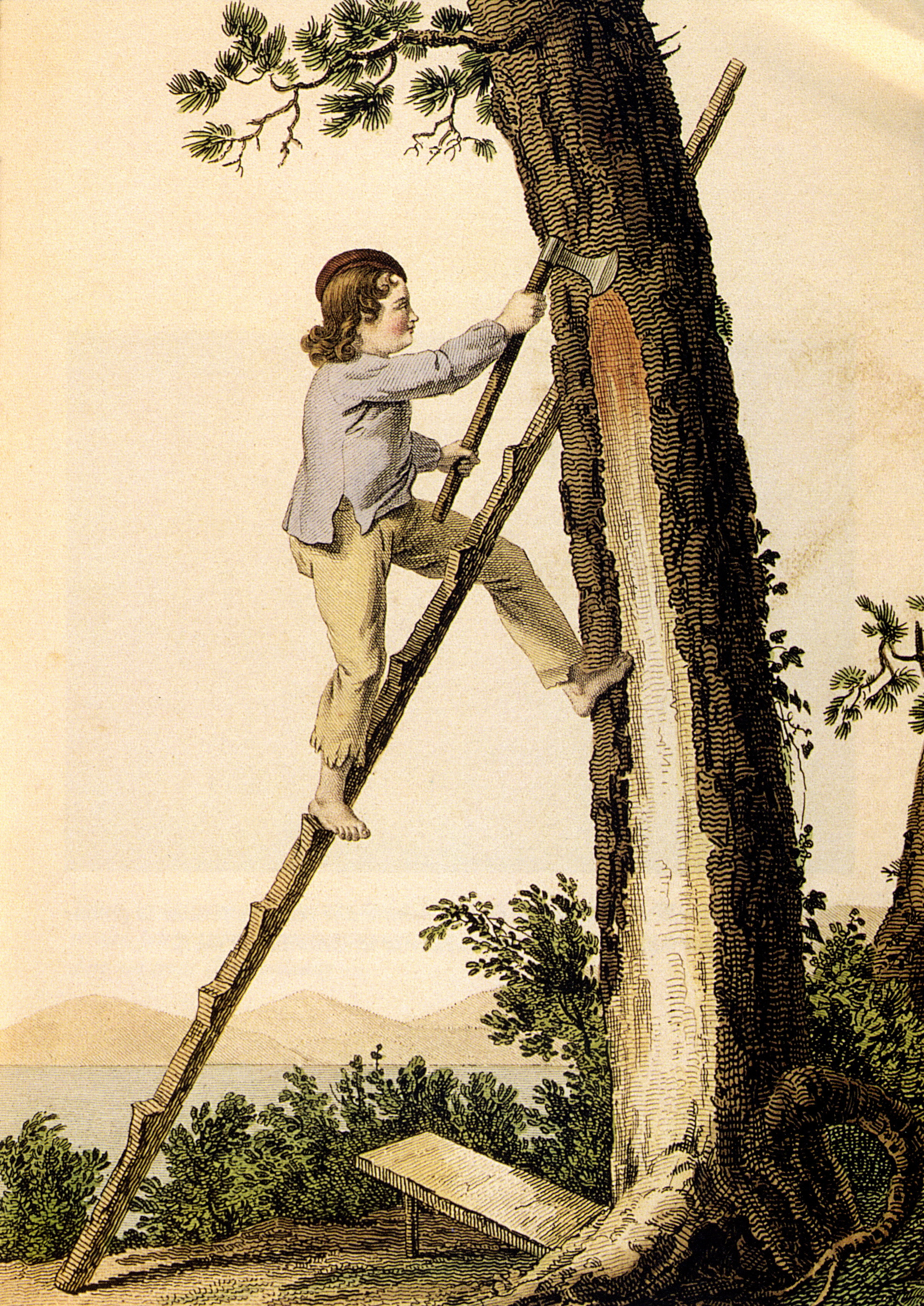
Resin extraction, coloured engraving from 1818 by Gustave de Galard

Count Gustave de Galard was a French painter and designer, born to the de Galard family at the château of L'Isle-Bouzon, near Lectoure, about 1777, and died at Bordeaux in 1840. In the Bordeaux Museum there is by him a View at La Teste. His son, Georges de Galard, was born at Bordeaux, and died there in 1834, and there is in the Museum of that city a Study of a Sweep, by him.
