= Jean Strauss =

Luxembourgish sprint canoeist

Jean Strauss (17 February 1912 – 18 December 1989) was a Luxembourgish sprint canoeist who competed in the late 1930s. He finished 13th in the folding K-2 10000 m event at the 1936 Summer Olympics in Berlin.
