= Daniel Kanza =

Congolese politician

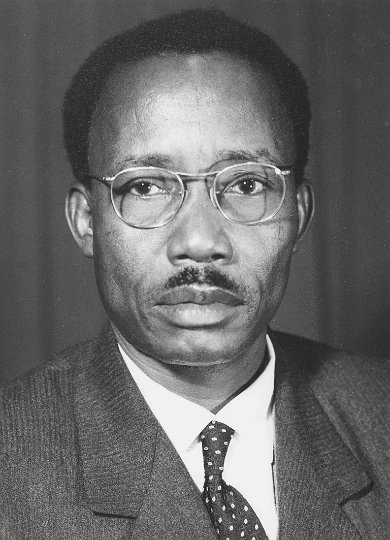
- Kanza in 1960

Premier Burgomaster of Léopoldville
- In office October 1960 – June 1962

Personal details
- Born: 1909 Manianga, Luozi Territory, Belgian Congo
- Died: 1990 (aged 80–81)
- Party: Alliance des Bakongo (?–1960); Alliance des Congolais (1960–)
- Spouse: Élisabeth Mansangaza
- Children: 7

Military service
- Allegiance: Congo
- Branch/service: Force Publique
- Rank: Sergeant

Daniel Kanza Kinsona (1909–1990) was a Congolese politician and a leading member of the Alliance des Bakongo. He served as Premier Burgomaster of the capital of the Congo, Léopoldville, from 1960 until 1962. He later served in the National Assembly.

== Biography ==
Daniel Kanza was born in 1909 in the Manianga area of the Luozi Territory. He received a Protestant Christian education before enlisting in the Force Publique, being stationed all over the Congo. He reached the rank of sergeant. After his service he became a Protestant deacon. Between 1929 and 1940 Kanza had seven children with Élisabeth Mansangaza, including future sociologist and politician Sophie Kanza and future politician and diplomat Thomas Kanza. He worked as a functionary in the colonial administration. In 1957 he became vice president of the Alliance des Bakongo (ABAKO) party. He was arrested after the Léopoldville riots of 4 January 1959.

Kanza attended the Belgo-Congolese Round Table Conference in Brussels on behalf of ABAKO in January 1960, and was chosen to be a vice president of the talks. He heavily criticized party president Joseph Kasa-Vubu for his attitude during the conference and his failure to consult other party members. Kasa-Vubu also pushed for a federalist government, which Kanza strongly opposed in favor of a unitary system. He and two of his sons published a series of articles in a Congolese newspaper they ran that accused Kasa-Vubu of collaborating with France to divide the Congo. After Kasa-Vubu walked out of the conference, Kanza attempted to assume leadership over the party but most members remained loyal to Kasa-Vubu. During the conference questions were raised over whether Belgium should retain any powers or official responsibilities in the Congo after 30 June. Kanza was appointed to a committee formed to address the problem, and ultimately it was decided that the Congolese state should assume all responsibilities of governance.

Kanza was expelled from ABAKO on 1 February. On 4 March, he announced the formation of a dissident wing of the party, which became known as ABAKO-Kanza. This later transformed into the Alliance des Congolais (ALCO). Most of Kanza's support came from the Manianga area of the Luozi Territory. The Manianga Council, a regional association, unsuccessfully attempted to reconcile him and Kasa-Vubu. In October he was elected Premier Burgomaster of Léopoldville. The following year he dismissed all European members of the city council. Kanza left office in June 1962 when ABAKO had him removed and replaced by a candidate they preferred. In January 1965 a group of Maniangans nominated him as candidate for national senator in anticipation of upcoming elections. However, the Lower Congo provincial governor demanded personal loyalty from all local candidates. Kanza refused to pledge such, and as a result was not included on the ballot for ABAKO. Yet by 1972 he was serving in the National Assembly. He died in 1990.
