= Ludvík Klíma =

Czechoslovak sprint canoeist (1912–1973)

Medal record

Men's canoe sprint

World Championships
Bronze medal – third place	1948 London	K-4 1000 m

Ludvík Klíma (27 June 1912 – 19 May 1973) was a Czechoslovak sprint canoeist who competed in the late 1930s and late 1940s. He won a bronze medal in the K-4 1000 m event at the 1948 ICF Canoe Sprint World Championships in London.

Klíma also competed in two Summer Olympics, earning his best finish of fifth in the folding K-2 10000 m event at Berlin in 1936. He was born and died in Prague.
