= Willi Horn =

German canoeist

Personal information
- Born: January 17, 1909 Berlin
- Died: May 31, 1989 (aged 80)

Sport
- Sport: Kayaking
- Event: Folding kayak
Medal record
Men's canoe sprint
Representing Germany
Olympic Games
Silver medal – second place	1936 Berlin	Folding K-2 10000 m

Willi Horn (January 17, 1909 – May 31, 1989) was a German sprint canoeist, born in Berlin, who competed in the late 1930s. At the 1936 Summer Olympics in Berlin, he won a silver medal in the folding K-2 10000 m event.
