= Geneviève de Galard =

French nurse (1925–2024)

Geneviève de Galard-Terraube
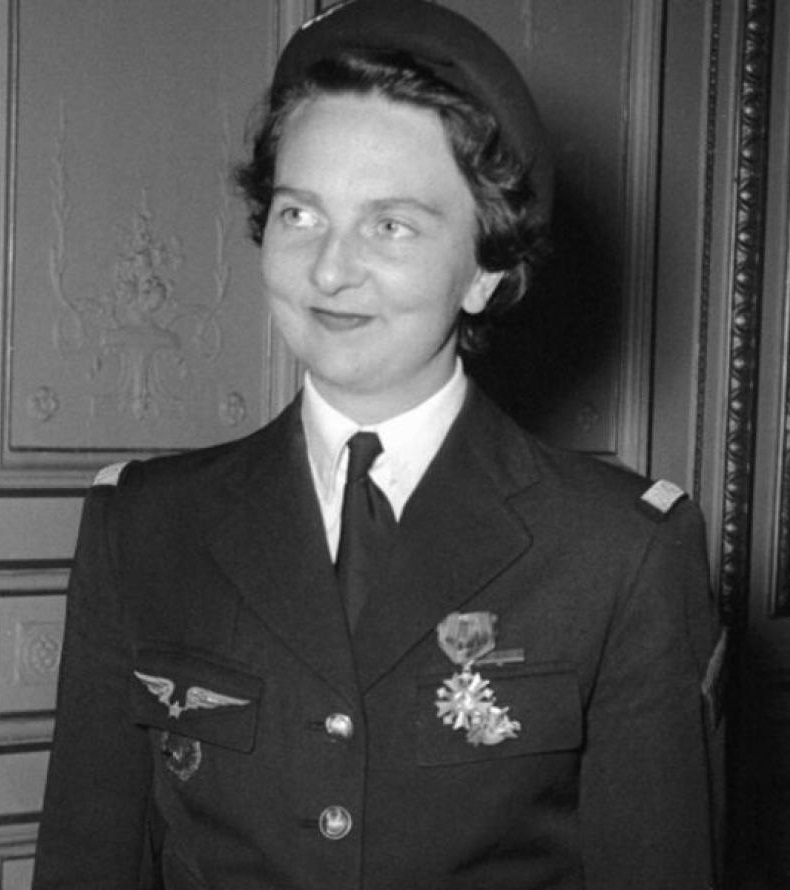
- Geneviève de Galard, "The Angel of Diên Biên Phu".
- Nickname: The Angel of Dien Bien Phu
- Born: Geneviève Marie Anne Marthe de Galard Terraube; 13 April 1925; Paris, France
- Died: 30 May 2024 (aged 99) Toulouse
- Allegiance: France
- Branch: Air Force
- Conflicts: Indochina War
- Awards: Croix de guerre des théâtres d'opérations extérieures Ordre national du Mérite; Florence Nightingale Medal; Medal of Freedom; Grand-croix de la Légion d'honneur

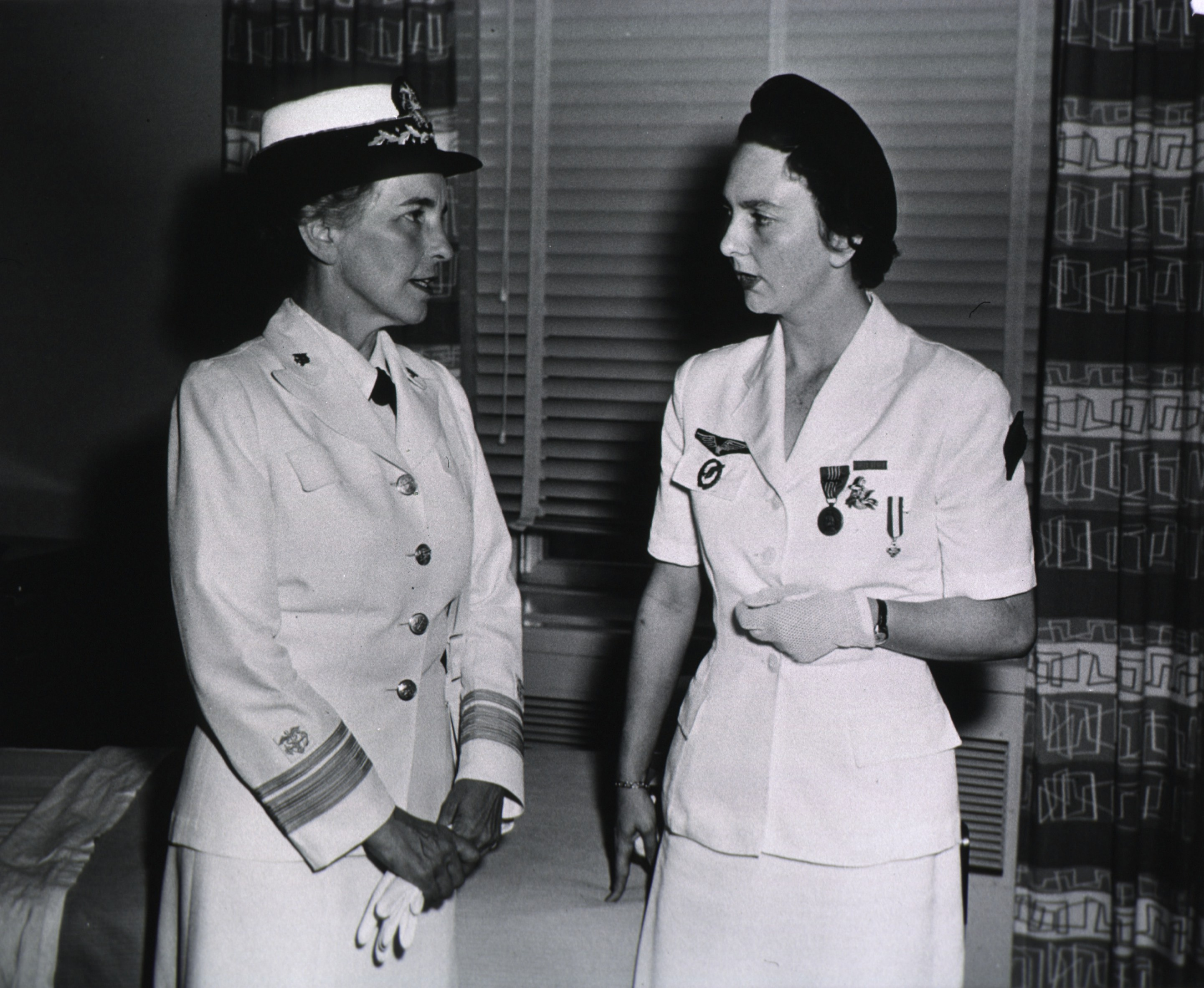
Lt. Geneviève de Galard-Terraube (right) with Lucile Petry in 1954

Geneviève de Galard (13 April 1925 – 30 May 2024) was a French nurse who was dubbed l'ange de Dien Bien Phu ("the Angel of Dien Bien Phu") during the French war in Indochina by the press in Hanoi, although in the camp she was known simply as Geneviève.

== Early life ==
Geneviève de Galard grew up in the southwest of France, a member of the noble De Galard family. The Second World War forced her family to move from Paris to Toulouse.

Galard passed the state exam to become a nurse and eventually became a flight nurse for the French Air Force. She was posted to French Indochina by her own request and arrived there in May 1953, in the middle of the war between French forces and the Viet Minh.

Serving as a convoyeuse or in-flight nurse, she was stationed in Hanoi and flew on casualty evacuation flights from Pleiku. After January 1954, she was on the flights that evacuated casualties from the Battle of Dien Bien Phu. Her first patients were mainly soldiers who suffered from diseases but after mid-March most of them were battle casualties. Sometimes, Red Cross planes had to land in the midst of Vietminh artillery barrages.

== Dien Bien Phu ==
Galard found herself stuck in Dien Bien Phu on 28 March 1954, when the C-47 on which she was the convoyeuse landed in fog and damaged an oil tank which prevented its taking off again. The mechanics could not repair the plane in the field, so the plane was stranded. At daylight Vietminh artillery destroyed the C-47 and damaged the runway beyond repair.

Volunteering to work in the field hospital, Galard was the only female nurse at Dien Bien Phu. Her special status earned her a small parachute silk-lined cell with a cot and chair for a bedroom. In a letter, her mother expressed gratitude for her safety, mentioning that there was no longer a risk of her plane crashing. At the hospital she served under Dr. Paul Grauwin. The men of the medical staff were initially apprehensive about her presence as she was not just the only female nurse on the base, but the sole French woman there, although there were two Bordels Mobiles de Campagne (Mobile Field Brothels) populated with Algerian and Vietnamese prostitutes. Her hard work and willingness to tackle even the most gruesome tasks eventually won them over and they made accommodations for her. They also arranged a semblance of a uniform: camouflage overalls, trousers, basketball shoes, and a T-shirt. Galard did her best in very unsanitary conditions, comforting those about to die and trying to keep up morale in the face of the mounting casualties. Many of the men later complimented her efforts. Eventually, she was placed in charge of a forty-bed room for housing some of the most gravely wounded.

=== Légion d´honneur ===
On 29 April 1954, Galard was awarded the Légion d´honneur (as a knight) and the Croix de Guerre TOE (Croix de guerre des théâtres d'opérations extérieurs (War Cross for foreign operational theaters)). It was presented to her by the commander of Dien Bien Phu, General de Castries. The following day, during the celebration of the French Foreign Legion's annual "Camerone" Day, de Galard was made an honorary Légionnaire de 1ère classe alongside Lieutenant Colonel Marcel Bigeard, the commander of the 6th Colonial Parachute Battalion. After the induction ceremony she told her Foreign Legionnaire sponsor: "If we ever get out of this alive, I'll pay you a bottle of champagne no matter where we meet." In 1963 while driving with her husband in Paris she saw the Legionnaire, got out of her car, embraced him and made good on her promise.

French troops at Dien Bien Phu finally capitulated on 7 May. However, the Vietminh allowed Galard and the medical staff to continue to care for their wounded and she worked changing bandages despite short supplies. Galard still refused any kind of cooperation. When some of the Vietminh began to hoard medical supplies for their own use, she hid some of them under her stretcher bed.

=== Release ===
On 24 May, Galard was evacuated to French-held Hanoi, partially against her will. She was the first of the medical staff to leave and quickly became a media sensation, appearing on the cover of Paris Match that week.

As early as 19 May, when Galard was still in captivity, U.S. Congresswoman Frances P. Bolton urged United States Secretary of State John Foster Dulles to invite the French nurse to the United States. When she arrived in New York City in July, she was met at the plane by Mayor Robert Wagner and a large crowd. Congresswoman Bolton introduced her as a "symbol of heroic femininity in the free world" and a Ticker Tape parade down Broadway in her honor was attended by perhaps 250,000 spectators. She was then given a reception at city hall.

Having flown to Washington, D.C., on a U.S. Air Force plane, she was recognized before the House of Representatives. On 29 July 1954, President Dwight D. Eisenhower awarded her the Medal of Freedom during a ceremony in the White House Rose Garden, calling her the "woman of the year" She was then sent on a tour of six states where she met with luminaries and appeared before large crowds in cities such as Cleveland, Chicago, New Orleans, and San Francisco. The French ambassador to the United States called her visit "an exceptional success".

== Later life and death ==
Galard lived in Paris with her husband, Colonel Jean de Heaulme de Boutsocq. She died in Toulouse on 30 May 2024, at the age of 99.

== Published works ==
- De Galard, Geneviève (2013). Angel of Dien Bien Phu: The Lone French Woman at the Decisive Battle for Vietnam. Annapolis: Naval Institute Press. p. 296. ISBN 978-1-61251-386-7. OCLC 1044731073.

== Bibliography ==
- Fall, Bernard B. (2002) [1966]. Hell in a Very Small Place: The Siege of Dien Bien Phu. New York: Da Capo Press. p. 515. ISBN 978-0-306-81157-9. OCLC 50278296.
- Fall, Bernard B. (2005) [1964]. Street Without Joy: The French Debacle in Indochina. Stackpole Military History Series. Mechanicsburg, Pennsylvania: Stackpole Books. p. 408. ISBN 978-0-8117-3236-9. OCLC 60371335.
- Grauwin, Paul (2015) [1955]. Doctor at Dien-Bien-Phu. London: Normanby Press. p. 293. ISBN 978-1-78625-685-0. OCLC 933587376.
- Morgan, Ted (2010). Valley of Death: The Tragedy at Dien Bien Phu That Led America into the Vietnam War. New York: Random House Publishing Group. p. 722. ISBN 978-1-58836-980-2. OCLC 869497657.
- Windrow, Martin (2006). The Last Valley: Dien Bien Phu and the French Defeat in Vietnam. Cambridge, Massachusetts: Da Capo Press. p. 752. ISBN 978-1-78022-247-9. OCLC 1356478835.
- Windrow, Martin (2021). Dien Bien Phu 1954: The French Defeat that Lured America into Vietnam. Campaign 366. Oxford: Osprey Publishing. p. 96. ISBN 978-1-4728-4401-9. OCLC 1251443457.
- Time (31 May 1954). "Foreign News: Angel's Return". Time. ISSN 0040-781X.
