= James O'Rourke (canoeist) =

American canoeist

James Jerome O'Rourke (May 4, 1915 – November 21, 1983) was an American canoeist who competed in the 1936 Summer Olympics. He was born and died in Yonkers, New York. He was the father of James O'Rourke, Jr.

In 1936 he and his partner John Lysak finished seventh in the folding K-2 10000 m event.
