= Colin Mackay (writer) =

British poet

Colin Mackay (26 July 1951 – 26 or 28 July 2003) was a poet and novelist. His final work was an autobiography entitled Jacob's Ladder which included talking about his planned suicide.

== Books ==
- The Sound of the Sea (1990) ISBN 0-86241-154-8
- The Song of the Forest: A Fable of Magical Scotland (1986) ISBN 1-872988-56-3
- Cold Night Lullaby (1998) ISBN 0-906772-86-9
- House of Lies (1998) ISBN 1-872988-46-6
- Fires in the Night ISBN 1-84045-041-X
- Howling at the Moon ISBN 1-84045-104-1
