= Paul-Henri Grauwin =

Paul-Henri Grauwin (September 1, 1914 – December 30, 1989) was a medical doctor who served with the French Army. He most notably commanding the "Mobile Surgical Unit" during the prolonged Battle of Dien Bien Phu, after which he was taken prisoner and briefly held captive by the Viet Minh.

Of Flemish background, Grauwin served as a surgeon during the Second World War.

During the course of the First Indochina War, the French had established a base at Dien Bien Phu in late 1953. Grauwin, holding the rank of major, arrived in February 1954 to take charge of the 42-bed hospital unit there, conducting triage for evacuation and operating when necessary.

After the Viet Minh siege began in early March, Grauwin was kept busy with large numbers of casualties that flooded his surgical bunker. While the airstrip at the base was still in use, he evacuated many of the injured back to Hanoi. Grauwin soon found his facilities overwhelmed with casualties who had to be put in the halls. In one night, he and another surgeon amputated twenty-three limbs, plastered fifteen fractures, and repaired numerous other wounds: ten abdominal, ten chest, and two cranial. At other times, shelling killed those waiting for medical attention.

By the end of March Grauwin's hospital consisted of six shelters with 250 beds. Supplies dropped from the air included the contents of a United States field hospital with pyjamas, sheets, beds and vials of antibiotics. He also received two new aides: Private Fleury and Geneviève de Galard

In the last week of April, with the airstrip no longer usable, Grauwin's hospital contained more than one thousand wounded, and he had begun using some of the women from the base's brothels as medical orderlies.

By the end of the battle in May, Grauwin had more than 1,300 wounded in the makeshift wards of his hospital, and deprived by the shelling of electricity, was forced to operate by candlelight. With the fall of the base on 7 May, he was taken into captivity by the Viet Minh.

Grauwin remained in captivity until 1 June, when he and other French medical officers were exchanged for several hundred Vietnamese prisoners.

In 1954, Grauwin published a memoir entitled J'étais médecin à Diên Biên Phu, which was translated into English in 1955 with the title Doctor at Dien Bien Phu.

== Bibliography ==
- Morgan, Ted (2010). Valley of death : the tragedy at Dien Bien Phu that led America into the Vietnam War. New York: Random House. ISBN 978-1-4000-6664-3. OCLC 340961419.
