= De Galard family =

French noble family

de Galard de Galard de Béarn de Brassac
- Noble family
- Or three crows sable, beaked and membered gules.
- Country: France
- Origin: Gascony
- Founder: Garcie Arnaud

The de Galard family (French: Famille de Galard) is a family of the French nobility, still represented, originating from Condom in Gascony.

== Origin ==
According to J. Noulens, the Galard family takes its name from the seigneury of Galard or Goalard, the first barony of Condomois. It comes from the Counts of Condomois themselves from the Dukes of Gascony. The first known member of this family who took the name of Galard is Garcie Arnaud, baron de Galard, born around 995, who signed a charter on January 12, 1062 with Hugues and Hunald de Gabarret.

== Genealogy ==
The current branches and twigs of the de Galard family are:

Senior branch:

- de Galard Terraube
- de Galard L'Isle
- de Galard Magnas

Cadet branch:

- de Galard de Béarn
- de Galard de Brassac
- de Galard de Béarn de Brassac

== Personalities ==
- Gustave de Galard (1777–1840)
- René de Galard de Béarn (1699–1771)
- Geneviève de Galard (1925–2024), nurse

== Possessions ==
- Castle of Terraube
- Castle of Blanzaguet
- Castle of Miremont
