= Colin MacKay (footballer) =

Australian rules footballer, born 1908

Personal information
- Full name: Colin MacKay
- Born: 3 February 1908
- Died: 4 December 1989 (aged 81)

Playing career^{1}
Years	Club	Games (Goals)
1929	Fitzroy	4 (3)
- ^{1} Playing statistics correct to the end of 1929.

Colin MacKay (3 February 1908 – 4 December 1989) was an Australian rules footballer who played with Fitzroy in the Victorian Football League (VFL).
