= Deaths in July 1996 =

The following is a list of notable deaths in July 1996.

Entries for each day are listed alphabetically by surname. A typical entry lists information in the following sequence:

- Name, age, country of citizenship at birth, subsequent country of citizenship (if applicable), reason for notability, cause of death (if known), and reference.

== July 1996 ==
=== 1 ===
- William T. Cahill, 84, American politician.
- Harold Greenberg, 66, Canadian film producer.
- Margaux Hemingway, 42, American fashion model and actress, suicide.
- Einar Hovdhaugen, 88, Norwegian politician.
- Cláudio Kano, 30, Japanese Brazilian table tennis player and Olympian (1988, 1992), traffic collision.
- Lawrence Low, 75, American sailor and Olympic champion (1956).
- Alfred Marks, 75, British actor and comedian.
- Duke Maronic, 74, American gridiron football player (Philadelphia Eagles, New York Giants).
- Steve Tesich, 53, Serbian-American screenwriter (Breaking Away, The World According to Garp), Oscar winner (1980), heart attack.

=== 2 ===
- Arvid Brodersen, 91, Norwegian sociologist
- Ñuflo Chávez Ortiz, 72, Bolivian politician.
- Hugh Davson, 86, English physiologist.
- Jim Guyatt, 56, Australian rules footballer.
- Mcwilliam Lunguzi, 49–50, Malawian police officer, Inspector General of the Malawi Police Service, traffic collision.
- Mike Parobeck, 30, American comic book artist (Batman, Justice Society of America, El Diablo), diabetes.
- Ingvar Pettersson, 70, Swedish Olympic race walker (1964).
- Hal Robson, 84, American racing driver.
- Stefano Sibaldi, 91, Italian actor and voice actor.

=== 3 ===
- Herb Baumeister, 49, American serial killer, suicide.
- Krzysztof Beck, 66, Polish Olympic weightlifter (1956, 1960).
- B. Gerald Cantor, 79, American investment banker.
- Barry Crump, 61, New Zealand writer.
- Bert Hirschfeld, 67, Canadian ice hockey player (Montreal Canadiens).
- Sharon Hugueny, 52, American actress (The Young Lovers), cancer.
- Pim Jacobs, 61, Dutch musician.
- Raaj Kumar, 69, Indian actor.
- Dick de Man, 87, Dutch Olympic swimmer (1928).
- Curtis Stewart, 33, American football player (Dallas Cowboys).
- Bernard Zehrfuss, 84, French architect.

=== 4 ===
- Genevieve Blatt, 83, American politician
- Francesco Gotti, 72, Italian rower and Olympian (1948).
- Magnhild Hagelia, 92, Norwegian politician.
- Pierre Jaccoud, 90, Swiss lawyer.
- György Kunsági, 62, Hungarian swimmer and Olympian (1960).
- James O. Plinton Jr., 81, U.S. Army Air Corps pilot and member of the Tuskegee Airmen.
- Yagya Dutt Sharma, 73, Indian politician.

=== 5 ===
- Fred Davis, 74, Canadian broadcaster, stroke.
- Harold LeBruce Gilmore, 84, American politician.
- Donald Adam Hartman, 66, Canadian politician.
- Chuck Meekins, 63, American racing driver.
- Predrag Ostojić, 58, Yugoslav chess player, suicide.
- Mohamed Seddik, 56, Egyptian Olympic football player (1964).
- Piet Stam, 77, Dutch Olympic swimmer (1936).
- Clyde Wiegand, 81, American physicist, prostate cancer.
- Zsolt Zsoldos, 29, Hungarian Olympic judoka (1992).

=== 6 ===
- Kutlu Adalı, 61, Turkish Cypriot journalist, poet, socio-political researcher, and peace advocate.
- Kathy Ahern, 47, American golfer, breast cancer.
- Armando Calvo, 76, Puerto Rican-born Spanish actor, heart failure.
- Fred James Cassibry, 77, American district judge (United States District Court for the Eastern District of Louisiana).
- Gordon Hurst, 75, English cricketer.
- Fred Oberlander, 85, Austrian-born wrestler and Olympian (1948).
- Arnold Riegger, 75, American Olympic sports shooter (1960).
- Evgeni Rogov, 67, Soviet/Russian football player and manager.

=== 7 ===
- Jim Carstairs, 66, Australian rules footballer.
- David F. James, 90, American politician.
- Michael McGoldrick, 31, Northern Irish taxi driver, murdered by the Loyalist Volunteer Force.
- Vera Nedkova, 89, Bulgarian modernist painter.
- Friedrich von Stülpnagel, 82, German track and field athlete and Olympic medalist (1936).

=== 8 ===
- J. W. Alexander, 80, American musician, record producer and entrepreneur.
- Ernest Armstrong, 81, British politician.
- Carl Baer, 78, American basketball player.
- Jim Baumer, 65, American baseball player (Chicago White Sox, Cincinnati Reds), scout, and executive.
- Albrecht, Duke of Bavaria, 91, German prince.
- Jim Busby, 69, American Major League Baseball player and coach.
- Richard Groschopp, 90, German film director and screenwriter.
- Irene Prador, 84, Austrian-American actress and writer.
- Luka Predanić, 90, Croatian Olympic middle-distance runner (1928).
- Luis Manuel Rodríguez, 59, Cuban boxer.

=== 9 ===
- Melvin Belli, 88, American lawyer, author, and actor, pancreatic cancer.
- Paul Bhagwandas, 45, Suriname battalion commander known as "the executioner of Fort Zeelandia", cancer.
- Christopher Casson, 84, English-Irish actor.
- Sergey Kuryokhin, 42, Russian composer, pianist, music director, film actor and writer, cancer.
- Edward Purdy Ney, 75, American physicist.
- Aurora Redondo, 96, Spanish actress.
- József Sarlós, 87, Hungarian Olympic gymnast (1936).
- David Colville Smith, 74, Rhodesian/Zimbabwean farmer and politician.

=== 10 ===
- Dénes Birkás, 89, Hungarian ice and field hockey player and Olympian (1936).
- Bill Harrington, 82, Irish footballer.
- Paul King, 69, American producer and screenwriter.
- Lou Lichtveld, 92, Surinamese politician, playwright, poet and resistance fighter.
- Alex Manoogian, 95, Armenian-American industrial engineer, businessman, and philanthropist.
- Fred Meyer, 76, American gridiron football player (Philadelphia Eagles).
- Jindřich Tintěra, 95, Czech Olympic gymnast (1936).

=== 11 ===
- René Abadie, 60, French cyclist and Olympian (1956).
- T. F. Gilroy Daly, 65, American district judge (United States District Court for the District of Connecticut).
- Louis Gottlieb, 72, American bassist and comic spokesman for music trio The Limeliters.
- Czesław Kubiak, 64, Polish Olympic field hockey player (1960).
- Bertil Lundell, 87, Swedish ice hockey, football, bandy player and Olympian (1936).
- Ružica Meglaj-Rimac, 55, Yugoslav and Croatian basketball player.
- Florrie Rodrigo, 102, Dutch dancer and choreographer

=== 12 ===
- John Chancellor, 68, American journalist, stomach cancer.
- Walter Hassan, 91, British automotive engineer.
- Jonathan Melvoin, 34, American musician, heroin overdose.
- Nazar Mohammad, 75, Pakistani cricket player.
- Gottfried von Einem, 78, Austrian composer.
- Clarence Wilkinson, 85, American politician.

=== 13 ===
- Pandro S. Berman, 91, American film producer, heart failure.
- Anthony Gadd, 78, British Olympic bobsledder (1948).
- Loda Halama, 84, Polish dancer and actress.
- Bill Moe, 79, American ice hockey player (New York Rangers).
- Karen Simensen, 88, Norwegian figure skater and Olympian (1928).

=== 14 ===
- Jim Andrew, 59, English cricketer.
- Kenneth Bainbridge, 91, American physicist.
- Hank Camelli, 81, American baseball player (Pittsburgh Pirates, Boston Braves).
- Jeff Krosnoff, 31, American race car driver, racing accident.
- John Nolan, 70, American football player.
- Karl Paryla, 90, Austrian theater actor and director.
- Richard Ripley, 95, British athlete and Olympian (1924).
- Kathrine Taylor, 92, American author.

=== 15 ===
- William Dugan, 83, American Olympic rower (1936).
- Dana Hill, 32, American actress (National Lampoon's European Vacation, Cross Creek, Goof Troop), stroke.
- Sven Hörstadius, 98, Swedish embryologist.
- Jan Krogh Jensen, 38, Norwegian-Danish outlaw biker, gangster, homicide.
- Ed Sachs, 78, American basketball player.

=== 16 ===
- Édouard Max-Robert, 91, French Olympic hurdler (1928).
- John Panozzo, 47, American drummer, cirrhosis.
- Iosif Prut, 95, Soviet/Russian playwright and screenwriter.
- Adolf von Thadden, 75, German far-right politician.
- Djamel Zitouni, 32, Algerian Islamist terrorist group leader, killed.

=== 17 ===
- Charles Bartley, 74, American scientist.
- Chas Chandler, 57, English musician, record producer and manager, heart failure.
- Clemente Fernández, 76, Spanish footballer.
- Marvin Howe, 90, Canadian politician, member of the House of Commons of Canada (1953–1972).
- Geoffrey Jellicoe, 95, English architect, town planner, landscape architect and author.
- Bill Jones, 61, Australian rules footballer.
- John Joubert, 33, American serial killer, execution by electrocution.
- Bratko Kreft, 91, Slovenian playwright, writer, literary historian and director.
- Alan McGilvray, 86, Australian cricket player.
- Juan Paladino, 71, Uruguayan Olympic fencer (1948, 1960).
- Aubrey Reeve, 84, British long-distance runner and Olympian (1936).
- Paul Touvier, 81, French Nazi collaborator during World War II, prostate cancer.
- Notable people killed in the crash of TWA Flight 800:
  - Michel Breistroff, 25, French ice hockey player.
  - Marcel Dadi, 44, Tunisian-French guitarist.
  - David Hogan, 47, American composer.
  - Jed Johnson, 47, American interior designer and director.
  - Pam Lychner, 37, American crime victims' rights advocate.
  - Rico Puhlmann, 62, German fashion photographer.

=== 18 ===
- Stephen Donaldson, 49, American bisexual rights activist, and political activist, AIDS-related complications.
- José Manuel Fuente, 50, Spanish road racing cyclist, pancreatitis.
- Duke Christian Louis of Mecklenburg, 83, German noble.
- Mario Maiocchi, 83, Italian Olympic ice hockey player (1936).
- Martin Summerfield, 79, American physicist and rocket scientist.

=== 19 ===
- Raymond Burnett, 82, American football player (Chicago Cardinals), and coach.
- Berkeley Cole, 82, English Anglican priest and author.
- Mervyn Cowie, 87, British conservationist.
- Guy Hénon, 84, French Olympic field hockey player (1936).
- Dan Lewandowski, 68, American baseball player (St. Louis Cardinals).
- E. T. Mensah, 77, Ghanaian musician.
- Kevin Scanlan, 86, Australian rules footballer.
- Sverre Wilberg, 66, Norwegian actor.

=== 20 ===
- Anna Chandy, 91, first female judge of India.
- John Govan, 81, Australian cricketer.
- Eddie Jankowski, 83, American gridiron football player (Green Bay Packers).
- Colin Mitchell, 70, British Army soldier and politician.
- Bernt Østerkløft, 90, Norwegian Olympic skier (1936).
- Raphael Patai, 85, Hungarian-Jewish ethnographer, historian, orientalist and anthropologist.
- František Plánička, 92, Czech football goalkeeper.
- Arunachala Sreenivasan, 87, Indian food technologist and nutritional scientist .
- Randy Stuart, 71, American actress, lung cancer.

=== 21 ===
- Luana Anders, 58, American actress and screenwriter, breast cancer.
- Rafael Cepeda, 86, Puerto Rican musician, myocardial infarction.
- Herb Edelman, 62, American actor (The Golden Girls, St. Elsewhere, The Good Guys), pulmonary emphysema.
- Inger Jacobsen, 72, Norwegian singer and actress, cancer.
- Wolfe Morris, 71, English actor.
- Walt Moryn, 70, American Major League Baseball outfielder.

=== 22 ===
- Rob Collins, 33, English musician, car crash.
- Tamara Danz, 43, German lead singer and lyricist of the rock group Silly, breast cancer.
- Carl Goldenberg, 88, Canadian lawyer and senator.
- Maggie Kalka, 83, Finnish sprint canoeist and Olympic fencer (1952).
- Jack Knowles, 64, Australian rules footballer.
- Vermont C. Royster, 82, American journalist and editor.

=== 23 ===
- Herb Abrams, 41, American professional wrestling promoter, cocaine overdose.
- Clara Cook, 75, American baseball player.
- Patriarch Parthenius III of Alexandria, 76, Greek Eastern Orthodox bishop.
- Hamilton Fish IV, 70, American politician, member of the United States House of Representatives (1969–1995).
- Jim Forbes, 87, Australian rules footballer.
- Tone Gazzari, 84, Croatian Olympic swimmer (1936).
- Jean Howell, 68, American actress.
- Jerry Kelly, 78, American basketball player (Boston Celtics, Providence Steamrollers).
- Jessica Mitford, 78, English author and one of the Mitford sisters, lung cancer.
- Jean Muir, 85, American actress and educator.
- Red Munger, 77, American baseball player (St. Louis Cardinals, Pittsburgh Pirates).
- Frederick Osborne, 87, Australian politician and government minister.
- Victor Railton, 90, Canadian politician, member of the House of Commons of Canada (1972–1979).
- Eric Ridder, 78, American sailor and Olympic champion (1952).
- Aliki Vougiouklaki, 62, Greek actress and theatrical producer, pancreatic cancer.
- Ed Wineapple, 90, American baseball player (Washington Senators).

=== 24 ===
- Virginia Christine, 76, American actress, cardiovascular disease.
- Frank Evans, 71, British middle-distance runner and Olympian (1952).
- Nacho Martínez, 44, Spanish actor, lung cancer.
- Oreste Plath, 88, Chilean writer and folklorist.
- Alphonso Roberts, 58, Vincentian political activist and cricket player.
- Jock Wallace, 60, Scottish football player and manager, amyotrophic lateral sclerosis.

=== 25 ===
- Blanca Canales, 90, Puerto Rican politician and independence advocate.
- Willie Jones, 79, Welsh cricketer.
- M. A. Manickavelu Naicker, 99, Indian politician.
- Mikael Tariverdiev, 64, Soviet/Armenian composer.
- Howard Vernon, 82, Swiss actor.

=== 26 ===
- Jackie Cerone, 82, American mobster and boss of the Chicago Outfit.
- Evelyn Danzig, 94, American songwriter and classical pianist.
- Horacio Esteves, 55, Venezuelan sprinter and Olympian (1960, 1968).
- Héctor P. García, 82, Mexican-American physician, surgeon, and civil rights advocate.
- Heriberto Herrera, 70, Paraguayan-Spanish football player.
- Floyd Stahl, 97, American collegiate athletic coach.
- Max Winter, 93, American businessman and sport executive.

=== 27 ===
- Dame Jane Drew, 85, English writer, architect and academic, cancer.
- Yordan Filipov, 50, Bulgarian association football player.
- Johann Hofstätter, 83, Austrian association football player and coach.
- Takeyuki Kanda, 52, Japanese animator, traffic collision.
- Arthur Luke, 73, Australian rules footballer.
- Rogers Pierre, 83, American baseball player.
- Al Rollins, 69, Canadian ice hockey player (Toronto Maple Leafs, Chicago Black Hawks, New York Rangers).
- Antal Zirczy, 98, Hungarian Olympic fencer (1936).

=== 28 ===
- Cortez Gray, 80, American basketball player.
- Bryant Haliday, 68, American actor.
- Ivan V. Lalić, 65, Serbian writer and poet.
- Roger Tory Peterson, 87, American naturalist, ornithologist and writer.
- Michel Philippot, 71, French composer, mathematician, musicologist, and broadcaster.
- Jaroslav Vejvoda, 76, Czech soccer player and coach.

=== 29 ===
- Aruna Asaf Ali, 87, Indian independence activist.
- Georgi Dakov, 28, Bulgarian high jumper and Olympian (1992), traffic collision.
- Lauren Gale, 79, American basketball player (Oregon Ducks).
- Bill Green, 71, American jazz musician (reeds).
- Bill Jackowski, 81, American baseball umpire.
- Roger Nelson, 64, American and Canadian football player.
- Muhammad Osimi, 75, Soviet/Tajik philosopher, soldier, poet, and academic, killed in action.
- Hilary Pritchard, 54, British actress.
- Armas Pyy, 83, Finnish footballer and Olympian (1936).
- Chick Reiser, 82, American basketball player and coach.
- Sean Roberge, 23, Canadian actor, car accident.
- Marcel-Paul Schützenberger, 75, French mathematician and Doctor of Medicine.
- Jason Thirsk, 28, American bass guitarist, suicide by gunshot.

=== 30 ===
- Claudette Colbert, 92, American actress (It Happened One Night, Since You Went Away, Private Worlds), Oscar winner (1935), stroke.
- Margaret Cousins, 91, American writer and editor, she worked as a senior editor at Doubleday, special editor at Holt, Rinehart & Winston, and both fiction and book editor for Ladies' Home Journal
- Carlos Droguett, 83, Chilean writer.
- Arihiro Hase, 31, Japanese voice actor and actor, suicide by jumping, he jumped from his apartment's window seven stories to the ground.
- Ismael Mosqueira, 84-85, Mexican Olympic gymnast (1932).
- Anthony Peck, 49, American actor, cancer.
- Magda Schneider, 87, German actress.
- Constantin Teașcă, 73, Romanian football manager.

=== 31 ===
- Petar Džadžić, 66, Serbian literary critic and academic.
- Howie Goss, 61, American baseball player (Pittsburgh Pirates, Houston Colt .45s).
- Ricardo Molinari, 98, Argentine writer.
- Seagram, 26, American rapper, shot.
- Neville Wadia, 84, Indian-British businessman.
- Jay Lee Webb, 59, American singer, pancreatic cancer.
