= Vlasta Děkanová =

- Děkanová in 1938

Personal information
- Born: 5 September 1909 Prague, Bohemia, Austria-Hungary
- Died: 16 October 1974 (aged 65) Prague, Czechoslovakia

Gymnastics career
- Discipline: Women's artistic gymnastics
- Country represented: Czechoslovakia
Medal record
Representing Czechoslovakia
Olympic Games
Silver medal – second place	1936 Berlin	Team
World Championships
Gold medal – first place	1934 Budapest	Team
Gold medal – first place	1934 Budapest	All-around
Gold medal – first place	1938 Prague	Team
Gold medal – first place	1938 Prague	All-around
Gold medal – first place	1938 Prague	Uneven Bars
Gold medal – first place	1938 Prague	Balance Beam
Bronze medal – third place	1938 Prague	Vault

Vlasta Děkanová (5 September 1909 – 16 October 1974) was a Czech artistic gymnast who represented Czechoslovakia. She was the first World All-Around Champion (in 1934) as well as the first repeat World All-Around Champion (in 1938) in women's artistic gymnastics, as she successfully defended her title at those next World Championships. Additionally she was an Olympian, as part of the silver-medal-winning Czech team at the 1936 Berlin Summer Olympics, as well as being team coach to the Olympic Champion team at the next Summer Olympics in London in 1948.

== Early life ==
Děkanová was born in Prague in 1909. Her father was a dedicated member of Sokol and the manager of a gym in the Žižkov district of Prague.

She progressed through the Sokol system, graduating in 1933. She performed locally at the Lucerna Palace. Beginning in 1928, Děkanová started touring and performing in exhibitions internationally in countries including Belgium, France, Netherlands, Poland, and Yugoslavia. In the United States, she performed in exhibitions in Cleveland, New York, and Washington.

== Competitive career ==
=== Domestic, international, intercontinental and World Championship finishes ===
This photograph that would prove quite prophetic, from a 1932 issue of Czechoslovak journal "Věstník Sokolský", showcases 3 of their gymnasts, all of whom either had already become or would become World All-Around Champions in the sport. Alois Hudec, right, had already accomplished this in 1931; Děkanová, center, would also in both 1934 and 1938; and Jan Gajdoš, left, in 1938. The caption reads "Our Best" (translated from Czech).

Děkanová figures into the competitive sporting record at least as far back as 1930. At a domestic Czechoslovak competition in Spring or early Summer that year which served as a qualification for the upcoming championships of the Slavic Falconry Association in Belgrade, Děkanová qualified among the top three competitors that her country eventually sent. The other two competitors were Marie Lorencova and Vlasta Jarúskova. At that competition in Belgrade, which was also important because, for the men, it served as a preliminary and qualifier for the upcoming 1930 World Championships in Luxembourg, competing against her two Czechoslovak teammates, as well as three Polish and six Yugoslav competitors, Děkanová finished 2nd, having achieved 83.39% of the maximum score. Finishing at the top of the standings was her teammate Lorencova with 88.93% of the maximum score, and just below her, her other teammate Jarúskova with 82.64%. The highest-finishing non-Czech was 4th place Vera Kovač of Yugoslavia with 67.70%, and the highest-finishing Polish competitor was 6th place Stefanija Gawalkiewnezowna with 63.03%.

At other domestic competitions that served as qualifiers to other international events, including a lead-in to the 1936 Berlin Olympics, Děkanová secured first-place position. In a competition, on 16 June 1935 in the “Tyrs Dom” (a venue dedicated to Sokol founder Miroslav Tyrš), out of a field of 33 competitors, Děkanová, with 46.7 points (out of a maximum possible of 50) placed first ahead of a number of other individuals in the top 10, here, who would be World Championship or Olympic teammates of hers: 2nd place Vlasta Foltová (1934 Worlds and 1936 Olympics) with 45.8 points, 3rd place Jaroslava Bajerová (1934 Worlds and 1936 Olympics) with 44.6 points, 5th place Milena Šebková (1934 Worlds) with 43.2 points, 6th place perennial teammate and top competitor of Děkanová Zdeňka Veřmiřovská (1934 Worlds, 1936 Olympics, 1938 Worlds, 1948 Olympics) with 42.9 points, 7th place Božena Dobešová (1936 Olympics, 1938 Worlds) with 42.8 points, 8th place Anna Hřebřinová (1934 Worlds, 1936 Olympics) with 42.5 points, and 9th place Marie Větrovská (1936 Olympics) with 42.3 points. Another supporting piece of information suggesting Děkanová's consistent excellence is that at a Czechoslovak selection competition held on 15 May 1938, just weeks before the 1938 Worlds held on 30 June and 1 July, Děkanová placed 1st among all 19 individuals.

This coverage from the 14 July 1932 issue of Sokolsky Glasnik provides the results of the intercontinentally-contested 9th Prague Slet in 1932. The men's results, center, showing Jan Gajdoš as overall champion, and the women's results, top right, showing Děkanová as overall champion, were repeated with both as champions again at the 10th Prague Slet in 1938, which also served as the 1938 World Championships.

Probably Děkanová's greatest competitive accomplishment on record before any official World Championship or Olympic Debut was her outcome at the 9th Prague Slet in 1932. An event that occurred on the 100th anniversary of the birth of Miroslav Tyrš, held from June 12th-29th and July 2nd-6th, this was a monumental festival with "180,000 spectators…130,000 gymnasts…[a] parade with 65,000 marchers…[and] advanced gymnastic skills" that registered, over the week-long event, "a million spectators". In the competitive advanced gymnastics segment of this festival, as one of 7 Czechoslovak entrants, 4 Yugoslav entrants, and 4 Sokol entrants from the USA, she finished first at these intercontinental games in gold-medal position with 1019 points (or 88.6% of the total maximum of 1150 points). Rounding out the medal positions were Anna Hřebřinová with 933 points (81.13%), and Vera Kovač 857 points (74.52%), and rounding out the top 5 were Zdeňka Veřmiřovská with 844 points (73.39%) and Milada Holečkova, a Czech-American Sokol entrant, with 834 points (72.52%). Interestingly and coincidentally enough, this year, 1932, was, at least as recently as of 2006 when the FIG published its 125-year anniversary publication, the only year out of their at-the-time 125 years of existence where they had more than one Congress – one was here in Prague, and the other one was later in Los Angeles (the host city for that year's Summer Olympics).

On pages 5 and 6 of their 8 June 1934 edition, the Slovenian-Yugoslav newspaper Sokolski Glasnik's coverage of the 1934 Worlds singled out Děkanová, from among all female competitors, (as well as Eugen Mack of Switzerland, looking on as his teammate, 1928 Olympic All-Around Champion Georges Miez performs a skill), with photographs, as both of them became World All-Around Champions here. The caption following Děkanová's photo identification translates to "World Champion in Gymnastics".

Děkanová made her World Championship competitive debut at the very first 1934 World Artistic Gymnastics Championships for women held June 11 and 12 that year in Budapest, Hungary. Reportedly, cheating in the scoring was uncovered and corrected, allowing the Czechoslovak team, of which she was a part, to win the team title. There was no individual competition. But when all of the individual totals were added up, Děkanová had the highest overall total. Although she was not the highest overall scorer in the gymnastics apparatus segment of the competition, (there were also Track and field and Athletics segments), her scores from among the various gymnastics apparatus were consistently good enough to leave her in 3rd place in the gymnastics-apparatus-only segment of the competition, behind only her teammate Veřmiřovská, and Judit Toth of Hungary, who was the highest scorer in this regard. That, combined with being one of the only 4 individuals in the competition to score the maximum possible points in the Track and field and Athletics segment, was good enough to allow her to finish as the individual champion of these games. Four years later, Děkanová competed at the next installment of the 1938 World Artistic Gymnastics Championships where she again was the highest individual finisher among all competitors, successfully defending her placement at the previous World Championships. This time, as an even more seasoned competitor, and perhaps aided by the multiple cancellations-of-appearance of various delegations (Dutch, Germans, Hungarians) due to the unstable political situation in CzechoSlovakia, Děkanová issued a more resoundingly dominant performance, at least judging by the results. Against a number of her top competitors from the 1934 Worlds and 1936 Olympics who returned for these games, such as her teammate Veřmiřovská and Janina Skirlińska of Poland, she came in, throughout 7 events, 1st place on 3 of them, in medal position on another 3, and, at least from among the top 10 all-around individuals, 5th (out of 32) on her weakest event.

Although there is lack of consistent and detailed clarity among various sources as to whether there were individual accolades at these first two Worlds Championships where women competed, according to an official document published by the FIG, Děkanová "won the general competition at the 1934 and 1938 World Championships." The rationale for her success was articulated in the official proceedings of the 10th Sokol Slet: (In Czech) "Stala se tedy první světovou přebornicí v ženském tělocviku sestra Vlasta Děkanová… Zasloužila si ho dobře svou všestranností a závodní spolehlivostí, získanou pilnou a vytrvalou přípravou na všechny velké závody sokolské i mezinárodní za posledních deset let." / (In English) "Sister Vlasta Děkanová thus became the first world champion in women's gymnastics...She deserved to be the best due to her versatility and competitive reliability, gained by diligent and persistent preparation for all significant Sokol and international races in the last ten years.

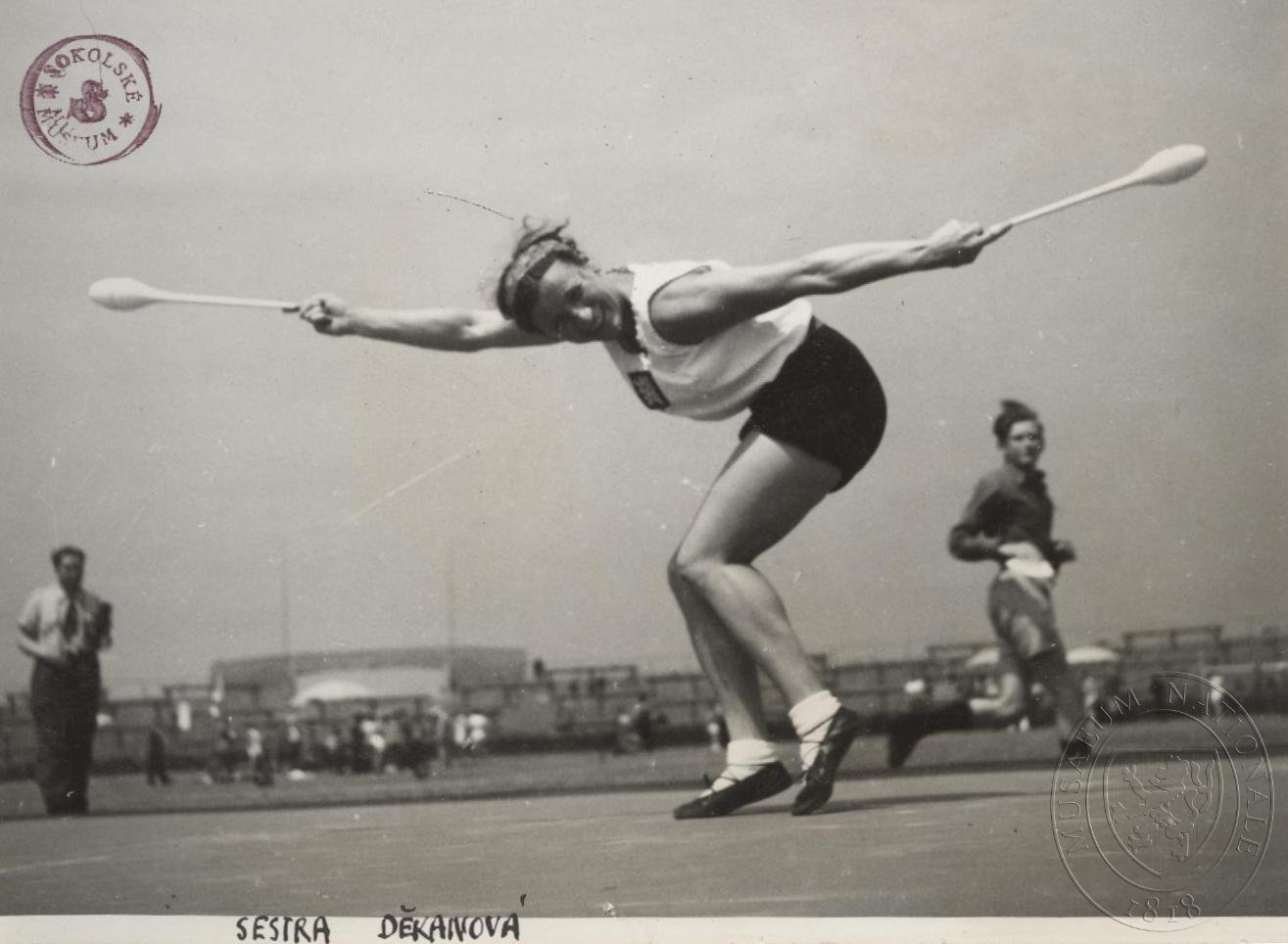
Děkanová at the 10th Sokol slet in 1938, of which the 1938 Worlds were a part.

=== 1936 Berlin Summer Olympics ===
Heading into the 1936 Summer Olympics in Berlin as reigning World All-Around Champion (and eventual successful defender of her world all-around title at the next World Championships in 1938), Děkanová was a favorite to do extremely well and contribute heavily towards her team's overall score and placement in the team standings. However, her excellent and consistent placement at the standing world championships and other competitions met with a considerable reversal of fortune at these games. Although there was no individual all-around competition for the women, individual standings were, nevertheless, tabulated in the official Olympic report. While placing near the top in the competitive field of 64 total individual contestants on both the uneven bars (8th place) and vault (5th place) apparatuses with scores that were consistently relatively very good on both the compulsory and voluntary exercises, the only one of her six apparatus performances (including both compulsory and voluntary exercises on each apparatus) in the entire competition that was in the top 3 and reflective of her international champion status was her compulsory exercise on vault which was given the 3rd-highest mark for that exercise in the competition. Particularly on balance beam, her reversal of fortune was most revealing as she placed 22nd with both her compulsory and voluntary exercises being given marks that were each well outside of the top 10. In summary, at the Olympics, Děkanová lost her 1st-place finish, which she successfully defended at the next World Championships, by dropping from 1st to 6th place, and her Czechoslovak team was unsuccessful in defending their World Team Champions reputation, taking 2nd place to the home German team.

The reversal of fortune of Děkanová's previous and further consistent champion status at these games headlines the much more extreme reversal of fortune experienced by both of the other then-current women's world all-around medalists – Hungary's Margit Kalocsai and Poland's Janina Skirlińska who were, respectively, the 2nd and 3rd place finishers (out of a competitive field of 40 contestants) at the 1934 World Championships. Kalocsai's and Skirlińska's extreme reversals of fortune paralleled, with immediately adjacent juxtapositioning, each other's, with score placements that nearly universally were far from being aligned with their other international competitive standings – whereas Kalocsai finished immediately above Skirlińska at the 1934 World Championships (2nd, to Skirlińska's 3rd), she finished immediately below Skirlińska (41st, to Skirlińska's 40th) at these 1936 Berlin Summer Olympics. With the exception of Kalocsai's marks on balance beam, where her combined compulsory and voluntary scores gave her an overall score of 5th on that apparatus, all of both Kalocsai's and Skirlińska's marks in both the compulsory and voluntary exercises on each apparatus (Kalocsai was 61st on parallel bars, 33rd on vault, and, again, 5th on balance beam, whereas Skirlińska was 48th on parallel bars, 36th on vault, and 15th on balance beam) were far from being at the top of the competitive field. (Two years later, whereas Kalocsai lacked the opportunity to re-assert her high ranking at the world championships due to Hungary not sending a team, Skirlińska re-asserted her competitive excellence at the next world championships in 1938 where, in the all-around individual standings, she was the 4th-place finisher (out of a field of 32 competitors), the highest-finishing non-Czechoslovak female competitor at those championships in Prague, Czechoslovakia.)

Additionally, the reversals of fortune of many of the top gymnasts in the world at these games were not limited to the reversals of fortune of Děkanová and her fellow 1934 World Championships all-around women's medalists Kalocsai and Skirlińska. Their reversals of fortune were mirrored on the men's side in the individual all-around competition, as well, again quite extremely in numerous instances, by several individuals who either already were or would become World or Olympic all-around champions or medalists that decade:

Děkanová was competitor #11 in the gymnastics competition at the 1936 Berlin Summer Olympic Games, as is illustrated by this cropped photograph, from the Official Olympic Report, of her performing her compulsory exercise on the uneven bars.

- 1924 Olympic All-Around Champion from Yugoslavia, Leon Štukelj (also 8th at the 1922 Worlds, 13th at the 1926 Worlds, Bronze (3rd) All-Around Medalist at the 1928 Olympics, 47th (low placement due to injury, and subsequent withdrawal from the rest of the competition, from same substandard event arena conditions that contributed to the death of his teammate Anton Malej) at the 1930 Worlds, and 10th at the 1931 Worlds) finished 32nd.
- 1928 Olympic All-Around Champion from Switzerland, Georges Miez (23rd at the 1924 Olympics, 8th at the 1931 Worlds, Floor Exercise Silver-Medalist at the 1932 Los Angeles Summer Olympics, and 7th at the 1934 Worlds) finished 14th.
- 1930 World All-Around Champion from Yugoslavia, Josip Primožič (also 11th at the 1926 Worlds, 5th at the 1928 Amsterdam Summer Olympics, 9th at the 1931 Worlds, and 19th at the 1938 Worlds), finished 31st.
- 1938 World All-Around Champion from Czechoslovakia, Jan Gajdoš (also 2nd at the 1930 Worlds, 3rd at the 1931 Worlds, and 6th at the 1934 Worlds,) finished 27th.
- 1932 Olympic All-Around Silver Medalist from Hungary, István Pelle (also 9th at the 1930 Worlds, and 7th at the 1931 Worlds) finished 18th.
- 1932 Olympic All-Around Bronze Medalist from Finland, Heikki Savolainen (also 1st-place finisher at the 1931 Worlds, and 4th at the 1934 Worlds) finished 9th.
- 1930 World All-Around Bronze Medalist from Czechoslovakia, Emanuel Löffler (also 10th at the 1928 Olympics, 1934 World All-Around Bronze Medalist and 9th at the 1938 Worlds) finished 40th, which was exactly the same dramatic reversal of fortune that Poland's Janina Skirlińska experienced at these games as, like Löffler, she was also both 3rd at the 1934 Worlds and 40th at the 1936 Olympics (as referenced previously).
- Lastly and, by far, most dramatically, reigning 1932 Olympic All-Around Champion from Italy, Romeo Neri (also 4th at the 1928 Olympics, 5th at the 1931 Worlds, and 2nd at the 1934 Worlds), not even close to finishing the competition, and with scores that were consistently near the bottom of all of the competitors in the field, finished last in 111th.

In summary, Děkanová was far from alone in being the only world or Olympic all-around champion or medalist who experienced a stark reversal in fortune, many of them being quite extreme, in their competitive endeavors. She was joined in this experience by no fewer than 10 other gymnasts from no fewer than 7 different countries, including 3 different Olympic all-around champions and 2 different World All-Around Champions: Děkanová's fellow Czechoslovaks Jan Gajdoš and Emanuel Löffler, Finland's Heikki Savolainen, Hungary's Margit Kalocsai and István Pelle, Italy's Romeo Neri, Poland's Janina Skirlińska, Switzerland's Georges Miez, and Yugoslavia's Josip Primožič and Leon Štukelj.

== World War II activities and post-competitive career ==
Like many other Sokol members (gymnasts or otherwise) such as 1922 World All-Around Champion František Pecháček, 1928 Olympic Parallel Bars Champion Ladislav Vácha, and 1938 World All-Around Champion Jan Gajdoš, all also Czechoslovak, and all of whom lost their lives as resistance fighters during World War II, Děkanová was also involved in the underground Czechoslovak resistance in World War II. She was a magistrate and was involved in copying and distributing material from illegal publications, such as "V boj" ("Into combat") by prominent journalist Irena Bernášková. She was punished for such activities, once spending several weeks in jail. She also served as a volunteer nurse during the Prague uprising of May 1945 and helped remove wounded soldiers from the front line of combat.

After World War II, she remained active in the sport and trained young gymnasts. She was also involved in developing and maintaining city infrastructure as a planner and dispatcher of road and water management buildings.

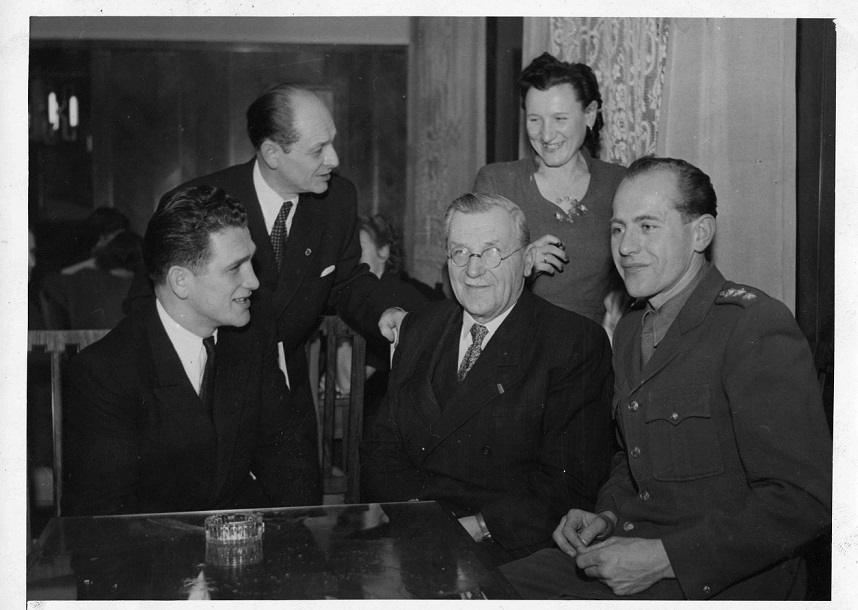
L-R: Olympic Boxing Champion Július Torma, Czechoslovak Prime Minister Antonín Zápotocký, Prague Mayor Václav Vacek, Děkanová, Olympic Running Champion Emil Zátopek, at the 1948 London Summer Olympic Games

=== Post-WWII competitive record and reputation ===
Despite being in her mid-to-late 30s and having earned considerable laurels, Děkanová returned to competitive gymnastics in some capacity after World War II. She appears to have been an object of contention in power struggles among various officials. In a letter, dated 1 August 1948, to the Czechoslovak National Women's Board of Instructors and the Women's Technical Committee, Marie Provazníková, leader of Sokol women and the head of the International Gymnastics Federation's own Women's Technical Committee, stated that functionaries unknown to her named Děkanová to the Czechoslovak Women's Gymnastics Olympics Team for the 1948 London Summer Olympics. About this nebulous administrative maneuver, however, Provazníková stated in that letter

"Deliberately, much less with approval of the Women's Technical Committee COS, sister Vlasta Děkanová was named a substitute on the competing team. She is not prepared for the contest and lacks other qualifications, which in all probability will be impossible to remedy and the team will start minus an alternate."

Additionally, in her autobiography, Provazníková wrote further on this particular subject.

"They [the "communists"] simply demanded I put Vlasta Děkanová on the list of members of the Olympic team. I refused, stating that inclusion in this group was earned through a series of tests and no one had the right to change this. I also added that to use Děkanová as an alternate would imperil the final outcome, since both substitutes would be involved in the optional team exercise with indian clubs, which was her weak point. She was a former top competitor, brought up in the old school and lacked the supple, fluent movement needed for that particular drill. While I was chairman of the Women's Technical Committee FIG the communists could not afford a public break with me as it would cause worldwide attention. Nonetheless, since Nora Buddeusová was an excellent international judge and we needed her in that capacity, we moved Vlasta Děkanová up from assistant to head coach. We paid dearly for that compromise at the games."

Provazníková's assertions about Děkanová, however, contrast with at least one piece of evidence suggesting Děkanová's continued prime competitive abilities post-WWII when she was 37 years old. In a domestic competition, on 6 October 1946, featuring dozens of contestants, Děkanová placed 2nd with 66.7 points, which was 95.28% of the maximum score of 70, just behind her perennial World Championship and Olympic teammate Zdeňka Veřmiřovská who scored 67.2 points, or 96% of the maximum possible score, and 5 or more percentage points ahead of all of the rest of her competitors. In this 2nd place position, Děkanová placed far ahead of 3 individuals who apparently made the Olympic team less than 2 years later: Miloslava Misáková who was tied for 12th place with 56.2 points, Olga Šilhánová who was tied for 18th place with 54.7 points, and Věra Růžičková who was in 30th place with 44.2 points.

== Legacy ==
Although the Official Olympic Report for the 1952 Helsinki Olympics does not specifically state that this was the first time that medals were awarded to women on the sole basis of individual performances, it does state "Individual competitions in women's gymnastics were included in the Olympic Programme for the first time." World Gymnastics, the official governing body for the sport, stated about those games "1952 marked the first year an individual women's competition was held in addition to a team competition". What is currently listed here on Wikipedia as well as what is written about the 1952 Olympics in an article on one gymnastics blog ("It was the first time women would be granted individual medals") strongly suggest that no individual Olympic medals were awarded to individual woman gymnasts on the sole basis of individual performances prior to 1952. From among the 3 installments of the World Championships that had official competitions for women that existed before 1952, Děkanová was the All-Around Champion at 2 of 3 of them (tallying numerous first-place apparatus finishes at her 2nd Worlds appearance), and at both of the 2 World Championships from among those 3 that existed prior to World War II, Děkanová was the All-Around Champion of both. One gymnastics blog states "Vlasta Děkanová was the undisputed top WAG [Woman Artistic Gymnast] prior to World War II." In summary, at the combined World and Olympic level, currently-prevailing data points to Děkanová as being the most decorated individual woman gymnast for the era prior to World War II.

Additionally, as Děkanová led her team to its first two World Championship victories and coached her team to Olympic victory in 1948, she can be credited as having played a very crucial role in establishing the legacy of her country on the women's side in the sport of artistic gymnastics. At the 15 World Championship and Olympic competitions held, from 1934 to 1970, they won team medals at 7 of the 8 editions of the World Championships during that era and 6 of the 7 editions of the Olympic Games during that era. (In fact, the Czechoslovak women's team's participation at the Olympic level stretches all the way back to the first-ever Olympiad at which women's gymnastics was included as a competitive event - the 1928 Amsterdam Olympics - although they did not participate in an officially competitive role.) One of their only two non-medal-wins, at the 1950 World Championships, was due to apparently having been one of the "...regrettable mishaps, absentees, and so on..." at those games. Therefore, Děkanová was a crucial pioneer who initiated the legacy of her country having won women's team medals at 13 out of their 14 showings at those 15 various championships throughout the 1934-1970 time period.
