= World Artistic Gymnastics Championships – Women's individual all-around =

Women's events at the Artistic Gymnastics World Championships were first held in 1934 at the 10th World Championships. Only the All-Around and Team events were held. In 1950, at the 12th World Championships, the other apparatus events were added.

The women's individual all-around event was not held in 1992, 1996, and 2002.

Three medals are awarded: gold for first place, silver for second place, and bronze for third place. Tie breakers have not been used in every year. In the event of a tie between two gymnasts, both names are listed, and the following position (second for a tie for first, third for a tie for second) is left empty because a medal was not awarded for that position. If three gymnastics tied for a position, the following two positions are left empty.

== Medalists ==
Bold numbers in brackets denotes record number of victories.

Year	Location	Gold	Silver	Bronze
1934	(Hungary) Budapest	(Czechoslovakia) Vlasta Děkanová	(Hungary) Margit Kalocsai	(Poland) Janina Skirlińska
1938	(Czechoslovakia) Prague	(Czechoslovakia) Vlasta Děkanová	(Czechoslovakia) Zdeňka Veřmiřovská	(Czechoslovakia) Matylda Pálfyová
1942	Not held due to World War II			
1950	(Switzerland) Basel	(Poland) Helena Rakoczy	(Sweden) Ann-Sofi Pettersson	(Austria) Gertrude Kolar
1954	(Italy) Rome	(Soviet Union) Galina Rudko	(Czechoslovakia) Eva Bosáková	(Poland) Helena Rakoczy
1958	(Soviet Union) Moscow	(Soviet Union) Larisa Latynina	(Czechoslovakia) Eva Bosáková	(Soviet Union) Tamara Manina
1962	(Czechoslovakia) Prague	(Soviet Union) Larisa Latynina	(Czechoslovakia) Věra Čáslavská	(Soviet Union) Irina Pervushina
1966	(West Germany) Dortmund	(Czechoslovakia) Věra Čáslavská	(Soviet Union) Natalia Kuchinskaya	(Japan) Keiko Ikeda
1970	(Socialist Federal Republic of Yugoslavia) Ljubljana	(Soviet Union) Ludmilla Tourischeva	(East Germany) Erika Zuchold	(Soviet Union) Zinaida Voronina
1974	(Bulgaria) Varna	(Soviet Union) Ludmilla Tourischeva	(Soviet Union) Olga Korbut	(East Germany) Angelika Hellmann
1978	(France) Strasbourg	(Soviet Union) Elena Mukhina	(Soviet Union) Nellie Kim	(Soviet Union) Natalia Shaposhnikova
1979	(United States) Fort Worth	(Soviet Union) Nellie Kim	(East Germany) Maxi Gnauck	(Romania) Melita Ruhn
1981	(Soviet Union) Moscow	(Soviet Union) Olga Bicherova	(Soviet Union) Maria Filatova	(Soviet Union) Yelena Davydova
1983	(Hungary) Budapest	(Soviet Union) Natalia Yurchenko	(Soviet Union) Olga Mostepanova	(Romania) Ecaterina Szabó
1985	(Canada) Montreal	(Soviet Union) Oksana Omelianchik (Soviet Union) Yelena Shushunova	—N/a	(East Germany) Dagmar Kersten
1987	(Netherlands) Rotterdam	(Romania) Aurelia Dobre	(Soviet Union) Yelena Shushunova	(Romania) Daniela Silivaș
1989	(West Germany) Stuttgart	(Soviet Union) Svetlana Boginskaya	(Soviet Union) Natalia Lashchenova	(Soviet Union) Olga Strazheva
1991	(United States) Indianapolis	(United States) Kim Zmeskal	(Soviet Union) Svetlana Boginskaya	(Romania) Cristina Bontaș
1992	(France) Paris	No all-around event held		
1993	(United Kingdom) Birmingham	(United States) Shannon Miller	(Romania) Gina Gogean	(Ukraine) Tatiana Lysenko
1994	(Australia) Brisbane	(United States) Shannon Miller	(Romania) Lavinia Miloșovici	(Russia) Dina Kochetkova
1995	(Japan) Sabae	(Ukraine) Lilia Podkopayeva	(Russia) Svetlana Khorkina	(Romania) Lavinia Miloșovici
1996	(Puerto Rico) San Juan	No all-around event held		
1997	(Switzerland) Lausanne	(Russia) Svetlana Khorkina	(Romania) Simona Amânar	(Russia) Yelena Produnova
1999	(China) Tianjin	(Romania) Maria Olaru	(Ukraine) Viktoria Karpenko	(Russia) Elena Zamolodchikova
2001	(Belgium) Ghent	(Russia) Svetlana Khorkina	(Russia) Natalia Ziganshina	(Romania) Andreea Răducan
2002	(Hungary) Debrecen	No all-around event held		
2003	(United States) Anaheim	(Russia) Svetlana Khorkina (3)	(United States) Carly Patterson	(China) Zhang Nan
2005	(Australia) Melbourne	(United States) Chellsie Memmel	(United States) Nastia Liukin	(Australia) Monette Russo
2006	(Denmark) Aarhus	(Italy) Vanessa Ferrari	(United States) Jana Bieger	(Romania) Sandra Izbașa
2007	(Germany) Stuttgart	(United States) Shawn Johnson	(Romania) Steliana Nistor	(Brazil) Jade Barbosa (Italy) Vanessa Ferrari
2009	(United Kingdom) London	(United States) Bridget Sloan	(United States) Rebecca Bross	(Japan) Kōko Tsurumi
2010	(Netherlands) Rotterdam	(Russia) Aliya Mustafina	(China) Jiang Yuyuan	(United States) Rebecca Bross
2011	(Japan) Tokyo	(United States) Jordyn Wieber	(Russia) Viktoria Komova	(China) Yao Jinnan
2013	(Belgium) Antwerp	(United States) Simone Biles	(United States) Kyla Ross	(Russia) Aliya Mustafina
2014	(China) Nanning	(United States) Simone Biles	(Romania) Larisa Iordache	(United States) Kyla Ross
2015	(United Kingdom) Glasgow	(United States) Simone Biles	(United States) Gabby Douglas	(Romania) Larisa Iordache
2017	(Canada) Montreal	(United States) Morgan Hurd	(Canada) Ellie Black	(Russia) Elena Eremina
2018	(Qatar) Doha	(United States) Simone Biles	(Japan) Mai Murakami	(United States) Morgan Hurd
2019	(Germany) Stuttgart	(United States) Simone Biles	(China) Tang Xijing	(Russia) Angelina Melnikova
2021	(Japan) Kitakyushu	Angelina Melnikova	(United States) Leanne Wong	(United States) Kayla DiCello
2022	(United Kingdom) Liverpool	(Brazil) Rebeca Andrade	(United States) Shilese Jones	(United Kingdom) Jessica Gadirova
2023	(Belgium) Antwerp	(United States) Simone Biles (6)	(Brazil) Rebeca Andrade	(United States) Shilese Jones
2025	(Indonesia) Jakarta	(Individual Neutral Athletes) Angelina Melnikova	(United States) Leanne Wong	(China) Zhang Qingying
2026	(Netherlands) Rotterdam	(United States) Skye Blakely	(Russia) Lyudmila Roshchina^{[c]}	(China) Ke Qinqin

== All-time medal count ==
Last updated after the 2026 World Championships.

Rank	Nation	Gold	Silver	Bronze	Total
1	United States	15	9	5	29
2	Soviet Union	12	8	6	26
3	Russia ^{[c]}	4	4	6	14
4	Czechoslovakia	3	4	1	8
5	Romania	2	5	8	15
6	Brazil	1	1	1	3
6	Ukraine	1	1	1	3
8	Poland	1	0	2	3
9	Italy	1	0	1	2
10	Russian Gymnastics Federation ^{[b]}	1	0	0	1
–	Individual Neutral Athletes ^{[c]}	1	0	0	1
11	China	0	2	4	6
12	East Germany	0	2	2	4
13	Japan	0	1	2	3
14	Canada	0	1	0	1
14	Hungary	0	1	0	1
14	Sweden	0	1	0	1
17	Australia	0	0	1	1
17	Austria	0	0	1	1
17	Great Britain	0	0	1	1
Totals (19 entries)		42	40	42	124

Notes

- ^[a] At the 2021 World Artistic Gymnastics Championships in Kitakyushu, Japan, in accordance with a ban by the World Anti-Doping Agency (WADA) and a decision by the Court of Arbitration for Sport (CAS), athletes from Russia were not permitted to use the Russian name, flag, or anthem. They instead participated under name and flag of the RGF (Russian Gymnastics Federation).
- ^[b] At the 2025 World Artistic Gymnastics Championships in Jakarta, Indonesia, in accordance with sanctions imposed following by the 2022 Russian invasion of Ukraine, athletes from Russia were not permitted to use the name, flag, or anthem of Russia. They instead participated as "Individual Neutral Athletes (AIN)", their medals were not included in the official medal table.
- ^[c] At the 2026 World Artistic Gymnastics Championships in Rotterdam, the Netherlands, Russia competed under the name "World Gymnastics 2" (WG2) due to regulations by the Dutch authorities. World Gymnastics still credit medals earned by Russian athletes at these championships as medals for Russia.

== Multiple medalists ==
Rank	Gymnast	Nation	Years	Gold	Silver	Bronze	Total
1	Simone Biles	United States	2013–2023	6	0	0	6
2	Svetlana Khorkina	Russia	1995–2003	3	1	0	4
3	Angelina Melnikova	Russia; Russian Gymnastics Federation; Individual Neutral Athletes	2019–2025	2	0	1	3
4	Vlasta Děkanová	Czechoslovakia	1934–1938	2	0	0	2
4	Larisa Latynina	Soviet Union	1958–1962	2	0	0	2
4	Shannon Miller	United States	1993–1994	2	0	0	2
4	Ludmilla Tourischeva	Soviet Union	1970–1974	2	0	0	2
8	Rebeca Andrade	Brazil	2022–2023	1	1	0	2
8	Svetlana Boginskaya	Soviet Union	1989–1991	1	1	0	2
8	Věra Čáslavská	Czechoslovakia	1962–1966	1	1	0	2
8	Nellie Kim	Soviet Union	1978–1979	1	1	0	2
8	Yelena Shushunova	Soviet Union	1985–1987	1	1	0	2
13	Vanessa Ferrari	Italy	2006–2007	1	0	1	2
13	Morgan Hurd	United States	2017–2018	1	0	1	2
13	Aliya Mustafina	Russia	2010–2013	1	0	1	2
13	Helena Rakoczy	Poland	1950–1954	1	0	1	2
17	Eva Bosáková	Czechoslovakia	2006–2007	0	2	0	2
17	Leanne Wong	United States	2021–2025	0	2	0	2
19	Rebecca Bross	United States	2009–2010	0	1	1	2
19	Larisa Iordache	Romania	2014–2015	0	1	1	2
19	Shilese Jones	United States	2022–2023	0	1	1	2
19	Lavinia Miloșovici	Romania	1994–1995	0	1	1	2
19	Kyla Ross	United States	2013–2014	0	1	1	2
