= Zdeňka Veřmiřovská =

Czech gymnast

Personal information
- Born: 27 June 1913 Kopřivnice, Moravia, Austria-Hungary
- Died: 13 May 1997 (aged 83) Prague, Czech Republic

Gymnastics career
- Discipline: Women's artistic gymnastics
- Country represented: Czechoslovakia
Medal record
Representing Czechoslovakia
Olympic Games
| Gold medal – first place | 1948 London | Team |
| Silver medal – second place | 1936 Berlin | Team |
World Championships
| Gold medal – first place | 1934 Budapest | Team |
| Gold medal – first place | 1938 Prague | Team |
| Silver medal – second place | 1938 Prague | All-around |
| Silver medal – second place | 1938 Prague | Uneven Bars |

Zdeňka Veřmiřovská (Czech pronunciation: [ˈzdɛɲka ˈvɛr̝mɪr̝ofskaː]; 27 June 1913 – 13 May 1997) was a Czech gymnast. She represented Czechoslovakia in the 1936 Summer Olympics receiving silver in the team event, and in the 1948 Summer Olympics winning gold in the team event. She was born on 27 June 1913 in Kopřivnice and died on 13 May 1997 in Prague.

== Competitive gymnastics career ==
Veřmiřovská's competitive career in the sporting record extends to at least as far back at the 9th Prague Slet in 1932. An event that occurred on the 100th anniversary of the birth of Miroslav Tyrš, held on 12–29 June and 2–6 July, this was a monumental festival with “180,000 spectators…130,000 gymnasts…[a] parade with 65,000 marchers…[and] advanced gymnastic skills” that registered, over the week-long event, “a million spectators”. In the competitive advanced gymnastics segment of this festival, as one of 7 Czechoslovak entrants, 4 Yugoslavian entrants, and 4 Sokol entrants from the USA, she finished immediately outside of the medal positions - her teammate, eventual first-ever (1934) and successfully-defending (1938) World All-Around Champion in the sport of artistic gymnastics, Vlasta Děkanová, with 1019 points (or 88.6% of the total maximum of 1150 points) was the champion, and rounding out the medal positions ahead of Veřmiřovská, herself, were her and Děkanová's Czechoslovak World Championships (1934) and Olympics (1936) teammate, Anna Hřebřinová, with 933 points (81.13%), and Yugoslavia's Vera Kovač with 857 points (74.52%). Veřmiřovská, herself, was 4th with 844 points (73.39%).

She was a long-time mainstay of the Czechoslovak women's gymnastics team, helping her team to gold at the inaugural World Championships for women in 1934. She demonstrated consistent excellence by helping her team successfully defend their world team champion status at the next World Championships in 1938. She showed enough tenacity to persevere and help her team to gold again, a whole 14 years after initially helping them to their first world team title, at the 1948 London Summer Olympics, despite weathering the disappointment she and her teammates sustained when they lost the team title to the German team at the 1936 Berlin Summer Olympics.

An exceptionally good competitor on balance beam, at the 1936 Summer Olympics, Veřmiřovská logged the competition's second-highest optional balance beam exercise score of 14.10, tied with Germany's Erna Bürger, and only behind top-scorer Gabriella Mészáros of Hungary. Her combined compulsory and optional exercise total of 23.10 on this apparatus was second outright, behind, again, only Mészáros. At the 1948 London Summer Olympics, she performed even more brilliantly in her voluntary exercise on this apparatus, garnering a first-place finish for that part of the competition.

A virtuoso who excelled in the all-around combined exercises, at the first-ever world championships for women in 1934, where individual and team placements were decided not only by gymnastics events, but also athletics events, in the gymnastics-events-only segment of the competition, Veřmiřovská logged the 2nd-highest total of 30.85, ahead of even her teammate Děkanová, and just behind Judit Tóth of Hungary. (The scores in the athletics events, combined with the gymnastics events, where Děkanová was one of only 4 competitors to score the maximum of 20 points, meant that Děkanová was the highest overall-finisher at those games, whereas Veřmiřovská finished 5th.) Veřmiřovská actually repeated the feat of defeating Děkanová in select combined standings when, incredibly, both still competing after World War II, they were the top 2 competitors at a domestic (Czechoslovak) gymnastics competition held on 6 October 1946. Dozens of participants competed, including 3 individuals who were on the Olympic team less than 2 years later: Miloslava Misáková, Olga Šilhánová, and Věra Růžičková, all outscored by many percentage points by both Veřmiřovská and Děkanová who were in a class by themselves, despite both being well into their thirties. Veřmiřovská scored 67.2 points, or 96% of the maximum possible score of 70, while Děkanová placed 2nd with 66.7 points, at 95.28% of the maximum possible score. The next-highest competitor was Božena Kalová who scored a full 5 percentage points lower than Děkanová. The majority of the other gymnasts scored under 76% of the maximum possible score.

Veřmiřovská achieved what was probably her greatest individual accolade in her competitive career at the 1938 World Championships where she won the silver medal in the All-Around just behind her teammate Děkanová who successfully defended her 1st-place finish from the immediately previous worlds in 1934. Additionally, she had a high placement of 7th in the individual standings at the 1936 Olympics.
