= Guyatt =

Guyatt is a surname. Notable people with this surname include:

- Gordon Guyatt (born 1953), Canadian physician and professor
- Jim Guyatt (1939–1996), Australian rules footballer
- Nicholas Guyatt (born 1973), British historian, author and lecturer
- Owen Guyatt (1921–1991), Australian rules footballer
- Richard Guyatt (1914–2007), British designer and professor
- Tess Guyatt (born 1991), Canadian curler

== Other ==
- Guyatt Park ferry wharf, Brisbane, Australia
- Guyatt Ridge, in Antarctica, named after Malcolm J. Guyatt

== See also ==
- Gyatt
- USS Gyatt, a US Navy destroyer converted into the first guided missile destroyer
