= Harold LeBruce Gilmore =

American politician

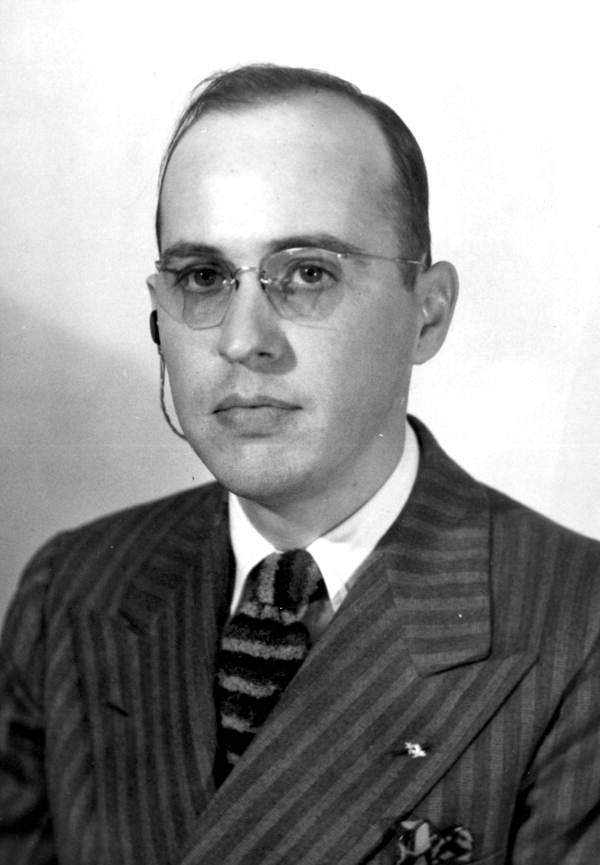
- Gilmore in 1945

Member of the Florida House of Representatives from Suwannee County
- In office 1945–1949 Serving with Thomas Albert Delegal
- Preceded by: G. Warren "Bobby" Sanchez
- Succeeded by: William Randall Slaughter

Personal details
- Born: 1912 Charleston, South Carolina, U.S.
- Died: July 5, 1996 (aged 84)
- Party: Democratic
- Children: 1

Harold LeBruce Gilmore (1912 – July 5, 1996) was an American politician. He served as a Democratic member of the Florida House of Representatives.

== Life and career ==
Gilmore was born in Charleston, South Carolina. He moved to Live Oak, Florida in 1932. Gilmore established the company Huffman and Gilmore. He was a member of the Shriners Morocco Temple. Gilmore was also a member of the American Radio Relay League.

In 1945, he was elected to the Florida House of Representatives, Gilmore succeeding G. Warren "Bobby" Sanchez. In 1949, he was succeeded by William Randall Slaughter.

Gilmore died in July 1996 of cancer, at the age of 84. He was buried in Live Oak Cemetery.
