= Konrad Frey =

German gymnast

- Born: 24 April 1909 Bad Kreuznach, German Empire
- Died: 24 May 1974 (aged 65)

Gymnastics career
- Discipline: Men's artistic gymnastics
- Country represented: Germany
Medal record
Men's artistic gymnastics
Representing Germany
Olympic Games
Gold medal – first place	1936 Berlin	Men's parallel bars
Gold medal – first place	1936 Berlin	Men's pommel horse
Gold medal – first place	1936 Berlin	Men's team competition
Silver medal – second place	1936 Berlin	Men's horizontal bar
Bronze medal – third place	1936 Berlin	Men's floor exercises
Bronze medal – third place	1936 Berlin	Men's individual all-round
World Championships
Bronze medal – third place	1934 Budapest	Team

Konrad Frey (24 April 1909 in Bad Kreuznach – 24 May 1974 ib.) was a German gymnast best known to be the most successful German male competitor at a single Olympics.

With 3 Gold and 6 medals in total at the 1936 Summer Olympics, he had beaten teammate Alfred Schwarzmann by one Silver for the honours of becoming the most successful competitor in terms of total medals won, and the most successful competitor of host nation Germany. American Jesse Owens scored four medals, but all of them were gold.

In 1932, 1935 and 1937, Konrad Frey became German Champion in Men's individual all-round. After World War II, he worked again as a teacher.

== See also ==
- List of multiple Olympic medalists at a single Games
