= 1934 World Artistic Gymnastics Championships =

Gymnastics competition

- Location: Budapest, Hungary

The victorious first-ever Women's World Championship team, from Czechoslovakia, at these 1934 games. Their Czechoslovak male counterparts, and their nation-state team predecessors, the Bohemians, were team champions at 9 of the 11 editions of these World Championships that had team competitions and that existed from their debut at the 3rd 1907 games to the 11th and last games, in 1938, before World War II. Upon the debut of the competitive women's program at these games, this women's team mirrored their male countrymen's successes and, as a team, successfully defended their title at the next World Championships in 1938, as well as at the 1948 London Summer Olympics (at the 1936 Berlin Olympics, they placed second). Standing, left to right: Jaroslava Štětková (coach), Vlasta Jarůšková, Jaroslava Bajerová, Nora Hájková, Milena Šebková, Anna Hřebřinová, repeat World All-Around Champion Vlasta Děkanová, Vlasta Foltová, Zdeňka Veřmiřovská. Děkanová and Veřmiřovská co-anchored the team and were the longest-term mainstays of the team.

The 10th Artistic Gymnastics World Championships were held in Budapest, Hungary, in conjunction with the 50th anniversary of the founding of the Hungarian Gymnastics Federation, on June 1–2, 1934.

It was the first World Championships with a women's segment to the competition.

It was also the first world championships at which individual medals for apparatus were given.

Conversely, contemporaneous, detailed coverage – beyond merely team totals – of select World Championships prior to World War I exists both in the pages of “Slovenski Sokol” magazine (via the Digital Library of Slovenia) and in reproductions of apparently original and contemporaneous Czech source materials (via Gymnastics-History.com) for both the 3rd (1907) and 6th (1913) editions of the World Championships. In the Czech versions of those sources, reproduced by Gymnastics-History.com, both individual all-around scores and apparatus scores are presented for every competitor, and in the Slovenian versions of those sources, individual all-around scores and rankings are reproduced for the top 14 and very last-place competitor for the 1907 Worlds and for every competitor at the 1913 Worlds. Additionally, all of the data that is presented in each of those sources completely matches the data that both the FIG and USAG (the official governing body of the sport of Artistic gymnastics within the USA) present in their respective treatments on the results of these pre-WWI World Championships, with the sole two exceptions of the horizontal bar placing of French Gymnast Francois Vidal and the parallel bars placement of Belgian gymnast Paul Mangin, both at the 1907 World Championships.

Additionally, please note that in lieu of an article published in the 10 June 2024 issue of The International Journal of the History of Sport (a peer-reviewed journal) claiming that the BFEG's (the FIG's predecessor) archives from before 1950 appear to have been lost, a pictoral presentation of multiple medals belonging to 1911 World All-Around Champion Ferdinand Steiner on the website of his school shows medals, not only the team gold he won at that competition, that read “Concorso Ginnastico Internazionale 1911 Torino”. That pictoral presentation of Steiner's medals helps suggest that individual medals were awarded for those 1911 World Championships as they were from the same locale and year as the 1911 Worlds, and with the original title of the competition being printed on those medals, this further helps suggest that these individual medals were rewarded contemporaneously.

== Medals ==
Rank	Nation	Gold	Silver	Bronze	Total
1	Switzerland (SUI)	6	6	1	13
2	Czechoslovakia (TCH)	3	1	3	7
3	Germany (GER)	1	1	2	4
4	Hungary (HUN)	0	2	0	2
5	Italy (ITA)	0	1	1	2
6	Poland (POL)	0	0	2	2
7	Luxembourg (LUX)	0	0	1	1
Totals (7 entries)		10	11	10	31

== Men ==
=== Team final ===
Medal	Country	Points
Gold medal	Switzerland	787.30
Silver medal	Czechoslovakia	772.90
Bronze medal	Germany	769.50
4	Italy	761.35
5	Hungary	757.40
6	Finland	754.10
7	France	730.40
8	Luxembourg	623.10
9	Belgium	595.35
10	Poland	589.80
11	Netherlands	585.80
12	Bulgaria	555.30
13	Mexico	427.15

=== All-around ===
Medal	Country	Gymnast	Points
Gold medal	Switzerland	Eugen Mack	138.95
Silver medal	Italy	Romeo Neri	137.75
Bronze medal	Czechoslovakia	Emanuel Löffler	136.15
4	Finland	Heikki Savolainen	135.75
5	Czechoslovakia	Jan Sládek	134.90
6	Czechoslovakia	Jan Gajdoš	133.15
7	Switzerland	Georges Miez	132.45
8	Finland	Martti Uosikkinen	131.95
9 (tie)	Hungary	József Sarlós	131.90
9 (tie)	East Germany	Ernst Winter	131.90
11	East Germany	Franz Beckert	131.85
12	Switzerland	Josef Walter	130.95

=== Apparatus ===
==== Floor exercise ====
Medal	Country	Gymnast	Points
Gold medal	Switzerland	Georges Miez	18.95
Silver medal	Switzerland	Eugen Mack	18.35
Bronze medal	Germany	Kurt Krötzsch	18.25
4	Switzerland	Josef Walter	18.10
5	Hungary	Lajos Tóth	18.05
6	Germany	Heinz Sandrock	18.10

==== Pommel horse ====
Medal	Country	Gymnast	Points
Gold medal	Switzerland	Eugen Mack	19.15
Silver medal	Switzerland	Eduard Steinemann	18.90
Bronze medal	Czechoslovakia	Jan Sládek	18.75
4	Italy	Omero Bonoli	18.70
5	Italy	Romeo Neri	18.60
6	Finland	Ilmari Pakarinen	18.10

==== Rings ====
Medal	Country	Gymnast	Points
Gold medal	Czechoslovakia	Alois Hudec	19.45
Silver medal	Switzerland	Eugen Mack	19.00
(tie)	Czechoslovakia	Jaroslav Kolinger	18.90
(tie)	Luxembourg	Mathias Logelin	18.90
5	Hungary	József Sarlós	18.75
6	Luxembourg	Jey Kugeler	18.70

==== Vault ====
Medal	Country	Gymnast	Points
Gold medal	Switzerland	Eugen Mack	20.00
Silver medal	Switzerland	Eduard Steinemann	19.40
Bronze medal	Czechoslovakia	Jan Sládek	19.20
4	Switzerland	Josef Walter	19.05
5	Italy	Savino Guglielmetti	19.00
6	Hungary	Lajos Tóth	18.95

==== Parallel bars ====
Medal	Country	Gymnast	Points
Gold medal	Switzerland	Eugen Mack	19.75
Silver medal	Switzerland	Josef Walter	19.25
Bronze medal	Switzerland	Walter Bach	19.20
4	Finland	Heikki Savolainen	18.90
5 (tie)	Italy	Romeo Neri	18.80
5 (tie)	Finland	Eino Tukiainen	18.80

==== Horizontal bar ====
Medal	Country	Gymnast	Points
Gold medal	Germany	Ernst Winter	19.65
Silver medal	Switzerland	Georges Miez	19.45
Silver medal	Germany	Heinz Sandrock	19.45
4	Switzerland	Eugen Mack	19.40
5	Finland	Heikki Savolainen	19.15
6 (tie)	Germany	Walter Steffens	19.10

- A few discrepancies exist in data for the results from these World Championships.

Due to the existence of those discrepancies, ultimately a later source, that claimed that those discrepancies were the results of computation errors and that was a more thorough source of information with better sourcing to original documents, was used for the results listed in this edit.

== Women ==
This first ever women's competition at a World Artistic Gymnastics Championships consisted of a competitive field including five countries and 40 individual competitors.

Rank	Nation	Gymnast	Individual results																		Group exercises								Final Team totals
Rank	Nation	Gymnast	Gymnastics events								Athletics events								Individual grand totals	Individual grand totals rank	Group exercises								Final Team totals
Rank	Nation	Gymnast	Balance beam	Beam rank	Bars*	Bars rank	Vault (gymnastics)	Vault rank	Gymnastics Events Totals	Gymnastics Events Totals Rank	60 meters	60 meters rank	Long jump	Long jump rank	Javelin	Javelin rank	Athletics totals	Athletics totals rank	Individual grand totals	Individual grand totals rank	Entrance	Preliminary Ensemble	Partner Exercises	Rhythmic or National Dance	Rest Exercises	Additional Exercises	Punctuality	Time Deductions	Final team totals
1st place, gold medalist(s)	Czechoslovakia	Vlasta Děkanová	9.07	6	13.05	9	8.16	5	30.28	3	10.00	1	10.00	1	10.00	1	30.00	1	60.28	1	6.46	38.53	23.39	42.18	8.93	111.20	180.00	-	738.06
1st place, gold medalist(s)	Czechoslovakia	Zdeňka Veřmiřovská	9.10	4	13.65	3	8.10	6	30.85	2	10.00	1	10.00	1	6.80	9	26.80	7	57.65	5	6.46	38.53	23.39	42.18	8.93	111.20	180.00	-	738.06
1st place, gold medalist(s)	Czechoslovakia	Vlasta Foltová	8.73	11	13.50	5	8.00	7	30.23	4	10.00	1	10.00	1	3.20	23	23.20	13	53.43	10	6.46	38.53	23.39	42.18	8.93	111.20	180.00	-	738.06
1st place, gold medalist(s)	Czechoslovakia	Nora Hájková	7.96	15	12.67	10	7.56	8	28.19	11	10.00	1	10.00	1	4.80	13	24.80	10	52.99	11	6.46	38.53	23.39	42.18	8.93	111.20	180.00	-	738.06
1st place, gold medalist(s)	Czechoslovakia	Jaroslava Bajerová	9.07	6	11.85	17	8.30	4	29.22	8	8.50	19	9.00	14	5.00	12	22.50	15	51.72	12	6.46	38.53	23.39	42.18	8.93	111.20	180.00	-	738.06
1st place, gold medalist(s)	Czechoslovakia	Vlasta Jarůšková	9.07	6	12.37	14	6.66	16	28.10	12	10.00	1	9.00	14	4.20	18	23.20	13	51.30	13	6.46	38.53	23.39	42.18	8.93	111.20	180.00	-	738.06
1st place, gold medalist(s)	Czechoslovakia	Milena Šebková	7.93	16	13.35	6	6.93	14	28.21	10	9.50	15	7.00	16	3.40	21	19.90	18	48.11	15	6.46	38.53	23.39	42.18	8.93	111.20	180.00	-	738.06
1st place, gold medalist(s)	Czechoslovakia	Anna Hřebřinová	7.86	18	5.15	38	6.66	16	19.67	26	10.00	1	10.00	1	8.40	5	28.40	5	48.07	16	6.46	38.53	23.39	42.18	8.93	111.20	180.00	-	738.06
1st place, gold medalist(s)	Czechoslovakia	Totals:	53.00	-	77.09	-	46.78	-	-	-	58.50	-	58.00	-	34.00	-	-	-	327.37		6.46	38.53	23.39	42.18	8.93	111.20	180.00	-	738.06
2nd place, silver medalist(s)	Hungary	Margit Kalocsai	9.10	4	12.15	16	8.33	3	29.58	6	10.00	1	10.00	1	10.00	1	30.00	1	59.58	2	7.83	35.98	22.99	39.66	7.66	102.79	180.00	-	734.40
2nd place, silver medalist(s)	Hungary	Anna Kael	6.66	23	12.60	11	8.83	2	28.09	13	10.00	1	10.00	1	10.00	1	30.00	1	58.09	4	7.83	35.98	22.99	39.66	7.66	102.79	180.00	-	734.40
2nd place, silver medalist(s)	Hungary	Lenke Balkanji	9.00	9	11.18	20	6.50	18	26.68	17	10.00	1	10.00	1	10.00	1	30.00	1	56.68	6	7.83	35.98	22.99	39.66	7.66	102.79	180.00	-	734.40
2nd place, silver medalist(s)	Hungary	Jenőné Varga	8.76	10	13.20	8	7.33	9	29.29	7	10.00	1	10.00	1	5.800	11	25.80	9	55.09	7	7.83	35.98	22.99	39.66	7.66	102.79	180.00	-	734.40
2nd place, silver medalist(s)	Hungary	Judit Tóth	9.20	3	13.65	3	9.33	1	32.18	1	9.50	15	10.00	1	2.60	24	22.10	16	54.28	8	7.83	35.98	22.99	39.66	7.66	102.79	180.00	-	734.40
2nd place, silver medalist(s)	Hungary	Mária Munkácsi	8.50	13	11.70	18	7.17	12	27.37	15	10.00	1	10.00	1	6.40	10	26.40	8	53.77	9	7.83	35.98	22.99	39.66	7.66	102.79	180.00	-	734.40
2nd place, silver medalist(s)	Hungary	?? Kemenes	8.36	14	11.10	21	7.33	9	26.79	16	8.50	19	7.00	16	8.00	6	23.50	12	50.29	14	7.83	35.98	22.99	39.66	7.66	102.79	180.00	-	734.40
2nd place, silver medalist(s)	Hungary	Gabriella Mészáros	9.60	1	11.55	19	7.33	9	28.48	9	8.50	19	3.00	26	4.80	13	16.30	20	44.78	18	7.83	35.98	22.99	39.66	7.66	102.79	180.00	-	734.40
2nd place, silver medalist(s)	Hungary	Totals:	51.22	-	74.48	-	47.49	-	-	-	59.50	-	60.00	-	44.80	-	-	-	337.49		7.83	35.98	22.99	39.66	7.66	102.79	180.00	-	734.40
3rd place, bronze medalist(s)	Poland	Janina Skirlińska	9.23	2	13.35	6	7.07	13	29.65	5	10.00	1	10.00	1	8.00	6	28.00	6	58.65	3	7.60	35.24	21.17	31.79	7.06	87.99	180.00	-	629.48
3rd place, bronze medalist(s)	Poland	?? Pawłowska	7.77	19	9.15	29	5.67	23	22.59	23	10.00	1	10.00	1	4.80	13	24.80	11	47.39	17	7.60	35.24	21.17	31.79	7.06	87.99	180.00	-	629.48
3rd place, bronze medalist(s)	Poland	?? Dylewska	7.06	22	12.23	15	6.37	20	25.66	18	7.00	23	5.00	20	2.60	24	14.60	21	40.26	18	7.60	35.24	21.17	31.79	7.06	87.99	180.00	-	629.48
3rd place, bronze medalist(s)	Poland	?? Szymowa	4.77	33	12.45	13	6.40	19	23.62	21	5.50	32	3.00	26	8.00	6	16.50	19	40.12	20	7.60	35.24	21.17	31.79	7.06	87.99	180.00	-	629.48
3rd place, bronze medalist(s)	Poland	Klara Sierońska	7.93	16	13.95	1	6.13	22	28.01	14	6.00	28	0.00	33	3.60	19	9.60	28	37.61	22	7.60	35.24	21.17	31.79	7.06	87.99	180.00	-	629.48
3rd place, bronze medalist(s)	Poland	?? Mikulska	7.60	20	12.60	11	5.00	29	25.20	19	6.00	28	0.00	33	3.40	21	9.40	29	34.60	23	7.60	35.24	21.17	31.79	7.06	87.99	180.00	-	629.48
3rd place, bronze medalist(s)	Poland	?? Lubańska	8.60	12	9.60	24	4.67	34	22.87	22	7.00	23	0.00	33	3.60	19	10.60	27	33.47	24	7.60	35.24	21.17	31.79	7.06	87.99	180.00	-	629.48
3rd place, bronze medalist(s)	Poland	?? Wisłocka	5.40	25	13.88	2	5.50	24	24.78	20	3.50	36	0.00	33	4.60	16	8.10	30	32.88	25	7.60	35.24	21.17	31.79	7.06	87.99	180.00	-	629.48
3rd place, bronze medalist(s)	Poland	Totals:	44.36	-	73.73	-	36.64	-	-	-	44.50	-	28.00	-	30.40	-	-	-	258.63		7.60	35.24	21.17	31.79	7.06	87.99	180.00	-	629.48
4	France	?? Ramos	5.06	28	9.07	31	4.33	35	18.46	33	10.00	1	6.00	19	4.40	17	20.40	17	38.86	21	8.30	35.84	19.39	26.65	4.33	75.33	180.00	(15.00)	521.31
4	France	?? Esposito	3.00	39	9.30	27	4.96	32	17.26	36	8.50	19	5.00	20	1.00	28	14.50	22	31.76	26	8.30	35.84	19.39	26.65	4.33	75.33	180.00	(15.00)	521.31
4	France	?? Montané	5.96	24	9.22	28	3.66	39	18.84	30	6.00	28	4.00	23	1.80	26	11.80	25	30.64	27	8.30	35.84	19.39	26.65	4.33	75.33	180.00	(15.00)	521.31
4	France	?? Paon	3.86	36	8.92	33	4.26	37	17.04	37	9.00	18	4.00	23	0.20	29	13.20	23	30.24	28	8.30	35.84	19.39	26.65	4.33	75.33	180.00	(15.00)	521.31
4	France	?? Tarillon	1.93	40	9.90	23	5.50	24	17.33	35	9.50	15	2.00	28	0.00	30	11.50	26	28.83	30	8.30	35.84	19.39	26.65	4.33	75.33	180.00	(15.00)	521.31
4	France	?? Bourrier	5.36	26	9.45	26	4.33	35	19.14	28	7.00	23	0.00	33	0.00	30	7.00	34	26.14	34	8.30	35.84	19.39	26.65	4.33	75.33	180.00	(15.00)	521.31
4	France	?? Allain	3.80	37	8.85	34	3.33	40	15.98	38	4.00	35	1.00	32	0.00	30	5.00	37	20.98	38	8.30	35.84	19.39	26.65	4.33	75.33	180.00	(15.00)	521.31
4	France	?? Guenerin	3.50	38	9.00	32	5.00	29	17.50	34	0.00	40	0.00	33	0.00	30	0.00	40	17.50	39	8.30	35.84	19.39	26.65	4.33	75.33	180.00	(15.00)	521.31
4	France	Totals:	25.17	-	55.86	-	27.04	-	-	-	50.00	-	21.00	-	7.40	-	-	-	186.47		8.30	35.84	19.39	26.65	4.33	75.33	180.00	(15.00)	521.31
5	Bulgaria	?? Taraktsien	7.60	20	8.55	36	5.33	28	21.48	24	6.00	28	2.00	28	0.00	30	8.00	31	29.48	29	6.60	30.06	15.49	21.24	0.00	69.39	180.00		481.16
5	Bulgaria	?? Makedonska	4.83	30	3.75	39	6.36	21	14.94	39	7.00	23	5.00	20	0.00	30	12.00	24	26.94	31	6.60	30.06	15.49	21.24	0.00	69.39	180.00		481.16
5	Bulgaria	?? Kraeva	4.16	35	10.12	22	5.00	29	19.28	27	5.50	32	2.00	28	0.00	30	7.50	32	26.78	32	6.60	30.06	15.49	21.24	0.00	69.39	180.00		481.16
5	Bulgaria	?? Parova	5.23	27	9.15	29	4.26	37	18.64	32	3.50	36	4.00	23	0.00	30	7.50	32	26.14	33	6.60	30.06	15.49	21.24	0.00	69.39	180.00		481.16
5	Bulgaria	?? Antipova	4.63	34	8.77	35	5.33	27	18.73	31	7.00	23	0.00	33	0.00	30	7.00	34	25.73	35	6.60	30.06	15.49	21.24	0.00	69.39	180.00		481.16
5	Bulgaria	?? Gatcseva	4.83	30	7.35	37	6.73	15	18.91	29	3.00	38	0.00	33	1.40	27	4.40	38	23.31	36	6.60	30.06	15.49	21.24	0.00	69.39	180.00		481.16
5	Bulgaria	?? Kazandjeva	4.93	29	9.60	24	5.40	26	19.93	25	1.50	39	0.00	33	0.00	30	1.50	39	21.43	37	6.60	30.06	15.49	21.24	0.00	69.39	180.00		481.16
5	Bulgaria	?? Barcowa	4.80	32	0.00	40	4.86	33	9.66	40	5.00	34	2.00	28	0.00	30	7.00	34	16.66	40	6.60	30.06	15.49	21.24	0.00	69.39	180.00		481.16
5	Bulgaria	Totals:	31.28	-	47.69	-	33.01	-	-	-	32.00	-	13.00	-	1.40	-	-	-	158.38		6.60	30.06	15.49	21.24	0.00	69.39	180.00		481.16

- = Some teams competed on the parallel bars whereas others competed on the uneven bars.

• The scores of the two lowest overall scorers from each team were dropped from each event to arrive at the team total for each event.
