= Hénon =

Hénon may refer to:

- Hénon, Côtes-d'Armor, France
- Michel Hénon (1931–2013), French mathematician
- Hénon map, a chaotic dynamical system introduced by Michel Hénon
- Guy Hénon (1912–?), French field hockey player
- Jacques-Louis Hénon (1802–1872), French republican politician
