= Nebojša Atanacković =

Serbian politician (born 1943)

Nebojša Atanacković (Serbian Cyrillic: Небојша Атанацковић; born 23 December 1943), also known as Boban Atanacković, is an entrepreneur and former politician from Serbia. He was a member of the National Assembly of Serbia from 1993 to 2001, and served as mayor of the Belgrade municipality of Voždovac from 1997 to 2000. For most of his time as an elected official, he was a member of the Serbian Renewal Movement (Srpski pokret obnove, SPO). He has been a prominent member of the Union of Employers of Serbia (Unije Poslodavaca Srbije, UPS) for many years and is currently its honorary president.

== Early life and career ==
Atanacković was born in Belgrade during the regime of Milan Nedić and raised in the city when it was the capital of the People's Republic of Serbia and the Federal People's Republic of Yugoslavia. He graduated from Belgrade's Faculty of Transportation and founded the Centar Boban auto centre in 1981. He subsequently founded the UPS in 1994 and served on the Yugoslavian Chamber of Commerce's Oil Trade Council.

Atanacković was also a champion auto racer in Serbia before entering political life.

== Politician ==
Atanacković joined the SPO on its founding in 1990, and was the party's candidate for Stari Grad's first division in the 1990 Serbian parliamentary election. He was defeated by future Yugoslavian president Vojislav Koštunica, who was at the time a member of the Democratic Party (Demokratska stranka, DS).

Serbia adopted a system of proportional representation for parliamentary elections in 1992; one-third of parliamentary mandates were assigned to candidates from successful lists in numerical order, while the remaining two-thirds were distributed amongst other candidates at the discretion of the sponsoring parties and coalitions. In the same year, the SPO founded the Democratic Movement of Serbia (Demokratski pokret Srbije, DEPOS) in an attempt to create a united opposition to Slobodan Milošević's administration. Atanacković was given the fourteenth position on the DEPOS's electoral list in Belgrade in the 1992 parliamentary election and was granted an optional mandate when the list won fifteen seats in the division. He took his seat when the assembly met in January 1993. Milošević's Socialist Party of Serbia (Socijalistička partija Srbije, SPS) won a minority government in the election and remained in power via an informal alliance with the far-right Serbian Radical Party (Srpska radikalna stranka, SRS). The DEPOS members served in opposition.

The SPS–SRS alliance broke down in 1993, and a new parliamentary election was held later in the year. Atanacković appeared in the sixteenth position on the DEPOS list in Belgrade and was once again awarded an optional mandate when the list won eleven seats. The SPS again won a minority government and was able to form a stable administration via an alliance with New Democracy (Nova demokratija, ND), hitherto one of the parties in the DEPOS coalition (which dissolved soon after the election). The SPO members again served in opposition.

The SPO and DS subsequently formed an alliance called Zajedno and contested the 1996 Serbian local elections under its banner. The alliance won victories in several major cities, including Belgrade, but the results were not initially recognized by the Serbian government. Following an extended standoff and several weeks of protest, the government belatedly recognized the victories of Zajedno in February 1997. Atanacković was elected to both the City Assembly of Belgrade and the Municipal Assembly of Voždovac. When the latter assembly convened in early 1997, he was chosen as its president, which was at the time equivalent to mayor.

The SPO left the Zajedno alliance later in 1997 and contested that year's parliamentary election on its own. Atanacković was given the second position on the SPO's list in the restructured Voždovac division and was given an optional mandate when the list won three seats in the division. Once again, the SPS and its allies won the election and the SPO served in opposition.

The SPO briefly aligned itself with the SPS at the federal level in Yugoslavia in January 1999, before returning to an oppositional stance toward the Milošević administration in April. In October of the same year, four associates of SPO leader Vuk Drašković were killed and Drašković was himself injured in a suspicious car crash that many considered an assassination attempt. As a traffic safety expert, Atanacković expressed scepticism about the official investigation into the matter.

In 2000, most of Serbia's leading opposition parties apart from the SPO formed the Democratic Opposition of Serbia (DOS), which emerged victorious in the 2000 Yugoslavian general election. The SPO, which fielded its own list, fared poorly. Atanacković was defeated in his bid for re-election to the Belgrade assembly in the concurrent 2000 Serbian local elections; he was also not re-elected to the Voždovac assembly. He resigned from the SPO in October 2000 and was not a candidate in the subsequent 2000 Serbian parliamentary election, held in December. His term in the national assembly ended when the new parliament convened in January 2001.

== Since 2000 ==
Atanacković has held a variety of leadership roles in the UPS since 2000 and has often been a public spokesperson for the organization. In 2001, he presented a draft proposal of an anti-corruption bill to Serbia's new government. The following year, he represented the UPS in signing an accord with the Serbian government and Serbia's largest unions on the nature of the country's economic transformation.

In 2014, he called on Željko Sertić, Serbia's new economy minister, to crack down on the country's oversized grey economy. Two years later, he encouraged the Serbian government not to give in to the government of Kosovo over an oil blockade imposed by the disputed territory.

Acting as the UPS's honorary president, he welcomed assistance measures from the Serbian government for businesses and citizens in 2021 as a means of avoiding large-scale layoffs.

As of 2021, Atanacković is a frequent commentator on economic matters in the Serbian media. In August 2021, he argued that Serbian employers supported the principle of an increase in the minimum wage, although he described the rate being proposed by the government as unsustainable.

== Electoral record ==
=== Local (City Assembly of Belgrade) ===
2000 City of Belgrade election Voždovac Division III
Nebojša Atanacković (incumbent)	Serbian Renewal Movement	
Zoran Višnijć	Socialist Party of Serbia–Yugoslav Left	
Srđan Popovac	Democratic Opposition of Serbia	Elected
Milan Cvjetić	Serbian Radical Party	

=== National Assembly of Serbia ===
1990 Serbian parliamentary election Member for Stari Grad I
Vladimir Ajdačić	Green Party	
Nebojša Atanacković	Serbian Renewal Movement	
Dragomir Antonić	Citizens' Group	
Nenad Davidović	Association for the Yugoslav Democratic Initiative	
Miodrag Đurišić	Party of Independent Businessmen and Peasants	
Petar Džadžić	Socialist Party of Serbia	
Jugoslava Kostić – Paunić	Serbian National Renewal	
Vojislav Koštunica	Democratic Party	Elected
Miroljub Pavlović	People's Radical Party	
Dušan Trifunović	Citizens' Group	
