= John Govan =

John Govan may refer to:

- John Govan (cricketer), Australian cricketer
- John George Govan, Scottish businessman and evangelist
