= Ernst Winter =

German gymnast (1907–1943)

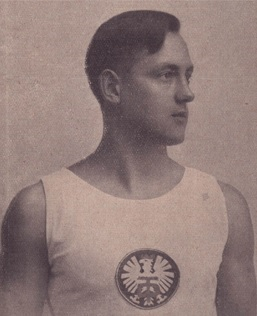

Personal information
- Born: 30 October 1907
- Died: 1943 (aged 35–36)

Gymnastics career
- Discipline: Men's artistic gymnastics
- Country represented: Germany
Medal record
Men's artistic gymnastics
Olympic Games
Gold medal – first place	1936 Berlin	Men's team all-around
World Championships
Gold medal – first place	1934 Budapest	Horizontal bar

Ernst Winter (30 October 1907 – 1943) was a German artistic gymnast. He represented Eintracht Frankfurt gymnastics club.

He competed in one Olympic Games and one World Championships for Germany. He competed in the 1936 Summer Olympics, where Germany won a team gold. He did not win any individual medals, and his 17th in the pommel horse and 19th in the free exercise were his best results. He came 58th overall.

Winter won two medals at the 1934 World Championships, bronze in the team competition and gold on the parallel bars apparatus.

At the national level, he finished second five times at the German Championships from 1931 to 1935.

He died in a prison of war camp during World War II.

== See also ==
- Gymnastics at the 1936 Summer Olympics
