= Eduard Steinemann =

Swiss gymnast

- Born: 2 August 1906
- Died: 28 June 1937 (aged 30)

Gymnastics career
- Discipline: Men's artistic gymnastics
- Country represented: Switzerland
Medal record
Men's Gymnastics
Representing Switzerland
Gold medal – first place	1928 Amsterdam	Team
Silver medal – second place	1936 Berlin	Team
World Championships
Gold medal – first place	1934 Budapest	Team
Silver medal – second place	1934 Budapest	Pommel Horse
Silver medal – second place	1934 Budapest	Vault

Eduard Steinemann (2 August 1906 – 28 June 1937) was a Swiss gymnast who competed in the 1928 Summer Olympics and in the 1936 Summer Olympics. Additionally, he competed at the 1934 World Artistic Gymnastics Championships where he helped his team to the gold medal and won individual silver medals on both pommel horse and vault.
