= Josef Walter =

Swiss gymnast

- Born: 1 December 1901
- Died: July, 1973

Gymnastics career
- Discipline: Men's artistic gymnastics
- Country represented: Switzerland
Medal record
Olympic Games
Silver medal – second place	1936 Berlin	Floor exercise
Silver medal – second place	1936 Berlin	Team all-around
World Championships
Gold medal – first place	1934 Budapest	Team
Silver medal – second place	1934 Budapest	Parallel bars

Josef Walter (1 December 1901 – July 1973) was a Swiss gymnast and Olympic medalist. He competed at the 1936 Summer Olympics in Berlin where he received a silver medal in floor exercise. He was among the non-scoring members of the Swiss team that won silver medals in the team all-around event at the 1936 Olympics. (Teams had eight members, and the six best scores counted in the team competition). Additionally, he competed at the 1934 World Artistic Gymnastics Championships, where he helped his Swiss team to the gold medal, also winning individual silver on the parallel bars apparatus.
