= Wushu at the Summer Olympics =

- IOC Code: WSU
- Governing body: IWUF
- Events: 15 (men: 8; women: 7)

Summer Olympics
- 1896; 1900; 1904; 1908; 1912; 1920; 1924; 1928; 1932; 1936; 1948; 1952; 1956; 1960; 1964; 1968; 1972; 1976; 1980; 1984; 1988; 1992; 1996; 2000; 2004; 2008; 2012; 2016; 2020; 2024; 2028; 2032; Note: demonstration or exhibition sport years indicated in italics
- Medalists

Wushu has appeared twice at the Summer Olympics as an unofficial exhibition event: in 1936 and 2008.

== 1936 ==
In 1936, Wushu was exhibited by a team of Chinese athletes at the Olympics in Berlin. In the Official Report of the Games, wushu was called "Chinese Boxing", and was categorized as a national gymnastics demonstration. The demonstration was held on August 11.

== 2008 ==
In 2008, a wushu tournament was allowed to be held in parallel to the Olympic Games in Beijing. Medals were awarded, though it was not considered an official demonstration sport.
