= Jim Forbes (footballer) =

Australian rules footballer, born 1908

Personal information
- Full name: Jim Forbes
- Born: 30 November 1908
- Died: 23 July 1996 (aged 87)
- Original team: Mentone

Playing career^{1}
Years	Club	Games (Goals)
1929	South Melbourne	1 (0)
- ^{1} Playing statistics correct to the end of 1929.

Jim Forbes (30 November 1908 – 23 July 1996) was an Australian rules footballer who played with South Melbourne in the Victorian Football League (VFL).
