= Gymnastics at the 1936 Summer Olympics =

Gymnastics at the Games of the XI Olympiad
- Venue: Dietrich Eckart Open-Air Theatre
- Dates: 10–12 August 1936

At the 1936 Summer Olympics in Berlin, nine events in gymnastics were contested. The competitions were held from 10 August 1936 to 12 August 1936.

== Medal table ==
Rank	Nation	Gold	Silver	Bronze	Total
1	Germany	6	1	6	13
2	Switzerland	1	6	2	9
3	Czechoslovakia	1	1	0	2
4	Finland	1	0	1	2
5	Yugoslavia	0	1	0	1
6	Hungary	0	0	1	1
Totals (6 entries)		9	9	10	28

=== Men's events ===
Games	Gold	Silver	Bronze
Individual all-around	Alfred Schwarzmann; Germany	Eugen Mack; Switzerland	Konrad Frey; Germany
Team all-around	Germany; Franz Beckert; Konrad Frey; Alfred Schwarzmann; Willi Stadel; Inno Stangl; Walter Steffens; Matthias Volz; Ernst Winter	Switzerland; Walter Bach; Albert Bachmann; Walter Beck; Eugen Mack; Georges Miez; Michael Reusch; Eduard Steinemann; Josef Walter	Finland; Mauri Nyberg-Noroma; Veikko Pakarinen; Aleksanteri Saarvala; Heikki Savolainen; Esa Seeste; Einari Teräsvirta; Eino Tukiainen; Martti Uosikkinen
Floor exercise	Georges Miez; Switzerland	Josef Walter; Switzerland	Konrad Frey; Germany; Eugen Mack; Switzerland
Horizontal bar	Aleksanteri Saarvala; Finland	Konrad Frey; Germany	Alfred Schwarzmann; Germany
Parallel bars	Konrad Frey; Germany	Michael Reusch; Switzerland	Alfred Schwarzmann; Germany
Pommel horse	Konrad Frey; Germany	Eugen Mack; Switzerland	Albert Bachmann; Switzerland
Rings	Alois Hudec; Czechoslovakia	Leon Štukelj; Yugoslavia	Matthias Volz; Germany
Vault	Alfred Schwarzmann; Germany	Eugen Mack; Switzerland	Matthias Volz; Germany

=== Women's events ===
Games	Gold	Silver	Bronze
Team all-around	Germany; Anita Bärwirth; Erna Bürger; Isolde Frölian; Friedl Iby; Trudi Meyer; Paula Pöhlsen; Julie Schmitt; Käthe Sohnemann	Czechoslovakia; Jaroslava Bajerová; Vlasta Děkanová; Božena Dobešová; Vlasta Foltová; Anna Hřebřinová; Matylda Pálfyová; Zdeňka Veřmiřovská; Marie Větrovská	Hungary; Margit Csillik; Margit Kalocsai; Ilona Madary; Gabriella Mészáros; Margit Nagy; Olga Törös; Judit Tóth; Eszter Voit
Individual all-around†	Trudi Meyer; Germany	Erna Bürger; Germany	Käthe Sohnemann; Germany
Vault†	Anita Bärwirth; Germany	Käthe Sohnemann; Germany	Erna Bürger; Germany
Uneven or Parallel Bars†, ††	Trudi Meyer; Germany	Käthe Sohnemann; Germany	Margit Nagy; Hungary
Balance Beam†	Gabriella Mészáros; Hungary	Zdeňka Veřmiřovská; Czechoslovakia	Erna Bürger; Germany; Consetta Caruccio-Lenz; United States

† Within the sport of artistic gymnastics, although men were recognized with individual medals at the time, the women weren’t. The individuals named within individual events are the individuals who garnered a top-three placement in the team competition on the respective apparatus (or all 3 combined, in the case of the all-around) and who would have been awarded a medal with the rules that commenced with the 1952 Helsinki Summer Olympic Games and that would change periodically at future Olympic Games with respect to the debut of: 1) the individual finals competitions at the 1972 Munich Summer Olympics and 2) the New Life rules that made their Olympic debut at the 1992 Barcelona Summer Olympics.

†† At this Olympics, some women competed on the Uneven Bars while some others competed on Parallel Bars.

== Participating nations ==
A total of 175 gymnasts from 16 nations competed at the Berlin Games:

- Austria (8)
- Bulgaria (7)
- Czechoslovakia (16)
- Finland (8)
- France (8)
- Germany (16)
- Great Britain (8)
- Hungary (16)
- Italy (16)
- Japan (8)
- Luxembourg (8)
- Poland (8)
- Romania (8)
- Switzerland (8)
- United States (16)
- Yugoslavia (16)

== Demonstrations ==
In the Official Report of the Games, gymnastics demonstrations from seven countries are listed on the schedule. These countries were Denmark, Norway, Finland, Hungary, Sweden and Germany, as well as China, which performed a wushu (Chinese boxing) demonstration.
