= Gabriella Mészáros =

Hungarian gymnast (1912–1994)

Olympic medal record

Women's gymnastics

Representing Hungary
Bronze medal – third place	1936 Berlin	Team

Mészáros on balance beam at the 1936 Berlin Summer Olympic Games

Gabriella Mészáros (14 December 1912 – 4 April 1994) was a Hungarian gymnast who competed in the 1936 Summer Olympics. Exceptionally good on beam, she was the highest scorer on balance beam on the voluntary exercise on that apparatus as well as having the highest combined (compulsory and voluntary totalled together) score on that apparatus at the 1936 Summer Olympics. Also, at the first-ever World Championships for Women in 1934, she is credited with being the first gymnast ever to execute a split on the balance beam, during which debut, a judge arose from his/her station to observe the new feat.
