= József Sarlós =

Hungarian gymnast

- Born: 8 July 1909 Párkány, Austria-Hungary
- Died: 9 July 1996 (aged 87) Moldava nad Bodvou, Slovakia

Gymnastics career
- Discipline: Men's artistic gymnastics
- Country represented: Hungary
- Club: Testnevelési Főiskola Sport Egylet

József Sarlós (8 July 1909 – 9 July 1996) was a Hungarian gymnast. He competed in eight events at the 1936 Summer Olympics.
