= Judit Tóth =

Hungarian gymnast (1906–1993)

Olympic medal record

Women's gymnastics

Representing Hungary
Bronze medal – third place	1936 Berlin	Team

World Championships
Gold medal – first place	1934 Budapest	Team

Judit Tóth (27 December 1906 – 9 January 1993) was a Hungarian gymnast who competed in the 1928 Summer Olympics and in the 1936 Summer Olympics.

At the first-ever women's competition at a world gymnastics championships, which at the time were a combination of both gymnastics events and athletics events, Tóth was the highest overall scorer in the gymnastics-events-only segment of the competition, ahead of the first-ever and repeat World All-Around Champion Vlasta Děkanová who, due to her combined strengths in both the gymnastics events and athletics events, is recognized as being the general women's champion of those games.
