= Thomas Albert Delegal =

American politician

Member of the Florida House of Representatives from Suwannee County
- In office 1943–1947

Personal details
- Born: November 15, 1913
- Died: July 25, 1997 (aged 83)
- Party: Democratic
- Spouse: Catherine Wolz
- Children: 3
- Education: University of Florida

Thomas Albert Delegal Sr. (November 15, 1913 – July 25, 1997) was an American politician. A member of the Democratic Party, he served in the Florida House of Representatives from 1943 to 1947.

Delegal died on July 25, 1997, at the age of 83.
