= Willie Jones (cricketer) =

Welsh cricketer & rugby union footballer

Personal information
- Full name: William Edward Jones
- Born: 31 October 1916; Carmarthen, Wales
- Died: 25 July 1996 (aged 79); Gloucester, England
- Batting: Left-handed
- Bowling: Slow left-arm orthodox

Domestic team information
- Years: Team
- 1937–1958: Glamorgan

Career statistics
Competition	First-class
Matches	343
Runs scored	13,536
Batting average	27.12
100s/50s	11/78
Top score	212 not out
Balls bowled	11,750
Wickets	192
Bowling average	30.11
5 wickets in innings	3
10 wickets in match	0
Best bowling	5/50
Catches/stumpings	119/0
- Source: Cricket Archive, 20 June 2014

William Edward Jones (31 October 1916 – 25 July 1996) was a Welsh cricketer active from 1937 to 1958 who played for Glamorgan.

He appeared in 345 first-class matches as a left-handed batsman who bowled slow left-arm orthodox spin. He scored 13,536 runs with eleven centuries and took 192 wickets with a best performance of five for 50.

His highest score was 212 not out against Essex in 1948, when he put on 313 for the third wicket with Emrys Davies in three and a quarter hours. 1948 was his most successful season: he hit his only other double-century, 207 against Kent in 245 minutes, and scored 1656 runs in all matches at an average of 40.39, and took 47 wickets at 25.53, to help Glamorgan to their first County Championship.

He also played rugby union as a fly-half, representing Wales in an international match during World War II.

Jones retired from first-class cricket after the 1958 season and became the cricket coach at Dean Close School in Cheltenham.
