= Erna Bürger =

German gymnast (1909–1958)

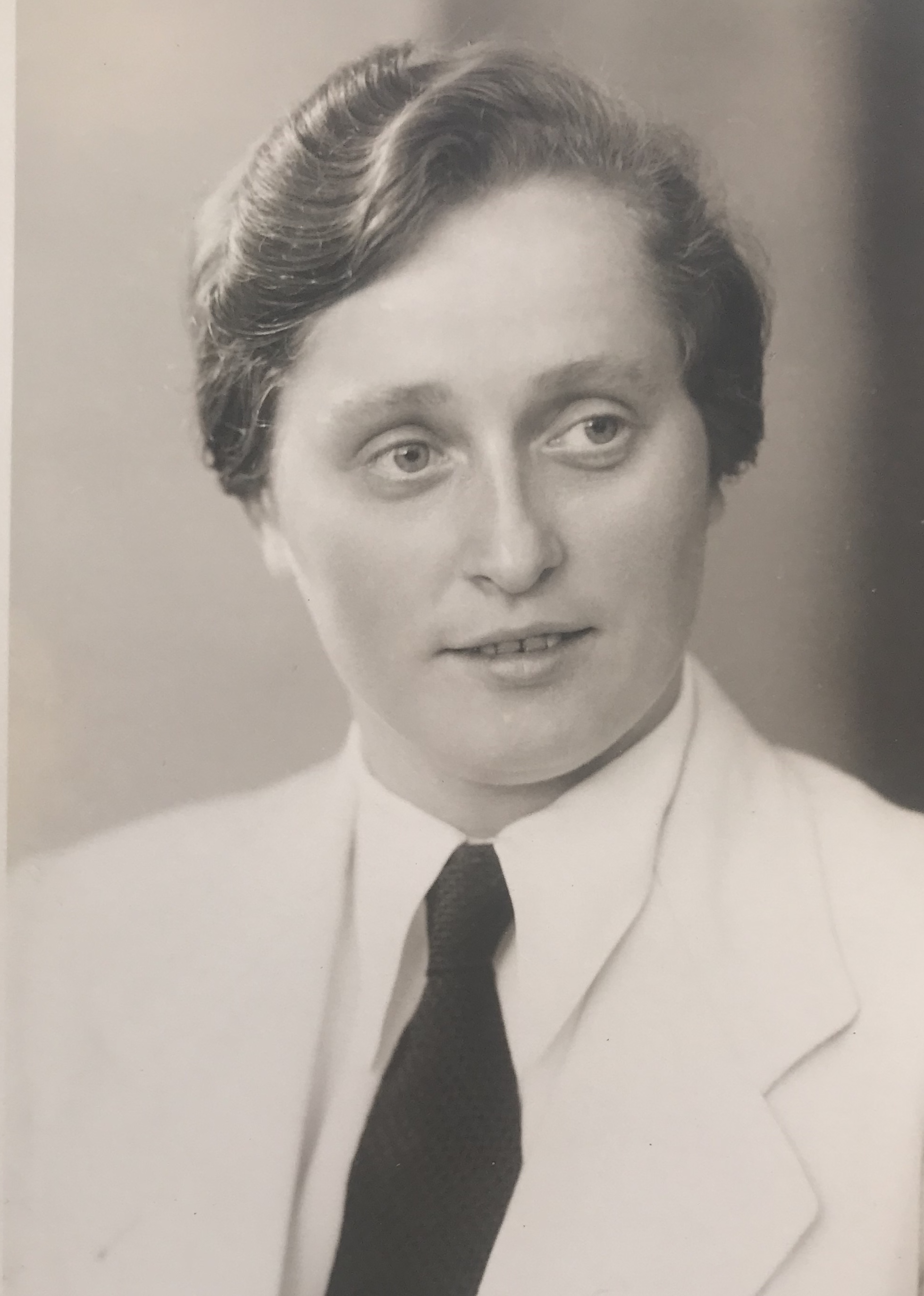
- Erna Bürger at the 1936 Olympics

Personal information
- Born: 26 July 1909 Eberswalde, Brandenburg, German Empire
- Died: 21 June 1958 (aged 48) Düsseldorf, West Germany

Sport
- Sport: Gymnastics
- Club: MTV Eberswalde 1860
Medal record
Women's gymnastics
Representing Germany
Olympic Games
Gold medal – first place	1936 Berlin	Team

Erna Bürger (26 July 1909 – 21 June 1958) was a German gymnast. She competed at the 1936 Summer Olympics and won a team gold medal. She also placed second in the individual event behind teammate Trudi Meyer, but no medals were awarded.
