= Jim Carstairs (Australian footballer) =

Australian rules footballer

Personal information
- Full name: James Carstairs
- Born: 31 August 1929
- Died: 7 July 1996 (aged 66)
- Original team: Essendon Baptist-St Johns
- Height: 187 cm (6 ft 2 in)
- Weight: 87 kg (192 lb)
- Position: Follower

Playing career^{1}
Years	Club	Games (Goals)
1951–57	Essendon	71 (25)
- ^{1} Playing statistics correct to the end of 1957.

Jim Carstairs (31 August 1929 – 7 July 1996) was a former Australian rules footballer who played with Essendon in the Victorian Football League (VFL).
