= Armas Pyy =

Finnish footballer (1913–1996)

Personal information
- Date of birth: 27 May 1913
- Place of birth: Helsinki, Finland
- Date of death: 29 July 1996 (aged 83)
- Place of death: Helsinki, Finland
- Position: Centre-half

Senior career*
Years	Team	Apps	(Gls)
1933-1945	Helsingin Jalkapalloklubi	114	(3)

International career
1937–1943	Finland	14	(0)
- * Club domestic league appearances and goals

Armas Pyy (27 May 1913 – 29 July 1996) was a Finnish footballer. He played in fourteen matches for the Finland national football team from 1937 to 1943. He was also part of Finland's squad for the football tournament at the 1936 Summer Olympics, but he did not play in any matches. He played his whole club career for Helsingin Jalkapalloklubi, where he won Finnish football championship twice.
