= Guyatt Ridge =

Guyatt Ridge (80°38′S 29°27′W) is a ridge southwest of Wedge Ridge in the southern part of the Haskard Highlands, in the Shackleton Range, Antarctica. It was surveyed by the Commonwealth Trans-Antarctic Expedition, 1957, photographed from the air by the U.S. Navy, 1967, and further surveyed by the British Antarctic Survey (BAS), 1968–71. It was named by the UK Antarctic Place-Names Committee after Malcolm J. Guyatt, a BAS general assistant at Halley Station, 1969–71, who worked in the Shackleton Range, 1969–70.
