= Gordon Hurst (cricketer) =

English cricketer (1920–1996)

Personal information
- Full name: Gordon Thomas Hurst
- Born: 28 August 1920; Kenley, Surrey, England
- Died: 6 July 1996 (aged 75); Carshalton, Surrey, England
- Batting: Right-handed
- Bowling: Right-arm off break

Domestic team information
- Years: Team
- 1947–1949: Sussex

Career statistics
| Competition | First-class |
|---|---|
| Matches | 9 |
| Runs scored | 27 |
| Batting average | 3.00 |
| 100s/50s | –/– |
| Top score | 9 |
| Balls bowled | 1,642 |
| Wickets | 28 |
| Bowling average | 27.14 |
| 5 wickets in innings | 2 |
| 10 wickets in match | – |
| Best bowling | 6/80 |
| Catches/stumpings | –/– |
- Source: Cricinfo, 21 June 2012

Gordon Thomas Hurst (26 August 1920 – 6 July 1996) was an English cricketer. Hurst was a right-handed batsman who bowled right-arm off break. He was born at Kenley, Surrey.

Hurst made his first-class debut for Sussex against Cambridge University at Fenner's in 1947. He made eight further first-class appearances for the county, the last of which came against Gloucestershire in the 1949 County Championship. Hurst's role within the Sussex team was a bowler, with him 28 wickets in his nine first-class matches, at an average of 27.14, with best figures of 6/80. He took two five wicket hauls, with his best figures coming against Warwickshire in 1947. With the bat, he scored 27 runs at a batting average of 3.00, with a high score of 9. A shoulder injury limited his appearances while at Sussex.

He died at Carshalton, Surrey, on 6 July 1996.
