= Eugen Mack =

Swiss gymnast

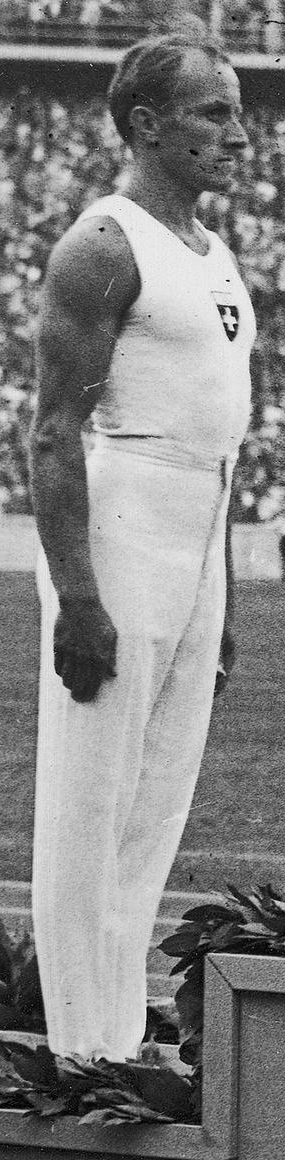

Personal information
- Born: 21 September 1907
- Died: 29 October 1978 (aged 71)

Gymnastics career
- Discipline: Men's artistic gymnastics
- Country represented: Switzerland
Medal record
Olympic Games
Gold medal – first place	1928 Amsterdam	Long Horse Vault
Gold medal – first place	1928 Amsterdam	Team Combined Exercises
Silver medal – second place	1936 Berlin	All-around
Silver medal – second place	1936 Berlin	Long Horse Vault
Silver medal – second place	1936 Berlin	Pommeled Horse
Silver medal – second place	1936 Berlin	Team Combined Exercises
Bronze medal – third place	1928 Amsterdam	Horizontal Bars
Bronze medal – third place	1936 Berlin	Floor Exercises
World Championships
Gold medal – first place	1934 Budapest	Team
Gold medal – first place	1934 Budapest	All-Around
Gold medal – first place	1934 Budapest	Pommel Horse
Gold medal – first place	1934 Budapest	Vault
Gold medal – first place	1934 Budapest	Parallel Bars
Silver medal – second place	1934 Budapest	Floor Exercise
Silver medal – second place	1934 Budapest	Rings
Gold medal – first place	1938 Prague	Vault
Silver medal – second place	1938 Prague	Team
Bronze medal – third place	1938 Prague	All-Around
Bronze medal – third place	1938 Prague	Floor Exercise

Eugen Mack (21 September 1907 – 29 October 1978) was a Swiss gymnast and Olympic Champion. He competed at the 1928 and 1936 Summer Olympics, winning a total of two Olympic gold medals, four silver medals and two bronze medals.

Although Eugen Mack never won the Olympic All-Around Gold, he did become World All-Around Champion, and with 15 individual medals at the World Championships and Olympics, more than any other gymnast - male or female - in the pre-WWII era and pre-1952 era, he is arguably the most decorated gymnast during this era.
