= William Randall Slaughter =

American politician

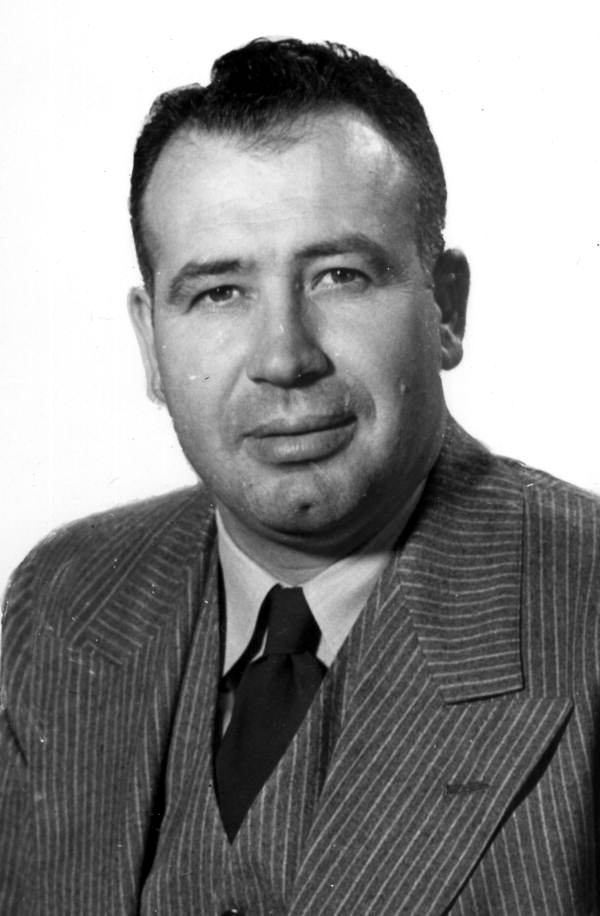
- Slaughter in 1949

Member of the Florida House of Representatives from Suwannee County
- In office 1949

Personal details
- Born: December 28, 1914 Newberry, Florida, U.S.
- Died: March 19, 1978 (aged 63)
- Party: Democratic

William Randall Slaughter (December 28, 1914 – March 19, 1978) was an American politician. He served as a Democratic member of the Florida House of Representatives.

== Life and career ==
Slaughter was born in Newberry, Florida.

Slaughter served in the Florida House of Representatives in 1949. Slaughter served as the State Attorney for the Third Judicial Circuit of Florida from 1952 to 1974. Upon his retirement in 1974, he and his son, William R. Slaughter II founded the law firm of Slaughter and Slaughter in Live Oak, Florida.

Slaughter died on March 19, 1978, at the age of 63.
