= Arthur Luke =

Australian rules footballer (1923–1996)

Personal information
- Full name: Arthur James Luke
- Born: 17 May 1923; Colac, Victoria
- Died: 27 July 1996 (aged 73)
- Original team: Sea Scouts
- Height: 168 cm (5 ft 6 in)
- Weight: 67 kg (148 lb)

Playing career^{1}
Years	Club	Games (Goals)
1948	Geelong	1 (0)
- ^{1} Playing statistics correct to the end of 1948.

Arthur James Luke (17 May 1923 – 27 July 1996) was an Australian rules footballer who played for the Geelong Football Club in the Victorian Football League (VFL).
