= Margit Kalocsai =

Hungarian gymnast (1909–1993)

- Born: 27 December 1909
- Died: 23 November 1993 (aged 83)

Gymnastics career
- Discipline: Women's artistic gymnastics
- Country represented: Hungary
Medal record
Representing Hungary
Olympic Games
| Bronze medal – third place | 1936 Berlin | Team |
World Championships
| Silver medal – second place | 1934 Budapest | All-around |

Margit Kalocsai (27 December 1909 – 23 November 1993) was a Hungarian gymnast who competed in the 1936 Summer Olympics.

At the first-ever World Championships for women, she was the 2nd-place finisher, which stands in extreme contrast to her 41st-place individual result at the 1936 Berlin Summer Olympics where her marks in both the compulsory and voluntary segments on 2 of the 3 events contested were extremely low (61st place overall on the parallel bars and 33rd place overall on the vaulting horse out of a field of 64 competitors), considering her performance at the preceding 1934 World Championships.

Kalocsai's extreme misfortune at the 1936 Berlin Summer Olympics parallels, with immediately adjacent juxtapositioning, the misfortune of Poland's Janina Skirlińska, who finished just below Kalocsai, in 3rd place, in the individual standings at the 1934 Worlds, and again in 4th place at the 1938 Worlds (which Kalocsai and her Hungarian teammates did not attend), yet just above her at the 1936 Berlin Olympics in 40th place. At those Olympics, incidentally, just like Skirlinska, it was Kalocsai's marks, in both segments of the competition, on both parallel bars and vaulting horse, rather than her relatively good placement on beam (5th for Kalocsai and 15th for Skirlinska), that contributed to her reversal in fortune.
