= Jaroslava Bajerová =

Czech artistic gymnast

- Jaroslava Bajerová, cropped from her team's portrait from the 1934 World Championships

Personal information
- Born: 1 April 1910 Brno, Austria-Hungary
- Died: 23 August 1995 (aged 85)

Gymnastics career
- Discipline: Women's artistic gymnastics
- Country represented: Czechoslovakia
Medal record
Representing Czechoslovakia
Olympic Games
Silver medal – second place	1936 Berlin	Team
World Championships
Gold medal – first place	1934 Budapest	Team

Jaroslava Bajerová (1 April 1910 – 23 August 1995) was a Czech artistic gymnast. She competed in the 1936 Summer Olympics where she won the silver medal as member of the Czechoslovak gymnastics team. She was also a member of the Czechoslovak team that won the gold medal at the 1934 World Championships.
