= Krzysztof Beck =

Polish weightlifter (1930–1996)

Personal information
- Nationality: Polish
- Born: 12 April 1930 Kołomyja, Poland
- Died: 3 July 1996 (aged 66) Bydgoszcz, Poland

Sport
- Sport: Weightlifting
- Weight class: –75 kg
Medal record
Representing Poland
European Championships
Silver medal – second place	1956 Helsinki	–75 kg
Bronze medal – third place	1955 Munich	–75 kg

Krzysztof Beck (12 April 1930 – 3 July 1996) was a Polish weightlifter. He competed at the 1956 Summer Olympics and the 1960 Summer Olympics.
