= Vlasta Foltová =

Personal information
- Born: 14 March 1913 Prague, Bohemia, Austria-Hungary
- Died: 2 May 2001 (aged 88) Prague, Czech Republic
- Height: 164 cm (5 ft 5 in)

Gymnastics career
- Discipline: Women's artistic gymnastics
- Country represented: Czechoslovakia
Medal record
Olympic Games
Silver medal – second place	1936 Berlin	Team
World Championships
Gold medal – first place	1938 Prague	Team
Silver medal – second place	1938 Prague	Uneven Bars
Bronze medal – third place	1938 Prague	Balance Beam

Vlasta Foltová (14 March 1913 – 2 May 2001) was a Czech gymnast who competed for Czechoslovakia in the 1936 Summer Olympics.

In 1936 she won the silver medal as member of the Czechoslovak gymnastics team. She was the last surviving member of the team when she died in 2001.
