= Eino Tukiainen =

Finnish artistic gymnast

- Born: 1 January 1915 Viipuri, Grand Duchy of Finland, Russian Empire
- Died: 2 February 1975 (aged 60) Helsinki, Finland

Gymnastics career
- Discipline: Men's artistic gymnastics
- Country represented: Finland
Medal record
Men's artistic gymnastics
Representing Finland
Olympic Games
Bronze medal – third place	1936 Berlin	Team

Eino Tukiainen (1 January 1915 – 2 February 1975) was a Finnish gymnast who competed in the 1936 Summer Olympics.
