= John Govan (cricketer) =

Australian cricketer

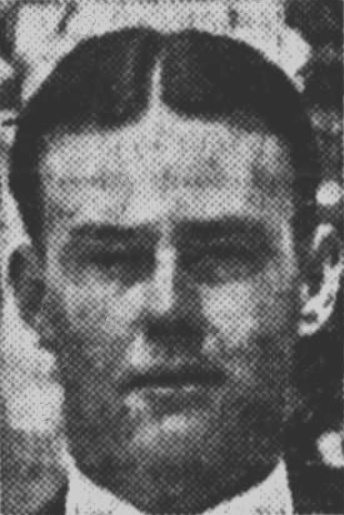

Personal information
- Born: 30 December 1914; Coorparoo, Queensland, Australia
- Died: 20 July 1996 (aged 81); Brisbane, Queensland, Australia
- Source: Cricinfo, 3 October 2020

John Govan (30 December 1914 – 20 July 1996) was an Australian cricketer. He played in seven first-class matches for Queensland between 1932 and 1938.

== See also ==
- List of Queensland first-class cricketers
