= Janina Skirlińska =

Polish gymnast (1907–1993)

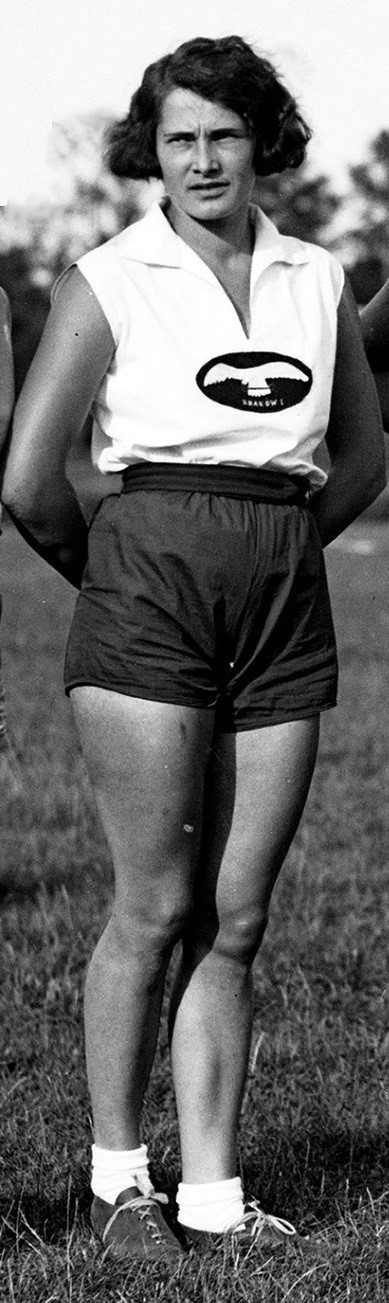
- Skirlińska in 1932 (wording below emblem on uniform shirt reads "Kraków")

Personal information
- Born: 8 March 1907
- Died: 23 April 1993 (aged 86)

Gymnastics career
- Discipline: Women's artistic gymnastics
- Country represented: Poland
Medal record
Representing Poland
World Championships
Bronze medal – third place	1934 Budapest	Team
Bronze medal – third place	1934 Budapest	All-Around
Bronze medal – third place	1938 Prague	Team

Janina Skirlińska (8 March 1907 – 23 April 1993) was a Polish artistic gymnast who competed at the 1936 Summer Olympics. She was a member of the Polish women's team at those Olympics, where they placed 6th in the team competition. Additionally, she was the Bronze All-Around Medalist at the 1934 World Championships (the first-ever edition of those games that included a women's competition), helping her Polish team to the bronze medal at both that World Championships and the next edition of the World Championships in 1938.

== Early life ==
Skirlińska was born on 8 March 1907 in the small village of Żurawiczki, Poland to Władysław and Helena (née Kwaśniewski) Skirliński who have alternatingly been described as belonging to the intelligentsia and landed gentry classes. She graduated from high school in the nearby larger town of Jarosław with a course emphasis on physical education and military training. In her years after high school, she both trained and taught at the Kraków branch of the Polish Sokół movement where she furthered her studies in physical education and military training.

== Competitive career ==
=== Domestic record ===
Skirlińska's earliest competitive sporting endeavors included practicing athletics, shooting, archery, and fencing, but she ended up focusing on gymnastics as her primary sport. Throughout the 1930s, she won the Polish national all-around title 3 times (1935, 1937, 1938), and won 10 apparatus titles at that same level – 2 times on vault (1935, 1936), 4 times on balance beam (1935, 1936, 1937, 1938), 1 time on parallel bars (1938), and 3 times on the free exercises (1935, 1937, 1938).

=== International record ===
Skirlińska's international sporting record extends at least as far back as the 9th Prague Slet in 1932. An event that occurred on the 100th anniversary of the birth of Miroslav Tyrš, held on 12–29 June and 2–6 July, this 1932 Prague Slet was a monumental festival with "180,000 spectators…130,000 gymnasts…[a] parade with 65,000 marchers…[and] advanced gymnastic skills" that registered, over the week-long event, "a million spectators". At this Slet, in addition to there having been an advanced gymnastics competition, which was won by the first-ever World All-Around Champion in artistic gymnastics, Vlasta Děkanová, for whom Skirlińska was a top rival, there was another mixed-athletics event competition, featuring gymnastics events, Athletics events, and other events. In this other series of events, which was contested by a total of 23 athletes from 3 different countries (Czechoslovakia, Poland, and Yugoslavia), behind 1st place Czechoslovak B. Hochmann (who garnered, out of a maximum possible 800 point total, 753 points (or 94.12%)), 2nd place Yugoslavian Milena Sket (who was also a very successful competitor at the 1938 Worlds, having secured 747 points (or 93.37%)), and 3rd place Czechoslovak J. Benešová, who scored 738 points (92.5%), Skirlińska finished in 4th place with 734 points (91.75%).

At the first-ever World Championships for women in 1934, she was the 3rd-place finisher, which stands in extreme contrast to her 40th-place individual result at the 1936 Berlin Summer Olympics where her marks in both the compulsory and voluntary segments on 2 of the 3 events contested were extremely low (48th place overall on the parallel bars and 36th place overall on the vaulting horse out of a field of 64 competitors), considering her performance at the preceding 1934 World Championships. Her results at those Olympics, in addition to standing in extreme contrast to her results at the 1934 World Championships, also stand in extreme contrast to her results at the second-ever World Championships for women in 1938, where, in the all-around individual standings, she was the 4th-place finisher (out of a field of 32 competitors), the highest-finishing non-Czechoslovak female competitor at those championships in Prague, Czechoslovakia.

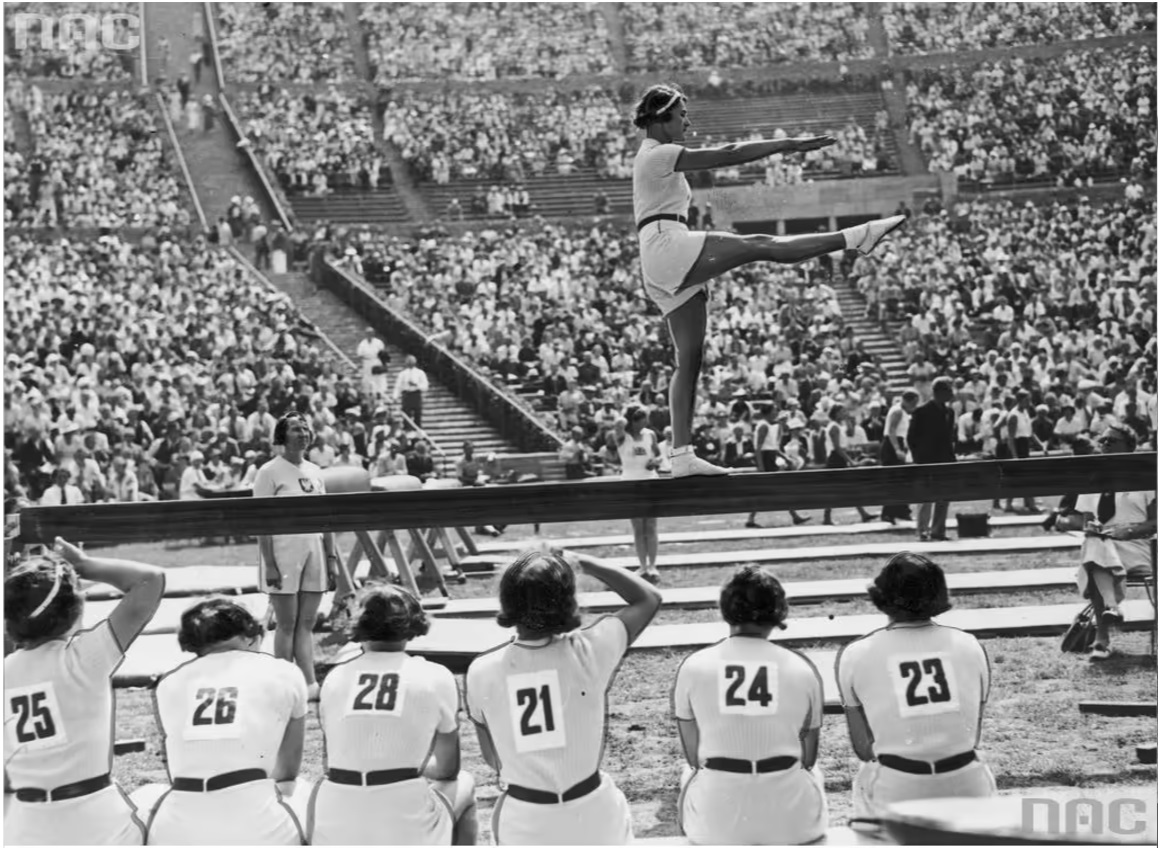
Skirlińska on the Balance Beam at the 1936 Berlin Olympics

Skirlińska's best apparatus was the balance beam where she won more national titles (4) than she did on any other apparatus, tallied the 2nd highest score among the 40 competitors at the 1934 World Championships, placed 15th (as compared to 48th on bars and 36th on vault) at the 1936 Olympics, and came in 4th (among the top 10 all-arounders) at the 1938 World Championships.

== Administrative career and later life ==
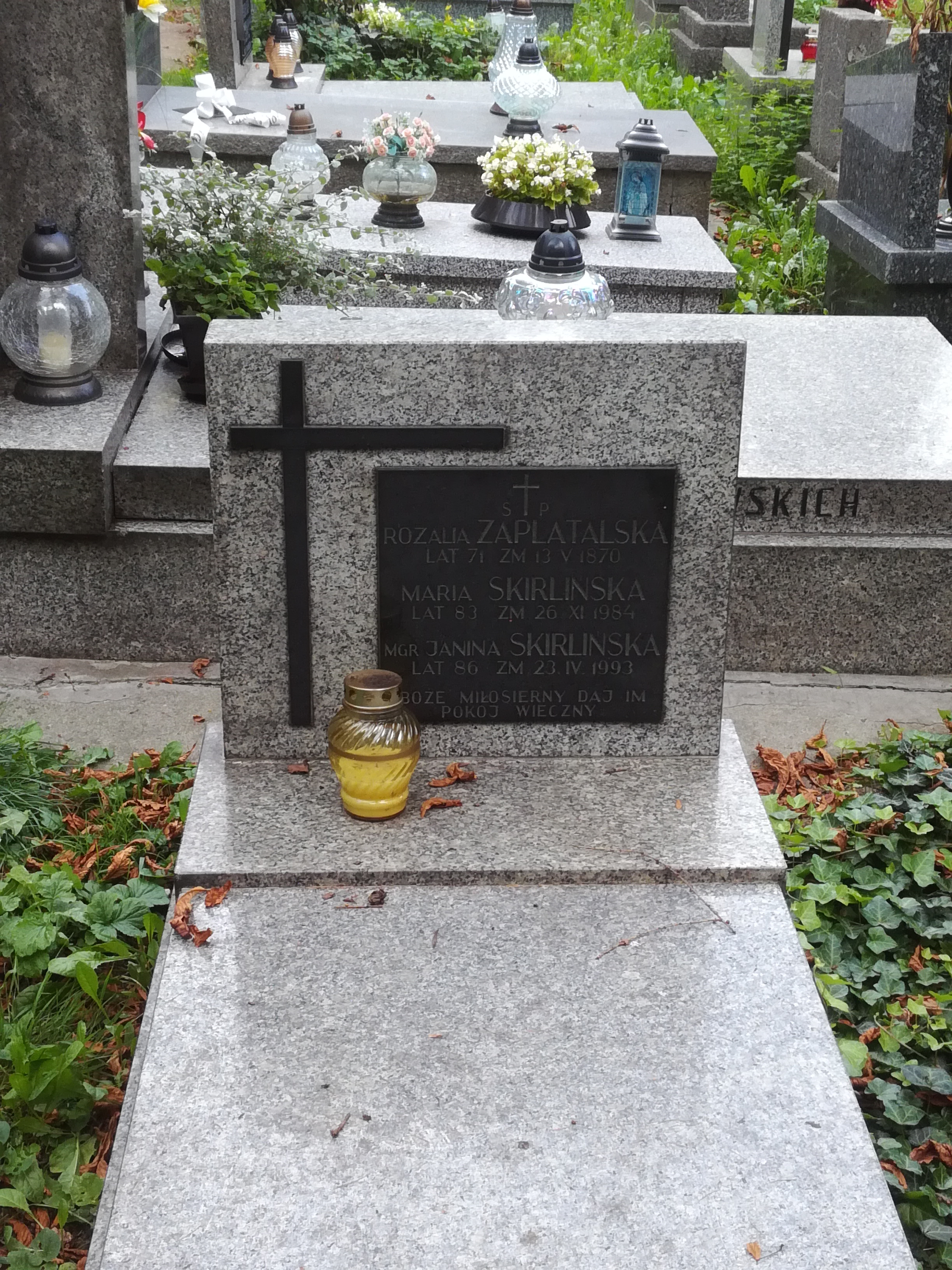
Skirlińska's headstone, at the Rakowicki Cemetery, showing her "Magister" degree distinction

During World War II, Skirlińska worked as a physiotherapist in a neurological and psychiatric clinic. Shortly thereafter, she enrolled in the College of Physical Education in Wrocław, graduating with her Magister (Master's) Degree in 1952, as well as obtaining her “1st class coach” title in 1953. Soon thereafter, she began a long period of employment as a Physical Education teacher at the prestigious Jagiellonian University in Kraków where, from 1957 to 1972, she was a full-time academic at the Department of Theory and Methodology of Gymnastics within the Department of Sports.

Overlapping some of the time that Skirlińska was an academic, she was also the coach of the national gymnastics team from 1949 until about 1960. She also served in administrative capacities within the sport, heading the Women's Committee for the board of the Polish Gymnastics Association. She also served as an international gymnastics judge at five world championships and three Olympics (1952, 1956, and 1968).

After Skirlińska's numerous decades of being a decorated sportsperson at the national and international level, being a wartime therapist, being a long-term academic and high-level sports administrator, and being an international judge at the highest level, she was awarded The Order of Poland's Knight's Cross in 1971, as well as The Odznaka „Zasłużony Działacz Kultury Fizycznej” (Meritorious Activist of Physical Culture).

Skirlińska died on 23 April 1993 and was interred at the Rakowicki Cemetery.
