= Jim Guyatt =

Australian rules footballer (1939–1996)

Personal information
- Full name: Jim Guyatt
- Born: 5 September 1939
- Died: 2 July 1996 (aged 56)
- Original team: Maffra
- Height: 179 cm (5 ft 10 in)
- Weight: 80 kg (176 lb)
- Position: Utility

Playing career^{1}
Years	Club	Games (Goals)
1957–64	St Kilda	114 (22)
- ^{1} Playing statistics correct to the end of 1964.

Jim Guyatt (5 September 1939 – 2 July 1996) was an Australian rules footballer who played with St Kilda in the Victorian Football League (VFL).

== Notes ==
1962 Victorian state team V's South Australia in Adelaide
