= Guy Hénon =

French field hockey player

Guy Albert Marie Hénon (3 February 1912 – 19 July 1996) was a French field hockey player who competed in the 1936 Summer Olympics.

He was a member of the French field hockey team, which finished fourth in the 1936 Olympic tournament. He played two matches as halfback.
