= Petar Džadžić =

Serbian author and critic

Petar Džadžić (Bitola, 18 September 1929 – Belgrade, 31 July 1996) was a Serbian literary critic and corresponding member of Serbian Academy of Sciences and Arts.

Born in Bitola, Džadžić graduated and got his PhD in Philological Faculty of Belgrade University with a subject on Ivo Andrić (on whom he wrote extensively during his career including his influential 1957 book). His first literary criticisms appeared in late 1950s. He favored new, modernist flows in Serbian literature. He was editor in chief of students' magazine Vidici and later on a founder of the highly influential literary magazine Delo. He wrote his criticisms for NIN, Politika and Belgrade state TV (RTB). Džadžić later worked as an editor in Prosveta publishing house. Since 1994 he was a corresponding member of Serbian Academy of Sciences and Arts. He won several prestigious awards including the October Prize (1965).
