= Anna Hřebřinová =

- Hřebřinová at the 1934 World Championships

Personal information
- Born: 11 November 1908 Prague, Bohemia, Austria-Hungary
- Died: 6 December 1993 (aged 85) Prague, Czech Republic

Gymnastics career
- Discipline: Women's artistic gymnastics
- Country represented: Czechoslovakia
Medal record
Olympic Games
Silver medal – second place	1936 Berlin	Team
World Championships
Gold medal – first place	1934 Budapest	Team

Anna Hřebřinová (11 November 1908 – 6 December 1993) was a Czech gymnast who competed for Czechoslovakia in the 1936 Summer Olympics in Berlin, Germany.

In 1936 she won the silver medal as member of the Czechoslovak gymnastics team. Additionally, she was a team-member on the victorious Czechoslovak team at the World Championships in 1934 which was the first-ever World Championships with an official women's competition.
