= List of people from Vancouver, Washington =

The following is a list of notable people who have lived in Vancouver, Washington.

== Notable people ==
- Mary Barnard, poet
- Greg Biffle, NASCAR driver
- Bob Bogle, guitarist and bassist for The Ventures
- Don Bonker, congressman who resided in Vancouver while in office
- Jason V. Brock, filmmaker and writer
- Kirk Brown, businessman
- John Allen Chau, evangelical Christian missionary
- Jordan Chiles, Olympic gymnast
- Alina Cho, journalist
- Westley Allan Dodd, serial killer
- Tina Ellertson, soccer player
- Alan Embree, baseball player
- Brian Eppes, child actor from Barney & the Backyard Gang and Barney & Friends
- Robert Franks, basketball player
- Linda Garcia, environmental activist
- Ulysses S. Grant, 18th president of the United States (stationed at the Columbia Barracks, 1852); born in Point Pleasant, Ohio
- Garrett Grayson, National Football League player
- Tonya Harding, figure skater
- Alex Harris, professional soccer player
- Seth Aaron Henderson, fashion designer
- Ed Herman, mixed martial artist
- Brian Hunter, baseball player
- Eric Izoita, professional soccer player
- Scott Keeney, entrepreneur
- Lars Larson, conservative talk show host
- Ron Larson, author and mathematician
- C.S. Lee, actor
- Maarty Leunen, basketball player
- Hugo McCord, preacher and biblical scholar
- Scott Mosier, film producer
- Randy Myers, baseball player
- Willie Nelson, singer
- William F. Nolan, writer
- Val Ogden, politician
- Chuck Palahniuk, writer
- Greg Peach, Canadian Football League player
- Carol E. Reiley, technology entrepreneur
- Michael Roos, National Football League player
- Dusty Russell, auto daredevil and motorsport promoter
- Isaac Scott, blues guitarist and singer
- Daniel Seavey, singer for Why Don't We
- John Shirley, filmmaker and writer
- Lon Simmons, sportscaster
- Ricky Simon, mixed martial artist
- Tamina Snuka, professional wrestler
- Gerry Staley, baseball player
- Jack L. Tilley, 12th sergeant major of the Army
- Kathi Wilcox, musician
- Taylor Williams, baseball player
- Jeffrey C. Wynn, geophysicist
- Frances Yeend, concert and opera singer

== See also ==
- List of people from Washington (state)
