= List of University of Nevada, Las Vegas, alumni =

This is a list of notable people associated with the University of Nevada, Las Vegas in the United States.

== Academics ==
- Francis J. Beckwith (b. 1960), philosopher and professor at Baylor University
- Theodore Garland Jr. (b. 1956), biologist at University of California, Riverside
- Andrea Hodge, materials scientist at the University of Southern California
- Susan Kunze (b. 1953), teacher and textbook author
- Chip Mosher (1947–2021), newspaper columnist, high school "Educator of Distinction," poet
- James E. Rogers (1938–2014), former interim chancellor of Nevada System of Higher Education
- Elizabeth von Till Warren (1934–2021), historian, preservationist

== Arts and entertainment ==
- Adi Alsaid (b. 1987), writer
- Arianny Celeste (b. 1985), model and UFC ring girl
- Chris Cox, musician
- Gregory Crosby, poet, author, and professor
- Dan "Tito" Davis (b. 1953), author and international fugitive
- Dino (b. 1963), musician and music producer
- Tabitha and Napoleon D'umo, choreographers and creative directors
- Guy Fieri (b. 1968), celebrity chef
- Debra Gauthier, author, former Las Vegas Metropolitan Police Department lieutenant
- Ashlyn Gere, adult film star
- James Gobel, BFA 1996, visual artist, painter
- Michael Godard (b. 1963), artist
- Veronica Hart (b. 1956), adult film star and director
- Lindsay Hartley (b. 1978), actress
- Sophida Kanchanarin (b. 1995), Miss Universe Thailand 2018 and Top 10 finalist at Miss Universe 2018
- Jimmy Kimmel (b. 1967), comedian and talk show host (did not graduate; received honorary degree in 2013)
- Suge Knight (b. 1965), entrepreneur and CEO of Death Row Records, played football at UNLV
- Tomi Lahren (b. 1992), political commentator and television host
- Charlotte Laws (b. 1960), talk show host and author
- Dennis Mackrel (b. 1962), musician
- Kenny Mayne (b. 1959), ESPN personality
- Jade Payton (b. 1992), actress
- Pj Perez (b. 1976), journalist, musician and founding editor of Racket magazine
- Jon Ralston (b. 1959), journalist, political commentator, talk show host
- Dan Reynolds (b. 1987), lead singer of Grammy-winning band Imagine Dragons
- Robert Kevin Rose (b. 1977), former co-host of The Screen Savers and co-founder of Digg
- Ryan Ross (b. 1986), musician, currently with The Young Veins
- Paul Taylor (b. 1960), musician
- Ronnie Vannucci (b. 1976), musician, currently with The Killers
- Daliah Wachs (b.1971), talk show host, media personality, author
- Eric Whitacre (b. 1970), composer of choral and instrumental music
- Kenneth Robert Wilson a.k.a. "Ginger Fish" (b. 1965), member of mainstream band Marilyn Manson
- Bill Zender (b. 1955), author
- Anthony E. Zuiker (b. 1968), creator and executive producer of CSI

== Athletics ==
- Gina Carano (b. 1982), retired mixed martial arts fighter actress, television personality, and fitness model
- Marvin Eastman (b. 1971), football player; professional mixed martial artist
- Andrew Livingston (b. 1978), Olympic swimmer for Puerto Rico
- Mike Mintenko (b. 1975), Olympic swimmer for Canada
- Ryback (b. 1981), born Ryan Reeves, professional wrestler with WWE
- Fred Sowerby (b. 1948), Olympic athlete, holds World Masters Athletics World Record for indoor 400 (1994)

=== Baseball ===
- Bob Ayrault (b. 1966), former baseball pitcher
- Brian Boehringer (b. 1969), former baseball pitcher
- Joe Boever (b. 1960), former baseball pitcher
- Ryan Braun (b. 1980), former baseball pitcher
- Cecil Fielder (b. 1963), former baseball first baseman and designated hitter
- Blake Gailen (b. 1985), American-Israeli baseball outfielder
- Toby Hall (b. 1975), former baseball catcher
- Ken Korach (b. 1952), sports commentator for Oakland Athletics
- Dean Kremer (b. 1996), Israeli-American baseball pitcher for Baltimore Orioles
- Eric Ludwick (b. 1971), former baseball pitcher
- Ryan Ludwick (b. 1978), former baseball right fielder
- David Lundquist (b. 1973), assistant pitching coach of the Philadelphia Phillies
- T.J. Mathews (b. 1970), former baseball pitcher
- Donovan Osborne (b. 1969), former baseball pitcher
- Mel Stottlemyre Jr. (b. 1963), former baseball pitcher
- Todd Stottlemyre (b. 1965), former baseball pitcher
- Matt Williams (b. 1965), former baseball third baseman

=== Basketball ===
- Odis Allison (b. 1949), retired NBA player
- Louis Amundson (b. 1982), basketball player
- Greg Anthony (b. 1967), former basketball player, current college basketball analyst with CBS
- Joel Anthony (b. 1982), basketball player
- Stacey Augmon (b. 1968), former basketball player
- Marcus Banks (b. 1981), basketball player, formerly with Toronto Raptors
- Anthony Bennett (b. 1993), basketball player, formerly with Minnesota Timberwolves
- Ben Carter (b. 1994), American-Israeli basketball player in the Israel Basketball Premier League
- Keon Clark (b. 1975), former basketball player
- Mark Dickel (b. 1976), basketball player
- Armon Gilliam (1964–2011), former basketball player
- Sidney Green (b. 1961), former basketball player
- Larry Johnson (b. 1969), former basketball player
- Derrick Jones Jr. (b. 1997), basketball player, currently plays with the Chicago Bulls
- Kaspars Kambala (b. 1978), current Latvian professional basketball player
- Shawn Marion (b. 1978), former basketball player
- Karam Mashour (b. 1991), Israeli basketball player
- Elijah Mitrou-Long (b. 1996), Canadian-Greek basketball player for Hapoel Holon of the Israeli Basketball Premier League
- J.R. Rider (b. 1971), former basketball player
- René Rougeau (b. 1986), basketball player for Maccabi Haifa of Israeli Basketball Premier League
- Ricky Sobers (b. 1953), former NBA player
- Reggie Theus (b. 1957), former basketball player, former head coach of Cal State Northridge
- H Waldman (b. 1972), American-Israeli basketball player; Israeli Basketball Premier League
- Christian Wood (b. 1995), basketball player, currently plays for the Houston Rockets

=== Football ===
- Beau Bell (b. 1986), football linebacker, formerly with Cleveland Browns
- Glenn Carano (b. 1955), NFL quarterback Dallas Cowboys, USFL quarterback Pittsburgh Maulers, local chef Eldorado Hotel Casino
- Ryan Claridge (b. 1981), former linebacker for New England Patriots
- Hunkie Cooper (b. 1969), former football wide receiver and defensive back
- Ray Crouse, former football running back
- Randall Cunningham (b. 1963), former quarterback for Philadelphia Eagles, Minnesota Vikings
- Joe Hawley (b. 1988), offensive lineman for Atlanta Falcons
- Jeff Horton (b. 1957), current offensive coordinator and running backs coach at San Diego State University
- Keenan McCardell (b. 1970), former football wide receiver
- Jeff McInerney (b. 1960), college football coach, former player
- Aaron Mitchell (b. 1956), former football cornerback and safety
- Wayne Nunnely (1952–2021), former football fullback, former UNLV head coach and NFL assistant coach
- Nick Rolovich (b. 1979), former football quarterback, currently head football coach at University of Hawaii
- Adam Seward (b. 1982), former football linebacker for Jacksonville Jaguars
- Jeff Spek (b. 1960), former NFL and USFL tight end
- Ickey Woods (b. 1966), former football fullback
- Eric Wright (b. 1985), former football cornerback for Cleveland Browns

=== Golf ===
- Chad Campbell (b. 1974), golfer
- Charley Hoffman (b. 1976), golfer
- Skip Kendall (b. 1964), golfer
- Ryan Moore (b. 1982), golfer
- Chris Riley (b. 1973), golfer
- Adam Scott (b. 1980), golfer

=== Soccer ===
- Rod Dyachenko (b. 1983), soccer player, currently with Samut Songkhram F.C.
- Lamar Neagle (b. 1987), soccer player, currently with Seattle Sounders FC
- Jennifer Ruiz (b. 1983), soccer player, formerly with Seattle Reign FC and currently head coach of the UNLV women's soccer team

== Politics ==
- Paul Anderson (b. 1970), Nevada Assembly (R-NV)
- Nelson Araujo (b. 1987), Nevada Assembly
- Derek Armstrong (b. 1980), Nevada Assembly, veteran of US Marine Corps
- Bob Beers (b. 1959), Las Vegas City Council, Nevada Assembly (1998-2004), Nevada Senate (2005-2008)
- Shelley Berkley (b. 1951), congresswoman (D-NV)
- Barbara Buckley (b. 1960), Nevada Assembly (1994-2001)
- George Chanos (b. 1958), former attorney general of Nevada
- Allison Copening (1964–2020), Nevada Senate (2009–2013)
- Olivia Diaz (b. 1978), Nevada Assembly
- Marilyn Dondero Loop (b. 1951), Nevada Assembly (2009–)
- John Ensign (b. 1958), senator (R-NV)
- Aaron Ford (b. 1972), democratic leader of Nevada State Senate (2012–)
- Steve Francis (b. 1954), Nevada Assembly (1983–1985)
- Lloyd D. George (1930–2020), senior judge for U.S. District Court Nevada
- Chris Giunchigliani (b. 1954), Clark County Commissioner (D-NV)
- Carolyn Goodman (b. 1939), current mayor of Las Vegas since 2011
- Scott Hammond (b. 1966), Nevada State Senate
- Dario Herrera (b. 1973), Nevada Assembly (1996), Clark County Commission (1998)
- William Horne (b. 1962), Nevada Assembly (2003–2015)
- Steven Horsford (b. 1973), U.S. representative for Nevada's 4th congressional district (2013–2015)
- Mark Hutchison (b. 1963), current lieutenant governor of Nevada (2015–)
- Brent A. Jones (b. 1963), Nevada Assembly (R-NV)
- Joe Lombardo (b. 1962), incumbent governor of Nevada, 15th sheriff of Clark County
- Sue Lowden (b. 1952), former chairwoman of Nevada Republican Party, former Nevada state senator
- Mike O'Callaghan (1929–2004), 23rd governor of Nevada
- Rory Reid (b. 1963), chairman of Clark Country Commission
- David Roger (b. 1961), former Clark County district attorney
- Jacky Rosen (b. 1957), U.S. representative for Nevada's 3rd congressional district
- Grant Sawyer (1918–1996), 21st governor of Nevada
- Dan Schwartz (b. 1950), current Nevada state treasurer (2015-)
- Tick Segerblom (b. 1948), Nevada Assembly, Nevada State Senate
- Miriam Shearing (b. 1935), former judge
- Shelly M. Shelton, Nevada Assembly (R-NV)
- Scott Sibley (b. 1973), Nevada Assembly
- Steve Sisolak (b. 1953), current governor of Nevada
- Pat Spearman (b. 1955), Nevada Senate
- Danny Tarkanian (b. 1961), Republican politician
- Tyrone Thompson (1967–2019), Nevada Assembly (D-NV)
- Glenn E. Trowbridge (b. 1943), Nevada Assembly (R-NV)
- Bill Young (b. 1956), former sheriff of Clark County
- Kim Wallin (b. 1956), CPA, CMA, CFM, Nevada State Controller (2006–2014)

== Other ==
- Kirk Brown, businessman
- Carley Garner (b. 1977), commodity market strategist, futures and options broker, author
- Jerome D. Mack (1920–1998), founder of Bank of Las Vegas
- George J. Maloof Jr. (b. 1964), president of Maloof Hotels
- Nigahiga (b. 1990), YouTuber
- Joseph A. Pepe (b. 1942), second bishop of Las Vegas, American prelate of Roman Catholic Church
- William Redd (1911–2003), founder of International Game Technology
- RiceGum (b. 1996), Youtuber
- Jay Sarno (1922–1984), founder of the Caesars Palace and Circus Circus
- Blake L. Sartini (b. 1959), CEO of Golden Entertainment, Inc.
- Miki Sudo (b. 1985), competitive eater
