= Zender =

Zender is a surname. Notable people with the surname include:

- Bill Zender (born 1955), American author, business executive, consultant and speaker
- Carlos Bazán Zender (1937–2019), Peruvian medical doctor and politician
- Gladys Zender (born 1939), Peruvian model and beauty queen
- Hans Zender (1936–2019), German conductor and composer
- Stuart Zender (born 1974), British bassist

== See also ==
- Zender GmbH
- Zenderman
