= Unisender =

Email marketing service

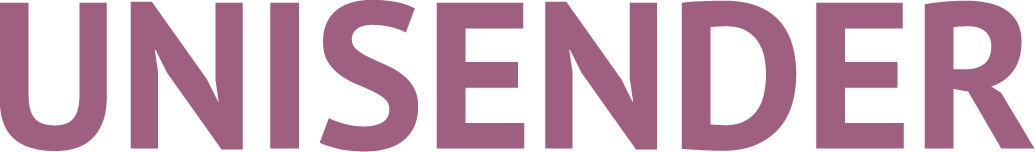
- Company type: Privately held company
- Industry: Electronic mailing list
- Founded: 2008
- Founders: Alexey Kachalov, Konstantin Guschin
- Headquarters: Moscow, Russia
- Area served: Russia, Belarus
- Parent: Unisender Rus, LLC
- Website: unisender.com

Unisender is an email marketing service that was created by Alexey Kachalov and Konstantin Guschin in 2008. They used private expenses of $100,000. In 2014, the business angel investor Evgeniy Medvednikov sold 46,6% of the company to an industry holding with a multiplier of 35X.

In 2012, the company's turnover exceeded $1,000,000. The company's revenue is $23,000,000.

Unisender clients send 460 million emails monthly, and have a delivery rate of 99.4%. The service has 700 thousand clients (as of 2019) which include Rostelecom, Interfax, Black Star, MBM.RU.

In 2015, the service won the AdIndex Awards 2015 in the Direct Marketing. In 2016, the service took the first place in the digital-technologies ranking for online campaigns among email service providers. The service ranks 12th in Email Delivery category, according to Datanyze.

The initial name of the service was MailHelper. It started as a mailing service for founders' projects, however later it became a separate project. In 2009, the service got its current name Unisender and was transformed into a mass email marketing service.

The service allows users to send bulk messages through the Viber messaging app. To do so, they need to register with Unisender, top up their account and create a sender's name.

== Work streams ==
=== B2B ===
In 2016, Unisender took 12th place with a 4.3% share in the Adindex rating of agencies specializing in E-commerce online promotion. The service offers database collection, email marketing setup, DKIM and SPF technical settings and template creation.

=== Education ===
In 2015, Unisender along with plagiarism detection service called ETXT organized the annual conference on content marketing “Russian content marketing immersion”.

In 2017, the company released a set of lessons and materials on email marketing. In December 2018, the course had its 12th flow of students. At the same time, the course “HTML layout and design of letters” was launched. It included 12 online lessons and a final project presentation. Currently there are five courses in the portfolio. From 2017 to 2019, 605 students graduated from the Unisender Email Marketing School.

In 2019, the company released a free email copywriting e-book “Write and Send”.
