= Rebeca Andrade =

Brazilian artistic gymnast (born 1999)

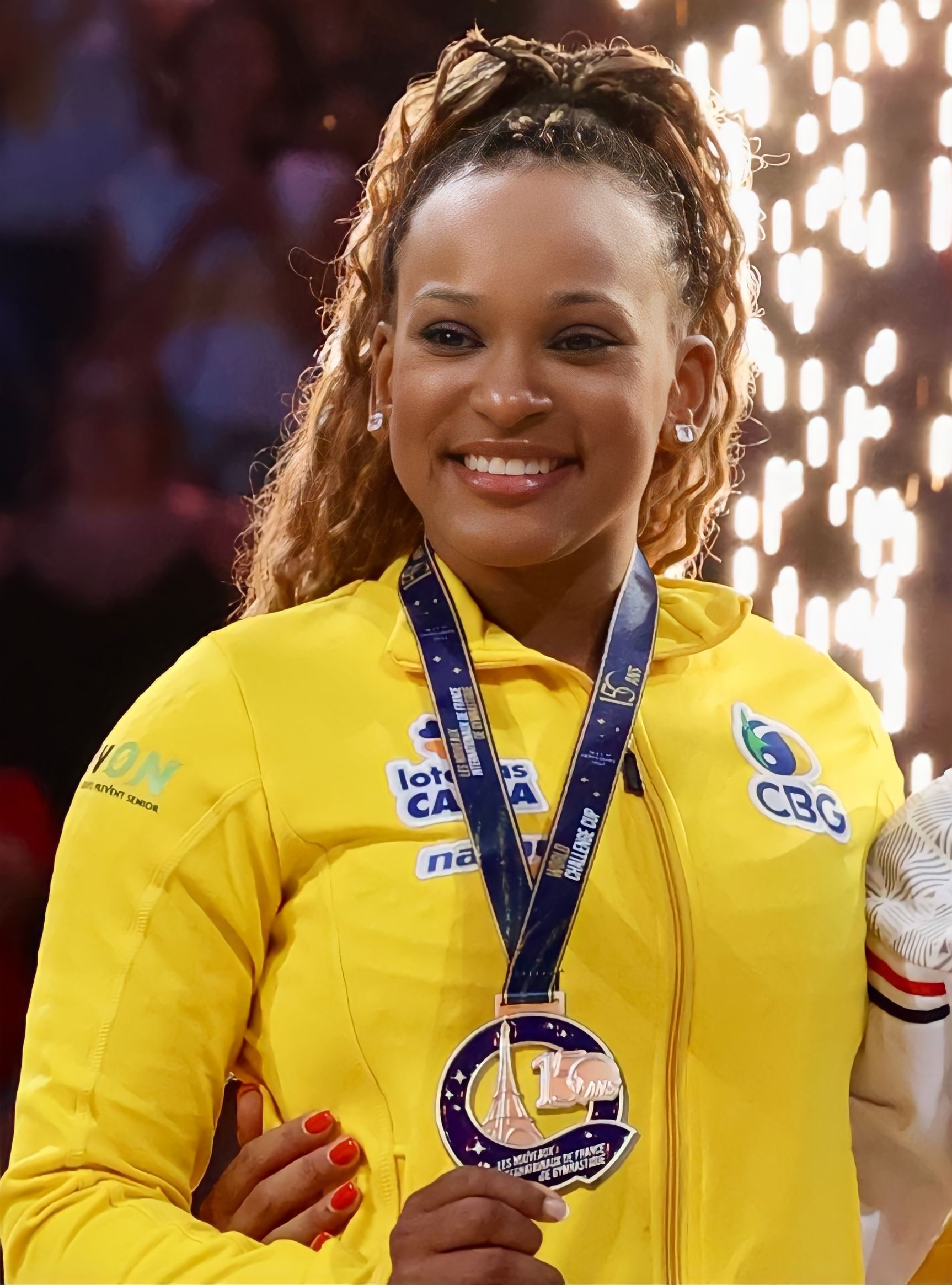
- Andrade at the 2023 Artistic Gymnastics World Cup in Paris

Personal information
- Full name: Rebeca Rodrigues de Andrade
- Nickname: Rebe
- Born: 8 May 1999 (age 27) Guarulhos, São Paulo, Brazil
- Height: 1.52 m (5 ft 0 in)

Gymnastics career
- Discipline: Women's artistic gymnastics
- Country represented: Brazil; (2012–present)
- Club: Clube de Regatas do Flamengo
- Head coach: Francisco Porath
- Former coaches: Keli Tiemi Kitaura; Alexander Alexandrov; Valery Liukin
Medal record
Representing Brazil
Women's artistic gymnastics
Event	1st	2nd	3rd
Olympic Games	2	3	1
World Championships	4	4	2
Pan American Games	2	2	0
Pan American Championships	5	3	0
Total	13	12	3
Olympic Games
Gold medal – first place	2020 Tokyo	Vault
Gold medal – first place	2024 Paris	Floor exercise
Silver medal – second place	2020 Tokyo	All-around
Silver medal – second place	2024 Paris	All-around
Silver medal – second place	2024 Paris	Vault
Bronze medal – third place	2024 Paris	Team
World Championships
Gold medal – first place	2021 Kitakyushu	Vault
Gold medal – first place	2022 Liverpool	All-around
Gold medal – first place	2023 Antwerp	Vault
Gold medal – first place	2026 Rotterdam	Vault
Silver medal – second place	2021 Kitakyushu	Uneven bars
Silver medal – second place	2023 Antwerp	All-around
Silver medal – second place	2023 Antwerp	Floor exercise
Silver medal – second place	2023 Antwerp	Team
Bronze medal – third place	2022 Liverpool	Floor exercise
Bronze medal – third place	2023 Antwerp	Balance beam
Pan American Games
Gold medal – first place	2023 Santiago	Vault
Gold medal – first place	2023 Santiago	Balance beam
Silver medal – second place	2023 Santiago	Team
Silver medal – second place	2023 Santiago	Uneven bars
Pan American Championships
Gold medal – first place	2021 Rio de Janeiro	Team
Gold medal – first place	2021 Rio de Janeiro	All-around
Gold medal – first place	2022 Rio de Janeiro	Team
Gold medal – first place	2022 Rio de Janeiro	Uneven bars
Gold medal – first place	2026 Rio de Janeiro	Vault
Silver medal – second place	2018 Lima	Team
Silver medal – second place	2022 Rio de Janeiro	Balance beam
Silver medal – second place	2026 Rio de Janeiro	Team
FIG World Cup
Event	1st	2nd	3rd
World Cup	3	1	1
World Challenge Cup	3	7	2
Total	6	8	3

Rebeca Rodrigues de Andrade (Brazilian Portuguese pronunciation: [ʁeˈbɛkɐ ʁoˈdɾiɡiz dʒ(i)ɐ̃ˈdɾadʒ(i)]; born 8 May 1999) is a Brazilian artistic gymnast. Having won a total of six Olympic and ten World medals, she is the most decorated Brazilian and Latin American gymnast of all time, as well as the most decorated Brazilian Olympian in any discipline. In the all-around, she is the 2022 World champion, a two-time Olympic silver medalist (2020, 2024), the 2023 World silver medalist, and the 2021 Pan American champion. On vault, she is the 2020 Olympic gold medalist, the 2024 Olympic silver medalist, a three-time World Champion (2021, 2023, 2026), and the 2023 Pan American Games champion. In the floor exercise, she is the 2024 Olympic gold medalist, 2023 World silver medallist, and 2022 World bronze medallist. She led the Brazilian team to its first ever team medals at the 2023 World Championships (silver) and the 2024 Olympics (bronze), as well as the gold medal at the 2021 Pan American Championships.

Andrade is the first Brazilian female gymnast to medal at an Olympic Games and only the second Brazilian woman to win a gold medal at the World Artistic Gymnastics Championships. Andrade is one of only 11 female gymnasts to have medalled on every event in the history of World Championships, and one of only three gymnasts to have done so in the 21st century, alongside Simone Biles and Aliya Mustafina.

At the junior level, she is the 2012 Junior Pan American champion in the all-around and on vault and floor exercise, and the 2014 Junior Pan American champion on the vault, uneven bars, and balance beam. After a successful junior career, Andrade's senior debut in 2015 was cut short by the first of three ACL tears. She returned to competition and represented Brazil at the 2016 Summer Olympics, where she placed eleventh in the all-around final. She tore her ACL for the second time in 2017, but made her World Championships debut in 2018. After her third ACL tear in 2019, Andrade represented Brazil at the 2020 Summer Olympics and at the 2021 World Championships, where she won the vault gold medal at both events.

== Early life ==
Andrade was born on 8 May 1999 in Guarulhos. She is one of eight children of a single mother, Rosa. Her mother cleaned houses and walked to work in order to pay for her gymnastics training. She began gymnastics when she was four years old after her aunt took her to the gym where she worked. When she was nine years old, she moved to train in Curitiba, and a year later she moved to Rio de Janeiro to train at Flamengo. She speaks both Portuguese and English, and she is Afro-Brazilian.

== Gymnastics career ==
=== 2012 ===
Andrade made her international debut when she was thirteen years old at the Junior Pan American Championships. She helped Brazil win the team silver medal behind Canada and ahead of Mexico. Individually, she won the gold medal in the all-around, on vault, and the floor exercise, and she won the bronze medal on the balance beam. Then at the Junior South American Championships in Cochabamba, she placed first with the Brazilian team as well as in the individual all-around. She also competed at the Brazil Trophy, a domestic competition for both juniors and seniors, where she edged out Olympians including Jade Barbosa and Daniele Hypólito to claim the all-around title.

=== 2013 ===
Andrade continued her success at the junior level in 2013. She began her 2013 season at the Nadia Comăneci Invitational in Oklahoma City, and she won the gold medal in the junior all-around. In August, she competed at her second Junior South American Championships, and the Brazilian team won the gold medal. Individually, Andrade won the bronze medal in the all-around behind teammates Lorrane Oliveira and Flávia Saraiva. She also won the gold medal on vault and uneven bars and the silver medal on the balance beam behind Saraiva. In November, she competed at the Gymnasiade, which were held in Brasília. The Brazilian team won the silver medal behind Russia, and Andrade won the bronze medal in the all-around behind Alla Sosnitskaya and Flávia Saraiva. In the event finals, she won the gold medal on vault and placed sixth on the floor exercise.

=== 2014 ===
In February, Andrade began the season by competing at the WOGA Classic in Plano, Texas. She won the gold in the all-around, on vault, and on uneven bars, and she won the silver with the team, on balance beam, and on floor exercise. She later competed at the Junior Pan American Championships in Aracaju where she helped team Brazil win the silver medal behind Canada. Individually, she won the silver in the all-around and on floor exercise both behind Flávia Saraiva and the gold on vault, uneven bars, and balance beam. She was initially scheduled to represent Brazil at the 2014 Summer Youth Olympics in Nanjing, China. However, she withdrew due to a broken toe and was replaced by teammate Flávia Saraiva. Andrade did not compete for the rest of the 2014 season.

=== 2015 ===
Andrade became age-eligible for senior international competitions in 2015. She recovered from her toe injury and made her senior international debut at the Ljubljana World Cup, where she won the bronze medal on the uneven bars behind Isabela Onyshko and Jonna Adlerteg. She then went to the São Paulo World Cup and won the silver medal on vault behind Deng Yalan; she placed seventh on the uneven bars. She then went to the Flanders International Team Challenge in Ghent where a mixed team of Brazilian and Italian gymnasts won the bronze medal. In the all-around, she won the silver medal behind Flavia Saraiva. In June, Andrade tore her ACL which caused her to miss her most important competitions of the season – the Pan American Games and the World Championships.

=== 2016 ===
In 2016 Andrade returned to competition after her ACL injury. She returned at the City of Jesolo Trophy. She only competed on the vault, uneven bars, and balance beam. She helped the Brazilian team win the silver medal behind the United States. She qualified for the uneven bars event final where she finished eighth. She then competed at the Doha World Cup and won the silver medal on the uneven bars behind Jonna Adlerteg.

She was selected to compete at the Olympic Test Event alongside Jade Barbosa, Daniele Hypólito, Lorrane Oliveira, Carolyne Pedro, and Flávia Saraiva in order to attempt to qualify Brazil a team quota for the Olympic Games. Andrade competed on vault and uneven bars only, and she performed a double-twisting Yurchenko vault and a clean uneven bars routine. The Brazilian team won the gold medal in the team event and qualified a full team to the 2016 Summer Olympics. Individually, she qualified for the uneven bars final, where she won the bronze medal behind Germans Elisabeth Seitz and Sophie Scheder.

She then competed at the São Paulo World Cup, where she qualified for the uneven bars and balance beam finals. In the uneven bars final, she tied with German Kim Bui for the silver medal. The next day on the balance beam, she won the bronze medal behind teammate Daniele Hypólito and Simona Castro. She then went to the Anadia World Cup where she won two silver medals on balance beam and floor exercise, both behind teammate Saraiva. In late June, Andrade was officially named to the Brazilian Olympic team alongside Barbosa, Hypólito, Oliveira, and Saraiva.

After the Anadia World Cup, Andrade was named to represent Brazil at the 2016 Summer Olympics alongside Jade Barbosa, Daniele Hypólito, Lorrane Oliveira, and Flavia Saraiva. Her final competition in preparation for the Olympics was a friendly meet in the Netherlands on 10 July where she tied with Dutch gymnast Eythora Thorsdottir for the gold medal in the all-around.

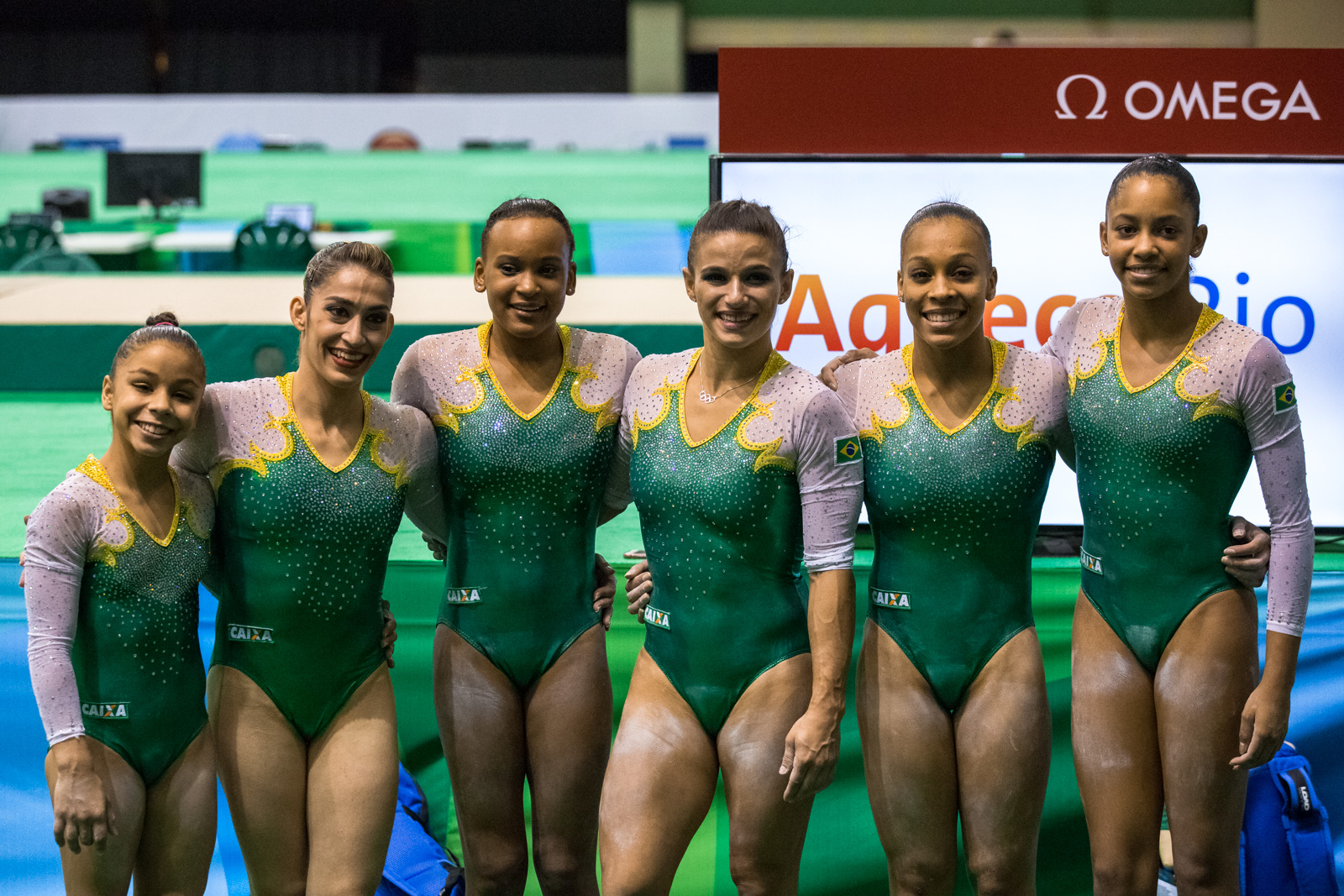
Team Brazil at the Olympic Test Event

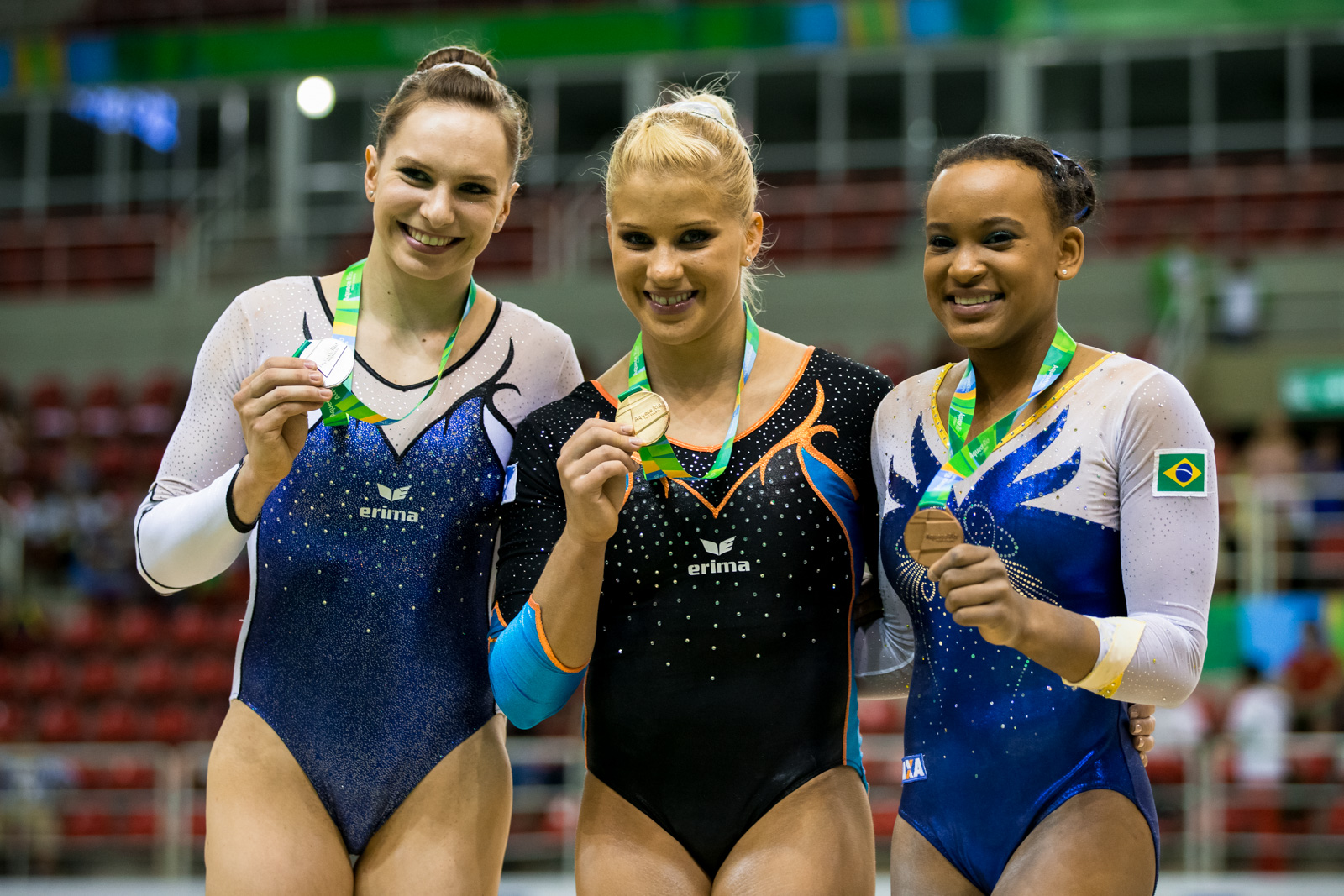
Uneven bars podium at the Olympic Test Event

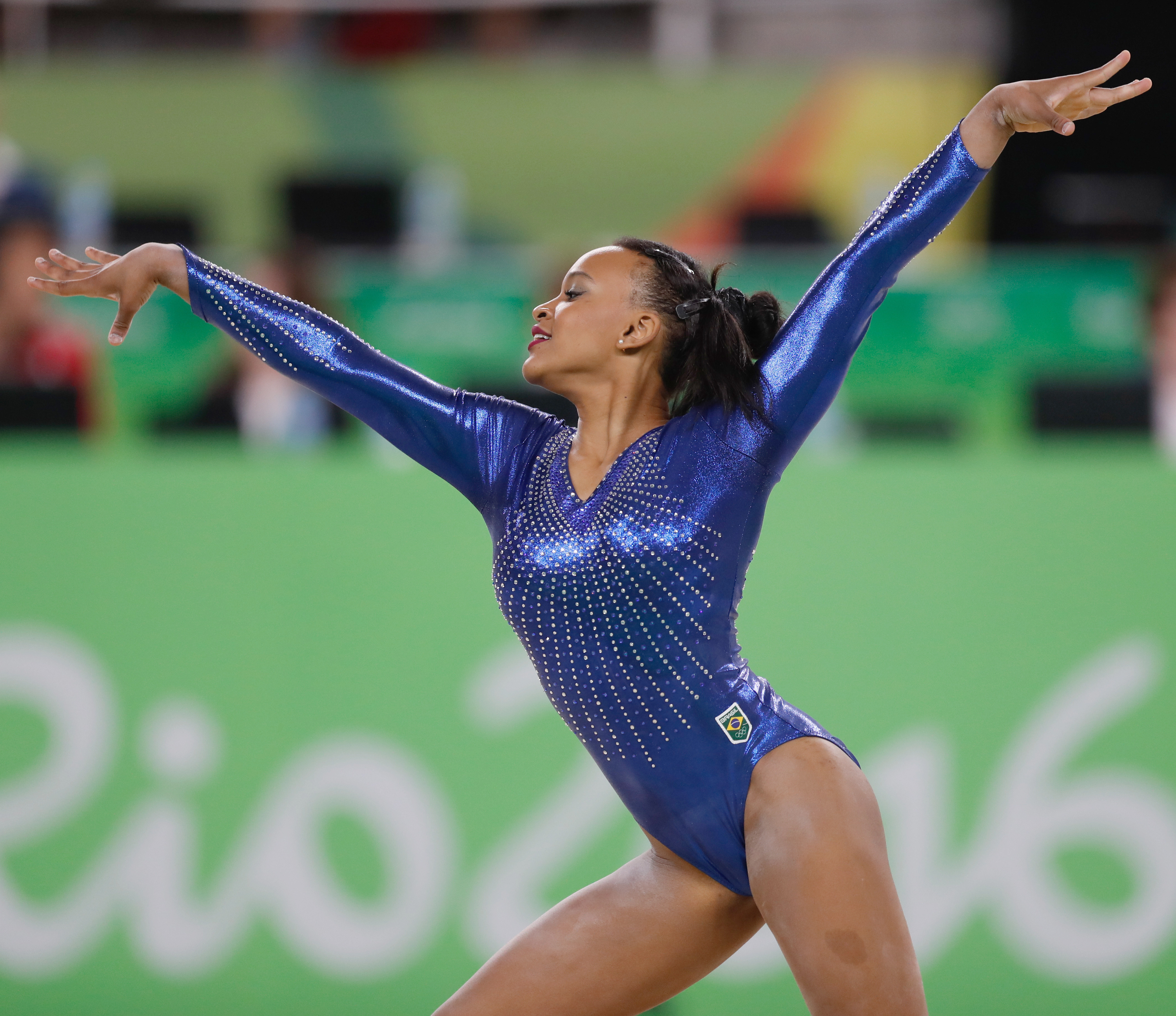
Andrade in 2016 at the Olympic Games

At the 2016 Olympics, Andrade performed well in the qualification round and helped Brazil qualify for the team finals in fifth place. She qualified individually to the all-around final in third place with a total score of 58.732 behind American gymnasts Simone Biles and Aly Raisman. During the team finals, Andrade fell on the floor exercise, and the Brazilian team finished eighth. In the individual all-around, she finished eleventh with a total score of 56.965.

After the Olympic Games, Andrade competed at the Brazilian Championships in November. She won the gold medal with the Flamengo club team in the all-around, uneven bars, and balance beam. She won the silver medal on floor exercise behind Thais Fidelis.

=== 2017 ===
Andrade won three World Cup medals in 2017 but also endured two different injuries. She began her season at the City of Jesolo Trophy, where the Brazilian team won the silver medal behind the United States. Andrade won the silver medal in the all-around behind American gymnast Riley McCusker. In the event finals, she finished fifth on the uneven bars, sixth on the balance beam, and fourth on the floor exercise. She then competed at the Koper Challenge Cup and won the gold medal on vault. Then at the Osijek Challenge Cup, she only competed on the uneven bars but did not qualify for the event final.

In May, Andrade injured her ankle during training and had to wear a protective boot for two months. She returned to competition in August at the Brazilian Championships, where she only competed on the uneven bars and won the gold medal. She then competed at the Varna Challenge Cup and won the gold medal on both the vault and the uneven bars.

Andrade was initially named to the World Championships team along with first-year senior Thais Fidelis; however, she tore her ACL for a second time during the warm-ups for podium training and withdrew.

=== 2018–2019 ===
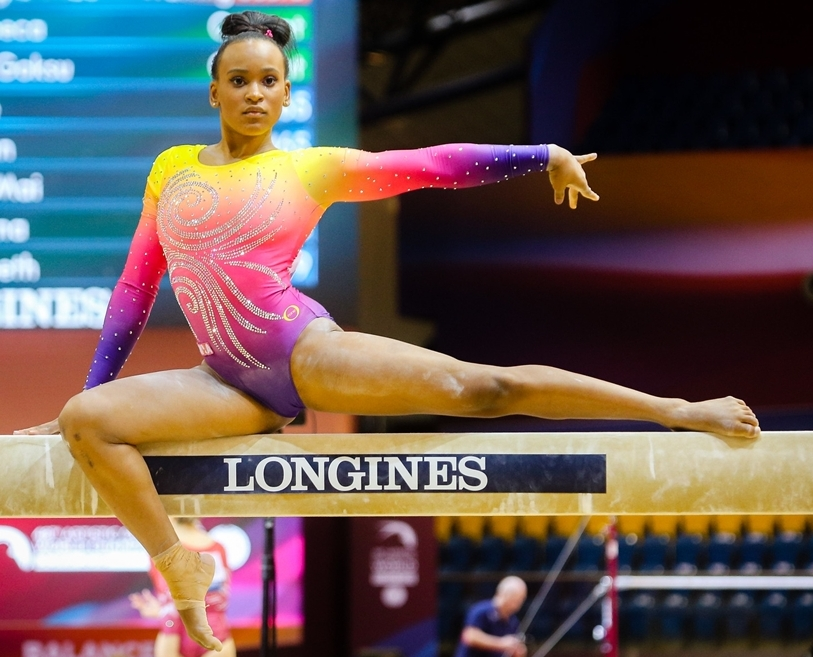
Andrade on the balance beam at the 2018 World Championships.

Andrade competed at her first World Championships in 2018 after returning from her second ACL tear but was only able to compete for a little less than a year before tearing her ACL for the third time. She returned to competition in September 2018 at the Pan American Championships. She only competed on two events, the vault and uneven bars. She helped the Brazilian team win the silver medal behind the United States. She was then named to the Brazilian team for the 2018 World Championships alongside Jade Barbosa, Thais Fidelis, Lorrane Oliveira, and Flavia Saraiva. Andrade made her World Championships debut and competed on the vault, uneven bars, and balance beam, and Brazil qualified for the team final in fifth place. In the team final, the Brazilian team finished seventh after Andrade, Barbosa, and Saraiva all fell on the uneven bars. After the World Championships, Andrade competed at the 2018 Cottbus World Cup where she won the gold medal on vault and balance beam and the silver medal on uneven bars behind Nina Derwael.

Andrade only competed once in 2019; at the DTB Team Challenge in Stuttgart, she helped the Brazilian team win team gold, and she won the all-around gold medal. At the Brazilian Championships, Andrade tore her ACL for the third time in her career. This ended her 2019 season and caused her to miss the 2019 World Championships. At the World Championships, the Brazilian team without Andrade finished fourteenth and did not qualify a team for the 2020 Olympic Games.

=== 2020 ===
Andrade's comeback was cut short by the COVID-19 pandemic. She returned to competition at the Baku World Cup, where she finished third on uneven bars behind Fan Yilin and Anastasia Ilyankova and second on balance beam behind Urara Ashikawa during qualifications and therefore qualified to the event finals. However, the event finals were canceled due to the pandemic in Azerbaijan. In July, Andrade and numerous other Brazilian Olympic hopefuls traveled to Portugal as they were unable to resume training due to the pandemic in Brazil remaining unstable and gyms remaining closed. In December 2020, she tested positive for COVID-19 but was asymptomatic.

=== 2021 ===
Andrade had a breakthrough year in 2021 and won her first Olympic and World medals. She returned to competition at the Pan American Championships which offered her a chance to qualify for the Olympic Games as an individual. The Brazilian team of Andrade, Christal Bezerra, Ana Luiza Lima, Lorrane Oliveira, and Júlia Soares won the gold medal. Individually, Andrade won the gold medal in the all-around with a total score of 56.700. This result earned her and Luciana Alvarado the continental quota spots for the 2020 Olympic Games.

In the qualification round, Andrade qualified in third place to the vault final, fourth to the floor exercise final, and second to the all-around final. Following Simone Biles’ withdrawal, Andrade entered the all-around final as the top qualifier. After leading the competition in the first two rotations of the all-around final, Andrade won silver in the all-around after stepping out of bounds on two of her floor exercise tumbling passes. This was the first-ever Olympic medal for a female Brazilian gymnast.

Setting another record for her country, she won the gold medal in the vault final with an average score of 15.083. This made her the first Olympic champion in Brazilian women's artistic gymnastics history.

In the floor final, Andrade placed fifth with a score of 14.033 after stepping out of bounds on two of her tumbling passes. Reflecting on her success at the Games, Andrade told reporters, "[T]his is not only for me but for the whole of Brazil. I want to inspire younger kids with my achievements... It's not just the medals. I made everybody proud of me." She was chosen to be the flag bearer for Brazil at the closing ceremony.

Andrade continued training after the Olympic Games. She helped her club win the team gold medal at the Brazilian Championships. She also won the gold medal in the all-around. At the World Championships in Kitakyushu, she competed on the vault, uneven bars, and balance beam. She chose not to compete on the floor exercise in order to preserve her health. She qualified for all three event finals. She finished first on both the vault with an average score of 14.800 and on the uneven bars with a score of 15.100, and she finished eighth on the balance beam. She became the first Brazilian gymnast to ever qualify for a World uneven bars event final.

In the vault final, she won the gold medal with an average score of 14.966, nearly a full point ahead of silver medalist Asia D'Amato. This was Brazil's second women's gold medal at the World Artistic Gymnastics Championships, the first being Daiane dos Santos's gold medal on the floor exercise in 2003. Then in the uneven bars final, she scored a 14.633 and won the silver medal behind Chinese gymnast Wei Xiaoyuan becoming the first Brazilian gymnast to win a World medal on the uneven bars. On the next day, she finished sixth in the balance beam event final, tying the best-ever finish of a Brazilian woman in this event with Flávia Saraiva in 2019.

=== 2022 ===
Andrade began her 2022 season in May at the Trophy Brazil, where she won the gold medal on the uneven bars and the silver on the balance beam.

In July, Andrade was named to the Brazilian team for the Pan American Championships alongside Flávia Saraiva, Christal Bezerra, Lorrane Oliveira, Carolyne Pedro and Júlia Soares. On the first day of competition, which determined the all-around and apparatus results, Andrade won the gold medal on the uneven bars as well as the silver medal on the balance beam behind Saraiva. Additionally, she helped Brazil qualify to the team final in first place. She opted not to compete on floor exercise. In the team final, Andrade contributed scores on vault, uneven bars, and balance beam towards Brazil's first-place finish ahead of the United States and Canada — their first victory over the United States at the competition since 1997. Andrade stated that "This win is very big for the future of gymnastics [in Brazil], for the girls that are coming up and the ones who came before us."

In August, Andrade competed at the Brazilian Championships, where she won the all-around ahead of Saraiva and Soares and also received the highest scores on vault, uneven bars and balance beam, as well as the second highest on floor exercise, despite performing watered-down routines. In September, Andrade competed at the Paris World Challenge Cup; she only competed on the uneven bars. She won silver behind American Shilese Jones.

In October, Andrade was named to the team to compete at the World Championships in Liverpool alongside Saraiva, Soares, Oliveira, Pedro and Bezerra. In the qualification round, Andrade qualified in first place to the all-around final, second to the floor final, third to the uneven bars final, seventh to the beam final, and helped Brazil qualify to the team final in third place. On vault, she scored 15.066 for her first vault, a Cheng, however, her hands slipped on the table during her second vault attempt, performing just a Yurchenko back tuck instead of her intended double twist. Her second vault scored 11.466, putting her outside the final. In the team final, Brazil finished fourth behind the United States, Great Britain and Canada. In the all-around final, Andrade won the gold medal ahead of Shilese Jones and Jessica Gadirova with a score of 56.899, becoming the first South American gymnast to win a World all-around title. Andrade then won the bronze medal in the floor exercise final alongside Jade Carey, finishing behind Jessica Gadirova and Jordan Chiles, who finished in first and second place respectively.

=== 2023 ===
Andrade competed at the Brazilian national championships in August, but did not compete on floor exercise. She placed first on both uneven bars and balance beam. She next competed at the Paris World Challenge Cup where she placed second on uneven bars behind Mélanie de Jesus dos Santos.

In late September, Andrade competed at the World Championships in Antwerp alongside Flávia Saraiva, Jade Barbosa, Júlia Soares, and Lorrane Oliveira. Together they won a historic silver medal behind the United States, earning Brazil their first team medal at a World Championships. During the all-around final Andrade finished second behind Simone Biles. On the first day of event finals Andrade won gold on vault ahead of Biles after the latter fell on her eponymous skill. On the final day of competition Andrade won bronze on balance beam and silver on floor exercise. In winning a medal on balance beam, Andrade became the eleventh gymnast to win a World Championships medal on every single apparatus.

Andrade ended the year competing at the Pan American Games in Santiago. During qualification (which also served as the team final), she competed on vault, uneven bars, and balance beam towards Brazil's second-place finish. She qualified to all three event finals. During the vault final Andrade won after performing what many described as the "best Cheng in history". During the uneven bars final she won silver behind Zoe Miller and won gold on balance beam ahead of teammate Saraiva.

=== 2024 ===
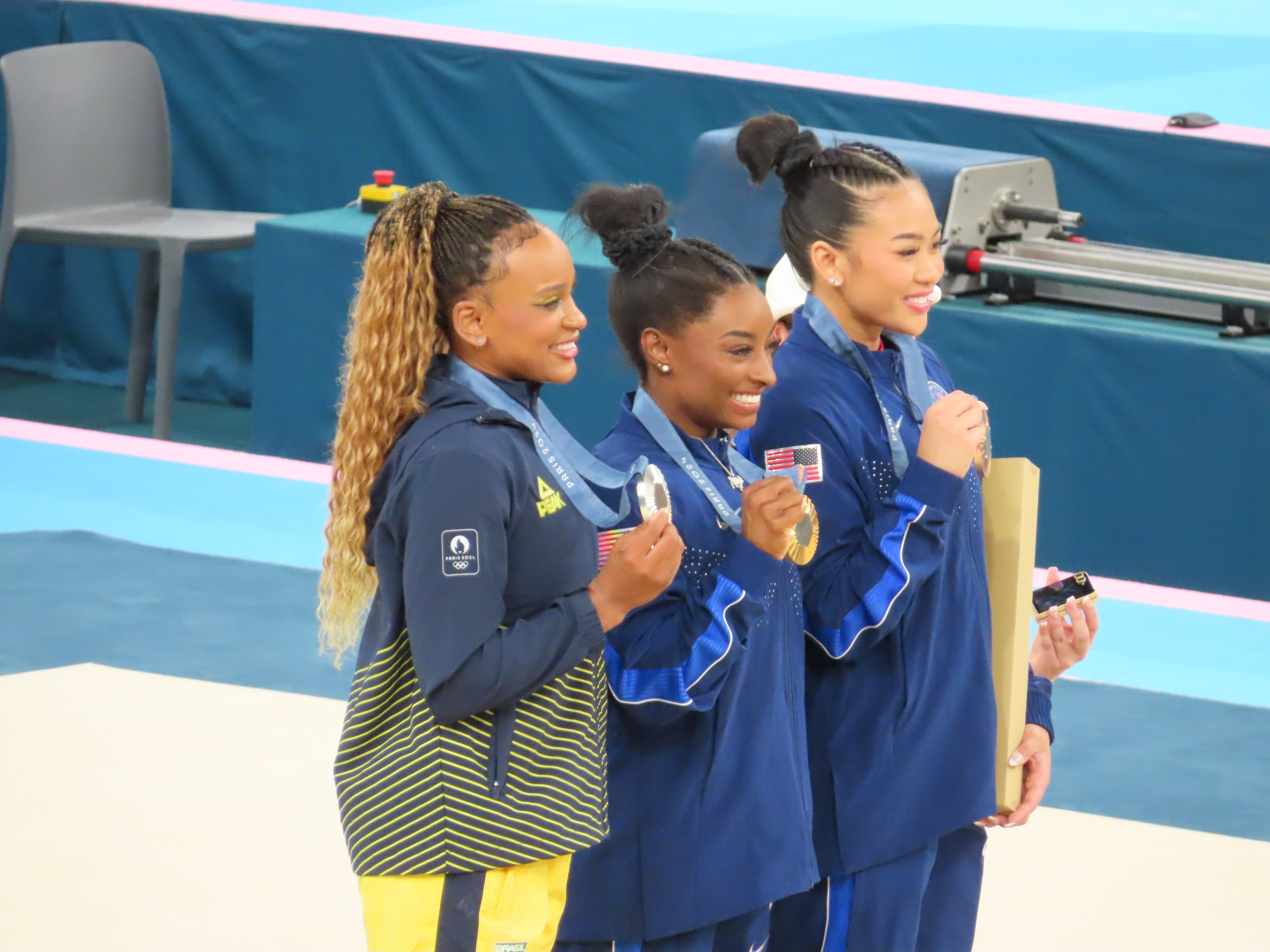
Andrade winning the silver medal in the all-around at the 2024 Olympics

Andrade began her Olympic year in March, competing at the Antalya World Challenge Cup, where she only competed on the uneven bars. She won silver behind Mélanie de Jesus dos Santos.

At the 2024 Paris Olympics, Andrade and the Brazilian team won the bronze medal in the team all-around final, the first ever for the country. She also won the silver medal in the individual all-around final. On the first day of apparatus finals, Andrade won the silver medal on vault. Andrade then competed during the third day of apparatus finals on beam and floor, placing fourth on beam and winning gold on floor. Her performance in the latter final bested Diego Hypólito's second-place finish at the 2016 Olympics to make her the first Brazilian Olympic floor champion of either gender. During the floor final medal ceremony, Simone Biles and Jordan Chiles bowed to Andrade as she walked onto the podium, a gesture that went viral. Andrade's collective six medals from the 2020 and 2024 Olympics make her the most decorated Brazilian Olympian in any discipline, a record previously held by sailors Robert Scheidt and Torben Grael.

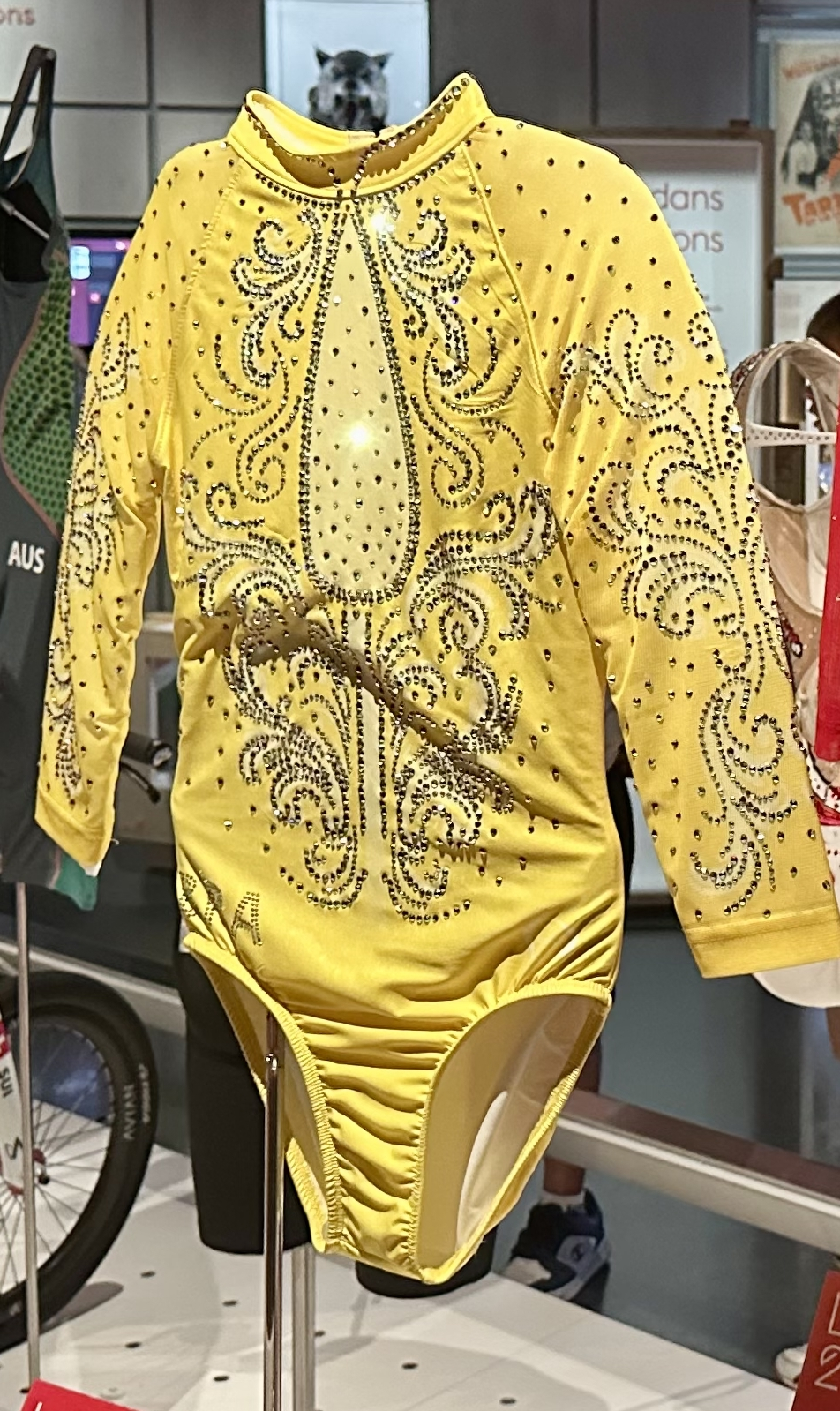
Leotard worn by Andrade at the 2024 Olympic Games on display at the Olympic Museum in Lausanne

Andrade later donated the leotard she wore during her silver medal-winning all-around performance at the 2024 Summer Olympics, which was designed by Olympic teammate Jade Barbosa, to the Olympic Museum.

=== 2025–2026 ===
Andrade did not compete in any competitions throughout 2025 as she decided to rest and take a gap year from gymnastics. On February 6 2026, Andrade participated in the opening of the 2026 Winter Olympics carrying the Olympic flag.

Andrade made her return to competition at the 2026 Pan American Championships. She only competed on vault and helped Brazil win silver as a team. During event finals Andrade won gold on vault ahead of Lia Monica Fontaine. She next competed at the Szombathely World Challenge Cup where she won silver on balance beam.

In October, Andrade competed at the 2026 World Championships with the Brazilian team alongside Flávia Saraiva, Lorrane Oliveira, Thaís Fidélis, and Sophia Weisberg. During the team final she contributed scores on vault and balance beam towards Brazil's fifth place finish. Individually she qualified for the vault final where she won the gold medal ahead of Claire Pease and Skye Blakely.

== Personal life ==
Andrade achieved celebrity status in Brazil after her success at the 2020 Summer Olympic Games. Three months after the Games in October 2021, she appeared on the cover of Vogue Brasil. She was also awarded the Brazil Olympic Prize which recognized her as the best Brazilian female athlete of the year from 2021 to 2024.

Andrade was in a relationship with bodybuilder Luiz Cleiton from June 2022 to 2024.

She has worked with psychologist Aline Wolff since she was 13 years old and wants to study psychology herself.

Andrade underwent three ACL reconstruction surgeries, all on her right knee. Her main idol in gymnastics is the Brazilian world champion Daiane dos Santos.

== Selected skills ==
Apparatus	Name	Description
Vault	Baitova	Yurchenko Double Full (DTY)
Vault	Amanar	Yurchenko entry, laid out salto backwards with 2½ twists
Vault	Cheng	Yurchenko half-on entry, laid out salto forwards with 1½ twists
Uneven Bars	Maloney	Toe-on Shaposhnikova transition from low bar-to-high bar
Uneven Bars	Van Leeuwen	Toe-on Shaposhnikova transition with ½ twist to high bar
Uneven Bars	Jaeger	Forward salto piked
Uneven Bars	Tkatchev piked	Reverse hecht piked same-bar release into a Pak
Uneven Bars	Chusovitina	Full-twisting double tuck dismount
Balance Beam	Switch leap	Switch split mount
Balance Beam	Double Pike	Dismount: Double piked salto backwards
Floor Exercise	Memmel	2/1 turn (720°) with free leg held upward in 180° split position
Floor Exercise	Chusovitina	Double layout 1/1
Floor Exercise	Double Layout	Double Layout salto backwards

== Competitive history ==
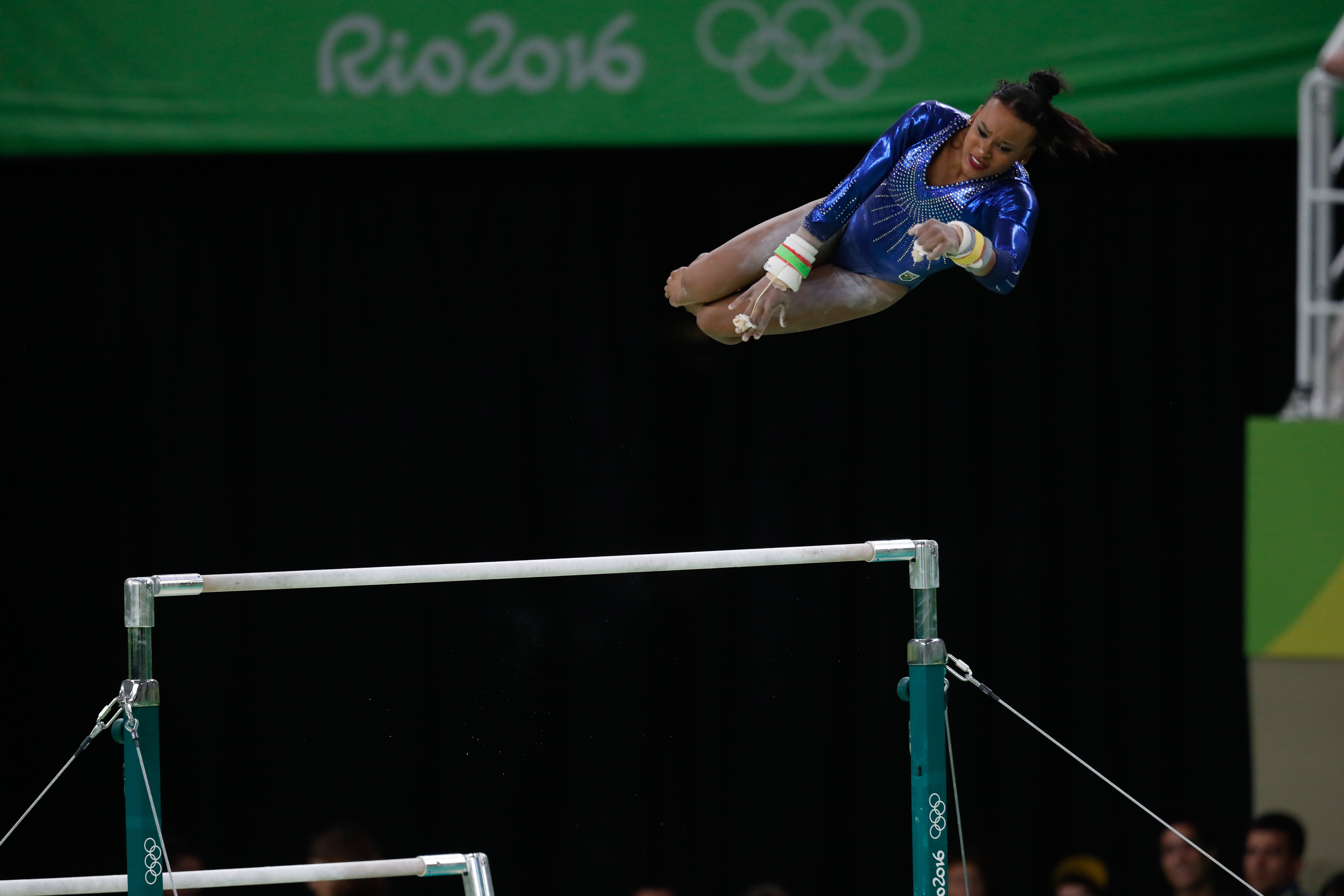
Andrade performing her uneven bars dismount at the 2016 Olympic Games

Competitive history of Rebeca Andrade at the junior level
Year	Event	Team	AA	VT	UB	BB	FX
2012
2012	Junior Pan American Championships	2nd place, silver medalist(s)	1st place, gold medalist(s)	1st place, gold medalist(s)	4	3rd place, bronze medalist(s)	1st place, gold medalist(s)
2012	Junior South American Championships	1st place, gold medalist(s)	1st place, gold medalist(s)				
2012	Trophy Brazil		1st place, gold medalist(s)				
2013	Nadia Comaneci Invitational		1st place, gold medalist(s)				
2013	Junior South American Championships	1st place, gold medalist(s)	3rd place, bronze medalist(s)	1st place, gold medalist(s)	1st place, gold medalist(s)	2nd place, silver medalist(s)	
2013	Gymnasiade	2nd place, silver medalist(s)	3rd place, bronze medalist(s)	1st place, gold medalist(s)			6
2014	WOGA Classic	2nd place, silver medalist(s)	1st place, gold medalist(s)	1st place, gold medalist(s)	1st place, gold medalist(s)	2nd place, silver medalist(s)	2nd place, silver medalist(s)
2014	Junior Pan American Championships	2nd place, silver medalist(s)	2nd place, silver medalist(s)	1st place, gold medalist(s)	1st place, gold medalist(s)	1st place, gold medalist(s)	2nd place, silver medalist(s)

Andrade at the vault medal ceremony at the 2026 World Championships

Competitive history of Rebeca Andrade at the senior level
Year	Event	Team	AA	VT	UB	BB	FX
2015	Ljubljana World Challenge Cup				3rd place, bronze medalist(s)		
2015	São Paulo World Challenge Cup			2nd place, silver medalist(s)	7		
2015	Flanders Team Challenge	3rd place, bronze medalist(s)	2nd place, silver medalist(s)				
2016	City of Jesolo Trophy	2nd place, silver medalist(s)			8		
2016	Doha World Challenge Cup				2nd place, silver medalist(s)		
2016	Olympic Test Event	1st place, gold medalist(s)			3rd place, bronze medalist(s)		
2016	São Paulo World Challenge Cup				2nd place, silver medalist(s)	3rd place, bronze medalist(s)	
2016	Anadia World Challenge Cup					2nd place, silver medalist(s)	2nd place, silver medalist(s)
2016	Dutch Olympic Qualifier		1st place, gold medalist(s)				
2016	Olympic Games	8	11				
2016	Brazilian Championships		1st place, gold medalist(s)		1st place, gold medalist(s)	1st place, gold medalist(s)	2nd place, silver medalist(s)
2017	City of Jesolo Trophy	2nd place, silver medalist(s)	2nd place, silver medalist(s)		5	6	4
2017	Koper World Challenge Cup			1st place, gold medalist(s)			
2017	Brazilian Championships				1st place, gold medalist(s)		
2017	Varna World Challenge Cup			1st place, gold medalist(s)	1st place, gold medalist(s)		
2018
2018	Pan American Championships	2nd place, silver medalist(s)					
2018	World Championships	7			R2		
2018	Cottbus World Cup			1st place, gold medalist(s)	2nd place, silver medalist(s)	1st place, gold medalist(s)	
2019	DTB Team Challenge	1st place, gold medalist(s)	1st place, gold medalist(s)				
2020	Baku World Cup				3	2	
2021
2021	Pan American Championships	1st place, gold medalist(s)	1st place, gold medalist(s)				
2021	Doha World Cup				1st place, gold medalist(s)	3rd place, bronze medalist(s)	
2021	Olympic Games		2nd place, silver medalist(s)	1st place, gold medalist(s)			5
2021	Brazilian Championships	1st place, gold medalist(s)	1st place, gold medalist(s)				
2021	World Championships			1st place, gold medalist(s)	2nd place, silver medalist(s)	6	
2022	Trophy Brazil				1st place, gold medalist(s)	2nd place, silver medalist(s)	
2022	Pan American Championships	1st place, gold medalist(s)			1st place, gold medalist(s)	2nd place, silver medalist(s)	
2022	Brazilian Championships	1st place, gold medalist(s)	1st place, gold medalist(s)		1st place, gold medalist(s)	1st place, gold medalist(s)	2nd place, silver medalist(s)
2022	Paris World Challenge Cup				2nd place, silver medalist(s)		
2022	World Championships	4	1st place, gold medalist(s)	R3	8	8	3rd place, bronze medalist(s)
2023	Brazilian Championships	1st place, gold medalist(s)			1st place, gold medalist(s)	1st place, gold medalist(s)	
2023	Paris World Challenge Cup				2nd place, silver medalist(s)		
2023	World Championships	2nd place, silver medalist(s)	2nd place, silver medalist(s)	1st place, gold medalist(s)		3rd place, bronze medalist(s)	2nd place, silver medalist(s)
2023	Pan American Games	2nd place, silver medalist(s)		1st place, gold medalist(s)	2nd place, silver medalist(s)	1st place, gold medalist(s)	
2024	Antalya World Challenge Cup				2nd place, silver medalist(s)		
2024	City of Jesolo Trophy	2nd place, silver medalist(s)			1st place, gold medalist(s)	2nd place, silver medalist(s)	
2024	Brazil Trophy				1st place, gold medalist(s)	1st place, gold medalist(s)	
2024	Olympic Games	3rd place, bronze medalist(s)	2nd place, silver medalist(s)	2nd place, silver medalist(s)	R2	4	1st place, gold medalist(s)
2024	Brazilian Championships	1st place, gold medalist(s)			1st place, gold medalist(s)		
2026
2026	Pan American Championships	2nd place, silver medalist(s)		1st place, gold medalist(s)			
2026	Szombathely World Challenge Cup					2nd place, silver medalist(s)	
2026	World Championships	5		1st place, gold medalist(s)			

== Floor music ==
Year	Music Title
2013	"Sway"
2014–2016	"Crazy in Love" and "Single Ladies"
2019–2022	"Toccata and Fugue in D minor, BWV 565" and "Baile de Favela"
2023–2024	"End of Time", "Movimento da Sanfoninha" and "Baile de Favela"

== Awards and honors ==
In December 2024, Rebeca Andrade was included on the BBC's 100 Women list.

In April 2025, Andrade won the Laureus World Sports Award for Comeback of the Year, for her resilience in overcoming multiple injuries, including three ACL tears, to become Brazil's most decorated Olympian in history at Paris 2024.

In late 2025, Rebeca Andrade was honored with a mural at CEU Butantã, in the western part of São Paulo. The artwork, titled “Rebeca Andrade: Body that Flies, Root that Remains,” is part of the MAR 2025 program of the São Paulo City Hall, which aims to promote urban art in public spaces.

The painting, created by the artist Bruna Moreira, known as Bromou, occupies the facade of the educational unit and measures 22 meters wide by 17 meters high.

== Filmography ==
On September 12, 2025, the sportswear brand Adidas released a documentary that centers on Andrade’s long-standing working relationship with her coach, Francisco Porath, commonly known as Xico. According to a press release issued by Adidas, the production offers a personal perspective on the people who support the athlete and serve as a consistent and positive influence throughout her career. Through interviews and observational footage, the film explores the dynamics of coaching, trust, and collaboration within high-performance sport.

The documentary was released on YouTube and highlights their professional collaboration within the context of Andrade’s achievements at the international level. The film is part of Illuminated, a documentary series produced by Adidas that profiles elite athletes and the individuals who play significant roles in their professional journeys.
