= Gymnastics at the 2023 Pan American Games – Women's vault =

Women's vault at the 2023 Pan American Games
- Venue: Training Center for Collective Sport
- Dates: October 24
- Competitors: 8 from 6 nations
- Winning score: 14.983

Medalists
Gold medal	Rebeca Andrade	Brazil
Silver medal	Jordan Chiles	United States
Bronze medal	Natalia Escalera	Mexico

The women's vault gymnastic event at the 2023 Pan American Games was held on October 24 at the Training Center for Collective Sport.

== Results ==
=== Final ===
Rank	Gymnast	Vault 1				Vault 2				Total
Rank	Gymnast	D Score	E Score	Pen.	Score 1	D Score	E Score	Pen.	Score 2	Total
1st place, gold medalist(s)	Rebeca Andrade (BRA)	5.6	9.733		15.333	5.0	9.633		14.633	14.983
2nd place, silver medalist(s)	Jordan Chiles (USA)	5.0	9.400		14.400	4.8	9.100		13.900	14.150
3rd place, bronze medalist(s)	Natalia Escalera (MEX)	4.6	9.000		13.600	4.4	8.666		13.066	13.333
4	Ahtziri Sandoval (MEX)	5.2	8.633		13.833	4.0	8.600		12.600	13.216
5	Franchesca Santi (CHI)	5.0	7.500	0.3	12.200	4.4	8.366		12.766	12.483
6	Camil Betances (DOM)	4.2	8.466		12.666	3.8	8.333	0.1	12.033	12.349
7	Lucila Estarli (ARG)	4.4	8.366		12.766	3.8	7.666	0.3	11.166	11.966
8	Makarena Pinto (CHI)	4.6	8.200	0.3	12.500	4.4	7.333	0.3	11.433	11.966

=== Qualification ===
Rank	Gymnast	Vault 1				Vault 2				Total	Qual.
Rank	Gymnast	D Score	E Score	Pen.	Score 1	D Score	E Score	Pen.	Score 2	Total	Qual.
1	Rebeca Andrade (BRA)	5.600	9.500		15.100	5.000	9.533		14.533	14.816	Q
2	Jordan Chiles (USA)	5.000	9.366		14.366	4.800	9.133	0.1	13.833	14.099	Q
3	Ahtziri Sandoval (MEX)	5.200	8.666		13.866	4.000	8.633		12.633	13.249	Q
4	Natalia Escalera (MEX)	4.600	8.766		13.366	4.400	8.566		12.966	13.166	Q
5	Makarena Pinto (CHI)	4.600	8.166		12.766	4.400	8.400		12.800	12.783	Q
6	Lucila Estarli (ARG)	4.400	8.366		12.766	3.800	8.333	0.1	12.033	12.399	Q
7	Camil Betances (DOM)	4.200	8.433		12.633	3.800	8.300		12.100	12.366	Q
8	Franchesca Santi (CHI)	4.200	8.433		12.633	3.800	8.200		12.000	12.316	Q
9	Alexa Grande (ESA)	4.200	8.333		12.533	3.400	8.233		11.633	12.083	R1
10	Franciny Morales (CRC)	4.200	8.466		12.666	3.800	7.300		11.100	11.883	R2
11	Diana Vasquez (BOL)	4.200	8.300		12.500	3.600	7.233		10.833	11.666	R3
