= Jenny Ruiz-Williams =

US–born Mexican international footballer (born 1983)

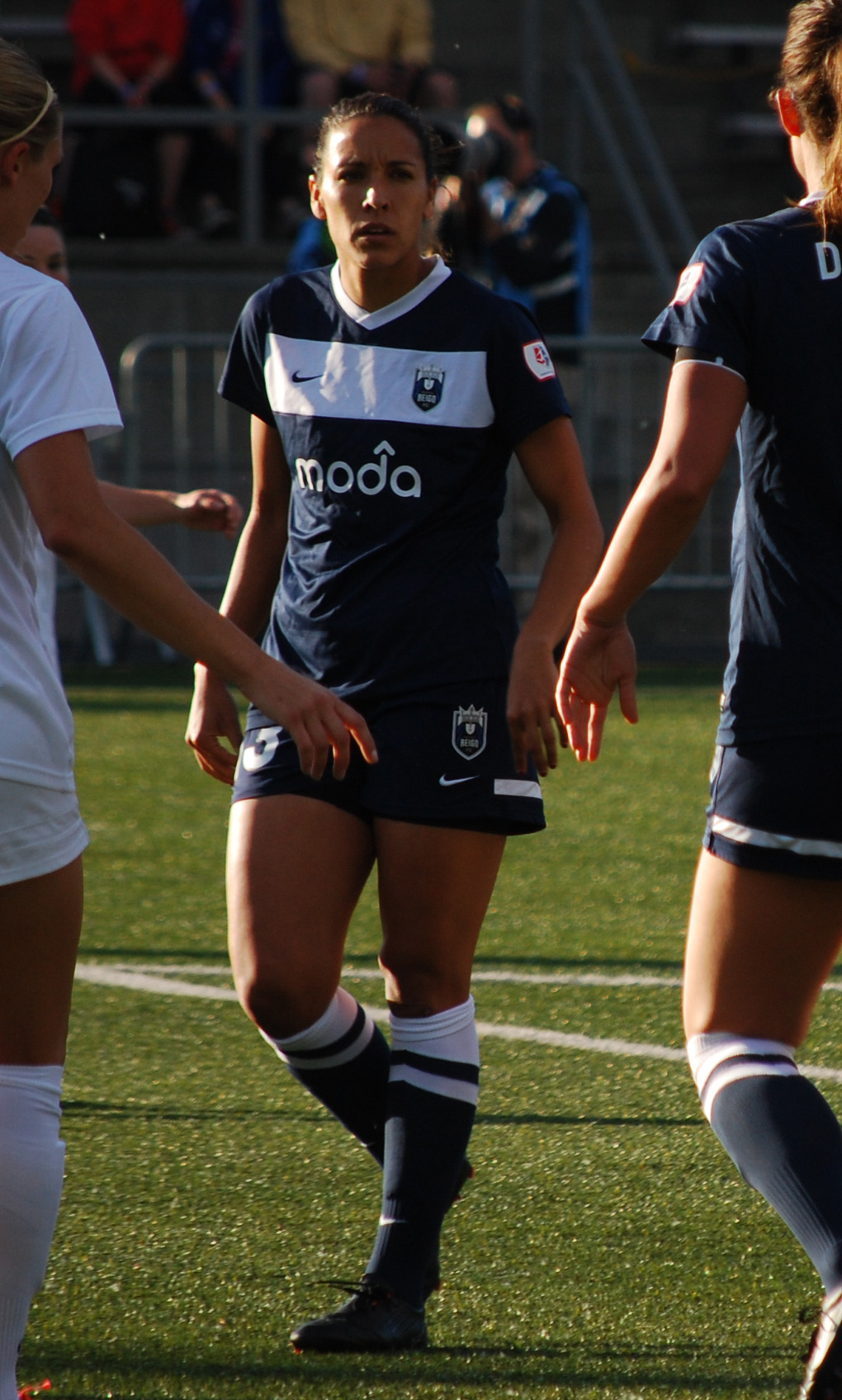
- Ruiz-Williams playing for Seattle Reign FC in 2013

Personal information
- Full name: Jennifer Marie Ruiz Brown
- Date of birth: 9 August 1983 (age 43)
- Place of birth: Anaheim, California, United States
- Height: 1.67 m (5 ft 6 in)
- Position: Defender

Team information
- Current team: UNLV Rebels (head coach)

College career
Years	Team	Apps	(Gls)
2001–2004	UNLV Rebels		

Senior career*
Years	Team	Apps	(Gls)
2012	Bay Area Breeze		
2013	Seattle Reign FC	7	(0)

International career^{‡}
2003–2016	Mexico	36	(4)

Managerial career
- 2018: Cal State Northridge Matadors (assistant)
- 2019: Oregon State Beavers (assistant)
- 2020–: UNLV Rebels
- * Club domestic league appearances and goals as of 20 August 2013 ‡ National team caps and goals as of 09:44, 18 June 2015 (UTC)

Jennifer Marie Ruiz Brown (born 9 August 1983), known in the United States as Jenny Ruiz-Williams, is a US-born Mexican football coach and former professional player who played as a defender. She is currently the head coach of the UNLV Rebels women's soccer team. As a player, Ruiz-Williams played for Seattle Reign FC of the National Women's Soccer League (NWSL) and the Mexico women's national football team.

== Early life ==
Ruiz-Williams was born in Anaheim, California and attended Corona High School in Corona, California. At Corona, she was a Mountain View All-League selection and three-time MVP. In 1998, she was selected to the 1998 Mountain View First Team. She played with the Olympic Development Program district and state team in 1998 and 1999. In 2001, she was named Citrus Belt 2001 Athlete of the Year and 2001 Corona-NorCo District Athlete of the Year.

In 2000, Ruiz-Williams played with the Southern California Blues U-16 and helped the team win a national title. She helped the Southern California Blues U-17 team place second at the National Championship.

== College career ==
Ruiz-Williams attended the University of Nevada, Las Vegas and played for its women's soccer team from 2001 to 2004. During her freshman year in 2001, she played in 20 games of the season with one start against Kansas in which she scored two goals. She scored a last-minute goal against league rival BYU in the Mountain West Conference championship game.

In 2003, as part of the team's defense that allowed just 27 goals the entire season, Ruiz-Williams helped the team tie the school record. She was named to both the All-MWC Second Team, and to the MWC All-Tournament Team.

In 2004, Ruiz-Williams started 18 of 18 games (missing one game due to a red card) and led a defense that only allowed 15 goals all season (0.76 per game). She was named to the Soccer Buzz Team All-Region, First Team All Mountain West Conference, and First Team Mountain West Conference Tournament teams.

== Club career ==
=== Bay Area Breeze ===
From 2011 to 2012, Ruiz-Williams played for the Bay Area Breeze in the Women's Premier Soccer League. As captain of the 2012 team, she scored four goals and started all 10 games in the WPSL season and all 4 games during the UK tour. Ruiz-Williams led an offense from the attacking midfield position that went 4–0 on the UK tour. She scored a goal and had an assist in the team's 2–0 victory over Liverpool L.F.C.

During the 2011 season with the Breeze, Ruiz-Williams signed for the last game of the season and playoffs and helped the team win the WPSL Pacific North Division Championship.

=== Seattle Reign FC ===
In 2013, as part of the NWSL Player Allocation, Ruiz-Williams joined Seattle Reign FC in the NWSL. She made seven appearances for the club during the inaugural season, tallying 386 minutes on the defensive line.

== International career ==
As of December 2012, Ruiz-Williams has 22 caps with the Mexico women's national football team and three goals. She began training with the Mexico women's national football team in 2003 and played in the 2003 Australia Cup. She had seven full international caps for the team that qualified for the 2004 Summer Olympics in Athens, Greece.

In 2011, after a seven-year hiatus from soccer, Ruiz-Williams returned to the national team and scored the game-winning goal against Colombia in the Pan American Games, resulting in the team winning the bronze medal. This was Mexico's second bronze medal for women's soccer at the Pan American Games.

In January 2012, Ruiz-Williams represented Mexico at the CONCACAF Olympic Qualifiers in Vancouver, British Columbia, scoring two goals and providing one assist.

== Coaching career ==
In June 2012, Ruiz-Williams was a guest coach at the Julie Foudy Leadership Academy. She also coached for the Palo Alto Soccer Club, until she moved to Tennessee.

Ruiz-Williams became the head coach at her alma mater in December 2019. She previously served as assistant coach at Oregon State Beavers and Cal State Northridge Matadors.

== Personal ==
Ruiz-Williams is married to Kevin Williams and together they are parents of two children.

During a hiatus from soccer after graduating from UNLV, Ruiz-Williams taught two years in the inner-city of Los Angeles, California with Teach for America (AmeriCorps). She later moved to Brazil, where her second child was born, and worked alongside her husband as Christian missionaries in the interior of the country.

== See also ==
- List of Mexican Fútbol (soccer) athletes
- List of 2011 Pan American Games medal winners
- List of University of Nevada, Las Vegas alumni
