= Kirk Brown =

American businessman

- Born: Newberg, Oregon, U.S.
- Education: University of Nevada, Las Vegas
- Occupation: Co-founder of ZoomInfo (previously DiscoverOrg)
- Known for: Co-founding ZoomInfo

Kirk Brown co-founded ZoomInfo (previously known as DiscoverOrg).

== Early life and education ==
Brown is from Newberg, Oregon. He attended Newberg High School, then the University of Nevada, Las Vegas.

== Personal life ==
Brown lives in Vancouver, Washington, as of 2022. He is a billionaire.

== See also ==
- List of people from Vancouver, Washington
- List of University of Nevada, Las Vegas, alumni
- Portland Fire
