= Gymnastics at the 2024 Summer Olympics – Women's floor =

Women's floor at the Games of the XXXIII Olympiad
- Olympic artistic gymnastics
- Venue: Accor Arena
- Dates: 28 July 2024 (qualifying); 5 August 2024 (final)
- Competitors: 9 from 6 nations
- Winning score: 14.166

Medalists
1st place, gold medalist(s)		Rebeca Andrade	Brazil
2nd place, silver medalist(s)		Simone Biles	United States
3rd place, bronze medalist(s)		Ana Bărbosu	Romania

The women's floor event at the 2024 Summer Olympics was held on 28 July and 5 August 2024 at the Accor Arena (referred to as the Bercy Arena due to IOC sponsorship rules). 76 gymnasts from 33 nations (of the 95 total gymnasts) competed on floor in the qualifying round.

== Background ==
This was the 20th appearance of the event, after making its debut at the 1952 Summer Olympics. 2016 champion Simone Biles qualified for the final for a third consecutive Olympics. However, she only competed in the event final for a second time after pulling out of the 2020 final due to the twisties. The defending gold medalist Jade Carey also competed in the qualifying round but did not advance after falling on one of her tumbling passes. She later revealed she had not been feeling well in the days leading up to qualification.

== Qualification ==
A National Olympic Committee (NOC) could enter up to 5 qualified gymnasts. A total of 95 quota places are allocated to women's artistic gymnastics.

The 12 teams that qualified were able to send 5 gymnasts in the team competition, for a total of 60 of the 95 quota places. The top three teams at the 2022 World Artistic Gymnastics Championships (the United States, Great Britain, and Canada) and the top nine teams (excluding those already qualified) at the 2023 World Artistic Gymnastics Championships (China, Brazil, Italy, the Netherlands, France, Japan, Australia, Romania, and South Korea) earned team qualification places.

The remaining 35 quota places are awarded individually. Each gymnast can only earn one place. These places are filled through various criteria based on the 2023 World Championships, the 2024 FIG Artistic Gymnastics World Cup series, continental championships, a reallocation guarantee and a Tripartite Commission invitation.

Each of the 95 qualified gymnasts are eligible for the floor competition, but many gymnasts do not compete in each of the apparatus events.

== Competition format ==
The top 8 qualifiers in the qualification phase (limit two per NOC) advanced to the apparatus final. The finalists performed on the floor again. Qualification scores were then ignored, with only final round scores counting. Due to a tie in qualifying scores between Rina Kishi and Ana Bărbosu, 9 gymnasts advanced to the final round.

== Schedule ==
Date	Time	Round	Subdivision
28 July	09:30	Qualification	Subdivision 1
28 July	11:40	Qualification	Subdivision 2
28 July	14:50	Qualification	Subdivision 3
28 July	18:00	Qualification	Subdivision 4
28 July	21:10	Qualification	Subdivision 5
5 August	14:25	Final	–
All times are Central European Summer Time (UTC+02:00)

== Results ==
=== Qualifying ===
Relationship between Difficulty Score (D Score) and Execution Score (E Score) in the 2024 Olympic Qualifying Women's Floor Exercise routines, illustrating the distribution of scores across gymnasts.

The gymnasts who ranked in the top eight qualified for the final round. In a case where more than two gymnasts from the same NOC were in the top eight, the last ranked among them would not qualify to final round. The next-best ranked gymnast would qualify instead.

Rank	Gymnast	D Score	E Score	Pen.	Total	Qual.
1	Simone Biles (USA)	6.8	7.900	0.100	14.600	Q
2	Rebeca Andrade (BRA)	5.9	8.000		13.900	Q
3	Jordan Chiles (USA)	5.8	8.066		13.866	Q
4	Sabrina Voinea (ROU)	6.2	7.600		13.800	Q
5	Alice D'Amato (ITA)	5.6	8.100		13.700	Q
6	Ou Yushan (CHN)	5.6	8.066		13.666	Q
7	Manila Esposito (ITA)	5.7	7.933		13.633	Q
8 (Note: Rina Kishi and Ana Bărbosu tied for eighth place on the floor exercise. Because they both had the same D-score (5.6) and the same E-score (8.000), the tie was unable to be broken, meaning nine gymnasts qualified for the floor exercise final)	Rina Kishi (JPN)	5.6	8.000		13.600	Q
8	Ana Bărbosu (ROU)	5.6	8.000		13.600	Q
10	Zhang Yihan (CHN)	5.5	8.033		13.533	R1
11	Júlia Soares (BRA)	5.4	8.100		13.500	R2
12	Jade Barbosa (BRA)	5.5	8.000		13.500	–
13	Angela Andreoli (ITA)	5.8	7.700		13.500	–
14	Zhou Yaqin (CHN)	5.5	7.966		13.466	–
15	Ellie Black (CAN)	5.6	7.900	0.100	13.400	R3

Reserves

The reserves for the floor event final were:

1. Zhang Yihan (CHN)
2. Júlia Soares (BRA)
3. Ellie Black (CAN)

Only two gymnasts from each country may advance to the floor final. Gymnasts who did not qualify for the final or reserve positions because of the quota, but had high enough scores to do so were:

- Jade Barbosa (BRA)
- Angela Andreoli (ITA)
- Zhou Yaqin (CHN)

=== Final ===
Rank	Gymnast	D Score	E Score	Pen.	Total
1st place, gold medalist(s)	Rebeca Andrade (BRA)	5.9	8.266		14.166
2nd place, silver medalist(s)	Simone Biles (USA)	6.9	7.833	0.600	14.133
3rd place, bronze medalist(s)	Ana Bărbosu (ROU)	5.8	8.000	0.100	13.700
4	Sabrina Voinea (ROU)	5.9	7.900	0.100	13.700
5	Jordan Chiles (USA)	5.8	7.866		13.666
6	Alice D'Amato (ITA)	5.6	8.100	0.100	13.600
7	Rina Kishi (JPN)	5.7	7.566	0.100	13.166
8	Ou Yushan (CHN)	5.6	7.700	0.300	13.000
9	Manila Esposito (ITA)	5.7	6.533	0.100	12.133

== Controversy ==
American gymnast Jordan Chiles, who was the last competitor to perform in the final, initially received a score of 13.666, which put her in fifth place directly behind Romanian gymnasts Ana Bărbosu and Sabrina Voinea who each received a score of 13.700 with Bărbosu winning the execution-score tie-breaker. Chiles's coach, Cécile Canqueteau-Landi, filed an inquiry on Chiles's score which resulted in a review that increased her difficulty score by a tenth (0.1) – it was adjusted to 5.9 from 5.8. Therefore the overall score was upgraded to 13.766, moving her from fifth into a bronze medal position. Further controversy arose when it was revealed that Voinea had received a 0.1 point deduction for going out of bounds. The replay showed that Voinea may not have gone out of bounds. If the deduction was not taken, Voinea would have scored 13.800, which would have put her in the bronze medal position even after Chiles's score was increased.

Former Romanian Olympic gymnast, Nadia Comăneci, and Mihai Covaliu, president of the Romanian Olympic and Sports Committee, requested that Morinari Watanabe, the president of the International Gymnastics Federation (FIG), allow for Voinea's floor exercise to be re-analyzed. The Prime Minister of Romania, Marcel Ciolacu, stated that he would boycott the closing ceremony due to "the scandalous situation in the gymnastics, where [Romanian] athletes were treated in an absolutely dishonorable manner".

Subsequently, Bărbosu and Voinea both appealed to the Court of Arbitration for Sport (CAS). Bărbosu appealed that Chiles's inquiry was filed twenty-four seconds after the one-minute deadline, and therefore should not have been reviewed in the first place. On August 10, five days after the final, the CAS found that Chiles' inquiry was filed beyond the 1-minute deadline specified in art. 8.5 of FIG 2024 Technical Regulations, with the official Omega system time clocking the inquiry at 1 minute and 4 seconds. The CAS therefore ruled that the "initial score of 13.666 given to Ms Jordan Chiles in the final of the women's floor exercise shall be reinstated" and ordered the FIG to determine the ranking of the final and "assign the medal(s) in accordance with the above decision." Voinea's appeal was simultaneously rejected. The FIG reinstated the original standings, which led to Bărbosu placing third, Voinea placing fourth, and Chiles placing fifth.

Later that day, Bărbosu posted on her Instagram a message to Voinea and Chiles saying that "my thoughts are with you. I know what you are feeling, because I've been through the same. [...] This situation would not have existed if the persons in charge had respected the regulation. We, athletes are not to be blamed, and the hate directed to us is painful."

"I can't help but think about Sabrina and Jordan right now. It's a difficult situation for us, with so many uncertainties and overwhelming emotions. I hope everyone understands that we have not done anything wrong at the Olympics. And that the Olympic spirit is more important than any misunderstanding between authorities. I want to believe that the day will come when all three of us will receive a bronze medal each."

— Ana Bărbosu when receiving her bronze medal

On 11 August 2024, the International Olympic Committee (IOC) formally confirmed the new rankings and ordered that Chiles return the bronze medal and it be reallocated to Bărbosu. USA Gymnastics (USAG) appealed the ruling later that day, saying they had video evidence that Chiles' coach had appealed her score at 47 seconds, within the one-minute deadline, and not four seconds late, requesting reinstatement of the 13.766 score. On August 12, the CAS denied a request to reconsider its ruling. Chiles appealed the decision to the Federal Supreme Court of Switzerland.

The Romanian Federation eventually proposed that there could be three bronze medals awarded one each to Bărbosu, Voinea and Chiles, given the complicated nature of the situation, but the proposal never went ahead.

On 16 August 2024, Bărbosu was officially awarded the Olympic bronze medal in her hometown of Focșani.

On January 29, 2026, the Federal Supreme Court of Switzerland partially overturned the CAS ruling, finding that new audio-visual evidence could show that the U.S. coach's scoring inquiry was submitted within the required one-minute time limit, and returned the case to CAS for reconsideration. Additionally, they rejected Voinea's appeal.
