= Jordan Chiles =

American artistic gymnast (born 2001)

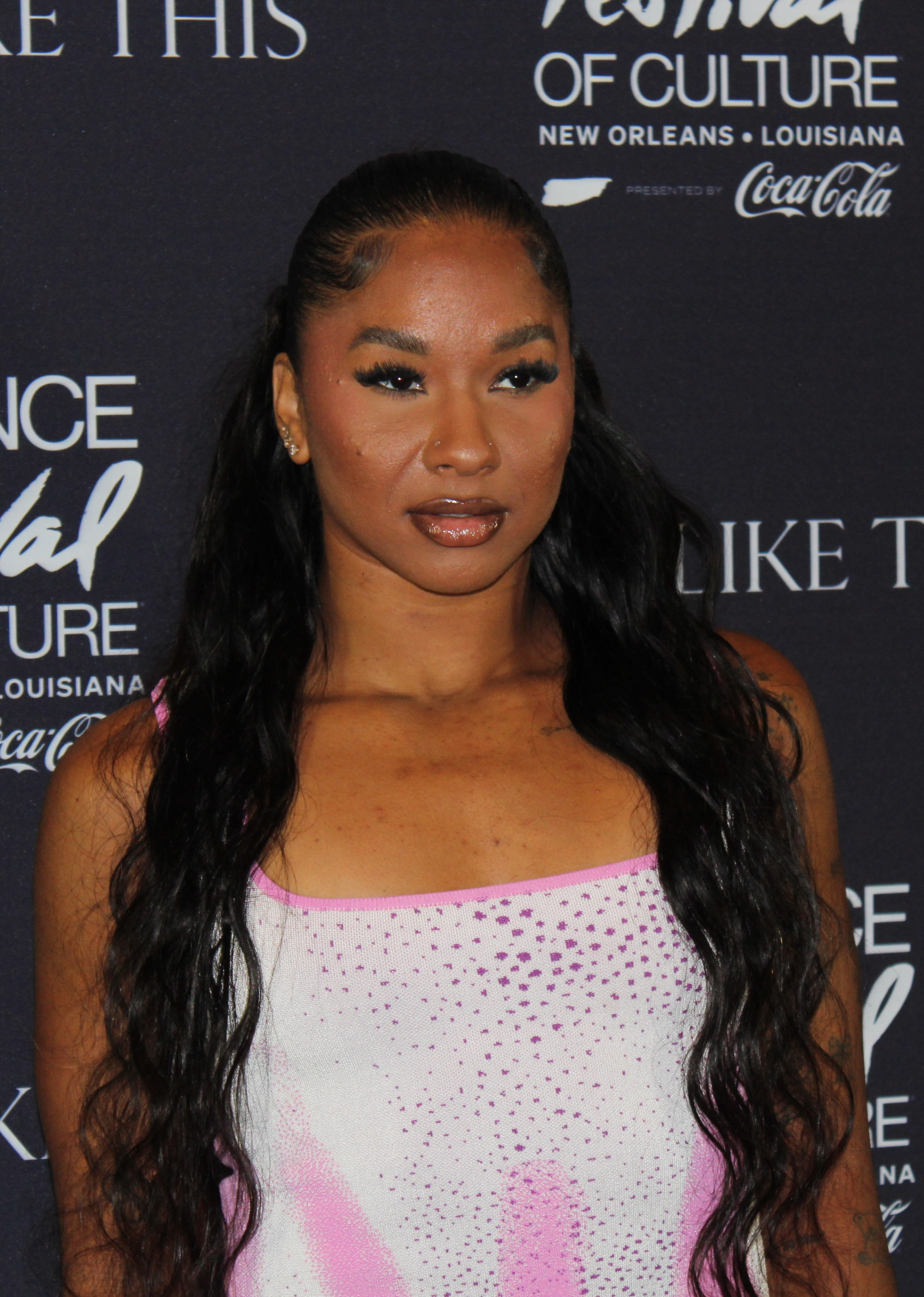
- Chiles at the 2025 Essence Festival of Culture

Personal information
- Full name: Jordan Lucella Elizabeth Chiles
- Nickname: Chick
- Born: April 15, 2001 (age 25) Tualatin, Oregon, U.S.
- Height: 4 ft 11 in (150 cm)

Gymnastics career
- Discipline: Women's artistic gymnastics
- Country represented: United States; (2013–2024)
- College team: UCLA Bruins (2022–23, 2025–26)
- Gym: World Champions Centre; Naydenov (former)
- Head coaches: Laurent Landi (club); Janelle McDonald (NCAA)
- Assistant coach: Cecile Canqueteau-Landi
- Former coach: Chris Waller
Medal record
Event	1st	2nd	3rd
Olympic Games	1	1	0
World Championships	1	2	0
NCAA Championships	4	3	0
Total	6	6	0
Women's artistic gymnastics
Representing the United States
Olympic Games
Gold medal – first place	2024 Paris	Team
Silver medal – second place	2020 Tokyo	Team
World Championships
Gold medal – first place	2022 Liverpool	Team
Silver medal – second place	2022 Liverpool	Vault
Silver medal – second place	2022 Liverpool	Floor Exercise
Pan American Games
Gold medal – first place	2023 Santiago	Team
Silver medal – second place	2023 Santiago	Vault
Bronze medal – third place	2023 Santiago	All-Around
Pacific Rim Championships
Gold medal – first place	2018 Medellín	Team
Gold medal – first place	2018 Medellín	Vault
Gold medal – first place	2018 Medellín	Floor Exercise
Bronze medal – third place	2018 Medellín	Balance Beam
FIG World Cup
Event	1st	2nd	3rd
All-Around World Cup	0	0	1
World Challenge Cup	1	1	0
Representing the UCLA Bruins
NCAA Championships
Gold medal – first place	2023 Fort Worth	Uneven Bars
Gold medal – first place	2023 Fort Worth	Floor Exercise
Gold medal – first place	2025 Fort Worth	Uneven Bars
Gold medal – first place	2026 Fort Worth	Floor Exercise
Silver medal – second place	2023 Fort Worth	All-Around
Silver medal – second place	2025 Fort Worth	Team
Silver medal – second place	2026 Fort Worth	Balance Beam

Jordan Lucella Elizabeth Chiles (born April 15, 2001) is an American artistic gymnast. She was a member of the gold medal-winning team at the 2024 Summer Olympics, having previously been a member of the silver medal-winning team at the 2020 Summer Olympics. She was also a member of the team that won gold at the 2022 World Championships. Individually, she was the 2022 World vault and floor exercise silver medalist. She has been a member of the United States women's national gymnastics team since 2013. In NCAA Gymnastics, Chiles competes for the UCLA Bruins gymnastics team, where she has won two Pac-12, two Big Ten titles, and three NCAA championship titles. She is one of four female gymnasts to win NCAA, World, and Olympic championship titles, alongside Kyla Ross, Madison Kocian, and Sunisa Lee.

== Personal life ==
Chiles was born in Tualatin, Oregon, on April 15, 2001, to Timothy and Gina Chiles (née Velasquez). Her father is Black and her mother is Latina. She was named after American basketball player Michael Jordan. She is one of five children; her siblings are Jazmin, Jade, Tajmen, and Tyrus.

She grew up in Vancouver, Washington, but moved to Spring, Texas, in 2019 to train alongside American gymnast and Olympic medalist Simone Biles at the World Champions Centre.

Following the Tokyo Olympics in 2021, Chiles’ mother served time in federal prison for embezzlement. That same year, Chiles started her collegiate gymnastics career at the University of California, Los Angeles. She put her studies on hold after the 2023 NCAA season to focus on the 2024 Paris Olympics. She confirmed that she will return to UCLA for the 2025 season.

In 2023, Chiles's aunt and grandfather died, and she shared how mentally challenging that time was with the official Olympic channel during the 2024 Games. She remarked that her grandfather would not want her to quit and that was her motivation.

In the fall of 2025, Chiles competed on the television show Dancing With the Stars. She was placed with Ezra Sosa during Season 34, and they finished the competition in third place.

== Junior gymnastics career ==
=== 2013–2014 ===
Chiles made her elite debut at the 2013 American Classic where she won the bronze medal in the all-around behind Ariana Agrapides and Laurie Hernandez and the silver medal on vault behind Felicia Hano. At the 2013 P&G National Championships, Chiles finished eleventh in the all-around with a total score of 108.050, and she also finished sixth on vault. She was selected to be a member of the Junior National Team.

Chiles made her international debut at the 2014 City of Jesolo Trophy. She won a gold medal with the team and finished sixth in the all-around. In the event finals, Chiles placed second on vault behind her teammate Bailie Key. At the 2014 Secret U.S. Classic, Chiles won the all-around competition with a score of 57.350. She then competed at the 2014 U.S. National Championships where she finished fourth in the all-around. She won the bronze medals on both the vault and the floor exercise. She was once again named to the Junior National Team.

=== 2015–2016 ===
After a tough competition, Chiles placed eighth in the all-around at the 2015 U.S. Classic. She tied with Jazmyn Foberg for the bronze medal on the uneven bars. She finished fourth in the all-around and won the gold medal on the vault at the 2015 U.S. National Championships and was once again selected for the junior national team.

Chiles competed at the 2016 International Gymnix in Montreal alongside Emma Malabuyo, Gabby Perea, and Deanne Soza, and they won the gold medal in the junior team competition. Chiles then won the gold medal in the vault event final. She then won the junior all-around title at the 2016 City of Jesolo Trophy. In the event finals, she won the gold medal on vault, tied with Emma Malabuyo for the silver medal on the uneven bars, finished fifth on the balance beam, and eighth on the floor exercise. At the 2016 U.S. Classic, she finished fourth in the all-around and won the gold medal on vault.

== Senior gymnastics career ==
=== 2017 ===
Chiles made her senior debut at the American Classic where she only competed on the uneven bars and the balance beam and finished fourth and fifth, respectively. At the U.S. Classic, she finished fifth in the all-around. In August, Chiles competed at the U.S. National Championships where she placed second in the all-around behind Ragan Smith, in addition to a fourth-place finish on the balance beam. During her balance beam performance she flubbed a wolf turn but saved it by connecting it to an unplanned triple turn. In September, Chiles was selected as the non-traveling alternate for the World Championships.

=== 2018 ===
On March 18, Chiles made her senior international debut at the Stuttgart World Cup where she placed third behind Jin Zhang of China and Elisabeth Seitz of Germany, posting the highest scores of the competition on vault and floor. On April 8, Chiles was named to the team to compete at the Pacific Rim Championships. There she won team gold as well as gold on vault and floor exercise and bronze on the balance beam.

In August, Chiles competed at the National Championships where she placed eleventh in the all-around and second on vault behind Simone Biles. She also placed tenth on uneven bars, fourteenth on balance beam, and twenty-first on floor exercise. She was not named to the senior national team. She received media recognition for competing in a Wonder Woman inspired leotard. In October, Chiles participated in the Worlds Team Selection Camp. During the competition, she placed third on vault behind Biles and Shilese Jones, seventh in the all-around and on balance beam, and sixth on uneven bars and floor exercise. While she did not make the world team, she was added to the 2018–2019 national team.

In November, Chiles signed her National Letter of Intent with UCLA, deferring until after the 2020 Olympics and initially planning to start in the 2020–2021 school year.

=== 2019–2020 ===
In June, it was revealed that Chiles had switched gyms, leaving Naydenov Gymnastics in her hometown of Vancouver, Washington and moving to Spring, Texas to train at World Champions Centre, the same gym at which Simone Biles trains.

Chiles was expected to compete at the American Classic. However, days before the competition, she withdrew. At the 2019 U.S. Classic in July, Chiles finished eleventh in the all-around with a score of 54.650. She also tied for eighth on the uneven bars with Leanne Wong, placed twelfth on the balance beam, and tied for sixteenth on the floor exercise with Sloane Blakely. At the 2019 U.S. National Championships in August, Chiles performed all eight of her routines without a fall to place sixth in the all-around. She also finished seventh on uneven bars, tied with Riley McCusker, placed twelfth on balance beam, and seventh on floor exercise. As a result, she was named to the national team.

In September, Chiles competed at the 2019 World team selection camp and placed eleventh with a score of 53.400 after falling on her Amanar vault and on floor exercise, and she was not named to the World Championships team. Chiles did not compete at all during the 2020 season due to the COVID-19 pandemic in the United States.

=== 2021 ===
In February, Chiles became the first ever women's all-around Winter Cup champion. She also finished first on vault and floor exercise, second on balance beam, and fourth on uneven bars. In May, Chiles placed second in the all-around at the U.S. Classic behind teammate Simone Biles. She also finished second on uneven bars, fourth on balance beam, and second on floor exercise. In June, Chiles placed third in the all-around at the U.S. National Gymnastics Championships behind Simone Biles and Sunisa Lee. She also finished third on vault. As a result she was named to the national team and selected to compete at the Olympic Trials.

At the Olympic Trials, Chiles finished third, once again behind Biles and Lee, and was named to the Olympic team alongside Biles, Lee, and Grace McCallum. Chiles was the only US team member to hit every routine she competed during the season leading up to the Olympics; out of 24 total routines, she did not fall once.

==== 2020 Tokyo Olympics ====
At the Olympic Games Chiles performed the all-around during qualifications. She finished 40th after struggles on multiple events: on uneven bars she brushed her feet on the ground during a transition between the bars, incurring a deduction equivalent to that of a fall; on balance beam she fell on her acrobatic series and put her hands down on her dismount. Her performance helped qualify the USA team to the team final in second place behind the Russian Olympic Committee.

During the team final Chiles was initially set to compete only on vault and floor exercise. However, Simone Biles withdrew from the competition after the first rotation and Chiles replaced her on uneven bars and balance beam. She hit both of those routines despite not having warmed up on either, but fell on her third pass on floor exercise. The United States won the silver medal, finishing second behind the Russian Olympic Committee.

=== 2022 ===
In August, Chiles competed at the National Championships. She finished third in the all-around behind Konnor McClain and Shilese Jones. In September Chiles competed at the Paris World Challenge Cup; she only competed on vault, uneven bars, and floor exercise. She qualified to all three event finals. During event finals she won gold on floor exercise, silver on vault behind teammate Jade Carey, and placed fifth on uneven bars.

In October, Chiles was selected to compete at the 2022 World Championships alongside Skye Blakely, Jade Carey, Shilese Jones, and Leanne Wong. During the qualification round Chiles helped the USA qualify to the team final in first place. Individually she qualified to the vault and floor exercise finals. Although she recorded the twelfth highest all-around score, she did not advance to the final due to teammates Jones and Carey scoring higher. During the team final Chiles contributed scores on all four apparatuses, helping the USA win their sixth consecutive team gold medal. On the first day of apparatus finals Chiles won silver on vault behind compatriot Carey. On the final day of competition she won silver on floor exercise behind Jessica Gadirova.

=== 2023 ===
In September, Chiles was named to the team to compete at the 2023 Pan American Games alongside Kayla DiCello, Kaliya Lincoln, Zoe Miller, and Tiana Sumanasekera. While there she helped the USA win team gold ahead of Brazil. Individually Chiles won bronze in the all-around behind DiCello and Flávia Saraiva and silver on vault behind Rebeca Andrade.

=== 2024 ===
Chiles began the season competing at the Core Hydration Classic, where she placed third in the all-around behind Simone Biles and Shilese Jones. At the National Championships Chiles placed fifth in the all-around and second on uneven bars behind Biles. As a result, she qualified to the upcoming Olympic Trials. At the Olympic trials, Chiles finished third in the all-around, as well on uneven bars and floor exercise, and second on vault. She was selected to represent the United States at the 2024 Summer Olympics alongside Biles, Jade Carey, Sunisa Lee, and Hezly Rivera.

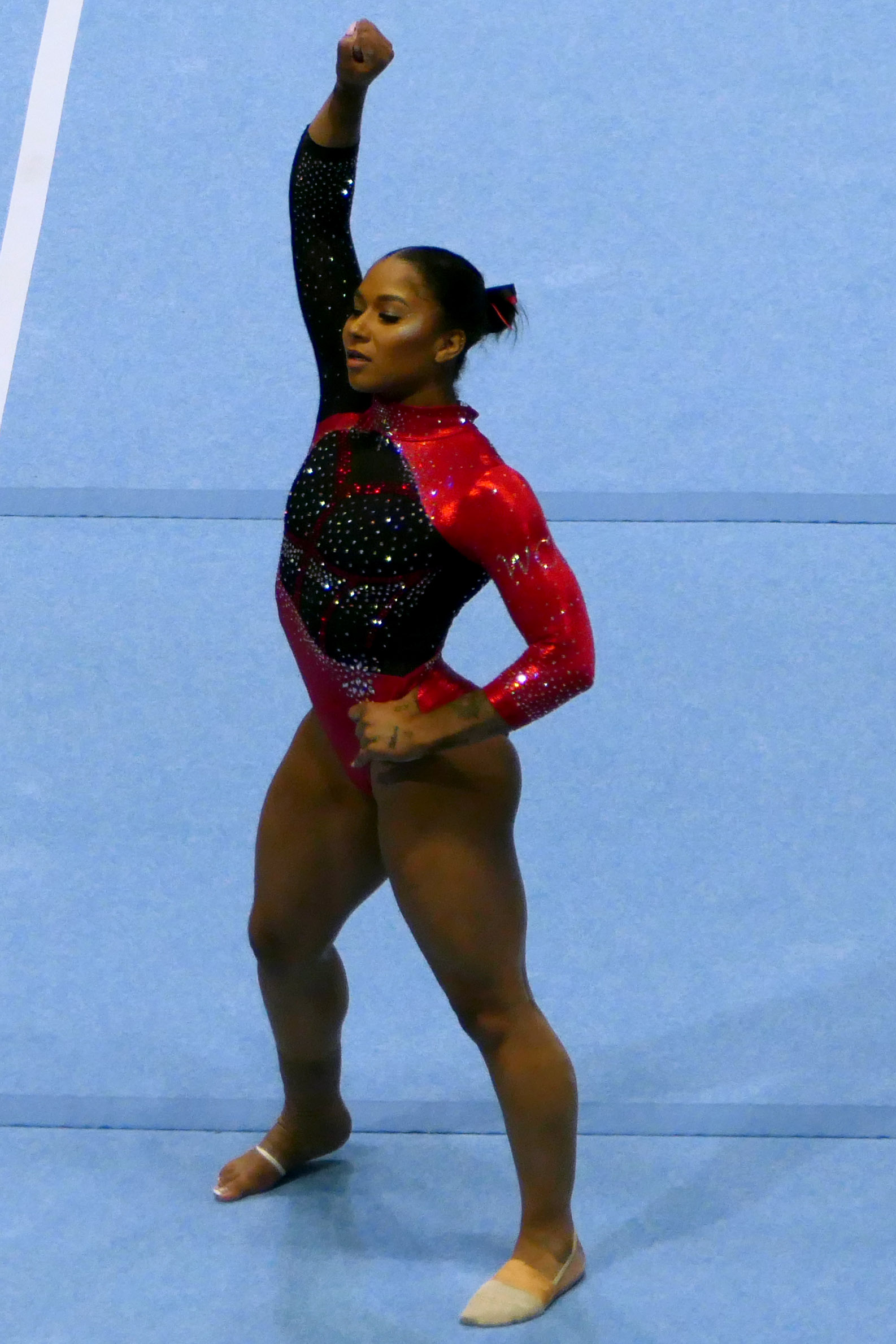
U.S. Classic

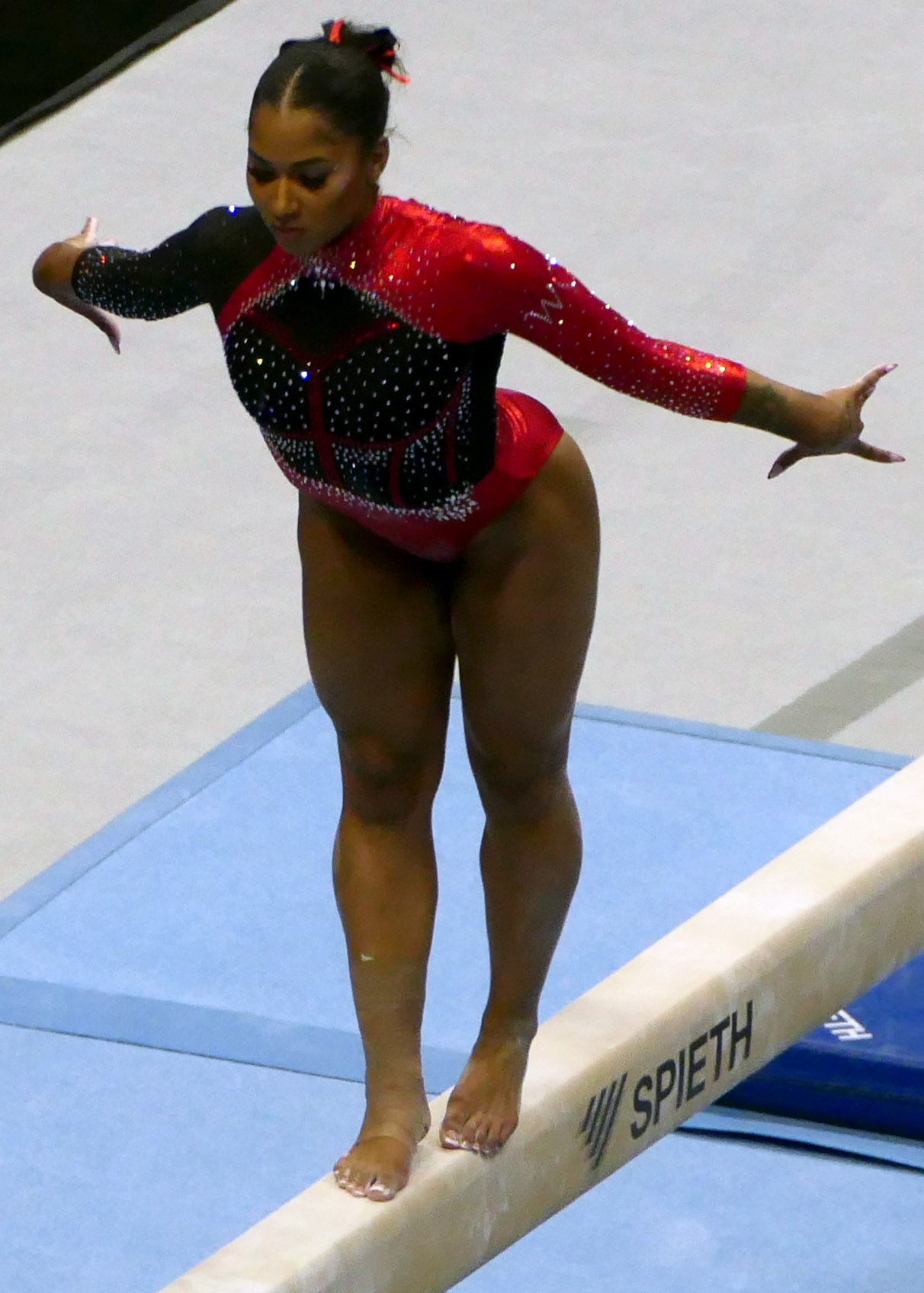
U.S. Classic

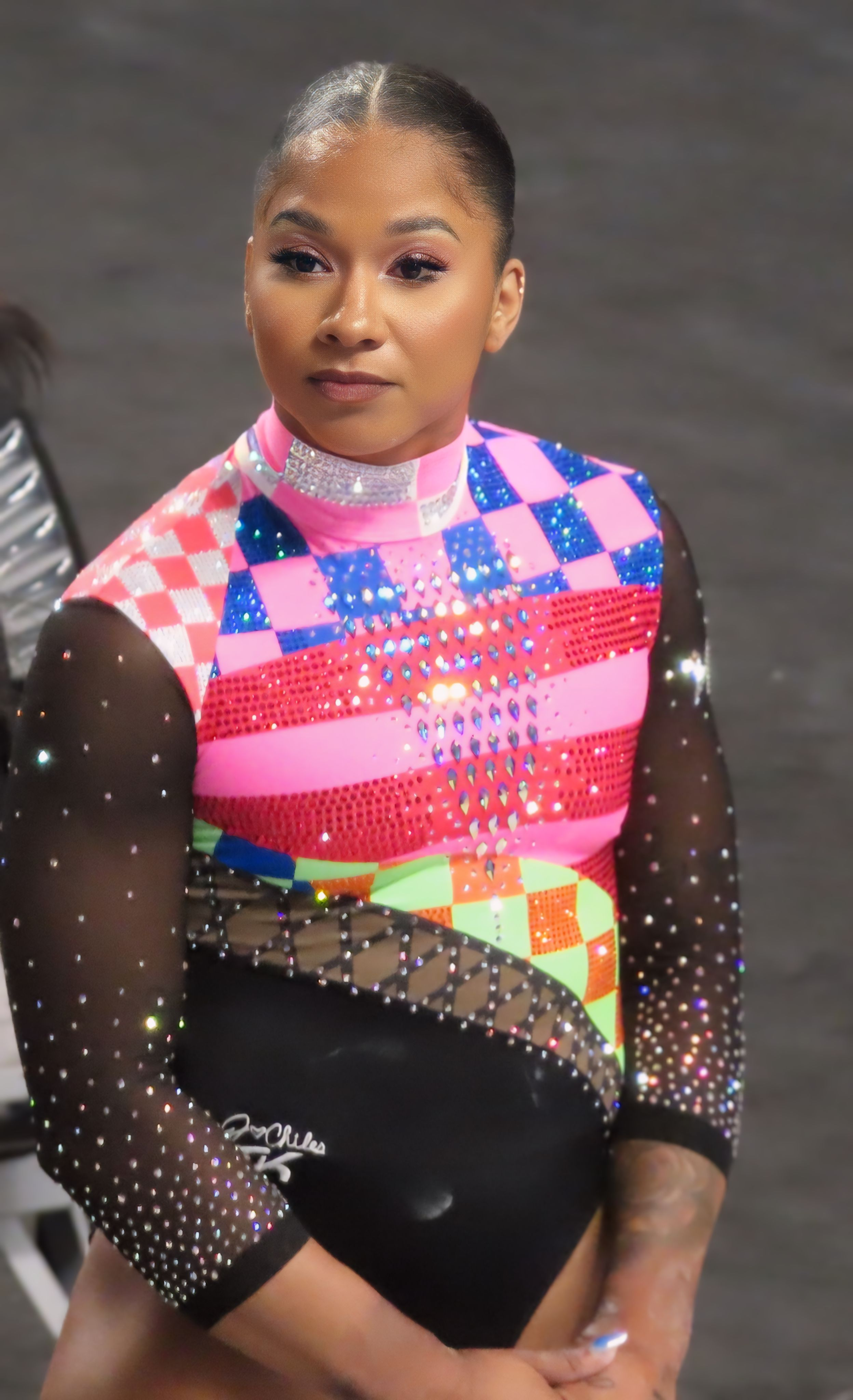
National Championships

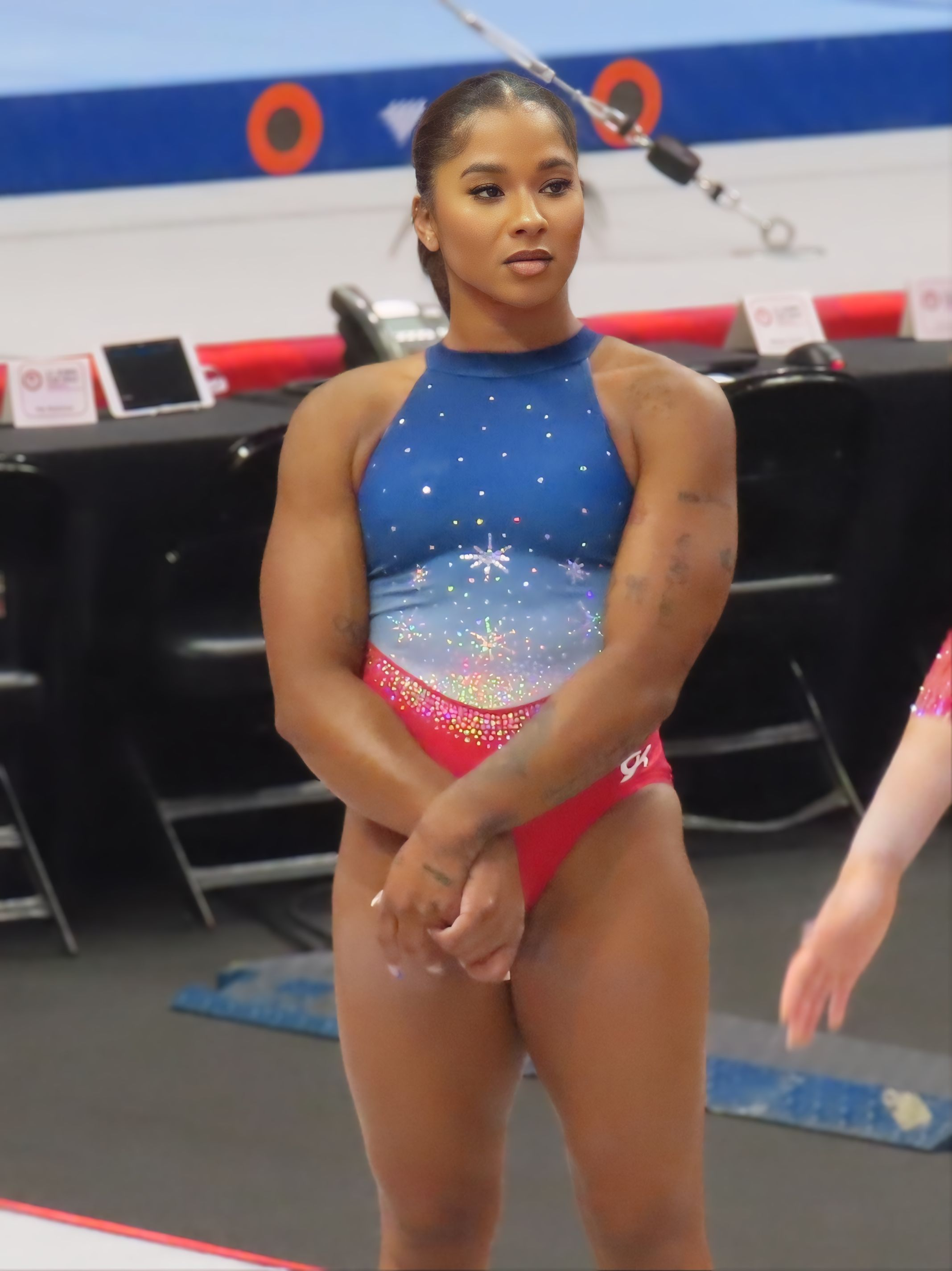
Olympic Trials

Chiles competing domestically throughout 2024

==== 2024 Paris Olympics ====
During the qualification round at the Olympics, Chiles competed on all four apparatuses. She ended the day ranked fourth overall; however, she did not advance to the all-around final due to the limit of two athletes max from the same nation competing in the finals; Biles and Lee placed higher. Additionally, she placed fourth on vault but again did not qualify to the final due to Biles and Carey placing higher. Chiles did manage to qualify to the floor exercise final in third.

During the team final, Chiles contributed scores on all four apparatuses towards the team's first place finish, earning the U.S. their fourth overall Olympic team gold medal.

Chiles went on to compete in the floor exercise final. Although Chiles' initial score was not high enough to earn a medal, Chiles's coach, Cécile Canqueteau-Landi, submitted an inquiry on Chiles' D-score. The inquiry was accepted and Chiles' score was raised by a tenth. Her revised score was the third highest of the event final, earning the bronze medal.

The Romanian Gymnastics Federation appealed this decision to the Court of Arbitration for Sport (CAS), on the basis that the inquiry was submitted past the one minute deadline and therefore should not have been accepted. The CAS ruled that Chiles' coach had made the inquiry at one minute and four seconds, which was four seconds over the allowed time. In response to the ruling, the International Gymnastics Federation (FIG) reinstated Chiles' initial score, which put her in fifth place, and reinstated Romanian gymnast Ana Bărbosu to third place while moving Sabrina Voinea to fourth.

On August 11, the International Olympic Committee upheld the findings of the CAS and announced that the bronze medal in the floor exercise would be reallocated to Bărbosu, thus leaving Chiles without an individual Olympic medal. USA Gymnastics appealed the ruling later that day, saying they had video evidence that Chiles' coach had appealed her score at 47 seconds, within the one-minute deadline, and not four seconds late. On August 12, the CAS denied a request to reconsider its ruling. Chiles appealed the decision to the Federal Supreme Court of Switzerland. On January 29, 2026, the court partially overturned the CAS ruling. The court found that new audio-visual evidence could show that the U.S. coach's scoring inquiry was submitted within the required one-minute time limit, and returned the case to CAS for reconsideration.

== Collegiate gymnastics career ==
=== 2021–22 season ===
During the fall of 2021 Chiles joined Simone Biles' Gold Over America Tour alongside Bruin alum Katelyn Ohashi. She joined the Bruins gymnastics team in December. Chiles made her NCAA debut on January 17, 2022, in a meet against Iowa and Minnesota. She only competed on the uneven bars and vault. On February 4, in a meet against Utah, Chiles earned her first collegiate perfect ten on floor exercise. She also won the all-around with a score of 39.700. As a result Chiles was named Pac-12 freshman of the week.

=== Career perfect 10.0 ===
Jordan Chiles' Perfect 10 Scores
Season	Date	Event	Meet
2022	February 4, 2022	Floor exercise	UCLA vs Utah
2022	February 12, 2022	Uneven bars	UCLA @ Stanford
2022	March 6, 2022	Floor exercise	UCLA vs Cal
2023	February 11, 2023	Floor exercise	UCLA vs Arizona State
2023	March 5, 2023	Uneven bars	UCLA vs Stanford
2023	March 11, 2023	Uneven bars	UCLA vs Iowa State
2023	April 1, 2023	Floor exercise	NCAA Regional Final
2023	April 13, 2023	Uneven bars	NCAA Championship Semifinal
2025	January 18, 2025	Uneven bars	UCLA @ Maryland
2025	February 1, 2025	Floor exercise	UCLA vs Michigan State
2025	March 22, 2025	Floor exercise	Big Ten Championships
2026	January 17, 2026	Vault	UCLA vs Nebraska
2026	January 25, 2026	Floor exercise	UCLA @ Michigan State
2026	January 30, 2026	Floor exercise	UCLA vs Washington
2026	February 7, 2026	Floor exercise	UCLA @ Minnesota
2026	February 14, 2026	Floor exercise	UCLA vs Michigan
2026	March 7, 2026	Uneven bars	UCLA @ Stanford
2026	March 21, 2026	Floor Exercise	Big Ten Championships
2026	April 5, 2026	Floor Exercise	NCAA Regional Final

=== Regular season ranking ===
Season	All-around	Vault	Uneven bars	Balance beam	Floor exercise
2022	27th	34th	18th	240th	23rd
2023	2nd	3rd	1st	11th	4th
2025	11th	7th	7th	75th	1st
2026	2nd	3rd	4th	4th	1st

== In the media ==
Chiles was named one of Time's Women of the Year for 2025. She was featured in the 2025 edition of the Sports Illustrated Swimsuit Issue and was selected as one of four cover models alongside Lauren Chan, Salma Hayek, and fellow gymnast Livvy Dunne. Chiles and her family appeared on the September 11, 2025 episode of Celebrity Family Feud where they competed against fellow 2024 Olympian Stephen Nedoroscik and his family. Nedoroscik's family ultimately won in the sudden death round. Chiles appeared on the cover of Teen Vogue in 2024, photographed by Erica Snyder.

=== Dancing with the Stars ===
In September 2025 it was announced that Chiles was joining the cast of the 34th season of Dancing with the Stars, partnering with Ezra Sosa. She placed third in the season finale. Chiles was the ninth Olympic gymnast to compete on the show, following Shawn Johnson, Nastia Liukin, Aly Raisman, Laurie Hernandez, Simone Biles, Mary Lou Retton, Sunisa Lee and Stephen Nedoroscik.

== Competitive history ==
Competitive history of Jordan Chiles at the junior elite level
Year	Event	Team	AA	VT	UB	BB	FX
2013	American Classic		3rd place, bronze medalist(s)	2nd place, silver medalist(s)	4	5	8
2013	U.S. National Championships		11	6	14	18	19
2014	City of Jesolo Trophy	1st place, gold medalist(s)	6	2nd place, silver medalist(s)			
2014	U.S. Classic		1st place, gold medalist(s)	1st place, gold medalist(s)	4	4	6
2014	U.S. National Championships		4	3rd place, bronze medalist(s)	21	10	3rd place, bronze medalist(s)
2015	U.S. Classic		8	6	3rd place, bronze medalist(s)		
2015	U.S. National Championships		4	1st place, gold medalist(s)	4	15	11
2016	International Gymnix	1st place, gold medalist(s)	7	1st place, gold medalist(s)			
2016	City of Jesolo Trophy		1st place, gold medalist(s)	1st place, gold medalist(s)	2nd place, silver medalist(s)	5	8
2016	U.S. Classic		4	1st place, gold medalist(s)	6		

Competitive history of Jordan Chiles at the senior elite level
Year	Event	Team	AA	VT	UB	BB	FX
2017	American Classic				4	5	
2017	U.S. Classic		6			5	
2017	U.S. National Championships		2nd place, silver medalist(s)		7	4	8
2018	Stuttgart World Cup		3rd place, bronze medalist(s)				
2018	Pacific Rim Championships	1st place, gold medalist(s)		1st place, gold medalist(s)		3rd place, bronze medalist(s)	1st place, gold medalist(s)
2018	U.S. Classic		8	2nd place, silver medalist(s)	8	17	6
2018	U.S. National Championships		11	2nd place, silver medalist(s)	10	14	21
2018	Worlds Team Selection Camp		7	3rd place, bronze medalist(s)	6	7	6
2019	U.S. Classic		11		8	12	16
2019	U.S. National Championships		6		7	12	7
2019	Worlds Team Selection Camp		11	12	4	11	9
2021	WOGA Classic		1st place, gold medalist(s)				
2021	Winter Cup		1st place, gold medalist(s)	1st place, gold medalist(s)	4	2nd place, silver medalist(s)	1st place, gold medalist(s)
2021	U.S. Classic		2nd place, silver medalist(s)		2nd place, silver medalist(s)	4	2nd place, silver medalist(s)
2021	U.S. National Championships		3rd place, bronze medalist(s)	3rd place, bronze medalist(s)	4	4	4
2021	Olympic Trials		3rd place, bronze medalist(s)		2nd place, silver medalist(s)	4	3rd place, bronze medalist(s)
2021	Olympic Games	2nd place, silver medalist(s)					
2022	U.S. National Championships		3rd place, bronze medalist(s)		3rd place, bronze medalist(s)	4	3rd place, bronze medalist(s)
2022	Paris Challenge Cup			2nd place, silver medalist(s)	5		1st place, gold medalist(s)
2022	World Championships	1st place, gold medalist(s)		2nd place, silver medalist(s)			2nd place, silver medalist(s)
2023	U.S. Classic				4	13	
2023	U.S. National Championships		5		8	18	6
2023	Pan American Games	1st place, gold medalist(s)	3rd place, bronze medalist(s)	2nd place, silver medalist(s)	7		
2024	U.S. Classic		3rd place, bronze medalist(s)		3rd place, bronze medalist(s)	7	7
2024	U.S. National Championships		5	4	2nd place, silver medalist(s)	16	9
2024	Olympic Trials		3rd place, bronze medalist(s)	2nd place, silver medalist(s)	3rd place, bronze medalist(s)	11	3rd place, bronze medalist(s)
2024	Olympic Games	1st place, gold medalist(s)					5

Competitive history of Jordan Chiles at the NCAA level
Year	Event	Team	AA	VT	UB	BB	FX
2022'	PAC-12 Championships	4	7	12	11	21	10
2022'	NCAA Championship				52		
2023	PAC-12 Championships	2nd place, silver medalist(s)	13		1st place, gold medalist(s)		1st place, gold medalist(s)
2023	NCAA Championship	5	2nd place, silver medalist(s)	5	1st place, gold medalist(s)	41	1st place, gold medalist(s)
2025	Big Ten Championships	1st place, gold medalist(s)	3rd place, bronze medalist(s)	17	7	6	1st place, gold medalist(s)
2025	NCAA Championships	2nd place, silver medalist(s)	5	8	1st place, gold medalist(s)	33	15
2026	Big Ten Championship	1st place, gold medalist(s)	1st place, gold medalist(s)	2nd place, silver medalist(s)	1st place, gold medalist(s)	1st place, gold medalist(s)	1st place, gold medalist(s)
2026	NCAA Championships	5	17	13	56	2nd place, silver medalist(s)	1st place, gold medalist(s)

== Filmography ==
Year	Title	Role	Notes
2023	Bunk'd	Herself	Episode: "Coop D'etat"
2024	The Tiny Chef Show	Herself	Episode: "Donuts"
2025	Dancing with the Stars	Contestant	Season 34
