= Susan Kunze =

American educator and author

Susan M. Kunze
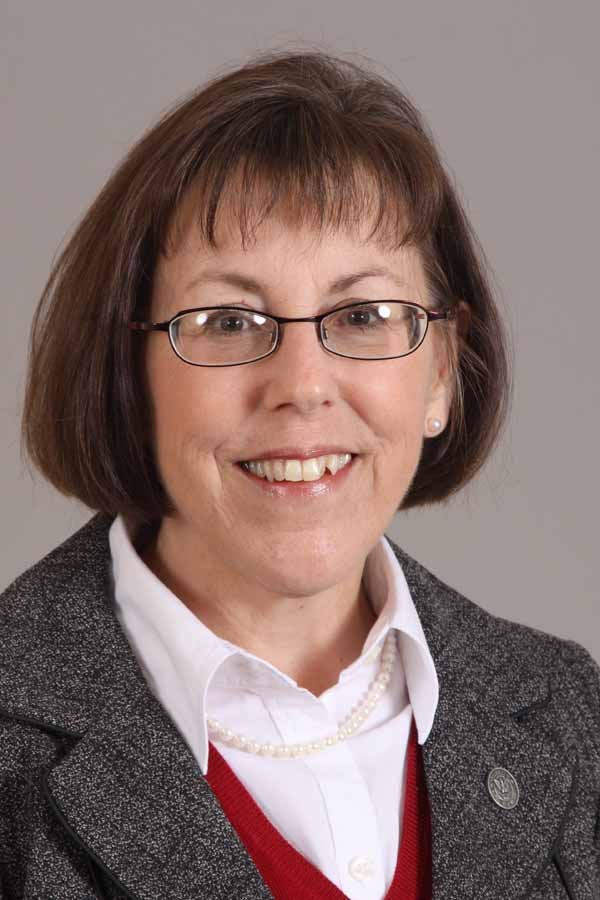
- Susan M. Kunze
- Born: June 6, 1953; Highland Park, CA
- Occupations: Educator, Author
- Spouse: Donald Kunze
- Children: two
- Parent(s): Harry Earl and Hazel Marie Andrews

Susan Marie Kunze (born June 6, 1953, in Highland Park, California) is a former second grade teacher in Bishop, California, situated in the foothills of the Sierra Nevada. She is an author of educational books and other resources, as well as a recipient of the 2008 Presidential Award for Excellence in Mathematics and Science Teaching.

== Education ==
Kunze graduated from Point Loma Nazarene University in 1975, earning a Bachelor of Arts degree and a Ryan Act Multiple Subject Credential. In 1982, she completed a Master of Education degree in Elementary Education (Curriculum Development and Instructional Methodologies) at the University of Nevada, Las Vegas.

== Career ==
She began her career in 1977, working as a teacher at Trinity Christian School in Las Vegas, Nevada. She spent much of her teaching career at Bishop Elementary School (Bishop Unified School District) in Inyo County where she worked as an elementary teacher from 1985 until her retirement in 2016.

In 2001, Kunze coauthored the book, "Ten-Minute Activities Grades 1-3" for Evan-Moor Publications. In 2002 she wrote "Grammar and Punctuation, Grade 2". She has authored "Play and Learn Math: Hundred Chart", published by Scholastic Corporation in 2018.

Kunze has been active in STEM education projects at the local, state, and federal levels. She has made presentations on elementary mathematics topics at various conferences, including California Mathematics Council, National Council of Teachers of Mathematics, and California Association of Bilingual Educators. Kunze has been a member of the NCTM Illuminations Writing Group, the LearnZillion Dream Team, a CommonSense Educator, and the State Network of Educators for the Smarter Balanced Digital Library. She was a member of the California State Mathematics Framework and Evaluation Criteria Committee, which authored the California Common Core Mathematics Framework in 2013. She is a member of the Teacher Advisory Council for the California Council on Science and Technology.

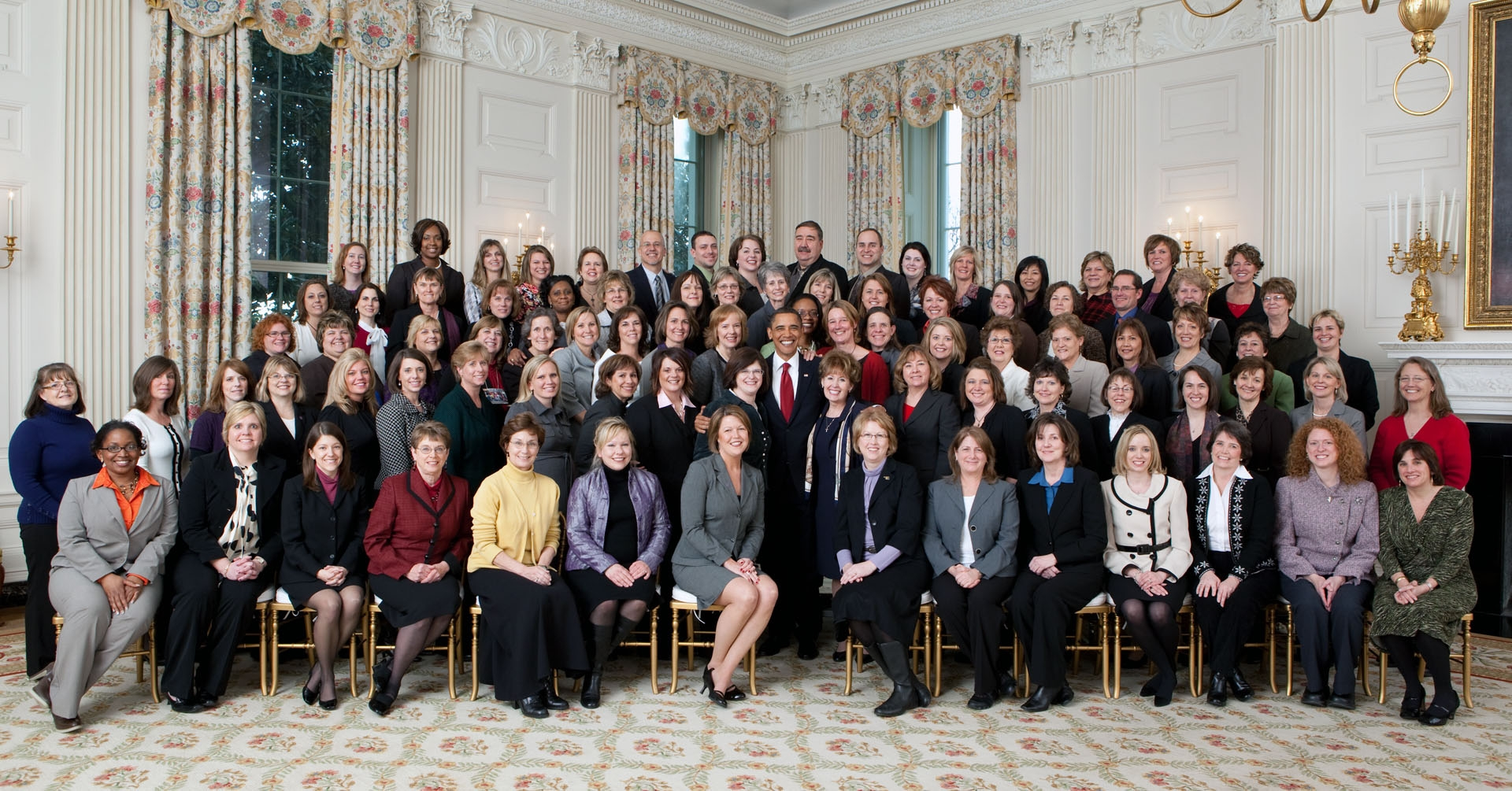
Susan Kunze with President Barack Obama and 2008 PAEMST Winners

In 2008, she was awarded the Presidential Award for Excellence in Mathematics and Science Teaching. She was flown to Washington, DC. and was in attendance for President Barack Obama's "Educate to Innovate" speech in 2010.

== Personal life ==
She is married to Donald L. Kunze (born 1954) of Van Nuys, California. She is the mother of two sons.
