= Scott Keeney =

American entrepreneur

- Born: 1964 (age 61–62); Seattle, Washington
- Education: MBA, Harvard University
- Alma mater: University of Washington
- Occupation: CEO
- Awards: Ernst & Young Entrepreneur of the Year, 2006

Scott Keeney (born 1964) is an American entrepreneur living in Vancouver, Washington.

== Business career ==
Scott Keeney is the founder of nLIGHT (2000) which manufactures high-power solid-state lasers. Before founding nLIGHT, he had been CEO of Aculight which was sold to Lockheed. Previously Keeney had been a consultant at McKinsey & Company in San Francisco and Seattle. Keeney began his career in manufacturing and quality management working with at Pacific Coast Feather Company. In 2007 Keeney was awarded the Outstanding Achievement Award from The Oregon Entrepreneurs Network and in 2006 Keeney was a winner of the Ernst & Young Entrepreneur Of The Year® Pacific Northwest Award.

== Education leadership ==
Keeney is founder and chair for nConnect, an education non-profit focused on enhancing rigorous high school science and math programs. In 2008, Keeney led an effort to expand nConnect and won a $13M grant from the National Math and Science Initiative. This grant was later rescinded due to a conflict between grant requirements and the collective bargaining laws in the state of Washington.
