= ZoomInfo =

U.S. data broker company

ZoomInfo Technologies Inc.
- Formerly: DiscoverOrg
- Type: Public
- Traded as: Nasdaq: GTM; S&P 600 component; Nasdaq: ZI (2020–2025)
- Industry: Data broker
- Founded: 2007; 19 years ago
- Founders: Henry Schuck; Kirk Brown
- Headquarters: Vancouver, Washington, U.S.
- Key people: Henry Schuck (CEO); Graham O’Brien (CFO); Andrew Riesenfeld (COO)
- Revenue: ▲US$1.25 billion (2025)
- Net income: ▲US$124 million (2025)
- Number of employees: 3,508 (2024)
- Subsidiaries: Rainking; NeverBounce; Datanyze; Komiko; Clickagy; EverString Technology; Insent; Chorus.ai; RingLead
- Website: www.zoominfo.com/about

ZoomInfo Technologies Inc. is a registered data broker in the United States. The company collects and sells personal data, both public and private, through various means of data and web scraping. Information about business entities like companies and departments are also collected and offered. This personal information is available for sale to other businesses, which use the collected data for targeted marketing.

The company is the subject of numerous complaints and multiple lawsuits concerning its collection and sales of personal data.

== History ==
In 2007, DiscoverOrg was founded by Henry Schuck and Kirk Brown. In February 2019, it acquired its competitor, Zoom Information, Inc. and rebranded as ZoomInfo. DiscoverOrg's CEO Henry Schuck, CFO Cameron Hyzer, and Chief Revenue Officer Chris Hays kept their roles. Zoom Information was established in 2000 as Eliyon Technologies by founders Yonatan Stern and Michel Decary, and in August 2017 was acquired by Great Hill Partners, a private equity firm, for $240 million.

ZoomInfo has traded on the Nasdaq stock exchange since 2020. The company changed its ticker symbol from “ZI” to "GTM" in May 2025.

The company was accused of investors fraud in a 2024 lawsuit, and breach of fiduciary duties to its shareholders in 2026; the former lawsuit reached a proposed settlement of $44 million in October 2026.

=== Acquisitions ===
In 2017, as DiscoverOrg, the company acquired RainKing and in 2018, NeverBounce and Datanyze. In 2019, ZoomInfo acquired Komiko and in 2020, Clickagy and EverString Technology. In 2021, ZoomInfo acquired Insent, Chorus.ai, and RingLead. In 2026, ZoomInfo acquired DoubleO.ai.

== Lawsuits ==
Zoominfo is subject to multiple lawsuits for illegally collecting and selling personal data without consent, misleading investors and artificially inflating its stock price. Zoominfo is accused of "omitting truthful information about the company’s customer base, its subscription renewal practices, and other issues from SEC filings and related material" in the latter lawsuit; in October 2026, ZoomInfo proposed a $44 million settlement.
