= Bill Zender =

- Born: April 2, 1955 (age 71); Chicago, Illinois
- Other name: William Allen Zender
- Education: University of Nevada, Las Vegas
- Occupations: Gaming consultant, speaker, author
- Website: billzender.com

Bill Zender (born 2 April 1955) is an American author, business executive, consultant, and speaker. He is the founder of Bill Zender and Associates.

== Biography ==
Bill Zender is a published casino gaming consultant who specializes in table game protection, management training, table game performance evaluations, and court expert witness testimony. Over the past several years Zender has worked for a number of major casino corporations in North America. He has published several books on casino gaming including Card Counting for the Casino Manager (1990), and his Casino-ology Series (2009 & 2011). Zender presently writes articles for the Casino Enterprise Management magazine.

Bill Zender received a bachelor's degree in Hotel Administration from the University of Nevada, Las Vegas in 1976. In 1979, Zender completed Peace Officer training at the Nevada P.O.S.T as a requirement of his position with the Nevada Gaming Control Board. Zender returned to school in 2001, and earned Masters in Business Administration through the University of Phoenix.

From 1979 through 1981, Bill Zender spent time with the Nevada Gaming Control Board as an agent in the Enforcement Division. Based on His law enforcement experience, Zender has spent a reasonable amount of time in court testifying in civil and criminal trials involving casino gaming.

Bill Zender entered the gaming industry in 1976 as a blackjack dealer at the now defunct Royal Inn Casino. He continued on through the gaming industry to hold a number of executive positions including:

- Asian Games Manager, Desert Inn Hotel/Casino, Las Vegas Nevada
- Pai Gow Tiles Manager, Artichoke Joe's Casino, San Bruno California
- Casino Manager, Maxim Hotel/Casino, Las Vegas Nevada
- Vice President and Licensee, Aladdin Hotel/Casino, Las Vegas Nevada
- General Manager. Casino San Pablo, San Pablo California

Bill Zender was one of the original owners of PCI Dealing School in Las Vegas, taught course on gaming and gaming management at the Clark County Community College (presently the College of Southern Nevada), and participated for a number of years as a professional gambler. Presently Zender has his own gaming consulting business, Bill Zender and Associates LLC, and is considered one of the leaders in his field. In 2015, Zender was appointed to the Galaxy Gaming board of directors as director; he stepped down in April 2022

== Books ==
- Zender, Bill (1989). Pai Gow without Tears. Las Vegas: Self Published.
- Zender, Bill (1990). Card Counting for the Casino Executive. Las Vegas: Self Published.
- Zender, Bill (1991). Pai Gow Poker: Understanding Strategies and Procedures. Las Vegas: Self Published.
- Zender, Bill (1998). How to Detect Casino Cheating at Blackjack. Oakland: RGE Publishing. ISBN 0-910575-09-6.
- Zender, Bill (2006). Advantage Play for the Casino Executive. Las Vegas: Self Published.
- Zender, Bill (2009). Casino-ology: The Art of Managing Casino Games. Las Vegas: Huntington Press. ISBN 978-0-929712-27-7.
- Zender, Bill (2011). Casino-ology 2: New Strategies for Managing Casino Games. Las Vegas: Huntington Press. ISBN 978-1-935396-43-7.
