= 2022 SEC Gymnastics Championship =

2022 SEC Gymnastics Championships
- Venue: Legacy Arena
- Location: Birmingham, Alabama
- Dates: March 19
- Competitors: Florida; LSU; Auburn; Alabama; Kentucky; Missouri; Arkansas; Georgia
- Teams: 8
- Winning score: 198.200

Medalists
gold medal	Florida
silver medal	Alabama
bronze medal	Auburn

The 2022 SEC Gymnastics Championship was held on March 19, 2022 at the neutral site of Legacy Arena in Birmingham, Alabama. All eight teams competed, with Florida posting a score of 198.200 to win the meet.

== Team results ==
The top four nationally seeded teams were placed into the night session (II), and the bottom four seeded teams were placed into the day session (I). Florida won the 2022 regular season championship, and then the SEC Championship outright after their second place finish at the 2021 championship.

Session I (March 19, 3:30 pm ET)
Seed	Team	Vault	Uneven bars	Balance beam	Floor	Totals
9	Kentucky	49.050	49.050	48.875	49.375	196.350
11	Missouri	49.150	49.150	49.250	49.325	196.875
17	Arkansas	49.250	49.150	48.825	49.225	196.450
22	Georgia	49.025	49.100	48.425	49.250	195.800

Session II (March 19, 8:00 pm ET)
Seed	Team	Vault	Uneven bars	Balance beam	Floor	Totals
2	Florida	49.475	49.475	49.700	49.550	198.200
5	LSU	49.275	48.575	49.550	49.325	196.725
6	Auburn	49.225	49.675	48.900	49.425	197.225
6	Alabama	49.350	49.675	49.375	49.425	197.825

=== Final results ===
Rank	Team	Vault	Uneven bars	Balance beam	Floor	Totals
1st place, gold medalist(s)	Florida	49.475	49.475	49.700	49.550	198.200
2nd place, silver medalist(s)	Alabama	49.350	49.675	49.375	49.425	197.825
3rd place, bronze medalist(s)	Auburn	49.225	49.675	48.900	49.425	197.225
4	Missouri	49.150	49.150	49.250	49.325	196.875
5	LSU	49.275	48.575	49.550	49.325	196.725
6	Arkansas	49.250	49.150	48.825	49.225	196.450
7	Kentucky	49.050	49.050	48.875	49.375	196.350
8	Georgia	49.025	49.100	48.425	49.250	195.800

== Individual results ==
=== Medalists ===
Event	Gold	Silver	Bronze
Individual all-around	Trinity Thomas (Florida)	Leanne Wong (Florida)	Megan Skaggs (Florida)
Vault	Trinity Thomas (Florida)	Nya Reed (Florida) Jocelyn Moore (Missouri)	N/A
Uneven bars	Sunisa Lee (Auburn)	Luisa Blanco (Alabama) Makarri Doggette (Alabama) Shania Adams (Alabama) Aria Brusch (Auburn) Derrian Gobourne (Auburn) Trinity Thomas (Florida)	N/A
Balance beam	Leanne Wong (Florida)	Sophia Groth (Auburn) Alyssa Baumann (Florida Megan Skaggs (Florida) Haleigh Bryant (LSU) Sienna Schreiber (Missouri)	N/A
Floor	Trinity Thomas (Florida)	Derrian Gobourne (Auburn) Sunisa Lee (Auburn) Raena Worley (Kentucky)	N/A

=== All-Around ===
Rank	Gymnast	Team	Vault (gymnastics)	Uneven bars	Balance beam	Floor (gymnastics)	Total
1st place, gold medalist(s)	Trinity Thomas	Florida	9.975	9.9500	9.9250	9.9750	39.825
2nd place, silver medalist(s)	Leanne Wong	Florida	9.8500	9.9000	9.9750	9.9250	39.650
2nd place, silver medalist(s)	Megan Skaggs	Florida	9.8500	9.9500	9.9500	9.9000	39.650
4	Lily Hudson	Alabama	9.9000	9.9000	9.8750	9.8500	39.525
5	Cassie Stevens	Auburn	9.8750	9.9000	9.8250	9.8750	39.475
6	Raena Worley	Kentucky	9.8000	9.9000	9.8000	9.9500	39.450
6	Sienna Schreiber	Missouri	9.8250	9.8500	9.9500	9.8250	39.450
8	Sophia Groth	Auburn	9.7500	9.8750	9.9500	9.7750	39.350
9	Kennedy Hambrick	Arkansas	9.8250	9.8500	9.8000	9.8000	39.275
9	Sunisa Lee	Auburn	9.8750	10.0000	9.4500	9.9500	39.275
11	Sloane Blakely	Florida	9.7250	9.8250	9.9000	9.7000	39.150
12	Luisa Blanco	Alabama	9.8500	9.9500	9.3750	9.8750	39.050
13	Kiya Johnson	LSU	9.8750	9.2000	9.9000	9.9000	38.875
14	Leah Smith	Arkansas	9.8500	9.8250	9.5000	9.6500	38.825
15	Haleigh Bryant	LSU	9.0500	9.9250	9.9500	9.8500	38.775
16	Jillian Procasky	Kentucky	9.6000	9.7500	9.2500	9.7000	38.300
