= 2022 NCAA women's gymnastics tournament =

American college gymnastics competition

- Venue: Dickies Arena (semi-finals and final)
- Location: Fort Worth, Texas
- Teams: 36

Medalists
gold medal	Oklahoma
silver medal	Florida
bronze medal	Utah

The 2022 NCAA women's gymnastics tournament was the 39th annual NCAA women's gymnastics tournament, the women's gymnastics championship contested by the teams of the member institutions of the NCAA. The first three rounds were hosted on campuses from March 30 to April 2, 2022, and the semi-finals and final were held at Dickies Arena in Fort Worth, Texas from April 14 to April 16, 2022.

== Regional championships ==
The top two teams from each region advanced to the championship round, with their names indicated in bold. The regional final competitions were held on April 2. The eight lowest-seeded teams competed on March 30 in the First Round, followed by the Second Round on March 31.

- **Auburn, Alabama** – Auburn University, host (March 30-April 2)
  - Regional teams: **No. 7 Auburn** 197.775, No. 10 Kentucky 197.500, Georgia, Southern Utah (Session 1); **No. 2 Florida*** 198.775, No. 15 Denver 197.225, Ohio State, Iowa State, Western Michigan (Session 2)
- **Norman, Oklahoma** – University of Oklahoma, host (March 30-April 2)
  - Regional teams: **No. 8 Minnesota** 197.725, No. 9 California 197.300, Boise State, Utah State (Session 1); **No. 1 Oklahoma*** 198.250, No. 16 Arizona State, Arkansas 196.675, West Virginia, Arizona (Session 2)
- **Raleigh, North Carolina** – North Carolina State University, host (March 30-April 2)
  - Regional teams: No. 6 LSU, **No. 11 Missouri** 197.425, Iowa 197.075, North Carolina State (Session 1); **No. 3 Michigan*** 197.800, No. 14 UCLA 197.400, Maryland, Towson, North Carolina (Session 2)
- **Seattle, Washington** – University of Washington, host (March 30-April 2)
  - Regional teams: **No. 5 Alabama** 198.175, No. 12 Michigan State 197.650, BYU, Washington (Session 1); **No. 4 Utah*** 198.200, No. 13 Oregon State, Illinois, Stanford 197.250, San Jose State (Session 2)

* – Denotes regional champions

== Regional results ==
=== Norman Regional ===
First round

Seed	School	Vault	Bars	Beam	Floor	Overall
–	Arizona	48.725	49.200	49.275	49.325	196.525
–	West Virginia	48.650	48.925	49.000	49.350	195.925

Session 1 (Round 2)

Seed	School	Vault	Bars	Beam	Floor	Overall
8	Minnesota	49.525	49.400	49.350	49.550	197.825
9	California	48.950	49.500	49.400	49.525	197.375
–	Utah State	49.075	49.300	49.125	49.325	196.825
–	Boise State	48.900	49.225	49.150	49.150	196.425

Session 2 (Round 2)

Seed	School	Vault	Bars	Beam	Floor	Overall
1	Oklahoma	49.550	49.625	49.475	49.525	198.175
–	Arkansas	49.075	49.450	49.075	49.375	196.975
–	Arizona	48.925	49.250	49.125	49.500	196.800
16	Arizona State	48.800	49.150	49.150	49.500	196.600

Regional Final

Seed	School	Vault	Bars	Beam	Floor	Overall
1	Oklahoma	49.600	49.400	49.650	49.600	198.250
8	Minnesota	49.550	49.275	49.250	49.650	197.725
9	California	49.125	49.125	49.525	49.525	197.300
–	Arkansas	48.800	49.225	49.250	49.400	196.675

=== Seattle Regional ===
First round

Seed	School	Vault	Bars	Beam	Floor	Overall
–	Stanford	49.125	48.950	49.100	49.250	196.425
–	San Jose State	48.900	49.150	47.875	49.225	195.150

Session 1 (Round 2)

Seed	School	Vault	Bars	Beam	Floor	Overall
5	Alabama	49.400	49.550	49.450	49.500	197.900
12	Michigan State	49.200	49.225	49.350	49.550	197.325
–	Washington	49.350	49.300	49.275	49.250	197.175
–	BYU	49.075	49.075	49.250	49.225	196.625

Session 2 (Round 2)

Seed	School	Vault	Bars	Beam	Floor	Overall
4	Utah	49.325	49.475	49.700	49.300	197.800
–	Stanford	49.225	49.450	49.350	49.425	197.450
13	Oregon State	49.325	49.150	49.475	49.475	197.425
–	Illinois	49.300	49.400	49.375	49.300	197.375

Regional Final

Seed	School	Vault	Bars	Beam	Floor	Overall
4	Utah	49.400	49.475	49.725	49.600	198.200
5	Alabama	49.500	49.400	49.625	49.650	198.175
12	Michigan State	49.400	49.275	49.425	49.550	197.650
–	Stanford	49.300	49.225	49.275	49.450	197.250

=== Auburn Regional ===
First round

Seed	School	Vault	Bars	Beam	Floor	Overall
–	Iowa State	49.100	49.075	48.725	48.850	195.750
–	Western Michigan	48.975	47.450	48.650	48.500	193.575

Session 1 (Round 2)

Seed	School	Vault	Bars	Beam	Floor	Overall
10	Kentucky	49.400	49.525	49.300	49.525	197.750
7	Auburn	49.350	49.300	49.475	49.375	197.500
–	Southern Utah	48.975	49.200	49.025	49.125	196.325
–	Georgia	49.150	49.150	48.900	48.525	195.725

Session 2 (Round 2)

Seed	School	Vault	Bars	Beam	Floor	Overall
2	Florida	49.100	49.650	49.675	49.700	198.125
15	Denver	49.000	49.325	49.300	49.450	197.075
–	Ohio State	49.300	49.400	49.100	49.125	196.925
–	Iowa State	49.100	49.275	49.150	49.200	196.725

Regional Final

Seed	School	Vault	Bars	Beam	Floor	Overall
2	Florida	49.700	49.675	49.750	49.650	198.775
7	Auburn	49.450	49.200	49.625	49.500	197.775
10	Kentucky	49.375	49.250	49.300	49.575	197.500
15	Denver	49.175	49.350	49.325	49.375	197.225

=== Raleigh Regional ===
First round

Seed	School	Vault	Bars	Beam	Floor	Overall
–	North Carolina	48.950	48.700	49.275	48.800	195.725
–	Towson	48.950	48.900	48.275	49.125	195.250

Session 1 (Round 2)

Seed	School	Vault	Bars	Beam	Floor	Overall
11	Missouri	49.150	49.175	49.450	49.375	197.150
–	Iowa	49.225	49.125	49.275	49.275	196.900
6	LSU	49.475	49.000	48.600	49.500	196.575
–	North Carolina State	49.025	48.825	48.950	48.900	195.700

Session 2 (Round 2)

Seed	School	Vault	Bars	Beam	Floor	Overall
14	UCLA	49.400	49.475	49.300	49.625	197.800
3	Michigan	49.375	49.225	49.550	49.350	197.400
–	Maryland	49.175	48.775	49.150	48.925	196.025
–	North Carolina	49.075	48.700	48.325	49.050	195.150

Regional Final

Seed	School	Vault	Bars	Beam	Floor	Overall
3	Michigan	49.600	49.525	49.250	49.425	197.800
11	Missouri	49.125	49.375	49.350	49.575	197.425
14	UCLA	49.325	49.400	49.125	49.550	197.400
–	Iowa	49.350	49.225	49.075	49.425	197.075

== NCAA Championship ==
=== Semi-finals ===
The top two teams from each semifinal advanced to the National Championship, which were televised live on ABC on April 16 at 1:00 pm ET.

Florida gymnast Trinity Thomas was the only gymnast to score a 10.000 in any of the semi-finals or final. She scored two 10.000s, one on floor in the second semi-final, and the other on floor again in the final.

Semifinal I - April 14 at 1PM ET
Seed	School	Vault	Bars	Beam	Floor	Total
1	Oklahoma	49.350	49.575	49.5125	49.675	198.1125
4	Utah	49.425	49.2125	49.600	49.475	197.7125
8	Minnesota	49.500	49.3875	48.975	49.500	197.1125
5	Alabama	49.125	49.200	49.325	49.450	197.100

Semifinal II - April 14 at 6PM ET
Seed	School	Vault	Bars	Beam	Floor	Total
2	Florida	49.2375	49.475	49.5125	49.750	197.9750
7	Auburn	49.350	49.4375	49.475	49.575	197.8375
3	Michigan	49.425	48.675	48.700	49.4875	196.2875
11	Missouri	49.250	49.1125	49.425	49.4125	197.200

=== National Championship ===
Rank	Team	Vault (gymnastics)	Uneven bars	Balance beam	Floor (gymnastics)	Total
1st place, gold medalist(s)	Oklahoma	49.6625	49.7250	49.6250	49.1875	198.2000
1st place, gold medalist(s)	Katherine LeVasseur	9.9750	9.9375	9.9000		29.8125
1st place, gold medalist(s)	Olivia Trautman	9.9625	9.9000	9.9000		29.7625
1st place, gold medalist(s)	Danielle Sievers	9.8500	9.9750		9.8750	29.7000
1st place, gold medalist(s)	Jordan Bowers	9.9375	9.9500		9.6500	29.5375
1st place, gold medalist(s)	Ragan Smith		9.8250	9.9625	9.7375	29.5250
1st place, gold medalist(s)	Audrey Davis		9.9625	9.9375		19.9000
1st place, gold medalist(s)	Carly Woodard			9.9250	9.8500	19.7750
1st place, gold medalist(s)	Danae Fletcher	9.8875			9.8750	19.7625
1st place, gold medalist(s)	Allie Stern	9.9000				9.9000
1st place, gold medalist(s)	Jenna Dunn			9.8500		9.8500
1st place, gold medalist(s)	Bell Johnson				9.8500	9.8500
2nd place, silver medalist(s)	Florida	49.3500	49.5250	49.5000	49.7125	198.0875
2nd place, silver medalist(s)	Trinity Thomas	9.9875	9.9750	9.9000	10.0000	39.8625
2nd place, silver medalist(s)	Leanne Wong	9.9125	9.8750	9.8375	9.9500	39.5750
2nd place, silver medalist(s)	Megan Skaggs	9.8375	9.9125	9.9000	9.8750	39.5250
2nd place, silver medalist(s)	Alyssa Baumann			9.9125	9.9500	19.8625
2nd place, silver medalist(s)	Savannah Schoenherr	9.8000	9.9250			19.7250
2nd place, silver medalist(s)	Payton Richards	9.8125			9.9000	19.7125
2nd place, silver medalist(s)	Sloane Blakely		9.8375	9.8625		19.7000
2nd place, silver medalist(s)	Nya Reed	9.7000			9.9125	19.6125
2nd place, silver medalist(s)	Leah Clapper			9.9250		9.9250
2nd place, silver medalist(s)	Riley McCusker		9.4125			9.4125
3rd place, bronze medalist(s)	Utah	49.2250	49.5500	49.5125	49.4625	197.7500
3rd place, bronze medalist(s)	Grace McCallum	9.8375	9.9500	9.8750	9.9000	39.5625
3rd place, bronze medalist(s)	Maile O'Keefe	9.8125	9.9000	9.9000	8.7000	38.3125
3rd place, bronze medalist(s)	Abby Paulson		9.8000	9.9000	9.9000	29.6000
3rd place, bronze medalist(s)	Jaedyn Rucker	9.9750			9.8875	19.8625
3rd place, bronze medalist(s)	Amelie Morgan		9.9000	9.8875		19.7875
3rd place, bronze medalist(s)	Cristal Isa		9.8875	9.8375		19.7250
3rd place, bronze medalist(s)	Kara Eaker			9.9500		9.9500
3rd place, bronze medalist(s)	Sage Thompson		9.9125			9.9125
3rd place, bronze medalist(s)	Sydney Soloski				9.9125	9.9125
3rd place, bronze medalist(s)	Jaylene Gilstrap				9.8625	9.8625
3rd place, bronze medalist(s)	Alexia Burch	9.8375				9.8375
3rd place, bronze medalist(s)	Lucy Stanhope	9.7625				9.7625
3rd place, bronze medalist(s)	Cammy Hall	9.2500				9.2500
4	Auburn	49.3375	49.4250	49.2000	49.3875	197.3500
4	Sunisa Lee	9.8625	9.9125	9.9000	9.9500	39.6250
4	Cassie Stevens	9.9375	9.8500	9.8375	9.8250	39.4500
4	Sophia Groth	9.7875	9.8875	9.8000	9.8625	39.3375
4	Derrian Gobourne	9.8875	9.9375		9.9375	29.7625
4	Aria Brusch		9.8375	9.7875	9.8000	29.4250
4	Drew Watson	9.7750			9.8125	19.5875
4	Sara Hubbard	9.8625				9.8625
4	Olivia Hollingsworth			9.8375		9.8375
4	Gabby McLaughlin			9.8250		9.8250
4	Adeline Sabados		9.8250			9.8250

== Individual results ==
=== Medalists ===
Event	Gold	Silver	Bronze
Individual all-around	Trinity Thomas (Florida)	Sunisa Lee (Auburn)	Megan Skaggs (Florida)
Vault	Jaedyn Rucker (Utah)	Amari Celestine (Missouri)	Allie Stern (Oklahoma)
Uneven bars	Trinity Thomas (Florida)	Sierra Brooks (Michigan) Jade Carey (Oregon State) Audrey Davis (Oklahoma) Derrian Gobourne (Auburn) Lexy Ramler (Minnesota)	—N/a
Balance beam	Sunisa Lee (Auburn)	Adeline Kenlin (Iowa) Sienna Schreiber (Missouri)	—N/a
Floor	Trinity Thomas (Florida)	Jordan Bowers (Oklahoma) Derrian Gobourne (Auburn)	—N/a

=== All-around ===
Rank	Gymnast	Vault (gymnastics)	Uneven bars	Balance beam	Floor (gymnastics)	Total
1st place, gold medalist(s)	Trinity Thomas (Florida)	9.9000	9.9750	9.9375	10.0000	39.8125
2nd place, silver medalist(s)	Sunisa Lee (Auburn)	9.8500	9.9125	9.9625	9.9500	39.6750
3rd place, bronze medalist(s)	Megan Skaggs (Florida)	9.9000	9.9125	9.9125	9.9375	39.6625
4	Jade Carey (Oregon State)	9.8875	9.9500	9.9000	9.9125	39.6500
5	Leanne Wong (Florida)	9.9000	9.9125	9.8625	9.9500	39.6250
6	Lexy Ramler (Minnesota)	9.8375	9.9500	9.9375	9.8875	39.6125
7	Norah Flatley (UCLA)	9.8875	9.8875	9.9375	9.8875	39.6000
8	Natalie Wojcik (Michigan)	9.8875	9.9250	9.8625	9.9125	39.5875
9	Abby Heiskell (Michigan)	9.8625	9.9125	9.9000	9.9000	39.5750
10	Maile O'Keefe (Utah)	9.8250	9.9000	9.9375	9.8875	39.5500
11	Sienna Schreiber (Missouri)	9.8375	9.8250	9.9500	9.8875	39.5000
12	Raena Worley (Kentucky)	9.8250	9.8750	9.8750	9.9125	39.4875
13	Sophia Groth (Auburn)	9.8000	9.8375	9.9250	9.9000	39.4625
14	Grace McCallum (Utah)	9.8625	9.7250	9.8875	9.9375	39.4125
15	Cassie Stevens (Auburn)	9.7875	9.8500	9.8375	9.9000	39.3750
16	Ona Loper (Minnesota)	9.8375	9.9000	9.7250	9.8875	39.3500
17	Kennedy Hambrick (Arkansas)	9.8625	9.8625	9.8875	9.7125	39.3250
18	Sierra Brooks (Michigan)	9.9000	9.9500	9.2875	9.9000	39.0375
19	Lilly Hudson (Alabama)	9.7000	9.7875	9.6000	9.9125	39.0000
20	Naomi Morrison (Michigan)	9.7875	9.8875	9.0750	9.7750	38.5250
