= Megan Skaggs =

American artistic gymnast

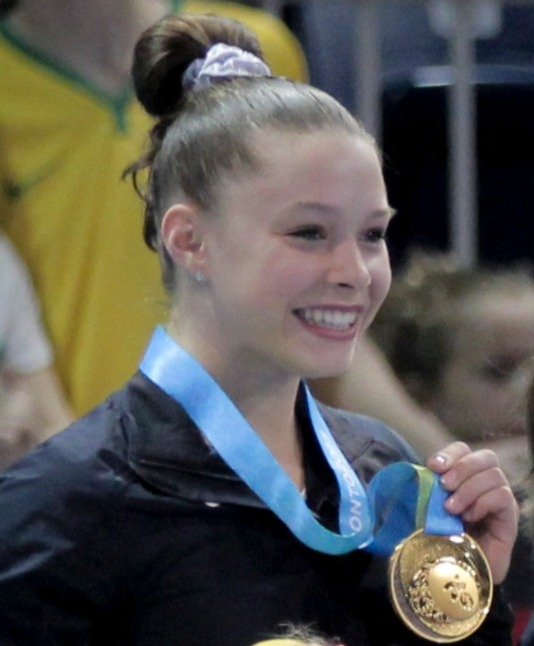
- Skaggs at the 2015 Pan American Games

Personal information
- Full name: Megan Stephanie Skaggs
- Born: May 7, 1999 (age 27) Atlanta, Georgia, U.S.
- Height: 5 ft 3 in (160 cm)

Gymnastics career
- Discipline: Women's artistic gymnastics
- Country represented: United States
- College team: Florida Gators (2018–2021)
- Gym: Gymnastics Academy of Atlanta
- Head coach: Jenny Rowland
- Assistant coaches: Owen Field; Adrian Burde
- Former coaches: Jacobo Giron; Elena Pankratova
- Choreographer: Jeremy Miranda
- Retired: April 16, 2022
Medal record
Women's artistic gymnastics
Representing United States
Pan American Games
Gold medal – first place	2015 Toronto	Team
Silver medal – second place	2015 Toronto	Balance beam
Representing Florida Gators
NCAA Championships
Silver medal – second place	2022 Fort Worth	Team
Bronze medal – third place	2018 St. Louis	Team
Bronze medal – third place	2022 Fort Worth	All-around

Megan Stephanie Skaggs (born May 7, 1999) is an American former artistic gymnast. She competed at the 2015 Pan American Games and won a gold medal with the team and an individual silver medal on the balance beam. After finishing her international elite career, she joined the Florida Gators gymnastics team. She placed third in the all-around at the 2022 NCAA Championships and is a 2019 SEC co-champion on the balance beam.

== Gymnastics career ==
Skaggs began gymnastics classes when she was four years old.

Skaggs began competing in elite gymnastics in 2012, and she finished 10th in the all-around at the 2012 U.S. Classic. Then at the 2012 U.S. Championships, she finished 19th in the all-around. She tied with Grace Quinn for 12th place at the 2013 U.S. Classic. She then tied with Abby Paulson for 23rd place at the 2013 U.S. Championships. At the 2014 U.S. Classic, she finished seventh in the all-around and tied for fourth place on the uneven bars. She then finished ninth in the all-around at the 2014 U.S. Championships.

Skaggs became age-eligible for senior elite competitions in 2015. She was added to the national team in March and was selected to make her international debut at the 2015 City of Jesolo Trophy. There, she finished eighth in the all-around. She was selected to represent the United States at the 2015 Pan American Games alongside Madison Desch, Rachel Gowey, Amelia Hundley, and Emily Schild. The team won the gold medal with Skaggs contributing a score of 14.050 on the balance beam. Then in the balance beam final, she repeated her score of 14.050 to win the silver medal behind Canada's Ellie Black. At the 2015 U.S. Championships, she finished 13th in the all-around.

On March 31, 2016, Skaggs retired from elite gymnastics.

Skaggs signed the National Letter of Intent to the University of Florida and the Florida Gators gymnastics program on November 10, 2016. She began competing in the 2018 season as part of the number one ranked freshman class. She was named SEC Freshman of Week on February 27, and she helped Florida finish third at the 2018 NCAA Championships.

Skaggs scored 9.950 on the balance beam at the 2019 SEC Championships and won the event title in a five-way tie. That season, she was named to the All SEC team and received second team All-America on the uneven bars. She graduated with a bachelor's degree in advertising in August 2020 and began a master's degree in entrepreneurship. In 2021, she was named SEC Gymnast of the Week in week 3 after competing in the all-around for the first time since 2019 and winning. She competed in the all-around at the 2021 NCAA Championships and helped Florida finish fourth.

Skaggs was eligible for a fifth year of NCAA gymnastics due to competing during the COVID-19 pandemic, which she decided to take. That season, she set or matched career highs on 9.950 on all four apparatuses. At the 2022 SEC Championships, she helped Florida win the team title. Individually, she tied with teammate Leanne Wong for second place in the all-around, and she tied for second place on the balance beam. Then at the 2022 NCAA Championships, she finished third in the all-around to Trinity Thomas and Sunisa Lee. She helped Florida finish second in the team final to Oklahoma.
