= List of Southeastern Conference champions =

The Southeastern Conference (SEC) sponsors nine men's sports and thirteen women's sports. This is a list of conference champions for each sport. Also see the list of SEC national champions.

== Members ==
The SEC was established in December 1932, when the 13 members of the Southern Conference located west and south of the Appalachian Mountains left to form their own conference. Ten of the 13 founding members have remained in the conference since its inception. Three schools left the conference before 1966 and six have joined since 1991, bringing the current membership to 16.

=== Current members ===
- Alabama (since 1932)
- Arkansas (since 1991)
- Auburn (since 1932)
- Florida (since 1932)
- Georgia (since 1932)
- Kentucky (since 1932)
- LSU (since 1932)
- Mississippi (since 1932) – athletically known as "Ole Miss"
- Mississippi State (since 1932)
- Missouri (since 2012)
- Oklahoma (since 2024)
- South Carolina (since 1991)
- Tennessee (since 1932)
- Texas (since 2024)
- Texas A&M (since 2012)
- Vanderbilt (since 1932)

=== Former members ===
- Sewanee: 1932–1940
- Georgia Tech: 1932–1964
- Tulane: 1932–1966

== Current champions ==
=== Men's sports ===
Sport	Regular-season champion	Postseason champion
Baseball	Georgia (2025–26)	Georgia (2025–26)
Football	–	Georgia (2025–26)
Men's Basketball	Florida (2025–26)	Arkansas (2025–26)
Men's Cross Country	–	Alabama (2025–26)
Men's Golf	–	Ole Miss (2025-26)
Men's Indoor Track and Field	–	Arkansas (2025–26)
Men's Outdoor Track and Field	–	Arkansas (2025-26)
Men's Swimming and Diving	–	Texas (2025–26)
Men's Tennis	Texas (2025–26)	Texas (2025–26)

=== Women's sports ===
Sport	Regular-season champion	Postseason champion
Equestrian	–	Texas A&M (2025–26)
Gymnastics	Oklahoma (2025–26)	Florida (2025–26)
Rowing	–	Tennessee (2025–26)
Soccer	Vanderbilt (2026–27)	South Carolina (2026–27)
Softball	Oklahoma (2025–26)	Texas (2025–26)
Volleyball	Kentucky (2025–26)	Kentucky (2025–26)
Women's Basketball	South Carolina (2025–26)	Texas (2025–26)
Women's Cross Country	–	Florida (2025–26)
Women's Golf	–	Tennessee (2025–26)
Women's Indoor Track and Field	–	Florida (2025–26)
Women's Outdoor Track and Field	–	Florida (2025-26)
Women's Swimming and Diving	–	Texas (2025–26)
Women's Tennis	Auburn, Oklahoma, & Texas A&M (2025–26)	Auburn (2025–26)

== Baseball ==
All 16 SEC schools play baseball.

Although this article lists both regular-season and tournament champions, the SEC awards its official baseball championship based solely on regular-season record, whether or not the tournament existed at a given time. The tournament, however, does determine the SEC's automatic berth in the NCAA tournament.

The method to determine the SEC Champion has varied greatly:

- 1933-1947: Determined by conference winning percentage.
- 1948-1950: Division leaders met in best of 5 championship series.
- 1951: Determined by conference winning percentage.
- 1952: Division leaders were to meet in best of 3 championship series; Eastern division leader ceded championship series to western division leader.
- 1953-1976: Division leaders met in best of 3 championship series.
- 1977-1985: First SEC Tournament. Determined by top 2 teams from each division playing in double elimination tournament.
- 1986: Determined by top 4 teams overall playing in double elimination tournament.
- 1987: Determined by top 6 teams overall playing in double elimination tournament.
- 1988-1991: Determined by conference winning percentage. Tournament played to award NCAA auto-bid.
- 1992: Determined by conference winning percentage.
- 1993-1995: Determined by conference and tournament winning percentage. NCAA auto-bid is awarded to winner of divisional tournament that *has highest overall conference winning percentage.
- 1996-1997: Determined by conference winning percentage. Tournament played with top 3 teams in each division plus 2 at-large teams based on conference winning percentage to award NCAA auto-bid.
- 1998: Determined as before but with division leaders earning top 2 seeds in tournament.
- 1999-2012: Determined as before but tournament consisted of top 2 teams in each division plus 4 at-large teams based on conference winning percentage.

Baseball Summary
School	Last SEC Reg. Season Title	Number of SEC Reg. Season Titles	Last SEC Tourney Title	Number of SEC Tourney Titles	Number of SEC Overall Titles
**Current members**
LSU	2017	18	2017	12	30
Florida	2023	16	2015	7	23
Alabama	2006	14	2003	7	21
Mississippi State	2016	11	2012	7	19
Vanderbilt	2019	7	2025	4	11
Ole Miss	2009	8	2018	3	11
Georgia	2026	8	2026	1	9
Auburn	1978	6	1998	3	9
Tennessee	2024	5	2024	5	10
South Carolina	2002	2	2004	1	3
Arkansas	2021	3	2021	1	4
Kentucky	2006	1	never	0	1
Texas A&M	never	0	2016	1	none
Missouri	never	0	never	0	none
Oklahoma	never	0	never	0	none
Texas	2025	1	never	0	1
**Former members**
Georgia Tech	1957	1	never	0	1
Tulane	1957	0	never	0	none ^{(+1 claimed)}
The SEC Tournament determined the overall SEC Champion from 1977-87
Last team to win regular season & tournament in same year: Arkansas, 2021

=== Champions ===
Official SEC champions in bold.

Year	Regular Season or Playoff Champion(s)	Tournament Champion(s)	Eastern Champion(s)	Western Champion(s)
1933	**Georgia**	No Tournament		
1934	**Alabama**	No Tournament		
1935	**Alabama**	No Tournament		
1936	**Alabama**	No Tournament		
1937	**Auburn**	No Tournament		
1938	**Alabama**	No Tournament		
1939	**LSU**	No Tournament		
1940	**Alabama**	No Tournament		
1941	**Alabama**	No Tournament		
1942	**Alabama**	No Tournament		
1943	**LSU**	No Tournament		
1944	No Season			
1945	**LSU**	No Tournament		
1946	**LSU**	No Tournament		
1947	**Alabama**	No Tournament		
1948	**Mississippi State** (def. AU, 3–0)	No Tournament	Auburn(1)	Mississippi State (1)
1949	**Mississippi State** (def. UK, 3–1)	No Tournament	Kentucky (1)	Mississippi State (2)
1950	**Alabama** (def. UK, 3–1)	No Tournament	Kentucky (2)	Alabama (1)
1951	**Tennessee**	No Tournament		
1952	**Florida** (UT ceded series)	No Tournament	Tennessee (1)	Florida (1)
1953	**Georgia** (def. MSU, 2–0)	No Tournament	Georgia (1)	Mississippi State (3)
1954	**Georgia** (def. UM, 2–1)	No Tournament	Georgia (2)	Ole Miss (1)
1955	**Alabama** (def. UGA, 2–1)	No Tournament	Georgia (3)	Alabama (2)
1956	**Florida** (def. UM, 2–0)	No Tournament	Florida (2)	Ole Miss (2)
1957	**Georgia Tech** (def. UA, 2–1)	No Tournament	Georgia Tech	Alabama (3)
1958	**Auburn** (def. UA, 2–0)	No Tournament	Auburn (2)	Alabama (4)
1959	**Ole Miss** (def. GT, 2–1)	No Tournament	Georgia Tech	Ole Miss (3)
1960	**Ole Miss** (def. UF, 2–0)	No Tournament	Florida (3)	Ole Miss (4)
1961	**LSU** (def. AU, 2–0)	No Tournament	Auburn (3)	LSU (1)
1962	**Florida** (def. MSU, 2–1)	No Tournament	Florida (4)	Mississippi State (4)
1963	**Auburn** (def. UM, 2–1)	No Tournament	Auburn (4)	Ole Miss (5)
1964	**Ole Miss** (def. AU, 2–1)	No Tournament	Auburn (5)	Ole Miss (6)
1965	**Mississippi State** (def. AU, 2–1)	No Tournament	Auburn (6)	Mississippi State (5)
1966	**Mississippi State** (def. UT, 2–0)	No Tournament	Tennessee (2)	Mississippi State (6)
1967	**Auburn** (def. UM, 2–0)	No Tournament	Auburn (7)	LSU (2), Ole Miss (7)
1968	**Alabama** (def. UF, 2–1)	No Tournament	Florida (5)	Alabama (5), LSU (3)
1969	**Ole Miss** (def. UF, 2–0)	No Tournament	Florida (6)	Ole Miss (8)
1970	**Mississippi State** (def. UT, 2–1)	No Tournament	Tennessee (3)	Mississippi State (7)
1971	**Mississippi State** (def. VU, 2–0)	No Tournament	Vanderbilt (1)	Mississippi State (8)
1972	**Ole Miss** (def. VU, 2–0)	No Tournament	Vanderbilt (2)	Ole Miss (9)
1973	**Vanderbilt** (def. UA, 2–0)	No Tournament	Vanderbilt (3)	Alabama (6)
1974	**Vanderbilt** (def. UA, 2–0)	No Tournament	Vanderbilt (4)	Alabama (6)
1975	**LSU** (def. UG, 2–0)	No Tournament	Georgia (4)	LSU (3)
1976	**Auburn** (def. UK, 2–1)	No Tournament	Kentucky (3), Tennessee (4)	Auburn (8)
1977	Not awarded	**Ole Miss**	Florida (7)	Ole Miss (10)
1978	Not awarded	**Auburn**	Florida (8)	Auburn (9)
1979	Not awarded	**Mississippi State**	Florida (9)	Mississippi State (9)
1980	Not awarded	**Vanderbilt**	Florida (10)	Auburn (10)
1981	Not awarded	**Florida**	Florida (11)	Alabama (7), Mississippi State (10)
1982	Not awarded	**Florida**	Florida (12)	Ole Miss (11)
1983	Not awarded	**Alabama**	Florida (13)	Mississippi State (11)
1984	Not awarded	**Florida**	Florida (14)	Mississippi State (12)
1985	Not awarded	**Mississippi State**	Florida (15)	LSU (4)
1986	LSU	**LSU**		
1987	Georgia	**Mississippi State**		
1988	**Florida**	Florida		
1989	**Mississippi State**	Auburn		
1990	**LSU**	LSU, Mississippi State (game called in 4th inning due to inclement weather)		
1991	**LSU**	Florida		
1992	**LSU**	LSU	Florida (16)	LSU (5)
1993	**LSU**	Tennessee (East) / LSU (West)	Tennessee (5)	LSU (6)
1994	**Tennessee**	Tennessee (East) / LSU (West)	Tennessee (6)	LSU (7)
1995	**Tennessee**	Tennessee (East) / Alabama (West)	Tennessee (7)	Auburn (11)
1996	**Alabama, Florida, LSU**	Alabama	Florida (17)	Alabama (8), LSU (8)
1997	**LSU**	Alabama	Florida (18), Tennessee (8)	LSU (9)
1998	**Florida**	Auburn	Florida (19)	LSU (10)
1999	**Arkansas**	Alabama	South Carolina (1)	Arkansas (1)
2000	**South Carolina**	LSU	South Carolina (2)	LSU (11)
2001	**Georgia**	Mississippi State	Georgia (5)	LSU (12)
2002	**South Carolina**	Alabama	South Carolina (3)	Alabama (9)
2003	**LSU**	Alabama	South Carolina (4)	LSU (13)
2004	**Arkansas, Georgia**	South Carolina	Georgia (6)	Arkansas (2)
2005	**Florida**	Mississippi State	Florida (20)	LSU (14), Ole Miss (12)
2006	**Alabama, Kentucky**	Ole Miss	Kentucky (4)	Alabama (10)
2007	**Vanderbilt**	Vanderbilt	Vanderbilt (5)	Arkansas (3)
2008	**Georgia**	LSU	Georgia (7)	LSU (15)
2009	**LSU, Ole Miss**	LSU	Florida (21)	LSU (16), Ole Miss (13)
2010	**Florida**	LSU	Florida (22)	Auburn (12)
2011	**Florida, South Carolina, Vanderbilt**	Florida	Florida (23), South Carolina (5), Vanderbilt (6)	Arkansas (4)
2012	**LSU**	Mississippi State	South Carolina (6)	LSU (17)
2013	**Vanderbilt**	LSU	Vanderbilt (7)	LSU (18)
2014	**Florida**	LSU	Florida (23)	Ole Miss (14)
2015	**LSU**	Florida	Vanderbilt (8)	LSU (19)
2016	**Mississippi State**	Texas A&M	South Carolina (7)	Mississippi State (13)
2017	**Florida**, **LSU**	LSU	Florida (24)	LSU (20)
2018	**Florida**	Ole Miss	Florida (25)	Ole Miss (15), Arkansas (5)
2019	**Vanderbilt**	Vanderbilt	Vanderbilt (9)	Arkansas (6), Mississippi State (14)
2021	**Arkansas**	Arkansas	Tennessee (9)	Arkansas (7)
2022	**Tennessee**	Tennessee	Tennessee (10)	Texas A&M (1)
2023	**Florida, Arkansas**	Vanderbilt	Florida (26)	Arkansas (7)
2024	**Tennessee, Kentucky**	Tennessee	Tennessee (1)	Arkansas (2)
2025	**Texas**	Vanderbilt		
2026	**Georgia**	**Georgia**		

== Men's basketball ==
All 16 SEC members play men's basketball.

Although this article lists both regular-season and tournament champions, the SEC previously awarded its official men's basketball championship based solely on the regular-season record from the 1950–51 season through the 1977–78 season. Since the 1978–79 season, the tournament has determined the SEC's automatic berth in the NCAA tournament.

Men's Basketball Summary
School	Last SEC Reg. Season Title	Number of SEC Reg. Season Titles	Last SEC Tourney Title	Number of SEC Tourney Titles	Number of SEC Total Titles
**Current members**
Kentucky	2020	50	2018	32	82
Alabama	2023	10	2023	8	18
Tennessee	2024	11	2022	5	16
Florida	2026	8	2025	5	13
LSU	2019	11	1980	1	12
Mississippi State	2004	6	2009	3	9
Auburn	2025	5	2024	3	8
Vanderbilt	1993	3	2012	2	5
Arkansas	1994	2	2026	2	4
Georgia	1990	1	2008	2	3
Ole Miss	Never	0	2013	2	2
South Carolina	1997	1	Never	0	1
Texas A&M	2016	1	Never	0	1
Missouri	Never	0	Never	0	0
Oklahoma	Never	0	Never	0	0
Texas	Never	0	Never	0	0
**Former members**
Georgia Tech	1944	2	1938	1	3
Tulane	1944	1	Never	0	1
Sewanee	Never	0	Never	0	0
The SEC Tournament determined the overall SEC Champion from 1933-34 and 1936-50
Last team to win regular season & tournament in same year: Alabama, 2023

=== Champions ===
Official SEC champions in bold.

Year	Regular-season champion(s)	Tournament champion
1933	Kentucky	**Kentucky**
1934	Kentucky	**Alabama**
1935	**Kentucky, LSU**	No Tournament
1936	Kentucky	**Tennessee**
1937	Georgia Tech	**Kentucky**
1938	Kentucky	**Georgia Tech**
1939	Alabama	**Kentucky**
1940	Alabama	**Kentucky**
1941	Kentucky,Tennessee	**Tennessee**
1942	Tennessee,Kentucky	**Kentucky**
1943	Kentucky,Tennessee	**Tennessee**
1944	Georgia Tech, Tulane	**Kentucky**
1945	Kentucky, Tennessee	**Kentucky**
1946	Kentucky, LSU	**Kentucky**
1947	Kentucky	**Kentucky**
1948	Kentucky	**Kentucky**
1949	Kentucky	**Kentucky**
1950	Kentucky	**Kentucky**
1951	**Kentucky**	Vanderbilt
1952	**Kentucky**	Kentucky
1953	**LSU**	No Tournament
1954	**Kentucky, LSU**	(Kentucky def. LSU in single-game playoff)
1955	**Kentucky**	No Tournament
1956	**Alabama**	No Tournament
1957	**Kentucky**	No Tournament
1958	**Kentucky**	No Tournament
1959	**Mississippi State**	No Tournament
1960	**Auburn**	No Tournament
1961	**Mississippi State**	(Kentucky def. VU in single-game playoff)
1962	**Kentucky, Mississippi State**	No Tournament
1963	**Mississippi State**	No Tournament
1964	**Kentucky**	No Tournament
1965	**Vanderbilt**	No Tournament
1966	**Kentucky**	No Tournament
1967	**Tennessee**	No Tournament
1968	**Kentucky**	No Tournament
1969	**Kentucky**	No Tournament
1970	**Kentucky**	No Tournament
1971	**Kentucky**	No Tournament
1972	**Kentucky, Tennessee**	No Tournament
1973	**Kentucky**	No Tournament
1974	**Alabama, Vanderbilt**	No Tournament
1975	**Alabama, Kentucky**	No Tournament
1976	**Alabama**	No Tournament
1977	**Kentucky, Tennessee**	No Tournament
1978	**Kentucky**	No Tournament
1979	**LSU**	Tennessee
1980	**Kentucky**	LSU
1981	**LSU**	Ole Miss
1982	**Kentucky, Tennessee**	Alabama
1983	**Kentucky**	Georgia
1984	**Kentucky**	Kentucky
1985	**LSU**	Auburn
1986	**Kentucky**	Kentucky
1987	**Alabama**	Alabama
1988	Kentucky	Kentucky
1989	**Florida**	Alabama
1990	**Georgia**	Alabama
1991	**LSU, Mississippi State**	Alabama
1992	**Arkansas**	Kentucky
1993	**Vanderbilt**	Kentucky
1994	**Arkansas**	Kentucky
1995	**Kentucky**	Kentucky
1996	**Kentucky**	Mississippi State
1997	**South Carolina**	Kentucky
1998	**Kentucky**	Kentucky
1999	**Auburn**	Kentucky
2000	**Florida, Kentucky, LSU, Tennessee**	Arkansas
2001	**Florida, Kentucky**	Kentucky
2002	**Alabama**	Mississippi State
2003	**Kentucky**	Kentucky
2004	**Mississippi State**	Kentucky
2005	**Kentucky**	Florida
2006	**LSU**	Florida
2007	**Florida**	Florida
2008	**Tennessee**	Georgia
2009	**LSU**	Mississippi State
2010	**Kentucky**	Kentucky
2011	**Florida**	Kentucky
2012	**Kentucky**	Vanderbilt
2013	**Florida**	Ole Miss
2014	**Florida**	Florida
2015	**Kentucky**	Kentucky
2016	**Kentucky, Texas A&M**	Kentucky
2017	**Kentucky**	Kentucky
2018	**Auburn, Tennessee**	Kentucky
2019	**LSU**	Auburn
2020	**Kentucky**	Tournament Canceled
2021	**Alabama**	Alabama
2022	**Auburn**	Tennessee
2023	**Alabama**	Alabama
2024	**Tennessee**	Auburn
2025	**Auburn**	Florida
2026	**Florida**	Arkansas

=== Division champions (1992–2011) ===
When the SEC expanded to 12 schools with the addition of South Carolina and Arkansas for the 1992 season, the conference divided its basketball teams into separate divisions, East and West, just like for football. In June 2011, the SEC voted to eliminate divisions in basketball.

Year	East champion(s)	West champion(s)
1992	Kentucky	Arkansas
1993	Vanderbilt	Arkansas
1994	Florida, Kentucky	Arkansas
1995	Kentucky	Arkansas, Mississippi State
1996	Kentucky	Mississippi State
1997	South Carolina	Ole Miss
1998	Kentucky	Ole Miss
1999	Tennessee	Auburn
2000	Florida, Kentucky, Tennessee	LSU
2001	Florida, Kentucky	Ole Miss
2002	Florida, Georgia, Kentucky	Alabama
2003	Kentucky	Mississippi State
2004	Kentucky	Mississippi State
2005	Kentucky	Alabama, LSU
2006	Tennessee	LSU
2007	Florida	Mississippi State, Ole Miss
2008	Tennessee	Mississippi State
2009	South Carolina, Tennessee	LSU
2010	Kentucky	Mississippi State, Ole Miss
2011	Florida	Alabama

== Women's basketball ==
All 16 SEC members play women's basketball.

Although the SEC began sponsoring women's basketball competition in the 1979–80 season, it was not fully integrated into the conference until the 1982–83 season, which was the first in which each team played the same number of conference games. Also, although this article lists both regular-season and tournament champions, the SEC has officially awarded its conference title based solely on the regular-season standings since the 1985–86 season. From 1980 to 1985, the official SEC champion was the tournament winner, but the tournament now only determines the recipient of the SEC's automatic berth in the NCAA tournament.

Women's Basketball Summary
School	Last SEC Reg. Season Title	Number of SEC Reg. Season Titles	Last SEC Tourney Title	Number of SEC Tourney Titles
Current members
Tennessee	2015	18	2014	17
South Carolina	2026	10	2025	9
Georgia	2000	7	2001	4
Auburn	2009	5	1997	4
Vanderbilt	never	0	2009	6
LSU	2006	3	2003	2
Kentucky	2012	2	2022	2
Mississippi State	2019	2	2019	1
Texas	2025	1	2026	1
Texas A&M	2021	1	2013	1
Ole Miss	1992	1	never	0
Alabama	never	0	never	0
Arkansas	never	0	never	0
Florida	never	0	never	0
Missouri	never	0	never	0
Oklahoma	never	0	never	0
Last team to win regular season & tournament in same year: South Carolina, 2025

=== Champions ===
Year	Regular-season champion(s)	Tournament champion
1980	Tennessee	Tennessee
1981	Auburn	Auburn
1982	Kentucky	Kentucky
1983	Tennessee	Georgia
1984	Georgia; Tennessee	Georgia
1985	Ole Miss	Tennessee
1986	Georgia	Georgia
1987	Auburn	Auburn
1988	Auburn	Tennessee
1989	Auburn	Tennessee
1990	Tennessee	Auburn
1991	Georgia	LSU
1992	Ole Miss	Tennessee
1993	Tennessee	Vanderbilt
1994	Tennessee	Tennessee
1995	Tennessee	Vanderbilt
1996	Georgia	Tennessee
1997	Georgia	Auburn
1998	Tennessee	Tennessee
1999	Tennessee	Tennessee
2000	Georgia; Tennessee	Tennessee
2001	Tennessee	Georgia
2002	Tennessee	Vanderbilt
2003	Tennessee	LSU
2004	Tennessee	Vanderbilt
2005	LSU	Tennessee
2006	LSU	Tennessee
2007	Tennessee	Vanderbilt
2008	LSU	Tennessee
2009	Auburn	Vanderbilt
2010	Tennessee	Tennessee
2011	Tennessee	Tennessee
2012	Kentucky	Tennessee
2013	Tennessee	Texas A&M
2014	South Carolina	Tennessee
2015	South Carolina; Tennessee	South Carolina
2016	South Carolina	South Carolina
2017	South Carolina	South Carolina
2018	Mississippi State	South Carolina
2019	Mississippi State	Mississippi State
2020	South Carolina	South Carolina
2021	Texas A&M	South Carolina
2022	South Carolina	Kentucky
2023	South Carolina	South Carolina
2024	South Carolina	South Carolina
2025	South Carolina; Texas	South Carolina
2026	South Carolina	Texas

== Cross country ==
All current SEC members participate in men's and women's cross country except South Carolina, which only fields a women's team.

Women's Cross Country Summary
School	Last SEC Title	Number of SEC Titles
Current members
Arkansas	2021	22
Florida	2025	8
Tennessee	2005	5
Alabama	2026	5
Kentucky	1989	3
Vanderbilt	2011	1
Auburn	never	0
Georgia	never	0
LSU	never	0
Mississippi State	never	0
Missouri	never	0
Oklahoma	never	0
Ole Miss	never	0
South Carolina	never	0
Texas	never	0
Texas A&M	never	0

Men's Cross Country Summary
School	Last SEC Title	Number of SEC Titles
Current members
Arkansas	2024	29
Tennessee	1990	25
Auburn	1980	6
Alabama	2026	6
Mississippi State	1962	5
Kentucky	1988	4
Florida	1987	3
Ole Miss	2019	2
Georgia	never	0
LSU	never	0
Missouri	never	0
Oklahoma	never	0
Texas	never	0
Texas A&M	never	0
Vanderbilt	never	0
Former members
Georgia Tech	1954	10

Year	Men's champion	Women's champion
1935	Georgia Tech	
1936	Georgia Tech	
1937	Georgia Tech	
1938	Georgia Tech	
1939	Georgia Tech	
1940	Georgia Tech	
1941	Mississippi State	
1942	Georgia Tech	
1943–45	No event scheduled	
1946	Auburn	
1947	Georgia Tech	
1948	Auburn	
1949	Tennessee	
1950	Tennessee	
1951	Tennessee	
1952	Tennessee	
1953	Georgia Tech	
1954	Georgia Tech	
1955	Auburn; Florida	
1956	Tennessee	
1957	Mississippi State	
1958	Kentucky	
1959	Kentucky	
1960	Mississippi State	
1961	Mississippi State	
1962	Mississippi State	
1963	Tennessee	
1964	Auburn	
1965	Tennessee	
1966	Tennessee	
1967	Tennessee	
1968	Tennessee	
1969	Tennessee	
1970	Kentucky	
1971	Tennessee	
1972	Tennessee	
1973	Alabama	
1974	Tennessee	
1975	Tennessee	
1976	Tennessee	
1977	Tennessee	
1978	Tennessee	
1979	Auburn	
1980	Auburn	
1981	Tennessee	
1982	Tennessee	
1983	Tennessee	Tennessee
1984	Tennessee	Florida
1985	Tennessee	Kentucky
1986	Florida	Alabama
1987	Florida	Alabama
1988	Kentucky	Kentucky
1989	Tennessee	Kentucky
1990	Tennessee	Tennessee
1991	Arkansas	Arkansas
1992	Arkansas	Arkansas
1993	Arkansas	Arkansas
1994	Arkansas	Arkansas
1995	Arkansas	Arkansas
1996	Arkansas	Florida
1997	Arkansas	Florida
1998	Arkansas	Arkansas
1999	Arkansas	Arkansas
2000	Arkansas	Arkansas
2001	Arkansas	Arkansas
2002	Arkansas	Arkansas
2003	Arkansas	Tennessee
2004	Arkansas	Tennessee
2005	Arkansas	Tennessee
2006	Arkansas	Arkansas
2007	Arkansas	Arkansas
2008	Alabama	Arkansas
2009	Alabama	Florida
2010	Arkansas	Florida
2011	Arkansas	Vanderbilt
2012	Arkansas	Florida
2013	Arkansas	Arkansas
2014	Arkansas	Arkansas
2015	Arkansas	Arkansas
2016	Arkansas	Arkansas
2017	Arkansas	Arkansas
2018	Ole Miss	Arkansas
2019	Ole Miss	Arkansas
2020	Arkansas	Arkansas
2021	Arkansas	Arkansas
2022	Alabama	Alabama
2023	Arkansas	Florida
2024	Arkansas	Alabama
2025	Alabama	Florida

== Equestrian ==
Four SEC schools compete in Women's Equestrian: Auburn, Georgia, South Carolina and Texas A&M. The first conference championship was contested in 2013.

Equestrian Summary
School	Last SEC Title	Number SEC Titles
Current members
Auburn	2024	7
Georgia	2018	3
South Carolina	2025	3
Texas A&M	2026	1

=== Champions ===
Year	Champion
2013	South Carolina
2014	South Carolina
2015	Georgia
2016	Auburn
2017	Georgia
2018	Georgia
2019	Auburn
2020	Auburn
2021	Auburn
2022	Auburn
2023	Auburn
2024	Auburn
2025	South Carolina
2026	Texas A&M

== Football ==
All 16 SEC schools play football.

=== Champions ===
Football summary
School	Last SEC title	Number of SEC titles	Number of SEC divisional titles
Current members
Alabama	2023	30	16
Georgia	2025	16	13
Tennessee	1998	13	6
LSU	2019	12	10
Florida	2008	8 ^{(+1 vacated)}	15
Auburn	2013	8	6
Ole Miss	1963	6	1
Kentucky	1976	2	0
Mississippi State	1941	1	1
Arkansas	Never	0	3
Missouri	Never	0	2
South Carolina	Never	0	1
Oklahoma	Never	0	N/A
Texas	Never	0	N/A
Texas A&M	Never	0	0
Vanderbilt	Never	0	0
Former members
Georgia Tech	1952	5	N/A
Tulane	1949	3	N/A
Sewanee	Never	0	N/A

==== Pre-championship game era (1933–1991) ====
Year	Teams(s)	Record(s)
1933	Alabama	5–0–1
1934	Alabama; Tulane	7–0; 8–0
1935	LSU	5–0
1936	LSU	6–0
1937	Alabama	6–0
1938	Tennessee	7–0
1939	Georgia Tech; Tennessee; Tulane	6–0; 6–0; 5–0
1940	Tennessee	5–0
1941	Mississippi State	4–0–1
1942	Georgia	6–1
1943	Georgia Tech	3–0
1944	Georgia Tech	4–0
1945	Alabama	6–0
1946	Georgia; Tennessee	5–0; 5–0
1947	Ole Miss	6–1
1948	Georgia	6–0
1949	Tulane	5–1
1950	Kentucky	5–1
1951	Georgia Tech; Tennessee	7–0; 5–0
1952	Georgia Tech	7–0
1953	Alabama	4–0–3
1954	Ole Miss	5–0
1955	Ole Miss	5–1
1956	Tennessee	6–0
1957	Auburn	7–0
1958	LSU	6–0
1959	Georgia	7–0
1960	Ole Miss	5–0–1
1961	Alabama; LSU	7–0; 6–0
1962	Ole Miss	6–0
1963	Ole Miss	5–0–1
1964	Alabama	8–0
1965	Alabama	6–1–1
1966	Alabama; Georgia	6–0; 5–0
1967	Tennessee	6–0
1968	Georgia	5–0–1
1969	Tennessee	5–1
1970	LSU	5–0
1971	Alabama	7–0
1972	Alabama	7–1
1973	Alabama	8–0
1974	Alabama	6–0
1975	Alabama	6–0
1976	Georgia; Kentucky	5–1; 5–1
1977	Alabama	7–0
1978	Alabama	6–0
1979	Alabama	6–0
1980	Georgia	6–0
1981	Alabama; Georgia	6–0; 6–0
1982	Georgia	6–0
1983	Auburn	6–0
1984	Florida (vacated)	5–0–1
1985	Tennessee	5–1
1986	LSU	5–1
1987	Auburn	5–0–1
1988	Auburn	6–1
1989	Alabama; Auburn; Tennessee	6–1; 6–1; 6–1
1990	Tennessee	5–1–1
1991	Florida	7–0

==== Championship game era (1992–present) ====
Year	Winning team	Record	Score	Losing team	Record
1992	Alabama ^{W}	8–0	28–21	Florida ^{E}	6–2
1993	Florida ^{E}	7–1	28–13	Alabama ^{W}	5–2–1
1994	Florida ^{E}	7–1	24–23	Alabama ^{W}	8–0
1995	Florida ^{E}	8–0	34–3	Arkansas ^{W}	6–2
1996	Florida ^{E}	8–0	45–30	Alabama ^{W}	6–2
1997	Tennessee ^{E}	7–1	30–29	Auburn ^{W}	6–2
1998	Tennessee ^{E}	8–0	24–14	Mississippi State ^{W}	6–2
1999	Alabama ^{W}	7–1	34–7	Florida ^{E}	7–1
2000	Florida ^{E}	7–1	28–6	Auburn ^{W}	6–2
2001	LSU ^{W}	5–3	31–20	Tennessee ^{E}	7–1
2002	Georgia ^{E}	7–1	30–3	Arkansas ^{W}	5–3
2003	LSU ^{W}	7–1	34–13	Georgia ^{E}	6–2
2004	Auburn ^{W}	8–0	38–28	Tennessee ^{E}	7–1
2005	Georgia ^{E}	6–2	34–14	LSU ^{W}	7–1
2006	Florida ^{E}	7–1	38–28	Arkansas ^{W}	7–1
2007	LSU ^{W}	6–2	21–14	Tennessee ^{E}	6–2
2008	Florida ^{E}	7–1	31–20	Alabama ^{W}	8–0
2009	Alabama ^{W}	8–0	32–13	Florida ^{E}	8–0
2010	Auburn ^{W}	8–0	56–17	South Carolina ^{E}	5–3
2011	LSU ^{W}	8–0	42–10	Georgia ^{E}	7–1
2012	Alabama ^{W}	7–1	32–28	Georgia ^{E}	7–1
2013	Auburn ^{W}	7–1	59–42	Missouri ^{E}	7–1
2014	Alabama ^{W}	7–1	42–13	Missouri ^{E}	7–1
2015	Alabama ^{W}	7–1	29–15	Florida ^{E}	7–1
2016	Alabama ^{W}	8–0	54–16	Florida ^{E}	6–2
2017	Georgia ^{E}	7–1	28–7	Auburn ^{W}	7–1
2018	Alabama ^{W}	8–0	35–28	Georgia ^{E}	7–1
2019	LSU ^{W}	8–0	37–10	Georgia ^{E}	7–1
2020	Alabama ^{W}	10–0	52–46	Florida ^{E}	8–2
2021	Alabama ^{W}	7–1	41–24	Georgia ^{E}	8–0
2022	Georgia ^{E}	8-0	50–30	LSU ^{W}	6-2
2023	Alabama ^{W}	8-0	27-24	Georgia ^{E}	8-0
2024	Georgia ^{2}	6-2	22-19 ^{OT}	Texas ^{1}	7-1
2025	Georgia ^{2}	7-1	28-7	Alabama ^{1}	7-1

=== Divisional champions ===
From 1992 through 2023, divisional champions were crowned. Occasionally, a tie between two or more teams occurred, requiring a tiebreaker. All teams involved in the tiebreaker were considered co-divisional champions, and the winner of the tiebreaker was the division's representative to the championship game. The 2023 season was the last for the divisional format. All divisional champions and co-champions are listed below.

Year	East Division champion(s)	West Division champion(s)
1992	Florida*, Georgia	Alabama
1993	Florida	Alabama†
1994	Florida	Alabama
1995	Florida	Arkansas
1996	Florida	Alabama*, LSU
1997	Tennessee	Auburn*, LSU
1998	Tennessee	Mississippi State*, Arkansas
1999	Florida	Alabama
2000	Florida	Auburn
2001	Tennessee	LSU*, Auburn
2002	Georgia	Arkansas*^{‡}, Auburn, LSU
2003	Georgia*, Florida, Tennessee	LSU*, Mississippi
2004	Tennessee	Auburn
2005	Georgia	LSU*, Auburn
2006	Florida	Arkansas
2007	Tennessee*, Georgia	LSU
2008	Florida	Alabama
2009	Florida	Alabama
2010	South Carolina	Auburn
2011	Georgia	LSU
2012	Georgia*, Florida	Alabama
2013	Missouri	Auburn*, Alabama
2014	Missouri	Alabama
2015	Florida	Alabama
2016	Florida	Alabama
2017	Georgia	Auburn*, Alabama
2018	Georgia	Alabama
2019	Georgia	LSU
2020	Florida	Alabama
2021	Georgia	Alabama
2022	Georgia	LSU*, Alabama
2023	Georgia	Alabama

* denotes tie-break winner and subsequent division representative to the SEC championship game.
^{†} in 1993 Auburn finished first in the West standings but was ineligible due to NCAA probation and postseason ban.
^{‡} in 2002 Alabama finished first in the West standings but was ineligible due to NCAA probation and postseason ban.

=== Southern Conference football champions ===
The Southern Conference was an immediate predecessor to the SEC, with all thirteen charter SEC schools having been members before leaving to form the SEC after the 1932 season.

=== Southern Intercollegiate Athletic Association ===
The Southern Intercollegiate Athletic Association (SIAA) was a predecessor to the Southern Conference, with every current and former member of the SEC having been members at some point except Arkansas, Missouri, and Oklahoma.

== Golf ==
All 16 SEC schools play both men's and women's golf.

Women's Golf Summary
School	Last SEC Title	Number of SEC Titles
Current members
Georgia	2007	11
Auburn	2021	10
Florida	2017	9
Alabama	2016	3
LSU	2022	2
South Carolina	2025	2
Texas A&M	2023	2
Vanderbilt	2014	2
Arkansas	2018	1
Mississippi State	2024	1
Ole Miss	2019	1
Tennessee	2026	1
Kentucky	never	0
Missouri	never	0
Oklahoma	never	0
Texas	never	0

Men's Golf Summary
School	Last SEC Title	Number of SEC Titles
Current members
Georgia	2016	29
Florida	2025	17
LSU	2015	16
Alabama	2014	5
Auburn	2024	5
Tennessee	2007	3
Vanderbilt	2022	3
Mississippi State	1997	2
Ole Miss	2026	2
Arkansas	1995	1
Kentucky	2005	1
Missouri	never	0
Oklahoma	never	0
South Carolina	never	0
Texas	never	0
Texas A&M	never	0
Former members
Georgia Tech	1949	1

Year	Men's champion	Men's site	Women's champion	Women's Site
1937	LSU	Baton Rouge, LA		
1938	LSU	Baton Rouge, LA		
1939	LSU	Baton Rouge, LA		
1940	LSU	Athens, GA		
1941	Georgia	Athens, GA		
1942	LSU	Athens, GA		
1943-45	No Tournament			
1946	LSU	Athens, GA		
1947	LSU	Athens, GA		
1948	LSU	Athens, GA		
1949	Georgia Tech	Athens, GA		
1950	Georgia	Athens, GA		
1951	Georgia	Athens, GA		
1952	Georgia	Athens, GA		
1953	LSU	Athens, GA		
1954	LSU	Athens, GA		
1955	Florida	Athens, GA		
1956	Florida	Athens, GA		
1957	Georgia	Athens, GA		
1958	Georgia	Athens, GA		
1959	Georgia	Athens, GA		
1960	LSU	Athens, GA		
1961	Georgia	Athens, GA		
1962	Georgia	Athens, GA		
1963	Georgia	Athens, GA		
1964	Georgia	Athens, GA		
1965	Georgia	Athens, GA		
1966	LSU	Baton Rouge, LA		
1967	LSU	Gainesville, FL		
1968	Florida	Knoxville, TN		
1969	Georgia	Athens, GA		
1970	Georgia	Pine Mountain, GA		
1971	Georgia	Pine Mountain, GA		
1972	Georgia	Pine Mountain, GA		
1973	Florida	Pine Mountain, GA		
1974	Florida	Dothan, AL		
1975	Florida	Dothan, AL		
1976	Auburn	Decatur, AL		
1977	Georgia	Decatur, AL		
1978	Georgia	Birmingham, AL		
1979	Alabama	Birmingham, AL		
1980	Tennessee	Augusta, GA		
1981	Auburn	Augusta, GA	Florida	
1982	Georgia	Augusta, GA	Florida	
1983	Georgia	Augusta, GA	Georgia	
1984	Ole Miss	Augusta, GA	Florida	
1985	Florida	Florence, AL	Georgia	
1986	LSU	Florence, AL	Florida	
1987	LSU	Florence, AL	Florida	
1988	Georgia	Florence, AL	Georgia	
1989	Florida	Louisville, KY	Auburn	
1990	Tennessee	Jackson, MS	Georgia	
1991	Florida	West Point, MS	Florida	
1992	Florida	St. Francisville, LA	LSU	
1993	Florida	Jacksonville, FL	Georgia	
1994	Florida	Fairfield Glade, TN	Georgia	
1995	Arkansas	Nashville, TN	Florida	
1996	Mississippi State	Birmingham, AL	Auburn	
1997	Mississippi State	Opelika, AL	Georgia	
1998	Georgia	Athens, GA	Georgia	
1999	Florida	Lexington, KY	Georgia	
2000	Georgia	Killen, AL	Auburn	
2001	Georgia	Sea Island, GA	Georgia	
2002	Auburn	Sea Island, GA	South Carolina	
2003	Florida	Sea Island, GA	Auburn	
2004	Georgia	Sea Island, GA	Vanderbilt	
2005	Kentucky	Sea Island, GA	Auburn	
2006	Georgia	Sea Island, GA	Auburn	
2007	Tennessee	Sea Island, GA	Georgia	
2008	Alabama	Sea Island, GA	Florida	
2009	Georgia	Sea Island, GA	Auburn	
2010	Georgia	Sea Island, GA	Alabama	
2011	Florida	Sea Island, GA	Auburn	
2012	Alabama	Sea Island, GA	Auburn	
2013	Alabama	Sea Island, GA	Alabama	
2014	Alabama	Sea Island, GA	Vanderbilt	
2015	LSU	Sea Island, GA	Texas A&M	
2016	Georgia	Sea Island, GA	Alabama	
2017	Vanderbilt	Sea Island, GA	Florida	
2018	Auburn	Sea Island, GA	Arkansas	
2019	Arkansas	Sea Island, GA	Ole Miss	Hoover, AL
2020	Season canceled due to COVID-19			
2021	Vanderbilt	Sea Island, GA	Auburn	Hoover, AL
2022	Vanderbilt	Sea Island, GA	LSU	Hoover, AL
2023	Florida	Sea Island, GA	Texas A&M	Hoover, AL
2024	Auburn	Sea Island, GA	Mississippi State	Belleair, FL
2025	Florida	Sea Island, GA	South Carolina	Belleair, FL
2026	Ole Miss	Sea Island, GA	Tennessee	Belleair, FL

== Women's gymnastics ==
Nine SEC schools participate in women's gymnastics: Alabama, Arkansas, Auburn, Florida, Georgia, Kentucky, LSU, Missouri, and Oklahoma. Oklahoma has a men's gymnastics team in the Mountain Pacific Sports Federation.

In 2017, the SEC began recognizing a regular season champion in addition to the winner of the SEC championship meet. LSU claimed the first regular season title.

Gymnastics Summary
School	Last SEC championship meet title	Number of SEC Championship meet titles	Last SEC regular-season titles	Number of SEC regular-season titles	Total SEC championships
Current members
Florida	2026	13	2024	6	19
Georgia	2008	16	never	0	16
Alabama	2021	10	never	0	10
LSU	2025	6	2025	3	9
Oklahoma	never	0	2026	2	2
Arkansas	never	0	never	0	0
Auburn	never	0	never	0	0
Kentucky	never	0	never	0	0
Missouri	never	0	never	0	0
Last team to win SEC championship and national championship in same year: Florida, 2013

=== Champions ===
Year	Regular-season champion(s)	Championship meet (overall) champion
1981		LSU
1982		Florida
1983		Florida
1984		Florida
1985		Florida
1986		Georgia
1987		Georgia
1988		Alabama
1989		Florida
1990		Alabama
1991		Georgia
1992		Georgia
1993		Georgia
1994		Georgia
1995		Alabama
1996		Georgia
1997		Georgia
1998		Georgia
1999		Georgia
2000		Alabama
2001		Georgia
2002		Georgia
2003		Alabama
2004		Georgia
2005		Georgia
2006		Georgia
2007		Florida
2008		Georgia
2009		Alabama
2010		Florida
2011		Alabama
2012		Florida
2013		Florida
2014		Alabama
2015		Alabama
2016		Florida
2017	LSU	LSU
2018	LSU	LSU
2019	Florida	LSU
2020	Florida	N/A
2021	Florida	Alabama
2022	Florida	Florida
2023	Florida	Florida
2024	Florida	LSU
2025	LSU & Oklahoma	LSU
2026	Oklahoma	Florida

== Women's rowing ==
The SEC added women's rowing for the 2024–25 school year with four programs—Alabama, Oklahoma, Tennessee, and Texas.

Rowing Summary
School	Last SEC championship meet title	Number of SEC Championship meet titles	Total SEC championships
Current members
Tennessee	2026	1	1
Texas	2025	1	1
Alabama	never	0	0
Oklahoma	never	0	0

=== Champions ===
Year	Championship meet winner
2025	Texas
2026	Tennessee

== Indoor track and field ==
All current SEC schools participate in both men's and women's indoor track & field except Vanderbilt, which once sponsored the sport for both sexes but now sponsors it only for women.

Women's Indoor Track and Field Summary
School	Last SEC Title	Number of SEC Titles
Current members
Arkansas	2025	15
LSU	2011	12
Florida	2026	9
Tennessee	2009	4
Alabama	1994	1 ^{(+1 vacated)}
Georgia	2006	1
Auburn	never	0
Kentucky	never	0
Mississippi State	never	0
Missouri	never	0
Oklahoma	never	0
Ole Miss	never	0
South Carolina	never	0
Texas	never	0
Texas A&M	never	0
Vanderbilt	never	0

Men's Indoor Track and Field Summary
School	Last SEC Title	Number of SEC Titles
Current members
Arkansas	2026	28
Tennessee	1996	18
Florida	2019	8
Alabama	2018	6
LSU	1990	4
Auburn	1980	4
Kentucky	1960	1
Texas A&M	2025	1
Georgia	never	0
Mississippi State	never	0
Missouri	never	0
Ole Miss	never	0
South Carolina	never	0
Oklahoma	never	0
Texas	never	0
Vanderbilt	never	0

Year	Men's champion	Women's champion
1957	LSU	
1958	Alabama	
1959	Alabama	
1960	Kentucky	
1961	Alabama	
1962	Alabama	
1963	LSU	
1964	Tennessee	
1965	Tennessee	
1966	Tennessee	
1967	Tennessee	
1968	Tennessee	
1969	Tennessee	
1970	Tennessee	
1971	Tennessee	
1972	Alabama	
1973	Tennessee	
1974	Tennessee	
1975	Florida	
1976	Florida	
1977	Auburn	
1978	Auburn	
1979	Auburn	
1980	Auburn	
1981	Tennessee	
1982	Tennessee	
1983	Tennessee	
1984	Tennessee	Tennessee
1985	Tennessee	LSU
1986	Tennessee	Alabama (vacated)
1987	Florida	LSU
1988	Florida	LSU
1989	LSU	LSU
1990	LSU	Florida
1991	Tennessee	LSU
1992	Arkansas	Florida
1993	Arkansas	LSU
1994	Arkansas	Alabama
1995	Arkansas	LSU
1996	Tennessee	LSU
1997	Arkansas	Florida
1998	Arkansas	LSU
1999	Arkansas	LSU
2000	Arkansas	Arkansas
2001	Arkansas	Arkansas
2002	Arkansas	Florida
2003	Arkansas	Arkansas
2004	Florida	Florida
2005	Arkansas	Tennessee
2006	Arkansas	Georgia
2007	Arkansas	Tennessee
2008	Arkansas	LSU
2009	Arkansas	Tennessee
2010	Arkansas	Florida
2011	Florida	LSU
2012	Arkansas	Florida
2013	Arkansas	Arkansas
2014	Arkansas	Florida
2015	Florida	Arkansas
2016	Arkansas	Arkansas
2017	Arkansas	Arkansas
2018	Alabama	Arkansas
2019	Florida	Arkansas
2020	Arkansas	Arkansas
2021	Arkansas	Arkansas
2022	Arkansas	Arkansas
2023	Arkansas	Arkansas
2024	Arkansas	Arkansas
2025	Texas A&M	Arkansas
2026	Arkansas	Florida

== Outdoor track and field ==
All current SEC schools participate in outdoor track & field for both sexes except for Vanderbilt, which sponsors the sport only for women.

Women's Outdoor Track and Field Summary
School	Last SEC Title	Number of SEC Titles
Current members
LSU	2024	13
Arkansas	2023	10
Florida	2026	8
Tennessee	1984	4
South Carolina	2005	3
Alabama	1994	2
Georgia	2025	3
Texas A&M	2013	1
Auburn	never	0
Kentucky	never	0
Mississippi State	never	0
Missouri	never	0
Oklahoma	never	0
Ole Miss	never	0
Texas	never	0
Vanderbilt	never	0

Outdoor Men's Track and Field Summary
School	Last SEC Title	Number of SEC Titles
Current members
Arkansas	2026	25
Tennessee	2007	25
LSU	2019	23
Florida	2018	6
Auburn	1979	4
Alabama	1980	3
Texas A&M	2017	2
Georgia	1937	1
Mississippi State	1962	1
Kentucky	never	0
Missouri	never	0
Oklahoma	never	0
Ole Miss	never	0
South Carolina	never	0
Texas	never	0
Former members
Georgia Tech	1949	3

Year	Men's champion	Women's champion
1933	LSU	
1934	LSU	
1935	LSU	
1936	LSU	
1937	Georgia	
1938	LSU	
1939	LSU	
1940	LSU	
1941	LSU	
1942	LSU	
1943	LSU	
1944	Georgia Tech	
1945	Georgia Tech	
1946	LSU	
1947	LSU	
1948	LSU	
1949	Georgia Tech	
1950	Alabama	
1951	LSU	
1952	Alabama	
1953	Florida	
1954	Auburn	
1955	Auburn	
1956	Florida	
1957	LSU	
1958	LSU	
1959	LSU	
1960	LSU	
1961	Auburn	
1962	Mississippi State	
1963	LSU	
1964	Tennessee	
1965	Tennessee	
1966	Tennessee	
1967	Tennessee	
1968	Tennessee	
1969	Tennessee	
1970	Tennessee	
1971	Tennessee	
1972	Tennessee	
1973	Tennessee	
1974	Tennessee	
1975	Tennessee	
1976	Tennessee	
1977	Tennessee	
1978	Tennessee	
1979	Auburn	
1980	Alabama	
1981	Tennessee	Tennessee
1982	Tennessee	Tennessee
1983	Tennessee	Tennessee
1984	Tennessee	Tennessee
1985	Tennessee	LSU
1986	Tennessee	Alabama
1987	Florida	LSU
1988	LSU	LSU
1989	LSU	LSU
1990	LSU	LSU
1991	Tennessee	LSU
1992	Arkansas	Florida
1993	Arkansas	LSU
1994	Arkansas	Alabama
1995	Arkansas	Georgia
1996	Arkansas	LSU
1997	Arkansas	Florida
1998	Arkansas	Florida
1999	Arkansas	South Carolina
2000	Arkansas	Arkansas
2001	Tennessee	Arkansas
2002	Tennessee	South Carolina
2003	Arkansas	Florida
2004	Arkansas	Arkansas
2005	Arkansas	South Carolina
2006	Arkansas	Georgia
2007	Tennessee	LSU
2008	Arkansas	LSU
2009	Arkansas	Florida
2010	Florida	LSU
2011	Arkansas	LSU
2012	Arkansas	LSU
2013	Arkansas	Texas A&M
2014	Texas A&M	Arkansas
2015	Florida	Arkansas
2016	Arkansas	Arkansas
2017	Texas A&M	Arkansas
2018	Florida	Florida
2019	LSU	Arkansas
2020	Season canceled due to COVID-19	
2021	Arkansas	Arkansas
2022	Arkansas	Florida
2023	Arkansas	Arkansas
2024	Arkansas	LSU
2025	Arkansas	Georgia
2026	Arkansas	Florida

== Soccer ==
All 16 schools play women's soccer. While only women's soccer is sponsored by the SEC, Kentucky and South Carolina both have men's soccer teams in the Sun Belt Conference.

Soccer Summary
School	Last SEC Reg. Season Title	Number of SEC Reg. Season Titles	Last SEC Tourney Title	Number of SEC Tourney Titles
Current members
Florida	2015	14	2016	12
Tennessee	2005	3	2021	5
Vanderbilt	2026	4	2025	4
South Carolina	2017	3	2026	4
Texas A&M	2020–21	3	2017	3
Arkansas	2025	5	never	0
Kentucky	1995	1	2006	2
Auburn	2002	1	2011	1
Alabama	2022	1	never	0
LSU	never	0	2018	1
Georgia	never	0	2023	1
Ole Miss	never	0	never	0
Mississippi State	2024	1	never	0
Missouri	never	0	never	0
Oklahoma	never	0	never	0
Texas	never	0	2024	1
Last team to win regular season & tournament in same year: Florida, 2015

=== Champions ===
Year	Regular-season champion(s)	Tournament champion
1993	Vanderbilt	Vanderbilt
1994	Vanderbilt	Vanderbilt
1995	Kentucky	Kentucky
1996	Florida	Florida
1997	Florida	Florida
1998	Florida	Florida
1999	Florida	Florida
2000	Florida	Florida
2001	Florida	Florida
2002	Auburn	Tennessee
2003	Tennessee	Tennessee
2004	Tennessee	Florida
2005	Tennessee	Tennessee
2006	Florida	Kentucky
2007	Florida	Florida
2008	Florida	Tennessee
2009	Florida	South Carolina
2010	Florida	Florida
2011	South Carolina	Auburn
2012	Florida	Florida
2013	Florida; Texas A&M	Texas A&M
2014	Texas A&M	Texas A&M
2015	Florida	Florida
2016	South Carolina	Florida
2017	South Carolina	Texas A&M
2018	Vanderbilt	LSU
2019	Arkansas	South Carolina
2020–21 (Note: The SEC played a split soccer season in the COVID-affected 2020–21 school year, holding conference competition during the traditional NCAA soccer season in fall 2020 and non-conference games in spring 2021.)	Arkansas; Texas A&M (Note: Arkansas won the West Division title outright, but shared the regular-season title with fellow West Division member Texas A&M.)	Vanderbilt
2021	Arkansas	Tennessee
2022	Alabama	South Carolina
2023	Arkansas	Georgia
2024	Mississippi State	Texas
2025	Arkansas	Vanderbilt
2026	Vanderbilt	South Carolina

=== Other division winners ===
1995 - Alabama (West)
1996 - Arkansas (West)
1997 - Alabama (West)
1998 - Alabama (West)
1999 - Mississippi (West)
2000 - Mississippi (West)
2001 - Mississippi State, Auburn (West)
2002 - Tennessee (East)
2003 - Auburn (West)
2004 - Auburn (West)
2005 - Mississippi (West)
2006 - Auburn (West)
2007 - LSU (West)
2008 - Auburn, LSU (West)
2009 - LSU (West)
2010 - Auburn (West)
2011 - LSU (West)
2012 - Texas A&M (West)
2019 – Vanderbilt (East)
2020–21 – Tennessee (East)

- Divisional winners discontinued from 2013–2018, and after 2020–21.

== Softball ==
All current SEC schools except Vanderbilt play softball.

Softball Summary
School	Last SEC Reg. Season Title	Number of SEC Reg. Season Titles	Last SEC Tourney Title	Number of SEC Tourney Titles
Current members
Florida	2021	9	2024	6
Alabama	2019	6	2021	6
LSU	2004	5	2007	5
Tennessee	2024	3	2023	3
Arkansas	2022	2	2022	1
Georgia	2005	2	2014	1
Oklahoma	2026	2	2025	1
South Carolina	1997	1	2000	2
Auburn	never	0	2016	2
Ole Miss	never	0	2017	1
Texas	never	0	2026	1
Texas A&M	never	0	2025	1
Kentucky	never	0	never	0
Mississippi State	never	0	never	0
Missouri	never	0	never	0
Last team to win regular season & tournament in same year: Oklahoma, 2025

=== Champions ===
Year	Regular-season champion(s)	Tournament champion
1997	South Carolina	South Carolina
1998	Florida	Alabama
1999	LSU	LSU
2000	LSU	South Carolina
2001	LSU	LSU
2002	LSU	LSU
2003	Georgia	Alabama
2004	LSU	LSU
2005	Georgia	Alabama
2006	Alabama	Tennessee
2007	Tennessee	LSU
2008	Florida	Florida
2009	Florida	Florida
2010	Alabama	Alabama
2011	Alabama	Tennessee
2012	Alabama	Alabama
2013	Florida	Florida
2014	Alabama	Georgia
2015	Florida	Auburn
2016	Florida	Auburn
2017	Florida	Ole Miss
2018	Florida	Florida
2019	Alabama	Florida
2020	Season canceled due to COVID-19	
2021	Arkansas; Florida	Alabama
2022	Arkansas	Arkansas
2023	Tennessee	Tennessee
2024	Tennessee	Florida
2025	Oklahoma	Oklahoma; Texas A&M
2026	Oklahoma	Texas

=== Other division winners ===
1997 - LSU (West)
1998 - LSU (West)
1999 - Tennessee, South Carolina (East)
2000 - Kentucky (East)
2001 - South Carolina (East)
2002 - South Carolina (East)
2003 - Alabama (West)
2004 - Tennessee (East)
2005 - Georgia (East)
2006 - Georgia (East)
2007 - LSU (West)
2007 - Alabama (West)
2008 - Alabama (West)
2009 - Alabama (West)
2010 - Florida (East)
2011 - Florida (East)
2012 - Tennessee (East)
2013 - LSU (West)

- Division winners discontinued in 2014

== Swimming and diving ==
10 SEC schools participate in men's swimming and diving, and 12 in women's swimming and diving.

The following schools have both men's and women's teams: Alabama, Auburn, Florida, Georgia, Kentucky, LSU, Missouri, South Carolina, Tennessee Texas, and Texas A&M.

Arkansas and Vanderbilt sponsor the sport for women only. The two Mississippi schools and Oklahoma do not sponsor the sport at all.

Women's Swimming and Diving Summary
School	Last SEC Title	Number of SEC Titles
Current members
Florida	2024	19
Georgia	2015	12
Auburn	2008	5
Texas A&M	2019	4
Tennessee	2022	2
Texas	2026	2
Alabama	1985	1
Kentucky	2021	1
Arkansas	never	0
LSU	never	0
South Carolina	never	0
Vanderbilt	never	0

Men's Swimming and Diving Summary
School	Last SEC Title	Number of SEC Titles
Current members
Florida	2024	45
Auburn	2012	18
Tennessee	1996	10
Georgia	1955	3
Alabama	1987	2
Texas	2026	2
LSU	1988	1
Kentucky	never	0
Missouri	never	0
South Carolina	never	0
Texas A&M	never	0
Former members
Georgia Tech	1950	4

=== Champions ===
Year	Men's Champion	Women's Champion
1937	Florida	
1938	Florida	
1939	Florida	
1940	Florida	
1941	Florida	
1942	Georgia Tech	
1943-1947	No Competition Held	
1948	Georgia Tech	
1949	Georgia Tech	
1950	Georgia Tech	
1951	Georgia	
1952	Georgia	
1953	Florida	
1954	Florida	
1955	Georgia	
1956	Florida	
1957	Florida	
1958	Florida	
1959	Florida	
1960	Florida	
1961	Florida	
1962	Florida	
1963	Florida	
1964	Florida	
1965	Florida	
1966	Florida	
1967	Florida	
1968	Florida	
1969	Tennessee	
1970	Florida	
1971	Florida	
1972	Tennessee	
1973	Tennessee	
1974	Tennessee	
1975	Tennessee	
1976	Tennessee	
1977	Tennessee	
1978	Tennessee	
1979	Florida	
1980	Florida	
1981	Florida	Florida
1982	Alabama	Florida
1983	Florida	Florida
1984	Florida	Florida
1985	Florida	Alabama
1986	Florida	Florida
1987	Alabama	Florida
1988	LSU	Florida
1989	Tennessee	Florida
1990	Florida	Florida
1991	Florida	Florida
1992	Florida	Florida
1993	Florida	Florida
1994	Auburn	Florida
1995	Auburn	Florida
1996	Tennessee	Florida
1997	Auburn	Georgia
1998	Auburn	Georgia
1999	Auburn	Georgia
2000	Auburn	Georgia
2001	Auburn	Georgia
2002	Auburn	Florida
2003	Auburn	Auburn
2004	Auburn	Auburn
2005	Auburn	Auburn
2006	Auburn	Georgia
2007	Auburn	Auburn
2008	Auburn	Auburn
2009	Auburn	Florida
2010	Auburn	Georgia
2011	Auburn	Georgia
2012	Auburn	Georgia
2013	Florida	Georgia
2014	Florida	Georgia
2015	Florida	Georgia
2016	Florida	Texas A&M
2017	Florida	Texas A&M
2018	Florida	Texas A&M
2019	Florida	Texas A&M
2020	Florida	Tennessee
2021	Florida	Kentucky
2022	Florida	Tennessee
2023	Florida	Florida
2024	Florida	Florida
2025	Texas	Texas
2026	Texas	Texas

== Men's tennis ==
All SEC schools play men's tennis except for Missouri. Arkansas had announced that it would drop men's and women's tennis after the 2025–26 season, but less than a month later reinstated both sports without interruption.

From 1953-1989, the SEC Champion was determined by the accumulation of points in an individual flighted tournament (there was not a separate team tournament champion).

In 1990, a team dual match format was instituted for the conference tournament which provided the SEC tournament champion.

From 1990-98, the SEC Champion was determined by a total aggregate points accumulated at the conclusion of the conference tournament: one full point was awarded for each regular-season conference win, one-half point for wins in the first two rounds of the conference tournament, one-half point for receiving a first-round bye in the conference tournament and one full point for a win in the conference tournament semifinals and finals.

For the 1999 season, the same points system was in place with a couple of changes: one full point for first-round bye in the conference tournament and one full point for a win in any round of the conference tournament.

In 2000, the SEC changed the determination of its tennis regular season champion to the team with the best winning percentage in conference regular-season dual matches.

Men's Tennis Summary
School	Last SEC Reg. Season Title	Number of SEC Reg. Season Titles	Last SEC Tournety Title	Number of SEC Tourney Titles
Current members
Georgia	2023	32	2017	10
Florida	2022	12	2022	6
Tennessee	2011	10	2021	4
LSU	1999	5	1999	2
Mississippi	2009	5	2009	3
Kentucky	2024	3	2024	3
Mississippi State	1993	3	2019	3
Texas A&M	2018	3	2015	2
Texas	2026	2	2026	2
Auburn	1984	2	never	0
Alabama	1976	1	never	0
Vanderbilt	never	0	2003	1
Arkansas	never	0	never	0
Oklahoma	never	0	never	0
South Carolina	never	0	never	0
Former members
Tulane	1964	18	N/A	0
Georgia Tech	1960	3	N/A	0
The SEC Champion was determined by accumulation of individual points at the SEC Tournament from 1953-89
Last team to win regular season & tournament in same year: Kentucky, 2024

=== Champions ===
Year	Regular-season champion(s)	Tournament champion(s)
1938		Georgia Tech
1939		Tulane
1940		LSU
1941		Tulane
1942		Tulane
1943-1945		No Competition Held
1946		Georgia Tech
1947		Tulane
1948		Tulane
1949		Tulane
1950		Florida
1951		Tennessee; Tulane
1952		Tulane
1953		Tulane
1954		Tulane
1955		Tulane
1956		Tulane
1957		Tulane
1958		Tulane
1959		Tulane
1960		Georgia Tech
1961		Florida
1962		Tulane
1963		Tulane
1964		Tulane
1965		Mississippi State
1966		Tennessee
1967		Mississippi State
1968		Florida
1969		Florida
1970		Tennessee
1971		Georgia
1972		Georgia
1973		Georgia
1974		Georgia
1975		Florida; Georgia
1976		Alabama; LSU
1977		Georgia
1978		Georgia
1979		Georgia
1980		Tennessee
1981		Georgia
1982		Georgia
1983		Auburn
1984		Auburn
1985		Georgia; LSU
1986		Tennessee
1987		Georgia
1988		Georgia
1989		Georgia
1990	Tennessee	Tennessee
1991	Georgia	Georgia
1992	Kentucky	Kentucky
1993	Georgia; Mississippi State	Georgia
1994	Florida	Florida
1995	Georgia	Georgia
1996	Georgia; Ole Miss	Mississippi State
1997	Georgia; Ole Miss	Ole Miss
1998	LSU	LSU
1999	Georgia; LSU	LSU
2000	Florida; Tennessee	Florida
2001	Georgia	Georgia
2002	Georgia	Tennessee
2003	Florida	Vanderbilt
2004	Ole Miss	Georgia
2005	Florida; Ole Miss	Florida
2006	Georgia	Georgia
2007	Georgia	Georgia
2008	Georgia	Ole Miss
2009	Ole Miss	Ole Miss
2010	Tennessee	Tennessee
2011	Georgia; Tennessee	Florida
2012	Kentucky	Georgia
2013	Georgia	Georgia
2014	Georgia	Texas A&M
2015	Georgia; Texas A&M	Texas A&M
2016	Georgia	Florida
2017	Georgia; Texas A&M	Georgia
2018	Texas A&M	Mississippi State
2019	Florida	Mississippi State
2020	Season canceled due to COVID-19	
2021	Florida	Tennessee
2022	Florida	Florida
2023	Georgia	Kentucky
2024	Kentucky	Kentucky
2025	Texas	Texas
2026	Texas	Texas

=== Other division winners ===
2002 - Ole Miss (West)
2003 - Ole Miss (West)
2004 - Florida (East)
2005 - Florida (East), Ole Miss (West)
2006 - Ole Miss (West)
2007 - Ole Miss (West)
2008 - Ole Miss (West)
2009 - Georgia (East)
2010 - Ole Miss (West)
2011 - Mississippi State (West)
2012 - Mississippi State (West)
2013 - Texas A&M, Ole Miss (West)

- Divisional winners discontinued in 2014

== Women's tennis ==
All current SEC schools play women's tennis. Arkansas initially dropped men's and women's tennis after the 2025–26 season, but reinstated both programs without interruption.

In 2000, the SEC changed the determination of its tennis champions to the team with the best winning percentage in conference regular-season dual matches (11 matches). Before this, a points system was used in which full- or half-points were awarded for wins during the season as well as during the conference tournament.

Women's Tennis Summary
School	Last SEC Reg. Season Title	Number of SEC Reg. Season Titles	Last SEC Tourney Title	Number of SEC Tourney Titles
Current members
Florida	2016	30	2016	19
Georgia	2024	12	2025	11
Texas A&M	2026	6	2022	1
Vanderbilt	2018	2	2018	3
Auburn	2026	1	2026	1
Alabama	2014	1	never	0
Kentucky	2005	1	never	0
Oklahoma	2026	1	never	0
Ole Miss	never	0	1999	1
South Carolina	never	0	2019	1
Arkansas	never	0	never	0
LSU	never	0	never	0
Mississippi State	never	0	never	0
Missouri	never	0	never	0
Tennessee	never	0	never	0
Texas	never	0	never	0
The SEC Champion was determined by the accumulation of individual points in the SEC Tournament from 1980-81 and 1984-1989. In 1982-1983, the SEC Champion was determined from dual match play in the SEC tournament From 1990-1999, the SEC Champion was determined by accumulated points in dual matches during the regular season and in the SEC Tournament
Last team to win regular season & tournament in same year: Georgia, 2024

=== Champions ===
Year	Regular-season champion(s)	Tournament champion(s)
1980		Florida
1981		Florida
1982		Florida
1983		Georgia
1984		Florida
1985		Florida
1986		Florida
1987		Florida
1988		Florida
1989		Georgia
1990	Florida; Georgia	Florida
1991	Florida	Florida
1992	Florida	Florida
1993	Florida	Florida
1994	Georgia	Georgia
1995	Florida	Florida
1996	Florida	Florida
1997	Florida	Florida
1998	Florida	Florida
1999	Florida	Ole Miss
2000	Georgia	Florida
2001	Florida	Georgia
2002	Georgia	Florida
2003	Florida	Florida
2004	Florida	Florida
2005	Kentucky	Florida
2006	Florida	Florida
2007	Florida; Georgia	Georgia
2008	Florida	Georgia
2009	Georgia	Georgia
2010	Florida	Florida
2011	Florida	Florida
2012	Florida	Florida
2013	Florida; Georgia; Texas A&M	Florida
2014	Alabama	Georgia
2015	Florida	Vanderbilt
2016	Florida	Florida
2017	Vanderbilt	Vanderbilt
2018	Vanderbilt	Vanderbilt
2019	Georgia	South Carolina
2020	Season canceled due to COVID-19	
2021	Georgia	Georgia
2022	Texas A&M	Texas A&M
2023	Texas A&M	Georgia
2024	Georgia; Texas A&M	Georgia
2025	Texas A&M	Georgia
2026	Auburn; Oklahoma; Texas A&M	Auburn

=== Other division winners ===
2002 - Auburn (West)
2003 - Alabama (West)
2004 - LSU (West)
2005 - Mississippi State, Ole Miss (West)
2006 - Alabama (West)
2007 - LSU, Auburn (West)
2008 - Arkansas (West)
2009 - Arkansas (West)
2010 - Ole Miss (West)
2011 - Alabama (West)
2012 - Alabama (West)
2013 - Florida, Georgia (East), Texas A&M (West)

- Divisional winners discontinued in 2014

== Volleyball ==
All SEC members currently play women's volleyball. Vanderbilt reinstated women's volleyball in 2025 after an absence of more than 45 years; it played in the first SEC tournament in 1979, but dropped the sport after that season. The SEC does not currently sponsor men's volleyball, and no conference member has a varsity men's team.

The SEC Volleyball Tournament was suspended for three seasons after the 2005 season. It was not renewed, but, with the NCAA on the verge of officially adding beach volleyball (then called "sand volleyball") to its Emerging Sports program, the conference's coaches instead sponsored a Commissioner's Cup tournament for that variation of the sport. The tournaments, which were held in mid-April between 2008–10, were won by Georgia, South Carolina, and LSU respectively.

On March 14, 2023, the SEC announced that the women's volleyball tournament would be reinstated in the near future. At the time, the conference had not decided whether the tournament would resume in 2024 (when Oklahoma and Texas joined) or 2025 (when Vanderbilt reinstated women's volleyball). In September 2024, the SEC announced that the tournament would resume in 2025.

Volleyball Summary
School	Last SEC Reg. Season Title	Number of SEC Reg. Season Titles	Last SEC Tourney Title	Number of SEC Tourney Titles
Current members
Florida	2026	26	2005	12
Kentucky	2025	12	2025	6
LSU	2009	5	1991	4
Tennessee	2011	4	2004	4
Georgia	1986	2	1985	1
Missouri	2016	2	never	0
Texas A&M	2015	1	never	0
Arkansas	never	0	1997	1
Alabama	never	0	never	0
Auburn	never	0	never	0
Mississippi State	never	0	never	0
Oklahoma	never	0	never	0
Ole Miss	never	0	never	0
South Carolina	never	0	never	0
Texas	never	0	never	0
Vanderbilt	never	0	never	0
The SEC Tournament determined the overall SEC Champion from 1979-85. It was discontinued after the 2005 season, not resuming until 2025.
Last team to win regular season & tournament in same year: Kentucky, 2025

=== Champions ===
Year	Regular-season champion(s)	Tournament champion
1979	Not awarded	Kentucky
1980	Not awarded	Kentucky
1981	Not awarded	Tennessee
1982	Tennessee	Tennessee
1983	Kentucky	Kentucky
1984	Tennessee	Tennessee
1985	Georgia	Georgia
1986	Georgia; LSU	LSU
1987	Kentucky	Kentucky
1988	Kentucky	Kentucky
1989	LSU	LSU
1990	LSU	LSU
1991	Florida; LSU	LSU
1992	Florida	Florida
1993	Florida	Florida
1994	Florida	Florida
1995	Florida	Florida
1996	Florida	Florida
1997	Florida	Arkansas
1998	Florida	Florida
1999	Florida	Florida
2000	Florida	Florida
2001	Florida	Florida
2002	Florida	Florida
2003	Florida	Florida
2004	Florida; Tennessee	Tennessee
2005	Florida	Florida
2006	Florida	No Tournament
2007	Florida	No Tournament
2008	Florida	No Tournament
2009	LSU	No Tournament
2010	Florida	No Tournament
2011	Tennessee	No Tournament
2012	Florida	No Tournament
2013	Missouri	No Tournament
2014	Florida	No Tournament
2015	Texas A&M	No Tournament
2016	Florida; Missouri	No Tournament
2017	Florida; Kentucky	No Tournament
2018	Kentucky	No Tournament
2019	Florida; Kentucky	No Tournament
2020*	Kentucky	No Tournament
2021*	Kentucky	No Tournament
2022	Florida; Kentucky	No Tournament
2023	Kentucky	No Tournament
2024	Kentucky	No Tournament
2025	Kentucky	Kentucky
2026	Florida	TBD

- The 2020 season was split into fall and spring phases due to COVID-19.
- From 1979–1982 regular-season conference standings were not tabulated.

=== Other division winners ===
1995 - Arkansas (West)
1996 - Arkansas (West)
1997 - Arkansas (West)
1998 - Arkansas (West)
1999 - Arkansas (West)
2000 - Alabama (West)
2001 - Arkansas (West)
2002 - Arkansas (West)
2003 - Arkansas (West)
2004 - Arkansas, Alabama (West)
2005 - LSU, Arkansas (West)
2006 - LSU (West)
2007 - LSU (West)
2008 - LSU (West)
2009 - Kentucky (East)
2010 - LSU (West)
2011 - LSU (West)
2012 - Texas A&M (West)

- Divisional winners discontinued in 2013
