= Sunisa Lee =

American artistic gymnast (born 2003)

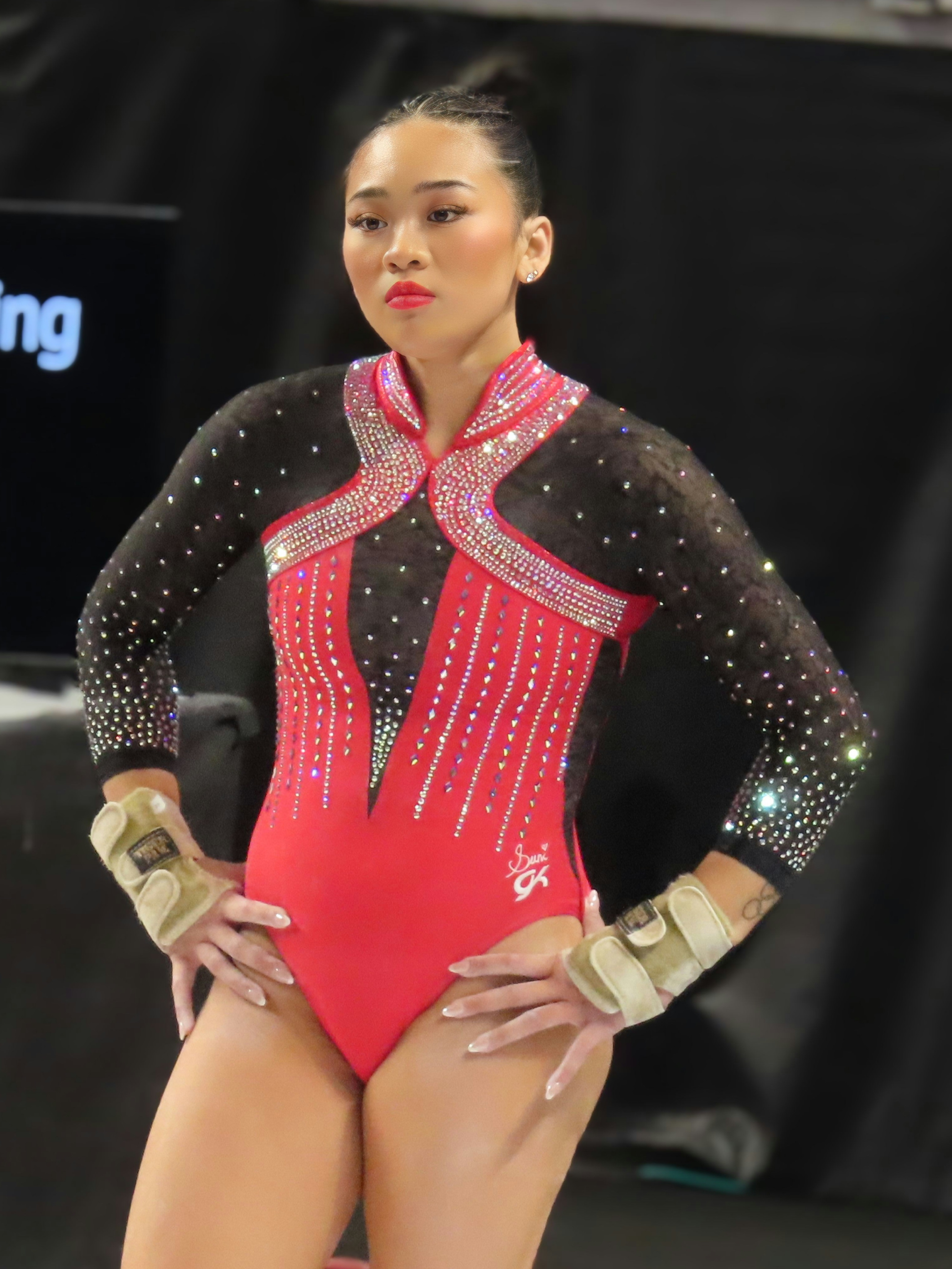
- Lee at the 2024 U.S Gymnastics Championships

Personal information
- Full name: Sunisa Phabsomphou Lee
- Nickname: Suni
- Born: March 9, 2003 (age 23) Saint Paul, Minnesota, U.S.
- Height: 5 ft 0 in (152 cm)

Gymnastics career
- Discipline: Women's artistic gymnastics
- Country represented: United States; (2016–2021, 2024)
- College team: Auburn Tigers (2022–2023)
- Training location: Little Canada, Minnesota, U.S.
- Club: Midwest Gymnastics Center
- Head coach: Jess Graba
- Assistant coach: Alison Lim
Medal record
Event	1st	2nd	3rd
Olympic Games	2	1	3
World Championships	1	1	1
NCAA Championships	1	1	0
Total	4	3	4
Women's artistic gymnastics
Representing the United States
Olympic Games
Gold medal – first place	2020 Tokyo	All-Around
Gold medal – first place	2024 Paris	Team
Silver medal – second place	2020 Tokyo	Team
Bronze medal – third place	2020 Tokyo	Uneven Bars
Bronze medal – third place	2024 Paris	All-Around
Bronze medal – third place	2024 Paris	Uneven Bars
World Championships
Gold medal – first place	2019 Stuttgart	Team
Silver medal – second place	2019 Stuttgart	Floor Exercise
Bronze medal – third place	2019 Stuttgart	Uneven Bars
Representing the Auburn Tigers
NCAA Championships
Gold medal – first place	2022 Fort Worth	Balance Beam
Silver medal – second place	2022 Fort Worth	All-Around
- Awards: See awards

Sunisa "Suni" Phabsomphou Lee (Note: /suːˈniːsə/ soo-NEE-sə; /ˈsuːni/ SOO-nee; born Sunisa Phabsomphou) (born March 9, 2003) is an American artistic gymnast. She is the 2020 Olympic all-around gold medalist and uneven bars bronze medalist and the 2024 Olympic all-around and uneven bars bronze medalist. She was the 2019 World Championship silver medalist on the floor and bronze medalist on uneven bars. Lee was a part of the "Golden Girls" that won gold at the 2024 Summer Olympics. She was also a member of the teams that won gold at the 2019 World Championships and silver at the 2020 Summer Olympics. She is also a two-time U.S. national champion on the uneven bars. In NCAA Gymnastics, she competed for the Auburn Tigers gymnastics team, winning a SEC title on uneven bars and an NCAA championship on balance beam. She is the third female gymnast to win NCAA, World, and Olympic championship titles, after Kyla Ross and Madison Kocian.

Lee is the first Hmong-American Olympian. She is also reported to be the first woman of Hmong descent and first Asian American woman to win the Olympic all-around title. She is a six-time member of the U.S. women's national gymnastics team, and with nine world championship and Olympic medals, she is the seventh-most-decorated American female gymnast.

Lee has received numerous honors and awards. In 2021, she was named Female Athlete of the Year by Sports Illustrated, named Sportswoman of the Year by the Women's Sports Foundation, and included in Time 100, Time's annual list of the 100 most influential people in the world. She also received an Asia Game Changer Award. She has won the Best Comeback Athlete ESPY Award at the 2025 ESPY Awards.

== Early life and family ==
Lee was born Sunisa Phabsomphou on March 9, 2003, in Saint Paul, Minnesota, to Yeev Thoj, a healthcare worker. Lee is of Hmong descent, and her mother, a refugee, immigrated to the United States from Laos as a child. Lee was raised by her mother's longtime partner, John Lee, from the age of two and considers him to be her father. She began using his surname professionally as a teenager. Lee has three half-siblings through her mother's relationship with Lee, and Lee had two children from a previous relationship. Her sister Evionn also competed in artistic gymnastics at the regional level.

Lee's interest in gymnastics was piqued at age six after watching Nastia Liukin and Shawn Johnson on YouTube, and her father built a balance beam for her from a mattress. When Lee started doing backflips outdoors, it became clear to her parents that she needed a safer venue to hone her skills. They registered her for gymnastics classes at Midwest Gymnastics Center in Little Canada, Minnesota, where she started training under coach Punnarith Koy. The following year, Lee won the all-around at a state meet, the second competition of her career. At age eight, she moved up three levels, and she qualified for elite at age 11. Koy coached Lee from age six to about 12, when she switched to Jess Graba, who has coached her ever since.

== Gymnastics career ==
=== Junior career ===
==== 2015–2018 ====
Lee competed in the Hopes division in 2015, became a junior elite in 2016, and made her junior elite debut at the 2016 U.S. Classic. (Note: The Elite Program consists of regional and national training programs and competitions designed for athletes aspiring to represent the United States in international competition. Athletes participate at Developmental, Open, Pre-Elite, and National Team training camps. Only athletes at the National Team level are called "elite gymnasts". There are two Elite groups: Junior Elite (ages 11–15) and Senior Elite (ages 16+). The Hopes division is a pre-elite program.) She earned a spot on the junior national team in 2017 and debuted internationally at the Gymnix International Junior Cup where the U.S. team won the gold medal in the team event. Lee captured the silver on uneven bars. In May 2017, Lee announced her verbal commitment to Auburn University on a gymnastics scholarship.

Lee was named to the team to compete at the 2018 Pacific Rim Gymnastics Championships, which took place in April 2018. She won gold with the U.S. team in the team final. She also secured the silver medal on vault, balance beam, and in the floor exercise. She placed 4th in the all-around. A month later, she withdrew from the Pan American Junior Championships in Buenos Aires, Argentina, after sustaining an ankle injury.

In July 2018, Lee competed at the 2018 U.S. Classic where she finished fifth in the all-around and won the gold medal on balance beam despite not doing a dismount. She was one of the favorites for the national junior title along with Leanne Wong, Jordan Bowers, and Kayla DiCello heading into the 2018 U.S. Championships in Boston. She came third in the all-around behind Wong and DiCello. She won gold on the uneven bars.

=== Senior career ===
==== 2019 ====
Lee made her international senior debut at the 2019 City of Jesolo Trophy in Italy where she won the all-around title and took home the gold with the U.S. team in the team final. In the event finals, she placed first on the uneven bars and on floor, and third on the balance beam behind reigning world champion Liu Tingting of China and teammate Emma Malabuyo.

Lee won the silver on beam at the 2019 American Classic in June and finished fifth on bars after falling off twice. After the conclusion of the event, Lee was among the eight athletes under consideration for the team to be fielded at the 2019 Pan American Games, but would have to compete at the 2019 U.S. Classic to secure her place. In the end, Lee was not named to the team after placing second on bars and tying for eighth on beam at U.S. Classic.

It was a year plagued by injuries. Lee injured her ankle and sustained a hairline fracture to her left tibia after a dismount from the balance beam. She was still recovering from her injuries by the time the 2019 U.S. Championships rolled around in August. Still, Lee competed on all four events, and after the first day of competition, she was in second place in the all-around behind Simone Biles and in first place on uneven bars. On the second day of competition, she continued to perform clean routines and finished second in the all-around behind Biles. She won gold on bars ahead of Morgan Hurd and placed fourth on beam behind Biles, Kara Eaker, and Leanne Wong. She also won the bronze on floor behind Biles and Jade Carey. As a result, she was named to the national team. A month later at the world team selection camp, Lee finished second by 0.350 points in the all-around behind Biles. The next day, Lee was chosen to represent the U.S. at the 2019 World Championships in Stuttgart alongside Biles, Kara Eaker, MyKayla Skinner, Jade Carey, and Grace McCallum. Lee was the only first-year senior named to the team and the only team member without prior World Championships experience.

Lee competed in her first world championships in October 2019. The U.S. took first at team qualifications with a score of 174.205, more than five points ahead of China in second with 169.161. Lee advanced to the individual all-around final in second place after Biles despite a fall on the balance beam. She also qualified second behind Biles to the floor exercise final, beating out teammate Carey in a tiebreaker, and to the uneven bars final in third place behind reigning World Champion Nina Derwael of Belgium and 2015 World Champion Daria Spiridonova of Russia. Lee competed on uneven bars, balance beam, and floor and helped the U.S. to gold in the team final ahead of Russia and Italy. She had another fall on the beam, but her scores on bars (14.733) and floor exercise (14.233) were the third highest of the day on the two events. She finished in eighth place in the all-around final after an uncharacteristic mistake on the uneven bars. Two days later, in the uneven bars final, Lee performed a clean routine and posted a score of 14.800. She won the bronze medal behind Derwael and Becky Downie. She also won the silver in the floor exercise final behind Biles.

==== 2020 ====
In late January, it was announced that Lee would compete at the Stuttgart World Cup scheduled to take place in March, but the event was canceled as a result of the COVID-19 pandemic. Lee's gym closed temporarily for three weeks as part of the pandemic response and when she returned, she broke a bone in her left foot which left her out of action for two months. An injury to her Achilles tendon sidelined her for another two months. In November, Lee committed to Auburn University and signed her National Letter of Intent.

==== 2021 ====
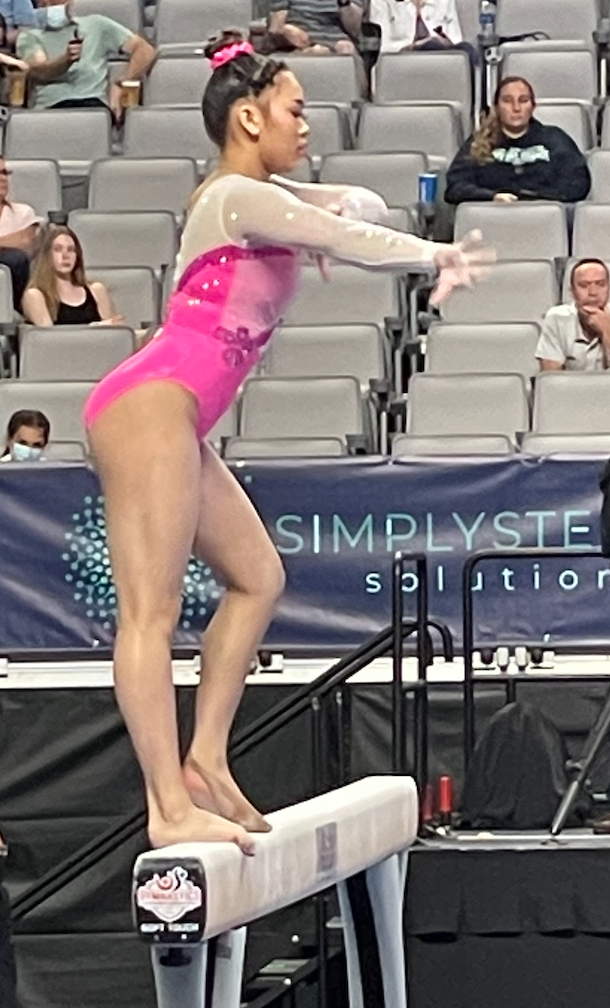
Lee at the 2021 US National Championships

Lee returned to competition in February at the 2021 Winter Cup, where she competed on uneven bars and balance beam. She placed first on bars and third on beam behind Skye Blakely and Jordan Chiles, despite doing a relatively low-scoring dismount. She went on to compete at the 2021 American Classic in April. She placed first on bars and beam with scores of 15.200 and 14.550, and finished fifth on floor even though she opted to simplify two tumbling passes. A month later, in May, Lee competed at the 2021 U.S. Classic on the uneven bars and balance beam. She fell off both apparatus and placed tenth and eighth respectively.

The 2021 U.S. Championships took place in early June. Lee executed a bars routine with a 6.8 difficulty value, scoring 15.300. She went on to win the silver in the all-around behind Simone Biles. She placed first on the uneven bars, second on the balance beam, and qualified for the upcoming U.S. Olympic Gymnastics Trials. A few weeks later, Lee competed on all four events at the two-day Olympic Trials. She achieved an uneven bars score of 15.300 on day one and found herself in second place in the all-around behind Biles. On day two, she earned a combined score of 58.166 and beat Biles' 57.533. This was only the third time in Biles' senior career and the first time since 2013 that another gymnast had posted a higher all-around score. However, Lee's combined score over the two days was less than Biles' and she finished second overall, securing her spot on the 2020 U.S. Olympic team alongside Biles. Also named to the team were Jordan Chiles and Grace McCallum.

===== 2020 Olympic Games =====
The COVID-19 pandemic delayed the 2020 Olympic Games in Tokyo from the summer of 2020 to July 23-August 8, 2021. Lee competed on all four events during qualifications; the U.S. advanced to the team final in second place behind the Russian Olympic Committee. Lee finished third overall behind Simone Biles and Rebeca Andrade and qualified for the individual all-around final. She progressed to the uneven bars final in second place behind Nina Derwael and the balance beam final in third behind Guan Chenchen and Tang Xijing.

Lee was initially to compete only on uneven bars and balance beam in the team final, but when Biles withdrew from the competition after the first rotation, Lee replaced her on floor exercise. She hit all three of her routines and scored 15.400 on bars and 14.133 on beam. The U.S. won the silver medal behind the Russian Olympic Committee. In the all-around final, Lee posted a score of 14.600 on the vault, 15.300 on the uneven bars, 13.833 on beam and 13.700 on floor, leading all competitors with a 57.433 total overall. She won the women's individual all-around gold ahead of Brazil's Rebeca Andrade and Angelina Melnikova of the Russian Olympic Committee. Lee is the sixth U.S. woman to claim the Olympic all-around title following Mary Lou Retton, Carly Patterson, Nastia Liukin, Gabby Douglas, and Simone Biles. She is also the first Hmong-American Olympian, the first Asian American woman to take the Olympic all-around crown, and was reported to be the first all-around Asian champion of any nationality. Lee was the first competitor in the starting order in the uneven bars final and uncharacteristically failed to connect several elements. She scored 14.500 and captured the bronze. She received a score of 13.866 in the balance beam final and placed fifth after a large balance check on one of her elements.

In recognition of her historic Olympic success, the governor of Minnesota, Tim Walz, and the mayor of St. Paul, Melvin Carter, declared Friday, July 30, 2021, as "Sunisa Lee Day". Lee registered for classes at Auburn University in August 2021 and left elite gymnastics to compete in the NCAA.

=== NCAA ===
==== 2021–2022 season ====
Lee made her NCAA debut on January 7, 2022, in a tri-meet against North Carolina and Bowling Green. She competed on uneven bars and balance beam to help Auburn secure the win. A week later, Lee debuted her floor exercise routine in a meet against Arkansas. She made her all-around debut for Auburn on January 28 in a matchup with Alabama. Auburn won the meet with Lee winning the all-around title outright with a total score of 39.700. She shared the individual bars and beam titles. As a result, Lee was named SEC freshman of the week for the first time. On February 5, Lee earned her first collegiate perfect ten on the uneven bars in a meet against LSU. She was only the sixth Auburn gymnast to score a perfect ten and the first since 2004. Lee also won the all-around with a score of 39.825. On February 25, in a meet against Kentucky, Lee earned her first perfect ten on the balance beam and became the first collegiate gymnast to perform a Nabieva on the uneven bars. At the NCAA Championship, Lee finished first on balance beam and second in the all-around behind Trinity Thomas.

==== 2022–2023 season ====
On November 15, 2022, Lee announced that the 2022–2023 season would be her final season competing for Auburn University so that she could return to elite gymnastics with the goal of competing at the 2024 Olympic Games in Paris. Lee's first meet of the season was at the inaugural Super 16 event in Las Vegas where she won the balance beam title with a perfect 10 and the all-around title with a cumulative score of 39.75.

In March 2023 Lee was diagnosed with an unspecified rare kidney disease. On April 3 Lee announced that she would end her sophomore season early due to her health issues, thus concluding her NCAA gymnastics career.

==== Career perfect 10.0 ====
Season	Date	Event	Meet
2022	February 5, 2022	Uneven Bars	Auburn @ LSU
2022	February 25, 2022	Balance Beam	Auburn vs Kentucky
2022	March 4, 2022	Balance Beam	Auburn vs Florida
2022	March 19, 2022	Uneven Bars	SEC Championships
2022	April 2, 2022	Balance Beam	Auburn Regional Final
2023	January 7, 2023	Balance Beam	Super 16 Invitational
2023	February 3, 2023	Uneven Bars	Auburn @ Alabama
2023	February 3, 2023	Balance Beam	Auburn @ Alabama
2023	February 10, 2023	Uneven Bars	Auburn vs LSU

==== NCAA Regular season ranking ====
Season	All-Around	Vault	Uneven Bars	Balance Beam	Floor Exercise
2022	2nd	34th	1st	1st	9th
2023	9th	30th	1st	30th	127th

=== Return to elite gymnastics ===
==== 2023 ====
In early August 2023, she made her comeback to elite gymnastics at the 2023 U.S. Classic, where she qualified for the U.S. Championships by scoring 14.500 on the balance beam and 13.500 on the vault. A few weeks later, Lee competed on the vault and balance beam at the 2023 U.S. Championships in San Jose and won the bronze on the beam.

Lee was invited to attend the team selection camp for the World Championships and Pan American Games but chose not to participate, citing her kidney-related health issues.

==== 2024 ====
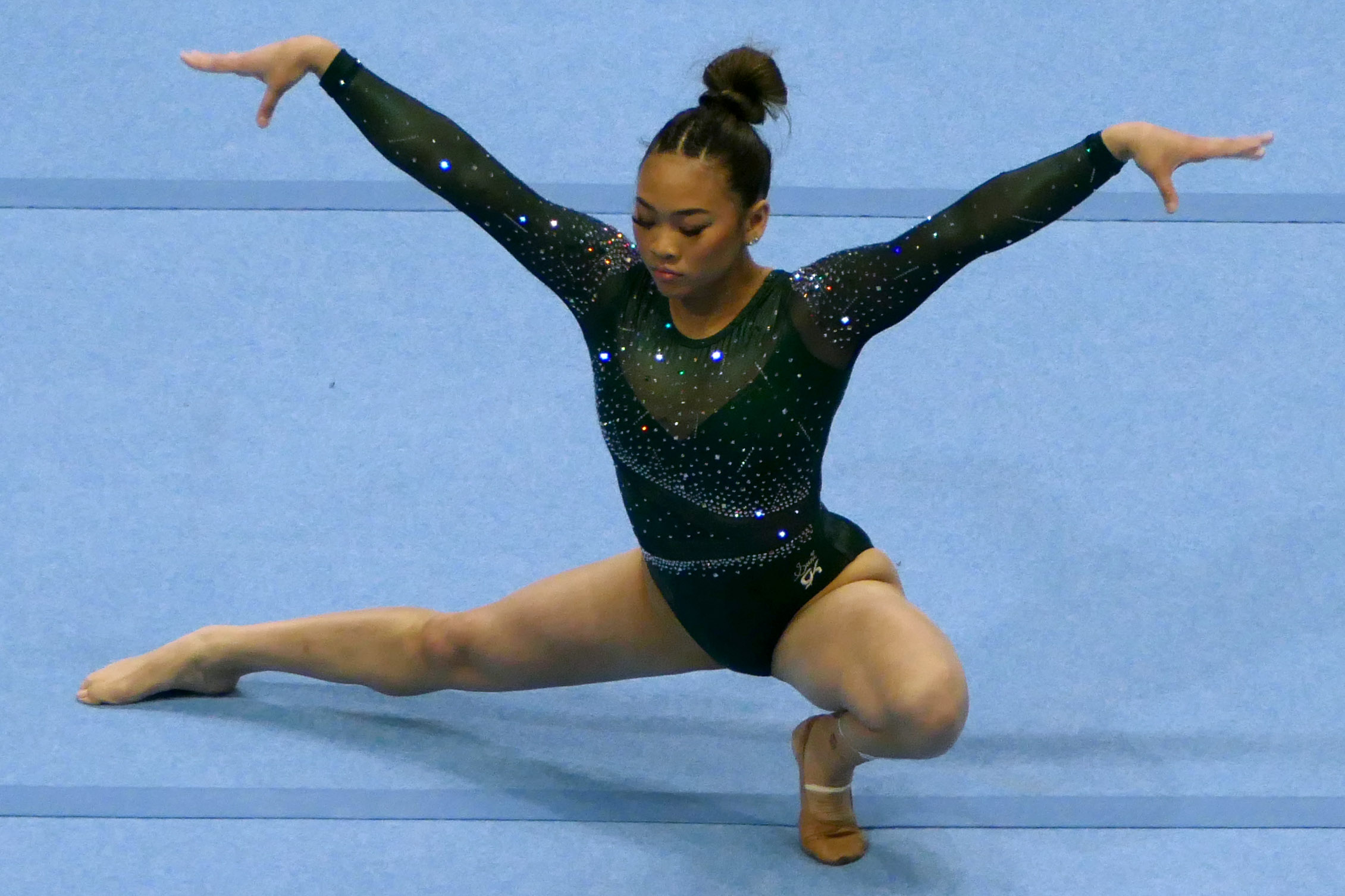
Lee competing on floor at the 2024 Core Hydration Classic

Lee began the 2024 season competing at the 2024 Winter Cup where she had rough performances on the uneven bars and balance beam. She next competed at the American Classic where she placed first on balance beam. At the Core Hydration Classic, Lee competed on floor exercise for the first time since the Tokyo Olympic Games, and placed first on balance beam. At the Xfinity US Gymnastics Championships, she competed with downgraded routines and a fall on vault, but finished fourth all-around and won a silver medal on beam. She was named to the U.S. National Team and invited to compete at the Olympic trials.

At the Olympic trials, Lee placed second in the all-around, first on uneven bars, fifth on balance beam, and seventh on floor exercise. As a result she was selected to represent the United States at the 2024 Summer Olympics alongside Simone Biles, Jade Carey, Jordan Chiles, and Hezly Rivera.

===== 2024 Olympic Games =====
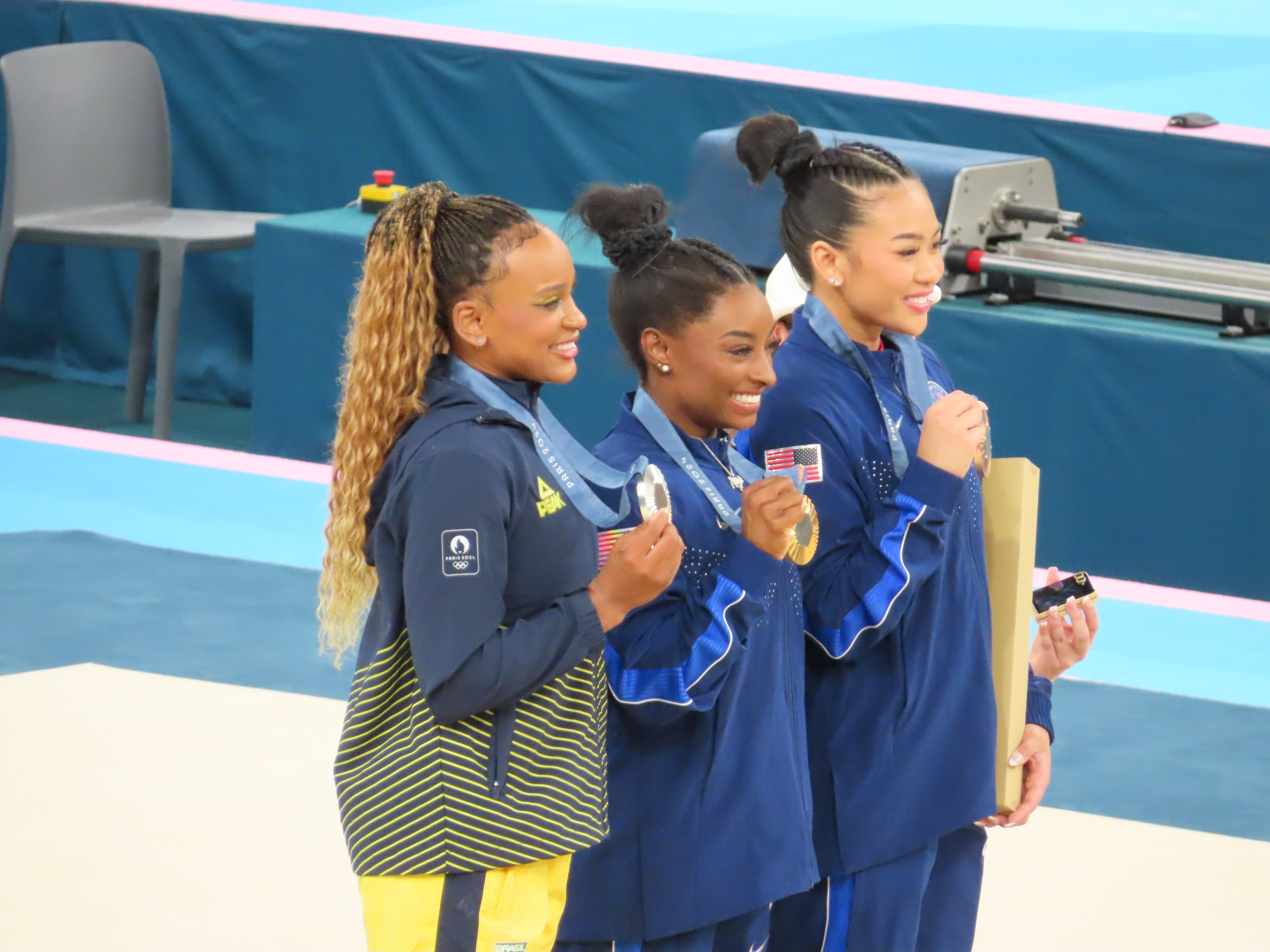
Lee winning bronze in the all-around at the 2024 Olympics

During the qualification round at the Olympics, Lee competed on all four apparatuses. She ended the day ranked third overall and qualified for the all-around final. She also qualified for the uneven bars and balance beam finals. During the team final, Lee contributed scores on uneven bars, balance beam, and floor exercise towards the team's first-place finish, earning the U.S. national team their fourth overall Olympic team gold medal. In the all-around final, Lee won a bronze medal, becoming the first reigning Olympic champion since Nadia Comăneci in 1980 to medal in the event at the following Olympic Games. In the uneven bars final, she finished with a score of 14.800 to win the bronze medal. In the balance beam final, she fell off the beam, scoring a 13.100 and finishing in sixth place.

==== 2025–2026 ====
Following her 2024 Olympic medal victory, Lee's grand uncle, Seexeng Lee, created a 20-pound bronze bust sculpture of her and it was installed in Phalen Regional Park in St. Paul. The sculpture was stolen in July 2025 and recovered by St. Paul police in August 2026.

Lee did not compete in 2025. On July 14, 2026, exactly two years before the 2028 Summer Olympics opening ceremony, she posted a video on her Instagram announcing that she had resumed training, hinting at a possible run for the 2028 Summer Olympics. Her video closed with the quote "This is more than a comeback. Stay tuned." Later that same day, Fanatics Studios announced that they had greenlit a documentary following Lee and chronicling "an intimate look into the life of [Lee] on and off the mat as she opens up her life to the cameras, giving unprecedented access into her comeback to gymnastics".

== Public image and popular culture ==
=== Sponsorship deals ===
In 2021, Lee hired Smith & Saint as her agent. In 2022, Axios called her one of the most marketable NCAA athletes.

Lee has been hired as an endorser for Marriott, L'Oreal, Invisalign, Amazon, Gatorade, Target, Tatcha and CLIF Bar; by American apparel and lifestyle brand Free People in October 2021, and by American footwear company Crocs in March 2023, She appeared in an ad for Sony's Final Fantasy 16 in June 2023. She was hired in 2023 by The LEGO Group, which featured her in its "Play Unstoppable" campaign alongside soccer star Megan Rapinoe, journalist and author Elaine Welteroth, and other inspiring women.

In May 2024, Lee promoted products from dry shampoo company Batiste Hair on her social media. She was hired as the face of the "Americana" collaboration between LoveShackFancy and Cotton Incorporated, by fashion nail company KISS, and by Kim Kardashian's SKIMS for their Team USA limited edition collection in June 2024 ahead of the 2024 Paris Olympics. Lee was hired by American-Canadian athletic apparel retailer Lululemon in October 2024, In November 2024, Sports Illustrated announced she would appear in the 2025 Sports Illustrated Swimsuit edition; which the magazine said was part of its effort to celebrate powerful female athletes who challenge stereotypes and inspire young girls. Lee was hired by sportswear company Hoka in January 2025. In June 2025, Lee was tapped to front the launch of Luxury Japanese Skincare brand Tatcha's Dewy Milk Moisturizer.

=== Fashion ===
Lee designed a signature collection of leotards for GK Elite in 2021. In January 2022, Lee launched her first capsule collection with British fashion retailer PrettyLittleThing. She said, "I love fashion so much and when I'm not in my leotard, I love putting looks together. Being an athlete, I live in athleisure, so I wanted to design clothes that were a bit more fashion-forward".

In October 2025, Lee and WNBA All-Star Angel Reese walked in the 2025 edition of the Victoria's Secret Fashion Show, the first major athletes to model at the brand's signature event.

=== Television and media appearances ===
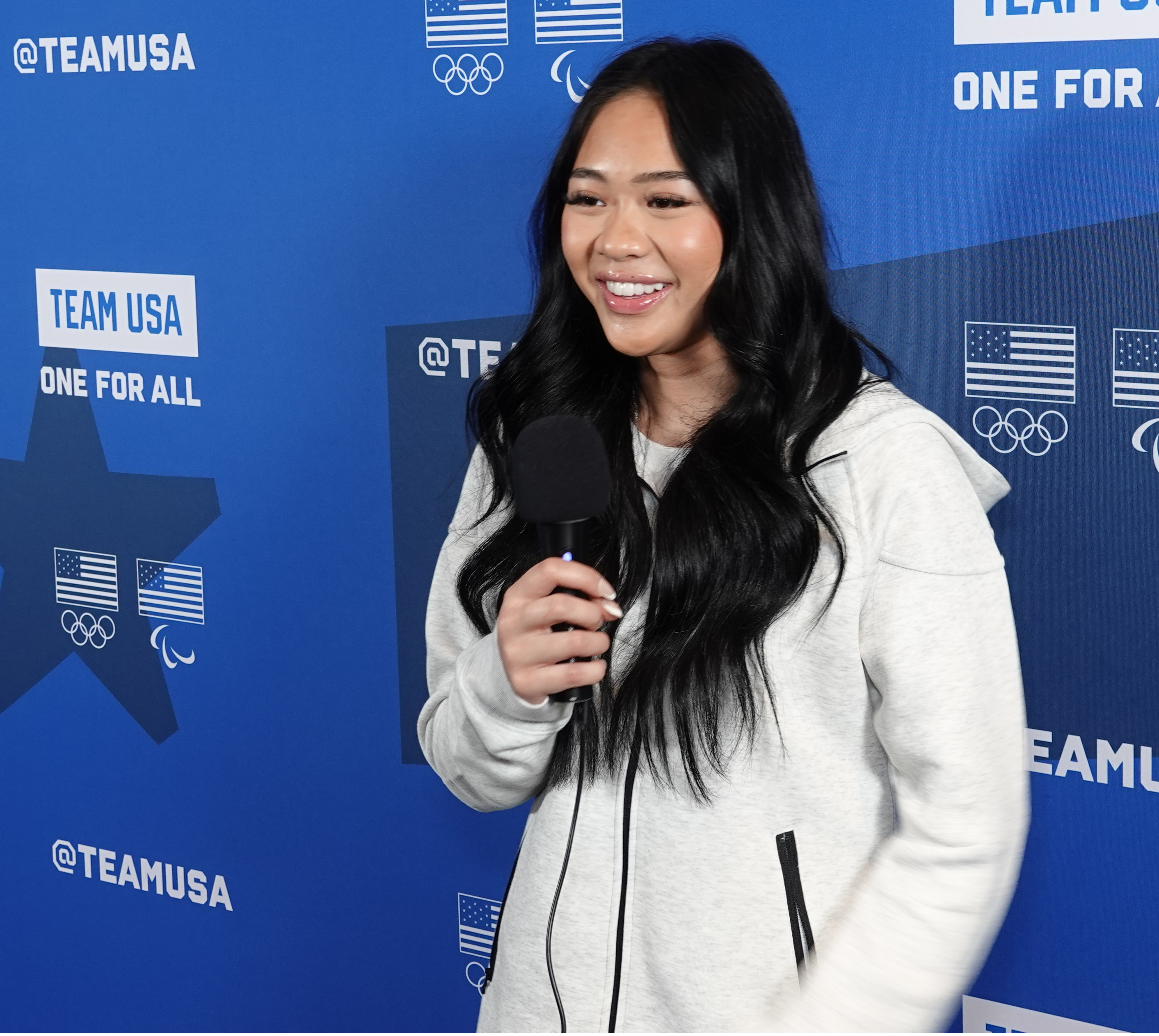
Lee talks to reporters in April 2024 ahead of the 2024 Summer Olympics.

Lee was featured in the six-episode YouTube Originals documentary series Defying Gravity: The Untold Story of Women's Gymnastics. Premiered on September 21, 2020, the series uses archive footage and interviews with former and current champions and up-and-coming gymnasts to take viewers inside the world of women's elite gymnasts. In June 2021, Lee starred in the Peacock docuseries Golden: The Journey of USA's Elite Gymnasts, which followed top U.S. gymnasts as they compete for a spot on Team USA ahead of the 2020 Olympics in Tokyo. In April 2026, Lee made an appearance as a fictionalized version of herself on an episode of Beef.

==== Dancing with the Stars ====
A few months after the 2020 Olympics, Lee competed on season 30 of Dancing with the Stars. She was the seventh Olympic gymnast to be a contestant on the show, following Shawn Johnson, Nastia Liukin, Aly Raisman, Laurie Hernandez, Simone Biles, and Mary Lou Retton. In the premiere episode, Sasha Farber was revealed as her partner. Farber had previously danced with Biles and Retton. Lee was eliminated in week 9 and finished in 5th place.

Week #	Dance / song	Judges' score				Result
Week #	Dance / song	Inaba	Goodman	Hough	Tonioli	Result
1	Jive / "Stay"	7	7	7	7	No Elimination
2	Cha-cha-cha / "I Like It"	7	7	7	7	Safe
3	Foxtrot / "I'm a Slave 4 U"	7	7	7	7	Safe
4	Salsa / "Colombia, Mi Encanto"	8	8	9	8	Safe
4	Viennese waltz / "I Put a Spell on You"	9	8	9	9	Safe
5	Charleston / "Born to Hand Jive"	9	9	9	9	Safe
6	Tango / "Bad Habits"	9	9	9	9	Bottom two
7	Paso doble / "We Will Rock You"	8	8	8	9	Safe
7	Viennese waltz relay / "We Are the Champions"	+1	–	–	–	Safe
8	Samba / "All for You"	10	10	10	10	Safe
8	Salsa / "Made for Now (Latin version)"	Awarded 2 points				Safe
9	Foxtrot / "Haven't Met You Yet"	10	9	9	9	Eliminated
9	Contemporary / "Gravity"	10	9	10	9	Eliminated

== Education ==
Lee went to Battle Creek Elementary in Saint Paul, Minnesota. She later attended South St. Paul Secondary and received her high school diploma in June 2021. She enrolled at Auburn University in August 2021 as a business marketing major, but left after her sophomore year due to health issues and in order to return to elite gymnastics with her sights set on the 2024 Summer Olympics in Paris.

== Personal life ==
In August 2019, a few days before Lee competed in her first senior U.S. championships, her father suffered a spinal cord injury after falling off a ladder. He was paralyzed from the waist down. The following year, Lee's aunt and uncle died from COVID-19. When discussing these tragedies, Lee said, "I am tougher because of it."

Lee said she was pepper-sprayed in a racial incident in November 2021 while in Los Angeles for her stint on Dancing with the Stars. In January 2022, she spoke about racist comments she had received from her own Hmong-American community about her relationship with then-boyfriend USC Trojans football player Jaylin Smith.

In March 2023, Lee was diagnosed with two kidney diseases, one of which is incurable, that she chooses not to disclose to the public. She sought medical treatment when her entire body swelled and was reportedly nauseous and lightheaded frequently. After seeing various doctors she went to the Mayo Clinic in Rochester, Minnesota. There Lee was diagnosed and started treatment. During this time she took a six-month hiatus from gymnastics. In April 2024, Lee reported that her kidney condition was in remission. At the 2025 ESPY Awards, where Lee won the Best Comeback Athlete ESPY Award, she brought her doctor, Dr. Marcia Faustin, as her guest.

== Competitive skills ==
Among the skills Lee has performed in competition are:

Apparatus	Name	Description	Difficulty (Note: Valid for the 2022–2024 Code of Points)	Performed
Vault	Baitova	Yurchenko entry, laid out salto backwards with two twists	5.0	2019–21, 2024
Uneven bars	Piked Jaeger	Reverse grip swing to piked salto forwards to catch high bar	E	2019–21
Uneven bars	Gienger	Swing fwd and salto bwd with 1/2 turn piked to hang on HB	D	2021, 2024
Uneven bars	Bhardwaj	Laid out salto from high bar to low bar with full twist	E	2019–21, 2024
Uneven bars	Van Leeuwen	Toe-on Shaposhnikova transition with 1/2 twist to high bar	E	2019–21, 2024
Uneven bars	Nabieva	Toe-on to counter reversed laid out hecht over high bar	G	2019–21, 2024
Balance beam	Layout step-out mount	Round-off at end of beam salto bwd stretched with step-out to cross on beam	E	2024
Balance beam	Layout	Laid out salto backwards with legs together (to two feet)	E	2019
Balance beam	Mitchell	1080° (3/1) turn in tuck stand on one leg	E	2019–21, 2023–24
Balance beam	Switch ring	Switch leap to ring position (180° split with raised back leg)	E	2019–21, 2023–24
Floor exercise	Mitchell	1080° (3/1) turn in tuck stand on one leg	E	2019–21, 2024
Floor exercise	Double layout	Double laid out salto backwards	F	2019–21, 2024
Floor exercise	Silivas	Double-twisting (2/1) double tucked salto backwards	H	2019–21
Floor exercise	Chusovitina	Full-twisting (1/1) double layout salto backwards	H	2024

== Competitive history ==
Competitive history of Sunisa Lee at the junior level
Year	Event	Team	AA	VT	UB	BB	FX
2015	Hopes Championships		1st place, gold medalist(s)	6	2nd place, silver medalist(s)	2nd place, silver medalist(s)	
2016	U.S. Classic		16	34	22	15	6
2016	P&G National Championships		10	23	10	20	5
2017	International Gymnix	1st place, gold medalist(s)			2nd place, silver medalist(s)		
2017	U.S. Classic				10	4	
2017	P&G National Championships		8	17	6	11	5
2018	Pacific Rim Championships	1st place, gold medalist(s)		2nd place, silver medalist(s)		2nd place, silver medalist(s)	2nd place, silver medalist(s)
2018	U.S. Classic		5	24	3rd place, bronze medalist(s)	1st place, gold medalist(s)	25
2018	U.S. National Championships		3rd place, bronze medalist(s)	6	1st place, gold medalist(s)	2nd place, silver medalist(s)	5

Competitive history of Sunisa Lee at the senior level
Year	Event	Team	AA	VT	UB	BB	FX
2019	City of Jesolo Trophy	1st place, gold medalist(s)	1st place, gold medalist(s)		1st place, gold medalist(s)	3rd place, bronze medalist(s)	1st place, gold medalist(s)
2019	American Classic				5	2nd place, silver medalist(s)	
2019	U.S. Classic				2nd place, silver medalist(s)	8	
2019	U.S. National Championships		2nd place, silver medalist(s)		1st place, gold medalist(s)	4	3rd place, bronze medalist(s)
2019	Worlds Team Selection Camp		2nd place, silver medalist(s)	6	1st place, gold medalist(s)	2nd place, silver medalist(s)	2nd place, silver medalist(s)
2019	Stuttgart World Championships	1st place, gold medalist(s)	8		3rd place, bronze medalist(s)		2nd place, silver medalist(s)
2021	Winter Cup				1st place, gold medalist(s)	3rd place, bronze medalist(s)	
2021	American Classic				1st place, gold medalist(s)	1st place, gold medalist(s)	5
2021	U.S. Classic				10	8	
2021	U.S. National Championships		2nd place, silver medalist(s)		1st place, gold medalist(s)	2nd place, silver medalist(s)	5
2021	Olympic Trials		2nd place, silver medalist(s)		1st place, gold medalist(s)	1st place, gold medalist(s)	9
2021	Olympic Games	2nd place, silver medalist(s)	1st place, gold medalist(s)		3rd place, bronze medalist(s)	5	
2023	U.S. Classic					2nd place, silver medalist(s)	
2023	U.S. National Championships					3rd place, bronze medalist(s)	
2024	Winter Cup				26	13	
2024	American Classic			11		1st place, gold medalist(s)	
2024	U.S. Classic					1st place, gold medalist(s)	17
2024	U.S. National Championships		4		4	2nd place, silver medalist(s)	10
2024	Olympic Trials		2nd place, silver medalist(s)		1st place, gold medalist(s)	5	7
2024	Olympic Games	1st place, gold medalist(s)	3rd place, bronze medalist(s)		3rd place, bronze medalist(s)	6	

Competitive history of Sunisa Lee at the NCAA level
Year	Event	Team	AA	VT	UB	BB	FX
2022	SEC Championships	3rd place, bronze medalist(s)	9	8	1st place, gold medalist(s)	42	2nd place, silver medalist(s)
2022	NCAA Championships	4	2nd place, silver medalist(s)	29	9	1st place, gold medalist(s)	4

== Awards ==
Year	Award	Result	Ref
2021	Asia Game Changer Award	Won	
2021	Sports Illustrated Female Athlete of the Year	Won	
2022	SEC Freshman of the Year (gymnastics)	Won	
2022	Honda Sports Award (gymnastics)	Nominated	
2022	ESPY: Best Female Athlete	Nominated	
2022	ESPY: Best U.S. Female Olympian	Nominated	
2022	Women's Sports Foundation: Sportswoman of the Year	Won	
2024	Glamour Women of the Year (co-winner)	Won	
2025	ESPY: Best Comeback Athlete	Won	

== Filmography ==
Year	Title	Role	Notes
2020	Defying Gravity: The Untold Story of Women's Gymnastics	Herself	YouTube docuseries
2021	Golden: The Journey of USA's Elite Gymnasts	Herself	Peacock docuseries
2021	Dancing with the Stars	Herself	Contestant on Season 30
2025	Speed Goes Pro	Herself	Guest appearance in IShowSpeed YouTube series
2026	Beef	Herself	

== See also ==
- History of the Hmong in Minneapolis–Saint Paul
