= Chantel Monroe =

American professional wrestler and former artistic gymnast

Personal information
- Born: Derrian Gobourne; January 10, 2000 (age 26) Killeen, Texas, U.S.

Professional wrestling career
- Billed height: 5 ft 4 in (163 cm)
- Trained by: WWE Performance Center
- Debut: May 18, 2024

Derrian Gobourne, known by the ring name Chantel Monroe, is an American professional wrestler and former artistic gymnast signed to WWE, where she performs on the NXT brand. Before entering professional wrestling, she competed in collegiate gymnastics for the Auburn Tigers.

== Early life and gymnastics ==
Gobourne began participating in competitive cheerleading before developing an interest in gymnastics. She started competing in gymnastics at the age of seven and went on to compete at the collegiate level for Auburn University.

In 2019, Gobourne won the NCAA women's vault championship. She subsequently earned further All-American honours while competing for Auburn, including recognition for her performances on the uneven bars and floor exercise in 2022.

In 2022, Gobourne launched the Black Girl Magic non-fungible token collection in partnership with Legacy League. The project featured other Black female collegiate gymnasts and was intended to increase their visibility and opportunities in the name, image and likeness market.

== Professional wrestling career ==
=== WWE (2022–present) ===
In June 2022, Gobourne joined WWE's Next In Line programme, which recruits collegiate athletes and provides them with opportunities to develop their skills for professional wrestling. She initially discussed the opportunity while still competing in gymnastics at Auburn.

In June 2023, Gobourne reported to the WWE Performance Center in Orlando, Florida, to continue her development with the company following her collegiate gymnastics career.

Gobourne made her in-ring debut at an NXT live event on May 18, 2024, teaming with Stevie Turner to face Kendal Grey and Carlee Bright, wrestling under her real name.

In 2025, Gobourne adopted the ring name Chantel Monroe and competed on WWE EVOLVE. Her appearances included matches against competitors such as Layla Diggs, Wendy Choo and Kendal Grey.

Monroe was sidelined in early 2026 because of an ankle injury. She returned to in-ring competition in September, appearing against Maxxine Dupri on WWE Main Event.

In October, Monroe was included in a 20-woman battle royal to determine the number-one contender for the NXT Women's Championship. The match would be won by Wren Sinclair.

Later that month, WWE aired a vignette introducing Monroe to the NXT audience under the presentation of "the Reflection of Perfection". Her arrival prompted comparisons with fellow WWE wrestler Blake Monroe, with both the name and presentation becoming topics of wrestling-media coverage due to their similarity.

== Championships and accomplishments ==
Gymnastics

- NCAA
  - Women's vault champion (2019)
