= Auburn Tigers women's gymnastics =

American college team

Auburn Tigers gymnastics
- Founded: 1974
- University: Auburn University
- Head coach: Ryan Roberts
- Conference: SEC
- Location: Auburn, Alabama
- Home arena: Neville Arena (Capacity: 7,424)
- Nickname: Tigers
- Colors: Burnt orange and navy blue

Four on the Floor appearances
- 2022

Super Six appearances
- 1993, 2015

NCAA Regional championships
- 2016

NCAA Tournament appearances
- 1987, 1988, 1989, 1990, 1991, 1992, 1993, 1994, 1996, 1999, 2003, 2004, 2005, 2006, 2007, 2008, 2009, 2010, 2011, 2012, 2013, 2014, 2015, 2016, 2017, 2018, 2019, 2022, 2023, 2025

The Auburn Tigers women's gymnastics team represents Auburn University in the sport of gymnastics. The team competes in Division I of the National Collegiate Athletics Association (NCAA) and the Southeastern Conference (SEC). The Tigers host their home meets at the Auburn Arena on the school's main Auburn campus. The team is currently led by head coach Ryan Roberts. In their four decades of history, the Tigers have made four appearances at the National Championships; making the Super Six twice.

== History ==
Auburn Gymnastics history dates back to the late 1890s but the Auburn Tigers gymnastics program wasn't founded until 1965 by Edwin Bengston; a kinesiology lecturer at the university and weightlifter. After a successful few years of competition, the program was discontinued. In 1974, the program was reinstated by Bengston; Title IX providing the first form of financial aid of $150 to Jeanne Denoon-Amos.

== Roster ==
2026–2027 Roster
Name	Height	Year	Hometown
Olivia Ahern	5-0	JR	Memphis, TN
Adela Balcová		FR	Bratislava, Slovakia
Bryn Bartman	5-1	JR	Black Mountain, NC
Sophia Bell	5-2	JR	Blue Springs, MO
Kaylee Bluffstone		SR	Tampa, FL
Charlotte Booth		SO	Clermont, FL
Emma Grace Boyd	5-6	SR	Windermere, FL
Molly Brinkman	5-3	SO	Chandler, AZ
Olivia Greaves	5-5	SR	Staten Island, NY
Sophia Greaves		SR	Staten Island, NY
Lauren Hollifield	5-0	JR	Dacula, GA
Julianne Huff	5-1	SR	Hoover, AL
Alex Irvine	5-5	SR	Roseville, CA
Katelyn Jong	5-2	JR	Allen, TX
Olivia Kennedy	5-3	SR	Maryville, TN
Mia Leverton		SO	Murrells Inlet, SC
Marissa Neal	5-2	JR	Blue Springs, MO
Lily Power		FR	Ramsey, NJ
Rebekah Smith		SO	Houston, TX
Brynn Torry		SO	Yorktown, VA
Emma Wehry		SR	Klingerstown, PA
Jersie Woolsey		SR	Riverton, UT
Paige Zancan	5-5	SR	Mt. Airy, MD

- Head coach: Ryan Roberts
- Associate head coach: Aja Sims-Fletcher
- Assistant coach: Adam Duncan
- Assistant coach: Sophia Davila

== Past Olympians ==
- Sunisa Lee (2020, 2024)
- Charlotte Booth (United Kingdom) (2024 alternate)
