= United States at the World Artistic Gymnastics Championships =

- Flag of the United States
- IOC code: USA
- Website: www.usagym.org
- Medals: Gold 71 Silver 59 Bronze 51 Total 181

The United States first competed at the World Artistic Gymnastics Championships in 1958. They only sent a men's team; they finished seventh. In 1962 they sent both a men's team and a women's team; they finished sixth and eighth respectively. In 1970 Cathy Rigby became the first American to win a medal at the World Championships, winning a silver on the balance beam. In 1978 Kurt Thomas and Marcia Frederick became the first Americans to win a gold medal at the World Championships.

== Medalists ==
| Medal | Name | Year | Event |
|---|---|---|---|
| Silver | Cathy Rigby | (Socialist Federal Republic of Yugoslavia) 1970 Ljubljana | Women's balance beam |
| Gold | Kurt Thomas | (France) 1978 Strasbourg | Men's floor exercise |
| Gold | Marcia Frederick | (France) 1978 Strasbourg | Women's uneven bars |
| Bronze | Kathy Johnson | (France) 1978 Strasbourg | Women's floor exercise |
| Bronze | Kurt Thomas, Bart Conner, Jim Hartung, Larry Gerard, Tim LaFleur, Peter Vidmar, Mike Wilson | (United States) 1979 Fort Worth | Men's team |
| Silver | Kurt Thomas | (United States) 1979 Fort Worth | Men's all-around |
| Gold | Kurt Thomas | (United States) 1979 Fort Worth | Men's floor exercise |
| Silver | Kurt Thomas | (United States) 1979 Fort Worth | Men's pommel horse |
| Bronze | Bart Conner | (United States) 1979 Fort Worth | Men's vault |
| Gold | Bart Conner | (United States) 1979 Fort Worth | Men's parallel bar |
| Silver | Kurt Thomas | (United States) 1979 Fort Worth | Men's parallel bar |
| Gold | Kurt Thomas | (United States) 1979 Fort Worth | Men's horizontal bar |
| Bronze | Julianne McNamara | (Soviet Union) 1981 Moscow | Women's uneven bars |
| Bronze | Tracee Talavera | (Soviet Union) 1981 Moscow | Women's balance beam |
| Silver | Brandy Johnson | (West Germany) 1989 Stuttgart | Women's vault |
| Silver | Shannon Miller, Kim Zmeskal, Betty Okino, Kerri Strug, Michelle Campi, Hilary Grivich | (United States) 1991 Indianapolis | Women's team |
| Gold | Kim Zmeskal | (United States) 1991 Indianapolis | Women's all-around |
| Silver | Shannon Miller | (United States) 1991 Indianapolis | Women's uneven bars |
| Bronze | Betty Okino | (United States) 1991 Indianapolis | Women's balance beam |
| Bronze | Kim Zmeskal | (United States) 1991 Indianapolis | Women's floor exercise |
| Silver | Betty Okino | (France) 1992 Paris | Women's uneven bars |
| Gold | Kim Zmeskal | (France) 1992 Paris | Women's balance beam |
| Gold | Kim Zmeskal | (France) 1992 Paris | Women's floor exercise |
| Gold | Shannon Miller | (United Kingdom) 1993 Birmingham | Women's all-around |
| Gold | Shannon Miller | (United Kingdom) 1993 Birmingham | Women's uneven bars |
| Silver | Dominique Dawes | (United Kingdom) 1993 Birmingham | Women's uneven bars |
| Silver | Dominique Dawes | (United Kingdom) 1993 Birmingham | Women's balance beam |
| Gold | Shannon Miller | (United Kingdom) 1993 Birmingham | Women's floor exercise |
| Silver | Amanda Borden, Amy Chow, Dominique Dawes, Larissa Fontaine, Shannon Miller, Jaycie Phelps, Kerri Strug | (Germany) 1994 Dortmund | Women's team |
| Gold | Shannon Miller | (Australia) 1994 Brisbane | Women's all-around |
| Silver | Paul O'Neill | (Australia) 1994 Brisbane | Men's rings |
| Gold | Shannon Miller | (Australia) 1994 Brisbane | Women's balance beam |
| Bronze | Shannon Miller, Dominique Moceanu, Kerri Strug, Donielle Thompson, Jaycie Phelps, Mary Beth Arnold, Teresa Kulikowski | (Japan) 1995 Sabae | Women's team |
| Silver | Dominique Moceanu | (Japan) 1995 Sabae | Women's balance beam |
| Bronze | Dominique Dawes | (Puerto Rico) 1996 San Juan | Women's balance beam |
| Silver | Raj Bhavsar, Paul Hamm, Stephen McCain, Brett McClure, Sean Townsend, Guard Young | (Belgium) 2001 Ghent | Men's team |
| Bronze | Mohini Bhardwaj, Katie Heenan, Ashley Miles, Tasha Schwikert, Rachel Tidd, Tabitha Yim | (Belgium) 2001 Ghent | Women's team |
| Bronze | Katie Heenan | (Belgium) 2001 Ghent | Women's uneven bars |
| Gold | Sean Townsend | (Belgium) 2001 Ghent | Men's parallel bars |
| Bronze | Paul Hamm | (Hungary) 2002 Debrecen | Men's floor exercise |
| Gold | Courtney Kupets | (Hungary) 2002 Debrecen | Women's uneven bars |
| Gold | Ashley Postell | (Hungary) 2002 Debrecen | Women's balance beam |
| Bronze | Samantha Sheehan | (Hungary) 2002 Debrecen | Women's floor exercise |
| Silver | Raj Bhavsar, Jason Gatson, Morgan Hamm, Paul Hamm, Brett McClure, Blaine Wilson | (United States) 2003 Anaheim | Men's team |
| Gold | Terin Humphrey, Courtney Kupets, Chellsie Memmel, Carly Patterson, Tasha Schwikert, Hollie Vise | (United States) 2003 Anaheim | Women's team |
| Gold | Paul Hamm | (United States) 2003 Anaheim | Men's all-around |
| Silver | Carly Patterson | (United States) 2003 Anaheim | Women's all-around |
| Gold | Paul Hamm | (United States) 2003 Anaheim | Men's floor exercise |
| Gold | Chellsie Memmel | (United States) 2003 Anaheim | Women's uneven bars |
| Gold | Hollie Vise | (United States) 2003 Anaheim | Women's uneven bars |
| Gold | Chellsie Memmel | (Australia) 2005 Melbourne | Women's all-around |
| Silver | Nastia Liukin | (Australia) 2005 Melbourne | Women's all-around |
| Bronze | Alicia Sacramone | (Australia) 2005 Melbourne | Women's vault |
| Gold | Nastia Liukin | (Australia) 2005 Melbourne | Women's uneven bars |
| Silver | Chellsie Memmel | (Australia) 2005 Melbourne | Women's uneven bars |
| Gold | Nastia Liukin | (Australia) 2005 Melbourne | Women's balance beam |
| Silver | Chellsie Memmel | (Australia) 2005 Melbourne | Women's balance beam |
| Gold | Alicia Sacramone | (Australia) 2005 Melbourne | Women's floor exercise |
| Silver | Nastia Liukin | (Australia) 2005 Melbourne | Women's floor exercise |
| Silver | Jana Bieger, Natasha Kelley, Nastia Liukin, Chellsie Memmel, Ashley Priess, Alicia Sacramone | (Denmark) 2006 Aarhus | Women's team |
| Silver | Jana Bieger | (Denmark) 2006 Aarhus | Women's all-around |
| Silver | Alicia Sacramone | (Denmark) 2006 Aarhus | Women's vault |
| Silver | Nastia Liukin | (Denmark) 2006 Aarhus | Women's uneven bars |
| Bronze | Alexander Artemev | (Denmark) 2006 Aarhus | Men's pommel horse |
| Silver | Jana Bieger | (Denmark) 2006 Aarhus | Women's floor exercise |
| Gold | Ivana Hong, Shawn Johnson, Nastia Liukin, Samantha Peszek, Alicia Sacramone, Shayla Worley | (Germany) 2007 Stuttgart | Women's team |
| Gold | Shawn Johnson | (Germany) 2007 Stuttgart | Women's all-around |
| Bronze | Alicia Sacramone | (Germany) 2007 Stuttgart | Women's vault |
| Silver | Nastia Liukin | (Germany) 2007 Stuttgart | Women's uneven bars |
| Gold | Nastia Liukin | (Germany) 2007 Stuttgart | Women's balance beam |
| Gold | Shawn Johnson | (Germany) 2007 Stuttgart | Women's floor exercise |
| Silver | Alicia Sacramone | (Germany) 2007 Stuttgart | Women's floor exercise |
| Gold | Bridget Sloan | (United Kingdom) 2009 London | Women's all-around |
| Silver | Rebecca Bross | (United Kingdom) 2009 London | Women's all-around |
| Gold | Kayla Williams | (United Kingdom) 2009 London | Women's vault |
| Bronze | Rebecca Bross | (United Kingdom) 2009 London | Women's uneven bars |
| Bronze | Ivana Hong | (United Kingdom) 2009 London | Women's balance beam |
| Silver | Rebecca Bross, Mackenzie Caquatto, Bridget Sloan, Mattie Larson, Aly Raisman, Alicia Sacramone | (Netherlands) 2010 Rotterdam | Women's team |
| Bronze | Jonathan Horton | (Netherlands) 2010 Rotterdam | Men's all-around |
| Bronze | Rebecca Bross | (Netherlands) 2010 Rotterdam | Women's all-around |
| Gold | Alicia Sacramone | (Netherlands) 2010 Rotterdam | Women's vault |
| Bronze | Rebecca Bross | (Netherlands) 2010 Rotterdam | Women's uneven bars |
| Silver | Rebecca Bross | (Netherlands) 2010 Rotterdam | Women's balance beam |
| Bronze | Jacob Dalton, Jonathan Horton, Danell Leyva, Steven Legendre, Alexander Naddour, John Orozco | (Japan) 2011 Tokyo | Men's team |
| Gold | Gabby Douglas, McKayla Maroney, Aly Raisman, Alicia Sacramone, Sabrina Vega, Jordyn Wieber | (Japan) 2011 Tokyo | Women's team |
| Gold | Jordyn Wieber | (Japan) 2011 Tokyo | Women's all-around |
| Gold | McKayla Maroney | (Japan) 2011 Tokyo | Women's vault |
| Bronze | Jordyn Wieber | (Japan) 2011 Tokyo | Women's balance beam |
| Gold | Danell Leyva | (Japan) 2011 Tokyo | Men's parallel bars |
| Bronze | Aly Raisman | (Japan) 2011 Tokyo | Women's floor exercise |
| Gold | Simone Biles | (Belgium) 2013 Antwerp | Women's all-around |
| Silver | Kyla Ross | (Belgium) 2013 Antwerp | Women's all-around |
| Silver | Jake Dalton | (Belgium) 2013 Antwerp | Men's floor exercise |
| Gold | McKayla Maroney | (Belgium) 2013 Antwerp | Women's vault |
| Silver | Simone Biles | (Belgium) 2013 Antwerp | Women's vault |
| Silver | Kyla Ross | (Belgium) 2013 Antwerp | Women's uneven bars |
| Bronze | Brandon Wynn | (Belgium) 2013 Antwerp | Men's rings |
| Silver | Steven Legendre | (Belgium) 2013 Antwerp | Men's vault |
| Silver | Kyla Ross | (Belgium) 2013 Antwerp | Women's balance beam |
| Bronze | Simone Biles | (Belgium) 2013 Antwerp | Women's balance beam |
| Bronze | John Orozco | (Belgium) 2013 Antwerp | Men's parallel bars |
| Gold | Simone Biles | (Belgium) 2013 Antwerp | Women's floor exercise |
| Bronze | Jacob Dalton, Danell Leyva, Sam Mikulak, Alexander Naddour, John Orozco, Donnell Whittenburg, Paul Ruggeri | (China) 2014 Nanning | Men's team |
| Gold | Alyssa Baumann, Simone Biles, Madison Kocian, Ashton Locklear, Kyla Ross, MyKayla Skinner, Madison Desch | (China) 2014 Nanning | Women's team |
| Gold | Simone Biles | (China) 2014 Nanning | Women's all-around |
| Bronze | Kyla Ross | (China) 2014 Nanning | Women's all-around |
| Silver | Simone Biles | (China) 2014 Nanning | Women's vault |
| Bronze | MyKayla Skinner | (China) 2014 Nanning | Women's vault |
| Bronze | Jake Dalton | (China) 2014 Nanning | Men's vault |
| Gold | Simone Biles | (China) 2014 Nanning | Women's balance beam |
| Silver | Danell Leyva | (China) 2014 Nanning | Men's parallel bars |
| Gold | Simone Biles | (China) 2014 Nanning | Women's floor exercise |
| Gold | Simone Biles, Gabby Douglas, Brenna Dowell, Madison Kocian, Maggie Nichols, Aly Raisman, MyKayla Skinner | (United Kingdom) 2015 Glasgow | Women's team |
| Gold | Simone Biles | (United Kingdom) 2015 Glasgow | Women's all-around |
| Silver | Gabby Douglas | (United Kingdom) 2015 Glasgow | Women's all-around |
| Bronze | Simone Biles | (United Kingdom) 2015 Glasgow | Women's vault |
| Gold | Madison Kocian | (United Kingdom) 2015 Glasgow | Women's uneven bars |
| Bronze | Donnell Whittenburg | (United Kingdom) 2015 Glasgow | Men's vault |
| Gold | Simone Biles | (United Kingdom) 2015 Glasgow | Women's balance beam |
| Gold | Simone Biles | (United Kingdom) 2015 Glasgow | Women's floor exercise |
| Bronze | Maggie Nichols | (United Kingdom) 2015 Glasgow | Women's floor exercise |
| Silver | Danell Leyva | (United Kingdom) 2015 Glasgow | Men's horizontal bar |
| Gold | Morgan Hurd | (Canada) 2017 Montreal | Women's all-around |
| Bronze | Yul Moldauer | (Canada) 2017 Montreal | Men's floor exercise |
| Silver | Jade Carey | (Canada) 2017 Montreal | Women's vault |
| Silver | Morgan Hurd | (Canada) 2017 Montreal | Women's balance beam |
| Silver | Jade Carey | (Canada) 2017 Montreal | Women's floor exercise |
| Gold | Simone Biles, Kara Eaker, Morgan Hurd, Grace McCallum, Riley McCusker, Ragan Smith | (Qatar) 2018 Doha | Women's team |
| Gold | Simone Biles | (Qatar) 2018 Doha | Women's all-around |
| Bronze | Morgan Hurd | (Qatar) 2018 Doha | Women's all-around |
| Gold | Simone Biles | (Qatar) 2018 Doha | Women's vault |
| Silver | Simone Biles | (Qatar) 2018 Doha | Women's uneven bars |
| Bronze | Simone Biles | (Qatar) 2018 Doha | Women's balance beam |
| Gold | Simone Biles | (Qatar) 2018 Doha | Women's floor exercise |
| Silver | Morgan Hurd | (Qatar) 2018 Doha | Women's floor exercise |
| Bronze | Sam Mikulak | (Qatar) 2018 Doha | Men's horizontal bar |
| Gold | Simone Biles, Jade Carey, Kara Eaker, Sunisa Lee, Grace McCallum, MyKayla Skinner | (Germany) 2019 Stuttgart | Women's team |
| Gold | Simone Biles | (Germany) 2019 Stuttgart | Women's all-around |
| Gold | Simone Biles | (Germany) 2019 Stuttgart | Women's vault |
| Silver | Jade Carey | (Germany) 2019 Stuttgart | Women's vault |
| Bronze | Sunisa Lee | (Germany) 2019 Stuttgart | Women's uneven bars |
| Gold | Simone Biles | (Germany) 2019 Stuttgart | Women's balance beam |
| Gold | Simone Biles | (Germany) 2019 Stuttgart | Women's floor exercise |
| Silver | Sunisa Lee | (Germany) 2019 Stuttgart | Women's floor exercise |
| Silver | Leanne Wong | (Japan) 2021 Kitakyushu | Women's all-around |
| Bronze | Kayla DiCello | (Japan) 2021 Kitakyushu | Women's all-around |
| Gold | Stephen Nedoroscik | (Japan) 2021 Kitakyushu | Men's pommel horse |
| Bronze | Leanne Wong | (Japan) 2021 Kitakyushu | Women's floor exercise |
| Bronze | Brody Malone | (Japan) 2021 Kitakyushu | Men's horizontal bar |
| Gold | Skye Blakely, Jade Carey, Jordan Chiles, Shilese Jones, Leanne Wong, Lexi Zeiss | (United Kingdom) 2022 Liverpool | Women's team |
| Silver | Shilese Jones | (United Kingdom) 2022 Liverpool | Women's all-around |
| Gold | Jade Carey | (United Kingdom) 2022 Liverpool | Women's vault |
| Silver | Jordan Chiles | (United Kingdom) 2022 Liverpool | Women's vault |
| Silver | Shilese Jones | (United Kingdom) 2022 Liverpool | Women's uneven bars |
| Silver | Jordan Chiles | (United Kingdom) 2022 Liverpool | Women's floor exercise |
| Bronze | Jade Carey | (United Kingdom) 2022 Liverpool | Women's floor exercise |
| Gold | Brody Malone | (United Kingdom) 2022 Liverpool | Men's horizontal bar |
| Bronze | Asher Hong, Paul Juda, Yul Moldauer, Fred Richard, Khoi Young, Colt Walker | (Belgium) 2023 Antwerp | Men's team |
| Gold | Simone Biles, Skye Blakely, Shilese Jones, Joscelyn Roberson, Leanne Wong, Kayla DiCello | (Belgium) 2023 Antwerp | Women's team |
| Bronze | Fred Richard | (Belgium) 2023 Antwerp | Men's all-around |
| Gold | Simone Biles | (Belgium) 2023 Antwerp | Women's all-around |
| Bronze | Shilese Jones | (Belgium) 2023 Antwerp | Women's all-around |
| Silver | Simone Biles | (Belgium) 2023 Antwerp | Women's vault |
| Silver | Khoi Young | (Belgium) 2023 Antwerp | Men's pommel horse |
| Bronze | Shilese Jones | (Belgium) 2023 Antwerp | Women's uneven bars |
| Silver | Khoi Young | (Belgium) 2023 Antwerp | Men's vault |
| Gold | Simone Biles | (Belgium) 2023 Antwerp | Women's balance beam |
| Gold | Simone Biles | (Belgium) 2023 Antwerp | Women's floor exercise |
| Silver | Leanne Wong | (Indonesia) 2025 Jakarta | Women's all-around |
| Bronze | Joscelyn Roberson | (Indonesia) 2025 Jakarta | Women's vault |
| Bronze | Patrick Hoopes | (Indonesia) 2025 Jakarta | Men's pommel horse |
| Gold | Donnell Whittenburg | (Indonesia) 2025 Jakarta | Men's rings |
| Gold | Brody Malone | (Indonesia) 2025 Jakarta | Men's horizontal bar |
| Silver | Skye Blakely, Charleigh Bullock, Dulcy Caylor, Reese Esponda, Claire Pease, Hezly Rivera | (Netherlands) 2026 Rotterdam | Women's team |
| Gold | Skye Blakely | (Netherlands) 2026 Rotterdam | Women's all-around |
| Gold | Fred Richard | (Netherlands) 2026 Rotterdam | Men's floor exercise |
| Silver | Claire Pease | (Netherlands) 2026 Rotterdam | Women's vault |
| Bronze | Skye Blakely | (Netherlands) 2026 Rotterdam | Women's vault |
| Bronze | Skye Blakely | (Netherlands) 2026 Rotterdam | Women's uneven bars |
| Gold | Claire Pease | (Netherlands) 2026 Rotterdam | Women's floor exercise |
| Silver | Reese Esponda | (Netherlands) 2026 Rotterdam | Women's floor exercise |

== Medal tables ==
=== By gender ===
| Gender | Gold | Silver | Bronze | Total |
|---|---|---|---|---|
| Women | 58 | 47 | 34 | 139 |
| Men | 13 | 12 | 17 | 42 |

=== By event ===
| Event | Gold | Silver | Bronze | Total |
|---|---|---|---|---|
| Women's individual all-around | 15 | 9 | 5 | 29 |
| Women's floor exercise | 11 | 8 | 7 | 26 |
| Women's balance beam | 9 | 7 | 7 | 23 |
| Women's team | 9 | 5 | 2 | 16 |
| Women's uneven bars | 7 | 9 | 7 | 23 |
| Women's vault | 7 | 9 | 6 | 22 |
| Men's floor exercise | 4 | 1 | 2 | 7 |
| Men's parallel bars | 3 | 2 | 1 | 6 |
| Men's horizontal bar | 3 | 1 | 2 | 6 |
| Men's pommel horse | 1 | 2 | 2 | 5 |
| Men's individual all-around | 1 | 1 | 2 | 4 |
| Men's rings | 1 | 1 | 1 | 3 |
| Men's team | 0 | 2 | 4 | 6 |
| Men's vault | 0 | 2 | 3 | 5 |

== Junior World medalists ==
| Medal | Name | Year | Event |
|---|---|---|---|
| Bronze | Sydney Barros, Skye Blakely, Kayla DiCello, Konnor McClain | (Hungary) 2019 Győr | Girls' team |
| Gold | Kayla DiCello | (Hungary) 2019 Győr | Girls' vault |
| Bronze | Kayla DiCello | (Hungary) 2019 Győr | Girls' balance beam |
| Silver | Jayla Hang, Hezly Rivera, Izzy Stassi, Kieryn Finnell | (Turkey) 2023 Antalya | Girls' team |
| Silver | Hezly Rivera | (Turkey) 2023 Antalya | Girls' floor exercise |
| Bronze | Danila Leykin, Dante Reive, Nathan Roman, Maksim Kan | (Philippines) 2025 Manila | Boys' team |
| Bronze | Charleigh Bullock, Lavi Crain, Caroline Moreau, Addy Fulcher | (Philippines) 2025 Manila | Girls' team |
| Gold | Lavi Crain | (Philippines) 2025 Manila | Girls' vault |
| Bronze | Caroline Moreau | (Philippines) 2025 Manila | Girls' uneven bars |
| Gold | Dante Reive | (Philippines) 2025 Manila | Boys' rings |
| Bronze | Caroline Moreau | (Philippines) 2025 Manila | Girls' balance beam |
| Bronze | Danila Leykin | (Philippines) 2025 Manila | Boys' parallel bars |
| Silver | Danila Leykin | (Philippines) 2025 Manila | Boys' horizontal bar |

== See also ==
- United States men's national artistic gymnastics team
- United States women's national artistic gymnastics team
- List of Olympic male artistic gymnasts for the United States
- List of Olympic female artistic gymnasts for the United States
