= 2016 United States Olympic trials (gymnastics) =

2016 U.S. Olympic trials
- Venue: SAP Center (W); Chaifetz Arena (M)
- Location: San Jose, California (W); St. Louis, Missouri (M)
- Date: July 8–10, 2016 (W); June 23–26, 2016 (M)
- Competitors: see participants
- Website: www.sanjose2016.com

The 2016 U.S. Olympic gymnastics team trials were split into separate events for Women's Artistic Gymnastics and Men's Artistic Gymnastics. The women's event was held from July 8 to 10, 2016 at the SAP Center in San Jose, California and the men's event was held June 23–26, 2016 at Chaifetz Arena in St. Louis, Missouri.

== Venue ==
The women's event was held at the SAP Center, which has a capacity of up to 19,190 spectators for concerts and hosted the 2012 U.S. Olympic trials, which held both women's and men's artistic gymnastics events. It is home to the National Hockey League team, the San Jose Sharks. The men's event was held at Chaifetz Arena.

== Promotion ==
In February 2016, 2008 Olympian Shawn Johnson visited the San Jose area to promote the women's event. 2012 Olympian Jordyn Wieber visited St. Louis to promote the men's event in early June.

=== Ticket sales ===
On May 3, 2016, it was revealed that the competition had sold out.

== Participants ==
| Name | Hometown | Club | College | Nationals |
|---|---|---|---|---|
| ~~Alyssa Baumann~~ (Note: On June 30, Baumann announced she had to withdraw from Olympic trials due to an elbow injury.) | Plano, TX | WOGA | Florida (2017–18) | 7th |
| Simone Biles | Spring, TX | World Champions | — (Note: Athlete turned professional, forfeiting NCAA eligibility) | 1st |
| Christina Desiderio | Hackettstown, NJ | Parkettes | LSU (2017–18) | 12th |
| Gabby Douglas | Tarzana, CA | Buckeye | — | 4th |
| Brenna Dowell | Odessa, MO | GAGE | Oklahoma (2014–15) | 11th |
| Rachel Gowey | Urbandale, IA | Chow's | Florida (2016–17) | 9th |
| Laurie Hernandez | Old Bridge, NJ | MG Elite, Inc. | — | 3rd |
| Amelia Hundley | Hamilton, OH | Cincinnati | Florida (2016–17) | 6th |
| Madison Kocian | Dallas, TX | WOGA | UCLA (2016–17) | 5th |
| Ashton Locklear | Hamlet, NC | Everest | — | 22nd |
| Maggie Nichols | Little Canada, MN | Twin City Twisters | Oklahoma (2016–17) | 23rd |
| Aly Raisman | Needham, MA | Brestyan's | — | 2nd |
| Emily Schild | Huntersville, NC | Everest | Georgia (2017–18) | 13th |
| MyKayla Skinner | Gilbert, AZ | Desert Lights | Utah (2016–17) | 10th |
| Ragan Smith | Lewisville, TX | Texas Dreams | Oklahoma (2019–20) | 8th |

== Broadcast ==
NBC broadcast both nights of competition at trials.

== Results ==
=== Final standings ===
| Event | Gold | Silver | Bronze |
|---|---|---|---|
Women
| All-around | Simone Biles | Laurie Hernandez | Aly Raisman |
| Vault | Simone Biles | MyKayla Skinner | Aly Raisman |
| Uneven Bars | Madison Kocian | Ashton Locklear | Gabby Douglas |
| Balance Beam | Laurie Hernandez | Ragan Smith | Aly Raisman |
| Floor Exercise | Simone Biles | Aly Raisman | Laurie Hernandez |
Men
| All-around | Sam Mikulak | Chris Brooks | Jacob Dalton |
| Floor | Jacob Dalton | Eddie Penev | Paul Ruggeri |
| Pommel horse | Alex Naddour Sam Mikulak | —N/a | Donothan Bailey |
| Rings | CJ Maestas | Donnell Whittenburg | Alex Naddour |
| Vault | Jacob Dalton | Donnell Whittenburg | Sam Mikulak |
| Parallel bars | Chris Brooks | Danell Leyva | Donnell Whittenburg |
| Horizontal bar | Chris Brooks | John Orozco | Donnell Whittenburg |

=== Final scores ===
Full Olympic trial scores are as follows:

| Rank | Gymnast | Vault (gymnastics) | Uneven bars | Balance beam | Floor (gymnastics) | Day Total | Total |
|---|---|---|---|---|---|---|---|
| 1st place, gold medalist(s) | Simone Biles | 16.000 | 14.950 | 15.200 | 15.700 | 61.850 | 123.250 |
| 1st place, gold medalist(s) | Simone Biles | 16.200 | 14.900 | 14.750 | 15.550 | 61.400 | 123.250 |
| 2nd place, silver medalist(s) | Laurie Hernandez | 15.150 | 14.900 | 15.500 | 15.300 | 60.850 | 121.150 |
| 2nd place, silver medalist(s) | Laurie Hernandez | 15.150 | 14.750 | 15.700 | 14.700 | 60.300 | 121.150 |
| 3rd place, bronze medalist(s) | Aly Raisman | 15.250 | 14.450 | 14.800 | 15.450 | 59.950 | 119.750 |
| 3rd place, bronze medalist(s) | Aly Raisman | 15.200 | 14.300 | 15.250 | 15.050 | 59.800 | 119.750 |
| 4 | MyKayla Skinner | 15.500 | 14.300 | 14.850 | 14.800 | 59.450 | 118.600 |
| 4 | MyKayla Skinner | 15.450 | 14.400 | 14.500 | 14.800 | 59.150 | 118.600 |
| 5 | Ragan Smith | 14.700 | 14.600 | 14.900 | 14.500 | 58.700 | 117.750 |
| 5 | Ragan Smith | 14.550 | 14.500 | 15.300 | 14.700 | 59.050 | 117.750 |
| 6 | Maggie Nichols | 15.100 | 14.550 | 13.700 | 14.900 | 58.250 | 117.600 |
| 6 | Maggie Nichols | 15.100 | 14.600 | 14.900 | 14.750 | 59.350 | 117.600 |
| 7 | Gabby Douglas | 15.100 | 15.100 | 13.700 | 14.650 | 58.550 | 117.450 |
| 7 | Gabby Douglas | 15.000 | 15.250 | 14.100 | 14.550 | 58.900 | 117.450 |
| 8 | Madison Kocian | 13.900 | 15.750 | 14.700 | 14.250 | 58.600 | 117.050 |
| 8 | Madison Kocian | 14.000 | 15.900 | 13.850 | 14.700 | 58.450 | 117.050 |
| 9 | Amelia Hundley | 14.950 | 14.700 | 14.100 | 14.250 | 58.000 | 116.850 |
| 9 | Amelia Hundley | 15.100 | 14.750 | 14.400 | 14.600 | 58.850 | 116.850 |
| 10 | Brenna Dowell | 14.850 | 14.900 | 13.600 | 14.550 | 57.900 | 116.600 |
| 10 | Brenna Dowell | 15.100 | 14.950 | 14.150 | 14.500 | 58.700 | 116.600 |
| 11 | Rachel Gowey | 14.400 | 14.900 | 14.200 | 12.900 | 56.400 | 114.250 |
| 11 | Rachel Gowey | 14.900 | 14.800 | 14.700 | 13.450 | 57.850 | 114.250 |
| 12 | Christina Desiderio | 14.300 | 13.500 | 14.400 | 12.900 | 56.650 | 112.150 |
| 12 | Christina Desiderio | 12.950 | 13.500 | 14.650 | 13.450 | 55.500 | 112.150 |
| 13 | Emily Schild | 14.950 | 13.900 | 12.750 | 13.800 | 55.400 | 111.950 |
| 13 | Emily Schild | 14.700 | 14.150 | 14.150 | 13.550 | 56.550 | 111.950 |
| 14 | Ashton Locklear | – | 15.750 | 13.200 | – | 28.950 | 59.050 |
| 14 | Ashton Locklear | – | 15.700 | 14.400 | – | 30.100 | 59.050 |

== Olympic team selection ==
=== Women's team ===
Simone Biles, Aly Raisman, Laurie Hernandez, Madison Kocian, and Gabby Douglas were selected to represent the United States at the 2016 Summer Olympics in Rio de Janeiro, Brazil. MyKayla Skinner, Ragan Smith, and Ashton Locklear were selected as the three alternates.

=== Men's team ===
Sam Mikulak was automatically named to the Olympic team after scoring the highest four day all-around total from both Olympic trials and the 2016 National Championships. The selection committee then named Chris Brooks, Alex Naddour, Jacob Dalton, and John Orozco to the team. Danell Leyva, Akash Modi, and Donnell Whittenburg were named as the alternates.

Two weeks after the Olympic trials Orozco tore his ACL and meniscus. Levya was selected as his replacement.
