= 2013 U.S. National Gymnastics Championships =

2013 P&G U.S. National Gymnastics Championships
- Venue: XL Center
- Location: Hartford, Connecticut, U.S.
- Date: August 15, 2013—August 18, 2013

The 2013 P&G U.S. National Gymnastics Championships was the 50th edition of the U.S. National Gymnastics Championships. The competition was held from August 15–18, 2013 at the XL Center in Hartford, Connecticut.

== Event information ==
The fiftieth edition of the Championships, the competition was held at the XL Center in Hartford, Connecticut, a multi-purpose arena and convention center located in downtown Hartford, Connecticut. The XL Center is home to the University of Connecticut Men's & Women's Basketball teams along with the Hartford Wolf Pack, the American Hockey League affiliate of the New York Rangers. The competition was televised by NBC Sports Network.

=== Competition schedule ===
The competition featured Senior and Junior competitions for both women's and men's disciplines. The competition was as follows;

Thursday, August 15

1:00 pm – Jr. Women's Competition – Day 1
7:30 pm – Sr. Women's Competition – Day 1

Friday, August 16

1:00 pm – Jr. Men's Competition – Day 1
7:00 pm – Sr. Men's Competition – Day 1

Saturday, August 17

2:00 pm – Jr. Women's Competition – Final Day
7:30 pm – Sr. Women's Competition – Final Day

Sunday, August 18

11:30 am – Sr. Men's Competition – Final Day
6:30 pm – Jr. Men's Competition – Final Day

Note: all times are in Eastern Time Zone.

=== Sponsorship ===
Procter & Gamble, a multinational consumer goods company, was the title sponsor of the event; as part of the a deal the company signed with USA Gymnastics from 2013–16.

== Medalists ==
Event	Gold	Silver	Bronze
Senior Women
Individual all-around	Simone Biles	Kyla Ross	Brenna Dowell
Vault	McKayla Maroney	Simone Biles	MyKayla Skinner
Uneven bars	Kyla Ross	Simone Biles	Brenna Dowell
Balance beam	Kyla Ross	Simone Biles	Kennedy Baker
Floor	McKayla Maroney	Simone Biles	MyKayla Skinner
Junior Women
Individual all-around	Bailie Key	Laurie Hernandez	Amelia Hundley
Vault	Ariana Agrapides	Vanasia Bradley; Nia Dennis	N/A
Uneven bars	Amelia Hundley	Laurie Hernandez	Polina Shchennikova
Balance beam	Bailie Key	Norah Flatley	Alexis Vasquez; Laurie Hernandez
Floor	Bailie Key	Laurie Hernandez	Amelia Hundley
Senior Men
Individual all-around	Sam Mikulak	Alexander Naddour	Jacob Dalton
Floor	Steven Legendre	Paul Ruggeri	Jacob Dalton
Pommel horse	Alexander Naddour	Luke Stannard	Michael Newburger
Rings	Brandon Wynn	Alexander Naddour	Michael Squires
Vault	Sean Senters	Eddie Penev	Paul Ruggeri
Parallel bars	Sam Mikulak	John Orozco	Akash Modi
Horizontal bar	Sam Mikulak	John Orozco	Danell Leyva

== National team ==
The following seniors were named to the National Team – Kennedy Baker, Simone Biles, Brenna Dowell, Peyton Ernst, Madison Kocian, McKayla Maroney, Maggie Nichols, Elizabeth Price, Lexie Priessman, Kyla Ross, MyKayla Skinner. The following juniors were named to the National Team – Alyssa Baumann, Nia Dennis, Norah Flatley, Lauren Hernandez, Veronica Hults, Amelia Hundley, Bailie Key, Polina Shchennikova.

== Participants ==
The following individuals are participating in competition:

=== Senior ===
- MyKayla Skinner
- Erin Macadaeg
- McKayla Maroney
- Kyla Ross
- Madison Desch
- Maggie Nichols
- Lexie Priessman
- Elizabeth Price
- Kennedy Baker
- Simone Biles
- Peyton Ernst
- Ariana Guerra
- Madison Kocian
- Abigail Milliet
- Brenna Dowell

=== Junior ===
- Abby Paulson
- Alexandra Marks
- Alexis Vasquez
- Alyssa Baumann
- Amelia Hundley
- Ariana Agrapides
- Ashley Foss
- Ashton Locklear
- Bailie Key
- Bridget Dean
- Christina Desiderio
- Deanne Soza
- Emily Gaskins
- Emily Schild
- Felicia Hano
- Grace Quinn
- Grace Waguespack
- Jordan Chiles
- Lauren Farley
- Lauren Navarro
- Laurie Hernandez
- Lexy Ramler
- Megan Skaggs
- Melissa Reinstadtler
- Molly Frack
- Nadia Cho
- Nia Dennis
- Norah Flatley
- Polina Shchennikova
- Ragan Smith
- Samantha Ogden
- Sydney Johnson-Scharpf
- Vanasia Bradley
- Veronica Hults
