= Eddie Penev =

Bulgarian gymnast (born 1990)

- Born: 16 August 1990 (age 36) Sofia, Bulgaria
- Height: 5 ft 6 in (168 cm)

Gymnastics career
- Discipline: Men's artistic gymnastics
- Country represented: Bulgaria (2007–2011, 2023–2025)
- Former countries represented: United States (2013–2018, 2021)
- College team: Stanford Cardinal (2010–2013)
- Retired: January 20, 2026
Medal record
Men's artistic gymnastics
Representing the United States
Pan American Championships
Gold medal – first place	2014 Mississauga	Team
Pacific Rim Championships
Gold medal – first place	2016 Everett	Team
Gold medal – first place	2016 Everett	Vault
Silver medal – second place	2016 Everett	Floor exercise
FIG World Cup
Event	1st	2nd	3rd
World Challenge Cup	3	0	0
Representing Bulgaria
FIG World Cup
Event	1st	2nd	3rd
World Cup	0	0	1
World Challenge Cup	3	1	2
Total	3	1	3

Eddie Penev (born 16 August 1990) is a Bulgarian former artistic gymnast. He was a member of the United States national team where he was part of the gold medal-winning teams at the 2014 Pan American Championships and the 2016 Pacific Rim Championships. He competed in NCAA gymnastics for the Stanford Cardinal, where he was a three-time individual NCAA champion.

== Early life ==
Penev was born in Sofia, Bulgaria, to Youlia Coss (née Hristova) and Marian Penev, both of whom were former members of the Bulgarian national gymnastics team. His family moved to the United States when Penev was three years old. He is the older brother of Kevin Penev.

== Gymnastics career ==
=== 2007–2011: Representing Bulgaria ===
Penev began representing Bulgaria in international competition in 2007. He competed at the 2007 World Championships but did not qualify for any event finals. At the 2009 European Championships, Penev finished eighth on floor exercise. At the 2010 World Championships, Penev qualified to the floor exercise final, where he finished sixth. At the 2011 World Championships he finished 70th in the all-around and did not qualify for any event finals.

=== 2013–2021: Representing the United States ===
In 2013, Penev officially switched his nationality to represent the United States in international competitions. He competed at the 2013 Winter Cup where he won the vault title. As a result, he was added to the United States national team for the first time. He made his international debut for the United States at the Anadia World Cup where he finished sixth on floor exercise. He competed at his first U.S. National Championships that year where he placed second on vault and was named to the United States national team.

At the 2014 Winter Cup, Penev co-won the event titles on floor exercise and vault. At the Anadia World Challenge Cup, he won gold medals on floor exercise and vault. Penev was named to the team to compete at the 2014 Pan American Championships where he helped the USA win gold. However, while vaulting Penev tore his ACL.

In 2016, Penev competed at the Pacific Rim Championships where he helped the USA win gold as a team. Individually he won gold on vault and silver on floor exercise behind teammate Jake Dalton. Penev competed at the 2016 Olympic Trials where he placed second on floor exercise; however he was not named to the Olympic team.

Penev was selected to compete at the 2017 World Championships, his first World Championships representing the United States. During the qualification round, he finished sixth on floor exercise but did not qualify for the final due to teammates Yul Moldauer and Donnell Whittenburg scoring higher. He was, however, the second reserve for the vault final. During the summer of 2018, Penev suffered his second ACL tear.

In 2021, Penev qualified to compete at the postponed-2020 Olympic Trials; however, while competing at a mock meet at the U.S. Olympic & Paralympic Training Center, Penev tore his ACL for the third time in seven years.

=== 2023–2026: Return to Bulgaria ===
In early 2023, the International Gymnastics Federation approved Penev's nationality change request, allowing him to once again represent Bulgaria in international competition. He immediately competed at various World Cups, winning gold medals on floor exercise in Varna and Osijek, and winning silver in Szombathely.

In 2024, Penev attempted to qualify for the Olympic Games via the World Cup circuit. He won bronze on floor exercise in Cairo and placed fourth in Baku. However, he had to withdraw from the Doha World Cup due to a shoulder injury.

Penev competed at various World Cups in the 2025 season. At the Varna World Challenge Cup, he won gold on floor exercise and bronze on vault.

On January 20, 2026, Penev announced his retirement from competitive gymnastics.

=== NCAA gymnastics career ===
Penev began competing for the Stanford Cardinal in 2010. During his freshman season, he won the NCAA vault title. At the 2012 NCAA Championships, he won the titles on both floor exercise and vault.

Penev was awarded the Nissen-Emery Award in 2013, the highest honor for a senior collegiate gymnast.

== Personal life ==
He is openly gay.

== Competitive history ==
Competitive history of Eddie Penev representing Bulgaria
Year	Event	Team	AA	FX	PH	SR	VT	PB	HB
2007
2007	World Championships			90					
2009
2009	European Championships			8					
2010	NCAA Championships	2nd place, silver medalist(s)		2nd place, silver medalist(s)			1st place, gold medalist(s)		
2010	World Championships			6					
2011	NCAA Championships	1st place, gold medalist(s)		5					
2011	World Championships		70						
2012	NCAA Championships	5		1st place, gold medalist(s)			1st place, gold medalist(s)		
2023	Varna World Challenge Cup			1st place, gold medalist(s)					6
2023	Osijek World Challenge Cup			1st place, gold medalist(s)			5		
2023	Mersin World Challenge Cup			7					
2023	Szombathely World Challenge Cup			2nd place, silver medalist(s)			8		
2024	Cairo World Cup			3rd place, bronze medalist(s)					
2024	Cottbus World Cup			17					
2024	Baku World Cup			4					
2025	Baku World Cup			5			5		
2025	Osijek World Cup			6					
2025	Varna World Challenge Cup			1st place, gold medalist(s)			3rd place, bronze medalist(s)		
2025	European Championships			R2					
2025	Szombathely World Challenge Cup						3rd place, bronze medalist(s)		
2025	World Championships			32			48		

Competitive history of Eddie Penev representing the United States
Year	Event	Team	AA	FX	PH	SR	VT	PB	HB
2013	Winter Cup		4	7	15	8	1st place, gold medalist(s)	13	13
2013	NCAA Championships	3rd place, bronze medalist(s)	3rd place, bronze medalist(s)	2nd place, silver medalist(s)			7		
2013	Anadia Challenge Cup			6					
2013	U.S. National Championships		12	8	21	21	1st place, gold medalist(s)	22	10
2014	Winter Cup			1st place, gold medalist(s)			1st place, gold medalist(s)	12	14
2014	Anadia Challenge Cup			1st place, gold medalist(s)			1st place, gold medalist(s)		
2014	U.S. National Championships		18	2nd place, silver medalist(s)	25	30	3rd place, bronze medalist(s)	29	30
2014	Pan American Championships	1st place, gold medalist(s)							
2015	U.S. National Championships		14	4	13	34	5	12	16
2015	Toyota International			3rd place, bronze medalist(s)	5		3rd place, bronze medalist(s)		
2016	Winter Cup			1st place, gold medalist(s)	15		1st place, gold medalist(s)		
2016	University of Calgary International Cup	1st place, gold medalist(s)		1st place, gold medalist(s)			1st place, gold medalist(s)		
2016	Pacific Rim Championships	1st place, gold medalist(s)		2nd place, silver medalist(s)			1st place, gold medalist(s)		
2016	U.S. National Championships		13	3rd place, bronze medalist(s)	16	28	19	20	16
2016	Olympic Trials			2nd place, silver medalist(s)	11		7	15	11
2017	Winter Cup			1st place, gold medalist(s)	13		10	14	25
2017	Koper World Challenge Cup			1st place, gold medalist(s)			4		
2017	U.S. National Championships			1st place, gold medalist(s)			1st place, gold medalist(s)		
2017	World Championships						R2		
2019	Winter Cup			7	9		4	20	16
2019	U.S. National Championships			21			4		
2020	Winter Cup			5			2nd place, silver medalist(s)		
2021	Winter Cup			2nd place, silver medalist(s)			1st place, gold medalist(s)		
2021	U.S. National Championships			1st place, gold medalist(s)			2nd place, silver medalist(s)		
2021	Olympic Trials		WD						
