= Sam Mikulak =

American artistic gymnastics coach

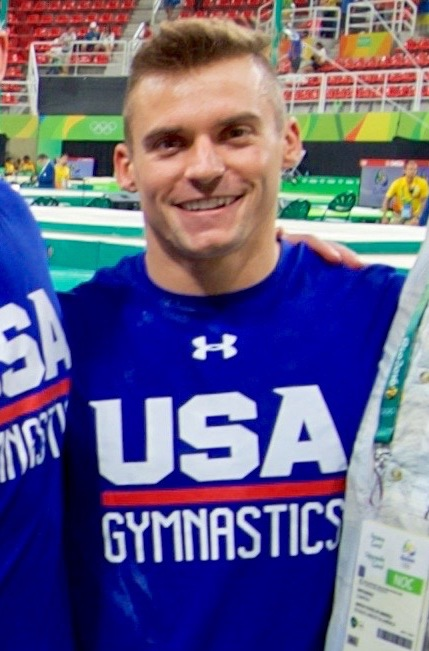
- Mikulak at the 2016 Summer Olympics

Personal information
- Full name: Samuel Anthony Mikulak
- Born: October 13, 1992 (age 34) Huntington Beach, California, U.S.
- Height: 165 cm (5 ft 5 in)

Gymnastics career
- Discipline: Men's artistic gymnastics
- Country represented: United States; (2011–2021)
- College team: Michigan Wolverines
- Gym: USOTC; Team Hilton; SCATS Gymnastics
- Head coach: Vitaliy Marinich
- Former coach: Kurt Golder
- Eponymous skills: Mikulak (pommel horse)
- Retired: August 9, 2021
- Awards: Nissen-Emery Award (2014); Longines Prize for Elegance (2019)
Medal record
Men's artistic gymnastics
Representing United States
Event	1st	2nd	3rd
World Championships	0	0	2
Pan American Games	2	0	2
Pacific Rim Championships	6	6	3
Total	8	6	7
World Championships
Bronze medal – third place	2014 Nanning	Team
Bronze medal – third place	2018 Doha	Horizontal bar
Pan American Games
Gold medal – first place	2015 Toronto	Team
Gold medal – first place	2015 Toronto	All-around
Bronze medal – third place	2015 Toronto	Floor
Bronze medal – third place	2015 Toronto	Parallel bars
Pacific Rim Championships
Gold medal – first place	2012 Everett	Team
Gold medal – first place	2016 Everett	Team
Gold medal – first place	2018 Medellín	Team
Gold medal – first place	2018 Medellín	All-around
Gold medal – first place	2018 Medellín	Rings
Gold medal – first place	2018 Medellín	Horizontal bar
Silver medal – second place	2012 Everett	All-around
Silver medal – second place	2012 Everett	Vault
Silver medal – second place	2012 Everett	Horizontal bar
Silver medal – second place	2016 Everett	Pommel horse
Silver medal – second place	2018 Medellín	Floor
Silver medal – second place	2018 Medellín	Parallel bars
Bronze medal – third place	2012 Everett	Pommel horse
Bronze medal – third place	2012 Everett	Parallel bars
Bronze medal – third place	2016 Everett	All-around

Samuel Anthony Mikulak (born October 13, 1992) is an American gymnastics coach. A retired artistic gymnast, he was a member of the United States men's national artistic gymnastics team. He is a six-time U.S. national all-around champion (2013–2016, 2018–2019), the 2018 World bronze medalist on the horizontal bar, and a three-time Olympian (2012, 2016, and 2020). He is also an eight-time NCAA champion, winning the team, individual all-around, and several individual event titles at the 2011, 2013, and 2014 NCAA Men's Gymnastics championships. In 2023, he started serving as a gymnastics coach at EVO Gymnastics.

== Early life and education ==
Mikulak was born in Huntington Beach, California, and attended Corona del Mar High School. He is of Polish descent. His parents both competed in gymnastics at the University of California, Berkeley and started Sam in gymnastics at age two. He has a younger sister who also started gymnastics at age two, but stopped at a young age. His father, Stephen Mikulak, is an orthopedic surgeon. He enrolled at the University of Michigan to pursue gymnastics.

== Gymnastics career ==
=== Youth ===
Mikulak attended SCATS Gymnastics and was a United States Junior National team member from 2007 to 2010. He won the all-around, floor exercise, and vault titles at the 2010 Junior Olympic Nationals.

As a Junior Elite gymnast, Mikulak won the silver medal in the all-around three years in a row in the 14–15-year-old division at the 2007, 2008, and 2009 U.S. National Championships. He was runner-up to John Orozco all three years. At the 2010 U.S. National Championships, Mikulak won the Junior national all-around title in the 16–18-year-old division. He also won the gold medal on pommel horse, parallel bars, and horizontal bar.

=== University of Michigan ===
Mikulak was a member of the Michigan Wolverines men's gymnastics team from 2010 to 2014. He led Michigan to the NCAA team title in 2013 and 2014 as the team's anchor. As a freshman at the 2011 NCAA Men's Gymnastics Championships, he won the all-around title with a career-high score of 90.75. As a sophomore in 2012, he won the Big Ten Conference title on the horizontal bar and pommel horse and placed second in the all-around. Later that year, Mikulak became the first male gymnast from the University of Michigan to qualify for the Olympics. At the 2013 NCAA Championships, Mikulak won the all-around, parallel bars, and horizontal bar titles. At the 2014 NCAA Championships, he won the all-around and parallel bars titles. He was named undergraduate assistant coach for the University of Michigan men's team in August 2014.

=== Senior ===
==== 2012: First Olympics ====
At the 2012 U.S. National Championships, Mikulak won the bronze medal in the all-around and the silver medal in the parallel bars event. At the 2012 U.S. Olympic Trials, he was unable to compete in five of the six events on Day 2 after spraining his ankle while competing on vault on the first night of competition. Despite the injury, Mikulak was selected for the five-man Olympic gymnastics team. He was the first male gymnast from the University of Michigan to be named to the U.S. Olympic team.

At the 2012 Olympics in London, Mikulak placed 5th with the U.S. team in the team competition. The U.S. team had placed 1st in the qualification round. Mikulak competed in the vault final, placing 5th. His Michigan teammate Syque Caesar also competed in the 2012 Summer Olympics, representing Bangladesh.

==== 2013: First national title ====
Mikulak won his first national all-around title at the 2013 U.S. National Championships in Hartford, Connecticut. He also won the gold medal on the parallel bars and horizontal bar. He then competed at the 2013 World Championships and placed 6th in the all-around final and 4th in the individual horizontal bar final.

==== 2014: Second national title ====
In March 2014 at the American Cup in Greensboro, North Carolina, Mikulak won the all-around title. In August, Mikulak won his second national all-around title at the 2014 U.S. National Championships in Pittsburgh, Pennsylvania. He also won the gold medal on the pommel horse and the silver medal on the horizontal bar. He then competed at the 2014 World Championships in Nanning, China. He won a bronze medal with the U.S. team in the team competition and placed 12th in the all-around final.

==== 2015: Third national title ====
In March, Mikulak, along with Simone Biles, MyKayla Skinner, and Donnell Whittenburg, represented the U.S. against a strong international field at the 2015 AT&T American Cup at AT&T Stadium in Arlington, Texas. Mikulak finished fourth in the individual all-around event.

On July 11, 2015, Mikulak led the U.S. men's gymnastics team to their first gold medal at the Pan-American Games in twenty years. He was crowned Pan American champion in the all-around final two days later.

On August 16, 2015, Mikulak won his third consecutive national all-around title at the 2015 U.S. National Championships in Indianapolis. He also won the gold medal on vault and parallel bars and won the bronze medal on pommel horse and horizontal bar. Due to a partially torn Achilles tendon injury, he was unable to participate at the 2015 World Championships in Glasgow, Scotland.

On December 17, 2015, Mikulak and two-time World medalist Donnell Whittenburg accepted invitations to represent the U.S. at the 2016 American Cup in Newark, New Jersey, on March 5, 2016.

==== 2016: Fourth national title and second Olympics ====
On February 21, 2016, Mikulak won the all-around title at the 2016 Winter Cup in Las Vegas, with a two-day score of 177.50. He outscored the second-place finisher, Akash Modi, by over two points. In March, Mikulak finished fourth at the American Cup, his first international competition since recovering from a torn Achilles tendon. In April, he competed at the 2016 Pacific Rim Championships and won the gold medal with the U.S. team in the team event. He also won the bronze medal in the all-around and the silver medal on the pommel horse.

Mikulak claimed his fourth consecutive national all-around title on June 5, 2016, at the 2016 U.S. National Championships in Hartford, Connecticut. He outscored Chris Brooks 181.500 to 179.850 to become the first male gymnast to win four consecutive national titles since Blaine Wilson won five titles in a row from 1996 to 2000.

On June 25, 2016, Mikulak placed first at the 2016 U.S. Olympic Trials in St. Louis, Missouri, and qualified for his second Olympic team. He was named to the five-man U.S. Olympic men's gymnastics team along with Chris Brooks, John Orozco (who was replaced by Danell Leyva due to injury), Jake Dalton, and Alex Naddour. Mikulak was one of three gymnasts who train at the U.S. Olympic Training Center in Colorado Springs, Colorado, to qualify for the Olympic men's gymnastics team.

At the 2016 Olympics in Rio de Janeiro, Brazil, Mikulak placed fifth with the U.S. team in the team competition. He placed seventh in the all-around final and fourth in the horizontal bar final. The U.S. men's team had placed second in the qualification round.

==== 2017 ====
In August, Mikulak only competed in two events at the 2017 U.S. National Championships in Anaheim, California, and maintained his spot on the U.S. national team. His streak of four U.S. national all-around titles was snapped, as he was still recovering from an Achilles tendon injury suffered in February at the Winter Cup. He won the silver medal on the pommel horse and the bronze medal on the horizontal bar. In October, he competed only on the horizontal bar at the 2017 World Championships in Montreal, Canada, as he was still not fully back from his injury. His quest to capture an individual medal ended when he fell on the horizontal bar during the qualification round. As Mikulak was recovering from injury, he continued to host and participate in numerous clinics and workshops for aspiring gymnasts.

==== 2018: Fifth national title and first world individual event medal ====
In February, Mikulak won the gold medal in the all-around at the 2018 Winter Cup in Las Vegas. He also placed first on the floor exercise, parallel bars, and horizontal bar. Following the Winter Cup, the top six all-around gymnasts, including Mikulak, automatically qualified for the 2018 U.S. national team. In April, he competed at the 2018 Pacific Rim Championships and won the gold medal with the U.S. team and the all-around title. He also won the gold medal on rings and horizontal bar, and won the silver medal on floor exercise and parallel bars.

In August, Mikulak won his fifth national all-around title at the 2018 U.S. National Championships in Boston. After a somewhat shaky performance on Day 1 that included falls on the pommel horse and horizontal bar, he came back with a very strong outing on Day 2 and won the gold medal easily. His margin of victory was the largest of any of his national titles at the time (he would extend this record in 2019). He also won the gold medal on floor exercise, parallel bars, and horizontal bar. Mikulak is the first male gymnast to win five U.S. national titles since Blaine Wilson won five straight crowns from 1996 to 2000.

In October, Mikulak competed at the 2018 World Championships in Doha, Qatar. He and the U.S. team finished fourth in the team competition. He qualified for the individual all-around final in third place, and also for four event finals. Mikulak is the first U.S. man since Kurt Thomas in 1979 to qualify for that many event finals at one World Championships. In the individual all-around final, he had strong competition and was in third place heading into the last event, horizontal bar, where a costly error left him in fifth place. This result was the best finish at Worlds by a U.S. man since 2011. In the individual event finals, Mikulak broke through and won his first World individual event medal, a bronze on horizontal bar. Before the horizontal bar final, he had placed seventh on floor exercise, and fourth on pommel horse and parallel bars.

==== 2019: Sixth national title ====
In February, Mikulak placed first on floor and horizontal bars, and second on parallel bars and all-around at the 2019 Winter Cup.

In March, Mikulak placed second in the all-around at the 2019 American Cup, an FIG All-Around World Cup event, just 0.001 of a point behind fellow American and the event's two-time defending champion Yul Moldauer.

In April, Mikulak competed at the 2019 FIG All-Around World Cup in Tokyo, Japan, an individual all-around-only event in which he was the defending bronze medalist. He went on to win the all-around gold medal with a score of 86.599 ahead of the defending gold and silver medalists from Japan— Kenzō Shirai (82.964), who won the bronze medal while still recovering from injury, and Wataru Tanigawa (85.665), who successfully defended his silver medal.

In August, Mikulak competed at the 2019 U.S. National Championships. He won his record-breaking sixth all-around title, as well as gold medals on floor exercise, pommel horse, parallel bars, and horizontal bar. His margin of victory in the all-around was the largest of any of his national titles.

In Summer 2020, Mikulak announced he was in his final full year of competition, culminating, he hopes, with representing the United States at the 2021 Summer Olympic Games in Tokyo.

==== 2020 ====
At the 2020 Winter Cup in Las Vegas, Nevada, Mikulak finished first in all-around and parallel bars, second on floor and horizontal bar, and third on pommel horse.

==== 2021: Third Olympics ====
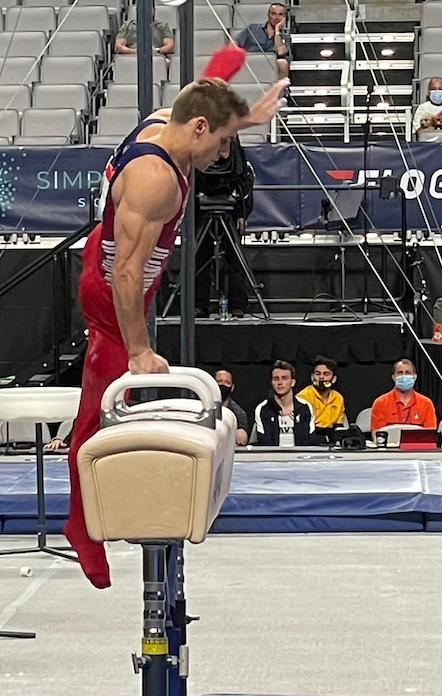
Mikulak at the 2021 National Championships

At the 2021 U.S. Gymnastics Championships in Fort Worth, Texas, Mikulak finished first on the horizontal bar, third all-around, sixth on parallel bars, and eighth on floor and still rings. At the Olympic Trials, he finished fourth in the all-around, first on floor exercise, and second on horizontal bar. As a result, Mikulak was chosen by the selection committee to represent the United States at the 2020 Summer Olympics alongside Brody Malone, Yul Moldauer, and Shane Wiskus.

In 2021, Mikulak started speaking out about his experiences with mental illness as an athlete. In May, he spoke at a USA Gymnastics athlete-driven panel about mental health. Mikulak described feeling overwhelmed by his focus on gymnastics during the 2016 Olympics cycle, including during the Olympic Floor Exercise finals. He had posted the highest qualifying score in the field, but he did not win a medal in the event finals, even though several other contenders had made errors. Mikulak also described his struggles with depression after the postponement of the 2020 Summer Olympics. Mikulak called the 2020 games the most "meaningful" and the "hardest" Olympics to qualify for in his career. He spoke about redefining his identity beyond only being a gymnast.

In 2021, Mikulak was honored with the National Polish-American Sports Hall of Fame Excellence in Sports Award for the year 2020, in Troy, Michigan.

== Coaching career ==
In 2023, Mikulak joined EVO Gymnastics as a coach. He coached pommel horse specialist Stephen Nedoroscik in the 2024 Summer Olympics where Nedoroscik won two bronze medals, one with the team and one for pommel horse.

== Eponymous skills ==
Mikulak has one named element on the pommel horse.

Gymnastics elements named after Sam Mikulak
Apparatus	Name	Description	Difficulty (Note: Valid for the 2025–2028 Code of Points)	Added to Code of Points
Pommel horse	Mikulak	"Double scissor forward sideways from one end to the other (3/3)."	D, 0.4	2013

== Competitive history ==
Competitive history of Sam Mikulak
Year	Event	Team	AA	FX	PH	SR	VT	PB	HB
2012	Winter Cup				27		7	2nd place, silver medalist(s)	7
2012	NCAA Championships	6	2nd place, silver medalist(s)					8	1st place, gold medalist(s)
2012	Pacific Rim Championships	1st place, gold medalist(s)	2nd place, silver medalist(s)		3rd place, bronze medalist(s)		2nd place, silver medalist(s)	3rd place, bronze medalist(s)	2nd place, silver medalist(s)
2012	U.S. National Championships		3rd place, bronze medalist(s)	13	5	10	4	2nd place, silver medalist(s)	5
2012	Olympic Trials				5				
2012	Olympic Games	5					5		
2013	NCAA Championships	1st place, gold medalist(s)	1st place, gold medalist(s)	3rd place, bronze medalist(s)	4		7	1st place, gold medalist(s)	1st place, gold medalist(s)
2013	Anadia Challenge Cup			3rd place, bronze medalist(s)			7	4	1st place, gold medalist(s)
2013	U.S. National Championships		1st place, gold medalist(s)	5	10	9	5	1st place, gold medalist(s)	1st place, gold medalist(s)
2013	World Championships	—N/a	6						4
2014	American Cup		1st place, gold medalist(s)						
2014	NCAA Championships	1st place, gold medalist(s)	1st place, gold medalist(s)	4			8	1st place, gold medalist(s)	
2014	Anadia Challenge Cup			2nd place, silver medalist(s)			5	3rd place, bronze medalist(s)	1st place, gold medalist(s)
2014	U.S. National Championships		1st place, gold medalist(s)	6	1st place, gold medalist(s)	9	11	10	2nd place, silver medalist(s)
2014	World Championships	3rd place, bronze medalist(s)	12						
2015	Winter Cup				6			8	12
2015	American Cup		4						
2015	Pan American Games	1st place, gold medalist(s)	1st place, gold medalist(s)	3rd place, bronze medalist(s)	5			3rd place, bronze medalist(s)	6
2015	U.S. National Championships		1st place, gold medalist(s)	7	3rd place, bronze medalist(s)	5	1st place, gold medalist(s)	1st place, gold medalist(s)	3rd place, bronze medalist(s)
2016	Winter Cup		1st place, gold medalist(s)	11	1st place, gold medalist(s)	11	12	9	1st place, gold medalist(s)
2016	American Cup		4						
2016	Pacific Rim Championships	1st place, gold medalist(s)	3rd place, bronze medalist(s)		2nd place, silver medalist(s)				
2016	U.S. National Championships		1st place, gold medalist(s)	20	2nd place, silver medalist(s)	6	8	2nd place, silver medalist(s)	4
2016	Olympic Trials		1st place, gold medalist(s)	7	1st place, gold medalist(s)	6	3rd place, bronze medalist(s)	4	7
2016	Olympic Games	5	7	8					4
2017	U.S. National Championships				2nd place, silver medalist(s)				3rd place, bronze medalist(s)
2018	Winter Cup		1st place, gold medalist(s)	1st place, gold medalist(s)	2nd place, silver medalist(s)	9	18	1st place, gold medalist(s)	1st place, gold medalist(s)
2018	Tokyo Cup		3rd place, bronze medalist(s)						
2018	Pacific Rim Championships	1st place, gold medalist(s)	1st place, gold medalist(s)	2nd place, silver medalist(s)	5	1st place, gold medalist(s)		2nd place, silver medalist(s)	1st place, gold medalist(s)
2018	U.S. Championships		1st place, gold medalist(s)	1st place, gold medalist(s)	4	4	5	1st place, gold medalist(s)	1st place, gold medalist(s)
2018	World team trials		1st place, gold medalist(s)						
2018	World Championships	4	5	7	4			4	3rd place, bronze medalist(s)
2019	Winter Cup		2nd place, silver medalist(s)	1st place, gold medalist(s)	2nd place, silver medalist(s)	3rd place, bronze medalist(s)	18	2nd place, silver medalist(s)	1st place, gold medalist(s)
2019	American Cup		2nd place, silver medalist(s)						
2019	Tokyo Cup		1st place, gold medalist(s)						
2019	U.S. National Championships		1st place, gold medalist(s)	1st place, gold medalist(s)	1st place, gold medalist(s)	4	17	1st place, gold medalist(s)	1st place, gold medalist(s)
2019	World team trials		1st place, gold medalist(s)						
2019	World Championships	4	7						5
2020	Winter Cup		1st place, gold medalist(s)	2nd place, silver medalist(s)	3rd place, bronze medalist(s)			1st place, gold medalist(s)	2nd place, silver medalist(s)
2020	American Cup		1st place, gold medalist(s)						
2021	U.S. National Championships		3rd place, bronze medalist(s)	8	17	8	11	6	1st place, gold medalist(s)
2021	Olympic Trials		4	1st place, gold medalist(s)	13	12	11	9	2nd place, silver medalist(s)
2021	Olympic Games	5	12					5	
