= 2014 Winter Cup =

Artistic gymnastics competition in the USA

- Venue: Riviera
- Location: Las Vegas, Nevada, U.S.
- Dates: February 20—February 22, 2014

The 2014 Winter Cup was an artistic gymnastics competition held at the Riviera in Las Vegas from February 20 to February 22, 2014.

== Competition ==
The finals session featured the top 42 gymnasts according to their all-around ranking and the top three gymnasts on each apparatus. The all-around and individual event champions were determined via a combined two-day score. Performances at the Winter Cup helped determine eight men who comprised the United States men's national gymnastics team at the 2014 U.S. National Gymnastics Championships.

== Medalists ==
Event	Gold	Silver	Bronze
Senior Men
Individual all-around	Chris Brooks	Donnell Whittenburg	Sean Melton
Floor	Eddie Penev Alec Robin	—N/a	CJ Maestas
Pommel horse	Craig Hernandez	Ellis Mannon	Allan Bower
Rings	Brandon Wynn	Donnell Whittenburg	CJ Maestas
Vault	Chandler Eggleston Eddie Penev	—N/a	Joshua Dixon
Parallel bars	Akash Modi	Danell Leyva	Adrian de los Angeles
Horizontal bar	John Orozco	Chris Brooks	Sean Melton
