= 2012 Winter Cup =

Artistic gymnastics competition in the USA

- Venue: Las Vegas Sports Center
- Location: Las Vegas, Nevada, U.S.
- Dates: February 2—February 4, 2012

The 2012 Winter Cup was an artistic gymnastics competition held at the Las Vegas Sports Center in Las Vegas from February 2 to February 4, 2012.

== Competition ==
The finals session featured the top 42 gymnasts according to their all-around ranking and the top three gymnasts on each apparatus. The all-around and individual event champions were determined via a combined two-day score. Performances at the Winter Cup helped determine eight men who comprised the United States men's national gymnastics team at the 2012 U.S. National Gymnastics Championships.

== Medalists ==
Event	Gold	Silver	Bronze
Senior Men
Individual all-around	John Orozco	Steven Legendre	Brandon Wynn
Floor	Steven Legendre	Danell Leyva	Paul Ruggeri
Pommel horse	Glen Ishino	John Orozco	Ty Echard
Rings	Brandon Wynn	Christopher Maestas	David Sender
Vault	Steven Legendre	Chandler Eggleston; David Sender	
Parallel bars	John Orozco	Sam Mikulak	Brandon Wynn
Horizontal bar	Danell Leyva; John Orozco		Chris Brooks
