= Gymnastics at the 2016 Summer Olympics – Women's uneven bars =

Women's uneven bars at the Games of the XXXI Olympiad
- Venue: Rio's Olympic Arena
- Date: 14 August 2016
- Competitors: 12 from 7 nations
- Winning score: 15.900

Medalists
1st place, gold medalist(s)		Aliya Mustafina	Russia
2nd place, silver medalist(s)		Madison Kocian	United States
3rd place, bronze medalist(s)		Sophie Scheder	Germany

The women's uneven bars competition at the 2016 Summer Olympics was held on 14 August at the Rio's Olympic Arena.

The medals were presented by Alexander Zhukov, IOC member representing Russia, and Alejandro Peniche, FIG Executive Committee Member.

== Competition format ==
The top 8 qualifiers in the qualification phase (limit two per NOC), based on combined score of each apparatus, advanced to the individual all-around final. The finalists performed on each apparatus again. Qualification scores were then ignored, with only final round scores counting.

== Qualification ==
The gymnasts who ranked top eight qualified for final round. In case of there were more than two gymnasts in same NOC, the last ranked among them would not qualify to final round. The next best ranked gymnast would qualify instead.

Rank	Gymnast	Nation	D Score	E Score	Pen.	Total	Qual.
1	Madison Kocian	United States	6.700	9.166		15.866	Q
2	Aliya Mustafina	Russia	6.800	9.033		15.833	Q
3	Gabby Douglas	United States	6.500	9.266		15.766	Q
4	Daria Spiridonova	Russia	6.700	8.983		15.683	Q
5	Elisabeth Seitz	Germany	6.600	8.866		15.466	Q
6	Sophie Scheder	Germany	6.600	8.833		15.433	Q
7	Jessica López	Venezuela	6.400	8.933		15.333	Q
8	Shang Chunsong	China	6.700	8.600		15.300	Q
9	Fan Yilin	China	6.900	8.366		15.266	R
10	Becky Downie	Great Britain	6.800	8.433		15.233	R
11	Seda Tutkhalyan	Russia	6.500	8.633		15.133	–
12	Nina Derwael	Belgium	6.600	8.533		15.133	R

== Final ==
Rank	Gymnast	D score	E score	Pen.	Total
1st place, gold medalist(s)	Aliya Mustafina (RUS)	6.800	9.100		15.900
2nd place, silver medalist(s)	Madison Kocian (USA)	6.700	9.133		15.833
3rd place, bronze medalist(s)	Sophie Scheder (GER)	6.600	8.966		15.566
4	Elisabeth Seitz (GER)	6.600	8.933		15.533
5	Shang Chunsong (CHN)	6.700	8.733		15.433
6	Jessica López (VEN)	6.700	8.633		15.333
7	Gabby Douglas (USA)	6.500	8.566		15.066
8	Daria Spiridonova (RUS)	6.100	7.866		13.966
