= Chris Brooks (gymnast) =

American gymnast (born 1986)

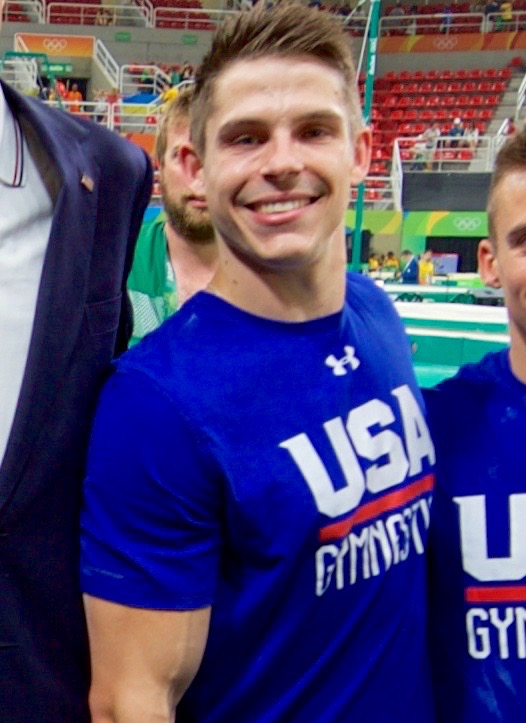
- Brooks at the 2016 Summer Olympics

Personal information
- Full name: Christopher Dean Brooks
- Nickname: Hulk
- Born: December 19, 1986 (age 39) Houston, Texas, U.S.
- Height: 5 ft 8 in (173 cm)
- Spouse: Jordyn Wieber (m. 2023)

Gymnastics career
- Discipline: Men's artistic gymnastics
- Country represented: United States; (2009–2017)
- College team: Oklahoma Sooners
- Gym: USOTC; Team Hilton HHonors; Cypress Academy
- Former coach: Mark Williams
- Retired: August 16, 2017
Medal record
Men's artistic gymnastics
Representing United States
Event	1st	2nd	3rd
Pacific Rim Championships	5	1	0
Total	5	1	0
Pacific Rim Championships
Gold medal – first place	2012 Everett	Team
Gold medal – first place	2012 Everett	All-around
Gold medal – first place	2012 Everett	Rings
Gold medal – first place	2012 Everett	Horizontal bar
Gold medal – first place	2014 Richmond	Team
Silver medal – second place	2012 Everett	Pommel horse
- Coaching career

Current position
- Title: Head coach
- Team: Arkansas Razorbacks
- Conference: Southeastern Conference

Coaching career (HC unless noted)
- 2017: Nebraska women's (Asst.)
- 2018: Oklahoma men's (Asst.)
- 2019–2026: Arkansas women's (Asst.)
- 2027–present: Arkansas women's

Christopher Dean Brooks (born December 19, 1986, in Houston, Texas) is a retired American gymnast who represented the United States at the 2016 Summer Olympic Games. He is currently the head coach of the Arkansas Razorbacks NCAA gymnastics team. He was a member of the United States men's national artistic gymnastics team and won four gold medals at the 2012 Pacific Rim Championships. He has trained alongside Olympic and World Championships medalist Jonathan Horton as a junior, college, and senior elite gymnast. On August 17, 2017, he announced his retirement from artistic gymnastics.

== Early life and education ==
Brooks was a highly-ranked junior gymnast in high school, where he trained at Houston North Gymnastics Club, under coach Bill Foster. He was a U.S. junior national team member from 1999–2001 and again from 2002–2005. In 2003, he was a gold medalist at the USA national championships. In 2004, he suffered a serious injury when his grip locked while training on horizontal bar, resulting in shattering and splintering of the ulna and radius of his right arm. He attended Cypress Creek High School before enrolling at the University of Oklahoma to pursue gymnastics.

== Gymnastics career ==
=== Collegiate ===
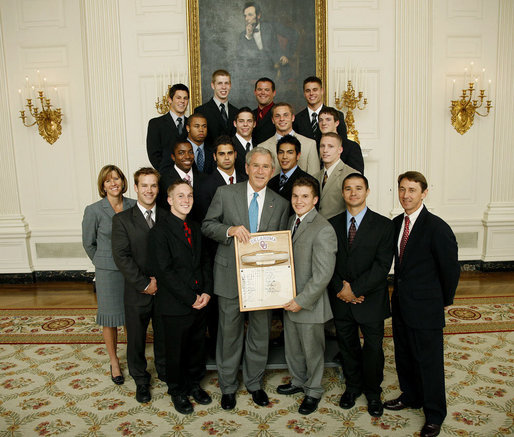
The 2008 Sooners national gymanstics championship team. Brooks is second from the left in the row second from the top.

He was a member of the Oklahoma Sooners men's gymnastics team in college from 2005 to 2009. The team were national champions in 2006 and 2008. Brooks was a multi-year, multi-event All-American, and in 2009, was captain of the Sooners men's gymnastics team.

=== Senior ===
He returned to elite gymnastics in 2008 when he competed in the US national championships in Houston, Texas. He made a huge comeback at the beginning of 2009 at the Winter Cup coming 5th all-around, 4th on horizontal bar, and winning a bronze medal on floor exercise. Due to injury, he couldn't fully compete at the 2009 USA nationals and did not make the national team that year.

After graduating from the University of Oklahoma he returned to Houston to train at Cypress Academy of Gymnastics under coach Tom Meadows, with American teammate Jonathan Horton.

In 2010, he won gold in the all-around and horizontal bar with a bronze on the vault at the Winter Cup. He went on to compete at the American Cup where he won bronze in the all-around behind teammate Jonathan Horton and Russian Maxim Devyatovskiy beating the world silver medalist, Daniel Keatings. He competed in the Japan Cup in July helping the USA men's team to a bronze medal finish. Later in the summer, he competed fully in the US national championships in Hartford, Connecticut, where he won a gold medal on horizontal bar and silver on parallel bars securing a place on the senior national team. He went on to represent the US at the 2010 World Artistic Gymnastics Championships in Rotterdam where he helped the team to a 4th-place finish, and 6th-place finish in the horizontal bar final. After the world championships, he had to have surgeries on his ankles and wrist.

In 2011, he was chosen to be a member of the team Hilton HHonors, a group of male gymnasts sponsored by Hilton Worldwide. He competed in the USA national championships where he won a silver medal on the horizontal bar and bronze on parallel bars. He was chosen to be an alternate for the team representing the United States at the 2011 World Artistic Gymnastics Championships in Tokyo where they won the first men's team world medal for the US, since 2003.

In February 2012, he competed at the Winter Cup and won bronze on the horizontal bar. On March 12, he had an outstanding performance at the Pacific Rim championships, in Everett, Washington, where he led the team to gold. He went on to win 3 more individual golds as well. At the Visa championships, he showed some inconsistency in his routines, but great potential with difficult moves on horizontal bar and vault. He went on to compete in the Olympic trials where his combined scores placed him in joint 4th place with Jake Dalton. At the announcement of the men's Olympic team on July 1, he was named as an alternate to the 2012 Summer Olympics team.

In 2014, Brooks won the Winter Cup Challenge all-around competition and was named to the U.S. gymnastics men's senior national team. Later in the year, he was recovering from a hand injury and did not compete in the P&G Championships.

=== 2016 Rio Olympics ===
On June 25, 2016, Brooks was named to the five-man United States men's gymnastics Olympic team. He represented the United States in August 2016, in the 2016 Summer Olympics in Rio de Janeiro, alongside team members Jake Dalton, Sam Mikulak, Alex Naddour, and Danell Leyva. Brooks finished second in the all-around at the U.S. Olympic trials in St. Louis. On August 4, 2016, it was reported by the Houston Chronicle, that Brooks had been named captain of the US men's Olympic gymnastics team. In Rio, Brooks finished 14th in the individual men's all-around competition.

== Personal life ==
Brooks's father, Larry, was also a gymnast which is how he got involved with the sport. Both Brooks' brother and sister have had involvement in gymnastics as well. His father died in a car accident in 2008. After he graduated and trained for an additional year at the University of Oklahoma, his brother, Nick coached him for two years.

As of February 2017, he has been in a relationship with 2012 Olympic gymnast Jordyn Wieber. They announced their engagement on October 5, 2021 and they married on May 28, 2023. On December 18, 2024, the pair announced that they were expecting their first child; their daughter was born in June 2025.
