= Spring Creek Academy =

Private school in Plano, Texas

Location
- Plano, Texas; United States; 33°03′23″N 96°43′53″W

Information
- Type: Private
- Enrollment: 117 (2025–2026)
- Student to teacher ratio: 7:1
- Colors: Navy blue and white
- Nickname: Spartans
- Website: springcreekacademy.com

Spring Creek Academy is a private high school in Plano, Texas, United States, a northern suburb of Dallas. The school serves second through twelfth grade. The school specializes in students who are pursuing professional success in the athletics and arts. Spring Creek Academy is accredited by the SACS AdvancEd Accreditation Commission and the Texas Private School Accreditation Commission.

== Demographics ==
As of 2026, Spring Creek Academy has a student population of 117 that is 13.7% Asian, 13.7% black, 15.4% Hispanic, and 57.3% white. The school's college enrollment rate is 90%. According to the U.S. News & World Report, the tuition to attend Spring Creek Academy is $8,600 per year.

== School structure ==
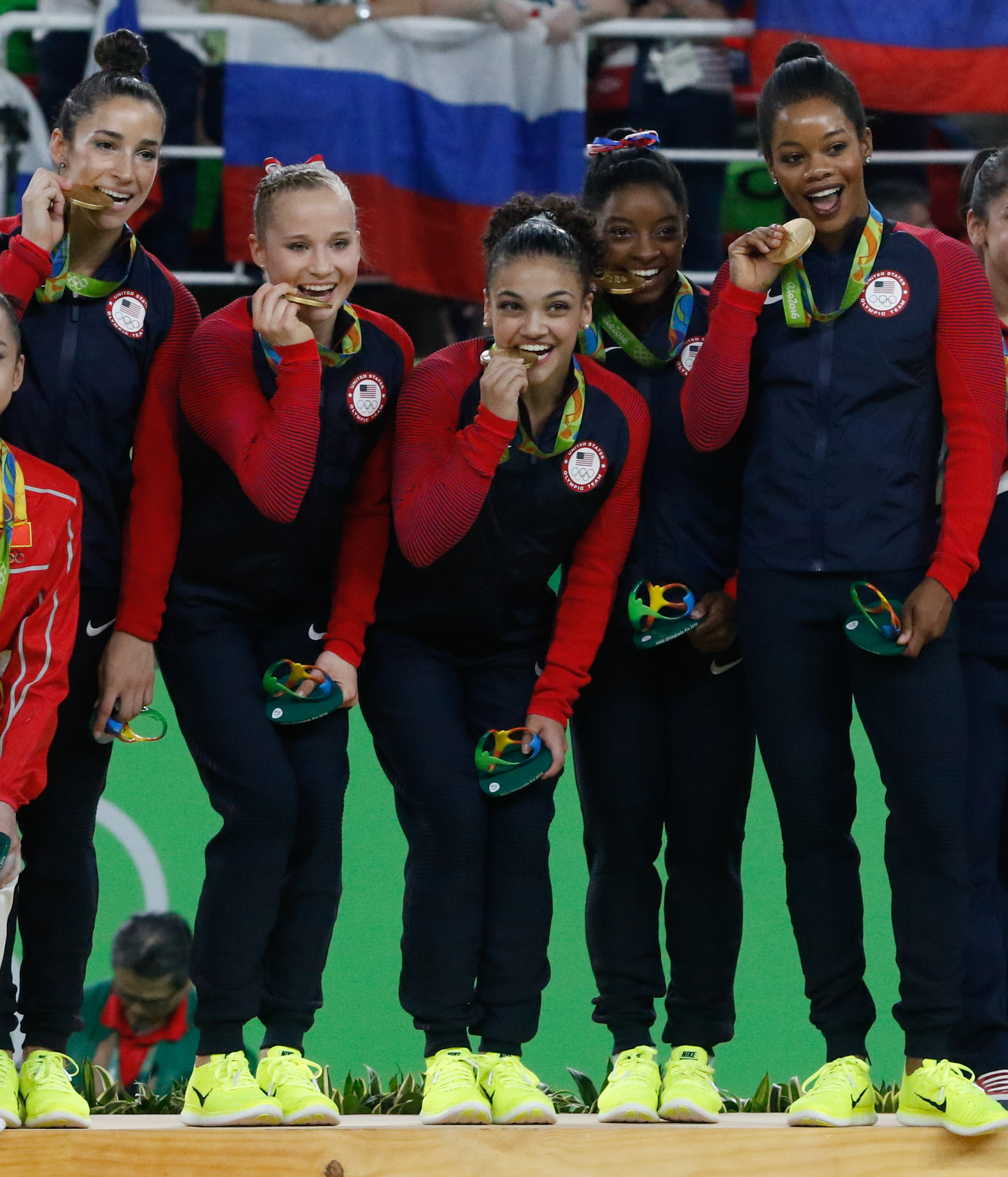
Madison Kocian with the Final Five at the 2016 Rio Olympics

Spring Creek Academy is structured so that students attend class for the first half the day and pursue their chosen vocation for the second half of the day.

Teachers and the school work around the training schedules of the students. In an interview with NBC, Spring Creek social science teacher Charlie Vann described his pride in Olympic medalist and former student Madison Kocian. “I taught her, I think [starting] when she was in third grade,” he stated. “So now to see her with her Olympic medals, it’s really thrilling.”

== Extracurriculars ==
Spring Creek Academy offers clubs and local chapters of national organizations for students to get involved in. Student clubs include the Middle School Student Council, the High School Student Council, the Volunteer Council, the Creative Writing Club, the Journalism club, and Helping Others Protect the Earth (HOPE). Students can participate in the local chapters of the National Association for Gifted Children, the National Honor Society, Private Schools Interscholastic Association (PSIA), and United Nations Children’s Fund (UNICEF).

Students have also competed in the Dallas Morning News Spelling Bee, and attended Duke's former Talent Identification Program.

== Notable alumni ==
- Nikki Washington (2005), professional soccer forward
- Nastia Liukin (2007), Olympic gymnast and five-time medalist
- Madison Kocian (2015), Olympic gymnast, silver medalist, and member of the Final Five
- Misha Mitrofanov (2016), U.S. Nationals ice skating champion
- Carly Patterson, singer and Olympic gymnast
- Mika Abdalla, actress
- Katelyn Ohashi, UCLA gymnast
- Audrey Lu, ice skater and national medalist
