= Jake Dalton =

American gymnast (born 1991)

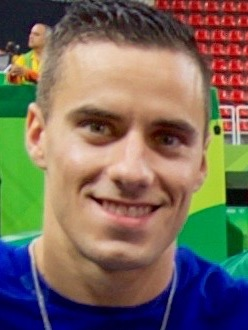
- Dalton at the 2016 Summer Olympics

Personal information
- Full name: Jacob William Dalton
- Born: August 19, 1991 (age 35) Reno, Nevada, U.S.
- Height: 5 ft 6 in (168 cm)

Gymnastics career
- Discipline: Men's artistic gymnastics
- Country represented: United States; (2009–2017)
- College team: Oklahoma Sooners
- Gym: USOTC; Team Hilton HHonors; Gym Nevada
- Head coach: Mark Williams
- Assistant coaches: Rustam Sharipov, Daniel Furney
- Eponymous skills: Dalton (parallel bars)
- Retired: August 9, 2017
Medal record
Men's artistic gymnastics
Representing United States
Event	1st	2nd	3rd
World Championships	0	1	3
Pacific Rim Championships	4	0	0
Pan American Championships	1	0	1
Total	5	1	4
World Championships
Silver medal – second place	2013 Antwerp	Floor
Bronze medal – third place	2011 Tokyo	Team
Bronze medal – third place	2014 Nanning	Team
Bronze medal – third place	2014 Nanning	Vault
Pacific Rim Championships
Gold medal – first place	2012 Everett	Team
Gold medal – first place	2012 Everett	Floor
Gold medal – first place	2016 Everett	Team
Gold medal – first place	2016 Everett	Floor
Pan American Championships
Gold medal – first place	2010 Guadalajara	Team
Bronze medal – third place	2010 Guadalajara	Floor

Jacob William Dalton (born August 19, 1991) is a retired American gymnast who was a member of the Oklahoma Sooners men's gymnastics team and the United States men's national artistic gymnastics team. He represented the United States at the 2012 Summer Olympics in London and 2016 Summer Olympics in Rio de Janeiro.

== Early life and education ==
Dalton was born August 19, 1991, in Reno, Nevada, to Tim and Denise Dalton. He grew up in Sparks, Nevada and attended Spanish Springs High School.

Dailton trained at Gym Nevada under Wanda Fredericks and Andrew Pileggi. After graduating, he received an NCAA scholarship to compete for the University of Oklahoma in 2009 where he earned All-America honors and won the NCAA men's gymnastics floor and vault titles in 2011.

== Gymnastics career ==
Dalton was the U.S. National vault champion in 2009 and 2011, the floor champion in 2011, and the All-Around Gold medalist of the Winter Cup Challenge in 2011.

Dalton was a member of the USA team that won the bronze medal in the 2011 World Artistic Gymnastics Championships in Tokyo, Japan. In February 2013, Dalton competed at the 2013 Winter Cup and won gold on the floor, rings, and all-around. In August 2013, he won the bronze medal at the P&G National Championships en route to making the World Championships team. He went on to win a silver medal in the floor exercise at 2013 World Artistic Gymnastics Championships behind 17-year-old newcomer Kenzo Shirai of Japan. In 2015, Dalton was still recovering from a small shoulder labrum tear and did not compete in the P&G National Championships.

=== 2012 & 2016 Summer Olympics ===
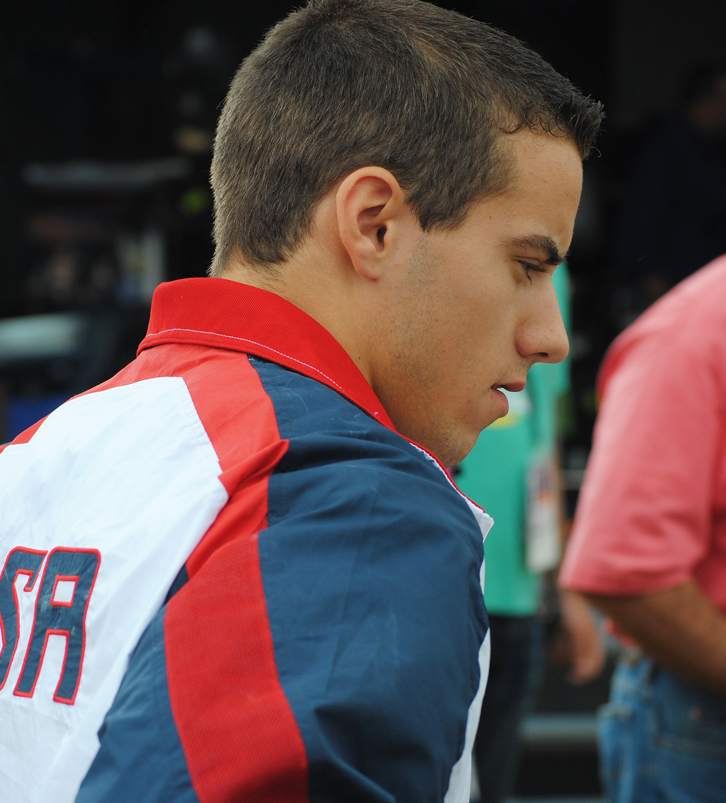
Dalton during the 2012 Olympics

It was announced on July 1, 2012, that Dalton would be a member of the 2012 Olympic team representing the United States. The New York Times stated that the team roster was "considered so good that it could be the first United States men's team to win gold since the 1984 Los Angeles Games." Dalton, as part of the United States Gymnastics team, placed fifth in the team competition in the 2012 Summer Olympics in London.

On June 25, 2016, Dalton was once again named to the five-man United States men's gymnastics team for the Olympics. He represented the United States at the 2016 Summer Olympics in Rio de Janeiro alongside Sam Mikulak, John Orozco (who was later substituted with Danell Leyva due to injury), Alex Naddour, and Chris Brooks. Dalton placed second in vault at the 2016 Gymnastics Olympic Test Event.

=== 2017: Retirement ===
On August 9, 2017, news surfaced that Dalton was retiring from competitive gymnastics.

== Personal life ==
In 2013, Dalton signed a multi-year sponsorship agreement with Adidas Gymnastics.

Mesomorphic was a clothing brand founded in 2012 by Jake Dalton and fulfilled by Stars and Stripes Chicago.

== Eponymous skills ==
Dalton has one named element on the parallel bars.

Gymnastics elements named after Jake Dalton
Apparatus	Name	Description	Difficulty (Note: Valid for the 2025–2028 Code of Points)	Added to Code of Points
Parallel bars	Dalton	"Roll bwd. with ½ t. tuck to hang."	E, 0.5	Newsletter 30, 2016. Performed at the 2015 World Challenge Cup in Doha
