= Madison Kocian =

American artistic gymnast (born 1997)

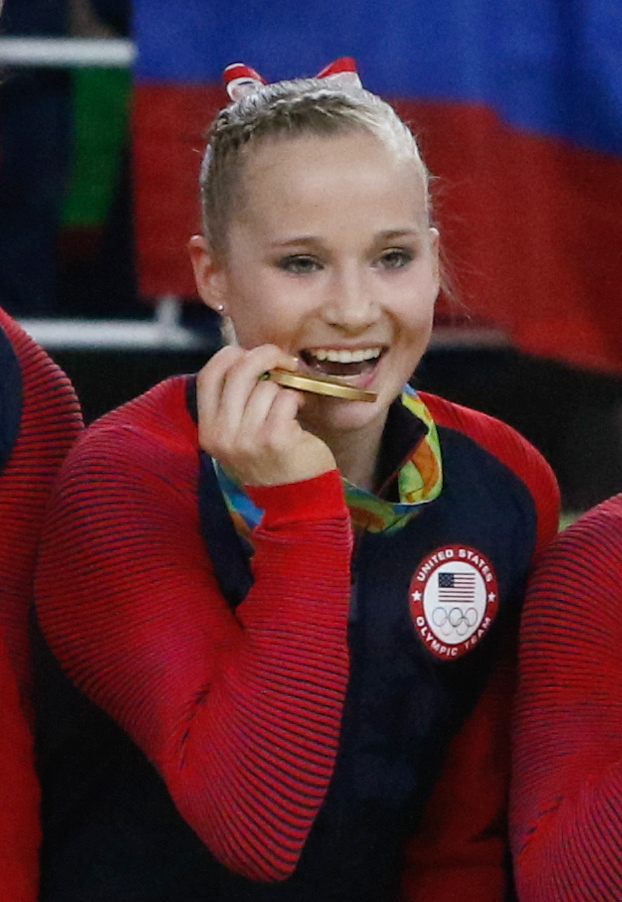
- Kocian at the 2016 Summer Olympics

Personal information
- Full name: Madison Taylor Kocian
- Nickname: Maddie
- Born: June 15, 1997 (age 29) Dallas, Texas, U.S.
- Height: 5 ft 3 in (160 cm)

Gymnastics career
- Discipline: Women's artistic gymnastics
- Country represented: United States; (2009–2011, 2013–2016)
- College team: UCLA Bruins
- Club: WOGA
- Former coaches: Laurent Landi and Cecile Canqueteau-Landi; Valorie Kondos Field; Chris Waller
- Retired: March 12, 2020
Medal record

Representing United States
Olympic Games
Gold medal – first place	2016 Rio de Janeiro	Team
Silver medal – second place	2016 Rio de Janeiro	Uneven bars
World Championships
Gold medal – first place	2014 Nanning	Team
Gold medal – first place	2015 Glasgow	Team
Gold medal – first place	2015 Glasgow	Uneven bars
Pan American Championships
Gold medal – first place	2014 Mississauga	Team
Silver medal – second place	2014 Mississauga	Uneven bars
Representing UCLA Bruins
NCAA Championships
Gold medal – first place	2018 St. Louis	Team
Bronze medal – third place	2019 Fort Worth	Team

Madison Taylor Kocian (born June 15, 1997) is an American retired artistic gymnast. On the uneven bars, she is one of four 2015 World co-champions and the 2016 Olympic silver medalist. She was part of the gold medal-winning team dubbed the "Final Five" at the 2016 Summer Olympics in Rio de Janeiro, and she was a member of the first-place American teams at the 2014 and 2015 World Artistic Gymnastics Championships. She graduated from the University of California, Los Angeles in 2020, where she was a member of its women's gymnastics team. She helped the UCLA Bruins win the 2018 NCAA Championships. She is the second female gymnast to win NCAA, World, and Olympic championship titles, after Kyla Ross.

== Early life ==
Kocian was born and raised in Dallas, Texas. Her parents, Thomas and Cindy Kocian, put her in gymnastics at a young age. At age five, she began training at the World Olympic Gymnastics Academy (WOGA) in Plano, Texas. WOGA was the gym where Olympic all-around champions Carly Patterson and Nastia Liukin trained. Patterson and Liukin served as early inspirations for Kocian, particularly Liukin, who Kocian has likened to an older sister. Kocian has one younger brother. She was raised Catholic. She attended Spring Creek Academy in Plano, Texas, and graduated in 2015.

== Junior elite career ==
=== 2009–2010 ===
Kocian made her elite gymnastics debut at the 2009 U.S. Classic, finishing 18th in the all-around. At the 2009 U.S. Championships, she placed sixth in the all-around competition and was added to the U.S. Junior National Team. Later that year, Kocian was selected to make her international debut at the Top Gym Invitational in Charleroi, Belgium. She won a bronze medal in the all-around behind Larisa Iordache and Julie Croket. In the event finals, she won a gold medal on the vault, and a silver medal on the balance beam behind Iordache.

Kocian began the 2010 season at the WOGA Classic where she finished second in the all-around to her club teammate Grace McLaughlin. She then placed fifth in the all-around at the U.S. Classic in Chicago. At the U.S. Championships, she won a bronze medal on the uneven bars and once again finished fifth in the all-around.

=== 2011–2012 ===
Kocian began the 2011 season by winning a silver medal in the all-around at the WOGA Classic. At the City of Jesolo Trophy, she won a gold medal with the American team and finished second in the all-around to Kyla Ross.

Kocian finished second in the all-around at the 2012 WOGA Classic behind club teammate Katelyn Ohashi. She missed the rest of the season due to a broken growth plate in the radius of her wrist.

== Senior elite career ==
=== 2013 ===
Kocian became age-eligible for senior competitions in 2013. She returned to competition at the WOGA Classic competing on the vault and the uneven bars, where she finished third and second, respectively. She then won the all-around title at the American Classic. At the U.S. Classic, held in Hoffman Estates, Illinois, she placed seventh all-around and earned a silver medal on the uneven bars behind Kyla Ross. On the first day of the U.S. Championships, she led the all-around competition after two rotations. However, on the floor exercise, she rolled her ankle on a triple twist and suffered a third-degree sprain. She withdrew from the competition and did not compete for the rest of the year.

=== 2014 ===
Kocian returned to competition at the WOGA Classic. She only competed on the uneven bars and the balance beam, winning gold and silver on the events, respectively. At the City of Jesolo Trophy, she stuck her full-twisting double back dismount to win the uneven bars gold medal. She once again only competed on uneven bars and balance beam at the U.S. Classic. She won the silver medal on the uneven bars behind Ashton Locklear, and she placed eighth on the balance beam. At the U.S. Championships, she again finished second to Locklear on the uneven bars and also placed fifth on the balance beam.

Kocian competed at the Pan American Championships in Mississauga, Canada. She helped the American team place first in the team competition. In the event finals, she placed second on the uneven bars behind teammate Ashton Locklear. She also qualified for the balance beam event final and finished fourth. On September 17, Kocian was selected to compete at the 2014 World Championships in Nanning, China, alongside Locklear, Alyssa Baumann, Simone Biles, Kyla Ross, and Mykayla Skinner. In qualifications, she competed in the all-around and finished in 14th place with a score of 55.966, but she did not make it into the all-around final due to the two-per-country rule, with Biles, Ross, and Skinner all outscoring her. She competed in the team final on the uneven bars and contributed a score of 14.900 to the U.S. team's gold medal finish.

After the World Championships, Kocian chose to have wrist surgery. After breaking a growth plate in 2012, her ulna bone grew to be 6 millimeters longer than her radius. She had a plate and seven screws put in, and she missed five months of training.

=== 2015 ===
Kocian returned to competition at the U.S. Classic, competing only on the uneven bars and balance beam. She finished first on the uneven bars and ninth on the balance beam. At the U.S. Championships, she placed sixth in the all-around and won her first national title on the uneven bars. She was once again named to the senior U.S. national team. She was invited to the World Championships selection camp held on October 6.

Kocian was selected to compete at the World Championships in Glasgow, alongside Simone Biles, Gabby Douglas, Brenna Dowell, Maggie Nichols, and Aly Raisman. During the qualification round, Kocian competed on the balance beam and on the uneven bars, where she qualified for the event final in third place. Her scores helped the American team qualify for the team final in first place and secured a team berth for the 2016 Olympic Games. She then helped the U.S. team win the gold medal in the team final. In the uneven bars final, she scored a 15.366, placing her in an unprecedented four-way tie for the gold medal with Russians Viktoria Komova, Daria Spiridonova, and China's Fan Yilin.

=== 2016 ===
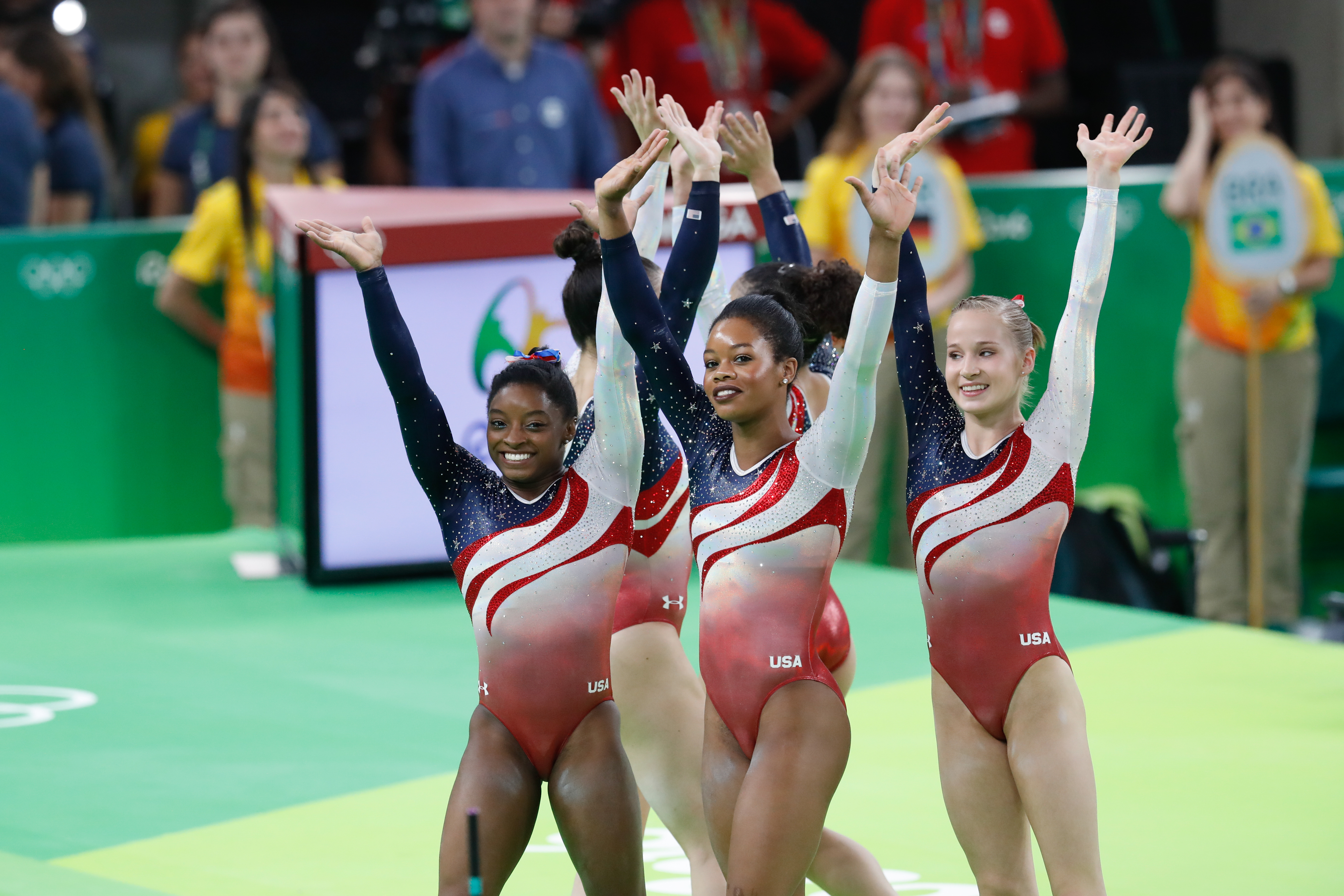
Kocian (right) at the 2016 Summer Olympics

Kocian began the Olympic season at the WOGA Classic and competed on the uneven bars and balance beam, winning the gold medals in both events. In March, Kocian, along with fellow National Team members, attended the Team USA Media Summit in Los Angeles, an event for the media to interview and interact with Olympic hopefuls. Kocian attended the event on crutches and wearing a cast, and confirmed to reporters that she had a fractured tibia. She missed six weeks of training.

Kocian returned to competition at the U.S. Classic and competed on the uneven bars and balance beam. She finished second on the uneven bars behind Ashton Locklear and placed 15th on the balance beam. She returned to competing on all four events at the U.S. Championships and placed fifth in the all-around. She once again finished second to Locklear on the uneven bars. At the U.S. Olympic Trials, she placed eighth in the all-around and won the uneven bars gold medal.

On July 10, 2016, Kocian was named to the U.S. team for the 2016 Olympic Games alongside Simone Biles, Gabby Douglas, Aly Raisman, and Laurie Hernandez.

==== Rio de Janeiro Olympics ====
On August 7, Kocian competed in the qualification round at the 2016 Summer Olympics. Despite showing all four events in podium training, she competed only on the uneven bars, scoring a 15.833. Her score was the highest on that event, and she qualified in first place for the uneven bars event final. The American team also qualified for the team final in first place by nearly ten points ahead of second-place China. In the team final on August 9, Kocian again competed on the uneven bars, anchoring the American team on the event. She contributed a score of 15.933 to help the team to its second consecutive team gold at the Olympic Games, more than eight points ahead of the silver medalists. Kocian's uneven bars score tied with Russia's Aliya Mustafina the highest of the team final. On August 14, Kocian won a silver medal in the uneven bars event final, scoring 15.833 and finishing behind Mustafina by only 0.067.

== College career ==
=== 2017 ===
Kocian began attending the University of California, Los Angeles in the fall of 2016 and joined the UCLA Bruins gymnastics program. Her collegiate debut came on January 7, 2017, in a home dual meet against the University of Arkansas where she won three individual event titles and tallied an all-around score of 39.425 to win the all-around title. Kocian and 2012 Olympic gold medalist Kyla Ross became the first Olympic gold medalists to compete in NCAA gymnastics. In February 2017, she scored a perfect 10.0 on the uneven bars in a dual meet against Stanford. On March 27, 2017, Kocian received first-team regular season All-American honors in the all-around and second-team honors on floor exercise. She helped UCLA place fourth in the Super Six at the NCAA Championships.

=== 2018 ===
On August 21, 2017, Kocian underwent surgery to repair her torn labrum, an injury she had dealt with since the 2016 Olympic Trials. She returned to NCAA competition on January 20, 2018, in a dual meet against Arizona, competing only on the balance beam. She added floor exercise to her repertoire on February 25 in a dual meet against Oregon State, and she returned to competing on uneven bars at the NCAA Regional Championship on April 7. She helped UCLA win the Pac-12 Championships. During the Super Six finals, she fell on the balance beam but contributed great performances on uneven bars and floor exercise to help UCLA win their first NCAA Gymnastics title since 2010.

=== 2019 ===
On January 21, Kocian earned her second career perfect 10 on uneven bars in a meet against Arizona State. She helped UCLA repeat at the Pac-12 Championships, and UCLA finish third at the NCAA Championships. Kocian earned several post-season accolades, including Pac-12 First Team honors on uneven bars and was named to the Pac-12 All-Academic team with a 3.81 GPA.

=== 2020 ===
Kocian was sidelined for the first few weeks of the 2020 season with shoulder soreness. She delayed surgery for another torn labrum to compete in her senior season. She returned to competition at a tri-meet with BYU and Utah State, where she competed on both uneven bars and floor exercise. On March 12, all remaining competitions for the season were canceled due to the COVID-19 pandemic in the United States, including UCLA's senior night and the entire post-season. This effectively ended Kocian's gymnastics career. She confirmed in April she would not return to elite gymnastics due to her injury history.

Kocian was named the Pac-12 Conference scholar-athlete of the year for the sport of gymnastics. At the conclusion of the school year, Kocian was named UCLA scholar-athlete of the year alongside cross country athlete Millen Trujillo. She was also named as the Bruins' Tom Hansen Medal recipient alongside football player Darnay Holmes. She was nominated by UCLA for the NCAA Woman of the Year Award, but was not selected by the Pac-12 Conference to be its conference-level nominee.

=== Career perfect 10.0 ===
Kocian received a perfect 10 twice in her NCAA career, both on the uneven bars.

Season	Date	Event	Meet
2017	Feb 11, 2017	Uneven bars	UCLA vs Stanford
2019	Jan 21, 2019	Uneven bars	UCLA vs Arizona State

== Personal life ==
On August 16, 2018, Kocian came forward as a survivor of Larry Nassar's sexual abuse alongside UCLA teammate Kyla Ross. Kocian also shared that she did not feel supported by USA Gymnastics and described a toxic culture that led to her being afraid to speak out about the abuse. Kocian and Ross both filed civil lawsuits against USA Gymnastics, Michigan State University, and the United States Olympic & Paralympic Committee. All three entities settled their lawsuits related to Nassar's abuse and paid his victims.

In July 2022, Kocian began studying at the Baylor College of Medicine in its physician assistant program. She graduated from the program in December 2024.

In February 2025, Kocian announced her engagement to Jack Hughes. The pair were married on May 24, 2026.

Kocian is a lifelong diehard Texas Rangers baseball fan.

== Competitive history ==
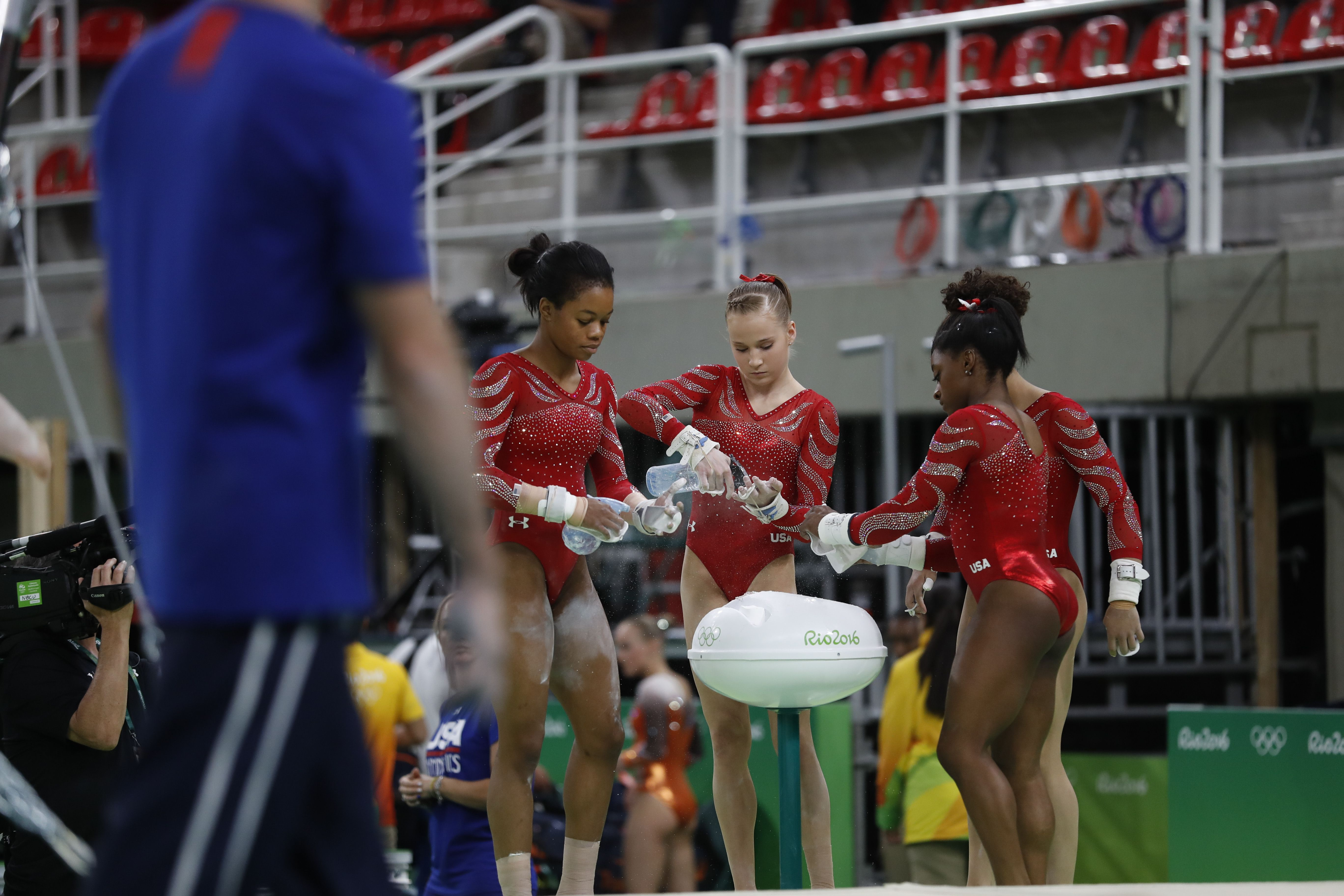
Kocian (center) at the 2016 Summer Olympics

Competitive history of Madison Kocian at the junior elite level
Year	Event	Team	AA	VT	UB	BB	FX
2009	U.S. Classic		18	20	11	13	42
2009	U.S. Championships		6	15	8	10	11
2009	Top Gym Invitational		3rd place, bronze medalist(s)	1st place, gold medalist(s)		2nd place, silver medalist(s)	
2010	WOGA Classic	1st place, gold medalist(s)	2nd place, silver medalist(s)	1st place, gold medalist(s)	2nd place, silver medalist(s)	8	2nd place, silver medalist(s)
2010	U.S. Classic		5	5	3rd place, bronze medalist(s)	13	18
2010	U.S. Championships		5	6	3rd place, bronze medalist(s)	14	6
2011	WOGA Classic	1st place, gold medalist(s)	2nd place, silver medalist(s)	1st place, gold medalist(s)	7	2nd place, silver medalist(s)	1st place, gold medalist(s)
2011	City of Jesolo Trophy	1st place, gold medalist(s)	2nd place, silver medalist(s)	4	4	3rd place, bronze medalist(s)	5
2012	WOGA Classic	1st place, gold medalist(s)	2nd place, silver medalist(s)	4	1st place, gold medalist(s)	3rd place, bronze medalist(s)	3rd place, bronze medalist(s)

Competitive history of Madison Kocian at the senior elite level
Year	Event	Team	AA	VT	UB	BB	FX
2013	WOGA Classic	1st place, gold medalist(s)		3rd place, bronze medalist(s)	2nd place, silver medalist(s)		
2013	American Classic		1st place, gold medalist(s)	1st place, gold medalist(s)	1st place, gold medalist(s)	2nd place, silver medalist(s)	2nd place, silver medalist(s)
2013	U.S. Classic		7		2nd place, silver medalist(s)	13	10
2013	U.S. Championships		WD				
2014	WOGA Classic	1st place, gold medalist(s)			1st place, gold medalist(s)	2nd place, silver medalist(s)	
2014	City of Jesolo Trophy				1st place, gold medalist(s)		
2014	U.S. Classic				2nd place, silver medalist(s)	8	
2014	U.S. Championships				2nd place, silver medalist(s)	5	
2014	Pan American Championships	1st place, gold medalist(s)			2nd place, silver medalist(s)	4	
2014	World Championships	1st place, gold medalist(s)					
2015	U.S. Classic				1st place, gold medalist(s)	9	
2015	U.S. Championships		6		1st place, gold medalist(s)	12	8
2015	World Championships	1st place, gold medalist(s)			1st place, gold medalist(s)		
2016	WOGA Classic	1st place, gold medalist(s)			1st place, gold medalist(s)	1st place, gold medalist(s)	
2016	U.S. Classic				2nd place, silver medalist(s)	15	
2016	U.S. Championships		5		2nd place, silver medalist(s)	7	6
2016	U.S. Olympic Trials		8	12	1st place, gold medalist(s)	9	9
2016	Olympic Games	1st place, gold medalist(s)			2nd place, silver medalist(s)		

Competitive history of Madison Kocian at the NCAA level
Year	Event	Team	AA	VT	UB	BB	FX
2017	Pac-12 Championships	3rd place, bronze medalist(s)	6			7	5
2017	NCAA Championships	4	7				7
2018	Pac-12 Championships	1st place, gold medalist(s)					
2018	NCAA Championships	1st place, gold medalist(s)					
2019	Pac-12 Championships	1st place, gold medalist(s)			5	9	
2019	NCAA Championships	3rd place, bronze medalist(s)			9	11	
2020	Pac-12 Championships	Canceled due to the COVID-19 pandemic in the USA.					
2020	NCAA Championships	Canceled due to the COVID-19 pandemic in the USA.					
