= Brandon Wynn =

American artistic gymnast

- Full name: Brandon Ross Wynn
- Nickname: Lord of the Rings
- Born: November 4, 1988 (age 37)
- Height: 5 ft 6 in (168 cm)

Gymnastics career
- Discipline: Men's artistic gymnastics
- Country represented: United States (2009–2017)
- College team: Ohio State Buckeyes
- Gym: USOTC; Team Hilton HHonors; Will-Moor Gymnastics
- Head coach: Andriy Stepanchenko
- Former coaches: Rustam Sharipov, Casimiro Suárez
- Eponymous skills: Wynn (rings)
Medal record
Men's artistic gymnastics
Representing United States
Event	1st	2nd	3rd
World Championships	0	0	1
Pan American Games	1	0	1
Pan American Championships	1	1	0
Total	2	1	2
World Championships
Bronze medal – third place	2013 Antwerp	Rings
Pan American Games
Gold medal – first place	2011 Guadalajara	Rings
Bronze medal – third place	2011 Guadalajara	Team
Pan American Championships
Gold medal – first place	2014 Mississauga	Team
Silver medal – second place	2014 Mississauga	Rings

Brandon Ross Wynn (born November 4, 1988) is a retired American artistic gymnast. He was a member of the United States men's national artistic gymnastics team. Nicknamed "Lord of the Rings", he won the bronze medal at the 2013 World Artistic Gymnastics Championships, a gold medal at the 2011 Pan American Games, and a silver medal at the 2014 Pan American Gymnastics Championships in addition to his 4 titles at the USA Gymnastics National Championships on the apparatus.

== Early life and education ==
Wynn was born on November 4, 1988, to Lorraine Daversa and Bill Wynn. He grew up in Voorhees Township, New Jersey, and started gymnastics at 7 years old. He trained at Will-Moor Gymnastics and attended Eastern Regional High School before enrolling at Ohio State University to pursue gymnastics.

== Gymnastics career ==
Wynn was a member of the U.S. National Team for 8 consecutive years and was inducted into the Ohio State University Hall Of Fame in 2018.

Wynn competed at the 2013 World Artistic Gymnastics Championships and attained a Bronze Medal on Still Rings. Wynn is one of two men in US history to grab an individual medal in Still Rings. Wynn competed at the 2014 Winter Cup, where he won gold on rings.

== Eponymous skills ==
Wynn has one named element on the rings.

Gymnastics elements named after Brandon Wynn
Apparatus	Name	Description	Difficulty (Note: Valid for the 2025–2028 Code of Points)	Added to Code of Points
Rings	Wynn	"Slow roll fwd. with straight body through cross to inverted cross (2 s.)."	E, 0.5	Newsletter 28, 2015. Performed at the 2014 Pan American Gymnastics Championships
