= Danell Leyva =

Cuban-American gymnast (born 1991)

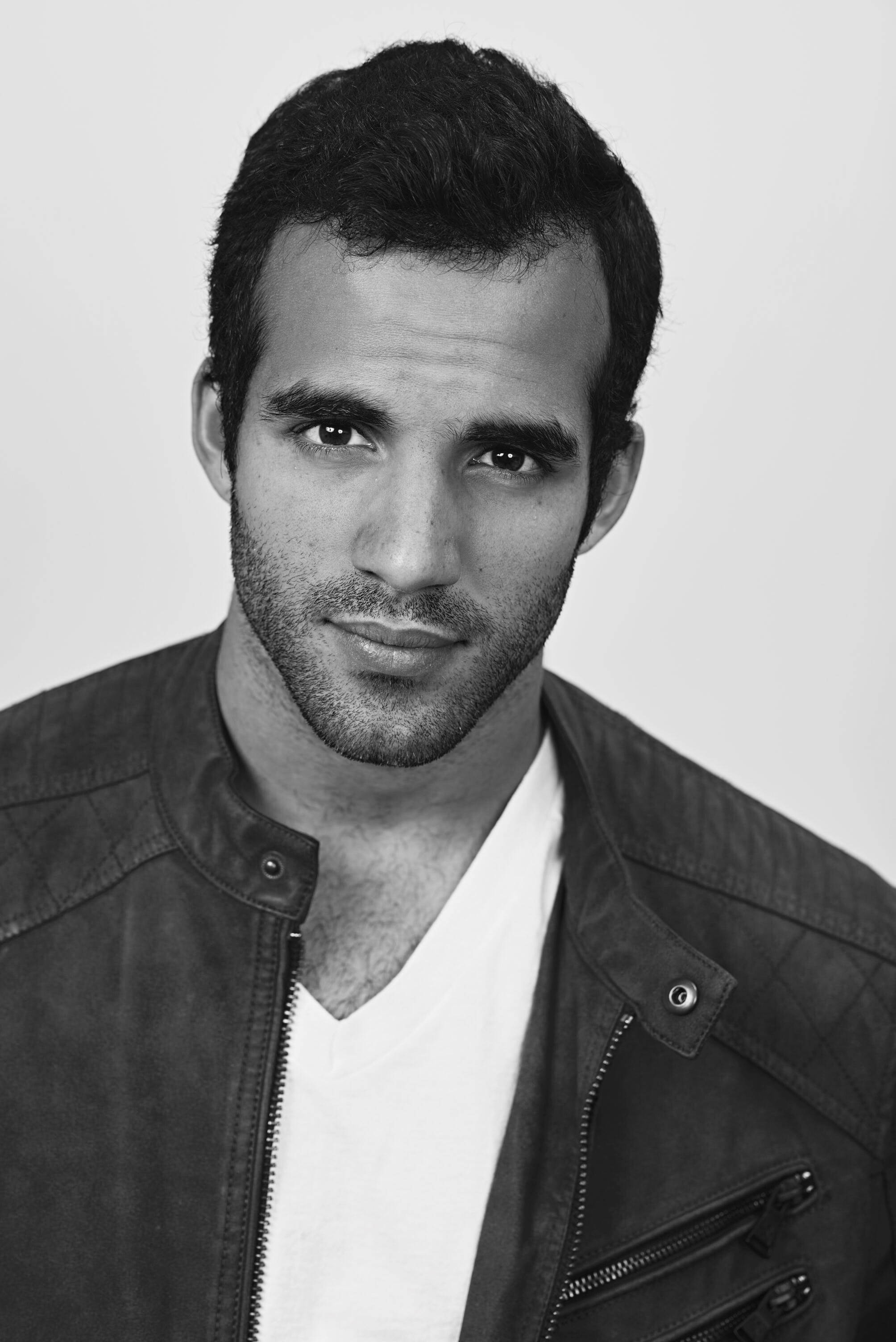
- Leyva in 2017

Personal information
- Full name: Danell Johan Leyva Gonzalez
- Born: October 30, 1991 (age 35) Cárdenas, Cuba
- Height: 170 cm (5 ft 7 in)

Gymnastics career
- Discipline: Men's artistic gymnastics
- Country represented: United States; (2009–2016)
- Gym: Team Hilton HHonors; Universal Gymnastics
- Head coach: Yin Alvarez
- Retired: 2016
Medal record
Men's artistic gymnastics
Representing United States
Event	1st	2nd	3rd
Olympic Games	0	2	1
World Championships	1	2	2
Pacific Rim Championships	3	0	1
Pan American Championships	1	2	0
Total	5	6	4
Olympic Games
Silver medal – second place	2016 Rio de Janeiro	Parallel bars
Silver medal – second place	2016 Rio de Janeiro	Horizontal bar
Bronze medal – third place	2012 London	All-around
World Championships
Gold medal – first place	2011 Tokyo	Parallel bars
Silver medal – second place	2014 Nanning	Parallel bars
Silver medal – second place	2015 Glasgow	Horizontal bar
Bronze medal – third place	2011 Tokyo	Team
Bronze medal – third place	2014 Nanning	Team
Pacific Rim Championships
Gold medal – first place	2010 Melbourne	Team
Gold medal – first place	2010 Melbourne	Parallel bars
Gold medal – first place	2010 Melbourne	Horizontal bar
Bronze medal – third place	2010 Melbourne	Rings
Pan American Championships
Gold medal – first place	2008 Rosario	Horizontal bar
Silver medal – second place	2008 Rosario	Pommel horse
Silver medal – second place	2008 Rosario	Parallel bars

Danell Johan Leyva Gonzalez (born October 30, 1991) is a Cuban-American former gymnast who competed for the United States. He was a member of the United States men's national artistic gymnastics team and is the 2012 Olympic individual all-around bronze medalist and 2016 Olympic parallel bars and horizontal bar silver medalist. He is also the 2011 US national all-around gold medalist and the 2011 world champion on the parallel bars. With a combined total of 8 Olympic and World Championships medals, Leyva is the second most decorated American male gymnast after Paul Hamm.

In gymnastics, Leyva was a specialist on parallel bars and horizontal bar, having his own signature move (jam-dislocate-hop to undergrips) on the latter.

== Early life and education ==
Leyva was born on October 30, 1991, in Cárdenas, Cuba. His stepfather and coach, Yin Alvarez (famous for his impassioned sideline accompaniment of every element of Danell's routines) and mother, Maria Gonzalez, were both members of Cuba's national gymnastics team. Leyva's biological father, Johan Leyva, lives in Spain.

Gonzalez and Leyva defected to Miami when Leyva was two years old. Alvarez defected by swimming across the Rio Grande to the United States while his team was competing in Mexico. Together, Alvarez and Gonzalez opened a gym in Miami several years later, and they married in 2001. They settled in Miami.

== Gymnastics career ==
=== Junior ===
Leyva competed at his first Winter Cup in 2006. He went on to compete in the junior division of the US National Championships, where he came 1st all-around, won gold on floor exercise and horizontal bar, and tied for silver on parallel bars.

In 2008, at the Junior National Championships, Leyva won the all-around, horizontal bar, parallel bars, and pommel horse titles. He was also the horizontal bar champion at the 2008 Pan American Gymnastics Championships in Argentina. He went on to be chosen as part of the 2008 Pacific Rim Championships team and competed in San Jose, California. The US team won gold, and Leyva won gold in the all-around and bronze on parallel bars in the junior division finals.

=== Senior career ===
==== 2009 ====
In 2009, he became the youngest member of the US senior national team at age 17, and at the National Championships won the gold medal on the horizontal bar and the silver medal on the parallel bars. He was chosen as one of four US male gymnasts to compete at the 2009 World Artistic Gymnastics Championships in London. He qualified for the horizontal bar final, where he placed 4th.

==== 2010 ====
After winning medals in his two best events (horizontal bar and parallel bars) at the Winter Cup, he was selected for the men's team to compete at the Pacific Rim Championships in Melbourne. He won individual titles on the horizontal bar and parallel bars, as well as a bronze medal on still rings. He also qualified for the all-around and pommel horse finals, where he placed 7th in both events. In the summer, he once again competed at the 2010 US National Championships, where he became the US gold medalist on the parallel bars and the all-around silver medalist. He was chosen for the team to compete at the 2010 World Artistic Gymnastics Championships. In Rotterdam, he contributed to the team's 4th-place finish and also qualified for the horizontal bar final, where he placed 5th.

==== 2011 ====
At the 2011 US National Championships, Leyva beat reigning national champion and world bronze medalist Jonathan Horton in the all-around, winning his first all-around US National Championship at the senior level. He also won the parallel bars and horizontal bar titles. He was subsequently chosen to be one of the anchors for the US team at the 2011 World Artistic Gymnastics Championships in Tokyo, which won the bronze medal. This was the first time the US men's team had won medals at the World Championships since 2003. Leyva qualified for the all-around final, but his chin crashed into the horizontal bar in his last rotation, and he was unable to complete his routine, resulting in a 24th-place finish. He rallied for event finals, winning gold on parallel bars.

==== 2012 ====
Leyva won medals in several events at the Winter Cup, then won the American Cup in New York City. He placed 2nd in the all-around at the National Championships in Saint Louis, behind John Orozco. He defended his national titles on parallel bars and horizontal bar. He went on to compete in the Olympic Trials in San Jose, where he came first with his combined scores from the Visa Championships and the two days of Trials. This secured him an automatic berth on the US Olympic Team, alongside Orozco, who finished in second place overall. The next day, it was announced that Leyva and Orozco would be joined in London by Jonathan Horton, Sam Mikulak and Jake Dalton, with their 2011 Worlds teammates Alex Naddour, Steven Legendre and Chris Brooks as alternates. Leyva earned the bronze medal in the individual all-around at the Olympics.

==== 2016 ====
Leyva, originally an alternate, was added to the 2016 US Olympic Team in July 2016, following the withdrawal of Orozco due to an ACL injury. On August 6, 2016, the men's team qualified for the team final in second place. Leyva qualified individually for individual event finals in both parallel bars and horizontal bar. In the final, Leyva contributed scores on pommel horse, parallel bars, and horizontal bar. He fell on the horizontal bar, and the team finished 5th once again. On August 16, Danell won silver in the Olympic men's parallel bar final with a score of 15.900. About an hour and a half later, he won another silver in the horizontal bar final, scoring 15.500. Despite being originally named as an alternate to the team, Leyva is the only member to walk away with two medals, contributing to the US men's gymnastics team's total of three medals, along with Naddour's bronze on the pommel horse.

== Personal life ==
In 2013, Leyva signed a multi-year sponsorship agreement with Adidas Gymnastics. Fellow US Olympic Team members Jake Dalton, McKayla Maroney and Jordyn Wieber were also sponsored by Adidas.

Leyva has a sister, Dayanis Mesa, who is a television host. After ending his career in gymnastics, Leyva began to pursue an acting and media career. Soon after the 2016 Olympics, he moved from Miami to Los Angeles to pursue this career and enrolled in acting classes. By mid-2017, Leyva had already filmed two television advertisements, appeared on a Nickelodeon show, and worked as a choreography consultant on Brooklyn Nine-Nine. He also purchased a production company, which he named Parallel Entertainment.

Leyva competed on American Ninja Warrior in 2019.

On October 11, 2020, for National Coming Out Day, Leyva revealed via Twitter that he is bisexual and pansexual.
