= John Orozco =

American artistic gymnast

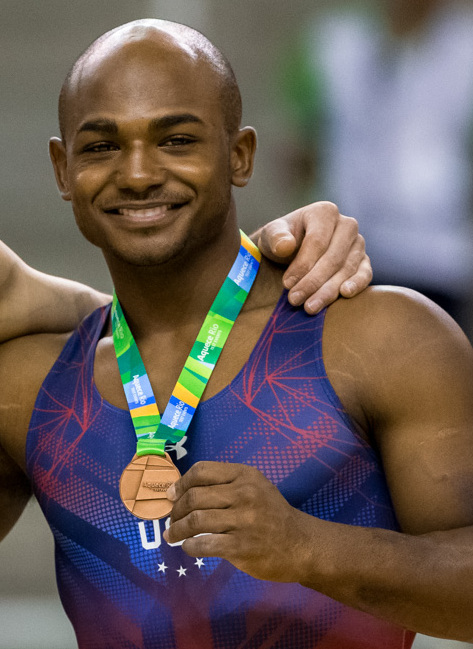
- Orozco at the 2016 Gymnastics Olympic Test Event

Personal information
- Full name: John Orozco
- Nickname: Silent Ninja
- Born: December 30, 1992 (age 33) The Bronx, New York, U.S.
- Height: 165 cm (5 ft 5 in)

Gymnastics career
- Discipline: Men's artistic gymnastics
- Country represented: Puerto Rico; (2011–2017 (United States))
- Former countries represented: United States
- Gym: USOTC; Team Hilton HHonors; World Cup Gymnastics
- Head coach: Vitaly Marinich
- Former coach: Jason Hebert
Medal record
Men's artistic gymnastics
Representing United States
Event	1st	2nd	3rd
World Championships	0	0	3
Pacific Rim Championships	6	3	0
Total	6	3	3
World Championships
Bronze medal – third place	2011 Tokyo	Team
Bronze medal – third place	2013 Antwerp	Parallel bars
Bronze medal – third place	2014 Nanning	Team
Pacific Rim Championships
Gold medal – first place	2014 Richmond	Team
Gold medal – first place	2014 Richmond	All-around
Gold medal – first place	2014 Richmond	Parallel bars
Gold medal – first place	2014 Richmond	Horizontal bar
Gold medal – first place	2016 Everett	Team
Gold medal – first place	2016 Everett	Horizontal bar
Silver medal – second place	2014 Richmond	Floor
Silver medal – second place	2014 Richmond	Rings
Silver medal – second place	2016 Everett	Rings

John Orozco (born December 30, 1992) is an artistic gymnast who competed in the 2012 Olympics and is the 2012 U.S national champion. He was a member of the United States men's national artistic gymnastics team selected for the U.S. Olympic gymnastics team for the 2016 Olympic Games but withdrew on July 15, 2016, due to an ACL injury. After graduating High School at 17, John trained for 7 years at the United States Olympic Training Center in Colorado Springs, Colorado.

In 2020, he switched his affiliation to Puerto Rico for international competitions.

== Early life and education ==
Orozco was born in The Bronx, New York, and is the son of Puerto Rican parents. While growing up, his mother drove him 30 miles from his home in the Bronx to his gym, World Cup Gymnastics, in Chappaqua, New York for practice. At the age of 8 years old John was enrolled into free gymnastics lessons at a gym in Manhattan called Sutton Gymnastics. The gym allowed him to be part of a program for socioeconomically disadvantaged children. He trained at World Cup Gymnastics in Chappaqua while finishing his high school education at Felisa Rincon de Gautier Institute in Soundview.

== Gymnastics career ==
=== Junior ===
In 2007, he won the Junior Visa U.S. National Championships and became the youngest male gymnast to qualify for the finals. He then became an alternate on the Junior National Team and represented the USA in the Pan-American Games. He won three consecutive Junior Visa U.S. National Championships in a row (2007, 2008, and 2009).

He then competed at the Pacific Rim Championships in 2008 and 2010, helping the team to gold medals. At the 2010 Pacific Rim Championships in Melbourne, he also won gold medals in the All-Around and Horizontal Bar and silver medals in Pommel Horse, Still Rings, and Parallel Bars.

=== Senior ===
In 2010, John Orozco competed in the US National Visa Championships as a Senior for the first time at 17 years old. Unfortunately, he couldn't finish the competition due to an Achilles tendon rupture in his right leg while competing on Vault during preliminaries. After surgery and rehab, he was able to return to training.

==== 2011 ====
After graduating from high school, John decided to defer any college plans to concentrate on training for the 2012 Summer Olympics, leaving New York to train at the United States Olympic Training Center (U.S.O.T.C.) in Colorado Springs.

John made the Senior National team in 2011 where he performed well at the U.S. National Visa Championships in St Paul, Minnesota. He ranked 2nd on Parallel Bars, 3rd in All-Around, Pommel Horse and Horizontal Bar, and 4th on Still Rings.

He was chosen to be part of the U.S.A. team traveling to the 2011 World Artistic Gymnastics Championships in Tokyo, Japan, where his consistent performances helped the team to a Bronze medal. He competed in the All-Around final where he finished 5th, and the Horizontal Bar final where he made a costly error, finishing in 8th place.

After the world championships, it was announced that John Orozco had decided to turn 'pro', forfeiting future NCAA eligibility.

==== 2012 ====
In the first big meet of American men's gymnastics, Orozco took part in the Winter Cup in Las Vegas. In previous years, he had been unable to perform to the best of his ability due to illness or injury at this competition. He ended up finishing the competition in first place, more than 5 full points ahead of 2nd-place finisher Steven Legendre.

He performed in the All-Around at the AT&T American Cup competition at Madison Square Garden, New York City, in March 2012.

At the Visa Championships in St. Louis, Missouri in June 2012, Orozco edged out 2011 All Around Champion Danell Leyva by a slight margin to win the All-Around Gold medal and clinch the national championship.

In July 2012, John Orozco competed in the 2012 London Summer Olympics for the United States. He competed in the Men's artistic team all-around and the Men's artistic individual all-around, placing fifth and eighth respectively. In both events he erred on the pommel horse, even though going into the Olympics it was his strongest event. In conjunction with his participation in the 2012 Summer Olympics, Orozco appeared in First: The Official Film of the London 2012 Olympic Games, appearing as the first athlete profiled, giving his backstory and reviewing his actions in competition. In October, Orozco suffered tears to both the anterior cruciate ligament and meniscus in his left knee while performing on the Kellogg's Tour of Gymnastics Champions. He underwent surgery to repair the ligaments, went through rehabilitation, and returned to competition.

==== 2013 ====
After sustaining an injury to his left knee during the Kellogg's Tour of Gymnastics Superstars in late 2012, Orozco was out of competition for much of 2013. His first competition since the Olympics was the 2013 US Nationals, where he competed in a leg brace and finished in fourth place; he was named as an alternate to the World Championships team but was added to the team officially after Danell Leyva withdrew due to injury.

At the World Championships in Antwerp, Belgium, Orozco performed on the pommel horse, parallel bars, and horizontal bar in the qualification rounds. He qualified in 7th place on the parallel bars and earned a bronze medal in the event final.

In December, Orozco competed at the FIG World Cup event in Glasgow, Scotland. He placed 4th after a fall on the horizontal bar.

==== 2014 ====
In February, Orozco competed at the 2014 Winter Cup and won gold on the horizontal bar. In August, he competed at the 2014 P&G U.S. Championships in Pittsburgh. He placed first in the horizontal bar competition and second in all-around. In October, he was scheduled to participate in the World Artistic Gymnastics Championships in Nanjing, China, as a member of the U.S. national team. Orozco re-tore an Achilles tendon in June 2015 and expected to be recovering until 2016. He was selected for the U.S. Olympic gymnastics team for the 2016 Olympic Games but withdrew on July 15, 2016, due to an ACL injury.

==== Switch to Puerto Rican team ====
In 2020, he changed his affiliation for international competitions from the United States to Puerto Rico, where his parents had lived before moving to the Bronx.

== Personal life ==
He was featured in the Gym Class Heroes music video for "The Fighter" that featured the vocals of Ryan Tedder. The music video opens with Orozco saying: "I'm John Orozco, I'm an Olympic gymnast, I'm from Bronx, NY... and I'm a fighter". The video shows him competing, suffering an ankle injury and training to get back in shape for a comeback. It also uses footage of Orozco's childhood training and of his parents and trainers encouraging him throughout the way.

Orozco also appeared in three episodes of the TV show Law & Order as a background actor.

== See also ==
- Nationality changes in gymnastics
