= Alex Naddour =

American artistic gymnast

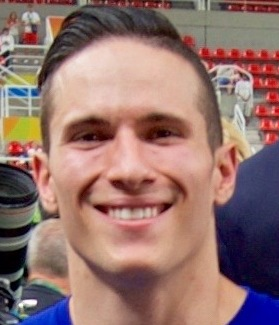
- Naddour at the 2016 Summer Olympics

Personal information
- Full name: Alexander Michael Naddour
- Born: March 4, 1991 (age 35) Gilbert, Arizona, U.S.
- Height: 170 cm (5 ft 7 in)
- Spouse: Hollie Vise (m. 2015)

Gymnastics career
- Discipline: Men's artistic gymnastics
- Country represented: United States (2010–2018)
- College team: Oklahoma Sooners
- Gym: USA Youth Fitness Center; Team Hilton HHonors
- Retired: March 26, 2021
Medal record
Men's artistic gymnastics
Representing United States
Event	1st	2nd	3rd
Olympic Games	0	0	1
World Championships	0	0	2
Pacific Rim Championships	3	0	0
Total	3	0	3
Olympic Games
Bronze medal – third place	2016 Rio de Janeiro	Pommel horse
World Championships
Bronze medal – third place	2011 Tokyo	Team
Bronze medal – third place	2014 Nanning	Team
Pacific Rim Championships
Gold medal – first place	2014 Richmond	Team
Gold medal – first place	2016 Everett	Team
Gold medal – first place	2016 Everett	Pommel horse

Alexander Michael Naddour (born March 4, 1991) is a former American artistic gymnast. He was a member of the United States men's national artistic gymnastics team and part of the bronze medal team at the 2011 World Artistic Gymnastics Championships. Naddour was an alternate for Team USA at the 2012 Summer Olympics in London. He also won a bronze medal in the pommel horse individual event competition at the 2016 Summer Olympics in Rio de Janeiro. He announced his retirement from gymnastics on March 26, 2021, via Instagram.

== Early life and education ==
Naddour was born on March 4, 1991, to Mike and Sandy Naddour in Gilbert, Arizona. He attended Highland High School before enrolling at the University of Oklahoma to pursue gymnastics.

== Gymnastics career ==
Naddour was a member of the U.S. men's national team for the 2011, 2013, 2014, 2015, and 2017 World Championships. Pommel horse is considered his strongest event. He is a five-time national champion, three-time World finalist and Olympic bronze medalist in the pommel horse.

On June 20, 2018, Alex Naddour was suspended by USA Gymnastics following allegations of sexual misconduct. The USA Gymnastics officials were presented with the first allegations in 2012. Additional allegations were made against Naddour around 2016. Naddour tweeted in response: "I have no idea what is happening or why, we are trying to contact safe sport for any information." Naddour was cleared of a sexual misconduct allegation by the United States Center for SafeSport and removed from the USA Gymnastics suspended list in November 2018.

=== Olympics ===
On June 25, 2016, Naddour was named to the 2016 U.S. men's gymnastics team for the 2016 Summer Olympics in Rio. Naddour had been named as an alternate for the U.S. in 2012. On August 14, 2016, Naddour won a bronze medal in the pommel horse at the Rio Olympics, the first medal of that Olympiad for the U.S. male gymnasts and the first pommel horse medal for Team USA since Peter Vidmar and Tim Daggett in 1984.

== Personal life ==
In 2015, Naddour married fellow gymnast Hollie Vise. The couple have a daughter, Lilah, born in February 2016, and a son, Crew, born in June 2018.
