= 2010 U.S. National Gymnastics Championships =

2010 Visa U.S. National Gymnastics Championships
- Venue: XL Center
- Location: Hartford, Connecticut U.S.
- Date: August 11, 2010—August 14, 2010

The 2010 Visa U.S. National Gymnastics Championships was the 47th edition of the U.S. National Gymnastics Championships. The competition was held from August 11–14, 2010 at the XL Center in Hartford, Connecticut.

== Event information ==
The forty-seventh edition of the Championships, the competition was held at the XL Center in Hartford, Connecticut, a multi-purpose arena. The competition was televised by NBC Sports Network.

=== Competition schedule ===
The competition featured Senior and Junior competitions for both women's and men's disciplines. The competition was as follows;

Thursday, August 11
1 p.m. - Junior Men Competition - Day 1
6:30 p.m. - Senior Men's Competition - Day 1

Friday, August 12
1 p.m. - Junior Women's Competition - Day 1
6:30 p.m. - Senior Women's Competition - Day 1

Saturday, August 13
11:30 a.m. - Senior Men's Competition - Final Day
6 p.m. - Junior Men's Competition - Final Day

Sunday, August 14
10 a.m. - Junior Women's Competition - Final Day
2:30 p.m. - Senior Women's Competition - Final Day

Note: all times are in Central Time Zone.

=== Sponsorship ===
Visa was the title sponsor of the event as they had been since 2004.

== Medalists ==
Event	Gold	Silver	Bronze
Senior Women
Individual all-around	Rebecca Bross	Mattie Larson	Aly Raisman
Vault	Alicia Sacramone	Vanessa Zamarripa	Brandie Jay
Uneven bars	Rebecca Bross	Cassandra Whitcomb	Mattie Larson
Balance beam	Rebecca Bross	Alicia Sacramone	Aly Raisman
Floor	Mattie Larson	Rebecca Bross	Aly Raisman
Junior Women
Individual all-around	Kyla Ross	Katelyn Ohashi	McKayla Maroney
Vault	McKayla Maroney	Lexie Priessman	Kyla Ross
Uneven bars	Katelyn Ohashi	McKenzie Wofford	Madison Kocian
Balance beam	Kyla Ross	Gabby Douglas	Ericha Fassbender
Floor	Sarah Finnegan	Sabrina Vega	Kyla Ross
Senior Men
Individual all-around	Jonathan Horton	Danell Leyva	Brandon Wynn
Floor	Joshua Dixon	Jacob Dalton	Jonathan Horton
Pommel horse	Daniel Ribiero	Chris Cameron	Glen Ishino
Rings	Brandon Wynn	Jonathan Horton	Kevin Tan
Vault	Steven Legendre	Alex Buscaglia	Paul Ruggeri
Parallel bars	Danell Leyva	Chris Brooks	Ryan Lieberman Brandon Wynn
Horizontal bar	Chris Brooks	Paul Ruggeri	Danell Leyva

== Participants ==
The following individuals are participating in competition:

=== Senior ===
- Lauren Beers – Warren Center, Pennsylvania (Southern Tier)
- Rebecca Bross – Plano, Texas (WOGA)
- Bridgette Caquatto – Naperville, Illinois (Legacy Elite)
- Mackenzie Caquatto – Naperville, Illinois (Legacy Elite)
- Briley Casanova – Plano, Texas (WOGA)
- Kaitlyn Clark – Rancho Cucamonga, California (Precision)
- Rheagan Courville – Baton Rouge, Louisiana (Gymnasiana Inc.)
- Georgia Dabritz – Newburyport, Massachusetts (Ace Gymnastics Inc.)
- Chelsea Davis – Lakeway, Texas (Texas Dreams)
- Sophina DeJesus – Temecula, California (SCEGA Gymnastics)
- Kytra Hunter – Frederick, Maryland (Hill's Gymnastics)
- Brandie Jay – Fort Collins, Colorado (GK Gymnastics)
- Amanda Jetter – Milford, Ohio (Cincinnati Gymnastics)
- Mattie Larson – Los Angeles, California (All Olympia)
- Sophia Lee – Plano, Texas (WOGA Gymnastics)
- Jaclyn McCartin – West Covina, California (Charter Oak Gymnastics Gliders)
- Annette Miele – Easton, Pennsylvania (Parkettes)
- Aly Raisman – Needham, Massachusetts (Brestyan's)
- Alicia Sacramone – Winchester, Massachusetts (Brestyan's)
- Samantha Shapiro – Los Angeles, California (All Olympia)
- Bridget Sloan – Pittsboro, Indiana (Sharp's Gymnastics Academy)
- Morgan Smith – Clermont, Florida (Brandy Johnson's)
- Cassandra Whitcomb – Cincinnati, Ohio (Cincinnati Gymnastics)
- Vanessa Zamarripa – Shiloh, Illinois (UCLA Gymnastics)

=== Junior ===
- Kennedy Baker – Flower Mound, Texas (Texas Dreams)
- Alyssa Baumann – Plano, Texas (WOGA)
- Desi Borgese – Los Gatos, California (Airborne Gymnastics Training Center)
- Mackenzie Brannan – Austin, Texas (Capital Gymnastics Super Center)
- Brianna Brown – West Chester, Ohio (Cincinnati Gymnastics)
- Stefani Catour – Phoenix, Arizona (Desert Lights Gymnastics)
- Talia Chiarelli – Lexington, Massachusetts (Brestyan's American Gymnastics)
- Rachel Daum – Katy, Texas (Stars Gymnastics Training Center-Hous)
- Madison Desch – Lenexa, Kansas (GAGE)
- Gabby Douglas – Virginia Beach, Virginia (Excalibur Gymnastics)
- Brenna Dowell – Odessa, Missouri (GAGE)
- Peyton Ernst – Lewisville, Texas (Texas Dreams)
- Ericha Fassbender – Katy, Texas (Stars Gymnastics)
- Sarah Finnegan – Lake Lotawana, Missouri (GAGE)
- Ariana Guerra – League City, Texas (Stars Gymnastics)
- Napualani Hall – Olathe, Kansas (Kansas Gymnastics)
- Claire Hammen – Loveland, Colorado (GK Gymnastics)
- Amelia Hundley – Hamilton, Ohio (Cincinnati Gymnastics)
- Megan Jimenez – Temecula, California (Precision Gymnastics)
- Madison Kocian – Dallas, Texas (WOGA)
- Elizabeth LeDuc – Plano, Texas (WOGA)
- Lauren Marinez – Orlando, Florida (Orlando Metro Gymnastics)
- McKayla Maroney – Laguna Niguel, California (All Olympia)
- Mary Maxwell – Germantown, Tennessee (Texas Dreams)
- Grace McLaughlin – Allen, Texas (WOGA)
- Keely McNeer – West Des Moines, Iowa (Chow's)
- Abigail Milliet – Denton, Texas (Denton Gymnastics Academy)
- Hallie Mossett – Los Angeles, California (West Coast Elite Gymnastics)
- Katelyn Ohashi – Plano, Texas (WOGA)
- Samantha Partyka – Katy, Texas (Champions Gymnastics)
- Elizabeth Price – Coopersburg, Pennsylvania (Parkettes)
- Lexie Priessman – Cincinnati, Ohio (Cincinnati Gymnastics)
- Kyla Ross – Aliso Viejo, California (Gym-Max Gymnastics)
- Devin Sheridan – Temecula, California (SCEGA Gymnastics)
- Alyssa Shermetaro – Rochester Hills, Michigan (Olympia Gymnastics)
- Emma Sibson – Allen, Texas (Zenith Elite)
- MyKayla Skinner – Gilbert, Arizona (Desert Lights)
- Braie Speed – Schertz, Texas (Olympic Hills)
- Sabrina Vega – Carmel, New York (Dynamic Gymnastics)
- Kellie Wanamaker – Washington, New Jersey (Parkettes)
- Jessica Wang – Chino Hills, California (Precision Gymnastics)
- Jordyn Wieber – DeWitt, Michigan (Gedderts Twistars)
- Grace Williams – Linden, Michigan (Gedderts Twistars)
- McKenzie Wofford – McKinney, Texas (WOGA)
