= Jordyn Wieber =

American artistic gymnast and coach (born 1995)

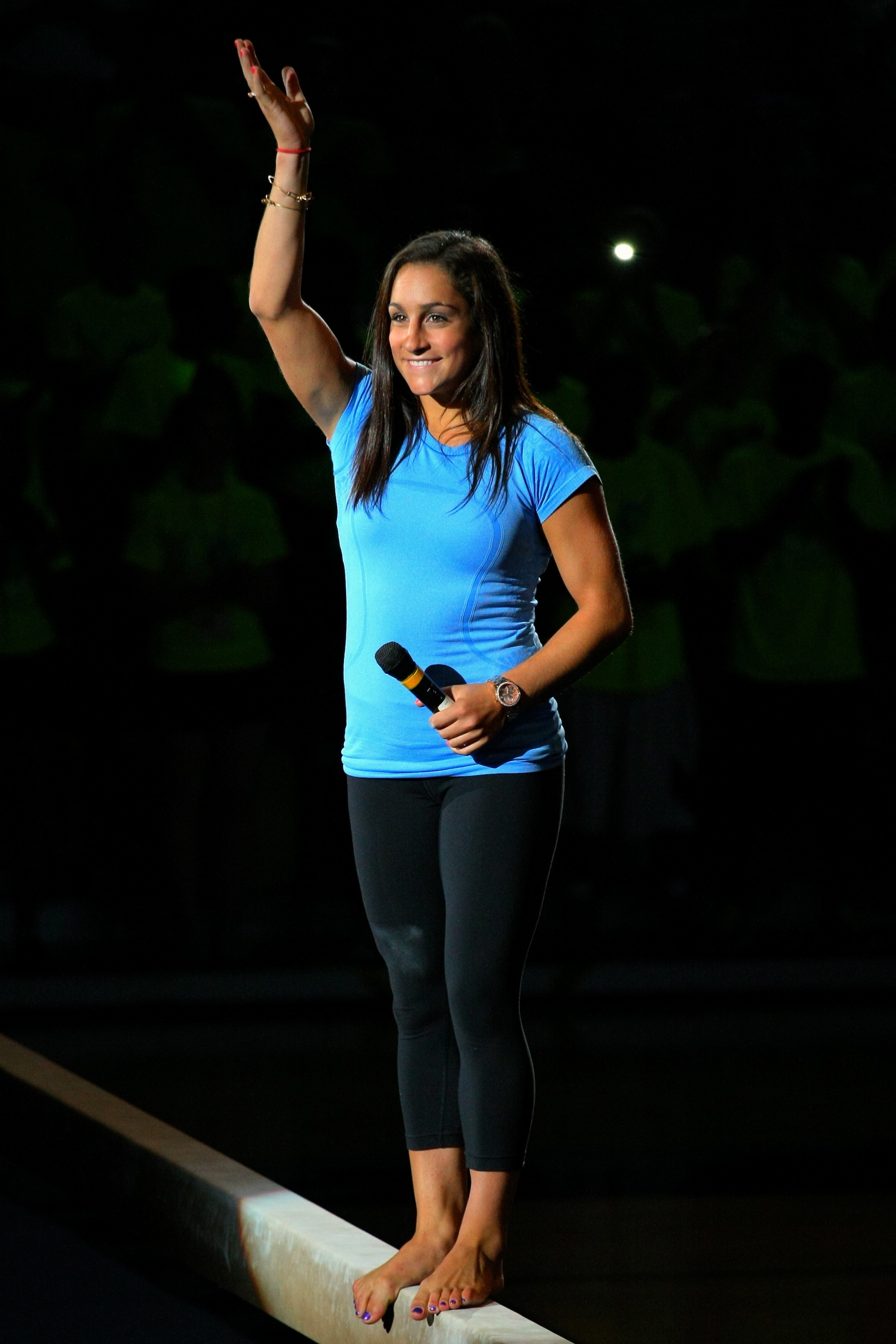
- Wieber in 2013

Personal information
- Full name: Jordyn Marie Wieber
- Nickname: Jo
- Born: July 12, 1995 (age 31) DeWitt, Michigan, U.S.
- Height: 5 ft 2 in (157 cm)
- Spouse: Chris Brooks (m. 2023)

Gymnastics career
- Discipline: Women's artistic gymnastics
- Country represented: United States; (2006–2012)
- Club: Gedderts Twistars USA
- Head coach: John Geddert
- Assistant coach: Kathryn Geddert
- Choreographer: Dominic Zito
- Retired: March 6, 2015
Medal record
Women's gymnastics
Representing the United States
Olympic Games
| Gold medal – first place | 2012 London | Team |
World Championships
| Gold medal – first place | 2011 Tokyo | Team |
| Gold medal – first place | 2011 Tokyo | All-around |
| Bronze medal – third place | 2011 Tokyo | Balance beam |
Pacific Rim Championships
| Gold medal – first place | 2010 Melbourne | Team |
| Gold medal – first place | 2012 Seattle | All-around |
| Gold medal – first place | 2012 Seattle | Floor exercise |
| Gold medal – first place | 2012 Seattle | Team |
FIG World Cup
Event / 1st / 2nd / 3rd; All-Around World Cup / 2 / 0 / 0
- Coaching career

Biographical details
- Education: University of California, Los Angeles

Coaching career (HC unless noted)
- 2017–2019: UCLA (Volunteer Asst.)
- 2020–2026: Arkansas

Jordyn Marie Wieber Brooks (née Wieber; born July 12, 1995) is an American former artistic gymnast and gymnastics coach. From April 2019 to April 2026, she was the head coach of the Arkansas Razorbacks gymnastics team.

Wieber began competing in elite gymnastics in 2006, at the age of 11, and made her international debut at the 2007 Junior Pan American Championships. She won the first junior national all-around title the following year and then won the 2009 American Cup, defeating senior competitors. She won the junior all-around title at the 2010 Pacific Rim Championships. She became age-eligible for senior competition in 2011 and won her first senior national all-around title. She then helped the U.S. team win the gold medal at the 2011 World Championships, where she also won the individual all-around title and was the bronze medalist on the balance beam. She successfully defended her national all-around title in 2012, and she was selected to compete at the 2012 Summer Olympics. The U.S. team, dubbed the Fierce Five, won the gold medal, but Wieber missed the all-around final due to the two-per-country rule.

Wieber did not compete again after the 2012 Summer Olympics and announced her retirement in 2015. Because she accepted sponsorship money during her elite career, she was ineligible to compete in NCAA gymnastics, but she still attended UCLA and became a manager for the gymnastics team. During her senior year, she became the volunteer assistant coach, a role she held for three seasons. She was then named the head coach for Arkansas, and in 2024, she led the team to a seventh-place finish at the NCAA Championships, their best result since 2012. She was inducted into the USA Gymnastics Hall of Fame in 2020.

== Early life ==
Wieber was born on July 12, 1995, in DeWitt, Michigan, the daughter of Rita (née Reifsnyder) Wieber, who is an emergency room nurse and exercise physiologist, and David Wieber, who is a director at a health-care subsidiary. She is the third oldest of four children, and her family attended the St. Jude Catholic Church in DeWitt. Her maternal grandmother is of Lebanese descent.

Wieber started gymnastics at a young age because her parents noticed she had an athletic build and great balance. She joined Gedderts Twistars USA, run by John Geddert and his wife Kathryn, at age four. By age ten, she had qualified for Level 10 in the Junior Olympic program and then qualified for the international elite level a year later in 2006. Beginning in sixth grade, she attended public school for part of the day and took her remaining classes online to accommodate her training schedule.

== Junior gymnastics career ==
=== 2006–2008: Beginnings ===
Wieber qualified to compete in junior elite competitions in 2006, at age 11, Her first elite meet was the 2006 U.S. Classic, and she placed tenth in the all-around and qualified for the U.S. National Championships, where she finished ninth. With these results, she was named to the U.S. national team for the first time.

In 2007, Wieber competed at the U.S. Classic, where she placed fifth in the all-around and won silver medals on the balance beam and vault. Then at the U.S. National Championships, Wieber won bronze in the all-around behind Rebecca Bross and Samantha Shapiro. Wieber was later named to the team to compete at the 2007 Junior Pan American Championships alongside Olivia Courtney, Mattie Larson, and Chelsea Davis. While there, Wieber helped the team win gold, and individually, she won silver in the all-around, behind Larson, gold on uneven bars and balance beam, and bronze on floor exercise.

In March 2008, Wieber was named to the team to compete at a USA-Canada-Italy-Netherlands Friendly Competition (now named the City of Jesolo Trophy). While there, she helped the team win gold and individually won gold in the all-around. She was named to the team to compete at the 2008 Pacific Rim Championships but had to withdraw due to injury. In June, Wieber won her first national all-around title. She also placed first on vault and floor exercise, second on balance beam, and third on uneven bars. She then traveled to Charleroi, Belgium, for the Top Gym competition, where she won the all-around title by nearly four points.

=== 2009–2010: Continued success ===
In February 2009, Wieber competed against senior gymnasts at the American Cup in Chicago, Illinois. Despite nearly injuring her knee on the Amanar vault, she won the all-around competition, beating 2008 Olympian Bridget Sloan. She was only 13 years old when she won the event, making her the second youngest American Cup champion after Tracee Talavera, who won in 1980. Later that year, Wieber competed at the International Gymnix, where she helped the team win gold, and individually, she placed first in the all-around and on all four apparatuses. She missed the rest of the 2009 season due to a torn hamstring, including the U.S. National Championships.

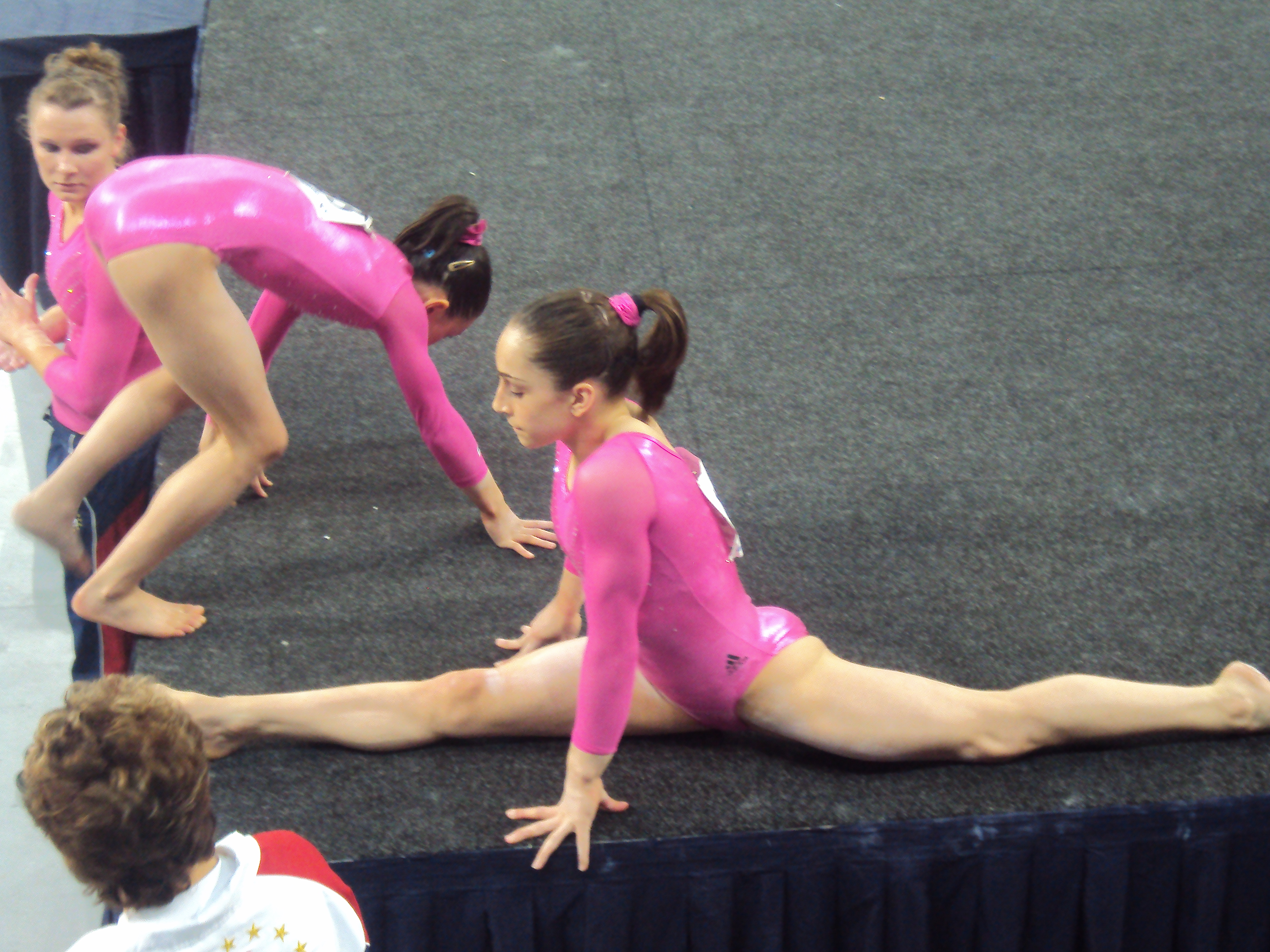
Wieber stretching at the 2010 Pacific Rims Championships

In April 2010, she was named to the team to compete at the Pacific Rim Championships in Melbourne, Australia, alongside seniors Aly Raisman, Rebecca Bross, and Bridget Sloan and fellow juniors Kyla Ross and Sabrina Vega. While there, she helped the American team place first. Individually, she won the junior all-around competition with a score of 59.550, finishing ahead of Ross, Vega, and Russian Anna Rodionova. She also won gold medals on the uneven bars and floor exercise and won a silver medal on vault behind future Olympic teammate Ross. She also placed fourth on the balance beam.

Later that year, Wieber competed at the U.S. Classic in Chicago, Illinois. She won the all-around competition with a score of 59.950. She also won gold medals on the vault and uneven bars, a silver medal on floor exercise behind Katelyn Ohashi, and placed sixth on balance beam. In August, Wieber attended the U.S. National Championships but injured her ankle on the balance beam and withdrew from competition. Even though she was unable to finish the competition, she was still named to the junior national team.

== Senior gymnastics career ==
=== 2011: World champion ===
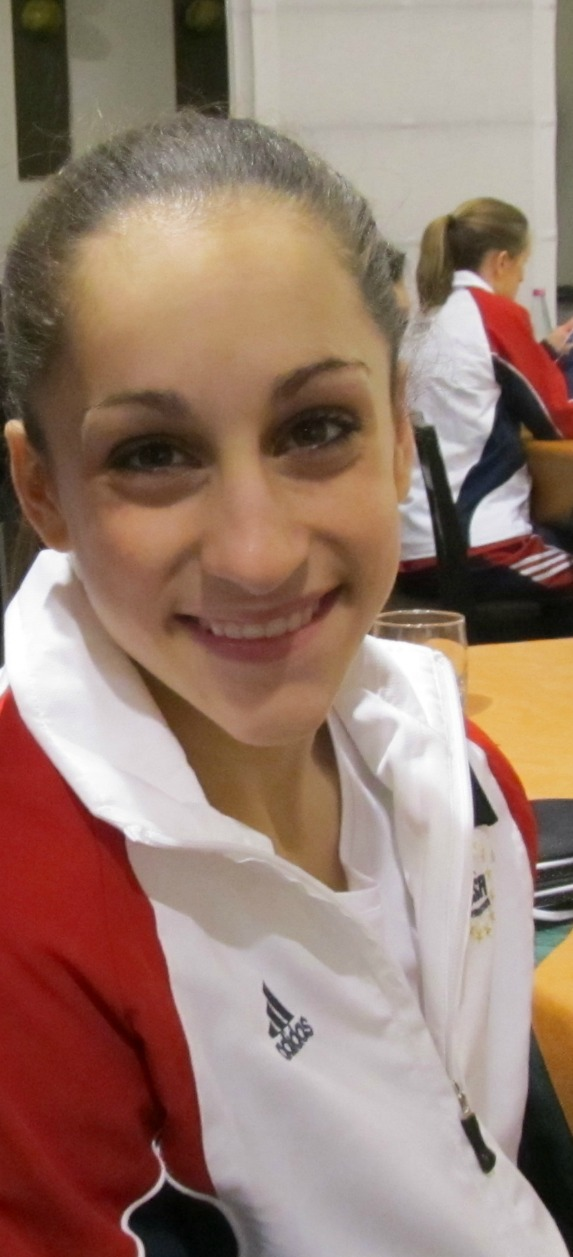
Wieber at the 2011 City of Jesolo Trophy

Wieber participated in her first senior elite competition at the American Cup in Jacksonville, Florida, where she filled in for British gymnast Nicole Hibbert, who was injured. Despite falling off the uneven bars, she won the all-around competition, beating the reigning World all-around champion Aliya Mustafina. Later the same month, she competed at the City of Jesolo Trophy in Jesolo, Italy. She placed second behind teammate McKayla Maroney in the all-around competition. The Americans also won the team title. At the U.S. Classic, she only competed on the uneven bars and balance beam, finishing first in both events.

In August, Wieber competed at the U.S. National Championships in Saint Paul, Minnesota. She had the lead in the all-around competition after the first day despite struggles on the uneven bars and balance beam. She had a much better competition on the second day, and she won the all-around title by over six points ahead of runner-up Maroney. She also won the national titles on the uneven bars and floor exercise and a bronze medal on the balance beam.

Wieber was selected to compete at the 2011 World Championships in Tokyo alongside Maroney, Sabrina Vega, Aly Raisman, Gabby Douglas, and Alicia Sacramone. She contributed on all four apparatuses toward the American team's gold medal win by over four points ahead of Russia. In the all-around final, Wieber overarched a handstand on the uneven bars and stepped out of bounds on the floor exercise. Despite these errors, she won the all-around title by only 0.033 points ahead of Russia's Viktoria Komova, thanks to her higher difficulty start-values. She went on to win the bronze medal in the balance beam final, behind Chinese gymnasts Sui Lu and Yao Jinnan, and she placed fourth on the uneven bars and sixth on the floor exercise.

=== 2012: Olympic champion ===
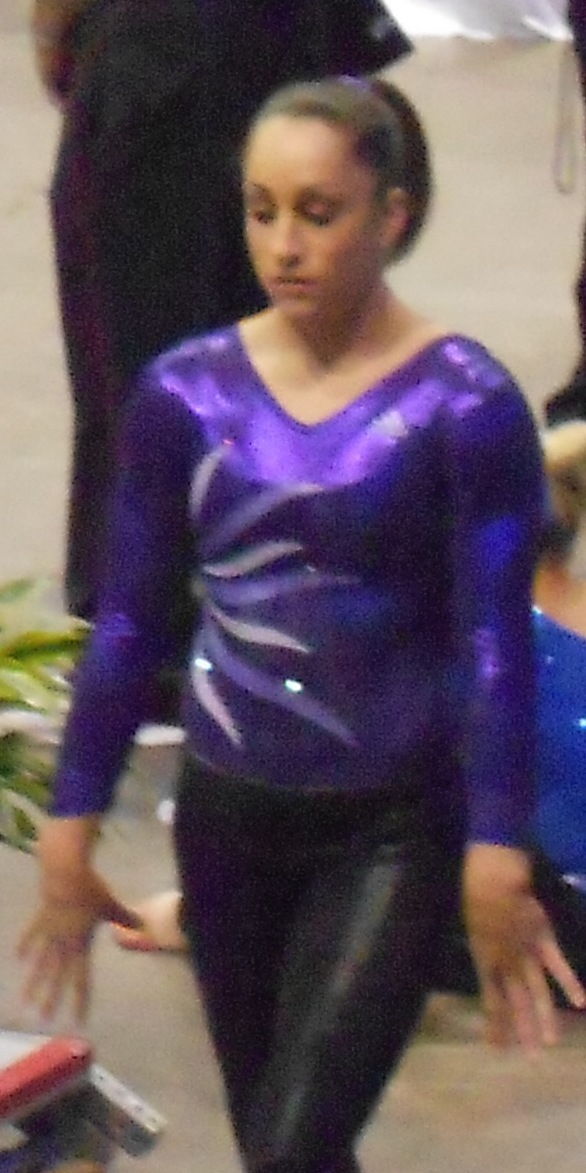
Wieber at the 2012 U.S. Classic

At the beginning of March, Wieber competed at the American Cup in New York City, New York. She successfully defended her all-around title, although Gabby Douglas outscored her but was not officially part of the competition. Later that month, she competed at the Pacific Rim Championships in Everett, Washington. She helped the American team place first by nearly 20 points ahead of China, and individually, she won the all-around competition. In the event finals, she placed sixth on balance beam after a fall and won the gold medal on the floor exercise.

Wieber only competed on two apparatuses at the U.S. Classic, tying with Aly Raisman for the balance beam title and placing eighth on the uneven bars. She then competed at the U.S. National Championships in St. Louis, Missouri as the defending all-around champion. After the first day of competition, Wieber and Douglas were tied for first place in the all-around. However, Wieber pulled ahead on the second day to successfully defend her national title. As a result, Wieber was named to the national team and selected to compete at the Olympic Trials. Additionally, she won the silver medal on the floor exercise behind Raisman and placed fifth on both the uneven bars and the balance beam.

In early July, Wieber competed at the Olympic Trials in San Jose, California. She had a strong performance on the first day of competition and was in the lead for the all-around. However, she slipped behind Douglas on the second day of competition. She also finished second on the floor exercise to Raisman and tied with Kyla Ross for the bronze medal on the balance beam. Wieber was selected to represent the United States at the 2012 Summer Olympics alongside Douglas, Raisman, Ross, and McKayla Maroney. The team was featured on the cover of Sports Illustrated on the July 18, 2012, "Olympic Preview" issue. This marked the first time an entire Olympic gymnastics team had been featured on the cover of Sports Illustrated.

==== London Olympics ====
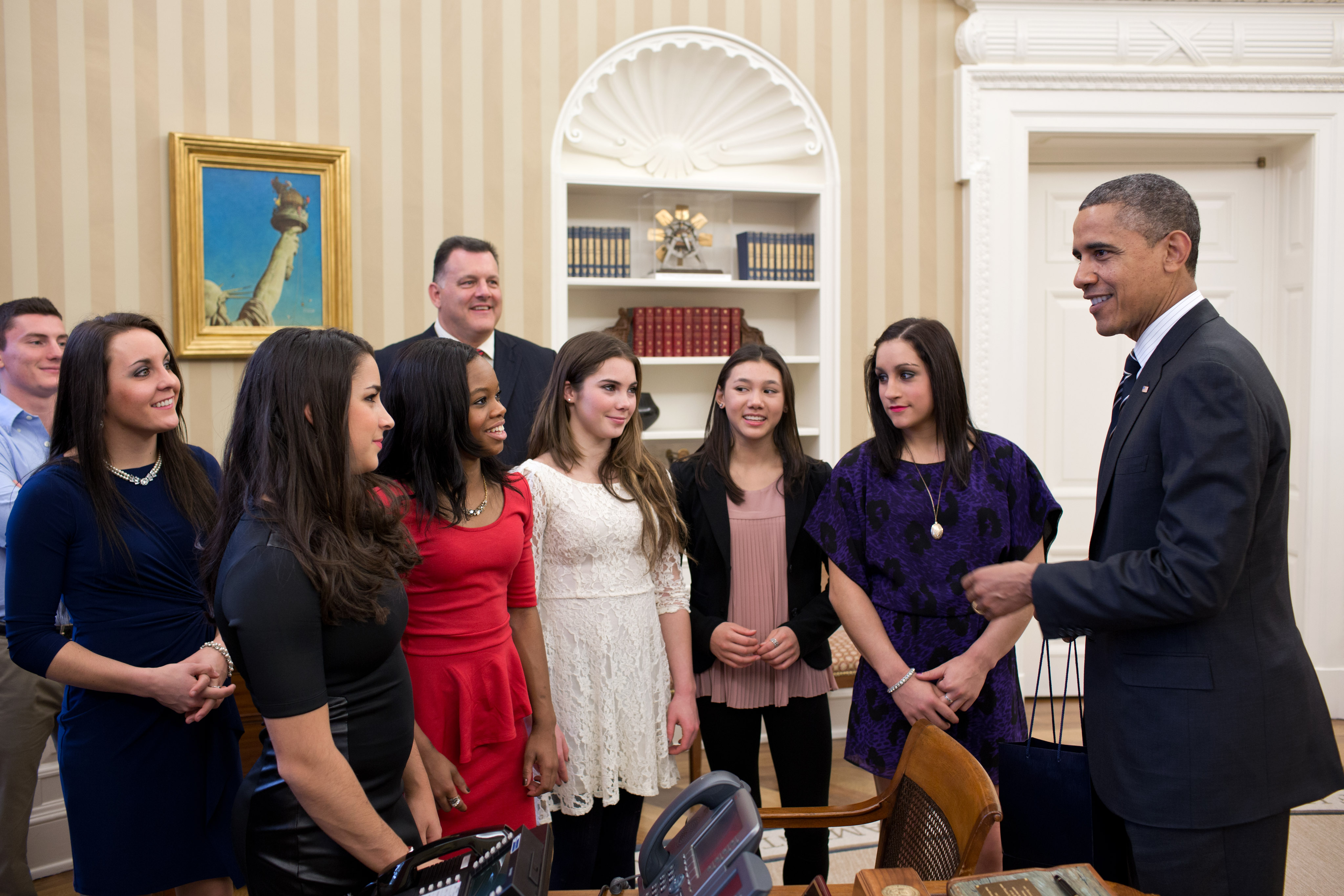
Fierce Five members meeting President Barack Obama

At the end of July, Wieber competed at the 2012 Summer Olympics in London, United Kingdom. In the qualification round, the American team, nicknamed the "Fierce Five", qualified for the team final in first place. However, Wieber finished fourth in the qualification for the all-around final, behind Viktoria Komova, Raisman, and Douglas. Because of the rule limiting countries to having a maximum of two competitors in individual finals, Wieber did not advance to the all-around final. Wieber did advance to the floor exercise final in sixth place.

In the team final, Wieber contributed on the vault, uneven bars, and floor exercise toward the American team's first-place finish. They became the second U.S. team, after the "Magnificent Seven" in 1996, to win the team competition. Wieber described feeling disappointed after failing to qualify for the all-around final but knew she had to "put it together mentally" to help the team win the gold medal.

In the floor exercise final, Wieber placed seventh after going out of bounds on her second tumbling pass. After the Olympics, Wieber shared that she had been competing with a stress fracture in her right leg caused by a heel injury, which limited her training and impacted her performance.

=== Post-Olympics ===
After the Olympic Games, Wieber performed on the 40-city Kellogg's Tour of Gymnastics Champions. Because Wieber accepted sponsorship money after her World Championships win, she forfeited her NCAA eligibility. However, Valorie Kondos Field, head coach of the UCLA gymnastics team, offered her a team manager role. Wieber accepted the offer and enrolled at UCLA in the fall of 2013 to study psychology. During her first year, Wieber continued to train alone in UCLA's facilities with the intention of returning to elite competition. On March 6, 2015, Wieber announced her retirement from elite gymnastics, stating that she "felt fulfilled" with her career.

== Coaching career ==
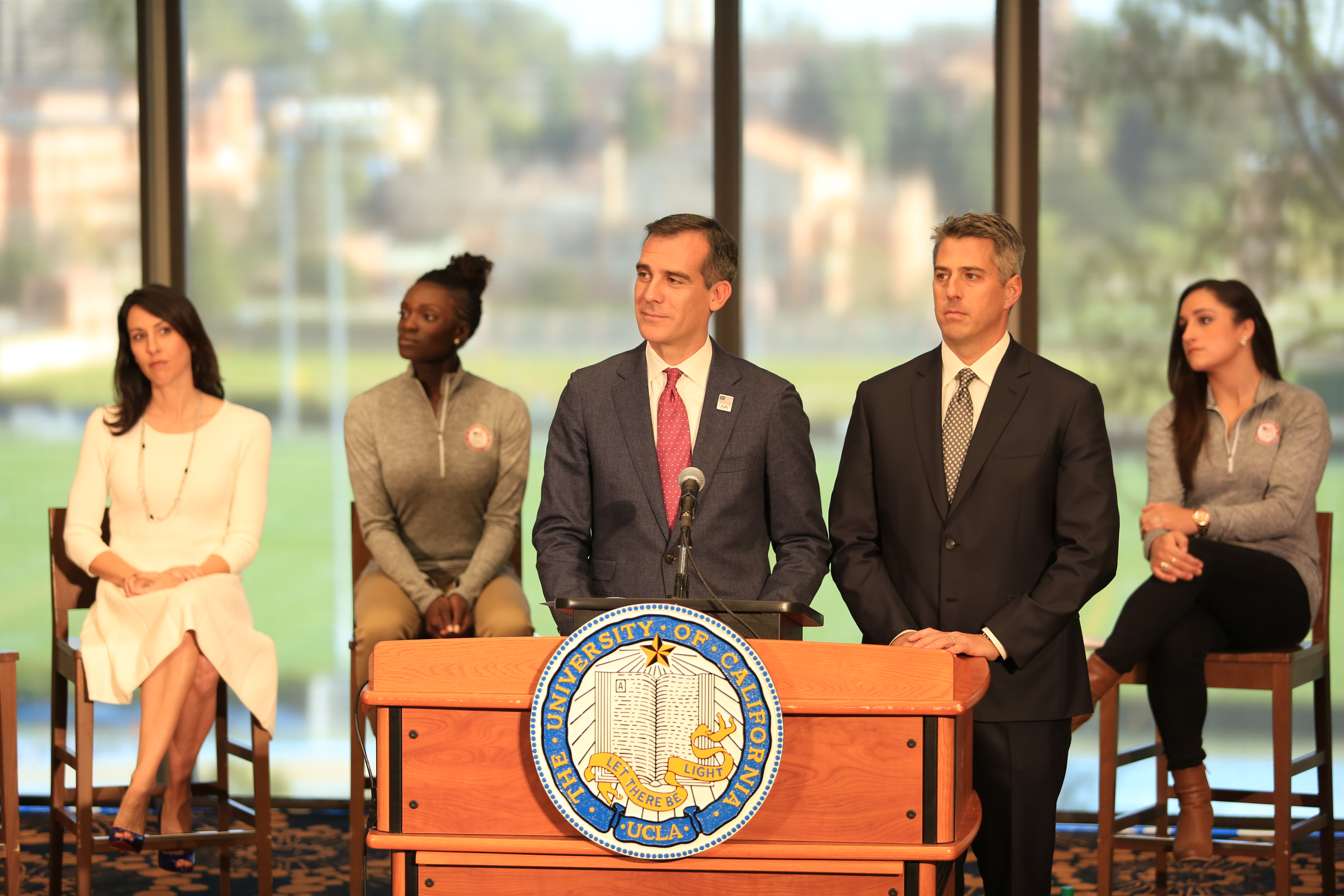
Wieber (right) in 2016 for the announcement of the Los Angeles 2024 Olympic Bid

=== UCLA: 2016–2019 ===
During her senior year of college, Wieber became a volunteer assistant coach at UCLA for the 2016–17 season. She continued this role after graduation, throughout the 2017–18 and 2018–19 seasons. She served as the floor exercise coach for the Bruins, helping them finish the 2018 and 2019 regular seasons ranked number 1 on the event. She, along with fellow UCLA assistant coaches Chris Waller and Randy Lane, won the West Region Assistant Coaches of the Year award for 2018. That year, UCLA won its first national team title since 2010.

=== Arkansas: 2019–2026 ===
On April 24, 2019, Wieber became the head coach for the Arkansas Razorbacks gymnastics program, the first Olympic champion gymnast to take the helm of a collegiate women's gymnastics program. At the age of 23, Wieber was the youngest NCAA gymnastics head coach. Her first home meet saw a then-record crowd of 6,714 in a loss against the Denver Pioneers. Her first season as a head coach was cut short due to the COVID-19 pandemic, but Arkansas ended the year ranked ninth in the NCAA.

In the 2021 season, Arkansas qualified to compete in the evening session of the SEC Championships for the first time, finishing in seventh place. Their season ended at the NCAA Regional Finals. The gymnastics team competed in Bud Walton Arena for the first time in the 2022 season and set a new attendance record of 10,345. That year, the team finished sixth at the SEC Championships and advanced to the NCAA Regional Finals. The team once again set an attendance record in Bud Walton Arena in 2023 with 11,031 fans. At the conclusion of the 2023 season, Wieber received a contract extension through 2028.

During the 2024 season, Arkansas set a new program record team score of 198.100 in a win against the Nebraska Cornhuskers. Arkansas then hosted the NCAA Regionals and advanced to the NCAA Championships for the first time since 2018. There, they finished in seventh place, marking the program's highest finish since 2012.

During the 2025 season, Arkansas beat the reigning NCAA champions, the No. 2 ranked LSU Tigers. This upset was the biggest of Wieber's coaching era and the highest-ranked since Arkansas took down the No. 1 Florida Gators in 2011. Two weeks later, Wieber led the Razorbacks to another upset, this time taking down the newly ranked No. 2 Florida Gators.

At the conclusion of the 2026 season, Wieber announced that she was stepping down as head coach in order "to focus on [her] family and other passions".

== Awards and honors ==
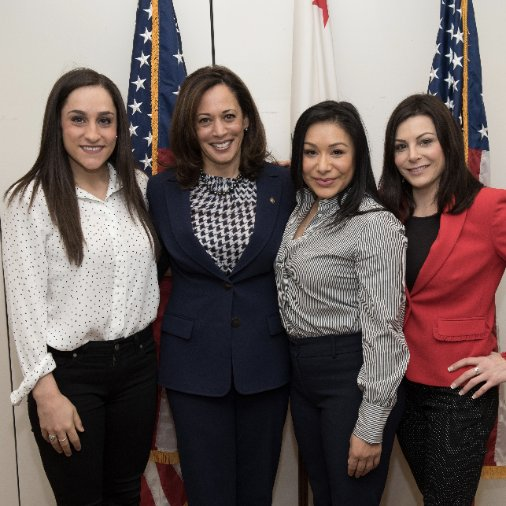
Wieber (left) with Kamala Harris, Jeanette Antolin, and Jamie Dantzscher, in 2018

Wieber was a finalist for the 2011 James E. Sullivan Award, which is given annually by the Amateur Athletic Union. She was named the USOPC Athlete of the Month for both October 2011 and June 2012. She was inducted into the Greater Lansing Sports Hall of Fame in 2016, after they changed the criteria to allow her to be inducted less than four years after her career ended.

On January 19, 2018, Wieber testified in court that she was sexually abused by the long-term team doctor of USA Gymnastics, Larry Nassar. Later that year, it was announced that Wieber and other survivors would be awarded the Arthur Ashe Courage Award. Also in 2018, the Los Angeles Business Journal selected her for the Rising Star Award.

Wieber was inducted into the Michigan Sports Hall of Fame in 2020. She was also inducted into the USA Gymnastics Hall of Fame in 2020, but she declined to attend the ceremony due to USA Gymnastics' handling of the sexual abuse.

== Television appearances ==
In January 2012, Wieber appeared on The Ellen DeGeneres Show. After the 2012 Summer Olympics, she appeared alongside the Fierce Five on The Today Show and Late Show with David Letterman. The Fierce Five also performed on Dancing with the Stars in support of 2008 Olympic gymnast Shawn Johnson. In 2025, she appeared on the third season of Special Forces: World's Toughest Test. She voluntarily withdrew from the competition in the third episode.

== Personal life ==
Wieber began dating 2016 Olympian Chris Brooks in 2017. The couple announced their engagement on October 5, 2021. They married on May 28, 2023, and Wieber's Fierce Five teammates Aly Raisman and Kyla Ross attended. In late 2024, Wieber and her husband announced that they are expecting their first child together; their daughter was born in June 2025.

== Competitive history ==
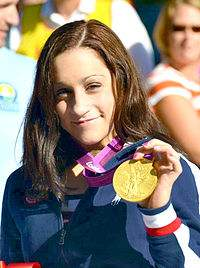
Wieber at a parade after the 2012 Summer Olympics

Competitive history of Jordyn Wieber at the junior level
| Year | Event | Team | AA | VT | UB | BB | FX |
|---|---|---|---|---|---|---|---|
| 2006 | U.S. Classic | | 10 | | | | |
| 2006 | U.S. National Championships | | 9 | 19 | 13 | 9 | 19 |
| 2007 | U.S. Classic | | 5 | 2nd place, silver medalist(s) | 12 | 2nd place, silver medalist(s) | 18 |
| 2007 | U.S. National Championships | | 3rd place, bronze medalist(s) | 2nd place, silver medalist(s) | 3rd place, bronze medalist(s) | 2nd place, silver medalist(s) | 9 |
| 2007 | Pan American Championships | 1st place, gold medalist(s) | 2nd place, silver medalist(s) | | 1st place, gold medalist(s) | 1st place, gold medalist(s) | 3rd place, bronze medalist(s) |
| 2008 | City of Jesolo Trophy | 1st place, gold medalist(s) | 1st place, gold medalist(s) | | | | |
| 2008 | U.S. Classic | | 1st place, gold medalist(s) | 1st place, gold medalist(s) | 1st place, gold medalist(s) | 1st place, gold medalist(s) | 1st place, gold medalist(s) |
| 2008 | U.S. National Championships | | 1st place, gold medalist(s) | 1st place, gold medalist(s) | 3rd place, bronze medalist(s) | 2nd place, silver medalist(s) | 1st place, gold medalist(s) |
| 2008 | Top Gym | | 1st place, gold medalist(s) | | | | |
| 2009 | American Cup | | 1st place, gold medalist(s) | | | | |
| 2009 | International Gymnix | 1st place, gold medalist(s) | 1st place, gold medalist(s) | 1st place, gold medalist(s) | 1st place, gold medalist(s) | 1st place, gold medalist(s) | 1st place, gold medalist(s) |
| 2010 | Pacific Rim Championships | 1st place, gold medalist(s) | 1st place, gold medalist(s) | 2nd place, silver medalist(s) | 1st place, gold medalist(s) | 4 | 1st place, gold medalist(s) |
| 2010 | U.S. Classic | | 1st place, gold medalist(s) | 1st place, gold medalist(s) | 1st place, gold medalist(s) | 6 | 2nd place, silver medalist(s) |
| 2010 | U.S. National Championships | | DNF | | | | |

Competitive history of Jordyn Wieber at the senior level
| Year | Event | Team | AA | VT | UB | BB | FX |
|---|---|---|---|---|---|---|---|
| 2011 | American Cup | | 1st place, gold medalist(s) | | | | |
| 2011 | City of Jesolo Trophy | 1st place, gold medalist(s) | 2nd place, silver medalist(s) | 2nd place, silver medalist(s) | 3rd place, bronze medalist(s) | 2nd place, silver medalist(s) | |
| 2011 | U.S. Classic | | | | 1st place, gold medalist(s) | 1st place, gold medalist(s) | |
| 2011 | U.S. National Championships | | 1st place, gold medalist(s) | | 1st place, gold medalist(s) | 3rd place, bronze medalist(s) | 1st place, gold medalist(s) |
| 2011 | World Championships | 1st place, gold medalist(s) | 1st place, gold medalist(s) | | 4 | 3rd place, bronze medalist(s) | 6 |
| 2012 | American Cup | | 1st place, gold medalist(s) | | | | |
| 2012 | Pacific Rim Championships | 1st place, gold medalist(s) | 1st place, gold medalist(s) | | | 6 | 1st place, gold medalist(s) |
| 2012 | U.S. Classic | | | | 8 | 1st place, gold medalist(s) | |
| 2012 | U.S. National Championships | | 1st place, gold medalist(s) | | 5 | 5 | 2nd place, silver medalist(s) |
| 2012 | Olympic Trials | | 2nd place, silver medalist(s) | | 4 | 3rd place, bronze medalist(s) | 2nd place, silver medalist(s) |
| 2012 | Olympic Games | 1st place, gold medalist(s) | | | | | 7 |
