= Gymnastics at the 2012 Summer Olympics – Women's balance beam =

Women's balance beam competition at the 2012 Summer Olympics

Women's balance beam at the Games of the XXX Olympiad
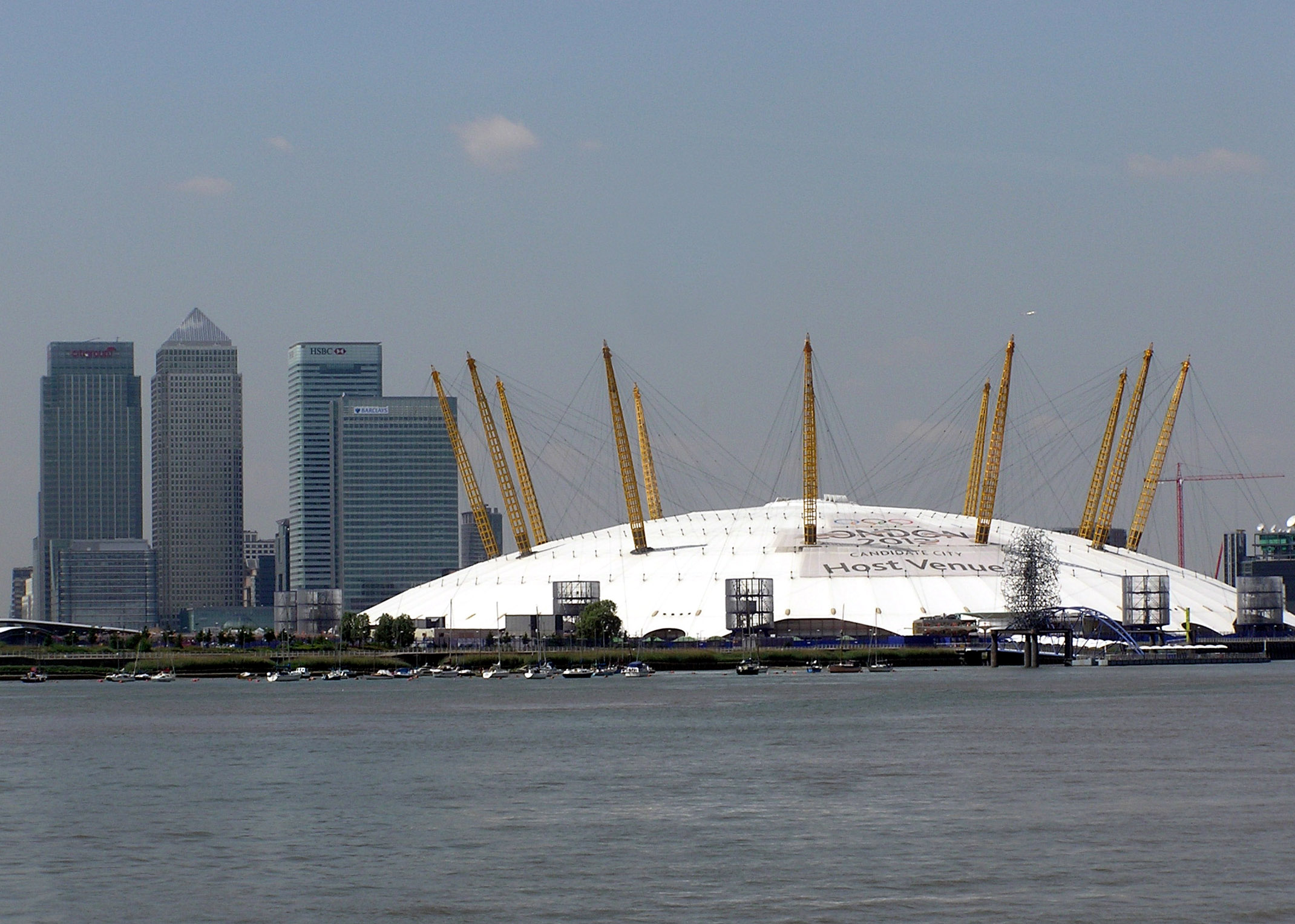
- Canary wharf and dome London
- Venue: North Greenwich Arena
- Date: 7 August 2012
- Competitors: 8 from 4 nations
- Winning points: 15.600

Medalists
1st place, gold medalist(s)		Deng Linlin	China
2nd place, silver medalist(s)		Sui Lu	China
3rd place, bronze medalist(s)		Aly Raisman	United States

The women's balance beam competition at the 2012 Summer Olympics in London was held at the North Greenwich Arena on 7 August. Deng Linlin of China took gold, Sui Lu of China took silver, and Aly Raisman of the United States took the bronze via a tie-breaker.

== Format of competition ==
The top eight competitors in the qualification phase (with a limit of two per country) advanced to the final. Qualification scores were then ignored, with only final-round scores counting.

== Final results ==
Oldest and youngest competitors

	Gymnast	Nation	Date of birth	Age
Oldest competitor	Cătălina Ponor	Romania	20 August 1987	24 years
Youngest competitor	Larisa Iordache	Romania	19 June 1996	16 years

Rank	Gymnast	Nation	D Score	E Score	Pen.	Total
1st place, gold medalist(s)	Deng Linlin	China	6.600	9.000		15.600
2nd place, silver medalist(s)	Sui Lu	China	6.500	9.000		15.500
3rd place, bronze medalist(s)	Aly Raisman	United States	6.300	8.766		15.066
4	Cătălina Ponor	Romania	6.600	8.466		15.066
5	Ksenia Afanasyeva	Russia	5.800	8.783		14.583
6	Larisa Iordache	Romania	6.400	7.800		14.200
7	Gabby Douglas	United States	6.000	7.633		13.633
8	Viktoria Komova	Russia	6.200	6.966		13.166

== Qualification results ==
Rank	Gymnast	Nation	D Score	E Score	Pen.	Total	Qual.
1	Sui Lu	China	6.400	9.000		15.400	Q
2	Viktoria Komova	Russia	6.400	8.866		15.266	Q
3	Gabby Douglas	United States	6.500	8.766		15.266	Q
4	Deng Linlin	China	6.500	8.666		15.166	Q
5	Aly Raisman	United States	6.400	8.700		15.100	Q
6	Kyla Ross	United States	6.100	8.975		15.075	-
7	Ksenia Afanasyeva	Russia	5.900	9.166		15.066	Q
8	Cătălina Ponor	Romania	6.400	8.633		15.033	Q
9	Anastasia Grishina	Russia	6.000	8.900		14.900	-
10	Diana Bulimar	Romania	6.100	8.766		14.866	Q
11	Larisa Iordache	Romania	6.400	8.400		14.800	-
12	Aliya Mustafina	Russia	6.000	8.700		14.700	-
12	Jordyn Wieber	United States	6.000	8.700		14.700	-
14	Sandra Izbașa	Romania	5.800	8.800		14.600	-
15	Asuka Teramoto	Japan	5.700	8.766		14.466	R
16	Vanessa Ferrari	Italy	6.100	8.333		14.433	R
17	Carlotta Ferlito	Italy	6.000	8.425		14.425	R

* Kyla Ross (USA), ranked 6th, and Anastasia Grishina (RUS), ranked 9th, did not advance to the final because of the two-per-country rule.

* Larisa Iordache (ROU), Aliya Mustafina (RUS), Jordyn Wieber (USA), and Sandra Izbașa (ROU) ranked 11th, 12th, 12th, and 14th, respectively, but did not qualify as reserves because of the two-per-country rule. On 6 August, Diana Bulimar gave up her spot to Iordache, whom Bulimar believed had a better chance of medaling.

1. Raisman was initially given a D score of 6.200 for a total score of 14.966. However, on appeal, her D score was raised to 6.300 for a total score of 15.066 and a third-place tie with Ponor. The tie was broken based on Raisman's higher E score.
