= List of Women's At-Large Academic All-America Team Members of the Year =

Student athlete award

The Women's At-Large Academic All-America Team Members of the Year is the annual most outstanding singular female collegiate athlete selected from the combined at-large sports pool. Presented annually by College Sports Communicators since the expansion of the program, the honor represents the highest academic and athletic achievement across non-major standalone sports. Selections are divided across five distinct program tiers: NCAA Division I, Division II, Division III, NAIA, and the College Division.

The College Division consists of two-year colleges, Canadian institutions, and any other instituation not affiliated with the NCAA or NAIA.

== Tables of winners ==
Key
†	Indicates winners of the all-sports Academic All-America award.

All winners are American unless indicated otherwise.

Women's At-Large Academic All-America Team Members of the Year
- Awarded for: The yearly outstanding female college athlete at-large Academic All-America team member
- Country: United States and Canada
- Presented by: College Sports Communicators

History
- Most recent: Maggie Boyd, UCLA; Katie Lange, Grand Valley State; Caroline Adams, Middlebury; Koral Hadac, Cumberlands; Emma Jensen, Northwest Mississippi CC
- Next ceremony: July 2027
- Website: Official site

=== Two-division era (1987–2011) ===
Female At-large Academic All-America Team Members of the Year (1987–2011)
Year	University Division			College Division			Ref
Year	Winner	School	Sport	Winner	School	Sport	Ref
1987–88	Jacque Struckhoff	Kansas State	Cross country/Track and field	Marcy Erickson	Saint Benedict	Tennis	
1988–89	Vicki Huber	Villanova	Track and field	Marcy Erickson	Saint Benedict	Tennis	
1989–90	Gea Johnson	Arizona State	Track and field	Kathryn L. Cottingham	Drew	Lacrosse	
1990–91	Sandra Birch	Stanford	Tennis	Peggy Fortune	Baldwin Wallace	Cross country/Track and field/Swimming	
1991–92	Sigall Kassutto	California	Gymnastics	Rebecca Galassini	Grand Canyon	Tennis	
1992–93	Nnenna Lynch	Villanova	Cross country/Track and field	Christie Allen	Pittsburg State	Cross country/Track and field	
1993–94	Margo Evashevski	Oregon State	Golf	Carla Ainsworth	Kenyon	Swimming	
1994–95	Cheril Santini	SMU	Swimming	Carla Ainsworth	Kenyon	Swimming	
1995–96 (Fall/Winter)	Joy Taylor	Nebraska	Gymnastics	Jennifer Cortese	Trenton State	Field hockey	
1995–96 (Spring)	(Guyana) Nicola Martial	Nebraska	Track and field	Michele Mohlman	Goucher	Lacrosse	
1995–96 (Spring)	Katie Swords	SMU	Track and field	Michele Mohlman	Goucher	Lacrosse	
1996–97 (Fall/Winter)	Jennifer Renola	Notre Dame	Soccer	Kristin Goldthorpe	Denison	Swimming	
1996–97 (Spring)	Janet Blomstedt	Nebraska	Track and field	Amy Bippert	Angelo State	Track and field	
1997–98 (Fall/Winter)	Kathy Pesek	Tennessee	Swimming	Sharon Sanborn	Case Western Reserve	Swimming	
1997–98 (Spring)	Katie Ollendick	Virginia Tech	Track and field	Rebecca Tucker	Brockport	Lacrosse	
1998–99 (Fall/Winter)	Erin Baxter	Florida	Soccer	(Finland) Pauliina Miettinen	Franklin Pierce	Soccer	
1998–99 (Spring)	(Bulgaria) Dora Djilianova	Fresno State	Tennis	Deandra Doubrava	Emporia State	Track and field	
1999–2000 (Fall/Winter)	(Zimbabwe) Sally Northcroft	Ball State	Field hockey	Katie Gardinier	Westmont	Soccer	
1999–2000 (Spring)	(Australia) Jen Adams	Maryland	Lacrosse	Kate L'Armand	Widener	Track and field	
2000–01 (Fall/Winter)	Kim Black	Georgia	Swimming	Andrea Pawliczek	Emory	Soccer	
2000–01 (Spring)	Andrea Neary Dutoit	Arizona	Track and field	Brooke Andrews	Emory	Lacrosse	
2001–02	Theresa Kulikowski	Utah	Gymnastics	Jenna Calomeris	Wingate	Tennis	
2002–03	Theresa Kulikowski†	Utah	Gymnastics	Ashley Rowatt†	Kenyon	Swimming	
2003–04	Stephanie Kite	Alabama	Gymnastics	Colleen Barber	Skidmore	Field hockey	
2004–05	Courtney Koester	Northwestern	Lacrosse	Sarah Dance	Truman State	Swimming	
2005–06	(Canada) Sara Bauer	Wisconsin	Ice hockey	(Australia) Tammy Leane	West Chester	Swimming	
2006–07	(Canada) Sara Bauer	Wisconsin	Ice hockey	Jamie Wolf†	Clarion	Swimming	
2007–08	Kristi Miller	Georgia Tech	Tennis	Sue Ackermann	Salisbury	Lacrosse	
2008–09	Hilary Bowen	Northwestern	Lacrosse	Kristen Hohl	Denison	Swimming	
2009–10	Justine Schluntz†	Arizona	Swimming	Chelsea Hoff	Wisconsin–La Crosse	Swimming	
2010–11	Kayla Hoffman	Alabama	Gymnastics	(Sweden) Marianne Andersson	Florida Southern	Golf	

=== Four-division era (2011–18) ===
Female At-large Academic All-America Team Members of the Year (2011–2018)
Year	Division I			Division II			Division III			College			Ref
Year	Winner	School	Sport	Winner	School	Sport	Winner	School	Sport	Winner	School	Sport	Ref
2011–12	Brooke Pancake†	Alabama	Golf	Catherine Leix	Wayne State	Swimming	Celena Dopart	WPI	Field hockey	(Canada) Hayley Wickenheiser	Calgary	Ice hockey	
2012–13	Elizabeth Beisel	Florida	Swimming	Julie Widmann	Ashland	Swimming	(Canada) Teal Gove	Plattsburgh State	Ice hockey	Ashlan Allison	Olivet Nazarene	Tennis	
2013–14	Kim Jacob†	Alabama	Gymnastics	Kristin Day	Clarion	Swimming	(North Macedonia) Anastasia Bogdanovski	Johns Hopkins	Swimming	(Czech Republic) Kristina Marova	Embry–Riddle (FL)	Tennis	
2014–15	Missy Franklin	California	Swimming	Kristin Day†	Clarion	Swimming	(North Macedonia) Anastasia Bogdanovski	Johns Hopkins	Swimming	Christine Tixier	Biola	Swimming	
2015–16	Lauren Beers	Alabama	Gymnastics	Maria Hundley	Seattle Pacific	Gymnastics	Margaret Guo	MIT	Swimming	Lori Haas	Purdue–Calumet	Tennis	
2016–17	Sarah Gibson†	Texas A&M	Swimming	(Germany) Marie Coors†	Saint Leo	Golf	Meg Stanley	Illinois Wesleyan	Swimming	(Germany) Wiebke Schlender	Indiana Tech	Golf	
2016–17	Katie Ledecky†	Stanford	Swimming	(Canada) Annika Haynes	Indianapolis	Golf	Julia Wilson	Kenyon	Swimming	Christina Klouda	Cumberlands	Swimming	

=== Five-division era (2018–present) ===
Female At-large Academic All-America Team Members of the Year (2018–present)
Year	Division I			Division II			Division III			NAIA			College			Ref
Year	Winner	School	Sport	Winner	School	Sport	Winner	School	Sport	Winner	School	Sport	Winner	School	Sport	Ref
2018–19	Makenzie Fischer	Stanford	Water polo	(Argentina) Catalina Berraud-Galea	Lynn	Swimming	Lauren O'Malley	John Carroll	Tennis	Christina Klouda†	Cumberlands	Swimming	(Canada) Margaret Pham†	British Columbia	Field hockey	
2019–20	Asia Seidt	Kentucky	Swimming	Amanda Kautzer†	Michigan Tech	Skiing	KT Kustritz	Denison	Swimming	Carly Ferguson	Missouri Baptist	Golf	(Guyana) Joanna Archer	Monroe	Track and field	
2020–21	Brooke Forde	Stanford	Swimming	Rachel Massaro†	Queens	Swimming	Mikayla Bisignani	Johns Hopkins	Track and field	Maria Genovese	Georgia Gwinnett	Tennis	Alyssa O'Donnell	Florida SouthWestern	Softball	
2021–22	Makenzie Fischer	Stanford	Water polo	(South Africa) Marizel van Jaarsveld	Indianapolis	Swimming	Crile Hart	Kenyon	Swimming	(Argentina) Stephanie Petit	Montreat	Tennis	(Guyana) Aaliyah Moore	Monroe	Track and field	
2022–23	Aria Fischer	Stanford	Water polo	Daisy Woodring	Texas Woman's	Gymnastics	Karen Alvarez	UT Dallas	Golf	Jordan Haeusser	Missouri Baptist	Lacrosse	Jordan Harrison	Johnson County	Softball	
2023–24	(Sweden) Hannah Abrahamsson	Colorado	Skiing	Allie Bianchi	Henderson State	Golf	Lexi Onsrud	Illinois Wesleyan	Golf	Lara Kurt	SCAD Savannah	Bowling	Courtney Donahue	Des Moines Area CC	Softball	
2024–25	Grace McCallum	Utah	Gymnastics	Madison Murr	Cal State San Marcos	Golf	Hope Shue†	Middlebury	Lacrosse	Cristelle Rodriguez	Doane	Wrestling	Emily Crosby	Johnson County	Soccer	
2025–26	Maggie Boyd	UCLA	Beach volleyball	Katie Lange	Grand Valley State	Wrestling	Caroline Adams	Middlebury	Lacrosse	Koral Hadac	Cumberlands	Lacrosse	(Germany) Emma Jensen	Northwest Mississippi CC	Soccer	
