= Mihai Brestyan =

Romanian artistic gymnastics coach

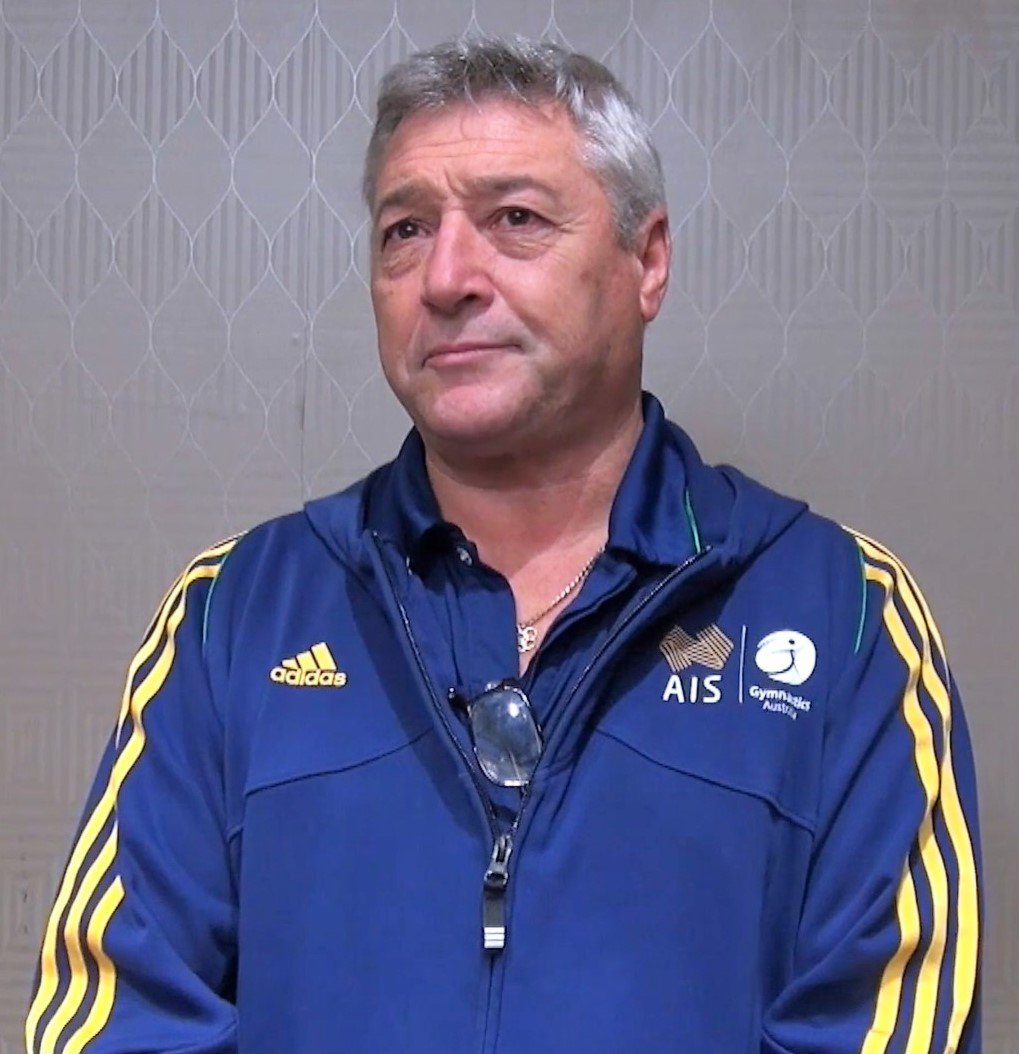
Brestyan for Australian Gymnastics in 2017

Mihai Brestyan (born Mihai Breștian; 10 July 1953 in Timișoara) is a Romanian artistic gymnastics coach, the former head coach of the Australian national gymnastics team and former USA Gymnastics national team coach. He has coached multiple athletes to elite successes, including Olympic champion and six-time Olympic medalist Aly Raisman and world champion and Olympic silver medalist Alicia Sacramone. He has coached at multiple world championships as well as the 2008, 2012, and 2016 Olympic Games. In 2017, he was inducted into the USA Gymnastics Hall of Fame. Independently, Brestyan owns and runs Brestyan's American Gymnastics Club in Burlington, MA.
