= Aly Raisman =

American Olympic gymnast and gold medalist (born 1994)

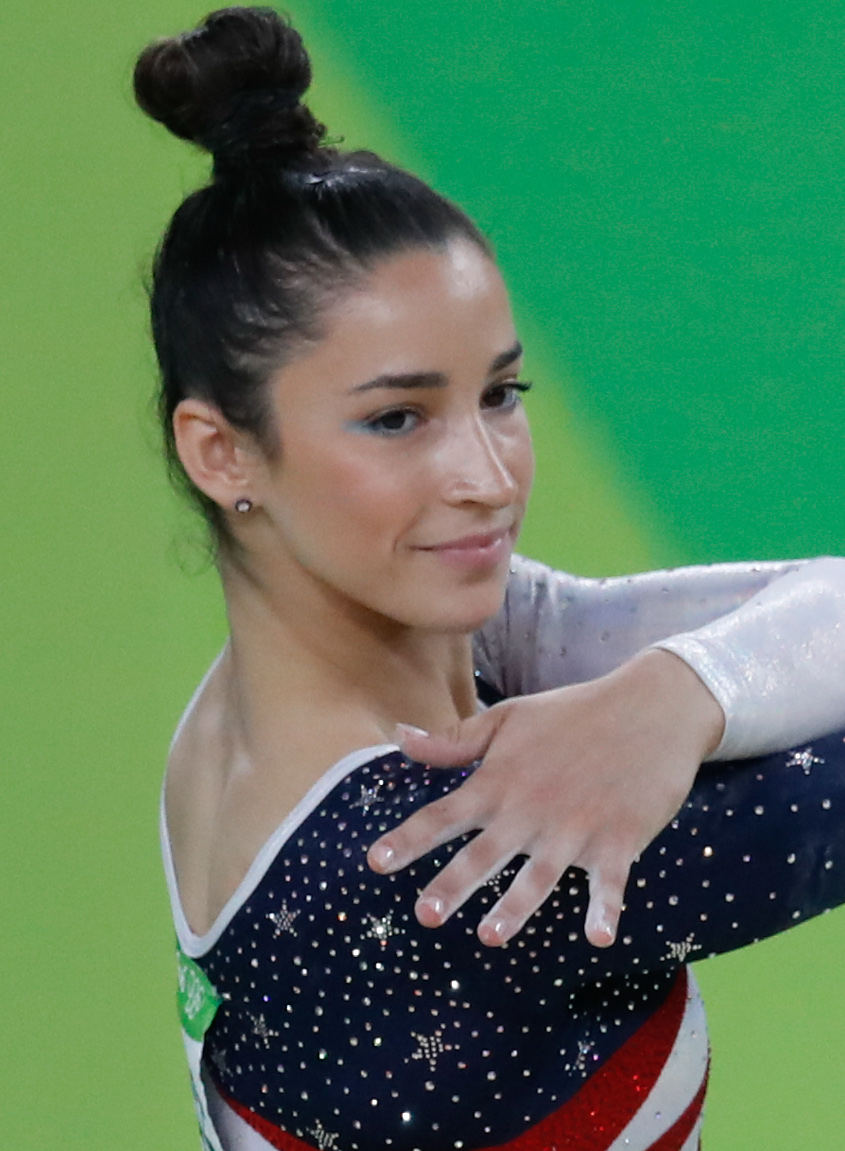
- Raisman at the 2016 Summer Olympics

Personal information
- Full name: Alexandra Rose Raisman
- Nickname: Aly
- Born: May 25, 1994 (age 32) Needham, Massachusetts, U.S.
- Height: 5 ft 2 in (157 cm)

Gymnastics career
- Discipline: Women's artistic gymnastics
- Country represented: United States; (2009–2012, 2014–2016)
- Club: Brestyan's American Gymnastics
- Head coach: Mihai Brestyan
- Assistant coach: Sylvia Brestyan
- Choreographer: Sylvia Brestyan
- Retired: January 14, 2020
- Awards: Arthur Ashe Courage Award (2018)
Medal record
Women's gymnastics
Representing the United States
Olympic Games
Gold medal – first place	2012 London	Team
Gold medal – first place	2012 London	Floor exercise
Gold medal – first place	2016 Rio de Janeiro	Team
Silver medal – second place	2016 Rio de Janeiro	All-around
Silver medal – second place	2016 Rio de Janeiro	Floor exercise
Bronze medal – third place	2012 London	Balance beam
World Championships
Gold medal – first place	2011 Tokyo	Team
Gold medal – first place	2015 Glasgow	Team
Silver medal – second place	2010 Rotterdam	Team
Bronze medal – third place	2011 Tokyo	Floor exercise
Pacific Rim Championships
Gold medal – first place	2010 Melbourne	Team
Gold medal – first place	2016 Everett	Team
Gold medal – first place	2016 Everett	Floor exercise
Silver medal – second place	2010 Melbourne	All-around
Silver medal – second place	2010 Melbourne	Balance beam
Silver medal – second place	2010 Melbourne	Floor exercise
Silver medal – second place	2016 Everett	All-around
Silver medal – second place	2016 Everett	Balance beam
FIG World Cup Series
Event / 1st / 2nd / 3rd; All-Around World Cup / 0 / 2 / 1

Alexandra Rose Raisman (born May 25, 1994) is an American former artistic gymnast and two-time Olympian. She was captain of both the 2012 "Fierce Five" and 2016 "Final Five" U.S. women's Olympic gymnastics teams, which won their respective team competitions.

At the 2012 Olympics in London, she won gold medals in the team and floor competitions, as well as the bronze medal on the balance beam, making her the most decorated American gymnast at the Games. At the 2016 Olympics in Rio de Janeiro, she won a gold medal in the team event, making her and teammate Gabby Douglas the only Americans with back-to-back team gold medals. Raisman also won silver medals in the individual all-around and on the floor exercise. She is the third-most decorated American gymnast in Olympic history behind Shannon Miller and Simone Biles, with six Olympic medals.

Raisman was also a member of the gold-winning American teams at the 2011 and 2015 World Championships, and the World bronze medalist on floor exercise in 2011. She is also a two-time national champion on floor exercise (2012, 2015), the 2012 national champion on balance beam, and a five-time medalist in the all-around at the national championships (silver in 2016, bronze in 2010, 2011, 2012, and 2015).

== Early life and training ==
Raisman was born on May 25, 1994, in the Boston suburb of Needham, Massachusetts, to Lynn, a former high school gymnast, and Rick Raisman. She has three younger siblings: Brett, Chloe, and Madison. Raisman is Jewish with roots in Romania. In 2016, she said, "I take a lot of pride in being able to not only represent the U.S.A, but also the Jewish community everywhere."

Raisman began gymnastics when she was eighteen months old. She attributes her initial love for the sport to the "Magnificent Seven", the gold medal-winning U.S. women's team at the 1996 Summer Olympics, whose performances she watched on VHS. She trained at Exxcel Gymnastics and Climbing until age ten, when she moved to Brestyan's American Gymnastics Club under coaches Mihai and Silvia Brestyan. Raisman graduated from Needham High School in 2012, after completing her senior year via online classes while training for the Olympics.

== Junior career ==
=== 2009 ===
Raisman began competing as an elite gymnast in 2009. She competed at the American Classic in San Diego, where she placed tenth in the all-around. Then in July, she competed at the U.S. Classic in Des Moines, Iowa, and placed twelfth in the all-around. At the National Championships in Dallas, she won the bronze medal in the all-around. She made her international debut at the Pan American Championships in Aracaju, Brazil. She helped the American team win the gold medal, and she placed third in the all-around. In the event finals, she won gold medals on the vault and floor exercise.

== Senior career ==
=== 2010 ===
Raisman made her senior debut at the American Cup in Worcester, Massachusetts. She placed second behind Rebecca Bross with an all-around score of 58.900. Later that month, she competed at the City of Jesolo Trophy in Jesolo, Italy, and won the all-around gold medal. At the Pacific Rim Championships in Melbourne, she helped the American team win the gold medal and placed second in the all-around competition. In the event finals, she placed seventh on uneven bars, second on balance beam, and second on floor exercise. In July, Raisman placed fifth at the U.S. Classic in Chicago. She then competed at the National Championships in Hartford, Connecticut, and placed third in the all-around. She also placed third on the balance beam and on the floor exercise.

In October, Raisman competed at the 2010 World Artistic Gymnastics Championships in Rotterdam. In the team finals, she competed on the vault, balance beam, and floor exercise, and helped the American team win the silver medal by only 0.201 points behind Russia. She then placed thirteenth in the all-around final after struggling on the uneven bars. She finished fourth in the floor exercise final, missing out on a medal by 0.050 points.

=== 2011 ===
In March, Raisman placed third at the American Cup in Jacksonville, Florida, behind Jordyn Wieber and Aliya Mustafina. Later that month, she placed third in the all-around at the City of Jesolo Trophy and helped the American team win the gold medal. She also won bronze on the vault and gold on the balance beam and floor exercise. In July, she won the all-around at the U.S. Classic in Chicago and debuted her Amanar vault. She then competed at the National Championships in Saint Paul, Minnesota, and placed third in the all-around. She also won the bronze medal on the floor exercise.

Raisman was selected to compete at the World Championships in Tokyo. She became team captain after Alicia Sacramone was injured before the competition. She led the American team to the gold medal by over four points ahead of Russia. Individually, she placed fourth in the all-around after falling off the uneven bars. In the event finals, she placed fourth on the balance beam and won the bronze medal on the floor exercise.

In November, Raisman became a professional athlete, giving up her NCAA eligibility and a scholarship to the University of Florida by signing with the Octagon sports management firm.

=== 2012 ===
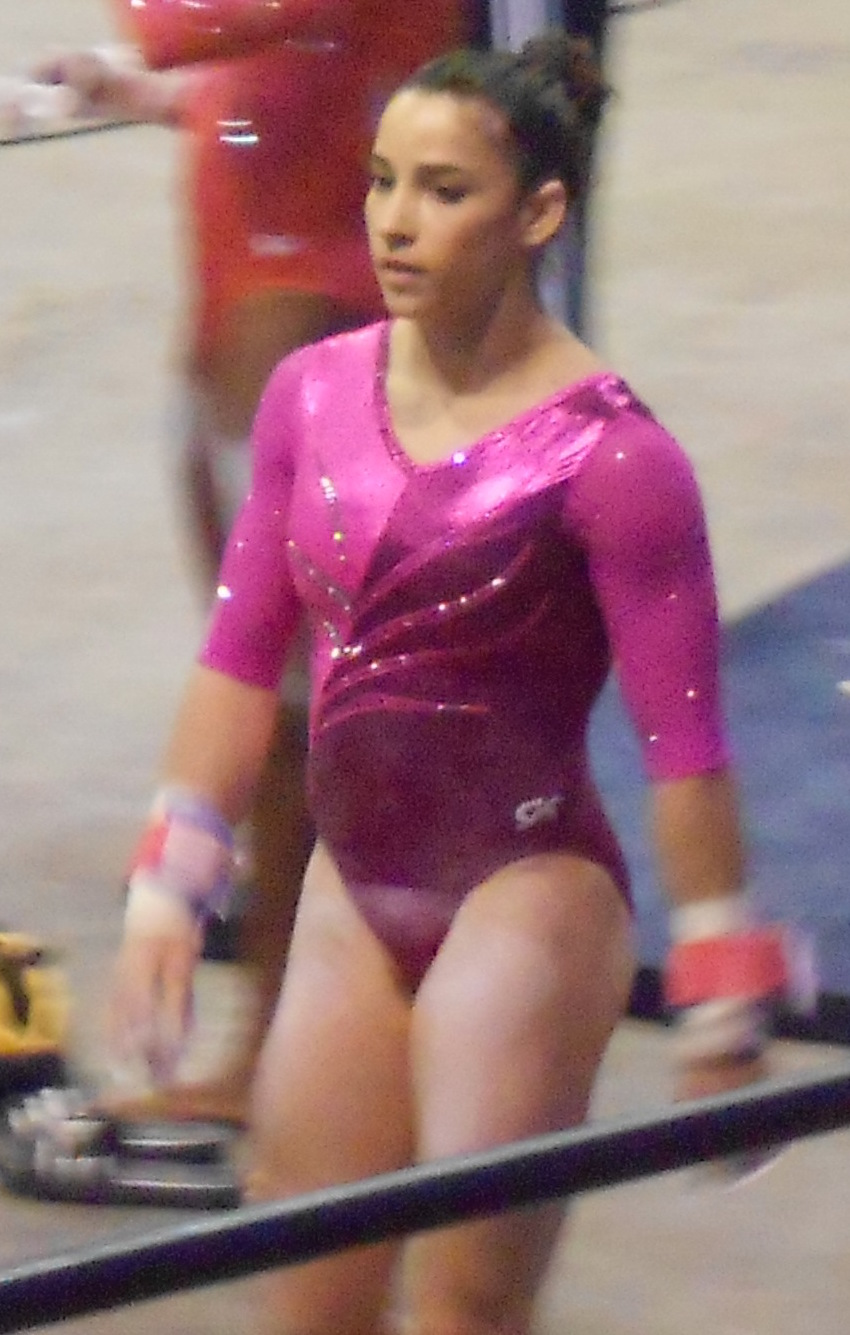
Raisman at the 2012 U.S. Classic

At the beginning of March, Raisman competed at the American Cup in New York City, placing second behind Jordyn Wieber. Then at the end of March, she competed at the City of Jesolo Trophy, where she finished second in the all-around and helped the American team win the gold medal. She then won the all-around title at the U.S. Classic in Chicago. In June, Raisman competed at the National Championships in St. Louis. She placed third in the all-around and finished first on balance beam and on floor exercise. At the beginning of July, Raisman placed third all-around at the Olympic Trials in San Jose, California. She also placed first on both the balance beam and floor exercise. Afterward, she was chosen as a member of the team that would be sent to the 2012 Summer Olympics alongside Gabby Douglas, McKayla Maroney, Kyla Ross, and Jordyn Wieber. Raisman was the oldest at 18 and was named captain of the team.

==== London Olympics ====
At the end of July, Raisman competed at the Olympics in London. She helped the American team (nicknamed the "Fierce Five") qualify in first place to the team final. Individually, she qualified in second place to the individual all-around final, fifth to the balance beam final, and first to the floor exercise final. In the team final, she contributed scores of 14.933 on the balance beam and 15.300 on the floor exercise toward the American team's first-place finish.

In the individual all-around, she finished with a total of 59.566, tying with Aliya Mustafina of Russia for third place. However, she lost the bronze in a tie-breaker and placed fourth. (The tie-breaker counted the three highest apparatus scores; Mustafina's totaled 45.933 and Raisman's totaled 45.366.)

In the balance beam final, Raisman won the bronze medal. She initially scored 14.966, but after Márta Károlyi requested a video review, the judges re-evaluated and granted Raisman's routine an extra tenth in difficulty. As a result, she scored 15.066, matching Romania's Cătălina Ponor for third place, and won the tie-breaker, which prioritized execution score over difficulty score. In the floor exercise final, Raisman placed first with a score of 15.600, becoming the first American woman to win a gold medal on the floor exercise. She performed to the tune of "Hava Nagila".

==== Post-Olympics ====
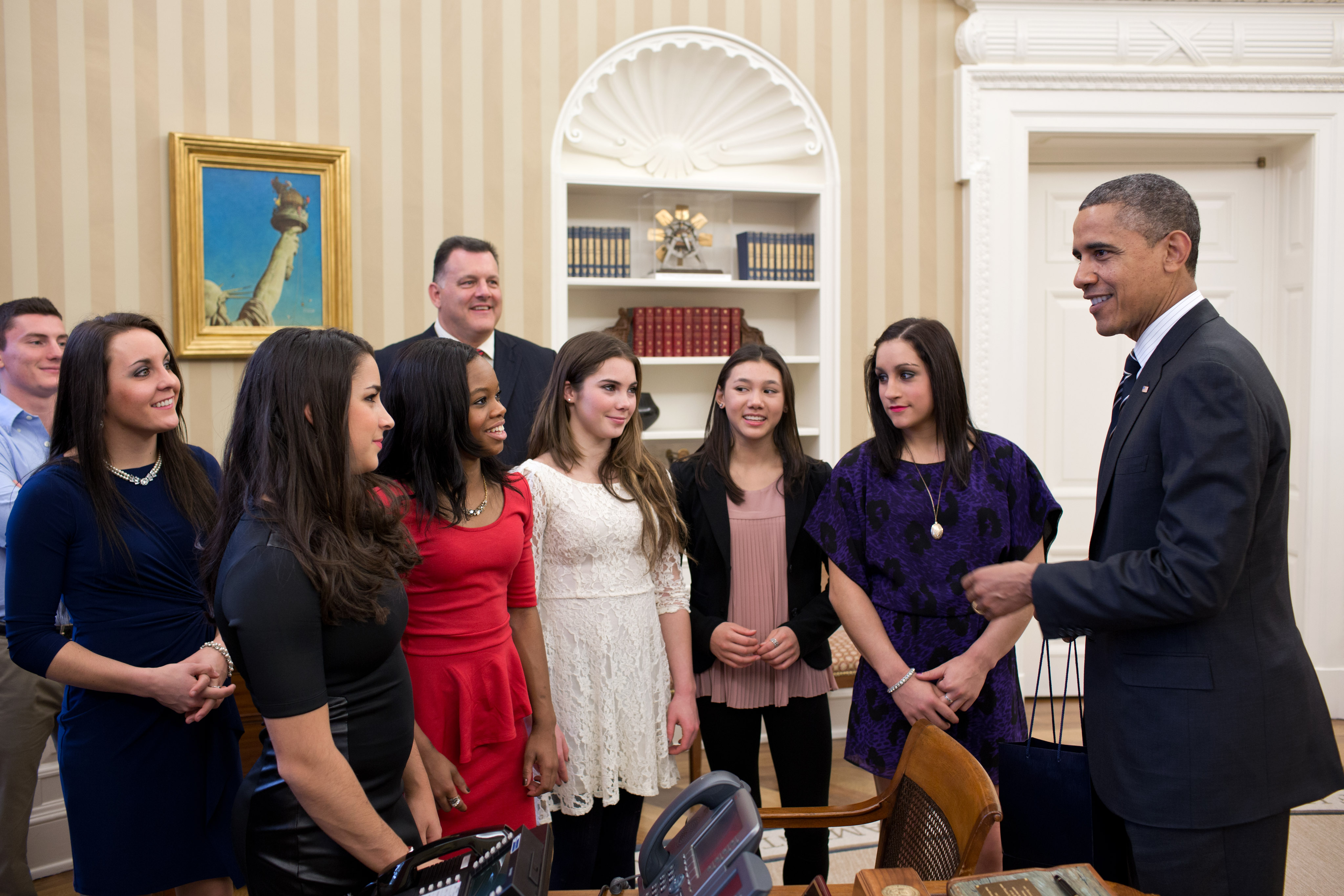
Raisman meeting President Barack Obama with other members of the Fierce Five

In September 2012, Raisman was injured during the Kellogg's Tour of Gymnastics Champions in Ontario, California. She fell while performing a Maloney on the uneven bars and landed off the mats, bruising her knees. This occurred shortly after teammate McKayla Maroney injured herself performing a flyaway dismount on the same bars.

Raisman was given the honor of igniting the 2013 Maccabiah Games flame in Jerusalem. In 2013, she was inducted into the International Jewish Sports Hall of Fame. She attended Babson College in Wellesley, Massachusetts in 2013 before returning to her professional career.

In 2014, Raisman returned to gymnastics at the October national training camp, her first since the Olympics. Longtime coach Mihai Brestyan had Raisman do a year of conditioning before allowing her to return to any apparatus. After the November training camp, she was named again to the U.S. National Team, along with Olympic teammate Gabby Douglas.

=== 2015 ===
Raisman made her comeback to competition at the City of Jesolo Trophy in late March. There, she received the gold medal with the U.S. team and won individual bronze medals in the all-around (behind Simone Biles and Bailie Key) and the floor exercise (behind Biles and Erika Fasana of Italy). Then in July, she competed at the U.S. Classic. She finished fifth in the all-around after falling on a new tumbling pass on the floor exercise. At the National Championships in Indianapolis, she finished third in the all-around, behind Biles and Maggie Nichols.

Raisman was selected to compete at the World Championships in Glasgow alongside Simone Biles, Gabby Douglas, Brenna Dowell, Madison Kocian, Maggie Nichols, and MyKayla Skinner. During the qualification round, she helped the American team qualify for the team final in first place. However, Raisman fell off the uneven bars and finished fifth in the all-around behind both Biles and Douglas, missing the final due to the two-per-country rule. In the team final, the American team won the gold medal by over five points ahead of China.

=== 2016 ===
Raisman started the year at the City of Jesolo Trophy in March and finished sixth in the all-around. She finished first on the floor exercise, beating teammate Ragan Smith by half a point. She also finished third on the balance beam, behind Smith and Laurie Hernandez. At the Pacific Rim Championships, Raisman won gold with the U.S. team and the silver medal in the all-around, behind teammate Simone Biles. She won a second silver medal on the balance beam, behind Smith, and gold on the floor exercise. She then won the U.S. Classic in Hartford by nearly one point ahead of Rachel Gowey despite a fall off the uneven bars.

In June, Raisman competed at the National Championships. She scored 60.450 on the first night and 60.650 on the second, finishing in second place behind Biles. She also placed second on the balance beam and floor exercise behind Biles. At the Olympic Trials in July, she scored a total of 119.750 over two nights, putting her in third place behind Biles and Hernandez. After the Trials, she was named to the 2016 U.S. Olympic women's gymnastics team alongside Biles, Douglas, Hernandez, and Madison Kocian. Raisman and Douglas were the first U.S. women since 2000 to make back-to-back Olympic gymnastics teams. Raisman was again the oldest and named captain of the team.

==== Rio de Janeiro Olympics ====
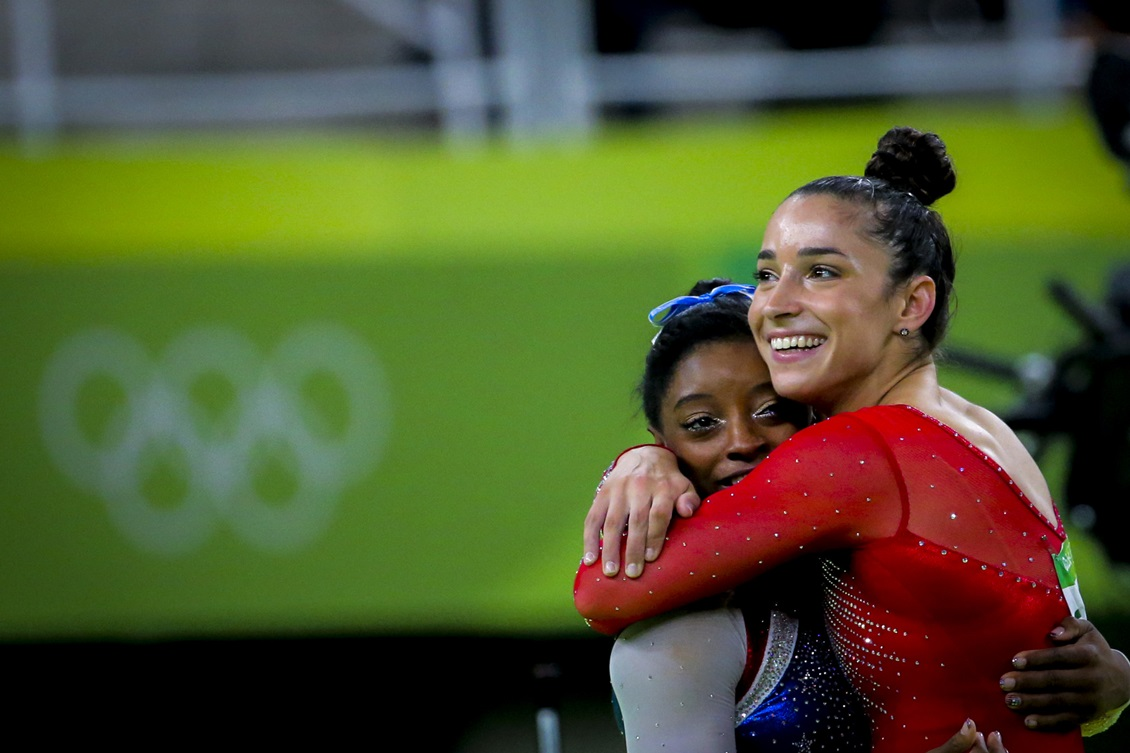
Raisman and Biles hugging after the all-around competition

During the first night of the women's gymnastics competition at the 2016 Summer Olympics, Raisman and the rest of the U.S. team qualified into the team final in first place with a score of 185.238, almost 10 points ahead of the second-place qualifying team. Individually, Raisman qualified second to the all-around final (with a score of 60.607, behind teammate Biles), just edging out defending Olympic all-around winner Douglas who placed third behind Raisman but was bumped due to the two-per-country rule. Raisman also qualified for the floor exercise final in second place behind Biles. On the second day of competition in the team final, Raisman competed on vault, balance beam, and floor exercise to help secure the gold medal for the U.S. team and defend the title she earned with the Fierce Five in 2012. At the end of the competition, she and her teammates dubbed themselves "The Final Five", because they were the last Olympic team Marta Karolyi would name before she retired as team coordinator.

In the all-around final, she placed second with a total score of 60.098, earning a silver medal, behind Biles and ahead of Russia's Aliya Mustafina. Then in the floor exercise final, Raisman again finished second behind Biles, with a score of 15.500, bringing her to a total of six Olympic medals. This made her the second most decorated American Olympic gymnast at the time, behind Shannon Miller.

The 2016 Olympic Games were Raisman's final competition, and she officially announced her retirement on January 14, 2020.

== Sexual abuse and activism ==
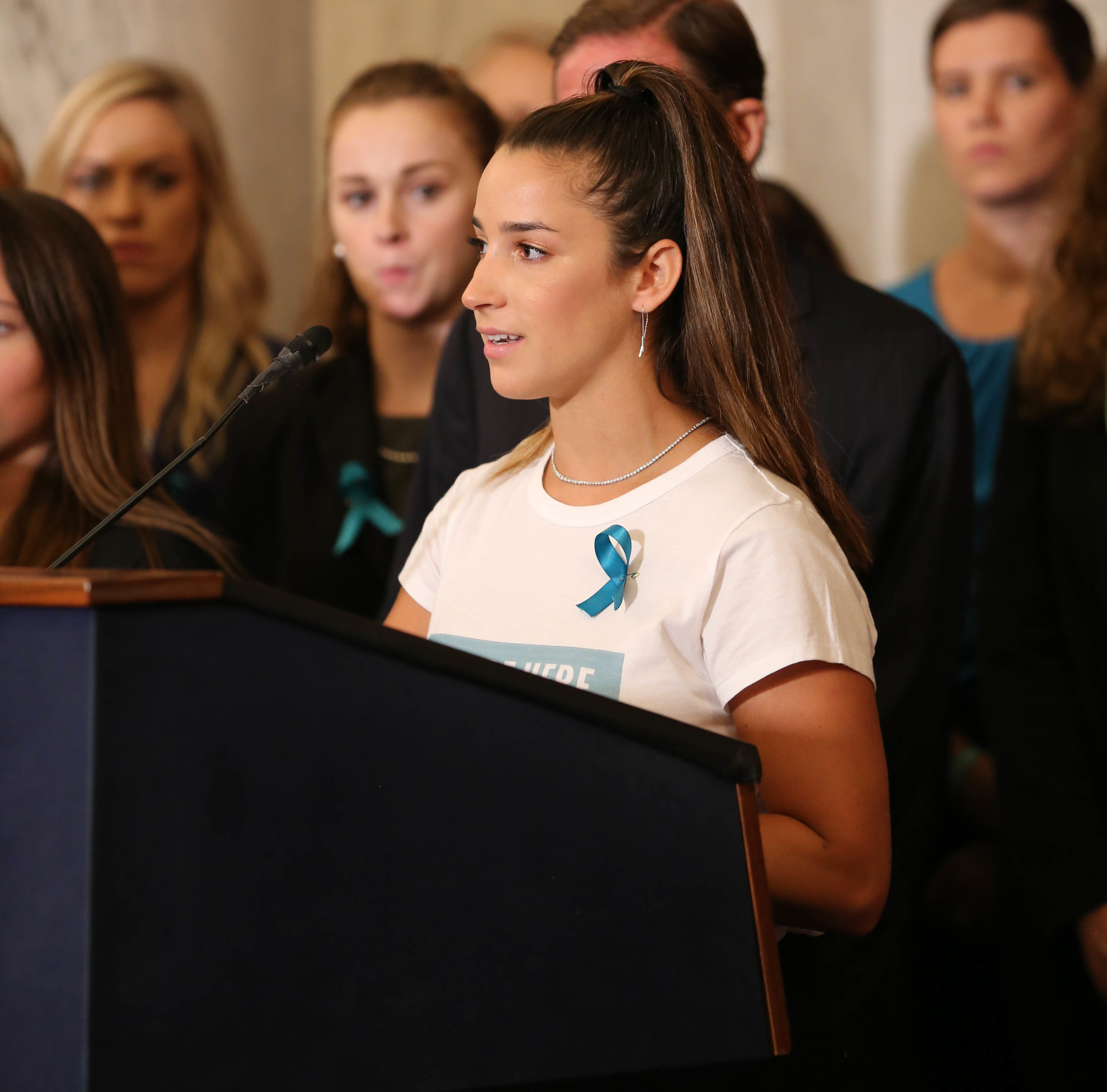
Raisman speaks at a June 2018 event at the United States Capitol featuring her and fellow USA Gymnastics sex abuse survivors

In November 2017, Raisman came forward as one of the many victims sexually abused by the former Olympic team physician, Larry Nassar, starting from the age of 15. On January 19, 2018, she was one of several victims that read impact statements at Nassar's sentencing. On February 28, 2018, she filed a lawsuit against USA Gymnastics and the USOC, claiming both organizations "knew or should have known" about the ongoing abuse. On May 16, 2018, it was announced that Raisman and the other survivors of the USA Gymnastics sexual abuse scandal would be awarded the Arthur Ashe Courage Award. She appeared in the Maroon 5 music video "Girls Like You" featuring Cardi B, wearing a T-shirt with the words "Always Speak Your Truth". On September 24, 2021, Aly Raisman: Darkness to Light, a documentary on her healing from the sexual abuse, aired on Lifetime.

== Dancing with the Stars ==
Raisman was a contestant on season 16 of Dancing With the Stars and finished in fourth place with two-time champion Mark Ballas.

She also made an appearance with the rest of the Fierce Five during the previous season of DWTS, when she appeared during a freestyle dance with 2008 Olympic gold medal winner Shawn Johnson and Johnson's partner that season, Derek Hough.

=== Performances ===
Week #	Dance / song	Judges' score			Result	Ref.
Week #	Dance / song	Inaba	Goodman	Tonioli	Result	Ref.
1	Cha-cha-cha / "Live While We're Young"	7	7	7	No elimination	
2	Quickstep / "Jumpin Jack"	8	8	8	Safe	
3	Prom group dance / "The Rockafeller Skank"; Viennese Waltz / "Give Me Love"	No; 7	scores 8	given 8	Safe	
4	Contemporary / "Titanium"	9	9	9	Safe	
5	Samba / "Misery"	8	8	9	Safe	
6	Foxtrot / "Isn't She Lovely"; Team samba/ "Superstition"	9; 8	9; 9	9; 8	Safe	
7	Salsa / "Echa Pa'lla (Manos Pa'rriba)"; Cha-cha-cha dance-off / "Brokenhearted"	10; Awarded	9; 3	10 points	Safe	
8 Quarter-finals	Argentine Tango / "Reflejo de Luna"; Jive (trio challenge) / "Hit the Road Jack"	9; 9	10; 9	10; 9	Safe	
9 Semi-finals	Rumba / "When I Was Your Man"; Afro Jazz / "Azumba"	10; 10	10; 9	10; 10	Safe	
10; Finals	Samba / "Hips Don't Lie"; Cha-cha-cha relay / "Treasure"; Freestyle / "Icarus"	9 Awarded; 10	9; 3; 10	10 points 10	Eliminated	

== Other media appearances ==
In July 2012, Raisman was the focus of a documentary on Comcast SportsNet titled: Aly Raisman: Quest for Gold. She was filmed for nine months, from the 2011 World Championships until the 2012 Olympic Trials.

Along with the rest of the U.S. women's Olympic gymnastics team, she was featured on the cover of the July 18, 2012, issue of Sports Illustrated. This was the first time an entire Olympic gymnastics team had been featured on the magazine's cover.

Raisman posed nude in the 2015 ESPN The Magazine's Body Issue. She appeared in the issue because she wanted to promote a positive body image:

Sometimes, when you look through magazines or you see these beautiful models, it's hard because you want to compare yourself to them. Although they're stunningly beautiful, I'm not someone who's six feet tall and super, super skinny, I'm not a size zero, so I could never look like that. I'm 5'2", and I'm really strong and muscular so it's completely different. It's great to look at this issue because athletes' bodies are so different, but they're all so amazing in their own way.

Raisman and fellow Olympic teammate Simone Biles appeared in the 2017 Sports Illustrated Swimsuit Issue. She also participated in the 2018 edition to show empowerment for women following the Nassar abuse scandal.

In November 2017, Raisman released her memoir book: Fierce: How Competing for Myself Changed Everything.

She had a cameo in the 2019 Charlie's Angels reboot film.

== Sponsors and endorsements ==
Raisman's first major endorsement deal was with Poland Spring water in 2012. She also signed an endorsement deal with Pandora jewelry in 2012. In 2016, she joined UNICEF Kid Power as a brand ambassador Kid Power Champion. In 2017, she partnered with Playtex for a sports tampon campaign. She began working with Aerie in 2017 and released an activewear collection in 2021.

== Competitive history ==
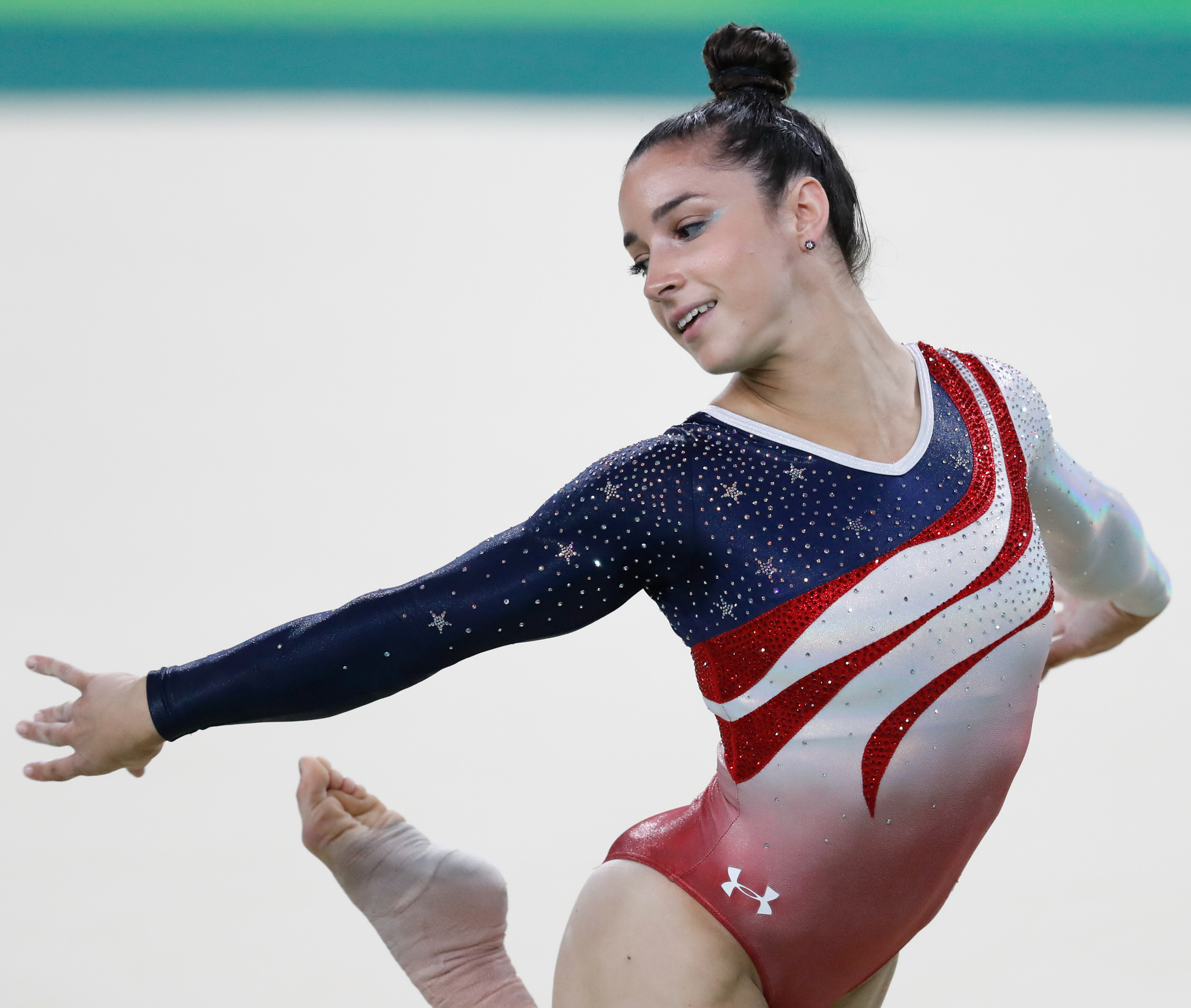
Raisman competing on floor exercise at the 2016 Summer Olympics

Competitive history of Aly Raisman at the junior level
Year	Event	Team	AA	VT	UB	BB	FX
2009	American Classic		10	1st place, gold medalist(s)		4	6
2009	U.S. Classic		12			8	3rd place, bronze medalist(s)
2009	U.S. Championships		3rd place, bronze medalist(s)	5		2nd place, silver medalist(s)	
2009	Pan American Championships	1st place, gold medalist(s)	3rd place, bronze medalist(s)	1st place, gold medalist(s)			1st place, gold medalist(s)

Competitive history of Aly Raisman at the senior level
Year	Event	Team	AA	VT	UB	BB	FX
2010	American Cup		2nd place, silver medalist(s)				
2010	City of Jesolo Trophy	1st place, gold medalist(s)	1st place, gold medalist(s)				
2010	Pacific Rim Championships	1st place, gold medalist(s)	2nd place, silver medalist(s)		7	2nd place, silver medalist(s)	2nd place, silver medalist(s)
2010	U.S. Classic		5		10	5	5
2010	U.S. Championships		3rd place, bronze medalist(s)		11	3rd place, bronze medalist(s)	3rd place, bronze medalist(s)
2010	World Championships	2nd place, silver medalist(s)	13				4
2011	American Cup		3rd place, bronze medalist(s)				
2011	City of Jesolo Trophy	1st place, gold medalist(s)	3rd place, bronze medalist(s)	3rd place, bronze medalist(s)		1st place, gold medalist(s)	1st place, gold medalist(s)
2011	U.S. Classic		1st place, gold medalist(s)	1st place, gold medalist(s)	18	3rd place, bronze medalist(s)	1st place, gold medalist(s)
2011	U.S. Championships		3rd place, bronze medalist(s)		11	6	3rd place, bronze medalist(s)
2011	World Championships	1st place, gold medalist(s)	4			4	3rd place, bronze medalist(s)
2012	American Cup		2nd place, silver medalist(s)				
2012	City of Jesolo Trophy	1st place, gold medalist(s)	2nd place, silver medalist(s)	4	3rd place, bronze medalist(s)	6	2nd place, silver medalist(s)
2012	U.S. Classic		1st place, gold medalist(s)	2nd place, silver medalist(s)	6	1st place, gold medalist(s)	1st place, gold medalist(s)
2012	U.S. Championships		3rd place, bronze medalist(s)		11	1st place, gold medalist(s)	1st place, gold medalist(s)
2012	U.S. Olympic Trials		3rd place, bronze medalist(s)		8	1st place, gold medalist(s)	1st place, gold medalist(s)
2012	Olympic Games	1st place, gold medalist(s)	4			3rd place, bronze medalist(s)	1st place, gold medalist(s)
2013	Did not compete						
2014	Did not compete						
2015	City of Jesolo Trophy	1st place, gold medalist(s)	3rd place, bronze medalist(s)				3rd place, bronze medalist(s)
2015	U.S. Classic		5		9	2nd place, silver medalist(s)	5
2015	U.S. Championships		3rd place, bronze medalist(s)		11	7	1st place, gold medalist(s)
2015	World Championships	1st place, gold medalist(s)					
2016	City of Jesolo Trophy	1st place, gold medalist(s)	6			3rd place, bronze medalist(s)	1st place, gold medalist(s)
2016	Pacific Rim Championships	1st place, gold medalist(s)	2nd place, silver medalist(s)			2nd place, silver medalist(s)	1st place, gold medalist(s)
2016	U.S. Classic		1st place, gold medalist(s)	1st place, gold medalist(s)	19	3rd place, bronze medalist(s)	1st place, gold medalist(s)
2016	U.S. Championships		2nd place, silver medalist(s)		12	2nd place, silver medalist(s)	2nd place, silver medalist(s)
2016	U.S. Olympic Trials		3rd place, bronze medalist(s)	3rd place, bronze medalist(s)	11	3rd place, bronze medalist(s)	2nd place, silver medalist(s)
2016	Olympic Games	1st place, gold medalist(s)	2nd place, silver medalist(s)				2nd place, silver medalist(s)

== Floor music ==
Year	Music Title
2011–2012	Hava Nagila
2015–2016	Russian Sailors Dance/Kalinka

== Bibliography ==
- Fierce: How competing for myself changed everything (Little, Brown, 2017) ISBN 978-0316472708

== Filmography ==
=== Film ===
Year	Title	Role	Notes	Ref.
2019	Charlie's Angels	Angel Recruit	Cameo appearance	

=== Television ===
Year	Title	Role	Notes	Ref.
2012	Aly Raisman: Quest for Gold	Herself	Television documentary special	
2013	Dancing with the Stars	Herself	Contestant on (season 16)	
2016	Lip Sync Battle	Herself	Episode: "Live Special"	
2020	Dear...	Herself	Episode: "Aly Raisman"	
2021	Aly Raisman: Darkness to Light	Herself	Television documentary special	
2024	Simone Biles Rising	Herself	Episode: "I Will Not Be Broken"	

=== Music videos ===
Year	Title	Artist(s)	Role	Ref.
2018	"Girls Like You" (Original, Volume 2 and Vertical Video versions)	Maroon 5 featuring Cardi B	Herself (cameo)	

== See also ==
- List of select Jewish gymnasts
- List of Jewish Olympic medalists
- List of Olympic female gymnasts for the United States

Awards and achievements
Preceded by Emmitt Smith & Cheryl Burke	Dancing with the Stars (US) semi-finalist Season 16 (Spring 2013 with Mark Ballas)	Succeeded by Bill Engvall & Emma Slater
