= 2007 Junior Pan American Artistic Gymnastics Championships =

International sports competition

Junior Pan American Artistic Gymnastics Championships
- Location: Guatemala City, Guatemala
- Date: November 19–26, 2007

The 2007 Junior Pan American Artistic Gymnastics Championships was held in Guatemala City, Guatemala, November 19–26, 2007.

== Medal summary ==
Event	Gold	Silver	Bronze
Women
Team	United States; Olivia Courtney; Chelsea Davis; Mattie Larson; Jordyn Wieber	Canada; Peng-Peng Lee; Dominique Pegg; Jessica Savona; Emma Willis	Brazil; Anna Cardoso; Khiuani Dias; Ethiene Franco; Janaina Silva
All Around	Mattie Larson (USA)	Jordyn Wieber (USA)	Chelsea Davis (USA)
Vault	Dominique Pegg (CAN)	Peng-Peng Lee (CAN)	Gretta Scheuch (PER)
Uneven bars	Jordyn Wieber (USA)	Mattie Larson (USA)	Ethiene Franco (BRA)
Balance beam	Jordyn Wieber (USA)	Chelsea Davis (USA)	Emely Monzon (GUA)
Floor exercise	Mattie Larson (USA)	Peng-Peng Lee (CAN)	Jordyn Wieber (USA)
Men
Team	United States; Alexey Bilozerchev; Glen Ishino; Steven Legendre; Danell Leyva	Brazil; Petrix Barbosa; Sergio Eras; Pericles Silva; Arthur Zanetti	Argentina; Alejandro Boasso; Nicolas Cordoba; Mauro Martinez; Francisco Piferrer
All Around	Steven Legendre (USA)	Glen Ishino (USA)	Alexey Bilozerchev (USA)
Floor exercise	Arthur Zanetti (BRA)	Alexey Bilozerchev (USA)	Petrix Barbosa (BRA)
Pommel horse	Fabian Meza (COL)	Alexey Bilozerchev (USA)	Sergio Eras (BRA)
Rings	Arthur Zanetti (BRA)	Glen Ishino (USA)	Sergio Eras (BRA)
Vault	Didier Lugo (COL)	Arthur Zanetti (BRA)	Mauro Martinez (ARG)
Parallel bars	Fabian Meza (COL)	Alexey Bilozerchev (USA)	Didier Lugo (COL) Sergio Eras (BRA)
Horizontal bar	Danell Leyva (USA)	Nicolas Cordoba (ARG)	Pericles Silva (BRA)

== Medal table ==
Rank	Nation	Gold	Silver	Bronze	Total
1	United States (USA)	8	8	3	19
2	Colombia (COL)	3	0	1	4
3	Brazil (BRA)	2	2	7	11
4	Canada (CAN)	1	3	0	4
5	Argentina (ARG)	0	1	2	3
6	Guatemala (GUA)	0	0	1	1
6	Peru (PER)	0	0	1	1
Totals (7 entries)		14	14	15	43
