= Mattie Larson =

American gymnast (born 1992)

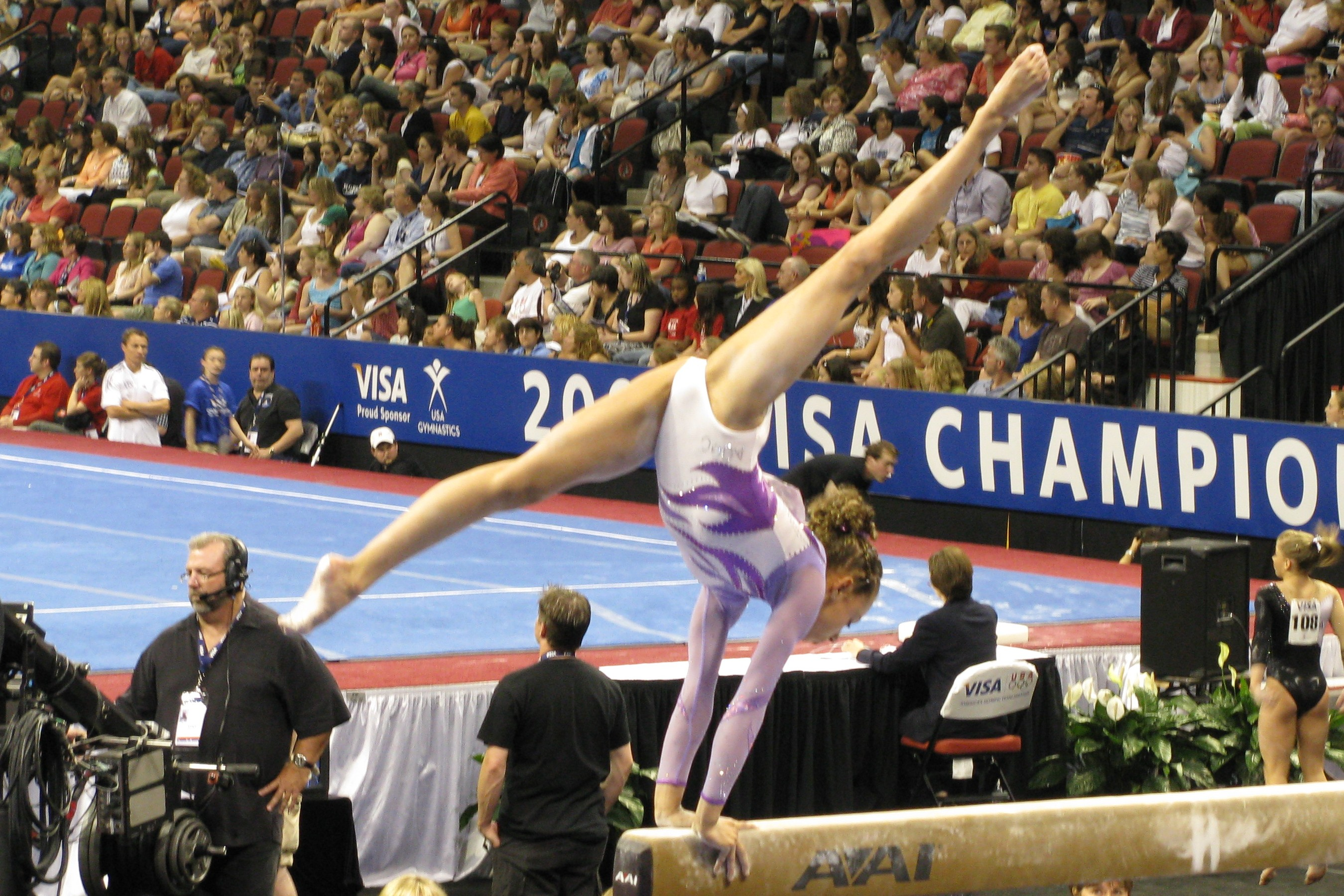
- Larson performing on the balance beam at the 2008 U.S. National Championships

Personal information
- Born: May 20, 1992 (age 34) Los Angeles, California, U.S.
- Height: 5 ft 2 in (157 cm)

Gymnastics career
- Discipline: Women's artistic gymnastics
- Country represented: United States (2007–2011)
- College team: UCLA Bruins
- Club: All Olympia Gymnastics Center
- Former coaches: Galina Marinova, Artur Akopyan, Valorie Kondos Field
- Retired: January 10, 2014
Medal record
Women's gymnastics
Representing the United States
World Championships
Silver medal – second place	2010 Rotterdam	Team
Pan American Championships (junior)
Gold medal – first place	2007 Guatemala City	Team
Gold medal – first place	2007 Guatemala City	All-Around
Gold medal – first place	2007 Guatemala City	Floor Exercise
Silver medal – second place	2007 Guatemala City	Uneven Bars

Mattie Larson (born May 20, 1992) is an American former artistic gymnast. She competed at the senior elite level from 2008 to 2010. Larson was the 2010 U.S. national champion on floor exercise. At that year's World Championships, she won a silver medal with the U.S. in the team competition. Larson then competed at UCLA from 2012 to 2014.

== Junior career ==
=== 2006 ===
Larson first qualified to junior international elite in July 2006 at the U.S. Classic, where she finished fifth all-around. Larson was supposed to compete at her first U.S. National Championships, but an injury forced her out of the competition.

=== 2007 ===
Larson returned to competition in 2007. She finished second all-around and first on vault at the WOGA Classic. She then finished third all-around at the U.S. Classic, qualifying once again to the National Championships. She performed well enough to make the national team. She then competed at the Junior Pan American Championships, her first international assignment, where she won gold in the all-around and on floor. She was named the November USOC Female Athlete of the Month.

== Senior career ==
=== 2008 ===
Larson started her senior career in 2008. She finished second on beam and first on floor at the WOGA Classic. At the Gymnix International competition, she won the silver in the all-around and bronze on bars. She was also named to the Grand Prix Team in Italy but was unable to compete due to a foot injury. During the Friendship International Exchange, she placed 4th all-around and won silver on floor behind teammate Alicia Sacramone. At her first Senior Nationals, she finished seventh all-around to make the national team and qualified for the Olympic Trials. After the Olympic Trials she made the Olympic training squad. Larson had a leg injury and ultimately did not make the team.

=== 2009 ===
Larson opened her 2009 season at the Gymnix World Cup and earned gold medals on beam and floor. She was selected as part of the European Tour. She did not compete all-around but helped the team win against Germany and France. Larson suffered a double-ankle sprain shortly before the 2009 U.S. National Championships. Thus, she was unable to compete and did not recover in time to secure a bid to the 2009 World Championships.

=== 2010 ===
Larson came back in 2010 to win the all-around title at the CoverGirl Classic in July. A month later, she won three medals at the 2010 U.S. National Championships: gold on floor, silver in the all-around, and bronze on uneven bars. She was subsequently chosen to be a member of the U.S. team for the World Championships in Rotterdam.

== College career ==
In 2009, Larson signed her letter of intent to UCLA. She competed for the UCLA Bruins from 2012 through 2014 before retiring from gymnastics.

== Personal life ==
Larson was born in Los Angeles. Her parents, Eric Larson and Gail Boggs, are actors. Larson was a victim of former USA Gymnastics national team doctor Larry Nassar and gave a victim impact statement against him after his conviction and before his sentencing for the sexual abuse of young female athletes.

== Competitive history ==
Year	Event	Team	AA	VT	UB	BB	FX
Junior
2005	J.O. National Championships		1st place, gold medalist(s)	2nd place, silver medalist(s)	3rd place, bronze medalist(s)	2nd place, silver medalist(s)	2nd place, silver medalist(s)
2006	U.S. Classic		5				
2007	U.S. Classic		3rd place, bronze medalist(s)		2nd place, silver medalist(s)		
2007	U.S. National Championships		6	10	8	12	3rd place, bronze medalist(s)
2007	Pan American Championships	1st place, gold medalist(s)	1st place, gold medalist(s)		2nd place, silver medalist(s)		1st place, gold medalist(s)
Senior
2008	International Gymnix	1st place, gold medalist(s)	2nd place, silver medalist(s)		3rd place, bronze medalist(s)		
2008	Friendship Int'l Exchange		4		6		2nd place, silver medalist(s)
2008	U.S. National Championships		7			8	3rd place, bronze medalist(s)
2008	U.S. Olympic Trials		7	9	9	11	6
2009	International Gymnix					1st place, gold medalist(s)	1st place, gold medalist(s)
2009	USA-France Friendly	1st place, gold medalist(s)					
2009	USA-Germany Friendly	1st place, gold medalist(s)	7				
2010	U.S. Classic		1st place, gold medalist(s)	4	8		2nd place, silver medalist(s)
2010	U.S. National Championships		2nd place, silver medalist(s)		3rd place, bronze medalist(s)	7	1st place, gold medalist(s)
2010	Rotterdam World Championships	2nd place, silver medalist(s)					

== Floor music ==
Year	Music Title
2008	Assassin's Tango
2010	Apasionada
2011–2012	Bust Your Windows
2013	Opera Dance
