= Warren Center, Pennsylvania =

Unincorporated community in Pennsylvania, US

- Unincorporated community
- Location within Pennsylvania
- Coordinates: 41°56′16″N 76°10′51″W
- Country: United States
- State: Pennsylvania
- County: Bradford
- Elevation: 1,319 ft (402 m)
- Time zone: UTC-5 (Eastern (EST))
  - Summer (DST): UTC-4 (EDT)
- ZIP code: 18851
- Area codes: 272 & 570
- GNIS feature ID: 1204901

Warren Center is an unincorporated community in Bradford County, Pennsylvania, United States. The community is 4.5 miles (7.2 km) southwest of Little Meadows. Warren Center has a post office with ZIP code 18851.
