= Chelsea Davis =

American artistic gymnast

- Full name: Chelsea Elizabeth Davis
- Nicknames: 'Bit, Chels
- Born: November 2, 1992 (age 33) Austin, Texas, U.S.
- Height: 5 ft 1 in (1.55 m)

Gymnastics career
- Discipline: Women's artistic gymnastics
- Country represented: United States (2007–11 (USA))
- Club: Texas Dreams
- Gym: Texas Dreams Gymnastics
- Head coaches: Kim Zmeskal Burdette and Chris Burdette
- Choreographer: Kim Zmeskal Burdette
- Music: Thunder by nuttin but stringz
Medal record
Women's gymnastics
Representing the United States
World Championships
Silver medal – second place	2010 Rotterdam	Team
Gymnix International
Gold medal – first place	2008 Montreal	Team
Junior Pan American Championships
Gold medal – first place	2007 Guatemala City	Team
Silver medal – second place	2007 Guatemala City	Balance Beam
Bronze medal – third place	2007 Guatemala City	All-Around

Chelsea Elizabeth Davis (born November 2, 1992) is an American artistic gymnast.

== Personal life ==
Davis is the daughter of Peggy and John Davis. Davis's older brother John coaches gymnastics in Arkansas. Her mother is retired. In addition to a sibling, she has a Chihuahua named Princess Molly. When she is not doing gymnastics, her hobbies include video games, board games and NASCAR. In the gym, Davis trains 36 hours a week. Chelsea started gymnastics when she was 3 years old in her hometown. She now competes for the Georgia Gym Dogs.

== Routines ==
Davis performs the following skills on bars, beam, floor, and vault.

Apparatus	Skills	D Score	Top Score in World Championship/World Cup/Olympic Competition
Vault	Yurchenko 1 1/2	5.3	
Uneven Bars	Jump to high bar Kip cast Tkatchev, Kip cast stalder full to Pak Salto, Kip cast 1/2 pirouette to toe up to high bar, Kip cast blind change to jaeger, Kip cast toe shoot full to bail, stalder up, Kip cast, giant giant full twisting double tuck.	5.9	
Balance Beam	Full turn, round off layout stepout, popa facing sideways, front tuck, side aerial, sissone split jump, switch leap to back pike, side somme, switch side, round off double pike.	5.3	
Floor Exercise	Front layout to punch double full to sissone, double tuck, round off 1 1/2 to front full, switch ring, switch side, tour jete half, double pike.	5.4	

== Floor Music ==
- Current: Thunder by nuttin but stringz

== Competition placing results ==
Year	Competition Description	Location	Apparatus	Rank-Final	Score-Final	Rank-Qualifying	Score-Qualifying
2006	U.S. Classic	Kansas City	Team				
2006	U.S. Classic	Kansas City	All Around				
2006	U.S. Classic	Kansas City	Floor Exercise				
2006	U.S. Classic	Kansas City	Uneven Bars	8			
2006	U.S. Classic	Kansas City	Vault	4			
2006	U.S. Classic	Kansas City	Balance Beam				
2007	Junior Pan American Championships	Guatemala City, Guatemala	Team	1			
2007	Junior Pan American Championships	Guatemala City, Guatemala	All Around	3			
2007	Junior Pan American Championships	Guatemala City, Guatemala	Floor Exercise				
2007	Junior Pan American Championships	Guatemala City, Guatemala	Uneven Bars				
2007	Junior Pan American Championships	Guatemala City, Guatemala	Vault				
2007	Junior Pan American Championships	Guatemala City, Guatemala	Balance Beam	2			
2007	U.S. Classic	Battle Creek, Michigan	Team				
2007	U.S. Classic	Battle Creek, Michigan	All Around				
2007	U.S. Classic	Battle Creek, Michigan	Floor Exercise				
2007	U.S. Classic	Battle Creek, Michigan	Uneven Bars	3			
2007	U.S. Classic	Battle Creek, Michigan	Vault				
2007	U.S. Classic	Battle Creek, Michigan	Balance Beam	8			
2007	Visa Championships	San Jose, California	Team				
2007	Visa Championships	San Jose, California	All Around	4			
2007	Visa Championships	San Jose, California	Floor Exercise	5			
2007	Visa Championships	San Jose, California	Uneven Bars	6			
2007	Visa Championships	San Jose, California	Vault	10			
2007	Visa Championships	San Jose, California	Balance Beam	8			
2008	Italy-Spain-Poland-USA competition	Jesolo, Italy	Team				
2008	Italy-Spain-Poland-USA competition	Jesolo, Italy	All Around	6			
2008	Italy-Spain-Poland-USA competition	Jesolo, Italy	Floor Exercise				
2008	Italy-Spain-Poland-USA competition	Jesolo, Italy	Uneven Bars				
2008	Italy-Spain-Poland-USA competition	Jesolo, Italy	Vault				
2008	Italy-Spain-Poland-USA competition	Jesolo, Italy	Balance Beam				
2008	Gymnix International	Montreal, Quebec, Canada	Team	1			
2008	Gymnix International	Montreal, Quebec, Canada	All Around	1			
2008	Gymnix International	Montreal, Quebec, Canada	Floor Exercise	4			
2008	Gymnix International	Montreal, Quebec, Canada	Uneven Bars	5 (Tie)			
2008	Gymnix International	Montreal, Quebec, Canada	Vault				
2008	Gymnix International	Montreal, Quebec, Canada	Balance Beam	2			
2008	U.S. Olympic Team Trials	Philadelphia, Pennsylvania	Team				
2008	U.S. Olympic Team Trials	Philadelphia, Pennsylvania	All Around	8			
2008	U.S. Olympic Team Trials	Philadelphia, Pennsylvania	Floor Exercise	9 (Tie)			
2008	U.S. Olympic Team Trials	Philadelphia, Pennsylvania	Uneven Bars	7			
2008	U.S. Olympic Team Trials	Philadelphia, Pennsylvania	Vault	11			
2008	U.S. Olympic Team Trials	Philadelphia, Pennsylvania	Balance Beam	9			
2010	CoverGirl Classic	Chicago, Illinois	Team				
2010	CoverGirl Classic	Chicago, Illinois	All Around				
2010	CoverGirl Classic	Chicago, Illinois	Floor Exercise				
2010	CoverGirl Classic	Chicago, Illinois	Uneven Bars	5 (Tie)			
2010	CoverGirl Classic	Chicago, Illinois	Vault				
2010	CoverGirl Classic	Chicago, Illinois	Balance Beam	8			
2010	Visa Championships	Hartford, Connecticut	Team				
2010	Visa Championships	Hartford, Connecticut	All Around	5 (Tie)			
2010	Visa Championships	Hartford, Connecticut	Floor Exercise	6			
2010	Visa Championships	Hartford, Connecticut	Uneven Bars	5			
2010	Visa Championships	Hartford, Connecticut	Vault				
2010	Visa Championships	Hartford, Connecticut	Balance Beam	6			
