= Lauren Beers =

American artistic gymnast (born 1994)

- Full name: Lauren Kellie Beers Stanton
- Born: 1994 (age 31–32) Bradford County, Pennsylvania, U.S.
- Height: 1.65 m (5 ft 5 in)

Gymnastics career
- Discipline: Women's artistic gymnastics
- College team: Alabama Crimson Tide (2013–16)
- Training location: University of Alabama
- Head coach: Dana Duckworth
- Former coach: Sarah Patterson
- Retired: June 30, 2016

Lauren Kellie Beers Stanton (born 1994) is a retired American artistic gymnast. She was a member of the Alabama Crimson Tide gymnastics from the 2013 season until the 2016 season.

== Personal life ==
Beers was diagnosed with Osteochondritis dissecans in 2006, at the age of 12. She saw four doctors, all of whom told her to stop gymnastics until she met a USA Gymnastics doctor who performed four surgeries for them to reduce pain. She was home-schooled until high graduation in 2012. In the fall of 2012, she started attending the University of Alabama, as an exercise science major.

== Career ==
=== 2005-12: Club career ===
Beers trained at Southern Tier Gymnastics Academy in Endwell, New York; under coaches Daile VanPatten and Michael Morse.

She competed at her first J.O. Nationals in 2005, placing 52nd in the Junior A division. She placed fourth at the 2008 J.O. Nationals in the Junior B division. In 2010, Lauren qualified to the inaugural 2010 Nastia Liukin Cup, finishing 36th after competing on bars only. Later, she qualified to the 2010 VISA National Championships and finished 15th in the all-around. In 2011, Beers participated in the American Classic and the USA Gymnastics Open Championships but didn't participate during the elite season. In 2012, Beers was State and Regional Champion and finished second all-around at the 2012 J.O. Nationals in the Senior D division.

=== 2013–16: College career ===
==== 2013 season: Freshman ====
Beers immediately contributed to the Crimson Tide team on both vault and floor exercise, during her Freshman season. She was a first team All-American on vault. She garnered career highs of 9.925 and 9.900 in her freshman season. Academically, she made Southeastern Conference Honor roll and earned President's List honors, maintaining a 4.0 GPA.

==== 2014 season: Sophomore ====
Beers had a great Sophomore season. She made career highs of 9.950 on both events and competed on vault in all fourteen meets during the season. She was a 2014 NCAA Women's Gymnastics Championship floor event finalist, finishing eighth. She was awarded the Elite 89 Award, also.
