= 2024 U.S. National Gymnastics Championships =

- Venue: Dickies Arena
- Location: Fort Worth, Texas, U.S.
- Date: May 30, 2024–June 2, 2024

The 2024 U.S. National Gymnastics Championships, known as the 2024 Xfinity U.S. Gymnastics Championships, was the 60th edition of the U.S. National Gymnastics Championships. The competition was held at Dickies Arena in Fort Worth, Texas from May 30–June 2, 2024.

At the event, Simone Biles won her record ninth all-around women's national title, to break the overall record in U.S. National Gymnastics Championships history, while Brody Malone won his third all-around men's national title.

== Podium training ==
The podium training schedule was as follows (in central time):

- Tuesday, May 28: senior men at 5:00 p.m.
- Wednesday, May 29: junior men at 10:00 a.m.
- Wednesday, May 29: junior & senior women at 3:30 p.m.
- Wednesday, May 29: senior women at 6:00 p.m.

== Competition schedule ==
The competition featured Senior and Junior contests for both women's and men's disciplines. The competition schedule was as follows (in central time):

- Thursday, May 30: Men's gymnastics Day 1 – juniors at 1:30 p.m. and seniors at 7:00 p.m.
- Friday, May 31: Women's gymnastics Day 1 – juniors/seniors session 1 at 1:45 p.m. and seniors session 2 at 6:45 p.m.
- Saturday, June 1: Men's gymnastics Day 2 – juniors at 1:30 p.m. and seniors at 7:00 p.m.
- Sunday, June 2: Women's gymnastics Day 2 – juniors/seniors session 1 at 12:45 p.m. and seniors session 2 at 5:45 p.m.

The event was broadcast on NBC Sports and CNBC and live-streamed on USA Gymnastics' YouTube channel and Peacock.

== Sponsorship ==
Xfinity, the sponsor of the previous year's event, continued their sponsorship in 2024.

== Medalists ==
| Event | Gold | Silver | Bronze |
|---|---|---|---|
Senior Women
| Individual all-around | Simone Biles | Skye Blakely | Kayla DiCello |
| Vault | Simone Biles | Skye Blakely | Jade Carey |
| Uneven bars | Simone Biles | Jordan Chiles | Skye Blakely |
| Balance beam | Simone Biles | Sunisa Lee | Skye Blakely |
| Floor | Simone Biles | Kayla DiCello | Tiana Sumanasekera |
Junior Women
| Individual all-around | Claire Pease | Gabrielle Hardie | Addy Fulcher Camie Westerman |
| Vault | Lavi Crain | Camie Westerman | Gabrielle Hardie |
| Uneven bars | Claire Pease | Gabrielle Hardie | Addy Fulcher |
| Balance beam | Claire Pease | Harlow Buddendeck | Camie Westerman |
| Floor | Harlow Buddendeck | Tyler Turner | Camie Westerman |
Senior Men
| Individual all-around | Brody Malone | Fred Richard | Khoi Young |
| Floor | Fred Richard | Yul Moldauer | Landen Blixt |
| Pommel horse | Stephen Nedoroscik | Patrick Hoopes | Brandon Dang |
| Rings | Alex Diab | Brody Malone | Asher Hong |
| Vault | Donnell Whittenburg | Tate Costa | Not awarded |
| Parallel bars | Yul Moldauer | Khoi Young | Colt Walker |
| Horizontal bar | Brody Malone | Fred Richard | Cameron Bock |
Junior Men (17–18)
| Individual all-around | Dante Reive | Justin Park | Nartey Brady |
Junior Men (15–16)
| Individual all-around | Maksim Kan | Hunter Simpson | Troy Holman |

== Results ==
=== Women ===
==== Senior ====
| Rank | Gymnast | Vault (gymnastics) | Uneven bars | Balance beam | Floor (gymnastics) | Day Total | Total |
|---|---|---|---|---|---|---|---|
| 1st place, gold medalist(s) | Simone Biles | 15.800 | 14.650 | 14.800 | 15.200 | 60.450 | 119.750 |
| 1st place, gold medalist(s) | Simone Biles | 15.000 | 14.400 | 14.800 | 15.100 | 59.300 | 119.750 |
| 2nd place, silver medalist(s) | Skye Blakely | 15.000 | 14.400 | 14.450 | 13.200 | 57.050 | 113.850 |
| 2nd place, silver medalist(s) | Skye Blakely | 14.400 | 14.450 | 14.200 | 13.750 | 56.800 | 113.850 |
| 3rd place, bronze medalist(s) | Kayla DiCello | 14.400 | 14.500 | 14.100 | 13.850 | 56.850 | 110.800 |
| 3rd place, bronze medalist(s) | Kayla DiCello | 14.350 | 12.600 | 13.050 | 13.950 | 53.950 | 110.800 |
| 4 | Sunisa Lee | 14.000 | 14.300 | 14.200 | 13.250 | 55.750 | 110.650 |
| 4 | Sunisa Lee | 12.150 | 14.500 | 14.900 | 13.350 | 54.900 | 110.650 |
| 5 | Jordan Chiles | 14.150 | 14.500 | 13.700 | 12.750 | 55.100 | 110.400 |
| 5 | Jordan Chiles | 14.400 | 14.500 | 12.300 | 14.100 | 55.300 | 110.400 |
| 6 | Hezly Rivera | 14.200 | 14.150 | 13.850 | 13.100 | 55.300 | 110.350 |
| 6 | Hezly Rivera | 13.950 | 13.800 | 14.100 | 13.200 | 55.050 | 110.350 |
| 7 | Jade Carey | 14.500 | 13.500 | 13.450 | 13.600 | 55.050 | 109.300 |
| 7 | Jade Carey | 14.600 | 13.650 | 12.300 | 13.700 | 54.250 | 109.300 |
| 8 | Leanne Wong | 14.200 | 13.900 | 13.750 | 13.700 | 55.550 | 108.650 |
| 8 | Leanne Wong | 14.250 | 13.550 | 11.700 | 13.600 | 53.100 | 108.650 |
| 9 | Tiana Sumanasekera | 14.250 | 12.750 | 13.700 | 13.700 | 54.400 | 108.550 |
| 9 | Tiana Sumanasekera | 14.150 | 12.650 | 13.550 | 13.800 | 54.150 | 108.550 |
| 10 | Joscelyn Roberson | 14.000 | 13.250 | 12.800 | 13.300 | 53.350 | 108.200 |
| 10 | Joscelyn Roberson | 13.900 | 13.200 | 13.750 | 14.000 | 54.850 | 108.200 |
| 11 | Zoey Molomo | 13.950 | 13.300 | 13.650 | 12.750 | 53.650 | 106.550 |
| 11 | Zoey Molomo | 13.800 | 12.800 | 13.000 | 13.300 | 52.900 | 106.550 |
| 12 | Simone Rose | 13.600 | 13.100 | 13.300 | 13.050 | 53.050 | 106.400 |
| 12 | Simone Rose | 13.550 | 13.650 | 12.750 | 13.400 | 53.350 | 106.400 |
| 13 | Eveylynn Lowe | 13.550 | 12.550 | 13.750 | 13.100 | 52.950 | 106.350 |
| 13 | Eveylynn Lowe | 13.550 | 12.700 | 13.650 | 13.500 | 53.400 | 106.350 |
| 14 | Dulcy Caylor | 14.000 | 13.350 | 12.900 | 13.350 | 53.600 | 106.150 |
| 14 | Dulcy Caylor | 13.900 | 13.200 | 12.750 | 12.700 | 52.550 | 106.150 |
| 15 | Madray Johnson | 13.700 | 13.050 | 14.050 | 13.100 | 53.900 | 105.900 |
| 15 | Madray Johnson | 12.500 | 13.000 | 13.400 | 13.100 | 52.000 | 105.900 |
| 16 | Jayla Hang | 14.200 | 11.800 | 13.450 | 12.850 | 52.300 | 105.250 |
| 16 | Jayla Hang | 14.200 | 13.600 | 12.200 | 12.950 | 52.950 | 105.250 |
| 17 | Marissa Neal | 13.450 | 13.100 | 13.350 | 12.100 | 52.000 | 104.400 |
| 17 | Marissa Neal | 13.600 | 13.250 | 13.450 | 12.100 | 52.400 | 104.400 |
| 18 | Nola Matthews | 12.850 | 13.200 | 12.050 | 13.150 | 51.250 | 103.800 |
| 18 | Nola Matthews | 13.050 | 13.750 | 12.900 | 12.850 | 52.550 | 103.800 |
| 19T | Addison Fatta | 13.600 | 13.250 | 12.600 | 12.650 | 52.100 | 103.700 |
| 19T | Addison Fatta | 13.850 | 12.850 | 12.200 | 12.700 | 51.600 | 103.700 |
| 19T | Kieryn Finnell | 12.900 | 13.250 | 13.750 | 12.500 | 52.400 | 103.700 |
| 19T | Kieryn Finnell | 12.950 | 13.100 | 12.650 | 12.600 | 51.300 | 103.700 |
| 21 | Ashlee Sullivan | 13.300 | 12.600 | 12.800 | 13.000 | 51.700 | 103.450 |
| 21 | Ashlee Sullivan | 13.050 | 12.300 | 13.250 | 13.150 | 51.750 | 103.450 |
| 22 | Chloe Cho | 13.300 | 13.300 | 12.150 | 12.850 | 51.600 | 103.400 |
| 22 | Chloe Cho | 13.100 | 13.350 | 12.750 | 12.600 | 51.800 | 103.400 |
| 23 | Katelyn Jong | 12.750 | 13.800 | 12.250 | 12.550 | 51.350 | 103.200 |
| 23 | Katelyn Jong | 12.900 | 13.900 | 12.450 | 12.600 | 51.850 | 103.200 |
| 24 | Nicole Desmond | 13.400 | 12.250 | 13.300 | 13.050 | 52.000 | 102.750 |
| 24 | Nicole Desmond | 13.550 | 11.250 | 12.800 | 13.150 | 50.750 | 102.750 |
| 25 | Tatum Drusch | 12.750 | 13.150 | 12.250 | 12.800 | 50.950 | 102.450 |
| 25 | Tatum Drusch | 12.950 | 13.150 | 12.600 | 12.800 | 51.500 | 102.450 |
| 26 | Brooke Pierson | 13.450 | 13.100 | 12.300 | 12.300 | 51.150 | 101.150 |
| 26 | Brooke Pierson | 13.550 | 12.200 | 12.300 | 11.950 | 50.000 | 101.150 |
| 27 | Annalisa Milton | 13.200 | 13.300 | 11.250 | 12.700 | 50.450 | 100.900 |
| 27 | Annalisa Milton | 13.350 | 12.100 | 12.250 | 12.750 | 50.450 | 100.900 |
| 28 | Lexi Zeiss | 13.250 | 13.500 | 12.900 | 11.000 | 50.650 | 100.050 |
| 28 | Lexi Zeiss | 13.150 | 13.350 | 11.600 | 11.300 | 49.400 | 100.050 |
| 29 | Reese Esponda | 13.800 | 13.100 | 9.500 | 13.500 | 49.900 | 99.300 |
| 29 | Reese Esponda | 13.650 | 11.050 | 11.050 | 13.650 | 49.400 | 99.300 |
| 30 | Malea Milton | 12.900 | 12.400 | 12.350 | 13.150 | 50.800 | 98.050 |
| 30 | Malea Milton | 12.750 | 12.300 | 10.700 | 11.500 | 47.250 | 98.050 |
| 31 | Kelise Woolford | 13.000 | 10.700 | 12.150 | 12.650 | 48.500 | 97.400 |
| 31 | Kelise Woolford | 13.100 | 10.400 | 12.850 | 12.550 | 48.900 | 97.400 |
| 32 | Norah Christian | 11.550 | 8.950 | 12.450 | 12.000 | 44.950 | 94.200 |
| 32 | Norah Christian | 12.900 | 11.700 | 12.550 | 12.100 | 49.250 | 94.200 |
| 33 | Cambry Haynes | 13.500 | – | 12.500 | 12.200 | 38.200 | 76.850 |
| 33 | Cambry Haynes | 13.000 | – | 12.700 | 12.950 | 38.650 | 76.850 |
| 34 | Ly Bui | 14.100 | 13.400 | – | – | 27.500 | 54.700 |
| 34 | Ly Bui | 13.900 | 13.300 | – | – | 27.200 | 54.700 |
| 35 | Brynn Torry | 13.750 | 12.250 | – | – | 26.000 | 52.150 |
| 35 | Brynn Torry | 13.450 | 12.700 | – | – | 26.150 | 52.150 |
| 36 | CaMarah Williams | 11.800 | 8.100 | – | 12.700 | 32.600 | 32.600 |
| 36 | CaMarah Williams | – | – | – | – | – | 32.600 |
| 37 | Trinity Thomas | – | – | – | 10.900 | 10.900 | 24.450 |
| 37 | Trinity Thomas | – | 13.550 | – | – | 13.550 | 24.450 |
| 38 | Amelia Disidore | – | 12.050 | – | – | 12.050 | 22.250 |
| 38 | Amelia Disidore | – | 10.200 | – | – | 10.200 | 22.250 |

==== Junior ====
| Rank | Gymnast | Vault (gymnastics) | Uneven bars | Balance beam | Floor (gymnastics) | Day Total | Total |
|---|---|---|---|---|---|---|---|
| 1st place, gold medalist(s) | Claire Pease | 12.450 | 13.800 | 14.150 | 12.850 | 53.250 | 107.350 |
| 1st place, gold medalist(s) | Claire Pease | 14.050 | 13.850 | 13.350 | 12.850 | 54.100 | 107.350 |
| 2nd place, silver medalist(s) | Gabrielle Hardie | 12.900 | 13.600 | 12.700 | 13.200 | 52.400 | 102.250 |
| 2nd place, silver medalist(s) | Gabrielle Hardie | 13.150 | 13.650 | 11.300 | 11.750 | 49.850 | 102.250 |
| 3rd place, bronze medalist(s) | Addy Fulcher | 13.000 | 13.300 | 11.450 | 12.600 | 50.350 | 102.050 |
| 3rd place, bronze medalist(s) | Addy Fulcher | 13.000 | 12.950 | 12.650 | 13.100 | 51.700 | 102.050 |
| 3rd place, bronze medalist(s) | Camie Westerman | 12.900 | 12.400 | 12.400 | 12.900 | 50.600 | 102.050 |
| 3rd place, bronze medalist(s) | Camie Westerman | 13.200 | 12.800 | 12.500 | 12.950 | 51.450 | 102.050 |
| 5 | Lavi Crain | 13.950 | 11.250 | 12.200 | 12.850 | 50.250 | 101.300 |
| 5 | Lavi Crain | 14.000 | 12.300 | 12.050 | 12.700 | 51.050 | 101.300 |
| 6 | Tyler Turner | 13.250 | 12.700 | 11.050 | 12.950 | 49.950 | 100.400 |
| 6 | Tyler Turner | 12.100 | 12.600 | 12.800 | 12.950 | 50.450 | 100.400 |
| 7 | Harlow Buddendeck | 12.900 | 12.350 | 12.400 | 13.200 | 50.850 | 100.100 |
| 7 | Harlow Buddendeck | 12.850 | 11.050 | 12.600 | 12.750 | 49.250 | 100.100 |
| 8 | Maliha Tressel | 13.100 | 12.700 | 12.200 | 12.800 | 50.800 | 99.850 |
| 8 | Maliha Tressel | 13.100 | 12.150 | 10.900 | 12.900 | 49.050 | 99.850 |
| 9 | Isabella Anzola | 12.900 | 11.850 | 13.000 | 12.000 | 49.750 | 99.200 |
| 9 | Isabella Anzola | 12.900 | 12.250 | 11.800 | 12.500 | 49.450 | 99.200 |
| 10 | Greta Krob | 12.900 | 12.150 | 12.500 | 12.400 | 49.950 | 99.000 |
| 10 | Greta Krob | 12.800 | 12.350 | 11.950 | 11.950 | 49.050 | 99.000 |
| 11 | Jaysha McClendon | 12.600 | 13.000 | 11.400 | 12.750 | 49.750 | 98.900 |
| 11 | Jaysha McClendon | 12.950 | 13.000 | 11.900 | 11.300 | 49.150 | 98.900 |
| 12 | Ally Damelio | 12.500 | 13.100 | 11.300 | 12.550 | 49.450 | 97.250 |
| 12 | Ally Damelio | 12.700 | 11.950 | 11.100 | 12.050 | 47.800 | 97.250 |
| 13 | Charleigh Bullock | 12.950 | 10.650 | 10.550 | 12.150 | 46.300 | 95.700 |
| 13 | Charleigh Bullock | 12.800 | 12.750 | 12.400 | 11.450 | 49.400 | 95.700 |

=== Men ===
==== Senior ====
| Rank | Gymnast | Floor (gymnastics) | Pommel horse | Rings (gymnastics) | Vault (gymnastics) | Parallel bars | Horizontal bar | Day Total | Total |
|---|---|---|---|---|---|---|---|---|---|
| 1st place, gold medalist(s) | Brody Malone | 14.000 | 14.100 | 14.400 | 14.000 | 14.550 | 14.900 | 85.950 | 172.300 |
| 1st place, gold medalist(s) | Brody Malone | 13.600 | 14.000 | 14.850 | 14.400 | 14.900 | 14.600 | 86.350 | 172.300 |
| 2nd place, silver medalist(s) | Fred Richard | 14.600 | 12.850 | 14.000 | 14.200 | 14.300 | 14.400 | 84.350 | 170.250 |
| 2nd place, silver medalist(s) | Fred Richard | 14.900 | 13.300 | 14.300 | 14.400 | 14.600 | 14.400 | 85.900 | 170.250 |
| 3rd place, bronze medalist(s) | Khoi Young | 14.150 | 12.600 | 13.200 | 14.800 | 14.900 | 13.750 | 83.400 | 169.550 |
| 3rd place, bronze medalist(s) | Khoi Young | 14.250 | 15.000 | 13.600 | 14.850 | 14.900 | 13.550 | 86.150 | 169.550 |
| 4 | Yul Moldauer | 14.600 | 12.550 | 14.000 | 12.650 | 15.400 | 13.250 | 82.450 | 168.200 |
| 4 | Yul Moldauer | 14.700 | 13.700 | 14.100 | 14.550 | 15.400 | 13.300 | 85.750 | 168.200 |
| 5 | Shane Wiskus | 14.450 | 13.600 | 13.050 | 14.300 | 14.500 | 13.500 | 83.400 | 168.200 |
| 5 | Shane Wiskus | 14.150 | 13.700 | 14.200 | 14.300 | 14.950 | 13.500 | 84.800 | 168.200 |
| 6 | Paul Juda | 14.750 | 13.900 | 13.950 | 13.550 | 14.150 | 12.450 | 82.750 | 167.150 |
| 6 | Paul Juda | 13.700 | 14.000 | 13.950 | 14.700 | 14.050 | 14.000 | 84.400 | 167.150 |
| 7 | Donnell Whittenburg | 13.900 | 13.000 | 14.350 | 14.450 | 14.400 | 13.400 | 83.500 | 167.000 |
| 7 | Donnell Whittenburg | 14.300 | 13.150 | 14.600 | 14.600 | 14.500 | 12.350 | 83.500 | 167.000 |
| 8 | Cameron Bock | 13.500 | 14.100 | 13.900 | 13.950 | 13.450 | 13.850 | 82.750 | 166.850 |
| 8 | Cameron Bock | 13.650 | 13.900 | 13.800 | 14.100 | 14.900 | 13.750 | 84.100 | 166.850 |
| 9 | Colt Walker | 13.600 | 13.650 | 13.800 | 14.050 | 14.950 | 13.450 | 83.500 | 166.800 |
| 9 | Colt Walker | 14.100 | 13.850 | 13.800 | 13.800 | 14.850 | 12.900 | 83.300 | 166.800 |
| 10 | Asher Hong | 13.900 | 11.750 | 14.500 | 14.000 | 14.750 | 13.350 | 82.250 | 165.000 |
| 10 | Asher Hong | 13.500 | 12.950 | 14.550 | 14.550 | 14.750 | 12.450 | 82.750 | 165.000 |
| 11 | Fuzzy Benas | 14.000 | 13.750 | 13.200 | 13.950 | 13.650 | 13.050 | 81.600 | 164.500 |
| 11 | Fuzzy Benas | 13.900 | 13.900 | 13.850 | 13.450 | 14.350 | 13.450 | 82.900 | 164.500 |
| 12 | Jeremy Bischoff | 13.900 | 12.800 | 12.850 | 13.900 | 14.200 | 13.750 | 81.400 | 163.900 |
| 12 | Jeremy Bischoff | 14.150 | 13.300 | 13.500 | 13.700 | 14.350 | 13.500 | 82.500 | 163.900 |
| 13 | Riley Loos | 13.550 | 12.500 | 13.900 | 14.050 | 13.350 | 13.300 | 80.650 | 163.350 |
| 13 | Riley Loos | 14.350 | 13.450 | 14.200 | 14.000 | 13.500 | 13.200 | 82.700 | 163.350 |
| 14 | Taylor Burkhart | 13.500 | 13.500 | 13.850 | 12.750 | 14.300 | 12.750 | 80.650 | 162.800 |
| 14 | Taylor Burkhart | 12.550 | 13.200 | 13.800 | 14.500 | 14.150 | 13.950 | 82.150 | 162.800 |
| 15 | Landen Blixt | 14.000 | 12.850 | 13.100 | 11.100 | 14.100 | 12.450 | 77.600 | 159.350 |
| 15 | Landen Blixt | 14.650 | 13.050 | 13.000 | 14.300 | 13.450 | 13.300 | 81.750 | 159.350 |
| 16 | Taylor Christopulos | 13.900 | 12.600 | 13.100 | 14.250 | 13.600 | 12.800 | 80.250 | 159.000 |
| 16 | Taylor Christopulos | 13.650 | 11.650 | 12.900 | 14.050 | 13.200 | 13.300 | 78.750 | 159.000 |
| 17 | Joshua Karnes | 13.000 | 13.150 | 12.850 | 10.750 | 14.600 | 13.600 | 77.950 | 157.450 |
| 17 | Joshua Karnes | 12.950 | 12.550 | 13.600 | 13.650 | 14.450 | 12.300 | 79.500 | 157.450 |
| 18 | Samuel Phillips | 13.500 | 11.500 | 13.300 | 13.800 | 12.350 | 13.500 | 77.950 | 156.950 |
| 18 | Samuel Phillips | 13.250 | 12.500 | 13.500 | 13.800 | 13.500 | 12.450 | 79.000 | 156.950 |
| 19 | Caden Clinton | 13.050 | 11.950 | 13.500 | 12.650 | 13.450 | 13.300 | 77.900 | 156.150 |
| 19 | Caden Clinton | 13.300 | 12.100 | 13.050 | 12.200 | 14.050 | 13.550 | 78.250 | 156.150 |
| 20 | Kiran Mandava | 13.200 | 13.350 | 12.650 | 13.300 | 13.250 | 13.150 | 78.900 | 156.150 |
| 20 | Kiran Mandava | 13.150 | 11.200 | 13.100 | 13.800 | 13.350 | 12.650 | 77.250 | 156.150 |
| 21 | David Ramirez | 12.100 | 11.600 | 11.650 | 13.350 | 13.200 | 11.950 | 73.850 | 152.150 |
| 21 | David Ramirez | 12.550 | 13.050 | 12.850 | 14.150 | 13.450 | 12.250 | 78.300 | 152.150 |
| 22 | Dallas Hale | 12.450 | 13.100 | 11.800 | 14.100 | 14.700 | 11.100 | 77.250 | 150.150 |
| 22 | Dallas Hale | 13.850 | 10.900 | 10.300 | 14.100 | 12.600 | 11.150 | 72.900 | 150.150 |
| 23 | Kai Uemura | 13.050 | 10.050 | 12.800 | 12.550 | 13.800 | 12.900 | 75.150 | 150.050 |
| 23 | Kai Uemura | 12.800 | 10.000 | 13.050 | 13.350 | 13.700 | 12.000 | 74.900 | 150.050 |
| 24 | Erich Upton | 12.800 | 9.200 | 11.200 | 14.100 | 13.700 | 12.600 | 73.600 | 148.650 |
| 24 | Erich Upton | 12.900 | 11.500 | 11.300 | 13.500 | 13.250 | 12.600 | 75.050 | 148.650 |
| 25 | Tate Costa | 11.800 | 8.900 | 11.300 | 13.550 | 11.350 | 10.600 | 67.500 | 144.900 |
| 25 | Tate Costa | 12.800 | 12.200 | 12.400 | 13.650 | 13.500 | 12.850 | | 144.900 |
| 26 | Ian Gunther | 12.550 | – | 13.500 | 13.500 | 13.650 | 13.350 | 66.550 | 134.300 |
| 26 | Ian Gunther | 13.750 | – | 13.850 | 13.700 | 12.900 | 13.550 | 67.750 | 134.300 |
| 27 | Noah Newfeld | 13.250 | 13.150 | 13.550 | – | 13.650 | – | 53.600 | 106.760 |
| 27 | Noah Newfeld | 13.500 | 12.850 | 13.350 | – | 13.450 | – | 53.150 | 106.760 |
| 28 | Crew Bold | 13.600 | – | – | – | 13.150 | 13.350 | 40.100 | 81.000 |
| 28 | Crew Bold | 13.250 | – | – | – | 13.900 | 13.750 | 40.900 | 81.000 |
| 29 | Javier Alfonso | 12.900 | – | 14.250 | – | 13.450 | – | 40.600 | 79.800 |
| 29 | Javier Alfonso | 11.550 | – | 14.350 | – | 13.300 | – | 39.200 | 79.800 |
| 30 | Curran Phillips | 13.250 | – | – | 13.500 | 15.500 | 13.100 | 55.350 | 55.350 |
| 30 | Curran Phillips | – | – | – | – | – | – | – | 55.350 |
| 31 | Stephen Nedoroscik | – | 15.400 | – | – | – | – | 15.400 | 30.000 |
| 31 | Stephen Nedoroscik | – | 14.600 | – | – | – | – | 14.600 | 30.000 |
| 32 | Alex Diab | – | – | 14.800 | – | – | – | 14.800 | 29.450 |
| 32 | Alex Diab | – | – | 14.650 | – | – | – | 14.650 | 29.450 |
| 33 | Patrick Hoopes | – | 14.950 | – | – | – | – | 14.950 | 29.250 |
| 33 | Patrick Hoopes | – | 14.300 | – | – | – | – | 14.300 | 29.250 |
| 34 | Brandon Dang | – | 14.650 | | – | – | – | 14.650 | 29.050 |
| 34 | Brandon Dang | – | 14.400 | – | – | – | – | 14.400 | 29.050 |

== Women's national team ==
Following the competition the following female athletes were named to the senior national team: Simone Biles, Skye Blakely, Jade Carey, Dulcy Caylor, Jordan Chiles, Kayla DiCello, Shilese Jones, Sunisa Lee, Kaliya Lincoln, Eveylynn Lowe, Zoey Molomo, Hezly Rivera, Joscelyn Roberson, Simone Rose, Tiana Sumanasekera, and Leanne Wong.

The following junior athletes were named to the junior national team: Isabella Anzola, Harlow Buddendeck, Lavi Crain, Addy Fulcher, Gabrielle Hardie, Greta Krob, Jaysha McClendon, Claire Pease, Maliha Tressel, Tyler Turner, and Camie Westerman.

== Men's national team ==
After the competition the following male athletes were named to the senior national team: Fuzzy Benas, Jeremy Bischoff, Cameron Bock, Alex Diab, Asher Hong, Patrick Hoopes, Paul Juda, Brody Malone, Yul Moldauer, Stephen Nedoroscik, Curran Phillips, Fred Richard, Colt Walker, Donnell Whittenburg, Shane Wiskus and Khoi Young. The four athletes named to the senior development team were Tate Costa, Joshua Karnes, Kiran Mandava and Kai Uemura.

The following junior athletes were named to the junior national team: Nartey Brady, Ethan Cox, Troy Holman, Kiefer Hong, Maksim Kan, Danila Leykin, Rahul Mandava, Justin Park, Divier Ramos, Dante Reive, Ty Roderiques, Nathan Roman, Hunter Simpson and Jay Watkins.

== Participants ==
The following athletes qualified to compete at this event:

=== Senior women ===
- Simone Biles (World Champions Centre)
- Skye Blakely (WOGA)
- Ly Bui (GAGE) (V, UB only)
- Jade Carey (Oregon State University)
- Dulcy Caylor (World Champions Centre)
- Jordan Chiles (World Champions Centre)
- Chloe Cho (Gymnastics Olympica USA)
- Norah Christian (Cascade Elite West)
- Nicole Desmond (World Champions Centre)
- Kayla DiCello (Hill's Gymnastics)
- Amelia Disidore (GAGE)
- ~~Gabby Douglas (WOGA) (V, UB, BB only)~~
- Tatum Drusch (Flips Gymnastics)
- Reese Esponda (World Champions Centre)
- Addison Fatta (Prestige Gymnastics)
- Kieryn Finnell (RGA)
- Jayla Hang (Pacific Reign)
- Cambry Haynes (Adrenaline) (V, BB, FX only)
- Madray Johnson (WOGA)
- ~~Shilese Jones (Ascend Gymnastics Center)~~
- Katelyn Jong (Metroplex)
- Sunisa Lee (Midwest Gymnastics)
- Myli Lew (San Mateo Gymnastics)
- ~~Kaliya Lincoln (WOGA)~~
- Eveylynn Lowe (GAGE)
- Nola Matthews (Airborne Gymnastics)
- Annalisa Milton (GAGE)
- Malea Milton (GAGE)
- Zoey Molomo (Metroplex)
- Marissa Neal (GAGE)
- Brooke Pierson (World Champions Centre)
- Hezly Rivera (WOGA)
- Joscelyn Roberson (World Champions Centre)
- Simone Rose (Pacific Reign)
- Ashlee Sullivan (Metroplex)
- Tiana Sumanasekera (World Champions Centre)
- Trinity Thomas (University of Florida)
- Brynn Torry (World Class Gymnastics) (V, FX only)
- CaMarah Williams (EDGE Gymnastics – Riverside)
- Leanne Wong (University of Florida)
- Kelise Woolford (Buckeye Gymnastics)
- Lexi Zeiss (Twin City Twisters)

=== Senior men ===
- Javier Alfonso (University of Michigan)
- Fuzzy Benas (University of Oklahoma)
- Jeremy Bischoff (Stanford University)
- Landen Blixt (University of Michigan)
- Cameron Bock (University of Michigan)
- Crew Bold (University of Michigan)
- Taylor Burkhart (Stanford University)
- Taylor Christopulos (University of Nebraska)
- Caden Clinton (Cypress Academy of Gymnastics)
- Tate Costa (University of Illinois)
- Brandon Dang (University of Illinois)
- Alex Diab (EVO Gymnastics)
- Ian Gunther (Stanford University)
- Dallas Hale (5280 Gymnastics)
- Asher Hong (Stanford University)
- Patrick Hoopes (U.S. Air Force Academy)
- Paul Juda (University of Michigan)
- Joshua Karnes (Penn State University)
- Riley Loos (Stanford University)
- Brody Malone (EVO Gymnastics)
- Kiran Mandava (Cypress Academy of Gymnastics)
- Yul Moldauer (5280 Gymnastics)
- Stephen Nedoroscik (EVO Gymnastics)
- Noah Newfeld (UC Berkeley)
- Sam Phillips (University of Nebraska)
- ~~Curran Phillips (EVO Gymnastics)~~
- David Ramirez (Central Coast Gymnastics Sports Center)
- Fred Richard (University of Michigan)
- Dallin Tucker (Flip Force Gymnastics)
- Kai Uemura (Lakeshore Academy)
- Erich Upton (U.S. Air Force Academy)
- Colt Walker (Stanford University)
- Donnell Whittenburg (Salto Gymnastics)
- Shane Wiskus (EVO Gymnastics)
- Khoi Young (Stanford University)
