= 2024 Winter Cup =

Artistic gymnastics competition in the USA

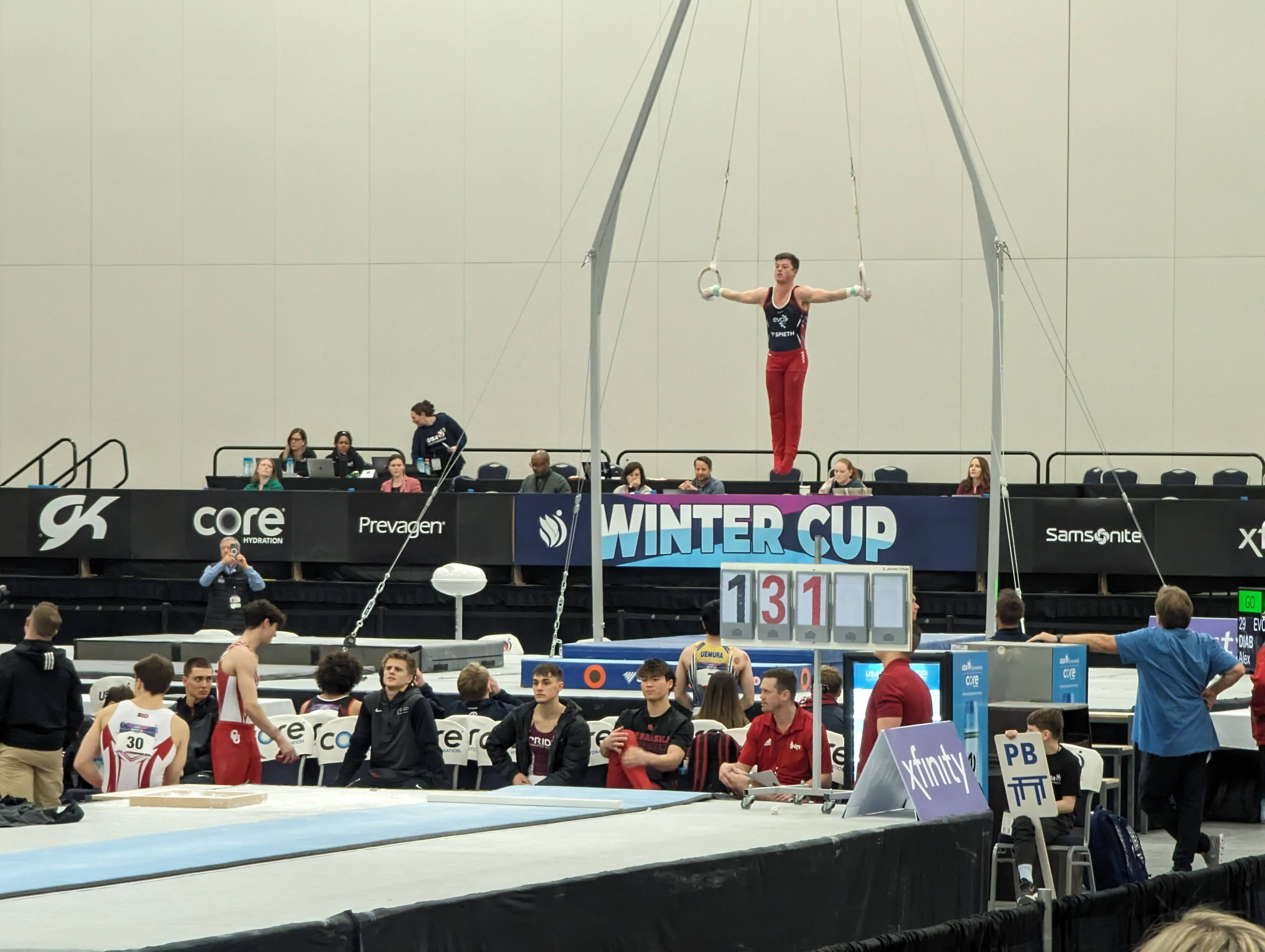
- Alex Diab at the 2024 Winter Cup
- Venue: Freedom Hall
- Location: Louisville, Kentucky, U.S.
- Dates: February 23–25, 2024

The 2024 Winter Cup, known officially as the Kentucky Winter Classic, was an artistic gymnastics competition held at Freedom Hall in Louisville, Kentucky, on February 23–25, 2024. As in recent years, the competition included men's and women's gymnastics.

== Background ==
The event was held in Louisville, which had hosted the previous Winter Cup.

Three-time Olympic champion Gabby Douglas, who had last competed eight years earlier at the 2016 Olympic Games, announced she would make her competitive comeback at the 2024 Winter Cup; she later withdrew after testing positive for COVID-19.

== Competition schedule ==
The competition had senior and junior competitions for both women's and men's disciplines. The competition schedule was (all times in eastern).

Friday, February 23:

- Winter Cup – Senior Men – Day 1, 1:30 p.m.
- Winter Cup – Junior Women, 7:00 p.m.

Saturday, February 24:

- Winter Cup – Senior Women, 1:00 p.m.
- Elite Team Cup; Junior Men Competition Day 1, 6:30 p.m.

Sunday, February 25:

- Nastia Liukin Cup, 12:00 p.m.
- Winter Cup – Senior and Junior Men – Day 2, 5:30 p.m.

== Medalists ==
| Event | Gold | Silver | Bronze |
|---|---|---|---|
Senior Women
| Individual all-around | Kayla DiCello | Skye Blakely | Hezly Rivera |
| Vault | Not awarded | | |
| Uneven bars | Kayla DiCello | Trinity Thomas | Katelyn Jong |
| Balance beam | Skye Blakely Hezly Rivera | Not awarded | Kayla DiCello |
| Floor | Kayla DiCello | Kaliya Lincoln | Hezly Rivera |
Junior Women
| Individual all-around | Claire Pease | Lavi Crain | Addy Fulcher Tyler Turner |
| Vault | Camie Westerman | Maliha Tressel | Not awarded |
| Uneven bars | Claire Pease | Addy Fulcher | Caroline Moreau |
| Balance beam | Claire Pease | Isabella Anzola | Caroline Moreau |
| Floor | Ally Damelio | Tyler Turner | Lavi Crain |
Senior Men
| Individual all-around | Yul Moldauer | Shane Wiskus | Riley Loos |
| Floor | Yul Moldauer | Joshua Karnes | Shane Wiskus |
| Pommel horse | Patrick Hoopes | Stephen Nedoroscik | Brandon Dang |
| Rings | Alex Diab | Donnell Whittenburg | Javier Alfonso |
| Vault | Kameron Nelson | Michael Artlip | Not awarded |
| Parallel bars | Curran Phillips | Yul Moldauer | Brody Malone |
| Horizontal bar | Curran Phillips | Jeremy Bischoff | Shane Wiskus |
Junior Men
| Individual all-around | Junnosuke Iwai | Nathan Roman | Kiran Mandava |
| Floor | Kyle Jordan | Junnosuke Iwai | Sasha Bogonosiuk |
| Pommel horse | Maksim Kan | Kiran Mandava | Wyatt Reynolds |
| Rings | Adam Lakomy | Conor Heary | Nathan Roman |
| Vault | David Ramirez | Junnosuke Iwai | Gage Kile |
| Parallel bars | Nathan Roman | Xander Hong | Kiran Mandava |
| Horizontal bar | Danila Leykin | Kyle Jordan | Kiran Mandava |

== National team and international assignments ==
Due to winning a team medal at the 2023 World Championships, all six members were automatically named to the men's national team: Asher Hong, Paul Juda, Yul Moldauer, Fred Richard, Colt Walker, and Khoi Young. Following the conclusion of the competition, the following individuals were also named to the national team: Fuzzy Benas, Jeremy Bischoff, Cameron Bock, Taylor Burkhart, Patrick Hoopes, Josh Karnes, Riley Loos, Brody Malone, Stephen Nedoroscik, Curran Phillips, Donnell Whittenburg, and Shane Wiskus. Additionally Landon Blixt retained his spot on the senior development team and Kai Uemura was added as well.

Additionally USA Gymnastics also announced upcoming international assignments. Hoopes, Nedoroscik, Katelyn Jong, and Reese Esponda were selected to compete at the Baku World Cup; Lavi Crain, Addy Fulcher, Claire Pease, and Tyler Turner were selected to compete at International Gymnix; Bock, Loos, Moldauer, Phillips, and Wiskus were selected to compete at the DTB Pokal Team Challenge; Uemura, Benas, Nola Matthews, Addison Fatta, and Dulcy Caylor were selected to compete at the DTB Pokal Mixed Cup; and Nedoroscik and Phillips were selected to compete at the Doha World Cup.

== Participants ==
=== Men ===
- Javier Alfonso (Michigan)
- Michael Artlip (Penn State)
- Fuzzy Benas (Oklahoma)
- Jeremy Bischoff (Stanford)
- Jaden Blank (Army)
- Landen Blixt (Michigan)
- Cameron Bock (Michigan)
- Crew Bold (Michigan)
- Garrett Braunton (Air Force)
- ~~Brandon Briones (Stanford)~~
- Taylor Burkhart (Stanford)
- Solen Chiodi (Mini-Hops Gymnastics)
- J.R. Chou (Stanford)
- Taylor Christopulos (Nebraska)
- Caden Clinton (Cypress Academy)
- Matt Cormier (Penn State)
- Tate Costa (Illinois)
- Brandon Dang (Illinois)
- Alex Diab (EVO Gymnastics)
- Isaiah Drake (Navy)
- Colin Flores (Oklahoma)
- Jack Freeman (Oklahoma)
- Ian Gunther (Stanford)
- Dallas Hale (Cypress Academy)
- Patrick Hoopes (Air Force)
- Evan Hymanson (Stanford)
- Paul Juda (Michigan)
- Joshua Karnes (Penn State)
- Jordan Kovach (Premier Gymnastics)
- Toby Liang (Nebraska)
- Riley Loos (Stanford)
- Brody Malone (EVO Gymnastics)
- Connor McCool (Illinois)
- Yul Moldauer (5280 Gymnastics)
- Stephen Nedoroscik (EVO Gymnastics)
- Kameron Nelson (Ohio State)
- Noah Newfeld (California)
- Brandon Nguyen (Stanford)
- Austin Padgett (Pride Gymnastics)
- Vahe Petrosyan (Illinois)
- Curran Phillips (EVO Gymnastics)
- Rithik Puri (Michigan)
- ~~Fred Richard (Michigan)~~
- Ian Sandoval (EVO Gymnastics)
- Blake Sun (Stanford)
- Kai Uemura (Lakeshore Academy)
- Donnell Whittenburg (Salto)
- Shane Wiskus (EVO Gymnastics)
- Ignacio Yockers (Oklahoma)

=== Women ===
- Skye Blakely (WOGA)
- Ly Bui (GAGE)
- Dulcy Caylor (WCC)
- ~~Jordan Chiles (WCC)~~
- Chloe Cho (Gymnastics Olympica)
- Norah Christian (Cascade Elite West)
- Nicole Desmond (WCC)
- Kayla DiCello (Hill's Gymnastics)
- ~~Gabby Douglas (WOGA)~~
- Tatum Drusch (Flips Gymnastics LLC)
- Reese Esponda (Roots Gymnastics)
- Addison Fatta (Prestige)
- Jayla Hang (Pacific Reign)
- Madray Johnson (WOGA)
- Katelyn Jong (Metroplex)
- Sunisa Lee (Midwest Gymnastics)
- Myli Lew (San Mateo Gymnastics)
- Kaliya Lincoln (WOGA)
- Evey Lowe (GAGE)
- Nola Matthews (Airborne)
- ~~Zoe Miller (WCC)~~
- Annalisa Milton (GAGE)
- Malea Milton (GAGE)
- Zoey Molomo (Metroplex)
- Marissa Neal (GAGE)
- Brooke Pierson (WCC)
- Michelle Pineda (Metroplex)
- Hezly Rivera (WOGA)
- Simone Rose (Pacific Reign)
- Lacie Saltzmann (Texas Dreams)
- Audrey Snyder (First State)
- Ashlee Sullivan (Metroplex)
- Tiana Sumanasekera (WCC)
- Trinity Thomas (University of Florida)
- Maliha Tressel (Twin City Twisters)
- Camie Westerman (Hill's Gymnastics)
- CaMarah Williams (EDGE Gymnastics)
- Kelise Woolford (Buckeye Gymnastics)
- Lexi Zeiss (Twin City Twisters)
- Alicia Zhou (Love Gymnastics)

== Nastia Liukin Cup ==
2024 Nastia Liukin Cup
- Venue: Freedom Hall
- Location: Louisville, Kentucky, U.S.
- Dates: February 25, 2024
- Competitors: 44

Medalists
| gold medal | Elle Mueller (Senior); Ella Kate Parker (Junior) |
| silver medal | Avery Neff (Senior); Ella Fine (Junior) |
| bronze medal | Ella Murphy (Senior); Morgan Reihl (Junior) |

The 15th annual Nastia Liukin Cup was held in conjunction with the 2024 Winter Cup.

=== Medal winners ===
| Event | Gold | Silver | Bronze |
|---|---|---|---|
Senior
| All-around | Elle Mueller | Avery Neff | Ella Murphy |
Junior
| All-around | Ella Kate Parker | Ella Fine | Morgan Reihl |
