= Nola Matthews =

American artistic gymnast

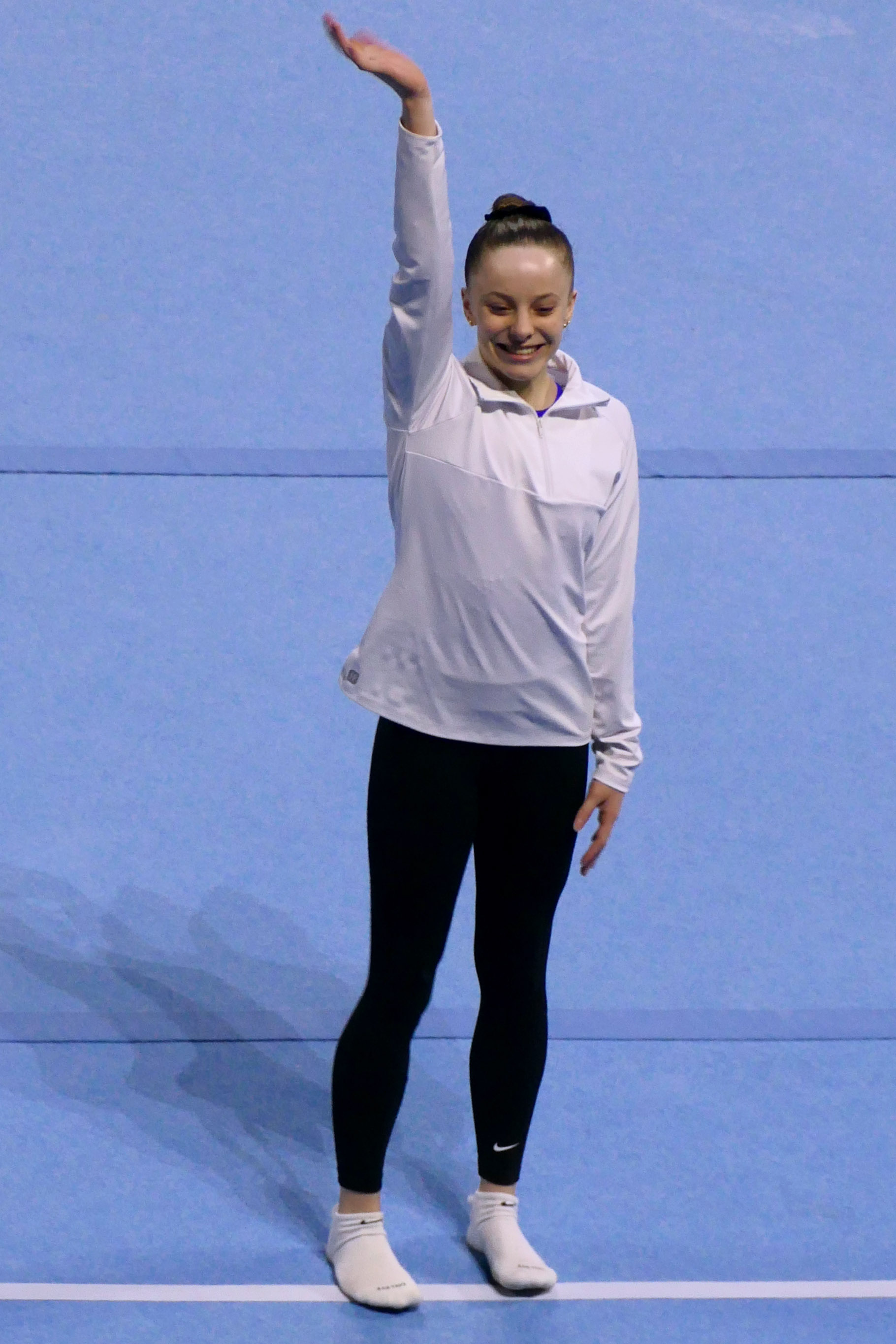
- Matthews in 2024

Personal information
- Full name: Nola Rhianne Matthews
- Nickname: Nols
- Born: September 20, 2006 (age 20) San Jose, California, U.S.

Gymnastics career
- Discipline: Women's artistic gymnastics
- Country represented: United States; (2022–2025)
- College team: UCLA Bruins (2026–2029)
- Club: Airborne Gymnastics Training Center
- Head coach: Cleo Washington
- Assistant coaches: Tonya Piacente, Melissa Metcalf, Melanie Ruggiero
Medal record
Women's artistic gymnastics
Representing the United States
Pan American Championships
Gold medal – first place	2023 Medellín	Team
Gold medal – first place	2023 Medellín	Uneven bars
FIG World Cup
Event / 1st / 2nd / 3rd; World Challenge Cup / 2 / 0 / 0

Nola Rhianne Matthews (born September 20, 2006) is an American artistic gymnast. She is the 2023 Pan American uneven bars champion.

== Early life ==
Matthews was born on September 20, 2006, in San Jose, California to physician parents Drs. Kari Bertrand (ob-gyn) and AJ Matthews (plastic surgery). Bertrand was a two-time Olympic Trials qualifier and an All-American runner for Georgetown University. Matthews began gymnastics when she was two years old.

== Junior gymnastics career ==
=== 2017–18 ===
Matthews competed at the 2017 Hopes Classic and finished 15th with an all-around score of 44.500, meaning she was 0.500 away from qualifying for the Hopes Championships. She finished 41st in the all-around at the 2018 Hopes Classic and did not qualify for the Hopes Championships. She then competed with her club at the Tournoi International in Combs-la-Ville, France. She won the silver medal in the espoir all-around behind Levi Jung-Ruivivar. She won the gold medals on the uneven bars and balance beam in the event finals.

=== 2019 ===
Matthews began competing in junior elite in 2019. She made her elite debut at the American Classic where she finished ninth in the all-around and placed third on the uneven bars. Then at the U.S. Classic, she finished 22nd in the all-around and qualified for the U.S. Championships. She then finished 21st in the all-around at the U.S. Championships. She went to the Tournoi International again with her club, and she finished fifth in the all-around. She finished sixth on vault and floor exercise, and she won the gold medal on the uneven bars.

=== 2021 ===
Matthews did not compete in 2020 due to the COVID-19 pandemic in the United States. She returned to competition at the 2021 Winter Cup, and she finished fifth in the all-around and won the silver medal on the uneven bars behind Levi Jung-Ruivivar. Then at the American Classic, she finished ninth in the all-around. She did not compete floor exercise at the U.S. Classic, and she finished 17th on vault, 11th on uneven bars, and 10th on balance beam. She then finished thirteenth in the all-around at the U.S. National Championships.

== Senior gymnastics career ==
=== 2022 ===
Matthews became age-eligible for senior competition in 2022. She made her senior debut at the Winter Cup and finished fifth in the all-around and won the gold on uneven bars. She then made her senior international debut at the DTB Pokal Team Challenge and won a gold medal with the American team. She won the bronze medal in the uneven bars final behind Giorgia Villa and Romi Brown. Then at the U.S. Classic, she finished sixth in the all-around and won silver on the uneven bars behind Shilese Jones. She finished 13th in the all-around at the U.S. Championships and fourth on the uneven bars.

=== 2023 ===
Matthews won the all-around bronze medal at the Winter Cup behind Lexi Zeiss and Ashlee Sullivan. She then competed at the DTB Pokal Team Challenge alongside Sullivan, Zoe Miller, Joscelyn Roberson, and they won the team gold medal. In April, she was named to the team to compete at the Pan American Championships alongside Miller, Roberson, Tiana Sumanasekera, Addison Fatta, and traveling replacement athlete Madray Johnson. She won the gold medal on the uneven bars and finished fourth in the all-around. The team then won the gold medal in the team final.

=== 2024 ===
Matthews competed at the DTB Pokal Mixed Cup in March alongside Addison Fatta, Dulcy Caylor, Kai Uemura, Fuzzy Benas, and Riley Loos; together they placed first. She next competed at the 2024 U.S. Classic and the 2024 U.S. National Championships where she placed fourteenth and eighteenth in the all-around respectively. Due to her low placement at the National Championships, she was not selected to compete at the 2024 Olympic Trials. In November Matthews signed her National Letter of Intent with the UCLA Bruins.

=== 2025 ===
Matthews competed at the 2025 Winter Cup where she placed fifth in the all-around and was re-added to the national team. She competed at the DTB Pokal Mixed Cup alongside Simone Rose, Ashlee Sullivan, Riley Loos, Kiran Mandava, and Alex Nitache; together they placed first as a team. In May Matthews competed at the Varna World Challenge Cup where she won gold on uneven bars and floor exercise and placed fifth on balance beam.

== NCAA gymnastics career ==
=== Regular season rankings ===
Season	All-Around	Vault	Uneven Bars	Balance Beam	Floor Exercise
2026	N/A	N/A	57	N/A	N/A

== Competitive history ==
Competitive history of Nola Matthews at the junior level
Year	Event	Team	AA	VT	UB	BB	FX
2017	Hopes Classic		15	14	10	13	15
2018	Hopes Classic		41	20	44	5	11
2018	Tournoi International		2nd place, silver medalist(s)		1st place, gold medalist(s)	1st place, gold medalist(s)	
2019	American Classic		9	24	11	3rd place, bronze medalist(s)	15
2019	U.S. Classic		22	30	24	7	26
2019	U.S. National Championships		21	29	17	14	22
2019	Tournoi International		5	6	1st place, gold medalist(s)		6
2021	Winter Cup		5	12	2nd place, silver medalist(s)	9	9
2021	American Classic		9	13	12	4	9
2021	U.S. Classic			17	11	10	
2021	U.S. National Championships		13	9	6	10	13

Competitive history of Nola Matthews at the senior level
Year	Event	Team	AA	VT	UB	BB	FX
2022	Winter Cup		5		1st place, gold medalist(s)	7	9
2022	DTB Pokal Team Challenge	1st place, gold medalist(s)			3rd place, bronze medalist(s)		
2022	U.S. Classic		6		2nd place, silver medalist(s)	4	8
2022	U.S. National Championships		13		4	19	16
2023	Winter Cup		3rd place, bronze medalist(s)		5	6	4
2023	DTB Pokal Team Challenge	1st place, gold medalist(s)					
2023	Pan American Championships	1st place, gold medalist(s)	4		1st place, gold medalist(s)		
2023	U.S. Classic		4		4	6	5
2023	U.S. National Championships		12		10	13	10
2024	Winter Cup		12		19	14	5
2024	DTB Pokal Mixed Cup	1st place, gold medalist(s)					
2024	U.S. Classic		14		9	14	19
2024	U.S. National Championships		18		10	24	19
2025	Winter Cup		5		13	6	1st place, gold medalist(s)
2025	DTB Pokal Mixed Cup	1st place, gold medalist(s)					
2025	Varna World Challenge Cup				1st place, gold medalist(s)	5	1st place, gold medalist(s)
2025	U.S. Classic		12		8	12	14
2025	U.S. National Championships		14		12	13	9
