= 2019 U.S. Classic =

2019 GK U.S. Classic
- Venue: KFC Yum! Center
- Location: Louisville, Kentucky
- Dates: July 20, 2019

Medalists
gold medal	Simone Biles; Konnor McClain
silver medal	Riley McCusker; Sydney Barros
bronze medal	Grace McCallum; Olivia Greaves

The 2019 U.S. Classic, known as the 2019 GK U.S. Classic for sponsorship reasons, is the 36th edition of the U.S. Classic gymnastics tournament. The competition was held on July 20, 2019, at the KFC Yum! Center in Louisville, Kentucky.

== Medalists ==
Event	Gold	Silver	Bronze
Senior
All-Around	Simone Biles	Riley McCusker	Grace McCallum
Vault	Jade Carey	Aleah Finnegan	Shilese Jones
Uneven Bars	Morgan Hurd	Sunisa Lee	Grace McCallum Riley McCusker
Balance Beam	Kara Eaker	Riley McCusker	Simone Biles
Floor Exercise	Simone Biles	Jade Carey Grace McCallum	Not awarded
Junior
All-Around	Konnor McClain	Sydney Barros	Olivia Greaves
Vault	Konnor McClain	Skye Blakely	Sydney Barros Sophia Butler
Uneven Bars	Olivia Greaves	Sydney Morris	Kayla DiCello Zoe Miller
Balance Beam	Konnor McClain	Ciena Alipio	Sydney Barros
Floor Exercise	Skye Blakely	Sydney Barros	Sophia Butler

== Participants ==
=== Seniors ===
- Shania Adams – Plain City, Ohio (Buckeye Gymnastics)
- Simone Biles – Spring, Texas (World Champions Centre)
- Sloane Blakely – Frisco, Texas (WOGA)
- Jade Carey – Phoenix, Arizona (Arizona Sunrays)
- Jordan Chiles – Spring, Texas (World Champions Centre)
- Kara Eaker – Grain Valley, Missouri (GAGE)
- Aleah Finnegan – Lee's Summit, Missouri (GAGE)
- Jaylene Gilstrap – McKinney, Texas (Metroplex Gymnastics)
- Olivia Hollingsworth – Seabrook, Texas (World Champions Centre)
- Morgan Hurd – Middletown, Delaware (First State Gymnastics)
- Alexis Jeffrey – Warrensburg, Missouri (GAGE)
- Shilese Jones – Westerville, Ohio (Future Gymnastics)
- Emily Lee – Los Gatos, California (West Valley Gymnastics)
- Sunisa Lee – St. Paul, Minnesota (Midwest Gymnastics)
- Emma Malabuyo – Flower Mound, Texas (Texas Dreams Gymnastics)
- Grace McCallum – Isanti, Minnesota (Twin City Twisters)
- Riley McCusker – Brielle, New Jersey (MG Elite)
- Victoria Nguyen – Sugar Land, Texas (Everest Gymnastics)
- Gabby Perea – Geneva, Illinois (Legacy Elite Gymnastics)
- MyKayla Skinner – Gilbert, Arizona (Desert Lights Gymnastics)
- Trinity Thomas – York, Pennsylvania (University of Florida Gymnastics)
- Faith Torrez – Pleasant Prairie, Wisconsin (Champions Centre)
- Abigael Vides – Spring, Texas (World Champions Centre)
- Leanne Wong – Overland Park, Kansas (GAGE)

=== Juniors ===
- Olivia Ahern – Memphis, Tennessee (River City Gymnastics Inc)
- Ciena Alipio – San Jose, California (West Valley Gymnastics
- Sydney Barros – Woodstock, Georgia (Texas Dreams Gymnastics)
- Skye Blakely – Frisco, Texas (WOGA)
- Charlotte Booth – Clermont, Florida (Johnson's Global Gymnastics)
- Sophia Butler – Houston, Texas (Discover Gymnastics)
- Kailin Chio – Henderson, Nevada (Gymcats)
- Kayla DiCello – Boyds, Maryland (Hill's Gymnastics)
- Addison Fatta – Wrightsville, Pennsylvania (Prestige Gymnastics)
- eMjae Frazier – Erial, New Jersey (Parkettes)
- Elizabeth Gantner – Indianapolis, Indiana (Jaycie Phelps Athletic Center)
- Karis German – Spring, Texas (World Champions Center)
- Olivia Greaves – Staten Island, New York (MG Elite)
- Mia Heather – San Francisco, California (San Mateo Gymnastics)
- Julianne Huff – Hoover, Alabama (JamJev Gymnastics)
- Levi Jung-Ruivivar – Woodland Hills, California (Paramount Elite)
- Lilly Lippeatt – Mason, Ohio (Cincinnati Gymnastics)
- Lauren Little – Mooresville, North Carolina (Everest Gymnastics)
- Amber Lowe – Huntersville, North Carolina (Everest Gymnastics)
- Nola Matthews – Gilroy, California (Airborne Gymnastics)
- Konnor McClain – Cross Lanes, West Virginia (Revolution Gymnastics)
- Zoe Miller – Spring, Texas (World Champions Centre)
- Kaylen Morgan – Huntersville, North Carolina (Everest Gymanstics)
- Sydney Morris – Bowie, Maryland (First State Gymnastics)
- Annalise Newman-Achee – Brooklyn, New York (Chelsea Piers Gymnastics)
- Sophie Parenti – Menlo Park, California (San Mateo Gymnastics)
- Anya Pilgrim – Germantown, Maryland (Hill's Gymnastics)
- Ariel Posen – Manalapan, New Jersey (MG Elite)
- Joscelyn Roberson – Texarkana, Texas (North East Texas Elite Gymnastics)
- Sienna Robinson – Las Vegas, Nevada (Browns Gymanstics)
- Katelyn Rosen – Boerne, Texas (Mavericks at Artemovs)
- Lyden Saltness – Forest Lake, Minnesota (Midwest Gymnastics)
- Jamison Sears – Yorktown, Virginia (World Class Gymnastics)
- Chavala Shepard – Bentonville, Arkansas (Hopes and Dreams Gymnastics)
- Ava Siegfeldt – Hampton, Virginia (World Class Gymnastics)
- Eva Volpe – Pearland, Texas (Pearland Elite)
- Jamie Wright – Toano, Virginia (World Class Gymnastics)
- Ella Zirbes – Stillwater, Minnesota (Flips Gymnastics)
