= Addison Fatta =

American artistic gymnast

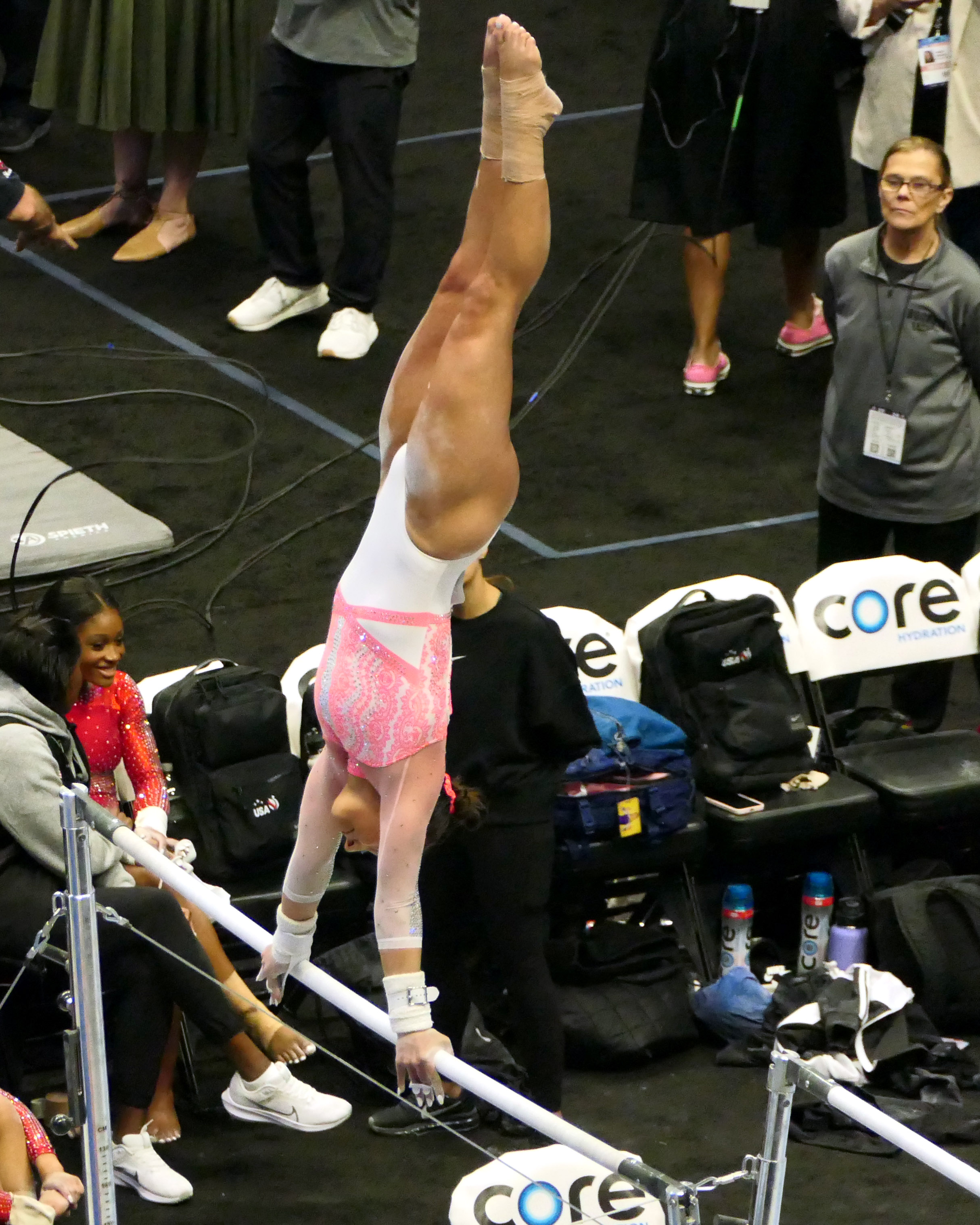
- Fatta competing on uneven bars at the 2024 U.S. Classic

Personal information
- Full name: Addison Grace Fatta
- Born: November 23, 2004 (age 21) Lancaster, Pennsylvania USA

Gymnastics career
- Discipline: Women's artistic gymnastics
- Country represented: United States (2021–2024)
- College team: Oklahoma Sooners (2025–2028)
- Club: Prestige Gymnastics
- Head coaches: Tony Fatta; Jen Fatta
Medal record
Representing the United States
Pan American Championships
Gold medal – first place	2023 Medellín	Team
Silver medal – second place	2022 Rio de Janeiro	Team
Silver medal – second place	2023 Medellín	Uneven bars
Event / 1st / 2nd / 3rd; World Challenge Cup / 1 / 0 / 1
Representing Oklahoma Sooners
NCAA Championships
Gold medal – first place	2025 Fort Worth	Team
Gold medal – first place	2026 Fort Worth	Team

Addison Grace Fatta (/ˈfeɪtə/ FEY-ta) (born November 23, 2004) is an American artistic gymnast. She was part of the gold medal winning team at the 2023 Pan American Championships.

== Early life ==
Fatta was born to Tony and Jen Fatta in 2004 in Lancaster, Pennsylvania. She started gymnastics in 2005.

== Junior gymnastics career ==
Fatta qualified as an elite-level gymnast in 2017. She competed at the American Classic, the U.S. Classic, and at her first National Championships.

In 2018 Fatta only competed at the American Classic and the U.S. Classic.

In 2019, her last year as a junior level gymnast, Fatta competed at the U.S. Classic and at the 2019 National Championships. She finished 13th in the all-around.

== Senior gymnastics career ==
=== 2021 ===
Fatta competed at the 2021 Winter Cup where she placed seventh in the all-around. In late May Fatta competed at the U.S. Classic where she only competed on uneven bars and balance beam. In June she competed at her first senior-level National Championships. She placed sixteenth in the all-around but qualified to compete at the upcoming Olympic Trials. Additionally she was named to the national team for the first time. At the Olympic Trials Fatta finished eleventh in the all-around.

=== 2022 ===
Fatta competed at the 2022 Winter Cup where she placed eleventh in the all-around. In July Fatta was selected as the alternate for the Pan American Championships team.

In August Fatta competed at the National Championships. She finished tenth in the all-around. In September Fatta competed at the Szombathely Challenge World Cup alongside Katelyn Jong and Levi Jung-Ruivivar. While there Fatta won gold on vault and bronze on the uneven bars.

In November Fatta signed her National Letter of Intent with the Oklahoma Sooners.

=== 2023 ===
Fatta was named to the team to compete at the Pan American Championships alongside Zoe Miller, Joscelyn Roberson, Tiana Sumanasekera, Nola Matthews and traveling replacement athlete Madray Johnson. During qualifications, which also served as individual finals, she helped the USA team qualify to the team final in first place, and individually she won the silver medal on uneven bars with a score of 13.667, behind Nola Matthews. Fatta also competed on floor exercise, earning a score of 12.167. During the team final, Fatta scored a 13.150 on vault and a 13.700 on uneven bars to help the USA win the team gold medal.

== NCAA gymnastics career ==
=== NCAA Regular season ranking ===
Season	All-Around	Vault	Uneven Bars	Balance Beam	Floor Exercise
2025	26th	69th	25th	24th	47th
2026	4th	2nd	25th	23rd	18th

== Competitive history ==
Year	Event	Team	AA	VT	UB	BB	FX
Junior
2017	American Classic		20	19	19	18	21
2017	U.S. Classic		10	10	20	21	20
2017	U.S. National Championships		28	27	18	25	25
2018	American Classic		17	17	12	11	34
2018	U.S. Classic		21	6	30	24	32
2019	U.S. Classic		17	8	24	31	15
2019	U.S. National Championships		13	6	9	27	25
Senior
2021	Winter Cup		7	5	11	14	17
2021	American Classic		4	2nd place, silver medalist(s)	7	14	8
2021	U.S. Classic				5	15	
2021	U.S. National Championships		16		10	21	15
2021	Olympic Trials		11		13	13	11
2022	Winter Cup		11		6	13	20
2022	Pan American Championships	(silver) (Note: Fatta was the team USA alternate)					
2022	U.S. Classic				6	5	
2022	U.S. National Championships		10		11	18	11
2022	Szombathely Challenge Cup			1st place, gold medalist(s)	3rd place, bronze medalist(s)		
2022	Swiss Cup	1st place, gold medalist(s)					
2023	Winter Cup		10	2nd place, silver medalist(s)	10	24	7
2023	DTB Pokal Mixed Cup	4					
2023	Pan American Championships	1st place, gold medalist(s)			2nd place, silver medalist(s)		
2023	U.S. Classic			4		21	
2023	U.S. National Championships		17	5	9	23	19
2024	Winter Cup		6		4	23	8
2024	DTB Pokal Mixed Cup	1st place, gold medalist(s)					
2024	American Classic				2nd place, silver medalist(s)		
2024	U.S. Classic				8	29	
2024	U.S. National Championships		19		20	27	24
NCAA
2025	SEC Championships	2nd place, silver medalist(s)	8	11	12	11	38
2025	NCAA Championships	1st place, gold medalist(s)	14	25	36	24	28
2026	SEC Championships	2nd place, silver medalist(s)	5				
2026	NCAA Championships	1st place, gold medalist(s)				45	
