= 2021 Winter Cup =

Artistic gymnastics competition in the USA

- Venue: Indiana Convention Center
- Location: Indianapolis, Indiana, U.S.
- Dates: February 26–28, 2021

The 2021 Winter Cup was an artistic gymnastics competition held at the Indiana Convention Center in Indianapolis. In past iterations it was only for men's artistic gymnasts, however, this competition was the first time that women's artistic gymnasts were included.

== Competition schedule ==
The competition featured Senior and Junior competitions for both women's and men's disciplines. The preliminary competition schedule was as follows:

- Friday, February 26: Men's Day 1 – 7:30 p.m. ET,
- Saturday, February 27: Senior Women's (Main session) – 12:30 p.m. ET
- Saturday, February 27: Elite Team Cup – 5:30 p.m. ET
- Sunday, February 28: Junior Women's (and remaining Senior Women) – 12 p.m. ET
- Sunday, February 28: Men's Day 2 – 5:30 p.m. ET

== Medalists ==
| Event | Gold | Silver | Bronze |
|---|---|---|---|
Senior Women
| Individual all-around | Jordan Chiles | Shilese Jones | Emily Lee |
| Vault | Jordan Chiles | Jade Carey | Konnor McClain |
| Uneven bars | Sunisa Lee | Riley McCusker | Shilese Jones |
| Balance beam | Skye Blakely | Jordan Chiles | Sunisa Lee |
| Floor | Jordan Chiles | Emily Lee | Shilese Jones Lilly Lippeatt |
Junior Women
| Individual all-around | Ella Kate Parker | Joscelyn Roberson | Madray Johnson |
| Vault | Katelyn Jong | Ashlee Sullivan | Charlotte Booth |
| Uneven bars | Levi Jung-Ruivivar | Nola Matthews | Autumn Reingold |
| Balance beam | Joscelyn Roberson | Ella Kate Parker | Madray Johnson |
| Floor | Paloma Spiridonova | Tiana Sumanasekera | Joscelyn Roberson |
Senior Men
| Individual all-around | Cameron Bock | Riley Loos | Yul Moldauer |
| Floor | Shane Wiskus | Eddie Penev | Yul Moldauer |
| Pommel horse | Alec Yoder | Stephen Nedoroscik | Cameron Bock |
| Rings | Alex Diab | Donnell Whittenburg | Cameron Bock Shane Wiskus |
| Vault | Eddie Penev | Mike Fletcher | Kiwan Watts Khoi Young Adrian De Los Angeles Shane Wiskus |
| Parallel bars | Yul Moldauer | Shane Wiskus | Alec Yoder |
| Horizontal bar | Genki Suzuki | Shane Wiskus | Marvin Kimble |

== Results ==
=== Women ===
==== Seniors ====
| Rank | Gymnast | Gym | Vault (gymnastics) | Uneven bars | Balance beam | Floor (gymnastics) | Total |
|---|---|---|---|---|---|---|---|
| 1st place, gold medalist(s) | Jordan Chiles | World Champions Centre | 14.900 | 14.050 | 14.500 | 13.600 | 57.050 |
| 2nd place, silver medalist(s) | Shilese Jones | Future Gymnastics Academy | 14.550 | 14.400 | 13.200 | 12.950 | 55.100 |
| 3rd place, bronze medalist(s) | Emily Lee | West Valley Gymnastics | 14.350 | 11.800 | 13.900 | 13.350 | 53.400 |
| 4 | Lilly Lippeatt | Cincinnati Gymnastics Academy | 13.700 | 13.350 | 13.250 | 12.950 | 53.250 |
| 5 | Amari Drayton | World Champions Centre | 14.200 | 13.450 | 12.650 | 12.650 | 52.950 |
| 6 | Ciena Alipio | Midwest Gymnastics Center | 13.550 | 13.400 | 13.000 | 12.700 | 52.650 |
| 7 | Addison Fatta | Prestige Gymnastics | 14.350 | 13.350 | 13.150 | 11.750 | 52.600 |
| 8 | Zoe Miller | World Champions Centre | 13.600 | 14.050 | 12.150 | 12.700 | 52.500 |
| 9 | Karis German | World Champions Centre | 13.900 | 12.700 | 12.300 | 12.850 | 51.750 |
| 10 | Lyden Saltness | Midwest Gymnastics Center | 13.950 | 13.350 | 11.900 | 12.450 | 51.650 |
| 11 | Lexi Zeiss | Omaha Gymnastics Academy | 14.100 | 12.400 | 13.300 | 11.800 | 51.600 |
| 12 | Elle Mueller | Twin City Twisters | 13.550 | 11.950 | 13.650 | 12.300 | 51.450 |
| 13 | Hailey Klein | Flips Gymnastics | 14.100 | 11.950 | 12.700 | 11.850 | 50.600 |
| 14 | Olivia Greaves | World Champions Centre | 13.500 | 13.600 | 11.650 | 11.450 | 50.200 |
| 15 | Alonna Kratzer | Top Notch Training | 13.600 | 11.950 | 12.200 | 12.000 | 49.750 |
| 16 | Jade Carey | Arizona Sunrays | 14.800 | 13.600 | 13.550 | – | 41.950 |
| 17 | Riley McCusker | Arizona Sunrays | 14.050 | 14.650 | 12.600 | – | 41.300 |
| 18 | Emma Malabuyo | Texas Dreams Gymnastics | 13.500 | – | 13.900 | 11.500 | 38.900 |
| 19 | Sydney Barros | Texas Dreams Gymnastics | 13.050 | – | 12.850 | 12.550 | 38.450 |
| 20 | Sunisa Lee | Midwest Gymnastics Center | – | 15.050 | 14.250 | – | 29.300 |
| 21 | Konnor McClain | Revolution Gymnastics | 14.700 | – | 14.000 | – | 28.700 |
| 22 | Skye Blakely | WOGA | – | – | 14.500 | 12.650 | 27.150 |
| 23 | Laurie Hernandez | Gym-Max | – | – | 13.950 | 12.050 | 26.000 |
| 24 | eMjae Frazier | Parkettes | – | 4.100 | 12.250 | – | 16.350 |
| 25 | Temple Landry | Twin City Twisters | – | – | 13.400 | – | 13.400 |
| 26 | Sienna Robinson | Brown's Gymnastics | – | – | 12.000 | – | 12.000 |

==== Juniors ====
| Rank | Gymnast | Gym | Vault (gymnastics) | Uneven bars | Balance beam | Floor (gymnastics) | Total |
|---|---|---|---|---|---|---|---|
| 1st place, gold medalist(s) | Ella Kate Parker | Cincinnati Gymnastics Academy | 13.600 | 12.350 | 13.600 | 12.800 | 52.350 |
| 2nd place, silver medalist(s) | Joscelyn Roberson | North East Texas Elite | 13.550 | 10.950 | 13.800 | 12.850 | 51.150 |
| 3rd place, bronze medalist(s) | Madray Johnson | WOGA | 13.600 | 12.000 | 13.150 | 12.400 | 51.150 |
| 4 | Charlotte Booth | Brandy Johnson's | 13.850 | 12.450 | 12.500 | 11.750 | 50.550 |
| 5 | Nola Matthews | Airborne Gymnastics | 12.950 | 13.150 | 12.100 | 12.350 | 50.550 |
| 6 | Levi Jung-Ruivivar | Twin City Twisters | 13.250 | 13.200 | 12.150 | 11.500 | 50.100 |
| 7 | Tiana Sumanasekera | West Valley Gymnastics | 13.650 | 10.650 | 12.450 | 13.050 | 49.800 |
| 8 | Katelyn Jong | Metroplex Gymnastics | 14.300 | 11.500 | 11.400 | 12.550 | 49.750 |
| 9 | Paloma Spiridonova | WOGA | 12.750 | 11.000 | 12.700 | 13.150 | 49.600 |
| 10 | Ashlee Sullivan | WOGA | 14.100 | 12.350 | 10.200 | 12.450 | 49.100 |
| 11 | Lucy Tobia | Parkettes Gymnastics | 13.050 | 9.850 | 12.950 | 12.150 | 48.000 |
| 12 | Autumn Reingold | Gymnastics Olympica USA | 12.700 | 12.950 | 10.650 | 10.900 | 47.200 |
| 13 | Michelle Pineda | Metroplex Gymnastics | 13.200 | 10.550 | 9.150 | 12.000 | 44.900 |
| 14 | Kaliya Lincoln | WOGA | 13.600 | – | – | 12.500 | 26.100 |

== Participants ==
The following individuals participated in the competition:

=== WAG Seniors ===
- Ciena Alipio (Midwest Gymnastics Center)
- Sydney Barros (Texas Dreams Gymnastics)
- Skye Blakely (WOGA Gymnastics)
- Jade Carey (Arizona Sunrays)
- Jordan Chiles (World Champions Centre)
- ~~Kayla DiCello~~ (Hill's Gymnastics)
- Amari Drayton (World Champions Centre)
- Addison Fatta (Prestige Gymnastics)
- eMjae Frazier (Parkettes)
- Karis German (World Champions Centre)
- Olivia Greaves (World Champions Centre)
- Laurie Hernandez (Gym-Max Gymnastics)
- Shilese Jones (Future Gymnastics Academy)
- Hailey Klein (Flips Gymnastics North Shore)
- Alonna Kratzer (Top Notch Training Center)
- Temple Landry (Twin City Twisters)
- Emily Lee (West Valley Gymnastics School)
- Sunisa Lee (Midwest Gymnastics Center)
- Lilly Lippeatt (Cincinnati Gymnastics)
- Emma Malabuyo (Texas Dreams Gymnastics)
- Konnor McClain (Revolution Gymnastics)
- Riley McCusker (Arizona Sunrays)
- Zoe Miller (World Champions Centre)
- Elle Mueller (Twin City Twisters)
- Sienna Robinson (Browns Gymnastics Las Vegas)
- ~~Katelyn Rosen~~ (Mavericks Gymnastics)
- Lyden Saltness (Midwest Gymnastics Center)
- ~~Faith Torrez~~ (Legacy Elite Gymnastics)
- Lexi Zeiss (Omaha Gymnastics Academy)

=== WAG Juniors ===
- Charlotte Booth (Brandy Johnson's Global Gymnastics)
- Madray Johnson (WOGA Gymnastics)
- Katelyn Jong (Metroplex Gymnastics)
- Levi Jung-Ruivivar (Twin City Twisters)
- Kaliya Lincoln (WOGA Gymnastics)
- Nola Matthews (Airborne Gymnastics Training Center)
- Zoey Molomo (Metroplex Gymnastics)
- Ella Kate Parker (Cincinnati Gymnastics)
- Michelle Pineda (Metroplex Gymnastics)
- Autumn Reingold (Gymnastics Olympica USA)
- Joscelyn Roberson (North East Texas Elite Gymnastics)
- Paloma Spiridonova (WOGA Gymnastics)
- Ashlee Sullivan (WOGA Gymnastics)
- Tiana Sumanasekera (West Valley Gymnastics School)
- Lucy Tobia (Parkettes National Gymnastics Center)

=== MAG Seniors ===
- Landen Blixt (Infinity Gymnastics Academy)
- Cameron Bock (University of Michigan)
- Crew Bold (University of Minnesota)
- Allan Bower (University of Oklahoma)
- Garrett Braunton (USAF Academy)
- Taylor Burkhart (5280 Gymnastics)
- Adrian De Los Angeles (USOTC)
- Alex Diab (University of Illinois)
- Isaiah Drake (Gymnastics Olympica USA)
- Mike Fletcher (University of Illinois)
- Vitaliy Guimaraes (University of Oklahoma)
- Paul Juda (University of Michigan)
- Marvin Kimble (Salto Gymnastics Center)
- Riley Loos (Stanford University)
- Yul Moldauer (5280 Gymnastics)
- Michael Moran (University of Minnesota)
- Stephen Nedoroscik (Penn State University)
- Robert Neff (USOTC)
- Kanji Oyama (USOTC)
- Eddie Penev (USOTC)
- Genki Suzuki (University of Oklahoma)
- Timothy Wang (USAF Academy)
- Kiwan Watts (Sun Devil Gymnastic Club)
- Matt Wenske (University of Oklahoma)
- Donnell Whittenburg (Salto Gymnastics Center)
- Shane Wiskus (University of Minnesota)
- Alec Yoder (Ohio State)
- Khoi Young (Sportsplex Gymnastics)

== Nastia Liukin Cup ==
The Nastia Liukin Cup
- Venue: Indiana Convention Center
- Location: Indianapolis, Indiana, U.S.
- Dates: February 26, 2021
- Competitors: 36

The 12th annual Nastia Liukin Cup was held in conjunction with the 2021 Winter Cup. Since its inception in 2010, the competition has always been held on the Friday night before the American Cup, in the same arena. However, the American Cup was not held in 2021; therefore it was held in conjunction with the Winter Cup.

=== Medal winners ===
| Event | Gold | Silver | Bronze |
|---|---|---|---|
Senior
| All-around | Leah Smith | Alex Theodorou | Lilly Hudson |
Junior
| All-around | Alicia Zhou | Avery Neff | Gabriella Van Frayen |

=== Notable competitors ===
Senior competitor, Lexi Zeiss, would go on to win a gold medal at the 2022 World Championships as part of team USA.
