= Joscelyn Roberson =

American artistic gymnast

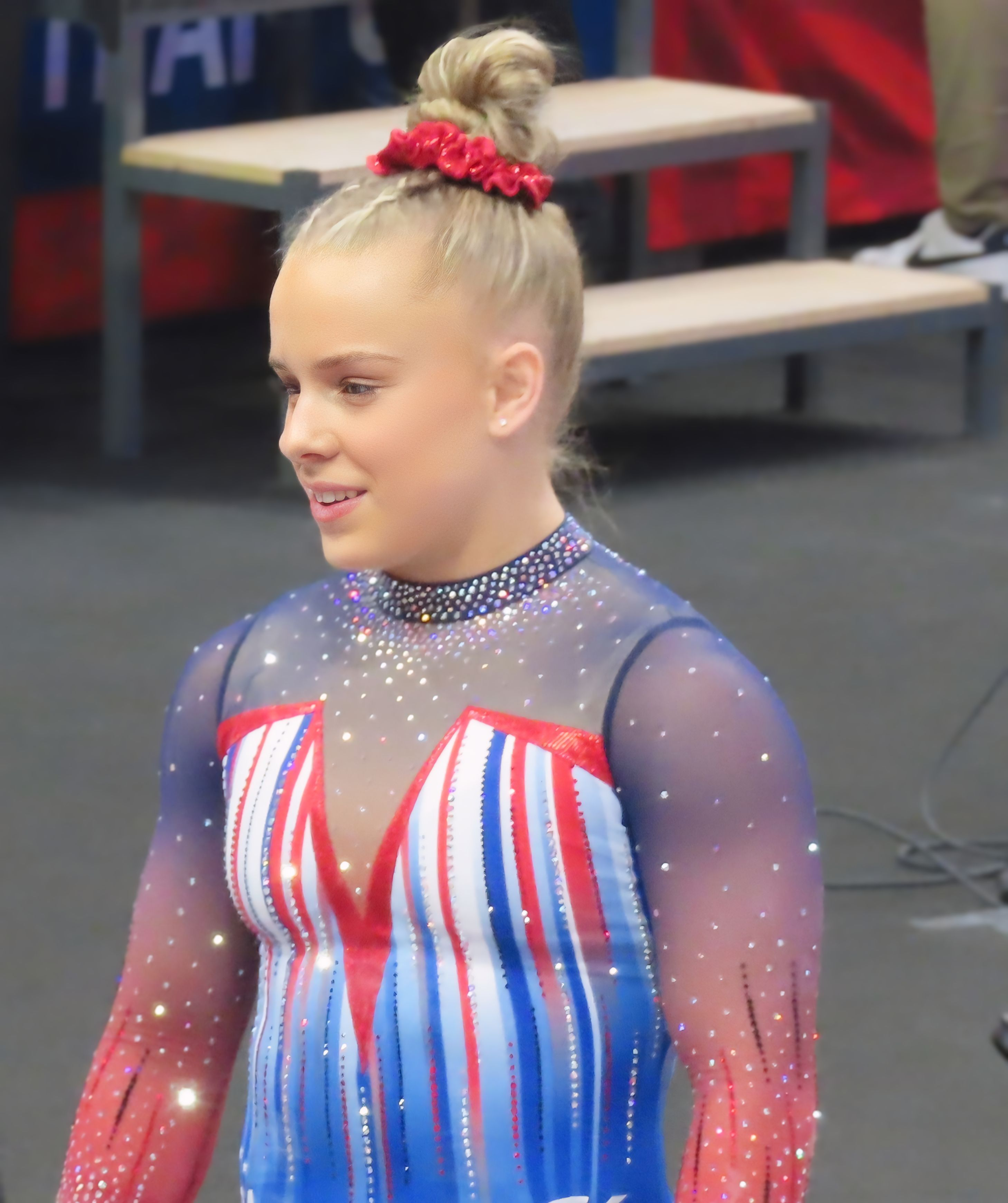
- Roberson at the 2024 Olympic Trials

Personal information
- Full name: Joscelyn Michelle Roberson
- Nickname: Josc
- Born: February 8, 2006 (age 20) Texarkana, Texas, U.S.
- Height: 4 ft 8 in (142 cm)

Gymnastics career
- Discipline: Women's artistic gymnastics
- Country represented: United States; (2021, 2023–2026)
- College team: Arkansas Razorbacks (2025–2026); Georgia Bulldogs (2027–2028)
- Club: World Champions Centre
- Head coach: Cécile Canqueteau-Landi
- Assistant coach: Laurent Landi
- Former coaches: Jordyn Wieber; Chris Brooks; Kyla Ross
Medal record
Representing the United States
World Championships
Gold medal – first place	2023 Antwerp	Team
Bronze medal – third place	2025 Jakarta	Vault
Pan American Championships
Gold medal – first place	2023 Medellín	Team
Gold medal – first place	2023 Medellín	Floor exercise
Silver medal – second place	2023 Medellín	Vault
Silver medal – second place	2023 Medellín	Balance beam
FIG World Cup Series
Event	1st	2nd	3rd
Apparatus World Cup	2	1	0
Total	2	1	0

Joscelyn Michelle Roberson (born February 8, 2006) is an American artistic gymnast. She was a member of the gold medal winning team at the 2023 World Championships and was named an alternate for Team USA at the 2024 Summer Olympics. She is the 2025 World bronze medalist on vault.

== Early life ==
Roberson was born to Jeffrey and Ashley Roberson in 2006 in Texarkana, Texas.

== Gymnastics career ==
=== 2021 ===
Roberson competed at the 2021 Winter Cup where she placed second behind Ella Kate Parker in the all-around, first on balance beam, and third on floor exercise in the junior division. She next competed at the U.S. Classic where she placed fifth. At the National Championships Roberson placed fourth in the all-around, first on balance beam, and second on vault. As a result, she was named as the alternate to the team for the Junior Pan American Championships.

=== 2022 ===
Roberson became age-eligible for senior competition in 2022. She made her senior debut at the 2022 Winter Cup where she placed first on vault. She next competed at the U.S. Classic and the National Championships. In October Roberson verbally committed to compete for the Arkansas Razorbacks, starting in the 2024–25 season.

=== 2023 ===
Roberson began the year competing at the 2023 Winter Cup where she placed first on vault and second on balance beam and floor exercise. A sub-par uneven bars performance resulted in a sixth place all-around finish. As a result, Roberson was added to the senior national team for the first time and was selected to compete at the DTB Pokal Team Challenge alongside Lexi Zeiss, Zoe Miller, Nola Matthews, and Ashlee Sullivan. Together they finished first as a team and Roberson qualified to the vault and floor exercise event finals. She won gold on vault and silver on floor exercise behind Júlia Soares of Brazil. Due to her performance in Stuttgart, Roberson was selected to compete at the Cairo World Cup in April where she won gold on vault and floor as well as a silver on balance beam.

Following the Cairo World Cup, Roberson was named to the team to compete at the Pan American Championships alongside Zoe Miller, Addison Fatta, Tiana Sumanasekera, Nola Matthews, and traveling replacement athlete Madray Johnson. During the Pan American Championships she won gold on floor and silver on balance beam and vault. During the team final Roberson contributed on vault, balance beam, and floor exercise towards the USA's first place finish.

In September, Roberson was selected to represent the United States at the 2023 World Championships alongside Simone Biles, Skye Blakely, Shilese Jones, Leanne Wong, and alternate Kayla DiCello. During qualifications, she competed on vault and floor exercise to help the USA qualify to the team final in first place, and individually, she qualified to the vault final. She was expected to once again compete on vault and floor exercise during the team final; however, while warming up on vault she injured her ankle and was unable to compete. Despite this, the USA still won their seventh consecutive World team title. Due to the injury, Roberson withdrew from the vault final.

In November, Roberson signed her National Letter of Intent with the Arkansas Razorbacks.

=== 2024 ===
Roberson made her return to competition at the American Classic, but she only competed on uneven bars and balance beam. She made her return to the all-around at the Core Hydration Classic where she finished twelfth. At the National Championships Roberson placed tenth in the all-around and fourth on floor exercise. As a result she qualified to the Olympic Trials.

At the Olympic trials, she placed sixth in the all-around, fourth on vault, tenth on uneven bars, first on balance beam, and fourth on floor, and was named an alternate for Team USA at the 2024 Summer Olympics.

=== 2025 ===
Roberson returned to elite competition after her freshman season competing with the Arkansas Razorbacks. She first competed at the U.S. Classic where she won bronze in the all-around behind Claire Pease and Simone Rose. At the U.S. National Championships she once again placed third, this time behind Hezly Rivera and Leanne Wong, and won silver on floor exercise behind Rivera. In early October Roberson was selected to represent the United States at the 2025 World Championships taking place later that month alongside Skye Blakely, Dulcy Caylor, and Wong.

At the World Championships Roberson only competed on vault and floor exercise, qualifying to the vault final in eighth place. During the event final she won the bronze medal behind Angelina Melnikova and Lia Monica Fontaine.

== Collegiate gymnastics career ==
=== 2024–2025 season ===
Roberson made her collegiate debut on January 11, 2025 in a quad meet against UCLA, Kentucky, and Ohio State. She competed on all four apparatuses and co-won the all-around title alongside Tory Vetter of Ohio State. In their first duel meet with an SEC opponent, Auburn, Roberson collected two more event titles on beam and floor, scoring a new career high of 9.925 on beam. In a tri-meet with Denver and Texas Woman's University, Auburn scored their first win of the season with dominant help from Roberson as she won her second all-around title with a score of 39.350 while also winning on beam.

Roberson won her third all-around title helping Arkansas defeat reigning national champions and no. 02 ranked LSU. Traveling to Oklahoma, Roberson repeated a career high of 9.925 on beam, tying for second with Oklahoma's Faith Torrez. In a return to Bud Walton Arena, the Razorbacks defeated the no. 02 Florida Gators where Roberson placed second in the all-around and collected a 9.900 on beam to win the title, her second of the season.

On Valentine's Day at Georgia, Arkansas suffered a close loss. She secured her first collegiate vault title with a career high 9.900 closing out the rotation. At the Metroplex Challenge, Arkansas won defeating no. 19 Arizona, no. 10 Oregon State, and Southeast Missouri State. Roberson placed second in the all-around, behind her U.S. teammate, Jade Carey. She continued her dominant performance placing second on beam and tied for second on floor.

Despite not competing in the all-around against no.16 Alabama, Roberson dominated on both beam and floor winning both events with scores of 9.925+. Her 9.975 on floor helped Arkansas set a new high of 49.650. In an away meet at Kentucky, she scored an Arkansas rookie all-round high score of 39.525. In their final regular season meet against Missouri, Roberson repeated her high on all-around and took a share of the floor title with a 9.925.

=== 2025–2026 season ===
Roberson announced on April 27, 2026 that she was entering the transfer portal. She took official visits at Florida, UCLA, and Georgia before ultimately deciding to transfer to the University of Georgia and reuniting with her former coaches from World Champions Centre, Cécile Canqueteau-Landi and Laurent Landi, who were now the head coach and associate head coach at Georgia.

=== Regular season ranking ===
Season	All-around	Vault	Uneven bars	Balance beam	Floor exercise
2025	25th	48th	159th	15th	22nd
2026	N/A	N/A	95th	5th	35th

== Competitive history ==
Competitive history of Joscelyn Roberson at the junior level
Year	Event	Team	AA	VT	UB	BB	FX
2019	American Classic		20	15	22	9	15
2019	U.S. Classic		30	25	34	33	17
2021	Winter Cup		2nd place, silver medalist(s)	8	10	1st place, gold medalist(s)	3rd place, bronze medalist(s)
2021	U.S. Classic		5	2nd place, silver medalist(s)	15	5	3rd place, bronze medalist(s)
2021	U.S. National Championships		4	2nd place, silver medalist(s)	12	1st place, gold medalist(s)	4

Competitive history of Joscelyn Roberson at the senior level
Year	Event	Team	AA	VT	UB	BB	FX
2022	Winter Cup		21	1st place, gold medalist(s)	24	5	11
2022	U.S. Classic		7	2nd place, silver medalist(s)	13	6	4
2022	U.S. National Championships		18	2nd place, silver medalist(s)	21	14	11
2023	Winter Cup		6	1st place, gold medalist(s)	29	2nd place, silver medalist(s)	2nd place, silver medalist(s)
2023	DTB Pokal Team Challenge	1st place, gold medalist(s)		1st place, gold medalist(s)			2nd place, silver medalist(s)
2023	Cairo World Cup			1st place, gold medalist(s)		2nd place, silver medalist(s)	1st place, gold medalist(s)
2023	Pan American Championships	1st place, gold medalist(s)		2nd place, silver medalist(s)		2nd place, silver medalist(s)	1st place, gold medalist(s)
2023	U.S. Classic		3rd place, bronze medalist(s)	1st place, gold medalist(s)	29	3rd place, bronze medalist(s)	2nd place, silver medalist(s)
2023	U.S. National Championships		7	1st place, gold medalist(s)	25	7	7
2023	World Championships	1st place, gold medalist(s)		WD			
2024	American Classic				12	16	
2024	U.S. Classic		12	4	16	11	29
2024	U.S. National Championships		10	6	16	11	4
2024	Olympic Trials		6	4	10	1st place, gold medalist(s)	4
2025	U.S. Classic		3rd place, bronze medalist(s)		6	4	11
2025	U.S. National Championships		3rd place, bronze medalist(s)		5	7	2nd place, silver medalist(s)
2025	World Championships	—N/a		3rd place, bronze medalist(s)			

Competitive history of Joscelyn Roberson at the NCAA level
Year	Event	Team	AA	VT	UB	BB	FX
2025	NCAA Championships		13	31	47	13	15
2026	SEC Championships	9	6			2nd place, silver medalist(s)	
2026	NCAA Championships	7			48	17	13
