= Lexi Zeiss =

American artistic gymnast (born 2005)

- Full name: Lexi Kay Zeiss
- Born: November 4, 2005 (age 20) Omaha, Nebraska USA

Gymnastics career
- Discipline: Women's artistic gymnastics
- Country represented: United States (2022–2023)
- College team: LSU Tigers (2025–28)
- Club: Twin City Twisters
- Head coach: Sarah Jantzi
- Assistant coach: Steve Hafeman
Medal record
Women's artistic gymnastics
Representing the United States
World Championships
Gold medal – first place	2022 Liverpool	Team
Pan American Championships
Silver medal – second place	2022 Rio de Janeiro	Team
Silver medal – second place	2022 Rio de Janeiro	All-around
Bronze medal – third place	2022 Rio de Janeiro	Balance beam
Representing Louisiana State Tigers
NCAA Championships
Silver medal – second place	2026 Fort Worth	Team

Lexi Kay Zeiss (born November 4, 2005) is an American artistic gymnast and a former member of the United States national gymnastics team. She was part of the silver medal winning team at the 2022 Pan American Championships and was the alternate for the gold medal winning team at the 2022 World Championships.

== Early life ==
Zeiss was born in Omaha, Nebraska in 2005 to Jess and Dana Zeiss.

== Gymnastics career ==
=== 2021 ===
Zeiss made her elite gymnastics debut at the 2021 Winter Cup where she placed eleventh in the all-around. She next competed at the American Classic where she placed sixteenth. Zeiss competed at the U.S. Classic where she finished sixteenth in the all-around.

=== 2022 ===
Zeiss competed at the 2022 Winter Cup where she finished fifteenth in the all-around.

In July Zeiss was selected to compete at the Pan American Championships alongside Skye Blakely, Kayla DiCello, Zoe Miller, and Elle Mueller. On the first day of competition Zeiss finished second in the all-around behind Flávia Saraiva of Brazil and third on balance beam behind Saraiva and Rebeca Andrade. During the team final Zeiss competed on vault, balance beam, and floor exercise, helping the United States win silver behind Brazil. At the end of the competition Zeiss was awarded the Sportsmanship Award for Excellence, Respect, and Friendship by the Pan American Gymnastics Union alongside Caio Souza.

In August Zeiss competed at her first National Championships. She finished seventh in the all-around and was named to the national team for the second time.

In October Zeiss announced her verbal commit to compete for the LSU Tigers gymnastics team. Later that month she was selected as the traveling alternate for the 2022 World Championships team. During the team final Zeiss was on the competition floor supporting the team as they won their sixth consecutive team gold medal.

=== 2023 ===
Zeiss competed at the 2023 Winter Cup where she won the all-around competition. As a result she was named to the team to compete at the DTB Pokal Team Challenge in Stuttgart alongside Nola Matthews, Zoe Miller, Joscelyn Roberson, and Ashlee Sullivan.

In November Zeiss signed her National Letter of Intent with the LSU Tigers.

=== Collegiate gymnastics career ===
==== NCAA Regular season ranking ====
Season	All-Around	Vault	Uneven Bars	Balance Beam	Floor Exercise
2025	N/A	112	67	N/A	N/A
2026	N/A	43	64	102	N/A

== Competitive history ==
Competitive history of Lexi Zeiss at the elite level
Year	Event	Team	AA	VT	UB	BB	FX
2021	Winter Cup		11	8	14	11	16
2021	American Classic		16				
2021	U.S. Classic		18		22	35	14
2022	Winter Cup		15		19	21	6
2022	Pan American Championships	2nd place, silver medalist(s)	2nd place, silver medalist(s)			3rd place, bronze medalist(s)	
2022	U.S. National Championships		7		6	13	9
2022	World Championships	(gold) (Note: Zeiss was the team USA alternate)					
2023	Winter Cup		1st place, gold medalist(s)		4	4	6
2023	DTB Pokal Team Challenge	1st place, gold medalist(s)					
2023	U.S. Classic				10		
2023	U.S. National Championships				6		
2024	Winter Cup				25		
2024	U.S. Classic		18		13	19	28
2024	U.S. National Championships		28		11	30	33

Competitive history of Lexi Zeiss at the NCAA level
Year	Event	Team	AA	VT	UB	BB	FX
2025	SEC Championships	1st place, gold medalist(s)		6	22		
2025	NCAA Championships	5		40	18		
2026	SEC Championships	3rd place, bronze medalist(s)					
2026	NCAA Championships	2nd place, silver medalist(s)		21	30	52	
