= 2023 U.S. National Gymnastics Championships =

- Venue: SAP Center
- Location: San Jose, California, U.S.
- Date: August 24, 2023–August 27, 2023

The 2023 U.S. National Gymnastics Championships, known as the 2023 Xfinity U.S. Gymnastics Championships, was the 59th edition of the U.S. National Gymnastics Championships. The competition was held at the SAP Center in San Jose, California from August 24–27, 2023.

== Competition schedule ==
The competition featured Senior and Junior contests for both women's and men's disciplines. The competition schedule was as follows (in Pacific time):

- Thursday, August 24: Men's gymnastics – juniors at 11:30 a.m. and seniors at 5:00 p.m.
- Friday, August 25: Women's gymnastics – juniors at 12:00 p.m. and seniors at 5:00 p.m.
- Saturday, August 26: Men's gymnastics – juniors at 10:30 a.m. and seniors at 4:00 p.m.
- Sunday, August 27: Women's gymnastics – juniors at 11:00 a.m. and seniors at 4:00 p.m.

The event was broadcast on NBC Sports.

== Sponsorship ==
In August, Xfinity was announced as the title sponsor for the event.

== Medalists ==
Event	Gold	Silver	Bronze
Senior Women
Individual all-around	Simone Biles	Shilese Jones	Leanne Wong
Vault	Joscelyn Roberson	Skye Blakely	Jade Carey
Uneven bars	Shilese Jones	Skye Blakely	Simone Biles
Balance beam	Simone Biles	Skye Blakely	Sunisa Lee
Floor	Simone Biles	Kaliya Lincoln	Shilese Jones
Junior Women
Individual all-around	Hezly Rivera	Kieryn Finnell	Izzy Stassi
Vault	Izzy Stassi	Tatum Drusch	Simone Rose
Uneven bars	Hezly Rivera	Gabrielle Hardie	Kieryn Finnell
Balance beam	Hezly Rivera	Kieryn Finnell	Lacie Saltzmann
Floor	Reese Esponda	Gabrielle Hardie	Sage Bradford
Senior Men
Individual all-around	Asher Hong	Khoi Young	Fred Richard
Floor	Paul Juda	Taylor Burkhart	Donnell Whittenburg
Pommel horse	Stephen Nedoroscik	Khoi Young	Yul Moldauer
Rings	Donnell Whittenburg	Asher Hong	Alex Diab
Vault	Kameron Nelson	—N/a	
Parallel bars	Yul Moldauer	Curran Phillips	Blake Sun
Horizontal bar	Fred Richard	Crew Bold	Brandon Briones
Junior Men (17-18)
Individual all-around	Kai Uemera	Kiran Mandava	Xander Hong
Junior Men (15-16)
Individual all-around	Nathan Roman	Danila Leykin	Ty Roderiques

== Women's national team ==
Following the competition the top ten senior women in the all-around were named to the senior national team: Simone Biles, Shilese Jones, Leanne Wong, Skye Blakely, Jordan Chiles, Katelyn Jong, Joscelyn Roberson, Kayla DiCello, Tiana Sumanasekera, and Amelia Disidore. The top six junior athletes were named to the junior national team: Hezly Rivera, Kieryn Finnell, Izzy Stassi, Zoha Rasul, Gabby Hardie, and Reese Esponda.

== Men's national team ==
After the competition the following male athletes were named to the senior national team: Cameron Bock, Jeremy Bischoff, Brandon Briones, Taylor Burkhart, Alex Diab, Dallas Hale, Asher Hong, Paul Juda, Riley Loos, Brody Malone, Yul Moldauer, Stephen Nedoroscik, Vahe Petrosyan, Curran Phillips, Fred Richard, Colt Walker, Donnell Whittenburg, Shane Wiskus, and Khoi Young. The two athletes named to the senior development team were Landen Blixt and Joshua Karnes.

Additionally, the teams for the upcoming World Championships and Pan American Games were named. Hong, Young, Moldauer, Richard, and Juda were named to the World Championships team with Walker serving as the traveling alternate. Walker, Wiskus, Whittenburg, Nedoroscik, and Bock were named to the Pan American Games team with Loos and Phillips serving as the non-traveling alternates. Petrosyan had earned himself an individual berth to compete at the Pan American Games as an individual when we won the 2021 Junior Pan American Games.

== Participants ==
The following athletes qualified to compete at this event:

=== Women ===
==== Senior ====
- Simone Biles (World Champions Centre)
- Skye Blakely (WOGA Gymnastics)
- Charlotte Booth (Brandy Johnson's Global Gymnastics)
- Jade Carey (Oregon State University)
- Dulcy Caylor (World Champions Centre)
- Jordan Chiles (World Champions Centre)
- Kayla DiCello (Hill's Gymnastics)
- Amelia Disidore (Great American Gymnastics Express)
- Addison Fatta (Prestige Gymnastics)
- Madray Johnson (WOGA Gymnastics)
- Shilese Jones (Ascend Gymnastics Center)
- Katelyn Jong (Metroplex Gymnastics)
- Levi Jung-Ruivivar (WOGA Gymnastics)
- Sunisa Lee (Midwest Gymnastics Center)
- Myli Lew (San Mateo Gymnastic)
- Kaliya Lincoln (WOGA Gymnastics)
- Evelynn Lowe (Great American Gymnastics Express)
- Nola Matthews (Airborne Gymnastics Training Center)
- Zoe Miller (World Champions Centre)
- Elle Mueller (Twin City Twisters)
- Marissa Neal (Great American Gymnastics Express)
- Michelle Pineda (Metroplex Gymnastics)
- Joscelyn Roberson (World Champions Centre)
- Ashlee Sullivan (WOGA Gymnastics)
- Tiana Sumanasekera (World Champions Centre)
- Leanne Wong (University of Florida Gymnastics)
- Kelise Woolford (Buckeye Gymnastics)
- Lexi Zeiss (Twin City Twisters)
- Alicia Zhou (Love Gymnastics)

==== Junior ====
- Isabella Anzola (Georgia Elite Gymnastics)
- Sage Bradford (WOGA Gymnastics)
- Ly Bui (Great American Gymnastics Express)
- Charleigh Bullock (Capital Gymnastics)
- Lavi Crain (Great American Gymnastics Express)
- Ally Damelio (San Mateo Gymnastics)
- Nicole Desmond (Parkettes National Gymnastics Center)
- Tatum Drusch (Flips Gymnastics)
- Reese Esponda (Roots Gymnastics)
- Kieryn Finnell (RGA)
- Addy Fulcher (Bull City Gymnastics)
- Jayla Hang (Pacific Reign Gymnastics)
- Gabrielle Hardie (Twin City Twisters)
- Zoey Molomo (Metroplex Gymnastics)
- Ella Kate Parker (Cincinnati Gymnastics)
- Claire Pease (WOGA Gymnastics)
- Hezly Rivera (WOGA Gymnastics)
- Simone Rose (Pacific Reign Gymnastics)
- Lacie Saltzman (Texas Dreams Gymnastics)
- Audrey Snyder (First State Gymnastics)
- Izzy Stassi (Buckeye Gymnastics)
- Maliha Tressel (Twin City Twisters)
- Tyler Turner (Airborne Gymnastics Training Center)
- Camie Westerman (Hill's Gymnastics)

=== Men ===
==== Senior ====
- Javier Alfonso (University of Michigan)
- Michael Artlip (Penn State University)
- Fuzzy Benas (University of Oklahoma)
- Maxim Bereznev (University of Oklahoma)
- Jeremy Bischoff (Stanford University)
- Landen Blixt (University of Michigan)
- Cameron Bock (University of Michigan)
- Crew Bold (University of Michigan)
- Brandon Briones (Stanford University)
- Taylor Burkhart (Stanford University)
- J.R. Chou (Stanford University)
- Taylor Christopulos (University of Nebraska)
- Caden Clinton (Cypress Academy)
- Matthew Cormier (Penn State University)
- Chase Davenport-Mills (Ohio State University)
- Alex Diab (EVO Gymnastics)
- Isaiah Drake (U.S. Naval Academy)
- Michael Fletcher (University of Illinois)
- Ian Gunther (Stanford University)
- Dallas Hale (Cypress Academy of Gymnastics)
- Jackson Harrison (Arizona State)
- Asher Hong (Stanford University)
- Patrick Hoopes (U.S. Air Force Academy)
- Michael Jaroh (Penn State University)
- Paul Juda (University of Michigan)
- Alex Karadzhov (EVO Gymnastics)
- Joshua Karnes (Penn State University)
- Riley Loos (Stanford University)
- Evan Manivong (University of Illinois)
- Connor McCool (University of Illinois)
- Yul Moldauer (5280 Gymnastics)
- Stephen Nedoroscik (EVO Gymnastics)
- Kameron Nelson (Ohio State University)
- Brandon Nguyen (Stanford University)
- Zachary Nunez (University of Oklahoma)
- Vahe Petrosyan (Gymnastics Olympica USA)
- Curran Phillips (EVO Gymnastics)
- Fred Richard (University of Michigan)
- Ian Sandoval (EVO Gymnastics)
- Tyler Shimizu (UC Berkeley)
- Landon Simpson (Penn State University)
- Ian Skirkey (University of Illinois)
- Blake Sun (Stanford University)
- Alex Tapanes (Nova Gymnastics)
- Colt Walker (Stanford University)
- Donnell Whittenburg (Salto Gymnastics Center)
- Shane Wiskus (EVO Gymnastics)
- Khoi Young (Stanford University)
- Oliver Zavel (U.S. Air Force Academy)
