= 2023 DTB Pokal Stuttgart =

Artistic gymnastics competition

- Venue: Porsche-Arena
- Location: Stuttgart, Germany
- Dates: March 17–19, 2023
- Nations: 18
- Teams: 45

The 2023 EnBW DTB Pokal Team Challenge and Mixed Cup was an artistic gymnastics competition held from March 17–19, 2023 at the Porsche-Arena in Stuttgart, Germany. The event consisted of five separate competitions across three days: a team challenge competition for both senior men and women; a team challenge for junior men and women; and a mixed team cup which will was contested between mixed gender senior teams from Brazil, Germany, Japan and the United States.

== Schedule ==
Date	Session	Time
Friday, March 17	Junior Team Challenge Men	10:00–13:15
Friday, March 17	Team Challenge Men	16:00–19:45
Saturday, March 18	Junior Team Challenge Women	10:00–12:30
Saturday, March 18	Team Challenge Women	14:30–17:30
Saturday, March 18	Men's Apparatus Finals – Seniors & Juniors	18:30–21:45
Sunday, March 19	Women's Apparatus Finals – Seniors & Juniors	10:00–12:15
Sunday, March 19	Mixed Cup	14:30–17:15

== Medalists ==
=== Senior ===
Event	Gold	Silver	Bronze
Team Challenge
Men
Team	United States; Asher Hong; Brody Malone; Yul Moldauer; Fred Richard; Shane Wiskus	Japan; Ryosuke Doi; Tsuyoshi Hasegawa; Daiki Hashimoto; Kakeru Tanigawa	Turkey; Adem Asil; Ferhat Arıcan; İbrahim Çolak; Mehmet Koşak; Kerem Şener
Floor Exercise	(Japan) Ryosuke Doi	(United States) Yul Moldauer	(Spain) Pau Jimenez
Pommel Horse	(Italy) Edoardo de Rosa	(Japan) Kakeru Tanigawa	(United States) Asher Hong
Rings	(Turkey) Adem Asil	(Italy) Marco Lodadio	(Canada) Félix Dolci
Vault	(United Kingdom) Harry Hepworth	(Brazil) Yuri Guimarães	(Turkey) Adem Asil
Parallel Bars	(Italy) Mario Macchiati	(Switzerland) Taha Serhani	(Turkey) Ferhat Arıcan
Horizontal Bar	(Japan) Daiki Hashimoto	(Switzerland) Taha Serhani	(Canada) Félix Dolci
Women
Team	United States; Nola Matthews; Zoe Miller; Joscelyn Roberson; Ashlee Sullivan; Lexi Zeiss	Belgium; Maellyse Brassart; Fien Enghels; Aberdeen O'Driscol; Erika Pinxten; Jutta Verkest	France; Léa Franceries; Silane Mielle; Djenna Laroui; Morgane Osyssek; Sheyen Petit
Vault	(United States) Joscelyn Roberson	(Germany) Karina Schönmaier	—N/a
Uneven Bars	(United States) Zoe Miller	(Netherlands) Sanna Veerman	(Belgium) Fien Enghels
Balance Beam	(Germany) Jessica Schlegel	(Belgium) Maellyse Brassart	(France) Léa Franceries
Floor Exercise	(Brazil) Júlia Soares	(United States) Joscelyn Roberson	(Canada) Aurelie Tran
Mixed Cup
Team	Japan; Hazuki Watanabe; Chiharu Yamada; Nanami Yamamoto; Ryosuke Doi; Tsuyoshi Hasegawa; Daiki Hashimoto	Germany; Anna-Lena König; Elisabeth Seitz; Sarah Voss; Pascal Brendel; Milan Hosseini; Andreas Toba	Brazil; Luisa Maia; Carolyne Pedro; Josiany Calixto; Tomás Florêncio; Yuri Guimarães; Josué Heliodoro

=== Junior ===
Event	Gold	Silver	Bronze
Men
Team	United States; Zach Green; Danila Leykin; Alex Nitache; Max Odden; Sollen Chiodi	Germany; Timo Eder; Marcel Graf; Alexander Kirchner; Maxim Kovalenko; Daniel Mousichidis	Turkey; Alperen Ege Avci; Ahmet Burak Ekici; Volkan Arda Hamarat
Floor Exercise	(Spain) Eric Terres Martin	(Germany) Timo Eder	(United States) Solen Chiodi
Pommel Horse	(Finland) Marcus Pietarinen	(Germany) Daniel Mousichidis	(Netherlands) Gijs Franken
Rings	(Turkey) Volkan Arda Hamarat	(Finland) Aaro Harju	(Belgium) Romeo Jost
Vault	(Germany) Maxim Kovalenko	(United States) Solen Chiodi	(Australia) Nicholas Howard
Parallel Bars	(United States) Danila Leykin	(Turkey) Volkan Arda Hamarat	(Belgium) Kyano Schepers
Horizontal Bar	(United States) Zach Green	(Germany) Timo Eder	(Turkey) Volkan Arda Hamarat
Women
Team	Germany; Mara Dietz; Marlene Gotthardt; Helen Kevric; Silja Stöhr; Lisa Woetzel	Canada; Gabrielle Black; Aaliyah DeSousa; Gabrielle Fausto; Lia Monica Fontaine; Reese Wilson	Belgium; Chloe Baert; Hanne Degryse; Naomi Descamps; Marie DeSmet; Yelena Devreker
Vault	(France) Ming van Eijken	(Canada) Lia Monica Fontaine	(Romania) Alexandra Florea
Uneven Bars	(France) Lilou Viallat	(Spain) Leire Escauriaza Tipacti	(Canada) Gabrielle Black
Balance Beam	(Belgium) Naomi Descamps	(Germany) Marlene Gotthardt	(France) Lana Pondart
Floor Exercise	(Canada) Gabrielle Fausto	(Romania) Anamaria Mihaescu	(Germany) Lisa Woetzel

== Mixed Cup results ==
=== Qualification ===
Rank	Name	Round 1	Round 2	Round 3	Total
1	Japan				161.081
1	Hazuki Watanabe	13.766	–	13.233	161.081
1	Chiharu Yamada	–	12.700	–	161.081
1	Nanami Yamamoto	11.700	12.466	12.166	161.081
1	Ryosuke Doi	14.800	13.500	–	161.081
1	Tsuyoshi Hasegawa	14.250	14.650	13.500	161.081
1	Daiki Hashimoto	–	–	14.300	161.081
2	Germany				159.030
2	Anna-Lena König	–	–	12.966	159.030
2	Sarah Voss	13.566	12.833	12.666	159.030
2	Elisabeth Seitz	13.466	14.633	–	159.030
2	Andreas Toba	13.000	12.100	–	159.030
2	Milan Hosseini	13.750	–	13.550	159.030
2	Pascal Brendel	–	13.200	13.300	159.030
3	United States				157.330
3	Elle Mueller	14.033	11.466	13.266	157.330
3	Nola Matthews	12.366	13.066	–	157.330
3	Addison Fatta	–	–	12.833	157.330
3	Landen Blixt	13.050	13.200	11.750	157.330
3	Isaiah Drake	14.300	–	–	157.330
3	Jeremy Bischoff	–	14.550	13.450	157.330
4	Brazil				147.781
4	Luisa Maia	–	11.466	–	147.781
4	Carolyne Pedro	12.633	–	12.233	147.781
4	Josiany Calixto	11.433	12.266	8.700	147.781
4	Tomás Florêncio	–	13.200	13.650	147.781
4	Yuri Guimarães	13.200	13.650	13.500	147.781
4	Josué Heliodoro	11.850	–	–	147.781

=== Final ===
Rank	Name	Round 4	Total
Gold final
1st place, gold medalist(s)	Japan		55.833
1st place, gold medalist(s)	Hazuki Watanabe	12.833	55.833
1st place, gold medalist(s)	Chiharu Yamada	13.500	55.833
1st place, gold medalist(s)	Nanami Yamamoto	–	55.833
1st place, gold medalist(s)	Ryosuke Doi	14.600	55.833
1st place, gold medalist(s)	Tsuyoshi Hasegawa	–	55.833
1st place, gold medalist(s)	Daiki Hashimoto	14.900	55.833
2nd place, silver medalist(s)	Germany		52.583
2nd place, silver medalist(s)	Anna-Lena König	–	52.583
2nd place, silver medalist(s)	Sarah Voss	13.233	52.583
2nd place, silver medalist(s)	Elisabeth Seitz	12.500	52.583
2nd place, silver medalist(s)	Andreas Toba	13.350	52.583
2nd place, silver medalist(s)	Milan Hosseini	–	52.583
2nd place, silver medalist(s)	Pascal Brendel	13.500	52.583
Bronze final
3rd place, bronze medalist(s)	Brazil		54.632
3rd place, bronze medalist(s)	Luisa Maia	13.166	54.632
3rd place, bronze medalist(s)	Carolyne Pedro	13.066	54.632
3rd place, bronze medalist(s)	Josiany Calixto	–	54.632
3rd place, bronze medalist(s)	Tomás Florêncio	–	54.632
3rd place, bronze medalist(s)	Yuri Guimarães	14.100	54.632
3rd place, bronze medalist(s)	Josué Heliodoro	14.250	54.632
4	United States		54.466
4	Elle Mueller	13.666	54.466
4	Nola Matthews	–	54.466
4	Addison Fatta	13.900	54.466
4	Landen Blixt	13.050	54.466
4	Isaiah Drake	–	54.466
4	Jeremy Bischoff	13.850	54.466

== Participants ==
Participating nations and event distribution per nation
Country	Women Senior Team Challenge	Men Senior Team Challenge	Women Junior Team Challenge	Men Junior Team Challenge	Mixed Cup
Australia	Yes	Yes	No	Yes	No
Belgium	Yes	No	Yes	Yes	No
Brazil	Yes	Yes	No	No	Yes
Canada	Yes	Yes	Yes	Yes	No
Finland	No	No	No	Yes	No
France	Yes	Yes	Yes	No	No
Germany	Yes	Yes	Yes	Yes	Yes
(United Kingdom) Great Britain	No	Yes	No	No	No
Israel	No	Yes	Yes	Yes	No
Italy	Yes	Yes	Yes	No	No
Japan	Yes	Yes	No	No	Yes
Netherlands	Yes	No	Yes	Yes	No
Romania	No	No	Yes	No	No
Spain	No	Yes	No	Yes	No
Switzerland	No	Yes	No	No	No
Sweden	No	No	No	Yes	No
Turkey	No	Yes	No	Yes	No
United States	Yes	Yes	No	Yes	Yes
Total	9	13	8	11	4

Notes on participating nations: Austria were listed on promotional materials but not on any start lists.
