= Zoe Miller (gymnast) =

American artistic gymnast (born 2005)

- Full name: Zoe Eliana Miller
- Nickname: Zo Zo
- Born: November 11, 2005 (age 20) Hartford, Connecticut, U.S.

Gymnastics career
- Discipline: Women's artistic gymnastics
- Country represented: United States; (2021–2024)
- College team: LSU Tigers (2025–present)
- Club: World Champions Centre
- Head coach: Laurent Landi
- Assistant coach: Cecile Landi
Medal record
Representing the United States
Pan American Games
Gold medal – first place	2023 Santiago	Team
Gold medal – first place	2023 Santiago	Uneven bars
Pan American Championships
Gold medal – first place	2023 Medellín	Team
Silver medal – second place	2022 Rio de Janeiro	Team
Silver medal – second place	2022 Rio de Janeiro	Uneven bars

Zoe Eliana Miller (born November 11, 2005) is an American artistic gymnast and a former member of the United States women's national gymnastics team. At the 2023 Pan American Games, she won gold medals on the uneven bars and in the team event. She was a member of the team who won gold at the 2023 Pan American Championships and silver at the 2022 Pan American Championships.

== Early life ==
Miller was born in Hartford, Connecticut, to Clara and Moulton Miller and has 2 brothers and 3 sisters.

== Gymnastics career ==
=== 2019 ===
In June, Miller competed at the American Classic in the junior division, where she placed fifth in the all-around and on balance beam and placed sixth on the uneven bars. She next competed in the 2019 U.S. Classic, placing sixth on the uneven bars and twelfth in the all-around. Miller qualified for the 2019 National Championships, where she placed fourteenth in the all-around and was not named to the national team.

=== 2021 ===
Miller became age-eligible for senior level competition in 2021. In February, she competed at the 2021 Winter Cup where she placed fifth on uneven bars, seventh on floor exercise, and eighth in the all-around. She next competed at the 2021 U.S. Classic where she placed fourth on the uneven bars and fourteenth in the all-around. The following month Miller competed at the 2021 National Championships. She placed sixth on the uneven bars and seventeenth in the all-around. As a result, she was named to the National Team for the first time. Later that month she competed at the U.S Olympic Trials, ultimately placing twelfth.

=== 2022 ===
In February, Miller competed in the Winter cup placing eighth on uneven bars and fourteenth in the all-around. In her international debut, she competed at the City of Jesolo Trophy, helping the US win gold and individually placing seventh in the all-around. In July, she was selected to compete at the upcoming Pan American Championships alongside Kayla DiCello, Skye Blakely, Elle Mueller, and Lexi Zeiss. On the first day of competition she won silver on uneven bars behind Rebeca Andrade. During the team final Miller competed only on uneven bars, earning the highest score on the apparatus and helping the United States win silver behind Brazil.

=== 2023 ===
Miller was named to the team to compete at the Pan American Championships alongside Joscelyn Roberson, Addison Fatta, Tiana Sumanasekera, Nola Matthews and traveling replacement athlete Madray Johnson. On May 25, it was announced that Miller suffered a concussion during training and entered the concussion protocol; as a result Johnson replaced her.

In September, Miller was named to the team to compete at the 2023 Pan American Games alongside Jordan Chiles, Kayla DiCello, Kaliya Lincoln, and Sumanasekera. They won gold as a team and individually Miller won gold on the uneven bars.

On November 8, 2023, Miller signed a National Letter of Intent with the LSU Tigers women's gymnastics team.

=== 2024 ===
In April, Miller announced her retirement from elite gymnastics citing a shoulder injury and prioritizing her recovery to be ready for collegiate gymnastics.

== Competitive history ==
Year	Event	Team	AA	VT	UB	BB	FX
Junior
2019	Nastia Liukin Cup		6				
2019	American Classic		5	10	6	5	19
2019	U.S. Classic		12	16	3rd place, bronze medalist(s)	29	21
2019	U.S. National Championships		14	17	16	16	22
Senior
2021	Winter Cup		8	14	5	23	7
2021	U.S. Classic		14		4	33	25
2021	U.S. National Championships		17		6	22	24
2021	Olympic Trials		12		7	12	13
2022	Winter Cup		14		8	23	11
2022	City of Jesolo Trophy	1st place, gold medalist(s)	7		1st place, gold medalist(s)		
2022	Pan American Championships	2nd place, silver medalist(s)			2nd place, silver medalist(s)		
2023	Winter Cup		4		1st place, gold medalist(s)	8	15
2023	DTB Pokal Team Challenge	1st place, gold medalist(s)			1st place, gold medalist(s)		
2023	Pan American Championships	(gold) (Note: Miller was the team USA alternate)					
2023	U.S. Classic		6		1st place, gold medalist(s)	19	20
2023	U.S. National Championships		22		17	15	23
2023	Pan American Games	1st place, gold medalist(s)			1st place, gold medalist(s)		
