= Riley Loos =

American gymnast (born 2000)

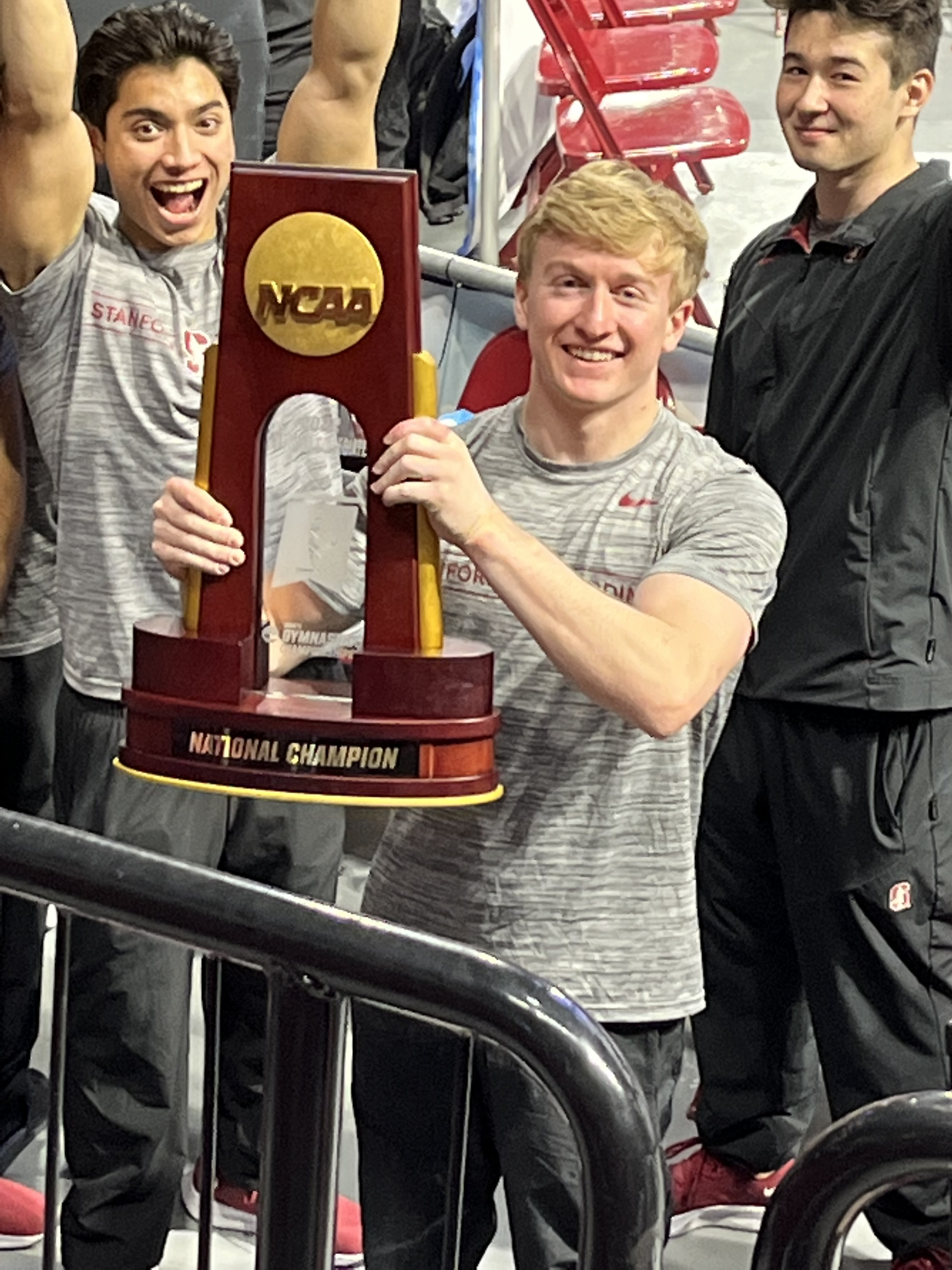
- Loos in 2022

Personal information
- Full name: Riley Austin Loos
- Born: October 6, 2000 (age 26) Folsom, California, U.S.
- Height: 5 ft 5 in (165 cm)

Gymnastics career
- Discipline: Men's artistic gymnastics
- Country represented: United States; (2021–2026)
- College team: Stanford Cardinal
- Head coach: Thom Glielmi
- Eponymous skills: Loos (Pommel horse)
Medal record
Men's artistic gymnastics
Representing United States
Event	1st	2nd	3rd
Pan American Championships	2	2	1
Total	2	2	1
Pan American Championships
Gold medal – first place	2018 Lima	Team
Gold medal – first place	2022 Rio de Janeiro	Team
Silver medal – second place	2021 Rio de Janeiro	Team
Silver medal – second place	2022 Rio de Janeiro	Floor exercise
Bronze medal – third place	2022 Rio de Janeiro	Rings
Bronze medal – third place	2026 Rio de Janeiro	Team
FIG World Cup
Event	1st	2nd	3rd
Apparatus World Cup	0	0	1
World Challenge Cup	0	2	0
Total	0	2	1

Riley Austin Loos (born October 6, 2000) is an American artistic gymnast. He was a member of the gold medal-winning team at both the 2018 and 2022 Pan American Championships. He has been a United States men's national gymnastics team member and competed in collegiate gymnastics for Stanford.

== Early life and education ==
Loos was born in Folsom, California, on October 6, 2000, to Greg and Stephanie Loos. He has two sisters. He attended Oak Ridge High School and later enrolled at Stanford University to pursue gymnastics.

== Gymnastics career ==
=== 2018 ===
In January 2018, Loos competed at the RD761 International Junior Team Cup, where he helped the USA finish third in the team competition. Individually, he finished seventh in the all-around and won silver on floor exercise and bronze on vault. In August Loos competed at the U.S. National Championships in the junior 17-18 division. He placed second in the all-around behind Brandon Briones. Loos was selected to represent the United States at the Pan American Championships alongside Cameron Bock, Spencer Goodell, Kanji Oyama, and Genki Suzuki. Loos helped the United States win gold as a team.

=== 2019 ===
Loos competed at the 2019 Winter Cup where he placed 16th in the all-around but won bronze on floor exercise behind Sam Mikulak and Jacob Moore. In August Loos competed at the U.S. National Championships where he finished 10th in the all-around and fourth on floor exercise.

=== 2020–21 ===
In early 2020, Loos competed at the Winter Cup and finished 18th in the all-around. He also started competing for the Stanford Cardinal in collegiate gymnastics; however the NCAA season was cut short due to the ongoing COVID-19 pandemic.

Loos returned to competition at the 2021 Winter Cup where he finished second in the all-around behind Cameron Bock. He next competed at the 2021 NCAA Championships where he helped Stanford defend their team title. Individually, he won bronze on rings.

Loos was selected to compete at the 2021 Pan American Championships; he helped the team win the silver medal behind Brazil, and individually he finished fourth in the all-around. Due to competing at the Pan American Championships, Loos was invited to compete at the upcoming Olympic Trials.

Loos finished ninth in the all-around at the Olympic Trials and was not added to the team. In September Loos was selected to compete at the Koper Challenge Cup. While there he finished fourth on floor exercise and rings and eighth on vault.

=== 2022 ===
Loos placed eighth in the all-around at the 2022 Winter Cup. He was selected to compete at the DTB Pokal Mixed Cup in Stuttgart alongside Colt Walker, Curran Phillips, Katelyn Jong, Karis German, and Levi Jung-Ruivivar. He competed on floor exercise and horizontal bar, helping the USA win. At the NCAA Championship Loos helped Stanford defend their national title. Additionally, he placed first on rings, winning his first individual national title.

In June, Loos was selected to represent the United States at the Pan American Championships alongside Brody Malone, Yul Moldauer, Colt Walker, and Shane Wiskus. On the first day of competition Loos competed on floor exercise, rings, vault, and horizontal bar to help qualify the United States in first place to the team final. Individually, he won silver on floor exercise behind Moldauer and bronze on rings behind Brazilians Arthur Zanetti and Caio Souza. During the team final Loos competed on floor, pommel horse, rings, vault, and horizontal bar to help the USA win gold ahead of the reigning team champion Brazil.

In late July, Loos competed at the U.S. Classic where he placed seventh in the all-around but recorded the third-highest vault and rings scores.

=== 2023 to present ===
Loos competed at the 2023 Winter Cup and placed sixth in the all-around and second on rings. In March, he competed at the Baku World Cup, winning bronze on floor exercise behind Milad Karimi and Illia Kovtun. In August, Loos competed at the Core Hydration Classic where he placed fifth in the all-around.

Loos was injured in 2024, but was still able to compete at the 2024 National Championships. He failed to make the team and considered retirement. Later, he was an injury replacement on the 2024 Gold Over America Tour for Donnell Whittenburg which caused him to reconsider retirement. At the 2025 Winter Cup, he was the all-around champion and won individual event titles on the floor and still rings.

On May 11, 2026, Loos was selected to represent the United States at the 2026 Pan American Championships. At the competition he helped the USA win bronze as a team and individually he qualified to the floor exercise and rings event finals.

== Eponymous skills ==
Loos has one named element on the pommel horse.

Gymnastics elements named after Riley Loos
Apparatus	Name	Description	Difficulty (Note: Valid for the 2025–2028 Code of Points)	Added to Code of Points
Pommel horse	Loos	Reverse Stockli with hop backwards through handstand on another end.	D, 0.4	Performed at the 2021 World Challenge Cup in Koper

== Competitive history ==
Competitive history of Riley Loos
Year	Event	Team	AA	FX	PH	SR	VT	PB	HB
2018	RD761 International Junior Team Cup	3rd place, bronze medalist(s)	7	2nd place, silver medalist(s)			3rd place, bronze medalist(s)		
2018	Winter Cup		14	8	20	16	15	22	14
2018	U.S. National Championships		2nd place, silver medalist(s)	2nd place, silver medalist(s)	1st place, gold medalist(s)	3rd place, bronze medalist(s)	3rd place, bronze medalist(s)	6	4
2018	Pan American Championships	1st place, gold medalist(s)							
2019	Winter Cup		16	3rd place, bronze medalist(s)	10	8	12	19	12
2019	Calgary International Cup	1st place, gold medalist(s)	6	1st place, gold medalist(s)					
2019	U.S. National Championships		10	4	10	11	23	16	9
2020	Winter Cup		18						
2021	Winter Cup		2nd place, silver medalist(s)						
2021	NCAA Championships	1st place, gold medalist(s)		4		3rd place, bronze medalist(s)			6
2021	Pan American Championships	2nd place, silver medalist(s)	4						
2021	Olympic Trials		9	11	14	6	2nd place, silver medalist(s)	14	9
2021	Koper Challenge Cup			4		4	8		
2022	Winter Cup		8	7	5	4	4	4	15
2022	DTB Pokal Mixed Cup	1st place, gold medalist(s)							
2022	MPSF Championships	1st place, gold medalist(s)		4					
2022	NCAA Championships	1st place, gold medalist(s)		5		1st place, gold medalist(s)			
2022	Koper Challenge Cup			2nd place, silver medalist(s)		2nd place, silver medalist(s)			
2022	Pan American Championships	1st place, gold medalist(s)		2nd place, silver medalist(s)		3rd place, bronze medalist(s)			
2022	U.S. Classic		7	11	17	3rd place, bronze medalist(s)	3rd place, bronze medalist(s)	12	27
2022	U.S. National Championships		10	12	18	5	4	25	20
2023	Winter Cup		6	8	11	2nd place, silver medalist(s)		8	5
2023	Baku World Cup			3rd place, bronze medalist(s)		8			
2023	MPSF Championships	1st place, gold medalist(s)		4		5	11		
2023	NCAA Championships	1st place, gold medalist(s)		16		10			
2023	U.S. Classic		5	4	43	4	15	8	6
2023	U.S. National Championships		10	9	12	7		12	17
2024	Winter Cup		3rd place, bronze medalist(s)	5	18	5		15	7
2024	DTB Pokal Team Challenge	1st place, gold medalist(s)							
2024	DTB Pokal Mixed Cup	1st place, gold medalist(s)							
2024	U.S. National Championships		13	9	17	7		22	12
2025	Winter Cup		1st place, gold medalist(s)	1st place, gold medalist(s)	14	1st place, gold medalist(s)		12	4
2025	DTB Pokal Team Challenge	2nd place, silver medalist(s)				2nd place, silver medalist(s)			
2025	DTB Pokal Mixed Cup	1st place, gold medalist(s)							
2026	Winter Cup			3rd place, bronze medalist(s)	9	5			
2026	Pan American Championships	3rd place, bronze medalist(s)		WD		6			
