= Levi Ruivivar =

Filipino-American artistic gymnast (born 2006)

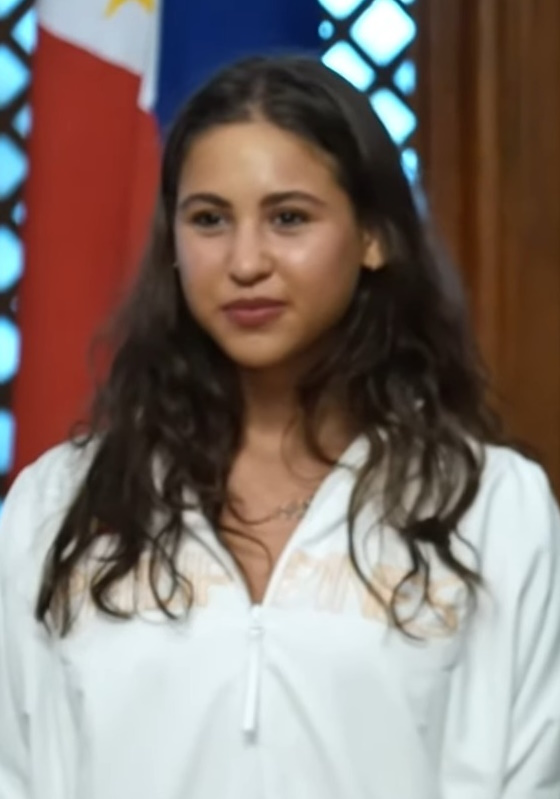
- Ruivivar in 2024

Personal information
- Full name: Levi Jung Ruivivar
- Born: May 3, 2006 (age 20) Los Angeles, California, U.S.
- Height: 5 ft 6 in (168 cm)
- Relatives: Anthony Ruivivar (father)

Gymnastics career
- Discipline: Women's artistic gymnastics
- Country represented: Philippines; (2023–present)
- Former countries represented: United States (2021–2023)
- College team: Stanford Cardinal (2025–28)
- Club: World Olympic Gymnastics Academy
- Head coach: Valeri Liukin
Medal record
Representing Philippines
Asian Championships
Bronze medal – third place	2024 Tashkent	Uneven bars
FIG World Cup
Event	1st	2nd	3rd
Apparatus World Cup	0	1	0
Total	0	1	0

Levi Jung Ruivivar (born May 3, 2006) is a Filipino-American artistic gymnast. Born in the United States, she represents the Philippines internationally and competed for her country of birth in the past. She represented the Philippines at the 2024 Summer Olympics and is the 2024 Asian Championships bronze medalist on the uneven bars.

== Early life ==
Ruivivar was born in Los Angeles on May 3, 2006, to actors Anthony Ruivivar and Yvonne Jung. She has two brothers– Kainoa and Kale. She began gymnastics when she was 18 months old. Her paternal grandfather, Tony Ruivivar, was born in the Philippines before moving to Hawaii where he became a founding member of the Society of Seven.

== Gymnastics career ==
=== 2018 ===
Jung-Ruivivar qualified for domestic elite gymnastics competition with a third-place finish at the 2018 Desert Lights National Qualifier. Her first elite competition was the WOGA Classic where she placed fifth in the all-around and won the silver medal on the uneven bars behind Kayla DiCello. She placed seventh all-around at the American Classic held in Salt Lake City. She then placed 16th all-around at the U.S. Classic. At the U.S. Championships, she finished 18th in the all-around. Her final competition of the season was the Tournoi International held in Combs la Ville, France where she won the all-around title in the espoir division. In the event finals, she won the silver medals on both vault and uneven bars.

=== 2019 ===
Jung-Ruivivar finished 21st in the all-around at the American Classic, but she won the silver medal on the uneven bars behind Ciena Alipio. She placed 30th all-around at the U.S. Classic and then 26th all-around at the U.S. Championships. In September, she moved from her hometown gym Paramount Elite to Twin City Twisters in Champlin, Minnesota.

=== 2021 ===
Jung-Ruivivar did not compete in 2020 due to the COVID-19 pandemic postponing or canceling most competitions. She returned to competition at the 2021 Winter Cup where she won the gold medal on the uneven bars and placed sixth in the all-around. She was named to the U.S. junior national team in March. After the national team camp, she had surgery on both of her wrists, causing her to miss the summer elite competitions. She returned to competition in November for the 2021 Junior Pan American Games selection camp and placed third in the all-around behind Katelyn Jong and Kailin Chio. She was selected as the non-traveling alternate for the U.S. team.

=== 2022 ===
Jung-Ruivivar became age-eligible for senior-level competition in 2022. At the Winter Cup, she placed eighth in the all-around. She made her international debut for the United States at the DTB Pokal Mixed Cup in Stuttgart alongside Katelyn Jong, Karis German, Riley Loos, Curran Phillips, and Colt Walker. They finished first as a team. She only competed on the uneven bars and balance beam at the U.S. Classic, finishing seventh and tenth, respectively. She then finished 14th in the all-around at the U.S. Championships. In October, she competed at the Szomabathely World Challenge Cup and placed sixth on floor exercise. Then in November, she announced she was leaving Twin City Twisters and going to the World Olympic Gymnastics Academy in Plano, Texas.

=== 2023 ===
Jung-Ruivivar finished 19th in the all-around at the Winter Cup. She competed on the uneven bars at the balance beam at the U.S. Classic and placed 16th and 32nd, respectively. She then finished 25th in the all-around National Championships. In September, she announced she would represent the Philippines in international competition. Then in November, Ruivivar signed her National Letter of Intent with the Stanford Cardinal to join in the 2025 season.

=== 2024 ===
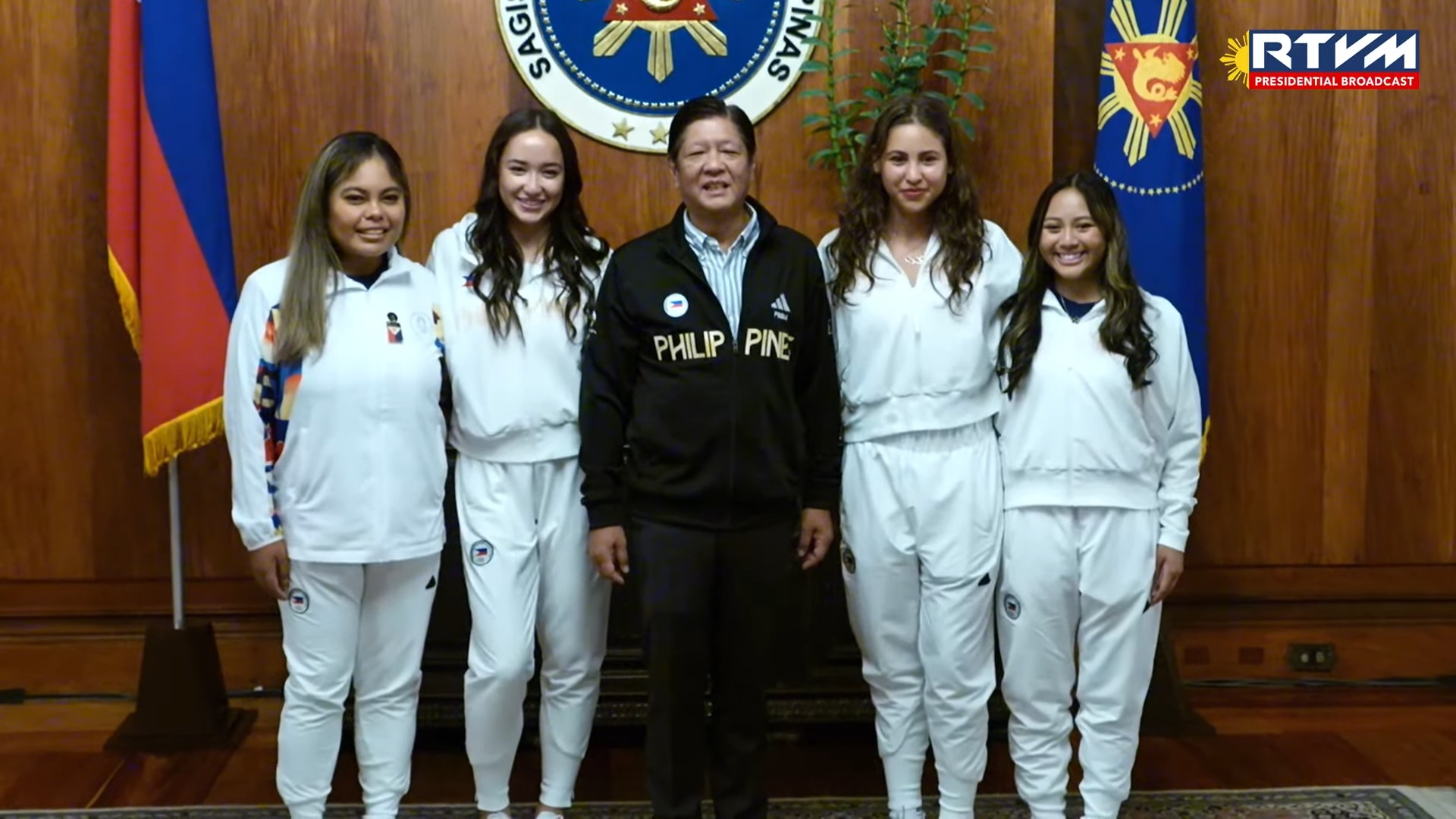
Ruivivar (second from right) meeting President Bongbong Marcos

Jung-Ruivivar competed in the FIG World Cup series in an attempt to qualify for the 2024 Olympic Games. She did not qualify for any event finals at the Cairo and Cottbus World Cups. She placed eighth on the uneven bars in Baku, and she won the silver medal in Doha behind Kaylia Nemour. At the conclusion of the World Cup series Ruivivar earned 62 points on the uneven bars which earned her an individual Olympic berth. She was the third Filipino artistic gymnast to qualify for the 2024 Olympic Games after Carlos Yulo and Aleah Finnegan qualified at the previous year's World Championships. Ruivivar next competed at the Asian Championships where she helped the Philippines finish seventh as a team and individually she finished sixth in the all-around and qualified to the uneven bars final. During event finals she won bronze on the uneven bars behind Yang Fanyuwei of China and Jon Jang-mi of North Korea. At the Olympics, she finished 40th in the all-around, placing 40th in the uneven bars, 64th on balance beam, and 54th on floor exercise.

=== 2025–2026 ===
In January 2025, Ruivivar revealed that she was suffering from an eating disorder which prompted her to take a leave from Stanford University and from competitive sports.

Ruivivar returned to competition in 2026, competing as a redshirt freshman for the Stanford Cardinal. In February 2026, she received the CalHOPE Courage Award, which honors student-athletes at California colleges and universities who have overcome stress, anxiety, and mental trauma associated with personal hardships and adversity.

Ruivivar made her elite return at the 2026 Asian Games. On the first day of competition she finished tenth in the all-around and helped the Philippines qualify for the team final; she was the first reserve for the uneven bars final and second reserve for the floor exercise final. During the team final, Ruivivar contributed scores on uneven bars, balance beam, and floor exercise towards the Philippines' sixth place finish.

== Modeling and acting career ==
On August 29, 2024, Jung-Ruvivar signed with Viva Artist Agency for modeling and acting, while continuing her gymnastics training. She has done some voiceover work for Doc McStuffins and was in a short directed by Gary Baseman.

== Competitive history ==
=== Representing the United States ===
Competitive history of Levi Ruivivar at the junior level
Year	Event	Team	AA	VT	UB	BB	FX
2018	WOGA Classic		5		2nd place, silver medalist(s)		
2018	American Classic		7	30	7	4	15
2018	U.S. Classic		16	34	18	11	15
2018	U.S. Championships		18	19	7	21	12
2018	Tournoi International		1st place, gold medalist(s)	2nd place, silver medalist(s)	2nd place, silver medalist(s)		6
2019	American Classic		21	22	2nd place, silver medalist(s)	27	21
2019	U.S. Classic		30	29	32	9	36
2019	U.S. Championships		26	25	21	25	20
2021	Winter Cup		6	9	1st place, gold medalist(s)	8	13

Competitive history of Levi Ruivivar at the senior level
Year	Event	Team	AA	VT	UB	BB	FX
2022	Winter Cup		8		5	10	14
2022	DTB Pokal Mixed Cup	1st place, gold medalist(s)					
2022	U.S. Classic				7	10	
2022	U.S. Championships		14		16	10	14
2022	Szombathely World Challenge Cup						6
2023	Winter Cup		19		21	23	19
2023	U.S. Classic				16	32	
2023	U.S. Championships		25		18	20	26

=== Representing the Philippines ===
Competitive history of Levi Ruivivar
Year	Event	Team	AA	VT	UB	BB	FX
2024	Baku World Cup				8		
2024	Doha World Cup				2nd place, silver medalist(s)		
2024	Asian Championships	7	6		3rd place, bronze medalist(s)		
2024	Olympic Games		40				
2026
2026	Asian Games	6	10		R1		R2

== See also ==
- Nationality changes in gymnastics
