= Twin City Twisters =

Gymnastics training facility in Champlin, Minnesota, United States

- Full name: Twin City Twisters Gymnastics
- Nicknames: TCT
- Sport: Artistic gymnastics
- Founded: 1987; 27 years ago
- League: USA Gymnastics
- Based in: Champlin, Minnesota
- Owner: Mike Hunger
- Head coach: Sami Wozney
- Members: Maggie Nichols; Grace McCallum; Jessie DeZiel; Olivia Trautman; Abby Paulson
- Website: twincitytwisters.com

Twin City Twisters, commonly shortened to TCT, is an artistic gymnastics facility located in Champlin, Minnesota. A number of elite and collegiate gymnasts have trained there, including World champions Maggie Nichols and Lexi Zeiss, Olympic medalist Grace McCallum, and Pan American Games champion Jessie DeZiel.

== History ==
Mike Hunger opened the facility in 1987.

The program was involved in the USA Gymnastics sex abuse scandal as Maggie Nichols and coach Sarah Jantzi were among the first to speak out about Larry Nassar.

In 2024, the organization hired Tom Farden, the former head coach of Utah Red Rocks, who left Utah after abuse allegations surfaced around the program.

== Coaching staff ==
- Mike Hunger - Former owner and head coach
- Sami Wozney
- Sarah Jantzi - Head elite coach
- Rich Stenger - Minnesota Golden Gophers assistant coach, former Roseville High School assistant coach

== Notable alumni ==
The following gymnasts are TCT alumni:

Jessie DeZiel

- U.S. National Team (2011–2012)
- 2011 Pan American Games team champion
- Nebraska Cornhuskers (2012–2015)

Grace McCallum

- 2020 Olympic team silver medalist
- U.S. National Team (2018–2022)
- 2018 World team champion
- 2019 World team champion
- Utah Gymnastics (2022–2025)

Maggie Nichols

- U.S. National Team (2012–2017)
- 2015 World team champion, floor exercise bronze medalist
- Oklahoma Sooners (2017–2020) - 7x NCAA Champion

Lexi Zeiss

- U.S. National Team (2022–2023)
- 2022 World team champion (alternate)

Abby Paulson

- U.S. National Team (2017)
- 2017 City of Jesolo floor champion, all-around bronze medalist
- Utah Gymnastics (2020–2024)

Gabrielle Hardie

- U.S. National Team (2025–2026)
- U.S. Junior National Team (2023–2025)

Levi Ruivivar

- U.S. National Team (2022–2023)
- U.S. Junior National Team (2021–2022)

Elle Mueller

- U.S. National Team (2022–2023)
