= Junior World Artistic Gymnastics Championships – Boys' team all-around =

The Junior World Championships in artistic gymnastics were first held in 2019. Originally meant to be held every two years, the second edition of the event was not held until 2023 due to the COVID-19 pandemic.

Three medals are awarded: gold for first place, silver for second place, and bronze for third place. Tie breakers were used in the first year of the event but were not used subsequently.

== Medalists ==
Year	Location	Gold	Silver	Bronze	Ref
2019	(Hungary) Győr	(Japan) Japan; Ryosuke Doi; Takeru Kitazono; Shinnosuke Oka; Azusa Emata	(Ukraine) Ukraine; Nazar Chepurnyi; Volodymyr Kostiuk; Illia Kovtun; Dmytro Shyshko	(Italy) Italy; Lorenzo Bonicelli; Ivan Brunello; Lorenzo Minh Casali; Mirko Galimberti	
2023	(Turkey) Antalya	(Japan) Japan; Kamiyama Haruto; Tanida Masaharu; Tsunogai Tomoharu; Noda Renato	(China) China; He Xiang; Qin Guohuan; Yang Chunjie; Zhang Yangyu	(Italy) Italy; Manuel Berettera; Tommaso Brugnami; Riccardo Villa; Lorenzo Tomei	
2025	(Philippines) Manila	(China) China; Wang Chengcheng; Yang Lanbin; Zheng Ao; Long Houcheng	(Japan) Japan; Taiki Kakutani; Nao Ojima; Eijun Yasui; Tomoharu Tanida	(United States) United States; Danila Leykin; Dante Reive; Nathan Roman; Maksim Kan	

== All-time medal count ==
Last updated after the 2025 Junior World Championships.

Rank	Nation	Gold	Silver	Bronze	Total
1	Japan	2	1	0	3
2	China	1	1	0	2
3	Ukraine	0	1	0	1
4	Italy	0	0	2	2
5	United States	0	0	1	1
Totals (5 entries)		3	3	3	9
