= Junior World Artistic Gymnastics Championships – Boys' individual all-around =

The Junior World Championships in artistic gymnastics were first held in 2019. Originally meant to be held every two years, the second edition of the event was not held until 2023 due to the COVID-19 pandemic.

Three medals are awarded: gold for first place, silver for second place, and bronze for third place. Tie breakers were used in the first year of the event but were not used subsequently.

== Medalists ==
Year	Location	Gold	Silver	Bronze	Ref
2019	(Hungary) Győr	(Japan) Shinnosuke Oka	(Japan) Ryosuke Doi	(Ukraine) Illia Kovtun	
2023	(Turkey) Antalya	(China) Qin Guohuan	(Colombia) Ángel Barajas	(Italy) Riccardo Villa	
2025	(Philippines) Manila	(Individual Neutral Athletes) Arsenii Dukhno	(Japan) Nao Ojima	(China) Yang Lanbin	

== All-time medal count ==
Last updated after the 2025 Junior World Championships.

Rank	Nation	Gold	Silver	Bronze	Total
1	Japan	1	2	0	3
2	China	1	0	1	2
–	Individual Neutral Athletes	1	0	0	1
3	Colombia	0	1	0	1
4	Italy	0	0	1	1
4	Ukraine	0	0	1	1
Totals (5 entries)		3	3	3	9
