= Sofia Shtykhetskaya =

Belarusian artistic gymnast (born 2010)

- София Штыхецкая
- Full name: Sofia Yuryevna Shtykhetskaya
- Born: 26 August 2010 (age 16) Belarus

Gymnastics career
- Discipline: Women's artistic gymnastics
- Country represented: Belarus; (2023–present)
Medal record
Representing Belarus & (Individual Neutral Athletes) AIN
FIG World Cup
Event	1st	2nd	3rd
Apparatus World Cup	0	0	1
World Challenge Cup	0	0	1
Total	0	0	2

Sofia Yuryevna Shtykhetskaya (Russian: София юрьевна Штыхецкая; born 26 August 2010) is a Belarusian artistic gymnast. She competed at the 2025 Junior World Championships.

== Gymnastics career ==
=== Junior: 2023–2025 ===
Shtykhetskaya primarily competed at domestic or Russian meets as a junior due to the ban on Belarusian and Russian athletes after the latter's 2022 invasion of Ukraine.

In 2025, she competed at the Legends of Gymnastics tournament, which was attended by athletes from Russia, Belarus, Uzbekistan, and Kazakhstan. In the team final, she helped her cohort of Belarusian athletes win bronze behind two Russian teams. Individually she won the junior all-around title and all four apparatus titles. She next competed at the Strongest Athletes Cup in Moscow where she won silver in the all-around behind Diana Gainulina.

Shtykhetskaya made her international debut at the 2025 Junior World Championships, where she competed as a neutral athlete. She finished ninth in the all-around and eighth on floor exercise.

=== Senior: 2026–present ===
Shtykhetskaya became age-eligible for senior level competition in 2026. She made her senior debut at the 2026 Baku World Cup where she won bronze on the uneven bars behind Kaylia Nemour and Leila Vasilieva. She next competed at the 2026 European Championships. While there she helped Belarus (competing as World Gymnastics 1) place thirteenth as team during the qualification round which qualified them a full team to the upcoming World Championships. Individually she placed thirty-fourth in the all-around and qualified to the uneven bars final where she ultimately placed seventh after falling off the apparatus. At the 2026 Paris World Challenge Cup, Shtykhetskaya won bronze on the uneven bars behind Elena Colas and Emelie Westlund. At the 2026 World Championships, Shtykhetskaya helped Belarus finish twenty-second as a team during the qualification round.

== Competitive history ==
Competitive history of Sofia Shtykhetskaya
Year	Event	Team	AA	VT	UB	BB	FX
2023	Belarus Open Cup	2nd place, silver medalist(s)	2nd place, silver medalist(s)	2nd place, silver medalist(s)	3rd place, bronze medalist(s)	2nd place, silver medalist(s)	4
2023	Russian Junior Championships		7	1st place, gold medalist(s)			4
2024	Belarus Open Cup	2nd place, silver medalist(s)	2nd place, silver medalist(s)	2nd place, silver medalist(s)	1st place, gold medalist(s)	2nd place, silver medalist(s)	4
2025	Gymnastics Legends Tournament	3rd place, bronze medalist(s)	1st place, gold medalist(s)	1st place, gold medalist(s)	1st place, gold medalist(s)	1st place, gold medalist(s)	1st place, gold medalist(s)
2025	Strongest Athletes Cup		2nd place, silver medalist(s)	2nd place, silver medalist(s)	2nd place, silver medalist(s)	3rd place, bronze medalist(s)	2nd place, silver medalist(s)
2025	Junior World Championships		9				8
2026	Baku World Cup				3rd place, bronze medalist(s)		
2026	European Championships	13	34		7		
2026	Paris World Challenge Cup				3rd place, bronze medalist(s)		
2026	World Championships	22					
