= Lucia Piliarová =

Slovak artistic gymnast

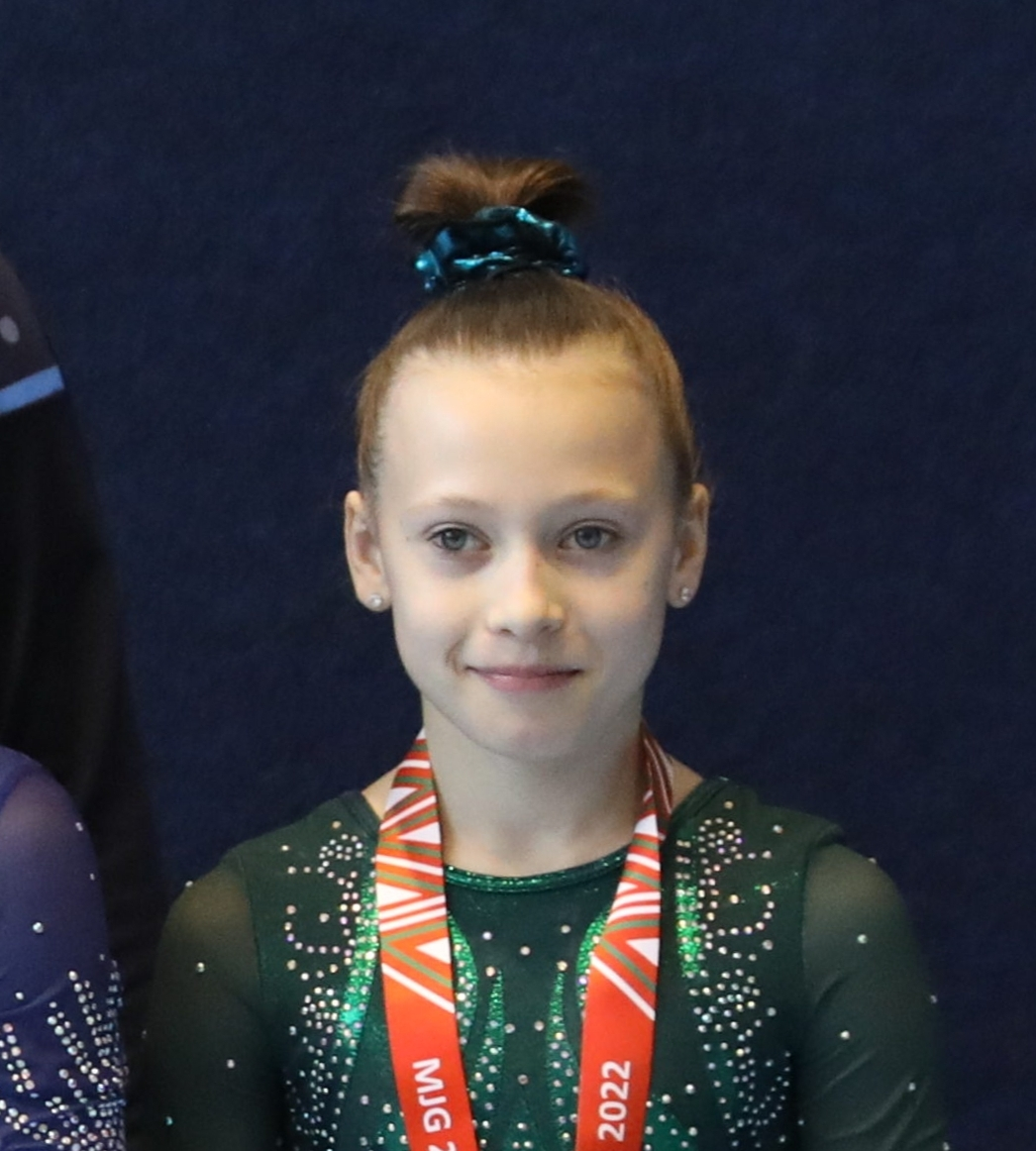
- Piliarová in 2022

Personal information
- Full name: Lucia Piliarová
- Born: 11 June 2011 (age 15) Zvolen, Slovakia

Gymnastics career
- Discipline: Women's artistic gymnastics
- Country represented: Slovakia (2022–present)
- Club: KŠG Detva
- Head coach: Katarína Krekáňová
Medal record
Representing Slovakia
Junior World Championships
Silver medal – second place	2025 Manila	Uneven bars

Lucia Piliarová (born 11 June 2011) is a Slovak artistic gymnast. She is the 2025 Junior World uneven bars silver medalist.

== Early life ==
Piliarová began training gymnastics when she was three years old. She has an older brother who is a figure skater.

== Junior gymnastics career ==
Piliarová competed at the 2025 European Youth Olympic Festival where she helped the Slovak team win a historic silver medal in the team competition. Individually she won silver in the all-around behind Elena Colas of France.

In late November Piliarová competed at the 2025 Junior World Championships. During the all-around final she finished tenth. During apparatus finals she won the silver medal on uneven bars behind neutral athlete Milana Kaiumova. In winning this medal, Piliarová became the first Slovak gymnast to win a medal at the World Championship level, as the feat had not yet been achieved at the senior level.

== Competitive history ==
Competitive history of Lucia Piliarová
Year	Event	Team	AA	VT	UB	BB	FX
2022	Hanspeter Demetz Memorial		2nd place, silver medalist(s)				
2022	Zelena Jama Open	8	4				
2022	Elek Matolay Memorial		8		6		4
2022	Salamunov Memorial		3rd place, bronze medalist(s)				
2022	Gym Festival Trnava		2nd place, silver medalist(s)				
2023	Elek Matolay Memorial		1st place, gold medalist(s)	3rd place, bronze medalist(s)	1st place, gold medalist(s)	1st place, gold medalist(s)	1st place, gold medalist(s)
2023	Hanspeter Demetz Memorial		1st place, gold medalist(s)				
2023	Salamunov Memorial		1st place, gold medalist(s)				
2024	Elek Matolay Memorial		1st place, gold medalist(s)	1st place, gold medalist(s)	1st place, gold medalist(s)	1st place, gold medalist(s)	2nd place, silver medalist(s)
2025	Elek Matolay Memorial		1st place, gold medalist(s)	1st place, gold medalist(s)	1st place, gold medalist(s)	1st place, gold medalist(s)	1st place, gold medalist(s)
2025	International GymSport		1st place, gold medalist(s)	1st place, gold medalist(s)	1st place, gold medalist(s)		
2025	Prievidza Friendly		1st place, gold medalist(s)				
2025	European Youth Olympic Festival	2nd place, silver medalist(s)	2nd place, silver medalist(s)		4		9
2025	Junior World Championships		10		2nd place, silver medalist(s)		
2026
2026	European Championships	11	4		R1		
