= Jiang Shuting =

Chinese gymnast

- 蒋淑婷
- Born: 26 August 2010 (age 16) Hunan, China

Gymnastics career
- Discipline: Women's artistic gymnastics
- Country represented: China
Medal record
Representing China
Women's artistic gymnastics
World Championships
FIG World Cup
Event	1st	2nd	3rd
World Cup	0	1	0

Jiang Shuting (Chinese: 蒋淑婷, born 26 August 2010) is a Chinese artistic gymnast.

== Career ==
=== Junior ===
==== 2025 ====
In November at the 2025 Junior World Artistic Gymnastics Championships, she was part of the Chinese team that finished fourth in the team event behind France, Japan, and the United States. Individually, she qualified for the finals in the all-around and on eneven bars, where she placed eighth and seventh respectively.

=== Senior ===
==== 2026 ====
In April, she debuted on the senior international level, together with Ke Qinqin, at the World Cup event in Cairo, Egypt. She competed on vault and on uneven bars, qualifying for the finals on both apparatuses. In the uneven bars final, she scored a 13.700 to win the silver behind Kaylia Nemour.
