= Sol Scott =

British gymnast (born 2007)

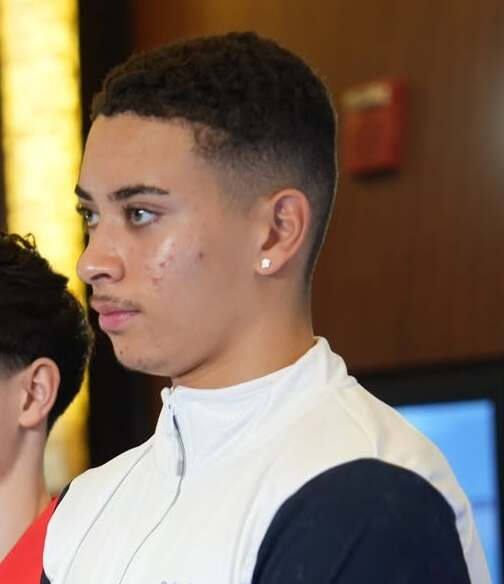
- Scott at the 2025 Junior World Championships

Personal information
- Born: 9 April 2007 (age 19) Huntingdon, England

Gymnastics career
- Discipline: Men's artistic gymnastics
- Country represented: (United Kingdom) Great Britain (2026–present)
- Gym: Huntingdon Olympic Gymnastics Club
Medal record
Men's artistic gymnastics
Representing Great Britain
European Championships
Gold medal – first place	2026 Zagreb	Team
Bronze medal – third place	2026 Zagreb	Vault
Junior World Championships
Silver medal – second place	2025 Manila	Vault
FIG World Cup
Event	1st	2nd	3rd
Apparatus World Cup	0	1	0
Total	0	1	0

Sol Scott (born 9 April 2007) is a British artistic gymnast and a member of Great Britain men's national artistic gymnastics team.

== Gymnastics career ==
In April 2024, Scott competed in the junior division at the 2024 European Men's Artistic Gymnastics Championships and won gold on vault and helped Great Britain win gold in the team event. He also placed fourth on floor exercise. In November 2025, he competed at the 2025 Junior World Artistic Gymnastics Championships and won a silver medal on vault with a score of 14.066. He also placed sixth in the individual all-around with a score of 78.997.

In January 2026, he was selected to represent Great Britain at the 2026 American Cup along with Oakley Banks, Sam Mostowfi, Abigail Martin, Emily Roper and Ruby Stacey. The team finished in fifth place overall. In March 2026, he competed at the British Gymnastics Championships and won a gold medal on vault with a score of 14.425.

On 7 July 2026, he was selected to represent Great Britain at the 2026 European Men's Artistic Gymnastics Championships, along with Joe Fraser, Harry Hepworth, Jonas Rushworth, Jack Stanley and Courtney Tullock. He made his senior international championship debut during the competition and won a bronze medal on vault with a score of 14.199. He also helped Great Britain win gold in the team event with a score of 246.728.

== Competitive history ==
Competitive history of Sol Scott
Year	Event	Team	AA	FX	PH	SR	VT	PB	HB
2023	European Youth Olympic Festival	1st place, gold medalist(s)					3rd place, bronze medalist(s)		
2024
2024	Junior European Championships	1st place, gold medalist(s)	11	4			1st place, gold medalist(s)		9
2025
2025	Junior World Championships	5	6				2nd place, silver medalist(s)		
2026	Cottbus World Cup						2nd place, silver medalist(s)		
2026	American Cup	5							
2026	British Championships						1st place, gold medalist(s)		
2026	European Championships	1st place, gold medalist(s)					3rd place, bronze medalist(s)		
