= 2026 FIG Artistic Gymnastics World Cup series =

International gymnastics contest

FIG Artistic Gymnastics World Cup series
- Location: various — see locations
- Date: February 19 – September 27, 2026 see schedule

The 2026 FIG World Cup circuit in Artistic Gymnastics is a series of competitions officially organized and promoted by World Gymnastics.

== Schedule ==
=== World Cup series ===
Date	Location	Event	Type
February 19–22	(Germany) Cottbus	FIG World Cup 2026	C III – Apparatus
March 5–8	(Azerbaijan) Baku	FIG World Cup 2026	C III – Apparatus
March 12–15	(Turkey) Antalya	FIG World Cup 2026	C III – Apparatus
April 3–6	(Egypt) Cairo	FIG World Cup 2026	C III – Apparatus
April 9–12	(Croatia) Osijek	FIG World Cup 2026	C III – Apparatus
~~April 15–18~~	~~(Qatar) Doha~~	Cancelled	

=== World Challenge Cup series ===
Date	Location	Event	Type
May 7–10	(Bulgaria) Varna	FIG World Challenge Cup 2026	C III – Apparatus
May 21–24	(Uzbekistan) Tashkent	FIG World Challenge Cup 2026	C III – Apparatus
May 28–31	(Slovenia) Koper	FIG World Challenge Cup 2026	C III – Apparatus
September 18–20	(Hungary) Szombathely	FIG World Challenge Cup 2026	C III – Apparatus
September 26–27	(France) Paris	FIG World Challenge Cup 2026	C III – Apparatus

== Series winners ==
Apparatus	Apparatus World Cup	World Challenge Cup
Apparatus	Winner	
Men
Floor Exercise	(Individual Neutral Athletes) Yahor Sharamkou	(Bulgaria) Dimitar Dimitrov
Pommel Horse	(Kazakhstan) Zeinolla Idrissov	(Croatia) Mateo Žugec
Rings	(Armenia) Artur Avetisyan	(Armenia) Artur Avetisyan
Vault	(Ukraine) Nazar Chepurnyi	(Bulgaria) Daniel Trifonov
Parallel Bars	(Colombia) Ángel Barajas	(Bulgaria) Yordan Aleksandrov
Horizontal Bar	(Chinese Taipei) Tang Chia-hung	(Bulgaria) Daniel Trifonov
Women
Vault	(Slovenia) Teja Belak	(United Kingdom) Emily Roper
Uneven Bars	(Algeria) Kaylia Nemour	(Ukraine) Diana Lobok
Balance Beam	(Algeria) Kaylia Nemour	(Croatia) Tina Zelčić
Floor Exercise	(Individual Neutral Athletes) Anna Kalmykova	(Croatia) Antea Šikić Kaučič

== Medalists ==
=== Men ===
==== World Cup series ====
Competition	Event	Gold	Silver	Bronze
Cottbus	Floor Exercise	(Israel) Artem Dolgopyat	(Individual Neutral Athletes) Yahor Sharamkou	(Individual Neutral Athletes) Aleksandr Kartsev
Cottbus	Pommel Horse	(Italy) Gabriele Targhetta	(Armenia) Mamikon Khachatryan	(Kazakhstan) Nariman Kurbanov
Cottbus	Rings	(Armenia) Artur Avetisyan	(Azerbaijan) Nikita Simonov	(United States) Kameron Nelson
Cottbus	Vault	(Ukraine) Nazar Chepurnyi	(United Kingdom) Sol Scott	(Italy) Ares Federici
Cottbus	Parallel Bars	(Japan) Shohei Kawakami	(Individual Neutral Athletes) Aleksandr Kartsev	(Individual Neutral Athletes) Savelii Sieedin
Cottbus	Horizontal Bar	(Japan) Shohei Kawakami	(Colombia) Ángel Barajas	(Individual Neutral Athletes) Aleksandr Kartsev
Baku	Floor Exercise	(Individual Neutral Athletes) Yahor Sharamkou	(Kazakhstan) Milad Karimi	(Japan) Kazuki Minami
Baku	Pommel Horse	(Bulgaria) David Ivanov	(Belgium) Kilan Van Der Aa	(Australia) Jesse Moore
Baku	Rings	(Individual Neutral Athletes) Ilia Zaika	(Greece) Eleftherios Petrounias	(Japan) Kiichi Kaneta
Baku	Vault	(Ukraine) Nazar Chepurnyi	(Japan) Wataru Tanigawa	(Individual Neutral Athletes) Aleksei Usachev
Baku	Parallel Bars	(Colombia) Ángel Barajas	(Japan) Wataru Tanigawa	(Australia) Jesse Moore
Baku	Horizontal Bar	(Chinese Taipei) Tang Chia-hung	(Kazakhstan) Milad Karimi	(Colombia) Ángel Barajas
Antalya	Floor Exercise	(Philippines) Eldrew Yulo	(Republic of Ireland) Eamon Montgomery	(Spain) Rayderley Zapata
Antalya	Pommel Horse	(Republic of Ireland) Rhys McClenaghan	(Kazakhstan) Zeinolla Idrissov	(Republic of Ireland) James Hickey
Antalya	Rings	(Turkey) Adem Asil	(United Kingdom) Courtney Tulloch	(Azerbaijan) Nikita Simonov
Antalya	Vault	(Norway) Sebastian Sponevik	(Czech Republic) Jonas Danek	(Individual Neutral Athletes) Timofei Akinshin
Antalya	Parallel Bars	(Japan) Shinnosuke Oka	(Colombia) Ángel Barajas	(Turkey) Ferhat Arıcan
Antalya	Horizontal Bar	(Chinese Taipei) Tang Chia-hung	(Colombia) Ángel Barajas	(Croatia) Tin Srbić
Cairo	Floor Exercise	(Individual Neutral Athletes) Daniel Marinov	(Individual Neutral Athletes) Arsenii Dukhno	(Philippines) Eldrew Yulo
Cairo	Pommel Horse	(Armenia) Hamlet Manukyan	(Kazakhstan) Zeinolla Idrissov	(Kazakhstan) Nariman Kurbanov
Cairo	Rings	(Greece) Eleftherios Petrounias	(Armenia) Artur Avetisyan	(China) Liu Yang
Cairo	Vault	(Armenia) Artur Davtyan	(Kazakhstan) Assan Salimov	(Czech Republic) Jonas Danek
Cairo	Parallel Bars	(China) Liu Yang	(Egypt) Mohamed Afify	(Individual Neutral Athletes) Arsenii Dukhno
Cairo	Horizontal Bar	(China) Li Hongyan	(Cyprus) Marios Georgiou	(Philippines) Eldrew Yulo
Osijek	Floor Exercise	(Israel) Artem Dolgopyat	(United Kingdom) Harry Hepworth	(Israel) Noam Berkovich
Osijek	Pommel Horse	(Armenia) Hamlet Manukyan	(Kazakhstan) Zeinolla Idrissov	(Kazakhstan) Nariman Kurbanov
Osijek	Rings	(China) Liu Hengyu	(United Kingdom) Harry Hepworth	(Armenia) Artur Avetisyan
Osijek	Vault	(United Kingdom) Harry Hepworth	(Armenia) Artur Davtyan	(Ukraine) Nazar Chepurnyi
Osijek	Parallel Bars	(Colombia) Ángel Barajas	(United States) Donnell Whittenburg	(Turkey) Ferhat Arıcan
Osijek	Horizontal Bar	(Chinese Taipei) Tang Chia-Hung	(Kazakhstan) Milad Karimi	(Colombia) Ángel Barajas

==== World Challenge Cup series ====
Competition	Event	Gold	Silver	Bronze
Varna	Floor Exercise	(Belgium) Victor Tournicourt	(Austria) Martin Miggitsch	(Uzbekistan) Ravshan Kamiljanov
Varna	Pommel Horse	(Bulgaria) David Ivanov	(Uzbekistan) Ravshan Kamiljanov	(Ukraine) Ihor Dyshuk
Varna	Rings	(Armenia) Artur Avetisyan	(Germany) Artur Sahakyan	(Uzbekistan) Akhrorkhon Temirkhonov
Varna	Vault	(Malaysia) Ng Chun Chen	(Bulgaria) Daniel Trifonov	(Hungary) Botond Molnár
Varna	Parallel Bars	(Turkey) Altan Doğan	(Bulgaria) Yoan Ivanov	(Israel) Ron Pyatov
Varna	Horizontal Bar	(Bulgaria) Daniel Trifonov	(Germany) Timo Eder	(Israel) Ron Ortal
Tashkent	Floor Exercise	(Kazakhstan) Emil Akhmejanov	(Uzbekistan) Khumoyun Islomov	(Mongolia) Enkhtuvshin Damdindorj
Tashkent	Pommel Horse	(Bulgaria) Rayan Radkov	(Uzbekistan) Mansur Rahmatov	(Kazakhstan) Diyas Toishybek
Tashkent	Rings	(Uzbekistan) Akhrorkhon Temirkhonov	(Vietnam) Nguyen Van Khanh Phong	(Uzbekistan) Ozotilla Abdurasulov
Tashkent	Vault	(Bulgaria) Daniel Trifonov	(Bulgaria) Dimitar Dimitrov	(Kazakhstan) Altynkhan Temirbek
Tashkent	Parallel Bars	(Bulgaria) Yordan Aleksandrov	(Georgia (country)) Saba Abesadze	(Kazakhstan) Emil Akhmejanov
Tashkent	Horizontal Bar	(Uzbekistan) Alisher Boysarov	(Kazakhstan) Diyas Toishybek	(Bulgaria) Daniel Trifonov
Koper	Floor Exercise	(Italy) Lorenzo Minh Casali	(Germany) Timo Eder	(Chinese Taipei) Lee Yu-Chen
Koper	Pommel Horse	(Croatia) Mateo Zugec	(Kazakhstan) Zeinolla Idrissov	(United Kingdom) Joshua Nathan
Koper	Rings	(Ukraine) Bohdan Suprun	(Italy) Simone Speranza	(Slovenia) Luka Bojanc
Koper	Vault	(Italy) Simone Speranza	(Switzerland) Luca Murabito	(Slovenia) Beno Kunst
Koper	Parallel Bars	(Israel) Ron Pyatov	(Switzerland) Mattia Piffaretti	(Ukraine) Yehor Perepolkin
Koper	Horizontal Bar	(Italy) Riccardo Villa	(Germany) Timo Eder	(Netherlands) Martijn de Veer
Szombathely	Floor Exercise	(Croatia) Aurel Benović	(Bulgaria) Dimitar Dimitrov	(Austria) Martin Miggitsch
Szombathely	Pommel Horse	(Kazakhstan) Zeinolla Idrissov	(Croatia) Mateo Žugec	(Iceland) Dagur Ólafsson
Szombathely	Rings	(Ukraine) Stasis Butrimas	(Ukraine) Oleg Verniaiev	(Finland) Elias Koski
Szombathely	Vault	(Bulgaria) Daniel Trifonov	(Czech Republic) Ondřej Kalný	(Czech Republic) Jonáš Daněk
Szombathely	Parallel Bars	(Bulgaria) Yordan Aleksandrov	(Ukraine) Oleg Verniaiev	(Luxembourg) Quentin Brandenburger
Szombathely	Horizontal Bar	(Brazil) Arthur Mariano	(Czech Republic) Tomáš Kalinič	(Poland) Kacper Garnczarek
Paris	Floor Exercise	(Israel) Artem Dolgopyat	(Slovenia) Anže Hribar	(Italy) Tommaso Brugnami
Paris	Pommel Horse	(Armenia) Hamlet Manukyan	(Italy) Gabriele Targhetta	(United States) Brandon Dang
Paris	Rings	Ilia Zaika	(Armenia) Artur Avetisyan	(Azerbaijan) Nikita Simonov
Paris	Vault	(Ukraine) Nazar Chepurnyi	Yahor Sharamkou	(Italy) Tommaso Brugnami
Paris	Parallel Bars	(Turkey) Ferhat Arıcan	(Ukraine) Nazar Chepurnyi	(United States) Crew Bold
Paris	Horizontal Bar	(United States) Cooper Kim	(Italy) Carlo Macchini	(France) Lorenzo Aymes

=== Women ===
==== World Cup series ====
Competition	Event	Gold	Silver	Bronze
Cottbus	Vault	(Individual Neutral Athletes) Anna Kalmykova	(Germany) Karina Schönmaier	(Slovenia) Teja Belak
Cottbus	Uneven Bars	(Italy) Elisa Iorio	(Individual Neutral Athletes) Milana Kaiumova	(Italy) Giulia Perotti
Cottbus	Balance Beam	(Japan) Aiko Sugihara	(Algeria) Kaylia Nemour	(Individual Neutral Athletes) Milana Kaiumova
Cottbus	Floor Exercise	(Individual Neutral Athletes) Anna Kalmykova	(Japan) Aiko Sugihara	(Italy) Emma Puato
Baku	Vault	(Individual Neutral Athletes) Anna Kalmykova	(Croatia) Tijana Korent	(Japan) Shoko Miyata
Baku	Uneven Bars	(Algeria) Kaylia Nemour	(Individual Neutral Athletes) Leila Vasileva	(Individual Neutral Athletes) Sofia Shtykhetskaya
Baku	Balance Beam	(Japan) Mana Okamura	(Algeria) Kaylia Nemour	(Japan) Shoko Miyata
Baku	Floor Exercise	(Japan) Mana Okamura	(Individual Neutral Athletes) Anna Kalmykova	(Turkey) Sevgi Kayışoğlu
Antalya	Vault	(Individual Neutral Athletes) Liudmila Roshchina	(Slovenia) Teja Belak	(Spain) Laia Font
Antalya	Uneven Bars	(Individual Neutral Athletes) Milana Kaiumova	(Individual Neutral Athletes) Liudmila Roshchina	(Slovenia) Lucija Hribar
Antalya	Balance Beam	(Individual Neutral Athletes) Milana Kaiumova	(Australia) Kate McDonald	(Australia) Breanna Scott
Antalya	Floor Exercise	(Individual Neutral Athletes) Liudmila Roshchina	(Australia) Kate McDonald	(Croatia) Antea Šikić Kaučič
Cairo	Vault	(Spain) Laia Font	(Panama) Hillary Heron	(China) Yu Linmin
Cairo	Uneven Bars	(Algeria) Kaylia Nemour	(China) Jiang Shuting	(Slovenia) Lucija Hribar
Cairo	Balance Beam	(Algeria) Kaylia Nemour	(China) Ke Qinqin	(China) Qiu Qiyuan
Cairo	Floor Exercise	(China) Ke Qinqin	(Panama) Hillary Heron	(Spain) Laia Font
Osijek	Vault	(Germany) Karina Schönmaier	(Canada) Lia Monica Fontaine	(Austria) Charlize Moerz
Osijek	Uneven Bars	(China) Yang Fanyuwei	(France) Elena Colas	(Czech Republic) Vanesa Masova
Osijek	Balance Beam	(Italy) Manila Esposito	(France) Elena Colas	(China) Tian Zhuofan
Osijek	Floor Exercise	(France) Elena Colas	(Canada) Lia Monica Fontaine (France) Maïana Prat	Not awarded

==== World Challenge Cup series ====
Competition	Event	Gold	Silver	Bronze
Varna	Vault	(Netherlands) Mara Slippens	(Liechtenstein) Julia Wessenhoffer	(Croatia) Tijana Korent
Varna	Uneven Bars	(Israel) Roni Shamay	(United Kingdom) Shantae-Eve Amankwaah	(Canada) Coralie Demers
Varna	Balance Beam	(Poland) Maria Drobniak	(Hungary) Nikolett Szilágyi	(Canada) Amy Jorgensen
Varna	Floor Exercise	(United Kingdom) Shantae-Eve Amankwaah	(United Kingdom) Grace Davies	(Netherlands) Floor Slooff
Tashkent	Vault	(Vietnam) Nguyễn Thị Quỳnh Như	(India) Pranati Nayak	(Uzbekistan) Shakhinabonu Yusufova
Tashkent	Uneven Bars	(Switzerland) Lena Bickel	(Croatia) Sofia Mešter	(Switzerland) Samira Raffin
Tashkent	Balance Beam	(Kazakhstan) Evelina Yezhova	(Croatia) Tina Zelčić	(Uzbekistan) Dildora Aripova
Tashkent	Floor Exercise	(Switzerland) Lena Bickel	(Uzbekistan) Dildora Aripova	(Uzbekistan) Solikha Tursunboeva
Koper	Vault	(Slovenia) Teja Belak	(United Kingdom) Taeja James	(Croatia) Tijana Korent
Koper	Uneven Bars	(Hungary) Zsófia Kovács	(South Africa) Caitlin Rooskrantz	(Netherlands) Sanna Veerman
Koper	Balance Beam	(Romania) Alexia Blanaru	(Croatia) Tina Zelčić	(United Kingdom) Alia Leat
Koper	Floor Exercise	(Israel) Lihie Raz	(United Kingdom) Taeja James	(United Kingdom) Alia Leat
Szombathely	Vault	(Hungary) Gréta Mayer	(United Kingdom) Emily Roper	(Czech Republic) Patricie Makovičková
Szombathely	Uneven Bars	(Brazil) Flávia Saraiva	(United States) Tatum Drusch	(Slovakia) Barbora Kundrát
Szombathely	Balance Beam	(Brazil) Flávia Saraiva	(Brazil) Rebeca Andrade	(United Kingdom) Emily Roper
Szombathely	Floor Exercise	(United States) Dulcy Caylor	(Brazil) Flávia Saraiva	(Brazil) Lorrane Oliveira
Paris	Vault	(Belgium) Lisa Vaelen	(United States) Izzy Stassi	(Norway) Christine Kubon
Paris	Uneven Bars	(France) Elena Colas	(Sweden) Emelie Westlund	Sofia Shtykhetskaya
Paris	Balance Beam	(Belgium) Naomi Descamps	(Ukraine) Diana Lobok	Varvara Belova
Paris	Floor Exercise	(France) Maïana Prat	(United States) Izzy Stassi	(Sweden) Emelie Westlund

== See also ==
- 2026 FIG Rhythmic Gymnastics World Cup series
