= 2025 in artistic gymnastics =

Below is a list of notable men's and women's artistic gymnastics international events held in 2025 as well as the medalists.

== Retirements ==
Gymnasts who announced retirements in 2025
Gymnast	Country	Date	Ref
Anastasia Ilyankova	Russia	6 January 2025	
Arthur Zanetti	Brazil	12 January 2025	
Krisztián Balázs	Hungary	20 January 2025	
Francisco Barretto Júnior	Brazil	10 February 2025	
Charlotte Booth	Great Britain	27 February 2025	
Jeremy Bischoff	United States	7 May 2025	
Ofir Netzer	Israel	11 May 2025	
Elisabeth Seitz	Germany	29 May 2025	
Andreas Toba	Germany	31 May 2025	
Zachary Clay	Canada	4 July 2025	
Nina Derwael	Belgium	15 July 2025	
Sarah Voss	Germany	30 July 2025	
Brooklyn Moors	Canada	3 August 2025	
Paul Juda	United States	9 August 2025	
Luisa Maia	Brazil	10 August 2025	
Rose-Kaying Woo	Canada	16 September 2025	
Vinzenz Höck	Austria	5 October 2025	
Jacob Karlsen	Norway	12 October 2025	
Urara Ashikawa	Japan	17 November 2025	

== Nationality changes ==
Gymnasts who changed nationalities in 2025
Gymnast	From	To	Ref
Vitaliy Guimaraes	United States	Brazil	
Tonya Paulsson	Sweden	Chinese Taipei	
Angelina Melnikova	Russia	Authorised Neutral Athletes	(Note: While not technically a nationality change, a handful of Russian gymnasts were granted AIN status, allowing them to compete internationally.)
Grigorii Klimentev	Russia	Authorised Neutral Athletes	
Vladislav Polyashov	Russia	Authorised Neutral Athletes	
Kirill Prokopev	Russia	Authorised Neutral Athletes	
Ignacio Yockers	United States	Spain	
Illia Kovtun	Ukraine	Croatia	

== Calendar of events ==
Date	Location	Event	Men's winners	Women's winners
February 20–23	(Germany) Cottbus	FIG World Cup	FX: (Kazakhstan) Milad Karimi; PH: (Chinese Taipei) Shiao Yu-jan; SR: (Armenia) Vahagn Davtyan; VT: (Armenia) Artur Davtyan; PB: (Japan) Kaito Sugimoto; HB: (Japan) Shohei Kawakami	VT: (Slovenia) Teja Belak; UB: (China) Zhang Kexin; BB: (China) Zhou Yaqin; FX: (China) Zhang Yihan
March 6–9	(Azerbaijan) Baku	FIG World Cup	FX: (Authorised Neutral Athletes) Yahor Sharamkou; PH: (United States) Brandon Dang; SR: (Azerbaijan) Nikita Simonov; VT: (Ukraine) Nazar Chepurnyi; PB: (Japan) Kazuki Matsumi; HB: (Japan) Kazuki Matsumi	VT: (Uzbekistan) Oksana Chusovitina; UB: (Authorised Neutral Athletes) Alena Tsitavets; BB: (Japan) Haruka Nakamura; FX: (Japan) Rina Kishi
March 20–23	(Turkey) Antalya	FIG World Cup	FX: (United States) Taylor Burkhart; PH: (Kazakhstan) Nariman Kurbanov; SR: (China) Lan Xingyu; VT: (Armenia) Artur Davtyan; PB: (Turkey) Ferhat Arıcan; HB: (Croatia) Tin Srbić	VT: (United States) Jayla Hang; UB: (China) Yang Fanyuwei; BB: (United States) Claire Pease; FX: (Japan) Aiko Sugihara
April 10–13	(Croatia) Osijek	FIG World Cup	FX: (Israel) Artem Dolgopyat; PH: (Armenia) Hamlet Manukyan; SR: (Turkey) Adem Asil; VT: (Croatia) Aurel Benović; PB: (Israel) Ron Pyatov; HB: (Kazakhstan) Milad Karimi	VT: (Bulgaria) Valentina Georgieva; UB: (China) Yang Fanyuwei; BB: (Netherlands) Eythora Thorsdottir; FX: (United States) Jayla Hang
April 16–19	(Qatar) Doha	FIG World Cup	FX: (Kazakhstan) Milad Karimi; PH: (Armenia) Hamlet Manukyan; SR: (China) You Hao; VT: (Armenia) Artur Davtyan; PB: (Ukraine) Nazar Chepurnyi; HB: (Kazakhstan) Milad Karimi	VT: (Slovenia) Teja Belak; UB: (Australia) Kate McDonald; BB: (Hungary) Gréta Mayer; FX: (Romania) Sabrina Voinea
April 25–28	(Egypt) Cairo	FIG World Cup	FX: (Kazakhstan) Milad Karimi; PH: (Armenia) Hamlet Manukyan; SR: (Armenia) Artur Avetisyan; VT: (Armenia) Artur Davtyan; PB: (Egypt) Omar Mohamed; HB: (Kazakhstan) Milad Karimi	VT: (Canada) Ellie Black; UB: (Algeria) Kaylia Nemour; BB: (Algeria) Kaylia Nemour; FX: (Egypt) Jana Mahmoud
May 5–11	(Bulgaria) Varna	FIG World Challenge Cup	FX: (Bulgaria) Eddie Penev; PH: (Vietnam) Đặng Ngọc Xuân Thiện; SR: (Turkey) Adem Asil; VT: (Chinese Taipei) Tseng Wei-sheng; PB: (Turkey) Ferhat Arıcan; HB: (Lithuania) Robert Tvorogal	VT: (United Kingdom) Ruby Stacey; UB: (United States) Nola Matthews; BB: (Ukraine) Marianna Kiniuk; FX: (United States) Nola Matthews
May 15–18	(Slovenia) Koper	FIG World Challenge Cup	FX: (Chinese Taipei) Chiou Min-Han; PH: (Kazakhstan) Diyas Toishybek; SR: (Turkey) İbrahim Çolak; VT: (Chinese Taipei) Tseng Wei-sheng; PB: (France) Cameron-Lie Bernard; HB: (Brazil) Lucas Bitencourt	VT: (Slovenia) Teja Belak; UB: (Slovenia) Lucija Hribar; BB: (United Kingdom) Georgia-Mae Fenton; FX: (Brazil) Julia Coutinho
May 26–31	(Germany) Leipzig	European Championships	TF: Great Britain; AA: (Turkey) Adem Asil; FX: (United Kingdom) Luke Whitehouse; PH: (Armenia) Hamlet Manukyan; SR: (Turkey) Adem Asil / (Greece) Eleftherios Petrounias; VT: (Armenia) Artur Davtyan; PB: (Germany) Nils Dunkel; HB: (Lithuania) Robert Tvorogal	TF: Italy; AA: (Italy) Manila Esposito; VT: (Germany) Karina Schönmaier; UB: (Belgium) Nina Derwael; BB: (Belgium) Nina Derwael; FX: (Romania) Ana Bărbosu
May 26–31	(Germany) Leipzig	European Championships	Mixed Team: Germany	
June 5–8	(South Korea) Jecheon	Asian Championships	TF: Japan; AA: (Japan) Shinnosuke Oka; FX: (Philippines) Carlos Yulo; PH: (Kazakhstan) Nariman Kurbanov; SR: (China) Lan Xingyu; VT: (Iran) Mahdi Olfati; PB: (Japan) Shinnosuke Oka; HB: (Chinese Taipei) Tang Chia-hung	—N/a
June 12–15	(South Korea) Jecheon	Asian Championships	—N/a	TF: China; AA: (Japan) Aiko Sugihara; VT: Zhang Yihan; UB: Qin Xinyi; BB: (South Korea) Hwang Seo-hyun; FX: Zhou Yaqin
June 12–15	Panama City	Pan American Championships	TF: United States; AA: (Canada) Félix Dolci; FX: (United States) Jun Iwai; PH: (United States) Brandon Dang; SR: (Argentina) Daniel Villafañe; VT: (Canada) Félix Dolci; PB: (Canada) Félix Dolci; HB: (Canada) Félix Dolci	TF: United States; AA: (United States) Jayla Hang; VT: (Panama) Karla Navas; UB: (United States) Gabrielle Hardie; BB: (Canada) Lia Redick; FX: (Canada) Lia Monica Fontaine
June 18–21	(Uzbekistan) Tashkent	FIG World Challenge Cup	FX: (Uzbekistan) Abdulaziz Mirvaliev; PH: (Armenia) Mamikon Khachatryan; SR: (Uzbekistan) Akhrorkhon Temirkhonov; VT: (Uzbekistan) Abdulaziz Mirvaliev; PB: (Uzbekistan) Akhrorkhon Temirkhonov; HB: (Turkey) Mert Efe Kılıçer	VT: (Bulgaria) Valentina Georgieva; UB: (Algeria) Kaylia Nemour; BB: (Algeria) Kaylia Nemour; FX: (Croatia) Antea Šikić Kaučič
July 20–26	(Croatia) Osijek	European Youth Olympic Festival	TF: Great Britain; AA: (United Kingdom) Evan McPhillips; FX: (United Kingdom) Evan McPhillips; PH: (Germany) Nikita Prohorov / (Switzerland) Ben Schumacher; SR: (United Kingdom) Uzair Chowdhury; VT: (Republic of Ireland) Chester Enríquez; PB: (United Kingdom) Uzair Chowdhury; HB: (Italy) Pietro Mazzola	TF: France; AA: (France) Elena Colas; VT: (Italy) Mia Proietti; UB: (France) Elena Colas; BB: (France) Elena Colas; FX: (France) Maïana Prat
July 22–26	(Germany) Rhine-Ruhr	World University Games	TF: Japan; AA: (Japan) Daiki Hashimoto; FX: (United Kingdom) Luke Whitehouse; PH: (Armenia) Hamlet Manukyan; SR: (China) Liu Hengyu; VT: (China) Chen Zhilong; PB: (Japan) Tomoharu Tsunogai; HB: (Canada) Félix Dolci	TF: Japan; AA: (Japan) Shoko Miyata; VT: (Japan) Shoko Miyata; UB: (China) Yang Fanyuwei; BB: (Japan) Urara Ashikawa; FX: (Japan) Shoko Miyata
August 18–22	(Paraguay) Asunción	Junior Pan American Games	TF: United States; AA: (Colombia) Thomas Mejía; FX: (Canada) Thomas Tittley; PH: (Brazil) Pedro Silvestre; SR: (Mexico) Lorenzo Zaragoza; VT: (Colombia) Camilo Vera; PB: (Colombia) Jorman Álvarez / (Colombia) Camilo Vera; HB: (Colombia) Camilo Vera	TF: United States; AA: (United States) Charleigh Bullock; VT: (United States) Addalye VanGrinsven; UB: (United States) Charleigh Bullock; BB: (United States) Charleigh Bullock; FX: (United States) Charleigh Bullock
September 13–14	(France) Paris	FIG World Challenge Cup	FX: (Israel) Artem Dolgopyat; PH: (Kazakhstan) Nariman Kurbanov; SR: (Belgium) Glen Cuyle; VT: (Italy) Thomas Grasso; PB: (United Kingdom) Joe Fraser; HB: (Italy) Carlo Macchini	VT: (United Kingdom) Abigail Martin; UB: (Algeria) Kaylia Nemour; BB: (Authorised Neutral Athletes) Angelina Melnikova; FX: (Romania) Sabrina Voinea
September 26–28	(Hungary) Szombathely	FIG World Challenge Cup	FX: (Kazakhstan) Dmitriy Patanin; PH: (Turkey) Ferhat Arıcan; SR: (Turkey) Mehmet Ayberk Koşak; VT: (Cyprus) Neofytos Kyriakou; PB: (Turkey) Ferhat Arıcan; HB: (Kazakhstan) Milad Karimi	VT: (Austria) Charlize Moerz; UB: (Hungary) Zója Székely; BB: (Brazil) Flavia Saraiva; FX: (Romania) Denisa Golgotă
October 19–25	(Indonesia) Jakarta	World Championships	AA: (Japan) Daiki Hashimoto; FX: (United Kingdom) Jake Jarman; PH: (China) Hong Yanming; SR: (United States) Donnell Whittenburg; VT: (Philippines) Carlos Yulo; PB: (China) Zou Jingyuan; HB: (United States) Brody Malone	AA: (Individual Neutral Athletes) Angelina Melnikova; VT: (Individual Neutral Athletes) Angelina Melnikova; UB: (Algeria) Kaylia Nemour; BB: (China) Zhang Qingying; FX: (Japan) Aiko Sugihara
November 8–9	(Colombia) Medellín	South American Championships	TF: Chile; AA: (Chile) Luciano Letelier; FX: (Chile) Ignacio Varas; PH: (Chile) Luciano Letelier; SR: (Chile) Diego Espejo; VT: (Colombia) Juan Larrahondo; PB: (Venezuela) Adickxon Trejo; HB: (Chile) Luciano Letelier	TF: Brazil; AA: (Argentina) Sira Macías; VT: (Argentina) Lucía González; UB: (Argentina) Meline Mesropian; BB: (Brazil) Gabriela Barbosa; FX: (Argentina) Sira Macías
November 20–24	(Philippines) Manila	Junior World Championships	TF: China; AA: (Individual Neutral Athletes) Arsenii Dukhno; FX: (China) Yang Lanbin; PH: (China) Zheng Ao; SR: (United States) Dante Reive; VT: (Individual Neutral Athletes) Arsenii Dukhno; PB: (Colombia) Camilo Vera / (Japan) Nao Ojima; HB: (Colombia) Camilo Vera	TF: France; AA: (Japan) Yume Minamino; VT: (United States) Lavi Crain; UB: (Individual Neutral Athletes) Milana Kaiumova; BB: (China) Xiang Yina; FX: (Japan) Misa Nishiyama
November 27–29	(Peru) Lima	Bolivarian Games	TF: Colombia; AA: (Chile) Joel Álvarez; FX: (Colombia) Juan Larrahondo; PH: (Guatemala) Jaycko Bourdet; SR: (Chile) Diego Espejo; VT: (Colombia) Juan Larrahondo; PB: (Colombia) Yan Zabala; HB: (Colombia) Yan Zabala	TF: Panama; AA: (Panama) Alyiah Lide de León; VT: (Panama) Karla Navas; UB: (Ecuador) Alais Perea; BB: (Peru) Fabiola Díaz; FX: (Peru) Fabiola Díaz
December 9–20	Thailand	Southeast Asian Games	FX: (Thailand) Tikumporn Surintornta; PH: (Vietnam) Dang Ngoc Xuan Thien; SR: (Vietnam) Nguyen Van Khanh Phong; VT: (Malaysia) Muhammad Sharul Aimy / (Philippines) John Ivan Cruz; PB: (Vietnam) Đinh Phương Thành; HB: (Indonesia) Abiyurafi / (Thailand) Weerapat Chuaisom	VT: (Philippines) Aleah Finnegan; UB: (Malaysia) Rachel Yeoh Li Wen; BB: (Malaysia) Kang Xian Yeap; FX: (Thailand) Sasiwimon Mueangphuan

== Medalists ==
=== Women ===
==== International events ====
Competition	Event	Gold	Silver	Bronze
World Championships	All-Around	(Individual Neutral Athletes) Angelina Melnikova	(United States) Leanne Wong	(China) Zhang Qingying
World Championships	Vault	(Individual Neutral Athletes) Angelina Melnikova	(Canada) Lia Monica Fontaine	(United States) Joscelyn Roberson
World Championships	Uneven Bars	(Algeria) Kaylia Nemour	(Individual Neutral Athletes) Angelina Melnikova	(China) Yang Fanyuwei
World Championships	Balance Beam	(China) Zhang Qingying	(Algeria) Kaylia Nemour	(Japan) Aiko Sugihara
World Championships	Floor Exercise	(Japan) Aiko Sugihara	(United Kingdom) Ruby Evans	(United Kingdom) Abigail Martin
Junior World Championships	Team	France	Japan	United States
Junior World Championships	All-Around	(Japan) Yume Minamino	(France) Elena Colas	(Japan) Misa Nishiyama
Junior World Championships	Vault	(United States) Lavi Crain	(Japan) Misa Nishiyama	(Romania) Alexia Blanaru
Junior World Championships	Uneven Bars	(Individual Neutral Athletes) Milana Kaiumova	(Slovakia) Lucia Piliarová	(United States) Caroline Moreau
Junior World Championships	Balance Beam	(China) Xiang Yina	(Japan) Yume Minamino	(United States) Caroline Moreau
Junior World Championships	Floor Exercise	(Japan) Misa Nishiyama	(France) Elena Colas	(France) Maïana Prat

==== Regional championships ====
Competition	Event	Gold	Silver	Bronze
Asian	Team	China	Japan	South Korea
Asian	All-Around	(Japan) Aiko Sugihara	(Japan) Haruka Nakamura	(China) Qin Xinyi
Asian	Vault	(China) Zhang Yihan	(Vietnam) Nguyễn Thị Quỳnh Như	(India) Pranati Nayak
Asian	Uneven Bars	(China) Qin Xinyi	(Japan) Haruka Nakamura	(China) Zhang Yihan
Asian	Balance Beam	(South Korea) Hwang Seo-hyun	(Japan) Aiko Sugihara	(China) Zhou Yaqin
Asian	Floor Exercise	(China) Zhou Yaqin	(Japan) Aiko Sugihara	(Japan) Haruka Nakamura
European	Team	Italy	Germany	France
European	All-Around	(Italy) Manila Esposito	(Spain) Alba Petisco	(Romania) Ana Bărbosu
European	Vault	(Germany) Karina Schönmaier	(Bulgaria) Valentina Georgieva	(Belgium) Lisa Vaelen
European	Uneven Bars	(Belgium) Nina Derwael	(Hungary) Bettina Lili Czifra	(Romania) Ana Bărbosu
European	Balance Beam	(Belgium) Nina Derwael	(Romania) Ana Bărbosu	(Italy) Sofia Tonelli
European	Floor Exercise	(Romania) Ana Bărbosu	(Italy) Manila Esposito	(Spain) Alba Petisco
Pan American	Team	United States	Canada	Brazil
Pan American	All-Around	(United States) Jayla Hang	(Canada) Lia Monica Fontaine	(United States) Hezly Rivera
Pan American	Vault	(Panama) Karla Navas	(Canada) Lia Monica Fontaine	(United States) Jayla Hang
Pan American	Uneven Bars	(United States) Gabrielle Hardie	(United States) Jayla Hang	(Canada) Lia Monica Fontaine
Pan American	Balance Beam	(Canada) Lia Redick	(United States) Jayla Hang	(United States) Hezly Rivera
Pan American	Floor Exercise	(Canada) Lia Monica Fontaine	(United States) Jayla Hang	(United States) Gabrielle Hardie

=== Men ===
==== International events ====
Competition	Event	Gold	Silver	Bronze
World Championships	All-Around	(Japan) Daiki Hashimoto	(China) Zhang Boheng	(Switzerland) Noe Seifert
World Championships	Floor Exercise	(United Kingdom) Jake Jarman	(United Kingdom) Luke Whitehouse	(Philippines) Carlos Yulo
World Championships	Pommel Horse	(China) Hong Yanming	(Armenia) Mamikon Khachatryan	(United States) Patrick Hoopes
World Championships	Rings	(United States) Donnell Whittenburg	(Turkey) Adem Asil	(China) Lan Xingyu
World Championships	Vault	(Philippines) Carlos Yulo	(Armenia) Artur Davtyan	(Ukraine) Nazar Chepurnyi
World Championships	Parallel Bars	(China) Zou Jingyuan	(Japan) Tomoharu Tsunogai	(Individual Neutral Athletes) Daniel Marinov
World Championships	Horizontal Bar	(United States) Brody Malone	(Japan) Daiki Hashimoto	(United Kingdom) Joe Fraser
Junior World Championships	Team	China	Japan	United States
Junior World Championships	All-Around	(Individual Neutral Athletes) Arsenii Dukhno	(Japan) Nao Ojima	(China) Yang Lanbin
Junior World Championships	Floor Exercise	(China) Yang Lanbin	(Italy) Simone Speranza	(Philippines) Eldrew Yulo
Junior World Championships	Pommel Horse	(China) Zheng Ao	(France) Leeroy Traore-Malatre	(Japan) Nao Ojima
Junior World Championships	Rings	(United States) Dante Reive	(Italy) Simone Speranza	(China) Wang Chengcheng
Junior World Championships	Vault	(Individual Neutral Athletes) Arsenii Dukhno	(United Kingdom) Sol Scott	(United Kingdom) Evan McPhillips
Junior World Championships	Parallel Bars	(Colombia) Camilo Vera (Japan) Nao Ojima	Not awarded	(China) Yang Lanbin (United States) Danila Leykin
Junior World Championships	Horizontal Bar	(Colombia) Camilo Vera	(United States) Danila Leykin	(Philippines) Eldrew Yulo

==== Regional championships ====
Competition	Event	Gold	Silver	Bronze
Asian	Team	Japan	China	Kazakhstan
Asian	All-Around	(Japan) Shinnosuke Oka	(Japan) Tsuyoshi Hasegawa	(Philippines) Carlos Yulo
Asian	Floor Exercise	(Philippines) Carlos Yulo	(Kazakhstan) Milad Karimi	(South Korea) Moon Geonyoung
Asian	Pommel Horse	(Kazakhstan) Nariman Kurbanov	(South Korea) Hur Woong	(Vietnam) Đặng Ngọc Xuân Thiện
Asian	Rings	(China) Lan Xingyu	(China) Yang Haonan	(Iran) Siavash Siahi
Asian	Vault	(Iran) Mahdi Olfati	(China) Huang Mingqi	(Philippines) Carlos Yulo
Asian	Parallel Bars	(Japan) Shinnosuke Oka	(Japan) Tomoharu Tsunogai	(Philippines) Carlos Yulo
Asian	Horizontal Bar	(Chinese Taipei) Tang Chia-hung	(Japan) Tomoharu Tsunogai	(China) Tian Hao
European	Team	Great Britain	Switzerland	Italy
European	All-Around	(Turkey) Adem Asil	(France) Léo Saladino	(Hungary) Krisztofer Mészáros
European	Floor Exercise	(United Kingdom) Luke Whitehouse	(United Kingdom) Harry Hepworth	(Italy) Lorenzo Minh Casali
European	Pommel Horse	(Armenia) Hamlet Manukyan	(Armenia) Mamikon Khachatryan	(Italy) Gabriele Targhetta
European	Rings	(Turkey) Adem Asil (Greece) Eleftherios Petrounias	none awarded	(Armenia) Artur Avetisyan
European	Vault	(Armenia) Artur Davtyan	(United Kingdom) Jake Jarman	(Ukraine) Nazar Chepurnyi
European	Parallel Bars	(Germany) Nils Dunkel	(Switzerland) Ian Raubal	(Germany) Timo Eder
European	Horizontal Bar	(Lithuania) Robert Tvorogal	(Germany) Andreas Toba	(France) Anthony Mansard
Pan American	Team	United States	Canada	Argentina
Pan American	All-Around	(Canada) Félix Dolci	(United States) Joshua Karnes	(Brazil) Diogo Soares
Pan American	Floor Exercise	(United States) Jun Iwai	(Guatemala) Jorge Vega	(Cuba) Diorges Escobar
Pan American	Pommel Horse	(United States) Brandon Dang	(United States) Joshua Karnes	(Jamaica) Elel Wahrmann-Baker
Pan American	Rings	(Argentina) Daniel Villafañe	(Puerto Rico) Francisco Vélez	(Puerto Rico) José López
Pan American	Vault	(Canada) Félix Dolci	(Puerto Rico) José López	(Guatemala) Jorge Vega
Pan American	Parallel Bars	(Canada) Félix Dolci	(Brazil) Diogo Soares	(Canada) Evgeny Siminiuc
Pan American	Horizontal Bar	(Canada) Félix Dolci	(United States) Joshua Karnes	(Canada) Evgeny Siminiuc

== Season's best international scores ==
Note: Only the scores of senior gymnasts from international events have been included below. Only one score per gymnast is included.

=== Women ===
==== Individual all-around ====
Rank	Name	Country	Score	Event
1	Manila Esposito	Italy	55.750	City of Jesolo Trophy AA
2	Jayla Hang	United States	55.666	Pan American Championships TF
3	Shoko Miyata	Japan	55.150	Summer World University Games TF
4	Angelina Melnikova	(Individual Neutral Athletes) Authorized Neutral Athletes	55.066	World Championships AA
5	Leanne Wong	United States	54.966	World Championships AA
6	Hezly Rivera	United States	54.766	Pan American Championships TF
7	Aiko Sugihara	Japan	54.765	Asian Championships AA
8	Zhang Qingying	China	54.633	World Championships AA
9	Kaylia Nemour	Algeria	54.564	World Championships AA
10	Ashlee Sullivan	United States	54.550	DTB Mixed Cup
11	Haruka Nakamura	Japan	54.065	Asian Championships AA
12	Lia Monica Fontaine	Canada	53.966	Pan American Championships AA
13	Ana Bărbosu	Romania	53.933	European Championships QF
14	Helen Kevric	Germany	53.932	European Championships QF
15	Claire Pease	United States	53.800	City of Jesolo Trophy AA
16	Qin Xinyi	China	53.599	Asian Championships AA
17	Asia D'Amato	Italy	53.532	World Championships AA
18	Simone Rose	United States	53.500	City of Jesolo Trophy AA
19	Sofia Tonelli	Italy	53.332	European Championships QF
20	Alba Petisco	Spain	53.265	European Championships AA

==== Vault ====
Rank	Name	Country	Score	Event
1	Angelina Melnikova	(Individual Neutral Athletes) Authorized Neutral Athletes	14.499	World Championships QF
2	Karla Navas	Panama	14.334	Pan American Championships EF
3	Deng Yalan	China	14.250	World Championships QF
4	Lia Monica Fontaine	Canada	14.200	Pan American Championships EF
5	Valentina Georgieva	Bulgaria	14.149	Osijek World Cup EF
6	Yu Linmin	China	14.066	Osijek World Cup EF
7	Karina Schönmaier	Germany	14.049	World Championships QF
7	Abigail Martin	Great Britain	14.049	Paris World Challenge Cup QF
9	Joscelyn Roberson	United States	13.983	World Championships EF
10	Anna Kalmykova	(Individual Neutral Athletes) Authorized Neutral Athletes	13.916	World Championships QF

==== Uneven bars ====
Rank	Name	Country	Score	Event
1	Kaylia Nemour	Algeria	15.566	World Championships EF
2	Yang Fanyuwei	China	15.000	Summer World University Games EF
3	Helen Kevric	Germany	14.766	European Championships QF
4	Angelina Melnikova	(Individual Neutral Athletes) Authorized Neutral Athletes	14.700	World Championships AA
5	Nina Derwael	Belgium	14.466	European Championships EF
6	Kate McDonald	Australia	14.350	Summer World University Games TF
7	Skye Blakely	United States	14.333	World Championships EF
8	Zhang Yihan	China	14.266	Asian Championships QF
9	Simone Rose	United States	14.250	City of Jesolo Trophy EF
10	Tian Zhuofan	China	14.233	Antalya World Cup QF
10	Claire Pease	United States	14.233	Antalya World Cup EF

==== Balance beam ====
Rank	Name	Country	Score	Event
1	Zhou Yaqin	China	15.233	Asian Championships QF
2	Zhang Qingying	China	15.166	World Championships EF
3	Manila Esposito	Italy	14.700	City of Jesolo Trophy EF
4	Kaylia Nemour	Algeria	14.650	Tashkent World Challenge Cup QF
5	Hwang Seo-hyun	South Korea	14.633	Asian Championships EF
6	Jennifer Williams	Sweden	14.500	European Championships QF
7	Mana Okamura	Japan	14.400	Summer World University Games TF
8	Zhang Xinyi	China	14.333	Asian Championships QF
9	Zhang Kexin	China	14.266	Cottbus World Cup EF
10	Flávia Saraiva	Brazil	14.250	Szombathely World Challenge Cup QF

==== Floor exercise ====
Rank	Name	Country	Score	Event
1	Manila Esposito	Italy	14.500	City of Jesolo Trophy QF
2	Aiko Sugihara	Japan	14.133	Asian Championships QF
3	Ana Bărbosu	Romania	13.833	European Championships EF
4	Lia Monica Fontaine	Canada	13.800	Pan American Championships EF
4	Sabrina Voinea	Romania	13.800	Paris World Challenge Cup EF
6	Jayla Hang	United States	13.767	Pan American Championships QF
7	Ashlee Sullivan	United States	13.750	DTB Pokal Mixed Cup
7	Emma Fioravanti	Italy	13.750	City of Jesolo Trophy QF
9	Zhou Yaqin	China	13.733	Asian Championships EF
10	Shoko Miyata	Japan	13.700	Summer World University Games EF
