= Milana Kaiumova =

Russian artistic gymnast

- Милана Каюмова
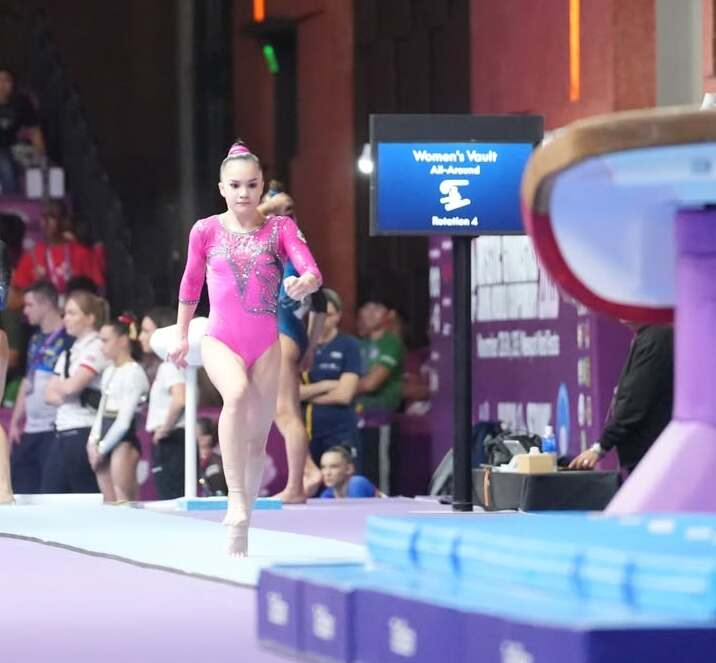
- Kaiumova at the 2025 Junior World Championships

Personal information
- Full name: Milana Iliosovna Kaiumova
- Born: 26 September 2010 (age 16) Saint Petersburg, Russia

Gymnastics career
- Discipline: Women's artistic gymnastics
- Country represented: Russia; (2023–present)
Medal record
Representing Russia & (Individual Neutral Athletes) AIN
Junior World Championships
Gold medal – first place	2025 Manila	Uneven bars
FIG World Cup
Event / 1st / 2nd / 3rd; Apparatus World Cup / 2 / 1 / 1

Milana Iliosovna Kaiumova (Russian: Милана Ильёсовна Каюмова; born 26 September 2010) is a Russian artistic gymnast. She is the 2025 Junior World Champion on the uneven bars.

== Gymnastics career ==
=== 2023–2025 ===
Kauimova competed at the 2023 Russian Junior Championships in the espoir division where she placed sixth in the all-around and won silver on balance beam. The following year she won silver in the all-around at the Russian Junior Championships and additionally won silvers on the uneven bars and floor exercise.

Starting in 2025 the Artistic Gymnastics Federation of Russia began letting their athletes to apply for neutral status, allowing them to return to international competition. In late November of that year, Kauimova competed at the 2025 Junior World Championships where she qualified to the all-around and uneven bars finals. During the all-around final she finished sixth. During the uneven bars final Kaiumova won gold, becoming the second Russian to win the title after Vladislava Urazova did so in 2019, although Kaiumova's title is not attributed to Russia due to her competing as an neutral athlete.

=== 2026 ===
Kauimova became age-eligible for senior level competition in 2026. She made her senior international debut at the Cottbus World Cup where she won silver on uneven bars behind Elisa Iorio and bronze on balance beam behind Aiko Sugihara and Kaylia Nemour.

Kaiumova was originally selected as the traveling alternate for the team for the 2026 World Championships. However, three days before the official start date of the competition, the Netherlands denied visas for Angelina Melnikova, Viktoria Listunova, and Anna Kalmykova. Kaiumova's visa was granted along with those of Liudmila Roshchina, Alyona Glotova, and Elizaveta Us.

== Competitive history ==
Competitive history of Milana Kaiumova
Year	Event	Team	AA	VT	UB	BB	FX
2023	Russian Junior Championships		6	7	5	2nd place, silver medalist(s)	5
2024	Russian Junior Championships		2nd place, silver medalist(s)		2nd place, silver medalist(s)	5	2nd place, silver medalist(s)
2024	Belarus Open Cup	1st place, gold medalist(s)	1st place, gold medalist(s)		1st place, gold medalist(s)	6	3rd place, bronze medalist(s)
2025	Russian Junior Championships	1st place, gold medalist(s)	1st place, gold medalist(s)		1st place, gold medalist(s)	1st place, gold medalist(s)	2nd place, silver medalist(s)
2025	Strongest Athletes Cup				1st place, gold medalist(s)		
2025	Junior World Championships		6		1st place, gold medalist(s)		
2026	Cottbus World Cup				2nd place, silver medalist(s)	3rd place, bronze medalist(s)	
2026	Antalya World Cup				1st place, gold medalist(s)	1st place, gold medalist(s)	
2026	Spartakiade	4	2nd place, silver medalist(s)		3rd place, bronze medalist(s)	5	1st place, gold medalist(s)
2026	World Championships	6					
