= Danila Leykin =

American gymnast (born 2007)

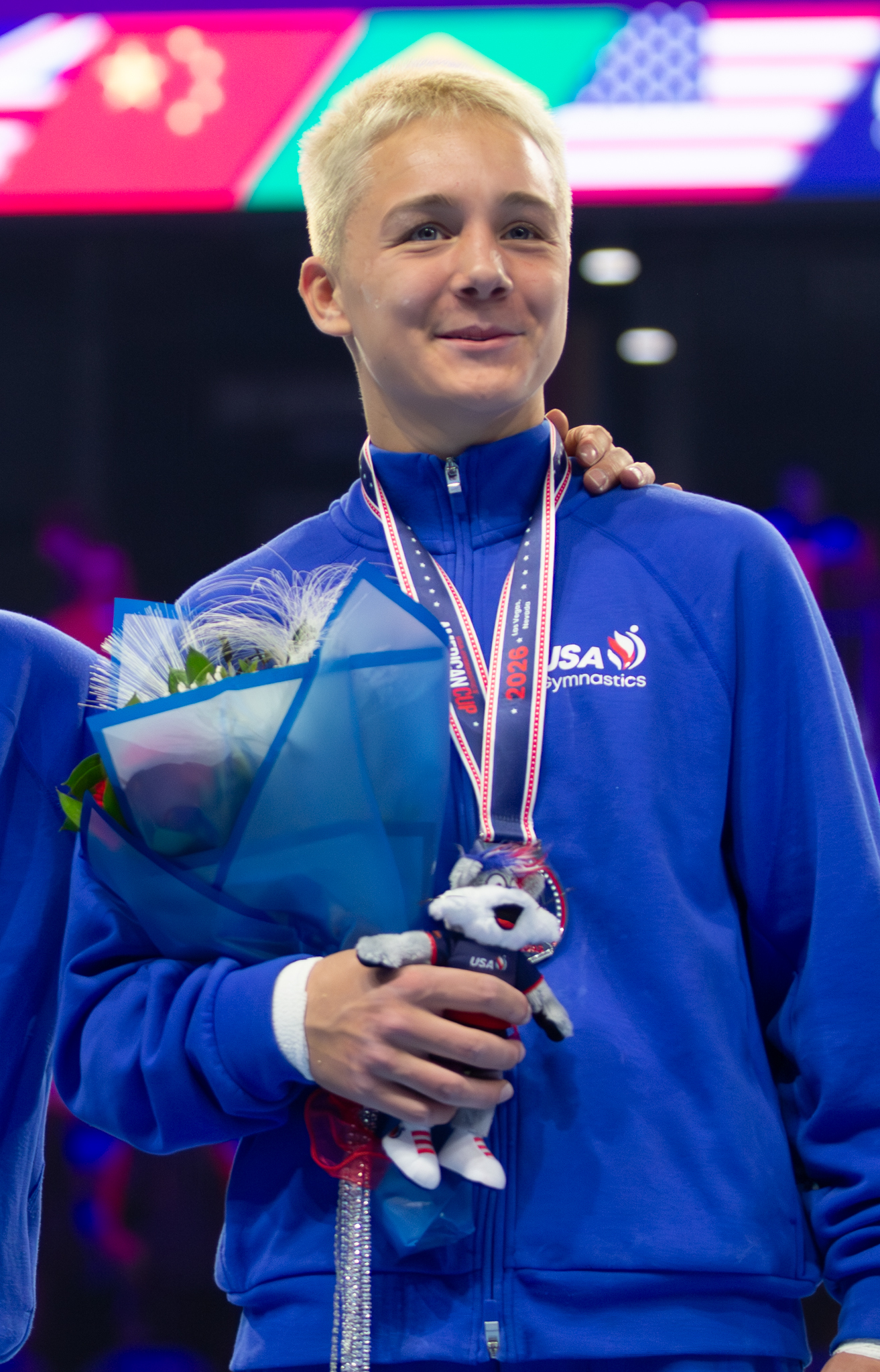
- Leykin at the 2026 American Cup

Personal information
- Born: June 28, 2007 (age 19) Nevada, U.S.
- Relatives: Leonid Leykin (father)

Gymnastics career
- Discipline: Men's artistic gymnastics
- Country represented: United States; (2026–present)
- Training location: Sarasota, Florida, U.S.
- Club: EVO Gymnastics
- Head coach: Sam Mikulak
Medal record
Men's artistic gymnastics
Representing United States
Junior World Championships
Silver medal – second place	2025 Manila	Horizontal bar
Bronze medal – third place	2025 Manila	Team
Bronze medal – third place	2025 Manila	Parallel bars

Danila Leykin (born June 28, 2007) is an American artistic gymnast. He is a three-time medalist at the 2025 Junior World Championships.

== Early life ==
Leykin was born in Nevada in 2007 to Evgeniya Golovach, a former Russian junior national team gymnast, and Leonid Leykin, a Russian actor and clown. He has an older half sister from his father's first marriage and a younger brother, Luca, who is also in gymnastics. In 2009, his family moved back to Russia where he began training gymnastics. A few years later Leykin, his mother, and his brother moved back to Las Vegas while his father remained in Russia. When Leykin was nine, they moved to Texas so he could train under Sergei Pakanich, who was coaching Asher Hong. When Pakanich moved to Sarasota, Florida to coach at EVO Gymnastics, Leykin and his family followed.

== Gymnastics career ==
=== 2023–2024 ===
Leykin competed at the 2023 DTB Pokal Team Challenge where he helped the United States win team gold in the junior division. Individually, he won gold on parallel bars. At the 2023 U.S. National Championships, he placed second in the all-around behind Nathan Roman in the 15–16 age division.

Leykin competed at the 2024 Pacific Rim Championships where he won gold with Team USA. Individually, he won silver in a four-way-tie on pommel horse and won bronze on horizontal bar. While competing at the 2024 U.S. National Championships, he suffered a hand injury while competing on the parallel bars and withdrew from the remainder of the competition.

=== 2025 ===
In 2025, Leykin became age-eligible for senior-level competition but opted to compete as a junior in international competitions while competing in the senior level domestically. At the 2025 Winter Cup, on the first day of competition Leykin scored a 76.400 in the all-around. On the second day of competition, Leykin only competed on pommel horse, parallel bars, and horizontal bar, finishing thirteenth, eleventh, and sixth respectively.

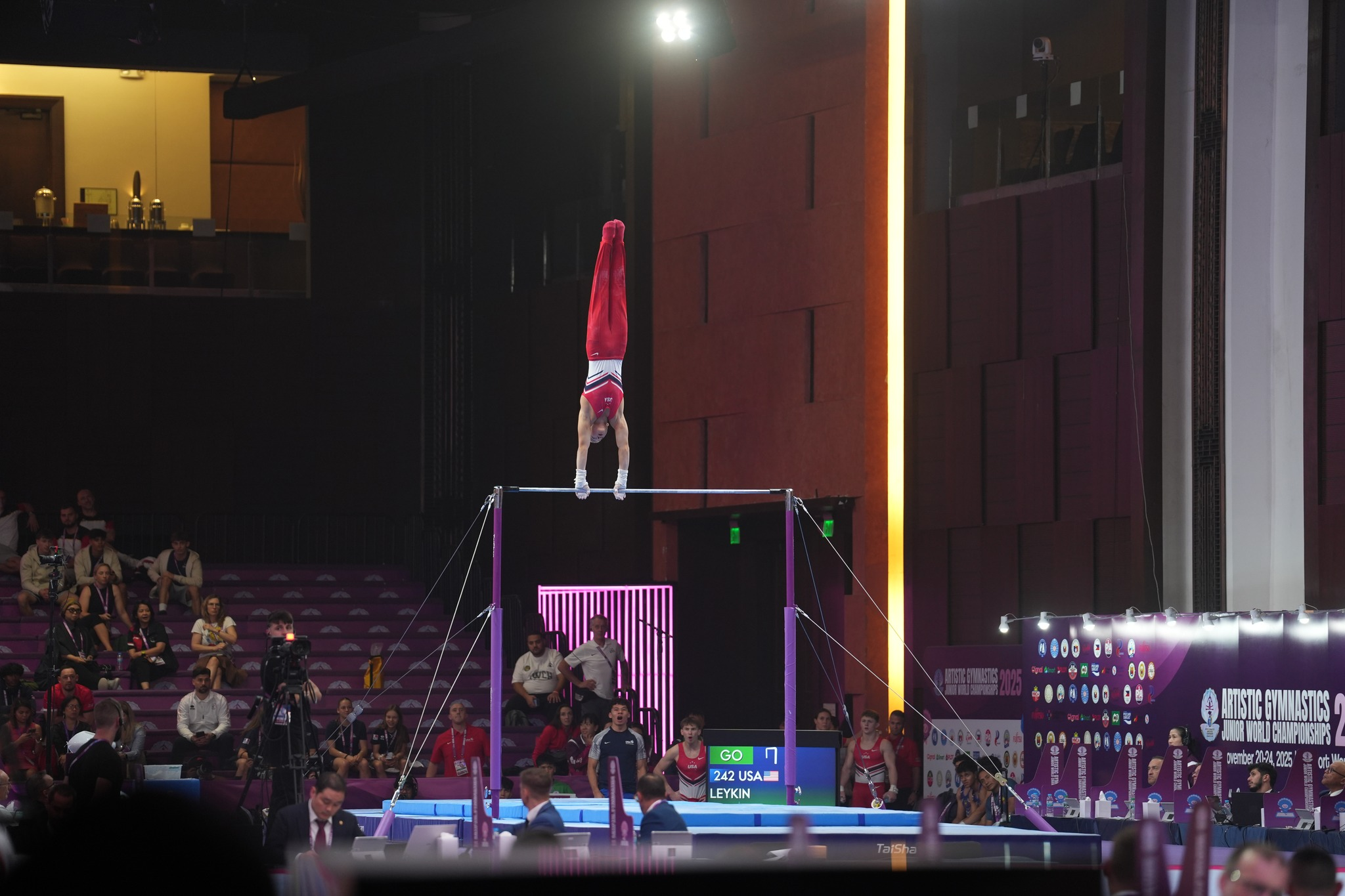
Leykin at the 2025 Junior World Championships

He was selected to compete at the 2025 DTB Pokal Team Challenge, where he helped the USA win team silver, and individually he won gold on horizontal bar and bronze on the parallel bars. Additionally he placed fourth on vault. At the 2025 U.S. National Championships, he placed tenth in the all-around. At the end of the competition, he was named to the Senior Men's Development Team and was selected to represent the United States at the 2025 Junior World Championships alongside Dante Reive, Nathan Roman, and alternate Maksim Kan.

At the 2025 Junior World Championships, Leykin helped the United States win the bronze medal, their first ever team medal at the Junior World Championships. During the all-around final, he placed fourth, the highest placement an American male has achieved at this competition. During event finals, he won silver on horizontal bar behind Camilo Vera and co-won bronze on parallel bars alongside Yang Lanbin and behind Vera and Nao Ojima.

=== 2026 ===
At the 2026 Winter Cup, Leykin won gold on horizontal bar. He was selected to represent the United States at the 2026 American Cup alongside Yul Moldauer, Asher Hong, Hezly Rivera, Claire Pease, and Charleigh Bullock. At the competition Leykin competed on horizontal bar and parallel bars, helping the United States win silver behind China. Leykin next competed at the 2026 DTB Pokal Team Challenge where he helped the United States win gold; individually he placed sixth on the horizontal bar.

Leykin competed at the 2026 National Championships where he placed third in the all-around behind Fred Richard and Shane Wiskus. At the conclusion of the competition, he was selected to compete at the 2026 World Championships alongside Richard, Wiskus, Patrick Hoopes, Kameron Nelson, and alternate Moldauer. At the competition, Leykin helped the United States finish sixth as a team. Individually he qualified to the all-around final where he finished twelfth.

Leykin competing at the 2026 U.S. National Championships

== Competitive history ==
Competitive history of Danila Leykin
Year	Event	Team	AA	FX	PH	SR	VT	PB	HB
2023	DTB Pokal Team Challenge	1st place, gold medalist(s)						1st place, gold medalist(s)	
2023	U.S. National Championships		2nd place, silver medalist(s)	8	1st place, gold medalist(s)	4	9	2nd place, silver medalist(s)	1st place, gold medalist(s)
2024	Elite Team Cup	2nd place, silver medalist(s)							
2024	Winter Cup							7	1st place, gold medalist(s)
2024	Pacific Rim Championships	1st place, gold medalist(s)			2nd place, silver medalist(s)			7	3rd place, bronze medalist(s)
2024	U.S. National Championships		WD						
2025	Winter Cup				13			11	6
2025	DTB Pokal Team Challenge	2nd place, silver medalist(s)					4	3rd place, bronze medalist(s)	1st place, gold medalist(s)
2025	U.S. National Championships		10						
2025	Junior World Championships	3rd place, bronze medalist(s)	4	6				3rd place, bronze medalist(s)	2nd place, silver medalist(s)
2026	Winter Cup			11	11			5	1st place, gold medalist(s)
2026	American Cup	2nd place, silver medalist(s)							
2026	DTB Pokal Team Challenge	1st place, gold medalist(s)							6
2026	U.S. National Championships		3rd place, bronze medalist(s)	21	4	18		3rd place, bronze medalist(s)	2nd place, silver medalist(s)
2026	World Championships	6	12						
