= Camilo Vera =

Colombian gymnast

- Full name: Keynher Camilo Vera Carrascal
- Born: 28 February 2007 (age 19) Cúcuta, Colombia

Gymnastics career
- Discipline: Men's artistic gymnastics
- Country represented: Colombia; (2018–present)
- Club: Liga Norte de Santander
- Head coach: Jairo Ruiz
Medal record
Representing Colombia
Men's artistic gymnastics
Pan American Championships
Gold medal – first place	2026 Rio de Janeiro	All-around
Gold medal – first place	2026 Rio de Janeiro	Vault
Silver medal – second place	2026 Rio de Janeiro	Team
Central American and Caribbean Games
Gold medal – first place	2026 Santo Domingo	Team
Silver medal – second place	2026 Santo Domingo	All-around
Silver medal – second place	2026 Santo Domingo	Floor exercise
Silver medal – second place	2026 Santo Domingo	Pommel horse
Silver medal – second place	2026 Santo Domingo	Vault
Junior World Championships
Gold medal – first place	2025 Manila	Parallel bars
Gold medal – first place	2025 Manila	Horizontal bar

Keynher Camilo Vera Carrascal (born February 28, 2007) is a Colombian artistic gymnast. He is the 2026 Pan American all-around and vault champion. He is also the 2025 Junior World Champion on parallel bars and horizontal bar.

== Early life ==
Vera was born in Cúcuta, Norte de Santander. He has two siblings, Jhan Carlos and Dana, who are judokas. He began training in gymnastics under Jairo Ruiz and alongside Ángel Barajas. For a brief period when Vera was 11, his family moved to a farm in Catatumbo, where he and his siblings trained in a makeshift gym built with sticks, cement, and bricks in a corner of their family farm. His family moved back to Cúcuta due to the ongoing guerrilla violence in the region.

== Gymnastics career ==
Vera competed at the 2022 Pan American Championships, where he helped Colombia finish fourth as a team. Individually, he won gold on pommel horse and parallel bars and won bronze in the all-around behind Fred Richard and Ángel Barajas.

In early 2023, Vera suffered a spinal injury that required him to undergo stem cell treatment in Bogotá.

At the 2023 Junior South American Championships, he helped Colombia win team gold, and individually he won gold in the all-around and on floor exercise, rings, and horizontal bar.

In early 2024, Vera competed at the inaugural Bolivarian Youth Games, where he won gold in the all-around. He next competed at the 2024 Pacific Rim Championships, where he won again won gold in the all-around.

Vera competed at the 2025 Junior Pan American Games, where he helped Colombia finish second as a team. Individually, he won gold on vault, parallel bars, and horizontal bar. He ended the year competing at the 2025 Junior World Championships, where he co-won gold on the parallel bars alongside Nao Ojima and outright won the title on horizontal bar. He was one of only two competitors to win two individual titles alongside Arsenii Dukhno.

Vera started competing at the senior level in 2026. At the 2026 Pan American Championships, Vera helped Colombia win silver behind Canada. Individually, he qualified for the all-around final and the floor exercise, pommel horse, rings, and vault finals. During the all-around final Vera performed cleanly on all apparatuses and was able to win the all-around title after teammate Ángel Barajas fell on the final apparatus. During event finals, Vera placed seventh on floor exercise and fifth on pommel horse and rings before winning gold on vault.

== Competitive history ==
Competitive history of Camilo Vera
Year	Event	Team	AA	FX	PH	SR	VT	PB	HB
2018	Colombian Championships			3rd place, bronze medalist(s)					
2019	Colombian Championships		2nd place, silver medalist(s)	3rd place, bronze medalist(s)	4	2nd place, silver medalist(s)	4	1st place, gold medalist(s)	2nd place, silver medalist(s)
2022
2022	Junior Pan American Championships	4	3rd place, bronze medalist(s)	6	1st place, gold medalist(s)	7		1st place, gold medalist(s)	
2023	Colombian Championships		1st place, gold medalist(s)	2nd place, silver medalist(s)	2nd place, silver medalist(s)			1st place, gold medalist(s)	1st place, gold medalist(s)
2023	2nd Colombian Championships		1st place, gold medalist(s)	1st place, gold medalist(s)	2nd place, silver medalist(s)	1st place, gold medalist(s)	2nd place, silver medalist(s)	1st place, gold medalist(s)	
2023	South American Junior Championships	1st place, gold medalist(s)	1st place, gold medalist(s)	1st place, gold medalist(s)	7	1st place, gold medalist(s)	7	2nd place, silver medalist(s)	1st place, gold medalist(s)
2024	Bolivarian Youth Games		1st place, gold medalist(s)	7	2nd place, silver medalist(s)	1st place, gold medalist(s)	1st place, gold medalist(s)		1st place, gold medalist(s)
2024	Pacific Rim Championships	3rd place, bronze medalist(s)	1st place, gold medalist(s)	3rd place, bronze medalist(s)		1st place, gold medalist(s)	5		1st place, gold medalist(s)
2024	Colombian Championships		1st place, gold medalist(s)	2nd place, silver medalist(s)	2nd place, silver medalist(s)	1st place, gold medalist(s)	1st place, gold medalist(s)	4	1st place, gold medalist(s)
2024	Junior Pan American Championships	2nd place, silver medalist(s)	3rd place, bronze medalist(s)	7		1st place, gold medalist(s)	1st place, gold medalist(s)		1st place, gold medalist(s)
2025	Colombian Championships		1st place, gold medalist(s)	1st place, gold medalist(s)	1st place, gold medalist(s)	1st place, gold medalist(s)	1st place, gold medalist(s)	2nd place, silver medalist(s)	1st place, gold medalist(s)
2025	Junior Pan American Games	2nd place, silver medalist(s)	4			4	1st place, gold medalist(s)	1st place, gold medalist(s)	1st place, gold medalist(s)
2025	South American Junior Championships	1st place, gold medalist(s)	1st place, gold medalist(s)	1st place, gold medalist(s)	3rd place, bronze medalist(s)	1st place, gold medalist(s)	1st place, gold medalist(s)	1st place, gold medalist(s)	1st place, gold medalist(s)
2025	Junior World Championships	12	14					1st place, gold medalist(s)	1st place, gold medalist(s)
2026	Cairo World Cup			WD					WD
2026	Osijek World Cup								5
2026	Pan American Championships	2nd place, silver medalist(s)	1st place, gold medalist(s)	7	5	5	1st place, gold medalist(s)		
2026	Central American and Caribbean Games	1st place, gold medalist(s)	2nd place, silver medalist(s)	2nd place, silver medalist(s)	2nd place, silver medalist(s)	8	2nd place, silver medalist(s)		
2026	World Championships	8	24						6
