= Noam Berkovich =

Israeli artistic gymnast

- נועם ברקוביץ׳
- Born: 2008 (age 17–18)

Gymnastics career
- Discipline: Men's artistic gymnastics
- Country represented: Israel

Noam Berkovich (Hebrew: נועם ברקוביץ׳; born 2008) is an Israeli artistic gymnast who competed at the 2026 World Artistic Gymnastics Championships where he made the event finals in floor exercise. As a junior he also claimed bronze in the mixed team event at the 2025 European Youth Summer Olympic Festival alongside Ophir Shmuely. He achieved his first World Cup medal in Osijek where he claimed bronze on floor exercise behind his compatriot Artem Dolgopyat and British gymnast Harry Hepworth.
