= Simone Speranza =

Italian gymnast

- Full name: Simone Speranza
- Born: 26 February 2007 (age 19) Syracuse, Sicily, Italy

Gymnastics career
- Discipline: Men's artistic gymnastics
- Country represented: Italy; (2023–present)
- Club: New Sport
Medal record
Men's artistic gymnastics
Representing Italy
Junior World Championships
Silver medal – second place	2025 Manila	Floor exercise
Silver medal – second place	2025 Manila	Rings
FIG World Cup
Event / 1st / 2nd / 3rd; World Challenge Cup / 1 / 1 / 0

Simone Speranza (born 26 February 2007) is an Italian artistic gymnast. He is the 2025 Junior World silver medalist on floor exercise and rings.

== Gymnastics career ==
=== Junior: 2023–2025 ===
At the 2024 DTB Pokal Team Challenge, Speranza helped Italy win silver as a team. Later that year he competed at the 2024 Junior European Championships where he once again helped Italy win silver as a team.

Speranza competed at the 2025 Junior World Championships where helped Italy finished sixth as a team and qualified to the all-around, floor exercise, rings, and vault finals. He finished fifth in the all-around. During event finals he won silver on floor exercise and rings and placed sixth on vault.

=== Senior: 2026–present ===
Speranza became age-eligible for senior level competition in 2026. He made his international debut at the 2026 Koper World Challenge Cup where he qualified for the rings and vault finals; he won silver and gold respectively.

== Competitive history ==
Competitive history of Simone Speranza
Year	Event	Team	AA	FX	PH	SR	VT	PB	HB
2023	Lenzburg Junior Friendly	1st place, gold medalist(s)	13						
2024	DTB Pokal Team Challenge	2nd place, silver medalist(s)							
2024	Ravenna Junior Friendly	3rd place, bronze medalist(s)	17						
2024	Junior European Championships	2nd place, silver medalist(s)							
2024	Mediterranean Championships	1st place, gold medalist(s)	1st place, gold medalist(s)	1st place, gold medalist(s)	7	2nd place, silver medalist(s)	1st place, gold medalist(s)	1st place, gold medalist(s)	1st place, gold medalist(s)
2025	International Junior Team Cup	1st place, gold medalist(s)				1st place, gold medalist(s)			
2025	Champions Cup		1st place, gold medalist(s)		4	1st place, gold medalist(s)		6	1st place, gold medalist(s)
2025	Italian Championships		3rd place, bronze medalist(s)	4	8	6			5
2025	Wohnen Juniors Trophy	12	2nd place, silver medalist(s)	1st place, gold medalist(s)		1st place, gold medalist(s)	1st place, gold medalist(s)		
2025	Junior World Championships	6	5	2nd place, silver medalist(s)		2nd place, silver medalist(s)	6		R1
2026	Koper World Challenge Cup					2nd place, silver medalist(s)	1st place, gold medalist(s)		
2026	Italian Championships		3rd place, bronze medalist(s)	1st place, gold medalist(s)		1st place, gold medalist(s)	1st place, gold medalist(s)	7	
2026	European Championships	4							
2026	World Championships	9					R3		
