= Zheng Ao =

Chinese gymnast (born 2007)

Gymnastics career
- Discipline: Men's artistic gymnastics
- Country represented: China
Medal record
Representing China
Junior World Championships
Gold medal – first place	2025 Manila	Team
Gold medal – first place	2025 Manila	Pommel horse

Zheng Ao (Chinese: 郑奥) is a Chinese artistic gymnast and a member of China men's national artistic gymnastics team. He is the 2025 Junior World pommel horse champion.

== Gymnastics career ==
In November 2025, Zheng competed at the 2025 Junior World Artistic Gymnastics Championships and won gold in the team event. Individually he won gold on pommel horse with a score of 13.533 points.

== Competitive history ==
Competitive history of Zheng Ao
Year	Event	Team	AA	FX	PH	SR	VT	PB	HB
2023
2023	Asian Championships	2nd place, silver medalist(s)			2nd place, silver medalist(s)			3rd place, bronze medalist(s)	
2024
2024	Asian Championships	1st place, gold medalist(s)						2nd place, silver medalist(s)	
2025
2025	Junior World Championships	1st place, gold medalist(s)			1st place, gold medalist(s)				
