= Nao Ojima =

Japanese artistic gymnast (born 2008)

- 小島 埜和
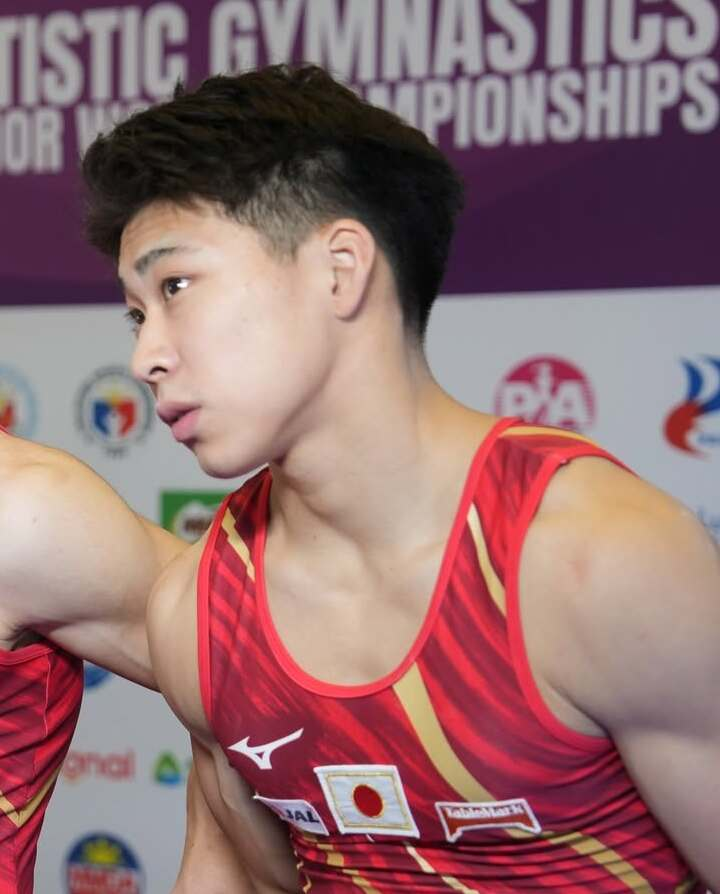
- Ojima at the 2025 Junior World Championships

Personal information
- Born: 21 February 2008 (age 18) Aomori Prefecture, Japan
- Height: 162 cm (5 ft 4 in)

Gymnastics career
- Discipline: Men's artistic gymnastics
- Country represented: Japan; (2023–present)
- Club: Tokushukai Sports
Medal record
Representing Japan
World Championships
| Gold medal – first place | 2026 Rotterdam | Team |
Junior World Championships
| Gold medal – first place | 2025 Manila | Parallel bars |
| Silver medal – second place | 2025 Manila | Team |
| Silver medal – second place | 2025 Manila | All-around |
| Bronze medal – third place | 2025 Manila | Pommel horse |

Nao Ojima (小島 埜和, Ojima Nao; born 21 February 2008) is a Japanese artistic gymnast. He is the 2025 Junior World parallel bars champion and all-around silver medalist.

== Early life ==
Ojima was born in Aomori Prefecture in 2008. He began gymnastics when he was six years old.

== Gymnastics career ==
=== Junior: 2023–2025 ===
Ojima began attending the prestigious gymnastics school, Seifu High School, in 2023. He competed domestically that year, finishing twenty-eighth at the All-Japan Junior Championships. He made his international debut at the 2024 DTB Pokal Team Challenge where Japan finished twelfth in the junior division and Ojima finished thirty-first in the all-around. At the 2024 All-Japan Junior Championships, Ojima finished sixth.

Ojima had a breakout year in 2025. In June he competed at the 2025 Junior Asian Championships where he helped Japan win team gold. Individually he won gold in the all-around and on floor exercise and horizontal bar. In August he placed first in the all-around at the All-Japan Junior Championships. In November, Ojima competed at the 2025 Junior World Championships alongside Taiki Kakutani and Eijun Yasui; together they won silver behind China. Individually Ojima won silver in the all-around behind neutral athlete Arsenii Dukhno, bronze on pommel horse, and tied for gold on parallel bars alongside Colombian Camilo Vera.

=== Senior: 2026–present ===
Ojima became age-eligible for senior level competition in 2026. He made his senior international debut at the 2026 DTB Pokal Team Challenge where he helped Japan finish second behind the United States. Individually he won gold in the all-around ahead of Yul Moldauer, won silver on horizontal bar, and bronze on floor exercise. At the All-Japan Championships, Ojima finished twelfth in the all-around but earned the second highest score on floor exercise. At the 2026 NHK Trophy, he finished ninth. Ojima was the alternate for the 2026 World Championships team; he won gold alongside the team.

== Competitive history ==
Competitive history of Nao Ojima
| Year | Event | Team | AA | FX | PH | SR | VT | PB | HB |
|---|---|---|---|---|---|---|---|---|---|
| 2023 | All-Japan Junior Championships | | 28 | | | | | | |
| 2023 | All-Japan Team Championships | 14 | | | | | | | |
| 2024 | DTB Pokal Team Challenge | 12 | | | | | | | |
| 2024 | All-Japan Junior Championships | | 6 | | | | | | |
| 2024 | Japanese National Sports Festival | | 7 | | | | | | |
2025
| 2025 | Junior Asian Championships | 1st place, gold medalist(s) | 1st place, gold medalist(s) | 1st place, gold medalist(s) | 6 | 6 | | 7 | 1st place, gold medalist(s) |
| 2025 | All-Japan Junior Championships | | 1st place, gold medalist(s) | | | | | | |
| 2025 | Japanese National Sports Festival | | 1st place, gold medalist(s) | | | | | | |
| 2025 | All-Japan Team Championships | 9 | | | | | | | |
| 2025 | Junior World Championships | 2nd place, silver medalist(s) | 2nd place, silver medalist(s) | | 3rd place, bronze medalist(s) | 6 | | 1st place, gold medalist(s) | |
| 2026 | DTB Pokal Team Challenge | 2nd place, silver medalist(s) | 1st place, gold medalist(s) | 3rd place, bronze medalist(s) | | 4 | | 5 | 2nd place, silver medalist(s) |
| 2026 | All-Japan Championships | | 12 | | | | | | |
| 2026 | NHK Trophy | | 9 | | | | | | |
| 2026 | World Championships | (gold) (Note: Ojima was the Team JPN alternate) | | | | | | | |
