= 2025 Junior World Artistic Gymnastics Championships =

3rd Artistic Gymnastics Junior World Championships

3rd Junior World Artistic Gymnastics Championships
- Venue: Marriott Grand Ballroom, Newport World Resorts
- Location: Pasay, (Note: Sometimes designated as "Manila" for marketing purposes) Metro Manila, Philippines
- Dates: 20—24 November 2025
- Nations: 74
- Website: jwch2025-manila.ph

The 2025 Junior World Artistic Gymnastics Championships was the third edition of the Artistic Gymnastics Junior World Championships, held from 20 to 24 November 2025 in Newport World Resorts, Pasay, Metro Manila, Philippines. The event was originally slated from 12 to 21 July 2025 but was moved to its current schedule.

== Host selection ==
The Gymnastics Association of the Philippines (GAP) announced in December 2024 that the Philippines was awarded the hosting rights for the third edition of the Artistic Gymnastics Junior World Championships.

== Marketing ==
The logo for the 2025 Junior World Artistic Gymnastics Championships was based on the sobriquet of the Philippines as the Pearl of the Orient Seas, and represents the hospitability of the host country. The oyster shell symbolizes the "universality" of gymnastics. The FIG logo serves as the "pearl". Above the pearl is a representation of a male and a female gymnast performing on the rings and on the balance beam.

== Competition schedule ==
Date	Session	Time	Subdivisions
Thursday, 20 November	Boy's Individual Qualification & Team Final	10:00 AM	MAG: Subdivision 1 MxG 2, Great Britain, Japan, Germany, Czech Republic, Luxembourg, Kazakhstan, Iran, Mexico, Belgium, Colombia
Thursday, 20 November	Boy's Individual Qualification & Team Final	1:15 PM	MAG: Subdivision 2 MxG 3, Singapore, Romania, Finland, South Korea, Uzbekistan, Turkey, China, Hungary, MxG 6
Thursday, 20 November	Boy's Individual Qualification & Team Final	4:30 PM	MAG: Subdivision 3 MxG 5, Ecuador, United States, Egypt, France, Netherlands, Chinese Taipei, Austria, Bangladesh, Australia, Canada
Thursday, 20 November	Boy's Individual Qualification & Team Final	7:45 PM	MAG: Subdivision 4 Spain, Ukraine, Brazil, Bulgaria, MxG 4, Sweden, New Zealand, Poland, Italy, MxG 1
Friday, 21 November	Girls Individual Qualification & Team Final	10:00 AM	WAG: Subdivision 1 Germany, Jamaica, Chinese Taipei, New Zealand, France, Italy, MxG 6
Friday, 21 November	Girls Individual Qualification & Team Final	12:00 PM	WAG: Subdivision 2 Egypt, Israel, Canada, South Africa, MxG 7, Czech Republic
Friday, 21 November	Girls Individual Qualification & Team Final	2:15 PM	WAG: Subdivision 3 MxG 1, Portugal, Hong Kong, MxG 2, Singapore, Japan
Friday, 21 November	Girls Individual Qualification & Team Final	4:15 PM	WAG: Subdivision 4 Venezuela, Azerbaijan, Belgium, South Korea, MxG 5, Romania, Ukraine
Friday, 21 November	Girls Individual Qualification & Team Final	6:30 PM	WAG: Subdivision 5 Great Britain, China, Kazakhstan, Mexico, MxG 4, United States, Turkey
Friday, 21 November	Girls Individual Qualification & Team Final	8:30 PM	WAG: Subdivision 6 Panama, Philippines, Brazil, Argentina, MxG 3, Spain, Netherlands
Saturday, 22 November	Boy's Individual All-Around Final	3:00 PM	Top 24 from qualification
Saturday, 22 November	Girl's Individual All-Around Final	7:00 PM	Top 24 from qualification
Sunday, 23 November	Apparatus Finals	2:00 PM	MAG: Floor, Pommel horse, Rings
Sunday, 23 November	Apparatus Finals	2:00 PM	WAG: Vault, Uneven bars
Monday, 24 November	Apparatus Finals	2:00 PM	MAG: Vault, Parallel bars, Horizontal bar
Monday, 24 November	Apparatus Finals	2:00 PM	WAG: Balance beam, Floor
Listed in local time (UTC+08:00). Source: Official website

== Medal summary ==
=== Medalists ===
Event	Gold	Silver	Bronze
Boys
Team	China; Wang Chengcheng; Yang Lanbin; Zheng Ao; Long Houcheng	Japan; Taiki Kakutani; Nao Ojima; Eijun Yasui; Tomoharu Tanida	United States; Danila Leykin; Dante Reive; Nathan Roman; Maksim Kan
All-around	(Individual Neutral Athletes) Arsenii Dukhno	(Japan) Nao Ojima	(China) Yang Lanbin
Floor	(China) Yang Lanbin	(Italy) Simone Speranza	(Philippines) Eldrew Yulo
Pommel horse	(China) Zheng Ao	(France) Leeroy Traore-Malatre	(Japan) Nao Ojima
Rings	(United States) Dante Reive	(Italy) Simone Speranza	(China) Wang Chengcheng
Vault	(Individual Neutral Athletes) Arsenii Dukhno	(United Kingdom) Sol Scott	(United Kingdom) Evan McPhillips
Parallel bars	(Colombia) Camilo Vera (Japan) Nao Ojima	Not awarded	(China) Yang Lanbin (United States) Danila Leykin
Horizontal bar	(Colombia) Camilo Vera	(United States) Danila Leykin	(Philippines) Eldrew Yulo
Girls
Team	France; Lola Chassat; Elena Colas; Maïana Prat; Perla Denéchère	Japan; Yume Minamino; Misa Nishiyama; Risora Ogawa; Rinon Muneta	United States; Charleigh Bullock; Lavi Crain; Caroline Moreau; Addy Fulcher
All-around	(Japan) Yume Minamino	(France) Elena Colas	(Japan) Misa Nishiyama
Vault	(United States) Lavi Crain	(Japan) Misa Nishiyama	(Romania) Alexia Blanaru
Uneven bars	(Individual Neutral Athletes) Milana Kaiumova	(Slovakia) Lucia Piliarová	(United States) Caroline Moreau
Balance beam	(China) Xiang Yina	(Japan) Yume Minamino	(United States) Caroline Moreau
Floor	(Japan) Misa Nishiyama	(France) Elena Colas	(France) Maïana Prat

=== Medal standings ===
==== Overall ====
* Host nation (Philippines)

Rank	Nation	Gold	Silver	Bronze	Total
1	China (CHN)	4	0	3	7
2	Japan (JPN)	3	5	2	10
–	Individual Neutral Athletes (AIN)	3	0	0	3
3	United States (USA)	2	1	5	8
4	Colombia (COL)	2	0	0	2
5	France (FRA)	1	3	1	5
6	Italy (ITA)	0	2	0	2
7	Great Britain (GBR)	0	1	1	2
8	Slovakia (SVK)	0	1	0	1
9	Philippines (PHI)*	0	0	2	2
10	Romania (ROU)	0	0	1	1
Totals (10 entries)		15	13	15	43

==== Boys ====
* Host nation (Philippines)

Rank	Nation	Gold	Silver	Bronze	Total
1	China (CHN)	3	0	3	6
2	Colombia (COL)	2	0	0	2
–	Individual Neutral Athletes (AIN)	2	0	0	2
3	Japan (JPN)	1	2	1	4
4	United States (USA)	1	1	2	4
5	Italy (ITA)	0	2	0	2
6	Great Britain (GBR)	0	1	1	2
7	France (FRA)	0	1	0	1
8	Philippines (PHI)*	0	0	2	2
Totals (8 entries)		9	7	9	25

==== Girls ====
* Host nation (Philippines)

Rank	Nation	Gold	Silver	Bronze	Total
1	Japan (JPN)	2	3	1	6
2	France (FRA)	1	2	1	4
3	United States (USA)	1	0	3	4
4	China (CHN)	1	0	0	1
–	Individual Neutral Athletes (AIN)	1	0	0	1
5	Slovakia (SVK)	0	1	0	1
6	Romania (ROU)	0	0	1	1
Totals (6 entries)		6	6	6	18

== Boys’ Results ==
=== Team ===
Rank	Team	Floor (gymnastics)	Pommel horse	Rings (gymnastics)	Vault (gymnastics)	Parallel bars	Horizontal bar	Total
1st place, gold medalist(s)	China	27.566 (1)	27.666 (2)	26.166 (3)	28.032 (2)	27.232 (4)	26.433 (5)	163.095
1st place, gold medalist(s)	Wang Chengcheng	13.733	14.100	13.366	13.966	11.600	13.133	163.095
1st place, gold medalist(s)	Yang Lanbin	13.833	13.033	12.800	14.066	13.666	13.300	163.095
1st place, gold medalist(s)	Zheng Ao	13.333	13.566	11.866	13.333	13.566	11.766	163.095
2nd place, silver medalist(s)	Japan	26.266 (6)	26.866 (3)	25.866 (4)	27.599 (5)	27.966 (1)	27.866 (2)	162.429
2nd place, silver medalist(s)	Taiki Kakutani	13.333	13.233	12.300	13.866	13.900	13.800	162.429
2nd place, silver medalist(s)	Nao Ojima	12.933	13.400	12.933	13.733	14.066	13.566	162.429
2nd place, silver medalist(s)	Eijun Yasui	12.466	13.466	12.933	13.600	12.766	14.066	162.429
3rd place, bronze medalist(s)	United States	27.233 (2)	25.366 (6)	26.799 (1)	27.966 (3)	27.633 (3)	27.332 (3)	162.329
3rd place, bronze medalist(s)	Danila Leykin	13.733	12.900	11.833	13.566	14.100	14.466	162.329
3rd place, bronze medalist(s)	Dante Reive	13.400	10.400	13.933	13.800	11.966	10.100	162.329
3rd place, bronze medalist(s)	Nathan Roman	13.500	12.466	12.866	14.166	13.533	12.866	162.329
4	France	26.866 (4)	27.699 (1)	25.033 (6)	27.533 (6)	26.499 (6)	28.132 (1)	161.762
4	Elias Breche	13.400	13.466	12.100	13.133	13.233	13.566	161.762
4	Nael Sakhoui	12.300	13.733	12.933	14.100	12.600	14.066	161.762
4	Leeroy Traore-Malatre	13.466	13.966	10.166	13.433	13.266	14.066	161.762
5	Great Britain	25.599 (8)	25.266 (9)	25.666 (5)	28.433 (1)	27.132 (5)	26.433 (5)	158.529
5	Uzair Chowdhury	11.600	9.766	12.900	13.666	13.966	13.433	158.529
5	Evan McPhillips	12.533	11.966	12.766	14.100	12.800	12.633	158.529
5	Sol Scott	13.066	13.300	12.033	14.333	13.166	13.000	158.529
6	Italy	27.066 (3)	24.266 (14)	26.699 (2)	27.899 (4)	25.166 (10)	26.566 (4)	157.662
6	Pietro Mazzola	13.000	12.200	12.066	13.200	12.266	12.000	157.662
6	Riccardo Ruggeri	13.366	10.300	12.833	13.966	12.300	13.033	157.662
6	Simone Speranza	13.700	12.066	13.866	13.933	12.866	13.533	157.662
7	Belgium	23.533 (25)	25.600 (4)	23.900 (15)	26.700 (12)	26.366 (7)	26.032 (7)	152.131
7	Florient Olmanst	11.600	13.100	12.000	13.300	13.033	12.866	152.131
7	Noe Strypstein	11.933	12.500	11.900	12.000	12.333	13.166	152.131
7	Arnaud Vanassche	11.300	12.466	11.066	13.400	13.333	11.766	152.131
8	Netherlands	25.566 (9)	24.100 (15)	24.499 (11)	27.366 (8)	25.466 (9)	24.933 (16)	151.930
8	Aaron Enser	12.833	12.200	11.900	14.066	12.900	11.566	151.930
8	Jayden Paton	12.733	10.766	12.133	13.300	12.433	12.200	151.930
8	Sami Soleban	12.633	11.900	12.366	13.166	12.566	12.733	151.930

=== Individual all-around ===
Boy's individual all-around final
Rank	Gymnast	Floor (gymnastics)	Pommel horse	Rings (gymnastics)	Vault (gymnastics)	Parallel bars	Horizontal bar	Total
1st place, gold medalist(s)	(Individual Neutral Athletes) Arsenii Dukhno	14.500	13.866	12.666	14.233	14.266	12.500	82.031
2nd place, silver medalist(s)	(Japan) Nao Ojima	13.500	13.533	13.200	13.933	14.100	13.533	81.799
3rd place, bronze medalist(s)	(China) Yang Lanbin	13.700	13.200	12.800	14.000	13.766	13.633	81.099
4	(United States) Danila Leykin	13.600	13.200	11.400	13.600	13.933	14.133	79.866
5	(Italy) Simone Speranza	12.766	12.300	14.100	13.566	12.800	13.500	79.032
6	(United Kingdom) Sol Scott	13.066	13.166	11.966	14.400	13.433	12.966	78.997
7	(France) Nael Sakouhi	13.600	12.233	12.800	13.533	13.300	13.466	78.932
8	(Philippines) Eldrew Yulo	14.300	13.000	12.066	13.466	12.833	13.066	78.731
9	(China) Wang Chengcheng	13.066	13.733	13.500	14.000	11.166	12.900	78.365
10	(United Kingdom) Evan McPhillips	13.300	12.000	12.733	13.700	13.333	12.800	77.866
11	(United States) Nathan Roman	13.333	12.666	12.400	12.466	13.600	13.066	77.531
12	(France) Elias Breche	13.233	12.966	12.433	13.433	13.066	12.366	77.497
13	(Poland) Tomasz le Khac	12.800	13.266	11.733	13.100	13.033	13.500	77.432
14	(Colombia) Camilo Vera	12.566	12.566	12.833	13.400	12.033	13.866	77.264
15	(Japan) Taiki Kakutani	12.066	11.666	12.366	13.800	13.733	13.600	77.231
16	(Belgium) Florient Olmanst	12.733	13.066	12.300	13.300	12.366	13.100	76.865
17	(Ukraine) Volodymyr Golovin	12.400	11.933	12.366	13.100	14.000	12.200	75.999
18	(Italy) Riccardo Ruggeri	13.566	10.133	12.766	14.066	12.666	12.600	75.797
19	(Netherlands) Aaron Enser	13.000	11.533	12.000	13.633	12.800	12.466	75.432
20	(Hungary) Dominik Kis	12.766	12.500	12.400	13.633	12.200	11.633	75.132
21	(Spain) Otger Carreres	12.500	12.633	11.766	12.966	12.766	12.366	74.997
22	(Brazil) Pedro Silvestre	12.200	12.200	12.133	13.233	12.266	12.933	74.965
23	(Netherlands) Sami Soleban	12.500	11.566	12.000	12.666	11.700	12.533	72.965
24	(Singapore) Jovi Loh	13.233	11.733	10.900	13.100	13.000	9.133	71.099

=== Floor exercise ===
Rank	Gymnast	D Score	E Score	Pen.	Bon.	Total
1st place, gold medalist(s)	(China) Yang Lanbin	5.200	8.633			13.833
2nd place, silver medalist(s)	(Italy) Simone Speranza	5.300	8.466			13.766
3rd place, bronze medalist(s)	(Philippines) Eldrew Yulo	5.300	8.433			13.733
4	(Individual Neutral Athletes) Arsenii Dukhno	5.900	7.833	-0.10		13.633
5	(China) Wang Chengcheng	5.400	8.266	-0.10		13.566
6	(United States) Danila Leykin	4.900	8.566			13.466
7	(United States) Nathan Roman	5.200	7.833	-0.30		12.733
8	(Israel) Noam Berkovich	4.900	6.633			11.533

=== Pommel horse ===
Rank	Gymnast	D Score	E Score	Pen.	Total
1st place, gold medalist(s)	(China) Zheng Ao	5.600	7.933		13.533
2nd place, silver medalist(s)	(France) Leeroy Traore-Malatre	5.100	8.100		13.200
3rd place, bronze medalist(s)	(Japan) Nao Ojima	4.600	8.100		12.700
4	(Individual Neutral Athletes) Arsenii Dukhno	5.200	7.400		12.600
4	(France) Nael Sakouhi	4.800	7.800		12.600
6	(China) Wang Chengcheng	5.000	7.200		12.200
7	(Kazakhstan) Roman Khegay	4.800	6.933		11.733
8	(Japan) Eijun Yasui	4.900	6.633		11.533

=== Rings ===
Rank	Gymnast	D Score	E Score	Pen.	Bon.	Total
1st place, gold medalist(s)	(United States) Dante Reive	4.600	9.166		0.10	13.866
2nd place, silver medalist(s)	(Italy) Simone Speranza	5.000	8.666			13.666
3rd place, bronze medalist(s)	(China) Wang Chengcheng	4.900	8.566			13.466
4	(France) Nael Sakhoui	4.500	8.633			13.133
5	(Individual Neutral Athletes) Arsenii Dukhno	4.100	8.866			12.966
6	(Japan) Nao Ojima	4.700	8.066			12.766
7	(Japan) Eijun Yasui	4.300	8.366			12.666
8	(Lithuania) Nedas Grikinis	4.500	7.633			12.133

=== Vault ===
Rank	Gymnast	Vault 1					Vault 2					Total
Rank	Gymnast	D Score	E Score	Pen.	Bon.	Score 1	D Score	E Score	Pen.	Bon.	Score 2	Total
1st place, gold medalist(s)	(Individual Neutral Athletes) Arsenii Dukhno	5.2	9.000	-0.1		14.100	5.2	9.266		0.1	14.566	14.333
2nd place, silver medalist(s)	(United Kingdom) Sol Scott	5.2	9.100			14.300	4.8	9.033			13.833	14.066
3rd place, bronze medalist(s)	(United Kingdom) Evan McPhillips	5.2	9.100			14.300	4.8	8.800			13.600	13.950
4	(Philippines) Eldrew Yulo	4.8	9.133			13.933	4.8	8.700			13.500	13.716
5	(Italy) Riccardo Ruggeri	4.8	9.000			13.800	4.8	8.733			13.533	13.666
6	(Italy) Simone Speranza	4.8	9.100			13.900	4.8	8.500			13.300	13.600
7	(Ukraine) Valentyn Havrylchenko	4.8	8.133			12.933	4.8	9.266		0.1	14.166	13.549
8	(Ukraine) Tymofii Kyrychenko	4.8	8.400			13.200	4.8	8.800			13.600	13.400

=== Parallel bars ===
Rank	Gymnast	D Score	E Score	Pen.	Bon.	Total
1st place, gold medalist(s)	(Colombia) Camilo Vera	5.300	8.566			13.866
1st place, gold medalist(s)	(Japan) Nao Ojima	5.200	8.666			13.866
3rd place, bronze medalist(s)	(China) Yang Lanbin	4.400	9.200			13.600
3rd place, bronze medalist(s)	(United States) Danila Leykin	5.200	8.400			13.600
5	(China) Zheng Ao	4.500	8.833			13.333
6	(Japan) Taiki Kakutani	5.100	8.000			13.100
7	(United Kingdom) Uzair Chowdhury	4.700	7.900			12.600
8	(Colombia) Thomas Mejía	4.400	6.800			11.200

=== Horizontal bar ===
Rank	Gymnast	D Score	E Score	Pen.	Bon.	Total
1st place, gold medalist(s)	(Colombia) Camilo Vera	5.600	8.833		0.10	14.533
2nd place, silver medalist(s)	(United States) Danila Leykin	5.600	8.533		0.10	14.233
3rd place, bronze medalist(s)	(Philippines) Eldrew Yulo	5.100	8.800		0.10	14.000
4	(Japan) Eijun Yasui	5.300	8.600			13.900
5	(Japan) Taiki Kakutani	5.100	8.766			13.866
6	(France) Nael Sakhoui	5.100	8.366			13.466
7	(France) Leeroy Traore-Malatre	5.400	8.066			13.466
8	(Poland) Tomasz le Khac	4.400	7.666			12.066

== Girls’ Results ==
=== Team ===
Rank	Team	Vault (gymnastics)	Uneven bars	Balance beam	Floor (gymnastics)	Total
1st place, gold medalist(s)	France	27.300 (3)	27.766 (1)	26.600 (4)	26.766 (1)	108.432
1st place, gold medalist(s)	Lola Chassat	12.233	13.266	12.166	11.766	108.432
1st place, gold medalist(s)	Elena Colas	14.100	14.500	13.700	13.466	108.432
1st place, gold medalist(s)	Maïana Prat	13.200	12.233	12.900	13.300	108.432
2nd place, silver medalist(s)	Japan	27.633 (1)	26.066 (4)	27.699 (1)	26.532 (2)	107.930
2nd place, silver medalist(s)	Yume Minamino	13.633	13.100	13.866	12.733	107.930
2nd place, silver medalist(s)	Misa Nishiyama	14.000	12.966	13.833	13.466	107.930
2nd place, silver medalist(s)	Risora Ogawa	12.933	12.100	13.766	13.066	107.930
3rd place, bronze medalist(s)	United States	27.532 (2)	26.566 (2)	26.666 (3)	25.466 (4)	106.230
3rd place, bronze medalist(s)	Charleigh Bullock	13.333	12.566	13.133	12.666	106.230
3rd place, bronze medalist(s)	Lavi Crain	14.066	13.266	12.600	12.033	106.230
3rd place, bronze medalist(s)	Caroline Moreau	13.466	13.300	13.533	12.800	106.230
4	China	26.166 (8)	25.966 (5)	27.133 (2)	25.266 (5)	104.531
4	Huang Ziyi	12.933	11.933	14.100	12.633	104.531
4	Jiang Shuting	13.233	13.433	12.866	12.333	104.531
4	Xiang Yina	12.900	12.533	13.033	12.633	104.531
5	Romania	26.633 (5)	22.732 (14)	26.299 (5)	25.499 (3)	101.163
5	Alexia Blanaru	13.600	11.966	13.333	12.566	101.163
5	Iris Iordache	12.600	10.766	12.200	12.933	101.163
5	Aniela Tudor	13.033	10.766	12.966	12.066	101.163
6	Italy	26.833 (4)	24.633 (7)	24.433 (8)	24.899 (6)	100.798
6	Eleonora Calacuira	13.333	12.233	12.833	12.766	100.798
6	Mia Proietti	13.500	12.400	11.100	11.866	100.798
6	Anthea Sisio	13.166	10.633	11.600	12.133	100.798
7	United Kingdom	26.366 (6)	26.266 (3)	22.132 (21)	24.733 (8)	99.497
7	Helena Finc	13.166	13.600	11.666	12.533	99.497
7	Jenitha Johnson	12.300	12.133	10.466	12.200	99.497
7	Simone Seed	13.200	12.666	10.400	11.866	99.497
8	Ukraine	24.199 (21)	25.366 (6)	24.600 (6)	24.133 (10)	98.298
8	Kristina Hrudetska	11.733	12.733	12.300	12.000	98.298
8	Bohdana Kovalova	11.500	12.200	12.033	12.133	98.298
8	Anastasiia Lev	12.466	12.633	12.300	11.566	98.298

=== Individual all-around ===
Girl's individual all-around final
Rank	Gymnast	Vault (gymnastics)	Uneven bars	Balance beam	Floor (gymnastics)	Total
1st place, gold medalist(s)	(Japan) Yume Minamino	13.566	13.366	13.700	13.000	53.632
2nd place, silver medalist(s)	(France) Elena Colas	14.066	12.666	13.200	13.366	53.298
3rd place, bronze medalist(s)	(Japan) Misa Nishiyama	13.800	13.133	13.100	13.033	53.066
4	(United States) Lavi Crain	13.133	13.333	13.400	12.533	52.399
5	(United States) Caroline Moreau	13.500	13.200	12.066	12.833	51.599
6	(Individual Neutral Athletes) Milana Kaiumova	13.333	12.133	13.166	12.700	51.332
7	(France) Maïana Prat	12.800	12.366	13.300	12.766	51.232
8	(China) Jiang Shuting	13.200	13.966	12.033	11.966	51.165
9	(Individual Neutral Athletes) Sofia Shtykhetskaya	13.166	13.000	11.733	13.000	50.899
10	(Slovakia) Lucia Piliarová	12.766	13.700	12.700	11.600	50.766
11	(Italy) Eleonora Calaciura	13.233	11.800	13.066	12.633	50.732
12	(United Kingdom) Helena Finc	12.733	13.200	12.566	12.066	50.565
13	(Romania) Alexia Blanaru	13.366	11.833	13.266	11.833	50.298
14	(Ukraine) Anastasiia Lev	12.366	13.133	12.066	11.800	49.365
15	(United Kingdom) Simone Seed	12.966	12.566	12.000	11.633	49.165
16	(Italy) Mia Proietti	13.833	12.166	11.733	11.400	49.132
17	(Netherlands) Riva Bon	12.166	11.533	12.400	12.300	48.399
18	(Belgium) Mie de Wilde	12.333	12.500	11.466	11.800	48.099
19	(Georgia (country)) Maria Jvania	12.466	11.366	12.366	11.833	48.031
20	(Belgium) Liese Vieuxtemps	12.100	11.033	12.433	11.533	47.099
21	(Romania) Aniela Tudor	12.100	10.466	12.533	11.733	46.832
22	(China) Huang Ziyi	11.800	12.066	11.900	10.866	46.632
23	(Spain) Victoria Valeros	12.600	11.600	10.000	12.000	46.200
24	(Ukraine) Kristina Hrudetska	11.766	12.066	11.133	10.933	45.898

=== Vault ===
Position	Gymnast	Vault 1				Vault 2				Bonus	Total
Position	Gymnast	D Score	E Score	Pen.	Score 1	D Score	E Score	Pen.	Score 2	Bonus	Total
1st place, gold medalist(s)	(United States) Lavi Crain	5.000	9.066		14.066	4.200	9.100		13.300		13.683
2nd place, silver medalist(s)	(Japan) Misa Nishiyama	5.000	8.833		13.833	4.600	8.833		13.433		13.633
3rd place, bronze medalist(s)	(Romania) Alexia Blanaru	4.200	8.933		13.133	5.000	9.000		14.000		13.566
4	(Italy) Mia Proietti	5.000	8.900		13.900	4.200	8.866		13.066		13.483
5	(France) Elena Colas	5.000	8.600	-0.3	13.300	4.200	9.100		13.300		13.300
6	(Japan) Yume Minamino	4.600	8.633		13.233	4.200	8.866		13.066		13.149
7	(Romania) Aniela Tudor	4.400	8.933		13.333	4.800	8.266	-0.3	12.766		13.049
8	(Azerbaijan) Albina Aliyeva	5.000	7.300	-0.1	12.200	4.200	8.533		12.733		12.466

=== Uneven bars ===
Rank	Gymnast	D Score	E Score	Pen.	Total
1st place, gold medalist(s)	(Individual Neutral Athletes) Milana Kaiumova	6.100	7.833		13.933
2nd place, silver medalist(s)	(Slovakia) Lucia Piliarová	5.500	8.300		13.800
3rd place, bronze medalist(s)	(United States) Caroline Moreau	5.300	8.033		13.333
4	(France) Elena Colas	6.100	7.100		13.200
5	(France) Lola Chassat	5.000	7.900		12.900
6	(United Kingdom) Helena Finc	5.500	7.066		12.566
7	(China) Jiang Shuting	5.400	6.966		12.366
8	(United States) Lavi Crain	5.100	6.266		11.366

=== Balance beam ===
Rank	Gymnast	D Score	E Score	Pen.	Total
1st place, gold medalist(s)	(China) Xiang Yina	5.900	8.233		14.133
2nd place, silver medalist(s)	(Japan) Yume Minamino	5.500	8.300		13.800
3rd place, bronze medalist(s)	(United States) Caroline Moreau	5.700	7.900		13.600
4	(Japan) Misa Nishiyama	5.200	8.200		13.400
5	(China) Huang Ziyi	6.000	6.933		12.933
6	(United States) Charleigh Bullock	5.000	7.766		12.766
7	(Romania) Alexia Blanaru	5.200	7.533		12.733
8	(France) Elena Colas	5.300	7.300		12.600

=== Floor exercise ===
Rank	Gymnast	D Score	E Score	Pen.	Total
1st place, gold medalist(s)	(Japan) Misa Nishiyama	5.300	8.233		13.533
2nd place, silver medalist(s)	(France) Elena Colas	5.600	7.900	0.300	13.200
3rd place, bronze medalist(s)	(France) Maïana Prat	5.300	7.866		13.166
4	(Japan) Risora Ogawa	4.900	8.033		12.933
5	(Italy) Eleonora Calaciura	4.800	8.033		12.833
6	(Romania) Iris Iordache	4.900	7.866		12.766
6	(United States) Caroline Moreau	5.000	7.766		12.766
8	(Individual Neutral Athletes) Sofia Shtykhetskaya	4.800	7.933		12.733

== Qualification ==
=== Boy's results ===
==== Individual all-around ====
Rank	Gymnast	Floor (gymnastics)	Pommel horse	Rings (gymnastics)	Vault (gymnastics)	Parallel bars	Horizontal bar	Total	Qual.
1	(Individual Neutral Athletes) Arsenii Dukhno	14.500	13.833	13.233	14.166	13.433	12.900	82.065	Q
2	(China) Yang Lanbin	13.833	13.033	12.800	14.066	13.666	13.300	80.698	Q
3	(Japan) Nao Ojima	12.933	13.400	12.933	13.733	14.066	13.566	80.631	Q
4	(United States) Danila Leykin	13.733	12.900	11.833	13.566	14.100	14.466	80.598	Q
5	(Japan) Taiki Kakutani	13.333	13.233	12.300	13.866	13.900	13.800	80.432	Q
6	(Italy) Simone Speranza	13.700	12.066	13.866	13.933	12.866	13.533	79.964	Q
7	(China) Wang Chengcheng	13.733	14.100	13.366	13.966	11.600	13.133	79.898	Q
8	(France) Nael Sakhoui	12.300	13.733	12.933	14.100	12.600	14.066	79.732	Q
9	(United States) Nathan Roman	13.500	12.466	12.866	14.166	13.533	12.866	79.397	Q
10	(Japan) Eijun Yasui	12.466	13.466	12.933	13.600	12.766	14.066	79.297	–
11	(Colombia) Camilo Vera	12.600	12.200	12.900	13.800	14.033	13.700	79.233	Q
12	(United Kingdom) Sol Scott	13.066	13.300	12.033	14.333	13.166	13.000	78.898	Q
13	(France) Elias Breche	13.400	13.466	12.100	13.133	13.233	13.566	78.898	Q
14	(France) Leeroy Traore-Malatre	13.466	13.966	10.166	13.433	13.266	14.066	78.363	–
15	(Philippines) Eldrew Yulo	14.233	11.333	12.200	14.200	12.666	13.700	78.332	Q
16	(China) Zheng Ao	13.333	13.566	11.866	13.333	13.566	11.766	77.430	–
17	(United Kingdom) Evan McPhillips	12.533	11.966	12.766	14.100	12.800	12.633	76.798	Q
18	(Ukraine) Volodymyr Golovin	13.000	12.533	12.466	13.133	12.433	13.133	76.698	Q
19	(Belgium) Florient Olmanst	11.600	13.100	12.000	13.300	13.033	12.866	75.899	Q
20	(Spain) Otger Carreres	12.800	12.666	12.000	13.333	12.366	12.733	75.898	Q
21	(Italy) Riccardo Ruggeri	13.366	10.300	12.833	13.966	12.300	13.033	75.798	Q
22	(Singapore) Jovi Loh	12.400	12.333	11.766	13.433	12.566	13.200	75.698	Q
23	(Netherlands) Aaron Enser	12.833	12.200	11.900	14.066	12.900	11.566	75.465	Q
24	(Poland) Tomasz le Khac	11.133	13.200	11.133	13.433	12.966	13.566	75.431	Q
25	(Netherlands) Sami Soleban	12.633	11.900	12.366	13.166	12.566	12.733	75.364	Q
26	(United Kingdom) Uzair Chowdhury	11.600	9.766	12.900	13.666	13.966	13.433	75.331	–
27	(Brazil) Pedro Silvestre	11.766	12.433	12.366	13.400	12.833	12.500	75.298	Q
28	(Hungary) Dominik Kis	12.500	12.566	12.466	13.233	11.666	12.666	75.097	Q
29	(Kazakhstan) Roman Khegay	11.366	13.700	11.333	13.433	11.966	13.100	74.898	R1
30	(Italy) Pietro Mazzola	13.000	12.200	12.066	13.200	12.266	12.000	74.732	–
31	(Israel) Noam Berkovich	14.000	11.600	11.966	12.833	11.966	12.000	74.365	R2
32	(Spain) Orian Diaz	12.166	12.700	12.466	12.900	12.300	11.833	74.365	R3
33	(Mexico) Aaron Ibarra	12.266	11.566	11.733	13.366	12.933	12.200	74.064	R4

==== Floor exercise ====
Rank	Gymnast	D Score	E Score	Pen.	Bon.	Total	Qual.
1	(Individual Neutral Athletes) Arsenii Dukhno	5.900	8.600			14.500	Q
2	(Philippines) Eldrew Yulo	5.400	8.733		0.10	14.233	Q
3	(Israel) Noam Berkovich	5.100	8.800		0.10	14.000	Q
4	(China) Yang Lanbin	5.200	8.733	-0.10		13.833	Q
5	(United States) Danila Leykin	4.900	8.833			13.733	Q
6	(China) Wang Chengcheng	5.400	8.333			13.733	Q
7	(Italy) Simone Speranza	5.300	8.300		0.10	13.700	Q
8	(United States) Nathan Roman	5.200	8.200		0.10	13.500	Q
9	(France) Leeroy Traore-Malatre	4.800	8.566		0.10	13.466	R1
10	(France) Elias Breche	4.900	8.500			13.400	R2
11	(United States) Dante Reive	5.000	8.400			13.400	–
12	(Italy) Riccardo Ruggeri	5.200	8.166			13.366	R3

==== Pommel horse ====
Rank	Gymnast	D Score	E Score	Pen.	Total	Qual.
1	(China) Wang Chengcheng	5.300	8.800		14.100	Q
2	(France) Leeroy Traore-Malatre	5.500	8.466		13.966	Q
3	(Individual Neutral Athletes) Arsenii Dukhno	5.200	8.633		13.833	Q
4	(France) Nael Sakhoui	5.100	8.633		13.733	Q
5	(Kazakhstan) Roman Khegay	5.200	8.500		13.700	Q
6	(China) Zheng Ao	5.400	8.166		13.566	Q
7	(Japan) Eijun Yasui	5.000	8.466		13.466	Q
8	(France) Elias Breche	5.400	8.066		13.466	–
9	(Japan) Nao Ojima	4.800	8.600		13.400	Q
10	(United Kingdom) Sol Scott	5.000	8.300		13.300	R1
11	(Japan) Taiki Kakutani	4.600	8.633		13.233	–
12	(Poland) Tomasz le Khac	4.500	8.700		13.200	R2
13	(Belgium) Florient Olmanst	4.500	8.600		13.100	R3

==== Rings ====
Rank	Gymnast	D Score	E Score	Pen.	Bon.	Total	Qual.
1	(United States) Dante Reive	4.600	9.233		0.10	13.933	Q
2	(Italy) Simone Speranza	5.000	8.866			13.866	Q
3	(China) Wang Chengcheng	4.900	8.466			13.366	Q
4	(Individual Neutral Athletes) Arsenii Dukhno	4.100	9.133			13.233	Q
5	(Lithuania) Nedas Grikinis	4.500	8.500			13.000	Q
6	(Japan) Eijun Yasui	4.300	8.633			12.933	Q
7	(France) Nael Sakhoui	4.500	8.433			12.933	Q
8	(Japan) Nao Ojima	4.700	8.233			12.933	Q
9	(Colombia) Camilo Vera	4.300	8.600			12.900	R1
9	(United Kingdom) Uzair Chowdhury	4.300	8.600			12.900	R1
11	(United States) Nathan Roman	3.900	8.866		0.10	12.866	R3

==== Vault ====
Rank	Gymnast	Vault 1					Vault 2					Total	Qual.
Rank	Gymnast	D Score	E Score	Pen.	Bon.	Score 1	D Score	E Score	Pen.	Bon.	Score 2	Total	Qual.
1	(Individual Neutral Athletes) Arsenii Dukhno	5.200	8.966			14.166	5.200	9.066			14.266	14.216	Q
2	(United Kingdom) Sol Scott	5.200	9.233	-0.10		14.333	4.800	9.133			13.933	14.133	Q
3	(Italy) Riccardo Ruggeri	4.800	9.166			13.966	4.800	8.800			13.600	13.783	Q
4	(Italy) Simone Speranza	4.800	9.133			13.933	4.800	8.833			13.633	13.783	Q
5	(Philippines) Eldrew Yulo	5.200	9.000			14.200	4.800	8.800	-0.30		13.300	13.750	Q
6	(Ukraine) Valentyn Havrylchenko	4.800	8.533			13.333	4.800	9.000			13.800	13.566	Q
7	(Ukraine) Tymofii Kyrychenko	4.800	8.500			13.300	4.800	9.000			13.800	13.550	Q
8	(United Kingdom) Evan McPhillips	5.200	8.900			14.100	4.800	8.233	-0.10		12.933	13.516	Q
9	(Chile) Arturo Rossel	4.400	9.233		0.10	13.733	4.400	8.733			13.133	13.433	R1
10	(Austria) Samuel Wachter	4.400	8.900			13.300	4.400	9.100			13.500	13.400	R2
11	(India) Harschit Damodharan	4.800	8.633			13.433	4.400	8.933			13.333	13.383	R3

==== Parallel bars ====
Rank	Gymnast	D Score	E Score	Pen.	Bon.	Total	Qual.
1	(United States) Danila Leykin	5.200	8.900			14.100	Q
2	(Japan) Nao Ojima	5.200	8.766		0.10	14.066	Q
3	(Colombia) Camilo Vera	5.300	8.733			14.033	Q
4	(United Kingdom) Uzair Chowdhury	5.100	8.866			13.966	Q
5	(Japan) Taiki Kakutani	5.200	8.600		0.10	13.900	Q
6	(Colombia) Thomas Mejía	5.300	8.466			13.766	Q
7	(China) Yang Lanbin	4.400	9.166		0.10	13.666	Q
8	(China) Zheng Ao	4.500	9.066			13.566	Q
9	(United States) Nathan Roman	5.000	8.533			13.533	R1
10	(Individual Neutral Athletes) Arsenii Dukhno	5.500	7.833		0.10	13.433	R2
11	(Belgium) Arnaud Vanassche	4.800	8.433		0.10	13.333	R3

==== Horizontal bar ====
Rank	Gymnast	D Score	E Score	Pen.	Bon.	Total	Qual.
1	(United States) Danila Leykin	5.600	8.766		0.10	14.466	Q
2	(France) Nael Sakhoui	5.100	8.866		0.10	14.066	Q
3	(France) Leeroy Traore-Malatre	5.400	8.666			14.066	Q
4	(Japan) Eijun Yasui	5.300	8.666		0.10	14.066	Q
5	(Japan) Taiki Kakutani	5.100	8.700			13.800	Q
6	(Philippines) Eldrew Yulo	5.100	8.900	-0.30		13.700	Q
7	(Colombia) Camilo Vera	5.400	8.300			13.700	Q
8	(France) Elias Breche	4.600	8.966			13.566	–
9	(Poland) Tomasz le Khac	4.800	8.766			13.566	Q
10	(Japan) Nao Ojima	5.000	8.566			13.566	–
11	(Italy) Simone Speranza	4.800	8.733			13.533	R1
12	(United Kingdom) Uzair Chowdhury	4.700	8.733			13.433	R2
13	(China) Yang Lanbin	4.400	8.900			13.300	R3

=== Girl's results ===
==== Individual all-around ====
Rank	Gymnast	Vault (gymnastics)	Uneven bars	Balance beam	Floor (gymnastics)	Total	Qual.
1	(France) Elena Colas	14.100	14.500	13.700	13.466	55.766	Q
2	(Japan) Misa Nishiyama	14.000	12.966	13.833	13.466	54.265	Q
3	(Japan) Yume Minamino	13.633	13.100	13.866	12.733	53.332	Q
4	(United States) Caroline Moreau	13.466	13.300	13.533	12.800	53.099	Q
5	(United States) Lavi Crain	14.066	13.266	12.600	12.033	51.965	Q
6	(Japan) Risora Ogawa	12.933	12.100	13.766	13.066	51.865	–
7	(China) Jiang Shuting	13.233	13.433	12.866	12.333	51.865	Q
8	(United States) Charleigh Bullock	13.333	12.566	13.133	12.666	51.698	–
9	(France) Maïana Prat	13.200	12.233	12.900	13.300	51.633	Q
10	(Individual Neutral Athletes) Milana Kaiumova	13.200	13.333	12.700	12.400	51.633	Q
11	(China) Huang Ziyi	12.933	11.933	14.100	12.633	51.599	Q
12	(Romania) Alexia Blanaru	13.600	11.966	13.333	12.566	51.465	Q
13	(Italy) Eleonora Calaciura	13.333	12.233	12.833	12.766	51.165	Q
14	(Individual Neutral Athletes) Sofia Shtykhetskaya	13.400	12.433	12.100	13.200	51.133	Q
15	(China) Xiang Yina	12.900	12.533	13.033	12.633	51.099	–
16	(United Kingdom) Helena Finc	13.166	13.600	11.666	12.533	50.965	Q
17	(Slovakia) Lucia Piliarová	12.933	13.466	12.466	11.866	50.731	Q
18	(France) Lola Chassat	12.233	13.266	12.166	11.766	49.431	–
19	(Belgium) Mie de Wilde	12.733	12.000	12.433	12.200	49.366	Q
20	(Netherlands) Riva Bon	12.433	11.533	12.833	12.300	49.099	Q
21	(Ukraine) Anastasiia Lev	12.466	12.633	12.300	11.566	48.965	Q
22	(Italy) Mia Proietti	13.500	12.400	11.100	11.866	48.866	Q
23	(Romania) Aniela Tudor	13.033	10.766	12.966	12.066	48.831	Q
24	(Ukraine) Kristina Hrudetska	11.733	12.733	12.300	12.000	48.766	Q
25	(Romania) Iris Iordache	12.600	10.766	12.200	12.933	48.499	–
26	(Spain) Victoria Valeros	13.000	11.400	12.133	11.900	48.433	Q
27	(Georgia (country)) Maria Jvania	12.333	12.433	12.400	11.033	48.199	Q
28	(Belgium) Lisa Vieuxtemps	12.233	12.100	11.233	12.600	48.166	Q
29	(United Kingdom) Simone Seed	13.200	12.666	10.400	11.866	48.132	Q
30	(Germany) Charleen Pach	13.200	11.533	11.300	11.966	47.999	R1
31	(Panama) Ana Lucia Beitia	12.866	11.933	11.233	11.900	47.932	R2
32	(Canada) Aila McKinley	13.133	11.366	11.733	11.666	47.898	R3
33	(Ukraine) Bohdana Kovalova	11.500	12.200	12.033	12.133	47.866	–
34	(Brazil) Nicole Bello	12.900	10.666	12.166	12.100	47.832	R4

==== Vault ====
Rank	Gymnast	Vault 1				Vault 2				Bonus	Total	Qual.
Rank	Gymnast	D Score	E Score	Pen.	Score 1	D Score	E Score	Pen.	Score 2	Bonus	Total	Qual.
1	(Japan) Misa Nishiyama	5.000	9.000		14.000	4.600	9.033		13.633		13.816	Q
2	(France) Elena Colas	5.000	9.100		14.100	4.200	9.133		13.333		13.716	Q
3	(United States) Lavi Crain	5.000	9.066		14.066	4.200	9.000		13.200		13.633	Q
4	(Japan) Yume Minamino	4.600	9.033		13.633	4.200	8.966		13.166		13.399	Q
5	(Romania) Alexia Blanaru	5.000	8.600		13.600	4.200	8.966		13.166		13.383	Q
6	(Romania) Aniela Tudor	4.400	8.633		13.033	4.800	8.733		13.533		13.283	Q
7	(Italy) Mia Proietti	5.000	8.800	-0.30	13.500	4.200	8.700		12.900		13.200	Q
8	(Azerbaijan) Albina Aliyeva	5.000	8.533		13.533	4.200	8.666		12.866		13.199	Q
9	(United States) Caroline Moreau	4.200	9.266		13.466	3.600	9.266		12.866		13.166	R1
10	(China) Jiang Shuting	4.400	8.833		13.233	4.200	8.900		13.100		13.166	R2
11	(Individual Neutral Athletes) Sofia Shtykhetskaya	4.200	9.200		13.400	3.600	9.266		12.866		13.133	R3

==== Uneven bars ====
Rank	Gymnast	D Score	E Score	Pen.	Total	Qual.
1	(France) Elena Colas	6.300	8.200		14.500	Q
2	(United Kingdom) Helena Finc	5.600	8.000		13.600	Q
3	(Slovakia) Lucia Piliarová	5.500	7.966		13.466	Q
4	(China) Jiang Shuting	5.600	7.833		13.433	Q
5	(Individual Neutral Athletes) Milana Kaiumova	5.900	7.433		13.333	Q
6	(United States) Caroline Moreau	5.300	8.000		13.300	Q
7	(France) Lola Chassat	5.000	8.266		13.266	Q
8	(United States) Lavi Crain	5.400	7.866		13.266	Q
9	(Japan) Yume Minamino	5.600	7.500		13.100	R1
10	(Japan) Misa Nishiyama	5.700	7.266		12.966	R2
11	(Ukraine) Kristina Hrudetska	5.200	7.533		12.733	R3

==== Balance beam ====
Rank	Gymnast	D Score	E Score	Pen.	Total	Qual.
1	(China) Huang Ziyi	6.400	7.700		14.100	Q
2	(Japan) Yume Minamino	5.600	8.266		13.866	Q
3	(Japan) Misa Nishiyama	5.500	8.333		13.833	Q
4	(Japan) Risora Ogawa	5.400	8.366		13.766	–
5	(France) Elena Colas	5.600	8.100		13.700	Q
6	(United States) Caroline Moreau	5.500	8.033		13.533	Q
7	(Romania) Alexia Blanaru	5.300	8.033		13.333	Q
8	(United States) Charleigh Bullock	5.000	8.133		13.133	Q
9	(China) Xiang Yina	6.000	7.033		13.033	Q
10	(Chinese Taipei) Chou Mei	5.000	8.000		13.000	R1
11	(Malta) Sophie St. John	4.900	8.066		12.966	R2
11	(Romania) Aniela Tudor	4.900	8.066		12.966	R2

==== Floor exercise ====
Rank	Gymnast	D Score	E Score	Pen.	Total	Qual.
1	(Japan) Misa Nishiyama	5.300	8.166		13.466	Q
2	(France) Elena Colas	5.500	7.966		13.466	Q
3	(France) Maïana Prat	5.300	8.000		13.300	Q
4	(Individual Neutral Athletes) Sofia Shtykhetskaya	5.200	8.100	-0.10	13.200	Q
5	(Japan) Risora Ogawa	4.900	8.166		13.066	Q
6	(Romania) Iris Iordache	5.000	7.933		12.933	Q
7	(United States) Caroline Moreau	5.000	7.800		12.800	Q
8	(Italy) Eleonora Calaciura	4.800	7.966		12.766	Q
9	(Japan) Yume Minamino	4.900	7.833		12.733	–
10	(United States) Charleigh Bullock	4.800	7.966	-0.10	12.666	R1
11	(China) Xiang Yina	4.600	8.033		12.633	R2
12	(China) Huang Ziyi	5.100	7.633	-0.10	12.633	R3
