= Tatum Drusch =

American artistic gymnast (born 2008)

- Drusch at the 2026 Swiss Cup

Personal information
- Born: November 25, 2008 (age 17) White Bear Lake, Minnesota, U.S.

Gymnastics career
- Discipline: Women's artistic gymnastics
- Country represented: United States; (2025–present)
- College team: LSU Tigers
- Club: Flips Gymnastics
- Head coach: Bart Roskoski
- Assistant coach: Lori Roskoski
Medal record
Women's artistic gymnastics
Representing United States
FIG World Cup
Event	1st	2nd	3rd
World Challenge Cup	0	1	0
Total	0	1	0

Tatum Drusch (born November 25, 2008) is an American artistic gymnast.

== Gymnastics career ==
=== 2022–2023 ===
Drusch began competing as a junior elite in 2022. Her first accolades at the national level came at the 2023 American Classic, where she won the gold medal on vault as well as silver in the all-around. Later that year, she once again won silver in the all-around at the U.S. Classic, in addition to fourth on vault.

The 2023 U.S. Championships was Drusch's last competition as a junior. She won the silver medal on vault. In the all-around, she placed ninth, and she finished eighth on balance beam.

=== 2024 ===
Drusch became age-eligible for senior level competition in 2024; she made her senior debut at the 2024 Winter Cup. Her best result was 21st on uneven bars. At the 2024 American Classic, she finished fourth on uneven bars and tied for sixth in the all-around.

In May, Drusch competed on vault, uneven bars, and balance beam at the U.S. Classic. She finished 16th on uneven bars.

Drusch qualified for and competed at the 2024 U.S. Championships. She finished 25th in the all-around, and her best event result was once again on uneven bars, where she placed 19th.

=== 2025 ===
Drusch began the 2025 season at Winter Cup. She won the gold medal on beam, tying with Claire Pease. She also finished fourth in the all-around and, with a total of 52.550, qualified for the 2025 U.S. Championships. She was named as a member of the U.S. Senior National Team following the competition.

The 2025 City of Jesolo Trophy was Drusch's first international competition representing the United States. She and teammates Pease, Simone Rose, Dulcy Caylor, and Ashlee Sullivan won the silver medal, just 0.250 behind the Italy A team. Individually, Drusch placed 13th in the all-around and had the sixth-highest single-vault score of the qualification round.

Though Drusch had qualified for the all-around at the 2025 U.S. Championships, she elected to only compete on uneven bars, where she placed 16th, and balance beam, where she finished 17th.

In October 2025, Drusch announced her commitment to compete for the LSU Tigers in NCAA gymnastics.

=== 2026 ===
A knee injury forced Drusch to miss the beginning of the 2026 season. She returned to competition at the 2026 American Classic, where she won gold in the all-around ahead of Jade Carey and Zoey Molomo. She also won gold on beam, silver on uneven bars, and bronze on floor exercise. Her performance at this competition allowed her to qualify as an all-arounder for the 2026 U.S. Championships.

In July, Drusch announced her plans to defer her NCAA enrollment to focus on training for the 2028 Olympics.

Drusch next competed at the U.S. Classic, where she won the bronze medal on vault. She also placed seventh on uneven bars, eighth on floor, and 12th in the all-around.

At the 2026 U.S. Championships, Drusch once again placed 12th in the all-around, in addition to seventh on uneven bars and eighth on floor. She also finished fourth on vault. Drusch was named to the U.S. National Team based on her results. She also received an invitation to the team selection camp for the 2026 World Championships.

Drusch competing at the 2026 Swiss Cup

In September, Drusch was chosen to compete at the Szombathely World Challenge Cup with teammate Dulcy Caylor. She qualified for all four event finals. She won the silver medal on uneven bars behind Flávia Saraiva of Brazil and ahead of Barbora Kundrát of Slovakia. Additionally, she placed fourth on vault and floor exercise and sixth on balance beam.

Alongside teammates Lila Richardson, Joshua Karnes, and Yul Moldauer, Drusch represented the United States at the 2026 Arthur Gander Memorial, an individual competition, and the Swiss Cup, a mixed-team event. At the Arthur Gander Memorial, which uses a three-event format, she performed routines on vault, uneven bars, and balance beam to win the gold medal ahead of Karina Schönmaier of Germany and Lena Bickel of Switzerland. At the Swiss Cup, the U.S. team placed fourth.

== Competitive history ==
Competitive history of Tatum Drusch at the junior level
Year	Event	Team	AA	VT	UB	BB	FX
2023
2023	Winter Cup		17				
2023	American Classic		2nd place, silver medalist(s)	1st place, gold medalist(s)	6	4	5
2023	U.S. Classic		2nd place, silver medalist(s)	4			8
2023	U.S. National Championships		9	2nd place, silver medalist(s)		8	8

Competitive history of Tatum Drusch at the senior level
Year	Event	Team	AA	VT	UB	BB	FX
2024	Winter Cup		25				
2024	American Classic		6		4		
2024	U.S. Classic						
2024	U.S. National Championships		25				
2025	Winter Cup		4			1st place, gold medalist(s)	
2025	City of Jesolo Trophy	2nd place, silver medalist(s)	13				
2025	U.S. National Championships						
2026	American Classic		1st place, gold medalist(s)	4	2nd place, silver medalist(s)	1st place, gold medalist(s)	3rd place, bronze medalist(s)
2026	U.S. Classic		12	3rd place, bronze medalist(s)	7		8
2026	U.S. National Championships		12	4	7		8
2026	Szombathely World Challenge Cup			4	2nd place, silver medalist(s)	6	4
2026	Arthur Gander Memorial		1st place, gold medalist(s)				
2026	Swiss Cup	4					
