= Isabella Anzola =

American artistic gymnast (born 2010)

- Anzola at the 2026 U.S. National Championships

Personal information
- Full name: Isabella Marie Anzola
- Born: November 5, 2010 (age 15) Atlanta, Georgia, U.S.

Gymnastics career
- Discipline: Women's artistic gymnastics
- Country represented: United States; (2024-2025)
- Club: WOGA
- Head coach: Valeri Liukin
- Assistant coach: Anna Liukin
Medal record
Women's artistic gymnastics
Representing United States
Junior Pan American Championships
Gold medal – first place	2024 Santa Marta	Team
Gold medal – first place	2024 Santa Marta	Balance beam
Bronze medal – third place	2024 Santa Marta	Floor exercise

Isabella Marie Anzola (born November 5, 2010) is an American artistic gymnast. She is the 2024 Junior Pan American balance beam champion, as well as the 2025 junior national balance beam champion.

== Junior career ==
=== 2022 ===
In May 2022, Anzola competed at the U.S. Women's Development Program National Championships, winning the bronze medal on balance beam and placing 16th in the all-around as part of the Junior A group.

Anzola competed as a Hopes gymnast through the remainder of 2022. At the Hopes Classic, she tied for first on floor exercise. She also won floor exercise gold and balance beam silver at the 2022 Hopes National Championships in the 11-12 division.

=== 2023 ===
Anzola qualified as a junior elite in January 2023, two months after her 12th birthday. Her first elite competition was 2023 Winter Cup, where she placed sixth on balance beam and eighth in the all-around.

In July, Anzola participated in the American Classic. In addition to placing fifth in the all-around and tying for first on balance beam with Claire Pease, her all-around score at this competition allowed her to qualify for the 2023 U.S. National Championships.

At the 2023 U.S. Classic, Anzola won the bronze medal on both balance beam and floor exercise. At the Junior National Championships a few weeks later, she placed 17th in the all-around, and her strongest individual event placement was 14th on floor exercise.

=== 2024 ===
Anzola began the 2024 season at Winter Cup in February, where she won the silver medal on balance beam, in addition to placing 7th on floor and 11th in the all-around. She also competed at the American Classic, earning her National Championship qualifying score as well as silver on beam and bronze in the all-around.

In May, Anzola was chosen to represent the United States at the 2024 Junior Pan American Championships in Colombia, alongside teammates Gabrielle Hardie, Camie Westerman, and Addy Fulcher. The U.S. team won the gold medal ahead of Canada and Argentina, and Anzola had the fifth-highest all-around score (though she did not officially place due to the two-per-country rule). During event finals, she won the gold medal on balance beam, as well as the bronze medal on floor behind Hardie and Emilia Acosta of Argentina.

At the 2024 U.S. Championships, Anzola finished ninth in the all-around and fourth on beam. Following the competition, she was named as a member of the U.S. National Team.

Anzola was selected to compete at the 2024 Tournoi International in Combs-la-Ville, France. With Camie Westerman and Gabrielle Hardie, Anzola won the team silver medal for the U.S. She also qualified for the uneven bars final, finishing sixth.

=== 2025 ===
In June 2025, Anzola competed at the American Classic, finishing 15th in the all-around and 12th on floor exercise. Anzola next competed at the 2025 U.S. Classic, where she won the silver medal on beam behind Lavi Crain, in addition to placing 10th the all-around.

Anzola qualified for and competed at the 2025 U.S. Championships, her final competition as a junior athlete. She gave a consistent performance across both days of competition, scoring 51.900 on Day 1 and 51.950 on Day 2. This earned her the silver medal in the all-around behind Caroline Moreau, in addition to the gold medal on balance beam. She was once again named a member of the U.S. Junior National Team.

Though Anzola competed at the team selection camp for the 2025 Junior World Championships, she was ultimately not selected as a team member.

== Senior career ==
=== 2026 ===
Anzola competing at the 2026 U.S. Championships

Anzola made her senior debut at 2026 Winter Cup, where she placed fifth on balance beam and ninth in the all-around. At the American Classic in June, she finished seventh in the all-around and fourth on floor exercise.

At the 2026 U.S. Classic, Anzola received her first major accolades as a senior gymnast, winning the silver medal on beam behind Skye Blakely, as well as the silver medal on floor behind Reese Esponda. In the all-around, she placed fourth, and her total score allowed her to qualify for the 2026 U.S. Championships.

Anzola placed 15th in the all-around at U.S. Championships, and her best individual event placement was ninth on balance beam.

== Competitive history ==
Competitive history of Isabella Anzola at the junior level
Year	Event	Team	AA	VT	UB	BB	FX
2023	Winter Cup		8			6	
2023	American Classic		5			1st place, gold medalist(s)	4
2023	U.S. Classic		5			3rd place, bronze medalist(s)	3rd place, bronze medalist(s)
2023	U.S. National Championships		17				
2024	Winter Cup		11			2nd place, silver medalist(s)	7
2024	American Classic		3rd place, bronze medalist(s)		7	2nd place, silver medalist(s)	5
2024	Pan American Championships	1st place, gold medalist(s)				1st place, gold medalist(s)	3rd place, bronze medalist(s)
2024	U.S. National Championships		9			4	
2024	Tournoi International	2nd place, silver medalist(s)			6		
2025	American Classic		15				
2025	U.S. Classic		10			2nd place, silver medalist(s)	
2025	U.S. National Championships		2nd place, silver medalist(s)		4	1st place, gold medalist(s)	7

Competitive history of Isabella Anzola at the senior level
Year	Event	Team	AA	VT	UB	BB	FX
2026	Winter Cup		9			5	
2026	American Classic		7				4
2026	U.S. Classic		4			2nd place, silver medalist(s)	2nd place, silver medalist(s)
2026	U.S. National Championships		15				
