= Lila Richardson =

American artistic gymnast (born 2010)

- Richardson at the 2026 Swiss Cup

Personal information
- Born: January 12, 2010 (age 16) Little Rock, Arkansas, U.S.

Gymnastics career
- Discipline: Women's artistic gymnastics
- Country represented: United States; (2026–present)
- College team: Alabama Crimson Tide (2029–2032)
- Club: Metroplex
- Head coach: Marnie Futch
Medal record
Women's artistic gymnastics
Representing United States
Pan American Championships
Gold medal – first place	2026 Rio de Janeiro	Team

Lila Richardson (born January 12, 2010) is an American artistic gymnast. She was part of the gold medal-winning U.S. team at the 2026 Pan American Championships.

== Junior career ==
Richardson competed at the Hopes level from 2021 to 2023. In 2022, she won the national title on balance beam in the 11-12 division. She began competing as a junior in 2024, and she won the bronze medal on balance beam at the 2024 American Classic.

At the 2025 U.S. Championships, Richardson finished 15th in the all-around. Of the individual events, her best placement was 11th on floor exercise.

== Senior career ==
=== 2026 ===
Richardson made her senior debut at the 2026 Winter Cup, where she finished 11th in the all-around.

In May 2026, Richardson was invited to participate in the team selection camp for the Pan American Championships. She was chosen as a team member alongside Charleigh Bullock, Hezly Rivera, Claire Pease, and Simone Rose. Additionally, her performance at the selection camp allowed her to qualify for the U.S. National Championships.

At the Pan American Championships in Rio de Janeiro, Brazil, Richardson smacked her face on the uneven bars just before the start of the team final, resulting in an injury that required on-site sutures. Due to this, she was withdrawn from the remainder of the competition and replaced by traveling alternate Alessia Rosa. The U.S. won the gold medal as a team, and Richardson was awarded a medal as a participating member.

Richardson returned to competition at the 2026 U.S. Classic, where she placed fifth on uneven bars, as well as seventh in the all-around and on balance beam.

In August, Richardson competed at the 2026 U.S. Championships. She finished ninth on uneven bars, sixth on balance beam, and 11th on floor and in the all-around. Following the competition, she was named as a member of the U.S. Women's National Team. She also received an invitation to the team selection camp for the 2026 World Championships.

Richardson competing at the 2026 U.S. National Championships

On September 18, 2026, Richardson announced her commitment to compete for the Alabama Crimson Tide in NCAA gymnastics.

Richardson was chosen to represent the United States at the Paris World Challenge Cup in September 2026, alongside teammate Izzy Stassi. She qualified for the balance beam and floor exercise finals, placing fourth in each. In November, Richardson, as well as Tatum Drusch, Joshua Karnes, and Yul Moldauer, was named to the US team for the Arthur Gander Memorial, an individual competition, and the Swiss Cup, a mixed-team event. Richardson placed seventh overall at the Arthur Gander Memorial, and she also recorded the highest floor exercise score of the competition. At the Swiss Cup, the U.S. team placed fourth.

== Competitive history ==
Competitive history of Lila Richardson at the junior level
Year	Event	Team	AA	VT	UB	BB	FX
2024	American Classic		8		8	3rd place, bronze medalist(s)	
2024	U.S. Classic						
2025	Winter Cup		9		4		7
2025	American Classic		9				
2025	U.S. National Championships		15				11

Competitive history of Lila Richardson at the senior level
Year	Event	Team	AA	VT	UB	BB	FX
2026	Winter Cup		11				
2026	Pan American Championships	1st place, gold medalist(s)					
2026	U.S. Classic		7		5	7	
2026	U.S. National Championships		11		9	6	11
2026	Paris World Challenge Cup					4	4
2026	Arthur Gander Memorial		7				
2026	Swiss Cup	4					
