= Amia Pugh-Banks =

American artistic gymnast (born 2011)

- Pugh-Banks at the 2026 U.S. National Championships

Personal information
- Nickname: Mia
- Born: October 19, 2011 (age 15) Newport News, Virginia, U.S.

Gymnastics career
- Country represented: United States; (2025–present)
- Club: World Class Gymnastics
- Head coach: Tami Harrison
Medal record
Women's artistic gymnastics
Representing the United States
Junior Pan American Championships
Gold medal – first place	2026 Rio de Janeiro	Team
Gold medal – first place	2026 Rio de Janeiro	All-around
Gold medal – first place	2026 Rio de Janeiro	Vault
Gold medal – first place	2026 Rio de Janeiro	Floor exercise

Amia Pugh-Banks (born October 19, 2011) is an American artistic gymnast. She is the 2026 Junior Pan American all-around champion.

== Early life ==
Pugh-Banks was born to Nicole Pugh and Harold Banks, and has two siblings, Azariah Pugh and Zarriyon Pettiford. She began training at World Class Gymnastics at five years old.

== Junior gymnastics career ==
Pugh-Banks won the 2024 HOPES championship for the 13-14 age-group with a score of 49.600 in the all-around. She also won gold on vault, floor exercise and balance beam.

She competed at the 2025 Winter Cup where she placed seventh in the all-around. In July 2025, she competed at the 2025 U.S. Classic, where she won silver on vault, and placed fourth on floor exercise and fifth on uneven bars. She then competed at the 2025 National Championships where she won gold on vault, bronze in the all-around and floor exercise, and placed fifth on uneven bars.

=== 2026 ===
In February, she competed at the 2026 Winter Cup where she won gold on vault and silver in the all-around. The next month she competed at the 2026 City of Jesolo Trophy where she helped team USA win gold in the junior team event. On May 16, 2026, she was selected to represent the United States at the 2026 Pan American Championships. During the event she helped team USA win gold in the team event. Individually she won gold in the all-around, vault, and floor exercise.

In July, she competed at the 2026 U.S. Classic, and placed third in the all-around behind Addalye VanGrinsven and Brooklyn Klauser. The next month she competed at the 2026 U.S. National Championships where she once again placed third in the all-around, this time behind VanGrinsven and Kylie Smith. She also won gold on vault and silver on floor exercise. Following the tournament she was named to the 2026–27 junior national team.

On September 10, 2026, she was selected to represent the United States at the Combs La Ville International Tournament. During this tournament she won three gold medals and one silver medal.

Pugh-Banks competing at the 2026 U.S. National Championships

== Competitive history ==
Competitive History of Amia Pugh-Banks at the Junior Level
Year	Event	Team	AA	VT	UB	BB	FX
2025	Winter Cup		7		8		
2025	American Classic		3rd place, bronze medalist(s)	2nd place, silver medalist(s)			1st place, gold medalist(s)
2025	U.S. Classic		6	2nd place, silver medalist(s)		7	8
2025	U.S. National Championships		3rd place, bronze medalist(s)	1st place, gold medalist(s)	5		3rd place, bronze medalist(s)
2026	Winter Cup		2nd place, silver medalist(s)	1st place, gold medalist(s)	7		4
2026	City of Jesolo Trophy	1st place, gold medalist(s)	6	8			
2026	Pan American Championships	1st place, gold medalist(s)	1st place, gold medalist(s)	1st place, gold medalist(s)			1st place, gold medalist(s)
2026	U.S. Classic		3rd place, bronze medalist(s)	1st place, gold medalist(s)	1st place, gold medalist(s)	15	4
2026	U.S. National Championships		3rd place, bronze medalist(s)	1st place, gold medalist(s)	21	10	2nd place, silver medalist(s)
2026	International Tournament	1st place, gold medalist(s)	2nd place, silver medalist(s)	1st place, gold medalist(s)			1st place, gold medalist(s)
