= 2026 Winter Cup =

Artistic gymnastics competition in the USA

- Venue: Kentucky International Convention Center
- Location: Louisville, Kentucky, U.S.
- Dates: February 21–22, 2026

The 2026 Winter Cup was an artistic gymnastics competition held at the Kentucky International Convention Center in Louisville, Kentucky, on February 21–22, 2026. As in recent years, the competition included men's and women's gymnastics.

== Background ==
The event was held in Louisville, which hosted the 2023, 2024, and 2025 Winter Cup. Previously the Nastia Liukin Cup had been held in conjunction with the Winter Cup but this year it was held alongside the American Cup.

== Competition schedule ==
The competition had senior and junior competitions for both women's and men's disciplines. The competition schedule was (all times in eastern).

Saturday, February 21:

- Elite Team Cup – 1:30 p.m.
- Winter Cup – Senior Men – 7 p.m.

Sunday, February 22:

- Winter Cup – Junior Women – 12 p.m.
- Winter Cup – Senior Women – 5:30 p.m.

== Medalists ==
Event	Gold	Silver	Bronze
Senior Women
Individual all-around	Hezly Rivera	Charleigh Bullock	Claire Pease
Vault	Claire Pease	Izzy Stassi	Not awarded
Uneven bars	Charleigh Bullock	Hezly Rivera	Greta Krob
Balance beam	Hezly Rivera	Claire Pease	Charleigh Bullock
Floor	Hezly Rivera	Reese Esponda	Simone Rose
Junior Women
Individual all-around	Kylie Smith	Amia Pugh-Banks	Addalye VanGrinsven
Vault	Amia Pugh-Banks Addalye VanGrinsven	Not awarded	Kylie Smith
Uneven bars	Kylie Smith	Sydney Williams	Aulya Daniels
Balance beam	Audrey VanGrinsven	Sofie Davtyan	Espy Chang
Floor	Kylie Smith	Espy Chang Addalye VanGrinsven	Not awarded
Senior Men
Individual all-around	Fred Richard	Yul Moldauer	David Shamah
Floor	Fred Richard	Charlie Larson	Riley Loos
Pommel horse	Parker Thackston	Preston Ngai	Fred Richard
Rings	Christopher Hiser	Yul Moldauer	Fred Richard
Vault	Garrett Schooley	Sasha Bogonosiuk	Jackson Harrison
Parallel bars	Yul Moldauer	David Shamah	Joshua Karnes
Horizontal bar	Danila Leykin	Crew Bold	Fred Richard

== National team and international assignments ==
The United States delegation for the 2026 American Cup was decided at the conclusion of this competition; the selection committees chose Asher Hong, Danila Leykin, Yul Moldauer, Charleigh Bullock, Hezly Rivera, and Claire Pease.

Members of the senior women's national team are presented following the competition

Following the conclusion of the competition, the following individuals were also named to the men's national team: Crew Bold, Taylor Burkhart, Brandon Dang, Asher Hong, Patrick Hoopes, Josh Karnes, Danila Leykin, Riley Loos, Brody Malone, Yul Moldauer, Kameron Nelson, Dante Reive, Frederick Richard, David Shamah, Parker Thackston, and Donnell Whittenburg. Additionally Sasha Bogonosiuk, Jun Iwai, Preston Ngai, and Nathan Roman retained their spots on the senior development team.

The following individuals were named to the senior women's national team: Skye Blakely, Charleigh Bullock, Dulcy Caylor, Reese Esponda, Jayla Hang, Gabrielle Hardie, Greta Krob, Caroline Moreau, Claire Pease, Hezly Rivera, Joscelyn Roberson, Simone Rose, and Leanne Wong.

The following individuals were named to the junior women's national team: Espy Chang, Aulya Daniels, Avery Haines, Amariah Moore, Amia Pugh-Banks, Kylie Smith, Cassandra Tan, Addalye VanGrinsven, Audrey VanGrinsven, and Sydney Williams.

== Participants ==
=== Men ===
- Drake Andrews
- Fuzzy Benas
- Sasha Bogonosiuk
- Crew Bold
- Arun Chhetri
- Taylor Christopulos
- Tate Costa
- Lincoln Dubin
- Carson Eshleman
- Kristian Grahovski
- Zach Green
- Jackson Harrison
- Christopher Hiser
- Jun Iwai
- Maksim Kan
- Joshua Karnes
- Cooper Kim
- Charlie Larson
- Danila Leykin
- Riley Loos
- Kiran Mandava
- Aaronson Mansberger
- Yul Moldauer
- Preston Ngai
- Alex Nitache
- Max Odden
- Jesse-Lee Pakele
- Kaleb Palacio
- David Ramirez
- Ori Reilly
- Fred Richard
- Nathan Roman
- Anthony Ruscheinsky
- Garrett Schooley
- David Shamah
- Hunter Simpson
- Landon Simpson
- Brian Solomon
- Parker Thackston
- Kai Uemura
- Shane Wiskus

=== Women ===
Senior

- Isabella Anzola
- Charleigh Bullock
- Ally Damelio
- Reese Esponda
- Addy Fulcher
- Gabrielle Hardie
- Greta Krob
- Annalisa Milton
- Caroline Moreau
- Claire Pease
- Lila Richardson
- Hezly Rivera
- Alessia Rosa
- Simone Rose
- Kaylee Sath
- Izzy Stassi

Junior

- Arjun Raghoenath
- Espy Chang
- Auyla Daniels
- Sofie Davtyan
- Chrysette Diggs
- Eva Doherty
- Sadie Drake
- Madelyn Eagle
- Carlos Fronc
- Avery Haines
- Brooklyn Klauser
- Anslee McCauley
- Jaysha McClendon
- Amariah Moore
- Amia Pugh-Banks
- Alexis Reiner
- Jazzy Saravia
- Kylie Smith
- Ansley Stevens
- Sage Stiggers
- Cassandra Tan
- Addalye VanGrinsven
- Audrey VanGrinsven
- Sydney Williams
