= Addalye VanGrinsven =

American artistic gymnast

- VanGrinsven at the 2026 U.S. National Championships

Personal information
- Full name: Addalye Raye VanGrinsven
- Born: August 6, 2011 (age 15) Maple Grove, Minnesota, U.S.

Gymnastics career
- Discipline: Women's artistic gymnastics
- Country represented: United States; (2025–present)
- Training location: Bothell, Washington
- Club: Pacific Reign
- Head coach: Cale Robinson
- Assistant coach: Steph Gentry
Medal record
Representing the United States
Junior Pan American Games
Gold medal – first place	2025 Asunción	Team
Gold medal – first place	2025 Asunción	Vault
Silver medal – second place	2025 Asunción	Balance beam
Bronze medal – third place	2025 Asunción	All-around
Bronze medal – third place	2025 Asunción	Floor exercise
Junior Pan American Championships
Gold medal – first place	2026 Rio de Janeiro	Team
Silver medal – second place	2026 Rio de Janeiro	Vault
Silver medal – second place	2026 Rio de Janeiro	Balance beam
Bronze medal – third place	2026 Rio de Janeiro	Uneven bars
Bronze medal – third place	2026 Rio de Janeiro	Floor exercise

Addalye Raye VanGrinsven (born August 6, 2011) is an American artistic gymnast. She is the 2025 Junior Pan American Games vault champion and the 2026 U.S. Junior National Champion.

== Early life ==
VanGrinsven was born in Maple Grove, Minnesota to Adam and Molly VanGrinsven. She has three siblings, one of whom is also a gymnast. In late 2024 her family moved to Seattle, Washington so VanGrinsven could further her gymnastics training at Pacific Reign.

== Junior gymnastics career ==
VanGrinsven made her junior elite debut at the 2025 Winter Cup where she placed third in the all-around behind Lavi and Vivi Crain. The following month she made her international debut at International Gymnix where she helped team USA win silver in the team event behind France. Individually she won gold on vault and bronze on floor exercise. In April she competed at the 2025 City of Jesolo Trophy, where she helped team USA win gold in the team event.

VanGrinsven competed at the 2025 U.S. Classic where she won silver on floor exercise, bronze on vault, and finished fourth in the all-around. As a result she was selected to represent the United States at the 2025 Junior Pan American Games alongside Charleigh Bullock, Lavi Crain, and Kylie Smith.

At the 2025 National Championships VanGrinsven only competed on day one of the competition in order to rest for the Junior Pan American Games, taking place less than two weeks later. At the Junior Pan American Games VanGrinsven helped the United States win gold in the team event and she won bronze in the all-around behind teammate Bullock and Julieta Lucas of Argentina. Additionally she advanced to all four apparatus event finals. On the first day of event finals she won gold on vault and placed fourth on uneven bars. On the final day of event finals she won silver on balance beam and tied for bronze on floor exercise.

VanGrinsven was selected to represent the United States at the 2026 Pan American Championships. She contributed to the USA's gold-medal finish and individually she won four medals, a silver on vault and balance beam and a bronze on uneven bars and floor exercise. At the 2026 U.S. Classic, VanGrinsven won the junior all-around title. At the 2026 U.S. National Championships, she won the junior national all-around title.

== Competitive history ==
Competitive history of Addalye VanGrinsven
Year	Event	Team	AA	VT	UB	BB	FX
2025	Winter Cup		3rd place, bronze medalist(s)		7	6	3rd place, bronze medalist(s)
2025	International Gymnix	2nd place, silver medalist(s)		1st place, gold medalist(s)			3rd place, bronze medalist(s)
2025	City of Jesolo Trophy	1st place, gold medalist(s)					
2025	American Classic		10	3rd place, bronze medalist(s)	26	2nd place, silver medalist(s)	5
2025	U.S. Classic		4	3rd place, bronze medalist(s)	11	11	2nd place, silver medalist(s)
2025	Junior Pan American Games	1st place, gold medalist(s)	3rd place, bronze medalist(s)	1st place, gold medalist(s)	4	2nd place, silver medalist(s)	3rd place, bronze medalist(s)
2026	Winter Cup		3rd place, bronze medalist(s)	1st place, gold medalist(s)	4	13	2nd place, silver medalist(s)
2026	City of Jesolo Trophy	1st place, gold medalist(s)	3rd place, bronze medalist(s)	3rd place, bronze medalist(s)			4
2026	Junior Pan American Championships	1st place, gold medalist(s)		2nd place, silver medalist(s)	3rd place, bronze medalist(s)	2nd place, silver medalist(s)	3rd place, bronze medalist(s)
2026	U.S. Classic		1st place, gold medalist(s)	3rd place, bronze medalist(s)	3rd place, bronze medalist(s)	4	1st place, gold medalist(s)
2026	U.S. National Championships		1st place, gold medalist(s)	2nd place, silver medalist(s)	9	2nd place, silver medalist(s)	1st place, gold medalist(s)
