= 2025 U.S. Classic =

Gymnastics competition

- Venue: Now Arena
- Location: Hoffman Estates, Illinois
- Dates: July 18–19, 2025

The 2025 U.S. Classic was the 41st edition of the U.S. Classic gymnastics competition. The event took place on July 18–19, 2025 at the Now Arena in Hoffman Estates, Illinois.

== Schedule ==
All times are in Central Time Zone.

- Hopes Championships – Friday, July 18 at 2:00 PM
- Junior Women – Friday, July 18 at 7:00 PM
- Senior Women session 1 – Saturday, July 19 at 2:00 PM
- Senior Women session 2 – Saturday, July 19 at 7:00 PM

== Medalists ==
Event	Gold	Silver	Bronze
Senior
All-around	Claire Pease	Simone Rose	Joscelyn Roberson
Vault	Claire Pease	—N/a	
Uneven bars	Myli Lew	Simone Rose	Claire Pease Alicia Zhou
Balance beam	Ashlee Sullivan	Harlow Buddendeck	Claire Pease
Floor	Reese Esponda	Hezly Rivera	Gabrielle Hardie
Junior
All-around	Lavi Crain	Charleigh Bullock	Kylie Smith
Vault	Lavi Crain	Amia Pugh-Banks	Addalye VanGrinsven
Uneven bars	Charleigh Bullock	Lavi Crain	Addy Fulcher
Balance beam	Lavi Crain	Isabella Anzola	Greta Krob
Floor	Caroline Moreau	Kylie Smith Addalye VanGrinsven	Not awarded

== Participants ==
=== Senior ===
- Sage Bradford (WOGA)
- Harlow Buddendeck (RGA)
- Dulcy Caylor (WCC)
- Ally Damelio (San Mateo)
- Jordis Eichman (WCC)
- Reese Esponda (WCC)
- Catherine Guy (Pacific Reign)
- Jayla Hang (Pacific Reign)
- Gabrielle Hardie (Twin City Twisters)
- Myli Lew (San Mateo)
- Nola Matthews (Airborne)
- Annalisa Milton (GAGE)
- Malea Milton (GAGE)
- Avery Moll (Buckeye)
- Claire Pease (WOGA)
- Brooke Pierson (WCC)
- Hezly Rivera (WOGA)
- Joscelyn Roberson (Arkansas)
- Alessia Rosa (Hill's)
- Simone Rose (Pacific Reign)
- Izzy Stassi (Gym X-Treme)
- Ashlee Sullivan (Metroplex)
- Tiana Sumanasekera (WCC)
- Maliha Tressel (Twin City Twisters)
- Audree Valdenarro (Gymnastics Olympica)
- Sabrina Visconti (Nohas Gymnastics Academy)
- Camie Westerman (Hill's)
- Halle Shea Wittenberg (Cypress Academy)
- Leanne Wong (Florida)
- Alicia Zhou (Love Gymnastics)
