= 2026 U.S. Classic =

Gymnastics competition

- Venue: PeoplesBank Arena
- Location: Hartford, Connecticut
- Dates: July 17–18, 2026

The 2026 U.S. Classic was the 42nd edition of the U.S. Classic gymnastics competition. The event took place on July 17–18, 2026 at the PeoplesBank Arena in Hartford, Connecticut.

== Schedule ==
All times are in Eastern Time Zone.

- Hopes Championships – Friday, July 17 at 7:00 PM
- Junior Women – Saturday, July 18 at 2:00 PM
- Senior Women – Saturday, July 18 at 7:00 PM

== Medalists ==
Event	Gold	Silver	Bronze
Senior
All-around	Reese Esponda	Jade Carey	Zoey Molomo
Vault	Jade Carey	Izzy Stassi	Tatum Drusch
Uneven bars	Skye Blakely	Izzy Stassi	Simone Rose
Balance beam	Skye Blakely	Isabella Anzola	Reese Esponda
Floor	Reese Esponda	Isabella Anzola Jade Carey Izzy Stassi	Not awarded
Junior
All-around	Addalye VanGrinsven	Brooklyn Klauser	Amia Pugh-Banks
Vault	Amia Pugh-Banks	Bailynn Kasprzak	Addalye VanGrinsven
Uneven bars	Amia Pugh-Banks Paisley Ritger	Not awarded	Addalye VanGrinsven
Balance beam	Brooklyn Klauser	Sydney Williams	Claire Ekart
Floor	Addalye VanGrinsven	Kylie Smith Sydney Williams	Not awarded

== Senior results ==
Rank	Gymnast	Gym	Vault (gymnastics)	Uneven bars	Balance beam	Floor (gymnastics)	Total
1st place, gold medalist(s)	Reese Esponda	World Champions Centre	14.150	13.050	13.750	13.950	54.900
2nd place, silver medalist(s)	Jade Carey	Oregon State University	14.300	13.550	12.900	13.300	54.050
3rd place, bronze medalist(s)	Zoey Molomo	Metroplex	14.000	12.950	13.700	13.250	53.900
4	Isabella Anzola	WOGA	13.200	12.800	13.800	13.300	53.100
5	Izzy Stassi	University of Oklahoma	13.700	13.650	11.900	13.300	52.550
6	Greta Krob	Iowa Gym-Nest	13.350	13.100	13.300	12.700	52.450
7	Lila Richardson	Metroplex	13.100	13.450	13.050	12.800	52.400
8	Caroline Moreau	Texas Dreams	12.600	13.400	13.000	13.250	52.250
8	Ally Damelio	San Mateo Gymnastics	13.650	12.800	13.050	12.750	52.250
10	Alessia Rosa	Hill's Gymnastics	13.900	12.400	12.500	12.650	51.450
11	Elaina Sliney	Cincinnati Gymnastics	13.250	12.350	12.400	12.500	50.500
12	Tatum Drusch	Flips Gymnastics	13.750	13.350	9.900	13.150	50.150
13	Trinity Wood	Capital Gymnastics	13.300	12.750	10.700	12.700	49.450
14	Addy Fulcher	Georgia Elite	13.150	12.000	11.000	12.950	49.100
15	Dulcy Caylor	World Champions Centre	13.000	11.900	12.100	10.950	47.950
16	Aki Tanda	World Champions Centre	13.350	12.200	11.400	10.600	47.550
–	Simone Rose	Pacific Reign	13.600	13.600	11.750	–	38.950
–	Skye Blakely	University of Florida	–	14.100	14.250	–	28.350
–	Jasmine Robles	WOGA	13.400	–	13.000	–	26.400
–	Katelyn Ohashi	Pacific Reign	–	–	13.200	13.200	26.400
–	Leanne Wong	University of Florida	–	–	11.900	–	11.900

=== Vault ===
In order to be eligible for vault medals at the senior level, two vaults had to be performed. Below are the three gymnasts who performed two vaults.

Position	Gymnast	Vault 1				Vault 2				Bonus	Total
Position	Gymnast	D Score	E Score	Pen.	Score 1	D Score	E Score	Pen.	Score 2	Bonus	Total
1st place, gold medalist(s)	Jade Carey	5.0	9.300		14.300	4.8	9.050		13.850	0.2	14.275
2nd place, silver medalist(s)	Izzy Stassi	4.6	9.100		13.700	4.0	9.400		13.400		13.550
3rd place, bronze medalist(s)	Tatum Drusch	4.6	9.150		13.750	3.8	8.850		12.650		13.200

== Participants ==
=== Senior ===
- Isabella Anzola
- Skye Blakely
- Jade Carey
- Dulcy Caylor
- Ally Damelio
- Tatum Drusch
- Reese Esponda
- Addy Fulcher
- Greta Krob
- Zoey Molomo
- Caroline Moreau
- Katelyn Ohashi
- Lila Richardson
- Jasmine Robles
- Alessia Rosa
- Simone Rose
- Elaina Sliney
- Izzy Stassi
- Aki Tanda
- Leanne Wong
- Trinity Wood

=== Junior ===
- Gianna Arthur
- Hadley Bird
- Espy Chang
- Chrysette Diggs
- Eva Doherty
- Sadie Drake
- Madelyn Eagle
- Claire Ekart
- Avery Haines
- Bailynn Kasprzak
- Brooklyn Klauser
- Maya Kosarikova
- Anslee McCauley
- Annabel Melnyk
- Amariah Moore
- Amia Pugh-Banks
- Alexis Reiner
- Paisley Ritger
- Jazzy Saravia
- Kylie Smith
- Ansley Stevens
- Cassandra Tan
- Lily Ticknor
- Addalye VanGrinsven
- Audrey VanGrinsven
- Tenley Wade
- Sydney Williams
