= Reese Esponda =

American artistic gymnast (born 2008)

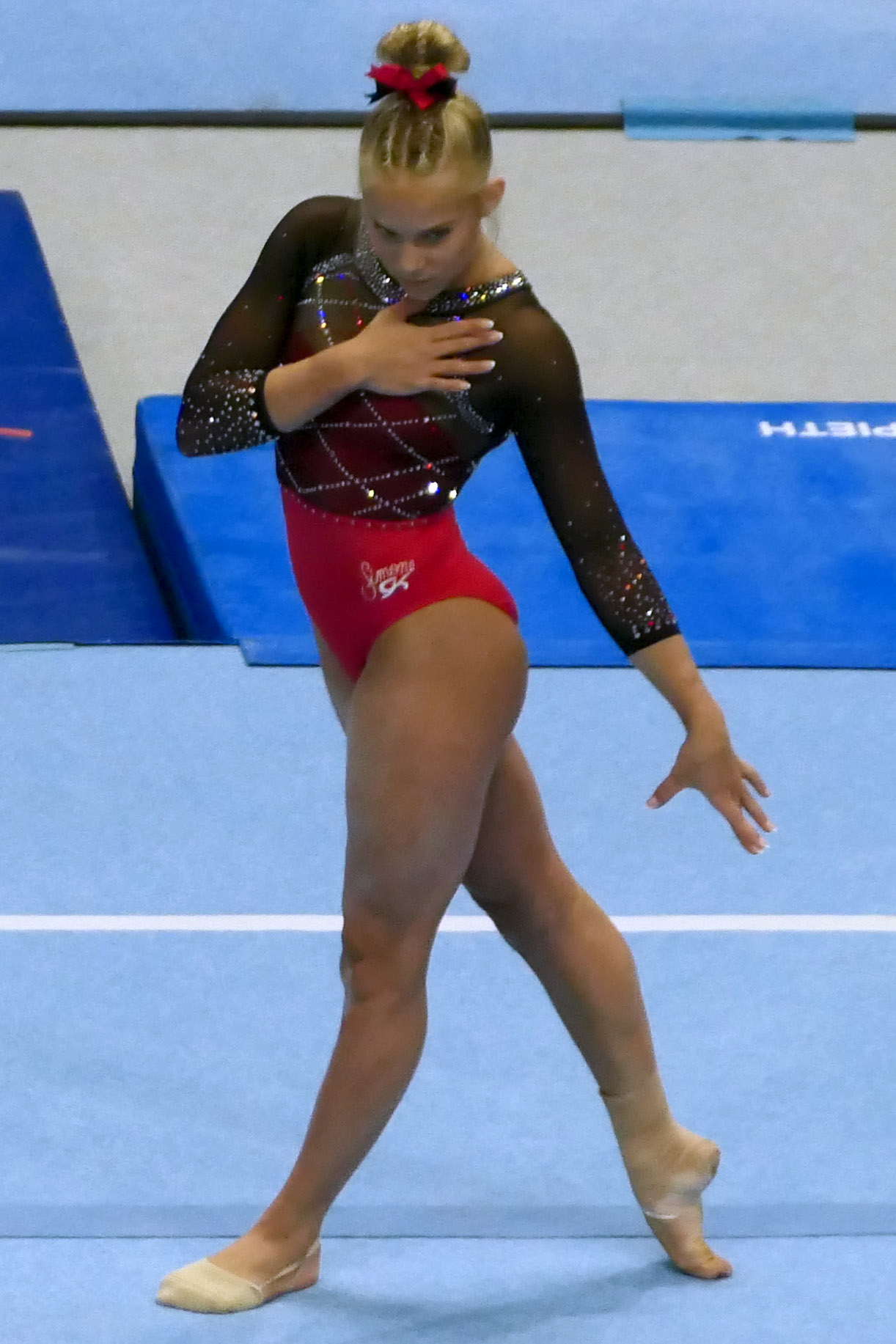
- Esponda at the 2024 U.S. Classic

Personal information
- Born: October 28, 2008 (age 17) Helena, Montana, US

Gymnastics career
- Discipline: Women's artistic gymnastics
- Country represented: United States; (2023–2024, 2026–present)
- College team: LSU Tigers (2027–2030)
- Gym: World Champions Centre
- Head coach: Patrick Keins
- Assistant coach: Daymon Jones
- Former coaches: Laurent Landi; Cécile Canqueteau-Landi
Medal record
Representing the United States
World Championships
Silver medal – second place	2026 Rotterdam	Team
Silver medal – second place	2026 Rotterdam	Floor exercise

Reese Esponda (born October 28, 2008) is an American artistic gymnast. She is the 2026 World silver medalist on floor exercise.

== Junior gymnastics career ==
Esponda began gymnastics at age 3 at Gym 406 in Helena, Montana. In 2020, she moved to Roots Gymnastics and Dance in Missoula, Montana.

In 2021, Esponda competed at the Parkettes National Qualifier and Brestyan's National Qualifier.

In 2022, she competed at the Hopes Classic where she won the bronze on vault. A few weeks later, she competed in the Hopes Championships where she won gold on vault and the balance beam and won the silver in the all-around.

In 2023, she competed at the Vegas Cup National Qualifier where she won bronze on vault and gold on the floor exercise. She won the bronze on balance beam, floor exercise, and in the all-around at the WOGA Classic. She also won gold on the floor exercise at the American Classic and the US National Championships. She also competed at the US Classic and the Winter Cup.

== Senior gymnastics career ==
=== 2024 ===
In early 2024, Esponda moved to train at World Champions Centre in Spring, Texas. She competed at the Winter Cup and the WOGA Classic, winning gold on vault in the latter. She competed at her first international assignment at the Baku World Cup where she only competed on the floor exercise, qualifying in 2nd, but ultimately placing 7th. She also competed at the Winter Cup, the US Selection Meet, the US Classic, and the US National Championships.

=== 2025 ===
In 2025, she competed at the Coastal Realm National Qualifier, winning silver on vault, gold on the floor exercise, and silver in the all-around. She also won gold on the floor exercise at US Classic. She competed at the US National Championships where she placed 16th overall. The same year, she announced her commitment to joining the LSU Tigers.

=== 2026 ===
In February, she competed at the Winter Cup, where she won the silver on the floor exercise and placed 4th overall. Esponda won the all-around at U.S. Classic with a 54.900 and finished first on floor exercise and third on balance beam.

In October she was selected to compete at the 2026 World Championships alongside Claire Pease, Charleigh Bullock, Skye Blakely, Hezly Rivera, and Dulcy Caylor. While there she helped the United States qualify to the team final and individually she qualified to floor exercise final. During the team final she contributed solely on floor exercise towards the United States's second place finish. In the floor final, Esponda won the silver medal behind teammate Pease and ahead of Maïana Prat of France.

== Competitive history ==
Competitive history of Reese Esponda at the junior level
Year	Event	Team	AA	VT	UB	BB	FX
2022	All-American National Qualifier		4	7	4	6	4
2022	Metroplex National Qualifier		15	9	13	13	16
2022	HOPEs Classic		9	3rd place, bronze medalist(s)	9	6	15
2022	HOPEs Championships		2nd place, silver medalist(s)	1st place, gold medalist(s)	5	1st place, gold medalist(s)	7
2023	Vegas Cup National Qualifier		4	3rd place, bronze medalist(s)	11	16	1st place, gold medalist(s)
2023	Winter Cup		11	13	13	17	4
2023	American Classic		4	12	7	5	1st place, gold medalist(s)
2023	U.S. Classic		19	11	28	15	16
2023	U.S. National Championships		6	9	5	5	1st place, gold medalist(s)

Competitive history of Reese Esponda at the senior level
Year	Event	Team	AA	VT	UB	BB	FX
2024	WOGA Classic		6	1st place, gold medalist(s)	4	10	
2024	Winter Cup		7	5	21	14	4
2024	Baku World Cup						7
2024	U.S. Selection Meet		12	4	9	14	9
2024	U.S. Classic		19		28	31	6
2024	U.S. National Championships		28	15	34	32	8
2025	Coastal Realm National Qualifier		2nd place, silver medalist(s)	2nd place, silver medalist(s)	7	4	1st place, gold medalist(s)
2025	U.S. Classic		5	6	21	15	1st place, gold medalist(s)
2025	U.S. National Championships		14	8	19	18	6
2026	Winter Cup		4		6	9	2nd place, silver medalist(s)
2026	City of Jesolo Trophy	1st place, gold medalist(s)	5	7			1st place, gold medalist(s)
2026	U.S. Classic		1st place, gold medalist(s)		9	3rd place, bronze medalist(s)	1st place, gold medalist(s)
2026	U.S. National Championships		4		7	13	1st place, gold medalist(s)
2026	World Championships	2nd place, silver medalist(s)					2nd place, silver medalist(s)

== Personal life ==
Esponda was born in Helena, Montana, on October 28, 2008, to her parents Mark and Lindsay Esponda. She has three siblings named Kendall, Josie, and Drew. Esponda has stated that she was inspired to begin gymnastics after watching Gabby Douglas compete at the 2012 Summer Olympics in London.
