= Izzy Stassi =

American artistic gymnast (born 2008)

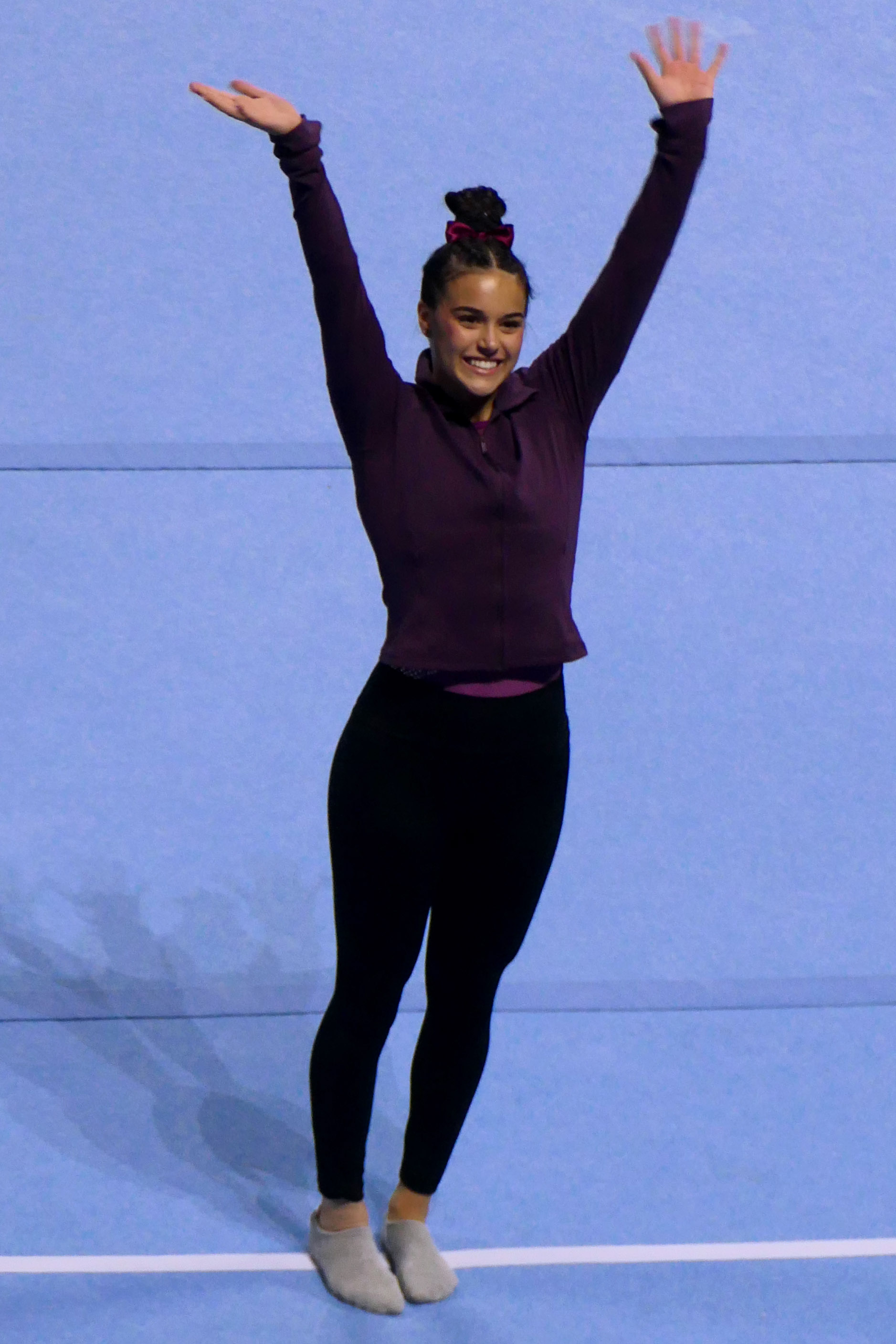
- Stassi at the 2024 U.S. Classic

Personal information
- Full name: Isabel Stassi
- Born: September 21, 2008 (age 18) Middleburg Heights, Ohio, U.S.

Gymnastics career
- Discipline: Women's artistic gymnastics
- Country represented: United States; (2022–2024, 2026–present)
- College team: Oklahoma Sooners (2027–2030)
- Club: Gym X-Treme
- Head coach: K.J. Kindler
Medal record
Women's artistic gymnastics
Representing United States
Junior World Championships
Silver medal – second place	2023 Antalya	Team
FIG World Cup
Event	1st	2nd	3rd
World Challenge Cup	0	2	0
Total	0	2	0

Isabel "Izzy" Stassi (born September 21, 2008) is an American artistic gymnast. She was part of the silver-medal winning team at the 2023 Junior World Championships. Additionally, she was the 2023 junior national vault champion. Stassi is currently competing for the Oklahoma Sooners in NCAA gymnastics.

== Junior career ==
=== 2021 ===
Stassi's first major competition as a junior athlete was the 2021 U.S. Classic, where she placed fourth in the all-around. She also finished fifth on uneven bars and sixth on balance beam.

She also competed at the 2021 National Championships, where her best results were fourth on uneven bars and eighth on floor exercise.

=== 2022 ===
In July 2022, Stassi competed at the trials for the Pan American Championships team, though she did not advance past the first day and was not named to the team.

At the American Classic, Stassi received her first accolades as junior elite at the national level, winning the silver medal on vault and the bronze medal on floor exercise. At the U.S. Classic weeks later, she once again finished in the top five in the all-around. She also secured top-8 finishes on vault and uneven bars.

Stassi won the silver medal on floor exercise at the 2022 National Championships, just behind Tiana Sumanasekera. She also placed fifth in the all-around.

=== 2023 ===
Stassi's first international meet was in March 2023 at the U.S.-Canada Junior Friendly. She won the silver medal in the all-around behind Hezly Rivera, as well as the bronze medal on balance beam.

Later that month, Stassi represented the United States at the 2023 Junior World Championships, alongside teammates Rivera and Jayla Hang. The U.S. team won the silver medal behind Japan and ahead of Italy. Individually, Stassi received the fourth-highest all-around score of the qualification round and was the United States' top all-around qualifier. She also qualified for the vault final in first place. However, she was unable to compete either final due to injury.

In August, Stassi competed at the U.S. Classic, where she won the gold medal on vault.

Stassi competed at the 2023 U.S. Championships, her final competition as a junior athlete. She took the national title on vault, as well as the bronze medal in the all-around behind Hezly Rivera and Kieryn Finnell.

== Senior career ==
=== 2024 ===
Stassi's first senior season was significantly limited by an ankle fracture. She participated in the 2024 American Classic and U.S. Classic, though she only competed on vault and uneven bars at both competitions.

Stassi (third from right) competing at the 2024 U.S. Classic

On September 16, 2024, Stassi announced her commitment to compete for the Oklahoma Sooners in NCAA gymnastics.

=== 2025 ===
Stassi made her senior all-around debut at the 2025 Winter Cup, ranking fifteenth overall as well as seventh on vault.

At the American Classic in June, she won the gold medal on both vault and floor exercise, as well as silver in the all-around.

In August, Stassi competed at her first senior U.S. Championships. She won the bronze medal on vault, in addition to placing twelfth in the all-around and eighth on floor.

=== 2026 ===
Stassi competed on all four events at the 2026 Winter Cup, winning the silver medal on vault and placing sixth on floor exercise. In July, she competed at the U.S. Classic, her first competition working with Oklahoma Sooners coaches K.J. Kindler and Lou Ball. In addition to placing fifth in the all-around, she won the silver medal on vault, uneven bars, and floor exercise. Her all-around performance allowed her to secure a spot at the 2026 U.S. Championships in August. Stassi won the bronze medal on vault at the 2026 U.S. Championships. Additionally, she placed fourth on uneven bars and eighth in the all-around, tying with Caroline Moreau. Based on her performance, she was named as a member of the U.S. Women's National Team.

Along with teammate Lila Richardson, Stassi was chosen to compete at the 2026 Paris World Challenge Cup. She won silver on vault and floor exercise behind Lisa Vaelen and Maïana Prat respectively.

== Competitive history ==
Competitive history of Izzy Stassi at the junior level
Year	Event	Team	AA	VT	UB	BB	FX
2021	American Classic			6	8		
2021	U.S. Classic		4		5	6	
2021	U.S. National Championships		11	4			8
2022	American Classic		6	2nd place, silver medalist(s)		6	3rd place, bronze medalist(s)
2022	U.S. Classic		5	8	6		
2022	U.S. National Championships		5	5	8		2nd place, silver medalist(s)
2023	Winter Cup		6	5	4		4
2023	U.S.-Canada Junior Friendly		2nd place, silver medalist(s)			3rd place, bronze medalist(s)	
2023	Junior World Championships	2nd place, silver medalist(s)	WD	WD			
2023	U.S. Classic		14	1st place, gold medalist(s)		4	
2023	U.S. National Championships		3rd place, bronze medalist(s)	1st place, gold medalist(s)	5	6	5

Competitive history of Izzy Stassi at the senior level
Year	Event	Team	AA	VT	UB	BB	FX
2024	American Classic						
2024	U.S. Classic						
2025	Winter Cup		15	7			
2025	American Classic		2nd place, silver medalist(s)	1st place, gold medalist(s)		4	1st place, gold medalist(s)
2025	U.S. National Championships		12	3rd place, bronze medalist(s)			8
2026	Winter Cup		14	2nd place, silver medalist(s)			6
2026	U.S. Classic		5	2nd place, silver medalist(s)	2nd place, silver medalist(s)	15	2nd place, silver medalist(s)
2026	U.S. National Championships		8	3rd place, bronze medalist(s)	4	9	9
2026	Paris World Challenge Cup			2nd place, silver medalist(s)			2nd place, silver medalist(s)
