= 2026 U.S. National Gymnastics Championships =

- Venue: Mortgage Matchup Center
- Location: Phoenix, Arizona; United States
- Date: August 6–9, 2026

The 2026 U.S. National Gymnastics Championships, known as the 2026 Xfinity U.S. Gymnastics Championships, was the 62nd edition of the U.S. National Gymnastics Championships. The competition was held at the Mortgage Matchup Center in Phoenix, Arizona from August 6–9, 2026.

At the event, Frederick Richard won his first men's national all-around title, while Hezly Rivera won her second all-around women's national title.

== Competition schedule ==
The competition was as scheduled (in mountain standard time / pacific daylight time):

- Thursday, August 6: Men's gymnastics Day 1 – juniors at 1:30 p.m. and seniors at 7:00 p.m.
- Friday, August 7: Women's gymnastics Day 1 – juniors at 12:05 p.m. and seniors session 2 at 7:00 p.m.
- Saturday, August 8: Men's gymnastics Day 2 – juniors at 10:30 a.m. and seniors at 4:30 p.m.
- Sunday, August 9: Women's gymnastics Day 2 – juniors at 10:00 a.m. and seniors session 2 at 3:00 p.m.

The event was broadcast on NBC Sports and CNBC and live-streamed on USA Gymnastics' YouTube channel and Peacock.

== Sponsorship ==
Xfinity, the sponsor of the previous year's event, continued their sponsorship in 2026.

== Medalists ==
Event	Gold	Silver	Bronze
Senior Women
Individual all-around	Hezly Rivera	Claire Pease	Charleigh Bullock
Vault	Jade Carey	Claire Pease	Izzy Stassi
Uneven bars	Claire Pease	Skye Blakely	Charleigh Bullock
Balance beam	Hezly Rivera	Claire Pease	Caroline Moreau
Floor	Reese Esponda	Hezly Rivera	Jade Carey
Junior Women
Individual all-around	Addalye VanGrinsven	Kylie Smith	Amia Pugh-Banks
Vault	Amia Pugh-Banks	Addalye VanGrinsven	Kylie Smith
Uneven bars	Sydney Williams	Eva Doherty	Vivi Crain Avery Haines
Balance beam	Anslee McCauley	Vivi Crain Addalye VanGrinsven	—N/a
Floor	Addalye VanGrinsven	Amia Pugh-Banks	Kylie Smith
Senior Men
Individual all-around	Frederick Richard	Shane Wiskus	Danila Leykin
Floor	Frederick Richard	Jun Iwai	Kameron Nelson
Pommel horse	Patrick Hoopes	Brandon Dang	Parker Thackston
Rings	Asher Cohen	Kameron Nelson	Nicolas Kuebler
Vault	Kameron Nelson	Alexandru Nitache	Garrett Schooley
Parallel bars	Yul Moldauer	David Shamah	Danila Leykin
Horizontal bar	Cooper Kim	Danila Leykin	Crew Bold
Junior Men (17–18)
Individual all-around	London Norris	Hunter Egan	Jake Wazolek
Junior Men (15–16)
Individual all-around	Elijah Connor	William Rebar	Bo McCrea

== Results ==
=== Men ===
USA Gymnastics Men's Program Committee approved the use of a Senior Exponential Bonus based on a gymnast's difficulty score for this competition. Below are a gymnast's scores based on the FIG's Code of Points with the additional domestic bonus noted in parentheses below the FIG score.

Rank	Gymnast	Floor (gymnastics)	Pommel horse	Rings (gymnastics)	Vault (gymnastics)	Parallel bars	Horizontal bar	Day total	Total
1st place, gold medalist(s)	Frederick Richard	14.350 (+0.408)	13.100 (+0.305)	13.950 (+0.305)	13.600	14.500 (+0.408)	13.700	82.900 (+1.426)	170.015 (Note: Richard incurred a 0.3 deduction on each day of competition for wearing an improper uniform)
1st place, gold medalist(s)	Frederick Richard	13.750 (+0.408)	14.150 (+0.513)	13.600 (+0.305)	13.500	14.250 (+0.408)	14.700 (+0.305)	83.750 (+1.939)	170.015
2nd place, silver medalist(s)	Shane Wiskus	13.550	13.250	13.850 (+0.202)	14.300	14.500 (+0.305)	13.250	82.700 (+0.507)	167.964
2nd place, silver medalist(s)	Shane Wiskus	14.150	13.400	14.300 (+0.202)	13.650	14.550 (+0.305)	14.200	84.250 (+0.507)	167.964
3rd place, bronze medalist(s)	Danila Leykin	13.800	14.100 (+0.202)	12.700	14.150	14.100 (+0.513)	14.200 (+0.408)	83.050 (+1.123)	167.001
3rd place, bronze medalist(s)	Danila Leykin	11.650	14.300 (+0.202)	12.500	14.150	14.550 (+0.513)	14.450 (+0.513)	81.600 (+1.228)	167.001
4	Joshua Karnes	13.550	13.400 (+0.513)	13.000	12.550 (+0.471)	13.850 (+0.408)	13.150 (+0.833)	79.500 (+2.225)	164.552
4	Joshua Karnes	13.650	13.150 (+0.513)	13.850 (+0.202)	12.350 (+0.471)	14.350 (+0.408)	13.050 (+0.833)	80.400 (+2.427)	164.552
5	Yul Moldauer	13.700	12.350	13.900 (+0.305)	13.750	14.250 (+0.618)	12.900	80.850 (+0.923)	163.896
5	Yul Moldauer	13.000	13.900	14.100 (+0.305)	12.600	14.500 (+0.618)	13.100	81.200 (+0.923)	163.896
6	Cooper Kim	14.450	12.600	12.550	13.850	13.200	14.750 (+0.618)	81.400 (+0.618)	163.736
6	Cooper Kim	13.800	12.900	12.300	13.800	13.250	14.950 (+0.618)	81.100 (+0.618)	163.736
7	Taylor Burkhart	13.500	13.400	13.800	13.850 (+0.217)	14.000	13.100	81.650 (+0.217)	163.736
7	Taylor Burkhart	14.000	13.300	13.850	13.950 (+0.217)	13.800	12.550 (+0.202)	81.450 (+0.419)	163.736
8	David Shamah	13.350	13.700	12.850	12.900	14.350 (+0.408)	13.200	80.450 (+0.408)	161.316
8	David Shamah	14.150	12.300	13.150	12.600	14.550 (+0.408)	13.300	80.050 (+0.408)	161.316
9	Nathan Roman	12.800	12.800	12.850	13.850	14.000 (+0.305)	13.400	79.500 (+0.305)	160.860
9	Nathan Roman	13.250	13.050	13.100	13.450	14.600 (+0.305)	13.300	80.750 (+0.305)	160.860
10	Nicolas Kuebler	13.750	13.250	13.950 (+0.305)	13.550	12.400	12.600	79.500 (+0.305)	158.210
10	Nicolas Kuebler	14.050	12.900	14.200 (+0.305)	13.400	12.450	11.100	78.100 (+0.305)	158.210
11	Hasan Aydogdu	13.300	11.350	14.050 (+0.305)	13.400	13.450	13.300	78.850 (+0.305)	156.910
11	Hasan Aydogdu	13.550	10.600	13.400 (+0.305)	13.350	13.200	13.350	77.450 (+0.305)	156.910
12	Jun Iwai	13.900 (+0.305)	11.250	11.850	14.050	12.900	13.800	77.750 (+0.305)	156.810
12	Jun Iwai	14.350 (+0.305)	10.550	13.050	14.000	13.250	13.250	78.450 (+0.305)	156.810
13	David Ramirez	13.400	13.100	12.750	14.000	13.450	10.300	77.000	156.650
13	David Ramirez	13.450	13.450	13.150	13.200	13.600	12.800	79.650	156.650
14	Elliot Foster	11.600	12.100	12.700	13.750	14.000	13.050	77.200	153.950
14	Elliot Foster	12.900	11.700	12.350	13.150	13.650	13.000	76.750	153.950
15	Fuzzy Benas	12.950	11.500	12.600	12.150	13.600	11.300	74.100	152.650
15	Fuzzy Benas	13.000	12.300	12.650	13.800	14.200	12.600	78.550	152.650
16	Xander Hong	11.350	12.800	12.700	12.650	13.150	12.550	75.200	151.850
16	Xander Hong	13.250	11.900	11.650	13.050	13.700	13.100	76.650	151.850
17	Michael Jaroh	10.500	11.750	13.400	13.450	13.600	13.250	75.950	151.700
17	Michael Jaroh	11.800	11.550	13.550	13.300	12.300	13.250	75.750	151.700
18	Ben Letvin	13.350	11.300	12.200	13.750	12.200	11.850	74.650	150.550
18	Ben Letvin	13.150	11.650	12.650	13.950	12.350	12.150	75.900	150.550
19	Brian Solomon	12.600	12.500	11.900	13.200	13.300	12.300	75.800	149.600
19	Brian Solomon	11.300	11.650	11.800	13.350	13.250	12.450	73.800	149.600
20	Alex Noel	12.750	12.150	12.000	13.550	12.300	10.900	73.650	149.450
20	Alex Noel	12.650	12.300	13.000	12.950	13.550	11.350	75.800	149.450
21	Jesse Hanny	12.100	11.550	12.750	12.950	12.450	12.450	74.250	149.450
21	Jesse Hanny	12.500	11.900	12.700	12.600	12.950	12.550	75.200	149.450
22	Alexandru Nitache	9.000	12.000	11.950	14.500 (+0.471)	13.650	12.500	73.600 (+0.471)	149.344
22	Alexandru Nitache	10.700	12.950 (+0.202)	10.950	13.800 (+0.471)	12.850	13.350	74.600 (+0.673)	149.344
23	Zaiden Kyte	12.200	11.500	12.100	13.800	13.100	12.250	74.950	148.750
23	Zaiden Kyte	13.250	10.750	11.950	13.900	12.050	11.900	73.800	148.750
24	Kellen Ryan	11.300	11.900	11.900	13.350	12.300	13.100	73.850	148.700
24	Kellen Ryan	12.250	11.550	11.900	13.550	13.000	12.600	74.850	148.700
25	Landon Simpson	13.350	12.650	11.900	13.050	13.300	12.550	76.800	146.850
25	Landon Simpson	11.650	10.900	12.050	12.200	13.300	9.950	70.050	146.850
26	Sasha Bogonosiuk	12.200	9.450	12.050	12.350	13.300	11.500	70.850	146.600
26	Sasha Bogonosiuk	12.400	12.100	12.050	13.150	13.850	12.200	75.750	146.600
27	Ty Herzing	11.500	13.150	11.300	12.500	13.450	11.650	73.550	144.700
27	Ty Herzing	12.450	7.800	12.600	12.400	13.150	12.750	71.150	144.700
28	Cash Johnston	12.100	10.950	10.900	12.800	13.350	12.950	73.050	142.600
28	Cash Johnston	13.150	7.900	11.700	12.850	12.250	11.700	69.550	142.600
29	Justin Park	12.750	11.550	12.200	11.750	11.300	9.800	69.350	142.100
29	Justin Park	12.800	10.800	12.900	12.100	11.800	12.350	72.750	142.100
30	Daniel Sanjuanico	11.500	11.500	12.200	12.700	12.200	12.100	72.200	141.400
30	Daniel Sanjuanico	11.700	13.050	10.450	11.650	11.300	11.050	69.200	141.400
31	Yotam Gabay	13.200	11.100	11.550	13.150	10.750	10.150	69.900	140.750
31	Yotam Gabay	12.800	10.150	11.250	13.300	11.750	11.600	70.850	140.750
32	Ori Reilly	10.600	11.200	11.650	11.700	12.400	12.500	70.050	138.350
32	Ori Reilly	11.350	10.250	11.450	12.000	12.350	10.900	68.300	138.350
–	Kameron Nelson	12.350 (+0.513)	–	13.600 (+0.725)	14.350 (+0.471)	13.200	–	53.500 (+1.709)	112.606
–	Kameron Nelson	14.350 (+1.051)	–	14.300 (+0.725)	14.250 (+0.471)	–	12.250	55.150 (+2.247)	112.606
–	Asher Cohen	–	12.050	14.350 (+0.725)	–	13.600	13.000	53.000 (+0.725)	108.050
–	Asher Cohen	–	12.350	14.150 (+0.725)	–	14.350	12.750	53.600 (+0.725)	108.050
–	Crew Bold	12.950	–	–	–	13.500 (+0.202)	13.100 (+0.725)	39.550 (+0.927)	83.604
–	Crew Bold	13.500	–	–	–	14.300 (+0.202)	14.400 (+0.725)	42.200 (+0.927)	83.604
–	Colt Walker	–	–	13.750	13.750	14.150 (+0.618)	–	41.65 (+0.618)	82.876
–	Colt Walker	–	–	13.250	13.650	13.300 (+0.408)	–	40.200 (+0.408)	82.876
–	Garrett Schooley	12.750	–	13.000	14.100 (+0.471)	–	–	39.850 (+0.471)	80.842
–	Garrett Schooley	13.400	–	12.700	13.950 (+0.471)	–	–	40.050 (+0.471)	80.842
–	Patrick Hoopes	–	14.700 (+0.941)	–	–	–	–	14.700 (+0.941)	30.816
–	Patrick Hoopes	–	14.450 (+0.725)	–	–	–	–	14.450 (+0.725)	30.816
–	Brandon Dang	–	14.300 (+0.618)	–	–	–	–	14.300 (+0.618)	30.243
–	Brandon Dang	–	14.600 (+0.725)	–	–	–	–	14.600 (+0.725)	30.243
–	Parker Thackston	–	12.800 (+0.941)	–	–	–	–	12.800 (+0.941)	29.782
–	Parker Thackston	–	15.100 (+0.941)	–	–	–	–	15.100 (+0.941)	29.782
–	Stephen Nedoroscik	–	14.550 (+0.408)	–	–	–	–	14.550 (+0.408)	28.366
–	Stephen Nedoroscik	–	13.000 (+0.408)	–	–	–	–	13.000 (+0.408)	28.366
–	Aaronson Mansberger	–	12.900 (+0.833)	–	–	–	–	12.900 (+0.833)	28.141
–	Aaronson Mansberger	–	14.000 (+0.408)	–	–	–	–	14.000 (+0.408)	28.141

=== Women ===
Rank	Gymnast	Vault (gymnastics)	Uneven bars	Balance beam	Floor (gymnastics)	Day total	Total
1st place, gold medalist(s)	Hezly Rivera	14.200	12.500	14.300	14.000	55.000	111.950
1st place, gold medalist(s)	Hezly Rivera	14.400	13.850	14.400	14.300	56.950	111.950
2nd place, silver medalist(s)	Claire Pease	13.950	14.200	13.900	13.550	55.600	110.800
2nd place, silver medalist(s)	Claire Pease	13.850	14.350	13.800	13.200	55.200	110.800
3rd place, bronze medalist(s)	Charleigh Bullock	14.000	14.250	13.700	13.450	55.400	110.550
3rd place, bronze medalist(s)	Charleigh Bullock	14.200	14.100	13.300	13.550	55.150	110.550
4	Reese Esponda	14.200	13.100	12.350	14.450	54.100	108.900
4	Reese Esponda	14.150	13.300	12.900	14.450	54.800	108.900
5	Jade Carey	14.200	13.350	13.100	13.750	54.400	108.750
5	Jade Carey	14.250	13.400	12.900	13.800	54.350	108.750
6	Dulcy Caylor	13.850	12.900	13.400	13.450	53.600	107.350
6	Dulcy Caylor	13.900	13.200	13.350	13.300	53.750	107.350
7	Skye Blakely	14.200	14.200	13.750	13.450	55.600	107.300
7	Skye Blakely	13.950	14.250	11.600	11.900	51.700	107.300
8	Caroline Moreau	13.900	13.400	12.800	13.050	53.150	107.100
8	Caroline Moreau	14.000	12.250	14.300	13.400	53.950	107.100
8	Izzy Stassi	13.750	13.800	12.900	13.050	53.500	107.100
8	Izzy Stassi	13.600	13.400	13.200	13.400	53.600	107.100
10	Simone Rose	13.800	13.800	13.100	12.700	53.400	107.050
10	Simone Rose	13.600	13.400	13.400	13.250	53.650	107.050
11	Lila Richardson	12.800	13.250	12.850	13.200	52.100	105.800
11	Lila Richardson	13.650	13.100	13.750	13.200	53.700	105.800
12	Tatum Drusch	13.700	13.300	11.700	13.300	52.000	105.000
12	Tatum Drusch	13.700	13.100	12.950	13.250	53.000	105.000
13	Zoey Molomo	14.000	12.950	12.750	13.600	53.300	104.300
13	Zoey Molomo	14.000	11.350	11.900	13.750	51.000	104.300
14	Greta Krob	13.200	12.650	13.200	12.750	51.800	102.950
14	Greta Krob	13.300	13.300	11.800	12.750	51.150	102.950
15	Isabella Anzola	13.150	10.750	12.600	12.950	49.450	102.350
15	Isabella Anzola	13.050	13.250	13.500	13.100	52.900	102.350
16	Ally Damelio	13.550	12.400	10.450	13.200	49.600	101.950
16	Ally Damelio	13.700	12.950	12.700	13.000	52.350	101.950
17	Lavi Crain	13.950	12.200	13.350	12.700	52.200	100.000
17	Lavi Crain	13.200	8.650	13.250	12.700	47.800	100.000
18	Alessia Rosa	13.700	12.700	12.500	11.550	50.450	99.750
18	Alessia Rosa	13.950	11.350	11.250	12.750	49.300	99.750

== Women's national team ==
Pease, Rivera, and Bullock on the all-around podium

At the conclusion of the competition, the following athletes were named to the senior national team: Skye Blakely, Charleigh Bullock, Jade Carey, Dulcy Caylor, Tatum Drusch, Reese Esponda, Zoey Molomo, Caroline Moreau, Claire Pease, Lila Richardson, Hezly Rivera, Simone Rose, and Izzy Stassi.

The following athletes were named to the junior national team: Vivi Crain, Eva Doherty, Sadie Drake, Madelyn Eagle, Avery Haines, Brooklyn Klauser, Anslee McCauley, Amia Pugh-Banks, Paisley Ritger, Kylie Smith, Cassandra Tan, Addalye VanGrinsven, Audrey VanGrinsven, and Sydney Williams.

Additionally Blakely, Bullock, Esponda, Pease and Rivera were selected to compete at the 2026 World Championships with Caylor chosen as the traveling alternate and Carey as the non-traveling alternate.

== Men's national team ==
Wiskus, Richard, and Leykin on the all-around podium

At the conclusion of the competition, the following athletes were named to the senior national team: Crew Bold, Taylor Burkhart, Asher Cohen, Brandon Dang, Asher Hong, Patrick Hoopes, Joshua Karnes, Cooper Kim, Danila Leykin, Yul Moldauer, Kameron Nelson, Frederick Richard, David Shamah, Donnell Whittenburg, and Shane Wiskus. Hasan Aydogdu, Jun Iwai, Alex Noel, David Ramirez, and Nathan Roman were named to senior development team.

Additionally Hoopes, Leykin, Nelson, Richard, and Wiskus were selected to compete at the 2026 World Championships with Moldauer chosen as the traveling alternate and Kim as the non-traveling alternate.

== Participants ==
=== Senior women ===
- Isabella Anzola
- Skye Blakely
- Charleigh Bullock
- Jade Carey
- Dulcy Caylor
- Lavi Crain
- Ally Damelio
- Tatum Drusch
- Reese Esponda
- Addy Fulcher
- Jayla Hang
- Greta Krob
- Zoey Molomo
- Caroline Moreau
- Claire Pease
- Lila Richardson
- Hezly Rivera
- Alessia Rosa
- Simone Rose
- Izzy Stassi

=== Junior women ===
- Gianna Arthur
- Hadley Bird
- Espy Chang
- Vivi Crain
- Aulya Daniels
- Sofie Davtyan
- Eva Doherty
- Sadie Drake
- Madelyn Eagle
- Claire Ekart
- Avery Haines
- Bailynn Kasprzak
- Brooklyn Klauser
- Anslee McCauley
- Annabel Melnyk
- Amariah Moore
- Amia Pugh-Banks
- Paisley Ritger
- Jazzy Saravia
- Kylie Smith
- Cassandra Tan
- Addalye VanGrinsven
- Audrey VanGrinsven
- Sydney Williams

=== Senior men ===
- Hasan Aydogdu
- Fuzzy Benas
- Sasha Bogonosiuk
- Crew Bold
- Nartey Brady
- Taylor Burkhart
- Asher Cohen
- Brandon Dang
- Lincoln Dubin
- Elliot Foster
- Yotam Gabay
- Jesse Hanny
- Ty Herzing
- Kyler Hinson
- Christopher Hiser
- Troy Holman
- Xander Hong
- Patrick Hoopes
- Jun Iwai
- Michael Jaroh
- Cash Johnston
- Joshua Karnes
- Cooper Kim
- Nicolas Kuebler
- Zaiden Kyte
- Charlie Larson
- Ben Letvin
- Danila Leykin
- Aaronson Mansberger
- Yul Moldauer
- Stephen Nedoroscik
- Kameron Nelson
- Preston Ngai
- Alexandru Nitache
- Alex Noel
- Justin Park
- David Ramirez
- Ori Reilly
- Dante Reive
- Frederick Richard
- Nathan Roman
- Anthony Ruscheinsky
- Kellen Ryan
- Daniel Sanjuanico
- Garrett Schooley
- David Shamah
- Owen Shepherd
- Hunter Simpson
- Landon Simpson
- Brian Solomon
- Parker Thackston
- Colt Walker
- Shane Wiskus

=== Junior men ===
- Rocco Aragon
- Andres Aranda
- Thomas Bell
- Finn Boatman
- Peyton Boerner
- Hayden Brown
- Dominick Camarena
- Elijah Connor
- Asher Corbett
- Ilya Danilchenko
- Tenoch Diaz
- Elias Edwards
- Hunter Egan
- Elijah Gutierrez
- Vandan Haake
- Jason Hao
- Jovan Jimeno
- Jakson Kurecki
- Nico Maccario
- Tyler Malecki
- Mason Martin
- Bo McCrea
- Simon McEwen
- Nixon Miles
- Dean Murray
- London Norris
- Joshua Nunez Jr.
- JJ Pacquing
- Simon Pochinka
- Diego Quiroz
- William Rebar
- Hunter Reingold
- Caiden Salado
- Brody Schuller
- Keegan Shemluck
- Abe Stewart
- Brock Strickland
- Jake Wazolek
- Jackson Wilson
