= Fuzzy Benas =

American gymnast

- Benas at the 2026 U.S. National Championships

Personal information
- Full name: Aydon Benas
- Nickname: Fuzzy
- Born: September 25, 2002 (age 23) Albany, New York, U.S.
- Height: 5 ft 6 in (168 cm)

Gymnastics career
- Discipline: Men's artistic gymnastics
- Country represented: United States; (2024–2026)
- College team: Oklahoma Sooners (2022–present)
- Gym: EnRich Gymnastics
- Head coach: Mark Williams
- Assistant coaches: Valeriy Honcharov; Genki Suzuki
Medal record
Men's artistic gymnastics
Representing Oklahoma Sooners
NCAA Championships
Silver medal – second place	2022 Norman	Team
Silver medal – second place	2026 Champaign	Team
Bronze medal – third place	2024 Columbus	Team
Bronze medal – third place	2024 Columbus	All-around
Bronze medal – third place	2025 Ann Arbor	Team
Bronze medal – third place	2025 Ann Arbor	All-around

Aydon "Fuzzy" Benas (born September 25, 2002) is an American artistic gymnast. He is a member of the United States men's national artistic gymnastics team and is currently competing for the Oklahoma Sooners men's gymnastics team in NCAA gymnastics.

== Early life and education ==
Benas was born September 25, 2002, in Albany, New York, to Shannon and Adam Benas. His parents gave him the nickname Fuzzy when they were getting a sonogram and wanted to know the gender – the nurse said the picture was "too fuzzy" to tell, so they started calling him that before he was even born. His hometown is Richmond, Texas and he attended Travis High School. He enrolled at the University of Oklahoma to pursue gymnastics.

== Gymnastics career ==
Benas was the 2018 co-national champion in the 15–16 age division alongside Isaiah Drake and Justin Ah Chow. At the 2019 Winter Cup Benas won gold on rings and placed fourth in the all-around.

In early 2020, Benas competed at the 2020 Winter Cup where he placed first in the all-around and on rings. The remainder of the competitions in 2020 were either canceled or postponed due to the global COVID-19 pandemic. In November of that year Benas signed his National Letter of Intent with the Oklahoma Sooners.

=== 2022–23 ===
Benas became age-eligible for senior-level competition in 2022. He competed at the 2022 Winter Cup where he placed eleventh in the all-around. He competed at the NCAA Championships where he helped Oklahoma finish second as a team. He was named College Gymnastics Association's Rookie of the Year.

After the end of the college season, Benas underwent shoulder surgery and spent the next few months recovering. In October, he severed a nerve in his hand during a pumpkin carving accident. Right after Benas was medically cleared to restart training, he suffered an Achilles tendon rupture. As a result, Benas did not compete during the 2023 NCAA season.

Benas returned to competition in August to compete at the 2023 U.S. Classic and the 2023 U.S. National Championships, although he did not compete on all six apparatuses.

=== 2024–25 ===
Benas made his elite all-around return at the 2024 Winter Cup, where he placed sixth. As a result, he was added to the senior national team for the first time. Additionally Benas was selected to compete at the DTB Pokal Mixed Cup in Stuttgart alongside Riley Loos, Kai Uemura, Addison Fatta, Dulcy Caylor, and Nola Matthews. While there, he helped the USA finish first as a team.

At the 2024 NCAA Men's Gymnastics Championship, Benas helped Oklahoma finish third as a team. Individually he placed third in the all-around behind Khoi Young and Fred Richard. He was named CGA's Gymnast of the Year.

Benas next competed at the 2024 U.S. National Championships where he finished eleventh and was added to the national team. As a result he qualified to compete at the 2024 Olympic Trials where he ultimately finished sixth.

Benas's injuries continued into 2025 as he had surgery on his thumb in January. In August he competed at the 2025 National Championships where he won bronze in the all-around behind Asher Hong and Fred Richard.

== Competitive history ==
Competitive history of Fuzzy Benas at the junior level
Year	Event	Team	AA	FX	PH	SR	VT	PB	HB
2018	U.S. National Championships (15–16)		1st place, gold medalist(s)	1st place, gold medalist(s)	13	1st place, gold medalist(s)	3rd place, bronze medalist(s)	14	3rd place, bronze medalist(s)
2019	RD761 International Junior Team Cup	2nd place, silver medalist(s)	9	8	5		2nd place, silver medalist(s)		3rd place, bronze medalist(s)
2019	Winter Cup		4	5	8	1st place, gold medalist(s)	5	9	13
2019	Elite Team Cup	1st place, gold medalist(s)							
2019	International Junior Team Cup	1st place, gold medalist(s)	7			2nd place, silver medalist(s)	1st place, gold medalist(s)		
2020	Elite Team Cup	1st place, gold medalist(s)							
2020	Winter Cup		3rd place, bronze medalist(s)	2nd place, silver medalist(s)	8	6	6	8	1st place, gold medalist(s)

Competitive history of Fuzzy Benas at the senior level
Year	Event	Team	AA	FX	PH	SR	VT	PB	HB
2022	Winter Cup		11	10	23	12	8	7	7
2022	NCAA Championships	2nd place, silver medalist(s)							
2023	U.S. Classic				25	17		13	10
2023	U.S. National Championships				10	23		17	38
2024	Winter Cup		6	10	15	12		14	10
2024	DTB Pokal Mixed Cup	1st place, gold medalist(s)							
2024	NCAA Championships	3rd place, bronze medalist(s)	3rd place, bronze medalist(s)						
2024	U.S. National Championships		11	10	7	15		14	13
2024	Olympic Trials		6	7	8			11	4
2024	Arthur Gander Memorial		7						
2024	Swiss Cup	9							
2025	Winter Cup			7					
2025	NCAA Championships	3rd place, bronze medalist(s)	3rd place, bronze medalist(s)	8	14	31	11	16	23
2025	U.S. National Championships		3rd place, bronze medalist(s)	8	11	18	3rd place, bronze medalist(s)	5	4
2026	Winter Cup		16	10	31	23		11	23
2026	NCAA Championships	2nd place, silver medalist(s)		20			6	8	12
2026	U.S. National Championships		15	17	24	17		11	25
