= Simone Rose =

American artistic gymnast (born 2008)

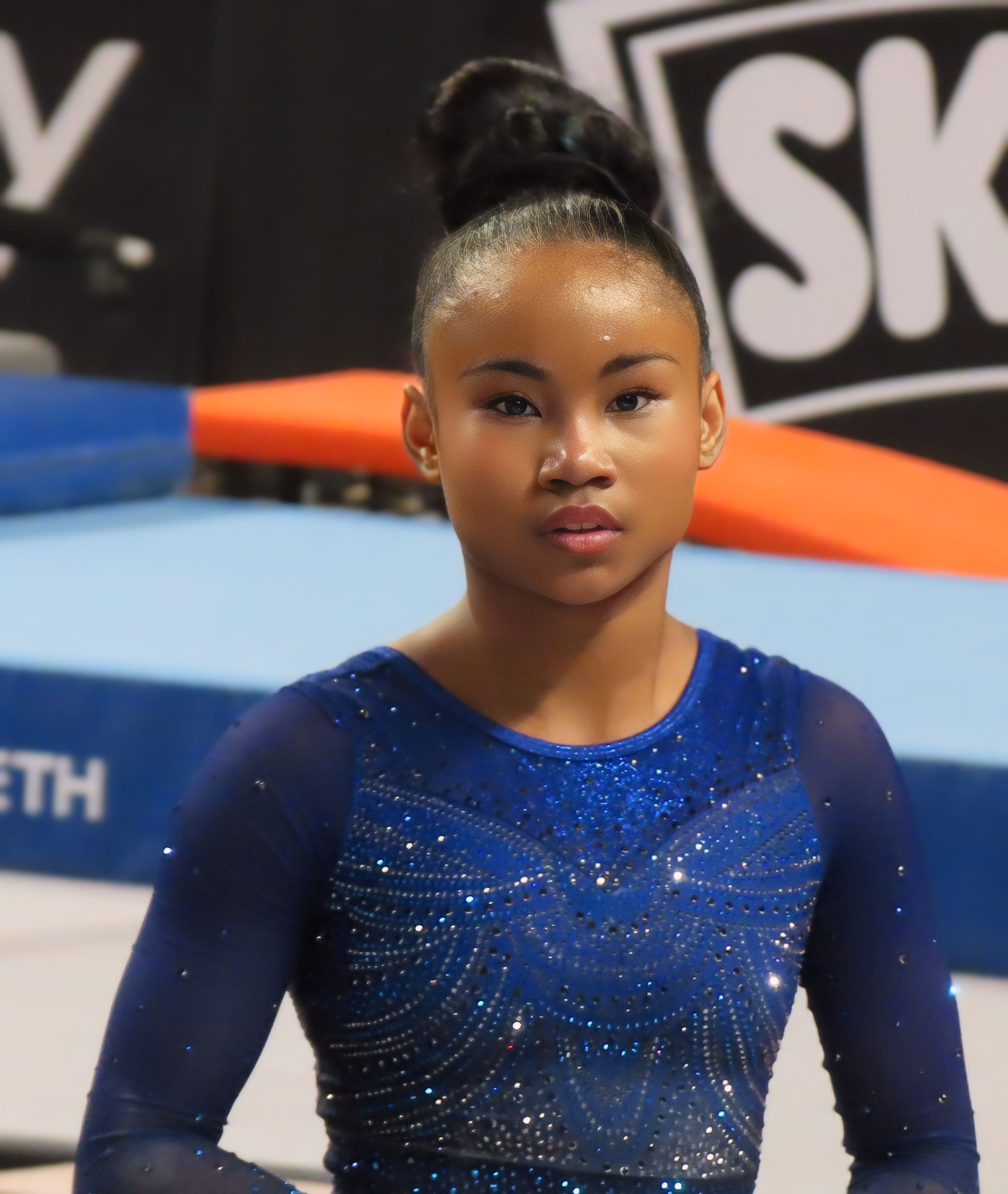
- Rose at the 2024 U.S. Championships

Personal information
- Born: July 9, 2008 (age 18) Bellevue, Washington, U.S.
- Height: 5 ft 0 in (152 cm)

Gymnastics career
- Discipline: Women's artistic gymnastics
- Country represented: United States; (2023–present)
- College team: Florida Gators (2027–2030)
- Gym: Pacific Reign
- Head coach: Cale Robinson
- Assistant coach: Stephanie Gentry
Medal record
Women's artistic gymnastics
Representing United States
Pan American Championships
Gold medal – first place	2026 Rio de Janeiro	Team
Silver medal – second place	2026 Rio de Janeiro	Uneven bars
Silver medal – second place	2026 Rio de Janeiro	Balance beam
Pacific Rim Championships
Gold medal – first place	2024 Cali	Team
Gold medal – first place	2024 Cali	Uneven bars
Gold medal – first place	2024 Cali	Floor exercise

Simone Rose (born July 9, 2008) is an American artistic gymnast. She is a member of the United States national gymnastics team and is the 2024 Pacific Rim team, uneven bars, and floor exercise champion.

== Early life ==
Rose was born in Bellevue, Washington, in 2008 to Jen and Michael Rose. She began gymnastics in 2010. She was raised in Sammamish, Washington.

== Junior gymnastics career ==
Rose competed at the 2022 Winter Cup where she placed fifth in the all-around. In July she competed at the U.S. Classic where she finished third on the uneven bars and balance beam. The following month Rose competed at the National Championships fifteenth and eighth on the uneven bars and balance beam respectively.

Rose competed at the 2023 Winter Cup where she finished seventh in the all-around. She next competed at the 2023 Core Hydration Classic where she finished ninth in the all-around. At the 2023 National Championships Rose finished fifth in the all-around but won bronze on vault. As a result, she was added to the national team for the first time. In November Rose made her international debut at the Combs la Ville International Tournament alongside Ly Bui and Claire Pease. Together they won gold as a team. Individually Rose placed first in the all-around and on floor exercise, second on uneven bars behind Pease, and third on vault behind Ming van Eijken and Pease.

== Senior gymnastics career ==
=== 2024 ===
Rose became age-eligible for senior level competition in 2024. She made her senior debut at the 2024 Winter Cup where she placed fourteenth in the all-around. She was selected to make her senior international debut at the Pacific Rim Championships in April alongside Jayla Hang, Madray Johnson, Kieryn Finnell, and Trinity Thomas (who later withdrew from the competition). At the Pacific Rim Championships Rose helped the USA finish first. Individually she also won gold on uneven bars and floor exercise.

At the 2024 National Championships Rose finished twelfth. In doing so she qualified to compete at the Olympic trials.

=== 2025 ===
Rose competed at the 2025 Winter Cup where she placed third in the all-around behind Ashlee Sullivan and Jayla Hang. Additionally she placed third on the uneven bars. She competed at the DTB Pokal Mixed Cup alongside Sullivan, Nola Matthews, Riley Loos, Kiran Mandava, and Alex Nitache; together they won gold. She next competed at the 2025 City of Jesolo Trophy, where she helped team USA win silver in the team event and individually she won gold on the uneven bars.

On November 12, 2025, she signed with Florida.

=== 2026 ===
Rose competed at the 2026 Winter Cup where she placed third on floor exercise. She was named a member of the US Women's Senior National Team. Rose was also named to the team for the 2026 City of Jesolo Trophy. At that competition, the United States won team gold, and individually, Rose won the bronze medal on balance beam.

Rose competing at the 2026 U.S. National Championships

On May 16, 2026, Rose was selected to represent the United States at the 2026 Pan American Championships. At the competition she helped the USA win gold as a team and individually she qualified to the vault, uneven bars, and balance beam event finals. She placed sixth on vault and won the silver medal on both uneven bars and balance beam behind Aurélie Tran and Isabella Ajalla respectively.

In August, Rose competed at the 2026 U.S. Championships, where she placed tenth in the all-around, fourth on uneven bars, and eighth on balance beam. This performance allowed her to renew her position as a member of the US Women's Senior National Team.

== Competitive history ==
Competitive history of Simone Rose at the junior level
Year	Event	Team	AA	VT	UB	BB	FX
2022	Winter Cup		14	19	18	12	5
2022	U.S. Classic				3rd place, bronze medalist(s)	3rd place, bronze medalist(s)	
2022	U.S. National Championships				15	8	
2023	Winter Cup		7	21	10	8	4
2023	U.S. Classic		9	10	20	7	14
2023	U.S. National Championships		5	3rd place, bronze medalist(s)	9	4	9
2023	Combs la Ville Tournament	1st place, gold medalist(s)	1st place, gold medalist(s)	3rd place, bronze medalist(s)	2nd place, silver medalist(s)	6	1st place, gold medalist(s)

Competitive history of Simone Rose at the senior level
Year	Event	Team	AA	VT	UB	BB	FX
2024	Winter Cup		14		7	18	7
2024	Pacific Rim Championships	1st place, gold medalist(s)			1st place, gold medalist(s)		1st place, gold medalist(s)
2024	U.S. Classic		16		9	34	12
2024	U.S. National Championships		12		12	14	12
2024	Olympic Trials		10		8	12	11
2025	Winter Cup		3rd place, bronze medalist(s)		3rd place, bronze medalist(s)	7	7
2025	DTB Pokal Mixed Cup	1st place, gold medalist(s)					
2025	City of Jesolo Trophy	2nd place, silver medalist(s)	4		1st place, gold medalist(s)		
2025	U.S. Classic		2nd place, silver medalist(s)		2nd place, silver medalist(s)	7	6
2025	U.S. National Championships		5		6	9	6
2026	Winter Cup		6		8	7	3rd place, bronze medalist(s)
2026	City of Jesolo Trophy	1st place, gold medalist(s)	4			3rd place, bronze medalist(s)	5
2026	Pan American Championships	1st place, gold medalist(s)		6	2nd place, silver medalist(s)	2nd place, silver medalist(s)	
2026	U.S. Classic				3rd place, bronze medalist(s)	17	
2026	U.S. National Championships		10		4	8	14
