= Caroline Moreau =

American artistic gymnast (born 2010)

- Moreau at the 2026 U.S. National Championships

Personal information
- Born: February 17, 2010 (age 16) Chicago, Illinois U.S.

Gymnastics career
- Country represented: United States; (2025–present)
- College team: LSU Tigers (2028–31)
- Club: Texas Dreams Gymnastics
- Head coach: Kim Zmeskal
Medal record
Women's artistic gymnastics
Representing the United States
Junior World Championships
Bronze medal – third place	2025 Manila	Team
Bronze medal – third place	2025 Manila	Uneven bars
Bronze medal – third place	2025 Manila	Balance beam

Caroline Moreau (born February 17, 2010) is an American artistic gymnast. She is the 2025 U.S. Junior National Champion and is a three-time Junior World Championships bronze medalist.

== Junior gymnastics career ==
=== 2024 ===
In February she competed at the 2024 Winter Cup where she won bronze on uneven bars and balance beam and placed fifth in the all-around.

In May she competed at the 2024 U.S. Classic, where she won silver on vault and placed sixth in the all-around, seventh on balance beam and eighth on floor exercise.

=== 2025 ===
In February, Moreau competed at the 2025 Winter Cup where she won silver on floor exercise behind Vivi Crain. In April, she competed at the 2025 City of Jesolo Trophy, where she helped team USA win gold in the team event. She also won gold on balance beam and floor exercise, silver in the all-around and bronze on vault.

Moreau (fourth from left) and Team USA at the 2025 Junior World Championships

In July, she competed at the 2025 U.S. Classic, where she won gold on floor exercise, and placed fourth on vault, fifth in the all-around and eighth on uneven bars. She then competed at the 2025 National Championships where she won gold on floor exercise and in the all-around, and silver on vault, uneven bars, and balance beam.

In October, she participated in the selection camp for the 2025 Junior World Championships. She won the all-around with a score of 53.300, and earned an automatic spot on the team. She was joined by Charleigh Bullock, Lavi Crain, and alternate Addy Fulcher. On the first day of the competition, Moreau helped team USA win bronze in the team event and individually she qualified for the all-around, uneven bars, balance beam, and floor exercise event finals. During the all-around final Moreau finished fifth. During event finals, Moreau won bronze on the uneven bars behind Milana Kaiumova and Lucia Piliarová, becoming the first American Junior World medalist on the event. The following day she won bronze on balance beam behind Xiang Yina and Yume Minamino and placed sixth on floor exercise.

== Senior gymnastics career ==
=== 2026 ===
Moreau at the 2026 U.S. National Championships

Moreau made her senior debut at the 2026 Winter Cup, where she placed fourth on balance beam, fifth on floor exercise and in the all-around, and seventh on uneven bars. Following her performance, she was named as a member of the US Women's Senior National Team. She was also selected as a team member for the 2026 City of Jesolo Trophy.

At the 2026 U.S. Classic, Moreau finished eighth in the all-around, in addition to placing sixth on uneven bars and fifth on floor exercise.

In August, she competed at the 2026 U.S. Championships, where she won bronze on balance beam behind Hezly Rivera and Claire Pease. Additionally, she placed eighth in the all-around, tying with Izzy Stassi. Based on her performance, she was renewed as a member of the US Women's Senior National Team.

On November 21, 2026, she committed to compete for the LSU Tigers for the class of 2028.

== Personal life ==
Born in Chicago, Moreau's hometown is Keller, Texas.

== Competitive history ==
Competitive History of Caroline Moreau at the Junior Level
Year	Event	Team	AA	VT	UB	BB	FX
2024	Winter Cup		5		3rd place, bronze medalist(s)	3rd place, bronze medalist(s)	
2024	American Classic		7	3rd place, bronze medalist(s)		6	3rd place, bronze medalist(s)
2024	U.S. Classic		6	2nd place, silver medalist(s)		7	8
2025	Winter Cup		12		14	11	2nd place, silver medalist(s)
2025	City of Jesolo Trophy	1st place, gold medalist(s)	2nd place, silver medalist(s)	3rd place, bronze medalist(s)		1st place, gold medalist(s)	1st place, gold medalist(s)
2025	U.S. Classic		5	4	8	21	1st place, gold medalist(s)
2025	U.S. National Championships		1st place, gold medalist(s)	2nd place, silver medalist(s)	2nd place, silver medalist(s)	2nd place, silver medalist(s)	1st place, gold medalist(s)
2025	Junior World Championships	3rd place, bronze medalist(s)	5	R1	3rd place, bronze medalist(s)	3rd place, bronze medalist(s)	6

Competitive History of Caroline Moreau at the Senior Level
Year	Event	Team	AA	VT	UB	BB	FX
2026	Winter Cup		5		7	4	5
2026	City of Jesolo Trophy	1st place, gold medalist(s)	6		3rd place, bronze medalist(s)	4	
2026	U.S. Classic		8		6	9	5
2026	U.S. National Championships		8		13	3rd place, bronze medalist(s)	9
