= 2024 U.S. Classic =

Gymnastics competition

- Venue: XL Center
- Location: Hartford, Connecticut
- Dates: May 17-18, 2024

The 2024 U.S. Classic, known as the 2024 Core Hydration Classic for sponsorship purposes, was the 40th edition of the U.S. Classic gymnastics competition. The event took place on May 17 and 18, 2024 at the XL Center in Hartford, Connecticut.

At the event, Simone Biles won her seventh career U.S. Classic all-around title.

== Schedule ==
All times are in Eastern Time Zone.

- Hopes Championships – Friday, May 17 at 2:00 PM
- Junior Women – Friday, May 17 at 7:00 PM
- Senior Women Session 1 – Saturday, May 18 at 2:00 PM
- Senior Women Session 2 – Saturday, May 18 at 7:00 PM

== Medalists ==
Event	Gold	Silver	Bronze
Senior
All-around	Simone Biles	Shilese Jones	Jordan Chiles
Vault (Note: Simone Biles only completed one vault with a score of 15.6, leaving her ineligible for a medal.)	Jade Carey	Skye Blakely	Leanne Wong
Uneven bars	Shilese Jones	Simone Biles	Jordan Chiles Trinity Thomas
Balance beam	Sunisa Lee	Simone Biles	Konnor McClain
Floor	Simone Biles	Shilese Jones Kaliya Lincoln	Not awarded
Junior
All-around	Claire Pease	Charleigh Bullock	Maliha Tressel
Vault	Lavi Crain	Caroline Moreau	Alessia Rosa
Uneven bars	Claire Pease	Charleigh Bullock	Maliha Tressel Greta Krob
Balance beam	Claire Pease	Harlow Buddendeck	Maliha Tressel
Floor	Tyler Turner	Claire Pease	Alessia Rosa

== Results ==
=== Seniors ===
Rank	Gymnast	Gym	Vault (gymnastics)	Uneven bars	Balance beam	Floor (gymnastics)	Total
1st place, gold medalist(s)	Simone Biles	World Champions Centre	15.600	14.550	14.550	14.800	59.500
2nd place, silver medalist(s)	Shilese Jones	Ascend	14.350	15.250	14.050	14.000	57.650
3rd place, bronze medalist(s)	Jordan Chiles	World Champions Centre	14.100	14.300	13.700	13.350	55.450
4	Jade Carey	Oregon State University	14.300	12.850	13.450	13.800	54.400
5	Skye Blakely	WOGA	14.050	13.200	13.850	13.250	54.350
6	Tiana Sumanasekera	World Champions Centre	13.850	13.150	13.000	13.900	53.900
7	Leanne Wong	University of Florida	13.950	13.850	12.400	13.250	53.450
8	Dulcy Caylor	World Champions Centre	13.800	13.700	12.750	12.750	53.000
9	Marissa Neal	GAGE	13.400	13.550	13.200	12.800	52.950
10	Kaliya Lincoln	WOGA	13.650	13.100	11.950	14.000	52.700
10	Eveylynn Lowe	GAGE	13.300	12.600	13.550	13.250	52.700
12	Joscelyn Roberson	World Champions Centre	13.550	13.200	13.450	12.300	52.500
12	Kayla DiCello	Hill's Gymnastics	13.650	12.700	13.500	12.650	52.500
14	Nola Matthews	Airborne	12.750	13.550	13.200	12.900	52.400
14	Madray Johnson	WOGA	12.900	13.050	13.550	12.900	52.400
16	Simone Rose	Pacific Reign	13.550	13.550	11.900	13.200	52.200
17	Zoey Molomo	Metroplex	13.050	13.400	12.600	13.100	52.150
18	Lexi Zeiss	Twin City Twisters	12.850	13.500	12.900	12.400	51.650
19	Reese Esponda	World Champions Centre	13.600	12.550	12.050	13.400	51.600
20	Ashlee Sullivan	Metroplex	12.450	12.100	13.450	13.150	51.150
21	Kelise Woolford	Buckeye Gymnastics	12.600	12.350	12.950	13.100	51.000
22	Jayla Hang	Pacific Reign	13.950	10.900	13.900	12.200	50.950
23	Brynn Torry	World Class	13.850	12.750	11.900	12.200	50.700
24	Hezly Rivera	WOGA	13.050	12.550	12.540	12.300	50.350
25	Kieryn Finnell	RGA	11.600	13.250	12.500	12.650	50.000
26	Cambry Haynes	AGA	13.300	12.450	11.100	12.750	49.600
27	Chloe Cho	Gym Olympica	13.050	12.800	11.300	12.200	49.350
27	Jazmyn Jimenez	Gym Olympica	12.950	12.750	11.350	12.300	49.350
29	CaMarah Williams	EDGE Gymnastics	13.750	12.150	10.150	13.000	49.050
30	Brooke Pierson	World Champions Centre	13.250	12.550	10.600	12.050	48.450
30	Malea Milton	GAGE	12.650	12.200	10.950	12.650	48.450
32	Nicole Desmond	World Champions Centre	12.900	9.450	12.800	13.250	48.400
33	Lacie Saltzmann	Texas Dreams Gymnastics	12.150	11.350	13.200	11.550	48.250
34	Annalisa Milton	GAGE	12.750	12.250	10.200	12.700	47.900
35	Audrey Snyder	First State	12.500	11.250	12.750	11.300	47.800
36	Norah Christian	Cascade Elite West	12.100	9.600	11.750	13.150	46.600
–	Sunisa Lee	Midwest Gym	13.150	–	14.600	13.000	40.750
–	Trinity Thomas	University of Florida	13.000	14.300	11.500	–	38.800
–	Ly Bui	GAGE	13.000	13.550	11.950	–	38.500
–	Tatum Drusch	Flips	12.750	13.200	10.050	–	36.000
–	Katelyn Jong	Metroplex	–	14.050	12.200	–	26.250
–	Addison Fatta	Prestige	–	13.650	12.300	–	25.950
–	Sabrina Visconti	Nohas	13.000	–	12.350	–	25.350
–	Jazlene Pickens	Buckeye Gymnastics	12.200	–	–	12.150	24.350
–	Izzy Stassi	Performance	13.300	10.750	–	–	24.050
–	Taylor McMahon	Metroplex	–	11.100	12.800	–	23.900
–	Konnor McClain	Louisiana State University	–	–	14.200	–	14.200
–	Amelia Disidore	GAGE	–	12.200	–	–	12.200
–	Gabby Douglas	WOGA	–	10.100	–	–	10.100

=== Vault ===
In order to be eligible for vault medals at the senior level, two vaults had to be performed. Below are the five gymnasts who performed two vaults.

Position	Gymnast	Vault 1				Vault 2				Total
Position	Gymnast	D Score	E Score	Pen.	Score 1	D Score	E Score	Pen.	Score 2	Total
1st place, gold medalist(s)	Jade Carey	5.6	8.700		14.300	5.0	9.150		14.150	14.225
2nd place, silver medalist(s)	Skye Blakely	5.0	9.050		14.050	4.8	9.000	0.1	13.700	13.875
3rd place, bronze medalist(s)	Leanne Wong	5.0	8.950		13.950	4.2	8.750		12.950	13.450
4	Joscelyn Roberson	5.6	7.950		13.550	5.0	8.300		13.300	13.425
5	Annalisa Milton	4.2	8.550		12.750	4.8	8.400		13.200	12.975

== Participants ==
=== Senior ===
- Simone Biles (World Champions Centre)
- Skye Blakely (WOGA)
- Ly Bui (GAGE)
- Jade Carey (Oregon State University)
- Dulcy Caylor (World Champions Centre)
- Jordan Chiles (World Champions Centre)
- Chloe Cho (Gymnastics Olympica)
- Norah Christian (Cascade Elite West)
- Nicole Desmond (World Champions Centre)
- Kayla DiCello (Hill's Gymnastics)
- Amelia Disidore (GAGE)
- Gabby Douglas (WOGA)
- Tatum Drusch (Flips Gymnastics LLC)
- Reese Esponda (World Champions Centre)
- Addison Fatta (Prestige Gymnastics)
- Kieryn Finnell (RGA)
- Jayla Hang (Pacific Reign Gymnastics)
- Cambry Haynes (Adrenaline Gymnastics)
- Jazmyn Jimenez (Gymnastics Olympica)
- Madray Johnson (WOGA)
- Shilese Jones (Ascend Gymnastics)
- Katelyn Jong (Metroplex)
- Sunisa Lee (Midwest Gymnastics)
- Myli Lew (San Mateo Gymnastics)
- Kaliya Lincoln (WOGA)
- Eveylynn Lowe (GAGE)
- Nola Matthews (Airborne Gymnastics)
- Konnor McClain (Louisiana State University)
- Taylor McMahon (Metroplex)
- Annalisa Milton (GAGE)
- Malea Milton (GAGE)
- Zoey Molomo (Metroplex)
- Marissa Neal (GAGE)
- Jazlene Pickens (Buckeye Gymnastics)
- Brooke Pierson (World Champions Centre)
- Hezly Rivera (WOGA)
- Michelle Pineda (Metroplex)
- Joscelyn Roberson (World Champions Centre)
- Simone Rose (Pacific Reign Gymnastics)
- Lacie Saltzman (Texas Dreams)
- Audrey Snyder (First State Gymnastics)
- Izzy Stassi (Performance Gymnastics)
- Ashlee Sullivan (Metroplex)
- Tiana Sumanasekera (World Champions Centre)
- Trinity Thomas (University of Florida)
- Brynn Torry (World Class Gymnastics)
- Sabrina Visconti (Noha's Gymnastic Academy)
- CaMarah Williams (Edge Gymnastics)
- Leanne Wong (University of Florida)
- Kelise Woolford (Buckeye Gymnastics)
- Lexi Zeiss (Twin City Twisters)
