= Kylie Smith (gymnast) =

American artistic gymnast (born 2011)

- Smith at the 2026 U.S. National Championships

Personal information
- Born: June 18, 2011 (age 15) Loveland, Ohio, U.S.

Gymnastics career
- Country represented: United States; (2024–present)
- Club: Cincinnati Gymnastics
- Head coach: Rachael Gardner
Medal record
Women's artistic gymnastics
Representing the United States
Junior Pan American Games
Gold medal – first place	2025 Asunción	Team

Kylie Smith (born June 18, 2011) is an American artistic gymnast. She is the 2026 Winter Cup junior all-around champion.

== Junior gymnastics career ==
=== 2025 ===
In February, Smith competed at the 2025 Winter Cup where she silver on balance beam and placed fourth in the all-around. In April she competed at the 2025 City of Jesolo Trophy, where she helped team USA win gold in the team event and silver on floor exercise.

In July, she competed at the 2025 U.S. Classic, where she won silver on floor exercise and bronze in the all-around. As a result, she was named to team USA's roster for the 2025 Junior Pan American Games. At the Junior Pan American Games she helped team USA win gold in the team event.

=== 2026 ===
In February, Smith competed at the 2026 Winter Cup where she won gold on uneven bars, floor exercise and in the all-around, and bronze on vault. The next month she competed at the 2026 City of Jesolo Trophy where she helped Team USA win team gold. Individually she won silver in the all-around and on uneven bars and floor exercise.

In July, at the 2026 U.S. Classic, Smith only competed on balance beam and floor exercise, winning silver on the latter. The next month she competed at the 2026 U.S. National Championships, and won silver in the all-around behind Addalye VanGrinsven. Additionally she won bronze on vault and floor exercise. Following the event she was named to the 2026–27 junior national team.

Smith competing at the 2026 U.S. National Championships

== Competitive history ==
Competitive history of Kylie Smith at the junior level
Year	Event	Team	AA	VT	UB	BB	FX
2025	Winter Cup		4		2nd place, silver medalist(s)	5	10
2025	City of Jesolo Trophy	1st place, gold medalist(s)	4				2nd place, silver medalist(s)
2025	U.S. Classic		3rd place, bronze medalist(s)		4	6	2nd place, silver medalist(s)
2025	Junior Pan American Games	1st place, gold medalist(s)	4				
2026	Winter Cup		1st place, gold medalist(s)	3rd place, bronze medalist(s)	1st place, gold medalist(s)	4	1st place, gold medalist(s)
2026	City of Jesolo Trophy	1st place, gold medalist(s)	2nd place, silver medalist(s)		2nd place, silver medalist(s)	4	2nd place, silver medalist(s)
2026	U.S. Classic					6	2nd place, silver medalist(s)
2026	U.S. National Championships		2nd place, silver medalist(s)	3rd place, bronze medalist(s)	6	7	3rd place, bronze medalist(s)
