= Zoey Molomo =

American artistic gymnast

- Molomo at the 2026 U.S. National Gymnastics Championships

Personal information
- Nickname: Zozo
- Born: July 11, 2008 (age 18) Plano, Texas, US

Gymnastics career
- Discipline: Women's artistic gymnastics
- Country represented: United States; (2022–2025)
- College team: UCLA Bruins (2027–2030)
- Club: Metroplex
- Head coach: Marnie Futch

Zoey Molomo (born July 11, 2008) is an American artistic gymnast.

== Junior gymnastics career ==
=== 2022 ===
In February, Molomo competed at the 2022 Winter Cup and won silver on the vault. In April, she competed at 2022 City of Jesolo Trophy alongside Madray Johnson, Myli Lew, Ella Murphy, Gabby Van Frayen, and Tiana Sumanasekera. They won the team event and Molomo won an additional two silver medals on vault and floor exercise.

In July, she was selected to compete at the 2022 Pan American Championships alongside Dulcy Caylor, Tiana Sumanasekera and Alicia Zhou, where she helped the United States win the team gold. In August, she then competed at the 2022 U.S. National Gymnastics Championships where she placed seventh in the all-around and fourth on vault.

=== 2023 ===
Molomo competed at the 2023 Winter Cup where she won bronze on vault and uneven bars, and placed fourth in the all-around. In August, she then competed at the 2023 National Championships where she placed twelfth on uneven bars.

== Senior gymnastics career ==
=== 2024 ===
In February, Molomo made her senior national team debut at the 2024 Winter Cup. During the event she placed ninth on balance beam, seventeenth on uneven bars, twenty-third on floor, and fourteenth in the all-around.

In May, she competed at the 2024 Core Hydration Classic where she placed fourteenth on uneven bars, fifteenth on floor, and seventeenth in the all-around. She then competed at the 2024 National Championships, and placed tenth on balance beam, seventeenth on floor, twentieth on uneven bars, and eleventh in the all-around. As a result, she qualified for the 2024 Olympic Trials. At 15 years old, she was the youngest gymnast at the event. At the Olympic trials, she placed eighth on balance beam, tenth on floor, thirteenth on uneven bars and twelfth in the all-around.

== Competitive history ==
Year	Event	Team	AA	VT	UB	BB	FX
Junior
2022	Winter Cup		13	2nd place, silver medalist(s)	15	21	9
2022	City of Jesolo Trophy	1st place, gold medalist(s)	4	2nd place, silver medalist(s)			2nd place, silver medalist(s)
2022	Pan American Championships	1st place, gold medalist(s)					
2022	U.S. National Championships		7	4			
2023	Winter Cup		4	3rd place, bronze medalist(s)	3rd place, bronze medalist(s)	8	
2023	U.S. National Championships		22		12		
Senior
2024	Winter Cup		14		17	9	23
2024	U.S. Classic		17		14	24	15
2024	U.S. National Championships		11		20	10	17
2024	Olympic Trials		12		13	8	10
2025	Winter Cup		9	1st place, gold medalist(s)	23	3rd place, bronze medalist(s)	7
2026	U.S. Classic		3rd place, bronze medalist(s)		10	4	5
2026	U.S. National Championships		13		15	15	4
