= Lavi Crain =

American artistic gymnast (born 2010)

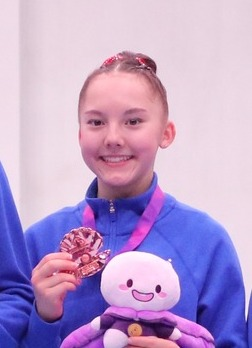
- Crain at the 2025 Junior World Championships

Personal information
- Full name: Lavienna Yeana Crain
- Born: December 9, 2010 (age 15) Coeur D'Alene, Idaho, U.S.

Gymnastics career
- Discipline: Women's artistic gymnastics
- Country represented: United States; (2024–2025)
- Training location: Spring, Texas
- Club: World Champions Centre; GAGE (former)
- Head coaches: Patrick Kiens; Daymon Jones
- Former coaches: Al Fong; Armine Barutyan-Fong
Medal record
Women's artistic gymnastics
Representing the United States
Junior World Championships
Gold medal – first place	2025 Manila	Vault
Bronze medal – third place	2025 Manila	Team
Junior Pan American Games
Gold medal – first place	2025 Asunción	Team

Lavienna "Lavi" Yeana Crain (born December 9, 2010) is an American artistic gymnast. She is the 2025 Junior World Champion on vault.

== Junior gymnastics career ==
=== 2023 ===
In August, Crain competed at the 2023 U.S. Classic where she finished sixth on vault and eighth on balance beam. She was then named to the roster for the 2023 National Championships, where she finished sixth on vault.

=== 2024 ===
In February, she competed at the 2024 Winter Cup where she won silver in the all-around, bronze on floor exercise, and placed fourth on uneven bars and balance beam. The next month she competed at the International Gymnix where she won gold in the team event and vault, silver in the all-around, and floor exercise, and placed sixth on balance beam and seventh on uneven bars.

In April, she competed at the 2024 City of Jesolo Trophy, where she helped team USA win gold in the team event and silver on vault.

In May, she competed at the 2024 U.S. Classic, where she won gold on vault and placed fourth on balance beam. She then competed at the 2024 National Championships, where she won gold on vault, and placed fifth in the all-around, sixth on balance beam and seventh on floor exercise.

=== 2025 ===
In February, she competed at the 2025 Winter Cup where she won gold on vault, balance beam and in the all-around, and placed eighth on floor exercise. In April, she competed at the 2025 City of Jesolo Trophy, where she helped team USA win gold in the team event, all-around, and vault, and won bronze on balance beam.

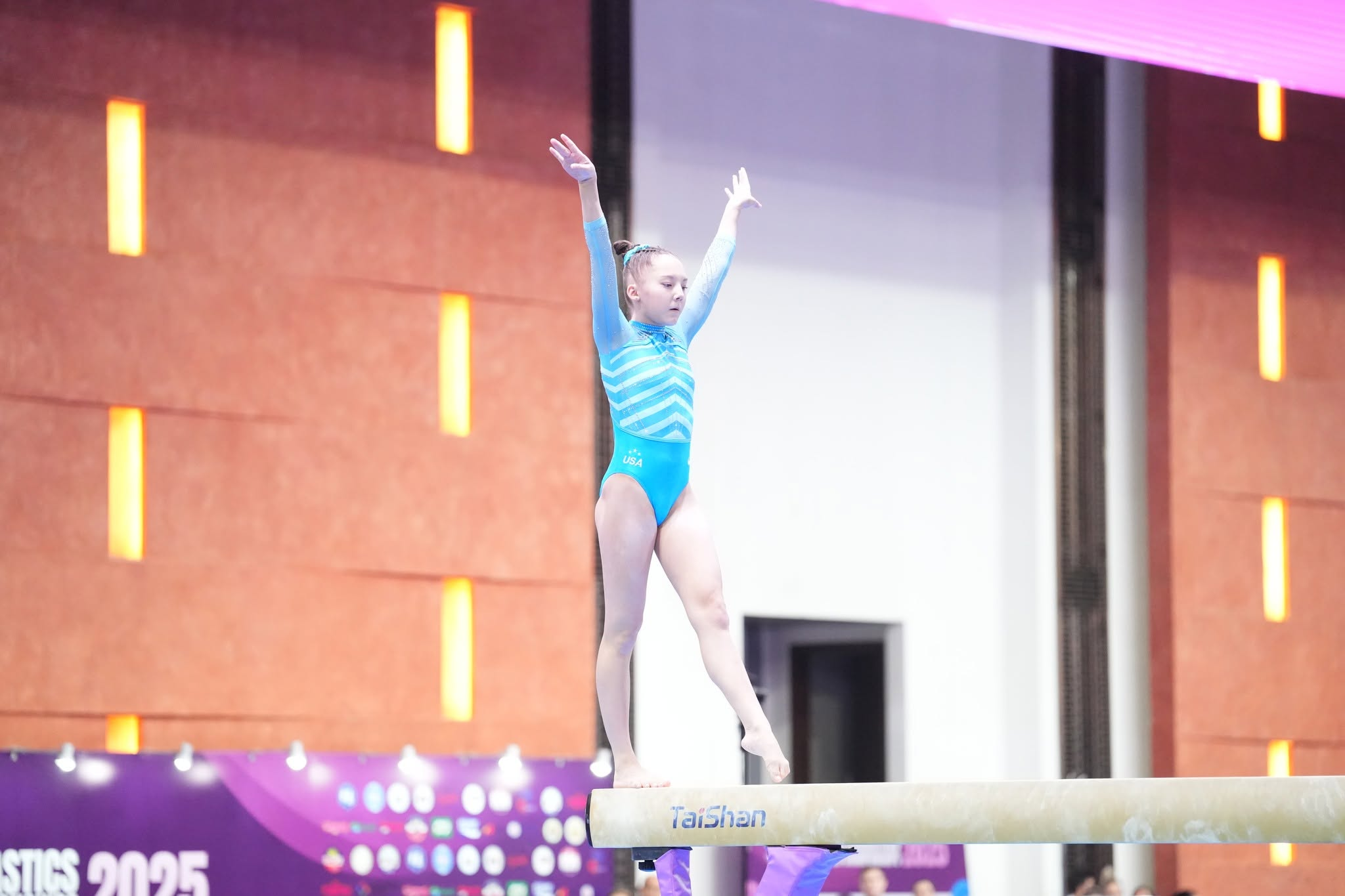
Crain competing at the 2025 Junior World Championships

In July, she competed at the 2025 U.S. Classic, where she won gold on vault, balance beam, and in the all-around, and silver on uneven bars. As a result, she was named to team USA's roster for the 2025 Junior Pan American Games. At the Junior Pan American Games she helped team USA win gold in the team event. She advanced to the vault final in second with a score of 13.425. During the event finals she finished in seventh place with a score of 12.333.

On October 15, 2025, she was selected to represent the United States at the 2025 Junior World Championships, alongside Charleigh Bullock and Caroline Moreau. She helped team USA win bronze in the team event and qualified for the all-around, vault, and uneven bars event finals. During the all-around final Crain finished fourth, tying Kayla DiCello and Jayla Hang's highest all-around placement of an American athlete at the Junior World Championships. During event finals Crain won gold on vault, becoming the second American to win a title at the Junior World Championships after DiCello won gold on the same apparatus in 2019. She finished eighth on uneven bars.

== Senior gymnastics career ==
=== 2026 ===
Crain competing at the 2026 National Championships

In February 2026, Crain's gym, Great American Gymnastics Express, had their membership terminated by USA Gymnastics over allegations of abuse and non-compliance with safety codes and suspensions. The following month Crain announced that she would be training at World Champions Centre in Spring, Texas.

In August, Crain competed at her first senior level National Championships. After the first day of competition, Crain was sitting in twelfth place in the all-around. On the second day of competition, on her final apparatus, the uneven bars, Crain smacked into the lower bar which led to her taking a hard fall and requiring medical assistance; she did not finish her routine. She posted on her Instagram that she was medically cleared after the fall and suffered no injuries.

== Personal life ==
Crain's younger sister, Vivi, is also a gymnast. Their mother, Chloe, is originally from Seoul, South Korea, while their father, Rob, is American.

== Competitive history ==
Competitive history of Lavi Crain
Year	Event	Team	AA	VT	UB	BB	FX
2023	Nastia Liukin Cup		7	2nd place, silver medalist(s)			3rd place, bronze medalist(s)
2023	U.S. Classic		11	6		8	
2023	U.S. National Championships			6			
2024	Winter Cup		2nd place, silver medalist(s)	4	4	3rd place, bronze medalist(s)	
2024	International Gymnix	1st place, gold medalist(s)	2nd place, silver medalist(s)	1st place, gold medalist(s)	7	6	2nd place, silver medalist(s)
2024	City of Jesolo Trophy	1st place, gold medalist(s)	9	3rd place, bronze medalist(s)			
2024	U.S. Classic			1st place, gold medalist(s)		4	
2024	U.S. National Championships		5	1st place, gold medalist(s)		6	7
2025	Winter Cup		1st place, gold medalist(s)	1st place, gold medalist(s)		1st place, gold medalist(s)	8
2025	City of Jesolo Trophy	1st place, gold medalist(s)	1st place, gold medalist(s)	1st place, gold medalist(s)		3rd place, bronze medalist(s)	
2025	American Classic		1st place, gold medalist(s)		6	1st place, gold medalist(s)	
2025	U.S. Classic		1st place, gold medalist(s)	1st place, gold medalist(s)	2nd place, silver medalist(s)	1st place, gold medalist(s)	13
2025	Junior Pan American Games	1st place, gold medalist(s)		7			
2025	Junior World Championships	3rd place, bronze medalist(s)	4	1st place, gold medalist(s)	8		
2026	U.S. National Championships		17		18	6	16
