= Ashlee Sullivan =

American artistic gymnast

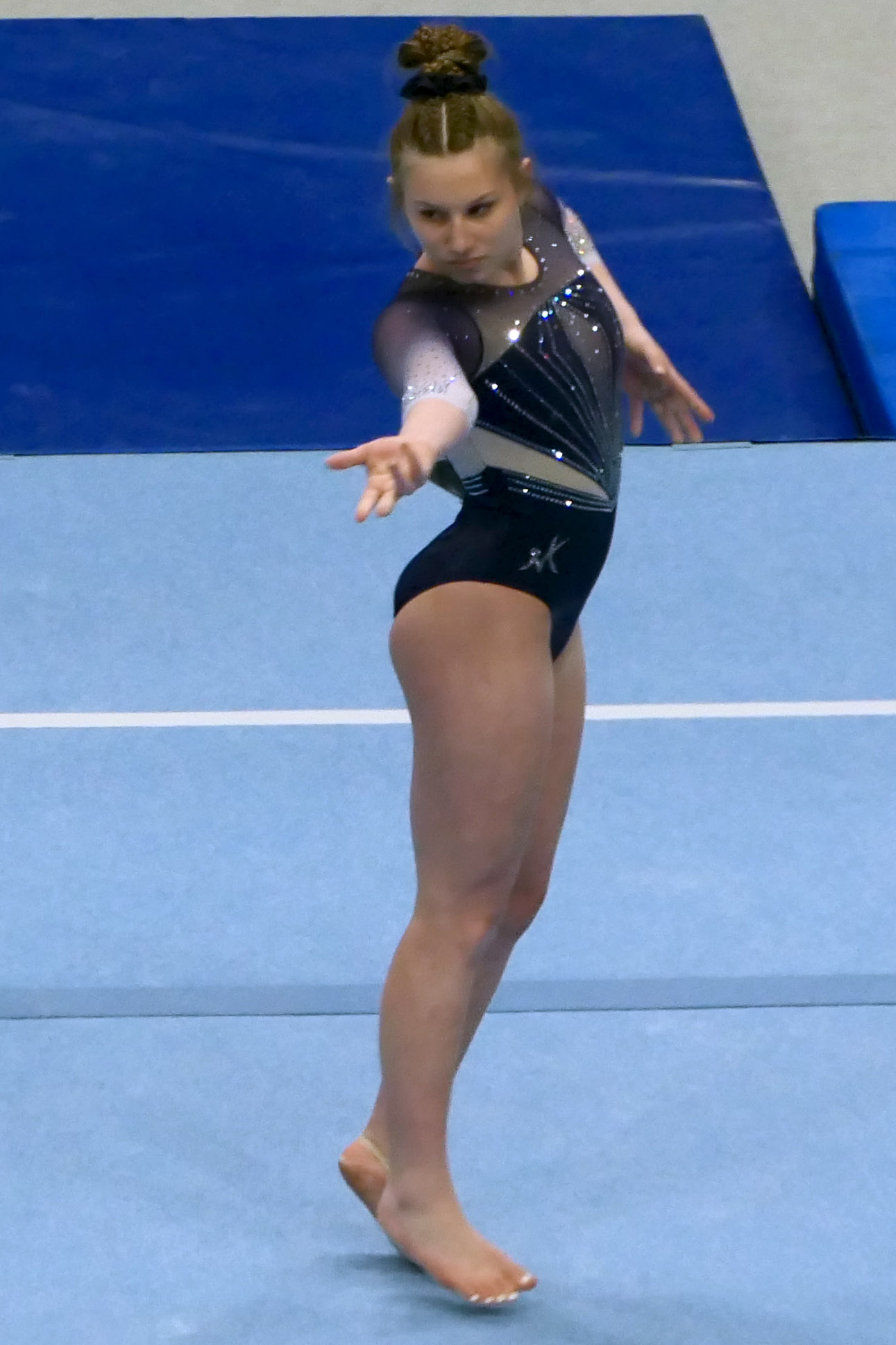
- Sullivan at the 2024 U.S. Classic

Personal information
- Born: December 20, 2006 (age 19) Austell, Georgia, U.S.

Gymnastics career
- Discipline: Women's artistic gymnastics
- Country represented: United States; (2022–2026)
- College team: UCLA Bruins (2026–2029)
- Club: Metroplex Gymnastics
- Head coach: Marnie Futch
- Former coach: Valeri Liukin

Ashlee Sullivan (born December 20, 2006) is an American artistic gymnast. She is the 2025 Winter Cup all-around champion.

== Junior gymnastics career ==
In February 2021, Sullivan competed at the 2021 Winter Cup, where she won silver on vault and placed tenth in the all-around.

== Senior gymnastics career ==
=== 2022 ===
Sullivan made her senior debut at the 2022 Winter Cup, where she won bronze on balance beam. As a result she was selected to compete at the DTB Pokal Team Challenge in Stuttgart alongside Skye Blakely, Emjae Frazier, Nola Matthews, and Konnor McClain. At the DTB Pokal Team Challenge she helped team USA win gold. She then competed at the 2022 City of Jesolo Trophy and helped team USA win gold.

=== 2023 ===
In February, she competed at 2023 Winter Cup, where she won silver in the all-around and bronze on balance beam and floor exercise. She then competed at the DTB Pokal Team Challenge alongside Matthews, Zoe Miller, Joscelyn Roberson, and Lexi Zeiss and they won the team gold medal.

=== 2024 ===
In May, she competed at the 2024 Core Hydration Classic where she placed eleventh on uneven bars, thirteenth on floor, and twentieth in the all-around. She then competed at the 2024 National Championships, and placed fourteenth on balance beam, sixteenth on floor, and twenty-first in the all-around.

On November 13, 2024, Sullivan signed her national letter of intent (NLI) to compete at Michigan.

=== 2025 ===
In February, she competed at the 2025 Winter Cup where she won gold in the all-around, silver on floor, bronze on balance beam and placed fourth on uneven bars and fifth on vault. In April she competed at the 2025 City of Jesolo Trophy, where she helped team USA win silver in the team event, and bronze in the all-around, vault and balance beam. On May 10, 2025, Sullivan switched her collegiate commitment to UCLA.

At the 2025 National Championships Sullivan finished fourth in the all-around and third on floor exercise behind Hezly Rivera and Joscelyn Roberson. As a result she was added to the national team and invited to partake in the World Championships selection camp. At the conclusion of the selection camp Sullivan was named as a non-traveling alternate for the 2025 World Championships.

In November, she competed at the Memorial Arthur Gander tournament where she placed first overall, 3 points ahead of second place. She was also the top finisher on both floor and bars and second on vault.

== NCAA gymnastics career ==
=== Regular season rankings ===
Season	All-Around	Vault	Uneven Bars	Balance Beam	Floor Exercise
2026	N/A	40	47	N/A	18

== Competitive history ==
Competitive history of Ashlee Sullivan at senior level
Year	Event	Team	AA	VT	UB	BB	FX
2020	WOGA Classic		4	2nd place, silver medalist(s)			3rd place, bronze medalist(s)
2020	International Gymnix		9			6	
2021	Winter Cup		10	2nd place, silver medalist(s)	6		10
2022	Winter Cup		10	2nd place, silver medalist(s)	6		10
2022	DTB Pokal Team Challenge	1st place, gold medalist(s)					
2022	City of Jesolo Trophy	1st place, gold medalist(s)					
2023	Winter Cup		2nd place, silver medalist(s)			3rd place, bronze medalist(s)	3rd place, bronze medalist(s)
2023	DTB Pokal Team Challenge	1st place, gold medalist(s)					
2024	U.S. Classic		20		37	11	13
2024	U.S. National Championships		21		29	14	16
2025	Winter Cup		1st place, gold medalist(s)	5	4	3rd place, bronze medalist(s)	2nd place, silver medalist(s)
2025	DTB Pokal Mixed Cup	1st place, gold medalist(s)					
2025	City of Jesolo Trophy	2nd place, silver medalist(s)	3rd place, bronze medalist(s)	3rd place, bronze medalist(s)		4	
2025	U.S. Classic		6		22	1st place, gold medalist(s)	15
2025	U.S. National Championships		4		14	8	3rd place, bronze medalist(s)
2025	Arthur Gander Memorial		1st place, gold medalist(s)				

Competitive history of Ashlee Sullivan at NCAA Level
Year	Event	Team	AA	VT	UB	BB	FX
2026	Big Ten Championships	1st place, gold medalist(s)					2nd place, silver medalist(s)
2026	NCAA Championships	5		41	16		4
