= Charleigh Bullock =

American artistic gymnast (born 2010)

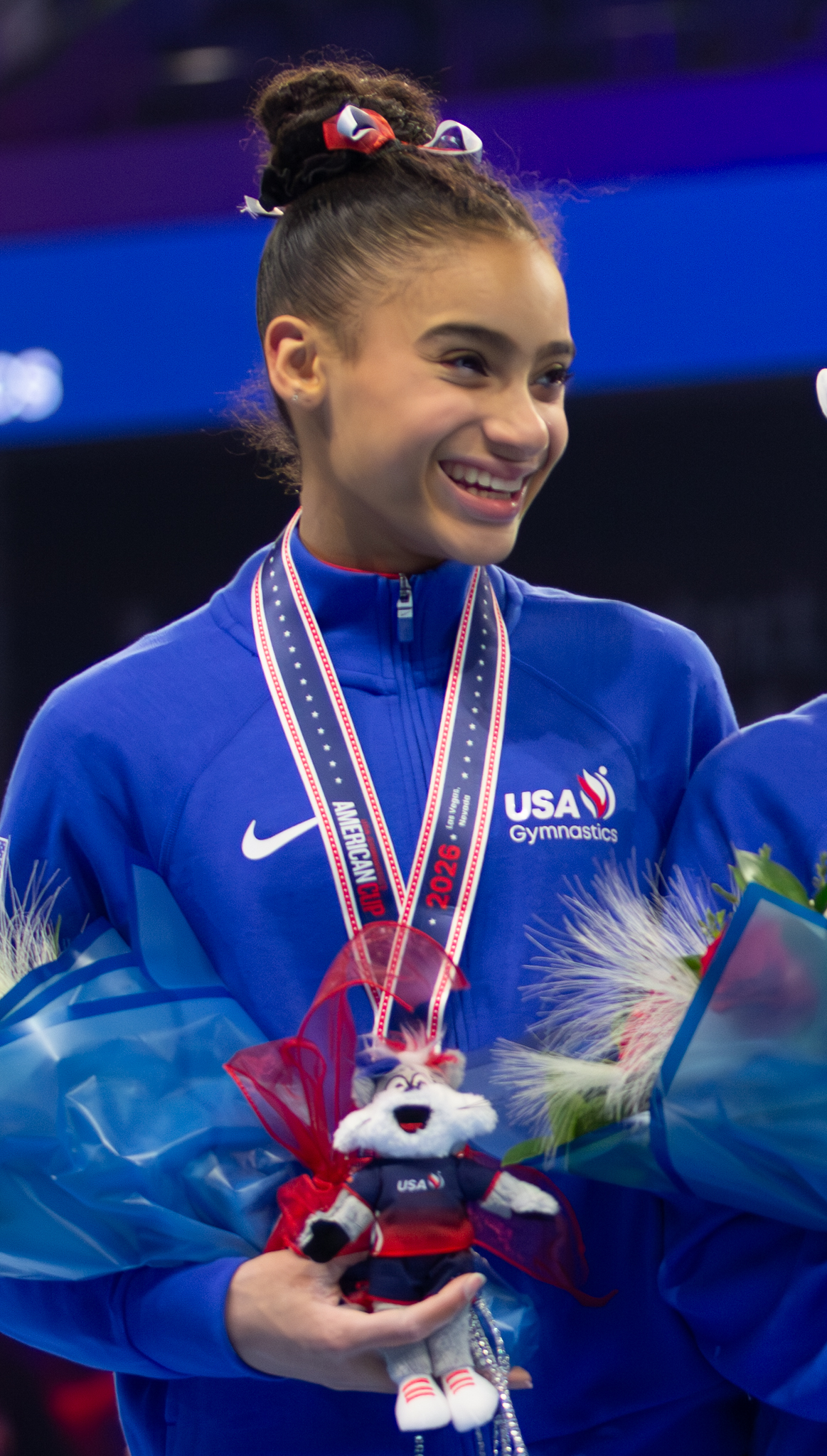
- Bullock at the 2026 American Cup

Personal information
- Full name: Charleigh Bernice Bullock
- Nickname: Char
- Born: July 2, 2010 (age 16) Fredericksburg, Virginia, U.S.

Gymnastics career
- Discipline: Women's artistic gymnastics
- Country represented: United States; (2025–present)
- Club: Capital Gymnastics
- Head coach: Tatiana Perskaia
Medal record
Women's artistic gymnastics
Representing the United States
World Championships
Silver medal – second place	2026 Rotterdam	Team
Pan American Championships
Gold medal – first place	2026 Rio de Janeiro	Team
Silver medal – second place	2026 Rio de Janeiro	All-around
Junior World Championships
Bronze medal – third place	2025 Manila	Team

Charleigh Bernice Bullock (born July 2, 2010) is an American artistic gymnast. She was a member of the silver medal-winning team at the 2026 World Championships. Bullock also won team bronze with the United States at the 2025 Junior World Championships.

== Junior gymnastics career ==
=== 2024 ===
In February, she competed at the 2024 Winter Cup where she placed fifth on uneven bars, eighth on balance beam and ninth in the all-around. In May, she competed at the 2024 U.S. Classic, where she won silver in the all-around, placed fourth on balance beam and seventh on floor exercise. She then competed at the 2024 National Championships, where she placed twelfth on uneven bars and balance beam and thirteenth on floor exercise.

=== 2025 ===
In February, she competed at the 2025 Winter Cup where she won gold on uneven bars and placed sixth in the all-around. The next month she competed at the International Gymnix and helped team USA win silver in the team event, and all-around. In April, she competed at the 2025 City of Jesolo Trophy, where she helped team USA win gold in the team event, and won silver on uneven bars.

In July, she competed at the 2025 American Classic and won gold on uneven bars and silver in the all-around. Weeks later, she competed at the 2025 U.S. Classic, where she won gold on uneven bars, and silver in the all-around. As a result, she was named to team USA's roster for the 2025 Junior Pan American Games.

In August, she competed at the 2025 National Championships where she won gold on uneven bars. She then competed at the Junior Pan American Games, and helped team USA win gold in the team event. Individually she won gold in the all-around with a score of 51.450 and earned an automatic spot at the 2027 Pan American Games. She advanced to three of four apparatus finals. On the first day of event finals she won gold on uneven bars with a score of 14.000. On the final day of event finals she won gold on balance beam with a score of 12.533 and gold on floor exercise with a score of 12.500. She led all Americans at the event with five gold medals.

On October 15, 2025, she was selected to represent the United States at the 2025 Junior World Championships, alongside Lavi Crain and Caroline Moreau. She helped team USA win bronze in the team event and qualified for the balance beam event final. During the event final she finished sixth.

== Senior gymnastics career ==
=== 2026 ===
Bullock made her senior debut at the 2026 Winter Cup, where she finished second in the all-around behind Hezly Rivera. She also won gold on uneven bars, bronze on balance beam, and placed fourth on floor exercise. Following her performance, she was named a member of the 2026 US Women's Senior National Team. She was also selected to represent the United States at the 2026 American Cup, alongside Rivera and Claire Pease. Additionally, she was named to the team for the 2026 City of Jesolo Trophy.

At the 2026 American Cup, Bullock, Rivera, and Pease competed for the USA alongside Asher Hong, Yul Moldauer, and Danila Leykin. She performed routines on uneven bars and balance beam, contributing to the United States' silver-medal finish.

On May 16, 2026, she was selected to represent the United States at the 2026 Pan American Championships. At the competition she helped the USA win gold as a team and individually she qualified for the all-around, balance beam, and floor exercise event finals. She won silver in the all-around behind teammate Pease, receiving the highest uneven bars score of the final. She also finished sixth in the balance beam and floor exercise finals.

In August 2026, she competed at the 2026 U.S. Championships where she won bronze in the all-around and on uneven bars.

In September she participated in the USA Gymnastics team selection camp for the 2026 World Championships. During the selection camp, she had the third-highest all-around score of 55.650, and had a combined total of 77.610 based on her scores at the event and at the National Championships the previous month. She was subsequently named to the team on the first day of competition, having earned an automatic berth alongside Pease. She was joined by Skye Blakely, Reese Esponda, Rivera, and alternate Dulcy Caylor who was eventually swapped in for Rivera. At the World Championships, Bullock helped the United States qualify to the team final and individually she scored high enough to qualify to the all-around final but did not due to two teammates (Pease and Blakely) scoring higher. During the team final she contributed scores on vault and uneven bars towards the United States's second place finish.

== Personal life ==
Bullock was born to Chad and Lorraine Bullock, and has three siblings, Chloe, Cody, and Chandler.

== Competitive history ==
Competitive history of Charleigh Bullock at the junior level
Year	Event	Team	AA	VT	UB	BB	FX
2024	Winter Cup		9		5	8	
2024	American Classic		4		3		5
2024	U.S. Classic		2nd place, silver medalist(s)			4	7
2024	U.S. National Championships		13		12	12	13
2025	Winter Cup		6		1st place, gold medalist(s)		
2025	City of Jesolo Trophy	1st place, gold medalist(s)			2nd place, silver medalist(s)		
2025	International Gymnix	2nd place, silver medalist(s)	2nd place, silver medalist(s)		3rd place, bronze medalist(s)	6	
2025	American Classic		2nd place, silver medalist(s)		1st place, gold medalist(s)		
2025	U.S. Classic		2nd place, silver medalist(s)		1st place, gold medalist(s)		8
2025	U.S. National Championships				1st place, gold medalist(s)		
2025	Junior Pan American Games	1st place, gold medalist(s)	1st place, gold medalist(s)		1st place, gold medalist(s)	1st place, gold medalist(s)	1st place, gold medalist(s)
2025	Junior World Championships	3rd place, bronze medalist(s)				6	

Competitive history of Charleigh Bullock at the senior level
Year	Event	Team	AA	VT	UB	BB	FX
2026	Winter Cup		2nd place, silver medalist(s)		1st place, gold medalist(s)	3rd place, bronze medalist(s)	4
2026	American Cup	2nd place, silver medalist(s)					
2026	City of Jesolo Trophy	1st place, gold medalist(s)	2nd place, silver medalist(s)		2nd place, silver medalist(s)		
2026	Pan American Championships	1st place, gold medalist(s)	2nd place, silver medalist(s)			6	6
2026	U.S. National Championships		3rd place, bronze medalist(s)		3rd place, bronze medalist(s)	4	5
2026	World Championships	2nd place, silver medalist(s)					
