= 2025 Winter Cup =

Artistic gymnastics competition in the USA

- Venue: Freedom Hall
- Location: Louisville, Kentucky, U.S.
- Dates: February 21–23, 2025

The 2025 Winter Cup was an artistic gymnastics competition held at Freedom Hall in Louisville, Kentucky, on February 21–23, 2025. As in recent years, the competition included men's and women's gymnastics.

== Background ==
The event was held in Louisville, which hosted the 2023 and 2024 Winter Cup.

== Competition schedule ==
The competition had senior and junior competitions for both women's and men's disciplines. The competition schedule was (all times in eastern).

Friday, February 21:

- Winter Cup – Senior Men – Day 1, 6:00 p.m.

Saturday, February 22:

- Elite Team Cup – 1:00 p.m.
- Winter Cup – Senior Women – 6:00 p.m.

Sunday, February 23:

- Winter Cup – Junior Women – 9:00 a.m.
- Nastia Liukin Cup – 12:30 p.m.
- Winter Cup – Junior Men and Senior Men Day 2 – 4:30 p.m.

== Medalists ==
Event	Gold	Silver	Bronze
Senior Women
Individual all-around	Ashlee Sullivan	Jayla Hang	Simone Rose
Vault	Zoey Molomo	Jayla Hang	Eveylynn Lowe
Uneven bars	Alicia Zhou	Brooke Pierson	Simone Rose
Balance beam	Tatum Drusch Claire Pease	Not awarded	Ashlee Sullivan Zoey Molomo
Floor	Nola Matthews	Ashlee Sullivan Jayla Hang Eveylynn Lowe	Not awarded
Junior Women
Individual all-around	Lavi Crain	Vivi Crain	Addalye VanGrinsven
Vault	Lavi Crain	Sydney Williams	Not awarded
Uneven bars	Charleigh Bullock	Kylie Smith	Sydney Williams
Balance beam	Lavi Crain	Vivi Crain	Trinity Wood
Floor	Vivi Crain	Caroline Moreau	Addalye VanGrinsven
Senior Men
Individual all-around	Riley Loos	Fred Richard	Taylor Christopulos
Floor	Riley Loos	Jun Iwai	Jesse-Lee Pakele
Pommel horse	Brandon Dang	Patrick Hoopes	Ignacio Yockers
Rings	Riley Loos	Alex Diab	Matthew Underhill
Vault	Nartey Brady	Kameron Nelson	Brandon Nguyen
Parallel bars	Colt Walker	Brandon Nguyen	Fred Richard
Horizontal bar	Crew Bold	Drake Andrews	Fred Richard
Junior Men
Individual all-around	Adam Lakomy	Alex Noel	Eli Osuna
Floor	Adam Lakomy	Finn Grenstam	Eli Osuna
Pommel horse	Maksim Kan	Michael Scheiner	Daniel San Juanico
Rings	Nathan Underhill	Bobby Haberstock	Joshua Hanny
Vault	Nathan Underhill	Shaun Smith	Joseph Hale
Parallel bars	Joey Nieves	Tristen Nye	Joseph Hale
Horizontal bar	Adam Lakomy	Joey Nieves	Maksim Kan

== National team and international assignments ==
Due to winning a team medal at the 2024 Olympic Games, all five team members plus the two traveling alternates were automatically named to the men's national team: Asher Hong, Paul Juda, Brody Malone, Stephen Nedoroscik, Fred Richard, Shane Wiskus, and Khoi Young.

Following the conclusion of the competition, the following individuals were also named to the national team: Taylor Burkhart, Taylor Christopulos, Brandon Dang, Alex Diab, Patrick Hoopes, Jun Iwai, Riley Loos, Alex Nitache, and Colt Walker. Additionally Tate Costa, Josh Karnes, Kiran Mandava, Kai Uemura retained their spots on the senior development team.

Additionally USA Gymnastics also announced upcoming international assignments. Multiple gymnasts were given FIG World Cup assignments: Baku – Dang, Hoopes, and Diab; Antalya – Dang, Hoopes, and Hong alongside women's team members Claire Pease and Jayla Hang; Osijek – Diab, Loos, and Iwai; Cairo – Dang, Diab, and Hoopes. For the DTB Pokal Team Challenge and Mixed Cup Loos, Iwai, Christopulos, Walker, and Uemura were selected for the Team Challenge while Mandava and Nitache were selected for the Mixed Cup, to be joined by Ashlee Sullivan, Simone Rose, and Nola Matthews.

== Participants ==
=== Men ===
- Javier Alfonso
- Drake Andrews
- Hasan Aydogdu
- Fuzzy Benas
- ~~Jeremy Bischoff~~
- Sasha Bogonosiuk
- Crew Bold
- Nartey Brady
- Taylor Burkhart
- Kelton Christiansen
- Taylor Christopulos
- Caden Clinton
- Ethan Cox
- Brandon Dang
- Alex Diab
- Brigham Frentheway
- Kristian Grahovski
- Tas Hajdu
- Dallas Hale
- Patrick Hoopes
- Jun Iwai
- Kyle Jordan
- ~~Panteley Kolodii~~
- Danila Leykin
- Riley Loos
- Kiran Mandava
- Kameron Nelson
- Preston Ngai
- Brandon Nguyen
- Alexandru Nitache
- Jesse-Lee Pakele
- Justin Park
- Zachary Patrick
- David Ramirez
- Divier Ramos
- Dante Reive
- Fred Richard
- Ty Roderiques
- Nathan Roman
- Ian Sandoval
- Caden Spencer
- Parker Thackston
- Kai Uemura
- Matthew Underhill
- Erich Upton
- Colt Walker
- Ignacio Yonkers

=== Women ===
- Harlow Buddendeck
- Dulcy Caylor
- Tatum Drusch
- Jordis Eichman
- Kieryn Finnell
- Catherine Guy
- Jayla Hang
- Gabrielle Hardie
- Myli Lew
- Evey Lowe
- Nola Matthews
- Annalisa Milton
- Malea Milton
- Avery Moll
- Zoey Molomo
- Claire Pease
- Jazlene Pickens
- Brooke Pierson
- Hezly Rivera
- Alessia Rosa
- Simone Rose
- Izzy Stassi
- Ashlee Sullivan
- ~~Tiana Sumanasekera~~
- Brynn Torry
- Maliha Tressel
- Audree Valdenarro
- Camie Westerman
- CaMarah Williams
- Halle Shea Wittenberg
- Kelise Woolford

== Nastia Liukin Cup ==
2025 Nastia Liukin Cup
- Venue: Freedom Hall
- Location: Louisville, Kentucky, U.S.
- Dates: February 23, 2025

Medalists
gold medal	Mackenzie Estep (Senior); Elizaveta Grebenkova (Junior); Caylee Cain (Junior)
silver medal	Jasmine Cawley (Senior)
bronze medal	Cameron Tassone (Senior)

The 16th annual Nastia Liukin Cup was held in conjunction with the 2025 Winter Cup.

=== Medal winners ===
Event	Gold	Silver	Bronze
Senior
All-around	Mackenzie Estep	Jasmine Cawley	Cameron Tassone
Junior
All-around	Elizaveta Grebenkova Caylee Cain	Not awarded	Galilee Vestnys Kennedy Abercrombie
