= 2023 Winter Cup =

Artistic gymnastics competition in the USA

- Venue: Freedom Hall
- Location: Louisville, Kentucky, U.S.
- Dates: February 24–26, 2023

The 2023 Winter Cup is an artistic gymnastics competition that was held at Freedom Hall in Louisville, Kentucky on February 24–26, 2023. Like in recent years, this competition included both men's and women's gymnastics.

== Background ==
Louisville was selected as the host of the event in December 2022.

== Competition schedule ==
The competition will feature senior and junior competitions for both women's and men's disciplines. The competition schedule was as follows (all times in eastern).

Friday, February 24:

- Winter Cup – Senior Men – Day 1, 1:30 p.m.
- Nastia Liukin Cup, 7:30 p.m.

Saturday, February 25:

- Winter Cup – Senior Women, 12:30 p.m.
- Elite Team Cup, 6:00 p.m.

Sunday, February 26:

- Winter Cup – Junior Women, 12:00 p.m.
- Winter Cup – Senior and Junior Men – Day 2, 5:30 p.m.

== Medalists ==
Event	Gold	Silver	Bronze
Senior Women
Individual all-around	Lexi Zeiss	Ashlee Sullivan	Nola Matthews
Vault	Joscelyn Roberson	Addison Fatta	Not awarded
Uneven bars	Zoe Miller	Charlotte Booth	Myli Lew
Balance beam	Skye Blakely	Joscelyn Roberson	Ashlee Sullivan
Floor	Kaliya Lincoln	Joscelyn Roberson	Ashlee Sullivan
Junior Women
Individual all-around	Hezly Rivera	Jayla Hang	Kieryn Finnell
Vault	Lailah Danzy Jayla Hang	Not awarded	Zoey Molomo
Uneven bars	Jayla Hang	Gabrielle Hardie	Zoey Molomo
Balance beam	Hezly Rivera	Kieryn Finnell	Claire Pease
Floor	Hezly Rivera	Gabrielle Hardie	Jayla Hang
Senior Men
Individual all-around	Yul Moldauer	Fred Richard	Asher Hong
Floor	Kameron Nelson	Shane Wiskus	Connor McCool
Pommel horse	Ian Skirkey	Ignacio Yockers	Stephen Nedoroscik
Rings	Alex Diab	Riley Loos	Shane Wiskus
Vault	Kameron Nelson	Not awarded	
Parallel bars	Curran Phillips	Blake Sun	Shane Wiskus
Horizontal bar	Curran Phillips	Landen Blixt	Ian Gunther

== Nastia Liukin Cup ==
2023 Nastia Liukin Cup
- Venue: Freedom Hall
- Location: Louisville, Kentucky, U.S.
- Dates: February 24, 2022
- Competitors: 40

Medalists
gold medal	Kailin Chio and Avery Neff (Senior); Addy Fulcher (Junior)
silver medal	None awarded (Senior); Olivia Vandevander and Imani White (Junior)
bronze medal	Madison Ulrich (Senior); None awarded (Junior)

The 14th annual Nastia Liukin Cup was held in conjunction with the 2023 Winter Cup. A total of 40 gymnasts advanced to the competition, making it one of the largest fields in the event's history.

=== Medal winners ===
Event	Gold	Silver	Bronze
Senior
All-around	Kailin Chio Avery Neff	—	Madison Ulrich
Junior
All-around	Addy Fulcher	Olivia Vandevander Imani White	—
