= 2024 United States Olympic trials =

The 2024 United States Olympic trials are a series of events held in multiple sports to determine United States representatives at the 2024 Summer Olympics. These events include:

- 2024 United States Olympic trials (gymnastics)
- 2024 United States Olympic trials (marathon)
- 2024 United States Olympic trials (swimming)
- 2024 United States Olympic trials (track and field)
- 2024 United States Olympic trials (wrestling)
