= Ioannis Chronopoulos =

Canadian artistic gymnast

- Ιωάννης Χρονόπουλος
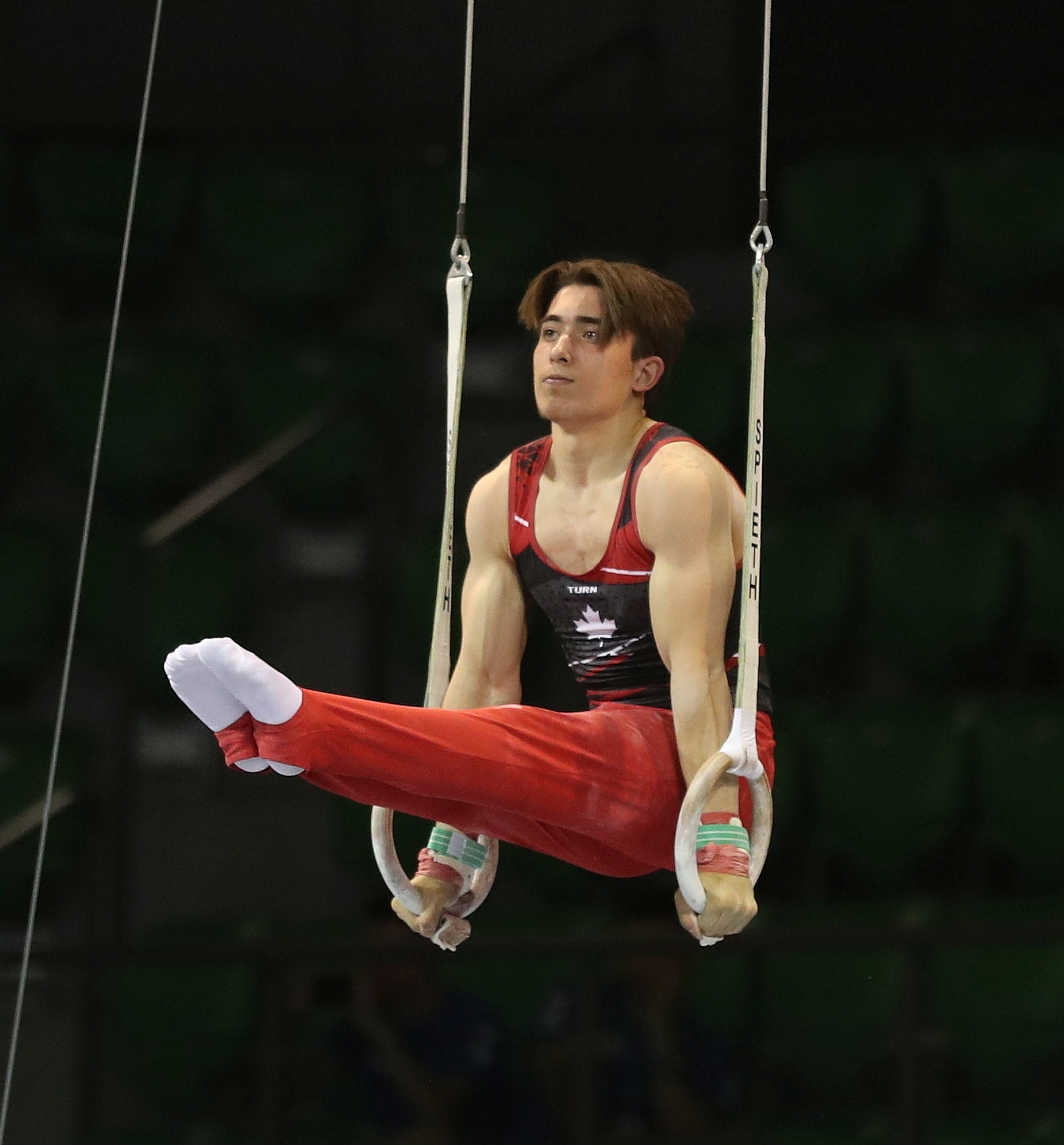
- Chronopoulos at the 2019 Junior World Championships

Personal information
- Nickname: Yanni
- Born: March 18, 2002 (age 24) Burlington, Ontario, Canada
- Height: 5 ft 10 in (178 cm)

Gymnastics career
- Discipline: Men's artistic gymnastics
- Country represented: Greece; (2026–present)
- Former countries represented: Canada (2019–2026)
- College team: Nebraska Cornhuskers (2021–2025)
Medal record
Men's artistic gymnastics
Representing Canada
Pan American Championships
Silver medal – second place	2025 Panama City	Team
World University Games
Silver medal – second place	2025 Rhine-Ruhr	Team

Ioannis "Yanni" Chronopoulos (born March 18, 2002) is a Canadian and Greek artistic gymnast. He competed in collegiate gymnastics for the Nebraska Cornhuskers. Representing Canada, he was a member of the silver medal-winning teams at the 2025 Pan American Championships and the 2025 World University Games. Starting in 2026, he began representing Greece in international competitions.

== Early life ==
Chronopoulos was born in 2002 to Nick and Iryna Chronopoulos. He was raised in Milton, Ontario.

When Chronopoulos was 14, he tore his ACL and had to undergo a special juvenile procedure in order to keep his growth plate in place.

== Gymnastics career ==
Chronopoulos competed at the inaugural Junior World Championships in summer 2019 alongside Félix Dolci and Evgeny Siminiuc. Together they placed fifth as a team.

In 2021 Chronopoulos began competing in NCAA gymnastics for the Nebraska Cornhuskers.

Chronopoulos was named as the alternate for the 2024 Olympic team. The following year he competed at the 2025 Pan American Championships where he helped Canada win silver behind the United States. Individually, he placed fifth on rings. The following month he competed at the 2025 World University Games alongside Matteo Bardana, Félix Dolci, William Émard, and Jayson Rampersad. Together they finished second behind Japan, earning Canada its first ever men's team medal at the FISU World University Games.

On July 9, 2026, Chronopoulos announced via Instagram that he would start representing Greece in international competition going forward. He made his debut for Greece at the 2026 European Championships where he qualified as an individual to compete at the 2026 World Championships.

== Competitive history ==
Competitive history of Ioannis Chronopoulos
Year	Event	Team	AA	FX	PH	SR	VT	PB	HB
2019
2019	Junior World Championships	5							
2021	NCAA Championships	4							
2022	NCAA Championships	4							
2023	NCAA Championships	5							
2023	Canadian Championships				1st place, gold medalist(s)	2nd place, silver medalist(s)		3rd place, bronze medalist(s)	1st place, gold medalist(s)
2023	World Championships	7 (Note: Chronopoulos was the Team CAN alternate)							
2024	Elite Canada				3rd place, bronze medalist(s)				
2024	NCAA Championships	4							
2024	Canadian Championships		5		3				
2025	Elite Canada		WD						
2025	NCAA Championships	4							
2025	Canadian Championships		3rd place, bronze medalist(s)		3				
2025	Pan American Championships	2nd place, silver medalist(s)				5			
2025	World University Games	2nd place, silver medalist(s)	11						
2026	Elite Canada				3rd place, bronze medalist(s)				6
2026	Canadian Championships		7			7		5	
2026	European Championships	19	30						
2026	Mediterranean Games	5							

== See also ==
- Nationality changes in gymnastics
