= Brandon Dang =

American gymnast (born 2005)

- Dang at the 2026 U.S. National Championships

Personal information
- Born: May 26, 2005 (age 21) San Jose, California, U.S.

Gymnastics career
- Discipline: Men's artistic gymnastics
- Country represented: United States; (2025–present)
- College team: Illinois Fighting Illini (2024–present)
- Head coach: Daniel Ribeiro
Medal record
Men's artistic gymnastics
Representing the United States
Pan American Championships
Gold medal – first place	2025 Panama City	Team
Gold medal – first place	2025 Panama City	Pommel horse
Bronze medal – third place	2026 Rio de Janeiro	Team
FIG World Cup
Event	1st	2nd	3rd
Apparatus World Cup	1	0	0
World Challenge Cup	0	0	1
Total	1	0	1

Brandon Han Dang (born May 26, 2005) is an American artistic gymnast who is a pommel horse specialist. He is a member of the United States men's national artistic gymnastics team.

== Early life ==
Dang was born to Eric and Lynne Dang and has a brother named Ethan who works at Padlet. He attended Evergreen Valley High School in San Jose, California, where he was a six-time national pommel horse champion.

== Gymnastics career ==
=== 2024 ===
In February 2024, Dang competed at the 2024 Winter Cup, and won bronze on pommel horse.

He began competing for the Illinois Fighting Illini men's gymnastics team in 2024. During the season, he was named CGA National Rookie of the Week three times, Big Ten Freshman of the Week five times, Big Ten Specialist of the Week two times, and Big Ten Freshman of the Year.

He competed at the 2024 U.S. National Gymnastics Championships and won bronze on pommel horse.

=== 2025 ===
In February 2025, he competed at the 2025 Winter Cup and won gold on pommel horse. As a result, he was named to the United States men's national artistic gymnastics team. He was selected to compete at the 2025 FIG World Cup. He made his international debut at the Baku World Cup and won gold on pommel horse.

During the 2025 NCAA season, he was named CGA Specialist of the Week four times and Big Ten Specialist of the Week five times. During the regular season, he was undefeated on pommel horse, going a perfect 7–0, and was named Big Ten Specialist of the Year.

Dang was selected to represent the United States at the Pan American Championships alongside Asher Hong, Taylor Christopulos, Taylor Burkhart, Joshua Karnes, and alternate Jun Iwai. During the event, he helped team USA win team gold. He also won gold on the pommel horse. In August, Dang competed at the National Championships where he placed on pommel horse behind Patrick Hoopes. After the competition, he was selected to compete at the 2025 World Championships alongside Hoopes, Asher Hong, Brody Malone, Kameron Nelson, and Donnell Whittenburg.

At the World Championships, Dang finished twenty-first on pommel horse during the qualification round and did not qualify for the event final.

=== 2026 ===
On May 11, 2026, Dang was selected to represent the United States at the 2026 Pan American Championships as a non-traveling replacement athlete. He replaced Donnell Whittenburg as the official traveling alternate. Since the United States won team bronze, Dang was also awarded the bronze as the alternate. At the 2026 U.S. National Championships, Dang won silver on pommel horse behind Patrick Hoopes.

Dang competed at the 2026 Paris World Challenge Cup where he won bronze on pommel horse behind Hamlet Manukyan and Gabriele Targhetta.

== Competitive history ==
Competitive history of Brandon Dang
Year	Event	Team	AA	FX	PH	SR	VT	PB	HB
2023	Winter Cup				4				
2024	Winter Cup				3rd place, bronze medalist(s)				
2024	Big Ten Championships				1st place, gold medalist(s)				
2024	NCAA Championships	5			4				
2024	U.S. National Championships				3rd place, bronze medalist(s)				
2025	Winter Cup				1st place, gold medalist(s)				
2025	Baku World Cup				1st place, gold medalist(s)				
2025	Antalya World Cup				6				
2025	Big Ten Championships				1st place, gold medalist(s)				
2025	NCAA Championships	6			31				
2025	Cairo World Cup				4				
2025	Pan American Championships	1st place, gold medalist(s)			1st place, gold medalist(s)				
2025	U.S. National Championships				2nd place, silver medalist(s)				
2025	World Championships				21				
2026	Cottbus World Cup				6				
2026	NCAA Championships	5			1st place, gold medalist(s)				
2026	Pan American Championships	3rd place, bronze medalist(s)							
2026	U.S. National Championships				2nd place, silver medalist(s)				
2026	Paris World Challenge Cup				3rd place, bronze medalist(s)				
