= 2025 U.S. National Gymnastics Championships =

2025 U.S. National Gymnastics Championships 2025 Xfinity U.S. Gymnastics Championships
- Venue: Smoothie King Center
- Location: New Orleans, Louisiana; United States
- Date: August 7–10, 2025

The 2025 U.S. National Gymnastics Championships, known as the 2025 Xfinity U.S. Gymnastics Championships, was the 61st edition of the U.S. National Gymnastics Championships. The competition was held at the Smoothie King Center in New Orleans, Louisiana from August 7–10, 2025.

At the event, Asher Hong won his second men's national all-around title, while Hezly Rivera won her first all-around women's national title.

== Competition schedule ==
The competition was as scheduled (in central time):

- Thursday, August 7: Men's gymnastics Day 1 – juniors at 1:30 p.m. and seniors at 7:00 p.m.
- Friday, August 8: Women's gymnastics Day 1 – juniors at 1:45 p.m. and seniors session 2 at 6:45 p.m.
- Saturday, August 9: Men's gymnastics Day 2 – juniors at 12:00 p.m. and seniors at 5:30 p.m.
- Sunday, August 10: Women's gymnastics Day 2 – juniors at 12:45 p.m. and seniors session 2 at 6:00 p.m.

The event was broadcast on NBC Sports and CNBC and live-streamed on USA Gymnastics' YouTube channel and Peacock.

== Sponsorship ==
Xfinity, the sponsor of the previous year's event, continued their sponsorship in 2025.

== Medalists ==
Event	Gold	Silver	Bronze
Senior Women
Individual all-around	Hezly Rivera	Leanne Wong	Joscelyn Roberson
Vault	Leanne Wong	Claire Pease	Izzy Stassi
Uneven bars	Skye Blakely Hezly Rivera	—N/a	Leanne Wong
Balance beam	Hezly Rivera	Skye Blakely	Jayla Hang Dulcy Caylor
Floor	Hezly Rivera	Joscelyn Roberson	Ashlee Sullivan
Junior Women
Individual all-around	Caroline Moreau	Isabella Anzola	Amia Pugh-Banks
Vault	Amia Pugh-Banks	Caroline Moreau	Addy Fulcher
Uneven bars	Charleigh Bullock	Caroline Moreau	Sydney Williams
Balance beam	Isabella Anzola	Caroline Moreau	Espy Chang
Floor	Caroline Moreau	Sydney Williams	Amia Pugh-Banks
Senior Men
Individual all-around	Asher Hong	Frederick Richard	Fuzzy Benas
Floor	Asher Hong	Kameron Nelson	Junnosuke Iwai
Pommel horse	Patrick Hoopes	Brandon Dang	Brody Malone
Rings	Asher Hong	Brody Malone	Donnell Whittenburg
Vault	Asher Hong	Kameron Nelson	Fuzzy Benas
Parallel bars	Brody Malone	Asher Hong	Donnell Whittenburg
Horizontal bar	Taylor Burkhart	Crew Bold	Frederick Richard
Junior Men (17–18)
Individual all-around	Maksim Kan	Hunter Simpson	Jay Watkins
Junior Men (15–16)
Individual all-around	Jakson Kurecki	Hunter Egan	Cooper Gunderson

== Results ==
=== Men ===
USA Gymnastics Men's Program Committee approved the use of a Senior Exponential Bonus based on a gymnast's difficulty score for this competition. Below are a gymnast's scores based on the FIG's Code of Points with the additional domestic bonus noted in parentheses below the FIG score.

Rank	Gymnast	Floor (gymnastics)	Pommel horse	Rings (gymnastics)	Vault (gymnastics)	Parallel bars	Horizontal bar	Day total	Total
1st place, gold medalist(s)	Asher Hong	14.400 (+0.408)	13.400	14.200 (+0.618)	13.950 (+1.109)	14.100	13.400	83.450 (+2.135)	170.020
1st place, gold medalist(s)	Asher Hong	14.800 (+0.408)	13.600	13.850 (+0.618)	14.150 (+1.109)	14.000	11.900	82.300 (+2.135)	170.020
2nd place, silver medalist(s)	Fred Richard	13.550 (+0.202)	12.750	13.100	14.050	12.750	13.450	79.649 (+0.202)	162.555
2nd place, silver medalist(s)	Fred Richard	13.800 (+0.202)	13.000	13.550	13.950	13.450 (+0.101)	14.650	82.400 (+0.303)	162.555
3rd place, bronze medalist(s)	Fuzzy Benas	14.050	13.350	12.350	14.250	13.450	13.350 (+0.305)	80.800 (+0.305)	162.310
3rd place, bronze medalist(s)	Fuzzy Benas	13.500	12.950	12.800	13.900	14.050	13.700 (+0.305)	80.900 (+0.305)	162.310
4	Colt Walker	13.350	13.200	12.950	13.750	14.000 (+0.408)	13.400	80.650 (+0.408)	161.560
4	Colt Walker	13.600	12.850	13.250	14.050	12.800 (+0.202)	13.750	80.300 (+0.202)	161.560
5	Joshua Karnes	13.650	13.650	12.600	14.000	13.550	12.250	79.700	160.802
5	Joshua Karnes	13.300	13.650	12.800	13.500	13.750	13.900 (+0.202)	80.900 (+0.202)	160.802
6	Jun Iwai	13.800 (+0.408)	10.650	13.200	14.300	13.100	13.600	78.650 (+0.408)	160.613
6	Jun Iwai	14.350 (+0.305)	12.500	13.150	14.300	13.400	13.550	81.250 (+0.305)	160.613
7	Alex Nitache	12.950	12.800	12.100	14.500 (+0.471)	13.000	13.300	78.650 (+0.471)	158.592
7	Alex Nitache	13.500	13.000	12.200	14.050 (+0.471)	13.250	13.000	79.000 (+0.471)	158.592
8	Sasha Bogonosiuk	13.700	12.750	11.550	14.150	13.200	13.150	78.500	157.300
8	Sasha Bogonosiuk	13.800	12.700	12.450	14.200	13.300	12.350	78.800	157.300
9	David Shamah	12.350	12.650	11.850	12.950	13.450	13.150	76.400	156.550
9	David Shamah	13.550	13.400	12.300	13.900	13.900	13.100	80.150	156.550
10	Danila Leykin	13.800	13.250	12.600	12.350	13.350	11.600	76.950	156.350
10	Danila Leykin	13.900	13.300	11.800	13.450	13.050	13.900	79.400	156.350
11	David Ramirez	12.650	13.150	12.900	14.100	12.700	13.050	78.550	156.350
11	David Ramirez	12.850	12.800	13.150	14.200	11.900	12.900	77.800	156.350
12	Drake Andrews	13.000	12.450	12.500	13.700	13.200	13.300	78.150	154.950
12	Drake Andrews	13.500	12.550	12.350	14.000	11.000	13.400	76.800	154.950
13	Dante Reive	13.900	11.850	13.750	12.850	11.200	12.750	76.300	154.600
13	Dante Reive	13.550	11.200	13.700	14.300	12.050	13.500	78.300	154.600
14	Kristian Grahovski	12.850	12.150	12.700	13.550	11.300	13.600	76.150	154.550
14	Kristian Grahovski	13.000	13.750	12.850	13.050	12.600	13.150	78.400	154.550
15	Nathan Roman	13.200	12.050	12.200	13.550	13.150	11.350	75.500	154.150
15	Nathan Roman	13.350	12.800	12.350	13.950	13.750	12.450	78.650	154.150
16	David Grossman	12.750	12.050	12.350	13.700	12.900	12.750	76.500	153.650
16	David Grossman	13.350	11.800	11.900	13.900	13.350	12.850	77.150	153.650
17	Taylor Christopulos	11.550	13.350	12.000	13.900	11.500	12.550	74.850	153.350
17	Taylor Christopulos	12.850	12.950	12.250	13.050	13.300	14.100	78.500	153.350
18	Kai Uemura	11.250	12.350	12.450	13.200	12.650	13.250	75.150	152.150
18	Kai Uemura	12.700	12.800	12.150	13.350	13.150	12.850	77.000	152.150
19	Jesse-Lee Pakele	13.450	11.050	12.000	13.300	12.050	12.250	74.100	152.050
19	Jesse-Lee Pakele	13.450	13.200	12.700	13.500	12.500	12.600	77.950	152.050
20	Alex Deubler	12.650	12.350	11.350	13.850	13.400	12.950	76.550	150.500
20	Alex Deubler	13.150	12.150	9.850	12.950	13.200	12.650	73.950	150.500
21	Krian Mandava	12.600	12.200	11.850	13.600	13.350	12.950	76.550	150.400
21	Krian Mandava	12.050	11.200	12.450	12.400	12.700	13.100	73.900	150.400
22	Joey Nieves	12.600	12.550	11.400	13.400	12.550	12.500	75.000	149.200
22	Joey Nieves	11.600	12.250	11.800	12.850	13.250	12.450	74.200	149.200
–	Taylor Burkhart	14.200 (+0.305)	–	13.550	14.350 (+0.217)	13.800	14.200 (+0.305)	70.100 (+0.827)	139.999
–	Taylor Burkhart	12.900	–	13.500	13.900 (+0.217)	14.100	14.150 (+0.305)	68.550 (+0.522)	139.999
–	Brody Malone	–	14.200 (+0.202)	13.650 (+0.408)	–	13.800	11.250	52.900 (+0.610)	112.419
–	Brody Malone	–	13.800	14.100 (+0.408)	–	14.350	15.200 (+1.051)	57.450 (+1.459)	112.419
–	Preston Ngai	11.550	14.150 (+0.408)	13.000	13.900	12.500	13.600	78.700 (+0.408)	105.608
–	Preston Ngai	–	13.450	13.050	–	–	–	26.500	105.608
–	Max Odden	12.300	11.800	12.200	13.850	12.150	13.650	75.950	101.550
–	Max Odden	–	12.400	–	13.200	–	–	25.600	101.550
–	Kameron Nelson	14.150 (+1.051)	–	13.150	14.600 (+0.471)	–	–	41.900 (+1.522)	86.544
–	Kameron Nelson	13.700 (+1.051)	–	13.300	14.600 (+0.471)	–	–	40.600 (+1.522)	86.544
–	Donnell Whittenburg	–	–	14.050 (+1.051)	–	13.850	13.400	41.300 (+1.051)	83.014
–	Donnell Whittenburg	–	–	12.500 (+0.513)	–	14.200	13.450	40.120 (+0.513)	83.014
–	Jackson Harrison	14.150	–	–	13.950	–	13.200	41.300	81.150
–	Jackson Harrison	13.800	–	–	14.200	–	11.850	39.850	81.150
–	Christopher Hiser	13.300	–	13.150	14.100	–	–	40.550	80.450
–	Christopher Hiser	13.050	–	13.350	13.500	–	–	13.900	80.450
–	Crew Bold	13.100	–	–	–	13.700	14.250 (+0.202)	41.050 (+0.202)	80.304
–	Crew Bold	11.400	–	–	–	13.750	13.700 (+0.202)	38.849 (+0.202)	80.304
–	Carson Eshleman	–	–	13.350	–	12.150	12.150	27.650	77.300
–	Carson Eshleman	–	–	12.100	–	13.250	14.300	39.650	77.300
–	Justin Park	13.150	11.950	12.000	13.550	12.700	11.850	75.200	75.200
–	Justin Park	–	–	–	–	–	–	0.000	75.200
–	Charlie Larson	14.150	–	–	13.800	–	–	27.950	55.800
–	Charlie Larson	13.950	–	–	13.900	–	–	27.850	55.800
–	Kelton Christiansen	–	13.000	–	–	–	13.400	26.400	52.800
–	Kelton Christiansen	–	13.050	–	–	–	13.350	26.400	52.800
–	Patrick Hoopes	–	15.050 (+0.725)	–	–	–	–	15.050 (+0.725)	31.300
–	Patrick Hoopes	–	14.800 (+0.725)	–	–	–	–	14.800 (+0.725)	31.300
–	Brandon Dang	–	14.850 (+0.618)	–	–	–	–	14.850 (+0.618)	31.093
–	Brandon Dang	–	14.900 (+0.725)	–	–	–	–	14.900 (+0.725)	31.093
–	Luke Esparo	–	–	13.200 (+0.408)	–	–	–	13.200 (+0.408)	27.966
–	Luke Esparo	–	–	13.950 (+0.408)	–	–	–	13.950 (+0.408)	27.966
–	Alex Diab	–	–	13.750	–	–	–	13.750	27.500
–	Alex Diab	–	–	13.750	–	–	–	13.750	27.500
–	Stephen Nedoroscik	–	14.200	–	–	–	–	14.200	27.400
–	Stephen Nedoroscik	–	13.200	–	–	–	–	13.200	27.400
–	Parker Thackston	–	13.350	–	–	–	–	13.350	27.305
–	Parker Thackston	–	13.650 (+0.305)	–	–	–	–	13.650 (+0.305)	27.305
–	Aaronson Mansberger	–	13.300 (+0.202)	–	–	–	–	13.300 (+0.202)	27.152
–	Aaronson Mansberger	–	13.650	–	–	–	–	13.650	27.152
Did not qualify to Day 2 of the competition
–	Nathan Underhill	13.300	11.100	12.600	12.750	13.500	11.600	73.500	—N/a
–	Alex Noel	12.550	11.450	11.650	13.500	11.600	12.700	73.450	—N/a
–	Jackson Rendon	11.650	12.200	12.200	13.700	10.850	12.100	72.700	—N/a
–	Joseph Hale	12.850	11.000	12.250	13.450	12.050	11.000	72.600	—N/a
–	Landon Simpson	11.600	10.950	11.400	12.300	12.950	13.000	72.200	—N/a
–	Tristen Nye	11.550	9.650	11.450	12.500	13.100	13.250	71.500	—N/a
–	Ethan Cox	12.550	11.850	10.900	13.250	10.600	11.450	70.600	—N/a
–	Oleksandr Shybitov	13.200	9.600	10.500	13.850	12.300	11.000	70.450	—N/a
–	Nick Cruz	10.500	10.050	12.150	13.800	12.150	11.700	70.350	—N/a
–	Michael Scheiner	13.000	12.900	11.600	12.550	–	12.700	62.750	—N/a
–	Tate Costa	13.650	12.650	–	–	12.150	13.150	51.600	—N/a
–	Tyler Shimizu	–	9.400	–	–	12.150	9.900	31.450	—N/a

=== Women ===
Rank	Gymnast	Vault (gymnastics)	Uneven bars	Balance beam	Floor (gymnastics)	Day total	Total
1st place, gold medalist(s)	Hezly Rivera	13.800	13.450	14.350	14.000	55.600	112.000
1st place, gold medalist(s)	Hezly Rivera	14.050	14.150	14.000	14.200	56.400	112.000
2nd place, silver medalist(s)	Leanne Wong	14.000	13.550	13.750	13.800	55.100	111.200
2nd place, silver medalist(s)	Leanne Wong	14.600	13.950	13.950	13.600	56.100	111.200
3rd place, bronze medalist(s)	Joscelyn Roberson	13.800	13.650	13.800	14.150	55.400	109.600
3rd place, bronze medalist(s)	Joscelyn Roberson	13.050	13.700	13.800	13.750	54.200	109.600
4	Ashlee Sullivan	14.000	12.050	13.650	14.000	53.700	107.950
4	Ashlee Sullivan	13.500	13.500	13.450	13.800	54.250	107.950
5	Simone Rose	13.500	13.350	13.100	13.500	53.450	107.900
5	Simone Rose	13.650	13.600	13.600	13.600	54.450	107.900
6	Jayla Hang	14.050	12.150	13.850	12.200	52.250	107.650
6	Jayla Hang	14.300	13.450	13.900	13.750	55.400	107.650
7	Gabrielle Hardie	13.800	13.200	12.900	13.850	53.750	106.850
7	Gabrielle Hardie	13.700	13.450	12.050	13.900	53.100	106.850
8	Dulcy Caylor	14.000	13.600	13.850	12.350	53.800	106.700
8	Dulcy Caylor	13.900	11.900	13.900	13.200	52.900	106.700
9	Tiana Sumanasekera	13.950	12.950	13.800	12.400	53.100	105.950
9	Tiana Sumanasekera	13.950	11.550	13.850	13.500	52.850	105.950
10	Claire Pease	13.300	12.350	13.900	12.050	51.600	105.550
10	Claire Pease	14.000	13.800	12.800	13.350	53.950	105.550
11	Alicia Zhou	12.850	13.650	12.950	12.500	51.950	104.750
11	Alicia Zhou	12.950	13.750	13.250	12.850	52.800	104.750
12	Izzy Stassi	13.550	13.400	13.150	13.200	53.300	104.050
12	Izzy Stassi	13.550	11.500	12.400	13.300	50.750	104.050
13	Harlow Buddendeck	12.850	13.050	13.100	13.000	52.000	104.000
13	Harlow Buddendeck	12.800	13.300	12.900	13.000	52.000	104.000
14	Nola Matthews	13.000	12.800	12.850	13.500	52.150	103.900
14	Nola Matthews	12.850	13.200	12.900	12.800	51.750	103.900
15	Brooke Pierson	13.450	13.250	12.800	12.950	52.450	103.450
15	Brooke Pierson	13.450	11.800	12.850	12.900	51.000	103.450
16	Reese Esponda	13.550	12.150	12.400	13.250	51.350	103.250
16	Reese Esponda	13.750	12.000	12.500	13.650	51.900	103.250
17	Ally Damelio	12.950	11.850	12.750	12.900	50.450	102.600
17	Ally Damelio	13.000	12.900	12.900	13.350	52.150	102.600
18	Jordis Eichman	13.100	13.250	11.950	12.950	51.250	102.300
18	Jordis Eichman	13.100	13.150	12.450	12.350	51.050	102.300
19	Annalisa Milton	13.050	13.100	12.400	12.750	51.300	101.900
19	Annalisa Milton	13.800	12.950	11.250	12.600	50.600	101.900
20	Catherine Guy	13.100	12.300	12.500	12.650	50.550	100.600
20	Catherine Guy	12.600	12.300	12.750	12.400	50.050	100.600
–	Skye Blakely	–	13.250	13.450	–	26.700	55.450
–	Skye Blakely	–	14.350	14.400	–	28.750	55.450
–	Tatum Drusch	–	12.000	12.800	–	24.800	50.650
–	Tatum Drusch	–	13.250	12.600	–	25.850	50.650
–	Alessia Rosa	13.600	12.550	9.950	–	36.100	48.750
–	Alessia Rosa	–	12.650	–	–	12.650	48.750

== Women's national team ==
After the competition, the following female athletes were named to the senior national team: Skye Blakely, Dulcy Caylor, Jayla Hang, Gabrielle Hardie, Claire Pease, Hezly Rivera, Joscelyn Roberson, Simone Rose, Ashlee Sullivan, Tiana Sumanasekera and Leanne Wong.

The following female athletes were named to the junior national team: Isabella Anzola, Charleigh Bullock, Espy Chang, Lavi Crain, Aulya Daniels, Addy Fulcher, Caroline Moreau, Amia Pugh-Banks, Kaylee Sath, Kylie Smith, Addalye VanGrinsven and Trinity Wood.

== Men's national team ==
After the competition the following male athletes were named to the senior national team: Fuzzy Benas, Taylor Burkhart, Crew Bold, Brandon Dang, Asher Hong, Patrick Hoopes, Jun Iwai, Josh Karnes, Riley Loos, Brody Malone, Kameron Nelson, Dante Reive, Frederick Richard, Donnell Whittenburg and Colt Walker. The five athletes named to the senior development team were Sasha Bogonosiuk, Danila Leykin, Preston Ngai, Alex Nitache and Nathan Roman.

The following male athletes were named to the junior national team: Peyton Boerner, Hayden Brown, Lincoln Dubin, Hunter Egan, Cooper Gunderson, Elijah Gutierrez, Kiefer Hong, Maksim Kan, Jakson Kurecki, Jovan Jimeno, Ori Reilly, Hunter Simpson, Anthony Ruscheinsky and Jay Watkins.

This competition also served as selection for the 2025 World Championships and the 2025 Junior World Championships. For the senior edition the following athletes were selected: Dang, Hong, Hoopes, Malone, Nelson, and Whittenburg with Burkhart serving as the non-traveling replacement athlete. For the junior edition, the following athletes were selected: Leykin, Reive, and Roman with Kan serving as the traveling replacement athlete and Simpson as the non-traveling replacement athlete.

== Participants ==
The following athletes qualified to compete at this event:

=== Senior women ===
- Skye Blakely (University of Florida)
- Harlow Buddendeck (RGA)
- Dulcy Caylor (World Champions Centre)
- Ally Damelio (San Mateo Gymnastics)
- Tatum Drusch (Flips Gymnastics)
- Jordis Eichman (World Champions Centre)
- Reese Esponda (World Champions Centre)
- Catherine Guy (Pacific Reign Gymnastics)
- Jayla Hang (Pacific Reign Gymnastics)
- Gabrielle Hardie (Twin City Twisters)
- Myli Lew (San Mateo Gymnastics)
- Nola Matthews (Airborne Gymnastics)
- Annalisa Milton (GAGE)
- Claire Pease (WOGA)
- Brooke Pierson (World Champions Centre)
- Hezly Rivera (WOGA)
- Joscelyn Roberson (University of Arkansas)
- Alessia Rosa (Hill's Gymnastics)
- Simone Rose (Pacific Reign Gymnastics)
- Izzy Stassi (Gym X-Treme)
- Ashlee Sullivan (Metroplex Gymnastics)
- Tiana Sumanasekera (World Champions Centre)
- Leanne Wong (University of Florida)
- Alicia Zhou (Love Gymnastics)

=== Junior women ===
- Isabella Anzola (WOGA)
- Sophia Buechler (Midwest Gymnastics Center)
- Charleigh Bullock (Capital Gymnastics)
- Espy Chang (Pacific Reign Gymnastics)
- Lavi Crain (GAGE)
- Vivi Crain (GAGE)
- Aulya Daniels (GAGE)
- Addy Fulcher (Georgia Elite)
- Anslee McCauley (Georgia All-Star)
- Amariah Moore (First State)
- Caroline Moreau (Texas Dreams Gymnastics)
- Amia Pugh-Banks (World Class Gymnastics)
- Lila Richardson (Hopes and Dreams Gymnastics)
- Kaylee Sath (GAGE)
- Elaina Sliney (Cincinnati Gymnastics)
- Kylie Smith (Cincinnati Gymnastics)
- Addalye VanGrinsven (Pacific Reign Gymnastics)
- Sydney Williams (Metroplex Gymnastics)
- Trinity Wood (Capital Gymnastics)

=== Senior men ===
- Drake Andrews (Ohio State University)
- Fuzzy Benas (University of Oklahoma)
- Sasha Bogonosiuk (University of Oklahoma)
- Crew Bold (University of Michigan)
- Taylor Burkhart (Stanford University)
- Kelton Christiansen (University of Oklahoma)
- Taylor Christopulos (University of Nebraska)
- Tate Costa (University of Illinois)
- Ethan Cox (University of Nebraska)
- Nick Cruz (University of Oklahoma)
- Brandon Dang (University of Illinois)
- Alex Deubler (University of Oklahoma)
- Alex Diab (EVO Gymnastics)
- Carson Eshleman (University of Michigan)
- Luke Esparo (Penn State University)
- Kristian Grahovski (Ohio State University)
- David Grossman (Minnesota Men's Gymnastics)
- Joseph Hale (Crenshaw Athletic Club)
- Dallas Hale (5280 Gymnastics)
- Jackson Harrison (EVO Gymnastics)
- Christopher Hiser (University of Nebraska)
- Asher Hong (Stanford University)
- Patrick Hoopes (U.S. Air Force Academy)
- Junnosuke Iwai (Texas Dreams Gymnastics)
- Josh Karnes (Penn State University)
- Charlie Larson (University of Michigan)
- Danila Leykin (EVO Gymnastics)
- Brody Malone (EVO Gymnastics)
- Kiran Mandava (Stanford University)
- Aaronson Mansberger (University of Michigan)
- Stephen Nedoroscik (EVO Gymnastics)
- Kameron Nelson (Ohio State University)
- Preston Ngai (University of Illinois)
- Joey Nieves (5280 Gymnastics)
- Alex Nitache (University of Nebraska)
- Alex Noel (University of Oklahoma)
- Tristen Nye (Above the Barre Gymnastics)
- Max Odden (University of Nebraska)
- Jesse-Lee Pakele (Ohio State University)
- Justin Park (Agility)
- David Ramirez (Ohio State University)
- Dante Reive (United States Military Academy)
- Jackson Rendon (University of Oklahoma)
- Fred Richard (University of Michigan)
- Nathan Roman (University of Oklahoma)
- Michael Scheiner (Capital Gymnastics)
- David Shamah (Stanford University)
- Tyler Shimizu (University of California, Berkeley)
- Oleksandr Shybitov (University of Nebraska)
- Landon Simpson (Penn State University)
- Parker Thackston (Ohio State University)
- Kai Uemura (Stanford University)
- Nathan Underhill (Salto Gymnastics Center)
- Colt Walker (Stanford University)
- Donnell Whittenburg (EVO Gymnastics)
