= Gabrielle Hardie =

American artistic gymnast (born 2009)

- Nickname: Gabby
- Born: November 19, 2009 (age 16) Sioux Falls, South Dakota, U.S.

Gymnastics career
- Discipline: Women's artistic gymnastics
- Country represented: United States (2025–2026)
- Club: Twin City Twisters
- Head coach: Steve Hafeman
Medal record
Representing the United States
Pan American Championships
Gold medal – first place	2025 Panama City	Team
Gold medal – first place	2025 Panama City	Uneven bars
Bronze medal – third place	2025 Panama City	Floor exercise

Gabrielle Hardie (born November 19, 2009) is an American artistic gymnast. She is the 2025 Pan American champion on the uneven bars.

== Junior gymnastics career ==
=== 2023 ===
Hardie competed at the 2023 City of Jesolo Trophy where she won gold in the all-around and on uneven bars, and silver on balance beam, and floor exercise.

In August, she competed at the 2023 National Championships where she won silver on uneven bars and floor exercise, and placed fourth in the all-around

=== 2024 ===
In April, she competed at the American Classic, and won gold in the all-around, and floor exercise, and silver on uneven bars.

In May, she competed at the 2024 Pan American Championships, where she helped team USA win team gold. Individually, she gold on uneven bars, and floor exercise, and silver on balance beam and in the all-around. The following month she competed at the 2024 National Championships, where she won silver on uneven bars and in the all-around, and bronze on vault.

== Senior gymnastics career ==
=== 2025 ===
Hardie was scheduled to compete at the 2025 Winter Cup, however, she had to withdraw from the competition due to injury.

In May, she was selected to compete at the 2025 Pan American Championships alongside Dulcy Caylor, Jayla Hang, Hezly Rivera, Tiana Sumanasekera, and alternate Alessia Rosa. At the competition she made her senior national team debut and helped team USA win team gold. During the event finals, she won gold on the uneven bars and bronze on floor exercise behind Lia Monica Fontaine and Hang.

== Competitive history ==
Competitive history of Gabrielle Hardie at the junior level
Year	Event	Team	AA	VT	UB	BB	FX
2023	Winter Cup		5		2nd place, silver medalist(s)	6	2nd place, silver medalist(s)
2023	City of Jesolo Trophy		1st place, gold medalist(s)	2nd place, silver medalist(s)	1st place, gold medalist(s)	2nd place, silver medalist(s)	2nd place, silver medalist(s)
2023	U.S. National Championships		4		2nd place, silver medalist(s)		2nd place, silver medalist(s)
2024
2024	Pan American Championships	1st place, gold medalist(s)	2nd place, silver medalist(s)		1st place, gold medalist(s)	2nd place, silver medalist(s)	1st place, gold medalist(s)
2024	U.S. National Championships		2nd place, silver medalist(s)	3rd place, bronze medalist(s)	2nd place, silver medalist(s)		

Competitive history of Gabrielle Hardie at the senior level
Year	Event	Team	AA	VT	UB	BB	FX
2025
2025	Pan American Championships	1st place, gold medalist(s)			1st place, gold medalist(s)		3rd place, bronze medalist(s)
2025	U.S. Classic		16		13	23	3rd place, bronze medalist(s)
2025	U.S. National Championships		7		7	19	4
