= Joshua Karnes =

American gymnast (born 2004)

- Karnes at the 2026 U.S. National Championships

Personal information
- Full name: Joshua Andrew Karnes
- Born: July 6, 2004 (age 22) Erie, Pennsylvania, U.S.

Gymnastics career
- Discipline: Men's artistic gymnastics
- Country represented: United States; (2025–present)
- College team: Penn State Nittany Lions
- Head coach: Jacob Marks
Medal record
Men's artistic gymnastics
Representing the United States
Pan American Championships
Gold medal – first place	2025 Panama City	Team
Silver medal – second place	2025 Panama City	All-around
Silver medal – second place	2025 Panama City	Pommel horse
Silver medal – second place	2025 Panama City	Horizontal bar

Joshua Andrew Karnes (born July 6, 2004) is an American artistic gymnast.

== Early life and education ==
Karnes attended Erie High School in Erie, Pennsylvania, before enrolling at Pennsylvania State University to pursue gymnastics.

== Gymnastics career ==
=== 2023 ===
In February 2023, Karnes competed at the 2023 Winter Cup and placed fourth on floor exercise and seventh in the all-around. In April, during the 2023 NCAA men's gymnastics championship, he won bronze on parallel bars, placed fourth in the all-around and seventh on vault.

In August 2023, he competed at the World University Games where he helped the USA finish fourth as a team. Individually, he finished sixth in the all-around.

=== 2024 ===
In February 2024, he competed at the 2024 Winter Cup and won silver on floor exercise and placed ninth in the all-around. In April, during the 2024 NCAA men's gymnastics championship, he won bronze on parallel bars.

He then competed at the 2024 National Championships and placed seventeenth in the all-around. He suffered a concussion during the event. Six days before the 2024 Olympic Trials, he passed a concussion test and was cleared to compete. At the Olympic trials, he placed eighth on horizontal bar.

=== 2025 ===
Karnes was selected to represent the United States at the 2025 Pan American Championships alongside Taylor Burkhart, Taylor Christopulos, Brandon Dang, Asher Hong, and alternate Jun Iwai. During the event, he helped team USA win team gold. He also won silver on pommel horse, horizontal bar, and in the all-around with a score of 79.900. Following his time at Penn State, Karnes planned to move to EVO Gymnastics to continue his training after the 2025 U.S. National Gymnastics Championships.

== Personal life ==
Karnes was born to Jim and Monica Karnes, and has two brothers, Tony and Nick, and one sister, Abby. In 2017, he competed on Little Big Shots.

== Competitive history ==
Competitive history of Joshua Karnes
Year	Event	Team	AA	FX	PH	SR	VT	PB	HB
2023	Winter Cup		7	4					
2023	NCAA Championships	6	4				7	3rd place, bronze medalist(s)	
2023	World University Games	4	6						
2024	Winter Cup		9	2nd place, silver medalist(s)	9	10		16	19
2024	NCAA Championships		5					3rd place, bronze medalist(s)	
2024	U.S. National Championships							7	
2024	Olympic Trials								8
2025	NCAA Championships	5	6					7	
2025	Pan American Championships	1st place, gold medalist(s)	2nd place, silver medalist(s)		2nd place, silver medalist(s)			5	2nd place, silver medalist(s)
2025	U.S. National Championships		5	12	7	17		9	14
2026	Winter Cup				5	4		3rd place, bronze medalist(s)	6
2026	DTB Pokal Team Challenge	1st place, gold medalist(s)							
2026	U.S. National Championships		4	9	8	9		7	5
2026	Arthur Gander Memorial		10						
2026	Swiss Cup	4							
