= Kameron Nelson (gymnast) =

American artistic gymnast

- Nelson at the 2026 U.S. National Championships

Personal information
- Nickname: Triple back guy
- Born: August 2, 2001 (age 25) Coeur d'Alene, Idaho, U.S.
- Height: 5 ft 7 in (170 cm)

Gymnastics career
- Discipline: Men's artistic gymnastics
- Country represented: United States; (2023, 2025–present)
- College team: Ohio State Buckeyes (2021–2025)
- Gym: EVO Gymnastics; Haydens Gymnastics; Avant Coeur Gymnastics
- Head coach: Syque Caesar
- Former coaches: Rustam Sharipov; Dan Hayden
Medal record
Men's artistic gymnastics
Representing the United States
Pan American Championships
Bronze medal – third place	2026 Rio de Janeiro	Team
FIG World Cup
Event / 1st / 2nd / 3rd; Apparatus World Cup / 0 / 0 / 1

Kameron Nelson (born August 2, 2001) is an American artistic gymnast. He won the national vault title at the 2023 and 2026 National Championships. He was part of the bronze medal winning team at the 2026 Pan American Championships. He competed collegiately for the Ohio State Buckeyes.

== Early life and education ==
Nelson was born August 2, 2001, in Coeur d'Alene, Idaho, to Christy and Marvin Nelson. As a military family, Nelson moved frequently. He began gymnastics at six years old when his mother, a former level 10 gymnast and coach, got him involved when the family was living in Louisiana. Nelson and family moved to Georgia, where he was coached by Dan Hayden. Nelson was home schooled and later enrolled at Ohio State University to pursue gymnastics.

== Gymnastics career ==
Nelson qualified for and competed at the 2017 U.S. National Gymnastics Championships in the junior divisions. He walked on to the Ohio State Buckeyes men's gymnastics team as he had a previous encounter with Buckeyes assistant coach Casimiro Suárez. He was the vault champion at the 2023 Winter Cup and the 2023 U.S. National Gymnastics Championships. As a member of the United States men's national artistic gymnastics team, Nelson participated at 2023 FIG World Cup Cairo. He qualified for event finals on the floor exercise and vault where he placed 8th and 5th respectively.

He won the vault title again at the 2024 Winter Cup and placed second at the 2025 Winter Cup. Nelson trained triple back somersaults starting when he was a teenager and is known as the "triple back guy".

In January 2025, Nelson became the first gymnast in history to use two triple somersaults in a single floor routine. At the 2025 NCAA men's gymnastics championship, Nelson won the vault title and placed third on the floor exercise. In August of that year, Nelson competed at the National Championships, where he won silver on floor exercise and vault behind Asher Hong on both. After the competition, he was selected to compete at the 2025 World Championships alongside Hong, Brandon Dang, Patrick Hoopes, Brody Malone, and Donnell Whittenburg. At the World Championships, Nelson qualified for the floor exercise final in third place behind Jake Jarman and Carlos Yulo. During the event final he finished fourth.

In November 2025, Nelson joined EVO Gymnastics to continue his gymnastics training under coach Syque Caesar. At the 2026 World Cup Series in Cottbus, Germany, held on February 19-22, he won a bronze on rings. In Osijek, Croatia, held on April 9-12, he was the number 1 qualifier on the floor apparatus, but just missed the podium on both the floor and vault finals.

On May 11, 2026, Nelson was selected to represent the United States at the 2026 Pan American Championships. At the competition he helped the USA win bronze in the team event. Individually, he qualified for the vault event final. At the 2026 U.S. National Championships, Nelson placed first on vault, second on rings, and third on floor exercise. At the conclusion of the competition, he was selected to compete at the 2026 World Championships alongside Shane Wiskus, Danila Leykin, Patrick Hoopes, Fred Richard, and alternate Yul Moldauer.

== Competitive history ==
Competitive history of Kameron Nelson
Year	Event	Team	AA	FX	PH	SR	VT	PB	HB
2022	NCAA Championships	5							
2022	U.S. Classic		26	6	32	16	7	35	11
2022	U.S. National Championships		15	9	32	17	7	21	25
2023	Winter Cup			1st place, gold medalist(s)		11	1st place, gold medalist(s)		
2023	NCAA Championships		6	3rd place, bronze medalist(s)	40	25	5	32	36
2023	Cairo World Cup			8			5		
2023	U.S. Classic					55		65	52
2023	U.S. National Championships		20	24	31	21	1st place, gold medalist(s)	32	30
2024	Winter Cup			6		7	1st place, gold medalist(s)		
2024	NCAA Championships	6		7					
2025	Winter Cup			6		13	2nd place, silver medalist(s)	23	
2025	NCAA Championships			3rd place, bronze medalist(s)			1st place, gold medalist(s)		
2025	U.S. National Championships			2nd place, silver medalist(s)		10	2nd place, silver medalist(s)		
2025	World Championships	—N/a		4					
2026	Cottbus World Cup			5		3rd place, bronze medalist(s)			
2026	DTB Pokal Team Challenge	1st place, gold medalist(s)				1st place, gold medalist(s)	3rd place, bronze medalist(s)		
2026	Osijek World Cup			4			4		
2026	Pan American Championships	3rd place, bronze medalist(s)					5		
2026	U.S. National Championships			3rd place, bronze medalist(s)		2nd place, silver medalist(s)	1st place, gold medalist(s)		
2026	World Championships	6							
