= Jun Iwai =

American gymnast

- Iwai at the 2026 U.S. National Championships

Personal information
- Full name: Junnosuke Iwai
- Born: June 12, 2006 (age 20) Japan
- Relatives: Norimasa Iwai (father)

Gymnastics career
- Discipline: Men's artistic gymnastics
- Country represented: United States; (2025–present)
- College team: Stanford Cardinal (2026–present)
- Training location: Lewisville, Texas, U.S.
- Gym: Texas Dreams Gymnastics
Medal record
Men's artistic gymnastics
Representing the United States
Pan American Championships
| Gold medal – first place | 2025 Panama City | Team |
| Gold medal – first place | 2025 Panama City | Floor exercise |
FIG World Cup
Event / 1st / 2nd / 3rd; Apparatus World Cup / 0 / 1 / 0

Junnosuke Iwai (born June 12, 2006) is an American artistic gymnast. He is a member of the United States men's national artistic gymnastics team and competes in collegiate gymnastics for Stanford. He is the 2025 Pan American Champion on floor exercise and the 2026 NCAA co-champion on vault.

== Gymnastics career ==
=== 2024 ===
In early 2024, Iwai competed at the Winter Cup and placed first in the junior division. Additionally, he helped Division 3 win the Elite Team Cup.

In November, Iwai signed his National Letter of Intent for the Stanford Cardinal.

=== 2025 ===
Iwai began competing at the senior level in 2025. He made his senior debut at the 2025 Winter Cup, placing fifth in the all-around. During the event finals, he placed second on floor exercise and sixth on parallel bars. As a result he was added to the senior national team.

Iwai made his senior international debut at the DTB Pokal Team Challenge alongside Riley Loos, Taylor Christopulos, Kiran Mandava, and Kai Uemura. Together, they finished as the second-placed team behind Japan. Individually Iwai won bronze on floor exercise behind Artem Dolgopyat and Lorenzo Minh Casali and silver on horizontal bar behind Yumin Abbadini. He next competed at the Osijek World Cup where he qualified to the floor exercise and horizontal bar finals, winning silver on the former. In May Iwai was selected as the traveling alternate for the team to compete at the Pan American Championships alongside Taylor Burkhart, Asher Hong, Taylor Christopulos, Brandon Dang, and Joshua Karnes. Before the start of the qualification round teammate Hong fell sick and Iwai was substituted in. He helped the USA qualify for the team final in first place, and he qualified for the floor exercise final. However, during the qualification round teammate Burkhart tweaked his back and had to withdraw from apparatus finals, leading Iwai to qualify additionally to the parallel bars and horizontal bar finals. During the team final, Iwai contributed scores on all apparatuses except the pommel horse towards the USA's first-place finish. During apparatus finals, Iwai won gold on floor exercise and finished eighth and fourth on parallel bars and horizontal bar, respectively.

== Competitive history ==
Competitive history of Jun Iwai
| Year | Event | Team | AA | FX | PH | SR | VT | PB | HB |
|---|---|---|---|---|---|---|---|---|---|
| 2024 | Elite Team Cup | 1st place, gold medalist(s) | | | | | | | |
| 2024 | Winter Cup (junior) | | 1st place, gold medalist(s) | 2nd place, silver medalist(s) | | 5 | 2nd place, silver medalist(s) | | |
| 2025 | Winter Cup | | 5 | 2nd place, silver medalist(s) | 17 | 11 | | 6 | 11 |
| 2025 | DTB Pokal Team Challenge | 2nd place, silver medalist(s) | | 3rd place, bronze medalist(s) | | | | | 2nd place, silver medalist(s) |
| 2025 | Osijek World Cup | | | 2nd place, silver medalist(s) | | | | | 8 |
| 2025 | Pan American Championships | 1st place, gold medalist(s) | | 1st place, gold medalist(s) | | | | 8 | 4 |
| 2025 | U.S. National Championships | | 6 | 3rd place, bronze medalist(s) | 30 | 11 | | 13 | 7 |
| 2026 | Winter Cup | | 7 | 21 | 30 | 11 | | 17 | 4 |
| 2026 | DTB Pokal Team Challenge | 1st place, gold medalist(s) | | | | | | | |
| 2026 | NCAA Championships | 1st place, gold medalist(s) | | 29 | | | 1st place, gold medalist(s) | | 22 |
| 2026 | U.S. National Championships | | 12 | 2nd place, silver medalist(s) | 33 | 22 | | 23 | 7 |
