= 2024 United States Olympic trials (gymnastics) =

2024 U.S. Olympic trials
- Venue: Target Center
- Location: Minneapolis, Minnesota
- Date: June 27–30, 2024
- Competitors: see participants

The 2024 United States Olympic gymnastics team trials were the Olympic gymnastics team trials held June 27–30, 2024 at the Target Center in Minneapolis, Minnesota. At the conclusion of the event USA Gymnastics named the men's and women's team to represent the United States at the 2024 Summer Olympics in Paris.

== Venue ==
In June 2023, USA Gymnastics announced that the 2024 Olympic trials would be held at the Target Center in Minneapolis.

== Participants ==
The participants qualified via the 2024 U.S. National Gymnastics Championships in Fort Worth, Texas. Shilese Jones withdrew prior to the National Championships and petitioned. Kaliya Lincoln and Curran Phillips withdrew partway through the National Championships and also petitioned. All three petitions were accepted.

=== Women ===
| Name | Hometown | Club | Nationals |
|---|---|---|---|
| Simone Biles | Spring, Texas | World Champions Centre | 1st place, gold medalist(s) |
| ~~Skye Blakely~~ (Note: Blakely was injured (Achilles tendon) during podium training and withdrew from the competition) | Frisco, Texas | WOGA Gymnastics | 2nd place, silver medalist(s) |
| Jade Carey | Phoenix, Arizona | Oregon State University | 7th |
| Dulcy Caylor | Spring, Texas | World Champions Centre | 14th |
| Jordan Chiles | Vancouver, Washington | World Champions Centre | 5th |
| ~~Kayla DiCello~~ (Note: DiCello was injured (Achilles tendon) during her vault on day one of trials and withdrew from the competition) | Boyds, Maryland | Hill's Gymnastics | 3rd place, bronze medalist(s) |
| ~~Shilese Jones~~ (Note: Jones was injured (ACL and meniscus) during her vault warm-up on day one of trials and withdrew from the competition) | Auburn, Washington | Ascend Gymnastics Center | Petitioned |
| Suni Lee | St. Paul, Minnesota | Midwest Gymnastics Center | 4th |
| Kaliya Lincoln | Frisco, Texas | WOGA Gymnastics | Petitioned |
| Eveylynn Lowe | Blue Springs, Missouri | GAGE | 13th |
| Zoey Molomo | Frisco, Texas | Metroplex Gymnastics | 11th |
| Hezly Rivera | Oradell, New Jersey | WOGA Gymnastics | 6th |
| Joscelyn Roberson | Texarkana, Texas | World Champions Centre | 10th |
| Simone Rose | Sammamish, Washington | Pacific Reign Gymnastics | 12th |
| Tiana Sumanasekera | Pleasanton, California | World Champions Centre | 9th |
| Leanne Wong | Overland Park, Kansas | University of Florida | 8th |

=== Men ===
| Name | Hometown | Club | Nationals |
|---|---|---|---|
| Fuzzy Benas | Richmond, Texas | University of Oklahoma | 11th |
| Jeremy Bischoff | Santa Clarita, California | Stanford University | 12th |
| Cameron Bock | Tustin, California | University of Michigan | 8th |
| Tate Costa | Narragansett, Rhode Island | University of Illinois | 25th |
| Alex Diab | Hinsdale, Illinois | EVO Gymnastics | – |
| Asher Hong | Tomball, Texas | Stanford University | 10th |
| Patrick Hoopes | Lehi, Utah | U.S. Air Force Academy | – |
| Paul Juda | Deerfield, Illinois | University of Michigan | 6th |
| Josh Karnes | Erie, Pennsylvania | Pennsylvania State University | 17th |
| Brody Malone | Aragon, Georgia | EVO Gymnastics | 1st place, gold medalist(s) |
| Kiran Mandava | Cypress, Texas | Cypress Academy | 20th |
| Yul Moldauer | Arvada, Colorado | 5280 Gymnastics | 4th |
| Stephen Nedoroscik | Worcester, Massachusetts | EVO Gymnastics | – |
| Curran Phillips | Naperville, Illinois | EVO Gymnastics | Petitioned |
| Fred Richard | Stoughton, Massachusetts | University of Michigan | 2nd place, silver medalist(s) |
| Kai Uemura | Chicago, Illinois | Lakeshore Academy | 23th |
| Colt Walker | Cedar Park, Texas | Stanford University | 9th |
| Donnell Whittenburg | Baltimore, Maryland | Salto Gymnastics | 7th |
| Shane Wiskus | Spring Park, Minnesota | EVO Gymnastics | 5th |
| Khoi Young | Bowie, Maryland | Stanford University | 3rd place, bronze medalist(s) |

== Broadcasting and schedule ==
The competition will be broadcast exclusively on NBC and streamed via its content platform Peacock and USA Network. The schedule is as follows (all times in CT):

- June 27: Men's olympic team trials, Day 1

4:15 p.m: Doors open
5:25 p.m: Opening ceremony
5:45 p.m: Competition

- June 28: Women's olympic team trials, Day 1

5:10 p.m: Doors open
6:25 p.m: Opening ceremony
6:40 p.m: Competition

- June 29: Men's olympic team trials, Day 2

12:45 p.m: Doors open
1:55 p.m: Opening ceremony
2:15 p.m: Competition

- June 30: Women's olympic team trials, Day 2

5:40 p.m: Doors open
6:55 p.m: Opening ceremony
7:10 p.m: Competition

== Medalists ==
| Event | Gold | Silver | Bronze |
|---|---|---|---|
Women
| Individual all-around | Simone Biles | Sunisa Lee | Jordan Chiles |
| Vault (Note: Simone Biles only completed one vault with a score of 15.975 on day 1 and 15.500 on day 2, leaving her ineligible for a medal.) | Jade Carey | Jordan Chiles | Leanne Wong |
| Uneven bars | Sunisa Lee | Simone Biles | Jordan Chiles |
| Balance beam | Hezly Rivera Joscelyn Roberson | Not awarded | Tiana Sumanasekera |
| Floor | Simone Biles | Jade Carey | Jordan Chiles |
Men
| Individual all-around | Fred Richard | Brody Malone | Shane Wiskus |
| Floor | Shane Wiskus | Paul Juda | Fred Richard |
| Pommel horse | Patrick Hoopes | Stephen Nedoroscik | Paul Juda |
| Rings | Asher Hong | Alex Diab | Donnell Whittenburg |
| Vault | Donnell Whittenburg | Not awarded | |
| Parallel bars | Curran Phillips | Fred Richard | Colt Walker |
| Horizontal bar | Fred Richard | Shane Wiskus | Brody Malone |

== Results ==
=== Women ===
| Rank | Gymnast | Vault | Uneven bars | Balance beam | Floor exercise | Day total | Total |
|---|---|---|---|---|---|---|---|
| 1st place, gold medalist(s) | Simone Biles | 15.975 | 14.425 | 13.650 | 14.850 | 58.900 | 117.225 |
| 1st place, gold medalist(s) | Simone Biles | 15.500 | 14.200 | 13.900 | 14.725 | 58.325 | 117.225 |
| 2nd place, silver medalist(s) | Suni Lee | 13.525 | 14.400 | 14.400 | 13.700 | 56.025 | 111.675 |
| 2nd place, silver medalist(s) | Suni Lee | 14.100 | 14.875 | 12.825 | 13.850 | 55.650 | 111.675 |
| 3rd place, bronze medalist(s) | Jordan Chiles | 14.325 | 14.350 | 13.625 | 14.100 | 56.400 | 111.425 |
| 3rd place, bronze medalist(s) | Jordan Chiles | 14.500 | 14.200 | 12.225 | 14.100 | 55.025 | 111.425 |
| 4 | Jade Carey | 14.600 | 13.575 | 13.575 | 14.075 | 55.825 | 111.350 |
| 4 | Jade Carey | 14.675 | 13.075 | 13.625 | 14.150 | 55.525 | 111.350 |
| 5 | Hezly Rivera | 13.575 | 14.025 | 13.700 | 13.525 | 54.825 | 111.150 |
| 5 | Hezly Rivera | 14.200 | 14.300 | 14.275 | 13.550 | 56.325 | 111.150 |
| 6 | Joscelyn Roberson | 14.325 | 13.300 | 13.925 | 13.925 | 55.475 | 110.975 |
| 6 | Joscelyn Roberson | 14.500 | 13.025 | 14.050 | 13.925 | 55.500 | 110.975 |
| 7 | Leanne Wong | 14.450 | 13.925 | 13.225 | 13.150 | 54.750 | 110.425 |
| 7 | Leanne Wong | 14.500 | 13.900 | 13.650 | 13.625 | 55.675 | 110.425 |
| 8 | Tiana Sumanasekera | 14.150 | 12.725 | 13.950 | 13.875 | 54.700 | 109.550 |
| 8 | Tiana Sumanasekera | 14.350 | 12.825 | 13.950 | 13.725 | 54.850 | 109.550 |
| 9 | Kaliya Lincoln | 14.225 | 13.450 | 13.050 | 14.150 | 54.875 | 109.400 |
| 9 | Kaliya Lincoln | 14.250 | 13.450 | 13.175 | 13.650 | 54.525 | 109.400 |
| 10 | Simone Rose | 13.450 | 13.450 | 12.225 | 12.550 | 51.675 | 105.200 |
| 10 | Simone Rose | 13.575 | 13.200 | 13.375 | 13.375 | 53.525 | 105.200 |
| 11 | Eveylynn Lowe | 13.525 | 12.900 | 12.475 | 12.775 | 51.675 | 104.500 |
| 11 | Eveylynn Lowe | 13.675 | 12.875 | 13.450 | 12.825 | 52.825 | 104.500 |
| 12 | Zoey Molomo | 13.800 | 10.600 | 13.475 | 13.075 | 50.950 | 103.500 |
| 12 | Zoey Molomo | 13.850 | 12.550 | 13.200 | 12.950 | 52.550 | 103.500 |
| 13 | Dulcy Caylor | 13.300 | 13.450 | 11.575 | 12.225 | 50.550 | 102.575 |
| 13 | Dulcy Caylor | 13.900 | 13.275 | 12.425 | 12.425 | 52.025 | 102.575 |

=== Men ===
| Rank | Gymnast | Floor exercise | Pommel horse | Rings | Vault | Parallel bars | High bar | Day total | Total |
|---|---|---|---|---|---|---|---|---|---|
| 1st place, gold medalist(s) | Fred Richard | 14.700 | 13.450 | 13.800 | 14.200 | 15.050 | 14.400 | 85.600 | 170.500 |
| 1st place, gold medalist(s) | Fred Richard | 14.000 | 13.600 | 13.850 | 14.200 | 14.800 | 14.450 | 84.900 | 170.500 |
| 2nd place, silver medalist(s) | Brody Malone | 13.750 | 13.450 | 14.250 | 14.600 | 14.750 | 14.300 | 85.100 | 170.300 |
| 2nd place, silver medalist(s) | Brody Malone | 14.350 | 13.950 | 14.300 | 14.700 | 14.750 | 13.150 | 85.200 | 170.300 |
| 3rd place, bronze medalist(s) | Shane Wiskus | 14.350 | 13.550 | 13.950 | 14.400 | 14.500 | 13.550 | 84.300 | 169.650 |
| 3rd place, bronze medalist(s) | Shane Wiskus | 14.600 | 13.700 | 14.150 | 14.500 | 14.500 | 13.900 | 85.350 | 169.650 |
| 4 | Paul Juda | 14.600 | 14.050 | 13.800 | 14.200 | 14.050 | 13.450 | 84.150 | 168.850 |
| 4 | Paul Juda | 14.250 | 14.250 | 13.850 | 14.700 | 13.850 | 13.800 | 84.700 | 168.850 |
| 5 | Asher Hong | 14.350 | 12.800 | 14.450 | 14.350 | 14.650 | 13.100 | 83.700 | 167.650 |
| 5 | Asher Hong | 14.150 | 11.750 | 14.700 | 15.250 | 14.900 | 13.200 | 83.950 | 167.650 |
| 6 | Fuzzy Benas | 13.950 | 13.450 | 13.450 | 14.150 | 14.450 | 13.650 | 83.100 | 166.000 |
| 6 | Fuzzy Benas | 14.100 | 13.700 | 13.650 | 13.900 | 13.850 | 13.700 | 82.900 | 166.000 |
| 7 | Donnell Whittenburg | 13.650 | 12.350 | 14.150 | 13.700 | 14.100 | 13.000 | 80.950 | 165.700 |
| 7 | Donnell Whittenburg | 14.850 | 13.050 | 14.600 | 14.900 | 14.200 | 13.150 | 84.750 | 165.700 |
| 8 | Cameron Bock | 14.150 | 14.000 | 13.700 | 14.000 | 14.350 | 13.250 | 83.450 | 165.600 |
| 8 | Cameron Bock | 13.650 | 13.900 | 13.700 | 12.950 | 14.200 | 13.750 | 82.150 | 165.600 |
| 9 | Yul Moldauer | 14.200 | 13.100 | 13.850 | 14.500 | 15.150 | 12.900 | 83.700 | 165.300 |
| 9 | Yul Moldauer | 13.700 | 12.900 | 13.800 | 14.100 | 14.100 | 13.000 | 81.600 | 165.300 |
| 10 | Colt Walker | 12.700 | 13.250 | 13.650 | 14.200 | 14.850 | 11.950 | 80.600 | 163.200 |
| 10 | Colt Walker | 13.850 | 13.900 | 13.700 | 14.200 | 14.800 | 12.150 | 82.600 | 163.200 |
| 11 | Jeremy Bischoff | 13.050 | 13.350 | 13.700 | 13.750 | 12.450 | 13.600 | 79.900 | 160.450 |
| 11 | Jeremy Bischoff | 13.650 | 13.400 | 13.300 | 14.000 | 14.100 | 12.100 | 80.550 | 160.450 |
| 12 | Kai Uemura | 13.050 | 13.250 | 12.850 | 13.550 | 11.750 | 13.200 | 77.650 | 157.200 |
| 12 | Kai Uemura | 12.950 | 13.000 | 12.950 | 13.750 | 13.750 | 13.150 | 79.550 | 157.200 |
| 13 | Kiran Mandava | 12.700 | 12.000 | 12.800 | 13.900 | 13.500 | 11.900 | 76.800 | 156.750 |
| 13 | Kiran Mandava | 13.150 | 13.050 | 12.950 | 13.900 | 13.800 | 13.100 | 79.950 | 156.750 |
| 14 | Tate Costa | 12.250 | 12.650 | 11.450 | 13.400 | 13.200 | 13.150 | 76.100 | 152.750 |
| 14 | Tate Costa | 13.600 | 10.200 | 12.600 | 13.500 | 13.150 | 13.600 | 76.650 | 152.750 |
| 15 | Khoi Young | 13.500 | 11.650 | 13.000 | 14.950 | 14.400 | 12.100 | 79.600 | 151.200 |
| 15 | Khoi Young | 14.450 | 14.250 | – | 15.100 | 14.550 | 13.250 | 71.600 | 151.200 |
| 16 | Curran Phillips | 12.200 | – | – | 14.400 | 15.600 | 12.400 | 54.600 | 111.000 |
| 16 | Curran Phillips | 13.550 | – | – | 13.100 | 15.650 | 14.100 | 56.400 | 111.000 |
| 17 | Joshua Karnes | – | 13.100 | – | – | 14.400 | 13.150 | 40.650 | 81.550 |
| 17 | Joshua Karnes | – | 12.950 | – | – | 14.400 | 13.550 | 40.900 | 81.550 |
| 18 | Patrick Hoopes | – | 14.450 | – | – | – | – | 14.450 | 29.450 |
| 18 | Patrick Hoopes | – | 15.000 | – | – | – | – | 15.000 | 29.450 |
| 19 | Stephen Nedoroscik | – | 14.450 | – | – | – | – | 14.450 | 29.300 |
| 19 | Stephen Nedoroscik | – | 14.850 | – | – | – | – | 14.850 | 29.300 |
| 20 | Alex Diab | – | – | 14.600 | – | – | – | 14.600 | 29.050 |
| 20 | Alex Diab | – | – | 14.450 | – | – | – | 14.450 | 29.050 |

== Olympic team selection ==
=== Women's team ===
The top all-around finisher, Simone Biles, was automatically named to her third olympic team. Suni Lee, Jordan Chiles, and Jade Carey finished second, third, and fourth place, were named to their second Olympic team by the selection committee. Hezly Rivera was the fifth person named to the team by the selection committee after placing fifth in the all-around. Joscelyn Roberson and Leanne Wong were named as traveling alternates for the women's team. Kaliya Lincoln and Tiana Sumanasekera were named as the non-traveling alternates.

=== Men's team ===
The top all-around finisher who recorded top three scores on at least three apparatuses, Fred Richard, was automatically named to the Olympic team. Brody Malone, Paul Juda, and Asher Hong, the second, fourth, and fifth-place finishers, were named to the team by the selection committee. Stephen Nedoroscik, a pommel horse specialist, was the fifth person named to the Olympic Team. Shane Wiskus, the third-place finisher, and Khoi Young were named as the traveling alternates. Donnell Whittenburg, Yul Moldauer, and Patrick Hoopes were named as non-traveling alternates.
