= Dulcy Caylor =

American artistic gymnast

- Caylor at the 2026 U.S. Championships

Personal information
- Full name: Dulcy Grey Caylor
- Born: December 9, 2007 (age 18) North Carolina

Gymnastics career
- Discipline: Women's artistic gymnastics
- Country represented: United States; (2022–present)
- College team: Florida Gators (2027–2030)
- Club: World Champions Centre
- Head coaches: Daymon Jones; Patrick Kiens
- Former coaches: Laurent Landi; Cécile Canqueteau-Landi
Medal record
Women's artistic gymnastics
Representing the United States
World Championships
Silver medal – second place	2026 Rotterdam	Team
Pan American Championships
Gold medal – first place	2025 Panama City	Team
FIG World Cup
Event	1st	2nd	3rd
World Challenge Cup	1	0	0
Total	1	0	0

Dulcy Grey Caylor (born December 9, 2007) is an American artistic gymnast. She was part of the silver medal-winning team at the 2026 World Championships.

== Early life ==
Caylor was born in North Carolina in 2007. In 2018, her family moved to Texas for better gymnastics training and Caylor initially started training at Texas Dreams. In 2022, she began training at World Champions Centre.

== Career ==
=== 2022 ===
Caylor was selected to compete at the 2022 Pan American Championships alongside Zoey Molomo, Tiana Sumanasekera, and Alicia Zhou. There, she helped the USA win team gold and individually won gold in the all-around, silver on vault, and bronze on balance beam. The following month, she competed at the 2022 National Championships, where she won bronze on floor exercise and placed fourth in the all-around, fifth on uneven bars, and eighth on vault.

=== 2023 ===
Caylor made her senior debut at the 2023 Winter Cup, where she placed seventh on uneven bars. In August, she competed at the 2023 U.S. Classic and placed twelfth on floor and sixteenth on uneven bars and balance beam. She then competed at the 2023 National Championships, where she placed sixteenth on floor and 21st on uneven bars and balance beam.

=== 2024 ===
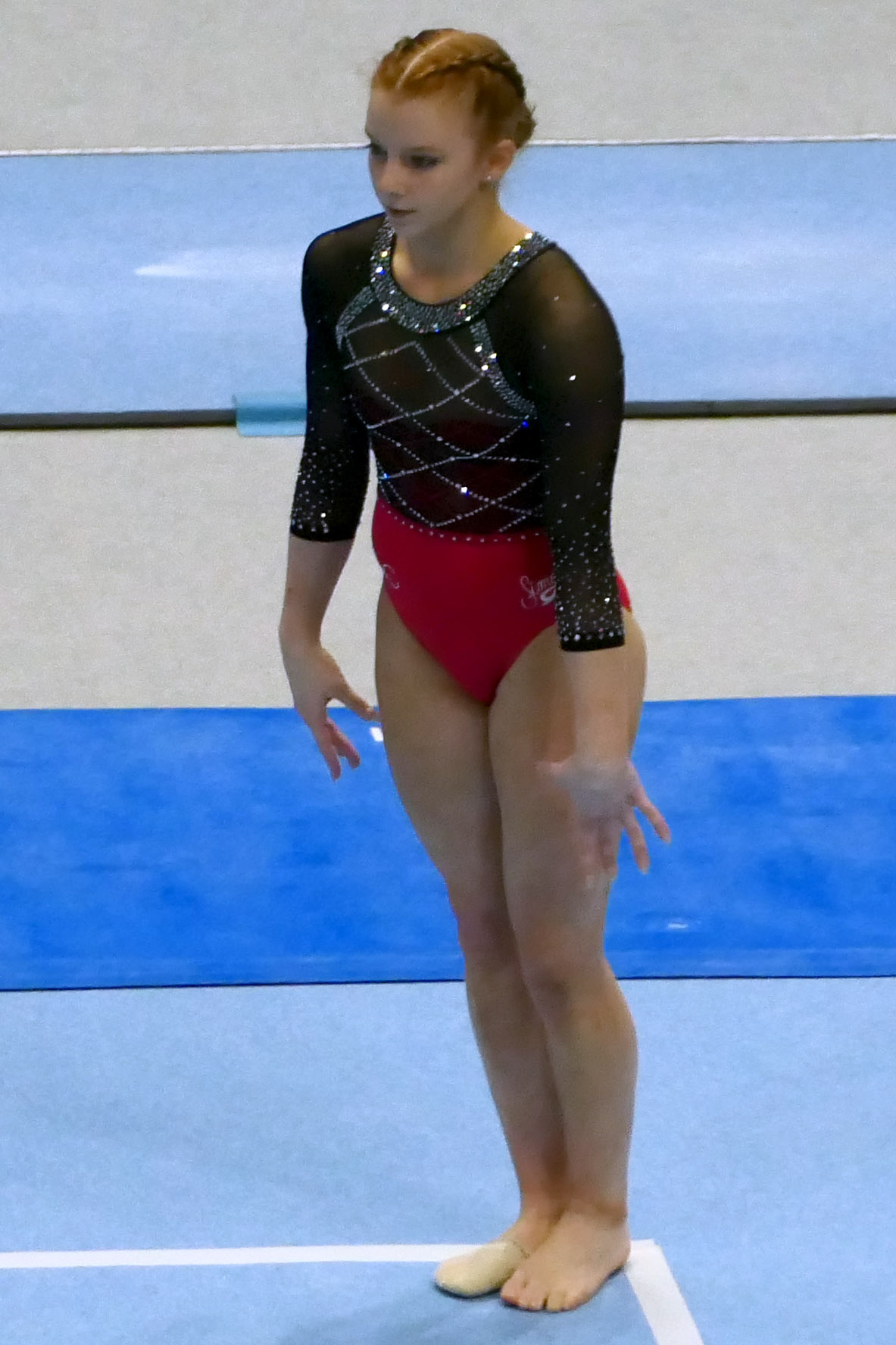
Caylor competing at the 2024 U.S. Classic

In February, Caylor competed at the 2024 Winter Cup and placed fifth in the all-around, seventh on uneven bars and eighth on balance beam. Following the Winter Cup, she was then selected to compete at the DTB Pokal Mixed Cup in Stuttgart, alongside Fuzzy Benas, Riley Loos, Kai Uemura, Addison Fatta, and Nola Matthews. There, she made her senior international debut and helped team USA finish first as a team.

In April, she competed at the 2024 City of Jesolo Trophy and helped team USA finish third as a team behind Italy and Brazil. In May, she competed at the Core Hydration Classic, where she finished eighth in the all-around. She then competed at the National Championships and placed fourteenth in the all-around. As a result, she qualified for the 2024 Olympic Trials. At the Olympic trials, Caylor finished thirteenth in the all-around. After she failed to make the U.S. Olympic team, her parents gifted her tickets to the 2024 Summer Olympics.

In October, she committed to the Florida Gators.

=== 2025 ===
In April she competed at the 2025 City of Jesolo Trophy, where she helped team USA win silver in the team event, and placed sixth in the all-around and on floor. In May, she was selected to compete at the 2025 Pan American Championships alongside Hezly Rivera, Jayla Hang, Gabrielle Hardie, Tiana Sumanasekera, and alternate Alessia Rosa. At the Championships, she helped the United States win gold as a team. At the 2025 National Championships, Caylor placed eighth in the all-around and won bronze on balance beam; as a result, she was added to the national team and invited to partake in the World Championships selection camp.

In late September, Caylor participated in the selection camp for the 2025 World Championships. She won the all-around, which earned her an automatic spot on the team. The following day she was joined by Skye Blakely, Joscelyn Roberson, and Leanne Wong. At the World Championships, she qualified in fifth place for the all-around final with a score of 52.765. She also qualified in sixth place for balance beam, and eighth place on floor exercise finals. She also had the highest single vault score (14.066) among athletes not contending for the apparatus final. During the all-around final Caylor placed thirteenth after falling on both the uneven bars and balance beam. She also placed sixth on floor with a score of 12.966 and eighth on balance beam with a score of 11.800.

On November 12, 2025, she signed with Florida. On November 25, 2025, she announced she was deferring her enrollment at the University of Florida to pursue representing Team USA at the 2028 Summer Olympics in Los Angeles.

=== 2026 ===
In August, she competed at the 2026 National Championships where she placed fifth on balance beam and sixth in the all-around and on floor exercise.

In September, she competed at the Szombathely World Challenge Cup and won gold on floor exercise with a score of 13.466. She also finished fourth on beam with a score of 12.633 and placed sixth in the vault final with a combined score of 12.866. Later that month she participated in the selection camp for the 2026 World Championships and was named as the traveling replacement athlete. On October 17, 2026, her teammate Rivera withdrew from the competition due to injury, as a result Caylor replaced her on the team. At the World Championships, Caylor helped the United States qualify to the team final. During the team final she contributed scores on balance beam and floor exercise towards the United States's second place finish.

== Competitive history ==
Competitive history of Dulcy Caylor
Year	Event	Team	AA	VT	UB	BB	FX
2022
2022	Junior Pan American Championships	1st place, gold medalist(s)	1st place, gold medalist(s)	2nd place, silver medalist(s)		3rd place, bronze medalist(s)	
2022	U.S. National Championships (junior)		4	8	5		3rd place, bronze medalist(s)
2023	Winter Cup				7		
2023	U.S. Classic		11		16	16	12
2023	U.S. National Championships		20		21	21	16
2024	Winter Cup		5		7	8	
2024	DTB Pokal Mixed Cup	1st place, gold medalist(s)					
2024	City of Jesolo Trophy	3rd place, bronze medalist(s)	7		6	8	
2024	U.S. Classic		8		7		
2024	U.S. National Championships		14		15	18	17
2024	Olympic Trials		13		7	13	13
2025	Winter Cup				4	22	
2025	City of Jesolo Trophy	2nd place, silver medalist(s)	6				6
2025	Pan American Championships	1st place, gold medalist(s)					
2025	U.S. Classic		11		5	9	22
2025	U.S. National Championships		8		15	3rd place, bronze medalist(s)	15
2025	World Championships	—N/a	13			8	6
2026	U.S. Classic		15		18	14	16
2026	U.S. National Championships		6		11	5	6
2026	Szombathely World Challenge Cup			6		4	1st place, gold medalist(s)
2026	World Championships	2nd place, silver medalist(s)					
