= 2025 Pan American Artistic Gymnastics Championships =

Gymnastics event in Panama City, Panama

Pan American Gymnastics Championships
- Venue: Atlapa Convention Centre
- Location: Panama City, Panama
- Date: June 12–15, 2025

The 2025 Senior Pan American Gymnastics Championships was an artistic gymnastics competition that took place in Panama City, Panama from June 12–15. The competition was organized by the Panama Gymnastics Federation and approved by the International Gymnastics Federation.

== Participating countries ==
- Argentina
- Aruba
- Brazil
- Canada
- Cayman Islands
- Chile
- Colombia
- Costa Rica
- Cuba
- Dominican Republic
- El Salvador
- Ecuador
- Guatemala
- Haiti
- Honduras
- Jamaica
- Mexico
- Nicaragua
- Panama
- Peru
- Puerto Rico
- Trinidad and Tobago
- United States
- Venezuela

== Medalists ==
Event	Gold	Silver	Bronze
Men
Team all-around	United States; Taylor Burkhart; Taylor Christopulos; Brandon Dang; Asher Hong; Jun Iwai; Joshua Karnes	Canada; Ioannis Chronopoulos; René Cournoyer; Félix Dolci; Aidan Li; Evgeny Siminiuc	Argentina; Santiago Agostinelli; Luca Alfieri; Julián Jato; Santiago Mayol; Daniel Villafañe
Individual all-around	(Canada) Félix Dolci	(United States) Joshua Karnes	(Brazil) Diogo Soares
Floor exercise	(United States) Jun Iwai	(Guatemala) Jorge Vega	(Cuba) Diorges Escobar
Pommel horse	(United States) Brandon Dang	(United States) Joshua Karnes	(Jamaica) Elel Wahrmann-Baker
Rings	(Argentina) Daniel Villafañe	(Puerto Rico) Francisco Vélez	(Puerto Rico) José López
Vault	(Canada) Félix Dolci	(Puerto Rico) José López	(Guatemala) Jorge Vega
Parallel bars	(Canada) Félix Dolci	(Brazil) Diogo Soares	(Canada) Evgeny Siminiuc
Horizontal bar	(Canada) Félix Dolci	(United States) Joshua Karnes	(Canada) Evgeny Siminiuc
Women
Team all-around	United States; Dulcy Caylor; Jayla Hang; Gabrielle Hardie; Hezly Rivera; Tiana Sumanasekera; Alessia Rosa	Canada; Gabrielle Black; Lia Monica Fontaine; Alyssa Guerrier-Calixte; Lia Redick; Evandra Zlobec	Brazil; Luiza Abel; Gabriela Barbosa; Júlia Coutinho; Thaís Fidélis; Rebeca Procópio; Gabriela Bouças
Individual all-around	(United States) Jayla Hang	(Canada) Lia Monica Fontaine	(United States) Hezly Rivera
Vault	(Panama) Karla Navas	(Canada) Lia Monica Fontaine	(United States) Jayla Hang
Uneven bars	(United States) Gabrielle Hardie	(United States) Jayla Hang	(Canada) Lia Monica Fontaine
Balance beam	(Canada) Lia Redick	(United States) Jayla Hang	(United States) Hezly Rivera
Floor exercise	(Canada) Lia Monica Fontaine	(United States) Jayla Hang	(United States) Gabrielle Hardie

== Medal table ==
* Host nation (Panama)

Rank	Nation	Gold	Silver	Bronze	Total
1	United States	6	6	4	16
2	Canada	6	4	3	13
3	Argentina	1	0	1	2
4	Panama*	1	0	0	1
5	Puerto Rico	0	2	1	3
6	Brazil	0	1	2	3
7	Guatemala	0	1	1	2
8	Cuba	0	0	1	1
8	Jamaica	0	0	1	1
Totals (9 entries)		14	14	14	42

== Men's results ==
=== Team ===
Rank	Team	Floor (gymnastics)	Pommel horse	Rings (gymnastics)	Vault (gymnastics)	Parallel bars	Horizontal bar	Total
1st place, gold medalist(s)	United States	40.750	38.300	39.500	42.400	40.200	37.650	238.800
1st place, gold medalist(s)	Asher Hong	13.500		13.950	14.200	13.800	11.200	238.800
1st place, gold medalist(s)	Brandon Dang		14.200					238.800
1st place, gold medalist(s)	Joshua Karnes		11.500			13.400	13.150	238.800
1st place, gold medalist(s)	Jun Iwai	13.800		13.000	14.200	13.000	13.300	238.800
1st place, gold medalist(s)	Taylor Christopulos	13.450	12.600	12.550	14.000			238.800
2nd place, silver medalist(s)	Canada	38.050	37.100	39.100	40.050	39.150	40.050	233.500
2nd place, silver medalist(s)	Aidan Li		11.900					233.500
2nd place, silver medalist(s)	Evgeny Siminiuc	12.700			12.600	13.150	13.100	233.500
2nd place, silver medalist(s)	Félix Dolci			13.250			13.800	233.500
2nd place, silver medalist(s)	Ioannis Chronopoulos	11.700	12.950	13.000	13.400	12.650		233.500
2nd place, silver medalist(s)	René Cournoyer	13.650	12.250	12.850	14.050	13.350	13.150	233.500
3rd place, bronze medalist(s)	Argentina	38.950	37.050	38.100	40.750	37.000	34.150	226.000
3rd place, bronze medalist(s)	Daniel Villafañe	12.600		13.250	13.900			226.000
3rd place, bronze medalist(s)	Julian Jato		11.900			12.500	10.750	226.000
3rd place, bronze medalist(s)	Luca Alfieri		12.350			12.300	12.300	226.000
3rd place, bronze medalist(s)	Santiago Agostinelli	13.000		13.100	13.350			226.000
3rd place, bronze medalist(s)	Santiago Mayol	13.350	12.800	11.750	13.500	12.200	11.100	226.000
4	Brazil	37.600	34.950	36.500	40.500	38.100	36.400	224.050
4	Diogo Soares	13.550	9.900	12.450	13.250	13.700	13.200	224.050
4	Johnny Oshiro		12.550	11.500		12.750		224.050
4	Lucas Bitencourt	12.750				11.650	11.450	224.050
4	Patrick Sampaio	11.300		12.550	13.450		11.750	224.050
4	Vitaliy Guimaraes		12.500		13.800			224.050
5	Colombia	36.300	35.150	35.750	40.850	37.500	37.200	222.750
5	Ángel Barajas	12.750	11.650	12.600	14.000	13.600	13.250	222.750
5	Daniel Villa						11.150	222.750
5	Jordan Castro		11.150	11.600		12.900		222.750
5	Felipe Ramos	11.200			13.350			222.750
5	Yan Zabala	12.350	12.350	11.550	13.500	11.000	12.800	222.750
6	Cuba	38.250	33.800	33.200	39.900	38.650	35.150	218.950
6	Argenis Castañeda	11.750	10.200	9.250	13.600			218.950
6	Alexander Sánchez	12.500		12.700	12.700	12.800		218.950
6	Darian Rodriguez						11.200	218.950
6	Diorges Escobar	14.000	12.400			13.400	12.650	218.950
6	Yohendry Villaverde		11.200	11.250	13.600	12.450	11.300	218.950
7	Puerto Rico	36.250	37.050	36.450	38.600	36.050	34.500	218.900
7	Francisco Vélez			12.600	13.450	11.950		218.900
7	José López	12.600		12.650			12.250	218.900
7	José Rosado	11.700	11.300		12.600	11.800	11.250	218.900
7	Michael Torres	11.950	11.950	11.200	12.550	12.300	11.000	218.900
7	Nelson Guilbe		13.800					218.900
8	Guatemala	38.800	34.100	32.500	41.050	33.800	31.200	211.450
8	Gabriel Paniagua		10.250	10.750		10.050		211.450
8	Jaycko Bourdet	13.000	11.900	10.200	13.450	11.150	10.150	211.450
8	Jorge Vega	13.300			14.250		9.950	211.450
8	Mario Taperio	12.500	11.950	11.550	13.350	12.600	11.100	211.450

=== All-around ===
The gymnasts took part in the individual all-around competition with no prior qualification round. The following is the top 8 of the all-around. Only two gymnasts per country were eligible for placement.

Rank	Gymnast	Floor (gymnastics)	Pommel horse	Rings (gymnastics)	Vault (gymnastics)	Parallel bars	Horizontal bar	Total
1st place, gold medalist(s)	(Canada) Félix Dolci	13.650	11.850	13.000	14.200	13.550	13.900	80.150
2nd place, silver medalist(s)	(United States) Joshua Karnes	13.300	13.250	12.700	13.450	13.650	13.550	79.900
3rd place, bronze medalist(s)	(Brazil) Diogo Soares	13.100	13.100	12.750	13.700	13.450	12.700	78.800
4	(Canada) René Cournoyer	13.250	12.850	12.850	13.300	13.500	12.650	78.400
5	(United States) Taylor Christopulos	13.600	12.900	13.100	13.850	12.850	11.950	78.250
6	(Puerto Rico) José López	13.250	11.450	13.550	13.900	12.850	12.150	77.150
–	(Canada) Ioannis Chronopoulos	12.550	12.200	13.100	12.850	13.150	12.750	76.600
7	(Colombia) Ángel Barajas	11.900	10.600	13.300	13.800	13.950	12.900	76.450

=== Floor exercise ===
Rank	Gymnast	D Score	E Score	Pen.	Bon.	Total
1st place, gold medalist(s)	(United States) Jun Iwai	5.600	8.333	0.000	0.100	14.033
2nd place, silver medalist(s)	(Guatemala) Jorge Vega	5.300	8.400	0.000	0.100	13.800
3rd place, bronze medalist(s)	(Cuba) Diorges Escobar	5.100	8.433	0.000	0.100	13.633
4	(United States) Taylor Christopulos	5.100	8.367	0.100	0.100	13.467
4	(Canada) René Cournoyer	5.100	8.367	0.000	0.000	13.467
6	(Brazil) Diogo Soares	5.200	7.700	0.000	0.000	12.900
7	(Puerto Rico) José López	4.800	7.733	0.000	0.000	12.533
8	(Canada) Félix Dolci	5.200	5.967	0.000	0.100	11.267

=== Pommel horse ===
Rank	Gymnast	D Score	E Score	Pen.	Bon.	Total
1st place, gold medalist(s)	(United States) Brandon Dang	5.500	8.000	0.000	0.000	13.500
2nd place, silver medalist(s)	(United States) Joshua Karnes	5.200	8.067	0.000	0.000	13.267
3rd place, bronze medalist(s)	(Jamaica) Elel Wahrmann-Baker	4.700	7.800	0.000	0.000	12.500
4	(Puerto Rico) Nelson Guilbe	5.000	7.500	0.000	0.000	12.500
5	(Argentina) Santiago Mayol	4.100	7.900	0.000	0.000	12.000
6	(Colombia) Yan Zabala	4.800	6.600	0.000	0.000	11.400
7	(Canada) René Cournoyer	4.000	5.967	0.000	0.000	9.967
8	(Brazil) Diogo Soares	4.100	3.833	0.000	0.000	7.933

=== Rings ===
Rank	Gymnast	D Score	E Score	Pen.	Bon.	Total
1st place, gold medalist(s)	(Argentina) Daniel Villafañe	5.000	8.600	0.000	0.100	13.700
2nd place, silver medalist(s)	(Puerto Rico) Francisco Vélez	5.100	8.333	0.000	0.000	13.433
3rd place, bronze medalist(s)	(Puerto Rico) José López	5.100	8.133	0.000	0.000	13.233
4	(Canada) Félix Dolci	5.200	8.033	0.000	0.000	13.233
5	(Canada) Ioannis Chronopoulos	4.900	8.233	0.000	0.000	13.133
6	(United States) Taylor Christopulos	4.400	8.633	0.000	0.000	13.033
7	(Colombia) Ángel Barajas	4.400	8.200	0.000	0.100	12.700
8	(Mexico) Ricardo Torres	4.500	7.667	0.000	0.000	12.167

=== Vault ===
Rank	Gymnast	Vault 1					Vault 2					Total
Rank	Gymnast	D Score	E Score	Pen.	Bon.	Score 1	D Score	E Score	Pen.	Bon.	Score 2	Total
1st place, gold medalist(s)	(Canada) Félix Dolci	5.200	9.000	0.100	0.000	14.100	5.200	8.833	0.000	0.000	14.033	14.066
2nd place, silver medalist(s)	(Puerto Rico) José López	4.800	9.233	0.000	0.000	14.033	4.800	8.867	0.000	0.000	13.667	13.850
3rd place, bronze medalist(s)	(Guatemala) Jorge Vega	4.800	9.367	0.000	0.000	14.267	4.800	7.900	0.000	0.000	12.700	13.483
4	(Cuba) Yohendry Villaverde	4.800	9.033	0.000	0.000	13.833	4.800	7.733	0.000	0.000	12.533	13.183
5	(Ecuador) Daniel Chica	4.800	8.200	0.000	0.000	13.000	4.400	8.767	0.000	0.000	13.167	13.084
6	(Dominican Republic) Wilfry Contreras	5.200	7.667	0.100	0.000	12.767	4.400	9.067	0.100	0.000	13.367	13.067
7	(Brazil) Patrick Sampaio	3.600	8.833	0.000	0.000	12.433	4.400	9.067	0.000	0.000	13.467	12.950
8	(Jamaica) Clayton Bell	4.400	7.800	0.300	0.000	11.900	4.400	7.867	0.300	0.000	11.967	11.932

=== Parallel bars ===
Rank	Gymnast	D Score	E Score	Pen.	Bon.	Total
1st place, gold medalist(s)	(Canada) Félix Dolci	5.300	8.400	0.000	0.100	13.800
2nd place, silver medalist(s)	(Brazil) Diogo Soares	5.300	8.467	0.000	0.000	13.767
3rd place, bronze medalist(s)	(Canada) Evgeny Siminiuc	5.000	8.533	0.000	0.000	13.533
4	(Cuba) Diorges Escobar	4.900	8.500	0.000	0.100	13.500
5	(United States) Joshua Karnes	5.300	8.167	0.000	0.000	13.467
6	(Cuba) Alexander Sánchez	4.900	8.267	0.000	0.000	13.167
7	(Colombia) Ángel Barajas	6.100	6.767	0.000	0.000	12.867
8	(United States) Jun Iwai	4.700	7.400	0.000	0.100	12.200

=== Horizontal bar ===
Rank	Gymnast	D Score	E Score	Pen.	Bon.	Total
1st place, gold medalist(s)	(Canada) Félix Dolci	5.800	8.133	0.000	0.000	13.933
2nd place, silver medalist(s)	(United States) Joshua Karnes	5.500	8.000	0.000	0.000	13.500
3rd place, bronze medalist(s)	(Canada) Evgeny Siminiuc	4.700	8.567	0.000	0.100	13.367
4	(United States) Jun Iwai	5.200	7.767	0.000	0.000	12.967
5	(Colombia) Ángel Barajas	5.800	6.433	0.000	0.100	12.333
6	(Cuba) Diorges Escobar	4.600	6.967	0.000	0.000	11.567
7	(Colombia) Yan Zabala	5.000	6.433	0.000	0.100	11.533
8	(Brazil) Lucas Bitencourt	4.000	7.267	0.000	0.000	11.267

== Women's results ==
=== Team ===
Rank	Team	Vault (gymnastics)	Uneven bars	Balance beam	Floor (gymnastics)	Total
1st place, gold medalist(s)	United States	42.099	41.399	40.567	40.700	164.765
1st place, gold medalist(s)	Dulcy Caylor	14.033				164.765
1st place, gold medalist(s)	Gabrielle Hardie		13.433		13.500	164.765
1st place, gold medalist(s)	Hezly Rivera	13.833	13.833	13.633	13.467	164.765
1st place, gold medalist(s)	Jayla Hang	14.233	14.133	13.567	13.733	164.765
1st place, gold medalist(s)	Tiana Sumanasekera			13.367		164.765
2nd place, silver medalist(s)	Canada	40.800	37.267	35.966	37.600	151.633
2nd place, silver medalist(s)	Alyssa Guerrier-Calixte			12.833	12.933	151.633
2nd place, silver medalist(s)	Evandra Zlobec				12.400	151.633
2nd place, silver medalist(s)	Gabrielle Black	13.700	12.600		12.267	151.633
2nd place, silver medalist(s)	Lia Redick	13.467	11.667	11.300		151.633
2nd place, silver medalist(s)	Lia-Monica Fontaine	13.633	13.000	11.833		151.633
3rd place, bronze medalist(s)	Brazil	39.866	36.033	39.300	36.267	151.466
3rd place, bronze medalist(s)	Gabriela Barbosa		11.933	12.933	12.700	151.466
3rd place, bronze medalist(s)	Julia Coutinho		12.200		12.300	151.466
3rd place, bronze medalist(s)	Luiza Abel	13.300				151.466
3rd place, bronze medalist(s)	Rebeca Procópio	13.133		12.767		151.466
3rd place, bronze medalist(s)	Thaís Fidélis	13.433	11.900	13.600	11.267	151.466
4	Argentina	39.033	37.766	35.900	38.367	151.066
4	Dolores Carregal	12.967			12.667	151.066
4	Emilia Acosta	12.933		12.933	13.000	151.066
4	Isabella Ajalla	13.133	12.400	12.767	12.700	151.066
4	Meline Mesropian		12.533	10.200		151.066
4	Sira Macias		12.833			151.066
5	Panama	41.567	34.934	34.701	36.333	147.535
5	Alyiah Lide de León	13.267		12.067	12.433	147.535
5	Ana Gutiérrez		11.267			147.535
5	Hillary Heron	13.700	11.700	12.267		147.535
5	Karla Navas	14.600	11.967		12.500	147.535
5	Tatiana Tapia			10.367	11.400	147.535
6	Mexico	39.867	34.400	35.533	37.734	147.534
6	Cinthia Ruíz		11.700			147.534
6	Julieta Bizarrón	13.200	10.400			147.534
6	Mariangela Flores			11.533	12.467	147.534
6	Paulina Guerra	13.567	12.300	11.800	12.567	147.534
6	Valentina Meléndez	13.100		12.200	12.700	147.534
7	Colombia	37.533	34.467	34.599	35.300	141.899
7	Daira Lamadrid		12.500	11.433		141.899
7	Jireth González	11.633	11.300		11.067	141.899
7	Juliana Ochoa	13.033		11.933	12.133	141.899
8	Ecuador	37.600	34.034	34.367	34.700	140.701
8	Alais Perea	12.433	11.500	12.067	10.833	140.701
8	Ashley Bohórquez	13.700	11.767	10.767	12.100	140.701
8	Fabiana Sadún		10.767	11.533	11.767	140.701
8	Melina Tripul	11.467				140.701

=== All-around ===
The gymnasts took part in the individual all-around competition with no prior qualification round. The following is the top 8 of the all-around. Only two gymnasts per country were eligible for placement.

Rank	Gymnast	Vault (gymnastics)	Uneven bars	Balance beam	Floor (gymnastics)	Total
1st place, gold medalist(s)	(United States) Jayla Hang	13.933	13.867	13.733	13.767	55.300
2nd place, silver medalist(s)	(Canada) Lia Monica Fontaine	14.033	13.433	13.100	13.400	53.966
3rd place, bronze medalist(s)	(United States) Hezly Rivera	13.800	11.400	13.900	13.567	52.667
–	(United States) Dulcy Caylor	14.267	12.100	13.433	12.800	52.600
4	(Canada) Gabrielle Black	13.933	12.833	11.900	12.767	51.433
–	(Canada) Alyssa Guerrier-Calixte	13.333	11.700	12.367	12.700	50.100
5	(Argentina) Emilia Acosta	13.333	12.167	11.933	12.533	49.966
6	(Argentina) Isabella Ajalla	13.267	12.667	11.000	12.733	49.667

=== Vault ===
Rank	Gymnast	Vault 1				Vault 2				Bonus	Total
Rank	Gymnast	D Score	E Score	Pen.	Score 1	D Score	E Score	Pen.	Score 2	Bonus	Total
1st place, gold medalist(s)	(Panama) Karla Navas	5.2	9.100		14.300	4.6	9.367		13.967	0.2	14.334
2nd place, silver medalist(s)	(Canada) Lia Monica Fontaine	5.0	9.133		14.133	4.8	9.067		13.867	0.2	14.200
3rd place, bronze medalist(s)	(United States) Jayla Hang	5.0	9.133		14.133	4.2	8.967		13.167	0.2	13.850
4	(Jamaica) Raeya Linton	4.2	9.367		13.567	4.4	9.100		13.500		13.534
5	(Canada) Gabrielle Black	4.6	9.000		13.600	4.4	8.833		13.233		13.416
6	(Argentina) Emilia Acosta	4.4	8.833		13.233	4.6	8.667		13.267		13.250
7	(Ecuador) Ashley Bohórquez	4.6	7.733	0.300	12.033	4.4	8.467		12.867		12.450
8	(Mexico) Valentina Meléndez	4.4	8.600		13.000	4.0	7.700		11.700		12.350

=== Uneven bars ===
Rank	Gymnast	D Score	E Score	Pen.	Total
1st place, gold medalist(s)	(United States) Gabrielle Hardie	5.4	8.200		13.600
2nd place, silver medalist(s)	(United States) Jayla Hang	5.8	7.733		13.533
3rd place, bronze medalist(s)	(Canada) Lia Monica Fontaine	5.6	7.567		13.167
4	(Canada) Gabrielle Black	4.7	8.067		12.767
5	(Argentina) Isabella Ajalla	4.8	7.667		12.467
6	(Argentina) Meline Mesropian	5.7	6.600		12.300
7	(Panama) Ana Gutiérrez	5.1	6.367		11.467
8	(Mexico) Paulina Guerra	4.9	6.267		11.167

=== Balance beam ===
Rank	Gymnast	D Score	E Score	Pen.	Total
1st place, gold medalist(s)	(Canada) Lia Redick	5.3	7.967		13.267
2nd place, silver medalist(s)	(United States) Jayla Hang	5.6	7.633		13.233
3rd place, bronze medalist(s)	(United States) Hezly Rivera	5.6	7.400		13.000
4	(Brazil) Rebeca Procópio	4.9	7.867		12.767
5	(Panama) Alyiah Lide de León	4.8	7.600		12.400
6	(Argentina) Meline Mesropian	5.5	6.433		11.933
7	(Canada) Lia Monica Fontaine	5.0	6.833		11.833
8	(Panama) Hillary Heron	4.6	5.000		9.600

=== Floor exercise ===
Rank	Gymnast	D Score	E Score	Pen.	Total
1st place, gold medalist(s)	(Canada) Lia Monica Fontaine	5.8	8.000		13.800
2nd place, silver medalist(s)	(United States) Jayla Hang	5.4	8.033		13.433
3rd place, bronze medalist(s)	(United States) Gabrielle Hardie	5.2	8.033	0.1	13.133
4	(Panama) Karla Navas	4.9	7.833		12.733
5	(Canada) Evandra Zlobec	4.7	7.900		12.600
6	(Argentina) Dolores Carregal	5.2	7.100		12.300
7	(Panama) Alyiah Lide de León	4.9	7.300	0.3	11.900
8	(Argentina) Isabella Ajalla	4.8	6.933		11.733
