= Jayla Hang =

American artistic gymnast

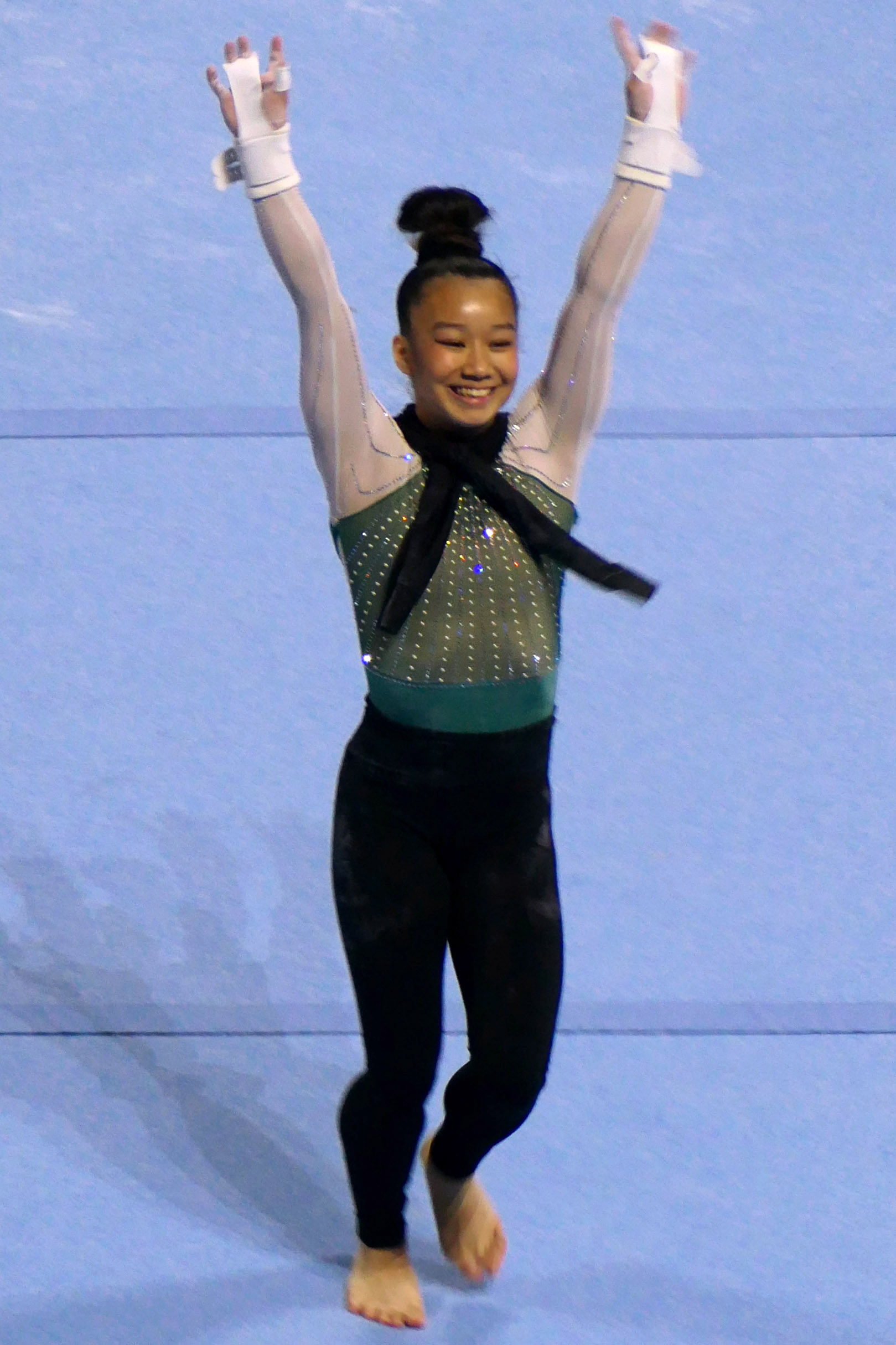
- Hang at the 2024 U.S. Classic

Personal information
- Full name: Jayla Thuy Hang
- Nickname: Jay
- Born: January 9, 2008 (age 18) Renton, Washington, U.S.

Gymnastics career
- Country represented: United States; (2022–present)
- College team: Florida Gators (2028–31)
- Club: Pacific Reign Gymnastics
- Head coach: Cale Robinson
- Assistant coach: Stephanie Gentry
Medal record
Women's artistic gymnastics
Representing United States
Pan American Championships
Gold medal – first place	2025 Panama City	Team
Gold medal – first place	2025 Panama City	All-around
Silver medal – second place	2025 Panama City	Uneven bars
Silver medal – second place	2025 Panama City	Balance beam
Silver medal – second place	2025 Panama City	Floor exercise
Bronze medal – third place	2025 Panama City	Vault
Pacific Rim Championships
Gold medal – first place	2024 Cali	Team
Gold medal – first place	2024 Cali	All-around
Silver medal – second place	2024 Cali	Floor exercise
Bronze medal – third place	2024 Cali	Uneven bars
Bronze medal – third place	2024 Cali	Balance beam
Junior World Championships
Silver medal – second place	2023 Antalya	Team
FIG World Cup
Event / 1st / 2nd / 3rd; Apparatus World Cup / 2 / 1 / 1

Jayla Thuy Hang (born January 9, 2008) is an American artistic gymnast. She is the 2024 Pacific Rim Gymnastics Championships and 2025 Pan American Championships all-around champion.

== Junior gymnastics career ==
=== 2022 ===
Hang competed at the 2022 Winter Cup where she won bronze on the uneven bars.

In July she competed at the U.S. Classic where she won gold in the all-around, and on vault, bronze on floor exercise, and finished fourth on uneven bars and balance beam. The following month she competed at the National Championships where she won gold on vault and balance beam, silver in the all-around, and bronze on uneven bars.

=== 2023 ===
Hang competed at the 2023 Winter Cup where she won gold on vault and uneven bars, silver in the all-around and bronze on floor exercise. As a result, she was named to the team to compete at the 2023 Junior World Championships.

On the first day of the Junior World Championships, Hang helped the USA finish second behind Japan. She qualified for the vault and floor exercise finals. During the event finals she placed fifth on floor exercise, sixth on vault, and finished fourth in the all-around.

She was named to the roster for the 2023 National Championships, however, she had to withdraw from the competition after three events.

== Senior gymnastics career ==
=== 2024 ===
In February, Hang made her senior national team debut at the 2024 Winter Cup. During the event she placed fourth on balance beam and ninth in the all-around. In April, she made her senior international debut at the 2024 Pacific Rim Gymnastics Championships. During the event she won gold in the team event and all-around, silver on floor exercise, and bronze on uneven bars and balance beam.

=== 2025 ===
Hang competed at the 2025 Winter Cup where she won silver in the all-around and on vault and floor exercise. She competed at the Antalaya World Cup where she qualified to all four apparatus event finals. She won gold on vault, placed fourth on balance beam, and sixth on uneven bars and floor exercise. She then competed at the Osijek World Cup where she won gold on floor, silver on beam, bronze on vault and placed eighth on bars.

In May she was selected to compete at the 2025 Pan American Championships alongside Dulcy Caylor, Hezly Rivera, Gabrielle Hardie, Tiana Sumanasekera, and alternate Alessia Rosa. On the first day of competition, she won gold in the all-around with a score of 55.300 points, and qualified to all four individual apparatus finals. During the team final, she contributed scores on all four apparatuses towards the United States' first place finish. During the event finals, she won a medal on every apparatus, including silver on uneven bars, balance beam, and floor exercise, and bronze on vault.

At the 2025 National Championships Hang faltered on the first day of competition but rallied on the second day to finish sixth in the all-around and third on balance beam behind Rivera and Skye Blakely and tied with Caylor. As a result she was added to the national team and invited to partake in the World Championships selection camp. At the conclusion of the selection camp Hang was named as a non-traveling alternate for the 2025 World Championships.

On November 12, 2025, she signed with Florida. On July 17, 2026, she announced she would defer enrollment to Florida to train for the 2028 Summer Olympics.

== Competitive history ==
Competitive history of Jayla Hang at the junior level
Year	Event	Team	AA	VT	UB	BB	FX
2022	Winter Cup		9	7	3rd place, bronze medalist(s)	7	
2022	U.S. Classic		1st place, gold medalist(s)	1st place, gold medalist(s)	4	4	3rd place, bronze medalist(s)
2022	U.S. National Championships		2nd place, silver medalist(s)	1st place, gold medalist(s)	3rd place, bronze medalist(s)	1st place, gold medalist(s)	
2023	Winter Cup		2nd place, silver medalist(s)	1st place, gold medalist(s)	1st place, gold medalist(s)		3rd place, bronze medalist(s)
2023	Junior World Championships	2nd place, silver medalist(s)	4	6			5

Competitive history of Jayla Hang at the senior level
Year	Event	Team	AA	VT	UB	BB	FX
2024	Winter Cup		9			4	
2024	Pacific Rim Championships	1st place, gold medalist(s)	1st place, gold medalist(s)		3rd place, bronze medalist(s)	3rd place, bronze medalist(s)	2nd place, silver medalist(s)
2024	U.S. Classic		22		41	5	32
2024	U.S. National Championships		16		23	18	20
2025	Winter Cup		2nd place, silver medalist(s)	2nd place, silver medalist(s)	6	11	2nd place, silver medalist(s)
2025	Antalya World Cup			1st place, gold medalist(s)	6	4	6
2025	Osijek World Cup			3rd place, bronze medalist(s)	8	2nd place, silver medalist(s)	1st place, gold medalist(s)
2025	Pan American Championships	1st place, gold medalist(s)	1st place, gold medalist(s)	3rd place, bronze medalist(s)	2nd place, silver medalist(s)	2nd place, silver medalist(s)	2nd place, silver medalist(s)
2025	U.S. Classic				17	5	
2025	U.S. National Championships		6		13	3rd place, bronze medalist(s)	12
