= Taylor Christopulos =

American gymnast (born 2001)

- Born: August 24, 2001 (age 25) Layton, Utah, U.S.

Gymnastics career
- Discipline: Men's artistic gymnastics
- Country represented: United States; (2023–2025)
- College team: Nebraska Cornhuskers
- Head coach: Chuck Chmelka
- Awards: Nissen-Emery Award (2025)
Medal record
Men's artistic gymnastics
Representing the United States
Pan American Championships
Gold medal – first place	2023 Medellín	Team
Gold medal – first place	2025 Panama City	Team

Taylor Troy Christopulos (born August 24, 2001) is an American artistic gymnast. He is a member of the United States men's national artistic gymnastics team.

== Early life and education ==
Christopulos attended Layton High School in Layton, Utah, before enrolling at the University of Nebraska–Lincoln to pursue gymnastics. He majored in agribusiness.

== Gymnastics career ==
=== 2021–2022 ===
Christopulos began competing for the Nebraska Cornhuskers men's gymnastics team in 2021. During the season, he was named CGA National Rookie of the Week four times, Big Ten Freshman of the Week three times, and Big Ten Freshman of the Year.

=== 2023–2024 ===
During the 2023 NCAA season, he won 13 individual titles, including five on vault, four on floor, three all-around titles, and one parallel bars title. At the 2023 Big Ten Championships, he won a gold medal on vault and earned first-team All-Big Ten honors. During the 2023 NCAA men's gymnastics championship, he won a silver medal in the all-around. Following the season, he was named Big Ten Gymnast of the Year.

In May 2023, he represented the United States at the 2023 Pan American Championships alongside Yul Moldauer, Shane Wiskus, Curran Phillips, and Khoi Young. He helped the USA win its second consecutive team title.

In August 2023, he competed at the World University Games where he helped the USA finish fourth as a team. Individually, he finished eighth in the horizontal bar final.

During the 2024 NCAA men's gymnastics championship, he won silver on floor exercise, bronze on high bar, and placed fourth on vault and sixth in the all-around.

=== 2025 ===
In February 2025, Christopulos competed at the 2025 Winter Cup and won bronze in the all-around with a score of 158.400. The next month he competed at the 2025 DTB Pokal Team Challenge and helped the USA win silver as a team.

During the 2025 NCAA season, he claimed four individual event titles - two on the high bar and one each on the pommel horse and floor exercise. Following the season, he was named Big Ten Gymnast of the Year for the second time in his career, becoming the first Husker in school history to win the award twice. On April 17, 2025, he was named the Nissen-Emery Award winner. During his career at Nebraska, he won 27 individual titles and was an eight-time All-American.

Christopulos was selected to represent the United States at the Pan American Championships alongside Asher Hong, Taylor Burkhart, Brandon Dang, Joshua Karnes, and alternate Jun Iwai. While there he helped the United States win gold as a team. Individually, he placed fourth on floor exercise and sixth on rings.

== Personal life ==
Christopulos was born to Troy and Jennifer Christopulos. He has four siblings, Tony, Tess, Tia, and Tana. He married Kayzha Madsen in August 2024.

== Competitive history ==
Year	Event	Team	AA	FX	PH	SR	VT	PB	HB
Junior
2018	U.S. National Championships						4		5
2019	U.S. National Championships					6			
Senior
2021	NCAA Championships	4					5		
2022	NCAA Championships	4							
2022	U.S. Classic								8
2023	Winter Cup			5	6				
2023	NCAA Championships	5	2nd place, silver medalist(s)					7	
2023	Pan American Championships	1st place, gold medalist(s)							
2023	World University Games	4							8
2024	Winter Cup		8	17	10	14		14	18
2024	NCAA Championships	4	6	2nd place, silver medalist(s)			4		3rd place, bronze medalist(s)
2025	Winter Cup		3rd place, bronze medalist(s)	13	6	5		13	10
2025	DTB Pokal Team Challenge	2nd place, silver medalist(s)							
2025	NCAA Championships	4	5		8				
2025	Pan American Championships	1st place, gold medalist(s)	5	4		6			
2025	U.S. National Championships		17	26	12	27		22	12
2026	Winter Cup		6	22	12	19		11	16

== Awards and honors ==
Year	Award
2021	Big Ten Freshman of the Year
2023	Big Ten Gymnast of the Year
2025	Big Ten Gymnast of the Year
2025	Nissen-Emery Award
