= Khoi Young =

American gymnast (born 2002)

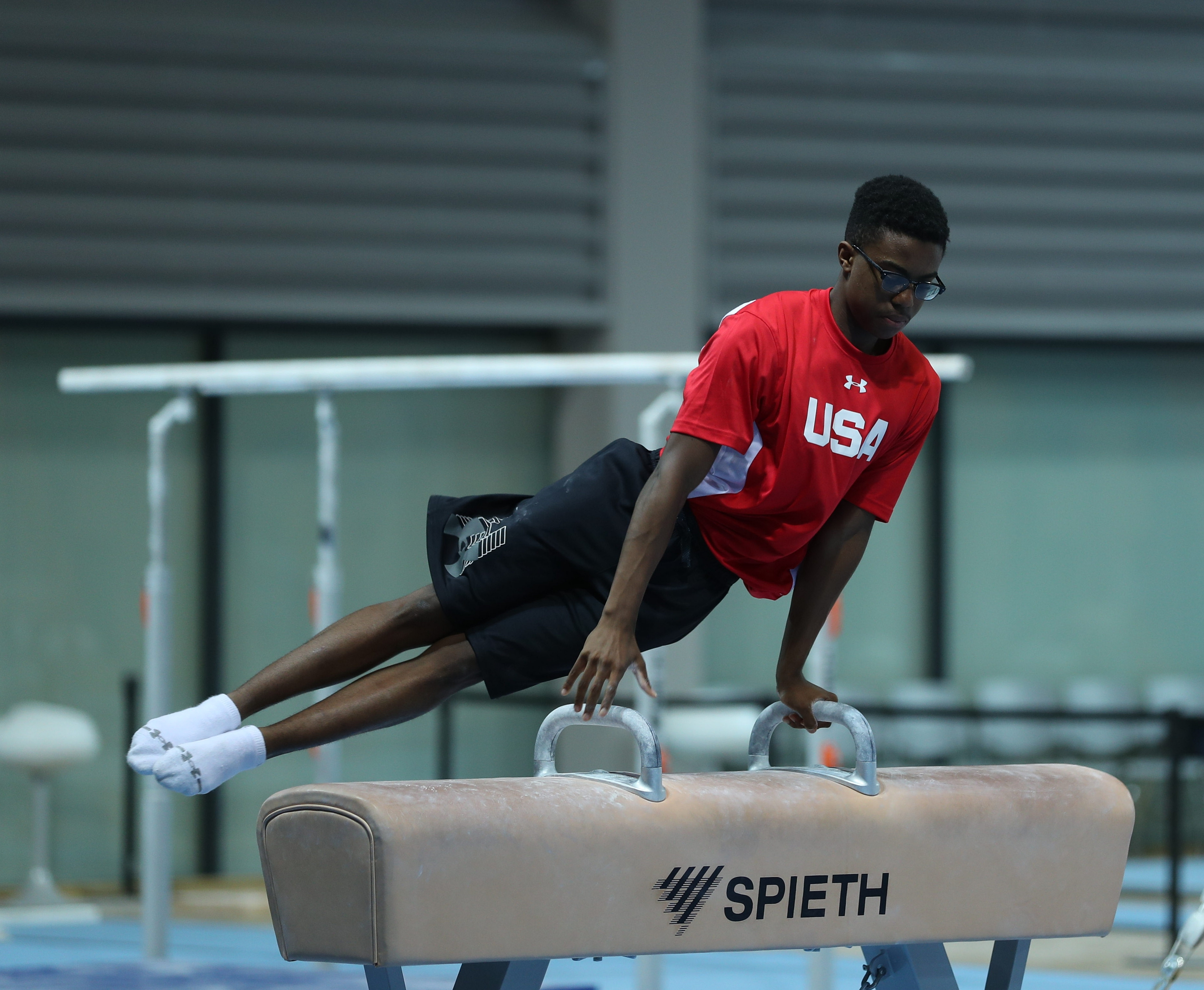
- Young at the 2019 Junior World Championships

Personal information
- Full name: Khoi Alexander Young
- Born: December 31, 2002 (age 23) Bowie, Maryland, U.S.
- Height: 5 ft 4 in (163 cm)

Gymnastics career
- Discipline: Men's artistic gymnastics
- Country represented: United States; (2022–2025)
- College team: Stanford Cardinal
- Gym: Sportsplex Gymnastics
- Head coach: Thom Glielmi
Medal record
Men's artistic gymnastics
Representing United States
| Event | 1st | 2nd | 3rd |
|---|---|---|---|
| World Championships | 0 | 2 | 1 |
| Pan American Championships | 2 | 0 | 0 |
| Total | 2 | 2 | 1 |
World Championships
| Silver medal – second place | 2023 Antwerp | Pommel horse |
| Silver medal – second place | 2023 Antwerp | Vault |
| Bronze medal – third place | 2023 Antwerp | Team |
Pan American Championships
| Gold medal – first place | 2023 Rio de Janeiro | Team |
| Gold medal – first place | 2023 Rio de Janeiro | Pommel horse |

Khoi Alexander Young (born December 31, 2002) is an American artistic gymnast. He has been a member of the United States men's national artistic gymnastics team since 2022 and was a member of the bronze medal-winning team at the 2023 World Championships. He competes in collegiate gymnastics for Stanford. He is the 2023 Pan American champion on the pommel horse. In June 2024, he was named an alternate to the U.S. men's team for the 2024 Summer Olympics.

== Early life and education ==
Young was born in Bowie, Maryland, on December 31, 2002, to Kevin and Lucille Young. He has two siblings.

He attended Bowie High School before enrolling at Stanford University to pursue gymnastics.

== Gymnastics career ==
=== 2019 ===
Young competed at the 2019 Winter Cup where he placed 7th in the all-around but won gold on floor exercise and silver on vault. In May, Young was selected at the alternate for the inaugural Junior World Championships.

In August, Young competed at the U.S. National Championships in the 15-16 age division and finished 5th in the all-around. He won gold on pommel horse, silver on floor exercise, and bronze on parallel bars.

=== 2020–2021 ===
In early 2020, Young competed at the RD761 Gymnastics Invitational and helped Team USA win silver behind Japan. Individually, Young won silver in the all-around behind Motomu Yoshida and picked up three additional medals during event finals. He next competed at the Winter Cup and placed 18th in the all-around. The remainder of the competitive season was canceled due to the global COVID-19 pandemic.

Young returned to competition at the 2021 Winter Cup and placed third on vault and fifth on pommel horse. At the 2021 National Championships, Young placed 22nd in the all-around.

=== 2022 ===
Young began competing for the Stanford Cardinal in the 2021–2022 season. He competed at the 2022 Winter Cup where he placed second in the all-around behind Vitaliy Guimaraes. During event finals he won gold on pommel horse and silver on vault behind Asher Hong. As a result, Young was selected to represent the USA at the DTB Pokal Team Challenge in Stuttgart alongside Guimaraes, Hong, Brody Malone, and Yul Moldauer. At the NCAA Championship Young helped Stanford defend their national title. Additionally he placed second on vault behind Paul Juda.

In late July, Young competed at the U.S. Classic where he placed fourth in the all-around.

=== 2023 ===
Young was selected to represent the United States at the Pan American Championships alongside Yul Moldauer, Curran Phillips, Shane Wiskus, and Taylor Christopulos. Young helped the USA qualify for the team final on the first day of competition. Individually, he won gold on pommel horse. On the final day of competition Young helped the USA win their second consecutive team title. In August Young competed at the Core Hydration Classic. He won silver in the all-around and on pommel horse and vault and placed third on floor exercise.

Young later competed at the Xfinity National Championships where he placed second in the all-around behind Asher Hong. The following day he was named to the team to compete at the upcoming World Championships alongside Hong, Fred Richard, Yul Moldauer, Paul Juda, and alternate Colt Walker.

At the World Championships, Young helped the USA qualify for the team final in second place. Individually, he qualified for the pommel horse and vault finals. During the team final, he contributed scores on pommel horse, vault, and horizontal bar toward the USA's third-place finish. In doing so, he helped the USA win their first team medal in nine years. During event finals Young won silver on both pommel horse (behind Rhys McClenaghan) and vault (behind Jake Jarman). In doing so Young became the first American male since Paul Hamm in 2003 to win three medals at a single world championship and the first American male since Kurt Thomas and Bart Conner in 1979 to win multiple individual apparatus medals at a single world championship.

=== 2024 ===
Young competed at the NCAA Championships in mid-April, where he helped Stanford win their fifth consecutive team title. Individually Young won the all-around ahead of Fred Richard and Fuzzy Benas. At the 2024 National Championships Young finished third in the all-around behind Brody Malone and Richard.

In June, Young competed at the U.S. Olympic Trials, where he placed 15th in the all-around (151.200), 8th on floor (27.950), 14th on pommel horse (25.900), 16th on rings (13.000), 8th on parallel bars (28.950), and 15th on horizontal bar (25.350). On June 29, he was named as an alternate to the U.S. Olympic Team for the 2024 Summer Olympics.

== Competitive history ==
Competitive history of Khoi Young
| Year | Event | Team | AA | FX | PH | SR | VT | PB | HB |
|---|---|---|---|---|---|---|---|---|---|
| 2019 | Winter Cup | | 7 | 1st place, gold medalist(s) | 4 | 13 | 2nd place, silver medalist(s) | 10 | 12 |
| 2019 | Elite Team Cup | 5 | | | | | | | |
| 2019 | Junior World Championships | 7 (Note: Young was the team USA alternate) | | | | | | | |
| 2019 | U.S. National Championships (15-16) | | 5 | 2nd place, silver medalist(s) | 1st place, gold medalist(s) | 11 | 6 | 3rd place, bronze medalist(s) | 8 |
| 2020 | RD761 Gymnastics Invitational | 2nd place, silver medalist(s) | 2nd place, silver medalist(s) | 2nd place, silver medalist(s) | 2nd place, silver medalist(s) | | 3rd place, bronze medalist(s) | | |
| 2020 | Winter Cup | | 18 | | | | | | |
| 2021 | Winter Cup | | | 17 | 5 | | 3rd place, bronze medalist(s) | | |
| 2021 | U.S. National Championships | | 22 | 21 | 7 | 23 | 10 | 24 | 23 |
| 2022 | Winter Cup | | 2nd place, silver medalist(s) | 8 | 1st place, gold medalist(s) | 18 | 2nd place, silver medalist(s) | 11 | 6 |
| 2022 | DTB Pokal Team Challenge | 1st place, gold medalist(s) | | | 1st place, gold medalist(s) | | 1st place, gold medalist(s) | | |
| 2022 | MPSF Championships | 1st place, gold medalist(s) | | 17 | 1st place, gold medalist(s) | | 4 | | |
| 2022 | NCAA Championships | 1st place, gold medalist(s) | | | 4 | | 2nd place, silver medalist(s) | | |
| 2022 | U.S. Classic | | 4 | 7 | 6 | 8 | 8 | 7 | 7 |
| 2023 | Winter Cup | | | | 12 | | | | |
| 2023 | MPSF Championships | 1st place, gold medalist(s) | | | 1st place, gold medalist(s) | | | | |
| 2023 | NCAA Championships | 1st place, gold medalist(s) | | | 10 | | 6 | | |
| 2023 | Pan American Championships | 1st place, gold medalist(s) | | | 1st place, gold medalist(s) | | | | |
| 2023 | U.S. Classic | | 2nd place, silver medalist(s) | 3rd place, bronze medalist(s) | 2nd place, silver medalist(s) | 16 | 2nd place, silver medalist(s) | 44 | 31 |
| 2023 | U.S. National Championships | | 2nd place, silver medalist(s) | 5 | 2nd place, silver medalist(s) | 19 | | 11 | 9 |
| 2023 | World Championships | 3rd place, bronze medalist(s) | | | 2nd place, silver medalist(s) | | 2nd place, silver medalist(s) | | |
| 2024 | Cottbus World Cup | | | | | | | 6 | |
| 2024 | MPSF Championships | 1st place, gold medalist(s) | 1st place, gold medalist(s) | 3rd place, bronze medalist(s) | 2nd place, silver medalist(s) | 11 | 1st place, gold medalist(s) | 1st place, gold medalist(s) | 6 |
| 2024 | NCAA Championships | 1st place, gold medalist(s) | 1st place, gold medalist(s) | 10 | 2nd place, silver medalist(s) | 29 | 3rd place, bronze medalist(s) | 2nd place, silver medalist(s) | 14 |
| 2024 | U.S. National Championships | | 3rd place, bronze medalist(s) | 6 | 8 | 18 | | 2nd place, silver medalist(s) | 4 |
| 2024 | Olympic Trials | | | 8 | 14 | 16 | | 8 | 15 |
| 2025 | NCAA Championships | 2nd place, silver medalist(s) | | | 3rd place, bronze medalist(s) | | 14 | | |
