= Colt Walker (gymnast) =

American gymnast (born 2001)

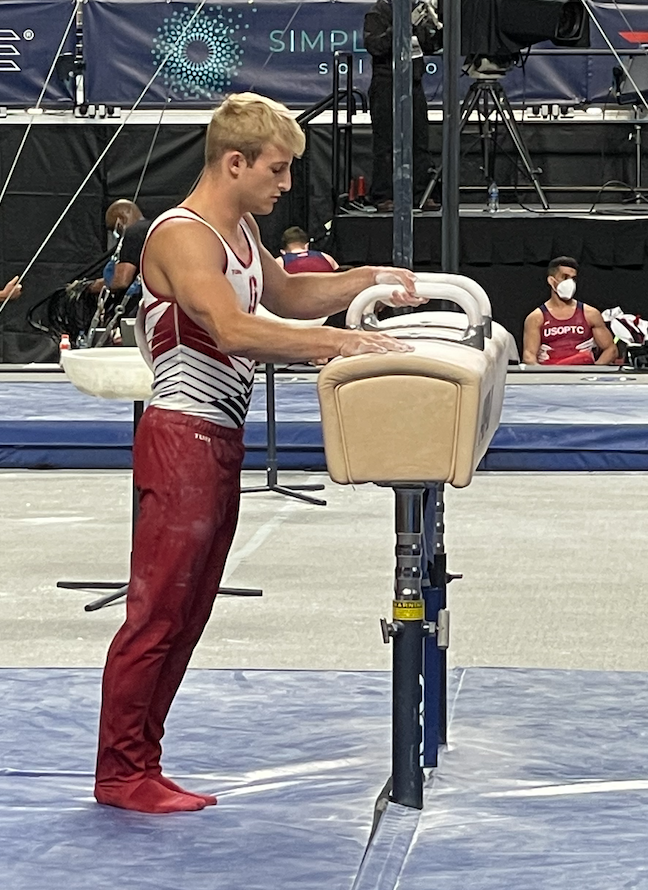
- Walker at the 2021 National Championships

Personal information
- Full name: Colt Barrett Walker
- Born: June 25, 2001 (age 25) Austin, Texas, U.S.
- Height: 5 ft 5 in (165 cm)

Gymnastics career
- Discipline: Men's artistic gymnastics
- Country represented: United States; (2022–2026)
- College team: Stanford Cardinal
- Gym: AcroTex Gymnastics
- Head coach: Thom Glielmi
- Assistant coach: Mark Freeman
- Awards: Nissen-Emery Award (2024)
Medal record
Men's artistic gymnastics
Representing United States
Event	1st	2nd	3rd
World Championships	0	0	1
Pan American Games	1	1	0
Pan American Championships	1	1	0
Total	2	2	1
World Championships
Bronze medal – third place	2023 Antwerp	Team
Pan American Games
Gold medal – first place	2023 Santiago	Team
Silver medal – second place	2023 Santiago	Parallel bars
Pan American Championships
Gold medal – first place	2022 Rio de Janeiro	Team
Silver medal – second place	2022 Rio de Janeiro	Parallel bars

Colt Barrett Walker (born June 25, 2001) is an American artistic gymnast. He is a former member of the United States men's national artistic gymnastics team and competed in collegiate gymnastics for the Stanford Cardinal. He was a member of the gold medal-winning teams at the 2022 Pan American Championships and 2023 Pan American Games and was the alternate for the bronze medal-winning team at the 2023 World Championships. He is the 2019 junior Winter Cup and National Champion.

== Early life and education ==
Walker was born in Austin, Texas, to Pam and Keith Walker. He has one sibling. He attended Chaparral Star Academy, graduating in 2020. He graduated from Stanford University in 2025 with a degree in mechanical engineering.

== Gymnastics career ==
=== 2017–18 ===
Walker competed at the RD761 International Junior Team Cup, where he finished fourth on vault and contributed to the USA's third-place finish. He competed at the 2017 National Championships in the 15-16 age division; he placed fifth in the all-around and fourth on floor exercise.

In August 2018, Walker competed at the U.S. National Championships in the junior 15-16 division. He placed ninth in the all-around, winning silver on floor exercise and vault and bronze on rings.

=== 2019 ===
Walker competed at the RD761 International Junior Team Cup, where he helped the USA win silver. Individually he won silver in the all-around behind Takeru Kitazono and won medals on five of the six apparatuses. Walker next competed at the 2019 Winter Cup where he placed first in the all-around and on vault and third on floor exercise and rings.

In August, Walker competed at the U.S. National Championships in the 17-18 age division. He finished first in the all-around, on vault, and on parallel bars and second on rings and horizontal bar.

=== 2020–21 ===
Walker became age-eligible for senior-level competition and competed at the 2020 Winter Cup. He finished 19th in the all-around. Walker did not compete for the rest of the year due to the global COVID-19 pandemic.

Walker began competing for the Stanford Cardinal men's gymnastics team during the 2020–21 season. He competed at the 2021 NCAA Championships where he helped Stanford defend their team title. At the 2021 U.S. National Championships Walker placed 12th in the all-around but won bronze on the parallel bars behind Yul Moldauer and Shane Wiskus.

=== 2022 ===
Walker placed fifth in the all-around and third on vault at the 2022 Winter Cup. He was selected to compete at the DTB Pokal Mixed Cup in Stuttgart where he competed on floor exercise and vault during the preliminary round, helping the USA qualify into the championship round. The USA clinched first place in this round with Walker's contribution on the parallel bars. At the NCAA Championship Walker helped Stanford defend their national title. Additionally he placed second on parallel bars behind teammate Curran Phillips.

In June, Walker was selected to represent the United States at the Pan American Championships alongside Riley Loos, Brody Malone, Yul Moldauer, and Shane Wiskus. On the first day of competition Walker competed on floor exercise, pommel horse, vault, and parallel bars to help qualify the United States in first place to the team final. Individually, he won silver on parallel bars behind Moldauer and recorded the fourth-highest floor exercise score and fifth-highest pommel horse score. During the team final Walker competed on floor exercise, vault, and parallel bars to help the USA win gold ahead of the reigning team champion Brazil.

In late July, Walker competed at the U.S. Classic where he placed second in the all-around behind Stanford teammate Malone with a score of 85.264 (83.750 without bonus). Additionally, he recorded the highest parallel bars score and the second-highest vault score. In August Walker competed at the U.S. National Championships where he finished sixth in all-around but recorded the second highest score when removing domestic bonuses. Additionally, he finished second on parallel bars and third on vault.

In October, Walker was named to the team to compete at the 2022 World Championships alongside Asher Hong, Brody Malone, Stephen Nedoroscik, and Donnell Whittenburg. During qualifications, Walker finished fourteenth on parallel bars and did not qualify for the event final. During the team final, Walker contributed scores on vault, parallel bars, and horizontal bar towards the USA's fifth-place finish.

=== 2023 ===
Walker spent the beginning of 2023 recovering from a bulging disk in his back. He made his debut at the MPSF Championships, where he only competed on pommel horse. He scored a 13.900, the fourth-highest score on the apparatus, and helped Stanford win the team title. In April Walker competed at the NCAA Championship, once again only competing on pommel horse. He helped Stanford win their fourth consecutive team title. In August Walker competed at the Core Hydration Classic where he competed the all-around for the first time this season. He placed eighth overall.

Walker next competed at the Xfinity National Championships, where he placed fourth in the all-around but received the highest two-day all-around score when removing domestic bonuses. The following day he was named as the alternate for the World Championships team and was named to the team to compete at the Pan American Games taking place in late October alongside Donnell Whittenburg, Shane Wiskus (later replaced by Curran Phillips), Stephen Nedoroscik, and Cameron Bock.

At the World Championships, Walker was on the competition floor supporting the team during team finals as they won the bronze medal, the USA's first team medal in nine years. As the alternate, Walker was also awarded the medal.

At the Pan American Games, Walker helped the United States win team gold. Individually, he qualified for the rings, parallel bars, and horizontal bar final. On the first day of apparatus finals, Walker finished fourth on rings. On the final day of competition he won silver on parallel bars behind compatriot Phillips and placed fifth on horizontal bar.

=== 2024 ===
Walker competed at the MPSF Championships, where he helped Stanford place first as a team. Individually, he won silver in the all-around and on parallel bars behind teammate Khoi Young. Before the NCAA Championships, Walker was awarded the Nissen-Emery Award, the highest honor in men's collegiate gymnastics. At the Championships Walker contributed scores on all apparatuses except pommel horse and helped Stanford win their fifth consecutive team title.

=== 2025 ===
Walker competed at the 2025 Winter Cup where he won the title on parallel bars. At the NCAA Championships he helped Stanford finish as runner-up to Michigan; individually he placed second on parallel bars behind Paul Juda. He was selected to represent the United States at the World University Games alongside Tate Costa, Patrick Hoopes, Alex Nitache, and Kai Uemura. While there he finished sixth in the all-around.

== Competitive history ==
Competitive history of Colt Walker at the junior level
Year	Event	Team	AA	FX	PH	SR	VT	PB	HB
2017	RD761 International Junior Team Cup	3rd place, bronze medalist(s)					4		
2017	U.S. National Championships (15-16)		5	4	7	2nd place, silver medalist(s)	12	9	13
2018	University of Calgary International Cup	3rd place, bronze medalist(s)	4			1st place, gold medalist(s)	2nd place, silver medalist(s)	3rd place, bronze medalist(s)	
2018	Elite Team Cup	1st place, gold medalist(s)							
2018	U.S. National Championships (15-16)		9	2nd place, silver medalist(s)	17	3rd place, bronze medalist(s)	2nd place, silver medalist(s)	11	8
2019	RD761 International Junior Team Cup	2nd place, silver medalist(s)	2nd place, silver medalist(s)	3rd place, bronze medalist(s)		2nd place, silver medalist(s)	1st place, gold medalist(s)	3rd place, bronze medalist(s)	2nd place, silver medalist(s)
2019	Winter Cup		1st place, gold medalist(s)	6	3rd place, bronze medalist(s)	3rd place, bronze medalist(s)	1st place, gold medalist(s)	6	10
2019	Elite Team Cup	1st place, gold medalist(s)							
2019	Berlin International Junior Team Cup	1st place, gold medalist(s)	9	3rd place, bronze medalist(s)					
2019	U.S. National Championships (17-18)		1st place, gold medalist(s)	4	5	2nd place, silver medalist(s)	1st place, gold medalist(s)	1st place, gold medalist(s)	2nd place, silver medalist(s)

Competitive history of Colt Walker at the senior level
Year	Event	Team	AA	FX	PH	SR	VT	PB	HB
2020	Winter Cup		19	19	14	13	4	7	13
2021	NCAA Championships	1st place, gold medalist(s)							
2021	U.S. National Championships		12	23	24	11	13	3rd place, bronze medalist(s)	15
2022	Winter Cup		5	14	12	11	3rd place, bronze medalist(s)	9	8
2022	DTB Pokal Mixed Cup	1st place, gold medalist(s)							
2022	MPSF Championships	1st place, gold medalist(s)		2nd place, silver medalist(s)				1st place, gold medalist(s)	8
2022	NCAA Championships	1st place, gold medalist(s)		11				2nd place, silver medalist(s)	
2022	Pan American Championships	1st place, gold medalist(s)			5			2nd place, silver medalist(s)	
2022	U.S. Classic		2nd place, silver medalist(s)	5	8	4	2nd place, silver medalist(s)	1st place, gold medalist(s)	20
2022	U.S. National Championships		6	4	24	6	3rd place, bronze medalist(s)	2nd place, silver medalist(s)	7
2022	World Championships	5							
2023	MPSF Championships	1st place, gold medalist(s)			4				
2023	NCAA Championships	1st place, gold medalist(s)			11				
2023	U.S. Classic		8	22	6	7	58	35	38
2023	U.S. National Championships		4	14	6	6		4	12
2023	World Championships	(bronze) (Note: Walker was the Team USA alternate)							
2023	Pan American Games	1st place, gold medalist(s)				4		2nd place, silver medalist(s)	5
2024	MPSF Championships	1st place, gold medalist(s)	2nd place, silver medalist(s)	4	11	5	12	2nd place, silver medalist(s)	15
2024	NCAA Championships	1st place, gold medalist(s)						6	
2024	U.S. National Championships		9	11	9	12		3rd place, bronze medalist(s)	15
2024	Olympic Trials		10	12	7	10		3rd place, bronze medalist(s)	17
2025	Winter Cup				7	10		1st place, gold medalist(s)	13
2025	NCAA Championships	2nd place, silver medalist(s)					4	2nd place, silver medalist(s)	
2025	World University Games	8	6						
2025	U.S. National Championships		4	13	14	12		7	6
2026	U.S. National Championships					10		8	
