= Evgeny Siminiuc =

Canadian artistic gymnast (born 2002)

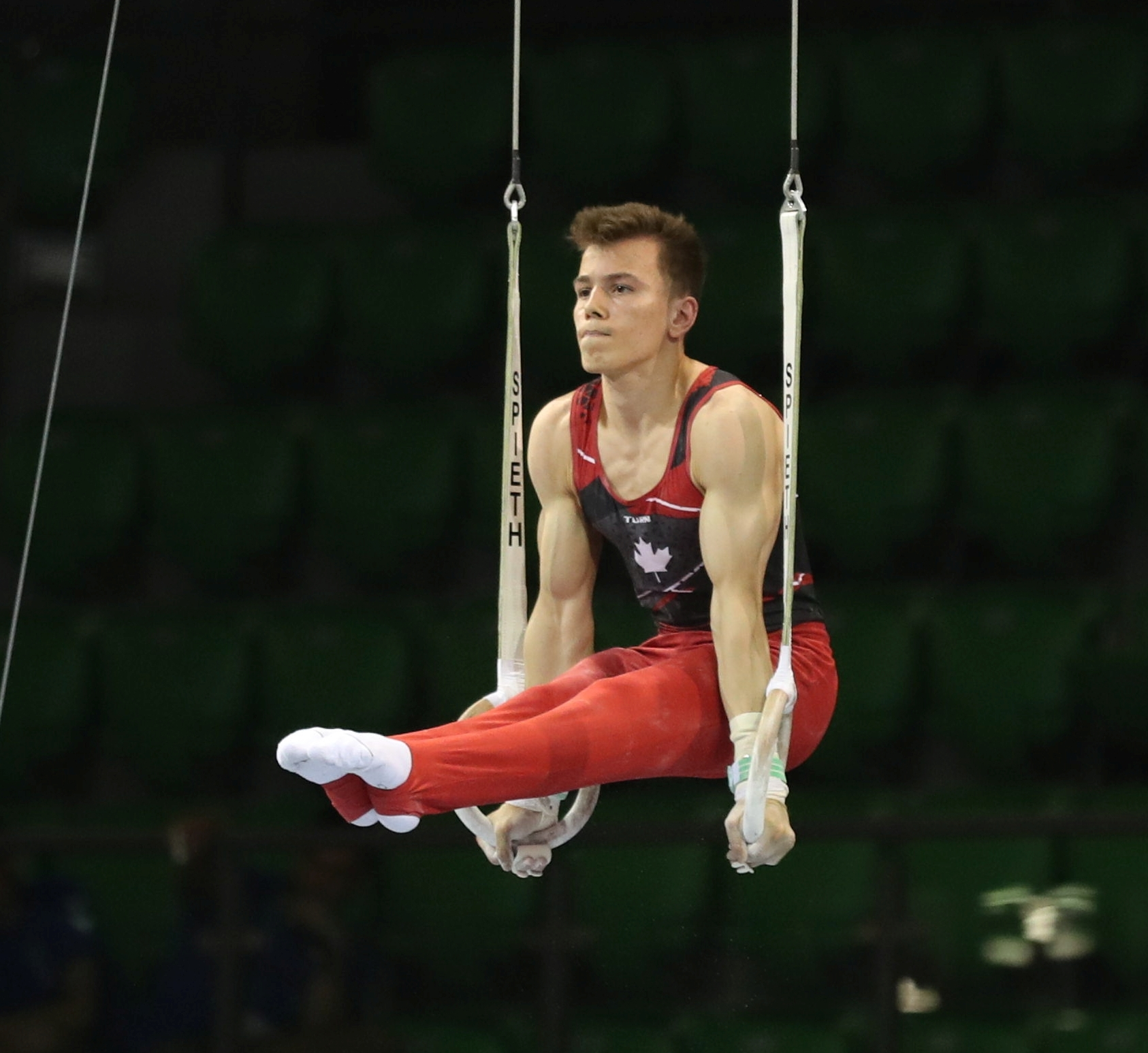
- Siminiuc in 2019

Personal information
- Born: July 31, 2002 (age 24) Toronto, Ontario, Canada

Gymnastics career
- Country represented: Canada (2016–2020, 2023–present)
- College team: Michigan Wolverines (2020–2025)
- Head coach: Yuan Xiao
- Former coach: Nistor Sandro
Medal record
Men's artistic gymnastics
Representing Canada
Pan American Championships
Silver medal – second place	2025 Panama City	Team
Bronze medal – third place	2025 Panama City	Parallel bars
Bronze medal – third place	2025 Panama City	Horizontal bar

Evgeny Siminiuc (born July 31, 2002) is a Canadian artistic gymnast. He competed in collegiate gymnastics for Michigan.

== Early life and education ==
Siminiuc was born to Olga Naconecinaia and Sergey Siminiuc, and has a sister, Alexandra. He attended Bishop Reding Catholic Secondary School in Milton, Ontario, where he was a five-star recruit and ranked as the No. 2 recruit nationally according to College Gym News. On November 13, 2019, he committed to the University of Michigan to pursue gymnastics.

== Gymnastics career ==
In April 2018, Siminiuc competed at the 2018 Pacific Rim Gymnastics Championships and helped Canada win silver as a team. Individually, he won silver on parallel bars. In June, 2019, he was selected to compete at the 2019 Junior World Championships, along with Ioannis Chronopoulos and Félix Dolci. He helped Canada place fifth as a team with a combined total of 158.563. Additionally, he placed ninth in the all around, as well as being a reserve for the rings and pommel horse finals.

During the 2021 NCAA men's gymnastics championship, Siminiuc won silver on parallel bars with a score of 14.266. During the 2022 NCAA men's gymnastics championship, he won bronze on parallel bars with a score of 14.400. During the 2025 Big Ten championships, he won gold on the high bar and silver on parallel bars. During the 2025 NCAA men's gymnastics championship, he helped Michigan win their seventh NCAA championship in program history. He also won bronze on parallel bars.

In June, 2025, he was selected to represent Canada at the 2025 Pan American Championships. He helped Canada win team silver. During the event finals, he won bronze on parallel bars and horizontal bar.
