= Padlet =

Knowledge management software

- Formerly: Wallwisher
- Company type: Private
- Founded: 2012; 14 years ago
- Founders: Nitesh Goel; (CEO); Pranav Piyush
- Headquarters: 87 Graham St, Presidio, San Francisco, California, United States; 37.8014667°N 122.4565321°W; 21 Tg Pagar Rd, Singapore; 1.279847540°N 103.8440451°E
- Area served: Global
- Services: Knowledge management
- Number of employees: 51 (2023)
- Website: padlet.com

Padlet (formerly Wallwisher) is an educational technology startup company based in San Francisco, California and Singapore. Padlet provides a cloud-based software-as-a-service, hosting a real-time collaborative web platform in which users can upload, organize, and share content to virtual bulletin boards called "padlets".

== History ==
Originally named Wallwisher, the company was started in 2008 by Nitesh Goel and Pranav Piyush, two friends from India, and was incorporated in 2012 with funding from the startup accelerator Start-Up Chile. In 2013, Padlet was additionally backed by accelerators Y Combinator and ImagineK12. As of November 2020, the company has raised over $13 million across three Series A rounds of funding.

In 2018, the company drew criticism for its abrupt switch from a free service to a paid pricing model.

During the COVID-19 pandemic, Padlet saw an increase in users, attributed to its use by educators and students following a rise in remote learning worldwide. In 2021, the platform also saw cases of offensive content—including racist, antisemitic, and pornographic material—being published on student Padlet accounts.

In August 2024, Padlet launched Sandbox, a collaborative digital whiteboard with an ability to create interactivity using links.

== Use ==
Padlet has emphasized the importance of accessibility, intuitiveness, and collaboration in the design of its interface.

Padlet is widely used among teachers; its use as a pedagogical tool has been studied in various academic journals and conferences including the Association for Computing Machinery Conference on Education Technology and Computers, and the IEEE International Conference of Educational Innovation through Technology.
