= EVO Gymnastics =

American multi-sport club

EVO Gymnastics, also known as EVO Athletics, is a multi-sport club known for its men's gymnastics program located in Sarasota, Florida.

== History ==
EVO Gymnastics is co-owned by Kyle Lawton and Lydia Lawton.

In 2016, EVO undertook a series of moves to expand. In June, EVO moved into a new facility in Sarasota, Florida. In August, it was announced that Aimee Boorman, the personal coach of Simone Biles, was hired to the staff. It then acquired Suncoast Volleyball Club to bring under the EVO brand in September.

With USA Gymnastics' decision to terminate its usage of Karolyi Ranch in January 2018, EVO served as one of two temporary training sites for the United States women's national artistic gymnastics team until November 2019.

Former United States men's national artistic gymnastics team member Sam Mikulak announced he had joined the EVO coaching staff in October 2022 with the aim to elevate the program to an official Olympic training center.

== Current staff ==
As of December 14, 2023

- Kevin Mazeika, program director
- Grant Brittan, general manager
- Sam Mikulak, men's team coach
- Syque Caesar, men's senior elite head coach

== Notable gymnasts & alumni ==
- Alex Diab
- Joshua Karnes
- Danila Leykin
- Brody Malone
- Stephen Nedoroscik
- Kameron Nelson
- Curran Phillips
- Donnell Whittenburg
- Shane Wiskus

== Notable former coaches ==
- Aimee Boorman
