= 2020 Winter Cup =

Artistic gymnastics competition in the USA

- Venue: Westgate Las Vegas
- Location: Las Vegas, Nevada, U.S.
- Dates: February 20–February 22, 2020

The 2020 Winter Cup was an artistic gymnastics competition held at the Westgate Las Vegas in Las Vegas from February 20 to February 22, 2020.

== Competition ==
The competition featured both junior and senior competitive divisions. The finals session featured the top 28 senior athletes based on the 10-point system and the top 14 juniors from the Elite Team Cup. Junior athletes advanced to the finals according to the all-around ranking from the first day of competition. All-around ranking and individual event champions were determined via a combined two-day score.

== Medalists ==
Event	Gold	Silver	Bronze
Junior Men
Individual all-around	Fuzzy Benas	Asher Hong	Fred Richard
Floor	Matt Cormier	Fred Richard	Fuzzy Benas
Pommel horse	Zachary Nunez	Asher Hong	Ian Lasic-Ellis
Rings	Fuzzy Benas	Ian Lasic-Ellis	Asher Hong
Vault	Brandon Nguyen	Fuzzy Benas	Matt Cormier
Parallel bars	Zachary Nunez	Logan Myers	Cameron Lee
Horizontal bar	Fred Richard	Steven Lukasik	Logan Myers
Senior Men
Individual all-around	Sam Mikulak	Shane Wiskus	Brody Malone
Floor	Gage Dyer	Sam Mikulak	Cameron Bock
Pommel horse	Alec Yoder	Allan Bower	Sam Mikulak
Rings	Alex Diab	Marvin Kimble	Sean Melton
Vault	Yul Moldauer	Eddie Penev Shane Wiskus	Not awarded
Parallel bars	Sam Mikulak	Grant Breckenridge	Yul Moldauer
Horizontal bar	Colin Van Wicklen	Sam Mikulak	Paul Juda

== Participants ==
The following individuals participated in the competition:

=== Juniors ===
- Andrew Layman (Denali Gymnastics)
- Joseph Pepe (North Valley)
- Jeremy Bischoff (Wallers GymJam)
- Arun Chhetri (Gym Olympica)
- Jack Critz (SCATS)
- Colin Flores (WCOGA)
- Brandon Nguyen (EGA)
- Vahe Petrosyan (Gym Olympica)
- Tyler Shimizu (WCOGA)
- Noah Giordano (5280 Gymnastics)
- Logan Myers (5280 Gymnastics)
- Luke Esparo (New Era)
- Luke McFarland (Daggetts)
- Steven Lukasik (LaFleurs Tampa)
- Toby Liang (Roswell)
- Lucas Lorber (Eyas)
- Kyden Martinez (Eyas)
- Zach Snyder (Emerge)
- Zackery Lerwill (Madison)
- Sebastian Ingersoll (Lakeshore)
- Lais Najjar (Lakeshore)
- Max Olinger (Buffalo Grove)
- Rithik Puri (Lakeshore)
- Kai Uemura (Lakeshore)
- Will Hauke (DeVeaus)
- Matt Cormier (MEGA MA)
- Christopher Hiser (Daggetts)
- Ian Lasic-Ellis (MEGA MA)
- Fred Richard (MEGA MA)
- Alex Kuzmenchuck (Paragon)
- Khoi Young (Sportsplex)
- Landen Blixt (Infinity)
- Charlie Kramer (North Shore)
- Dane Cramer (NSG)
- A.J. Morgan (NSG)
- James Friedman (OMEGA)
- Adam Wolfe (MAC Gymnastics)
- Zac Tiderman (OMEGA)
- Collin Cunane (KMC)
- Joshua Karnes (Lakettes)
- Zachary English (Palmetto)
- Kameron Nelson (Hayden's)
- Ethan Boder (GymTek)
- Nicholas Tarca (Premier Athletics)
- Michael Artlip (HGC)
- Fuzzy Benas (EnRich)
- Caden Clinton (Cypress)
- Dallas Hale (WOGA)
- Asher Hong (Cypress)
- Cameron Lee (WOGA)
- Zachary Nunez (Cypress)
- Daniel Simmons (Cypress)
- Oliver Zavel (Crenshaws)
- Taylor Christopulous (USA Gym World)
- Cole Partridge (USA Gym World)
- Colin Wingrove (USA Gym World)
- Zachary Patrick (Gymstrada)
- Ahmir Postell (Gymstrada)
- Dante Hays (Metropolitan)
- Sebastian Kane (Metropolitan)
- Brigham Frentheway (Frontier)

=== Seniors ===
- Allan Bower (University of Oklahoma)
- Brandon Briones (Stanford University)
- Anthony Mills (Arizona State)
- Donothan Bailey (USOTC)
- Cameron Bock (University of Michigan)
- Isaiah Drake (Gymnastics Olympica)
- Bennet Huang (Stanford University)
- Sam Mikulak (USOTC)
- Timothy Wang (Air Force)
- Taylor Burkhart (5280 Gymnastics)
- Adrian De Los Angeles (USOTC)
- Yul Moldauer (5280 Gymnastics)
- Frankie Valentin (Air Force)
- Sean Melton (Ohio State University)
- Bobby Malone (Stanford University)
- Grant Breckenridge (Stanford University)
- Alex Diab (University of Illinois)
- Paul Juda (University of Michigan)
- Alec Yoder (Ohio State)
- Michael Moran (University of Minnesota)
- Shane Wiskus (University of Minnesota)
- Akash Modi (Stanford University)
- Eddie Penev (Stanford University)
- Brennan Pantazis (Pennsylvania State University)
- Trevor Howard (Ohio State University)
- Gage Dyer (University of Oklahoma)
- Jordan Kovach (University of Illinois)
- Genki Suzuki (University of Oklahoma)
- Garrett Braunton (Cypress)
- Matthew Davis (Army)
- Jack Freeman (University of Oklahoma)
- Ian Gunther (Stanford University)
- Alexei Vernyi (University of Oklahoma)
- Colt Walker (AcroTexas)
- Colin Van Wicklen (University of Oklahoma)
- Matt Wenske (University of Oklahoma
- Kiwan Watts (Arizona State University)
- Benjamin Bloom (University of Washington)
- Nicholas Kuebler (Metropolitan)
- Marvin Kimble (Salto)
- Robert Neff (USOTC)
