= Alex Diab =

American gymnast (born 1997)

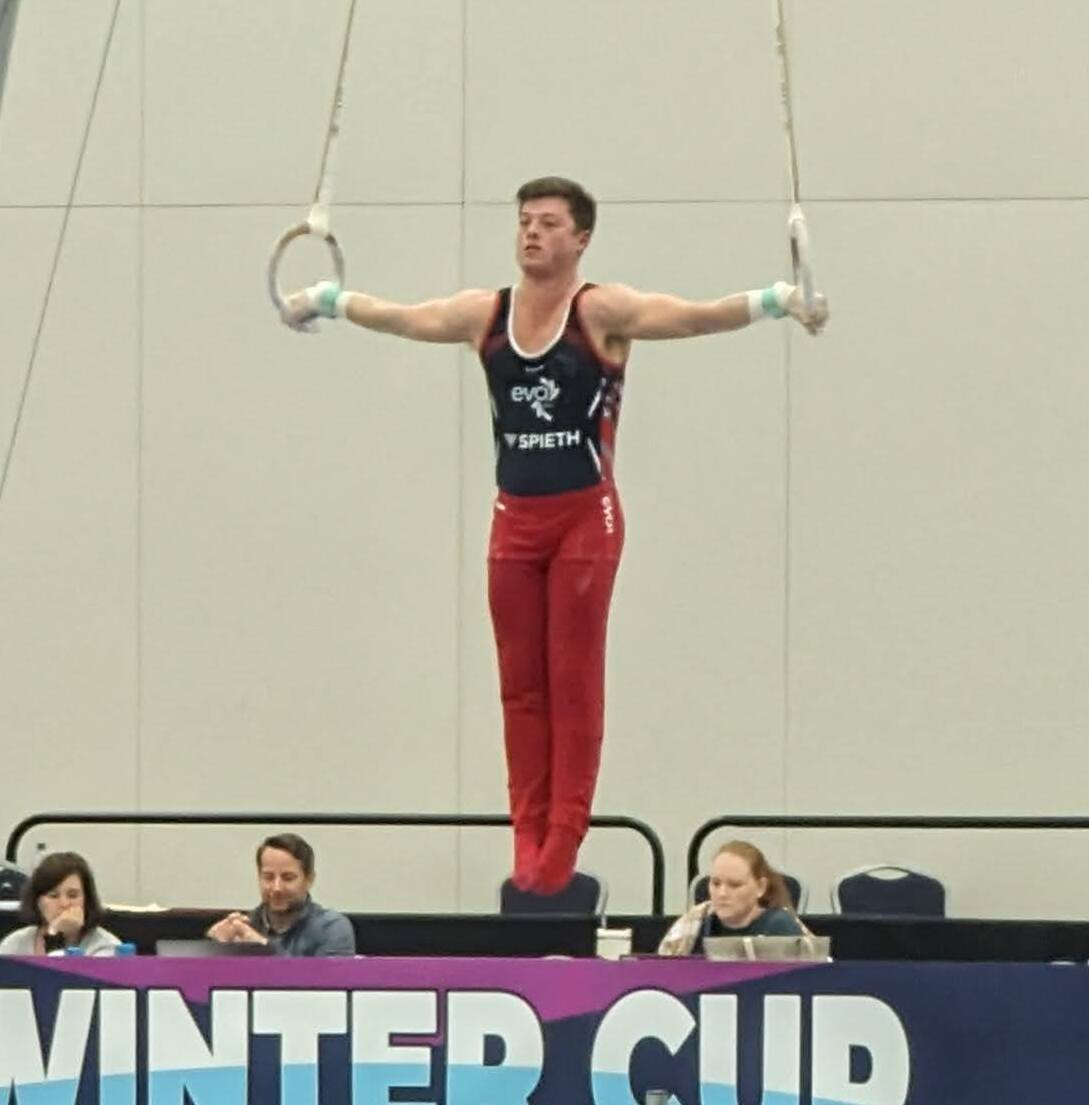
- Diab at the 2024 Winter Cup

Personal information
- Full name: Alexander Michael Diab
- Born: April 25, 1997 (age 29) Glen Ellyn, Illinois, U.S.

Gymnastics career
- Discipline: Men's artistic gymnastics
- Country represented: United States; (2021–2025)
- College team: Illinois Fighting Illini
- Gym: EVO Gymnastics; USOTC
- Head coach: Syque Caesar
Medal record
Men's artistic gymnastics
Representing the United States
| Event | 1st | 2nd | 3rd |
|---|---|---|---|
| World Cup | 0 | 0 | 1 |

Alexander Michael Diab (born April 25, 1997) is an American artistic gymnast. He is a still rings specialist and is a member of the United States men's national artistic gymnastics team. He was an alternate for the 2020 Summer Olympics. Diab was a member of the Illinois Fighting Illini men's gymnastics team from 2016 to 2019, where he won 44 career event titles and set a program record with 31 career still rings titles. He is also a two-time NCAA National Champion on still rings and a six-time NCAA All-American.

== Early life and education ==
Diab was born in Glen Ellyn, Illinois, to Mark and Jennifer Diab. His father, Mark, was an Iowa State Cyclones men's gymnastics team member from 1981 to 1986 and was the Male Athlete of the Year in 1986. He attended Glenbard West High School. He also has a sister, Maddie Diab, who also competed for the Iowa State Cyclones women's gymnastics team.

== Gymnastics career ==
=== 2016–17 ===
Diab began competing for the Illinois Fighting Illini men's gymnastics in 2016. During his freshman year, he won the still rings title at the 2016 Big Ten Championships, scoring 15.125. That was the eighth event title he won during the season, tying for second-most on the team. He also earned All-America honors on the horizontal bar at the NCAA Championships, finishing fifth on the horizontal bar with a score of 14.900. Following the season, he was named Fighting Illini Newcomer of the Year.

During his sophomore year, he won his second-straight Big Ten still rings event title, with a score of 14.875. He was NCAA All-American on still rings, earning a score of 14.650 for seventh place overall at the NCAA Championships. In August 2017, he competed at the 2017 World University Games.

=== 2018 ===
In February 2018, he competed at the 2018 Winter Cup, posting a combined score of 28.550 on still rings and winning silver.

During his junior year in April 2018, he competed at the NCAA Championships, where he posted a score of 14.500 on still rings and won gold and helped his team win bronze at the event. The win marked his 10th rings title during the season, which is the most in a season in program history.

In August 2018, he competed at the 2018 U.S. National Gymnastics Championships, where he posted a score of 14.500 on still rings on day one, and 14.450 on day two, for a combined score of 28.950, and won silver.

=== 2019 ===
In February 2019, he competed at the 2019 Winter Cup, where he posted a score of 14.550 on still rings during the preliminary round, and 14.600 to finish with a two-day total of 29.150 and won silver in the event. He also placed 10th on both floor and vault, finishing with scores of 27.250 and 28.350, respectively.

On March 2, 2019, Diab set a career-best and Illinois program record score of 15.200 on rings. He was subsequently named Big Ten Gymnast of the Week. During his senior year in April 2019, he competed at the NCAA Men's Gymnastics Championships, where he won his second straight national championship on still rings with a score of 14.733, becoming the first gymnast in program history to win two national titles on the event. Diab finished his Illinois career as a six-time NCAA All-American, a four-time Big Ten still rings champion, a two-time still rings national champion, and the school's all-time leader with 31 titles on still rings. Following the season, he was named a finalist for the Nissen Award and 2019 CGA Specialist of the Year.

In August 2019, he competed at the 2019 U.S. National Gymnastics Championships, where he finished with a two-day total of 29.350 and won gold on still rings.

=== 2020–21 ===
In February 2020, he competed at the 2020 Winter Cup, where he posted a score of 14.600 on still rings in the preliminary round, and scored a 14.850 to finish with a two-day total of 29.450 to win gold in the event. He also competed in floor exercise, vault, and horizontal bar, placing within the top 20 on each apparatus.

In February 2021, he competed at the 2021 Winter Cup, where he won gold on still rings. In June 2021, he competed at the 2021 U.S. National Gymnastics Championships, where he won gold on still rings with a score of 14.950. As a result, he qualified to compete at the Olympic trials and was named to the United States men's national gymnastics team. At the Olympic trials, he posted scores of 14.500 and 14.900 (29.400) and finished in first on still rings. He was subsequently named an alternate for Team USA at the 2020 Summer Olympics.

=== EVO ===
In mid-2021, Diab, United States Olympic Training Center teammate Shane Wiskus, and coach Syque Caesar were recruited to join EVO Gymnastics by Kevin Mazeika. Diab has said the agreement has resulted in him pursuing gymnastics full-time and being financially secure. He is training in an attempt to make the 2028 Summer Olympics in Los Angeles.

== Competitive history ==
Competitive history of Alex Diab
| Year | Event | Team | AA | FX | PH | SR | VT | PB | HB |
|---|---|---|---|---|---|---|---|---|---|
| 2012 | J.O. National Championships (JE14-15) | | 7 | 2nd place, silver medalist(s) | | 3rd place, bronze medalist(s) | | | |
| 2013 | U.S. National Championships (Junior) | | 12 | 10 | 18 | 3rd place, bronze medalist(s) | 4 | 17 | 4 |
| 2014 | J.O. National Championships (L10 JE16) | | 6 | 2nd place, silver medalist(s) | | 1st place, gold medalist(s) | | | |
| 2014 | U.S. National Championships | | 29 | 16 | 30 | 8 | 19 | 34 | 29 |
| 2015 | Winter Cup | | | 14 | 33 | 13 | 28 | 34 | 16 |
| 2015 | J.O. National Championships (JE17) | | 3rd place, bronze medalist(s) | 6 | 14 | 1st place, gold medalist(s) | 10 | 11 | 4 |
| 2016 | Winter Cup | | | 8 | | | | | |
| 2016 | NCAA Championships | 4 | 10 | | | | | | 5 |
| 2016 | U.S. National Championships | | 33 | 17 | 35 | 14 | 38 | 33 | 34 |
| 2017 | Winter Cup | | | 6 | | | | | |
| 2017 | NCAA Championships | 3rd place, bronze medalist(s) | | | | 7 | | | |
| 2017 | Universiade | 7 | 53 | 35 | | 11 | 14 | 55 | 71 |
| 2018 | Winter Cup | | | | | 2nd place, silver medalist(s) | | | |
| 2018 | NCAA Championships | 3rd place, bronze medalist(s) | | 7 | | 1st place, gold medalist(s) | | | |
| 2018 | U.S. National Championships | | | 29 | | 2nd place, silver medalist(s) | 29 | | 31 |
| 2019 | Winter Cup | | | | | 2nd place, silver medalist(s) | | | |
| 2019 | NCAA Championships | 5 | | 7 | | 1st place, gold medalist(s) | 11 | | 10 |
| 2019 | Universiade | | | 6 | | 7 | | | |
| 2019 | U.S. National Championships | | 25 | 14 | | 1st place, gold medalist(s) | 12 | | 14 |
| 2020 | Winter Cup | | | | | 1st place, gold medalist(s) | | | |
| 2021 | Winter Cup | | | | | 1st place, gold medalist(s) | | | |
| 2021 | U.S. National Championships | | | | | 1st place, gold medalist(s) | | | |
| 2021 | Olympic Trials | | | | | 1st place, gold medalist(s) | | | |
| 2022 | Winter Cup | | | | | 1st place, gold medalist(s) | | | |
| 2022 | Cairo World Cup | | | | | 6 | | | |
| 2022 | Baku World Cup | | | | | 5 | | | |
| 2022 | U.S. National Championships | | | 22 | | 2nd place, silver medalist(s) | | | |
| 2023 | Winter Cup | | | | | 1st place, gold medalist(s) | | | |
| 2023 | U.S. National Championships | | | | | 3rd place, bronze medalist(s) | | | |
| 2024 | Winter Cup | | | 20 | | 1st place, gold medalist(s) | | | |
| 2024 | U.S. National Championships | | | | | 1st place, gold medalist(s) | | | |
| 2024 | Olympic Trials | | | | | 2nd place, silver medalist(s) | | | |
| 2024 | Christmas Cup | | | | | 2nd place, silver medalist(s) | | | |
| 2025 | Winter Cup | | | | | 2nd place, silver medalist(s) | | | |
| 2025 | Baku World Cup | | | | | 3rd place, bronze medalist(s) | | | |
| 2025 | Osijek World Cup | | | | | 8 | | | |
| 2025 | Cairo World Cup | | | | | 4 | | | |
| 2025 | U.S. National Championships | | | | | 5 | | | |
