= Alec Yoder =

American artistic gymnast (born 1997)

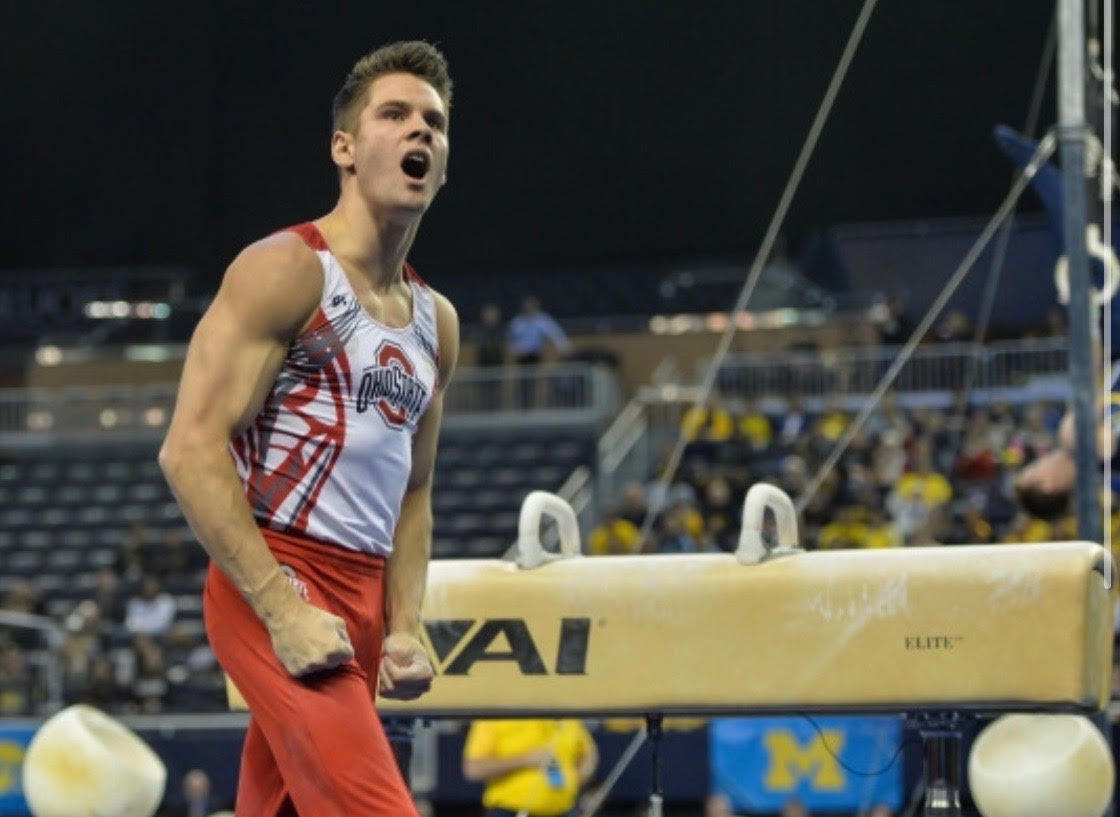
- Yoder in 2018

Personal information
- Full name: Alec Yoder
- Born: January 21, 1997 (age 29) Indianapolis, Indiana, U.S.
- Height: 5 ft 10 in (178 cm)

Gymnastics career
- Discipline: Men's artistic gymnastics
- Country represented: United States; (2015, 2017–2022)
- College team: Ohio State Buckeyes
- Gym: InterActive Academy; Indy School of Gymnastics; Deveau's School of Gymnastics
- Head coach: Rustam Sharipov
- Assistant coaches: Cas Suarez, Bob Gauthier
- Former coach: Gene Watson
- Retired: August 9, 2022
Medal record
Men's artistic gymnastics
Representing United States
Event	1st	2nd	3rd
Youth Olympic Games	0	0	1
Pacific Rim Championships	1	0	0
Total	1	0	1
Youth Olympic Games
Bronze medal – third place	2014 Nanjing	All-around
Pacific Rim Championships
Gold medal – first place	2014 Richmond	Team
FIG World Cup
Event	1st	2nd	3rd
FIG World Cup	0	0	1
Total	0	0	1

Alec Yoder (born January 21, 1997) is a retired American artistic gymnast. He was a member of the United States men's national artistic gymnastics team and represented the United States at the 2020 Olympic Games, competing as an individual athlete. He is the 2014 Youth Olympic all-around bronze medalist and the 2019 NCAA champion on pommel horse.

== Early life and education ==
Yoder was born in Indianapolis, Indiana, on January 21, 1997, to parents Michael and Rebecca Yoder. He began training in gymnastics at age four when his mother took him to a "mommy and me" class. He began training at Deveau's School of Gymnastics in Fishers, Indiana. In July 2009, he left Deveau's and began training with Coach Gene Watson, first at Indy School of Gymnastics and then at InterActive Academy in Zionsville, Indiana. He later enrolled at Ohio State University to pursue gymnastics.

== Gymnastics career ==
For both the 2013–14 and 2014–15 competitive seasons, he qualified to be a member of the US Men's Junior National Team. He was part of the 2014 Pacific Rim Championships team in Richmond, British Columbia, Canada, where he won two gold medals, a silver and a bronze. He was also a part of the 2014 Junior Pan Am Championships in Aracaju, Brazil, where he won four gold medals and a silver.

Yoder won the all-around title at the 2014 Men's Junior Olympic Men's Nationals. He also won the pommel horse and horizontal bar gold medals at that event. Following that event, Yoder was chosen by the United States Olympic Committee to represent the USA at the 2014 Youth Olympic Games in Nanjing, China.

On August 19, 2014, Yoder won the bronze medal in the boys' individual all-around at the 2014 Youth Olympic Games in Nanjing, China.

At the 2015 Winter Cup in Las Vegas, Yoder finished 8th All Around in the Senior Division and was named to the Men's Senior National Team.

At the 2015 P&G Championships, he led the pommel horse after Day 1 when he scored a rare 15.60, which placed him on the verge of becoming the youngest U.S. champion on pommel horse in 40 years. After suffering a scary fall on Day 2, he finished 5th in the pommel horse.

At the 2016 Winter Cup Challenge, he finished 9th All Around in the Senior Division.

Yoder's full recovery from labrum and bicep surgery led him to being named back to the Senior National Team for 2017-18 after finishing 11th All-Around at the 2017 P&G Championships.

Yoder continued his elite career in February 2018 by again making the 2018 Senior National Team following his performance at the 2018 Winter Cup, where he claimed sixth place in the All-Around and an individual event championship in the pommel horse.

In March 2018, Yoder returned to international competition for Team USA for the first time in four years and finished with a bronze medal in pommel horse and a fifth-place finish in the horizontal bar at the Doha World Cup in Doha, Qatar.

In August 2018, Yoder won the national championship in pommel horse and finished fifth All-Around at the US Championships in Boston. He automatically qualified back onto the Senior National Team and was then named to the World Championship Team Squad.

After a third place All-Around finish at the World Team Selection Camp, Yoder was named to the 2018 World Team to compete in Doha, Qatar for Team USA.

After graduation from Ohio State, Yoder continued to compete and returned to the 2020 Elite Winter Cup and won his second Winter Cup pommel horse championship. He repeated in 2021 to accomplish a third Winter Cup pommel horse championship.

After finishing second in the pommel horse at the 2021 US Championships, Yoder was invited to the 2021 Olympic Trials.

After the 2020 Olympic Trials, Yoder was selected to represent the United States at the 2020 Summer Olympics and will compete as an individual athlete rather than on the four-person team.

In Tokyo, Yoder scored the fourth-highest score in pommel horse preliminaries to earn a place in the Olympic Finals. In the finals, he finished sixth.

Yoder then traveled to Japan again for Team USA in October 2021 for the FIG World Championships, where he again made the pommel horse event finals, finishing fifth.

Yoder announced his retirement from the sport on August 9, 2022. Yoder finished his competitive career finishing a perfect 12/12 in his final 6 competitions. Yoder and Alex Naddour have the distinction as the only two gymnasts in Team USA history to win at least one US National Championship, NCAA Championship, Olympic Trials Championship, and Winter Cup Championship on pommel horse.

=== College ===
On November 12, 2014, Yoder signed a National Letter of Intent accepting a full-ride gymnastics scholarship to compete for the Ohio State University starting in 2015–16. Yoder began classes at Ohio State starting August 25, 2015.

As of April 2016, he has been named the Big Ten Freshman of the Week six times and the Big Ten Gymnast of the Week once. At the 2016 Big Ten Championships, Yoder helped lead the Buckeyes to their first championship since 2007. He also finished second in the all-around and first on the pommel horse. On April 2, 2016, Yoder was named the Big Ten Freshman of the Year. On April 16, Yoder became a Three-Time NCAA All American as a Freshman when he finished 5th All-Around at the NCAA Championships, while also finishing 2nd on Pommel Horse and 7th on Still Rings as he helped lead Ohio State to a third-place finish.

Yoder opted for surgery in May 2016 to repair a torn labrum and torn bicep sustained at the 2016 Big Ten Championships in event finals. His recovery was in time to compete in 2017 where he won four pommel horse event titles capped off by helping lead Ohio State to back-to-back Big Ten Team Championships, a silver medal on parallel bars at Big Ten event finals, and then a second-place team finish at NCAAs where he finished in sixth in the All-Around and fourth in pommel horse less than a year after surgery.

At NCAAs in 2018, Yoder finished third in the All-Around, fourth in pommel horse, and seventh in parallel bars. This made 8 All-American honors for Yoder in the first three years at Ohio State.

In April 2019, Yoder won his second Big Ten pommel horse championship and then followed that up with the NCAA pommel horse championship. He also was an All American on parallel bars - ending his collegiate career with 10 All American Awards, tied for fourth in Ohio State history.

== Personal life ==
Before entering Ohio State, Alec Yoder was home-schooled by his parents starting after second grade. He has two siblings, Austin and Ashlyn.

Yoder turned professional in May 2019 and is represented by Shade Global. In July 2019, he was featured in a Hugo Boss modeling campaign called the Suit Challenge, becoming one of the few men's artistic gymnasts to cross over into fashion modeling.

== Competitive history ==
Competitive history of Alec Yoder at the junior level
Year	Event	Team	AA	FX	PH	SR	VT	PB	HB
2013	U.S. National Championships		6		1st place, gold medalist(s)				
2013	International Junior Mexican Cup	1st place, gold medalist(s)	2nd place, silver medalist(s)						
2014
2014	Pan American Championships	1st place, gold medalist(s)	2nd place, silver medalist(s)		1st place, gold medalist(s)	1st place, gold medalist(s)		1st place, gold medalist(s)	8
2014	Pacific Rim Championships	1st place, gold medalist(s)	2nd place, silver medalist(s)		1st place, gold medalist(s)	3rd place, bronze medalist(s)	5		4
2014	Youth Olympic Games		3rd place, bronze medalist(s)		7			4	

Competitive history of Alec Yoder at the senior level
Year	Event	Team	AA	FX	PH	SR	VT	PB	HB
2015	Winter Cup		8	32	3rd place, bronze medalist(s)	10	20	20	7
2015	U.S. National Championships		20	30	5	12	22	35	9
2016	Winter Cup		9	25	16	6	23	18	14
2016	NCAA Championships	3rd place, bronze medalist(s)	5		2nd place, silver medalist(s)	7			
2017	Winter Cup				6			16	
2017	NCAA Championships	2nd place, silver medalist(s)	4		6				
2017	U.S. National Championships		11	9	6	18	22	20	14
2018	Winter Cup		6	18	1st place, gold medalist(s)	7	13	2nd place, silver medalist(s)	10
2018	Doha World Cup				3rd place, bronze medalist(s)				5
2018	NCAA Championships		3rd place, bronze medalist(s)		4			7	
2018	U.S. National Championships		5	12	1st place, gold medalist(s)	8	19	4	13
2018	World Team Trials		3rd place, bronze medalist(s)						
2018	World Championships	4							
2019	NCAA Championships			10	1st place, gold medalist(s)			6	19
2019	National Qualifier				4				
2020	Winter Cup				1st place, gold medalist(s)				
2021	Winter Cup				1st place, gold medalist(s)			3rd place, bronze medalist(s)	
2021	U.S. National Championships				2nd place, silver medalist(s)			8	
2021	Olympic Trials				1st place, gold medalist(s)			8	
2021	Olympic Games				6				
2021	World Team Trials				2nd place, silver medalist(s)				
2021	World Championships				5				
