= Winter Cup =

American annual gymnastics competition

The Winter Cup is an annual winter gymnastics meet for elite artistic gymnasts of the United States.

== History ==
The first edition of the Winter Cup was held in 1997 and was initially a men's artistic gymnastics competition. Women competed at the event for the first time in 2021. The competition had a combined senior and junior field until 2018.

== Past champions ==
Following is a list of past champions of the Winter Cup:

Winter Cup Champions
Year	Location	Senior Men's Champion	Junior Men's Champion	Senior Women's Champion	Junior Women's Champion
1997	Battle Creek, MI	Stephen McCain	N/A	N/A	N/A
1998	Houston, TX	Blaine Wilson	N/A	N/A	N/A
1999	Las Vegas, NV	Blaine Wilson	N/A	N/A	N/A
2000	Las Vegas, NV	Stephen McCain	N/A	N/A	N/A
2001	Las Vegas, NV	Blaine Wilson	N/A	N/A	N/A
2002	Las Vegas, NV	Todd Thornton	N/A	N/A	N/A
2003	Las Vegas, NV	Brett McClure	N/A	N/A	N/A
2004	Las Vegas, NV	Blaine Wilson	N/A	N/A	N/A
2005	Las Vegas, NV	David Durante	N/A	N/A	N/A
2006	Las Vegas, NV	David Durante	N/A	N/A	N/A
2007	Las Vegas, NV	Sean Townsend	N/A	N/A	N/A
2008	Las Vegas, NV	Paul Hamm	N/A	N/A	N/A
2009	Las Vegas, NV	Joseph Hagerty	N/A	N/A	N/A
2010	Las Vegas, NV	Chris Brooks	N/A	N/A	N/A
2011	Las Vegas, NV	Jacob Dalton	N/A	N/A	N/A
2012	Las Vegas, NV	John Orozco	N/A	N/A	N/A
2013	Las Vegas, NV	Jacob Dalton	N/A	N/A	N/A
2014	Las Vegas, NV	Chris Brooks	N/A	N/A	N/A
2015	Las Vegas, NV	Paul Ruggeri	N/A	N/A	N/A
2016	Las Vegas, NV	Sam Mikulak	N/A	N/A	N/A
2017	Las Vegas, NV	Yul Moldauer	N/A	N/A	N/A
2018	Las Vegas, NV	Sam Mikulak	Asher Hong	N/A	N/A
2019	Las Vegas, NV	Yul Moldauer	Colt Walker	N/A	N/A
2020	Las Vegas, NV	Sam Mikulak	Fuzzy Benas	N/A	N/A
2021	Indianapolis, IN	Cameron Bock	Asher Hong	Jordan Chiles	Ella Kate Parker
2022	Frisco, TX	Vitaliy Guimaraes	—N/a	Konnor McClain	Ella Kate Parker
2023	Louisville, KY	Yul Moldauer	—N/a	Lexi Zeiss	Hezly Rivera
2024	Louisville, KY	Yul Moldauer	Junnosuke Iwai	Kayla DiCello	Claire Pease
2025	Louisville, KY	Riley Loos	Adam Lakomy	Ashlee Sullivan	Lavi Crain
2026	Louisville, KY	Fred Richard	—N/a	Hezly Rivera	Kylie Smith

== See also ==
- American Cup
- U.S. Classic
- USA Gymnastics National Championships
- Olympic Trials
