= 2018 Winter Cup =

Artistic gymnastics competition in the USA

- Venue: Westgate Las Vegas
- Location: Las Vegas, Nevada, U.S.
- Dates: February 15—February 17, 2018

The 2018 Winter Cup was an artistic gymnastics competition held at the Westgate Las Vegas in Las Vegas from February 15 to February 17, 2018.

== Competition ==
The competition was the first to feature separate junior and senior competitive divisions. The finals session featured the top 28 senior athletes and the top 14 junior athletes. Junior athletes advanced to the finals according to the all-around ranking from the first day of competition. All-around ranking and individual event champions were determined via a combined two-day score. Performances at the Winter Cup helped determine the 12 men who comprised the United States men's national gymnastics team at the 2018 U.S. National Gymnastics Championships.

== Medalists ==
Event	Gold	Silver	Bronze
Junior Men
Individual all-around	Asher Hong	Bennet Huang	Kevin Penev
Floor	Paul Juda	Jeremy Bischoff	Bennet Huang
Pommel horse	Kevin Penev	Asher Hong	Lazarus Barnhill
Rings	Asher Hong	Paul Juda	Evan Davis
Vault	Kevin Penev	Bennet Huang	Paul Juda; Max Andryushchenko
Parallel bars	Asher Hong	Paul Juda	Michael Fletcher
Horizontal bar	Justin Ah Chow	Bennet Huang; Ian Gunther	
Senior Men
Individual all-around	Sam Mikulak	Marvin Kimble	Akash Modi
Floor	Sam Mikulak	Shane Wiskus Akash Modi	—
Pommel horse	Alec Yoder	Sam Mikulak	Brandon Ngai
Rings	Sean Melton	Alex Diab	Alexander Naddour
Vault	Marvin Kimble	Kanji Oyama	Adrian de los Angeles
Parallel bars	Sam Mikulak	Akash Modi Alec Yoder	—
Horizontal bar	Sam Mikulak	Grant Breckenridge	Robert Neff
