= Asher Hong =

American gymnast (born 2004)

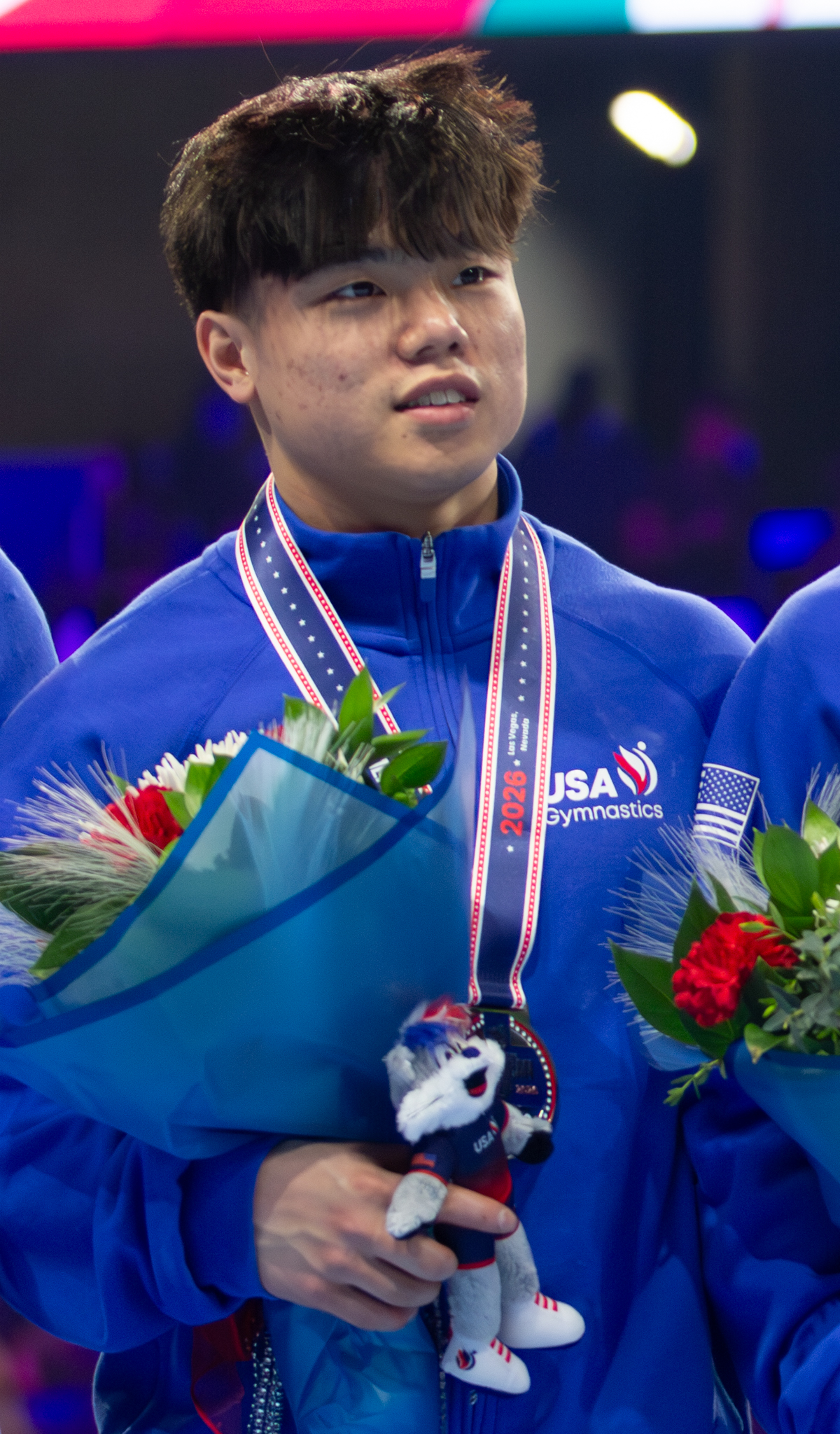
- Hong at the 2026 American Cup

Personal information
- Full name: Asher Keen Wah Hong
- Born: March 23, 2004 (age 22) Plano, Texas, U.S.
- Height: 5 ft 1 in (155 cm)

Gymnastics career
- Discipline: Men's artistic gymnastics
- Country represented: United States (2022–present)
- College team: Stanford Cardinal (2023–present)
- Gym: Cypress Academy
- Head coach: Thom Glielmi
- Former coach: Tom Meadows
Medal record
Men's artistic gymnastics
Representing United States
Event	1st	2nd	3rd
Olympic Games	0	0	1
World Championships	0	0	1
Total	0	0	2
Olympic Games
Bronze medal – third place	2024 Paris	Team
World Championships
Bronze medal – third place	2023 Antwerp	Team
Pan American Championships
Gold medal – first place	2025 Panama City	Team
- Last updated on: 21:25, 14 March 2026 (UTC).

Asher Keen Wah Hong (Chinese: 湯健華; born March 23, 2004) is an American artistic gymnast and a member of the United States men's national artistic gymnastics team. He was a member of the bronze medal-winning team at the 2023 World Championships. He represented the United States at the 2024 Summer Olympics and won a bronze medal in the team competition.

His surname 湯 is pronounced Hong when spoken in Taishanese, which is a local dialogue from Taishan, Canton Province in China (where his parents are from).

== Early life and education ==
Hong was born in Plano, Texas, on March 23, 2004, to Rick and Karen Hong. He has two brothers, Xander and Kiefer, both of whom are gymnasts and national team members. He schooled through Edgenuity Virtual Academy before enrolling at Stanford University to pursue gymnastics.

== Gymnastics career ==
=== 2018 ===
Hong competed at the RD761 International Junior Team Cup, where he helped his team place third and individually he placed sixth on floor exercise. He competed at the 2018 Winter Cup, placed first in the junior division, and won gold on rings and parallel bars. Hong was selected to compete at the Pacific Rim Championships alongside fellow juniors Lazarus Barnhill and Justin Ah Chow and seniors Sam Mikulak, Akash Modi, and Marvin Kimble; together they placed first in the team competition and Hong placed second in the all-around behind Barnhill. During event finals Hong won gold on pommel horse, silver on floor exercise, and bronze on rings and parallel bars.

=== 2019–21 ===
Hong competed at the 2019 U.S. National Championships where he finished third in the all-around in the 15-16 age division. In early 2020 Hong competed at the RD761 Gymnastics Invitational where he helped his team finish second. Individually, he won bronze on the horizontal bar. He placed second in the all-around at the 2020 Winter Cup. The rest of the competitions throughout the year were either canceled or postponed due to the global COVID-19 pandemic.

Hong returned to competition in early 2021; he competed at the Elite Team Cup and the 2021 Winter Cup. He won the junior all-around competition at the latter event. Additionally he placed first on floor exercise, pommel horse, rings, and parallel bars. In November Hong signed his National Letter of Intent with Stanford University, intending to begin competing with their gymnastics team in the 2022–2023 season.

=== 2022 ===
Hong became age-eligible for senior competition starting in 2022. He competed at the 2022 Winter Cup where he placed third in the all-around behind Vitaliy Guimaraes and Khoi Young. During event finals he won gold on vault, silver on floor exercise and rings, and bronze on parallel bars. As a result Hong was selected to represent the USA at the DTB Pokal Team Challenge in Stuttgart alongside Guimaraes, Young, Brody Malone, and Yul Moldauer. While there he helped the USA place first as a team. During event finals Hong won gold on rings, silver on floor exercise behind Félix Dolci, and placed fourth on parallel bars.

In August, Hong competed at the U.S. National Championships. He placed third in the all-around behind Brody Malone and Donnell Whittenburg. Additionally, he placed second on floor exercise, third on rings, and first on vault. In October Hong was named to the team to compete at the 2022 World Championships alongside Brody Malone, Stephen Nedoroscik, Colt Walker, and Donnell Whittenburg. During qualifications Hong finished sixth in the all-around qualified for the final. During the team final, Hong contributed scores on all apparatuses except the horizontal bar towards the USA's fifth-place finish. During the all-around final Hong finished sixth.

=== 2023 ===
Hong was selected to represent the United States at the DTB Pokal Team Challenge alongside Yul Moldauer, Brody Malone, Fred Richard, and Shane Wiskus. Together, they placed first as a team and individually Hong qualified for three event finals. He won bronze on the pommel horse. In August Hong competed at the Core Hydration Classic. He won the all-around, rings, and vault title and placed second on floor exercise behind Connor McCool.

Hong later competed at the Xfinity National Championships where he placed first in the all-around ahead of Khoi Young and Fred Richard, winning his first national championship. The following day he was named to the team to compete at the upcoming World Championships alongside Young, Richard, Yul Moldauer, Paul Juda, and alternate Colt Walker.

At the World Championships, Hong helped the USA qualify for the team final in second place. Individually, he qualified for the all-around and parallel bars finals. During the team final, he contributed scores on floor exercise, rings, vault, and parallel bars toward the USA's third-place finish. In doing so, he helped the USA win their first team medal in nine years. During the all-around final Hong placed nineteenth.

=== 2024 ===
Hong competed at the NCAA Championships in mid-April. He contributed scores on pommel horse, rings, vault, and parallel bars to help Stanford win their fifth consecutive team title. Individually, he won the title on the latter three apparatuses.

In June, Hong competed at the U.S. Olympic Trials, where he placed fifth in the all-around (167.650), first on rings (29.150), fourth on floor (28.500), fourth on parallel bars (29.550), 11th on horizontal bar (26.300) and 17th on pommel horse (24.550). On June 29, he was named to the U.S. Olympic Team to compete at the 2024 Olympic Games alongside Brody Malone, Fred Richard, Paul Juda, and Stephen Nedoroscik. During the qualification round Hong competed on all apparatuses except pommel horse, helping the USA qualify to the team final in fifth place; individually he was the first reserve for the rings and vault finals. During the team final, he contributed scores on floor exercise, rings, vault, and parallel bars towards the USA's bronze medal finish.

Hong fractured his wrist in a September training session.

=== 2025 ===
At the NCAA Championships, Hong helped Stanford finish as runner-up to Michigan. Individually, he won two event titles, on floor exercise and rings. He was selected to represent the United States at the Pan American Championships alongside Taylor Burkhart, Taylor Christopulos, Brandon Dang, Joshua Karnes, and alternate Jun Iwai. Prior to the start of the qualification round Hong fell sick and was replaced by Iwai. However, during the qualification round teammate Burkhart tweaked his back and Hong was substituted back in for the team final, during which he contributed scores on all apparatuses minus pommel horse towards the USA's first place finish and won gold in the team.

In August, Hong competed at the Xfinity National Championships where he placed first in the all-around, ahead of Fred Richard and Fuzzy Benas, winning his second national championship. He became the 13th man to win multiple national titles, and won by a margin of 7.465 points (3.7 points when not including domestic bonuses). His total margin of victory (including the domestic bonuses) surpassed the previous record of 5.55 points set by Sam Mikulak in 2019 before domestic bonuses were introduced. Hong also won the floor exercise, rings, and vault titles and placed second on parallel bars. For his performance, he was the only athlete auto-selected to the 2025 World Championships team and was later joined by Dang, Patrick Hoopes, Brody Malone, Kameron Nelson, and Donnell Whittenburg who were discretionarily selected. At the World Championships, Hong sustained an ankle injury while warming up for the qualification round; as a result he withdrew from the competition.

== Competitive history ==
Competitive history of Asher Hong at the junior level
Year	Event	Team	AA	FX	PH	SR	VT	PB	HB
2017	International Junior Team Cup (under 14)	2nd place, silver medalist(s)				1st place, gold medalist(s)		1st place, gold medalist(s)	
2018	RD761 International Junior Team Cup	3rd place, bronze medalist(s)		6					
2018	Winter Cup		1st place, gold medalist(s)		2nd place, silver medalist(s)	1st place, gold medalist(s)		1st place, gold medalist(s)	
2018	Pacific Rim Championships	1st place, gold medalist(s)	2nd place, silver medalist(s)	2nd place, silver medalist(s)	1st place, gold medalist(s)	3rd place, bronze medalist(s)		3rd place, bronze medalist(s)	
2019	U.S. National Championships (15-16)		3rd place, bronze medalist(s)	6	3rd place, bronze medalist(s)	4	7	2nd place, silver medalist(s)	5
2020	RD761 Gymnastics Invitational	2nd place, silver medalist(s)	12					8	3rd place, bronze medalist(s)
2020	Elite Team Cup	1st place, gold medalist(s)							
2020	Winter Cup		2nd place, silver medalist(s)	9	2nd place, silver medalist(s)	3rd place, bronze medalist(s)	4	5	4
2021	Elite Team Cup	1st place, gold medalist(s)							
2021	Winter Cup		1st place, gold medalist(s)	1st place, gold medalist(s)	1st place, gold medalist(s)	1st place, gold medalist(s)	6	1st place, gold medalist(s)	

Competitive history of Asher Hong at the senior level
Year	Event	Team	AA	FX	PH	SR	VT	PB	HB
2022	Winter Cup		3rd place, bronze medalist(s)	2nd place, silver medalist(s)	17	2nd place, silver medalist(s)	1st place, gold medalist(s)	3rd place, bronze medalist(s)	29
2022	DTB Pokal Team Challenge	1st place, gold medalist(s)		2nd place, silver medalist(s)		1st place, gold medalist(s)		4	
2022	U.S. National Championships		3rd place, bronze medalist(s)	2nd place, silver medalist(s)	16	3rd place, bronze medalist(s)	1st place, gold medalist(s)	6	29
2022	World Championships	5	6						
2023	Winter Cup		3rd place, bronze medalist(s)						
2023	DTB Pokal Team Challenge	1st place, gold medalist(s)			3rd place, bronze medalist(s)	5	4		
2023	MPSF Championships	1st place, gold medalist(s)	1st place, gold medalist(s)	9	5	2nd place, silver medalist(s)	4	1st place, gold medalist(s)	14
2023	NCAA Championships	1st place, gold medalist(s)	3rd place, bronze medalist(s)	17	30	6	1st place, gold medalist(s)	11	35
2023	U.S. Classic		1st place, gold medalist(s)	2nd place, silver medalist(s)	26	1st place, gold medalist(s)	1st place, gold medalist(s)	7	8
2023	U.S. National Championships		1st place, gold medalist(s)	13	15	2nd place, silver medalist(s)		5	11
2023	World Championships	3rd place, bronze medalist(s)	19					6	
2024	MPSF Championships	1st place, gold medalist(s)				1st place, gold medalist(s)	7	4	
2024	NCAA Championships	1st place, gold medalist(s)			14	1st place, gold medalist(s)	1st place, gold medalist(s)	1st place, gold medalist(s)	
2024	U.S. National Championships		10	14	20	3rd place, bronze medalist(s)		4	20
2024	Olympic Trials		5	4	17	1st place, gold medalist(s)		4	11
2024	Olympic Games	3rd place, bronze medalist(s)				R1	R1		
2025	NCAA Championships	2nd place, silver medalist(s)		1st place, gold medalist(s)		1st place, gold medalist(s)	2nd place, silver medalist(s)	4	
2025	Pan American Championships	1st place, gold medalist(s)							
2025	U.S. National Championships		1st place, gold medalist(s)	1st place, gold medalist(s)	9	1st place, gold medalist(s)	1st place, gold medalist(s)	2nd place, silver medalist(s)	25
2025	World Championships		DNS						
2026	American Cup	2nd place, silver medalist(s)							
2026	NCAA Championships	1st place, gold medalist(s)			23	2nd place, silver medalist(s)	11	3rd place, bronze medalist(s)	
