= Gymnastics at the 2015 Summer Universiade – Men's pommel horse =

Men's pommel horse at the 2015 Summer Universiade
- Venue: Gwangju Women's University Universiade Gymnasium
- Date: July 7, 2015
- Competitors: 8 from 6 nations

Medalists
gold medal	Donothan Bailey	United States
silver medal	Naoto Hayasaka	Japan
bronze medal	Akash Modi	United States

The Men's pommel horse Gymnastics at the 2015 Summer Universiade in Gwangju was held on 7 July at the Gwangju Women's University Universiade Gymnasium.

== Schedule ==
All times are Korea Standard Time (UTC+09:00)

Date	Time	Event
Tuesday, 7 July 2015	11:30	Final

== Results ==
Rank	Athlete	Score
1st place, gold medalist(s)	Donothan Bailey (USA)	14.766
2nd place, silver medalist(s)	Naoto Hayasaka (JPN)	14.741
3rd place, bronze medalist(s)	Akash Modi (USA)	14.633
4	Daulet Narmetov (KAZ)	14.566
5	In Geun-jung (KOR)	14.333
6	Oleg Verniaiev (UKR)	13.733
7	Severin Rohrer (SUI)	13.233
8	Shogo Nonomura (JPN)	12.700
