= 2020 United States Olympic trials (gymnastics) =

2020 U.S. Olympic trials
- Venue: The Dome at America's Center
- Location: St. Louis, Missouri
- Date: June 24–27, 2021
- Competitors: see participants

The 2020 U.S. Olympic gymnastics team trials were held June 24–27, 2021 at The Dome at America's Center in St. Louis. At the conclusion of the event, USA Gymnastics named both the men's and women's team to represent the United States at the 2020 Summer Olympics.

== Venue ==
In April 2019 USA Gymnastics announced that the 2020 Olympic trials would be held in St. Louis, Missouri and take place at the Enterprise Center. The event was originally scheduled for June 25–28, 2020. In March 2020 the Olympic Games were postponed until summer 2021 due to the COVID-19 pandemic. In July USA Gymnastics announced the new dates for the Olympic trials as June 24–27, 2021.

In May 2021 USA Gymnastics announced that the venue had changed to The Dome at America's Center due to current arena capacity limits and other COVID-related challenges.

== Participants ==
=== Women ===
Name	Hometown	Club	College	Nationals
Simone Biles	Spring, Texas	World Champions Centre	Professional	1st
~~Skye Blakely~~ (Note: Blakely was injured during warmups and withdrew from the competition)	Frisco, Texas	WOGA	Florida Gators	7th
Jade Carey	Phoenix, Arizona	Arizona Sunrays	Oregon State Beavers	6th
Jordan Chiles	Spring, Texas	World Champions Centre	UCLA Bruins	3rd
Kayla DiCello	Boyds, Maryland	Hill's Gymnastics	Florida Gators	11th
Amari Drayton	Spring, Texas	World Champions Centre	LSU Tigers	14th
Kara Eaker	Grain Valley, Missouri	GAGE	Utah Utes	10th
Addison Fatta	Wrightsville, Pennsylvania	Prestige Gymnastics	Oklahoma Sooners	16th
Shilese Jones	Westerville, Ohio	Future Gymnastics		12th
Emily Lee	Los Gatos, California	West Valley Gymnastics	UCLA Bruins	13th
Sunisa Lee	St. Paul, Minnesota	Midwest Gymnastics	Auburn Tigers	2nd
Emma Malabuyo	Flower Mound, Texas	Texas Dreams	UCLA Bruins	4th
Grace McCallum	Isanti, Minnesota	Twin City Twisters	Utah Utes	7th
Riley McCusker	Brielle, New Jersey	Arizona Sunrays	Florida Gators	–
Zoe Miller	Spring, Texas	World Champions Centre	LSU Tigers	17th
Ava Siegfeldt	Williamsburg, Virginia	World Class Gymnastics	Oklahoma Sooners	15th
Mykayla Skinner	Gilbert, Arizona	Desert Lights Gymnastics	Utah Utes	9th
Leanne Wong	Overland Park, Kansas	GAGE	Florida Gators	5th

=== Men ===
Name	Hometown	Club	Nationals
Cameron Bock	Ann Arbor, Michigan	University of Michigan	Pan American Championships Team (Note: The Pan American Championships were held the same weekend as the U.S. National Championships. USA Gymnastics still opted to send a team because, if an American gymnast finished in one of the top-two positions in the all-around, the U.S. would earn a +1 quota spot for the upcoming Olympic Games. Therefore all members of the Pan American Championships team were automatically qualified to the Olympic trials.)
Allan Bower	Chandler, Arizona	University of Oklahoma	5th
Brandon Briones	Gilbert, Arizona	Stanford University	4th
Alex Diab	Glen Ellyn, Illinois	University of Illinois	–
Gage Dyer	Yukon, Oklahoma	University of Oklahoma	–
Vitaliy Guimaraes	Norman, Oklahoma	University of Oklahoma	Pan American Championships Team
Ian Gunther	Houston, Texas	Stanford University	8th
Paul Juda	Deerfield, Illinois	University of Michigan	Pan American Championships Team
Riley Loos	El Dorado Hills, California	Stanford University	Pan American Championships Team
Brody Malone	Belfast, Tennessee	Stanford University	1st
Sam Mikulak	Newport Coast, California	USOPTC	3rd
Akash Modi	Morganville, New Jersey	Stanford University	6th
Yul Moldauer	Arvada, Colorado	5280 Gymnastics	2nd
Stephen Nedoroscik	Worcester, Massachusetts	Penn State University	–
Robert Neff	Brookfield, Wisconsin	USOPTC	7th
~~Eddie Penev~~ (Note: Penev sustained a knee injury days before the competition and withdrew.)	Penfield, New York	USOPTC	–
Colin Van Wicklen	Spring, Texas	Cypress Academy	–
Matt Wenske	Houston, Texas	University of Oklahoma	10th
Donnell Whittenburg	New Berlin, Wisconsin	Salto Gymnastics	Pan American Championships Team
Shane Wiskus	Spring Park, Minnesota	USOPTC	9th
Alec Yoder	Indianapolis, Indiana	Ohio State University	–

== Broadcasting and schedule ==
NBC broadcast the event. The schedule is as follows (all times in ET):

- June 24: Men Day 1 – 6:30 p.m. (NBCSN and live stream)
- June 25: Women Day 1 – 8 p.m. (NBC and live stream)
- June 26: Men Day 2 – 3 p.m. (Olympic Channel and live stream) / 4 p.m. (NBC and live stream)
- June 27: Women Day 2 – 8:30 p.m. (NBC and live stream)

== Medalists ==
Event	Gold	Silver	Bronze
Women
Individual all-around	Simone Biles	Sunisa Lee	Jordan Chiles
Vault	Simone Biles	MyKayla Skinner	Jordan Chiles
Uneven bars	Sunisa Lee	Jordan Chiles	Simone Biles
Balance beam	Sunisa Lee	Kara Eaker	Simone Biles
Floor	Simone Biles	Leanne Wong	Jordan Chiles
Men
Individual all-around	Brody Malone	Yul Moldauer	Shane Wiskus
Floor	Sam Mikulak	Brody Malone	Yul Moldauer
Pommel horse	Alec Yoder	Yul Moldauer	Stephen Nedoroscik
Rings	Alex Diab	Brody Malone	Yul Moldauer Donnell Whittenburg
Vault	Donnell Whittenburg	Riley Loos	Gage Dyer
Parallel bars	Yul Moldauer	Shane Wiskus	Brody Malone
Horizontal bar	Brody Malone	Sam Mikulak	Shane Wiskus

== Results ==
=== Women ===
==== Final scores ====
Rank	Gymnast	Vault	Uneven bars	Balance beam	Floor exercise	Day total	Total
1st place, gold medalist(s)	Simone Biles	15.466	14.600	15.133	15.366	60.565	118.098
1st place, gold medalist(s)	Simone Biles	15.400	13.833	13.700	14.600	57.533	118.098
2nd place, silver medalist(s)	Sunisa Lee	14.400	15.300	14.733	13.233	57.666	115.832
2nd place, silver medalist(s)	Sunisa Lee	14.600	14.900	14.733	13.933	58.166	115.832
3rd place, bronze medalist(s)	Jordan Chiles	14.966	14.300	14.233	13.633	57.132	114.631
3rd place, bronze medalist(s)	Jordan Chiles	14.933	14.433	13.900	14.233	57.499	114.631
4	Grace McCallum	14.633	13.833	13.866	14.166	56.498	112.564
4	Grace McCallum	14.766	14.000	13.800	13.500	56.066	112.564
5	Mykayla Skinner	15.133	13.466	14.133	13.866	56.598	112.264
5	Mykayla Skinner	15.266	13.500	13.400	13.500	55.666	112.264
6	Kayla DiCello	14.600	13.966	13.766	13.966	56.298	111.231
6	Kayla DiCello	14.833	12.800	13.800	13.500	54.933	111.231
7	Kara Eaker	13.966	13.466	14.400	13.733	55.565	111.097
7	Kara Eaker	14.033	13.233	14.566	13.700	55.532	111.097
8	Leanne Wong	14.700	13.666	11.500	13.933	53.799	110.532
8	Leanne Wong	14.700	13.800	14.000	14.233	56.733	110.532
9	Emma Malabuyo	14.366	13.900	13.000	13.566	54.832	110.531
9	Emma Malabuyo	14.333	13.433	14.200	13.733	55.699	110.531
10	Shilese Jones	14.900	13.166	13.533	13.400	54.999	109.632
10	Shilese Jones	14.900	12.900	13.300	13.533	54.633	109.632
11	Addison Fatta	14.366	13.233	12.800	13.000	53.399	106.698
11	Addison Fatta	14.566	13.400	12.733	12.600	53.299	106.698
12	Zoe Miller	13.933	13.766	12.566	12.200	52.465	105.797
12	Zoe Miller	13.700	13.633	13.133	12.866	53.332	105.797
13	Amari Drayton	14.333	13.100	12.366	13.300	53.099	105.631
13	Amari Drayton	14.300	13.566	12.600	12.066	52.532	105.631
14	Ava Siegfeldt	13.900	12.066	13.166	12.433	51.565	103.396
14	Ava Siegfeldt	14.166	13.466	11.833	12.366	51.831	103.396
15	Emily Lee	14.400	11.433	13.833	13.733	53.399	98.697
15	Emily Lee	14.466	12.900	13.566	4.366 (Note: Lee sustained an injury during her FX routine and did not finish)	45.298	98.697
–	Jade Carey	15.200	11.300	13.266	13.133	52.899	80.065
–	Jade Carey	–	13.733	13.433	–	27.166	80.065
–	Riley McCusker	–	14.800	–	–	14.800	28.366
–	Riley McCusker	–	13.566	–	–	13.566	28.366

=== Men ===
==== Final scores ====
Rank	Gymnast	Floor exercise	Pommel horse	Rings	Vault	Parallel bars	High bar	Day total	Total
1st place, gold medalist(s)	Brody Malone	14.600	13.400	14.200	14.500	14.100	14.450	85.250	171.600
1st place, gold medalist(s)	Brody Malone	14.500	13.900	14.250	14.500	14.400	14.800	86.350	171.600
2nd place, silver medalist(s)	Yul Moldauer	14.250	14.100	14.050	14.400	14.400	12.450	83.650	168.600
2nd place, silver medalist(s)	Yul Moldauer	14.800	14.250	14.150	14.450	14.550	12.750	84.950	168.600
3rd place, bronze medalist(s)	Shane Wiskus	14.000	13.500	13.900	14.600	14.500	13.800	84.300	168.150
3rd place, bronze medalist(s)	Shane Wiskus	14.200	13.150	14.050	14.500	14.350	13.600	83.850	168.150
4	Sam Mikulak	14.600	13.150	13.300	14.350	13.950	13.850	83.200	166.750
4	Sam Mikulak	14.700	12.400	13.700	14.250	13.750	14.750	83.550	166.750
5	Brandon Briones	13.900	13.550	13.650	14.350	13.950	13.300	82.700	166.700
5	Brandon Briones	14.400	13.550	14.000	14.400	14.050	13.600	84.000	166.700
6	Akash Modi	14.150	13.250	13.400	14.200	13.950	13.600	82.550	166.050
6	Akash Modi	13.650	13.800	13.850	14.250	14.300	13.650	83.500	166.050
7	Allan Bower	14.400	14.050	13.150	14.500	13.450	12.950	82.500	165.450
7	Allan Bower	14.400	14.150	13.500	14.450	13.700	12.750	82.950	165.450
8	Paul Juda	14.450	13.550	13.700	13.950	13.950	12.600	82.200	164.600
8	Paul Juda	13.900	13.550	13.650	13.200	14.250	13.850	82.400	164.600
9	Riley Loos	13.900	12.400	14.000	14.550	13.600	13.200	81.650	163.700
9	Riley Loos	13.800	13.000	13.900	14.800	13.200	13.350	82.050	163.700
10	Cameron Bock	13.300	13.900	13.800	13.200	13.800	13.750	81.750	163.300
10	Cameron Bock	12.250	13.800	13.850	13.600	14.500	13.550	81.550	163.300
11	Vitaliy Guimaraes	13.500	13.400	13.100	14.700	13.100	12.450	80.250	162.450
11	Vitaliy Guimaraes	14.300	13.400	13.200	14.500	13.450	13.350	82.200	162.450
12	Ian Gunther	13.650	13.500	13.500	13.300	13.700	13.250	80.900	160.550
12	Ian Gunther	13.600	13.050	13.600	12.400	13.650	13.350	79.650	160.550
13	Robert Neff	13.600	12.250	13.200	14.350	13.800	13.350	80.550	160.450
13	Robert Neff	11.950	12.850	13.300	14.550	13.700	13.550	79.900	160.450
14	Matt Wenske	13.800	11.700	12.900	12.900	13.900	12.400	77.600	154.550
14	Matt Wenske	13.600	10.600	12.600	14.200	13.400	12.550	76.950	154.550
15	Donnell Whittenburg	13.050	11.450	14.100	15.050	13.200	12.850	79.700	121.900
15	Donnell Whittenburg	13.700	–	14.100	14.400	–	–	42.200	121.900
16	Gage Dyer	14.250	–	–	14.500	–	–	28.750	58.150
16	Gage Dyer	14.650	–	–	14.750	–	–	29.400	58.150
17	Alec Yoder	–	15.050	–	–	13.900	–	28.950	57.500
17	Alec Yoder	–	14.550	–	–	14.000	–	28.550	57.500
18	Alex Diab	–	–	14.500	–	–	–	14.500	29.400
18	Alex Diab	–	–	14.900	–	–	–	14.900	29.400
19	Stephen Nedoroscik	–	13.650	–	–	–	–	13.650	28.300
19	Stephen Nedoroscik	–	14.650	–	–	–	–	14.650	28.300

== Olympic team selection ==
=== Women's team ===
The top two all-around finishers, Simone Biles and Sunisa Lee, were automatically named to the Olympic team. A selection committee filled out the team with third and fourth place finishers Jordan Chiles and Grace McCallum. Jade Carey had qualified an individual berth via the Apparatus World Cup series. The United States women had also earned an additional Olympic spot, separate from the four-person team, which the selection committee gave to 2016 Olympic alternate and fifth place finisher MyKayla Skinner. Four alternates were selected: Kayla DiCello, Leanne Wong, Kara Eaker, and Emma Malabuyo.

=== Men's team ===
The top all-around finisher, Brody Malone, was automatically named to the Olympic team. Because second place finisher Yul Moldauer recorded top three scores on at least three apparatuses, he too was automatically named to the Olympic team. Shane Wiskus and Sam Mikulak, the third and fourth place finishers, were named to the team by the selection committee. The men had also qualified an additional Olympic spot, separate from the four-person team, at the 2021 Pan American Gymnastics Championships. The selection committee gave this Olympic berth to pommel horse specialist Alec Yoder. Brandon Briones, Cameron Bock, Allan Bower, Akash Modi, and Alex Diab were named as the alternates.
