= Paul Juda =

American gymnast (born 2001)

- Full name: Paul Wojciech Juda
- Born: July 7, 2001 (age 25) Des Plaines, Illinois, U.S.
- Height: 5 ft 4 in (163 cm)

Gymnastics career
- Discipline: Men's artistic gymnastics
- Country represented: United States; (2020–2025)
- College team: Michigan Wolverines
- Head coach: Yuan Xiao
- Assistant coaches: Jordan Gaarenstroom, Juha Tanskanen
- Retired: August 9, 2025
- Awards: Nissen-Emery Award (2023)
Medal record
Men's artistic gymnastics
Representing United States
Event	1st	2nd	3rd
Olympic Games	0	0	1
World Championships	0	0	1
Pan American Championships	0	2	0
Total	0	2	2
Olympic Games
Bronze medal – third place	2024 Paris	Team
World Championships
Bronze medal – third place	2023 Antwerp	Team
Pan American Championships
Silver medal – second place	2021 Rio de Janeiro	Team
Silver medal – second place	2021 Rio de Janeiro	All-around
FIG World Cup
Event	1st	2nd	3rd
World Cup	0	2	0
Total	0	2	0

Paul Wojciech Juda (/ˈdʒuːdə/ JOO-də; born July 7, 2001) is an American retired artistic gymnast. He is a member of the United States men's national artistic gymnastics team. He was a member of the bronze medal-winning team at the 2023 World Championships and the bronze medal-winning team at the 2024 Olympic Games. He was also a two-time silver medalist at the 2021 Pan American Championships. In NCAA Gymnastics, he competed for the Michigan Wolverines, where he won six Big Ten titles (two individual and four team) and nine NCAA championships (six individual and three team).

== Early life and education ==
Juda was born in Des Plaines, Illinois, to Ewa Bacher and Jozef Juda, both Polish immigrants. He has two older siblings. He attended Stevenson High School in Lincolnshire, Illinois, before enrolling at the University of Michigan to pursue gymnastics. He earned a bachelor's degree in psychology in 2023 and later enrolled as a graduate student at Michigan's Rackham Graduate School studying real estate development.

== Gymnastics career ==
=== Junior ===
==== 2016–17 ====
Juda competed at the 2016 Junior Olympic National Championships, where he won gold in the floor exercise and silver in parallel bars and horizontal bar. In May 2017, he competed at the 2017 Junior Olympic National Championships where he won gold in the all-around. In August 2017, he competed at the 2017 U.S. National Gymnastics Championships in the junior division, where he won a silver medal in the all-around and on still rings and parallel bars.

==== 2018–19 ====
He competed at the 2018 Winter Cup in the junior division. He won gold on floor exercise and silver on still rings and parallel bars. In August 2018, he competed at the 2018 U.S. National Gymnastics Championships at the junior division, where he won gold on still rings, sixth on pommel horse, and sixth on floor exercise. In August 2019, he competed at the 2019 U.S. National Gymnastics Championships, where he won bronze on horizontal bar, and compiled a score of 159.850 to place 13th. Following his performance at the competition, he was named to the United States men's national junior gymnastics team.

=== Senior ===
==== 2020 ====
In February 2020, Juda competed at the 2020 Winter Cup, where he won bronze on horizontal bars, tied for fifth on floor exercise, and eighth in all-around (81.650). Following his outstanding performance at the Winter Cup, he was named to the United States men's national gymnastics team. At 19 years old, he became the national team's youngest member.

In November 2020, he competed at the 2020 Friendship and Solidarity Competition where he won a gold medal with Team Solidarity. On individual events, he scored a 14.40 on vault, a 13.80 on floor exercise, a 13.40 on pommel horse, a 13.00 on still rings, a 13.20 on parallel bars and an 11.50 on horizontal bar. The event served as Juda's first senior-level international competition.

Juda began competing for the Michigan Wolverines men's gymnastics team in 2020. During a season that was shortened due to the COVID-19 pandemic, he was named Big Ten Gymnast of the Week once, Big Ten Freshman of the Week twice, and CGA Gymnast of the Week and CGA Gymnast Freshman of the Week once. He recorded a 15.000 on horizontal bar for his season high, the third-highest score in the NCAA. He captured eight individual event titles, including three on the horizontal bar, and earned CGA All-America honors on the horizontal bar after leading the nation with an average score of 14.083. He finished the season ranked No. 6 in the NCAA in the all-around, averaging a 79.750 score. Following the season, he was named Big Ten Conference Freshman of the Year.

==== 2021 ====
In February 2021, he competed at the 2021 Winter Cup, where he finished fourth on parallel bars with a score of 13.900, and sixth in the all-around with a score of 79.850.

During the 2021 NCAA season, he captured thirteen event titles and was the top-ranked all-around gymnast in the country, with a national qualifying average of 86.167. He was also ranked No. 1 nationally on horizontal bar (14.367), No. 1 in the Big Ten on parallel bars (14.617), and second in the league on floor exercise (14.533), still rings (14.300), and pommel horse (14.250). He helped Michigan advance to the 2021 NCAA Men's Gymnastics Championship, where he won silver on the pommel horse and helped the team win bronze. Following the season, he was named Big Ten Conference Gymnast of the Year and CGA National MVP.

In June 2021, he competed at the 2021 Pan American Gymnastics Championships and won silver in the all-around with a score of 83.000. As a result, he qualified to compete at the Olympic Trials.

==== 2022 ====
In March 2022, Juda competed at the Cairo World Cup, where he won silver on the floor exercise and horizontal bar.

During the 2022 NCAA season, he won eleven event titles and was named Big Ten Gymnast of the Week twice. He led the conference on parallel bars (14.080 average, 14.800 high score) and horizontal bar (14.258 average, 14.500 high score). His season-best all-around score of 86.100 was the top score of any Big Ten all-arounder. Following the season, he was again named Big Ten Gymnast of the Year, joining Sam Mikulak as the only Michigan gymnast to win the award multiple times. During the 2022 Big Ten Tournament Championship, he won the all-around competition with a cumulative score of 85.350. He won a title on horizontal bar, scoring a 14.500. The horizontal bar win by Juda was the 15th in program history and the first since Sam Mikulak in 2013. He was also named Big Ten Gymnast of the Championships.

During the 2022 NCAA men's gymnastics championship, Juda won the all-around with an 85.298, and vault individual titles, and helped Michigan place third in the team competition with a season-best 414.490. He also placed second on the horizontal bar, fourth on parallel bars, and eighth on both floor exercise and still rings. He tied Mikulak's modern-era school record of six All-America honors.

==== 2023 ====
Juda missed the 2023 season due to injury. On April 13, 2023, he was named the Nissen-Emery Award winner.

Juda returned to competition in August at the Core Hydration Classic. He placed third in the all-around behind Asher Hong and Khoi Young. Additionally he placed third on vault and horizontal bar. He next competed at the Xfinity National Championships where he placed sixth in the all-around but won the national title on floor exercise. The following day he was named to the team to compete at the upcoming World Championships alongside Asher Hong, Khoi Young, Yul Moldauer, Fred Richard, and alternate Colt Walker.

At the World Championships, Juda helped the USA qualify to the team final in second place. Individually, he qualified for the vault and horizontal bar finals. During the team final, he contributed scores on rings, vault, and horizontal bar toward the USA's third-place finish. In doing so, he helped the USA win their first team medal in nine years.

==== 2024 ====
During the 2024 NCAA men's gymnastics championship, Juda won the floor individual title with a score of 14.800 and placed second on vault with a score of 15.133. He helped Michigan finish as runner-up in the team competition. This was Michigan's first floor title since Brian Winkler in 1992.

In June, Juda competed at the U.S. Olympic Trials, where he placed fourth in the all-around with a score of 168.850. He also placed second on floor (28.850), third on pommel horse (28.300), fifth on horizontal bar (27.250), sixth on still rings (27.650), and thirteenth on parallel bars (27.900). On June 29, he was named to the U.S. Olympic Team to compete at the 2024 Olympic Games alongside Fred Richard, Brody Malone, Asher Hong, and Stephen Nedoroscik.

During qualification at the Olympic Games, Juda qualified for the individual all-around final in 13th place. He competed in the lead-off spot for Team USA in five of the six events. In the team final, he competed on floor exercise, pommel horse, vault, and horizontal bar, contributing to the first Olympic team medal won by the men's team in sixteen years.

Following the Olympics, Juda returned to Michigan, helping lead the team to a national title.

==== 2025 ====
During the 2025 NCAA men's gymnastics championship, Juda won the parallel bars individual title with a season-high score of 14.200, and placed second in the all-around with a score of 82.164. He helped Michigan win its seventh NCAA men's gymnastics championships title.

On August 9, 2025, Juda announced his retirement at the 2025 U.S. National Gymnastics Championships.

== Personal life ==
Following the 2024 Summer Olympics, Juda became the chief revenue and brand officer at GymnastX, a gymnastics apparel company. On April 19, 2025, Juda proposed to his girlfriend Reyna Guggino after winning the 2025 NCAA men's gymnastics championship.

== Competitive history ==
Competitive history of Paul Juda at the junior level
Year	Event	Team	AA	FX	PH	SR	VT	PB	HB
2016	J.O. National Championships (JE14)		5	1st place, gold medalist(s)	24	11	5	2nd place, silver medalist(s)	2nd place, silver medalist(s)
2017	J.O. National Championships (JE15)		1st place, gold medalist(s)	1st place, gold medalist(s)	7	3rd place, bronze medalist(s)	2nd place, silver medalist(s)	10	1st place, gold medalist(s)
2017	U.S. National Championships		3rd place, bronze medalist(s)	4	19	2nd place, silver medalist(s)	11	2nd place, silver medalist(s)	2nd place, silver medalist(s)
2018	U.S. National Championships		16	6	6	1st place, gold medalist(s)	24	25	21
2018	Winter Cup		4	1st place, gold medalist(s)	14	2nd place, silver medalist(s)	3rd place, bronze medalist(s)	2nd place, silver medalist(s)	11

Competitive history of Paul Juda at the senior level
Year	Event	Team	AA	FX	PH	SR	VT	PB	HB
2019	U.S. National Championships		12	14	16	12	16	14	3rd place, bronze medalist(s)
2020	Winter Cup		8	12	27	15	3rd place, bronze medalist(s)	17	4
2020	Friendship & Solidarity Meet	1st place, gold medalist(s)							
2021	Winter Cup		6	12	14	8	19	4	12
2021	NCAA Championships	3rd place, bronze medalist(s)	6	23	2nd place, silver medalist(s)	19	11	31	40
2021	Pan American Championships	2nd place, silver medalist(s)	2nd place, silver medalist(s)						
2021	Olympic Trials		8	6	7	9	13	6	10
2022	Cairo World Cup			2nd place, silver medalist(s)			4	6	2nd place, silver medalist(s)
2022	NCAA Championships	3rd place, bronze medalist(s)	1st place, gold medalist(s)	8	17	8	1st place, gold medalist(s)	4	2nd place, silver medalist(s)
2023	U.S. Classic		3rd place, bronze medalist(s)	12	18	10	3rd place, bronze medalist(s)	12	3rd place, bronze medalist(s)
2023	U.S. National Championships		6	1st place, gold medalist(s)	7	10		23	6
2023	World Championships	3rd place, bronze medalist(s)					5		5
2024	NCAA Championships	2nd place, silver medalist(s)	4	1st place, gold medalist(s)	37	6	2nd place, silver medalist(s)	10	34
2024	U.S. National Championships		6	5	6	9		13	14
2024	Olympic Trials		4	2nd place, silver medalist(s)	3rd place, bronze medalist(s)	6	4	13	5
2024	Olympic Games	3rd place, bronze medalist(s)	14						
2025	Big Ten Championships	1st place, gold medalist(s)		5		7	5	10	
2025	NCAA Championships	1st place, gold medalist(s)	2nd place, silver medalist(s)	6	32	13	22	1st place, gold medalist(s)	6

== Awards and honors ==
Year	Award
2020	Big Ten Freshman of the Year
2021	Big Ten Gymnast of the Year
2022	Big Ten Gymnast of the Year
2023	Nissen-Emery Award
2025	National Polish-American Sports Hall of Fame-Excellence in Sports Award
