= 2013 Winter Cup =

Artistic gymnastics competition in the USA

- Venue: Las Vegas Sports Center
- Location: Las Vegas, Nevada, U.S.
- Dates: February 7—February 9, 2013

The 2013 Winter Cup was an artistic gymnastics competition held at the Las Vegas Sports Center in Las Vegas from February 7 to February 9, 2013.

== Competition ==
44 current and former collegiate gymnasts, including five members of the 2012 United States men's national gymnastics team, and thirteen members of the U.S. junior national team competed.

== Medalists ==
Event	Gold	Silver	Bronze
Senior Men
Individual all-around	Jake Dalton	Adrian de los Angeles	Danell Leyva
Floor	Jake Dalton	Adrian de los Angeles	Stacey Ervin
Pommel horse	Michael Newburger	Ty Echard	Craig Hernandez
Rings	Jake Dalton	Alexander Naddour	Adrian de los Angeles
Vault	Eddie Penev	Paul Ruggeri	Chandler Eggleston
Parallel bars	Danell Leyva	Akash Modi	Sean Melton
Horizontal bar	Danell Leyva	Paul Ruggeri	Kristofer Done
