= Shane Wiskus =

American gymnast (born 1998)

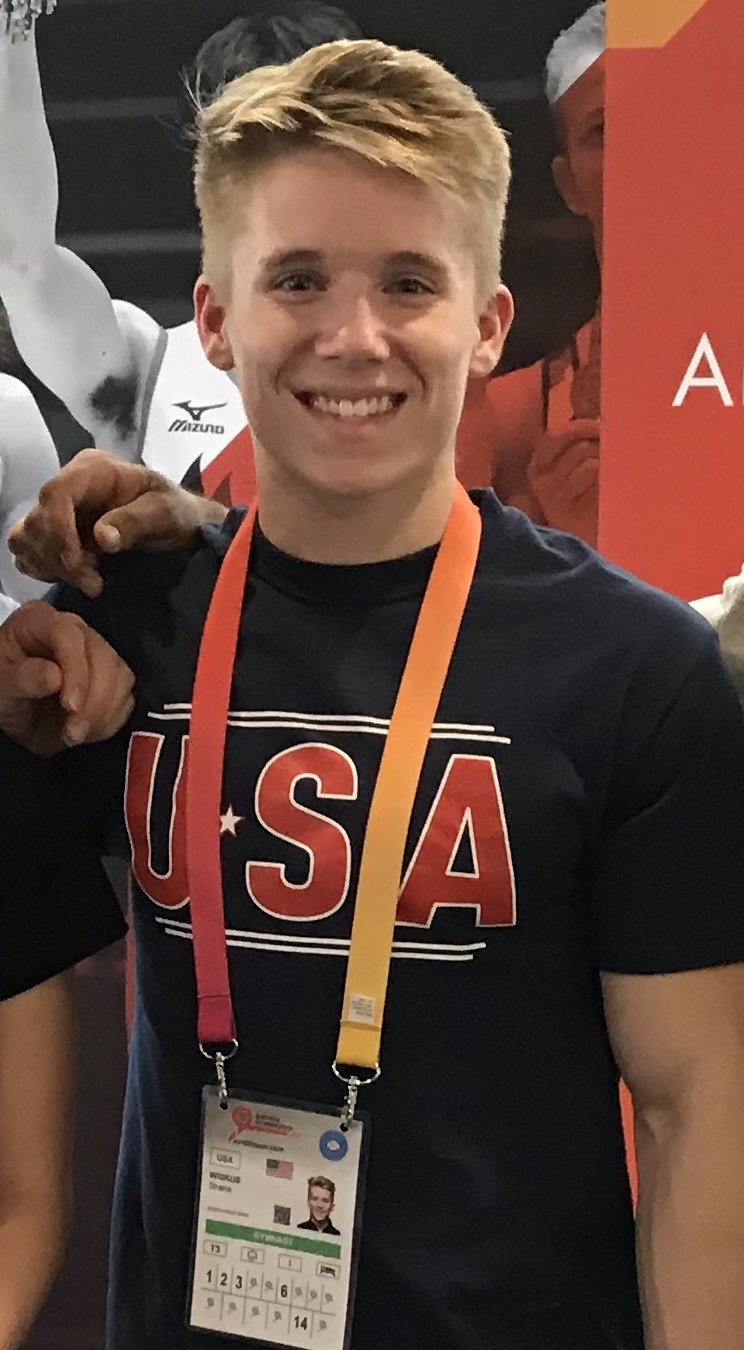
- Wiskus in 2019.

Personal information
- Full name: Shane Michael Wiskus
- Born: October 1, 1998 (age 28) Waconia, Minnesota, U.S.
- Height: 168 cm (5 ft 6 in)

Gymnastics career
- Discipline: Men's artistic gymnastics
- Country represented: United States; (2018–present)
- College team: Minnesota Golden Gophers
- Gym: EVO Gymnastics; USOTC
- Head coach: Syque Caesar
- Assistant coaches: Kevin Mazeika; Sam Mikulak
- Former coaches: Mike Burns; Kostya Kolesnikov
- Awards: Nissen-Emery Award (2021)
Medal record
Men's artistic gymnastics
Representing United States
Event	1st	2nd	3rd
Pan American Championships	2	2	1
Total	2	2	1
Pan American Championships
Gold medal – first place	2022 Rio de Janeiro	Team
Gold medal – first place	2023 Medellín	Team
Silver medal – second place	2023 Medellín	All-around
Silver medal – second place	2023 Medellín	Parallel bars
Bronze medal – third place	2023 Medellín	Floor

Shane Michael Wiskus (born October 1, 1998) is an American artistic gymnast and member of the United States men's national artistic gymnastics team. He represented the United States at the 2020 Summer Olympics and was named as an alternate for the 2024 Summer Olympics. Additionally, he represented the United States at the 2019 World Championships and is a three-time NCAA Champion.

== Early life and education ==
Wiskus was born in Waconia, Minnesota, on October 1, 1998, to Tammy and Mike Wiskus. His sister, Annabelle, was a member of the University of St Thomas dance team.

In 2002, Wiskus's mother signed him up for gymnastics classes to develop his coordination and motor skills. He began competing three years later at age seven. He attended Mound Westonka High School before enrolling at the University of Minnesota to pursue gymnastics.

== Gymnastics career ==
=== 2014–15 ===
Wiskus competed at his first elite level National Championships in 2014 and finished 11th in the all-around and fourth on the floor exercise. At the 2015 National Championships Wiskus placed second in the all-around behind Davis Grooms. Additionally, he placed first on rings, second on floor exercise, and third on parallel bars. Wiskus was later selected to represent the USA at the Olympic Hopes Cup in Liberec. While there Wiskus helped the USA placed third and individually he placed third in the all-around.

=== 2016 ===
In early 2016, Wiskus competed at the RD761 International Junior Team Cup, where he helped his team finish third. At the 2016 National Championships Wiskus won his first national all-around title. He also won gold on four apparatuses (floor exercise, vault, parallel bars, and horizontal bars) and silver on the pommel horse and rings.

=== 2017–18 ===
Wiskus turned senior in 2017. He competed at the 2017 Winter Cup and finished 11th in the all-around. He next competed at the University of Calgary International Cup, where he helped the USA finish second behind China. Individually, he won gold in the all-around. At the 2017 U.S. National Championships Wiskus finished 13th in the all-around.

In 2018, Wiskus began competing with the Minnesota Golden Gophers and was named the 2018 Big Ten Conference Freshman of the Year. In February he competed at the 2018 Winter Cup where he placed ninth in the all-around and won silver on floor exercise behind Sam Mikulak. At the 2018 NCAA National Championships Wiskus helped Minnesota finish second as a team and individually he won silver in the all-around behind Yul Moldauer. At the U.S. National Championships, Wiskus placed 19th in the all-around.

=== 2019 ===
Wiskus competed at the Winter Cup Challenge and placed 27th in the all-around. At the NCAA National Championships Wiskus placed second in the all-around behind Brody Malone. He won his first NCAA title on the parallel bars and placed sixth on vault and ninth on horizontal bar.

At the 2019 U.S. National Championships, Wiskus finished fourth in the all-around but won the national title on vault. He competed at the World Team selection trials where he placed third in the all-around behind Sam Mikulak and Akash Modi. He was added to team alongside Mikulak, Modi, Yul Moldauer, and Trevor Howard. At the World Championships Wiskus helped team USA finish fourth.

=== 2020 ===
Wiskus competed at the 2020 Winter Cup and placed second in the all-around and on the horizontal bar. He next competed at the American Cup where he placed fourth behind compatriot Sam Mikulak, Ukrainian Oleg Verniaiev, and James Hall of Great Britain. Wiskus' junior NCAA season was cut short due to the ongoing COVID-19 pandemic and the NCAA Championships were canceled. In late 2020 Wiskus competed at the Friendship & Solidarity Meet where he was on the Friendship Team who placed second.

=== 2021 ===
Wiskus returned to competition at the 2021 Winter Cup where he placed fourth in the all-around but won gold on floor exercise. At the NCAA Championships Wiskus once again place second in the all-around behind Brody Malone. However, he placed first on both rings and parallel bars and placed second on floor exercise and horizontal bar. Wiskus was awarded the 2021 Nissen Emery Award, the highest honor in college men's gymnastics for a senior gymnast.

Wiskus ended his collegiate career as a two-time Big Ten Conference Gymnast of the Year and the 2020 College Gymnastics Association Most Valuable Player. When the University of Minnesota announced they would discontinue their gymnastics program after the 2020–2021 school year, Wiskus moved to Colorado to train at the US Olympic & Paralympic Training Center to prepare for the 2020 Summer Olympics in Tokyo.

At the 2021 U.S. National Championships, Wiskus placed ninth in the all-around after falling off the horizontal bar three times on night two of the competition. He was selected to compete at the upcoming Olympic Trials. At the Olympic Trials Wiskus finished third in the all-around and was named to the team to compete at the 2020 Olympic Games alongside Brody Malone, Yul Moldauer, and Sam Mikulak.

At the Olympic Games qualification, Wiskus finished 21st in the all-around; however, he did not advance to the finals due to two-per-country limitations as Malone and Mikulak placed higher. Additionally, he finished ninth on floor exercise and was the first reserve for the final. During the team final, Wiskus helped the United States place fifth.

=== 2022 ===
Wiskus was scheduled to compete at the 2022 Winter Cup but had to withdraw due to a knee injury. In June Wiskus was selected to represent the United States at the Pan American Championships alongside Riley Loos, Brody Malone, Yul Moldauer, and Colt Walker. On the first day of competition Wiskus competed on all six events to help qualify the United States in first place to the team final. During the team final he only competed on parallel bars and horizontal bar to help the USA win gold ahead of the reigning team champion Brazil.

In August, Wiskus competed at the U.S. National Championships where he finished seventh in the all-around. Additionally he placed third on horizontal bar.

=== 2023 ===
Wiskus was selected to represent the United States at the Pan American Championships alongside Yul Moldauer, Curran Phillips, Khoi Young, and Taylor Christopulos. On the first day of competition, Wiskus helped the USA qualify for the team final. Individually, he won silver in the all-around and on parallel bars and bronze in floor exercise. On the final day of competition Wiskus helped the USA win their second consecutive team title.

In August, Wiskus competed at the Core Hydration Classic where he placed first on the horizontal bar, third on parallel bars behind Phillips and Blake Sun, and seventh on pommel horse. Wiskus next competed at the Xfinity National Championships where he placed eighth in the all-around. The following day he was named to the team to compete at the Pan American Games taking place in late October alongside Donnell Whittenburg, Colt Walker, Stephen Nedoroscik, and Cameron Bock. Wiskus later withdrew from the team due to injury and was replaced by Curran Phillips.

=== 2024 to present ===
In June, Wiskus competed at the U.S. Olympic Trials, where he placed third all-around (169.65), first on floor (28.95), sixth on pommel horse (27.25), fifth on rings (28.10), seventh on parallel bars (29.00), and second on horizontal bar (27.45). On June 29, he was named as an alternate to the U.S. Olympic Team for the 2024 Summer Olympics. In the fall Wiskus participated in the Gold Over America Tour. Following the conclusion of the tour, it was announced in January 2025 that Wiskus was scheduled to have shoulder surgery and faced a 6 to 9-month recovery period.

Wiskus returned to competition at the 2026 Winter Cup where he finished fourteenth. At the 2026 U.S. National Championships, Wiskus placed second in the all-around behind Fred Richard and received the highest two-day all-around score when removing domestic bonuses. At the conclusion of the competition, he was selected to compete at the 2026 World Championships alongside Richard, Danila Leykin, Patrick Hoopes, Kameron Nelson, and alternate Yul Moldauer.

== In popular culture ==
Wiskus is the subject of the documentary film Losing Grip.

== Competitive history ==
Wiskus (left) on the all-around podium at the 2026 U.S. National Championships

Competitive history of Shane Wiskus at the junior level
Year	Event	Team	AA	FX	PH	SR	VT	PB	HB
2014	U.S. National Championships		11	4	23	9	16	9	8
2015	U.S. National Championships		2nd place, silver medalist(s)	2nd place, silver medalist(s)	17	1st place, gold medalist(s)	4	3rd place, bronze medalist(s)	16
2015	Olympic Hopes Cup	3rd place, bronze medalist(s)	3rd place, bronze medalist(s)						
2016	RD761 International Junior Team Cup	3rd place, bronze medalist(s)		4				7	4
2016	International Junior Team Cup		3rd place, bronze medalist(s)						
2016	U.S. National Championships		1st place, gold medalist(s)	1st place, gold medalist(s)	2nd place, silver medalist(s)	2nd place, silver medalist(s)	1st place, gold medalist(s)	1st place, gold medalist(s)	1st place, gold medalist(s)

Competitive history of Shane Wiskus at the senior level
Year	Event	Team	AA	FX	PH	SR	VT	PB	HB
2017	Winter Cup		12	20	19	14	7	8	30
2017	Elite Team Cup	8	2nd place, silver medalist(s)						
2017	University of Calgary International Cup	2nd place, silver medalist(s)	1st place, gold medalist(s)	2nd place, silver medalist(s)		3rd place, bronze medalist(s)	4	2nd place, silver medalist(s)	4
2017	U.S. National Championships		13	15	16	15	14	18	9
2018	Winter Cup		9	2nd place, silver medalist(s)	19	6	19	5	4
2018	NCAA Championships	2nd place, silver medalist(s)	2nd place, silver medalist(s)			4			7
2018	U.S. National Championships		19	16	24	13	19	21	7
2019	Winter Cup		27						
2019	NCAA Championships		2nd place, silver medalist(s)	20	21	13	6	1st place, gold medalist(s)	9
2019	U.S. National Championships		4	5	9	8	1st place, gold medalist(s)	3rd place, bronze medalist(s)	5
2019	World Championship Trials		3rd place, bronze medalist(s)						
2019	World Championships	4							
2020	Winter Cup		2nd place, silver medalist(s)	8			2nd place, silver medalist(s)		7
2020	American Cup		4						
2020	Friendship & Solidarity Meet	2nd place, silver medalist(s)							
2021	Winter Cup		4	1st place, gold medalist(s)	13	3rd place, bronze medalist(s)	3rd place, bronze medalist(s)	2nd place, silver medalist(s)	2nd place, silver medalist(s)
2021	NCAA Championships	5	2nd place, silver medalist(s)	2nd place, silver medalist(s)	8	1st place, gold medalist(s)		1st place, gold medalist(s)	2nd place, silver medalist(s)
2021	U.S. National Championships		9	4	9	6	24	2nd place, silver medalist(s)	25
2021	Olympic Trials		3rd place, bronze medalist(s)	8	11	5	5	2nd place, silver medalist(s)	3rd place, bronze medalist(s)
2021	Olympic Games	5							
2022
2022	Pan American Championships	1st place, gold medalist(s)							4
2022	U.S. Classic		8	26	22	6	5	6	3rd place, bronze medalist(s)
2022	U.S. National Championships		7	19	10	8	12	4	3rd place, bronze medalist(s)
2023	Winter Cup		5	2nd place, silver medalist(s)	16	3rd place, bronze medalist(s)		3rd place, bronze medalist(s)	6
2023	DTB Pokal Team Challenge	1st place, gold medalist(s)							
2023	Pan American Championships	1st place, gold medalist(s)	2nd place, silver medalist(s)	3rd place, bronze medalist(s)				2nd place, silver medalist(s)	
2023	U.S. Classic				7			3rd place, bronze medalist(s)	1st place, gold medalist(s)
2023	U.S. National Championships		8	4	14	11		10	15
2024	Winter Cup		2nd place, silver medalist(s)	3rd place, bronze medalist(s)	16	6		4	3rd place, bronze medalist(s)
2024	DTB Pokal Team Challenge	1st place, gold medalist(s)							5
2024	U.S. National Championships		5	4	10	14		6	7
2024	Olympic Trials		3rd place, bronze medalist(s)	1st place, gold medalist(s)	6	5		7	2nd place, silver medalist(s)
2026	Winter Cup		14	19	20	10		23	30
2026	National Qualifier		1st place, gold medalist(s)	1st place, gold medalist(s)	5	3rd place, bronze medalist(s)		1st place, gold medalist(s)	2nd place, silver medalist(s)
2026	U.S. National Championships		2nd place, silver medalist(s)	6	10	5		4	6
2026	World Championships	6							
