= Donnell Whittenburg =

American artistic gymnast

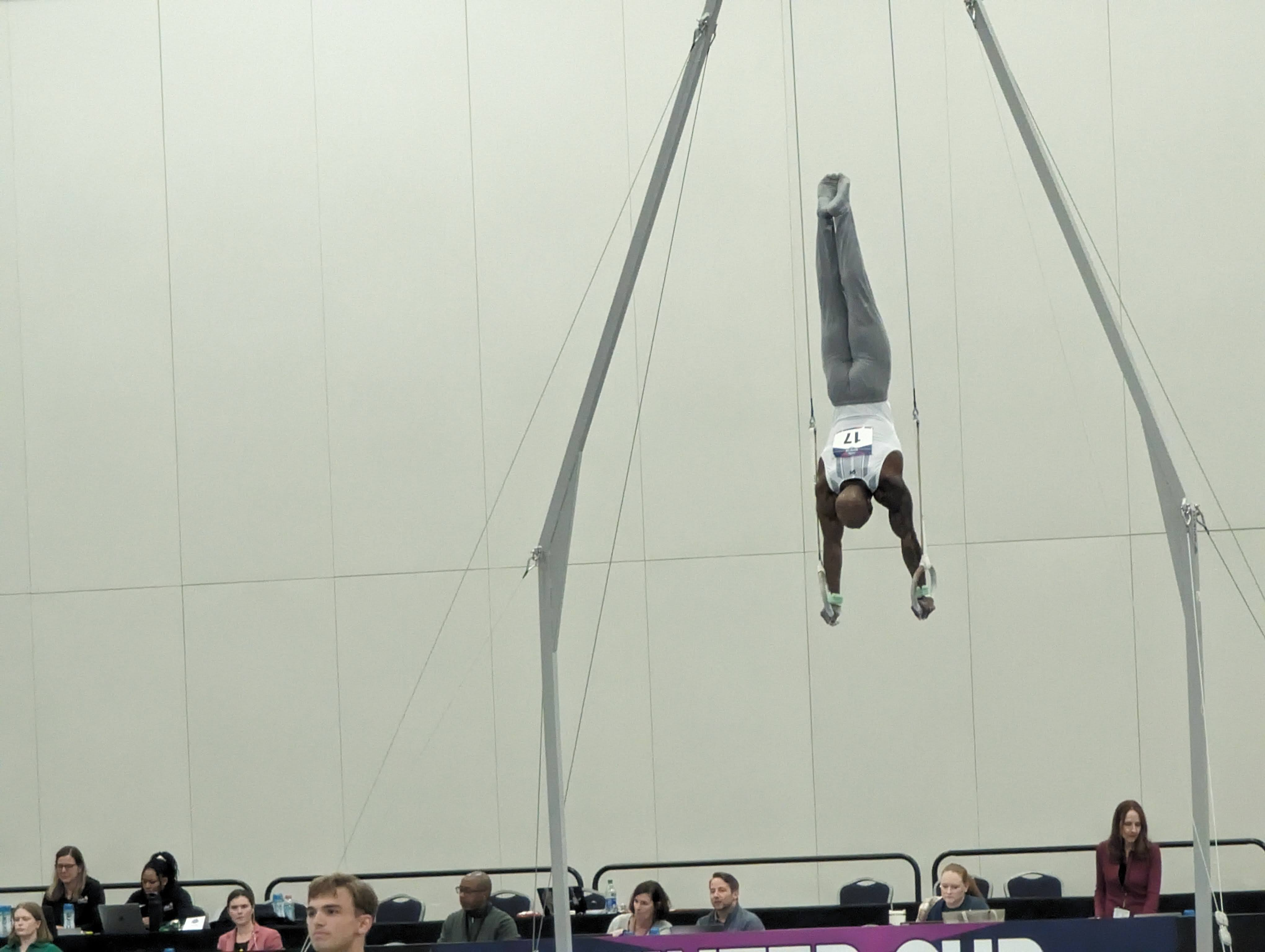
- Whittenburg at the 2024 Winter Cup

Personal information
- Full name: Donnell Jarron Whittenburg
- Born: August 18, 1994 (age 32) Baltimore, Maryland, U.S.
- Height: 5 ft 4 in (163 cm)

Gymnastics career
- Discipline: Men's artistic gymnastics
- Country represented: United States; (2013–present)
- Gym: EVO Gymnastics; Salto Gymnastics Center; USOTC; Team Hilton
- Head coach: Anthony Ingrelli
- Former coaches: Vitaly Marinich, Abdul Mammeri
- Eponymous skills: Whittenburg (still rings)
Medal record
Men's artistic gymnastics
Representing United States
Event	1st	2nd	3rd
World Championships	1	0	2
Pan American Games	3	3	1
Pacific Rim Championships	3	2	0
Pan American Championships	0	1	0
Total	7	6	3
World Championships
Gold medal – first place	2025 Jakarta	Rings
Bronze medal – third place	2014 Nanning	Team
Bronze medal – third place	2015 Glasgow	Vault
Pan American Games
Gold medal – first place	2015 Toronto	Team
Gold medal – first place	2023 Santiago	Team
Gold medal – first place	2023 Santiago	Rings
Silver medal – second place	2015 Toronto	Floor
Silver medal – second place	2015 Toronto	Rings
Silver medal – second place	2015 Toronto	Vault
Bronze medal – third place	2023 Santiago	All-around
Pan American Championships
Silver medal – second place	2021 Rio de Janeiro	Team
Pacific Rim Championships
Gold medal – first place	2016 Everett	Team
Gold medal – first place	2016 Everett	Rings
Gold medal – first place	2016 Everett	Parallel bars
Silver medal – second place	2016 Everett	All-around
Silver medal – second place	2016 Everett	Vault
FIG World Cup
Event	1st	2nd	3rd
All-Around World Cup	0	2	0
World Challenge Cup	1	3	2
Total	1	5	2

Donnell Jarron Whittenburg (born August 18, 1994) is an American artistic gymnast. He is the 2025 World Champion on rings and is a member of the United States men's national artistic gymnastics team.

== Early life and education ==
Whittenburg was born on August 18, 1994, in Baltimore, Maryland. He attended Edgewood High School and later a local community college and DeVry University. He was coached as a youth by Abdul Mammeri. He decided to pursue gymnastics and moved to Colorado to attend the United States Olympic Training Center under Vitaly Marinich.

== Gymnastics career ==
=== 2014–2016 ===
Whittenburg was the 2014 U.S. national champion on vault and silver medalist on rings. He won a bronze medal with the team at the 2014 World Championships.

Whittenburg competed at the 2015 Pan American Games where he won gold with the team. Individually he won silver on floor exericse, rings, and vault. The following month he competed at the 2015 National Championships where he won the national title on rings. At the 2015 World Artistic Gymnastics Championships, Whittenburg won his first individual World Championships medal, a bronze on vault, with an average combined score of 15.350 behind Ri Se Gwang of North Korea (15.450) and Marian Drăgulescu of Romania (15.400). He also qualified for the still rings final but finished eighth with a score of 15.300.

At the 2016 American Cup Whittenburg placed second behind Ryōhei Katō. He retained his national title on rings at the 2016 National Championships. At the 2016 Olympic trials he placed second on rings and vault and third on parallel bars and horizontal bar. Whittenburg was named as an alternate for the 2016 Olympic team.

=== 2017–2021 ===
Whittenburg won silver at the 2017 London World Cup behind Oleg Verniaiev. At the 2017 Koper World Challenge Cup he won gold on parallel bars and silver on floor exercise and vault. At the 2017 World Championships he placed sixth on floor exercise.

At the 2021 Pan American Championships Whittenburg won a silver medal with the team. He competed at the postponed 2020 Olympic trials but was ultimately not named to the Olympic team. Whittenburg competed at the 2021 World Championships but did not qualify to any event finals.

=== 2022–2024 ===
In 2022, Whittenburg placed second at the United States National Championships behind Brody Malone, scoring highest on rings and second highest on vault. At the 2022 Paris World Challenge Cup, he won a bronze medal on parallel bars and rings. He competed at the 2022 World Championships where he helped the United States finish fifth. Individually he finished eighth on rings.

Whittenburg competed at the 2023 Pan American Games where he helped the United States win team gold. Individually he won gold on rings and bronze in the all-around behind Félix Dolci and Diogo Soares.

In 2024, Whittenburg placed seventh in the all-around at the 2024 U.S. National Gymnastics Championships and 2024 United States Olympic trials and was named as a non-traveling replacement athlete for the 2024 Olympic team.

=== 2025–present ===
Whittenburg changed gyms to EVO Gymnastics in 2025 and was a member of their delegation at the 2025 U.S. National Championships. There he won bronze on rings and parallel bars. After the competition, he was selected to compete at the 2025 World Championships alongside Brandon Dang, Asher Hong, Patrick Hoopes, Brody Malone, and Kameron Nelson.

At the World Championships, Whittenburg qualified for the rings and parallel bars finals. During the rings final, Whittenburg won gold ahead of 2022 World Champion Adem Asil and 2021 World Champion Lan Xingyu. In doing so, Whittenburg became the first American to win the World title on rings. At age 31 and 61 days, Whittenburg also became the oldest American man to win a World title, surpassing Kurt Thomas, who won two golds in 1979 at age 23 and 254 days, as well as the oldest American man to win a World Championships medal, surpassing Paul O'Neill (28 years and 354 days in 1994).

Whittenburg was selected to represent the United States at the 2026 Pan American Championships as a traveling replacement athlete. A week before leaving for Brazil, he injured himself on rings and withdrew; he was replaced by Brandon Dang. Whittenburg later revealed that he partially tore his bicep and rotator cuff. As a result he could not compete at the 2026 National Championships nor the 2026 World Championships.

== Eponymous skills ==
Whittenburg has one named element on the rings.

Gymnastics elements named after Donnell Whittenburg
Apparatus	Name	Description	Difficulty (Note: Valid for the 2025–2028 Code of Points)	Added to Code of Points
Rings	Whittenburg	Triple salto backward piked	I, 0.9	2017 Koper World Challenge Cup

== Competitive history ==
Competitive history of Donnell Whittenburg at the junior level
Year	Event	Team	AA	FX	PH	SR	VT	PB	HB
2010	U.S. Championships (14–15)		10	11	20	6	3rd place, bronze medalist(s)	12	5
2011	U.S. Championships (16–18)		6	11	17	2nd place, silver medalist(s)	4	6	4
2012	Winter Cup		21	9	35	13	25	32	28
2012	U.S. Championships (16–18)		1st place, gold medalist(s)	5	6	1st place, gold medalist(s)	2nd place, silver medalist(s)	2nd place, silver medalist(s)	3rd place, bronze medalist(s)
2012	Mexican Open		6						

Competitive history of Donnell Whittenburg at the senior level
Year	Event	Team	AA	FX	PH	SR	VT	PB	HB
2013	Winter Cup		11	17	30	7	6	16	25
2013	National Qualifier		2nd place, silver medalist(s)		3rd place, bronze medalist(s)	1st place, gold medalist(s)	11	2nd place, silver medalist(s)	7
2013	U.S. Championships		13	24	17	6	7	8	24
2013	DTB Pokal Team Cup	5							
2014	Winter Cup		2nd place, silver medalist(s)	6	20	2nd place, silver medalist(s)	4	7	10
2014	Doha World Challenge Cup							4	
2014	National Qualifier		1st place, gold medalist(s)	2nd place, silver medalist(s)	5	3rd place, bronze medalist(s)	1st place, gold medalist(s)	21	13
2014	U.S. Championships		4	7	14	2nd place, silver medalist(s)	1st place, gold medalist(s)	6	11
2014	World Championships	3rd place, bronze medalist(s)	17					7	
2014	Stuttgart World Cup		3rd place, bronze medalist(s)						
2015	Winter Cup		3rd place, bronze medalist(s)	5	21	4	14	2nd place, silver medalist(s)	13
2015	American Cup		3rd place, bronze medalist(s)						
2015	Pan American Games	1st place, gold medalist(s)	4	2nd place, silver medalist(s)		2nd place, silver medalist(s)	2nd place, silver medalist(s)		
2015	U.S. Championships		2nd place, silver medalist(s)	2nd place, silver medalist(s)	8	1st place, gold medalist(s)	3rd place, bronze medalist(s)	9	26
2015	World Championships	5	8			8	3rd place, bronze medalist(s)		
2016	Winter Cup		6	32	17	1st place, gold medalist(s)	3rd place, bronze medalist(s)	10	12
2016	American Cup		2nd place, silver medalist(s)						
2016	Pacific Rim Championships	1st place, gold medalist(s)	2nd place, silver medalist(s)			1st place, gold medalist(s)	2nd place, silver medalist(s)	1st place, gold medalist(s)	6
2016	U.S. Championships		5	11	25	1st place, gold medalist(s)	4	5	12
2016	Olympic Trials		4	8	14	2nd place, silver medalist(s)	2nd place, silver medalist(s)	3rd place, bronze medalist(s)	12
2017	Winter Cup		4	4	14	3rd place, bronze medalist(s)	13	5	7
2017	London World Cup		2nd place, silver medalist(s)						
2017	Koper World Challenge Cup			2nd place, silver medalist(s)		4	2nd place, silver medalist(s)	1st place, gold medalist(s)	
2017	U.S. Championships		3rd place, bronze medalist(s)	11	10	3rd place, bronze medalist(s)	1st place, gold medalist(s)	3rd place, bronze medalist(s)	1
2017	World Championships			6		R2		R1	
2018	U.S. Championships					5		9	
2019	National Qualifier				12	1st place, gold medalist(s)		6	22
2019	U.S. Championships		7	7	14	3rd place, bronze medalist(s)	7	11	16
2021	Winter Cup		11	4	21	2nd place, silver medalist(s)	11	10	
2021	Pan American Championships	2nd place, silver medalist(s)							
2021	Olympic Trials			14		3rd place, bronze medalist(s)	1st place, gold medalist(s)		
2021	World Championships			30			12		
2022	U.S. Classic		3rd place, bronze medalist(s)	2nd place, silver medalist(s)	20	1st place, gold medalist(s)	1st place, gold medalist(s)	13	23
2022	U.S. Championships		2nd place, silver medalist(s)	5	14	1st place, gold medalist(s)	2nd place, silver medalist(s)	10	8
2022	Paris World Challenge Cup					3rd place, bronze medalist(s)		3rd place, bronze medalist(s)	
2022	World Championships	5				8			
2023	U.S. Classic		7	10	65	2nd place, silver medalist(s)	13	9	16
2023	U.S. Championships		7	3rd place, bronze medalist(s)	25	1st place, gold medalist(s)		18	13
2023	Pan American Games	1st place, gold medalist(s)	3rd place, bronze medalist(s)	6		1st place, gold medalist(s)			
2024	Winter Cup		5	4	19	2nd place, silver medalist(s)		6	16
2024	U.S. Championships		7	7	13	4	1st place, gold medalist(s)	8	22
2024	Olympic Trials		7	5	15	3rd place, bronze medalist(s)		11	12
2025	U.S. National Championships					3rd place, bronze medalist(s)		3rd place, bronze medalist(s)	8
2025	World Championships	—N/a				1st place, gold medalist(s)		5	
2026	Osijek World Cup					5		2nd place, silver medalist(s)	
