= Fred Richard =

American gymnast (born 2004)

- Richard at the 2026 U.S. National Championships

Personal information
- Full name: Frederick Nathaniel Richard
- Born: April 23, 2004 (age 22) Boston, Massachusetts, U.S.
- Height: 5 ft 5 in (165 cm)

Gymnastics career
- Discipline: Men's artistic gymnastics
- Country represented: United States; (2022–present)
- College team: Michigan Wolverines
- Gym: Massachusetts Elite Gymnastics Academy
- Head coach: Yuan Xiao
- Former coaches: Levon Karakhanyan; Tom Fontecchio
- Awards: Nissen-Emery Award (2026)
Medal record
Men's artistic gymnastics
Representing United States
Event	1st	2nd	3rd
Olympic Games	0	0	1
World Championships	1	0	2
Total	1	0	3
Olympic Games
Bronze medal – third place	2024 Paris	Team
World Championships
Gold medal – first place	2026 Rotterdam	Floor exercise
Bronze medal – third place	2023 Antwerp	Team
Bronze medal – third place	2023 Antwerp	All-around

Instagram information
- Page: frederickFlips
- Followers: 926k

TikTok information
- Page: frederickflips
- Followers: 972.3K

YouTube information
- Channel: FrederickFlips
- Genres: Sport; vlogging
- Subscribers: 481K
- Views: 520,802,404
- Last updated: October 24, 2026

Frederick Nathaniel Richard (born April 23, 2004) is an American artistic gymnast. He is the 2026 World floor exercise champion and the 2023 World all-around bronze medalist. He has been a member of the United States men's national artistic gymnastics team since 2022 and represented the United States at the 2024 Summer Olympics, winning a bronze medal in the team event. Richard is also a 6 time NCAA champion competing for the Michigan Wolverines.

== Early life and education ==
Richard was born on April 23, 2004, in Boston. His father, Carl, is Haitian and his mother, Ann-Marie Richard, is from Dominica. He has two brothers and a sister: Carlton, Alexandra, and Kevin.

He began gymnastics at age four. He was affiliated with Massachusetts Elite Gymnastics Academy and attended Stoughton High School in Stoughton, Massachusetts. He continued to pursue gymnastics as an athlete at the University of Michigan in Ann Arbor while a student there.

== Gymnastics career ==
=== 2019–20 ===
Richard competed in his first elite-level National Championships in Kansas City, Missouri in 2019. He placed eighth in the all-around but won bronze on floor exercise behind Nick Kuebler and Khoi Young. He was added to the junior national team for the first time. In 2020 Richard competed at the Elite Team Cup and the Winter Cup in Las Vegas. He finished third at the latter behind Fuzzy Benas and Asher Hong. The majority of competitions for the rest of the year were canceled or postponed due to the global COVID-19 pandemic.

=== 2021 ===
Richard returned to competition at the 2021 National Championships in Fort Worth, Texas where he won the junior all-around title. He was named to the team to compete at the Junior Pan American Championships in Guadalajara, Mexico. He and the U.S. team won gold in the team event. He won gold in the all-around and on vault and horizontal bar. Additionally, he won silver on floor exercise and bronze on rings.

=== 2022 ===
Richard became age-eligible to compete at the senior level in 2022 but remained at the junior level in international competition. He competed at the DTB Pokal Team Challenge in Stuttgart, Germany, finishing first with the U.S. in the team competition. Individually, he won gold on vault and parallel bars and placed fifth on floor exercise. Later in 2022, Richard competed at the Pan American Championships in Rio de Janeiro, Brazil where he again led the United States to team gold and individually won the all-around competition. During event finals he won gold on floor exercise, rings, and vault, silver on parallel bars, and bronze on pommel horse.

Although he competed at the junior level internationally, Richard competed in the senior division in domestic competitions. He competed in three events at the U.S. Classic in West Valley City, Utah, before competing in the all-around at the 2022 National Championships in Tampa, Florida. While there, he finished fourth in the all-around, third on floor exercise, and second on horizontal bar. As a result he was added to the senior national team.

=== 2023 ===
Richard began competing for the Michigan Wolverines in the 2022–2023 season. He was selected to represent the United States at the DTB Pokal Team Challenge in Stuttgart alongside Yul Moldauer, Asher Hong, Brody Malone, and Shane Wiskus. They placed first as a team.

In August, Richard competed at the World University Games in Chengdu, China, and Team USA finished fourth in the team event. Individually, he qualified for the all-around and horizontal bar finals. He finished fourth in the all-around final and seventh in the horizontal bar final. Richard next competed at the Xfinity National Championships in San Jose, California, where he placed third all-around behind Hong and Khoi Young. The next day he was named to the team to compete at the 2023 World Artistic Gymnastics Championships in Antwerp, Belgium alongside Hong, Young, Moldauer, Paul Juda, and alternate Colt Walker.

At the World Championships, Richard competed in four events, leading Team USA to a bronze-medal finish. In the all-around competition, he earned the bronze medal behind Daiki Hashimoto of Japan and Illia Kovtun of Ukraine. Richard is the youngest USA gymnast to win an individual world medal in the men's competition, and the USA's first men's all-around medalist since 2010.

=== 2024 ===
During the 2024 NCAA men's gymnastics championship in Columbus, Ohio, Richard finished second on still rings with a score of 14.400 and second in the all-around with a score of 83.999 which helped Michigan finish as runner-up in the team competition. At the 2024 National Championships in Fort Worth, he finished second in the all-around behind Brody Malone.

In June, Richard competed at the U.S. Olympic Trials in Minneapolis, Minnesota, where he placed first all-around (170.500), third on floor (28.700), ninth on pommel horse (27.050), seventh on rings (27.650), second on parallel bars (29.850), and first on horizontal bar (28.850). After placing first in the all-around and in the top three for three events, Richard was automatically named to the U.S. Olympic Team to compete at the 2024 Olympic Games in Paris alongside Malone, Asher Hong, Paul Juda, and Stephen Nedoroscik.

During the qualification round, Richard competed on all apparatuses, helping the USA qualify to the team final in fifth place; individually, he qualified for the all-around final in tenth place and was the third reserve for the horizontal bar final. During the team final, he contributed scores on floor exercise, rings, parallel bars, and horizontal bar towards the USA's bronze medal finish. In the all-around final, Richard finished in fifteenth place after shaky performances on pommel horse and floor exercise. In September 2024, he embarked on the Gold Over America Tour.

=== 2025 ===
During the 2025 NCAA men's gymnastics championship in Ann Arbor, Michigan, Richard won the all-around title with a score of 84.264, and tied for second on the high bar with a score of 13.766. He helped Michigan win their seventh NCAA men's gymnastics championships team title.

=== 2026 ===
Richard competing at the 2026 U.S. National Championships

Richard competed at the 2026 Winter Cup where he placed first in the all-around. In April, he competed at the NCAA Championships where he helped Michigan place third. Individually, he won his third NCAA all-around title.

At the 2026 U.S. National Championships, Richard won his first national all-around title. At the conclusion of the competition, he was selected to compete at the 2026 World Championships alongside Shane Wiskus, Danila Leykin, Patrick Hoopes, Kameron Nelson, and alternate Yul Moldauer. At the World Championships, Richard helped the United States finish sixth as a team. Individually he finished ninth in the all-around. During his only event final, he won gold on floor exercise. In doing so, he became the third American male gymnast to win the World title on floor exercise after Kurt Thomas (1978, 1979) and Paul Hamm (2003).

== Personal life ==
Richard creates TikTok, Instagram, and YouTube content related to gymnastics training and athletic challenges under the name FrederickFlips. He began posting on TikTok during the initial COVID-19 lockdowns in April 2020. As of May 2024, he had 900,000 followers on his TikTok and Instagram accounts. He was honored by Time as being one of the world's most influential people (the Time 100) in October 2024.

He sells a line of apparel under his name for adults and children and has worked with brands including Crocs, Celsius, Marriott International, and Peloton. Richard and his family are Catholic.

== Competitive history ==
Richard (center) on the all-around podium at the 2026 U.S. National Championships

Competitive history of Frederick Richard at the junior level
Year	Event	Team	AA	FX	PH	SR	VT	PB	HB
2019	U.S. National Championships (15–16)		8	3rd place, bronze medalist(s)	5	16	18	4	4
2020	Elite Team Cup	2nd place, silver medalist(s)							
2020	Winter Cup		3rd place, bronze medalist(s)	2nd place, silver medalist(s)	8	6	6	8	1st place, gold medalist(s)
2021	U.S. National Championships (17–18)		1st place, gold medalist(s)	1st place, gold medalist(s)	7	2nd place, silver medalist(s)	1st place, gold medalist(s)	7	1st place, gold medalist(s)
2021	Pan American Championships	1st place, gold medalist(s)	1st place, gold medalist(s)	2nd place, silver medalist(s)	4	3rd place, bronze medalist(s)	1st place, gold medalist(s)	7	1st place, gold medalist(s)
2022	DTB Pokal Team Challenge	1st place, gold medalist(s)		5			1st place, gold medalist(s)	1st place, gold medalist(s)	
2022	Pan American Championships	1st place, gold medalist(s)	1st place, gold medalist(s)	1st place, gold medalist(s)	3rd place, bronze medalist(s)	1st place, gold medalist(s)	1st place, gold medalist(s)	2nd place, silver medalist(s)	4

Competitive history of Frederick Richard at the senior level
Year	Event	Team	AA	FX	PH	SR	VT	PB	HB
2022	Winter Cup		28	22	19	25	18	24	17
2022	U.S. Classic				15			8	2nd place, silver medalist(s)
2022	U.S. National Championships		4	3rd place, bronze medalist(s)	9	12	16	8	2nd place, silver medalist(s)
2023	Winter Cup		2nd place, silver medalist(s)						
2023	DTB Pokal Team Challenge	1st place, gold medalist(s)						5	
2023	NCAA Championships	2nd place, silver medalist(s)	1st place, gold medalist(s)	2nd place, silver medalist(s)	33	5	19	1st place, gold medalist(s)	1st place, gold medalist(s)
2023	World University Games	4	4						7
2023	U.S. National Championships		3rd place, bronze medalist(s)	7	17	9		8	1st place, gold medalist(s)
2023	World Championships	3rd place, bronze medalist(s)	3rd place, bronze medalist(s)	8					
2024	NCAA Championships	2nd place, silver medalist(s)	2nd place, silver medalist(s)	23	9	2nd place, silver medalist(s)	25	12	30
2024	U.S. National Championships		2nd place, silver medalist(s)	1st place, gold medalist(s)	14	6		9	2nd place, silver medalist(s)
2024	Olympic Trials		1st place, gold medalist(s)	3rd place, bronze medalist(s)	9	7		2nd place, silver medalist(s)	1st place, gold medalist(s)
2024	Olympic Games	3rd place, bronze medalist(s)	15						R3
2025	Winter Cup		2nd place, silver medalist(s)	5	12	6		3rd place, bronze medalist(s)	3rd place, bronze medalist(s)
2025	NCAA Championships	1st place, gold medalist(s)	1st place, gold medalist(s)	5	5	5	4	6	2nd place, silver medalist(s)
2025	U.S. National Championships		2nd place, silver medalist(s)	6	19	8		15	3rd place, bronze medalist(s)
2026	Winter Cup		1st place, gold medalist(s)	1st place, gold medalist(s)	3rd place, bronze medalist(s)	3rd place, bronze medalist(s)		4	3rd place, bronze medalist(s)
2026	NCAA Championships	3rd place, bronze medalist(s)	1st place, gold medalist(s)	2nd place, silver medalist(s)	7	5	18	2nd place, silver medalist(s)	20
2026	U.S. National Championships		1st place, gold medalist(s)	1st place, gold medalist(s)	7	6		6	4
2026	World Championships	6	9	1st place, gold medalist(s)					
