= 2017 Winter Cup =

Artistic gymnastics competition in the USA

- Venue: Westgate Las Vegas
- Location: Las Vegas, Nevada, U.S.
- Dates: February 16—February 18, 2017

The 2017 Winter Cup was an artistic gymnastics competition held at the Westgate Las Vegas in Las Vegas from February 16 to February 18, 2017.

== Competition ==
The competition had junior and senior gymnasts competing in the same field. The finals session featured the top 42 gymnasts according to their all-around ranking and the top three gymnasts on each apparatus. The all-around and individual event champions were determined via a combined two-day score. Performances at the Winter Cup helped determine the 15 men who comprised the United States men's national gymnastics team at the 2017 U.S. National Gymnastics Championships.

== Medalists ==
Event	Gold	Silver	Bronze
Senior Men'
Individual all-around	Yul Moldauer	Akash Modi	Allan Bower
Floor	Eddie Penev	Yul Moldauer	Akash Modi
Pommel horse	Alexander Naddour	Brandon Ngai	Allan Bower
Rings	Yul Moldauer	Alexander Naddour	Donnell Whittenburg
Vault	Anthony McCallum	Yul Moldauer	Emyre Cole
Parallel bars	Yul Moldauer	Akash Modi	Sean Melton
Horizontal bar	Chris Brooks	Akash Modi	Donothan Bailey; Grant Breckenridge
