= Brody Malone =

American gymnast (born 2000)

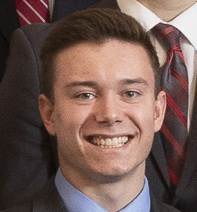
- Malone in 2019

Personal information
- Full name: John Brody Malone
- Born: January 7, 2000 (age 26) Johnson City, Tennessee, U.S.
- Height: 5 ft 6 in (168 cm)
- Spouse: Serena Ortiz (m. 2025)

Gymnastics career
- Discipline: Men's artistic gymnastics
- Country represented: United States; (2020–2026)
- College team: Stanford Cardinal
- Gym: EVO Gymnastics; Cartersville Twisters Gymnastics
- Head coach: Syque Caesar
- Assistant coaches: Kevin Mazeika, Sam Mikulak
- Former coaches: Thom Glielmi, Yuri Kouznetsov
- Eponymous skills: Malone (parallel bars)
- Awards: Nissen-Emery Award (2022)
Medal record
Men's artistic gymnastics
Representing United States
Event	1st	2nd	3rd
Olympic Games	0	0	1
World Championships	2	0	1
Pan American Games	0	1	0
Pan American Championships	2	0	0
Total	4	1	2
Olympic Games
Bronze medal – third place	2024 Paris	Team
World Championships
Gold medal – first place	2022 Liverpool	Horizontal bar
Gold medal – first place	2025 Jakarta	Horizontal bar
Bronze medal – third place	2021 Kitakyushu	Horizontal bar
Pan American Games
Silver medal – second place	2019 Lima	Team
Pan American Championships
Gold medal – first place	2022 Rio de Janeiro	Team
Gold medal – first place	2022 Rio de Janeiro	Horizontal bar
FIG World Cup
Event	1st	2nd	3rd
Apparatus World Cup	1	0	2
World Challenge Cup	1	1	0
Total	2	1	2

John Brody Malone (born January 7, 2000) is an American artistic gymnast. He has been a member of the United States men's national artistic gymnastics team since 2020 and represented the United States at the 2020 and 2024 Olympic Games. He was a member of the bronze medal-winning team at the 2024 Summer Olympics. He is a three-time United States national all-around champion (2021, 2022, and 2024). On horizontal bar, he is the 2022 World Champion, the 2025 World Champion, and the 2021 World Championship bronze medalist. With four Olympic and World Championship medals, Malone is the sixth most decorated U.S. male gymnast of all time. He is also a ten-time NCAA National Champion.

== Early life and education ==
Malone was born in Johnson City, Tennessee, on January 7, 2000, to John and Tracy Malone. He has two brothers and one sister. Malone's parents enrolled him in gymnastics at age three because he was a very active child. Malone's mother died of cancer in 2012, and his step-mother died in 2019 after suffering a brain aneurysm. Throughout middle school and high school Malone competed in rodeo events such as team roping and jackpots, similar to his father, who competed in rodeo at Georgia Southern University.

Malone attended Trion High School and later graduated from Stanford University with a degree in management science and engineering.

== Gymnastics career ==
=== 2015–16 ===
Malone competed at the Junior Olympic level. At the 2015 National Championships, he placed seventh. At the 2016 National Championships he placed second behind Vitaliy Guimaraes. Additionally, Malone won silver on vault and parallel bars and bronze on rings.

In 2016, Malone competed at his first elite National Championships. He placed 15th in the all-around but won bronze on the horizontal bar in the 15–16 age division.

=== 2017–18 ===
Malone competed at the 2017 Junior Olympic National Championships where he won silver in the all-around behind Bennet Huang. He next competed at the 2017 U.S. National Championships. After two days of competition, Malone won the all-around competition. He also won gold on floor exercise, pommel horse, parallel bars, and horizontal bar. Malone was later selected to represent the US at the International Junior Gymnastics Competition in Japan. While there he placed fourth in the all-around but won silver on horizontal bar.

In January 2018, Malone competed at the RD761 International Junior Team Cup, where he helped the U.S. finish third in the team competition. Individually, he finished sixth in the all-around and won silver on horizontal bar and third on rings.

=== 2019 ===
Malone began competing for the Stanford Cardinal gymnastics team in 2019. At the NCAA National Championships, Malone helped Stanford win the team title and individually won the all-around, floor exercise, and horizontal bar titles. Malone was selected to represent the United States at the 2019 Pan American Games where he helped the U.S. finish second as a team behind Brazil.

=== 2020–21 ===
In early 2020, Malone competed at the Winter Cup and finished third in the all-around. The NCAA season was cut short due to the ongoing COVID-19 pandemic.

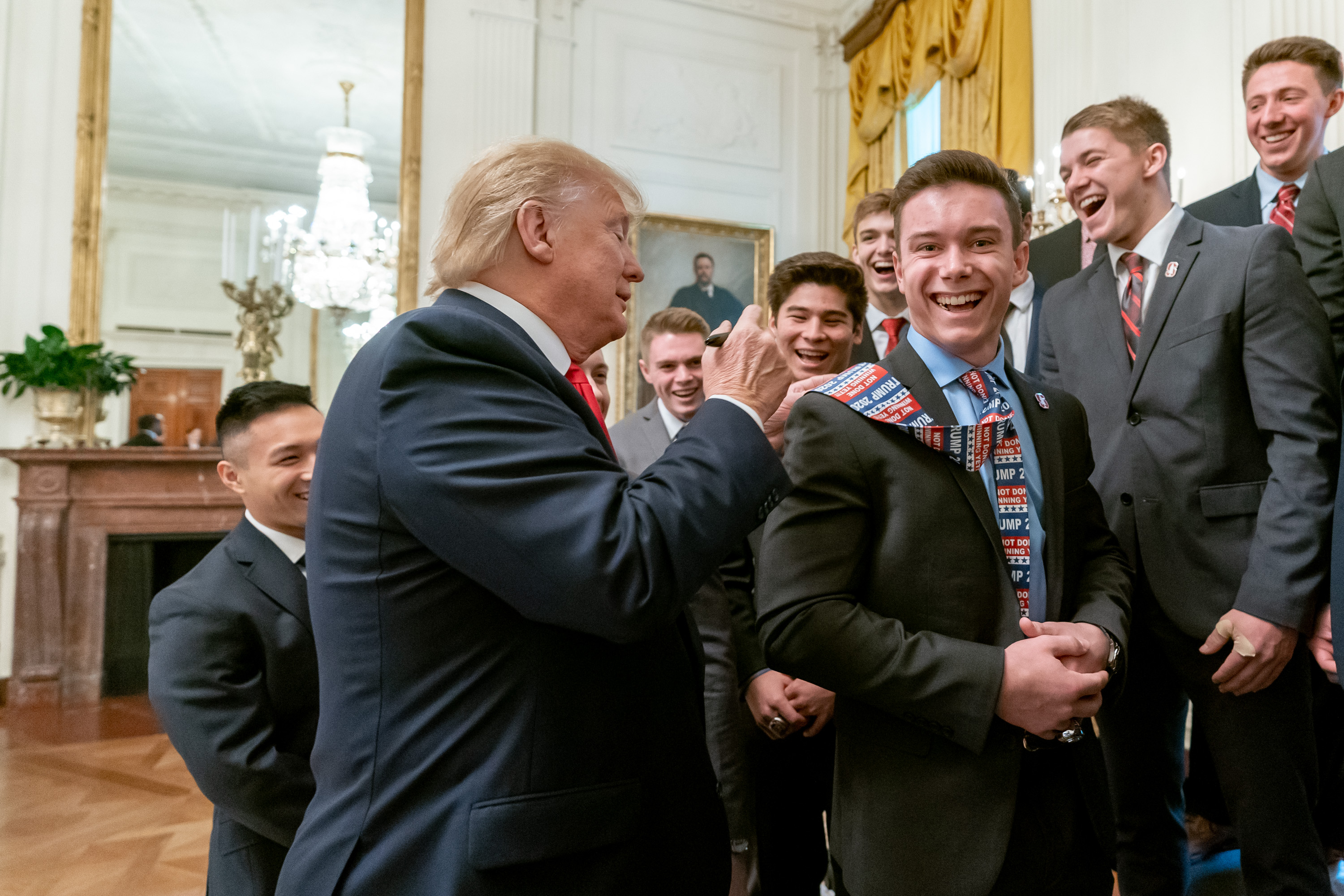
President Donald Trump signs Malone's tie during the 2019 NCAA Collegiate National Champions Day at the White House.

Malone returned to competition at the 2021 NCAA Championships, where he helped Stanford defend their team title. He defended his all-around and horizontal bar titles and won silver on rings. At the 2021 U.S. National Championships, he won his first senior all-around title, defeating six-time national champion Sam Mikulak. As a result, he qualified to compete at the upcoming Olympic Trials. Malone clinched his spot on the Olympic team by finishing first in the all-around at the Olympic Trials. Malone was joined by Yul Moldauer, Sam Mikulak, and Shane Wiskus to form the United States men's Olympic gymnastics team.

==== 2020 Summer Olympic Games ====
During qualification at the Olympic Games, Malone qualified for the all-around final in 11th place and additionally qualified for the horizontal bar final in fourth. During the team final, Malone helped the United States place fifth. During the all-around final, Malone finished tenth; however he successfully competed his new skill on the parallel bars, a shoot up to handstand and fall back to support with ¾ turn mount, which now bears his name in the code of points.

In October, Malone competed at the 2021 World Championships where he only competed on the horizontal bar. He qualified for the event final in fourth place. During the event final he scored 14.966 and finished third behind Hu Xuwei and Daiki Hashimoto.

=== 2022 ===
In February, Malone competed at the Cottbus World Cup where he advanced to the pommel horse, rings, parallel bars, and horizontal bar event finals. On the first day of event finals, Malone won bronze on pommel horse behind Filip Ude and Illia Kovtun and placed sixth on rings. On the second day, he won bronze on parallel bars behind Kovtun and Mitchell Morgans and won gold on the horizontal bar. Malone next competed at the DTB Pokal Team Challenge in Stuttgart alongside Vitaliy Guimaraes, Asher Hong, Yul Moldauer, and Khoi Young; they finished first as a team.

Malone was awarded the Nissen Emery Award, the highest honor in college men's gymnastics. At the NCAA Championships, Malone helped Stanford defend their national title. Additionally, he defended his horizontal bar title, co-won gold on the pommel horse, won bronze on floor exercise, and placed second in the all-around behind Paul Juda after a subpar routine on parallel bars.

In June, Malone was selected to represent the United States at the Pan American Championships alongside Riley Loos, Yul Moldauer, Colt Walker, and Shane Wiskus. On the first day of competition, Malone competed on pommel horse, rings, parallel bars, and horizontal bar to help qualify the United States in first place to the team final. Individually, he won gold on the horizontal bar and recorded the third-highest parallel bars score, but did not medal due to two-per-country limitations and teammates Moldauer and Walker scoring higher. During the team final, Malone competed on pommel horse, rings, vault, and horizontal bar to help the U.S. win gold ahead of the reigning team champion Brazil.

In late July, Malone competed at the U.S. Classic where he won the all-around title with a score of 88.558 (86.000 without bonus). Additionally, he posted the top horizontal bar score, second-highest rings score, and third-highest pommel horse and parallel bars score. In August, Malone competed at the U.S. National Championships where he won his second consecutive national all-around title. As a result, he and second-place finisher Donnell Whittenburg were selected to represent the United States at the World Championships. Additionally, Malone placed first on floor exercise and horizontal bar, second on pommel horse, seventh on rings, eighth on vault, and fifth on parallel bars.

In September, Malone competed at the Paris World Challenge Cup. He qualified for the rings, parallel bars, and horizontal bar event finals. Although he withdrew from the rings final, he won gold on the horizontal bar and silver on parallel bars behind Caio Souza.

At the 2022 World Championships, Malone qualified for the all-around and horizontal bar finals. During the team final, he contributed scores on all apparatuses towards the U.S.'s fifth-place finish. During the all-around final, Malone finished in fourth place, three-tenths of a point behind third-place finisher Wataru Tanigawa. During the horizontal bar final, Malone beat Daiki Hashimoto by 0.1 point, and became the second American to win a world gold on the apparatus after Kurt Thomas did so in 1979.

=== 2023 ===
Malone was selected to represent the United States at the DTB Pokal Team Challenge in March 2023 alongside Yul Moldauer, Asher Hong, Fred Richard, and Shane Wiskus. Together, they placed first as a team and individually, Malone qualified for the horizontal bar final. During event finals, Malone injured his knee while dismounting from the horizontal bar, which required surgery at a local hospital to get an external fixator installed. Upon returning to Stanford Malone then underwent a second surgery to repair a tibial plateau fracture, a meniscus tear, and cartilage damage. An MRI later revealed that Malone also had a partially torn posterior cruciate ligament and a fully torn lateral collateral ligament. Malone would have to undergo a third surgery to repair the LCL. As a result, Malone would miss both the 2023 U.S. National Championships and the 2023 World Championships.

=== 2024 ===
Malone returned to competition at the 2024 Winter Cup but only competed on pommel horse, rings, and parallel bars. He made his all-around return at the 2024 National Championships where he won his third all-around national title.

In June, Malone competed at the U.S. Olympic Trials, where he placed second all-around (170.30), sixth on floor (28.10), fifth on pommel horse (27.40), fourth on rings (28.55), fifth on parallel bars (29.50), and fourth on horizontal bar (27.450). On June 29, he was named to the U.S. Olympic Team to compete at the 2024 Olympic Games alongside Fred Richard, Asher Hong, Paul Juda, and Stephen Nedoroscik.

At the 2024 Paris Olympics, Malone was part of the team that earned a bronze medal in the team final. This was the first medal in the event since 2008, marking the end of a 16-year drought. In the fall Malone participated in the Gold Over America Tour.

=== 2025 ===
Malone returned to competition in August at the National Championships. On the first day of competition, Malone fell off the horizontal bar twice but competed cleanly on pommel horse, rings, and parallel bars. On the second day, Malone rallied on the horizontal bar, successfully performing one of the most difficult routines in the world. At the conclusion of the competition, he placed first on parallel bars, second on rings, and third on pommel horse. Afterwards, he was selected to compete at the 2025 World Championships alongside Brandon Dang, Asher Hong, Patrick Hoopes, Kameron Nelson, and Donnell Whittenburg.

At the World Championships, Malone qualified for the horizontal bar final in sixth place after he was not credited for his "Winkler" skill due to an insufficient layout position. During the event final he was credited for the skill and earned a total score of 14.933, winning the gold medal ahead of Daiki Hashimoto and Joe Fraser. In winning his second World title, Malone became the third American male gymnast to achieve this feat after Kurt Thomas, who won three World titles between 1978–1979, and Paul Hamm, who won two World titles at the 2003 World Championships.

== Personal life ==
Malone identifies as a Christian. On December 31, 2023, he announced his engagement to his high school sweetheart, Serena Ortiz. They married on May 31, 2025, in Malone's hometown of Rockmart, Georgia.

== Eponymous skills ==
Malone has one named element on the parallel bars.

Gymnastics elements named after Brody Malone
Apparatus	Name	Description	Difficulty (Note: Valid for the 2025–2028 Code of Points)	Added to Code of Points
Parallel bars	Malone	"Shoot up to handstand and fall back to support with ¼ turn."	E, 0.5	Performed at the 2020 Olympic Games – Men's All-Around

== Competitive history ==
Competitive history of Brody Malone at the junior level
Year	Event	Team	AA	FX	PH	SR	VT	PB	HB
2015	J.O. National Championships (L9 JE14)		7	14	13	23	18	7	6
2016	J.O. National Championships (L10 JE15)		2nd place, silver medalist(s)	12	5	3rd place, bronze medalist(s)	2nd place, silver medalist(s)	2nd place, silver medalist(s)	5
2016	U.S. National Championships (15–16)		15	22	24	12	7	20	3rd place, bronze medalist(s)
2017	J.O. National Championships (JE17)		2nd place, silver medalist(s)						
2017	U.S. National Championships (17–18)		1st place, gold medalist(s)	1st place, gold medalist(s)	1st place, gold medalist(s)	2nd place, silver medalist(s)	4	1st place, gold medalist(s)	1st place, gold medalist(s)
2017	Junior Japan International		4				6	4	2nd place, silver medalist(s)
2018	RD761 International Junior Team Cup	3rd place, bronze medalist(s)	6			3rd place, bronze medalist(s)	5	6	2nd place, silver medalist(s)

Competitive history of Brody Malone at the senior level
Year	Event	Team	AA	FX	PH	SR	VT	PB	HB
2019	NCAA Championships	1st place, gold medalist(s)	1st place, gold medalist(s)	1st place, gold medalist(s)	9	8		4	1st place, gold medalist(s)
2019	Pan American Games	2nd place, silver medalist(s)	5		4			5	
2020	Winter Cup		3rd place, bronze medalist(s)		12				
2021	NCAA Championships	1st place, gold medalist(s)	1st place, gold medalist(s)			2nd place, silver medalist(s)			1st place, gold medalist(s)
2021	U.S. National Championships		1st place, gold medalist(s)	9	4	2nd place, silver medalist(s)	1st place, gold medalist(s)	13	2nd place, silver medalist(s)
2021	Olympic Trials		1st place, gold medalist(s)	2nd place, silver medalist(s)	6	2nd place, silver medalist(s)	6	3rd place, bronze medalist(s)	1st place, gold medalist(s)
2021	Olympic Games	5	10						4
2021	World Team Trials								1st place, gold medalist(s)
2021	World Championships								3rd place, bronze medalist(s)
2022	Cottbus World Cup				3rd place, bronze medalist(s)	6		3rd place, bronze medalist(s)	1st place, gold medalist(s)
2022	DTB Pokal Team Challenge	1st place, gold medalist(s)							5
2022	MPSF Championships	1st place, gold medalist(s)	1st place, gold medalist(s)	3rd place, bronze medalist(s)	5	2nd place, silver medalist(s)	6	11	1st place, gold medalist(s)
2022	NCAA Championships	1st place, gold medalist(s)	2nd place, silver medalist(s)	3rd place, bronze medalist(s)	1st place, gold medalist(s)	7	9	34	1st place, gold medalist(s)
2022	Pan American Championships	1st place, gold medalist(s)							1st place, gold medalist(s)
2022	U.S. Classic		1st place, gold medalist(s)	4	3rd place, bronze medalist(s)	2nd place, silver medalist(s)	9	3rd place, bronze medalist(s)	1st place, gold medalist(s)
2022	U.S. National Championships		1st place, gold medalist(s)	1st place, gold medalist(s)	2nd place, silver medalist(s)	7	8	5	1st place, gold medalist(s)
2022	Paris Challenge Cup					WD		2nd place, silver medalist(s)	1st place, gold medalist(s)
2022	World Championships	5	4						1st place, gold medalist(s)
2023	DTB Pokal Team Challenge	1st place, gold medalist(s)							6
2024	Winter Cup				4	13		3rd place, bronze medalist(s)	
2024	U.S. National Championships		1st place, gold medalist(s)	12	4	2nd place, silver medalist(s)		5	1st place, gold medalist(s)
2024	Olympic Trials		2nd place, silver medalist(s)	6	5	4		5	4
2024	Olympic Games	3rd place, bronze medalist(s)							
2025	U.S. National Championships				3rd place, bronze medalist(s)	2nd place, silver medalist(s)		1st place, gold medalist(s)	5
2025	World Championships								1st place, gold medalist(s)
