= Donothan Bailey =

American gymnast

- Full name: Donothan Anthony Bailey
- Born: December 29, 1990 (age 35) Orange County, California, U.S.
- Height: 5 ft 7 in (170 cm)

Gymnastics career
- Discipline: Men's artistic gymnastics
- Country represented: United States (2011–2012, 2015–2019)
- College team: California Golden Bears (2010–2014)
- Gym: USOTC; Team Hilton; Azarian U.S. Gymnastics Training Center
- Head coach: Andriy Stepanchenko
- Former coaches: JT Okada; Aaron Floyd; Eduard Azaryan
- Retired: c. 2021
Medal record
Men's artistic gymnastics
Representing United States
Event	1st	2nd	3rd
Pan American Games	0	0	1
Universiade	1	0	0
Total	1	0	1
Pan American Games
Bronze medal – third place	2011 Guadalajara	Team
Universiade
Gold medal – first place	2015 Gwangju	Pommel horse

Donothan Anthony Bailey (born December 29, 1990) is a retired American artistic gymnast. He was a member of the United States men's national artistic gymnastics team.

== Early life and education ==
Bailey was born on December 29, 1990, in Orange County, California. His hometown is Lake Forest, California, and he attended Mission Viejo High School. He trained at Azarian U.S. Gymnastics Training Center under coach Eduard Azarian. He later enrolled at the University of California, Berkeley to pursue gymnastics.

== Gymnastics career ==
In college, Bailey competed for the California Golden Bears men's gymnastics team from 2010 through 2014.

Nationally, he won a silver medal on the pommel horse at the 2016 Winter Cup and a bronze at the 2015 Winter Cup. He added a horizontal bar bronze medal at the 2017 Winter Cup. He was the United States champion on the pommel horse at the 2016 U.S. National Gymnastics Championships and won two silver medals at the 2018 U.S. National Gymnastics Championships.

Internationally, Bailey represented the United States at the 2011 Pan American Games and won a bronze medal in the team all-around.

Bailey's last major competition was the 2021 U.S. National Gymnastics Championships.
