= 2016 Winter Cup =

Artistic gymnastics competition in the USA

- Venue: Cashman Center
- Location: Las Vegas, Nevada, U.S.
- Dates: February 18—February 20, 2016

The 2016 Winter Cup was an artistic gymnastics competition held at the Cashman Center in Las Vegas from February 18 to February 20, 2016.

== Competition ==
The finals session featured the top 42 gymnasts according to their all-around ranking and the top three gymnasts on each apparatus. The all-around and individual event champions were determined via a combined two-day score. Performances at the Winter Cup helped determine eight men who comprised the United States men's national gymnastics team at the 2016 U.S. National Gymnastics Championships.

== Medalists ==
Event	Gold	Silver	Bronze
Senior Men'
Individual all-around	Sam Mikulak	Akash Modi	Sean Melton
Floor	Eddie Penev	Steven Legendre	Joshua Dixon
Pommel horse	Sam Mikulak	Donothan Bailey	Allan Bower; Ellis Mannon
Rings	Donnell Whittenburg	Sean Melton	CJ Maestas
Vault	Eddie Penev	Steven Legendre	Donnell Whittenburg
Parallel bars	Sean Melton	Yul Moldauer	CJ Maestas
Horizontal bar	Sam Mikulak	Akash Modi	Marvin Kimble
