= Akash Modi =

American artistic gymnast

- Full name: Akash Modi
- Born: May 9, 1995 (age 31) Edison, New Jersey, U.S.
- Height: 5 ft 1 in (155 cm)

Gymnastics career
- Discipline: Men's artistic gymnastics
- Country represented: United States; (2013–2022)
- College team: Stanford Cardinal
- Gym: Cypress Academy; Monmouth Gymnastics
- Head coach: Thom Gleilmi
- Awards: Nissen-Emery Award (2017)
Medal record
Men's artistic gymnastics
Representing United States
Event	1st	2nd	3rd
Pacific Rim Championships	2	2	0
Total	2	2	0
Pacific Rim Championships
Gold medal – first place	2018 Medellín	Team
Gold medal – first place	2018 Medellín	Parallel bars
Silver medal – second place	2018 Medellín	All-around
Silver medal – second place	2018 Medellín	Rings

Akash Modi (born May 9, 1995) is an American artistic gymnast. He has been a member of the United States men's national artistic gymnastics team and represented the United States at the 2018 and the 2019 World Artistic Gymnastics Championships. He was an alternate for the 2016 and 2020 Olympic teams.

== Early life and education ==
Born in Edison, New Jersey, Modi grew up in the Morganville section of Marlboro Township, New Jersey, and attended High Technology High School, from which he graduated in 2013.

== Gymnastics career ==
Modi competed at the 2013 Winter Cup where he won silver on parallel bars. He competed at the 2014 Winter Cup where he won gold on parallel bars. He competed at the 2016 Winter Cup where he won silver on horizontal bar and all-around. He competed at the 2017 Winter Cup where he won silver on parallel bars, horizontal bar, and all-around and bronze on floor. He competed at the 2018 Winter Cup where he won silver on floor and parallel bars and bronze in the all-around.

=== 2020–21 ===
In early 2020, Modi competed at the Winter Cup and finished 15th in the all-around. The remainder of competitions for the year were canceled or postponed due to the COVID-19 pandemic.

Modi returned to competition at the 2021 U.S. National Championships where he finished sixth in the all-around. As a result, he qualified to compete at the Olympic Trials. At the Olympic Trials Modi finished sixth in the all-around. He was named as an alternate for the Olympic team.

== Personal life ==
Modi's cousin, Raj Bhavsar, was also a member of the United States men's national artistic gymnastics team and won an Olympic Bronze medal at the 2008 Summer Olympics.

== Competitive history ==
Competitive history of Akash Modi
Year	Event	Team	AA	FX	PH	SR	VT	PB	HB
2013	Winter Cup		6	5	13	14	23	2nd place, silver medalist(s)	17
2013	Kyle Shewfelt Festival		1st place, gold medalist(s)				4	1st place, gold medalist(s)	3rd place, bronze medalist(s)
2013	U.S. National Championships		8	18	5	16	13	3rd place, bronze medalist(s)	15
2013	DTB Team Challenge	5							
2014	Winter Cup		4	12	8	14	22	1st place, gold medalist(s)	15
2014	NCAA Championships	3rd place, bronze medalist(s)	2nd place, silver medalist(s)		3rd place, bronze medalist(s)			2nd place, silver medalist(s)	
2014	U.S. National Championships		12	11	15	14	22	4	31
2014	DTB Team Challenge	2nd place, silver medalist(s)							
2015	Winter Cup		9	5	27	19	10	4	6
2015	NCAA Championships	2nd place, silver medalist(s)	1st place, gold medalist(s)	8	3rd place, bronze medalist(s)			2nd place, silver medalist(s)	2nd place, silver medalist(s)
2015	São Paulo World Cup			5	8				
2015	Summer Universiade		3rd place, bronze medalist(s)	7	3rd place, bronze medalist(s)			5	6
2015	U.S. National Championships		17	11	25	28	31	5	13
2016	Winter Cup		2nd place, silver medalist(s)	18	10	10	18	7	2nd place, silver medalist(s)
2016	Glasgow World Cup		4						
2016	NCAA Championships	2nd place, silver medalist(s)	2nd place, silver medalist(s)	8			10	1st place, gold medalist(s)	1st place, gold medalist(s)
2016	U.S. National Championships		4	6	4	15	15	3rd place, bronze medalist(s)	10
2016	Olympic Trials		6	9	5	14	13	5	9
2017	Winter Cup		2nd place, silver medalist(s)	3rd place, bronze medalist(s)	8	8	5	2nd place, silver medalist(s)	2nd place, silver medalist(s)
2017	American Cup		3rd place, bronze medalist(s)						
2017	NCAA Championships	4	1st place, gold medalist(s)		2nd place, silver medalist(s)		4	1st place, gold medalist(s)	3rd place, bronze medalist(s)
2017	U.S. National Championships		4	8	13	7	11	1st place, gold medalist(s)	5
'2018	Winter Cup		3rd place, bronze medalist(s)	2nd place, silver medalist(s)			7	2nd place, silver medalist(s)	7
'2018	Stuttgart World Cup		2nd place, silver medalist(s)						
'2018	Pacific Rim Championships	1st place, gold medalist(s)	2nd place, silver medalist(s)	1st place, gold medalist(s)		2nd place, silver medalist(s)		1st place, gold medalist(s)	4
'2018	U.S. National Championships		6	5	6	9	7	15	5
'2018	World Team Trials		4						
'2018	World Championships	4							
2019	Winter Cup		7		8			7	10
2019	Stuttgart World Cup		5						
2019	U.S. National Championships		3rd place, bronze medalist(s)	8	7	5	13	5	2nd place, silver medalist(s)
2019	World Team Trials		2nd place, silver medalist(s)						
2019	World Championships	4							
2020	Winter Cup		15	10	8	9	8	4	14
2021	U.S. National Championships		6	14	8	7	8	10	5
2021	Olympic Trials		6	9	9	10	12	5	5
