= Robert Neff =

American artistic gymnast

- Full name: Robert Hayden Neff
- Born: October 9, 1995 (age 30) Brookfield, Wisconsin, U.S.
- Height: 5 ft 7 in (170 cm)

Gymnastics career
- Discipline: Men's artistic gymnastics
- Country represented: United States; (2017, 2019–2022)
- College team: Stanford Cardinal
- Gym: USOTC
- Head coach: Syque Caesar
- Former coach: Thom Glielmi
- Retired: August 10, 2022
Medal record
Men's artistic gymnastics
Representing United States
Event	1st	2nd	3rd
Pan American Games	0	3	0
Total	0	3	0
Pan American Games
Silver medal – second place	2019 Lima	Team
Silver medal – second place	2019 Lima	Floor
Silver medal – second place	2019 Lima	Pommel horse

Robert Hayden Neff (born October 9, 1995) is a retired American artistic gymnast. He is a former member of the United States men's national artistic gymnastics team.

== Early life and education ==
Neff was born October 9, 1995, in Brookfield, Wisconsin, to Richard and Jo-Ann Neff. He lived outside of the United States for nine years, spending time in Australia, Switzerland, and England. He trained with Swiss Turners Gymnastics Academy. He attended Brookfield Academy and later enrolled at Stanford University to pursue gymnastics.

== Gymnastics career ==
In 2019, he represented the United States at the Pan American Games held in Lima, Peru and he won the silver medal in the men's pommel horse event. He also won the silver medal both in the floor exercise and in the men's artistic team all-around event.

Neff announced he had retired from gymnastics via Instagram in August 2022.
