= Sean Melton =

American artistic gymnast

- Born: October 29, 1994 (age 31) Orlando, Florida, U.S.
- Height: 1.7 m (5 ft 7 in)

Gymnastics career
- Discipline: Men's artistic gymnastics
- Country represented: United States
- College team: Ohio State Buckeyes (2013–present)
- Club: USOTC
- Head coach: Rustam Sharipov
- Assistant coach: Casimiro Suárez
- Awards: Nissen-Emery Award (2018)

Sean Melton (born October 29, 1994) is an American artistic gymnast. A prodigious junior, he currently represents the Ohio State Buckeyes in the NCAA, and is a member of the United States men's national gymnastics team.

== Personal life ==
Melton was born in Orlando, Florida to parents Sidney and Debbie Melton. He has two siblings; Jordan and Raelyn Melton. He attended Freedom High School and The First Academy, both in Orlando; he graduated high school in 2013.
