= Jeremy Bischoff =

American artistic gymnast

- Full name: Jeremy Reece Bischoff
- Born: January 16, 2002 (age 24) Panorama City, California, U.S.
- Height: 5 ft 8 in (173 cm)

Gymnastics career
- Discipline: Men's artistic gymnastics
- Country represented: United States (2023–2025)
- College team: Stanford Cardinal (2021–2025)
- Gym: Waller's Gymjam Academy
- Head coach: Thom Glielmi
- Assistant coaches: Rubén López; Grant Breckenridge
- Former coach: Raj Bhavsar
- Retired: May 7, 2025
Medal record
Men's artistic gymnastics
Representing Stanford Cardinal
NCAA Championships
Gold medal – first place	2021 Minneapolis	Team
Gold medal – first place	2022 Norman	Team
Gold medal – first place	2023 State College	Team
Gold medal – first place	2024 Columbus	Team
Silver medal – second place	2025 Ann Arbor	Team

Jeremy Reece Bischoff (born January 16, 2002) is an American former artistic gymnast. He was a member of the United States national gymnastics team and competed in collegiate gymnastics for the Stanford Cardinal and helped the Cardinal win four NCAA National Championships.

== Early life and education ==
Jeremy Bischoff was born and raised in Santa Clarita, California, to Mia and David Bischoff. He has one sibling, Kiona. He attended Learning Post Academy and graduated in 2020. As a student-athlete at Stanford University, Bischoff majored in computer science. He started gymnastics at four years old and trained under Raj Bhavsar at Waller's Gymjam Academy.

== Gymnastics career ==
=== 2018 ===
Individually, Bischoff placed first for the parallel bars title and placed second all-around at the 2018 Men's Junior Olympic National Championships in Oklahoma City, OK. He then helped his team earn bronze at the 2018 J.O. Nationals.

=== 2019 ===
Bischoff placed as regional and state all-around champion, and placed in the top ten in five out of the six apparatuses at the 2019 U.S. Gymnastics Championships in Kansas City, Missouri, leading to a fourth-place finish in the all-around. He placed third on floor exercise, fifth on horizontal bar, seventh on pommel horse, and eighth on still rings and parallel bars. His success at the U.S. Championships led to his selection for the Junior National Team (2019–20).

=== 2020-2021 ===
Bischoff competed in the junior division at 2020 Winter Cup and led his team to a third-place finish at the 2020 Elite Team Cup. He then committed to and began competing for the Stanford University's men's gymnastics team, where he competed in three meets for the 2020–2021 season and helped defend Stanford's team title as 2021 NCAA Championships.

=== 2022 ===
Bischoff managed a 13.850 on floor exercise and 13.250 on pommel horse at the Pac-12 Invite, and scored a 14.450 on parallel bars at California as his career best. For his senior international debut, he alongside teammate Taylor Burkhart, competed at the Varna World Challenge Cup.

=== 2023 ===
Bischoff won his lone event title on the horizontal bar at the Cal Benefit Cup with a 14.000 and performed a season-best 14.400 on parallel bars at the Rocky Mountain Open. He then finished the season ranked seventh in the nation on parallel bars (14.100) and twenty-fifth on floor exercise (13.638), again helping Stanford to defend their national title at the 2023 NCAA Championships.

In March, Bischoff represented the United States at the DTB Pokal Mixed Cup in Stuttgart, Germany, alongside Senior Men Landon Blixt and Isaiah Drake, leading his team to a fourth-place finish.

In August, Bischoff competed at the 2023 Core Hydration Classic where he placed sixth overall. A few weeks later, Bischoff competed at the 2023 Xfinity National Championships, where he secured his spot on the senior national team.

=== 2024–2025 ===
Bischoff started the year strong at the 2024 Winter Cup, and re-secured his spot on the senior national team. He placed seventh in the all-around. and was crowned horizontal bar Silver Medalist, right behind Curran Phillips.

Bischoff competed at the 2024 MPSF Championships, where he helped Stanford place first as a team, competing on floor exercise and horizontal bar and placing second with a 14.35 and third with a 13.75, respectively. At the 2024 NCAA Championships, Bischoff competed on floor exercise and horizontal bar, placing eighth on the former and being named a 2024 NCAA All-American, helping secure Stanford's historic 5-peat NCAA championship title.

At the 2024 U.S. Xfinity Championships With a fifth-place finish on horizontal bar and twelfth place in the all-around, Bischoff retained his spot on the senior national team and qualified to compete at the 2024 U.S. Olympic Trials.

Bischoff announced his retirement from gymnastics on Instagram on May 7, 2025.

== Personal life ==
Recently, Bischoff dabbled in some dancing, as shown in his feature as one of Stephen Nedoroscik's teammates in the finale of Dancing with the Stars with pro dancer Rylee Arnold. Their freestyle performance to Viva la Vida by Coldplay instantly became a fan-favorite among viewers, and earned Nedoroscik and Arnold their first perfect score of the season.
