= Ian Gunther =

American artistic gymnast

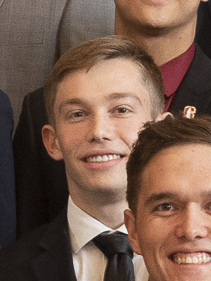
- Gunther in 2019

Personal information
- Full name: Ian David Gunther
- Born: September 10, 1999 (age 26) Houston, Texas, U.S.
- Height: 5 ft 7 in (170 cm)

Gymnastics career
- Discipline: Men's artistic gymnastics
- Country represented: United States (2021–2022)
- College team: Stanford Cardinal (2019–2023)
- Gym: Cypress Academy
- Head coach: Thom Glielmi
- Former coach: Syque Caesar
- Retired: December 8, 2024
Medal record
Representing the Stanford Cardinal
NCAA Championships
Gold medal – first place	2019 Champaign	Team
Gold medal – first place	2021 Minneapolis	Team
Gold medal – first place	2022 Norman	Team
Gold medal – first place	2023 State College	Team

TikTok information
- Page: Ian Gunther│Gymnastics Daily
- Followers: 1.4 million

YouTube information
- Channel: Ian Gunther
- Genre: Sport
- Subscribers: 2.17 million
- Views: 5,072,587,338
- Last updated: May 5, 2026

Ian David Gunther (born September 10, 1999) is an American social media content creator and former artistic gymnast. He is a 4-time NCAA team champion, and an MPSF team champion with Stanford. Individually, he was a horizontal bar bronze medalist at the 2023 Winter Cup, and placed 8th all-around. He is a former member of the United States men's national artistic gymnastics team.

== Early life and education ==
Gunther was born in Houston, Texas, on September 10, 1999. He attended Westside High School in Houston, class of 2018. At Stanford, he majored in product design, graduating in 2022, and completed an M.S. in sustainability science & practice.

Gunther has suffered from osteochondritis dissecans of the knee from his intense gymnastics training. He had surgery to correct it in 2015.

== Gymnastics career ==
Gunther began gymnastics at the age of 4 and a half. During his career, he has been an NCAA All-American 10 times. In 2017, he won gold on rings and parallel bars at the Junior Olympic national meet.

Gunther began competing for the Stanford Cardinal in the 2018–2019 season. During the 2019 NCAA National Championships, Gunther helped Stanford win as a team; individually, he placed fourth on rings. Gunther would go on and help Stanford win the team title again in 2021, 2022, and 2023.

In 2021 Gunther qualified to compete at the 2020 Olympic Trials. He finished twelfth overall. In 2022, he received media attention for breaking a horizontal bar in half.

In the fall of 2024, Gunther participated in the Gold Over America Tour. He later competed at the 2024 Sokol Grand Prix and placed second with teammate Vanesa Masova. In a YouTube short, Gunther announced it was his last competitive routine. He followed that with an Instagram post on December 8, 2024, confirming his retirement from competitive gymnastics.

== Social media ==
Gunther received media recognition for his work on Collyge, an app rivaling TikTok in the short-form video market. The app launched in March 2023.

Gunther has gained attention from the national media for his efforts to promote gymnastics via social media. He started creating content during the COVID-19 pandemic in the United States when the NCAA gymnastics season was shut down. His activity on social media allowed Gunther to pay for his Stanford student tuition.

== Competitive history ==
Competitive history of Ian Gunther
Year	Event	Team	AA	FX	PH	SR	VT	PB	HB
2016	U.S. National Championships (15-16)		19	25	6	6	28	11	16
2017	RD761 International					2nd place, silver medalist(s)		5	
2017	Winter Cup (junior)		27	33	30	23	33	35	27
2017	U.S. National Championships (17-18)		10	14	10	4	15	3rd place, bronze medalist(s)	5
2018	Winter Cup (junior)		14	14	4	9	13	13	2nd place, silver medalist(s)
2018	Elite Team Cup	1st place, gold medalist(s)							
2019	Winter Cup		36						
2019	NCAA Championships	1st place, gold medalist(s)			28	4			
2020	Winter Cup		10	17	5	7	20	9	6
2021	NCAA Championships	1st place, gold medalist(s)			5	4		7	
2021	U.S. National Championships		8	22	11	14	20	4	6
2021	Olympic Trials		12	13	12	11	16	11	8
2022	Winter Cup		13	31	10	14	34	20	4
2022	NCAA Championships	1st place, gold medalist(s)				6		5	
2023	Winter Cup		8	20	9		5	13	3rd place, bronze medalist(s)
2023	NCAA Championships	1st place, gold medalist(s)				14		10	17
2023	U.S. Classic		12	47	39	50	40	11	17
2023	U.S. National Championships		16	18	18		13	28	19
2024	Winter Cup			11		9			6
2024	U.S. National Championships			21		13		27	8
