= 2022 Winter Cup =

Artistic gymnastics competition in the USA

- Venue: Ford Center at The Star
- Location: Frisco, Texas, U.S.
- Dates: February 25–27, 2022

The 2022 Winter Cup was an artistic gymnastics competition held at the Ford Center at The Star in Frisco. Like the previous year it included both men's and women's artistic gymnastics.

== Competition schedule ==
The competition featured senior and junior competitions for both women's and men's disciplines. The competition schedule was as follows (all times in central):

Friday, February 25:

- Nastia Liukin Cup, 1:30 p.m.
- Winter Cup Men's Day 1, 6:30 p.m.

Saturday, February 26:

- Winter Cup Senior Women, noon
- Elite Team Cup, 5:30 p.m.

Sunday, February 27:

- Winter Cup Junior Women, noon
- Winter Cup Men's Day 2, 5:30 p.m.

== Sponsorship ==
The 2022 Winter Cup was sponsored by apparel manufacturers Ozone and Turn.

== Medalists ==
Event	Gold	Silver	Bronze
Senior Women
Individual all-around	Konnor McClain	Skye Blakely	eMjae Frazier
Vault	Joscelyn Roberson	Paityn Walker	—N/a
Uneven bars	Nola Matthews	Paityn Walker	Elle Mueller Lauren Little
Balance beam	Konnor McClain	eMjae Frazier	Ashlee Sullivan Skye Blakely
Floor	eMjae Frazier	Skye Blakely	Konnor McClain Karis German
Junior Women
Individual all-around	Ella Kate Parker	Ella Murphy	Hezly Rivera
Vault	Tiana Sumanasekera	Ella Kate Parker Zoey Molomo	—N/a
Uneven bars	Gabriella Van Frayen	Alicia Zhou	Jayla Hang Myli Lew
Balance beam	Ella Kate Parker	Tiana Sumanasekera	Ella Murphy
Floor	Ella Kate Parker Tiana Sumanasekera	—N/a	Azaraya Ra-Akbar
Senior Men
Individual all-around	Vitaliy Guimaraes	Khoi Young	Asher Hong
Floor	Ian Lasic-Ellis	Asher Hong	Raydel Gamboa
Pommel horse	Khoi Young	Yul Moldauer	Zachary Nunez
Rings	Alex Diab	Asher Hong	Yul Moldauer
Vault	Asher Hong	Khoi Young	Colt Walker
Parallel bars	Curran Phillips	Yul Moldauer	Asher Hong
Horizontal bar	Jack Freeman	Curran Phillips	Michael Jaroh

== National team ==
Male gymnasts were contending for spots on the men's national team. After the conclusion of the competition the following members were named:

- 2021 World medalists:
  - Brody Malone
  - Stephen Nedoroscik
- Top 5 all-around after the first day of competition:
  - Vitaliy Guimaraes
  - Khoi Young
  - Asher Hong
  - Yul Moldauer
  - Colt Walker
- Individual event winners
  - Alex Diab (rings)
  - Curran Phillips (parallel bars)
- Discretionary (Note: Due to bad weather in Texas, gymnasts from Michigan were unable to arrive in time to compete on the first day of competition)
  - Paul Juda
- 10-points program
  - Ian Lasic-Ellis
  - Riley Loos
- Petition
  - Cameron Bock
  - Shane Wiskus
  - Alec Yoder

== Participants ==
=== Men ===
- Michael Artlip (Penn State University)
- Fuzzy Benas (University of Oklahoma)
- Jeremy Bischoff (Stanford University)
- Landen Blixt (Infinity Gymnastics Academy)
- Crew Bold (University of Michigan)
- Garrett Braunton (United States Air Force Academy)
- Taylor Burkhart (Stanford Boys Gymnastics)
- Matt Cormier (Penn State University)
- Mathew Davis (Army West Point)
- Evan Davis (Iowa GymACT)
- Alex Diab (USOPTC)
- Isaiah Drake (United States Naval Academy)
- Mike Fletcher (University of Illinois)
- Jack Freeman (University of Oklahoma)
- James Friedman (Iowa GymACT)
- Raydel Gamboa (University of Oklahoma)
- Vitaliy Guimaraes (University of Oklahoma)
- Ian Gunther (Stanford University)
- Dallas Hale (Cypress Academy of Gymnastics)
- Kazuki Hayashi (Ohio State University)
- Asher Hong (Cypress Academy of Gymnastics)
- Evan Hymanson (Stanford Boys Gymnastics)
- Michael Jaroh (Penn State University)
- Paul Juda (University of Michigan)
- Nicolas Kuebler (Stanford University)
- Ian Lasic-Ellis (Stanford University)
- Toby Liang (Roswell Gymnastics)
- Riley Loos (Stanford University)
- Caleb Melton (Apollo Gymnastics)
- Yul Moldauer (5280 Gymnastics)
- Robert Neff (USPOTC)
- Noah Newfeld (University of California - Berkeley)
- Zachary Nuñez (University of Oklahoma)
- Cole Partridge (USA Gymnastics World)
- ~~Joey Pepe (University of Nebraska)~~
- Curran Phillips (Stanford University)
- Fred Richard (Massachusetts Elite Gymnastics Academy)
- Blake Sun (Stanford University)
- Colin Van Wicklen (University of Oklahoma)
- Colt Walker (University of Stanford)
- David Willett (University of Michigan)
- Ignacio Yockers (Pride Gymnastics Academy)
- Khoi Young (Stanford University)

=== Women ===
==== Senior ====
- Ciena Alipio (Midwest Gymnastics Center)
- Sydney Barros (World Champions Centre)
- Skye Blakely (WOGA Gymnastics)
- Charlotte Booth (Brandy Johnson's Global Gymnastics)
- ~~Kailin Chio (Gymcats Gymnastics)~~
- Addison Fatta (Prestige Gymnastics)
- eMjae Frazier (Parkettes National Gymnastics Training Center)
- Karis German (World Champions Centre)
- Katelyn Jong (Metroplex Gymnastics)
- Kaliya Lincoln (WOGA Gymnastics)
- Lauren Little (Everest)
- Konnor McClain (WOGA Gymnastics)
- Zoe Miller (World Champions Centre)
- Kaylen Morgan (Everest Gymnastics)
- Marissa Neal (Great American Gymnastics Express)
- Brooke Pierson (WOGA Gymnastics)
- Joscelyn Roberson (North East Texas Elite Gymnastics)
- Katelyn Rosen (Twin City Twisters)
- Ashlee Sullivan (WOGA Gymnastics)
- Lexi Zeiss (Twin City Twisters)

==== Junior ====
- Adriana Consoli (Pearland Elite)
- Nicole Desmond (First State Gymnastics)
- Amelia Disidore (Great American Gymnastics Express)
- Kieryn Finnell (Rochester Gymnastics Academy)
- Jayla Hang (Ascend Gymnastics Center)
- Gabrielle Hardie (Twin City Twisters)
- Madray Johnson (WOGA Gymnastics)
- Avery King (WOGA Gymnastics)
- Myli Lew (San Mateo Gymnastics)
- Annalisa Milton (Great American Gymnastics Express)
- Zoey Molomo (Metroplex)
- Ella Murphy (WOGA Gymnastics)
- Ella Kate Parker (Cincinnati Gymnastics)
- Claire Pease (WOGA Gymnastics)
- Michelle Pineda (Metroplex Gymnastics)
- Azaraya Ra-Akbar (World Class Gymnastics)
- Hezly Rivera (WOGA Gymnastics)
- Simone Rose (Ascend Gymnastics Center)
- Audrey Snyder (First State Gymnastics)
- Tiana Sumanasekera (West Valley Gymnastics School)
- Gabby Van Frayen (Gym X-Treme)

== Nastia Liukin Cup ==
The Nastia Liukin Cup
- Venue: Ford Center at The Star
- Location: Frisco, Texas, U.S.
- Dates: February 25, 2022
- Competitors: 36

The 13th annual Nastia Liukin Cup was held in conjunction with the 2022 Winter Cup. For the first time it was held in Frisco, Texas, the hometown of Nastia Liukin.

=== Medal winners ===
Event	Gold	Silver	Bronze
Senior
All-around	Jamison Sears	Nikki Smith	Avery Neff
Junior
All-around	Kamila Pawlak	Presley Duke	Jasmine Cawley

=== Notable competitors ===
Senior competitor, Faith Torrez, would go on become the 2026 NCAA all-around champion. Junior competitor, Jayla Hang, would become the 2025 Pan American all-around champion.
