= Curran Phillips =

American gymnast (born 2000)

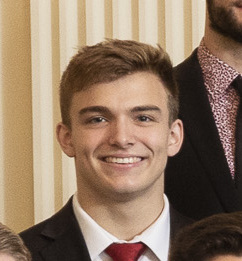
- Phillips in 2019

Personal information
- Full name: Curran Michael Phillips
- Born: July 8, 2000 (age 26) Naperville, Illinois, U.S.

Gymnastics career
- Discipline: Men's artistic gymnastics
- Country represented: United States; (2022–2024)
- College team: Stanford Cardinal
- Gym: EVO Gymnastics
- Head coach: Syque Caesar
- Assistant coaches: Kevin Mazeika, Sam Mikulak
- Former coach: Thom Glielmi
- Retired: July 2, 2024
Medal record
Men's artistic gymnastics
Representing United States
Event	1st	2nd	3rd
Pan American Games	2	0	0
Pan American Championships	2	0	0
Total	4	0	0
Pan American Games
Gold medal – first place	2023 Santiago	Team
Gold medal – first place	2023 Santiago	Parallel bars
Pan American Championships
Gold medal – first place	2023 Medellín	Team
Gold medal – first place	2023 Medellín	Horizontal bar

Curran Michael Phillips (born July 8, 2000) is an American former artistic gymnast. He was a member of the United States men's national artistic gymnastics team and was the 2023 Pan American champion on the horizontal bar and 2023 Pan American Games champion on parallel bars. He competed in collegiate gymnastics for Stanford.

== Early life and education ==
Phillips was born in Naperville, Illinois on July 8, 2000, to Debbie and Mike Phillips. He has one sister. In 2018, he graduated from Naperville North High School. He enrolled at Stanford University to pursue gymnastics.

== Gymnastics career ==
=== 2018–21 ===
In January 2018, Phillips competed at the Elite Team Cup where his team finished seventh. In August, he competed at the U.S. National Championships in the junior 17-18 division. He placed fifth in the all-around but co-won the title on parallel bars. He was named as an alternate for the Pan American Championships team.

Phillips began competing for the Stanford Cardinal gymnastics team in 2019. At the NCAA National Championships he helped Stanford win the team title.

The 2020 NCAA season was cut short due to the ongoing COVID-19 pandemic.

At the 2021 NCAA Championships, Phillips helped Stanford defend their team title. Individually, he won bronze on vault.

=== 2022 ===
At the 2022 Winter Cup, Phillips competed in three events. He finished first on parallel bars, second on horizontal bar behind Jack Freeman, and sixth on vault. He was named to the senior national team for the first time and was selected to compete at the DTB Pokal Mixed Cup in Stuttgart alongside Colt Walker, Riley Loos, Katelyn Jong, Karis German, and Levi Jung-Ruivivar. He competed on vault and horizontal bar, helping the USA qualify to the championship round. In the final round, he posted a 15.050 on the parallel bars to help the USA win. At the NCAA Championship Phillips helped Stanford defend their national title. Additionally, he placed first on parallel bars, winning his first individual national title. Phillips was named CGA Specialist of the Year.

In August, Phillips competed at the U.S. National Championships and won his first senior elite-level national title on the parallel bars.

=== 2023 ===
Phillips competed at the 2023 Winter Cup where he placed first on both parallel bars and horizontal bar. In March, he competed at the Baku World Cup, qualifying for both the parallel bars and horizontal bar finals in first and second, respectively. During event finals, he placed fifth in both.

Phillips was selected to represent the United States at the Pan American Championships alongside Yul Moldauer, Shane Wiskus, Khoi Young, and Taylor Christopulos. On the first day of competition, Phillips helped the USA qualify for the team final. Individually, he won gold on the horizontal bar, earning his first international title. On the final day of competition, Phillips helped the USA win their second consecutive team title.

In August, Phillips competed at the Core Hydration Classic where he placed first on parallel bars, fifth on vault, and nineteenth on horizontal bar. Phillips next competed at the Xfinity National Championships where he placed second on parallel bars behind Moldauer and seventh on horizontal bar. The following day he was named as an alternate for the team to compete at the Pan American Games taking place in late October. In early October Shane Wiskus withdrew from the Pan American Games team due to injury and Phillips was selected as his replacement.

At the Pan American Games, Phillips helped the United States win team gold. Individually, he qualified for the parallel bars final in first despite falling on the apparatus. During the event final, Phillips performed cleanly and scored 15.400, earning the gold medal.

=== 2024 ===
Phillips competed at the 2024 Winter Cup where he won apparatus titles on both parallel bars and horizontal bar. He competed at the DTB Pokal Team Challenge alongside Cameron Bock, Riley Loos, Yul Moldauer, and Shane Wiskus; they won gold as a team. Individually, Phillips won gold on parallel bars.

Phillips next competed at the 2024 U.S. National Championships, which was a qualifying event for the 2024 Olympic trials. On day one of the competition he suffered a thumb injury and withdrew from the competition but submitted a petition to compete at the Olympic trials; his petition was accepted. At the Olympic trials Phillips scored a 15.600 and 15.650 on the parallel bars to win the event title outright; despite this he was not named to the Olympic team.

Phillips announced his retirement from gymnastics competition in July 2024 via Instagram following the Olympic trials.

== Competitive history ==
Year	Event	Team	AA	FX	PH	SR	VT	PB	HB
2018	Elite Team Cup	7							
2018	National Qualifier		6						
2018	U.S. National Championships		5	9	13	8	5	1st place, gold medalist(s)	7
2019	NCAA Championships	1st place, gold medalist(s)					24	32	
2021	NCAA Championships	1st place, gold medalist(s)					3rd place, bronze medalist(s)		
2022	Winter Cup						6	1st place, gold medalist(s)	2nd place, silver medalist(s)
2022	DTB Pokal Mixed Cup	1st place, gold medalist(s)							
2022	MPSF Championships	1st place, gold medalist(s)					5	2nd place, silver medalist(s)	
2022	NCAA Championships	1st place, gold medalist(s)					6	1st place, gold medalist(s)	33
2022	Koper Challenge Cup							7	
2022	U.S. National Championships						11	1st place, gold medalist(s)	21
2023	Winter Cup							1st place, gold medalist(s)	1st place, gold medalist(s)
2023	Baku World Cup							5	5
2023	Pan American Championships	1st place, gold medalist(s)							1st place, gold medalist(s)
2023	U.S. Classic						5	1st place, gold medalist(s)	19
2023	U.S. National Championships							2nd place, silver medalist(s)	7
2023	Pan American Games	1st place, gold medalist(s)						1st place, gold medalist(s)	
2024	Winter Cup							1st place, gold medalist(s)	1st place, gold medalist(s)
2024	DTB Pokal Team Challenge	1st place, gold medalist(s)						1st place, gold medalist(s)	
2024	U.S. National Championships			WD			WD	WD	WD
2024	Olympic Trials			16				1st place, gold medalist(s)	9
