= 2022 U.S. National Gymnastics Championships =

- Venue: Amalie Arena
- Location: Tampa, Florida, U.S.
- Date: August 18, 2022–August 21, 2022

The 2022 U.S. National Gymnastics Championships, known as the 2022 OOFOS U.S. Gymnastics Championships, was the 58th edition of the U.S. National Gymnastics Championships. The competition was held at Amalie Arena in Tampa, Florida from August 18–21, 2022.

== Competition schedule and media ==
The competition featured Senior and Junior contests for both women's and men's disciplines. The competition schedule was as follows (in eastern time):

- Thursday, August 18: Men's gymnastics – juniors at 1:30 p.m. and seniors at 7 p.m.
- Friday, August 19: Women's gymnastics – juniors at 1:30 p.m. and seniors at 7 p.m.
- Saturday, August 20: Men's gymnastics – juniors at 1:30 p.m. and seniors at 7 p.m.
- Sunday, August 21: Women's gymnastics – juniors at 1:30 p.m. and seniors at 7 p.m.

The event was broadcast on NBC Sports.

== Sponsorship ==
In July it was announced that OOFOS, a global leader in recovery footwear, would be the title sponsor for the event.

== Medalists ==
Event	Gold	Silver	Bronze
Senior Women
Individual all-around	Konnor McClain	Shilese Jones	Jordan Chiles
Vault	Jade Carey	Joscelyn Roberson	—N/a
Uneven bars	Shilese Jones Leanne Wong	—N/a	Jordan Chiles
Balance beam	Konnor McClain	Ciena Alipio	Kayla DiCello
Floor	Shilese Jones	Jade Carey	Jordan Chiles
Junior Women
Individual all-around	Madray Johnson	Jayla Hang	Alicia Zhou
Vault	Jayla Hang	Tiana Sumanasekera	Christiane Popovitch
Uneven bars	Alicia Zhou	Madray Johnson	Jayla Hang
Balance beam	Jayla Hang Madray Johnson Myli Lew Audrey Snyder	—N/a	
Floor	Tiana Sumanasekera	Izzy Stassi	Dulcy Caylor Madray Johnson Hezly Rivera
Senior Men
Individual all-around	Brody Malone	Donnell Whittenburg	Asher Hong
Floor	Brody Malone	Asher Hong	Fred Richard
Pommel horse	Stephen Nedoroscik	Brody Malone	Yul Moldauer
Rings	Donnell Whittenburg	Alex Diab	Asher Hong
Vault	Asher Hong	Donnell Whittenburg	Colt Walker
Parallel bars	Curran Phillips	Colt Walker	Blake Sun
Horizontal bar	Brody Malone	Fred Richard	Shane Wiskus
Junior Men (17-18)
Individual all-around	David Shamah	Alexandru Nitache	Chase Davenport-Mills
Junior Men (15-16)
Individual all-around	Kai Uemura	Kiran Mandava	Preston Ngai

== Women's National Team ==
The top eight senior women in the all-around were added to the national team: Konnor McClain, Shilese Jones, Jordan Chiles, Kayla DiCello, Jade Carey, Skye Blakely, Lexi Zeiss, and Elle Mueller.

== Men's National Team ==
The top seven in the all-around (Brody Malone, Donnell Whittenburg, Asher Hong, Fred Richard, Yul Moldauer, Colt Walker, and Shane Wiskus) were named to the national team. Additionally the remaining event champions, Stephen Nedoroscik (pommel horse) and Curran Phillips (parallel bars) were also named to the national team. Paul Juda, who did not compete, was added via petition. The selection committee then added the remaining members: Taylor Burkhart, Alex Diab, Ian Lasic-Ellis, Riley Loos, and Blake Sun.

== Participants ==
=== Women ===
==== Seniors ====
- Ciena Alipio (Midwest Gymnastics Center)
- Skye Blakely (WOGA Gymnastics)
- Charlotte Booth (Brandy Johnson's Global Gymnastics)
- Jade Carey (Oregon State University)
- Jordan Chiles (World Champions Centre)
- Kayla DiCello (Hill's Gymnastics)
- Amelia Disidore (Great American Gymnastics Express)
- Addison Fatta (Prestige Gymnastics)
- Olivia Greaves (World Champions Centre)
- Shilese Jones (Ascend Gymnastics Center)
- Katelyn Jong (Metroplex Gymnastics)
- Levi Jung-Ruivivar (Twin City Twisters)
- Nola Matthews (Airborne Gymnastics Training Center)
- Konnor McClain (WOGA Gymnastics)
- Elle Mueller (Twin City Twisters)
- Marissa Neal (Great American Gymnastics Express)
- Brooke Pierson (WOGA Gymnastics)
- Joscelyn Roberson (North East Texas Elite Gymnastics)
- Katelyn Rosen (Twin City Twisters)
- Leanne Wong (Great American Gymnastics Express)
- Lexi Zeiss (Twin City Twisters)

==== Juniors ====
- Sage Bradford (WOGA Gymnastics)
- Dulcy Caylor (World Champions Centre)
- Payton Chandler (Metroplex Gymnastics)
- Norah Christian (Cascade Elite West)
- Nicole Desmond (First State Gymnastics)
- Kieryn Finnell (Rochester Gymnastics Academy)
- Jayla Hang (Pacific Reign Gymnastics)
- Gabrielle Hardie (Twin City Twisters)
- Madray Johnson (WOGA Gymnastics)
- Avery King (WOGA Gymnastics)
- Myli Lew (San Mateo Gymnastics)
- Annalisa Milton (Great American Gymnastics Express)
- Malea Milton (Great American Gymnastics Express)
- Zoey Molomo (Metroplex Gymnastics)
- Ella Murphy (WOGA Gymnastics)
- Ella Kate Parker (WOGA Gymnastics)
- Claire Pease (WOGA Gymnastics)
- Michelle Pineda (Metroplex Gymnastics)
- Christiane Popovich (Midwest Gymnastics Center)
- Hezly Rivera (WOGA Gymnastics)
- Simone Rose (Pacific Reign Gymnastics)
- Lacie Saltzmann (Texas Dreams)
- Audrey Snyder (First State Gymnastics)
- Izzy Stassi (Gym X-Treme)
- Tiana Sumanasekera (West Valley Gymnastics School)
- Gabby Van Frayen (Gym X-Treme)
- Kelise Woolford (Buckeye Gymnastics)
- Alicia Zhou (Love Gymnastics)

=== Men ===
==== Seniors ====
- Justin Ah Chow (Ohio State University)
- Javier Alfonso (University of Michigan)
- Michael Artlip (Penn State University)
- Maxim Bereznev (Roswell Gymnastics)
- Jeremy Bischoff (Stanford University)
- Landon Blixt (University of Michigan)
- Cameron Bock (University of Michigan)
- Garrett Braunton (U.S. Air Force Academy)
- Taylor Burkhart (Stanford University)
- Taylor Christopulos (University of Nebraska)
- Asher Cohen (University of Nebraska)
- Matt Cormier (Penn State University)
- Alex Diab (U.S. Olympic and Paralympic Training Center)
- Isaiah Drake (U.S. Naval Academy)
- Will Fleck (Penn State University)
- Colin Flores (West Coast Olympic Gymnastics Academy)
- Vitaliy Guimaraes (University of Oklahoma)
- Dallas Hale (Cypress Academy of Gymnastics)
- Asher Hong (Cypress Academy of Gymnastics)
- Patrick Hoopes (U.S. Air Force Academy)
- Evan Hymanson (Stanford Boys Gymnastics)
- Michael Jaroh (Penn State University)
- Joshua Karnes (Penn State University)
- Anthony Koppie (Roswell Gymnastics)
- Ian Lasic-Ellis (Stanford University)
- Toby Liang (Roswell Gymnastics)
- Riley Loos (Stanford University)
- Brody Malone (Stanford University)
- Connor McCool (University of Illinois)
- Caleb Melton (Penn State University)
- Yul Moldauer (5280 Gymnastics)
- Stephen Nedoroscik (Penn State University)
- Kameron Nelson (Ohio State University)
- Noah Newfeld (University of California - Berkeley)
- Eddie Penev (U.S. Olympic and Paralympic Training Center)
- Curran Phillips (Stanford University)
- Fred Richard (Massachusetts Elite Gymnastics Academy)
- Noah Sano (University of California - Berkeley)
- Garrett Schooley (EVO Gymnastics)
- Daniel Simmons (University of Oklahoma)
- Landon Simpson (Centre Elite Gymnastics)
- Ian Skirkey (University of Illinois)
- Blake Sun (Stanford University)
- Colt Walker (Stanford University)
- Donnell Whittenburg (Salto Gymnastics)
- Shane Wiskus (U.S. Olympic and Paralympic Training Center)
- Khoi Young (Stanford University)
