= Vitaliy Guimaraes =

American-Brazilian gymnast (born 2000)

- Full name: Vitaliy Kondratov Guimaraes
- Born: May 18, 2000 (age 26) Dallas, Texas, US

Gymnastics career
- Discipline: Men's artistic gymnastics
- Country represented: Brazil; (2025–present)
- Former countries represented: United States (2016–2022)
- College team: Oklahoma Sooners (2019–2023)
- Club: Minas Tênis Clube; 5280 Gymnastics (former)
- Head coach: Ricardo Yokoyama
- Former coaches: Vladimir Artemev; Mark Williams
Medal record
Men's artistic gymnastics
Representing United States
Pan American Championships
Silver medal – second place	2021 Rio de Janeiro	Team
Representing Brazil
Pan American Championships
Bronze medal – third place	2026 Rio de Janeiro	Floor exercise
South American Games
Gold medal – first place	2026 Santa Fe	Team

Vitaliy Kondratov Guimaraes (born May 18, 2000) is an American artistic gymnast currently representing Brazil in international competition. As part of the USA national team, he was a member of the silver medal-winning team at the 2021 Pan American Championships. He competed for the University of Oklahoma in collegiate gymnastics.

== Early life and education ==
Guimaraes was born in Dallas, Texas, to Tatiana Kondratova, a former Soviet artistic gymnast, and Marcelo Guimarães, a former Brazilian gymnast and coach. He was raised in Arvada, Colorado.

== Gymnastics career ==
=== Representing the United States ===
In 2016, Guimaraes competed at the RD761 International Junior Team Cup; his team finished fourth. He competed at his first elite-level national championships later that year where he finished sixth in the all-around in the 15-16 age division. Guimaraes was selected to compete at the 2016 Junior Pan American Championships where he helped the United States finish first as a team. Individually, he placed first on floor exercise, second on horizontal bar, and third on vault.

In 2017, Guimaraes competed at the U.S. National Championships in the 17–18 age division. He finished second in the all-around behind Brody Malone. Additionally, he posted top-3 finishes on all apparatuses except the parallel bars where he finished seventh. At the 2018 U.S. National Championships Guimaraes once again competed in the 17–18 age division. He placed fourth in the all-around but first on floor exercise and vault.

Guimaraes became age-eligible for senior level competition in 2019; he made his senior debut at the 2019 Winter Cup where he placed 22nd in the all-around. He also started competing in collegiate gymnastics for the Oklahoma Sooners. At his first NCAA Championships he helped Oklahoma finish second as a team behind Stanford.

In 2020 the NCAA season was cut short due to the ongoing COVID-19 pandemic. Guimaraes returned to competition at the 2021 Winter Cup where he finished ninth in the all-around. He next competed at the 2021 NCAA Championships where he helped Oklahoma once again finish second behind Stanford. Individually he placed fourth in the all-around and on horizontal bar. Guimaraes was selected to compete at the 2021 Pan American Championships; he helped the team win the silver medal behind Brazil. Due to competing at the Pan American Championships, Guimaraes was invited to compete at the upcoming Olympic Trials. Guimaraes finished eleventh in the all-around at the Olympic Trials and was not added to the team.

Guimaraes competed at the 2022 Winter Cup where he won the competition. This was the first competition that utilized bonus points based on difficulty scores. Despite not gaining any of these bonuses, Guimaraes managed to post the highest score due to clean execution. At the conclusion of the competition, Guimaraes was selected to compete at the DTB Pokal Team Challenge where he helped the United States finish first as a team. At the 2022 NCAA Championship Guimaraes helped Oklahoma finish second as a team. Additionally, he placed third on floor exercise.

=== Representing Brazil ===
In February 2024, 5280 Gymnastics teammate Yul Moldauer posted on Instagram that Guimaraes was continuing his professional gymnastics in Brazil. In March 2024, on the Roda de Ginástica podcast, Guimaraes confirmed he had looked at changing nationalities to Brazil in 2022, which was something his parents wanted him to do. He competed at the 2024 Brazil Trophy and won a gold on the floor exercise and a silver on the pommel horse.

In early 2025, Guimaraes' nationality change was confirmed by the International Gymnastics Federation. He made his international debut for Brazil at the 2025 Pan American Championships where he helped Brazil finish fourth as a team. Later that year Guimaraes was selected to represent Brazil at the 2025 World Championships, marking his first World Championships appearance for any country.

At the 2026 Pan American Championships, Guimaraes helped Brazil place fourth as a team. Individually he won bronze on floor exercise behind Jorge Vega and Ángel Barajas.

== Competitive history ==
Competitive history of Vitaliy Guimaraes representing the United States
Year	Event	Team	AA	FX	PH	SR	VT	PB	HB
2016	RD761 International Junior Team Cup	4							3rd place, bronze medalist(s)
2016	U.S. National Championships (15-16)		6	12	7	7	2nd place, silver medalist(s)	24	12
2016	Junior Pan American Championships	1st place, gold medalist(s)		1st place, gold medalist(s)			3rd place, bronze medalist(s)		2nd place, silver medalist(s)
2017	Elite Team Cup		4						
2017	U.S. National Championships (17-18)		2nd place, silver medalist(s)	2nd place, silver medalist(s)	3rd place, bronze medalist(s)	3rd place, bronze medalist(s)	1st place, gold medalist(s)	7	2nd place, silver medalist(s)
2018	Elite Team Cup	6							
2018	U.S. National Championships (17-18)		4	1st place, gold medalist(s)	7	6	1st place, gold medalist(s)	10	5
2019	Winter Cup		22	5	15		9		
2019	NCAA Championships	2nd place, silver medalist(s)		24			4		
2021	Winter Cup		9	12	10	10	9	8	5
2021	NCAA Championships	2nd place, silver medalist(s)	4						4
2021	Pan American Championships	2nd place, silver medalist(s)							
2021	Olympic Trials		11	9	10	15	4	15	11
2022	Winter Cup		1st place, gold medalist(s)						
2022	DTB Pokal Team Challenge	1st place, gold medalist(s)							
2022	MPSF Championships	2nd place, silver medalist(s)	4						
2022	NCAA Championships	2nd place, silver medalist(s)	4	3rd place, bronze medalist(s)	5	27	20	12	22
2023	MPSF Championships	2nd place, silver medalist(s)		5		11	7		16
2023	NCAA Championships	4	11	29	27	38	29	35	44

Competitive history of Vitaliy Guimaraes representing Brazil
Year	Event	Team	AA	FX	PH	SR	VT	PB	HB
2024	Brazil Trophy			1st place, gold medalist(s)	2nd place, silver medalist(s)				4
2024	Brazilian Championships		6		2nd place, silver medalist(s)	4			
2025	Houston National Invitational		1st place, gold medalist(s)						
2025	Pan American Championships	4							
2025	World Championships				40				
2026	American Cup	7							
2026	DTB Pokal Team Challenge	8		2nd place, silver medalist(s)					
2026	Pan American Championships	4		3rd place, bronze medalist(s)					
2026	South American Games	1st place, gold medalist(s)							
2026	World Championships	19							

== See also ==
- Nationality changes in gymnastics
