= Claire Pease =

American artistic gymnast (born 2009)

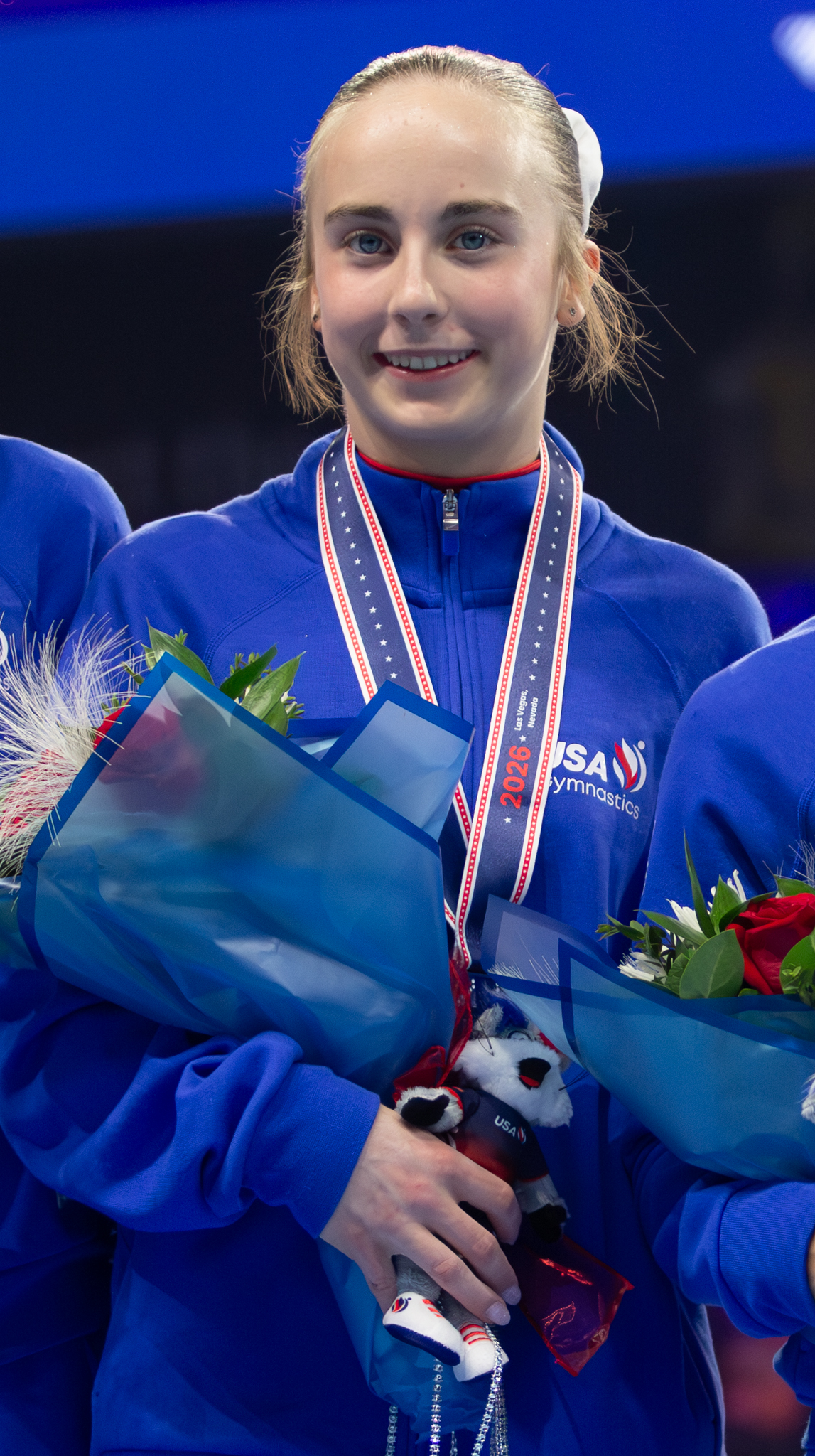
- Pease at the 2026 American Cup

Personal information
- Full name: Claire Elizabeth Pease
- Born: January 5, 2009 (age 17) Honolulu, Hawaii, U.S.

Gymnastics career
- Country represented: United States; (2023–present)
- College team: Utah Red Rocks (2028–2031)
- Club: World Olympic Gymnastics Academy
- Head coach: Valeri Liukin
- Assistant coach: Anna Liukin
Medal record
Women's artistic gymnastics
Representing United States
World Championships
Gold medal – first place	2026 Rotterdam	Floor exercise
Silver medal – second place	2026 Rotterdam	Team
Silver medal – second place	2026 Rotterdam	Vault
Pan American Championships
Gold medal – first place	2026 Rio de Janeiro	Team
Gold medal – first place	2026 Rio de Janeiro	All-around
Gold medal – first place	2026 Rio de Janeiro	Floor exercise
Bronze medal – third place	2026 Rio de Janeiro	Vault
FIG World Cup
Event / 1st / 2nd / 3rd; Apparatus World Cup / 1 / 3 / 0

Claire Elizabeth Pease (born January 5, 2009) is an American artistic gymnast. She is the 2026 World floor exercise gold medalist and vault silver medalist, as well as the 2026 Pan American all-around, floor exercise, and team champion.

== Early life ==
Pease was born to John and Mindy Pease in Honolulu, Hawaii, where her family was stationed while in the military. Her family then relocated to the Dallas area, where she became involved in recreational gymnastics at a local gym.

== Junior gymnastics career ==
=== HOPEs ===
In 2021, Pease was part of the USA Gymnastics HOPEs program. She competed at the 2021 Hopes Classic where she won gold in all four apparatus en route to the all-around title. The following month she competed at the 2021 GK Hopes Championships where she won gold on vault, balance beam, floor exercise and in the all-around, and silver on uneven bars. She scored 50.050 in the all-around, a full two points ahead of runner-up Tyler Turner.

=== 2022 ===
In January, she was invited to attend the women's national team camp. The following month she competed at the 2022 Winter Cup where she finished in fifth on vault and eighth on balance beam.

In July, she competed at the 2022 U.S. Classic where she finished in fourth on floor exercise, seventh on vault, and eighth on balance beam and in the all-around. The following month she competed at the 2022 National Championships where she finished in eighth on uneven bars and ninth on vault.

=== 2023 ===
Pease competed at the 2023 Winter Cup where she won bronze on balance beam and finished in eighth in the all-around.

In July, she competed at the American Classic, where she won gold on balance beam, bronze in the all-around and finished in fourth on uneven bars. The following month she competed at the 2023 U.S. Classic where she finished fourth on balance beam. She was then named to the roster for the 2023 National Championships.

In November, she competed at the Tournoi International where she won gold in the team event, uneven bars and balance beam, and silver on the vault and in the all-around.

=== 2024 ===
In February, she competed at the 2024 Winter Cup where she won gold on uneven bars, balance beam, and in the all-around. She also scored a 13.200 on vault and a 11.700 on floor exercise. The next month she competed at the International Gymnix where she won gold in the team event and uneven bars, and bronze in the all-around, vault and floor exercise.

In April, she competed at the 2024 City of Jesolo Trophy, where she helped team USA win gold in the team event and uneven bars, silver on balance beam and bronze in the all-around.

In May, she competed at the 2024 U.S. Classic, where she won gold on uneven bars, balance beam, and in the all-around, and silver on floor exercise. She scored 53.900 in the all-around, over two points ahead of second place. She then competed at the 2024 National Championships, where she won gold on uneven bars, balance beam, and in the all-around, and finished in fourth on floor exercise.

== Senior gymnastics career ==
=== 2025 ===
Pease became age-eligible for senior level competition in 2025. She made her senior debut at the 2025 Winter Cup where she placed tenth in the all-around but won gold on balance beam. Pease made her international senior debut at the Antalya World Cup. Initially she qualified to the vault, uneven bars, and floor exercise finals and was the first reserve for the balance beam final; however after Gréta Mayer of Hungary withdrew Pease was able to compete in the final. She won gold on balance beam and silver on the other three apparatuses.

In April, she competed at the 2025 City of Jesolo Trophy, where she helped team USA win silver in the team event, all-around, and uneven bars, and placed fourth on vault and fifth on balance beam.

=== 2026 ===
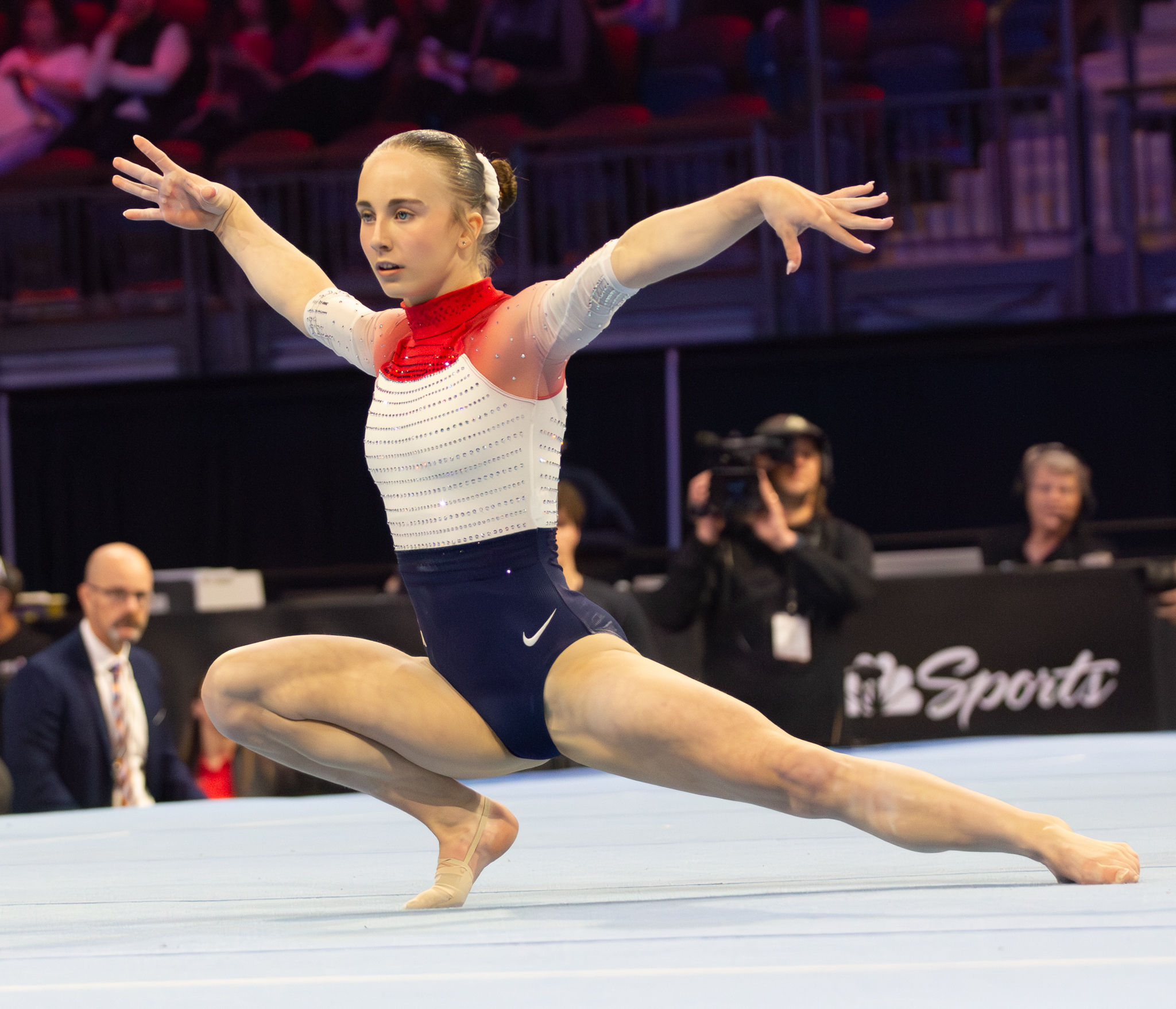
Pease at the 2026 American Cup

Pease again competed at the 2026 Winter Cup, where she won silver on vault and balance beam, bronze in the all-around and placed fourth on uneven bars and seventh on floor exercise. Following her performance, she was selected to represent the United States at the 2026 American Cup, alongside Charleigh Bullock and Hezly Rivera. At the 2026 American Cup, Pease, Bullock, and Rivera competed for the USA alongside Asher Hong, Yul Moldauer, and Danila Leykin. She performed routines on uneven bars and floor exercise, contributing to the United States' silver-medal finish.

On May 16, 2026, she was selected to represent the United States at the 2026 Pan American Championships. At the competition she helped the USA win gold as a team. Individually she qualified for the all-around, vault, uneven bars, and floor exercise event finals. During the all-around final she won gold with a score of a 54.498. During event finals she won gold on floor exercise with a score of 13.833 and bronze on vault with a score 13.916. She finished fifth on uneven bars with a score of 12.566.

Pease at the 2026 U.S. National Championships

In August, she competed at the 2026 U.S. Championships where she won silver in the all-around behind Rivera. She also won the national title on uneven bars, as well as silver on vault and balance beam.

In September, she participated in the USA Gymnastics team selection camp for the 2026 World Championships. During selection camp, she had the top all-around score of 56.700, and had a combined total of 78.340 based on her scores at the event and at the National Championships the previous month. She was subsequently named to the team on the first day of competition, having earned an automatic berth alongside Bullock. She was later joined by Skye Blakely, Rivera, Reese Esponda, and alternate Dulcy Caylor who would eventually be subbed in for Rivera.

At the World Championships, Pease helped the United States qualify to the team final and individually, she qualified to the all-around, vault, and floor exercise finals. During the team final, she contributed scores on all four apparatuses towards the United States' silver medal finish. Her total score of 56.099 was the highest all-around score recorded on any day of the meet. In the all-around competition she placed seventh. On the first day of event finals, she won silver on vault behind Rebeca Andrade of Brazil. The next day, she won gold on floor exercise with a score of 13.866, ahead of teammate Reese Esponda and Maïana Prat of France. At 17 years and 285 days old, she became the youngest American to win an individual world title since Morgan Hurd won the all-around in 2017. She also became the first American to win individual gold in her World Championships debut since Hurd.

== Competitive history ==
Competitive history of Claire Pease at the junior level
Year	Event	Team	AA	VT	UB	BB	FX
2021	HOPEs Classic		1st place, gold medalist(s)	1st place, gold medalist(s)	1st place, gold medalist(s)	1st place, gold medalist(s)	1st place, gold medalist(s)
2021	HOPEs Championships		1st place, gold medalist(s)	1st place, gold medalist(s)	2nd place, silver medalist(s)	1st place, gold medalist(s)	1st place, gold medalist(s)
2022	Winter Cup		11	5		8	
2022	U.S. Classic		8	7		8	4
2022	U.S. National Championships		11	9	8		
2023	Winter Cup		8	7	8	3rd place, bronze medalist(s)	
2023	American Classic		3rd place, bronze medalist(s)	12	4	1st place, gold medalist(s)	14
2023	U.S. Classic		13	14	15	4	
2023	Tournoi International	1st place, gold medalist(s)	2nd place, silver medalist(s)	2nd place, silver medalist(s)	1st place, gold medalist(s)	1st place, gold medalist(s)	
2024	Winter Cup		1st place, gold medalist(s)		1st place, gold medalist(s)	1st place, gold medalist(s)	
2024	International Gymnix	1st place, gold medalist(s)	3rd place, bronze medalist(s)	3rd place, bronze medalist(s)	1st place, gold medalist(s)		3rd place, bronze medalist(s)
2024	City of Jesolo Trophy	1st place, gold medalist(s)	3rd place, bronze medalist(s)		1st place, gold medalist(s)	2nd place, silver medalist(s)	
2024	U.S. Classic		1st place, gold medalist(s)		1st place, gold medalist(s)	1st place, gold medalist(s)	2nd place, silver medalist(s)
2024	U.S. National Championships		1st place, gold medalist(s)		1st place, gold medalist(s)	1st place, gold medalist(s)	4

Pease (left) at the 2026 U.S. National Championships

Competitive history of Claire Pease at the senior level
Year	Event	Team	AA	VT	UB	BB	FX
2025	Winter Cup		10	5	16	1st place, gold medalist(s)	22
2025	Antalya World Cup			2nd place, silver medalist(s)	2nd place, silver medalist(s)	1st place, gold medalist(s)	2nd place, silver medalist(s)
2025	City of Jesolo Trophy	2nd place, silver medalist(s)	2nd place, silver medalist(s)	4	2nd place, silver medalist(s)	5	
2025	U.S. Classic		1st place, gold medalist(s)	1st place, gold medalist(s)	3rd place, bronze medalist(s)	3rd place, bronze medalist(s)	4
2025	U.S. National Championships		10	2nd place, silver medalist(s)	10	9	16
2026	Winter Cup		3rd place, bronze medalist(s)	2nd place, silver medalist(s)	4	2nd place, silver medalist(s)	7
2026	American Cup	2nd place, silver medalist(s)					
2026	Pan American Championships	1st place, gold medalist(s)	1st place, gold medalist(s)	3rd place, bronze medalist(s)	5		1st place, gold medalist(s)
2026	U.S. National Championships		2nd place, silver medalist(s)	2nd place, silver medalist(s)	1st place, gold medalist(s)	2nd place, silver medalist(s)	6
2026	World Championships	2nd place, silver medalist(s)	7	2nd place, silver medalist(s)			1st place, gold medalist(s)
