= 2023 NCAA men's gymnastics championship =

Men's Gymnastics Championship

2023 NCAA Men's Gymnastics Championships
- Venue: Rec Hall
- Location: State College, Pennsylvania
- Dates: April 14–15, 2023
- Competitors: Oklahoma; Michigan; Stanford; Nebraska; Ohio State; Penn State; Iowa; Illinois; Navy; California; Army; Air Force; Springfield
- Winning score: 422.458

Champion
- Stanford

The 2023 NCAA Men's Gymnastics Championships was held April 14–15, 2023 at the Rec Center in State College, Pennsylvania.

== NCAA Championship ==
The top three teams from each session advanced to the National Championship.

=== Standings ===
- National Champion: Stanford – 422.458
- 2nd Place: Michigan – 419.889
- 3rd Place: Illinois – 415.590

School	Floor	Pommel horse	Rings	Vault	Parallel bars	High bars	Total
Stanford	70.965	67.366	71.031	73.999	71.098	67.999	422.458
Michigan	70.799	66.365	70.197	72.365	70.998	69.165	419.889
Illinois	69.531	69.798	68.266	72.332	69.298	66.365	415.590
Oklahoma	70.665	67.464	67.966	72.131	68.532	67.266	414.024
Nebraska	70.698	65.166	67.666	71.766	69.833	67.298	412.427
Penn State	68.566	66.565	68.965	71.765	69.832	66.364	412.057

=== Results ===
Rank	Team	Floor (gymnastics)	Pommel horse	Rings (gymnastics)	Vault (gymnastics)	Parallel bars	Horizontal bar	Total
1st place, gold medalist(s)	Stanford	70.965	67.366	71.031	73.999	71.098	67.999	422.458
1st place, gold medalist(s)	Mark Berlaga			13.566				422.458
1st place, gold medalist(s)	Jeremy Bischoff	13.566				14.033		422.458
1st place, gold medalist(s)	Brandon Briones			14.733	14.533			422.458
1st place, gold medalist(s)	Taylor Burkhart	14.300			15.000		14.000	422.458
1st place, gold medalist(s)	J.R. Chou		13.800			14.033	13.900	422.458
1st place, gold medalist(s)	Ian Gunther			14.000		14.266	13.433	422.458
1st place, gold medalist(s)	Asher Hong	14.133	13.000	14.266	15.333	14.200	13.000	422.458
1st place, gold medalist(s)	Nick Kuebler	14.800		14.566				422.458
1st place, gold medalist(s)	Riley Loos	14.166		14.166				422.458
1st place, gold medalist(s)	Zach Martin				14.333			422.458
1st place, gold medalist(s)	Luke McFarland		13.333					422.458
1st place, gold medalist(s)	Brandon Nguyen					14.566	13.300	422.458
1st place, gold medalist(s)	Colt Walker		13.600					422.458
1st place, gold medalist(s)	Khoi Young		13.633		14.800			422.458
2nd place, silver medalist(s)	Michigan	70.799	66.365	70.197	72.365	70.998	69.165	419.889
2nd place, silver medalist(s)	Javier Alfonso	14.033		14.233		13.066		419.889
2nd place, silver medalist(s)	Landen Blixt	14.600	13.500	13.066	14.566	11.300	13.033	419.889
2nd place, silver medalist(s)	Crew Bold			13.766			13.466	419.889
2nd place, silver medalist(s)	Casey Cummings	13.100			14.033			419.889
2nd place, silver medalist(s)	Zach Granados		13.366					419.889
2nd place, silver medalist(s)	Steven Lukasik						13.266	419.889
2nd place, silver medalist(s)	Logan McKeown					14.133		419.889
2nd place, silver medalist(s)	Chris Read			14.066	14.400			419.889
2nd place, silver medalist(s)	Fred Richard	14.800	12.833	14.466	14.466	15.000	14.433	419.889
2nd place, silver medalist(s)	Markus Shears		13.266					419.889
2nd place, silver medalist(s)	Evgeny Siminiuc					14.133	13.700	419.889
2nd place, silver medalist(s)	Virgil Watkins					14.666		419.889
2nd place, silver medalist(s)	David Willett		13.400					419.889
2nd place, silver medalist(s)	David Wolma				14.900			419.889
2nd place, silver medalist(s)	Adam Wooten	14.266		13.666			14.300	419.889
3rd place, bronze medalist(s)	Illinois	69.531	69.798	68.266	72.332	69.298	66.365	415.590
3rd place, bronze medalist(s)	Ashton Anaya			14.800				415.590
3rd place, bronze medalist(s)	Ethan Boder			13.400				415.590
3rd place, bronze medalist(s)	Josh Cook	13.933		13.700	14.000	13.500		415.590
3rd place, bronze medalist(s)	Tate Costa						13.433	415.590
3rd place, bronze medalist(s)	Maksim Farkhadau						13.433	415.590
3rd place, bronze medalist(s)	Michael Fletcher	13.566	12.766	13.500	14.466	13.800	13.233	415.590
3rd place, bronze medalist(s)	Will Hauke		13.333			14.366		415.590
3rd place, bronze medalist(s)	Sebastian Ingersoll		13.966					415.590
3rd place, bronze medalist(s)	Yan Inhaber-Courchesne			13.766				415.590
3rd place, bronze medalist(s)	Evan Manivong	13.666			14.500		13.466	415.590
3rd place, bronze medalist(s)	Kyle Mayotte			12.866			13.333	415.590
3rd place, bronze medalist(s)	Connor McCool	14.533			14.500			415.590
3rd place, bronze medalist(s)	Connor Micklos					13.066		415.590
3rd place, bronze medalist(s)	David Pochinka		13.533			14.566	12.900	415.590
3rd place, bronze medalist(s)	Amari Sewell	13.833			14.866			415.590
3rd place, bronze medalist(s)	Ian Skirkey		15.133					415.590
4	Oklahoma	70.665	67.464	67.966	72.131	68.532	67.266	414.024
4	Alan Camillus			13.700		13.900		414.024
4	Kelton Christiansen						13.400	414.024
4	Brandon Collier		12.733					414.024
4	Emre Dodanli	14.733			14.566	14.333	13.400	414.024
4	Jack Freeman	13.866					13.900	414.024
4	Brigham Frentheway	13.900						414.024
4	Spencer Goodell	14.333		14.033	14.466	12.866		414.024
4	Vitaliy Guimaraes	13.833	13.166	13.000	14.166	13.300	12.033	414.024
4	Zach Nunez		14.333		14.400	14.133	13.300	414.024
4	Mac Seyler		12.966					414.024
4	Morgan Seyler			13.533			13.266	414.024
4	Daniel Simmons			13.700	14.533			414.024
4	Ignacio Yockers		14.266					414.024
5	Nebraska	70.698	65.166	67.666	71.766	69.833	67.298	412.427
5	Taylor Christopulos	14.600	13.500	13.500	14.433	14.400	13.733	412.427
5	Yanni Chronopoulos			12.900		13.800	13.433	412.427
5	Asher Cohen			13.766		14.000		412.427
5	Liam Doherty-Herwitz			13.800		14.033		412.427
5	James Friedman				14.000	13.600		412.427
5	Cooper Giles		13.500					412.427
5	Chris Hiser	14.066		13.700				412.427
5	Luke James	13.766			14.033			412.427
5	Toby Liang		11.133				12.233	412.427
5	Donte McKinney				14.600		14.366	412.427
5	Zachary Tiderman				14.700		13.533	412.427
5	Travis Wong		13.633					412.427
5	Nathan York	14.066	13.400					412.427
6	Penn State	68.566	66.565	68.965	71.765	69.832	66.364	412.057
6	Michael Artlip	13.000			14.166	13.500	13.166	412.057
6	Chase Clingman		13.366					412.057
6	Matt Cormier	14.300	11.266	13.366	14.500	14.466	13.966	412.057
6	Ethan Dick	13.600	13.400		14.066	13.500		412.057
6	Will Fleck	13.800	12.933				12.033	412.057
6	Michael Jaroh		13.633					412.057
6	Josh Karnes	13.866	13.233	13.166	14.733	14.633	13.333	412.057
6	Matthew Underhill			14.233	14.300			412.057
6	Nathaniel Warren			14.000				412.057

== Individual event finals ==
The top-three all-around competitors and top-three individuals on each event who are not members of one of the qualifying teams advanced from each pre-qualifying session to the finals session to compete for individual titles. Finals competition took place on April 15.

=== Medalists ===
Event	Gold	Silver	Bronze
Individual all-around	Fred Richard (Michigan)	Taylor Christopulos (Nebraska)	Asher Hong (Stanford)
Floor	Nick Kuebler (Stanford)	Fred Richard (Michigan)	Kameron Nelson (Ohio State)
Pommel horse	Ian Skirkey (Illinois)	Zach Nunez (Oklahoma)	Ignacio Yockers (Oklahoma)
Rings	Ashton Anaya (Illinois)	Brandon Briones (Stanford)	Donovan Hewitt (Ohio State)
Vault	Asher Hong (Stanford)	Taylor Burkhart (Stanford)	David Wolma (Michigan)
Parallel bars	Fred Richard (Michigan)	Virgil Watkins (Michigan)	Josh Karnes (Penn State)
High bar	Fred Richard (Michigan)	Donte McKinney (Nebraska)	Adam Wooten (Michigan)
