= Taylor Burkhart =

American gymnast (born 2002)

- Full name: Taylor Anthony Burkhart
- Born: September 21, 2002 (age 23) Boca Raton, Florida, U.S.
- Height: 5 ft 6 in (168 cm)

Gymnastics career
- Discipline: Men's artistic gymnastics
- Country represented: United States (2022–present)
- College team: Stanford Cardinal (2022–2025)
- Gym: 5280 Gymnastics
- Head coach: Thom Glielmi
- Assistant coaches: Rubén López; Mitchell Soukup
- Eponymous skills: Burkhart (pommel horse)
Medal record
Men's artistic gymnastics
Representing the United States
Pan American Championships
Gold medal – first place	2022 Rio de Janeiro	Team
Gold medal – first place	2025 Panama City	Team
Bronze medal – third place	2026 Rio de Janeiro	Team
FIG World Cup
Event	1st	2nd	3rd
Apparatus World Cup	1	0	0
World Challenge Cup	0	2	2
Total	1	2	2
- Coaching career

Current position
- Title: Assistant Coach
- Team: Stanford Cardinal
- Conference: MPSF

Coaching career (HC unless noted)
- 2026–present: Stanford (Assistant)

Taylor Anthony Burkhart (born September 21, 2002) is an American artistic gymnast and coach. He is a member of the United States men's national artistic gymnastics team and competed in collegiate gymnastics for Stanford. He was part of the gold medal-winning teams at the 2022 and 2025 Pan American Championships. He became an assistant coach for the Stanford Cardinal starting in the 2026–2027 season.

== Early life and education ==
Burkhart was born on September 21, 2002, in Boca Raton, Florida, to Dale and Robin Burkhart. His hometown is Arvada, Colorado, and he competed at 5280 Gymnastics as a youth. He attended Two Roads Charter before enrolling at Stanford University to pursue gymnastics.

== Gymnastics career ==
=== 2018–2020 ===
Burkhart competed at the 2018 Junior Pan American Championships alongside Brandon Briones, JR Chou, and Isaiah Drake; together they finished first as a team. During event finals he finished seventh on parallel bars and fourth on horizontal bar. He next competed at the 2018 U.S. National Championships in the junior 15–16 division. He placed fourth in the all-around and won gold on horizontal bar.

Burkhart competed at the 2019 Winter Cup where he placed sixth in the all-around and won gold on horizontal bar. In August Burkhart competed at the U.S. National Championships in the 15–16 age division. He finished first in the all-around and on vault and parallel bars and third on horizontal bar.

He did not compete in 2020 due to the global COVID-19 pandemic.

=== 2021–2024 ===
Burkhart became age-eligible for senior competition in 2021. He competed at the 2021 Winter Cup and placed fifteenth in the all-around. At the 2021 U.S. National Championships, Burkhart placed fifteenth in the all-around.

Burkhart placed sixth in the all-around at the 2022 Winter Cup. He began competing for the Stanford Cardinal men's gymnastics team during the 2021–2022 season. At the 2022 NCAA Championship, he helped Stanford defend their national title. Burkhart made his senior international debut in May at the Varna Challenge Cup where he won silver on floor exercise and vault and placed fifth on horizontal bar. He next competed at the Koper Challenge Cup where he won bronze on floor exercise and vault and finished fourth on rings and eighth on horizontal bar.

Burkhart was selected as the alternate for the 2022 Pan American Championships. He won the gold medal alongside the team.

In late July, Burkhart competed at the 2022 U.S. Classic and placed ninth in the all-around. In August he competed at the U.S. National Championships where he finished eighth in all-around.

Burkhart competed at the 2023 NCAA Championship and helped Stanford win their fourth consecutive team title and individually placed second on vault behind Stanford teammate Asher Hong. In August, Burkhart competed at the 2023 Core Hydration Classic. He placed fifteenth overall. Burkhart next competed at the 2023 Xfinity National Championships where he placed twelfth in the all-around but won silver on floor exercise behind Paul Juda.

At the 2024 National Championships, Burkhart placed fourteenth in the all-around. He was not selected to compete at the upcoming Olympic trials.

=== 2025–present ===
Burkhart competed at the 2025 Winter Cup and placed fourth in the all-around. He next competed at the Antalya World Cup where he won gold on floor exercise, earning his first individual international title. At the NCAA Championships, Burkhart helped Stanford finish as runner-up to Michigan. He was selected to represent the United States at the Pan American Championships alongside Asher Hong, Taylor Christopulos, Brandon Dang, Joshua Karnes, and alternate Jun Iwai. During the qualification round Burkhart qualified to the rings, parallel bars, and horizontal bar finals; however he tweaked his back and could not compete during the team final and he had to withdraw from the apparatus finals. Despite this, he still won a gold medal with the team.

On May 11, 2026, Burkhart was selected to represent the United States at the 2026 Pan American Championships. At the competition he helped the USA win bronze as a team and individually he qualified to the parallel bars and horizontal bar event finals where he ultimately finished seventh and sixth respectively. At the 2026 National Championships, Burkhart finished seventh in the all-around.

== Coaching career ==
In August 2026, Burkhart was announced as an assistant coach for the Stanford Cardinal men's gymnastics team, starting in the 2026–2027 season.

== Eponymous skills ==
Burkhart has one named element on the pommel horse.

Gymnastics elements named after Taylor Burkhart
Apparatus	Name	Description	Difficulty (Note: Valid for the 2025–2028 Code of Points)	Added to Code of Points
Pommel horse	Burkhart	Any 3/3 travel in flairs with 1/1 Spindle inside 2 circles	E, 0.5	2022 Varna World Challenge Cup

== Competitive history ==
Competitive history of Taylor Burkhart at the junior level
Year	Event	Team	AA	FX	PH	SR	VT	PB	HB
2018	Elite Team Cup	6							
2018	Pan American Championships	1st place, gold medalist(s)						7	4
2018	U.S. National Championships (15–16)		4	9	8	10	12	4	1st place, gold medalist(s)
2019	Winter Cup		6	8	7	11	13	4	1st place, gold medalist(s)
2019	Elite Team Cup	4							
2019	U.S. National Championships (15–16)		1st place, gold medalist(s)	5	4	8	1st place, gold medalist(s)	1st place, gold medalist(s)	3rd place, bronze medalist(s)

Competitive history of Taylor Burkhart at the senior level
Year	Event	Team	AA	FX	PH	SR	VT	PB	HB
2021	Winter Cup		15	15	19	20	18	17	9
2021	U.S. National Championships		15	11	22	18	19	16	12
2022	Winter Cup		6	11	8	10	7	10	11
2022	MPSF Championships	1st place, gold medalist(s)							
2022	NCAA Championships	1st place, gold medalist(s)			7				
2022	Varna Challenge Cup			2nd place, silver medalist(s)			2nd place, silver medalist(s)		5
2022	Koper Challenge Cup			3rd place, bronze medalist(s)		4	3rd place, bronze medalist(s)		8
2022	Pan American Championships	(gold) (Note: Burkhart was the team USA alternate)							
2022	U.S. Classic		9	3rd place, bronze medalist(s)	29	7	18	11	6
2022	U.S. National Championships		8	6	12	10	5	12	11
2023	MPSF Championships	1st place, gold medalist(s)					1st place, gold medalist(s)		
2023	NCAA Championships	1st place, gold medalist(s)		2nd place, silver medalist(s)					7
2023	U.S. Classic		15	43	60	46	14	10	32
2023	U.S. National Championships		12	2nd place, silver medalist(s)	34	15		25	8
2024	Winter Cup		12	16	27	21		17	5
2024	MPSF Championships	1st place, gold medalist(s)		6		6	6	5	4
2024	NCAA Championships	1st place, gold medalist(s)		17		13			
2024	U.S. National Championships		14	23	11	11		11	10
2025	Winter Cup		4	17	8	4		4	16
2025	Antalya World Cup			1st place, gold medalist(s)			5		4
2025	NCAA Championships	2nd place, silver medalist(s)		4			8		11
2025	Pan American Championships	1st place, gold medalist(s)				WD		WD	WD
2025	U.S. National Championships			11		7		4	1st place, gold medalist(s)
2025	Arthur Gander Memorial		5						
2026
2026	Pan American Championships	3rd place, bronze medalist(s)						7	6
2026	U.S. National Championships		7	8	9	8		12	14
