= Brandon Briones =

American artistic gymnast (born 2001)

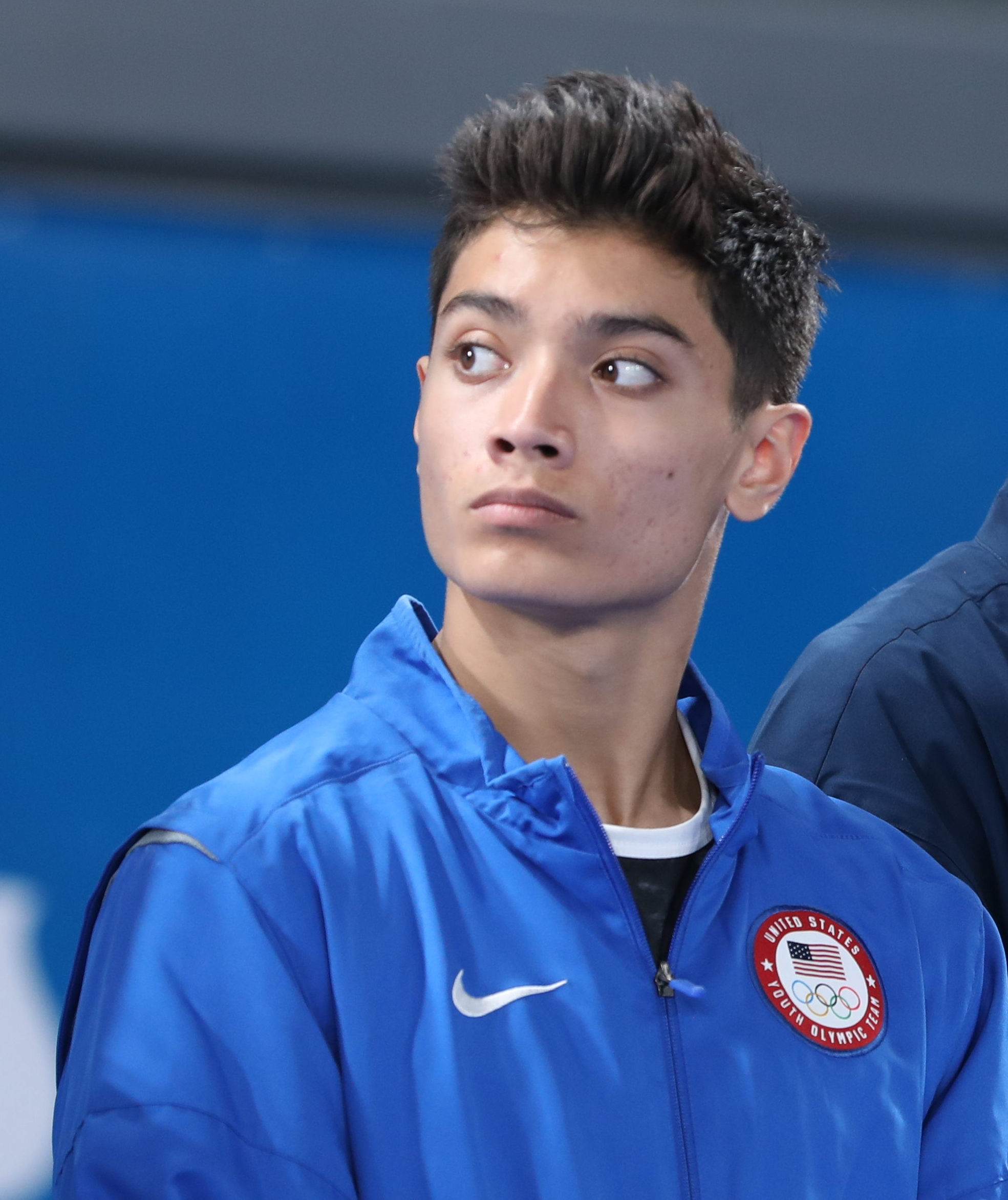
- Briones at the 2018 Summer Youth Olympics

Personal information
- Born: April 29, 2001 (age 25) Park Ridge, Illinois, U.S.
- Height: 5 ft 3 in (160 cm)

Gymnastics career
- Discipline: Men's artistic gymnastics
- Country represented: United States; (2021–2023)
- College team: Stanford Cardinal (2020–2023)
- Gym: USA Flairs; Aspire Junior Sun Devils
- Head coach: Thom Glielmi
- Assistant coach: Grant Breckenridge
Medal record
Men's artistic gymnastics
Event	1st	2nd	3rd
Youth Olympic Games	1	0	1
Total	1	0	1
Representing United States
Youth Olympic Games
Gold medal – first place	2018 Buenos Aires	Vault
Representing International Olympic Committee Mixed-NOCs
Youth Olympic Games
Bronze medal – third place	2018 Buenos Aires	Mixed team
- Last updated on: 17:00, 27 June 2025 (UTC).

Brandon Briones (born April 29, 2001) is an American artistic gymnast. He was a member of the United States men's national artistic gymnastics team and is the 2018 Youth Olympic vault champion. Briones was an alternate for the 2020 Olympic men's gymnastics team.

== Early life and education ==
Briones was born in Park Ridge, Illinois to Laurie and Deo Briones; he grew up in Gilbert, Arizona. He attended Gilbert High School before enrolling at Stanford University.

== Gymnastics career ==
=== Junior: 2017–2018 ===
Briones competed at the RD761 International Junior Team Cup in 2017, where he helped the USA place third as a team. Individually, he placed second in the all-around behind Shiga Tachibana of Japan. During event finals he won silver on floor exercise, pommel horse, and rings and won bronze on parallel bars and horizontal bar. Briones next competed at the 2017 Winter Cup where he placed tenth in the all-around, competing against both junior and senior athletes. Briones competed at the 2017 Junior Olympic National Championships, where he won gold in the all-around. In June Briones broke his leg and was unable to compete for the remainder of the season.

Briones returned to competition at the 2018 Elite Team Cup, where his region placed second. In June, Briones competed at the 2018 Junior Pan American Championships where he helped the USA finish first as a team, and individually Briones won gold in the all-around. At the U.S. National Championships Briones placed first in the junior division (17–18). Additionally, he placed first on rings and horizontal bar, third on floor exercise, pommel horse, and parallel bars, and sixth on vault.

Briones was later selected to represent the United States at the 2018 Summer Youth Olympics held in Buenos Aires, Argentina. At the Youth Olympic Games Briones won gold on vault. Additionally, he placed fourth in the all-around, rings, and horizontal bar, and fifth on floor exercise and pommel horse.

In November, Briones signed his National Letter of Intent with Stanford Cardinal men's gymnastics team.

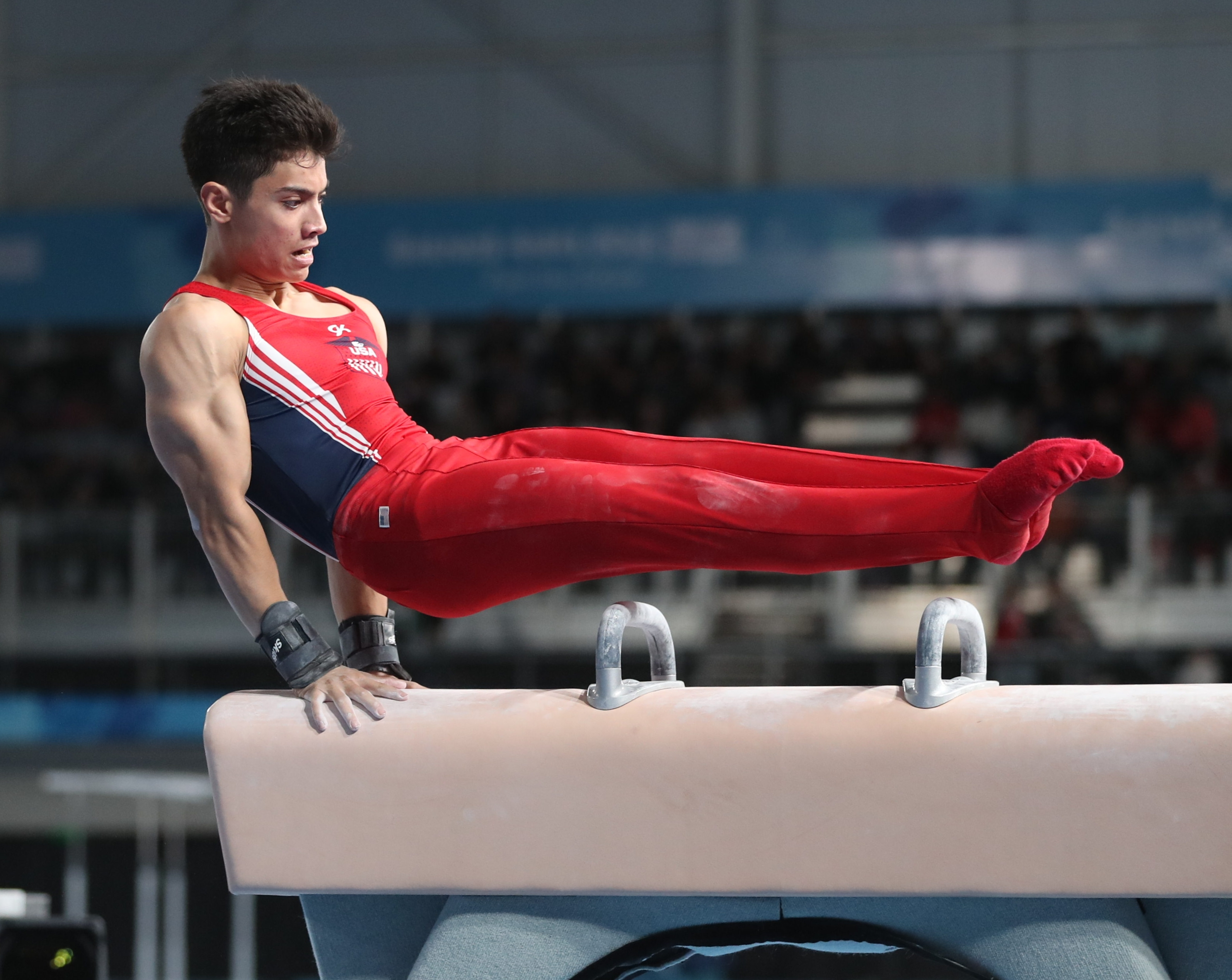
All-Around final

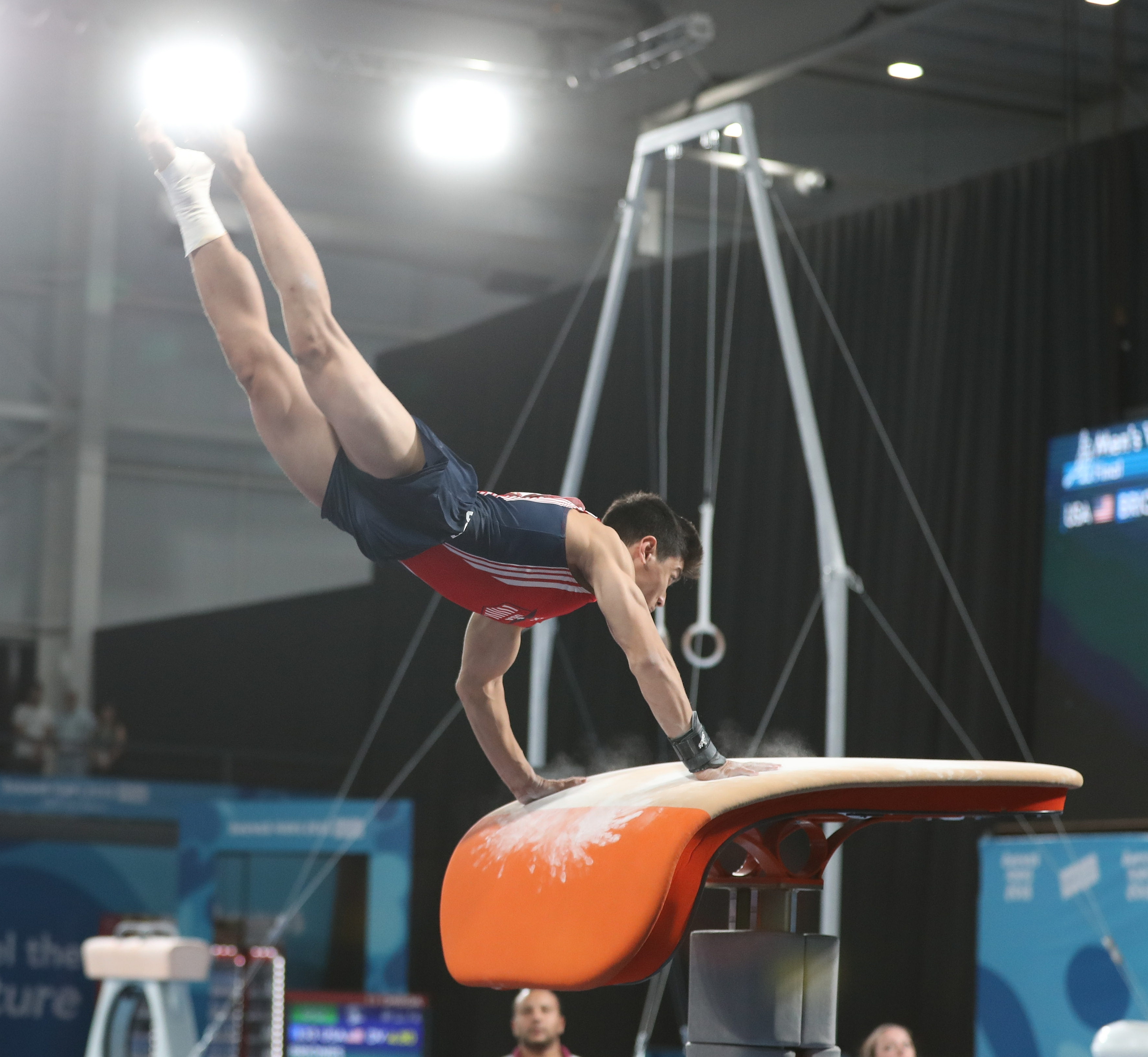
Vault final

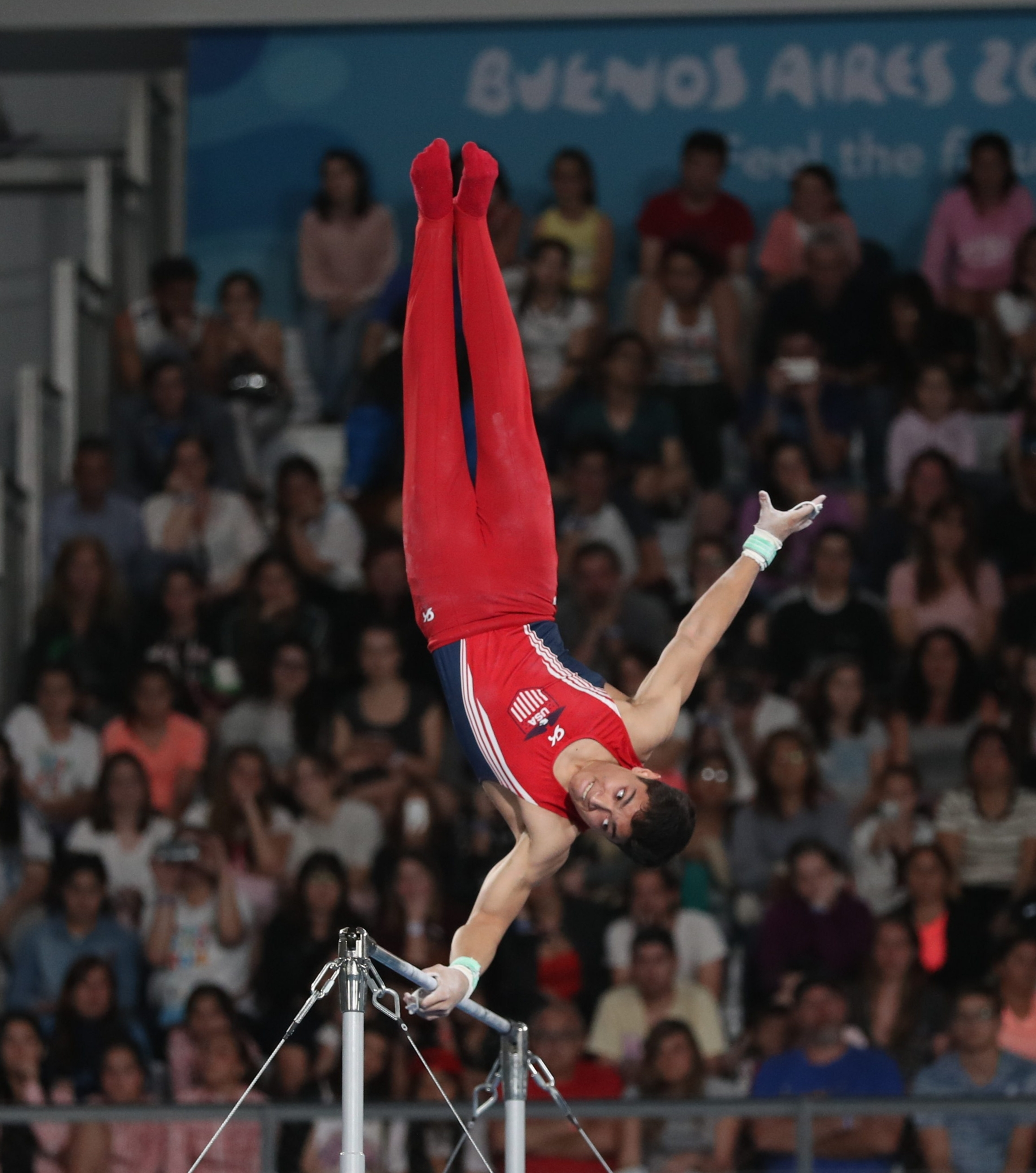
Horizontal bar final

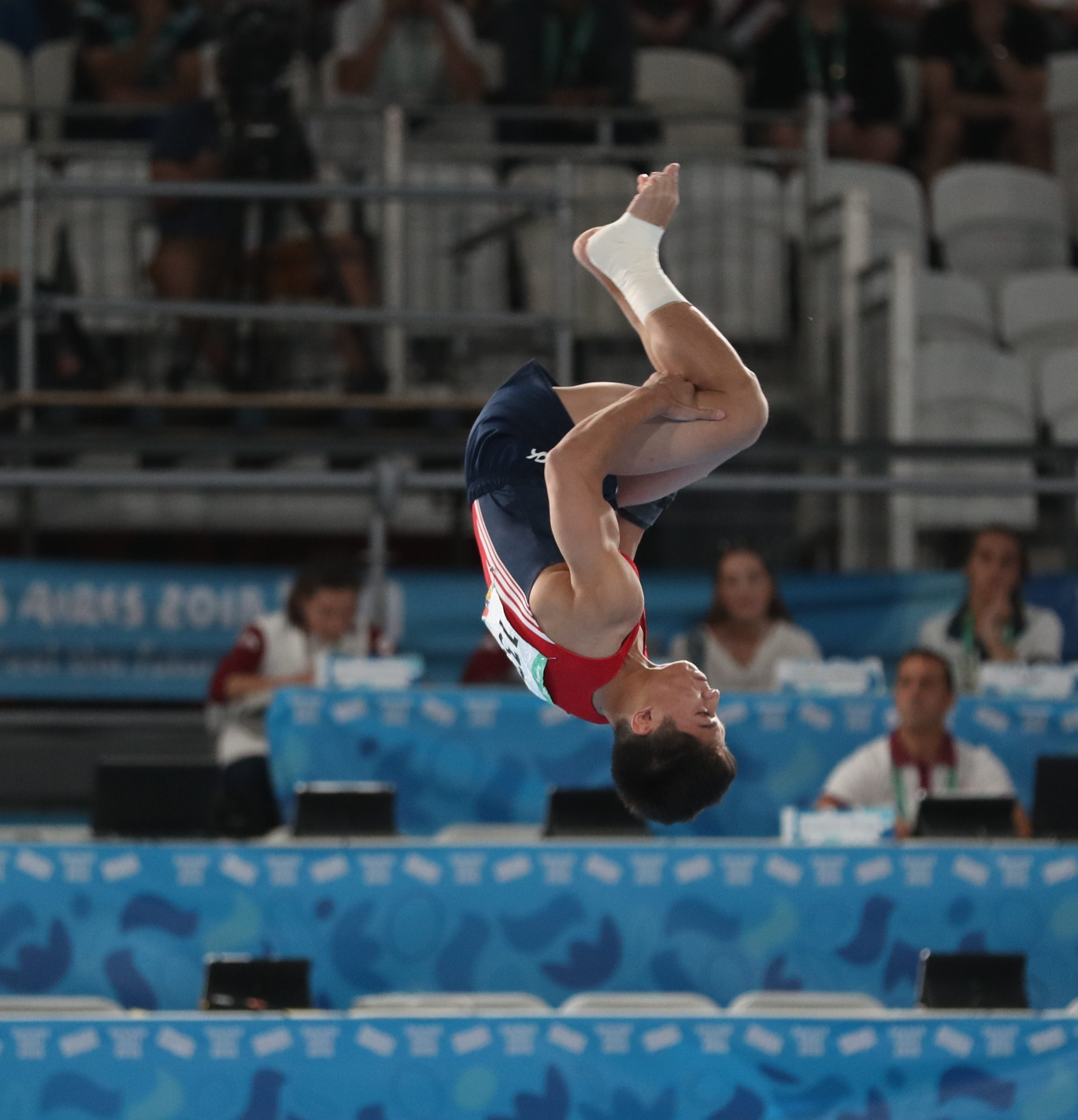
Floor exercise final

Briones at the 2018 Youth Olympics

=== Senior: 2020–2023 ===
Briones began competing for the Stanford Cardinal gymnastics team in 2020; however the NCAA season was cut short due to the ongoing COVID-19 pandemic.

Briones returned to competition at the 2021 NCAA Championships where he helped Stanford defend their team title. Individually he came in third in the all-around behind teammate Brody Malone and Shane Wiskus of Minnesota. At the 2021 U.S. National Championships Briones finished in fourth place behind Malone, Yul Moldauer, and Sam Mikulak. As a result, he qualified to compete at the upcoming Olympic Trials. At the Olympic Trials Briones finished fifth in the all-around. He was named as an alternate for the Olympic team.

Briones returned to competition in early 2023 after not competing in 2022 due to injury. He helped Stanford win their fourth consecutive 2023 National Championship title and individually earned the second-highest score on rings. Briones was a finalist for the Nissen-Emery Award, ultimately losing to Paul Juda. In August Briones competed at the Core Hydration Classic where he placed second on horizontal bar behind Shane Wiskus. Additionally, he placed fifth on rings and sixth on vault.

== Competitive history ==
Competitive history of Brandon Briones
Year	Event	Team	AA	FX	PH	SR	VT	PB	HB
2017	RD761 International Junior Team Cup	3rd place, bronze medalist(s)	2nd place, silver medalist(s)	2nd place, silver medalist(s)	2nd place, silver medalist(s)	2nd place, silver medalist(s)		3rd place, bronze medalist(s)	3rd place, bronze medalist(s)
2017	Winter Cup		10	8	21	17	9	29	11
2017	Elite Cup	1st place, gold medalist(s)	1st place, gold medalist(s)						
2017	Junior Olympic National Championships (JE16)		1st place, gold medalist(s)						
2018	Elite Team Cup	2nd place, silver medalist(s)							
2018	Junior Pan American Championships	1st place, gold medalist(s)	1st place, gold medalist(s)	6	6	2nd place, silver medalist(s)	3rd place, bronze medalist(s)	6	2nd place, silver medalist(s)
2018	Junior Olympic National Championships (JE17)		1st place, gold medalist(s)	2nd place, silver medalist(s)	2nd place, silver medalist(s)	1st place, gold medalist(s)	5	1st place, gold medalist(s)	1st place, gold medalist(s)
2018	U.S. National Championships		1st place, gold medalist(s)	3rd place, bronze medalist(s)	3rd place, bronze medalist(s)	1st place, gold medalist(s)	6	3rd place, bronze medalist(s)	1st place, gold medalist(s)
2018	Youth Olympic Games	3rd place, bronze medalist(s)	4	5	5	4	1st place, gold medalist(s)		4
2019	Elite Team Cup	2nd place, silver medalist(s)							
2021	NCAA Championships	1st place, gold medalist(s)	3rd place, bronze medalist(s)				5		
2021	U.S. National Championships		4	5	10	5	5	9	4
2021	Olympic Trials		5	7	7	7	10	7	6
2023	MPSF Championships	1st place, gold medalist(s)					4		10
2023	NCAA Championships	1st place, gold medalist(s)				2nd place, silver medalist(s)	12		
2023	U.S. Classic					5	6		2nd place, silver medalist(s)
2023	U.S. National Championships					5			3rd place, bronze medalist(s)
