= 2022 NCAA men's gymnastics championship =

Men's Gymnastics Championship

2022 NCAA Men's Gymnastics Championships
- Venue: Lloyd Noble Center
- Location: Norman Oklahoma
- Dates: April 15–16, 2022
- Competitors: Oklahoma; Michigan; Stanford; Nebraska; Ohio State; Penn State; Iowa; Illinois; Navy; California; Army; Air Force; Springfield
- Winning score: 423.628

Champion
- Stanford

The 2022 NCAA Men's Gymnastics Championships was held from April 15–16, 2022 at the Lloyd Noble Center in Norman, Oklahoma.

== National qualifier sessions ==
=== Session 1 ===
The first national qualifier session of the 2022 NCAA Men's Gymnastics Championships took place on April 15, 2022. The following teams competed in Session 1.

- No. 1 Stanford
- No. 4 Nebraska
- No. 6 Illinois
- No. 8 Penn State
- No. 9 California
- No. 12 Springfield

School	Floor	Pommel horse	Rings	Vault	Parallel bars	High bars	Total
Stanford	71.731	69.799	71.465	73.266	71.966	68.098	426.325
Nebraska	68.398	67.465	67.497	72.531	67.765	67.732	411.388
Illinois	69.132	64.099	67.932	70.264	69.465	66.799	406.691
Penn State	68.365	61.664	67.132	70.264	64.265	66.199	397.889
California	66.432	64.599	64.232	68.565	64.798	65.198	394.824
Springfield	64.832	59.431	61.965	67.798	63.498	62.999	380.523

=== Session 2 ===
The second national qualifier session of the 2021 NCAA Men's Gymnastics Championships took place on April 15, 2021. The following teams competed in Session 2.

- No. 2 Oklahoma
- No. 3 Michigan
- No. 5 Ohio State
- No. 7 Navy
- No. 10 Air Force
- No. 11 Army

School	Floor	Pommel horse	Rings	Vault	Parallel bars	High bars	Total
Michigan	68.331	66.498	69.232	70.631	70.332	67.866	412.890
Ohio State	69.232	65.030	68.232	71.032	67.465	66.965	407.956
Oklahoma	70.531	63.432	67.865	70.699	67.731	67.032	407.290
Navy	67.065	64.665	66.565	70.332	65.632	64.764	399.023
Air Force	64.066	60.998	64.597	67.432	65.665	63.064	384.822
Army	65.098	51.466	65.198	67.798	65.232	61.899	376.691

== NCAA Championship ==
The top three teams from each session advanced to the National Championship.

=== Standings ===
- National Champion: Stanford – 423.628
- 2nd Place: Oklahoma – 414.555
- 3rd Place: Michigan – 414.490

School	Floor	Pommel horse	Rings	Vault	Parallel bars	High bars	Total
Stanford	72.433	67.999	71.666	73.432	70.732	67.366	423.628
Oklahoma	71.231	66.298	67.898	71.098	68.165	69.865	414.555
Michigan	70.299	65.998	68.731	71.299	69.932	68.231	414.490
Nebraska	68.830	64.997	66.698	71.798	67.699	66.431	406.453
Ohio State	69.066	62.732	67.198	70.032	65.666	64.632	399.326
Illinois	69.898	59.165	68.898	69.932	66.265	64.365	398.523

=== Results ===
Rank	Team	Floor (gymnastics)	Pommel horse	Rings (gymnastics)	Vault (gymnastics)	Parallel bars	Horizontal bar	Total
1st place, gold medalist(s)	Stanford	72.433	67.999	71.666	73.432	70.732	67.366	423.628
1st place, gold medalist(s)	Mark Berlaga			14.533				423.628
1st place, gold medalist(s)	Taylor Burkhart	14.233	13.700				13.233	423.628
1st place, gold medalist(s)	J.R. Chou						13.200	423.628
1st place, gold medalist(s)	Ian Gunther		12.766	14.200		14.233	13.533	423.628
1st place, gold medalist(s)	Thomas Lee			14.233				423.628
1st place, gold medalist(s)	Riley Loos	14.500		14.600				423.628
1st place, gold medalist(s)	Brody Malone	14.600	14.000	14.100	14.533	12.800	14.700	423.628
1st place, gold medalist(s)	Zach Martin				14.900			423.628
1st place, gold medalist(s)	Bryan Perla	14.800			14.366			423.628
1st place, gold medalist(s)	Curran Phillips				14.700	15.233	12.700	423.628
1st place, gold medalist(s)	Blake Sun		13.733			13.866		423.628
1st place, gold medalist(s)	Colt Walker	14.300				14.600		423.628
1st place, gold medalist(s)	Khoi Young		13.800		14.933			423.628
2nd place, silver medalist(s)	Oklahoma	71.231	66.298	67.898	71.098	68.165	69.865	414.555
2nd place, silver medalist(s)	Fuzzy Benas	13.533	12.633	13.600	14.733	13.700	14.200	414.555
2nd place, silver medalist(s)	Alan Camillus			13.833				414.555
2nd place, silver medalist(s)	Brandon Collier		13.033					414.555
2nd place, silver medalist(s)	Josh Corona				14.266			414.555
2nd place, silver medalist(s)	Emre Dodanli	14.466			14.733			414.555
2nd place, silver medalist(s)	Jack Freeman	14.266					14.266	414.555
2nd place, silver medalist(s)	Raydel Gamboa	14.233	13.033	13.833	14.233	14.066	14.000	414.555
2nd place, silver medalist(s)	Spencer Goodell	14.366		13.566		13.300		414.555
2nd place, silver medalist(s)	Cesar Garcia						14.033	414.555
2nd place, silver medalist(s)	Vitaliy Guimaraes	14.600	13.766	13.433	14.333	13.866	13.366	414.555
2nd place, silver medalist(s)	Zach Nunez		13.833			13.233		414.555
2nd place, silver medalist(s)	Daniel Simmons			13.466	13.033			414.555
3rd place, bronze medalist(s)	Michigan	70.299	65.998	68.731	71.299	69.932	68.231	414.490
3rd place, bronze medalist(s)	Javier Alfonso			14.366		13.266		414.490
3rd place, bronze medalist(s)	Cameron Bock	13.333	13.266	13.266		13.900		414.490
3rd place, bronze medalist(s)	Crew Bold						12.133	414.490
3rd place, bronze medalist(s)	Nick Guy	14.200			14.500			414.490
3rd place, bronze medalist(s)	Paul Juda	14.333	13.033	14.000	15.000	14.366	14.566	414.490
3rd place, bronze medalist(s)	Miles Miller				12.900		13.566	414.490
3rd place, bronze medalist(s)	Jacob Moore	14.633	13.333		14.333			414.490
3rd place, bronze medalist(s)	Lais Najjar	13.800						414.490
3rd place, bronze medalist(s)	Chris Read			13.533				414.490
3rd place, bronze medalist(s)	Markus Shears		13.133					414.490
3rd place, bronze medalist(s)	Evgeny Siminiuc					14.400	13.966	414.490
3rd place, bronze medalist(s)	Virgil Watkins					14.000		414.490
3rd place, bronze medalist(s)	David Willett		13.233					414.490
3rd place, bronze medalist(s)	David Wolma				14.566			414.490
3rd place, bronze medalist(s)	Adam Wooten			13.566			14.000	414.490
4	Nebraska	68.830	64.997	66.698	71.798	67.699	66.431	406.453
4	Taylor Christopulos	14.266	12.866		14.433	13.100	13.733	406.453
4	Liam Doherty-Herwitz			13.500				406.453
4	Charlie Giles	14.166	13.366		14.433			406.453
4	Chris Hiser	13.566						406.453
4	Khalil Jackson		12.933					406.453
4	Dillan King					14.033	13.866	406.453
4	Evan Kriley		13.266					406.453
4	Dylan LeClair	13.466		13.466	13.866	13.933	13.333	406.453
4	Donte McKinney				14.600		13.833	406.453
4	Moritz Mueller			12.966				406.453
4	Sam Phillips	13.366	11.466	13.366	14.466	13.633	11.666	406.453
4	Travis Wong		12.566					406.453
4	Dylan Young			13.400		13.000		406.453
5	Ohio State	69.066	62.732	67.198	70.032	65.666	64.632	399.326
5	Justin Ah Chow	14.233	11.733	12.866	14.433	14.233	13.066	399.326
5	Andrew Brower		13.000			13.533		399.326
5	Curtis Chang		12.533					399.326
5	Trevor Cummings		13.600					399.326
5	Kazuki Hayashi	13.400					12.133	399.326
5	Donovan Hewitt			13.633	13.866		11.866	399.326
5	Jakob Murray	13.800				12.100		399.326
5	Kameron Nelson	13.300		13.433	14.433			399.326
5	Tyler Rockwood			13.300				399.326
5	Dexter Roettker				13.200		13.200	399.326
5	Domenic Sciulli					13.000	13.433	399.326
5	Luke Smigliani		11.866	12.866				399.326
5	Jesse Tyndall	14.333	12.433	13.966	14.100	12.800	14.000	399.326
6	Illinois	69.898	59.165	68.898	69.932	66.265	64.365	398.523
6	Ashton Anaya			14.300				398.523
6	Hamish Carter	14.300	12.800	13.500	14.300	13.500	13.766	398.523
6	Josh Cook	14.200						398.523
6	Michael Fletcher	13.133	12.600	13.433	12.933	11.766	13.033	398.523
6	Will Hauke		9.633			13.633		398.523
6	Sebastian Ingersoll						11.233	398.523
6	Yan Inhaber-Courchesne			13.766				398.523
6	Dylan Kolak	13.466						398.523
6	Jordan Kovach			13.766				398.523
6	Evan Manivong				14.533		13.700	398.523
6	Connor McCool	14.266			14.000			398.523
6	Logan Myers			13.566				398.523
6	David Pochinka		12.166			13.666		398.523
6	Ian Skirkey		11.966					398.523
6	Clay Stephens	13.666			14.166	13.700	12.633	398.523

== Individual event finals ==
The top-three all-around competitors and top-three individuals on each event who are not members of one of the qualifying teams advanced from each pre-qualifying session to the finals session to compete for individual titles. Finals competition took place on April 16.

=== Medalists ===
Event	Gold	Silver	Bronze
Individual all-around	Paul Juda (Michigan)	Brody Malone (Stanford)	Raydel Gamboa (Oklahoma)
Floor	Bryan Perla (Stanford)	Jacob Moore (Michigan)	Brody Malone (Stanford) Vitaliy Guimaraes (Oklahoma)
Pommel horse	Chase Clingman (Penn State) Brody Malone (Stanford)	—	Zach Nunez (Oklahoma)
Rings	Riley Loos (Stanford)	Mark Berlaga (Stanford)	Javier Alfonso (Michigan)
Vault	Paul Juda (Michigan)	Khoi Young (Stanford)	Zach Martin (Stanford)
Parallel bars	Curran Phillips (Stanford)	Colt Walker (Stanford)	Evgeny Siminiuc (Michigan)
High bar	Brody Malone (Stanford)	Paul Juda (Michigan)	Jack Freeman (Oklahoma) Garrett Braunton (Air Force)
