= Cameron Bock =

American artistic gymnast (born 1998)

- Full name: Cameron Matthew Bock
- Born: September 18, 1998 (age 27) Newport Beach, California, U.S.
- Height: 5 ft 4 in (163 cm)
- Spouse: Abby Heiskell (m. 2025)

Gymnastics career
- Discipline: Men's artistic gymnastics
- Country represented: United States; (2018–2019, 2021–2024)
- College team: Michigan Wolverines (2018–2022)
- Gym: SCATS Gymnastics
- Head coach: Yuan Xiao
- Former coach: Kurt Golder
- Retired: June 30, 2024
Medal record
Men's artistic gymnastics
Representing United States
| Event | 1st | 2nd | 3rd |
|---|---|---|---|
| Pan American Games | 1 | 1 | 1 |
| Pan American Championships | 1 | 2 | 3 |
| Pacific Rim Championships | 2 | 2 | 1 |
| Total | 4 | 5 | 5 |
Pan American Games
| Gold medal – first place | 2023 Santiago | Team |
| Silver medal – second place | 2019 Lima | Team |
| Bronze medal – third place | 2019 Lima | Parallel bars |
Pan American Championships
| Gold medal – first place | 2018 Lima | Team |
| Silver medal – second place | 2018 Lima | Pommel horse |
| Silver medal – second place | 2021 Rio de Janeiro | Team |
| Bronze medal – third place | 2018 Lima | All-around |
| Bronze medal – third place | 2018 Lima | Floor |
| Bronze medal – third place | 2018 Lima | Parallel bars |
Pacific Rim Championships
| Gold medal – first place | 2024 Cali | Team |
| Gold medal – first place | 2024 Cali | Rings |
| Silver medal – second place | 2024 Cali | All-around |
| Silver medal – second place | 2024 Cali | Parallel bars |
| Bronze medal – third place | 2024 Cali | Horizontal bar |

Cameron Matthew Bock (born September 18, 1998) is an American former artistic gymnast. He was named a member of the United States men's national artistic gymnastics team in 2018 and competed on the University of Michigan men's gymnastics team from 2018–2022. He was a member of the gold medal winning teams at the 2023 Pan American Games and the 2018 Pan American Championships.

== Early life and education ==
Bock was born on September 18, 1998, in Newport Beach, California, to Nicholas and Jennifer Bock. His hometown is Tustin, California, and he was educated via Connections Academy. He later attended the University of Michigan to pursue gymnastics.

== Gymnastics career ==
Bock won the gold medal in the men's team all-around event at the 2018 Pan American Gymnastics Championships held in Lima, Peru.

In 2019, he competed at the 2019 Winter Cup, placing third on the pommel horse. He also represented the United States at the Pan American Games held in Lima, Peru and he won the bronze medal in the men's parallel bars event. He also won the silver medal in the men's artistic team all-around event.

Bock announced his retirement from gymnastics competition in June 2024 via Instagram following the 2024 United States Olympic trials.

== Personal life ==
Bock announced on Instagram that he married fellow Michigan gymnast Abby Heiskell in September 2025.

== Competitive history ==
Competitive history of Cameron Bock at the junior level
| Year | Event | Team | AA | FX | PH | SR | VT | PB | HB |
|---|---|---|---|---|---|---|---|---|---|
| 2013 | U.S. National Championships (15-16) | | 9 | 8 | 2nd place, silver medalist(s) | 18 | 15 | 4 | 13 |
| 2014 | U.S. National Championships (15-16) | | 9 | 14 | 1st place, gold medalist(s) | 12 | 23 | 4 | 13 |
| 2015 | Junior Japan International | | 3rd place, bronze medalist(s) | | 3rd place, bronze medalist(s) | 7 | 4 | 4 | 5 |
| 2016 | RD761 International Team Cup | 3rd place, bronze medalist(s) | 4 | | | 3rd place, bronze medalist(s) | 6 | 1st place, gold medalist(s) | |
| 2016 | Calgary International Cup | 1st place, gold medalist(s) | | | | | | | |

Competitive history of Cameron Bock at the senior level
| Year | Event | Team | AA | FX | PH | SR | VT | PB | HB |
|---|---|---|---|---|---|---|---|---|---|
| 2017 | Winter Cup | | 26 | 32 | 25 | 33 | 26 | 33 | 34 |
| 2017 | Calgary International Cup | 2nd place, silver medalist(s) | 3rd place, bronze medalist(s) | | 2nd place, silver medalist(s) | 6 | | | |
| 2017 | U.S. National Championships | | 17 | 25 | 12 | 14 | 22 | 15 | 28 |
| 2018 | NCAA Championships | | 10 | | | | | 5 | |
| 2018 | U.S. National Championships | | 7 | 10 | 12 | 10 | 24 | 6 | 8 |
| 2018 | Pan American Championships | 1st place, gold medalist(s) | 3rd place, bronze medalist(s) | 3rd place, bronze medalist(s) | 2nd place, silver medalist(s) | 7 | | 3rd place, bronze medalist(s) | |
| 2019 | Winter Cup | | 10 | 18 | 3rd place, bronze medalist(s) | 6 | 14 | 14 | 5 |
| 2019 | NCAA Championships | 4 | 4 | 12 | 23 | 30 | 27 | 18 | 12 |
| 2019 | Pan American Games | 2nd place, silver medalist(s) | | | | | | 3rd place, bronze medalist(s) | |
| 2020 | Winter Cup | | 13 | 3rd place, bronze medalist(s) | 18 | 6 | 15 | 13 | 20 |
| 2021 | Winter Cup | | 1st place, gold medalist(s) | 6 | 3rd place, bronze medalist(s) | 3rd place, bronze medalist(s) | 4 | 6 | 3rd place, bronze medalist(s) |
| 2021 | NCAA Championships | 3rd place, bronze medalist(s) | 9 | 12 | 25 | 5 | 43 | 5 | 38 |
| 2021 | Pan American Championships | 2nd place, silver medalist(s) | | | | | | | |
| 2021 | Olympic Trials | | 10 | 15 | 5 | 7 | 15 | 4 | 4 |
| 2022 | NCAA Championships | 3rd place, bronze medalist(s) | | 34 | 12 | 34 | | 11 | |
| 2022 | U.S. Classic | | 11 | 11 | 25 | 13 | 22 | 4 | 16 |
| 2022 | U.S. National Championships | | 12 | 14 | 5 | 11 | 30 | 27 | 15 |
| 2023 | Winter Cup | | 10 | 6 | 13 | 15 | 10 | 7 | 6 |
| 2023 | U.S. Classic | | 4 | 15 | 7 | 8 | 18 | 6 | 7 |
| 2023 | U.S. National Championships | | 9 | 15 | 8 | 12 | 7 | 5 | 15 |
| 2023 | Pan American Games | 1st place, gold medalist(s) | 4 | | | 4 | | | 4 |
| 2024 | Winter Cup | | 4 | 9 | 6 | 8 | | 13 | 11 |
| 2024 | DTB Pokal Team Challenge | 1st place, gold medalist(s) | | | | 4 | | | |
| 2024 | Pacific Rim Championships | 1st place, gold medalist(s) | 2nd place, silver medalist(s) | | 4 | 1st place, gold medalist(s) | | 2nd place, silver medalist(s) | 3rd place, bronze medalist(s) |
| 2024 | U.S. National Championships | | 8 | 15 | 5 | 10 | | 12 | 3rd place, bronze medalist(s) |
| 2024 | Olympic Trials | | 8 | 10 | 4 | 9 | | 10 | 6 |
