= Emre Dodanlı =

Turkish artistic gymnast

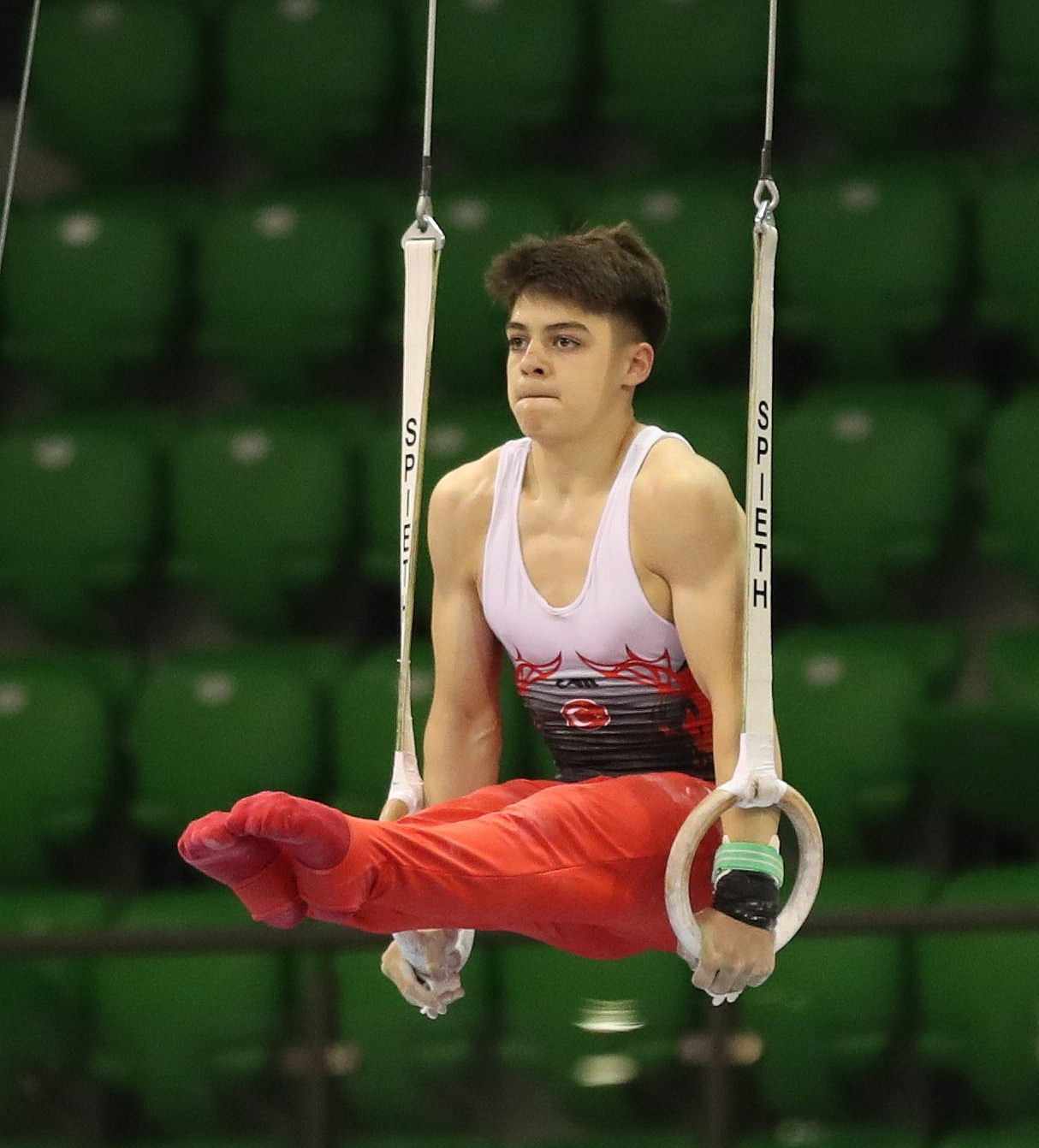
- Dodanlı at the 2019 Junior World Championships

Personal information
- Full name: Emre Dodanlı
- Born: 24 October 2002 (age 23) Eminönü, Turkey

Gymnastics career
- Discipline: Men's artistic gymnastics
- Country represented: Turkey (2018–2019, 2023–2025)
- College team: Oklahoma Sooners (2022–2025)
- Club: East York Gymnastics Club
- Head coach: Mark Williams
Medal record
Men's artistic gymnastics
Representing Oklahoma Sooners
NCAA Championships
Gold medal – first place	2025 Ann Arbor	Horizontal bar
Silver medal – second place	2022 Norman	Team
Bronze medal – third place	2024 Columbus	Team
Bronze medal – third place	2025 Ann Arbor	Team
- Coaching career

Current position
- Title: Assistant coach
- Team: Army Black Knights
- Conference: ECAC

Coaching career (HC unless noted)
- 2026–present: Army (assistant)

Emre Dodanlı (born 24 October 2002) is a Turkish artistic gymnast. He represented Turkey at the 2024 Olympic Games.

== Early life ==
Dodanlı was born in Eminönü in 2002 to Nalan and Berhan Dodanlı. In 2004, his family moved to Milton, Ontario.

== Gymnastics career ==
Dodanlı made his debut for Turkey at the 2018 European Championships where he helped them finish 16th as a team. He next competed at the inaugural Junior World Championships; he finished 38th in the all-around and helped Turkey finish 16th as a team.

Dodanlı began competing in NCAA gymnastics for the Oklahoma Sooners in 2022.

Dodanlı competed at the Turkish Championships in 2023, where he finished second behind Kerem Şener. Later in the year, he competed at the 2023 World Championships where he helped the Turkish team finish tenth during qualifications. Although they did not qualify for the team final, they qualified a full team to the upcoming Olympic Games for the first time in history.

Dodanlı competed at the 2024 European Championships where he helped Turkey finish fourth. In June Dodanlı was selected to represent Turkey at the 2024 Olympic Games alongside Ferhat Arıcan, Adem Asil, İbrahim Çolak, and Ahmet Önder.

== Coaching career ==
In August 2026, Dodanlı became an assistant coach for the Army Black Knights men's gymnastics team.

== Competitive history ==
Competitive history of Emre Dodanlı
Year	Event	Team	AA	FX	PH	SR	VT	PB	HB
2018
2018	Junior European Championships	16							
2019
2019	Junior World Championships	16	38						
2019	European Youth Olympic Festival		18	4					
2022	NCAA Championships	2nd place, silver medalist(s)							
2023	NCAA Championships	4							
2023	Turkish Championships		2nd place, silver medalist(s)	1st place, gold medalist(s)				1st place, gold medalist(s)	1st place, gold medalist(s)
2023	World Championships	10							
2024	NCAA Championships	3rd place, bronze medalist(s)							
2024	European Championships	4							
2024	Turkish Championships		1st place, gold medalist(s)	1st place, gold medalist(s)	4			4	1st place, gold medalist(s)
2024	Olympic Games	9	R3						
2025	NCAA Championships	3rd place, bronze medalist(s)		29			14	13	1st place, gold medalist(s)
