= Steve Hug =

American artistic gymnast

- Full name: Steven Keith Hug
- Born: May 20, 1952 (age 74) Highland, Illinois, U.S.
- Height: 164 cm (5 ft 5 in)

Gymnastics career
- Discipline: Men's artistic gymnastics
- Country represented: United States
- College team: Stanford Cardinal

Steven Keith Hug (born May 20, 1952) is an American former artistic gymnast who was active in the 1960s and 1970s. Hug was a member of the United States men's national artistic gymnastics team and competed in two Olympic Games and the 1974 World Championships.

Born in Highland, Illinois, Hug made his first Olympic team in 1968 at 16 years old, the youngest person to represent the U.S. gymnastics team at the event. He was the first American to reach the Olympic individual all-around finals, in the first Olympics that featured the competition. Hug finished the individual all-around in 36th place, and was a member of the U.S. men's all-around team that posted a seventh-place performance. The following year, he won the all-around gold medal at the national championships, one of three golds he claimed at the event; Hug tied for first in the floor exercise with Dave Thor and won the parallel bars.

Hug spent his senior high school year at a school in Japan while training in gymnastics at Nihon University. He later attended Stanford University, where he won the all-around title at the NCAA Men's Gymnastics Championships three consecutive years from 1972 to 1974 and the parallel bars in 1973 and 1974. At the 1972 Summer Olympics, he reached the individual all-around finals, and ended the competition in 31st place. In addition, Hug was again on the all-around team, which finished 10th in the event. In 1974, Hug received the Nissen-Emery Award as the top senior college gymnast.

Hug is a 1995 inductee into the U.S. Gymnastics Hall of Fame. CrossFit's Greg Glassman has credited him for providing him with "inspiration" while he was growing up.
