= 2023 U.S. Classic =

Gymnastics competition

- Venue: Now Arena
- Location: Hoffman Estates, Illinois
- Dates: August 4–6, 2023
- Website: Core Hydration Classic

The 2023 U.S. Classic, known as the 2023 Core Hydration Classic for sponsorship purposes, was the 39th edition of the U.S. Classic gymnastics competition. The event was held on August 4–6, 2023 at the Now Arena in Hoffman Estates, Illinois.

== Schedule ==
All times are in Central Time Zone.

- Hopes Championship – August 4, 2023 at 2:00 PM
- Junior Women's Gymnastics – August 4, 2023 at 7:00 PM
- Senior Women's Gymnastics (1) – August 5, 2023 at 1:00 PM
- Senior Women's Gymnastics (2) – August 5, 2023 at 7:00 PM
- Men's Gymnastics (1) – August 6, 2023 at 10:45 AM
- Men's Gymnastics (2) – August 6, 2023 at 4:45 PM

== Medalists ==
Event	Gold	Silver	Bronze
Senior Women (Note: The scores of exhibition gymnast Mélanie de Jesus dos Santos would have placed her second in the all-around (56.200) and first on uneven bars (14.850))
All-around	Simone Biles	Leanne Wong	Joscelyn Roberson
Vault	Joscelyn Roberson	Leanne Wong	Skye Blakely
Uneven bars	Zoe Miller	Skye Blakely	Simone Biles
Balance beam	Simone Biles	Sunisa Lee	Skye Blakely Joscelyn Roberson
Floor	Simone Biles	Kaliya Lincoln Joscelyn Roberson	Not awarded
Junior Women
All-around	Kieryn Finnell	Tatum Drusch	Addy Fulcher
Vault	Lailah Danzy Cambry Haynes Izzy Stassi	Not awarded	
Uneven bars	Ally Damelio	Kieryn Finnell	Tyler Turner
Balance beam	Kieryn Finnell	Lacie Saltzmann	Isabella Anzola
Floor	Addy Fulcher	Kieryn Finnell	Isabella Anzola
Senior Men
All-around	Asher Hong	Khoi Young	Paul Juda
Floor	Connor McCool	Asher Hong	Khoi Young
Pommel horse	Stephen Nedoroscik	Khoi Young	Patrick Hoopes
Rings	Asher Hong	Donnell Whittenburg	Javier Alfonso
Vault	Asher Hong	Khoi Young	Paul Juda
Parallel bars	Curran Phillips	Blake Sun	Shane Wiskus
Horizontal bar	Shane Wiskus	Brandon Briones	Paul Juda

== Participants ==
=== Women ===
- Simone Biles (World Champions Centre)
- Skye Blakely (WOGA)
- Charlotte Booth (Brandy Johnson's Global Gymnastics)
- Jade Carey (Oregon State University)
- Dulcy Caylor (World Champions Centre)
- Jordan Chiles (World Champions Centre)
- Chloe Cho (Gymnastics Olympica USA)
- Norah Christian (Cascade Elite West)
- Kayla DiCello (Hill's Gymnastics)
- Amelia Disidore (GAGE)
- Leigh Anne Elliot (World Class Gymnastics)
- Addison Fatta (Prestige)
- Madray Johnson (WOGA)
- ~~Shilese Jones (Ascend Gymnastics)~~
- Katelyn Jong (Metroplex)
- Levi Jung-Ruivivar (WOGA)
- Avery King (Metroplex)
- Sunisa Lee (Midwest Gymnastics)
- Myli Lew (San Mateo Gymnastics)
- Kaliya Lincoln (WOGA)
- Eveylynn Lowe (GAGE)
- Nola Matthews (Airborne Gymnastics)
- Zoe Miller (World Champions Centre)
- Annalisa Milton (GAGE)
- Malea Milton (GAGE)
- Avery Moll (Buckeye Gymnastics)
- Elle Mueller (Twin City Twisters)
- Ella Murphy (WOGA)
- Marissa Neal (GAGE)
- Brooke Pierson (WOGA)
- Michelle Pineda (Metroplex Gymnastics)
- Joscelyn Roberson (World Champions Centre)
- Ashlee Sullivan (WOGA)
- Tiana Sumanasekera (World Champions Centre)
- Leanne Wong (University of Florida)
- Kelise Woolford (Buckeye Gymnastics)
- Lexi Zeiss (Twin City Twisters)
- Alicia Zhou (Love Gymnastics)

Exhibition (Note: Exhibition performance; ineligible for medals.)

- (France) Mélanie de Jesus dos Santos (World Champions Centre)
- (Bulgaria) Paloma Spiridonova (WOGA)

=== Men ===
There were 118 senior men registered. Notable entrants include:

- Fuzzy Benas
- Jeremy Bischoff
- Cameron Bock
- Crew Bold
- Brandon Briones
- Taylor Burkhart
- J.R. Chou
- Matt Cormier
- Alex Diab
- Isaiah Drake
- Jack Freeman
- Ian Gunther
- Dallas Hale
- Asher Hong
- Michael Jaroh
- Paul Juda
- Toby Liang
- Riley Loos
- Connor McCool
- Yul Moldauer
- Stephen Nedoroscik
- Kameron Nelson
- Brandon Nguyen
- Zachary Nunez
- Vahe Petrosyan
- Curran Phillips
- Blake Sun
- Colin Van Wicklen
- Colt Walker
- Donnell Whittenburg
- Shane Wiskus
- Ignacio Yockers
- Khoi Young
