= Grant Breckenridge =

American artistic gymnast

- Full name: Grant Douglas Breckenridge
- Born: April 8, 1997 (age 29) Highland Park, Illinois, U.S.
- Height: 5 ft 8 in (173 cm)

Gymnastics career
- Discipline: Men's artistic gymnastics
- Country represented: United States (2017, 2020–2021)
- College team: Stanford Cardinal (2016–2019)
- Gym: Cypress Academy; Buffalo Grove Gymnastics Center
- Head coach: Thom Glielmi
- Retired: c. 2021
Medal record
Men's artistic gymnastics
Representing United States
Event	1st	2nd	3rd
Pan American Games	0	1	0
Total	0	1	0
Pan American Games
Silver medal – second place	2019 Lima	Team

Grant Douglas Breckenridge (born April 8, 1997) is an American artistic gymnast and coach. He is a former member of the United States men's national artistic gymnastics team.

== Early life and education ==
Breckenridge was born April 8, 1997, in Highland Park, Illinois, to Alexander and Elizabeth Breckenridge. He trained with Buffalo Grove Gymnastics Center. He attended Libertyville High School and later enrolled at Stanford University to pursue gymnastics.

== Gymnastics career ==
In 2019, he represented the United States at the Pan American Games held in Lima, Peru and he won a silver medal in the team event. He also won the silver medal both in the floor exercise and in the men's artistic team all-around event.

Domestically, Breckenridge competed for the Stanford Cardinal men's gymnastics team. He was the 2018 and 2019 NCAA horizontal bar silver medalist and won the 2019 NCAA men's gymnastics championship with Stanford. He also medaled at the 2017, 2018, 2019, and 2020 Winter Cups.

== Coaching career ==
He is currently an assistant coach with Stanford. He was a member of the coaching staff for the United States at the 2024 Summer Olympics.
