= Stanford Cardinal men's gymnastics =

College men's gymnastics

- University: Stanford University
- Athletic director: John Donahoe
- Head coach: Thom Glielmi
- Conference: MPSF
- Location: Stanford, California
- Home arena: Burnham Pavilion
- Nickname: Cardinal
- Colors: Cardinal and white

National championships
- 11 (1992, 1993, 1995, 2009, 2011, 2019, 2021, 2022, 2023, 2024, 2026); NCAA Championships

NCAA Tournament appearances
- 1955, 1964, 1984, 1985, 1986, 1987, 1988, 1989, 1991, 1992, 1993, 1994, 1995, 1996, 1997, 1999, 2000, 2001, 2002, 2003, 2004, 2005, 2006, 2007, 2008, 2009, 2010, 2011, 2012, 2013, 2014, 2015, 2016, 2017, 2018, 2019, 2021, 2022, 2023, 2024, 2025, 2026

The Stanford Cardinal men's gymnastics team represents Stanford University and competes in the Mountain Pacific Sports Federation. The team has won 11 NCAA National Championships, most recently in 2026.

== Top NCAA Championship finishes ==
NCAA Championship results
Year	Finish	Score
1986	3rd	
1989	4th	
1991	5th	
1992	1st	
1993	1st	
1994	2nd	
1995	1st	
1996	3rd	
1991	6th	
2002	6th	
2006	3rd	
2007	3rd	218.450
2008	2nd	362.750
2009	1st	362.800
2010	2nd	359.800
2011	1st	363.450
2012	5th	352.650
2013	3rd	436.150
2014	3rd	436.300
2015	2nd	440.450
2016	2nd	434.050
2017	4th	421.500
2018	4th	408.725
2019	1st	415.222
2021	1st	414.521
2022	1st	423.628
2023	1st	422.458
2024	1st	425.324
2025	2nd	332.061
2026	1st	329.825

== Roster ==
2026–2027 Roster
Name	Height	Year	Hometown
Nartey Brady	6'0	FR	Los Ranchos, New Mexico
Carter Daniel	5'10	FR	League City, Texas
Zach Green	5'7	SR	San Jose, California
Kiefer Hong	5'7	FR	Tomball, Texas
Xander Hong	5'6	JR	Tomball, Texas
Jun Iwai	5'4	SO	Lewisville, Texas
Maksim Kan	5'9	FR	Muskego, Wisconsin
Cooper Kim	5'7	JR	Grand Ledge, Michigan
Reece Landsperger	5'7	SR	Chandler, Arizona
Kiran Mandava	5'9	JR	Cypress, Texas
Toma Murakawa	5'4	SR	Van Nuys, California
Wade Nelson	5'8	JR	Santa Ana, California
Joey Nieves	5'6	SO	Littleton, Colorado
Justin Park	5'4	FR	San Diego, California
Marcus Pietarinen	5'10	JR	Vantaa, Finland
Divier Ramos-Delgado	5'7	SO	Methuen, Massachusetts
Deano Roberts	5'6	SO	Portola Valley, California
Michael Scheiner		SO	Great Falls, Virginia
David Shamah	5'6	SR	McKinney, Texas
Kai Uemura	5'3	JR	Chicago, Illinois

== Coaching staff ==
Name	Position	Seasons
Thom Glielmi	Head coach	2003–present
Rubén López Martínez	Associate head coach	2024–present
Mitchell Soukup	Assistant coach	2025–present
Taylor Burkhart	Assistant coach	2027–present

== NCAA champions ==
Event	Winner/Year
Team (11)	1992, 1993, 1995, 2009, 2011, 2019, 2021, 2022, 2023, 2024, 2026
All-Around (9)	Steve Hug (1972, 1973, 1974); Jon Louis (1986); Akash Modi (2015, 2017); Brody Malone (2019, 2021); Khoi Young (2024)
Floor Exercise (8)	Mark Booth (1994); Ian Bachrach (1996); Eddie Penev (2012); Brody Malone (2019); Bryan Perla (2022); Nick Kuebler (2023); Asher Hong (2025); Cooper Kim (2026)
Pommel Horse (4)	Ted Marcy (1974, 1975, 1976); Brody Malone (2022)
Rings (6)	Marshall Erwin (2002); Alex Schorsch (2007); Dennis Zaremski (2016); Riley Loos (2022); Asher Hong (2024, 2025)
Vault (10)	Ian Bachrach (1995); Dan Gill (2002); David Sender (2006, 2007); Eddie Penev (2010, 2012); Sean Senters (2015); Asher Hong (2023, 2024); Jun Iwai (2026)
Parallel Bars (10)	Steve Hug (1973, 1974); Jair Lynch (1993); Jamie Ellis (1996); Ryan Lieberman (2010); Brian Knott (2015); Akash Modi (2016, 2017); Curran Phillips (2022); Asher Hong (2024)
Horizontal Bar (9)	Jair Lynch (1992); Dylan Carney (2006); Alex Buscaglia (2011); Akash Modi (2016); Robert Neff (2017, 2018); Brody Malone (2019, 2021, 2022)

== Athlete awards ==
=== Nissen-Emery Award winners ===
- Steve Hug (1974)
- Josh Stein (1995)
- Dan Gill (2004)
- Eddie Penev (2013)
- Akash Modi (2017)
- Brody Malone (2022)
- Colt Walker (2024)

=== CGA Gymnast of the Year ===
- Taylor Burkhart (2025)

=== CGA Rookie of the Year ===
- Brody Malone (2019)
- Brandon Briones (2020)
- Asher Hong (2023)

=== CGA Specialist of the Year ===
- Curran Phillips (2022)

=== MPSF Gymnast of the Year ===
- Dan Gill (2004)
- Sho Nakamori (2009)
- Tim Gentry (2011)
- Akash Modi (2014, 2015, 2016, 2017)
- Brody Malone (2019, 2020, 2021, 2022)
- Asher Hong (2023, 2024)
- Taylor Burkhart (2025)

== Stanford gymnasts at the Olympics ==
=== Olympians ===
Year	Country	Name	Medal
1972	United States	Steve Hug	
1976	United States	Steve Hug	
1992	United States	Jair Lynch	
1996	United States	Jair Lynch	parallel bars
2016	Czech Republic	David Jessen	
2020	Czech Republic	David Jessen	
2020	United States	Brody Malone	
2024	United States	Asher Hong	team
2024	United States	Brody Malone	team

=== Alternates ===
Year	Country	Name
1996	United States	Josh Stein
2008	United States	David Durante
2016	United States	Akash Modi
2020	United States	Brandon Briones
2020	United States	Akash Modi
2024	United States	Khoi Young
