= 2019 NCAA men's gymnastics championship =

American college gymnastics competition

2019 NCAA Men's Gymnastics Championships
- Venue: State Farm Center
- Location: Champaign, Illinois
- Dates: April 19–20, 2019
- Competitors: Oklahoma; Michigan; Stanford; Nebraska; Ohio State; Penn State; Iowa; Illinois; Navy; Minnesota; California; Army
- Winning score: 415.222

Champion
- Stanford

The 2019 NCAA Men's Gymnastics Championships were held from April 19–20, 2019 at the State Farm Center in Champaign, Illinois.

== National qualifier sessions ==
=== Session 1 ===
The first national qualifier session of the 2021 NCAA Men's Gymnastics Championships took place on April 19, 2019. The following teams competed in Session 1.

- Michigan
- Stanford
- Nebraska
- Minnesota
- Navy
- California

| School | Floor | Pommel horse | Rings | Vault | Parallel bars | High bars | Total |
|---|---|---|---|---|---|---|---|
| Michigan | 71.432 | 64.531 | 69.497 | 71.766 | 65.032 | 66.131 | 408.389 |
| Stanford | 70.398 | 64.365 | 69.465 | 71.431 | 65.631 | 66.298 | 407.588 |
| Nebraska | 69.732 | 63.565 | 67.265 | 72.365 | 65.265 | 67.531 | 405.723 |
| Minnesota | 69.665 | 62.032 | 66.799 | 68.799 | 66.031 | 62.733 | 396.059 |
| Navy | 68.065 | 61.264 | 66.299 | 68.331 | 63.965 | 65.199 | 393.123 |
| California | 66.831 | 61.333 | 64.798 | 70.265 | 64.033 | 63.599 | 390.859 |

=== Session 2 ===
The second national qualifier session of the 2019 NCAA Men's Gymnastics Championships took place on April 19, 2019. The following teams competed in Session 2.

- Oklahoma
- Ohio State
- Illinois
- Army
- Penn State
- Iowa

| School | Floor | Pommel horse | Rings | Vault | Parallel bars | High bars | Total |
|---|---|---|---|---|---|---|---|
| Oklahoma | 70.399 | 67.699 | 70.898 | 72.031 | 70.033 | 68.131 | 419.191 |
| Illinois | 68.131 | 68.265 | 69.732 | 71.365 | 64.698 | 68.133 | 410.324 |
| Penn State | 68.998 | 64.932 | 70.097 | 69.332 | 66.264 | 64.664 | 404.287 |
| Iowa | 67.865 | 61.799 | 68.599 | 70.398 | 65.864 | 65.865 | 400.390 |
| Ohio State | 68.598 | 63.331 | 67.464 | 70.864 | 64.132 | 65.365 | 399.754 |
| Army | 68.065 | 57.764 | 67.065 | 68.631 | 60.298 | 62.032 | 383.855 |

== NCAA Championship ==
The top three teams from each session advanced to the National Championship.

=== Standings ===
- National Champion: Stanford – 415.222
- 2nd Place: Oklahoma – 414.556
- 3rd Place: Nebraska – 407.489

| School | Floor | Pommel horse | Rings | Vault | Parallel bars | High bars | Total |
|---|---|---|---|---|---|---|---|
| Stanford | 71.898 | 64.564 | 71.131 | 72.632 | 67.365 | 67.632 | 415.222 |
| Oklahoma | 69.698 | 67.265 | 70.565 | 72.932 | 68.031 | 66.065 | 414.556 |
| Nebraska | 70.065 | 66.731 | 68.031 | 72.065 | 65.398 | 65.199 | 407.489 |
| Michigan | 71.432 | 63.831 | 69.498 | 73.264 | 65.498 | 62.831 | 406.354 |
| Illinois | 71.199 | 66.166 | 69.432 | 70.898 | 63.564 | 64.099 | 405.358 |
| Penn State | 68.032 | 66.932 | 69.332 | 68.032 | 63.699 | 63.698 | 399.725 |

== Individual event finals ==
The top-three all-around competitors and top-three individuals on each event who are not members of one of the qualifying teams advanced from each pre-qualifying session to the finals session to compete for individual titles. Finals competition took place on April 20.

=== Medalists ===
| Event | Gold | Silver | Bronze |
|---|---|---|---|
| Individual all-around | Brody Malone (Stanford) | Shane Wiskus (Minnesota) | Genki Suzuki (Oklahoma) |
| Floor | Brody Malone (Stanford) | Bailey Perez (Stanford) | Jacob Moore (Michigan) |
| Pommel horse | Alec Yoder (Ohio State) | Stephen Nedoroscik (Penn State) | Yul Moldauer (Oklahoma) |
| Rings | Alex Diab (Illinois) | Yul Moldauer (Oklahoma) | Noah Roberson (Penn State) |
| Vault | Anthony McCallum (Michigan) | Bryan Perla (Stanford) | Anton Stephenson (Nebraska) |
| Parallel bars | Shane Wiskus (Minnesota) | Genki Suzuki (Oklahoma) | Blake Sun (Stanford) |
| High bar | Brody Malone (Stanford) | Grant Breckenridge (Stanford) | Lukas Texeira (Air Force) |
