= Oklahoma Sooners men's gymnastics =

College men's gymnastics

- University: University of Oklahoma
- Athletic director: Roger Denny
- Head coach: Mark Williams
- Conference: MPSF
- Location: Norman, Oklahoma
- Home arena: McCasland Field House (Capacity: 5,000)
- Nickname: Sooners
- Colors: Crimson and cream

National championships
- 12 (1977, 1978, 1991, 2002, 2003, 2005, 2006, 2008, 2015, 2016, 2017, 2018); NCAA Championships

The Oklahoma Sooners men's gymnastics team represents the University of Oklahoma and competes in the Mountain Pacific Sports Federation. The team has won 12 NCAA National Championships, most recently in 2018.

== Roster ==
2025–26 Roster
Name	Height	Class	Hometown
Colby Aranda	5'10	R-FR	Grapevine, TX
Arthur Ballon	5'10	R-SO	Lyon, France
Fuzzy Benas	5'6	R-SR	Richmond, TX
Max Bereznev	5'7	R-SO	Woodstock, GA
Sasha Bogonosiuk	5'7	FR	Buffalo Grove, IL
Kelton Christiansen	5'7	SR	Arvada, CO
Colin Flores	5'6	JR	Mountain House, CA
Tyler Flores	5'6	JR	Mountain House, CA
Brigham Frentheway	5'5	5th	Cheyenne, WY
Tas Hajdu	5'9	JR	Las Vegas, NV
Nico Hamilton	5'6	JR	Grapevine, TX
Leo Koike	5'5	R-JR	Saitama Prefecture
Max Morelos	5'7	FR	Bakersfield, CA
Alex Noel	5'6	FR	Nashua, NH
Jackson Rendon	5'7	FR	Knoxville, TN
Nathan Roman	5'6	FR	Poway, CA
Mac Seyler	5'7	R-JR	Flower Mound, TX
Francisco Velez Belendez	5'2	SO	San Juan, PR
Ignacio Yockers	5'8	SR	Tulsa, OK
Brandon Zepeda-Orth	5'7	R-SO	Wheat Ridge, CO

== Coaching staff ==
Name	Position	Seasons
Mark Williams	Head coach	2000–present
Valeriy Goncharov	Asst. coach	2019–present
Josh Yee	Asst. coach	2018–present
Genki Suzuki	Asst. coach	2023–present

== NCAA champions ==
Event	Winner/Year
Team (12)	1977, 1978, 1991, 2002, 2003, 2005, 2006, 2008, 2015, 2016, 2017, 2018
All-Around (8)	Bart Conner (1978); Daniel Furney (2003); Jonathan Horton (2006); Taqiy Abdullah-Simmons (2007); Steven Legendre (2009); Jake Dalton (2012); Yul Moldauer (2016, 2018)
Floor Exercise (17)	Odessa Lovin (1972, 1973); Bart Conner (1979); Mike Wilson (1979); Jeremy Killen (1997); Josh Landis (2003); Jonathan Horton (2006, 2007); Steven Legendre (2008, 2009, 2010); Jake Dalton (2011); Alec Robin (2014); Colin Van Wicklen (2016); Yul Moldauer (2017, 2018); Gage Dyer (2021)
Pommel Horse (4)	Josh Landis (2003); Alexander Naddour (2010, 2011); Michael Reid (2015)
Rings (8)	Dan Fink (1998); David Henderson (2005); Jonathan Horton (2006, 2008); Michael Squires (2013, 2014, 2015); Yul Moldauer (2017)
Vault (9)	Greg Goodhue (1974); Leslie Moore (1979); Mark Oates (1983); Steven Legendre (2008, 2009); Jake Dalton (2011); Alec Robin (2014); Yul Moldauer (2018); Gage Dyer (2021); Tyler Flores (2026)
Parallel Bars (4)	Daniel Furney (2003); Jake Dalton (2012); Yul Moldauer (2018); Nathan Roman (2026)
Horizontal Bar (5)	Todd Bishop (1998, 1999); Jonathan Horton (2007); Emre Dodanlı (2025); Kelton Christiansen (2026)

== Athlete awards ==
=== Nissen-Emery Award winners ===
- Bart Conner (1981)
- Jarrod Hanks (1991)
- Daniel Fink (1998)
- Todd Bishop (1999)
- Daniel Furney (2003)
- Jonathan Horton (2008)
- Steven Legendre (2011)
- Yul Moldauer (2019)

=== CGA Gymnast of the Year ===
- Fuzzy Benas (2024)

=== CGA Rookie of the Year ===
- Fuzzy Benas (2022)
- Sasha Bogonosiuk (2026)

=== CGA Specialist of the Year ===
- Gage Dyer (2021)
- Ignacio Yockers (2023)
- Emre Dodanlı (2024)

=== MPSF Gymnast of the Year ===
- Jonathan Horton (2008)
- Jake Dalton (2012)
- Presten Ellsworth (2013)
- Yul Moldauer (2018)

=== MPSF Rookie of the Year ===
- Francisco Velez Belendez (2025)

== Oklahoma gymnasts at the Olympics ==
=== Olympians ===
Year	Country	Name	Medal(s)
1976	United States	Bart Conner	
1984	United States	Bart Conner	team parallel bars
2004	United States	Guard Young	team
2008	United States	Jonathan Horton	horizontal bar team
2012	United States	Jake Dalton	
2012	United States	Jonathan Horton	
2016	United States	Chris Brooks	
2016	United States	Jake Dalton	
2016	United States	Alexander Naddour	pommel horse
2020	United States	Yul Moldauer	
2024	Turkey	Emre Dodanlı	

=== Alternates ===
Year	Country	Name
2012	United States	Chris Brooks
2020	United States	Allan Bower

== See also ==
- Oklahoma Sooners women's gymnastics
