= 2021 NCAA men's gymnastics championship =

American college gymnastics tournament

2021 NCAA Men's Gymnastics Championships
- Venue: Maturi Pavilion
- Location: Minneapolis, Minnesota
- Dates: April 16–17, 2021
- Competitors: Oklahoma; Michigan; Stanford; Nebraska; Ohio State; Penn State; Iowa; Illinois; Navy; Minnesota; California; William & Mary
- Winning score: 414.521

Champion
- Stanford

The 2021 NCAA Men's Gymnastics Championships were held from April 16-17, 2021 at the Maturi Pavilion in Minneapolis, Minnesota. Both of the qualifying sessions were broadcast live on Big Ten Network+, while the championship finals were televised live on Big Ten Network.

== National qualifier sessions ==
=== Session 1 ===
The first national qualifier session of the 2021 NCAA Men's Gymnastics Championships took place on April 16, 2021 at 2 PM. The following teams competed in Session 1.

- No. 1 Oklahoma
- No, 4 Nebraska
- No. 5 Ohio State
- No. 8 Illinois
- No. 9 Navy
- No. 12 William & Mary

School	Floor	Pommel horse	Rings	Vault	Parallel bars	High bars	Total
Nebraska	70.599	67.631	66.798	71.530	65.133	66.932	408.623
Oklahoma	68.665	63.631	68.932	71.999	66.265	66.698	406.190
Illinois	69.498	63.631	67.332	70.997	65.298	63.965	400.721
Ohio State	69.497	62.266	64.765	70.898	63.832	63.698	394.956
Navy	68.298	63.099	64.565	70.165	60.765	64.098	390.990
William & Mary	66.132	50.765	64.565	66.565	60.698	62.531	371.256

=== Session 2 ===
The second national qualifier session of the 2021 NCAA Men's Gymnastics Championships took place on April 16, 2021 at 8 PM. The following teams competed in Session 2.

- No. 2 Michigan
- No. 3 Stanford
- No. 6 Penn State
- No. 7 Iowa
- No. 10 Minnesota
- No. 11 California

School	Floor	Pommel horse	Rings	Vault	Parallel bars	High bars	Total
Stanford	70.797	64.398	69.965	73.065	68.165	67.465	413.855
Michigan	69.265	67.665	69.264	70.065	68.598	66.598	411.455
Minnesota	68.832	64.098	65.999	71.698	66.532	67.464	404.623
Penn State	70.100	67.065	64.331	69.298	65.964	65.598	402.356
Iowa	69.997	62.898	67.865	70.198	65.731	64.431	401.120
California	69.065	62.132	63.264	69.965	64.098	63.531	392.055

== NCAA Championship ==
The top three teams from each session advanced to the National Championship, which were televised live on the Big Ten Network on April 17 at 8 PM.

=== Standings ===
- National Champion: Stanford – 414.521
- 2nd Place: Oklahoma – 411.591
- 3rd Place: Michigan – 410.358

School	Floor	Pommel horse	Rings	Vault	Parallel bars	High bars	Total
Stanford	70.598	65.331	70.097	73.432	67.132	67.931	414.521
Oklahoma	72.965	63.164	69.266	72.665	66.699	66.832	411.591
Michigan	71.599	65.566	69.298	70.132	68.498	65.265	410.358
Nebraska	70.465	65.965	65.298	72.098	67.266	65.532	406.624
Minnesota	70.599	63.798	67.632	70.698	66.832	66.732	406.291
Illinois	70.532	62.632	65.031	70.365	65.632	63.799	397.991

== Individual event finals ==
The top-three all-around competitors and top-three individuals on each event who are not members of one of the qualifying teams advanced from each pre-qualifying session to the finals session to compete for individual titles. Finals competition took place on April 17.

=== Medalists ===
Event	Gold	Silver	Bronze
Individual all-around	Brody Malone (Stanford)	Shane Wiskus (Minnesota)	Brandon Briones (Stanford)
Floor	Gage Dyer (Oklahoma)	Shane Wiskus (Minnesota)	Jacob Moore (Michigan)
Pommel horse	Ian Skirkey (Illinois)	Paul Juda (Michigan)	Evan Kriley (Nebraska)
Rings	Shane Wiskus (Minnesota)	Brody Malone (Stanford)	Riley Loos (Stanford)
Vault	Gage Dyer (Oklahoma)	Zach Martin (Stanford)	Curran Phillips (Stanford)
Parallel bars	Shane Wiskus (Minnesota)	Evgeny Siminiuc (Michigan)	Virgil Watkins (Michigan)
High bar	Brody Malone (Stanford)	Shane Wiskus (Minnesota)	Adam Wooten (Michigan)
