= NCAA men's gymnastics championships =

Gymnastics tournament

- Association: NCAA
- Sport: College gymnastics
- Founded: 1938; 88 years ago
- Division: Division I, Division II, and Division III
- No. of teams: 15
- Country: United States
- Most recent champion: Stanford (11th title)
- Most titles: Penn State (12); Oklahoma (12)
- Website: NCAA.com

The NCAA men's gymnastics championships are contested at an annual competition sponsored by the National Collegiate Athletic Association to determine the team and individual national champions of men's collegiate gymnastics among its member programs in the United States.

Unlike most other NCAA-sponsored sports, the men's gymnastics championship is not separated into divisions and uses a single National Collegiate tournament instead. Currently, only 15 schools sponsor NCAA men's gymnastics teams, with three of them outside of Division I: Greenville University, Simpson College, Springfield College (Division III).

== Programs ==
The 15 teams compete in three conferences.

Conference	School
Big Ten	University of Illinois
Big Ten	University of Michigan
Big Ten	University of Nebraska
Big Ten	Ohio State University
Big Ten	Penn State University
ECAC	Greenville University
ECAC	Simpson College
ECAC	Springfield College
ECAC	U.S. Military Academy
ECAC	U.S. Naval Academy
ECAC	College of William and Mary
MPSF	University of California - Berkeley
MPSF	University of Oklahoma
MPSF	Stanford University
MPSF	U.S. Air Force Academy

== Events ==
=== Individual events ===
- All-around
- Floor exercise
- Pommel horse (side horse)
- Rings (still)
- Vault (long horse)
- Parallel bars
- Horizontal bar

=== Discontinued events ===
- Trampoline (rebound tumbling)
- Tumbling
- Rope climb
- Flying rings

== Results ==
NCAA Men's Gymnastics Championships
Year	Site (Host Team)	Arena	Championship Results				All-Around Champion	Score
Year	Site (Host Team)	Arena	Champion	Points	Runner-up	Points	All-Around Champion	Score
1938; Details	Chicago	Bartlett Gymnasium	Chicago	22	Illinois	18	Joe Giallombardo (Illinois)	2509
1939; Details	Chicago	Bartlett Gymnasium	Illinois	21	Army	17	Joe Giallombardo (Illinois)	2471 (Note: As taken from a newspaper report. The official NCAA record books do not list a score.)
1940; Details	Chicago	Bartlett Gymnasium	Illinois (2)	20	Navy; Temple (Note: As reflected in the NCAA Record Book. An Associated Press article reported Temple finished 4th place with 16 points.)	17	Joe Giallombardo (Illinois); Paul Fina (Illinois)	2331
1941; Details	Chicago	Bartlett Gymnasium	Illinois (3)	68.5 (Note: As reflected in the NCAA Record Book. A news article reported this score as 68.)	Minnesota	52.5 (Note: As reflected in the NCAA Record Book. A news article reported this score as 52.)	Courtney Shanken (Chicago)	2832.50
1942; Details	Annapolis, Maryland	Macdonough Hall	Illinois (4)	39	Penn State	30	Newt Loken (Minnesota)	1233.80
1943	Not held due to World War II							
1944	Not held due to World War II							
1945	Not held due to World War II							
1946	Not held due to World War II							
1947	Not held due to World War II							
1948; Details	Chicago	Bartlett Gymnasium	Penn State	55	Temple	34.5	Ray Sorensen (Penn State)	1537 (Note: As taken from a newspaper report. The official NCAA record books do not list a score.)
1949; Details	Berkeley, California	Gymnasium for Men	Temple	28	Minnesota	18	Joe Kotys (Kent State)	1035 (Note: As taken from a newspaper report. The official NCAA record books do not list a score.)
1950; Details	West Point, New York	Gillis Field House	Illinois (5)	26	Temple	25	Joe Kotys (Kent State)	– (Note: Score unknown.)
1951; Details	Ann Arbor, Michigan	Yost Field House	Florida State	26	Illinois; USC	23.5	Bill Roetzheim (Florida State)	1605
1952; Details	Boulder, Colorado	Balch Fieldhouse	Florida State (2)	89.5	USC	75	Jack Beckner (USC)	1486
1953; Details	Syracuse, New York	Archbold Gymnasium	Penn State (2)	91.5	Illinois	68	Jean Cronstedt (Penn State)	1275
1954; Details	Champaign, Illinois	Huff Hall	Penn State (3)	137	Illinois	68	Jean Cronstedt (Penn State)	1557
1955; Details	Los Angeles	Men's Gym	Illinois (6)	82	Penn State	69	Karl Schwenzfeier (Penn State)	1620
1956; Details	Chapel Hill, North Carolina	Woollen Gymnasium	Illinois (7)	123.5	Penn State	67.5	Don Tonry (Illinois)	1493
1957; Details	Annapolis, Maryland	Macdonough Hall	Penn State (4)	88.5	Illinois	80	Armando Vega (Penn State)	1601
1958; Details	East Lansing, Michigan	Jenison Fieldhouse	Illinois (8); Michigan State	79	Penn State	72.5	Abie Grossfeld (Illinois)	511
1959; Details	Berkeley, California	Haas Pavilion	Penn State (5)	152	Illinois	87.5	Armando Vega (Penn State)	551.25
1960; Details	State College, Pennsylvania	Recreation Building	Penn State (6)	112.5	USC	66.5	Jay Werner (Penn State)	547.25
1961; Details	Champaign, Illinois	Huff Hall	Penn State (7)	88.5	Southern Illinois	80.5	Gregor Weiss (Penn State)	54.525
1962; Details	Albuquerque, New Mexico	Johnson Gymnasium	USC	95.5	Southern Illinois	75	Robert Lynn (USC)	54.775
1963; Details	Pittsburgh	Fitzgerald Field House	Michigan	129	Southern Illinois	73	Gil Larose (Michigan)	55.90
1964; Details	Los Angeles	–	Southern Illinois	84.5	USC	69.5	Ron Barak (USC)	54.85
1965; Details	Carbondale, Illinois	SIU Arena	Penn State (8)	68.5	Washington	51.5	Mike Jacobson (Penn State)	54.75
1966; Details	State College, Pennsylvania	Recreation Building	Southern Illinois (2)	187.200	California	185.100	Steve Cohen (Penn State)	55.75
1967; Details	Carbondale, Illinois	SIU Arena	Southern Illinois (3)	189.550	Michigan	187.400	Steve Cohen (Penn State)	55.75
1968; Details	Tucson, Arizona	Men's Gymnasium	California	188.250	Southern Illinois	188.150	Makoto Sakamoto (USC)	110.45
1969; Details	Seattle	Hec Edmundson Pavilion	Iowa	161.175	Penn State	160.450	Mauno Nissinen (Washington)	108.200
1970; Details	Philadelphia	McGonigle Hall	Michigan (2)	164.150	Iowa State	164.050	Yoshi Hayasaki (Washington)	108.25
1971; Details	Ann Arbor, Michigan	Yost Field House	Iowa State	319.075	Southern Illinois	316.650	Yoshi Hayasaki (Washington)	107.9
1972; Details	Ames, Iowa	Hilton Coliseum	Southern Illinois (4)	315.925	Iowa State	312.325	Steve Hug (Stanford)	107.75
1973; Details	Eugene, Oregon	McArthur Court	Iowa State (2)	325.150	Penn State	323.025	Steve Hug (Stanford); Marshall Avener (Penn State)	110.05
1974; Details	State College, Pennsylvania	Recreation Building	Iowa State (3)	328.675	Arizona State	324.900	Steve Hug (Stanford)	108.95
1975; Details	Terre Haute, Indiana	Hulman Center	California (2)	437.325	LSU	433.700	Wayne Young (BYU)	109.65
1976; Details	Philadelphia	McGonigle Hall	Penn State (9)	432.075	LSU	425.125	Peter Kormann (So. Conn. St.)	108.95
1977; Details	Tempe, Arizona	ASU Activity Center	Indiana State; Oklahoma	434.475	So. Connecticut St.	425.125	Kurt Thomas (Indiana State)	111.15
1978; Details	Eugene, Oregon	McArthur Court	Oklahoma (2)	439.350	Arizona State	437.075	Bart Conner (Oklahoma)	112.65
1979; Details	Baton Rouge, Louisiana	Pete Maravich Assembly Center	Nebraska	448.275	Oklahoma	446.625	Kurt Thomas (Indiana State)	111.15
1980; Details	Lincoln, Nebraska	Bob Devaney Sports Center	Nebraska (2)	563.300	Iowa State	557.650	Jim Hartung (Nebraska)	115.02
1981; Details	Lincoln, Nebraska	Bob Devaney Sports Center	Nebraska (3)	284.600	Oklahoma	281.950	Jim Hartung (Nebraska)	115.90
1982; Details	Lincoln, Nebraska	Bob Devaney Sports Center	Nebraska (4)	285.500	UCLA	281.050	Peter Vidmar (UCLA)	116.30
1983; Details	State College, Pennsylvania	Recreation Building	Nebraska (5)	287.800	UCLA	283.900	Peter Vidmar (UCLA)	116.95
1984; Details	Los Angeles	Pauley Pavilion	UCLA	287.300	Penn State	281.250	Mitch Gaylord (UCLA)	116.95
1985; Details	Lincoln, Nebraska	Bob Devaney Sports Center	Ohio State	285.350	Nebraska	284.550	Wes Suter (Nebraska)	58.27
1986; Details	Lincoln, Nebraska	Bob Devaney Sports Center	Arizona State	283.900	Nebraska	283.600	Jon Louis (Stanford)	57.60
1987; Details	Los Angeles	Pauley Pavilion	UCLA (2)	285.300	Nebraska	284.750	Tom Schlesinger (Nebraska)	113.25
1988; Details	Lincoln, Nebraska	Bob Devaney Sports Center	Nebraska (6)	288.150	Illinois	287.150	Miguel Rubio (Houston Baptist)	114.150
1989; Details	Lincoln, Nebraska	Bob Devaney Sports Center	Illinois (9)	283.400	Nebraska	282.300	Patrick Kirksey (Nebraska)	112.600
1990; Details	Minneapolis, Minnesota	Sports Pavilion	Nebraska (7)	287.400	Minnesota	287.300	Mike Racanelli (Ohio State)	114.750
1991; Details	State College, Pennsylvania	Recreation Building	Oklahoma (3)	288.025	Penn State	285.500	John Roethlisberger (Minnesota)	115.450
1992; Details	Lincoln, Nebraska	Bob Devaney Sports Center	Stanford	289.575	Nebraska	288.950	John Roethlisberger (Minnesota)	116.075
1993; Details	Albuquerque, New Mexico	The Pit	Stanford (2)	276.500	Nebraska	275.500	John Roethlisberger (Minnesota)	58.075
1994; Details	Lincoln, Nebraska	Bob Devaney Sports Center	Nebraska (8)	288.250	Stanford	285.925	Dennis Harrison (Nebraska)	58.200
1995; Details	Columbus, Ohio	St. John Arena	Stanford (3)	232.400	Nebraska	231.525	Richard Grace (Nebraska)	58.325
1996; Details	Stanford, California	Maples Pavilion	Ohio State (2)	232.150	California	231.775	Blaine Wilson (Ohio State)	58.625
1997; Details	Iowa City, Iowa	Carver–Hawkeye Arena	California (3)	233.825	Oklahoma	232.725	Blaine Wilson (Ohio State)	58.625
1998; Details	State College, Pennsylvania	Rec Hall	California (4)	231.200	Iowa	229.675	Travis Romagnoli (Illinois)	58.225
1999; Details	Lincoln, Nebraska	Bob Devaney Sports Center	Michigan (3)	232.500	Ohio State	230.850	Jason Hardabura (Nebraska)	58.050
2000; Details	Iowa City, Iowa	Carver–Hawkeye Arena	Penn State (10)	231.975	Michigan	231.850	Jamie Natalie (Ohio State)	58.375
2001; Details	Columbus, Ohio	St. John Arena	Ohio State (3)	218.125	Oklahoma	217.775	Jamie Natalie (Ohio State)	55.700
2002; Details	Norman, Oklahoma	Lloyd Noble Center	Oklahoma (4)	219.300	Ohio State	218.650	Raj Bhavsar (Ohio State)	55.875
2003; Details	Philadelphia	Liacouras Center	Oklahoma (5)	222.600	Ohio State	220.700	Daniel Furney (Oklahoma)	56.100
2004; Details	Champaign, Illinois	Assembly Hall	Penn State (11)	223.350	Oklahoma	222.300	Luis Vargas (Penn State)	56.475
2005; Details	West Point, New York	Christl Arena	Oklahoma (6)	225.675	Ohio State	225.450	Luis Vargas (Penn State)	57.175
2006; Details	Norman, Oklahoma	Lloyd Noble Center	Oklahoma (7)	221.400	Illinois	220.975	Jonathan Horton (Oklahoma)	56.000
2007; Details	State College, Pennsylvania	Rec Hall	Penn State (12)	221.000	Oklahoma	220.200	Taqiy Abdullah-Simmons (Oklahoma)	55.750
2008; Details	Stanford, California	Maples Pavilion	Oklahoma (8)	363.200	Stanford	362.750	Casey Sandy (Penn State)	91.350
2009; Details	Minneapolis	Sports Pavilion	Stanford (4)	362.800	Michigan	361.500	Steven Legendre (Oklahoma)	90.500
2010; Details	West Point, New York	Christl Arena	Michigan (4)	360.500	Stanford	359.800	Chris Cameron (Michigan)	90.500
2011; Details	Columbus, Ohio	St. John Arena	Stanford (5)	363.450	Oklahoma	361.600	Sam Mikulak (Michigan)	90.750
2012; Details	Norman, Oklahoma	Lloyd Noble Center	Illinois (10)	358.850	Oklahoma	357.450	Jacob Dalton (Oklahoma)	91.000
2013; Details	State College, Pennsylvania	Rec Hall	Michigan (5)	443.200	Oklahoma	440.100	Sam Mikulak (Michigan)	91.150
2014; Details	Ann Arbor, Michigan	Crisler Center	Michigan (6)	445.050	Oklahoma	441.650	Sam Mikulak (Michigan)	91.100
2015; Details	Norman, Oklahoma	Lloyd Noble Center	Oklahoma (9)	447.050	Stanford	440.450	Akash Modi (Stanford)	90.450
2016; Details	Columbus, Ohio	St. John Arena	Oklahoma (10)	443.400	Stanford	434.050	Yul Moldauer (Oklahoma)	89.100
2017; Details	West Point, New York	Christl Arena	Oklahoma (11)	431.950	Ohio State	423.700	Akash Modi (Stanford)	87.900
2018; Details	Chicago, Illinois	UIC Pavilion	Oklahoma (12)	414.858	Minnesota	411.923	Yul Moldauer (Oklahoma)	87.298
2019; Details	Champaign, Illinois	State Farm Center	Stanford (6)	415.222	Oklahoma	414.556	Brody Malone (Stanford)	85.832
2020	Ann Arbor, Michigan	Crisler Center	Not held due to COVID-19 pandemic					
2021; Details	Minneapolis, Minnesota	Maturi Pavilion	Stanford (7)	414.521	Oklahoma	411.591	Brody Malone (Stanford)	85.064
2022; Details	Norman, Oklahoma	Lloyd Noble Center	Stanford (8)	423.628	Oklahoma	414.555	Paul Juda (Michigan)	85.298
2023; Details	State College, Pennsylvania	Rec Hall	Stanford (9)	422.458	Michigan	419.889	Fred Richard (Michigan)	85.998
2024; Details	Columbus, Ohio	Covelli Center	Stanford (10)	425.324	Michigan	419.689	Khoi Young (Stanford)	86.098
2025; Details	Ann Arbor, Michigan	Crisler Center	Michigan (7)	332.224	Stanford	332,061	Fred Richard (Michigan)	84.264
2026; Details	Champaign, Illinois	State Farm Center	Stanford (11)	329.825	Oklahoma	328.495	Fred Richard (Michigan)	83.598
2027	Norman, Oklahoma	Lloyd Noble Center						
2028	State College, Pennsylvania	Rec Hall						

== Individual champions ==
=== Current events ===
Year	Floor exercise	Pommel horse	Rings	Vault	Parallel bars	Horizontal bar
1938; Details	—N/a	Erwin Beyer (Chicago)	—N/a	Erwin Beyer (Chicago)	Erwin Beyer (Chicago)	Bob Sears (Note: As reflected in the NCAA Record Book. Army has also referenced him as Robert Sears.) (Army)
1939; Details	—N/a	Erwin Beyer (Chicago)	—N/a	Marv Forman (Illinois)	Bob Sears (Note: As reflected in the NCAA Record Book. Army has also referenced him as Robert Sears.) (Army)	Adam Walters (Temple)
1940; Details	—N/a	Harry Koehnemann (Illinois)	—N/a	Earl Shanken (Chicago)	Bob Hanning (Minnesota)	Norm Boardman (Temple)
1941; Details	Ed Danser (Temple) (Note: As reflected in the NCAA Record Book. Newspaper reports do not mention this event.)	Caton Cobb (Illinois)	—N/a	Earl Shanken (Chicago)	Caton Cobb (Illinois)	Newt Loken (Minnesota)
1942; Details	—N/a	Caton Cobb (Illinois)	—N/a	Earl Shanken (Chicago)	Hal Zimmerman (Note: As reflected in the NCAA Record Book. Penn State has also referenced him as Harold Zimmerman.) (Penn State)	Norm Boardman (Temple)
1943	Not held due to World War II					
1944	Not held due to World War II					
1945	Not held due to World War II					
1946	Not held due to World War II					
1947	Not held due to World War II					
1948; Details	—N/a (Note: According to the NCAA record books, Free Exercise (now known as the Floor Exercise) did not award a championship in 1948. However, newspaper reports show the event taking place.)	Steve Greene (Note: As reflected in the NCAA Record Book. Penn State has also referenced him as Stephen Greene.) (Penn State)	—N/a	Jim Peterson (Minnesota)	Ray Sorensen (Penn State)	Joe Calvetti (Illinois)
1949; Details	—N/a	Joe Berenato (Temple)	—N/a	—N/a	Joe Kotys (Kent State) Mel Stout (Michigan State)	Bob Stout (Temple)
1950; Details	—N/a	Gene Rabbitt (Note: As reflected in the NCAA Record Book. Syracuse has also referenced him as Eugene Rabbitt.) (Syracuse)	—N/a	—N/a	Joe Kotys (Kent State)	Joe Kotys (Kent State)
1951	—N/a	Joe Kotys (Kent St)	—N/a	—N/a	Jack Beckner (USC)	Bill Roetzheim (Florida St)
1952	—N/a	Frank Bare (Illinois)	—N/a	Dick Gutting (Florida St)	Jack Beckner (USC)	Charles Simms (USC)
1953	Bob Sullivan (Illinois)	Carlton Rintz (Michigan St)	—N/a	—N/a	Jean Cronstedt (Penn St)	Hal Lewis (Navy)
1954	Jean Cronstedt (Penn St)	Robert Lawrence (Penn St)	—N/a	—N/a	Jean Cronstedt (Penn St)	Jean Cronstedt (Penn St)
1955	Don Faber (UCLA)	Carlton Rintz (Michigan St)	—N/a	—N/a	Carlton Rintz (Michigan St)	Carlton Rintz (Michigan St)
1956	Jamile Ashmore (Florida St)	James Bown (Cal St LA)	—N/a	—N/a	Armando Vega (Penn St)	Ronnie Amster (Florida St)
1957	Norman Marks (Cal St LA)	John Davis (Illinois)	—N/a	—N/a	Armando Vega (Penn St)	Abie Grossfeld (Illinois)
1958	Abie Grossfeld (Illinois)	Bill Buck (Iowa)	—N/a	—N/a	Ted Muzyczko (Michigan St)	Abie Grossfeld (Illinois)
1959	Don Tonry (Illinois)	Art Shurlock (California)	Armando Vega (Penn St)	—N/a	Armando Vega (Penn St)	Stanley Tarshis (Michigan St)
1960	Ray Hadley (Illinois)	James Fairchild (California)	Sam Garcia (USC)	—N/a	Robert Lynn (USC)	Stanley Tarshis (Michigan St)
1961	Robert Lynn (USC)	James Fairchild (California)	Fred Orlofsky (S. Illinois)	Fred Orlofsky (S. Illinois)	Fred Tijerina (S. Illinois) Jeff Cardinalli (Springfield)	Bruno Klaus (S. Illinois)
1962	Robert Lynn (USC)	Mike Aufrecht (Illinois)	Dale Cooper (Michigan St)	Bruno Klaus (S. Illinois)	Robert Lynn (USC)	Robert Lynn (USC)
1963	Tom Seward (Penn St) Mike Henderson (Michigan)	Russ Mills (Yale)	Dale Cooper (Michigan St)	Gil Larose (Michigan)	Arno Lascari (Michigan)	Gil Larose (Michigan)
1964	Rusty Mitchell (S. Illinois)	Russ Mills (Yale)	Chris Evans (Arizona St)	Sidney Oglesby (Syracuse)	Ron Barak (USC)	Ron Barak (USC)
1965	Frank Schmitz (S. Illinois)	Bob Elsinger (Springfield)	Glenn Gailis (Iowa)	Dan Millman (California)	Jim Curzi (Michigan St)	Jim Curzi (Michigan St) Mike Jacobsen (Penn St)
1966	Frank Schmitz (S. Illinois)	Gary Hoskins (Cal St LA)	Ed Gunny (Michigan St)	Frank Schmitz (S. Illinois)	Jim Curzi (Michigan St)	Rusty Rock (CSUN)
1967	Dave Jacobs (Michigan)	Keith McCanless (Iowa)	Josh Robison (California)	Paul Mayer (S. Illinois)	Makoto Sakamoto (USC)	Rich Grigsby (CSUN)
1968	Toby Towson (Michigan St) Sid Freudenstein (California)	Jack Ryan (Colorado)	Pat Arnold (Arizona)	Bruce Colter (Cal St LA)	Makoto Sakamoto (USC)	Makoto Sakamoto (USC)
1969	Toby Towson (Michigan St)	Keith McCanless (Iowa)	Paul Vexler (Penn St) Ward Maythaler (Iowa St)	Dan Bowles (California) Jack McCarthy (Illinois)	Ron Rapper (Michigan)	Bob Manna (New Mexico)
1970	Tom Proulx (Colorado St)	Russ Hoffman (Iowa St) John Russo (Wisconsin)	Dave Seal (Indiana St)	Doug Boger (Arizona)	Ron Rapper (Michigan)	Yoshi Hayasaki (Washington)
1971	Stormy Eaton (New Mexico)	Russ Hoffman (Iowa St)	Charles Ropiequet (S. Illinois)	Pat Mahoney (CSUN)	Brent Simmons (Iowa St) Tom Dunn (Penn St)	Brent Simmons (Iowa St)
1972	Odess Lovin (Oklahoma)	Russ Hoffman (Iowa St)	Dave Seal (Indiana St)	Gary Morava (S. Illinois)	Dennis Mazur (Iowa St)	Tom Lindner (S. Illinois)
1973	Odess Lovin (Oklahoma)	Ed Slezak (Indiana St)	Bob Mahorney (Indiana St)	John Crosby (S. Conn St)	Steve Hug (Stanford)	Jon Aitken (New Mexico)
1974	Doug Fitzjarrell (Iowa St)	Ted Marcy (Stanford)	Keith Heaver (Iowa St)	Greg Goodhue (Oklahoma)	Steve Hug (Stanford)	Rick Danley (Indiana St)
1975	Kent Brown (Arizona St)	Ted Marcy (Stanford)	Keith Heaver (Iowa St)	Tom Beach (California)	Yoichi Tomita (Long Beach St)	Rich Larsen (Iowa St)
1976	Bob Robbins (Colorado St)	Ted Marcy (Stanford)	Doug Wood (Iowa St)	Sam Shaw (Cal St Fullerton)	Gene Whelan (Penn St)	Tom Beach (California)
1977	Ron Galimore (LSU)	Chuck Walter (New Mexico)	Doug Wood (Iowa St)	Steve Wejmar (Washington)	Kurt Thomas (Indiana St)	John Hart (UCLA)
1978	Curt Austin (Iowa St)	Mike Burke (N. Illinois)	Scott McEldowney (Oregon)	Ron Galimore (LSU)	John Corritore (Michigan)	Mel Cooley (Washington)
1979	Mike Wilson (Oklahoma) Bart Conner (Oklahoma)	Mike Burke (N. Illinois)	Kirk Mango (N. Illinois)	Leslie Moore (Oklahoma)	Kurt Thomas (Indiana St)	Kurt Thomas (Indiana St)
1980	Steve Elliott (Nebraska)	David Stoldt (Illinois)	Jim Hartung (Nebraska)	Ron Galimore (Iowa St)	Phil Cahoy (Nebraska)	Phil Cahoy (Nebraska) Darrell Kerbe (LSU)
1981	James Yuhashi (Oregon)	Mark Bergman (California) Steve Jennings (New Mexico)	Jim Hartung (Nebraska)	Randall Wickstrom (California)	Phil Cahoy (Nebraska) Peter Vidmar (UCLA) Jim Hartung (Nebraska)	Phil Cahoy (Nebraska)
1982	Steve Elliott (Nebraska)	Peter Vidmar (UCLA) Steve Jennings (New Mexico)	Jim Hartung (Nebraska)	Randall Wickstrom (California) Steve Elliott (Nebraska)	Jim Hartung (Nebraska)	Peter Vidmar (UCLA)
1983	Scott Johnson (Nebraska) David Branch (Arizona St) Donnie Hinton (Arizona St)	Doug Kieso (N. Illinois)	Alex Schwartz (UCLA)	Chris Riegel (Nebraska) Mark Oates (Oklahoma)	Scott Johnson (Nebraska)	Scott Johnson (Nebraska)
1984	Kevin Ekburg (N. Illinois)	Tim Daggett (UCLA)	Tim Daggett (UCLA)	Chris Riegel (Nebraska)	Tim Daggett (UCLA)	Charles Lakes (Illinois)
1985	Wes Suter (Nebraska)	Tony Piñeda (UCLA)	Mark Diab (Iowa St)	Derrick Cornelius (SUNY Cortland)	Dan Hayden (Arizona St) Noah Riskin (Ohio St) Seth Riskin (Ohio St)	Dan Hayden (Arizona St) Wes Suter (Nebraska)
1986	Jerry Burrell (Arizona St) Brian Ginsberg (UCLA)	Curtis Holdsworth (UCLA)	Mark Diab (Iowa St)	Chad Fox (New Mexico)	Dan Hayden (Arizona St)	Dan Hayden (Arizona St)
1987	Chad Fox (New Mexico)	Li Xiao Ping (Cal St Fullerton)	Paul O'Neill (Houston Baptist)	Chad Fox (New Mexico)	Kevin Davis (Nebraska) Tom Schlesinger (Nebraska)	David Moriel (UCLA)
1988	Chris Wyatt (Temple)	~~Alfonso Rodríguez (Houston Baptist)~~† Mark Sohn (Penn St)	Paul O'Neill (New Mexico)	Chad Fox (New Mexico)	Kevin Davis (Nebraska)	~~Miguel Rubio (Houston Baptist)~~†
1989	Jody Newman (Arizona St)	Mark Sohn (Penn St) Chris Waller (UCLA)	~~Alfonso Rodríguez (Houston Baptist)~~† Paul O'Neill (New Mexico)	Chad Fox (New Mexico)	~~Alfonso Rodríguez (Houston Baptist)~~†	~~Miguel Rubio (Houston Baptist)~~†
1990	Mike Racanelli (Ohio St)	Mark Sohn (Penn St)	Wayne Cowden (Penn St)	Brad Hayashi (UCLA)	Patrick Kirksey (Nebraska)	Chris Waller (UCLA)
1991	Brad Hayashi (UCLA)	Mark Sohn (Penn St)	Adam Carton (Penn St)	Adam Carton (Penn St)	Scott Keswick (UCLA) John Roethlisberger (Minnesota)	Luis López (New Mexico)
1992	Brian Winkler (Michigan)	Che Bowers (Nebraska)	Scott Keswick (UCLA)	Jason Hebert (Syracuse)	Dom Minicucci (Temple)	Jair Lynch (Stanford)
1993	Richard Grace (Nebraska)	John Roethlisberger (Minnesota)	Chris LaMorte (New Mexico)	Steve Wiegel (New Mexico)	Jair Lynch (Stanford)	Steve McCain (UCLA)
1994	Mark Booth (Stanford)	Jason Bertram (California)	Chris LaMorte (New Mexico)	Steve McCain (UCLA)	Richard Grace (Nebraska)	Jim Foody (UCLA)
1995	Jay Thornton (Iowa)	Drew Durbin (Ohio St)	Dave Frank (Temple)	Ian Bachrach (Stanford)	Richard Grace (Nebraska)	Rick Kieffer (Nebraska)
1996	Ian Bachrach (Stanford)	Drew Durbin (Ohio St)	Scott McCall (William & Mary) Blaine Wilson (Ohio St)	Jay Thornton (Iowa)	Jamie Ellis (Stanford) Blaine Wilson (Ohio St)	Carl Imhauser (Temple)
1997	Jeremy Killen (Oklahoma)	Drew Durbin (Ohio St)	Blaine Wilson (Ohio St)	Blaine Wilson (Ohio St)	Marshall Nelson (Nebraska)	Marshall Nelson (Nebraska)
1998	Darin Gerlach (Temple)	Josh Birckelbaw (California)	Dan Fink (Oklahoma)	Travis Romagnoli (Illinois)	Marshall Nelson (Nebraska)	Todd Bishop (Oklahoma)
1999	Jason Hardabura (Nebraska)	Brandon Stefaniak (Penn St)	Cortney Bramwell (BYU)	Guard Young (BYU)	Justin Toman (Michigan)	Todd Bishop (Oklahoma)
2000	Jamie Natalie (Ohio St)	Don Jackson (Iowa) Brandon Stefaniak (Penn St)	Cortney Bramwell (BYU)	Guard Young (BYU)	Justin Toman (Michigan) Kris Zimmerman (Michigan)	Michael Ashe (California)
2001	Clay Strother (Minnesota)	Clay Strother (Minnesota)	Chris Lakeman (Penn St)	Daren Lynch (Ohio St)	Raj Bhavsar (Ohio St)	Michael Ashe (California)
2002	Clay Strother (Minnesota)	Clay Strother (Minnesota)	Marshall Erwin (Stanford)	Dan Gill (Stanford)	Cody Moore (California)	Daniel Diaz-Luong (Michigan)
2003	Josh Landis (Oklahoma)	Josh Landis (Oklahoma)	Kevin Tan (Penn St)	Andrew DiGiore (Michigan)	Daniel Furney (Oklahoma)	Linas Gaveika (Iowa)
2004	Graham Ackerman (California)	Bob Rogers (Illinois)	Kevin Tan (Penn St)	Graham Ackerman (California)	Ramon Jackson (William & Mary)	Justin Spring (Illinois)
2005	Graham Ackerman (California)	Luis Vargas (Penn St)	David Henderson (Oklahoma)	Michael Reavis (Iowa)	Justin Spring (Illinois)	Ronald Ferris (Ohio St)
2006	Jonathan Horton (Oklahoma)	Tim McNeill (California)	Jonathan Horton (Oklahoma)	David Sender (Stanford)	Justin Spring (Illinois) Dylan Carney (Stanford)	Justin Spring (Illinois) Dylan Carney (Stanford)
2007	Jonathan Horton (Oklahoma)	Tim McNeill (California)	Alex Schorsch (Stanford)	David Sender (Stanford) Pejman Ebrahimi (Ohio St)	Tim McNeill (California)	Jonathan Horton (Oklahoma)
2008	Steven Legendre (Oklahoma)	Tim McNeill (California)	Jonathan Horton (Oklahoma)	Steven Legendre (Oklahoma)	Tim McNeill (California)	Paul Ruggeri (Illinois)
2009	Steven Legendre (Oklahoma)	Daniel Ribeiro (Illinois)	Evan Roth (California)	Steven Legendre (Oklahoma)	Paul Ruggeri (Illinois)	Paul Ruggeri (Illinois)
2010	Steven Legendre (Oklahoma)	Alexander Naddour (Oklahoma)	Brandon Wynn (Ohio St)	Eddie Penev (Stanford)	Ryan Lieberman (Stanford)	Ryan McCarthy (Michigan)
2011	Jake Dalton (Oklahoma)	Daniel Ribeiro (Illinois) Alexander Naddour (Oklahoma)	Brandon Wynn (Ohio St)	Jake Dalton (Oklahoma)	Tyler Mizoguchi (Illinois)	Alex Buscaglia (Stanford)
2012	Eddie Penev (Stanford)	Glen Ishino (California)	C. J. Maestas (Illinois)	Eddie Penev (Stanford) Paul Ruggeri (Illinois)	Jake Dalton (Oklahoma)	Sam Mikulak (Michigan)
2013	Trevor Howard (Penn St)	Michael Newburger (Ohio St)	Michael Squires (Oklahoma)	Fred Hartville (Illinois)	Sam Mikulak (Michigan)	Sam Mikulak (Michigan)
2014	Alec Robin (Oklahoma)	Ellis Mannon (Minnesota)	Michael Squires (Oklahoma)	Alec Robin (Oklahoma)	Sam Mikulak (Michigan)	Jordan Valdez (Illinois)
2015	Thad Lawson (Penn St)	Michael Reid (Oklahoma)	Michael Squires (Oklahoma)	Sean Senters (Stanford)	Brian Knott (Stanford)	C. J. Maestas (Illinois)
2016	Colin Van Wicklen (Oklahoma)	Brandon Ngai (Illinois)	Dennis Zaremski (Stanford)	Anthony McCallum (Michigan)	Akash Modi (Stanford)	Akash Modi (Stanford) Alex Johnson (Ohio St)
2017	Yul Moldauer (Oklahoma)	Stephen Nedoroscik (Penn St)	Yul Moldauer (Oklahoma)	Anthony McCallum (Michigan)	Akash Modi (Stanford)	Robert Neff (Stanford)
2018	Yul Moldauer (Oklahoma)	Stephen Nedoroscik (Penn St)	Alex Diab (Illinois)	Yul Moldauer (Oklahoma)	Yul Moldauer (Oklahoma)	Robert Neff (Stanford)
2019	Brody Malone (Stanford)	Alec Yoder (Ohio St)	Alex Diab (Illinois)	Anthony McCallum (Michigan)	Shane Wiskus (Minnesota)	Brody Malone (Stanford)
2020	Canceled due to the COVID-19 pandemic					
2021	Gage Dyer (Oklahoma)	Ian Skirkey (Illinois)	Shane Wiskus (Minnesota)	Gage Dyer (Oklahoma)	Shane Wiskus (Minnesota)	Brody Malone (Stanford)
2022	Bryan Perla (Stanford)	Chase Clingman (Penn St) Brody Malone (Stanford)	Riley Loos (Stanford)	Paul Juda (Michigan)	Curran Phillips (Stanford)	Brody Malone (Stanford)
2023	Nick Kuebler (Stanford)	Ian Skirkey (Illinois)	Ashton Anaya (Illinois)	Asher Hong (Stanford)	Fred Richard (Michigan)	Fred Richard (Michigan)
2024	Paul Juda (Michigan)	Patrick Hoopes (Air Force)	Asher Hong (Stanford)	Asher Hong (Stanford)	Asher Hong (Stanford)	Tate Costa (Illinois)
2025	Asher Hong (Stanford)	Patrick Hoopes (Air Force)	Asher Hong (Stanford)	Kameron Nelson (Ohio State)	Paul Juda (Michigan)	Emre Dodanlı (Oklahoma)
2026	Cooper Kim (Stanford)	Brandon Dang (Illinois)	Asher Cohen (Nebraska)	Jun Iwai (Stanford) Tyler Flores (Oklahoma)	Nathan Roman (Oklahoma)	Kelton Christiansen (Oklahoma)

† Championships vacated by NCAA Committee on Infractions: the NCAA put Houston Baptist on three-year probation for infractions involving Miguel Rubio and Alfonso Rodriguez. The NCAA penalized Houston Baptist for paying for an airline ticket to Spain for Rodriguez and housing Rubio in the student dormitories before he became a student in 1986.

=== Discontinued events ===
Year	Trampoline	Tumbling	Rope Climb	Flying Rings
1938; Details	—N/a	Joe Giallombardo (Illinois)	Bob Sears (Note: As reflected in the NCAA Record Book. Army has also referenced him as Robert Sears.) (Army)	Joe Giallombardo (Illinois)
1939; Details	—N/a	Joe Giallombardo (Illinois)	Ray Belardi (Army)	Ron Hall (USC)
1940; Details	—N/a	Joe Giallombardo (Illinois)	Stan Ellison (Navy)	Bill Butler (Note: As reflected in the NCAA Record Book. Navy has also referenced him as William Butler.) (Navy)
1941; Details	—N/a	John Adkins (Note: As reflected in the NCAA Record Book. Illinois has also referenced him as Jack Adkins.) (Illinois)	Courtney Shanken (Chicago)	Del Daly (Note: As reflected in the NCAA Record Book. Minnesota has also referenced him as Delver Daly.) (Minnesota)
1942; Details	—N/a	George Szypula (Temple)	Dale Cox (Navy)	Jim Parker (Navy)
1948; Details	Gay Hughes (Note: As reflected in the NCAA Record Book. Illinois has also referenced him as Gaylord Hughes.) (Illinois)	Charlie Thompson (Note: As reflected in the NCAA Record Book. California has also referenced him as Chuck Thompson and newspapers have referenced him as Charles Thompson.) (California)	Ken Foreman (USC)	George Hayes (Temple)
1949; Details	Edsel Buchanan (Michigan)	Charlie Thompson (Note: As reflected in the NCAA Record Book. California has also referenced him as Chuck Thompson and newspapers have referenced him as Charles Thompson.) (California)	Ken Foreman (USC)	Jerry Todd (USC)
1949; Details	Edsel Buchanan (Michigan)	Irvin Bedard (Note: Reflected in the NCAA Record Book as Irving Bedard.) (Illinois)	Leo Minotti (Syracuse)	Bob Schneider (Navy)
1951	Edsel Buchanan (Michigan)	Bob Sullivan (Illinois)	Leo Minotti (Syracuse)	Mel Stout (Michigan St)
1952	Dick Gutting (Florida St)	Bob Sullivan (Illinois)	John Claybrook (New York)	Jack Sharp (Florida St)
1953	Bob Hazlett (Iowa)	James Sebbo (Syracuse)	Don Perry (UCLA)	Ken Bartlett (Minnesota)
1954	James Norman (Iowa)	Dick Browning (Illinois)	Don Perry (UCLA)	Manuel Procopio (Penn St)
1955	Richard Albershardt (Indiana)	Lloyd Coahran (USC)	Robert Hammond (UCLA)	George Wikler (USC)
1956	Donald Harper (Ohio St)	Dan Lirot (Illinois)	Philip Mullen (Penn St)	Fred Hoerner (Navy)
1957	Glenn Wilson (W. Illinois)	Frank Hailand (Illinois)	Garvin Smith (Cal St LA)	Thomas Darling (Pittsburgh)
1958	Donald Harper (Ohio St)	Frank Hailand (Illinois)	Garvin Smith (Cal St LA)	Thomas Darling (Pittsburgh)
1959	Ed Cole (Michigan)	Dave Dulaney (Penn St)	Don Littlewood (Penn St)	Jay Werner (Penn St)
1960	Larry Snyder (Iowa)	Alvin Barasch (Illinois)	Nelson Hulme (Navy)	John Aaronsohn (Army) Jay Werner (Penn St)
1961	Tom Gompf (Ohio St)	Jack Ryder (Florida St)	Paul Davis (California)	Frank Snay (Navy)
1962	Steve Johnson (Michigan St)	Rusty Mitchell (S. Illinois)	Paul Davis (California)	—N/a
1963	Gary Erwin (Michigan)	Hal Holmes (Illinois)	—N/a	—N/a
1964	Gary Erwin (Michigan)	Rusty Mitchell (S. Illinois)	—N/a	—N/a
1965	Frank Schmitz (S. Illinois)	—N/a	—N/a	—N/a
1966	Wayne Miller (Michigan)	—N/a	—N/a	—N/a
1967	Dave Jacobs (Michigan)	—N/a	—N/a	—N/a
1968	George Huntzicker (Michigan)	—N/a	—N/a	—N/a
1969	Dave Jacobs (Michigan)	—N/a	—N/a	—N/a
1970	George Huntzicker (Michigan)	—N/a	—N/a	—N/a

Before 1969, trampoline was one of the events that comprised the NCAA gymnastics championships. The NCAA continued to bestow a separate team national title in trampoline for two years. Michigan won both. For several years, there was an annual membership vote on whether to remove it as an NCAA competition, resulting in removal by 1971.

== Champions ==
=== Team Titles ===
Schools With National Championships
12 Championships, 11 Championships, 10 Championships, 8 Championships, 7 Championships, 4 Championships, 3 Championships, 2 Championships, 1 Championship

=== Active Programs ===
Team	Record	Years won
Penn State	12	1948, 1953, 1954, 1957, 1959, 1960, 1961, 1965, 1976, 2000, 2004, 2007
Oklahoma	12	1977, 1978, 1991, 2002, 2003, 2005, 2006, 2008, 2015, 2016, 2017, 2018
Stanford	11	1992, 1993, 1995, 2009, 2011, 2019, 2021, 2022, 2023, 2024, 2026
Illinois	10	1939, 1940, 1941, 1942, 1950, 1955, 1956, 1958, 1989, 2012
Nebraska	8	1979, 1980, 1981, 1982, 1983, 1988, 1990, 1994
Michigan	7	1963, 1970, 1999, 2010, 2013, 2014, 2025
California	4	1968, 1975, 1997, 1998
Ohio State	3	1985, 1996, 2001

=== Former programs ===
Team	Record	Years won
Southern Illinois	4	1964, 1966, 1967, 1972
Iowa State	3	1971, 1973, 1974
UCLA	2	1984, 1987
Florida State	2	1951, 1952
Arizona State	1	1986
Indiana State	1	1977
Iowa	1	1969
USC	1	1962
Michigan State	1	1958
Temple	1	1949
Chicago	1	1938

== See also ==
- NCAA Division II Men's Gymnastics Championships (1968–82)
- NCAA Women's Gymnastics Championships (1982–present)
- Pre-NCAA Gymnastics Champions
- List of gymnastics terms
