= 1953 NCAA gymnastics championships =

American college gymnastics competition

Tournament information
- Sport: Collegiate gymnastics
- Location: (New York (state)) Syracuse, New York
- Host(s): Syracuse University
- Venue(s): Archbold Gymnasium
- Participants: 13 teams

Final positions
- Champions: Penn State (2nd title)
- 1st runners-up: Illinois
- 2nd runners-up: Syracuse

Tournament statistics
- All-Around Champion(s): (Sweden) Jean Cronstedt, Penn State (1,275 points)

The 1953 NCAA gymnastics championships were contested at the 11th annual NCAA-sanctioned gymnastics meet to determine the team and individual national champions of men's collegiate gymnastics among its member programs in the United States.

These championships were contested at Archbold Gymnasium at Syracuse University in Syracuse, New York.

Accumulating the most points across the individual events, Penn State won the team national championship, the Nittany Lions' second and first since 1948.

The individual all-around championship was won by Jean Cronstedt, also from Penn State.

== Team results ==
- (H) = Hosts
- (DC) = Defending champions
- Italics = Debut appearance

Rank	Team	Points
1st place, gold medalist(s)	Penn State	91.5
2nd place, silver medalist(s)	Illinois	68
3rd place, bronze medalist(s)	Syracuse (H)	51
4	UCLA	48.5
5	Florida State (DC)	43.5
6	Minnesota	40
7	Michigan State	38
8	Army	31.5
9	Iowa	29
10	USC	28
11	Navy	23
12	Ohio State	7
13	California	4

== See also ==
- Pre-NCAA Gymnastics Champions
