= 1948 NCAA gymnastics championships =

American college gymnastics competition

- 1948
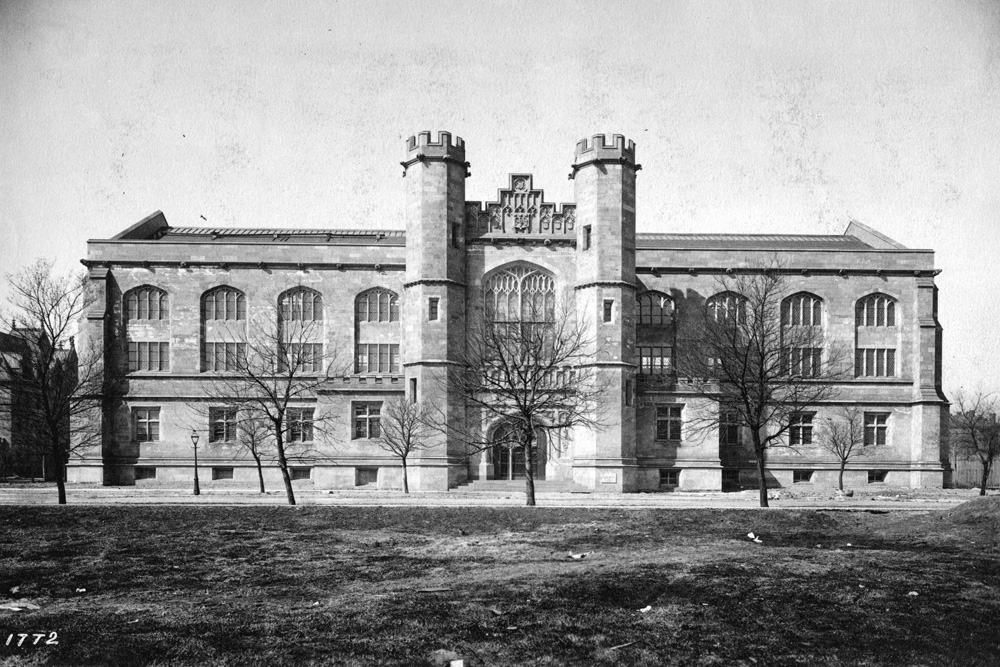
- Bartlett Gymnasium, site of the 1948 NCAA gymnastics championships

Tournament information
- Sport: Collegiate gymnastics
- Location: Chicago, Illinois
- Date: March 27, 1948
- Administrator: National Collegiate Athletic Association
- Host(s): University of Chicago
- Venue(s): Bartlett Gymnasium
- Participants: 10 teams (Note: As reflected in the NCAA Record Book. Newspaper articles state participation from Navy who scored 0 points.)

Final positions
- Champions: Penn State (1st title)
- 1st runners-up: Temple
- 2nd runners-up: Illinois

Tournament statistics
- All-Around Champion: Ray Sorensen, Penn State (1537)

The 1948 NCAA gymnastics championships were contested at the sixth annual National Collegiate Athletic Association-sanctioned men's gymnastics championships to determine the team and individual national champions of men's collegiate gymnastics among its member programs in the United States. Due to the interruption of sporting events caused by World War II, these were the first championships held since 1942.

The championships were hosted by the University of Chicago at Bartlett Gymnasium in Chicago, Illinois. It was the location's 5th time hosting out of 6 total events, but following 1948 the championships would not return to Chicago until 2018.

Four-time defending champions Illinois, who won the last event in 1942, were bested by Gene Wettstone-led Penn State. It was the Nittany Lions' first team gymnastics championship.

The individual all-around championship was won by Ray Sorensen from Penn State.

== Team results ==
The table below reflects the official NCAA record books. However, newspaper recaps of the event reported participation by Navy who scored 0 points.

Rank	Team	Points
1st place, gold medalist(s)	Penn State	55
2nd place, silver medalist(s)	Temple	34.5
3rd place, bronze medalist(s)	Illinois	22.5
4	Minnesota	14
5	California	12
6	Michigan	7
7	UCLA	5.5
8	Nebraska	1.5
9	Chicago	1
9	USC	1

== Individual event finals ==
According to the NCAA record books, Free Exercise (now known as the Floor Exercise) did not award a championship in 1948. However, newspaper reports show the event taking place.

=== Medalists ===
Event	Gold	Silver	Bronze
Individual All-Around	Ray Sorensen, Penn State (1537)	William Bonsall, Penn State (1462)	Jim Peterson, Minnesota (1415.5)
Side Horse (Note: Currently known as Pommel Horse)	Steve Greene (Note: As reflected in the NCAA Record Book. Penn State has also referenced him as Stephen Greene.), Penn State (286)	Vito Zinzi, Illinois (283)	Joe Berenato, Temple (275)
Long Horse (Note: Currently known as Vault)	Jim Peterson, Minnesota (260.5)	William Vrettos, Chicago; Vito Zinzi, Illinois (258.5)	—
Parallel Bars	Ray Sorensen, Penn State (285)	Steve Greene (Note: As reflected in the NCAA Record Book. Penn State has also referenced him as Stephen Greene.), Penn State (280)	Bob Stout, Temple (273)
Horizontal Bar	Joe Calvetti, Illinois (269)	Jim Peterson, Minnesota (261.3)	William Bonsall, Penn State (259)
Trampoline	Gay Hughes (Note: As reflected in the NCAA Record Book. Illinois has also referenced him as Gaylord Hughes.), Illinois (266)	Charles Lucchesi, California (248)	Thomas Tillman, Michigan (247)
Tumbling	Charlie Thompson (Note: As reflected in the NCAA Record Book. California has also referenced him as Chuck Thompson and newspapers have referenced him as Charles Thompson.), California (269)	Bill Meade, Penn State (248)	Robert McKinney, Temple (233)
Rope Climb	Ken Foreman, USC (3.5 sec.)	Joseph Linn, Penn State (4.0 sec.)	George Hoffman, Navy (4.4 sec.)
Flying Rings	George Hayes, Temple (268)	William Bonsall, Penn State (266)	William Winnenberger, Temple (257)

== See also ==
- Pre-NCAA Gymnastics Champions
