= 1941 NCAA gymnastics championships =

American college gymnastics competition

- 1941
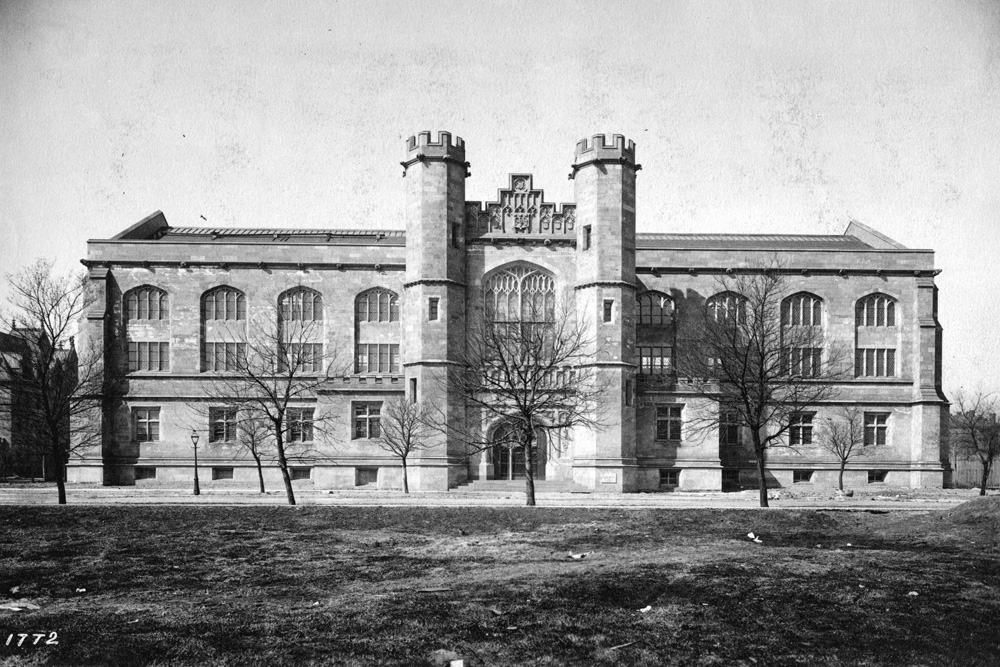
- Bartlett Gymnasium, site of the 1941 NCAA gymnastics championships

Tournament information
- Sport: Collegiate gymnastics
- Location: Chicago, Illinois
- Date: April 12, 1941
- Administrator: National Collegiate Athletic Association
- Host(s): University of Chicago
- Venue(s): Bartlett Gymnasium
- Participants: 4 teams

Final positions
- Champions: Illinois (3rd title)
- 1st runners-up: Minnesota
- 2nd runners-up: Chicago

Tournament statistics
- All-Around Champion: Courtney Shanken, Chicago (2832.50)

The 1941 NCAA gymnastics championships were contested at the fourth annual National Collegiate Athletic Association-sanctioned men's gymnastics championships to determine the team and individual national champions of men's collegiate gymnastics among its member programs in the United States.

For the fourth year, the championships were hosted by the University of Chicago at Bartlett Gymnasium in Chicago, Illinois.

Two-time defending champions Illinois, led by coach Hartley Price, successfully defended their title and won the program's 3rd straight and 3rd overall team championship.

The individual all-around championship went to Courtney Shanken from Chicago.

== Team results ==
The table below reflects the official NCAA record books. However, a recap of the event reported Illinois's score as 68 and Minnesota's score as 52.

Rank	Team	Points
1st place, gold medalist(s)	Illinois	68.5
2nd place, silver medalist(s)	Minnesota	52.5
3rd place, bronze medalist(s)	Chicago	39.5
4	Temple	15.5

== Individual event finals ==
After the addition of the Calisthenics (now known as the Floor Exercise) to the 1941 program, eight individual national championship events were held in addition to the All-Around. The champion is reflected in the official NCAA record books, but a newspaper report does not mention the event.

=== Medalists ===
Event	Gold	Silver	Bronze
Individual All-Around	Courtney Shanken, Chicago (2832.50)	Newt Loken, Minnesota (2790.33)	Louis Fina, Illinois (2786.62)
Calisthenics (Note: Currently known as Floor)	Ed Danser, Temple (271)	Unknown	Unknown
Side Horse (Note: Currently known as Pommel Horse)	Caton Cobb, Illinois (555)	Harry Koehnemann, Illinois (550)	Ed Danser, Temple (534)
Long Horse (Note: Currently known as Vault)	Earl Shanken, Chicago (797.7)	Jim Baley, Illinois (774.4)	Courtney Shanken, Chicago (769.5)
Parallel Bars	Caton Cobb, Illinois (544)	Paul Fina, Illinois (527)	Bob Hanning, Minnesota (522)
Horizontal Bar	Newt Loken, Minnesota (555.5)	Louis Fina, Illinois (518)	Courtney Shanken, Chicago (514)
Tumbling	John Adkins (Note: As reflected in the NCAA Record Book. Illinois has also referenced him as Jack Adkins.), Illinois (574)	Newt Loken, Minnesota (564)	George Szypula, Temple (549)
Rope Climb	Courtney Shanken, Chicago (7.5 sec.)	Harold Brown, Illinois; Frank Grossman, Minnesota (8.1 sec.)	—
Flying Rings	Del Daly (Note: As reflected in the NCAA Record Book. Minnesota has also referenced him as Delver Daly.), Minnesota (537.5)	Louis Fina, Illinois (533.25)	Paul Fina, Illinois (526.25)

== See also ==
- Pre-NCAA Gymnastics Champions
