= 1940 NCAA gymnastics championships =

American college gymnastics competition

- 1940
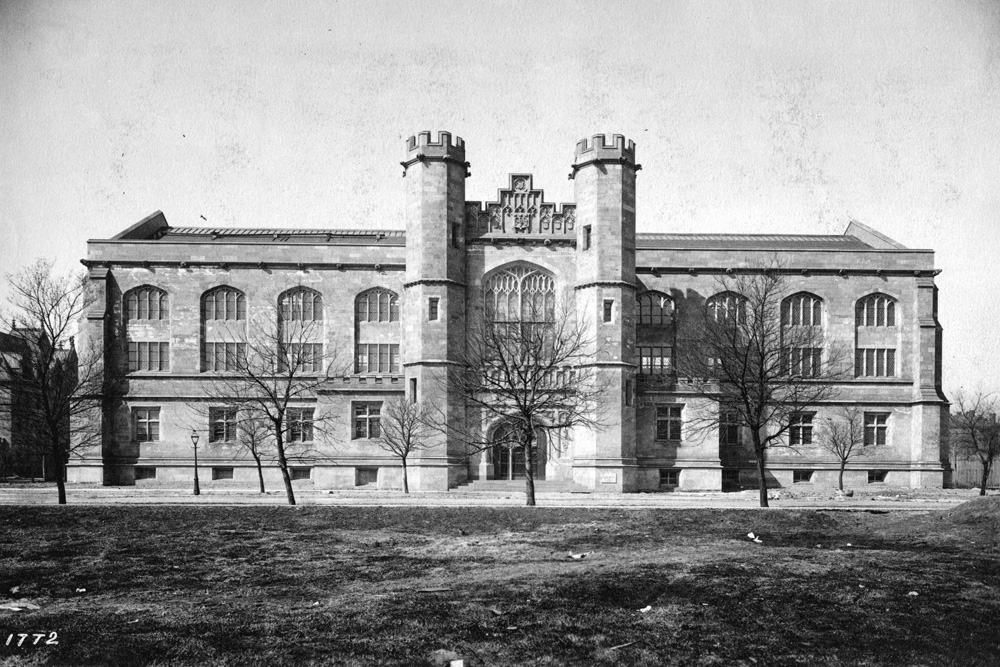
- Bartlett Gymnasium, site of the 1940 NCAA gymnastics championships

Tournament information
- Sport: Collegiate gymnastics
- Location: Chicago, Illinois
- Date: April 13, 1940
- Administrator: National Collegiate Athletic Association
- Host(s): University of Chicago
- Venue(s): Bartlett Gymnasium
- Participants: 5 teams (Note: As reflected in the NCAA Record Book. Newspaper articles state participation from Denison University who scored 0 points.)

Final positions
- Champions: Illinois (2nd title)
- Runner-up: Navy; Temple (Note: As reflected in the NCAA Record Book. Newspaper articles state Temple finished 4th place with 16 points. Third place would then belong to Minnesota who scored 16.5 points.)

Tournament statistics
- Attendance: 1,200
- All-Around Champion: Joe Giallombardo, Illinois; Paul Fina, Illinois (2331)

The 1940 NCAA gymnastics championships were contested at the third annual National Collegiate Athletic Association-sanctioned men's gymnastics championships to determine the team and individual national champions of men's collegiate gymnastics among its member programs in the United States.

For the third year, the championships were hosted by the University of Chicago at Bartlett Gymnasium in Chicago, Illinois.

Defending champions Illinois, led by coach Hartley Price, successfully defended their title and won the program's 2nd overall team championship.

For the third consecutive year, a share of the individual all-around championship went to Joe Giallombardo from Illinois who was tied with teammate Paul Fina who won his first all-around championship.

== Team results ==
The table below reflects the official NCAA record books. However, an Associated Press recap of the event reported Temple finished in 4th place with 16 points. As such, third place was reportedly awarded to Minnesota. Additionally, while not reflected below, the recap reported participation by Denison University who scored 0 points.

Rank	Team	Points
1st place, gold medalist(s)	Illinois	20
2nd place, silver medalist(s)	Navy	17
2nd place, silver medalist(s)	Temple	17
4	Minnesota	16.5
5	Chicago	7.5

== Individual event finals ==
=== Medalists ===
Event	Gold	Silver	Bronze
Individual All-Around	Joe Giallombardo, Illinois; Paul Fina, Illinois (2331)	—	Louis Fina, Illinois (2329)
Side Horse (Note: Currently known as Pommel Horse)	Harry Koehnemann, Illinois (535)	Ed Danser, Temple (518)	James Ronning, Minnesota (513)
Long Horse (Note: Currently known as Vault)	Earl Shanken, Chicago (82.44)	Louis Fina, Illinois (75.60)	Charles Houston, Temple (74.31)
Parallel Bars	Bob Hanning, Minnesota (539)	Joe Giallombardo, Illinois (510)	Ed Danser, Temple (505)
Horizontal Bar	Norm Boardman, Temple (550)	Newt Loken, Minnesota (532)	James Ronning, Minnesota (520)
Tumbling	Joe Giallombardo, Illinois (545)	Newt Loken, Minnesota; Alan Robertson, Chicago (544)	—
Rope Climb	Stan Ellison, Navy (4.5 sec.)	Louis Davis, Navy (4.7 sec.)	Karl Stefan, Navy (5.4 sec.)
Flying Rings	Bill Butler (Note: As reflected in the NCAA Record Book. Navy has also referenced him as William Butler.), Navy (566)	Samuel Fogel, Temple (507)	Newt Loken, Minnesota (503)

== See also ==
- Pre-NCAA Gymnastics Champions
