= 1942 NCAA gymnastics championships =

American college gymnastics competition

- 1942
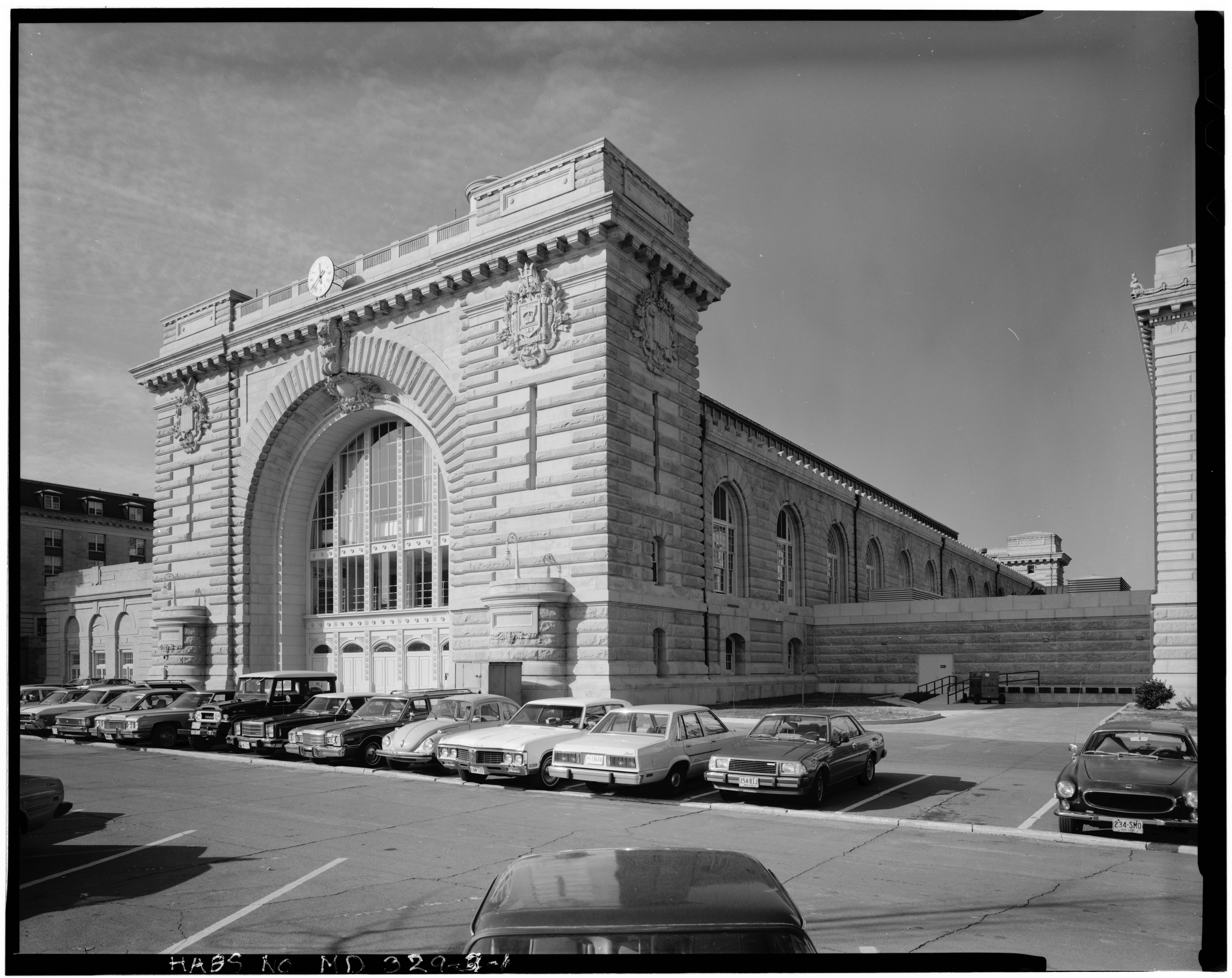
- Macdonough Hall, site of the 1942 NCAA gymnastics championships

Tournament information
- Sport: Collegiate gymnastics
- Location: Annapolis, Maryland
- Date: March 28, 1942
- Administrator: National Collegiate Athletic Association
- Host(s): United States Naval Academy
- Venue(s): Macdonough Hall
- Participants: 7 teams (Note: As reflected in the NCAA Record Book. Newspaper articles state participation from Maryland who scored 0 points.)

Final positions
- Champions: Illinois (4th title)
- 1st runners-up: Penn State
- 2nd runners-up: Minnesota

Tournament statistics
- All-Around Champion: Newt Loken, Minnesota (1233.8)

The 1942 NCAA gymnastics championships were contested at the fifth annual National Collegiate Athletic Association-sanctioned men's gymnastics championships to determine the team and individual national champions of men's collegiate gymnastics among its member programs in the United States.

The championships were hosted by the United States Naval Academy at Macdonough Hall in Annapolis, Maryland which marked the first time the event wasn't hosted by the University of Chicago at Bartlett Gymnasium in Chicago, Illinois.

Three-time defending champions Illinois, led by coach Hartley Price, successfully defended their title and won the program's 4th straight and 4th overall team championship.

The individual all-around championship went to Newt Loken from Minnesota.

Due to the onset of World War II, this would be the final NCAA men's gymnastics championships until 1948, six years later.

== Team results ==
The table below reflects the official NCAA record books. However, newspaper recaps of the event reported participation by Maryland who scored 0 points.

Rank	Team	Points
1st place, gold medalist(s)	Illinois	39
2nd place, silver medalist(s)	Penn State	30
3rd place, bronze medalist(s)	Minnesota	23
4	Temple	20
5	Chicago	17
6	Navy	13
7	Army	12

== Individual event finals ==
According to the NCAA record books, Calisthenics (now known as the Floor Exercise) which was added last year, did not note a champion for 1942. Additionally, newspaper reports do not mention the event either.

=== Medalists ===
Event	Gold	Silver	Bronze
Individual All-Around	Newt Loken, Minnesota (1233.8)	Caton Cobb, Illinois (1100.5)	Courtney Shanken, Chicago (1094.6)
Side Horse (Note: Currently known as Pommel Horse)	Caton Cobb, Illinois (260)	William Blattman, Navy (247)	Courtney Shanken, Chicago (238)
Long Horse (Note: Currently known as Vault)	Earl Shanken, Chicago (68.31)	Louis Fina, Illinois (67.58)	Newt Loken, Minnesota (67.21)
Parallel Bars	Hal Zimmerman (Note: As reflected in the NCAA Record Book. Penn State has also referenced him as Harold Zimmerman.), Penn State (270 (Note: As reflected in the NCAA Record Book. Newspaper articles reported the score as 268.))	Caton Cobb, Illinois (267)	Newt Loken, Minnesota (254)
Horizontal Bar	Norm Boardman, Temple (263)	Edwin Trybala, Penn State (246)	George Eberle, Army (245)
Tumbling	George Szypula, Temple (285)	Newt Loken, Minnesota (265)	Harold Zimmerman, Penn State (265)
Rope Climb	Dale Cox, Navy (4.0 sec.)	George Davis, Navy (4.0 sec.)	E. Leavey, Army (4.3 sec.)
Flying Rings	Jim Parker, Navy (153 (Note: As reflected in the NCAA Record Book. Newspaper articles reported the score as 253.))	W. Hughes, Army (250)	Sydney Rudman, Penn State (239)

== See also ==
- Pre-NCAA Gymnastics Champions
