= 1939 NCAA gymnastics championships =

American college gymnastics competition

- 1939
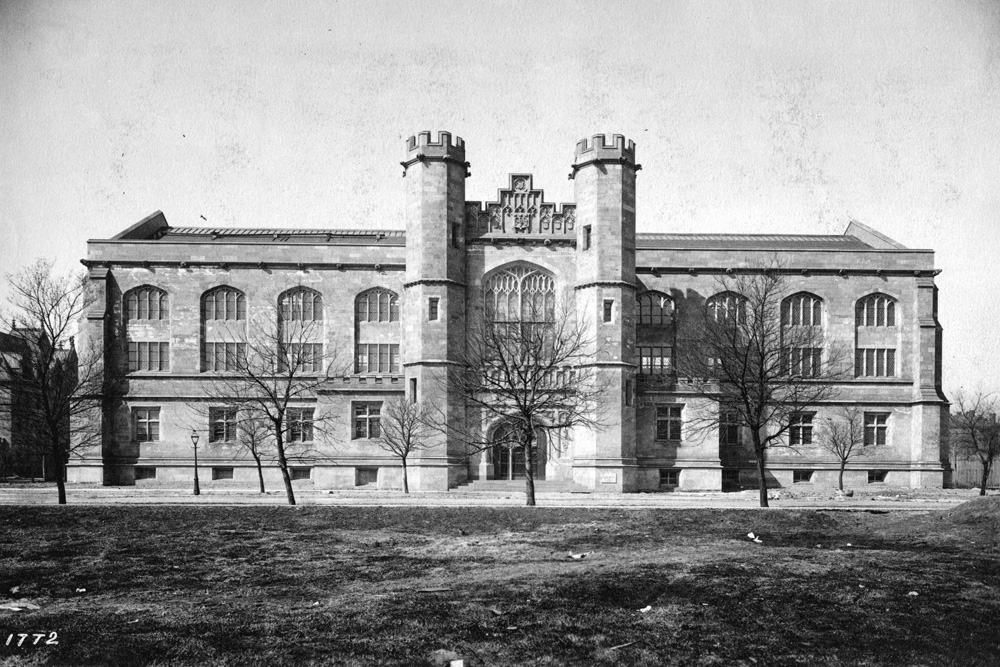
- Bartlett Gymnasium, site of the 1939 NCAA gymnastics championships

Tournament information
- Sport: Collegiate gymnastics
- Location: Chicago, Illinois
- Date: April 15, 1939
- Administrator: National Collegiate Athletic Association
- Host(s): University of Chicago
- Venue(s): Bartlett Gymnasium
- Participants: 6 teams

Final positions
- Champions: Illinois (1st title)
- 1st runners-up: Army
- 2nd runners-up: USC

Tournament statistics
- All-Around Champion: Joe Giallombardo, Illinois (2471)

The 1939 NCAA gymnastics championships were contested at the second annual National Collegiate Athletic Association-sanctioned men's gymnastics championships to determine the team and individual national champions of men's collegiate gymnastics among its member programs in the United States.

For the second year, the championships were hosted by the University of Chicago. The meet took place at Bartlett Gymnasium in Chicago, Illinois.

Illinois, led by coach Hartley Price, finished on top of the team standings, the Fighting Illini's first title.

For the second consecutive year, the individual all-around championship went to Joe Giallombardo from Illinois.

== Team results ==
Rank	Team	Points
1st place, gold medalist(s)	Illinois	21
2nd place, silver medalist(s)	Army	17
3rd place, bronze medalist(s)	USC	13
4	Temple	11
5	Minnesota	8
6	Chicago	7

== Individual event finals ==
=== Medalists ===
Event	Gold	Silver	Bronze
Individual All-Around	Joe Giallombardo, Illinois (2471)	Erwin Beyer, Chicago Maroons (2462)	James Roberts, USC (2391)
Side Horse (Note: Currently known as Pommel Horse)	Erwin Beyer, Chicago Maroons (528)	Matthew Whalen, Army (516)	James Ronning, Minnesota (512)
Long Horse (Note: Currently known as Vault)	Marv Forman, Illinois (180.6)	Samuel Fogel, Temple (179.5)	Joe Giallombardo, Illinois (167.4)
Parallel Bars	Bob Sears (Note: As reflected in the NCAA Record Book. Army has also referenced him as Robert Sears.), Army (535)	James Hafey, Minnesota (510)	Joe Giallombardo, Illinois (509)
Horizontal Bar	Adam Walters, Temple (546)	Bob Sears (Note: As reflected in the NCAA Record Book. Army has also referenced him as Robert Sears.), Army (539)	Del Daly (Note: As reflected in the NCAA Record Book. Minnesota has also referenced him as Delver Daly.), Minnesota (529)
Tumbling	Joe Giallombardo, Illinois (573)	Ray Weiss, Illinois (530)	Bill Goldstein, Illinois (518)
Rope Climb	Ray Belardi, Army (4.4 sec.)	Norman Parrish, USC (4.5 sec.)	Ron Hall, USC (5.1 sec.)
Flying Rings	Ron Hall, USC (554)	Ed Danser, Temple (534)	W. Roberts, USC (531)

== See also ==
- Pre-NCAA Gymnastics Champions
