= William Bonsall =

American gymnast (1923 – 2015)

- Full name: William Alfred Bonsall
- Born: December 31, 1923 Philadelphia, Pennsylvania, U.S.
- Died: February 23, 2015 (aged 91) Morgantown, West Virginia, U.S.

Gymnastics career
- Discipline: Men's artistic gymnastics
- Country represented: United States
- College team: Penn State Nittany Lions (1943–1949)
- Club: John Bartram High School
- Head coach: Gene Wettstone
- Retired: c. 1949
Medal record
Men's artistic gymnastics
Representing Penn State Nittany Lions
Event	1st	2nd	3rd
NCAA Championships	1	2	1
Total	1	2	1
NCAA Championships
Gold medal – first place	1948 Chicago	Team
Silver medal – second place	1948 Chicago	All-around
Silver medal – second place	1948 Chicago	Flying rings
Bronze medal – third place	1948 Chicago	Horizontal bar

William Alfred Bonsall (December 31, 1923 – February 23, 2015) was an American gymnast. He was a member of the United States men's national artistic gymnastics team and competed in eight events at the 1948 Summer Olympics.

== Early life and education ==
Bonsall attended John Bartram High School and competed for the school's gymnastics team. He later enrolled at Pennsylvania State University to pursue gymnastics.

== Gymnastics career ==
Bonsall was a member of the Penn State Nittany Lions men's gymnastics team from 1943 to 1949. He was named as an NCAA All-American in the All-Around in 1948 as Penn State won the 1948 NCAA Men's Gymnastics Championship. The following season, he served as captain during his final year with the team.

He later coached gymnastics at West Virginia University.
