= 1938 NCAA gymnastics championships =

American college gymnastics competition

- 1938
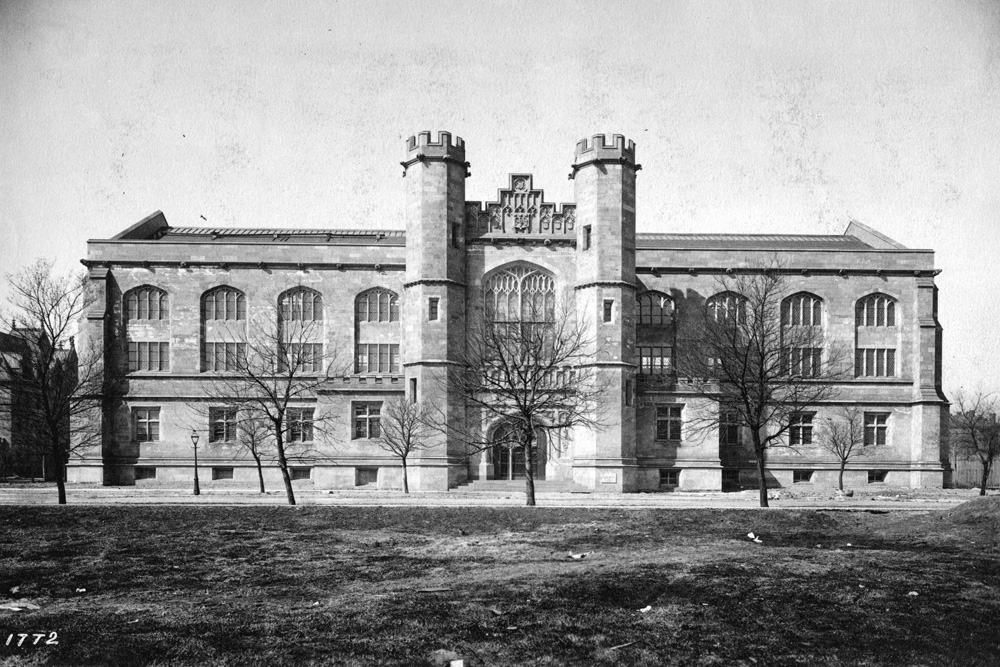
- Bartlett Gymnasium, site of the 1938 NCAA gymnastics championships

Tournament information
- Sport: Collegiate gymnastics
- Location: Chicago, Illinois
- Date: April 16, 1938
- Administrator: National Collegiate Athletic Association
- Host(s): University of Chicago
- Venue(s): Bartlett Gymnasium
- Participants: 8 teams

Final positions
- Champions: Chicago (1st title)
- 1st runners-up: Illinois
- 2nd runners-up: Army

Tournament statistics
- All-Around Champion: Joe Giallombardo, Illinois (2509)

The 1938 NCAA gymnastics championships were contested at the first annual National Collegiate Athletic Association-sanctioned men's gymnastics championships to determine the team and individual national champions of men's collegiate gymnastics among its member programs in the United States.

These championships were hosted by the University of Chicago at Bartlett Gymnasium in Chicago, Illinois.

Hosts Chicago, led by coach Dan Hoffer, topped the team standings and claimed the inaugural team title.

The individual all-around championship went to Joe Giallombardo from Illinois.

== Team results ==
Rank	Team	Points
1st place, gold medalist(s)	Chicago	22
2nd place, silver medalist(s)	Illinois	18
3rd place, bronze medalist(s)	Army	12
4	Minnesota	9
5	Temple	8
6	Gustavus Adolphus	3
6	USC	3
8	Washington	2

== Individual event finals ==
=== Medalists ===
Event	Gold	Silver	Bronze
Individual All-Around	Joe Giallombardo, Illinois (2509)	Erwin Beyer, Chicago Maroons (2464)	Chester Nelson, Gustavus Adolphus (2292)
Side Horse (Note: Currently known as Pommel Horse)	Erwin Beyer, Chicago Maroons	Paul Johnson, Minnesota	Joseph Hewlett, Temple
Long Horse (Note: Currently known as Vault)	Erwin Beyer, Chicago Maroons	James Roberts, USC	Joe Giallombardo, Illinois
Parallel Bars	Erwin Beyer, Chicago Maroons	Joseph Hewlett, Temple	Bob Sears (Note: Army has referenced him as Robert Sears.), Army
Horizontal Bar	Bob Sears (Note: Army has referenced him as Robert Sears.), Army	Curtis Lynum, Minnesota	Adam Walters, Temple
Tumbling	Joe Giallombardo, Illinois (590)	Bill Goldstein, Illinois	Ray Weiss, Illinois
Rope Climb	Bob Sears (Note: Army has referenced him as Robert Sears.), Army (5.0 sec.)	Joe Giallombardo, Illinois	Chester Tanaka, Washington
Flying Rings	Joe Giallombardo, Illinois	Chester Nelson, Gustavus Adolphus	Curtis Lynum, Minnesota

== See also ==
- Pre-NCAA Gymnastics Champions
