= Daniel Ribeiro =

Daniel Ribeiro may refer to:

- Daniel Ribeiro (director) (born 1982), Brazilian film director
- Daniel Ribeiro (gymnast) (born 1989), American artistic gymnast
