= Ray Sorensen =

Ray Sorensen may refer to:

- Ray Sorensen (gymnast)
- Ray Sorensen (politician)
