= 2025 NCAA men's gymnastics championship =

Men's Gymnastics Championship

2025 NCAA Men's Gymnastics Championships
- Venue: Crisler Center
- Location: Ann Arbor, Michigan
- Date: April 18–19, 2025
- Competitors: Oklahoma; Michigan; Stanford; Nebraska; Penn State; Illinois; Ohio State; Air Force; California; Navy; Army West Point; William & Mary

Champion
- Michigan

The 2025 NCAA men's gymnastics championships was held at the Crisler Center in Ann Arbor, Michigan on April 18–19, 2025. The University of Michigan hosted for the fourth time. Michigan won their seventh national championship.

== Championship Qualifiers ==
Two pre-qualifying sessions took place on April 18. Session 1 will start at 1PM EST, Session II at 7PM EST. Both aired on ESPN+. The national qualifying average was used to determine the seeding of teams in each session.

=== Session I ===
Ranking	Team	Floor	Pommel horse	Rings	Vault	Parallel bars	High bars	Total
No. 04	Nebraska	324.894						
No. 01	Oklahoma	323.460						
No. 05	Penn State	321.992						
No. 09	California	319.091						
No. 08	Air Force	313.526						
No. 12	William & Mary	307.691						

=== Session II ===
Ranking	Team	Floor	Pommel horse	Rings	Vault	Parallel bars	High bars	Total
No. 02	Michigan	329.824						
No. 03	Stanford	329.028						
No. 06	Illinois	323.194						
No. 07	Ohio State	319.459						
No. 11	Army	311.091						
No. 10	Navy	308.056						

== NCAA Championship ==
The top three teams and the top three all-arounders not on one of the qualifying teams, plus the top three individuals on each event not already qualified on a team or as an all-arounder, will advance from each qualifying session to the finals.

The finals aired on ESPN 2 at 6:30PM EST.

Teams:

- Illinois
- Michigan
- Nebraska
- Oklahoma
- Penn State
- Stanford

=== Standings ===
- National Champion: Michigan – 332.224
- 2nd Place: Stanford – 332.061
- 3rd Place: Oklahoma – 327.891

=== Results ===
Ranking	Team	Floor	Pommel horse	Rings	Vault	Parallel bars	High bars	Total
1st	Michigan	56.165	53.232	55.598	56.599	55.832	54.798	332.224
2nd	Stanford	55.933	52.232	56.199	57.432	55.899	54.366	332.061
3rd	Oklahoma	54.531	53.566	54.565	56.532	54.732	53.965	327.891
4th	Nebraska	55.164	52.832	55.265	56.665	53.031	53.265	326.222
5th	Penn State	51.598	53.698	53.866	55.699	51.998	50.399	317.258
6th	Illinois	52.232	52.932	52.099	54.532	51.765	52.733	316.293

== Individual Event Qualifiers ==
The individual event qualifiers were named on April 8 by the NCAA Men’s Gymnastics Committee. The individual event qualifiers will also take place on Sunday, April 19 and air on ESPN2.

The top three all-around competitors not on one of the qualifying teams, plus the top three individuals on each event not already qualified on a team or as an all-around competitor, will advance from each pre-qualifying session to the finals session.

=== Medalists ===
Event	Gold	Silver	Bronze
Individual all-around	Fred Richard (Michigan)	Paul Juda (Michigan)	Fuzzy Benas (Oklahoma)
Floor	Asher Hong (Stanford)	Chase Mondi (Nebraska)	Kameron Nelson (Ohio State)
Pommel horse	Patrick Hoopes (Air Force)	Aidan Li (California)	Khoi Young (Stanford)
Rings	Asher Hong (Stanford)	Mark Berlaga (Stanford)	Tas Hajdu (Oklahoma)
Vault	Kameron Nelson (Ohio State)	Asher Hong (Stanford)	Garrett Schooley (Illinois)
Parallel bars	Paul Juda (Michigan)	Colt Walker (Stanford)	Evgeny Siminiuc (Michigan)
Horizontal bar	Emre Dodanli (Oklahoma)	Fred Richard (Michigan); Carson Eshleman (Michigan)	—N/a
