= Graham Ackerman =

American gymnast (born 1983)

- Full name: Graham Samuel Ackerman
- Born: July 14, 1983 (age 43) Seattle, Washington, U.S.
- Height: 5 ft 8 in (173 cm)

Gymnastics career
- Discipline: Men's artistic gymnastics
- College team: California Golden Bears (2002–2005)
- Head coach: Barry Weiner
- Retired: c. 2005

Graham Samuel Ackerman (born July 14, 1983) is an American gymnast. In April 2005, he won the national championship in the floor exercise event at the 2005 NCAA Men's Gymnastics championship at the United States Military Academy at West Point, New York, making him a three-time national champ. In 2004, he won the national titles in two events—floor and vault. Ackerman is openly gay.

== Career ==
During his early career, Ackerman had many large accomplishments. In 1995, he was the Washington state men's gymnastics champion. In 1997 and 1998, he competed in junior nationals. In 1999, Graham was once again Washington state men's gymnastics champion and the regional all-around champion. 2001 was a big year for Ackerman. He competed in United States nationals where he placed 1st in the floor and the vault exercises and 9th in the all-around. He was also the regional all-around champion and junior national floor and vault champion. During the summer of 2003, Ackerman competed at the USA championships in Milwaukee, Wisconsin where he won the silver medal on vault. In August 2003, Ackerman was chosen to represent the United States at the World Championships in Taegu, Korea.

Ackerman began attending University of California-Berkeley in 2002. His freshman season began with a slow start due to an ankle injury. However, he recovered with time to earn All-American honors in p-bar with a score of 8.575 which earned him 6th place at NCAAs. In his second-ever intercollegiate meet, a Stanford Invite, Ackerman earned a score of 9.775 on the floor which was a team season-high. Later on this season, Ackerman competed strongly at Gold's Challenge in Santa Barbara. Here, he scored a career-high 8.700 on the pommel horse and a solid 8.750 on the horizontal bar. He also earned Academic All-American honors.

In 2008, Ackerman earned a Master's degree from the London School of Economics.
