= Dennis Hayden (gymnast) =

American artistic gymnast

Dennis Hayden was an American gymnast in the 1980s.

== Early life and education ==
Hayden was born in 1965 in Buffalo, New York. He is the brother of gymnast Dan Hayden. Dennis Hayden was a member of the Junior National Team from 1977 to 1983. In 1979, Hayden won gold in the all-around, still rings, vault, and horizontal bar at the Junior Olympics for the 12- to 14-year-old group. As a 14-year-old, Hayden and his brother moved to Arizona to train for the 1984 Summer Olympics. Hayden failed to qualify for that event.

== Gymnastics career ==
=== College ===
From 1984 to 1986, Hayden and his brother attended and competed at Arizona State University. In 1985, Hayden tore his anterior cruciate ligament. However, he elected to continue training while wearing a knee brace rather than having reconstructive surgery. In 1986, Hayden became a member of the US national championship team. While at Arizona State, Hayden scored a 9.8 score on final routines on the horizontal bar. The scores allowed Arizona State to beat favorite Nebraska. Hayden left college two years early to train for the 1988 Summer Olympics.

=== Senior Elite career ===
A member of the Senior National Team for five years, Hayden won the silver in the all-around at U.S. Nationals in 1986. He was named to the 1986 Goodwill Games team.

In late 1987, Hayden suffered a severe foot injury but continued training. His showing at US Nationals was good enough to promote him to the 1988 Olympic Trials. The night before the final day of Trials, Hayden was in sixth place, the last spot on the Olympic Team. However, that day he fell to 11th and missed the Games.

== Post gymnastics career ==
In 1988, after failing to obtain financial sponsorship, Hayden retired from competitive gymnastics.

Hayden worked as a gymnastics coach for several years after leaving competition. He and his brother co-own a gym in Augusta, Georgia.
