= A Special Sesame Street Christmas =

1978 Christmas television special

A Special Sesame Street Christmas is a 1978 CBS Christmas special, made the same year as the better-known Christmas Eve on Sesame Street. The special was first broadcast on Friday, December 8, 1978, at 8 PM ET on CBS, pre-empting Wonder Woman that week, starring Leslie Uggams.

The special features only three of the Sesame Street Muppets: Oscar the Grouch, Big Bird, and Barkley the dog. Barkley is played by gymnast Toby Towson. The puppet used for the special was different from the one used for the series, making him five feet tall, or higher, at times in the special. Mr. Hooper, David, Bob, and Maria are the only humans from the regular cast to make appearances, while most of the regulars are replaced by a large, somewhat all-star cast.

The special features many plot elements that are very loosely tied together, the most important being Oscar as the "Ebenezer Scrooge" on Sesame Street, as a minor takeoff on Charles Dickens' 1843 novella A Christmas Carol. They include Leslie Uggams thinking lemonade was hot chocolate, singer Anne Murray and a magic eggnog container, Oscar adopting a kitten with a broken leg, and Ethel Merman calling Imogene Coca an idiot. Also appearing are Dick Smothers (only one half of the Smothers Brothers was hired for the special), Henry Fonda and Michael Jackson of The Jacksons.

The special was mainly produced for CBS not by the Children's Television Workshop (now Sesame Workshop), but by Bob Banner Associates, notable for Perry Como's Christmas specials. The producers paid CTW for the use of the set, some of the adult characters, Big Bird and Oscar the Grouch, with everything else, including the script and the Barkley costume, provided by Banner staffers.

This program was nominated in the 31st Primetime Emmy Awards (1979) under the category of Outstanding Children's Program, losing to Christmas Eve on Sesame Street. Both specials are now available on DVD.

== See also ==
- List of Christmas films
