= Tyler Mizoguchi =

American artistic gymnast

- Full name: Tyler Hideo Mizoguchi
- Born: November 14, 1989 (age 36)
- Height: 5 ft 2 in (157 cm)

Gymnastics career
- Discipline: Men's artistic gymnastics
- Country represented: United States; (2010–2012)
- College team: Illinois Fighting Illini
- Gym: Houston Gymnastics Academy
- Former coaches: Ivan Ivankov, Justin Spring, Kevin Mazeika
- Retired: c. 2012
Medal record
Men's artistic gymnastics
Representing United States
Event	1st	2nd	3rd
Pan American Games	0	0	1
Total	0	0	1
Pan American Games
Bronze medal – third place	2011 Guadalajara	Team

Tyler Hideo Mizoguchi (born November 14, 1989) is a retired American artistic gymnast. He was a member of the United States men's national artistic gymnastics team and won a bronze for the United States at the 2011 Pan American Games.

== Early life and education ==
Mizoguchi was born on November 14, 1989, to Hideo and Kellie Mizoguchi. He was raised in Houston, Texas, and participated in both gymnastics and track and field. He trained at Houston Gymnastics Academy with Kevin Mazeika while attending James E. Taylor High School. He later attended the University of Illinois Urbana-Champaign to pursue gymnastics.

== Gymnastics career ==
=== College ===
In his first year of college competition in 2009, Mizoguchi competed in the parallel bars, pommel horse, floor exercise, and in the all-around. He scored 15.15 in parallel bars and placed first that year at the Big Ten Championships. He finished in sixth place on the floor exercise at the Big Ten individual event finals with a score of 14.725. In the pommel horse event, he scored 14.650, and in the all-around 84.800 against Penn State.

In his sophomore year, he earned his first All-American honors with a sixth-place finish in the all-around. Mizoguchi placed well enough in the 2010 winter cup to make the United States Senior National team. Throughout the 2010–2011 season he gained a career-high seven individual titles while helping the University of Illinois gymnastics team along with other athletes such as Daniel Ribeiro, Justin Spring and Yoshi Mori.

In his junior season, he helped the University of Illinois win the Big Ten Championships for a third straight time.

It was announced Mizoguchi was removed from the team in March 2012.

=== International ===
Mizoguchi won a bronze medal at the 2011 Pan American Games team all-around.

== Personal life ==
Mizoguchi worked at his parents' gym, Fun and Fitness Gymnastics, in Richmond, Texas.
