= Ronald Barak =

American gymnast (born 1943)

- Full name: Ronald S. Barak
- Born: June 7, 1943 (age 83) Los Angeles, California, U.S.
- Height: 5 ft 7 in (170 cm)
- Relatives: Ehud Barak (second cousin)

Gymnastics career
- Discipline: Men's artistic gymnastics
- Country represented: United States
- College team: USC Trojans (1961–1964)
- Club: Los Angeles Turners; Alexander Hamilton High School
- Head coach: Jack Beckner
- Retired: c. 1965

Ronald S. Barak (born June 7, 1943) is an American gymnast. At the 1961 Maccabiah Games he won eight gold medals, one silver medal, and one bronze medal. At the 1964 NCAA Men's Gymnastics Championships he won the all-around competition, the horizontal bars, and the parallel bars, and at the 1964 Amateur Athletic Union (AAU) National Gymnastics Competition he was the champion in the horizontal bars. He was a member of the United States men's national artistic gymnastics team and competed in eight events at the 1964 Summer Olympics.

== Early life and education ==
Barak was born in Los Angeles, California, and is Jewish. He attended Louis Pasteur Junior High School in West Los Angeles, and Alexander Hamilton High School in Los Angeles.

He then attended the University of Southern California (USC; B.S. with honors in physics, '64), and was awarded USC's Athlete of the Year Award in 1964. Barak also attended the University of Southern California Law School (J.D., '68).

== Gymnastics career ==
In 1960 Barak was the LA City Schools horizontal bar champion.

Barak competed for the US in gymnastics at the 1961 Maccabiah Games, winning eight gold medals (including two in the rings, and two in the horizontal bar), one silver medal, and one bronze medal.

In 1962, Barak led the USC Trojans to a National Collegiate Athletic Association (NCAA) title in gymnastics, and won the all-around in the Big 6 Conference. He sat out 1963 with injuries.

At the 1964 NCAA Men's Gymnastics Championships, Barak won three individual titles—the all-around competition, the horizontal bars, and the parallel bars. At the 1964 Amateur Athletic Union (AAU) National Gymnastics Competition, he was the champion in the horizontal bars. He was named a National Association of Gymnastics Coaches First Team All-American in the all-around, horizontal bar, and parallel bars.

Barak was a member of the United States men's national gymnastics team that placed seventh in the team combined exercise competition at the 1964 Tokyo Olympics. He was 25th in the rings, 31st in the horizontal bars, 39th in the all-around competition out of 130 competitors, 45th in the parallel bars, 54th in the floor exercise, 67th in the pommel horse, and 95th in the vault.

From 1965 to 1968, while attending law school he was head coach of the USC Trojans varsity gymnastics team. In 1967 Barak was the coach of the United States gymnastics team that won a silver medal in the 1967 World University Games.

== Post-gymnastics career ==
Barak became a partner at Paul, Hastings, Janofsky & Walker where he became chairman of the real estate section of and co-managing partner. He was later a partner at the law firm of Manatt, Phelps & Phillips.

He authored the mystery novel A Season For Redemption (2010), and a novel, The Amendment Killer, a political thriller published in November 2017.

== Legacy and honors ==
In 1990, Barak was inducted into the Southern California Jewish Sports Hall of Fame. In 1995 he was inducted into the U.S. Gymnastics Hall of Fame. In 2017 he was inducted into the Los Angeles City Schools Hall of Fame.

== Personal life ==
He lives in Pacific Palisades, California. His second cousin, Ehud Barak, was the 10th Prime Minister of Israel.
