= Bob Stout =

American gymnast

- Full name: Robert Harris Stout
- Born: November 9, 1925 Philadelphia, Pennsylvania, U.S.
- Died: July 15, 1981 (aged 55) Abington, Pennsylvania, U.S.

Gymnastics career
- Discipline: Men's artistic gymnastics
- Country represented: United States
- College team: Temple Owls
- Gym: Philadelphia Turners
Medal record
Representing Temple Owls
Event	1st	2nd	3rd
NCAA Championships	1	0	0
Total	1	0	0
NCAA Championships
Gold medal – first place	1949 Berkeley	Horizontal bar

Robert Harris Stout (November 9, 1925 – July 15, 1981) was an American gymnast. He was a member of the United States men's national artistic gymnastics team and competed in eight events at the 1952 Summer Olympics.

== Career ==
Representing Northeast High School, Stout was Philadelphia Public League champion in 1942 and 1943.

Stout was an intercollegiate champion at Temple University. As a member of the Philadelphia Turners, Stout missed out on qualification to the 1948 Summer Olympics but qualified for the 1952 games with a first-place finish at a national gymnastics championship.

Stout later became a teacher in Philadelphia and judged gymnastics events.
