= Makoto Sakamoto =

American artistic gymnast and coach

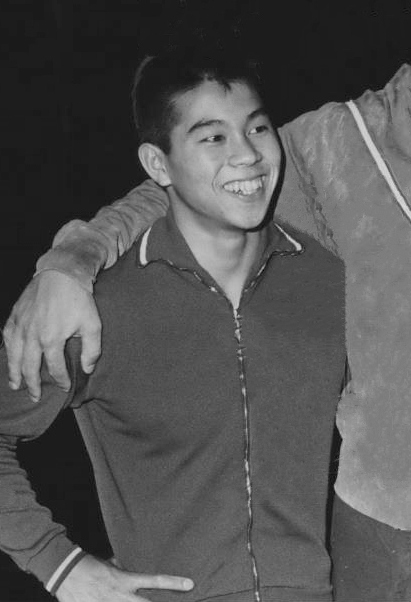
- Sakamoto in 1965

Personal information
- Full name: Makoto Douglas Sakamoto
- Born: April 8, 1947 Shinjuku, Tokyo, Japan
- Height: 167 cm (5 ft 6 in)

Gymnastics career
- Discipline: Men's artistic gymnastics
- Country represented: United States
- College team: USC Trojans

Makoto Douglas Sakamoto (born April 8, 1947) is a retired American artistic gymnast and coach. He was a member of the United States men's national artistic gymnastics team. He competed at the 1964 and 1972 Summer Olympics with the best individual result of 17th place on parallel bars in 1972. Domestically he won the AAU titles in the all-around and horizontal bar in 1963, in the all-around in 1964, and all seven events in 1965.

Sakamoto was born in 1947 in Shinjuku, Tokyo, Japan, and in 1955 his family moved to California, U.S. After receiving B.A. and M.A. degrees in coaching he worked as an assistant coach at UCLA in 1976–1984. His trainees included Peter Vidmar and Tim Daggett. After that, he worked for the New South Wales Gymnastics Association in Sydney, Australia from 1984 to 1987, and between 1987 and 2000 he was head coach at Brigham Young University. Sakamoto was an assistant coach for the American teams that competed at the 1984 Summer Olympics and 1981 and 1983 world championships. He is married to Masako Yoshisa and has two children. In 1986 he was inducted into the U.S. Gymnastics Hall of Fame.
