= Armando Vega =

American gymnast (1935–2026)

- Full name: Jose Armando Vega
- Born: October 24, 1935 Hurley, New Mexico, U.S.
- Died: September 28, 2026 (aged 90) Dallas, Texas, U.S.
- Height: 167 cm (5 ft 6 in)

Gymnastics career
- Discipline: Men's artistic gymnastics
- Country represented: United States
- College team: Penn State Nittany Lions (1956–57, 1959)
- Gym: Los Angeles Turners

Jose Armando Vega (October 24, 1935 – September 28, 2026) was an American gymnast and coach. He was a member of the United States men's national artistic gymnastics team and competed in eight events at the 1956 Summer Olympics.

== Biography ==
Vega attended Pennsylvania State University and was a member of the Penn State Nittany Lions men's gymnastics team from 1956 through 1959, however did not participate in the 1958 season as he was on a gymnastics tour of Europe and was gone for the semester. He won multiple NCAA Championships and was named captain of the Penn State team for his final season in 1959.

Later, Vega was a member of Los Angeles Turners.

Vega died in Dallas, Texas, on September 28, 2026, at the age of 90.
