= Luke Stannard =

American gymnast

Robert Luke Stannard is an American gymnast. He competed for Illinois from 2007 to 2010. In 2009, he won the gold medal on pommel horse at the National championships. In 2010, he placed fourth at NCAA championships on pommel horse and thus earned all-American honors. That year, he was awarded the Nissen-Emery, the gymnastics version of the Heisman.

After college, Stannard continued training at Illinois for another year, working as an assistant for Justin Spring. He later moved to the US Olympic Training Center, but back injuries hampered him and he eventually quit the sport. After a nine-month layoff, he decided to try again. He returned to Illinois to train. A finger ligament injury affected him at the 2013 Winter Cup meet and he did not make the National Team. As of February 2013, he was uncertain if he would continue in gymnastics.

Stannard is unusually tall for a gymnast. His long, thin body type (6–1, 170#) is suited for pommel horse, which is his best event. However, his favorite event is floor exercise.
