= Stanley Tarshis =

American artistic gymnast (1937–2022)

- Full name: Stanley Gordon Tarshis
- Born: November 15, 1937 Los Angeles, California, U.S.
- Died: October 6, 2022 (aged 84) Los Angeles, California, U.S.
- Height: 5 ft 11 in (180 cm)

Gymnastics career
- Discipline: Men's artistic gymnastics
- College team: Michigan State Spartans
- Retired: c. 1964

Stanley Gordon Tarshis (November 15, 1937 – October 6, 2022) was an American artistic gymnast. He was the NCAA horizontal bar champion in 1959 and 1960. In 1958, he came in second place to Abie Grossfeld preventing him from becoming the only three-time horizontal bar champion in NCAA history. Tarshis was also awarded the “Big Ten Medal of Honor” in 1960 in his final year at Michigan State University.

== Death ==
Stan (who had changed his last name to Gordon) died from complications of a fall due to Parkinson's disease.
