= Dan Hayden =

American artistic gymnast

- Full name: Daniel Hayden
- Born: 1965 (age 60–61) Buffalo, New York, U.S.

Gymnastics career
- Discipline: Men's artistic gymnastics
- Country represented: United States
- College team: Arizona State Sun Devils
- Eponymous skills: Hayden (horizontal bar)

Daniel Hayden (born 1965 in Buffalo, New York) is a retired American gymnast. Hayden was a United States men's national artistic gymnastics team member and appeared at the 1985 and 1987 World Championships. He was a US national champion. Hayden competed for Arizona State University and was a collegiate national champion. In 1988, he was second at the Olympic Trials during the first day of competition but fell to eighth on the second day when he twice missed a Kovacs release on the horizontal bar. He was not selected for the team but was named as an alternate.

Hayden's twin brother, Dennis, was also an elite gymnast. The two own a gymnastics facility in Augusta, Georgia. Both brothers were star junior athletes and moved away from home to train.

He was inducted into the USA Gymnastics Hall of Fame in 2004.

== Eponymous skills ==
Hayden has one named element on the horizontal bar.

Gymnastics elements named after Dan Hayden
Apparatus	Name	Description	Difficulty (Note: Valid for the 2025–2028 Code of Points)	Added to Code of Points
Horizontal bar	Hayden	"Double salto bwd. str. w. 1/1 t. over the bar."	D, 0.4	1989
