= Toby Towson =

American gymnast and dancer

- Full name: Toby Towson
- Born: Illinois, U.S.
- Spouse: Kathryn Talbott (as of 2010)

Gymnastics career
- Discipline: Artistic gymnastics
- Country represented: United States
- College team: Michigan State University
- Assistant coach: Kelli Hill (U.S. Women's gymnastics)
- Awards: 1968 NCAA Gymnastics Champion (Floor Exercise), 1969 NCAA Gymnastics Champion (Floor Exercise)

Toby Towson is an American gymnast and dancer. He performed as the Sesame Street Muppet dog Barkley in its debut appearance in A Special Sesame Street Christmas and in season 10.

A native of Illinois, Towson has had a career in gymnastics, acrobatics, and dance, and he was the 1968 and 1969 NCAA Gymnastics Champion in the Floor Exercise. He is a graduate of Michigan State University.

As an assistant to U.S. Women's gymnastics coach Kelli Hill, Towson coached Olympic gymnast Dominique Dawes. He has coached nationally with the USA Gymnastics Talent Opportunity Program and is a National Level Judge with USA Gymnastics.

Through a personal friendship with the Henson family, Towson was tapped to model for the building of a new Sesame Street character which would debut for the tenth anniversary season of Sesame Street. At first the costume was going to be an ape-like creature which could do acrobatics, so as a professional gymnast and dancer, Towson was a natural pick. As the costume was created however, the writers decided to make it into a large furry dog whose original name was "Woov-woov", but no one was happy with that name. It was changed to "Barkley" after the first few appearances on the show. Since Towson was comfortable in the costume, and it fit him, Jim offered him a one-year contract to be on call for Children's Television Workshop, and Towson appeared as "Barkley" for several months until Brian Muehl took over.

Towson continued his acrobatic dancing career and directed the Musawwir Gymnastic Dance Company which performed from a home base in Manhattan for ten years, from approximately 1976 to 1986. Towson taught dance for Washington County Public Schools in Hagerstown, Maryland, and coached gymnastics and dance at Rainbow Gymnastics in Waynesboro, Pennsylvania. As of 2010, Towson performs an alphabet dancer assembly show.

As of 2010, Towson lives with his wife, Kathryn Talbott, and three children in Boonsboro, Maryland.
