= Jamie Natalie =

American gymnast (born 1979)

- Full name: Jamie Natalie
- Born: February 22, 1979 (age 47) Wilmington, Delaware, U.S.

Gymnastics career
- Discipline: Men's artistic gymnastics
- Country represented: United States (1997–2001)
- College team: Ohio State Buckeyes
- Gym: Prestige Gymnastics
- Head coach: Miles Avery
- Awards: Nissen-Emery Award (2001)

Jamie Natalie (born February 22, 1979) is a retired American gymnast. He was a highly decorated college gymnast, achieving the 2001 Nissen-Emery Award and a two-time individual all-around national champion. He was a member of the United States men's national artistic gymnastics team and in 2000 the USOC named two lower-ranked gymnasts to the Olympic team and named Jamie the alternate. The USOC's attempt to send a message was widely derided and became the subject of continuing scrutiny. The "backroom" dealings and secretive process that resulted in what was widely considered punitive action, exposed the US Olympic coaches' biases to nationwide embarrassment and shame.

== Early life and education ==
Natalie was born on February 22, 1979 in Wilmington, Delaware and grew up there. Natalie was a club gymnast at Prestige Gymnastics in Lancaster, Pennsylvania.

Natalie was a Junior National team member for two out of three years between 1994 and 1997. In 1994, he won bronze in the all-around at J.O. Nationals. He graduated from Alexis I. duPont High School in 1997.

== Gymnastics career ==
=== College ===
Natalie competed for Ohio State from 1998-2001, under coach Miles Avery. Natalie was a seven-time all-American. In 2000, Natalie was the NCAA champion in the all-around and in floor exercise. In 2001, Ohio State was the team champion, and Natalie repeated his all-around gold. That year, he was awarded the Nissen-Emery Award, the men's gymnastics version of the Heisman.

=== Senior elite career ===
==== Pre-Olympic Trials ====
Natalie was a member of the Senior National team between 1997 and 2001. In 1998, he was named to the 1998 Goodwill Games. In 1999, Natalie won gold on the horizontal bar at the U.S. National Championships; a knee injury hampered him from competing on all events. In 2000, Natalie again placed first on the horizontal bar and finished tied for sixth in the all-around. These results qualified Natalie to the 2000 Olympic Trials.

==== 2000 Olympic Trials and selection controversy ====
Before the meet, Natalie told his coach 'I'm making the team, I'm going after it.' Starting the meet on the horizontal bar, he scored a 9.9, which was the highest scored routine of the meet. After sticking his landing, Natalie stomped off the podium, slapping high fives and walking up and talking to the camera. Next, on floor exercise, Natalie earned a 9.625. He showed a similar emotional reaction, walking up and down, getting congratulations from other gymnasts, and making the outburst "do the math now, baby" in the vicinity of the judges. The NBC commentator said, 'if you like rah rah in your gymnastics, we have your man, Jamie Natalie of Ohio State'. After five events, Natalie was sixth and faced the parallel bars. He scored a 9.625, his best result on that apparatus during the season. This moved him to fifth in the all-around ranks.

2000 was the first year that U.S. selection was not based strictly on the top all-rounders. Only the first four all-rounders (based on a 60-40 average of Trials and U.S. Nationals) were assured spots on the Olympic Team. Blaine Wilson, Paul Hamm, Sean Townsend, and Stephen McCain were the top four. The last two spots were chosen by a committee. They chose Morgan Hamm and John Roethlisberger, who had finished sixth and seventh, respectively; Natalie was named as the alternate.

After the announcement, Natalie and Roethlisberger were stunned. Roethlisberger pulled Natalie aside for a private conversation before the team answered questions. When he emerged, Natalie told the press:

They could just pick the top six guys, but that might not be the best team. You have to put the best team on the floor. I can see where they’re coming from. Morgan is absolutely great on floor and vault. And John is great on the other four events. It’s a no-brainer.

The head of the selection committee and the coach for the 2000 delegation was Peter Kormann, who had been the Ohio State coach until Natalie's freshman year. He said the committee had only considered the value of all gymnasts on different events to help the team, and not the all-around scores after the top four were chosen.

We went with the guys we thought could get the job done. It's not because of brothers like the Hamms or personalities. This was about what was best for the team. This is the team we believe can bring home a medal.

Later after the athletes had met with coach Kormann, Natalie said:

I'm just chilling, No, I don't think the process was flawed. I had my best night and it just wasn't enough. They had the numbers. I'm happy to be the alternate.

Raj Bhavsar, an Ohio State teammate of Natalie's had also competed at the 2000 Trials and said:

I feel for him. Deep down, I always thought he would be one of the guys. I wish he was. He would never have been a wrong choice. He's a great competitor and a great guy.

John Roethlisberger's father and coach, Fred Roethlisberger, commented:

I'm a little sad. I'm not happy with how John did it. I have a lot of empathy for Jamie Natalie. A big part of John's emotion up there was because of how he felt about Jamie. It's not an easy thing to accept for him or for me.

==== Last international competition ====
In November 2000, USA Gymnastics 'called Jamie Natalie twice' to participate in an international tri-meet against Romania and China, the Pontiac International. Ohio state coach Miles Avery (who was also head coach of the meet's U.S. squad) said, before the meet:

This meet is an important step for the U.S. men's team. These championships are leading up to the World Championships next year. It's also a big stepping stone for Jamie Natalie. It will help to set himself up for the next quadrennium and the Olympics in Athens.

In the competition, the United States finished second. Natalie described the competition:

The energy level was great tonight--the crowd was awesome. We came in and hit our routines and did more than we expected tonight. I was really happy with my performance.

== Departure from gymnastics ==
After the 2000 Trials, Natalie was encouraged to continue training and try for the 2004 games. However, he spoke out against trying again, citing a need for more than sports training in his daily life. In addition, he said he did not want to sacrifice four years of his life for an uncertain chance and he mentioned the possibility of injury affecting a comeback.

After his college career finished in the spring of 2001, Natalie stopped training. He entered medical school the next fall. When interviewed shortly before the 2004 Games, Natalie said:

What's the point of working very hard for another four years to potentially not make the team again because of a random decision?

Natalie received a medical degree from The Ohio State University College of Medicine in 2005 and is now a sports medicine physician.

== Legacy ==
Natalie was inducted into the Delaware Sports Hall of Fame in 2010, and that same year he was also inducted into the Ohio State Athletics Hall of Fame.
