= Ron Galimore =

American gymnast (born 1959)

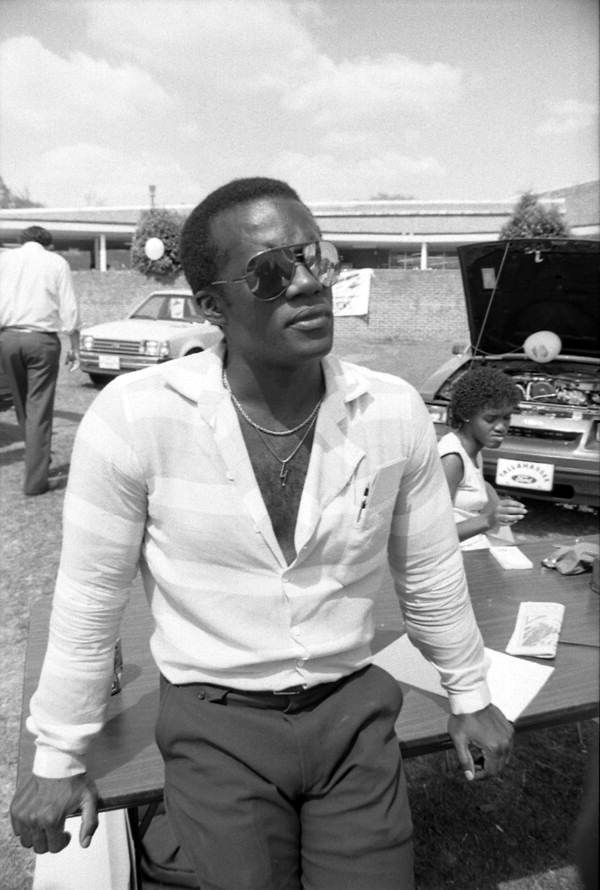
- Gallimore in 1985

Personal information
- Full name: DaVonche Therhon Galimore
- Born: March 7, 1959 (age 67) Chicago, Illinois, U.S.

Gymnastics career
- Country represented: United States
- College team: LSU Tigers; Iowa State Cyclones

DaVonche Therhon "Ron" Galimore (born March 7, 1959) is an American former gymnast.

== Gymnastics ==
He was the United States artistic gymnastics champion in floor exercise in 1977, 1979, and 1980; and in vault in 1977, 1979, 1980, and 1981. He was a member of the United States men's national artistic gymnastics team and qualified for the 1980 U.S. Olympic team, although that team was never sent to Moscow because of a U.S.-led boycott of the 1980 Summer Olympics. He was one of 461 athletes to receive a Congressional Gold Medal years later.

He served as Chief Operating Officer of USA Gymnastics from 2011 until his resignation on November 16, 2018.

== Personal life ==
His father was Willie Galimore, a former National Football League star and College Football Hall of Fame inductee who died in a traffic accident just ahead of the 1964 season.
