= Gene Wettstone =

American gymnastics coach

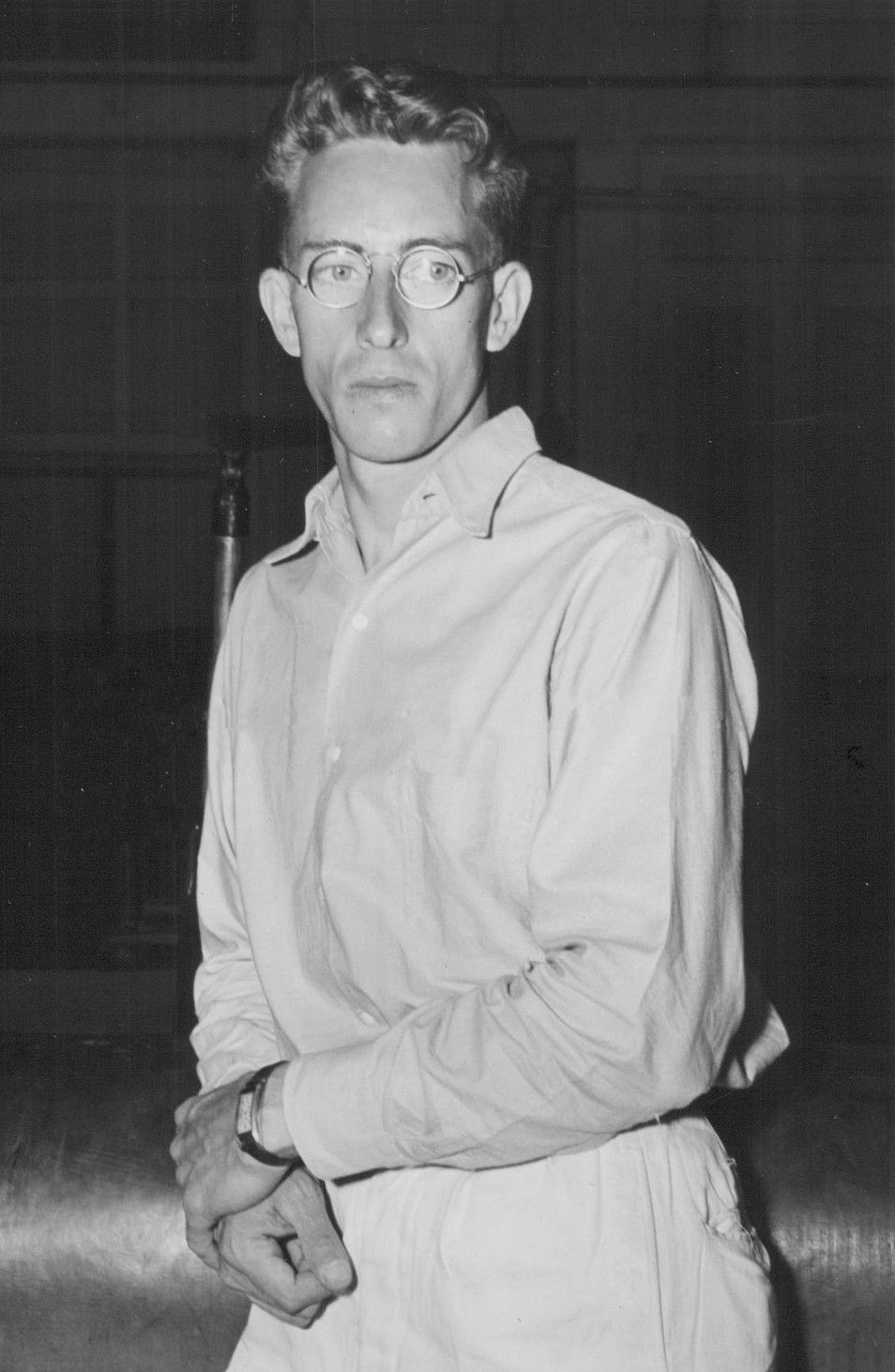
- Wettstone in 1946

Biographical details
- Born: July 15, 1913; West Hoboken, New Jersey
- Died: July 30, 2013 (aged 100); State College, Pennsylvania

Coaching career (HC unless noted)
- 1939–1976: Penn State

Head coaching record
- Overall: –– (–)

Accomplishments and honors

Championships
- 9 National Championships (1948, 1959, 1960, 1961, 1976)

Eugene Wettstone (July 15, 1913 – July 30, 2013), was an American gymnastics coach, known as the "Dean of Collegiate Gymnastics Coaches", for leading Pennsylvania State University to a record nine N.C.A.A. championships in the sport, and for coaching the United States men's teams in the 1948 and 1956 Summer Olympics.

== Early life ==
Eugene "Gene" Wettstone was born July 15, 1913 West Hoboken, New Jersey (what is today Union City, New Jersey).

== Career ==
Wettstone took up gymnastics at a Swiss social club and attended the University of Iowa on a gymnastics scholarship. He won Big Ten titles on the pommel horse and the horizontal bar and in the all-around as a senior in 1937. He graduated with bachelor's and master's degrees in physical education.

Wettstone was the head coach of the men's gymnastics team at Pennsylvania State University from 1939 to 1976. He led the Penn State Nittany Lions gymnasts to nine national championships. He also coached the United States men's gymnastics teams at the 1948 and 1956 Summer Olympics.

Wettstone was inducted into the United States Gymnastics Hall of Fame in 1963.

== Personal life ==
Wettstone married Eleanor Keen in 1937 in Iowa City.

Wettsone died at age 100 in State College, Pennsylvania, in July 2013.
