= Ray Sorensen (gymnast) =

American gymnast

- Full name: Raymond Stephen Sorensen
- Born: May 12, 1922 Warren, Pennsylvania, U.S.
- Died: December 17, 1974 (aged 52)

Gymnastics career
- Discipline: Men's artistic gymnastics
- Country represented: United States
- College team: Penn State Nittany Lions
Medal record
Men's artistic gymnastics
Representing Penn State Nittany Lions
Event	1st	2nd	3rd
NCAA Championships	3	0	0
Total	3	0	0
NCAA Championships
Gold medal – first place	1948 Chicago	Team
Gold medal – first place	1948 Chicago	All-around
Gold medal – first place	1948 Chicago	Parallel bars

Raymond Stephen Sorensen (May 12, 1922 – December 17, 1974) was an American gymnast. He was a member of the United States men's national artistic gymnastics team and competed in eight events at the 1948 Summer Olympics.

Sorensen died in a motorcycle accident on December 17, 1974.
