= Newt Loken =

American gymnast and coach (1919-2011)

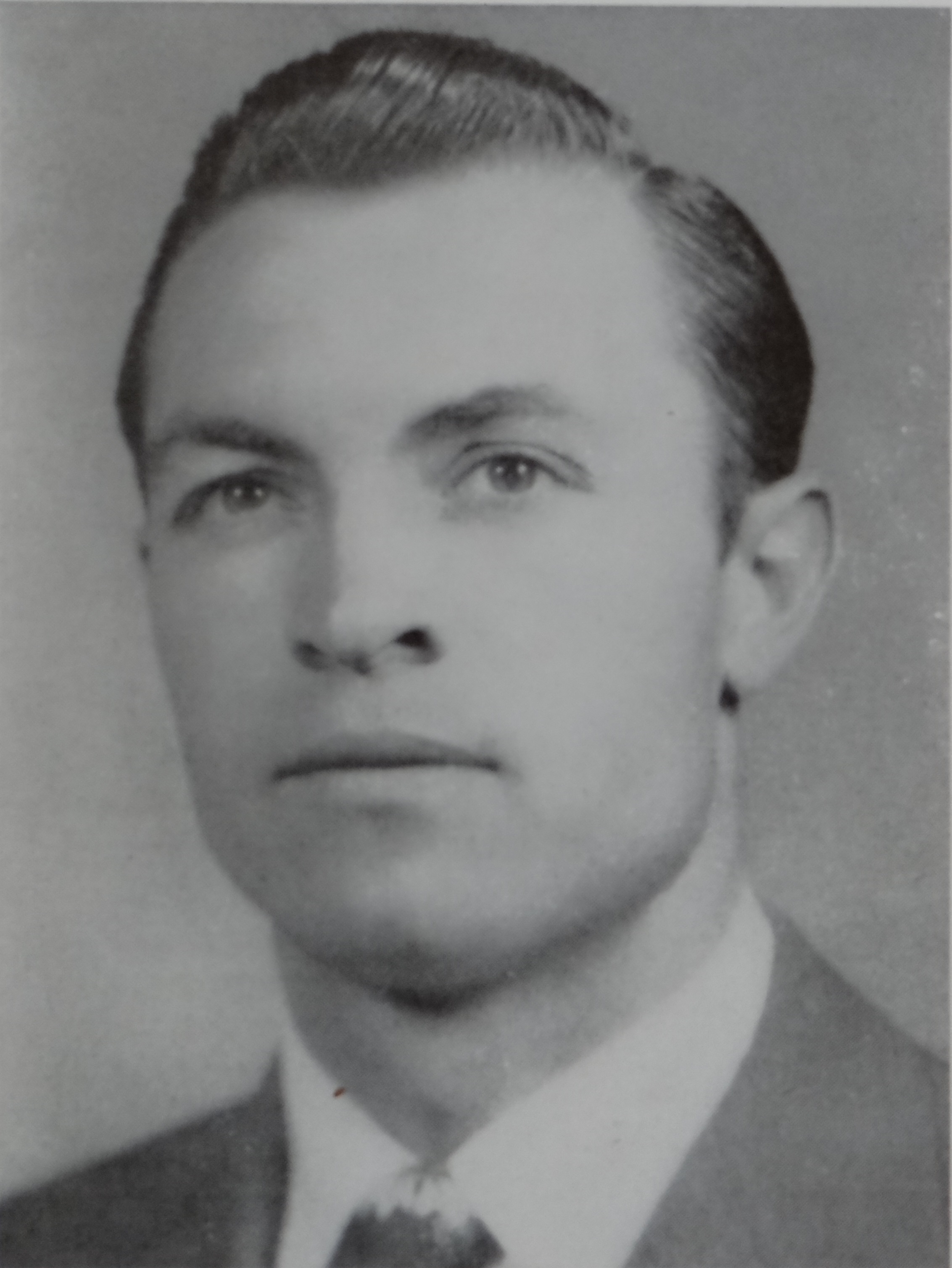
- Loken c. 1948

Personal information
- Full name: Newton Clayton Loken
- Born: February 27, 1919 Breckenridge, Minnesota, US
- Died: June 28, 2011 (aged 92) Eugene, Oregon, US

Gymnastics career
- Discipline: Men's artistic gymnastics

Newton Clayton Loken (February 27, 1919 – June 28, 2011) was an artistic gymnast and coach of gymnastics, trampolining and cheerleading. While a member of the Minnesota Golden Gophers men's gymnastics team, Loken was NCAA all-around gymnastics champion in 1942 and the Big Ten Conference all-around champion in 1941 and 1942. He coached the University of Michigan gymnastics team for 36 years from 1948 to 1983. Loken's gymnasts won the NCAA championships in 1963 and 1970, as well as 12 Big Ten championships. His record as Michigan's gymnastics coach was 250-72-1. Loken also coached the Michigan trampolining team to NCAA championships in 1969 and 1970.

== University of Minnesota ==
Gymnast Newt Loken University of Minnesota

Born in Breckenridge, Minnesota, of Norwegian descent, Loken attended West High School in Minneapolis where he became Minnesota's all-around gymnastics champion in the late 1930s. After high school, he attended the University of Minnesota. Loken was named captain of the Minnesota team coached by Ralph Piper in 1942 and was also named an All-American. He won Big Ten all-around championships in 1941 and 1942. He also won the NCAA all-around championship in 1942. Loken later recalled that Coach Piper was so confident in Loken that he had a trophy engraved for Loken's all-around championship in 1942 two weeks before Loken won the competition. Loken also won the NCAA individual championship in the horizontal bar in 1941 and Big Ten championships in the parallel bars (1941) and the flying rings (1942). Loken was also an All-American cheerleader and captain of the Minnesota cheerleading squad. Life magazine published an article featuring Loken on May 18, 1942, titled, "All-around Gym Champion: Newt Loken is a Combination Strong Man and Acrobat."

== World War II ==
During World War II, Loken served in the U.S. Navy. He taught physical conditioning to the Naval aviators in the pre-flight school in Iowa City, Iowa, and co-authored the Navy's book Gymnastics and Tumbling. He later served on the aircraft carrier USS Prince William. From 1943 to 1944, the Prince William operated between the west coast and such places as New Caledonia, Canton Island, Samoa and Espiritu Santo. As an athletic welfare officer in the Navy, he conducted a conditioning program to keep the men on the ship in good physical shape; Loken used a trampoline as part of the program.

== University of Michigan ==
Loken came to the University of Michigan in 1944 as a master's degree student. On the side, he coached the cheerleading team. At the time of Loken's arrival, Michigan did not have a men's gymnastics program, which had been dropped several years earlier during the Great Depression. In 1946, Loken received his master's degree and sought to resurrect men's gymnastics as a varsity sport at Michigan. In 1947, the athletic board awarded varsity status to men's gymnastics. Loken, who had been leading a group of club gymnasts on the road performing at the halftime of basketball games, was named the coach of the new men's gymnastics team.

Loken remained the coach of Michigan's men's gymnastics team for 36 years and compiled a record of 250-72-1. His teams won NCAA men's gymnastics championships in 1963 and 1970 and 12 Big Ten championships. Loken coached 71 Big Ten individual event winners and 21 NCAA individual event winners.

Loken received a doctorate in education in 1955 and was a kinesiology professor at Michigan until 1983.

Loken also coached the cheerleading team at Michigan as well as the varsity sport of trampoline. From 1947 through 1964, trampoline was included as an event in gymnastics competitions by both the AAU and NCAA. The first trampoline world championships were held in 1964, and trampoline was first recognized as a sport in its own right in the United States in 1967. Loken led the Michigan trampoline team to NCAA championships in 1969 and 1970. Loken produced more trampoline champions and World Medal winners than any other collegiate coach.

Loken was also the author of several books on gymnastics, tumbling, and cheerleading. Among other works, Loken wrote Cheerleading, published by The Ronald Press in 1945, Gymnastics, published by Sterling Publishing Co. in 1966, and the Complete Book of Gymnastics, published by The Athletic Institute in 1963.

Loken also led Michigan's efforts as host of the 1971 NCAA championship attended by a record 25,000 fans. The final day's events alone were attended by a record crowd of 16,781, and Loken was presented the American Association of Gymnastics Coaches' "Coach of the Year" award after the event.

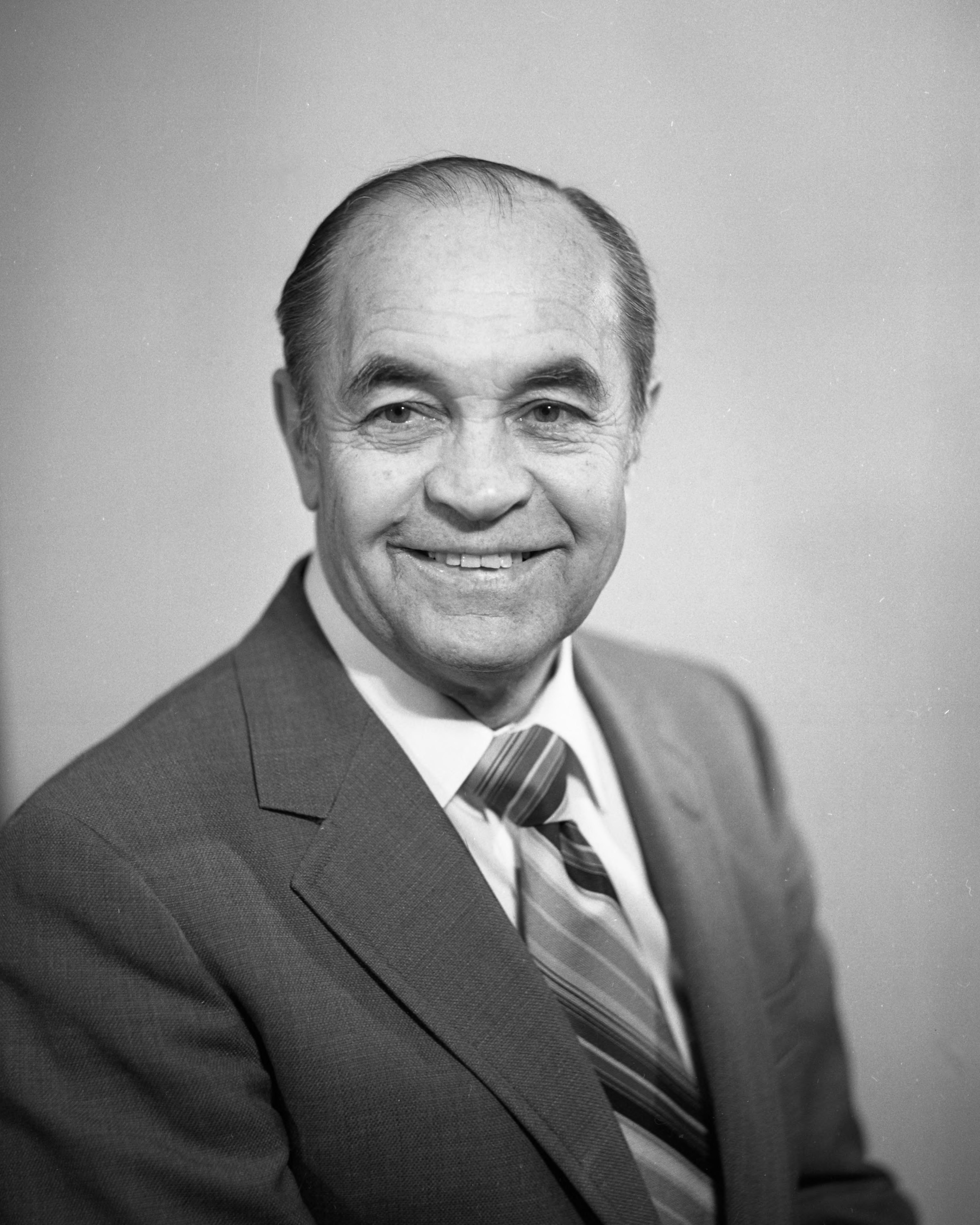
Loken in 1981

Trampolinist Ron Munn said that he accepted Loken’s invitation to attend Michigan because of his personality and coaching record. Munn credited Loken’s positive attitude and coaching ability with helping members of the team improve their performances.[11]

As of 2007, the 88-year-old Loken was still a regular at Michigan's men's gymnastics practices and events. It was reported that he had not missed a Michigan home meet from 1948 to 2007. Rich Dopp, a Michigan gymnast from the 1990s, recalled that Loken was still on the field with the alumni cheerleaders at the Homecoming games as recently as 2001 or 2002. Dopp said, “It may sound a little dorky, but it just makes me want to go, 'Meechigan! Meechigan! Rah, rah!' " In 2007, assistant coach Scott Vetere said: “He knows everybody on the team, and if he forgets, he's 80-some years old, and he'll ask again. He's just a pure gymnastics guy - always wants to be around gymnastics, always wants to learn more, (always) wants to praise guys for what a wonderful job they're doing."

== Awards and honors ==
Loken has received numerous awards, honors, and accolades for his lifetime of service to gymnastics and the University of Michigan. These include:

- In 1963 and again in 1971, Loken was named Collegiate Gymnastics Association National Coach of the Year.
- In 1968, Loken was given the Richard Aronson Special Service Award.
- In 1971, Loken was inducted into the U.S. Gymnastics Association Hall of Fame.
- In 1975, Loken received the Collegiate Gymnastics Association Honor Coach Award.
- Loken has served on the Board of Directors of the National Association of Collegiate Gymnastics Coaches and held titles as President, Vice President, and Secretary-Treasurer at various times.
- Loken was inducted into the University of Michigan Athletic Hall of Honor in 1981 as part of the fourth induction class.
- When he retired in 1983, Loken was honored by the Michigan Marching Band before 100,000 football fans at Michigan Stadium spelled "NEWT" on the field.
- He has been inducted into the University of Minnesota Athletic Sports Hall of Fame.
- In 2003, the men's gymnastics training site at the University of Michigan was renamed the Newt Loken Gymnastics Training Center. The building, formerly known as the Weinberg Coliseum, was built in 1913 and was originally an ice rink.
- The award for best performance of the night on either team, presented at each men's gymnastics home meet, is named after Loken.
- Because of World War II, no Olympic games were held between 1936 and 1948. Loken was part of the generation of athletes that lost the opportunity to compete in the Olympics as a result of the war. In 2002, National Collegiate Gymnastics Alumni Association magazine asked a group of Olympians and Hall of Famers to name an honorary U.S. 1944 Summer Olympics Team, and Loken made the honorary team – 58 years after the fact.

Loken and his wife, Dorothy, had four children, daughters Christine and Lani, and sons Jon and Newt.

== See also ==
- University of Michigan Athletic Hall of Honor
