= Daniel Ribeiro (gymnast) =

American artistic gymnast

- Full name: Daniel Joseph Ribeiro
- Born: July 13, 1989 (age 37)
- Height: 5 ft 8 in (173 cm)

Gymnastics career
- Discipline: Men's artistic gymnastics
- College team: Illinois Fighting Illini
- Gym: US Gymnastics Development Center II
- Head coach: Justin Spring
- Former coaches: Yoshi Hayasaki, Genadi Shub

Daniel Joseph Ribeiro (born July 13, 1989) is an American former artistic gymnast and current collegiate men's gymnastics coach. He is the Illinois Fighting Illini men's gymnastics team head coach. He was the 2010 United States national champion on pommel horse.

== Early life and education ==
Ribeiro was born on July 13, 1989, to Michele and João Luiz Ribeiro. His father was an artistic gymnast and represented Brazil at the 1980 Summer Olympics. Ribeiro's hometown was Chestnut Ridge, New York, and he practiced gymnastics under Genadi Shub at US Gymnastics Development Center II, owned by his parents, in nearby Mahwah, New Jersey. He attended Northern Highlands Regional High School and later enrolled at the University of Illinois Urbana-Champaign to pursue gymnastics.

== Gymnastics career ==
Ribeiro was a member of the Illinois Fighting Illini men's gymnastics team from 2008 to 2011 under head coach Yoshi Hayasaki and then later Justin Spring. Spring, himself a former Illinois Fighting Illini gymnast and 2008 Summer Olympics bronze medalist, was a mentor to Ribeiro. While at Illinois, he was the two-time NCAA champion on the pommel horse (2009, 2011) and was the 2010 United States national champion on the pommel horse.

== Coaching career ==
Ribeiro was named the permanent head coach of Illinois in December 2022 by athletic director Josh Whitman with a contract through the 2026–2027 season.
