= Illinois Fighting Illini men's gymnastics =

Men's gymnastics team of the University of Illinois

- Founded: 1898
- University: University of Illinois Urbana–Champaign
- Head coach: Daniel Ribeiro (2nd season)
- Conference: Big Ten
- Location: Champaign, Illinois
- Home arena: Huff Hall (Capacity: 3,800)
- Nickname: Fighting Illini
- Colors: Orange and blue

National championships
- 1939, 1940, 1941, 1942, 1950, 1955, 1956, 1958, 1989, 2012

NCAA Tournament appearances
- 1938, 1939, 1940, 1941, 1942, 1948, 1949, 1950, 1951, 1952, 1953, 1954, 1955, 1956, 1957, 1958, 1959, 1960, 1961, 1962, 1963, 1981, 1984, 1988, 1989, 1993, 1998, 2000, 2001, 2002, 2003, 2004, 2005, 2006, 2007, 2008, 2009, 2010, 2011, 2012, 2013, 2014, 2015, 2016, 2017, 2018, 2019, 2021, 2022, 2023, 2024, 2025

Conference championships
- 1935, 1939, 1941, 1942, 1950, 1951, 1952, 1953, 1954, 1955, 1956, 1957, 1958, 1959, 1960, 1981, 1983, 1988, 1989, 2004, 2009, 2010, 2011, 2012, 2018

The Illinois Fighting Illini men's gymnastics team represents the University of Illinois Urbana–Champaign and competes in the Big Ten Conference. The Fighting Illini have been invited to 47 NCAA tournaments and have won 10 team NCAA championships, which is second most all-time only to Penn State Nittany Lions' 12 team titles. Additionally, the Fighting Illini have won an all-time record 53 individual NCAA titles.

The Illini hold their competitions at George Huff Hall on the Champaign side of campus, and the team trains and holds practices at the Kenney Gym on the Urbana side of campus.

== History ==
=== Coaching history ===
Illinois Coaches since 1930
Coach	Years	Record	Conference record	Conference titles	NCAA titles
Hartley Price	1930–1948*	150–41*	62–31*	4	4
Charlie Pond	1949–1973	319–152–1	116–59	11	4
Yoshi Hayasaki	1974–1993; 1996–2009	762–444–2	132–80	6	1
Don Osborne	1994–1996	47–58	7–9		
Justin Spring	2010–2022	87–23–1	29–11–1	3	1
Daniel Ribeiro	2022–present	10-4	2-2		
Totals		1,365–728–4	378–239–1	24	10

- No competition from 1943 to 1946 due to World War II.

=== All-time record against current NCAA teams ===
Opponent	Won	Lost	Tied	Percentage
Air Force	11	1	0	.917
Army	12	0	0	1.000
California	16	15	0	.516
Illinois-Chicago	63	16	0	.797
Iowa	139	78	0	.641
Michigan	116	79	1	.594
Minnesota	143	91	0	.611
Navy	5	0	0	1.000
Nebraska	28	23	0	.549
Ohio State	97	71	1	.577
Oklahoma	8	35	0	.186
Penn State	30	50	0	.375
Stanford	15	17	0	.469
Temple	19	2	0	.905
William & Mary	3	0	0	1.000
Totals	705	478	2	.596

== Players ==
=== NCAA individual event champions ===
Illinois has had gymnasts win a record 54 NCAA individual championships.

- 1938: Joseph Giallombardo – All-Around
- 1938: Joseph Giallombardo – Tumbling
- 1938: Joseph Giallombardo – Flying Rings
- 1939: Joseph Giallombardo – All-Around
- 1939: Joseph Giallombardo – Tumbling
- 1939: Marvin Forman – Long Horse
- 1940: Paul Fina – All-Around
- 1940: Harry Koehnemann – Side Horse
- 1940: Joseph Giallombardo – Tumbling
- 1940: Joseph Giallombardo – All-Around
- 1941: Caton Cobb – Side Horse
- 1941: Caton Cobb – Parallel Bars
- 1941: Jack Adkins – Tumbling
- 1942: Caton Cobb – Side Horse
- 1948: Gay Hughes – Trampoline
- 1948: Joe Calvetti – High Bar
- 1950: Irving Bedard – Tumbling
- 1952: Frank Bare – Side Horse
- 1952: Bob Sullivan – Tumbling
- 1953: Bob Sullivan – Floor Exercise
- 1954: Dick Browning – Tumbling
- 1956: Don Tonry – All-Around
- 1956: Dan Lirot – Tumbling
- 1957: Frank Hailand – Tumbling
- 1957: Abie Grossfeld – High Bar
- 1957: John Davis – Side Horse
- 1958: Abie Grossfeld – High Bar
- 1958: Abie Grossfeld – All-Around
- 1958: Abie Grossfeld – Floor Exercise
- 1958: Frank Hailand – Tumbling
- 1959: Don Tonry – Floor Exercise
- 1960: Alvin Barasch – Tumbling
- 1960: Ray Hadley – Floor Exercise
- 1962: Mike Aufrecht – Side Horse
- 1963: Hal Holmes – Tumbling
- 1969: John McCarthy – Long Horse
- 1980: Dave Stoldt – Pommel Horse
- 1984: Charles Lakes – High Bar
- 1998: Travis Romagnoli – All-Around
- 1998: Travis Romagnoli – Vault
- 2004: Bob Rogers – Pommel Horse
- 2004: Justin Spring – High Bar
- 2005: Justin Spring – Parallel Bars
- 2006: Justin Spring – Parallel Bars
- 2006: Justin Spring – High Bar
- 2008: Paul Ruggeri – High Bar
- 2009: Paul Ruggeri – High Bar, Parallel Bars
- 2009: Daniel Ribeiro – Pommel Horse
- 2011: Tyler Mizoguchi – Parallel Bars
- 2011: Daniel Ribeiro – Pommel Horse
- 2012: C. J. Maestas – Still Rings
- 2012: Paul Ruggeri – Vault
- 2013: Fred Hartville – Vault
- 2014: Jordan Valdez – High Bar
- 2015: C. J. Maestas – High Bar
- 2016: Brandon Ngai – Pommel Horse
- 2018: Alex Diab - Still Rings
- 2019: Alex Diab - Still Rings
- 2021: Ian Skirkey - Pommel Horse
- 2026: Brandon Dang - Pommel Horse

=== Nissen Emery Award ===
The Nissen-Emery Award is annually awarded to the best overall male senior collegiate gymnast in the United States. The award recipient must not only excel athletically as a gymnast, but also must display outstanding sportsmanship and scholarship throughout his college career. The award was created in 1966 and is men's gymnastics' equivalent to college football's Heisman Trophy.

- 1989: David Zeddies
- 2006: Justin Spring
- 2010: Luke Stannard
- 2012: Paul Ruggeri

Nissen Emery Finalists

- 1980: Butch Zunich
- 1981: Steve Lechner
- 1986: Joe Ledvora
- 1988: Tigran Mkchyan
- 1989: David Zeddies
- 1993: Ricardo Cheriel
- 1995: Brian Kobylinski
- 1998: Jon Corbitt
- 1999: Kyle Zak
- 2000: Travis Romagnoli
- 2001: Leo Oka
- 2002: J.G. Ketchen
- 2004: Bob Rogers
- 2005: Ben Newman
- 2006: Justin Spring
- 2008: Wes Haagensen
- 2010: Luke Stannard
- 2011: Daniel Ribeiro
- 2012: Paul Ruggeri
- 2013: Yoshi Mori
- 2016: Logan Bradley
- 2017: Joey Peters
- 2018: Brandon Ngai
- 2019: Alex Diab
- 2020: Michael Paradise
- 2022: Hamish Carter
- 2023: Ian Skirkey

=== Illinois Olympians ===
- 1940 Tokyo: Paul Fina – Olympics cancelled due to World War II
- 1956 Melbourne: Abie Grossfeld
- 1960 Rome: Abie Grossfeld
- 1960 Rome: Don Tonry
- 1988 Seoul: Dominick Minicucci
- 1988 Seoul: Charles Lakes
- 1992 Barcelona: Dominick Minicucci
- 2008 Beijing: Justin Spring – Bronze Medal-Artistic Team All-Around
- 2020 Tokyo: Alex Diab (Alternate)
- 2020 Tokyo: Tyson Bull (Australia)
