= Minnesota Golden Gophers men's gymnastics =

- Founded: 1938
- University: University of Minnesota
- Head coach: Mike Burns
- Conference: Big Ten Conference
- Home arena: Maturi Pavilion (Capacity: 5,700)
- Colors: Maroon and gold

NCAA Tournament appearances
- 1938, 1939, 1940, 1941, 1942, 1948, 1949, 1950, 1951, 1952, 1953, 1954, 1955, 1956, 1957, 1959, 1960, 1963, 1964, 1976, 1977, 1978, 1979, 1982, 1984, 1987, 1988, 1989, 1990, 1991, 1992, 1993, 2001, 2002, 2003, 2004, 2005, 2006, 2007, 2008, 2009, 2010, 2011, 2012, 2013, 2014, 2015, 2016, 2017, 2018, 2019

Conference championships
- 1903, 1907, 1910, 1925, 1936, 1938, 1940, 1947, 1948, 1949, 1976, 1977, 1978, 1979, 1980, 1982, 1984, 1990, 1991, 1992, 1995

The Minnesota Golden Gophers represented the University of Minnesota, Twin Cities in Division 1 men's gymnastics. They were coached by Head Coach Mike Burns and Assistant Coaches Kostya Kolesnikov and Jordan Valdez. The team's home venue was Maturi Pavilion.

The Gophers won 21 Big Ten Conference titles, most recently in 1995. They were ranked second in the NCAA three times, most recently in 2018. Two Gophers have been men's artistic individual all-around National Champions: Newt Loken in 1942 and John Roethlisberger in 1991, 1992, & 1993.

On September 10, 2020, the University of Minnesota announced that the school would be cutting the men's gymnastics program, in addition to three others - tennis, indoor track and field, and outdoor track and field - so as to stave off budget shortfalls exacerbated by the COVID-19 pandemic.

== See also ==
- Minnesota Golden Gophers women's gymnastics
