= American Cup (gymnastics) =

Gymnastics competition held in the United States

The American Cup is an elite senior level international gymnastics competition that is held in the United States. It was an individual competition from 1976 to 2020 and resumed in 2026 in a mixed team format. It is usually held in February or March of each year.

== History ==
In 2011, it became part of the International Federation of Gymnastics (FIG) Artistic Gymnastics World Cup series. With the exception of 2005 (when the competition was also part of the FIG World Cup series), it has been exclusively an all-around competition. Past champions include Olympic all-around champions Nadia Comăneci, Mary Lou Retton, Vitaly Scherbo, Paul Hamm, Carly Patterson, Nastia Liukin, Gabby Douglas, and Simone Biles.

The most recent individually contested American Cup took place on March 7, 2020, in Milwaukee. After a six year hiatus, the American Cup returned in 2026 as a mixed team event with teams from eight countries. The inaugural mixed team format was won by China.

== Past women's medalists ==
Year	Location	Gold	Silver	Bronze
1976	New York, NY	Nadia Comăneci (ROU)	Kathy Howard (USA)	Elena Davydova (URS)
1977	New York, NY	Kathy Johnson (USA)	Donna Turnbow (USA)	Marta Egervari (HUN); Karen Kelsall (CAN)
1978	New York, NY	Natasha Tereschenko (URS)	Kathy Johnson (USA)	Eva Marečková (TCH)
1979	New York, NY	Stella Zakharova (URS)	Maxi Gnauck (GDR)	Tracee Talavera (USA)
1980	New York, NY	Tracee Talavera (USA)	Emilia Eberle (ROU)	Marcia Frederick (USA)
1981	Fort Worth, TX	Julianne McNamara (USA)	Tracee Talavera (USA); Huang Qun (CHN); Lavinia Agache (ROU)	none awarded
1982	New York, NY	Julianne McNamara (USA); Zoja Grantcharova (BUL)	none awarded	Tracee Talavera (USA)
1983	New York, NY	Mary Lou Retton (USA)	Julianne McNamara (USA)	Alena Dřevjaná (TCH)
1984	New York, NY	Mary Lou Retton (USA)	Laura Cutina (ROU)	Julianne McNamara (USA)
1985	Indianapolis, IN	Mary Lou Retton (USA)	Yu Feng (CHN)	Daniela Silivaș (ROU)
1986	Fairfax, VA	Kristie Phillips (USA)	Boriana Stoyanova (BUL)	Irina Baraksanova (URS)
1987	Fairfax, Va	Kristie Phillips (USA)	Olga Strazheva (URS)	Phoebe Mills (USA)
1988	Fairfax, VA	Phoebe Mills (USA)	Svetlana Baitova (URS)	Chelle Stack (USA)
1989	Fairfax, VA	Brandy Johnson (USA)	Olesya Dudnik (URS)	Henrietta Ónodi (HUN)
1990	Fairfax, VA	Kim Zmeskal (USA)	Natalia Kalinina (URS)	Mari Kosuge (JPN)
1991	Orlando, FL	Betty Okino (USA)	Kim Zmeskal (USA)	Ludmila Stovbchataya (URS)
1992	Orlando, FL	Kim Zmeskal (USA)	Henrietta Ónodi (HUN)	Shannon Miller (USA)
1993	Orlando, FL	Shannon Miller (USA)	Kerri Strug (USA)	Elena Piskun (BLR)
1994	Orlando, FL	Dominique Dawes (USA)	Vasiliki Tsavdaridou (GRE)	Elena Piskun (BLR)
1995	Seattle, WA	Kristy Powell (USA)	Ana Maria Bican (ROU)	Amanda Borden (USA)
1996	Fort Worth, TX	Kerri Strug (USA)	Svetlana Boginskaya (BLR)	Oksana Chusovitina (UZB)
1997	Fort Worth, TX	Elvire Teza (FRA)	Vanessa Atler (USA)	Ji Liya (CHN)
1998	Fort Worth, TX	Viktoria Karpenko (UKR)	Meng Fei (CHN)	Kristen Maloney (USA)
1999	St. Petersburg, FL	Jennie Thompson (USA)	Elena Produnova (RUS)	Vanessa Atler (USA)
2000	Orlando, FL	Elena Produnova (RUS)	Morgan White (USA)	Laura Martinez (ESP)
2001	Orlando, FL	Elena Zamolodchikova (RUS)	Laura Martinez (ESP)	Kristal Uzelac (USA)
2002	Orlando, FL	Tasha Schwikert (USA)	Courtney Kupets (USA)	Verona van de Leur (NED)
2003	Fairfax, VA	Carly Patterson (USA)	Courtney Kupets (USA)	Ashley Postell (USA)
2004	New York, NY	Carly Patterson (USA)	Courtney McCool (USA)	Chellsie Memmel (USA)
2005	Uniondale, NY	VT:Alicia Sacramone (USA); UB:Chellsie Memmel (USA); BB:Zhang Nan (CHN); Nastia Liukin (USA); FX:Patricia Moreno (ESP)	VT:Melanie Sinclair (USA); UB:Liu Juan (CHN); BB: none awarded FX:Alicia Sacramone (USA)	VT:Cheng Fei (CHN); UB:Tania Gener (ESP); BB:Chellsie Memmel (USA); FX:Beth Tweddle (GBR)
2006	Philadelphia, PA	Nastia Liukin (USA)	Shayla Worley (USA)	Aisha Gerber (CAN)
2007	Jacksonville, FL	Shawn Johnson (USA)	Natasha Kelley (USA)	Elsa García (MEX)
2008	New York, NY	Nastia Liukin (USA)	Shawn Johnson (USA)	Samantha Peszek (USA)
2009	Chicago, Il	Jordyn Wieber (USA)	Bridget Sloan (USA)	Kim Bui (GER)
2010	Worcester, MA	Rebecca Bross (USA)	Aly Raisman (USA)	Jessica López (VEN)
2011	Jacksonville, FL	Jordyn Wieber (USA)	Aliya Mustafina (RUS)	Aly Raisman (USA)
2012	New York, NY	Jordyn Wieber (USA)	Aly Raisman (USA)	Larisa Iordache (ROU)
2013	Worcester, MA	Katelyn Ohashi (USA)	Simone Biles (USA)	Victoria Moors (CAN)
2014	Greensboro, NC	Elizabeth Price (USA)	Brenna Dowell (USA)	Giulia Steingruber (SUI)
2015	Arlington, TX	Simone Biles (USA)	MyKayla Skinner (USA)	Erika Fasana (ITA)
2016	Newark, NJ	Gabby Douglas (USA)	Maggie Nichols (USA)	Ellie Black (CAN)
2017	Newark, NJ	Ragan Smith (USA)	Asuka Teramoto (JPN)	Mélanie de Jesus dos Santos (FRA)
2018	Chicago, IL	Morgan Hurd (USA)	Mai Murakami (JPN)	Maile O'Keefe (USA)
2019	Greensboro, NC	Leanne Wong (USA)	Grace McCallum (USA)	Mai Murakami (JPN); Ellie Black (CAN)
2020	Milwaukee, WI	Morgan Hurd (USA)	Kayla DiCello (USA)	Hitomi Hatakeda (JPN)

== Past men's medalists ==
Year	Location	Gold	Silver	Bronze
1976	New York, NY	Bart Conner (USA)	Dănuț Grecu (ROU); Vladimir Markelov (URS)	none awarded
1977	New York, NY	Mitsuo Tsukahara (JPN)	Kurt Thomas (USA)	Toshiaki Nishiki (JPN)
1978	New York, NY	Kurt Thomas (USA)	Roland Brückner (GDR)	Bart Conner (USA)
1979	New York, NY	Kurt Thomas (USA)	Bogdan Makuts (URS)	Junichi Shimizu (JPN)
1980	New York, NY	Kurt Thomas (USA)	Bart Conner (USA)	Stoyan Deltchev (BUL)
1981	Fort Worth, TX	Bart Conner (USA)	Jim Hartung (USA)	Li Yuejiu (CHN)
1982	New York, NY	Bart Conner (USA)	Peter Vidmar (USA)	Alexander Pogorelov (URS)
1983	New York, NY	Peter Vidmar (USA)	Mitch Gaylord (USA)	Hiroyuki Onoda (JPN)
1984	New York, NY	Peter Vidmar (USA)	Jim Hartung (USA)	Yang Yueshan (CHN)
1985	Indianapolis, IN	Tim Daggett (USA)	Tang Yueshan (CHN)	Koji Sotomura (JPN)
1986	Fairfax, VA	Alexei Tikhonkikh (URS)	Brian Ginsberg (USA)	Wang Chongsheng (CHN)
1987	Fairfax, VA	Brian Ginsberg (USA)	Vladimir Gogoladze (URS)	Scott Johnson (USA)
1988	Fairfax, VA	Marius Toba (ROM)	Igor Korobchinsky (URS)	Kevin Davis (USA)
1989	Fairfax, VA	Vitaly Marinitch (URS)	Lance Ringnald (USA)	Patrick Kirksey (USA)
1990	Fairfax, VA	Alexander Kolyvanov (URS)	Lance Ringnald (USA)	Ralf Büchner (GDR)
1991	Orlando, FL	Trent Dimas (USA)	Chris Waller (USA)	Miguel Rubio (ESP)
1992	Orlando, FL	Jarrod Hanks (USA)	Scott Keswick (USA)	Dimitri Karbanenko (CIS)
1993	Orlando, FL	Vitaly Scherbo (BLR)	Lance Ringnald (USA)	Andreas Wecker (GER)
1994	Orlando, FL	Vitaly Scherbo (BLR)	John Roethlisberger (USA)	Oliver Walther (GER)
1995	Seattle, WA	John Roethlisberger (USA)	Dmitri Vasilenko (RUS)	Rustam Sharipov (UKR)
1996	Fort Worth, TX	John Roethlisberger (USA)	Jair Lynch (USA)	Ilia Giorgadze (GEO)
1997	Fort Worth, TX	Blaine Wilson (USA)	Fan Hongbin (CHN)	Valeri Belenki (GER)
1998	Fort Worth, TX	Blaine Wilson (USA)	Alexei Bondarenko (RUS)	Dimitri Karbanenko (FRA)
1999	St. Petersburg, FL	Blaine Wilson (USA)	Jason Gatson (USA)	Yordan Yovchev (BUL)
2000	Orlando, FL	Erick López (CUB)	Alexei Bondarenko (RUS)	John Roethlisberger (USA)
2001	Orlando, FL	Blaine Wilson (USA)	Sean Townsend (USA)	Erick López (CUB)
2002	Orlando, FL	Erick López (CUB)	Paul Hamm (USA)	Hiroyuki Tomita (JPN)
2003	Fairfax, VA	Blaine Wilson (USA)	Brett McClure (USA)	Hiroyuki Tomita (JPN)
2004	New York, NY	Jason Gatson (USA)	Marian Drăgulescu (ROU)	Paul Hamm (USA)
2005	Uniondale, NY	FX:Jeffrey Wammes (NED); PH:Alexander Artemev (USA); SR:Yuri Van Gelder (NED); VT:Jeffrey Wammes (NED); PB:Kazuya Ueda (JPN); HB:Yann Cucherat (FRA)	FX:Alexander Artemev (USA); PH:Hisashi Mizutori (JPN); SR:Yordan Yovchev (BUL); VT:Roel Ramirez (PHI); PB:Luis Vargas (PUR); HB:Hisashi Mizutori (JPN)	FX:Luis Rivera (PUR); PH:Robert Seligman (CRO); SR:Eric La Morte (USA); VT:Luis Rivera (PUR); PB:Manuel Carballo (ESP); HB:Justin Spring (USA)
2006	Philadelphia, PA	Jonathan Horton (USA)	Hisashi Mizutori (JPN)	David Durante (USA)
2007	Jacksonville, FL	Jonathan Horton (USA)	Takuya Nakase (JPN)	Maxim Devyatovskiy (RUS)
2008	New York, NY	Paul Hamm (USA)	Alexander Artemev (USA)	Hisashi Mizutori (JPN)
2009	Chicago, Il	Fabian Hambuechen (GER)	David Sender (USA)	Joey Hagerty (USA)
2010	Worcester, MA	Maxim Devyatovskiy (RUS)	Jonathan Horton (USA)	Chris Brooks (USA)
2011	Jacksonville, FL	Jonathan Horton (USA)	Mykola Kuksenkov (UKR)	Jacob Dalton (USA)
2012	New York, NY	Danell Leyva (USA)	Mykola Kuksenkov (UKR)	Marcel Nguyen (GER)
2013	Worcester, MA	Jake Dalton (USA)	Oleg Verniaiev (UKR)	Marcel Nguyen (GER)
2014	Greensboro, NC	Sam Mikulak (USA)	Shogo Nonomura (JPN)	Daniel Purvis (GBR)
2015	Arlington, TX	Oleg Verniaiev (UKR)	Ryohei Kato (JPN)	Donnell Whittenburg (USA)
2016	Newark, NJ	Ryohei Kato (JPN)	Donnell Whittenburg (USA)	Sun Wei (CHN)
2017	Newark, NJ	Yul Moldauer (USA)	Oleg Verniaiev (UKR)	Akash Modi (USA)
2018	Chicago, Il	Yul Moldauer (USA)	James Hall (GBR)	Petro Pakhniuk (UKR)
2019	Greensboro, NC	Yul Moldauer (USA)	Sam Mikulak (USA)	Ma Yue (CHN)
2020	Milwaukee, WI	Sam Mikulak (USA)	Oleg Verniaiev (UKR)	James Hall (GBR)

== Past mixed team medalists ==
Year	Location	Gold	Silver	Bronze
2026	Henderson, NV	China; Ke Qinqin; Tian Zhuofan; Zhang Qingying; Li Hongyan; Xie Chenyi; Zhang Yangyu	United States; Charleigh Bullock; Claire Pease; Hezly Rivera; Asher Hong; Danila Leykin; Yul Moldauer	Japan; Rina Kishi; Haruka Nakamura; Daiki Hashimoto; Tomoharu Tsunogai
2027	Duluth, GA			

== Sponsorships ==
Since 1978, the American Cup has been sponsored by various companies, and the event is typically named for the sponsoring company. AT&T cancelled its sponsorship of the competition prior to the 2018 event due to the ongoing sex abuse scandal at USA Gymnastics.

Year	Sponsor	Event name
1978–1979	Dial	Dial American Cup
1982–1996	McDonald's	McDonald's American Cup
1997–2004	Visa	Visa American Cup
2005	T.J. Maxx	American Cup
2006–2010	Tyson Foods	Tyson American Cup
2011–2017	AT&T	AT&T American Cup

== Nastia Liukin Cup ==
Since 2010, the American Cup weekend has also seen the inclusion of an event open exclusively to Level 10 Junior Olympic female athletes, the Nastia Liukin Cup, named after Nastia Liukin.

== See also ==
- U.S. Classic
- USA Gymnastics Championships
