= 2024 Asian Women's Artistic Gymnastics Championships =

Gymnastics event in Uzbekistan

2024 Asian Artistic Gymnastics Championships
- Venue: Gymnastics Sport Palace
- Location: Tashkent, Uzbekistan
- Start date: 24 May 2024
- End date: 26 May 2024

The 2024 Asian Women's Artistic Gymnastics Championships was the 11th edition of the Asian Artistic Gymnastics Championships, held in Tashkent, Uzbekistan from 24 to 26 May 2024.

The event served as a qualification event for the 2024 Olympics Games in Paris.

== Participating countries ==
- China
- Chinese Taipei
- Hong Kong
- India
- Kazakhstan
- Malaysia
- North Korea
- Philippines
- Singapore
- South Korea
- Sri Lanka
- Uzbekistan
- Vietnam

== Medal summary ==
Event	Gold	Silver	Bronze
Senior
Team all-around	China; Chen Xinyi; Hu Jiafei; Jin Xiaoxuan; Qin Xinyi; Yang Fanyuwei	North Korea; Chon Jin-a; Jo Kyong-byol; Jon Jang-mi; Kim Son-hyang; Pak Un-jong	Uzbekistan; Lobar Amrillaeva; Dildora Aripova; Odinakhon Robidjonova; Aleksandra Shevchenko
Individual all-around	(China) Hu Jiafei	(China) Qin Xinyi	(Philippines) Emma Malabuyo
Vault	(India) Dipa Karmakar	(North Korea) Kim Son-hyang	(North Korea) Jo Kyong-byol
Uneven bars	(China) Yang Fanyuwei	(North Korea) Jon Jang-mi	(Philippines) Levi Ruivivar
Balance beam	(China) Qin Xinyi	(China) Chen Xinyi	(North Korea) Kim Son-hyang
Floor exercise	(Philippines) Emma Malabuyo	(China) Chen Xinyi	(Kazakhstan) Aida Bauyrzhanova
Junior
Team all-around	China; Chu Yiming; Qin Ziyue; Li Rongjinyi; Qin Xinyi; Chen Feng	Japan; Rinon Muneta; Asumi Morishita; Yuri Okura; Mito Sumikama	South Korea; Hwang Seo-hyun; An So-yun; Lee Sena; Lee Inae
Individual all-around	(Japan) Rinon Muneta	(China) Li Rongjinyi	(Japan) Yuri Okura
Vault	(Japan) Rinon Muneta	(Japan) Mito Sumikama	(China) Chu Yiming
Uneven bars	(Japan) Rinon Muneta	(China) Li Rongjinyi	(Japan) Yuri Okura
Balance beam	(South Korea) Hwang Seo-hyun	(Japan) Mito Sumikama (Singapore) Amanda Yap	None awarded
Floor exercise	(Japan) Yuri Okura	(China) Li Rongjinyi	(Japan) Mito Sumikama

== Medal table ==
=== Overall ===
* Host nation (Uzbekistan)

Rank	Nation	Gold	Silver	Bronze	Total
1	China	5	6	1	12
2	Japan	4	3	3	10
3	Philippines	1	0	2	3
4	South Korea	1	0	1	2
5	India	1	0	0	1
6	North Korea	0	3	2	5
7	Singapore	0	1	0	1
8	Kazakhstan	0	0	1	1
8	Uzbekistan*	0	0	1	1
Totals (9 entries)		12	13	11	36

=== Senior ===
* Host nation (Uzbekistan)

Rank	Nation	Gold	Silver	Bronze	Total
1	China	4	3	0	7
2	Philippines	1	0	2	3
3	India	1	0	0	1
4	North Korea	0	3	2	5
5	Kazakhstan	0	0	1	1
5	Uzbekistan*	0	0	1	1
Totals (6 entries)		6	6	6	18

=== Junior ===
* Host nation (Uzbekistan)

Rank	Nation	Gold	Silver	Bronze	Total
1	Japan	4	3	3	10
2	China	1	3	1	5
3	South Korea	1	0	1	2
4	Singapore	0	1	0	1
Totals (4 entries)		6	7	5	18

== Senior results ==
=== Individual all-around ===
Rank	Gymnast	Vault (gymnastics)	Uneven bars	Balance beam	Floor (gymnastics)	Total
1st place, gold medalist(s)	(China) Hu Jiafei	12.533	13.800	12.500	11.866	50.699
2nd place, silver medalist(s)	(China) Qin Xinyi	11.733	12.133	13.700	13.000	50.566
3rd place, bronze medalist(s)	(Philippines) Emma Malabuyo	13.033	11.466	12.566	13.333	50.398
4	(Kazakhstan) Aida Bauyrzhanova	12.966	11.633	12.700	13.066	50.365
–	(China) Jin Xiaoxuan	13.000	12.100	12.533	12.633	50.266
5	(Chinese Taipei) Liao Yi-chun	13.066	11.400	11.766	13.000	49.232
6	(Philippines) Levi Ruivivar	12.700	12.800	11.166	12.500	49.166
7	(South Korea) Lim Sumin	13.033	11.300	11.800	12.966	49.099

=== Vault ===
Rank	Gymnast	Vault 1				Vault 2				Total
Rank	Gymnast	D Score	E Score	Pen.	Score 1	D Score	E Score	Pen.	Score 2	Total
1st place, gold medalist(s)	(India) Dipa Karmakar	5.2	8.466	–0.1	13.566	5.0	8.666	–0.1	13.566	13.566
2nd place, silver medalist(s)	(North Korea) Kim Son-hyang	5.0	8.500	–0.3	13.200	5.4	8.333		13.733	13.466
3rd place, bronze medalist(s)	(North Korea) Jo Kyong-byol	5.0	8.366		13.366	4.0	8.566		12.566	12.966
4	(Vietnam) Nguyen Thi Quynh Nhu	4.4	8.700		13.100	4.0	8.700		12.700	12.900
5	(Chinese Taipei) Liao Yi-chun	4.2	8.633		12.833	3.8	8.666		12.466	12.649
6	(Chinese Taipei) Huang Tzu-hsing	4.2	8.366		12.566	4.0	8.500		12.500	12.533
7	(Kazakhstan) Darya Yassinskaya	4.0	8.666		12.666	4.6	7.733		12.333	12.449
8	(South Korea) Lim Sumin	4.2	8.700		12.900	3.4	8.466		11.866	12.383

=== Uneven bars ===
Rank	Gymnast	D Score	E Score	Pen.	Total
1st place, gold medalist(s)	(China) Yang Fanyuwei	6.4	8.166		14.566
2nd place, silver medalist(s)	(North Korea) Jon Jang-mi	6.0	7.366		13.366
3rd place, bronze medalist(s)	(Philippines) Levi Ruivivar	5.6	7.500		13.100
4	(North Korea) Jo Kyong-byol	5.9	7.066		12.966
5	(South Korea) Oh Soseon	5.1	7.766		12.866
6	(China) Hu Jiafei	6.2	6.633		12.833
7	(Uzbekistan) Dildora Aripova	5.1	7.666		12.766
8	(Uzbekistan) Aleksandra Shevchenko	4.0	7.866		11.866

=== Balance beam ===
Rank	Gymnast	D Score	E Score	Pen.	Total
1st place, gold medalist(s)	(China) Qin Xinyi	6.0	7.900	–0.1	13.800
2nd place, silver medalist(s)	(China) Chen Xinyi	5.8	7.900		13.700
3rd place, bronze medalist(s)	(North Korea) Kim Son-hyang	5.4	7.766		13.166
4	(North Korea) Pak Un-jong	5.9	7.100		13.000
5	(Uzbekistan) Dildora Aripova	5.0	7.500		12.500
6	(Chinese Taipei) Ting Hua-tien	5.3	7.166		12.466
7	(South Korea) Park Naoyoung	5.4	6.766		12.166
8	(Kazakhstan) Aida Bauyrzhanova	5.0	6.766		11.766

=== Floor exercise ===
Rank	Gymnast	D Score	E Score	Pen.	Total
1st place, gold medalist(s)	(Philippines) Emma Malabuyo	5.1	8.200		13.300
2nd place, silver medalist(s)	(China) Chen Xinyi	5.6	7.533		13.133
3rd place, bronze medalist(s)	(Kazakhstan) Aida Bauyrzhanova	5.0	8.066		13.066
4	(North Korea) Pak Un-jong	5.3	7.533		12.833
5	(Uzbekistan) Aleksandra Shevchenko	5.3	7.600	–0.1	12.800
6	(Chinese Taipei) Liao Yi-chun	5.0	7.666		12.666
7	(China) Qin Xinyi	4.8	7.733	–0.1	12.433
8	(South Korea) Lim Sumin	4.9	7.100		12.000

== Junior results ==
=== Individual all-around ===
Rank	Gymnast	Vault (gymnastics)	Uneven bars	Balance beam	Floor (gymnastics)	Total
1st place, gold medalist(s)	(Japan) Rinon Muneta	13.466	12.933	13.133	12.466	51.998
2nd place, silver medalist(s)	(China) Li Rongjinyi	12.700	13.433	12.833	12.766	51.732
3rd place, bronze medalist(s)	(Japan) Yuri Okura	12.766	12.733	12.366	12.533	50.398
4	(China) Chu Yiming	13.000	12.133	12.766	12.366	50.265
5	(South Korea) Hwang Seo-hyun	11.966	10.833	14.100	11.900	48.799
6	(South Korea) An So-yun	12.166	11.433	12.466	11.366	47.431
7	(Singapore) Amanda Yap	12.366	10.200	12.433	12.166	47.165
8	(North Korea) Han Hyo-gum	11.866	10.533	13.133	11.566	47.098

=== Vault ===
Rank	Gymnast	Vault 1				Vault 2				Total
Rank	Gymnast	D Score	E Score	Pen.	Score 1	D Score	E Score	Pen.	Score 2	Total
1st place, gold medalist(s)	(Japan) Rinon Muneta	4.8	8.866		13.666	4.4	8.733		13.133	13.399
2nd place, silver medalist(s)	(Japan) Mito Sumikama	4.4	8.933		13.333	3.8	8.833		12.633	12.983
3rd place, bronze medalist(s)	(China) Chu Yiming	4.4	8.533		12.933	3.8	8.666		12.466	12.699
4	(Kazakhstan) Evelina Yezhova	3.8	8.800		12.600	3.4	8.633		12.033	12.316
5	(Kazakhstan) Ameli Mukusheva	3.6	8.733		12.333	3.4	8.700		12.100	12.216
6	(Uzbekistan) Milana Gaynulina	3.6	8.500		12.100	3.4	8.633		12.033	12.066
7	(South Korea) An So-yun	3.2	8.633		11.833	3.4	8.466		11.866	11.849
8	(Hong Kong) Lau Karina Cheukgi	3.4	8.566		11.966	3.2	8.466		11.666	11.816

=== Uneven bars ===
Rank	Gymnast	D Score	E Score	Pen.	Total
1st place, gold medalist(s)	(Japan) Rinon Muneta	5.3	7.833		13.133
2nd place, silver medalist(s)	(China) Li Rongjinyi	5.1	7.833		12.933
3rd place, bronze medalist(s)	(Japan) Yuri Okura	4.6	8.166		12.766
4	(China) Chen Feng	5.4	6.833		12.233
5	(Chinese Taipei) Wu Yu-jhih	4.1	6.933		11.033
6	(South Korea) An So-yun	4.2	5.966		10.166
7	(South Korea) Lee Sena	4.7	5.133		9.833
8	(Uzbekistan) Milana Gaynulina	3.5	6.066		9.566

=== Balance beam ===
Rank	Gymnast	D Score	E Score	Pen.	Total
1st place, gold medalist(s)	(South Korea) Hwang Seo-hyun	5.9	8.266		14.166
2nd place, silver medalist(s)	(Singapore) Amanda Yap	4.6	8.200		12.800
2nd place, silver medalist(s)	(Japan) Mito Sumikama	5.0	7.800		12.800
4	(Japan) Rinon Muneta	5.3	7.400		12.700
5	(North Korea) Han Hyo-gum	5.4	7.100		12.600
6	(China) Li Rongjinyi	5.7	6.500		12.200
7	(China) Chu Yiming	5.1	6.900		12.000
8	(South Korea) An So-yun	4.9	6.466		11.366

=== Floor exercise ===
Rank	Gymnast	D Score	E Score	Pen.	Total
1st place, gold medalist(s)	(Japan) Yuri Okura	5.1	8.033		13.133
2nd place, silver medalist(s)	(China) Li Rongjinyi	4.9	8.066		12.966
3rd place, bronze medalist(s)	(Japan) Mito Sumikama	4.9	7.900		12.800
4	(South Korea) Hwang Seo-hyun	5.0	7.833		12.733
5	(Singapore) Colleen Hong	4.4	8.066		12.466
6	(Chinese Taipei) Wang Tz-chin	4.4	7.500		11.900
7	(China) Qin Ziyue	5.0	6.666		11.666
8	(Singapore) Amanda Yap	4.5	6.833		11.333
