= Jon Jang-mi =

North Korean artistic gymnast

- Born: 8 June 2001 (age 25) North Hwanghae Province

Gymnastics career
- Discipline: Women's artistic gymnastics
- Country represented: North Korea
Medal record
Representing North Korea
Asian Games
Silver medal – second place	2018 Jakarta	Team
Bronze medal – third place	2018 Jakarta	Uneven bars
Asian Championships
Silver medal – second place	2017 Bangkok	Team
Silver medal – second place	2024 Tashkent	Team
Silver medal – second place	2024 Tashkent	Uneven bars
Bronze medal – third place	2017 Bangkok	Uneven bars

Jon Jang-mi (born 8 June 2001) is a North Korean artistic gymnast. She is the 2018 Asian Games uneven bars bronze medalist and team silver medalist. At the Asian Championships, she is a two-time uneven bars medalist and a two-time team silver medalist. She also competed at the 2018 World Championships.

== Gymnastics career ==
Jon made her international debut at the 2017 Asian Championships in Bangkok and helped the North Korean team win the silver medal behind China by contributing scores on the uneven bars and balance beam. Individually, she advanced into the uneven bars final and won the bronze medal behind Luo Huan and Liu Tingting.

Jon represented North Korea at the 2018 Asian Games in Jakarta and competed in the all-around in the qualification round. She then contributed on the uneven bars and balance beam to help North Korea win a silver medal in the team final. She then won a bronze medal in the uneven bars finals, behind Liu and Luo. At the 2018 World Championships in Doha, she competed on the vault, uneven bars, and balance beam to help North Korea place 16th in the team qualification round. She did not advance into any of the individual finals.

Jon was not selected for North Korea's 2019 World Championships team. She did not compete internationally from 2019 until her return at the 2024 Asian Championships in Tashkent. There, she competed on the vault and the uneven bars to help North Korea win the team silver medal, behind China. Individually, she advanced to the uneven bars final and won the silver medal behind China's Yang Fanyuwei.
