= Yul Moldauer =

American gymnast (born 1996)

- Kyung-Tae
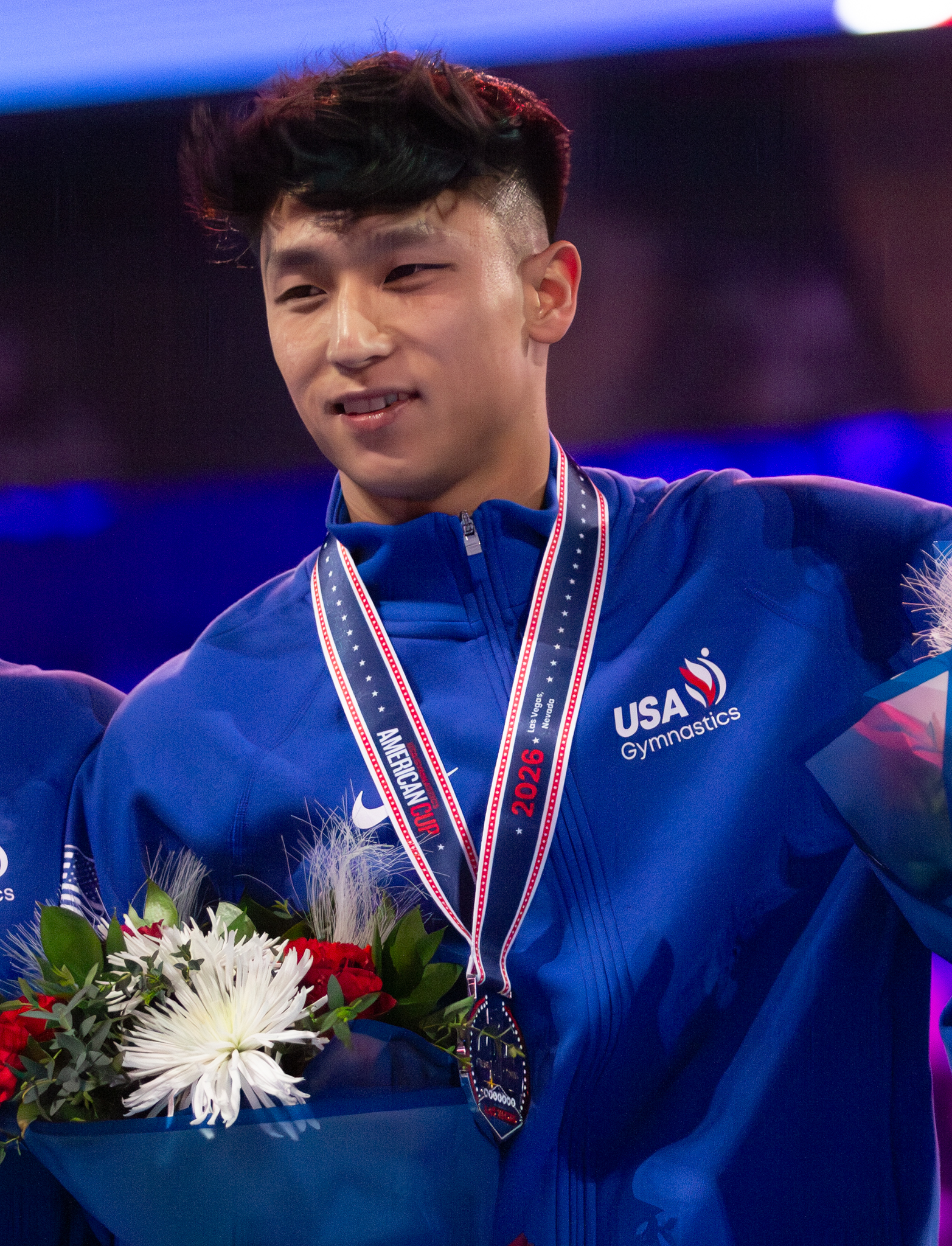
- Yul Molduaer at the 2026 American Cup

Personal information
- Full name: Yul Kyung-Tae Moldauer
- Born: August 26, 1996 (age 30) Seoul, South Korea
- Height: 5 ft 3 in (160 cm)

Gymnastics career
- Discipline: Men's artistic gymnastics
- Country represented: United States; (2016–2024, 2026–present)
- College team: Oklahoma Sooners
- Gym: 5280 Gymnastics
- Head coach: Vladimir Artemev
- Assistant coach: Alexander Artemev
- Former coach: Mark Williams
- Awards: Nissen-Emery Award (2019)
Medal record
Men's artistic gymnastics
Representing United States
Event	1st	2nd	3rd
World Championships	0	0	2
Pacific Rim Championships	5	0	0
Pan American Championships	8	2	1
Total	13	2	3
World Championships
Bronze medal – third place	2017 Montreal	Floor exercise
Bronze medal – third place	2023 Antwerp	Team
Pacific Rim Championships
Gold medal – first place	2024 Cali	Team
Gold medal – first place	2024 Cali	All-around
Gold medal – first place	2024 Cali	Floor exercise
Gold medal – first place	2024 Cali	Rings
Gold medal – first place	2024 Cali	Parallel bars
Pan American Championships
Gold medal – first place	2022 Rio de Janeiro	Team
Gold medal – first place	2022 Rio de Janeiro	Floor exercise
Gold medal – first place	2022 Rio de Janeiro	Pommel horse
Gold medal – first place	2022 Rio de Janeiro	Parallel bars
Gold medal – first place	2023 Medellín	Team
Gold medal – first place	2023 Medellín	All-around
Gold medal – first place	2023 Medellín	Floor exercise
Gold medal – first place	2023 Medellín	Parallel bars
Gold medal – first place	2026 Rio de Janeiro	Parallel bars
Silver medal – second place	2022 Rio de Janeiro	All-around
Silver medal – second place	2023 Medellín	Horizontal bar
Bronze medal – third place	2023 Medellín	Pommel horse
Bronze medal – third place	2026 Rio de Janeiro	Team
Bronze medal – third place	2026 Rio de Janeiro	All-around
FIG World Cup
Event	1st	2nd	3rd
All-Around World Cup	3	0	0
Total	3	0	0

Yul Kyung-Tae Moldauer OLY (born August 26, 1996) is an American artistic gymnast. He represented the United States at the 2020 Summer Olympics. He is the 2017 U.S. national all-around champion and the 2017 World bronze medalist on floor exercise. Additionally he was a member of the bronze medal-winning team at the 2023 World Championships.

== Early life and education ==
Moldauer was born in Seoul, South Korea on August 16, 1996, and named Kyung-Tae. Because his biological mother was chemically dependent, his adoptive father was told he might not develop into a "productive adult."

Before he was a year old, Peter Moldauer adopted him and named him Yul after the actor Yul Brynner. Moldauer has three siblings, Leah, Sorcha, and Sundo. He grew up on a farm in Colorado and attended Golden High School. He later attended the University of Oklahoma and graduated in May 2020 with a degree in communications.

== Gymnastics career ==
=== Junior ===
At age seven, Moldauer joined a local gym offering a free tryout, and at age ten, he joined 5280 Gymnastics, where he was coached by the Artemev family (Vladimir, Irina, and Alexander Artemev). In the next few years, he started winning state and regional meets, and eventually won a place on the Junior National Team.

In 2014, Moldauer won the junior title on the pommel horse at the U.S. National Championships. In 2015, he won the gold medal in the 18-year-old age division at the Junior Olympic National Championships.

In 2016, Moldauer won his first NCAA all-around title.

=== Senior ===
==== 2017 ====
Moldauer competed at the 2017 Winter Cup where he won gold in the all-around, rings and parallel bars, and silver on floor and vault. He competed at his first top-level international competition in March at the 2017 American Cup in Newark, New Jersey, where he placed first ahead of Olympic gold and silver medalist Oleg Verniaiev. Later that year, he became the NCAA champion on the floor exercise and rings, and placed second in the all-around and on parallel bars. In August, Moldauer won the all-around national title at the 2017 U.S. National Championships in Anaheim, California, and tied for the gold medal with Eddie Penev on floor exercise.

Moldauer made his first World Championship appearance at the 2017 World Championships in Montreal, Canada. He won the bronze medal in the floor exercise final and placed 7th in the all-around final.

==== 2018 ====
Moldauer won his second consecutive American Cup all-around title in March at the 2018 American Cup ahead of more accomplished gymnasts, including Kenzō Shirai of Japan, the 2017 World all-around bronze medalist, thanks to Moldauer achieving a top-three score on every apparatus. In August at the 2018 U.S. National Championships, he won the silver medal in the all-around behind Sam Mikulak.

In October, Moldauer competed at the 2018 World Championships in Doha, Qatar. He and the U.S. team finished fourth in the team competition. He placed 12th in the all-around final and fourth in the floor exercise final. In 2018, USA Gymnastics named him the 2018 Male Athlete of the Year.

==== 2019 ====
Moldauer competed at the 2019 Winter Cup in Las Vegas, finishing first in the all-around. Moldauer won his third consecutive American Cup all-around title in March at the 2019 American Cup, just 0.001 of a point ahead of fellow American Sam Mikulak. Moldauer suffered from right elbow pain and did not compete for six weeks. In April 2019, he was presented with the Nissen Emery Award, an annual prize given to the top male gymnast in the National Collegiate Athletic Association.

In August at the 2019 U.S. National Championships, he again won the silver medal in the all-around behind Sam Mikulak. Additionally, he won silver medals on floor exercise and parallel bars.

==== 2020–21 ====
Moldauer competed at the 2020 Winter Cup in Las Vegas, finishing first on vault, third on parallel bars, fourth on pommel horse, and fifth all-around. Due to his results at the Winter Cup Challenge, he was named to the 2020 senior men's team.

Moldauer finished first on parallel bars, third all-around, third on floor, fourth on pommel horse, and fifth on still rings at the 2021 Winter Cup Challenge in Indianapolis, Indiana. At 2021 U.S. Gymnastics Championships in Fort Worth, Texas, he finished first on parallel bars, second all-around, and third on floor and still rings. Moldauer was named to the 2020 Olympic team alongside Brody Malone, Sam Mikulak, and Shane Wiskus. He secured his spot on the team by finishing second in the all-around and finishing in top three on at least three apparatuses at the 2020 Olympic Trials in St. Louis, Missouri.

In November, Moldauer competed at the Arthur Gander Memorial. He won the four-event all-around, beating Nikita Nagornyy in the tie-breaker.

==== 2022 ====
Moldauer competed at the 2022 Winter Cup where he placed fourth in the all-around behind Vitaliy Guimaraes, Khoi Young, and Asher Hong. As a result he was selected to represent the USA at the DTB Pokal Team Challenge in Stuttgart alongside Guimaraes, Young, Hong, and Brody Malone.

In June, Moldauer was selected to represent the United States at the Pan American Championships alongside Riley Loos, Brody Malone, Colt Walker, and Shane Wiskus. On the first day of competition Moldauer competed on all six events to help qualify the United States in first place to the team final. Individually, he won silver in the all-around behind Caio Souza of Brazil and won gold on floor exercise, pommel horse, and parallel bars. During the team final Moldauer competed on floor, pommel horse, rings, and parallel bars to help the USA win gold ahead of the reigning team champion Brazil.

In August, Moldauer competed at the U.S. National Championships. He finished fifth in the all-around but scored the third-highest when removing domestic bonuses. Additionally, he finished third on the pommel horse. In October Moldauer was named as the traveling alternate for the World Championships team.

==== 2023 ====
Moldauer won the 2023 Winter Cup in February. He was later selected to represent the United States at the Pan American Championships alongside Shane Wiskus, Curran Phillips, Khoi Young, and Taylor Christopulos. On the first day of competition, Moldauer helped the USA qualify for the team final. Individually, he won gold in the all-around, floor exercise, and parallel bars, won silver on horizontal bar, and won bronze on pommel horse. Moldauer became the first American male gymnast to win the all-around title at the Pan American Gymnastics Championships. On the final day of competition, Moldauer helped the USA win their second consecutive team title.

In August, Moldauer competed at the Core Hydration Classic where he placed fifth on parallel bars. He next competed at the Xfinity National Championships where he placed fifth in the all-around but the national title on parallel bars. The following day he was named to the team to compete at the upcoming World Championships alongside Asher Hong, Khoi Young, Fred Richard, Paul Juda, and alternate Colt Walker.

At the World Championships, Moldauer helped the USA qualify to the team final in second place. Individually, he qualified for the parallel bars final. During the team final, he contributed scores on the floor exercise, pommel horse, rings, and parallel bars that helped the USA secure its third-place finish. In doing so, Moldauer won his second World Championships medal and helped the USA win its first team medal in nine years.

==== 2024 ====
Moldauer won first place in the all-around and floor exercise, as well as second on parallel bars, at the 2024 Winter Cup. This performance led him to be selected to compete at the DTB Pokal Team Challenge alongside Shane Wiskus, Riley Loos, Cameron Bock, and Curran Phillips. At this competition, he competed on five out of six events to help team USA win gold at the team final. He also qualified for the pommel horse event final and finished fourth. In April, he was selected to compete at the Pacific Rim Championships along with Cameron Bock, Riley Loos, Danila Leykin, Caden Clinton, and Kai Uemura. On the first day of the competition, he secured the all-around title and continued to win medals throughout the competition: gold in the team final, parallel bars, still rings, and floor exercise.

In June, Moldauer competed at the U.S. National Championships, finishing fourth in the all-around, second on floor exercise, and winning the national title on parallel bars. As a result, he was named to the senior national team for the ninth year in a row and qualified to Olympic Trials. After uncharacteristic mistakes made throughout the competition, Moldauer finished ninth in the all-around and was selected to be a non-traveling alternate for the 2024 Summer Olympics.

In the fall, Moldauer participated in the Gold Over America Tour.

==== 2025–2026: Suspension and return to competition ====
In January 2025, Moldauer was issued a 16-month ban backdated to September 2024 by the United States Anti-Doping Agency for an anti-doping rule violation for whereabouts failures (three missed tests in a 12-month period). He stated that he intended to keep training in hopes of making the 2028 Summer Olympics.

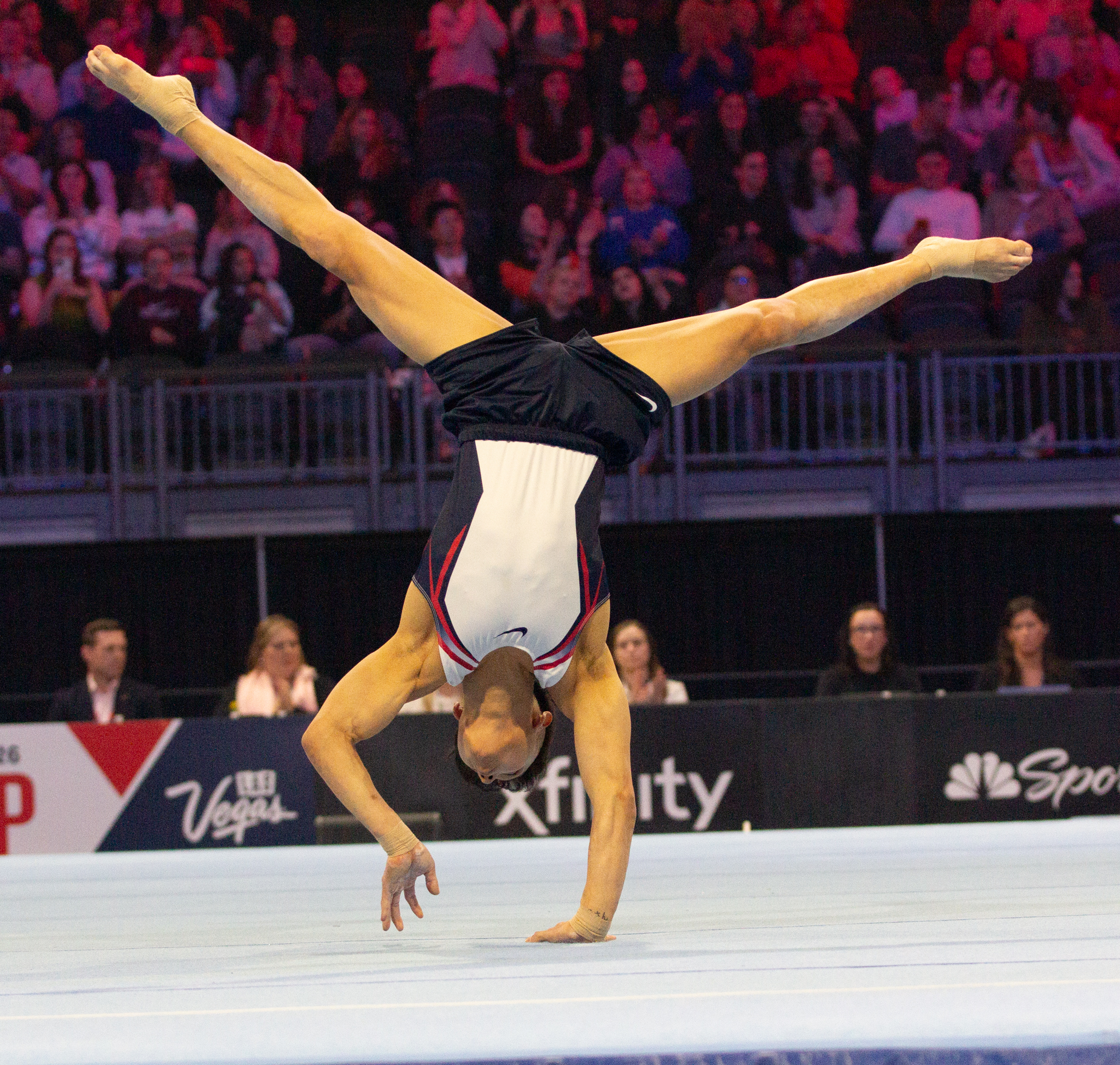
Moldauer competing at the 2026 American Cup

Moldauer's ban expired in January 2026, which allowed him to return to competition and compete at the Rocky Mountain Open, where he qualified to compete at the 2026 Winter Cup. At the Winter Cup Moldauer finished second in the all-around behind Fred Richard and placed first on parallel bars. As a result he was added back onto the national team. He was also selected to represent the United States at the 2026 American Cup, a mixed-team competition, alongside Asher Hong, Danila Leykin, Charleigh Bullock, Claire Pease, and Hezly Rivera.

At the American Cup, Moldauer helped Team USA win silver behind China. He next competed at the DTB Pokal Team Challenge where he helped the USA win team gold. Individually, he won silver in the all-around, bronze on pommel horse, and gold on parallel bars.

On May 11, 2026, he was selected to represent the United States at the 2026 Pan American Championships. At the competition Moldauer helped the USA win bronze as a team and individually he qualified to the all-around, pommel horse, rings, parallel bars, and horizontal bar event finals. He won bronze in the all-around behind Colombians Camilo Vera and Ángel Barajas. During event finals he won gold on parallel bars and placed fourth on pommel horse and rings and seventh on horizontal bar.

At the 2026 U.S. National Championships, Moldauer placed fifth in the all-around and won the national title on parallel bars. At the conclusion of the competition, Moldauer was selected as the traveling replacement athlete for the 2026 World Championships.

== Competitive history ==
Competitive history of Yul Moldauer
Year	Event	Team	AA	FX	PH	SR	VT	PB	HB
2015	Winter Cup		17	14	17	22	20	16	29
2015	U.S. National Championships		12	14	6	24	23	6	18
2016	Winter Cup		5	7	14	4	9	2nd place, silver medalist(s)	27
2016	NCAA Championships	1st place, gold medalist(s)	1st place, gold medalist(s)	3rd place, bronze medalist(s)			10	2nd place, silver medalist(s)	
2016	U.S. National Championships		5	5	8	7	13	12	15
2016	Olympic Trials		5	5	6	8	5	7	14
2017	Winter Cup		1st place, gold medalist(s)	2nd place, silver medalist(s)	11	1st place, gold medalist(s)	2nd place, silver medalist(s)	1st place, gold medalist(s)	12
2017	American Cup		1st place, gold medalist(s)						
2017	NCAA Championships	1st place, gold medalist(s)	2nd place, silver medalist(s)	1st place, gold medalist(s)		1st place, gold medalist(s)	4	3rd place, bronze medalist(s)	3rd place, bronze medalist(s)
2017	Guimaraes International	1st place, gold medalist(s)			2nd place, silver medalist(s)	1st place, gold medalist(s)		1st place, gold medalist(s)	
2017	U.S. National Championships		1st place, gold medalist(s)	1st place, gold medalist(s)	8	5	6	2nd place, silver medalist(s)	13
2017	World Championships	—N/a	7	3rd place, bronze medalist(s)					
2018	Winter Cup				7				
2018	American Cup		1st place, gold medalist(s)						
2018	NCAA Championships	1st place, gold medalist(s)	1st place, gold medalist(s)	1st place, gold medalist(s)	2nd place, silver medalist(s)	2nd place, silver medalist(s)	1st place, gold medalist(s)	1st place, gold medalist(s)	
2018	U.S. Championships		2nd place, silver medalist(s)	2nd place, silver medalist(s)	7	3rd place, bronze medalist(s)	2nd place, silver medalist(s)	3rd place, bronze medalist(s)	11
2018	World team trials		2nd place, silver medalist(s)						
2018	World Championships	4	12	4					
2019	Winter Cup		1st place, gold medalist(s)		4				
2019	American Cup		1st place, gold medalist(s)						
2019	NCAA Championships	2nd place, silver medalist(s)	6	38	3rd place, bronze medalist(s)	2nd place, silver medalist(s)	13	27	39
2019	U.S. National Championships		2nd place, silver medalist(s)	2nd place, silver medalist(s)	6	9	5	2nd place, silver medalist(s)	10
2019	World team trials		5						
2019	World Championships	4	16						
2020	Winter Cup		5	11	4	5	1st place, gold medalist(s)	3rd place, bronze medalist(s)	15
2020	Friendship & Solidarity Meet	2nd place, silver medalist(s)							
2021	Winter Cup		3rd place, bronze medalist(s)	3rd place, bronze medalist(s)	4	5	16	1st place, gold medalist(s)	12
2021	U.S. National Championships		2nd place, silver medalist(s)	3rd place, bronze medalist(s)	14	3rd place, bronze medalist(s)	9	1st place, gold medalist(s)	14
2021	Olympic Trials		2nd place, silver medalist(s)	3rd place, bronze medalist(s)	2nd place, silver medalist(s)	3rd place, bronze medalist(s)	9	1st place, gold medalist(s)	13
2021	Olympic Games	5		6					
2021	World Team Trials		1st place, gold medalist(s)	1st place, gold medalist(s)	4	3rd place, bronze medalist(s)		2nd place, silver medalist(s)	3rd place, bronze medalist(s)
2021	World Championships	—N/a	4					5	
2021	Arthur Gander Memorial		1st place, gold medalist(s)						
2021	Swiss Cup	DNS							
2022	Winter Cup		4	13	2nd place, silver medalist(s)	3rd place, bronze medalist(s)	20	2nd place, silver medalist(s)	21
2022	DTB Pokal Team Challenge	1st place, gold medalist(s)							
2022	Pan American Championships	1st place, gold medalist(s)	2nd place, silver medalist(s)	1st place, gold medalist(s)	1st place, gold medalist(s)	9		1st place, gold medalist(s)	
2022	U.S. Classic			19				5	34
2022	U.S. National Championships		5	7	3rd place, bronze medalist(s)	4	9	7	17
2022	World Championships	5 (Note: Moldauer was the team USA alternate)							
2022	Arthur Gander Memorial		2nd place, silver medalist(s)						
2022	Swiss Cup	1st place, gold medalist(s)							
2023	Winter Cup		1st place, gold medalist(s)						
2023	DTB Pokal Team Challenge	1st place, gold medalist(s)		2nd place, silver medalist(s)					
2023	Pan American Championships	1st place, gold medalist(s)	1st place, gold medalist(s)	1st place, gold medalist(s)	3rd place, bronze medalist(s)	4		1st place, gold medalist(s)	2nd place, silver medalist(s)
2023	U.S. Classic				28			5	40
2023	U.S. National Championships		5	23	3rd place, bronze medalist(s)	4		1st place, gold medalist(s)	34
2023	World Championships	3rd place, bronze medalist(s)						8	
2023	Arthur Gander Memorial		1st place, gold medalist(s)						
2023	Swiss Cup	1st place, gold medalist(s)							
2024	Winter Cup		1st place, gold medalist(s)	1st place, gold medalist(s)	7	4		2nd place, silver medalist(s)	12
2024	DTB Pokal Team Challenge	1st place, gold medalist(s)			4				
2024	Pacific Rim Championships	1st place, gold medalist(s)	1st place, gold medalist(s)	1st place, gold medalist(s)		1st place, gold medalist(s)		1st place, gold medalist(s)	5
2024	U.S. National Championships		4	2nd place, silver medalist(s)	12	8		1st place, gold medalist(s)	11
2024	Olympic Trials		9	9	13	8		6	13
2026	Rocky Mountain Open		3rd place, bronze medalist(s)						
2026	Winter Cup		2nd place, silver medalist(s)	33	6	2nd place, silver medalist(s)		1st place, gold medalist(s)	11
2026	American Cup	2nd place, silver medalist(s)							
2026	DTB Pokal Team Challenge	1st place, gold medalist(s)	2nd place, silver medalist(s)		3rd place, bronze medalist(s)			1st place, gold medalist(s)	
2026	Pan American Championships	3rd place, bronze medalist(s)	3rd place, bronze medalist(s)		4	4		1st place, gold medalist(s)	7
2026	U.S. National Championships		5	12	12	4		1st place, gold medalist(s)	13
2026	World Championships	6							
2026	Arthur Gander Memorial		2nd place, silver medalist(s)						
2026	Swiss Cup	4							
