= 2025 Asian Women's Artistic Gymnastics Championships =

Gymnastics event in South Korea

2025 Asian Artistic Gymnastics Championships
- Venue: Jecheon Gymnasium
- Location: Jecheon, South Korea
- Start date: 12 June 2025
- End date: 15 June 2025

The 2025 Asian Women's Artistic Gymnastics Championships was the 12th edition of the Asian Artistic Gymnastics Championships, and were held in Jecheon, South Korea from 12 to 15 June 2025.

== Participating countries ==
- China
- Chinese Taipei
- Hong Kong
- India
- Indonesia
- Japan
- Kazakhstan
- Kyrgyzstan
- Malaysia
- Mongolia
- Philippines
- Qatar
- Singapore
- South Korea
- Sri Lanka
- Thailand
- Uzbekistan
- Vietnam

== Medal summary ==
Event	Gold	Silver	Bronze
Senior
Team all-around	China; Qin Xinyi; Zhang Kexin; Zhang Xinyi; Zhang Yihan; Zhou Yaqin	Japan; Saki Kawakami; Rina Kishi; Haruka Nakamura; Aiko Sugihara	South Korea; Eom Do-hyun; Hwang Seo-hyun; Lee Yun-seo; Lim Su-min; Park Na-young
Individual all-around	(Japan) Aiko Sugihara	(Japan) Haruka Nakamura	(China) Qin Xinyi
Vault	(China) Zhang Yihan	(Vietnam) Nguyễn Thị Quỳnh Như	(India) Pranati Nayak
Uneven bars	(China) Qin Xinyi	(Japan) Haruka Nakamura	(China) Zhang Yihan
Balance beam	(South Korea) Hwang Seo-hyun	(Japan) Aiko Sugihara	(China) Zhou Yaqin
Floor exercise	(China) Zhou Yaqin	(Japan) Aiko Sugihara	(Japan) Haruka Nakamura
Junior
Team all-around	Japan; Rinon Muneta; Ayu Sarada; Minami Tobi; Nanami Togo	South Korea; Song Chaeyeon; Tak Somin; Lee Hyejin; Park Hyeran; Lee Seyeon	Hong Kong; Hiu Ching Lai; Tsz Ching Ray; Tim Ching Kiana Wong; Ila Zadie Chan; Ka Ching Karen Lau
Individual all-around	(Japan) Minami Tobi	(Japan) Ayu Sarada	(Philippines) Elisabeth Antone
Vault	(Japan) Minami Tobi	(Japan) Ayu Sarada	(Philippines) Elisabeth Antone
Uneven bars	(Japan) Rinon Muneta	(Japan) Ayu Sarada	(Chinese Taipei) Luo-Zhen Chen
Balance beam	(Japan) Nanami Togo	(Japan) Minami Tobi	(Hong Kong) Ila Zadie Chan
Floor exercise	(Japan) Nanami Togo (Japan) Minami Tobi	—N/a	(Mongolia) Sophie Shinebayar

== Medal table ==
=== Overall ===
* Host nation (South Korea)

Rank	Nation	Gold	Silver	Bronze	Total
1	Japan	8	9	1	18
2	China	4	0	3	7
3	South Korea*	1	1	1	3
4	Vietnam	0	1	0	1
5	Hong Kong	0	0	2	2
5	Philippines	0	0	2	2
7	Chinese Taipei	0	0	1	1
7	India	0	0	1	1
7	Mongolia	0	0	1	1
Totals (9 entries)		13	11	12	36

=== Senior ===
* Host nation (South Korea)

Rank	Nation	Gold	Silver	Bronze	Total
1	China	4	0	3	7
2	Japan	1	5	1	7
3	South Korea*	1	0	1	2
4	Vietnam	0	1	0	1
5	India	0	0	1	1
Totals (5 entries)		6	6	6	18

=== Junior ===
* Host nation (South Korea)

Rank	Nation	Gold	Silver	Bronze	Total
1	Japan	7	4	0	11
2	South Korea*	0	1	0	1
3	Hong Kong	0	0	2	2
3	Philippines	0	0	2	2
5	Chinese Taipei	0	0	1	1
5	Mongolia	0	0	1	1
Totals (6 entries)		7	5	6	18

== Senior results ==
=== Team all-around ===
Rank	Team	Vault (gymnastics)	Uneven bars	Balance beam	Floor (gymnastics)	Total
1st place, gold medalist(s)	China	39.933 (2)	40.699 (1)	43.299 (1)	39.432 (2)	163.363
1st place, gold medalist(s)	Zhang Yihan	13.800	14.266		12.800	163.363
1st place, gold medalist(s)	Qin Xinyi	12.900	13.700	13.733	13.266	163.363
1st place, gold medalist(s)	Zhang Kexin	13.200	12.733	12.266		163.363
1st place, gold medalist(s)	Zhang Xinyi	12.933	11.700	14.333	13.033	163.363
1st place, gold medalist(s)	Zhou Yaqin			15.233	13.133	163.363
2nd place, silver medalist(s)	Japan	40.398 (1)	40.132 (2)	41.699 (2)	40.732 (1)	162.961
2nd place, silver medalist(s)	Haruka Nakamura	12.833	13.666	14.233	13.333	162.961
2nd place, silver medalist(s)	Rina Kishi	13.166	13.466	13.600	DNS	162.961
2nd place, silver medalist(s)	Aiko Sugihara	13.766	13.000	13.866	14.133	162.961
2nd place, silver medalist(s)	Saki Kawakami	13.466	13.000	12.466	13.266	162.961
3rd place, bronze medalist(s)	South Korea	38.866 (3)	36.399 (3)	39.866 (3)	39.199 (3)	154.330
3rd place, bronze medalist(s)	Lee Yun-seo		12.533			154.330
3rd place, bronze medalist(s)	Park Na-young	13.000	12.300	12.800	13.066	154.330
3rd place, bronze medalist(s)	Eom Do-hyun	12.900	11.566	13.633	12.766	154.330
3rd place, bronze medalist(s)	Lim Su-min	12.966	10.933	12.100	13.033	154.330
3rd place, bronze medalist(s)	Hwang Seo-hyun	10.966		13.433	13.100	154.330
4	Chinese Taipei	37.932 (5)	36.366 (4)	38.866 (4)	35.362 (6)	148.796
4	Tonya Paulsson	12.966	13.400	13.500	12.633	148.796
4	Ting Hua-tien	11.766	11.800	12.233	11.100	148.796
4	Lin Yi-chen	12.100	11.166	12.400	11.466	148.796
4	Lai Pin-ju		10.433	12.966	11.533	148.796
4	Wu Sing-fen	12.866				148.796
5	Malaysia	36.966 (8)	33.132 (6)	38.566 (5)	36.399 (5)	145.063
5	Rachel Yeoh Li Wen		11.366	12.566	DNS	145.063
5	Yeap Kang Xian	12.733	11.300	13.100	12.300	145.063
5	Cadence Teh Zi Qi	12.200	10.466	12.900	12.066	145.063
5	Zarith Imaan Khalid	12.033	DNS	11.066	12.033	145.063
6	Kazakhstan	37.432 (6)	32.232 (8)	37.233 (6)	37.632 (4)	144.529
6	Aida Kurbanova		11.533	12.733	11.966	144.529
6	Evelina Yezhova	12.466	11.366	12.700	12.366	144.529
6	Arina Lebedeva	12.200	9.333	11.566	12.633	144.529
6	Medina Kapbassova		0.366			144.529
6	Darya Yassinskaya	12.766		11.800	12.633	144.529
7	Singapore	37.232 (7)	32.566 (7)	37.199 (7)	36.265 (7)	143.262
7	Emma Yap	12.300	11.300	12.166	12.433	143.262
7	Colleen Hong	11.666	11.066	12.600	10.900	143.262
7	Alena Tan	12.266	10.200		11.766	143.262
7	Amanda Yap	12.666	9.800	12.433	12.066	143.262
7	Emma Goh			11.866		143.262
8	Uzbekistan	38.232 (4)	33.299 (5)	35.165 (8)	35.665 (8)	142.361
8	Solikha Tursunboeva	12.233	11.566	12.133	11.933	142.361
8	Odinakhon Robidjonova	11.966	11.233	11.666	11.966	142.361
8	Shakhinabonu Yusufova	12.866	10.500	11.366	11.766	142.361
8	Oksana Chusovitina	13.133				142.361

=== Individual all-around ===
Rank	Gymnast	Vault (gymnastics)	Uneven bars	Balance beam	Floor (gymnastics)	Total
1st place, gold medalist(s)	(Japan) Aiko Sugihara	13.766	13.000	13.866	14.133	54.765
2nd place, silver medalist(s)	(Japan) Haruka Nakamura	12.833	13.666	14.233	13.333	54.065
3rd place, bronze medalist(s)	(China) Qin Xinyi	12.900	13.700	13.733	13.266	53.599
4	(Chinese Taipei) Tonya Paulsson	12.966	13.400	13.500	12.633	52.499
5	(China) Zhang Xinyi	12.933	11.700	14.333	13.033	51.999
6	(South Korea) Park Na-young	13.000	12.300	12.800	13.066	51.166
7	(South Korea) Eom Do-hyun	12.900	11.566	13.633	12.766	50.865
8	(Malaysia) Yeap Kang Xian	12.733	11.300	13.100	12.300	49.433

=== Vault ===
Rank	Gymnast	Vault 1				Vault 2				Total
Rank	Gymnast	D Score	E Score	Pen.	Score 1	D Score	E Score	Pen.	Score 2	Total
1st place, gold medalist(s)	(China) Zhang Yihan	5.2	8.833		14.033	4.0	8.866		12.866	13.650
2nd place, silver medalist(s)	(Vietnam) Nguyễn Thị Quỳnh Như	5.2	8.800		14.000	4.0	8.766		12.766	13.583
3rd place, bronze medalist(s)	(India) Pranati Nayak	5.2	8.466		13.666	4.4	8.466		12.866	13.466
4	(India) Protistha Samanta	4.4	8.366		12.766	4.0	8.866		12.866	13.016
5	(Thailand) Thantida-Sophia Ruecker	4.2	8.733		12.933	4.0	8.500		12.500	12.917
6	(Uzbekistan) Shakhinabonu Yusufova	4.2	8.500		12.700	4.0	8.666		12.666	12.883
7	(Kazakhstan) Evelina Yezhova	4.2	8.433		12.633	4.0	8.700		12.700	12.866
8	(Uzbekistan) Oksana Chusovitina	4.4	8.133	0.100	12.433	-	-	-	DNS	DNF

=== Uneven bars ===
Rank	Gymnast	D Score	E Score	Pen.	Total
1st place, gold medalist(s)	(China) Qin Xinyi	5.8	7.833		13.633
2nd place, silver medalist(s)	(Japan) Haruka Nakamura	6.1	7.500		13.600
3rd place, bronze medalist(s)	(China) Zhang Yihan	6.2	7.066		13.266
4	(Japan) Rina Kishi	5.4	7.833		13.233
5	(Chinese Taipei) Tonya Paulsson	5.1	8.100		13.200
6	(South Korea) Lee Yun-seo	5.4	7.700		13.100
7	(South Korea) Park Na-young	4.7	7.866		12.566
8	(Chinese Taipei) Ting Hua-tien	4.1	8.133		12.233

=== Balance beam ===
Rank	Gymnast	D Score	E Score	Pen.	Total
1st place, gold medalist(s)	(South Korea) Hwang Seo-hyun	6.3	8.333		14.633
2nd place, silver medalist(s)	(Japan) Aiko Sugihara	6.0	8.166		14.166
3rd place, bronze medalist(s)	(China) Zhou Yaqin	6.2	8.066	0.1	14.166
4	(Japan) Haruka Nakamura	6.1	7.766		13.866
5	(South Korea) Eom Do-hyun	6.0	7.533		13.533
6	(Malaysia) Yeap Kang Xian	5.5	7.733		13.233
7	(China) Zhang Xinyi	6.0	7.200		13.200
8	(Chinese Taipei) Tonya Paulsson	4.8	7.133		11.933

=== Floor exercise ===
Rank	Gymnast	D Score	E Score	Pen.	Total
1st place, gold medalist(s)	(China) Zhou Yaqin	5.5	8.233		13.733
2nd place, silver medalist(s)	(Japan) Aiko Sugihara	5.8	7.866		13.666
3rd place, bronze medalist(s)	(Japan) Haruka Nakamura	5.5	7.633		13.133
4	(South Korea) Park Na-young	4.8	8.100		12.900
5	(South Korea) Hwang Seo-hyun	4.9	7.933		12.833
6	(Chinese Taipei) Tonya Paulsson	5.0	7.900	0.1	12.800
7	(China) Qin Xinyi	5.0	7.800		12.800
8	(Kazakhstan) Darya Yassinskaya	4.8	6.900	0.1	11.600

== Junior results ==
=== Individual all-around ===
Rank	Gymnast	Vault (gymnastics)	Uneven bars	Balance beam	Floor (gymnastics)	Total
1st place, gold medalist(s)	(Japan) Minami Tobi	13.133	12.033	13.100	12.900	51.166
2nd place, silver medalist(s)	(Japan) Ayu Sarada	13.100	12.100	12.433	12.833	50.466
3rd place, bronze medalist(s)	(Philippines) Elisabeth Antone	12.766	11.500	12.233	12.066	48.565
4	(South Korea) Song Chaeyeon	12.533	10.300	12.433	11.266	46.532
5	(Hong Kong) Hiu Ching Lai	12.366	9.833	12.366	11.833	46.398
6	(Mongolia) Sophie Shinebayar	11.933	9.900	12.200	12.266	46.299
7	(Myanmar) Pan Ei Phyu	12.133	9.200	12.533	11.800	45.666
8	(Singapore) Charlotte Phoon	11.833	9.766	12.400	11.566	45.565

=== Vault ===
Rank	Gymnast	Vault 1				Vault 2				Total
Rank	Gymnast	D Score	E Score	Pen.	Score 1	D Score	E Score	Pen.	Score 2	Total
1st place, gold medalist(s)	(Japan) Minami Tobi	4.4	8.666		13.066	4.8	8.466	0.100	13.166	13.116
2nd place, silver medalist(s)	(Japan) Ayu Sarada	4.4	8.633		13.033	3.8	8.700		12.500	12.767
3rd place, bronze medalist(s)	(Philippines) Elisabeth Antone	4.2	8.666		12.866	3.6	8.733	0.100	12.233	12.550
4	(South Korea) Tak So-min	3.6	8.733		12.333	4.2	8.433	0.100	12.533	12.433
5	(South Korea) Park Hye-ran	4.2	8.433		12.633	3.4	8.500		11.900	12.267
6	(Hong Kong) Hiu Ching Lai	3.6	8.666		12.266	3.6	8.533		12.133	12.200
7	(Myanmar) Pan Ei Phyu	3.4	8.833		12.233	3.2	8.800		12.000	12.117
8	(Chinese Taipei) Lin Pei-Han	3.6	8.333		11.933	3.4	8.433		11.833	11.883

=== Uneven bars ===
Rank	Gymnast	D Score	E Score	Pen.	Total
1st place, gold medalist(s)	(Japan) Rinon Muneta	5.6	7.333		12.933
2nd place, silver medalist(s)	(Japan) Ayu Sarada	4.9	7.733		12.633
3rd place, bronze medalist(s)	(Chinese Taipei) Chen Luo-Zhen	4.2	7.266		11.466
4	(Philippines) Elisabeth Antone	3.6	7.800		11.400
5	(South Korea) Song Chae-yeon	4.2	7.100		11.300
6	(India) Avantika Negi	2.9	7.433		10.333
7	(Singapore) Ariel Lin	2.7	7.566		10.266
8	(Philippines) Maxine Amira Bondoc	3.2	6.700		9.900

=== Balance beam ===
Rank	Gymnast	D Score	E Score	Pen.	Total
1st place, gold medalist(s)	(Japan) Nanami Togo	5.0	7.600		12.600
2nd place, silver medalist(s)	(Japan) Minami Tobi	4.5	8.066		12.566
3rd place, bronze medalist(s)	(Hong Kong) Ila Zadie Chan	4.7	7.866	0.100	12.466
4	(Uzbekistan) Asliyakhon Abdukadirova	4.7	7.500		12.200
4	(Hong Kong) Tim Ching Kiana Wong	4.5	7.700		12.200
6	(Myanmar) Pan Ei Phyu	4.5	7.366		11.866
7	(South Korea) Song Chae-yeon	4.3	6.966		11.266
8	(Singapore) Charlotte Phoon	4.1	6.933		11.033

=== Floor exercise ===
Rank	Gymnast	D Score	E Score	Pen.	Total
1st place, gold medalist(s)	(Japan) Nanami Togo	5.1	7.700		12.800
1st place, gold medalist(s)	(Japan) Minami Tobi	5.1	7.700		12.800
3rd place, bronze medalist(s)	(Mongolia) Sophie Shinebayar	4.4	7.633	0.100	11.933
4	(Chinese Taipei) Lin Pei-Han	4.4	7.100		11.500
5	(Kazakhstan) Kamila Dospolova	4.6	6.700		11.300
6	(Uzbekistan) Milana Gaynulina	4.5	6.766		11.266
7	(Uzbekistan) Asliyakhon Abdukadirova	4.6	6.600		11.200
8	(Philippines) Elisabeth Antone	4.3	6.700		11.000
