= Aida Bauyrzhanova =

Kazakh artistic gymnast

Aida Bauyrzhanova Аида Бауыржанова
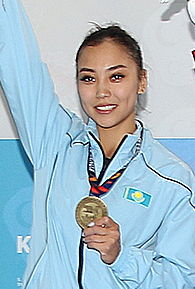
- Bauyrzhanova at the Islamic Solidarity Games in 2022

Personal information
- Full name: Aida Bauyrzhanova
- Born: 13 December 1997 (age 28) Astana, Kazakhstan
- Spouse: Nariman Kurbanov (m. 2024)

Gymnastics career
- Discipline: Women's artistic gymnastics
- Country represented: Kazakhstan (2012–present)
- Club: Astana Specialised Youth Sports School of Olympic Reserve No.1
- Head coach: Vera Latynina
Medal record
Representing Kazakhstan
Asian Championships
Bronze medal – third place	2024 Tashkent	Floor exercise
Islamic Solidarity Games
Gold medal – first place	2021 Konya	Floor exercise
Silver medal – second place	2021 Konya	Balance beam
Bronze medal – third place	2021 Konya	Team
Bronze medal – third place	2021 Konya	Uneven bars

Aida Kurbanova (née Bauyrzhanova Kazakh: Аида Құрбанова née Бауыржанова; born 13 December 1997) is a Kazakh artistic gymnast. She is the 2021 Islamic Solidarity Games champion on floor exercise.

== Early and personal life ==
Bauyrzhanova began training in gymnastics in 2005.

In September 2024 she married fellow Kazakh gymnast Nariman Kurbanov. In February 2026, they announced they were expecting their first child together. In June 2026, they announced the birth of their daughter.

== Gymnastics career ==
=== 2012 ===
Bauyrzhanova made her international debut at the 2012 Junior Asian Championships where she helped Kazakhstan finish fourth as a team. Individually she placed fourth in the all-around.

=== 2013–18 ===
Bauyrzhanova turned senior in 2013. She competed at the Anadia Challenge Cup and the 2013 Voronin Cup.

At the 2014 Asian Games Bauyrzhanova finished eleventh in the all-around.

At the 2015 Asian Championships Bauyrzhanova helped Kazakhstan finish fifth as a team and individually she finished thirteenth in the all-around. Later that year she competed at her first World Championships. Bauyrzhanova finished 191st in qualifications and did not advance to any event finals.

Bauyrzhanova was unable to compete in international competitions in 2016 or 2017 due to an elbow injury.

Bauyrzhanova returned to international competition at the 2018 Asian Games. She finished twenty-third in the all-around. She next competed at the World Championships where she finished 111th during qualifications.

=== 2019–22 ===
Bauyrzhanova competed at the Melbourne World Cup where she finished seventh on floor exercise. At the 2019 Asian Championships she finished nineteenth in the all-around. She next competed at the Summer Universiade but did not qualify for any event finals. In December Bauyrzhanova competed at the Voronin Cup where she placed sixth in the all-around, fourth on uneven bars, third on balance beam, and second on floor exercise.

Most competitions were canceled or postponed in 2020 due to the COVID-19 pandemic. Bauyrzhanova competed at the Koper Challenge Cup in 2021 where she finished sixth on floor exercise.

Bauyrzhanova competed at the 2022 World Cups in Doha, Cairo, and Baku. At the Asian Championships Bauyrzhanova finished ninth in the all-around and qualified to compete as an individual at the 2022 World Championships. Additionally she placed eighth during the balance beam final.

In August Bauyrzhanova competed at the Islamic Solidarity Games alongside Ayazhan Shamshitdinova. They finished third as a team behind Turkey and Uzbekistan. Individually Bauyrzhanova placed first on floor exercise, second on balance beam behind Dildora Aripova, and third on uneven bars behind Sevgi Seda Kayışoğlu and Bengisu Yıldız.

== Competitive history ==
Competitive history of Aida Bauyrzhanova
Year	Event	Team	AA	VT	UB	BB	FX
2012
2012	Junior Asian Championships	4	4	4	5	6	
2013	Voronin Cup		10	6			
2014	Bosphorus Tournament		5		3rd place, bronze medalist(s)		1st place, gold medalist(s)
2014	Asian Games	6	11				
2015
2015	Asian Championships	5	13				
2015	World Championships		191				
2017	Kazakhstan Cup		3rd place, bronze medalist(s)		6	1st place, gold medalist(s)	
2018	Kazakhstan Championships		8			3rd place, bronze medalist(s)	
2018	Asian Games	11	23				
2018	World Championships		111				
2019	Melbourne World Cup						7
2019	Asian Championships		19				
2019	Summer Universiade		25				
2019	Voronin Cup		6		4	3rd place, bronze medalist(s)	2nd place, silver medalist(s)
2021	Koper Challenge Cup						6
2022	Doha World Cup						6
2022	Cairo World Cup						7
2022	Asian Championships	5	9			8	
2022	Islamic Solidarity Games	3rd place, bronze medalist(s)	5		3rd place, bronze medalist(s)	2nd place, silver medalist(s)	1st place, gold medalist(s)
2022	Mersin Challenge Cup			5		5	4
2022	World Championships		66				
2023	Cairo World Cup						4
2023	Asian Championships	4	10				
2023	Mersin Challenge Cup						7
2023	Asian Games	6	10		7		
2024	Cottbus World Cup						7
2024	Doha World Cup			8			8
2024	Asian Championships	6	4			8	3rd place, bronze medalist(s)
