= Pan American Artistic Gymnastics Championships – Men's individual all-around =

The Pan American Gymnastics Championships were first held in 1997.

Three medals are awarded: gold for first place, silver for second place, and bronze for third place.

== Medalists ==
Year	Location	Gold	Silver	Bronze	Ref
1997	(Colombia) Medellín	(Cuba) Erick López	(Cuba) Francisco Diaz	(Cuba) Lazaro Lamelas Ramirez	
2001	(Mexico) Cancún	(Cuba) Erick López	(Cuba) Charles León Tamayo	(Puerto Rico) Luis Vargas Velásquez	
2005	(Brazil) Rio de Janeiro	(Cuba) Abel Driggs Santos	(Puerto Rico) Luis Vargas Velásquez	(Brazil) Mosiah Rodrigues	
2010	(Mexico) Guadalajara	(Mexico) Daniel Corral	(United States) Glen Ishino	(Colombia) Jorge Hugo Giraldo	
2014	(Canada) Mississauga	(Colombia) Jossimar Calvo	(Cuba) Manrique Larduet	(United States) Sean Melton	
2018	(Peru) Lima	(Cuba) Manrique Larduet	(Canada) René Cournoyer	(United States) Cameron Bock	
2021	(Brazil) Rio de Janeiro	(Brazil) Caio Souza	(United States) Paul Juda	(Brazil) Diogo Soares	
2022	(Brazil) Rio de Janeiro	(Brazil) Caio Souza	(United States) Yul Moldauer	(Canada) Félix Dolci	
2023	(Colombia) Medellín	(United States) Yul Moldauer	(United States) Shane Wiskus	(Brazil) Yuri Guimarães	
2024	(Colombia) Santa Marta	(Brazil) Caio Souza	(Chile) Luciano Letelier	(Argentina) Santiago Mayol	
2025	Panama City	(Canada) Félix Dolci	(United States) Joshua Karnes	(Brazil) Diogo Soares	
2026	(Brazil) Rio de Janeiro	(Colombia) Camilo Vera	(Colombia) Ángel Barajas	(United States) Yul Moldauer	

== Medal table ==
Rank	Nation	Gold	Silver	Bronze	Total
1	Cuba (CUB)	4	3	1	8
2	Brazil (BRA)	3	0	4	7
3	Colombia (COL)	2	1	1	4
4	United States (USA)	1	5	3	9
5	Canada (CAN)	1	1	1	3
6	Mexico (MEX)	1	0	0	1
7	Puerto Rico (PUR)	0	1	1	2
8	Chile (CHI)	0	1	0	1
9	Argentina (ARG)	0	0	1	1
Totals (9 entries)		12	12	12	36
