= Zachary Nuñez =

Filipino gymnast (born 2001)

- Born: December 15, 2001 (age 24)

Gymnastics career
- Discipline: Men's artistic gymnastics
- Country represented: Philippines
- College team: Oklahoma (2021–2025)

Zachary Nuñez (born December 15, 2001) is a Filipino-American artistic gymnast.

== Early life and education ==
Zachary Nuñez was born on December 15, 2001 to Ruel and Joy Nuñez. He has two siblings. He studied at the Cypress Woods High School in Cypress, Texas before he attended the University of Oklahoma.

== Gymnastics career ==
=== College ===
In college, Nuñez competed for the Oklahoma Sooners in the NCAA Division I from 2021 to 2025.

=== National team ===
Nunez fulfilled his pre-college aspiration of being able to represent the Philippines internationally, when he participated at the 2026 American Cup. He then appeared at the 2026 Asian Men's Artistic Gymnastics Championships in Zunyi, China.

He featured for the country again at the 2026 Asian Games in Aichi and Nagoya, Japan. He competed as part of the men's artistic gymnastics team and contributed on the pommel horse, high bar and parallel bars apparatuses.

== Coaching ==
Nuñez was appointed as an assistant coach in August 2026 to head tactician JD Reive of the Army Black Knights gymnastics team.

== Competitive history ==
Competitive history of Zachary Nuñez at the junior level
Year	Event	Team	AA	FX	PH	SR	VT	PB	HB
2016	U.S. National Championships				5				
2018	U.S. National Championships		5	4				4	4
2019	U.S. National Championships		7		5			2nd place, silver medalist(s)	3rd place, bronze medalist(s)

Competitive history of Zachary Nuñez at the senior level
Year	Event	Team	AA	FX	PH	SR	VT	PB	HB
2022	Winter Cup				3rd place, bronze medalist(s)				
2026
2026	Asian Championships	7							
2026	Asian Games	6							
