= Zhang Kexin (gymnast) =

Chinese artistic gymnast

- 张可欣
- Full name: Zhang Kexin
- Born: 10 December 2009 (age 16) Huangshi, Hubei, China

Gymnastics career
- Discipline: Women's artistic gymnastics
- Country represented: China; (2024–present)
Medal record
Representing China
Asian Championships
Gold medal – first place	2025 Jecheon	Team
Event / 1st / 2nd / 3rd; Apparatus World Cup / 1 / 1 / 1

Zhang Kexin (born 10 December 2009) is a Chinese artistic gymnast. She is a three-time FIG World Cup medalist.

== Early life ==
At six years old Zhang was spotted by Yao Juying, Cheng Fei's first coach, and was sent to Huangshi Sports School to focus on gymnastics. At the age of 7 she joined the Huangshi City Team.

== Junior gymnastics career ==
As a junior-level gymnast Zhang only competed domestically. In 2023 she competed at the Chinese National Student-Youth Games where she finished seventh in the all-around but won bronze on balance beam. In 2024 Zhang was officially added to the Chinese national gymnastics team.

== Senior gymnastics career ==
In 2025 Zhang became age-eligible for senior level competition. She made her senior and international debut at the Cottbus World Cup where she won three medals – gold on uneven bars, silver on balance beam, and bronze on floor exercise.

== Competitive history ==
Year	Event	Team	AA	VT	UB	BB	FX
Junior
2022	Chinese Youth Championships		10				6
2023	Chinese Championships	8					
2023	Chinese National Student-Youth Games	8	7			3rd place, bronze medalist(s)	
2024	Chinese Individual Championships		8				
Senior
2025	Cottbus World Cup				1st place, gold medalist(s)	2nd place, silver medalist(s)	3rd place, bronze medalist(s)
2025	Chinese Championships	6	5		4		
2025	Asian Championships	1st place, gold medalist(s)					
2025	Chinese National Games	3rd place, bronze medalist(s)			8		
