= 2026 American Cup =

United States artistic gymnastics competition

- Venue: Lee's Family Forum
- Location: Henderson, Nevada, U.S.
- Dates: March 7, 2026
- Nations: 8

Medalists
gold medal	Ke Qinqin; Tian Zhuofan; Zhang Qingying; Li Hongyan; Xie Chenyi; Zhang Yangyu	China
silver medal	Charleigh Bullock; Claire Pease; Hezly Rivera; Asher Hong; Danila Leykin; Yul Moldauer	United States
bronze medal	Rina Kishi; Haruka Nakamura; Daiki Hashimoto; Tomoharu Tsunogai	Japan

The 2026 American Cup was an artistic gymnastics competition. It was the first edition of the American Cup since 2020 and was the first time it used a mixed team format.

== Background ==
The last edition of the American Cup was held in 2020 and, like previous iterations, was an individual competition. In 2025, USA Gymnastics announced that the American Cup would return in 2026 using a mixed team format. The addition was a prelude to the 2028 Summer Olympics where a mixed-gender team event will debut on the artistic gymnastics schedule. A mixed team event was previously contested at the 2025 European Championships.

== Format ==
Up to three men and three women may be named to each team, with no more than two of each gender competing on any apparatus.

== Medalists ==
Event	Gold	Silver	Bronze
Mixed team	China; Ke Qinqin; Tian Zhuofan; Zhang Qingying; Li Hongyan; Xie Chenyi; Zhang Yangyu	United States; Charleigh Bullock; Claire Pease; Hezly Rivera; Asher Hong; Danila Leykin; Yul Moldauer	Japan; Rina Kishi; Haruka Nakamura; Daiki Hashimoto; Tomoharu Tsunogai

== Participants ==
Country	Women	Men	Photos
Brazil	Gabriela Bouças; Ana Luiza Lima; Sophia Weisberg	Vitaliy Guimarães; Diogo Paes; Diogo Soares	
China	Ke Qinqin; Tian Zhuofan; Zhang Qingying	Li Hongyan; Xie Chenyi; Zhang Yangyu	Category:China at the 2026 American Cup on Wikimedia Commons
Great Britain	Abigail Martin; Emily Roper; Ruby Stacey	Oakley Banks; Sam Mostowfi; Sol Scott	Category:Great Britain at the 2026 American Cup on Wikimedia Commons
Japan	Rina Kishi; Haruka Nakamura	Daiki Hashimoto; Tomoharu Tsunogai	Category:Japan at the 2026 American Cup on Wikimedia Commons
Mexico	Natalia Escalera; Mariangela Flores; Paulina Guerra	Rodrigo Gómez; Isaac Núñez; Mario Rojas	Category:Mexico at the 2026 American Cup on Wikimedia Commons
Philippines	Chiara Andrew; Llya Escoses; Haylee Garcia	Evan Aliwalas; Zach Nunez	
Spain	Marina Escudero; Alba Petisco	Nicolau Mir; Joel Plata	Category:Spain at the 2026 American Cup on Wikimedia Commons
United States	Charleigh Bullock; Claire Pease; Hezly Rivera	Asher Hong; Danila Leykin; Yul Moldauer	Category:United States at the 2026 American Cup on Wikimedia Commons

== Results ==
=== Round one ===
Rank	Name	Score	Total
1	China		54.500
1	Zhang Yangyu	14.000	54.500
1	Zhang Qingying	13.850	54.500
1	Li Hongyan	13.700	54.500
1	Ke Qinqin	12.950	54.500
2	Japan		52.050
2	Daiki Hashimoto	14.200	52.050
2	Haruka Nakamura	11.600	52.050
2	Tomoharu Tsunogai	12.950	52.050
2	Rina Kishi	13.300	52.050
3	United States		51.200
3	Yul Moldauer	12.450	51.200
3	Claire Pease	13.000	51.200
3	Danila Leykin	14.000	51.200
3	Charleigh Bullock	11.750	51.200
4	Spain		50.150
4	Nicolau Mir	13.800	50.150
4	Alba Petisco	11.650	50.150
4	Joel Plata	11.700	50.150
4	Marina Escudero	13.000	50.150
5	Mexico		50.150
5	Rodrigo Gómez	11.900	50.150
5	Paulina Guerra	12.200	50.150
5	Isaac Núñez	13.350	50.150
5	Natalia Escalera	12.700	50.150
6	(United Kingdom) Great Britain		50.050
6	Sam Mostowfi	12.450	50.050
6	Ruby Stacey	13.200	50.050
6	Sol Scott	13.050	50.050
6	Emily Roper	11.350	50.050
7	Brazil		49.750
7	Vitaliy Guimaraes	13.300	49.750
7	Ana Luiza Lima	12.450	49.750
7	Diogo Soares	13.000	49.750
7	Gabriela Bouças	11.000	49.750
8	Philippines		45.250
8	Zach Nunez	12.550	45.250
8	Llya Escoses	9.150	45.250
8	Evan Aliwalas	12.550	45.250
8	Haylee Garcia	11.700	45.250

the team advanced to round two

=== Round two ===
Rank	Name	Score	Total
1	Japan		54.100
1	Daiki Hashimoto	13.950	54.100
1	Haruka Nakamura	12.150	54.100
1	Tomoharu Tsunogai	14.900	54.100
1	Rina Kishi	13.100	54.100
2	China		52.650
2	Zhang Yangyu	13.500	52.650
2	Zhang Qingying	12.700	52.650
2	Xie Chenyi	13.350	52.650
2	Ke Qinqin	13.100	52.650
3	United States		51.500
3	Asher Hong	10.950	51.500
3	Hezly Rivera	13.400	51.500
3	Yul Moldauer	13.050	51.500
3	Charleigh Bullock	14.100	51.500
4	Spain		50.650
4	Nicolau Mir	13.950	50.650
4	Alba Petisco	12.000	50.650
4	Joel Plata	12.100	50.650
4	Marina Escudero	12.600	50.650
5	(United Kingdom) Great Britain		49.750
5	Sol Scott	13.450	49.750
5	Abigail Martin	10.300	49.750
5	Oakley Banks	13.400	49.750
5	Emily Roper	12.600	49.750
6	Mexico		47.900
6	Mario Rojas	11.650	47.900
6	Mariangela Flores	12.200	47.900
6	Isaac Núñez	13.050	47.900
6	Natalia Escalera	11.000	47.900

the team advanced to round three

=== Round three ===
Rank	Name	Score	Total
1	China		57.250
1	Li Hongyan	14.800	57.250
1	Zhang Qingying	13.550	57.250
1	Xie Chenyi	14.450	57.250
1	Tian Zhuofan	14.450	57.250
2	United States		54.700
2	Danila Leykin	13.150	54.700
2	Hezly Rivera	13.600	54.700
2	Asher Hong	14.100	54.700
2	Claire Pease	13.850	54.700
3	Japan		54.100
3	Daiki Hashimoto	14.950	54.100
3	Haruka Nakamura	12.700	54.100
3	Tomoharu Tsunogai	14.400	54.100
3	Rina Kishi	12.050	54.100
4	Spain		47.900
4	Nicolau Mir	12.250	47.900
4	Alba Petisco	12.050	47.900
4	Joel Plata	11.350	47.900
4	Marina Escudero	12.250	47.900

== Nastia Liukin Cup ==
The Nastia Liukin Cup
- Venue: Lee's Family Forum
- Location: Henderson, Nevada, U.S.
- Dates: March 7, 2026

Medalists
gold medal	Josie Lynch (Senior); Reagan Murphy (Junior)
silver medal	Shea Orlando (Senior); Keria Cameron (Junior)
bronze medal	Erin Davis (Senior); Annie Cole (Junior)

The 17th annual Nastia Liukin Cup was held in conjunction with the 2026 American Cup. From 2010 until 2020, the competition was always held on the Friday night before the American Cup, in the same arena. Between 2021 and 2025, the Nastia Liukin Cup was held in conjunction with the Winter Cup.

=== Medal winners ===
Event	Gold	Silver	Bronze
Senior
All-around	Josie Lynch	Shea Orlando	Erin Davis
Junior
All-around	Reagan Murphy	Keria Cameron	Annie Cole

== See also ==
- Swiss Cup (gymnastics)
