= Qin Xinyi =

Chinese gymnast

- 秦心怡
- Qin at the 2026 Swiss Cup

Personal information
- Born: 28 August 2008 (age 18) Guangxi, China

Gymnastics career
- Discipline: Women's artistic gymnastics
- Country represented: China
Medal record
Representing China
World Championships
Gold medal – first place	2026 Rotterdam	Team
Asian Championships
Gold medal – first place	2024 Tashkent	Team
Gold medal – first place	2024 Tashkent	Balance beam
Gold medal – first place	2025 Jecheon	Team
Gold medal – first place	2025 Jecheon	Uneven bars
Gold medal – first place	2026 Zunyi	Team
Silver medal – second place	2024 Tashkent	All-around
Bronze medal – third place	2025 Jecheon	All-around

Qin Xinyi (Chinese: 秦心怡, born 28 August 2008) is a Chinese artistic gymnast. She was the alternate for the gold medal-winning team at the 2026 World Championships. Qin is also a five-time gold medalist at the Asian Championships.

== Career ==
=== 2023 ===
At the 2023 Chinese Artistic Gymnastics Championships, Qin won bronze with the Shanghai team.

At the 2023 Asian Artistic Gymnastics Championships, she was part of the Chinese team that won silver in the team event. She also won silver on uneven bars.

=== 2024 ===
At the 2024 Asian Women's Artistic Gymnastics Championships, Qin was part of the Chinese team that won gold in the team event. Individually, she won silver in the all-around final. In the event finals, she won gold on balance beam and was seventh on floor.

=== 2025 ===
At the 2025 Chinese Artistic Gymnastics Championships, she won silver in the all-around.

At the 2025 Asian Women's Artistic Gymnastics Championships, she again was part of the Chinese team that won gold in the team event. Individually, she won bronze in the all-around final. In the event finals, she won gold on uneven bars and was seventh on floor.

=== 2026 ===
At the 2026 World Championships, Qin was the alternate for the Chinese team. They went on to win team gold, their first World team gold in twenty years. As the alternate, Qin was also awarded the gold medal.

== Competitive history ==
Competitive history of Qin Xinyi
Year	Event	Team	AA	VT	UB	BB	FX
2024	Asian Championships	1st place, gold medalist(s)	2nd place, silver medalist(s)			1st place, gold medalist(s)	
2025	Chinese Championships		2nd place, silver medalist(s)				
2025	Chinese National Games				3rd place, bronze medalist(s)		
2025	Asian Championships	1st place, gold medalist(s)	3rd place, bronze medalist(s)		1st place, gold medalist(s)		
2026	Asian Championships	1st place, gold medalist(s)					
2026	World Championships	(gold) (Note: Qin was the team alternate.)					
2026	Arthur Gander Memorial		11				
2026	Swiss Cup	5					
