= Alexander Artemev =

American artistic gymnast (born 1985)

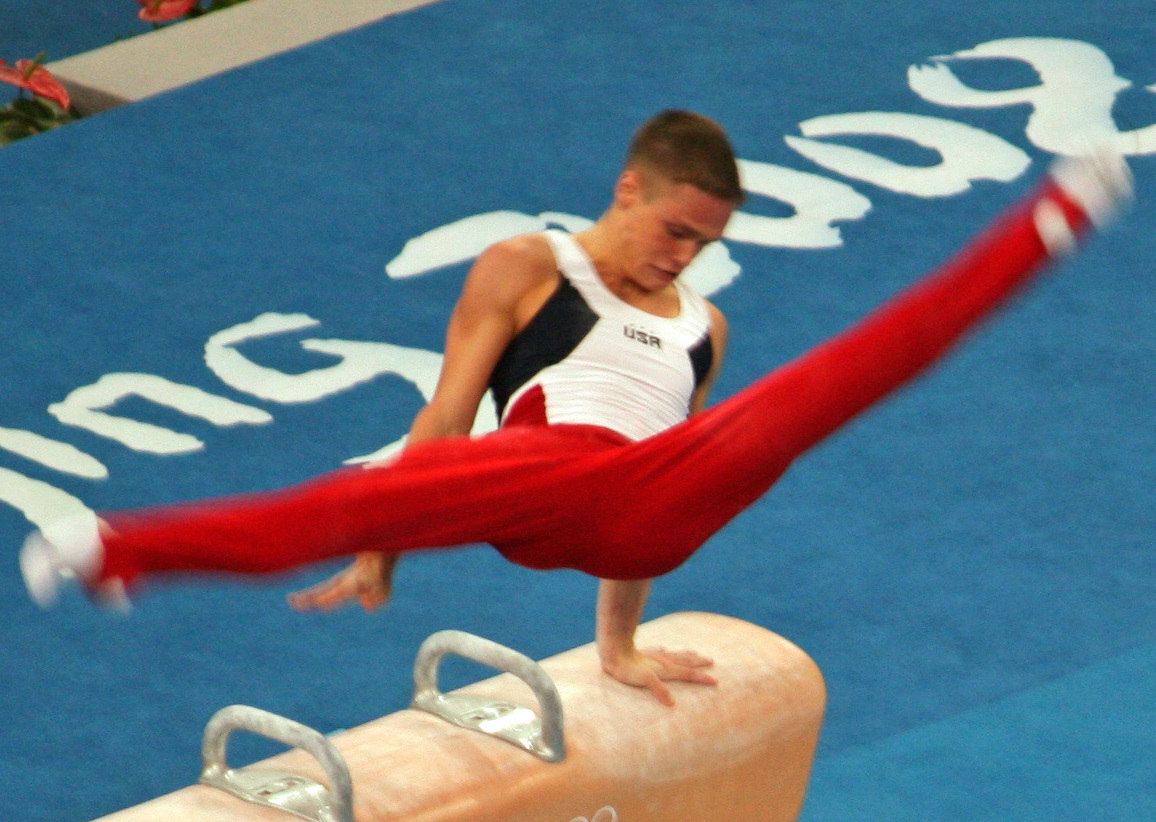
- Artemev at the 2008 Summer Olympics

Personal information
- Full name: Alexander Vladimirovich Artemev
- Alternative names: Aliaksandr Uladzimiravich Artsemeu; Аляксандр Уладзіміравіч Арцемеў
- Nickname: Sasha
- Born: August 29, 1985 (age 41) Minsk, Byelorussian SSR, Soviet Union
- Height: 1.68 m (5 ft 6 in)
- Relatives: Vladimir Artemev (father)

Gymnastics career
- Discipline: Men's artistic gymnastics
- Country represented: United States; (2003–2010)
- Gym: 5280 Gymnastics; Team Chevron; Team Gattaca; Gymnastika
- Head coach: Vladimir Artemev
- Retired: 2012
Medal record
Men's artistic gymnastics
Representing United States
Event	1st	2nd	3rd
Olympic Games	0	0	1
World Championships	0	0	1
Pacific Rim Championships	1	1	0
Total	1	1	2
Olympic Games
Bronze medal – third place	2008 Beijing	Team
World Championships
Bronze medal – third place	2006 Aarhus	Pommel horse
Pacific Rim Championships
Gold medal – first place	2008 San Jose	Team
Silver medal – second place	2008 San Jose	All-around

Alexander Vladimirovich Artemev (Note: Russian: Александр Владимирович Артемьев, romanized: Aleksandr Vladimirovich Artemyev; Belarusian: Аляксандр Уладзіміравіч Арцем’еў, romanized: Alyaksandr Uladzimiravich Artsyem’’yew) (born August 29, 1985, known by the diminutive Sasha) (Note: Russian: Саша Артемьев, romanized: Sasha Artemyev) is a retired American artistic gymnast. Artemev was a member of the United States men's national artistic gymnastics team and won an Olympic bronze medal at the 2008 Summer Olympics. He is the 2006 all-around U.S. national champion. Known for his ability on the pommel horse, he was the 2007 and 2008 U.S. national champion on the pommel horse and the bronze medalist in the event at the 2006 World Championships.

== Early life and education ==
Alexander Artemev, who goes by the Russian diminutive "Sasha", was born August 29, 1985, in Minsk, Belarusian SSR, Soviet Union. He is the only child of Svetlana and Vladimir Artemev. His parents are gymnastics coaches and former competitive gymnasts for the Soviet Union. His mother competed in rhythmic gymnastics while his father competed in artistic gymnastics. Vladimir was the 1982 USSR Cup all-around champion, whose own Olympic ambitions were dashed by the Soviet boycott of the 1984 Summer Olympics. By 1990, Svetlana moved to Chile to coach, leaving Vladimir a single dad.

Father and son came to the United States in 1994, becoming U.S. citizens in December 2002. Artemev attended McLain Community High School, graduating in 2003.

== Gymnastics career ==
Artemev won three titles at the 2006 U.S. National Championships in the all-around, pommel horse and parallel bars. He was the only American men's team member to win a medal at the 2006 World Championships, taking the bronze on the pommel horse. He became the first U.S. gymnast since Kurt Thomas in 1979 to win a world championship medal on pommel horse. At the 2007 U.S. Nationals he finished fourth in the all-around, behind champion David Durante, Guillermo Alvarez, and Sho Nakamori. At the competition, he became the first gymnast to land a triple-twisting Yurchenko vault.

At the 2008 U.S. Nationals, Artemev won the pommel horse title for the second consecutive year. After the U.S. Olympic Trials in June, he was named an alternate to the men's team for the 2008 Olympics. On August 7, he was added to the team, replacing injured Morgan Hamm.

Together with his teammates, Artemev won the bronze medal in men's team gymnastics in Beijing. Artemev's dazzling performance on the pommel horse, the last routine for the team, clinched the bronze medal for the U.S. team. Following the team competition, Artemev competed in the individual all-around, where he received the second highest pommel horse score with a 15.525. Artemev finished the all-around competition in 12th place behind fellow American Jonathan Horton, who placed ninth. Artemev qualified for the pommel horse individual finals in sixth position. He attempted a new routine that would raise his difficulty level. However, halfway through his routine, and just after completing a more difficult move, he fell on an easier move, resulting in an automatic 0.8 of a point deduction, which dropped his final score to 14.975 for seventh place.

In April 2009, Artemev injured two vertebrae in a car accident, but continued training to try to make the team for the 2009 World Championships. The injury forced him out of the 2009 U.S. National Championships in August, but USA Gymnastics still named him to the world team on the condition he could prove physical readiness before the competition. However, he was unable to sufficiently recover to attend the verification camp.

Artemev returned to competition in February 2010, competing in four events in qualification at the U.S. Winter Cup. At the end of 2010, he said he hoped to compete in all six events again the next season. In February 2011, he competed in three events at the U.S. Winter Cup but did not advance to the second day's finals.

Artemev did not compete again for the rest of the Olympic cycle. In 2012, he said he would decide after the London Olympic Games whether or not to make a comeback for the 2016 Olympics, but he eventually retired.

== Personal life ==
He married University of Denver gymnast Brianna Springer in the summer of 2009, but the couple divorced in 2011.

He currently coaches, alongside his father, at 5280 Gymnastics in Colorado. One of their top gymnasts, Yul Moldauer, was the 2014 U.S. junior national champion on pommel horse, 2017 national champion, and 2020 Olympic team member.
