= Rina Kishi =

Japanese artistic gymnast (born 2007)

- 岸 里奈
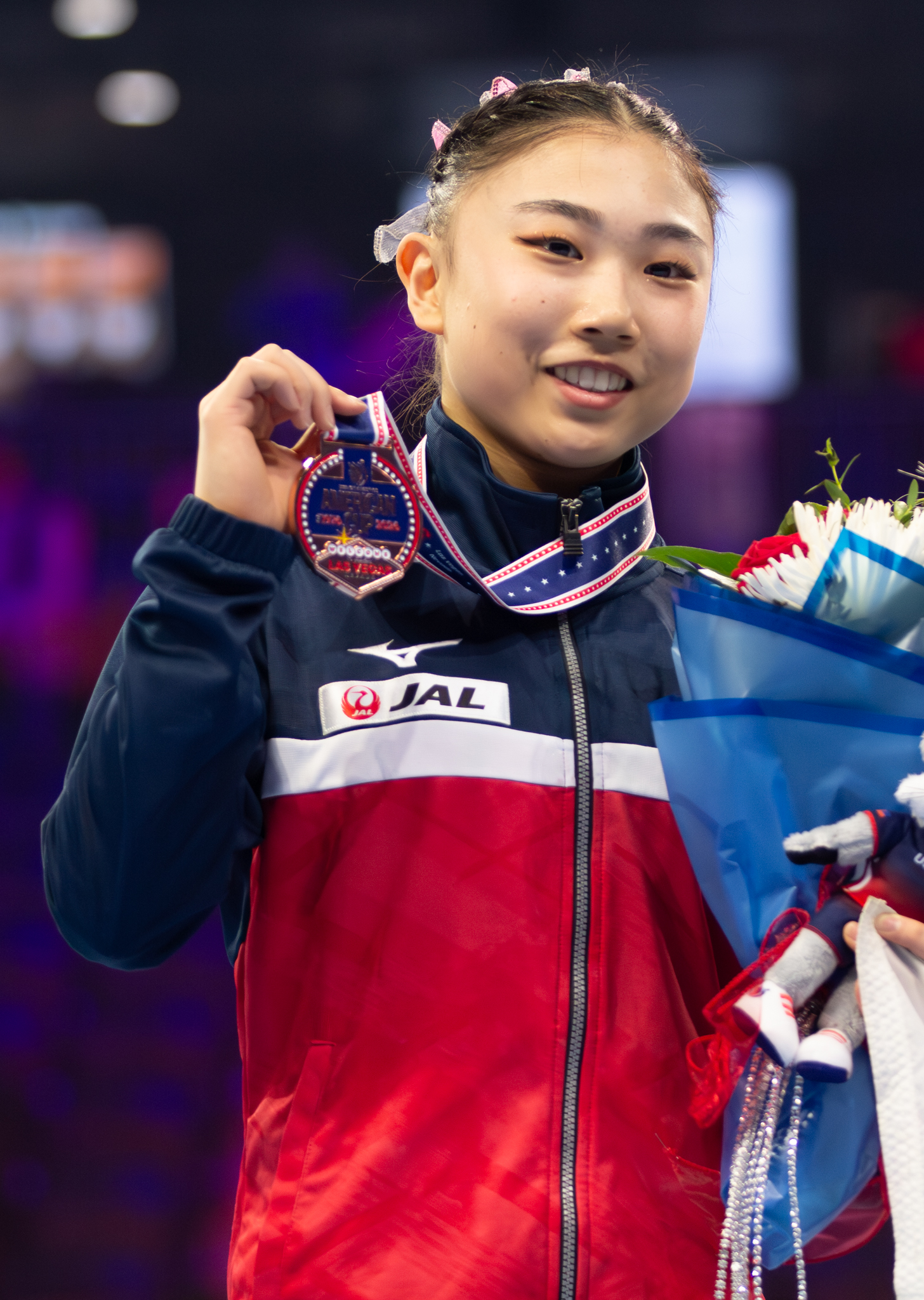
- Kishi at the 2026 American Cup

Personal information
- Born: 23 September 2007 (age 19) Toda, Saitama
- Height: 147 cm (4 ft 10 in)

Gymnastics career
- Discipline: Women's artistic gymnastics
- Country represented: Japan; (2023–present)
- Club: Toda City Sports Centre
- Head coach: Risa Toyoshima
Medal record
Women's artistic gymnastics
Representing Japan
World Championships
Bronze medal – third place	2026 Rotterdam	Team
Asian Games
Silver medal – second place	2026 Aichi-Nagoya	Team
Asian Championships
Silver medal – second place	2025 Jecheon	Team
Silver medal – second place	2026 Zunyi	Team
FIG World Cup
Event / 1st / 2nd / 3rd; Apparatus World Cup / 1 / 0 / 0

Rina Kishi (Japanese: 岸 里奈; born 23 September 2007) is a Japanese artistic gymnast. She was part of the bronze medal-winning team at the 2026 World Championships. Kishi represented Japan at the 2024 Summer Olympics.

== Career ==
Kishi began gymnastics when she was three years old. As a junior, she competed on the balance beam at the 2019 All-Japan Team Championships and helped her club place 10th. In 2022, at her first All-Japan Championships, Kishi placed 11th in the all-around, and she finished 12th at the NHK Trophy.

Kishi became age-eligible for senior international competitions in 2023. She won the bronze medal in the all-around at the 2023 All-Japan Championships. She then placed second in the all-around at the 2023 NHK Trophy and was selected to make her international debut at the 2023 World Championships. While there, she helped Japan secure an Olympic berth with an eighth-place finish. Individually, Kishi qualified for the all-around final and finished in 11th place. After the World Championships, she competed at the 2023 All-Japan Team Championships and helped her club place sixth while earning the highest score in the all-around.

Kishi began the 2024 season with a second-place finish at the All-Japan Championships. She then finished second in the all-around to Shoko Miyata at the 2024 NHK Trophy and was selected for the Olympic team alongside Miyata, Haruka Nakamura, Mana Okamura, and Kohane Ushioku. At the 2024 Olympics, Kishi placed 8th with the Japanese team. She also qualified for the all-around final, finishing in 11th place, and the floor exercise final, finishing in 7th place.

At the 2025 Asian Championships, Kishi competed for Japan along with teammates Aiko Sugihara, Saki Kawakami, and Haruka Nakamura. They won the silver medal as a team. As an individual, Kishi qualified for and competed in the uneven bars final, finishing in fourth place.

Kishi represented Japan at the 2025 World Gymnastics Championships in Jakarta, Indonesia. She qualified for the all-around final, where she finished in 6th place. She also competed in the floor exercise final and secured a 5th place finish.

In October 2026, she competed at the 2026 World Artistic Gymnastics Championships, and won a bronze medal in the team event. This was the first medal for Japan's women's team at the Artistic Gymnastics World Championships since 1966.

== Competitive history ==
Competitive history of Rina Kishi
Year	Event	Team	AA	VT	UB	BB	FX
2019	All-Japan Team Championships	10					
2022	All-Japan Championships		11	3rd place, bronze medalist(s)			
2022	NHK Trophy		12	2nd place, silver medalist(s)			
2023	All-Japan Championships		3rd place, bronze medalist(s)	1st place, gold medalist(s)			1st place, gold medalist(s)
2023	NHK Trophy		2nd place, silver medalist(s)	1st place, gold medalist(s)	3rd place, bronze medalist(s)		2nd place, silver medalist(s)
2023	World Championships	8	11				
2023	All-Japan Team Championships	1st place, gold medalist(s)	6	2nd place, silver medalist(s)	2nd place, silver medalist(s)		1st place, gold medalist(s)
2024	All-Japan Championships		2nd place, silver medalist(s)	3rd place, bronze medalist(s)			2nd place, silver medalist(s)
2024	NHK Trophy		2nd place, silver medalist(s)				
2024	Olympic Games	8	11				7
2025	Baku World Cup					4	1st place, gold medalist(s)
2025	NHK Trophy		2nd place, silver medalist(s)				
2025	Asian Championships	2nd place, silver medalist(s)			4		
2025	World Championships	—N/a	6				5
2026	American Cup	3rd place, bronze medalist(s)					
2026	NHK Trophy		2nd place, silver medalist(s)				
2026	Asian Championships	2nd place, silver medalist(s)	4				
2026	Asian Games	2nd place, silver medalist(s)					
2026	World Championships	3rd place, bronze medalist(s)	15				
