= Yang Fanyuwei =

Chinese gymnast

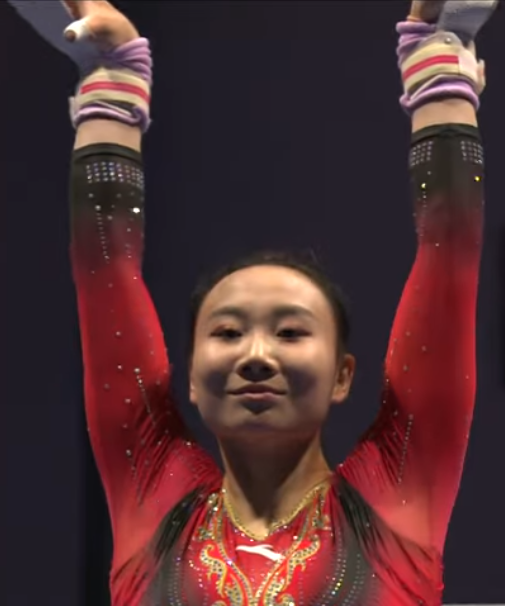
- Yang at the 2025 World University Games

Personal information
- Born: 27 February 2005 (age 21) Yunnan, China
- Height: 1.68 m (5 ft 6 in)

Gymnastics career
- Discipline: Women's artistic gymnastics
- Country represented: China
- Head coach: Xu Jinglei
Medal record
Representing China
Women's artistic gymnastics
World Championships
Bronze medal – third place	2025 Jakarta	Uneven bars
Asian Championships
Gold medal – first place	2024 Tashkent	Team
Gold medal – first place	2024 Tashkent	Uneven bars
World University Games
Gold medal – first place	2025 Rhine-Ruhr	Uneven bars
FIG World Cup
Event / 1st / 2nd / 3rd; World Cup / 3 / 0 / 0

Yang Fanyuwei (Chinese: 杨凡予微; born 27 February 2005) is a Chinese artistic gymnast. She is primarily an uneven bars specialist and is the 2025 World bronze medalist and the 2024 Asian champion on that apparatus. She is also the 2025 Chinese and 2025 World University Games uneven bars champion.

== Gymnastics career ==
Yang won the uneven bars bronze medal at the 2020 Chinese Junior Championships in the under-15 age category.

Yang made her international debut at the 2024 Antalya World Challenge Cup and advanced into the uneven bars final, finishing seventh. At the 2024 Asian Championships in Tashkent, she helped China win the team title, and she also won the uneven bars title by over a full point.

At the 2025 Antalya World Cup, Yang won the gold medal and also successfully performed a Jaeger with a full twist for the first time. She won another gold medal at the Osijek World Cup, and she won the Chinese national title on the uneven bars. At the 2025 World University Games, she won the uneven bars gold medal with a score of 15.000, over a full point ahead of the silver medalist and the second-highest international uneven bars score of the year.

After winning the uneven bars at the Chinese Worlds Trials, Yang was selected to represent China on uneven bars at the 2025 World Championships in Jakarta, Indonesia, where she qualified for the apparatus final in second place. She went on to win the bronze medal behind Kaylia Nemour and Angelina Melnikova.

== Eponymous skill ==
Yang has an uneven bars release move named after her in the Code of Points. She first completed the skill during the qualification round at the 2025 Antalya World Cup.

Apparatus	Name	Description	Difficulty (Note: Valid for the 2025–2028 Code of Points)	Added to the Code of Points
Uneven bars	Yang	Jaeger salto stretched with 1/1 turn (360°) to hang on high bar	G (0.7)	2025 Antalya World Cup
