= Haruka Nakamura =

Japanese artistic gymnast (born 2008)

- 中村 遥香
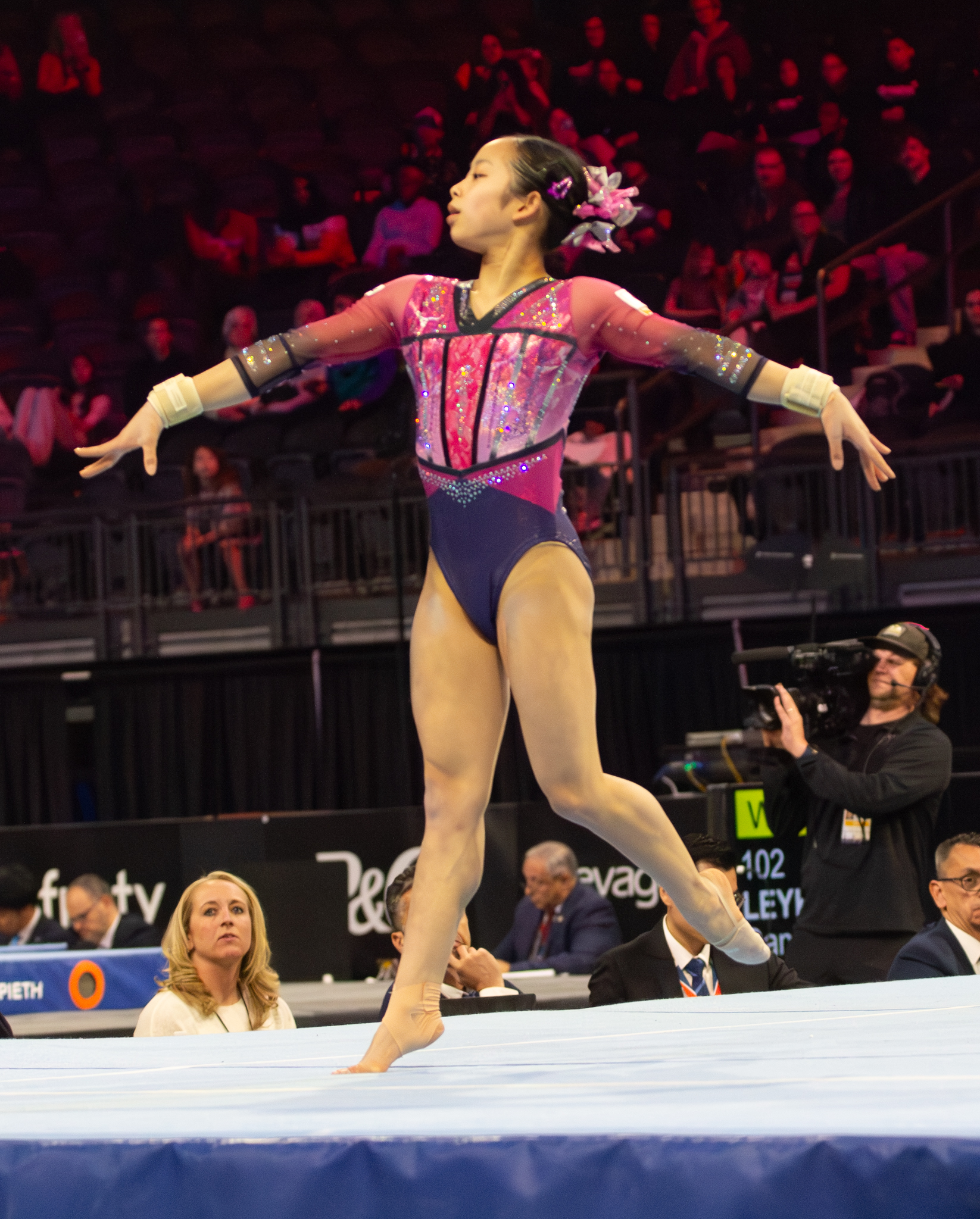
- Nakamura at the 2026 American Cup

Personal information
- Nickname: Haru
- Born: 18 May 2008 (age 18) Osaka, Japan

Gymnastics career
- Discipline: Women's artistic gymnastics
- Country represented: Japan
- Club: Namba Gymnastics Club
- Head coaches: Takayuki Yamazaki, Miki Shimomura
- Eponymous skills: Nakamura (D): Piked Deltchev (Uneven bars)
Medal record
Representing Japan
World Championships
Bronze medal – third place	2026 Rotterdam	Team
Asian Games
Silver medal – second place	2026 Aichi-Nagoya	Team
Asian Championships
Silver medal – second place	2025 Jecheon	Team
Silver medal – second place	2025 Jecheon	All-around
Silver medal – second place	2025 Jecheon	Uneven bars
Bronze medal – third place	2025 Jecheon	Floor exercise
Junior World Championships
Gold medal – first place	2023 Antalya	Team
Gold medal – first place	2023 Antalya	All-around
Bronze medal – third place	2023 Antalya	Floor exercise
FIG World Cup
Event / 1st / 2nd / 3rd; Apparatus World Cup / 1 / 0 / 1

Haruka Nakamura (Japanese: 中村 遥香; born 18 May 2008) is a Japanese artistic gymnast. She was part of the bronze medal-winning team at the 2026 World Championships. Additionally, Nakamura was the 2023 Junior World all-around and team champion. She represented Japan at the 2024 Summer Olympics.

== Junior gymnastics career ==
Nakamura helped the Namba Gymnastics Club place ninth in the all-around at the 2021 All-Japan Team Championships, and she had the tenth-highest all-around score. She competed at the 2022 All-Japan Championships where she finished 50th all-around in the qualification round. Then at the 2022 All-Japan Event Championships, she placed seventh on the uneven bars and fifth on the balance beam. In December 2022, Japan hosted its Japanese Junior Worlds Trials, and Nakamura finished third in the all-around. She helped her club place eighth at the 2022 All-Japan Team Championships.

Nakamura made her international debut at the 2023 WOGA Classic in Frisco, Texas. She won the silver medal in the all-around by only 0.150 behind American gymnast Zoey Molomo. She was selected to compete at the 2023 Junior World Championships in Antalya, Turkey. The Japanese team of Nakamura, Mika Mizuno, and Sara Yamaguchi won the gold medal by over two points ahead of the United States. The team competition also served as the qualification round, and she qualified in third place for the all-around final and also qualified for the uneven bars and floor exercise finals. In the all-around final, Nakamura hit all four of her routines to capture the gold medal ahead of her teammate Yamaguchi with a total score of 51.765. She fell in the uneven bars final but still managed to finish in fourth place. She then won a bronze medal in the floor exercise final behind Giulia Perotti and Hezly Rivera.

Nakamura competed at the senior level at the 2023 All-Japan Championships and finished eighth in the all-around. She also finished eighth in the all-around at the NHK Trophy. Then at the 2023 Junior Asian Championships in Singapore. She led the Japanese team to the gold medal, and she won the all-around title by over a full point. In the event finals, she won gold medals on both the uneven bars and the floor exercise. She then helped her club finish in fifth place at the All-Japan Team Championships.

== Senior gymnastics career ==
=== 2024 ===
Nakamura became age-eligible for senior international competitions in 2024. She made her senior debut at the 2024 Cottbus World Cup and won the bronze medal on the balance beam. She then won the bronze medal in the all-around at the All-Japan Championships. She once again finished third in the all-around at the NHK Trophy and was selected for the Japanese Olympic team alongside Shoko Miyata, Rina Kishi, Mana Okamura, and Kohane Ushioku.

=== 2025 ===
In March, Nakamura competed at the Baku World Cup, performing on uneven bars and balance beam. She qualified for both event finals, finishing seventh on uneven bars and winning the gold medal on beam. The following month, she competed at the All-Japan Championships, placing fifth in the all-around and third on balance beam. At the NHK Trophy in May, Nakamura finished in fourth place in the all-around and won the gold medal on uneven bars.

Nakamura represented Japan at the 2025 Asian Gymnastics Championships, alongside teammates Saki Kawakami, Rina Kishi, and Aiko Sugihara. They won the silver medal as a team. Individually, Nakamura won the silver medal in the all-around, the silver medal on uneven bars, and the bronze medal on floor exercise. She also qualified for the balance beam final and secured a fourth place finish.

In October, Nakamura competed at the 2025 World Gymnastics Championships. During qualifications, she competed only on uneven bars, finishing fifteenth overall.

=== 2026 ===
Nakamura competed at the 2026 American Cup where she helped Japan win bronze. At the NHK Trophy she finished fourteenth in the all-around. Despite this low finish, she was named to the team to represent Japan at the 2026 World Championships based on her team contribution score. In September, Nakamura competed as part of the silver medal-winning Japanese team at the 2026 Asian Games.

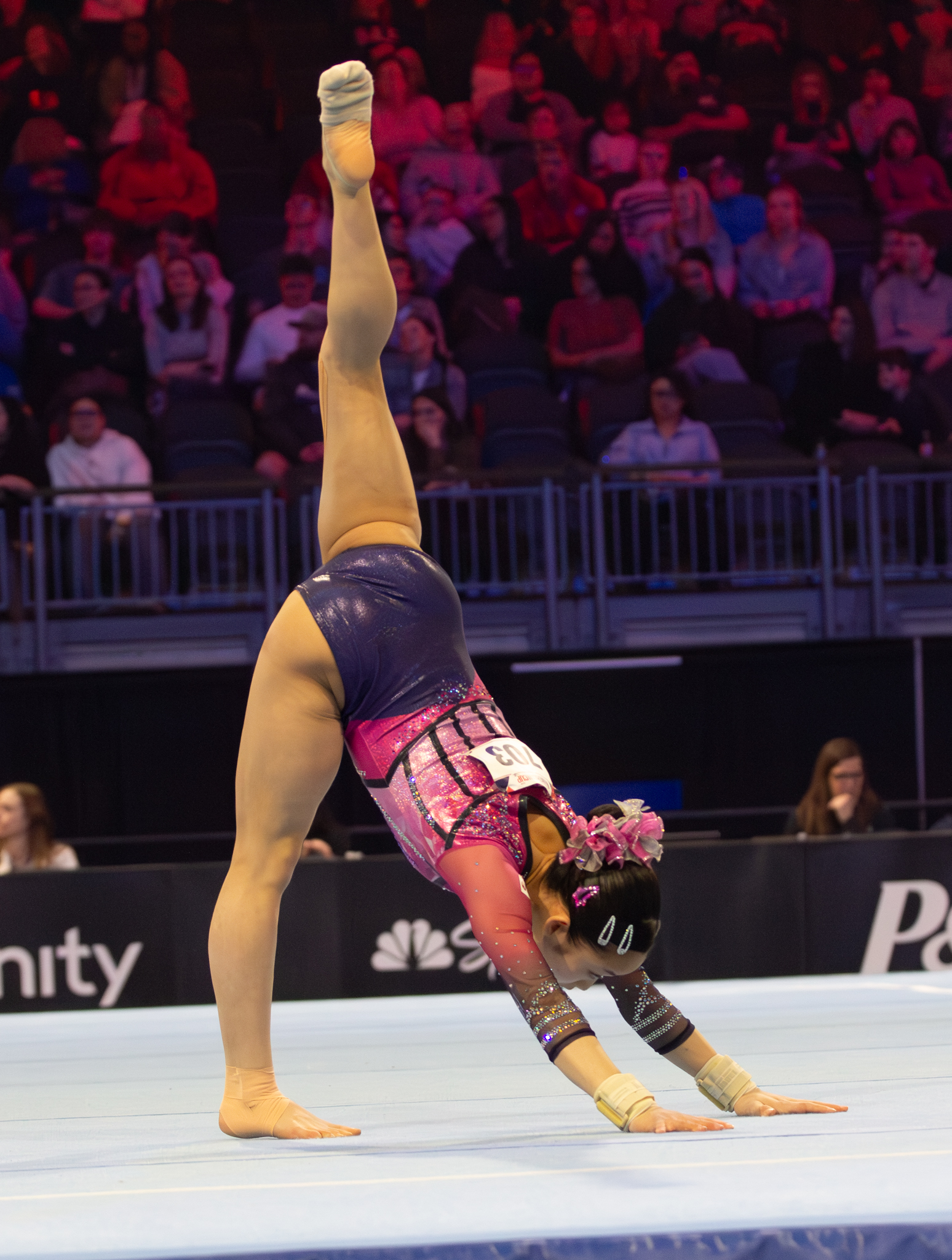
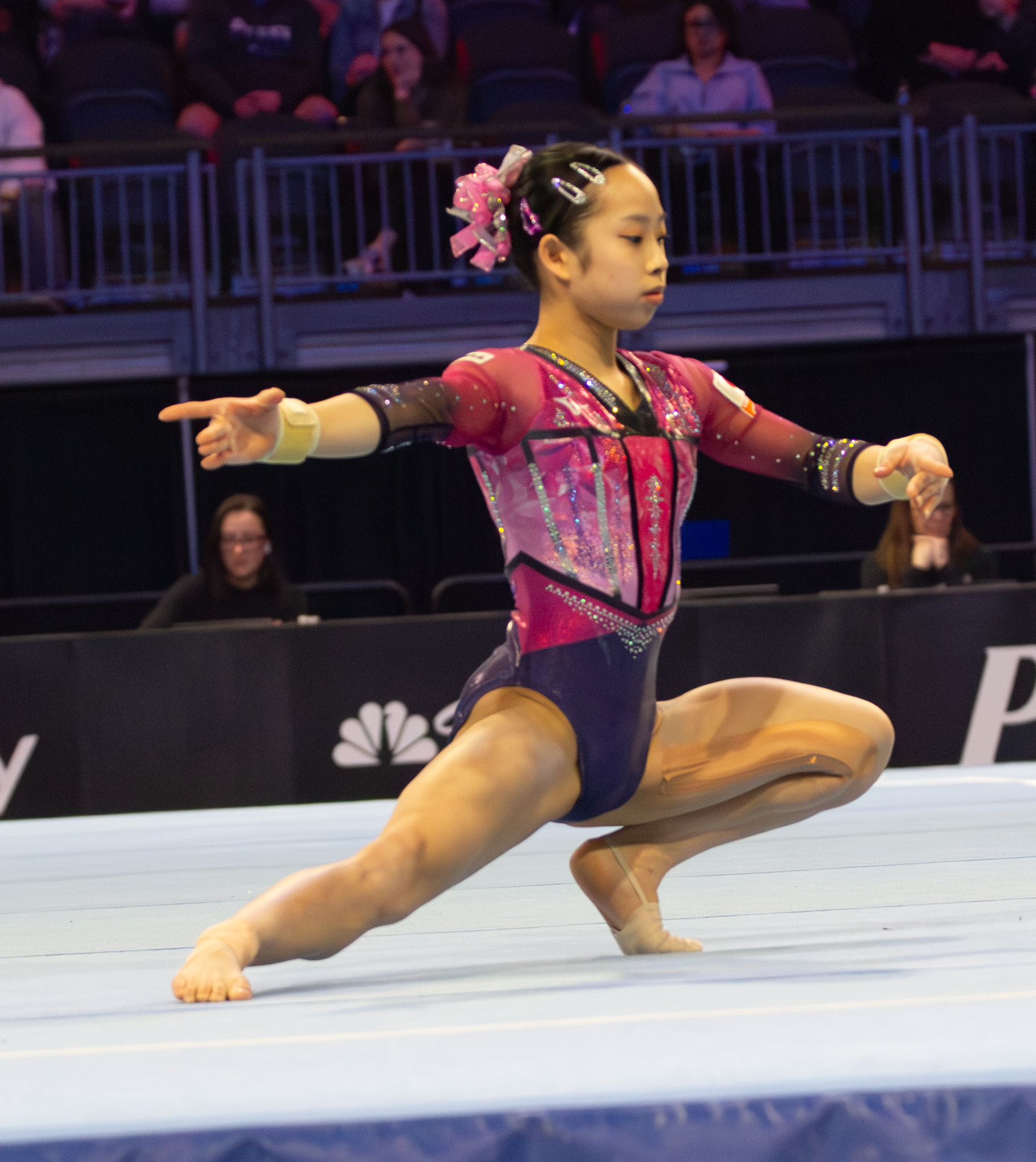
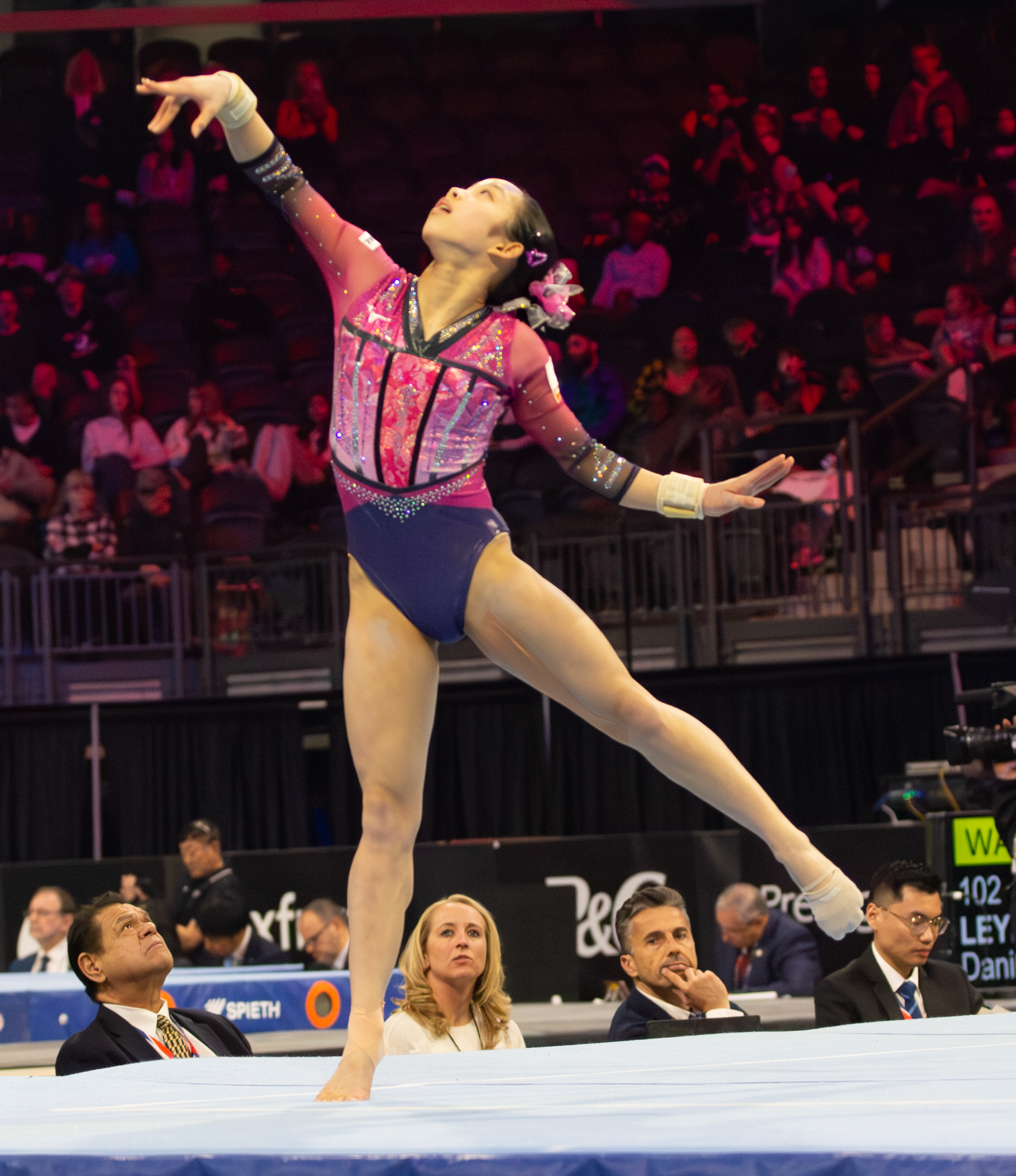
Nakamura at the 2026 American Cup

Alongside teammates Aiko Sugihara, Rina Kishi, Mana Okamura, Sara Yamaguchi, and Misa Nishiyama, Nakamura won team bronze for Japan at the 2026 World Championships. This was the first medal for Japan's women's team since 1966.

== Eponymous skill ==
Nakamura performs a piked Deltchev (1/2 turn into a forward salto in straddled position) on the uneven bars and has the skill named after her in the Code of Points.

Apparatus	Name	Description	Difficulty (Note: Valid for the 2025–2028 Code of Points)	Added to Code of Points
Uneven bars	Moreno-Nakamura	Swing forward with half turn (180 degrees) and salto forward piked (Note: Also referred to as a piked Deltchev)	D (0.4)	2023 Junior World Championships

== Competitive history ==
Competitive history of Haruka Nakamura at the junior level
Year	Event	Team	AA	VT	UB	BB	FX
2021	All-Japan Team Championships	9	10				
2022	All-Japan Championships		50				
2022	All-Japan Event Championships				7	5	
2022	Junior Worlds Trials		3rd place, bronze medalist(s)		1st place, gold medalist(s)	2nd place, silver medalist(s)	
2022	All-Japan Team Championships	8					
2023	WOGA Classic		2nd place, silver medalist(s)		1st place, gold medalist(s)	1st place, gold medalist(s)	2nd place, silver medalist(s)
2023	Junior World Championships	1st place, gold medalist(s)	1st place, gold medalist(s)		4		3rd place, bronze medalist(s)
2023	All-Japan Championships		8				
2023	NHK Trophy		8				
2023	Asian Championships	1st place, gold medalist(s)	1st place, gold medalist(s)	7	1st place, gold medalist(s)		1st place, gold medalist(s)
2023	All-Japan Team Championships	5			1st place, gold medalist(s)	3rd place, bronze medalist(s)	

Competitive history of Haruka Nakamura at the senior level
Year	Event	Team	AA	VT	UB	BB	FX
2024	Cottbus World Cup					3rd place, bronze medalist(s)	
2024	All-Japan Championships		3rd place, bronze medalist(s)			3rd place, bronze medalist(s)	
2024	NHK Trophy		3rd place, bronze medalist(s)				
2024	Olympic Games	8	15				
2025	Baku World Cup				7	1st place, gold medalist(s)	
2025	NHK Trophy		4				
2025	Asian Championships	2nd place, silver medalist(s)	2nd place, silver medalist(s)		2nd place, silver medalist(s)	4	3rd place, bronze medalist(s)
2025	World Championships				15		
2026	American Cup	3rd place, bronze medalist(s)					
2026	NHK Trophy		14				
2026	Asian Games	2nd place, silver medalist(s)					
2026	World Championships	3rd place, bronze medalist(s)					
