= Vladimir Artemev =

Belarusian artistic gymnast (born 1960)

- Владимир Артемьев
- Nickname: Vlad
- Born: 1960 (age 65–66) Belarusian SSR, Soviet Union

Gymnastics career
- Discipline: Men's artistic gymnastics
- Country represented: Soviet Union; (1977–1987)

Vladimir Artemev (Russian: Владимир Артемьев; born 1960) is a retired Belarusian artistic gymnast who competed for the Soviet Union. He was a member of the Soviet national team from 1977 through 1987 and was the Soviet national all-around champion in 1982 and 1984. He was unable to compete at the 1984 Summer Olympics due to the Soviet boycott.

He is the father and coach of American gymnast Alexander Artemev. They moved to the United States in 1994 and became US citizens in 2002.
