= 2013 Voronin Cup =

Mikhail Voronin Cup
- Location: Moscow, Russia
- Date: December 2–4, 2013

The 2013 Mikhail Voronin Cup took place on December 2–4 in Moscow, Russia.

== Medal winners ==
Event	Gold	Silver	Bronze
Team all-around	Russia	Azerbaijan	Russia (Dynamo)
Senior
Individual all-around	Olena Vasilieva (UKR)	Anna Pavlova (AZE)	Marina Nekrasova (AZE)
Vault	Anna Pavlova (AZE)	Olena Vasilieva (UKR)	Valerija Grisane (LAT)
Uneven Bars	Olena Vasilieva (UKR)	Anna Pavlova (AZE)	Anastasiya Yekimenka (BLR)
Balance Beam	Olena Vasilieva (UKR)	Marina Nekrasova (AZE)	Anna Pavlova (AZE)
Floor Exercise	Valerija Grisane (LAT)	Anastasia Kadysheva (RUS)	Anna Pavlova (AZE)
Junior
Individual all-around	Daria Mikhailova (RUS)	Kristina Yaroshenko (RUS)	Anastasia Belkova (UZB)
Vault	Veronika Orlova (UZB)	Daria Mikhailova (RUS)	Polina Spirina (RUS)
Uneven Bars	Alexandra Yazydzhyan (RUS)	Natalia Kapitonova (RUS)	Alisa Zadvornaya (UKR)
Balance Beam	Raisa Batyrova (RUS)	Yana Gorokhova (UKR)	Daria Mikhailova (RUS)
Floor Exercise	Daria Mikhailova (RUS)	Anastasia Belkova (UZB)	Veronika Orlova (UZB)
