= Tian Zhuofan =

Chinese gymnast

- 田倬凡
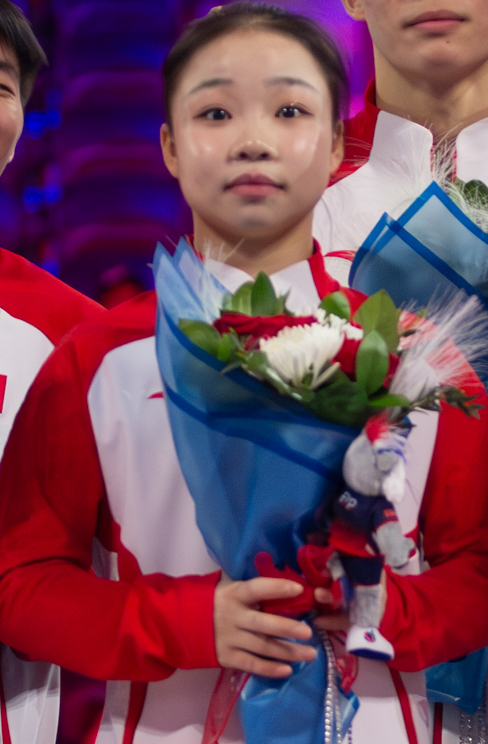
- Tian at the 2026 American Cup

Personal information
- Born: 28 November 2008 (age 17) Hunan, China

Gymnastics career
- Discipline: Women's artistic gymnastics
- Country represented: China
Medal record
Representing China
Women's artistic gymnastics
World Championships
FIG World Cup
Event	1st	2nd	3rd
World Cup	0	0	3

Tian Zhuofan (Chinese: 田倬凡, born 28 November 2008) is a Chinese artistic gymnast.

== Career ==
=== Junior ===
==== 2023 ====
In June at the 2023 Asian Artistic Gymnastics Championships, she was part of the junior Chinese team that won silver behind Japan. Individually, she won silver in the all-around and gold on balance beam.

=== Senior ===
==== 2025 ====
In March, she won two bronze medals – on uneven bars and on balance beam – at the World Cup event in Antaliya.

==== 2026 ====
In March at the 2026 American Cup, she was part of the mixed-gender Chinese team that won gold – ahead of the United States and Japan.

In April, she won bronze on balance beam at the World Cup event in Osijek.
