= Aleksandra Shevchenko =

- Олександра Шевченко
- Born: Aleksandra Fedorivna Shevchenko; 16 April 1926
- Died: December 2000 (age 74)
- Occupations: Scientist-zootechnician; Milkmaid; Agronomist
- Years active: 1944–1992
- Awards: Hero of Socialist Labour; Order of Lenin (x3); Order of the October Revolution; Medal "For Labour Valour"

Aleksandra Fedorivna Shevchenko (Ukrainian: Олександра Федорівна Шевченко; 16 April 1926 – December 2000) was a Ukrainian scientist-zootechnician and milkmaid. She worked on the "Memory of Lenin" collective farm, the Rzhyshchiv Machine and Tractor Station and the Dimitrov collective farm (later the Dnepr collective farm). Shevchenko was an elected deputy of the Supreme Soviet of the Ukrainian Soviet Socialist Republic and a candidate member of the Central Committee of the Communist Party of the Soviet Union. She was awarded three Orders of Lenin, the Medal "For Labour Valour", the Order of the October Revolution and the title of Hero of Socialist Labour.

== Biography ==
Shevchenko was born into a family of farmers in the village of Verhuny, Cherkasy Okruha, Ukrainian Soviet Socialist Republic on 16 April 1926. Starting in 1944, she began working on farms in the Cherkasy and Kyiv oblasts. Shevchenko worked on the "Memory of Lenin" collective farm, Cherkasy District as a team leader between 1944 and 1950. She graduated from the Kyiv Secondary Agricultural School with an agronomy degree in 1953. Shevchenko worked as an agronomist at the Rzhyshchiv Machine and Tractor Station (MTS), Kyiv Oblast from 1953 to 1955.

Between 1955 and 1958, she was an agronomist at the Dimitrov collective farm (later the Dnepr collective farm), Rzhyshchiv Volost. From 1958 to 1959, Shevchenko was secretary of the executive committee of the Strizhovsky Village Council of workers' deputies in the Rzhyshchiv Volost. She began working at the Buchansky state farm, Kyiv-Sviatoshyn Raion as a milkmaid in November 1959. Shevechenko stopped working as a milkmaid at the farm in 1967. She was appointed livestock specialist at the farm and worked in the role from 1967 to 1968. From 1968 to 1981, Shevechenko was head of the farm's livestock workshop. She graduated from the Faculty of Animal Science of the Ukrainian Agricultural Academy in 1969.

Shevchenko joined the Communist Party of the Soviet Union in 1954. She was a delegate to the Congress of the Communist Party of the Soviet Union (22nd, 23rd, 24th, 25th and 26th) from 1961 to 1981. Shevchenko was an elected deputy of the sixth, seventh, eighth and ninth convocations of the Supreme Soviet of the Ukrainian Soviet Socialist Republic between 1963 and 1979. She was a candidate member of the Central Committee of the Communist Party of the Soviet Union from 1966 to 1981. Shevchenko died in December 2000.

== Recognition ==
She was presented with the Order of Lenin on 22 June 1948 and 24 June 1949 and the Medal "For Labour Valour" on 26 April 1963. Shevchenko was conferred the title of Hero of Socialist Labour with the Order of Lenin and the "Hammer and Sickle" gold medal by the Presidium of the Supreme Soviet of the Soviet Union on 22 March 1966. She was awarded the Order of the October Revolution on 8 April 1971.
