= Daniel Marinov =

Russian artistic gymnast

- Даниел Маринов
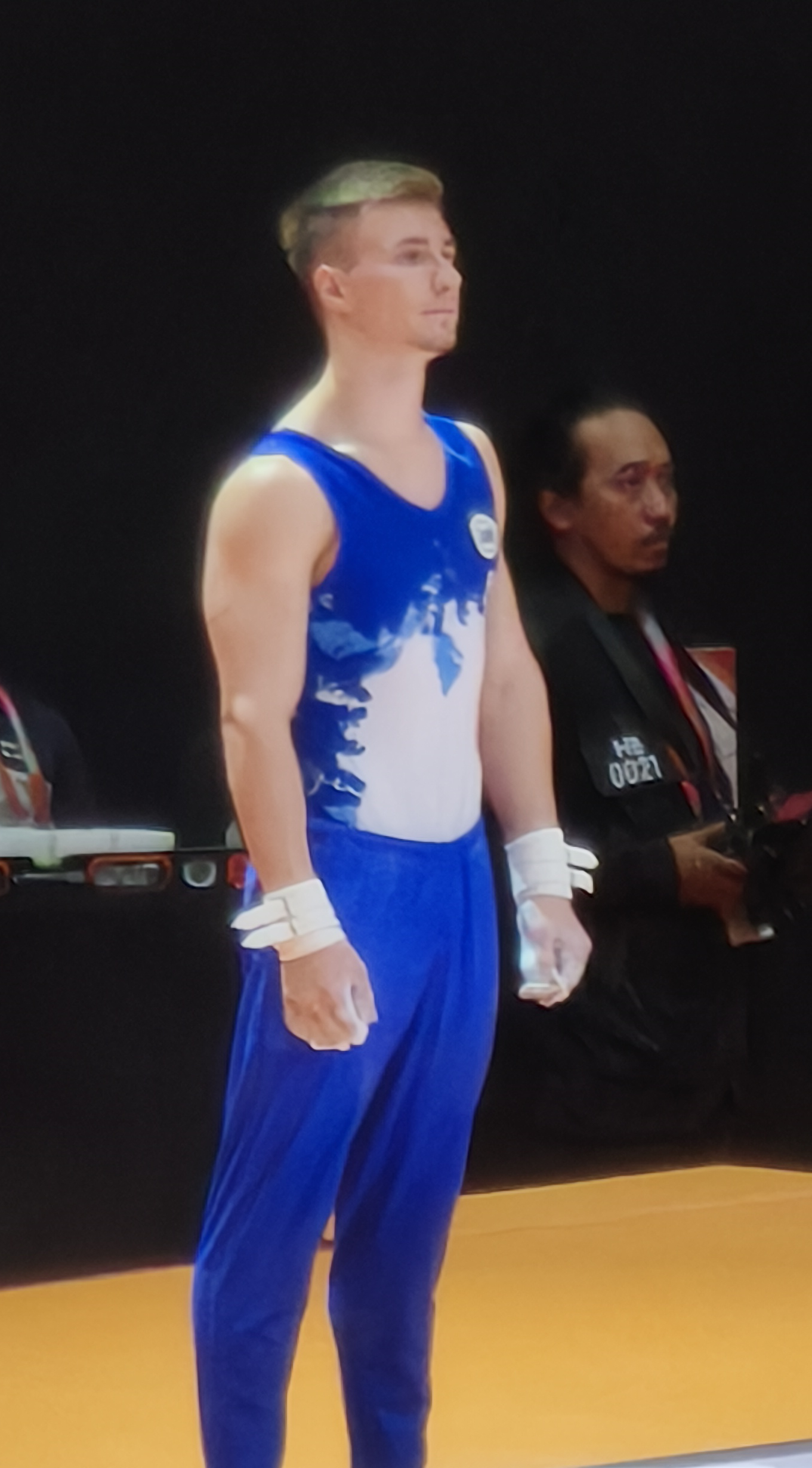
- Marinov at the 2025 World Championships

Personal information
- Full name: Daniel Nenkov Marinov
- Born: 17 December 2004 (age 21) Sofia, Bulgaria

Gymnastics career
- Discipline: Men's artistic gymnastics
- Country represented: Russia
Medal record
Representing Russia & (Individual Neutral Athletes) AIN
World Championships
Silver medal – second place	2026 Rotterdam	Team
Bronze medal – third place	2025 Jakarta	Parallel bars
Bronze medal – third place	2026 Rotterdam	Parallel bars
European Championships
Silver medal – second place	2026 Zagreb	Team
Bronze medal – third place	2026 Zagreb	All-around

Daniel Nenkov Marinov (Даниел Ненков Маринов; born 17 December 2004) is a Russian artistic gymnast. He was part of the silver medal-winning teams at the 2026 World Championships and 2026 European Championships. Individually he is a two-time World bronze medalist on the parallel bars (2025, 2026) and is the 2026 European all-around bronze medalist.

== Early life ==
Marinov was born on 17 December 2004 in Sofia, Bulgaria, to a Bulgarian father and a Russian mother. He moved to Kazan, Russia, with his mother as a child and is a dual citizen of both countries. He started gymnastics at six years old.

== Gymnastics career ==
Marinov competed at his first senior-level Russian Championships in 2022 and won the horizontal bar title.

At the 2024 BRICS Games, Marinov competed against international gymnasts for the first time and won the all-around competition, ahead of Olympic champion Artur Dalaloyan. He then won another gold medal in the parallel bars final. He also won silver medals on the vault and horizontal bar and won a bronze medal on the rings.

Marinov was approved by the International Gymnastics Federation to compete internationally as an Authorised Neutral Athlete in 2025. He won the all-around title at the 2025 Russian Championships. In the apparatus finals, he also won the floor exercise and parallel bars titles and won a bronze medal on the vault. At the 2025 World Championships, he advanced into the all-around final and finished seventh. He then won the bronze medal in the parallel bars final, behind China's Zou Jingyuan and Japan's Tomoharu Tsunogai. Additionally, he placed seventh in the vault final and eighth in the horizontal bar final.

Marniov competed at the 2026 European Championships alongside Mukhammadzhon Iakubov, Arsenii Dukhno, Savelii Sieedin, and Ilia Zaika. On the first day of competition, Marinov helped Russia (competing as World Gymnastics 2) qualify to the team final in first place and individually he won bronze in the all-around behind Illia Kovtun and Dukhno.

Marniov was selected to represent Russia at the 2026 World Championships alongside Dukhno, Sergei Naidin, Sieedin, and Zaika. The entire Russian delegation ran into visa issues as the Netherlands had not granted them prior to their initial scheduled departure date. On October 12, five days before the official competition start date, Dukhno, Naidin, and women's team member Alena Glotova were granted visas. As a Bulgarian citizen, Marniov was able to travel to the Netherlands with them using his Bulgarian passport. The rest of the men's team were granted visas but were not able to travel the Netherlands in time for podium training. During the qualification round, Marinov helped Russia qualify to the team final and individually he qualified to the all-around and parallel bars finals. During the team final, he performed on four of the six apparatuses, helping Russia win the silver medal and qualifying them a whole team to the 2028 Summer Olympics.

== Competitive history ==
Competitive history of Daniel Marinov
Year	Event	Team	AA	FX	PH	SR	VT	PB	HB
2022	Russian Championships	2nd place, silver medalist(s)	5	3rd place, bronze medalist(s)		5	8		1st place, gold medalist(s)
2022	Russian Cup		2nd place, silver medalist(s)	2nd place, silver medalist(s)	3rd place, bronze medalist(s)		2nd place, silver medalist(s)	1st place, gold medalist(s)	6
2022	Spartakiade	3rd place, bronze medalist(s)	3rd place, bronze medalist(s)	2nd place, silver medalist(s)	6		3rd place, bronze medalist(s)	1st place, gold medalist(s)	
2022	Mogilev Friendly		1st place, gold medalist(s)						
2022	Voronin Cup		1st place, gold medalist(s)						
2023	Russian Championships	3rd place, bronze medalist(s)	1st place, gold medalist(s)	2nd place, silver medalist(s)	3rd place, bronze medalist(s)	4	3rd place, bronze medalist(s)	4	3rd place, bronze medalist(s)
2023	Belarus Open Cup	2nd place, silver medalist(s)	1st place, gold medalist(s)	1st place, gold medalist(s)		6	4	1st place, gold medalist(s)	6
2023	Russian Cup		1st place, gold medalist(s)		2nd place, silver medalist(s)	2nd place, silver medalist(s)	1st place, gold medalist(s)		
2024	Russian Championships	3rd place, bronze medalist(s)	1st place, gold medalist(s)	1st place, gold medalist(s)			4	2nd place, silver medalist(s)	2nd place, silver medalist(s)
2024	BRICS Games		1st place, gold medalist(s)			3rd place, bronze medalist(s)	2nd place, silver medalist(s)	1st place, gold medalist(s)	2nd place, silver medalist(s)
2024	Russian Cup		1st place, gold medalist(s)	1st place, gold medalist(s)	5		3rd place, bronze medalist(s)	1st place, gold medalist(s)	3rd place, bronze medalist(s)
2025	Russian Championships	3rd place, bronze medalist(s)	1st place, gold medalist(s)	1st place, gold medalist(s)	4		3rd place, bronze medalist(s)	1st place, gold medalist(s)	
2025	World Championships		7				7	3rd place, bronze medalist(s)	8
2025	Voronin Cup		1st place, gold medalist(s)	5			1st place, gold medalist(s)	1st place, gold medalist(s)	
2026	Cairo World Cup			1st place, gold medalist(s)				6	4
2026	Russian Cup	3rd place, bronze medalist(s)	2nd place, silver medalist(s)	6		3rd place, bronze medalist(s)	1st place, gold medalist(s)	1st place, gold medalist(s)	
2026	Russian Championships	3rd place, bronze medalist(s)	6	2nd place, silver medalist(s)		4	1st place, gold medalist(s)	1st place, gold medalist(s)	
2026	European Championships	2nd place, silver medalist(s)	3rd place, bronze medalist(s)						
2026	World Championships	2nd place, silver medalist(s)	4					3rd place, bronze medalist(s)	
