= Arsenii Dukhno =

Russian artistic gymnast (born 2008)

- Арсений Андреевич Духно
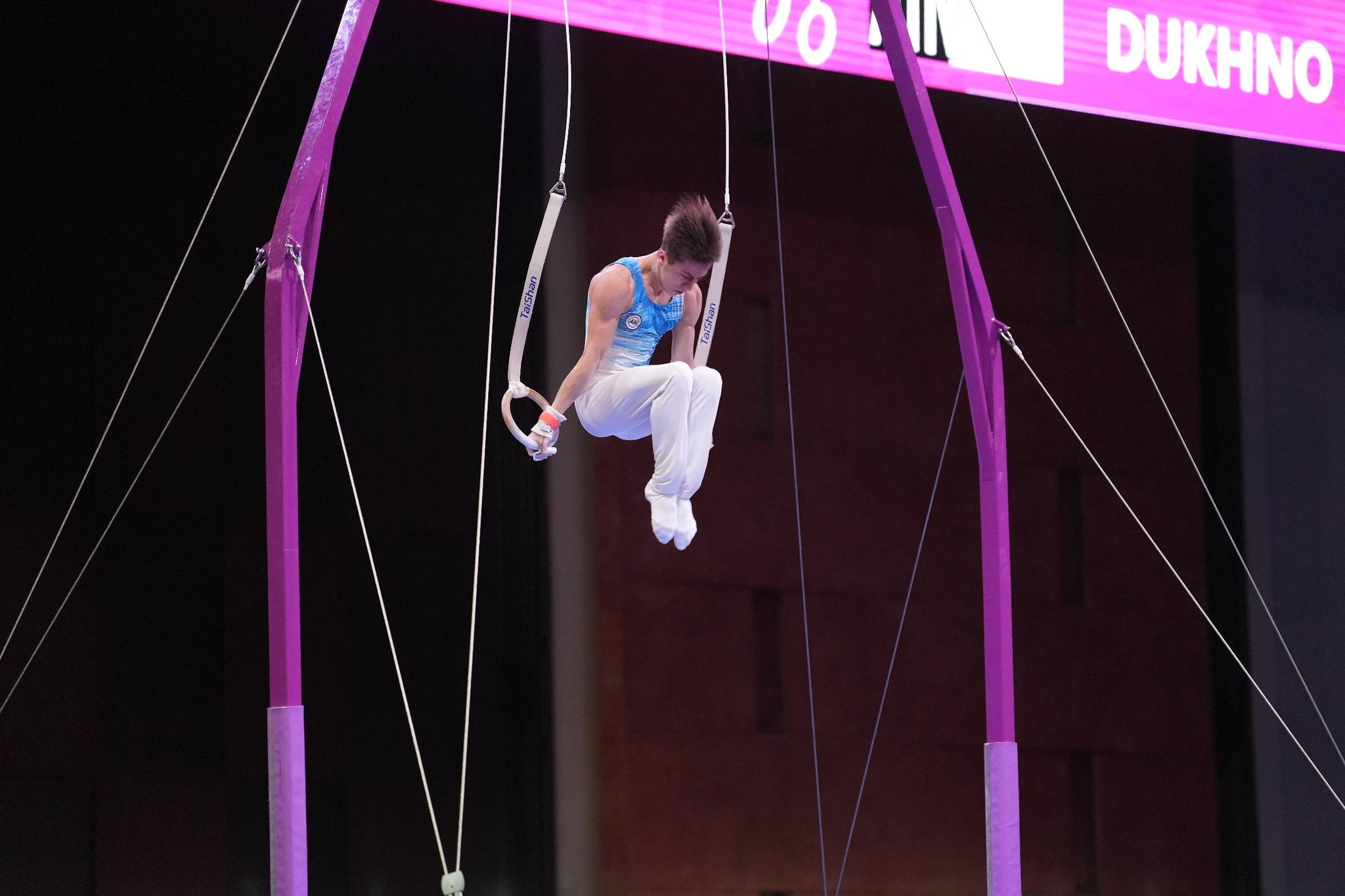
- Dukhno at the 2025 Junior World Championships

Personal information
- Full name: Arsenii Andreevich Dukhno
- Nickname: Arseniy
- Born: 5 August 2008 (age 18) Moscow, Russia

Gymnastics career
- Discipline: Men's artistic gymnastics
- Country represented: Russia; (2022–present)
Medal record
Representing Russia & (Individual Neutral Athletes) AIN
World Championships
Silver medal – second place	2026 Rotterdam	Team
European Championships
Silver medal – second place	2026 Zagreb	Team
Silver medal – second place	2026 Zagreb	All-around
Silver medal – second place	2026 Zagreb	Floor exercise
Junior World Championships
Gold medal – first place	2025 Manila	All-around
Gold medal – first place	2025 Manila	Vault

Arsenii Andreevich Dukhno (Russian: Арсений Андреевич Духно; born 5 August 2008) is a Russian artistic gymnast. He is the 2025 Junior World all-around and vault champion and the 2026 European all-around silver medalist.

== Gymnastics career ==
=== 2022–2025 ===
Dukhno joined the Russian national team in 2022; however he was unable to compete internationally due to the International Gymnastics Federation banning Russian and Belarusian athletes and officials from taking part in FIG-sanctioned competitions due to the Russian invasion of Ukraine. Domestically he won the all-around title at the 2024 and 2025 Junior Russian Championships and won the junior all-around title at the 2024 Voronin Cup.

Starting in 2025 the Artistic Gymnastics Federation of Russia began letting their athletes to apply for neutral status, allowing them to return to international competition. Despite being a junior, Dukhno was invited to compete at the Russian Senior National Championships where he posted the highest all-around score of the competition. Dukhno made his international debut at the 2025 Junior World Championships where he qualified for the all-around, floor exercise, pommel horse, rings, and vault finals. During the all-around final, despite falling off of the horizontal bar, he still won gold ahead of Nao Ojima of Japan. On the first day of apparatus finals he finished fourth on floor exercise and pommel horse and fifth on rings. On the final day of competition Dukhno won his second gold medal, placing first on vault. Dukhno ended the competition as one of only two competitors to win two individual gold medals, alongside Colombia's Camilo Vera.

=== 2026 ===
Dukhno became age-eligible for senior level competition in 2026. He made his senior international debut at the 2026 Cairo World Cup where he won silver on floor exercise and bronze on parallel bars. He next competed at the Russian Cup where he won his first domestic senior all-around title.

Dukhno competed at the 2026 European Championships alongside Mukhammadzhon Iakubov, Daniel Marinov, Savelii Sieedin, and Ilia Zaika. On the first day of competition Dukhno helped Russia (competing as World Gymnastics 2) qualify to the team final in first place and individually he won silver in the all-around, one-thousandth of a point behind Illia Kovtun. During event finals, he won silver on floor exercise behind two-time Olympic medalist Artem Dolgopyat and placed eighth on pommel horse and seventh on vault. On the final day of the competition, Dukhno helped his team place second behind Great Britain.

Dukhno was selected to represent Russia at the 2026 World Championships alongside Marinov, Sergei Naidin, Sieedin, and Zaika. The entire Russian delegation ran into visa issues as the Netherlands had not granted them prior to their initial scheduled departure date. On October 12, five days before the official competition start date, Dukhno alongside Marinov, Naidin and women's team member Alena Glotova, were granted visas. The rest of the men's team were granted visas but were not able to travel the Netherlands in time for podium training. During the qualification round, Dukhno helped Russia qualify to the team final and individually he qualified to the all-around, floor exercise, vault, and parallel bars finals. During the team final, Dukhno performed on all six apparatuses, helping Russia win the silver medal and qualifying them a whole team to the 2028 Summer Olympics. During the all-around final, Dukhno was sitting in second place after five of the six events; however he fell on the final event and ended the competition in seventh place. During event finals he placed sixth on floor exercise, fourth on vault, and sixth on parallel bars.

== Competitive history ==
Competitive history of Arsenii Dukhno at the junior level
Year	Event	Team	AA	FX	PH	SR	VT	PB	HB
2022	Russian Championships		5	3rd place, bronze medalist(s)	4				8
2023	Russian Championships		10	1st place, gold medalist(s)		5	1st place, gold medalist(s)		
2023	Kazan Friendly		1st place, gold medalist(s)	2nd place, silver medalist(s)	2nd place, silver medalist(s)		2nd place, silver medalist(s)	1st place, gold medalist(s)	
2024	Russian Championships		1st place, gold medalist(s)	1st place, gold medalist(s)	4	5	1st place, gold medalist(s)	1st place, gold medalist(s)	
2024	Belarus Open Cup	2nd place, silver medalist(s)	2nd place, silver medalist(s)	1st place, gold medalist(s)	3rd place, bronze medalist(s)		1st place, gold medalist(s)		
2024	Voronin Cup	1st place, gold medalist(s)	1st place, gold medalist(s)	1st place, gold medalist(s)	3rd place, bronze medalist(s)		1st place, gold medalist(s)	8	
2025	Russian Championships	1st place, gold medalist(s)	1st place, gold medalist(s)						
2025	Strongest Athletes Cup		1st place, gold medalist(s)	1st place, gold medalist(s)	1st place, gold medalist(s)	2nd place, silver medalist(s)	1st place, gold medalist(s)	2nd place, silver medalist(s)	1st place, gold medalist(s)
2025	Senior Russian Championships		1 (Note: Dukhno earned the highest all-around score but did not place due to being age-ineligible for senior level competition)						
2025	Junior World Championships		1st place, gold medalist(s)	4	4	5	1st place, gold medalist(s)		

Competitive history of Arsenii Dukhno at the senior level
Year	Event	Team	AA	FX	PH	SR	VT	PB	HB
2026	Cairo World Cup			2nd place, silver medalist(s)				3rd place, bronze medalist(s)	
2026	Russian Cup	1st place, gold medalist(s)	1st place, gold medalist(s)	1st place, gold medalist(s)	1st place, gold medalist(s)		3rd place, bronze medalist(s)	7	
2026	Russian Championships	1st place, gold medalist(s)	1st place, gold medalist(s)				2nd place, silver medalist(s)		3rd place, bronze medalist(s)
2026	European Championships	2nd place, silver medalist(s)	2nd place, silver medalist(s)	2nd place, silver medalist(s)	8		7		
2026	World Championships	2nd place, silver medalist(s)	7	6			4	6	
