= Ilia Zaika =

Russian artistic gymnast (born 2002)

- Илья Заика
- Born: 16 July 2002 (age 24) Donetsk, Ukraine
- Height: 170 cm (5 ft 7 in)

Gymnastics career
- Discipline: Men's artistic gymnastics
- Country represented: Russia
Medal record
Representing Russia & (Individual Neutral Athletes) AIN
World Championships
Silver medal – second place	2026 Rotterdam	Team
European Championships
Silver medal – second place	2026 Zagreb	Team
Silver medal – second place	2026 Zagreb	Rings

Ilia Sergeyevich Zaika (Russian: Илья Сергеевич Заика; born 16 July 2002) is a Russian artistic gymnast originating from Donetsk. He is the 2024 and 2025 Russian national champion and 2023 silver medalist on rings. A rings specialist, he has one strength element named after him on the apparatus.

== Gymnastics career ==
Zaika was born in Donetsk, Ukraine, in 2002. He started training in gymnastics at Sports School No. 12 in Donetsk at the age of five. He accepted an invitation to live and train in the Vladimir Oblast in Russia in 2018, moving there from the Donetsk People's Republic. Zaika represented the Vladimir Oblast in Russian competitions, and started competing at the senior level in 2023. A still rings specialist, he became the Russian national rings champion in 2024 and joined the national men's artistic gymnastics team. Zaika competed on rings at the 2025 World Championships in Jakarta, Indonesia, and finished 12th in qualifying.

He represented Russia at the 2026 European Artistic Gymnastic Championships, winning silver with the team and on rings behind Artur Avetisyan. In September 2026, Zaika won the rings event at the 2026 Paris World Challenge Cup. There he executed a new element, now named after him — a static press from a hang, head down, to an inverted cross — that received a difficulty rating H (0.8).

Zaika was selected to represent Russia at the 2026 World Championships alongside Arsenii Dukhno, Daniel Marinov, Sergei Naidin, and Savelii Sieedin. The entire Russian delegation ran into visa issues as the Netherlands had not granted them prior to their initial scheduled departure date. On October 12, five days before the official competition start date, Dukhno, Marinov, Naidin and women's team member Alena Glotova were granted visas. Zaika and the rest of the men's team were granted visas on October 13 but were not able to travel the Netherlands in time for podium training. During the qualification round, Zaika helped Russia qualify to the team final and individually he qualified to the rings final. During the team final, Zaika only performed on rings, helping Russia win the silver medal and qualifying them a whole team to the 2028 Summer Olympics.

== Competitive history ==
Year	Event	Team	AA	FX	PH	SR	VT	PB	HB
2026	European Championships	2nd place, silver medalist(s)				2nd place, silver medalist(s)			
2026	World Championships	2nd place, silver medalist(s)				5			
