= 2026 World Artistic Gymnastics Championships =

Artistic gymnastics competition

- Venue: Rotterdam Ahoy
- Location: Rotterdam, Netherlands
- Start date: 17 October 2026
- End date: 25 October 2026
- Website: rotterdam2026.com

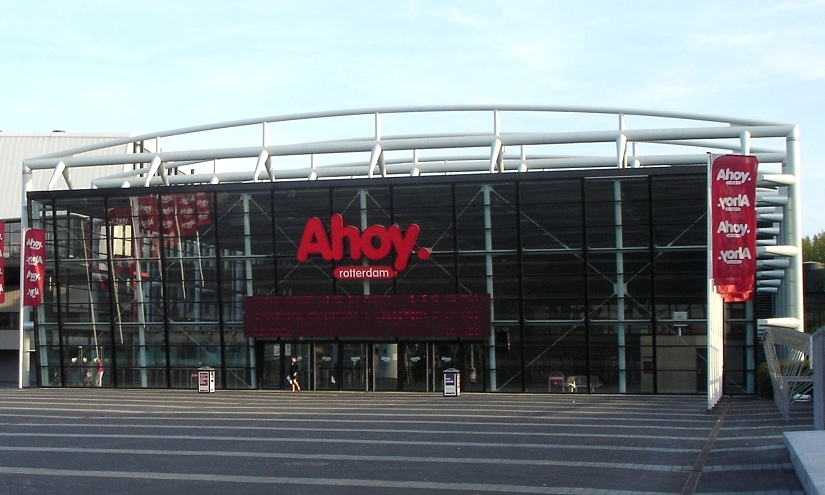
The host venue, Rotterdam Ahoy

The 2026 World Artistic Gymnastics Championships were held in Rotterdam, Netherlands from 17 to 25 October 2026 at Rotterdam Ahoy. This was the third time Rotterdam hosted the Artistic Gymnastics World Championships after doing so in 1987 and 2010.

This event served as a qualification event for the 2028 Summer Olympics in Los Angeles. The top three teams in both the men's and women's team finals obtained five quota places for Los Angeles as a team.

== Competition schedule ==
Date	Session	Time	Subdivisions
Saturday, 17 October	Men's Qualification	10:00 AM	MAG: Subdivision 1 Canada, Chinese Taipei, All Around Group 8, France, Brazil, All Around Group 5
Saturday, 17 October	Men's Qualification	12:10 PM	MAG: Subdivision 2 Apparatus Specialist Group 1, Apparatus Specialist Group 2, Ukraine, South Korea, Cyprus, Russia (Note: Due to regulations by the Dutch authorities, Russia competed under the name "World Gymnastics 2" (WG2). Despite this, World Gymnastics attributes the results to Russia.)
Saturday, 17 October	Men's Qualification	4:00 PM	MAG: Subdivision 3 All Around Group 2, Hungary, Egypt, Netherlands, Colombia, All Around Group 7
Saturday, 17 October	Men's Qualification	8:10 PM	MAG: Subdivision 4 Great Britain, Japan, All Around Group 9, United States, Australia, All Around Group 1
Sunday, 18 October	Men's Qualification	10:00 AM	MAG: Subdivision 5 Belgium, Italy, China, All Around Group 3, All Around Group 6, Spain
Sunday, 18 October	Men's Qualification	12:10 PM	MAG: Subdivision 6 Israel, Kazakhstan, Switzerland, All Around Group 10, Germany, All Around Group 4
Sunday, 18 October	Women's Qualification	4:00 PM	WAG: Subdivision 1 Germany, Romania, All Around Group 7, United States
Sunday, 18 October	Women's Qualification	5:50 PM	WAG: Subdivision 2 Japan, Australia, All Around Group 10, Belgium
Sunday, 18 October	Women's Qualification	7:40 PM	WAG: Subdivision 3 All Around Group 14, Italy, All Around Group 8, Mexico
Monday, 19 October	Women's Qualification	9:30 AM	WAG: Subdivision 4 All Around Group 6, Sweden, Belarus (Note: Due to regulations by the Dutch authorities, Belarus competed under the name "World Gymnastics 1" (WG1). Despite this, World Gymnastics attributes the results to Belarus.), All Around Group 2
Monday, 19 October	Women's Qualification	11:05 AM	WAG: Subdivision 5 Ukraine, All Around Group 9, Algeria, Argentina
Monday, 19 October	Women's Qualification	12:40 PM	WAG: Subdivision 6 France, All Around Group 4, Malaysia, All Around Group 3
Monday, 19 October	Women's Qualification	4:00 PM	WAG: Subdivision 7 Apparatus Specialist Group 2, Netherlands, Great Britain, Apparatus Specialist Group 1
Monday, 19 October	Women's Qualification	5:35 PM	WAG: Subdivision 8 Canada, All Around Group 11, Spain, Russia
Monday, 19 October	Women's Qualification	7:35 PM	WAG: Subdivision 9 Switzerland, Brazil, All Around Group 12, All Around Group 13
Monday, 19 October	Women's Qualification	9:10 PM	WAG: Subdivision 10; China, All Around Group 1, All Around Group 5, South Korea
Tuesday, 20 October	Men's Team Final	7:00 PM	Top 8 from qualification
Wednesday, 21 October	Women's Team Final	7:00 PM	Top 8 from qualification
Thursday, 22 October	Men's Individual All-Around Final	7:30 PM	Top 24 from qualification
Friday, 23 October	Women's Individual All-Around Final	7:30 PM	Top 24 from qualification
Saturday, 24 October	Apparatus Finals	2:00 PM	MAG: Floor, Pommel horse, Rings
Saturday, 24 October	Apparatus Finals	2:00 PM	WAG: Vault, Uneven bars
Sunday, 25 October	Apparatus Finals	2:00 PM	MAG: Vault, Parallel bars, Horizontal bar
Sunday, 25 October	Apparatus Finals	2:00 PM	WAG: Balance beam, Floor
Listed in local time (UTC+02:00). (Note: The final day of competition on 25 October is in CET (UTC+01:00) as daylight savings ends in the Netherlands on that day.)

== Qualification and quotas ==
Team and individual qualification is being determined via various Continental championships in 2026. Additional individual qualification is being determined through the 2026 World Cup series.

=== Men ===
Event	Qualified teams
2026 African Artistic Gymnastics Championships (top ranked team)	Egypt: Mohamed Afify; Mostafa Ahmed; Mazen Ali; Omar Elshobki; Omar Mohamed
2026 Asian Men's Artistic Gymnastics Championships (top 5 teams)	China: Lan Xingyu; Li Hongyan; Tian Hao; Yang Haonan; Zou Jingyuan; Hong Yanming; Japan: Ryosuke Doi; Fusuke Maeda; Daiki Hashimoto; Shohei Kawakami; Shinnosuke Oka; Nao Ojima; South Korea: Hur Woong; Kim Jae-ho; Lee Jung-hyo; Park Jin-ho; Park Seung-ho; Ryu Sung-hyun; Kazakhstan: Ilyas Azizov; Nurtan Idrissov; Milad Karimi; Roman Khegay; Nariman Kurbanov; Dmitriy Patanin; Chinese Taipei: Chiou Min-han; Hung Yuan-hsi; Lee Chih-kai; Tang Chia-hung; Wang Yi-hsiang; Wu Tsung-hua
2026 European Men's Artistic Gymnastics Championships (top 13 teams)	Russia (World Gymnastics 2): Arsenii Dukhno; Daniel Marinov; Sergey Naidin; Savelii Sieedin; Ilia Zaika; Mukhammadzhon Iakubov; Switzerland: Matteo Giubellini; Florian Langenegger; Mattia Piffaretti; Noe Seifert; Dominic Tamsel; Luca Giubellini; Great Britain: Joe Fraser; Harry Hepworth; Jake Jarman; Courtney Tulloch; Reuben Ward; Jonas Rushworth; Italy: Yumin Abbadini; Mario Macchiati; Simone Speranza; Gabriele Targhetta; Niccolò Vannucchi; Riccardo Villa; Belgium: Glen Cuyle; Nicola Cuyle; Noah Kuavita; Victor Martinez; Kilan Van der Aa; Germany: Nils Dunkel; Timo Eder; Lucas Kochan; Radomyr Stelmakh; Glenn Trebing; Alexander Kunz; France: Kevin Carvalho; Anthony Mansard; Naël Sakouhi; Melwin Touchais; Leeroy Traoré-Malatre; Swaïmy Bellil; Hungary: Dominik Kis; Krisztofer Mészáros; Botond Molnár; Benedek Tomcsányi; Szilárd Závory; Zala Zámbori; Netherlands: Amine Abaidi; Elijah Faverus; Jermain Grünberg; Jordi Hagenaar; Casimir Schmidt; Kyan Jacobs; Israel: Noam Berkovich; Artem Dolgopyat; Pavel Gulidov; Ilia Liubimov; Ron Ortal; Ron Pyatov; Spain: Daniel Carrión; Thierno Diallo; Nicolau Mir; Joel Plata; Ignacio Yockers; Rayderley Zapata; Ukraine: Nazar Chepurnyi; Vladyslav Hryko; Mykyta Melnykov; Bohdan Suprun; Oleg Verniaiev; Cyprus: Georgios Angonas; Ilias Georgio; Marios Georgiou; Neofytos Kyriakou; Sokratis Pilakouris
2026 Oceania Artistic Gymnastics Championships (top ranked team)	Australia: Aiden Frick; Tru Hagens; James Hardy; Ritam Malik; Jesse Moore; Benjamin Foster
2026 Pan American Artistic Gymnastics Championships (top 4 teams)	Canada: Jordan Carroll; René Cournoyer; Félix Dolci; Xavier Olasz; Samuel Zakutney; Ethan Ikeda; Colombia: Jorman Álvarez; Ángel Barajas; Thomas Mejía; Camilo Vera; Yan Zabala; Juan Felipe Ramos; United States: Patrick Hoopes; Danila Leykin; Kameron Nelson; Fred Richard; Shane Wiskus; Yul Moldauer; Brazil: Vitaliy Guimaraes; Arthur Mariano; Johnny Oshiro; Patrick Sampaio; Diogo Soares; Bernardo Actos

Event	Qualified individuals
2026 African Artistic Gymnastics Championships (top 2 all-arounders)	(Algeria) Adam Cogat (Morocco) Hamza Hossaini
2026 Asian Men's Artistic Gymnastics Championships (top 6 all-arounders)	(Philippines) Carlos Yulo (Uzbekistan) Ravshan Kamiljanov (Uzbekistan) Khabibullo Ergashev (Philippines) Eldrew Yulo (Mongolia) Usukhbayar Erkhembayar (Iran) Hooman Jafari
2026 European Men's Artistic Gymnastics Championships (top 24 all-arounders)	(Croatia) Illia Kovtun (Finland) Robert Kirmes (Norway) Peder Skogvang (Norway) Sebastian Sponevik (Turkey) Mert Efe Kılıçer (Finland) Elias Koski (Greece) Ioannis Chronopoulos (Austria) Gino Vetter (Czech Republic) Adam Lakomy (Belarus) Daniil Tvardouski (Belarus) Danila Hryharchuk (Turkey) Alperen Ege Avcı (Greece) Antonios Tantalidis (Poland) Kacper Garnczarek (Republic of Ireland) James Hickey (Iceland) Agust Davidsson (Iceland) Dagur Ólafsson (Bulgaria) Daniel Trifonov (Romania) Nik Tarca (Czech Republic) Jack Gagamov (Lithuania) Nedas Grikinis (Portugal) Luis Lechaud (Republic of Ireland) Adam Steele (Bulgaria) Kevin Penev
2026 Oceania Artistic Gymnastics Championships (top 2 all-arounders)	(New Zealand) Alexander Istock (New Zealand) Keegan Greene
2026 Pan American Artistic Gymnastics Championships (top 6 all-arounders)	(Argentina) Santiago Mayol (Puerto Rico) José López (Mexico) Isaac Núñez (Jamaica) Elel Baker (Puerto Rico) Jensuel Soto (Ecuador) Sefano Romero
2026 FIG Artistic Gymnastics World Cup series — Floor Exercise (Note: Gymnasts who advanced through the FIG World Cup series route may only compete on the event(s) they have qualified on, per World Gymnastics rules.) (top 8 in final standings)	(Belarus) Yahor Sharamkou (Slovenia) Anze Hribar (Republic of Ireland) Eamon Montgomery (Hong Kong) Cheung Ching (Republic of Ireland) Chester Enriquez (Chile) Luciano Letelier (Azerbaijan) Rasul Ahmadzada (Czech Republic) Jonas Danek
2026 FIG Artistic Gymnastics World Cup series — Pommel Horse (top 8 in final standings)	(Armenia) Hamlet Manukyan (Armenia) Mamikon Khachatryan (Bulgaria) David Ivanov (Slovenia) Gregor Rakovic (Republic of Ireland) Rhys McClenaghan (Sweden) William Sundell (Azerbaijan) Rasul Ahmadzada (Albania) Matvei Petrov
2026 FIG Artistic Gymnastics World Cup series — Rings (top 8 in final standings)	(Armenia) Artur Avetisyan (Azerbaijan) Nikita Simonov (Greece) Eleftherios Petrounias (Armenia) Artur Davtyan (Argentina) Daniel Villafañe (Chile) Joaquín Álvarez (Turkey) Mehmet Ayberk Koşak (Slovenia) Luka Bojanc
2026 FIG Artistic Gymnastics World Cup series — Vault (top 8 in final standings)	(Czech Republic) Ondřej Kalný (Czech Republic) Jonas Danek (Armenia) Artur Davtyan (Chile) Josué Armijo (Hong Kong) Cheung Ching (Belarus) Yahor Sharamkou (Slovenia) Beno Kunst (Chile) Ignacio Varas
2026 FIG Artistic Gymnastics World Cup series — Parallel Bars (top 8 in final standings)	(Norway) Theodor Gadderud (Sweden) David Rumbutis (Turkey) Ferhat Arıcan (Norway) Harald Wibye (Serbia) Petar Vefic (Uzbekistan) Rasulijon Abdurakhimov (Sweden) William Sundell (Azerbaijan) Rasul Ahmadzada
2026 FIG Artistic Gymnastics World Cup series — Horizontal Bar (top 8 in final standings)	(Chile) Luciano Letelier (Azerbaijan) Rasul Ahmadzada (Finland) Leo Lehtinen (Turkey) Kerem Şener (Greece) Apostolos Kanellos (Czech Republic) Tomáš Kalinič (Philippines) Miguel Besana (Bulgaria) Yordan Aleksandrov
Additional All-Around Gymnasts (Note: These quotas are reserved for countries who have not earned a team berth or qualified an individual through any of the above methods. Rankings are based on the all-around qualification round of the continental championships.) (4 from Asian Championships, 4 from Pan American Championships, 2 from African Championships, 2 from European Championships) (Note: Not all spots ended up being allocated)	(Thailand) Suphacheep Baobenmad (Singapore) Asher Pua (Malaysia) Luqman Al Hafiz Zulfa (South Africa) Daniel McLean (Tunisia) Louay Sahli (Peru) Edward Gonzales (Dominican Republic) Wilfry Contreras (Guatemala) Rahí García (Argentina) Nahuel Pardo (Luxembourg) Quentin Brandenburger (Georgia (country)) Levan Skhiladze

=== Women ===
Event	Qualified teams
2026 African Artistic Gymnastics Championships (top ranked team)	Algeria: Louna Hamames-Moallic; Sihem Hamidi; Léna Khenoun; Djenna Laroui; Kaylia Nemour
2026 Asian Women's Artistic Gymnastics Championships (top 4 teams)	China: Du Siyu; Ke Qinqin; Qiu Qiyuan; Zhang Qingying; Zhang Yihan; Qin Xinyi; Japan: Rina Kishi; Haruka Nakamura; Misa Nishiyama; Mana Okamura; Aiko Sugihara; Sara Yamaguchi; South Korea: Hwang Seo-hyun; Lim Su-min; Park Na-young; Shin Sol-yi; Yeo Seo-jeong; Lee Yun-seo; Malaysia: Zarith Imaan Khalid; Cadence Teh Zi Qi; Yeap Kang Xian; Rachel Yeoh Li Wen; Audi Zulkarnien
2026 European Women's Artistic Gymnastics Championships (top 13 teams)	Russia World Gymnastics 2: Aleksandra Anufrieva; Alyona Glotova; Milana Kaiumova; Liudmila Roshchina; Elizaveta Us; Zlata Osokina; Italy: Manila Esposito; Elisa Iorio; July Marano; Giulia Perotti; Sofia Tonelli; Anthea Sisio; France: Lorette Charpy; Elena Colas; Morgane Osyssek; Maïana Prat; Célia Serber; Alizée Letrange; Great Britain: Becky Downie; Ruby Evans; Alice Kinsella; Alia Leat; Abigail Martin; Shantae-Eve Amankwaah; Germany: Helen Kevric; Emma Malewski; Madita Mayr; Lea Marie Quaas; Karina Schönmaier; Charleen Pach; Netherlands: Vera van Pol; Sanna Veerman; Naomi Visser; Sanne Wevers; Vera Ubbink; Floor Slooff; Spain: Laura Casabuena; Marina Escudero; Laia Font; Aitana Pacheco; Alba Petisco; Carlota Armenta; Belgium: Mie de Wilde; Naomi Descamps; Lisa Vaelen; Jade Vansteenkiste; Liese Vieuxtemps; Sien Ghekiere; Ukraine: Kristina Hrudetska; Marianna Kiniuk; Bohdana Kovalova; Anastasiia Lev; Diana Lobok; Switzerland: Lena Bickel; Daria Hartmann; Anastassia Pascu; Samira Raffin; Anny Wu; Caterina Cereghetti; Romania: Alexia Blănaru; Ariana Coțu; Iris Iordache; Anamaria Mihăescu; Sabrina Voinea; Daria Tănasă; Sweden: Alva Eriksson; Nora Hanfelt; Maya Ståhl; Emelie Westlund; Nathalie Westlund; Belarus (World Gymnastics 1): Karolina Fedanyuk; Ulyana Kuzmenkova; Sofia Shtykhetskaya; Vera Sadyrbaeva; Anastasiya Smantsar
2026 Oceania Artistic Gymnastics Championships (top ranked team)	Australia: Kate McDonald; Ruby Pass; Breanna Scott; Lucy Stewart; Emily Whitehead; Romi Brown
2026 Pan American Artistic Gymnastics Championships (top 5 teams)	United States: Skye Blakely; Charleigh Bullock; Dulcy Caylor; Reese Esponda; Claire Pease; Hezly Rivera; Brazil: Rebeca Andrade; Thaís Fidélis; Lorrane Oliveira; Flávia Saraiva; Sophia Weisberg; Gabriela Bouças; Canada: Ellie Black; Gabrielle Black; Coralie Demers; Lia-Monica Fontaine; Lia Redick; Zoe Tsaprailis; Argentina: Emilia Acosta; Isabella Ajalla; Julieta Lucas; Sira Macías; Meline Mesropian; Rocío Saucedo; Mexico: Mariangela Flores; Paulina Guerra; Jazmyn Jiménez; Victoria Mata; Michelle Pineda; Julieta Bizarrón

Event	Qualified individuals
2026 African Artistic Gymnastics Championships (top 5 all-arounders)	(South Africa) Caitlin Rooskrantz (South Africa) Naveen Daries (Egypt) Judy Abdallah (Egypt) Jana Abdelsalam (Morocco) Salina Bousmayo
2026 Asian Women's Artistic Gymnastics Championships (top 10 all-arounders)	(Uzbekistan) Dildora Aripova (Chinese Taipei) Lai Pin-ju (Singapore) Amanda Yap (Uzbekistan) Aleksandra Shevchenko (Chinese Taipei) Ting Hua-tien (Philippines) Haylee Garcia (Hong Kong) Joanne Chen Hoi Yuen (Indonesia) Dylanov Brahmana (Singapore) Alena Tan (India) Nishka Agarwal
2026 European Women's Artistic Gymnastics Championships (top 26 all-arounders)	(Czech Republic) Soňa Artamonova (Slovenia) Lucija Hribar (Republic of Ireland) Emma Slevin (Austria) Leni Bohle (Czech Republic) Alice Vlková (Azerbaijan) Nazanin Teymurova (Luxembourg) Céleste Mordenti (Israel) Lihie Raz (Austria) Charlize Mörz (Republic of Ireland) Mimi Moloney (Hungary) Gréta Mayer (Norway) Christine Kubon (Turkey) Ceren Biner (Poland) Marta Pihan-Kulesza (Israel) Roni Shamay (Liechtenstein) Julia Weissenhofer (Slovenia) Vita Prijanovič (Finland) Kaia Tanskanen (Slovakia) Nela Ostrihoňová (Croatia) Mila Prpić (Norway) Keisha Lockert (Denmark) Cecilie Bergholt (Iceland) Lilja Gunnarsdóttir (Portugal) Mariana Parente (Azerbaijan) Daniz Aliyeva (Georgia (country)) Ani Gobadze
2026 Oceania Artistic Gymnastics Championships (top 2 all-arounders)	(New Zealand) Jun McDonald (New Zealand) Sienna Shields
2026 Pan American Artistic Gymnastics Championships (top 13 all-arounders)	(Panama) Ana Gabriela Gutierrez (Panama) Hillary Heron (Costa Rica) Samantha Marín (Jamaica) Jahzara Ranger (Ecuador) Ashley Bohorquez (Dominican Republic) Sophia Díaz (Colombia) Ginna Escobar (Puerto Rico) Karelys Díaz (Peru) Fabiola Díaz (Peru) Luana Roda (Chile) Paula Carvajal (Guatemala) Brithany Herrera (Costa Rica) Rachel Rodríguez
2026 FIG Artistic Gymnastics World Cup series — Vault (top 8 in final standings)	(Slovenia) Teja Belak (Croatia) Tijana Korent (Czech Republic) Patricie Makovickova (Panama) Ana Lucía Beitia (Greece) Athanasia Mesiri (Slovenia) Meta Kunaver (Qatar) Salma Hamed (Costa Rica) Marina Guevara
2026 FIG Artistic Gymnastics World Cup series — Uneven Bars (top 8 in final standings)	(Slovakia) Barbora Kundrát (Croatia) Sofia Mester (Greece) Magdalini Tsiori (Chinese Taipei) Pan Cai-chen (Greece) Elvira Katsali (Israel) Yali Shoshani (South Africa) Zelmé Daries (Slovenia) Meta Kunaver
2026 FIG Artistic Gymnastics World Cup series — Balance Beam (top 8 in final standings)	(Croatia) Tina Zelčić (Slovakia) Barbora Kundrát (Portugal) Mafalda Costa (Turkey) Sevgi Kayışoğlu (Hungary) Kira Balazs (Greece) Elvira Katsali (Malta) Philippa Busuttil (Iceland) Thelma Aðalsteinsdóttir (Hungary) Nikolett Szilágyi
2026 FIG Artistic Gymnastics World Cup series — Floor Exercise (top 8 in final standings)	(Turkey) Sevgi Kayışoğlu (Czech Republic) Patricie Makovickova (Portugal) Mafalda Costa (Chinese Taipei) Lee Chia-wei (Iceland) Thelma Aðalsteinsdóttir (Hungary) Nikolett Szilágyi (Panama) Alyiah Lide de León (Costa Rica) Marina Guevara
Additional All-Around Gymnasts (2 from Asian Championships, 2 from Pan American Championships, 1 from African Championships)	(Myanmar) Pan Ei Phyu (Honduras) Lily Guevara (El Salvador) María Mancia (Zimbabwe) Kylana Muchatuta

== Medal summary ==
=== Medalists ===
Names (italicized) denote the team alternate.

Event	Gold	Silver	Bronze
Men
Team	Japan; Ryosuke Doi; Daiki Hashimoto; Shohei Kawakami; Fusuke Maeda; Shinnosuke Oka (Nao Ojima)	Russia; Arsenii Dukhno; Daniel Marinov; Sergey Naidin; Savelii Sieedin; Ilia Zaika (Mukhammadzhon Iakubov)	China; Lan Xingyu; Li Hongyan; Tian Hao; Yang Haonan; Zou Jingyuan (Hong Yanming)
Individual all-around	(Japan) Daiki Hashimoto	(China) Yang Haonan	(United Kingdom) Joe Fraser
Floor	(United States) Frederick Richard	(United Kingdom) Jake Jarman	(Israel) Artem Dolgopyat
Pommel horse	(Armenia) Hamlet Manukyan	(Italy) Gabriele Targhetta	(Armenia) Mamikon Khachatryan
Rings	(China) Lan Xingyu	(Greece) Eleftherios Petrounias	(Armenia) Artur Avetisyan
Vault	(Armenia) Artur Davtyan	(United Kingdom) Jake Jarman	(Norway) Sebastian Sponevik
Parallel bars	(China) Zou Jingyuan	(Croatia) Illia Kovtun	(Russia) Daniel Marinov
Horizontal bar	(Chinese Taipei) Tang Chia-hung	(Japan) Shinnosuke Oka	(Russia) Sergei Naidin
Women
Team	China; Du Siyu; Ke Qinqin; Qiu Qiyuan; Zhang Qingying; Zhang Yihan (Qin Xinyi)	United States; Skye Blakely; Charleigh Bullock; Dulcy Caylor; Reese Esponda; Claire Pease (Hezly Rivera)	Japan; Rina Kishi; Haruka Nakamura; Misa Nishiyama; Mana Okamura; Aiko Sugihara (Sara Yamaguchi)
Individual all-around	(United States) Skye Blakely	(Russia) Liudmila Roshchina	(China) Ke Qinqin
Vault	(Brazil) Rebeca Andrade	(United States) Claire Pease	(United States) Skye Blakely
Uneven bars	(Algeria) Kaylia Nemour	(Germany) Helen Kevric	(United States) Skye Blakely
Balance beam	(Algeria) Kaylia Nemour	(China) Zhang Qingying	(Brazil) Flávia Saraiva
Floor	(United States) Claire Pease	(United States) Reese Esponda	(France) Maïana Prat

=== Medal standings ===
==== Overall ====
* Host nation (Netherlands)

Rank	Nation	Gold	Silver	Bronze	Total
1	United States	3	3	2	8
2	China	3	2	2	7
3	Japan	2	1	1	4
4	Armenia	2	0	2	4
5	Algeria	2	0	0	2
6	Brazil	1	0	1	2
7	Chinese Taipei	1	0	0	1
8	Russia	0	2	2	4
9	Great Britain	0	2	1	3
10	Croatia	0	1	0	1
10	Germany	0	1	0	1
10	Greece	0	1	0	1
10	Italy	0	1	0	1
14	France	0	0	1	1
14	Israel	0	0	1	1
14	Norway	0	0	1	1
Totals (16 entries)		14	14	14	42

==== Men ====
* Host nation (Netherlands)

Rank	Nation	Gold	Silver	Bronze	Total
1	China	2	1	1	4
2	Japan	2	1	0	3
3	Armenia	2	0	2	4
4	Chinese Taipei	1	0	0	1
4	United States	1	0	0	1
6	Great Britain	0	2	1	3
7	Russia	0	1	2	3
8	Croatia	0	1	0	1
8	Greece	0	1	0	1
8	Italy	0	1	0	1
11	Israel	0	0	1	1
11	Norway	0	0	1	1
Totals (12 entries)		8	8	8	24

==== Women ====
* Host nation (Netherlands)

Rank	Nation	Gold	Silver	Bronze	Total
1	United States	2	3	2	7
2	Algeria	2	0	0	2
3	China	1	1	1	3
4	Brazil	1	0	1	2
5	Germany	0	1	0	1
5	Russia	0	1	0	1
7	France	0	0	1	1
7	Japan	0	0	1	1
Totals (8 entries)		6	6	6	18

== Men's results ==
=== Team ===
Rank	Team	Floor (gymnastics)	Pommel horse	Rings (gymnastics)	Vault (gymnastics)	Parallel bars	Horizontal bar	Total
1st place, gold medalist(s)	Japan	41.299 (4)	42.332 (1)	40.933 (3)	42.966 (2)	42.099 (4)	42.299 (2)	251.928
1st place, gold medalist(s)	Ryosuke Doi	13.733	14.100		14.200			251.928
1st place, gold medalist(s)	Daiki Hashimoto	13.700	14.466	13.500	14.400	13.933	14.866	251.928
1st place, gold medalist(s)	Shohei Kawakami		13.766	13.333	14.366	14.566	13.100	251.928
1st place, gold medalist(s)	Fusuke Maeda						14.333	251.928
1st place, gold medalist(s)	Shinnosuke Oka	13.866		14.100		13.600		251.928
2nd place, silver medalist(s)	Russia	41.333 (2)	41.166 (6)	39.666 (4)	42.666 (3)	42.933 (2)	42.565 (1)	250.329
2nd place, silver medalist(s)	Arsenii Dukhno	14.500	13.833	13.100	14.200	14.233	14.066	250.329
2nd place, silver medalist(s)	Daniel Marinov	14.100		13.266	14.300	14.700		250.329
2nd place, silver medalist(s)	Sergei Naidin	12.733	13.233				14.566	250.329
2nd place, silver medalist(s)	Savelii Sieedin		14.100		14.166	14.000	13.933	250.329
2nd place, silver medalist(s)	Ilia Zaika			13.300				250.329
3rd place, bronze medalist(s)	China	42.698 (8)	39.633 (7)	41.466 (1)	44.166 (8)	43.166 (1)	41.299 (4)	249.193
3rd place, bronze medalist(s)	Lan Xingyu			14.733	13.466	13.800		249.193
3rd place, bronze medalist(s)	Li Hongyan	13.533			13.066		13.033	249.193
3rd place, bronze medalist(s)	Tian Hao	13.700	13.666				14.566	249.193
3rd place, bronze medalist(s)	Yang Haonan	12.466	13.466	14.000	14.466	14.200	13.633	249.193
3rd place, bronze medalist(s)	Zou Jingyuan		14.000	14.033		15.366		249.193
4	Great Britain	41.300 (3)	41.965 (2)	41.899 (2)	43.499 (1)	39.999 (7)	38.733 (8)	247.395
4	Joe Fraser	12.500	14.166	13.733		14.066	12.000	247.395
4	Harry Hepworth	14.300		14.666	14.600			247.395
4	Jake Jarman	14.500	13.366		14.866	13.700	13.233	247.395
4	Courtney Tulloch			13.500	14.033	12.233		247.395
4	Reuben Ward		14.433				13.500	247.395
5	Switzerland	40.333 (5)	41.700 (4)	39.433 (6)	41.699 (6)	42.766 (3)	40.566 (5)	246.497
5	Matteo Giubellini		14.000	13.000	13.800	14.300	13.233	246.497
5	Florian Langenegger	13.100	14.000		14.066			246.497
5	Mattia Piffaretti	13.700		13.433	13.833	14.200		246.497
5	Noe Seifert	13.533		13.000		14.266	14.000	246.497
5	Dominic Tamsel		13.700				13.333	246.497
6	United States	41.466 (1)	41.499 (5)	39.565 (5)	42.133 (4)	41.599 (5)	38.899 (7)	245.161
6	Patrick Hoopes		14.833					245.161
6	Danila Leykin	13.500	13.800		14.100	13.033	11.466	245.161
6	Kameron Nelson	14.133		13.366	14.033			245.161
6	Fred Richard	13.833	12.866	13.366		14.233	14.100	245.161
6	Shane Wiskus			12.833	14.000	14.333	13.333	245.161
7	Netherlands	39.832 (7)	41.866 (3)	38.299 (8)	41.766 (5)	40.599 (6)	38.932 (6)	241.294
7	Armine Abaidi	13.633		12.500	13.866	13.333	13.466	241.294
7	Loran de Munck		14.100					241.294
7	Elijah Faverus		14.100	13.166	13.900		11.866	241.294
7	Jermain Grünberg	13.233				13.900	13.600	241.294
7	Casimir Schmidt	12.966	13.666	12.633	14.000	13.366		241.294
8	Colombia	40.066 (6)	38.565 (8)	39.266 (7)	41.365 (7)	39.232 (8)	41.599 (3)	240.093
8	Jorman Álvarez			13.066				240.093
8	Ángel Barajas	13.900	13.933	13.100	13.966	13.633	14.900	240.093
8	Thomas Mejía	12.833	10.966		13.266	12.266		240.093
8	Camilo Vera	13.333	13.666	13.100	14.133	13.333	13.666	240.093
8	Yan Zabala						13.033	240.093

=== Individual all-around ===
Rank	Gymnast	Floor (gymnastics)	Pommel horse	Rings (gymnastics)	Vault (gymnastics)	Parallel bars	Horizontal bar	Total
1st place, gold medalist(s)	(Japan) Daiki Hashimoto	13.666	14.500	13.900	14.666	14.700	14.766	85.998
2nd place, silver medalist(s)	(China) Yang Haonan	13.700	13.900	14.100	14.400	14.566	13.533	84.199
3rd place, bronze medalist(s)	(United Kingdom) Joe Fraser	13.266	14.033	13.900	13.866	14.566	13.900	83.531
4	(Russia) Daniel Marinov	13.566	13.766	13.366	14.366	14.500	13.733	83.297
5	(Colombia) Ángel Barajas	13.833	13.800	13.100	14.100	14.333	14.066	83.232
6	(United Kingdom) Jake Jarman	13.933	13.366	13.066	14.900	14.200	13.400	82.865
7	(Russia) Arsenii Dukhno	14.666	14.100	12.933	14.766	14.666	11.566	82.697
8	(Japan) Shinnosuke Oka	13.966	13.866	14.000	12.700	14.300	13.333	82.165
9	(United States) Frederick Richard	13.866	12.900	13.566	13.533	14.100	14.200	82.165
10	(Switzerland) Noe Seifert	13.666	13.666	13.033	13.500	13.733	13.600	81.198
11	(Croatia) Illia Kovtun	12.466	12.466	12.866	13.933	14.700	13.833	80.264
12	(United States) Danila Leykin	13.800	13.033	12.400	13.533	13.433	13.466	79.665
13	(Italy) Yumin Abbadini	13.766	14.100	12.700	13.400	13.333	12.333	79.632
14	(Germany) Timo Eder	13.133	13.300	12.366	14.000	13.533	13.300	79.632
15	(France) Nael Sakouhi	13.366	13.000	12.533	14.033	13.266	13.300	79.498
16	(Switzerland) Florian Langenegger	13.600	10.933	12.233	13.900	14.066	13.066	77.798
17	(France) Anthony Mansard	13.233	11.100	12.200	14.000	13.200	13.800	77.533
18	(Belgium) Victor Martinez	11.700	12.133	12.833	14.266	13.700	12.833	77.465
19	(Canada) Samuel Zakutney	12.866	12.800	12.000	13.333	13.800	12.633	77.432
20	(Netherlands) Elijah Faverus	12.766	13.766	12.966	13.300	12.200	11.266	76.264
21	(Hungary) Krisztofer Mészáros	11.900	12.000	12.366	12.033	13.533	13.333	75.165
22	(Netherlands) Jermain Grünberg	12.966	10.500	11.966	12.866	12.833	13.566	74.697
23	(Kazakhstan) Nurtan Idrissov	12.266	12.066	13.366	13.866	11.433	11.400	74.397
24	(Colombia) Camilo Vera	9.833	11.200	13.233	14.000	13.933	11.700	73.899

=== Floor exercise ===
Rank	Gymnast	D Score	E Score	Pen.	Bon.	Total
1st place, gold medalist(s)	(United States) Fred Richard	5.700	8.833		0.10	14.633
2nd place, silver medalist(s)	(United Kingdom) Jake Jarman	6.300	8.300			14.600
3rd place, bronze medalist(s)	(Israel) Artem Dolgopyat	5.800	8.666			14.466
4	(Japan) Ryosuke Doi	5.800	8.566	-0.10	0.10	14.366
5	(Belarus) Yahor Sharamkou	5.800	8.200			14.000
6	(Russia) Arsenii Dukhno	5.900	8.066	-0.30		13.666
7	(Israel) Noam Berkovich	5.700	8.000	-0.20		13.500
8	(Philippines) Carlos Yulo	5.800	7.633	-0.30	0.10	13.233

=== Pommel horse ===
Rank	Gymnast	D Score	E Score	Pen.	Total
1st place, gold medalist(s)	(Armenia) Hamlet Manukyan	5.900	9.400		15.300
2nd place, silver medalist(s)	(Italy) Gabriele Targhetta	5.900	9.333		15.233
3rd place, bronze medalist(s)	(Armenia) Mamikon Khachatryan	5.800	9.200		15.000
4	(Kazakhstan) Nariman Kurbanov	5.800	9.133		14.933
5	(United States) Patrick Hoopes	6.100	8.833		14.933
6	(South Korea) Hur Woong	6.000	9.133	-0.30	14.833
7	(Belgium) Kilan Van der Aa	5.700	9.033		14.733
8	(Japan) Daiki Hashimoto	4.800	8.666		13.466

=== Rings ===
Rank	Gymnast	D Score	E Score	Pen.	Bon.	Total
1st place, gold medalist(s)	(China) Lan Xingyu	6.000	8.766			14.766
2nd place, silver medalist(s)	(Greece) Eleftherios Petrounias	5.700	8.533		0.10	14.333
3rd place, bronze medalist(s)	(Armenia) Artur Avetisyan	5.400	8.833			14.233
4	(Japan) Shinnosuke Oka	5.100	8.933		0.10	14.133
5	(Russia) Ilia Zaika	5.700	8.400			14.100
6	(Turkey) Mehmet Ayberk Koşak	5.500	8.300			13.800
7	(United Kingdom) Courtney Tulloch	5.700	7.666			13.366
8	(Belgium) Glen Cuyle	5.300	7.533			12.833

=== Vault ===
Rank	Gymnast	Vault 1					Vault 2					Total
Rank	Gymnast	D Score	E Score	Pen.	Bon.	Score 1	D Score	E Score	Pen.	Bon.	Score 2	Total
1st place, gold medalist(s)	(Armenia) Artur Davtyan	5.200	9.500		0.10	14.800	5.200	9.600		0.1	14.900	14.850
2nd place, silver medalist(s)	(United Kingdom) Jake Jarman	5.600	9.300			14.900	5.200	9.200			14.400	14.650
3rd place, bronze medalist(s)	(Norway) Sebastian Sponevik	5.200	9.133			14.333	5.200	9.200			14.400	14.366
4	(Ukraine) Nazar Chepurnyi	5.200	9.100			14.300	5.200	9.200			14.400	14.350
4	(Russia) Arsenii Dukhno	5.200	9.200			14.400	5.200	9.100			14.300	14.350
6	(United Kingdom) Harry Hepworth	5.200	9.000			14.200	5.600	8.333			13.933	14.066
7	(Philippines) Carlos Yulo	5.600	8.033	-0.30		13.333	5.200	9.233			14.433	13.883
8	(Japan) Shohei Kawakami	5.200	8.000			13.200	5.200	8.566	-0.30		13.466	13.333

=== Parallel bars ===
Rank	Gymnast	D Score	E Score	Pen.	Bon.	Total
1st place, gold medalist(s)	(China) Zou Jingyuan	6.000	9.633		0.10	15.733
2nd place, silver medalist(s)	(Croatia) Illia Kovtun	6.000	8.900			14.900
3rd place, bronze medalist(s)	(Russia) Daniel Marinov	5.900	8.966			14.866
4	(Japan) Daiki Hashimoto	5.600	8.900		0.10	14.600
5	(Japan) Shinnosuke Oka	5.600	8.966			14.566
6	(Russia) Arsenii Dukhno	5.600	8.400		0.10	14.100
7	(Sweden) David Rumbutis	5.400	8.366		0.10	13.866
8	(Switzerland) Noe Seifert	5.300	7.200			12.500

=== Horizontal bar ===
Rank	Gymnast	D Score	E Score	Pen.	Bon.	Total
1st place, gold medalist(s)	(Chinese Taipei) Tang Chia-hung	6.600	8.366			14.966
2nd place, silver medalist(s)	(Japan) Shinnosuke Oka	5.800	8.900		0.10	14.800
3rd place, bronze medalist(s)	(Russia) Sergei Naidin	6.400	8.400			14.800
4	(Japan) Shohei Kawakami	5.900	8.600		0.10	14.600
5	(Australia) Jesse Moore	5.600	8.733		0.10	14.433
6	(Colombia) Camilo Vera	5.600	7.633		0.10	13.333
7	(Colombia) Ángel Barajas	6.600	6.733			13.333
8	(Italy) Yumin Abbadini	5.300	7.300			12.600

== Women's results ==
=== Team ===
Rank	Team	Vault (gymnastics)	Uneven bars	Balance beam	Floor (gymnastics)	Total
1st place, gold medalist(s)	China	40.966 (5)	42.466 (2)	43.366 (1)	38.966 (6)	165.764
1st place, gold medalist(s)	Du Siyu	14.100	14.300			165.764
1st place, gold medalist(s)	Ke Qinqin	13.633		14.400	13.100	165.764
1st place, gold medalist(s)	Qiu Qiyuan		14.233	13.900	12.833	165.764
1st place, gold medalist(s)	Zhang Yihan					165.764
1st place, gold medalist(s)	Zhang Qingying	13.233	13.933	15.066	13.033	165.764
2nd place, silver medalist(s)	United States	42.633 (1)	42.766 (1)	39.199 (5)	40.933 (1)	165.531
2nd place, silver medalist(s)	Skye Blakely	14.300	14.400	13.266		165.531
2nd place, silver medalist(s)	Charleigh Bullock	14.133	14.000			165.531
2nd place, silver medalist(s)	Dulcy Caylor			12.333	13.600	165.531
2nd place, silver medalist(s)	Reese Esponda				13.400	165.531
2nd place, silver medalist(s)	Claire Pease	14.200	14.366	13.600	13.933	165.531
3rd place, bronze medalist(s)	Japan	42.132 (2)	40.432 (5)	41.066 (3)	40.433 (2)	164.063
3rd place, bronze medalist(s)	Rina Kishi	13.966			13.233	164.063
3rd place, bronze medalist(s)	Haruka Nakamura		13.966	14.133		164.063
3rd place, bronze medalist(s)	Misa Nishiyama	13.966	12.533	13.233		164.063
3rd place, bronze medalist(s)	Mana Okamura		13.933	13.700	13.300	164.063
3rd place, bronze medalist(s)	Aiko Sugihara	14.200			13.900	164.063
4	France	39.933 (7)	39.732 (6)	41.366 (2)	40.099 (3)	161.130
4	Lorette Charpy	13.200	11.866			161.130
4	Elena Colas		14.433	14.200	13.100	161.130
4	Morgane Osyssek-Reimer			13.266	13.566	161.130
4	Maïana Prat	13.800		13.900	13.433	161.130
4	Célia Serber	12.933	13.433			161.130
5	Brazil	41.433 (4)	39.132 (8)	40.532 (4)	38.633 (7)	159.730
5	Rebeca Andrade	14.400		13.433		159.730
5	Thaís Fidélis		12.466	13.033	12.933	159.730
5	Lorrane Oliveira		13.533		12.900	159.730
5	Flávia Saraiva	13.000	13.133	14.066	12.800	159.730
5	Sophia Weisberg	14.033				159.730
6	Russia	40.299 (6)	41.332 (4)	38.498 (6)	39.265 (4)	159.394
6	Alena Glotova		13.966	12.166	12.766	159.394
6	Milana Kaiumova		14.433			159.394
6	Aleksandra Anufrieva	12.700			13.066	159.394
6	Elizaveta Us	13.633		13.566		159.394
6	Liudmila Roshchina	13.966	12.933	12.766	13.433	159.394
7	Italy	39.632 (8)	42.166 (3)	37.732 (8)	38.599 (8)	158.129
7	Manila Esposito			13.100	13.133	158.129
7	Elisa Iorio	13.166	14.300			158.129
7	July Marano	13.500			12.800	158.129
7	Giulia Perotti		14.400	12.566		158.129
7	Sofia Tonelli	12.966	13.466	12.066	12.666	158.129
8	Canada	41.565 (3)	39.599 (7)	37.866 (7)	39.066 (5)	158.096
8	Ellie Black	13.933	13.000	13.733		158.096
8	Gabrielle Black				12.400	158.096
8	Coralie Demers		13.366			158.096
8	Lia-Monica Fontaine	14.166	13.233	13.000	13.366	158.096
8	Lia Redick	13.466		11.133	13.300	158.096

=== Individual all-around ===
Rank	Gymnast	Vault (gymnastics)	Uneven bars	Balance beam	Floor (gymnastics)	Total
1st place, gold medalist(s)	(United States) Skye Blakely	14.200	14.400	14.200	12.933	55.733
2nd place, silver medalist(s)	(Russia) Liudmila Roshchina	14.033	14.333	13.433	13.400	55.199
3rd place, bronze medalist(s)	(China) Ke Qinqin	14.033	13.900	13.833	13.266	55.032
4	(Algeria) Kaylia Nemour	12.366	14.866	14.500	13.266	54.998
5	(Japan) Aiko Sugihara	14.266	13.533	13.566	13.400	54.765
6	(France) Elena Colas	13.200	14.433	13.933	13.100	54.666
7	(United States) Claire Pease	14.133	13.833	12.533	13.733	54.232
8	(Spain) Alba Petisco	13.633	13.766	13.466	13.333	54.198
9	(China) Zhang Qingying	13.066	13.933	14.233	12.866	54.098
10	(Italy) Giulia Perotti	13.100	14.366	13.766	12.866	54.098
11	(Netherlands) Naomi Visser	13.200	14.033	12.533	13.100	52.866
12	(Brazil) Flávia Saraiva	13.066	13.300	13.233	13.200	52.799
13	(United Kingdom) Alice Kinsella	13.833	13.466	12.166	13.300	52.765
14	(Italy) Sofia Tonelli	13.500	13.300	13.300	12.566	52.666
15	(Japan) Rina Kishi	13.900	13.066	12.500	13.166	52.632
16	(Canada) Ellie Black	13.433	13.833	12.366	12.900	52.532
17	(France) Maïana Prat	13.666	12.200	12.900	13.300	52.066
18	(United Kingdom) Abigail Martin	13.800	13.166	11.500	13.133	51.599
19	(Russia) Alena Glotova	13.066	14.333	11.066	12.700	51.165
20	(Belgium) Lisa Vaelen	14.033	12.833	11.000	13.100	50.966
21	(Brazil) Lorrane Oliveira	13.066	13.700	11.066	13.100	50.932
22	(Hungary) Gréta Mayer	13.400	13.033	12.033	12.166	50.632
23	(Australia) Breanna Scott	12.066	13.100	12.900	12.466	50.532
24	(Canada) Lia Redick	13.666	12.033	10.466	12.066	48.231

=== Vault ===
Position	Gymnast	Vault 1				Vault 2				Bonus	Total
Position	Gymnast	D Score	E Score	Pen.	Score 1	D Score	E Score	Pen.	Score 2	Bonus	Total
1st place, gold medalist(s)	(Brazil) Rebeca Andrade	5.000	9.400		14.400	4.800	9.333		14.133	0.20	14.466
2nd place, silver medalist(s)	(United States) Claire Pease	5.600	8.766		14.366	5.000	9.000	-0.3	13.700	0.20	14.233
3rd place, bronze medalist(s)	(United States) Skye Blakely	5.000	9.100		14.100	4.800	9.033		13.833	0.20	14.166
4	(Canada) Lia-Monica Fontaine	5.000	9.000		14.000	4.800	8.966		13.766	0.20	14.083
5	(Canada) Ellie Black	4.800	9.266		14.066	4.400	9.066		13.466	0.20	13.966
6	(Mexico) Victoria Mata	5.400	8.966		14.366	4.200	8.900		13.100	0.20	13.933
7	(South Korea) Yeo Seo-jeong	5.400	9.200		14.600	5.000	7.833		12.833		13.716
8	(United Kingdom) Abigail Martin	5.000	8.600		13.600	4.800	8.633		13.433	0.20	13.716

=== Uneven bars ===
Rank	Gymnast	D Score	E Score	Pen.	Total
1st place, gold medalist(s)	(Algeria) Kaylia Nemour	7.000	8.333		15.333
2nd place, silver medalist(s)	(Germany) Helen Kevric	6.400	8.433		14.833
3rd place, bronze medalist(s)	(United States) Skye Blakely	6.200	8.400		14.600
4	(France) Elena Colas	6.300	8.233		14.533
5	(Netherlands) Naomi Visser	6.300	8.066		14.366
6	(Russia) Alena Glotova	6.200	8.033		14.233
7	(Italy) Giulia Perotti	5.900	7.366		13.266
8	(Italy) Elisa Iorio	5.700	6.800		12.500

=== Balance beam ===
Rank	Gymnast	D Score	E Score	Pen.	Total
1st place, gold medalist(s)	(Algeria) Kaylia Nemour	6.300	8.266		14.566
2nd place, silver medalist(s)	(China) Zhang Qingying	6.500	8.066		14.566
3rd place, bronze medalist(s)	(Brazil) Flávia Saraiva	6.100	8.200		14.300
4	(France) Elena Colas	5.900	8.200		14.100
5	(Italy) Manila Esposito	5.800	8.266		14.066
6	(United States) Skye Blakely	5.900	7.733		13.633
7	(China) Qiu Qiyuan	6.100	7.533		13.633
8	(Japan) Mana Okamura	5.900	6.766		12.666

=== Floor exercise ===
Rank	Gymnast	D Score	E Score	Pen.	Total
1st place, gold medalist(s)	(United States) Claire Pease	6.100	7.866	-0.10	13.866
2nd place, silver medalist(s)	(United States) Reese Esponda	6.000	7.566		13.566
3rd place, bronze medalist(s)	(France) Maïana Prat	5.600	7.866		13.466
4	(United Kingdom) Abigail Martin	5.800	7.666		13.466
5	(Canada) Lia Redick	5.400	7.900		13.300
6	(Canada) Lia-Monica Fontaine	5.400	7.800		13.200
7	(Russia) Liudmila Roshchina	5.600	7.500		13.100
8	(United Kingdom) Alice Kinsella	5.100	7.866		12.966

== Qualification ==
=== Men ===
==== Team ====
Rank	Team	Floor (gymnastics)	Pommel horse	Rings (gymnastics)	Vault (gymnastics)	Parallel bars	Horizontal bar	Total	Qual.
1	Japan	41.433 (3)	41.966 (3)	41.265 (3)	42.599 (2)	44.466 (1)	42.800 (1)	254.529	Q
1	Ryosuke Doi	14.033	13.533	12.566	14.033	14.266		254.529	Q
1	Daiki Hashimoto	13.600	14.533	13.733	14.266	14.800	13.700	254.529	Q
1	Shohei Kawakami	13.333	13.200	13.466	14.300	14.800	14.600	254.529	Q
1	Fusuke Maeda						13.566	254.529	Q
1	Shinnosuke Oka	13.800	13.900	14.066	13.966	14.866	14.500	254.529	Q
2	Great Britain	41.599 (2)	42.199 (1)	41.832 (2)	42.799 (1)	42.899 (5)	40.132 (11)	251.460	Q
2	Joe Fraser	13.500	13.700	13.666	13.866	14.400	13.933	251.460	Q
2	Harry Hepworth	13.966		13.666	14.033			251.460	Q
2	Jake Jarman	14.133	14.033	12.833	14.900	14.466	13.333	251.460	Q
2	Courtney Tulloch			14.500	13.533	14.033		251.460	Q
2	Reuben Ward	13.066	14.466			13.733	12.866	251.460	Q
3	Russia	39.633 (10)	40.799 (5)	40.999 (4)	42.499 (3)	43.133 (3)	42.099 (2)	249.162	Q
3	Arsenii Dukhno	14.700	13.133	13.100	14.300	14.600	14.033	249.162	Q
3	Daniel Marinov	12.233	13.566	13.366	13.966	14.700	13.733	249.162	Q
3	Sergei Naidin	12.700	13.233		13.433	13.833	14.233	249.162	Q
3	Savelii Sieedin	11.966	14.000	11.733	14.233	13.566	13.833	249.162	Q
3	Ilia Zaika			14.533				249.162	Q
4	China	40.766 (5)	40.165 (11)	41.932 (1)	41.366 (9)	43.565 (2)	39.699 (13)	247.493	Q
4	Lan Xingyu	10.833	8.100	14.733	13.133	13.633	12.066	247.493	Q
4	Li Hongyan	13.866			13.900		12.133	247.493	Q
4	Tian Hao	13.500	12.133	7.766	11.066	12.633	14.000	247.493	Q
4	Yang Haonan	13.400	13.966	13.733	14.333	14.466	13.566	247.493	Q
4	Zou Jingyuan		14.066	13.466		15.466		247.493	Q
5	United States	41.766 (1)	40.599 (8)	39.699 (7)	42.399 (4)	50.065 16)	41.433 (3)	245.961	Q
5	Patrick Hoopes		14.666					245.961	Q
5	Danila Leykin	14.000	11.666	12.700	14.066	12.766	13.800	245.961	Q
5	Kameron Nelson	13.533		13.833	14.100	12.700		245.961	Q
5	Fred Richard	14.233	13.933	13.166	13.800	12.833	14.133	245.961	Q
5	Shane Wiskus	11.800	12.000	12.100	14.233	14.466	13.500	245.961	Q
6	Switzerland	40.266 (6)	41.566 (4)	39.333 (10)	41.466 (8)	42.966 (4)	38.833 (16)	244.430	Q
6	Matteo Giubellini	13.100	14.066	13.200	13.133	14.100	11.700	244.430	Q
6	Florian Langenegger	12.900	13.800	12.533	13.800	14.166	13.400	244.430	Q
6	Mattia Piffaretti	13.700		13.000	13.833	14.200		244.430	Q
6	Noe Seifert	13.466	13.266	13.133	13.833	14.600	12.300	244.430	Q
6	Dominic Tamsel		13.700				13.133	244.430	Q
7	Netherlands	40.132 (7)	40.699 (6)	38.799 (12)	41.566 (6)	41.666 (7)	40.133 (10)	242.995	Q
7	Amine Abaidi	13.433		12.533	14.133	13.733	13.333	242.995	Q
7	Loran de Munck		13.833					242.995	Q
7	Elijah Faverus	12.766	13.700	13.400	13.500	12.800	13.300	242.995	Q
7	Jermain Grünberg	13.366	12.533	11.700	13.100	14.233	13.500	242.995	Q
7	Casimir Schmidt	13.333	13.166	12.866	13.933	13.700	11.266	242.995	Q
8	Colombia	39.198 (14)	40.099 (12)	39.566 (8)	40.932 (11)	42.433 (6)	40.499 (5)	242.727	Q
8	Jorman Álvarez			12.833				242.727	Q
8	Ángel Barajas	13.566	13.666	13.300	13.666	14.300	14.333	242.727	Q
8	Thomas Mejía	10.766	12.900	12.466	13.333	13.800	12.000	242.727	Q
8	Camilo Vera	13.366	13.533	13.433	13.933	14.333	14.166	242.727	Q
8	Yan Zabala	12.266	11.566		13.200	12.133	11.900	242.727	Q
9	Italy	39.766 (8)	40.366 (10)	39.766 (6)	41.299 (10)	41.032 (13)	40.266 (8)	242.495	R1
9	Yumin Abbadini	13.600	14.000	12.700	13.233	13.366	14.166	242.495	R1
9	Mario Macchiati	13.200	11.533	12.233	13.766	14.133	13.100	242.495	R1
9	Simone Speranza	12.966	9.633	13.466	14.100	13.300	12.400	242.495	R1
9	Gabriele Targhetta		14.833					242.495	R1
9	Niccolò Vannucchi	11.833		13.600	13.433	13.533	13.000	242.495	R1
10	Belgium	39.299 (12)	38.999 (16)	40.566 (5)	41.632 (5)	41.566 (9)	39.832 (17)	240.894	R2
10	Nicola Cuyle	12.900	11.833	13.400	13.533	14.033	11.066	240.894	R2
10	Glen Cuyle	13.033		14.100	14.066	13.900		240.894	R2
10	Noah Kuavita	12.033	12.233		13.800	13.633	12.733	240.894	R2
10	Victor Martinez	13.366	12.166	13.066	13.766	13.533	13.166	240.894	R2
10	Kilan Van der Aa		14.600				12.933	240.894	R2
11	France	39.066 (15)	39.599 (14)	38.566 (14)	41.533 (7)	39.733 (18)	40.166 (9)	238.663	R3
11	Kevin Carvalho	12.066			13.800	12.700	13.833	238.663	R3
11	Anthony Mansard	13.000	12.633	12.633	13.700	13.533	13.700	238.663	R3
11	Nael Sakouhi	13.300	13.433	12.733	14.000	13.500	12.033	238.663	R3
11	Melwin Touchais		13.533	13.200				238.663	R3
11	Leeroy Traore-Malatre	12.766	12.633	11.833	13.733	11.166	12.633	238.663	R3
12	Kazakhstan	39.732 (9)	42.065 (2)	38.966 (11)	40.499 (15)	39.332 (22)	37.000 (22)	237.594	R4
12	Ilyas Azizov	13.766	14.066	12.200	13.933	11.966	11.700	237.594	R4
12	Nurtan Idrissov	13.033	13.033	13.500	13.666	13.833	12.600	237.594	R4
12	Milad Karimi	12.566	13.133				12.700	237.594	R4
12	Nariman Kurbanov		14.866					237.594	R4
12	Dmitriy Patanin	12.933		13.266	12.900	13.533	10.466	237.594	R4

==== Individual all-around ====
Rank	Gymnast	Floor (gymnastics)	Pommel horse	Rings (gymnastics)	Vault (gymnastics)	Parallel bars	Horizontal bar	Total	Qual.
1	(Japan) Shinnosuke Oka	13.800	13.900	14.066	13.966	14.866	14.500	85.098	Q
2	(Japan) Daiki Hashimoto	13.600	14.533	13.733	14.266	14.800	13.700	84.632	Q
3	(Russia) Arsenii Dukhno	14.700	13.133	13.100	14.300	14.600	14.033	83.866	Q
4	(Japan) Shohei Kawakami	13.333	13.200	13.466	14.300	14.800	14.600	83.699	–
5	(United Kingdom) Jake Jarman	14.133	14.033	12.833	14.900	14.466	13.333	83.698	Q
6	(China) Yang Haonan	13.400	13.966	13.733	14.333	14.466	13.566	83.464	Q
7	(Croatia) Illia Kovtun	14.000	13.400	13.100	13.966	14.900	13.733	83.099	Q
8	(United Kingdom) Joe Fraser	13.500	13.700	13.666	13.866	14.400	13.933	83.065	Q
9	(Colombia) Ángel Barajas	13.566	13.666	13.300	13.666	14.300	14.333	82.831	Q
10	(Colombia) Camilo Vera	13.366	13.533	13.433	13.933	14.333	14.166	82.764	Q
11	(United States) Fred Richard	14.233	13.933	13.166	13.800	12.833	14.133	82.098	Q
12	(Russia) Daniel Marinov	12.233	13.566	13.366	13.966	14.700	13.733	81.564	Q
13	(Italy) Yumin Abbadini	13.600	14.000	12.700	13.233	13.366	14.166	81.065	Q
14	(Switzerland) Florian Langenegger	12.900	13.800	12.533	13.800	14.166	13.400	80.599	Q
15	(Switzerland) Noe Seifert	13.466	13.266	13.133	13.833	14.600	12.300	80.598	Q
16	(Hungary) Krisztofer Mészáros	13.033	12.766	12.933	13.966	14.166	13.400	80.264	Q
17	(Kazakhstan) Nurtan Idrissov	13.033	13.033	13.500	13.666	13.833	12.600	79.665	Q
18	(Netherlands) Elijah Faverus	12.766	13.700	13.400	13.500	12.800	13.300	79.466	Q
19	(Russia) Savelii Sieedin	11.966	14.000	11.733	14.233	13.566	13.833	79.331	–
20	(Switzerland) Matteo Giubellini	13.100	14.066	13.200	13.133	14.100	11.700	79.299	–
21	(France) Anthony Mansard	13.000	12.633	12.633	13.700	13.533	13.700	79.199	Q
22	(Belgium) Victor Martinez	13.366	12.166	13.066	13.766	13.533	13.166	79.063	Q
23	(France) Nael Sakouhi	13.300	13.433	12.733	14.000	13.500	12.033	78.999	Q
24	(United States) Danila Leykin	14.000	11.666	12.700	14.066	12.766	13.800	78.998	Q
25	(Canada) Samuel Zakutney	13.333	12.666	12.366	13.066	14.000	13.333	78.764	Q
26	(Germany) Timo Eder	11.833	13.566	12.366	13.700	13.800	13.200	78.465	Q
27	(Netherlands) Jermain Grünberg	13.366	12.533	11.700	13.100	14.233	13.500	78.432	Q
28	(Netherlands) Casimir Schmidt	13.333	13.166	12.866	13.933	13.700	11.266	78.264	–
29	(Chinese Taipei) Tang Chia-hung	12.033	12.600	13.600	14.133	11.200	14.566	78.132	R1
30	(United States) Shane Wiskus	11.800	12.00	12.100	14.233	14.466	13.500	78.099	–
31	(Italy) Mario Macchiati	13.200	11.533	12.233	13.766	14.133	13.100	77.965	R2
32	(Egypt) Omar Mohamed	12.200	12.600	13.600	13.400	13.433	12.666	77.899	R3
33	(Spain) Ignacio Yockers	12.433	14.300	11.666	13.300	13.533	12.600	77.832	R4

==== Floor exercise ====
Rank	Gymnast	D Score	E Score	Pen.	Bon.	Total	Qual.
1	(Russia) Arsenii Dukhno	5.900	8.700		0.1	14.700	Q
2	(Philippines) Carlos Yulo	5.700	8.800			14.500	Q
3	(Israel) Artem Dolgopyat	5.800	8.500			14.300	Q
4	(United States) Fred Richard	5.700	8.733	-0.3	0.1	14.233	Q
5	(United Kingdom) Jake Jarman	6.300	7.933	-0.1		14.133	Q
6	(Belarus) Yahor Sharamkou	5.800	8.400	-0.1		14.100	Q
7	(Israel) Noam Berkovich	5.700	8.233		0.1	14.033	Q
8	(Japan) Ryosuke Doi	5.700	8.233		0.1	14.033	Q
9	(Croatia) Illia Kovtun	5.500	8.500			14.000	R1
9	(United States) Danila Leykin	5.500	8.500			14.000	R1
11	(United Kingdom) Harry Hepworth	6.100	7.866	-0.1	0.1	13.966	R3

==== Pommel horse ====
Rank	Gymnast	D Score	E Score	Pen.	Total	Qual.
1	(Armenia) Hamlet Manukyan	5.900	9.033		14.933	Q
2	(Kazakhstan) Nariman Kurbanov	6.000	8.866		14.866	Q
3	(Italy) Gabriele Targhetta	5.900	8.933		14.833	Q
4	(Armenia) Mamikon Khachatryan	5.800	8.933		14.733	Q
5	(United States) Patrick Hoopes	6.100	8.566		14.666	Q
6	(South Korea) Hur Woong	5.900	8.733		14.633	Q
7	(Belgium) Kilan Van der Aa	5.700	8.900		14.600	Q
8	(Japan) Daiki Hashimoto	5.700	8.833		14.533	Q
9	(United Kingdom) Reuben Ward	5.700	8.766		14.466	R1
10	(Republic of Ireland) Rhys McClenaghan	5.800	8.600		14.400	R2
11	(Spain) Ignacio Yockers	5.800	8.500		14.300	R3

==== Rings ====
Rank	Gymnast	D Score	E Score	Pen.	Bon.	Total	Qual.
1	(China) Lan Xingyu	6.000	8.633		0.1	14.733	Q
2	(Russia) Ilia Zaika	5.700	8.833			14.533	Q
3	(United Kingdom) Courtney Tulloch	5.700	8.700		0.1	14.500	Q
4	(Armenia) Artur Avetisyan	5.400	8.833			14.233	Q
5	(Turkey) Mehmet Ayberk Koşak	5.500	8.633		0.1	14.233	Q
6	(Belgium) Glen Cuyle	5.400	8.600		0.1	14.100	Q
7	(Japan) Shinnosuke Oka	5.100	8.866		0.1	14.066	Q
8	(Greece) Eleftherios Petrounias	5.700	8.333			14.033	Q
9	(Azerbaijan) Nikita Simonov	5.300	8.600			13.900	R1
10	(United States) Kameron Nelson	5.500	8.233		0.1	13.833	R2
11	(Japan) Daiki Hashimoto	5.100	8.633			13.733	R3

==== Vault ====
Rank	Gymnast	Vault 1					Vault 2					Total	Qual.
Rank	Gymnast	D Score	E Score	Pen.	Bon.	Score 1	D Score	E Score	Pen.	Bon.	Score 2	Total	Qual.
1	(United Kingdom) Jake Jarman	5.600	9.300			14.900	5.200	9.166			14.366	14.633	Q
2	(Armenia) Artur Davtyan	5.200	9.266			14.466	5.200	9.600	-0.1	0.1	14.800	14.633	Q
3	(Ukraine) Nazar Chepurnyi	5.200	9.200			14.400	5.200	9.300			14.500	14.450	Q
4	(Russia) Arsenii Dukhno	5.200	9.100			14.300	5.200	9.200			14.400	14.350	Q
5	(Japan) Shohei Kawakami	5.200	9.100			14.300	5.200	9.066			14.266	14.283	Q
6	(Philippines) Carlos Yulo	5.200	8.800			14.000	5.200	9.333			14.533	14.266	Q
7	(Norway) Sebastian Sponevik	5.200	9.033			14.233	5.200	9.033			14.233	14.233	Q
8	(United Kingdom) Harry Hepworth	5.200	8.833			14.033	5.200	9.200			14.400	14.216	Q
9	(Belarus) Yahor Sharamkou	5.200	8.966			14.166	5.200	8.966			14.166	14.166	R1
10	(United States) Kameron Nelson	5.200	8.900			14.100	5.200	9.000			14.200	14.150	R2
11	(Italy) Simone Speranza	5.200	8.900			14.100	5.200	8.700	-0.1		13.800	13.950	R3

==== Parallel bars ====
Rank	Gymnast	D Score	E Score	Pen.	Bon.	Total	Qual.
1	(China) Zou Jingyuan	5.800	9.566		0.1	15.466	Q
2	(Croatia) Illia Kovtun	6.000	8.800		0.1	14.900	Q
3	(Japan) Shinnosuke Oka	5.600	9.166		0.1	14.866	Q
4	(Japan) Daiki Hashimoto	5.600	9.100		0.1	14.800	Q
5	(Japan) Shohei Kawakami	5.800	8.900		0.1	14.800	–
6	(Russia) Daniel Marinov	5.900	8.800			14.700	Q
7	(Russia) Arsenii Dukhno	5.600	8.900		0.1	14.600	Q
8	(Switzerland) Noe Seifert	5.900	8.700			14.600	Q
9	(Sweden) David Rumbutis	5.400	9.000		0.1	14.500	Q
10	(United Kingdom) Jake Jarman	5.400	8.966		0.1	14.466	R1
10	(United States) Shane Wiskus	5.400	8.966		0.1	14.466	R1
12	(China) Yang Haonan	5.600	8.766		0.1	14.466	R3

==== Horizontal bar ====
Rank	Gymnast	D Score	E Score	Pen.	Bon.	Total	Qual.
1	(Japan) Shohei Kawakami	6.300	8.300			14.600	Q
2	(Chinese Taipei) Tang Chia-hung	6.000	8.566			14.566	Q
3	(Japan) Shinnosuke Oka	5.800	8.700			14.500	Q
4	(Australia) Jesse Moore	5.600	8.666		0.1	14.366	Q
5	(Colombia) Ángel Barajas	6.300	7.933		0.1	14.333	Q
6	(Russia) Sergei Naidin	6.400	7.833			14.233	Q
7	(Colombia) Camilo Vera	5.600	8.566			14.166	Q
8	(Italy) Yumin Abbadini	5.900	8.266			14.166	Q
9	(United States) Fred Richard	5.800	8.333			14.133	R1
10	(Russia) Arsenii Dukhno	5.400	8.533		0.1	14.033	R2
11	(Canada) Félix Dolci	5.800	8.133		0.1	14.033	R3

=== Women ===
==== Team ====
Rank	Team	Vault (gymnastics)	Uneven bars	Balance beam	Floor (gymnastics)	Total	Qual.
1	China	42.032 (2)	41.232 (5)	43.966 (1)	37.766 (12)	164.996	Q
1	Du Siyu	14.166	13.233			164.996	Q
1	Ke Qinqin	14.266	14.133	13.900	12.400	164.996	Q
1	Qiu Qiyuan		13.333	14.966	12.800	164.996	Q
1	Zhang Yihan	13.600		13.266	10.800	164.996	Q
1	Zhang Qingying	13.133	13.766	15.100	12.566	164.996	Q
2	United States	42.133 (1)	41.965 (3)	40.499 (7)	39.932 (2)	164.529	Q
2	Skye Blakely	14.000	14.333	14.166	12.966	164.529	Q
2	Charleigh Bullock	14.100	13.566	13.033	12.800	164.529	Q
2	Dulcy Caylor			13.300		164.529	Q
2	Reese Esponda	13.866	12.966		13.633	164.529	Q
2	Claire Pease	14.033	14.066	13.000	13.333	164.529	Q
3	Russia	41.533 (5)	42.499 (1)	40.632 (6)	38.998 (5)	163.662	Q
3	Alena Glotova	13.100	14.400	13.666	12.766	163.662	Q
3	Milana Kaiumova		13.833	12.033	12.500	163.662	Q
3	Aleksandra Anufrieva	14.033			12.966	163.662	Q
3	Elizaveta Us	13.500	12.966	13.400		163.662	Q
3	Liudmila Roshchina	14.000	14.266	13.566	13.266	163.662	Q
4	Italy	40.799 (7)	42.332 (2)	41.633 (3)	37.666 (14)	162.430	Q
4	Manila Esposito			14.200	13.233	162.430	Q
4	Elisa Iorio	13.433	14.466			162.430	Q
4	July Marano	13.433	13.300	12.633	12.633	162.430	Q
4	Giulia Perotti	13.033	14.366	13.833	11.800	162.430	Q
4	Sofia Tonelli	13.900	13.500	13.600	11.700	162.430	Q
5	Japan	41.466 (6)	41.133 (6)	40.899 (5)	38.132 (10)	161.630	Q
5	Rina Kishi	14.000	13.400	13.633	12.466	161.630	Q
5	Haruka Nakamura				12.466	161.630	Q
5	Misa Nishiyama	12.233	13.933	12.666	12.566	161.630	Q
5	Mana Okamura	13.266	13.800	14.266		161.630	Q
5	Aiko Sugihara	14.200	11.966	13.000	13.100	161.630	Q
6	France	40.266 (13)	40.699 (7)	41.699 (2)	38.766 (6)	161.430	Q
6	Lorette Charpy	13.233	13.000	13.400	12.066	161.430	Q
6	Elena Colas	13.233	14.533	14.133	13.133	161.430	Q
6	Morgane Osyssek			13.666	12.333	161.430	Q
6	Maïana Prat	13.733	12.400	13.900	13.300	161.430	Q
6	Célia Serber	13.300	13.166			161.430	Q
7	Canada	41.966 (3)	39.799 (10)	38.266 (12)	40.099 (1)	160.130	Q
7	Ellie Black	14.100	13.433	12.800	13.133	160.130	Q
7	Gabrielle Black	13.600		12.066	13.300	160.130	Q
7	Coralie Demers		13.400			160.130	Q
7	Lia-Monica Fontaine	14.066	11.766	11.433	13.366	160.130	Q
7	Lia Redick	13.800	12.966	13.400	13.433	160.130	Q
8	Brazil	40.266 (13)	39.200 (12)	40.933 (4)	38.732 (7)	159.131	Q
8	Rebeca Andrade	14.400		13.033		159.131	Q
8	Thaís Fidélis		12.200	13.500	12.733	159.131	Q
8	Lorrane Oliveira	12.866	13.700	12.466	13.133	159.131	Q
8	Flávia Saraiva	13.000	13.300	14.400	12.866	159.131	Q
8	Sophia Weisberg	12.766	10.033		12.566	159.131	Q
9	Great Britain	41.800 (4)	40.232 (9)	37.099 (20)	39.832 (3)	158.963	R1
9	Becky Downie		14.066			158.963	R1
9	Ruby Evans	14.100	12.966	11.500	13.133	158.963	R1
9	Alice Kinsella	13.900	13.033	11.866	13.266	158.963	R1
9	Alia Leat	13.300		13.000	11.800	158.963	R1
9	Abigail Martin	13.800	13.133	12.233	13.433	158.963	R1
10	Germany	40.632 (8)	40.698 (8)	39.999 (9)	37.332 (15)	158.332	R2
10	Helen Kevric		14.766	13.633		158.332	R2
10	Emma Malewski	13.033	11.333	13.166	12.066	158.332	R2
10	Madita Mayr	13.266		13.166	12.533	158.332	R2
10	Lea Marie Quaas	13.500	13.166	13.200	12.033	158.332	R2
10	Karina Schönmaier	13.866	12.766		12.733	158.332	R2
11	Netherlands	39.466 (19)	41.932 (4)	39.698 (10)	36.933 (17)	158.029	R3
11	Vera Ubbink	12.833		13.166	11.800	158.029	R3
11	Vera van Pol	13.633	13.200	12.200	11.400	158.029	R3
11	Sanna Veerman	11.933	14.166		11.900	158.029	R3
11	Naomi Visser	13.000	14.466	13.266	11.900	158.029	R3
11	Sanne Wevers		13.300	13.266		158.029	R3
12	Australia	40.232 (16)	38.966 (14)	40.065 (8)	36.965 (16)	156.228	R4
12	Kate McDonald		13.133	13.066	11.733	156.228	R4
12	Ruby Pass	14.033	11.533	13.133	12.666	156.228	R4
12	Breanna Scott	13.133	13.133	13.866	12.566	156.228	R4
12	Lucy Stewart		12.700	12.966	11.600	156.228	R4
12	Emily Whitehead	13.066				156.228	R4

==== Individual all-around ====
Rank	Gymnast	Vault (gymnastics)	Uneven bars	Balance beam	Floor (gymnastics)	Total	Qual.
1	(Algeria) Kaylia Nemour	14.033	14.933	14.133	12.900	55.999	Q
2	(United States) Skye Blakely	14.000	14.333	14.166	12.966	55.465	Q
3	(Russia) Liudmila Roshchina	14.000	14.266	13.566	13.266	55.098	Q
4	(France) Elena Colas	13.233	14.533	14.133	13.133	55.032	Q
5	(China) Ke Qinqin	14.266	14.133	13.900	12.400	54.699	Q
6	(China) Zhang Qingying	13.133	13.766	15.100	12.566	54.565	Q
7	(United States) Claire Pease	14.033	14.066	13.000	13.333	54.432	Q
8	(Netherlands) Naomi Visser	13.000	14.466	13.266	13.233	51.965	Q
9	(Russia) Alena Glotova	13.100	14.400	13.666	12.766	51.865	Q
10	(Canada) Lia Redick	13.800	12.966	13.400	13.433	53.599	Q
11	(Spain) Alba Petisco	13.300	13.500	13.566	13.233	53.599	Q
12	(Brazil) Flávia Saraiva	13.000	13.300	14.400	12.866	53.566	Q
13	(Japan) Rina Kishi	14.000	13.400	13.633	12.466	53.499	Q
14	(United States) Charleigh Bullock	14.100	13.566	13.033	12.800	53.499	–
15	(Canada) Ellie Black	14.100	13.433	12.800	13.133	53.466	Q
16	(France) Maïana Prat	13.733	12.400	13.900	13.300	53.032	Q
17	(Italy) Giulia Perotti	13.033	14.366	13.833	11.800	53.032	Q
18	(Italy) Sofia Tonelli	13.900	13.500	13.600	11.700	52.700	Q
19	(Australia) Breanna Scott	13.133	13.133	13.866	12.566	52,698	Q
20	(United Kingdom) Abigail Martin	13.800	13.133	12.233	13.433	52.599	Q
21	(Japan) Aiko Sugihara	14.200	11.966	13.000	13.100	52.266	Q
22	(Brazil) Lorrane Oliveira	12.866	13.700	12.466	13.133	52.165	Q
23	(Belgium) Lisa Vaelen	14.000	13.366	11.766	12.933	52.065	Q
24	(United Kingdom) Alice Kinsella	13.900	13.033	11.866	13.266	52.065	Q
25	(Hungary) Gréta Mayer	13.333	12.733	13.333	12.600	51.999	Q
26	(Italy) July Marano	13.433	13.300	12.633	12.633	51.999	–
27	(Germany) Lea Marie Quaas	13.500	13.166	13.200	12.033	51.899	R1
28	(Switzerland) Lena Bickel	13.500	13.166	12.133	13.000	51.799	R2
29	(Ukraine) Kristina Hrudetska	13.000	13.566	12.933	12.233	51.732	R3
30	(United Kingdom) Ruby Evans	14.100	12.966	11.500	13.133	51.699	–
31	(France) Lorette Charpy	13.233	13.000	13.400	12.066	51.699	–
32	(Mexico) Michelle Pineda	12.900	12.500	13.233	13.066	51.699	R4

==== Vault ====
Rank	Gymnast	Vault 1				Vault 2				Bonus	Total	Qual.
Rank	Gymnast	D Score	E Score	Pen.	Score 1	D Score	E Score	Pen.	Score 2	Bonus	Total	Qual.
1	(Brazil) Rebeca Andrade	5.000	9.400		14.400	4.800	9.466		14.266	0.20	14.533	Q
2	(South Korea) Yeo Seo-jeong	5.400	9.166		14.566	5.000	9.000		14.000	0.20	14.483	Q
3	(United States) Claire Pease	5.600	8.533	-0.1	14.033	5.000	9.133		14.133	0.20	14.283	Q
4	(Canada) Lia-Monica Fontaine	5.000	9.066		14.066	4.800	8.933		13.733	0.20	14.099	Q
5	(United States) Skye Blakely	5.000	9.000		14.000	4.800	8.933		13.733	0.20	14.066	Q
6	(Canada) Ellie Black	4.800	9.300		14.100	4.400	8.966		13.366	0.20	13.933	Q
7	(United Kingdom) Abigail Martin	5.000	8.800		13.800	4.800	8.700		13.500	0.20	13.850	Q
8	(Mexico) Victoria Mata	5.400	8.733		14.133	4.200	8.900		13.100	0.20	13.816	Q
9	(Belgium) Lisa Vaelen	5.400	8.600		14.000	4.800	8.433		13.233	0.20	13.816	R1
10	(Russia) Aleksandra Anufrieva	5.400	8.633		14.033	4.400	8.766		13.166	0.20	13.799	R2
11	(Czech Republic) Alice Vlková	4.600	8.900		13.500	4.400	8.800		13.200	0.20	13.550	R3

==== Uneven bars ====
Rank	Gymnast	D Score	E Score	Pen.	Total	Qual.
1	(Algeria) Kaylia Nemour	7.100	7.833		14.933	Q
2	(Germany) Helen Kevric	6.400	8.366		14.766	Q
3	(France) Elena Colas	6.300	8.233		14.533	Q
4	(Italy) Elisa Iorio	6.300	8.166		14.466	Q
4	(Netherlands) Naomi Visser	6.300	8.166		14.466	Q
6	(Russia) Alena Glotova	6.200	8.200		14.400	Q
7	(Italy) Giulia Perotti	6.200	8.166		14.366	Q
8	(United States) Skye Blakely	6.200	8.133		14.333	Q
9	(Russia) Liudmila Roshchina	6.500	7.766		14.266	R1
10	(Netherlands) Sanna Veerman	6.300	7.866		14.166	R2
11	(China) Ke Qinqin	5.900	8.233		14.133	R3

==== Balance beam ====
Rank	Gymnast	D Score	E Score	Pen.	Total	Qual.
1	(China) Zhang Qingying	6.800	8.300		15.100	Q
2	(China) Qiu Qiyuan	6.500	8.466		14.966	Q
3	(Brazil) Flávia Saraiva	6.100	8.300		14.400	Q
4	(Japan) Mana Okamura	6.000	8.266		14.266	Q
5	(Italy) Manila Esposito	5.800	8.400		14.200	Q
6	(United States) Skye Blakely	6.200	7.966		14.166	Q
7	(France) Elena Colas	5.800	8.333		14.133	Q
8	(Algeria) Kaylia Nemour	6.200	7.933		14.133	Q
9	(South Korea) Hwang Seo-hyun	6.000	7.933		13.933	R1
10	(France) Maïana Prat	6.100	7.900	-0.1	13.900	R2
11	(China) Ke Qinqin	6.300	7.600		13.900	–
12	(Australia) Breanna Scott	5.800	8.066		13.866	R3

==== Floor exercise ====
Rank	Gymnast	D Score	E Score	Pen.	Total	Qual.
1	(United States) Reese Esponda	6.000	7.733	-0.1	13.633	Q
2	(Canada) Lia Redick	5.400	8.033		13.433	Q
3	(United Kingdom) Abigail Martin	5.800	7.733	-0.1	13.433	Q
4	(Canada) Lia-Monica Fontaine	5.700	7.666		13.366	Q
5	(United States) Claire Pease	6.000	7.633	-0.3	13.333	Q
6	(Canada) Gabrielle Black	5.300	8.000		13.300	–
7	(France) Maïana Prat	5.600	7.700		13.300	Q
8	(United Kingdom) Alice Kinsella	5.400	7.866		13.266	Q
9	(Russia) Liudmila Roshchina	5.800	7.466		13.266	Q
10	(Italy) Manila Esposito	5.600	7.733	-0.1	13.233	R1
11	(Netherlands) Naomi Visser	5.500	7.733		13.233	R2
12	(Spain) Alba Petisco	5.700	7.533		13.233	R3

== Participating nations ==
A total of 452 gymnasts from 82 nations participated in the World Championships in Rotterdam.

- Albania (1)
- Algeria (6)
- Argentina (9)
- Armenia (4)
- Australia (12)
- Austria (3)
- Azerbaijan (4)
- Belarus (8)
- Belgium (12)
- Brazil (12)
- Bulgaria (4)
- Canada (12)
- Chile (5)
- China (12)
- Chinese Taipei (10)
- Colombia (7)
- Costa Rica (3)
- Croatia (5)
- Cyprus (5)
- Czech Republic (8)
- Denmark (1)
- Dominican Republic (2)
- Ecuador (2)
- Egypt (7)
- El Salvador (1)
- Finland (4)
- France (12)
- Georgia (2)
- Germany (12)
- Great Britain (12)
- Greece (7)
- Guatemala (2)
- Honduras (1)
- Hong Kong (2)
- Hungary (9)
- Iceland (4)
- India (1)
- Indonesia (1)
- Iran (1)
- Ireland (7)
- Israel (9)
- Italy (12)
- Jamaica (2)
- Japan (12)
- Kazakhstan (6)
- Liechtenstein (1)
- Lithuania (1)
- Luxembourg (2)
- Malaysia (6)
- Malta (1)
- Mexico (7)
- Mongolia (1)
- Morocco (2)
- Myanmar (1)
- Netherlands (11)
- New Zealand (4)
- Norway (6)
- Panama (4)
- Peru (3)
- Philippines (4)
- Poland (2)
- Portugal (3)
- Puerto Rico (3)
- Qatar (1)
- Romania (7)
- Russia (12)
- Serbia (1)
- Singapore (3)
- Slovakia (1)
- Slovenia (8)
- South Africa (4)
- South Korea (12)
- Spain (12)
- Sweden (7)
- Switzerland (12)
- Thailand (1)
- Tunisia (1)
- Turkey (7)
- Ukraine (10)
- United States (12)
- Uzbekistan (5)
- Zimbabwe (1)

== Controversies ==
=== Russian visa situation ===
In May 2026, World Gymnastics lifted all restrictions against Russian and Belarusian athletes, allowing them to represent their country instead of competing as Authorised Neutral Athletes. However, at the 2026 Rhythmic Gymnastics World Cup in Cluj-Napoca, organizers refused to display the Russian flag or play the Russian national anthem after Cluj-Napoca mayor, Emil Boc, said they were not allowed. As a result, World Gymnastics announced that while Russian and Belarusian athletes must be permitted to participate, the local government could dictate whether or not to use Russian and Belarusian flags, anthems, and other national emblems. The Dutch government announced that they would implement all measures related to the ban on the use of national flags, anthems, state symbols and other national symbols of Russia and Belarus during the World Championships. Despite this, World Gymnastics said they would still refer to them as Russia and Belarus in all official communications and on the official results.

Two days before the Russian delegation's scheduled departure, the Netherlands had not yet granted them visas. The Belarusian delegation had been granted visas without issue.

On October 12, only five days before the official start date, one registered women's team member, Alyona Glotova, received her visa and two registered men's team members, Arsenii Dukhno and Sergei Naidin, received theirs. Daniel Marinov, who has dual citizenship with Bulgaria, was able to travel to the Netherlands using his Bulgarian passport.

On October 13, the Netherlands officially denied visas for registered women's team members Angelina Melnikova, Viktoria Listunova, and Anna Kalmykova. Their cited reasoning for the denials was that "one or more Schengen Area member states consider the athletes a threat to their international relations". They approved visas for registered athletes Ilia Zaika, Savelii Sieedin, Lyudmila Roshchina, and Milana Kaiumova. Elizaveta Us, who was originally not part of the registered team, was granted a visa.

On October 14, men's team traveling alternate Mukhammadzhon Yakubov was granted a visa. Zlata Osokina, who like Us was not a part of the original registered team, was also granted a visa.

On October 15, Aleksandra Anufrieva, who like Us and Osokina was not originally part of the registered team, was granted a visa, officially filling out the final spot for the women's team.

== See also ==
- 2026 European Women's Artistic Gymnastics Championships § Controversies
- 2025 World Artistic Gymnastics Championships § Controversies
- 1974 World Artistic Gymnastics Championships § Controversies
