= Liudmila Roshchina =

Russian artistic gymnast (born 2008)

- Людмила Рощина
- Full name: Liudmila Arkadyevna Roshchina
- Alternative name: Lyudmila Roshchina
- Born: 24 January 2008 (age 18) Anapa, Russia

Gymnastics career
- Discipline: Women's artistic gymnastics
- Country represented: Russia; (2020–present)
Medal record
Representing Russia & (Individual Neutral Athletes) AIN
World Championships
Silver medal – second place	2026 Rotterdam	All-Around
European Championships
Gold medal – first place	2026 Zagreb	Team
FIG World Cup
Event / 1st / 2nd / 3rd; Apparatus World Cup / 2 / 1 / 0

Liudmila Arkadyevna Roshchina (Russian: Людмила Аркадьевна Рощина; born 24 January 2008) is a Russian artistic gymnast. She is the 2026 World all-around silver medalist. She is also a two-time Russian national silver medalist in the all-around (2024, 2025), the 2024 national champion on uneven bars and the 2025 national bronze medalist on uneven bars and balance beam.

== Gymnastics career ==
=== 2024 ===
At the 2024 Russian Championships, Roshchina won the all-around silver medal behind Angelina Melnikova. She then won the gold medal in the uneven bars final, ahead of Olympic champions Viktoria Listunova and Melnikova. She also won the uneven bars title at the 2024 Russian Cup, where she also won the floor exercise silver medal. At the 2024 Voronin Cup, she won the all-around silver medal, behind Anna Kalmykova. She then won the gold medal in the uneven bars final and the silver medal in the floor exercise final.

=== 2025 ===
At the 2025 Strongest Athletes Cup, Roshchina won gold medals in the all-around and on every apparatus except for the balance beam. Then at the 2025 Russian Championships, she won the all-around silver medal, and she also won bronze medals on the uneven bars and balance beam.

Roshchina competed as an Individual Neutral Athlete (AIN) at the 2025 World Championships. She qualified for and competed in the all-around final, finishing in eleventh place. Roshchina also placed eighth on uneven bars in the qualification round, but was unable to participate in the final due to the two-per-country rule, as Angelina Melnikova and Leila Vasileva qualified ahead of her.

=== 2026 ===
Roshchina began 2026 competing at the World Cups in Cottbus and Antalya. At the latter she won gold on vault and floor exercise and silver on the uneven bars. At the 2026 Russian Cup she placed second in the all-around behind Anna Kalmykova and won gold on floor exercise.

She was selected to compete at the 2026 European Championships in Zagreb, Croatia alongside Kalmykova, Angelina Melnikova, Viktoria Listunova (replaced by Alyona Glotova), and Elizaveta Us. Together they won team gold.

Roshchina was selected to represent Russia at the 2026 World Championships alongside Melnikova, Kalmykova, Listunova, and Glotova. Two days before the Russian delegation's scheduled departure, the Netherlands had not yet granted them visas. Three days before the official start date of the competition, Roshchina's visa was approved but those of Melnikova, Listunova, and Kalmykova were denied. At the competition, the Russian team (consisting of Roshchina, Glotova, Us, Milana Kaiumova, and Aleksandra Anufrieva) qualified to the team final in third place. Individually Roshchina qualified to the all-around and floor exercise finals. During the team final, the Russian team counted numerous falls and finished sixth. During the all-around final Roshchina hit all four of the events and won the silver medal behind Skye Blakely. During the floor exercise final she finished seventh.

== Competitive history ==
Competitive history of Liudmila Roshchina
Year	Event	Team	AA	VT	UB	BB	FX
2021	Spartakiade		1st place, gold medalist(s)	2nd place, silver medalist(s)			1st place, gold medalist(s)
2022	Russian Championships		3rd place, bronze medalist(s)	3rd place, bronze medalist(s)	4	7	1st place, gold medalist(s)
2022	Spartakiade	8	10				
2023	Russian Junior Championships		3rd place, bronze medalist(s)	4	4	3rd place, bronze medalist(s)	1st place, gold medalist(s)
2023	Minsk Friendly	1st place, gold medalist(s)	1st place, gold medalist(s)				
2023	Russian Cup		12		6		5
2023	Kazan Friendly	1st place, gold medalist(s)	1st place, gold medalist(s)	3rd place, bronze medalist(s)	1st place, gold medalist(s)		2nd place, silver medalist(s)
2024	Russian Championships	3rd place, bronze medalist(s)	2nd place, silver medalist(s)		1st place, gold medalist(s)		
2024	Russian Cup		5		1st place, gold medalist(s)		2nd place, silver medalist(s)
2024	Belarus Open Cup		2nd place, silver medalist(s)			2nd place, silver medalist(s)	1st place, gold medalist(s)
2024	Voronin Cup		2nd place, silver medalist(s)		1st place, gold medalist(s)		2nd place, silver medalist(s)
2025	Gymnastics Legends	1st place, gold medalist(s)	1st place, gold medalist(s)				2nd place, silver medalist(s)
2025	Russian Cup	2nd place, silver medalist(s)	3rd place, bronze medalist(s)	2nd place, silver medalist(s)	4	6	2nd place, silver medalist(s)
2025	Strongest Athletes Cup		1st place, gold medalist(s)	1st place, gold medalist(s)	1st place, gold medalist(s)		1st place, gold medalist(s)
2025	Russian Championships	3rd place, bronze medalist(s)	2nd place, silver medalist(s)	4	3rd place, bronze medalist(s)	3rd place, bronze medalist(s)	4
2025	World Championships	—N/a	11				
2025	Voronin Cup	1st place, gold medalist(s)	1st place, gold medalist(s)	3rd place, bronze medalist(s)	2nd place, silver medalist(s)	3rd place, bronze medalist(s)	1st place, gold medalist(s)
2026	Cottbus World Cup			5			
2026	Antalya World Cup			1st place, gold medalist(s)	2nd place, silver medalist(s)	4	1st place, gold medalist(s)
2026	Russian Cup	2nd place, silver medalist(s)	2nd place, silver medalist(s)	4	4	2nd place, silver medalist(s)	1st place, gold medalist(s)
2026	Russian Championships	2nd place, silver medalist(s)	2nd place, silver medalist(s)	2nd place, silver medalist(s)	1st place, gold medalist(s)	2nd place, silver medalist(s)	1st place, gold medalist(s)
2026	European Championships	1st place, gold medalist(s)					
2026	World Championships	6	2nd place, silver medalist(s)		R1		7
