= 2024 Voronin Cup =

Mikhail Voronin Cup
- Location: Moscow, Russia
- Date: December 7–8, 2024

The 2024 Mikhail Voronin Cup took place on December 7–8 in Moscow, Russia.

== Medal winners ==
=== Women ===
Event	Gold	Silver	Bronze
Team all-around	Russia; Angelina Melnikova; Viktoria Listunova; Ksenia Zeliaeva; Vitalina Shevchuk	(Russia) Dynamo; Anna Kalmykova; Alena Glotova; Diana Gainulina; Alina Iarina	Belarus; Alena Tsitavets; Maryia Sasinovich; Ulyana Kuzmenkova; Krystsina Halkouskaya
Senior
Individual all-around	(Russia) Anna Kalmykova	(Russia) Liudmila Roshchina	(Belarus) Maryia Sasinovich
Vault	(Russia) Angelina Melnikova	(Kazakhstan) Darya Yassinskaya	(Russia) Anna Kalmykova
Uneven Bars	(Russia) Liudmila Roshchina	(Belarus) Alena Tsitavets	(Russia) Anna Kalmykova
Balance Beam	(Russia) Anna Kalmykova	(Russia) Angelina Melnikova	(Syria) Aleksandra Maksimova
Floor Exercise	(Russia) Viktoria Listunova	(Russia) Liudmila Roshchina	(Uzbekistan) Jasmina Makhmudova
Junior
Individual all-around	(Russia) Diana Gainulina	(Russia) Vitalina Shevchuk	(China) Li Rongjinyi
Vault	(Russia) Vitalina Shevchuk	(Belarus) Ulyana Kuzmenkova	(Russia) Diana Gainulina
Uneven Bars	(Russia) Ksenia Zelyaeva	(Russia) Vitalina Shevchuk	(Belarus) Krystsina Halkouskaya
Balance Beam	(Russia) Diana Gainulina	(Russia) Aleksandra Iskakova	(China) Li Rongjinyi
Floor Exercise	(Russia) Diana Gainulina	(Russia) Vitalina Shevchuk	(China) Qin Ziyue

=== Men ===
Event	Gold	Silver	Bronze
Team all-around	Russia; Saveliy Sieedin; Kirill Gashkov; Timofei Akinshin; Arseniy Dukhno	Armenia; Artur Davtyan; Hamlet Manukyan; Mamikon Khachatryan	(Russia) Dynamo; Evgeniy Kisel; Mukhammadzhon Iakubov; Mikhail Novikov; Iaroslav Sukharev
Senior
Individual all-around	(Armenia) Artur Davtyan	(Russia) Ivan Kuliak	(Belarus) Saveliy Sieedin
Floor exercise	(Kazakhstan) Assan Salimov	(Armenia) Artur Davtyan	(Russia) Mukhammadzhon Yakubov
Pommel horse	(Kazakhstan) Zeinolla Idrissov	(Armenia) Artur Davtyan	(Russia) Vladislav Poliashov
Rings	(Russia) Grigorii Klimentev	(Armenia) Artur Davtyan	(Russia) Oleg Stupkin
Vault	(Armenia) Artur Davtyan	(Russia) Mukhammadzhon Yakubov	(Russia) Evgeniy Kisel
Parallel bars	(Russia) Ivan Kuliak	(Russia) Saveliy Syedin	(Turkey) Volkan Arda Hamarat
Horizontal bar	(Russia) Alexey Rostov	(Russia) Ivan Kuliak	(Belarus) Bahdan Ilyinkou
Junior
Individual all-around	(Russia) Arseniy Dukhno	(Russia) Evgeniy Polennikova	(Armenia) Hamlet Manukyan
Floor exercise	(Russia) Arseniy Dukhno	(Kazakhstan) Nurtan Idrissov	(Armenia) Hamlet Manukyan
Pommel horse	(Armenia) Hamlet Manukyan	(Armenia) Mamikon Khachatryan	(Russia) Arseniy Dukhno
Rings	(Armenia) Hamlet Manukyan	(Russia) Evgeniy Polennikov	(Kazakhstan) Nurtan Idrissov
Vault	(Russia) Arseniy Dukhno	(Russia) Evgeniy Polennikov	(Kazakhstan) Andrey Terman
Parallel bars	(Russia) Evgeniy Polennikov	(Kazakhstan) Nurtan Idrissov	(Turkey) Ege Ertöz
Horizontal bar	(Russia) Aleksei Zelenskiy	(Armenia) Hamlet Manukyan	(Russia) Aleksandr Vasilev
