= Gymnastics at the 2026 Asian Games – Women's vault =

Women's vault at the 2026 Asian Games
- Venue: Nippon Gaishi Hall Rainbow Hall
- Date: 22 September 2026 (Qualification); 24 September 2026 (Final)
- Competitors: 8 from 7 nations

Medalists
gold medal	Yeo Seo-jeong	South Korea
silver medal	An Chang-ok	North Korea
bronze medal	Du Siyu	China

The women's vault competition at the 2026 Asian Games took place on 24 September 2026 at Nippon Gaishi Hall Rainbow Hall.

== Schedule ==
All times are Japan Standard Time (UTC+09:00)

Date	Time	Event
Tuesday, 22 September 2026	12:00	Qualification
Thursday, 24 September 2026	17:55	Final

== Qualification ==
Rank	Gymnast	Vault 1				Vault 2				Bonus	Total	Qual.
Rank	Gymnast	D Score	E Score	Pen.	Score 1	D Score	E Score	Pen.	Score 2	Bonus	Total	Qual.
1	Yeo Seo-jeong (KOR)	5.4	8.900		14.300	5.0	9.233		14.233	0.2	14.466	Q
2	An Chang-ok (PRK)	5.6	8.400		14.000	5.0	8.500	-0.1	13.400	0.2	13.900	Q
3	Du Siyu (CHN)	5.0	8.800		13.800	4.0	8.666		12.666	0.2	13.433	Q
4	Oksana Chusovitina (UZB)	4.4	8.966		13.366	4.0	8.766		12.766	0.2	13.266	Q
5	Nguyen Thị Quỳnh Như (VIE)	5.2	8.633		13.833	4.0	8.466	-0.3	12.166	0.2	13.199	Q
6	Yeap Kang Xian (MAS)	4.2	8.733		12.933	4.0	8.766		12.766	0.2	13.049	Q
7	Pranati Nayak (IND)	4.4	8.600		13.000	4.0	8.433		12.433	0.2	12.916	Q
8	Marissa Zaiful Azian (MAS)	4.4	8.433		12.833	3.8	8.666		12.466	0.2	12.849	Q
9	Joanne Chen Hoi Yuen (HKG)	4.4	8.533	-0.1	12.833	4.0	8.466		12.466	0.2	12.849	R1
10	Darya Yassinskaya (KAZ)	4.0	8.400		12.400	4.2	8.600		12.800	0.2	12.800	R2
11	Haylee Garcia (PHI)	4.2	8.700		12.900	4.4	8.233		12.633		12.766	R3

== Final ==
Rank	Gymnast	Vault 1				Vault 2				Bonus	Total
Rank	Gymnast	D Score	E Score	Pen.	Score 1	D Score	E Score	Pen.	Score 2	Bonus	Total
1st place, gold medalist(s)	Yeo Seo-jeong (KOR)	5.4	9.066		14.466	5.0	9.100		14.100	0.2	14.483
2nd place, silver medalist(s)	An Chang-ok (PRK)	5.6	8.700		14.300	5.4	7.933	-0.3	13.033		13.666
3rd place, bronze medalist(s)	Du Siyu (CHN)	5.0	8.700		13.700	4.0	8.800		12.800	0.2	13.450
4	Nguyen Thị Quỳnh Như (VIE)	5.2	8.433		13.633	4.0	8.866		12.866	0.2	13.449
5	Oksana Chusovitina (UZB)	4.0	8.733		12.733	4.4	8.866		13.266	0.2	13.199
6	Pranati Nayak (IND)	4.4	8.500		12.900	4.4	8.500		12.900	0.2	13.100
7	Yeap Kang Xian (MAS)	4.2	8.666		12.866	4.0	8.700		12.700	0.2	12.983
8	Marissa Zaiful Azian (MAS)	4.4	8.333	-0.1	12.633	3.8	8.633		12.433	0.2	12.733
