= Anna Kalmykova =

Russian artistic gymnast (born 2008)

- Анна Калмыкова
- Full name: Anna Dmitriyevna Kalmykova
- Born: 22 August 2008 (age 18)

Gymnastics career
- Discipline: Women's artistic gymnastics
- Country represented: Russia; (2021–present)
Medal record
Representing Russia & (Individual Neutral Athletes) AIN
European Championships
Gold medal – first place	2026 Zagreb	Team
Silver medal – second place	2026 Zagreb	All-around
FIG World Cup
Event / 1st / 2nd / 3rd; Apparatus World Cup / 3 / 1 / 0

Anna Dmitriyevna Kalmykova (Russian: Анна Дмитриевна Калмыкова; born 22 August 2008) is a Russian artistic gymnast. She is the 2026 Russian national champion.

== Gymnastics career ==
=== 2020–2022 ===
Kalmykova won the bronze medal in the junior all-around at the 2020 WOGA Classic, behind Skye Blakely and Mana Okamura. She won the all-around competition at the 2021 Russian Junior Championships in the Candidate Master of Sport category. At the 2022 Russian Championships, she placed sixth in the junior all-around and won the balance beam title.

=== 2024 ===
Kalmykova became age-eligible for senior competitions in 2024. She won a gold medal with the Moscow team at the 2024 Russian Championships, but she withdrew from the all-around final due to a leg injury on her uneven bars dismount. She returned to competition at the 2024 BRICS Games, she won the all-around silver medal, behind Leila Vasileva. She then won the gold medals in both the vault and floor exercise finals. In August, she won the all-around title at the Russian Cup. She also won gold medals in the vault and balance beam finals. She won another all-around competition at the 2024 Voronin Cup. Additionally, she won a gold medal on the balance beam and bronze medals on vault and uneven bars.

=== 2025 ===
Kalmykova was granted status as an Individual Neutral Athlete (AIN) in March 2025. She won gold medals in the all-around, vault, and floor exercise at the 2025 Russian Cup. At the 2025 Russian Championships, she won gold medals on the vault and balance beam and a silver medal on the floor exercise. She was then selected to compete at the 2025 World Gymnastics Championships. In the qualification round, she competed on vault, balance beam, and floor exercise. She qualified for and competed in the vault final, ultimately finishing in sixth place.

=== 2026 ===
Kalmykova began 2026 competing at the World Cups in Cottbus and Baku, winning gold on vault and floor exercise at the former and gold on vault and silver on floor exercise at the latter. At the 2026 Russian Cup she won the all-around and placed top three on all four apparatuses.

She was selected to compete at the 2026 European Championships in Zagreb, Croatia alongside Angelina Melnikova, Liudmila Roshchina, Viktoria Listunova, and Elizaveta Us. However, a week before the start of the competition, the Croatian government denied visas for Kalmykova as well as Melnikova and Listunova, preventing them from competing. Days later, after the Russian Ministry of Foreign Affairs worked with the Croatian Gymnastics Union as well as European Gymnastics, Melnikova and Kalmykova were granted visas; Listunova's visa was still denied and she was replaced with Alyona Glotova. On the first day of competition, Kalmykova won the silver medal in the all-around behind Melnikova. During event finals, Kalmykova placed fifth on vault and uneven bars and seventh on balance beam. On the final day of competition, she helped the Russian team win gold.

Kalmykova was selected to represent Russia at the 2026 World Championships. Four days before the official start date of the competition, the Netherlands denied her visa along with those of Melnikova and Listunova.

== Competitive history ==
Competitive history of Anna Kalmykova
Year	Event	Team	AA	VT	UB	BB	FX
2019	Reykjavik International Games		1st place, gold medalist(s)	2nd place, silver medalist(s)	1st place, gold medalist(s)	2nd place, silver medalist(s)	1st place, gold medalist(s)
2019	WOGA Classic		12				
2020	WOGA Classic		3rd place, bronze medalist(s)				
2021	Russian Junior Championships		1st place, gold medalist(s)	1st place, gold medalist(s)	2nd place, silver medalist(s)	1st place, gold medalist(s)	1st place, gold medalist(s)
2021	Spartakiade				5		
2022	Russian Championships		6	2nd place, silver medalist(s)	3rd place, bronze medalist(s)	1st place, gold medalist(s)	4
2023	Russian Cup		8	6			
2023	Kazan Friendly	1st place, gold medalist(s)	2nd place, silver medalist(s)	1st place, gold medalist(s)		1st place, gold medalist(s)	1st place, gold medalist(s)
2024	Russian Championships	1st place, gold medalist(s)			7		6
2024	Russian Cup		1st place, gold medalist(s)	1st place, gold medalist(s)	5	1st place, gold medalist(s)	3rd place, bronze medalist(s)
2024	Voronin Cup	2nd place, silver medalist(s)	1st place, gold medalist(s)	3rd place, bronze medalist(s)	3rd place, bronze medalist(s)	1st place, gold medalist(s)	
2025	Gymnastics Legends		2nd place, silver medalist(s)	1st place, gold medalist(s)		2nd place, silver medalist(s)	1st place, gold medalist(s)
2025	Russian Cup	1st place, gold medalist(s)	1st place, gold medalist(s)	1st place, gold medalist(s)	6	3rd place, bronze medalist(s)	1st place, gold medalist(s)
2025	Strongest Athletes Cup		2nd place, silver medalist(s)	2nd place, silver medalist(s)		2nd place, silver medalist(s)	2nd place, silver medalist(s)
2025	Russian Championships	2nd place, silver medalist(s)	6	1st place, gold medalist(s)	5	1st place, gold medalist(s)	2nd place, silver medalist(s)
2025	World Championships	—N/a		6			
2026	Cottbus World Cup			1st place, gold medalist(s)			1st place, gold medalist(s)
2026	Baku World Cup			1st place, gold medalist(s)	5		2nd place, silver medalist(s)
2026	Russian Cup	1st place, gold medalist(s)	1st place, gold medalist(s)	1st place, gold medalist(s)	2nd place, silver medalist(s)	1st place, gold medalist(s)	3rd place, bronze medalist(s)
2026	Russian Championships	1st place, gold medalist(s)	1st place, gold medalist(s)		2nd place, silver medalist(s)	1st place, gold medalist(s)	2nd place, silver medalist(s)
2026	European Championships	1st place, gold medalist(s)	2nd place, silver medalist(s)	5	5	7	
