= Elizaveta Us =

Russian artistic gymnast

- Елизавета Ус
- Born: January 11, 2007 (age 19)

Gymnastics career
- Discipline: Women's artistic gymnastics
- Country represented: Russia
Medal record
Representing Russia
European Championships
| Gold medal – first place | 2026 Zagreb | Team |

Elizaveta Us (Russian: Елизавета Владимировна Ус; born 11 January 2007) is a Russian artistic gymnast. She was part of the gold medal–winning team at the 2026 European Championships.

== Gymnastics career ==
She is the 2025 Russian national bronze medalist on vault and the 2026 bronze medalist on vault and balance beam.

Us was selected to compete at the 2026 European Championships in Zagreb, Croatia alongside Anna Kalmykova, Angelina Melnikova, Viktoria Listunova (replaced by Alyona Glotova after failing to secure a visa), and Liudmila Roshchina. Together they won team gold.

Us was originally not selected to represent Russia at the 2026 World Championships. However, three days before the official start date of the competition, the Netherlands denied visas for Melnikova, Listunova, and Kalmykova. Since Russia anticipated possible visa issues, they applied for visas for multiple of their gymnasts beyond the ones registered for the competition. Us's visa was granted along with those of Roshchina, Glotova, and Milana Kaiumova.

== Competitive history ==
Competitive history of Elizaveta Us
| Year | Event | Team | AA | VT | UB | BB | FX |
|---|---|---|---|---|---|---|---|
| 2026 | European Championships | 1st place, gold medalist(s) | | | | | |
| 2026 | World Championships | 6 | | | | | |
