= Du Siyu =

Chinese artistic gymnast

- Born: 8 November 2002 (age 23) Anhui, China

Gymnastics career
- Discipline: Women's artistic gymnastics
- Country represented: China; (2018–present)
Medal record
World Championships
Gold medal – first place	2026 Rotterdam	Team
Bronze medal – third place	2018 Doha	Team
Asian Games
Gold medal – first place	2026 Aichi-Nagoya	Team
Bronze medal – third place	2026 Aichi-Nagoya	Vault
World University Games
Gold medal – first place	2021 Chengdu	Team
Gold medal – first place	2021 Chengdu	Uneven bars
Asian Championships
Gold medal – first place	2026 Zunyi	Team
Silver medal – second place	2026 Zunyi	Uneven bars
FIG World Cup
Event / 1st / 2nd / 3rd; Apparatus World Cup / 1 / 0 / 1

Du Siyu (Chinese: 杜思雨; born 8 November 2002 in Anhui) is a Chinese artistic gymnast. She was part of the gold medal winning team at the 2026 World Championships, and is a 2018 world bronze medallist in the team competition (as an alternate on the Chinese team).

== Biography ==
She debuted at the senior level at the 2018 Melbourne World Cup, winning gold on uneven bars and bronze on balance beam.

At the 2018 World Artistic Gymnastics Championships in Doha, Qatar, she was the alternate on the Chinese team and was awarded a bronze medal for the team competition.

In 2023, she was chosen for the 2021 Summer World University Games held in Chengdu, China along with Ou Yushan, Wei Xiaoyuan, Luo Huan, and Zhang Jin. The Chinese team won gold in the team event, and Du contributing vault and bars scores. In addition, she qualified to the bars final in first position with a score of 14.366 along with teammate Luo Huan. She finished the final in 1st with a score of 13.833 and ended the Universiade with 2 gold medals.

After competing only domestically in 2025, Du was named to the Chinese team for the 2026 Asian Championships. China won gold ahead of Japan and South Korea. Individually, Du qualified for the uneven bars final, where she won the silver medal behind teammate Qiu Qiyuan.

Du was represented China at the 2026 Asian Games. The Chinese team once again won gold in the team final, and Du won the bronze medal on vault behind Yeo Seo-jeong of South Korea and An Chang-ok of North Korea.

In August of 2026, Du was officially named to the Chinese team for the 2026 World Championships, with teammates Qiu Qiyuan, Zhang Qingying, Ke Qinqin, and Zhang Yihan. At the 2026 World Championships, Du helped China qualify to the team final in first place. During the team final, Du competed on vault and uneven bars, helping China win their first World team gold in twenty years and ending the United States's gold medal winning streak they've had since 2011.

== Competitive history ==
Competitive history of Du Siyu
Year	Event	Team	AA	VT	UB	BB	FX
2017	National Games	2nd place, silver medalist(s)			2nd place, silver medalist(s)		
2018	Melbourne World Cup				1st place, gold medalist(s)	3rd place, bronze medalist(s)	
2018	Doha World Cup				5		
2018	National Championships	2nd place, silver medalist(s)	6		5		
2018	Chinese Individual Championships				2nd place, silver medalist(s)		
2018	World Championships	(bronze) (Note: Du was the team alternate.)					
2019	National Championships	2nd place, silver medalist(s)					
2019	Chinese Individual Championships		7		2nd place, silver medalist(s)		
2020	National Championships	2nd place, silver medalist(s)					
2021	National Championships	2nd place, silver medalist(s)					
2021	National Games	3rd place, bronze medalist(s)					
2023	Chinese Championships	4	10		4		
2023	World University Games	1st place, gold medalist(s)			1st place, gold medalist(s)		
2026	Chinese Championships	8		1st place, gold medalist(s)	4		
2026	Asian Championships	1st place, gold medalist(s)		5	2nd place, silver medalist(s)		
2026	Asian Games	1st place, gold medalist(s)		3rd place, bronze medalist(s)			
2026	World Championships	1st place, gold medalist(s)					
