= Aleksandra Anufrieva =

Russian artistic gymnast

- Born: March 28, 2010 (age 16)

Gymnastics career
- Discipline: Women's artistic gymnastics
- Country represented: Russia

Aleksandra Anufrieva (Russian: Александра Ивановна Ануфриева; born 28 March 2010) is a Russian artistic gymnast.

== Career ==
=== 2025 ===
At the 2025 Russian Junior Artistic Gymnastics Championships, she won gold on vault.

=== 2026 ===
At the Russian Artistic Gymnastics Championships, held from 28 June to 6 July 2026, Anufrieva won gold on vault and bronze on floor.

She will be part of the Russian team at the 2026 World Championships.

== Competitive history ==
Competitive history of Aleksandra Anufrieva
Year	Event	Team	AA	VT	UB	BB	FX
2026	World Championships	6		R2			
