= Glen Cuyle =

Belgian artistic gymnast

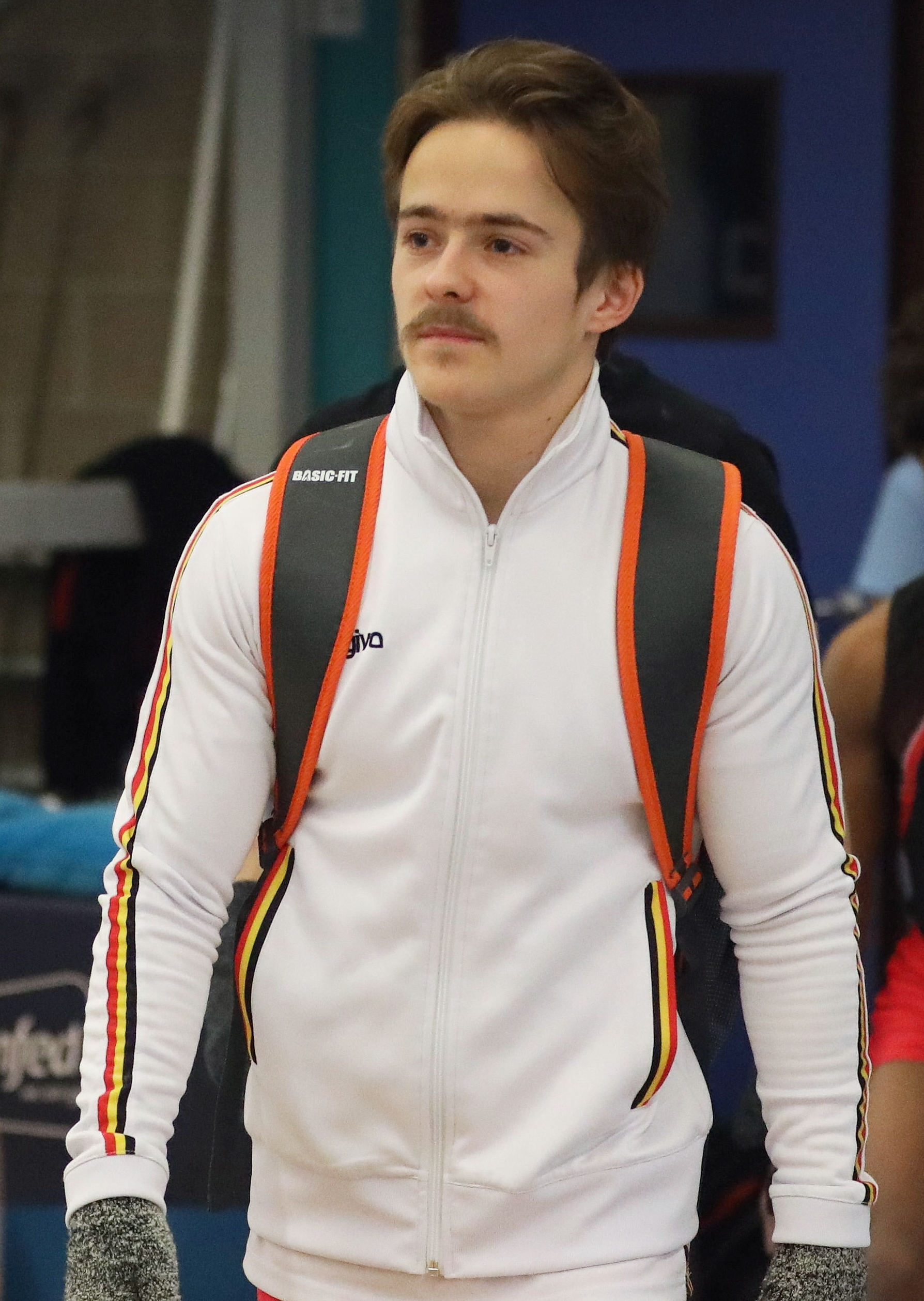
- Cuyle in 2022

Personal information
- Born: 25 July 2002 (age 24) Izegem, Belgium

Gymnastics career
- Discipline: Men's artistic gymnastics
- Country represented: Belgium
- Club: Gym Izegem

Glen Cuyle (born 25 July 2002) is a Belgian artistic gymnast. He represented Belgium at the 2024 Summer Olympics and qualified for the rings final, finishing eighth.

== Early life and education ==
Cuyle was born on 25 July 2002 in Izegem. He has a twin brother, Nicola, who is also an elite gymnast. Nicola and Glen began gymnastics together when they were seven years old. As of 2024, he studies physical education at Ghent University.

== Gymnastics career ==
Cuyle competed at the 2019 Junior World Championships with his brother Nicola and Victor Martinez, and they placed 15th in the team competition, and he did not qualify for any individual finals.

At the 2022 European Championships, Cuyle and the Belgian team placed 12th in the qualification round. At the 2023 Cottbus World Cup, Cuyle qualified for a World Cup final for the first time and finished seventh on the parallel bars. He then placed sixth on the still rings at the Cairo World Cup. Cuyle competed at the 2023 World Championships alongside his brother Nicola, Maxime Gentges, Noah Kuavita, and Luka van den Keybus, and the team placed 15th.

Cuyle won a silver medal on the still rings behind China's Lan Xingyu at the 2024 DTB Pokal Stuttgart. He then competed at the 2024 European Championships where the Belgian team finished 14th in the qualification round, and he also missed the still rings final. He was selected to compete at the 2024 Summer Olympics through the non-nominative spot Belgium earned at the 2023 World Championships.

At the 2024 Olympic Games, Cuyle qualified for the rings final in fourth place. In the final, he fell on his dismount, causing him to finish in eighth place.
