= Mukhammadzhon Iakubov =

Russian artistic gymnast (born 2003)

- Мухаммаджон Якубов
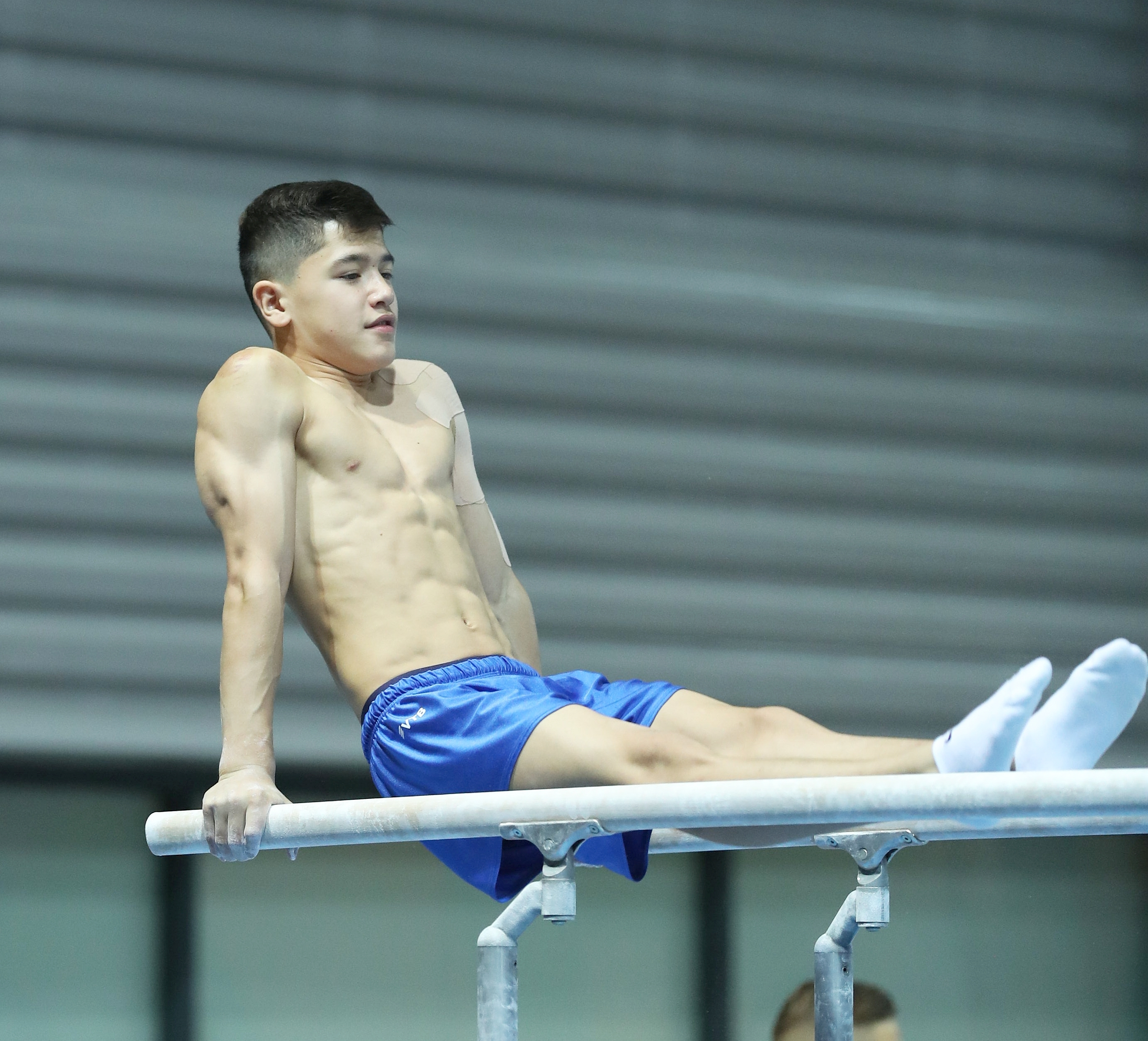
- Iakubov in 2019

Personal information
- Full name: Mukhammadzhon Farrukhovich Iakubov
- Alternative name: Mukhammadzhon Yakubov
- Nicknames: Muhammed, Mukha
- Born: 17 April 2003 (age 23) Tajikistan

Gymnastics career
- Discipline: Men's artistic gymnastics
- Country represented: Russia
- Club: Korolev Sports School of Olympic Reserve
- Head coaches: Leonid Morozov, Sergey Gasilin
Medal record
Representing Russia & (Individual Neutral Athletes) AIN
World Championships
Silver medal – second place	2026 Rotterdam	Team
European Championships
Silver medal – second place	2026 Zagreb	Team

Mukhammadzhon Farrukhovich Iakubov (alt. sp.: Muhammadjon Yakubov; Russian: Мухаммаджон Фаррухович Якубов; born 17 April 2003) is a Russian artistic gymnast. He competed at the 2021 and 2025 World Championships. He is the 2025 Russian national champion on the vault.

== Gymnastics career ==
Iakubov began gymnastics when he was six years old.

Iakubov competed alongside Kirill Gashkov and Ivan Kuliak at the 2019 European Youth Olympic Festival, and they won the team silver medal behind Ukraine. Individually, he won the all-around bronze medal, behind Illia Kovtun and Kuliak. He then won a gold medal in the still rings final.

At the 2021 Russian Championships, Iakubov won a silver medal on the vault, behind Artur Dalaloyan. He was not selected to compete at the 2020 Summer Olympics. He did compete at the 2021 World Championships despite an ankle injury after replacing an injured Dmitri Lankin. There, he finished 11th in the vault qualifications, making him the third reserve for the final.

At the 2023 Russian Cup, Iakubov became the second gymnast to compete a triple back somersault in a piked position on the floor exercise, a skill that is named after Nikita Nagornyy. There, he won a bronze medal in the vault final and placed ninth in the floor exercise final. He won a vault silver medal at the 2024 Voronin Cup and a bronze medal on the floor exercise.

Iakubov won the all-around title at the 2025 Russian Cup, where he also won the floor exercise title and the vault silver medal. He then won a gold medal on the vault, a silver medal on the floor exercise, and a bronze medal on the parallel bars at the 2025 Russian Championships. He was approved by the International Gymnastics Federation for Authorised Neutral Athlete status in August 2025. He returned to international competition at the 2025 World Championships and qualified for the vault final in eighth place. He went on to place sixth in the vault final.

He represented Russia at the 2026 European Artistic Gymnastic Championships in Croatia, winning the team silver.

He was an alternate for the Russian team at the 2026 World Artistic Gymnastics Championships, winning silver in the team event.

== Competitive history ==
Year	Event	Team	AA	FX	PH	SR	VT	PB	HB
2026	European Championships	2nd place, silver medalist(s)							
2026	World Championships	(silver) (Note: Iakubov was the team alternate)							
