= Alena Glotova =

Russian artistic gymnast

- Алёна Глотова
- Born: August 12, 2005 (age 21)

Gymnastics career
- Discipline: Women's artistic gymnastics
- Country represented: Russia
Medal record
Representing Russia & (Individual Neutral Athletes) AIN
European Championships
Gold medal – first place	2026 Zagreb	Team

Alena Aleksandrovna Glotova (Russian: Алёна Александровна Глотова, alt. sp.: Alyona Glotova; born 12 August 2005) is a Russian artistic gymnast. She was part of the gold medal–winning team at the 2026 European Championships.

== Gymnastics career ==
Glotova competed at the 2026 European Championships where she helped Russia (competing as World Gymnastics 2) win team gold; individually she placed sixth on the uneven bars.

In October, Glotova was named to the Russian team (once again competing as World Gymnastics 2) for the 2026 World Championships, alongside Anna Kalmykova, Viktoria Listunova, Angelina Melnikova, and Liudmila Roshchina. Five days before the start of the competition, Glotova was the only women's team member to receive a visa, allowing her to enter the Netherlands. The following day Melnikova, Listunova, and Kalmykova's visas were denied but Roshchina, Elizaveta Us, and Milana Kaiumova's visas were accepted.

== Competitive history ==
Competitive history of Alena Glotova
Year	Event	Team	AA	VT	UB	BB	FX
2022	Russian Championships	1st place, gold medalist(s)	7	6		6	3rd place, bronze medalist(s)
2022	Russian Cup		7	8		5	4
2022	Spartakiade	11	5		6		8
2022	Voronin Cup					2nd place, silver medalist(s)	
2023	Russian Championships		7			3rd place, bronze medalist(s)	
2023	Belarus Open Cup	1st place, gold medalist(s)	3rd place, bronze medalist(s)		4		3rd place, bronze medalist(s)
2023	Russian Cup		7		8	9	
2024	Russian Championships					8	
2024	Russian Cup		2nd place, silver medalist(s)	6	4	2nd place, silver medalist(s)	5
2024	Belarus Open	1st place, gold medalist(s)	4	1st place, gold medalist(s)			
2024	Voronin Cup	2nd place, silver medalist(s)					
2026	Russian Cup	7	4		5		4
2026	Russian Championships	6	3rd place, bronze medalist(s)				
2026	European Championships	1st place, gold medalist(s)					
2026	Spartakiade	5	1st place, gold medalist(s)		2nd place, silver medalist(s)	5	7
2026	World Championships	6	19		6		
