= Savelii Sieedin =

Russian artistic gymnast

- Born: October 17, 2006 (age 20)

Gymnastics career
- Discipline: Men's artistic gymnastics
- Country represented: Russia
Medal record
Representing Russia & (Individual Neutral Athletes) AIN
World Championships
Silver medal – second place	2026 Rotterdam	Team
European Championships
Silver medal – second place	2026 Zagreb	Team
Bronze medal – third place	2026 Zagreb	Horizontal bar

Savelii Sieedin (alt. sp.: Saveli Siedin, Savely Siedin, Saveliy Syedin; Russian: Савелий Олегович Съедин; born 17 October 2006) is a Russian artistic gymnast.

== Career ==
=== 2024 ===
At the 2024 Russian Artistic Gymnastics Championships, he won silver in the team event and bronze on horizontal bar.

=== 2026 ===
In July 2006 at the Russian Artistic Gymnastics Championships, he won two silver medals: one in the team event as part of the Vladimir Region team and one in the all-around.

At the 2026 European Championships, he won two medals: silver in the team event and bronze on horizontal bar.

He is part of the Russian ("World Gymnastics 2") team at the 2026 World Championships and won silver in the team event.

== Competitive history ==
Year	Event	Team	AA	FX	PH	SR	VT	PB	HB
2026	World Championships	2nd place, silver medalist(s)							
