= Lea Marie Quaas =

German artistic gymnast (born 2005)

- Quaas at the 2019 Junior World Championships

Personal information
- Born: July 22, 2005 (age 21) Werdau, Germany

Gymnastics career
- Country represented: Germany
- Club: TuS Chemnitz-Altendorf
- Head coaches: Anatol Ashurkov; Tatjana Bachmayer
Medal record
Representing Germany
Women's artistic gymnastics
European Championships
Silver medal – second place	2025 Leipzig	Team

Lea Marie Quaas (born July 22, 2005) is a German artistic gymnast. She was part of the silver medal-winning team at the 2025 European Championships. She represented Germany at the 2019 Junior World Championships, as well as the 2022, 2023, and 2026 World Championships.

== Junior career ==
=== 2019-2020 ===
Quaas' first international competition was the 2019 International Gymnix in Montreal. The German team placed sixth, and individually, Quaas placed 17th in the all-around and eighth on uneven bars.

At the German Championships in May, Quaas won silver in the all-around as well as on uneven bars and balance beam as part of the Junior 2005 category.

With Emma Malewski and Jasmin Haas, Quaas was named to the German team for the 2019 Junior World Championships. Germany placed eighth as a team. Quaas finished 24th in the all-around and 13th on balance beam.

The following month, Quaas competed at the European Youth Olympic Festival. She contributed scores on vault and balance beam toward Germany's eighth-place finish.

Quaas' final competition at the junior level was the 2020 German Junior Championships. She won the national title on floor exercise in the 2005 division, as well as silver in the all-around, silver on vault, and bronze on uneven bars.

Vault

Uneven Bars

Balance Beam

Floor Exercise

Quaas at the 2019 Junior World Championships

== Senior career ==
=== 2022 ===
At the 2022 Cottbus World Cup, Quaas made her international senior debut, competing on uneven bars, balance beam, and floor exercise. She qualified for the uneven bars final, placing fifth. The following month, Quaas was part of the silver-winning German team at the 2022 DTB Pokal Mixed Cup with Sarah Voss, Aiyu Zhu, Dario Sissakis, Glenn Trebing, and Carlo Hörr. She also competed at the Baku World Cup, once again qualifying for the uneven bars final and finishing eighth.

Quaas competed at her first senior German Championships in June, placing seventh in the all-around and sixth on uneven bars.

In October, Quaas was selected for the German team at the 2022 World Championships in Liverpool. Germany finished 12th as a team, and individually, her best result was 70th on balance beam.

=== 2023 ===
Quaas began the 2023 season at the Doha World Cup, where she competed on balance beam and floor, though she did not make the final in either event. That same month, she placed seventh with the Germany 1 team at the DTB Pokal Team Challenge.

In April, Quaas competed at the European Championships. The German team finished ninth.

At the 2023 German Championships, Quaas became the National Floor Exercise Champion. She also placed fourth in the all-around, just 0.100 out of bronze-medal position. Quaas made her second World Championship team in 2023, competing on balance beam and floor exercise and placing 47th on each. Germany finished 13th during the qualification round.

=== 2024 ===
In May of 2024, Quaas performed routines on balance beam and floor at the Varna Challenge Cup. She qualified for the floor final, finishing sixth.

Quaas once again finished fourth in the all-around at the 2024 German Championships, in addition to placing fourth on beam and floor. She also competed at the German trials for the Paris Olympics, where she won the bronze medal in the all-around beyond Helen Kevric and Karina Schönmaier. However, she was ultimately not selected for the team, with Kevric receiving the lone provisional spot and Schönmaier and Elisabeth Seitz serving as alternates.

Along with Lukas Dauser, Quaas competed for Germany at the 2024 Swiss Cup. The pair placed seventh.

=== 2025 ===
Quaas competed at the 2025 City of Jesolo Trophy, contributing to Germany's eighth-place finish and qualifying for the uneven bars final, placing eighth.

In May, alongside Helen Kevric, Karina Schönmaier, Janoah Müller, and Silja Stöhr, Quaas won team silver for Germany at the European Championships, behind Italy and ahead of France. Individually, she placed 11th on balance beam, making her third reserve for the final.

=== 2026 ===
At the 2026 Cottbus World Cup, Quaas performed on uneven bars and balance beam, making finals and finishing fifth in both events.

Quaas placed tenth in the all-around at the International Gymnix, in addition to finishing fourth on uneven bars and fifth on balance beam. The German team achieved a fourth-place finish. Germany won the gold medal at the DTB Pokal Mixed Cup, with Quaas contributing routines on uneven bars and balance beam. She received the highest score of the competition on the former.

In July, Quaas finished fourth in the all-around at the 2026 German Championships. She also won bronze on uneven bars. She next competed at the European Championships, where she placed 13th in the all-around, Germany's top all-around finish. Germany also qualified for the team final, placing fifth.

Quaas won all-around gold at the German World Championship team qualifying competition. On October 5, she was officially named to the team for the 2026 World Championships, along with Karina Schönmaier, Helen Kevric, Emma Malewski, and Madita Mayr. They finished tenth as a team. Quaas was also first reserve for the all-around final.

== Competitive history ==
Competitive history of Lea Marie Quaas at the junior level
Year	Event	Team	AA	VT	UB	BB	FX
2019	International Gymnix	6	17		8		
2019	German Championships		2nd place, silver medalist(s)		2nd place, silver medalist(s)	2nd place, silver medalist(s)	
2019	FIT Challenge	6	23				
2019	Junior World Championships	8	24		28	13	74
2019	European Youth Olympic Festival	8					
2020	German Championships		2nd place, silver medalist(s)	2nd place, silver medalist(s)	3rd place, bronze medalist(s)		1st place, gold medalist(s)

Competitive history of Lea Marie Quaas at the senior level
Year	Event	Team	AA	VT	UB	BB	FX
2022
2022	Cottbus World Cup				5		
2022	DTB Pokal Mixed Cup	2nd place, silver medalist(s)					
2022	Baku World Cup	7	15				
2022	German Championships		7				
2022	World Championships	12				70	80
2023	Doha World Cup					3rd place, bronze medalist(s)	
2023	DTB Pokal Team Challenge	7					
2023	European Championships	9					
2023	German Championships		4				1st place, gold medalist(s)
2023	World Championships	13				47	47
2024	Varna World Challenge Cup						6
2024	German Championships		4				
2024	German Olympic Trials		3rd place, bronze medalist(s)				
2024	Swiss Cup	7					
2025	City of Jesolo Trophy	8			8		
2025	European Championships	2nd place, silver medalist(s)				R3	
2026
2026	Cottbus World Cup				5	5	
2026	International Gymnix		10		4	5	
2026	DTB Pokal Mixed Cup	1st place, gold medalist(s)					
2026	German Championships		4		3rd place, bronze medalist(s)		
2026	European Championships	5	13				
2026	German World Championship Trials		1st place, gold medalist(s)				
2026	World Championships	10	R1				
