= Clarissa Rinaldi =

Italian artistic gymnast (born 2012)

- Born: 5 June 2012 (age 14)

Gymnastics career
- Discipline: Women's artistic gymnastics
- Country represented: Italy
- Club: Vertigo Roma
- Head coach: Maria Teresa Gargano
Medal record
Representing Italy
Junior European Championships
Silver medal – second place	2026 Zagreb	Team
Bronze medal – third place	2026 Zagreb	All-around
Bronze medal – third place	2026 Zagreb	Uneven bars
Bronze medal – third place	2026 Zagreb	Floor exercise

Clarissa Rinaldi (born 5 June 2012) is an Italian artistic gymnast. She represented Italy at the 2026 Youth Olympics Games.

== Gymnastics career ==
Rinaldi made her international debut at the 2025 Mediterranean Championships, in the espoir division. While there she won gold in the all-around and on vault, uneven bars, and floor exercise. Additionally she helped Italy win team gold.

Rinaldi competed at the 2026 Junior European Championships where she helped Italy win silver behind Russia. Individually she won bronze in the all-around behind Aleksandra Andrianova and Polina Dmitrieva. During event finals she won two more bronze medals, on the uneven bars and on floor exercise, once again behind Dmitrieva and Andriavona on both. Rinaldi was selected to represent Italy at the 2026 Youth Olympics Games alongside Dalila D'Aniello and Sofia Frenna. Together they finished fourth as a team. Individually Rinaldi also finished fourth in the all-around. Additionally she qualified to the inaugural Youth Olympic mixed team final alongside Giacomo Caputto. Together they finished fourth.

== Competitive history ==
Competitive history of Clarissa Rinaldi at the junior level
Year	Event	Team	AA	VT	UB	BB	FX
2025	Mediterranean Championships	1st place, gold medalist(s)	1st place, gold medalist(s)	1st place, gold medalist(s)	1st place, gold medalist(s)	5	1st place, gold medalist(s)
2026	International Gymnix	3rd place, bronze medalist(s)	8	6			3rd place, bronze medalist(s)
2026	City of Jesolo Trophy	3rd place, bronze medalist(s)	5				5
2026	Italian Championships		4				
2026	European Championships	2nd place, silver medalist(s)	3rd place, bronze medalist(s)	5	3rd place, bronze medalist(s)	5	3rd place, bronze medalist(s)
2026	Youth Olympic Games	4	4				
