= 2026 European Women's Artistic Gymnastics Championships =

- Venue: Arena Zagreb
- Location: Zagreb, Croatia
- Start date: 13 August 2026
- End date: 16 August 2026

The 36th European Women's Artistic Gymnastics Championships was held in Arena Zagreb in Zagreb, Croatia, from 13 to 16 August 2026. The organizer was the Croatian Gymnastics Federation, supported by the Government of Croatia and City of Zagreb. This was the first time that Croatia has hosted the European Championships in artistic gymnastics.

Lorette Charpy of France was awarded the SmartScoring Shooting Star Award.

== Schedule ==
Date	Session	Time	Subdivisions
Thursday, 13 August
Thursday, 13 August	Senior All-Around Final and Qualification for Team & Individual Apparatus Finals	09:30 – 10:35	Subdivision 1
Thursday, 13 August	Senior All-Around Final and Qualification for Team & Individual Apparatus Finals	11:00 – 13:05	Subdivision 2
Thursday, 13 August	Senior All-Around Final and Qualification for Team & Individual Apparatus Finals	13:30 – 15:35	Subdivision 3
Thursday, 13 August	Senior All-Around Final and Qualification for Team & Individual Apparatus Finals	16:30 – 18:35	Subdivision 4
Thursday, 13 August	Senior All-Around Final and Qualification for Team & Individual Apparatus Finals	19:00 – 21:05	Subdivision 5
Friday, 14 August	Junior Team & All-Around Finals and Qualification for Individual Apparatus Finals	10:00 – 12:05	Subdivision 1
Friday, 14 August	Junior Team & All-Around Finals and Qualification for Individual Apparatus Finals	12:30 – 14:35	Subdivision 2
Friday, 14 August	Junior Team & All-Around Finals and Qualification for Individual Apparatus Finals	15:30 – 17:35	Subdivision 3
Friday, 14 August	Junior Team & All-Around Finals and Qualification for Individual Apparatus Finals	18:00 – 20:30	Subdivision 4
Saturday, 15 August	Senior Individual Apparatus Finals	14:00 – 18:20	Vault, Uneven bars, Balance beam, Floor
Sunday, 16 August	Junior Individual Apparatus Finals	09:30 – 13:20	Vault, Uneven bars, Balance beam, Floor
Sunday, 16 August	Senior Team Final	15:30 – 18:20	Top 8 from qualifications
All times listed in local time (UTC+01:00).

== Medals summary ==
=== Medalists ===
Event	Gold	Silver	Bronze
Senior
Team	World Gymnastics 2 Alyona Glotova; Anna Kalmykova; Angelina Melnikova; Liudmila Roshchina; Elizaveta Us	Italy; Manila Esposito; Elisa Iorio; July Marano; Giulia Perotti; Anthea Sisio	France; Lorette Charpy; Lola Chassat; Elena Colas; Morgane Osyssek; Maïana Prat
All-around	Angelina Melnikova	Anna Kalmykova	(France) Elena Colas
Vault	Angelina Melnikova	(Germany) Karina Schönmaier	(Belgium) Lisa Vaelen
Uneven bars	(Germany) Helen Kevric	(Italy) Elisa Iorio	(Italy) Giulia Perotti
Balance beam	(France) Elena Colas	(Italy) Manila Esposito	Angelina Melnikova
Floor	(Italy) Manila Esposito	(France) Elena Colas	Angelina Melnikova
Junior
Team	World Gymnastics 2 Aleksandra Andrianova; Polina Dmitrieva; Daria Mironova; Viktoria Tonkonogova; Alina Yarina	Italy; Martina Bozzola; Dalila D'Aniello; Giada Di Pietro; Siria Forestiero; Clarissa Rinaldi	France; Caly Chayani; Chloe Jurado; Lilou Marliac; Manon Milan; Louane Plisson
All-around	Aleksandra Andrianova	Polina Dmitrieva	(Italy) Clarissa Rinaldi
Vault	(Romania) Aniela Tudor	Daria Mironova	(France) Lilou Marliac
Uneven bars	Polina Dmitrieva	Aleksandra Andrianova	(Italy) Clarissa Rinaldi
Balance beam	Polina Dmitrieva	(France) Louane Plisson	(United Kingdom) Elisabetta Cardelli
Floor	Polina Dmitrieva	Aleksandra Andrianova	(Italy) Clarissa Rinaldi

=== Medal standings ===
==== Overall ====
* Host nation (Croatia)

Rank	Nation	Gold	Silver	Bronze	Total
1	World Gymnastics 2 (Note: Russian athletes were not allowed to use their flag or national emblems. They competed as "World Gymnastics 2".)	8	5	2	15
2	Italy	1	4	4	9
3	France	1	2	4	7
4	Germany	1	1	0	2
5	Romania	1	0	0	1
6	Belgium	0	0	1	1
6	Great Britain	0	0	1	1
Totals (7 entries)		12	12	12	36

==== Senior ====
* Host nation (Croatia)

Rank	Nation	Gold	Silver	Bronze	Total
1	World Gymnastics 2	3	1	2	6
2	Italy	1	3	1	5
3	France	1	1	2	4
4	Germany	1	1	0	2
5	Belgium	0	0	1	1
Totals (5 entries)		6	6	6	18

==== Junior ====
* Host nation (Croatia)

Rank	Nation	Gold	Silver	Bronze	Total
1	World Gymnastics 2	5	4	0	9
2	Romania	1	0	0	1
3	Italy	0	1	3	4
4	France	0	1	2	3
5	Great Britain	0	0	1	1
Totals (5 entries)		6	6	6	18

== Senior results ==
=== Team competition ===
Rank	Team	Vault (gymnastics)	Uneven bars	Balance beam	Floor (gymnastics)	Total
1st place, gold medalist(s)	World Gymnastics 2	42.166	42.366	40.899	39.999	165.430
1st place, gold medalist(s)	Alena Glotova					165.430
1st place, gold medalist(s)	Angelina Melnikova	14.066	14.000	13.766	13.333	165.430
1st place, gold medalist(s)	Anna Kalmykova	14.100	14.366	13.500	13.466	165.430
1st place, gold medalist(s)	Liudmila Roshchina	14.000	14.000	13.633	13.200	165.430
1st place, gold medalist(s)	Elizaveta Us					165.430
2nd place, silver medalist(s)	Italy	40.132	41.799	40.366	39.499	161.796
2nd place, silver medalist(s)	Elisa Iorio	13.066	14.333			161.796
2nd place, silver medalist(s)	Manila Esposito			14.200	13.533	161.796
2nd place, silver medalist(s)	July Marano			12.766	13.166	161.796
2nd place, silver medalist(s)	Giulia Perotti	13.166	14.166	13.400	12.800	161.796
2nd place, silver medalist(s)	Anthea Sisio	13.900	13.300			161.796
3rd place, bronze medalist(s)	France	40.100	40.632	38.632	39.899	159.263
3rd place, bronze medalist(s)	Morgane Osyssek-Reimer	13.000		13.166	13.200	159.263
3rd place, bronze medalist(s)	Elena Colas	13.800	14.600	13.866	13.366	159.263
3rd place, bronze medalist(s)	Maïana Prat			11.600	13.333	159.263
3rd place, bronze medalist(s)	Lorette Charpy	13.300	12.666			159.263
3rd place, bronze medalist(s)	Lola Chassat		13.366			159.263
4	Great Britain	41.166	38.999	39.499	38.100	157.764
4	Ruby Evans	14.100	11.966	12.633	13.300	157.764
4	Abigail Martin	13.666	13.600		13.200	157.764
4	Ruby Stacey	13.400	13.433	12.700		157.764
4	Alia Leat			14.166	11.600	157.764
4	Becky Downie					157.764
5	Germany	39.999	40.766	38.100	37.799	156.664
5	Helen Kevric		14.700	12.700		156.664
5	Pauline Schaefer-Betz	12.800		13.600		156.664
5	Karina Schönmaier	13.733	13.000		12.766	156.664
5	Silja Stoehr				12.833	156.664
5	Lea Marie Quaas	13.466	13.066	11.800	12.200	156.664
6	Netherlands	38.265	40.265	37.799	36.666	152.995
6	Sanna Veerman	12.166	14.266			152.995
6	Sanne Wevers					152.995
6	Naomi Visser		14.433	13.133	11.966	152.995
6	Floor Slooff	13.066		11.566	12.200	152.995
6	Vera Ubbink	13.033	11.566	13.100	12.500	152.995
7	Spain	39.266	34.499	38.066	38.299	150.130
7	Carlota Armenta					150.130
7	Marina Escudero	13.700	8.633		12.600	150.130
7	Laia Font	13.500	12.733	12.033	12.766	150.130
7	Alba Petisco	12.066	13.133	13.600	12.933	150.130
7	Aitana Pacheco			12.433		150.130
8	Belgium	37.799	37.533	37.465	35.032	147.829
8	Lisa Vaelen	13.833	13.433	12.866	12.900	147.829
8	Jade Vansteenkiste					147.829
8	Lena Devreker	11.466	11.700	11.633	10.966	147.829
8	Naomi Descamps		12.400	12.966		147.829
8	Mie De Wilde	12.500			11.166	147.829

=== All-around ===
The qualification round served as the all-around competition, with no designated all-around final. Listed below are the results of the top 24 competitors, ranking two gymnasts per country.

Rank	Gymnast	Vault (gymnastics)	Uneven bars	Balance beam	Floor (gymnastics)	Total
1st place, gold medalist(s)	Angelina Melnikova	14.033	14.266	13.833	13.800	55.932
2nd place, silver medalist(s)	Anna Kalmykova	14.100	14.366	13.566	12.600	54.632
3rd place, bronze medalist(s)	(France) Elena Colas	13.600	13.800	13.300	13.266	53.966
4	(Netherlands) Naomi Visser	13.000	14.266	13.033	13.000	53.299
5	(Spain) Alba Petisco	13.400	13.566	13.066	13.166	53.198
6	(Italy) July Marano	13.300	14.000	12.733	13.000	53.033
7	(United Kingdom) Abigail Martin	13.800	13.666	12.066	13.500	53.032
8	(United Kingdom) Ruby Evans	13.900	13.200	12.666	13.066	52.832
9	(Italy) Giulia Perotti	13.033	14.133	12.433	12.566	52.165
10	(Switzerland) Lena Bickel	13.366	12.100	13.133	13.133	51.732
11	(Spain) Laia Font	13.633	11.900	13.066	12.966	51.565
12	(Belgium) Lisa Vaelen	14.000	13.300	11.266	12.866	51.432
13	(Germany) Lea Marie Quaas	13.366	13.233	12.533	12.000	51.132
14	(France) Maïana Prat	12.200	12.600	13.166	13.166	51.132
15	(Ukraine) Diana Lobok	12.166	13.333	13.066	12.233	50.798
16	(Germany) Silja Stoehr	12.200	12.900	12.566	12.900	50.566
17	(Netherlands) Vera Ubbink	13.033	11.633	13.066	12.766	50.498
18	(Romania) Alexia Blanaru	13.400	11.566	13.033	12.366	50.365
19	(Ukraine) Kristina Hrudetska	12.733	12.933	12.100	12.200	49.966
20	(Czech Republic) Soňa Artamonova	12.800	12.733	12.300	12.133	49.966
21	(Slovenia) Lucija Hribar	13.066	13.333	11.966	11.233	49.598
22	(Republic of Ireland) Emma Slevin	13.033	12.433	12.766	11.233	49.465
23	(Sweden) Nathalie Westlund	13.100	12.600	12.033	11.666	49.399
24	(Austria) Leni Bohle	13.066	11.833	12.266	12.233	49.398

Only two gymnasts from each country were allowed to be ranked in the all-around. The following gymnasts were impacted by this rule:

- Liudmila Roshchina (53.866)
- (Italy) Anthea Sisio (51.766)
- (Spain) Marina Escudero (51.133)

=== Vault ===
Oldest and youngest competitors

	Name	Country	Date of birth	Age
Youngest	Anna Kalmykova	WG2	22 August 2008	17 years, 11 months and 24 days
Oldest	Angelina Melnikova	WG2	18 July 2000	26 years and 28 days

Rank	Gymnast	Vault 1				Vault 2				Bonus	Total
Rank	Gymnast	D Score	E Score	Pen.	Score 1	D Score	E Score	Pen.	Score 2	Bonus	Total
1st place, gold medalist(s)	Angelina Melnikova	5.0	8.900	-0.1	13.800	5.6	8.533		14.133	0.2	14.166
2nd place, silver medalist(s)	(Germany) Karina Schönmaier	5.0	9.033		14.033	4.8	8.900		13.700	0.2	14.066
3rd place, bronze medalist(s)	(Belgium) Lisa Vaelen	5.4	8.733		14.133	4.4	9.033		13.433	0.2	13.983
4	(United Kingdom) Abigail Martin	5.0	8.933		13.933	4.8	8.666		13.466	0.2	13.899
5	Anna Kalmykova	5.4	8.566		13.966	4.6	8.733		13.333	0.2	13.849
6	(Austria) Charlize Mörz	4.6	8.966		13.566	4.4	8.900		13.300	0.2	13.633
7	(Hungary) Gréta Mayer	4.4	9.000		13.400	4.6	8.700		13.300		13.350
8	(Hungary) Csenge Bácskay	5.0	8.666	-0.3	13.366	4.8	8.633	-0.1	13.333		13.349

=== Uneven bars ===
Oldest and youngest competitors

	Name	Country	Date of birth	Age
Youngest	Sofia Shtykhetskaya	WG1	26 August 2010	15 years, 11 months and 20 days
Oldest	Naomi Visser	Netherlands	24 August 2001	24 years, 11 months and 22 days

Rank	Gymnast	D Score	E Score	Pen.	Total
1st place, gold medalist(s)	(Germany) Helen Kevric	6.2	8.300		14.500
2nd place, silver medalist(s)	(Italy) Elisa Iorio	6.3	8.033		14.333
3rd place, bronze medalist(s)	(Italy) Giulia Perotti	6.1	8.133		14.233
4	(Netherlands) Sanna Veerman	6.3	7.900		14.200
5	Anna Kalmykova	6.4	7.700		14.100
6	Alena Glotova	5.5	6.700		12.200
7	Sofia Shtykhetskaya	5.9	5.800		11.700
8	(Netherlands) Naomi Visser	5.2	6.066		11.266

=== Balance beam ===
Oldest and youngest competitors

	Name	Country	Date of birth	Age
Youngest	Elena Colas	France	1 May 2010	16 years, 3 months and 14 days
Oldest	Pauline Schäfer-Betz	Germany	4 January 1997	29 years, 7 months and 11 days

Rank	Gymnast	D Score	E Score	Pen.	Total
1st place, gold medalist(s)	(France) Elena Colas	5.8	8.133		13.933
2nd place, silver medalist(s)	(Italy) Manila Esposito	5.8	8.033		13.833
3rd place, bronze medalist(s)	Angelina Melnikova	5.6	8.100		13.700
4	(Germany) Pauline Schaefer-Betz	5.6	8.133	-0.1	13.633
5	(United Kingdom) Alia Leat	6.2	7.233		13.433
6	(Spain) Aitana Pacheco	5.6	7.700		13.300
7	Anna Kalmykova	5.4	7.533		12.933
8	(France) Morgane Osyssek-Reimer	5.9	6.633		12.533

=== Floor exercise ===
Oldest and youngest competitors

	Name	Country	Date of birth	Age
Youngest	Elena Colas	France	1 May 2010	16 years, 3 months and 14 days
Oldest	Angelina Melnikova	WG2	18 July 2000	26 years and 28 days

Rank	Gymnast	D Score	E Score	Pen.	Total
1st place, gold medalist(s)	(Italy) Manila Esposito	5.8	8.000	-0.1	13.700
2nd place, silver medalist(s)	(France) Elena Colas	5.5	8.133		13.633
3rd place, bronze medalist(s)	Angelina Melnikova	5.9	7.666		13.566
4	(United Kingdom) Ruby Evans	5.4	8.066		13.466
5	(Spain) Alba Petisco	5.6	7.866		13.466
6	(France) Maïana Prat	5.5	7.833		13.333
7	(United Kingdom) Abigail Martin	5.7	7.566	-0.2	13.066
8	(Switzerland) Lena Bickel	5.2	7.833		13.033

== Junior results ==
=== Team competition ===
The team results were determined by the results of the qualification round, with no designated team final. Below are the results of the top 8 teams.

Rank	Team	Vault (gymnastics)	Uneven bars	Balance beam	Floor (gymnastics)	Total
1st place, gold medalist(s)	World Gymnastics 2	39.599	40.966	39.532	38.532	158.629
1st place, gold medalist(s)	Aleksandra Andrianova	13.066	13.966	13.400	13.133	158.629
1st place, gold medalist(s)	Polina Dmitrieva	13.233	13.700	13.466	12.766	158.629
1st place, gold medalist(s)	Alina Iarina	13.000	10.233			158.629
1st place, gold medalist(s)	Daria Mironova	13.300		12.066	12.633	158.629
1st place, gold medalist(s)	Viktoriia Tonkonogova		13.300	12.666	12.533	158.629
2nd place, silver medalist(s)	Italy	38.965	39.499	38.166	37.132	153.762
2nd place, silver medalist(s)	Martina Bozzola	12.866	12.266	12.400	12.600	153.762
2nd place, silver medalist(s)	Giada Di Pietro	12.366	13.633	10.766	11.633	153.762
2nd place, silver medalist(s)	Siria Forestiero	12.933	11.400	12.400	11.966	153.762
2nd place, silver medalist(s)	Clarissa Rinaldi	13.166	13.600	13.366	12.566	153.762
3rd place, bronze medalist(s)	France	39.232	39.599	37.566	36.732	153.129
3rd place, bronze medalist(s)	Caly Chayani	13.000	12.466	12.133	12.233	153.129
3rd place, bronze medalist(s)	Chloe Jurado	12.366	12.800	12.233	12.166	153.129
3rd place, bronze medalist(s)	Lilou Marliac	13.166	13.066		12.333	153.129
3rd place, bronze medalist(s)	Manon Milan	13.066		11.266	11.333	153.129
3rd place, bronze medalist(s)	Louane Plisson		13.733	13.200		153.129
4	(United Kingdom) Great Britain	38.566	38.299	35.332	36.732	148.462
4	Evie Ashurst	12.800	12.533	11.233	11.300	148.462
4	Elisabetta Cardelli			12.600	12.266	148.462
4	Helena Finc	12.866	13.300	11.366	12.066	148.462
4	Jenitha Johnson	12.733	12.466	11.366	11.933	148.462
4	Aurelia Pellowe	12.900	11.333			148.462
5	Belgium	37.399	37.899	36.299	35.966	147.563
5	Zeila Caufriez	12.533	12.333	12.033	11.566	147.563
5	Camille Galand			12.966	12.200	147.563
5	Leana Makasi	11.966	12.266		11.266	147.563
5	Emma Sneessens	11.900	12.866	9.600	12.200	147.563
5	Alyxe Yang	12.900	12.700	11.300		147.563
6	World Gymnastics 1	38.233	37.032	34.166	35.466	144.897
6	Aryna Malochka	12.833	12.233	9.733	11.900	144.897
6	Alena Zhykharava	12.500	13.166	11.733	11.800	144.897
6	Viyaleta Vazniuk	12.900	10.566	9.500	11.166	144.897
6	Milana Tsalabanova	11.600	11.633	12.700	11.766	144.897
7	Germany	37.898	35.833	35.700	34.933	144.364
7	Maha Feniuk		12.000	12.400	11.200	144.364
7	Mia Frick	11.800	9.600	10.800		144.364
7	Anni Sohnsmeyer	12.366	12.200	11.500	11.400	144.364
7	Luna Zimmermann	12.866	11.633	11.800	12.300	144.364
7	Amelie Schilling	12.666			11.066	144.364
8	Israel	37.833	36.466	34.665	34.932	143.896
8	Ophir Shmuely	12.500	12.733	11.966	11.900	143.896
8	Mika Grimberg	12.633	12.733	11.533	11.566	143.896
8	Lili Tores	12.700	10.766		11.466	143.896
8	Ori Anna Reis			11.166	10.833	143.896
8	Ilil Frenkel	12.400	11.000	10.400		143.896

=== All-around ===
The qualification round served as the all-around competition, with no designated all-around final. Listed below are the results of the top 24 competitors, ranking two gymnasts per country.

Rank	Gymnast	Vault (gymnastics)	Uneven bars	Balance beam	Floor (gymnastics)	Total
1st place, gold medalist(s)	Aleksandra Andrianova	13.066	13.966	13.400	13.133	53.565
2nd place, silver medalist(s)	Polina Dmitrieva	13.233	13.700	13.466	12.766	53.165
3rd place, bronze medalist(s)	(Italy) Clarissa Rinaldi	13.166	13.600	13.366	12.566	52.698
4	(Slovakia) Lucia Piliarová	12.800	13.066	12.366	12.266	50.498
5	(Italy) Martina Bozzola	12.866	12.266	12.400	12.600	50.132
6	(France) Caly Chayani	13.000	12.466	12.133	12.233	49.832
7	(United Kingdom) Helena Finc	12.866	13.300	11.366	12.066	49.598
8	(France) Chloe Jurado	12.366	12.800	12.233	12.166	49.565
9	Alena Zhykhara	12.500	13.166	11.733	11.800	49.199
10	(Israel) Ophir Shmuely	12.500	12.733	11.966	11.900	49.099
11	(Germany) Luna Zimmermann	12.866	11.633	11.800	12.333	48.632
12	(United Kingdom) Jenitha Johnson	12.733	12.466	11.366	11.933	48.498
13	(Belgium) Zeila Caufriez	12.533	12.333	12.033	11.566	48.465
13	(Israel) Mika Grimberg	12.633	12.733	11.533	11.566	48.465
15	(Georgia (country)) Maria Jvania	12.166	12.166	12.400	11.566	48.298
16	(Spain) Victoria Valeros	12.733	12.800	11.000	11.600	48.133
17	Milana Tsalabanova	11.600	11.633	12.700	11.766	47.699
18	(Germany) Anni Sohnsmeyer	12.366	12.200	11.500	11.400	47.466
19	(Slovakia) Lilly Murinova	12.566	12.233	11.200	11.466	47.465
20	(Romania) Aniela Tudor	13.233	9.966	12.366	11.866	47.431
21	(Spain) Claudia Boata	12.833	11.900	11.166	11.366	47.265
22	(Ukraine) Yana Protsenko	12.566	11.400	12.066	11.200	47.232
23	(Romania) Delia Jitea	12.933	9.433	12.400	12.066	46.832
24	(Finland) Nadine Tieva	12.766	9.633	12.233	12.166	46.798

Only two gymnasts from each country were allowed to be ranked in the all-around. The following gymnasts were impacted by this rule:

- (Italy) Siria Forestirio (48.699)
- (Italy) Giada Di Pietro (48.398)
- (United Kingdom) Evie Ashurst (47.866)

=== Vault ===
Rank	Gymnast	Vault 1				Vault 2				Bonus	Total
Rank	Gymnast	D Score	E Score	Pen.	Score 1	D Score	E Score	Pen.	Score 2	Bonus	Total
1st place, gold medalist(s)	(Romania) Aniela Tudor	4.4	8.800		13.200	4.8	8.766		13.566		13.383
2nd place, silver medalist(s)	Daria Mironova	4.2	9.000		13.200	4.0	9.133		13.133		13.166
3rd place, bronze medalist(s)	(France) Lilou Marliac	4.4	9.000		13.400	4.0	8.866		12.866		13.133
4	(Germany) Luna Zimmermann	4.2	9.133		13.333	3.6	9.100		12.700		13.016
5	(Italy) Clarissa Rinaldi	4.2	9.033		13.233	3.6	9.100		12.700		12.966
6	Alina Iarina	4.2	8.866		13.066	4.0	8.833		12.833		12.949
7	(United Kingdom) Jenitha Johnson	4.2	8.833		13.033	4.6	7.633	-0.3	11.933		12.483
8	Aryna Malochka	4.2	8.733		12.933	3.8	7.633		11.433		12.183

=== Uneven bars ===
Rank	Gymnast	D Score	E Score	Pen.	Total
1st place, gold medalist(s)	Polina Dmitrieva	6.0	7.900		13.900
2nd place, silver medalist(s)	Aleksandra Andrianova	5.7	7.966		13.666
3rd place, bronze medalist(s)	(Italy) Clarissa Rinaldi	5.6	7.933		13.533
4	(France) Louane Plisson	5.8	7.600		13.400
5	Alena Zhykharava	5.1	8.000		13.100
6	(France) Lilou Marliac	5.1	7.733		12.833
7	(United Kingdom) Helena Finc	5.3	7.000		12.300
8	(Italy) Giada Di Pietro	5.6	6.633		12.233

=== Balance beam ===
Rank	Gymnast	D Score	E Score	Pen.	Total
1st place, gold medalist(s)	Polina Dmitrieva	5.8	8.133		13.933
2nd place, silver medalist(s)	(France) Louane Plisson	5.1	8.066		13.166
3rd place, bronze medalist(s)	(United Kingdom) Elisabetta Cardelli	5.3	7.533		12.833
4	(Republic of Ireland) Estella Volkoff	5.1	7.333		12.433
5	(Italy) Clarissa Rinaldi	5.4	7.000		12.400
6	Aleksandra Andrianova	5.2	7.100		12.300
7	Milana Tsalabanova	5.0	7.266		12.266
8	(Belgium) Camille Galand	5.4	6.600		12.000

=== Floor exercise ===
Rank	Gymnast	D Score	E Score	Pen.	Total
1st place, gold medalist(s)	Polina Dmitrieva	5.2	8.033		13.233
2nd place, silver medalist(s)	Aleksandra Andrianova	5.2	7.766		12.966
3rd place, bronze medalist(s)	(Italy) Clarissa Rinaldi	4.9	7.733		12.633
4	(Slovakia) Lucia Piliarova	4.5	7.566	-0.1	11.966
5	(United Kingdom) Elisabetta Cardelli	4.8	7.166	-0.1	11.866
6	(Italy) Martina Bozzola	5.1	6.666		11.766
7	(Germany) Luna Zimmermann	4.8	6.900		11.700
8	(France) Lilou Marliac	4.4	6.733		11.133

== Controversies ==
In May 2026, World Gymnastics lifted all restrictions against Russian and Belarusian athletes, allowing them to represent their country instead of competing as Authorised Neutral Athletes. However, at the 2026 Rhythmic Gymnastics World Cup in Cluj-Napoca, organizers refused to display the Russian flag or play the Russian national anthem after Cluj-Napoca mayor, Emil Boc, said they were not allowed. As a result, World Gymnastics announced that any events allocated before the May 2026 announcement, including the 2026 European Championships, the local government could dictate whether or not to use Russian and Belarusian flags and anthems. The Croatian government announced that they would implement all measures related to the ban on the use of national flags, anthems, state symbols and other national symbols of Russia and Belarus during the European Championships.

A week before the start of the competition, the Croatian government denied visas to multiple members of the Russia delegation, including registered athletes Anna Kalmykova, Viktoria Listunova, and Angelina Melnikova. Days later, after the Russian Ministry of Foreign Affairs worked with the Croatian Gymnastics Union as well as European Gymnastics, Melnikova and Kalmykova were granted visas. Listunova's visa was still denied.
