= Emelie Petz =

German artistic gymnast

- Born: 24 March 2003 (age 23) Backnang, Baden-Württemberg, Germany

Gymnastics career
- Discipline: Women's artistic gymnastics
- Country represented: Germany (2016–2023)
- Club: TSG Backnang
- Head coach: Marie-Luise Probst-Hindermann
- Assistant coach: Robert Mai
- Retired: 20 December 2023

Emelie Petz (born 24 March 2003) is a retired German artistic gymnast and is a two-time junior national champion.

== Early life ==
Petz was born in Backnang in 2003. She currently trains in Allmersbach im Tal.

== Junior gymnastics career ==
=== 2015–2016 ===
In 2015 Petz competed at her first German Junior National Championships where she placed first amongst the AK12 division. During event finals she placed first on uneven bars and balance beam, second on floor exercise behind Sidney Hayn and fourth on vault. In 2016 she once again competed at the German Junior National Championships where she placed first amongst the other thirteen year olds. Additionally she placed first on vault, second on uneven bars, third on balance beam, and fifth on floor exercise. In December 2016 she competed at the Voronin Cup where she was partnered with senior national team member Carina Kröll. They finished second behind the Russian pair of Lilia Akhaimova and Elena Eremina. Individually she finished fifth in the all-around, first on vault, fifth on uneven bars, and seventh on balance beam.

=== 2017 ===
In 2017 Petz competed at the German National Team Cup where she placed third in the all-around behind Tabea Alt and Pauline Schäfer. In June she competed at the German National Championships where she first in the all-around; during event finals she also won the gold medal on all four apparatuses. The following month she competed in a friendly meet again Italy, Great Britain, Switzerland, and France. She contributed towards Germany's fifth-place finish and placed eighth in the all-around. Petz was later selected to represent Germany at the 2017 European Youth Olympic Festival alongside Leonie Papke and Kim Ruoff where she contributed towards Germany's bronze place finish behind Russia and Italy. During the all-around final Petz finished in tenth place after falling on both uneven bars and balance beam. In the event finals Petz won the silver medal on floor exercise behind Ksenia Klimenko of Russia and placed fourth on vault, eighth on uneven bars, and sixth on balance beam.

=== 2018 ===
In May Petz competed at the German Junior National Championships where she won the gold medal in the all-around and on all four events. In July Petz competed at a friendly competition in Pieve di Soligo where she helped Germany place fourth and individually she placed tenth in the all-around.

In August Petz was selected to represent Germany at the 2018 European Championships alongside Lisa Zimmermann, Emma Malewski, Lara Hinsberger, and Leonie Papke. Together they finished seventh in the team final. Individually Petz finished fourteenth in the all-around after suffering foot pains. Later in the year Petz decided to forgo competing at the 2018 Youth Olympic Games and instead get surgery on her foot which was causing her pain throughout the year.

== Senior gymnastics career ==
=== 2019 ===
In 2019 Petz turned senior. She made her debut at the DTB Team Challenge where she helped Germany finish fifth as a team. The following month she competed at the European Championships but did not qualify for any event finals.

In August Petz competed at her first German National Championships as a senior elite where she placed fourth in the all-around behind Sarah Voss, Kim Bui, and Sophie Scheder. She placed second on vault behind Voss, third on uneven bars behind Elisabeth Seitz and Scheder, second on balance beam behind Voss, and fourth on floor exercise. As a result, Petz qualified to compete at the World Trials for a chance to make the German team that would compete at the 2019 World Championships. At the World Trials she finished first in the all-around.

In September Petz was named to the team to compete at the 2019 World Championships in Stuttgart alongside Bui, Seitz, Voss, and Scheder (later replaced by Pauline Schäfer). Later that month Petz competed at a friendly competition in Worms, Germany where she helped Germany finish first as a team and individually she finished fourth in the all-around behind Seitz, Aline Friess of France, and Scheder.

At the World Championships Petz competed all four events during qualification and helped Germany place ninth as a team. Although they did not qualify to the team final, they qualified a team to the 2020 Olympic Games in Tokyo. Petz did not qualify for any individual finals.

=== 2021 ===
On 13 June Petz was selected as the alternate for the team to compete at the 2020 Olympic Games.

== Eponymous skill ==
Petz has one eponymous skill listed in the Code of Points.

Apparatus	Name	Description	Difficulty (Note: Valid for the 2025–2028 Code of Points)	Added to the Code of Points
Uneven bars	Petz	Clear straddle circle with salto forward tucked with 1/1 twist (360°)	D (0.4)	2019 World Championships

== Competitive history ==
Year	Event	Team	AA	VT	UB	BB	FX
Junior
2015	National Championships (AK12)		1st place, gold medalist(s)	4	1st place, gold medalist(s)	1st place, gold medalist(s)	2nd place, silver medalist(s)
2016	National Championships (AK13)		1st place, gold medalist(s)	1st place, gold medalist(s)	2nd place, silver medalist(s)	3rd place, bronze medalist(s)	5
2016	Voronin Cup	2nd place, silver medalist(s)	5	1st place, gold medalist(s)	5	7	
2017	National Team Cup		3rd place, bronze medalist(s)				
2017	National Championships		1st place, gold medalist(s)	1st place, gold medalist(s)	1st place, gold medalist(s)	1st place, gold medalist(s)	1st place, gold medalist(s)
2017	Esslingen-Berkheim Friendly	5	8				
2017	Euro Youth Olympic Festival	3rd place, bronze medalist(s)	10	4	8	6	2nd place, silver medalist(s)
2018	National Championships		1st place, gold medalist(s)	1st place, gold medalist(s)	1st place, gold medalist(s)	1st place, gold medalist(s)	1st place, gold medalist(s)
2018	Pieve di Soligo Friendly	4	10				
2018	European Championships	7	14				
Senior
2019	DTB Team Challenge	5					
2019	National Championships		4	2nd place, silver medalist(s)	3rd place, bronze medalist(s)	2nd place, silver medalist(s)	4
2019	German World Trials		1st place, gold medalist(s)				
2019	Worms Friendly	1st place, gold medalist(s)	4				
2019	World Championships	R1					
2021	FIT Challenge	6			8		
2023	German Championships					4	
