= 2024 Swiss Cup Zürich =

Artistic gymnastics competition

- Location: Zürich, Switzerland
- Date: November 9, 2024

Medalists
gold medal	(France) Morgane Osyssek & Léo Saladino
silver medal	(Algeria) Kaylia Nemour & (Switzerland) Christian Baumann
bronze medal	(Germany) Karina Schönmaier & (Italy) Mario Macchiati

The 2024 Swiss Cup Zürich was an artistic gymnastics competition that was held on November 9 in Zürich, Switzerland. It was the 41st iteration of the event. This was the last competition of Christian Baumann.

== Participants ==
Team	WAG	MAG
Austria	Selina Kickinger	Ricardo Rudy
Brazil	Julia Soares	Caio Souza
France	Morgane Osyssek	Léo Saladino
Germany	Lea Quaas	Lukas Dauser
Netherlands	Naomi Visser	Jermain Grünberg
Switzerland 1	Anny Wu	Luca Giubellini
Switzerland 2	Stefanie Siegenthaler	Florian Langenegger
United States	Leanne Wong	Fuzzy Benas
(Algeria) (Switzerland) Ba'mour (Note: Mixed team consisting of Christian Baumann (SUI) and Kaylia Nemour (ALG))	Kaylia Nemour	Christian Baumann
(Germany) (Italy) DeuTalia (Note: Originally Team Italy, Angela Andreoli was injured days before the competition and was replaced with Karina Schönmaier of Germany)	Karina Schönmaier	Mario Macchiati

== Results ==
=== Prelims ===
Rank	Name	Round 1	Round 2	Total
1	(Germany) (Italy) DeuTalia			54.200
1	Karina Schönmaier	13.400	12.800	26.200
1	Mario Macchiati	14.300	13.700	28.000
2	(Algeria) (Switzerland) Ba'mour			53.950
2	Kaylia Nemour	13.650	13.050	26.700
2	Christian Baumann	13.850	13.400	27.250
3	Brazil			53.900
3	Julia Soares	11.600	13.000	24.600
3	Caio Souza	14.900	14.400	29.300
4	France			53.825
4	Morgane Osyssek	12.975	12.500	25.475
4	Léo Saladino	14.250	14.100	28.350
5	Netherlands			53.150
5	Naomi Visser	12.300	13.800	26.100
5	Jermain Grünberg	14.250	12.800	27.050
6	Switzerland 1			51.600
6	Anny Wu	12.300	11.700	24.000
6	Florian Langenegger	13.400	14.200	27.600
7	Germany			51.450
7	Lea Marie Quaas	12.650	12.650	25.300
7	Lukas Dauser	14.950	11.200	26.150
8	Austria			50.425
8	Selina Kickinger	13.025	12.000	25.025
8	Ricardo Rudy	12.250	13.150	25.400
9	United States			24.900
9	Leanne Wong	11.100		11.100
9	Fuzzy Benas	13.800		13.800
10	Switzerland 2			24.750
10	Stefanie Siegenthaler	10.850		10.850
10	Luca Giubellini	13.900		13.900

the team advanced to the semi-finals

=== Semi-finals ===
Rank	Name	Scores	Total
FRA vs DeuTalia
1	France		26.300
1	Morgane Osyssek	11.850	26.300
1	Léo Saladino	14.450	26.300
2	(Germany) (Italy) DeuTalia		26.000
2	Karina Schönmaier	12.050	26.000
2	Mario Macchiati	13.950	26.000
Ba'mour vs BRA
1	(Algeria) (Switzerland) Ba'mour		26.350
1	Kaylia Nemour	12.750	26.350
1	Christian Baumann	13.600	26.350
2	Brazil		24.550
2	Julia Soares	10.450	24.550
2	Caio Souza	14.100	24.550

the team advanced to the finals

=== Finals ===
Rank	Name	Scores	Total
Championships
1st place, gold medalist(s)	France		27.550
1st place, gold medalist(s)	Morgane Osyssek	13.050	27.550
1st place, gold medalist(s)	Léo Saladino	14.500	27.550
2nd place, silver medalist(s)	(Algeria) (Switzerland) Ba'mour		26.200
2nd place, silver medalist(s)	Kaylia Nemour	12.300	26.200
2nd place, silver medalist(s)	Christian Baumann	13.900	26.200
Third place
3rd place, bronze medalist(s)	(Germany) (Italy) DeuTalia		28.475
3rd place, bronze medalist(s)	Karina Schönmaier	13.475	28.475
3rd place, bronze medalist(s)	Mario Macchiati	15.000	28.475
4	Brazil		27.500
4	Julia Soares	12.700	27.500
4	Caio Souza	14.800	27.500
