= Karina Schönmaier =

German artistic gymnast

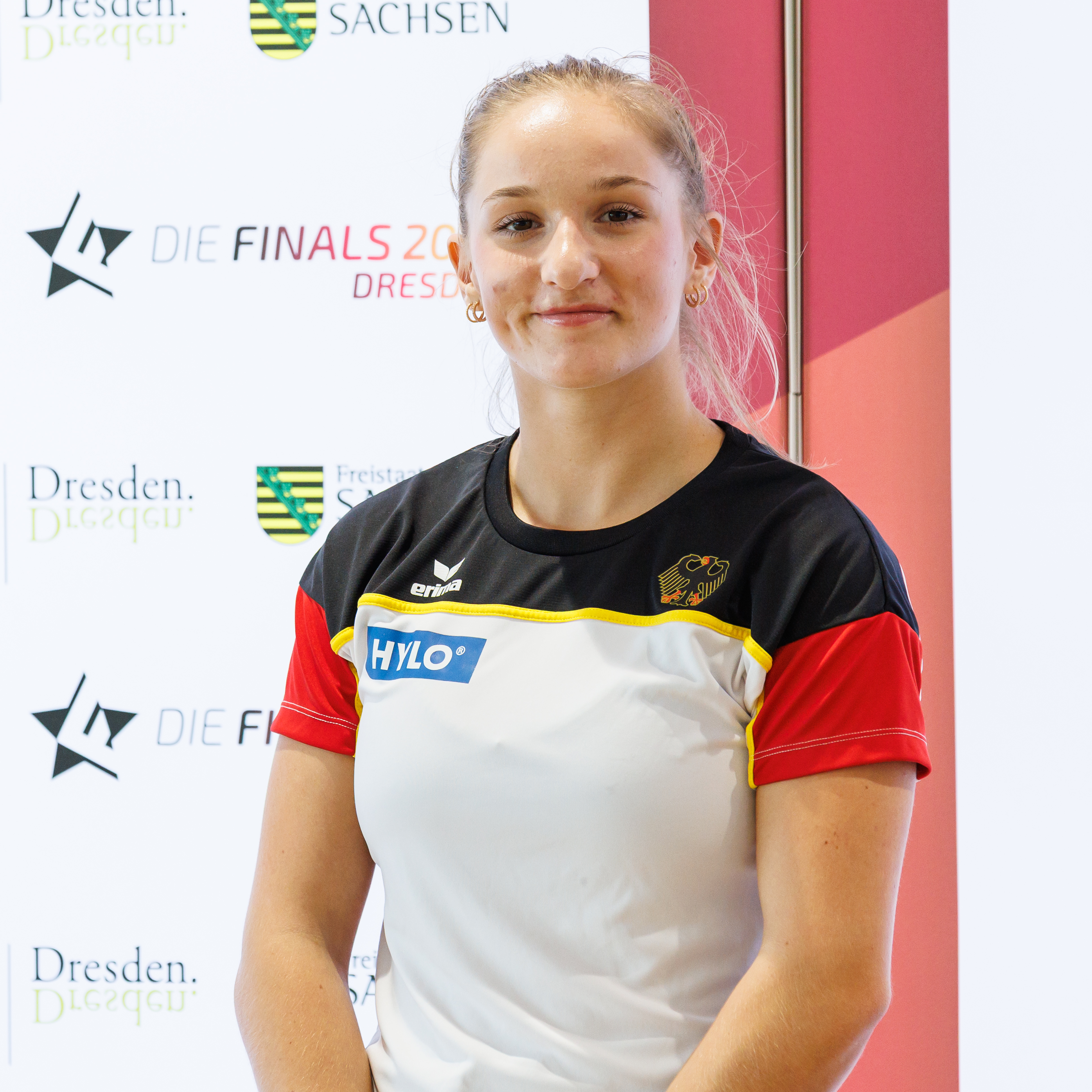
- Schönmaier 2025 in Dresden

Personal information
- Full name: Karina Schönmaier
- Born: 4 August 2005 (age 21) Bremen, Germany

Gymnastics career
- Discipline: Women's artistic gymnastics
- Country represented: Germany; (2021–present)
- Club: TuS Chemnitz-Altendorf
Medal record
Artistic gymnastics
Representing Germany
European Championships
Gold medal – first place	2025 Leipzig	Mixed team
Gold medal – first place	2025 Leipzig	Vault
Silver medal – second place	2025 Leipzig	Team
Silver medal – second place	2026 Zagreb	Vault
FIG World Cup
Event / 1st / 2nd / 3rd; Apparatus World Cup / 1 / 1 / 0

Karina Schönmaier (born 4 August 2005) is a German artistic gymnast. She is the 2025 European Champion on vault.

== Gymnastics career ==
=== 2022–2024 ===
In 2022, Schönmaier competed at the DTB Pokal Team Challenge where she won bronze on vault. Later that year, she competed at her first World Championships. Initially she was the second reserve for the all-around final but was substituted in after both Flávia Saraiva and Tang Xijing withdrew; she ultimately finished 22nd. The following year she once again competed at both the DTB Pokal Team Challenge and the World Championships; she won silver on vault at the former.

In 2024, Schönmaier competed at her first European Championships where she helped Germany placed sixth as a team. Individually she qualified to the vault final where she finished fifth. She next competed at the Varna World Challenge Cup where she won silver on vault and bronze on floor exercise. Schönmaier was a selected as a reserve athlete for the 2024 Olympic Games, with the berth ultimately going to Helen Kevric. She competed at the 2024 Swiss Cup, replacing the injured Angela Andreoli, and was partnered with Mario Macchiati; together they placed third in the competition.

=== 2025 ===
In early 2025 Schönmaier competed at the DTB Pokal Mixed Cup, helping Germany win silver behind the United States. She next competed at the 2025 City of Jesolo Trophy where she won gold on vault.

At the 2025 European Championships Schönmaier helped Germany win the team silver medal behind Italy, their highest team placement in history. She qualified for the inaugural Mixed Team event alongside compatriot Timo Eder. Together they won gold ahead of the British pair of Jake Jarman and Ruby Evans. During event finals she won gold on vault, becoming the first German to win the title since Oksana Chusovitina won it in 2008. She ended the competition placing sixth on floor exercise.

At the 2025 World Championships in Jakarta, Schönmaier qualified in sixth place to the all-around final and in fourth place to the vault final. She finished in 19th place in the all-around final after mistakes on the balance beam and floor exercise. In the vault final, she received a 2.0 point deduction on her Cheng vault for only using one hand to propel herself off the table, and finished in fifth place with a two-vault score of 13.483.

=== 2026 ===
Schönmaier competed at the World Cups in Cottbus and Osijek. On vault she won silver at the former and gold at the latter. She was selected to compete at the 2026 European Championships alongside Helen Kevric, Pauline Schäfer-Betz, Silja Stöhr, and Lea Marie Quaas. During event finals Schönmaier won silver on vault behind Angelina Melnikova. On the final day of the competition, she helped Germany finish fifth as a team.

In October, Schönmaier was named to the German team for the 2026 World Championships with teammates Kevric, Quaas, Madita Mayr, Jesenia Schäfer, and Emma Malewski.

== Competitive history ==
Competitive history of Karina Schönmaier at the junior level
Year	Event	Team	AA	VT	UB	BB	FX
2017	German Championships		7				6
2018	German Championships		11				
2019	Pre-Olympic Youth Cup		3rd place, bronze medalist(s)				
2019	German Championships		5	4	5	4	
2019	German Junior Cup		6				
2020	German Championships		1st place, gold medalist(s)	3rd place, bronze medalist(s)	4	1st place, gold medalist(s)	2nd place, silver medalist(s)

Competitive history of Karina Schönmaier at the senior level
Year	Event	Team	AA	VT	UB	BB	FX
2021	German Championships		14	3rd place, bronze medalist(s)			
2022	DTB Pokal Team Challenge	7		3rd place, bronze medalist(s)			
2022	German Championships		8	2nd place, silver medalist(s)			
2022	World Championships	12	22				
2023	DTB Pokal Team Challenge	7		2nd place, silver medalist(s)			
2023	German Championships		10	2nd place, silver medalist(s)			
2023	Heidelberg Friendly	1st place, gold medalist(s)	4				
2023	World Championships	13					
2024	DTB Pokal Mixed Cup	3rd place, bronze medalist(s)					
2024	City of Jesolo Trophy	8	18	2nd place, silver medalist(s)			
2024	European Championships	6	14	5			
2024	Varna World Challenge Cup			2nd place, silver medalist(s)			3rd place, bronze medalist(s)
2024	German Championships		3rd place, bronze medalist(s)	1st place, gold medalist(s)	3rd place, bronze medalist(s)		2nd place, silver medalist(s)
2024	German Olympic Trials		2nd place, silver medalist(s)				
2024	Haguenau Friendly	2nd place, silver medalist(s)	1st place, gold medalist(s)				
2024	Arthur Gander Memorial		2nd place, silver medalist(s)				
2024	Swiss Cup	3rd place, bronze medalist(s)					
2025	DTB Pokal Mixed Cup	2nd place, silver medalist(s)					
2025	City of Jesolo Trophy	8		1st place, gold medalist(s)			
2025	European Championships	2nd place, silver medalist(s)	WD	1st place, gold medalist(s)			6
2025	European Championships Mixed Team	1st place, gold medalist(s)	—N/a				
2025	German Championships		1st place, gold medalist(s)	2nd place, silver medalist(s)	2nd place, silver medalist(s)	3rd place, bronze medalist(s)	1st place, gold medalist(s)
2025	Paris World Challenge Cup			2nd place, silver medalist(s)			
2025	World Championships	—N/a	19	5			
2026	Cottbus World Cup			2nd place, silver medalist(s)			
2026	DTB Pokal Mixed Cup	1st place, gold medalist(s)					
2026	Osijek World Cup			1st place, gold medalist(s)			6
2026	German Championships		2nd place, silver medalist(s)	1st place, gold medalist(s)	4		1st place, gold medalist(s)
2026	European Championships	5		2nd place, silver medalist(s)			
2026	World Championships	10					
2026	Arthur Gander Memorial		2nd place, silver medalist(s)				
2026	Swiss Cup	2nd place, silver medalist(s)					
