= Emma Malewski =

German artistic gymnast

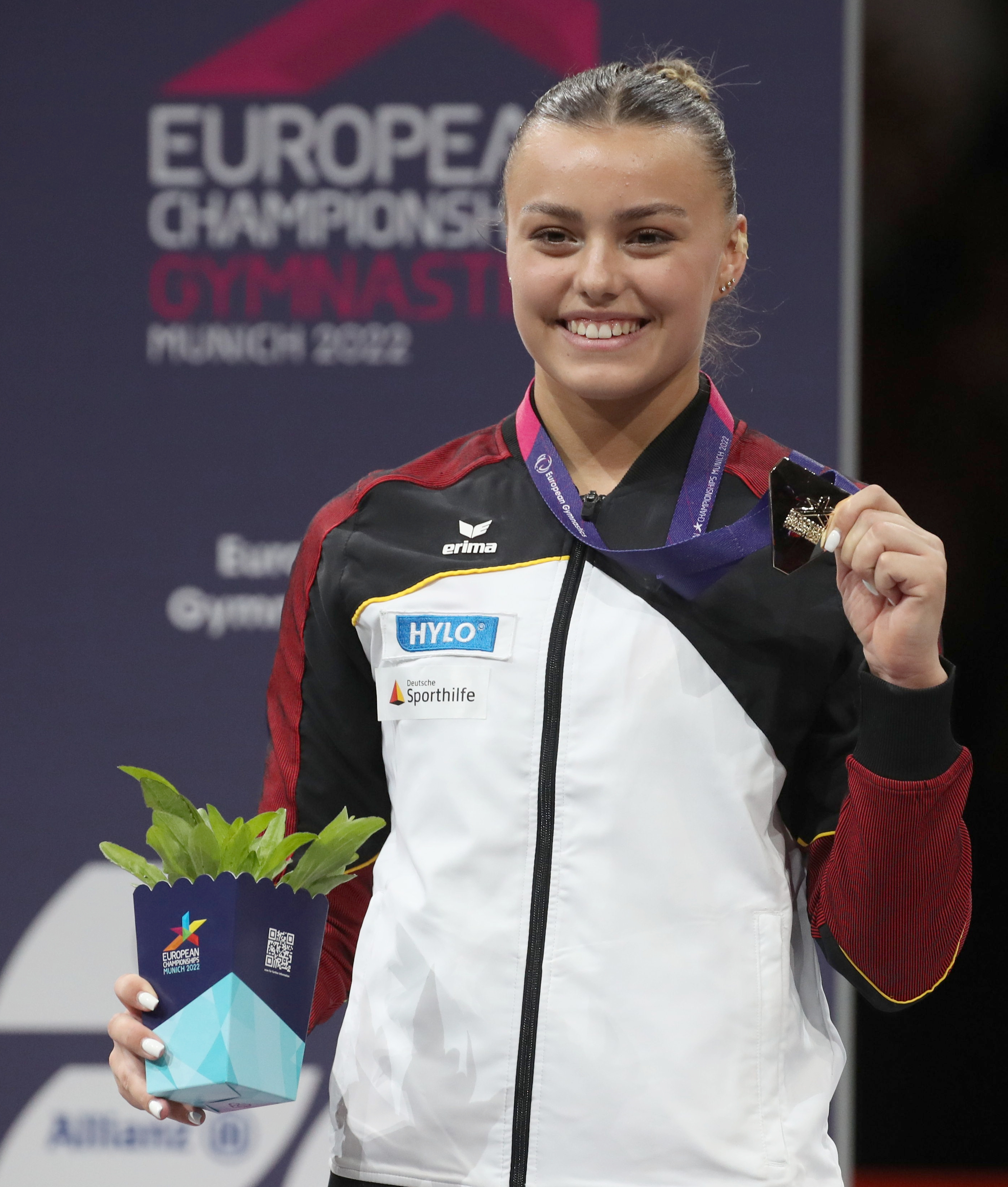
- Malewski at the 2022 European Championships

Personal information
- Full name: Emma Leonie Malewski
- Born: 18 July 2004 (age 22) Hamburg, Germany
- Height: 1.62 m (5 ft 4 in)

Gymnastics career
- Discipline: Women's artistic gymnastics
- Country represented: Germany; (2016–present)
- College team: Clemson Tigers (2026–29)
- Club: TuS 1861 Chemnitz-Altendorf
- Head coach: Sabine Petermann
- Assistant coaches: Romy Nürnberger; Ben Möbius
Medal record
Women's artistic gymnastics
Representing Germany
European Championships
Gold medal – first place	2022 Munich	Balance beam
Bronze medal – third place	2022 Munich	Team
World University Games
Bronze medal – third place	2025 Rhine-Ruhr	Balance beam

Emma Leonie Malewski (born 18 July 2004) is a German artistic gymnast who represented Germany at the inaugural Junior World Championships. She is the 2022 European champion on the balance beam, and was part of the first German team to ever win a European team medal in women's artistic gymnastics. She currently competes for the Clemson Tigers in NCAA gymnastics in the United States.

== Early life ==
Malewski was born in Hamburg in 2004. She currently trains in Chemnitz.

== Junior gymnastics career ==
=== 2016–2017 ===
In 2016 Malewski competed at both the German National Championships and the German Cup, where she placed ninth and fourth respectively. She competed at the Turnkunst International competition where she helped her team finish sixth and individually she placed third in the espoir division.

In 2017 Malewski competed at the German National Championships where she placed second in the all-around behind Aiyu Zhu; however she won the gold medal on floor exercise. She competed at the junior Swiss Cup where she helped her team finish first.

=== 2018 ===
Malewski competed at the 2018 City of Jesolo Trophy where she finished 17th in the all-around. In May she competed at the German Junior National Championships where she won the bronze medal in the all-around. Additionally she won the bronze on balance beam and uneven bars and won gold on floor exercise. The following month Malewski competed at a friendly competition in Pieve di Soligo where she helped Germany place fourth and individually she placed thirteenth in the all-around.

In August Malewski was selected to represent Germany at the 2018 European Championships alongside Emelie Petz, Lisa Zimmermann, Lara Hinsberger, and Leonie Papke. Together they finished seventh in the team final.

=== 2019 ===
Malewski competed at the 2019 City of Jesolo Trophy where she helped Germany finish seventh as a team and individually she finished seventh on the balance beam. She next competed at the German National Championships where she won the all-around competition. Additionally she placed first on uneven bars, balance beam, and floor exercise. In June Malewski competed at the Flanders International Team Challenge in Ghent, Belgium. Germany placed sixth in the team final. Individually Malewski placed fifteenth in the all-around.

Malewski was selected to represent Germany at the inaugural Junior World Championships alongside Jasmin Haase and Lea Marie Quaas. Together they finished eighth as a team and Malewski finished sixteenth in the all-around.

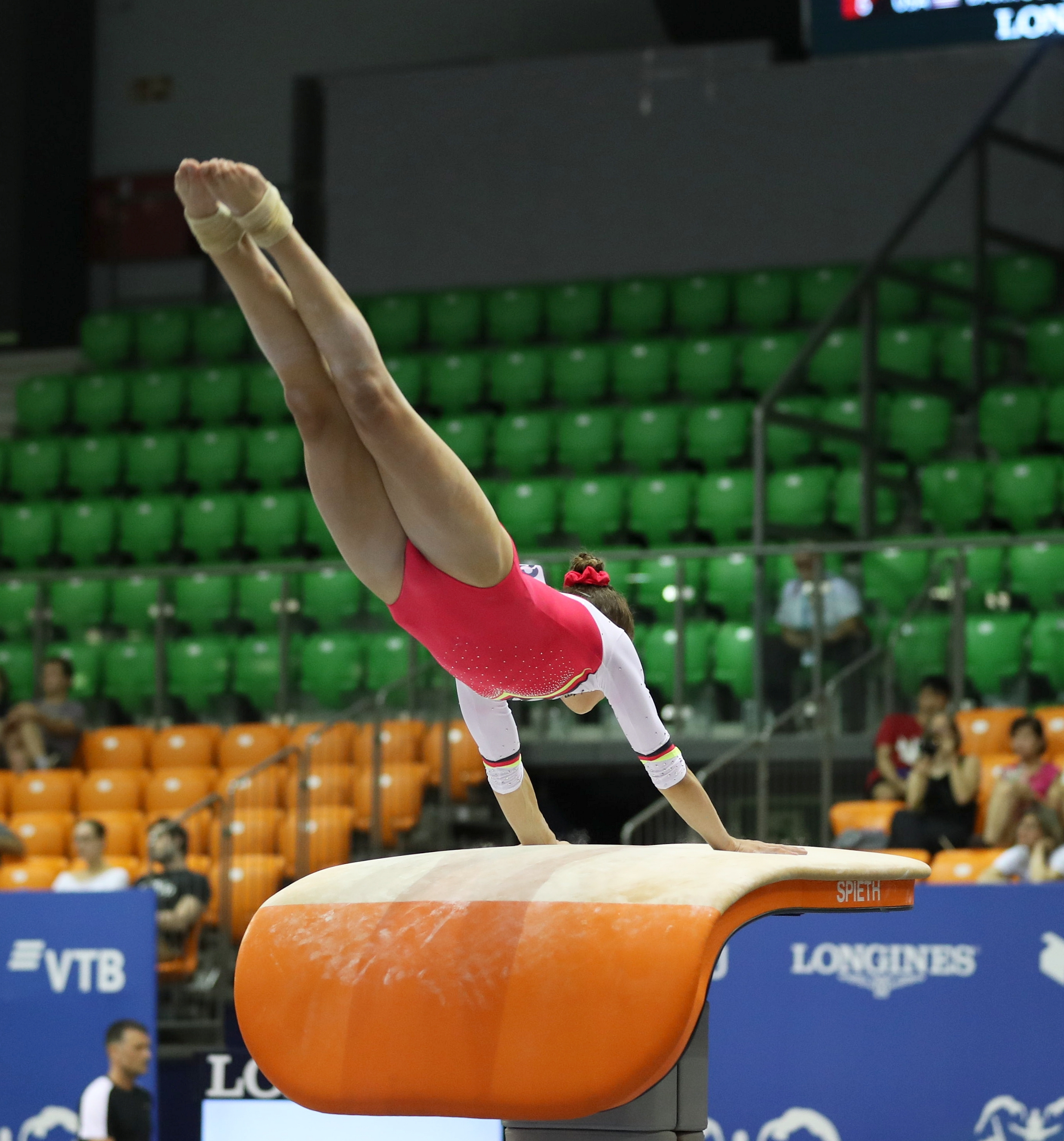
Vault

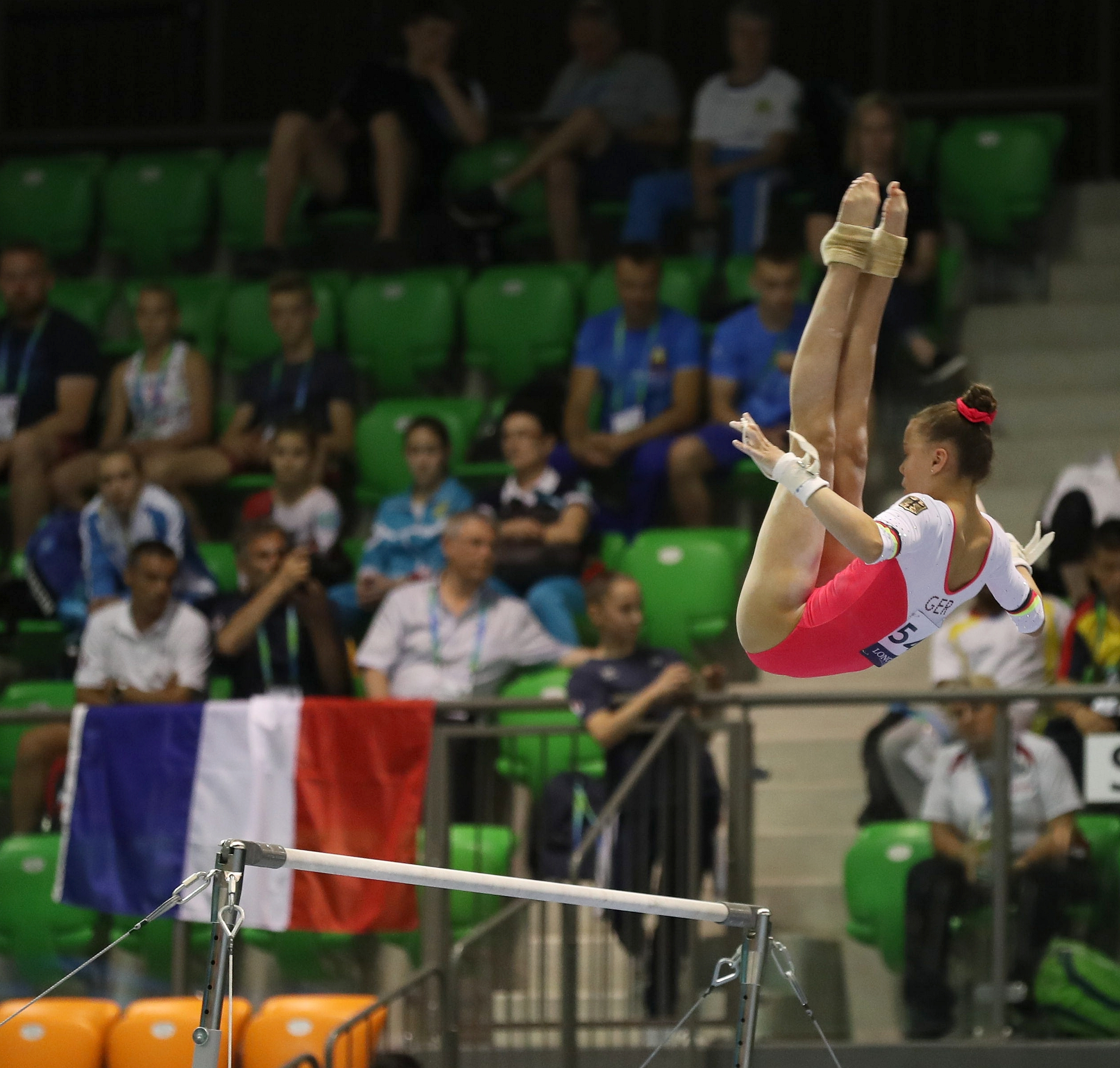
Uneven Bars

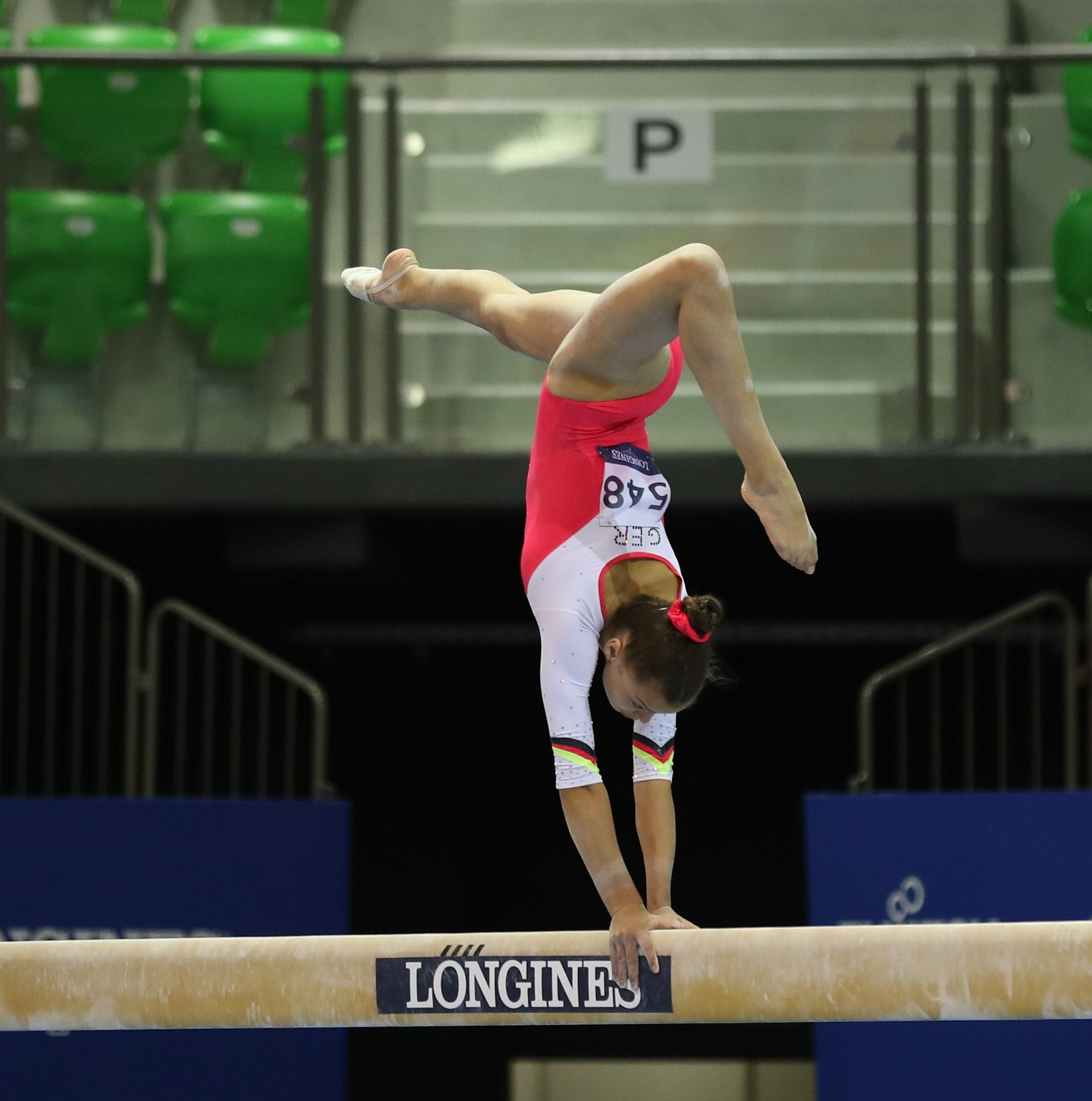
Balance Beam

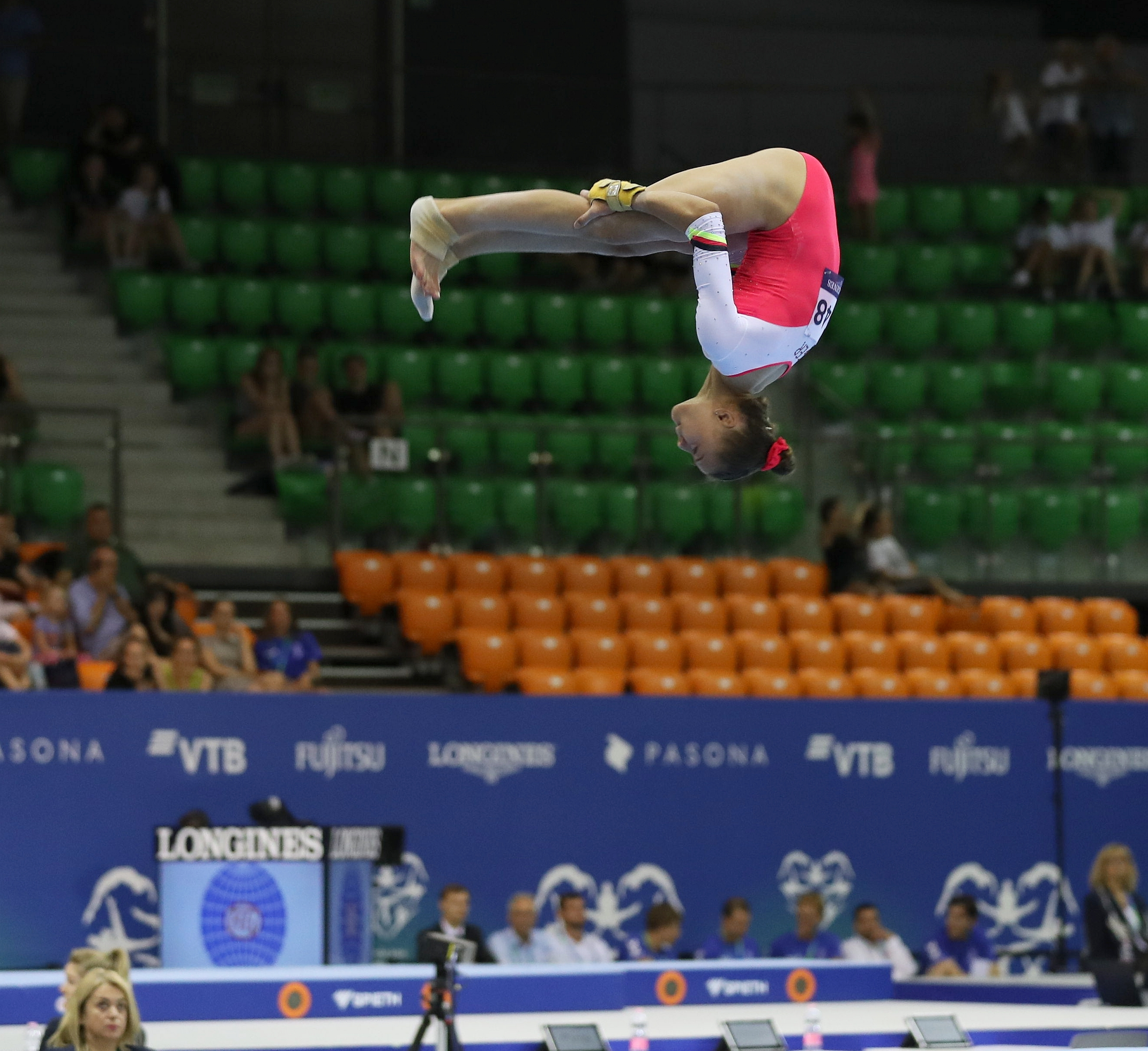
Floor Exercise

Malewski at the 2019 Junior World Championships

== Senior gymnastics career ==
=== 2020–21 ===
Malewski turned senior in 2020; however most competitions were canceled or postponed due to the COVID-19 pandemic.

In 2021 Malewski made her senior international debut at the European Championships. She finished 40th during qualifications and did not advance to any event finals. In June she competed at her first senior level national championships; she finished sixth in the all-around and third on balance beam. In July she competed at the Flanders International Team Challenge where Germany placed sixth. Individually Malewski placed eleventh in the all-around and fifth on balance beam.

=== 2022 ===
In June, Malewski competed at the German Championships, where she took the bronze medal in the all-around, as well as in the uneven bars and balance beam finals, and finished fifth in the floor final.

In August, Malewski competed at the European Championships in Munich, where she helped Germany qualify to the team final in fourth place. Individually, she also qualified to the balance beam final in second place. In the team final, the German team of Malewski, Kim Bui, Pauline Schäfer, Sarah Voss and Elisabeth Seitz won the bronze medal behind Italy and Great Britain — Germany's first team medal in European Championship history. In the beam final, Malewski won the gold medal ahead of Ondine Achampong and Carolann Héduit with a score of 13.466.

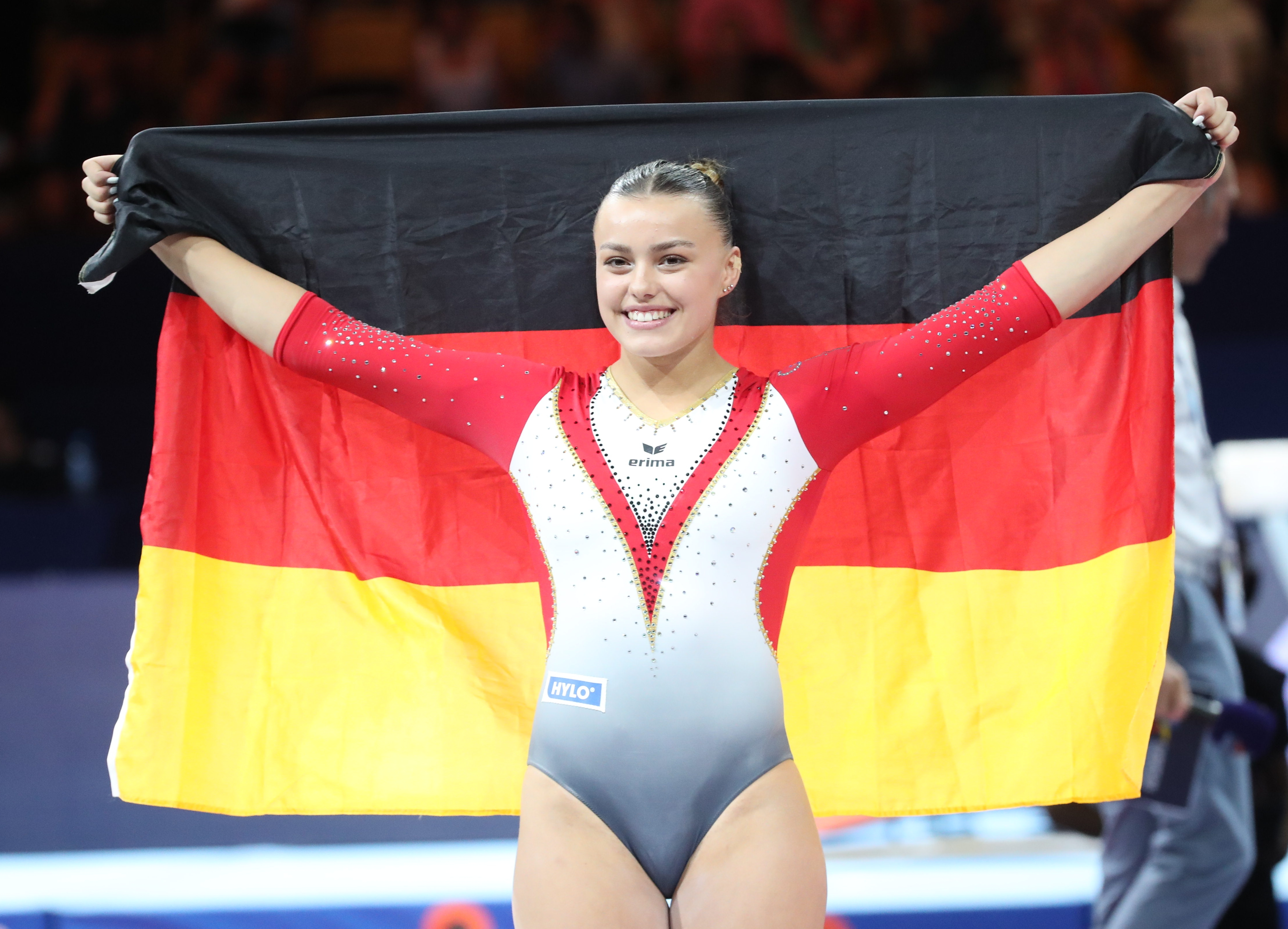
With German flag

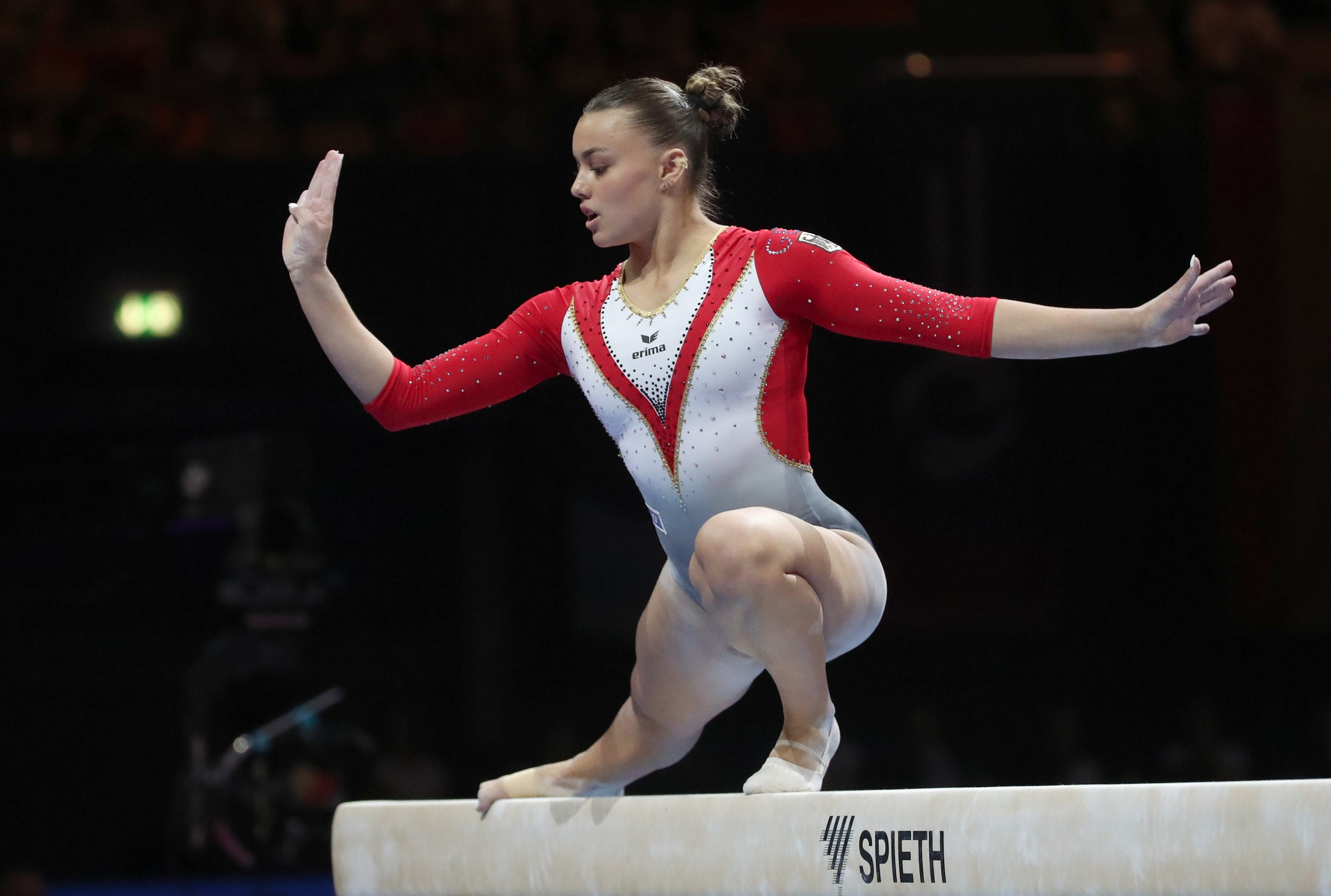
Balance beam final

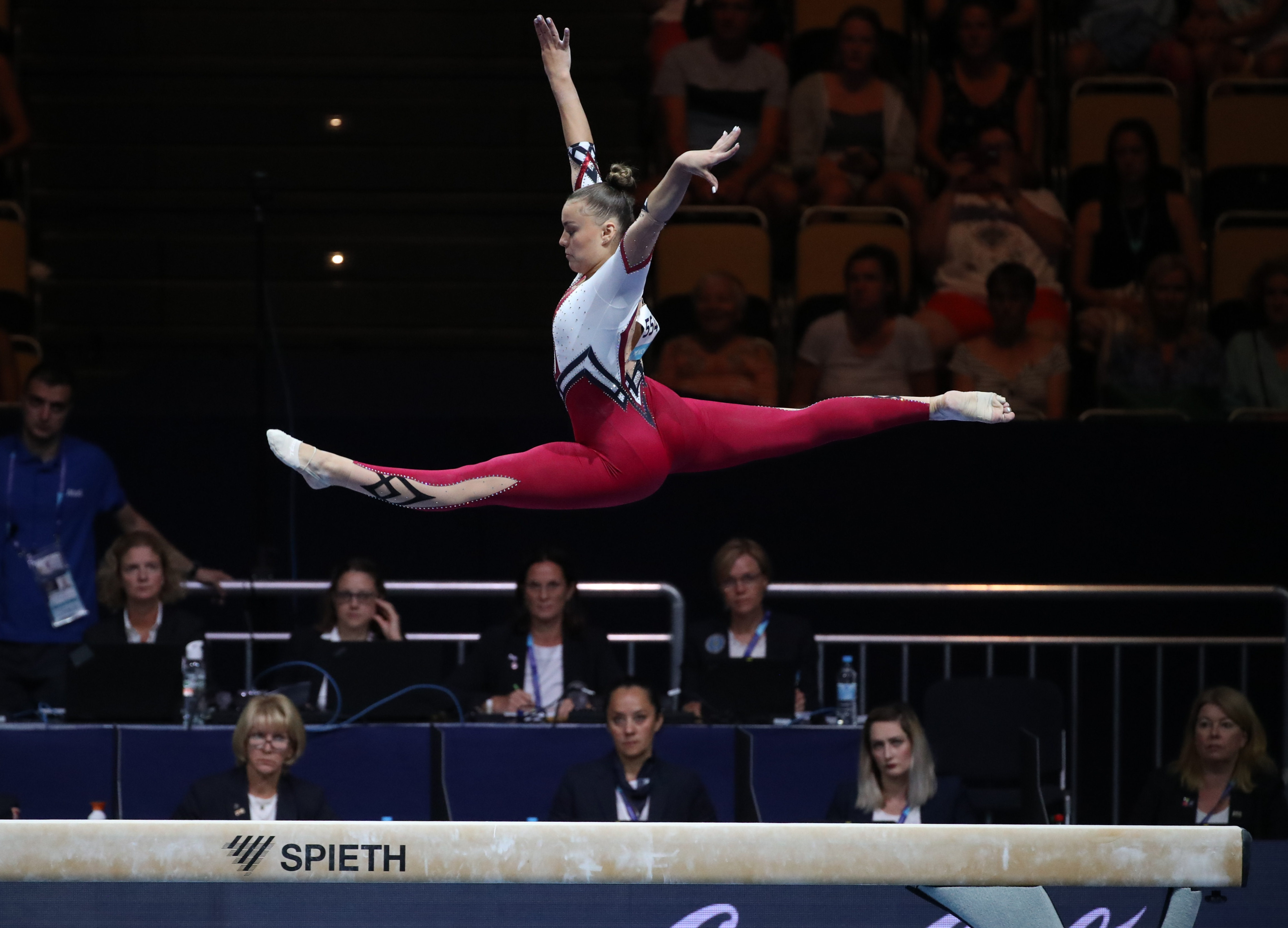
Balance beam (qualification)

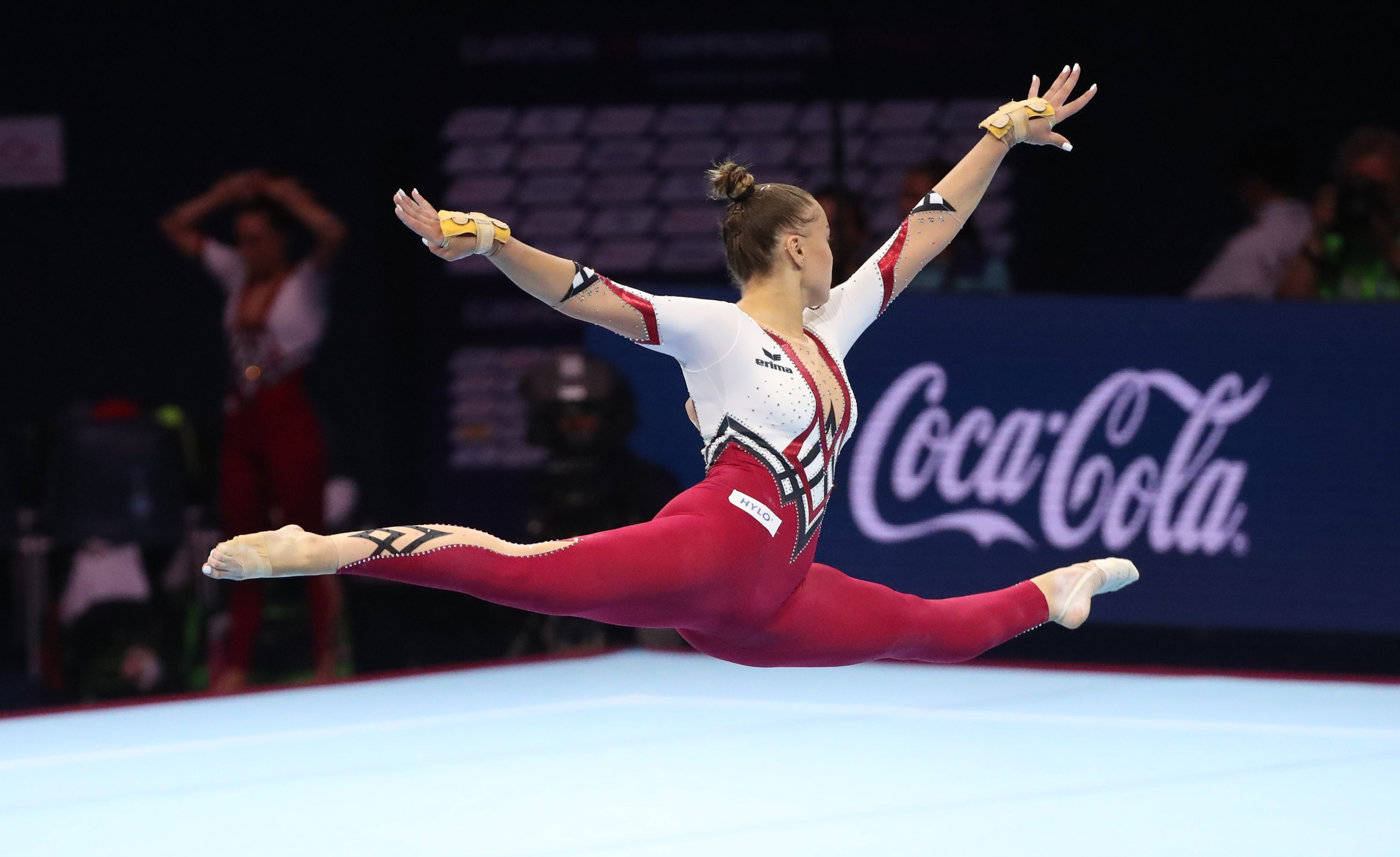
Floor exercise (qualification)

Malewski at the 2022 European Championships

=== 2023–2024 ===
Malewski competed at the 2023 Doha World Cup where she won bronze on balance beam behind Sabrina Voinea and Anna Lashchevska. At the 2023 European Championships she helped Germany finish ninth as a team. Malewski was selected to compete at the 2023 World Championships; however she tore her anterior syndesmosis ligament in her left foot and had to withdraw from the competition.

In early 2024 Malewski suffered cartilage damage in her right shoulder, resulting in a torn labrum. As a result, she was unable to contend for Germany's 2024 Olympic berth.

=== 2025 ===
Malewski intended to make her comeback at the DTB Pokal Team Challenge but she had to withdraw after she sustained a muscle injury to her right calf. In July Malewski announced her commitment to compete for the Clemson Tigers in NCAA gymnastics in the United States, starting in the 2025–2026 season. She was selected to compete at the World University Games taking place in late July. While there she won bronze on balance beam behind Urara Ashikawa and Tonya Paulsson.

=== 2026 ===
In January 2026, Malewski began her career as a collegiate gymnast. She competed at twelve meets during the 2026 season, contributing on uneven bars and balance beam and helping the Clemson Tigers win the ACC Championship title.

Malewski returned to elite gymnastics in September. On October 5, she was named to the six-person German squad for the 2026 World Championships with teammates Helen Kevric, Karina Schönmaier, Madita Mayr, Lea Marie Quaas, and Jesenia Schäfer. At the time of the announcement, the German Federation had not yet determined if Schäfer or Malewski would be serving as the traveling alternate. However, as of October 15, Schäfer had withdrawn due to injury, with Malewski being named as one of the five competing athletes.

== Competitive history ==
Competitive history of Emma Malewski at the junior level
Year	Event	Team	AA	VT	UB	BB	FX
2016	German Championships		9			5	
2016	German Cup		4				
2016	Turnkunst International	6	3rd place, bronze medalist(s)				
2017	German Championships		2nd place, silver medalist(s)		4		1st place, gold medalist(s)
2017	Swiss Cup Juniors	1st place, gold medalist(s)	6				
2018	City of Jesolo Trophy	9	17				
2018	German Championships		3rd place, bronze medalist(s)		3rd place, bronze medalist(s)	3rd place, bronze medalist(s)	1st place, gold medalist(s)
2018	Pieve di Soligo Friendly	4	13				
2018	European Championships	7					
2019	City of Jesolo Trophy	7				7	
2019	German Championships		1st place, gold medalist(s)		1st place, gold medalist(s)	1st place, gold medalist(s)	1st place, gold medalist(s)
2019	FIT Challenge	7	15				
2019	Junior World Championships	8	16		R1		

Competitive history of Emma Malewski at the senior level
Year	Event	Team	AA	VT	UB	BB	FX
2021
2021	European Championships		40				
2021	German Championships		6		5	3rd place, bronze medalist(s)	4
2021	Olympic Trials		7				
2021	FIT Challenge	6	11			5	
2022	German Championships		3rd place, bronze medalist(s)		3rd place, bronze medalist(s)	3rd place, bronze medalist(s)	5
2022	European Championships	3rd place, bronze medalist(s)	13			1st place, gold medalist(s)	
2022	World Championships	R4					
2023	Doha World Cup					3rd place, bronze medalist(s)	
2023	DTB Pokal Team Challenge	7					
2023	European Championships	9					
2023	German Championships		2nd place, silver medalist(s)		4	2nd place, silver medalist(s)	5
2023	Heidelberg Friendly	1st place, gold medalist(s)	3rd place, bronze medalist(s)				
2025	World University Games	15				3rd place, bronze medalist(s)	
2026
2026	World Championships	10					
