= Sarah Voss =

German artistic gymnast

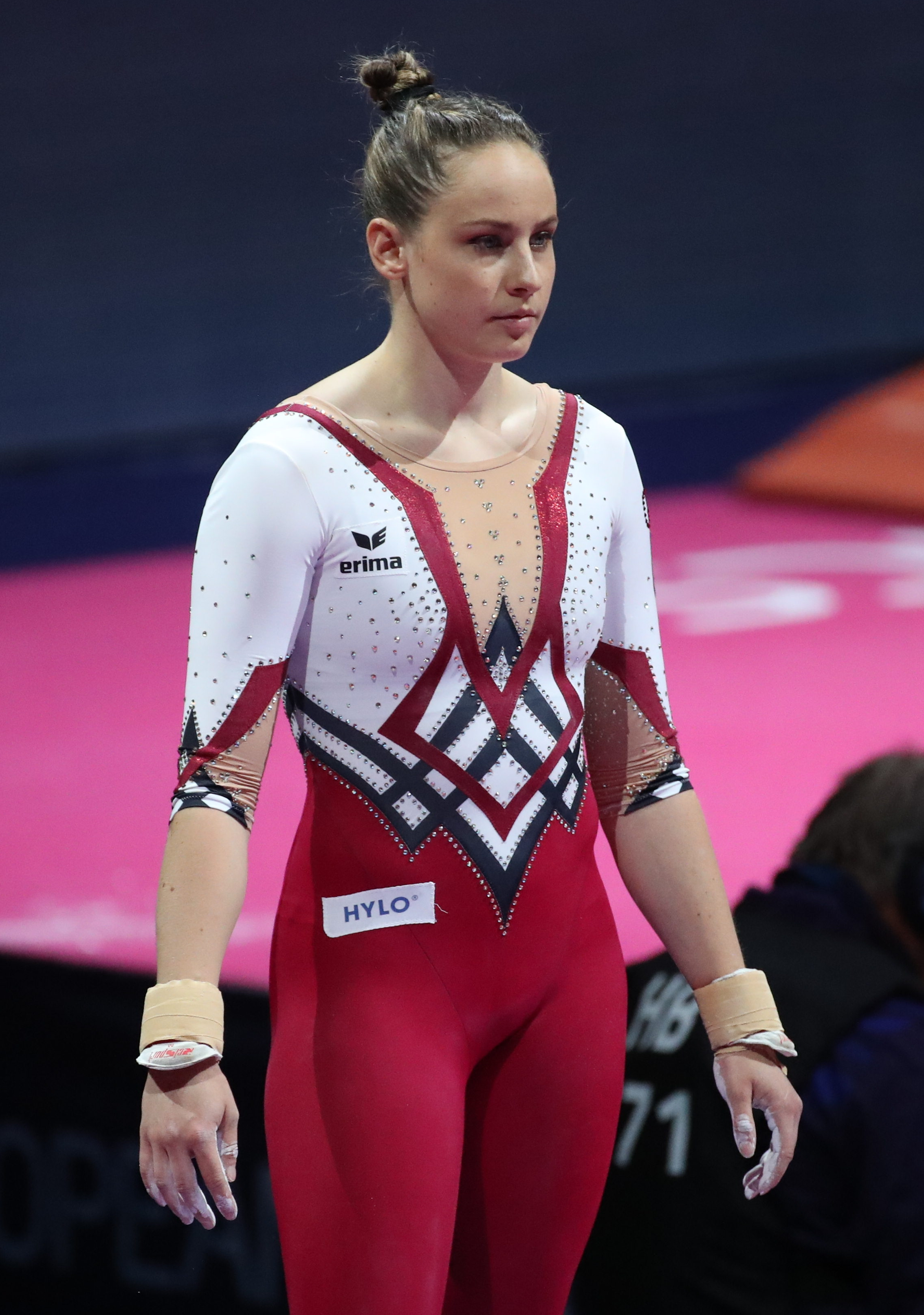
- Voss at the 2022 European Championships

Personal information
- Full name: Sarah Voss
- Born: 21 October 1999 (age 26) Frankfurt am Main, Germany
- Height: 1.67 m (5 ft 6 in)

Gymnastics career
- Discipline: Women's artistic gymnastics
- Country represented: Germany; (2015–2025)
- Club: TZ DSHS Cologne
- Head coach: Shanna Poljakova
- Retired: July 30, 2025
Medal record
Women's artistic gymnastics
Representing Germany
European Championships
Bronze medal – third place	2022 Munich	Team
FIG World Cup
Event / 1st / 2nd / 3rd; Apparatus World Cup / 1 / 1 / 0

Sarah Voss (born 21 October 1999) is a German former artistic gymnast. She represented Germany at the 2020 and 2024 Summer Olympics. She is the 2019 and 2022 German all-around national champion. She was part of the bronze medal-winning German team at the 2022 European Championships.

== Personal life ==
Voss was born in Frankfurt am Main, Germany in 1999. She resides in Dormagen and trained at TZ DSHS Köln.

== Gymnastics career ==
=== 2015 ===
Voss turned senior in 2015 and competed at the German Championships where she placed sixth in the all-around, fifth on uneven bars, and sixth on floor exercise. In October, she competed at the Worlds Selection Trials where she once again placed sixth in the all-around but was not named to the team to compete at the 2015 World Championships. The following week, she competed at the Länderkampf Kunstturnen where she helped Germany finish second behind Brazil. She finished the season at the Toyota International Cup where she placed sixth on the uneven bars and eighth on floor exercise.

=== 2016 ===
Voss competed at the DTB Pokal Team Challenge where she helped Germany win the silver behind Russia. She later competed at the Doha World Cup where she placed seventh on floor exercise. She was selected to represent Germany at the European Championships alongside Kim Bui, Lina Philipp, Maike Enderle, and Amélie Föllinger, and they finished seventh in the team final. In June, she competed at the German Championships where she placed seventh in the all-around and did not qualify to any event finals. At the Olympic Trials, she placed sixth in the all-around and was not named to the team to compete at the Olympic Games.

=== 2017 ===
In March, Voss competed at the DTB Pokal Team Challenge where she helped the Germany II team place fourth. Then in May, she competed at the FinGym Turku where she placed second on balance beam behind Tamara Mrdjenovic of Serbia but won gold on floor exercise. She then competed at the German Championships where she placed fifth in the all-around and fourth on balance beam. At the World Trials, she placed fifth in the all-around and was not named to the team to compete at the World Championships. At the Paris Challenge Cup, she placed fifth on vault and seventh on balance beam. She ended the season at the Toyota International Cup where she placed second in the all-around behind Sae Miyakawa of Japan, eighth on uneven bars and balance beam, and third on floor exercise behind Mai Murakami and Aiko Sugihara, both of Japan.

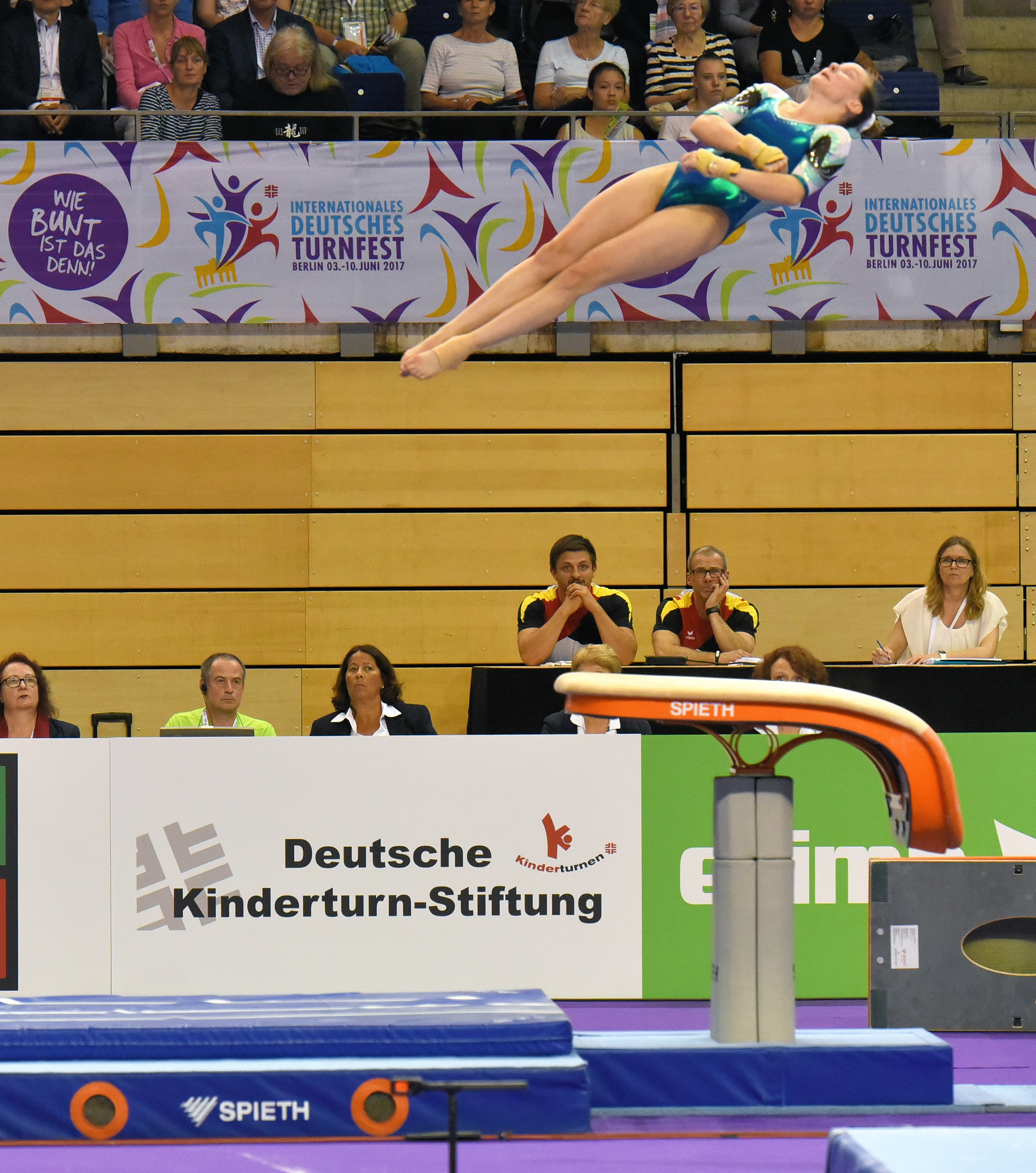
Vault

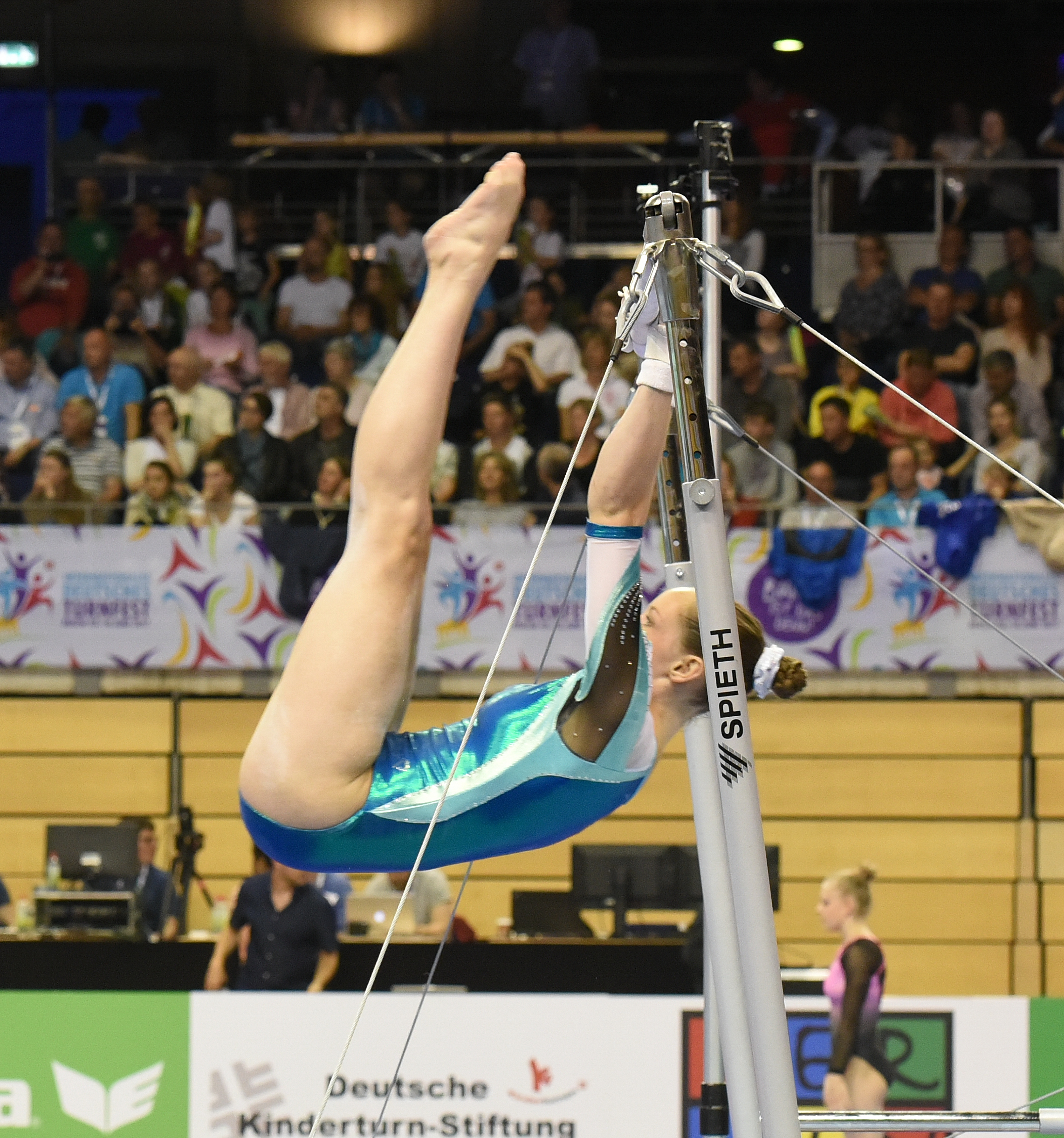
Uneven Bars

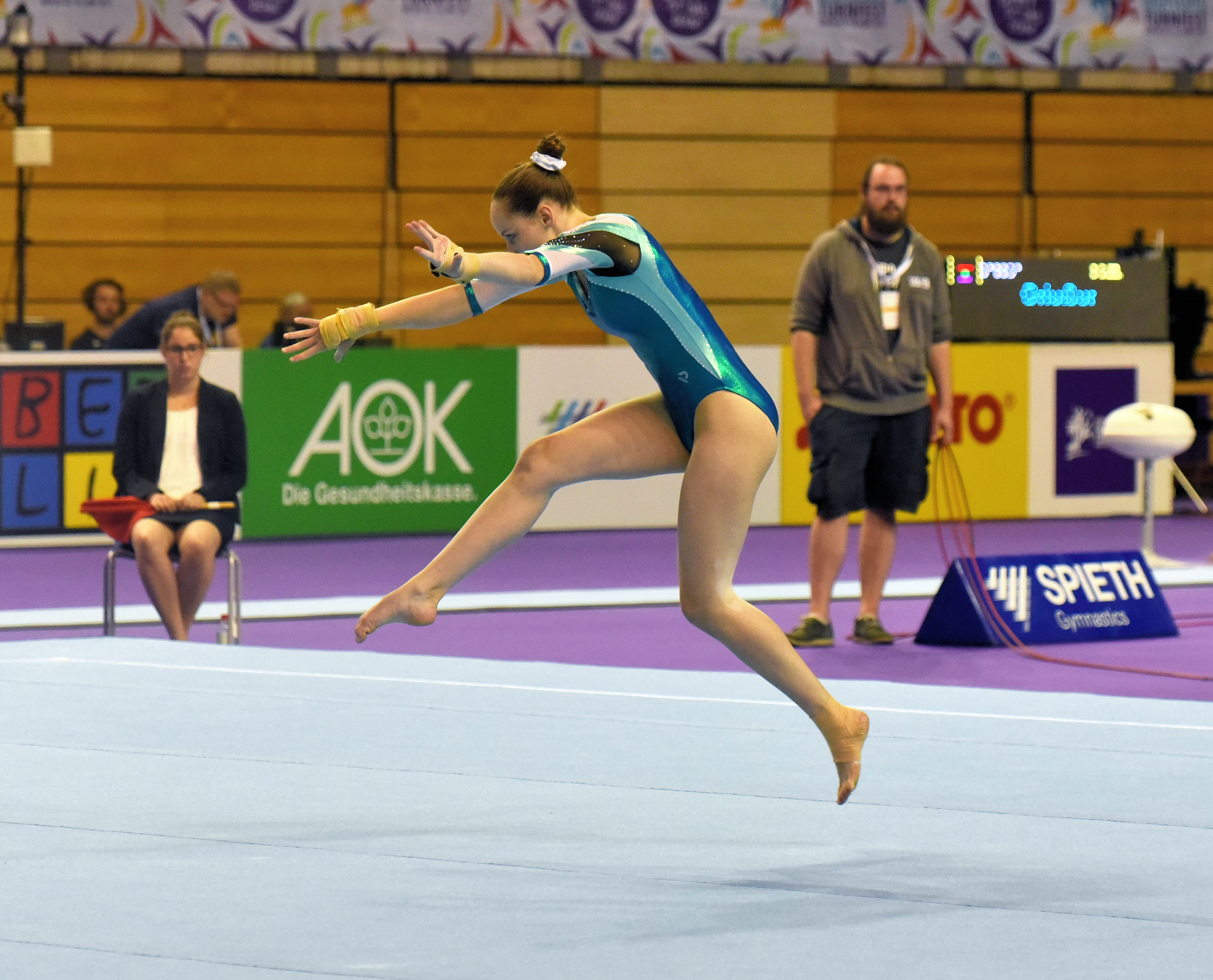
Floor Exercise

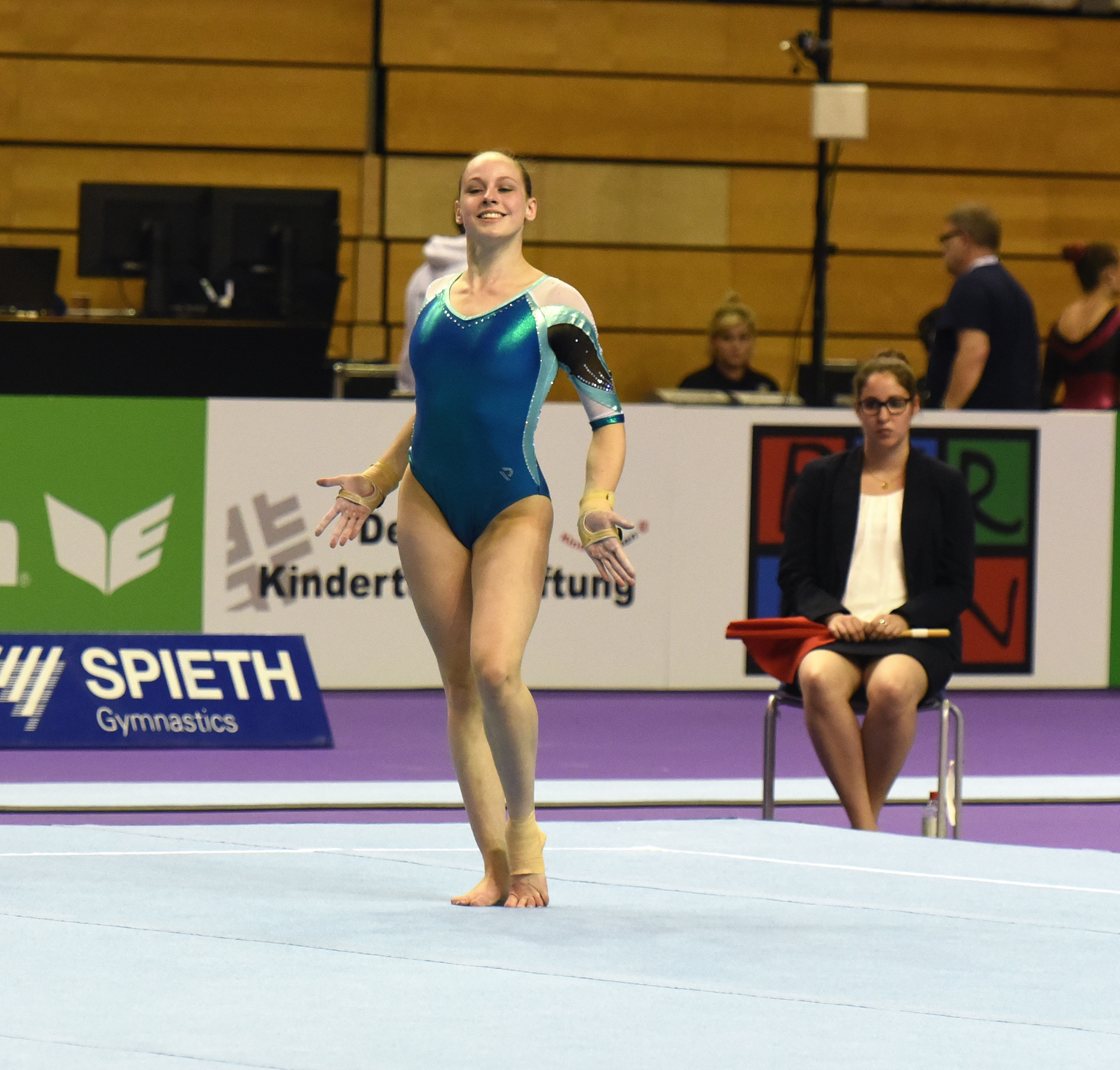
Floor Exercise

Voss at the 2017 German Championships

=== 2018 ===
Voss competed at both the Stuttgart and Birmingham World Cups where she placed fifth and eighth respectively. In June, she competed at the German European Championships trials where she placed second in the all-around behind Pauline Schäfer and was named to the team to compete at the European Championships alongside Schäfer, Kim Bui, Leah Griesser, and Emma Höfele. The team competed at the Sainté Gym Cup, a friendly meet in France, where they placed second behind France but ahead of Switzerland. At the European Championships, Voss helped Germany finish ninth in qualifications, and individually, she finished fourth in the vault final. In September, she competed at the German World Trials where she placed third behind Bui and Carina Kröll. Later that month, she competed at the German Championships where she placed sixth in the all-around but won gold on vault and balance beam. She was selected to compete at the 2018 World Championships in Doha alongside Elisabeth Seitz, Bui, Sophie Scheder, and Griesser. As a team, they finished eighth in the team final.

=== 2019 ===
Voss won her first all-around title at the German Championships. Additionally, she placed first on vault and balance beam and fifth on floor exercise. Later that month, she suffered a minor foot injury and missed the German World trials. She was still named to the team to compete at the 2019 World Championships in Stuttgart alongside Kim Bui, Emelie Petz, Elisabeth Seitz, and Sophie Scheder (later replaced by Pauline Schäfer). Later that month, she competed at a friendly competition in Worms, Germany where she helped Germany finish first ahead of Belgium, France, and a mixed team. Additionally, she posted the second-highest scores on the vault and balance beam.

At the World Championships Voss competed on all four events during qualification and helped Germany place ninth as a team. Although they did not qualify for the team final, they qualified a team to the 2020 Olympic Games in Tokyo. Individually, Voss qualified for the all-around and balance beam finals. In the all-around final, she finished in tenth place. During the balance beam final, she finished in seventh place. She ended the season at the Arthur Gander Memorial in Morges, Switzerland, where she finished second behind Lorette Charpy of France.

=== 2020 ===
In early 2020, it was announced that Voss would represent Germany at the American Cup, taking place on 7 March, and at the Tokyo World Cup taking place on 4 April. At the American Cup, Voss finished in eleventh place. Later that month it was announced that the Tokyo World Cup was canceled due to the coronavirus pandemic in Japan.

=== 2021 ===
At the 2021 European Championships, Voss became the first female gymnast to cover her legs at an international competition for a non-religious reason, when she wore a full-body suit. She won the bronze medal in the all-around at the German Championships and then won gold at the German Olympic Trials. On 13 June, she was selected to represent Germany at the 2020 Summer Olympics alongside Elisabeth Seitz, Kim Bui, and Pauline Schäfer. In qualifications at the Olympic Games Germany finished ninth as a team and did not advance to the finals.

=== 2022 ===
Voss competed at the DTB Pokal Mixed Cup where she helped Germany finish second behind the United States. She next competed at the Baku World Cup where she won gold on balance beam and placed fourth on the uneven bars. In June, she competed at the Osijek World Challenge Cup, where she took the silver medal in the uneven bars final behind Zója Székely, and finished fourth in the floor final. Later that month, Voss won the all-around at the German Championships and picked up the gold in the vault final and silver in the balance beam and floor exercise finals.

Voss competed at the European Championships in Munich, where she helped Germany qualify for the team final in fourth place. In the final, the German team of Voss, Kim Bui, Emma Malewski, Pauline Schäfer and Elisabeth Seitz won the bronze medal behind Italy and Great Britain — Germany's first team medal in European Championship history. In September, Voss announced that she would be unable to compete at the upcoming World Championships due to a calf injury.

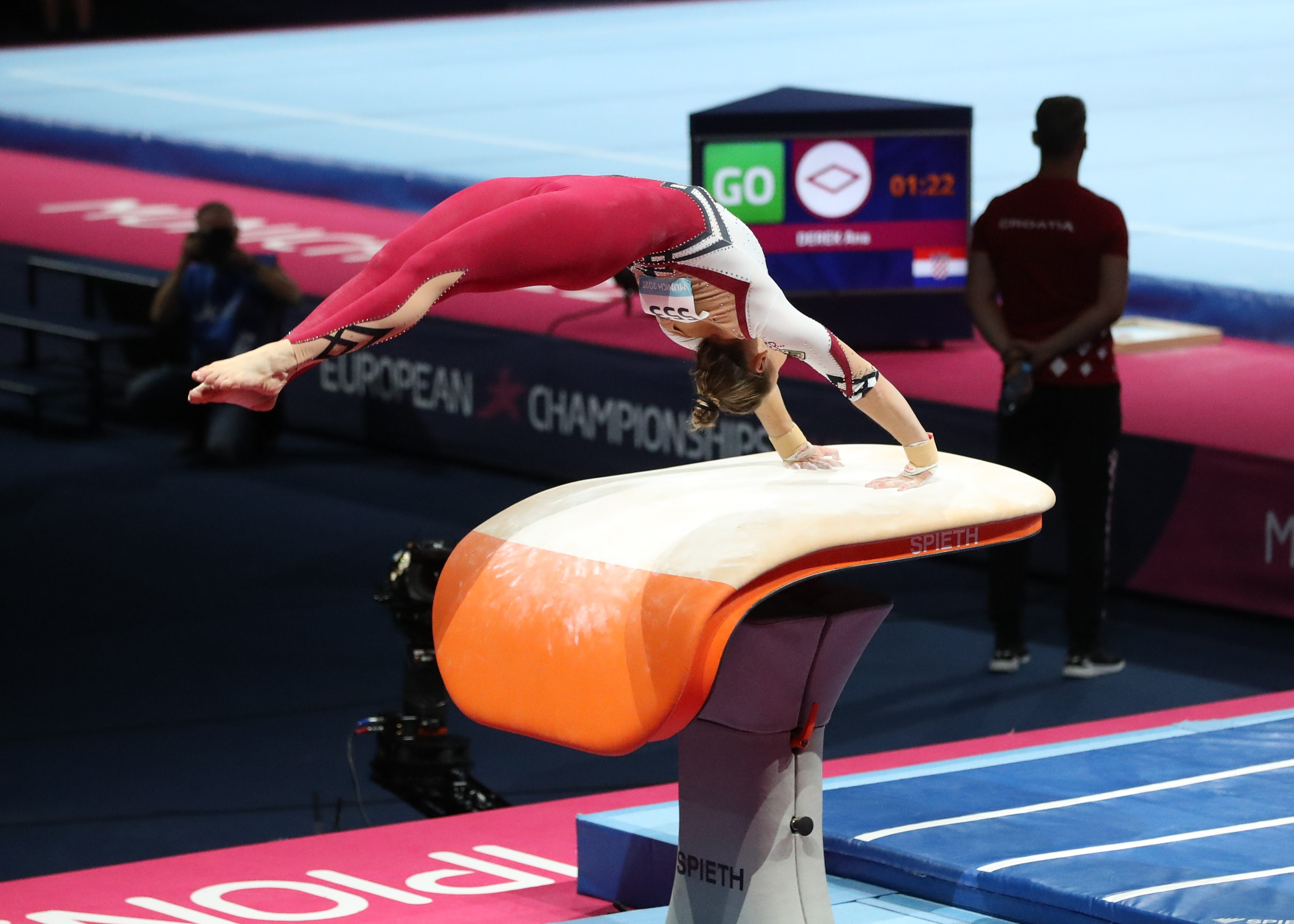
Vault

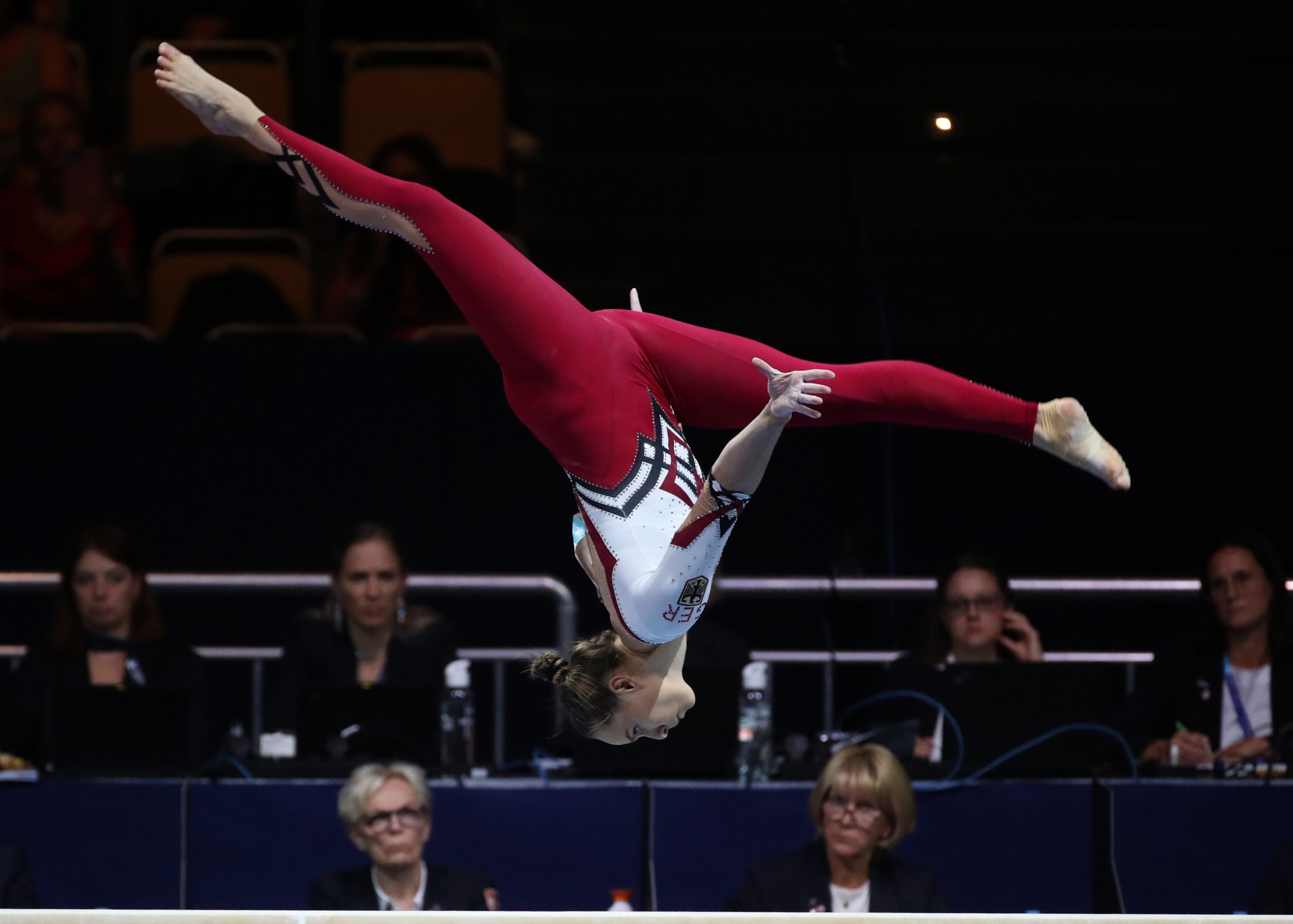
Balance beam

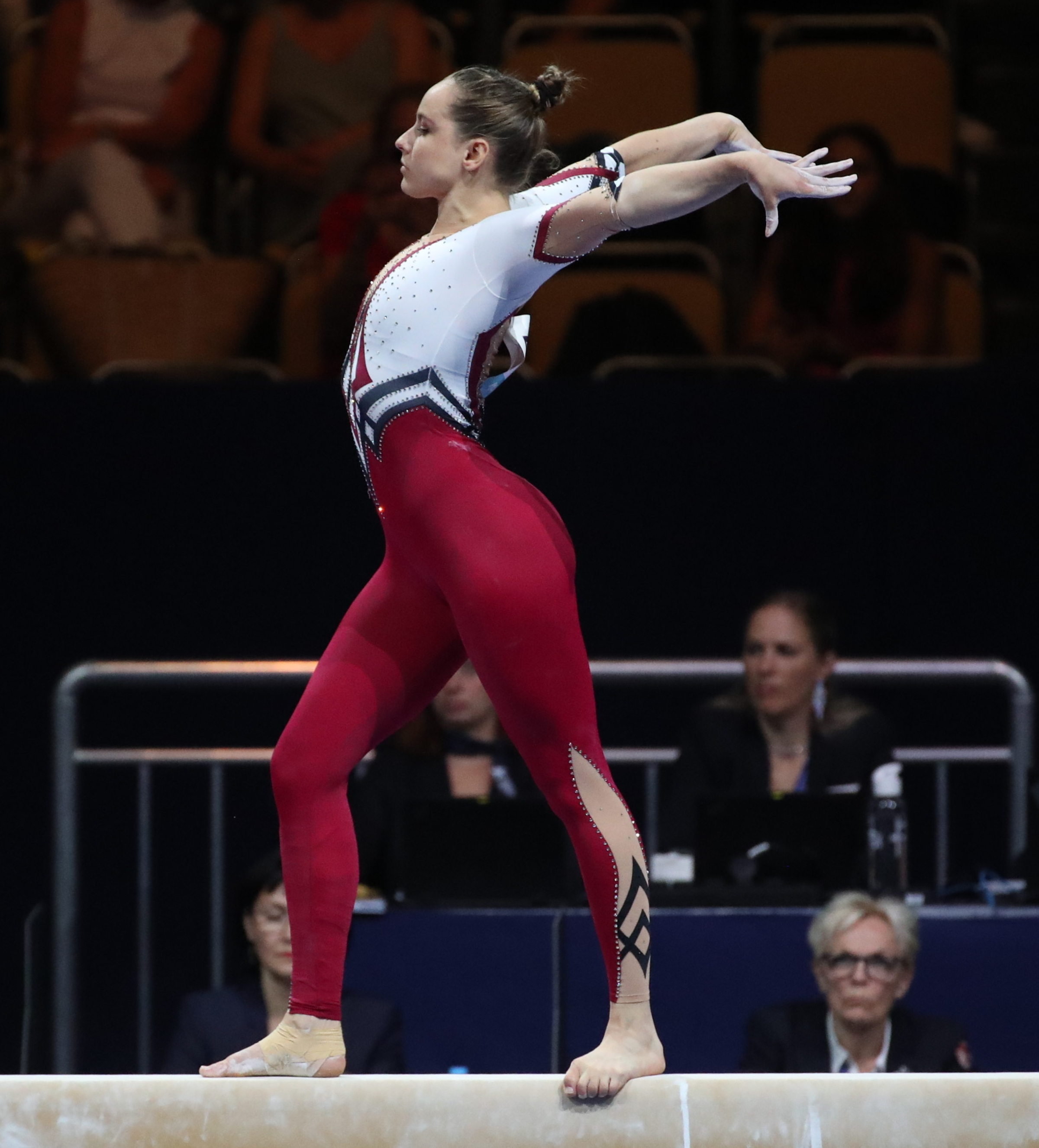
Balance beam

Floor exercise

Voss at the 2022 European Championships

=== 2023 ===
Voss competed at the DTB Pokal Mixed Cup, helping the German team win the silver medal behind Japan. Then at the European Championships, she placed 16th in the all-around. She missed the German Championships due to an ankle injury. She returned to competition at the Heidelberg Friendly where she helped Germany win the gold medal, and she won the silver medal in the all-around behind Romania's Ana Bărbosu. She then competed at the 2023 World Championships in Antwerp. She helped Germany finish 13th in qualifications; although Germany did not qualify a full team to the 2024 Olympic Games, Voss earned an individual berth as the highest placing eligible gymnast on floor exercise. During individual finals, Voss finished 22nd in the all-around.

=== 2024–2025 ===
At the 2024 Olympic Games Voss finished twenty-forth in the all-around final.

Voss announced her retirement from the sport on July 30, 2025.

== Competitive history ==
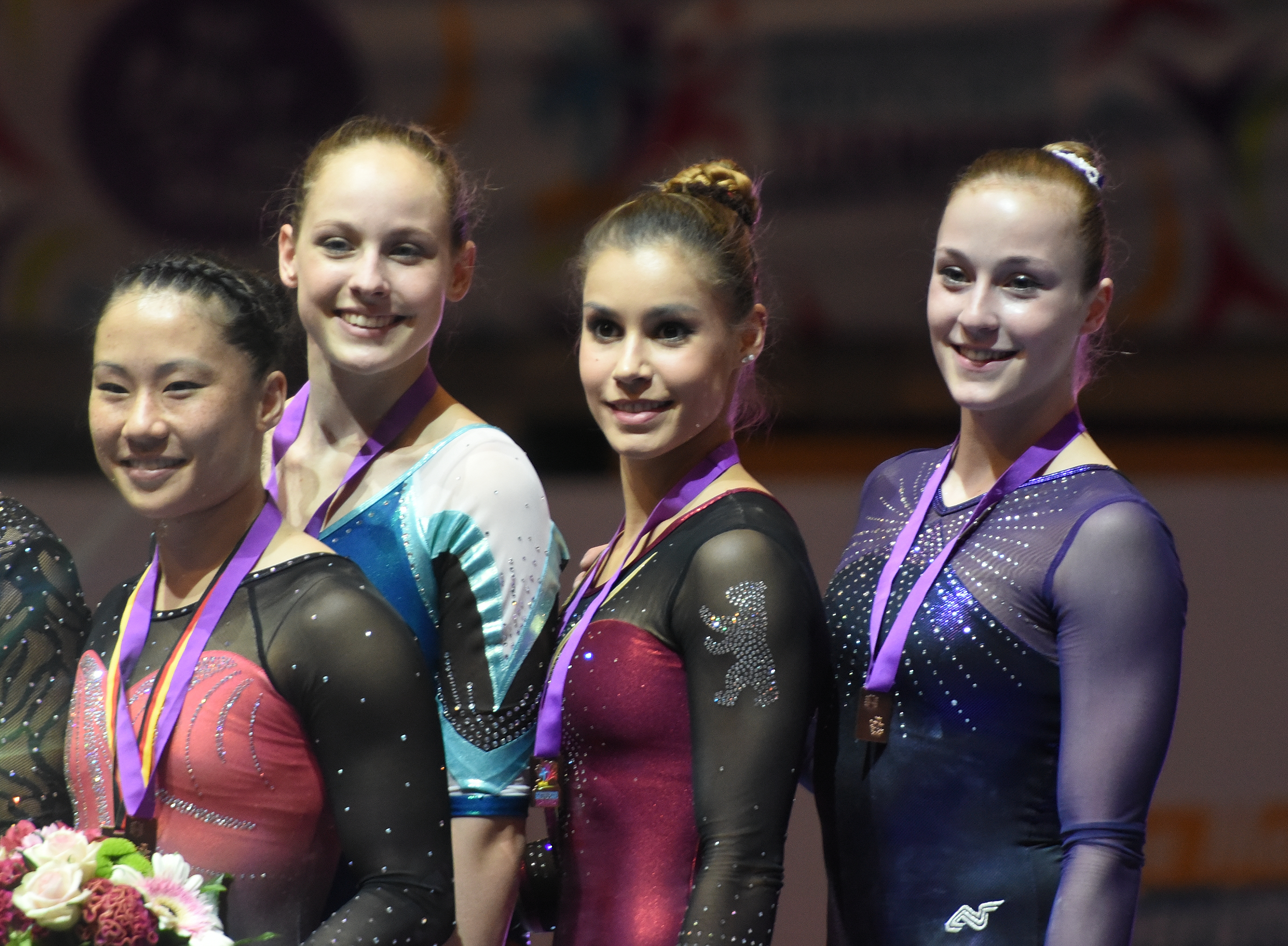
Voss (second from the left) at the 2017 German Championships

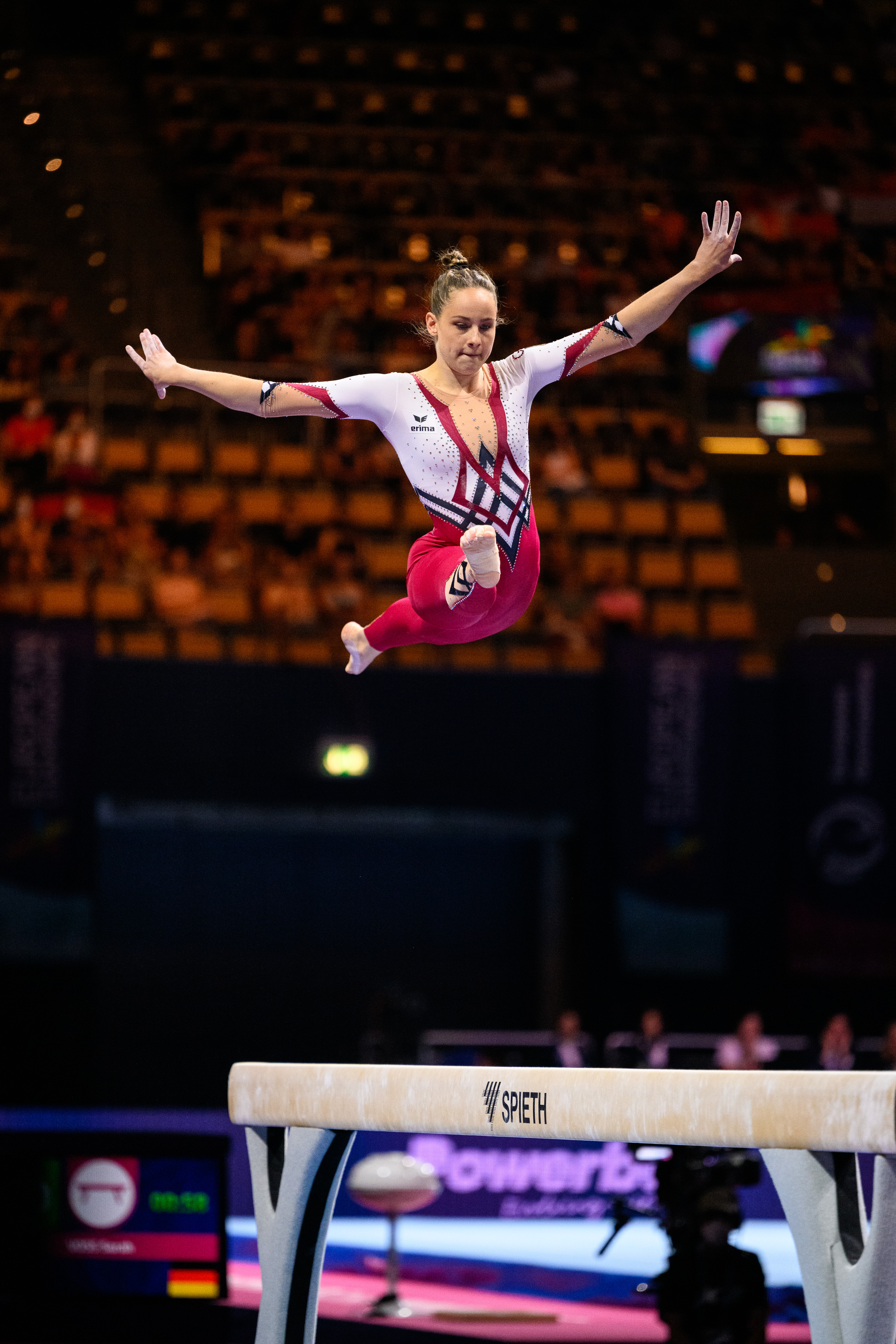
Voss at the 2022 European Championships

Competitive history of Sarah Voss
Year	Event	Team	AA	VT	UB	BB	FX
2015	German Championships		6		5		6
2015	German World Team Trials		6				
2015	Länderkampf Kunstturnen	2nd place, silver medalist(s)					
2015	Toyota International Cup			11	6	12	8
2016	DTB Pokal Team Challenge	2nd place, silver medalist(s)	12				
2016	Doha Challenge Cup						7
2016	Belgium Friendly	3rd place, bronze medalist(s)	12				
2016	European Championships	7					
2016	German Championships		7				
2016	German Olympic Trials		6				
2017	DTB Pokal Team Challenge	4					
2017	FinGym Turku					2nd place, silver medalist(s)	1st place, gold medalist(s)
2017	German Championships		5			4	
2017	German World Trials		5				
2017	Paris Challenge Cup			5		7	
2017	Toyota International Cup		2nd place, silver medalist(s)		8	8	3rd place, bronze medalist(s)
2018	Stuttgart World Cup		5				
2018	Birmingham World Cup		8				
2018	German Euro Trials		2nd place, silver medalist(s)				
2018	Sainté Gym Cup	2nd place, silver medalist(s)					
2018	European Championships	R2		4			
2018	German World Trials		3rd place, bronze medalist(s)				
2018	German Championships		6	1st place, gold medalist(s)		1st place, gold medalist(s)	
2018	Rüsselsheim Friendly	1st place, gold medalist(s)	5				
2018	World Championships	8					
2019	German Championships		1st place, gold medalist(s)	1st place, gold medalist(s)		1st place, gold medalist(s)	5
2019	Worms Friendly	1st place, gold medalist(s)					
2019	World Championships	R1	10			7	
2019	Arthur Gander Memorial		2nd place, silver medalist(s)				
2020	American Cup		11				
2021
2021	European Championships			R1			
2021	German Championships		3rd place, bronze medalist(s)	1st place, gold medalist(s)	6	1st place, gold medalist(s)	2nd place, silver medalist(s)
2021	FIT Challenge	6	14				
2021	Olympic Games	R1					
2022	DTB Pokal Mixed Cup	2nd place, silver medalist(s)					
2022	Baku World Cup				4	1st place, gold medalist(s)	
2022	Osijek Challenge Cup				2nd place, silver medalist(s)		4
2022	German Championships		1st place, gold medalist(s)	1st place, gold medalist(s)	4	2nd place, silver medalist(s)	2nd place, silver medalist(s)
2022	European Championships	3rd place, bronze medalist(s)					
2023	DTB Pokal Mixed Cup	2nd place, silver medalist(s)					
2023	European Championships	9	16				
2023	Heidelberg Friendly	1st place, gold medalist(s)	2nd place, silver medalist(s)				
2023	World Championships	13	22				
2024	German Championships		2nd place, silver medalist(s)			1st place, gold medalist(s)	
2024	Olympic Games		24				
