= Aleksandra Andrianova =

Russian artistic gymnast

- Александра Андрианова
- Full name: Aleksandra Sergeevna Andrianova
- Born: 2012 (age 13–14) Vladimir, Russia
- Relatives: Nikolai Andrianov (grandfather); Lyubov Burda (grandmother)

Gymnastics career
- Discipline: Women's artistic gymnastics
- Country represented: Russia (2024–present)
Medal record
Representing Russia
Junior European Championships
Gold medal – first place	2026 Zagreb	Team
Gold medal – first place	2026 Zagreb	All-around
Silver medal – second place	2026 Zagreb	Uneven bars
Silver medal – second place	2026 Zagreb	Floor exercise

Aleksandra Sergeevna Andrianova (Russian: Александра Сергеевна Андрианова; born 2012) is a Russian artistic gymnast. She is the 2026 Junior European Champion.

== Early life ==
Adnrianova was born in Vladimir, Russia in 2012. She is the granddaughter of Olympic champions Nikolai Andrianov and Lyubov Burda.

== Gymnastics career ==
Andrianova competed at the 2026 Junior European Championships where she helped Russia win team gold (under the banner of World Gymnastics 2). Individually she won gold in the all-around. During event finals she won silver on uneven bars and floor exercise and finished fifth on balance beam.
