= World Artistic Gymnastics Championships – Men's pommel horse =

The men's pommel horse competition was an inaugural event at the World Artistic Gymnastics Championships. It was not held in 1909.

Three medals are awarded: gold for first place, silver for second place, and bronze for third place. Tie breakers have not been used in every year. In the event of a tie between two gymnasts, both names are listed, and the following position (second for a tie for first, third for a tie for second) is left empty because a medal was not awarded for that position. If three gymnastics tied for a position, the following two positions are left empty.

== Medalists ==
Bold numbers in brackets denotes record number of victories.

Year	Location	Gold	Silver	Bronze
1903	(Belgium) Antwerp	(France) Georges Dejagere (France) Joseph Lux (Netherlands) Hendricus Thijsen	—N/a	—N/a
1905	(France) Bordeaux	(France) Georges Dejagere	(France) Marcel Lalu	(France) Daniel Lavielle
1907	(Austria-Hungary) Prague	(Bohemia) František Erben	(France) Jules Rolland	(Bohemia) Karel Sal
1909	Luxembourg	No pommel horse event held		
1911	(Italy) Turin	(Italy) Osvaldo Palazzi	(Italy) Paolo Salvi (Italy) Giorgio Zampori	—N/a
1913	(France) Paris	(Italy) Giorgio Zampori	(France) N. Aubry (Italy) Osvaldo Palazzi (France) Marco Torrès	—N/a
1915–1917	Not held due to World War I			
1922	(Kingdom of Yugoslavia) Ljubljana	(Czechoslovakia) Miroslav Klinger	(Czechoslovakia) Stanislav Indruch (Kingdom of Yugoslavia) Leon Štukelj (Kingdom of Yugoslavia) Peter Šumi	—N/a
1926	(France) Lyon	(Czechoslovakia) Jan Karafiát	(Czechoslovakia) Jan Gajdoš	(Czechoslovakia) Ladislav Vácha
1930	Luxembourg	(Kingdom of Yugoslavia) Josip Primožič	(Kingdom of Yugoslavia) Peter Šumi	(Czechoslovakia) Jan Gajdoš
1934	(Hungary) Budapest	(Switzerland) Eugen Mack	(Switzerland) Eduard Steinemann	(Czechoslovakia) Jan Sladek
1938	(Czechoslovakia) Prague	(Switzerland) Michael Reusch	(Czechoslovakia) Vratislav Petráček	(Switzerland) Leo Schürmann
1942	Not held due to World War II			
1950	(Switzerland) Basel	(Switzerland) Josef Stalder	(Switzerland) Marcel Adatte	(Switzerland) Walter Lehmann
1954	(Italy) Rome	(Soviet Union) Hrant Shahinyan	(Switzerland) Josef Stalder	(Soviet Union) Viktor Chukarin
1958	(Soviet Union) Moscow	(Soviet Union) Boris Shakhlin	(Soviet Union) Pavel Stolbov	(Socialist Federal Republic of Yugoslavia) Miroslav Cerar
1962	(Czechoslovakia) Prague	(Socialist Federal Republic of Yugoslavia) Miroslav Cerar	(Soviet Union) Boris Shakhlin	(Japan) Takashi Mitsukuri (China) Yu Lifeng
1966	(West Germany) Dortmund	(Socialist Federal Republic of Yugoslavia) Miroslav Cerar	(Soviet Union) Mikhail Voronin	(Japan) Takeshi Katō
1970	(Socialist Federal Republic of Yugoslavia) Ljubljana	(Socialist Federal Republic of Yugoslavia) Miroslav Cerar (3)	(Japan) Eizō Kenmotsu	(Soviet Union) Viktor Klimenko
1974	(Bulgaria) Varna	(Hungary) Zoltán Magyar	(Soviet Union) Nikolai Andrianov	(Japan) Eizō Kenmotsu
1978	(France) Strasbourg	(Hungary) Zoltán Magyar	(West Germany) Eberhard Gienger	(Bulgaria) Stoyan Deltchev
1979	(United States) Fort Worth	(Hungary) Zoltán Magyar (3)	(United States) Kurt Thomas	(Japan) Kōji Gushiken
1981	(Soviet Union) Moscow	(China) Li Xiaoping (East Germany) Michael Nikolay	—N/a	(Hungary) György Guczoghy (Soviet Union) Yuri Korolyov
1983	(Hungary) Budapest	(Soviet Union) Dmitry Bilozerchev	(Hungary) György Guczoghy (China) Li Xiaoping	—N/a
1985	(Canada) Montreal	(Soviet Union) Valentin Mogilny	(China) Li Ning	(Japan) Hiroyuki Konishi
1987	(Netherlands) Rotterdam	(Soviet Union) Dmitry Bilozerchev (Hungary) Zsolt Borkai	—N/a	(Bulgaria) Lubomir Geraskov
1989	(West Germany) Stuttgart	(Soviet Union) Valentin Mogilny	(East Germany) Andreas Wecker	(China) Li Jing
1991	(United States) Indianapolis	(Soviet Union) Valery Belenky	(China) Guo Linyao	(China) Li Jing
1992	(France) Paris	(China) Li Jing (North Korea) Pae Gil-su (Commonwealth of Independent States) Vitaly Scherbo	—N/a	—N/a
1993	(United Kingdom) Birmingham	(North Korea) Pae Gil-su	(Germany) Andreas Wecker	(Hungary) Károly Schupkégel
1994	(Australia) Brisbane	(Romania) Marius Urzică	(France) Éric Poujade	(Switzerland) Li Donghua (Ukraine) Vitaly Marinich
1995	(Japan) Sabae	(Switzerland) Li Donghua	(Japan) Yoshiaki Hatakeda (China) Huang Huadong	—N/a
1996	(Puerto Rico) San Juan	(North Korea) Pae Gil-su (3)	(Switzerland) Li Donghua	(Russia) Alexei Nemov
1997	(Switzerland) Lausanne	(Germany) Valery Belenky	(France) Éric Poujade	(North Korea) Pae Gil-su
1999	(China) Tianjin	(Russia) Alexei Nemov	(Romania) Marius Urzică	(Russia) Nikolai Kryukov
2001	(Belgium) Ghent	(Romania) Marius Urzică	(China) Xiao Qin	(Ukraine) Oleksandr Beresch
2002	(Hungary) Debrecen	(Romania) Marius Urzică (3)	(China) Xiao Qin	(Japan) Takehiro Kashima
2003	(United States) Anaheim	(Japan) Takehiro Kashima (China) Teng Haibin	—N/a	(Russia) Nikolai Kryukov
2005	(Australia) Melbourne	(China) Xiao Qin	(Romania) Ioan Silviu Suciu	(Japan) Takehiro Kashima
2006	(Denmark) Aarhus	(China) Xiao Qin	(Australia) Prashanth Sellathurai	(United States) Alexander Artemev
2007	(Germany) Stuttgart	(China) Xiao Qin (3)	(Hungary) Krisztián Berki	(United Kingdom) Louis Smith
2009	(United Kingdom) London	(China) Zhang Hongtao	(Hungary) Krisztián Berki	(Australia) Prashanth Sellathurai
2010	(Netherlands) Rotterdam	(Hungary) Krisztián Berki	(United Kingdom) Louis Smith	(Australia) Prashanth Sellathurai
2011	(Japan) Tokyo	(Hungary) Krisztián Berki	(France) Cyril Tommasone	(United Kingdom) Louis Smith
2013	(Belgium) Antwerp	(Japan) Kohei Kameyama	(Mexico) Daniel Corral (United Kingdom) Max Whitlock	—N/a
2014	(China) Nanning	(Hungary) Krisztián Berki (3)	(Croatia) Filip Ude	(France) Cyril Tommasone
2015	(United Kingdom) Glasgow	(United Kingdom) Max Whitlock	(United Kingdom) Louis Smith	(Japan) Kazuma Kaya (Armenia) Harutyun Merdinyan
2017	(Canada) Montreal	(United Kingdom) Max Whitlock	(Russia) David Belyavskiy	(China) Xiao Ruoteng
2018	(Qatar) Doha	(China) Xiao Ruoteng	(United Kingdom) Max Whitlock	(Chinese Taipei) Lee Chih-kai
2019	(Germany) Stuttgart	(United Kingdom) Max Whitlock (3)	(Chinese Taipei) Lee Chih-kai	(Republic of Ireland) Rhys McClenaghan
2021	(Japan) Kitakyushu	(United States) Stephen Nedoroscik	(Japan) Kazuma Kaya (China) Weng Hao	—N/a
2022	(United Kingdom) Liverpool	(Republic of Ireland) Rhys McClenaghan	(Jordan) Ahmad Abu Al-Soud	(Armenia) Harutyun Merdinyan
2023	(Belgium) Antwerp	(Republic of Ireland) Rhys McClenaghan	(United States) Khoi Young	(Jordan) Ahmad Abu Al-Soud
2025	(Indonesia) Jakarta	(China) Hong Yanming	(Armenia) Mamikon Khachatryan	(United States) Patrick Hoopes
2026	(Netherlands) Rotterdam	(Armenia) Hamlet Manukyan	(Italy) Gabriele Targhetta	(Armenia) Mamikon Khachatryan

== All-time medal count ==
Last updated after the 2026 World Championships.

Rank	Nation	Gold	Silver	Bronze	Total
1	China	9	7	4	20
2	Soviet Union	7	4	3	14
3	Hungary	7	3	2	12
4	Switzerland	4	4	3	11
5	Yugoslavia	4	3	1	8
6	France	3	7	2	12
7	Great Britain	3	4	2	9
8	Romania	3	2	0	5
9	North Korea	3	0	1	4
10	Italy	2	4	0	6
11	Japan	2	3	8	13
12	Czechoslovakia	2	3	3	8
13	Ireland	2	0	1	3
14	United States	1	2	2	5
15	Armenia	1	1	3	5
15	Russia	1	1	3	5
17	East Germany	1	1	0	2
17	Germany	1	1	0	2
19	Bohemia ^{[a]}	1	0	1	2
20	CIS ^{[b]}	1	0	0	1
20	Netherlands	1	0	0	1
22	Australia	0	1	2	3
23	Chinese Taipei	0	1	1	2
23	Jordan	0	1	1	2
25	Croatia	0	1	0	1
25	Mexico	0	1	0	1
25	West Germany	0	1	0	1
28	Bulgaria	0	0	2	2
28	Ukraine	0	0	2	2
Totals (29 entries)		59	56	47	162

Notes

- ^[a] Official FIG documents credit medals earned by athletes from Bohemia as medals for Czechoslovakia.
- ^[b] Official FIG documents credit medals earned by athletes from former Soviet Union at the 1992 World Artistic Gymnastics Championships in Paris, France, as medals for CIS (Commonwealth of Independent States).

== Multiple medalists ==
Rank	Gymnast	Nation	Years	Gold	Silver	Bronze	Total
1	Krisztián Berki	Hungary	2007–2014	3	2	0	5
1	Max Whitlock	Great Britain	2013–2019	3	2	0	5
1	Xiao Qin	China	2001–2007	3	2	0	5
4	Marius Urzică	Romania	1994–2002	3	1	0	4
5	Miroslav Cerar	Yugoslavia	1958–1970	3	0	1	4
5	Pae Gil-su	North Korea	1992–1997	3	0	1	4
7	Zoltán Magyar	Hungary	1974–1979	3	0	0	3
8	Rhys McClenaghan	Ireland	2019–2023	2	0	1	3
9	Valery Belenky	Soviet Union; Germany	1991–1997	2	0	0	2
9	Dmitry Bilozerchev	Soviet Union	1983–1987	2	0	0	2
9	Georges Dejagere	France	1903–1905	2	0	0	2
9	Valentin Mogilny	Soviet Union	1985–1989	2	0	0	2
13	Li Donghua	Switzerland	1994–1996	1	1	1	3
14	Li Xiaoping	China	1981–1983	1	1	0	2
14	Osvaldo Palazzi	Italy	1911–1913	1	1	0	2
14	Boris Shakhlin	Soviet Union	1958–1962	1	1	0	2
14	Josef Stalder	Switzerland	1950–1954	1	1	0	2
14	Giorgio Zampori	Italy	1911–1913	1	1	0	2
19	Takehiro Kashima	Japan	2002–2005	1	0	2	3
19	Li Jing	China	1989–1992	1	0	2	3
21	Alexei Nemov	Russia	1996–1999	1	0	1	2
21	Xiao Ruoteng	China	2017–2018	1	0	1	2
23	Louis Smith	Great Britain	2007–2015	0	2	2	4
24	Éric Poujade	France	1994–1997	0	2	0	2
24	Peter Šumi	Yugoslavia	1922–1930	0	2	0	2
24	Andreas Wecker	East Germany; Germany	1989–1993	0	2	0	2
27	Prashanth Sellathurai	Australia	2007–2015	0	1	2	3
28	Ahmad Abu Al-Soud	Jordan	2022–2023	0	1	1	2
28	Jan Gajdoš	Czechoslovakia	1926–1930	0	1	1	2
28	György Guczoghy	Hungary	1981–1983	0	1	1	2
28	Kazuma Kaya	Japan	2015–2021	0	1	1	2
28	Eizō Kenmotsu	Japan	1970–1974	0	1	1	2
28	Mamikon Khachatryan	Armenia	2025–2026	0	1	1	2
28	Lee Chih-kai	Chinese Taipei	2018–2019	0	1	1	2
28	Cyril Tommasone	France	2011–2014	0	1	1	2
36	Nikolai Kryukov	Russia	1999–2003	0	0	2	2
36	Harutyun Merdinyan	Armenia	2015–2022	0	0	2	2
