= Armenia at the World Artistic Gymnastics Championships =

- Flag of Armenia
- IOC code: ARM
- Medals: Gold 3 Silver 2 Bronze 4 Total 9

Armenian gymnasts first competed at the 1993 World Championships, after the fall of the Soviet Union. It wasn't until 2015 when an Armenian gymnast, Harutyun Merdinyan, won an independent Armenia its first medal. At the 2022 World Championships, Artur Davtyan won the first gold medal for Armenia. At the 2026 World Championships, four separate Armenian gymnasts all won medals, with two winning World titles.

== Medalists ==
Medal	Name	Year	Event
Bronze	Harutyun Merdinyan	(United Kingdom) 2015 Glasgow	Men's pommel horse
Bronze	Harutyun Merdinyan	(United Kingdom) 2022 Liverpool	Men's pommel horse
Gold	Artur Davtyan	(United Kingdom) 2022 Liverpool	Men's vault
Silver	Mamikon Khachatryan	(Indonesia) 2025 Jakarta	Men's pommel horse
Silver	Artur Davtyan	(Indonesia) 2025 Jakarta	Men's vault
Gold	Hamlet Manukyan	(Netherlands) 2026 Rotterdam	Men's pommel horse
Bronze	Mamikon Khachatryan	(Netherlands) 2026 Rotterdam	Men's pommel horse
Bronze	Artur Avetisyan	(Netherlands) 2026 Rotterdam	Men's rings
Gold	Artur Davtyan	(Netherlands) 2026 Rotterdam	Men's vault

== Junior World medalists ==
Medal	Name	Year	Event
Gold	Hamlet Manukyan	(Turkey) 2023 Antalya	Boys' pommel horse
Silver	Mamikon Khachatryan	(Turkey) 2023 Antalya	Boys' pommel horse
Gold	Hamlet Manukyan	(Turkey) 2023 Antalya	Boys' rings
