= Patrick Hoopes =

American artistic gymnast

- Hoopes competing for the Air Force Falcons in February 2025

Personal information
- Full name: Patrick Walker Hoopes
- Born: May 15, 2002 (age 24)
- Height: 5 ft 10 in (178 cm)

Gymnastics career
- Discipline: Men's artistic gymnastics
- Country represented: United States; (2024–present)
- College team: Air Force Falcons (2022–2025)
- Gym: USA Gymnastics World
- Head coach: Josh Loeser
Medal record
Men's artistic gymnastics
Representing United States
World Championships
Bronze medal – third place	2025 Jakarta	Pommel horse
Pan American Championships
Gold medal – first place	2026 Rio de Janeiro	Pommel horse
Bronze medal – third place	2026 Rio de Janeiro	Team
World University Games
Bronze medal – third place	2025 Rhine-Ruhr	Pommel horse
Event / 1st / 2nd / 3rd; World Cup / 0 / 1 / 1

Patrick Walker Hoopes (born May 15, 2002) is an American artistic gymnast who specializes in the pommel horse. He has been a member of the United States men's national artistic gymnastics team since 2024. He is the 2025 World bronze medalist, 2026 Pan American champion, and 2025 World University Games bronze medalist on pommel horse.

== Early life and education ==
Hoopes was born on May 15, 2002, to Phil Hoopes and Patricia Moody Hoopes. His hometown is Lehi, Utah, and he attended Skyridge High School, graduating in 2020. He later enrolled at the United States Air Force Academy to pursue gymnastics. He graduated from the United States Air Force Academy on May 29, 2025.

== Gymnastics career ==
=== 2023 ===
Hoopes placed 4th on pommel horse at the 2023 U.S. National Gymnastics Championships.

=== 2024 ===
Hoopes competed at the 2024 Winter Cup, where he won gold on the pommel horse. This performance led to his selection for the Baku World Cup. At this competition, he made his international debut and placed 6th on pommel horse.

In April, he competed at the NCAA Championships and became the NCAA champion on pommel horse.

At the U.S. National Championships, he won silver on the pommel horse, behind Stephen Nedoroscik. As a result, he was selected to the senior national team for the second time and qualified for the 2024 Olympic Trials. At the Olympic Trials, he won gold on pommel horse and was selected as a non-traveling reserve for the 2024 Summer Olympics.

=== 2025 ===
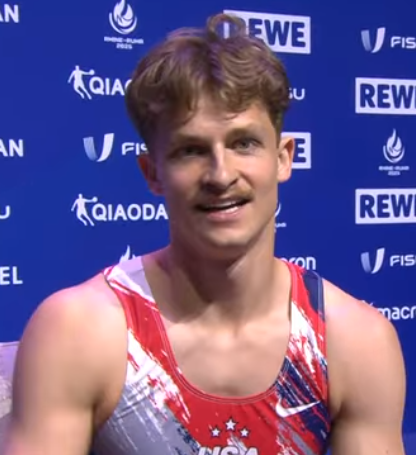
Hoopes at the 2025 World University Games

Hoopes competed at the 2025 Winter Cup where he placed second on pommel horse behind Brandon Dang. He competed at numerous World Cups in early 2025, winning silver in Baku behind Dang, placing fourth in Antalya, and winning bronze in Cairo behind Hamlet Manukyan and Gabriele Targhetta.

At the NCAA Championships, he successfully defended his title on pommel horse. Hoopes was selected to represent the United States at the World University Games alongside Colt Walker, Tate Costa, Alex Nitache, and Kai Uemura. While there he won bronze on pommel horse behind Manukyan and Daiki Hashimoto. In August, Hoopes competed at the National Championships where he won his first national title on pommel horse. After the competition, he was selected to compete at the 2025 World Championships alongside Dang, Asher Hong, Brody Malone, Kameron Nelson, and Donnell Whittenburg. He hoped to upgrade his dismount ahead of World Championships which would give him one of the highest difficulty scores in the world on the pommel horse.

At the World Championships, Hoopes qualified for the pommel horse final in third place behind Nariman Kurbanov and Hong Yanming. During the event final Hoopes won the bronze medal behind Hong and Mamikon Khachatryan.

=== 2026 ===
Hoopes after medaling at the 2026 U.S. National Gymnastics Championships

On May 11, 2026, he was selected to represent the United States at the 2026 Pan American Championships. At the competition he helped the USA win bronze as a team and individually he qualified to the pommel horse event final where he won gold.

At the 2026 U.S. National Championships, Hoopes won his second national pommel horse title. At the conclusion of the competition, he was selected to compete at the 2026 World Championships alongside Shane Wiskus, Danila Leykin, Fred Richard, Kameron Nelson, and alternate Yul Moldauer.

== Competitive history ==
Competitive history of Patrick Hoopes
Year	Event	Team	AA	FX	PH	SR	VT	PB	HB
2022	U.S. National Championships				8				
2023	Winter Cup				5				
2023	NCAA Championships				7				
2023	U.S. Classic				3rd place, bronze medalist(s)				
2023	U.S. National Championships				4				
2024	Winter Cup				1st place, gold medalist(s)				
2024	Baku World Cup				6				
2024	NCAA Championships				1st place, gold medalist(s)				
2024	U.S. National Championships				2nd place, silver medalist(s)				
2024	Olympic Trials				1st place, gold medalist(s)				
2025	Winter Cup				2nd place, silver medalist(s)				
2025	Baku World Cup				2nd place, silver medalist(s)				
2025	Antalya World Cup				4				
2025	NCAA Championships				1st place, gold medalist(s)				
2025	Cairo World Cup				3rd place, bronze medalist(s)				
2025	World University Games	8			3rd place, bronze medalist(s)				
2025	U.S. National Championships				1st place, gold medalist(s)				
2025	World Championships	—N/a			3rd place, bronze medalist(s)				
2026	Cottbus World Cup				R1				
2026	Pan American Championships	3rd place, bronze medalist(s)			1st place, gold medalist(s)				
2026	U.S. National Championships				1st place, gold medalist(s)				
2026	World Championships	6			5				
