= Centazzo =

Centazzo is an Italian surname. Notable people with the surname include:

- Andrea Centazzo (born 1948), Italian-born American composer, percussionist, multimedia artist, and record label founder
- Gianmatteo Centazzo (born 1970), Italian gymnast
