= 2026 European Men's Artistic Gymnastics Championships =

- Venue: Arena Zagreb
- Location: Zagreb, Croatia
- Start date: 19 August 2026
- End date: 23 August 2026

The 37th European Men's Artistic Gymnastics Championships was held in Arena Zagreb in Zagreb, Croatia from 19 to 23 August 2026. The organizer was the Croatian Gymnastics Federation, supported by the Government of Croatia and City of Zagreb. This was the first time that Croatia has hosted the European Championships in artistic gymnastics.

Marios Georgiou of Cyprus was awarded the Shooting Star Award.

== Schedule ==
Date	Session	Time	Subdivisions
Wednesday, 19 August
Wednesday, 19 August	Senior All-Around Final and Qualification for Team & Individual Apparatus Finals	10:00 – 13:30	Subdivision 1
Wednesday, 19 August	Senior All-Around Final and Qualification for Team & Individual Apparatus Finals	14:00 – 17:30	Subdivision 2
Wednesday, 19 August	Senior All-Around Final and Qualification for Team & Individual Apparatus Finals	17:45 – 21:45	Subdivision 3
Thursday, 20 August	Junior Team Finals and Qualification for Individual All-Around & Apparatus Finals	10:00 – 12:50	Subdivision 1
Thursday, 20 August	Junior Team Finals and Qualification for Individual All-Around & Apparatus Finals	14:00 – 16:50	Subdivision 2
Thursday, 20 August	Junior Team Finals and Qualification for Individual All-Around & Apparatus Finals	17:30 – 20:50	Subdivision 3
Friday, 21 August	Senior Individual Apparatus Finals	18:00 – 20:30	Floor, Pommel horse, Rings; Vault, Parallel bars, Horizontal bar
Saturday, 22 August	Junior Individual Apparatus Finals	10:00 – 12:45	Floor, Pommel horse, Rings; Vault, Parallel bars, Horizontal bar
Saturday, 22 August	Senior Individual Apparatus Finals	16:30 – 19:00	Floor, Pommel horse, Rings; Vault, Parallel bars, Horizontal bar
Sunday, 23 August	Junior All-Around Final	10:00 – 12:15	Top 24 from qualifications
Sunday, 23 August	Senior Team Final	14:00 – 17:00	Top 8 from qualifications
All times listed in local time (UTC+01:00).

== Medals summary ==
=== Medalists ===
Event	Gold	Silver	Bronze
Senior
Team	(United Kingdom) Great Britain; Joe Fraser; Harry Hepworth; Sol Scott; Jonas Rushworth; Courtney Tulloch	World Gymnastics 2 Arsenii Dukhno; Mukhammadzhon Iakubov; Daniel Marinov; Savelii Sieedin; Ilia Zaika	Switzerland; Matteo Giubellini; Florian Langenegger; Mattia Piffaretti; Noe Seifert; Dominic Tamsel
All-around	(Croatia) Illia Kovtun	Arsenii Dukhno	Daniel Marinov
Floor	(Israel) Artem Dolgopyat	Arsenii Dukhno	(United Kingdom) Harry Hepworth
Pommel horse	(Italy) Gabriele Targhetta	(Armenia) Hamlet Manukyan	(Armenia) Mamikon Khachatryan
Rings	(Armenia) Artur Avetisyan	Ilia Zaika	(Greece) Eleftherios Petrounias
Vault	(Ukraine) Nazar Chepurnyi	Aleksei Usachev	(United Kingdom) Sol Scott
Parallel bars	(Croatia) Illia Kovtun	(Turkey) Ferhat Arıcan	(United Kingdom) Joe Fraser
Horizontal bar	(United Kingdom) Joe Fraser	(Cyprus) Marios Georgiou	Savelii Sieedin
Junior
Team	(United Kingdom) Great Britain; George Atkins; Uzair Chowdhury; Zakaine Fawzi-McCaffrey; Evan McPhillips; Ellis Niles	World Gymnastics 2 Radmir Musaev; Ilia Musin; Daniil Smirnov; Dmitrii Sukhodolskii; Aleksandr Vasilev	Italy; Paolo Giglio; Pietro Mazzola; Gabriele Pasanisi; Ivan Rigon; Riccardo Ruggeri
All-around	Daniil Smirnov	(Ukraine) Volodymyr Golovin	Radmir Musaev
Floor	(Italy) Riccardo Ruggeri	(Italy) Pietro Mazzola	(Ukraine) Volodymyr Golovin
Pommel horse	(Ukraine) Volodymyr Golovin	Radmir Musaev (United Kingdom) Zakaine Fawzi-McCaffrey	Not awarded
Rings	Radmir Musaev	(Italy) Riccardo Ruggeri	(Spain) David Martínez
Vault	(Ukraine) Valentyn Havrylchenko	(Austria) Samuel Wachter	(Switzerland) Ben Schumacher
Parallel bars	(United Kingdom) Uzair Chowdhury	(Ukraine) Volodymyr Golovin	(United Kingdom) George Atkins
Horizontal bar	(Italy) Ivan Rigon (Netherlands) Sami Soleban	Not awarded	Daniil Smirnov

=== Medal standings ===
==== Overall ====
* Host nation (Croatia)

Rank	Nation	Gold	Silver	Bronze	Total
1	Great Britain	4	1	4	9
2	Italy	3	2	1	6
2	Ukraine	3	2	1	6
4	World Gymnastics 2 (Note: Russian athletes were not allowed to use their flag or national emblems. They competed as "World Gymnastics 2".)	2	7	4	13
5	Croatia*	2	0	0	2
6	Armenia	1	1	1	3
7	Israel	1	0	0	1
7	Netherlands	1	0	0	1
9	Austria	0	1	0	1
9	Cyprus	0	1	0	1
9	Turkey	0	1	0	1
12	Switzerland	0	0	2	2
13	Greece	0	0	1	1
13	Spain	0	0	1	1
Totals (14 entries)		17	16	15	48

==== Senior ====
* Host nation (Croatia)

Rank	Nation	Gold	Silver	Bronze	Total
1	Great Britain	2	0	3	5
2	Croatia*	2	0	0	2
3	Armenia	1	1	1	3
4	Israel	1	0	0	1
4	Italy	1	0	0	1
4	Ukraine	1	0	0	1
7	World Gymnastics 2	0	5	2	7
8	Cyprus	0	1	0	1
8	Turkey	0	1	0	1
10	Greece	0	0	1	1
10	Switzerland	0	0	1	1
Totals (11 entries)		8	8	8	24

==== Junior ====
* Host nation (Croatia)

Rank	Nation	Gold	Silver	Bronze	Total
1	World Gymnastics 2	2	2	2	6
2	Italy	2	2	1	5
2	Ukraine	2	2	1	5
4	Great Britain	2	1	1	4
5	Netherlands	1	0	0	1
6	Austria	0	1	0	1
7	Spain	0	0	1	1
7	Switzerland	0	0	1	1
Totals (8 entries)		9	8	7	24

== Senior results ==
=== Team ===
Rank	Team	Floor (gymnastics)	Pommel horse	Rings (gymnastics)	Vault (gymnastics)	Parallel bars	Horizontal bar	Total
1st place, gold medalist(s)	Great Britain	40.532	40.966	42.766	42.933	39.399	40.132	246.728
1st place, gold medalist(s)	Joe Fraser	13.066	14.066	13.900		14.200	13.300	246.728
1st place, gold medalist(s)	Harry Hepworth	14.300		14.566	14.533			246.728
1st place, gold medalist(s)	Jonas Rushworth		13.600			13.333	13.166	246.728
1st place, gold medalist(s)	Sol Scott	13.166	13.300		14.300		13.666	246.728
1st place, gold medalist(s)	Courtney Tulloch			14.300	14.100	11.866		246.728
2nd place, silver medalist(s)	World Gymnastics 2	42.432	39.698	39.865	41.466	42.198	40.498	246.158
2nd place, silver medalist(s)	Arsenii Dukhno	14.466	13.966		14.300	14.166	13.533	246.158
2nd place, silver medalist(s)	Mukhammadzhon Iakubov	14.166		12.566	12.700			246.158
2nd place, silver medalist(s)	Daniel Marinov	13.800	13.666	12.866	14.466	14.066	13.133	246.158
2nd place, silver medalist(s)	Savelii Sleedin		12.066			13.966	13.833	246.158
2nd place, silver medalist(s)	Ilia Zaika			14.433				246.158
3rd place, bronze medalist(s)	Switzerland	40.565	41.166	38.998	41.732	39.500	40.132	242.094
3rd place, bronze medalist(s)	Matteo Giubellini		14.000	12.866				242.094
3rd place, bronze medalist(s)	Florian Langenegger	13.866	13.433		14.066	13.800	13.266	242.094
3rd place, bronze medalist(s)	Mattia Piffaretti	13.233		13.200	13.700	11.800		242.094
3rd place, bronze medalist(s)	Noe Seifert	13.466		12.933	13.966	13.900	13.666	242.094
3rd place, bronze medalist(s)	Dominic Tamsel		13.733				13.200	242.094
4	Italy	40.832	40.466	39.066	41.733	38.132	40.265	240.494
4	Yumin Abbadini	13.766	13.300			13.066	13.833	240.494
4	Edoardo de Rosa		13.633			12.700		240.494
4	Ares Federici	13.633		12.500	13.733	12.366	12.966	240.494
4	Simone Speranza	13.433		13.566	14.000			240.494
4	Riccardo Villa		13.533	13.000	14.000		13.466	240.494
5	Germany	40.699	40.665	37.833	41.566	40.965	38.432	240.160
5	Timo Eder	13.633	13.633		13.700	13.733	13.466	240.160
5	Gabriel Eichhorn			12.200		13.366	12.000	240.160
5	Lucas Kochan	13.533	13.266		13.733			240.160
5	Alexander Kuntz			13.000				240.160
5	Radomyr Stelmakh	13.533	13.766	12.633	14.133	13.866	12.966	240.160
6	France	40.066	39.132	39.199	41.166	39.499	39.299	238.362
6	Kevin Carvalho				13.700	13.700	14.200	238.362
6	Pierre Cassam Chenai	12.833		12.566		13.266		238.362
6	Nael Sakouhi	13.733	13.500	12.933	13.900	12.533	13.366	238.362
6	Melwin Touchais		12.200	13.700				238.362
6	Leeroy Traore-Malatre	13.500	13.433		13.566		11.733	238.362
7	Belgium	39.199	39.933	38.498	40.766	38.732	38.399	235.528
7	Nicola Cuyle		13.200	13.133	12.666	12.266		235.528
7	Noah Kuavita	13.100			14.100	13.500	13.600	235.528
7	Victor Martinez	13.066		13.000	14.000	12.966	11.533	235.528
7	Senne Spyckerelle	13.033	12.433	12.366				235.528
7	Kilan van der Aa		14.300				13.266	235.528
8	Hungary	39.633	34.566	39.200	41.100	40.632	37.666	232.830
8	Tas Hajdu			13.600	13.700	13.566		232.830
8	Krisztofer Mészáros	13.433	10.366	12.800		13.933	13.300	232.830
8	Botond Molnár							232.830
8	Benedek Tomcsányi	13.300	12.900	12.800	13.700	13.133	11.200	232.830
8	Szilárd Závory	12.900	11.300		13.700		13.166	232.830

=== All-around ===
The qualification round served as the all-around competition, with no designated all-around final. Listed below are the results of the top 24 competitors, ranking two gymnasts per country.

Rank	Gymnast	Floor (gymnastics)	Pommel horse	Rings (gymnastics)	Vault (gymnastics)	Parallel bars	Horizontal bar	Total
1st place, gold medalist(s)	(Croatia) Illia Kovtun	14.100	12.800	13.333	13.900	14.500	14.200	82.833
2nd place, silver medalist(s)	Arsenii Dukhno	14.833	14.333	12.833	14.200	12.733	13.900	82.832
3rd place, bronze medalist(s)	Daniel Marinov	14.033	12.900	13.800	14.100	13.533	13.533	81.899
4	(Switzerland) Noe Seifert	13.200	13.966	12.633	13.500	13.933	13.966	81.198
5	(Finland) Robert Kirmes	13.200	13.900	13.233	13.433	13.433	13.800	80.999
6	(Cyprus) Marios Georgiou	12.900	13.733	13.000	13.266	13.933	14.100	80.932
7	(United Kingdom) Joe Fraser	11.033	13.700	13.700	13.900	14.366	14.200	80.899
8	(Germany) Radomyr Stelmakh	13.466	12.433	12.933	13.933	13.933	14.033	80.731
9	(Israel) Artem Dolgopyat	14.766	13.433	12.166	14.000	12.966	13.266	80.597
10	(Switzerland) Florian Langenegger	13.800	12.666	12.600	14.000	13.800	13.433	80.299
11	(Germany) Timo Eder	13.600	13.766	12.466	13.566	13.400	13.500	80.298
12	(France) Nael Sakouhi	13.266	13.333	13.300	13.700	13.066	13.566	80.231
13	(Hungary) Krisztofer Mészáros	13.700	13.533	13.100	13.500	14.333	11.966	80.132
14	(Italy) Yumin Abbadini	13.800	14.333	13.200	13.733	13.566	11.400	80.032
15	(Italy) Riccardo Villa	13.466	13.733	12.966	13.666	12.833	13.333	79.997
16	(Netherlands) Elijah Faverus	13.233	13.933	13.400	13.433	12.700	13.033	79.732
17	(Belgium) Victor Martinez	13.533	12.533	13.400	13.866	13.266	13.000	79.598
18	(Ukraine) Vladyslav Hryko	13.133	13.366	12.766	13.400	12.700	13.700	79.065
19	(United Kingdom) Jonas Rushworth	13.133	12.800	12.566	13.933	12.900	13.233	78.565
20	(Hungary) Benedek Tomcsányi	12.833	13.100	12.866	13.466	13.033	13.133	78.431
21	(Belgium) Senne Spyckerelle	13.466	13.366	12.333	13.300	13.133	12.533	78.131
22	(Ukraine) Mykyta Melnykov	13.266	13.733	12.266	13.233	12.133	13.400	78.031
23	(Norway) Peder Slogvang	13.700	12.433	12.233	13.433	12.900	13.233	77.932
24	(Spain) Nicolau Mir	13.600	12.766	12.400	13.533	12.733	12.800	77.832

Only two gymnasts from each country were allowed to be ranked in the all-around. The following gymnasts were impacted by this rule:

- Mukhammadzhon Iakubov (78.498)
- (Switzerland) Matteo Giubellini (78.365)
- (Italy) Ares Federici (78.332)

=== Floor exercise ===
Oldest and youngest competitors

	Name	Country	Date of birth	Age
Youngest	Arsenii Dukhno	WG2	5 August 2008	18 years and 16 days
Oldest	Artem Dolgopyat	Israel	16 June 1997	29 years, 2 months and 5 days

Rank	Gymnast	D Score	E Score	Pen.	Bon.	Total
1st place, gold medalist(s)	(Israel) Artem Dolgopyat	5.8	8.666	0.1	0.1	14.466
2nd place, silver medalist(s)	Arsenii Dukhno	5.9	8.433			14.333
3rd place, bronze medalist(s)	(United Kingdom) Harry Hepworth	6.1	8.200	0.1	0.1	14.300
4	(Croatia) Illia Kovtun	5.5	8.500		0.1	14.100
5	Yahor Sharamkou	5.8	8.266			14.066
6	(Switzerland) Luca Murabito	5.5	8.266			13.766
7	(Republic of Ireland) Eamon Montgomery	5.4	8.433	0.3		13.533
8	Mukhammadzhon Iakubov	5.5	7.533			13.033

=== Pommel horse ===
Oldest and youngest competitors

	Name	Country	Date of birth	Age
Youngest	Arsenii Dukhno	WG2	5 August 2008	18 years and 16 days
Oldest	Rhys McClenaghan	Ireland	21 July 1999	27 years and 1 month

Rank	Gymnast	D Score	E Score	Pen.	Total
1st place, gold medalist(s)	(Italy) Gabriele Targhetta	5.9	9.233		15.133
2nd place, silver medalist(s)	(Armenia) Hamlet Manukyan	5.7	9.300		15.000
3rd place, bronze medalist(s)	(Armenia) Mamikon Khachatryan	5.8	9.100		14.900
4	(Bulgaria) David Ivanov	6.0	8.700		14.700
5	(Spain) Ignacio Yockers	5.7	8.733		14.433
6	(Latvia) Dmitrijs Mickevičs	5.1	9.166		14.266
7	(Republic of Ireland) Rhys McClenaghan	5.7	8.466		14.166
8	Arsenii Dukhno	5.0	5.966		10.966

=== Rings ===
Oldest and youngest competitors

	Name	Country	Date of birth	Age
Youngest	Harry Hepworth	Great Britain	6 December 2003	22 years, 8 months and 15 days
Oldest	Vahagn Davtyan	Armenia	18 August 1988	38 years and 3 days

Rank	Gymnast	D Score	E Score	Pen.	Bon.	Total
1st place, gold medalist(s)	(Armenia) Artur Avetisyan	5.4	9.000			14.400
2nd place, silver medalist(s)	Ilia Zaika	5.7	8.700			14.400
3rd place, bronze medalist(s)	(Greece) Eleftherios Petrounias	5.6	8.766			14.366
4	(United Kingdom) Courtney Tulloch	5.7	8.666			14.366
5	(Armenia) Vahagn Davtyan	5.3	8.700			14.000
6	(Azerbaijan) Nikita Simonov	5.3	8.600		0.1	14.000
7	(Germany) Artur Sahakyan	5.3	8.600			13.900
8	(United Kingdom) Harry Hepworth	4.8	8.066			12.866

=== Vault ===
Oldest and youngest competitors

	Name	Country	Date of birth	Age
Youngest	Arsenii Dukhno	WG2	5 August 2008	18 years and 17 days
Oldest	Artur Davtyan	Armenia	8 August 1992	34 years and 14 days

Rank	Gymnast	Vault 1					Vault 2					Total
Rank	Gymnast	D Score	E Score	Pen.	Bon.	Score 1	D Score	E Score	Pen.	Bon.	Score 2	Total
1st place, gold medalist(s)	(Ukraine) Nazar Chepurnyi	5.2	9.433			14.633	5.2	9.300			14.500	14.566
2nd place, silver medalist(s)	Aleksei Usachev	5.2	9.233			14.433	5.2	9.166			14.366	14.399
3rd place, bronze medalist(s)	(United Kingdom) Sol Scott	5.2	9.033			14.233	4.8	9.366			14.166	14.199
4	(Norway) Sebastian Sponevik	5.2	8.900			14.100	5.2	8.900			14.100	14.100
5	(Bulgaria) Daniel Trifonov	4.8	9.100			13.900	4.8	9.400			14.200	14.050
6	(United Kingdom) Harry Hepworth	5.6	7.966			13.566	5.2	9.333			14.533	14.049
7	Arsenii Dukhno	5.2	9.000			14.200	4.4	8.233			12.633	13.416
8	(Armenia) Artur Davtyan	5.2	9.533		0.1	14.833	3.2	8.700			11.900	13.366

=== Parallel bars ===
Oldest and youngest competitors

	Name	Country	Date of birth	Age
Youngest	Altan Doğan	Turkey	7 June 2005	21 years, 2 months and 15 days
Oldest	Ferhat Arıcan	Turkey	28 July 1993	33 years and 25 days

Rank	Gymnast	D Score	E Score	Pen.	Bon.	Total
1st place, gold medalist(s)	(Croatia) Illia Kovtun	5.8	8.800		0.1	14.700
2nd place, silver medalist(s)	(Turkey) Ferhat Arıcan	5.9	8.433		0.1	14.433
3rd place, bronze medalist(s)	(United Kingdom) Joe Fraser	5.6	8.700			14.300
4	(Israel) Ron Pyatov	5.5	8.700		0.1	14.300
5	(Turkey) Altan Doğan	5.3	8.700		0.1	14.100
6	(Ukraine) Nazar Chepurnyi	5.4	8.600			14.000
7	(Hungary) Krisztofer Mészáros	5.5	8.500			14.000
8	(Belgium) Nicola Cuyle	5.2	8.566			13.766

=== Horizontal bar ===
Oldest and youngest competitors

	Name	Country	Date of birth	Age
Youngest	Savelii Sieedin	WG2	17 October 2006	19 years, 10 months and 5 days
Oldest	Robert Tvorogal	Lithuania	5 October 1994	31 years, 10 months and 17 days

Rank	Gymnast	D Score	E Score	Pen.	Bon.	Total
1st place, gold medalist(s)	(United Kingdom) Joe Fraser	5.9	8.400			14.300
2nd place, silver medalist(s)	(Cyprus) Marios Georgiou	5.5	8.700			14.200
3rd place, bronze medalist(s)	Savelii Sieedin	5.5	8.566			14.066
4	(Croatia) Illia Kovtun	5.4	8.600			14.000
5	(Lithuania) Robert Tvorogal	5.6	8.166			13.766
6	(Bulgaria) Caden Spencer	5.2	7.500			12.700
7	(Switzerland) Noe Seifert	5.2	7.466			12.666
8	(Germany) Radomyr Stelmakh	5.0	7.000			12.000
