= Artistic gymnastics at the 2023 European Youth Summer Olympic Festival =

- Venue: Tabor Hall
- Location: Maribor, Slovenia
- Date: 25–29 July 2023

Artistic gymnastics at the 2023 European Youth Summer Olympic Festival was held at Tabor Hall in Maribor, Slovenia from 25 to 29 July 2023.

== Medals summary ==
=== Medalists ===
==== Boys ====
Event	Gold	Silver	Bronze
Team all-around	Great Britain; Alex Niscoveanu; Jonas Rushworth; Sol Scott	Italy; Manuel Berettera; Tommaso Brugnami; Diego Vazzola	Armenia; Robert Gyulumyan; Mamikon Khachatryan; Hamlet Manukyan
Individual all-around	Tommaso Brugnami; Italy	Jonas Rushworth; Great Britain	Alex Niscoveanu; Great Britain
Floor exercise	Tommaso Brugnami; Italy	Anthony Mansard; France	Robert Gyulumyan; Armenia
Pommel horse	Mamikon Khachatryan; Armenia	Serafeim Eminidis; Greece	Dachi Dolidze; Georgia
Rings	Hamlet Manukyan; Armenia	Tommaso Brugnami; Italy	Diego Vazzola; Italy
Vault	Tommaso Brugnami; Italy	Jonáš Danek; Czech Republic	Sol Scott; Great Britain
Parallel bars	Yoan Ivanov; Bulgaria	Ivan Rudyi; Ukraine	Sviatoslav Shved; Ukraine
Horizontal bar	Zala Zámbori; Hungary	Manuel Berettera; Italy	Ivan Rudyi; Ukraine

==== Girls ====
Event	Gold	Silver	Bronze
Team all-around	Italy; Sara Caputo; Emma Fioravanti; Benedetta Gava	Germany; Marlene Gotthardt; Helen Kevric; Lisa Wötzel	Great Britain; Ema Kandalova; Ellie Lewis; Jemima Taylor
Individual all-around	Helen Kevric; Germany	Sara Caputo; Italy	Emma Fioravanti; Italy Ema Kandalova; Great Britain
Vault	Sara Caputo; Italy	Helen Kevric; Germany	Vanesa Masova; Czech Republic
Uneven bars	Helen Kevric; Germany	Sara Caputo; Italy	Vanesa Masova; Czech Republic
Balance beam	Helen Kevric; Germany	Gabriela Vănoagă; Romania	Marlene Gotthardt; Germany
Floor exercise	Helen Kevric; Germany	Emma Fioravanti; Italy	Lilou Viallat; France

==== Mixed ====
Event	Gold	Silver	Bronze
Pairs	Italy; Tommaso Brugnami; Sara Caputo	Germany; Mert Öztürk; Helen Kevric	France; Naël Sakouhi; Lilou Viallat

=== Medal standings ===
==== Overall ====
Rank	Nation	Gold	Silver	Bronze	Total
1	Italy (ITA)	6	6	2	14
2	Germany (GER)	4	3	1	8
3	Armenia (ARM)	2	0	2	4
4	Great Britain (GBR)	1	1	4	6
5	Bulgaria (BUL)	1	0	0	1
5	Hungary (HUN)	1	0	0	1
7	Czech Republic (CZE)	0	1	2	3
7	France (FRA)	0	1	2	3
7	Ukraine (UKR)	0	1	2	3
10	Greece (GRE)	0	1	0	1
10	Romania (ROU)	0	1	0	1
12	Georgia (GEO)	0	0	1	1
Totals (12 entries)		15	15	16	46

==== Boys ====
Rank	Nation	Gold	Silver	Bronze	Total
1	Italy (ITA)	3	3	1	7
2	Armenia (ARM)	2	0	2	4
3	Great Britain (GBR)	1	1	2	4
4	Bulgaria (BUL)	1	0	0	1
4	Hungary (HUN)	1	0	0	1
6	Ukraine (UKR)	0	1	2	3
7	Czech Republic (CZE)	0	1	0	1
7	France (FRA)	0	1	0	1
7	Greece (GRE)	0	1	0	1
10	Georgia (GEO)	0	0	1	1
Totals (10 entries)		8	8	8	24

==== Girls ====
Rank	Nation	Gold	Silver	Bronze	Total
1	Germany (GER)	4	2	1	7
2	Italy (ITA)	2	3	1	6
3	Romania (ROU)	0	1	0	1
4	Czech Republic (CZE)	0	0	2	2
4	Great Britain (GBR)	0	0	2	2
6	France (FRA)	0	0	1	1
Totals (6 entries)		6	6	7	19

==== Mixed ====
Rank	Nation	Gold	Silver	Bronze	Total
1	Italy (ITA)	1	0	0	1
2	Germany (GER)	0	1	0	1
3	France (FRA)	0	0	1	1
Totals (3 entries)		1	1	1	3

== Mixed results ==
=== Pairs ===
==== Rounds 1&2 ====
Rank	Team	Gymnast	Apparatus 1	Scores 1	Apparatus 2	Scores 2	Total
1	Germany	Mert Öztürk	HB	13.066	FX	12.766	51.898
1	Germany	Helen Kevric	FX	12.766	VT	13.300	51.898
2	Italy	Tommaso Brugnami	PB	13.100	HB	12.000	51.533
2	Italy	Sara Caputo	VT	13.733	BB	12.700	51.533
3	Switzerland	Carlo Riesco	PB	12.866	FX	13.233	51.332
3	Switzerland	Kea Walser	VT	13.100	FX	12.133	51.332
4	France	Naël Sakouhi	PB	12.833	FX	12.533	50.799
4	France	Lilou Viallat	VT	12.900	FX	12.533	50.799
5	Ukraine	Ivan Rudyi	PB	13.500	FX	13.133	50.666
5	Ukraine	Diana Lobok	VT	12.100	FX	11.933	50.666
6	Belgium	Kyano Schepers	PB	13.166	HB	12.300	50.365
6	Belgium	Chloe Baert	FX	12.533	VT	12.366	50.365
7	Spain	Sergio Kovacs	PB	12.700	HB	12.766	50.032
7	Spain	Leire Escauriaza	VT	12.866	FX	11.700	50.032
8	Great Britain	Alex Niscoveanu	FX	12.266	PB	12.733	49.732
8	Great Britain	Ema Kandalova	FX	11.700	VT	13.033	49.732
9	Romania	David Puicea	PB	12.766	FX	11.300	49.298
9	Romania	Gabriela Vănoagă	VT	12.866	BB	12.366	49.298
10	Czech Republic	Tomas Kalinic	HB	11.933	PB	11.933	49.298
10	Czech Republic	Vanesa Masova	VT	13.166	FX	12.266	49.298
11	Austria	Vincent Lindpointner	FX	12.900	HB	12.200	47.899
11	Austria	Valentina Frint	VT	12.266	BB	10.533	47.899
12	Norway	Kasper Bernsten	FX	12.200	HB	11.466	47.565
12	Norway	Hannah Ifeanyi	BB	12.033	VT	11.866	47.565
13	Netherlands	Leon Atherton	PB	12.066	FX	10.633	47.365
13	Netherlands	Alij de Wijze	FX	11.733	VT	12.933	47.365
14	Turkey	Metehan Kartin	FX	10.633	PB	12.733	45.399
14	Turkey	Naz Aktürk	FX	11.133	VT	10.933	45.399
15	Poland	Filip Koperski	PB	12.166	HB	9.000	44.832
15	Poland	Maria Drobniak	FX	11.866	BB	11.800	44.832
16	Hungary	Zala Zambori	HB	10.300	PB	12.000	43.633
16	Hungary	Anna Knight	FX	10.833	BB	10.500	43.633

==== Semifinals ====
Bracket 1

Rank	Team	Gymnast	Apparatus	Scores	Total	Qual.
1	Germany	Mert Öztürk	PB	13.100	26.300	R5
1	Germany	Helen Kevric	BB	12.733	26.300	R5
2	France	Naël Sakouhi	HB		25.466	R4
2	France	Lilou Viallat	BB	12.733	25.466	R4

Bracket 2

Rank	Team	Gymnast	Apparatus	Scores	Total	Qual.
1	Italy	Tommaso Brugnami	FX	13.466	26.399	R5
1	Italy	Sara Caputo	FX	12.933	26.399	R5
2	Switzerland	Carlo Riesco	HB	12.600	23.800	R4
2	Switzerland	Kea Walser	BB	11.200	23.800	R4

==== Third place match ====
Rank	Team	Gymnast	Apparatus	Scores	Total
3rd place, bronze medalist(s)	France	Naël Sakouhi	PB	13.166	25.915
3rd place, bronze medalist(s)	France	Lilou Viallat	VT	12.749	25.915
4	Switzerland	Carlo Riesco	FX	13.033	25.816
4	Switzerland	Kea Wasler	VT	12.873	25.816

==== Championship match ====
Rank	Team	Gymnast	Apparatus	Scores	Total
1st place, gold medalist(s)	Italy	Tommaso Brugnami	FX	13.533	26.816
1st place, gold medalist(s)	Italy	Sara Caputo	VT	13.283	26.816
2nd place, silver medalist(s)	Germany	Mert Öztürk	HB	13.033	26.582
2nd place, silver medalist(s)	Germany	Helen Kevric	VT	13.549	26.582
