= Ema Kandalova =

English artistic gymnast

- Full name: Ema Grace Kandalova
- Born: 26 August 2008 (age 18)

Gymnastics career
- Discipline: Women's artistic gymnastics
- Country represented: (United Kingdom) Great Britain; (2022–present)
- Club: Tolworth Gym Club

Ema Grace Kandalova (born 26 August 2008) is an English artistic gymnast and national team member. She is a silver medallist on beam and bronze medallist on floor at the 2025 British Championships.

As a junior Kandalova represented Great Britain at the 2023 European Youth Summer Olympic Festival, where she won team and all-around bronze, and also at the 2023 Junior World Championships.

== Junior gymnastics career ==
=== 2023 ===
At the 2023 English Championships Kandalova won bronze in the all-around and on vault. She later won silver on floor at Welsh Championships. At British Championships Kandalova placed 7th in the all-around.

She represented Great Britain at the 2023 Junior World Championships alongside Abigail Martin and Jemima Taylor where the team finished 9th. Later that year Kandalova was named in the British team for the 2023 European Youth Summer Olympic Festival where she won team and all-around bronze.

== Senior gymnastics career ==
=== 2024 ===
At her first British Championships as a senior Kandalova placed 15th in the all-around and made the bars and beam apparatus finals.

Kandalova represented England at the 2024 Leverkusen Cup alongside Shanna-Kae Grant and Tiegan Trafford where they won gold in the team competition. Individually Kandalova also won gold on vault and balance beam as well as silver in the all-around competition.

=== 2025 ===
At English Championships Kandalova placed 6th in the all-around. Later at the 2025 British Championships she placed 5th in the all-around, winning silver on beam and bronze on floor.

Kandalova was selected to represent Great Britain alongside Frances Stone, Shantae-Eve Amankwaah, Tilly Wright and Grace Davies at the 2025 DTB Pokal Team Challenge in Stuttgart where they won bronze. Kandalova qualified for the beam final where she also won bronze.

== Competitive History ==
Year	Event	Team	AA	VT	UB	BB	FX
Espoir
2021	Rushmoor Rose Bowl		12				
2021	British Championships		6		3rd place, bronze medalist(s)		
Junior
2022	English Championships		11				
2022	British Championships		12				
2022	British Team Championships		7				
2022	Rushmoor Rose Bowl	3rd place, bronze medalist(s)	5	2nd place, silver medalist(s)	4	6	
2022	Vera Caslavska Grand Prix	2nd place, silver medalist(s)	4	1st place, gold medalist(s)	3rd place, bronze medalist(s)		
2023	English Championships		3rd place, bronze medalist(s)	3rd place, bronze medalist(s)			
2023	Welsh Championships						2nd place, silver medalist(s)
2023	British Championships		7				
2023	Junior World Championships	9					
2023	European Youth Olympic Festival	3rd place, bronze medalist(s)	3rd place, bronze medalist(s)				
Senior
2024	Welsh Championships		11				
2024	English Championships		9				
2024	British Championships		15		8	8	
2024	Leverkusen Cup	1st place, gold medalist(s)	2nd place, silver medalist(s)	1st place, gold medalist(s)		1st place, gold medalist(s)	
2025	English Championships		6				
2025	British Championships		5			2nd place, silver medalist(s)	3rd place, bronze medalist(s)
2025	DTB Pokal Team Challenge	3rd place, bronze medalist(s)				3rd place, bronze medalist(s)	
