= 2024 NCAA men's gymnastics championship =

Men's Gymnastics Championship

2024 NCAA Men's Gymnastics Championships
- Venue: Covelli Center
- Location: Columbus, Ohio
- Dates: April 19–20, 2024
- Competitors: Stanford; Michigan; Oklahoma; Nebraska; Illinois; Ohio State; California; Navy; Greenville; Penn State; Air Force; Springfield
- Winning score: 425.324

Champion
- Stanford

The 2024 NCAA Men's Gymnastics Championships were held from April 19–20, 2024 at the Covelli Center in Columbus, Ohio. Stanford won their fifth consecutive NCAA championship.

== National qualifier sessions ==
=== Session 1 ===
The first national qualifier session of the 2024 NCAA Men's Gymnastics Championships took place on April 19, 2024. The following teams competed in Session 1.

- No. 1 Stanford
- No. 4 Illinois
- No. 5 Nebraska
- No. 8 California
- No. 9 Navy
- No. 12 Greenville

School	Floor	Pommel horse	Rings	Vault	Parallel bars	High bars	Total
Stanford	67.988	70.299	69.698	71.988	71.698	65.698	417.389
Nebraska	69.965	68.032	67.699	72.231	67.832	67.764	413.523
Illinois	69.732	68.800	67.199	71.799	67.466	65.465	410.461
California	66.966	66.988	67.332	71.564	68.566	65.732	407.158
Navy	67.166	64.131	65.132	70.631	66.098	63.132	396.290
Greenville	67.499	60.931	62.365	70.365	66.332	61.665	389.157

=== Session 2 ===
The second national qualifier session of the 2024 NCAA Men's Gymnastics Championships took place on April 19, 2024. The following teams competed in Session 2.

- No. 2 Oklahoma
- No. 3 Michigan
- No. 6 Ohio State
- No. 7 Penn State
- No. 10 Air Force
- No. 11 Springfield

School	Floor	Pommel horse	Rings	Vault	Parallel bars	High bars	Total
Oklahoma	69.465	70.332	67.999	72.866	70.364	67.931	418.957
Michigan	69.498	67.798	69.231	72.131	71.965	69.331	418.954
Ohio State	69.066	68.166	66.564	72.331	66.598	66.000	408.725
Penn State	66.298	66.965	67.198	71.799	66.765	66.398	405.423
Air Force	64.931	68.164	64.565	70.965	67.265	62.199	398.089
Springfield	61.865	63.865	63.265	69.465	63.665	60.065	382.190

== NCAA Championship ==
The top three teams from each session advanced to the National Championship.

=== Standings ===
- National Champion: Stanford – 425.324
- 2nd Place: Michigan – 419.689
- 3rd Place: Oklahoma – 412.956

School	Ranking	Floor	Pommel horse	Rings	Vault	Parallel bars	High bars	Total
Stanford	1st	70.165	72.065	70.498	73.632	72.199	66.765	425.324
Michigan	2nd	70.832	68.532	70.065	71.965	71.631	66.664	419.689
Oklahoma	3rd	69.664	69.432	67.464	73.532	68.165	64.699	412.956
Nebraska	4th	69.333	69.232	67.958	72.932	65.166	68.166	412.427
Illinois	5th	69.699	67.499	67.165	72.065	67.465	67.766	411.659
Ohio State	6th	66.665	66.832	65.631	68.431	65.865	65.698	399.112

=== Results ===
Rank	Team	Floor (gymnastics)	Pommel horse	Rings (gymnastics)	Vault (gymnastics)	Parallel bars	Horizontal bar	Total
1st place, gold medalist(s)	Stanford	70.165	72.065	70.498	73.632	72.199	66.765	425.324
1st place, gold medalist(s)	Mark Berlaga			13.933				425.324
1st place, gold medalist(s)	Jeremy Bischoff	14.200					13.166	425.324
1st place, gold medalist(s)	Taylor Burkhart	13.966		13.833	14.300	13.600	13.333	425.324
1st place, gold medalist(s)	Arun Chhetri			13.966				425.324
1st place, gold medalist(s)	J.R. Chou		14.500					425.324
1st place, gold medalist(s)	Asher Hong		14.066	14.966	15.266	15.100		425.324
1st place, gold medalist(s)	Marcus Kushner		14.133					425.324
1st place, gold medalist(s)	Luke McFarland		14.133			14.133		425.324
1st place, gold medalist(s)	Brandon Nguyen				14.433		13.600	425.324
1st place, gold medalist(s)	Kaien Orion J-Spencer	13.800						425.324
1st place, gold medalist(s)	Colt Walker	14.033		13.800	14.500	14.466	13.266	425.324
1st place, gold medalist(s)	Khoi Young	14.166	15.233		15.133	14.900	13.400	425.324
2nd place, silver medalist(s)	Michigan	70.832	68.532	70.065	71.965	71.631	66.664	419.689
2nd place, silver medalist(s)	Javier Alfonso			14.333				419.689
2nd place, silver medalist(s)	Landen Blixt	14.433			14.333			419.689
2nd place, silver medalist(s)	Crew Bold	13.766				14.566	13.866	419.689
2nd place, silver medalist(s)	Kevin Chow		13.900					419.689
2nd place, silver medalist(s)	Zach Granados		13.866					419.689
2nd place, silver medalist(s)	Paul Juda	14.800	12.833	13.966	15.133	14.166	12.866	419.689
2nd place, silver medalist(s)	Logan McKeown					14.333		419.689
2nd place, silver medalist(s)	Lais Najjar	14.000						419.689
2nd place, silver medalist(s)	Robert Noll						13.366	419.689
2nd place, silver medalist(s)	Rithik Puri			13.866				419.689
2nd place, silver medalist(s)	Chris Read			13.500	13.633			419.689
2nd place, silver medalist(s)	Fred Richard	13.833	14.200	14.400	14.333	14.133	13.100	419.689
2nd place, silver medalist(s)	Evgeny Siminiuc					14.433	13.466	419.689
2nd place, silver medalist(s)	Kyle Walchuk		13.733					419.689
2nd place, silver medalist(s)	David Wolma				14.533			419.689
3rd place, bronze medalist(s)	Oklahoma	69.664	69.432	67.464	73.532	68.165	64.699	412.956
3rd place, bronze medalist(s)	Fuzzy Benas	13.766	13.966	13.766	14.800	14.566	13.000	412.956
3rd place, bronze medalist(s)	Max Bereznev				14.966			412.956
3rd place, bronze medalist(s)	Matthew Burgoyne			13.233				412.956
3rd place, bronze medalist(s)	Kelton Christiansen		13.600				13.200	412.956
3rd place, bronze medalist(s)	Emre Dodanli	14.433			14.600	14.333	13.266	412.956
3rd place, bronze medalist(s)	Tyler Flores		13.800		14.566	12.633		412.956
3rd place, bronze medalist(s)	Jack Freeman	13.266					13.400	412.956
3rd place, bronze medalist(s)	Brigham Frentheway	13.966			14.600		11.833	412.956
3rd place, bronze medalist(s)	Tas Hajdu			13.866				412.956
3rd place, bronze medalist(s)	Nico Hamilton	14.233				13.233		412.956
3rd place, bronze medalist(s)	Zachary Marckx			13.366				412.956
3rd place, bronze medalist(s)	Zach Nunez		14.066					412.956
3rd place, bronze medalist(s)	Daniel Simmons			13.233				412.956
3rd place, bronze medalist(s)	Ignacio Yockers		14.000			13.400		412.956
4	Nebraska	69.333	69.232	67.598	72.932	65. 166	68.166	412.427
4	Taylor Christopulos	14.500	13.400		15.000	12.033	13.900	412.427
4	Yanni Chronopoulos		13.900					412.427
4	Asher Cohen			13.966		13.333		412.427
4	James Friedman			13.466		13.400		412.427
4	Cooper Giles		14.300					412.427
4	Chris Hiser			13.866				412.427
4	Luke James	14.100			14.300			412.427
4	Toby Liang	13.333						412.427
4	Chase Mondi	13.600			14.766			412.427
4	Max Odden						13.433	412.427
4	Cole Partridge					13.600	13.333	412.427
4	Sam Phillips	13.800		13.700		12.800	13.600	412.427
4	Zachary Tiderman				14.800		13.900	412.427
4	Travis Wong		13.966	12.600				412.427
4	Nathan York		13.666		14.066			412.427
5	Illinois	69.699	67.499	67.164	72.065	67.465	67.766	411.659
5	Ashton Anaya			14.166				411.659
5	Ethan Boder			13.233				411.659
5	Tate Costa	13.800				13.533	13.900	411.659
5	Brandon Dang		14.500					411.659
5	Michael Fletcher	13.900			14.400	14.100	13.566	411.659
5	Will Hauke		14.100			12.400		411.659
5	Sebastian Ingersoll			13.400			13.600	411.659
5	Connor McCool	14.466			14.400			411.659
5	Connor Micklos		12.366					411.659
5	Preston Ngai		13.933		14.533			411.659
5	Vahe Petrosyan					13.766	13.300	411.659
5	Garrett Schooley		12.600	13.433	14.566	13.666		411.659
5	Amari Sewell	13.933			14.166			411.659
5	Dylan Shepard	13.600						411.659
5	Ryan Vanichtheeranont			12.933			13.400	411.659
6	Ohio State	66.665	66.832	65.631	68.431	65.865	65.698	399.122
6	Arthur Ashton			13.266				399.122
6	Justin Ciccone	11.766			13.366			399.122
6	Chase Davenport-Mills	14.200			14.066		12.666	399.122
6	Kristian Grahovski		13.600			12.633		399.122
6	Jacob Harmon						12.566	399.122
6	Kazuki Hayashi	14.066			14.866	13.366	13.466	399.122
6	Donovan Hewitt			13.833				399.122
6	Jakob Murray					13.400		399.122
6	Kameron Nelson	14.233		12.933	14.633		12.433	399.122
6	Michael Nguyen		13.266					399.122
6	Jesse Pakele	12.400	13.700	12.666				399.122
6	Tyler Rockwood		12.000	12.933		12.700		399.122
6	Zach Snyder				11.500			399.122
6	Caden Spencer					13.766	13.700	399.122
6	Parker Thackston		14.266				13.300	399.122

== Individual event finals ==
The top-three all-around competitors and top-three individuals on each event who are not members of one of the qualifying teams advanced from each pre-qualifying session to the finals session to compete for individual titles. Finals competition took place on April 20.

=== Medalists ===
Event	Gold	Silver	Bronze
Individual all-around	Khoi Young (Stanford)	Fred Richard (Michigan)	Fuzzy Benas (Oklahoma)
Floor	Paul Juda (Michigan)	Taylor Christopulos (Nebraska)	Connor McCool (Illinois)
Pommel horse	Patrick Hoopes (Air Force)	Khoi Young (Stanford)	J.R. Chou (Stanford)
Rings	Asher Hong (Stanford)	Fred Richard (Michigan)	Javier Alfonso (Michigan)
Vault	Asher Hong (Stanford)	Paul Juda (Michigan)	Khoi Young (Stanford)
Parallel bars	Asher Hong (Stanford)	Khoi Young (Stanford)	Josh Karnes (Penn State)
High bar	Tate Costa (Illinois)	Zachary Tiderman (Nebraska)	Taylor Christopulos (Nebraska)
