= Gabriele Targhetta =

Italian gymnast

- Born: 17 March 2006 (age 20) Monza, Lombardy, Italy

Gymnastics career
- Discipline: Men's artistic gymnastics
- Country represented: Italy; (2024–present)
- Gym: Spes Mestre
- Head coach: Gianmatteo Centazzo
Medal record
Men's artistic gymnastics
Representing Italy
World Championships
Silver medal – second place	2026 Rotterdam	Pommel horse
European Championships
Gold medal – first place	2026 Zagreb	Pommel horse
Bronze medal – third place	2025 Leipzig	Pommel horse
FIG World Cup
Event	1st	2nd	3rd
Apparatus World Cup	1	1	0
World Challenge Cup	0	2	1
Total	1	3	1

Gabriele Targhetta (born 17 March 2006) is an Italian artistic gymnast. He is the 2026 World silver medalist, 2026 European champion, and 2025 European bronze medalist on pommel horse.

== Early life ==
Targhetta was born in Monza in 2006.

== Gymnastics career ==
Targhetta made his international debut for Italy at the 2024 Szombathely World Challenge Cup after having never represented Italy at the junior level. While there he won the silver medal on pommel horse behind compatriot Edoardo de Rosa.

In 2025 Targhetta competed at the World Cups in Osijek and Cairo. At the former he placed eleventh on pommel horse during the qualification round and did not advance to the final. In Cairo he won silver behind Hamlet Manukyan. Targhetta was later selected to compete at the 2025 European Championships as an individual. While there he won bronze on pommel horse behind Manukyan and Mamikon Khachatryan. In doing so, he became the first Italian to win a medal on the apparatus since Alberto Busnari in 2015.

At the 2026 European Championships, Targetta won gold on pommel horse ahead of Manukyan and Khachatryan. In doing so, he became the first Italian to win a European title on the apparatus. Targhetta next competed at the Paris World Challenge Cup where he won silver behind of Manukyan. In October, Targhetta competed at the 2026 World Championships where he qualified to the pommel horse final with a score of 14.833. During the final he scored 15.233 to win the silver medal behind Manukyan. In doing so, he became the first Italian to win a World medal on pommel horse in 113 years, with the last medals being won at the 1913 World Championships by Giorgio Zampori (gold) and Osvaldo Palazzi (silver).

== Competitive history ==
Year	Event	Team	AA	FX	PH	SR	VT	PB	HB
2024	Italian Championships				2nd place, silver medalist(s)				
2024	Szombathely World Challenge Cup				2nd place, silver medalist(s)				
2025	Osijek World Cup				11				
2025	Cairo World Cup				2nd place, silver medalist(s)				
2025	European Championships				3rd place, bronze medalist(s)				
2025	Paris World Challenge Cup				3rd place, bronze medalist(s)				
2025	World Championships				R1				
2026	Cottbus World Cup				1st place, gold medalist(s)				
2026	European Championships				1st place, gold medalist(s)				
2026	Paris World Challenge Cup				2nd place, silver medalist(s)				
2026	World Championships	9			2nd place, silver medalist(s)				
