= Hamlet Manukyan =

Armenian gymnast (born 2007)

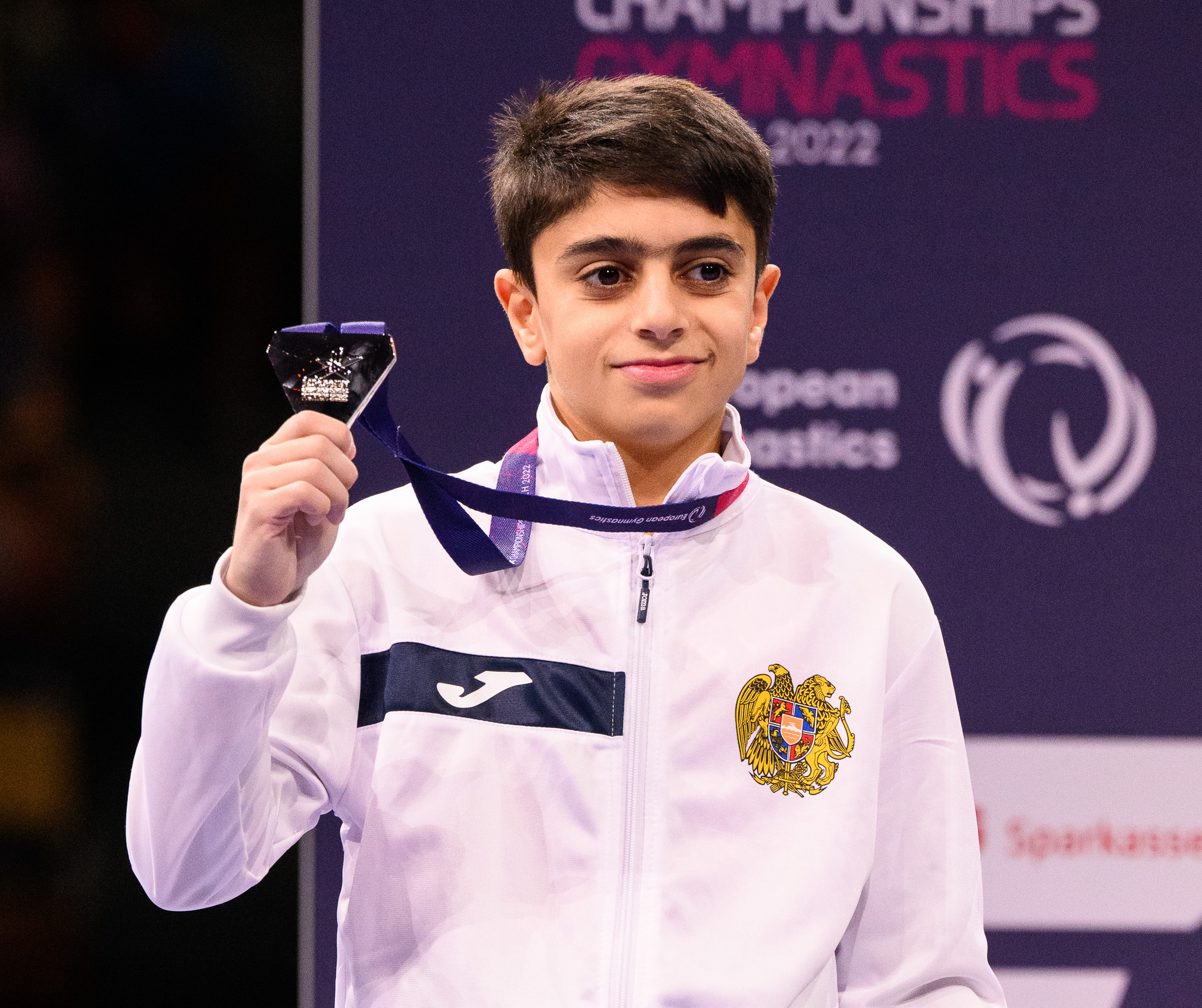
- Manukyan at the 2022 European Championships

Personal information
- Full name: Hamlet Manukyan
- Born: 22 August 2007 (age 19) Vagharshapat, Armenia

Gymnastics career
- Discipline: Men's artistic gymnastics
- Country represented: Armenia; (2018–present)
- Club: Armenian State Institute of Physical Culture
- Head coach: Hakob Serobyan
- Assistant coach: Hayk Nazaryan
- Eponymous skills: Manukyan (Pommel Horse)
Medal record
Men's artistic gymnastics
Representing Armenia
World Championships
| Gold medal – first place | 2026 Rotterdam | Pommel horse |
European Championships
| Gold medal – first place | 2025 Leipzig | Pommel horse |
| Silver medal – second place | 2026 Zagreb | Pommel horse |
World University Games
| Gold medal – first place | 2025 Rhine-Ruhr | Pommel horse |
Junior World Championships
| Gold medal – first place | 2023 Antalya | Pommel horse |
| Gold medal – first place | 2023 Antalya | Rings |
FIG World Cup
| Event | 1st | 2nd | 3rd |
|---|---|---|---|
| Apparatus World Cup | 5 | 0 | 0 |
| World Challenge Cup | 1 | 1 | 0 |
| Total | 6 | 1 | 0 |

Hamlet Manukyan (born 22 August 2007) is an Armenian artistic gymnast. He is the 2026 World and 2025 European champion on the pommel horse. Additionally, he is the 2023 Junior World Champion on pommel horse and rings.

== Early life ==
Manukyan was born in Armenia in 2007. His father had him start gymnastics training when he was five years old.

== Gymnastics career ==
=== 2022–24 ===
Manukyan competed at the 2022 Junior European Championships where he placed thirteenth in the all-around. During event finals, he won silver on both pommel horse and rings.

In late March, Manukyan competed at the 2023 Junior World Championships alongside Erik Baghdasaryan and Mamikon Khachatryan. As a team, they finished fourth, 0.437 points behind third-place Italy. Individually, Manukyan qualified to the all-around, pommel horse, and rings event finals. During the all-around final, Manukyan finished sixth. During apparatus event finals, Manukyan won gold on both pommel horse and rings. Manukyan next competed at the 2023 European Youth Olympic Festival alongside Khachatryan and Robert Gyulumyan; together they won bronze as a team and individually Manukyan finished ninth in the all-around and qualified to the pommel horse and rings event finals. During event finals, he finished fourth on pommel horse despite falling off the apparatus and won gold on rings.

Manukyan competed at the 2024 Junior European Championships where he won gold on pommel horse.

=== 2025 ===
Manukyan became age-eligible for senior-level competition in 2025. He made his senior debut at the Cottbus World Cup. Despite qualifying to the pommel horse final in first place, during the final he fell off the apparatus and finished eighth. Manukyan next competed at the World Cups in Osijek, Doha, and Cairo, winning gold on pommel horse at all three.

At the 2025 European Championships Manukyan won gold on pommel horse, becoming the third Armenian to win the title on the apparatus after Harutyun Merdinyan (2016, 2022) and Artur Davtyan (2021). At the 2025 World University Games he once again won gold on pommel horse. Manukyan ended the year competing at the 2025 World Championships where he finished fourth on pommel horse.

Manukyan was named European Gymnastics Male Gymnast of the Year for 2025.

=== 2026 ===
Manukyan competed at the 2026 Cottbus World Cup where he finished seventh. Manukyan and the rest of the Armenian delegation were scheduled to compete at the Antalya World Cup; however flight disruptions in the Middle East caused them to be unable to travel to Antalya in time for the competition. Manukyan ended the World Cup series winning gold at both Cairo and Osijek.

At the 2026 European Championships, Manukyan won silver on pommel horse behind Gabriele Targhetta. Manukyan next competed at the Paris World Challenge Cup where he won gold ahead of Targhetta.

At the 2026 World Championships, Manukyan qualified to the pommel horse final in first place. During the final, Manukyan was the last competitor to compete. He performed cleanly and scored 15.300, the highest international score of the year on the apparatus, winning him the gold medal. In doing so, he became the first Armenian to win a World title on pommel horse. He finished ahead of Targetta and Mamikon Khachatryan; this was the first time two Armenians shared a podium at the World Championships.

== Eponymous skills ==
| Apparatus | Name | Description | Difficulty | Added to Code of Points |
|---|---|---|---|---|
| Pommel horse | Manukyan | Bertoncelj to Davtyan on one pommel | F (0.6) | 2025 Paris World Challenge Cup |

== Competitive history ==
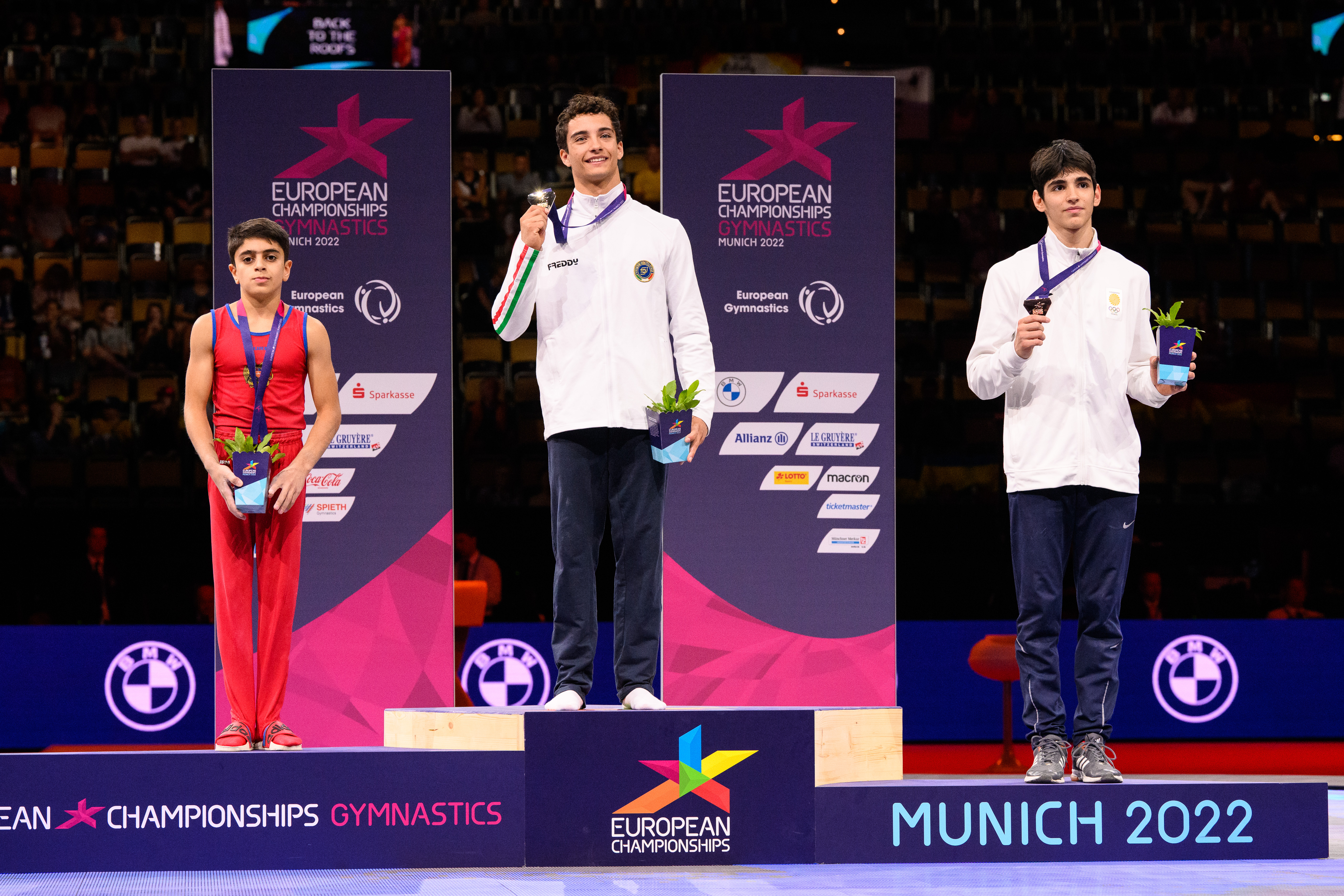
Manukyan (left) at the 2022 European Championships

Competitive history of Hamlet Manukyan at the junior level
| Year | Event | Team | AA | FX | PH | SR | VT | PB | HB |
|---|---|---|---|---|---|---|---|---|---|
| 2021 | Ukraine International Cup | 3rd place, bronze medalist(s) | 4 | 2nd place, silver medalist(s) | 2nd place, silver medalist(s) | 2nd place, silver medalist(s) | | 2nd place, silver medalist(s) | |
2022
| 2022 | European Championships | 12 | 13 | | 2nd place, silver medalist(s) | 2nd place, silver medalist(s) | | | |
2023
| 2023 | Junior World Championships | 4 | 6 | | 1st place, gold medalist(s) | 1st place, gold medalist(s) | | | |
| 2023 | European Youth Olympic Festival | 3rd place, bronze medalist(s) | 9 | | 4 | 1st place, gold medalist(s) | | | |
2024
| 2024 | European Championships | 10 | | | 1st place, gold medalist(s) | | | | |
| 2024 | Voronin Cup | 2nd place, silver medalist(s) | 3rd place, bronze medalist(s) | 3rd place, bronze medalist(s) | 1st place, gold medalist(s) | 1st place, gold medalist(s) | | | 2nd place, silver medalist(s) |
| 2024 | Christmas Cup | | | | 1st place, gold medalist(s) | | | | |

Competitive history of Hamlet Manukyan at the senior level
| Year | Event | Team | AA | FX | PH | SR | VT | PB | HB |
|---|---|---|---|---|---|---|---|---|---|
| 2025 | Cottbus World Cup | | | | 8 | | | | |
| 2025 | Osijek World Cup | | | | 1st place, gold medalist(s) | | | | |
| 2025 | Doha World Cup | | | | 1st place, gold medalist(s) | | | | |
| 2025 | Cairo World Cup | | | | 1st place, gold medalist(s) | | | | |
| 2025 | European Championships | | | | 1st place, gold medalist(s) | | | | |
| 2025 | World University Games | | | | 1st place, gold medalist(s) | | | | |
| 2025 | Paris World Challenge Cup | | | | 2nd place, silver medalist(s) | | | | |
| 2025 | World Championships | —N/a | | | 4 | | | | |
| 2026 | Cottbus World Cup | | | | 7 | | | | |
| 2026 | Cairo World Cup | | | | 1st place, gold medalist(s) | | | | |
| 2026 | Osijek World Cup | | | | 1st place, gold medalist(s) | | | | |
| 2026 | European Championships | | | | 2nd place, silver medalist(s) | | | | |
| 2026 | Paris World Challenge Cup | | | | 1st place, gold medalist(s) | | | | |
| 2026 | World Championships | | | | 1st place, gold medalist(s) | | | | |
