= Hong Yanming =

Chinese artistic gymnast

- 洪延明
- Born: 4 April 2006 (age 20) Jiangsu, China

Gymnastics career
- Discipline: Men's artistic gymnastics
- Country represented: China
Medal record
Men's artistic gymnastics
Representing China
World Championships
Gold medal – first place	2025 Jakarta	Pommel horse
Bronze medal – third place	2026 Rotterdam	Team
National Games
Gold medal – first place	2025 Guangdong	Team

Hong Yanming (Chinese: 洪延明; pinyin: hóng yán míng; born 4 April 2006) is a Chinese artistic gymnast. He is the 2025 World champion on the pommel horse. At the junior level, he is the 2024 Asian champion in the all-around and the pommel horse.

== Gymnastics career ==
Hong won a gold medal on the pommel horse at the 2022 Chinese Youth Championships. He then placed sixth in the pommel horse final at the 2023 Chinese Championships. He won a gold medal in the team competition with the Jiangsu provincial team at the 2024 Chinese Championships. Individually, he placed tenth in the all-around and sixth on the pommel horse. He was then selected to compete at the 2024 Junior Asian Championships, winning a gold medal with the Chinese team. Additionally, he won the individual all-around title and won another gold medal in the pommel horse final.

Hong made his senior-level international debut at the 2025 Doha World Cup, where he won the silver medal on the pommel horse. He then won the national pommel horse title at the 2025 Chinese Championships, where he also won a team gold medal. He was selected to represent China at the 2025 World Artistic Gymnastics Championships in Jakarta, Indonesia, and qualified for the pommel horse final in second place with a score of 14.600. He also scored 14.600 in the final and ultimately won the gold medal after winning the execution-score tie-breaker over Armenia's Mamikon Khachatryan. After the World Championships, he competed at the National Games of China and won a gold medal in the team event.

== Competitive history ==
Competitive history of Hong Yanming
Year	Event	Team	AA	FX	PH	SR	VT	PB	HB
2025	World Championships				1st place, gold medalist(s)				
2026	World Championships	(bronze) (Note: Hong was the team alternate.)							
