= 2025 World Artistic Gymnastics Championships =

Artistic gymnastics competition

2025 World Artistic Gymnastics Championships

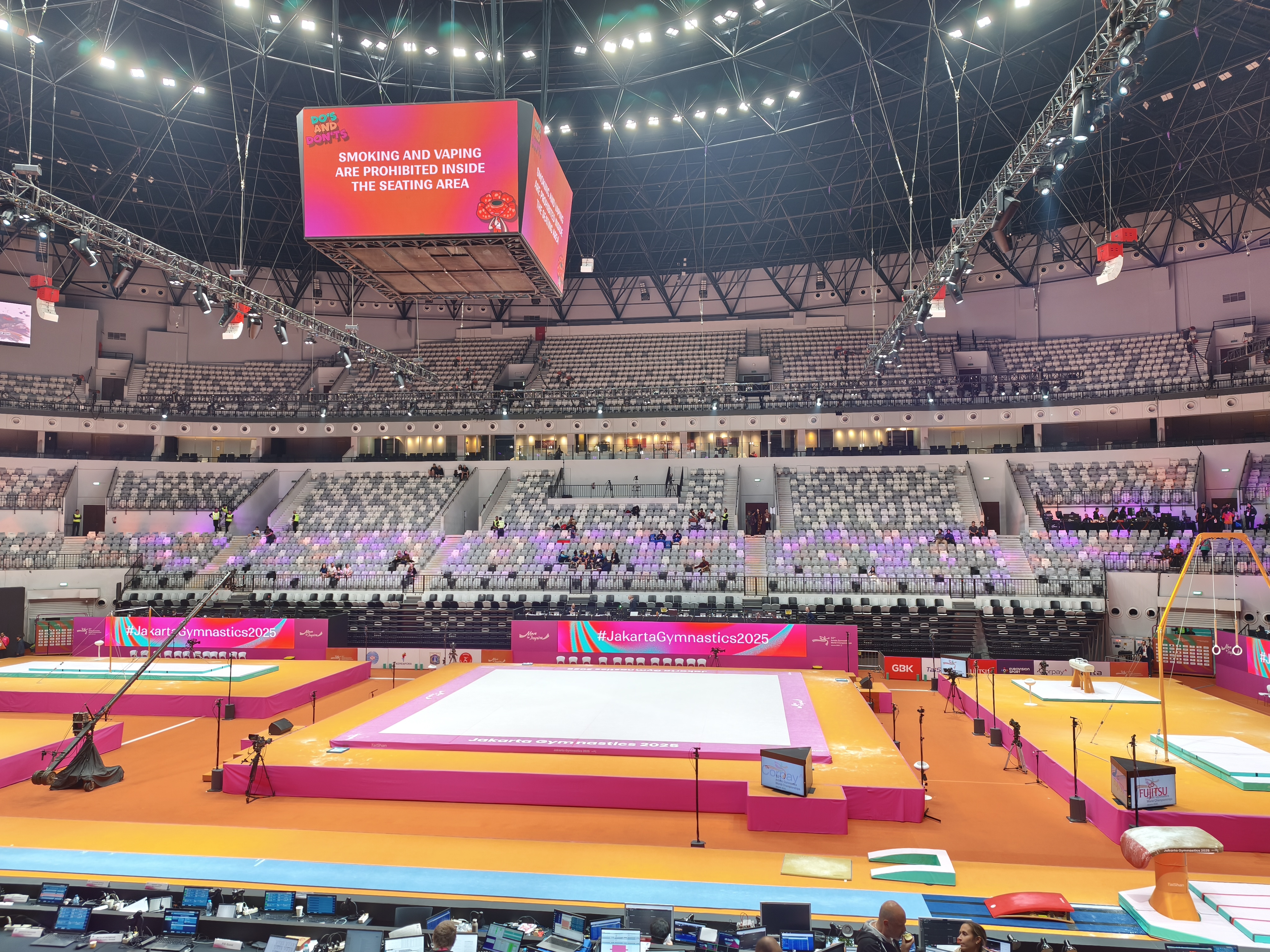
- Venue: Indonesia Arena
- Location: Jakarta, Indonesia
- Start date: October 19, 2025
- End date: October 25, 2025
- Nations: 75
- Website: https://jakartagymnastics2025.id/

The 2025 World Artistic Gymnastics Championships was held at the Indonesia Arena in Jakarta, Indonesia from October 19–25, 2025. It was the first world artistic gymnastics championship hosted by any Southeast Asian country. Like other world championships held in the year after the Olympics, there was no team competition.

== Competition schedule ==
The draw that determined which qualification subdivision gymnasts competed in was held on 4 August 2025, at the FIG headquarters in Lausanne.

Competition schedule
Date	Session	Time	Subdivisions
Wednesday, October 15 – Saturday, October 18	Podium training		
Sunday, October 19	Men's Qualification	10:00 AM	MAG: Subdivision 1 Algeria, Malaysia, Poland, Jamaica, Syria, Japan, AIN (Note: Authorized Neutral Athletes from Belarus), Iran, Greece, Panama
Sunday, October 19	Men's Qualification	11:50 AM	MAG: Subdivision 2 Croatia, Sri Lanka, Great Britain, Lithuania, Kazakhstan, Vietnam, Belgium, Namibia, Brazil, Jordan, Austria
Sunday, October 19	Men's Qualification	2:15 PM	MAG: Subdivision 3 Hungary, Chile, Mongolia, Italy, Peru, Monaco, Norway, Ukraine
Sunday, October 19	Men's Qualification	4:06 PM	MAG: Subdivision 4 Tunisia, AIN (Note: Authorized Neutral Athletes from Russia), Netherlands, Egypt, New Zealand, Armenia, Chinese Taipei, United States, Latvia
Sunday, October 19	Men's Qualification	6:30 PM	MAG: Subdivision 5 South Korea, South Africa, Germany, Cuba, Spain, Cyprus, Switzerland, Iceland, Cayman Islands, Bulgaria, Uzbekistan
Sunday, October 19	Men's Qualification	8:20 PM	MAG: Subdivision 6 Bangladesh, Thailand, Mexico, Singapore, Czechia, Morocco, Colombia, Qatar, Sweden, Luxembourg, Philippines, Albania
Monday, October 20	Men's Qualification	10:00 AM	MAG: Subdivision 7 Portugal, Denmark, Venezuela, Australia, Serbia, Indonesia, India, Puerto Rico, Slovenia, Hong Kong
Monday, October 20	Men's Qualification	11:50 AM	MAG: Subdivision 8 Azerbaijan, Finland, China, Turkey, Cameroon, Canada, France, Trinidad and Tobago
Monday, October 20	Women's Qualification	5:00 PM	WAG: Subdivision 1 Netherlands, Venezuela, Austria, Azerbaijan, Japan, Panama
Monday, October 20	Women's Qualification	6:30 PM	WAG: Subdivision 2 South Korea, Finland, Sri Lanka, Turkey, Jamaica, Canada
Monday, October 20	Women's Qualification	8:00 PM	WAG: Subdivision 3 Germany, Uzbekistan, Singapore, Luxembourg, Chinese Taipei, Peru, Algeria
Tuesday, October 21	Women's Qualification	10:00 AM	WAG: Subdivision 4 New Zealand, Liechtenstein, United States, Croatia, Bangladesh, Great Britain, Poland
Tuesday, October 21	Women's Qualification	11:30 AM	WAG: Subdivision 5 Malaysia, Switzerland, Italy, France, Vietnam, Morocco
Tuesday, October 21	Women's Qualification	1:30 PM	WAG: Subdivision 6 Australia, Egypt, Belgium, Latvia, Romania, Mongolia, Sweden, Costa Rica
Tuesday, October 21	Women's Qualification	3:00 PM	WAG: Subdivision 7 Indonesia, Tunisia, Colombia, Philippines, Mexico, Syria
Tuesday, October 21	Women's Qualification	4:30 PM	WAG: Subdivision 8 Norway, Brazil, Qatar, India, South Africa, Ukraine, Chile
Tuesday, October 21	Women's Qualification	6:30 PM	WAG: Subdivision 9 AIN, Namibia, Portugal, Thailand, Bulgaria, Slovenia, Cameroon
Tuesday, October 21	Women's Qualification	8:00 PM	WAG: Subdivision 10; Spain, AIN, Hungary, Hong Kong, China, Kazakhstan, Czechia
Wednesday, October 22	Men's Individual All-Around Final	6:30–9:00 PM	Top 24 from qualification
Thursday, October 23	Women's Individual All-Around Final	6:30–9:00 PM	Top 24 from qualification
Friday, October 24	Apparatus Finals	2:00–6:00 PM	MAG: Floor, Pommel horse, Rings
Friday, October 24	Apparatus Finals	2:00–6:00 PM	WAG: Vault, Uneven bars
Saturday, October 25	Apparatus Finals	2:00–6:00 PM	MAG: Vault, Parallel bars, Horizontal bar
Saturday, October 25	Apparatus Finals	2:00–6:00 PM	WAG: Balance beam, Floor
Listed in local time (UTC+07:00).

== Medal summary ==
=== Medalists ===
Event	Gold	Silver	Bronze
Men
Individual all-around	(Japan) Daiki Hashimoto	(China) Zhang Boheng	(Switzerland) Noe Seifert
Floor	(United Kingdom) Jake Jarman	(United Kingdom) Luke Whitehouse	(Philippines) Carlos Yulo
Pommel horse	(China) Hong Yanming	(Armenia) Mamikon Khachatryan	(United States) Patrick Hoopes
Rings	(United States) Donnell Whittenburg	(Turkey) Adem Asil	(China) Lan Xingyu
Vault	(Philippines) Carlos Yulo	(Armenia) Artur Davtyan	(Ukraine) Nazar Chepurnyi
Parallel bars	(China) Zou Jingyuan	(Japan) Tomoharu Tsunogai	(Individual Neutral Athletes) Daniel Marinov
Horizontal bar	(United States) Brody Malone	(Japan) Daiki Hashimoto	(United Kingdom) Joe Fraser
Women
Individual all-around	(Individual Neutral Athletes) Angelina Melnikova	(United States) Leanne Wong	(China) Zhang Qingying
Vault	(Individual Neutral Athletes) Angelina Melnikova	(Canada) Lia Monica Fontaine	(United States) Joscelyn Roberson
Uneven bars	(Algeria) Kaylia Nemour	(Individual Neutral Athletes) Angelina Melnikova	(China) Yang Fanyuwei
Balance beam	(China) Zhang Qingying	(Algeria) Kaylia Nemour	(Japan) Aiko Sugihara
Floor	(Japan) Aiko Sugihara	(United Kingdom) Ruby Evans	(United Kingdom) Abigail Martin

=== Medal standings ===
==== Overall ====
* Host nation (Indonesia)

Rank	Nation	Gold	Silver	Bronze	Total
1	China	3	1	3	7
2	Japan	2	2	1	5
3	United States	2	1	2	5
–	Individual Neutral Athletes	2	1	1	4
4	Great Britain	1	2	2	5
5	Algeria	1	1	0	2
6	Philippines	1	0	1	2
7	Armenia	0	2	0	2
8	Canada	0	1	0	1
8	Turkey	0	1	0	1
10	Switzerland	0	0	1	1
10	Ukraine	0	0	1	1
Totals (11 entries)		12	12	12	36

==== Men ====
* Host nation (Indonesia)

Rank	Nation	Gold	Silver	Bronze	Total
1	China	2	1	1	4
2	United States	2	0	1	3
3	Japan	1	2	0	3
4	Great Britain	1	1	1	3
5	Philippines	1	0	1	2
6	Armenia	0	2	0	2
7	Turkey	0	1	0	1
8	Switzerland	0	0	1	1
8	Ukraine	0	0	1	1
–	Individual Neutral Athletes	0	0	1	1
Totals (9 entries)		7	7	7	21

==== Women ====
* Host nation (Indonesia)

Rank	Nation	Gold	Silver	Bronze	Total
–	Individual Neutral Athletes	2	1	0	3
1	Algeria	1	1	0	2
2	China	1	0	2	3
3	Japan	1	0	1	2
4	Great Britain	0	1	1	2
4	United States	0	1	1	2
6	Canada	0	1	0	1
Totals (6 entries)		5	5	5	15

== Men's results ==
=== Individual all-around ===
Rank	Gymnast	Floor (gymnastics)	Pommel horse	Rings (gymnastics)	Vault (gymnastics)	Parallel bars	Horizontal bar	Total
1st place, gold medalist(s)	(Japan) Daiki Hashimoto	14.100	13.966	13.566	14.466	14.433	14.700	85.131
2nd place, silver medalist(s)	(China) Zhang Boheng	13.600	13.700	14.600	14.200	13.933	14.300	84.333
3rd place, bronze medalist(s)	(Switzerland) Noe Seifert	13.866	14.000	13.066	13.733	14.066	14.100	82.831
4	(China) Shi Cong	13.066	13.500	13.466	13.966	13.866	14.433	82.297
5	(Japan) Shinnosuke Oka	11.866	13.333	14.066	13.466	14.666	14.400	81.797
6	(Colombia) Ángel Barajas	12.800	13.300	12.933	13.566	14.233	14.600	81.432
7	(Individual Neutral Athletes) Daniel Marinov	13.733	13.600	12.200	14.300	14.700	12.233	80.766
8	(Hungary) Krisztofer Mészáros	13.366	13.666	12.866	13.500	13.600	13.666	80.664
9	(Brazil) Caio Souza	12.366	12.466	13.866	14.133	13.833	13.866	80.530
10	(Switzerland) Florian Langenegger	12.966	13.400	12.400	13.800	13.733	13.300	79.599
11	(Australia) Jesse Moore	13.466	13.633	11.066	13.566	13.566	13.900	79.197
12	(France) Anthony Mansard	12.433	12.500	12.533	14.000	13.466	13.966	78.898
13	(South Korea) Ryu Sung-hyun	12.066	12.900	13.033	13.466	13.933	12.933	78.331
14	(Finland) Robert Kirmes	13.100	12.533	12.866	12.700	13.366	13.300	77.865
15	(Spain) Joel Plata	12.166	12.800	12.200	13.766	13.800	13.100	77.832
16	(Canada) Félix Dolci	13.600	10.966	12.900	13.800	12.133	13.933	77.332
17	(Brazil) Diogo Soares	13.233	13.466	12.566	13.400	13.166	11.433	77.264
18	(Norway) Sebastian Sponevik	13.233	11.466	12.633	14.233	12.933	12.366	76.864
19	(Germany) Timo Eder	13.000	11.633	11.400	13.900	13.333	13.533	76.799
20	(Finland) Akseli Karsikas	12.766	12.366	13.033	13.433	12.800	12.200	76.598
21	(Spain) Thierno Diallo	12.333	12.466	12.033	13.100	13.700	12.533	76.165
22	(Ukraine) Vladyslav Hryko	11.333	11.600	12.300	13.066	13.166	13.166	74.631
23	(Egypt) Omar Mohamed	10.166	11.666	13.033	12.066	13.600	12.833	73.364
24	(Iceland) Dagur Kári Ólafsson	11.433	12.133	11.500	13.300	13.633	11.333	73.332

=== Floor ===
Rank	Gymnast	D Score	E Score	Pen.	Bon.	Total
1st place, gold medalist(s)	(United Kingdom) Jake Jarman	6.300	8.666	-0.10		14.866
2nd place, silver medalist(s)	(United Kingdom) Luke Whitehouse	6.100	8.566			14.666
3rd place, bronze medalist(s)	(Philippines) Carlos Yulo	5.900	8.633			14.533
4	(United States) Kameron Nelson	6.300	7.933	-0.10		14.133
5	(Thailand) Tikumporn Surintornta	5.500	8.500	-0.30		13.700
6	(Kazakhstan) Milad Karimi	5.100	8.400		0.10	13.600
7	(Hungary) Krisztofer Mészáros	5.600	7.766	-0.10		13.266
8	(Japan) Kazuki Minami	5.600	7.133	-0.20		12.533

=== Pommel horse ===
Rank	Gymnast	D Score	E Score	Pen.	Total
1st place, gold medalist(s)	(China) Hong Yanming	5.600	9.000		14.600
2nd place, silver medalist(s)	(Armenia) Mamikon Khachatryan	5.800	8.800		14.600
3rd place, bronze medalist(s)	(United States) Patrick Hoopes	6.000	8.566		14.566
4	(Armenia) Hamlet Manukyan	5.800	8.633		14.433
5	(United Kingdom) Alexander Yolshin-Cash	5.800	8.633		14.366
6	(Kazakhstan) Zeinolla Idrissov	5.500	8.166		13.666
7	(Kazakhstan) Nariman Kurbanov	6.000	7.533		13.533
8	(Canada) Aidan Li	5.200	7.166		12.366

=== Rings ===
Rank	Gymnast	D Score	E Score	Pen.	Bon.	Total
1st place, gold medalist(s)	(United States) Donnell Whittenburg	6.000	8.700			14.700
2nd place, silver medalist(s)	(Turkey) Adem Asil	5.700	8.866			14.566
3rd place, bronze medalist(s)	(China) Lan Xingyu	5.900	8.600			14.500
4	(China) Zhang Boheng	5.500	8.966			14.466
5	(Greece) Eleftherios Petrounias	5.700	8.600			14.300
6	(Brazil) Caio Souza	5.700	8.466			14.166
7	(Belgium) Glen Cuyle	5.800	8.133			13.933
8	(United Kingdom) Harry Hepworth	5.800	7.566			13.366

=== Vault ===
Rank	Gymnast	Vault 1					Vault 2					Total
Rank	Gymnast	D Score	E Score	Pen.	Bon.	Score 1	D Score	E Score	Pen.	Bon.	Score 2	Total
1st place, gold medalist(s)	(Philippines) Carlos Yulo	5.6	9.500		0.1	15.200	5.2	9.333			14.533	14.866
2nd place, silver medalist(s)	(Armenia) Artur Davtyan	5.2	9.500		0.1	14.800	5.2	9.566		0.1	14.866	14.833
3rd place, bronze medalist(s)	(Ukraine) Nazar Chepurnyi	5.2	9.266			14.466	5.2	9.300			14.500	14.483
4	(Italy) Tommaso Brugnami	5.2	9.166			14.366	5.2	9.266		0.1	14.566	14.466
5	(China) Huang Mingqi	5.2	9.166			14.366	5.2	9.266			14.466	14.416
6	(Individual Neutral Athletes) Mukhammadzhon Iakubov	5.2	9.100			14.300	5.2	8.866			14.066	14.183
7	(Individual Neutral Athletes) Daniel Marinov	5.2	9.100			14.300	5.2	8.800			14.000	14.150
8	(Japan) Kazuki Minami	5.2	7.933			13.133	4.8	9.466		0.1	14.366	13.749

=== Parallel bars ===
Rank	Gymnast	D Score	E Score	Pen.	Bon.	Total
1st place, gold medalist(s)	(China) Zou Jingyuan	6.000	9.300			15.300
2nd place, silver medalist(s)	(Japan) Tomoharu Tsunogai	5.800	8.700			14.500
3rd place, bronze medalist(s)	(Individual Neutral Athletes) Daniel Marinov	5.900	8.566			14.466
4	(Colombia) Ángel Barajas	6.100	8.266			14.366
5	(United States) Donnell Whittenburg	5.800	8.433			14.233
6	(Individual Neutral Athletes) Vladislav Polyashov	5.400	8.466		0.10	13.966
7	(Japan) Shinnosuke Oka	5.300	8.000			13.300
8	(China) Shi Cong	5.300	7.800			13.100

=== Horizontal bar ===
Rank	Gymnast	D Score	E Score	Pen.	Bon.	Total
1	(United States) Brody Malone	6.400	8.533			14.933
2	(Japan) Daiki Hashimoto	6.200	8.533			14.733
3	(United Kingdom) Joe Fraser	6.300	8.400			14.700
4	(Japan) Tomoharu Tsunogai	6.100	8.500			14.600
5	(Kazakhstan) Milad Karimi	6.000	8.366			14.366
6	(Italy) Carlo Macchini	6.100	8.166			14.266
7	(China) Shi Cong	5.500	7.500		0.10	13.100
8	(Individual Neutral Athletes) Daniel Marinov	4.800	7.766			12.566

== Women's results ==
=== Individual all-around ===
Rank	Gymnast	Vault (gymnastics)	Uneven bars	Balance beam	Floor (gymnastics)	Total
1st place, gold medalist(s)	(Individual Neutral Athletes) Angelina Melnikova	14.100	14.700	12.800	13.466	55.066
2nd place, silver medalist(s)	(United States) Leanne Wong	14.466	13.800	13.500	13.200	54.966
3rd place, bronze medalist(s)	(China) Zhang Qingying	13.000	13.900	14.833	12.900	54.633
4	(Algeria) Kaylia Nemour	13.466	15.166	13.066	12.866	54.564
5	(Italy) Asia D'Amato	13.966	13.866	12.900	12.800	53.532
6	(Japan) Rina Kishi	13.966	13.033	13.433	12.800	53.232
7	(Japan) Aiko Sugihara	13.900	12.200	13.366	13.666	53.132
8	(United Kingdom) Abigail Martin	13.866	13.466	12.400	13.266	52.998
9	(Netherlands) Naomi Visser	13.100	14.200	12.233	12.766	52.299
10	(United Kingdom) Ruby Evans	14.033	12.800	12.033	13.200	52.066
11	(Individual Neutral Athletes) Liudmila Roshchina	13.800	13.833	11.733	12.633	51.999
12	(Australia) Breanna Scott	13.133	12.666	13.566	12.433	51.798
13	(United States) Dulcy Caylor	13.966	12.233	11.900	13.433	51.532
14	(Spain) Alba Petisco	13.500	13.466	12.200	12.233	51.399
15	(Finland) Kaia Tanskanen	13.100	12.400	12.500	13.266	51.266
16	(Switzerland) Lena Bickel	13.066	13.466	11.866	12.666	51.064
17	(Mexico) Natalia Escalera	13.500	12.933	11.633	12.966	51.032
18	(Hungary) Gréta Mayer	13.500	11.533	12.933	12.700	50.666
19	(Germany) Karina Schönmaier	13.566	13.200	11.900	11.900	50.566
20	(Slovenia) Lucija Hribar	13.100	13.166	12.300	11.933	50.499
21	(Germany) Silja Stöhr	12.966	12.066	12.700	12.533	50.265
22	(Spain) Laia Font	13.766	12.533	11.800	12.133	50.232
23	(Czech Republic) Soňa Artamonova	12.900	11.466	10.866	12.433	47.665
–	(Hungary) Zója Székely	10.500	–	–	11.500	DNF

=== Vault ===
Position	Gymnast	Vault 1				Vault 2				Bonus	Total
Position	Gymnast	D Score	E Score	Pen.	Score 1	D Score	E Score	Pen.	Score 2	Bonus	Total
1st place, gold medalist(s)	(Individual Neutral Athletes) Angelina Melnikova	5.000	9.100		14.100	5.600	8.833		14.433	0.2	14.466
2nd place, silver medalist(s)	(Canada) Lia Monica Fontaine	5.000	8.933		13.933	4.800	8.933		13.733	0.2	14.033
3rd place, bronze medalist(s)	(United States) Joscelyn Roberson	5.200	8.766		13.966	5.000	8.600		13.600	0.2	13.983
4	(Belgium) Lisa Vaelen	5.400	8.700		14.100	4.400	8.833		13.233	0.2	13.866
5	(Germany) Karina Schönmaier	5.600	8.933	-2.0	12.533	5.000	9.033		14.033	0.2	13.483
6	(Individual Neutral Athletes) Anna Kalmykova	5.400	7.566	-0.1	12.866	4.600	8.933		13.533		13.199
7	(Austria) Charlize Mörz	3.800	8.900		12.700	4.400	8.766		13.166	0.2	13.133
DNS	(China) Deng Yalan	–	–		–	–	–		–		DNS

=== Uneven bars ===
Rank	Gymnast	D Score	E Score	Pen.	Total
1st place, gold medalist(s)	(Algeria) Kaylia Nemour	7.100	8.466		15.566
2nd place, silver medalist(s)	(Individual Neutral Athletes) Angelina Melnikova	6.300	8.200		14.500
3rd place, bronze medalist(s)	(China) Yang Fanyuwei	6.700	7.800		14.500
4	(United States) Skye Blakely	6.200	8.133		14.333
5	(Australia) Kate McDonald	6.000	8.166		14.166
6	(Individual Neutral Athletes) Leila Vasileva	6.200	7.866		14.066
6	(Netherlands) Naomi Visser	6.200	7.866		14.066
8	(Hungary) Zója Székely	5.800	6.633		12.433

=== Balance beam ===
Rank	Gymnast	D Score	E Score	Pen.	Total
1st place, gold medalist(s)	(China) Zhang Qingying	6.900	8.266		15.166
2nd place, silver medalist(s)	(Algeria) Kaylia Nemour	6.200	8.100		14.300
3rd place, bronze medalist(s)	(Japan) Aiko Sugihara	6.000	8.166		14.166
4	(Brazil) Flávia Saraiva	5.700	8.200		13.900
5	(Canada) Ellie Black	5.800	7.800		13.600
6	(Singapore) Amanda Yap	5.400	7.933		13.333
7	(Romania) Sabrina Voinea	5.800	6.733		12.533
8	(United States) Dulcy Caylor	5.000	6.900	-0.10	11.800

=== Floor ===
Rank	Gymnast	D Score	E Score	Pen.	Total
1st place, gold medalist(s)	(Japan) Aiko Sugihara	5.800	8.033		13.833
2nd place, silver medalist(s)	(United Kingdom) Ruby Evans	5.900	7.766		13.666
3rd place, bronze medalist(s)	(United Kingdom) Abigail Martin	5.800	7.666		13.466
4	(Romania) Sabrina Voinea	5.900	7.566		13.466
5	(Japan) Rina Kishi	5.800	7.233		13.033
6	(United States) Dulcy Caylor	5.600	7.366		12.966
7	(Romania) Denisa Golgotă	4.900	7.333		12.233
8	(Italy) Giulia Perotti	4.900	6.733		11.633

== Qualification ==
=== Men's results ===
==== Individual all-around ====
Rank	Gymnast	Floor (gymnastics)	Pommel horse	Rings (gymnastics)	Vault (gymnastics)	Parallel bars	Horizontal bar	Total	Qual.
1	(Japan) Daiki Hashimoto	12.300	14.133	13.433	14.533	14.266	14.400	83.065	Q
2	(Switzerland) Noe Seifert	13.633	14.000	13.200	13.600	14.066	14.000	82.499	Q
3	(China) Zhang Boheng	13.566	13.233	14.600	14.333	14.266	12.333	82.331	Q
4	(Individual Neutral Athletes) Daniel Marinov	13.400	13.333	12.466	14.400	14.200	14.133	81.932	Q
5	(China) Shi Cong	13.333	13.366	13.800	12.366	14.400	14.133	81.398	Q
6	(Colombia) Ángel Barajas	13.266	12.566	12.866	13.566	14.300	14.100	80.664	Q
7	(Switzerland) Florian Langenegger	13.700	13.233	12.366	13.933	13.766	13.300	80.298	Q
8	(Brazil) Caio Souza	13.100	11.000	14.333	13.300	13.700	13.733	79.166	Q
9	(South Korea) Ryu Sung-hyun	13.700	13.200	12.600	12.900	13.733	12.733	78.866	Q
10	(Brazil) Diogo Soares	13.533	13.133	12.400	12.500	13.366	13.866	78.798	Q
11	(Finland) Robert Kirmes	12.966	12.800	13.033	13.466	13.333	13.200	78.798	Q
12	(Japan) Shinnosuke Oka	10.300	13.133	13.566	13.933	14.533	13.266	78.731	Q
13	(Germany) Timo Eder	13.433	12.166	12.500	14.033	13.100	13.033	78.265	Q
14	(Spain) Thierno Diallo	12.600	13.100	12.566	13.500	13.566	12.700	78.032	Q
15	(Hungary) Krisztofer Mészáros	13.966	12.233	12.900	12.400	14.100	12.100	77.699	Q
16	(France) Anthony Mansard	12.600	12.433	12.200	13.633	13.566	13.000	77.432	Q
17	(Spain) Joel Plata	11.566	13.300	12.833	12.700	13.800	13.166	77.365	Q
18	(Finland) Akseli Karsikas	13.566	12.600	12.833	13.900	11.600	12.366	76.865	Q
19	(Australia) Jesse Moore	12.100	12.400	12.233	13.833	13.833	12.333	76.732	Q
20	(Canada) Félix Dolci	13.033	9.800	12.866	13.500	13.600	13.833	76.632	Q
21	(Ukraine) Vladyslav Hryko	12.200	11.700	12.333	13.000	13.333	13.366	75.932	Q
22	(Norway) Sebastian Sponevik	12.800	10.866	12.600	14.200	13.066	12.366	75.898	Q
23	(Egypt) Omar Mohamed	12.966	11.466	13.433	12.466	12.000	13.200	75.531	Q
24	(Iceland) Dagur Kári Ólafsson	12.733	13.466	11.433	13.300	12.433	11.900	75.365	Q
25	(Hungary) Benedek Tomcsányi	12.666	11.800	12.733	13.300	12.300	12.500	75.299	R1
26	(Germany) Nils Dunkel	11.666	12.433	12.500	13.200	12.966	12.333	75.098	R2
27	(Belgium) Victor Martinez	12.500	11.500	12.266	13.500	11.933	13.066	74.765	R3
28	(Netherlands) Casimir Schmidt	10.266	11.666	13.366	13.666	13.033	12.466	74.463	R4

==== Floor ====
Rank	Gymnast	D Score	E Score	Pen.	Bon.	Total	Qual.
1	(United Kingdom) Jake Jarman	6.300	8.400			14.700	Q
2	(Philippines) Carlos Yulo	5.900	8.666			14.566	Q
3	(United States) Kameron Nelson	6.300	8.100	-0.10		14.300	Q
4	(Kazakhstan) Milad Karimi	5.700	8.433			14.133	Q
5	(Japan) Kazuki Minami	5.700	8.400			14.100	Q
6	(Hungary) Krisztofer Mészáros	5.500	8.466			13.966	Q
7	(Thailand) Tikumporn Surintornta	5.500	8.366			13.866	Q
8	(United Kingdom) Luke Whitehouse	6.100	7.866	-0.10		13.866	Q
9	(Switzerland) Florian Langenegger	5.000	8.600		0.10	13.700	R1
10	(South Korea) Ryu Sung-hyun	5.500	8.200			13.700	R2
11	(Bulgaria) Kevin Penev	5.400	8.266			13.666	R3

==== Pommel horse ====
Rank	Gymnast	D Score	E Score	Pen.	Total	Qual.
1	(Kazakhstan) Nariman Kurbanov	6.000	8.700		14.700	Q
2	(China) Hong Yanming	5.600	9.000		14.600	Q
3	(United States) Patrick Hoopes	6.000	8.566		14.566	Q
4	(Armenia) Hamlet Manukyan	5.600	8.900		14.500	Q
5	(Canada) Aidan Li	5.600	8.800		14.400	Q
6	(Armenia) Mamikon Khachatryan	5.800	8.600		14.400	Q
7	(United Kingdom) Alexander Yolshin-Cash	5.800	8.533		14.333	Q
8	(Kazakhstan) Zeinolla Idrissov	5.700	8.600		14.300	Q
9	(Italy) Gabriele Targhetta	6.000	8.266		14.266	R1
10	(Slovenia) Gregor Rakovič	5.500	8.733		14.233	R2
11	(Japan) Daiki Hashimoto	5.700	8.433		14.133	R3

==== Rings ====
Rank	Gymnast	D Score	E Score	Pen.	Bon.	Total	Qual.
1	(China) Lan Xingyu	5.900	8.866			14.766	Q
2	(United States) Donnell Whittenburg	6.000	8.700			14.700	Q
3	(China) Zhang Boheng	5.500	9.100			14.600	Q
4	(Turkey) Adem Asil	5.700	8.766			14.466	Q
5	(Greece) Eleftherios Petrounias	5.700	8.666			14.366	Q
6	(United Kingdom) Harry Hepworth	5.800	8.566			14.366	Q
7	(Belgium) Glen Cuyle	5.800	8.533			14.333	Q
8	(Brazil) Caio Souza	5.700	8.533		0.10	14.333	Q
9	(United Kingdom) Courtney Tulloch	5.800	8.466			14.266	R1
10	(Japan) Kiichi Kaneta	5.500	8.700			14.200	R2
11	(Armenia) Artur Avetisyan	5.600	8.600			14.200	R3

==== Vault ====
Rank	Gymnast	Vault 1					Vault 2					Total	Qual.
Rank	Gymnast	D Score	E Score	Pen.	Bon.	Score 1	D Score	E Score	Pen.	Bon.	Score 2	Total	Qual.
1	(Philippines) Carlos Yulo	5.600	9.300			14.900	5.200	9.400			14.600	14.750	Q
2	(Armenia) Artur Davtyan	5.200	9.233			14.433	5.200	9.500			14.700	14.566	Q
3	(Ukraine) Nazar Chepurnyi	5.200	9.033			14.233	5.200	9.300	-0.10		14.400	14.316	Q
4	(Individual Neutral Athletes) Daniel Marinov	5.200	9.200			14.400	5.200	8.933			14.133	14.266	Q
5	(Italy) Tommaso Brugnami	5.200	9.166	-0.10		14.266	5.200	9.033			14.233	14.249	Q
6	(China) Huang Mingqi	5.200	9.533		0.10	14.833	5.200	8.333			13.533	14.183	Q
7	(Japan) Kazuki Minami	4.800	9.400	-0.10	0.10	14.200	4.800	9.100			13.900	14.050	Q
8	(Individual Neutral Athletes) Mukhammadzhon Iakubov	5.200	8.666	-0.30		13.566	5.200	9.200		0.10	14.500	14.033	Q
9	(Czech Republic) Ondřej Kalný	5.200	9.066	-0.10		14.166	4.800	8.900			13.700	13.933	R1
10	(Norway) Sebastian Sponevik	5.200	9.000			14.200	4.800	8.933	-0.10		13.633	13.916	R2
11	(United Kingdom) Jake Jarman	5.600	8.200	-0.30		13.500	5.200	9.100	-0.10		14.200	13.850	R3

==== Parallel bars ====
Rank	Gymnast	D Score	E Score	Pen.	Bon.	Total	Qual.
1	(China) Zou Jingyuan	6.000	9.366			15.466	Q
2	(Japan) Shinnosuke Oka	5.600	8.933			14.533	Q
3	(Japan) Tomoharu Tsunogai	5.700	8.800			14.500	Q
4	(China) Shi Cong	5.800	8.600			14.400	Q
5	(Colombia) Ángel Barajas	5.900	8.400			14.300	Q
6	(United States) Donnell Whittenburg	5.800	8.400		0.10	14.300	Q
7	(China) Zhang Boheng	5.600	8.666			14.266	–
7	(Japan) Daiki Hashimoto	5.600	8.666			14.266	–
9	(Individual Neutral Athletes) Vladislav Poliashov	5.400	8.733		0.10	14.233	Q
10	(Individual Neutral Athletes) Daniel Marinov	5.700	8.500			14.200	Q
11	(Turkey) Ferhat Arıcan	5.900	8.266			14.166	R1
12	(Hungary) Krisztofer Mészáros	5.500	8.600			14.100	R2
13	(Switzerland) Noe Seifert	5.700	8.366			14.066	R3

==== Horizontal bar ====
Rank	Gymnast	D Score	E Score	Pen.	Bon.	Total	Qual.
1	(Japan) Tomoharu Tsunogai	6.200	8.600			14.800	Q
2	(United Kingdom) Joe Fraser	6.300	8.233			14.533	Q
3	(Japan) Daiki Hashimoto	6.200	8.100		0.10	14.400	Q
4	(Italy) Carlo Macchini	6.000	8.233			14.233	Q
5	(Kazakhstan) Milad Karimi	5.800	8.400			14.200	Q
6	(United States) Brody Malone	5.800	8.366			14.166	Q
7	(Individual Neutral Athletes) Daniel Marinov	5.100	8.933		0.10	14.133	Q
8	(China) Shi Cong	5.800	8.333			14.133	Q
9	(Colombia) Ángel Barajas	6.400	7.700			14.100	R1
10	(Switzerland) Noe Seifert	5.700	8.300			14.000	R2
11	(Brazil) Diogo Soares	5.500	8.366			13.866	R3

=== Women's results ===
==== Individual all-around ====
Rank	Gymnast	Vault (gymnastics)	Uneven bars	Balance beam	Floor (gymnastics)	Total	Qual.
1	(Individual Neutral Athletes) Angelina Melnikova	14.233	14.500	12.733	13.100	54.566	Q
2	(Japan) Aiko Sugihara	13.900	13.400	13.433	13.366	54.099	Q
3	(Algeria) Kaylia Nemour	12.433	15.533	13.233	12.666	53.865	Q
4	(China) Zhang Qingying	13.100	13.400	14.366	12.833	53.699	Q
5	(United States) Dulcy Caylor	14.066	12.100	13.333	13.266	52.765	Q
6	(Germany) Karina Schönmaier	14.033	13.066	12.166	12.866	52.131	Q
7	(Individual Neutral Athletes) Liudmila Roshchina	13.566	14.133	11.766	12.600	52.065	Q
8	(Japan) Rina Kishi	13.933	11.800	12.666	13.566	51.965	Q
9	(United States) Leanne Wong	11.733	13.900	13.166	13.066	51.865	Q
10	(Spain) Alba Petisco	13.166	12.933	12.366	13.200	51.665	Q
11	(United Kingdom) Ruby Evans	14.000	11.600	12.433	13.566	51.599	Q
12	(United Kingdom) Abigail Martin	13.900	12.966	11.366	13.300	51.532	Q
13	(Italy) Asia D'Amato	13.566	13.166	12.466	12.300	51.498	Q
14	(Netherlands) Naomi Visser	13.066	14.000	12.900	11.100	51.066	Q
15	(Switzerland) Lena Bickel	13.233	12.766	12.300	12.600	50.899	Q
16	(Finland) Kaia Tanskanen	13.300	12.500	11.900	13.166	50.866	Q
17	(Germany) Silja Stöhr	13.266	12.166	13.166	12.133	50.731	Q
18	(Spain) Laia Font	13.833	12.166	12.533	12.133	50.665	Q
19	(Australia) Breanna Scott	13.200	12.566	12.533	12.366	50.665	Q
20	(Hungary) Zója Székely	12.866	14.200	12.233	11.333	50.632	Q
21	(Hungary) Gréta Mayer	13.333	12.833	11.433	13.033	50.632	Q
22	(Spain) Marina Escudero	13.633	12.533	12.100	12.333	50.599	–
23	(Mexico) Natalia Escalera	13.566	13.033	11.000	12.933	50.532	Q
24	(Czech Republic) Soňa Artamonova	13.033	12.166	13.066	12.266	50.531	Q
25	(Slovenia) Lucija Hribar	13.166	13.300	11.966	12.066	50.498	Q
26	(France) Lorette Charpy	13.133	12.633	12.100	12.266	50.132	R1
27	(Czech Republic) Vanesa Mašová	12.800	13.166	11.733	12.166	49.865	R2
28	(Romania) Denisa Golgotă	13.366	10.300	12.833	13.333	49.832	R3
29	(Italy) Giulia Perotti	13.133	12.000	11.333	13.266	49.732	R4

==== Vault ====
Rank	Gymnast	Vault 1				Vault 2				Bonus	Total	Qual.
Rank	Gymnast	D Score	E Score	Pen.	Score 1	D Score	E Score	Pen.	Score 2	Bonus	Total	Qual.
1	(Individual Neutral Athletes) Angelina Melnikova	5.000	9.233		14.233	5.600	8.866	-0.10	14.366	0.20	14.499	Q
2	(China) Deng Yalan	5.400	8.700		14.100	5.200	8.800		14.000	0.20	14.250	Q
3	(Canada) Lia Monica Fontaine	5.000	9.066		14.066	4.800	8.933		13.733	0.20	14.099	Q
4	(Germany) Karina Schönmaier	5.000	9.033		14.033	4.800	8.866		13.666	0.20	14.049	Q
5	(Individual Neutral Athletes) Anna Kalmykova	5.400	8.700		14.100	4.600	8.833	-0.10	13.333	0.20	13.916	Q
6	(Belgium) Lisa Vaelen	5.400	8.600		14.000	4.400	8.833		13.233	0.20	13.816	Q
7	(Austria) Charlize Mörz	4.600	9.133		13.733	4.400	8.800		13.200	0.20	13.666	Q
8	(United States) Joscelyn Roberson	5.000	8.633		13.633	4.200	8.966		13.166	0.20	13.599	Q
9	(Romania) Sabrina Voinea	5.000	8.833		13.833	4.400	8.800		13.200		13.516	R1
10	(Vietnam) Nguyễn Thị Quỳnh Như	5.200	8.633		13.833	4.000	8.800		12.800	0.20	13.516	R2
11	(Canada) Gabrielle Black	4.600	9.000		13.600	4.400	9.000		13.400		13.500	R3

==== Uneven bars ====
Rank	Gymnast	D Score	E Score	Pen.	Total	Qual.
1	(Algeria) Kaylia Nemour	7.100	8.433		15.533	Q
2	(China) Yang Fanyuwei	6.400	8.166		14.566	Q
3	(Individual Neutral Athletes) Angelina Melnikova	6.200	8.300		14.500	Q
4	(Australia) Kate McDonald	6.000	8.200		14.200	Q
5	(Individual Neutral Athletes) Leila Vasileva	6.200	8.000		14.200	Q
6	(Hungary) Zója Székely	6.300	7.900		14.200	Q
7	(United States) Skye Blakely	6.200	7.966		14.166	Q
8	(Individual Neutral Athletes) Liudmila Roshchina	6.400	7.733		14.133	–
9	(Netherlands) Naomi Visser	6.100	7.900		14.000	Q
10	(Netherlands) Sanna Veerman	6.100	7.866		13.966	R1
11	(United States) Leanne Wong	5.700	8.200		13.900	R2
12	(Hungary) Bettina Lili Czifra	5.800	7.933		13.733	R3

==== Balance beam ====
Rank	Gymnast	D Score	E Score	Pen.	Total	Qual.
1	(China) Zhang Qingying	6.500	7.866		14.366	Q
2	(Brazil) Flávia Saraiva	5.500	8.333		13.833	Q
3	(Romania) Sabrina Voinea	6.200	7.633		13.833	Q
4	(Canada) Ellie Black	5.800	7.666		13.466	Q
5	(Japan) Aiko Sugihara	5.800	7.633		13.433	Q
6	(United States) Dulcy Caylor	5.600	7.733		13.333	Q
7	(Singapore) Amanda Yap	5.500	7.800		13.300	Q
8	(Algeria) Kaylia Nemour	6.000	7.233		13.233	Q
9	(United States) Skye Blakely	5.800	7.500	-0.1	13.200	R1
10	(United States) Leanne Wong	5.400	7.766		13.166	–
11	(Germany) Silja Stöhr	5.500	7.666		13.166	R2
12	(Czech Republic) Soňa Artamonova	5.800	7.266		13.066	R3

==== Floor ====
Rank	Gymnast	D Score	E Score	Pen.	Total	Qual.
1	(Romania) Sabrina Voinea	5.900	7.766		13.666	Q
2	(Japan) Rina Kishi	5.700	7.866		13.566	Q
3	(United Kingdom) Ruby Evans	5.900	7.666		13.566	Q
4	(Japan) Aiko Sugihara	5.700	7.666		13.366	Q
5	(Romania) Denisa Golgotă	5.600	7.733		13.333	Q
6	(United Kingdom) Abigail Martin	5.800	7.500		13.300	Q
7	(Italy) Giulia Perotti	5.400	7.866		13.266	Q
8	(United States) Dulcy Caylor	5.500	7.766		13.266	Q
9	(Spain) Alba Petisco	5.300	7.900		13.200	R1
10	(Belgium) Lisa Vaelen	5.300	7.866		13.166	R2
11	(Finland) Kaia Tanskanen	5.500	7.666		13.166	R3

== Participating nations ==
427 gymnasts (254 men, 173 women) from 75 nations participated in the World Championships in Jakarta. As is typical for a post-Olympic year world championships, there were no eligibility requirements or qualification criteria set by the FIG; any country with a valid FIG license could elect to send up to six male and four female athletes to the championships.

- AIN (14)
- Albania (1)
- Algeria (7)
- Armenia (5)
- Australia (8)
- Austria (6)
- Azerbaijan (4)
- Belgium (6)
- Brazil (9)
- Bulgaria (8)
- Canada (10)
- Cayman Islands (1)
- Chile (6)
- China (10)
- Cameroon (4)
- Colombia (4)
- Costa Rica (1)
- Croatia (9)
- Cuba (1)
- Cyprus (3)
- Czech Republic (7)
- Denmark (1)
- Egypt (5)
- Spain (9)
- Finland (9)
- France (9)
- Great Britain (10)
- Germany (7)
- Greece (4)
- Hong Kong (2)
- Hungary (8)
- Indonesia (8)
- India (9)
- Iceland (6)
- Italy (10)
- Jamaica (6)
- Jordan (2)
- Japan (10)
- Kazakhstan (7)
- South Korea (9)
- Latvia (2)
- Luxembourg (1)
- Malaysia (6)
- Mexico (9)
- Mongolia (3)
- Monaco (1)
- Namibia (2)
- Netherlands (7)
- Norway (7)
- New Zealand (9)
- Panama (3)
- Peru (5)
- Philippines (8)
- Poland (2)
- Portugal (6)
- Puerto Rico (3)
- Qatar (2)
- Romania (4)
- South Africa (5)
- Singapore (6)
- Slovenia (7)
- Serbia (1)
- Sri Lanka (3)
- Switzerland (6)
- Sweden (3)
- Syria (2)
- Thailand (3)
- Chinese Taipei (10)
- Trinidad and Tobago (2)
- Turkey (10)
- Ukraine (10)
- United States (10)
- Uzbekistan (4)
- Venezuela (3)
- Vietnam (6)

== Controversies ==
=== Delegation sizes ===
Initially, the International Gymnastics Federation (FIG) set the format that a federation may only send three athletes per gender, with a max of two individuals competing on each apparatus. However, in late 2024, the FIG reversed this decision and announced that they would go back to the previous format of individual World Championships, allowing a federation to bring up to six male gymnasts and four female gymnasts, with a max of three individuals allowed to compete on each apparatus.

=== Rejection of Israeli visas ===
Entry visas must be granted to the gymnasts/athletes and to the officials of all Member Federations. In the event that this requirement is not fulfilled, the allocation of the event would be cancelled with immediate effect by the Executive Committee.

— Art. 26.4 Assurances Concerning Visas of the 2025 Statutes of the International Gymnastics Federation

Less than two weeks before the start of the competition, Indonesia's senior minister of law, Yusril Ihza Mahendra, announced that Indonesia would reject the visas for Israeli athletes due to Indonesia's support of Palestine in the Gaza war, adding that this decision is in line with Indonesian President Prabowo Subianto's condemnation of Israel for its continued attacks on the Gaza Strip. This came after Israel's planned participation sparked intense opposition in Indonesia, according to Pramono Anung, governor of Jakarta. He cited the fact that many politicians and Muslim groups called for an Israeli ban for this competition, with Indonesian social media users objecting to the arrival of athletes from a country they claim to be committing genocide. Furthermore, Indonesia has no diplomatic ties with Israel and has refused to host Israeli sports delegations going back to 1962, when Israel and Taiwan were denied entry to compete in the 1962 Asian Games. Originally, the Indonesian Gymnastics Federation had submitted a letter to sponsor six Israeli athletes for visas, but the letter had since been withdrawn. The FIG released a short statement saying that it "recognizes the challenges that the host country has faced in organizing the event" but did not comment on its statutes requiring that visas be issued to competitors.

In response to the refusal to issue visas, the Israel Gymnastics Federation (IGF) submitted an urgent appeal to the Court of Arbitration for Sport (CAS), seeking for their athletes to be allowed to compete, or alternatively that the competition be canceled or moved to an alternative location that will issue visas to all competitors. In their appeal, the IGF argued that the FIG statutes require the FIG Executive Committee to pass a decision to move or cancel the event if entry visas are not granted to all participating delegations. On October 14, the CAS rejected the appeal for urgent provisional measures, and therefore the competition would go on as scheduled and without Israeli participation. However, the second appeal, as to whether the FIG is in breach of their statutes, will remain ongoing, but it was not heard before the start of the competition.

On 18 October 2025, the International Olympic Committee (IOC) expressed "great concern" over the decision by Indonesia to deny visas to the Israeli delegation for the Championships, emphasising that all eligible athletes must be able to participate without discrimination in line with the Olympic Charter. The IOC stated that it is the direct responsibility of the host country, event organiser and relevant sports bodies to ensure that no athlete will be excluded on discriminatory grounds. The IOC further stated that the specific situation of Indonesia would be discussed at its next Executive Board (EB) meeting.

On 22 October, the IOC released a statement stating that EB met remotely. They decided to no longer have any communications with the Indonesian Olympic Committee about hosting any Olympic events (such as the Olympic Games or the Youth Olympic Games), and they recommended international sporting federations also not allow Indonesia to host events, "until such time as the Indonesian government provides the IOC with adequate guarantees that it will allow access to the country for all participants, regardless of nationality, to attend". Additionally, the IOC adapted the Qualification Principles for the Olympic Games to ask that sporting federations demand a guarantee that all athletes are able to enter the host country of any Olympic qualifying competitions. They also asked both the Indonesian Olympic Committee and the FIG to meet with the IOC about the situation.

On October 14, 2026, World Gymnastics (formerly known as the FIG) and IGF reached a settlement, thus ending the CAS proceedings. The terms of the settlement were not made public.

== See also ==
- 1974 World Artistic Gymnastics Championships § Controversies
- 2026 World Artistic Gymnastics Championships § Controversies
