= Gianmatteo Centazzo =

Italian gymnast

- Born: 4 February 1970 (age 56) Venice, Italy

Gymnastics career
- Discipline: Men's artistic gymnastics
- Country represented: Italy
- Gym: Spes Mestre

Gianmatteo Centazzo (born 4 February 1970) is an Italian artistic gymnast. He competed at the 1992 Olympic Games.
