= Mamikon Khachatryan =

Armenian gymnast (born 2007)

- Մամիկոն Խաչատրյան
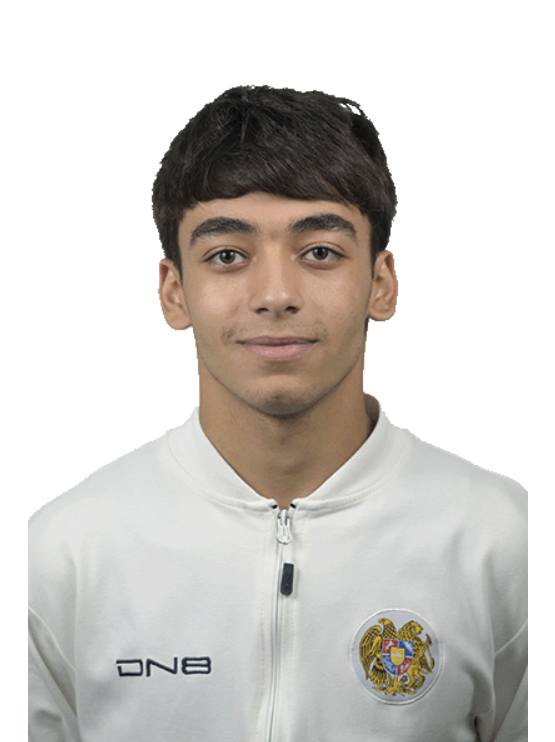

Personal information
- Full name: Mamikon Khachatryan
- Born: 18 February 2007 (age 19) Yerevan, Armenia

Gymnastics career
- Discipline: Men's artistic gymnastics
- Country represented: Armenia; (2018–present)
- Club: Armenian State Institute of Physical Culture
- Head coach: Artak Aydinyan
Medal record
Men's artistic gymnastics
Representing Armenia
World Championships
Silver medal – second place	2025 Jakarta	Pommel horse
Bronze medal – third place	2026 Rotterdam	Pommel horse
European Championships
Silver medal – second place	2025 Leipzig	Pommel horse
Bronze medal – third place	2026 Zagreb	Pommel horse
Junior World Championships
Silver medal – second place	2023 Antalya	Pommel horse
FIG World Cup
Event	1st	2nd	3rd
Apparatus World Cup	0	1	0
World Challenge Cup	1	0	0
Total	1	1	0

Mamikon Khachatryan (born 18 February 2007) is an Armenian artistic gymnast. He is the 2025 World silver medalist, 2026 World bronze medalist, 2023 Junior World silver medalist, and a two-time European medalist on pommel horse.

== Early life ==
Khachatryan was born in Armenia in 2007. He started gymnastics training at the Albert Azaryan Sports School when he was five years old because his parents wanted him to burn off excess energy.

== Gymnastics career ==
=== 2022–24 ===
Khachatryan competed at the 2022 Junior European Championships where he placed fourth on pommel horse.

In late March, Khachatryan competed at the 2023 Junior World Championships alongside Erik Baghdasaryan and Hamlet Manukyan. As a team, they finished fourth, 0.437 points behind third-place Italy. Individually, Khachatryan qualified to the pommel horse final. During apparatus event finals Khachatryan won silver on pommel horse behind compatriot Manukyan. Khachatryan next competed at the 2023 European Youth Olympic Festival alongside Manukyan and Robert Gyulumyan; together they won bronze as a team and individually Khachatryan won gold on pommel horse.

Khachatryan competed at the 2024 Junior European Championships where he won bronze on pommel horse.

=== 2025 ===
Khachatryan became age-eligible for senior-level competition in 2025. He made his senior debut at the Cottbus World Cup where he finished fourth on pommel horse. Khachatryan next competed at the World Cups in Osijek and Doha, where he finished fourth and seventh. At the 2025 European Championships Khachatryan won silver on pommel horse behind Manukyan.

Khachatryan competed at the 2025 World Championships where he won silver on pommel horse. In doing so he earned Armenia's highest placement ever on the apparatus at a World Championships, beating Harutyun Merdinyan's previous bronze medal finishes in 2015 and 2022.

=== 2026 ===
Khachatryan competed at the 2026 Cottbus World Cup where he won silver on pommel horse behind Gabriele Targhetta. Khachatryan and the rest of the Armenian delegation were scheduled to compete at the Antalya World Cup; however flight disruptions in the Middle East caused them to be unable to travel to Antalya in time for the competition. Khachatryan was able to compete at the Cairo and Osijek World Cups, where he placed fourth and sixth respectively on pommel horse.

At the 2026 European Championships, Khachatryan won bronze on pommel horse behind Targhetta and Manukyan.

At the 2026 World Championships, Khachatryan qualified to the pommel horse final in fourth place. During the final, he performed cleanly and scored 15.000 to win the bronze medal behind Manukyan and Targhetta. This was the first time two Armenians shared a podium at the World Championships.

== Competitive history ==
Competitive history of Mamikon Khachatryan at the junior level
Year	Event	Team	AA	FX	PH	SR	VT	PB	HB
2022
2022	European Championships	12			4				
2023
2023	Junior World Championships	4			2nd place, silver medalist(s)				
2023	European Youth Olympic Festival	3rd place, bronze medalist(s)	4		1st place, gold medalist(s)	8			
2023	Pharaoh's Cup			2nd place, silver medalist(s)	3rd place, bronze medalist(s)	2nd place, silver medalist(s)		2nd place, silver medalist(s)	
2024
2024	European Championships	10			3rd place, bronze medalist(s)				
2024	Voronin Cup	2nd place, silver medalist(s)	6		2nd place, silver medalist(s)				8
2024	Christmas Cup				3rd place, bronze medalist(s)				

Competitive history of Mamikon Khachatryan at the senior level
Year	Event	Team	AA	FX	PH	SR	VT	PB	HB
2025	Cottbus World Cup				4				
2025	Osijek World Cup				4				
2025	Doha World Cup				7				
2025	European Championships				2nd place, silver medalist(s)				
2025	Tashkent World Challenge Cup				1st place, gold medalist(s)				
2025	World University Games				8				
2025	World Championships	—N/a			2nd place, silver medalist(s)				
2026	Cottbus World Cup				2nd place, silver medalist(s)				
2026	Cairo World Cup				4				
2026	Osijek World Cup				6				
2026	European Championships				3rd place, bronze medalist(s)				
2026	World Championships				3rd place, bronze medalist(s)				
