= Harutyun Merdinyan =

Armenian artistic gymnast (born 1984)

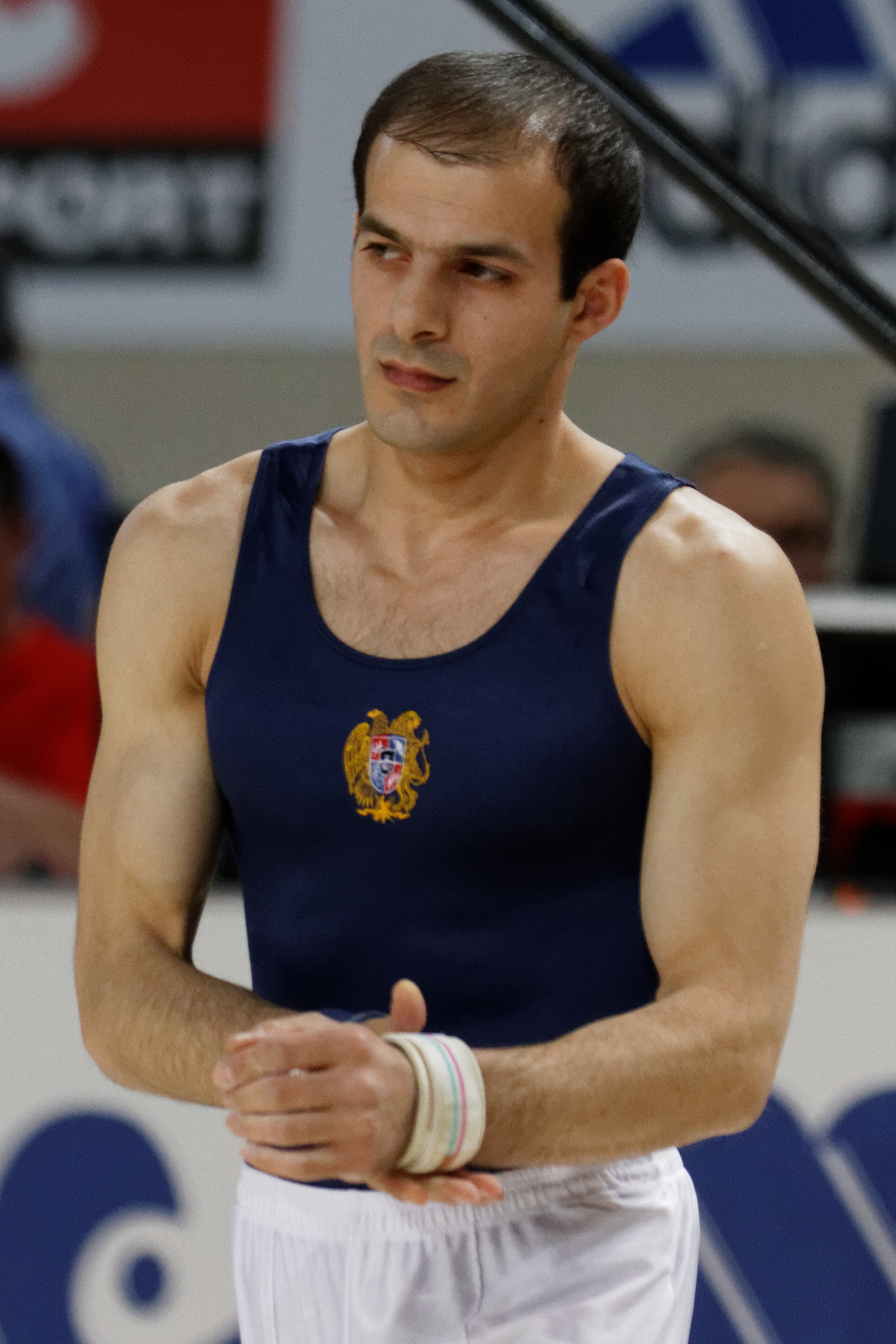

Personal information
- Full name: Harutyun Merdinyan
- Born: 16 August 1984 (age 42) Yerevan, Armenian SSR, Soviet Union
- Height: 1.70 m (5 ft 7 in)

Gymnastics career
- Discipline: Men's artistic gymnastics
- Country represented: Armenia; (1999–2024)
- Club: Albert Azaryan Olympic; Relay Sport School of Gymnastics
- Head coach: Sos Sargsyan
- Retired: November 10, 2024
Medal record
Men's artistic gymnastics
Representing Armenia
World Championships
Bronze medal – third place	2015 Glasgow	Pommel Horse
Bronze medal – third place	2022 Liverpool	Pommel Horse
European Championships
Gold medal – first place	2016 Bern	Pommel Horse
Gold medal – first place	2022 Munich	Pommel Horse
Silver medal – second place	2015 Montpellier	Pommel Horse
Bronze medal – third place	2011 Berlin	Pommel Horse
Bronze medal – third place	2012 Montpellier	Pommel Horse
Bronze medal – third place	2017 Cluj-Napoca	Pommel Horse

Harutyun Merdinyan (Armenian: Հարություն Մերդինյան; born August 16, 1984) is an Armenian former artistic gymnast. A pommel horse specialist, he is a two-time European champion from 2016 and 2022 and a two-time world championships bronze medalist from 2015 and 2022. His 2016 European gold was the first artistic gymnastics continental title for independent Armenia.

He participated at the 2015 World Artistic Gymnastics Championships in Glasgow, and qualified for the 2016 Summer Olympics, where he finished seventh in the pommel horse final after being limited by a wrist pain and fatigue.
