= Armenia at the 2018 European Championships =

- IOC code: ARM

in (United Kingdom) Glasgow (Germany) Berlin 2 August 2018 – 12 August 2018
- Competitors: 17 (16 men and 1 woman) in 4 sports
- Medals Ranked 32nd: Gold 0 Silver 0 Bronze 1 Total 1

European Championships appearances
- 2018; 2022

Armenia competed at the inaugural 7 sports 2018 European Championships from 2 to 12 August 2018. It competed in 4 sports.

== Medallists ==
Medal	Name	Sport	Event	Date
Bronze	Vladimir Harutyunyan; Lev Sargsyan	Diving	Men's 10 m synchro platform	9 August

== Aquatics ==
=== Diving ===
Men

Athlete	Event	Preliminaries		Final	
Athlete	Event	Points	Rank	Points	Rank
Vartan Bayanduryan	10 m platform	248.25	16	did not advance	
Lev Sargsyan	10 m platform	429.90	6	437.30	7
Azat Harutyunyan; Vladimir Harutyunyan	3 m synchro springboard	—N/a		335.22	8
Vladimir Harutyunyan; Lev Sargsyan	10 m synchro platform	—N/a		396.84	Bronze medal

=== Swimming ===
Men

Athlete	Event	Heats		Semifinal		Final	
Athlete	Event	Result	Rank	Result	Rank	Result	Rank
Artur Barseghyan	50 m freestyle	23.57	54	did not advance			
Artur Barseghyan	100 m freestyle	51.54	67	did not advance			
Artur Barseghyan	50 m butterfly	24.86	54	did not advance			
Ruben Gharibyan	50 m freestyle	26.07	65	did not advance			
Ruben Gharibyan	100 m freestyle	57.53	83	did not advance			
Ruben Gharibyan	50 m butterfly	27.63	64	did not advance			
Ruben Gharibyan	100 m butterfly	1:02.02	58	did not advance			
Vladimir Mamikonyan	50 m freestyle	23.87	60	did not advance			
Vladimir Mamikonyan	100 m freestyle	53.89	76	did not advance			
Vahan Mkhitaryan	50 m freestyle	23.59	55	did not advance			
Vahan Mkhitaryan	100 m freestyle	DNS		did not advance			

Women

Athlete	Event	Heats		Semifinal		Final	
Athlete	Event	Result	Rank	Result	Rank	Result	Rank
Ani Poghosyan	50 m freestyle	DNS		did not advance			
Ani Poghosyan	100 m freestyle	59.48	46	did not advance			
Ani Poghosyan	50 m backstroke	33.05	49	did not advance			
Ani Poghosyan	50 m butterfly	29.85	42	did not advance			

== Athletics ==
Men
Track and road

Athlete	Event	Heats		Semifinal		Final	
Athlete	Event	Result	Rank	Result	Rank	Result	Rank
Yervand Mkrtchyan	3000 m steeplechase	8:50.35 PB	24	—N/a		did not advance	

Field events

Athletes	Event	Qualification		Final	
Athletes	Event	Distance	Position	Distance	Position
Levon Aghasyan	Triple jump	16.34	14	did not advance	

== Cycling ==
=== Track ===
Omnium

Athlete	Event	Scratch Race		Tempo Race		Elimination Race		Points Race		Total points	Rank
Athlete	Event	Rank	Points	Rank	Points	Rank	Points	Rank	Points	Total points	Rank
Edgar Stepanyan	Men's omnium	18	6	17	8	20	2	18	-19	18	-3

Points race

Athlete	Event	Total points	Rank
Edgar Stepanyan	Men's points race	49	8

Scratch

Athlete	Event	Laps down	Rank
Edgar Stepanyan	Men's scratch	0	19

== Gymnastics ==
=== Men ===
Team

Athlete	Event	Qualification								Final							
Athlete	Event	Apparatus						Total	Rank	Apparatus						Total	Rank
Athlete	Event	F	PH	R	V	PB	HB	Total	Rank	F	PH	R	V	PB	HB	Total	Rank
Artur Davtyan	Team	11.233	14.500	12.933	12.833	13.700	10.866	—N/a									
Harutyun Merdinyan	Team	—N/a	13.433	—N/a		11.300	—N/a	—N/a									
Vigen Khachatryan	Team	13.300	12.500	—N/a	13.900	12.633	12.100	—N/a									
Artur Tovmasyan	Team	—N/a		14.333	—N/a		10.133	—N/a									
Vahagn Davtyan	Team	12.466	—N/a	14.833 Q	13.000	—N/a		—N/a									
Total	Team	36.999	40.433	42.099	39.733	37.633	33.099	229.996	18	—N/a							

Individual finals

Athlete	Event	Apparatus						Rank
Athlete	Event	F	PH	R	V	PB	HB	Rank
Vahagn Davtyan	Rings	—N/a		14.566	—N/a			5
