= Armenia at the 2025 World Aquatics Championships =

- Flag of Armenia
- World Aquatics code: ARM
- National federation: Armenian Swimming Federation

in Singapore
- Competitors: 8 in 3 sports
- Medals: Gold 0 Silver 0 Bronze 0 Total 0

World Aquatics Championships appearances
- 1994; 1998; 2001; 2003; 2005; 2007; 2009; 2011; 2013; 2015; 2017; 2019; 2022; 2023; 2024; 2025

Other related appearances
- Soviet Union (1973–1991)

Armenia is competing at the 2025 World Aquatics Championships in Singapore from 11 July to 3 August 2025.

== Competitors ==
The following is the list of competitors in the Championships.

Sport	Men	Women	Total
Diving	1	2	3
High diving	1	0	1
Swimming	2	2	4
Total	4	4	8

== Diving ==
Men

Athlete	Event	Preliminary		Semifinal		Final	
Athlete	Event	Points	Rank	Points	Rank	Points	Rank
Vartan Bayanduryan	10 m platform	305.20	40	Did not advance			

Women

Athlete	Event	Preliminary		Semifinal		Final	
Athlete	Event	Points	Rank	Points	Rank	Points	Rank
Aleksandra Bibikina	1 m springboard	242.15	12 Q	—		251.45	10
Aleksandra Bibikina	3 m springboard	291.30	8 Q	239.10	17	Did not advance	
Alisa Zakaryan	10 m platform	145.60	36	Did not advance			

Mixed

Athlete	Event	Final	
Athlete	Event	Points	Rank
Vartan Bayanduryan; Aleksandra Bibikina	3 m synchronized springboard	220.32	17
Vartan Bayanduryan; Aleksandra Bibikina; Alisa Zakaryan	Team	244.25	19

== High diving ==
Men

Athlete	Event	Points	Rank
Nikita Fedotov	Men's high diving	226.10	20

== Swimming ==
Men

Athlete	Event	Heat		Semifinal		Final	
Athlete	Event	Time	Rank	Time	Rank	Time	Rank
Levon Kocharyan	50 m freestyle	24.42	76	Did not advance			
Levon Kocharyan	100 m freestyle	52.21	64	Did not advance			
Ashot Chakhoyan	50 m breaststroke	29.12	60	Did not advance			
Ashot Chakhoyan	100 m breaststroke	DSQ		Did not advance			

Women

Athlete	Event	Heat		Semifinal		Final	
Athlete	Event	Time	Rank	Time	Rank	Time	Rank
Yeva Karapetyan	100 m freestyle	1:01.21	60	Did not advance			
Yeva Karapetyan	50 m butterfly	28.66	53	Did not advance			
Varsenik Manucharyan	50 m freestyle	26.92	51	Did not advance			
Varsenik Manucharyan	100 m butterfly	1:01.68	40	Did not advance			

Mixed

Athlete	Event	Heat		Final	
Athlete	Event	Time	Rank	Time	Rank
Ashot Chakhoyan; Yeva Karapetyan; Levon Kocharyan; Varsenik Manucharyan	4 × 100 m freestyle relay	3:46.78	24	Did not advance	
Ashot Chakhoyan; Yeva Karapetyan; Levon Kocharyan; Varsenik Manucharyan	4 × 100 m medley relay	4:06.45	26	Did not advance	
