= Armenia at the 2015 World Aquatics Championships =

- Flag of Armenia
- FINA code: ARM
- National federation: Armenian Swimming Federation

in Kazan, Russia
- Competitors: 6 in 2 sports
- Medals: Gold 0 Silver 0 Bronze 0 Total 0

World Aquatics Championships appearances
- 1994; 1998; 2001; 2003; 2005; 2007; 2009; 2011; 2013; 2015; 2017; 2019; 2022; 2023; 2024

Other related appearances
- Soviet Union (1973–1991)

Armenia competed at the 2015 World Aquatics Championships in Kazan, Russia from 24 July to 9 August 2015.

== Diving ==
Armenian divers qualified for the individual spots and the synchronized teams at the World Championships.

Men

Athlete	Event	Preliminaries		Semifinals		Final	
Athlete	Event	Points	Rank	Points	Rank	Points	Rank
Vladimir Harutyunyan	10 m platform	313.45	42	did not advance			
Lev Sargsyan	10 m platform	374.10	29	did not advance			

== Swimming ==
Armenian swimmers have achieved qualifying standards in the following events (up to a maximum of 2 swimmers in each event at the A-standard entry time, and 1 at the B-standard):

Men

Athlete	Event	Heat		Semifinal		Final	
Athlete	Event	Time	Rank	Time	Rank	Time	Rank
Vladimir Mamikonyan	100 m freestyle	55.12	92	did not advance			
Vahan Mkhitaryan	50 m freestyle	23.36	44	did not advance			
Vahan Mkhitaryan	50 m butterfly	26.19	54	did not advance			

Women

Athlete	Event	Heat		Semifinal		Final	
Athlete	Event	Time	Rank	Time	Rank	Time	Rank
Ani Poghosyan	200 m freestyle	2:16.22	59	did not advance			
Ani Poghosyan	100 m backstroke	1:10.82	61	did not advance			
Monika Vasilyan	50 m freestyle	27.63	64	did not advance			
Monika Vasilyan	100 m freestyle	1:01.07	74	did not advance			

Mixed

Athlete	Event	Heat		Final	
Athlete	Event	Time	Rank	Time	Rank
Vahan Mkhitaryan; Monika Vasilyan; Ani Poghosyan; Vladimir Mamikonyan	4×100 m freestyle relay	3:52.96	25	did not advance	
