= Armenia at the 2019 World Aquatics Championships =

- Flag of Armenia
- World Aquatics code: ARM
- National federation: Armenian Swimming Federation

in Gwangju, South Korea
- Medals: Gold 0 Silver 0 Bronze 0 Total 0

World Aquatics Championships appearances
- 1994; 1998; 2001; 2003; 2005; 2007; 2009; 2011; 2013; 2015; 2017; 2019; 2022; 2023; 2024; 2025

Other related appearances
- Soviet Union (1973–1991)

Armenia competed at the 2019 World Aquatics Championships in Gwangju, South Korea from 12 to 28 July.

== Diving ==
Armenia entered two divers.

Men

Athlete	Event	Preliminaries		Semifinals		Final	
Athlete	Event	Points	Rank	Points	Rank	Points	Rank
Vladimir Harutyunyan	10 m platform	318.70	35	did not advance			
Lev Sargsyan	10 m platform	296.10	39	did not advance			
Vladimir Harutyunyan; Lev Sargsyan	Synchronized 10 m platform	336.48	12 Q	—N/a		372.48	9

== Swimming ==
Armenia entered four swimmers.

Men

Athlete	Event	Heat		Semifinal		Final	
Athlete	Event	Time	Rank	Time	Rank	Time	Rank
Artur Barseghyan	100 m freestyle	50.26	48	did not advance			
Artur Barseghyan	100 m butterfly	56.52	56	did not advance			
Vahan Mkhitaryan	50 m freestyle	23.62	65	did not advance			
Vahan Mkhitaryan	50 m butterfly	26.06	67	did not advance			

Women

Athlete	Event	Heat		Semifinal		Final	
Athlete	Event	Time	Rank	Time	Rank	Time	Rank
Varsenik Manucharyan	50 m freestyle	27.54	56	did not advance			
Varsenik Manucharyan	50 m butterfly	29.65	43	did not advance			
Ani Poghosyan	100 m freestyle	59.89	61	did not advance			
Ani Poghosyan	200 m freestyle	2:09.09	43	did not advance			

Mixed

Athlete	Event	Heat		Final	
Athlete	Event	Time	Rank	Time	Rank
Artur Barseghyan; Vahan Mkhitaryan; Ani Poghosyan; Varsenik Manucharyan	4×100 m freestyle relay	3:44.07	22	did not advance	
Ani Poghosyan; Varsenik Manucharyan; Artur Barseghyan; Vahan Mkhitaryan	4×100 m medley relay	4:19.80	30	did not advance	
