= Armenia at the 2017 World Aquatics Championships =

- Flag of Armenia
- FINA code: ARM
- National federation: Armenian Swimming Federation

in Budapest, Hungary
- Competitors: 7 in 2 sports
- Medals: Gold 0 Silver 0 Bronze 0 Total 0

World Aquatics Championships appearances
- 1994; 1998; 2001; 2003; 2005; 2007; 2009; 2011; 2013; 2015; 2017; 2019; 2022; 2023; 2024

Other related appearances
- Soviet Union (1973–1991)

Armenia competed at the 2017 World Aquatics Championships in Budapest, Hungary from 14 to 30 July.

== Diving ==
Armenia has entered 3 divers (three male).

Athlete	Event	Preliminaries		Semifinals		Final	
Athlete	Event	Points	Rank	Points	Rank	Points	Rank
Vartan Bayanduryan	Men's 10 m platform	280.90	41	did not advance			
Vladimir Harutyunyan	Men's 10 m platform	375.50	22	did not advance			
Vladimir Harutyunyan; Lev Sargsyan	Men's 10 m synchronized platform	368.40	11 Q	—		385.20	9

== Swimming ==
Armenia has received a Universality invitation from FINA to send a maximum of four swimmers (two men and two women) to the World Championships.

Athlete	Event	Heat		Semifinal		Final	
Athlete	Event	Time	Rank	Time	Rank	Time	Rank
Vladimir Mamikonyan	Men's 100 m freestyle	54.26	82	did not advance			
Vahan Mkhitaryan	Men's 50 m freestyle	23.84	=74	did not advance			
Vahan Mkhitaryan	Men's 50 m butterfly	26.44	64	did not advance			
Ani Poghosyan	Women's 50 m freestyle	27.46	51	did not advance			
Ani Poghosyan	Women's 100 m freestyle	59.27	52	did not advance			
Elen Yesayan	Women's 50 m breaststroke	38.67	46	did not advance			
Elen Yesayan	Women's 100 m breaststroke	1:21.84	50	did not advance			
