= Armenia at the 2024 World Aquatics Championships =

- Flag of Armenia
- FINA code: ARM
- National federation: Armenian Swimming Federation

in Doha, Qatar
- Competitors: 7 in 2 sports
- Medals: Gold 0 Silver 0 Bronze 0 Total 0

World Aquatics Championships appearances
- 1994; 1998; 2001; 2003; 2005; 2007; 2009; 2011; 2013; 2015; 2017; 2019; 2022; 2023; 2024

Other related appearances
- Soviet Union (1973–1991)

Armenia competed at the 2024 World Aquatics Championships in Doha, Qatar from 2 to 18 February.

== Competitors ==
The following is the list of competitors in the Championships.

Sport	Men	Women	Total
Diving	2	1	3
Swimming	2	2	4
Total	4	3	7

== Diving ==
Men

Athlete	Event	Preliminaries		Semifinal		Final	
Athlete	Event	Points	Rank	Points	Rank	Points	Rank
Arman Enokyan; Marat Grigoryan	10 m synchronized platform	—				225.12	21

Women

Athlete	Event	Preliminaries		Semifinal		Final	
Athlete	Event	Points	Rank	Points	Rank	Points	Rank
Alisa Zakaryan	10 m platform	129.70	46	Did not advance			

== Swimming ==
Armenia entered 4 swimmers.

Men

Athlete	Event	Heat		Semifinal		Final	
Athlete	Event	Time	Rank	Time	Rank	Time	Rank
Artur Barseghyan	100 metre freestyle	50.19	35	Did not advance			
Artur Barseghyan	100 metre butterfly	54.22	36	Did not advance			
Ashot Chakhoyan	50 metre breaststroke	29.38	44	Did not advance			
Ashot Chakhoyan	100 metre breaststroke	1:04.92	58	Did not advance			

Women

Athlete	Event	Heat		Semifinal		Final	
Athlete	Event	Time	Rank	Time	Rank	Time	Rank
Varsenik Manucharyan	50 metre freestyle	27.58	60	Did not advance			
Varsenik Manucharyan	100 metre butterfly	1:02.59	31	Did not advance			
Ani Poghosyan	100 metre freestyle	59.43	42	Did not advance			
Ani Poghosyan	200 metre freestyle	2:10.55	41	Did not advance			

Mixed

Athlete	Event	Heat		Final	
Athlete	Event	Time	Rank	Time	Rank
Artur Barseghyan; Ashot Chakhoyan; Varsenik Manucharyan; Ani Poghosyan	4 × 100 m freestyle relay	3:44.29	13	Did not advance	
Artur Barseghyan; Ashot Chakhoyan; Varsenik Manucharyan; Ani Poghosyan	4 × 100 m medley relay	4:08.59 NR	25	Did not advance	
