= List of Olympic male artistic gymnasts for Armenia =

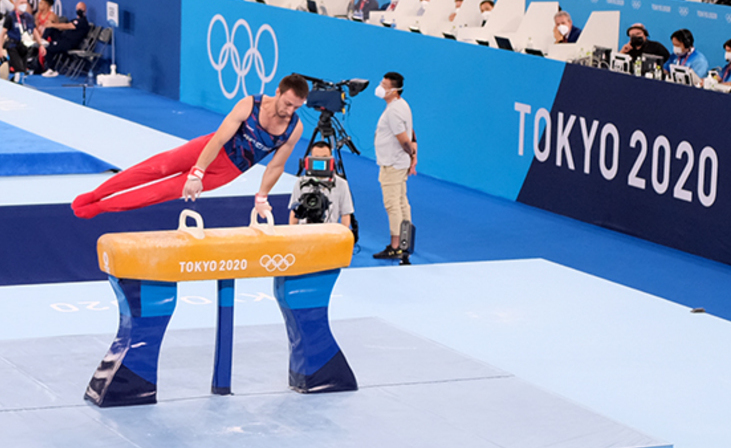
Artur Davtyan at the 2020 Olympics

Armenian male artistic gymnasts started competing at the Olympic Games in 1996. Prior to this they competed as part of the Soviet Union. Norayr Sargsyan was the first Armenian to represent an independent Armenia in artistic gymnastics at the Olympic Games. At the 2020 Olympic Games, Artur Davtyan won Armenia its first medal in artistic gymnastics, a bronze on vault.

== Gymnasts ==
Gymnast	Years
Artur Davtyan	2012, 2016, 2020, 2024
Vahagn Davtyan	2024
Harutyun Merdinyan	2016
Norayr Sargsyan	1996

== Medalists ==
Medal	Name	Year	Event
Bronze	Artur Davtyan	(Japan) 2020 Tokyo	Men's vault
Silver	Artur Davtyan	(France) 2024 Paris	Men's vault

== See also ==
- Armenia men's national artistic gymnastics team
