= Armenia at the 2023 World Aquatics Championships =

- Flag of Armenia
- FINA code: ARM
- National federation: Water Kind Sports Association & Swimming Federation of Armenia

in Fukuoka, Japan
- Competitors: 6 in 2 sports
- Medals: Gold 0 Silver 0 Bronze 0 Total 0

World Aquatics Championships appearances
- 1994; 1998; 2001; 2003; 2005; 2007; 2009; 2011; 2013; 2015; 2017; 2019; 2022; 2023; 2024

Other related appearances
- Soviet Union (1973–1991)

Armenia is set to compete at the 2023 World Aquatics Championships in Fukuoka, Japan from 14 to 30 July.

== Diving ==
Armenia entered 2 divers.

Men

Athlete	Event	Preliminaries		Semifinal		Final	
Athlete	Event	Points	Rank	Points	Rank	Points	Rank
Marat Grigoryan	10 m platform	208.00	40	Did not advance			

Women

Athlete	Event	Preliminaries		Semifinal		Final	
Athlete	Event	Points	Rank	Points	Rank	Points	Rank
Alisa Zakaryan	10 m platform	145.95	36	Did not advance			

== Swimming ==
Armenia entered 4 swimmers.

Men

Athlete	Event	Heat		Semifinal		Final	
Athlete	Event	Time	Rank	Time	Rank	Time	Rank
Artur Barseghyan	100 metre freestyle	51.36	63	Did not advance			
Artur Barseghyan	200 metre freestyle	1:55.69	54	Did not advance			
Ashot Chakhoyan	50 metre breaststroke	29.46	46	Did not advance			
Ashot Chakhoyan	100 metre breaststroke	1:04.47	54	Did not advance			

Women

Athlete	Event	Heat		Semifinal		Final	
Athlete	Event	Time	Rank	Time	Rank	Time	Rank
Varsenik Manucharyan	50 metre freestyle	27.26	58	Did not advance			
Varsenik Manucharyan	100 metre butterfly	1:02.41 NR	37	Did not advance			
Ani Poghosyan	100 metre freestyle	58.80	37	Did not advance			
Ani Poghosyan	200 metre freestyle	2:08.65	49	Did not advance			

Mixed

Athlete	Event	Heat		Final	
Athlete	Event	Time	Rank	Time	Rank
Artur Barseghyan; Ashot Chakhoyan; Ani Poghosyan; Varsenik Manucharyan	4 × 100 m freestyle relay	3:44.95	28	Did not advance	
Artur Barseghyan; Ashot Chakhoyan; Varsenik Manucharyan; Ani Poghosyan	4 × 100 m medley relay	4:09.83	28	Did not advance	
