= List of Armenian records in swimming =

Armenian swimming records

The Armenian records in swimming are the fastest ever performances of swimmers from Armenia, which are recognised and ratified by the Water Kind Sports Association & Swimming Federation of Armenia.

All records were set in finals unless noted otherwise.

== Long Course (50 m) ==
=== Men ===
Event	Time		Name	Club	Date	Meet	Location	Ref
50 m freestyle	22.69	sf	Artur Barseghyan	Armenia	9 October 2018	Youth Olympic Games	Buenos Aires, Argentina	
100 m freestyle	49.78	h	Artur Barseghyan	Armenia	27 July 2021	Olympic Games	Tokyo, Japan	
200 m freestyle	1:52.52		Artur Barseghyan	CN Antibes	30 March 2024	Southern Region Championships	Saint-Raphael, France	
400 m freestyle	4:07.88		Aleksandr Novikov	Armenian SSR	11 July 1978	USSR National Championships	Moscow, Soviet Union	
800 m freestyle	8:50.00		Aleksandr Novikov	Armenian SSR	9 July 1977	USSR National Championships	Leningrad, Soviet Union	
1500 m freestyle	16:40.37		Aleksandr Novikov	Armenian SSR	8 July 1977	USSR National Championships	Leningrad, Soviet Union	
50 m backstroke	27.61	h	Aram Kostanyan	Armenia	3 August 2015	Pan Armenian Games	Yerevan, Armenia	
100 m backstroke	59.79	h	Khachik Plavchyan	Armenia	29 July 2013	World Championships	Barcelona, Spain	
200 m backstroke	2:11.76		Khachik Plavchyan	Armenia	9 July 2010	CA Los Angeles Grand Prix	Los Angeles, United States	
50 m breaststroke	28.41	h	Ashot Chakhoyan	Armenia	14 August 2026	European Championships	Paris, France	
100 m breaststroke	1:04.11	h	Ashot Chakhoyan	Armenia	10 August 2026	European Championships	Paris, France	
200 m breaststroke	2:24.84		Armen Kobilin	Armenian SSR	13 November 1985	USSR National Championships	Volgograd, Soviet Union	
50 m butterfly	24.42	h	Artur Barseghyan	Armenia	10 October 2018	Youth Olympic Games	Buenos Aires, Argentina	
100 m butterfly	54.22	h	Artur Barseghyan	Armenia	16 February 2024	World Championships	Doha, Qatar	
200 m butterfly	2:10.36		Armen Muradyan	Armenian SSR	10 November 1982	USSR National Championships	Kiev, Soviet Union	
200m individual medley	2:14.12		Hakob Panyan	Armenian SSR	5 November 1979	USSR National Championships	Moscow, Soviet Union	
400m individual medley	4:53.27		Hakob Panyan	Armenian SSR	7 November 1979	USSR National Championships	Moscow, Soviet Union	
4×100m freestyle relay	3:38.16		Vladimir Mamikonyan; Micah Brown; Artur Barseghyan; Vahan Mkhitaryan	-	29 April 2017	Armenian Championships	Yerevan, Armenia	
4×200m freestyle relay	8:13.07		Igor Ivanov; Hakob Vardanyan; Samvel Parsamyan; Vagharshak Artenyan	Armenian SSR	1 November 1982	USSR National Championships	Kiev, Soviet Union	
4×100m medley relay	4:04.89		Mikayel Koloyan; Harutyun Harutyunyan; Andranik Harutyunyan; Khachik Plavchyan	Armenia	2 August 2009	World Championships	Rome, Italy	

Legend: # – Record awaiting ratification by Armenian Swimming Federation; WR – World record; ER – European record;
Records not set in finals: h – heat; sf – semifinal; r – relay 1st leg; rh – relay heat 1st leg; b – B final; † – en route to final mark; so – swim-off; tt – time trial

=== Women ===
Event	Time		Name	Club	Date	Meet	Location	Ref
50 m freestyle	26.63	h	Varsenik Manucharyan	Armenia	14 August 2026	European Championships	Paris, France	
100 m freestyle	58.48	h	Ani Poghosyan	Armenia	17 June 2024	European Championships	Belgrade, Serbia	
200 m freestyle	2:08.22	h	Ani Poghosyan	Armenia	13 August 2022	European Championships	Rome, Italy	
400 m freestyle	4:39.09		Ani Poghosyan	-	13 August 2022	Armenian Championships	Yerevan, Armenia	
800 m freestyle	10:24.65		Mari Georgiu	-	29 April 2019	Armenian Championships	Yerevan, Armenia	
1500 m freestyle								
50 m backstroke	32.11		Nina Kirakosyan	-	29 April 2019	Armenian Championships	Yerevan, Armenia	
100 m backstroke	1:10.82	h	Ani Poghosyan	Armenia	3 August 2015	World Championships	Kazan, Russia	
200 m backstroke	2:26.63		Nina Kirakosyan	-	29 April 2019	Armenian Championships	Yerevan, Armenia	
50 m breaststroke	34.23		Varsenik Manucharyan	Armenia	14 August 2022	European Championships	Rome, Italy	
100 m breaststroke	1:21.84	h	Elen Yesayan	Armenia	24 July 2017	World Championships	Budapest, Hungary	
200 m breaststroke	2:47.78		Varsenik Manucharyan	-	29 April 2019	Armenian Championships	Yerevan, Armenia	
50 m butterfly	27.40	h	Varsenik Manucharyan	Armenia	11 August 2026	European Championships	Paris, France	
100 m butterfly	1:00.09	h	Varsenik Manucharyan	Armenia	13 August 2026	European Championships	Paris, France	
200 m butterfly								
200m individual medley	2:24.48	h	Varsenik Manucharyan	Armenia	21 June 2024	European Championships	Belgrade, Serbia	
400m individual medley								
4×100m freestyle relay								
4×200m freestyle relay	8:53.63		Ani Poghosyan (2:09.25); Diana Musayelyan (2:09.85); Varsenik Manucharyan (2:14.34); Yeva Karapetyan (2:20.19)	Armenia	17 June 2024	European Championships	Belgrade, Serbia	
4×100m medley relay								

Legend: # – Record awaiting ratification by Armenian Swimming Federation; WR – World record; ER – European record;
Records not set in finals: h – heat; sf – semifinal; r – relay 1st leg; rh – relay heat 1st leg; b – B final; † – en route to final mark; so – swim-off; tt – time trial

=== Mixed relay ===
Event	Time		Name	Club	Date	Meet	Location	Ref
4×100 m freestyle relay	3:44.07	h	Artur Barseghyan (51.32); Vahan Mkhitaryan (52.66); Ani Poghosyan (59.04); Varsenik Manucharyan (1:01.05)	Armenia	27 July 2019	World Championships	Gwangju, South Korea	
4×200 m freestyle relay	8:35.69	h	Gevorg Tonoyan (2:05.15); Ashot Chakhoyan (2:01.92); Varsenik Manucharyan (2:13.10); Milania Gunko (2:15.52)	Armenia	15 August 2026	European Championships	Paris, France	
4×100 m medley relay	4:04.80	h	Gevorg Tonoyan (1:00.04); Ashot Chakhoyan (1:03.71); Varsenik Manucharyan (1:00.78); Milania Gunko (1:00.27)	Armenia	11 August 2026	European Championships	Paris, France	

Legend: # – Record awaiting ratification by Armenian Swimming Federation; WR – World record; ER – European record;
Records not set in finals: h – heat; so – swim-off

== Short Course (25 m) ==
=== Men ===
Event	Time		Name	Club	Date	Meet	Location	Ref
50 m freestyle	22.16	h	Artur Barseghyan	Armenia	22 November 2022	Solidarity Games	Kazan, Russia	
100 m freestyle	48.09	h	Artur Barseghyan	Armenia	6 November 2021	European Championships	Kazan, Russia	
200 m freestyle	1:50.43	h	Armenia	9 April 2008	World Championships	Manchester, Great Britain		
400 m freestyle								
800 m freestyle								
1500 m freestyle								
50 m backstroke	25.48	rh	Artur Barseghyan	Armenia	3 November 2021	European Championships	Kazan, Russia	
100 m backstroke	58.30	h	Gevorg Tonoyan	Armenia	22 November 2025	Strongest Athletes Cup	Minsk, Belarus	
200 m backstroke	2:07.41	h	Gevorg Tonoyan	Armenia	20 November 2025	Strongest Athletes Cup	Minsk, Belarus	
50 m breaststroke	28.29	h	Ashot Chakhoyan	Armenia	19 December 2025	Vladimir Salnikov Cup	Saint Petersburg, Russia	
100 m breaststroke	1:02.13	h	Ashot Chakhoyan	Armenia	6 December 2023	European Championships	Otopeni, Romania	
200 m breaststroke	2:21.65	h	Ashot Chakhoyan	Armenia	23 November 2025	Strongest Athletes Cup	Minsk, Belarus	
50 m butterfly	23.50	h	Artur Barseghyan	Armenia	5 November 2021	European Championships	Kazan, Russia	
100 m butterfly	53.52	h	Artur Barseghyan	Armenia	21 November 2022	Solidarity Games	Kazan, Russia	
200 m butterfly								
100 m individual medley	59.42	h	Artur Barseghyan	CN Antibes	26 November 2023	Lyon Metropolis Meeting	Lyon, France	
200 m individual medley								
400 m individual medley								
4×50 m freestyle relay	1:35.09	h	Artur Barseghyan (22.53); Levon Kocharyan (23.98); Mushegh Kaganyan (24.07); Eduard Tshagharyan (24.51)	Armenia	23 November 2022	Solidarity Games	Kazan, Russia	
4×100 m freestyle relay	3:28.84	h	Artur Barseghyan (49.35); Levon Kocharyan (52.77); Taron Schisas (53.77); Eduard Tshagharyan (52.95)	Armenia	20 November 2022	Solidarity Games	Kazan, Russia	
4×200 m freestyle relay	7:45.97	h	Artur Barseghyan (1:51.32); Levon Kocharyan (1:58.08); Taron Schisas (1:57.68); Eduard Tshagharyan (1:58.89)	Armenia	23 November 2022	Solidarity Games	Kazan, Russia	
4×50 m medley relay	1:43.73		Gevorg Tonoyan (26.58); Ashot Chakhoyan (28.23); Gor Grigoryan (21.03); Petros Stepanyan (27.89)	Armenia	22 November 2025	Strongest Athletes Cup	Minsk, Belarus	
4×100 m medley relay	3:46.80		Gevorg Tonoyan (58.47); Ashot Chakhoyan (1:00.38); Gor Grigoryan (58.20); Levon Kocharyan (49.75)	Armenia	23 November 2025	Strongest Athletes Cup	Minsk, Belarus	

Legend: # – Record awaiting ratification by Armenian Swimming Federation; WR – World record; ER – European record;
Records not set in finals: h – heat; sf – semifinal; r – relay 1st leg; rh – relay heat 1st leg; b – B final; † – en route to final mark; so – swim-off; tt – time trial

=== Women ===
Event	Time		Name	Club	Date	Meet	Location	Ref
50 m freestyle	26.26	h	Varsenik Manucharyan	Armenia	14 December 2024	World Championships	Budapest, Hungary	
100 m freestyle	57.49	h	Ani Poghosyan	Armenia	21 November 2022	Russian Championships	Kazan, Russia	
200 m freestyle	2:04.30	h	Ani Poghosyan	Armenia	18 December 2022	World Championships	Melbourne, Australia	
400 m freestyle	4:33.05	h	Ani Poghosyan	-	27 April 2022	Armenian Nationals	Yerevan, Armenia	
800 m freestyle	9:50.34	h	Ani Poghosyan	-	30 April 2022	Armenian Nationals	Yerevan, Armenia	
1500 m freestyle								
50 m backstroke	30.93	h	Anahit Barseghyan	Armenia	15 December 2012	World Championships	Istanbul, Turkey	
100 m backstroke	1:05.71	h	Anahit Barseghyan	Armenia	12 December 2012	World Championships	Istanbul, Turkey	
200 m backstroke								
50 m breaststroke								
100 m breaststroke								
200 m breaststroke								
50 m butterfly	27.63		Varsenik Manucharyan	Armenia	21 November 2025	Strongest Athletes Cup	Minsk, Belarus	
100 m butterfly	1:00.52	h	Varsenik Manucharyan	Armenia	13 December 2024	World Championships	Budapest, Hungary	
200 m butterfly								
100 m individual medley								
200 m individual medley								
400 m individual medley								
4×50 m freestyle relay	1:48.84		Varsenik Manucharyan (26.81); Milania Gunko (26.89); Yeva Karapetyan; Ani Poghosyan	Armenia	21 November 2025	Strongest Athletes Cup	Minsk, Belarus	
4×100 m freestyle relay	3:58.12		Varsenik Manucharyan (57.96); Milania Gunko (59.40); Yeva Karapetyan (1:01.75); Ani Poghosyan (59.01)	Armenia	20 November 2025	Strongest Athletes Cup	Minsk, Belarus	
4×200 m freestyle relay								
4×50 m medley relay	2:03.01		Milania Gunko (32.89); Varsenik Manucharyan (33.79); Yeva Karapetyan (28.96); Ani Poghosyan (27.37)	Armenia	22 November 2025	Strongest Athletes Cup	Minsk, Belarus	
4×100 m medley relay	4:29.37		Milania Gunko (1:10.66); Varsenik Manucharyan (1:13.21); Yeva Karapetyan (1:03.51); Ani Poghosyan (1:01.99)	Armenia	22 November 2025	Strongest Athletes Cup	Minsk, Belarus	

Legend: # – Record awaiting ratification by Armenian Swimming Federation; WR – World record; ER – European record;
Records not set in finals: h – heat; sf – semifinal; r – relay 1st leg; rh – relay heat 1st leg; b – B final; † – en route to final mark; so – swim-off; tt – time trial

=== Mixed relay ===
Event	Time		Name	Club	Date	Meet	Location	Ref
4×50 m freestyle relay	1:40.73	h	Vladimir Mamikonyan (23.62); Ani Poghosyan (27.56); Artur Barseghyan (22.38); Varsenik Manucharyan (27.17)	Armenia	12 December 2018	World Championships	Hangzhou, China	
4×50 m medley relay	1:48.44		Gevorg Tonoyan (26.57); Ashot Chakhoyan (27.64); Varsenik Manucharyan (27.37); Milania Gunko (26.86)	Armenia	20 November 2025	Strongest Athletes Cup	Minsk, Belarus	

Legend: # – Record awaiting ratification by Armenian Swimming Federation;
Records not set in finals: h – heat; so – swim-off
