= Armenia at the 2022 European Championships =

in (Germany) Munich 11 August 2022 – 22 August 2022
- Competitors: 16 in 5 sports
- Medals Ranked 28th: Gold 1 Silver 1 Bronze 0 Total 2

European Championships appearances
- 2018; 2022

Armenia competed at the 2022 European Championships in Munich from August 11 to August 22, 2022.

== Medallists ==
| Medal | Name | Sport | Event | Date |
|---|---|---|---|---|
| Gold | Harutyun Merdinyan | Artistic gymnastics | Men's pommel horse | 21 August |
| Silver | Artur Davtyan | Artistic gymnastics | Men's vault | 21 August |

== Competitors ==
The following is the list of number of competitors in the Championships:

| Sport | Men | Women | Total |
|---|---|---|---|
| Artistic gymnastics (men and women) | 5 | 0 | 5 |
| Athletics | 2 | 0 | 2 |
| Canoe sprint | 7 | 0 | 0 |
| Cycling road | 1 | 0 | 1 |
| Cycling track | 1 | 0 | 1 |
| Total | 16 | 0 | 16 |

== Athletics ==
Armenia entered the following athletes.

Key

- Q = Qualified for the next round
- q = Qualified for the next round as a fastest loser or, in field events, by position without achieving the qualifying target
- NR = National record
- PB = Personal best
- SB = Season best
- N/A = Round not applicable for the event

Men
Track and road

| Athlete | Event | Heats | | Semifinal | | Final | |
| Athlete | Event | Result | Rank | Result | Rank | Result | Rank |
|---|---|---|---|---|---|---|---|
| Yervand Mkrtchyan | 1500 metres | 3:43.42 | 11 | — | | Did not advance | |

Field events

| Athletes | Event | Qualification | | Final | |
| Athletes | Event | Distance | Position | Distance | Position |
|---|---|---|---|---|---|
| Levon Aghasyan | Triple jump | 16.03 | 7 | Did not advance | |

== Canoeing ==
Men

| Athlete | Event | Heats | | Semifinals | | Final | |
| Athlete | Event | Time | Rank | Time | Rank | Time | Rank |
|---|---|---|---|---|---|---|---|
| Artur Petrosyan | VL3 200 m | 1:04.119 | 6 SF | 1:02.577 | 6 | did not advance | |

== Cycling ==
=== Road ===
Men

| Athlete | Event | Time | Rank |
|---|---|---|---|
| Stepan Grigoryan | Road race | DNF | |
| Stepan Grigoryan | Time trial | 31:12.51 | 31 |

=== Track ===
Omnium

| Athlete | Event | Qualification | | Scratch Race | | Tempo Race | | Elimination Race | | Points Race | | Total points | Rank |
| Athlete | Event | Rank | Points | Rank | Points | Rank | Points | Rank | Points | Rank | Points | Total points | Rank |
|---|---|---|---|---|---|---|---|---|---|---|---|---|---|
| Stepan Grigoryan | Men's omnium | 8 Q | −4 | 16 | 10 | 16 | 10 | 15 | 12 | 16 | –60 | –28 | 16 |

Points race

| Athlete | Event | Final | |
| Athlete | Event | Points | Rank |
|---|---|---|---|
| Stepan Grigoryan | Men's points race | −19 | 16 |

== Gymnastics ==
=== Men ===
Armenia has entered five male athletes.

Qualification

| Athlete | Qualification | | | | | | | |
| Athlete | Apparatus | | | | | | Total | Rank |
| Athlete | F | PH | R | V | PB | HB | Total | Rank |
|---|---|---|---|---|---|---|---|---|
| Artur Avetisyan | — | | 14.633 Q | — | | | | |
| Artur Davtyan | — | 14.200 Q | — | 15.149 Q | — | | | |
| Vahagn Davtyan | — | | 14.666 Q | — | | | | |
| Gagik Khachikyan | 13.433 | 13.600 | 12.866 | 14.000 | 12.900 | 12.133 | 78.932 | 31 |
| Harutyun Merdinyan | — | 14.500 Q | — | | | | | |

Individual finals

| Athlete | Event | Apparatus | | | | | | Total | Rank |
| Athlete | Event | F | PH | R | V | PB | HB | Total | Rank |
|---|---|---|---|---|---|---|---|---|---|
| Artur Avetisyan | Rings | — | | 13.733 | — | | | 13.733 | 8 |
| Artur Davtyan | Pommel horse | — | 14.033 | — | | | | 14.033 | 6 |
| Artur Davtyan | Vault | — | | | 14.983 | — | | 14.983 | 2nd place, silver medalist(s) |
| Vahagn Davtyan | Rings | — | | 14.766 | — | | | 14.766 | 4 |
| Harutyun Merdinyan | Pommel horse | — | 14.733 | — | | | | 14.733 | 1st place, gold medalist(s) |
