= Armenian Synchronized Swimming Federation =

Sporting Organization

The Armenian Synchronized Swimming Federation (Armenian: Հայաստանի սինխրոն լողի ֆեդերացիա), also known as the Artistic Swimming Federation of Armenia, is the regulating body of synchronized swimming in Armenia, governed by the Armenian Olympic Committee. The headquarters of the federation are located in Yerevan.

== History ==
The Armenian Synchronized Swimming Federation was established in 1996 and the current president is Anahit Tavrizyan. The Federation oversees the training of synchronized swimmers. Armenian synchronized swimmers participate in various European and international level synchronized swimming competitions. The Federation also organizes the "Republican Synchronized Swimming Championships", held in the Aqualand sports and health complex in Yerevan. The Federation cooperates with the Armenian Swimming Federation.

== See also ==
- Armenian Diving Federation
- Sport in Armenia
- Water Polo Federation of Armenia
