= Armenia at the 2013 World Aquatics Championships =

- Flag of Armenia
- FINA code: ARM
- National federation: Armenian Swimming Federation

in Barcelona, Spain
- Competitors: 4 in 2 sports
- Medals: Gold 0 Silver 0 Bronze 0 Total 0

World Aquatics Championships appearances
- 1994; 1998; 2001; 2003; 2005; 2007; 2009; 2011; 2013; 2015; 2017; 2019; 2022; 2023; 2024

Other related appearances
- Soviet Union (1973–1991)

Armenia is competing at the 2013 World Aquatics Championships in Barcelona, Spain between 19 July and 4 August 2013.

== Diving ==
Armenia qualified a single quota for the following diving events.

Men

Athlete	Event	Preliminaries		Semifinals		Final	
Athlete	Event	Points	Rank	Points	Rank	Points	Rank
Lev Sargsyan	10 m platform	333.40	24	did not advance			

== Swimming ==
Armenian swimmers achieved qualifying standards in the following events (up to a maximum of 2 swimmers in each event at the A-standard entry time, and 1 at the B-standard):

Men

Athlete	Event	Heat		Semifinal		Final	
Athlete	Event	Time	Rank	Time	Rank	Time	Rank
Vahan Mkhitaryan	50 m freestyle	23.58	50	did not advance			
Khachik Plavchyan	50 m backstroke	27.97	36	did not advance			
Khachik Plavchyan	100 m backstroke	59.79	42	did not advance			

Women

Athlete	Event	Heat		Semifinal		Final	
Athlete	Event	Time	Rank	Time	Rank	Time	Rank
Monika Vasilyan	50 m freestyle	27.50	50	did not advance			
Monika Vasilyan	100 m freestyle	59.08	55	did not advance			
