= Armenia at the 2022 World Aquatics Championships =

- Flag of Armenia
- FINA code: ARM
- National federation: Armenian Swimming Federation

in Budapest, Hungary
- Competitors: 4 in 2 sports
- Medals: Gold 0 Silver 0 Bronze 0 Total 0

World Aquatics Championships appearances
- 1994; 1998; 2001; 2003; 2005; 2007; 2009; 2011; 2013; 2015; 2017; 2019; 2022; 2023; 2024

Other related appearances
- Soviet Union (1973–1991)

Armenia competed at the 2022 World Aquatics Championships in Budapest, Hungary from 17 June to 3 July.

== Diving ==
Armenia entered two divers.

Men

Athlete	Event	Preliminaries		Semifinals		Final	
Athlete	Event	Points	Rank	Points	Rank	Points	Rank
Vladimir Harutyunyan	10 m platform	288.55	33	did not advance			

Women

Athlete	Event	Preliminaries		Semifinals		Final	
Athlete	Event	Points	Rank	Points	Rank	Points	Rank
Alisa Zakaryan	1 m springboard	Withdrawn		did not advance			

== Swimming ==
Armenia entered two swimmers.

Men

Athlete	Event	Heat		Semifinal		Final	
Athlete	Event	Time	Rank	Time	Rank	Time	Rank
Artur Barseghyan	50 m freestyle	23.46	=55	did not advance			
Artur Barseghyan	100 m freestyle	50.43	=50	did not advance			

Women

Athlete	Event	Heat		Semifinal		Final	
Athlete	Event	Time	Rank	Time	Rank	Time	Rank
Varsenik Manucharyan	50 m freestyle	27.08	44	did not advance			
Varsenik Manucharyan	50 m butterfly	28.80	43	did not advance			
