= 2023 European Diving Championships – Men's synchronized 10 metre platform =

Men's synchronized 10 metre platform at the 2023 European Diving Championships
- Venue: Rzeszów Diving Arena
- Date: 25 June
- Competitors: 14 from 7 nations
- Teams: 7
- Winning points: 398.70

Medalists
gold medal	Kirill Boliukh; Oleksiy Sereda	Ukraine
silver medal	Riccardo Giovannini; Eduard Timbretti Gugiu	Italy
bronze medal	Ben Cutmore; Matthew Dixon	Great Britain

The men's synchronized 10 metre platform event at the 2023 European Diving Championships was held on 25 June 2023.

== Results ==
The final was held at 15:00.

Rank	Nation	Divers	D1	D2	D3	D4	D5	D6	Total
1st place, gold medalist(s)	Ukraine	Kirill Boliukh; Oleksiy Sereda	52.80	49.80	83.52	73.92	55.50	83.16	398.70
2nd place, silver medalist(s)	Italy	Riccardo Giovannini; Eduard Timbretti Gugiu	48.00	46.80	61.20	78.72	80.19	73.92	388.83
3rd place, bronze medalist(s)	Great Britain	Ben Cutmore; Matthew Dixon	49.80	48.00	77.76	70.38	72.36	54.39	372.69
4	Germany	Timo Barthel; Jaden Eikermann	50.40	47.40	67.20	65.34	58.14	68.16	356.64
5	Poland	Filip Jachim; Robert Łukaszewicz	49.80	46.80	62.10	64.32	66.33	63.36	352.71
6	France	Gary Hunt; Loïs Szymczak	49.80	48.60	48.60	55.44	67.20	46.20	315.84
7	Armenia	Marat Grigoryan; Vladimir Harutyunyan	34.80	43.80	55.80	53.94	65.28	52.80	306.42
