= Diving at the 2018 European Aquatics Championships – Men's 10 m platform =

Men's 10 m platform at the 2018 European Aquatics Championships
- Venue: Royal Commonwealth Pool
- Dates: 12 August
- Competitors: 16 from 10 nations
- Winning points: 542.05

Medalists
gold medal	Aleksandr Bondar	Russia
silver medal	Nikita Shleikher	Russia
bronze medal	Benjamin Auffret	France

The Men's 10 m platform competition of the 2018 European Aquatics Championships was held on 12 August 2018.

== Results ==
The preliminary round was started at 09:30. The final was held at 14:00.

Green denotes finalists

Rank	Diver	Nationality	Preliminary		Final	
Rank	Diver	Nationality	Points	Rank	Points	Rank
1st place, gold medalist(s)	Aleksandr Bondar	Russia	459.60	1	542.05	1
2nd place, silver medalist(s)	Nikita Shleikher	Russia	431.10	5	481.15	2
3rd place, bronze medalist(s)	Benjamin Auffret	France	439.05	3	480.60	3
4	Maksym Dolhov	Ukraine	402.90	9	464.65	4
5	Matty Lee	Great Britain	458.55	2	452.20	5
6	Matthew Dixon	Great Britain	423.40	7	448.90	6
7	Lev Sargsyan	Armenia	429.90	6	437.30	7
8	Timo Barthel	Germany	431.95	4	408.25	8
9	Vladimir Barbu	Italy	377.80	10	392.50	9
10	Vadim Kaptur	Belarus	415.60	8	375.60	10
11	Florian Fandler	Germany	365.15	12	364.40	11
12	Vinko Paradzik	Sweden	369.80	11	359.55	12
13	Nikolaos Molvalis	Greece	351.70	13	did not advance	
14	Artsiom Barouski	Belarus	336.55	14	did not advance	
15	Oleh Serbin	Ukraine	331.10	15	did not advance	
16	Vartan Bayanduryan	Armenia	248.25	16	did not advance	
