= Norayr Sargsyan =

Armenian gymnast (born 1974)

- Born: September 25, 1974 (age 51) Parakar, Armenian SSR, Soviet Union

Gymnastics career
- Discipline: Men's artistic gymnastics
- Country represented: Armenia
- Club: Club des Etudiants
Medal record
Olympic Games

Norayr Sargsyan (Armenian: Նորայր Սարգսյան, born September 25, 1974, in Parakar, Armenian SSR) is an Armenian retired gymnast. He competed at the 1996 Summer Olympics.
