= Diving at the 2024 European Aquatics Championships – Men's 3 m springboard =

Men's 3 m springboard at the 2024 European Aquatics Championships
- Venue: Serbian Institute for Sports and Sports Medicine
- Dates: 22 June
- Competitors: 25 from 16 nations
- Winning points: 440.75

Medalists
gold medal	Gwendal Bisch	France
silver medal	Matteo Santoro	Italy
bronze medal	Matthew Dixon	Great Britain

The Men's 3 m springboard competition of the 2024 European Aquatics Championships was held on 22 June 2024.

== Results ==
The preliminary round was started at 10:00. The final was held at 16:40.

Green denotes finalists

Rank	Diver	Nationality	Preliminary		Final	
Rank	Diver	Nationality	Points	Rank	Points	Rank
1st place, gold medalist(s)	Gwendal Bisch	France	407.80	1	440.75	1
2nd place, silver medalist(s)	Matteo Santoro	Italy	392.10	3	431.55	2
3rd place, bronze medalist(s)	Matthew Dixon	Great Britain	374.75	5	431.15	3
4	Jules Bouyer	France	393.50	2	425.40	4
5	Leon Baker	Great Britain	360.50	8	406.05	5
6	Nikolaj Schaller	Austria	339.75	12	389.80	6
7	Alexander Lube	Germany	375.90	4	384.15	7
8	Kacper Lesiak	Poland	372.55	6	376.70	8
9	Elias Petersen	Sweden	362.00	7	374.25	9
10	Alexandru Avasiloae	Romania	359.90	9	362.65	10
11	Isak Børslien	Norway	348.85	10	315.50	11
12	Tornike Onikashvili	Georgia	340.40	11	280.50	12
13	Juan Pablo Cortes	Spain	337.25	13	Did not advance	
14	Andrzej Rzeszutek	Poland	335.15	14	Did not advance	
15	Stefano Belotti	Italy	333.95	15	Did not advance	
16	Matej Nevešćanin	Croatia	332.00	16	Did not advance	
17	Danylo Konovalov	Ukraine	327.85	17	Did not advance	
18	Stanislav Oliferchyk	Ukraine	317.65	18	Did not advance	
19	Lou Massenberg	Germany	300.35	19	Did not advance	
20	Sebastian Konecki	Lithuania	296.60	20	Did not advance	
21	Nikola Paraušić	Serbia	274.55	21	Did not advance	
22	Giorgi Tsulukidze	Georgia	261.05	22	Did not advance	
23	Jonas Madsen	Denmark	231.00	23	Did not advance	
24	Bogdan Savić	Serbia	224.95	24	Did not advance	
25	Theofilos Afthinos	Georgia	218.45	25	Did not advance	
