= Diving at the 2018 European Aquatics Championships – Men's 10 m synchro platform =

Men's 10 m synchro platform at the 2018 European Aquatics Championships
- Venue: Royal Commonwealth Pool
- Dates: 9 August
- Competitors: 10 from 5 nations
- Teams: 5
- Winning points: 423.12

Medalists
gold medal	Aleksandr Bondar; Viktor Minibaev	Russia
silver medal	Matthew Dixon; Noah Williams	Great Britain
bronze medal	Vladimir Harutyunyan; Lev Sargsyan	Armenia

The Men's 10 m synchro platform competition of the 2018 European Aquatics Championships was held on 9 August 2018.

== Results ==
The final was started at 13:30.

Rank	Nation	Divers	
Rank	Nation	Divers	Points
1st place, gold medalist(s)	Russia	Aleksandr Bondar; Viktor Minibaev	423.12
2nd place, silver medalist(s)	Great Britain	Matthew Dixon; Noah Williams	399.90
3rd place, bronze medalist(s)	Armenia	Vladimir Harutyunyan; Lev Sargsyan	396.84
4	Germany	Timo Barthel; Florian Fandler	360.66
5	Belarus	Artsiom Barouski; Vadim Kaptur	354.15
