= Armenian Diving Federation =

Sporting Organization

The Armenian Diving Federation (Armenian: Հայաստանի ջրացատկի ֆեդերացիա), is the regulating body of diving in Armenia, governed by the Armenian Olympic Committee. The headquarters of the federation is located in Yerevan.

== History ==
The Federation is currently led by president Gabriel Ghazaryan. The Federation oversees the training of diving specialists. Armenian diving athletes participate in various European and international level diving competitions, including diving at the Summer Olympics. The Armenian Diving Championships are organized by the Federation.

== See also ==
- Armenian Swimming Federation
- Sport in Armenia
- Water Polo Federation of Armenia
