= Armenian Gymnastics Federation =

Sporting Organization

Armenian Gymnastics Federation logo

The Armenian Gymnastics Federation (Armenian: Հայաստանի մարմնամարզության ֆեդերացիա), also known as the Gymnastics Federation of Armenia, is the regulating body of gymnastics and artistic gymnastics in Armenia, governed by the Armenian Olympic Committee. The headquarters of the federation is located in Yerevan.

== History ==
The Federation was established in 1993, and the current president is Gagik Vanoyan. Early in its history, the Federation struggled economically in the wake of the collapse of the Soviet Union as well as the 1988 Armenian earthquake. In 1998, it was reported that the gymnasts had one gym in which to train with equipment in poor shape. Many coaches left for other countries, as pay was so low in Armenia that they needed to have second jobs to support themselves.

The Federation is a full member of the International Gymnastics Federation and European Gymnastics. Armenian gymnasts participate in various European, international and Olympic level competitions, including the Gymnastics World Championships.

In June 2016, members of the Federation met with representatives of the National Olympic Committee of Armenia who congratulated the Armenian athletes for registering excellent results in the European Championships.

In August 2021, former mayor of Yerevan Hayk Marutyan hosted representatives of the Armenian gymnastics team, and awarded them with honors following the team's success at the 2020 Olympic Games.

In December 2021, the Federation hosted an event at the Karen Demirchyan Complex honoring gymnasts following the European Gymnastics Championships.

== See also ==
- Albert Azaryan (former President of the Armenian Gymnastics Federation)
- Armenia men's national artistic gymnastics team
- Sport in Armenia
