= Armenia at the 2011 World Aquatics Championships =

Sporting event delegation

- Flag of Armenia
- World Aquatics code: ARM
- National federation: Armenian Swimming Federation

in Shanghai, China
- Competitors: 4 in 2 sports
- Medals: Gold 0 Silver 0 Bronze 0 Total 0

World Aquatics Championships appearances
- 1994; 1998; 2001; 2003; 2005; 2007; 2009; 2011; 2013; 2015; 2017; 2019; 2022; 2023; 2024; 2025

Other related appearances
- Soviet Union (1973–1991)

Armenia competed at the 2011 World Aquatics Championships in Shanghai, China between July 16 and 31, 2011.

== Swimming ==
Armenia qualified 3 swimmers.

Men

Athlete	Event	Heats		Semifinals		Final	
Athlete	Event	Time	Rank	Time	Rank	Time	Rank
Mikael Koloyan	Men's 50m Freestyle	24.45	55	did not advance			
Mikael Koloyan	Men's 100m Freestyle	53.12	64	did not advance			

Women

Athlete	Event	Heats		Semifinals		Final	
Athlete	Event	Time	Rank	Time	Rank	Time	Rank
Monica Vasilyan	Women's 50m Freestyle	28.51	54	did not advance			
Monica Vasilyan	Women's 100m Freestyle	1:01.82	57	did not advance			
Anahit Barseghyan	Women's 50m Backstroke	32.49	48	did not advance			
Anahit Barseghyan	Women's 100m Backstroke	1:08.99	51	did not advance			

== Synchronised Swimming ==
Armenia qualified 1 athlete in Synchronised Swimming.

Women

Athlete	Event	Preliminary		Final	
Athlete	Event	Points	Rank	Points	Rank
Seda Khachatrayan	Solo Free Routine	56.720	32	did not advance	
