= Parakar =

Parakar Փարաքար
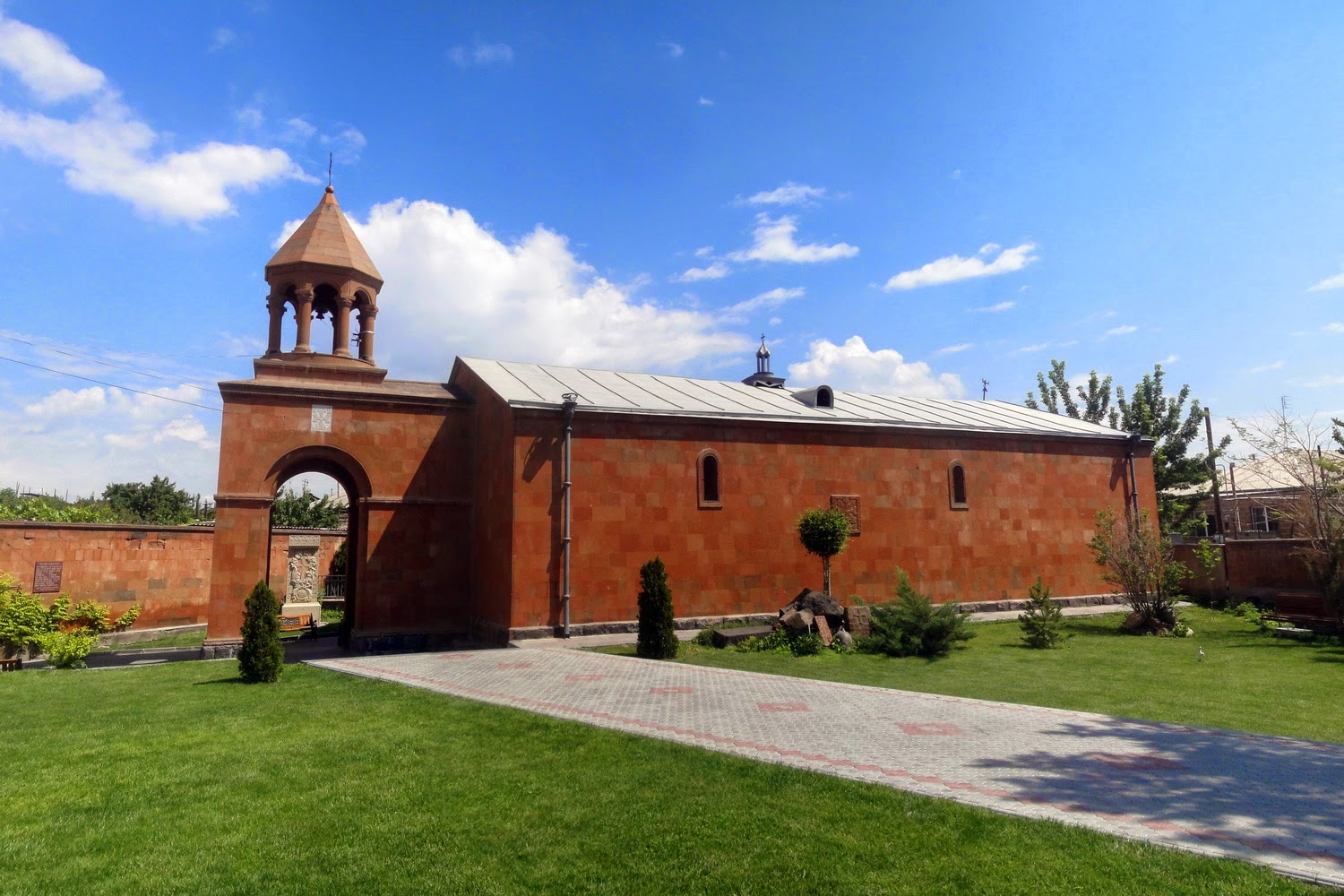
- Surp Harutyun church

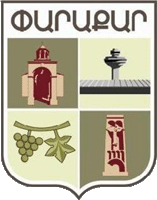
- Coat of arms

- Location within Armenia
- Coordinates: 40°09′50″N 44°24′21″E
- Country: Armenia
- Province: Armavir
- Municipality: Parakar

Population (2011)
  - Total: 5,584
- Time zone: UTC+4 ( )
  - Summer (DST): UTC+5 ( )

Parakar (Armenian: Փարաքար) is a village in the Parakar Municipality of the Armavir Province of Armenia. According to the 2010 official estimate, the population of Parakar is 9,297 (including Tairov). The village is notable for its gypsum mine. The Zvartnots International Airport is located just to the south of the village.

== Churches in Parakar ==
- Church of the Holy Mother of God: built by the order of Catholicos Nerses V in 1855. It was renovated and reopened in 1992.
- Surp Harutyun Church: originally built during the 9th century but almost entirely destroyed after the devastating earthquake of 1679. It remained in ruins until mid 19th century when it was rebuilt by the efforts of the villagers of Parakar and opened in 1859. In 1984, the belfry of the church was erected. In 1992, the church was partly renovated. Finally, the church was entirely renovated in 2004 by the efforts of Armenian benefactors from the United States.

== Notable people ==
- Norayr Sargsyan, is an Armenian retired gymnast. He competed at the 1996 Summer Olympics.
