= Matthew Dixon (diver) =

British diver (born 2000)

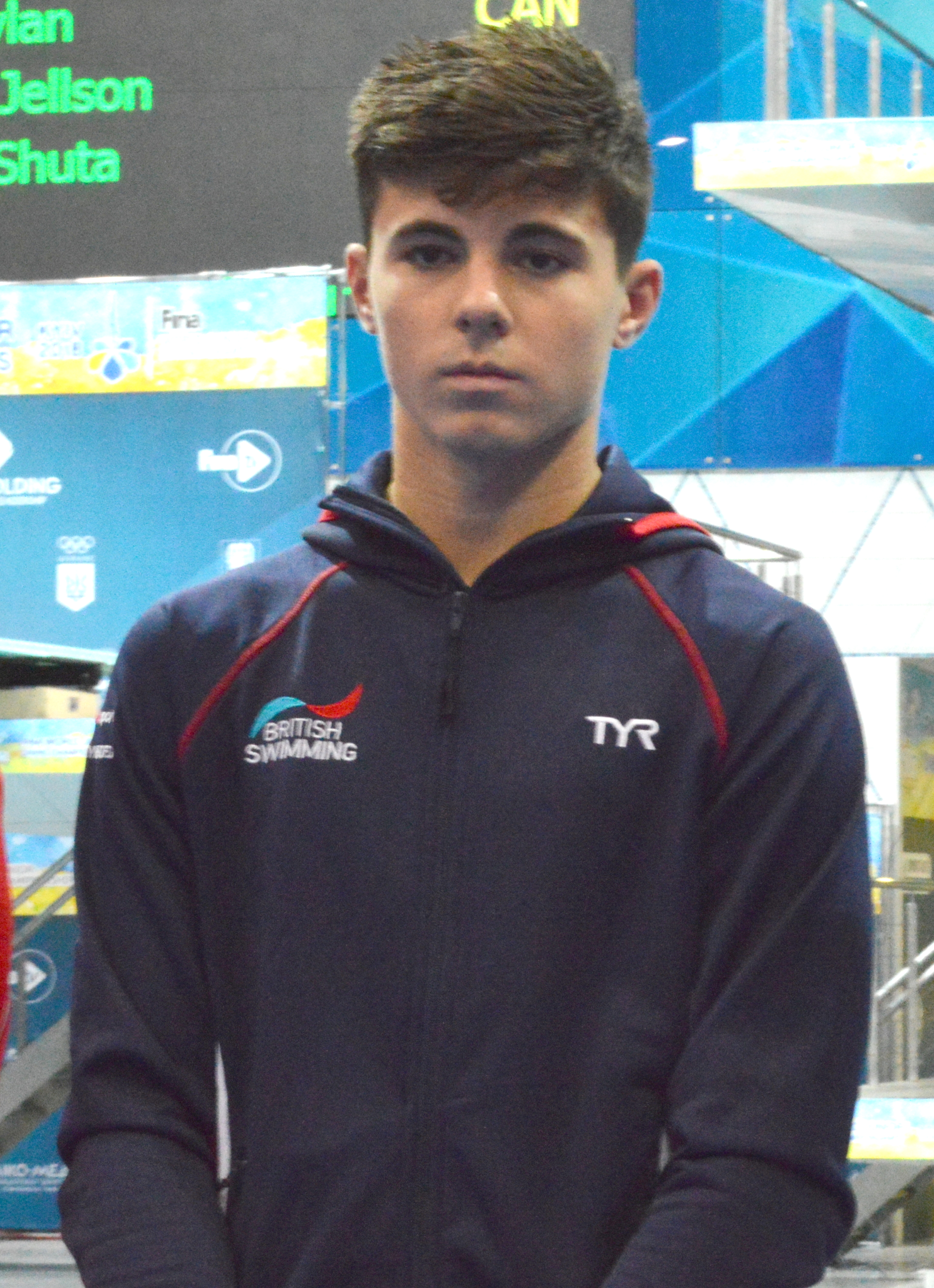
- Dixon at the 22nd FINA World Junior Diving Championships in Kyiv

Personal information
- Full name: Matthew Lewis Dixon
- Born: 19 April 2000 (age 26) Plymouth, United Kingdom
- Height: 1.79 m (5 ft 10 in)
- Weight: 74 kg (163 lb)

Sport
- Country: United Kingdom
- Sport: Diving
- Event: 10 m
- Club: Dive London Aquatics
- Coached by: Alex Rochas
Medal record
Representing Great Britain
European Games
| Bronze medal – third place | 2023 Kraków-Małopolska | 10 m synchro |
European Championships
| Silver medal – second place | 2018 Glasgow | 10 m synchro |
| Bronze medal – third place | 2024 Belgrade | 3 m springboard |
European Diving Championships
| Bronze medal – third place | 2017 Kyiv | 10 m synchro |
| Bronze medal – third place | 2019 Kyiv | 10 m synchro |
| Bronze medal – third place | 2023 Rzeszów | 10 m synchro |
World Junior Championships
| Bronze medal – third place | 2016 Kazan | 10 m platform |
| Silver medal – second place | 2018 Kyiv | 10 m synchro |
European Junior Championships
| Bronze medal – third place | 2014 Bergamo | 10 m platform |
| Gold medal – first place | 2016 Rijeka | 10 m platform |
| Gold medal – first place | 2017 Bergen | 10 m platform |
| Silver medal – second place | 2017 Bergen | 10 m synchro |
Representing England
Commonwealth Games
| Silver medal – second place | 2018 Gold Coast | 10 m platform |
| Silver medal – second place | 2018 Gold Coast | 10 m synchro |

Matthew Lewis Dixon (born 19 April 2000) is an English diver who represents Great Britain and specialises in the 10 metre platform event. He won a silver medal at the European Championships in the 10 m synchro platform with Noah Williams as well as two silvers at the Commonwealth Games.

== Career ==
=== 2012–13 ===
At the 2012 British National Cup Matthew finished 12th in the 10 m platform. At the 2013 British Diving Championship he finished 10th in the 3 m springboard and 5th in the 10 m Platform preliminaries.

=== 2014: Commonwealth Games ===
At the 2014 European Junior Championships he finished 15th in the 1 m Springboard, 8th in the 3 m Springboard and won Bronze on the platform. At the 2014 British National Cup he finished 8th in the 3 m springboard and 5th in the 10 m platform. At the 2014 British Diving Championship he won Gold in the 10 m platform. At the 2014 Commonwealth Games Matthew finished 9th in the 10 m platform.

=== 2017 ===
In 2017, Dixon partnered with Noah Williams in the men's synchronized 10 metre platform in the FINA Grand Prix event held in Gatineau, Canada, and won a gold medal. At the European Juniors in Bergen, Norway, the duo also won a silver in the 10 metre platform synchro. Dixon also won a gold in the group A platform, beating his diving partner Williams.

At the 2017 European Diving Championships, Williams and Dixon won their first senior international title, gaining a bronze in the 10 metre platform synchro.

=== 2018–2019 ===
At the 2018 British Diving Championships, Dixon reclaimed his 10m platform title, scoring 437.10 in the prelims and a new personal best of 494.30 in the final, beating Leeds' Matty Lee and London's Noah Williams. Dixon and Williams came 2nd in the 10m synchro.

At the 2018 Commonwealth Games in Australia, Dixon and Williams scored 399.99 points, winning the silver medal behind fellow GB divers Tom Daley and Daniel Goodfellow. He also won a silver medal in the 10m individual event with a final score of 449.55, losing out to Australian diver Domonic Bedggood, who came first with a score of 451.15.

At the World Junior Diving Championships in Kyiv, Dixon and Williams won the silver medal in the 10 metre platform synchro.

At the 2018 European Championships in Glasgow/Edinburgh, Dixon won a silver with Noah Williams in the Men's 10 m synchro platform.

At the 2019 European Diving Championships held in Kyiv, Dixon won a bronze in Men's 10m synchro with Williams.

== Achievements ==
| Competition | 2012 | 2013 | 2014 | 2015 | 2016 | 2017 | 2018 | 2019 | 2020 | 2021 | 2022 | 2023 | 2024 |
|---|---|---|---|---|---|---|---|---|---|---|---|---|---|
| World Cup, 10m platform | | | | | | | 9th | | | 6th | | | |
| World Cup, 10m synchro | | | | | | | 6th | | | | | | |
| Commonwealth Games, 10m platform | | | 9th | | | | 2nd | | | | 11th^{[A]} | | |
| Commonwealth Games, 10m synchro | | | | | | | 2nd | | | | | | |
| European Aquatics Championships, 10m platform | | | | | | | 6th | | | | | | |
| European Aquatics Championships, 10m synchro | | | | | | | 2nd | | | | | | |
| European Aquatics Championships, 3m springboard | | | | | | | | | | | | | 3rd |
| European Aquatics Championships, 1m springboard | | | | | | | | | | | | | 6th |
| European Diving Championships, 10m platform | | | | 14th^{[A]} | | 6th | | 8th | | | | | |
| European Diving Championships, 10m synchro | | | | | | 3rd | | 3rd | | | | 3rd | |
| European Diving Championships, 3m springboard | | | | | | | | | | | | 6th | |
| European Games, 10m platform | | | | 4th | | | | | | | | | |
| World Junior Championships, 10m platform | | | 8th | | 3rd | | 5th | | | | | | |
| World Junior Championships, 10m synchro | | | | | | | 2nd | | | | | | |
| European Junior Championships, 10m platform | | | 3rd | | 1st | 1st | | | | | | | |
| European Junior Championships, 10m synchro | | | | | | 2nd | | | | | | | |
| European Junior Championships, 3m springboard | | | 8th | | | | | | | | | | |
| European Junior Championships, 1m springboard | | | 15th^{[A]} | | | | | | | | | | |
| British Championships, 10m platform | | 5th^{[A]} | 1st | 2nd | 4th | 2nd | 1st | 3rd | 1st | | 3rd | | |
| British Championships, 10m synchro | | | | | | 2nd | 2nd | 1st | | | 3rd | | |
| British Championships, 3m springboard | | 10th^{[A]} | 9th^{[A]} | | | | | | | | | | |
| British National Cup, 10m platform | 13th^{[A]} | | 5th | | 4th | 3rd | | 2nd | | | | 4th | |
| British National Cup, 10m synchro | | | | | | 1st | | | | | | | |
| British National Cup, 3m springboard | | | 8th | | | | | | | | | | |
| British National Cup, 1m springboard | | | | | | | | | | | 3rd | | |
