= Armenia men's national artistic gymnastics team =

Armenia men's national gymnastics team
- Continental union: European Gymnastics Union
- National federation: Armenian Gymnastics Federation

Olympic Games
- Appearances: 3

World Championships

Junior World Championships

European Championships

The Armenia men's national artistic gymnastics team represents Armenia in FIG international competitions.

== History ==
Albert Azaryan and Hrant Shahinyan were two successful Armenian gymnasts when Armenia was part of the Soviet Union (Armenian SSR); both gymnasts won numerous Olympic and World medals. After the dissolution of the Soviet Union, Armenia began competing as an independent nation at the 1993 World Championships. At the 2015 World Championships, Harutyun Merdinyan won the first World Championships medal for an independent Armenia, a bronze on pommel horse. At the 2020 Olympic Games, Artur Davtyan won the first Olympic medal for Armenia, a bronze on vault.

At the 2026 World Championships, all four Armenian athletes who competed won a medal; Davtyan won gold on vault, Hamlet Manukyan and Mamikon Khachatryan won gold and bronze respectively on pommel horse, and Artur Avetisyan won bronze on rings. This medal haul helped Armenia finish the competition third in the men's medal standings behind powerhouses China and Japan.

== Current roster ==
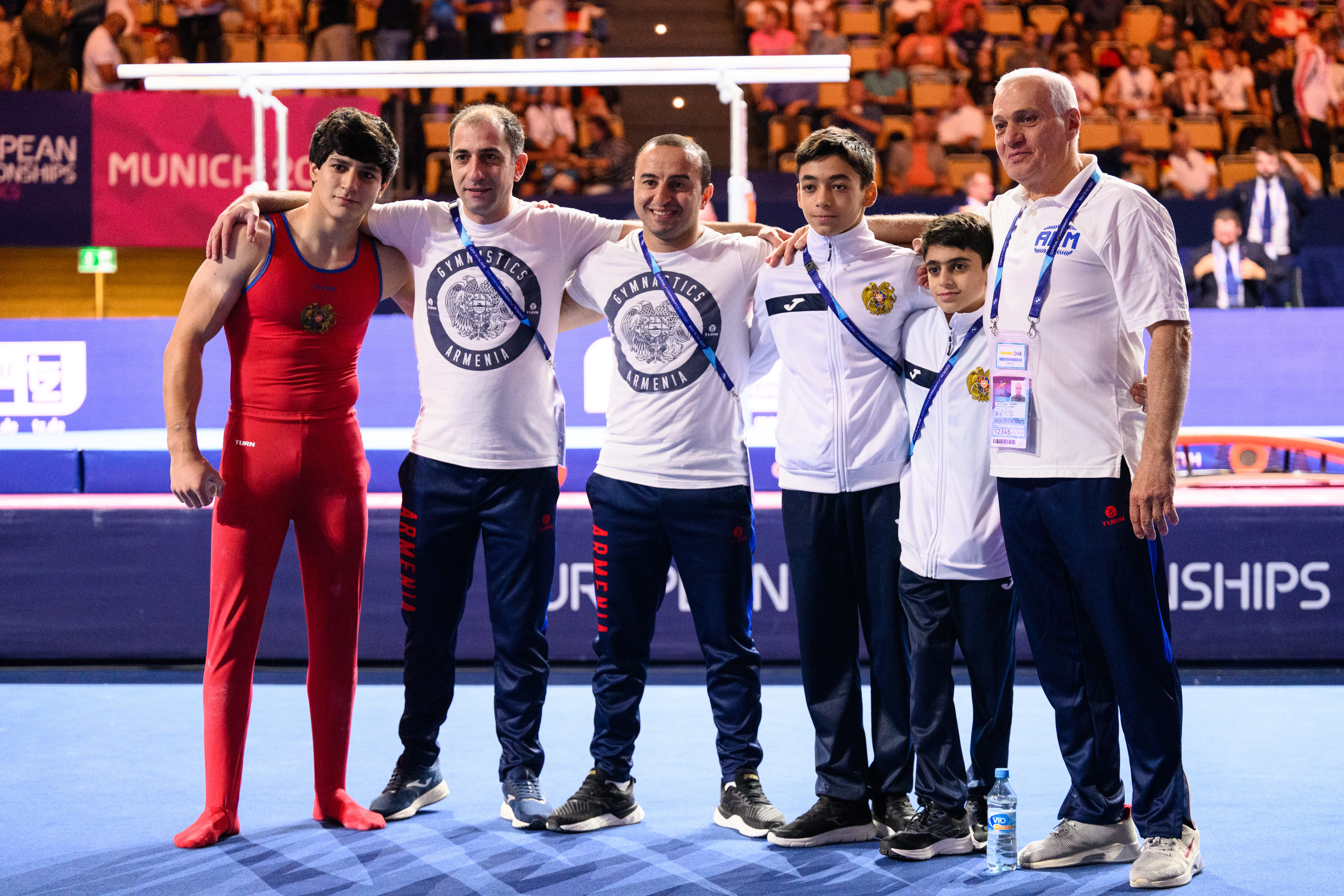
Junior Armenian team at the 2022 European Championships

Name	Birthdate and age	Hometown
Artur Avetisyan	1 January 1998 (age 28)	Yerevan
Erik Baghdasaryan	30 July 2005 (age 21)	Yerevan
Artur Davtyan	9 August 1992 (age 34)	Yerevan
Vahagn Davtyan	18 August 1988 (age 38)	Yerevan
Shekspir Gevorgyan	2008	Yerevan
Robert Gyulumyan	2006	Yerevan
Gagik Khachikyan	16 August 2002 (age 24)	Yerevan
Mamikon Khachatryan	18 February 2007 (age 19)	Yerevan
Hamlet Manukyan	22 August 2007 (age 19)	Vagharshapat
Artur Tovmasyan	1992	Yerevan

== Team competition results ==
=== Junior World Championships ===
- 2023 – 4th place
  Erik Baghdasaryan, Mamikon Khachatryan, Hamlet Manukyan

== Most decorated gymnasts ==
This list includes all Armenian male artistic gymnasts who have won a medal at the Olympic Games or the World Artistic Gymnastics Championships. Not included are medals won as part of the Soviet Union.

Rank	Gymnast	Team	AA	FX	PH	SR	VT	PB	HB	Olympic Total	World Total	Total
1	Artur Davtyan						2024; 2020; 2022; 2026; 2025			2	3	5
2	Mamikon Khachatryan				2025; 2026					0	2	2
3	Harutyun Merdinyan				2015; 2022					0	2	2
4	Hamlet Manukyan				2026					0	1	1
5	Artur Avetisyan					2026				0	1	1

== See also ==
- List of Olympic male artistic gymnasts for Armenia
- Sport in Armenia
