= Armenian Swimming Federation =

Sporting Organization

The Armenian Swimming Federation (Armenian: Հայաստանի լողի ֆեդերացիա, romanized: Hayastani loghi federats’ia), also known as the Water Kind of Sports & Swimming Association of Armenia, is the regulating body of swimming in Armenia, governed by the Armenian Olympic Committee. The headquarters of the federation is located in Yerevan.

== History ==
The Federation was established in 1992 and is currently led by president Hovsep Mesropyan. The Federation is a full member of World Aquatics and European Aquatics. The Federation records and manages the official list of Armenian records in swimming. Armenian swimming athletes have participated in various European, World and Olympic level championship competitions.

The Federation organizes the annual Prime Minister's Cup, a swimming competition held at Lake Sevan. In 2022, over 100 swimmers participated, including citizens from foreign countries.

== See also ==
- Armenian Diving Federation
- Armenian Synchronized Swimming Federation
- List of World Aquatics member federations
- Sport in Armenia
- Water Polo Federation of Armenia
