= Florian Fandler =

German diver

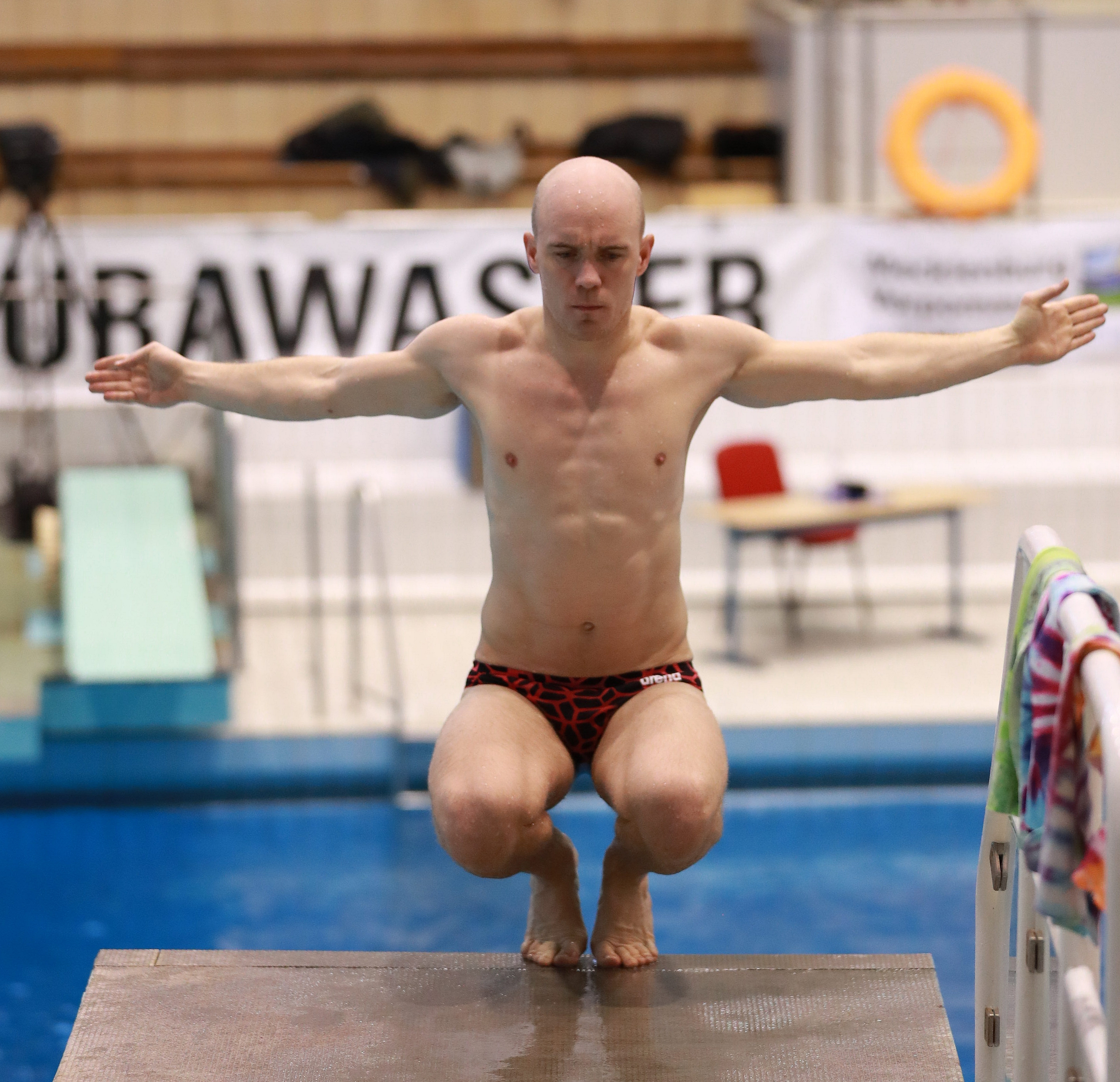

Personal information
- Nationality: German
- Born: 8 October 1987 (age 38) Halle, Germany

Sport
- Country: Germany
- Sport: Diving
- Event: 10 m Synchro
Medal record
European Championships
Bronze medal – third place	2018 Glasgow	10 m mixed synchro

Florian Fandler (born 8 October 1987) is a German diver.

He won a bronze medal in the 10 m mixed synchro platform competition at the 2018 European Aquatics Championships.
