= Water Polo Federation of Armenia =

Sporting Organization

Water Polo Federation of Armenia logo

The Water Polo Federation of Armenia (WPFA) (Armenian: Հայաստանի ջրագնդակի ֆեդերացիա, romanized: Hayastani jragndaki federats’ia), is the regulating body of water polo in Armenia, governed by the Armenian Olympic Committee. The Water Polo Federation of Armenia is a member of the European Swimming League and is affiliated with FINA. The headquarters of the federation is located in Yerevan.

== History ==
The Federation was established in 1995 and the current president is Gagik Hovhannisyan. The Federation oversees the training of water polo specialists. Armenian water polo athletes participate in various European, international and Olympic level water polo competitions. The Federation cooperates with the USA Water Polo Federation, the Russian Water Polo Federation, and the Olympic Water Reserves Club.

== See also ==
- Armenian Swimming Federation
- Sport in Armenia
