= Monika Vasilyan =

Armenian swimmer

Personal information
- Born: 8 October 1995 (age 30)
- Height: 166 cm (5 ft 5 in)
- Weight: 59 kg (130 lb)

Sport
- Sport: Swimming
- Strokes: Freestyle

Monika Vasilyan (born 8 October 1995) is an Armenian swimmer. She has represented her country at European and World Aquatic Championship.

== Career ==
Vasilyan took up swimming when aged 3 years old, she was influenced by her uncle who was a water polo player. She competes mainly in the 50m freestyle and 100m freestyle, she competed in the 2014 European Aquatics Championships and the 2016 European Aquatics Championships and also swam in the 2013 World Aquatics Championships and two years later in the 2015 World Aquatics Championships.

In 2016, she was given an Olympic wildcard to enter the 2016 Summer Olympics in Rio de Janeiro, Brazil, but during training in Rio, she damaged her arm and on doctors advice she didn't compete. She was scheduled to compete in the women's 50 metre freestyle event.

Vasilyan has been National Swimming Champion for seven years, and holds three National records.

She is currently studying at the Armenian State Institute of Physical Culture.
