= Elen Yesayan =

Armenian swimmer

Personal information
- Born: 17 February 2003 (age 23)

Sport
- Sport: Swimming

Elen Yesayan (born 17 February 2003) is an Armenian swimmer. She competed in the women's 100 metre breaststroke event at the 2017 World Aquatics Championships.
