= Vahagn Davtyan (gymnast) =

Armenian artistic gymnast

- Վահագն Դավթյան
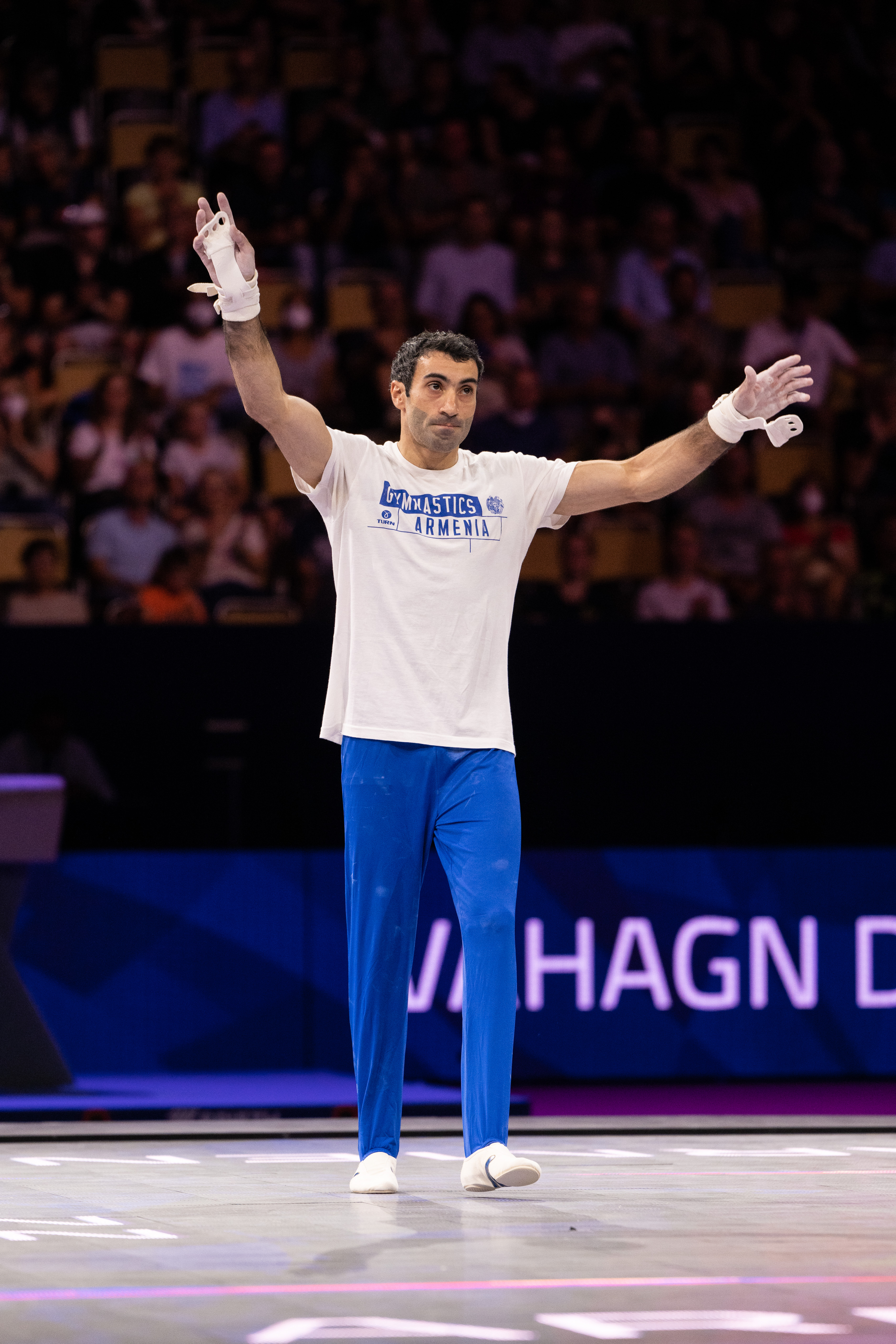
- Davtyan in 2022

Personal information
- Full name: Vahagn Davtyan
- Born: 18 August 1988 (age 38) Yerevan, Armenian SSR, Soviet Union
- Relatives: Artur Davtyan (brother)

Gymnastics career
- Discipline: Men's artistic gymnastics
- Country represented: Armenia
- Head coaches: Hakob Serobyan; Harutyun Merdinyan
- Assistant coach: Hayk Nazaryan
Medal record
Men's artistic gymnastics
Representing Armenia
European Championships
Silver medal – second place	2016 Bern	Rings
Silver medal – second place	2023 Antalya	Rings
Bronze medal – third place	2019 Szczecin	Rings
European Games
Silver medal – second place	2019 Minsk	Rings
FIG World Cup
Event	1st	2nd	3rd
Apparatus World Cup	4	3	2
World Challenge Cup	0	3	0
Total	4	6	2

Vahagn Davtyan (Armenian: Վահագն Դավթյան, born August 18, 1988) is an Armenian gymnast and member of the Armenian national team. He is a three-time European medalist and one-time European Games medalist on rings. He represented Armenia at the 2024 Summer Olympics.

== Early life ==
Vahagn Davtyan was born on August 18, 1988, in Yerevan, Armenian SSR. He took up gymnastics in 1994 at the age of six. He is the brother of fellow national gymnastics team member Artur Davtyan.

== Gymnastics career ==
=== 2010–2014 ===
Davtyan competed at the 2010 European Championships where he placed fourth on rings. At the 2011 World Championships he placed 23rd on rings during qualifications and did not qualify to the final. At the 2012 European Championships Davtyan placed eighth on rings. At the 2014 European Championships he placed fifth.

=== 2015–2016 ===
In 2015 Davtyan competed at the Doha Challenge Cup where he finished fourth on rings. He next competed at the 2015 European Championships where he finished fifth on rings. At the 2015 World Championships, Davtyan qualified to his first World final on rings. He finished seventh overall.

Davtyan competed at the Doha World Cup in 2016. While there, he won silver on rings. At the 2016 European Championships Davtyan won his first European Championships medal, a silver on rings.

=== 2022–2024 ===
Davtyan competed at the 2022 World Cups in Cottbus, Doha, and Cairo, where he won silver and two golds. As a result of his performances, he was the 2022 World Cup series winner on rings. He next competed at the 2022 European Championships where he placed fourth on rings. At the 2022 World Championships, Davtyan qualified to the rings final where he finished sixth.

Davtyan competed at the 2023 European Championships where he won silver on rings behind reigning world champion on the event Adem Asil. At the 2023 World Championships he finished fourth on rings.

Davtyan competed at the 2024 World Cups in Cairo, Cottbus, and Doha, finishing second, third, and first, respectively. His results earned him an individual berth to the 2024 Olympic Games in Paris. At the Olympic Games, he qualified for the rings final. In doing so, he became the first Armenian gymnast to qualify to an Olympic rings final. During the final, he placed sixth.

== Personal life ==
Davtyan is married with one son. Outside of gymnastics he works as the Deputy Head of the Department of Sports and Youth Affairs of the Yerevan Municipality.

== Competitive history ==
Competitive history of Vahagn Davtyan
Year	Event	Team	AA	FX	PH	SR	VT	PB	HB
2010
2010	European Championships					4			
2011	Doha Challenge Cup					5			
2011	World Championships					23			
2012	Doha Challenge Cup					2nd place, silver medalist(s)			
2012	European Championships					8			
2014	Doha Challenge Cup					2nd place, silver medalist(s)			
2014	European Championships					5			
2015	Doha Challenge Cup					4			
2015	European Championships					5			
2015	World Championships					7			
2016	Doha Challenge Cup					2nd place, silver medalist(s)			
2016	European Championships					2nd place, silver medalist(s)			
2017	Doha World Cup					4			
2017	European Championships					4			
2017	Paris Challenge Cup					6			
2017	World Championships					16			
2018
2018	European Championships					5			
2018	World Championships	32				6			
2019	Doha World Cup					3rd place, bronze medalist(s)			
2019	European Championships					3rd place, bronze medalist(s)			
2019	European Games					2nd place, silver medalist(s)			
2019	Cottbus World Cup					5			
2021
2021	European Championships					8			
2022	Cottbus World Cup					2nd place, silver medalist(s)			
2022	Doha World Cup					1st place, gold medalist(s)			
2022	Cairo World Cup					1st place, gold medalist(s)			
2022	European Championships					4			
2022	World Championships					6			
2023	Cottbus World Cup					4			
2023	Doha World Cup					7			
2023	European Championships					2nd place, silver medalist(s)			
2023	World Championships					4			
2024	Cairo World Cup					2nd place, silver medalist(s)			
2024	Cottbus World Cup					3rd place, bronze medalist(s)			
2024	Doha World Cup					1st place, gold medalist(s)			
2024	Olympic Games					6			
2024	Christmas Cup					3rd place, bronze medalist(s)			
2025	Cottbus World Cup					1st place, gold medalist(s)			
2025	Antalya World Cup					7			
2025	Osijek World Cup					7			
2025	Doha World Cup					2nd place, silver medalist(s)			
2025	Cairo World Cup					7			
2025	European Championships					7			
2025	World Championships					19			
2026
2026	European Championships					5			
