= Artur Davtyan =

Armenian artistic gymnast (born 1992)

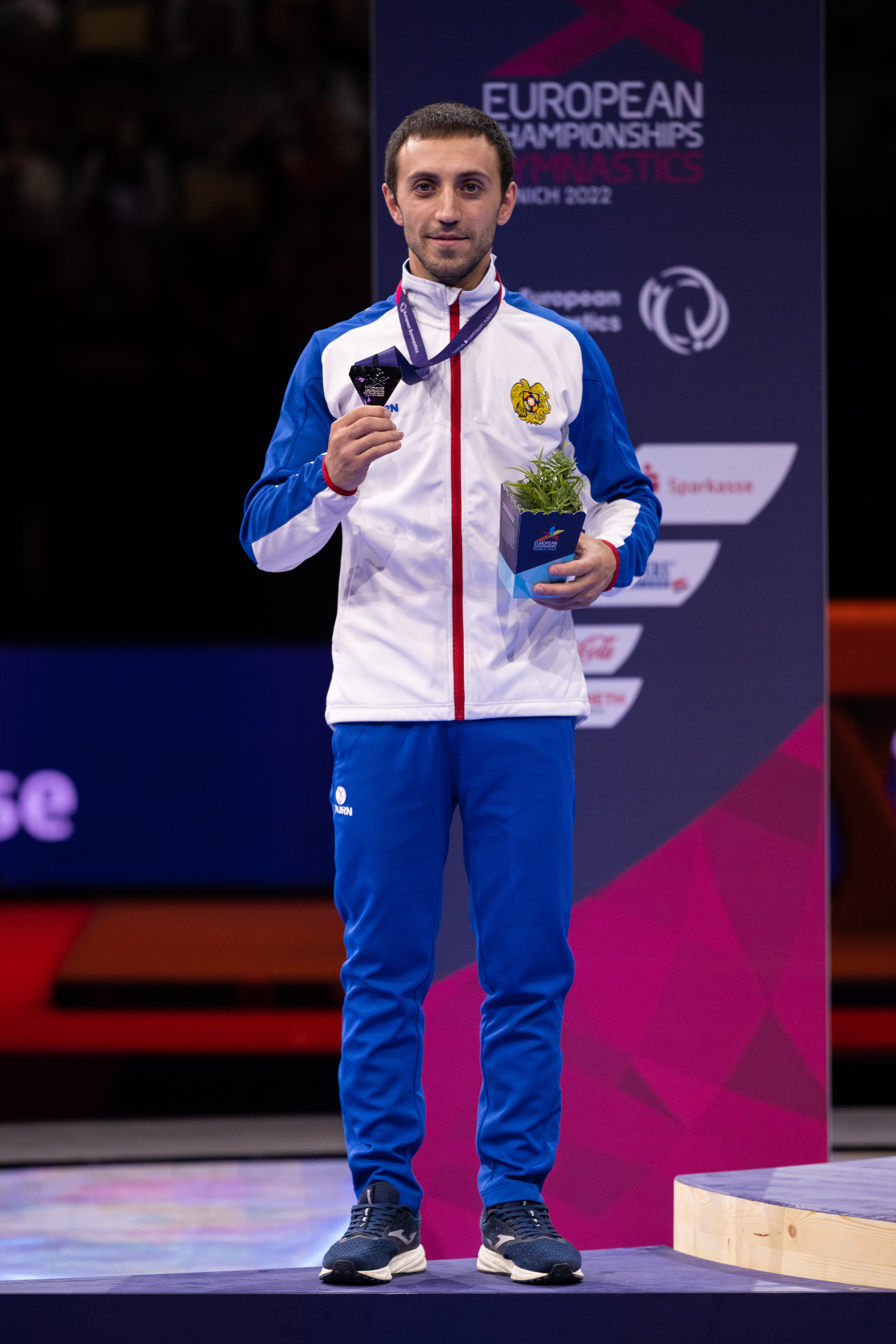
- Davtyan at the 2022 European Championships

Personal information
- Born: 8 August 1992 (age 34) Yerevan, Armenia
- Height: 1.62 m (5 ft 4 in)
- Relatives: Vahagn Davtyan (brother)

Gymnastics career
- Discipline: Men's artistic gymnastics
- Country represented: Armenia; (2008–present)
- Head coach: Hakob Serobyan
Medal record
Men's artistic gymnastics
Representing Armenia
Event	1st	2nd	3rd
Olympic Games	0	1	1
World Championships	2	1	0
European Championships	3	3	2
European Games	1	0	0
Total	6	5	3
Olympic Games
Silver medal – second place	2024 Paris	Vault
Bronze medal – third place	2020 Tokyo	Vault
World Championships
Gold medal – first place	2022 Liverpool	Vault
Gold medal – first place	2026 Rotterdam	Vault
Silver medal – second place	2025 Jakarta	Vault
European Championships
Gold medal – first place	2021 Basel	Pommel Horse
Gold medal – first place	2023 Antalya	Vault
Gold medal – first place	2025 Leipzig	Vault
Silver medal – second place	2016 Bern	Vault
Silver medal – second place	2022 Munich	Vault
Silver medal – second place	2024 Rimini	Vault
Bronze medal – third place	2013 Moscow	Vault
Bronze medal – third place	2023 Antalya	Pommel Horse
European Games
Gold medal – first place	2019 Minsk	Vault
FIG World Cup
Event	1st	2nd	3rd
Apparatus World Cup	13	2	3
World Challenge Cup	4	3	4
Total	17	5	7

Artur Vahrami Davtyan (Armenian: Արթուր Դավթյան, born August 8, 1992) is an Armenian gymnast. He is the 2020 Olympic bronze medalist, 2024 Olympic silver medalist and the 2022 and 2026 World Champion on vault. He is also the 2019 European Games vault champion and is an eight-time European Championships medalist.

== Early life ==
Artur Davtyan was born on August 8, 1992, in Yerevan, Armenia. He started doing gymnastics at the age of 7 in 1998. Since 2008, he has been a member of the Armenian national gymnastics team. He is the brother of fellow national team member Vahagn Davtyan.

== Gymnastics career ==
=== 2009–2010 ===
At the 2009 Youth Olympic Festival in Tampere, Finland, Davtyan, along with fellow Armenians Vahan Vardanyan and Arthur Tovmasyan, placed sixth in the team event among 23 teams. Individually, Davtyan placed sixth in the all-around, seventh on vault, sixth on parallel bars, and ninth on rings.

The following year at the 2010 Junior European Championships, Davtyan won the title on vault with a score of 15.462 and won bronze on pommel horse. Additionally, he placed seventh on rings and nineteenth in the all-around.

=== 2011–2012 ===
Davtyan became age-eligible for senior-level competition in 2011. He made his senior debut at the 2011 European Championships where he placed twentieth in the all-around. He competed at the 2011 World Championships where he placed ninety-fifth in the qualification round and did not advance to any finals.

In January 2012, Davtyan took part in the Olympic Test Event where he earned his berth to compete at the 2012 Summer Olympics. He next competed at the Doha World Challenge Cup where he placed second on vault and fourth on pommel horse. Davtyan was awarded the Aspire Academy Award for best young gymnasts of the Doha World Cup. He shared the award with Diana Bulimar. He competed at the 2012 European Championships where he placed eleventh on vault but did not qualify for the event final. At the 2012 Olympic Games Davtyan finished fifteenth on vault and thirty-sixth in the all-around during the qualification round; he did not advance to any event final.

=== 2013–2016 ===
Davtyan won bronze on vault at the 2013 European Championships, his first senior-level European Championship medal. At the 2014 Doha World Challenge Cup, he won gold on vault, earning his first international title at the senior level. At the 2014 World Championships, he placed forty-fourth in the all-around during the qualification round.

At the 2015 Doha World Challenge Cup Davtyan won three medals: gold on vault, silver on rings, and bronze on pommel horse. He followed that up at the 2015 European Championships where he placed fourth on both vault and pommel horse. At the 2015 World Championships, Davtyan placed thirty-second in the all-around during the qualification round.

In early 2016 Davtyan competed at the Olympic Test Event where he earned his second Olympic berth. He followed that up at the 2016 European Championships where he won silver on vault, his second European Championships medal. At the 2016 Olympic Games, Davtyan finished eleventh on vault and was the third reserve for the vault final.

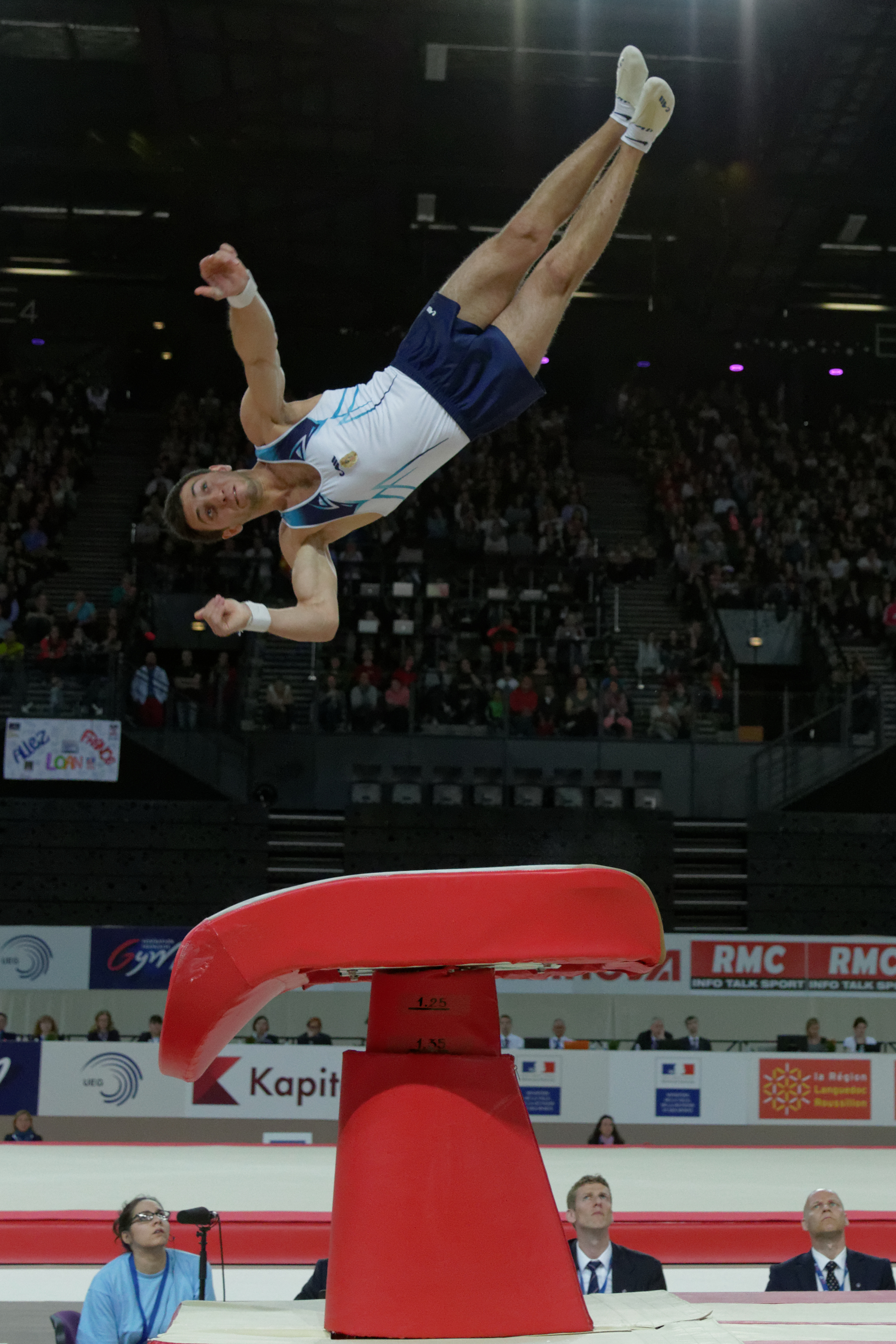
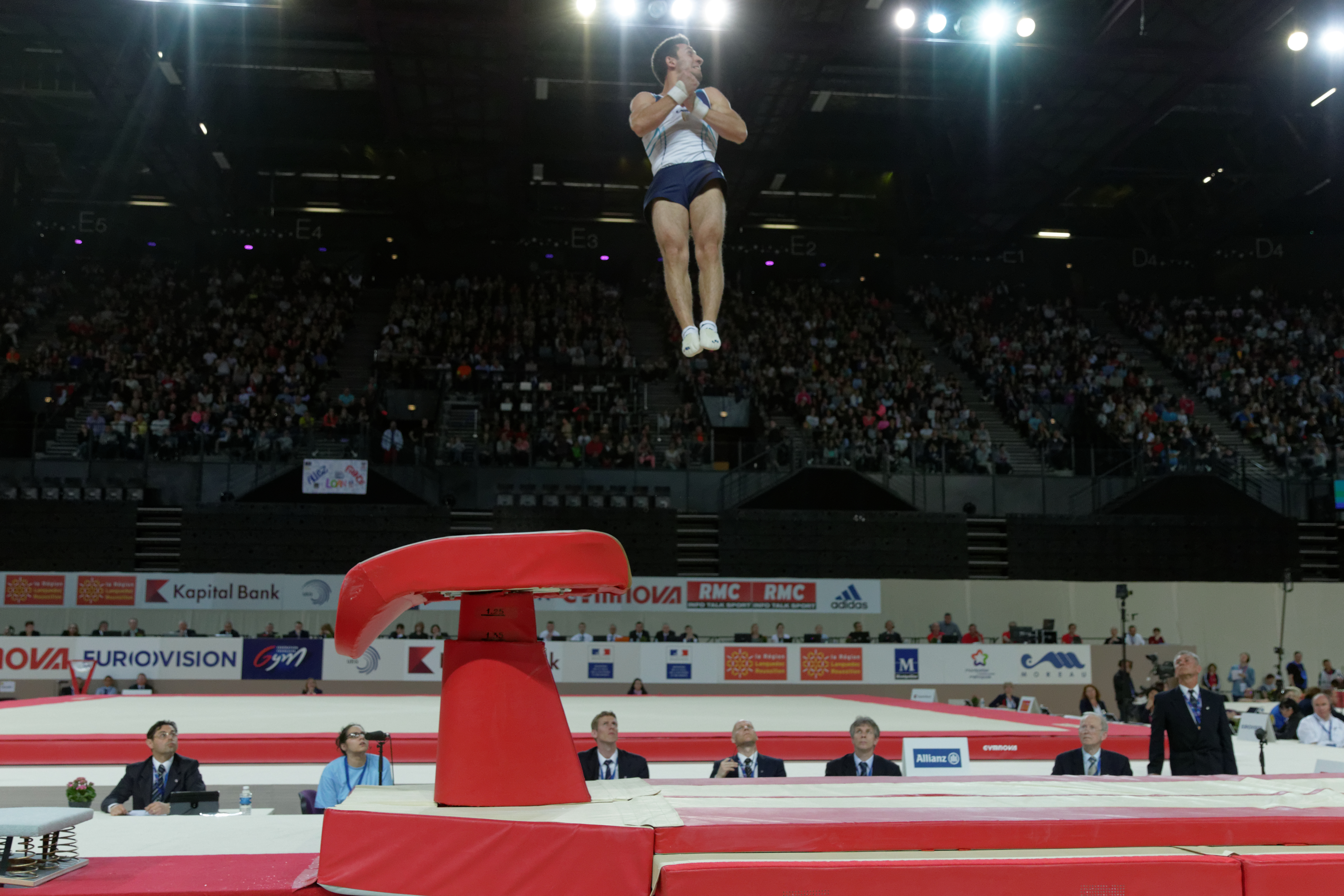
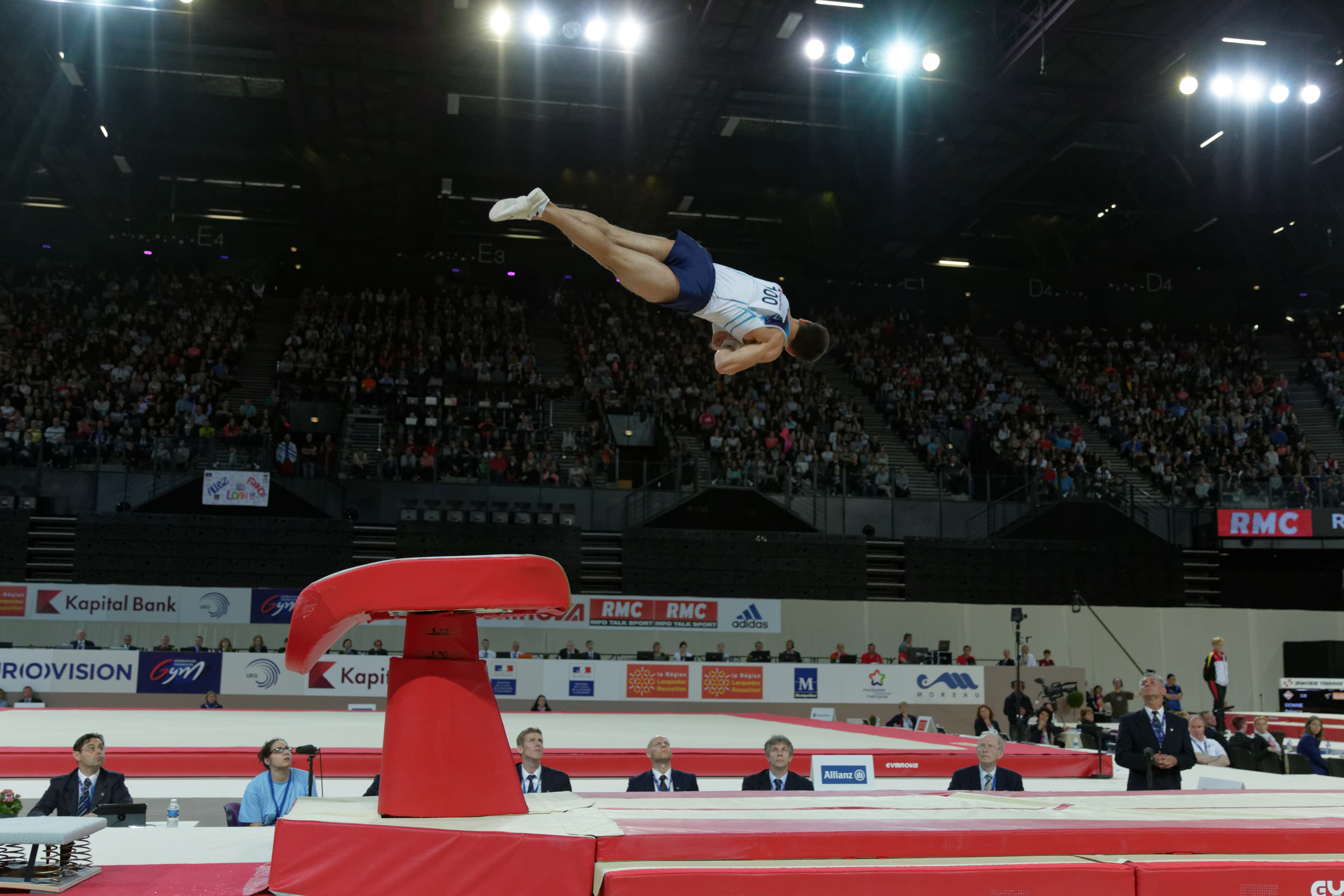
Davtyan vaulting at the 2015 European Championships

=== 2017–2021 ===
Davtyan competed at numerous World Cups throughout 2017, winning a silver on vault and a bronze on pommel horse in Doha. At the 2017 World Championships, he qualified to the all-around final, his first-ever World Championship event final, where he ultimately finished thirteenth.

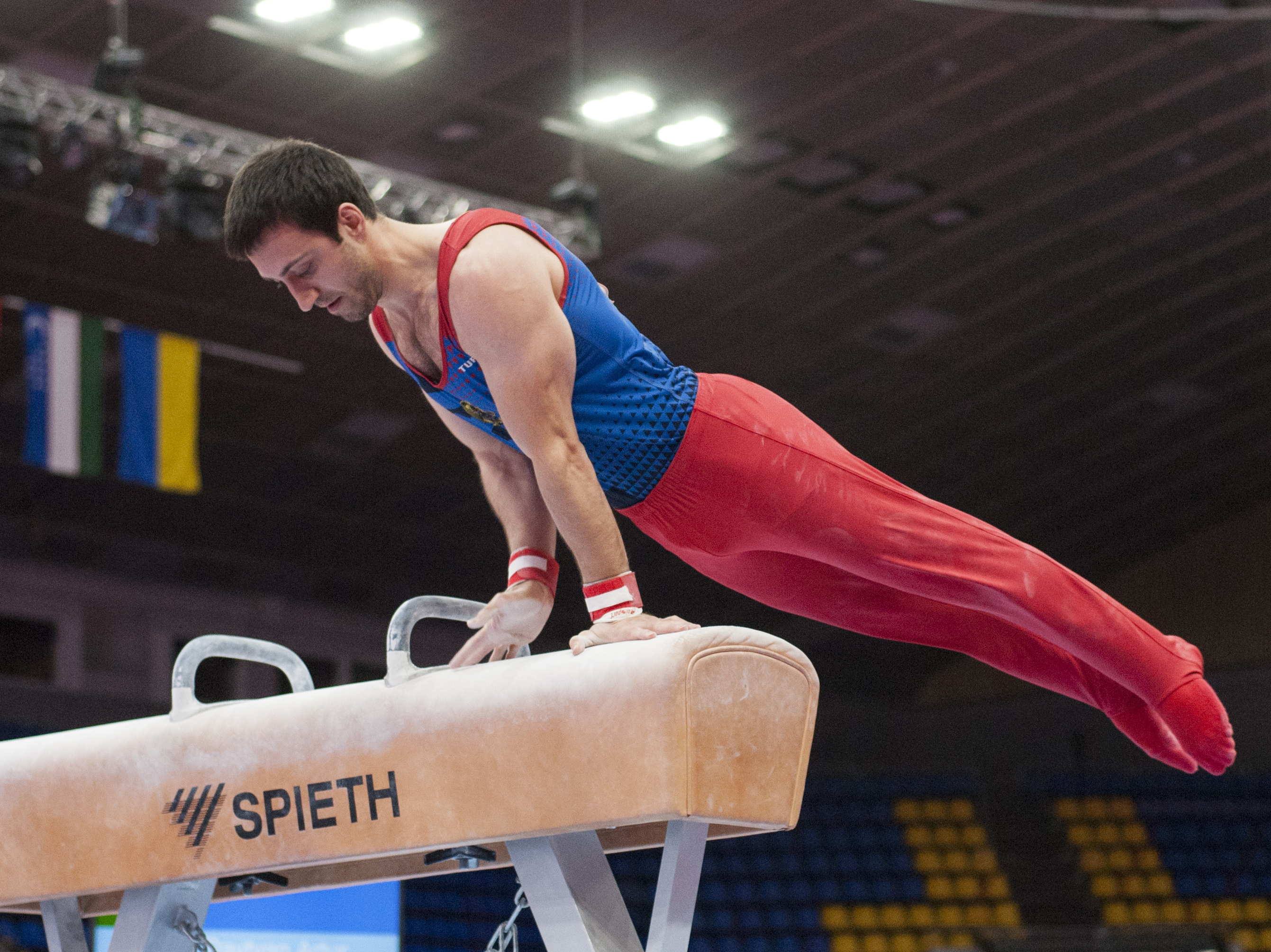
Davtyan competing on pommel horse in 2021

At the 2018 World Championships, Davtyan was initially the first reserve for the all-around final; however, Canadian René Cournoyer withdrew and Davtyan was substituted in. Additionally, he qualified for the vault final, his first apparatus final at a World Championships. He finished ninth in the all-around and seventh on vault.

Davtyan competed at the 2019 European Games where he won gold on vault. At the 2019 World Championships he finished thirty-seventh in the all-around during the qualification round, which earned him an individual berth to the 2020 Summer Olympics, marking his third Olympic appearance. The Olympic Games, however, were postponed until 2021 due to the global COVID-19 pandemic.

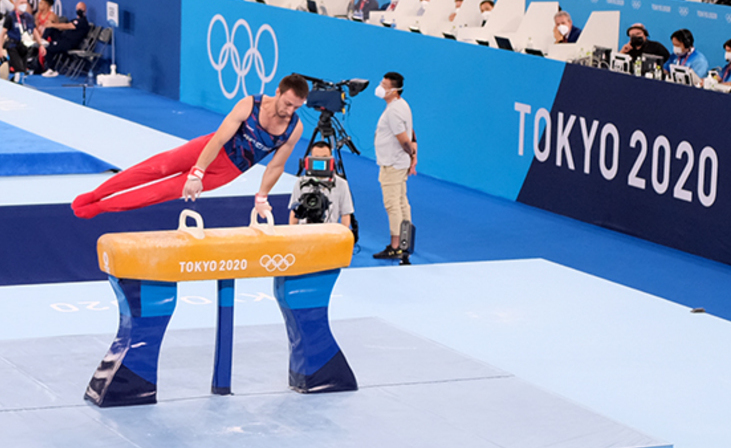
Davtyan on the pommel horse at the 2020 Olympic Games

At the 2021 European Championships, Davtyan won gold on pommel horse. At the 2021 Cairo World Cup, Davtyan performed a new pommel horse element, which was officially named after him in the Code of Points.

At the postponed 2020 Olympic Games, Davtyan won bronze on vault, earning both his first individual Olympic medal and the first Olympic medal for Armenia in artistic gymnastics. Davtyan's medal was also the first for Armenia at the 2020 Olympics.

=== 2022–2024 ===
At the 2022 World Cups in Cottbus, Doha, and Cairo, Davtyan won gold on vault at each. At the 2022 European Championships, he won silver on vault behind Jake Jarman. He ended the year at the 2022 World Championships, where he won his first World title on vault and the first World title in artistic gymnastics for an independent Armenia.

Throughout 2023, Davtyan once again won gold on vault at the World Cups in Cottbus, Doha, and Cairo. Additionally, he won gold on vault at the World Challenge Cups in Varna and Osijek and at the 2023 European Championships. At the 2023 World Championships, he qualified to the vault final in third place; however, during the final he messed up on his first vault and ultimately finished in sixth. Additionally, he finished in sixteenth in the all-around during the qualification round, which earned him an Olympic berth to his fourth Olympic Games; he withdrew from the final in order to focus on the apparatus finals.

Davtyan started 2024 competing at the World Cups in Cairo and Cottbus, where he won gold on vault. At the 2024 European Championships, he won silver on vault behind Jarman. At the 2024 Olympic Games, Davtyan won silver on vault behind Carlos Yulo of the Philippines, earning his second Olympic medal and the first medal for Armenia at the 2024 Olympics.

=== 2025–present ===
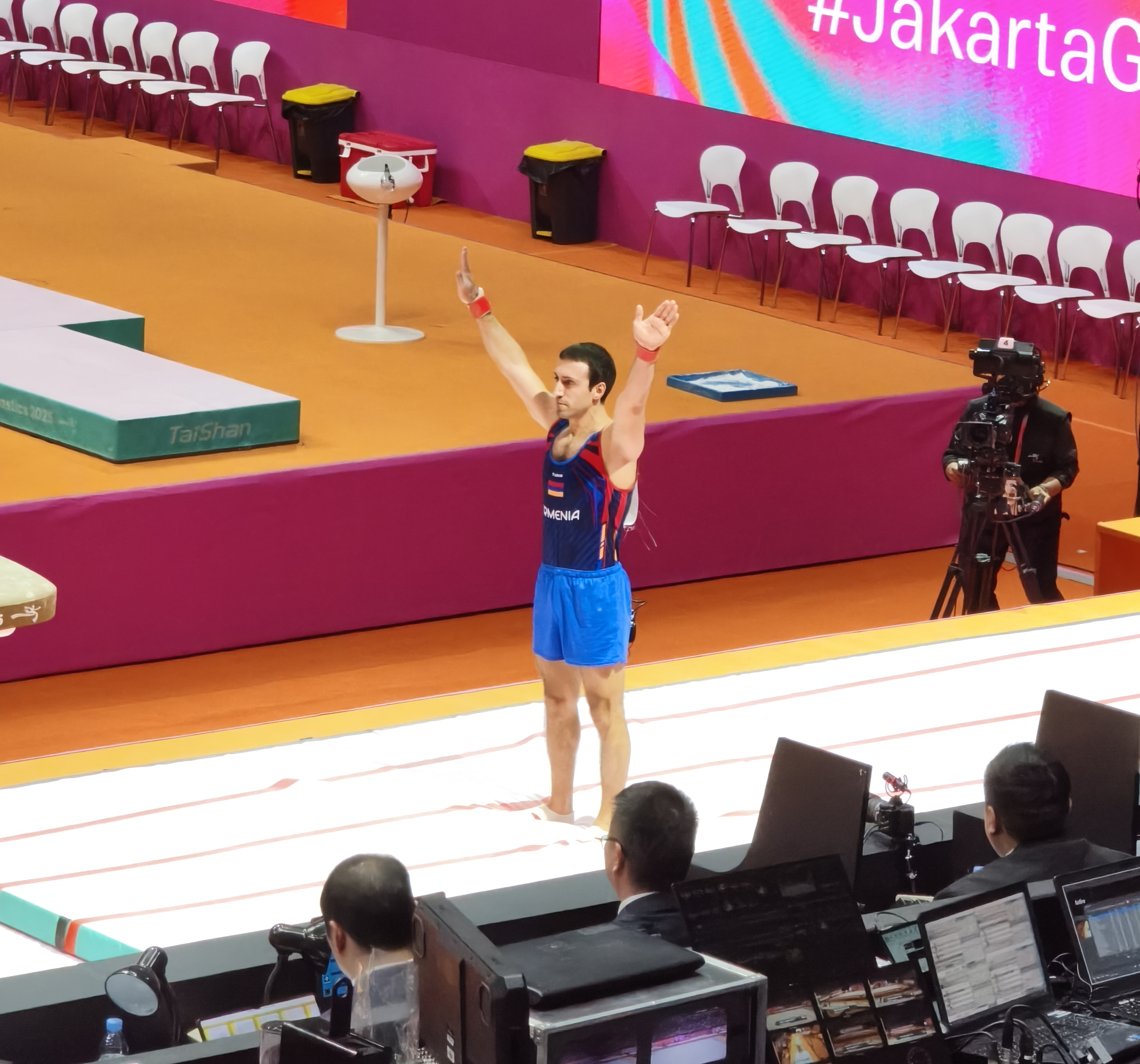
Davtyan at the 2025 World Championships

Davtyan began 2025 competing at numerous World Cups, winning four gold medals and one bronze medal on vault. He won gold on vault at the 2025 European Championships, beating Jarman and Nazar Chepurnyi. At the 2025 World Championships, he won silver on vault, once again behind Yulo.

Davtyan competed at the 2026 World Cups in Cottbus, Cairo, and Osijek; he won gold on vault in Cairo and silver in Osijek. At the 2026 European Championships, Davtyan qualified to the vault final in first place. During the final, he experienced back pain after his first vault which led to him balking his second vault and ending the competition in eighth place. At the 2026 World Championships, Davtyan won his second World title on vault.

== Eponymous skills ==
Apparatus	Name	Description	Difficulty	Added to Code of Points
Pommel horse	Davtyan	Reverse Stockli with 270 degree turn (Bezugo technique) from side support on two pommels to one pommel	C (0.3)	2022 Cairo World Cup

== Competitive history ==
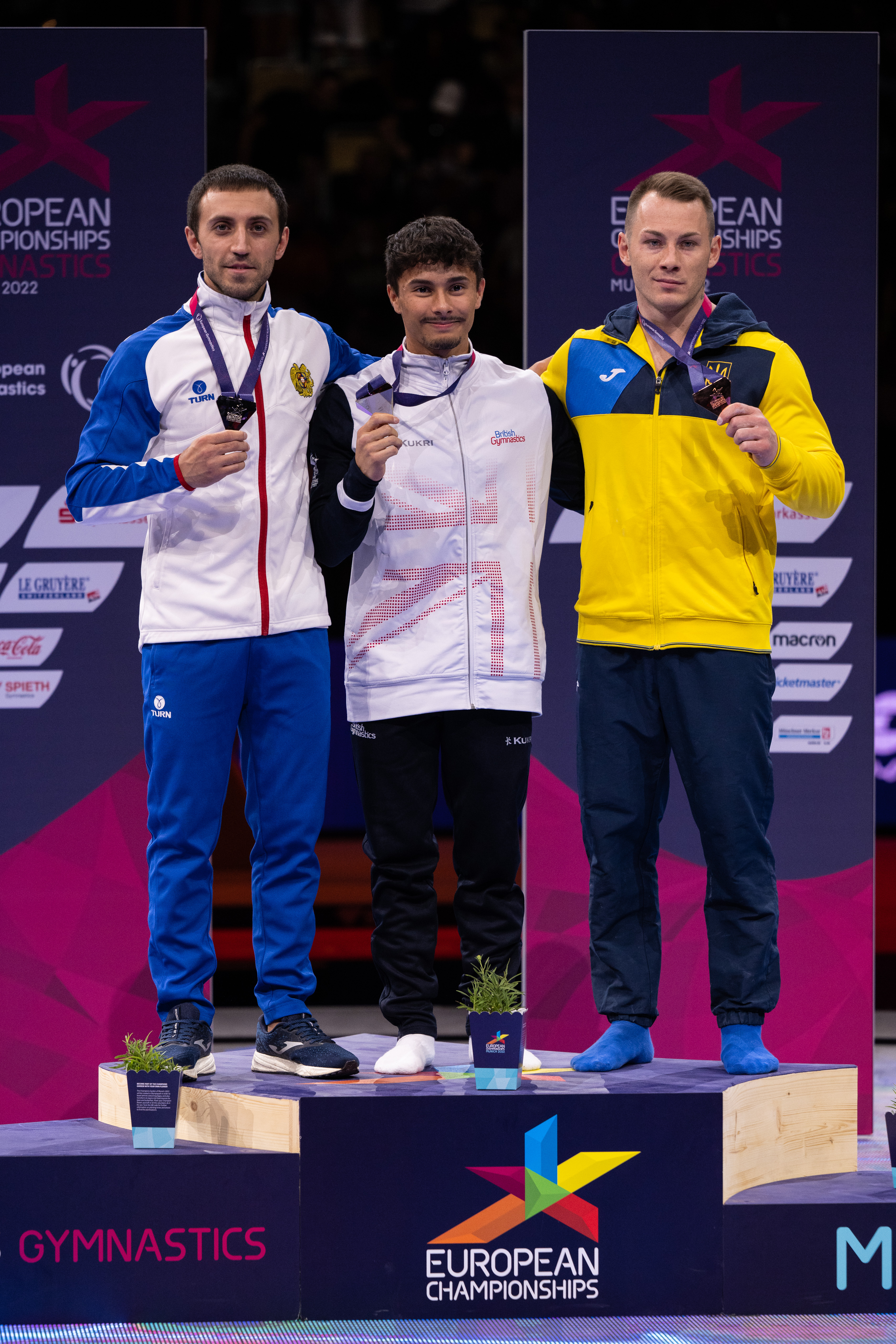
Davtyan (left) on the vault podium at the 2022 European Championships

Competitive history of Artur Davtyan
Year	Event	Team	AA	FX	PH	SR	VT	PB	HB
2009	European Youth Olympic Festival	6	6			5	8	6	
2010
2010	Junior European Championships		19		3rd place, bronze medalist(s)	7	1st place, gold medalist(s)		
2011
2011	European Championships		20						
2011	World Championships		95						
2012	Olympic test event		36				6		
2012	Doha Challenge Cup						2nd place, silver medalist(s)		
2012	Olympic Games		36						
2013	Doha Challenge Cup						3rd place, bronze medalist(s)		
2013	European Championships		8				3rd place, bronze medalist(s)		
2014	Doha Challenge Cup						1st place, gold medalist(s)		
2014	European Championships	35							
2014	World Championships		44						
2015	Doha Challenge Cup				3rd place, bronze medalist(s)	2nd place, silver medalist(s)	1st place, gold medalist(s)		
2015	European Championships		4				4		
2015	World Championships		32						
2016	Doha Challenge Cup						4		
2016	Olympic test event		13						
2016	European Championships						2nd place, silver medalist(s)		
2016	Olympic Games						R3		
2017	Doha World Cup			4	3rd place, bronze medalist(s)		2nd place, silver medalist(s)	8	
2017	European Championships		6				5		
2017	Summer Universiade		5		4		7		
2017	Paris Challenge Cup					8	6		
2017	World Championships		13						
2018
2018	European Championships				R1				
2018	World Championships	32	9				7		
2019	Doha World Cup						3rd place, bronze medalist(s)		
2019	European Championships		8						
2019	European Games		5	6			1st place, gold medalist(s)		
2019	World Championships		37						
2021
2021	European Championships				1st place, gold medalist(s)		6		
2021	Olympic Games						3rd place, bronze medalist(s)		
2022	Cottbus World Cup						1st place, gold medalist(s)		
2022	Doha World Cup						1st place, gold medalist(s)		
2022	Cairo World Cup			7			1st place, gold medalist(s)		6
2022	European Championships				6		2nd place, silver medalist(s)		
2022	World Championships						1st place, gold medalist(s)		
2023	Cottbus World Cup						1st place, gold medalist(s)		
2023	Doha World Cup						1st place, gold medalist(s)		
2023	Cairo World Cup					7	1st place, gold medalist(s)		
2023	European Championships		4		3rd place, bronze medalist(s)		1st place, gold medalist(s)		
2023	Varna Challenge Cup			6	3rd place, bronze medalist(s)	3rd place, bronze medalist(s)	1st place, gold medalist(s)	5	
2023	Osijek Challenge Cup				2nd place, silver medalist(s)		1st place, gold medalist(s)	8	
2023	World Championships		WD				6		
2024	Cairo World Cup						1st place, gold medalist(s)		
2024	Cottbus World Cup						1st place, gold medalist(s)		
2024	European Championships						2nd place, silver medalist(s)		
2024	Olympic Games						2nd place, silver medalist(s)		
2024	Voronin Cup	2nd place, silver medalist(s)	1st place, gold medalist(s)	2nd place, silver medalist(s)	2nd place, silver medalist(s)	2nd place, silver medalist(s)	1st place, gold medalist(s)		
2025	Cottbus World Cup						1st place, gold medalist(s)		
2025	Antalya World Cup						1st place, gold medalist(s)		
2025	Osijek World Cup						3rd place, bronze medalist(s)		
2025	Doha World Cup						1st place, gold medalist(s)		
2025	Cairo World Cup						1st place, gold medalist(s)		
2025	European Championships						1st place, gold medalist(s)		
2025	World Championships	—N/a					2nd place, silver medalist(s)		
2025	Arthur Gander Memorial		4						
2026	Cottbus World Cup					5			
2026	Cairo World Cup					4	1st place, gold medalist(s)		
2026	Osijek World Cup						2nd place, silver medalist(s)		
2026	European Championships						8		
2026	World Championships						1st place, gold medalist(s)		
