= Varsenik Manucharyan =

Armenian swimmer (born 2003)

Personal information
- Native name: Վարսենիկ Մանուչարյան
- Born: 11 July 2003 (age 23) Yerevan, Armenia

Sport
- Sport: Swimming

Varsenik Manucharyan (Armenian: Վարսենիկ Մանուչարյան; born 11 July 2003) is an Armenian swimmer. In 2021, she competed in the women's 100 metre freestyle event at the 2020 Summer Olympics held in Tokyo, Japan.

== Career ==
In 2019, she represented Armenia at the 2019 World Aquatics Championships held in Gwangju, South Korea. She competed in the women's 50 metre freestyle event. She did not advance to compete in the semi-finals. She also competed in the women's 50 metre butterfly event and two mixed relay events: 4 × 100 metre mixed freestyle relay and 4 × 100 metre mixed medley relay.
