= Artur Barseghyan =

Armenian swimmer

Personal information
- Native name: Արթուր Բարսեղյան
- Nationality: Armenian
- Born: 29 March 2002 (age 22); Yerevan, Armenia

Sport
- Sport: Swimming

Artur Barseghyan (Armenian: Արթուր Բարսեղյան; born 29 March 2002) is an Armenian swimmer. He competed in the men's 50 metre freestyle event at the 2018 FINA World Swimming Championships (25 m), in Hangzhou, China.
