= Ani Poghosyan =

Armenian swimmer (born 2000)

Personal information
- Born: 4 June 2000 (age 26)
- Height: 177

Sport
- Sport: Swimming
- Strokes: freestyle, backstroke

Ani Poghosyan (born 4 June 2000) is an Armenian swimmer. She became Master of Sports aged 13. Ani Poghosyan is a record holder of 100m (short course and long course) 200m (short course and long course) 400m (short course and long course) and 800m freestyle. She competed in the women's 100 metre freestyle event at the 2017 World Aquatics Championships.

In 2019, she represented Armenia at the 2019 World Aquatics Championships held in Gwangju, South Korea. She competed in the women's 100 metre freestyle and women's 200 metre freestyle events. She also competed in two mixed relay events.
