= Lev Sargsyan =

Armenian diver

Personal information
- Nationality: Armenian
- Born: 12 October 1996 (age 29)

Sport
- Country: Armenia
- Sport: Diving
Medal record
European Championships
Bronze medal – third place	2018 Glasgow	10 m synchro

Lev Sargsyan (born 12 October 1996) is an Armenian diver. He competed in the men's 10 m synchro platform event at the 2018 European Aquatics Championships, winning the bronze medal. He and his partner Vladimir Harutyunyan won the first medal for Armenia at the European Aquatics Championships.
