= Vahan Mkhitaryan =

Armenian swimmer

Personal information
- Born: 16 August 1996 (age 29) Yerevan, Armenia
- Height: 186 cm (6 ft 1 in)
- Weight: 92 kg (203 lb)

Sport
- Sport: Swimming
- Strokes: Freestyle

Vahan Mkhitaryan (Armenian: Վահան Մխիթարյան; born 16 August 1996) is an Armenian swimmer. He competed in the men's 50 metre freestyle event at the 2016 Summer Olympics. He finished 47th in the heats and did not qualify for the semifinals. He was the flag bearer for Armenia during the Parade of Nations.
