= Vladimir Harutyunyan =

Armenian diver

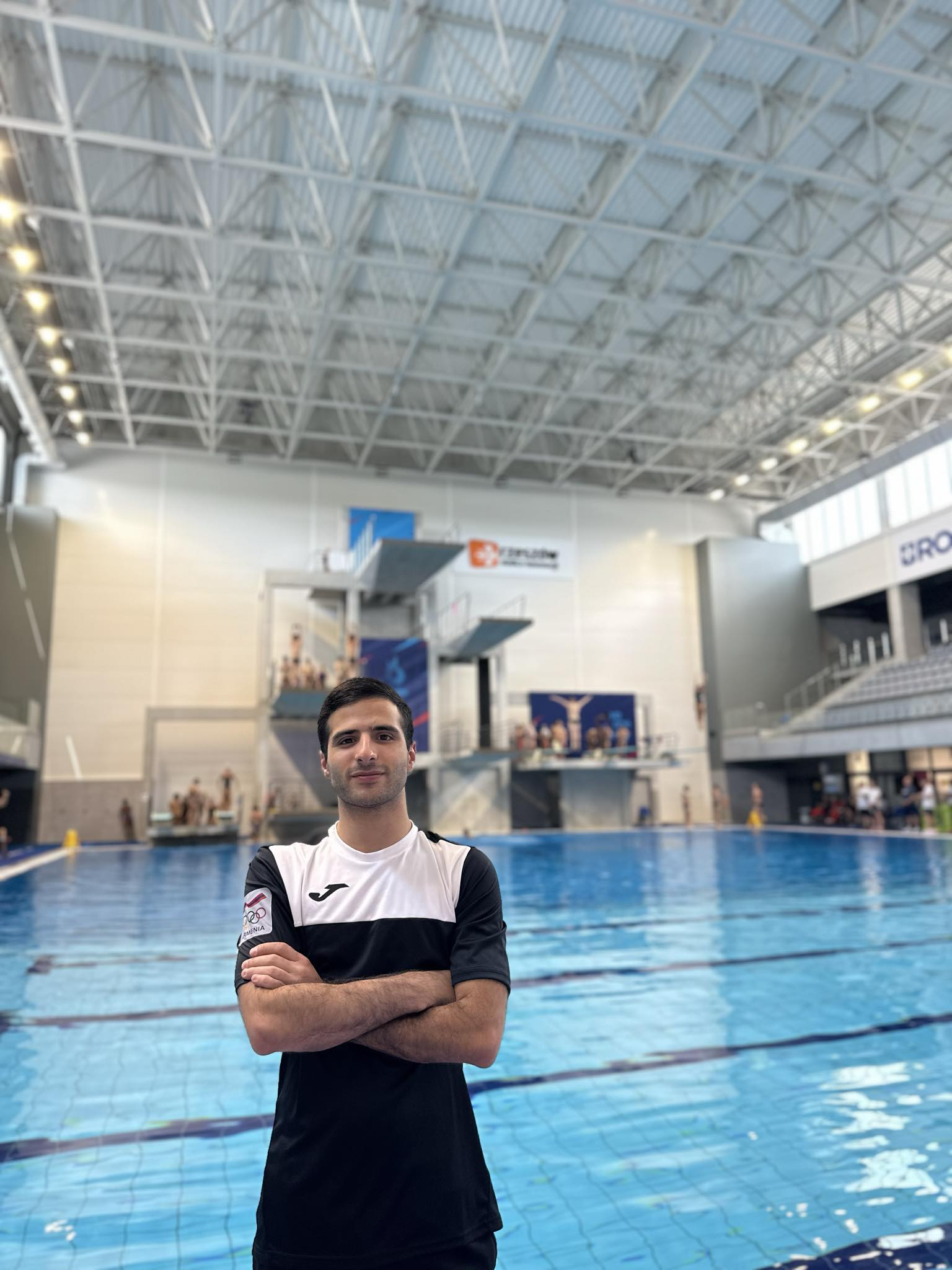
- Vladimir Harutyunyan

Personal information
- Nationality: Armenian
- Born: 18 July 1998 (age 27)

Sport
- Country: Armenia
- Sport: Diving
Medal record
European Championships
Bronze medal – third place	2018 Glasgow	10 m synchro

Vladimir Harutyunyan (born 18 July 1998) is an Armenian diver. He competed in the men's 10 m synchro platform event at the 2018 European Aquatics Championships, winning the bronze medal. He and his partner Lev Sargsyan won the first medal for Armenia at the European Aquatics Championships.
