= Ángel Barajas =

Colombian gymnast

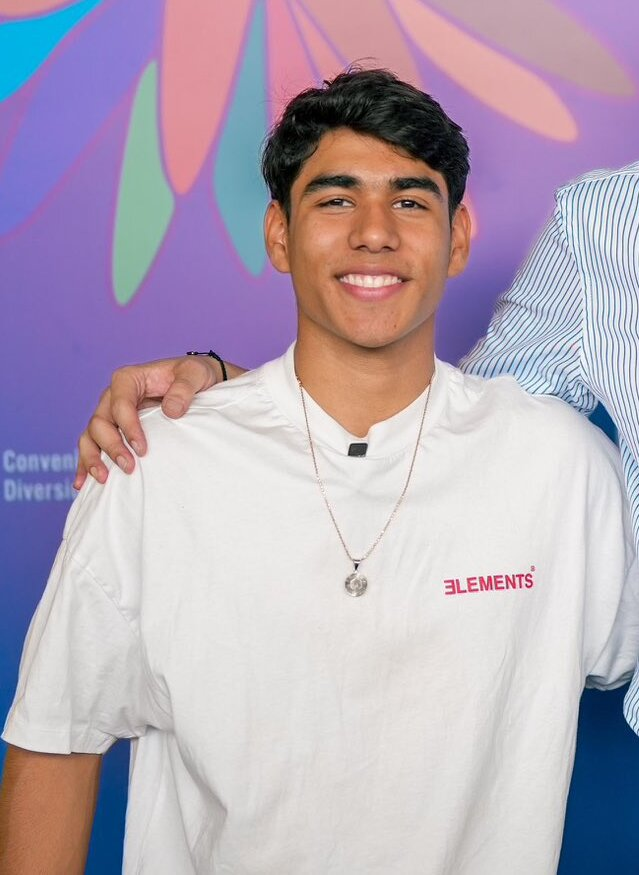
- Barajas in 2024

Personal information
- Full name: Ángel Gabriel Barajas Vivas
- Born: 12 August 2006 (age 20) Cúcuta, Colombia
- Height: 1.68 m (5 ft 6 in)

Gymnastics career
- Discipline: Men's artistic gymnastics
- Country represented: Colombia; (2018–present)
- Club: Liga Norte de Santander
- Head coach: Jairo Ruiz
- Assistant coach: Jossimar Calvo
Medal record
Men's artistic gymnastics
Representing Colombia
Olympic Games
Silver medal – second place	2024 Paris	Horizontal bar
Pan American Championships
Gold medal – first place	2026 Rio de Janeiro	Horizontal bar
Silver medal – second place	2026 Rio de Janeiro	Team
Silver medal – second place	2026 Rio de Janeiro	All-around
Silver medal – second place	2026 Rio de Janeiro	Floor exercise
Bronze medal – third place	2026 Rio de Janeiro	Pommel horse
Central American and Caribbean Games
Gold medal – first place	2026 Santo Domingo	Team
Gold medal – first place	2026 Santo Domingo	All-around
Gold medal – first place	2026 Santo Domingo	Parallel bars
Gold medal – first place	2026 Santo Domingo	Horizontal bar
Silver medal – second place	2026 Santo Domingo	Rings
South American Games
Gold medal – first place	2026 Santa Fe	Pommel horse
Gold medal – first place	2026 Santa Fe	Parallel bars
Gold medal – first place	2026 Santa Fe	Horizontal bar
Silver medal – second place	2026 Santa Fe	Team
Silver medal – second place	2026 Santa Fe	Rings
Junior World Championships
Gold medal – first place	2023 Antalya	Floor exercise
Gold medal – first place	2023 Antalya	Parallel bars
Silver medal – second place	2023 Antalya	All-around
Bronze medal – third place	2023 Antalya	Horizontal bar
FIG World Cup
Event	1st	2nd	3rd
World Cup	2	3	5
World Challenge Cup	0	2	0
Total	2	5	5

Signature
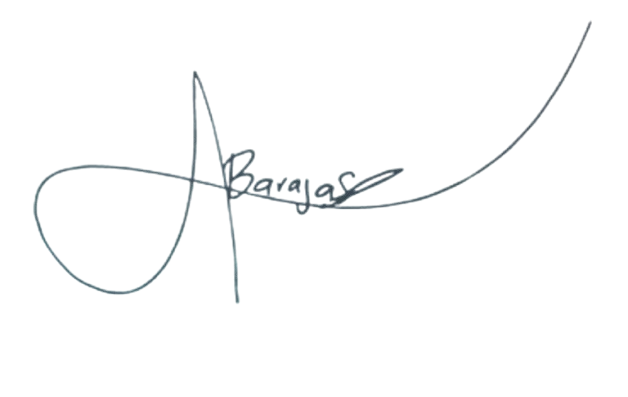

Ángel Gabriel Barajas Vivas (Note: In this Spanish name, the first or paternal surname is Barajas and the second or maternal family name is Vivas.) (born 12 August 2006) is a Colombian artistic gymnast. He is the first Colombian gymnast to win an Olympic medal, earning a silver medal on the horizontal bar at the 2024 Olympic Games. Barajas is also the 2022 South American Youth Games champion and the 2023 Junior World all-around silver medalist.

== Early life ==
Barajas was born in Cúcuta, Norte de Santander, to Angélica María Vivas and Wilson Barajas. He has two older siblings. His father left the family when Barajas was six years old.

== Gymnastics career ==
When Barajas was three years old, he began imitating Sportacus, a character from the Icelandic television show LazyTown, who performed flashy handstands and backflips on the show. He began gymnastics training when he was five years old, at a local club in Cúcuta. His older brother, Jeisson, worked two jobs to pay for Barajas' gymnastics training.

Since 2018, Barajas has been training with the Norte de Santander Gymnastics League alongside gymnasts like Jossimar Calvo. In 2019 Barajas joined the Colombian Sports Ministry's Athletic Excellence program, which paid him a monthly salary.

=== 2021 ===
In 2021, Barajas competed at the Junior Pan American Championships, where he helped Colombia secure second place as a team. Individually, he won bronze medals in the all-around, floor exercise, and horizontal bar, and he claimed gold on the pommel horse.

=== 2022 ===
In late April, Barajas participated in the South American Youth Games, leading Colombia to team gold. He individually won gold in six of the seven events, missing out only on rings. In July, at the Pan American Championships, he helped Colombia finish fourth as a team. Individually, he won gold on the horizontal bar, silver in the all-around, floor exercise, and vault, and bronze on parallel bars.

=== 2023 ===
In late March, Barajas competed at the second Junior World Championships as the lone male Colombian delegate. On the first day, he qualified for the all-around final in first place and also made it to the finals for floor exercise, parallel bars, and horizontal bar. In the all-around final, he won silver, finishing behind Qin Guohuan of China. In the apparatus finals, Barajas secured gold medals on floor exercise and parallel bars, and a bronze on horizontal bar. With four medals, he left Antalya as the most decorated athlete.

=== 2024 ===
Barajas became eligible for senior competition in 2024. He made his senior debut at the Cairo World Cup in mid-February, where he qualified for the parallel bars and horizontal bar finals. He won bronze on the horizontal bar, finishing behind Tang Chia-hung and Joe Fraser, and placed eighth on parallel bars. At the conclusion of the World Cup series, Barajas earned an individual Olympic berth for the upcoming Olympic Games in Paris.

At the Olympic Games, Barajas competed in the parallel bars and horizontal bar. During qualifications, he qualified for the horizontal bar final and was the third reserve for the parallel bars final. On the final day of competition for artistic gymnastics, Barajas scored 14.533 on the horizontal bar—the highest score of the day. However, he lost the execution score tie-breaker to Shinnosuke Oka, earning the silver medal. This achievement made Barajas the first Colombian gymnast to win an Olympic medal.

After winning the Olympic silver medal, Barajas was awarded a full scholarship to attend the University of Santander and was also given an apartment in Cúcuta. For his Olympic feat Barajas was named Athlete of the Year by the Colombian Olympic Committee.

=== 2025 ===
Barajas competed at the 2025 Pan American Championships where he finished fifth on horizontal bar and seventh in the all-around, on rings, and on parallel bars. In September he competed at the World Challenge Cups in Paris and Szombathely. At the former he won silver on parallel bars behind Joe Fraser and placed fifth on horizontal bar and at the latter he won silver on horizontal bar behind Milad Karimi. Barajas ended the season competing at the 2025 World Championships where he qualified to the all-around and parallel bars finals. He placed sixth in the all-around, earning Colombia's best all-around placement at a World Championships, beating Jossimar Calvo's tenth-place finish in 2014, and placed fourth on parallel bars.

=== 2026 ===
Barajas began the year competing at the 2026 Cottbus World Cup where he won silver on horizontal bar behind Shohei Kawakami. At the Baku World Cup, Barajas won his first World Cup gold, doing so on the parallel bars. Additionally he won bronze on horizontal bar. At the Antalya World Cup, Barajas won a pair of silver medals on the parallel bars and horizontal bar. Barajas ended the World Cup series winning gold on parallel bars and bronze on horizontal bar in Osijek. As a result, he was the overall series winner on the parallel bars.

At the 2026 Pan American Championships, Barajas helped Colombia win silver behind Canada. Individually, Barajas qualified for the all-around final in first place and additionally qualified for all apparatus event finals besides vault. During the all-around final Barajas was leading going into the final rotation but fell on horizontal bar and ended up winning silver behind teammate Camilo Vera. During event finals Barajas won silver on floor exercise behind Jorge Vega, bronze on pommel horse behind Patrick Hoopes and Jordan Carroll, and ended the competition winning gold on horizontal bar after earning a score 15.233, over one point ahead of second-place finisher Diogo Soares. Additionally he placed eighth on rings and sixth on parallel bars. Barajas next competed at the 2026 Central American and Caribbean Games where he helped Colombia win team gold. Individually he won gold in the all-around ahead of teammate Vera, silver on rings behind Francisco Vélez of Puerto Rico, and gold on parallel bars and horizontal bar ahead of teammate Yan Zabala on both.

At the 2026 World Championships, Barajas led Colombia to qualify for their first team final in history where they ultimately finished eighth. Individually he qualified for the all-around and horizontal bar finals. During the all-around final he finished fifth, besting his sixth place finish from the previous year to once again achieve the highest placement in a World all-around final for a Colombian. In finishing fifth, Barajas also tied Sérgio Sasaki of Brazil's placement in 2013 to become the highest placing South American gymnast in a men's all-around final in history.

== Competitive history ==
Competitive history of Ángel Barajas at the junior level
Year	Event	Team	AA	FX	PH	SR	VT	PB	HB
2018	Colombian Championships		1st place, gold medalist(s)						
2019	Colombian Championships (senior)		6		4				
2021
2021	Pan American Championships	2nd place, silver medalist(s)	3rd place, bronze medalist(s)	3rd place, bronze medalist(s)	1st place, gold medalist(s)				3rd place, bronze medalist(s)
2021	South American Championships	3rd place, bronze medalist(s)	3rd place, bronze medalist(s)						
2022	South American Youth Games	1st place, gold medalist(s)	1st place, gold medalist(s)	1st place, gold medalist(s)	1st place, gold medalist(s)	4	1st place, gold medalist(s)	1st place, gold medalist(s)	1st place, gold medalist(s)
2022	Pan American Championships	4	2nd place, silver medalist(s)	2nd place, silver medalist(s)			2nd place, silver medalist(s)	3rd place, bronze medalist(s)	1st place, gold medalist(s)
2023
2023	Junior World Championships		2nd place, silver medalist(s)	1st place, gold medalist(s)				1st place, gold medalist(s)	3rd place, bronze medalist(s)

Competitive history of Ángel Barajas at the senior level
Year	Event	Team	AA	FX	PH	SR	VT	PB	HB
2024	Cairo World Cup							8	3rd place, bronze medalist(s)
2024	Cottbus World Cup							4	
2024	Baku World Cup							3rd place, bronze medalist(s)	3rd place, bronze medalist(s)
2024	Doha World Cup								4
2024	Olympic Games							14	2nd place, silver medalist(s)
2025
2025	Pan American Championships	5	7			7		7	5
2025	Paris World Challenge Cup							2nd place, silver medalist(s)	5
2025	Szombathely World Challenge Cup			6				7	2nd place, silver medalist(s)
2025	World Championships	—N/a	6					4	R1
2026	Cottbus World Cup								2nd place, silver medalist(s)
2026	Baku World Cup							1st place, gold medalist(s)	3rd place, bronze medalist(s)
2026	Antalya World Cup							2nd place, silver medalist(s)	2nd place, silver medalist(s)
2026	Osijek World Cup							1st place, gold medalist(s)	3rd place, bronze medalist(s)
2026	Pan American Championships	2nd place, silver medalist(s)	2nd place, silver medalist(s)	2nd place, silver medalist(s)	3rd place, bronze medalist(s)	8		6	1st place, gold medalist(s)
2026	Central American and Caribbean Games	1st place, gold medalist(s)	1st place, gold medalist(s)			2nd place, silver medalist(s)		1st place, gold medalist(s)	1st place, gold medalist(s)
2026	South American Games	2nd place, silver medalist(s)	4		1st place, gold medalist(s)	2nd place, silver medalist(s)		1st place, gold medalist(s)	1st place, gold medalist(s)
2026	World Championships	8	5						7
