= Colombia men's national artistic gymnastics team =

Colombia men's national gymnastics team
- Continental union: PAGU
- National federation: Federación Colombiana de Gimnasia

Olympic Games
- Appearances: 0

World Championships

Gymnastics at the Pan American Games
- Medals: Bronze: 2015

Pan American Championships
- Medals: Silver: 2014, 2018, 2024, 2026; Bronze: 1997, 2021

The Colombia men's national artistic gymnastics team represents Colombia in World Gymnastics international competitions.

== History ==
Colombia has never fielded a full team to the Olympic Games. Jorge Hugo Giraldo became the first Colombian Olympic gymnast in 2004. He went on to compete at the 2008 and 2012 Olympic Games as well. At the 2016 Olympic Games, Jossimar Calvo became the first Colombian to qualify for an Olympic final, finishing tenth in the all-around final. At the 2024 Olympic Games, Ángel Barajas became the first Colombian to win an Olympic medal in gymnastics, winning silver on horizontal bar.

At the 2026 World Championships, Colombia qualified to their first ever team final where they ultimately finished 8th.

== Team competition results ==
=== World Championships ===
| Year | Position | Squad |
|---|---|---|
| 2003 | 44th place | James Brochero, Edison Carvajal, Deivy Castellanos, Jorge Hugo Giraldo, Giovanni Quintero, Francisco Rodríguez, Edison Vernaza |
| 2010 | 20th place | James Brochero, Jossimar Calvo, Deivy Castellanos, Jorge Hugo Giraldo, Didier Lugo, Jorge Peña |
| 2011 | 23rd place | James Brochero, Jossimar Calvo, Jorge Hugo Giraldo, Fabian Meza, Jorge Peña, Javier Sandoval |
| 2014 | 17th place | Carlos Calvo, Jossimar Calvo, Jorge Hugo Giraldo, Jhonny Muñoz, Carlos Orozco, Javier Sandoval |
| 2015 | 18th place | Kristopher Bohórquez, Carlos Calvo, Jossimar Calvo, Jorge Hugo Giraldo, Andres Martínez, Jhonny Muñoz |
| 2018 | 31st place | Carlos Calvo, Jossimar Calvo, Didier Lugo, Andres Martínez, Erick Vargas |
| 2022 | 23rd place | Jossimar Calvo, Manuel Martínez, Andres Martínez, Javier Sandoval |
| 2023 | 23rd place | Dilan Jiménez, Juan Larrahondo, Manuel Martínez, Andres Martínez, Sergio Vargas |
| 2026 | 8th place | Jorman Álvarez, Ángel Barajas, Thomas Mejía, Camilo Vera, Yan Zabala, Juan Felipe Ramos |

=== Pan American Games ===
| Year | Position | Squad |
|---|---|---|
| 1983 | 7th place | |
| 2007 | 6th place | James Brochero, Jorge Hugo Giraldo, Didier Lugo, Fabian Meza |
| 2011 | 4th place | James Brochero, Jossimar Calvo, Jorge Hugo Giraldo, Fabian Meza, Jorge Peña, Javier Sandoval |
| 2015 | Bronze medal | Carlos Calvo, Jossimar Calvo, Jorge Hugo Giraldo, Didier Lugo, Jhonny Muñoz |
| 2019 | 5th place | Jossimar Calvo, Didier Lugo, Andres Martínez, Manuel Martínez, José Toro |
| 2023 | 7th place | Kristopher Bohórquez, Dilan Jiménez, Juan Larrahondo, Andres Martínez, Sergio Vargas |

== Most decorated gymnasts ==
This list includes all Colombian male artistic gymnasts who have won a medal at the Olympic Games or the World Artistic Gymnastics Championships.

| Rank | Gymnast | Team | AA | FX | PH | SR | VT | PB | HB | Olympic Total | World Total | Total |
|---|---|---|---|---|---|---|---|---|---|---|---|---|
| 1 | Ángel Barajas | | | | | | | | 2024 | 1 | 0 | 1 |

== Best international results ==
| Event | TF | AA | FX | PH | SR | VT | PB | HB |
|---|---|---|---|---|---|---|---|---|
| Olympic Games | | 10 | | | | | | 2nd place, silver medalist(s) |
| World Championships | 8 | 5 | | | | | 4 | 5 |
| Junior World Championships | 12 | 2nd place, silver medalist(s) | 1st place, gold medalist(s) | | | | 1st place, gold medalist(s) | 1st place, gold medalist(s) |
| Pan American Games | 3rd place, bronze medalist(s) | 1st place, gold medalist(s) | 3rd place, bronze medalist(s) | 1st place, gold medalist(s) | 4 | 6 | 1st place, gold medalist(s) | 1st place, gold medalist(s) |
| Pan American Championships | 2nd place, silver medalist(s) | 1st place, gold medalist(s) | 2nd place, silver medalist(s) | 2nd place, silver medalist(s) | 2nd place, silver medalist(s) | 1st place, gold medalist(s) | 1st place, gold medalist(s) | 1st place, gold medalist(s) |
| Junior Pan American Games | 2nd place, silver medalist(s) | 1st place, gold medalist(s) | 3rd place, bronze medalist(s) | 4 | 4 | 1st place, gold medalist(s) | 1st place, gold medalist(s) | 1st place, gold medalist(s) |
| South American Games | 1st place, gold medalist(s) | 1st place, gold medalist(s) | 1st place, gold medalist(s) | 1st place, gold medalist(s) | 1st place, gold medalist(s) | 5 | 1st place, gold medalist(s) | 1st place, gold medalist(s) |
| Central American and Caribbean Games | 1st place, gold medalist(s) | 1st place, gold medalist(s) | 2nd place, silver medalist(s) | 1st place, gold medalist(s) | 1st place, gold medalist(s) | 2nd place, silver medalist(s) | 1st place, gold medalist(s) | 1st place, gold medalist(s) |

== See also ==
- Colombia women's national artistic gymnastics team
