= Victoria Mata (gymnast) =

Mexican artistic gymnast (born 2000)

- Full name: Victoria Fernanda Mata Montemayor
- Nickname: Kiki
- Born: October 16, 2000 (age 26) Monterrey, Nuevo León, Mexico

Gymnastics career
- Country represented: Mexico
- Club: Regio Gymnastics
- Head coach: Antonio Barazza
Medal record
Representing Mexico
Women's artistic gymnastics
Pan American Championships
Silver medal – second place	2021 Rio de Janeiro	Team
Central American and Caribbean Games
Gold medal – first place	2026 Santo Domingo	Team
Gold medal – first place	2026 Santo Domingo	Uneven bars
Silver medal – second place	2026 Santo Domingo	All-around
Silver medal – second place	2026 Santo Domingo	Vault
Bronze medal – third place	2018 Barranquilla	Team
FIG World Cup
Event	1st	2nd	3rd
World Challenge Cup	0	0	1
Total	0	0	1

Victoria Fernanda Mata Montemayor (born October 16, 2000) is a Mexican artistic gymnast. She was part of the silver medal-winning team at the 2021 Pan American Championships. Additionally, she was the 2026 Central American and Caribbean Games gold medalist on uneven bars. Mata is a four-time competitor at the World Championships, qualifying for the World vault final in 2026.

== Gymnastics career ==
=== 2016-2017 ===
Mata became eligible for senior competition in 2016. That year, she was the Mexican National Vault Champion, in addition to placing fifth in the all-around at the Mexican Championships. She made her international senior debut at the 2017 World Championships, where she placed 44th in the all-around, as well as 18th on vault.

=== 2018 ===
In 2018, Mata won silver medals on vault and floor exercise at the Mexican Championships. She next competed at the Guimaraes World Challenge Cup, winning the bronze medal on vault, her first international medal. She also placed sixth in the floor final.

Mata was part of the bronze medal-winning Mexican team at the 2018 Central American and Caribbean Games. Individually, she finished sixth on vault and fourth on floor exercise. Later than year, Mata competed at her second World Championships. The Mexican team placed 19th.

=== 2019-2021 ===
At the 2019 Mexican Championships, Mata placed third in the all-around. She did not compete again until the 2021 Pan American Championships. Mexico won the silver medal as a team, behind Brazil and ahead of Argentina. Mata had the ninth-highest all-around score, as well as the eighth-highest uneven bars and floor exercise score, during the qualification round, but she did not advance to any finals due to the two-per-country rule.

=== 2022-Present ===
From 2022 to 2024, Mata competed only domestically, winning the bronze medal on uneven bars at the 2024 National Championships. In 2025, she represented Mexico at the World Championships, placing 14th on vault during qualifications.

In 2026, Mata once again became the Mexican National Vault Champion, ten years after she first won the title in 2016. She was named to the team for the 2026 Pan American Championships, where she contributed to Mexico's fifth-place finish. This placement qualified Mexico to send a full team to the World Championships later in the year. Mata qualified for the all-around and vault finals, placing ninth and fourth, respectively.

Mata represented Mexico at the 2026 Central American and Caribbean Games in Santo Domingo, Dominican Republic. Mexico won the team title ahead of Panama and the Dominican Republic. Individually, Mata won gold on uneven bars as well as silver on vault and in the all-around.

In October of 2026, Mata was named to the Mexican team for the World Championships in Rotterdam, alongside teammates Paulina Guerra, Mariangela Flores, Jazmyn Jiménez, and Michelle Pineda. They finished 15th as a team. Additionally, Mata qualified for the vault final, her first appearance in any final at the World Championship level. She ultimately placed sixth.

== Competitive history ==
Competitive history of Victoria Mata
Year	Event	Team	AA	VT	UB	BB	FX
2016	Mexican Championships		5	1st place, gold medalist(s)			
2016	Olimpiada Nacional		2nd place, silver medalist(s)	2nd place, silver medalist(s)	3rd place, bronze medalist(s)		
2016	Mexican Open		5		3rd place, bronze medalist(s)		
2017	Mexican Championships		8				
2017	World Championships	—N/a	44	18	63	77	63
2017	Mexican Open		6				
2018	Mexican Championships		7	2nd place, silver medalist(s)			2nd place, silver medalist(s)
2018	Guimaraes World Challenge Cup			3rd place, bronze medalist(s)			6
2018	Central American and Caribbean Games	3rd place, bronze medalist(s)					
2018	World Championships	19					108
2019	Mexican Championships		3rd place, bronze medalist(s)				
2021
2021	Pan American Championships	2nd place, silver medalist(s)					
2023	Mexican Championships		13				
2024	Mexican Championships		9		3rd place, bronze medalist(s)		
2025	Mexican Championships		7				
2025	World Championships	—N/a		14	104		50
2026
2026	Mexican Championships		8	1st place, gold medalist(s)	3rd place, bronze medalist(s)		
2026	Central American and Caribbean Games	1st place, gold medalist(s)	2nd place, silver medalist(s)	2nd place, silver medalist(s)	1st place, gold medalist(s)		8
2026	World Championships	15		6			
