= Yan Zabala =

Colombian gymnast

- Full name: Yan Dairon Zabala Arévalo
- Born: 11 March 2006 (age 20) Cúcuta, Colombia

Gymnastics career
- Discipline: Men's artistic gymnastics
- Country represented: Colombia; (2018–present)
- Club: Liga Norte de Santander
- Head coach: Jairo Ruiz
Medal record
Representing Colombia
Men's artistic gymnastics
Pan American Championships
| Silver medal – second place | 2026 Rio de Janeiro | Team |
Central American and Caribbean Games
| Gold medal – first place | 2026 Santo Domingo | Team |
| Silver medal – second place | 2026 Santo Domingo | Parallel bars |
| Silver medal – second place | 2026 Santo Domingo | Horizontal bar |
South American Games
| Silver medal – second place | 2026 Santa Fe | Team |
South American Championships
| Silver medal – second place | 2025 Medellín | Horizontal bar |
Bolivarian Games
| Gold medal – first place | 2025 Lima-Ayacucho | Team |
| Gold medal – first place | 2025 Lima-Ayacucho | Parallel bars |
| Gold medal – first place | 2025 Lima-Ayacucho | Horizontal bar |
| Bronze medal – third place | 2025 Lima-Ayacucho | All-around |

Yan Dairon Zabala Arévalo (born March 11, 2006) is a Colombian artistic gymnast. He was part of the silver medal-winning team at the 2026 Pan American Championships. He is a three-time Bolivarian Games champion.

== Gymnastics career ==
Zabala competed at the 2025 South American Championships where he won silver on horizontal bar. He next competed at the 2025 Bolivarian Games where he helped Colombia win team gold. Individually he won bronze in the all-around and gold on parallel bars and horizontal bar.

At the 2026 Pan American Championships, Zabala helped Colombia win the silver medal behind Canada. Individually, he finished fifth in the horizontal bar final. Zabala next competed at the 2026 Central American and Caribbean Games where he helped Colombia win team gold. Individually he won silver on parallel bars and horizontal bar, behind teammate Ángel Barajas on both.

At the 2026 World Championships, Zabala helped Colombia qualify for their first team final in history where they ultimately finished eighth.

== Competitive history ==
Competitive history of Yan Zabala at the junior level
| Year | Event | Team | AA | FX | PH | SR | VT | PB | HB |
|---|---|---|---|---|---|---|---|---|---|
| 2018 | Colombian Championships (junior) | | 6 | | | | | | |
| 2019 | Colombian Championships (youth) | | 1st place, gold medalist(s) | 2nd place, silver medalist(s) | 1st place, gold medalist(s) | 1st place, gold medalist(s) | 3rd place, bronze medalist(s) | 2nd place, silver medalist(s) | 4 |
| 2022 | South American Youth Games | 1st place, gold medalist(s) | 8 | | | | | 3rd place, bronze medalist(s) | |
| 2022 | South American Junior Championships | | 7 | 5 | | 7 | | 1st place, gold medalist(s) | 5 |
| 2023 | Colombian Championships | | 3rd place, bronze medalist(s) | | | | | | |
| 2023 | South American Junior Championships | 1st place, gold medalist(s) | 4 | | | | | 1st place, gold medalist(s) | |
| 2024 | Bolivarian Youth Games | | | | 1st place, gold medalist(s) | | | | |
| 2024 | Pacific Rim Championships | 3rd place, bronze medalist(s) | | | 2nd place, silver medalist(s) | | | | |
| 2024 | Colombian Championships | | 2nd place, silver medalist(s) | | | | | | |
| 2024 | Pan American Championships | 2nd place, silver medalist(s) | 4 | | 2nd place, silver medalist(s) | | | 1st place, gold medalist(s) | |

Competitive history of Yan Zabala at the senior level
| Year | Event | Team | AA | FX | PH | SR | VT | PB | HB |
|---|---|---|---|---|---|---|---|---|---|
| 2025 | Colombian Championships | | 2nd place, silver medalist(s) | 2nd place, silver medalist(s) | 1st place, gold medalist(s) | 2nd place, silver medalist(s) | 3rd place, bronze medalist(s) | 2nd place, silver medalist(s) | 1st place, gold medalist(s) |
| 2025 | Pan American Championships | 5 | 9 | | 6 | | | | 7 |
| 2025 | Paris World Challenge Cup | | | | | | | 8 | |
| 2025 | Szombathely World Challenge Cup | | | | | | | | 7 |
| 2025 | World Championships | | | | | | | 16 | 39 |
| 2025 | South American Championships | 4 | 4 | | | | | | 2nd place, silver medalist(s) |
| 2025 | Bolivarian Games | 1st place, gold medalist(s) | 3rd place, bronze medalist(s) | 6 | | 6 | | 1st place, gold medalist(s) | 1st place, gold medalist(s) |
| 2026 | Cottbus World Cup | | | | | | | | R1 |
| 2026 | Baku World Cup | | | | | | | | R1 |
| 2026 | Antalya World Cup | | | | | | | | R1 |
| 2026 | Colombian Championships | | 2nd place, silver medalist(s) | 1st place, gold medalist(s) | 1st place, gold medalist(s) | | | 2nd place, silver medalist(s) | 1st place, gold medalist(s) |
| 2026 | Pan American Championships | 2nd place, silver medalist(s) | | | | | | | 5 |
| 2026 | Central American and Caribbean Games | 1st place, gold medalist(s) | | | 6 | | | 2nd place, silver medalist(s) | 2nd place, silver medalist(s) |
| 2026 | South American Games | 2nd place, silver medalist(s) | 8 | | | | | | |
| 2026 | World Championships | 8 | | | | | | | |
