= Maria Daniella Gonzalez =

Guatemalan rhythmic gymnast

- Full name: Maria Daniella Gonzalez Maldonado
- Born: 8 September 2007 (age 19) Guatemala

Gymnastics career
- Discipline: Rhythmic gymnastics
- Country represented: Guatemala; (2021–present)
- Head coach: Cecilia Juárez
Medal record
Women's artistic gymnastics
Representing Guatemala
Central American and Caribbean Games
Silver medal – second place	2026 Santo Domingo	Hoop
Silver medal – second place	2026 Santo Domingo	Ribbon

Maria Daniella Gonzalez Maldonado (born 8 September 2007) is a Guatemalan rhythmic gymnast. She represents Guatemala in international competitions.

== Personal life ==
Gonzalez went in for rhythmic gymnastics at the age of seven, encouraged by her father, who's a professional football player in Guatemala. She has two brothers and a sisters, the boys play football while her sister is also a rhythmic gymnast.

== Career ==
=== Junior ===
In 2021 Gonzalez competed at the first Junior Pan American Games, being 8th with ball, 7th with 5 balls and 6th in teams. In July 2022 she won all five silver medals at the Interclub tournament in Mexico. Later in the same year she took 8th place at the Pan American Championships in Rio de Janeiro.

=== Senior ===
She became age eligible for senior competition in 2023, becoming the Guatemalan national champion. She repeated the result in 2024, also taking part in the Pan American Championships where she was 14th in the All-Around and 11th in teams. At the 2024 Pacific Rim Championships she was 12th overall, 7th with hoop, 11th with ball, 13th with clubs and 11th with ribbon.

In 2025 she participated in the World Challenge Cup in Portimão, being 41st in the All-Around, 41st with hoop, 45th with ball, 36th with clubs and 34th with ribbon. At the Pan American Championships she took 9th place overall and 11th in teams (along Luiza Velazquez and Camila Diaz). In August she made her World Championships debut, being 90th in the All-Around, 88th with hoop, 86th with ball, 82nd with clubs and 93rd with ribbon. In October she won gold with clubs at the Central American Games.

At the 2026 World Cup in Sofia she was 71st in the All-Around, 70th with hoop, 69th with ball, 67th with clubs and 68th with ribbon. The following month she took 68th place in Baku. At the European Cup she was 43rd overall, 40th with hoop, 43rd with ball, 41st with clubs and 46th with ribbon. In June she competed at the Pan American Championships, being 12th overall. In July she was selected for the Central American and Caribbean Games in Santo Domingo, where she won silver with hoop and with ribbon.
