= Alyiah Lide de León =

Panamanian artistic gymnast (born 2009)

- Full name: Alyiah Danais Lide De León
- Nickname: Aly
- Born: July 24, 2009 (age 17)

Gymnastics career
- Country represented: Panama
- Club: No Limits Gymnastics
Medal record
Representing Panama
Women's artistic gymnastics
South American Games
Bronze medal – third place	2026 Santa Fe	Team
Central American and Caribbean Games
Gold medal – first place	2026 Santo Domingo	Balance beam
Gold medal – first place	2026 Santo Domingo	Floor exercise
Silver medal – second place	2026 Santo Domingo	Team
Central American Games
Gold medal – first place	2025 Guatemala City	Balance beam
Gold medal – first place	2025 Guatemala City	Floor exercise
Silver medal – second place	2025 Guatemala City	Team
Silver medal – second place	2025 Guatemala City	Vault
Bronze medal – third place	2025 Guatemala City	All-around
Bronze medal – third place	2025 Guatemala City	Uneven bars
Bolivarian Games
Gold medal – first place	2025 Lima-Ayacucho	Team
Gold medal – first place	2025 Lima-Ayacucho	All-around
Silver medal – second place	2025 Lima-Ayacucho	Floor exercise

Alyiah Danais Lide de León (born July 24, 2009) is a Panamanian artistic gymnast. She is the 2026 Central American and Caribbean Games champion on balance beam and floor exercise. She was also the 2025 Bolivarian Games all-around champion. Lide represented Panama at the 2026 World Championships.

== Junior career ==
Lide competed for Panama at the 2023 Junior World Championships, where her best results were 45th in the all-around and 20th on balance beam.

At the beginning of 2024, Lide won four gold medals at the inaugural Bolivarian Youth Games, including all-around gold. Additionally, at the 2024 Junior Pan American Championships, Lide finished eighth in the all-around and qualified for the balance beam final, where she also finished eighth.

Lide participated in the Junior South American Championships in 2022, 2023, and 2024, winning several medals, including gold on vault in 2024. She also won five individual gold medals at the 2024 Junior Pacific Rim Championships.

== Senior career ==
=== 2025 ===
Lide made her senior debut at the 2025 Varna World Challenge Cup, competing on balance beam and floor exercise. She qualified for the floor final and finished in fourth place. She also competed at the Paris World Challenge Cup later in 2025, though she did not advance to any finals.

At the 2025 Pan American Championships, she contributed to Panama's fifth-place finish as a team, in addition to placing fifth on balance beam and seventh on floor exercise.

Lide won a medal on every event at the 2025 Central American Games, including gold on balance beam and floor exercise. At the Bolivarian Games in November, she won the team gold medal for Panama with teammates Karla Navas, Hillary Heron, Tatiana Tapia, and Ana Gabriela Gutiérrez. Individually, she won all-around gold as well as silver on floor.

=== 2026 ===
Lide began the 2026 season at the Osijek World Cup. She competed on uneven bars, balance beam, and floor exercise. Her twelfth place finish on floor allowed her to secure a spot at the 2026 World Championships in Rotterdam as an apparatus specialist.

The Panamanian team finished sixth at the 2026 Pan American Championships, and although Lide finished 21st in all-around qualifications, she was not eligible for the all-around final due to the two-per-country rule. She also did not advance to any event finals.

Lide competed at the 2026 Central American and Caribbean Games, where she contributed to Panama's silver-medal finish as a team. Individually, she won the gold medal on both balance beam and floor exercise. The following month, Lide competed at the South American Games, where she won another team medal, a bronze, for Panama.

== Competitive history ==
Competitive history of Alyiah Lide de León at the junior level
Year	Event	Team	AA	VT	UB	BB	FX
2022	Junior South American Championships	4	9	3rd place, bronze medalist(s)			
2023
2023	Junior World Championships	19	45	27	97	20	45
2023	Junior South American Championships	3rd place, bronze medalist(s)	9	6	4	8	
2024	Bolivarian Youth Games	1st place, gold medalist(s)	1st place, gold medalist(s)	1st place, gold medalist(s)		1st place, gold medalist(s)	1st place, gold medalist(s)
2024	Junior Pacific Rim Championships		1st place, gold medalist(s)	1st place, gold medalist(s)	1st place, gold medalist(s)	1st place, gold medalist(s)	1st place, gold medalist(s)
2024	Junior Pan American Championships	5	8			8	
2024	Junior South American Championships	3rd place, bronze medalist(s)		1st place, gold medalist(s)	2nd place, silver medalist(s)		3rd place, bronze medalist(s)

Competitive history of Alyiah Lide de León at the senior level
Year	Event	Team	AA	VT	UB	BB	FX
2025	Varna World Challenge Cup						4
2025	Pan American Championships	5				5	7
2025	Paris World Challenge Cup						
2025	Central American Games	2nd place, silver medalist(s)	3rd place, bronze medalist(s)	2nd place, silver medalist(s)	3rd place, bronze medalist(s)	1st place, gold medalist(s)	1st place, gold medalist(s)
2025	Bolivarian Games	1st place, gold medalist(s)	1st place, gold medalist(s)		4		2nd place, silver medalist(s)
2026	Osijek World Cup						
2026	Pan American Championships	6					
2026	Central American and Caribbean Games	2nd place, silver medalist(s)	4	6		1st place, gold medalist(s)	1st place, gold medalist(s)
2026	South American Games	3rd place, bronze medalist(s)					
2026	World Championships						122
