= Julieta Lucas =

Argentine artistic gymnast (born 2010)

- Nickname: Juli
- Born: July 15, 2010 (age 16) Buenos Aires, Argentina

Gymnastics career
- Country represented: Argentina
- Club: Olímpica Pilar
- Head coach: Guillermo Echeveste
Medal record
Representing Argentina
Women's artistic gymnastics
South American Games
Gold medal – first place	2026 Santa Fe	Team
Gold medal – first place	2026 Santa Fe	All-around
Gold medal – first place	2026 Santa Fe	Uneven bars
Gold medal – first place	2026 Santa Fe	Floor exercise
Silver medal – second place	2026 Santa Fe	Balance beam
Junior Pan American Games
Silver medal – second place	2025 Asunción	All-around
Silver medal – second place	2025 Asunción	Uneven bars

Julieta Lucas (born July 15, 2010) is an Argentine artistic gymnast. She is the 2026 South American Games All-Around Champion. She was also the all-around silver medalist at the 2025 Junior Pan American Games, and she represented Argentina at the 2025 Junior World Championships.

== Junior career ==
=== 2024 ===
Lucas first competed internationally at the 2024 Pan American Championships, where she won the bronze medal with the Argentine team, in addition to placing fifth in the all-around. She also qualified for the uneven bars final, finishing fourth.

At the 2024 South American Junior Championships, Lucas won gold medals in the all-around and team events.

=== 2025 ===
Lucas competed at the 2025 Junior Pan American Games, winning the silver medal in the all-around behind Charleigh Bullock of the United States and ahead of Addalye VanGrinsven of the United States. She won a second silver medal on uneven bars, in addition to finishing fifth on floor exercise, eighth on balance beam, and fourth with the Argentine team.

In November, Lucas won her second-straight all-around title at the 2025 South American Championships. She also won gold medals on uneven bars and floor exercise, as well as team gold for Argentina.

At the 2025 Junior World Championships, Lucas competed on all four events and finished 40th in the all-around, as well as 23rd on balance beam.

== Senior career ==
=== 2026 ===
Lucas made her international senior debut at the 2026 Pan American Championships. Her fourth-place finish with the Argentine team allowed the country to send a full team to the 2026 World Championships in Rotterdam. She also qualified for the all-around final, where she placed eighth, and the uneven bars final, where she placed seventh.

In September, she won the national all-around title at the Argentine National Championships. Based on this result, she was named to the team for the South American Games. With teammates Emilia Acosta, Isabella Ajalla, Delfina Estoco, and Rocío Saucedo, Argentina won the gold medal in the team competition, the nation's first since 1994. Individually, Lucas also won the gold medal in the all-around. During event finals, she won gold on uneven bars and floor exercise, as well as silver on balance beam.

== Competitive history ==
Competitive history of Julieta Lucas at the junior level
Year	Event	Team	AA	VT	UB	BB	FX
2024
2024	Junior Pan American Championships	3rd place, bronze medalist(s)	5		4		
2024	South American Junior Championships	1st place, gold medalist(s)	1st place, gold medalist(s)				
2025
2025	Argentinian Championships		1st place, gold medalist(s)	1st place, gold medalist(s)	1st place, gold medalist(s)	2nd place, silver medalist(s)	1st place, gold medalist(s)
2025	Junior Pan American Games	4	2nd place, silver medalist(s)	6	2nd place, silver medalist(s)	8	5
2025	South American Junior Championships	1st place, gold medalist(s)	1st place, gold medalist(s)	2nd place, silver medalist(s)	1st place, gold medalist(s)		1st place, gold medalist(s)
2025	Junior World Championships		40	28	33	23	88

Competitive history of Julieta Lucas at the senior level
Year	Event	Team	AA	VT	UB	BB	FX
2026
2026	Pan American Championships	4	8		7		
2026	Argentinian Championships		1st place, gold medalist(s)				
2026	South American Games	1st place, gold medalist(s)	1st place, gold medalist(s)		1st place, gold medalist(s)	2nd place, silver medalist(s)	1st place, gold medalist(s)
2026	World Championships						
