= Gymnastics at the 2026 South American Games =

Gymnastics competitions at the 2026 South American Games

- Venue: Invencible Arena
- Location: Rosario, Argentina
- Dates: September 13–21

Gymnastics competitions at the 2026 South American Games in Rosario, Argentina was held between September 13 and 21, 2026 at the Invencible Arena.

== Schedule ==
The competition schedule is as follows:

P	Preliminary	F	Final

Artistic gymnastics
Date Event	Sun 13	Mon 14	Tue 15	Wed 16
Men's team all-around	F			
Men's individual all-around	F			
Men's floor exercise	P		F	
Men's pommel horse	P		F	
Men's rings	P		F	
Men's vault	P			F
Men's parallel bars	P			F
Men's Horizontal bar	P			F
Women's team all-around		F		
Women's individual all-around		F		
Women's vault		P	F	
Women's uneven bars		P	F	
Women's balance beam		P		F
Women's floor exercise		P		F

Rhythmic gymnastics
Date Event	Fri 18	Sat 19	Sun 20	Mon 21
Individual all-around	P	P	F	
Ball	P			F
Clubs		P		F
Hoop	P			F
Ribbon		P		F
Group all-around	P	F		
5 hoops	P		F	
3 ribbons + 2 balls		P		F

Trampoline gymnastics
Date Event	Sat 19	Sun 20	Mon 21
Men's individual		P	F
Men's synchronized	P		F
Women's individual		P	F
Women's synchronized	P		F
Mixed synchronized	P		F

== Medal summary ==
=== Medal table ===
* Host nation (Argentina)

Rank	Nation	Gold	Silver	Bronze	Total
1	Brazil (BRA)	11	12	2	25
2	Colombia (COL)	5	3	2	10
3	Argentina (ARG)*	5	2	10	17
4	Chile (CHI)	1	0	4	5
5	Venezuela (VEN)	0	3	1	4
6	Panama (PAN)	0	1	2	3
7	Peru (PER)	0	1	0	1
8	Ecuador (ECU)	0	0	1	1
Totals (8 entries)		22	22	22	66

=== Medalists ===
==== Men's artistic gymnastics ====
Event	Gold	Silver	Bronze
Team all-around	Brazil; Bernardo Actos; Vitaliy Guimarães; Yuri Guimarães; Johnny Oshiro; Patrick Sampaio; Diogo Soares	Colombia; Jorman Álvarez; Ángel Barajas; Thomas Mejía; Juan Ramos; Daniel Villa; Yan Zabala	Argentina; Luca Alfieri; Ivo Chiapponi; Matías Coralizzi; Santiago Mayol; Nahuel Pardo; Daniel Villafañe
Individual all-around	Thomas Mejía; Colombia	Diogo Soares; Brazil	Patrick Sampaio; Brazil
Floor exercise	Thomas Mejía; Colombia	Bernardo Actos; Brazil	Pablo Figueroa; Chile
Pommel horse	Ángel Barajas; Colombia	Thomas Mejía; Colombia	Adickxon Trejo; Venezuela
Rings	Joaquín Álvarez; Chile	Ángel Barajas; Colombia	Daniel Villafañe; Argentina
Vault	Yuri Guimarães; Brazil	Daniel Agüero; Peru	Josué Armijo; Chile
Parallel bars	Ángel Barajas; Colombia	Diogo Soares; Brazil	Ivo Chiapponi; Argentina
Horizontal bar	Ángel Barajas; Colombia	Diogo Soares; Brazil	Luciano Letelier; Chile

==== Women's artistic gymnastics ====
Event	Gold	Silver	Bronze
Team all-around	Argentina; Emilia Acosta; Isabella Ajalla; Fila Dalinger; Delfina Estoco; Julieta Lucas; Rocío Saucedo	Brazil; Gabriela Barbosa; Gabriela Bouças; Julia Coutinho; Thaís Fidélis; Carolyne Pedro; Rebeca Procópio	Panama; Ana Lucía Beitia; Ana Gabriela Gutiérrez; Hillary Heron; Alyiah Lide de León; Tatiana Tapia
Individual all-around	Julieta Lucas; Argentina	Gabriela Bouças; Brazil	Emilia Acosta; Argentina
Vault	Emilia Acosta; Argentina	Hillary Heron; Panama	Ashley Bohórquez; Ecuador
Uneven bars	Julieta Lucas; Argentina	Delfina Estoco; Argentina	Julia Coutinho; Brazil
Balance beam	Gabriela Bouças; Brazil	Julieta Lucas; Argentina	Fila Dalinger; Argentina
Floor exercise	Julieta Lucas; Argentina	Julia Coutinho; Brazil	Ana Gabriela Gutiérrez; Panama

==== Rhythmic gymnastics ====
Event	Gold	Silver	Bronze
Individual all-around	Maria Eduarda Alexandre; Brazil	Geovanna Santos; Brazil	Celeste D'Arcángelo; Argentina
Hoop	Maria Eduarda Alexandre; Brazil	Geovanna Santos; Brazil	Agostina Vargas Re; Argentina
Ball	Barbara Domingos; Brazil	Maria Eduarda Alexandre; Brazil	Celeste D'Arcángelo; Argentina
Clubs	Geovanna Santos; Brazil	Maria Eduarda Alexandre; Brazil	Celeste D'Arcángelo; Argentina
Ribbon	Maria Eduarda Alexandre; Brazil	Barbara Domingos; Brazil	Celeste D'Arcángelo; Argentina
Group all-around	Brazil; Maria Eduarda Arakaki; Renata Diniz; Mariana Vitória Gonçalves; Julia Kurunczi; Sofia Pereira; Nicole Pircio	Venezuela; Camila Campos; Mariana Dona; Maria Escobar; Kaily Ramírez; Gabriela Rodriguez; Samanta Rojas	Colombia; Natalia Jimenez; Adriana Mantilla; Maria Mendoza; Ashlee Patiño; Kizzy Rivas
5 balls	Brazil; Maria Eduarda Arakaki; Renata Diniz; Mariana Vitória Gonçalves; Julia Kurunczi; Sofia Pereira; Nicole Pircio	Venezuela; Camila Campos; Mariana Dona; Maria Escobar; Kaily Ramírez; Gabriela Rodriguez; Samanta Rojas	Colombia; Natalia Jimenez; Adriana Mantilla; Maria Mendoza; Ashlee Patiño; Kizzy Rivas
3 hoops + 4 clubs	Brazil; Maria Eduarda Arakaki; Renata Diniz; Mariana Vitória Gonçalves; Julia Kurunczi; Sofia Pereira; Nicole Pircio	Venezuela; Camila Campos; Mariana Dona; Maria Escobar; Kaily Ramírez; Gabriela Rodriguez; Samanta Rojas	Chile; Antonia Gallegos; Martina Inostroza; Annalena Ley; Isabel Lozano; Josefina Romero

==== Trampoline gymnastics ====
Event	Gold	Silver	Bronze
Men's individual	Santiago Parra; Colombia	Diego Giraldo; Colombia	Vinicius Celestino; Brazil
Men's synchronized	Colombia; Diego Giraldo; Santiago Parra	Argentina; Santiago Ferrari; Tobías Weise	Venezuela; Carlos Betancourt; Jezreel Gonzalez
Women's individual	Camilla Lopes; Brazil	Valentina Podesta; Argentina	Alida Rojo; Venezuela
Women's synchronized	Brazil; Alice Gomes; Camilla Lopes	Venezuela; Parvati Alberti; Alida Rojo	Bolivia; Mia Flores; Maya Quinteros
Mixed synchronized	Brazil; Camilla Lopes; Vinicius Celestino	Argentina; Lucila Maldonado; Tobías Weise	Venezuela; Alida Rojo; Jezreel Gonzalez

== Men's artistic results ==
=== Men's artistic team all-around ===
Rank	Team	Floor (gymnastics)	Pommel horse	Rings (gymnastics)	Vault (gymnastics)	Parallel bars	Horizontal bar	Total
1st place, gold medalist(s)	Brazil	49.200 (2)	53.250 (1)	51.250 (3)	54.100 (1)	48.700 (3)	54.000 (1)	310.500
1st place, gold medalist(s)	Diogo Soares	12.200	13.600	12.600	13.550	12.800	13.850	310.500
1st place, gold medalist(s)	Patrick Sampaio	12.200	13.100	12.850	13.300	13.000	13.600	310.500
1st place, gold medalist(s)	Vitaliy Guimarães	12.000	13.050	12.750	13.600	11.300	12.450	310.500
1st place, gold medalist(s)	Bernardo Actos	12.800	11.750		12.900	11.600	13.500	310.500
1st place, gold medalist(s)	Yuri Guimarães	11.950		12.250	13.650	10.950	13.050	310.500
1st place, gold medalist(s)	Johnny Oshiro		13.500	13.050				310.500
2nd place, silver medalist(s)	Colombia	47.650 (4)	48.750 (4)	51.600 (2)	54.050 (2)	53.800 (1)	49.750 (3)	305.600
2nd place, silver medalist(s)	Thomas Mejía	12.500	13.300	12.800	13.250	13.800	13.100	305.600
2nd place, silver medalist(s)	Ángel Barajas	11.050	12.900	13.400	14.050	13.250	13.250	305.600
2nd place, silver medalist(s)	Yan Zabala	12.300	11.050	12.350	13.400	13.850	11.400	305.600
2nd place, silver medalist(s)	Daniel Villa			12.100	13.050	11.950	12.000	305.600
2nd place, silver medalist(s)	Juan Ramos	11.800	11.300		13.350		11.400	305.600
2nd place, silver medalist(s)	Jorman Álvarez	9.350	11.250	13.050		12.900		305.600
3rd place, bronze medalist(s)	Argentina	49.250 (1)	50.400 (2)	51.650 (1)	52.500 (3)	49.900 (2)	50.700 (2)	304.400
3rd place, bronze medalist(s)	Ivo Chiapponi	13.000	11.000	DNS	12.900	12.550	12.300	304.400
3rd place, bronze medalist(s)	Santiago Mayol	12.150	13.300	12.700	13.250	12.050	12.250	304.400
3rd place, bronze medalist(s)	Matías Coralizzi	11.350	13.150	12.850	11.850	12.550	11.700	304.400
3rd place, bronze medalist(s)	Nahuel Pardo	12.100	10.650	12.300	12.700	12.300	12.850	304.400
3rd place, bronze medalist(s)	Daniel Villafañe	12.000		13.800	13.650			304.400
3rd place, bronze medalist(s)	Luca Alfieri		12.950			12.500	13.300	304.400
4	Chile	46.400 (5)	48.950 (3)	49.950 (4)	51.750 (4)	48.200 (5)	47.450 (4)	292.700
4	Luciano Letelier	12.250	12.300	12.000	13.200	11.200	13.600	292.700
4	Pablo Figueroa	12.350	12.000	12.000	13.300	11.900	11.350	292.700
4	Josué Armijo	10.700	11.300	11.100	12.950	12.050	11.100	292.700
4	Ignacio Varas	11.100	10.700	12.100	12.300	10.650		292.700
4	Joaquín Álvarez			13.850	12.250	13.050	10.800	292.700
4	Nicolás Toro	10.600	13.350				11.400	292.700
5	Peru	48.200 (3)	45.200 (5)	45.950 (5)	50.900 (5)	48.600 (4)	47.050 (5)	285.900
5	Daniel Agüero	12.800	DNS	DNS	13.550	11.800	DNS	285.900
5	Arian Leon	10.700	10.500	11.500	DNS	11.600	11.300	285.900
5	Jesús Moreto	12.300	12.850	11.650	12.650	12.200	11.200	285.900
5	Eduardo Manrique	12.300	11.350	11.200	11.900	12.400	12.600	285.900
5	Edward Alarcon	10.800	10.500	11.600	12.800	12.200	11.950	285.900

=== Men's artistic individual all-around ===
The all-around results were determined based on the qualification round, with no designated all-around final. Below are the results of the gymnasts who performed on all six events in qualification, ranking only two athletes per country.

Rank	Gymnast	Floor (gymnastics)	Pommel horse	Rings (gymnastics)	Vault (gymnastics)	Parallel bars	Horizontal bar	Total
1st place, gold medalist(s)	(Colombia) Thomas Mejía	12.500	13.300	12.800	13.250	13.800	13.100	78.750
2nd place, silver medalist(s)	(Brazil) Diogo Soares	12.200	13.600	12.600	13.550	12.800	13.850	78.600
3rd place, bronze medalist(s)	(Brazil) Patrick Sampaio	12.200	13.100	12.850	13.300	13.000	13.600	78.050
4	(Colombia) Ángel Barajas	11.050	12.900	13.400	14.050	13.250	13.250	77.900
5	(Argentina) Santiago Mayol	12.150	13.300	12.700	13.250	12.050	12.250	75.700
6	(Chile) Luciano Letelier	12.250	12.300	12.000	13.200	11.200	13.600	74.550
7	(Argentina) Matías Coralizzi	11.350	13.150	12.850	11.850	12.550	11.700	73.450
8	(Venezuela) Adickxon Trejo	12.650	12.900	11.800	13.100	11.850	11.000	73.300
9	(Chile) Pablo Figueroa	12.350	12.000	12.000	13.300	11.900	11.350	72.900
10	(Peru) Jesús Moreto	12.300	12.850	11.650	12.650	12.200	11.200	72.850
11	(Peru) Eduardo Manrique	12.300	11.350	11.200	11.900	12.400	12.600	71.750
12	(Ecuador) Daniel Chica	12.600	10.950	11.000	12.600	11.850	11.800	70.800
13	(Uruguay) Victor Rostagno	13.100	10.000	12.200	12.650	10.000	12.200	70.150
14	(Ecuador) Cesar López	11.900	10.200	12.650	13.200	10.350	11.450	69.750
15	(Panama) Richard Atencio	11.600	11.600	10.500	12.200	11.000	9.700	66.600
16	(Bolivia) Leonardo Mamani	9.350	9.700	9.850	12.400	10.700	9.950	61.950

=== Men's floor exercise ===
Rank	Gymnast	D Score	E Score	Pen.	Bon.	Total
1st place, gold medalist(s)	(Colombia) Thomas Mejía	5.3	8.125			13.425
2nd place, silver medalist(s)	(Brazil) Bernardo Actos	5.1	8.050			13.150
3rd place, bronze medalist(s)	(Chile) Pablo Figueroa	5.1	7.925	−0.1		12.925
4	(Peru) Daniel Agüero	4.8	8.200	−0.1		12.900
5	(Uruguay) Victor Rostagno	4.9	7.975			12.875
6	(Venezuela) Adickxon Trejo	4.7	7.975			12.675
7	(Argentina) Ivo Chiapponi	4.5	7.200			11.700
8	(Ecuador) Daniel Chica	4.9	6.575			11.475

=== Men's pommel horse ===
Rank	Gymnast	D Score	E Score	Pen.	Bon.	Total
1st place, gold medalist(s)	(Colombia) Ángel Barajas	5.8	8.050			13.850
2nd place, silver medalist(s)	(Colombia) Thomas Mejía	4.9	8.225			13.125
3rd place, bronze medalist(s)	(Venezuela) Adickxon Trejo	4.5	7.925			12.425
4	(Chile) Nicolás Toro	4.9	6.950			11.850
5	(Argentina) Santiago Mayol	4.7	7.125			11.825
6	(Brazil) Johnny Oshiro	4.7	6.750			11.450
7	(Argentina) Matías Coralizzi	3.8	7.300			11.100
8	(Brazil) Diogo Soares	3.8	5.400			9.200

=== Men's rings ===
Rank	Gymnast	D Score	E Score	Pen.	Bon.	Total
1st place, gold medalist(s)	(Chile) Joaquín Álvarez	5.1	8.375			13.475
2nd place, silver medalist(s)	(Colombia) Ángel Barajas	5.2	8.025			13.225
3rd place, bronze medalist(s)	(Argentina) Daniel Villafañe	5.0	8.100			13.100
4	(Brazil) Johnny Oshiro	4.5	8.225			12.725
5	(Brazil) Patrick Sampaio	4.5	8.150			12.650
6	(Ecuador) Stefano Romero	4.2	8.400			12.600
7	(Colombia) Jorman Álvarez	5.2	7.400			12.500
8	(Argentina) Matías Coralizzi	3.8	8.525			12.325

=== Men's vault ===
Rank	Gymnast	Vault 1					Vault 2					Total
Rank	Gymnast	D Score	E Score	Pen.	Bon.	Score 1	D Score	E Score	Pen.	Bon.	Score 2	Total
1st place, gold medalist(s)	(Brazil) Yuri Guimarães	4.8	8.850			13.650	4.8	8.700			13.500	13.575
2nd place, silver medalist(s)	(Peru) Daniel Agüero	4.8	8.875			13.675	4.4	9.000			13.400	13.537
3rd place, bronze medalist(s)	(Chile) Josué Armijo	4.4	9.175			13.575	4.8	8.800	−0.1		13.500	13.537
4	(Ecuador) Daniel Chica	4.8	8.575			13.375	4.4	8.950			13.350	13.363
5	(Ecuador) Stefano Romero	4.8	7.575			12.375	4.8	9.150		0.1	14.050	13.213
6	(Argentina) Daniel Villafañe	4.8	8.300	−0.1		13.000	4.8	8.625	−0.1		13.325	13.162
7	(Chile) Ignacio Varas	4.4	9.050			13.450	4.8	7.775			12.575	13.012
8	(Uruguay) Victor Rostagno	7.8	7.575		−0.3	12.075	0.0	0.000			0.000	6.037

=== Men's parallel bars ===
Rank	Gymnast	D Score	E Score	Pen.	Bon.	Total
1st place, gold medalist(s)	(Colombia) Ángel Barajas	6.2	7.825			14.025
2nd place, silver medalist(s)	(Brazil) Diogo Soares	5.2	8.400			13.600
3rd place, bronze medalist(s)	(Argentina) Ivo Chiapponi	4.5	8.450			12.950
4	(Colombia) Thomas Mejía	5.2	7.750			12.950
5	(Brazil) Patrick Sampaio	5.1	7.575			12.675
6	(Chile) Joaquín Álvarez	4.4	8.150			12.550
7	(Argentina) Matías Coralizzi	3.6	8.825			12.425
8	(Peru) Eduardo Manrique	4.2	6.875			11.075

=== Men's horizontal bar ===
Rank	Gymnast	D Score	E Score	Pen.	Bon.	Total
1st place, gold medalist(s)	(Colombia) Ángel Barajas	6.0	8.350		0.1	14.450
2nd place, silver medalist(s)	(Brazil) Diogo Soares	5.3	8.325			13.600
3rd place, bronze medalist(s)	(Chile) Luciano Letelier	5.2	7.000			12.200
4	(Colombia) Thomas Mejía	5.0	7.100			12.100
5	(Brazil) Patrick Sampaio	4.7	7.150			11.850
6	(Argentina) Luca Alfieri	4.1	7.500			11.600
7	(Peru) Eduardo Manrique	4.1	6.975			11.075
8	(Argentina) Nahuel Pardo	4.0	6.855			10.850

== Women's artistic results ==
=== Women's artistic team all-around ===
Rank	Team	Vault (gymnastics)	Uneven bars	Balance beam	Floor (gymnastics)	Total
1st place, gold medalist(s)	Argentina	53.901 (1)	50.702 (1)	52.202 (2)	51.901 (1)	208.706
1st place, gold medalist(s)	Julieta Lucas	13.367	13.034	13.034	13.000	208.706
1st place, gold medalist(s)	Emilia Acosta	13.367	12.334	12.800	13.000	208.706
1st place, gold medalist(s)	Rocío Saucedo	13.134	12.534	12.434	12.767	208.706
1st place, gold medalist(s)	Fila Dalinger	13.567	12.300	13.934		208.706
1st place, gold medalist(s)	Isabella Ajalla	13.600		11.300	13.134	208.706
1st place, gold medalist(s)	Delfina Estoco		12.800		12.700	208.706
2nd place, silver medalist(s)	Brazil	52.268 (3)	49.818 (2)	52.335 (1)	51.767 (2)	206.188
2nd place, silver medalist(s)	Gabriela Bouças	13.334	12.350	13.467	13.200	206.188
2nd place, silver medalist(s)	Carolyne Pedro	12.900	12.467	12.900	12.700	206.188
2nd place, silver medalist(s)	Gabriela Barbosa	12.700	12.000	13.234	12.700	206.188
2nd place, silver medalist(s)	Julia Coutinho	13.100	12.634		13.167	206.188
2nd place, silver medalist(s)	Rebeca Procópio	12.934		10.367	11.200	206.188
2nd place, silver medalist(s)	Thaís Fidélis		12.367	12.734		206.188
3rd place, bronze medalist(s)	Panama	52.568 (2)	46.134 (3)	49.735 (3)	50.101 (3)	198.538
3rd place, bronze medalist(s)	Hillary Heron	13.634	11.534	13.134	12.967	198.538
3rd place, bronze medalist(s)	Ana Gabriela Gutiérrez	12.967	12.000	12.700	12.500	198.538
3rd place, bronze medalist(s)	Alyiah Lide de León	13.067	10.900	12.334	12.834	198.538
3rd place, bronze medalist(s)	Ana Lucía Beitia	12.900	11.700	11.534	11.800	198.538
3rd place, bronze medalist(s)	Tatiana Tapia	12.734	10.367	11.567	10.934	198.538
4	Peru	46.969 (4)	44.069 (4)	46.201 (4)	46.468 (4)	183.707
4	Ana Méndez	12.434	11.434	11.067	11.400	183.707
4	Yannick Worring	12.334	10.034	11.967	11.967	183.707
4	Chloé Rodrigues	11.634	11.634	9.634	9.567	183.707
4	Danica Rems	10.567	8.700	10.100	11.567	183.707
4	Fabiola Díaz		10.967	13.067	11.534	183.707
5	Bolivia	43.901 (5)	24.268 (5)	37.301 (5)	37.834 (5)	143.304
5	Zafira Montalvan	11.500	8.534	10.067	10.000	143.304
5	Sara Castellón	10.167	9.567	9.500	10.334	143.304
5	Sofia Soliz	11.334	6.167	7.000	7.500	143.304
5	Salme Ortiz	10.900	0.000	10.734	10.000	143.304

=== Women's artistic individual all-around ===
The all-around results were determined based on the qualification round, with no designated all-around final. Below are the results of the gymnasts who performed on all four events in qualification, ranking only two athletes per country.

Rank	Gymnast	Vault (gymnastics)	Uneven bars	Balance beam	Floor (gymnastics)	Total
1st place, gold medalist(s)	(Argentina) Julieta Lucas	13.367	13.034	13.034	13.000	52.435
2nd place, silver medalist(s)	(Brazil) Gabriela Bouças	13.334	12.350	13.467	13.200	52.351
3rd place, bronze medalist(s)	(Argentina) Emilia Acosta	13.367	12.334	12.800	13.000	51.501
4	(Panama) Hillary Heron	13.634	11.534	13.134	12.967	51.269
5	(Brazil) Carolyne Pedro	12.900	12.467	12.900	12.700	50.967
6	(Panama) Ana Gabriela Gutiérrez	12.967	12.000	12.700	12.500	50.167
7	(Ecuador) Ashley Bohórquez	13.534	12.067	10.667	12.067	48.335
8	(Peru) Ana Méndez	12.434	11.434	11.067	11.400	46.335
9	(Peru) Yannick Worring	12.334	10.034	11.967	11.967	46.302
10	(Aruba) Casey Provence	11.734	10.934	10.134	11.667	44.469
11	(Venezuela) Oriana Fernández	12.700	9.534	11.134	11.000	44.368
12	(Chile) Martina Flores	11.934	8.534	10.034	11.167	41.669
13	(Chile) Sofía Casella	10.067	7.867	11.967	10.767	40.668
14	(Bolivia) Zafira Montalvan	11.500	8.534	10.067	10.000	40.101
15	(Bolivia) Sara Castellón	10.167	9.567	9.500	10.334	39.568
16	(Uruguay) Paulina Paz	11.867	6.534	10.567	10.167	39.135

=== Women's vault ===
Rank	Gymnast	Vault 1				Vault 2				Bonus	Total
Rank	Gymnast	D Score	E Score	Pen.	Score 1	D Score	E Score	Pen.	Score 2	Bonus	Total
1st place, gold medalist(s)	(Argentina) Emilia Acosta	4.6	9.200		13.800	4.2	8.900		13.100	0.2	13.650
2nd place, silver medalist(s)	(Panama) Hillary Heron	4.6	8.967		13.567	4.0	8.800		12.800	0.2	13.384
3rd place, bronze medalist(s)	(Ecuador) Ashley Bohórquez	4.6	8.967		13.567	4.4	8.634		13.034		13.300
4	(Chile) Makarena Pinto	4.4	8.567		12.967	3.8	8.667		12.467	0.2	12.917
5	(Panama) Ana Lucía Beitia	4.4	8.534		12.934	4.2	8.500		12.700		12.817
6	(Venezuela) Oriana Fernández	4.2	8.334		12.534	3.4	8.367		11.767		12.151
7	(Chile) Martina Flores	3.4	8.434		11.834	3.2	8.500		11.700		11.767
8	(Aruba) Casey Provence	3.2	8.367	−0.1	11.467	3.4	8.234		11.634		11.550

=== Women's uneven bars ===
Rank	Gymnast	D Score	E Score	Pen.	Total
1st place, gold medalist(s)	(Argentina) Julieta Lucas	5.8	7.600		13.400
2nd place, silver medalist(s)	(Argentina) Delfina Estoco	5.1	7.567		12.667
3rd place, bronze medalist(s)	(Brazil) Julia Coutinho	5.4	7.234		12.634
4	(Brazil) Carolyne Pedro	5.0	7.567		12.567
5	(Panama) Ana Lucía Beitia	4.3	7.367		11.667
6	(Ecuador) Ashley Bohórquez	4.9	6.334		11.234
7	(Panama) Ana Gabriela Gutiérrez	5.1	6.134		11.234
8	(Peru) Chloé Rodrigues	4.5	6.300		10.800

=== Women's balance beam ===
Rank	Gymnast	D Score	E Score	Pen.	Total
1st place, gold medalist(s)	(Brazil) Gabriela Bouças	5.2	8.067		13.267
2nd place, silver medalist(s)	(Argentina) Julieta Lucas	5.5	7.700		13.200
3rd place, bronze medalist(s)	(Argentina) Fila Dalinger	5.4	7.434		12.834
4	(Brazil) Gabriela Barbosa	5.3	7.500		12.800
5	(Panama) Ana Gabriela Gutiérrez	4.5	7.900		12.400
6	(Peru) Fabiola Díaz	5.0	7.400		12.400
7	(Panama) Hillary Heron	5.1	7.134		12.234
8	(Peru) Yannick Worring	4.5	6.467	−0.1	10.867

=== Women's floor exercise ===
Rank	Gymnast	D Score	E Score	Pen.	Total
1st place, gold medalist(s)	(Argentina) Julieta Lucas	5.3	7.934		13.234
2nd place, silver medalist(s)	(Brazil) Julia Coutinho	5.4	7.867	−0.1	13.167
3rd place, bronze medalist(s)	(Panama) Ana Gabriela Gutiérrez	5.3	7.734	−0.1	12.934
4	(Brazil) Gabriela Bouças	5.0	7.900	−0.1	12.800
5	(Panama) Hillary Heron	5.0	7.634		12.634
6	(Argentina) Isabella Ajalla	5.4	7.300	−0.3	12.400
7	(Ecuador) Ashley Bohórquez	4.8	7.200	−0.3	11.700
8	(Peru) Yannick Worring	4.2	6.834		11.034

== Rhythmic results ==
=== Women's rhythmic individual all-around ===
Rank	Gymnast	Nation	Hoop (rhythmic gymnastics)	Ball (rhythmic gymnastics)	Ribbon (rhythmic gymnastics)	Clubs (rhythmic gymnastics)	Total				
Rank	Gymnast	Nation	1st place, gold medalist(s)	Maria Eduarda Alexandre	Brazil	29.500	Total	28.550	27.600	28.900	114.550
2nd place, silver medalist(s)	Geovanna Santos	Brazil	29.050	24.400	28.400	28.300	110.150				
3rd place, bronze medalist(s)	Celeste D'Arcángelo	Argentina	26.850	24.100	26.650	25.750	103.350				
4	Jimena Dominguez	Venezuela	25.750	24.400	26.400	24.250	100.800				
5	Oriana Viñas	Colombia	23.700	24.700	24.550	24.450	97.400				
6	Agostina Vargas Re	Argentina	25.200	24.450	23.700	23.650	97.000				
7	Mayte Guzman	Bolivia	23.100	22.700	23.700	22.450	91.950				
8	Camila Arismendi	Venezuela	23.200	22.800	22.400	20.850	89.250				
9	Josefa Cornejo	Chile	23.050	17.000	23.050	21.200	84.300				
10	Ana Carolina De Conto	Paraguay	22.550	19.450	20.800	21.250	84.050				

=== Women's rhythmic individual ball ===
Rank	Gymnast	Nation	D Score	E Score	Pen.	Total
Rank	Gymnast	Nation	1st place, gold medalist(s)			
2nd place, silver medalist(s)						
3rd place, bronze medalist(s)						
4						
5						
6						
7						
8						

=== Women's rhythmic individual clubs ===
Rank	Gymnast	Nation	D Score	E Score	Pen.	Total
Rank	Gymnast	Nation	1st place, gold medalist(s)			
2nd place, silver medalist(s)						
3rd place, bronze medalist(s)						
4						
5						
6						
7						
8						

=== Women's rhythmic individual ribbon ===
Rank	Gymnast	Nation	D Score	E Score	Pen.	Total
Rank	Gymnast	Nation	1st place, gold medalist(s)			
2nd place, silver medalist(s)						
3rd place, bronze medalist(s)						
4						
5						
6						
7						
8						

=== Women's rhythmic group all-around ===
Position	Gymnast	Nation	5 Balls	3 Hoops & 4 Clubs	Total
1st place, gold medalist(s)					
2nd place, silver medalist(s)					
3rd place, bronze medalist(s)					
4					
5					
6					

=== Women's rhythmic group 5 balls ===
Rank	Gymnasts	Nation	Qualification					Final					
Rank	Gymnasts	Nation	Art.	AD Score	E Score	Pen.	Total	Art.	AD Score	BD Score	E Score	Pen.	Total
1st place, gold medalist(s)													
2nd place, silver medalist(s)													
3rd place, bronze medalist(s)													
4													
5													
6													

=== Women's rhythmic group 3 hoops + 4 clubs ===
Rank	Gymnasts	Nation	Qualification					Final					
Rank	Gymnasts	Nation	Art.	AD Score	E Score	Pen.	Total	Art.	AD Score	BD Score	E Score	Pen.	Total
1st place, gold medalist(s)													
2nd place, silver medalist(s)													
3rd place, bronze medalist(s)													
4													
5													
6													

== Trampoline results ==
=== Men's individual trampoline ===
Rank	Gymnasts	Nation	Qualification						Final				
Rank	Gymnasts	Nation	Diff.	Horizon	Exce.	Pen.	Time of F.	Total	Diff.	Horizon	Exce.	Time of F.	Total
1st place, gold medalist(s)													
2nd place, silver medalist(s)													
3rd place, bronze medalist(s)													
4													
5													
6													
7													
8													

=== Women's individual trampoline ===
Rank	Gymnasts	Nation	Qualification						Final				
Rank	Gymnasts	Nation	Diff.	Horizon	Exce.	Pen.	Time of F.	Total	Diff.	Horizon	Exce.	Time of F.	Total
1st place, gold medalist(s)													
2nd place, silver medalist(s)													
3rd place, bronze medalist(s)													
4													
5													
6													
7													
8													

== See also ==
- 2026 South American Artistic Gymnastics Championships
- 2026 South American Rhythmic Gymnastics Championships
- 2026 South American Trampoline Championships
