= Sophia Weisberg =

Brazilian artistic gymnast

- Born: 11 December 2009 (age 16) Araras, São Paulo

Gymnastics career
- Discipline: Women's artistic gymnastics
- Country represented: Brazil; (2024–present)
- Club: Esporte Clube Pinheiros (ECP)
- Head coach: Beatriz Fragoso
Medal record
Artistic gymnastics
Representing Brazil
Pan American Championships
Silver medal – second place	2026 Rio de Janeiro	Team
Bronze medal – third place	2026 Rio de Janeiro	Uneven bars
Junior Pan American Championships
Silver medal – second place	2024 Santa Marta	Vault

Sophia Weisberg (born 11 December 2009) is a Brazilian artistic gymnast and a member of the Brazilian national gymnastics team. She is the 2025 Brazilian National Champion.

== Career ==
2024

In April, she participated in the City of Jesolo Trophy, where she helped Brazil's junior team finish fourth. She advanced to vault and floor finals, placing fifth and fourth, respectively. After this competition, she got her first major medal in an international competition, when she got a silver on vault behind Lia Monica Fontaine at the Pan American Championships.

2025

Weisberg drew herself a great deal of attention during her first year as a senior by advancing to all finals at the Brazilian Championships. She grabbed the national all-around and vault titles, which resulted in her nomination for the World Championships in Jakarta, Indonesia. She competed alongside Flávia Saraiva, Julia Soares and Júlia Coutinho.

2026 At the Pan American Championships in Rio de Janeiro, Weisberg won silver in the team competition alongside Rebeca Andrade, Gabriela Bouças, Thaís Fidelis, Julia Soares and Gabriela Barbosa. She qualified for the all-around, uneven bars and floor finals, placing fourth in the all-around with 51.365 points and winning bronze on the uneven bars.

In October, Weisberg made her World Championships debut in Rotterdam as the youngest member of the Brazilian team, alongside Rebeca Andrade, Flávia Saraiva, Lorrane Oliveira and Thaís Fidelis. She did not qualify for any individual final. Brazil advanced to the team final in eighth place and finished fifth with 159.730 points, and Weisberg contributed a score of 14.033 in the final.

== Competitive history ==
Competitive history of Sophia Weisberg at the junior level
Year	Event	Team	AA	VT	UB	BB	FX
2022	Brazilian Championships		21	6	35	19	14
2022	Brazilian Junior Championships		5	4			1st place, gold medalist(s)
2023	Brazilian Junior Championships	3rd place, bronze medalist(s)	4	3rd place, bronze medalist(s)			3rd place, bronze medalist(s)
2024	City of Jesolo Trophy	4		6			4
2024	Junior Pan American Championships	4		2nd place, silver medalist(s)			8
2024	Brazil Trophy	—N/a	—N/a	8			4
2024	Brazilian Championships	3rd place, bronze medalist(s)	8	3rd place, bronze medalist(s)	5	8	
2024	Brazilian Junior Championships	2nd place, silver medalist(s)	3rd place, bronze medalist(s)	2nd place, silver medalist(s)	2nd place, silver medalist(s)	3rd place, bronze medalist(s)	2nd place, silver medalist(s)
2024	Gymnasiade	2nd place, silver medalist(s)	6	4	2nd place, silver medalist(s)		
2024	South American Junior Championships	2nd place, silver medalist(s)		4			8

Competitive history of Sophia Weisberg at the senior level
Year	Event	Team	AA	VT	UB	BB	FX
2025	City of Jesolo Trophy	7					
2025	Brazil Trophy	—N/a	—N/a				2nd place, silver medalist(s)
2025	Brazilian Championships	2nd place, silver medalist(s)	1st place, gold medalist(s)	1st place, gold medalist(s)	5	6	4
2025	World Championships	—N/a		26	35	21	
2026	Brazil Trophy	—N/a	—N/a		2nd place, silver medalist(s)		
2026	Pan American Championships	2nd place, silver medalist(s)	4		3rd place, bronze medalist(s)		8
2026	World Championships	5		109	149		45
