= Diogo Soares (gymnast) =

Brazilian artistic gymnast

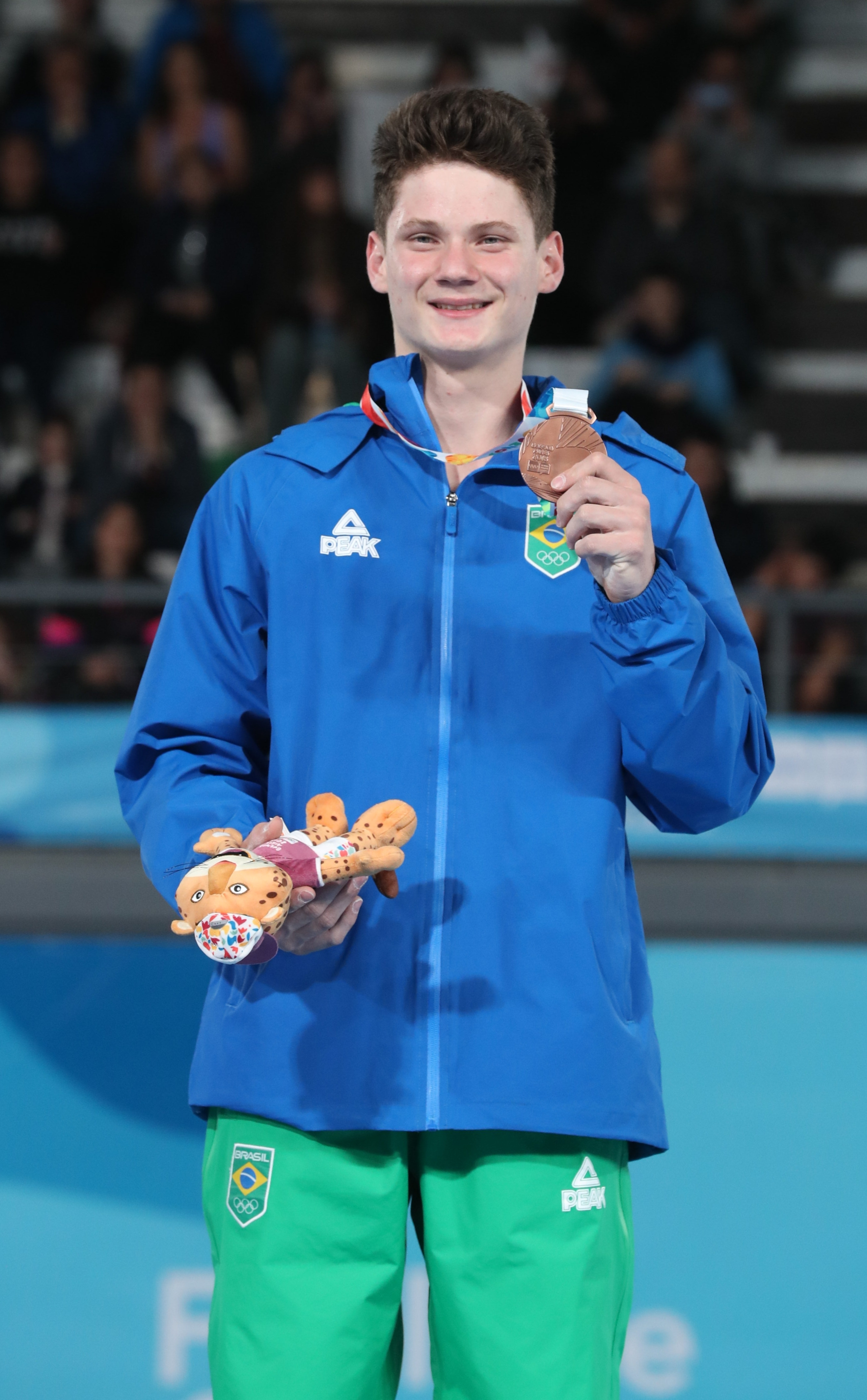
- Soares at the 2018 Youth Olympic Games

Personal information
- Full name: Diogo Brajão Soares
- Born: 12 April 2002 (age 24) Piracicaba, Brazil
- Height: 1.62 m (5 ft 4 in)

Gymnastics career
- Discipline: Men's artistic gymnastics
- Country represented: Brazil; (2016–present)
- Club: Flamengo
- Head coach: Daniel Biscalchin
Medal record
Representing Brazil
Men's artistic gymnastics
Pan American Games
Silver medal – second place	2023 Santiago	All-around
Bronze medal – third place	2023 Santiago	Team
Pan American Championships
Gold medal – first place	2021 Rio de Janeiro	Team
Gold medal – first place	2024 Santa Marta	Team
Gold medal – first place	2024 Santa Marta	Pommel horse
Gold medal – first place	2024 Santa Marta	Horizontal bar
Silver medal – second place	2022 Rio de Janeiro	Team
Silver medal – second place	2024 Santa Marta	Parallel bars
Silver medal – second place	2025 Panama City	Parallel bars
Silver medal – second place	2026 Rio de Janeiro	Parallel bars
Silver medal – second place	2026 Rio de Janeiro	Horizontal bar
Bronze medal – third place	2021 Rio de Janeiro	All-around
Bronze medal – third place	2021 Rio de Janeiro	Parallel bars
Bronze medal – third place	2025 Panama City	All-around
South American Games
Gold medal – first place	2022 Asunción	Team
Gold medal – first place	2026 Santa Fe	Team
Silver medal – second place	2026 Santa Fe	All-around
Silver medal – second place	2026 Santa Fe	Parallel bars
Silver medal – second place	2026 Santa Fe	Horizontal bar
Bronze medal – third place	2022 Asunción	Horizontal bar
Youth Olympic Games
Silver medal – second place	2018 Buenos Aires	Horizontal bar
Bronze medal – third place	2018 Buenos Aires	All-around
Junior World Championships
Silver medal – second place	2019 Győr	Rings
FIG World Cup
Event	1st	2nd	3rd
World Challenge Cup	0	1	0
Total	0	1	0

Diogo Brajão Soares (born 12 April 2002) is a Brazilian artistic gymnast and a member of the national team. He participated in the 2018 Youth Olympic Games and the 2019 Junior World Artistic Gymnastics Championships. He represented Brazil at the 2020 and 2024 Olympic Games.

== Early life ==
Diogo Soares started gymnastics at the age of 4. His sister, Driele, is a former gymnast.

== Gymnastics career ==
=== Junior ===
Soares' first major international competition was the 2016 Pan American Championships, where he won a silver medal with the Brazilian team. In 2018, Soares competed at the 2018 Youth Olympic Games, earning a bronze medal in the all-around and a silver medal in the horizontal bar. At the 2019 Junior World Championships he earned a silver medal on rings.

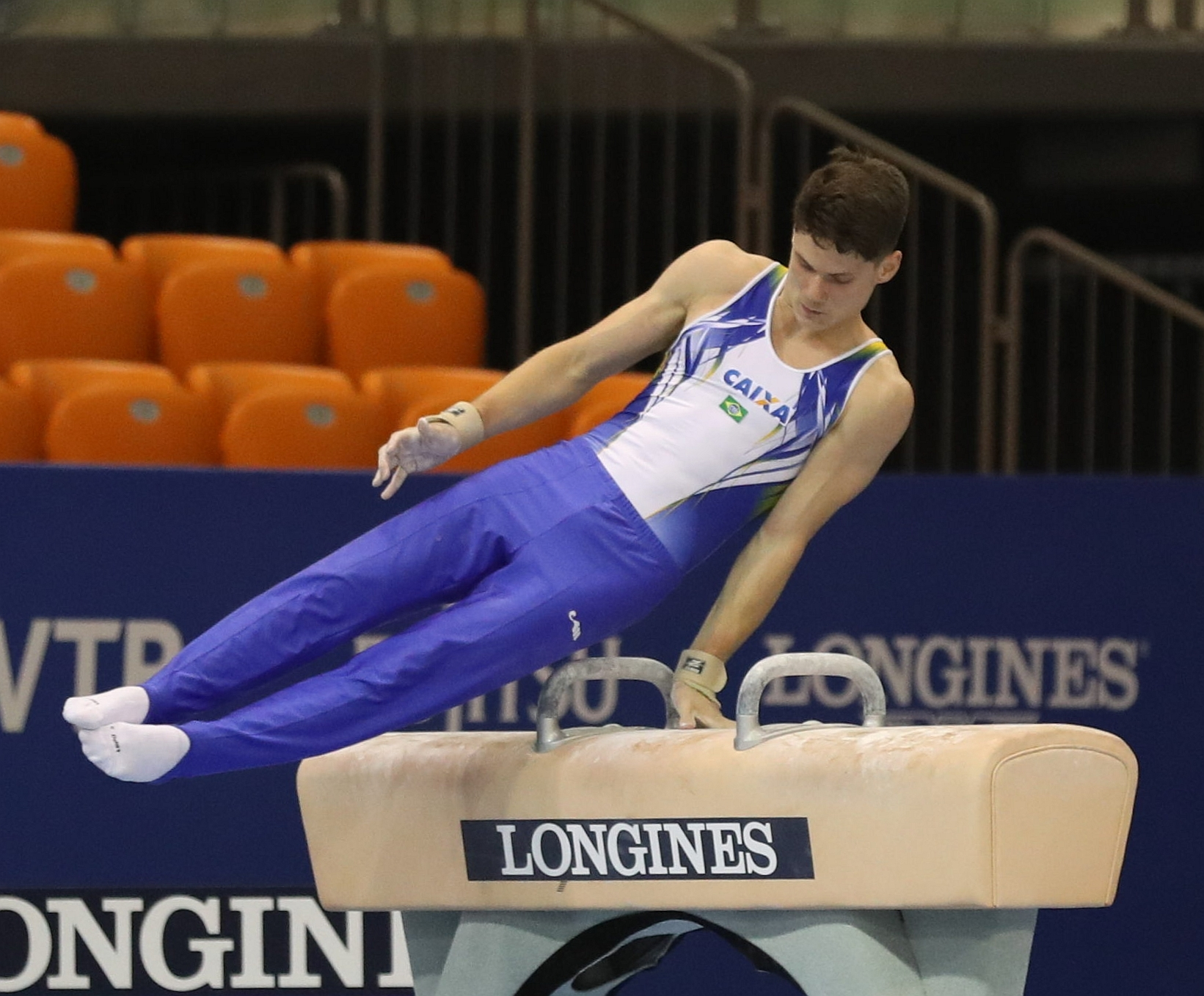
Pommel horse

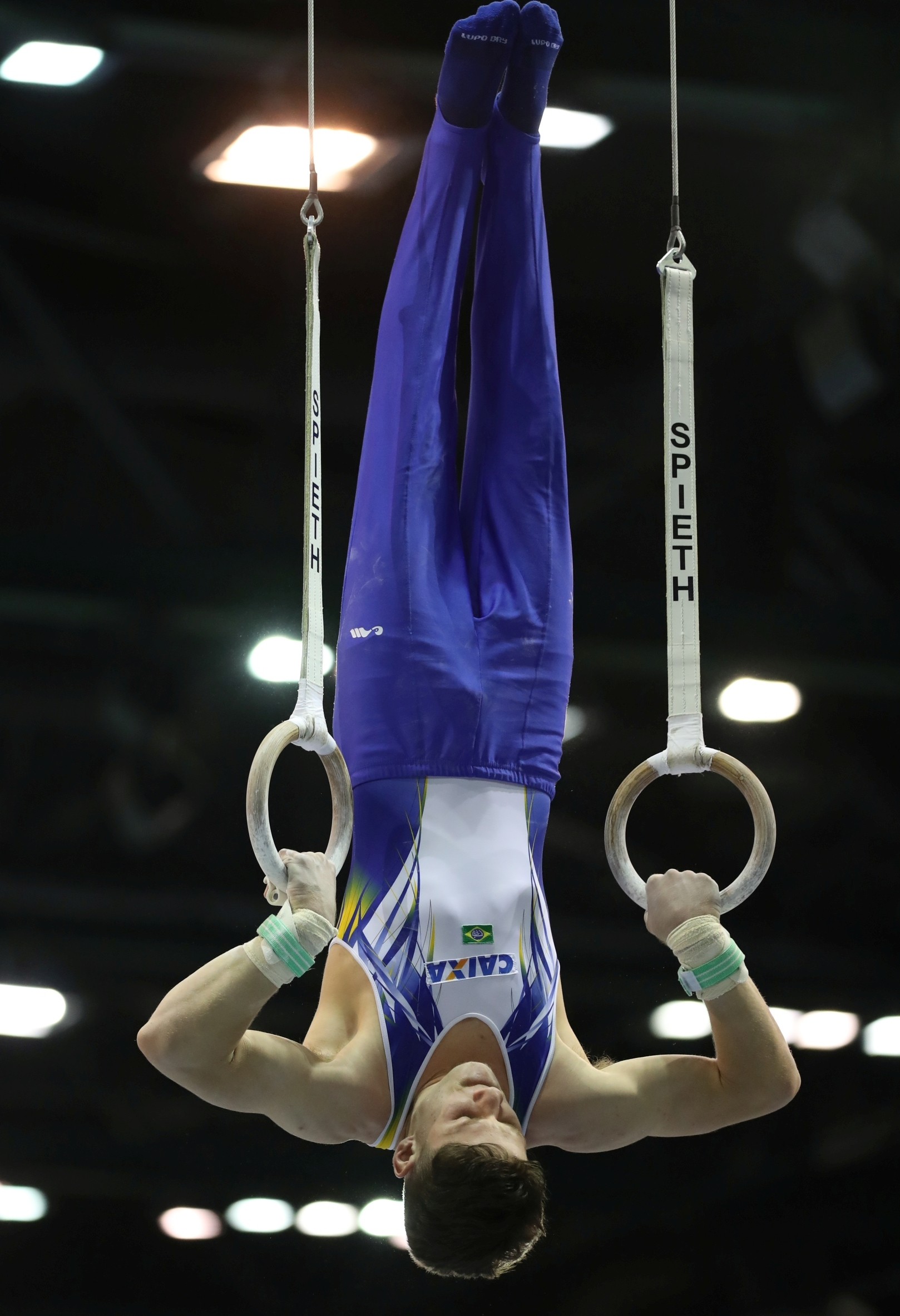
Rings

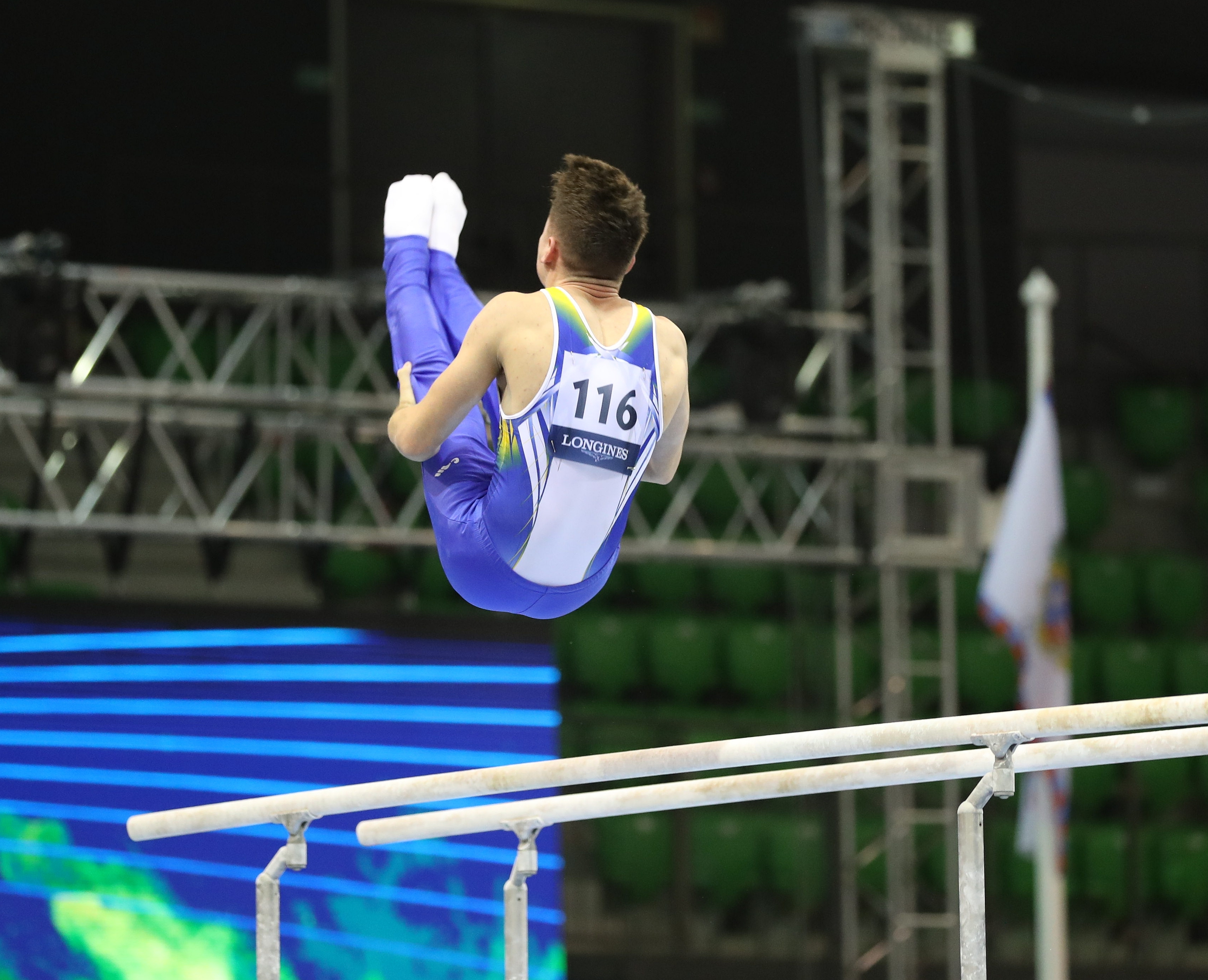
Parallel bars

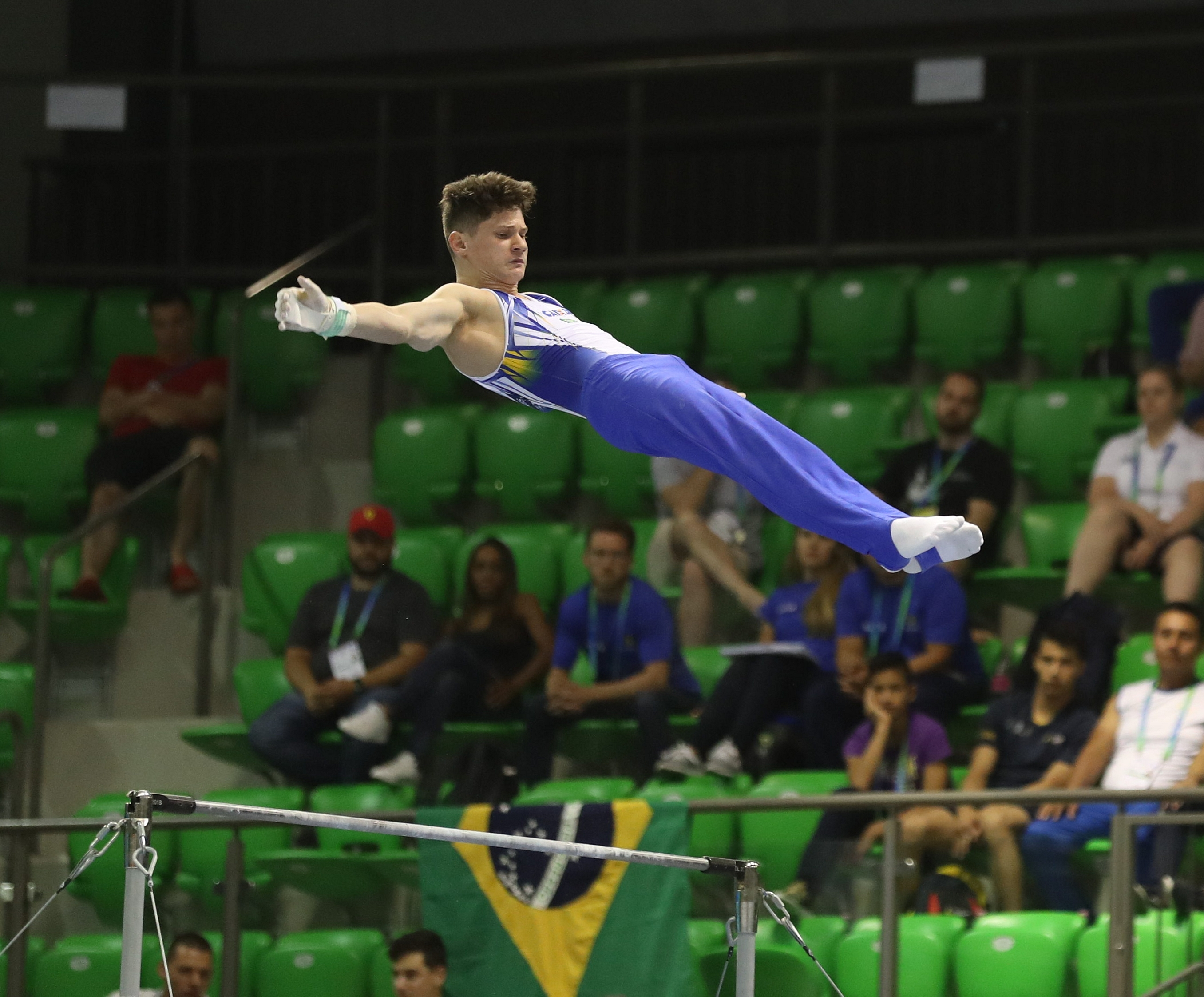
Horizontal bar

Soares at the 2019 Junior World Championships

=== Senior ===
==== 2020–2021 ====
Soares became age-eligible for senior-level competition in 2020. He made his senior international debut at the 2020 American Cup where he placed seventh. The remainder of the competitions were either canceled or postponed, including the 2020 Olympic Games, due to the global COVID-19 pandemic

Soares returned to competition at the 2021 Pan American Championships where he helped Brazil finish first as a team. Individually, Soares won bronze in the all-around behind Caio Souza and Paul Juda; as a result, he earned Brazil a non-nominative Olympic berth. Additionally, he won bronze on parallel bars Soares was selected to represent Brazil at the 2020 Olympic Games alongside Souza, Francisco Barretto Júnior, and Arthur Mariano. While there, Soares helped Brazil finish ninth as a team during qualifications. Individually, he qualified for the all-around final where he ultimately finished twentieth.

==== 2022–2024 ====
At the 2022 Pan American Championships, Soares helped Brazil finish second. In October, he competed at the South American Games, helping Brazil win gold as a team. Individually, he won bronze on horizontal bar. Later that month he competed at the World Championships where he helped Brazil finish seventh as a team. Individually, he placed seventeenth in the all-around.

Soares competed at the 2023 World Championships where Brazil finished thirteenth during qualifications and failed to qualify a full team to the 2024 Olympic Games. However, due to Soares finishing as one of the top eight all-around gymnasts not part of a qualified team, he earned himself an individual Olympic berth. A few weeks later Soares competed at the 2023 Pan American Games where he helped Brazil finish third as a team. Individually he won silver in the all-around behind Félix Dolci.

Soares started 2024 competing at the Antalya World Challenge Cup and the Doha World Cup; he won silver on horizontal bar in Antalya. In May he competed at the Pan American Championships where he helped Brazil place first. Individually, he won gold on pommel horse and horizontal bar and silver on parallel bars. At the 2024 Olympic Games, Soares qualified to the all-around final where he finished twenty-third.

==== 2025–present ====
Soares competed at the 2025 Pan American Championships where he won bronze in the all-around and silver on parallel bars. He next competed at the 2025 Summer World University Games. He placed fifth in the all-around despite his claim that "... I faltered," on the floor exercise. At the 2025 World Championships, Soares placed seventeenth in the all-around.

Soares started 2026 competing at the new mixed team version of the American Cup; Brazil finished seventh overall. He next competed at the 2026 DTB Pokal Team Challenge where he won silver on parallel bars. At the 2026 Pan American Championships, Soares won silver on parallel bars and horizontal behind Yul Moldauer and Ángel Barajas respectively.

== Competitive history ==
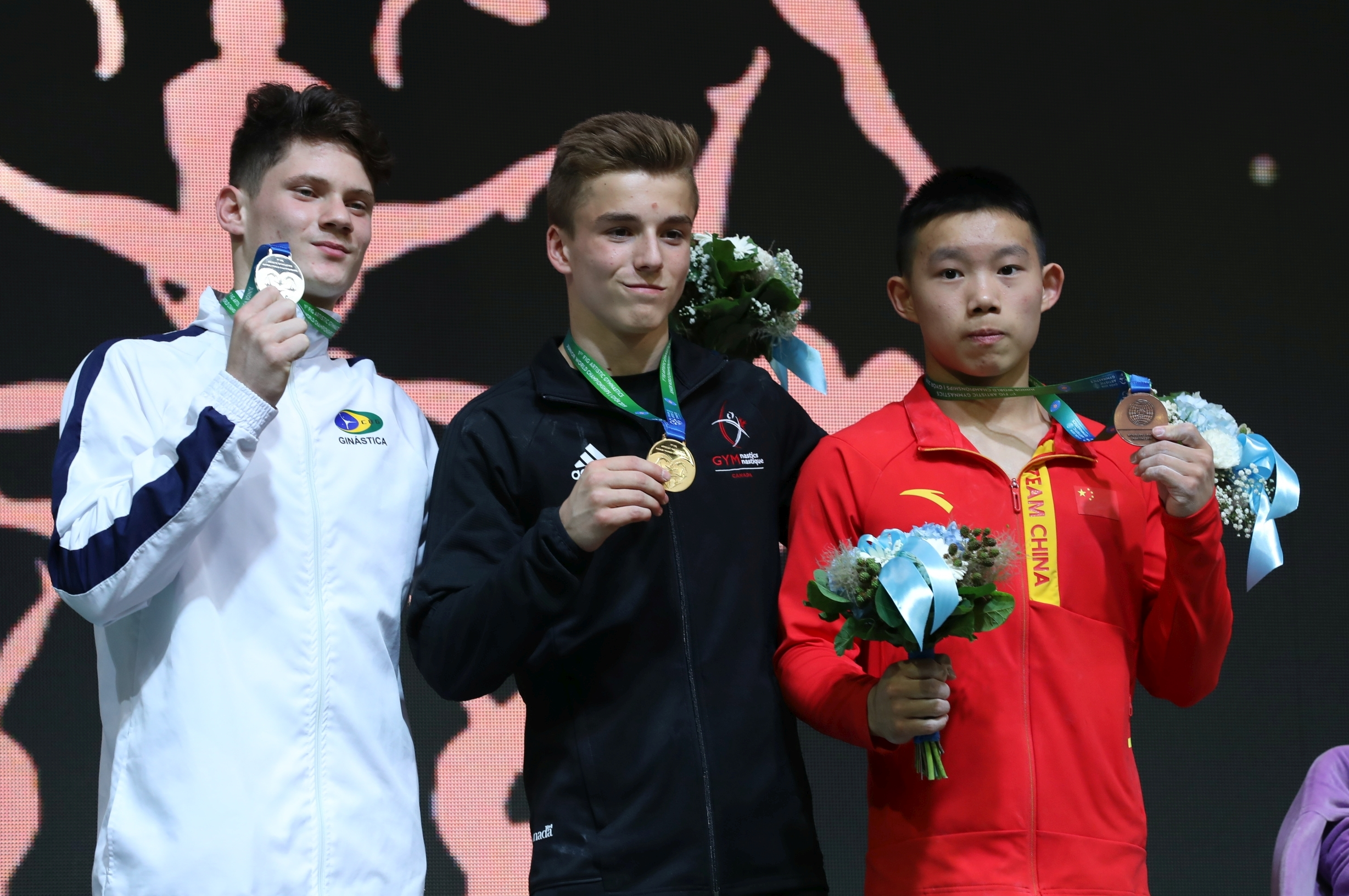
Soares (left) on the rings podium at the 2019 Junior World Championships

Competitive history of Diogo Soares at the junior level
Year	Event	Team	AA	FX	PH	SR	VT	PB	HB
2018	Gymnasiade		1st place, gold medalist(s)		2nd place, silver medalist(s)	4	1st place, gold medalist(s)	1st place, gold medalist(s)	4
2018	Pan American Championships	2nd place, silver medalist(s)	2nd place, silver medalist(s)	2nd place, silver medalist(s)		5	1st place, gold medalist(s)	3rd place, bronze medalist(s)	1st place, gold medalist(s)
2018	Wohnen Juniors Trophy		1st place, gold medalist(s)	3rd place, bronze medalist(s)	4	2nd place, silver medalist(s)	2nd place, silver medalist(s)	2nd place, silver medalist(s)	1st place, gold medalist(s)
2018	Youth Olympic Games		3rd place, bronze medalist(s)		7	6	6	9	2nd place, silver medalist(s)
2018	Brazilian Junior Championships		1st place, gold medalist(s)	1st place, gold medalist(s)	1st place, gold medalist(s)	1st place, gold medalist(s)	1st place, gold medalist(s)	1st place, gold medalist(s)	1st place, gold medalist(s)
2019	International Junior Team Cup		1st place, gold medalist(s)	1st place, gold medalist(s)		3rd place, bronze medalist(s)	4	1st place, gold medalist(s)	1st place, gold medalist(s)
2019	Junior World Championships	10	10			2nd place, silver medalist(s)	5		6
2019	Brazilian Championships		1st place, gold medalist(s)			3rd place, bronze medalist(s)	3rd place, bronze medalist(s)	1st place, gold medalist(s)	2nd place, silver medalist(s)
2019	Brazilian Junior Championships		1st place, gold medalist(s)	1st place, gold medalist(s)	1st place, gold medalist(s)	1st place, gold medalist(s)	4	1st place, gold medalist(s)	1st place, gold medalist(s)

Competitive history of Diogo Soares at the senior level
Year	Event	Team	AA	FX	PH	SR	VT	PB	HB
2020	American Cup		7						
2021
2021	Pan American Championships	1st place, gold medalist(s)	3rd place, bronze medalist(s)	8				3rd place, bronze medalist(s)	7
2021	Olympic Games	9	20						
2022	Brazil Trophy			1st place, gold medalist(s)	2nd place, silver medalist(s)			2nd place, silver medalist(s)	2nd place, silver medalist(s)
2022	Pan American Championships	2nd place, silver medalist(s)							
2022	Brazilian Championships		2nd place, silver medalist(s)		1st place, gold medalist(s)	3rd place, bronze medalist(s)	3rd place, bronze medalist(s)	3rd place, bronze medalist(s)	3rd place, bronze medalist(s)
2022	South American Games	1st place, gold medalist(s)							3rd place, bronze medalist(s)
2022	World Championships	7	17						
2023	Brazil Trophy			4	6	4	2nd place, silver medalist(s)	6	4
2023	Brazilian Championships				1st place, gold medalist(s)				
2023	Paris World Challenge Cup				6				
2023	World Championships	13	10						
2023	Pan American Games	3rd place, bronze medalist(s)	2nd place, silver medalist(s)					8	
2024	Antalya World Challenge Cup			6		8			2nd place, silver medalist(s)
2024	Doha World Cup							4	
2024	Pan American Championships	1st place, gold medalist(s)	6		1st place, gold medalist(s)			2nd place, silver medalist(s)	1st place, gold medalist(s)
2024	Brazil Trophy				1st place, gold medalist(s)				
2024	Olympic Games		23						
2024	Brazilian Championships						2nd place, silver medalist(s)	6	
2025
2025	Pan American Championships	4	3rd place, bronze medalist(s)	6	8			2nd place, silver medalist(s)	
2025	World University Games		5						
2025	World Championships	—N/a	17						R3
2026	American Cup	7							
2026	DTB Pokal Team Challenge	8						2nd place, silver medalist(s)	
2026	Pan American Championships	4	6		8			2nd place, silver medalist(s)	2nd place, silver medalist(s)
2026	South American Games	1st place, gold medalist(s)	2nd place, silver medalist(s)		8			2nd place, silver medalist(s)	2nd place, silver medalist(s)
2026	World Championships	19							
