= University of Santander =

Colombian private research university

University of Santander UDES
- Motto: Educación para los Superior
- Motto in English: Higher Education for the Higher
- Established: 1982
- Location: Bucaramanga, Colombia; 7.1055°N 73.0952°W
- Colors: Blue and white
- Website: www.udes.edu.co

The University of Santander (UDES) is a private research university, approved by the Colombian government through the Ministry of Education, according to legal status 810 1996; organized under the provisions of Act 30 of 1992. This university has different locations in Colombia and Latin America being the main campus located in Bucaramanga, other campus are Panama City (Panama), Bogotá, Cúcuta and Valledupar. Provides technical, undergraduate, graduate, postgraduate, and continual education programs.

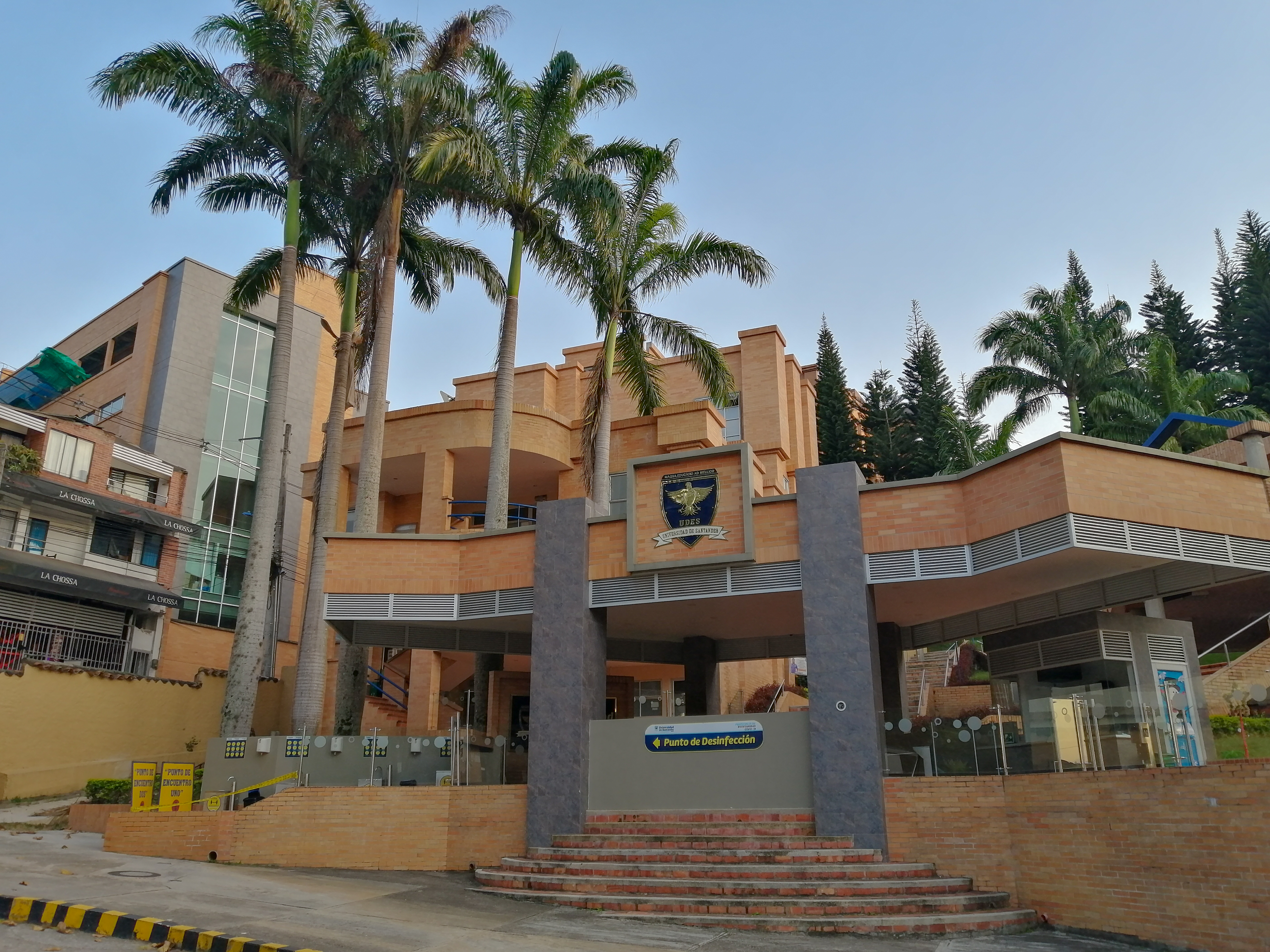
University of Santander

== Undergraduate programs ==
Faculty of Social Sciences
- Anthropology
- Psychology
- Social communication
- Law
Faculty of Sciences
- Industrial Microbiology
Communications faculty, Arts and Design
- Marketing and Advertising
Faculty of Engineering
- Environmental Engineering
- Civil Engineering
- Food Engineering
- Systems Engineering
- Electronic Engineering
- Industry Engineering
- AgroIndustrial Engineering
- Software Engineering
Faculty of Management
- Financial Management
- International Business Administration
Faculty of Agricultural Sciences
- Veterinary Medicine
Faculty of Political Science
- Law
Faculty of Medicine and Health Sciences
- Medicine
- Nursing
- Bacteriology and Clinical Laboratory
- Occupational Therapy
- Physiotherapy
- Phonoaudiology
- Surgical Instrumentation

== Technology programs ==
- Technology Supervision of Civil Works
- Technology Marketing and Advertising
- Technology in Graphic Design Advertising
- Food Technology
- Industry technology
- Systems Technology

== Postgraduate programs ==
- Business Management
- Specialization in Advertising Management
- Audit Specialization in Health Services
- Specialization in Marketing Management
- Specialization in Public Management
- Specialization in Health Services Management
- Specialization in Financial Management
- Specialization in Geotechnical Environmental
- Specialization in Traffic and Transportation Engineering
- Residency program in Critical care
- Master of Arts in Psychoanalytic Research
- Master of Science in Infectious Diseases Research

== Affiliated Higher Institutes of Research ==
Masira Institute for Biomedical Research
