= Gymnastics at the 2026 Central American and Caribbean Games =

- Venue: Pabellón de Gimnasia
- Location: Santo Domingo Este, Dominican Republic
- Dates: 26 July–6 August

The gymnastics competition at the 2026 Central American and Caribbean Games was held in Santo Domingo Este, Dominican Republic, from 26 July to 6 August 2026 at the Pabellón de Gimnasia.

== Participating nations ==
The number of athletes a nation entered is in parentheses beside the name of the country.

Artistic Gymnastics

- Aruba (1)
- Cayman Islands (1)
- Colombia (5)
- Costa Rica (7)
- Cuba (7)
- Dominican Republic (10)
- El Salvador (1)
- Guatemala (8)
- Haiti (1)
- Honduras (1)
- Jamaica (4)
- Mexico (10)
- Nicaragua (1)
- Panama (5)
- Puerto Rico (9)
- Trinidad and Tobago (2)
- Venezuela (4)

Rhythmic Gymnastics

- Aruba (1)
- Colombia (8)
- Costa Rica (2)
- Cuba (7)
- Dominican Republic (2)
- El Salvador (2)
- Guatemala (7)
- Mexico (8)
- Puerto Rico (3)
- Venezuela (8)

Trampoline Gymnastics

- Colombia (4)
- Cuba (4)
- Dominican Republic (4)
- El Salvador (1)
- Mexico (4)
- Venezuela (4)

== Medal table ==
* Host nation (Dominican Republic)

Rank	Nation	Gold	Silver	Bronze	Total
1	Mexico (MEX)	15	10	4	29
2	Colombia (COL)	7	9	2	18
3	Guatemala (GUA)	2	2	2	6
4	Puerto Rico (PUR)	2	1	3	6
5	Panama (PAN)	2	1	0	3
6	Venezuela (VEN)	0	4	3	7
7	Costa Rica (CRC)	0	1	4	5
8	Cuba (CUB)	0	0	5	5
9	Dominican Republic (DOM)*	0	0	3	3
10	Jamaica (JAM)	0	0	2	2
Totals (10 entries)		28	28	28	84

== Medal summary ==
=== Artistic ===
==== Men's events ====
Event	Gold	Silver	Bronze
Team all-around	Colombia; Jorman Álvarez; Ángel Barajas; Thomas Mejía; Camilo Vera; Yan Zabala	Puerto Rico; Nelson Guilbe; José López; Pablo Pérez; Jensuel Soto; Francisco Vélez	Mexico; Juan David Hernández; Isaac Núñez; Juan Pablo Porras; Cristian Ramírez; Mario Rojas
Individual all-around	Ángel Barajas; Colombia	Camilo Vera; Colombia	Jaycko Bourdet; Guatemala
Floor	Jorge Vega; Guatemala	Camilo Vera; Colombia	José López; Puerto Rico
Pommel horse	Nelson Guilbe; Puerto Rico	Camilo Vera; Colombia	Juan Pablo Porras; Mexico
Rings	Francisco Vélez; Puerto Rico	Ángel Barajas; Colombia	Ariel Villalobos; Costa Rica
Vault	Jorge Vega; Guatemala	Camilo Vera; Colombia	Jensuel Soto; Puerto Rico
Parallel bars	Ángel Barajas; Colombia	Yan Zabala; Colombia	Francisco Vélez; Puerto Rico
Horizontal bar	Ángel Barajas; Colombia	Yan Zabala; Colombia	Isaac Núñez; Mexico

==== Women's events ====
Event	Gold	Silver	Bronze
Team all-around	Mexico; Paulina Campos; Natalia Escalera; Dominica Escartín; Paulina Guerra; Victoria Mata	Panama; Ana Lucía Beitia; Ana Gabriela Gutiérrez; Alyiah Lide de León; Tatiana Tapia	Dominican Republic; Demi Dash; Sophia Díaz; Melissa Fernández; Yamilet Peña; Analis Pérez
Individual all-around	Natalia Escalera; Mexico	Victoria Mata; Mexico	Jahzara Ranger; Jamaica
Vault	Natalia Escalera; Mexico	Victoria Mata; Mexico	Jahzara Ranger; Jamaica
Uneven bars	Victoria Mata; Mexico	Rachel Rodríguez; Costa Rica	Keyla Leyva; Cuba
Balance beam	Alyiah Lide de León; Panama	Natalia Escalera; Mexico	Brithany Herrera; Guatemala
Floor	Alyiah Lide de León; Panama	Paulina Guerra; Mexico	Samantha Marín; Costa Rica

=== Rhythmic ===
Event	Gold	Silver	Bronze
Team all-around	Mexico; Ana Luisa Abraham; Marina Malpica; Désirée Portugal	Venezuela; Luciana Caraballo; Jimena Dominguez; Alejandra Montilla	Colombia; Natalia Dreszer; Emiliana Vargas; Oriana Viñas
Individual all-around	Marina Malpica; Mexico	Ana Luisa Abraham; Mexico	Isabella Rojas; Cuba
Hoop	Ana Luisa Abraham; Mexico	María Daniella González; Guatemala	Gloriana Sánchez; Costa Rica
Ball	Marina Malpica; Mexico	Désirée Portugal; Mexico	Isabella Rojas; Cuba
Clubs	Marina Malpica; Mexico	Ana Luisa Abraham; Mexico	Jimena Dominguez; Venezuela
Ribbon	Marina Malpica; Mexico	María Daniella González; Guatemala	Gloriana Sánchez; Costa Rica
5 balls	Mexico; Dalia Alcocer; Julia Gutiérrez; Kimberly Salazar; Adirem Tejeda; Giselle Torres	Colombia; Natalia Jiménez; Adriana Mantilla; Marina Mendoza; Ashlee Patiño; Kizzy Rivas	Cuba; Adrianet Dalmau; Andrea Fuentes; Elizabeth González; Katherine Hernández; Alys Pacheco
3 hoops & 4 clubs	Mexico; Dalia Alcocer; Julia Gutiérrez; Kimberly Salazar; Adirem Tejeda; Giselle Torres	Colombia; Natalia Jiménez; Adriana Mantilla; Marina Mendoza; Ashlee Patiño; Kizzy Rivas	Cuba; Adrianet Dalmau; Andrea Fuentes; Elizabeth González; Katherine Hernández; Alys Pacheco
Team general	Mexico; Dalia Alcocer; Julia Gutiérrez; Kimberly Salazar; Adirem Tejeda; Giselle Torres	Venezuela; Camila Campos; Mariana Dona; María Escobar; Gabriela Rodríguez; Samantha Rojas	Colombia; Natalia Jiménez; Adriana Mantilla; Marina Mendoza; Ashlee Patiño; Kizzy Rivas

=== Trampoline ===
Event	Gold	Silver	Bronze
Men's individual	Donovan Guevara; Mexico	David Carballo; Mexico	Jezreel González; Venezuela
Women's individual	Nicole Castellanos; Colombia	Dafne Navarro; Mexico	Patricia Núñez; Mexico
Men's synchronised	Colombia; Diego Giraldo; Santiago Parra	Venezuela; Carlos Betancourt; Jezreel González	Dominican Republic; Emil de la Rosa; Junior Mateo
Women's synchronised	Mexico; Dafne Navarro; Patricia Núñez	Venezuela; Parvati Alberti; Alida Rojo	Dominican Republic; Laura Polanco; Eva Vásquez
Mixed synchronised	Colombia; Diego Giraldo; Nicole Castellanos	Mexico; Donovan Guevara; Dafne Navarro	Venezuela; Jezreel González; Alida Rojo
