= 2026 Pan American Artistic Gymnastics Championships =

Gymnastics event in Rio de Janeiro, Brazil

Pan American Gymnastics Championships
- Venue: Parque Olímpico - Carioca Arena 1
- Location: Rio de Janeiro, Brazil
- Date: June 17–21, 2026

The 2026 Pan American Gymnastics Championships was an artistic gymnastics competition that took place in Rio de Janeiro, Brazil from June 17–21. It featured both senior and junior level competition. Rio de Janeiro previously hosted the competition in 2005, 2021, and 2022.

== Participating countries ==
- Argentina
- Aruba
- Barbados
- Bolivia
- Brazil
- Canada
- Cayman Islands
- Chile
- Colombia
- Costa Rica
- Cuba
- Dominican Republic
- Ecuador
- El Salvador
- Guatemala
- Haiti
- Honduras
- Jamaica
- Mexico
- Nicaragua
- Panama
- Peru
- Puerto Rico
- Trinidad and Tobago
- United States
- Uruguay
- Venezuela

== Medalists ==
=== Senior ===
Event	Gold	Silver	Bronze
Men
Team all-around	Canada; Jordan Carroll; René Cournoyer; Félix Dolci; William Émard; Xavier Olasz; Addyson Cheladyn	Colombia; Jorman Álvarez; Ángel Barajas; Thomas Mejía; Camilo Vera; Yan Zabala	United States; Taylor Burkhart; Patrick Hoopes; Riley Loos; Yul Moldauer; Kameron Nelson; Brandon Dang
Individual all-around	(Colombia) Camilo Vera	(Colombia) Ángel Barajas	(United States) Yul Moldauer
Floor exercise	(Guatemala) Jorge Vega	(Colombia) Ángel Barajas	(Brazil) Vitaliy Guimaraes
Pommel horse	(United States) Patrick Hoopes	(Canada) Jordan Carroll	(Colombia) Ángel Barajas
Rings	(Canada) William Émard	(Chile) Joaquín Álvarez	(Canada) Félix Dolci
Vault	(Colombia) Camilo Vera	(Chile) Josué Armijo	(Puerto Rico) José López
Parallel bars	(United States) Yul Moldauer	(Brazil) Diogo Soares	(Cuba) Diorges Escobar
Horizontal bar	(Colombia) Ángel Barajas	(Brazil) Diogo Soares	(Canada) Félix Dolci (Brazil) Arthur Mariano
Women
Team all-around	United States; Charleigh Bullock; Claire Pease; Hezly Rivera; Alessia Rosa; Simone Rose; Lila Richardson	Brazil; Rebeca Andrade; Gabriela Bouças; Thaís Fidélis; Julia Soares; Sophia Weisberg; Gabriela Barbosa	Canada; Gabrielle Black; Lia Monica Fontaine; Alyssa Guerrier-Calixte; Lia Redick; Aurélie Tran; Victoriane Charron
Individual all-around	(United States) Claire Pease	(United States) Charleigh Bullock	(Brazil) Thaís Fidélis
Vault	(Brazil) Rebeca Andrade	(Canada) Lia Monica Fontaine	(United States) Claire Pease
Uneven bars	(Canada) Aurélie Tran	(United States) Simone Rose	(Brazil) Sophia Weisberg
Balance beam	(Argentina) Isabella Ajalla	(United States) Simone Rose	(Brazil) Thaís Fidélis
Floor exercise	(United States) Claire Pease	(Canada) Lia Redick	(Argentina) Isabella Ajalla

=== Junior ===
Event	Gold	Silver	Bronze
Boys
Team all-around	United States; Maksim Kan; Ori Reilly; Anthony Rushcheinsky; Hunter Simpson	Canada; Jaydon De Silva; Reuben Dykstra; Edouard Nadeau; Thomas Tittley	Brazil; Tiago Capella; Matheus Fernandes; Ivan Oliveira; Rafael Passos
Individual all-around	(Canada) Thomas Tittley	(Canada) Jaydon De Silva	(Argentina) Benjamín Fernández
Floor exercise	(Canada) Jaydon De Silva (Argentina) Benjamín Fernández (Chile) Arturo Rossel	Not awarded	
Pommel horse	(Colombia) Samuel López	(United States) Maksim Kan	(Chile) Matias Martinez
Rings	(Canada) Thomas Tittley	(United States) Maksim Kan	(Mexico) Aaron Ibarra
Vault	(Venezuela) Caleb Ysava	(Chile) Augustin Espinosa	(Chile) Arturo Rossel
Parallel bars	(Mexico) Aaron Ibarra	(United States) Hunter Simpson	(United States) Ori Reilly
Horizontal bar	(Ecuador) Domenick Godoy	(United States) Ori Reilly	(Canada) Thomas Tittley
Girls
Team all-around	United States; Vivi Crain; Amia Pugh-Banks; Addalye VanGrinsven; Sydney Williams; Paisley Ritger	Canada; Marion Desjardins; Mackenzie Grant; Taya Macey; Nikita Theodat	Brazil; Sophia Carvalho; Ana Paula Delgado; Brenda Faria; Yasmin Mota; Isadora Marquez
Individual all-around	(United States) Amia Pugh-Banks	(United States) Vivi Crain	(Canada) Taya Macey
Vault	(United States) Amia Pugh-Banks	(United States) Addalye VanGrinsven	(Argentina) Eugenia Garcia
Uneven bars	(United States) Sydney Williams	(Venezuela) Mía Garcés	(United States) Addalye VanGrinsven
Balance beam	(United States) Vivi Crain	(United States) Addalye VanGrinsven	(Venezuela) Mía Garcés
Floor exercise	(United States) Amia Pugh-Banks (Canada) Nikita Theodat	Not awarded	(United States) Addalye VanGrinsven

== Medal table ==
* Host nation (Brazil)

Rank	Nation	Gold	Silver	Bronze	Total
1	United States	12	10	6	28
2	Canada	7	6	5	18
3	Colombia	4	3	1	8
4	Argentina	2	0	3	5
5	Brazil*	1	3	7	11
6	Chile	1	3	2	6
7	Venezuela	1	1	1	3
8	Mexico	1	0	1	2
9	Ecuador	1	0	0	1
9	Guatemala	1	0	0	1
11	Cuba	0	0	1	1
11	Puerto Rico	0	0	1	1
Totals (12 entries)		31	26	28	85

== Men's results ==
=== Team ===
All countries participated in the team event with no prior qualification. Below are the top eight teams.

Rank	Team	Floor (gymnastics)	Pommel horse	Rings (gymnastics)	Vault (gymnastics)	Parallel bars	Horizontal bar	Total
1st place, gold medalist(s)	Canada	40.165 (1)	40.132 (1)	41.099 (1)	41.632 (1)	39.766 (3)	40.232 (2)	243.026
1st place, gold medalist(s)	Jordan Carroll		14.266					243.026
1st place, gold medalist(s)	René Cournoyer	13.366	13.000	13.366	13.800	13.800	13.466	243.026
1st place, gold medalist(s)	Félix Dolci	14.133		13.900	13.666	13.366	14.466	243.026
1st place, gold medalist(s)	William Émard	12.666	11.833	13.833	14.166	12.600	10.600	243.026
1st place, gold medalist(s)	Xavier Olasz	12.666	12.866	12.400	13.400	12.466	12.300	243.026
2nd place, silver medalist(s)	Colombia	39.666 (5)	38.666 (3)	39.799 (3)	40.632 (3)	41.099 (1)	41.732 (1)	241.594
2nd place, silver medalist(s)	Jorman Álvarez			12.700		13.600		241.594
2nd place, silver medalist(s)	Ángel Barajas	13.633	13.200	13.533	13.900	14.533	14.266	241.594
2nd place, silver medalist(s)	Thomas Mejía	12.166	12.000	10.700	13.266	12.966	11.400	241.594
2nd place, silver medalist(s)	Camilo Vera	13.833	13.133	13.566	13.466	12.600	13.700	241.594
2nd place, silver medalist(s)	Yan Zabala	12.200	12.333		12.800		13.766	241.594
3rd place, bronze medalist(s)	United States	39.799 (3)	39.733 (2)	40.899 (2)	38.799 (12)	39.599 (4)	37.132 (7)	235.961
3rd place, bronze medalist(s)	Taylor Burkhart	13.000		13.566	12.633	13.533	13.966	235.961
3rd place, bronze medalist(s)	Patrick Hoopes		14.600					235.961
3rd place, bronze medalist(s)	Riley Loos	13.533	11.900	13.700	11.333			235.961
3rd place, bronze medalist(s)	Yul Moldauer	13.233	13.233	13.633	13.566	13.866	13.333	235.961
3rd place, bronze medalist(s)	Kameron Nelson	13.033		13.266	12.600	12.200	9.833	235.961
4	Brazil	39.799 (3)	37.032 (5)	38.299 (6)	39.832 (9)	40.066 (2)	39.899 (3)	234.927
4	Rogério Borges	13.166	11.800	12.233	12.733			234.927
4	Vitaliy Guimaraes	13.400	11.800	12.233	12.733	12.333	11.533	234.927
4	Arthur Mariano	13.166			13.666	13.066	13.933	234.927
4	Diogo Soares	13.233	13.266	12.833	13.433	13.500	14.033	234.927
4	Caio Souza		11.966	13.233		13.500	11.933	234.927
5	Puerto Rico	38.199 (7)	36.432 (6)	38.665 (5)	39.966 (7)	36.665 (8)	38.099 (4)	228.026
5	Nelson Guilbe		13.733					228.026
5	José López	12.866	10.666	12.833	13.900	12.233	13.166	228.026
5	Pablo Pérez	12.633		12.566	13.000			228.026
5	Jensuel Soto	12.700	12.033	12.500	12.533	11.866	12.600	228.026
5	Francisco Vélez	12.333		13.266	13.066	12.566	12.333	228.026
6	Argentina	39.899 (2)	35.966 (7)	37.200 (7)	39.932 (8)	36.932 (7)	37.465 (5)	227.394
6	Luca Alfieri		11.500			11.766	12.733	227.394
6	Ivo Chiapponi	13.233	11.633	11.566	12.866	12.233	10.300	227.394
6	Santiago Mayol	13.566	12.733	12.000	13.300	12.366	12.366	227.394
6	Nahuel Pardo	13.100	11.600	11.600	12.833	12.333	12.366	227.394
6	Daniel Villafañe	12.600		13.600	13.766			227.394
7	Mexico	38.166 (8)	35.322 (8)	35.866 (9)	40.132 (6)	36.399 (9)	37.232 (6)	223.127
7	Rodrigo Gómez	12.633		10.966	13.000		11.766	223.127
7	Juan Hernández	13.100	11.933		13.766	12.133		223.127
7	Isaac Núñez	12.433	12.533	12.133	12.300	13.066	12.933	223.127
7	Cristian Ramírez		8.900	12.700		11.200	11.700	223.127
7	Mario Rojas	11.866	10.866	11.033	13.366	10.733	12.533	223.127
8	Chile	36.233 (10)	34.033 (11)	39.099 (4)	40.299 (4)	37.299 (5)	35.800 (9)	222.763
8	Joaquín Álvarez			13.733		12.633	11.500	222.763
8	Joel Álvarez	12.633	11.300	12.266	13.533	12.600	11.000	222.763
8	Josué Armijo	11.300	11.033		13.166		10.400	222.763
8	Diego Espejo	10.466	11.700	13.100		12.066		222.763
8	Luciano Letelier	12.300	10.566	11.900	13.600	11.400	13.300	222.763

=== Individual all-around ===
Rank	Gymnast	Floor (gymnastics)	Pommel horse	Rings (gymnastics)	Vault (gymnastics)	Parallel bars	Horizontal bar	Total
1st place, gold medalist(s)	(Colombia) Camilo Vera	13.233	13.000	13.433	14.033	13.366	14.200	81.265
2nd place, silver medalist(s)	(Colombia) Ángel Barajas	13.533	13.266	13.266	13.800	14.100	12.800	80.765
3rd place, bronze medalist(s)	(United States) Yul Moldauer	12.833	13.233	13.133	12.633	14.233	12.800	78.865
4	(Canada) René Cournoyer	12.400	13.133	12.400	13.566	13.633	13.266	78.398
5	(Canada) Xavier Olasz	12.733	13.000	12.033	13.200	12.766	11.966	75.698
6	(Brazil) Diogo Soares	13.133	12.366	12.266	12.366	12.900	12.300	75.331
7	(Jamaica) Elel Wahrmann-Baker	12.833	12.166	12.300	12.466	12.400	12.566	74.731
8	(Mexico) Isaac Núñez	13.000	11.400	12.066	13.333	12.100	12.733	74.632
9	(Cuba) Diorges Escobar	11.433	11.466	11.433	13.400	13.300	13.433	74.465
10	(Guatemala) Jefferson Rahi Garcia	12.700	12.966	10.833	13.033	12.366	11.866	73.764
11	(Puerto Rico) José Lopéz	11.133	10.900	12.566	13.666	12.666	12.300	73.231
12	(Argentina) Santiago Mayol	11.566	13.233	11.400	13.300	11.466	12.100	73.065
13	(Guatemala) Mario Taperio	11.866	12.833	11.733	13.066	12.600	10.700	72.798
14	(Ecuador) Stefano Romero	12.700	11.833	12.266	12.100	10.933	11.766	71.598
15	(Ecuador) Daniel Chica	12.633	11.233	12.300	12.566	11.466	11.400	71.598
16	(Peru) Edward Gonzales	12.633	11.533	9.533	13.466	11.666	12.466	71.297
17	(Trinidad and Tobago) Chane Cumbermack	13.133	10.766	11.100	13.633	11.100	11.400	71.132
18	(Cuba) Argenis Castaneda	10.466	11.833	11.966	14.000	11.066	10.700	70.031
19	(Puerto Rico) Jensuel Soto	11.900	10.300	9.866	12.933	12.800	11.033	68.832
20	(Argentina) Nahuel Pardo	12.000	10.233	10.433	12.333	11.066	12.166	68.231
21	(Trinidad and Tobago) Jameel Ali	11.766	10.000	12.100	12.200	11.300	10.433	67.799
22	(Jamaica) Clayton Bell	11.833	9.000	10.500	13.233	10.166	10.466	65.168
23	(Venezuela) Sebastian Torres	11.800	10.933	9.566	12.833	11.033	8.533	64.698

=== Floor exercise ===
Rank	Gymnast	D Score	E Score	Pen.	Bon.	Total
1st place, gold medalist(s)	(Guatemala) Jorge Vega	5.7	8.566	-0.1		14.166
2nd place, silver medalist(s)	(Colombia) Ángel Barajas	5.5	8.400			13.900
3rd place, bronze medalist(s)	(Brazil) Vitaliy Guimaraes	5.1	8.600			13.700
4	(Canada) Félix Dolci	5.2	8.500			13.700
5	(Canada) René Cournoyer	5.1	8.366			13.466
6	(Argentina) Ivo Chiapponi	4.6	8.366		0.1	13.066
7	(Colombia) Camilo Vera	4.8	7.266		0.1	12.166
8	(Argentina) Santiago Mayol	5.1	6.866			11.966

=== Pommel horse ===
Rank	Gymnast	D Score	E Score	Pen.	Bon.	Total
1st place, gold medalist(s)	(United States) Patrick Hoopes	6.0	8.566			14.566
2nd place, silver medalist(s)	(Canada) Jordan Carroll	5.8	8.700			14.500
3rd place, bronze medalist(s)	(Colombia) Ángel Barajas	5.7	8.100			13.800
4	(United States) Yul Moldauer	5.3	8.333			13.633
5	(Colombia) Camilo Vera	5.2	8.166			13.366
6	(Canada) René Cournoyer	4.7	8.433			13.133
7	(Puerto Rico) Nelson Guilbe	5.5	7.000			12.500
8	(Brazil) Diogo Soares	4.1	6.400			10.500

=== Rings ===
Rank	Gymnast	D Score	E Score	Pen.	Bon.	Total
1st place, gold medalist(s)	(Canada) William Émard	5.0	8.766			13.766
2nd place, silver medalist(s)	(Chile) Joaquín Álvarez	5.1	8.466			13.566
3rd place, bronze medalist(s)	(Canada) Félix Dolci	5.0	8.500			13.500
4	(United States) Yul Moldauer	5.1	8.300		0.1	13.500
5	(Colombia) Camilo Vera	4.9	8.533			13.433
6	(United States) Riley Loos	5.0	8.400			13.400
6	(Argentina) Daniel Villafañe	5.0	8.400			13.400
8	(Colombia) Ángel Barajas	5.2	7.866			13.066

=== Vault ===
Rank	Gymnast	Vault 1					Vault 2					Total
Rank	Gymnast	D Score	E Score	Pen.	Bon.	Score 1	D Score	E Score	Pen.	Bon.	Score 2	Total
1st place, gold medalist(s)	(Colombia) Camilo Vera	4.8	9.033			13.833	5.2	8.800	-0.1		13.900	13.866
2nd place, silver medalist(s)	(Chile) Josué Armijo	4.8	8.866			13.666	4.4	9.100			13.500	13.583
3rd place, bronze medalist(s)	(Puerto Rico) José López	4.8	8.800			13.600	5.2	8.000			13.200	13.400
4	(Peru) Daniel Agüero	4.8	8.866			13.666	4.4	8.733			13.133	13.399
5	(United States) Kameron Nelson	5.2	7.700	-0.3		12.600	4.8	8.966			13.766	13.183
6	(Jamaica) Clayton Bell	4.4	9.233		0.1	13.733	4.4	7.600	-0.1		11.900	12.816
7	(Guatemala) Jorge Vega	5.2	8.000	-0.1		13.100	5.0	7.600	-0.3		12.300	12.700
8	(Dominican Republic) Wilfry Contreras	5.2	7.833			13.033	4.8	7.533			12.333	12.683

=== Parallel bars ===
Rank	Gymnast	D Score	E Score	Pen.	Bon.	Total
1st place, gold medalist(s)	(United States) Yul Moldauer	5.4	8.800			14.200
2nd place, silver medalist(s)	(Brazil) Diogo Soares	5.5	8.333		0.1	13.933
3rd place, bronze medalist(s)	(Cuba) Diorges Escobar	5.2	8.500			13.700
4	(Brazil) Caio Souza	4.9	8.500			13.400
5	(Canada) René Cournoyer	5.4	8.000			13.400
6	(Colombia) Ángel Barajas	5.7	7.700			13.400
7	(United States) Taylor Burkhart	5.0	8.233			13.233
8	(Colombia) Jorman Álvarez	5.5	7.700			13.200

=== Horizontal bar ===
Rank	Gymnast	D Score	E Score	Pen.	Bon.	Total
1st place, gold medalist(s)	(Colombia) Ángel Barajas	6.7	8.433		0.1	15.233
2nd place, silver medalist(s)	(Brazil) Diogo Soares	5.8	8.233		0.1	14.133
3rd place, bronze medalist(s)	(Canada) Félix Dolci	5.7	8.333			14.033
3rd place, bronze medalist(s)	(Brazil) Arthur Mariano	5.7	8.333			14.033
5	(Colombia) Yan Zabala	5.8	8.200			14.000
6	(United States) Taylor Burkhart	5.4	6.933			12.333
7	(United States) Yul Moldauer	5.0	7.200			12.200
8	(Canada) René Cournoyer	4.9	6.733			11.633

== Women's results ==
=== Team ===
All countries participated in the team event with no prior qualification. Below are the top eight teams.

Rank	Team	Vault (gymnastics)	Uneven bars	Balance beam	Floor (gymnastics)	Total
1st place, gold medalist(s)	United States	42.398 (1)	40.633 (1)	39.298 (2)	39.299 (1)	161.628
1st place, gold medalist(s)	Charleigh Bullock	14.366	13.200	13.566	13.033	161.628
1st place, gold medalist(s)	Claire Pease	14.266	14.100	12.166	13.400	161.628
1st place, gold medalist(s)	Hezly Rivera	13.400				161.628
1st place, gold medalist(s)	Alessia Rosa		12.533	11.300	12.866	161.628
1st place, gold medalist(s)	Simone Rose	13.766	13.333	13.566	12.533	161.628
2nd place, silver medalist(s)	Brazil	41.599 (3)	38.699 (4)	39.999 (1)	37.499 (3)	157.796
2nd place, silver medalist(s)	Rebeca Andrade	14.533				157.796
2nd place, silver medalist(s)	Gabriela Bouças	13.500	13.033	10.600	11.533	157.796
2nd place, silver medalist(s)	Thaís Fidélis	13.566	12.733	13.833	12.833	157.796
2nd place, silver medalist(s)	Julia Soares		12.533	13.566	12.166	157.796
2nd place, silver medalist(s)	Sophia Weisberg	13.366	12.933	12.600	12.500	157.796
3rd place, bronze medalist(s)	Canada	41.632 (2)	38.966 (3)	38.000 (4)	38.399 (2)	156.997
3rd place, bronze medalist(s)	Gabrielle Black	13.966	12.233	12.100	12.800	156.997
3rd place, bronze medalist(s)	Lia Monica Fontaine	13.800	12.733	12.066	12.766	156.997
3rd place, bronze medalist(s)	Alyssa Guerrier-Calixte			12.600	12.333	156.997
3rd place, bronze medalist(s)	Lia Redick	13.866	12.933	13.300	12.833	156.997
3rd place, bronze medalist(s)	Aurélie Tran	13.533	13.300			156.997
4	Argentina	40.099 (4)	39.899 (2)	38.300 (3)	36.099 (5)	154.397
4	Emilia Acosta	13.533	12.933	11.400	11.733	154.397
4	Isabella Ajalla	13.500	12.600	13.000	12.533	154.397
4	Delfina Estoco	12.766			11.800	154.397
4	Julieta Lucas	13.066	13.533	13.000	12.533	154.397
4	Meline Mesropian		13.433	13.100		154.397
5	Mexico	39.866 (6)	38.299 (5)	36.299 (6)	36.632 (4)	151.096
5	Paulina Campos		12.233	10.766		151.096
5	Dominica Escartín	12.933			11.933	151.096
5	Paulina Guerra	12.833	12.766	9.666	10.366	151.096
5	Victoria Mata	13.533	12.800	12.233	11.733	151.096
5	Michelle Pineda	13.400	12.733	13.300	12.966	151.096
6	Panama	40.099 (4)	37.365 (6)	36.833 (5)	35.865 (6)	150.162
6	Ana Lucia Beitia	13.333	11.733	11.566	11.366	150.162
6	Ana Gabriela Gutierrez	13.200	13.166	12.600	12.366	150.162
6	Hillary Heron	13.566	11.200	12.600	12.133	150.162
6	Alyiah Lide de León	13.066	12.466	11.633	10.600	150.162
7	Costa Rica	37.533 (12)	35.565 (7)	34.166 (11)	33.932 (7)	141.196
7	Mariana Andrade			12.100		141.196
7	Mariana Guevara	11.833	11.466	8.733	11.233	141.196
7	Samantha Marín	12.900	11.833	12.033	11.933	141.196
7	Franciny Morales	11.500	9.533		10.100	141.196
7	Rachel Rodriguez	12.800	12.266	10.033	10.766	141.196
8	Ecuador	37.732 (9)	33.766 (8)	34.299 (10)	32.833 (11)	138.630
8	Ashley Bohórquez	13.266	11.433	11.166	11.500	138.630
8	Nicole Llugcha	11.966	8.533	11.200	9.633	138.630
8	Alaís Perea	12.500	12.200	11.933	11.700	138.630
8	Melina Tripul		10.133	8.400		138.630

=== Individual all-around ===
Rank	Gymnast	Vault (gymnastics)	Uneven bars	Balance beam	Floor (gymnastics)	Total
1st place, gold medalist(s)	(United States) Claire Pease	14.166	13.666	13.533	13.133	54.498
2nd place, silver medalist(s)	(United States) Charleigh Bullock	13.133	14.266	13.333	13.300	54.032
3rd place, bronze medalist(s)	(Brazil) Thaís Fidélis	13.433	12.466	13.233	13.100	52.232
4	(Brazil) Sophia Weisberg	13.166	12.833	12.533	12.833	51.365
5	(Canada) Lia Monica Fontaine	14.000	13.000	10.800	13.366	51.166
6	(Canada) Lia Redick	13.633	11.400	12.400	13.366	50.799
7	(Argentina) Isabella Ajalla	13.400	12.266	11.900	13.033	50.599
8	(Argentina) Julieta Lucas	12.933	13.466	11.800	12.100	50.299
9	(Mexico) Victoria Mata	13.266	12.000	12.400	11.533	49.199
10	(Panama) Hillary Heron	12.000	11.966	12.633	12.500	49.099
11	(Jamaica) Jahzara Ranger	13.633	10.033	12.500	12.100	48.266
12	(Panama) Ana Gabriela Gutierrez	12.266	12.066	11.733	11.933	47.998
13	(Peru) Fabiola Diaz	12.400	11.666	11.766	11.933	47.765
14	(Ecuador) Ashley Bohórquez	13.200	12.000	10.666	11.766	47.632
15	(Guatemala) Brithany Herrera	11.966	12.000	11.266	11.833	47.065
16	(Costa Rica) Samantha Marín	13.200	10.766	11.200	11.800	46.966
17	(Costa Rica) Rachel Rodriguez	12.466	11.833	10.900	11.700	46.899
18	(Dominican Republic) Sophia Diaz	13.033	10.466	11.500	11.700	46.699
19	(Ecuador) Alaís Perea	12.466	12.166	10.700	11.366	46.698
20	(Mexico) Michelle Pineda	12.000	10.433	11.833	11.366	45.632
21	(Chile) Paula Carvajal	12.133	11.200	10.266	10.266	43.865
22	(Puerto Rico) Karelys Diaz	12.100	9.233	10.566	11.833	43.732
23	(Peru) Luana Roda	11.633	9.766	11.333	9.633	42.365
–	(Cuba) Keyla Leyva	–	–	–	10.766	DNF

=== Vault ===
Rank	Gymnast	Vault 1				Vault 2				Bonus	Total
Rank	Gymnast	D Score	E Score	Pen.	Score 1	D Score	E Score	Pen.	Score 2	Bonus	Total
1st place, gold medalist(s)	(Brazil) Rebeca Andrade	5.0	9.433		14.433	4.8	9.000	-0.1	13.700	0.2	14.266
2nd place, silver medalist(s)	(Canada) Lia Monica Fontaine	5.0	9.133		14.133	4.8	9.166		13.966	0.2	14.249
3rd place, bronze medalist(s)	(United States) Claire Pease	5.0	9.166		14.166	4.2	9.066		13.266	0.2	13.916
4	(Mexico) Victoria Mata	4.6	8.800		13.400	4.2	8.866		13.066	0.2	13.433
5	(Panama) Hillary Heron	4.6	8.800		13.400	4.4	8.466	-0.1	12.766	0.2	13.283
6	(United States) Simone Rose	4.6	8.700	-0.1	13.200	4.2	8.633		12.833	0.2	13.216
7	(Argentina) Emilia Acosta	4.6	8.666		13.266	4.2	8.500		12.700	0.2	13.183
8	(Canada) Gabrielle Black	4.6	8.933	-0.1	13.433	3.8	8.866		12.666		13.049

=== Uneven bars ===
Rank	Gymnast	D Score	E Score	Pen.	Total
1st place, gold medalist(s)	(Canada) Aurélie Tran	5.3	8.233		13.533
2nd place, silver medalist(s)	(United States) Simone Rose	5.8	7.533		13.333
3rd place, bronze medalist(s)	(Brazil) Sophia Weisberg	5.2	7.833		13.033
4	(Argentina) Meline Mesropian	5.9	6.733		12.633
5	(United States) Claire Pease	5.2	7.366		12.566
6	(Panama) Ana Gutiérrez	5.5	7.033		12.533
7	(Argentina) Julieta Lucas	5.7	6.466		12.166
8	(Brazil) Gabriela Bouças	5.0	6.500		11.500

=== Balance beam ===
Rank	Gymnast	D Score	E Score	Pen.	Total
1st place, gold medalist(s)	(Argentina) Isabella Ajalla	5.7	8.000		13.700
2nd place, silver medalist(s)	(United States) Simone Rose	6.0	7.700		13.700
3rd place, bronze medalist(s)	(Brazil) Thaís Fidélis	5.5	8.033		13.533
4	(Canada) Lia Redick	5.5	7.933		13.433
5	(Brazil) Julia Soares	5.7	7.533		13.233
6	(United States) Charleigh Bullock	5.3	7.200		12.500
7	(Argentina) Meline Mesropian	5.0	6.833		11.833
8	(Mexico) Michelle Pineda	5.2	6.633		11.833

=== Floor exercise ===
Rank	Gymnast	D Score	E Score	Pen.	Total
1st place, gold medalist(s)	(United States) Claire Pease	6.0	7.833		13.833
2nd place, silver medalist(s)	(Canada) Lia Redick	5.4	8.000		13.400
3rd place, bronze medalist(s)	(Argentina) Isabella Ajalla	5.3	7.900		13.200
4	(Brazil) Thaís Fidélis	5.3	7.866		13.166
5	(Canada) Gabrielle Black	5.3	7.833		13.133
6	(United States) Charleigh Bullock	5.4	7.600	-0.1	12.900
7	(Mexico) Michelle Pineda	5.1	7.600		12.700
8	(Brazil) Sophia Weisberg	5.2	7.366	-0.2	12.366
