= Gymnastics at the Central American and Caribbean Games =

Different gymnastics disciplines have been contested at the Central American and Caribbean Games. Artistic gymnastics has been part of the program since 1946 (except for the 1962 and 1966 editions). Rhythmic gymnastics was first introduced in 1998. Trampoline gymnastics entered the program in 2010.

== Editions ==
Sport	1926	1930	1935	1938	1946	1950	1954	1959	1962	1966	1970	1974	1978	1982	1986	1990	1993	1998	2002	2006	2010	2014	2018	2023	2026
Artistic gymnastics					X	X	X	X			X	X	X	X	X	X	X	X	X	X	X	X	X	X	X
Rhythmic gymnastics																		X	X	X	X	X	X	X	X
Trampoline																					X	X	X	X	X

== All-time medal table ==
Artistic gymnastics (1946–1959, 1970–2023)

Rank	Nation	Gold	Silver	Bronze	Total
1	Cuba (CUB)	141	119	69	329
2	Mexico (MEX)	44	53	56	153
3	Venezuela (VEN)	20	23	37	80
4	Puerto Rico (PUR)	18	16	35	69
5	Colombia (COL)	16	15	23	54
6	Dominican Republic (DOM)	3	4	6	13
7	Guatemala (GUA)	2	5	11	18
8	Panama (PAN)	1	3	5	9
9	Centro Caribe Sports (CCS)	1	0	0	1
10	Jamaica (JAM)	0	0	1	1
10	U.S. Virgin Islands (VIR)	0	0	1	1
Totals (11 entries)		246	238	244	728

Rhythmic gymnastics (1998–2023)

Rank	Nation	Gold	Silver	Bronze	Total
1	Mexico (MEX)	37	25	5	67
2	Venezuela (VEN)	6	10	19	35
3	Cuba (CUB)	5	8	5	18
4	Colombia (COL)	0	3	10	13
5	El Salvador (ESA)	0	2	2	4
6	Puerto Rico (PUR)	0	1	3	4
7	Guatemala (GUA)	0	1	1	2
8	Dominican Republic (DOM)	0	0	1	1
Totals (8 entries)		48	50	46	144

Trampoline gymnastics (2010–2023)

Rank	Nation	Gold	Silver	Bronze	Total
1	Mexico (MEX)	7	3	0	10
2	Colombia (COL)	2	4	1	7
3	Puerto Rico (PUR)	0	1	1	2
4	Cuba (CUB)	0	1	0	1
5	Venezuela (VEN)	0	0	4	4
6	Dominican Republic (DOM)	0	0	2	2
7	El Salvador (ESA)	0	0	1	1
Totals (7 entries)		9	9	9	27
