= Meline Mesropian =

Argentine artistic gymnast (born 2005)

- Nickname: Meli
- Born: June 15, 2005 (age 21) Buenos Aires, Argentina

Gymnastics career
- Country represented: Argentina
- Club: Defensores de Banfield
Medal record
Representing Argentina
Women's artistic gymnastics
Pan American Championships
Bronze medal – third place	2024 Santa Marta	Uneven bars
South American Games
Silver medal – second place	2022 Asunción	Team
South American Championships
Gold medal – first place	2025 Medellín	Uneven bars
Gold medal – first place	2026 Lima	Team
Silver medal – second place	2021 San Juan	Team
Silver medal – second place	2024 Arcaju	Team
Silver medal – second place	2025 Medellín	Team
Silver medal – second place	2026 Lima	Uneven bars
Bronze medal – third place	2025 Medellín	Balance beam

Meline Mesropian (born June 15, 2005) is an Argentine artistic gymnast. She is the 2025 South American champion on uneven bars, as well as the 2024 Pan American bronze medallist on uneven bars. Mesropian represented Argentina at the 2022 World Gymnastics Championships.

== Senior career ==
=== 2021 ===
Mesropian made her international senior debut at the 2021 South American Championships. She contributed to the Argentine team's silver-medal finish. Individually, she placed seventh in the all-around and qualified for the uneven bars and balance beam event finals, finishing fourth in both.

=== 2022 ===
At the 2022 Pan American Championships, Mesropian helped Argentina place fifth in the team final. With this result, Argentina secured a team placement at the 2022 World Championships in Liverpool. Mesropian also placed eighth in the all-around competition.

Mesropian won silver with the Argentine team at the 2022 South American Games, competing on uneven bars. She also qualified for the uneven bars final, ultimately finishing fifth.

In October, Mesropian represented Argentina at the 2022 World Championships alongside teammates Brisa Carraro, Sira Macias, Leila Martinez, and Rocio Saucedo. The Argentine team placed 20th, and individually, Mesropian placed 69th in the all-around.

=== 2023 ===
In May 2023, Mesropian competed at the 2023 Pan American Championships. Though event finals were not held, she placed sixth on floor exercise and seventh on uneven bars during the qualification round. She contributed to Argentina's fourth-place finish in the team final, which once again allowed the country to send a full team to the 2023 World Championships in Antwerp.

=== 2024 ===
At the 2024 Pan American Championships, Mesropian qualified for the uneven bars final and ultimately won the bronze medal behind Daira Lamadrid of Colombia and Sydney Turner of Canada, her first individual international medal. In addition to placing fourth with the Argentine team, she qualified for the floor final, finishing in eighth place.

Mesropian contributed to Argentina's silver-medal finish as a team at the 2024 South American Championships.

=== 2025 ===
Mesropian competed on uneven bars and balance beam at the 2025 Pan American Championships, making event finals and finishing sixth in both. Argentina finished fourth as a team behind the United States, Canada, and Brazil.

In November 2025, she took part in the South American Championships, where she won the gold medal on uneven bars ahead of Brazil's Gabriela Bouças and teammate Sira Macias. She also won the bronze medal on balance beam behind Brazilian gymnasts Gabriela Barbosa and Thaís Fidélis. Argentina took second place as a team.

=== 2026 ===
Mesropian competed at the 2026 Pan American Championships, her fifth straight appearance at the competition. She once again contributed to her country's fourth-place finish as a team, allowing Argentina to send a full team to the 2026 World Championships. Individually, she qualified for the uneven bars and balance beam finals, placing fourth and seventh, respectively.

== Competitive history ==
Competitive history of Meline Mesropian at the junior level
Year	Event	Team	AA	VT	UB	BB	FX
2018	Argentinian Championships		2nd place, silver medalist(s)			3rd place, bronze medalist(s)	2nd place, silver medalist(s)
2019
2019	Argentinian Club Championships		1st place, gold medalist(s)	1st place, gold medalist(s)		1st place, gold medalist(s)	2nd place, silver medalist(s)
2019	Flanders International Team Challenge	6	14				
2019	Argentinian Championships		1st place, gold medalist(s)	3rd place, bronze medalist(s)		1st place, gold medalist(s)	4
2019	South American Championships	1st place, gold medalist(s)	8		8		3rd place, bronze medalist(s)

Competitive history of Meline Mesropian at the senior level
Year	Event	Team	AA	VT	UB	BB	FX
2021	South American Championships	2nd place, silver medalist(s)	7		4	4	
2022
2022	Pan American Championships	5	8				
2022	South American Games	2nd place, silver medalist(s)			5		
2022	World Championships	20	69		91	101	87
2022	Argentinian Championships						
2023
2023	Pan American Championships	4	13		7		6
2023	Argentinian Championships						
2024
2024	Pan American Championships	4			3rd place, bronze medalist(s)		8
2024	South American Championships	2nd place, silver medalist(s)					
2024	Argentinian Championships				2nd place, silver medalist(s)		
2025
2025	Pan American Championships	4			6	6	
2025	Argentinian Championships		17				
2025	South American Championships	2nd place, silver medalist(s)	5		1st place, gold medalist(s)	3rd place, bronze medalist(s)	
2026
2026	Pan American Championships	4			4	7	
2026	Paris World Challenge Cup						
2026	World Championships						
