= 2021 South American Artistic Gymnastics Championships =

International artistic gymnastics competition

The 2021 South American Artistic Gymnastics Championships was held in San Juan, Argentina, from December 10 to 12, 2021. The competition was approved by the International Gymnastics Federation.

== Medalists ==
Event	Gold	Silver	Bronze
Men
Team all-around	Brazil; Gabriel Faria; Johnny Oshiro; Josué Heliodoro; Patrick Sampaio; Rankiel Neves; Yuri Guimarães	Argentina; Santiago Mayol; Daniel Villafañe; Luca Alfieri; Julian Jato; Federico Molinari; Santiago Agostinelli	Chile; Ignacio Varas; Joel Álvarez; Josué Armijo; Yosias Bustos; Agustín Lira; Juan Raffo
Individual all-around	Gabriel Faria (BRA)	Santiago Mayol (ARG)	Johnny Oshiro (BRA)
Floor exercise	Santiago Mayol (ARG)	Julian Jato (ARG)	Josué Armijo (CHI)
Pommel horse	Gabriel Faria (BRA)	Santiago Mayol (ARG)	Rankiel Neves (BRA)
Rings	Daniel Villafañe (ARG)	Federico Molinari (ARG)	Gabriel Faria (BRA)
Vault	Josué Heliodoro (BRA)	Victor Rostagno (URU)	Dilan Jiménez (COL)
Parallel bars	Julian Jato (ARG)	Gabriel Faria (BRA)	Santiago Mayol (ARG)
Horizontal bar	Patrick Sampaio (BRA)	Santiago Mayol (ARG)	Israel Chiriboga (ECU)
Women
Team all-around	Brazil; Ana Luiza Lima; Beatriz Benedetti; Beatriz Lima; Camille Fonseca; Carolyne Pedro; Júlia Soares	Argentina; Rocío Saucedo; Meline Mesropian; Abigail Magistrati; Leila Martínez; Brisa Carraro; Aylen Gasparri	Chile; Franchesca Santi; Antonia Rubio; Elisa Hofmann; Francisca Casella; Allison Reyes; Maria Catalina Pinto
Individual all-around	Júlia Soares (BRA)	Beatriz Lima (BRA) Abigail Magistrati (ARG)	—N/a
Vault	Franchesca Santi (CHI)	Ana Mendez (PER)	Alais Perea (ECU)
Uneven bars	Brisa Carraro (ARG)	Carolyne Pedro (BRA)	Júlia Soares (BRA)
Balance beam	Júlia Soares (BRA)	Alais Perea (ECU)	Ana Luiza Lima (BRA)
Floor exercise	Júlia Soares (BRA)	Abigail Magistrati (ARG)	Ana Luiza Lima (BRA)

== Participating nations ==
- Argentina
- Aruba
- Bolivia
- Brazil
- Chile
- Colombia
- Ecuador
- Peru
- Uruguay

== Medal table ==
Rank	Nation	Gold	Silver	Bronze	Total
1	Brazil (BRA)	9	3	6	18
2	Argentina (ARG)	4	9	1	14
3	Chile (CHI)	1	0	3	4
4	Ecuador (ECU)	0	1	2	3
5	Peru (PER)	0	1	0	1
5	Uruguay (URU)	0	1	0	1
7	Colombia (COL)	0	0	1	1
Totals (7 entries)		14	15	13	42
