= Christal Bezerra =

Brazilian artistic gymnast (born 2004)

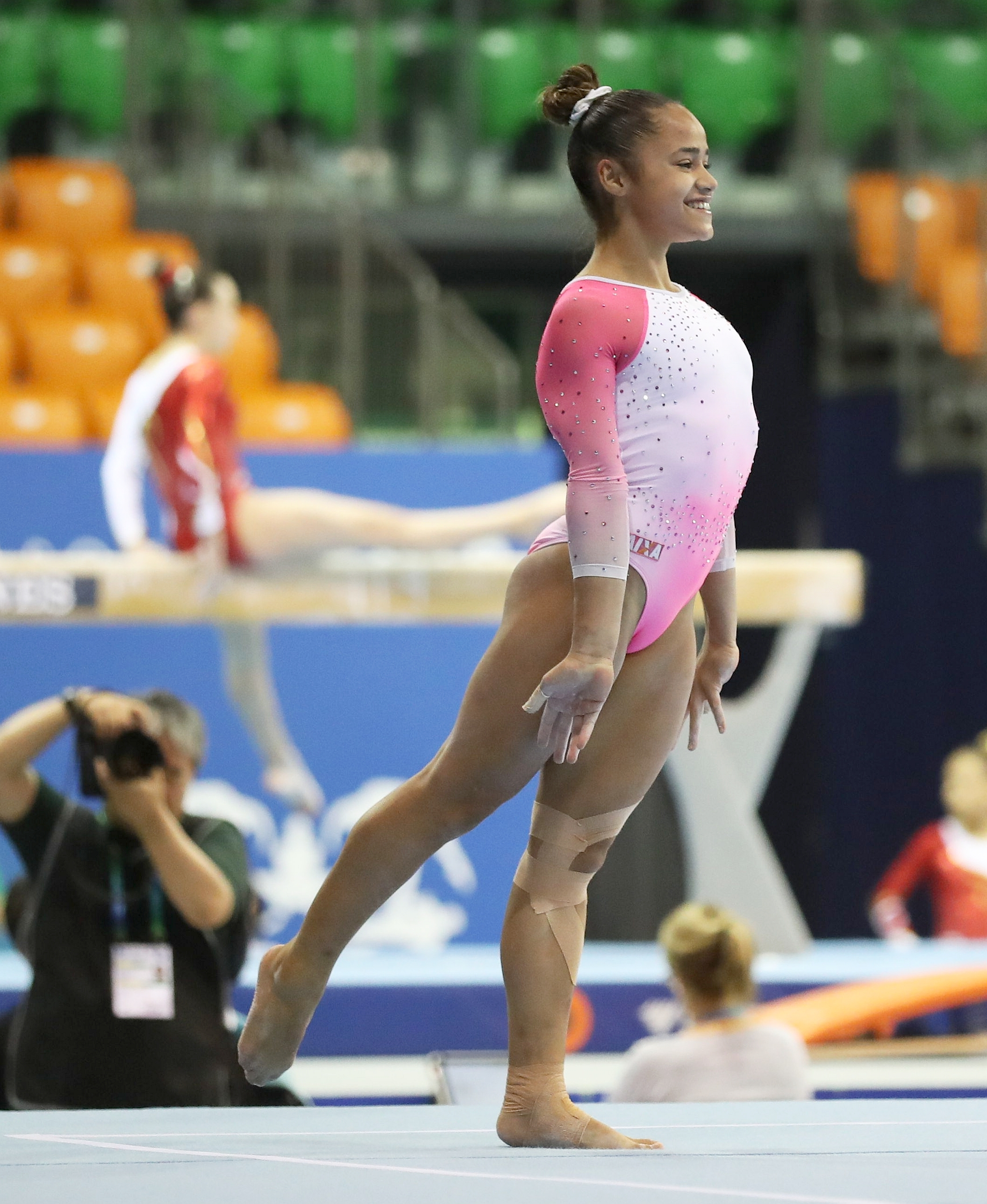
- Bezerra at the 2019 Junior World Championships

Personal information
- Full name: Christal Silva e Bezerra
- Born: 21 August 2004 (age 22) Itaquera, São Paulo, SP, Brazil

Gymnastics career
- Discipline: Women's artistic gymnastics
- Country represented: Brazil (2017–present (BRA))
- Club: Centro Olimpico de Treinamento e Pesquisa (COTP)
- Head coach: Beatriz Fragoso Estevam
Medal record
Women's artistic gymnastics
Representing Brazil
Pan American Championships
Gold medal – first place	2021 Rio de Janeiro	Team
Gold medal – first place	2022 Rio de Janeiro	Team
Silver medal – second place	2021 Rio de Janeiro	Uneven Bars
Silver medal – second place	2021 Rio de Janeiro	Floor Exercise
South American Games
Gold medal – first place	2022 Asunción	Team

Christal Silva e Bezerra (born 21 August 2004) is a Brazilian artistic gymnast. She competed at the 2019 Junior World Championships, and was part of the gold medal-winning national team at the 2021 Pan American Championships.

== Early life ==
Bezerra was born on 21 August 2004. She started gymnastics at the age of four.

== Career ==
=== Junior ===
In September 2017, Bezerra placed second in the all-around in the espoir division of the Brazilian Junior Championships, also taking the gold medals on vault and uneven bars. She was then selected to compete at the South American Junior Championships in Argentina, where she placed fifth in the all-around and took the bronze medal in the uneven bars final.

Bezerra started her 2018 season at the City of Jesolo Trophy in Italy, where she placed 35th in the all-around and contributed to the Brazilian team's seventh-place finish. In June, Bezerra competed at the Junior Pan American Championships in Buenos Aires, where the Brazilian juniors finished fourth in the team competition behind the United States, Canada and Argentina. Individually, Bezerra placed eleventh in the all-around and sixth on the uneven bars. At the South American Junior Championships in Peru, she helped Brazil win the team gold medal, and placed second in the all-around behind teammate Ana Luiza Lima. She also picked up an additional gold medal in the uneven bars final.

In June 2019, Bezerra represented Brazil at the inaugural Junior World Championships in Győr alongside Ana Luiza Lima and Júlia Soares. Together they finished seventh in the team competition. Individually, Bezerra placed twentieth in the all-around with a score of 50.066.

=== Senior ===
Bezerra became age-eligible for senior competition in 2020, but did not compete that year due to the impacts of the COVID-19 pandemic. She made her senior international debut in June 2021 at the Pan American Championships in Rio de Janeiro. There, the Brazilian team of Bezerra, Ana Luiza Lima, Júlia Soares, Rebeca Andrade and Lorrane Oliveira won the gold medal ahead of Mexico and Argentina. Bezerra also picked up two individual silver medals on the uneven bars and the floor exercise, and placed fourth on the balance beam.

Later in 2021, Bezerra competed at the Brazilian Championships, where she won the gold medals on vault and floor exercise, and placed third in the all-around behind Andrade and Oliveira.

In July 2022, Bezerra was named to the Brazilian team for the 2022 Pan American Championships alongside Andrade, Oliveira, Soares, Carolyne Pedro and Flávia Saraiva. Bezerra competed in the qualification round, which also determined the all-around and apparatus results. She helped Brazil qualify to the team final in first place and finished seventh on vault. She was replaced by Oliveira for the team final, in which the Brazilian team went on to win the gold medal ahead of the United States and Canada.

== Competitive history ==
Year	Event	Team	AA	VT	UB	BB	FX
Junior
2017	Brazilian Junior Championships (espoir)		2nd place, silver medalist(s)	1st place, gold medalist(s)	1st place, gold medalist(s)		4
2017	South American Junior Championships	1st place, gold medalist(s)	5		3rd place, bronze medalist(s)		
2018	City of Jesolo Trophy	7	35				
2018	Junior Pan American Championships	4	11		6		
2018	Brazilian Championships		3rd place, bronze medalist(s)	1st place, gold medalist(s)	1st place, gold medalist(s)		
2018	Junior South American Championships	1st place, gold medalist(s)	2nd place, silver medalist(s)	4	1st place, gold medalist(s)		
2018	Brazilian Junior Championships		2nd place, silver medalist(s)	1st place, gold medalist(s)	1st place, gold medalist(s)	2nd place, silver medalist(s)	1st place, gold medalist(s)
2019	WOGA Classic		11				
2019	Brazilian Event Championships				6		
2019	Junior World Championships	7	20				
Senior
2021
2021	Pan American Championships	1st place, gold medalist(s)			2nd place, silver medalist(s)	4	2nd place, silver medalist(s)
2021	Brazilian Championships	3rd place, bronze medalist(s)	3rd place, bronze medalist(s)	1st place, gold medalist(s)	8	5	3rd place, bronze medalist(s)
2022
2022	Pan American Championships	(gold) (Note: Bezerra only competed in the qualification round.)		7			
2022	Brazilian Championships	3rd place, bronze medalist(s)	6	1st place, gold medalist(s)	5	15	5
2022	South American Games	1st place, gold medalist(s)	8	4			
2023	Brazil Trophy			2nd place, silver medalist(s)	8	5	
2023	Pan American Championships	5					
