= Gymnastics at the 2022 South American Games =

Gymnastics competitions at the 2022 South American Games

- Venue: Pabellón de Gimnasia del SND
- Dates: October 5−13
- Nations: 11

Gymnastics competitions at the 2022 South American Games in Asunción, Paraguay were held between October 5 and 13, 2022 at the Pabellón de Gimnasia del SND.

== Schedule ==
The competition schedule is as follows:

P	Preliminary	F	Final

Artistic gymnastics
Date Event	Wed 5	Thu 6	Fri 7	Sat 8
Men's team all-around	F			
Men's individual all-around	F			
Men's floor exercise			F	
Men's pommel horse			F	
Men's rings			F	
Men's vault				F
Men's parallel bars				F
Men's Horizontal bar				F
Women's team all-around		F		
Women's individual all-around		F		
Women's vault			F	
Women's uneven bars			F	
Women's balance beam				F
Women's floor exercise				F

Rhythmic gymnastics
Date Event	Tue 11	Wed 12	Thu 13
Individual all-around	P	P	F
Ball	F		
Clubs		F	
Hoop	F		
Ribbon		F	
Group all-around	P	F	
5 hoops	P		F
3 ribbons + 2 balls		P	F

Trampoline gymnastics
Date Event	Wed 12	Thu 13
Men's individual	P	F
Women's individual	P	F

== Medal summary ==
=== Medal table ===
* Host nation (Paraguay)

Rank	Nation	Gold	Silver	Bronze	Total
1	Brazil (BRA)	19	10	3	32
2	Colombia (COL)	3	2	8	13
3	Argentina (ARG)	1	7	7	15
4	Chile (CHI)	1	1	3	5
5	Venezuela (VEN)	0	3	1	4
6	Panama (PAN)	0	1	1	2
7	Peru (PER)	0	0	1	1
Totals (7 entries)		24	24	24	72

=== Medalists ===
==== Artistic gymnastics ====
===== Men =====
Event	Gold	Silver	Bronze
Team all-around	Brazil; Francisco Barretto Júnior; Lucas Bitencourt; Yuri Guimarães; Arthur Mariano; Diogo Soares; Caio Souza	Argentina; Santiago Agostinelli; Luca Alfieri; Ivo Chiapponi; Julián Jato; Santiago Mayol; Daniel Villafañe	Colombia; Kristopher Bohórquez; Jossimar Calvo; Dilan Jiménez; Andrés Martínez; José Martínez; Sergio Vargas
Individual all-around	Caio Souza; Brazil	Lucas Bitencourt; Brazil	Jossimar Calvo; Colombia
Floor exercise	Arthur Mariano; Brazil	Jossimar Calvo; Colombia	Santiago Agostinelli; Argentina
Pommel horse	Andrés Martínez; Colombia	Santiago Mayol; Argentina	Adickxon Trejo; Venezuela
Rings	Daniel Villafañe; Argentina	Kristopher Bohórquez; Colombia	Dilan Jiménez; Colombia
Vault	Caio Souza; Brazil	Daniel Villafañe; Argentina	Josué Armijo; Chile
Parallel bars	Jossimar Calvo; Colombia	Caio Souza; Brazil	Dilan Jiménez; Colombia
Horizontal bar	Caio Souza; Brazil	Joel Álvarez; Chile	Diogo Soares; Brazil

===== Women =====
Event	Gold	Silver	Bronze
Team all-around	Brazil; Christal Bezerra; Thaís Fidélis; Beatriz Lima; Luisa Maia; Carolyne Pedro; Júlia Soares	Argentina; Brisa Carraro; Sira Macias; Abigail Magistrati; Leila Martínez; Meline Mesropian; Rocío Saucedo	Colombia; Ginna Escobar; Daira Lamadrid; Juliana Ochoa; Yiseth Valenzuela; María José Villegas
Individual all-around	Júlia Soares; Brazil	Carolyne Pedro; Brazil	Brisa Carraro; Argentina
Vault	Makarena Pinto; Chile	Hillary Heron; Panama	Franchesca Santi; Chile
Uneven bars	Carolyne Pedro; Brazil	Brisa Carraro; Argentina	Ginna Escobar; Colombia
Balance beam	Júlia Soares; Brazil	Brisa Carraro; Argentina	Ana Mendez; Peru
Floor exercise	Júlia Soares; Brazil	Carolyne Pedro; Brazil	Hillary Heron; Panama

==== Rhythmic gymnastics ====
Event	Gold	Silver	Bronze
Individual all-around	Bárbara Domingos; Brazil	Geovanna Santos; Brazil	Sol Fainberg; Argentina
Ball	Bárbara Domingos; Brazil	Geovanna Santos; Brazil	Sol Fainberg; Argentina
Clubs	Bárbara Domingos; Brazil	Sol Fainberg; Argentina	Geovanna Santos; Brazil
Hoop	Geovanna Santos; Brazil	Bárbara Domingos; Brazil	Sol Fainberg; Argentina
Ribbon	Bárbara Domingos; Brazil	Geovanna Santos; Brazil	Celeste D'Arcángelo; Argentina
Group all-around	Brazil; Victoria Borges; Gabriella Castilho; Bárbara Galvão; Julia Kurunczi; Sofia Pereira; Beatriz da Silva	Venezuela; María Domínguez; Waleska Ojeda; Roselyn Palencia; Dahilin Parra; Juliette Quiróz; Yelbery Rodríguez	Argentina; Milagros Centeno; Evangelina Cordier; Karema Jara; Agustina Luján; Ludmila Miravet; Macarena Rodríguez
5 hoops	Brazil; Victoria Borges; Gabriella Castilho; Bárbara Galvão; Julia Kurunczi; Sofia Pereira; Beatriz da Silva	Venezuela; María Domínguez; Waleska Ojeda; Roselyn Palencia; Dahilin Parra; Juliette Quiróz; Yelbery Rodríguez	Chile; Valentina Cuello; Martina Inostroza; Isabel Lozano; Josefina Romero; Anneli Sepúlveda
3 ribbons + 2 balls	Brazil; Victoria Borges; Gabriella Castilho; Bárbara Galvão; Julia Kurunczi; Sofia Pereira; Beatriz da Silva	Venezuela; María Domínguez; Waleska Ojeda; Roselyn Palencia; Dahilin Parra; Juliette Quiróz; Yelbery Rodríguez	Colombia; Lorena Duarte; Angelica Guerrero; Natalia Jiménez; Adriana Mantilla; Nicol Mora; Kizzy Rivas

==== Trampoline gymnastics ====
Event	Gold	Silver	Bronze
Men's individual	Ángel Hernández; Colombia	Rayan Dutra; Brazil	Lucas Tobias; Brazil
Women's individual	Camilla Gomes; Brazil	Alice Gomes; Brazil	Katish Hernández; Colombia

== Participating nations ==
Eleven nations participated in gymnastics events at the 2022 South American Games.

- Argentina
- Bolivia
- Brazil
- Chile
- Colombia
- Ecuador
- Panama
- Paraguay
- Peru
- Uruguay
- Venezuela

== Results ==
=== Men's artistic team all-around ===
Rank	Team	Floor (gymnastics)	Pommel horse	Rings (gymnastics)	Vault (gymnastics)	Parallel bars	Horizontal bar	Total
1st place, gold medalist(s)	Brazil	51.100 (1)	48.400 (1)	53.850 (1)	55.600 (1)	53.500 (1)	54.250 (1)	320.700
1st place, gold medalist(s)	Caio Souza	13.250	12.600	14.250	14.550	13.950	14.400	320.700
1st place, gold medalist(s)	Lucas Bitencourt	13.250	12.300	13.650	13.950	13.600	12.400	320.700
1st place, gold medalist(s)	Diogo Soares	13.550	11.200	12.800	13.100	13.200	14.00	320.700
1st place, gold medalist(s)	Arthur Mariano	14.250	10.700		14.00	12.750	13.250	320.700
1st place, gold medalist(s)	Francisco Barretto Júnior		12.300	13.100		11.550	12.600	320.700
1st place, gold medalist(s)	Yuri Guimarães	14.050		12.850	12.950			320.700
2nd place, silver medalist(s)	Argentina	52.800 (2)	47.800 (3)	52.550 (3)	54.650 (3)	51.100 (3)	51.300 (2)	310.200
2nd place, silver medalist(s)	Julián Jato	13.200	12.300	13.100	13.450	13.450	13.000	310.200
2nd place, silver medalist(s)	Santiago Mayol	12.500	12.650	12.600	13.450	13.000	13.000	310.200
2nd place, silver medalist(s)	Santiago Agostinelli	13.350		12.700	13.650	11.850	12.350	310.200
2nd place, silver medalist(s)	Daniel Villafañe	13.200	0.000	14.150	14.100	12.650		310.200
2nd place, silver medalist(s)	Ivo Chiapponi	13.050	11.250	13.200		10.550		310.200
2nd place, silver medalist(s)	Luca Alfieri		11.600		12.000	12.950		310.200
3rd place, bronze medalist(s)	Colombia	51.650 (6)	46.150 (5)	53.550 (2)	54.750 (2)	52.900 (2)	50.650 (2)	309.650
3rd place, bronze medalist(s)	Jossimar Calvo	13.400	12.150	13.050	13.550	13.950	12.500	309.650
3rd place, bronze medalist(s)	Andrés Martínez	12.800	12.500	12.900	13.200	12.150	13.550	309.650
3rd place, bronze medalist(s)	Dilan Jiménez	13.250	8.500	13.400	14.250	13.650	11.200	309.650
3rd place, bronze medalist(s)	Sergio Vargas	12.200	10.450		13.750	12.800	12.000	309.650
3rd place, bronze medalist(s)	José Martínez	11.800	11.050	12.750	12.800		12.600	309.650
3rd place, bronze medalist(s)	Kristopher Bohórquez			14.200		12.500		309.650
4	Peru	52.200 (5=)	47.850 (3)	50.500 (4)	54.500 (4)	49.150 (4)	50.100 (4)	304.300
4	Edward Gonzales	13.600	11.950	12.600	13.550	13.000	12.400	304.300
4	Daniel Agüero	13.500	11.600	12.450	14.100	12.050	12.400	304.300
4	Edward Alarcón	10.200	12.600	13.050	13.700	12.200	12.650	304.300
4	Luis Pizarro	12.900	11.700		13.150	11.900		304.300
4	Arian Prado	12.200	11.400	12.400			12.400	304.300
4	Mauricio Gallegos			12.300			12.650	304.300
5	Ecuador	52.200 (5=)	46.800 (5)	50.100 (5)	53.850 (6)	48.300 (6)	49.650 (6)	300.900
5	Israel Chiriboga	13.000	12.500	11.750	13.300	12.500	12.550	300.900
5	César López	13.100	11.400	12.900	13.300	12.250	12.300	300.900
5	Pablo Calvache	12.850	11.850	12.050	13.600	12.150	12.650	300.900
5	Johnny Valencia	13.100	11.050	12.450	12.750	11.400	12.150	300.900
5	Joan Pilay	13.000	8.760	12.700	13.650	10.950	11.300	300.900
6	Chile	52.550 (4)	44.550 (6)	49.500 (6)	54.050 (5)	48.900 (6)	50.050 (6)	299.600
6	Joel Álvarez	13.050	10.650	13.050	13.700	13.00	13.200	299.600
6	Luciano Letelier	13.050	11.750	12.450	13.700	12.350	13.100	299.600
6	Ignacio Varas	13.300	11.150	12.250	12.950	11.800	11.850	299.600
6	Josue Armijo	13.150	10.750	11.750	13.700	11.750	11.650	299.600
6	Rafael Miranda	11.550	10.900	11.300	12.250	10.900	11.900	299.600
7	Bolivia	42.700 (7)	27.600 (7)	40.900 (7)	49.100 (7)	41.900 (7)	41.850 (7)	244.050
7	Fabián Peña	9.550	9.250	10.550	12.050	11.250	9.750	244.050
7	Daniel Roth	11.000	6.450	10.750	12.300	10.100	10.950	244.050
7	Leonardo Mamani	10.950	5.350	9.700	12.850	10.850	10.650	244.050
7	Sergio Moyano	11.200	6.550	9.900	11.900	9.700	10.500	244.050

=== Men's artistic individual all-around ===
Rank	Gymnast	Nation	Floor (gymnastics)	Pommel horse	Rings (gymnastics)	Vault (gymnastics)	Parallel bars	Horizontal bar	Total
1st place, gold medalist(s)	Caio Souza	Brazil	13.250	12.600 Q	14.250 Q	14.550 Q	13.950 Q	14.400 Q	83.000
2nd place, silver medalist(s)	Lucas Bitencourt	Brazil	13.250	12.300 Q	13.650 Q	13.950	13.600 Q	12.400	79.150
3rd place, bronze medalist(s)	Jossimar Calvo	Colombia	13.400 Q	12.150	13.050	13.550	13.950 Q	12.500	78.600
4	Julián Jato	Argentina	13.200	12.300 Q	13.100 Q	13.450	13.450 Q	13.000 Q	78.500
5	Diogo Soares	Brazil	13.550	11.200	12.800	13.100	13.200	14.000 Q	77.850
6	Santiago Mayol	Argentina	12.500	12.650 Q	12.600	13.450	13.000 Q	13.000 Q	77.200
7	Andrés Martínez	Colombia	12.800	12.500 Q	12.900	13.200	12.150	13.550 Q	77.100
8	Edward Gonzales	Peru	13.600 Q	11.950	12.600	13.550 Q	13.000 Q	12.400	77.100
9	Joel Álvarez	Chile	13.050	10.650	13.050 Q	13.700	13.000	13.200 Q	76.650
10	Luciano Letelier	Chile	13.050	11.750	12.450	13.700	12.350	13.100 Q	76.400
11	Daniel Agüero	Peru	13.500 Q	11.600	12.450	14.100 Q	12.050	12.400	76.100
12	Israel Chiriboga	Ecuador	13.000	12.500 Q	11.750	13.300	12.500	12.550	75.600
13	César López	Ecuador	13.100	11.400	12.900	13.300	12.250	12.300	75.250
14	Pablo Calvache	Ecuador	12.850	11.850	12.050	13.600 Q	12.150	12.650	75.150
15	Edward Alarcón	Peru	10.200	12.600 Q	13.050 Q	13.700	12.200	12.650	74.400
16	Dilan Jiménez	Colombia	13.250	8.500	13.400 Q	14.250	13.650 Q	11.200	74.250
17	Ignacio Varas	Chile	13.300	11.150	12.250	12.950 Q	11.800	11.850	73.300
18	Johnny Valencia	Ecuador	13.100	11.050	12.450	12.750	11.400	12.150	72.900
19	Josue Armijo	Chile	13.150	10.750	11.750	13.700 Q	11.750	11.650	72.750
20	Edward Rolin	Venezuela	10.850	10.800	12.250	12.500	13.100 Q	12.800 Q	72.300
21	Yefferson Yeguez	Venezuela	12.350	12.300	11.450	12.850	11.750	11.200	71.900
22	Joan Pilay	Ecuador	13.000	8.750	12.700	13.650	10.950	11.300	70.350
23	Victor Rostagno	Uruguay	13.450 Q	5.750	12.850	14.150	11.600	11.150	68.950
24	Rafael Miranda	Chile	11.550	10.900	11.300	12.250	10.900	11.500	68.800
25	Arthur Mariano	Brazil	14.250 Q	10.700		14.00	12.750	13.250	64.950
26	Santiago Agostinelli	Argentina	13.350 Q		12.700	13.650	11.850	12.350	63.900
27	Fabián Peña	Bolivia	9.550	9.250	10.550	12.050	11.250	9.740	62.400
28	Daniel Roth	Bolivia	11.000	6.450	10.750	12.300	10.100	10.950	61.550
29	Sergio Vargas	Colombia	12.200	10.450		13.750	12.800	12.000	61.200
30	José Martínez	Colombia	11.800	11.050	12.750	12.800		12.600	61.000
31	Leonardo Mamani	Bolivia	10.950	5.350	9.700	12.850	10.850	10.650	60.350
32	Sergio Moyano	Bolivia	11.200	6.550	9.900	11.900	9.700	10.500	59.750
33	Daniel Villafañe	Argentina	13.200	0.000	14.150 Q	14.100 Q	12.650		54.100
34	Luis Pizarro	Peru	12.900	11.700		13.150	11.900		49.650
35	Francisco Barretto Júnior	Brazil		12.300	13.100		11.550	12.600	49.550
36	Arian Prado	Peru	12.200	11.400	12.400			12.400	48.400
37	Ivo Chiapponi	Argentina	13.050	11.250	0.000	13.200		10.550	48.050
38	Adickxson Trejo	Venezuela	13.650 Q	12.700 Q		13.500			39.850
39	Yuri Guimarães	Brazil	14.050 Q		12.850	12.950 Q			39.850
40	Luca Alfieri	Argentina		11.600			12.000	12.950	36.550
41	Kristopher Bohórquez	Colombia			14.200 Q		12.500		26.700
42	Mauricio Gallegos	Peru			12.300			12.650	24.950
43	Fabrizio Begrete	Paraguay	6.700			11.150			17.850
44	Luis Melgarejo	Paraguay	10.950						10.950
45	Juan José Delvalle	Paraguay	5.300						5.300

=== Men's floor exercise ===
Rank	Gymnast	Nation	D Score	E Score	Pen.	Total		
Rank	Gymnast	Nation	1st place, gold medalist(s)	Arthur Mariano	Brazil	5.500	8.475	13.975
2nd place, silver medalist(s)	Jossimar Calvo	Colombia	5.600	7.950		13.550		
3rd place, bronze medalist(s)	Santiago Agostinelli	Argentina	5.100	8.250		13.350		
4	Victor Rostagno	Uruguay	5.400	7.850		13.250		
5	Yuri Guimarães	Brazil	5.900	7.725	0.4	13.225		
6	Edward Gonzales	Peru	5.000	7.925		12.925		
7	Daniel Agüero	Peru	5.200	7.550		12.750		
8	Adickxon Trejo	Venezuela	4.900	6.475	0.3	11.075		

=== Men's pommel horse ===
Rank	Gymnast	Nation	D Score	E Score	Pen.	Total		
Rank	Gymnast	Nation	1st place, gold medalist(s)	Andrés Martínez	Colombia	5.200	7.975	13.175
2nd place, silver medalist(s)	Santiago Mayol	Argentina	5.400	7.625		13.025		
3rd place, bronze medalist(s)	Adickxon Trejo	Venezuela	5.100	7.700		12.800		
4	Edward Alarcón	Peru	4.900	7.700		12.600		
5	Lucas Bitencourt	Brazil	4.900	7.400		12.300		
6	Israel Chiriboga	Ecuador	4.600	7.700		12.300		
7	Julián Jato	Argentina	4.200	8.025		12.225		
8	Caio Souza	Brazil	5.100	7.125		12.225		

=== Men's rings ===
Rank	Gymnast	Nation	D Score	E Score	Pen.	Total		
Rank	Gymnast	Nation	1st place, gold medalist(s)	Daniel Villafañe	Argentina	5.800	8.100	13.900
2nd place, silver medalist(s)	Kristopher Bohórquez	Colombia	5.600	8.225		13.825		
3rd place, bronze medalist(s)	Dilan Jiménez	Colombia	5.300	8.150		13.450		
4	Caio Souza	Brazil	6.200	6.950		13.150		
5	Joel Álvarez	Chile	4.500	8.275		12.775		
6	Julián Jato	Argentina	4.800	7.950		12.750		
7	Lucas Bitencourt	Brazil	5.100	7.650		12.750		
8	Edward Alarcón	Peru	5.000	6.625		11.625		

=== Men's vault ===
Rank	Gymnast	Nation	Vault 1	Pen.	Total			
Rank	Gymnast	Nation	1st place, gold medalist(s)	Caio Souza	Brazil	14.225	0.1	14.475
2nd place, silver medalist(s)	Daniel Villafañe	Argentina	13.725		13.938			
3rd place, bronze medalist(s)	Josue Armijo	Chile	13.825		13.825			
4	Edward Gonzales	Peru	13.725		13.725			
5	Yuri Guimarães	Brazil	13.275		13.713			
6	Daniel Agüero	Peru	12.700		13.075			
7	Pablo Calvache	Ecuador	13.575	0.3	13.075			
8	Ignacio Varas	Chile	12.575	0.3	12.823			

=== Men's parallel bars ===
Rank	Gymnast	Nation	D Score	E Score	Pen.	Total		
Rank	Gymnast	Nation	1st place, gold medalist(s)	Jossimar Calvo	Colombia	6.700	7.825	14.525
2nd place, silver medalist(s)	Caio Souza	Brazil	6.000	8.300		14.300		
3rd place, bronze medalist(s)	Dilan Jiménez	Colombia	5.900	8.075		13.975		
4	Julián Jato	Argentina	5.300	8.275		13.575		
5	Lucas Bitencourt	Brazil	5.200	8.075		13.275		
6	Edward Rolin	Venezuela	5.400	7.800		13.200		
7	Santiago Mayol	Argentina	5.100	8.025		13.125		
8	Edward Gozales	Peru	4.900	7.025		11.925		

=== Men's horizontal bar ===
Rank	Gymnast	Nation	D Score	E Score	Pen.	Total		
Rank	Gymnast	Nation	1st place, gold medalist(s)	Caio Souza	Brazil	6.300	7.850	14.150
2nd place, silver medalist(s)	Joel Álvarez	Chile	5.000	8.325		13.325		
3rd place, bronze medalist(s)	Diogo Soares	Brazil	5.500	7.775		13.275		
4	Santiago Mayol	Argentina	4.600	8.000		12.600		
5	Andrés Martínez	Colombia	5.000	7.075		12.075		
6	Luciano Letelier	Chile	4.500	7.500		12.000		
7	Edward Rolin	Venezuela	4.400	6.975		11.375		
8	Julián Jato	Argentina	4.300	6.200		10.500		

=== Women's artistic team all-around ===
Rank	Team	Vault (gymnastics)	Uneven bars	Balance beam	Floor (gymnastics)	Total
1st place, gold medalist(s)	Brazil	52.033 (1)	50.500 (1)	52.533 (1)	51.233 (1)	206.299
1st place, gold medalist(s)	Júlia Soares	12.733	12.667	14.033	13.233	206.299
1st place, gold medalist(s)	Carolyne Pedro	13.000	13.133	12.700	13.000	206.299
1st place, gold medalist(s)	Luisa Maia	12.733	12.033	12.967	12.467	206.299
1st place, gold medalist(s)	Christal Bezerra	13.100	11.667	12.500	11.533	206.299
1st place, gold medalist(s)	Beatriz Lima	13.200			12.533	206.299
1st place, gold medalist(s)	Thaís Fidélis		12.667	12.833		206.299
2nd place, silver medalist(s)	Argentina	50.633 (2)	50.167 (2)	47.467 (2)	51.033 (2)	199.300
2nd place, silver medalist(s)	Brisa Carraro	12.600	13.067	11.667	13.033	199.300
2nd place, silver medalist(s)	Rocío Saucedo	12.800	11.800	11.433	12.867	199.300
2nd place, silver medalist(s)	Sira Macías	12.600	12.400	11.600	12.300	199.300
2nd place, silver medalist(s)	Leila Martínez	12.400	11.733	11.033	11.800	199.300
2nd place, silver medalist(s)	Abigail Magistrati	12.613		12.767	12.833	199.300
2nd place, silver medalist(s)	Meline Mesropian		12.900			199.300
3rd place, bronze medalist(s)	Colombia	49.500 (4)	46.733 (3)	49.401 (3)	45.033 (5)	190.667
3rd place, bronze medalist(s)	Ginna Escobar	12.633	13.000	11.967	11.133	190.667
3rd place, bronze medalist(s)	Juliana Ochoa	12.433	11.933	12.267	11.700	190.667
3rd place, bronze medalist(s)	Yiseth Valenzuela	12.667	11.600	12.600	11.100	190.667
3rd place, bronze medalist(s)	María José Villegas	11.767	10.200	10.533	11.100	190.667
3rd place, bronze medalist(s)	Daira Lamadrid	10.700	8.833	12.567	10.567	190.667
4	Chile	50.534 (3)	46.167 (4)	44.267 (4)	48.966 (3)	189.934
4	Makarena Pinto	12.900	11.800	11.300	12.300	189.934
4	Franchesca Santi	13.767	10.667	11.067	12.633	189.934
4	Sofía Casella	12.400	11.767	10.567	11.500	189.934
4	Tamara Ampuero	11.467	8.733	9.767	11.333	189.934
4	Bárbara Achondo		11.933	11.333	12.533	189.934
5	Panamá	49.333 (5)	46.401 (5)	42.433 (5)	45.467 (4)	183.634
5	Karla Navas	12.867	12.467	11.800	11.767	183.634
5	Hillary Heron	12.833	11.667	10.733	12.067	183.634
5	Valentina Brostella	12.133	11.500	9.800	10.400	183.634
5	Lucía Paulino	11.500	8.933	10.100	11.000	183.634
5	Victoria Castro		10.767	7.133	10.633	183.634
6	Peru	46.367 (6)	32.467 (6)	31.334 (6)	33.200 (6)	143.368
6	Ana Karina Mendez	11.233	12.767	12.200	12.033	143.368
6	Annia Teran	11.467	9.400	8.467	10.767	143.368
6	Fabiana Cuneo	11.767		10.667	10.400	143.368
6	Ana Ximena Rengifo	11.900	10.300			143.368

=== Women's artistic individual all-around ===
Rank	Gymnast	Nation	Vault (gymnastics)	Uneven bars	Balance beam	Floor (gymnastics)	Total
1st place, gold medalist(s)	Júlia Soares	Brazil	12.733	12.667	14.033 Q	13.233 Q	52.666
2nd place, silver medalist(s)	Carolyne Pedro	Brazil	13.000	13.133 Q	12.700	13.000 Q	51.833
3rd place, bronze medalist(s)	Brisa Carraro	Argentina	12.600	13.067 Q	11.667 Q	13.033 Q	50.367
4	Luisa Maia	Brazil	12.733	12.033	12.967 Q	12.467	50.200
5	Karla Navas	Panama	12.867 Q	12.467 Q	11.800 Q	11.767	48.901
6	Sira Macías	Argentina	12.600	12.400	11.600	12.300	48.900
7	Rocío Saucedo	Argentina	12.800	11.800	11.433	12.867 Q	48.900
8	Christal Bezerra	Brazil	13.100 Q	11.667	12.500	11.533	48.800
9	Ginna Escobar	Colombia	12.633 Q	13.000 Q	11.967	11.133	48.733
10	Juliana Ochoa	Colombia	12.433	11.933 Q	12.267	11.700	48.333
11	Makarena Pinto	Chile	12.900 Q	11.800	11.300	12.300	48.300
12	Ana Karina Mendez	Peru	11.233	12.767 Q	12.200 Q	12.033	48.233
13	Franchesca Santi	Chile	13.767 Q	10.667	11.067	12.633 Q	48.134
14	Yiseth Valenzuela	Colombia	12.667	11.600	12.600 Q	11.100	47.967
15	Alais Perea	Ecuador	12.733	11.733	11.200	12.189 Q	47.855
16	Hillary Heron	Panama	12.833 Q	11.667	10.733	12.067 Q	47.300
17	Leila Martínez	Argentina	12.400	11.733	11.033	11.800	46.966
18	Sofía Casella	Chile	12.400	11.767	10.567	11.500	46.234
19	Sol Acosta	Paraguay	12.700	10.933	10.667	11.433	45.733
20	Valeria Arraiz	Venezuela	12.100	10.533	11.433	10.733	44.799
21	Ashley Bohórquez	Ecuador	12.600	10.367	9.567	11.967	44.501
22	Valentina Brostella	Panama	12.133	11.500	9.800	10.400	43.833
23	Diana Vasquez	Bolivia	12.967 Q	9.867	9.933	10.900	43.667
24	María José Villegas	Colombia	11.767	10.200	10.533	11.100	43.600
25	Getsemary Martínez	Venezuela	11.300	9.800	10.300	11.300	42.700
26	Daira Lamadrid	Colombia	10.700	8.833	12.567 Q	10.567	42.667
27	Lucía Paulino	Panama	11.500	8.933	10.100	11.000	41.533
28	Kiara Delgado	Uruguay	11.567	9.600	10.233	9.967	41.367
29	Tamara Ampuero	Chile	11.467	8.733	9.767	11.333	41.300
30	Luciana Unzueta	Bolivia	11.567	9.833	8.967	9.767	40.134
31	Annia Teran	Peru	11.467	9.400	8.467	10.767	40.101
32	Abigail Magistrati	Argentina	12.613		12.767 Q	12.833	38.233
33	Bárbara Achondo	Chile		11.933	11.333	12.533 Q	35.799
34	Ariana Aranibar	Bolivia	10.267	7.867	7.600	9.333	35.067
35	Fabiana Cuneo	Peru	11.767		10.667	10.400	32.834
36	Victoria Castro	Panama		10.767	7.133	10.633	28.533
37	Beatriz Lima	Brazil	13.200 Q			12.533	25.733
38	Thaís Fidélis	Brazil		12.667 Q	12.833		25.500
39	Ana Ximena Rengifo	Peru	11.900	10.300			22.200
40	Sol Castellano	Paraguay	10.700			8.667	19.367
41	Paila Colman	Paraguay	10.633			8.167	18.800
42	Meline Mesropian	Argentina		12.900 Q			12.900

=== Women's vault ===
Rank	Gymnast	Nation	Vault 1				Vault 2				Total
Rank	Gymnast	Nation	D Score	E Score	Pen.	Score 1	D Score	E Score	Pen.	Score 2	Total
1st place, gold medalist(s)	Makarena Pinto	Chile	4.400	8.633		13.033	4.600	8.267	0.1	12.767	12.900
2nd place, silver medalist(s)	Hillary Heron	Panama	5.000	8.400		13.400	4.000	8.600	0.3	12.300	12.850
3rd place, bronze medalist(s)	Franchesca Santi	Chile	5.000	7.567	0.3	12.267	4.400	8.667		13.067	12.667
4	Christal Bezerra	Brazil	4.200	8.633		12.833	3.600	8.700		12.300	12.567
5	Beatriz Lima	Brazil	4.200	9.000		13.200	3.400	8.567	0.1	11.867	12.534
6	Ginna Escobar	Colombia	4.200	8.767		13.367	3.800	7.533	0.1	11.233	12.300
7	Karla Navas	Panama	4.600	8.767		13.367	3.800	7.533	0.1	11.233	12.300
8	Diana Vasquez	Bolivia	4.200	8.633		12.833	3.600	7.733		11.333	12.083

=== Women's uneven bars ===
Rank	Gymnast	Nation	D Score	E Score	Pen.	Total		
Rank	Gymnast	Nation	1st place, gold medalist(s)	Carolyne Pedro	Brazil	5.200	7.467	12.667
2nd place, silver medalist(s)	Brisa Carraro	Argentina	4.800	7.800		12.600		
3rd place, bronze medalist(s)	Ginna Escobar	Colombia	4.900	7.600		12.500		
4	Karla Navas	Panama	4.900	7.300		12.200		
5	Meline Mesropian	Argentina	4.600	6.833		11.433		
6	Ana Karina Mendez	Peru	4.500	6.900		11.400		
7	Thaís Fidélis	Brazil	3.500	6.733		10.233		
8	Juliana Ochoa	Colombia	4.000	5.433		9.433		

=== Women's balance beam ===
Rank	Gymnast	Nation	D Score	E Score	Pen.	Total			
Rank	Gymnast	Nation	1st place, gold medalist(s)	Júlia Soares	Brazil	5.400	7.667	0.1	12.867
2nd place, silver medalist(s)	Brisa Carraro	Argentina	4.300	8.167		12.467			
3rd place, bronze medalist(s)	Ana Karina Mendez	Peru	5.000	7.167	0.1	12.067			
4	Karla Navas	Panama	4.500	7.333		11.833			
5	Abigail Magistrati	Argentina	4.900	6.633		11.533			
6	Yiseth Valenzuela	Colombia	4.600	6.867		11.467			
7	Luisa Maia	Brazil	4.800	6.633		11.433			
8	Daira Lamadrid	Colombia	4.600	6.167	0.1	10.667			

=== Women's floor exercise ===
Rank	Gymnast	Nation	D Score	E Score	Pen.	Total		
Rank	Gymnast	Nation	1st place, gold medalist(s)	Júlia Soares	Brazil	5.500	8.200	13.700
2nd place, silver medalist(s)	Carolyne Pedro	Brazil	5.100	7.967		13.067		
3rd place, bronze medalist(s)	Hillary Heron	Panama	5.000	7.967		12.967		
4	Bárbara Achondo	Chile	4.500	7.967		12.467		
5	Franchesca Santi	Chile	4.800	7.733	0.1	12.433		
6	Brisa Carraro	Argentina	4.400	7.933		12.333		
7	Alais Perea	Ecuador	4.400	7.833		12.233		
8	Rocío Saucedo	Argentina	5.100	7.367	0.3	12.167		

=== Women's rhythmic individual all-around ===
Rank	Gymnast	Nation	Preliminary					Final				Total
Rank	Gymnast	Nation	Hoop (rhythmic gymnastics)	Ball (rhythmic gymnastics)	Ribbon (rhythmic gymnastics)	Clubs (rhythmic gymnastics)	Total	Hoop (rhythmic gymnastics)	Ball (rhythmic gymnastics)	Ribbon (rhythmic gymnastics)	Clubs (rhythmic gymnastics)	Total
1st place, gold medalist(s)	Barbara Domingos	Brazil	31.600 Q	31.200 Q	30.100 Q	30.850 Q	123.750 Q	32.750	31.050	31.000	30.500	125.300
2nd place, silver medalist(s)	Geovanna Santos	Brazil	30.700 Q	30.900 Q	28.200 Q	30.700 Q	120.500 Q	32.400	30.650	30.550	31.200	124.800
3rd place, bronze medalist(s)	Sol Martínez	Argentina	31.350 Q	30.150 Q	27.800 Q	29.050 Q	118.350 Q	31.300	30.400	27.950	28.600	118.250
4	Lina Dussan	Colombia	28.450 Q	27.800 Q	25.150 Q	25.750 Q	107.150 Q	27.900	27.250	24.350	27.950	107.450
5	Celeste D'Arcángelo	Argentina	25.700	26.150	26.000 Q	27.600 Q	105.450 Q	29.050	25.800	24.350	28.050	107.250
6	Javiera Rubilar	Chile	26.200 Q	26.100 Q	23.400 Q	22.450 Q	98.150 Q	27.700	26.900	25.900	24.800	105.300
7	Vanessa Galindo	Colombia	27.500 Q	26.350 Q	22.950	23.850	100.650 Q	25.200	26.750	26.150	24.600	102.700
8	Sophia Fernández	Venezuela	25.450 Q	19.500	21.300	23.600 Q	89.850 Q	27.950	26.150	23.350	24.650	102.100
9	Jadeliz Zambrano	Venezuela	22.850	25.000 Q	23.050 Q	20.150	91.050 Q	25.100	24.250	23.150	24.900	97.400
10	Fabiana Abastoflor	Bolivia	24.350	24.700	19.850	22.400	91.300 Q	26.250	23.700	19.300	24.250	93.500
11	Oriana Viñas	Colombia	26.600	24.350	23.300 Q	24.900 Q	99.150	Did not advance				
12	Martina Ferrari	Chile	24.850	22.700	19.250	21.300	88.100	Did not advance				
13	Isabella Bellizzio	Venezuela	20.600	20.950	20.600	21.550	83.700	Did not advance				
14	Flavia León	Peru	21.250	22.700	20.950	17.800	82.700	Did not advance				
15	Ana Luísa Neiva	Brazil	27.600	30.200	27.600	24.350	82.150	Did not advance				
16	Valeria Cumpa	Peru	22.100	21.150	19.450	19.300	82.000	Did not advance				
17	Mayte Guzman	Bolivia	20.950	22.450	18.400	19.000	80.800	Did not advance				
18	Martina Gil	Argentina	25.950 Q	27.650 Q	22.050	24.250	99.900	Did not advance				
19	Carmen León	Peru	18.750			18.150	36.900	Did not advance				
20	Laura Yapias	Peru		18.500	15.500		34.000	Did not advance				
21	Maria Flávia Britto	Brazil			22.200		22.200	Did not advance				

=== Women's rhythmic individual ball ===
Rank	Gymnast	Nation	Art.	AD Score	BD Score	E Score	Pen.	Total		
Rank	Gymnast	Nation	1st place, gold medalist(s)	Barbara Domingos	Brazil	8.200	5.700	9.600	8.150	31.650
2nd place, silver medalist(s)	Geovanna Santos	Brazil	8.200	5.500	8.600	8.150		30.450		
3rd place, bronze medalist(s)	Sol Martínez	Argentina	8.050	9.000	5.100	8.250		30.400		
4	Lina Dussan	Colombia	7.900	4.800	7.700	7.900		28.300		
5	Vanessa Galindo	Colombia	8.050	4.600	7.300	7.900	0.05	27.800		
6	Javiera Rubilar	Chile	7.500	3.800	7.000	7.250	0.05	25.500		
7	Jadeliz Zambrano	Venezuela	7.100	4.500	5.800	6.500	0.3	23.600		
8	Martina Gil	Argentina	6.350	4.200	7.400	5.600	0.8	22.750		

=== Women's rhythmic individual club ===
Rank	Gymnast	Nation	Art.	AD Score	BD Score	E Score	Pen.	Total		
Rank	Gymnast	Nation	1st place, gold medalist(s)	Barbara Domingos	Brazil	8.050	5.000	9.000	8.150	30.200
2nd place, silver medalist(s)	Sol Martínez	Argentina	8.100	4.700	9.300	8.050		30.150		
3rd place, bronze medalist(s)	Geovanna Santos	Brazil	7.850	4.400	9.200	7.750		29.200		
4	Lina Dussan	Colombia	7.550	4.700	7.500	7.750		27.500		
5	Oriana Viñas	Colombia	7.400	3.500	7.300	7.800	0.05	25.950		
6	Javiera Rubilar	Chile	7.250	3.500	7.300	7.150		25.200		
7	Sophia Fernández	Venezuela	7.050	3.500	7.000	7.500		25.050		
8	Celeste D'Arcángelo	Argentina	6.900	3.600	6.900	6.800		24.200		

=== Women's rhythmic individual hoop ===
Rank	Gymnast	Nation	Art.	AD Score	BD Score	E Score	Pen.	Total		
Rank	Gymnast	Nation	1st place, gold medalist(s)	Geovanna Santos	Brazil	8.400	6.300	9.600	8.450	32.750
2nd place, silver medalist(s)	Barbara Domingos	Brazil	8.250	6.000	9.600	8.650		32.500		
3rd place, bronze medalist(s)	Sol Martínez	Argentina	7.500	5.400	9.100	7.650	0.6	29.050		
4	Javiera Rubilar	Chile	7.700	3.700	9.200	7.500		28.100		
5	Sophia Fernández	Venezuela	7.650	5.000	8.200	6.800		27.650		
6	Lina Dussan	Colombia	7.450	3.800	9.200	7.000		27.450		
7	Vanessa Galindo	Colombia	7.750	3.700	7.700	8.050		27.200		
8	Martina Gil	Argentina	7.600	4.500	7.800	7.050	0.05	26.900		

=== Women's rhythmic individual ribbon ===
Rank	Gymnast	Nation	Art.	AD Score	BD Score	E Score	Pen.	Total			
Rank	Gymnast	Nation	1st place, gold medalist(s)	Barbara Domingos	Brazil	8.100	5.300	8.900	7.950	0.4	29.850
2nd place, silver medalist(s)	Geovanna Santos	Brazil	7.900	4.300	9.000	8.050		29.250			
3rd place, bronze medalist(s)	Celeste D'Arcángelo	Argentina	7.550	4.400	8.100	7.250		27.300			
4	Sol Martínez	Argentina	7.700	4.100	7.400	7.750		26.950			
5	Javiera Rubilar	Chile	7.150	4.800	7.300	7.300	0.05	26.500			
6	Lina Dussan	Colombia	7.550	4.400	6.700	7.200		25.850			
7	Oriana Viñas	Colombia	7.600	3.600	7.000	7.600		25.800			
8	Jadeliz Zambrano	Venezuela	6.900	2.200	4.100	6.400		19.600			

=== Women's rhythmic group all-around ===
Position	Gymnast	Nation	5 Hoops	3 Ribbons, 2 Balls	Total
1st place, gold medalist(s)	Beatriz da Silva / Gabriella Coradine / Julia Kurunczi / Victória Borges / Sofia Pereira / Bárbara Galvão	Brazil	32.950 (1)	30.550 (1)	63.500
2nd place, silver medalist(s)	Dahilin Parra / Juliette Quiroz / María de los Ángeles Domínguez / María Waleska Ojeda / Roselyn Palencia / Yelbery Rodríguez	Venezuela	23.350 (3)	24.400 (2)	47.750
3rd place, bronze medalist(s)	Agustina Lujan / Evangelina Cordier / Karema Jara / Ludmila Miravet / Macarena Rodríguez / Milagros Centeno	Argentina	24.850 (2)	20.400 (4)	45.250
4	Adriana Mantilla / Angélica Guerrero / Karen Duarte / Kizzy Rivas / Natalia Jiménez / Nicol Mora	Colombia	22.000 (6)	21.800 (3)	43.800
5	Anneli Sepúlveda / Isabel Lozano / Josefina Romero / Martina Valdes / Valentina Cuello	Chile	23.150 (4)	17.800 (5)	40.950
6	Antonella Rocha / Camila Rodríguez / Grisely Bazalar / Hannah Navas / Nikole Cumpa	Peru	22.600 (5)	15.900 (6)	38.500

=== Women's rhythmic group 5 hoops ===
Rank	Gymnasts	Nation	Qualification					Final					
Rank	Gymnasts	Nation	Art.	AD Score	E Score	Pen.	Total	Art.	AD Score	BD Score	E Score	Pen.	Total
1st place, gold medalist(s)	Beatriz da Silva / Gabriella Coradine / Julia Kurunczi / Victória Borges / Sofia Pereira / Bárbara Galvão	Brazil	7.950	17.400	7.600		32.950 Q	8.100	7.900	7.400	7.800	0.1	31.100
2nd place, silver medalist(s)	Dahilin Parra / Juliette Quiroz / María de los Ángeles Domínguez / María Waleska Ojeda / Roselyn Palencia / Yelbery Rodríguez	Venezuela	6.550	12.500	5.500	1.2	23.350 Q	7.300	700	7.600	6.900		28.800
3rd place, bronze medalist(s)	Anneli Sepúlveda / Isabel Lozano / Josefina Romero / Martina Valdes / Valentina Cuello	Chile	6.650	11.000	5.500		23.150 Q	6.600	5.400	4.600	5.400	0.3	21.700
4	Agustina Lujan / Evangelina Cordier / Karema Jara / Ludmila Piva / Macarena Rodríguez / Milagros Centeno	Argentina	6.750	11.800	6.300		24.850 Q	6.250	5.800	4.200	4.700		20.950
5	Antonella Rocha / Camila Rodríguez / Grisely Bazalar / Hannah Navas / Nikole Cumpa	Peru	6.300	10.600	5.700		22.600	Did not advance					
6	Adriana Mantilla / Angélica Guerrero / Karen Duarte / Kizzy Rivas / Natalia Jiménez / Nicol Mora	Colombia	6.300	10.900	5.100	0.3	22.000	Did not advance					

=== Women's rhythmic group 3 ribbons + 2 balls ===
Rank	Gymnasts	Nation	Qualification						Final					
Rank	Gymnasts	Nation	Art.	AD Score	BD Score	E Score	Pen.	Total	Art.	AD Score	BD Score	E Score	Pen.	Total
1st place, gold medalist(s)	Beatriz da Silva / Gabriella Coradine / Julia Kurunczi / Victória Borges / Sofia Pereira / Bárbara Galvão	Brazil	8.000	7.800	7.600	7.150		30.550 Q	8.250	7.600	6.900	7.200		29.950
2nd place, silver medalist(s)	Dahilin Parra / Juliette Quiroz / María de los Ángeles Domínguez / María Waleska Ojeda / Roselyn Palencia / Yelbery Rodríguez	Venezuela	7.000	5.100	6.000	6.350	0.05	24.400 Q	6.750	6.300	5.600	6.150	0.1	24.700
3rd place, bronze medalist(s)	Adriana Mantilla / Angélica Guerrero / Karen Duarte / Kizzy Rivas / Natalia Jiménez / Nicol Mora	Colombia	6.800	5.500	3.500	6.050	0.05	21.800 Q	6.650	6.00	4.700	5.450	0.1	22.700
4	Agustina Lujan / Evangelina Cordier / Karema Jara / Ludmila Piva / Macarena Rodríguez / Milagros Centeno	Argentina	6.150	5.100	3.300	5.850		20.400 Q	6.400	6.000	3.400	5.550		21.350
5	Anneli Sepúlveda / Isabel Lozano / Josefina Romero / Martina Valdes / Valentina Cuello	Chile	5.800	4.200	2.600	5.200		17.800	Did not advance					
6	Antonella Rocha / Camila Rodríguez / Grisely Bazalar / Hannah Navas / Nikole Cumpa	Peru	5.550	3.400	2.400	5.150	0.6	15.900	Did not advance					

=== Men's individual trampoline ===
Rank	Gymnasts	Nation	Qualification					Final				
Rank	Gymnasts	Nation	Diff.	Horizon	Exce.	Time of F.	Total	Diff.	Horizon	Exce.	Time of F.	Total
1st place, gold medalist(s)	Ángel Hernández	Colombia	16.600	9.300	14.100	16.295	56.295 Q	16.200	9.300	15.700	16.240	57.440
2nd place, silver medalist(s)	Rayan Dutra	Brazil	15.000	9.400	16.000	15.620	56.020 Q	15.000	9.400	16.000	15.620	56.020
3rd place, bronze medalist(s)	Lucas Tobias	Brazil	15.200	9.200	15.000	15.145	54.545 Q	15.400	9.100	15.200	15.540	55.240
4	Santiago Ferrari	Argentina	14.800	9.200	14.200	16.055	54.255 Q	15.800	8.900	13.000	16.060	53.760
5	Álvaro Calero	Colombia	10.300	8.800	15.000	15.585	49.685 Q	13.300	8.100	12.900	14.370	48.670
6	Miguel Valencia	Peru	11.100	8.600	14.800	14.605	49.105 Q	2.300	1.900	3.000	3.140	10.340
7	Miguel Benavides	Venezuela	12.400	9.100	11.500	14.585	47.585 Q	1.500	1.600	1.400	2.950	7.450
8	Federico Cury	Argentina	12.900	9.300	16.300	16.200	54.700 Q	2.000	1.000	1.400	1.760	6.160
9	Sebastián Marquez	Venezuela	10.200	7.200	11.400	12.700	41.500	Did not advance				
10	David Figueroa	Peru	6.900	8.100	11.400	11.970	38.370	Did not advance				

=== Women's individual trampoline ===
Rank	Gymnasts	Nation	Qualification						Final				
Rank	Gymnasts	Nation	Diff.	Horizon	Exce.	Pen.	Time of F.	Total	Diff.	Horizon	Exce.	Time of F.	Total
1st place, gold medalist(s)	Camilla Gomes	Brazil	12.800	9.600	15.700		15.200	53.300 Q	13.600	9.400	15.800	15.020	53.820
2nd place, silver medalist(s)	Alice Gomes	Brazil	12.800	8.700	14.800		14.615	50.915 Q	12.600	8.900	15.700	14.540	51.740
3rd place, bronze medalist(s)	Katish Hernández	Colombia	10.700	9.400	15.000		14.820	49.920 Q	10.700	9.200	15.400	14.860	50.160
4	Valentina Podesta	Argentina	9.400	9.700	15.800		14.900	49.800 Q	8.800	9.200	15.900	14.200	48.970
5	Florencia Braun	Argentina	8.700	8.900	16.000		14.360	47.960 Q	8.700	9.300	15.300	14.200	47.500
6	Mariana Espejo	Bolivia	8.100	8.900	12.500	0.2	13.145	42.445 Q	8.100	9.200	13.900	13.350	44.550
7	Sol Lobo	Venezuela	7.600	8.700	12.300		13.290	41.890 Q	8.200	9.300	12.800	12.990	43.290
8	Anahi Rocha	Bolivia	5.600	9.300	13.200		12.270	40.370 Q	1.600	1.900	3.000	2.600	9.100

== See also ==
- 2022 South American Artistic Gymnastics Championships
- 2022 South American Rhythmic Gymnastics Championships
- 2022 South American Trampoline Championships
