= Brisa Carraro =

Argentine artistic gymnast

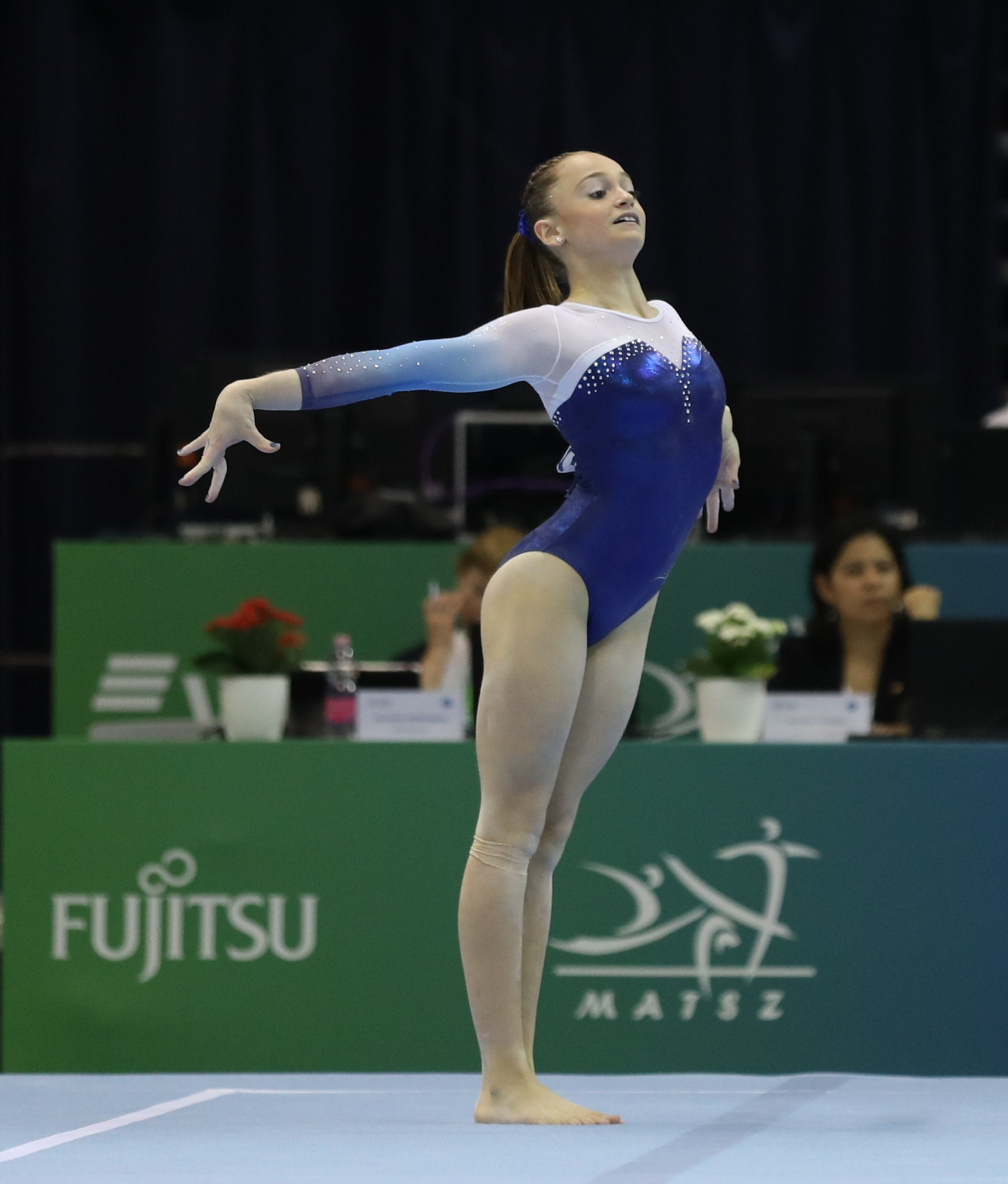
- Carraro at the 2019 Junior World Championships

Personal information
- Full name: Brisa Ailen Carraro
- Born: 8 May 2005 (age 21) Buenos Aires, Argentina

Gymnastics career
- Country represented: Argentina (2018–present)
- College team: LIU Sharks (2024–27)
- Club: National Centre of High Performance Athletics
- Head coach: Vanesa Molina
Medal record
Representing Argentina
Pan American Championships
Bronze medal – third place	2021 Rio de Janeiro	Team
South American Games
Silver medal – second place	2022 Asunción	Team
Silver medal – second place	2022 Asunción	Uneven bars
Silver medal – second place	2022 Asunción	Balance beam
Bronze medal – third place	2022 Asunción	All-around
South American Championships
Gold medal – first place	2021 San Juan	Uneven bars
Silver medal – second place	2021 San Juan	Team
Silver medal – second place	2023 Cali	Team

Brisa Ailen Carraro (born 8 May 2005) is an Argentine artistic gymnast. She is the 2021 South American champion on the uneven bars. She currently competes for Long Island University.

== Early life ==
Carraro was born in Buenos Aires in 2005. She won the 2016 edition of the TV talent contest Combate de Talentos.

== Junior gymnastics career ==
=== 2018 ===
Carraro started the season competing at the Junior Pan American Championships, where she helped Argentina finish third as team; Carraro finished twenty-fourth in the all-around. Additionally she finished seventh floor exercise. Carraro next competed at the Argentinian Club Championships where she placed sixth in the all-around and helped her club place fourth. In October Carraro competed at the Junior South American Championships where she helped Argentina finish second as a team and individually she placed third in the all-around. During event finals she placed sixth on balance beam. Carraro ended the season competing at the Argentinian national championships where she placed sixth in the all-around. She won gold on balance beam.

=== 2019–2020 ===
At the Club Championships Carraro placed fourth in the all-around. At the Flanders International Team Challenge she placed twenty-sixth in the all-around and helped Argentina finish seventh. Carraro was selected to compete at the inaugural Junior World Championships where she helped Argentina finish eighteenth as a team. Individually she finished 52nd in the all-around. At the Argentine National Championships Carraro finished second in the all-around, first on uneven bars, and third on balance beam. Carraro ended the season competing at the Junior South American Championships. She placed first in the all-around and helped Argentina place first as a team. During event finals she placed third on balance beam and fourth on uneven bars.

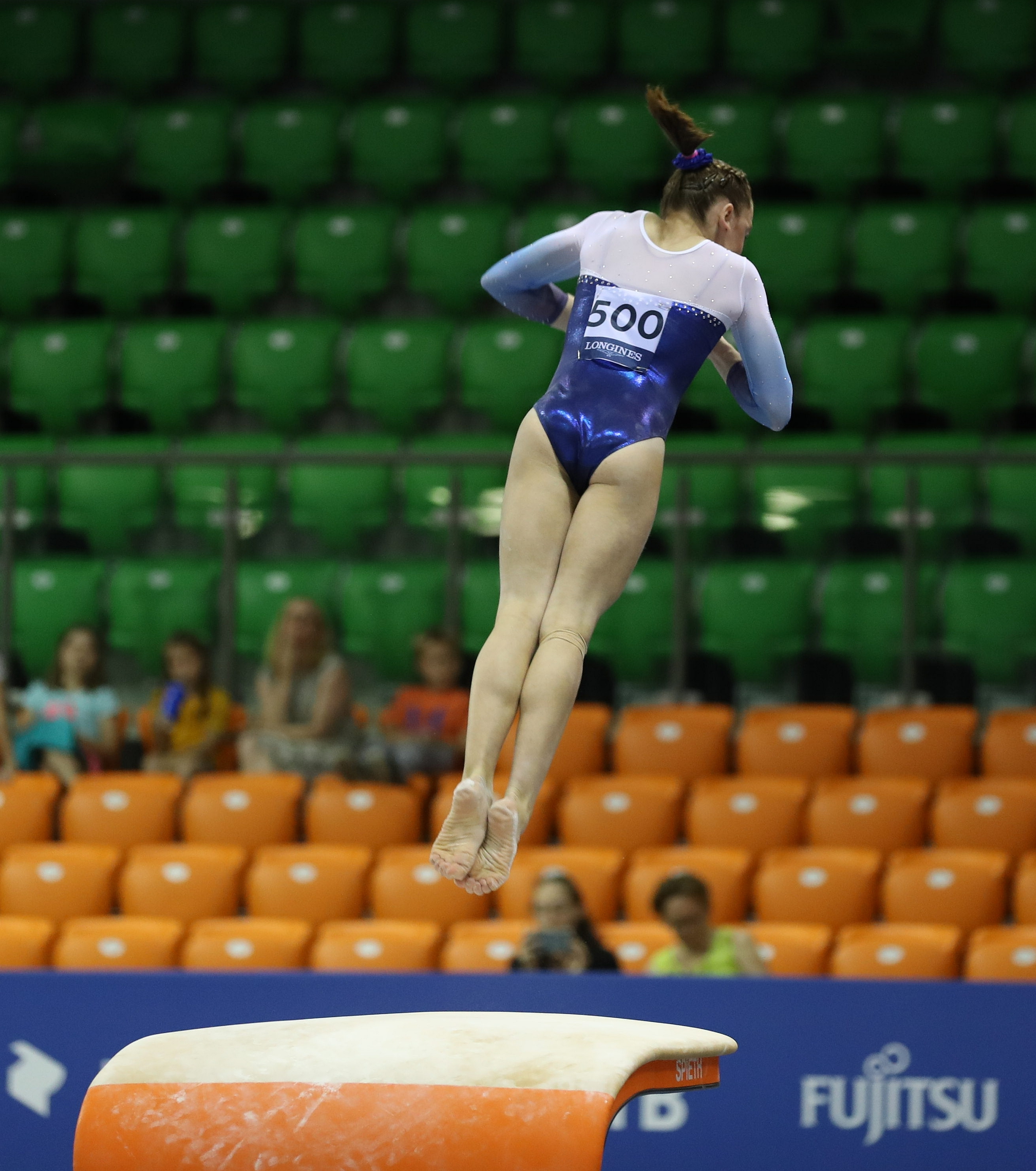
Vault

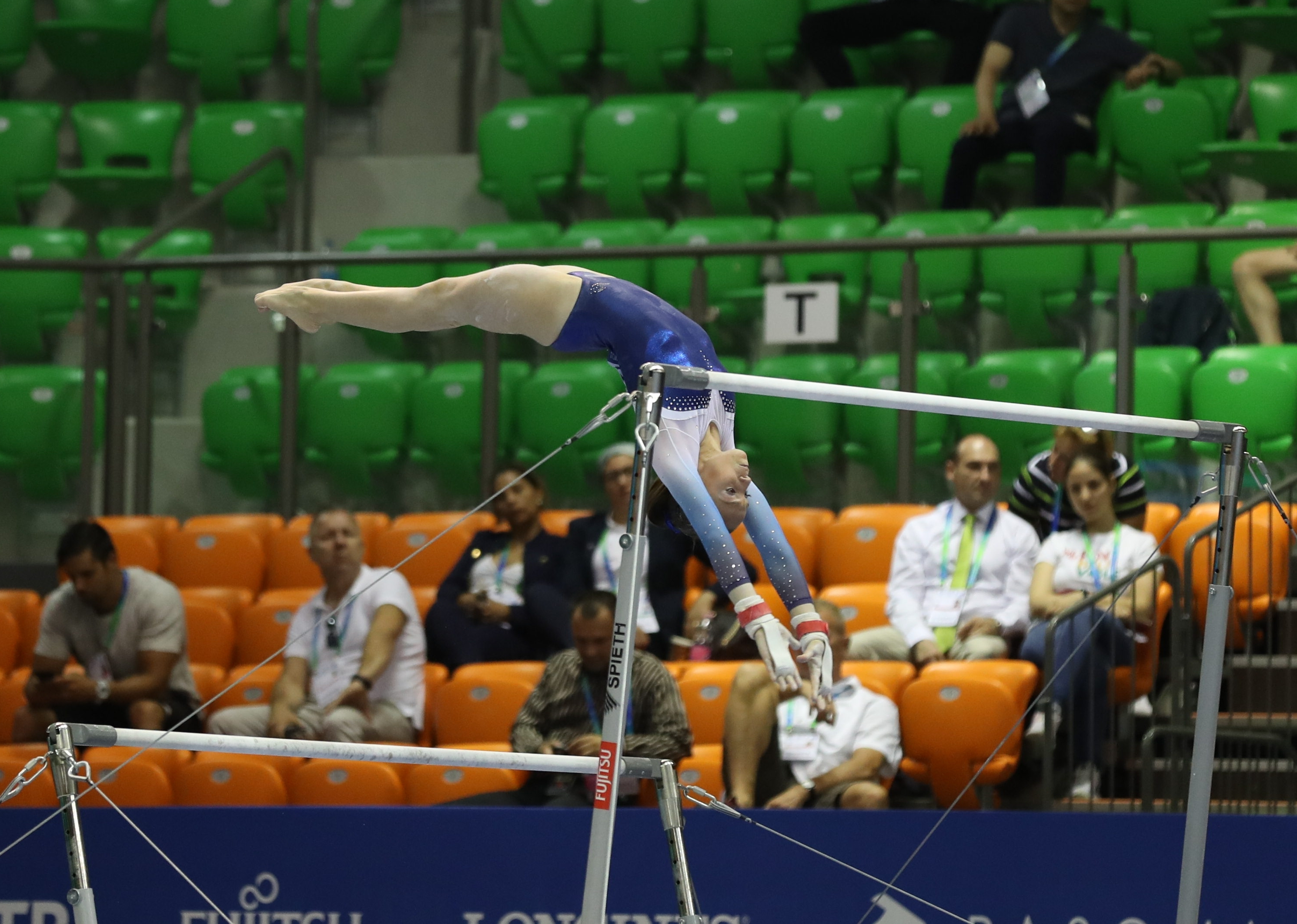
Uneven Bars

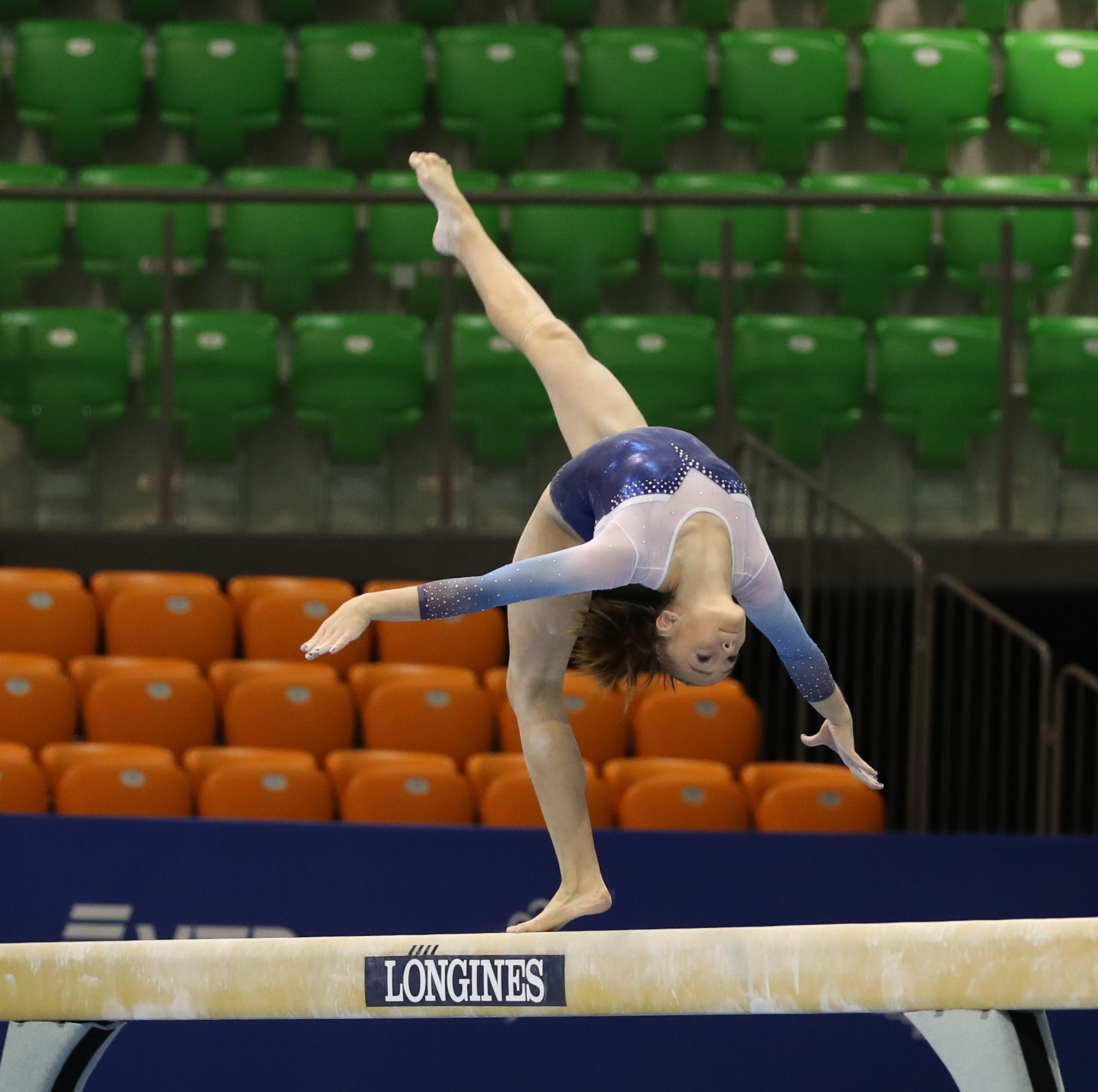
Balance Beam

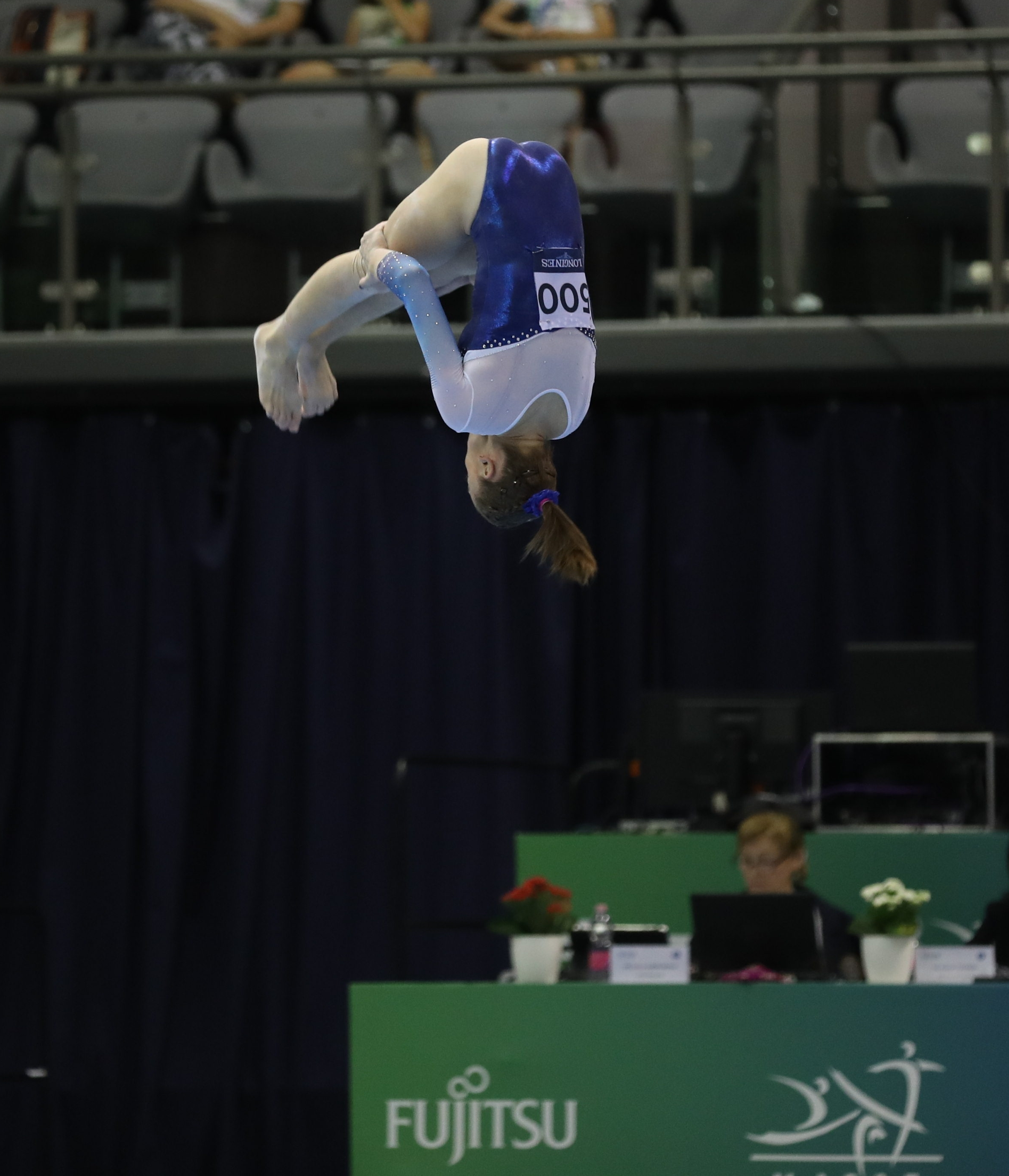
Floor Exercise

Carraro at the 2019 Junior World Championships

Most competitions were canceled or postponed in 2020 due to the global COVID-19 pandemic. Therefore, Carraro did not compete that year.

== Senior gymnastics career ==
=== 2021 ===
Carraro turned senior in 2021. She returned to competition at the 2021 Pan American Championships where she helped Argentina place third as a team and individually she placed eleventh in the all-around. During event finals she placed sixth on uneven bars. Carraro ended the year competing at the South American Championships where she helped Argentina finish second as a team. Individually she won gold on uneven bars and placed fourth on vault.

=== 2022 ===
Brisa competed at the Pan American Championships where she helped Argentina place fifth as a team. Individually she placed sixth in the all-around and eighth on floor exercise. At the South American Games Carraro helped Argentina finish second a team. She finished third in the all-around behind Júlia Soares and Carolyne Pedro. Additionally she won silver on uneven bars and balance beam, once again behind Pedro and Soares respectively.

== Collegiate gymnastics career ==
=== 2024 ===
Carraro made her collegiate debut January 14th on bars against UNH.

== Competitive history ==
Year	Event	Team	AA	VT	UB	BB	FX
Junior
2018
2018	Pan American Championships	3rd place, bronze medalist(s)					7
2018	ARG Club Championships	4	6				
2018	South American Championships	2nd place, silver medalist(s)	3rd place, bronze medalist(s)			6	
2018	National Championships		6			1st place, gold medalist(s)	
2019	ARG Club Championships		4				
2019	FIT Challenge	7	26				
2019	Junior World Championships	18	52				
2019	National Championships		2nd place, silver medalist(s)		1st place, gold medalist(s)	3rd place, bronze medalist(s)	
2019	South American Championships	1st place, gold medalist(s)	1st place, gold medalist(s)		4	3rd place, bronze medalist(s)	
Senior
2021
2021	Pan American Championships	3rd place, bronze medalist(s)	11		6		
2021	South American Championships	2nd place, silver medalist(s)		4	1st place, gold medalist(s)		
2022
2022	Pan American Championships	5	6		11	11	8
2022	South American Games	2nd place, silver medalist(s)	3rd place, bronze medalist(s)		2nd place, silver medalist(s)	2nd place, silver medalist(s)	6
2022	World Championships	20					
2023	South American Championships	2nd place, silver medalist(s)	14				
2023	World Championships	24					
