= Ana Luiza Lima =

Brazilian artistic gymnast

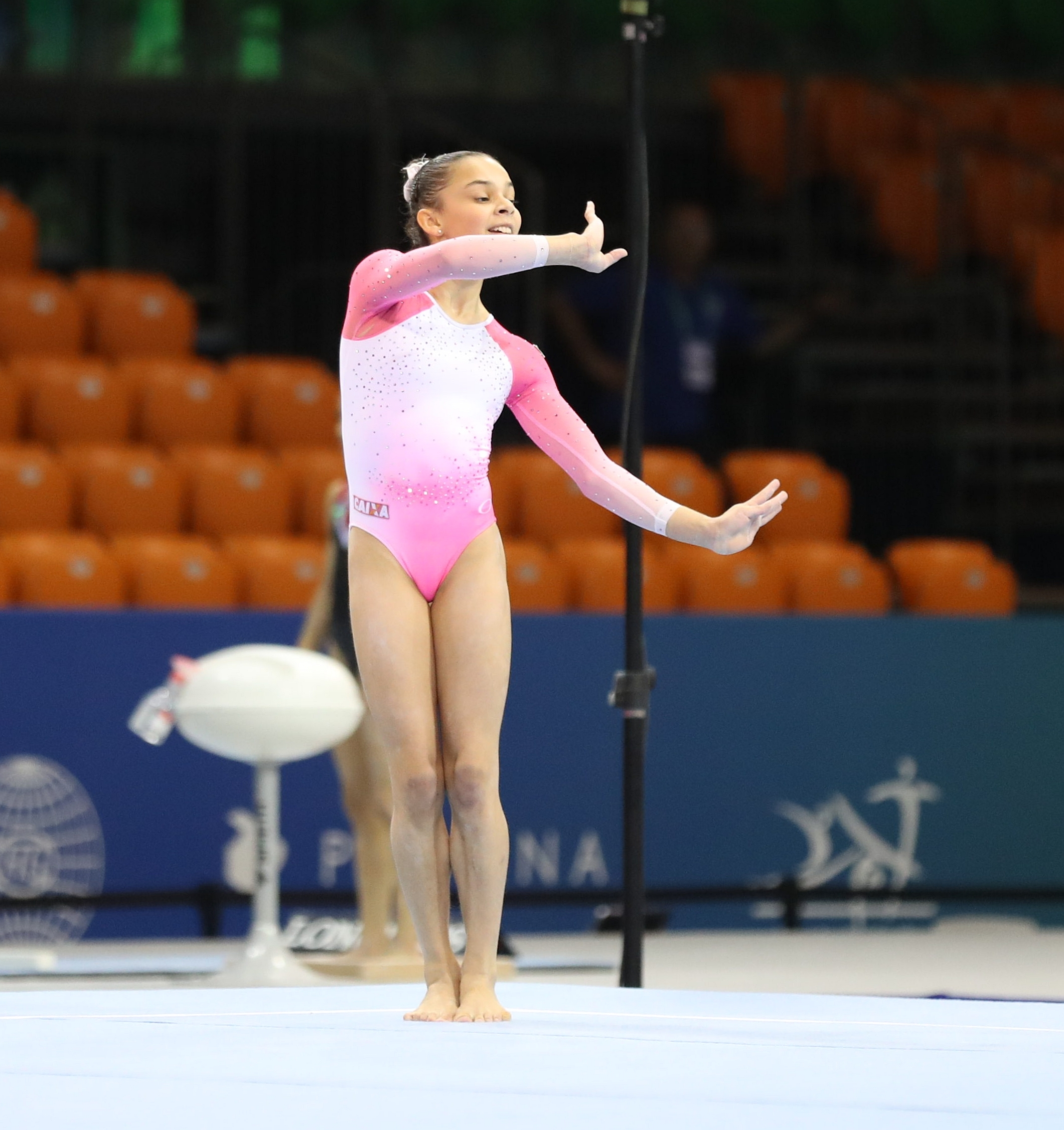
- Lima at the 2019 Junior World Championships

Personal information
- Full name: Ana Luiza Pires Lima
- Born: 8 August 2005 (age 21) Telêmaco Borba, Brazil

Gymnastics career
- Discipline: Women's artistic gymnastics
- Country represented: Brazil; (2018–present)
- Club: Centro de Excelencia de Ginastica (CEGIN)
- Head coach: Iryna Ilyashenko
Medal record
Women's artistic gymnastics
Representing Brazil
Pan American Championships
Gold medal – first place	2021 Rio de Janeiro	Team
Gold medal – first place	2021 Rio de Janeiro	Floor Exercise
South American Championships
Gold medal – first place	2021 San Juan	Team
Bronze medal – third place	2021 San Juan	Balance Beam
Bronze medal – third place	2021 San Juan	Floor

Ana Luiza Pires Lima (born 8 August 2005) is a Brazilian artistic gymnast and a member of the Brazilian national gymnastics team. Lima represented her country at the 2019 Junior World Championships. She made her international senior debut at the 2021 Pan American Championships where she helped Brazil win the team gold and also won an individual gold medal on the floor exercise.

== Early life ==
Lima was born on 8 August 2005 in Telêmaco Borba. At age seven, she was discovered by the coaches of her current club, CEGIN, who visited Leopoldo Mercer Municipal School to detect talents. Lima was the only child from the school who was selected. She then moved to Curitiba to dedicate herself to gymnastics.

== Career ==
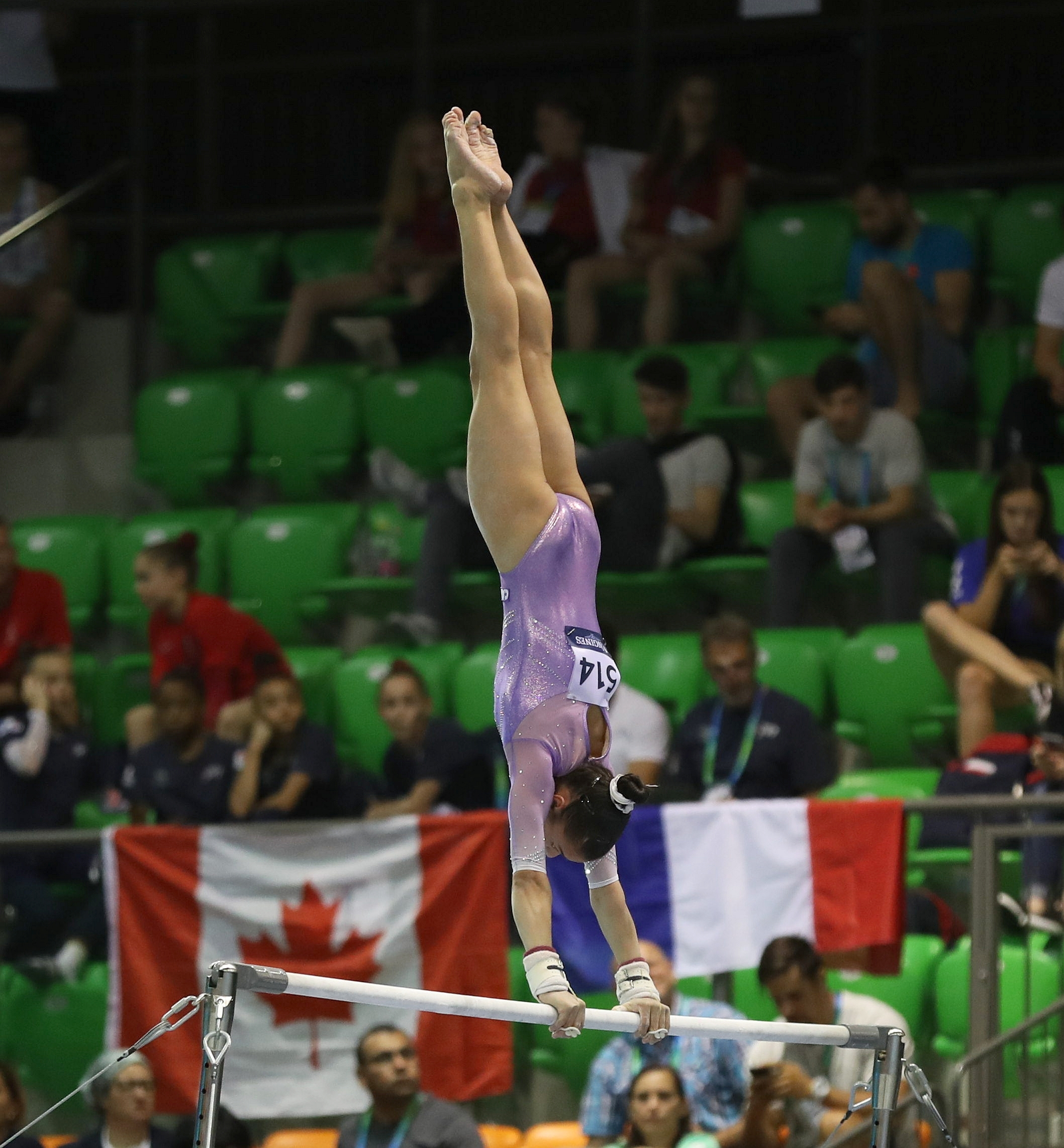
Lima on the uneven bars at the Junior World Championships

In September 2017, Lima became the Brazilian national all-around champion in the espoir age-group, also taking the gold medal on floor, as well as the silver on vault, uneven bars and the balance beam.

In March 2018, Lima competed at the City of Jesolo Trophy in Italy, where she placed seventh with the Brazilian junior team and 25th in the individual all-around. In May, she underwent surgery for an injury which forced her out of training for a month. Lima returned to competition in August, taking the bronze medal in the floor exercise final at the Brazilian Event Championships, in a field of mixed junior and senior competitors. She went on to represent Brazil at the 2018 Junior South American Championships in Lima, Peru, winning the gold in the all-around, silver on floor, bronze on vault, and contributing to the Brazilian team’s first place finish ahead of Argentina and Peru. In November, she once again became the Brazilian junior all-around champion.

Lima opened her 2019 season at the WOGA Classic in Frisco, Texas, earning the silver medal on floor behind Skye Blakely, with Kayla DiCello taking the bronze. At the 2019 Brazilian Event Championships, Lima placed ninth in the all-around and won gold on floor. Lima was selected to the Brazilian team for the 2019 Junior World Championships alongside Júlia Soares and Christal Bezerra. She placed 29th in the individual all-around and contributed to the Brazilian team’s seventh place finish in a field of 29 teams.

Lima became age-eligible for senior competition in 2021. At the 2021 Pan American Championships held in Rio de Janeiro, she helped Brazil win the gold medal in the team final, and also earned an individual gold in the floor exercise final.

At the 2021 South American Championships, Lima was part of the Brazilian team that won the gold medal ahead of Argentina and Chile. Individually, Lima placed fourth in the all-around and picked up the bronze medals in the balance beam and floor exercise finals.

== Competitive history ==
Year	Event	Team	AA	VT	UB	BB	FX
Junior
2017	Brazilian Junior Championships		1st place, gold medalist(s)	2nd place, silver medalist(s)	2nd place, silver medalist(s)	2nd place, silver medalist(s)	1st place, gold medalist(s)
2018	City of Jesolo Trophy	7	25				
2018	Brazilian Event Championships						3rd place, bronze medalist(s)
2018	South American Junior Championships	1st place, gold medalist(s)	1st place, gold medalist(s)	3rd place, bronze medalist(s)		5	2nd place, silver medalist(s)
2018	Brazilian Junior Championships		1st place, gold medalist(s)	1st place, gold medalist(s)	1st place, gold medalist(s)	2nd place, silver medalist(s)	1st place, gold medalist(s)
2019	WOGA Classic		8				2nd place, silver medalist(s)
2019	Brazilian Event Championships		9				1st place, gold medalist(s)
2019	Junior World Championships	7	29				
Senior
2021
2021	Pan American Championships	1st place, gold medalist(s)					1st place, gold medalist(s)
2021	Brazilian Championships	2nd place, silver medalist(s)	5		7		6
2021	South American Championships	1st place, gold medalist(s)				3rd place, bronze medalist(s)	3rd place, bronze medalist(s)
2025	Brazil Trophy				1st place, gold medalist(s)	3rd place, bronze medalist(s)	
2025	Brazilian Championships				1st place, gold medalist(s)		
2025	World University Games				R1		
2025	Szombathely World Challenge Cup				3rd place, bronze medalist(s)		
2026	American Cup	7					
