= Daira Lamadrid =

Colombian artistic gymnast (born 2006)

- Full name: Daira Gisell Lamadrid Peñuela
- Born: August 7, 2006 (age 20) Bucaramanga, Colombia

Gymnastics career
- Country represented: Colombia
- Club: Liga Norte de Santander
- Head coaches: Roberto León; Adriana Ángel
- Assistant coach: Jess Graba
Medal record
Women's artistic gymnastics
Representing Colombia
Pan American Championships
Gold medal – first place	2024 Santa Marta	Uneven bars
South American Games
Bronze medal – third place	2022 Asunción	Team
Bolivarian Games
Gold medal – first place	2022 Valledupar	Team
Silver medal – second place	2022 Valledupar	Uneven bars

Daira Gisell Lamadrid Peñuela (born August 7, 2006) is a Colombian artistic gymnast. She was the 2024 Pan American champion on uneven bars. She was also part of the bronze medal-winning Colombian team at the 2022 South American Games.

== Senior career ==
=== 2022 ===
Lamadrid made her senior debut at the 2022 Bolivarian Games, where she won gold with the Colombian team as well as silver on uneven bars. She also placed fifth in the all-around competition.

At the 2022 Pan American Championships, Lamadrid competed on all four events in the team final, contributing to Colombia's sixth-place finish.

Lamadrid competed at the 2022 South American Games, winning the bronze medal with the Colombian team. Additionally, she qualified for the balance beam final, ultimately placing eighth.

=== 2023 ===
Lamadrid performed routines on uneven bars and balance beam at the 2023 Pan American Championships, with Colombia finishing sixth in the team competition.

In October, Lamadrid represented Colombia at the 2023 Pan American Games in Santiago, Chile with teammates Luisa Blanco, Ginna Escobar, Angélica Mesa, and Yiseth Valenzuela. They finished fifth as a team.

At the 2023 Colombian National Games, Lamadrid won gold in the all-around and on balance beam, in addition to silver on uneven bars, bronze on floor exercise, and bronze with the Norte de Santander department team.

In November, Lamadrid began training in the United States with Jess Graba, who is also the coach of Olympic Champion Sunisa Lee.

=== 2024 ===
Lamadrid began the 2024 season by competing on uneven bars and balance beam at three World Cup events in Cairo, Cottbus, and Baku. She did not advance to any finals.

In May, Lamadrid competed at the 2024 Pan American Championships, winning the gold medal on uneven bars ahead of Sydney Turner of Canada and Meline Mesropian of Argentina. This was the first gold medal for a Colombian woman at the Pan American Championships since Bibiana Vélez won gold on the same event in 2012, and the second gold overall. Lamadrid also competed in the all-around, placing 19th, and contributed to Colombia's sixth-place finish as a team.

=== 2025 ===
At the 2025 Pan American Championships, Lamadrid competed on all four events, placing 14th in the all-around. She also helped Colombia qualify for the team final, where they finished seventh.

== Competitive history ==
Competitive history of Daira Lamadrid at the junior level
Year	Event	Team	AA	VT	UB	BB	FX
2018	Colombian Championships		3rd place, bronze medalist(s)			5	2nd place, silver medalist(s)
2019
2019	Colombian Championships				1st place, gold medalist(s)	1st place, gold medalist(s)	3rd place, bronze medalist(s)
2019	South American Junior Championships						
2021
2021	Colombian Control Meet		1st place, gold medalist(s)	1st place, gold medalist(s)	1st place, gold medalist(s)	1st place, gold medalist(s)	1st place, gold medalist(s)
2021	Junior Pan American Games		7		8	7	

Competitive history of Daira Lamadrid at the senior level
Year	Event	Team	AA	VT	UB	BB	FX
2022
2022	Bolivarian Games	1st place, gold medalist(s)	5		2nd place, silver medalist(s)	6	
2022	Pan American Championships	6					
2022	South American Games	3rd place, bronze medalist(s)				8	
2023
2023	Colombian Championships				3rd place, bronze medalist(s)	1st place, gold medalist(s)	3rd place, bronze medalist(s)
2023	Pan American Championships	6					
2023	2nd Colombian Championships		3rd place, bronze medalist(s)	2nd place, silver medalist(s)	2nd place, silver medalist(s)	4	5
2023	Pan American Games	5					
2023	Colombian National Games	3rd place, bronze medalist(s)	1st place, gold medalist(s)		2nd place, silver medalist(s)	1st place, gold medalist(s)	3rd place, bronze medalist(s)
2024
2024	Cairo World Cup						
2024	Cottbus World Cup						
2024	Baku World Cup						
2024	Colombian Championships				1st place, gold medalist(s)	5	1st place, gold medalist(s)
2024	Pan American Championships	7	19		1st place, gold medalist(s)		
2025
2025	Colombian Championships		4		2nd place, silver medalist(s)	4	6
2025	Pan American Championships	7					
