= Julia Soares =

Brazilian artistic gymnast

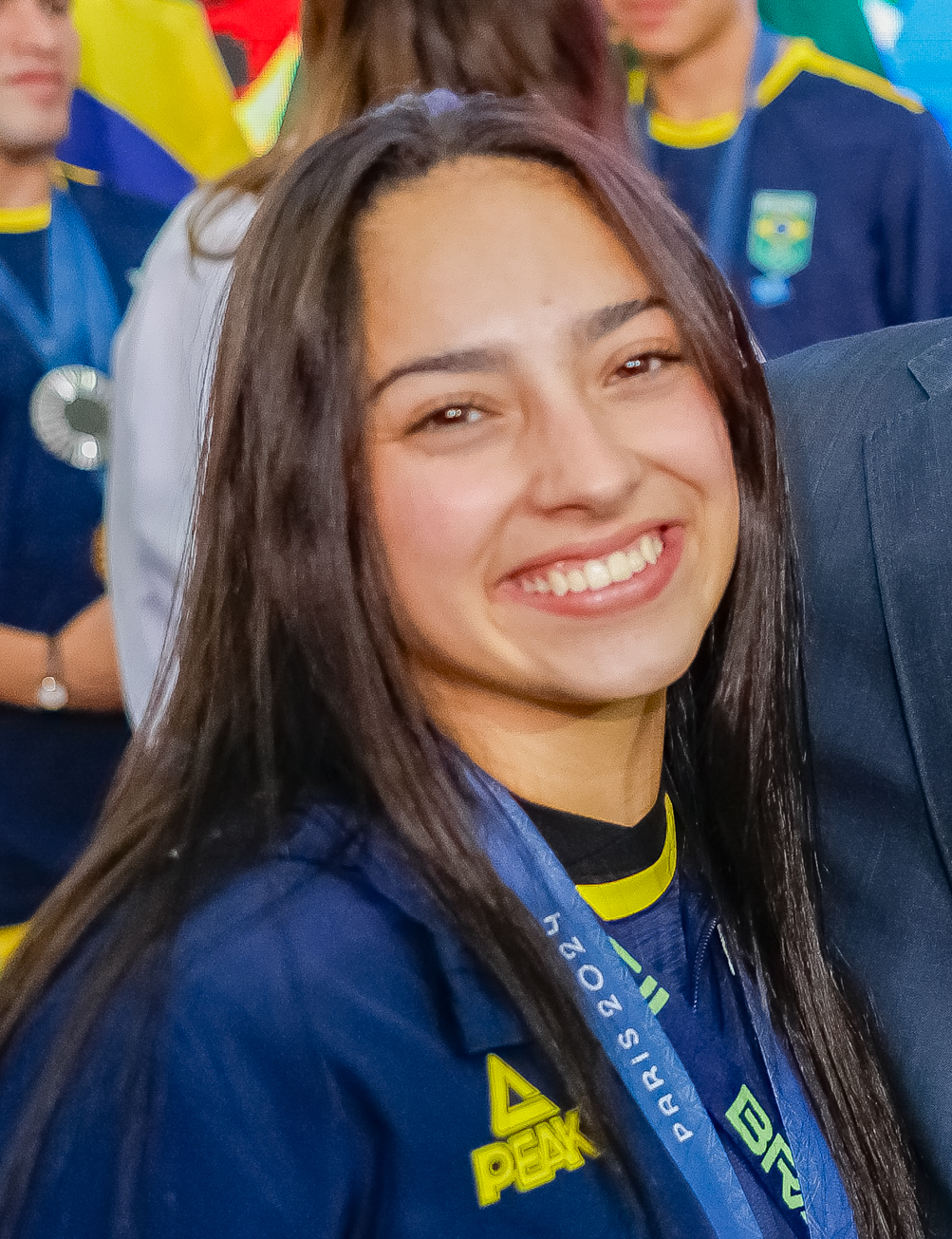
- Soares in August 2024

Personal information
- Full name: Julia das Neves Botega Soares
- Nickname: Juju
- Born: 23 August 2005 (age 21) Curitiba, Brazil

Gymnastics career
- Discipline: Women's artistic gymnastics
- Country represented: Brazil (2018–present)
- Club: Esporte Clube Pinheiros (ECP)
- Head coach: Iryna Ilyashenko
- Assistant coach: Caroline Molinari
- Eponymous skills: Soares (balance beam)
Medal record
Women's artistic gymnastics
Representing Brazil
Olympic Games
| Bronze medal – third place | 2024 Paris | Team |
World Championships
| Silver medal – second place | 2023 Antwerp | Team |
Pan American Games
| Silver medal – second place | 2023 Santiago | Team |
Pan American Championships
| Gold medal – first place | 2021 Rio de Janeiro | Team |
| Gold medal – first place | 2022 Rio de Janeiro | Team |
| Silver medal – second place | 2026 Rio de Janeiro | Team |
| Bronze medal – third place | 2021 Rio de Janeiro | Balance beam |
South American Games
| Gold medal – first place | 2022 Asunción | Team |
| Gold medal – first place | 2022 Asunción | All-around |
| Gold medal – first place | 2022 Asunción | Balance beam |
| Gold medal – first place | 2022 Asunción | Floor exercise |
South American Championships
| Gold medal – first place | 2021 San Juan | Team |
| Gold medal – first place | 2021 San Juan | All-around |
| Gold medal – first place | 2021 San Juan | Balance beam |
| Gold medal – first place | 2021 San Juan | Floor exercise |
| Bronze medal – third place | 2021 San Juan | Uneven bars |
FIG World Cup
| Event | 1st | 2nd | 3rd |
|---|---|---|---|
| Apparatus World Cup | 1 | 0 | 0 |
| World Challenge Cup | 0 | 1 | 0 |
| Total | 1 | 1 | 0 |

Julia das Neves Botega Soares (born 23 August 2005) is a Brazilian artistic gymnast and a member of the Brazilian national gymnastics team. Soares represented her country at the 2019 Junior World Championships, where she was a finalist on the balance beam. She made her international senior debut at the 2021 Pan American Championships where she helped Brazil win the team gold, and also took an individual bronze medal on the balance beam. She debuted a new skill, a candle mount with a half twist on the balance beam, which was named after her in the Code of Points. She was part of the silver medal-winning Brazilian team at the 2023 World Championships, and of the bronze medal-winning team at the 2024 Paris Olympics.

== Early life ==
Soares was born on 23 August 2005 in Curitiba, and grew up in nearby Colombo. She took up gymnastics at age four, inspired by her older sister Giovanna. Her role model in gymnastics is fellow Brazilian artistic gymnast Daniele Hypólito.

== Gymnastics career ==
=== 2018 ===
In April 2018, Soares competed at the City of Jesolo Trophy in Italy, contributing to Brazil’s seventh-place finish. She then won gold in the all-around and on the balance beam at the Brazilian Championships. In October 2018, she became the South American junior champion on the balance beam. At the Brazilian Junior Championships, she placed third in the all-around and won the gold on the balance beam, also taking the silver on vault, bars, and floor.

=== 2019 ===
In 2019, Soares placed fifth in the all-around at the Brazilian Event Championships, and took the bronze in both the balance beam and the floor exercise finals in a field of mixed junior and senior competitors. Soares was selected to the Brazilian team for the 2019 Junior World Championships alongside Ana Luiza Lima and Christal Bezerra. She placed 15th in the individual all-around and contributed to the Brazilian team’s seventh place finish in a field of 29 teams. She also qualified to the balance beam final, where she finished seventh. Soares went on to compete at the Brazilian Championships, becoming the junior national champion in the all-around as well as on the balance beam and on the floor exercise.

At the 2019 South American Junior Championships in Cali, Colombia, Soares earned the bronze medal in the all-around, the silver on beam, gold on floor, and contributed to the Brazilian team's second-place finish behind Argentina. She finished her 2019 season by winning four gold medals at the Brazilian Junior Championships.

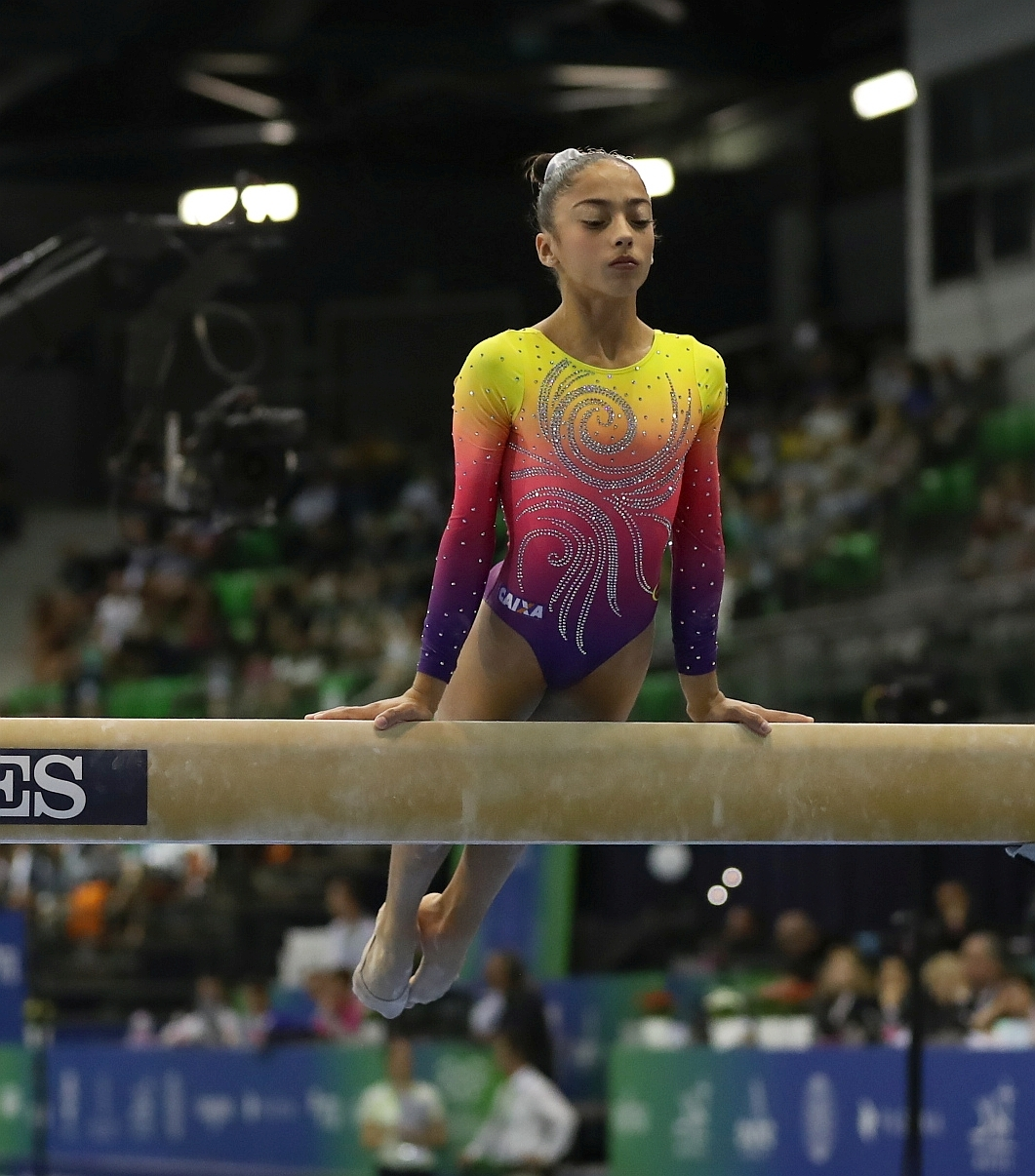
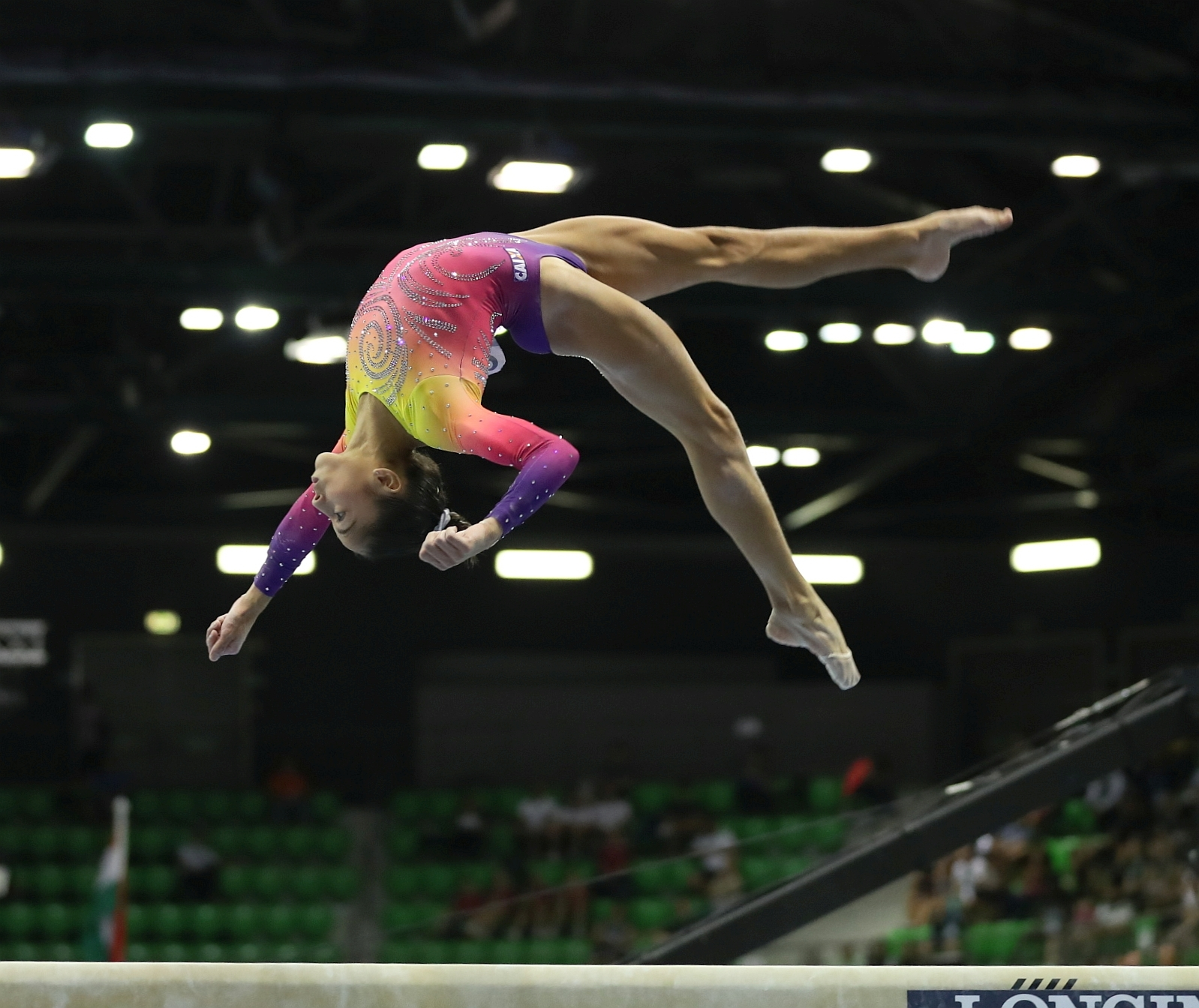
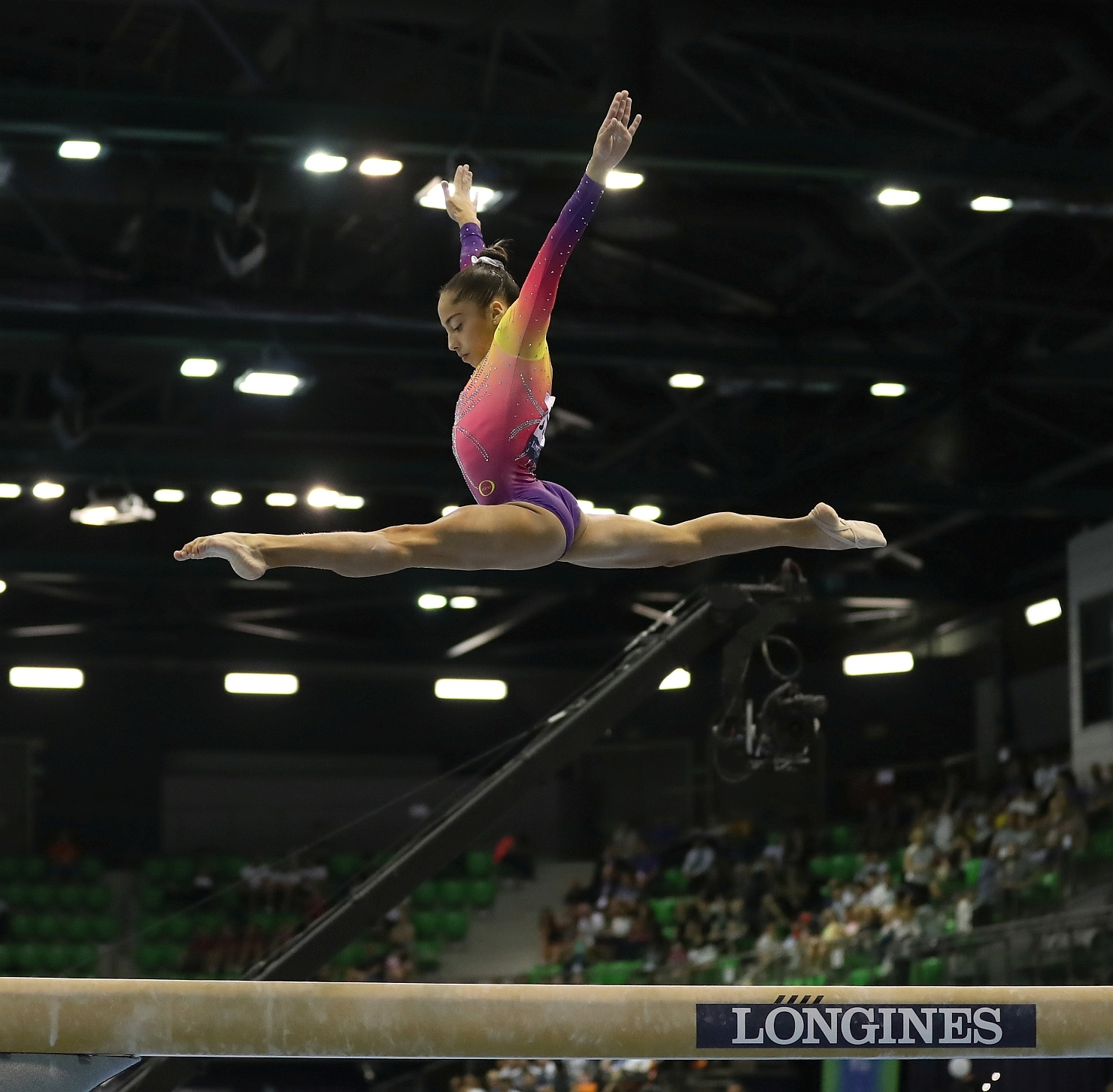
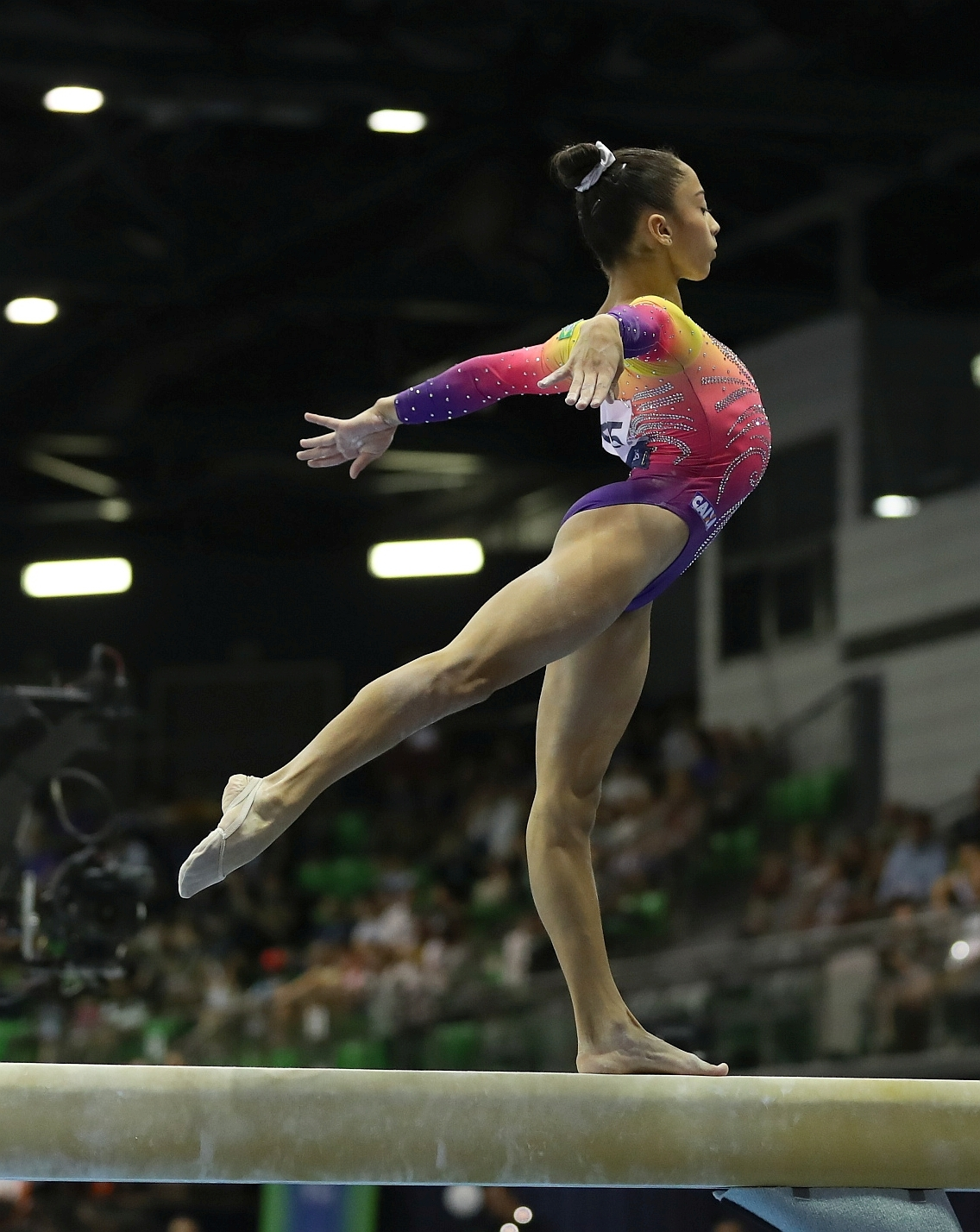
Soares competing in the balance beam final at the 2019 Junior World Championships

=== 2021 ===
Soares began competing as a senior in 2021. At the 2021 Pan American Championships held in Rio de Janeiro, she helped Brazil win the gold medal in the team final, and also earned an individual bronze in the balance beam final. In addition, Soares performed a candle mount with a half twist on the balance beam, which was named after her in the Code of Points, as she was the first gymnast to successfully perform the skill at an FIG international competition.

=== 2022 ===
At the 2022 Pan American Championships, Soares helped the Brazilian team win gold and qualify for the World Championships in Liverpool. In September, she competed in the South American Games, in which she won the gold medal in team and all-around finals, in addition to balance beam and floor exercise.

=== 2023 ===
At the DTB Pokal Stuttgart, Soares won the gold medal on floor exercise. In October, Soares competed at the World Championships along with teammates Rebeca Andrade, Jade Barbosa, Lorrane Oliveira and Flávia Saraiva. The team took the silver medal behind the United States — Brazil's first team medal in World Championship history. Later that month, Soares competed at the Pan American Games, where the Brazilian team once again took silver behind the United States. Individually, she finished fourth in the floor final.

=== 2024 ===
Soares competed at the 2024 City of Jesolo Trophy where she helped Brazil place second behind Italy; individually she won gold on floor exercise, tied with Flávia Saraiva and Manila Esposito. At the Brazil Trophy she won silver on balance beam.

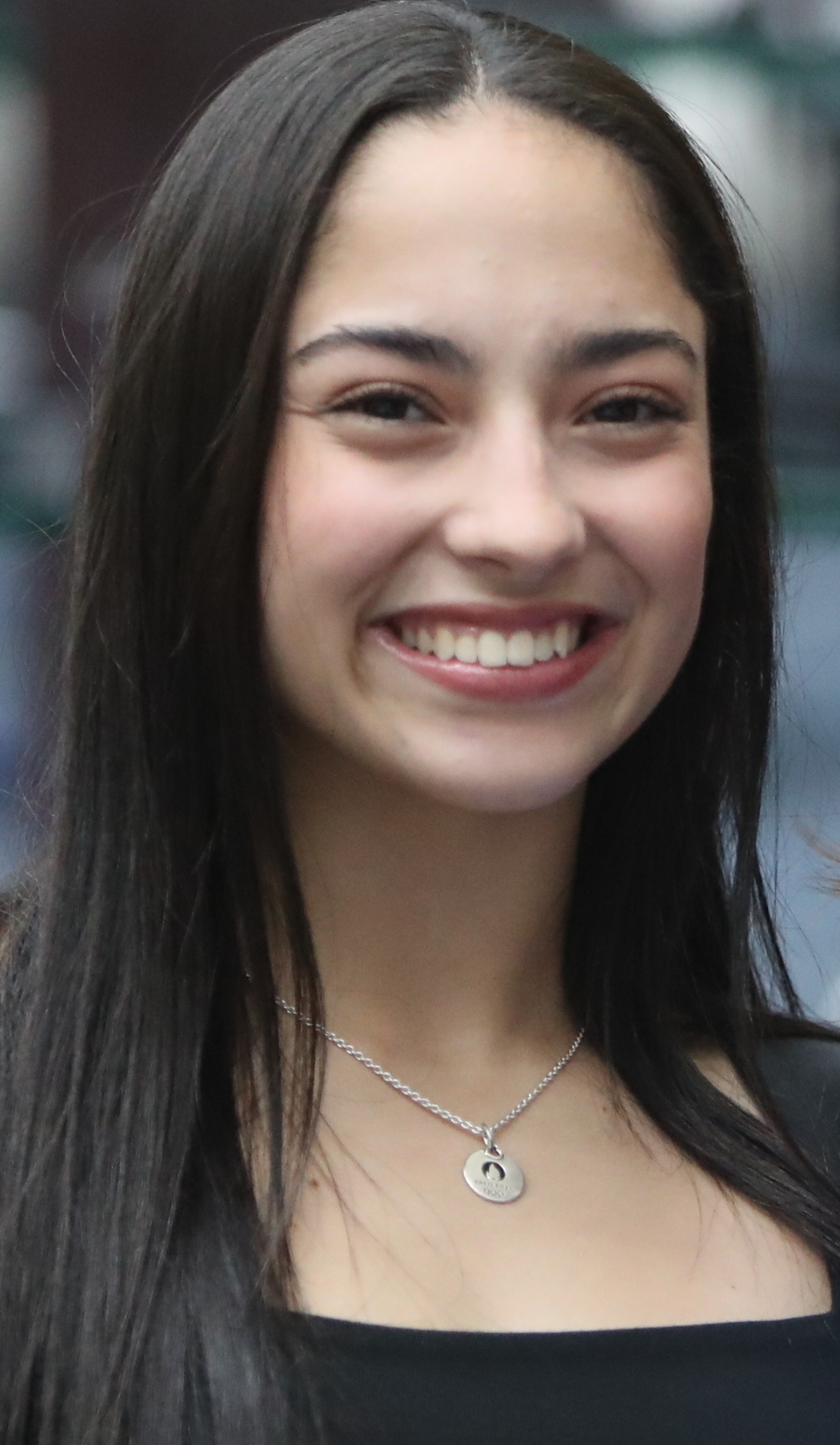
Soares in October 2024

Soares was selected to represent Brazil at the 2024 Olympic Games alongside Rebeca Andrade, Flávia Saraiva, Lorrane Oliveira, and Jade Barbosa. During the qualification round Soares competed on balance beam and floor exercise, helping Brazil qualify to the team final. Individually, she qualified to the balance beam final and was the second reserve for the floor exercise final. During the team final she competed once again on balance beam and floor exercise, helping Brazil win the bronze medal, their first Olympic team medal in history. During the balance beam final Soares fell off the apparatus and finished seventh.

After the Olympic Games, Soares competed at the Brazilian Championships where she placed first. She finished out the year competing at the Arthur Gander Memorial, where she placed third behind Kaylia Nemour and Karina Schönmaier, and the Swiss Cup where she was partnered with Caio Souza. The pair finished the competition in fourth place.

=== 2025 ===
In September, Soares competed at the Szombathely World Challenge Cup, performing on balance beam and floor exercise. She qualified for both finals and won the silver medal on floor.

Soares represented Brazil at the 2025 World Gymnastics Championships in Jakarta, Indonesia, along with teammates Flávia Saraiva, Julia Coutinho, and Sophia Weisberg. Soares competed on balance beam and floor exercise during the qualification round, but did not advance to any finals.

== Eponymous skills ==
Soares has a balance beam mount named after her in the Code of Points.

| Apparatus | Name | Description | Difficulty (Note: Valid for the 2025–2028 Code of Points) | Added to Code of Points |
|---|---|---|---|---|
| Balance beam | Soares | From rear stand, flic flac with ½ turn (180°) to candle position, ending in front support | C (0.3) | 2021 Pan American Championships |

== Competitive history ==
Competitive history of Julia Soares at the junior level
| Year | Event | Team | AA | VT | UB | BB | FX |
|---|---|---|---|---|---|---|---|
| 2018 | City of Jesolo Trophy | 7 | 34 | | | | |
| 2018 | Brazilian Championships | | 1st place, gold medalist(s) | 3rd place, bronze medalist(s) | 2nd place, silver medalist(s) | 1st place, gold medalist(s) | |
| 2018 | Brazilian Event Championships | 2nd place, silver medalist(s) | | | 5 | 3rd place, bronze medalist(s) | 5 |
| 2018 | South American Junior Championships | 1st place, gold medalist(s) | | | 3rd place, bronze medalist(s) | 4 | 1st place, gold medalist(s) |
| 2018 | Brazilian Junior Championships | | 3rd place, bronze medalist(s) | 2nd place, silver medalist(s) | 2nd place, silver medalist(s) | 1st place, gold medalist(s) | 2nd place, silver medalist(s) |
| 2019 | WOGA Classic | | 7 | | | | |
| 2019 | Brazilian Event Championships | | 5 | | | 3rd place, bronze medalist(s) | 3rd place, bronze medalist(s) |
| 2019 | Junior World Championships | 7 | 15 | | | 7 | R1 |
| 2019 | Brazilian Championships | 1st place, gold medalist(s) | 1st place, gold medalist(s) | 3rd place, bronze medalist(s) | 2nd place, silver medalist(s) | 1st place, gold medalist(s) | 1st place, gold medalist(s) |
| 2019 | South American Junior Championships | 2nd place, silver medalist(s) | 3rd place, bronze medalist(s) | | | 2nd place, silver medalist(s) | 1st place, gold medalist(s) |
| 2019 | Brazilian Junior Championships | | 1st place, gold medalist(s) | | 1st place, gold medalist(s) | 1st place, gold medalist(s) | 1st place, gold medalist(s) |

Competitive history of Julia Soares at the senior level
| Year | Event | Team | AA | VT | UB | BB | FX |
2021
| 2021 | Pan American Championships | 1st place, gold medalist(s) | | | | 3rd place, bronze medalist(s) | |
| 2021 | Brazilian Championships | 2nd place, silver medalist(s) | 4 | | 6 | | 1st place, gold medalist(s) |
| 2021 | South American Championships | 1st place, gold medalist(s) | 1st place, gold medalist(s) | | 3rd place, bronze medalist(s) | 1st place, gold medalist(s) | 1st place, gold medalist(s) |
| 2022 | Baku World Cup | | | | | | 1st place, gold medalist(s) |
| 2022 | Gymnasiade | 4 | 6 | | | 7 | 6 |
| 2022 | Pan American Championships | 1st place, gold medalist(s) | | | | | 6 |
| 2022 | Brazilian Championships | 2nd place, silver medalist(s) | 3rd place, bronze medalist(s) | | 6 | 2nd place, silver medalist(s) | 3rd place, bronze medalist(s) |
| 2022 | South American Games | 1st place, gold medalist(s) | 1st place, gold medalist(s) | | | 1st place, gold medalist(s) | 1st place, gold medalist(s) |
| 2022 | World Championships | 4 | | | | | |
| 2023 | DTB Pokal Team Challenge | 9 | | | | 4 | 1st place, gold medalist(s) |
| 2023 | Brazil Trophy | | | | | 1st place, gold medalist(s) | 1st place, gold medalist(s) |
| 2023 | Pan American Championships | 5 | 7 | | 12 | 8 | 8 |
| 2023 | Brazilian Championships | 2nd place, silver medalist(s) | 2nd place, silver medalist(s) | | 6 | 3rd place, bronze medalist(s) | 2nd place, silver medalist(s) |
| 2023 | World Championships | 2nd place, silver medalist(s) | | | | | |
| 2023 | Pan American Games | 2nd place, silver medalist(s) | | | | | 4 |
| 2023 | Arthur Gander Memorial | | 1st place, gold medalist(s) | | | | |
| 2023 | Swiss Cup | 3rd place, bronze medalist(s) | | | | | |
| 2024 | Baku World Cup | | | | | 5 | |
| 2024 | City of Jesolo Trophy | 2nd place, silver medalist(s) | | | | | 1st place, gold medalist(s) |
| 2024 | Brazil Trophy | | | | | 2nd place, silver medalist(s) | 6 |
| 2024 | Olympic Games | 3rd place, bronze medalist(s) | | | | 7 | R2 |
| 2024 | Brazilian Championships | 2nd place, silver medalist(s) | 1st place, gold medalist(s) | | WD | WD | WD |
| 2024 | Arthur Gander Memorial | | 3rd place, bronze medalist(s) | | | | |
| 2024 | Swiss Cup | 4 | | | | | |
| 2025 | Brazilian Championships | 2nd place, silver medalist(s) | | | | 3rd place, bronze medalist(s) | 1st place, gold medalist(s) |
| 2025 | Szombathely World Challenge Cup | | | | | 6 | 2nd place, silver medalist(s) |
| 2025 | World Championships | | | | | 73 | 46 |
| 2026 | Osijek World Cup | | | | | | R1 |
| 2026 | Pan American Championships | 2nd place, silver medalist(s) | | | | 5 | |
