= Carolyne Pedro =

Brazilian artistic gymnast

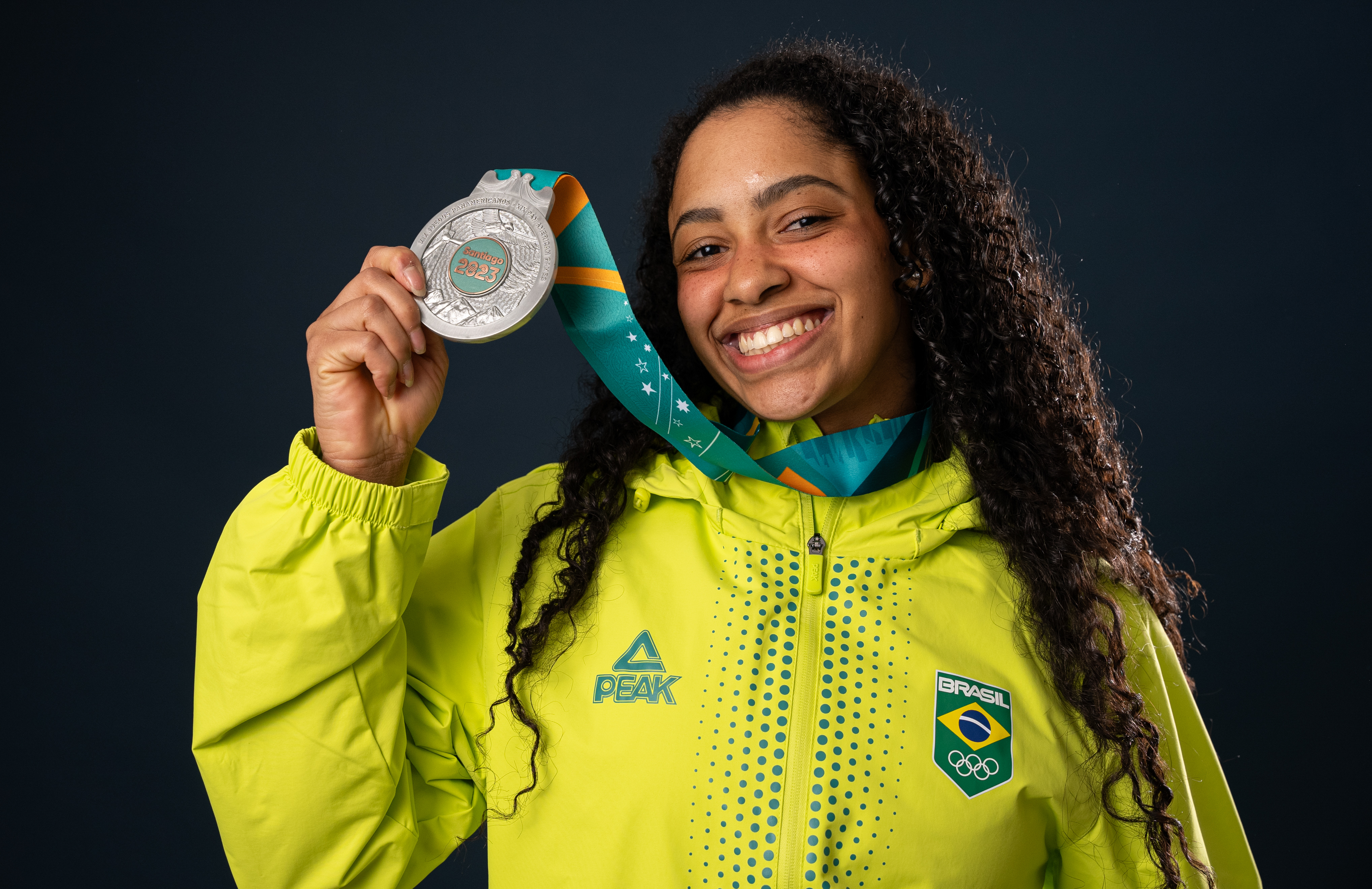
- Pedro at the 2023 Pan American Games

Personal information
- Full name: Carolyne Mercer Winche Pedro
- Born: 6 July 2000 (age 26) Curitiba, Brazil
- Height: 164 cm (5 ft 5 in)

Gymnastics career
- Discipline: Women's artistic gymnastics
- Country represented: Brazil; (2016 – present)
- Club: CEGIN
- Head coach: Irina Ilyashenko
Medal record
Women's artistic gymnastics
Representing Brazil
World Championships
Silver medal – second place	2023 Antwerp	Team
Pan American Games
Silver medal – second place	2023 Santiago	Team
Bronze medal – third place	2019 Lima	Team
Pan American Championships
Gold medal – first place	2022 Rio de Janeiro	Team
Gold medal – first place	2024 Santa Marta	Team
Bronze medal – third place	2017 Lima	Balance beam
South American Games
Gold medal – first place	2018 Cochabamba	Team
Gold medal – first place	2022 Asunción	Team
Gold medal – first place	2022 Asunción	Uneven bars
Silver medal – second place	2022 Asunción	All-around
Silver medal – second place	2022 Asunción	Floor exercise
Silver medal – second place	2026 Santa Fe	Team
South American Championships
Gold medal – first place	2017 Cochabamba	Team
Gold medal – first place	2017 Cochabamba	Vault
Gold medal – first place	2021 San Juan	Team
Gold medal – first place	2025 Medellín	Team
Silver medal – second place	2017 Cochabamba	Floor exercise
Silver medal – second place	2021 San Juan	Uneven bars
FIG World Cup
Event / 1st / 2nd / 3rd; World Challenge Cup / 0 / 0 / 1

Carolyne Mercer Winche Pedro (born 6 July 2000) is a Brazilian artistic gymnast and a member of the national team. She participated in the 2019 Pan American Games.

== Career ==
Pedro took part at the 2016 Gymnastics Olympic Test Event helping the Brazilian team qualify for the 2016 Olympic Games and earning the gold medal in the team all-around competition. She was named as the alternate to the 2016 Olympic team. She also earned the bronze medal on floor at the São Paulo stage of the 2016 FIG Artistic Gymnastics World Cup series.

In 2017 she earned three medals at the 2007 South American Artistic Gymnastics Championships and earned a bronze medal on the balance beam at the 2017 Pan American Individual Event Artistic Gymnastics Championships. In 2018 she helped the Brazilian team earn the gold medal at the 2018 South American Games. In 2019 she was part of the bronze-medal winning team at the 2019 Pan American Games, qualifying for the uneven bars final.

== Competition history ==
Year	Event	Team	AA	VT	UB	BB	FX
Junior
2013	Stella Zakharova Cup	4	13			5	
2013	Mexican International Junior Cup	2nd place, silver medalist(s)					
2014	Brazilian Championships		3rd place, bronze medalist(s)				
2015	Brazilian Championships		1st place, gold medalist(s)		4		3rd place, bronze medalist(s)
Senior
2016	Houston National Invitational		3rd place, bronze medalist(s)	3rd place, bronze medalist(s)	3rd place, bronze medalist(s)	5	4
2016	City of Jesolo Trophy	2nd place, silver medalist(s)	15				6
2016	Olympic Test Event	1st place, gold medalist(s)					
2016	Osijek World Challenge Cup				6	7	6
2016	São Paulo World Challenge Cup						3rd place, bronze medalist(s)
2016	Dutch Olympic Qualifier		7				
2016	Gymnasiade		4				
2016	Brazilian Championships	2nd place, silver medalist(s)	2nd place, silver medalist(s)		6	3rd place, bronze medalist(s)	6
2016	Mexican Open		2nd place, silver medalist(s)	4	1st place, gold medalist(s)	5	3rd place, bronze medalist(s)
2017	City of Jesolo Trophy	2nd place, silver medalist(s)	21				
2017	Brazilian Selection		1st place, gold medalist(s)				
2017	Brazilian Championships		6	3rd place, bronze medalist(s)			
2017	Pan American Championships					3rd place, bronze medalist(s)	5
2017	Brazilian Event Championships			3rd place, bronze medalist(s)	2nd place, silver medalist(s)	3rd place, bronze medalist(s)	
2017	South American Championships	1st place, gold medalist(s)	6	1st place, gold medalist(s)			2nd place, silver medalist(s)
2018	City of Jesolo Trophy	2nd place, silver medalist(s)	11				6
2018	South American Games	1st place, gold medalist(s)	5	6			
2018	Brazilian Championships		6	3rd place, bronze medalist(s)	3rd place, bronze medalist(s)		
2018	Brazilian Event Championships	2nd place, silver medalist(s)			3rd place, bronze medalist(s)		
2019	DTB Team Challenge	1st place, gold medalist(s)					
2019	Stuttgart World Cup		9				
2019	Tokyo World Cup		5				
2019	Brazilian Event Championships		6		4		
2019	Pan American Games	3rd place, bronze medalist(s)			7		
2019	Brazilian Championships		2nd place, silver medalist(s)	2nd place, silver medalist(s)	1st place, gold medalist(s)	7	4
2021	Brazilian Championships				4		
2021	South American Championships	1st place, gold medalist(s)			2nd place, silver medalist(s)		
2022	Baku World Cup				5		
2022	Brazil Trophy				3rd place, bronze medalist(s)	5	3rd place, bronze medalist(s)
2022	Pan American Championships	1st place, gold medalist(s)	10				
2022	Brazilian Championships	2nd place, silver medalist(s)	4		4	5	8
2022	South American Games	1st place, gold medalist(s)	2nd place, silver medalist(s)		1st place, gold medalist(s)		2nd place, silver medalist(s)
2022	World Championships	4					
2023	DTB Pokal Team Challenge	9					
2023	DTB Pokal Mixed Cup	3rd place, bronze medalist(s)					
2023	Brazil Trophy				2nd place, silver medalist(s)		
2023	Pan American Championships	5	6		9	7	12
2023	Brazilian Championships	2nd place, silver medalist(s)			4	14	
2023	World Championships	2nd place, silver medalist(s)					
2023	Pan American Games	2nd place, silver medalist(s)					
2024	City of Jesolo Trophy	2nd place, silver medalist(s)	26				
2024	Pan American Championships	1st place, gold medalist(s)					
2024	Brazil Trophy				3rd place, bronze medalist(s)		3rd place, bronze medalist(s)
2024	Brazilian Championships	2nd place, silver medalist(s)			4		
2025	Brazilian Championships		4	4	8	R1	WD
2025	South American Championships	1st place, gold medalist(s)	8	WD	6		
2026	Koper World Challenge Cup				8		
2026	South American Games	2nd place, silver medalist(s)					
