= Israel Chiriboga =

Ecuadorian artistic gymnast (born 1998)

- Born: 1998 (age 27–28)

Gymnastics career
- Discipline: Men's artistic gymnastics
- Country represented: Ecuador
Medal record
Representing Ecuador
Men's artistic gymnastics
South American Championships
Bronze medal – third place	2024 Aracaju	Horizontal bar

Israel Chiriboga (born 1998) is an Ecuadorian artistic gymnast.

In 2017, he competed at the 2017 South American Artistic Gymnastics Championships held in Cochabamba, Bolivia.

In 2018, he won the silver medal in the men's horizontal bar event at the 2018 Pacific Rim Gymnastics Championships held in Medellín, Colombia.
