= Pan American Artistic Gymnastics Championships – Women's team all-around =

Gymnastics Championships first held in 1997

The Pan American Gymnastics Championships were first held in 1997.

Three medals are awarded: gold for first place, silver for second place, and bronze for third place.

== Medalists ==
Year	Location	Gold	Silver	Bronze	Ref
1997	(Colombia) Medellín	Brazil; Daniele Hypólito; Mariana Gonçalves; Camila Comin; Marilia Gomes	United States; Erinn Dooley; Nicole Kilpatrick; Raegan Tomasek; Morgan White	Cuba; Leyanet González	
2001	(Mexico) Cancún	United States; Tasha Schwikert; Mohini Bhardwaj; Tabitha Yim; Katie Heenan	Brazil; Daiane dos Santos; Daniele Hypólito; Camila Comin; Heine Araújo	Cuba; Janerki de la Peña; Leyanet Gonzalez; Yumaili Aguilar; Mónica La Rosa	
2005	(Brazil) Rio de Janeiro	United States; Chellsie Memmel; Alicia Sacramone; Jana Bieger; Bianca Flohr	Brazil; Daniele Hypólito; Laís Souza; Camila Comin; Jade Barbosa	Canada; Alyssa Brown; Aisha Gerber; Brittnee Habbib; Rebecca Simbhudas	
2010	(Mexico) Guadalajara	United States; Gabby Douglas; Brenna Dowell; Kyla Ross; Sarah Finnegan; Sabrina Vega; McKayla Maroney	Canada; Bianca Dancose-Giambattisto; Coralie Leblond-Chartrand; Charlotte Mackie; Dominique Pegg; Jessica Savona; Kristina Vaculik	Brazil; Priscila Cobello; Ethiene Franco; Gabriela Soares; Bruna Leal; Daniele Hypólito; Adrian Gomes	
2014	(Canada) Mississauga	United States; MyKayla Skinner; Maggie Nichols; Madison Desch; Amelia Hundley; Madison Kocian; Ashton Locklear	Brazil; Julie Sinmon; Letícia Costa; Daniele Hypólito; Isabelle Cruz; Mariana Oliveira; Maria Cecília Cruz	Mexico; Alexa Moreno; Elsa García; Karla Torres; Karla Retiz; Ahtziri Sandoval; Miriana Almeida	
2018	(Peru) Lima	United States; Jade Carey; Kara Eaker; Shilese Jones; Grace McCallum; Trinity Thomas	Brazil; Rebeca Andrade; Jade Barbosa; Thaís Fidélis; Lorrane Oliveira; Flávia Saraiva	Mexico; Paulina Campos; Nicolle Castro; Natalia Escalera; Frida Esparza; Alexa Moreno	
2021	(Brazil) Rio de Janeiro	Brazil; Rebeca Andrade; Christal Bezerra; Ana Luiza Lima; Lorrane Oliveira; Júlia Soares	Mexico; Daniela Briceño; Paulina Campos; Natalia Escalera; Victoria Mata; Cinthia Ruiz	Argentina; Brisa Carraro; Luna Fernández; Abigail Magistrati; Rocio Saucedo	
2022	(Brazil) Rio de Janeiro	Brazil; Rebeca Andrade; Lorrane Oliveira; Carolyne Pedro; Flávia Saraiva; Júlia Soares	United States; Skye Blakely; Kayla DiCello; Zoe Miller; Elle Mueller; Lexi Zeiss	Canada; Shallon Olsen; Denelle Pedrick; Ava Stewart; Sydney Turner; Rose-Kaying Woo	
2023	(Colombia) Medellín	United States; Addison Fatta; Madray Johnson; Nola Matthews; Zoe Miller; Joscelyn Roberson; Tiana Sumanasekera	Mexico; Greys Briceño; Paulina Campos; Natalia Escalera; Cassandra Loustalot; Alexa Moreno; Ahtziri Sandoval	Canada; Jenna Lalonde; Cassie Lee; Frédérique Sgarbossa; Aurélie Tran; Sydney Turner; Evandra Zlobec	
2024	(Colombia) Santa Marta	Brazil; Luiza Abel; Gabriela Barbosa; Andreza Lima; Carolyne Pedro; Hellen Vitória Silva; Josiany Calixto	Canada; Denelle Pedrick; Tegan Shaver; Sydney Turner; Emma Spence	Mexico; Regina Peña; Michelle Pineda; Alondra Rodriguez; Mariangela Valdez; Valentina Valdez	
2025	Panama City	United States; Dulcy Caylor; Jayla Hang; Gabrielle Hardie; Hezly Rivera; Tiana Sumanasekera; Alessia Rosa	Canada; Gabrielle Black; Lia Monica Fontaine; Alyssa Gurrier-Calixte; Lia Redick; Evandra Zlobec	Brazil; Luiza Abel; Gabriela Barbosa; Júlia Coutinho; Thaís Fidélis; Rebeca Procópio	
2026	(Brazil) Rio de Janeiro	United States; Charleigh Bullock; Claire Pease; Hezly Rivera; Alessia Rosa; Simone Rose; Lila Richardson	Brazil; Rebeca Andrade; Gabriela Bouças; Thaís Fidélis; Julia Soares; Sophia Weisberg; Gabriela Barbosa	Canada; Gabrielle Black; Lia Monica Fontaine; Alyssa Guerrier-Calixte; Lia Redick; Aurélie Tran; Victoriane Charron	

== Medal table ==
Rank	Nation	Gold	Silver	Bronze	Total
1	United States (USA)	8	2	0	10
2	Brazil (BRA)	4	5	2	11
3	Canada (CAN)	0	3	4	7
4	Mexico (MEX)	0	2	3	5
5	Cuba (CUB)	0	0	2	2
6	Argentina (ARG)	0	0	1	1
Totals (6 entries)		12	12	12	36
