= Pan American Artistic Gymnastics Championships – Women's balance beam =

The Pan American Gymnastics Championships were first held in 1997.

Three medals are awarded: gold for first place, silver for second place, and bronze for third place.

== Medalists ==
Year	Location	Gold	Silver	Bronze	Ref
1997	(Colombia) Medellín	(United States) Raegan Tomasek	(Mexico) Denisse López	(Cuba) Leyanet González	
2001	(Mexico) Cancún	(United States) Tabitha Yim	(United States) Tasha Schwikert	(Brazil) Camila Comin	
2004	(Venezuela) Maracaibo	(United States) Chellsie Memmel	(United States) Natasha Kelley	(Argentina) Celeste Andrea Carnevale	
2005	(Brazil) Rio de Janeiro	(United States) Chellsie Memmel	(United States) Bianca Flohr	(Canada) Alyssa Brown	
2008	(Argentina) Rosario	(United States) Samantha Shapiro	(United States) Corrie Lothrop	(Mexico) Yessenia Estrada	
2010	(Mexico) Guadalajara	(United States) Sabrina Vega	(Venezuela) Jessica López	(United States) Sarah Finnegan	
2012	(Colombia) Medellín	(Brazil) Daniele Hypólito	(Brazil) Adrian Gomes	(Chile) Simona Castro	
2013	(Puerto Rico) San Juan	(Guatemala) Ana Sofía Gómez	(Venezuela) Jessica López	(Cuba) Dovélis Torres	
2014	(Canada) Mississauga	(Guatemala) Ana Sofía Gómez	(Venezuela) Jessica López	(Brazil) Julie Sinmon	
2016	(Bolivia) Sucre	(Brazil) Milena Theodoro	(Canada) Meaghan Ruttan	(Mexico) Nicolle Castro	
2017	(Peru) Lima	(Canada) Sophie Marois	(Argentina) Agustina Pisos	(Brazil) Carolyne Pedro	
2018	(Peru) Lima	(United States) Kara Eaker	(Brazil) Flávia Saraiva	(United States) Grace McCallum	
2021	(Brazil) Rio de Janeiro	(Costa Rica) Luciana Alvarado	(Mexico) Paulina Campos	(Brazil) Júlia Soares	
2022	(Brazil) Rio de Janeiro	(Brazil) Flávia Saraiva	(Brazil) Rebeca Andrade	(United States) Lexi Zeiss	
2023	(Colombia) Medellín	(United States) Tiana Sumanasekera	(United States) Joscelyn Roberson	(Canada) Aurélie Tran	
2024	(Colombia) Santa Marta	(Mexico) Michelle Pineda	(Brazil) Andreza Lima	(Canada) Sydney Turner	
2025	Panama City	(Canada) Lia Redick	(United States) Jayla Hang	(United States) Hezly Rivera	
2026	(Brazil) Rio de Janeiro	(Argentina) Isabella Ajalla	(United States) Simone Rose	(Brazil) Thaís Fidélis	

== Medal table ==
Rank	Nation	Gold	Silver	Bronze	Total
1	United States (USA)	8	7	4	19
2	Brazil (BRA)	3	4	5	12
3	Canada (CAN)	2	1	3	6
4	Guatemala (GUA)	2	0	0	2
5	Mexico (MEX)	1	2	2	5
6	Argentina (ARG)	1	1	1	3
7	Costa Rica (CRC)	1	0	0	1
8	Venezuela (VEN)	0	3	0	3
9	Cuba (CUB)	0	0	2	2
10	Chile (CHI)	0	0	1	1
Totals (10 entries)		18	18	18	54
