= Alaís Perea =

Ecuadorian artistic gymnast (born 2004)

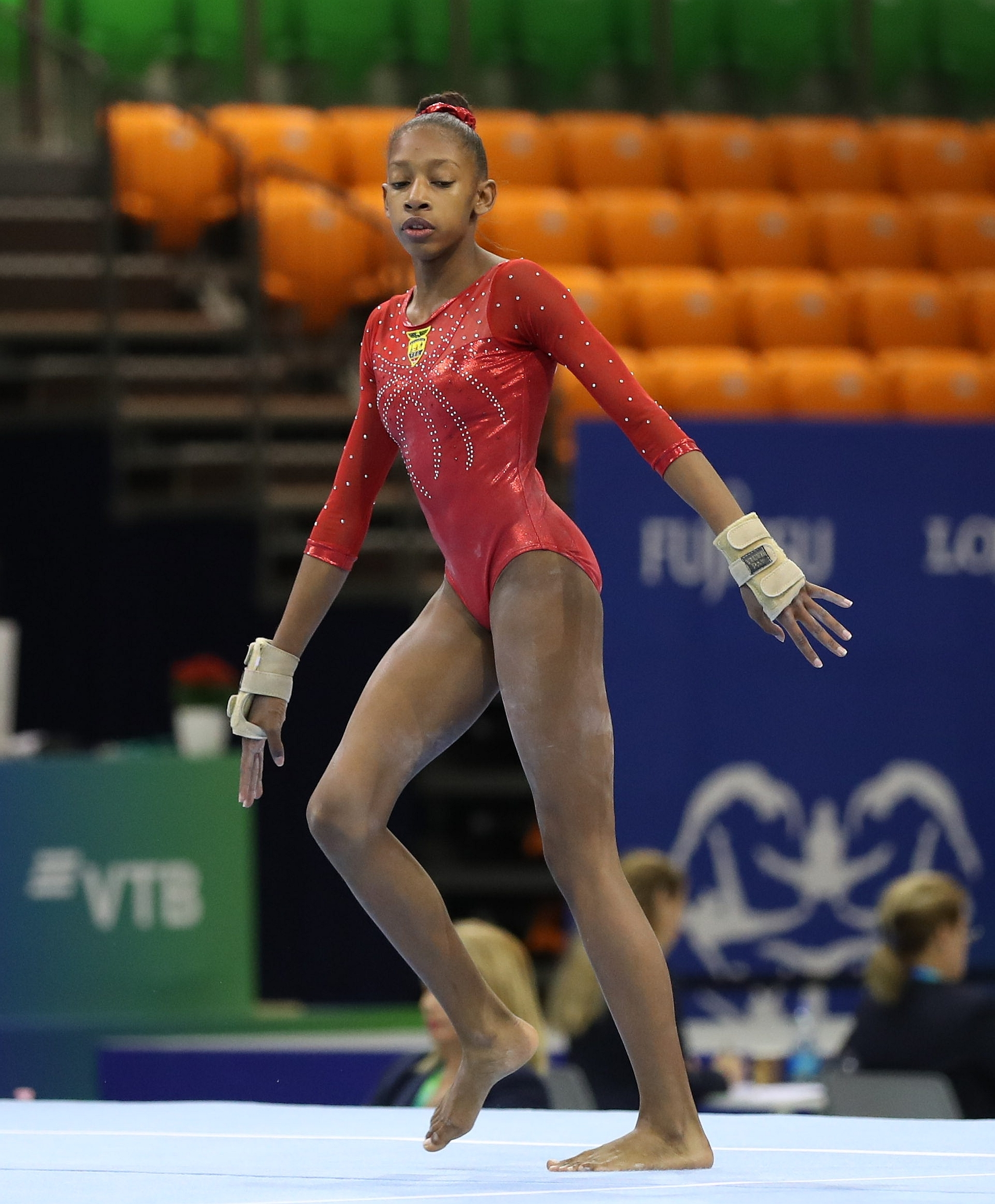
- Perea at the 2019 Junior World Championships

Personal information
- Full name: Alaís Natasha Perea Ponce
- Born: 13 December 2004 (age 21) Guayaquil, Ecuador

Gymnastics career
- Country represented: Ecuador (2018–present)
- Former coach: Rosendo Verdesoto
Medal record
Representing Ecuador
Pan American Championships
Bronze medal – third place	2021 Rio de Janeiro	Vault
South American Championships
Silver medal – second place	2021 San Juan	Balance beam
Silver medal – second place	2024 Aracaju	Balance beam
Silver medal – second place	2025 Medellín	All-around
Silver medal – second place	2025 Medellín	Floor exercise
Bronze medal – third place	2021 San Juan	Vault
Bronze medal – third place	2024 Aracaju	Uneven bars
Bronze medal – third place	2024 Aracaju	Vault
Bronze medal – third place	2025 Medellín	Vault
Bolivarian Games
Gold medal – first place	2022 Valledupar	Balance Beam
Gold medal – first place	2025 Lima	Uneven bars
Silver medal – second place	2022 Valledupar	All-around
Silver medal – second place	2025 Lima	All-around

Alaís Natasha Perea Ponce (born 13 December 2004) is an Ecuadorian artistic gymnast. She is the 2021 Pan American bronze medalist on vault.

== Early life ==
Perea was born in Cristo del Consuelo, a barrio in south Guayaquil, and grew up in a humble home. She started training in gymnastics at age seven, riding on her father's bike every morning to train at a gym next to the Estadio Modelo, and idolized Simone Biles.

== Junior gymnastics career ==
Perea made her international debut at the 2018 South American Junior Championships. She finished sixth in the all-around and seventh in both the balance beam and floor exercise.

Perea was selected to compete at the inaugural Junior World Championships, which were held in Hungary in June 2019, as Ecuador's lone representative; she placed 61st in the all-around. She ended the season by placing second in the all-around at the 2019 South American Junior Championships in October. During event finals, she finished first in balance beam, second in floor exercise, third in vault, and seventh in uneven bars.

Most competitions were canceled or postponed in 2020 due to the global COVID-19 pandemic.

== Senior gymnastics career ==
=== 2021 ===
Perea became age-eligible for senior competition in December 2020. She made her senior international debut at the 2021 Pan American Championships, where she won the bronze medal on vault and placed fifth on floor exercise while finishing 14th in the all-around. Perea next competed at the World Championships, where she finished 29th in the all-around during the qualification round but did not advance into any finals. She ended the season competing at the South American Championships, where she placed 14th in the all-around and won silver on the balance beam and bronze on the vault, in addition to placing fourth on the floor exercise.

=== 2022 ===
Perea won the all-around silver medal at the Bolivarian Games with an total score of 48.100, winning the balance beam title and finishing fourth on floor exercise, sixth on vault, and seventh on uneven bars. She commented that she was very nervous before her balance beam routine due to an aversion to performing first, preferring instead to perform in the middle or end of the order in finals. The following month, Perea competed at the Pan American Championships and placed 18th in the all-around. In October, she finished 15th in the all-around at the South American Games. Perea qualified for the floor exercise final and placed seventh. She ended the season competing at the World Championships, where she finished 76th in the all-around during the qualification round.

=== 2023 ===
In May, Perea competed at the Pan American Championships and finished 14th in the all-around; she placed 14th on balance beam, 15th on uneven bars, and 22nd on floor exercise. She also competed alongside Ashley Bohórquez, Analía Calderón, and Fabiana Sadun in the team event. Perea helped Ecuador finish 10th of 18 teams in the qualification round. In September, she placed 36th in the all-around at the South American Championships. Perea next competed at the World Championships, where she finished 96th in the all-around during the qualification round. She ended the season competing at the Pan American Games, where she finished 14th in the all-around.

=== 2024 ===
Perea debuted on the FIG World Cup circuit in February, competing at both the Cairo World Cup and Cottbus World Cup. However, she did not advance into any finals. In May, Perea finished ninth in the all-around and helped Ecuador place seventh as a team alongside Bohórquez and Sadun at the Pan American Championships. During event finals, she placed sixth on the balance beam and vault. Perea ended the season competing at the South American Championships. She won the silver medal on the balance beam and bronze on the uneven bars and vault, and placed eighth on the floor exercise. Perea finished fifth in the all-around and helped Ecuador finish eighth as a team alongside Bohórquez and Nicole Llugcha.

=== 2025 ===
Perea began her season competing at the Pan American Championships. She placed 13th in the all-around and helped Ecuador place eighth as a team alongside Bohórquez, Sadun, and Melina Tripul. In November, Perea won the all-around silver medal at the South American Championships with a total score of 50.750; during event finals, she placed second on the floor exercise, third on the vault, and fourth on the balance beam and uneven bars. Additionally, she helped Ecuador finish fourth as a team alongside Bohórquez, Sadun, Mariyah Aranbayev, and Valentina Azevedo. That same month, Perea won the all-around silver medal at the Bolivarian Games with a total score of 49.865. During event finals, she placed first on the uneven bars, fourth on the floor exercise, and eighth on the vault.

== Competitive history ==
Competitive history of Alaís Perea
Year	Event	Team	AA	VT	UB	BB	FX
2018	Junior South American Championships	4	6		5	7	7
2019
2019	Junior World Championships		61				
2019	Junior South American Championships		2nd place, silver medalist(s)	3rd place, bronze medalist(s)	7	1st place, gold medalist(s)	2nd place, silver medalist(s)
2021
2021	Pan American Championships		14	3rd place, bronze medalist(s)			5
2021	World Championships		29				
2021	South American Championships		14	3rd place, bronze medalist(s)		2nd place, silver medalist(s)	4
2022	Bolivarian Games		2nd place, silver medalist(s)	6	7	2nd place, silver medalist(s)	4
2022	Pan American Championships		18				
2022	South American Games		15				7
2022	World Championships		76				
2023
2023	Pan American Championships	10	14				
2023	World Championships		96				
2023	Pan American Games		14				
2024
2024	Pan American Championships	7	9	6		6	
2024	South American Championships	8	5	3rd place, bronze medalist(s)	3rd place, bronze medalist(s)	2nd place, silver medalist(s)	8
2025
2025	Pan American Championships	8	13				
2025	South American Championships	4	2nd place, silver medalist(s)	3rd place, bronze medalist(s)	4	4	2nd place, silver medalist(s)
2025	Bolivarian Games		2nd place, silver medalist(s)	8	1st place, gold medalist(s)		4
2026
2026	Pan American Championships	8	19				
