= Adam Lakomy =

American artistic gymnast

- Full name: Adam Frank Lakomy
- Born: November 13, 2006 (age 19) Summit, New Jersey, U.S.
- Relatives: Ivona Krmelová (mother)

Gymnastics career
- Discipline: Men's artistic gymnastics
- Country represented: Czech Republic; (2026–present)
- Former countries represented: United States (2023–2024)
- College team: Michigan Wolverines (2026–present)
- Club: Sunburst Gymnastics
- Head coach: Yuan Xiao

Adam Frank Lakomy (born November 13, 2006) is an American artistic gymnast. He is currently representing the Czech Republic in international competition. He previously represented the United States until 2026, where he was the 2024 Junior Pan American champion.

== Early life and education ==
Lakomy was born on November 13, 2006, and is the son of former gymnasts Pavel Lakomy and Ivona Krmelová. His father competed at the 1995 World Championships, while his mother competed at the 1988 Summer Olympics. He was raised in Roselle Park, New Jersey, and attended Roselle Park High School where he was a four-time New Jersey state champion.

== Gymnastics career ==
=== Representing the United States: 2024–2025 ===
In February, Lakomy competed at the 2024 Winter Cup, where he won silver on still rings, placed fourth on horizontal bars, and fifth in the all-around and floor exercise. As a result, he was named to the team to compete at the 2024 DTB Pokal Team Challenge. At the event, he helped team USA win gold as a team. He also won gold on still rings and bronze on vault and horizontal bar. In May, he competed at the 2024 Junior Pan American Championships, where he helped team USA win team gold. He also won gold in the individual all-around and bronze on still rings and parallel bars.

In early 2025, he competed at the 2025 Winter Cup where he won gold in the all-around, floor exercise and horizontal bar. In July of that year, Lakomy announced on Instagram that he had torn his labrum and underwent surgery to repair it.

=== Representing the Czech Republic: 2026–present ===
In May 2026, Lakomy's nationality switch was approved and he began representing the Czech Republic.

== Competitive history ==
Competitive history of Adam Lakomy
| Year | Event | Team | AA | FX | PH | SR | VT | PB | HB |
|---|---|---|---|---|---|---|---|---|---|
| 2023 | Winter Cup | | | | | 3rd place, bronze medalist(s) | | | |
| 2023 | U.S. National Championships (U17) | | 4 | 4 | 6 | 2nd place, silver medalist(s) | 8 | 22 | 4 |
| 2024 | Winter Cup | | 5 | | | 1st place, gold medalist(s) | 5 | | 4 |
| 2024 | DTB Pokal Team Challenge | 1st place, gold medalist(s) | | | 1st place, gold medalist(s) | | 3rd place, bronze medalist(s) | | 3rd place, bronze medalist(s) |
| 2024 | Pan American Championships | 1st place, gold medalist(s) | 1st place, gold medalist(s) | | | 3rd place, bronze medalist(s) | 8 | 3rd place, bronze medalist(s) | 5 |
| 2025 | Winter Cup | | 1st place, gold medalist(s) | 1st place, gold medalist(s) | | | 5 | | 1st place, gold medalist(s) |
2026
| 2026 | European Championships | 20 | 34 | | | | | | |
