= 2024 South American Artistic Gymnastics Championships =

The 2024 South American Artistic Gymnastics Championships was held in Aracaju, Brazil, from October 18 to 20, 2024. The competition was organized by the Brazilian Gymnastics Federation and approved by the International Gymnastics Federation.

== Medalists ==
Event	Gold	Silver	Bronze
Men
Team all-around	Brazil; Bernardo Actos; Lucas Bitencourt; Tomás Florêncio; Johnny Oshiro; Patrick Sampaio; Leonardo Souza	Argentina; Ivo Chiapponi; Julian Inguanti; Julian Jato; Santiago Mayol; Nahuel Pardo; Daniel Villafañe	Chile; Joaquin Álvarez; Pablo Figueroa; Luciano Flores; Agustín Lira; Tomas López; Ignacio Varas
Individual all-around	Bernardo Actos (BRA)	Tomás Florêncio (BRA)	Santiago Mayol (ARG)
Floor exercise	Bernardo Actos (BRA)	Joel Álvarez (CHI)	Ivo Chiapponi (ARG)
Pommel horse	Santiago Mayol (ARG) Johnny Oshiro (BRA)	—N/a	Pablo Calvache (ECU)
Rings	Daniel Villafañe (ARG)	Edward Alarcón (PER)	Julian Inguanti (ARG) Joel Álvarez (CHI)
Vault	Tomás Florêncio (BRA)	Ignacio Varas (CHI)	Daniel Villafañe (ARG) Edward Gonzales (PER)
Parallel bars	Jesus Moreto (PER)	Tomás Florêncio (BRA)	Israel Chiriboga (ECU)
Horizontal bar	Tomás Florêncio (BRA)	Patrick Sampaio (BRA)	Santiago Mayol (ARG)
Women
Team all-around	Brazil; Gabriela Barbosa; Josiany Calixto; Beatriz Lima; Maria Heloísa Moreno; Rafaela Oliva; Hellen Silva	Argentina; Martina Abrahantes; Milagros Curti; Lucia Gonzalez; Sira Macias; Mia Mainardi; Meline Mesropian	Panama; Valentina Brostella; Victoria Castro; Hillary Heron; Lana Herrera; Karla Navas; Tatiana Tapia
Individual all-around	Milagros Curti (ARG)	Hillary Heron (PAN)	Maria Heloísa Moreno (BRA)
Vault	Karla Navas (PAN)	Lucia Gonzalez (ARG)	Alais Perea (ECU)
Uneven bars	Sira Macias (ARG)	Karla Navas (PAN)	Alais Perea (ECU)
Balance beam	Maria Heloísa Moreno (BRA)	Alais Perea (ECU)	Milagros Curti (ARG)
Floor exercise	Hellen Silva (BRA)	Maria Heloísa Moreno (BRA)	Milagros Curti (ARG)

== Participating nations ==
- Argentina
- Bolivia
- Brazil
- Chile
- Colombia
- Ecuador
- Panama
- Peru
- Venezuela

== Medal table ==
Rank	Nation	Gold	Silver	Bronze	Total
1	Brazil (BRA)	9	4	1	14
2	Argentina (ARG)	4	3	7	14
3	Panama (PAN)	1	2	1	4
4	Peru (PER)	1	1	1	3
5	Chile (CHI)	0	2	2	4
6	Ecuador (ECU)	0	1	4	5
Totals (6 entries)		15	13	16	44

== See also ==
- 2024 Pan American Artistic Gymnastics Championships
