= Gymnastics at the 2022 South American Youth Games =

Gymnastics competitions at the 2022 South American Youth Games

- Dates: April 28–May 2

Gymnastics competitions at the 2022 South American Youth Games in Rosario, Argentina were held from April 28 to May 2, 2022.

== Medal summary ==
=== Medal table ===
* Host nation (Host nation)

Rank	Nation	Gold	Silver	Bronze	Total
1	Colombia (COL)	7	2	4	13
2	Argentina (ARG)*	5	3	6	14
3	Brazil (BRA)	2	6	4	12
4	Chile (CHI)	0	2	1	3
5	Ecuador (ECU)	0	1	0	1
Totals (5 entries)		14	14	15	43

== Medalists ==
=== Boys ===
Event	Gold	Silver	Bronze
Team all-around	Colombia; Ángel Barajas; Jordan Castro; Manuel López; Carlos Orozco; Yan Zabala	Brazil; Bernardo Ferreira; Rafael Pamplona; João Victor Perdigão; Rafael Shiguti; Guilherme Silva	Argentina; Matias Coralizzi; Fausto Latella; Thiago Ognibene; Nahuél Pardo; Joaquin Vélez
Individual all-around	Ángel Barajas; Colombia	João Victor Perdigão; Brazil	Manuel López; Colombia
Floor exercise	Ángel Barajas; Colombia	Fausto Latella; Argentina	Manuel López; Colombia
Pommel horse	Ángel Barajas; Colombia	Diego Espejo; Chile	Thiago Ognibene; Argentina
Rings	João Victor Perdigão; Brazil	Manuel López; Colombia	Nahuel Pardo; Argentina
Vault	Ángel Barajas; Colombia	Daniel Chica; Ecuador	João Victor Perdigão; Brazil
Parallel bars	Ángel Barajas; Colombia	Diego Espejo; Chile	Yan Zabala; Colombia
Horizontal bar	Ángel Barajas; Colombia	Manuel López; Colombia	Cristobal Cuevas; Chile
Horizontal bar	Ángel Barajas; Colombia	Manuel López; Colombia	Fausto Latella; Argentina

=== Girls ===
Event	Gold	Silver	Bronze
Team all-around	Brazil; Gabriela Barbosa; Helen Benevides; Josiany Calixto; Andreza Lima; Maria Moreno	Argentina; Isabella Ajalla; Mia Corrente; Nicole Iribarne; Mía Mainardi; Tiziana Olivetto	Colombia; Mariana Agudelo; Jimena Alzate; Ana Espinoza; Jireth Gonzalez; Angeline Miranda
Individual all-around	Mía Mainardi; Argentina	Gabriela Barbosa; Brazil	Isabella Ajalla; Argentina
Vault	Mía Mainardi; Argentina	Nicole Iribarne; Argentina	Andreza Lima; Brazil
Uneven bars	Isabella Ajalla; Argentina	Gabriela Barbosa; Brazil	Josiany Calixto; Brazil
Balance beam	Isabella Ajalla; Argentina	Andreza Lima; Brazil	Gabriela Barbosa; Brazil
Floor exercise	Mía Mainardi; Argentina	Andreza Lima; Brazil	Isabella Ajalla; Argentina

== See also ==
- 2022 South American Artistic Gymnastics Championships
