= Andreza Lima =

Brazilian artistic gymnast

- Full name: Andreza Heloisa Lima de Lima
- Born: 22 May 2007 (age 19) Brazil

Gymnastics career
- Discipline: Women's artistic gymnastics
- Country represented: Brazil
Medal record
Representing Brazil
Pan American Championships
Gold medal – first place	2024 Santa Marta	Team
Silver medal – second place	2024 Santa Marta	Balance Beam
Bronze medal – third place	2024 Santa Marta	All-around
South American Championships
Gold medal – first place	2023 Cali	Team
Silver medal – second place	2023 Cali	Vault
Junior Pan American Games
Silver medal – second place	2021 Cali	Team
Bronze medal – third place	2021 Cali	Vault
Bronze medal – third place	2021 Cali	Balance beam

Andreza Heloisa Lima de Lima (born 22 May 2007) is a Brazilian senior artistic gymnast. She was the 2024 Pan American senior all around bronze medallist.

== Career ==
2019

Lima competed at the 2019 Brazilian Junior Championships, where she won the bronze in the 12-years all around with a score of 47.750. She also won silver in the beam final, bronze in the vault final, and placed fourth in the bars final.

2021

Lima placed first in the all around at the Brazilian Junior Championships with a score of 50.633. She also won gold in the vault and floor finals, and silver on the uneven bars and balance beam. At the Junior Pan American Games she earned bronze medals on floor and beam.

2022

Lima earned silver in the balance beam and floor finals of the South American Junior Games, as well as a bronze on vault. Later that year she earned two golds at the Brazilian Trophy on vault on floor.

2023

During her first year as a senior elite, Lima joined teammates Gabriela Barbosa, Josiany Calixto, Rafaela Oliva, Camille Fonseca and Luisa Maia to win team gold at the South American Championships with a score of 198,650, beating Argentina and Colombia. Lima also went on to win the silver medal in the vault final.

2024

At the 2024 Pan American Championships Lima qualified second into the all around final with a score of 51.966, behind Mexico's Michelle Pineda. She then went on to win the bronze medal behind Pineda and Argentina's Mia Mainardi, earning a score of 51.566. She placed seventh in the balance beam final with a score of 13.167. She suffered an achilles tendon rupture which ended her season.

== Competitive history ==
Year	Event	Team	AA	VT	UB	BB	FX
Junior
2019	Brazilian Junior Championships		3rd place, bronze medalist(s)	3rd place, bronze medalist(s)		2nd place, silver medalist(s)	
2021
2021	Junior Pan American Championships						3rd place, bronze medalist(s)
2021	Brazilian Junior Championships		1st place, gold medalist(s)	1st place, gold medalist(s)	2nd place, silver medalist(s)	2nd place, silver medalist(s)	1st place, gold medalist(s)
2021	Brazilian Championships		40				
2021	Junior Pan American Games	2nd place, silver medalist(s)		3rd place, bronze medalist(s)		3rd place, bronze medalist(s)	
2022	South American Junior Games			3rd place, bronze medalist(s)		2nd place, silver medalist(s)	2nd place, silver medalist(s)
2022	Brazil Trophy			1st place, gold medalist(s)			1st place, gold medalist(s)
2022	Junior Pan American Championships	4	4	6	4		7
2022	Brazilian Championships		9	4			
Senior
2023	Brazil Trophy			3rd place, bronze medalist(s)			
2023	Pan American Championships	5					
2023	Brazilian Championships	3rd place, bronze medalist(s)	4	1st place, gold medalist(s)	7	4	4
2023	South American Championships	1st place, gold medalist(s)	6	2nd place, silver medalist(s)			
2024	Baku World Cup					7	
2024	City of Jesolo Trophy	2nd place, silver medalist(s)	42				
2024	Pan American Championships	1st place, gold medalist(s)	3rd place, bronze medalist(s)			2nd place, silver medalist(s)	6
2025	Brazilian Championships	4			R1		
