= Hillary Heron =

Panamanian artistic gymnast

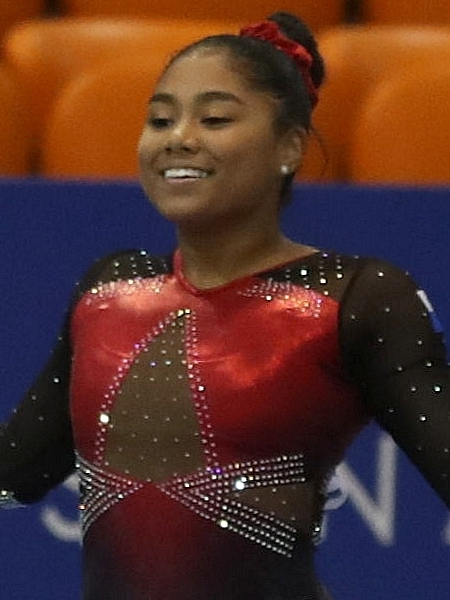
- Heron at the 2019 Junior World Championships

Personal information
- Full name: Hillary Alexandra Heron Soto
- Nickname: Hilly
- Born: 29 January 2004 (age 22) Panama City, Panama

Gymnastics career
- Discipline: Women's artistic gymnastics
- Country represented: Panama; (2017–present)
- Club: No Limits Gymnastics
- Head coach: Carlos Rafael Gil
- Eponymous skills: Heron (F): (Floor exercise) Double salto backward tucked with 1½ twist
Medal record
Representing Panama
Pan American Championships
Silver medal – second place	2021 Rio de Janeiro	Vault
Silver medal – second place	2024 Santa Marta	Vault
South American Games
Silver medal – second place	2022 Asunción	Vault
Silver medal – second place	2026 Santa Fe	Vault
Bronze medal – third place	2022 Asunción	Floor exercise
Bronze medal – third place	2026 Santa Fe	Team
South American Championships
Gold medal – first place	2023 Cali	Vault
Silver medal – second place	2023 Cali	Uneven bars
Silver medal – second place	2024 Aracaju	All-around
Bronze medal – third place	2023 Cali	All-around
Bronze medal – third place	2024 Aracaju	Team
Central American and Caribbean Games
Silver medal – second place	2023 San Salvador	Team
Bronze medal – third place	2023 San Salvador	All-around
Bronze medal – third place	2023 San Salvador	Floor exercise
Bolivarian Games
Gold medal – first place	2025 Lima	Team
Silver medal – second place	2022 Valledupar	Floor exercise
Silver medal – second place	2025 Lima	Uneven bars
Bronze medal – third place	2022 Valledupar	Team
Bronze medal – third place	2022 Valledupar	All-around
Bronze medal – third place	2022 Valledupar	Vault
Bronze medal – third place	2025 Lima	Balance beam
FIG World Cup Series
Event	1st	2nd	3rd
Apparatus World Cup	0	2	1
Total	0	2	1

Hillary Alexandra Heron Soto (born 29 January 2004) is a Panamanian artistic gymnast. She is the 2023 South American champion and the 2021 and 2024 Pan American silver medalist on vault. She represented Panama at the 2024 Summer Olympics.

== Early life ==
Heron was born in Panama in 2004 to Ricardo Heron and Yaroslavi Soto. She is the granddaughter of the late New York Yankees scout Karl Heron. The 2008 Olympic Games in Beijing inspired her love for the sport of gymnastics.

== Junior gymnastics career ==
=== 2017–18 ===
Heron made her international debut at the 2017 South American Junior Championships. She finished eighth in the all-around, seventh on vault, and eighth on floor exercise.

Heron started the 2018 season competing at the Pacific Rim Championships where she finished 16th in the all-around and fourth on vault. She next competed at the Junior Pan American Championships, where she helped Panama finish seventh as team; Heron finished 11th in the all-around and fourth on vault. Additionally, she finished seventh on the floor exercise.

In October, Heron competed at the Junior South American Championships, where she placed fourth in the all-around. During event finals, she placed second on vault and balance beam, fourth on uneven bars, and fifth on floor exercise. Her final event of the year was the Top Gym Tournament where she finished 13th on the uneven bars.

=== 2019 ===
Heron was selected to compete at the inaugural Junior World Championships alongside Karla Navas. Together they finished 23rd as a team. Individually, Heron finished 44th in the all-around. Heron ended the season competing at the Junior South American Championships. She placed fourth in the all-around and helped Panama place third as a team. During event finals, she placed first on vault, third on uneven bars, fourth on balance beam, and eighth on floor exercise.

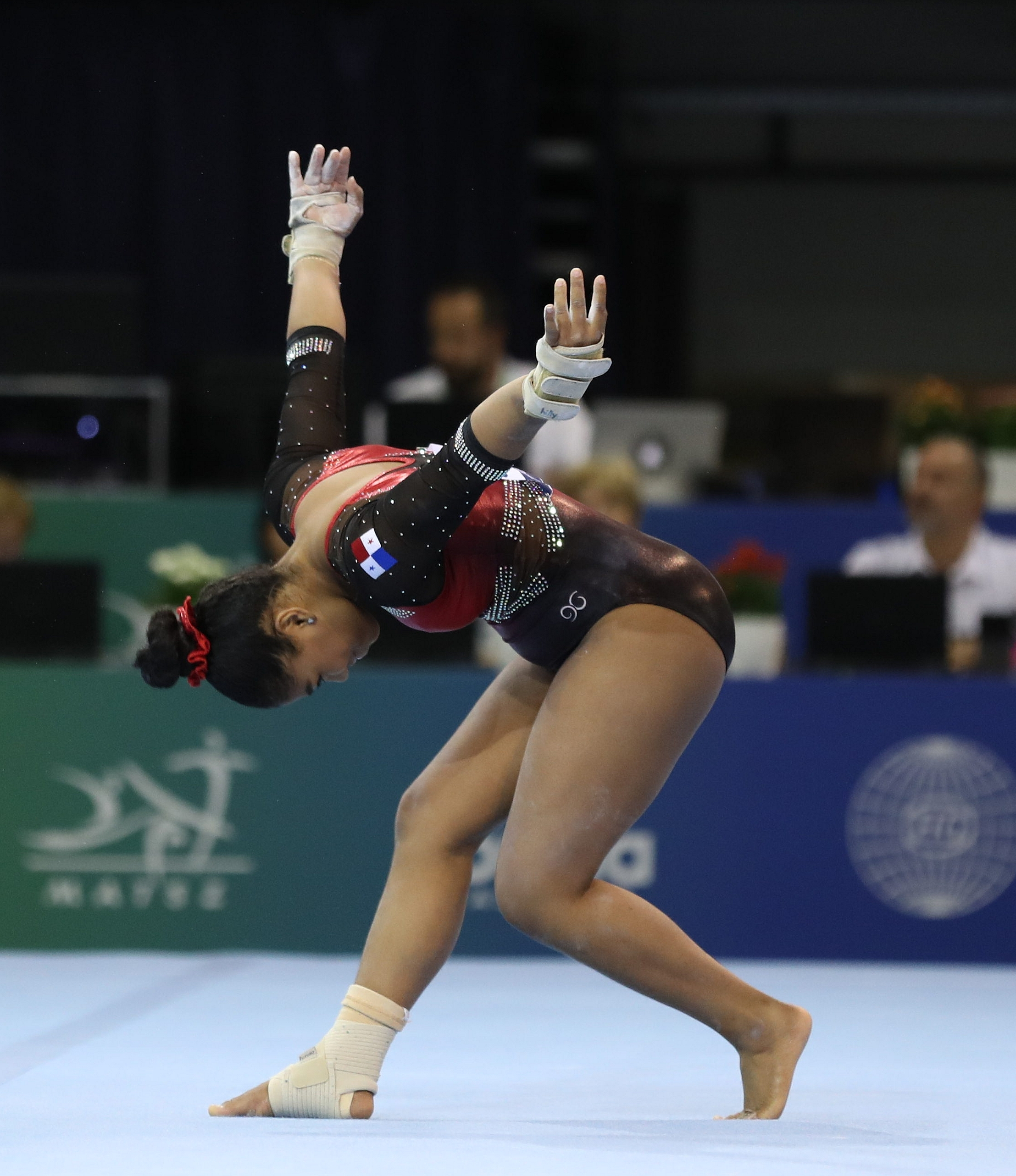
Floor exercise

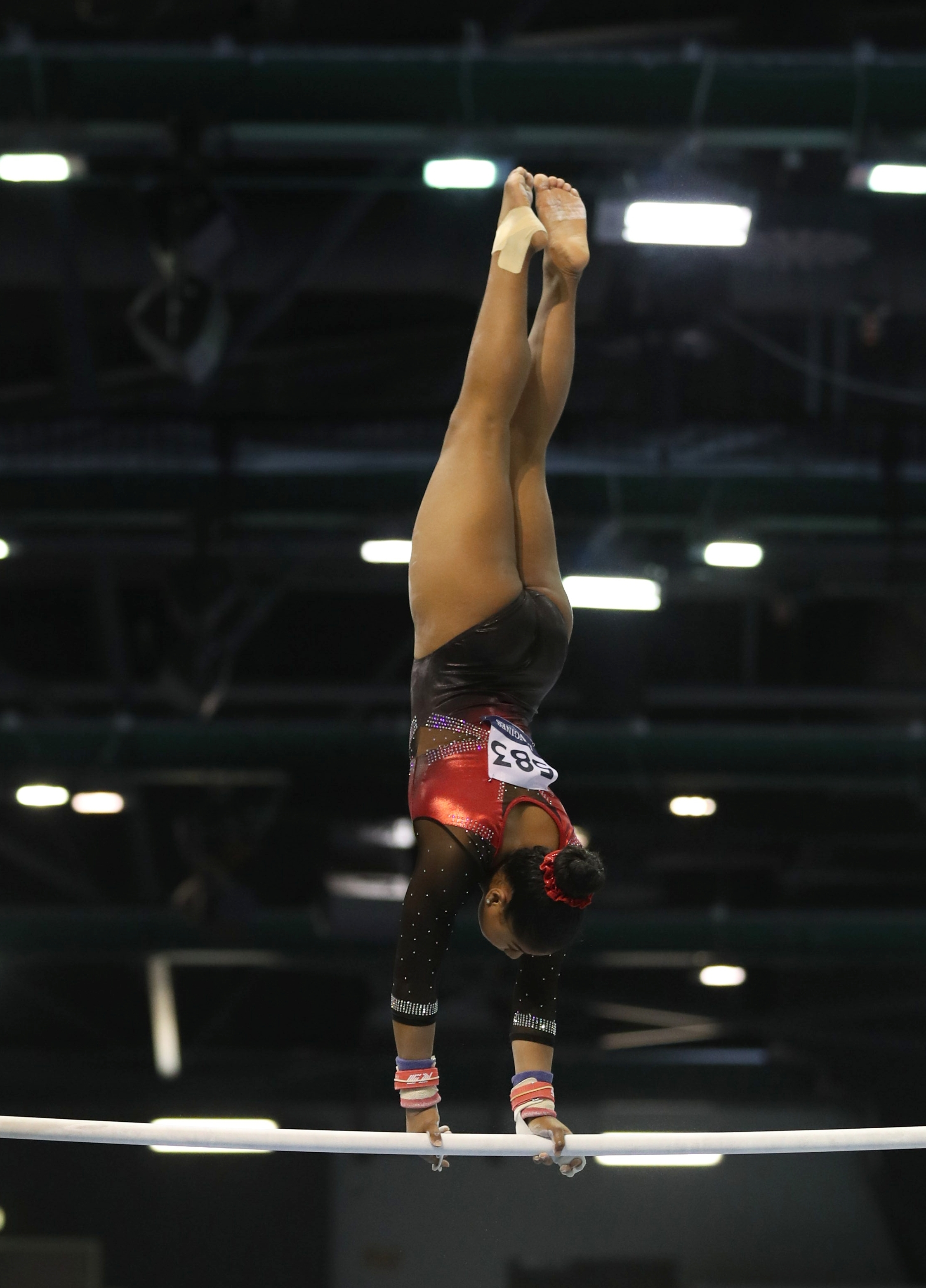
Uneven bars

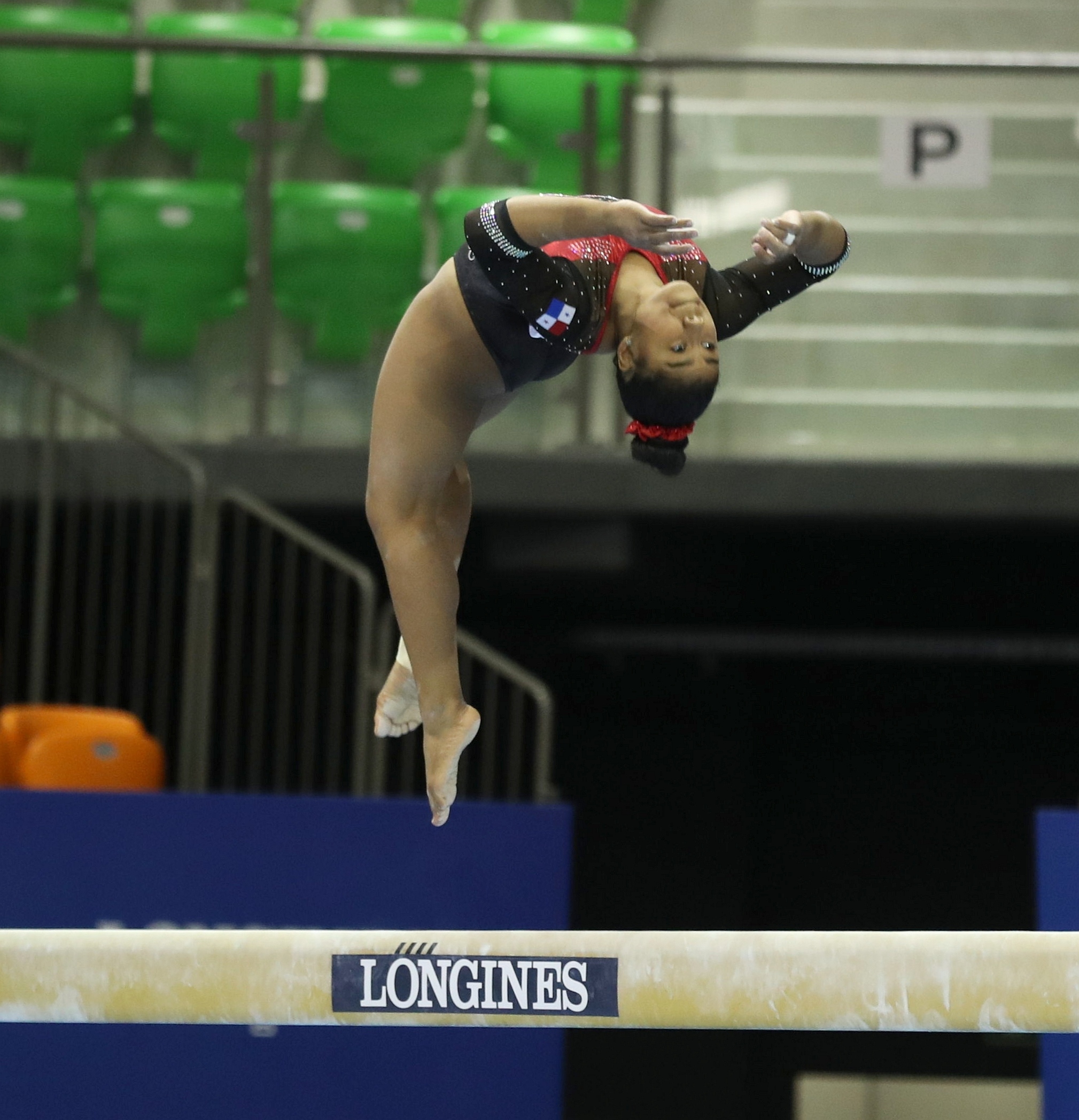
Balance beam

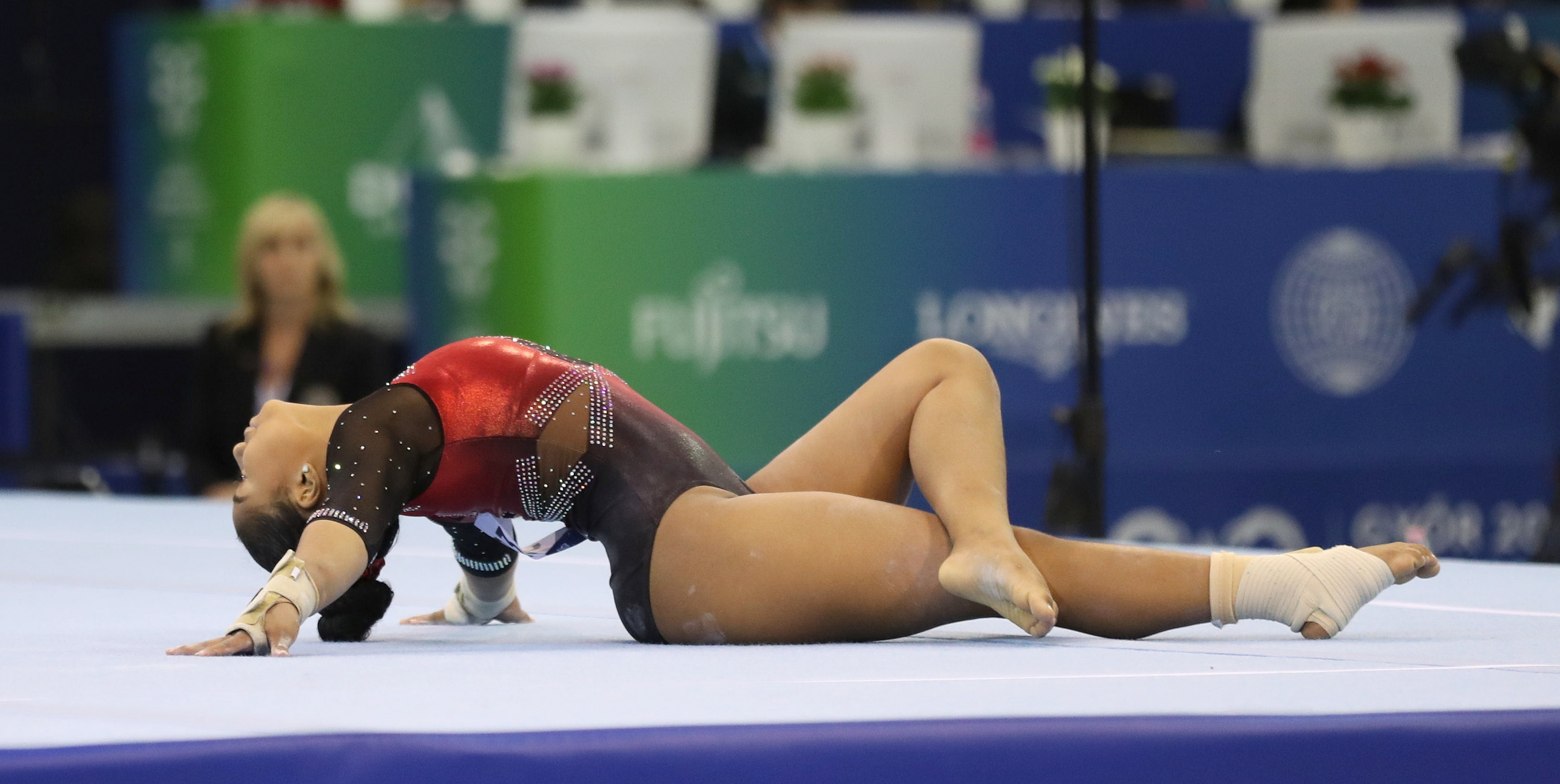
Floor exercise

Heron at the 2019 Junior World Championships

== Senior gymnastics career ==
=== 2020–21 ===
Heron became age-eligible for senior competition in 2020; however, most competitions were canceled or postponed in 2020 due to the global COVID-19 pandemic. Therefore, Heron did not compete that year. She returned to competition at the 2021 Pan American Championships where she helped Panama place fourth as a team, and individually, she placed 15th in the all-around. During event finals, she placed second on vault behind Natalia Escalera.

=== 2022 ===
Heron competed at the Bolivarian Games and was Panama's flag bearer in the opening ceremony. She helped Panama finish third as a team. Individually, she finished third in the all-around and on vault and won silver on floor exercise. She next competed at the Pan American Championships where she helped Panama finish tenth as a team during qualifications. Individually, she placed 29th in the all-around. At the South American Games, Heron won the silver medal on vault and the bronze medal on floor exercise. She also placed fifth with the Panamanian team and 12th in the all-around.

=== 2023 ===
Heron competed at the Cairo World Cup where she won bronze on vault behind Joscelyn Roberson and Asia D'Amato. Additionally, she placed fifth on floor exercise. At the Pan American Championships, she helped Panama qualify for the team final and finish seventh. Then at the Central American & Caribbean Games, she helped Panama win the silver medal behind Mexico. She won the all-around bronze medal behind teammate Karla Navas and Mexico's Alexa Moreno. She also won the bronze medal on the floor exercise.

Heron won the all-around bronze medal at the South American Championships behind Brazilians Gabriela Barbosa and Josiany Calixto. She won the vault title and also won silver on the uneven bars behind Calixto. Mistakes at the Pan American Championships prevented her from receiving an all-around qualification spot to the World Championships, but she was still able to perform on every event due to qualifying through the World Cup series. At the World Championships, she finished 41st in the all-around, qualifying for the 2024 Summer Olympics as an individual. On the floor exercise, she performed a double layout half out, also known as the Biles, becoming the first gymnast other than Simone Biles to perform one of Biles' named skills at a World Championships.

After the World Championships, Heron represented Panama at the 2023 Pan American Games. She helped the team finish seventh, and individually, she placed tenth in the all-around final and sixth in the floor exercise final.

=== 2024 ===
Heron began her season at the Cairo World Cup. During the qualification round, she performed a new element in her floor exercise, a double back tucked salto with one and a half twists, which was named after her. During the floor exercise final, she finished sixth. She also competed at the Cottbus World Cup but did not advance into any finals. Then at the Baku World Cup, she placed eighth on the floor exercise. At the 2024 Olympic Games Heron finished forty-forth during qualifications and did not advance to any finals.

== Eponymous skill ==
Heron has a floor exercise skill named after her in the Code of Points, a double back tucked salto on floor with 1.5 twists.

Apparatus	Name	Description	Difficulty (Note: Valid for the 2022–2024 Code of Points)	Added to the Code of Points
Floor exercise	Heron	Double salto backward tucked with 1½ twist (540)	F	2024 Cairo World Cup

== Competitive history ==
Competitive history of Hillary Heron at the junior level
Year	Event	Team	AA	VT	UB	BB	FX
2017	South American Championships		8	7			8
2018	Pacific Rim Championships		16	4			
2018	Pan American Championships	7	11	4			
2018	South American Championships		4	2nd place, silver medalist(s)	4	2nd place, silver medalist(s)	5
2018	Top Gym Tournament				13		
2019
2019	Junior World Championships	23	44				
2019	South American Championships	3rd place, bronze medalist(s)	4	1st place, gold medalist(s)	3rd place, bronze medalist(s)	4	8

Competitive history of Hillary Heron at the senior level
Year	Event	Team	AA	VT	UB	BB	FX
2021
2021	Pan American Championships	4	15	2nd place, silver medalist(s)			
2022	Bolivarian Games	3rd place, bronze medalist(s)	3rd place, bronze medalist(s)	3rd place, bronze medalist(s)		7	2nd place, silver medalist(s)
2022	Pan American Championships	10	29				
2022	South American Games	5	12	2nd place, silver medalist(s)			3rd place, bronze medalist(s)
2023	Cairo World Cup			3rd place, bronze medalist(s)			5
2023	Pan American Championships	7		9	25	16	10
2023	Central American & Caribbean Games	2nd place, silver medalist(s)	3rd place, bronze medalist(s)	5			3rd place, bronze medalist(s)
2023	South American Championships	4	3rd place, bronze medalist(s)	1st place, gold medalist(s)	2nd place, silver medalist(s)		4
2023	World Championships		41				
2023	Pan American Games	7	10				6
2024	Cairo World Cup						6
2024	Baku World Cup						8
2024	Pan American Championships	5		2nd place, silver medalist(s)			
2024	RomGym Trophy		8	5	8	5	
2024	Olympic Games		44				
2024	South American Championships	3rd place, bronze medalist(s)	2nd place, silver medalist(s)				
2025
2025	Pan American Championships	6				8	
2025	World Championships			42			
2025	Bolivarian Games	1st place, gold medalist(s)			2nd place, silver medalist(s)	3rd place, bronze medalist(s)	
2026	Baku World Cup			8			
2026	Cairo World Cup			2nd place, silver medalist(s)			2nd place, silver medalist(s)
2026	Osijek World Cup			4			
2026	Pan American Championships	6	10	5		R2	R3
2026	South American Games	3rd place, bronze medalist(s)	4	2nd place, silver medalist(s)		7	5
2026	World Championships		70				

Olympic Games
Preceded by Atheyna Bylon; Alonso Edward	Flagbearer for Panama; Paris 2024 with Franklin Archibold	Succeeded by Incumbent
