= 2026 South American Artistic Gymnastics Championships =

The 2026 South American Artistic Gymnastics Championships was held in Lima, Peru, from November 17 to 23, 2026. The competition was organized by the Peruvian Gymnastics Federation and approved by the International Gymnastics Federation.

== Medalists ==
=== Senior ===
Event	Gold	Silver	Bronze
Men
Team all-around	Brazil; Juliano Oliva; Diogo Paes; João Perdigão; Gustavo Pereira; Diogo Rodrigues; Pedro Silvestre	Chile; Joel Álvarez; Diego Espejo; Luciano Letelier; Agustín Lira; Nicolás Toro; Ignacio Varas	Argentina; Dylan Bratoz; Mariano Cornejo; Fernando Espíndola; Julián Inguanti; Fausto Latella; Nahuel Martínez
Individual all-around	Luciano Letelier (CHI)	Pedro Silvestre (BRA)	Edward Gonzalez (PER)
Floor exercise	Juan Felipe Ramos (COL)	Juliano Oliva (BRA)	Ignacio Varas (CHI)
Pommel horse	Luciano Letelier (CHI)	Nicolás Toro (CHI)	Edward Gonzalez (PER)
Rings	Diego Espejo (CHI)	Nicholas Townsend (PER)	Julián Inguanti (ARG)
Vault	Pedro Silvestre (BRA)	Juliano Oliva (BRA)	Ignacio Varas (CHI)
Parallel bars	Joel Álvarez (CHI) Diego Espejo (CHI)	—N/a	Diogo Paes (BRA)
Horizontal bar	Luciano Letelier (CHI)	Joel Álvarez (CHI) César López (ECU)	—N/a
Women
Team all-around	Argentina; Yasmin Aizpitarte; Fila Dalinger; Delfina Estoco; Sira Macías; Meline Mesropian; Rocío Saucedo	Brazil; Luiza Abel; Isabel Aguilar; Gabriela Barbosa; Nicole Bello; Julia Coutinho; Maria Eduarda Montesino	Peru; Cristina Candiotti; Fabiana Cuneo; Fabiola Díaz; Ana Karina Méndez; Soleil Rodrigues; Yannick Worring
Individual all-around	Rocío Saucedo (ARG)	Delfina Estoco (ARG) Julia Coutinho (BRA)	—N/a
Vault	Makarena Pinto (CHI)	Luiza Abel (BRA)	Ginna Escobar (COL)
Uneven bars	Sira Macías (ARG)	Meline Mesropian (ARG) Ashley Bohórquez (ECU)	—N/a
Balance beam	Fabiola Díaz (PER)	Rocío Saucedo (ARG)	Martina Flores (CHI)
Floor exercise	Julia Coutinho (BRA)	Nicole Bello (BRA)	Fabiola Díaz (PER)

== Participating nations ==
- Argentina
- Aruba
- Brazil
- Chile
- Colombia
- Ecuador
- Peru
- Uruguay

== Medal table ==
Rank	Nation	Gold	Silver	Bronze	Total
1	Chile (CHI)	7	3	3	13
2	Brazil (BRA)	3	7	1	11
3	Argentina (ARG)	3	3	2	8
4	Peru (PER)	1	1	4	6
5	Colombia (COL)	1	0	1	2
6	Ecuador (ECU)	0	2	0	2
Totals (6 entries)		15	16	11	42

== See also ==
- 2026 Pan American Artistic Gymnastics Championships
- Gymnastics at the 2026 South American Games
