= Ivona Krmelová =

Czech gymnast

Personal information
- Nationality: Czech
- Born: 29 October 1969 (age 55); Bohumín, Czechoslovakia

Sport
- Sport: Gymnastics

Ivona Krmelová (born 29 October 1969) is a Czech former gymnast. She competed in six events at the 1988 Summer Olympics.

== Personal life ==
Krmelová's son, Adam Lakomy, is an artistic gymnast.
