= Gabriela Barbosa =

Brazilian artistic gymnast

- Full name: Gabriela Rodrigues Barbosa
- Nickname: Gabi
- Born: 8 December 2007 (age 18) São Paulo

Gymnastics career
- Discipline: Women's artistic gymnastics
- Country represented: Brazil; (2023–present)
- Club: Pinheiros
- Eponymous skills: Uneven bars: Clear straddle circle with salto forward piked with ½ turn (180°)
Medal record
Artistic gymnastics
Representing Brazil
Pan American Championships
| Gold medal – first place | 2024 Santa Marta | Team |
| Silver medal – second place | 2026 Rio de Janeiro | Team |
| Bronze medal – third place | 2025 Panama City | Team |
South American Games
| Silver medal – second place | 2026 Santa Fe | Team |
South American Championships
| Gold medal – first place | 2023 Cali | Team |
| Gold medal – first place | 2023 Cali | All-around |
| Gold medal – first place | 2024 Aracaju | Team |
| Gold medal – first place | 2025 Medellín | Team |
| Gold medal – first place | 2025 Medellín | Balance beam |
| Silver medal – second place | 2023 Cali | Floor exercise |
| Silver medal – second place | 2026 Lima | Team |
| Bronze medal – third place | 2023 Cali | Uneven bars |
Junior Pan American Games
| Silver medal – second place | 2021 Cali | Team |
FIG World Cup
Event / 1st / 2nd / 3rd; World Challenge Cup / 0 / 2 / 0

Gabriela Rodrigues Barbosa (born 8 December 2007) is a Brazilian artistic gymnast and a member of the Brazilian national gymnastics team.

== Career ==
=== 2023 ===
During her first year as a senior athlete, Barbosa won the all-around title ahead of teammate Josiany Calixto and Panamanian gymnast Hillary Heron at the South American Championships. The Brazilian team led by Barbosa, Calixto, Rafaela Oliva, Andreza Lima, Camille Fonseca and Luisa Maia finished first with 198,650 points, ahead of Argentina by 8,500 points and Colombia by 10,650 points. She also got silver on floor behind Oliva and bronze on uneven bars, sharing the podium with Calixto and Heron again. Barbosa also finished fifth on balance beam.

== Eponymous skill ==
| Apparatus | Name | Description | Difficulty (Note: Valid for the 2025–2028 Code of Points) | Added to the Code of Points |
|---|---|---|---|---|
| Uneven bars | Rodrigues | Clear straddle circle with salto forward piked with ½ turn (180°) | C (0.3) | 2026 Osijek World Cup |

== Competitive history ==
| Year | Event | Team | AA | VT | UB | BB | FX |
Junior
2021
| 2021 | Junior Pan American Championships | 2nd place, silver medalist(s) | | | | 3rd place, bronze medalist(s) | |
| 2021 | Brazilian Junior Championships | 5 | 2nd place, silver medalist(s) | 4 | 1st place, gold medalist(s) | 3rd place, bronze medalist(s) | 2nd place, silver medalist(s) |
| 2021 | Brazilian Championships | 3rd place, bronze medalist(s) | 7 | | | | 8 |
| 2021 | Junior Pan American Games | 2nd place, silver medalist(s) | 5 | | 6 | 6 | |
| 2022 | South American Youth Games | 1st place, gold medalist(s) | 2nd place, silver medalist(s) | | 2nd place, silver medalist(s) | 3rd place, bronze medalist(s) | |
| 2022 | Brazil Trophy | | | | | 4 | 2nd place, silver medalist(s) |
| 2022 | Junior Pan American Championships | 4 | 8 | | 7 | 4 | |
| 2022 | Brazilian Championships | 3rd place, bronze medalist(s) | 7 | | 8 | 13 | 13 |
| 2022 | Brazilian Junior Championships | 4 | 1st place, gold medalist(s) | 2nd place, silver medalist(s) | 4 | 2nd place, silver medalist(s) | 3rd place, bronze medalist(s) |
| 2022 | South American Junior Championships | 1st place, gold medalist(s) | 1st place, gold medalist(s) | 4 | 5 | 3rd place, bronze medalist(s) | 5 |
Senior
2023
| 2023 | DTB Pokal Team Challenge | 9 | | | | | |
| 2023 | Brazil Trophy | | | | 5 | 6 | 3rd place, bronze medalist(s) |
| 2023 | Brazilian Championships | 4 | 5 | | 8 | 9 | 12 |
| 2023 | South American Championships | 1st place, gold medalist(s) | 1st place, gold medalist(s) | | 3rd place, bronze medalist(s) | 5 | 2nd place, silver medalist(s) |
2024
| 2024 | Pan American Championships | 1st place, gold medalist(s) | 5 | | | | |
| 2024 | Brazil Trophy | | | | 7 | 3rd place, bronze medalist(s) | |
| 2024 | Brazilian Championships | 3rd place, bronze medalist(s) | 6 | | 6 | 2nd place, silver medalist(s) | |
| 2024 | South American Championships | 1st place, gold medalist(s) | 6 | | | | |
| 2025 | Brazil Trophy | | | | 4 | 2nd place, silver medalist(s) | 6 |
| 2025 | Koper World Challenge Cup | | | | 2nd place, silver medalist(s) | 8 | 2nd place, silver medalist(s) |
| 2025 | Pan American Championships | 3rd place, bronze medalist(s) | 8 | | | | |
| 2025 | Brazilian Championships | 2nd place, silver medalist(s) | 5 | | 3rd place, bronze medalist(s) | 2nd place, silver medalist(s) | 6 |
| 2025 | South American Championships | 1st place, gold medalist(s) | 6 | | | 1st place, gold medalist(s) | |
| 2026 | Brazil Trophy | | | | 5 | | |
| 2026 | Pan American Championships | 2nd place, silver medalist(s) | | | | | |
| 2026 | South American Games | 2nd place, silver medalist(s) | | | | | |
