= Mia Mainardi =

Argentine artistic gymnast

Mía Mainardi
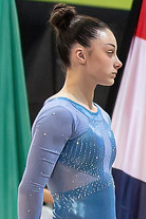
- Mainardi in 2022

Personal information
- Full name: Mía Giuliana Mainardi
- Born: 17 April 2008 (age 18)

Gymnastics career
- Discipline: Women's artistic gymnastics
- Country represented: Argentina
- Club: Club Atlético River Plate
- Head coach: Mariano Pocini
Medal record
Women's artistic gymnastics
Representing Argentina
Pan American Championships
Gold medal – first place	2024 Santa Marta	Floor exercise
Silver medal – second place	2024 Santa Marta	All-around
South American Championships
Silver medal – second place	2024 Aracaju	Team
Silver medal – second place	2025 Medellín	Team
Junior World Championships
Gold medal – first place	2023 Antalya	Vault

Mía Giuliana Mainardi (born 17 April 2008) is an Argentine artistic gymnast. She is the 2024 Pan American floor exercise champion and all-around silver medalist. She is also the 2023 Junior World champion on the vault.

== Gymnastics career ==
Mainardi began gymnastics when she was four years old because her older sister also did gymnastics.

Mainardi made her international debut at the 2021 Junior Pan American Championships and won a bronze medal with the Argentine team behind the United States and Brazil. Then at the 2021 South American Junior Championships, she won the silver medal in the all-around behind teammate Isabella Ajalla and a gold medal in the team event.

Mainardi competed at the 2022 South American Youth Games, winning gold in the all-around, vault, and floor exercise. She also won silver with the Argentine team. At the 2022 Junior Pan American Championships, she won a bronze medal with the Argentine team. Individually, she placed fifth in the all-around, eighth on the uneven bars, and seventh on the balance beam. In the floor exercise final, she won the silver medal behind American Tiana Sumanasekera. Then at the Argentine Championships, she won a bronze medal in the all-around. She finished her 2022 season at the Top Gym Tournament in Charleroi, Belgium, winning bronze medals on the vault and floor exercise and placing seventh all-around.

Mainardi was selected to compete at the 2023 Junior World Championships in Antalya, Turkey alongside Emilia Acosta and Isabella Ajalla, and the team finished in fifth place. Mainardi qualified for the all-around final and finished twelfth. In the vault final, Mainardi won the gold medal with an average score of 13.383. She also competed in the uneven bars final where she finished sixth.

== Competitive history ==
Competitive history of Mia Mainardi at the junior level
Year	Event	Team	AA	VT	UB	BB	FX
2021
2021	Junior Pan American Championships	3rd place, bronze medalist(s)					
2021	South American Junior Championships	1st place, gold medalist(s)	2nd place, silver medalist(s)	2nd place, silver medalist(s)	2nd place, silver medalist(s)		1st place, gold medalist(s)
2022	South American Junior Games	2nd place, silver medalist(s)	1st place, gold medalist(s)	1st place, gold medalist(s)	5	6	1st place, gold medalist(s)
2022	Pan American Championships	3rd place, bronze medalist(s)	5		8	7	2nd place, silver medalist(s)
2022	Argentine Championships		3rd place, bronze medalist(s)				
2022	Top Gym Tournament	4	7	3rd place, bronze medalist(s)			3rd place, bronze medalist(s)
2023
2023	Junior World Championships	5	12	1st place, gold medalist(s)	6		
2023	South American Junior Championships	1st place, gold medalist(s)	5	2nd place, silver medalist(s)	1st place, gold medalist(s)		1st place, gold medalist(s)
2023	Argentinian Championships				1st place, gold medalist(s)	7	
2023	Top Gym Tournament	5	3rd place, bronze medalist(s)			3rd place, bronze medalist(s)	4

Competitive history of Mia Mainardi at the senior level
Year	Event	Team	AA	VT	UB	BB	FX
2024
2024	Pan American Championships	4	2nd place, silver medalist(s)				1st place, gold medalist(s)
2024	South American Championships	2nd place, silver medalist(s)					
2025	South American Championships	2nd place, silver medalist(s)		6			
2026	City of Jesolo Trophy	7					
