= 2025 South American Artistic Gymnastics Championships =

The 2025 South American Artistic Gymnastics Championships was held in Medellín, Colombia, from October 7 to 9, 2025. The competition was organized by the Colombian Gymnastics Federation and approved by the International Gymnastics Federation.

== Medalists ==
=== Senior ===
Event	Gold	Silver	Bronze
Men
Team all-around	Chile; Joel Álvarez; Josué Armijo; Diego Espejo; Pablo Figueroa; Luciano Letelier; Ignacio Varas	Brazil; Rogério Borges; Luís Porto; João Perdigão; Murilo Pontedura; Diogo Paes; Juliano Oliva	Argentina; Felipe Becerra; Ivo Chiapponi; Matías Coralizzi; Julián Inguanti; Nahuel Martínez; Nahuel Pardo
Individual all-around	Luciano Letelier (CHI)	Joel Álvarez (CHI)	Diogo Paes (BRA)
Floor exercise	Ignacio Varas (CHI)	Luís Porto (BRA)	Juan Larrahondo (COL)
Pommel horse	Luciano Letelier (CHI)	Adickxon Trejo (VEN)	Matías Coralizzi (ARG)
Rings	Diego Espejo (CHI)	Julián Inguanti (ARG)	Juliano Oliva (BRA)
Vault	Juan Larrahondo (COL)	Daniel Agüero (PER)	Daniel Chica (ECU)
Parallel bars	Adickxon Trejo (VEN)	Diogo Paes (BRA)	Matías Coralizzi (ARG)
Horizontal bar	Luciano Letelier (CHI)	Yan Zabala (COL)	Nahuel Pardo (ARG)
Women
Team all-around	Brazil; Gabriela Barbosa; Gabriela Bouças; Thaís Fidélis; Maria Eduarda Montesino; Carolyne Pedro; Rebeca Procópio	Argentina; María Dolores Carregal; Milagros Curti; Lucía González; Sira Macías; Mía Mainardi; Meline Mesropian	Colombia; Ginna Escobar; Karol González; Sofía Marín; Juliana Ochoa; Laura Pardo; Alix Sánchez
Individual all-around	Sira Macías (ARG)	Alais Perea (ECU)	Gabriela Bouças (BRA)
Vault	Lucía González (ARG)	Ashley Bohórquez (ECU)	Alais Perea (ECU)
Uneven bars	Meline Mesropian (ARG)	Gabriela Bouças (BRA)	Sira Macías (ARG)
Balance beam	Gabriela Barbosa (BRA)	Thaís Fidélis (BRA)	Meline Mesropian (ARG)
Floor exercise	Sira Macías (ARG)	Alais Perea (ECU)	Gabriela Bouças (BRA)

== Participating nations ==
- Argentina
- Aruba
- Brazil
- Chile
- Colombia
- Ecuador
- Peru
- Uruguay
- Venezuela

== Medal table ==
Rank	Nation	Gold	Silver	Bronze	Total
1	Chile (CHI)	6	1	0	7
2	Argentina (ARG)	4	2	6	12
3	Brazil (BRA)	2	5	4	11
4	Colombia (COL)	1	1	2	4
5	Venezuela (VEN)	1	1	0	2
6	Ecuador (ECU)	0	3	2	5
7	Peru (PER)	0	1	0	1
Totals (7 entries)		14	14	14	42

== See also ==
- 2025 Pan American Artistic Gymnastics Championships
