= Denelle Pedrick =

Canadian artistic gymnast

- Full name: Denelle Celeste Pedrick
- Born: February 26, 1999 (age 27) Brandon, Manitoba, Canada

Gymnastics career
- Discipline: Women's artistic gymnastics
- Country represented: Canada (2022–2025)
- College team: Central Michigan Chippewas (2017–20)
- Training location: Halifax, Nova Scotia
- Club: Halifax Alta Gymnastics
- Head coach: David Kikuchi
- Retired: January 26, 2026
Medal record
Women's artistic gymnastics
Representing Canada
World Championships
Bronze medal – third place	2022 Liverpool	Team
Pan American Championships
Silver medal – second place	2024 Santa Marta	Team
Bronze medal – third place	2022 Rio de Janeiro	Team
Summer Universiade
Silver medal – second place	2017 Taipei	Team

Denelle Celeste Pedrick (born February 26, 1999) is a Canadian former artistic gymnast. She represented Canada at the 2022 World Artistic Gymnastics Championships, contributing to the team's historic bronze medal finish. A collegiate gymnast at Central Michigan University from 2017 to 2020, she is a two-time Summer Universiade participant (2017, 2019) and won a silver medal in the team competition at the 2017 edition.

== Gymnastics career ==
Pedrick began gymnastics at age two. She was an Elite Canada qualifier from 2010-2016, and a Canadian nationals qualifier from 2011-2016.

She became a collegiate gymnast at Central Michigan University in 2017. In 2019 and 2020, she was named Mid-American Conference Gymnast of the Year. In 2020, she ranked first in the Mid-American Conference and 18th nationally with an all-around score of 39.355.

Pedrick won the level 10 all-around at the Canadian Nationals in May 2017, leading to an invitation to a Team Canada tryout. She was selected to compete at the 2017 Summer Universiade in Taipei City, where she won team silver - Canada's first ever team gymnastics medal at the competition. She placed 11th on beam and 15th on floor exercise, but did not vault due to an ankle injury. Her teammates were Jessica Dowling, Briannah Tsang, and Olympians Ellie Black and Brittany Rodgers.

At the 2019 Summer Universiade in Naples, Pedrick finished seventh all-around, which was the highest finish for any North American. The Canadian team - Pedrick, Jessica Dowling, and Alana Fischer - finished fourth.

After her collegiate career, Pedrick felt she "had some unfinished business in the sport," and decided to make a comeback to the elite level with the goal of joining Canada's national team.

At the 2022 Canadian Championships, Pedrick was first on vault and second all-around and on floor. At DTB Pokal in Stuttgart, she won vault gold. At the 2022 World Championships in Liverpool, Pedrick contributed to the team's bronze medal finish - a first ever medal for Canada, which also qualified a Canadian team to the 2024 Summer Olympics.

Pedrick announced her retirement from gymnastics via her Instagram on January 26, 2026.

== Eponymous skill ==
Pedrick has an uneven bars release moved named after her in the Code of Points.

Apparatus	Name	Description	Difficulty (Note: Valid for the 2025–2028 Code of Points)	When Added to the Code of Points
Uneven bars	Pedrick	Clear hip circle backward on high bar with hecht to clear support on low bar	C	2022 Pan American Championships
