= Isabella Ajalla =

Argentine artistic gymnast

- Full name: Isabella Ayelen Ajalla
- Born: 5 March 2008 (age 18)

Gymnastics career
- Discipline: Women's artistic gymnastics
- Country represented: Argentina; (2021–present)
- Club: Círculo Gimnástico Norte
- Head coach: Camila Soto
Medal record
Women's artistic gymnastics
Representing Argentina
Pan American Championships
Gold medal – first place	2026 Rio de Janeiro	Balance beam
Bronze medal – third place	2026 Rio de Janeiro	Floor exercise
South American Games
Gold medal – first place	2026 Santa Fe	Team

Isabella Ayelen Ajalla (born 5 March 2008) is an Argentine artistic gymnast. She is the 2026 Pan American champion on balance beam. She is the 2024 and 2025 Argentinian national champion.

== Gymnastics career ==
=== 2021–2023: Junior ===
Ajalla competed at the 2022 South American Youth Games where she helped Argentina win silver as a team and individually she won gold on uneven bars and balance beam. Additionally she won bronze in the all-around and on floor exercise. At the 2022 Junior Pan American Championships Ajalla helped Argentina win bronze as a team. Individually she won bronze medals in the all-around and on uneven bars and floor exercise.

At the 2023 Junior World Championships, Ajalla helped Argentina finish fifth as a team. Individually she finished fifteenth in the all-around.

=== 2024–present: Senior ===
Ajalla became age-eligible for senior level competition in 2024. She competed at the 2024 Pan American Championships where she helped Argentina place fourth as a team. Individually she finished thirteenth in the all-around. She ended the year competing at the Argentine National Championships where she placed first.

At the 2026 City of Jesolo Trophy, Ajalla won silver on balance beam behind Maïana Prat. She next competed at the 2026 Pan American Championships where she won gold on balance beam and bronze on floor exercise, her first major senior international medals.

Ajalla competed as part of the Argentine team at the 2026 South American Games. Alongside Julieta Lucas, Rocío Saucedo, Emilia Acosta, Fila Dalinger, and Delfina Estoco, Ajalla won team gold for Argentina, the country's first team title at the competition since 1994.

== Competitive history ==
Competitive history of Isabella Ajalla
Year	Event	Team	AA	VT	UB	BB	FX
2021	Junior South American Championships	1st place, gold medalist(s)	1st place, gold medalist(s)	1st place, gold medalist(s)	3rd place, bronze medalist(s)	3rd place, bronze medalist(s)	2nd place, silver medalist(s)
2022	South American Youth Games	2nd place, silver medalist(s)	3rd place, bronze medalist(s)		1st place, gold medalist(s)	1st place, gold medalist(s)	3rd place, bronze medalist(s)
2022	Junior Pan American Championships	3rd place, bronze medalist(s)	3rd place, bronze medalist(s)	5	3rd place, bronze medalist(s)	8	3rd place, bronze medalist(s)
2023
2023	Junior World Championships	5	15		R2		
2023	Junior South American Championships	1st place, gold medalist(s)	1st place, gold medalist(s)		5	1st place, gold medalist(s)	4
2024
2024	Pan American Championships	4	13			7	
2024	Argentina National Championships		1st place, gold medalist(s)				
2025
2025	Pan American Championships	4	6		5		8
2025	Argentina National Championships		1st place, gold medalist(s)				
2025	Szombathely World Challenge Cup					4	
2025	Gymnova Cup		13				
2026	City of Jesolo Trophy	7	22			2nd place, silver medalist(s)	
2026	Pan American Championships	4	7			1st place, gold medalist(s)	3rd place, bronze medalist(s)
2026	South American Games	1st place, gold medalist(s)					6
2026	World Championships						
