= Michelle Pineda =

Mexican artistic gymnast

- Full name: Michelle Janeth Pineda
- Born: 13 December 2007 (age 18) Collin, Texas, United States

Gymnastics career
- Discipline: Women's artistic gymnastics
- Country represented: Mexico (2024–present)
- Former countries represented: United States (2021–2023)
- College team: UCLA Bruins (2027–2030)
- Club: Metroplex Gymnastics
Medal record
Representing Mexico
Pan American Championships
Gold medal – first place	2024 Santa Marta	All Around
Gold medal – first place	2024 Santa Marta	Balance Beam
Silver medal – second place	2024 Santa Marta	Floor Exercise
Bronze medal – third place	2024 Santa Marta	Team
FIG World Cup
Event / 1st / 2nd / 3rd; Apparatus World Cup / 0 / 0 / 1

Michelle Janeth Pineda (born 13 December 2007) is a Mexican-American artistic gymnast. She is the 2024 Pan American all-around and balance beam champion.

== Career ==
Pineda began gymnastics at age six and began training at Metroplex Gymnastics in 2017.

She began her junior elite season competing at the 2021 Winter Cup, placing 13th in the junior all around. In 2022 she placed eleventh in the junior Winter Cup all around, tied with Claire Pease of WOGA. She placed seventh in the junior U.S Classic, and seventeenth in the junior U.S. Championship.

Pineda qualified elite following the Buckeye Classic in 2022, where she gained a 49.900 score in the all around, surpassing the necessary 49.500 to qualify. She was the only competitor at the meet to gain elite status. At the 2023 senior American Classic Pineda earned the bronze in the all around and gold on the floor exercise.

In 2024 Pineda gained a FIG licence to compete for Mexico, and she joined their B team. She then competed in the 2024 Pan American Championships, where she qualified first in the all around with a score of 52.533. She also contributed on all events to lead Mexico to a team bronze. During the all around final she earned the gold medal with a score of 52.500. In event finals she placed fourth on uneven bars and tied with Brazil's Hellen Carvalho for silver on floor exercise with a score of 13.100. She won the gold on balance beam with a score of 13.367.

== Competitive history ==
Competitive history of Michelle Pineda representing the United States
Year	Event	Team	AA	VT	UB	BB	FX
2021	Junior Winter Cup		13	10	12	13	11
2022	Junior Winter Cup		11	16	8	12	8
2022	Junior U.S. Classic		7	12	10	8	8
2022	Junior U.S. National Championships		17	22	17	4	21
2023	Winter Cup		16		23	17	10
2023	American Classic		3rd place, bronze medalist(s)				1st place, gold medalist(s)
2023	U.S. Classic		9		13	8	12
2023	U.S. National Championships		21		15	17	21

Competitive history of Michelle Pineda representing Mexico
Year	Event	Team	AA	VT	UB	BB	FX
2024	Mexican Championships						3rd place, bronze medalist(s)
2024	Pan American Championships	3rd place, bronze medalist(s)	1st place, gold medalist(s)		4	1st place, gold medalist(s)	2nd place, silver medalist(s)
2025	Antalya World Cup					6	3rd place, bronze medalist(s)
2026	Mexican Championships		1st place, gold medalist(s)				
2026	Pan American Championships	5	20			8	7
2026	World Championships	15	R4				
