= 2023 South American Artistic Gymnastics Championships =

The 2023 South American Artistic Gymnastics Championships was held in Cali, Colombia, from September 8 to 10, 2023. The competition was approved by the International Gymnastics Federation.

== Medalists ==
Event	Gold	Silver	Bronze
Men
Team all-around	Brazil; Francisco Barretto; Lucas Bitencourt; Gabriel Faria; Diogo Paes; Murilo Pontedura; Luís Porto	Colombia; Marcos Aguilar; Dilan Jiménez; Juan Larrahondo; Andrés Martínez; Juan Felipe Ramos; Sergio Vargas	Chile; Joaquin Álvarez; Joel Álvarez; Josué Armijo; Luciano Letelier; Agustín Lira; Cristobal Prado
Individual all-around	Gabriel Faria (BRA)	Francisco Barretto (BRA)	Edward González (PER)
Floor exercise	Andrés Martínez (COL)	Luciano Letelier (CHI)	Juan Larrahondo (COL)
Pommel horse	Edward González (PER)	Gabriel Faria (BRA)	Luca Alfieri (ARG)
Rings	Dilan Jiménez (COL)	Joaquin Álvarez (CHI)	César López (ECU)
Vault	Juan Larrahondo (COL)	Luís Porto (BRA)	Daniel Agüero (PER)
Parallel bars	Dilan Jiménez (COL)	Edward González (PER)	Joel Álvarez (CHI)
Horizontal bar	Lucas Bitencourt (BRA)	Andrés Martínez (COL)	Francisco Barretto (BRA)
Women
Team all-around	Brazil; Gabriela Barbosa; Josiany Calixto; Camille Fonseca; Andreza Lima; Luisa Maia; Rafaela Oliva	Argentina; Brisa Carraro; Milagros Curti Ruiz; Lara Demarsico; Melina Gonzalez; Leila Martinez; Zoe Salgado	Colombia; Ginna Escobar; Angelica Mesa; Juliana Ochoa; Valentina Pardo; Eliana Valenzuela; Maria José Villegas
Individual all-around	Gabriela Barbosa (BRA)	Josiany Calixto (BRA)	Hillary Heron (PAN)
Vault	Hillary Heron (PAN)	Andreza Lima (BRA)	Zoe Salgado (ARG)
Uneven bars	Josiany Calixto (BRA)	Hillary Heron (PAN)	Gabriela Barbosa (BRA)
Balance beam	Josiany Calixto (BRA)	Zoe Salgado (ARG)	Eliana Valenzuela (COL)
Floor exercise	Rafaela Oliva (BRA)	Gabriela Barbosa (BRA)	Barbara Achondo (CHI)

== Participating nations ==
- Argentina
- Brazil
- Chile
- Colombia
- Ecuador
- Panama
- Peru
- Uruguay

== Medal table ==
Rank	Nation	Gold	Silver	Bronze	Total
1	Brazil (BRA)	8	6	2	16
2	Colombia (COL)	4	2	3	9
3	Peru (PER)	1	1	2	4
4	Panama (PAN)	1	1	1	3
5	Chile (CHI)	0	2	3	5
6	Argentina (ARG)	0	2	2	4
7	Ecuador (ECU)	0	0	1	1
Totals (7 entries)		14	14	14	42

== See also ==
- Gymnastics at the 2023 Pan American Games
