= 2024 Pan American Artistic Gymnastics Championships =

Gymnastics event in Santa Marta, Colombia

Pan American Gymnastics Championships
- Location: Santa Marta, Colombia
- Date: May 22–26, 2024

The 2024 Pan American Gymnastics Championships were an artistic gymnastics competition that took place in Santa Marta, Colombia from May 22–26.

The United States sent only junior gymnasts, the first time it had not sent a senior team since 2017.

== Medalists ==
=== Senior ===
Event	Gold	Silver	Bronze
Men
Team all-around	Brazil; Lucas Bitencourt; Tomás Florêncio; Patrick Sampaio; Diogo Soares; Caio Souza; Gabriel Faria	Colombia; Kristopher Bohórquez; Jordan Castro; Dilan Jiménez; Andrés Martínez; José Martínez	Argentina; Santiago Agostinelli; Luca Alfieri; Julian Jato; Santiago Mayol; Daniel Villafañe
Individual all-around	(Brazil) Caio Souza	(Chile) Luciano Letelier	(Argentina) Santiago Mayol
Floor exercise	(Mexico) Alonso Pérez	(Colombia) Andrés Martínez	(Argentina) Julian Jato
Pommel horse	(Brazil) Diogo Soares	(Peru) Edward Alarcón	(Argentina) Luca Alfieri
Rings	(Chile) Joaquín Álvarez	(Argentina) Daniel Villafañe	(Brazil) Caio Souza
Vault	(Brazil) Caio Souza	(Colombia) Dilan Jiménez	(Chile) Josué Armijo
Parallel bars	(Colombia) Dilan Jiménez	(Brazil) Diogo Soares	(Venezuela) Adickxon Trejo
Horizontal bar	(Brazil) Diogo Soares	(Brazil) Caio Souza	(Mexico) Joseph Solís
Women
Team all-around	Brazil; Luiza Abel; Gabriela Barbosa; Andreza Lima; Carolyne Pedro; Hellen Silva; Josiany Calixto	Canada; Denelle Pedrick; Tegan Shaver; Emma Spence; Sydney Turner	Mexico; Alondra Calderón; Regina Collado; Mariangela Flores; Valentina Meléndez; Michelle Pineda
Individual all-around	(Mexico) Michelle Pineda	(Argentina) Mia Mainardi	(Brazil) Andreza Lima
Vault	(Panama) Karla Navas	(Panama) Hillary Heron	(Canada) Emma Spence
Uneven bars	(Colombia) Daira Lamadrid	(Canada) Sydney Turner	(Argentina) Meline Mesropian
Balance beam	(Mexico) Michelle Pineda	(Brazil) Andreza Lima	(Canada) Sydney Turner
Floor exercise	(Argentina) Mia Mainardi	(Brazil) Hellen Silva (Mexico) Michelle Pineda	None awarded

=== Junior ===
Event	Gold	Silver	Bronze
Men
Team all-around	United States; Hasan Aydogdu; Xander Hong; Jakson Kurecki; Adam Lakomy; Sasha Bogonosiuk	Colombia; Jorman Álvarez; Thomas Mejía; Camilo Vera; Yan Zabala	Mexico; Juan Hernández; Aaron Ibarra; Diego Jaime; Dario Mauricio
Individual all-around	(United States) Adam Lakomy	(United States) Hasan Aydogdu	(Colombia) Camilo Vera
Floor exercise	(United States) Xander Hong	(United States) Hasan Aydogdu	(Colombia) Thomas Mejía
Pommel horse	(Canada) Jordan Carroll	(Colombia) Yan Zabala	(United States) Hasan Aydogdu
Rings	(Colombia) Camilo Vera	(Chile) Diego Espejo	(United States) Adam Lakomy
Vault	(Colombia) Camilo Vera	(Mexico) Juan Hernández	(Chile) Arturo Rossel
Parallel bars	(Colombia) Yan Zabala	(Guatemala) Jaycko Bourdet	(United States) Adam Lakomy
Horizontal bar	(Colombia) Camilo Vera	(Colombia) Thomas Mejía	(Mexico) Dario Mauricio
Women
Team all-around	United States; Isabella Anzola; Addy Fulcher; Gabrielle Hardie; Camie Westerman; Ally Damelio	Canada; Zoe Cadrin; Lia-Monica Fontaine; Alyssa Guerrier-Calixte; Lia Redick; Gabrielle Fausto	Argentina; Emilia Acosta; Dolores Carregal; Constanza Galfranscoli; Julieta Lucas
Individual all-around	(Canada) Lia Monica Fontaine	(United States) Gabrielle Hardie	(United States) Addy Fulcher
Vault	(Canada) Lia Monica Fontaine	(Brazil) Sophia Weisberg	(United States) Addy Fulcher
Uneven bars	(United States) Gabrielle Hardie	(United States) Addy Fulcher	(Canada) Lia Monica Fontaine
Balance beam	(United States) Isabella Anzola	(United States) Gabrielle Hardie	(Canada) Lia Monica Fontaine
Floor exercise	(United States) Gabrielle Hardie	(Argentina) Emilia Acosta	(United States) Isabella Anzola

== Medal table ==
* Host nation (Colombia)

Rank	Nation	Gold	Silver	Bronze	Total
1	United States	7	5	6	18
2	Colombia*	6	6	2	14
3	Brazil	6	5	2	13
4	Canada	3	3	4	10
5	Mexico	3	2	4	9
6	Argentina	1	3	6	10
7	Chile	1	2	2	5
8	Panama	1	1	0	2
9	Guatemala	0	1	0	1
9	Peru	0	1	0	1
11	Venezuela	0	0	1	1
Totals (11 entries)		28	29	27	84

== Men's results ==
=== Team ===
Rank	Team	Floor (gymnastics)	Pommel horse	Rings (gymnastics)	Vault (gymnastics)	Parallel bars	Horizontal bar	Total
1st place, gold medalist(s)	Brazil	38.600	35.700 (-1.0)	40.066	42.667	42.001	41.033	240.067
1st place, gold medalist(s)	Caio Souza	13.567	11.800	14.100	14.533	14.367	14.000	240.067
1st place, gold medalist(s)	Diogo Soares	12.400	13.767	13.133	14.067	14.267	14.033	240.067
1st place, gold medalist(s)	Tomás Florêncio	10.267	11.100	12.833	13.700	12.933	10.600	240.067
1st place, gold medalist(s)	Lucas Bitencourt				14.067	13.367	13.000	240.067
1st place, gold medalist(s)	Patrick Sampaio	12.633	11.133	12.833				240.067
2nd place, silver medalist(s)	Colombia	38.166	38.500	39.201	41.967	39.733	37.699	235.266
2nd place, silver medalist(s)	José Martínez	12.200	13.200	12.967	13.900	12.933	12.333	235.266
2nd place, silver medalist(s)	Dilan Jiménez	12.433	11.300	12.767	14.300	13.800	11.967	235.266
2nd place, silver medalist(s)	Jordan Castro	12.200	11.967	12.200	13.133	13.000	12.133	235.266
2nd place, silver medalist(s)	Andrés Martínez	13.533	13.333		13.767		13.233	235.266
2nd place, silver medalist(s)	Kristopher Bohórquez			13.467		11.633		235.266
3rd place, bronze medalist(s)	Argentina	39.634	37.167	40.133	41.200	38.667	38.433	235.234
3rd place, bronze medalist(s)	Julian Jato	13.700	12.167	12.767	13.567	13.333	12.833	235.234
3rd place, bronze medalist(s)	Santiago Mayol	12.467	12.167	12.933	13.500	12.767	12.367	235.234
3rd place, bronze medalist(s)	Santiago Agostinelli	13.467		13.367	13.900	12.567	11.067	235.234
3rd place, bronze medalist(s)	Daniel Villafañe	12.467	5.767	13.833	13.733			235.234
3rd place, bronze medalist(s)	Luca Alfieri		12.833			12.533	13.233	235.234
4	Chile	38.134	36.067	39.666	41.634	36.666	36.867	229.034
4	Luciano Letelier	13.667	12.967	12.333	13.033	12.300	14.000	229.034
4	Josué Armijo	11.967	10.433	10.700	13.867	12.133	11.800	229.034
4	Joel Álavarez		12.200	13.200	13.800	12.233	11.067	229.034
4	Joaquín Álvarez	12.500	10.900	14.133		11.867	11.067	229.034
4	Luciano Flores	11.000			13.967			229.034
5	Mexico	40.733	34.100	39.666	40.400	36.867	37.266	229.032
5	Ricardo Torres	13.600	11.067	13.000	13.500	12.433	12.133	229.032
5	Joseph Solís	11.000	11.700	13.533	13.467	12.167	12.700	229.032
5	Alejandro Yañez	13.000	10.667	11.800	12.700	12.267	11.033	229.032
5	Alonso Pérez	14.133	11.333		13.433			229.032
5	Cristian Ramírez			13.133		12.000	12.433	229.032
6	Puerto Rico	37.266	25.833	38.167	25.900	11.667	12.167	151.000
6	Jose Rosado	11.733	11.733	10.200	12.867	11.667	12.167	151.000
6	Pablo Pérez	13.733		12.500				151.000
6	José López			12.467	13.033		0.000	151.000
6	Francisco Vélez	11.800		13.200				151.000
6	Nelson Guilbe		14.100					151.000

=== All-around ===
Rank	Gymnast	Floor (gymnastics)	Pommel horse	Rings (gymnastics)	Vault (gymnastics)	Parallel bars	Horizontal bar	Total
1st place, gold medalist(s)	(Brazil) Caio Souza	13.200	12.633	13.967	14.100	13.867	13.367	81.134
2nd place, silver medalist(s)	(Chile) Luciano Letelier	13.433	13.000	12.700	13.700	12.433	13.967	79.233
3rd place, bronze medalist(s)	(Argentina) Santiago Mayol	13.567	13.033	12.833	13.600	13.233	12.300	78.566
4	(Colombia) Dilan Jiménez	13.000	11.867	12.800	13.967	13.100	12.733	77.467
5	(Ecuador) Cesar Lopez	12.300	12.100	13.467	13.900	13.100	12.500	76.767
6	(Brazil) Diogo Soares	13.333	11.933	13.133	13.700	11.400	13.233	76.732
7	(Mexico) Ricardo Torres	12.600	12.000	12.700	13.700	11.900	12.933	75.833
8	(Colombia) José Martínez	12.400	13.100	12.333	13.567	11.100	12.900	75.400
9	(Puerto Rico) Jose Rosado	12.200	11.133	12.367	12.467	11.100	12.200	71.467
10	(Costa Rica) Andres Valverde	12.500	12.000	10.200	12.867	11.867	11.833	71.267
11	(Ecuador) Johnny Valencia	12.667	11.167	11.600	13.700	9.300	11.367	69.801
12	(Cayman Islands) Karthik Adapa	11.600	6.833	10.833	11.400	11.200	11.033	62.899
13	(Mexico) Joseph Solís	DNS	8.033	13.233	12.200	12.000	8.833	54.299
-	(Argentina) Julian Jato	13.033	12.033	12.633	10.667	DNS	DNS	DNF

=== Floor exercise ===
Rank	Gymnast	D Score	E Score	Pen.	Total
1st place, gold medalist(s)	(Mexico) Alonso Pérez	5.6	8.200	-0.1	13.700
2nd place, silver medalist(s)	(Colombia) Andrés Martínez	5.6	7.733	-0.2	13.133
3rd place, bronze medalist(s)	(Argentina) Julian Jato	5.2	7.933	-0.1	13.033
4	(Mexico) Ricardo Torres	5.3	8.000	-0.3	13.000
5	(Puerto Rico) Pablo Pérez	5.7	7.400	-0.1	13.000
6	(Brazil) Caio Souza	5.5	7.567	-0.6	12.467
7	(Venezuela) Adickxon Trejo	4.8	7.533		12.333
8	(Chile) Luciano Letelier	5.6	6.367		11.967

=== Pommel horse ===
Rank	Gymnast	D Score	E Score	Pen.	Total
1st place, gold medalist(s)	(Brazil) Diogo Soares	5.8	8.133		13.933
2nd place, silver medalist(s)	(Peru) Edward Alarcón	5.1	8.200		13.300
3rd place, bronze medalist(s)	(Argentina) Luca Alfieri	5.0	8.200		13.200
4	(Chile) Luciano Atelier	4.7	8.367		13.067
5	(Puerto Rico) Nelson Guilbe	5.6	7.433		13.033
6	(Ecuador) Johnny Valencia	4.6	8.333		12.933
7	(Colombia) José Martínez	5.2	7.433		12.633
8	(Colombia) Andrés Martínez	5.1	6.733		11.833

=== Rings ===
Rank	Gymnast	D Score	E Score	Pen.	Total
1st place, gold medalist(s)	(Chile) Joaquín Álvarez	5.8	8.167		13.967
2nd place, silver medalist(s)	(Argentina) Daniel Villafañe	6.0	7.833		13.833
3rd place, bronze medalist(s)	(Brazil) Caio Souza	6.0	7.733		13.733
4	(Puerto Rico) Francisco Vélez	5.6	7.900		13.500
5	(Peru) Edward Alarcón	5.6	7.500		13.100
6	(Argentina) Santiago Agostinelli	5.4	7.667		13.067
7	(Mexico) Joseph Solís	5.5	7.100		12.600
8	(Colombia) Kristopher Bohórquez	5.2	7.300		12.500

=== Vault ===
Rank	Gymnast	Vault 1				Vault 2				Total
Rank	Gymnast	D Score	E Score	Pen.	Score 1	D Score	E Score	Pen.	Score 2	Total
1st place, gold medalist(s)	(Brazil) Caio Souza	5.6	9.000		14.600	5.6	7.900		13.500	14.050
2nd place, silver medalist(s)	(Colombia) Dilan Jiménez	5.2	9.233		14.433	4.0	9.333		13.333	13.883
3rd place, bronze medalist(s)	(Chile) Josué Armijo	4.8	9.100		13.900	4.8	9.000		13.800	13.850
4	(Ecuador) Cesar Lopez	4.8	9.200		14.000	4.0	9.433		13.433	13.717
5	(Puerto Rico) José López	5.2	8.000		13.200	5.2	8.933		14.133	13.667
6	(Argentina) Daniel Villafañe	5.2	8.933		14.133	5.2	8.000	-0.1	13.100	13.617
7	(Chile) Luciano Flores	5.2	8.933		14.133	5.2	7.800		13.000	13.567
8	(Mexico) Ricardo Torres	5.2	8.733	-0.3	13.633	4.0	9.167		13.167	13.400

=== Parallel bars ===
Rank	Gymnast	D Score	E Score	Pen.	Total
1st place, gold medalist(s)	(Colombia) Dilan Jiménez	5.9	8.433		14.333
2nd place, silver medalist(s)	(Brazil) Diogo Soares	5.9	8.100		14.000
3rd place, bronze medalist(s)	(Venezuela) Adickxon Trejo	5.3	8.500		13.800
4	(Brazil) Caio Souza	6.0	7.200		13.200
5	(Ecuador) Cesar Lopez	5.0	8.100		13.100
6	(Peru) Edward Alarcón	4.6	8.100		12.700
7	(Colombia) Jordan Castro	5.6	6.833		12.433
8	(Argentina) Julian Jato	5.0	6.767		11.767

=== Horizontal bar ===
Rank	Gymnast	D Score	E Score	Pen.	Total
1st place, gold medalist(s)	(Brazil) Diogo Soares	6.0	8.100		14.100
2nd place, silver medalist(s)	(Brazil) Caio Souza	6.3	7.400		13.700
3rd place, bronze medalist(s)	(Mexico) Joseph Solís	4.0	8.667		12.667
4	(Argentina) Luca Alfieri	4.9	7.633		12.533
5	(Mexico) Cristian Ramirez	4.6	7.500		12.100
6	(Colombia) Andrés Martínez	4.9	7.000		11.900
7	(Argentina) Julian Jato	4.4	7.200		11.600
8	(Chile) Luciano Letelier	4.9	6.333		11.233

== Women's results ==
=== Team ===
Rank	Team	Vault (gymnastics)	Uneven bars	Balance beam	Floor (gymnastics)	Total
1st place, gold medalist(s)	Brazil	39.233	37.967	38.234	37.900	153.334
1st place, gold medalist(s)	Andreza Lima	13.333	12.100	13.500	13.033	153.334
1st place, gold medalist(s)	Gabriela Barbosa	12.800	12.067	12.767	12.067	153.334
1st place, gold medalist(s)	Luiza Abel	13.100	12.700		11.000	153.334
1st place, gold medalist(s)	Carolyne Pedro	12.367	13.167	11.100		153.334
1st place, gold medalist(s)	Hellen Silva			11.967	12.800	153.334
2nd place, silver medalist(s)	Canada	39.566	37.634	36.733	36.500	150.433
2nd place, silver medalist(s)	Emma Spence	13.400	12.767	12.533	12.200	150.433
2nd place, silver medalist(s)	Sydney Turner	12.367	13.167	12.700	11.800	150.433
2nd place, silver medalist(s)	Denelle Pedrick	12.933	11.700	11.500	12.500	150.433
2nd place, silver medalist(s)	Tegan Shaver	13.233	11.667	10.400	11.633	150.433
3rd place, bronze medalist(s)	Mexico	39.333	35.934	36.566	38.267	150.100
3rd place, bronze medalist(s)	Michelle Pineda	13.333	12.867	13.133	13.200	150.100
3rd place, bronze medalist(s)	Valentina Meléndez	13.033	10.767	12.300	12.267	150.100
3rd place, bronze medalist(s)	Mariangela Flores	12.633	11.767	10.800	12.800	150.100
3rd place, bronze medalist(s)	Regina Collado	12.967		11.133		150.100
3rd place, bronze medalist(s)	Alondra Calderón		11.300	10.400		150.100
4	Argentina	38.700	35.600	36.834	37.633	148.767
4	Isabella Ajalla	12.833	11.367	12.800	11.433	148.767
4	Mia Mainardi	12.667	11.100	11.767	12.833	148.767
4	Milagros Curti	12.967		12.267	12.200	148.767
4	Meline Mesropian		13.133	11.233	12.600	148.767
4	Sira Macias	12.900	11.067			148.767
5	Panama	39.767	34.400	35.433	34.767	144.367
5	Karla Navas	13.567	12.000	12.133	11.733	144.367
5	Hillary Heron	13.500	11.700	11.967	11.067	144.367
5	Lana Herrera	12.700	9.433		11.967	144.367
5	Lucia Paulino	11.600		9.200	9.900	144.367
5	Victoria Castro		10.700	11.333		144.367
6	Colombia	38.533	34.433	34.467	34.901	142.334
6	Daira Lamadrid	11.567	13.233	10.867	11.367	142.334
6	Ginna Escobar	12.833	9.567	12.033	12.267	142.334
6	Juliana Ochoa	12.900		11.567	11.267	142.334
6	Angie Rodriguez	12.800	10.567		10.433	142.334
6	Jireth Gónzalez		10.633	10.567		142.334
7	Ecuador	37.966	35.033	33.100	35.600	141.699
7	Alaís Perea	12.900	12.400	12.433	11.867	141.699
7	Ashley Bohórquez	13.433	11.633	10.700	12.133	141.699
7	Fabiana Sadún	11.633	11.000	9.967	11.600	141.699
8	Costa Rica	37.066	34.433	34.100	35.000	140.599
8	Heika Salas	12.533	11.600	11.000	11.567	140.599
8	Franciny Morales	12.900	9.833	11.800	11.900	140.599
8	Mariana Andrade	11.633	12.100	11.300		140.599
8	Rachel Rodriguez	11.433	10.733		11.533	140.599
8	Daniela Casasola			9.333	8.233	140.599

=== All-around ===
Rank	Gymnast	Vault (gymnastics)	Uneven bars	Balance beam	Floor (gymnastics)	Total
1st place, gold medalist(s)	(Mexico) Michelle Pineda	13.533	12.833	13.267	12.867	52.500
2nd place, silver medalist(s)	(Argentina) Mia Mainardi	13.500	12.867	12.567	13.067	52.001
3rd place, bronze medalist(s)	(Brazil) Andreza Lima	13.333	12.600	13.100	12.533	51.566
4	(Canada) Emma Spence	13.467	12.733	12.667	12.667	51.534
5	(Brazil) Gabriela Barbosa	12.500	11.933	12.433	12.433	49.299
6	(Panama) Karla Navas	14.300	12.400	11.900	10.400	49.000
7	(Canada) Sydney Turner	12.867	11.900	11.833	11.933	48.533
8	(Panama) Hillary Heron	13.400	12.233	11.500	10.867	48.000
9	(Ecuador) Alaís Perea	12.800	11.000	12.333	11.767	47.900
10	(Ecuador) Ashley Bohórquez	13.467	11.767	10.100	12.067	47.401
11	(Mexico) Valentina Meléndez	12.600	10.900	11.933	11.700	47.133
12	(Colombia) Ginna Escobar	12.733	10.300	11.900	11.800	46.733
13	(Argentina) Isabella Ajalla	12.700	11.033	12.267	10.667	46.667
14	(Peru) Fabiola Diaz	12.667	9.767	12.600	11.333	46.367
15	(Jamaica) Alana Walker	13.100	11.600	10.200	11.467	46.367
16	(Venezuela) Milca Leon	12.433	11.800	10.833	11.033	46.099
17	(Jamaica) Isabelle David	13.200	10.000	10.900	11.767	45.867
18	(Haiti) Lynnzee Brown	11.267	11.300	11.267	11.767	45.601
19	(Colombia) Daira Lamadrid	11.833	12.900	9.567	11.067	45.367
20	(Peru) Ana Mendez	12.667	11.533	10.267	10.667	45.134
21	(El Salvador) Alexa Grande	12.733	10.500	11.667	9.433	44.333
22	(Costa Rica) Franciny Morales	12.833	11.567	10.433	9.267	44.100
23	(Puerto Rico) Karelys Diaz	11.100	11.500	10.000	10.467	43.067
24	(Costa Rica) Heika Salas	10.967	10.700	8.800	9.967	40.434

=== Vault ===
Rank	Gymnast	Vault 1				Vault 2				Total
Rank	Gymnast	D Score	E Score	Pen.	Score 1	D Score	E Score	Pen.	Score 2	Total
1st place, gold medalist(s)	(Panama) Karla Navas	4.6	8.933		13.533	5.2	9.000		14.200	13.867
2nd place, silver medalist(s)	(Panama) Hillary Heron	5.0	8.733		13.733	4.6	8.900		13.500	13.617
3rd place, bronze medalist(s)	(Canada) Emma Spence	4.6	9.000		13.600	3.4	8.567		11.967	12.784
4	(Ecuador) Ashley Bohórquez	4.6	8.633	-0.3	12.933	4.4	8.200		12.600	12.767
5	(Mexico) Valentina Meléndez	4.4	8.600		13.000	4.0	8.500		12.500	12.750
6	(Ecuador) Alaís Perea	4.2	8.800		13.000	3.8	8.567		12.367	12.684
7	(Costa Rica) Franciny Morales	4.2	8.667		12.867	3.6	8.433		12.233	12.550
8	(Mexico) Regina Collado	4.2	8.367		12.567	3.8	7.367		11.167	11.867

=== Uneven bars ===
Rank	Gymnast	D Score	E Score	Pen.	Total
1st place, gold medalist(s)	(Colombia) Daira Lamadrid	5.4	7.667		13.067
2nd place, silver medalist(s)	(Canada) Sydney Turner	5.1	7.933		13.033
3rd place, bronze medalist(s)	(Argentina) Meline Mesropian	5.2	7.700		12.900
4	(Mexico) Michelle Pineda	4.6	8.167		12.767
5	(Canada) Emma Spence	4.8	7.967		12.767
6	(Brazil) Luiza Abel	4.9	7.700		12.600
7	(Brazil) Carolyne Pedro	5.3	6.400		11.700
8	(Peru) Ana Mendez	4.6	6.800		11.300

=== Balance beam ===
Rank	Gymnast	D Score	E Score	Pen.	Total
1st place, gold medalist(s)	(Mexico) Michelle Pineda	5.0	8.367		13.367
2nd place, silver medalist(s)	(Brazil) Andreza Lima	5.8	7.367		13.167
3rd place, bronze medalist(s)	(Canada) Sydney Turner	5.0	7.967		12.967
4	(Canada) Emma Spence	5.1	7.733		12.833
5	(Brazil) Gabriela Barbosa	5.1	7.433		12.533
6	(Ecuador) Alaís Perea	4.9	7.267		12.167
7	(Argentina) Isabella Ajalla	5.5	6.367		11.867
8	(Mexico) Valentina Meléndez	4.8	5.667		10.467

=== Floor exercise ===
Rank	Gymnast	D Score	E Score	Pen.	Total
1st place, gold medalist(s)	(Argentina) Mia Mainardi	5.5	7.667		13.167
2nd place, silver medalist(s)	(Mexico) Michelle Pineda	5.1	8.000		13.100
2nd place, silver medalist(s)	(Brazil) Hellen Silva	5.1	8.000		13.100
4	(Canada) Denelle Pedrick	4.9	7.933		12.833
5	(Colombia) Ginna Escobar	4.6	7.600		12.200
6	(Brazil) Andreza Lima	4.9	7.133		12.033
7	(Mexico) Mariangela Flores	4.7	7.667	-0.4	11.967
8	(Argentina) Meline Mesropian	4.6	7.500	-0.3	11.800
