= Josiany Calixto =

Brazilian artistic gymnast (born 2007)

- Full name: Josiany Calixto da Silva
- Born: 1 August 2007 (age 19) Santo Antônio da Platina

Gymnastics career
- Discipline: Women's artistic gymnastics
- Country represented: Brazil (2021-present (BRA))
- Club: Centro de Excelência de Ginástica (CEGIN)
- Head coach: Iryna Ilyashenko
Medal record
Artistic gymnastics
Representing Brazil
Pan American Championships
Gold medal – first place	2024 Santa Marta	Team
South American Championships
Gold medal – first place	2023 Cali	Team
Gold medal – first place	2023 Cali	Uneven bars
Gold medal – first place	2023 Cali	Balance beam
Gold medal – first place	2024 Aracaju	Team
Silver medal – second place	2023 Cali	All-around
Junior Pan American Games
Silver medal – second place	2021 Cali	Team

Josiany Calixto da Silva (born 1 August 2007) is a Brazilian artistic gymnast and a member of the Brazilian national gymnastics team.

== Competitive history ==
Year	Event	Team	AA	VT	UB	BB	FX
Junior
2019	Brazilian Junior Championships (age 12–13)		2nd place, silver medalist(s)		2nd place, silver medalist(s)	1st place, gold medalist(s)	
2021	Brazilian Junior Championships				3rd place, bronze medalist(s)	1st place, gold medalist(s)	
2021	Brazilian Championships					1st place, gold medalist(s)	
2021	Junior Pan American Games	2nd place, silver medalist(s)					7
2022	South American Youth Games	1st place, gold medalist(s)	4		3rd place, bronze medalist(s)		
2022	Pan American Championships	4					
2022	Brazilian Championships	2nd place, silver medalist(s)	17		7	30	16
2022	Brazilian Junior Championships		3rd place, bronze medalist(s)		1st place, gold medalist(s)	3rd place, bronze medalist(s)	1st place, gold medalist(s)
2022	South American Junior Championships	1st place, gold medalist(s)	1st place, gold medalist(s)		1st place, gold medalist(s)	1st place, gold medalist(s)	
Senior
2023	DTB Pokal Mixed Cup	3rd place, bronze medalist(s)					
2023	Brazil Trophy				4		6
2023	Brazilian Championships	2nd place, silver medalist(s)	7		5	15	13
2023	South American Championships	1st place, gold medalist(s)	2nd place, silver medalist(s)		1st place, gold medalist(s)	1st place, gold medalist(s)	
2024
2024	Pan American Championships	1st place, gold medalist(s)					
2024	Brazil Trophy				5	7	7
2024	Brazilian Championships	2nd place, silver medalist(s)	14				R3
2024	South American Championships	1st place, gold medalist(s)			5	6	
