= 2023 in artistic gymnastics =

Below is a list of notable men's and women's artistic gymnastics international events held in 2023 as well as the medalists.

== Retirements ==
Gymnasts who announced retirements in 2023
Gymnast	Country	Date	Ref
Holly Jones	Great Britain	9 January 2023	
Ellie Downie	Great Britain	23 January 2023	
Claire Pontlevoy	France	1 February 2023	
Lara Mori	Italy	11 February 2023	
Abigail Magistrati	Argentina	1 March 2023	
Marcel Nguyen	Germany	14 March 2023	
Göksu Üçtaş Şanlı	Turkey	25 April 2023	
Ludovico Edalli	Italy	8 May 2023	
Koji Yamamuro	Japan	1 June 2023	
Jenna Lalonde	Canada	1 September 2023	
Kara Eaker	United States	20 October 2023	
Eddy Yusof	Switzerland	20 November 2023	
Fien Enghels	Belgium	7 December 2023	
Emelie Petz	Germany	20 December 2023	
Boglárka Dévai	Hungary	23 December 2023	

== Nationality changes ==
Gymnasts who changed nationalities in 2023
Gymnast	From	To	Ref
Dorien Motten	Belgium	Georgia	
Eddie Penev	United States	Bulgaria	
Caterina Cereghetti	Italy	Switzerland	
Ayelén Tarabini	Argentina	Kyrgyzstan	
Anya Pilgrim	United States	Barbados	
Paloma Mintcheva	United States	Bulgaria	
Emma Malabuyo	United States	Philippines	
Levi Ruivivar	United States	Philippines	
Georgia-Rose Brown	Australia	New Zealand	
David Martelli	Great Britain	Ireland	
Azaraya Ra-Akbar	United States	Canada	

== Calendar of events ==
Date	Location	Event	Men's winners	Women's winners
February 23–26	(Germany) Cottbus	FIG World Cup	FX: (Israel) Artem Dolgopyat; PH: (Uzbekistan) Abdulla Azimov; SR: (Greece) Eleftherios Petrounias; VT: (Armenia) Artur Davtyan; PB: (Ukraine) Illia Kovtun; HB: (Japan) Shohei Kawakami	VT: (Italy) Manila Esposito; UB: (Italy) Alice D'Amato; BB: (Japan) Mana Okamura; FX: (Japan) Kokofugata Azuki
March 1–4	(Qatar) Doha	FIG World Cup	FX: (Philippines) Carlos Yulo; PH: (Kazakhstan) Nariman Kurbanov; SR: (China) Liu Yang; VT: (Armenia) Artur Davtyan; PB: (Ukraine) Illia Kovtun; HB: (Japan) Yuya Kamoto	VT: (France) Coline Devillard; UB: (Ukraine) Anna Lashchevska; BB: (Romania) Sabrina Voinea; FX: (Romania) Sabrina Voinea
March 9–12	(Azerbaijan) Baku	FIG World Cup	FX: (Kazakhstan) Milad Karimi; PH: (Kazakhstan) Nariman Kurbanov; SR: (Azerbaijan) Nikita Simonov; VT: (Philippines) Carlos Yulo; PB: (Philippines) Carlos Yulo; HB: (Israel) Alexander Myakinin	VT: (France) Coline Devillard; UB: (China) Qiu Qiyuan; BB: (Italy) Giorgia Villa; FX: (France) Marine Boyer
March 29–April 2	(Turkey) Antalya	Junior World Championships	TF: Japan; AA: (China) Qin Guohuan; FX: (Colombia) Ángel Barajas; PH: (Armenia) Hamlet Manukyan; SR: (Armenia) Hamlet Manukyan; VT: (Italy) Tommaso Brugnami; PB: (Colombia) Ángel Barajas / Tomoharu Tsunogai; HB: Tomoharu Tsunogai	TF: Japan; AA: Haruka Nakamura; VT: (Argentina) Mia Mainardi; UB: (Italy) Caterina Gaddi; BB: (China) Yu Hanyue; FX: (Italy) Giulia Perotti
April 11–16	(Turkey) Antalya	European Championships	TF: Italy; AA: (Turkey) Adem Asil; FX: (United Kingdom) Luke Whitehouse; PH: (Republic of Ireland) Rhys McClenaghan; SR: (Turkey) Adem Asil; VT: (Armenia) Artur Davtyan; PB: (Ukraine) Illia Kovtun; HB: (Croatia) Tin Srbić	TF: Great Britain; AA: (United Kingdom) Jessica Gadirova; VT: (France) Coline Devillard; UB: (Italy) Alice D'Amato; BB: (Netherlands) Sanne Wevers; FX: (United Kingdom) Jessica Gadirova
April 27–30	(Egypt) Cairo	FIG World Cup	FX: (Ukraine) Illia Kovtun; PH: (Chinese Taipei) Lee Chih-kai; SR: (Azerbaijan) Nikita Simonov; VT: (Armenia) Artur Davtyan; PB: (Ukraine) Illia Kovtun; HB: (Ukraine) Illia Kovtun	VT: (United States) Joscelyn Roberson; UB: (Italy) Alice D'Amato; BB: (Italy) Giorgia Villa; FX: (United States) Joscelyn Roberson
May 6	(Australia) Carrara	Oceania Championships	TF: Australia; AA: (New Zealand) Mikhail Koudinov	TF: Australia; AA: Ruby Pass
May 5–17	(Cambodia) Phnom Penh	Southeast Asian Games	TF: Vietnam; AA: (Philippines) Carlos Yulo; FX: (Philippines) John Ivan Cruz; PH: Đặng Ngọc Xuân Thiện; SR: Nguyễn Văn Khánh Phong; VT: (Philippines) Juancho Miguel Besana; PB: (Philippines) Carlos Yulo; HB: Đinh Phương Thành	—N/a
May 25–28	(Bulgaria) Varna	FIG World Challenge Cup	FX: (Bulgaria) Eddie Penev; PH: (Albania) Matvei Petrov; SR: (Armenia) Artur Avetisyan; VT: (Armenia) Artur Davtyan; PB: (Uzbekistan) Rasuljon Abdurakhimov; HB: (Norway) Sofus Heggemsnes	VT: (Croatia) Tijana Korent; UB: (Hungary) Zsófia Kovács; BB: (Hungary) Bettina Lili Czifra; FX: (France) Silane Mielle
May 26–29	(Colombia) Medellín	Pan American Championships	TF: United States; AA: Yul Moldauer; FX: Yul Moldauer; PH: Khoi Young; SR: (Argentina) Daniel Villafañe; VT: (Brazil) Yuri Guimarães; PB: Yul Moldauer; HB: Curran Phillips	TF: United States; AA: (United States) Tiana Sumanasekera; VT: (Mexico) Alexa Moreno; UB: (United States) Nola Matthews; BB: (United States) Tiana Sumanasekera; FX: (United States) Joscelyn Roberson
May 26–27	(South Africa) Pretoria	African Championships	TF: Egypt; AA: Omar Mohamed	TF: South Africa; AA: (Algeria) Kaylia Nemour
June 1–4	(Israel) Tel Aviv	FIG World Challenge Cup	FX: (Hungary) Krisztofer Mészáros; PH: (Israel) Eyal Indig; SR: (Austria) Vinzenz Höck; VT: (Hungary) Krisztofer Mészáros; PB: (Turkey) Ahmet Önder; HB: (Spain) Néstor Abad	VT: (Australia) Georgia Godwin; UB: (Slovakia) Barbora Mokošová; BB: (France) Marine Boyer; FX: (Australia) Georgia Godwin
June 8–11	(Croatia) Osijek	FIG World Challenge Cup	FX: (Bulgaria) Eddie Penev; PH: (Armenia) Gagik Khachikyan; SR: (Armenia) Artur Avetisyan; VT: (Armenia) Artur Davtyan; PB: (Ukraine) Illia Kovtun; HB: (Brazil) Caio Souza	VT: (Australia) Georgia Godwin; UB: (Netherlands) Naomi Visser; BB: (Australia) Georgia Godwin; FX: (Australia) Georgia Godwin
June 10–18	(Singapore) Kallang	Asian Championships	TF: China; AA: (Japan) Shinnosuke Oka; FX: (Philippines) Carlos Yulo; PH: (Kazakhstan) Nariman Kurbanov; SR: Lan Xingyu; VT: (Philippines) Carlos Yulo; PB: (Philippines) Carlos Yulo; HB: Tian Hao	TF: China; AA: Qiu Qiyuan; VT: (South Korea) Yeo Seo-jeong; UB: Qiu Qiyuan; BB: Zhang Qingying; FX: Zhang Qingying
June 24–28	(El Salvador) San Salvador	Central American and Caribbean Games	TF: Mexico; AA: (Cuba) Diorges Escobar; FX: (CCS) Jorge Vega; PH: (Mexico) Isaac Núñez; SR: (Colombia) Kristopher Bohórquez; VT: (Dominican Republic) Audrys Nin Reyes; PB: (Mexico) Isaac Núñez; HB: (Cuba) Diorges Escobar	TF: Mexico; AA: (Panama) Karla Navas; VT: (Mexico) Alexa Moreno; UB: (Mexico) Paulina Campos; BB: (Mexico) Paulina Campos; FX: (Mexico) Alexa Moreno
July 31–August 4	(China) Chengdu	World University Games	TF: China; AA: Zhang Boheng; FX: (Japan) Kazuma Kaya; PH: (Chinese Taipei) Lee Chih-kai; SR: Lan Xingyu; VT: (Ukraine) Nazar Chepurnyi; PB: Zou Jingyuan; HB: (Kazakhstan) Milad Karimi	TF: China; AA: Ou Yushan; VT: (Japan) Shoko Miyata; UB: Du Siyu; BB: Ou Yushan; FX: Ou Yushan
September 1–3	(Turkey) Mersin	FIG World Challenge Cup	FX: (Turkey) Ahmet Önder; PH: (Jordan) Ahmad Abu Al-Soud; SR: (Azerbaijan) Nikita Simonov; VT: (Ukraine) Nazar Chepurnyi; PB: (Ukraine) Oleg Verniaiev; HB: (Turkey) Ahmet Önder	VT: (Uzbekistan) Oksana Chusovitina; UB: (Ukraine) Anna Lashchevska; BB: (Ukraine) Anna Lashchevska; FX: (Turkey) Sevgi Kayisoglu
September 8–10	(Hungary) Szombathely	FIG World Challenge Cup	FX: (Hungary) Krisztofer Mészáros; PH: (Albania) Matvei Petrov; SR: (Austria) Vinzenz Höck; VT: (Ukraine) Nazar Chepurnyi; PB: (Ukraine) Oleg Verniaiev; HB: (Cyprus) Ilias Georgiou	VT: (Hungary) Gréta Mayer; UB: (Hungary) Zója Székely; BB: (Ukraine) Anna Lashchevska; FX: (Czech Republic) Soňa Artamonova
September 8–10	(Colombia) Cali	South American Championships	TF: Brazil; AA: Gabriel Faria; FX: (Colombia) Andrés Martínez; PH: (Peru) Edward González; SR: (Colombia) Dilan Jiménez; VT: (Colombia) Juan Larrahondo; PB: (Colombia) Dilan Jiménez; HB: Lucas Bitencourt	TF: Brazil; AA: (Brazil) Gabriela Barbosa; VT: (Panama) Hillary Heron; UB: (Brazil) Josiany Calixto; BB: (Brazil) Josiany Calixto; FX: (Brazil) Rafaela Oliva
September 16–17	(France) Paris	FIG World Challenge Cup	FX: (Japan) Hiramatsu Koga; PH: (United Kingdom) Max Whitlock; SR: (Italy) Salvatore Maresca / (United Kingdom) Courtney Tulloch; VT: (United Kingdom) Harry Hepworth; PB: (Germany) Lukas Dauser; HB: (Chinese Taipei) Tang Chia-hung	VT: (Mexico) Alexa Moreno; UB: (France) Mélanie de Jesus dos Santos; BB: (France) Marine Boyer; FX: (France) Mélanie de Jesus dos Santos
September 24–29	(China) Hangzhou	Asian Games	TF: China; AA: (China) Zhang Boheng; FX: (South Korea) Kim Han-sol; PH: (Chinese Taipei) Lee Chih-kai; SR: (China) Lan Xingyu; VT: (Japan) Wataru Tanigawa; PB: (China) Zou Jingyuan; HB: (China) Zhang Boheng	TF: China; AA: (China) Zuo Tong; VT: (North Korea) An Chang-ok; UB: (North Korea) An Chang-ok; BB: (Japan) Mana Okamura; FX: (China) Zhang Jin
September 30–October 8	(Belgium) Antwerp	World Championships	TF: Japan; AA: (Japan) Daiki Hashimoto; FX: (Israel) Artem Dolgopyat; PH: (Republic of Ireland) Rhys McClenaghan; SR: (China) Liu Yang; VT: (United Kingdom) Jake Jarman; PB: (Germany) Lukas Dauser; HB: (Japan) Daiki Hashimoto	TF: United States; AA: (United States) Simone Biles; VT: (Brazil) Rebeca Andrade; UB: (China) Qiu Qiyuan; BB: (United States) Simone Biles; FX: (United States) Simone Biles
October 21–25	(Chile) Santiago	Pan American Games	TF: United States; AA: (Canada) Félix Dolci; FX: (Canada) Félix Dolci; PH: (Canada) Zachary Clay; SR: (United States) Donnell Whittenburg; VT: (Dominican Republic) Audrys Nin Reyes; PB: (United States) Curran Phillips; HB: (Brazil) Arthur Mariano	TF: United States; AA: (United States) Kayla DiCello; VT: (Brazil) Rebeca Andrade; UB: (United States) Zoe Miller; BB: (Brazil) Rebeca Andrade; FX: (United States) Kaliya Lincoln
November 24–26	(Sweden) Halmstad	Northern European Gymnastics Championships	TF: Sweden; AA: (Finland) Elias Koski; FX: (Finland) Marcus Pietarinen; PH: (Finland) Elias Koski; SR: (Sweden) Luis Il-Sung Melander; VT: (Norway) Jacob Gudim Karlsen; PB: (Finland) Elias Koski; HB: (Finland) Elias Koski	TF: Wales; AA: (Wales) Ruby Evans; VT: (Wales) Emily Roper; UB: (Iceland) Thelma Aðalsteinsdóttir; BB: (Republic of Ireland) Lily Russell; FX: (Wales) Ruby Evans

== Medalists ==
=== Women ===
==== International ====
Competition	Event	Gold	Silver	Bronze
World Championships	Team	United States	Brazil	France
World Championships	All-Around	(United States) Simone Biles	(Brazil) Rebeca Andrade	(United States) Shilese Jones
World Championships	Vault	(Brazil) Rebeca Andrade	(United States) Simone Biles	(South Korea) Yeo Seo-jeong
World Championships	Uneven Bars	(China) Qiu Qiyuan	(Algeria) Kaylia Nemour	(United States) Shilese Jones
World Championships	Balance Beam	(United States) Simone Biles	(China) Zhou Yaqin	(Brazil) Rebeca Andrade
World Championships	Floor Exercise	(United States) Simone Biles	(Brazil) Rebeca Andrade	(Brazil) Flávia Saraiva
Junior World Championships	Team	Japan	United States	Italy
Junior World Championships	All-Around	(Japan) Haruka Nakamura	(Japan) Sara Yamaguchi	(Italy) Caterina Gaddi
Junior World Championships	Vault	(Argentina) Mia Mainardi	(Italy) July Marano	(France) Ming van Eijken
Junior World Championships	Uneven Bars	(Italy) Caterina Gaddi	(Germany) Helen Kevric	(Italy) Giulia Perotti
Junior World Championships	Balance Beam	(China) Yu Hanyue	(Romania) Gabriela Vănoagă	(Canada) Cristella Brunetti-Burns
Junior World Championships	Floor Exercise	(Italy) Giulia Perotti	(United States) Hezly Rivera	(Japan) Haruka Nakamura

==== Continental Championships ====
Competition	Event	Gold	Silver	Bronze
European Championships	Team	Great Britain	Italy	Netherlands
European Championships	All-Around	(United Kingdom) Jessica Gadirova	(Hungary) Zsófia Kovács	(Italy) Alice D'Amato
European Championships	Vault	(France) Coline Devillard	(Italy) Asia D'Amato	(Belgium) Lisa Vaelen
European Championships	Uneven Bars	(Italy) Alice D'Amato	(United Kingdom) Becky Downie	(Germany) Elisabeth Seitz
European Championships	Balance Beam	(Netherlands) Sanne Wevers	(Italy) Manila Esposito	(Hungary) Zsófia Kovács
European Championships	Floor Exercise	(United Kingdom) Jessica Gadirova	(United Kingdom) Alice Kinsella	(Romania) Sabrina Voinea
Oceania Championships	Team	Australia	New Zealand	—N/a
Oceania Championships	All-Around	(Australia) Ruby Pass	(New Zealand) Reece Cobb	(Australia) Macy Pegoli
Asian Championships	Team	China	South Korea	Chinese Taipei
Asian Championships	All-Around	(China) Qiu Qiyuan	(China) Zhang Qingying	(South Korea) Shin Sol-yi
Asian Championships	Vault	(South Korea) Yeo Seo-jeong	(Uzbekistan) Oksana Chusovitina	(Philippines) Aleah Finnegan
Asian Championships	Uneven Bars	(China) Qiu Qiyuan	(South Korea) Lee Yun-seo	(China) Zuo Tong
Asian Championships	Balance Beam	(China) Zhang Qingying	(China) Zhang Xinyi	(Philippines) Aleah Finnegan
Asian Championships	Floor Exercise	(China) Zhang Qingying	(Philippines) Emma Malabuyo	(South Korea) Shin Sol-yi
African Championships	Team	South Africa	Egypt	Algeria
African Championships	All-Around	(Algeria) Kaylia Nemour	(South Africa) Caitlin Rooskrantz	(Egypt) Jana Abdelsalam
Pan American Championships	Team	United States	Mexico	Canada
Pan American Championships	All-Around	(United States) Tiana Sumanasekera	(Mexico) Natalia Escalera	(Canada) Aurélie Tran
Pan American Championships	Vault	(Mexico) Alexa Moreno	(United States) Joscelyn Roberson	(Mexico) Natalia Escalera
Pan American Championships	Uneven Bars	(United States) Nola Matthews	(United States) Addison Fatta	(Mexico) Natalia Escalera
Pan American Championships	Balance Beam	(United States) Tiana Sumanasekera	(United States) Joscelyn Roberson	(Canada) Aurélie Tran
Pan American Championships	Floor Exercise	(United States) Joscelyn Roberson	(United States) Tiana Sumanasekera	(Mexico) Natalia Escalera

=== Men ===
==== International ====
Competition	Event	Gold	Silver	Bronze
World Championships	Team	Japan	China	United States
World Championships	All-Around	(Japan) Daiki Hashimoto	(Ukraine) Illia Kovtun	(United States) Fred Richard
World Championships	Floor Exercise	(Israel) Artem Dolgopyat	(Japan) Kazuki Minami	(Kazakhstan) Milad Karimi
World Championships	Pommel Horse	(Republic of Ireland) Rhys McClenaghan	(United States) Khoi Young	(Jordan) Ahmad Abu Al-Soud
World Championships	Rings	(China) Liu Yang	(Greece) Eleftherios Petrounias	(China) You Hao
World Championships	Vault	(United Kingdom) Jake Jarman	(United States) Khoi Young	(Ukraine) Nazar Chepurnyi
World Championships	Parallel Bars	(Germany) Lukas Dauser	(China) Shi Cong	(Japan) Kaito Sugimoto
World Championships	Horizontal Bar	(Japan) Daiki Hashimoto	(Croatia) Tin Srbić	(China) Su Weide
Junior World Championships	Team	Japan	China	Italy
Junior World Championships	All-Around	(China) Qin Guohuan	(Colombia) Ángel Barajas	(Italy) Riccardo Villa
Junior World Championships	Floor Exercise	(Colombia) Ángel Barajas	(Germany) Timo Eder	(Italy) Tomasso Brugnami
Junior World Championships	Pommel Horse	(Armenia) Hamlet Manukyan	(Armenia) Mamikon Khachatryan	(Kazakhstan) Zeinolla Idrissov
Junior World Championships	Rings	(Armenia) Hamlet Manukyan	(Japan) Masaharu Tanida	(Italy) Riccardo Villa
Junior World Championships	Vault	(Italy) Tommaso Brugnami	(Canada) Victor Canuel	(Hungary) Szilard Zavory
Junior World Championships	Parallel Bars	(Colombia) Ángel Barajas (Japan) Tomoharu Tsunogai	Not awarded	(Egypt) Yahia Zakaria
Junior World Championships	Horizontal Bar	(Japan) Tomoharu Tsunogai	(China) He Xiang	(Colombia) Ángel Barajas

==== Continental Championships ====
Competition	Event	Gold	Silver	Bronze
European Championships	Team	Italy	Turkey	Great Britain
European Championships	All-Around	(Turkey) Adem Asil	(United Kingdom) Jake Jarman	(Ukraine) Illia Kovtun
European Championships	Floor Exercise	(United Kingdom) Luke Whitehouse	(Israel) Artem Dolgopyat	(Germany) Milan Hosseini
European Championships	Pommel Horse	(Republic of Ireland) Rhys McClenaghan	(Belgium) Maxime Gentges	(Armenia) Artur Davtyan
European Championships	Rings	(Turkey) Adem Asil	(Armenia) Vahagn Davtyan	(Greece) Eleftherios Petrounias
European Championships	Vault	(Armenia) Artur Davtyan	(United Kingdom) Jake Jarman	(Ukraine) Igor Radivilov
European Championships	Parallel Bars	(Ukraine) Illia Kovtun	(Turkey) Ferhat Arıcan	(Spain) Thierno Diallo
European Championships	Horizontal Bar	(Croatia) Tin Srbić	(Italy) Carlo Macchini	(Ukraine) Illia Kovtun
Oceania Championships	Team	Australia	New Zealand	—N/a
Oceania Championships	All-Around	(New Zealand) Mikhail Koudinov	(Australia) Clay Stephens	(Australia) James Hardy
Asian Championships	Team	China	Japan	Kazakhstan
Asian Championships	All-Around	(Japan) Shinnosuke Oka	(Philippines) Carlos Yulo	(Japan) Takeru Kitazono
Asian Championships	Floor Exercise	(Philippines) Carlos Yulo	(Kazakhstan) Dmitriy Patanin	(China) Su Weide
Asian Championships	Pommel Horse	(Kazakhstan) Nariman Kurbanov	(Jordan) Ahmad Abu Al-Soud	(Japan) Ryota Tsumura
Asian Championships	Rings	(China) Lan Xingyu	(Vietnam) Nguyễn Văn Khánh Phong	(Hong Kong) Ng Kiu Chung
Asian Championships	Vault	(Philippines) Carlos Yulo	(Uzbekistan) Abdulaziz Mirvaliev	(South Korea) Kim Jae-ho
Asian Championships	Parallel Bars	(Philippines) Carlos Yulo	(Japan) Shinnosuke Oka	(China) Yin Dehang
Asian Championships	Horizontal Bar	(China) Tian Hao	(Japan) Shinnosuke Oka	(Philippines) Carlos Yulo
African Championships	Team	Egypt	Algeria	Morocco
African Championships	All-Around	(Egypt) Omar Mohamed	(Egypt) Mohamed Afify	(Algeria) Hillal Metidji
Pan American Championships	Team	United States	Canada	Brazil
Pan American Championships	All-Around	(United States) Yul Moldauer	(United States) Shane Wiskus	(Brazil) Yuri Guimarães
Pan American Championships	Floor Exercise	(United States) Yul Moldauer	(Brazil) Yuri Guimarães	(United States) Shane Wiskus
Pan American Championships	Pommel Horse	(United States) Khoi Young	(Puerto Rico) Nelson Guilbe	(United States) Yul Moldauer
Pan American Championships	Rings	(Argentina) Daniel Villafañe	(Canada) William Emard	(Cuba) Alejandro de la Cruz
Pan American Championships	Vault	(Brazil) Yuri Guimarães	(Chile) Ignacio Varas	(Dominican Republic) Leandro Peña
Pan American Championships	Parallel Bars	(United States) Yul Moldauer	(United States) Shane Wiskus	(Colombia) Dilan Jiménez
Pan American Championships	Horizontal Bar	(United States) Curran Phillips	(United States) Yul Moldauer	(Chile) Luciano Letelier

== Season's best international scores ==
Note: Only the scores of senior gymnasts from international events have been included below. Only one score per gymnast is included.

=== Women ===
==== All-around ====
Rank	Name	Country	Score	Event
1	Simone Biles	United States	58.865	World Championships QF
2	Rebeca Andrade	Brazil	57.099	World Championships TF
3	Shilese Jones	United States	56.932	World Championships QF
4	Jessica Gadirova	Great Britain	56.766	World Championships QF
5	Mélanie de Jesus dos Santos	France	56.500	World Championships TF
6	Flávia Saraiva	Brazil	55.532	World Championships TF
7	Zsófia Kovács	Hungary	55.231	European Championships QF
8	Ou Yushan	China	55.198	World University Games QF
9	Ellie Black	Canada	55.065	World Championships QF
10	Qiu Qiyuan	China	54.932	Asian Championships AA
11	Alice D'Amato	Italy	54.899	European Championships QF
12	Manila Esposito	Italy	54.866	World Championships TF
13	Kayla DiCello	United States	54.699	Pan American Games AA
14	Jordan Chiles	United States	54.666	Pan American Games QF
15	Shoko Miyata	Japan	54.600	World University Games QF
16	Leanne Wong	United States	54.398	World Championships QF
17	Naomi Visser	Netherlands	54.332	World Championships QF
18	Zhang Jin	China	54.266	Asian Games AA
19	Ayaka Sakaguchi	Japan	54.198	World University Games QF
20	Lisa Vaelen	Belgium	54.099	European Championships AA

==== Vault ====
Rank	Name	Country	Score	Event
1	Rebeca Andrade	Brazil	14.983	Pan American Games EF
2	Simone Biles	United States	14.949	World Championships QF
3	Yeo Seo-jeong	South Korea	14.516	World Championships QF
4	Jessica Gadirova	Great Britain	14.416	World Championships QF
5	Alexa Moreno	Mexico	14.166	World Championships EF
6	Jordan Chiles	United States	14.150	Pan American Games EF
7	Joscelyn Roberson	United States	14.083	DTB Pokal Team Challenge
8	An Chang-ok	North Korea	14.049	Asian Games EF
9	Asia D'Amato	Italy	14.016	Cairo World Cup QF
10	Ellie Black	Canada	13.933	World Championships EF

==== Uneven bars ====
Rank	Name	Country	Score	Event
1	Qiu Qiyuan	China	15.233	Asian Championships AA
2	Kaylia Nemour	Algeria	15.200	World Championships AA
3	Zoe Miller	United States	14.850	DTB Pokal Team Challenge
4	Shilese Jones	United States	14.833	World Championships QF
5	Huang Zhuofan	China	14.766	World Championships EF
6	Alice D'Amato	Italy	14.750	City of Jesolo Trophy EF
7	Mélanie de Jesus dos Santos	France	14.700	Paris World Challenge Cup EF
8	Elisabeth Seitz	Germany	14.633	DTB Pokal Mixed Cup
9	Rebeca Andrade	Brazil	14.600	Paris World Challenge Cup EF
10	Naomi Visser	Netherlands	14.566	Osijek World Challenge Cup QF

==== Balance beam ====
Rank	Name	Country	Score	Event
1	Zhang Qingying	China	14.833	Asian Championships AA
2	Simone Biles	United States	14.800	World Championships EF
3	Zhou Yaqin	China	14.700	World Championships EF
4	Rebeca Andrade	Brazil	14.300	World Championships EF
5	Flávia Saraiva	Brazil	14.166	Pan American Games AA
5	Ou Yushan	China	14.166	World University Games AA
7	Manila Esposito	Italy	14.150	Swiss Cup
8	Breanna Scott	Australia	14.133	Oceania Championships AA
8	Mana Okamura	Japan	14.133	Cottbus World Cup EF
10	Sanne Wevers	Netherlands	14.100	World Championships EF

==== Floor exercise ====
Rank	Name	Country	Score	Event
1	Simone Biles	United States	15.166	World Championships TF
2	Rebeca Andrade	Brazil	14.666	World Championships TF
3	Jessica Gadirova	Great Britain	14.533	World Championships TF
4	Kaliya Lincoln	United States	14.233	Pan American Games EF
5	Joscelyn Roberson	United States	14.150	DTB Pokal Team Challenge
6	Manila Esposito	Italy	14.000	City of Jesolo Trophy AA
7	Flávia Saraiva	Brazil	13.966	World Championships EF
8	Ou Yushan	China	13.866	World University Games EF
9	Georgia Godwin	Australia	13.833	Osijek World Challenge Cup QF
10	Zhou Yaqin	China	13.833	World Championships TF

=== Men ===
==== All-around ====
Rank	Name	Country	Score	Event
1	Zhang Boheng	China	89.299	Asian Games AA
2	Daiki Hashimoto	Japan	88.698	World University Games QF
3	Takeru Kitazono	Japan	86.065	Asian Games AA
4	Shi Cong	China	86.398	World University Games AA
5	Shinnosuke Oka	Japan	86.065	Asian Championships AA
6	Sun Wei	China	86.064	World Championships TF
7	Carlos Yulo	Philippines	85.930	Asian Championships AA
8	Kenta Chiba	Japan	85.799	World Championships QF
9	Kazuma Kaya	Japan	85.598	World Championships QF
10	Illia Kovtun	Ukraine	85.432	European Championships QF
11	Adem Asil	Turkey	84.965	European Championships AA
12	Lan Xingyu	China	84.965	Asian Games AA
13	Shohei Kawakami	Japan	84.432	Asian Games QF
14	Fred Richard	United States	84.332	World Championships AA
15	Milad Karimi	Kazakhstan	84.331	World University Games QF
16	Yul Moldauer	United States	84.200	Pan American Championships AA
17	Jake Jarman	Great Britain	84.031	World Championships QF
18	Tian Hao	China	83.631	Asian Championships AA
18	James Hall	Great Britain	83.631	World Championships QF
20	Asher Hong	United States	83.500	DTB Pokal Team Challenge

==== Floor exercise ====
Rank	Name	Country	Score	Event
1	Carlos Yulo	Philippines	15.300	Asian Championships EF
2	Artem Dolgopyat	Israel	15.200	World Championships QF
3	Zhang Boheng	China	14.933	Asian Games QF
4	Luke Whitehouse	Great Britain	14.900	European Championships EF
4	Ryosuke Doi	Japan	14.900	DTB PokalTeam Challenge
4	Kim Han-sol	South Korea	14.900	Asian Games EF
7	Krisztofer Mészáros	Hungary	14.850	Innsbruck Friendly
8	Su Weide	China	14.766	Asian Championships AA
9	Kazuki Minami	Japan	14.733	World University Games QF
10	Daiki Hashimoto	Japan	14.733	World University Games QF

==== Pommel horse ====
Rank	Name	Country	Score	Event
1	Lee Chih-kai	Chinese Taipei	15.500	World University Games EF
2	Nariman Kurbanov	Kazakhstan	15.400	Doha World Cup EF
3	Max Whitlock	Great Britain	15.266	World Championships TF
4	Ahmad Abu al Soud	Jordan	15.233	Asian Championships QF
4	Ryota Tsumura	Japan	15.233	Asian Championships AA
6	Rhys McClenaghan	Ireland	15.100	World Championships EF
7	Khoi Young	United States	15.066	World Championships QF
7	Shiao Yu-jan	Chinese Taipei	15.066	Asian Games EF
9	Daiki Hashimoto	Japan	15.033	World University Games QF
10	Gagik Khachikyan	Armenia	15.000	Cottbus World Cup QF

==== Rings ====
Rank	Name	Country	Score	Event
1	Lan Xingyu	China	15.433	Asian Games EF
2	Liu Yang	China	15.366	Doha World Cup EF
3	Zou Jingyuan	China	15.266	World University Games EF
4	Eleftherios Petrounias	Greece	15.066	World Championships EF
5	Adem Asil	Turkey	15.033	European Championships AA
6	Nikita Simonov	Azerbaijan	14.966	World University Games QF
7	Zhang Boheng	China	14.933	Asian Games AA
8	You Hao	China	14.866	World Championships TF
9	Artur Avetisyan	Armenia	14.833	World University Games EF
10	Vahagn Davtyan	Armenia	14.733	European Championships EF

==== Vault ====
Rank	Name	Country	Score	Event
1	Artur Davtyan	Armenia	15.166	Cairo World Cup EF
2	Wataru Tanigawa	Japan	15.033	Asian Games QF
3	Jake Jarman	Great Britain	15.016	European Championships EF
4	Mahdi Olfati	Iran	14.983	Cottbus World Cup EF
5	Carlos Yulo	Philippines	14.933	Baku World Cup EF
6	Harry Hepworth	Great Britain	14.925	DTB Pokal Team Challenge
7	Igor Radivilov	Ukraine	14.889	Doha World Cup EF
8	Nazar Chepurnyi	Ukraine	14.883	World University Games EF
9	Asher Hong	United States	14.875	DTK Pokal Team Challenge
10	Khoi Young	United States	14.849	World Championships EF

==== Parallel bars ====
Rank	Name	Country	Score	Event
1	Zou Jingyuan	China	16.066	World University Games EF
2	Curran Phillips	United States	15.500	Baku World Cup QF
3	Zhang Boheng	China	15.466	Asian Games QF
4	Illia Kovtun	Ukraine	15.433	European Championships AA
5	Lukas Dauser	Germany	15.400	World Championships AA
5	Carlos Yulo	Philippines	15.400	Baku World Cup EF
7	Yul Moldauer	United States	15.350	Swiss Cup
8	Takeru Kitazono	Japan	15.300	Asian Games AA
9	Matteo Levantesi	Italy	15.266	Cottbus World Cup EF
10	Kazuma Kaya	Japan	15.250	Swiss Cup

==== Horizontal bar ====
Rank	Name	Country	Score	Event
1	Daiki Hashimoto	Japan	15.266	World University Games QF
2	Zhang Boheng	China	15.233	World University Games QF
3	Shi Cong	China	15.200	World University Games QF
4	Tian Hao	China	15.100	Asian Championships AA
5	Su Weide	China	14.800	Asian Championships AA
5	Milad Karimi	Kazakhstan	14.800	World University Games EF
5	Lin Chaopan	China	14.800	Asian Games EF
8	Shohei Kawakami	Japan	14.700	World University Games QF
8	Tin Srbić	Croatia	14.700	World Championships EF
10	Ryosuke Doi	Japan	14.600	DTB Pokal Mixed Cup
