= 2022 World Athletics U20 Championships – Women's 100 metres hurdles =

Women's 100 metres hurdles at the 2022 World Athletics U20 Championships
- Venue: Estadio Olímpico Pascual Guerrero
- Dates: 4 August (heats); 5 August (semifinals); 6 August (final)
- Competitors: 43 from 30 nations
- Winning time: 12.77

Medalists
gold medal	Kerrica Hill	Jamaica
silver medal	Alexis James	Jamaica
bronze medal	Anna Tóth	Hungary

The women's 100 metres hurdles at the 2022 World Athletics U20 Championships was held at the Estadio Olímpico Pascual Guerrero on 4–6 August 2022.

53 athletes from 33 countries were entered to the competition.

== Records ==
U20 standing records prior to the 2022 World Athletics U20 Championships were as follows:

Record	Athlete & Nationality	Mark	Location	Date
World U20 Record	Britany Anderson (JAM)	12.71	Joensuu, Finland	24 July 2019
Championship Record	Elvira Herman (BLR)	12.85	Bydgoszcz, Poland	24 July 2016
World U20 Leading	Kerrica Hill (JAM)	12.96	Kingston, Jamaica	26 June 2022

== Results ==
=== Round 1 ===
Qualification: First 3 of each heat (Q) and the 6 fastest times (q) qualified for the semifinals.

Rank	Heat	Lane	Name	Nationality	Time	Note
1	5	3	Alexis James	Jamaica	13.04	Q, PB
2	1	7	Kerrica Hill	Jamaica	13.30	Q
3	3	5	Hawa Jalloh	Germany	13.30	Q
4	4	3	Jalaysiya Smith	United States	13.42	Q
5	2	4	Dina Aulia	Indonesia	13.44	Q, NU20R
6	5	8	Naomi Krebs	Germany	13.45	Q, PB
7	6	3	Paula Blanquer	Spain	13.47	Q
8	6	5	Anna Tóth	Hungary	13.49	Q
9	3	4	Mia McIntosh	Great Britain	13.51	Q
10	1	1	Ester Bendová	Czech Republic	13.54	Q
11	2	6	Eddiyah Frye	United States	13.57	Q
12	2	7	Nandini Agasara	India	13.58	Q, NU20R
13	2	8	Marli Jessop	Great Britain	13.60	q
14	4	4	Vilma Väliharju	Finland	13.64	Q, PB
15	1	3	Iulia Dariana Grigoroiu	Romania	13.65	Q, PB
16	6	7	Vilma Itälinna	Finland	13.65	Q, PB
17	2	5	Cosmina Denisa Balaban	Romania	13.66	q, PB
18	3	2	Valérie Guignard	Switzerland	13.67	Q, PB
19	4	8	Lena Spazirer	Austria	13.75	Q, PB
20	6	8	Lovise Skarbøvik Andresen	Norway	13.78	q
21	4	6	Anna Maria Millend	Estonia	13.80	q
22	2	3	Josefina Maria Biernacki	Norway	13.81	q
23	4	5	Gabija Klimukaitė	Lithuania	13.82	q, PB
24	6	6	Alina Frei	Switzerland	13.84	
25	6	2	Lucija Grd	Croatia	13.89	PB
26	5	4	Giovana Corradi	Brazil	13.90	Q
27	1	2	Linoy Levy	Israel	13.91	
28	5	5	Lucy Mcglynn	Ireland	13.92	PB
29	5	7	Annika Haldbo	Denmark	13.95	
30	1	4	Lidiya Podtsepkina	Uzbekistan	13.95	
31	1	6	Lays Cristina Rodrigues Silva	Brazil	14.04	
32	2	2	Shir Karnivsky	Israel	14.06	
33	4	2	Mila Compaan	South Africa	14.07	PB
34	5	2	Neža Dolenc	Slovenia	14.11	
35	3	8	Hava Deliu	Greece	14.24	
36	1	8	Unnathi Aiyappa Bolland	India	14.28	
37	4	7	Delta Amidzovski	Australia	14.47	
38	6	4	Glódis Edda Þuríðardóttir	Iceland	14.53	
39	3	6	Sandra Milena Ferrari	Italy	14.72	
40	5	6	Michaela Molnárová	Slovakia	15.12	
41	1	5	Natasha Gertenbach	South Africa	39.32	
	3	7	María Alejandra Murillo	Colombia	DQ	TR17.6
	3	3	Emelia Surch	Australia	DQ	TR22.6.2

=== Semifinals ===
The semi-final took place on 5 August, with the 24 athletes involved being split into 3 heats of 8 athletes each. The first 2 athletes in each heat ( Q ) and the next 2 fastest ( q ) qualified to the final. The overall results were as follows:

Wind:
Heat 1: +0.2 m/s, Heat 2: 0.0 m/s, Heat 3: +0.4 m/s

Rank	Heat	Name	Nationality	Time	Note
1	2	Kerrica Hill	Jamaica	12.87	Q, WU20L
2	3	Alexis James	Jamaica	12.94	Q, PB
3	2	Anna Tóth	Hungary	13.16	NU20R
4	1	Jalaysiya Smith	United States	13.20	Q
5	1	Hawa Jalloh	Germany	13.33	Q
6	3	Paula Blanquer	Spain	13.34	Q, NU20R
7	3	Nandini Agasara	India	13.34	q, NU20R
8	1	Valérie Guignard	Switzerland	13.41	q, PB
9	2	Dina Aulia	Indonesia	13.44	NU20R
10	3	Marli Jessop	Great Britain	13.48	
11	2	Iulia Dariana Grigoroiu	Romania	13.61	PB
12	3	Vilma Väliharju	Finland	13.63	PB
13	1	Anna Maria Millend	Estonia	13.65	
14	3	Naomi Krebs	Germany	13.80	
15	1	Cosmina Denisa Balaban	Romania	13.83	
16	2	Eddiyah Frye	United States	13.92	
17	3	Giovana Corradi	Brazil	13.94	
18	2	Lena Spazirer	Austria	13.98	
19	2	Gabija Klimukaitė	Lithuania	14.34	
	3	Josefina Maria Biernacki	Norway	DNF	
	2	Lovise Skarbøvik Andresen	Norway	DNF	
	1	Ester Bendová	Czech Republic	DQ	
	1	Vilma Itälinna	Finland	DQ	
	1	Mia McIntosh	Great Britain	DNS	

=== Final ===
The final started at 15:42 on 6 August. The results were as follows:

Rank	Name	Nationality	Time	Note
1	Kerrica Hill	Jamaica	12.77	CR
2	Alexis James	Jamaica	12.87	PB
3	Anna Tóth	Hungary	13.00	NU20R
4	Jalaysiya Smith	United States	13.35	
5	Hawa Jalloh	Germany	13.36	
6	Paula Blanquer	Spain	13.40	
7	Nandini Agasara	India	13.46	
8	Valérie Guignard	Switzerland	13.66	
