= Unnathi Aiyappa =

Indian sprinter (born 2005)

Personal information
- Full name: Unnathi Aiyappa Bollanda
- Born: 5 June 2005 (age 21) Karnataka, India
- Relative: Pramila Aiyappa (mother)

Sport
- Sport: Athletics
- Event: Sprints

Achievements and titles
- Personal bests: 100 m: 11.37 (2026); 200 m: 23.40 (2026); 100 m hurdles: 13.66 (2024)
Medal record
Women's athletics
Representing India
South Asian U20 Championships
Gold medal – first place	2024 Chennai	200 m
Gold medal – first place	2024 Chennai	100 m hurdles
Asian U20 Championships
Bronze medal – third place	2024 Dubai	100 m hurdles
Gymnasiade
Bronze medal – third place	2022 Normandy	100 m hurdles

Unnathi Aiyappa Bollanda (born 5 June 2005) is an Indian sprinter from Karnataka. She qualified to represent India in 200m and 4x100m relay events, at the 2026 Asian Games at Nagoya, Aichi Prefecture, Japan from 19 September to 4 October 2026.

== Early life ==
Aiyappa is from Kodagu, Karnataka. She is the daughter of former Indian athletes, heptathlete and double Olympian, Pramila Aiyappa and 400m runner, BP Aiyappa. Her father also doubles up as her physio and coach.

== Career ==
On 13 June 2026, she won the 200m gold clocking 23.66s at Indian Athletics Series 9 at Ludhiana. On 5 June 2026, she broke the 36 year old Karnataka State record held Olympian Ashwini Nachappa in 200m at the Karnataka State Senioir Athletics meet clocking 23.40s at Bengaluru.

In 2024, she won a bronze medal in 100m at the Asian under-20 championships at Dubai and also created two new meet records in 100m and 200m hurdles at the South Asian Junior Athletics meet at Chennai.

In February 2021, Aiyappa broke two National records in the girls under 16 category at the 36th National Junior Athletics Championship at Guwahati. In the 80m hurdles, she clocked 11.50 seconds to break the record set by PT Usha in 1979. She also set a new record in the 300m hurdles timing 40.11s. In 2018, she won a gold medal in the long jump, in the under 14 category, at the Junior National Championships.

== International competitions ==
Representing India
Year	Competition	Host	Position	Event	Result
2022	Gymnasiade	Normandy, France	3rd	100 m hurdles	13.73
2022	World U20 Championships	Cali, Colombia	36th (h)	100 m hurdles	14.28
2023	Asian U20 Championships	Yecheon, South Korea	8th	200 m	24.96
2024	Asian U20 Championships	Dubai, UAE	3rd	100 m hurdles	13.66
2024	World U20 Championships	Lima, Peru	6th (h)	200 m	24.10
2024	World U20 Championships	Lima, Peru	4th (h)	100 m hurdles	13.92
2024	South Asian U20 Championships	Chennai, India	1st	100 m hurdles	13.93
2024	South Asian U20 Championships	Chennai, India	1st	200 m	23.91
