= Gymnastics at the 2023 Pan American Games – Men's horizontal bar =

Men's horizontal bar at the 2023 Pan American Games
- Venue: Training Center for Collective Sport
- Dates: October 25
- Competitors: 8 from 5 nations
- Winning score: 14.333

Medalists
| Gold medal | Arthur Mariano | Brazil |
| Silver medal | Bernardo Miranda | Brazil |
| Bronze medal | René Cournoyer | Canada |

The men's horizontal bar gymnastic event at the 2023 Pan American Games was held on October 25 at the Training Center for Collective Sport.

== Results ==
=== Final ===
| Rank | Gymnast | D Score | E Score | Pen. | Total |
|---|---|---|---|---|---|
| 1st place, gold medalist(s) | Arthur Mariano (BRA) | 5.7 | 8.633 | | 14.333 |
| 2nd place, silver medalist(s) | Bernardo Miranda (BRA) | 5.3 | 8.833 | | 14.133 |
| 3rd place, bronze medalist(s) | René Cournoyer (CAN) | 5.3 | 8.766 | | 14.066 |
| 4 | Cameron Bock (USA) | 5.2 | 8.566 | | 13.766 |
| 5 | Colt Walker (USA) | 5.2 | 8.466 | | 13.666 |
| 6 | Luca Alfieri (ARG) | 4.8 | 8.233 | | 13.033 |
| 7 | Audrys Nin Reyes (DOM) | 5.0 | 7.266 | | 12.266 |
| 8 | William Émard (CAN) | 4.4 | 7.400 | | 11.800 |

=== Qualification ===
| Rank | Gymnast | D Score | E Score | Pen. | Total | Qual. |
|---|---|---|---|---|---|---|
| 1 | (Brazil) Bernardo Miranda | 5.300 | 8.866 | | 14.166 | Q |
| 2 | (Brazil) Arthur Mariano | 5.600 | 8.500 | | 14.100 | Q |
| 3 | (Brazil) Diogo Soares | 5.500 | 8.533 | | 14.033 | – |
| 4 | (United States) Cameron Bock | 5.200 | 8.600 | | 13.800 | Q |
| 5 | (United States) Colt Walker | 5.200 | 8.466 | | 13.666 | Q |
| 6 | (Brazil) Yuri Guimarães | 5.000 | 8.600 | | 13.600 | – |
| 7 | (Dominican Republic) Audrys Nin Reyes | 5.400 | 8.166 | | 13.566 | Q |
| 8 | (Canada) René Cournoyer | 5.300 | 8.200 | | 13.500 | Q |
| 9 | (United States) Curran Phillips | 5.800 | 7.633 | | 13.433 | – |
| 10 | (United States) Donnell Whittenburg | 5.100 | 8.266 | | 13.366 | – |
| 11 | (Argentina) Luca Alfieri | 4.900 | 8.400 | | 13.300 | Q |
| 11 | (Canada) William Émard | 4.900 | 8.400 | | 13.300 | Q |
| 13 | (Mexico) Isaac Núñez | 5.100 | 8.133 | | 13.233 | R1 |
| 14 | (Colombia) Andrés Martínez | 5.400 | 7.766 | | 13.166 | R2 |
| 15 | (Cuba) Diorges Escobar | 4.900 | 8.200 | | 13.100 | R3 |
