= Gymnastics at the 2023 Pan American Games – Men's vault =

Men's vault at the 2023 Pan American Games
- Venue: Training Center for Collective Sport
- Dates: October 25
- Competitors: 8 from 7 nations
- Winning score: 14.466

Medalists
Gold medal	Audrys Nin Reyes	Dominican Republic
Silver medal	Arthur Mariano	Brazil
Bronze medal	Félix Dolci	Canada

The men's vault gymnastic event at the 2023 Pan American Games was held on October 25 at the Training Center for Collective Sport.

== Results ==
=== Final ===
Rank	Gymnast	Vault 1				Vault 2				Total
Rank	Gymnast	D Score	E Score	Pen.	Score 1	D Score	E Score	Pen.	Score 2	Total
1st place, gold medalist(s)	Audrys Nin Reyes (DOM)	5.2	9.166		14.366	5.6	9.066	0.1	14.566	14.466
2nd place, silver medalist(s)	Arthur Mariano (BRA)	5.2	9.300		14.500	5.2	9.233		14.433	14.466
3rd place, bronze medalist(s)	Félix Dolci (CAN)	5.2	9.300		14.500	5.2	9.066		14.266	14.383
4	Yuri Guimarães (BRA)	5.2	9.333		14.533	5.2	8.533		13.733	14.133
5	Daniel Villafañe (ARG)	5.2	8.666		13.866	5.2	8.666		13.866	13.866
6	Juan Larrahondo (COL)	5.6	8.700		14.300	5.2	8.433	0.3	13.333	13.816
7	Josue Armijo (CHI)	5.2	7.933		13.133	4.8	9.233		14.033	13.583
8	Alejandro de la Cruz (CUB)	5.2	8.000	0.3	12.900	5.2	7.766		12.966	12.933

=== Qualification ===
Rank	Gymnast	Vault 1				Vault 2				Total	Qual.
Rank	Gymnast	D Score	E Score	Pen.	Score 1	D Score	E Score	Pen.	Score 2	Total	Qual.
1	(Brazil) Yuri Guimarães	5.200	9.100		14.300	5.200	9.300		14.500	14.400	Q
2	(Canada) Félix Dolci	5.200	9.300	-0.1	14.400	5.200	8.833		14.033	14.216	Q
3	(Brazil) Arthur Mariano	5.200	9.433		14.633	4.800	8.933		13.733	14.183	Q
4	(Dominican Republic) Audrys Nin Reyes	5.200	8.900	-0.1	14.000	5.200	9.066		14.266	14.133	Q
5	(Argentina) Daniel Villafañe	5.200	8.866		14.066	5.200	8.733		13.933	13.999	Q
6	(Chile) Josue Armijo	4.800	9.133		13.933	4.800	9.233		14.033	13.983	Q
7	(Cuba) Alejandro de la Cruz	5.2	9.000		14.200	5.2	8.333	-0.1	13.433	13.816	Q
8	(Colombia) Juan Larrahondo	5.200	9.100		14.300	5.200	7.800	-0.3	12.700	13.500	Q
9	(Cuba) Yohendry Villaverde	5.200	8.966	-0.1	14.066	5.200	7.700		12.900	13.483	R1
10	Jorge Vega	5.200	9.100		14.300	5.200	7.633	-0.3	12.533	13.416	R2
11	(Venezuela) Edward Rolin	4.800	9.100		13.933	5.200	7.866	-0.3	12.766	13.349	R3
