= 2024 World Athletics U20 Championships – Women's 100 metres hurdles =

Women's 100 metres hurdles at the 2024 World Athletics U20 Championships
- Venue: Estadio Atlético de la VIDENA
- Dates: 29 August 2024 (heats & semi-finals); 30 August 2024 (final)
- Competitors: 60 from 40 nations
- Winning time: 12.99

Medalists
gold medal	Kerrica Hill	Jamaica
silver medal	Mia Wild	Croatia
bronze medal	Delta Amidzovski	Australia

The women's 100 metres hurdles at the 2024 World Athletics U20 Championships was held at the Estadio Atlético de la VIDENA in Lima, Peru on 29 and 30 August 2024.

== Records ==
U20 standing records prior to the 2024 World Athletics U20 Championships were as follows:

Record	Athlete & Nationality	Mark	Location	Date
World U20 Record	Britany Anderson (JAM)	12.71	Joensuu, Finland	24 July 2019
Championship Record	Kerrica Hill (JAM)	12.77	Cali, Colombia	6 August 2022
World U20 Leading	Kerrica Hill (JAM)	12.85	Schifflange, Luxembourg	21 July 2024

== Results ==
=== Heats ===
The first 2 athletes in each heat (Q) and the next 8 fastest (q) qualified to the semi-finals.

==== Heat 1 ====
Rank	Lane	Athlete	Nation	Time	Notes
1	2	Kerrica Hill	Jamaica	13.18	Q
2	6	Noor Koekelkoren	Belgium	13.54	Q
3	3	Miki Hayashi	Japan	13.80	q
4	8	Unnathi Bolland	India	13.92 (.916)	
5	4	Talia Van Rooyen	New Zealand	13.92 (.916)	PB
6	5	Maria-Nikoleta Antoniadi	Greece	14.45	
–	7	Sandy Sakyi	Germany	DQ	TR16.8
				Wind: +0.4 m/s	

==== Heat 2 ====
Rank	Lane	Athlete	Nation	Time	Notes
1	2	Siiri Siirtola	Finland	13.43	Q
2	8	Lerato Pages	Spain	13.60	Q
3	5	Rebecca Slezáková	Slovakia	13.90	
4	6	Iman Roka	Austria	13.91	
5	4	Maša Garić	Bosnia and Herzegovina	14.18	
6	3	Teodora Savic	Switzerland	14.20	
7	9	Stavriana Adamou	Cyprus	14.64	
8	7	Jana Bujan	Croatia	14.74	
				Wind: +0.1 m/s	

==== Heat 3 ====
Rank	Lane	Athlete	Nation	Time	Notes
1	7	Alina Kyshkina	Ukraine	13.37	Q, PB
2	8	Thea Brown	Great Britain	13.64	Q
3	5	Ana-Liese Torian	United States	13.95	
4	9	Lana Oberholzer	South Africa	13.99	
5	6	Klara Bjerregaard	Denmark	14.04	PB
6	3	Helen Stilling	Argentina	14.07	
7	4	Beatriz Monteiro	Brazil	14.17	
8	2	Lena Milinković	Serbia	14.71	
				Wind: -0.2 m/s	

==== Heat 4 ====
Rank	Lane	Athlete	Nation	Time	Notes
1	5	Nonah Waldron	United States	13.55	Q
2	6	Melissa Sereno	Portugal	13.70	Q
3	8	Catalina Rozas	Chile	13.84	q, PB
4	9	Melissa Benfatah	France	13.85	
5	4	Selma Ims	Norway	13.99	
6	2	Sofia Swindell	United States Virgin Islands	14.22	
7	7	Martha Neamoniti	Greece	14.25	
8	3	Isabelle Engel	Austria	14.27	
				Wind: -0.6 m/s	

==== Heat 5 ====
Rank	Lane	Athlete	Nation	Time	Notes
1	3	Luciana Zapata	Colombia	13.57	Q
2	6	Laura Montauban	France	13.66	Q
3	5	Ami Takahashi	Japan	13.72	q
4	2	Laura Osipenko	Latvia	14.16	
5	7	Jael Nöthiger	Switzerland	14.37	
6	4	Elsa Puu	Estonia	14.48	
–	8	Lilly Kunze	Germany	DQ	22.6.2
				Wind: -0.3 m/s	

==== Heat 6 ====
Rank	Lane	Athlete	Nation	Time	Notes
1	4	Jocelyn Echazabal	Cuba	13.36	Q
2	8	Zuzanna Zając	Poland	13.63	Q
3	5	Celeste Polzonetti	Italy	13.71	q
4	2	Amali Butcher	Australia	13.82	q
5	3	Iva Deliverska	Bulgaria	13.95	
6	6	Brieanna Boyce	Barbados	14.17	
7	7	Teodora Golubović	Serbia	14.61	
				Wind: 0.0 m/s	

==== Heat 7 ====
Rank	Lane	Athlete	Nation	Time	Notes
1	4	Delta Amidzovski	Australia	13.22	Q, PB
2	5	Habiba Harris	Jamaica	13.74	Q
3	6	Martina Agostini	Italy	13.84	q
4	7	Chloe Pak	Hong Kong	14.13	
5	2	Kristina Ermola	Kazakhstan	14.66	
–	3	Steffi De Saegher	Belgium	DNF	
–	8	Sunniva Indahl	Norway	DNF	
				Wind: +0.5 m/s	

==== Heat 8 ====
Rank	Lane	Athlete	Nation	Time	Notes
1	3	Mia Wild	Croatia	13.26	Q
2	8	Katjuša Nadižar	Slovenia	13.50	Q
3	5	Mia McIntosh	Great Britain	13.54	q
4	9	Maya Rollins	Barbados	13.71	q, PB
5	4	Pietra Campbell	Brazil	13.96	
6	2	Roline Louw	South Africa	14.14	
7	6	Tereza Čorejová	Slovakia	14.66	
8	7	María Alvarado	Nicaragua	14.71	NU20R
				Wind: -0.3 m/s	

=== Semi-finals ===
The first 2 athletes in each heat (Q) and the next 2 fastest (q) qualified to the final.

==== Heat 1 ====
Rank	Lane	Athlete	Nation	Time	Notes
1	6	Mia Wild	Croatia	13.24	Q
2	7	Jocelyn Echazabal	Cuba	13.31	Q
3	5	Noor Koekelkoren	Belgium	13.46	q
4	3	Habiba Harris	Jamaica	13.64	
5	4	Katjuša Nadižar	Slovenia	13.76	
6	8	Melissa Sereno	Portugal	13.80	
7	9	Amali Butcher	Australia	14.06	
8	2	Miki Hayashi	Japan	14.13	
				Wind: 0.0 m/s	

==== Heat 2 ====
Rank	Lane	Athlete	Nation	Time	Notes
1	5	Kerrica Hill	Jamaica	13.00	Q
2	6	Nonah Waldron	United States	13.35	Q
3	4	Zuzanna Zając	Poland	13.53	q
4	7	Siiri Siirtola	Finland	13.54	
5	3	Thea Brown	Great Britain	13.56	
6	8	Celeste Polzonetti	Italy	13.70	
7	2	Catalina Rozas	Chile	13.88	
8	9	Maya Rollins	Barbados	13.96	
				Wind: +0.1 m/s	

==== Heat 3 ====
Rank	Lane	Athlete	Nation	Time	Notes
1	4	Delta Amidzovski	Australia	13.48	Q
2	5	Alina Kyshkina	Ukraine	13.58	Q
3	8	Laura Montauban	France	13.72	
4	2	Ami Takahashi	Japan	13.86	
5	7	Luciana Zapata	Colombia	14.03	
6	9	Martina Agostini	Italy	14.17	
–	3	Mia McIntosh	Great Britain	DNF	
–	6	Lerato Pages	Spain	DNF	
				Wind: -1.5 m/s	

=== Final ===
Rank	Lane	Athlete	Nation	Time	Notes
1st place, gold medalist(s)	4	Kerrica Hill	Jamaica	12.99	
2nd place, silver medalist(s)	7	Mia Wild	Croatia	13.15	
3rd place, bronze medalist(s)	6	Delta Amidzovski	Australia	13.24	
4	3	Nonah Waldron	United States	13.30	
5	9	Zuzanna Zając	Poland	13.48	
6	8	Alina Kyshkina	Ukraine	13.51	
7	2	Noor Koekelkoren	Belgium	13.53	
8	5	Jocelyn Echazabal	Cuba	20.49	
				Wind: -0.3 m/s	
