= Gymnastics at the 2023 Pan American Games – Men's artistic team all-around =

Men's artistic team all-around at the 2023 Pan American Games
- Venue: Training Center for Collective Sport
- Dates: October 21
- Winning score: 249.860

Medalists
Gold medal	Cameron Bock; Stephen Nedoroscik; Curran Phillips; Colt Walker; Donnell Whittenburg	United States
Silver medal	Zachary Clay; René Cournoyer; Félix Dolci; William Émard; Jayson Rampersad	Canada
Bronze medal	Yuri Guimarães; Arthur Mariano; Bernardo Miranda; Patrick Sampaio; Diogo Soares	Brazil

The men's artistic team final at the 2023 Pan American Games was held on October 21 at the Training Center for Collective Sport in Santiago, Chile. This event also served as the qualification for the all-around and event finals.

== Schedule ==
All times are Chile Time (UTC-3).

Date	Time	Round
October 21		Subdivision 1
October 21		Subdivision 2

== Results ==
=== Team ===
Rank	Team	Floor (gymnastics)	Pommel horse	Rings (gymnastics)	Vault (gymnastics)	Parallel bars	Horizontal bar	Total
1st place, gold medalist(s)	United States	41.232 (2)	39.799 (2)	41.666 (1)	43.599 (1)	42.665 (1)	40.899 (2)	249.860
1st place, gold medalist(s)	Cameron Bock	13.466	13.766	13.600	14.533	13.433	13.800	249.860
1st place, gold medalist(s)	Stephen Nedoroscik		13.633					249.860
1st place, gold medalist(s)	Curran Phillips				14.566	14.466	13.433	249.860
1st place, gold medalist(s)	Colt Walker	13.533	12.000	13.633	14.500	14.366	13.666	249.860
1st place, gold medalist(s)	Donnell Whittenburg	14.233	12.400	14.433	14.066	13.833	13.366	249.860
2nd place, silver medalist(s)	Canada	41.032 (3)	40.632 (1)	41.266 (2)	43.199 (2)	41.099 (5)	39.566 (3)	246.794
2nd place, silver medalist(s)	Zachary Clay		13.966	13.033		13.833	12.600	246.794
2nd place, silver medalist(s)	René Cournoyer	13.733		13.800	14.166	13.033	13.500	246.794
2nd place, silver medalist(s)	Félix Dolci	14.266	12.000	13.800	14.400	13.400	12.766	246.794
2nd place, silver medalist(s)	William Émard	12.966	12.400	13.666	14.633	13.866	13.300	246.794
2nd place, silver medalist(s)	Jayson Rampersad	13.033	14.266					246.794
3rd place, bronze medalist(s)	Brazil	41.766 (1)	37.632 (5)	38.499 (6)	43.199 (2)	41.999 (2)	42.299 (1)	245.394
3rd place, bronze medalist(s)	Yuri Guimarães	14.100	11.966	12.800	14.300	13.766	13.600	245.394
3rd place, bronze medalist(s)	Arthur Mariano	14.066	12.266	12.533	14.633	13.633	14.100	245.394
3rd place, bronze medalist(s)	Bernardo Miranda		12.466			14.133	14.166	245.394
3rd place, bronze medalist(s)	Patrick Sampaio	12.966		12.666	13.600			245.394
3rd place, bronze medalist(s)	Diogo Soares	13.600	12.900	13.033	14.266	14.100	14.033	245.394
4	Argentina	39.966 (5)	39.432 (3)	39.566 (3)	41.699 (5)	39.366 (6)	38.966 (4)	238.995
4	Santiago Agostinelli	13.133		13.000	13.833	12.733	12.400	238.995
4	Luca Alfieri		13.400			12.133	13.300	238.995
4	Julian Jato	12.833	12.166	12.366	12.866	13.233	12.966	238.995
4	Santiago Mayol	14.000	13.866	12.266	13.800	13.400	12.700	238.995
4	Daniel Villafañe	12.433		14.200	14.066			238.995
5	Mexico	40.033 (4)	37.299 (6)	39.033 (4)	41.199 (8)	38.766 (7)	37.932 (7)	234.262
5	Fabián de Luna	11.066		13.433	13.433	12.000	11.833	234.262
5	Rodrigo Gómez	13.900	13.133	12.800	13.800	12.733	12.433	234.262
5	Josué Juárez			12.166	13.400	11.400	12.266	234.262
5	Isaac Núñez	12.600	11.933	12.800	13.966	14.033	13.233	234.262
5	Alonso Pérez	13.533	12.233					234.262
6	Cuba	36.299 (8)	35.233 (8)	36.932 (8)	42.166 (4)	41.232 (3)	38.366 (5)	230.228
6	Alejandro de la Cruz	13.366	5.166	13.600	14.200	13.333	12.200	230.228
6	José Carlos Escandón	10.300		11.466		13.733	11.766	230.228
6	Diorges Escobar	10.600	11.133	11.866	13.900	14.166	13.100	230.228
6	Pablo Pozo	12.333	11.900	9.666	13.833	11.533	13.066	230.228
6	Yohendry Villaverde		12.200		14.066			230.228
7	Colombia	37.633 (7)	33.732 (9)	38.965 (5)	41.433 (7)	39.632 (5)	38.266 (6)	229.661
7	Kristopher Bohórquez	11.700		13.666		12.866	11.400	229.661
7	Dilan Jiménez	11.400	10.133	12.766	13.433	13.633	12.300	229.661
7	Juan Larrahondo	13.800		11.900	14.300			229.661
7	Andrés Martínez	12.133	11.633	12.533	13.700	12.166	13.166	229.661
7	Sergio Vargas		11.966			13.133	12.800	229.661
8	Chile	38.199 (6)	35.432 (7)	38.132 (7)	41.599 (6)	38.233 (8)	36.999 (8)	228.594
8	Joaquin Álvarez			12.800		12.900		228.594
8	Joel Álvarez	13.466	12.466	13.166	13.700	12.033	12.900	228.594
8	Josue Armijo	11.133	12.200		13.933	12.500	11.966	228.594
8	Prado Cristóbal	10.000	10.566	11.633	12.400		10.433	228.594
8	Luciano Letelier	13.600	10.766	12.166	13.966	12.833	12.133	228.594
9	Puerto Rico	24.366 (9)	38.232 (4)	23.866 (9)	26.366 (9)	26.499 (9)	24.800 (9)	164.129
9	Nelson Alberto Guilbe Morales		13.866					164.129
9	José López	11.933	11.800	12.600	12.933	12.866	11.700	164.129
9	Andres Josue Perez Ginez	12.433	12.566	11.266	13.433	13.633	13.100	164.129

== Individual qualification ==
=== All-around ===
Rank	Gymnast	Floor (gymnastics)	Pommel horse	Rings (gymnastics)	Vault (gymnastics)	Parallel bars	Horizontal bar	Total	Results
1	(United States) Cameron Bock	13.466	13.766	13.600	14.533	13.433	13.800	82.598	Q
2	(United States) Donnell Whittenburg	14.233	12.400	14.433	14.066	13.833	13.366	82.331	Q
3	(Brazil) Diogo Soares	13.600	12.900	13.033	14.266	14.100	14.033	81.932	Q
4	(United States) Colt Walker	13.533	12.000	13.633	14.500	14.366	13.666	81.698	–
5	(Brazil) Arthur Mariano	14.066	12.266	12.533	14.633	13.633	14.100	81.231	Q
6	(Canada) William Émard	12.966	12.400	13.666	14.633	13.866	13.300	80.831	Q
7	(Canada) Félix Dolci	14.266	12.000	13.800	14.400	13.400	12.766	80.632	Q
8	(Brazil) Yuri Guimarães	14.100	11.966	12.800	14.300	13.766	13.600	80.532	–
9	(Argentina) Santiago Mayol	14.000	13.866	12.266	13.800	13.400	12.700	80.032	Q
10	(Dominican Republic) Audrys Nin Reyes	13.266	11.900	12.633	14.000	13.600	13.566	78.965	Q
11	(Mexico) Rodrigo Gómez	13.900	13.133	12.800	13.800	12.733	12.433	78.799	Q
12	(Mexico) Isaac Núñez	12.600	11.933	12.800	13.966	14.033	13.233	78.565	Q
13	(Peru) Edward Gonzáles	13.000	13.233	12.266	13.800	13.300	12.533	78.132	Q
14	(Chile) Joel Álvarez	13.466	12.466	13.166	13.700	12.033	12.900	77.731	Q
15	(Puerto Rico) Andres Josue Perez Ginez	12.433	12.566	11.266	13.433	13.633	13.100	76.431	Q
16	(Argentina) Julian Jato	12.833	12.166	12.366	12.866	13.233	12.966	76.430	Q
17	(Venezuela) Adickxon Gabriel Trejo Basalo	12.433	11.933	12.333	13.533	12.800	12.533	75.565	Q
18	(Chile) Luciano Letelier	13.600	10.766	12.166	13.966	12.833	12.133	75.464	Q
19	(Colombia) Andrés Martínez	12.133	11.633	12.533	13.700	12.166	13.166	75.331	Q
20	(Cuba) Diorges Escobar	10.600	11.133	11.866	13.900	14.166	13.100	74.765	Q
21	(Peru) Daniel Alarcón	12.100	11.133	12.566	13.766	12.300	12.433	74.298	Q
22	(Ecuador) Johnny Adrian Valencia	12.566	12.333	12.466	12.466	12.666	11.600	74.097	Q
22	(Puerto Rico) José López	11.933	11.800	12.600	12.933	12.866	11.700	73.832	Q
23	(Colombia) Dilan Jiménez	11.400	10.133	12.766	13.433	13.633	12.300	73.665	Q
24	(United States) Vahe Petrosyan	9.833	13.433	12.566	13.833	10.900	12.866	73.431	–
25	(Ecuador) César López	12.500	11.233	13.100	12.200	11.266	12.800	73.099	Q
26	(Jamaica) Caleb Faulk	12.600	10.933	12.766	12.566	12.166	11.466	72.497	Q
27	(Cuba) Pablo Pozo	12.333	11.900	9.666	13.833	11.533	13.066	72.331	R1
28	(Cuba) Alejandro de la Cruz	13.366	5.166	13.600	14.200	13.333	12.200	71.865	–
29	(Panama) Richard Atencio	11.766	11.133	11.566	12.933	12.933	11.266	71.597	R2
30	(Bolivia) Oliver Sons Sánchez	11.000	9.200	12.600	13.766	11.300	10.833	68.699	R3

=== Floor exercise ===
Rank	Gymnast	D Score	E Score	Pen.	Total	Qual.
1	(Canada) Félix Dolci	6.000	8.266		14.266	Q
2	(United States) Donnell Whittenburg	6.400	7.833		14.233	Q
3	(Brazil) Yuri Guimarães	5.700	8.500	-0.10	14.100	Q
4	(Brazil) Arthur Mariano	5.300	8.766		14.066	Q
5	(Argentina) Santiago Mayol	5.700	8.300		14.000	Q
6	(Mexico) Rodrigo Gómez	5.400	8.500		13.900	Q
7	(Colombia) Juan Larrahondo	5.500	8.300		13.800	Q
8	(Canada) René Cournoyer	5.300	8.433		13.733	Q
9	(Brazil) Diogo Soares	5.400	8.500	-0.3	13.600	–
10	(Chile) Luciano Letelier	5.700	7.900		13.600	R1
11	(United States) Colt Walker	5.200	8.433	-0.1	13.533	R2
12	(Mexico) Alonso Pérez	5.400	8.233	-0.10	13.533	R3

=== Pommel horse ===
Rank	Gymnast	D Score	E Score	Pen.	Total	Qual.
1	(Canada) Jayson Rampersad	6.100	8.166		14.266	Q
2	(Canada) Zachary Clay	5.700	8.266		13.966	Q
3	(Argentina) Santiago Mayol	5.500	8.366		13.866	Q
4	(Puerto Rico) Nelson Guilbe	5.600	8.266		13.866	Q
5	(United States) Cameron Bock	5.400	8.366		13.766	Q
6	(United States) Stephen Nedoroscik	6.200	7.433		13.633	Q
7	(United States) Vahe Petrosyan	5.300	8.133		13.433	–
8	(Argentina) Luca Alfieri	4.700	8.700		13.400	Q
9	(Peru) Edward Gonzáles	5.400	8.433		7.833	Q
10	(Mexico) Rodrigo Gómez	5.200	7.933		13.133	R1
11	(Brazil) Diogo Soares	5.800	7.100		12.900	R2
12	(Puerto Rico) Andres Josue Perez Ginez	4.700	7.866		12.566	R3

=== Rings ===
Rank	Gymnast	D Score	E Score	Pen.	Total	Qual.
1	(United States) Donnell Whittenburg	6.000	8.433		14.433	Q
2	(Argentina) Daniel Villafañe	6.000	8.200		14.200	Q
3	(Canada) Félix Dolci	5.400	8.400		13.800	Q
3	(Canada) René Cournoyer	5.400	8.400		13.800	Q
5	(Canada) William Émard	5.500	8.166		13.666	–
6	(Colombia) Kristopher Bohórquez	5.600	8.066		13.666	Q
7	(United States) Colt Walker	5.400	8.233		13.633	Q
8	(United States) Cameron Bock	5.200	8.400		13.600	–
9	(Cuba) Alejandro de la Cruz	5.500	8.100		13.600	Q
10	(Mexico) Fabián de Luna	5.600	7.833		13.433	Q
11	(Chile) Joel Álvarez	4.900	8.266		13.166	R1
12	(Ecuador) César López	4.700	8.400		13.100	R2
13	(Brazil) Diogo Soares	4.400	8.633		13.033	R3

=== Vault ===
Rank	Gymnast	Vault 1				Vault 2				Total	Qual.
Rank	Gymnast	D Score	E Score	Pen.	Score 1	D Score	E Score	Pen.	Score 2	Total	Qual.
1	(Brazil) Yuri Guimarães	5.200	9.100		14.300	5.200	9.300		14.500	14.400	Q
2	(Canada) Félix Dolci	5.200	9.300	-0.1	14.400	5.200	8.833		14.033	14.216	Q
3	(Brazil) Arthur Mariano	5.200	9.433		14.633	4.800	8.933		13.733	14.183	Q
4	(Dominican Republic) Audrys Nin Reyes	5.200	8.900	-0.1	14.000	5.200	9.066		14.266	14.133	Q
5	(Argentina) Daniel Villafañe	5.200	8.866		14.066	5.200	8.733		13.933	13.999	Q
6	(Chile) Josue Armijo	4.800	9.133		13.933	4.800	9.233		14.033	13.983	Q
7	(Cuba) Alejandro de la Cruz	5.2	9.000		14.200	5.2	8.333	-0.1	13.433	13.816	Q
8	(Colombia) Juan Larrahondo	5.200	9.100		14.300	5.200	7.800	-0.3	12.700	13.500	Q
9	(Cuba) Yohendry Villaverde	5.200	8.966	-0.1	14.066	5.200	7.700		12.900	13.483	R1
10	Jorge Vega	5.200	9.100		14.300	5.200	7.633	-0.3	12.533	13.416	R2
11	(Venezuela) Edward Rolin	4.800	9.100		13.933	5.200	7.866	-0.3	12.766	13.349	R3

=== Parallel bars ===
Rank	Gymnast	D Score	E Score	Pen.	Total	Qual.
1	(United States) Curran Phillips	6.800	7.666		14.466	Q
2	(United States) Colt Walker	6.000	8.366		14.366	Q
3	(Cuba) Diorges Escobar	5.900	8.266		14.166	Q
4	(Brazil) Bernardo Miranda	5.600	8.533		14.133	Q
5	(Brazil) Diogo Soares	5.600	8.500		14.100	Q
6	(Mexico) Isaac Núñez	5.900	8.133		14.033	Q
7	(Canada) William Émard	5.500	8.366		13.866	Q
8	(Canada) Zachary Clay	5.200	8.633		13.833	Q
9	(United States) Donnell Whittenburg	5.800	8.033		13.833	–
10	(Brazil) Yuri Guimarães	5.200	8.566		13.766	–
11	(Cuba) José Carlos Escandón	5.700	8.033		13.733	R1
12	(Brazil) Arthur Mariano	5.100	8.533		13.633	–
13	(Puerto Rico) Andres Josue Perez Ginez	5.500	8.133		13.633	R2
14	(Colombia) Dilan Jiménez	5.900	7.733		13.633	R3

=== Horizontal bar ===
Rank	Gymnast	D Score	E Score	Pen.	Total	Qual.
1	(Brazil) Bernardo Miranda	5.300	8.866		14.166	Q
2	(Brazil) Arthur Mariano	5.600	8.500		14.100	Q
3	(Brazil) Diogo Soares	5.500	8.533		14.033	–
4	(United States) Cameron Bock	5.200	8.600		13.800	Q
5	(United States) Colt Walker	5.200	8.466		13.666	Q
6	(Brazil) Yuri Guimarães	5.000	8.600		13.600	–
7	(Dominican Republic) Audrys Nin Reyes	5.400	8.166		13.566	Q
8	(Canada) René Cournoyer	5.300	8.200		13.500	Q
9	(United States) Curran Phillips	5.800	7.633		13.433	–
10	(United States) Donnell Whittenburg	5.100	8.266		13.366	–
11	(Argentina) Luca Alfieri	4.900	8.400		13.300	Q
11	(Canada) William Émard	4.900	8.400		13.300	Q
13	(Mexico) Isaac Núñez	5.100	8.133		13.233	R1
14	(Colombia) Andrés Martínez	5.400	7.766		13.166	R2
15	(Cuba) Diorges Escobar	4.900	8.200		13.100	R3
