= 2024 World Athletics U20 Championships – Women's long jump =

Women's long jump at the 2024 World Athletics U20 Championships
- Venue: Estadio Atlético de la VIDENA
- Dates: 27 August 2024 (qualification); 28 August 2024 (final)
- Competitors: 25 from 23 nations
- Winning distance: 6.58 m

Medalists
gold medal	Delta Amidzovski	Australia
silver medal	Sophia Beckmon	United States
bronze medal	Julia Adamczyk	Poland

The women's long jump at the 2024 World Athletics U20 Championships was held at the Estadio Atlético de la VIDENA on 27 and 28 August.

== Records ==
U20 standing records prior to the 2024 World Athletics U20 Championships were as follows:

Record	Athlete & Nationality	Mark	Location	Date
World U20 Record	Heike Drechsler (GDR)	7.14	Bratislava, Czechoslovakia	4 June 1983
Championship Record	Fiona May (GBR)	6.82	Sudbury, Canada	30 July 1988
World U20 Leading	Sophia Beckmon (USA)	6.86	Champaign, United States	4 May 2024

== Results ==
=== Qualification ===
Athletes attaining a mark of at least 6.40 metres (Q) or at least the 12 best performers (q) qualified for the final.

==== Group A ====
Rank	Athlete	Nation	Round			Mark	Notes
Rank	Athlete	Nation	1	2	3	Mark	Notes
1	Laura Martínez	Spain	6.12	6.37		6.37	q, SB
2	Prestina Ochonogor	Nigeria	5.95	6.28	5.97	6.28	q
3	Sophia Beckmon	United States	6.11	6.16	x	6.16	q
4	Vanessa Lokuli	France	5.95	6.14	6.12	6.14	q
5	Ayla Hallberg Hossain	Sweden	x	5.89	6.11	6.11	q
6	Delta Amidzovski	Australia	x	5.97	6.09	6.09	q
7	Julia Adamczyk	Poland	x	x	6.05	6.05	q
8	Janae De Gannes	Trinidad and Tobago	6.03	5.76	5.88	6.03	q
9	Elizabeth Ndudi	Ireland	5.91	5.95	5.86	5.95	q
10	Dunja Sedlaček	Serbia	5.61	5.95	x	5.95	
11	Bori Rózsahegyi	Hungary	x	5.76	5.85	5.85	
12	Pavana Nagaraja	India	x	5.74	x	5.74	
13	Timeke-Jade Coetzee	South Africa	5.25	5.29	5.49	5.49	

==== Group B ====
Rank	Athlete	Nation	Round			Mark	Notes
Rank	Athlete	Nation	1	2	3	Mark	Notes
1	Diana Myroshnichenko	Ukraine	5.28	x	6.09	6.09	q
2	Tatiana Pereira	Portugal	5.55	5.82	6.01	6.01	q
3	Vanessa Sena	Brazil	5.97	x	x	5.97	q
4	Rohanna Sudlow	Jamaica	5.94	x	5.82	5.94	
5	Shion Hashimoto	Japan	5.89	x	x	5.89	
6	Ana Ćurković	Croatia	5.79	5.56	5.64	5.79	
7	Alexandria Johnson	United States	5.70	5.65	5.75	5.75	
8	Inese Bembere	Latvia	4.92	5.57	5.64	5.64	
9	Joana Fiodorovaité	Lithuania	5.60	5.38	4.92	5.60	
10	Dianelys Alacán	Cuba	x	x	5.60	5.60	
11	Atang Naane	South Africa	x	x	5.22	5.22	
12	Madushani Herath	Sri Lanka	5.18	x	x	5.18	

=== Final ===
Rank	Athlete	Nation	Round						Mark	Notes
Rank	Athlete	Nation	1	2	3	4	5	6	Mark	Notes
1st place, gold medalist(s)	Delta Amidzovski	Australia	6.18	6.49	x	x	6.58	x	6.58	PB
2nd place, silver medalist(s)	Sophia Beckmon	United States	6.48	6.39	6.44	6.15	6.54	6.25	6.54	
3rd place, bronze medalist(s)	Julia Adamczyk	Poland	6.11	6.20	6.01	6.16	6.34	4.46	6.34	
4	Diana Myroshnichenko	Ukraine	5.98	6.22	x	x	5.99	x	6.22	
5	Prestina Ochonogor	Nigeria	5.85	6.03	6.06	5.99	6.21	5.87	6.21	
6	Elizabeth Ndudi	Ireland	x	6.06	x	x	6.18	6.01	6.18	
7	Vanessa Lokuli	France	5.83	6.04	5.76	5.86	5.97	6.12	6.12	
8	Janae De Gannes	Trinidad and Tobago	6.09	6.03	5.84	5.92	5.99	x	6.09	
9	Laura Martínez	Spain	x	6.04	x				6.04	
10	Ayla Hallberg Hossain	Sweden	6.01	x	5.86				6.01	
11	Vanessa Sena	Brazil	5.88	5.90	5.99				5.99	
12	Tatiana Pereira	Portugal	5.74	x	x				5.74	
