= Luisa Maia =

Brazilian artistic gymnast

- Full name: Luisa Gomes Maia
- Born: 10 October 2006 (age 19) São João del-Rei

Gymnastics career
- Discipline: Women's artistic gymnastics
- Country represented: Brazil (2022–2023)
- Club: Flamengo (CRF)
- Head coach: Walmy Junior
Medal record
Artistic gymnastics
Representing Brazil
South American Games
Gold medal – first place	2022 Asunción	Team
South American Championships
Gold medal – first place	2022 Lima	Team
Gold medal – first place	2022 Lima	All-around
Gold medal – first place	2023 Cali	Team

Luisa Gomes Maia (born 10 October 2006) is a Brazilian artistic gymnast. She was part of the team that won bronze at the 2023 DTB Pokal Mixed Cup.

== Career ==
=== 2022 ===
At the Gymnasiade, Luisa Maia, alongside Júlia Soares, Rafaela Oliva, Camille Fonseca and Marcela Meirelles reached the fourth position at the team final. Maia finished eighth and sixth in the all-around and uneven bars finals, respectively.

In August, during the Brazilian Championships, Maia debuted in her new club, Flamengo, helping her new teammates Rebeca Andrade, Flávia Saraiva, Lorrane Oliveira, Hellen Carvalho and Larissa Oliveira dominate the field by more than 22 points. Later that month, Luisa Maia got team and all-around gold at the South American Championships and sixth in the beam final.

On her last competition of the year, Luisa Maia got team gold with the contributions of Júlia Soares, Carolyne Pedro, Christal Bezerra, Thaís Fidélis and Beatriz Lima at the 2022 South American Games. She also finished fourth in the all-around and seventh in the balance beam final.

=== 2023 ===
Luisa Maia began her year of competitions at the DTB Pokal Team Challenge and Mixed Cup. After a competitive field in the Team Challenge, the Brazilian team composed of Júlia Soares, Carolyne Pedro, Gabriela Barbosa and Josiany Calixto finished ninth. One day later, Maia, Pedro and Calixto, alongside Tomás Florêncio, Yuri Guimarães and Josué Heliodoro got the unprecedented bronze medal for Brazil, surpassing the United States team by 0.166 points. In May, during the Pan American Championships, Maia helped the Brazilian team qualify for the 2023 Pan American Games and finish the competition fifth place, with her contributions on vault and floor.

== Competitive history ==
Year	Event	Team	AA	VT	UB	BB	FX
2022
2022	Gymnasiade	4	8		6		
2022	Brazilian Championships	1st place, gold medalist(s)	10		17	8	15
2022	South American Championships	1st place, gold medalist(s)	1st place, gold medalist(s)			6	
2022	South American Games	1st place, gold medalist(s)	4			7	
2023	DTB Pokal Team Challenge	9					
2023	DTB Pokal Mixed Cup	3rd place, bronze medalist(s)					
2023	Brazil Trophy				R2	R3	4
2023	Pan American Championships	5					9
2023	Brazilian Championships	1st place, gold medalist(s)	14		21	21	18
2023	South American Championships	1st place, gold medalist(s)					
