= 2023 Pan American Artistic Gymnastics Championships =

Gymnastics event in Medellín, Colombia

Pan American Gymnastics Championships
- Venue: Jorge Hugo Giraldo Gymnastics Coliseum
- Location: Medellín, Colombia
- Date: May 26–29, 2023

The 2023 Pan American Gymnastics Championships was an artistic gymnastics competition that took place in Medellín, Colombia from May 26–29.

The event served as qualification for the upcoming Pan American Games in Santiago, Chile and the upcoming World Championships in Antwerp, Belgium.

== Medalists ==
Event	Gold	Silver	Bronze
Men
Team all-around	United States; Taylor Christopulos; Yul Moldauer; Curran Phillips; Donnell Whittenburg; Shane Wiskus; Khoi Young	Canada; Félix Blacquiere; Zachary Clay; Félix Dolci; William Émard; Léandre Sauvé; Samuel Zakutney	Brazil; Bernardo Actos; Lucas Bittencourt; Tomás Florêncio; Yuri Guimarães; Patrick Sampaio; Leonardo Souza
Individual all-around	Yul Moldauer (USA)	Shane Wiskus (USA)	Yuri Guimarães (BRA)
Floor exercise	Yul Moldauer (USA)	Yuri Guimarães (BRA)	Shane Wiskus (USA)
Pommel horse	Khoi Young (USA)	Nelson Guilbe (PUR)	Yul Moldauer (USA)
Rings	Daniel Villafañe (ARG)	William Émard (CAN)	Alejandro de la Cruz (CUB)
Vault	Yuri Guimarães (BRA)	Ignacio Varas (CHI)	Leandro Peña (DOM)
Parallel bars	Yul Moldauer (USA)	Shane Wiskus (USA)	Dilan Jiménez (COL)
Horizontal bar	Curran Phillips (USA)	Yul Moldauer (USA)	Luciano Letelier (CHI)
Women
Team all-around	United States; Addison Fatta; Madray Johnson; Nola Matthews; Zoe Miller; Joscelyn Roberson; Tiana Sumanasekera	Mexico; Greys Briceño; Paulina Campos; Natalia Escalera; Cassandra Loustalot; Alexa Moreno; Ahtziri Sandoval	Canada; Jenna Lalonde; Cassie Lee; Frédérique Sgarbossa; Aurélie Tran; Sydney Turner; Evandra Zlobec
Individual all-around	Tiana Sumanasekera (USA)	Natalia Escalera (MEX)	Aurélie Tran (CAN)
Vault	Alexa Moreno (MEX)	Joscelyn Roberson (USA)	Natalia Escalera (MEX)
Uneven bars	Nola Matthews (USA)	Addison Fatta (USA)	Natalia Escalera (MEX)
Balance beam	Tiana Sumanasekera (USA)	Joscelyn Roberson (USA)	Aurélie Tran (CAN)
Floor exercise	Joscelyn Roberson (USA)	Tiana Sumanasekera (USA)	Natalia Escalera (MEX)

== Medal table ==
=== Overall ===
* Host nation (Colombia)

Rank	Nation	Gold	Silver	Bronze	Total
1	United States	11	7	2	20
2	Mexico	1	2	3	6
3	Brazil	1	1	2	4
4	Argentina	1	0	0	1
5	Canada	0	2	3	5
6	Chile	0	1	1	2
7	Puerto Rico	0	1	0	1
8	Colombia*	0	0	1	1
8	Cuba	0	0	1	1
8	Dominican Republic	0	0	1	1
Totals (10 entries)		14	14	14	42

==== Men ====
* Host nation (Colombia)

Rank	Nation	Gold	Silver	Bronze	Total
1	United States	6	3	2	11
2	Brazil	1	1	2	4
3	Argentina	1	0	0	1
4	Canada	0	2	0	2
5	Chile	0	1	1	2
6	Puerto Rico	0	1	0	1
7	Colombia*	0	0	1	1
7	Cuba	0	0	1	1
7	Dominican Republic	0	0	1	1
Totals (9 entries)		8	8	8	24

==== Women ====
Rank	Nation	Gold	Silver	Bronze	Total
1	United States	5	4	0	9
2	Mexico	1	2	3	6
3	Canada	0	0	3	3
Totals (3 entries)		6	6	6	18

== Men's results ==
=== Team ===
Rank	Team	Floor (gymnastics)	Pommel horse	Rings (gymnastics)	Vault (gymnastics)	Parallel bars	Horizontal bar	Total
1st place, gold medalist(s)	United States	41.633	41.967	41.500	42.466	41.366	38.567	247.499
1st place, gold medalist(s)	Yul Moldauer	14.100	14.133	14.133		14.200		247.499
1st place, gold medalist(s)	Shane Wiskus	14.000		13.967		13.233	13.167	247.499
1st place, gold medalist(s)	Taylor Christopulos		13.367	13.400	14.333		11.000	247.499
1st place, gold medalist(s)	Khoi Young	13.533	14.467		14.233			247.499
1st place, gold medalist(s)	Curran Phillips				13.900	13.933	14.400	247.499
2nd place, silver medalist(s)	Canada	40.767	36.566	40.500	42.233	39.900	38.633	238.599
2nd place, silver medalist(s)	William Émard	13.967	12.533	13.800	14.133	13.867	13.267	238.599
2nd place, silver medalist(s)	Félix Blacquiere	13.200	12.033	13.233	13.767	13.000	11.433	238.599
2nd place, silver medalist(s)	Léandre Sauvé	13.600			14.333			238.599
2nd place, silver medalist(s)	Félix Dolci			13.467			13.933	238.599
2nd place, silver medalist(s)	Zachary Clay		12.000			13.033		238.599
3rd place, bronze medalist(s)	Brazil	39.700	36.734	39.534	40.933	39.833	38.167	234.901
3rd place, bronze medalist(s)	Tomás Florêncio	12.900	12.100	13.167	13.633	12.633	12.700	234.901
3rd place, bronze medalist(s)	Bernardo Actos		12.067		14.200	14.000	12.700	234.901
3rd place, bronze medalist(s)	Patrick Sampaio	13.333		13.200			12.767	234.901
3rd place, bronze medalist(s)	Leonardo Souza		12.567	13.167		13.200		234.901
3rd place, bronze medalist(s)	Yuri Guimarães	13.467			13.100			234.901
4	Colombia	38.400	34.700	39.900	41.867	40.300	38.933	234.100
4	Andrés Martínez	12.900	13.000	13.000	13.867	12.867	13.300	234.100
4	Sergio Vargas	12.400	10.967		13.633	13.300	12.900	234.100
4	Dilan Jiménez	13.100		13.233	14.367	14.133		234.100
4	José Martínez		10.733				12.733	234.100
4	Kristopher Bohórquez			13.667				234.100
5	Argentina	38.167	36.900	39.300	39.600	38.766	38.600	231.333
5	Santiago Mayol	12.700	13.267		13.867	12.933	12.500	231.333
5	Julian Jato	13.000	12.033	12.533		13.433	12.933	231.333
5	Santiago Agostinelli	12.467		12.900	12.033			231.333
5	Luca Alfieri		11.600			12.400	13.167	231.333
5	Daniel Villafañe			13.867	13.700			231.333
6	Mexico	39.200	37.334	36.967	39.634	39.267	36.533	228.935
6	Maximiliano Galicia	12.800	12.167	12.767	13.567	13.167	12.833	228.935
6	Isaac Núñez	13.200	13.200			13.267	12.900	228.935
6	Alonso Pérez	13.200	11.967	10.833	11.900			228.935
6	Fabián de Luna			13.367	14.167			228.935
6	Josue Juárez					12.833	10.800	228.935
7	Cuba	36.633	36.833	36.667	40.766	38.267	39.200	228.366
7	Pablo Harold Pozo	12.633	12.500	12.233		13.567	12.233	228.366
7	Diorges Escobar	12.100	11.900		13.633	11.133	14.167	228.366
7	José Escandón	12.467		12.900	12.033			228.366
7	Yohendry Villaverde	11.900	12.433		12.933			228.366
7	Alejandro de la Cruz			13.067				228.366
8	Puerto Rico	34.966	30.033	36.500	38.500	34.567	32.367	206.933
8	Miguel Aquino III	11.900		11.600	12.800	11.767	12.067	206.933
8	Andrés Pérez Ginés	11.833	12.633		12.967		9.300	206.933
8	Francisco Vélez			11.900	12.733	10.500	11.000	206.933
8	José López	11.233	4.867	13.000		12.300		206.933
8	Nelson Guilbe		12.533					206.933

The individual all-around and event rankings were determined via the qualification round, with no designated all-around or event finals. The top eight athletes in each event are displayed below, with two gymnasts per nation eligible for ranking.

=== All-around ===
Rank	Gymnast	Floor (gymnastics)	Pommel horse	Rings (gymnastics)	Vault (gymnastics)	Parallel bars	Horizontal bar	Total
1st place, gold medalist(s)	(United States) Yul Moldauer	14.500	13.367	13.733	14.433	14.567	13.600	84.200
2nd place, silver medalist(s)	(United States) Shane Wiskus	14.200	12.800	13.667	14.500	14.100	13.533	82.800
3rd place, bronze medalist(s)	(Brazil) Yuri Guimarães	14.433	12.933	13.033	14.367	13.600	13.200	81.566
4	(Colombia) Andrés Martínez	13.300	12.833	13.033	13.867	13.000	12.967	79.000
5	(Mexico) Isaac Núñez	12.300	12.100	13.467	13.900	13.100	12.500	78.301
6	(Chile) Joel Álvarez	13.067	11.933	12.933	13.933	13.067	13.267	78.200
7	(Canada) William Émard	14.000	11.200	13.933	14.300	13.767	10.667	77.867
8	(Puerto Rico) Andrés Pérez Ginés	13.367	12.467	12.233	13.033	13.367	13.100	77.567

=== Floor exercise ===
Rank	Gymnast	D Score	E Score	Pen.	Total
1st place, gold medalist(s)	(United States) Yul Moldauer	5.7	8.800		14.500
2nd place, silver medalist(s)	(Brazil) Yuri Guimarães	5.9	8.533		14.433
3rd place, bronze medalist(s)	(United States) Shane Wiskus	5.6	8.600		14.200
4	(Canada) William Émard	5.6	8.400		14.000
5	(Guatemala) Jorge Vega	5.9	8.067		13.967
6	(Brazil) Patrick Sampaio	5.7	8.100		13.800
7	(Cuba) Diorges Escobar	5.8	8.167	-0.3	13.767
8	(Mexico) Rodrigo Gómez	5.5	8.233		13.733

=== Pommel horse ===
Rank	Gymnast	D Score	E Score	Pen.	Total
1st place, gold medalist(s)	(United States) Khoi Young	6.2	8.100		14.300
2nd place, silver medalist(s)	(Puerto Rico) Nelson Guilbe	5.5	8.000		13.500
3rd place, bronze medalist(s)	(United States) Yul Moldauer	6.1	7.267		13.367
4	(Jamaica) Elel Wahrmann-Baker	5.3	7.767		13.067
5	(Brazil) Yuri Guimarães	5.2	7.733		12.933
6	(Colombia) Andrés Martínez	4.9	7.933		12.833
7	(Argentina) Luca Alfieri	4.7	8.067		12.767
8	(Mexico) Rodrigo Gómez	4.8	7.833		12.633

=== Rings ===
Rank	Gymnast	D Score	E Score	Pen.	Total
1st place, gold medalist(s)	(Argentina) Daniel Villafañe	6.0	8.133		14.133
2nd place, silver medalist(s)	(Canada) William Émard	5.5	8.433		13.933
3rd place, bronze medalist(s)	(Cuba) Alejandro de la Cruz	5.6	8.233		13.833
4	(United States) Yul Moldauer	5.8	7.933		13.733
5	(Canada) Félix Dolci	5.4	8.267		13.667
6	(United States) Shane Wiskus	5.5	8.167		13.667
7	(Colombia) Kristopher Bohórquez	5.6	7.967		13.567
8	(Mexico) Fabián de Luna	5.7	7.800		13.500

=== Vault ===
Rank	Gymnast	Vault 1				Vault 2				Total
Rank	Gymnast	D Score	E Score	Pen.	Score 1	D Score	E Score	Pen.	Score 2	Total
1st place, gold medalist(s)	(Brazil) Yuri Guimarães	5.2	9.167		14.367	5.2	9.033		14.233	14.300
2nd place, silver medalist(s)	(Chile) Ignacio Varas	5.2	8.900		14.100	5.2	9.267		14.467	14.284
3rd place, bronze medalist(s)	(Dominican Republic) Leandro Peña	4.8	9.033		13.833	5.2	8.933	-0.1	14.033	13.933
4	(Guatemala) Jorge Vega	5.2	9.367	-0.3	14.267	5.2	8.333		13.533	13.900
5	(Cuba) Alejandro de la Cruz	5.2	8.700	-0.3	13.600	5.2	9.033	-0.1	14.133	13.866
6	(Mexico) Fabián de Luna	5.2	8.967		14.167	5.2	8.233	-0.3	13.133	13.650
7	(Canada) Léandre Sauvé	5.2	8.167		13.367	5.2	8.833	-0.1	13.933	13.650
8	(Chile) Josué Armijo	4.8	8.833	-0.3	13.333	4.8	9.200	-0.1	13.900	13.617

=== Parallel bars ===
Rank	Gymnast	D Score	E Score	Pen.	Total
1st place, gold medalist(s)	(United States) Yul Moldauer	6.4	8.167		14.567
2nd place, silver medalist(s)	(United States) Shane Wiskus	6.0	8.100		14.100
3rd place, bronze medalist(s)	(Colombia) Dilan Jiménez	5.4	8.467		13.867
4	(Canada) William Émard	5.5	8.267		13.767
5	(Canada) Félix Dolci	5.9	7.833		13.733
6	(Mexico) Josue Juárez	5.6	8.100		13.700
7	(Mexico) Isaac Núñez	5.6	8.067		13.667
8	(Brazil) Yuri Guimarães	5.2	8.400		13.600

=== Horizontal bar ===
Rank	Gymnast	D Score	E Score	Pen.	Total
1st place, gold medalist(s)	(United States) Curran Phillips	5.4	8.433		13.833
2nd place, silver medalist(s)	(United States) Yul Moldauer	5.1	8.500		13.600
3rd place, bronze medalist(s)	(Chile) Luciano Letelier	5.7	7.800		13.500
4	(Cuba) Diorges Escobar	5.1	8.300		13.400
5	(Cuba) José Escandón	5.1	8.267		13.367
5	(Mexico) Isaac Núñez	5.1	8.267		13.367
7	(Chile) Jose Álvarez	5.1	8.167		13.267
8	(Brazil) Bernardo Actos	5.0	8.233		13.233

== Women's results ==
=== Team ===
Rank	Team	Vault (gymnastics)	Uneven bars	Balance beam	Floor (gymnastics)	Total
1st place, gold medalist(s)	United States	41.533	41.067	40.233	40.867	163.700
1st place, gold medalist(s)	Tiana Sumanasekera	14.233		13.967	13.700	163.700
1st place, gold medalist(s)	Joscelyn Roberson	13.800		13.733	14.067	163.700
1st place, gold medalist(s)	Addison Fatta	13.500	13.700			163.700
1st place, gold medalist(s)	Nola Matthews		14.067		13.100	163.700
1st place, gold medalist(s)	Madray Johnson		13.300	12.533		163.700
2nd place, silver medalist(s)	Mexico	41.300	38.399	36.100	38.899	154.698
2nd place, silver medalist(s)	Natalia Escalera	13.467	12.433	12.133	13.233	154.698
2nd place, silver medalist(s)	Alexa Moreno	14.100		11.667	12.833	154.698
2nd place, silver medalist(s)	Ahtziri Sandoval	13.733	13.033			154.698
2nd place, silver medalist(s)	Cassandra Loustalot			12.300	12.833	154.698
2nd place, silver medalist(s)	Paulina Campos		12.933			154.698
3rd place, bronze medalist(s)	Canada	38.666	38.367	35.866	38.099	150.998
3rd place, bronze medalist(s)	Aurélie Tran	13.400	12.967	11.533	13.133	150.998
3rd place, bronze medalist(s)	Sydney Turner	12.833	12.367	13.033	12.633	150.998
3rd place, bronze medalist(s)	Evandra Zlobec	12.433			12.333	150.998
3rd place, bronze medalist(s)	Jenna Lalonde		13.033	11.300		150.998
3rd place, bronze medalist(s)	Cassie Lee					150.998
4	Argentina	38.634	35.867	35.200	36.766	146.467
4	Milagros Curti	12.767		12.133	12.233	146.467
4	Meline Mesropian		11.367	10.900	12.400	146.467
4	Nicole Iribarne	12.900			12.133	146.467
4	Rocio Saucedo		12.800	12.167		146.467
4	Sira Macias	12.967	11.700			146.467
5	Brazil	38.000	35.667	36.000	36.467	146.234
5	Carolyne Pedro	12.767	11.500	12.233	12.367	146.234
5	Julia Soares		12.000	12.300	13.033	146.234
5	Andreza Lima	12.433	12.167	11.467		146.234
5	Christal Bezerra	12.800				146.234
5	Luisa Maia				11.167	146.234
6	Colombia	37.601	33.267	34.200	36.000	141.068
6	Ginna Escobar	12.767	10.300	11.167	12.000	141.068
6	Yiseth Valenzuela	12.667		11.400	12.567	141.068
6	Angelica Mesa	12.167	11.400		11.433	141.068
6	Daira Lamadrid		11.567	11.633		141.068
6	Maria Villegas					141.068
7	Panama	36.667	35.334	33.101	35.833	140.935
7	Karla Navas	13.200	12.567	10.767	12.067	140.935
7	Hillary Heron	12.267	11.800	11.867	12.333	140.935
7	Lucia Paulino	11.200		10.467	11.433	140.935
7	Valentina Brostella		10.967			140.935
8	Puerto Rico	33.634	35.434	32.333	34.600	136.001
8	Natalia Delgado	11.300		11.167	11.633	136.001
8	Stella Diaz	11.067	12.067	10.933		136.001
8	Katyna Alicea	11.267	10.400		11.300	136.001
8	Ainhoa Herrera			10.233	11.667	136.001
8	Sydney Barros		12.967			136.001

The individual all-around and event rankings were determined via the qualification round, with no designated all-around or event finals. The top eight athletes in each event are displayed below, with two gymnasts per nation eligible for ranking.

=== All-around ===
Rank	Gymnast	Vault (gymnastics)	Uneven bars	Balance beam	Floor (gymnastics)	Total
1st place, gold medalist(s)	(United States) Tiana Sumanasekera	13.933	12.633	13.767	13.567	53.900
2nd place, silver medalist(s)	(Mexico) Natalia Escalera	13.433	13.600	13.033	13.200	53.266
3rd place, bronze medalist(s)	(Canada) Aurélie Tran	13.100	13.567	13.167	13.033	52.867
4	(United States) Nola Matthews	12.900	14.000	12.700	12.667	52.267
5	(Mexico) Alexa Moreno	14.167	12.300	12.233	12.900	51.600
6	(Brazil) Carolyne Pedro	12.600	13.033	12.467	12.467	50.567
7	(Brazil) Julia Soares	12.533	12.633	12.433	12.900	50.499
8	(Puerto Rico) Sydney Barros	12.900	12.900	11.967	12.467	50.234

=== Vault ===
Rank	Gymnast	Vault 1				Vault 2				Total
Rank	Gymnast	D Score	E Score	Pen.	Score 1	D Score	E Score	Pen.	Score 2	Total
1st place, gold medalist(s)	(Mexico) Alexa Moreno	5.4	8.767		14.167	4.4	8.833		13.233	13.700
2nd place, silver medalist(s)	(United States) Joscelyn Roberson	5.2	8.533		13.733	5.0	8.433		13.433	13.583
3rd place, bronze medalist(s)	(Mexico) Natalia Escalera	4.6	8.833		13.433	4.4	8.800		13.200	13.316
4	(United States) Addison Fatta	5.0	8.500		13.500	4.4	8.300		12.700	13.100
5	(Chile) Franchesca Santi	5.0	8.233	-0.1	13.133	4.4	8.333		12.733	12.933
6	(Chile) Makarena Pinto	4.6	8.267		12.867	4.4	8.067		12.467	12.667
7	(Colombia) Yiseth Valenzuela	4.2	8.667		12.867	3.8	8.300		12.100	12.483
8	(Colombia) Angelica Mesa	4.2	8.200		12.400	3.4	8.000		11.400	11.900

=== Uneven bars ===
Rank	Gymnast	D Score	E Score	Pen.	Total
1st place, gold medalist(s)	(United States) Nola Matthews	5.5	8.500		14.000
2nd place, silver medalist(s)	(United States) Addison Fatta	5.4	8.267		13.667
3rd place, bronze medalist(s)	(Mexico) Natalia Escalera	5.9	7.700		13.600
4	(Canada) Aurélie Tran	5.3	8.267		13.567
5	(Mexico) Paulina Campos	5.5	8.000		13.500
6	(Canada) Sydney Turner	5.0	8.167		13.167
7	(Argentina) Meline Mesropian	4.8	8.333		13.133
8	(Argentina) Sira Macias	5.0	8.033		13.033

=== Balance beam ===
Rank	Gymnast	D Score	E Score	Pen.	Total
1st place, gold medalist(s)	(United States) Tiana Sumanasekera	5.8	7.967		13.767
2nd place, silver medalist(s)	(United States) Joscelyn Roberson	5.8	7.467		13.267
3rd place, bronze medalist(s)	(Canada) Aurélie Tran	5.3	7.867		13.167
4	(Mexico) Cassandra Loustalot	5.1	8.033		13.133
5	(Canada) Cassie Lee	5.6	7.533		13.133
6	(Mexico) Natalia Escalera	5.2	7.833		13.033
7	(Brazil) Carolyne Pedro	5.0	7.467		12.467
8	(Brazil) Julia Soares	5.2	7.333	-0.1	12.433

=== Floor exercise ===
Rank	Gymnast	D Score	E Score	Pen.	Total
1st place, gold medalist(s)	(United States) Joscelyn Roberson	6.1	8.000		14.100
2nd place, silver medalist(s)	(United States) Tiana Sumanasekera	5.3	8.267		13.567
3rd place, bronze medalist(s)	(Mexico) Natalia Escalera	5.2	8.100		13.300
4	(Canada) Aurélie Tran	4.7	8.333		13.033
5	(Mexico) Cassandra Loustalot	4.9	8.100		13.000
6	(Argentina) Meline Mesropian	5.0	8.000		13.000
7	(Canada) Evandra Zlobec	4.7	8.267		12.967
8	(Brazil) Julia Soares	5.3	7.800	-0.2	12.900

== World Championships qualification ==
The top men's team and women's team qualified a full team to the 2023 World Championships in Antwerp, Belgium. In women's artistic gymnastics, United States, Brazil, Canada, Mexico, and Argentina qualified a full team. Additionally, Sydney Barros (Puerto Rico), Olivia Kelly (Barbados), Karla Navas (Panama), Ginna Escobar (Colombia), Alais Perea (Ecuador), Lynnzee Brown (Haiti), Makarena Pinto Adasme (Chile), Yiseth Valenzuela (Colombia), Franchesca Santi (Chile), Lana Herrera (Panama), and Ana Karina Méndez (Peru) earned individual berths. In men's artistic gymnastics, United States, Brazil, Colombia, and Canada qualified a full team. In addition, Isaac Núñez (Mexico), Joel Álvarez (Chile), Andres Josue Perez Gines (Puerto Rico), Santiago Mayol (Argentina), Rodrigo Gómez, and Diorges Escobar (Cuba) earned individual berths.
