= Kerrica Hill =

Jamaican athlete (born 2005)

Personal information
- Nationality: Jamaican
- Born: 6 March 2005 (age 21)

Sport
- Country: Jamaica
- Sport: Track and Field
- Event: 100 metres hurdles
- Club: Elite Performance; MVP Track & Field
- Coached by: Reynaldo Walcott; Brigitte Foster-Hylton; Corey Bennett

Achievements and titles
- Personal bests: 60 mH: 8.12 (2026); 100 m: 11.16 (2022); 100 mH: 12.50 (2026)
Medal record
Women's athletics
Representing Jamaica
World U20 Championships
Gold medal – first place	2024 Lima	100 m hurdles
Gold medal – first place	2021 Nairobi	4×100 m relay
Gold medal – first place	2022 Cali	100 m hurdles
Gold medal – first place	2022 Cali	4×100 m relay
NACAC U18 Championships
Gold medal – first place	2021 San José	4×100 m relay
Silver medal – second place	2021 San José	100 m hurdles

Kerrica Hill (born 6 March 2005) is a Jamaican track and field athlete. She won gold medals in the 100 metres hurdles and the 4 x 100 m relay at the 2022 World Under-20 Championships. Prior to this, she had won relay gold at the 2021 World U20 Championships.

== Biography ==
Kerrica Hill attended Hydel High School in Jamaica. She was competing for that institution when she broke the world under-18 best (76.2 cm barriers) for the 100 m hurdles, recording 12.71 seconds at the ISSA/Grace Kennedy Boys and Girls Champs in Kingston in April 2022.

== 2022 ==
As a 17-year-old she won two gold medals at the 2022 World Athletics U20 Championships in Cali, Colombia. She triumphed in the 100 m hurdles (senior height barriers) with a time of 12.77 seconds, setting new championship record and her second world U18 best in the process. In addition, she was part of women's 4 x 100 m relay team which broke the world U20 record with 42.59 s to win gold. Hill set in her individual event three of the five fastest U20 times of the season. Speculation followed soon after the championships that she could be about to turn professional.

== 2023 ==
In 2023, Hill went professional out of high school and made her debut at the Tom Jones Invitational in Florida clocking 12.86 for the 100mh.

== 2024 ==
She retained her world U20 title at the 2024 World Athletics U20 Championships in Lima, Peru, winning in 12.99 seconds into a -3 m/s headwind, ahead of Mia Wild of Croatia and Australian Delta Amidzovski.

== 2025 ==
She qualified from her 100 metres hurdles semi-final at the 2025 Jamaican Athletics Championships in 12.77 seconds, before placing fourth in the final in 12.69 seconds (+0.1 m/s). She lowered her personal best to 12.54 seconds competing in Switzerland in July 2025. She was subsequently named in the Jamaican squad for the 2025 NACAC Championships in Nassau, The Bahamas. Having joined the Elite Performance Track Club in 2022, she left to move to the MVP Track Club in September 2025.

== 2026 ==
In March 2026, she ran a personal best 22.80 seconds for the 200 metres at Velocity Fest in Kingston. On 4 April, Hill won the 100 metres hurdles at the Miramar Invitational in 12.81 (+1.0 m/s). On 21 June, Hill placed third overall behind Demisha Roswell and Megan Simmonds in 12.67 seconds for the 100 metres hurdles in the final of the 2026 Jamaican Athletics Championships. She was a finalist in the 100 metres hurdles at the 2026 Commonwealth Games in Glasgow, Scotland.

== Personal bests ==
- 60 metres – 7.10 (+2.0 m/s, Kingston 2023)
- 100 metres – 11.16 (+1.2 m/s, Kingston 2022)
- 200 metres – 22.80 (+0.5 m/s, Kingston 2026)
- 100 m hurdles – 12.50 (-0.4 m/s, Budapest 2026)
  - 100 m hurdles (76.2 cm) – 12.71 (+0.8 m/s, Kingston 2022) WU18B
