= Sophia Beckmon =

American athlete

Personal information
- Nationality: American
- Born: 17 August 2005 (age 20)

Sport
- Sport: Athletics
- Event: Long jump
- Coached by: Petros Kyprianou

Achievements and titles
- Personal bests: Long jump: 6.86m (2024) NU20R
Medal record
Women's athletics
Representing United States
World U20 Championships
Silver medal – second place	2024 Lima	Long jump
NACAC U23 Championships
Gold medal – first place	2023 San Jose	Long jump
Gold medal – first place	2023 San Jose	4 × 100 m

Sophia Beckmon (born 17 August 2005) is an American long jumper.

== Early life ==
From Oregon City, she attended Oregon City High School and won consecutive national U18 titles in the long jump.

== Career ==
She finished runner-up in the long jump at the 2022 USATF U20 Outdoor Championships in Eugene, Oregon and qualified for the World U20 Championships in 2022 but was unable to travel to Cali, Colombia due to a passport issue.

She won gold in both the long jump and the 4 × 100 m relay at the 2023 NACAC U23 Championships in San Jose, Costa Rica in July 2023.

After starting at University of Illinois, in May 2024 and coached by world renowned coach Petros Kyprianou, she jumped 6.86 m (+1.0 m/s) in Champaign to equal the North, Central American and Caribbean under-20 record distance. She won silver in the long jump at the 2024 World Athletics U20 Championships in Lima, Peru on 28 August 2024.

In March 2025, Beckmon placed fifth in the long jump at the NCAA Indoor Championships in Virginia Beach, with a jump of 6.67 metres. In June, she finished sixth in the long jump at the NCAA Outdoor Championships in Eugene.

Beckmon started her 2026 indoor season at the Illini Open with a jump of 6.81 metres in January 2026. She then jumped 6.82 metres at the Tyson Invitational in Fayetteville, Arkansas on 13 February 2026. Having also improved her year best to 6.85 metres, she won the Big Ten Indoor Championships long jump title that month, also competing in the 60 metres at the championships. She won the 2026 NCAA Division I Indoor Track and Field Championships in the long jump on 13 March, with a best jump of 6.84 metres. That summer, she qualified for the 2026 NCAA Outdoor Championships. On 16 July, she won at Spitzen Leichtathletik Luzern with a jump of 6.85 metres.
