= 2022 South American Artistic Gymnastics Championships =

The 2022 South American Artistic Gymnastics Championships was held in Lima, Peru, from August 17 to 21, 2022. The competition was approved by the International Gymnastics Federation.

== Medalists ==
Event	Gold	Silver	Bronze
Men
Team all-around	Brazil; Yuri Guimarães; Patrick Sampaio; Murilo Pontedura; Leonardo Souza; Bernardo Actos; Diogo Paes	Argentina; Santiago Mayol; Daniel Villafañe; Luca Alfieri; Julian Jato; Ivo Chiapponni; Santiago Agostinelli	Peru; Edward González; Arian León; Daniel Agüero; Luis Pizarro; Edward Alarcón; Mauricio Gallegos
Individual all-around	Santiago Mayol (ARG)	Yuri Guimarães (BRA)	Jossimar Calvo (COL)
Floor exercise	Yuri Guimarães (BRA)	Bernardo Actos (BRA)	Ignacio Varas (CHI)
Pommel horse	Santiago Mayol (ARG)	Leonardo Souza (BRA)	Lucas Alfieri (ARG)
Rings	Daniel Villafañe (ARG)	Patrick Sampaio (BRA)	Joel Alvarez (CHI)
Vault	Yuri Guimarães (BRA)	Ignacio Varas (CHI)	Daniel Agüero (PER)
Parallel bars	Jossimar Calvo (COL)	Javier Sandoval (COL)	Julian Jato (ARG)
Horizontal bar	Jossimar Calvo (COL)	Javier Sandoval (COL)	Joel Alvarez (CHI)
Women
Team all-around	Brazil; Luisa Maia; Beatriz Lima; Thais Fidelis; Luiza Trautwein; Rafaela Oliva; Camille Fonseca	Argentina; Abigail Magistrati; Sira Macias; Felicitas Palmou; Milagros Curti; Leila Martínez; Lucila Estarli	Peru; Ana Mendez; Ana Rengifo; Chris Centeno; Fabiana Cuneo; Annia Teran; Maria Zuñiga
Individual all-around	Luisa Maia (BRA)	Beatriz Lima (BRA)	Ana Mendez (PER)
Vault	Lucila Estarli (ARG)	Beatriz Lima (BRA)	Diana Vásquez (BOL)
Uneven bars	Thais Fidelis (BRA)	Sira Macias (ARG)	Ana Mendez (PER)
Balance beam	Abigail Magistrati (ARG)	Ana Mendez (PER)	Antonia Marihuan (CHI)
Floor exercise	Milagros Curti (ARG)	Abigail Magistrati (ARG)	Rafaela Oliva (BRA)

== Participating nations ==
- Argentina
- Aruba
- Bolivia
- Brazil
- Chile
- Colombia
- Ecuador
- Peru
- Uruguay

== Medal table ==
Rank	Nation	Gold	Silver	Bronze	Total
1	Brazil (BRA)	6	6	1	13
2	Argentina (ARG)	6	4	2	12
3	Colombia (COL)	2	2	1	5
4	Peru (PER)	0	1	5	6
5	Chile (CHI)	0	1	4	5
6	Bolivia (BOL)	0	0	1	1
Totals (6 entries)		14	14	14	42

== See also ==
- Gymnastics at the 2022 South American Games
