= Patrick Sampaio =

Brazilian artistic gymnast

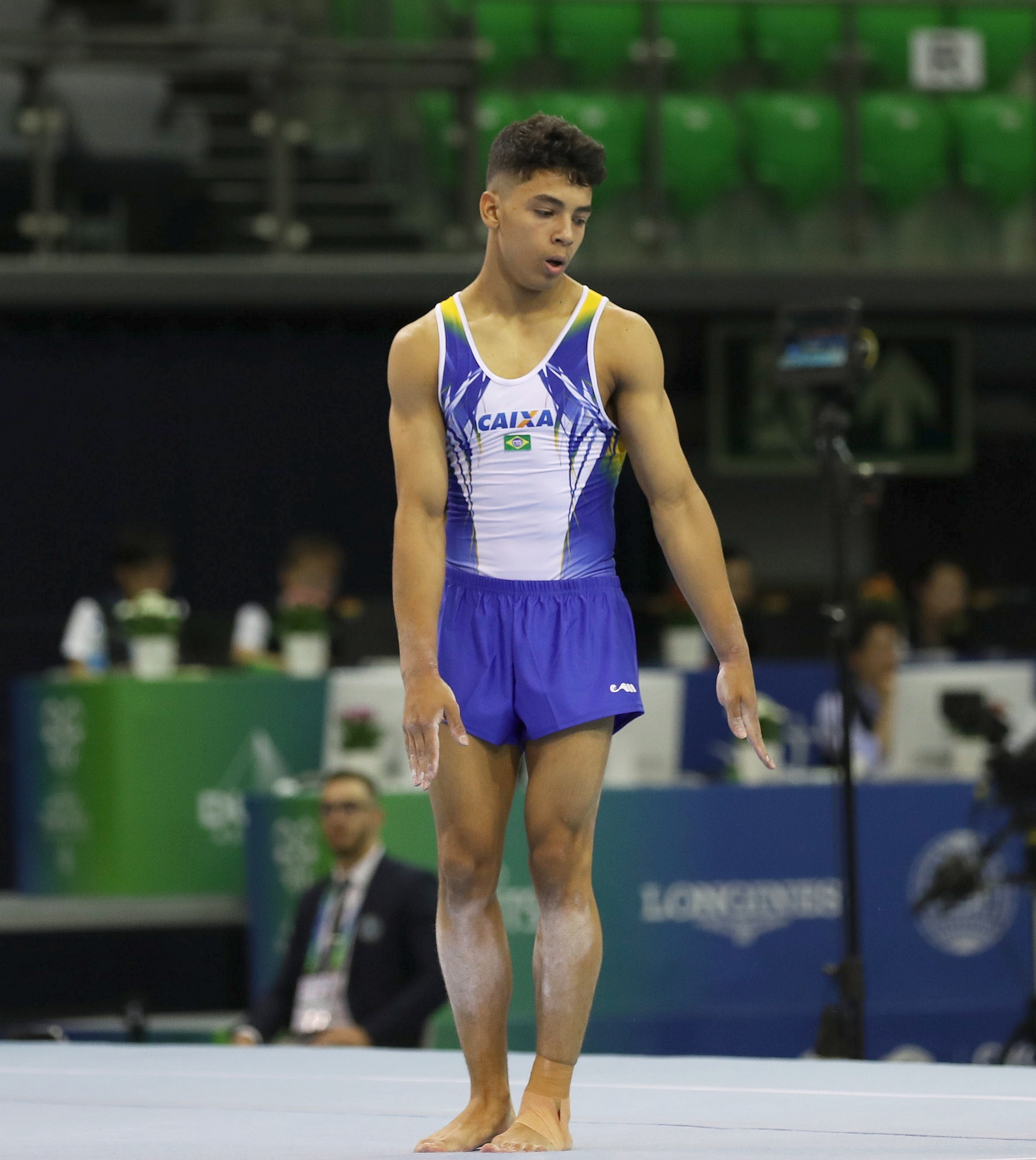

Personal information
- Full name: Patrick Sampaio Correa
- Born: 7 September 2002 (age 24) Resende, Brazil

Gymnastics career
- Discipline: Men's artistic gymnastics
- Country represented: Brazil; (2018–present)
- Club: Esporte Clube Pinheiros
- Head coach: Cristiano Albino
Medal record
Representing Brazil
Men's artistic gymnastics
Pan American Games
Bronze medal – third place	2023 Santiago	Team
Pan American Championships
Gold medal – first place	2024 Santa Marta	Team
Silver medal – second place	2022 Rio de Janeiro	Team
Bronze medal – third place	2023 Medellín	Team
South American Games
Gold medal – first place	2026 Santa Fe	Team
Bronze medal – third place	2026 Santa Fe	All-around
South American Championships
Gold medal – first place	2021 San Juan	Team
Gold medal – first place	2021 San Juan	Horizontal bar
Gold medal – first place	2022 Lima	Team
Gold medal – first place	2024 Aracaju	Team
Silver medal – second place	2022 Lima	Rings

Patrick Sampaio Correa (born 7 September 2002) is a Brazilian artistic gymnast and a member of the national team. He participated in the 2023 World Artistic Gymnastics Championships.

== Gymnastics career ==
=== Junior ===
Sampaio competed at the 2018 Junior Pan American Artistic Gymnastics Championships, earning the silver medal with the Brazilian team. In 2019, he competed at the Junior World Artistic Gymnastics Championships, placing 20th in the all-around competition.

=== Senior ===
In 2021, Sampaio participated in the South American Artistic Gymnastics Championships, earning a gold medal with the Brazilian team and an individual gold medal on the horizontal bar. In 2022, he participated in the South American Artistic Gymnastics Championships for a second time, once again earning a gold with the Brazilian team and a silver on the still rings.

In 2023, he earned a bronze medal with the Brazilian team at the Pan American Artistic Gymnastics Championships. Later that year, he participated in the 2023 World Artistic Gymnastics Championships, helping the Brazilian team finish 13th, earning the nation an individual non-nominative quota for the 2024 Summer Olympics.
