= 2024 South Asian U20 Athletics Championships =

Athletics competition in Chennai, India

4th South Asian U20 Athletics Championships
- Venue: Jawaharlal Nehru Stadium
- Location: Chennai, India
- Start date: 11 September 2024
- End date: 13 September 2024
- Competitors: 176 from 7 nations

The 2024 South Asian U20 Athletics Championships was an athletics competition held from 11 to 13 September 2024 at Jawaharlal Nehru Stadium, Chennai. 176 athletes competed in 30 events. India, the host, was the most successful nation, winning 21 gold medals.

Afghanistan did not attend the event despite being a member of the South Asian Athletics Federation.

== Medal table ==
* Host nation (India)

Rank	Nation	Gold	Silver	Bronze	Total
1	India (IND)*	21	22	5	48
2	Sri Lanka (SRI)	9	9	17	35
3	Bangladesh (BAN)	0	0	3	3
4	Maldives (MDV)	0	0	2	2
5	Nepal (NEP)	0	0	1	1
6	Bhutan (BHU)	0	0	0	0
6	Pakistan (PAK)	0	0	0	0
Totals (7 entries)		30	31	28	89

== Results ==
There were 3 days of competition.

=== Men ===
Event	Gold		Silver		Bronze	
100 m	Merone Wijesinghe; Sri Lanka	10.41	Dineth Induwara Weeraratna; Sri Lanka	10.49	Mrutyam Jayaram Dondapati; India	10.56
200 m	Indusara Vidushan Rajamuni; Sri Lanka	21.33	Pratik Maharana; India	21.41	Malith Thamel; Sri Lanka	21.44
400 m	Jay Kumar; India	46.86	J.O. Shashintha Silva; Sri Lanka	47.17	Abiram Pramod; India	47.49
800 m	H.D.S Awishka; Sri Lanka	1:49.83	Vinod Kumar; India	1:50.07	Bopanna Kalappa; India	1:50.45
1500 m	. Priyanshu; India	3:53.22	Rahul Sarnaliya; India	3:53.64	Buddika Rashmikara; Sri Lanka	4:03.79
3000 m	Sharuk Khan; India	8:26.06	Mohit Choudhary; India	8:27.61	B.K. Ajaya; Nepal	9:08.91
110 m hurdles (99.0 cm)	Sandun Kosala Wijayalath; Sri Lanka	14.06	Nayan Pradip Sarde; India	14.14	E. Wishwa Tharuka; Sri Lanka	14.27
High Jump	Lesandu Arthavidu Gammanage; Sri Lanka	2.17	Tharusha Dinushan Agampodi; Sri Lanka	2.10	Juwel Thomas; India	2.04
Long Jump	R.C. Jithin Arjunan; India	7.61 0.0	Mohd. Atta Sazid; India	7.43 -0.4	D Thevindu Sandil; Sri Lanka	7.22 +1.5
Triple Jump	D.M.H.K. Dissanayake; Sri Lanka	15.09 +0.2	Senura Hansaka; Sri Lanka	14.92 +0.5	MD. Tamin Hossain; Bangladesh	14.75 -0.3
Shot Put (6 kg)	Siddharth Choudhary; India	19.19	Anurag Singh Kaler; India	18.91	W. Jayavi Ranhinda Alwis; Sri Lanka	15.62
Discus Throw (1.750 kg)	Ritik; India	55.64	. Raman; India	51.22	W.Cristiyan Diluk; Sri Lanka	39.24
Javelin throw	Rohan Yadav; India	69.22	Dipanshu Sharma; India	68.85	U.G.B.D. Danasinghe; Sri Lanka	62.22
4 × 100 m relay	Sri Lanka; Malith Thamel; Dineth Induwara Weeraratna; Indusara Vidushan Rajamuni; Merone Wijesinghe	40.28	India; Pratik Maharana; Karthikeyan Soundararajan; Mahendra Santa; Mrutyam Jayaram Dondapati	40.76	Maldives; Hussain Zeek Suad; Ibrahim Naahil Nizar; Zu Iz Mohamed Suad; Mohamed Minhaal Shamin	41.98
4 × 400 m relay	Sri Lanka; U.H. Hasindu Nethsara; J.O. Shashintha Silva; G.W. Jathya Kirulu; S.M.S.V. Rajakaruna	3:09.27	India; Abiram Pramod; Ankul; Vinod Kumar; Jay Kumar	3:11.14	Bangladesh; B. Sheikh; M. Al Sobur; Md. Hafizur Hafizur; Md. Aslam Sikder	3:21.50

=== Women ===
Event	Gold		Silver		Bronze	
100 m	Abinaya Rajarajan; India	11.77	Sudheeksha Vadluri; India	11.92	Shanella Senevirathne; Sri Lanka	12.04
200 m	Unnathi Aiyappa Bolland; India	23.91	Nancy; India	24.11	Neeru Pahtak; India	24.91
400 m	Neeru Pahtak; India	54.50	Sandramol Sabu; India	54.82	K. Takshima Nuhansa; Sri Lanka	55.27
800 m	M.G.T.A. Pemasiri; Sri Lanka	2:10.17	Laxmipriya Kisan; India	2:10.87	U.M.S. Himashani; Sri Lanka	2:12.13
1500 m	Vinita Gurjar; India	4:33.63	Laxita Vinod Sandilea; India	4:37.61	T.G.H. Dulanjana Pradeepani; Sri Lanka	4:39.01
3000 m	Prachi Ankush; India	9:57.26	Shilpa Dihora; India	10:04.23	T.G.H. Dulanjana Pradeepani; Sri Lanka	10:39.39
100 m hurdles	Unnathi Aiyappa Bolland; India	13.93	Sabita Toppo; India	13.96	P.G.M.S. Gunathilaka; Sri Lanka	15.32
High Jump	Pooja Singh; India	1.80	D.K.T. Jayarathne; Sri Lanka	1.65	V.P. Nethra Samadhi; Sri Lanka	1.65
Long Jump	Prathiksha Yamuna; India	5.79 (+0.1)	N. Lakshanya; India	5.75 (+0.2)	H.R. Dhananjana Sithmini; Sri Lanka	5.73 (+0.1)
Triple Jump	Rishika Awasthi; India	12.76 (−0.2)	M. Dilki Nehara; Sri Lanka	12.32 (+0.1)	Anisha Tharu; Nepal	NM
Shot Put (4 kg)	Tamanna; India	14.43	Pooja Kumari; India	14.02	Malkethmi Silva; Sri Lanka	10.68
Discus Throw (1 kg)	Anisha; India	49.91	Amanat Kamboj; India	48.38	J.H. Gauranganie Savindhaya; India	37.95
Javelin throw	Deepika; India	54.98	Poonam; India	51.21	W.G. Nisansala Madubash; Sri Lanka	35.02
4 × 100 m relay	India; Nancy; Neole Anna Cornelio; Abinaya Rajarajan; Sudheeksha Vadluri	45.08	Sri Lanka; H.R.D.S. Ranasgalla; D. Reshma Kodithuwakku; Dilanma Perera; Shenella Seneviratne	46.48	Maldives; Hawwa Muzna Faiz; Ahnaa Nizaar; Ziva Moosa; Mariyam Ru Ya Ali	48.04
4 × 400 m relay	India; Shravani Sachin Sangle; Sandramol Sabu; Kanista Teena Maria Deva Shekar; Neeru Pahtak	3:44.35	Sri Lanka; Jithma Wijethunga; Mahima Dunusinghe; G. Shashini Bhagya; K. Takshima Nuhansa	3:49.99	Bangladesh; Musrat Javam; Mst. Mim Akter; Mst Azmi Khatun; Akter Sumaiya	3:57.37
