= Bernardo Actos =

Brazilian artistic gymnast

- Full name: Bernardo Actos Andrade de Souza Miranda
- Born: 28 May 1999 (age 27) Sete Lagoas, Brazil

Gymnastics career
- Discipline: Men's artistic gymnastics
- Country represented: Brazil; (2016–present)
- Club: Minas Tênis Clube
- Head coach: Antônio Lameira
Medal record
Men's artistic gymnastics
Representing Brazil
Pan American Games
Silver medal – second place	2023 Santiago	Horizontal bar
Bronze medal – third place	2023 Santiago	Team
Pan American Championships
Bronze medal – third place	2023 Medellín	Team
South American Games
Gold medal – first place	2026 Santa Fe	Team
Silver medal – second place	2026 Santa Fe	Floor exercise
South American Championships
Gold medal – first place	2022 Lima	Team
Gold medal – first place	2024 Aracaju	Team
Gold medal – first place	2024 Aracaju	All-around
Gold medal – first place	2024 Aracaju	Floor exercise
Silver medal – second place	2022 Lima	Floor exercise
FIG World Cup
Event	1st	2nd	3rd
World Challenge Cup	0	0	1
Total	0	0	1

Bernardo Actos Miranda (Note: This name uses Portuguese naming customs: the first or maternal family name is Actos and the second or paternal family name is Miranda.) (born 28 May 1999) is a Brazilian artistic gymnast and a member of the national team. He participated in the 2023 World Artistic Gymnastics Championships.

== Gymnastics career ==
=== Junior ===
Actos competed at the 2016 Pan American Individual Event Artistic Gymnastics Championships in the junior division in 2016. He earned seven medals, including gold in the all-around competition.

=== Senior ===
Actos suffered a dislocated shoulder injury during a selection camp in 2021, which forced him to miss the 2021 Pan American Gymnastics Championships and a chance to qualify to represent Brazil at the 2020 Summer Olympics. In 2022, he participated in the South American Artistic Gymnastics Championships, earning gold with the Brazilian team and silver on the floor exercise.

In 2023, Actos earned a bronze medal with the Brazilian team at the Pan American Artistic Gymnastics Championships. In September, he earned the bronze medal on the horizontal bar at the 2023 Paris World Challenge Cup. Later that month, he participated in the 2023 World Artistic Gymnastics Championships, helping the Brazilian team finish 13th, earning the nation an individual non-nominative quota for the 2024 Summer Olympics.
