= Elizabeth Ndudi =

Irish athlete

Personal information
- Nationality: Ireland
- Born: 21 March 2005 (age 21) Dublin
- Height: 180 cm (5 ft 11 in)

Sport
- Sport: Track and Field
- Event: Long Jump
- College team: Illinois Fighting Illini
- Coached by: Petros Kyprianou

Achievements and titles
- Personal best: Long jump : 6.68 NR (2024)
Medal record
Women's athletics
Representing Ireland
European U20 Championships
Gold medal – first place	2023 Jerusalem	Long jump

Elizabeth Ndudi (born 21 March 2005) is an Irish track and field athlete. She won the long jump at the 2023 European Athletics U20 Championships, making her Ireland's first field event medalist at such a championship.

== Career ==
Ndudi holds the longest Irish jump, followed by Kelly Proper. At the 2024 Gary Wieneke Memorial, in April, she set a national record with a jump of 6.68m. Ndudi won the long jump at the 2023 European Athletics U20 Championships, with a result of 6.56m. She has previously won the Irish National Championships held in Morton Stadium, Dublin in July 2023 and the Irish National Indoor Championships held in the National Indoor Arena, Abbotstown, Dublin in February 2023.

== Personal life ==
Ndudi was born in Dublin, Ireland to a Nigerian father and a Dutch-Irish mother. She grew up in Dundrum, Dublin until the age of 11, when she moved to Nantes, France. Ndudi has been attending the University of Illinois, USA on a scholarship, since autumn 2023.
