= Marli Jessop =

British hurdler (born 2003)

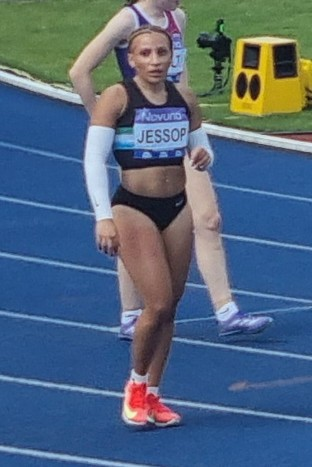
- 2025 UK Athletics Championships

Personal information
- Nationality: British
- Born: 27 June 2003 (age 23)

Sport
- Sport: Athletics
- Event: Hurdles

Achievements and titles
- Personal best(s): 60m hurdles: 8.25 (Sheffield, 2024); 100m hurdles: 13.22 (Manchester, 2024)

Marli Jessop (born 27 June 2003) is a British track and field athlete who competes in sprint hurdles. She is a medalist at the British Athletics Championships over 100 metres hurdles, and the British Indoor Athletics Championships over 60 metres hurdles.

== Early life ==
Jessop was initially keen on gymnastics before transitioning into athletics after her older sister Remi started competing. They attended St Joan of Arc Catholic School, Rickmansworth.

== Career ==
In 2022, Jessop became South of England champion for the 60m hurdles and was runner-up in the U20 nationals championship. She also became the British University champion for 60m hurdles with a winning time of 8.28 seconds whilst still 18 years-old. She was selected to compete in the British team for the 2022 World Athletics U20 Championships in Cali, Colombia in the 100 metres hurdles. Jessop finished third at the British Athletics Championships over 100 metres hurdles in July 2023.

On 17 February 2024, she qualified for the final of the 60m hurdles at the 2024 British Indoor Athletics Championships in Birmingham. In the final she finished in fourth place overall in a time of 8.30 seconds. On 23 February, she was runner-up to Abi Pawlett in the British Universities and Colleges Sport (BUCS) 60m hurdles in Sheffield with a personal best of 8.25 seconds.

She finished second in the 100m hurdles at the Loughborough International in May 2024. That month she lowered her personal best to 13.30 for the 100m hurdles in Chelmsford. She ran a personal best of 13.22 seconds to qualify for the final of the 100m hurdles at the 2024 British Athletics Championships in Manchester on 29 June 2024.

She finished third in the 60 metres hurdles at the 2025 British Indoor Athletics Championships in Birmingham. She was named in the British team for the 2025 Summer World University Games in Germany. On 2 August, she placed fourth in the final of the 100 metres hurdles at the 2025 UK Athletics Championships in Birmingham in 13:57 seconds.

Jessop was a finalist in the 60 metres hurdles at the 2026 British Indoor Athletics Championships in Birmingham, on 14 February 2026, placing fourth overall.

== Personal life ==
Jessop studied Fine Art at Buckinghamshire New University. In May 2022 her art work was exhibited in London at the Zari Gallery, as part of an The Art of the Athlete exhibition.
