= South Asian U20 Athletics Championships =

Reoccurring athletics competition

The South Asian U20 Athletics Championships is a recurring athletics competition between under-20 athletes from South Asian nations, governed by the South Asian Athletics Federation. The event, first held in 2007, was formerly known as the South Asian Junior Athletics Championships.

The competition serves as a regional complement to the biennial, continental Asian Junior Athletics Championships.

At the 2018 edition, seven countries participated, including Sri Lanka, India, and Bangladesh.

Seven countries competed in the 2024 edition.

== Editions ==
Edition	Year	Venue	City	Country	Dates	Ref
1st	2007	Sugathadasa Stadium	Colombo	Sri Lanka	29–30 November	
2nd	2013	Birsa Munda Sports Complex	Ranchi	India	10–12 November	
3rd	2018	Sugathadasa Stadium	Colombo	Sri Lanka	5–6 May	
4th	2024	Jawaharlal Nehru Stadium	Chennai	India	11–13 September	
