= Delta Amidzovski =

Australian athlete (born 2006)

Personal information
- Born: 23 August 2006 (age 20)

Sport
- Sport: Athletics
- Event: multi-event

Achievements and titles
- Personal bests: 60m: 7.69 (2021); 100m 11.97 (2023); 200m: 24.11 (2023); 100m hurdles: 13.09 (2025); High Jump: 1.78 (2020); Long Jump 6.84m (2026)
Medal record
Women's athletics
Representing Australia
Oceania Championships
Silver medal – second place	2026 Darwin	Long jump
World U20 Championships
Gold medal – first place	2024 Lima	Long jump
Bronze medal – third place	2024 Lima	100 m hurdles
Commonwealth Youth Games
Gold medal – first place	2023 Trinbago	100 m hurdles
Gold medal – first place	2023 Trinbago	Long jump

Delta Amidzovski (born 23 August 2006) is an Australian track and field athlete who competes as a multi-event athlete. She won the medal gold in the long jump at the 2024 World Athletics U20 Championships, where she was also a bronze medalist in the 100 metres hurdles. She represented Australia in the long jump at the 2025 World Athletics Championships.

== Early life ==
From New South Wales, Amidzovski is a member of Wollongong Athletics club.

== Career ==
Amidzovski was selected to compete for Australia in the 100m hurdles at the 2022 World Athletics U20 Championships, held in Cali, Colombia in August 2022. At the age of 15 years-old, she was the youngest member of the team. On 16 April 2023 Amidzovski broke the Australian national under-18 100m hurdles record which had been held by Sally Pearson, running 13.03 seconds at the national junior athletics championships. Earlier that weekend Amidzovski also won gold in the under-18 women's long jump. In August 2023, Amidzovski won the 100m hurdles at the 2023 Commonwealth Youth Games.

=== 2024: World U20 Champion ===
In April 2024, she set a new senior 100m hurdles personal best, and championship record time, of 13.31 seconds to win the Australian U20 national title in Adelaide at the Australian Athletics Championships. That year, she competed in the Australian team at the 2024 World Athletics U20 Championships in Lima, where she won gold in the long jump on 28 August 2024, with a personal best jump of 6.58 metres in the final round of the competition. She also competed in the 100m hurdles at the Championships, winning the bronze medal behind Kerrica Hill of Jamaica and Croatian Mia Wild.

=== 2025: Senior Australian debut ===
She won both the long jump (6.25m, +0.6) and 60m hurdles (8.12, +0.7) at the Australian short track national championships in Sydney on 1 February 2025. She finished third in the 100m hurdles at the Australian Athletics Championships in Perth on 13 April 2025. At the same championships, she was runner-up in the long jump with 6.38 metres. She was selected for the 2025 Summer World University Games in Germany, qualifying for the final and finishing fourth overall. In September, she competed in the long jump at the 2025 World Championships in Tokyo, Japan, jumping 6.28 metres without advancing to the final.

=== 2026 ===
Amidzovski set a new personal best of 8.06 seconds to place second in the 60 metres hurdles before winning the long jump with 6.41m (+0.2) at the Australian Short Track Championships in February 2026. Later that month, she jumped a new personal best 6.62 metres to win the Hobart Track Classic. The following month, Amidzovski jumped 6.60 metres and ran 13.32 seconds to win the long jump and 100 m hurdles titles at the NSW State Championships. On 10 April in the preliminaries at the Australian Championships, she jumped 6.84m (+0.3) to move to fifth on the Australian all-time list. She then placed second in the final on 12 April behind Brooke Buschkuehl with a jump of 6.65 metres (-0.1). In May, she won the silver medal in the long jump at the 2026 Oceania Athletics Championships. She placed fourth representing Australia in the long jump at the 2026 Commonwealth Games in Glasgow, Scotland.
