= Alejandro de la Cruz =

Cuban artistic gymnast (born 1998)

- Born: 23 August 1998 (age 28)

Gymnastics career
- Discipline: Men's artistic gymnastics
- Country represented: Cuba
Medal record
Representing Cuba
Pan American Games
Bronze medal – third place	2019 Lima	Vault
Pan American Championships
Bronze medal – third place	2023 Medellín	Rings
Central American and Caribbean Games
Silver medal – second place	2023 San Salvador	Team
Silver medal – second place	2023 San Salvador	Rings

Alejandro de la Cruz (born 23 August 1998) is a Cuban artistic gymnast.

In 2019, he represented Cuba at the Pan American Games held in Lima, Peru, and he won the bronze medal in the men's vault event.
