= 2022 Summer Gymnasiade =

Multi-sport event in Normandy, France

- Host city: Normandy
- Opening: 14 May
- Closing: 22 May

2022 Summer Gymnasiade was the 19th edition of the Gymnasiade. It was held from 14–22 May 2022 in Normandy, France.

== Sports ==
- Athletics ()
- Gymnastics ()
  - Artistic gymnastics
  - Rhythmic gymnastics
- Swimming ()
- Archery ()
- Fencing ()
- Judo ()
- Karate ()
- Taekwondo ()
- Wrestling ()
- Chess ()
- Tennis ()
- Golf ()
- Pétanque ()
- Boxing ()
- Table tennis ()
- Surfing ()
- Cycling ()

== Participating nations ==
Athletes from Belarus and Russia are banned from participating in the games due to the Russian invasion of Ukraine.

== Medal table ==
The medal table is based on the official website of the 2022 Summer Gymnasiade organizing committee

Rank	Nation	Gold	Silver	Bronze	Total
1	France*	51	37	42	130
2	Brazil	45	45	36	126
3	Kazakhstan	33	32	21	86
4	Turkey	25	25	42	92
5	Hungary	22	14	18	54
6	Chinese Taipei	21	20	27	68
7	Spain	14	9	15	38
8	Ukraine	11	18	19	48
9	Algeria	10	8	8	26
10	Romania	9	7	22	38
11	China	7	4	5	16
12	Armenia	4	3	3	10
13	Greece	3	18	12	33
14	Cyprus	3	6	3	12
15	India	3	5	10	18
16	Morocco	3	2	8	13
17	Uganda	2	1	4	7
18	United States	1	1	10	12
19	England	1	1	5	7
20	Estonia	1	1	1	3
21	Israel	1	1	0	2
22	Croatia	1	0	0	1
22	Nigeria	1	0	0	1
24	Finland	0	4	4	8
25	Argentina	0	2	0	2
26	Latvia	0	1	2	3
27	Luxembourg	0	1	1	2
27	Mexico	0	1	1	2
29	Mauritius	0	1	0	1
29	Senegal	0	1	0	1
31	United Arab Emirates	0	0	3	3
32	Bangladesh	0	0	1	1
32	Mongolia	0	0	1	1
32	Serbia	0	0	1	1
Totals (34 entries)		272	269	325	866
