= Mia McIntosh =

British athlete

Personal information
- Nationality: British
- Born: 11 January 2005 (age 21)

Sport
- Sport: Athletics
- Event: 100m hurdles

Achievements and titles
- Personal best(s): 100m hurdles: 13.28 (Birmingham, 2024)
Medal record
Women's athletics
Representing Great Britain
European U18 Championships
Gold medal – first place	2022 Jerusalem	100m hurdles

Mia McIntosh (born 11 January 2005) is a British track and field athlete who competes in sprints and hurdles. She won the 100 meters hurdles during the 2022 European Athletics U18 Championships.

== Early life ==
From Harpenden, McIntosh attended Roundwood Park School. She then attended Oaklands College in Hertfordshire.

== Career ==
McIntosh became the British hurdles record-holder at under-15 level in 2019, and at under-17 level in 2021.

She became the British record holder at under-18 level for the 100m hurdles in July 2022, running 13.45 in Geneva. She won gold in the 100m hurdles at the 2022 European Athletics U18 Championships in Jerusalem. McIntosh competed at the 2022 World Athletics U20 Championships in Cali, Colombia but had to withdraw with injury. She ended 2022 ranked second in the world over the U18 height hurdles.

She was selected for the Great Britain and Northern Ireland team to compete at the 2023 European Athletics U20 Championships in Jerusalem, Israel in August 2023.

She set a personal best of 13.35 seconds to qualify for the final of the 100m hurdles at the 2024 British Athletics Championships in Manchester on 29 June 2024. She placed fifth in the final. She competed at the 2024 World Athletics U20 Championships in Lima, Peru, reaching the semi-final of the 100 metres hurdles. In November 2024, she was named by British Athletics on the Olympic Futures Programme for 2025.
