= Yuri Guimarães =

Brazilian artistic gymnast (born 2003)

- Full name: Yuri Monteverde Guimarães
- Born: 25 July 2003 (age 23) São Paulo, Brazil

Gymnastics career
- Discipline: Men's artistic gymnastics
- Country represented: Brazil; (2022–present)
- Club: AGITH
- Head coach: Marcos Gotto
Medal record
Artistic gymnastics
Representing Brazil
Pan American Games
Bronze medal – third place	2023 Santiago	Team
Pan American Championships
Gold medal – first place	2023 Medellín	Vault
Silver medal – second place	2023 Medellín	Floor
Bronze medal – third place	2023 Medellín	All-around
Bronze medal – third place	2023 Medellín	Team
South American Games
Gold medal – first place	2022 Asunción	Team
Gold medal – first place	2026 Santa Fe	Team
Gold medal – first place	2026 Santa Fe	Vault
South American Championships
Gold medal – first place	2021 San Juan	Team
Gold medal – first place	2022 Lima	Team
Gold medal – first place	2022 Lima	Floor
Gold medal – first place	2022 Lima	Vault
Silver medal – second place	2022 Lima	All-around
Junior Pan American Games
Silver medal – second place	2021 Cali	Team
Silver medal – second place	2021 Cali	Parallel bars

Yuri Monteverde Guimarães (born 25 July 2003) is a Brazilian artistic gymnast and a member of the Brazilian national gymnastics team.

== Competitive history ==
Year	Event	Team	AA	FX	PH	SR	VT	PB	HB
Junior
2019	Junior South American Championships	1st place, gold medalist(s)	5				8	6	6
2019	Brazilian Championships	3rd place, bronze medalist(s)	3rd place, bronze medalist(s)	2nd place, silver medalist(s)	3rd place, bronze medalist(s)		2nd place, silver medalist(s)	5	5
2021
2021	Junior Pan American Championships	3rd place, bronze medalist(s)	7	1st place, gold medalist(s)		7	2nd place, silver medalist(s)	8	4
2021	Brazilian Championships (senior)	3rd place, bronze medalist(s)	7				2nd place, silver medalist(s)	7	
2021	Junior Pan American Games	2nd place, silver medalist(s)	5					2nd place, silver medalist(s)	5
Senior
2022	Brazil Trophy			8	6	8	2nd place, silver medalist(s)	7	6
2022	Brazilian Championships	3rd place, bronze medalist(s)	3rd place, bronze medalist(s)	1st place, gold medalist(s)	12	7	1st place, gold medalist(s)	6	8
2022	South American Championships	1st place, gold medalist(s)	2nd place, silver medalist(s)	1st place, gold medalist(s)			1st place, gold medalist(s)		5
2022	South American Games	1st place, gold medalist(s)		5			5		
2022	World Championships	7					R2		
2023	DTB Pokal Team Challenge	9		6			2nd place, silver medalist(s)		
2023	DTB Pokal Mixed Cup	3rd place, bronze medalist(s)							
2023	Brazil Trophy			6			1st place, gold medalist(s)		3rd place, bronze medalist(s)
2023	Pan American Championships	3rd place, bronze medalist(s)	3rd place, bronze medalist(s)	2nd place, silver medalist(s)	5	13	1st place, gold medalist(s)	8	10
2023	Osijek World Challenge Cup			7			4		
2023	Brazilian Championships	1st place, gold medalist(s)	1st place, gold medalist(s)	12	5	7	1st place, gold medalist(s)	3rd place, bronze medalist(s)	3rd place, bronze medalist(s)
2023	World Championships	13							
2023	Pan American Games	2nd place, silver medalist(s)		8			4		
2024	Cairo World Cup			R1					
2024	Baku World Cup			6					
2024	Doha World Cup			5			R3		
2024	Brazil Trophy			4		1st place, gold medalist(s)	1st place, gold medalist(s)	3rd place, bronze medalist(s)	8
2024	Brazilian Championships	3rd place, bronze medalist(s)		1st place, gold medalist(s)	3rd place, bronze medalist(s)		3rd place, bronze medalist(s)		
2025	Szombathely World Challenge Cup						7		
2026	South American Games	1st place, gold medalist(s)					1st place, gold medalist(s)		
